= Professional wrestling match types =

Various types of matches used in professional wrestling

Many types of wrestling matches, sometimes called "gimmick matches" in the jargon of the business, are performed in professional wrestling. Some gimmick matches are more common than others and are often used to advance or conclude a storyline. Throughout professional wrestling's decades-long history, some gimmick matches have spawned many variations of the core concept.

== Singles match ==
The singles match is the most common of all professional wrestling matches, which involves only two competitors competing for one fall. A victory is obtained by pinfall, submission, knockout, countout, or disqualification. One of the most common variations on the singles match is to restrict the possible means for victory.

=== Blindfold match ===
In a blindfold match, the two participants must wear a blindfold over their eyes for the entire duration of the match. A well-known example of this match is the WrestleMania VII match between Jake "The Snake" Roberts and Rick Martel. It is also known as a Prince of Darkness match.

=== Pure wrestling rules match ===
A type of match contested in Ring of Honor (ROH) and All Elite Wrestling (AEW), usually for the ROH Pure Championship. It is contested under stricter rules; each wrestler is only allowed up to three rope breaks, and submission and pin attempts on or under the ropes by their opponent are considered legal if all three breaks are exhausted. Closed fists are illegal, and the first offense (if seen by the official) results in a warning. A second offense results in disqualification. If a match does not conclude within a time limit, the winner is determined by a panel of judges.

=== Bloodsport/Underground match ===
Matches in a style that mimics the early days of MMA and catch-as-catch-can wrestling. It is common for Bloodsport competitors to have some knowledge in other combat sports and/or MMA, as well as professional wrestling, as these one-on-one matches often appear stiff and have a feel of worked shoot-style fights. These matches have a unique ruleset compared to a traditional wrestling event; the wrestling ring is replaced by a ring canvas with no ropes or turnbuckles, and every match must end in either a knockout, submission, or referee stoppage.

The format was used by Game Changer Wrestling's semi-annual Bloodsport event beginning in 2018. In August 2020 amid the COVID-19 pandemic, WWE's Monday Night Raw briefly adopted its own version of the concept known as Raw Underground, airing as a segment in the third hour of the show. Hosted and refereed by Shane McMahon, the segment took place in the basement of the WWE Performance Center during eight episodes of Raw from August 3 to September 21, 2020.

WWE's NXT brand adopted the concept on the July 4, 2023 episode of WWE NXT, hosting an Underground match between Eddy Thorpe and Damon Kemp. Unlike the Raw matches, these took place in the show's main studio, with the ring ropes being taken down and a black canvas covering the ring. On the December 26, 2023 episode of NXT, Thorpe defeated Dijak in the second NXT Underground match. The first women's Underground match took place on week 2 of NXT Spring Breakin' (2024), where Lola Vice (who previously competed in Bellator MMA under her real name of Valerie Loureda before joining WWE) defeated Natalya. Underground matches would become Lola Vice's signature match, later defeating Shayna Baszler, Jaida Parker and Kelani Jordan. Her winning streak ended on the August 4, 2026 episode of NXT, where she was unable to regain the NXT Women's Championship against Kendal Grey as she lost by submission due to a modified leg-trap armbar.

=== Shoot-style wrestling rules ===
The inspiration behind Bloodsport, Underground, and Pure rules, derived from multiple companies that cropped up during the Japanese shoot-style boom of the 1980s & '90s. While they still all emphasized victories via knockout, submission or stoppage, and typically did not count pinfalls, the exact rules varied from promotion to promotion. Also, the traditional wrestling ring, ropes & turnbuckles were retained, as they played into a common "points" system.

==== Newborn UWF ====
The revived UWF of 1988 originated the a proto- point system that multiple subsequent companies followed. In order to reward overall dominance during a match, they dictated that a wrestler could also win a match via 5 "knock downs" (wherein the opponent did not return to their feet immediately). Furthermore, three rope breaks to escape submissions counted as one knock down.

==== UWF International ====
UWF's successor, the UWFi, kept the rule, but reformatted them as 15 explicit "points" that either wrestler would start out with, and lose after knock downs (3 points) or rope breaks (1 point). The wrestler won the match when his opponent has zero points. They also added successfully performing an overhead bridging suplex on one's opponent as reducing that opponent's points by 1. UWFi also promoted tag team & 6-man tag team matches, wherein the points would be increased to 21 and 30 for either side, respectively.

==== Fighting Network Rings ====
Matches in RINGS adhered to a 30-minute time limit and were winnable via a 10-count knockout, submission, TKO (as ordained by either the referee or ringside doctor), or judges should the time limit be reached. Competitors were both allotted 10 points, and would lose one should they grab the ropes to force a submission break, or two should they be knocked down. Should the time limit be reached, the winner would be he who lost fewer points. Should points be equal, judges would decide.

==== Pancrase ====
Pancrase equated one rope break to one knock down, and began its existence with a 5-point limit on competitors. As time went on they changed the specifics multiple times. In 1996 they lowered non-championship matches to 3 points, whereas in 1998 they delineated points by the match's time limit (3 for 20 minutes, 2 for 15 minutes, 1 for 10 minutes).

== Battle royale-based variations ==
The battle royale is a multi-competitor match type in which wrestlers are eliminated until only one is left. Typical battle royales begin with 20 or more participants all in the ring at the same time, who are then eliminated by being thrown over the top rope and having both feet touch the venue floor.

=== Battlebowl ===
The Battlebowl is a two-ring variation on a battle royale. In these matches, the wrestlers start in one ring and try to throw wrestlers into the second ring, after which they can be eliminated by being thrown out of that ring. The last remaining wrestler in the first ring can rest until only one wrestler is left in the second ring, after which they fight in both rings until one is eliminated and a winner is declared, in similar fashion to a double elimination tournament. This was held by World Championship Wrestling at the 1991 Starrcade event, but future Battlebowl matches were contested under normal battle royale rules.

=== Battle Zone ===
The battle zone features any number of men in a one-ring, over-the-top-rope elimination. A typical battle royale, except this one features tables covered with barbed wire, thumbtacks, and light bulbs on the outside of the ring, which may catch wrestlers as they are thrown out of the ring.

=== Bunkhouse Stampede ===
The National Wrestling Alliance's (NWA) Bunkhouse Stampede involved wrestlers wearing what was described as "bunkhouse gear"—cowboy boots, jeans, T-shirts—instead of their normal wrestling tights and not only allowed but encouraged the bringing of weapons. In 1988 the NWA named a pay-per-view after the Bunkhouse Stampede, headlined by a Bunkhouse Stampede match held inside a cage. Recently, the match has been revitalized by Ricky Morton of the Rock n' Roll Express at his wrestling academy in Chuckey, Tennessee.

=== Last Blood battle royale ===
A last blood battle royale is essentially a multi-competitor First Blood match. All competitors start at the same time and wrestlers are eliminated when they start bleeding. The winner is the last wrestler in the match not bleeding. This match was held in the Tri-State Wrestling Association, a predecessor to Extreme Championship Wrestling.

=== Reverse battle royale ===
Generally used in TNA/Impact Wrestling, a reverse battle royale begins with wrestlers surrounding the ring instead of inside it. At the start of the match they battle for half of them to get into the ring, at which point a standard last person standing wins the battle royale.

The Cage Reverse Battle Royale is another TNA variation of this match type. This actually has three stages; It begins the first stage as an inside-out battle royale with 15 or more wrestlers involved. The first seven to enter the ring over the top cage will advance to the second stage which is a gauntlet match. When it gets down to the final stage, only two wrestlers will battle in a singles match which is decided by pinfall or submission.

=== Semi-final battle royale ===
A semi-final battle royale consists of a battle royale where when a specific number of wrestlers are remaining, the match ends, and those that remain are placed in a standard wrestling match for the prize at stake. An example of this occurred on a January 2024 episode of NXT, where 20 women competed in a battle royal that became a Fatal 4-Way once there were four competitors remaining.

In All Elite Wrestling (AEW), it is known as a Dynamite Dozen Battle Royale, as twelve competitors compete until it is reduced to two, and there is a subsequent episode where the final two compete, in this case, "AEW Dynamite Diamond Ring".

In New Japan Pro-Wrestling (NJPW), the 2021 New Japan Rumble at Wrestle Kingdom 15 was conducted as a semi-final battle royale. Chase Owens, Bad Luck Fale, Tetsuya Bushi, and Toru Yano were the final four that competed in a championship match the next day.

=== World War 3 ===
Created by WCW in 1995, the World War 3 battle royale involved a three-ring setup and 60 competitors; 20 wrestlers started in each of the three rings, in which they would wrestle under regular battle royale rules. Once there were 30 competitors remaining (except in 1997, where the number was 20), all competitors would enter the center ring and continue under regular rules until only one wrestler was left standing.

== Cinematic match ==
A cinematic match is not technically a match type itself, but rather, it is a term used to refer to matches that are produced with various cinematic techniques. The rules vary from match to match, but generally have a basis in hardcore wrestling. Unlike a normal wrestling match, which is done in one take and typically in front of a live audience, cinematic matches are shot over several hours with various scenes filmed, similar to filmmaking, with higher-budget production involved. The final product (the complete match) generally lasts from 20 to 40 minutes and airs at a later time, typically for a pay-per-view event. They are also usually filmed on-location or at a custom built set.

On October 4, 1987, Antonio Inoki defeated Masa Saito in a Ganryū-jima Island Death Match in a shoreside ring with no referee which lasted for two hours. Inoki billed the match to pay homage to the island's famous duel between Miyamoto Musashi and Sasaki Kojirō. The match was captured by a multi camera setup by a ground crew and from the air via helicopter. The action mostly took place in the ring and only occasionally spilling out to the area around it. As the match drew on into the evening, torches were placed in order to illuminate the surrounding area. Inoki would defeat Saito with a sleeper hold. Despite the match title having "deathmatch" in the name, it was more of a submission based match. This match is considered to be the first ever cinematic match.

While not considered a cinematic match at the time, the Hollywood Backlot Brawl between Roddy Piper and Goldust at WrestleMania XII in 1996 is considered an early cinematic match by the World Wrestling Federation (now WWE), as it used techniques now featured in cinematic matches. Unlike future cinematic matches (which typically air during one segment), the match aired during several segments in between matches inside the ring, and featured both pre-taped segments outside the Arrowhead Pond of the two fighting as well as Piper "chasing" Goldust's solid gold Cadillac in a white Ford Bronco in an obvious reference to the then-ongoing O. J. Simpson murder case. (Vince McMahon mentioned on commentary without completely breaking kayfabe that the "footage looked awfully familiar"; in reality, repurposed footage of Simpson's infamous Bronco chase was actually used as part of the match.) The match eventually ended in the ring live, when Piper stripped Goldust down to women's lingerie and kissed him as part of "making him a man". WrestleMania XII featured a second cinematic match between "The Huckster" and "Nacho Man".

At SummerSlam 1996, The Undertaker faced Mankind in a "Boiler Room Brawl" that was largely pre-taped, incorporating props and unorthodox camera angles.

In the 2010s, the Lucha Underground television show was co-developed by action and horror filmmaker Robert Rodriguez, with significant use of cinematic presentation.

In 2016, Total Nonstop Action Wrestling (TNA) held a match entitled the "Final Deletion" between brothers Matt Hardy and Jeff Hardy for the July 5 episode of Impact Wrestling, which was filmed at Matt Hardy's compound. It was a hardcore wrestling match with falls count anywhere. The sequel was a brawl between The Broken Hardys and Decay titled "Delete or Decay". The Broken Hardys and Decay continued their feud at Bound for Glory, where Decay lost their TNA World Tag Team Championship to The Hardys in "The Great War". The Hardys issued an open tag team invitational at their compound on the December 15 episode of Impact Wrestling, titled Total Nonstop Deletion. The main event was the "Tag Team Apocalypto" where The Hardys last defeated Decay.

Although not contested as a match, WWE followed this up shortly after and filmed a cinematic-style brawl between The New Day (Big E, Kofi Kingston, and Xavier Woods) and The Wyatt Family (Bray Wyatt, Erick Rowan, and Braun Strowman) that was held at The Wyatt Family Compound and shown on the July 11, 2016 episode of WWE Raw. WWE then taped their own cinematic match for their 2017 pay-per-view Payback, called a House of Horrors match between Randy Orton and Bray Wyatt. Similar to the "Final Deletion" match in TNA, this one was held at an abandoned house, but instead of falls count anywhere, this match had to end in the ring in the arena that the event was held in (the House of Horrors scenes were pre-taped, while the in-ring portion was live). The next cinematic match would occur on the March 19, 2018 episode of Raw, which featured Matt Hardy, who had returned to WWE and became "Woken" Matt Hardy, against Bray Wyatt and was called the "Ultimate Deletion;" this was just like the "Final Deletion," including being held at Matt's compound.

Cinematic matches became more frequent in 2020 as a result of the COVID-19 pandemic; the pandemic began affecting the professional wrestling industry in March that year, forcing promotions to hold events behind closed doors. WWE would hold several cinematic matches at their pay-per-views between March and August, being highly praised for the two that occurred at WrestleMania 36; a Boneyard match between The Undertaker and AJ Styles, which was a Buried Alive match held at a custom built cemetery set in the Orlando area, and a Firefly Fun House match between John Cena and "The Fiend" Bray Wyatt. (Although the match ended with The Fiend pinning Cena in a ring, the match itself was a dream-like sequence of Cena's career, showing his perceived character flaws; the various segments were filmed at WWE's Titan Towers headquarters in Stamford, Connecticut). Following this, cinematic matches occurred at Money in the Bank in May, which was the event's eponymous ladder matches that occurred at WWE's headquarters, a Backlot Brawl between Adam Cole and Velveteen Dream in the parking lot of Full Sail University at NXT TakeOver: In Your House in June, a cinematically produced singles match between Edge and Randy Orton at Backlash (billed as "The Greatest Wrestling Match Ever") also in June, and a Wyatt Swamp Fight between Bray Wyatt and Braun Strowman at The Horror Show at Extreme Rules in July. Following the introduction of the WWE ThunderDome and Capitol Wrestling Center (CWC) staging arenas in August and October, respectively, the use of cinematic matches was greatly reduced, as these new staging arenas allowed fans to attend the events virtually. To go with the Halloween-theme at NXT: Halloween Havoc in October, a Haunted House of Terrors match was held between Dexter Lumis and Cameron Grimes, which was similar to the House of Horrors match from Payback 2017. Matches involving Randy Orton, "The Fiend" Bray Wyatt, and Alexa Bliss have also used cinematic techniques, such as the Firefly Inferno match between Orton and The Fiend at TLC: Tables, Ladders & Chairs in December, where Orton set The Fiend's entire body on fire, and an intergender match between Orton and Bliss at Fastlane in March 2021, where Bliss used supernatural powers. Since the resumption of live touring in July 2021, WWE ceased producing cinematic matches.

AEW also incorporated cinematic matches during pandemic restrictions in 2020 and 2021, most notably the Stadium Stampede match at Double or Nothing 2020, which was a 5v5 empty arena match in the TIAA Bank Field stadium. During that period, AEW featured at least one cinematic match at each of their PPVs: a "Tooth and Nail match" at All Out 2020 between Dr. Britt Baker, D.M.D. and Big Swole at Baker's real-life dental office, a match entitled "The Elite Deletion" at Full Gear 2020, featuring Matt Hardy against Sammy Guevara and similar to the other "Deletion" matches involving Hardy, and a tag team street fight pitting Darby Allin and Sting against Team Taz (Brian Cage and Ricky Starks) at Revolution 2021, which was held at an abandoned warehouse somewhere in Atlanta, Georgia. At Double or Nothing 2021 the Stadium Stampede match was a hybrid cinematic match with the first half recorded at TIAA Bank Field, then concluding live at the adjacent Daily's Place. The audience in attendance watched the first half of the match on video screens before the action spilled into the amphitheater. This would be AEW's final cinematic match produced before the company resumed live touring in July that year.

Impact Wrestling would also return to producing cinematic matches in 2021 when Ethan Page wrestled his alter ego "The Karate Man" at Hard to Kill in a Mortal Kombat-style cinematic match that saw The Karate Man "kill" Page in what would be Page's last appearance with Impact before leaving for AEW.

== Container-based variations ==
Some matches have a container stationed in or near the ring, with the object of the match being to trap the opposing wrestler in it. All of these matches are fought under hardcore rules, and many of these matches take the name of the container, such as Ambulance match and the Casket match. A similar type of match aims to restrain opposing wrestlers somehow, and the match often takes the name of the restraining device – for example, the Stretcher. None of these matches can end in a pinfall, submission, countout, or disqualification.

Common containers used for these matches are caskets (connected to The Undertaker's Deadman persona, either using a typical coffin or a double-deep, double-wide casket, sometimes specially designed for specific opponents The Undertaker takes on), ambulances, dumpsters, hearses (known as a "Last Ride match", also connected to The Undertaker gimmick), and stretchers.

=== Ambulance match ===
An Ambulance match is fought under hardcore rules, no pinfalls, no submissions, no disqualifications, no countouts and the only way to win is for one wrestler to force their opponent into the back of an ambulance and close the door. The first ambulance match in WWE took place at Survivor Series 2003 where Kane defeated Shane McMahon. The second Ambulance match in WWE one took place at Elimination Chamber (2012) which also involved Kane as one of the competitors. His opponent was John Cena, who won the match, where an additional rule was added in that the ambulance has to leave to win. The third Ambulance match in WWE was part of Three Stages of Hell match at WWE Payback on June 16, 2013, in Rosemont, Illinois between John Cena and Ryback for the WWE Championship. The most recent known ambulance match was on the January 2, 2026 edition of WWE Friday Night Smackdown from Buffalo, New York, between Damian Priest and Aleister Black, which also involved minor appearances from Zelina Vega and Rhea Ripley. The famous 2017 Lucha Underground "Hell of War" bout between Dante Fox (A.R. Fox) and Killshot (Swerve Strickland) was that promotion's only ambulance match. Stretcher matches in All Elite Wrestling also involve ambulance match rules, where the objective is to place the opponent onto a stretcher, roll the stretcher into the back of an ambulance, and close both doors to gain the victory.

=== Buried alive match ===
A buried alive match is one in which the object is for one wrestler to throw his opponent into a grave dug out of a large mound of soil placed outside the ring. Once in the grave, the wrestler must bury his opponent in dirt and soil to the referee's discretion. Equipment ranging from shovels and wheelbarrows to bulldozers are often made available to completely bury the opponent. The Buried Alive match is one of three of The Undertaker's signature matches (the Casket and Last Ride matches being the others).

A cinematic Buried Alive match was held between The Undertaker and AJ Styles for WrestleMania 36, referred to as a "Boneyard match" . The match took place outdoors in a cemetery-like setting near an abandoned warehouse rather than in a traditional ring.

=== Casket match ===
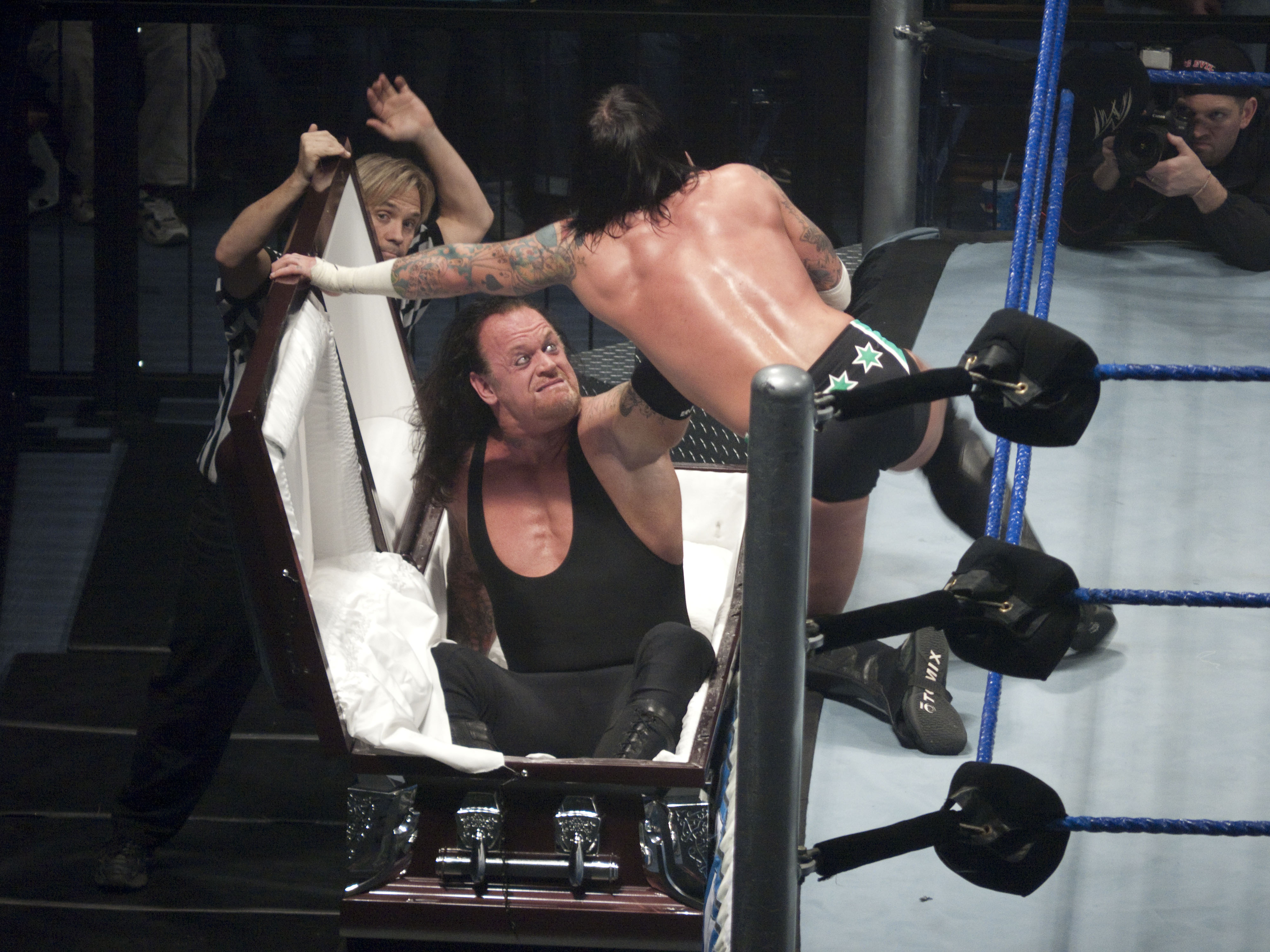
The Undertaker in a casket match against CM Punk

The casket match (also known as the Coffin match) has a casket near the ring, with the objective of the match being to trap the opposing wrestler inside. The casket match began its life as a one-off coffin match in the 1970s fought between Dusty Rhodes and Ivan Koloff. The coffin match was revived as one of The Undertaker's signature matches and first appeared on television at the Survivor Series as the coffin match against Kamala. Prior to that, at a house show on July 14, 1991, the Ultimate Warrior defeated the Undertaker in a casket match in St. Louis, Missouri at Busch Stadium. There have been 17 casket matches, 11 of which have been won by The Undertaker. The 20th edition was held at Halloween Havoc and the first following the retirement of The Undertaker involving Grayson Waller vs. Apollo Crews in which Crews won. WWE held its first women's casket match on the October 29, 2024 episode of NXT involving Tatum Paxley and Wendy Choo in which Paxley won.

In addition to WWE, the casket match has been adopted for use in Total Nonstop Action Wrestling, All Elite Wrestling, and Lucha Underground, with Lucha Underground denominating it as the Grave Consequences (subsequently Graver Consequences) match. The Last Rites match is a Total Nonstop Action Wrestling variation where a casket is lowered into the center of the ring, and the objective is to get your opponent into the casket, which is raised to the ceiling following the match. Another toned-down version of the Casket Match is when a victory is not obtained by placing the opponent in the coffin but by pinfall or submission. However, the defeated wrestler is then placed into the coffin. In 2023, TNA Wrestling brought back the Last Rites match, but modified it to be more similar to a regular casket match.

=== Dumpster match ===
A dumpster match is a no-disqualification, no-submission, no-countout, no-fall hardcore match in which the only objective to win is by forcing your opponent into a dumpster and closing the lid. The first match occurred was at WrestleMania XIV, pitting The New Age Outlaws against Cactus Jack and Chainsaw Charlie.

The most recent Dumpster match taking place, was on the October 4th, 2024 episode of Smackdown, in which Michin powerbombed Chelsea Green through a table and into a Dumpster.

== Enclosure-based variations ==
Some matches take place in specific enclosed environments. Although the majority of these enclosures are set up either in or around the ring, some of them are placed apart from it. In all cases, the structure itself is considered "in play" and most enclosure-based matches are decided by pinfall or submission unless specific other stipulations are made beforehand.

=== Steel cage match ===
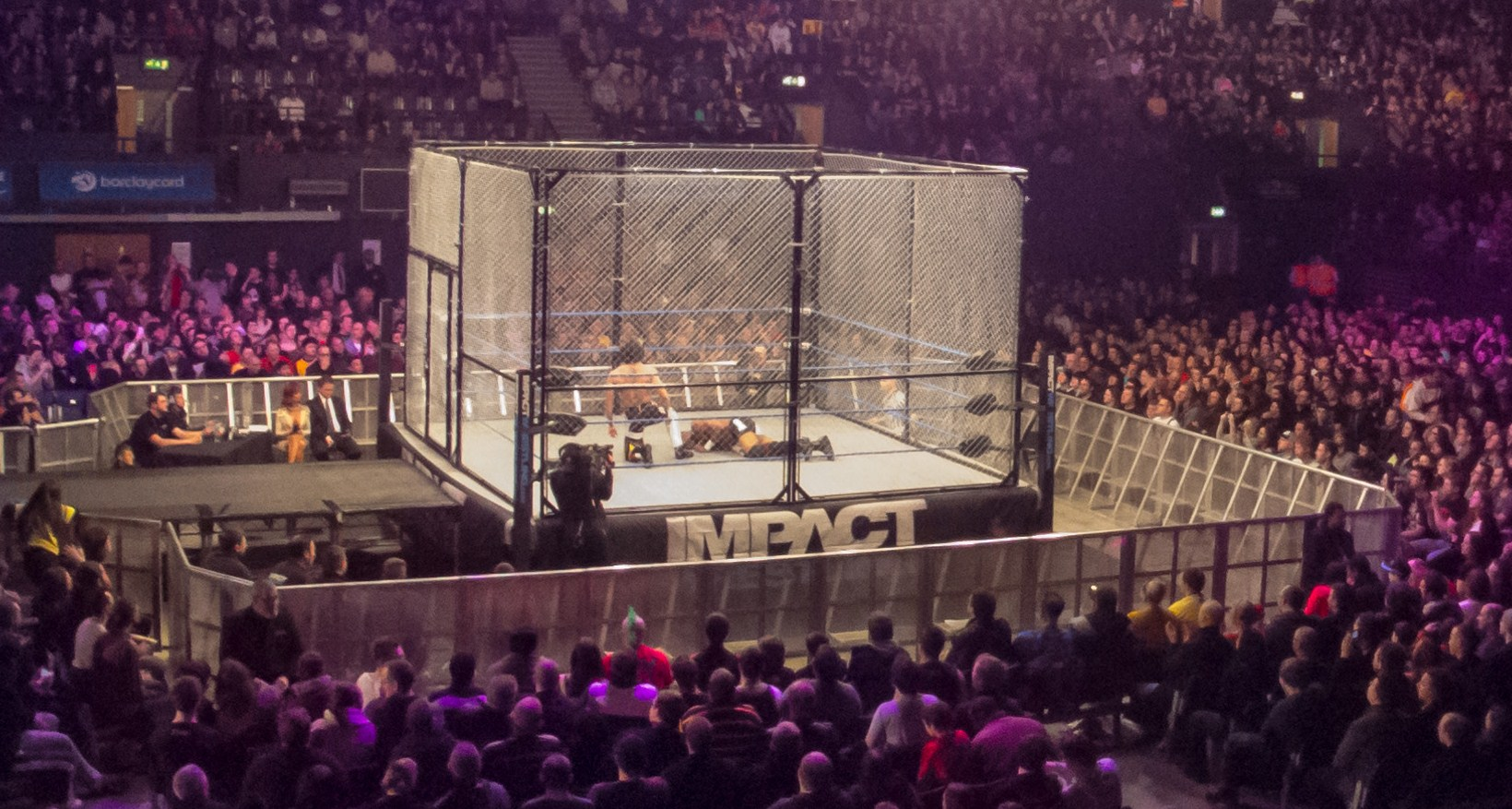
A steel cage match at a 2013 Impact Wrestling event

Steel cages are one of the oldest form of enclosures used in professional wrestling. The earliest known "steel cage matches" of any kind took place on January 9, 1936, in Caruthersville, Missouri, in a card that included two such "chicken wire fence" matches between Jez and Otto Ludwig, and Joe Dillman vs. Charles Sinkey. These matches took place in a ring surrounded by chicken wire, to keep the athletes inside, and prevent any potential interference. They have evolved a great deal over time, changing from chicken wire to steel bars to chain-link fencing (the latter is now the standard, due to it being cheaper to manufacture, lighter to transport, and more flexible and thus safer for the wrestlers).

A steel cage match is a match fought within a cage formed by placing sheets of mesh metal around, in, or against the edges of the wrestling ring. The most common way of winning is by simply escaping the cage, either over the top of the cage wall and having both feet touch the arena floor, or by escaping through the cage door with both feet touching the arena floor. The other occasional ways to win a steel cage match are by pinfall or by submission.

It is also possible to have one wrestler attempting to escape over the top of the cage wall while another tries to escape through the cage door. In Mexico, steel cage matches are won by just climbing to the top of the cage wall. In TNA, the matches were previously branded Six Sides of Steel as the cage surrounded their six-sided ring.

=== Barbed Wire Steel Cage match ===
A barbed wire steel cage match is a match that uses strands of barbed wire in a steel cage match in some capacity, usually around the top of the cage. Simply using barbed wire in an otherwise regular steel cage match does not make the match a barbed wire steel cage match; the barbed wire must be part of the cage's design. This type of match is one where escape from the cage is almost impossible, because in addition to the barbed wire preventing escape over the top of the cage, the cage's door is also locked with chains and a padlock, like a Hell in a Cell match. One particular example was John "Bradshaw" Layfield vs. Big Show at No Way Out 2005 where in addition to the barbed wire there was also razor wire wrapped around the top of the cage in a circular fashion; and another example was Adam Cole vs Johnny Gargano at NXT TakeOver: Toronto 2019 where in addition to the barbed wire and the chain-locked door, various weapons were made available at the top of the cage; this cage however did not have razor wire.

=== Bungee Match ===
A Bungee Match is a type of match in which two competitors are enclosed in a steel cage with one side open, each are wearing a secure harness attached to a bungee cord and are suspended high into the air to have a wrestling match. The winner is the wrestler who throws their opponent out of the cage forcing the opponent to swing from the cord. The match was held in Global Wrestling Federation between Chaz Taylor and Steven Dane on August 14, 1992, and ended after Dane was thrown out of the cage.

=== Cage of Death match ===
The Cage of Death match is a type of steel cage match with various weapons littered in the cage, such as electrified cage walls, cacti, tables, light tubes, glass, thumbtacks, baseball bats, barbed wire and numerous other weapons and objects. This match always features as the main event of CZW's biggest show, Cage of Death. Some of these matches have been done under WarGames style rules with two rings being used.

=== Chamber of Extreme match ===
In a Chamber of Extreme match, created by Extreme Canadian Championship Wrestling (ECCW), an 8-feet-high steel cage surrounds the ringside area with the top wrapped in barbed wire and "extreme" weapons scattered around the ring and ringside area. Disqualifications, count-outs and rope-breaks do not apply. The winner is decided by pinfall, submission or being unable to stand up at 10-count.

=== Dixieland match ===
A Dixieland match (named for TNA President Dixie Carter, who "invented" the match) is a hybrid steel cage/ladder match. The wrestlers start the match in the ring enclosed in a steel cage. To win the match, a wrestler must first climb out of the cage, then go up the entrance ramp where a championship belt is hung from the ceiling, and finally climb a ladder to retrieve the belt. The first match of this type occurred during the Impact Wrestling: Final Resolution taping on December 3, 2013, as Magnus defeated Jeff Hardy to become TNA World Heavyweight Champion.

=== Doomsday Cage match ===
Also called a Tower of Doom, the Doomsday Cage is a three-story cage – the middle one split into two rooms – all of which house wrestlers. The object of the match is for a team of wrestlers to fight their way from the top cage to the bottom, where pinfalls and submissions come into play. In the later days of WCW, it was referred to as a Triple Decker Cage match, a reference to the match type being used in the finale of the film Ready to Rumble. The most notable match of this type occurred at WCW's Uncensored event in 1996, when Hulk Hogan and Randy Savage fought Ric Flair, Arn Anderson, Meng, The Barbarian, Lex Luger, Kevin Sullivan, Z-Gangsta, and The Ultimate Solution.

=== Electrified Cage match ===
The Electrified Cage match is a variation of a steel cage match where the ring is surrounded by an electrified steel cage. The cage can be also used as a weapon. The only way to win is by pinfall or submission. The Lucha en Jaula Electrificada is another variation of the electrified cage match in which the only way to win is by escape. The cage is turned off in a time interval, allowing the participants a chance at escape before it turns back on. This match type is used by the AAA promotion in Mexico.

=== Elimination Chamber match ===
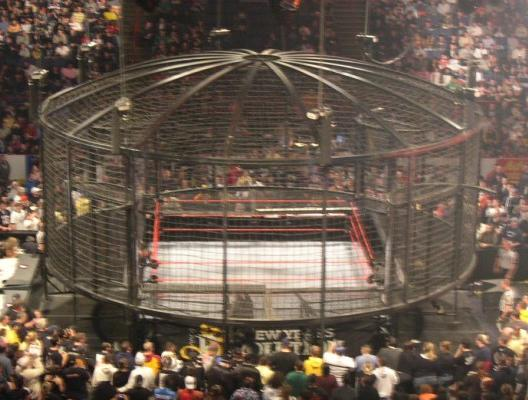
The original Elimination Chamber structure

The Elimination Chamber (known as No Escape in Germany to avoid a potential brand blunder over references of gas chambers in The Holocaust), which was the result of an idea by Triple H and introduced by Eric Bischoff for WWE in 2002, is a steel cage with a grid-locked, chain-linked enclosure with support bars that surrounds the ring entirely, including creating a steel grated (later padded) floor area on the apron. Inside the cage, at each turnbuckle, is a clear pod in which competitors in the match wait to join the match. As the name implies, this is an elimination-style match, so wrestlers are eliminated one-by-one via pinfall or submission until only one remains.

The original Chamber, used from 2002 to 2016, was cylindrical, and a re-designed chamber introduced in 2017 was cubic, but still used the same materials with the same 4 enclosures.

An Extreme Elimination Chamber took place at the 2006 December to Dismember pay-per-view, where each waiting wrestler was given a weapon. Since 2010, WWE has held an eponymous Elimination Chamber pay-per-view every February, with this match type as one of its marquee matches. At its 2018 edition, the first-ever women's Elimination Chamber match was held, as well as the first seven-man Elimination Chamber match.

=== Fight Pit match ===
The Fight Pit match is a variation of a cage match where the ring is surrounded by a steel cage rather than ropes and turnbuckles, with a catwalk surrounding the top. The catwalk also has chain-linked fence surrounding the outer edge (originally railings), which the wrestlers can climb up to and jump from. The match also has a no-pinfall stipulation, which means it can only be won by submission or knockout either by making the opponent unable to stand up at a 10-count or via technical knockout, making the match somewhat of a hybrid of a professional wrestling match and a mixed martial arts fight- MMA fights can only be won in those ways. The inaugural fight pit match was held during the May 27, 2020 episode of NXT, between Matt Riddle and Timothy Thatcher (with Kurt Angle as a guest referee). A modified version of the Pit with chain-linked fencing was used at the Extreme Rules premium live event where Matt Riddle and Seth Rollins continued their rivalry (with UFC Hall of Famer Daniel Cormier as a guest referee). The match between Riddle & Rollins was the first ever Fight Pit match in a WWE PPV.

=== Hell in a Cell match ===
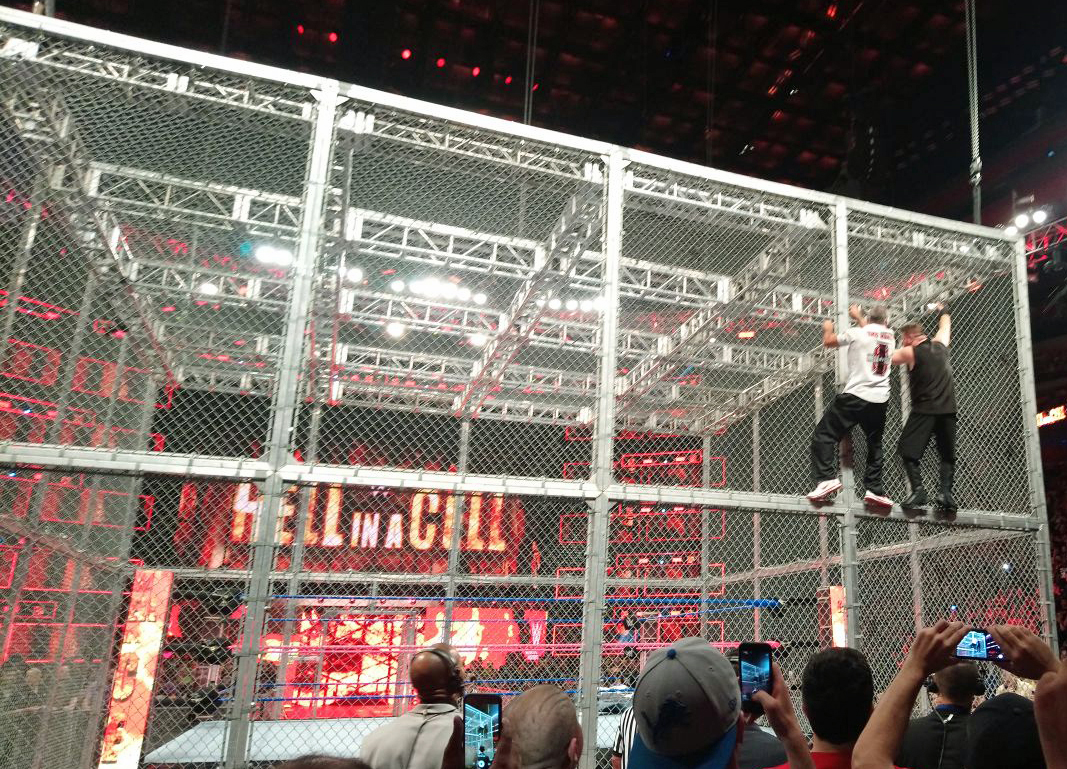
Shane McMahon and Kevin Owens on the outside of the Hell in a Cell structure, as seen in 2017.

The Hell in a Cell match is a specific kind of enclosure match run by WWE inside an enlarged 4-sided cuboid steel cage made from open-weave steel mesh chain-link fencing, which extends beyond the ring apron, leaving a gap between the edge of the ring and the Cell fence. As opposed to a conventional steel cage, the cell fencing continues across the top as a ceiling, hence the name 'Cell'. Unlike a standard cage match, there is no escape clause because after the combatants enter the Cell, the door of the Cell is locked with chains and a padlock from the outside by referees to prevent the combatants from escaping (although it has been fairly common for Hell in a Cell matches to spill out of the cell and even onto the roof of the cage). The match has a no disqualification "anything goes" stipulation, and can only be won via pinfall or submission inside the ring. One exception could be made is Hell in a Cell 2018 and 2019 where the WWE Universal Championship match ended via stoppage.

Because of the "anything goes" rule, this match developed an infamous reputation in its early years. This match usually takes place on pay-per-view shows (there have only been five exceptions: four Cell matches occurred on Raw: two in 1998, one in 2011 (as a dark match), and one in 2021, while the first-ever Cell Match on Smackdown happened on June 18, 2021). Many wrestlers were legitimately injured during these matches (most notably Mick Foley) thanks to the dangerous bumps involved and the chain-link fencing of the Cell. In kayfabe, it is regarded as the most dangerous match in the entire promotion. Jim Ross has referred to the cell itself as "a demonic structure" that is "custom built for injury". There have been 53 Hell in a Cell matches to date, with The Undertaker competing in 14 (with his last at WrestleMania 32), more than any other WWE performer. The first Hell in a Cell match was between The Undertaker and Shawn Michaels at Badd Blood: In Your House in St. Louis in October 1997.

=== Inferno match ===
In an Inferno match (a type of no-disqualification, no-fall, no-submission, no-countout match), the ring is completely surrounded by flames once both contenders have entered the ring. The only way to win is to set your opponent on fire. Inferno matches usually end on the outside of the ring; this way, paramedics can assist the loser of the match. Due to the potentially graphic or dangerous nature of this type of match, it is very rarely seen in North America. As of December 2020, there have only been six inferno matches in WWE, with almost all of them involving Kane, this being his signature match.

The first Inferno match took place in 1987 at the Juan Pachin Vicens coliseum in Ponce, Puerto Rico, where the ropes were simply soaked with gasoline and lit on fire. This kind of match was also done again in 1992 at FMW in Japan, and was called a Hellfire Deathmatch, which featured barbed wire as the ring ropes which were lit on fire. The match was a total disaster as wrestlers such as Sabu, his uncle The Original Sheik and Atsushi Onita, due to unbearably hot conditions, dashed out of the ring after just a minute. The Sheik was badly burned as a result and went into a coma. The first WWF Inferno Match was between Kane and The Undertaker at Unforgiven (1998) pay-per-view in Greensboro, North Carolina, and it was a safer and much more professional affair where special effects and pyrotechnics experts were brought in from Hollywood to set up and control the fire around the ring. Kane had been thrown out of the ring and the Undertaker had no way of attacking him unless he too went out of the ring. The match ended in the Undertaker's victory. WCW also attempted an Inferno match, known as the Human Torch match, at The Great American Bash in 2000 between Sting and Vampiro.

Another version of the match known as the Firefly Inferno match was held at TLC: Tables, Ladders & Chairs in 2020, between "The Fiend" Bray Wyatt and Randy Orton; its title referenced Wyatt's "Firefly Fun House" gimmick. In addition to the ring being surrounded by fire, other objects that are placed around the ring are also set on fire.

Another variation of the Inferno match, dubbed a Ring of Fire match, took place at SummerSlam in 2013, when Kane faced Bray Wyatt. While the ring is surrounded by flames just like in a standard Inferno match, the match is decided by pinfall or submission and not by burning your opponent. In addition, the flames prevent others from possibly interfering in the match, as was the case with Luke Harper and Erick Rowan of The Wyatt Family.

=== Infierno en el Ring ===
A lucha libre staple, Infierno en el Ring is a multi-man steel cage Luchas de Apuestas match, varying anywhere from 4 to 16 entrants. Competitors enter at intervals, then - once all are in the ring and a specified period of time has elapsed - are permitted to escape the cage. The final two luchadors in the ring proceed to have a standard one-fall wrestling match, with the winner claiming the loser's mask or hair.

=== Lethal Lockdown match ===
Similar to the WarGames match used in WCW, TNA/Impact Wrestling's Lethal Lockdown consists of a single ring enclosed by a steel cage with two teams facing off with each other. The staggered entry system is identical, but weapons are permitted and are even provided. When all competitors have entered the ring, a roof is lowered onto the top of the cage, with various weapons hanging from it. Victory can be attained by pinfall or submission. This match has become a staple of TNA's Lockdown pay-per-view event, but has also made appearances at other TNA pay-per-views.

=== Punjabi Prison match ===
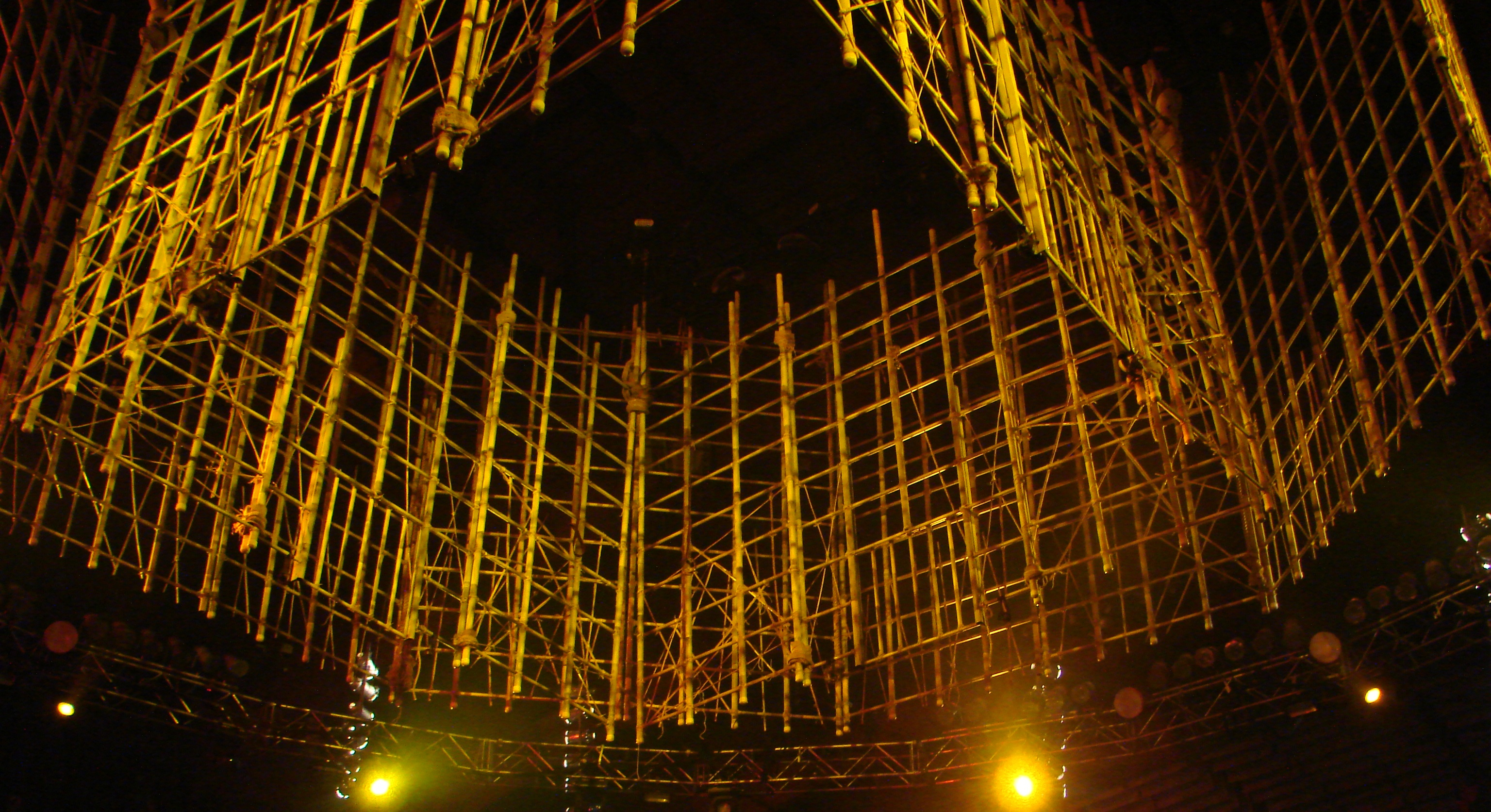
The Punjabi Prison at No Mercy in 2007

The Punjabi Prison match, named after the Punjab state that The Great Khali (the match's founder) is billed from, consists of two large steel-reinforced bamboo cages. The first is four sided and stands 16 feet (4.8 m) tall, while the second has eight sides and stands 20 feet (6 m) and surrounds the first.

The inner cage has a four-foot (1.2 m) by four-foot door on each of its sides, with a referee standing by to open them at a wrestler's request. Each door may only be opened once and is only allowed to remain open for sixty seconds, after which it is padlocked. Should all four doors end up locked before the wrestlers escape, they are forced to climb out over the top, where the bamboo is fashioned into spikes. Between the two cages are sometimes placed two tables, on which are weapons (both "medieval" and "bamboo" variations of standard wrestling weapons). There are also extended straps at the corners of the cage which can be used to choke the opponent. Once a wrestler has escaped the first cage, he must climb over and out of the second cage, with the first wrestler having both of their feet touch the arena floor becoming the winner of the match.

The match was revived with modifications in 2017 as the main event of Battleground, which featured the Indian-Canadian Jinder Mahal facing Randy Orton for the WWE Championship; The Great Khali made a surprise run-in to assist Mahal.

=== Thundercage ===
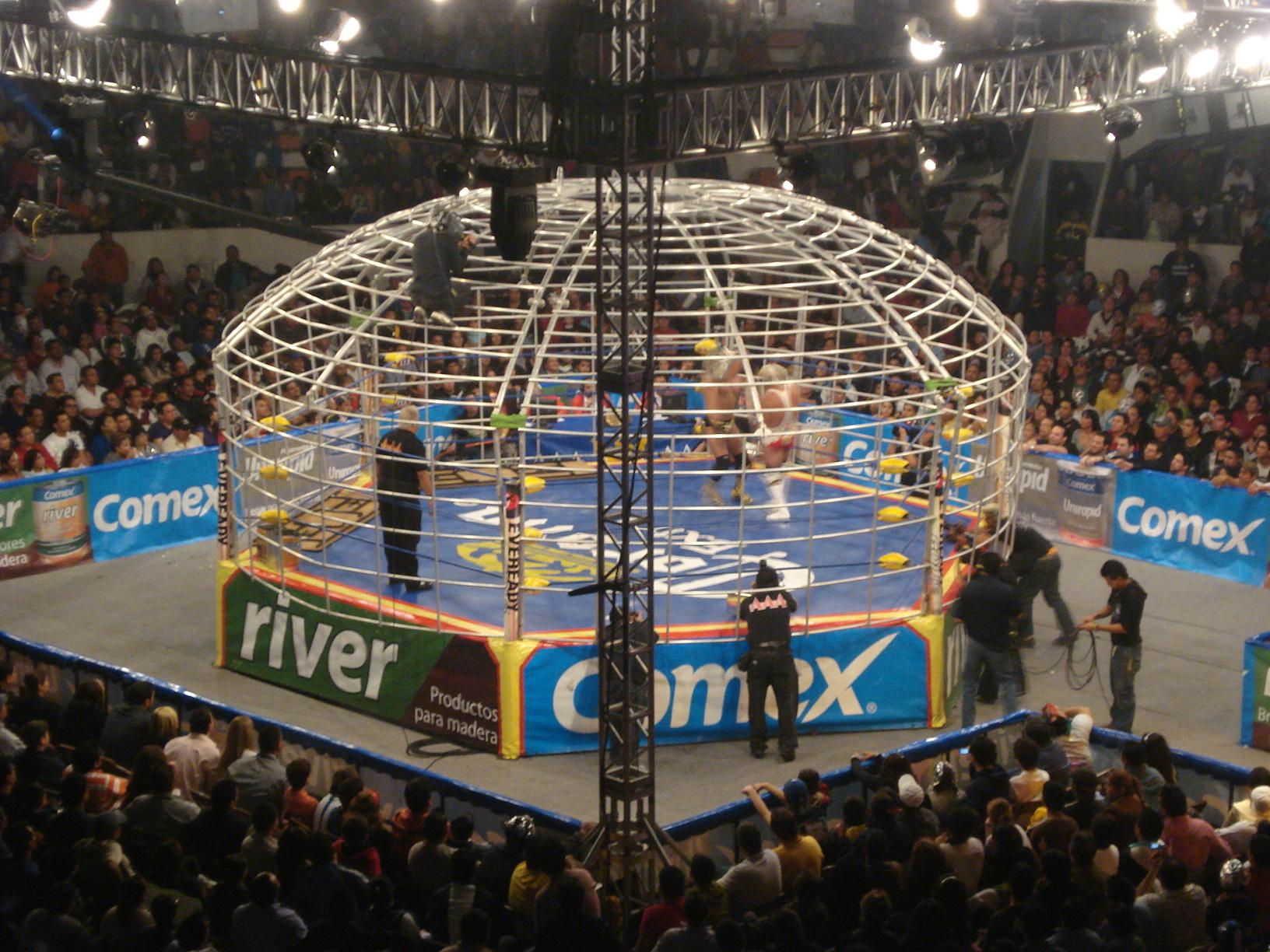
AAA's Domo de la Muerte

WCW's Thundercage, based on the film Mad Max Beyond Thunderdome, is a large domed structure of steel bars engulfing the ring. Although it does not have a top, the sides curve in to prevent escape.

Mexico's AAA promotion tweaked the concept with the Domo de la Muerte ("Dome of Death"), which uses a similar cage but only allows victory by escaping through a hole at the top center. This variation is also used in TNA, where it was called the TerrorDome, or more recently the Steel Asylum. In AAA it is typically used for multi-man "luchas de apuestas" (bet matches), with the last man standing in the cage losing his mask or hair. See Infierno en el Ring above.

The Thunderdome is a variation on the Thundercage, with the area near the top of the cage electrified. The only way for a wrestler to win the Thunderdome match is to have their opponents' "terminator" (usually a manager who stands outside of the ring) throw in the towel to stop the match. In another variation of this match, each pinned competitor in the match is handcuffed to the cage. The last man left is given a key to unlock his teammates to attack the other team, who are still handcuffed. Ironically, the ThunderDome name was used for WWE's bio-secure bubble during the pandemic between 2020 and 2021.

=== Triple Cage match ===
Triple cage matches have been held by WCW and its predecessor, Jim Crockett Promotions, in which two smaller cages are stacked on top of the cage enclosing the ring.

At The Great American Bash in 1988, a "Tower of Doom" match was held, in which two teams attempted to make their way from the uppermost cage to the bottom, with victory achieved when all five members of a team escaped a door there. The cages were cut off from each other, with doors controlled from outside by referees, who only opened them for two-minute intervals.

At Uncensored in 1996, a "Doomsday Cage Match" was held where Hulk Hogan and Randy Savage faced off against the Alliance to End Hulkamania, which consisted of Ric Flair, Arn Anderson, Lex Luger, The Taskmaster, Meng, The Barbarian, The Ultimate Solution and Z-Gangsta. Hogan and Savage had to start at the top of the three tiered structure, and on each level there were members of the Alliance waiting for them. The structure featured scaffolding with steps on it to enable the wrestlers to traverse it, with the object being to make it to the bottom cage where the ring was and score a fall to win.

A triple cage match at Slamboree in 2000 was held between David Arquette, Diamond Dallas Page, and Jeff Jarrett; it was conducted similarly to a ladder match, with the objective being for the competitors to make their way to the roof of the third cage, and retrieve the championship belt. The roof of the first cage—which extended beyond the apron–had a trapdoor leading to the second cage, which contained weapons. The competitors then had to exit through a side door in the second cage, and climb the structure to reach the belt above the third cage. The third cage contained guitars, used for Jarrett's signature move.

The same year, WCW conducted another match using the same structure, "WarGames 2000: Russo's Revenge", on an episode of WCW Monday Nitro. Despite sharing its name with WCW's well-known WarGames match, its only similarity was its use of teams. A belt was placed inside the uppermost cage, with the first team to have a member escape from the bottom cage with the belt being declared the winner.

=== WarGames match ===
Sometimes suffixed with the tagline "The Match Beyond," the WarGames match features two rings surrounded by an enclosed steel cage (usually with a roof), with two teams (or sometimes three) of four or five wrestlers facing one another. After a portion of the match fought one-on-one, members of the two teams begin to alternate entering the other ring at staggered intervals (with the order decided by a coin toss); once both teams' members have all entered the ring, the first team to score submission or surrender over a member of the opposing team is declared the winner. Depending on the rules used, a team may also win by scoring a knockout or pinfall.

This match was made famous by Jim Crockett Promotions' annual Great American Bash, and later WCW's Wrestle War, before becoming a tradition at their annual Fall Brawl pay-per-view event from 1993 to 1998. At Fall Brawl 1998, a three-team WarGames match was held, with pinfalls counting. An in name only revamp of WarGames, "WarGames 2000", was held on an episode of WCW Monday Nitro.

ECW held its own version of WarGames known as an "Ultimate Jeopardy steel cage match" (typically as part of an eponymous event), with weapons available, pinfalls counting, and the losing team receiving a stipulation as a penalty. In 2017, WWE's NXT brand began to hold a live event known as NXT TakeOver: WarGames, which feature a version of the WarGames match as their signature event. The NXT version of WarGames does not use a roofed cage, and pinfalls count. In 2022, the match moved to WWE's main roster PPV Survivor Series.

In 2021, AEW held a WarGames match between The Pinnacle and The Inner Circle as a "Blood and Guts match", during an eponymous special episode of its weekly series Dynamite. AEW adopted the WarGames rules that were used by WCW, with a roofed cage and no pinfalls.

== Flag match ==
The flag match is essentially the professional wrestling version of capture the flag. For the match two flags are placed on opposite turnbuckles, each representing a specific wrestler or team of wrestlers and the objective of the match is to retrieve the opponent's flag and raise it while defending the flag in the wrestler's corner. If the referee is knocked down and cannot acknowledge the win, the defender can put the flag back in its place, thus resetting the match.

== Handicap match ==
A handicap match is any match pitting one wrestler or team of wrestlers against a team of wrestlers with numerical superiority, such as two against one or three against two. Normally the babyfaces are outnumbered with the heels having more members on their team to provide an unfair advantage. In some two-on-one handicap matches, the team with superior numbers act under tag team rules, with one person in the ring at a time. In others, such as tornado tag team handicap matches, all competitors are in the ring at the same time. In the 1980s and 1990s, handicap matches were used in preliminary matches involving large star wrestlers (usually heels), such as King Kong Bundy, Big Van Vader or Yokozuna, who – as a way to get a monster heel persona/gimmick over with the crowd – would completely dominate their opponents despite the latter's superiority in numbers.

== Hardcore-based variations ==
Hardcore wrestling, the most violent and bloody type of professional wrestling, is a subset in which some or all of the traditional rules do not apply. Most often this simply means there are no-disqualifications, which itself eliminates countouts, sometimes allowing decisions to take place anywhere. Most hardcore matches or deathmatches often have a combination of match types within one, and elaborate titles are often used, particularly in Japanese wrestling promotions. (example: "Barbed Wire Rope, Exploding Barbed Wire Boards and Exploding Ring Time Bomb Deathmatch")

Some promotions, such as Frontier Martial-Arts Wrestling, the International Wrestling Association of Japan, International Wrestling Syndicate, Extreme Championship Wrestling, Big Japan Pro Wrestling, and Combat Zone Wrestling, have specialized in hardcore matches, with "standard" non-hardcore matches being the exception.

=== Hardcore match ===
A standard hardcore match, also known as a Devil's Playground match, a Belfast Brawl match or a Guerrilla Warfare match is a type of match where there are no-disqualifications, no-countouts, falls count anywhere, where the only rule (unless specifically noted) is to pin or submit the opponent. In a hardcore match any weapon can be used, any amount of wrestlers who are not booked in the match can be involved and interfere, pinfalls are allowed outside the ring and any illegal move can be used (except moves banned by the promotion booking the match before-hand). Hardcore matches came to prominence in Japan in the 1970s, and then in the United States in the 1990s in promotions like ECW and later WWE. Blunt objects such as steel chairs, wooden event tables, ladders, wrestling ring stairs, kendo sticks, baseball bats, flour, metal cylindrical trashcans, trashcan lids and road signs are often featured in hardcore matches.

Sometimes a hardcore match is erroneously billed as a No Holds Barred match, Street Fight, who share different rulesets. World Championship Wrestling used the term Raven's rules match for hardcore matches involving the wrestler Raven. They also created their own specific brand of hardcore match, for which bouts were to begin backstage rather than in the ring.

==== Unsanctioned match ====
An unsanctioned match, also known as a non-sanctioned match, is a variant of the hardcore match. In kayfabe, the match is not officially "recognised" by the promotion, and is sometimes used when a wrestler is "injured" (at the hands of another wrestler) and wants revenge but cannot be "medically cleared", thus he agrees to a non-sanctioned match where "the promotion is not held liable" for any injuries incurred during the match. A lights out match is an intensified variant of the unsanctioned match, most notably utilised by All Elite Wrestling. In these cases, the match is placed at the end of a card, and in-storyline, the preceding match is instead treated as the "main event" and before the match starts, the house lights of the venue will momentarily flash to signify the "official" end of the show.

=== Deathmatch ===
A deathmatch is a more extreme version of a hardcore match, being more violent and bloody than the latter. In addition to the blunt weapons and thumbtacks familiar to hardcore matches, deathmatches often include more dangerous elements, such as bricks, nails, staple guns, explosives, barbed wire, light tubes, glass shards, gardening tools (from trowels to weed whackers), and even fire produced from lighter fluid or gasoline. Other euphemisms for deathmatch include extreme rules match, ultraviolent rules match (hardcore rules matches exclusively in CZW), and HardKore X-Treme match.

=== Barbed Wire Ring Rope match ===
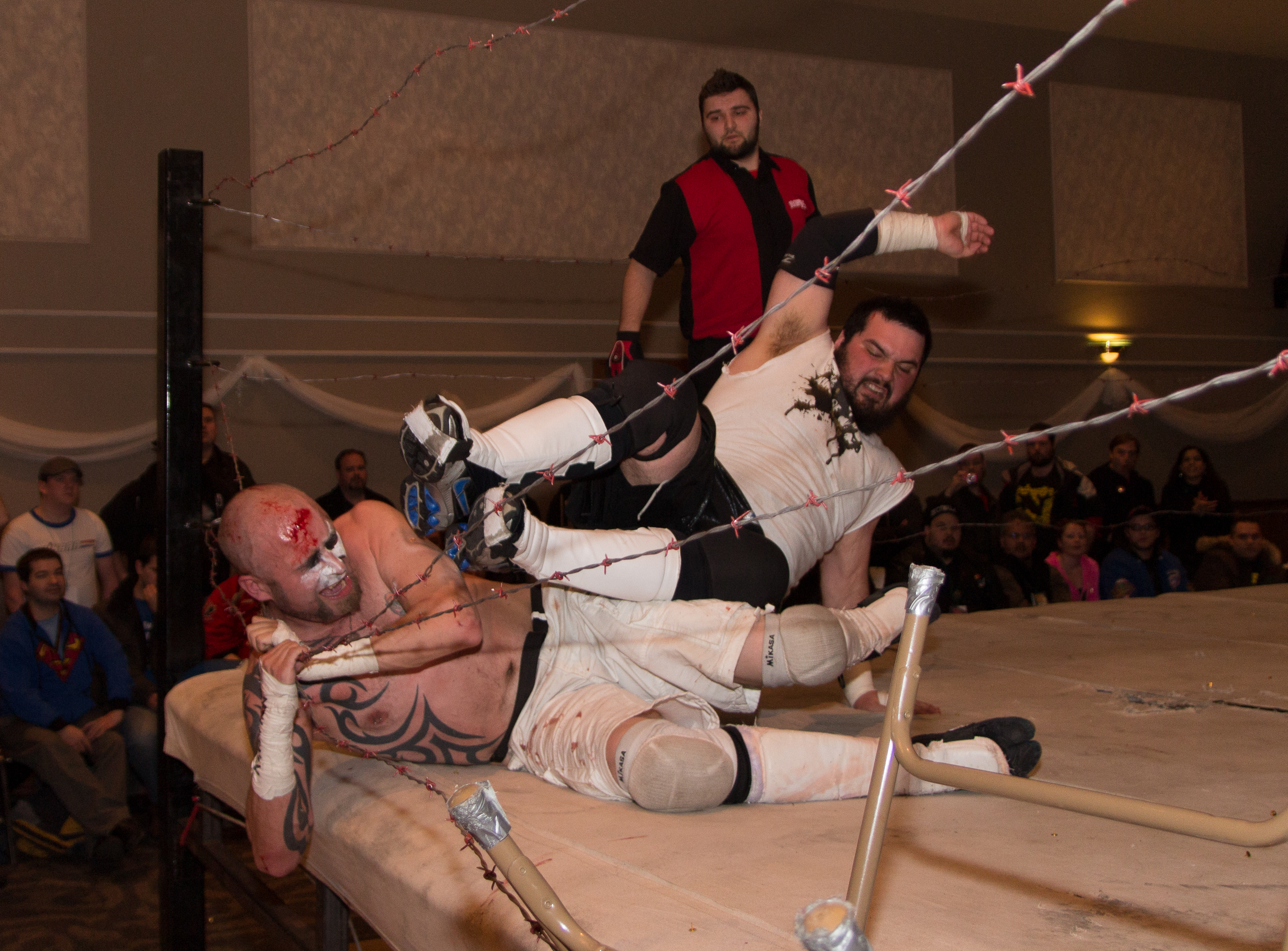
Joey Kings (in white top, right) dropkicks Warhed into the barbed wire ropes

A barbed wire ring rope match or no rope barbed wire match is a hardcore match where the ring ropes are replaced with barbed wire. There are four known ways to prop up barbed wire in place of ring ropes: with three strands of barbed wire run from turnbuckle to turnbuckle; with five strands of wire tied to form an "X"; "spider net", where the ring ropes are not replaced and barbed wire is wrapped up and down the ropes to create a wall of barbed wire, and finally barbed wire wrapped in the "X" fashion- that has been electrified or rigged with explosives. These types of matches were made popular in the late 1970s and early 1980s by American territory wrestling promotions, as well as Japanese promotions during the 1990s. These types of matches often included other stipulations and weapons in them.

=== Boot camp match ===
A no holds barred match in which falls count anywhere occurred, features military theme and elements, and utilizes any weapons such as combat boots, helmets, sandbags, and ammunition crates. The match can only end by pinfall or submission can happen anywhere inside or outside the ring.

=== Circus Deathmatch ===
A Circus Deathmatch is a type of scaffold match where in the ring is a scaffold and under that scaffold, there is a type of spider net made of barbed wire six feet below. The first wrestler to fall off of the scaffold into the barbed wire spider net loses. The first match was between Mad Man Pondo and Ryuji Ito in Japan.

=== Clockwork Orange House of Fun match ===
The Clockwork Orange House of Fun match, known as "Raven's House of Fun" or simply "House of Fun", was created by professional wrestler Raven (legitimately, as Raven pitched the idea himself to TNA's creative team). It is a singles match for which poles attached to the ring posts measured about five to six feet above the turnbuckles, with single chains wrapped from and hanging on the poles to various points on the ring itself with many weapons hanging from and attached to steel chains above the ring, sometimes with sides of a steel cage attached to and erected on the ring. In the first match the use of weapons is legal, and the only way to win was to put an opponent through two tables after throwing them off "Raven's perch" (a small scaffold), but afterwards it was changed to falls-count-anywhere rules.

==== Time Bomb Deathmatch ====
A Time Bomb Deathmatch is a type of deathmatch where explosives or fireworks set up around the ring are set off after an allotted time. This match originated in Japan and was done various times in the 1990s. Mick Foley and Terry Funk participated in a "Barbed Wire Rope, Exploding Barbed Wire Boards and Exploding Ring Time Bomb Deathmatch" as the final match of the 1995 Kawasaki Dream King of the Deathmatch tournament, where there were multiple plywood boards with barbed wire and explosives attached to them strewn around the ring.

=== Falls Count Anywhere match ===
A falls count anywhere match allows pinfalls to take place in any location, negating the standard rule that they must take place inside the ring and between the ropes, and these matches largely take place outside of the ring. Submissions may or may not also be covered by this rule. This also eliminates the usual "countout" rule. A variation of the rules states that once a pinfall takes place, the pinned wrestler loses the match if they are unable to return to the ring within a specific amount of time – usually a referee's count of 10 or 30. If the pinned wrestler makes it to the ring in this time, the match continues. Occasionally, this stipulation is listed as having a specific territory in which falls count (e.g. the state, county, or general location the match is in). As the match may take place in various parts of the arena, a falls count anywhere match is always a no-disqualification and no-count out match, so as to allow wrestlers the convenience to use any object they may find wherever they wrestle.

=== First Blood match ===
A First Blood match is a no-disqualification, no-submission, no-fall, no-countout match in which the first wrestler to bleed anywhere loses the match. Depending on the nuance of the stipulation, this might include bleeding noses. Although there are no-disqualifications, outside interference cannot be seen causing the participant to bleed. The first televised First Blood match was Stone Cold Steve Austin vs. Kane at King of the Ring 1998. This type of match became rare in the WWE since 2008 in which blood is rarely shown in its programming to adhere with the TV-PG standards. The most recent first blood match in WWE was John Cena vs. JBL at One Night Stand in 2008. However, in TNA in 2010 they did a women's first blood match between Tara and Daffney.

==== Doomsday Chamber of Blood match ====
A Doomsday Chamber of Blood match, created by Total Nonstop Action Wrestling, is a First Blood match that takes place inside of a barbed wire topped cage.

==== Sadistic Madness match ====
A Sadistic Madness match, created by Total Nonstop Action Wrestling, is another variation of the First Blood match, the main difference being that the opponent must be bleeding before a wrestler can legally pin them.

=== Four Corners of Pain match ===
A Four Corners of Pain match is a hardcore match where in each corner of the ring, there is a container that has a weapon or another type of harmful item. This match was first seen at the 1997 IWA Mid-South King of the Deathmatch Tournament, with later appearances at the 2003 Combat Zone Wrestling Tournament of Death II, and at the 2006 IWA-MS Queen of the Deathmatch, Amy Lee took on Sexxxy Eddy in this match.

==== Pools of Fuckery Deathmatch ====
A Pools of Fuckery Deathmatch is similar to a Four Corners of Pain match, only the harmful items in each corner are in small plastic pools. This match originated in March 2021 in the independent wrestling promotion Asylum Wrestling Revolution (AMR), where Mickie Knuckles faced Akira.

=== Good Old Fashioned Donnybrook match ===
A Good Old Fashioned Donnybrook match is a hardcore stipulation created by Sheamus; named after the former Dublin fair, it is a no disqualifications match where a bar, large wood barrels of brandy, and shillelaghs are made available at ringside. It was first contested on the July 29, 2022 episode of WWE SmackDown between Sheamus and Drew McIntyre, with the winner becoming the number-one contender for the Undisputed WWE Championship at Clash at the Castle. At Extreme Rules 2022, the stipulation was used for a six-man tag team match between Sheamus's The Brawling Brutes and Imperium. The stipulation returned at Clash in Paris in 2025, contested between Sheamus and Rusev.

=== Last Man/Woman Standing match ===
A last man standing match (or last woman standing) is a no-disqualification, no-countout, no-fall, no-submission match in which the only way to win is similar to the knockout rule of a boxing match. The wrestler must knock down the opponent with the usage of weapons or with a finisher, and the opponent loses if they do not stand up after a 10 count from the referee. To avoid losing, the downed wrestler must be on their feet by the count of 10, but they can not lose by leaving the ring for 10-count (ring out) if they are still on their feet while recovering. Because of the hardcore nature of the match restraining a downed opponent is a permissible way to ensure that they do not respond to the ten-count, even if they would otherwise be able to.

==== Texas Deathmatch ====
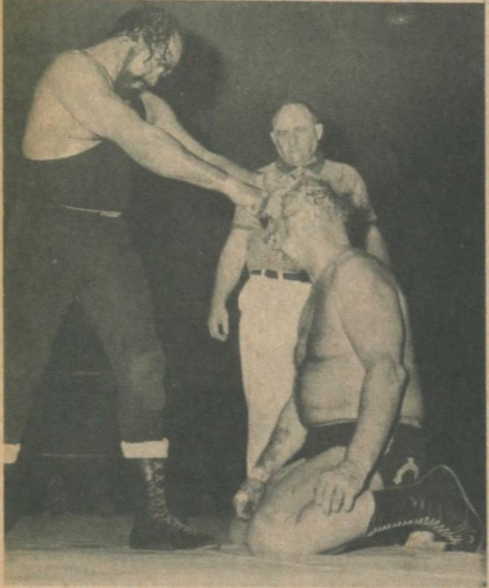
Ciclón Negro (left) and Dory Funk in a 1972 Texas deathmatch that lasted over an hour and included 27 total falls

A variant of the Last Man Standing match is the Texas Deathmatch (a.k.a. Mexican Deathmatch, or Armageddon Rules match). By the original ruleset (which long predates the simpler Last Man Standing stipulation), a wrestler must be pinned to a 3-count or made to submit/rendered unconscious, after which point a rest period of 30 to 60 seconds will be observed, and the match will resume. If the loser of that preceding fall cannot then answer a 10-count from the referee, they will be declared unable to continue and their opponent the victor. Some of these matches have been known to last for hours, including one that Dory Funk Jr. participated in that went on for more than four hours. This match was often done by Dory and his brother Terry Funk in the 1960s in their father Dory Sr.'s promotion Western States Sports.

Texas Death matches in a more modern setting - such as New Japan Pro Wrestling and All Elite Wrestling - tend to abandon the prerequisite of scoring a fall, and can only be won by submission or knockout (10-count from the referee), with the emphasis instead put on the "Death match" element. They have become a trademark match of "Hangman" Adam Page.

=== Light Tube Deathmatch ===
A light tube match is a hardcore match where hundreds (usually 200) of long, cylindrical, glass fluorescent light tubes are attached to the ring ropes (usually via tape), and mock shaped weapons and mock large objects made of light tubes are made available. These matches often end with most or all of the light tubes broken or shattered; these matches are some of the bloodiest, most gruesome and most dangerous types of wrestling matches because the glass in a light tube contains poisonous and carcinogenic chemicals, and when broken, the poisonous and carcinogenic dust from the shattered glass gets into the air and allows audience members, the referee and the wrestlers to breathe it in. Another hazard of this match is shards of broken glass still rife with dangerous chemicals laying around the ring mat and sticking in the wrestlers' bodies (when they are slammed onto the wrestling mat); in more organized wrestling promotions, attendants briefly enter the ring and quickly sweep the broken glass off the mat. This type of match originated in Japan in the late 1990s and early 2000s in Big Japan Pro Wrestling, and some independent promotions in the United States feature this type of match.

==== 2/3 Light Tube Log cabins Deathmatch ====
A 2/3 Light Tube Log Cabins Deathmatch is a hardcore match where the only way to win is to break two shaped light tube weapons over and/or on an opponent. Combat Zone Wrestling has used this match in their Tournament of Death series.

=== Monster's Ball match ===
A Monster's Ball match is a hardcore match that was invented and staged by TNA Wrestling. The key premise of the match was that all contenders are sequestered alone in a locked room without light, food or water for 24 hours before the match. This stipulation is intended to induce extreme feelings of aggression in the competitors. Once released, the wrestlers fight one another in a hardcore match, with the usage of weapons encouraged. Victory can be achieved by pinfall or submission, with the match ending as soon as one wrestler is pinned or submits.

The Monster's Ball match typically features numerous high spots. There have been 54 matches taking place under TNA, as well as several unaffiliated independent promotions hosting the match. The match has almost always featured Abyss in some capacity, wrestling in 48 and managing in one, as it is his signature match. There are various weapons frequently used in the match, including thumbtacks, "Janice" (a board filled with nails, Abyss's signature weapon), and a bed of barbed wire.

=== No Disqualification match ===
A No Disqualification match, also known as a No Holds Barred match, or sometimes as an Anything Goes match, an Extreme Rules match (in WWE, since the establishment of the now-former ECW brand), or Tribal Combat and Bloodline Rules (in WWE, for wrestlers in the Anoaʻi family), is a match in which neither wrestler can be disqualified, allowing for weapons and outside interference. However, unlike a hardcore match or a street fight, pinfalls and submissions must be made inside the ring.

No-disqualification matches may be used in feuds in which a challenger may have won matches against the champion, but did not claim the championship, because the champion was disqualified (championships usually only change hands via pinfall or submission). Unless stipulated, a no-disqualification match can end in a countout. Those that cannot are no-disqualification, no-countout matches, therefore they're called No Holds Barred matches.

=== Piranha Deathmatch ===
A Piranha Deathmatch or Amazon River Piranha Deathmatch, similar to a Desert Deathmatch is a type of highly dangerous match where a fish tank containing dangerous and flesh-eating Piranha fish is placed in the center of the ring, and the first wrestler who gets put into the tank for 10 seconds loses. There was only one match ever done, and it was at Big Japan Pro Wrestling's Summer Night Dream event in Yokohama, Japan in September 1996, where in the main event Kendo Nagasaki put Mitsuhiro Matsunaga in the tank, defeating him.

=== Pitch Black match ===
A Pitch Black match is a hardcore-based match during which the arena lights are turned off or extremely dimmed, with most of the action visible due to the competitors wearing clothes or body paint that glows in the dark. The only known Pitch Black match, sponsored by Mountain Dew, happened at the 2023 Royal Rumble, with Bray Wyatt defeating LA Knight.

=== Razor Deathmatch ===
A Razor Deathmatch is an often extremely bloody match where boards full of razor blades are made available as weapons. This match is a trademark of Japanese hardcore wrestler Jun Kasai who has participated in five such contests.

=== Spike Nail Deathmatch ===
A Spike Nail Deathmatch is a hardcore match where a large bed of six-inch spiked nails sticking out of a rectangular piece of plywood is made available. The most famous example of this kind of match was at the IWA Kawasaki Dream King of the Deathmatch, where Cactus Jack faced Shoji Nakamaki in August 1995. Another type of Spike Nail match was rather than achieving a fall to win, the first wrestler to take a bump on the huge planks of wood infested with six-inch nails at ringside loses.

==== Nail Hell Deathmatch ====
A Nail Hell Deathmatch is a hardcore match where some boards with nails were hung on the ring ropes all the way across, and onto opposing sides of the ring there was a board, on one side there was nails and on the other side was barbed wire. Only one match like this was done, in December 1994 by IWA Japan.

=== Street fight ===
A street fight is a match with no disqualifications, no-countouts, in which falls count anywhere, and weapons are legal. The main difference between a hardcore match and a street fight is that while wrestlers wear their normal wrestling gear in hardcore matches, wrestlers (particularly in modern times) almost always wear their own street clothes in street fights, and weapons typically used in street fights are items typically found on or are often used on city streets, such as trash cans, road signs, broomsticks, dumpsters and sometimes vehicles and shopping carts filled with those items, among other things. Sometimes street fights have the name of the host arena's city in the name, such as "Chicago Street Fight", "New York Street Fight", or "Sin City Street Fight".

=== Taipei Deathmatch ===
A Taipei Deathmatch, (also known as an Ancient Way Deathmatch) is a very bloody and violent hardcore match where the wrestlers' fists are taped and dipped into glue or honey, and then into broken and crushed glass, allowing shards to stick to their fists. Win by pinfall or submission. It is unknown why this match is named after the capital city of Taiwan; the first time this match was ever held was at ECW's Hardcore Heaven in July 1995 where the Rotten brothers, Axl and Ian, faced off in this match, and it was held in Philadelphia, Pennsylvania, not in Taipei.

=== Thumbtack Deathmatch ===
A Thumbtack Deathmatch is a hardcore match where one or more trays containing thousands (usually 10,000) of thumbtacks is/are made available and usually placed in either the center or apron of the ring. The most well-known version of this match was at the IWA Kawasaki Dream King of the Deathmatch, where Terry Gordy faced Cactus Jack in August 1995. Variants of the thumbtack deathmatch staged by TNA/Impact Wrestling have been done where the objective is modified to simply slam an opponent into the pile of thumbtacks on the mat. A variation of this match is a cross between a Ladder Match and 10,000 Thumbtacks Match called a Thumbtacks Ladder match in which a ladder is placed in the ring with a reward at the top. Thumbtacks are also spread out across the ring. A variant of the 10,000 thumbtacks deathmatch is the East Coast Thumbtack match, this match has 177,000 thumbtacks placed in the ring. The first match was introduced between Ian Rotten and The Messiah.

== Location-based variations ==
Though most matches take place in and around the ring, some are designed specifically for more exotic locales. The majority of these matches take on the name of their setting, often appending "brawl" to the end, and all of them are hardcore by definition. The following is a list of locale-based variations that supplant or replace the standard rules.

=== Bar Room Brawl ===
A Bar Room Brawl is a multi-competitor no disqualification match held in a bar. During the match wrestlers are encouraged to drink while fighting, and the "last man standing" is declared winner. Wrestlers can be eliminated from the match both by the standard pinfall, submission, or by simply becoming too (kayfabe) drunk to continue the match. A known example of this match is the APA Invitational Bar Room Brawl at Vengeance 2003 which Bradshaw won after knocking down Brother Love. Another example, a Bar Fight was done in 2020, with Jeff Hardy facing off against Sheamus.

=== Boiler Room Brawl ===
A Boiler Room Brawl or Boiler Room match starts in a boiler room, with the winner being the first wrestler to successfully get out. This match is a no-disqualification, no-falls, no-countout match, so anything goes, so long as someone escapes first. The rather hazardous environment of this match featured some of the arena's internal infrastructure, such as all sorts of large, exposed metal piping with large bolts, concrete flooring and solid electrical equipment everywhere, among other features. Mick Foley participated in all of the WWF-run Boiler Room Brawls under his persona Mankind, because this persona dwelled in boiler rooms, hence this being Mankind's signature match. The first Boiler Room Brawl happened at SummerSlam 1996 with Mankind vs. The Undertaker, where in addition to escaping the boiler room the combatant had to make his way to the ring and grab Paul Bearer's urn; but when the next Boiler Room Brawl was contested at Backlash 1999 with Mankind against The Big Show, the objective was simplified to just escaping the boiler room first. World Championship Wrestling used a match with similar rules, naming their match and its location the Block.

=== Body of Water match ===
A Body of Water match is a hardcore match where the sole objective is to get your opponent into a large body of water. This match was only done once, where CM Punk faced Chavo Guerrero during an ECW show in Corpus Christi, Texas (which is located right on the Gulf of Mexico, the body of water used) in February 2008.

=== Dungeon match ===
A Dungeon match is a hardcore match that took place in the legendary Hart Family Dungeon in Calgary, where Owen Hart challenged Ken Shamrock to come to the Dungeon (referred to as Hart's "basement") for a fight. The match can only be won by submission.

=== Empty Arena match ===
An empty arena match is a hardcore (no disqualification, falls count anywhere) "anything goes" match between two or more wrestlers that takes place in an arena or stadium that although is fully set up for a wrestling event, is devoid of fans. The only people present are the competitors, referee, commentators, and cameramen. The match is broadcast or videotaped and played later. An example of this is the WWF championship match between The Rock and Mankind that took place in Tucson, Arizona, at the Tucson Convention Center, which aired as part of a special Halftime Heat edition of Sunday Night Heat aired against the Super Bowl halftime show of Super Bowl XXXIII in 1999. One of the earliest and best-known empty arena matches occurred in 1981 in Memphis, Tennessee, at the Mid-South Coliseum between Jerry Lawler and Terry Funk.

A lack of audience that is a legitimate aspect of the production and not a kayfabe stipulation of the match (i.e. the match is conducted normally, except a live audience is not present) is not necessarily considered an empty arena match. For example, audiences were barred from attending televised AEW, Impact Wrestling, and later WWE, MLW, and NWA, shows in 2020 during the height of the COVID-19 pandemic.

=== Parking Lot Brawl ===
A Parking Lot Brawl is a Falls Count Anywhere match that is usually fought in an interior location or in an outside parking lot around a tightly parked circle of cars. The first wrestler to score a pinfall, submission, or knockout in a Parking Lot Brawl is the winner. Both wrestlers are allowed to use everything around them as weapons, including the cars. The first Parking Lot Brawl was between Jerry Lawler and Eddie Gilbert in Memphis, Tennessee in 1988, which was fought all over the arena and its outside parking lot. More well-known examples of a Parking Lot Brawl both involved John Cena, where he faced Eddie Guerrero in 2003 and JBL in 2008.

==== Hollywood Backlot Brawl ====
A Hollywood Backlot Brawl was a no-disqualification match that started in a Hollywood studio backlot, and it was fought between Goldust and Roddy Piper. This match also involved the two performers actually driving cars for a long period of time, and then ended with the two arriving in the Honda Center in Anaheim 30 miles away to finish their match in the ring.

==== Iron Circle match ====
An Iron Circle match is a type of Parking Lot Brawl that is fought specifically in a parking garage around a rowdy live audience sitting on the cars encircling the competitors. An Iron Circle match was a falls count anywhere match where Ken Shamrock fought Steve Blackman at WWF Fully Loaded 1999.

==== Train match ====
A Train match is a Falls Count Anywhere match fought in a moving train. All weapons are legal, and there is no disqualification (except for damage to the train). This happened in 2023 by CyberFight's DDT Pro Wrestling promotion, where Sanshiro Takagi competed against Minoru Suzuki on the Shinkansen TGV from Tokyo to Nagoya, with speeds exceeding 170 MPH on the train.

=== Tooth and Nail match ===
A Tooth and Nail match is a Falls Count Anywhere-stipulation match that is fought in and around a dental office, and any weapon is legal. This is Britt Baker's specialty match, based on her role as a dentist in both kayfabe and off-screen reality, and the objective of this match is to achieve a pinfall or submission.

== Lumberjack match ==
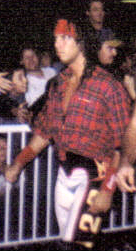
In keeping with the theme, the wrestlers outside the ring may wear flannel shirts during lumberjack matches; an example of this is the 1–2–3 Kid in 1995

A lumberjack match is a standard match with the exception that the ring is surrounded by a group of wrestlers not directly involved in it. These wrestlers, known collectively as lumberjacks (female wrestlers serving in this manner are sometimes called lumberjills; lumberjack matches between female wrestlers are called lumberjill matches, a play on the famous Nursery Rhyme, "Jack and Jill"), are there to prevent the wrestlers in the match from getting out of the ring. The groups of lumberjacks are typically split up into groups of faces and heels who occupy opposing sides around the ring. Usually, the "opposing" lumberjacks (that is, face lumberjacks if the wrestler is a heel, and vice versa) swarm the wrestlers if they leave the ring and force them back in it. Occasional interference from the lumberjacks is common, as is an all-out brawl on the outside involving most of the lumberjacks. Early lumberjack matches even featured the lumberjacks wearing stereotypical lumberjack clothing in keeping with the lumberjack theme, though this is generally no longer done. A common theme is for the lumberjacks to consist entirely of heel wrestlers to stack the odds against the face competitor. The Lumberjill Snowbunny match is another variation of the Lumberjill match with female lumberjacks, held in a pit of snow.

=== Canadian Lumberjack match ===
In a "Canadian" lumberjack match, the lumberjacks are equipped with leather straps. TNA's "fan's revenge" match was their own version of a Canadian lumberjack match, where fans equipped with straps act as lumberjacks and were encouraged to whip wrestlers. A similar "fans' revenge" variation was used in Lucha Underground where it was called a Believers' Backlash match ("Believers" was the nickname for fans of the series).

=== Extreme Lumberjack match ===
The Extreme Lumberjack match is a lumberjack match competed under hardcore rules, where there are no disqualifications, no countouts, and falls count anywhere.

== Multi-competitor-based variations ==
On some occasions, a match may be held between more than two individual wrestlers or teams. Multi-competitor matches are often broken down to eliminations and non-eliminations.

=== Basic non-elimination matches ===
==== Non-elimination matches with three competitors ====
The most common example of a non-elimination match is the Three-Way match (also known as a Triple Threat match in WWE, Triangle match in WCW), in which three wrestlers compete under standard rules with the first competitor to achieve a pinfall or submission being declared the winner. Triple Threat matches are fought under no-countout stipulations. Triangle matches are often contested like a tag match where only two can be in the match at one time while the third waits on the ring apron and the only elimination factor is if a competitor is disqualified.

==== Non-elimination matches with four or more competitors ====
In many promotions, there are typically no distinctions between the two terms. Non-elimination variations are the Four-Way match (known as a Fatal Four-Way in WWE, Four Corners match in WCW), the Five-Way match (known as a Fatal Five-Way in WWE) or the Six-Way match (known as the Six-Pack Challenge in WWE), involving four, five, or six wrestlers, respectively. American independent promotion USA Xtreme Wrestling hosted a match involving 8–12 competitors known as the 8 Ball Challenge. These types of matches can be used in certain situations to take a title off a wrestler without weakening him in the process.

On some occasions, multi-competitor matches are contested under similar rules as a tag team match. Two competitors start the match in the ring while the other wrestler(s) wait outside the ring for a tag from another wrestler, often achieved by touching an unsuspecting competitor in the ring. Variations of this include a Four Corners Survival match or Six-Man Mayhem match in Ring of Honor. Competitors are permitted to leave their position and attack wrestlers outside of the ring, such as when one or both wrestlers have been thrown over the top rope.

=== Basic elimination matches ===
Matches involving a larger number of competitors are typically elimination matches. These matches may begin with all of the competitors in the ring at the same time. The standard match rules apply as wrestlers may leave the position and attack other wrestlers outside the ring with a twist that the wrestler be pinned or forced to submit is eliminated from the match.

==== Elimination matches with three competitors ====
The most common example of an elimination match is the Three-Way Dance, where the first fall would eliminate one wrestler, reducing the match to a standard one-fall singles match. The Three-Way Dance was a specialty of Extreme Championship Wrestling.

==== Elimination matches with four or more competitors ====
A Four-Way lofe is similar except it involves four wrestlers in Extreme Championship Wrestling and some promotions use a tag format for the match instead of having all the wrestlers in the ring at the same time. Elimination variations are the Four-Way match (known as a Fatal Four-Way in WWE), the Five-Way match (known as a Fatal Five-Way in WWE) or the Six-Way match (known as the Six-Pack Challenge in WWE), involving four, five, or six wrestlers inside the ring, respectively.

The Deadly Draw match is a TNA variation where four competitors wrestle. The match begins with two competitors in the ring. After five minutes pass, the third competitor enters the ring, then after another five minutes pass, the fourth competitor enters the ring. Any wrestler who gets pinned or forced to submit is eliminated, and any wrestler in the ring not involved in the fall is also eliminated. The last man standing wins.

=== Beat the Clock Challenge ===
A Beat the Clock challenge is a multi-competitor match in which wrestlers must defeat their opponent in a singles match before the clock runs out. Additionally, the next wrestler must beat the winner's set time by defeating their opponent to advance, otherwise that wrestler is eliminated. In doing so, the victorious wrestler usually gets some type of reward in return, such as inclusion in a title match, for instance. In a variation on the November 20, 2013 episode of NXT, two wrestlers completed a match, with the match duration being used as the marker for two other wrestlers to complete their match. The first ever Divas Beat the Clock challenge occurred in the August 2015 episode of Raw when Paige, Becky Lynch and Charlotte Flair faced a different competitor to earn a WWE Divas Championship match against Nikki Bella at Night of Champions.

=== Championship Scramble ===
WWE features a match called the Championship Scramble in which none of the wrestlers are eliminated. Two wrestlers start the match and every five minutes another wrestler enters until all five participants are present. After the last wrestler enters, there is a predetermined time limit. Each time a wrestler scores a pinfall or submission, he becomes the interim champion. Such reigns are not recorded as title reigns. The winner is the wrestler who scores the last pinfall or submission before the time limit expires thus, making that wrestler the official champion. The Unforgiven pay-per view of 2008 is arguably the most prominent showcase of this match type, as all three world titles were contested under a Championship Scramble match.

=== Elimination Chase ===
The Elimination Chase, first used in WWE's version of ECW brand in 2007, is a series of multi-competitor, one fall matches, with the loser of the fall being eliminated from future matches until one competitor remains.

=== Iron Survivor Challenge ===
WWE's NXT brand features a match called the Iron Survivor Challenge at its annual December event Deadline, in which none of the wrestlers are eliminated. There is one each for the men and women. The rules are as follows:

- Five wrestlers compete in the match, which lasts 25 minutes.
- Two wrestlers start the match, which begins the timer, and every five minutes, another wrestler enters with the fifth and final participant entering at the 15-minute mark.
- Each time a wrestler scores a pinfall, submission, or being the victim of a disqualification, they gain a point. Points can be gained even before other participants have entered.
- A wrestler who is pinned, submitted, or is disqualified goes into a penalty box for 90 seconds, after which they can re-enter the match.
- The winner of the match, dubbed the Iron Survivor, is the wrestler who scores the most points at the end of the 25-minute time limit. In the result of a tie, those who are tied enter sudden death overtime.
- The winners of the men's and women's matches earn a future match for the NXT Championship and NXT Women's Championship, respectively.

The Iron Survivor Challenge combines elements of the Championship Scramble, Iron Man, and TNA Wrestling's King of the Mountain matches. It was used for the first time at Deadline in 2022.

=== Special Guest Referee ===
The Special Guest Referee is any match in which the usual referee is replaced with a "guest" filling in as the official. Celebrities (such as Muhammad Ali in the main event of WrestleMania I), managers and other wrestlers can "guest" as the special referee. In some cases, a special referee is put into a match which is already a different match type or stipulation. The special referee will often be biased towards or against one of the competitors or will be assigned as the Special Referee to ensure the match is called down the line. Special Outside Referee also known as Special Enforcer or Special Guest Enforcer is same as the Special Referee but the guest referee stays on the outside enforcing what the normal referee doesn't see. These guests are sometimes known as "enforcers", the most famous of which was Mike Tyson, who served as the Special Guest Enforcer for the WWF title match between "Stone Cold" Steve Austin and Shawn Michaels at WrestleMania XIV, and Chuck Norris who served as Special Guest Enforcer at Survivor Series 1994 in a match between The Undertaker and Yokozuna. Another example of this is Triple H vs. The Undertaker in a Hell in a Cell match at WrestleMania 28 with Shawn Michaels being the Special Guest Referee.

=== Tomoesen ===
A tomoesen (Japanese: 巴戦; sometimes translated as "dogfight") is a sumo wrestling playoff that occurs when three wrestlers are tied for first place at the end of a tournament. Two wrestlers compete until a winner is determined. Then, the remaining wrestler faces off against the winner. This process continues until one wrestler wins two consecutive bouts and is declared the champion. Notable examples of this format being adapted to professional wrestling include Masahiro Chono defeating Riki Choshu and Hiroyoshi Tenzan at New Japan Pro-Wrestling's Toukon Festival: Wrestling World 2005 on January 4, 2005, as well as Jake Lee's victory over Kento Miyahara and Yuma Aoyagi to claim the vacant Triple Crown Heavyweight Championship at All Japan Pro Wrestling's 2021 Champions Night on June 26, 2021.

== Rumble rules-based variations ==
In this version – unlike traditional battle royales where all the wrestlers begin the match in the ring – the competitors (after numbers 1 and 2 begin the match) enter at timed intervals in accordance with the number that they have drawn until the entire field has entered.

=== Aztec Warfare ===
Aztec Warfare is the Lucha Underground version of the "Rumble Rules" battle royale. Upwards to 20 participants enter every 90 seconds and elimination occurs by either pinfall or submission and has to take place inside the ring. There are no count-outs and no disqualifications. As of April 2019, four Aztec Warfare matches have occurred—one in each season of Lucha Underground.

=== Battle Riot ===
The Battle Riot is Major League Wrestling's "Rumble" style battle royale. This match isn't that much different from other Pin, Submission & Over the top rope elimination rumble rules, however is different from the WWE Royal Rumble, of which you can only get eliminated via going over the top rope with both feet hitting the floor.

=== Casino Battle Royale ===
The Casino Battle Royale is used by All Elite Wrestling (AEW). It is a modified rumble rules battle royale that features 21 entrants. It begins with a group of five wrestlers, and every three minutes, another group of five wrestlers enter, while the 21st and final entrant enters alone. The wrestlers are grouped based on the suit they drew from a deck of cards – spades, diamonds, clubs, or hearts – and the order of when each group enters is based on a random draw of the cards. The 21st and final entrant is the wrestler who drew the joker. The winner receives a world championship match of their respective gender's division—either the AEW World Championship or the AEW Women's World Championship.

The first Casino Battle Royale occurred during the pre-show of AEW's inaugural event, Double or Nothing in 2019, and was a men's match. The winner of the inaugural match was entered into the match to determine the inaugural AEW World Champion at All Out that year. The second Casino Battle Royale was an all-female version and was held during the pre-show of the aforementioned All Out event. Like the first, the winner of this second iteration was entered into the match to determine the inaugural AEW Women's World Champion on the debut episode of AEW's weekly television show, Dynamite. The third Casino Battle Royale—a men's match—took place at All Out in 2020 and the winner received a future AEW World Championship match.

=== Honor Rumble ===
Ring of Honor (ROH) also periodically features the "Rumble" style of battle royale on their shows, billing it as the Honor Rumble. This battle royal differs from a standard version of the match in that the contestants do not all begin in the ring at the same time, but instead enter the match at timed intervals in order of their assigned entry numbers (comparable in style to WWE's Royal Rumble match). Numbers are usually drawn through a lottery that is typically staged right before the event begins, although participants can also win desirable spots via a number of other means, the most common being winning a match.

=== New Japan Rumble ===
New Japan Pro-Wrestling's annual "Rumble" battle royale, takes place on the pre-show of Wrestle Kingdom on January 4. Participants enter at one minute intervals and are eliminated via pinfall, submission or by being thrown over the top rope. Typically leaning towards light comedy, the match includes past stars as surprise entrants.

=== Royal Rampage ===
Used by All Elite Wrestling (AEW) on its program Rampage. The Royal Rampage is a two ring rumble rules battle royale. It features 20 wrestlers between the two rings (10 in each). It begins with two wrestlers in each ring, with two new wrestlers entering at timed intervals - one in the red ring and one in the blue ring (as differentiated by the color of the ropes). After all 20 wrestlers have entered, and once the field narrows to the last four participants, they will then consolidate into a single ring and fight until there is a winner, who then receives a championship match at a later date.

=== Royal Rumble ===
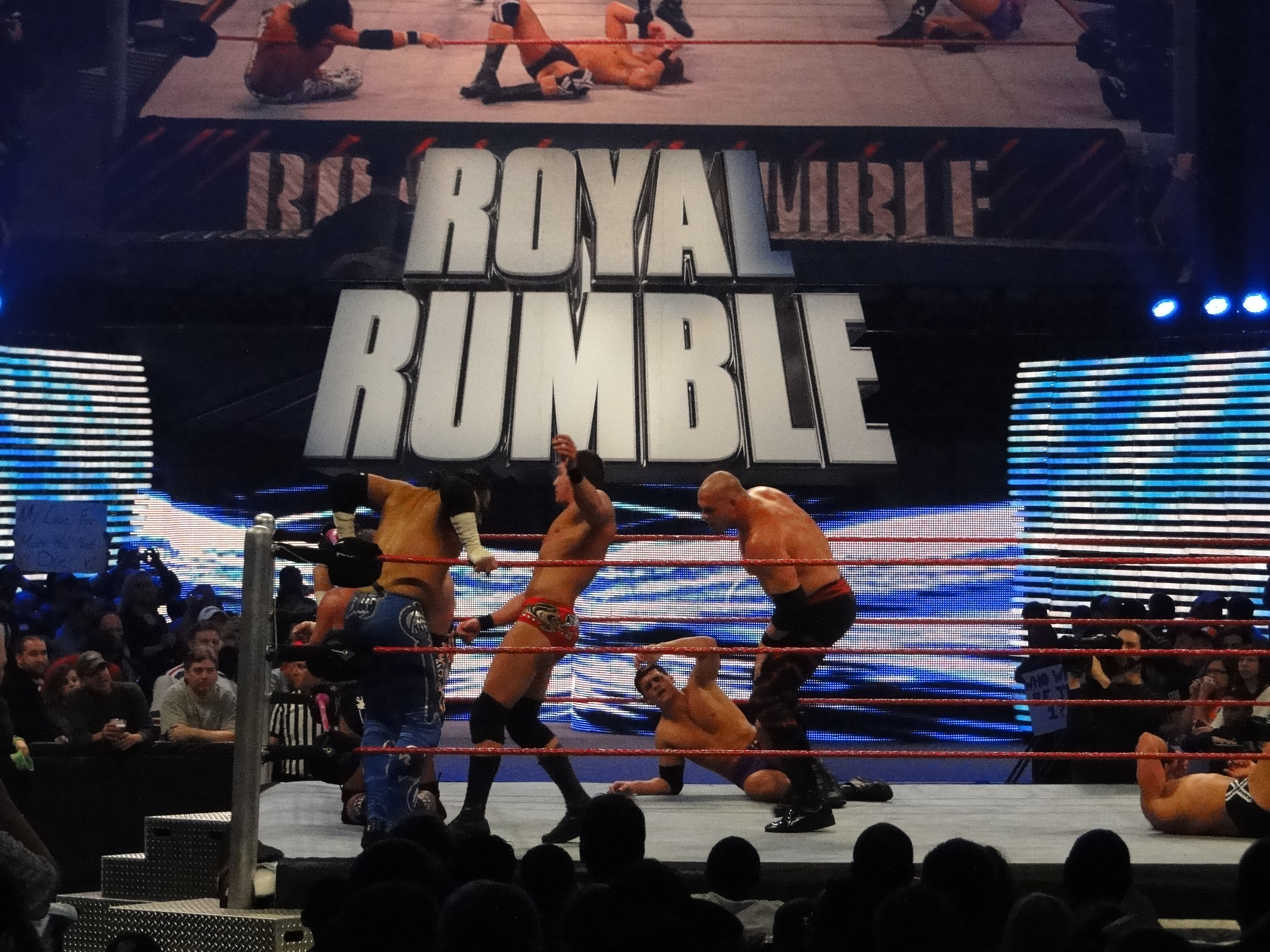
2010 Royal Rumble match

WWE's Royal Rumble is the original battle royale to use this format. It begins with two wrestlers in the ring, with the remaining participants introduced one by one at a set time period, usually 90 seconds or two minutes. Elimination occurs in the normal way with the last person standing as the winner, after all participants (traditionally 30 or 40 in Royal Rumble 2011 and 20 in Royal Rumble 1988) have entered the ring eliminated by being thrown over the top rope and having both feet touch the venue floor. (referred to as the "Shawn Michaels rule" in Royal Rumble 1995 in which he was thrown over the top rope, hung on to the top rope and only had one foot land on the floor). There is both a men's and women's Royal Rumble match, although WWE's first official women's Royal Rumble match debuted in 2018 used the same rules as the men's version, with the winners getting a world championship match (in their respective divisions) at that year's WrestleMania, which is WWE's biggest annual show. At the Greatest Royal Rumble in 2018, 50 participants entered the match. Stone Cold Steve Austin is the only 3-time Royal Rumble winner.

=== Royal Sambo ===
Dragon Gate's version takes place exclusively at touring shows at the Kobe Sambo Hall venue, as the promotion's home location is Kobe, Japan. Royal Sambo matches typically consist of 10-16 participants entering two at a time at 60 second intervals, with both wrestlers' entrance themes crossfading back and forth over the speakers. If an odd number of wrestlers are booked in the match, the final participant enters solo. Participants can be eliminated via over-the-top rope elimination, pinfall, or submission, and multiple wrestlers may pin or submit someone simultaneously. Typically booked as a comedy match, or with one high-profile wrestler as the obvious winner among others with much lower status on the roster.

=== Square Go! ===
Square Go! is Insane Championship Wrestling's (ICW) very own hybrid of WWE's Royal Rumble and Money in the Bank matches, and named for the Glaswegian term for a street fight. The competitors will compete in a 30-man over-the-top-rope "rumble rules" battle royale, the Square Go!, with the winner earning the Square Go Briefcase. It has mostly the same rules apply as Royal Rumble, two competitors who draw the numbers 1 and 2. The remaining participants which will enter the ring one-by-one at every two-minute intervals.

Five people have drawn entry numbers that allow them to carry a weapon of their choice into the ring. Participants were eliminated when thrown over the top ropes with both feet landing on the floor. The winner will win a briefcase that will entitle him to a match for the ICW World Championship at any time and anywhere of their choosing for one year (similar to Money in the Bank).

== Series-based variations ==
Series matches may involve the same match throughout, or may use different matches for some or all of the series. The most common form of a series match is extending the one-fall concept to a series of falls.

=== Gauntlet match ===
A Gauntlet match, also referred to as a Turmoil match, is a quick series of one-fall one-on-one matches. Two wrestlers begin the match and are replaced whenever one is eliminated (by pinfall or submission). After a predetermined number of wrestlers have competed in the match, the last person standing is named the winner. A Gauntlet match may also be played out in multiple "parts" as part of a storyline (in which a face wrestler must face a series of a heel wrestler's underlings before facing the heel himself, for instance) this was common in World Championship Wrestling in the early 1990s. A participant involved in a Gauntlet match may be said to be "running the gauntlet" but in most cases this designation being reserved for those who are involved for most of the match. Sometimes, it could also be (one-on-three) or (one-on-four) handicap match. Unlike tag matches, the three/four-man team will challenge the person handicapped individually until he is knocked out, at which time the match is over.

One example of this was on September 23, 1999, edition of WWE SmackDown where Triple H, being punished by Vince McMahon for his actions against him and his family, was booked in five gimmick matches in one night: a Chokeslam Challenge match (a match where the first to Chokeslam their opponent wins) against The Big Show, a Handicap Casket match against Viscera and Mideon, an Inferno match against Kane, a Boiler Room Brawl against Mankind, and a Brahma Bullrope match against The Rock.

==== Gauntlet Eliminator ====
The Gauntlet Eliminator is a modified gauntlet match in which two wrestlers start in the ring and every four minutes, another wrestler enters until all the entire field has entered. Eliminations can occur only by pinfall or submission. The last wrestler remaining wins. An example of this match was on the first night of 2021's NXT TakeOver: Stand & Deliver between Leon Ruff, Isaiah "Swerve" Scott, Bronson Reed, Dexter Lumis and L. A. Knight.

==== Casino Gauntlet ====
The Casino Gauntlet match is a modified version of the Gauntlet Eliminator promoted by All Elite Wrestling (AEW). Two wrestlers begin the match, with new entrants coming in at randomly timed intervals, with a maximum number of 21 entrants. It is a one fall match that can end at any time via pinfall or submission inside the ring, even before the entire field has entered. The prize for winning the Casino Gauntlet is a championship match at a later date.

==== Gauntlet for the Gold ====
TNA Wrestling uses the "Gauntlet for the Gold" format, which is named similarly to the Gauntlet match but is actually very different. The wrestlers enter at regular intervals, and elimination occurs when thrown over the top rope with both feet hitting the floor (as in a Royal Rumble match). This continues until only two wrestlers remain, after which the final winner is decided by pinfall or submission. This match type was first featured on the first ever NWA-TNA PPV, with Ken Shamrock defeating Malice in the final two.

=== Iron Man/Woman match ===
An Iron Man (or Iron Woman for female matches) match is a multiple-fall match with a set time limit (usually 30 or 60 minutes). The match is won by the wrestler who wins the most falls within the time limit by either pinfall, submission, disqualification, or countout. If there is ever a tie, the match goes to sudden death overtime in which the wrestler who scores one fall on their opponent will immediately be declared the winner. An example of an Iron Man Match is Dolph Ziggler vs. Seth Rollins at 2018 Extreme Rules for the Intercontinental Championship. Other examples are MJF vs. Bryan Danielson at AEW Revolution in 2023 for the AEW World Championship, and Bret Hart vs. Shawn Michaels at WrestleMania XII for the WWE Championship. The first Iron Woman match was between Team JWP (Cutie Suzuki, Dynamite Kansai, Hikari Fukuoka and Mayumi Ozaki) and Team AJW (Aja Kong, Kyoko Inoue, Sakie Hasegawa and Takako Inoue) at Thunder Queen Battle in Yokohama in 1993.

==== Anything Goes Iron Man match ====
An Anything Goes Iron Man match is the hardcore variation of an Iron Man match: there are no disqualifications, no countouts and falls count anywhere. John Cena faced Randy Orton in an Anything Goes Iron Man match at Bragging Rights 2009 for 60 minutes.

==== Total Count match ====
The Total Count match is a variation of an Iron Man match where the winner is not decided by the number of falls scored, but by the cumulative seconds of pinfalls counted by the referee (a one-count pinfall scores one point, a two-count pinfall scores two points, etc.). Depending on the specific rules of each match, the match can be won by the wrestler who has the largest score at the end of the allotted time, or by the first to reach a certain score. This stipulation has been used in DDT Pro-Wrestling. Shiori Asahi and Akito had a Total Count match for the DDT Extreme Championship at Judgement 2015 for 10 minutes plus one minute and 32 seconds of tie-breaking overtime; Shunma Katsumata and Mao had a hardcore version of the match billed as a "Kids Room Deathmatch 37 (Sauna) Count Edition" at Into The Fight 2021, in which the goal was to reach a score of 37.

==== Ultimate Submission match ====
An Ultimate Submission match is a variation of an Iron Man match where the only way to score a fall within the allotted time limit is to make your opponent submit. Chris Benoit and Kurt Angle had an Ultimate Submission match at Backlash 2001 for 30 minutes plus one minute and 33 seconds of tie-breaking overtime.

=== Two out of Three falls match ===
In a Two out of Three falls match, a wrestler or tag team must beat their opponent(s) twice to win. This can be achieved by pinfall, submission, disqualification or count-out. Examples of this match type include the 2012 Extreme Rules match between Daniel Bryan and Sheamus, as well as the 2000 SummerSlam match between Chris Benoit and Chris Jericho. A tag team version of this match occurred at the 2015 Payback pay-per-view event between The New Day and Cesaro & Tyson Kidd for the WWE Raw Tag Team Championship.

This stipulation is considered the norm in lucha libre.

==== Gate of Heaven match ====
A Gate of Heaven match is a multiple-fall match that is applied to tag team matches. Started in Dragon Gate, with the first match being a strict tag team match with two referees to make sure tags actually happen. The second match being the Dragon Gate rules. The third match, if necessary; tables, ladders and chairs are now legal. The first team to gain two victories before the other is the winner.

==== Three Stages of Hell match ====
A Three Stages of Hell match is a multiple-fall match in which two wrestlers must wrestle three special types of matches. A wrestler must achieve two victories before the other. There have only been seven occasions in which this match has been contested in WWE history. The first Three Stages of Hell match occurred in 2001 between Triple H and Steve Austin at 2001 No Way Out, which Triple H won 2–1. Another match of this type took place at 2002 Armageddon between Shawn Michaels and Triple H for the World Heavyweight Championship. The most recent example was on the January 9, 2026 edition of SmackDown, between Drew McIntyre and Cody Rhodes for the Undisputed WWE Championship.

==== Three Degrees of Pain match ====
The Three Degrees of Pain match is a hybrid match, a variation of Two out of Three Falls and Steel Cage match types where a wrestler must achieve a victory in the specific order before the other. The first victory is a pinfall, the second victory is a submission and if necessary, the third victory is to escape from the steel cage. There have only been two of these matches occurred in TNA history and both were feud-enders.

==== Three Strikes match ====
AEW's Three Strikes match features different stipulations for each fall, pinfall followed by submission followed by knockout. In the only occurrence of this match, Diamante faced Big Swole in a Three Strikes match on AEW Dark on September 7, 2021.

=== Clockwork Carnage match ===
A Clockwork Carnage match is a hybrid of the Iron Man match and the Gauntlet match types. Here, two wrestlers selected at random start the match. Every three minutes, another randomly selected wrestler enters. Until all competitors have entered, any wrestler who is pinned or submitted is eliminated. Once the final wrestler enters, all remaining wrestlers enter a 15-minute scoring phase. During that period, every pinfall or submission scores one fall. When time expires, the wrestler with the most falls wins. An example of this match is Will Ospreay defending the AEW World Championship against Samoa Joe, Adam Copeland, Kazuchika Okada, Ricochet, Darby Allin, Konosuke Takeshita, and "Speedball" Mike Bailey at WrestleDream in 2026.

=== Best of Series match ===
A "Best of Series" match is similar to a two out of three falls match but an extended series to five or seven; Even though it takes place over several nights to continue a feud rather than settle it in one night.

One variation is a Best of Five Series where a wrestler must win three matches to win the series. John Cena defeated Booker T 3–2 to win the WWE United States Championship at No Mercy (2004).

The Best of Seven Series is another variation, where a wrestler must win four matches to win the series. Chris Benoit and Booker T fought in such a series to determine the #1 contender for the WCW World Television Championship in 1998. The two resumed their Best of Seven series in 2006 for the WWE United States Championship. Sheamus and Cesaro ended in a 3–3 draw when their seventh match at Clash of Champions (2016) ended in a no-contest. Death Triangle (Pac, Penta El Zero Miedo, and Rey Fénix) wrestled The Elite (Kenny Omega and The Young Bucks (Matt Jackson and Nick Jackson)) in a series for the AEW World Trios Championship in 2022.

== Stipulation-based variations ==
As professional wrestling seeks to also tell a story, some matches are made solely for the purposes of advancing the plot. This typically involves the loser of a match being penalized in some way.

=== Clock Strikes Midnight match ===
The Clock Strikes Midnight match is a singles match where a match is contested under different stipulations, and stipulations of the match keep changing after random intervals. This match was contested between Alexxis Falcon and Nina Samuels at the 2023 Super Strong Style 16. The stipulations changed from time to time from a singles match to different stipulations such as Tables match, First Blood match, Submission match, Last Man Standing match, and Deathmatch.

=== Crybaby match ===
A Crybaby match is a singles match with the exception that the loser would have to dress as a baby by wearing a nappy and sucking from a bottle. This match only occurred once between 1-2-3 Kid and Razor Ramon at the In Your House 6 pay-per-view.

=== Jailhouse match ===
A Jailhouse match is a singles match with the exception that the loser would have to spend the night in a New York City jail cell. This match featured heavy brawling by both competitors The Mountie and Big Boss Man at SummerSlam 1991. At one point the Mountie tried to use his cattle prod, but missed. Bossman got the pin following a double leg slam and NYC police officers came down to handcuff the Mountie and take him to jail.

A variant of this match, entitled "Jailhouse Street Fight" is a hardcore match where the winner throws an opponent into a cage. This concept was introduced at NXT Roadblock 2023 where Tony D'Angelo defeated Dijak.

=== Kiss My Foot match ===
A Kiss My Foot match is a singles match with the exception that the loser must kiss the winner's bare foot. Such matches included Bret Hart vs. Jerry Lawler during the 1995 King of the Ring, Jerry Lawler vs. Michael Cole during the 2011 Over the Limit pay-per-view. A version of this match was used as a No Holds Barred kiss my foot match at Major League Wrestling's 2023 Fury Road event between Matt Cardona and Mance Warner.

==== Kiss My Ass match ====
A Kiss My Ass match is a singles match in which the loser has to kiss the winner's bare buttocks, in front of the crowd; it became prominent during WWE's Attitude Era. A notable example is The Rock vs. Billy Gunn at SummerSlam 1999, which The Rock won. The match type made a reappearance for Sheamus vs. Dolph Ziggler at Extreme Rules 2015, where it was branded a Kiss Me Arse match in reference to Sheamus' Irish accent. Ziggler won, but Sheamus attacked him and forced Ziggler's unconscious self to kiss Sheamus' behind.

=== Last Chance match ===
A last chance match, also called a do or die match, is a championship match where, if the challenger does not win the title, they are banned from challenging for it again as long as the winner of the same match holds it. Rarely, the loser may even be barred from challenging for that title for as long as he remains employed at the company, or in some cases never be able to challenge for the title under any circumstance. For example, at Slammiversary XI's main event, Sting was defeated by defending champion Bully Ray in a No Holds Barred variant of this match; as per the pre-match stipulation, he was barred from challenging for the TNA World Heavyweight Championship ever again no matter who holds it. Two similar situations would occur in All Elite Wrestling: at the 2019 Full Gear event, Cody Rhodes lost to AEW World Champion Chris Jericho, and as a result, could never challenge for the title again as long as he was employed by AEW; years later, in the leadup to the 2026 Revolution event, "Hangman" Adam Page invoked a stipulation for his AEW World Championship match against MJF at the event where, similarly to Sting's Slammiversary XI match, he would never challenge for the title ever again if he lost; he, like Sting, would also go on to lose the match, thus barring him from ever challenging for the title again. Later in the year, MJF applied the same stipulation to Kenny Omega for their AEW World Championship match at Beach Break 2026, which unlike the other aforementioned matches, Omega won. Tyson Kidd lost a last chance match against Adrian Neville for the NXT Championship in 2014. As a result, Tyson Kidd would never get another chance at the NXT Championship as long as he remained employed with WWE.

These matches are usually a way to finish a feud between the champion and a certain challenger. It can also be used as a way of keeping the same challenger a title feud with a multiple champions; someone who had previously lost a last chance match may issue a challenge to a new champion as soon as the previous champion - who won a last chance match - loses their title. An example of this would be Drew McIntyre, who lost a last chance match for Bobby Lashley's WWE Championship but immediately challenged new champion Big E when the latter won the belt from Lashley. A ban may also not be lifted in some other way, such as when Sting was able to challenge Magnus for the TNA World Heavyweight Championship in a No Disqualification Title vs. Career match at Genesis (2014), though Sting lost.

AEW introduced a variation on the Last Chance match called a "Championship" Eliminator. In this variation, if the challenger defeats or draws against the champion, they get a future match for the title, but if they lose, then they can no longer challenge that champion for as long as the champion holds the title.

=== Loser Leaves Town match ===
"Loser leaves town" is a generic term for any match in which the loser has to leave the current promotion or sub-division. These matches were most often held during the "territorial days", when wrestlers frequently jumped from company to company and has been used in the independent circuit on an occasional basis. It has been held with greater frequency in WWE during the brand split; the losing wrestler typically leaves the brand (usually either Raw or SmackDown), only to go to the other brand. It is also used as a way to write a wrestler off TV to give them some time off.

=== Loser Wears A Chicken Suit match ===
Loser Wears a Chicken Suit match is a singles match where the loser must wear a chicken suit either following the match or at another event soon after. Col. Robert Parker had to wear a chicken suit on the January 29, 1994 episode of WCW Saturday Night following his loss to Flyin' Brian Pillman at Clash of the Champions XXVI.

=== Loser Wears Dress match ===
Loser Wears Dress match is a singles match where the loser must wear a woman's dress temporarily after the match occurred. The match is won by pinfall or submission. An example of this type of match is at Souled Out (1999) between Chris Jericho and Perry Saturn which Jericho won.

=== Luchas de Apuestas ===
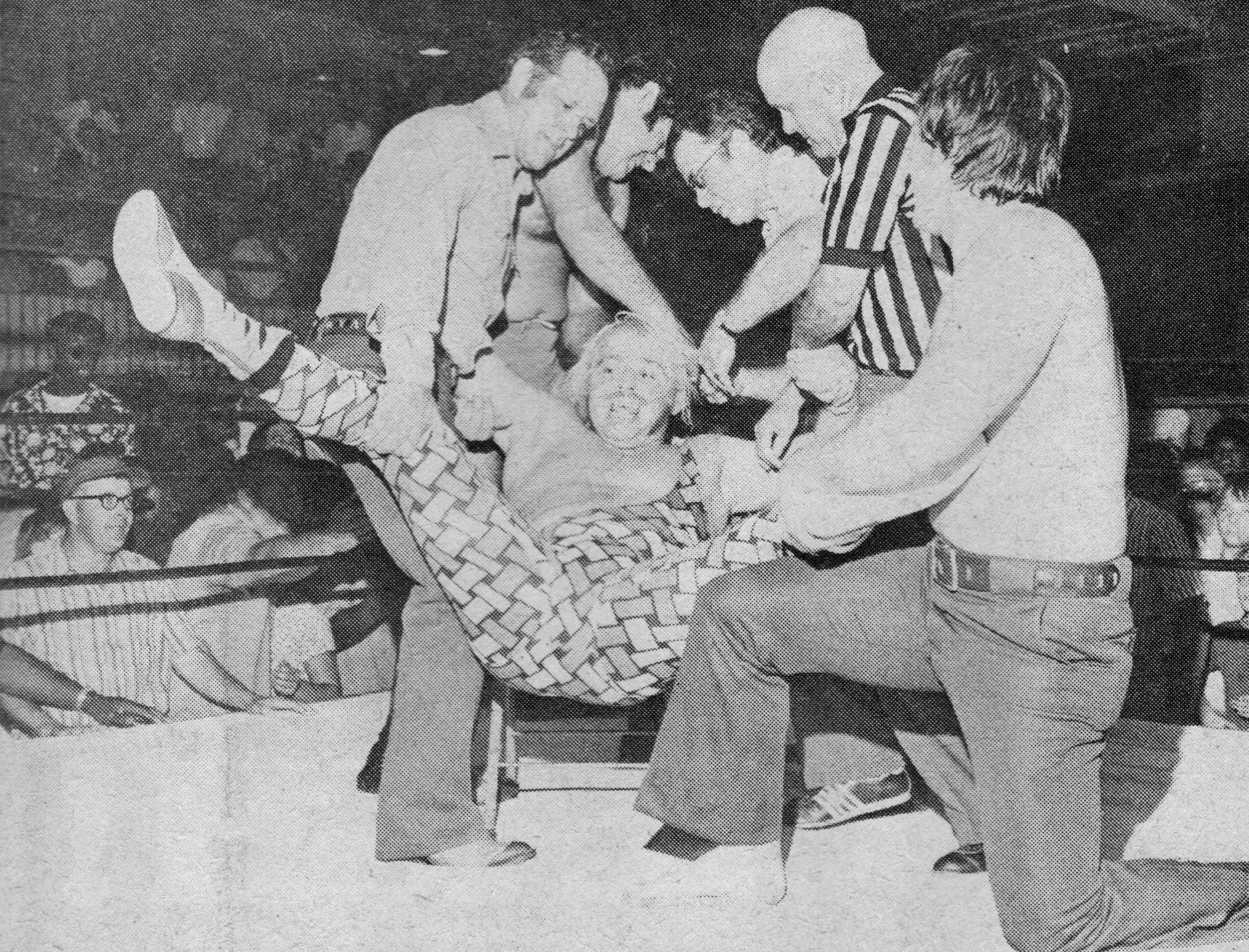
Bobby Shane is restrained inside the ring by several fellow wrestlers and the referee while his head is shaved, following his loss in a hair match.

Luchas de apuestas (in English meaning "gambling fights") are matches in which both wrestlers wager something specific (the mask or hair) on the outcome. The loser of the match then loses the item, being forced to take off their mask or be shaved bald. It is also possible for a wrestler to put someone else's item on the line, with the same stipulation applying in the event of a loss. These matches have a storied history in Mexico. Upon unmasking, it is not unheard of for a wrestler's real name and information to be published. As a form of further humiliation, the loser can be forced to physically hand the mask they just lost to the winner.

The most popular types of wager are the mask of a masked wrestler or the hair of a non-masked wrestler, most commonly put against each other in mask vs. mask (in Spanish: máscara contra máscara), mask vs. hair (máscara contra cabellera), or hair vs. hair (cabellera contra cabellera) matches. Throughout Mexico, when masked wrestlers lose their masks, they are not allowed to compete under a mask with that same gimmick. In addition to masks and hair, championships, or careers — as a form of retirement match — can be put up as the wager in any combination.

Can be combined with other stipulation types, like reversed torneo cibernetico matches, cage matches (see Infierno en el Ring), or multiple gimmicks at once.

==== Bounty match ====
Similarly the mask can be used in a bounty match, which can be a single match or series of matches where a third party will reward whoever can unmask the targeted competitor. The match can also be used to defeat a targeted individual or take them out of action with a reward. Sometimes the reward is disclosed and sometimes not. An example of the mask bounty match was Flyin' Brian Pillman having a bounty by Barry Windham after making appearances as The Yellow Dog in order to continue wrestling after losing a loser leaves match.

=== Move match ===
The Move match has the objective of performing a specific move first. Usually a signature move or finisher of the wrestlers is selected, although on occasion it will be a generic move that is notoriously hard to perform on both wrestlers. The match usually takes the name of the target move if both wrestlers are trying to perform their finisher for the win. The best known of these was Yokozuna's Bodyslam Challenge, which Lex Luger won. Another famous move match was the $15,000 Body Slam Challenge between Andre The Giant and Big John Studd at the first WrestleMania. Another move match was the Masterlock Challenge which was created by Chris Masters. A Chokeslam Challenge match was also done between The Big Show and Triple H on WWE Smackdown in September 1999. A Stink Face Challenge match is another move match where whoever delivers the Stink Face to their opponent first wins.

==== Banned Move match ====
The Banned Move match is a singles match when one or both of the competitors is not allowed to use their finishing move or else they will be disqualified. One of the competitors cannot be disqualified if that wrestler uses the move to give an unfair disadvantage. Sometimes this stipulation is used in a feud with wrestlers whose finishers are the same or similar, in these cases it is common to see the stipulation added that the losing wrestler is no longer allowed to use that move anymore. This type of match often forces the banned wrestler to get more creative and use moves they don't normally use in an attempt to win. An example of this match took place at Extreme Rules in 2015 between Seth Rollins and Randy Orton, where, in addition to the match taking place in a Steel Cage, Orton's finisher, the RKO, was banned. Another example was at the 2020 edition of AEW's All Out event, where AEW Champion Jon Moxley defended his title successfully against MJF. In that match, Moxley's finisher, the Paradigm Shift (a variation of a DDT), was banned, although he did use it when the referee had his back turned.

=== Retirement match ===
Also referred to as a "career ending match". The retirement stipulation can be applied to just one wrestler or both wrestlers in a match can be wrestling for their careers (though in practice some wrestlers may resume their career later either inside or outside the promotion the match occurs in despite being "retired" per the stipulation of the match).

Some examples of this stipulation of match are Randy Savage vs. Ultimate Warrior at WrestleMania VII, Shawn Michaels vs. Ric Flair at WrestleMania XXIV, Shawn Michaels vs. The Undertaker at WrestleMania XXVI, Saya Kamitani vs. Tam Nakano at Stardom All Star Grand Queendom 2025, and AJ Styles vs. Gunther at the 2026 Royal Rumble. More loosely, the term can refer to the last match of a (usually "legendary") wrestler's career. Such a match is designed to be a last hurrah, showcasing the wrestler's talent one last time for their fans; examples of this type include Ric Flair's Last Match in 2022, Sting's retirement match at AEW Revolution in 2024, and John Cena's retirement match at Saturday Night's Main Event XLII in 2025.

=== Spin the Wheel, Make the Deal ===
The Spin the Wheel, Make the Deal concept was introduced in WCW at the 1992 Halloween Havoc to determine the stipulation for the match pitting Sting versus Jake Roberts. While not a match type in and of itself, Spin the Wheel, Make the deal involves a wheel of fortune featuring a number of match types. When the wheel is spun, the stipulation it lands on is the one used for the match. The concept was later used in TNA as the "Wheel of Dixie" and in WWE as "Raw Roulette". Since 2020, WWE has revived Spin the Wheel, Make the Deal for Halloween Havoc, which was itself revived as an event for the NXT brand.

== Strip matches ==
In two kinds of matches, a wrestler does not win by pinfall or submission, but only by stripping their opponent of their clothing. Historically, these types of matches were contested between managers or valets, due to their supposed lack of wrestling ability. In the Attitude Era, however, full-time female wrestlers (known formerly as Divas in WWE) began engaging in strip matches for the purpose of titillation. A bra and panties match is usually contested by two or more female wrestlers where the only objective to win this match is to strip her opponent down to her bra and panties. An evening gown match is usually contested by two female competitors in evening gowns. The only objective to win this match is the wrestler must remove the evening gown from her opponent. A tuxedo match is usually contested by two male competitors in tuxedos. The only objective to win this match is the wrestler must remove his opponent's tuxedo.

== Submission match ==
A submission match is typically a variation of a singles match in which pinfalls, count-outs, and disqualifications are not legal and the match could only end by making an opponent tap out to a submission hold.

=== Throw in the Towel match ===
A Throw in the Towel match, also known as a No Surrender Rules match in Total Nonstop Action Wrestling, is a singles match where there are one or more cornermen for each participant, and victory is obtained when an opponent's cornerman throws a towel into the ring to signal surrender on behalf of their wrestler. An example of this type of match is between Bob Backlund with Owen Hart as his cornermen and Bret Hart with The British Bulldog as his cornermen at the 1994 Survivor Series.

=== Catch-as-Catch Can match ===
A Catch-as-Catch Can match is a singles match where any submission hold are allowed that is not intended to inflict injury, which contained mostly submission amateur-style wrestling. This match is altered to stipulate that a wrestler may lose by going to or being forced to the arena floor, like in a battle royale. An example of this type of match is the infamous match between Dean Malenko and Billy Kidman during WCW's Souled Out (2000), where Malenko lost in two minutes by forgetting the rules and escaping to the floor after a barrage of attacks from Kidman.

=== "I quit" match ===
An "I quit" match is a singles match where a wrestler must force the other wrestler to submit in the form of saying the words "I quit" into a microphone to win. This match is run under hardcore rules - no disqualifications, no countouts and the submission can happen anywhere. The referee follows the action with a microphone in hand during the event.

=== Submissions Count Anywhere match ===
The Submissions Count Anywhere match is a variation of a Submission and Falls Count Anywhere match, and debuted at Breaking Point 2009 between D-Generation X and The Legacy. This is a tag-team stipulation where a wrestler can be submitted anywhere to win, and there are no pinfalls, no disqualifications and no countouts. This match occurred only once in WWE history.

== Substance match ==
The match is contested in a large container filled with various substances, typically between two female individuals who may or may not have experience with wrestling. Substances can include anything from mud to chocolate milk. Sometimes, specialty substances are used for certain occasions like gravy for Thanksgiving and eggnog for Christmas.

A notable example of this match type was the Mimosa Mayhem match, which was contested between Chris Jericho and Orange Cassidy at All Elite Wrestling's All Out pay-per-view in September 2020, where the only ways to gain victory were by pinfall, submission or by knocking the opponent into a large vat of mimosa. Unlike the traditional reasoning, the theme fit with both parties' gimmicks: Jericho was promoting his own line of champagne, and Cassidy is billed as "Freshly Squeezed" as part of his gimmick (in the independent circuit Cassidy would often spit orange juice into his opponent's eyes).

Another example of this match was the Chocolate Pudding match when Candice Michelle defeated Melina in one of these matches.

=== Blood Bath match ===
A Blood Bath match is a no-disqualification match where the first to be covered in a vat of blood dispensed from a bucket loses. The Brood members Edge and Gangrel had a Blood Bath match on WWE Raw in August 1999.

=== Mud match ===
Perhaps the most notable substance match was a mud match, where wrestlers would wrestle in an area or container full of mud, usually away from the ring. Usually women would participate in these matches with some occasional male involvement.

==== Hog Pen match ====
A variation of a Mud Match is the Hog Pen match, which is a Mud Match held in a pig pen on a farm, often filled with mud and pig excrement. Hunter Hearst Helmsley and Henry O. Godwinn participated in a Hog Pen match at WWE's In Your House 5 in December 1995. The only objective to win is to be the first wrestler to throw his opponent into a pig pen.

== Team matches ==
Matches are often contested between two or more teams, most often consisting of two members each. Tag team matches can range from two teams of two fighting, to multiple man teams challenging each other.

=== Tag Team match ===
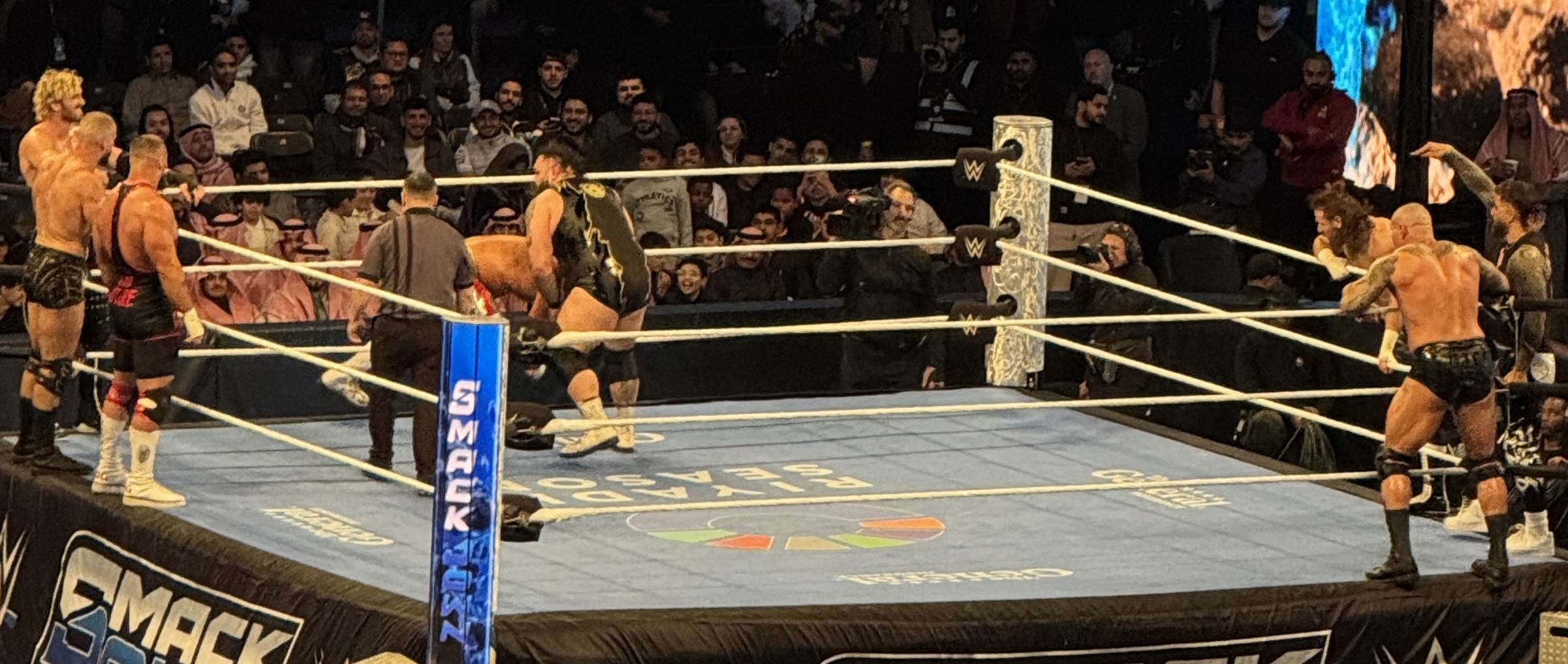
An 8-man tag team match in progress

On most occasions, one member of the team competes in the ring with one or more of his or her teammates standing behind the ropes. Wrestlers switch positions by "tagging" one another, usually similar to a high five and, as a result, these teams are referred to as tag teams. This can create tension during the match as an injured wrestler in the middle of the ring attempts to reach his or her teammates, often with the heel team preventing them from doing so. In typical tag team matches, standard wrestling rules apply with a match ending by pinfall, submission, countout, or disqualification. Tag team matches have also been seen in mixed martial arts and boxing.

Promotions usually have a tag team championship for a team of two wrestlers, and on rare occasion allies of the reigning tag team will be allowed to defend the title in the place of one of the reigning wrestlers under the Freebird rule. Though common in Mexican lucha libre, at one point, World Championship Wrestling (WCW) had a championship for teams of three. WWE also can have three (triple threat) or four (fatal four-way) tag teams going against each other as well. The Tag Team Triple Threat match (known as Tag Team Triangle match in WCW) involves three teams where a member of two teams are in the ring and can tag their partner or a member of the third team. The first team with an active competitor to win by pinfall or submission wins the match for the team.

The Tag Team Four Corners match (also known as Tag Team Fatal Four-Way match) is another variation that starts off with four teams positioned as in a tag team match and two wrestlers active in the ring. The two wrestlers in the ring can tag their partner or members of a team not already represented in the match. It is an advantage to have a team member tagged into the match as you can only win by being a legal competitor in the match and the one who scores the fall wins the match for the team. One example was a four team match for the WWE Women's Tag Team Championship at Starrcade (2019).

Another variation of the four-way tag team match is to have a member of each of the four teams in competition while their partners are on the apron and the active member who scores a pinfall or submission wins the match for the team. One example of this variation was contested for the SmackDown Tag Team Championship at Clash of Champions (2017).

Sometimes a team will have members of three, four or five in non-elimination tag matches. They are often named based on the number of participants and gender involved. Six-Man (Six-Woman) Tag Team match (known as Trios match in AEW) is one variation. The Wyatt Family defeated The Shield at Elimination Chamber (2014) in a six-man tag team match.

==== Tornado Tag Team match ====
The tornado tag team match (Originally known as the Texas Tornado) is a hardcore-rules match where all wrestlers involved are allowed to be in and wrestle in the ring and elsewhere at the same time, and thus all wrestlers are vulnerable to having a fall scored against them. Whether or not it is truly a tag team match is debatable, as it involves no tagging, but it is contested between tag teams. The first match of this kind was held on October 2, 1937, in Houston between Milo Steinborn and Whiskers Savage against Tiger Daula and Fazul Mohammed. It was the brainchild of promoter Morris Sigel. Another well-known example of this match is when The Shield (Roman Reigns & Seth Rollins) challenged Team Hell No (Daniel Bryan & Kane) for the WWE Tag Team Championship at Extreme Rules (2013).

=== Elimination Tag Team match ===
Tag team matches are occasionally held under elimination rules; that is, the losing wrestler is eliminated from the match, but their team is allowed to continue with their remaining members until all members of one team are eliminated. WWE and other promotions also has three or four tag teams going against each other as well. Anyone can be tagged in by anyone else and can be subject to immediate disqualification for failure to accept a tag. When a wrestler is pinned or force to submit, the entire team is eliminated and the last team remaining wins.

In WWE, these matches are primarily featured during its Survivor Series pay-per-views, where they are billed as a "Survivor Series match". Teams of four or five, though on some occasions as many as seven, compete under elimination rules. All other standard rules apply, and team members may tag in and out in any order. While some teams are already established stables, others may need to recruit members for their team. In lucha libre promotions, a torneo cibernetico is a similar type of match between teams of up to eight wrestlers who enter in a predetermined order.

==== Captain's Fall match ====
A captain's fall match is a tag team elimination match where the two teams of four competitors to compete and captains are assigned to both teams. The purpose of the match is to score a fall over the captain to get the win. Eliminations may occur until the captain is pinned or force to submit; the team loses if the captain is eliminated. Although common in Mexican promotions, as well as certain Japanese promotions to an extent, the only time this match type occurred in WWE was at the August 20, 2019, edition of WWE 205 Live, between Team Drew Gulak vs. Team Lorcan.

==== Tag Team Turmoil ====
A tag team turmoil is another version of an elimination tag team match. The match has a team in each of the four corners to start the match, but as each team is eliminated another team takes its place, similar to a gauntlet match. There are five pay-per-view matches of the tag team turmoil took place at SummerSlam in 1999, Armageddon in 2003, Night of Champions in 2010, Night of Champions Kickoff Show in 2013 and Elimination Chamber in 2017. Two teams start, when one is eliminated a new team comes to the ring until all teams have competed, the remaining team is the winner. This was used on the May 31, 2011 episode of NXT, with a team consisting of a WWE pro and an NXT rookie. The winning team earned three redemption points for the rookie in this version. This was also used on the May 8, 2017 episode of Raw, where the winning team earned a number one contender's spot for Matt and Jeff Hardy's WWE Raw Tag Team Championship.

==== Ultimate Endurance match ====
Primarily associated with Ring of Honor (ROH), An Ultimate Endurance match is a tag team elimination match that typically includes three to four tag teams with the members of two. The match starts off with a particular set of special stipulations, with the stipulation changing every time a team is eliminated. These stipulations are predetermined and are not limited to any specific type.

=== Mixed Tag Team match ===
A mixed tag team match features mixed-gender teams that only wrestlers of the same gender may be in the ring at the same time will wrestle each other under the standard rules. For example, if a female wrestler tags her male partner, both women leave the ring and both men enter the ring, the roles is also reversed as well. The Mixed Match Challenge tournament was debuted on January 16, 2018, which both team winners The Miz and Asuka won season one while R-Truth and Carmella won season two, earning themselves the #30 spots in the 2019 Royal Rumble matches and an all-expenses-paid vacation.

==== Intergender Tag Team match ====
An intergender tag team match features mixed-gender teams but it differs from the "Mixed Tag Team match" in which that both men and women can be in the ring at the same time to wrestle each other under the tornado tag team rules. This concept was used and popularized in the early 2000s by Team Xtreme during the Attitude Era.

=== Stadium Stampede / Anarchy in the Arena match ===
A Stadium Stampede match is a type of hybrid tag team, location and cinematic match that originated in All Elite Wrestling. It has been run twice at their Double or Nothing pay-per-view event under this name and four times under the Anarchy in the Arena name, as well as once at their 2023 All In pay-per-view event for a total of seven times (when conducted indoors, it is called an Anarchy in the Arena match). This match typically involves 10 wrestlers in a 5 vs 5 match, and all five wrestlers of the two teams are each part of an established faction in AEW. This often violent and brutal match is contested under hardcore rules, and it starts in a ring in the middle of the stadium or arena and progresses through various environments, such as bars, cargo loading areas and offices. The 2020 edition of this match stayed within the empty TIAA Bank Field and featured the teams brawling around the stadium, while the 2021 edition of this match had the combatants exit the empty stadium and then finally end up in the audience-present central event space at the adjacent Daily's Place outdoor amphitheatre, where the match was finished in the Daily's Place ring. The first indoor edition took place under the name Anarchy in the Arena at Double or Nothing 2022. The third match under the Stadium Stampede name was held at All In inside London's Wembley Stadium in 2023. However, unlike the previous stadium editions, the entire match took place live in front of a crowd, instead of it being a cinematic match.

==== List of Stadium Stampede matches ====
| # | Match | Event | Date | Venue | Location |
|---|---|---|---|---|---|
| 1 | The Elite (Kenny Omega, "Hangman" Adam Page and The Young Bucks (Matt Jackson and Nick Jackson)) and Matt Hardy vs. The Inner Circle (Chris Jericho, Jake Hager, Sammy Guevara, Santana and Ortiz) | Double or Nothing (2020) | May 23, 2020 | TIAA Bank Field | Jacksonville, Florida |
| 2 | The Inner Circle (Chris Jericho, Jake Hager, Sammy Guevara, Santana and Ortiz) vs. The Pinnacle (MJF, Wardlow, Shawn Spears, and FTR (Dax Harwood and Cash Wheeler)) | Double or Nothing (2021) | May 30, 2021 | TIAA Bank Field; Daily's Place | Jacksonville, Florida |
| 3 | Blackpool Combat Club (Jon Moxley, Claudio Castagnoli and Wheeler Yuta), Mike Santana and Ortiz vs. Eddie Kingston, Orange Cassidy, Penta El Zero Miedo and Best Friends (Trent Beretta and Chuck Taylor) | All In (2023) | August 27, 2023 | Wembley Stadium | London, England |
| 4 | Jericho, The Hurt Syndicate (Bobby Lashley and Shelton Benjamin), and The Elite (Kenny Omega, Jack Perry, and The Young Bucks (Matt Jackson and Nick Jackson)) vs. The Demand (Ricochet, Bishop Kaun, and Toa Liona), The Don Callis Family (Mark Davis and Andrade El Ídolo), and The Dogs (Clark Connors and David Finlay) | Double or Nothing (2026) | May 24, 2026 | Louis Armstrong Stadium | Queens, New York |

==== List of Anarchy in the Arena matches ====
| # | Match | Event | Date | Venue | Location |
|---|---|---|---|---|---|
| 1 | Blackpool Combat Club (Jon Moxley and Bryan Danielson), Eddie Kingston, Mike Santana and Ortiz vs. The Jericho Appreciation Society (Chris Jericho, Daniel Garcia, Jake Hager, Angelo Parker, and Matt Menard) | Double or Nothing (2022) | May 29, 2022 | T-Mobile Arena | Paradise, Nevada |
| 2 | Blackpool Combat Club (Jon Moxley, Bryan Danielson, Claudio Castagnoli and Wheeler Yuta) vs. The Elite (Kenny Omega, The Young Bucks (Matt Jackson and Nick Jackson) and "Hangman" Adam Page) | Double or Nothing (2023) | May 28, 2023 | T-Mobile Arena | Paradise, Nevada |
| 3 | The Elite (The Young Bucks (Matthew Jackson and Nicholas Jackson), Kazuchika Okada and Jack Perry) vs. Team AEW (Bryan Danielson, Darby Allin and FTR (Dax Harwood and Cash Wheeler)) | Double or Nothing (2024) | May 26, 2024 | MGM Grand Garden Arena | Paradise, Nevada |
| 4 | Kenny Omega, Swerve Strickland, Willow Nightingale and The Opps (Samoa Joe, Katsuyori Shibata and Powerhouse Hobbs) vs. Death Riders (Jon Moxley, Claudio Castagnoli, Marina Shafir and Wheeler Yuta) and The Young Bucks (Matthew Jackson and Nicholas Jackson) | Double or Nothing (2025) | May 25, 2025 | Desert Diamond Arena | Glendale, Arizona |
| 5 | Death Riders (Jon Moxley, Daniel Garcia, Gabe Kidd) and The Conglomeration (Kyle O'Reilly, Roderick Strong, and Orange Cassidy) vs. The Cut (Jay White, Austin Gunn, Colten Gunn, David Finlay, Clark Connors, Ace Austin) | Full Gear (2026) | November 14, 2026 | Mortgage Matchup Center | Phoenix, Arizona |

=== Strange Bedfellows match ===
A Strange Bedfellows match is a standard tag team match where a member of one tag team has to team up with a member of another tag team they are feuding with. One example of this was when Matt Hardy had to team up with Christian against his brother/tag team partner Jeff Hardy and Christian's tag team partner Edge.

== Weapon-based variations ==
Through the use of foreign objects, the matches generally take the name of the weapon being used ("Singapore cane match", "Chairs match"). In the following list of weapon-based matches, additional rules have supplanted or replaced the standard rules.

=== Arcade Anarchy match ===
An Arcade Anarchy match is a tag-team hardcore match that originated in AEW where various items found in arcades like air hockey tables, mallet hammers (for Mogura Taiji (Whac-a-Mole)), various video game stalls, a claw crane, and even Teddy bears filled with Lego bricks are made available and placed around the ring. There is also a "prize wall" made available with traditional hardcore professional wrestling weapons hanging on this wall. This match was first done on AEW Dynamite on March 31, 2021.

=== Beach Brawl ===
A Beach Brawl is a hardcore match where objects that are found at a beach, like surfboards, wooden benches, wooden tables, beach balls, sports balls and a kiddle pool filled with plastic balls are made available. The match is no-disqualification, so other weapons are also legal. The first Beach Brawl was between Sol Ruca and Blair Davenport in WWE NXT's Spring Breakin' in April 2024.

=== Bricks match ===
A Bricks match is a hardcore match where concrete bricks are made available as weapons. Bricks were often integrated into no-rope barbed wire deathmatches, and bricks first made their appearance in Japanese deathmatches in 1993.

=== Chairs match ===
A Chairs match is a standard weapons match with any number of steel chairs being the only legal weapon to be used. This match can be won by pinfall or submission. The first Chairs match was introduced at TLC 2009 between Batista vs. The Undertaker, which Undertaker won by pinfall.

=== Country Whipping match ===
A Country Whipping match is a hardcore match where all competitors are armed with leather belts, which is the only legal weapon in the match. This was known to be The Godwinns speciality match. Also called a Corporal Punishment match and a Badstreet deathmatch.

=== Crazy 8 match ===
The Crazy 8 match, used mostly in the defunct Pro Wrestling Unplugged promotion, involves placing a championship belt at the top of a scaffold with the first wrestler to retrieve it being declared the winner. Placed in and around the ring for the wrestlers to use during the match are one side of a steel cage, two trampolines, and four rope swings.

=== Doors match ===
A Doors match is a standard hardcore match with any number of wooden doors as the legal weapons to be used.

=== Fans Bring the Weapons match ===
A Fans Bring the Weapons match is a type of dangerous hardcore match where the competing wrestlers take random blunt objects from audience members and use them in the match. This match was first pioneered in Extreme Championship Wrestling in the mid-1990s.

=== Good Housekeeping match ===
A Good Housekeeping match is a hardcore match where various items usually found in private homes such as trashcans, kitchen sinks, ironing boards, pans, tables, brooms, utensils and various raw food ingredients are made available as weapons and these are the only legal weapons. This match is fought under no-disqualification and no-countout rules. Jeff Jarrett fought Chyna in a Good Housekeeping match at WWF's No Mercy 1999.

=== Handcuff match ===
A Handcuff match is a hardcore match when the only way to win is a wrestler must retrieve a pair of handcuffs then handcuff the opposing wrestler to a ring fixture, sometimes so that the opposing wrestler is unable to make use of their hands.

=== Hangman's Horror match ===
The Hangman's Horror match was created by Raven to end his feud with Vampiro w/James Mitchell at TNA's IMPACT Wrestling on October 29, 2003. The objective in this match is to wrap your opponent's neck with a steel chain and then proceed in hanging him over the ring ropes. Once he is declared unconscious by the referee, the person in charge of the horrific hanging will gain the victory.

=== Kendo Stick match ===
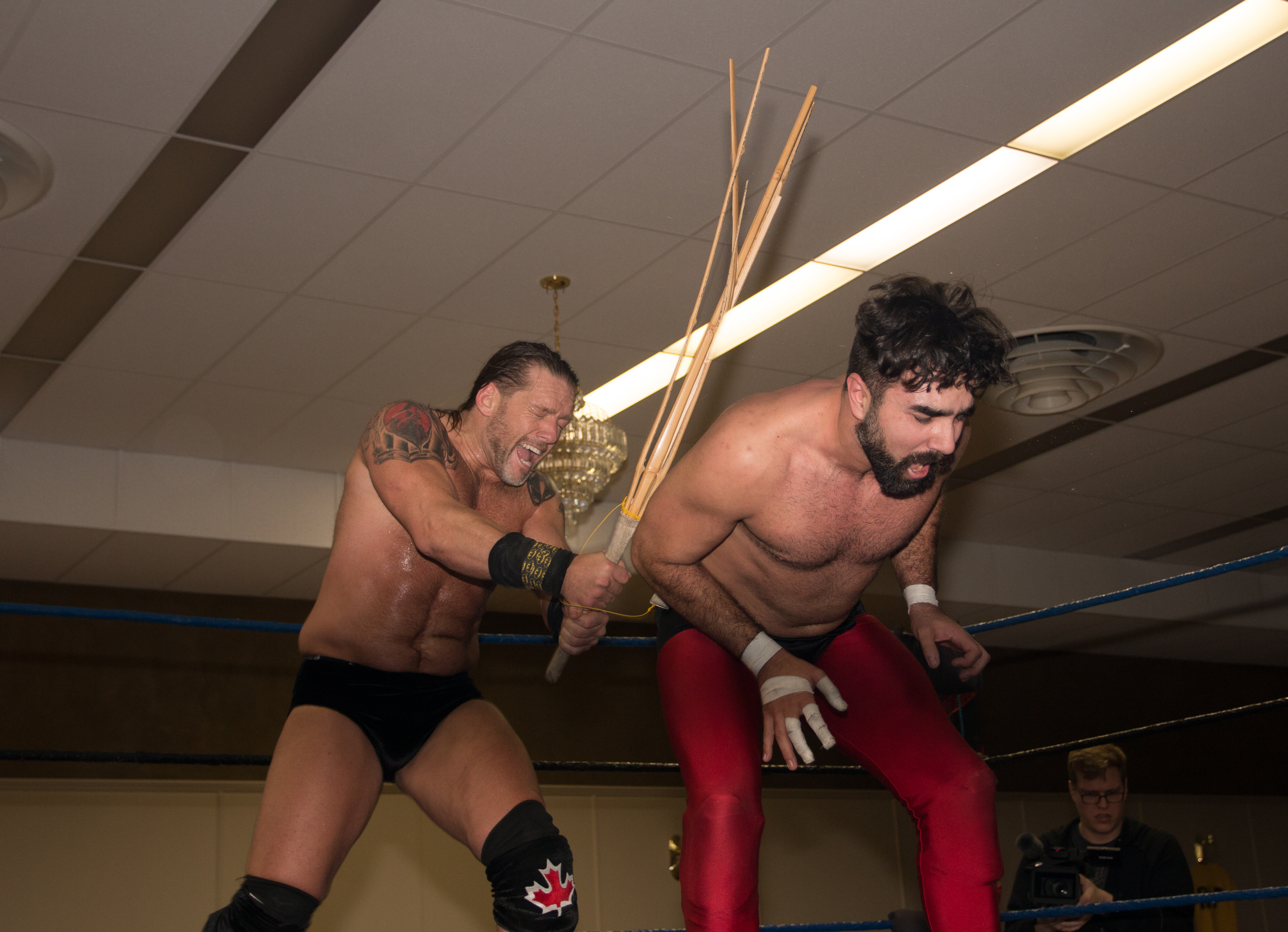
Johnny Devine (left) uses a kendo stick on Buck Gunderson during a match

A kendo stick match (also known as a Singapore cane match or Dueling canes match) is a standard weapons match with a kendo stick being the only legal weapon. Often, the ring will be lined with many kendo sticks for the wrestlers to use. Hardcore wrestling promotion Combat Zone Wrestling has used this match with fluorescent light tubes instead of kendo sticks.

=== Ladder match ===
A ladder match is a no-disqualification style match in which a specific object (usually a title belt, a contract or a briefcase) is placed above the ring—out of the reach of the competitors—with the winner being the first person to climb a ladder and retrieve it. This is often used in WWE with their Money in the Bank matches. The ladder may be used as a weapon.

==== Casino Ladder match ====
The Casino Ladder match was created by All Elite Wrestling as a variation of its Casino Battle Royale mixed with a traditional ladder match. A poker chip is hung above the ring beneath a ladder, which can be used as a weapon. The match starts with two wrestlers, with a new participant entering every 2 minutes. The first wrestler to grab the poker chip wins the match, and with it a future AEW World Championship match at a time and place of the wrestler's choosing. Notably, the match can be won before all of the intended participants have entered.

==== Full Metal Mayhem match ====
A Full Metal Mayhem match is a variation of a TLC match (see below), where in addition to tables and chairs being present, steel chains are also made available, and any other weapon that is metallic (trashcans, thumbtacks) often make appearances. This match originated in TNA/Impact Wrestling and this promotion has had at least one of these matches every year since 2005.

==== King of the Mountain match ====
The King of the Mountain match is described as a "reverse ladder match". Instead of retrieving an object hanging above the ring, the winner is the first person to use a ladder to hang a championship belt above the ring—after having scored a pinfall or submission (pinfalls count anywhere) to earn the right to try. A wrestler who has been pinned or forced to submit must spend two minutes in a penalty box. At Slammiversary (2022), the first-ever Queen of the Mountain match took place, with Jordynne Grace defeating champion Tasha Steelz, along with Chelsea Green, Deonna Purrazzo and Mia Yim to win the Impact Knockouts Championship. Four-time Knockouts World Champion Mickie James was the match's enforcer.

==== Stairway to Hell match ====
Used in ECW, a Stairway to Hell match is a ladder match with a weapon hanging over the ring. Rather than winning the match by retrieving it, the first wrestler to climb a ladder and retrieve the weapon is allowed to use it in the match. The match is won by standard pinfall or submission.

==== TLC match ====
A tables, ladders and chairs match, often abbreviated as TLC match, is an extension of a ladder match with chairs and tables also being present as legal weapons. This match was introduced because each of the three teams specialized in one of these weapons: Edge and Christian were known for their frequent use of steel folding chairs and the tandem "con-chair-to" move; the Dudley Boyz were known for their pioneering, hard-hitting use of slamming their opponents through wooden event tables; and the Hardy Boyz were known for their high-flying acrobatics off of twin-step ladders. There had been a similar type of match at WrestleMania 2000 called the Triangle Ladder match which also involved tables and chairs. But the first ever official TLC match took place between Edge and Christian, The Dudley Boyz and The Hardy Boyz at the WWF event SummerSlam 2000; and another at Wrestlemania X-Seven.

Due to the destructive, dangerous, violent, frenetic and physically demanding nature of these matches, every subsequent TLC match after the third one held a month after X-Seven was toned down to reduce the physical demands and risks this type of match poses. From 2009 to 2020, WWE has held a pay-per-view in December named TLC: Tables, Ladders & Chairs, which features this stipulation in its main event. The match has two variations: one is competed as a ladder match, which the person/people must retrieve an object suspended above the ring, and the other is a traditional style match won by pinfall or submission. In WWE, Edge has competed in the most TLC matches (7) including the first three, and has often used this match to gain an advantage in a storyline, with some referring to it as his specialty match.

This match has also been contested as hardcore match where a wrestler can win via pinfall or submission, and tables, ladders and chairs are heavily featured as weapons. Two examples were the "WeeLC" match in 2014 and the Tables, Ladders and Scares (a renamed TLC match) between Tony D’Angelo and Oba Femi in 2024.

==== Ultimate X match ====
The Ultimate X match is a "ladder match without the ladders" where two cables are strung metal structures rising from the four corners of the ring, crossing above the middle of the ring, forming an "X" pattern. The objective to win this match is to climb the turnbuckles and then climb hand-over-hand across the cables to claim the prize of the match, usually a championship belt. A signature match of TNA's X Division, the match is contested by three or more wrestlers.

=== Nigerian Drum Fight ===
A Nigerian Drum Fight is a no-disqualification stipulation weapons match where various musical percussion instruments used in traditional Nigerian music, such as bongos and a gong are made available at ringside, as are tables and kendo sticks. Big E faced Apollo Crews at WrestleMania 37 in a Nigerian Drum Fight.

=== Object on a Pole match ===
The Object on a Pole match, whose name is usually derived from the object being hung, i.e. "Brass knuckles on a Pole", "Steel chair on a pole, or "Judy Bagwell on a Forklift", is the spiritual forebear of the ladder match. In this case, an object is placed on a pole that extends from one of the four turnbuckles on the ring with the wrestlers battling to reach it first. Unlike the ladder match, however, reaching the object doesn't usually end the match; it simply allows that wrestler to use it as a weapon. This is not a no-disqualification match; the weapon on the pole is merely an exception to the disqualification rule. However, this is sometimes a no-disqualification match in which any weapon, plus the one on the pole, can be used. This match is referred to by many wrestling critics as a "Russo Special", due to the propensity of WCW booker Vince Russo's use of Pole Matches during his tenure at the company. Another World Championship Wrestling specialty is the San Francisco 49ers match, where four boxes are placed in the four corners of the ring, one with the championship belt and the other three with weapons. You must find the box with the belt to win the match and the championship. To date, this match is only known to have happened in a major wrestling federation once, with Booker T defeating Jeff Jarrett to become the WCW World Heavyweight champion on October 2, 2000.

Multiple variations of the "Pole match" exist. In some cases the match is closer to the ladder match, in that reaching the object does end the match. In others there will be objects above all of the turnbuckles. Further still, there can be a mixture of the two, with an object placed at (though not above) each turnbuckle, one to end the match, the rest to be used as weapons. Total Nonstop Action Wrestling used a "Pole match" as a setup to another match, placing objects at four of their six turnbuckles with the promise that the first wrestler to reach each object would be allowed to use them weeks later at an already scheduled cage match. In a Feast or Fired match each case contains a contract to fight for a TNA World Heavyweight Championship, TNA Tag Team Championship or TNA X-Division Championship, with the final case contains a pink slip, mean the holder of that case would be fired immediately, but if the person holding the X-Division title shot briefcase went on to win that title, it cannot be cashed in right away for the World Heavyweight Championship (Option C). The Coal Miner's Glove match is a variation of the typical "Object on a Pole match" in which the object in question is a coal miner's glove, which can be used on one's opponent upon retrieval.

==== Biker Chain match ====
A Biker Chain match is a hardcore match where a chain is attached to a pole and is the only legal weapon, but the objective of this match is to pin the opponent. Brock Lesnar and The Undertaker did a Biker Chain match at WWE's No Mercy 2003.

=== Pillow Fight ===
A pillow fight is a weapons match with only pillows and a bed are placed in the ring. The pillows may be used as weapons, but other than that, standard wrestling rules apply. Notably, Torrie Wilson once picked up the bed with Candice Michelle on it and threw it. Another variation, the Lingerie Pillow Fight, requires the participants to wear lingerie. Another variation, the Pajama Pillow Fight, requires the participants to wear pajamas.

=== Straitjacket match ===
In a straitjacket match, a wrestler must put their opponent into a straitjacket, usually after knocking the opponent out or by rendering them unconscious by submission holds. It made its televised debut on TNA when Samuel Shaw beat Mr. Anderson by first rendering him unconscious with a chokehold and then putting him into the straitjacket. On WWF Raw in June 1999, Ken Shamrock, who was the only participant confined to the straitjacket, still won his match with Jeff Jarrett after forcing him to submit to a headscissors submission hold.

=== Strap match ===
A strap match, known by many names and done with many slight variations, is any match in which the competitors are placed on the opposite ends of a restraint to keep them in close physical proximity. By definition, the strap and anything tied to it are considered legal and in play weapons. The most common rule for victory is to achieve a pinfall, but there is a common variation where one wrestler must circle the ring and touch all four corners in quick order, without interruption. Because of the strap's legality, and subsequent use as a choking device, submissions are generally not allowed.

The traditional strap match involves two wrestlers tied together via a leather strap, with the strap match being one of the most varied forms of professional wrestling match type, both in name and implements used. The name used for the match generally comes from the implement used and one or both of the participants. Common restraints include a belt, bullrope (length of rope with a cowbell the center), steel chains, one to two-foot "leash", or leather strap, where the wrestlers are tied together at one wrist. This match type is often named Caribbean Strap match when a wrestler from Puerto Rico (such as Savio Vega) is participating on the match or the match is being held on a Puerto Rican promotion like the International Wrestling Association.

==== Barbed Wire Chain Deathmatch ====
A Barbed Wire Chain Deathmatch is a strap match where instead of two wrestlers being bound together with a leather strap at the wrists, they are bound together with barbed wire at the wrists. This match was done a few times in 1995 in the IWA promotion in Japan with Shoji Nakamaki, Hiroshi Ono and Cactus Jack.

==== Dog collar match ====
A Dog Collar match is a type of strap match where instead of a leather strap at a wrist, the competing wrestlers are bound together by the neck via dog collars and chains. Made famous by the match between Roddy Piper and Greg Valentine at Starrcade '83: A Flare for the Gold, AEW has brought the match back in recent times, with Brodie Lee vs. Cody following the stipulation in 2020 (the last match of the former's career before his death later that year), and CM Punk vs. MJF at Revolution being highly regarded for their violence. Punk himself competed in another famously violent dog collar match against Raven at ROH Death Before Dishonor 2003.

==== Four Corners Strap match ====
The Four Corners Strap match is when the first wrestler to touch all four turnbuckle pads in succession without any form of interruption from his opponent or anyone else wins. If at any point a wrestler starts touching pads but is taken down before the wrestler can finish touching them all, they must start over again. There are no pinfalls, no submissions, no countouts, or no disqualifications in this match. At WCW's Uncensored 1995, Hulk Hogan actually dragged non-participant (Ric Flair) to all four corners to win his strap match against Big Van Vader. This match was renamed a Samoan Strap match for WWE's Extreme Rules 2009 pay-per-view with Umaga facing off against CM Punk. WCW has their own variation strap match as well named the Yapapi Indian Strap match between Hulk Hogan vs. Ric Flair at the 2000 Uncensored pay-per-view. A No Surrender Dog Collar Strap match is a strap match with the "No Surrender" stipulation added, meaning that neither competitor would be permitted to submit in the match. TNA had a main event at the TNA No Surrender 2005 pay-per-view for the NWA World Heavyweight Championship between Raven and Abyss, which Raven won. All Elite Wrestling (AEW) also has its own variation of the Four Corners Strap match, dubbed the South Beach Strap match, which has been used once in a match between Cody Rhodes and Q. T. Marshall at the Road Rager event in July 2021. It was named as such due to the event taking place in Downtown Miami, close to the neighbourhood of South Beach.

==== Russian chain match ====
A Russian Chain match is a type of strap match where instead of an elastic strap, a thick, 15-foot steel chain is used to bound the wrestlers, and this chain is often used as a weapon. This match has come under many names, including a Texas Chain match and a Tennessee Chain match. A Biker Chain match is a variation of an Object on a Pole match. The Russian Chain match was the speciality of Ivan Koloff and Boris Malenko.

==== Texas Bullrope match ====
A Texas Bullrope match is a type of strap match where the wrestlers are bound together by a thick cattle rope with a cowbell attached; the objective of this match is to achieve a single pinfall, or in another variation, victory is achieved by touching all four turnbuckles successively similar to a standard Strap Match (as in the case of JBL vs. Eddie Guerrero in The Great American Bash (2004)). The Rock had his own signature match, the Brahma Bullrope match which was a renamed Texas Bullrope match. Another variation of the match, a Texas Lariat match, has wrestlers bound to a lariat rope, instead of a bullrope.

=== Stretcher match ===
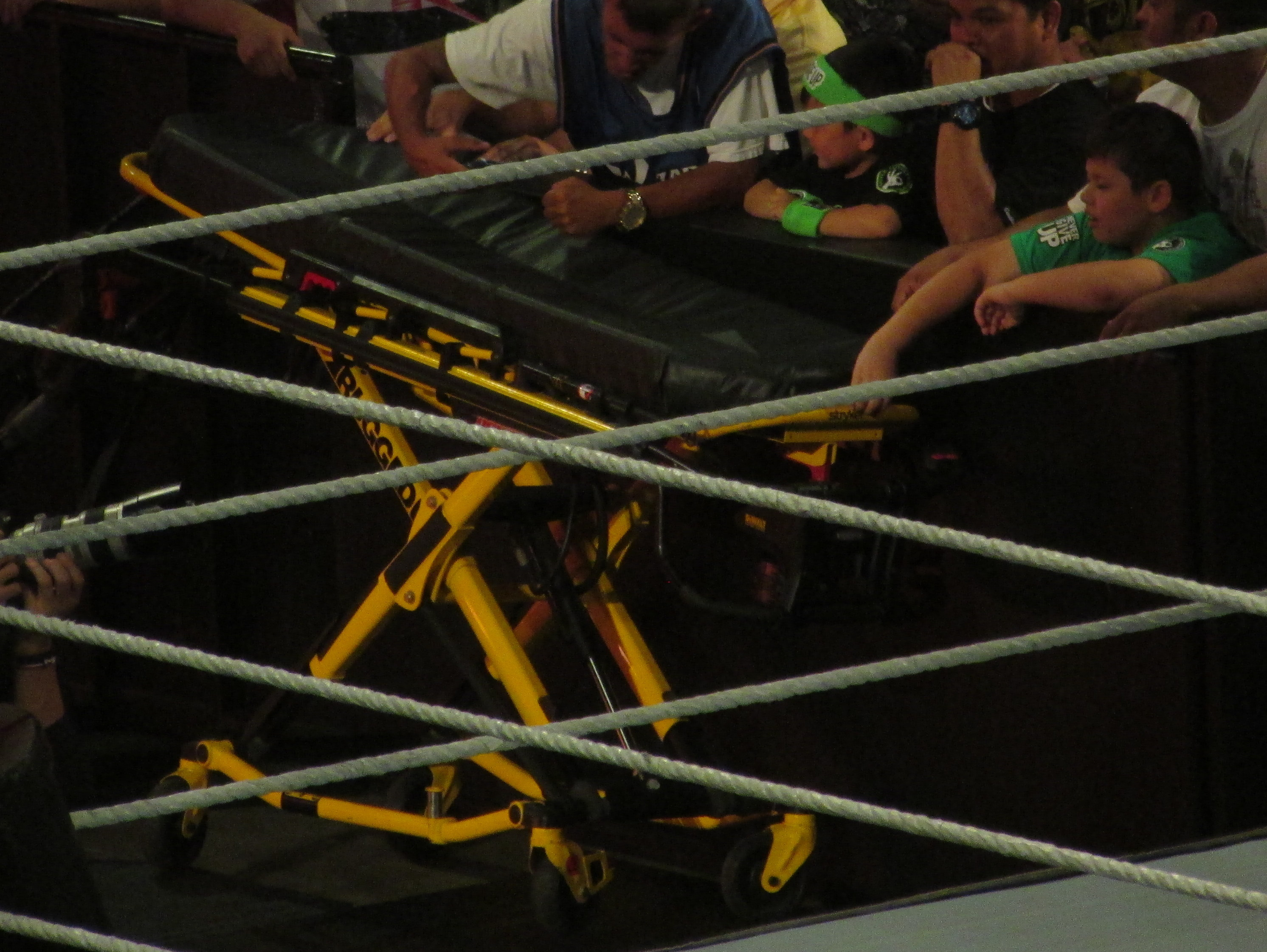
A stretcher at ringside prior to a stretcher match

A Stretcher match is a hardcore match where a wrestler must incapacitate their opponent to such an extent that they are able to get them onto a stretcher and roll them to the finish line for the victory; usually past a line at the top of the entrance ramp. The stretcher can also be used as a weapon. Stretcher matches contested in All Elite Wrestling are a combination of a stretcher match and an ambulance match, where the objective is to place your opponent onto a stretcher, roll the stretcher into the back of an ambulance, and close both doors to gain the victory.

=== Steel Stairs match ===
A Steel Stairs match is a hardcore match where the only legal weapon are any number of steel stairs typically situated on the opposite sides of the ring that can be used to enter the ring. The Big Show faced Erick Rowan in a Steel Stairs match at the TLC 2014 WWE pay-per view.

=== Symphony of Destruction match ===
A Symphony of Destruction match is a hardcore match where various musical instruments are available at ringside as weapons. This is Elias's speciality match and debuted in 2018 when Elias faced Braun Strowman.

=== Tables match ===
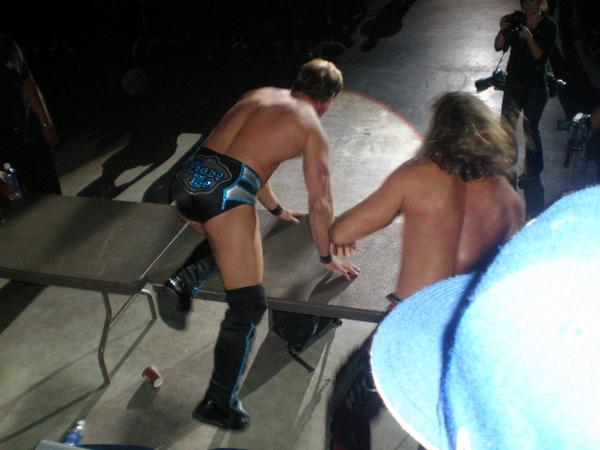
Chris Jericho (left) and Shawn Michaels on a table at a 2008 house show in Puerto Rico

A Tables match is a hardcore match in which, to win, one's opponent must be driven through a table. It can only be won with an offensive maneuver.

Tables matches can be contested with tag teams, under both elimination and one fall rules. The first tables match was contested at ECW's 1995 Double Tables event between The Public Enemy and The Tazmaniac & Sabu for the ECW World Tag Team Championship, whilst the first in the WWE was a tag-team Tables match with The Hardy Boyz versus The Dudley Boyz at the 2000 Royal Rumble. The objective of both of these matches was to drive all opposing team members through tables with offensive moves, but subsequent WWE Tables matches have only required one member to be driven through a table. It is common for tables matches to also include a "no-disqualification" clause, turning them into hardcore matches (although this variation may also be known as a Hardcore Tables match). In some tag matches, a person can save his teammate by breaking the table with his own body. Apparently this does not count against the team.

==== Flaming Tables match ====
A Flaming Tables match is an Extreme Championship Wrestling specialty match where the tables are set on fire and the only way to win is to put opponents through the flaming tables.

==== Thanksgiving Leftovers Throwdown ====
The Thanksgiving Leftovers Throwdown is a specialty match based on the Thanksgiving holiday. It debuted on the November 26, 2021 Black Friday edition of SmackDown between Rick Boogs and Angel Garza. It is a standard wrestling match with a table by ringside covered with leftover foods. No competitor was thrown into the table although Humberto Carrillo, who distracted Boogs, was thrown into the table by Shinsuke Nakamura.

==== Two out of Three Tables match ====
A Two out of Three Tables match is a hardcore match where it can only be won when a wrestler or tag team puts their opponent or opponent's team through two tables, but it does not have to be at the same time. Performing a move on double tables does not count as a victory. It is also a variation of a two out of three falls match.

=== Taped fist match ===
For a taped fist match, the wrestlers are allowed to tape and/or wrap their hands to allow them to punch harder without damaging their hands. The wrestlers must compete with their fists taped, the idea being that this would make it harder to grab each other while at the same time protecting their hands while punching, encouraging the athletes to "fight" instead of wrestle. In one variation, the Taipei Deathmatch, the taped fists are dipped in super glue, then broken glass.

=== Viking Rules match ===
The Viking Rules match is a viking-themed hardcore match with the ring decorated in a style of a viking ship. This match was introduced by The Viking Raiders on the September 2, 2022, edition of SmackDown (taped on August 26, 2022) against The New Day.

=== Water Fight ===
A water fight is a weapons match which the ring is surrounded with buckets of water, water guns and water balloons to use as weapons. Other than that, standard wrestling rules apply. Notably, Jillian Hall once smacked Mickie James over the head with a water gun during this match.

=== Weapon Rumble ===
The Weapon Rumble is a hardcore match invented in DDT Pro-Wrestling in which, similarly to a Rumble rules match, with every time interval a new weapon is introduced in the match. The weapons are chosen by the participants beforehand and can widely vary due to the loose interpretation of the definition of a "weapon" that's used by the company in a comedic manner.

=== Weapons Wild match ===
A Weapons Wild match is a hardcore match where various blunt weapons are made available along the padded barriers at ringside, and are all legal. Wrestlers are armed with at least one weapon when they start the match. This match originated in WWE's NXT promotion.

== Winner Takes All match ==
Two scenarios constitute a Winner Takes All match; a title-versus-title match is a match in which both wrestlers (or teams if a tag team match) are champions going into the match, and the winner receives the championship of the loser, thus "taking all". This differs from a championship unification match, where one championship is absorbed into the other and retired/deactivated. In a Winner Take All scenario, both titles are still active and defended as separate entities. Winner Takes All matches may also take the form of tag team matches, in which two separate titles are fought for in the same match; such as when Seth Rollins and Becky Lynch defended the Universal Championship and Raw Women's Championship respectively against Baron Corbin and Lacey Evans at 2019's Extreme Rules event.

== Sources ==
- Text was copied from Wrestling match types at the Pro Wrestling wiki, which is released under a Creative Commons Attribution-Share Alike 3.0 (Unported) (CC BY-SA 3.0) license.
- Foley, Mick (2000). Have a Nice Day: A Tale of Blood and Sweatsocks. HarperCollins. ISBN 0-06-103101-1.
- Reynolds, R. D. (2003). Wrestlecrap: The Very Worst of Pro Wrestling. ECW Press. ISBN 1-55022-584-7.
- PWI Staff (2007). "Pro Wrestling Illustrated presents: 2007 Wrestling almanac & book of facts". Wrestling's historical cards. Kappa Publishing.
