= Insurrextion (2000) =

World Wrestling Federation pay-per-view event

- VHS cover featuring The Rock, Triple H, and Shane McMahon
- Promotion: World Wrestling Federation
- Date: May 6, 2000
- City: London, England
- Venue: Earls Court Exhibition Centre
- Attendance: 17,000
- Tagline: London Bridge isn't the only thing Falling Down

Pay-per-view chronology
← Previous; Backlash	Next → Judgment Day

Insurrextion chronology
← Previous; First	Next → 2001

WWE in Europe chronology
← Previous; Rebellion (1999)	Next → Rebellion (2000)

The 2000 Insurrextion was a professional wrestling pay-per-view (PPV) event produced by the American promotion World Wrestling Federation (WWF, now WWE) and broadcast exclusively in the United Kingdom. It was the inaugural Insurrextion and took place on May 6, 2000, at the Earls Court Exhibition Centre in London, England.

== Production ==
=== Background ===
In 1999, the American professional wrestling promotion World Wrestling Federation (WWF, now WWE) ran two pay-per-view (PPV) events in, and broadcast exclusively for, the United Kingdom. The first was No Mercy, which was held in May, and the second was Rebellion in October; the No Mercy name was later used for another PPV held in the United States that same month, which became a mainstay on WWF's PPV calendar. In early 2000, the promotion announced that May's United Kingdom-exclusive event would be titled Insurrextion. It was scheduled to be held on Saturday, May 6, 2000, at the Earls Court Exhibition Centre in London, England.

=== Storylines ===
The event featured ten professional wrestling matches and two pre-show matches that involved different wrestlers from pre-existing scripted feuds and storylines. Wrestlers portrayed villains, heroes, or less distinguishable characters in the scripted events that built tension and culminated in a wrestling match or series of matches.

== Aftermath ==
A second Insurrextion event was held the following year, also in the United Kingdom, thus establishing Insurrextion as an annual UK-exclusive PPV for the promotion. The event was discontinued after its 2003 event as the promotion started to broadcast Raw and SmackDown! from the UK in 2004.

Crash Holly would win back the Hardcore Championship three days later on the next episode of Raw when WWE returned to the United States.

== Reception ==
In 2008, J.D. Dunn of 411Mania gave the event a rating of 7.5 [Good], stating, "Normally a nothing PPV, this rivals the US PPVs in terms of quality. Sadly, the Benoit/Angle match was kept short due to Benoit's eye injury. Most of the stuff here was either good wrestling or had some sort of fun element involved. Thumbs up."

== Results ==
No.	Results	Stipulations	Times
1	Too Cool (Scotty 2 Hotty and Grand Master Sexay) defeated The Radicalz (Perry Saturn and Dean Malenko)	Tag team match	7:00
2	Kane (with Paul Bearer) defeated Bull Buchanan	Singles match	3:31
3	Road Dogg (with Tori) defeated Bradshaw	Singles match	5:58
4	The Kat (with Mae Young) defeated Terri Runnels (with The Fabulous Moolah)	Arm Wrestling match	0:34
5	Rikishi and Big Show defeated The Dudley Boyz (Bubba Ray Dudley and D-Von Dudley)	Tag team match	7:10
6	Kurt Angle defeated Chris Benoit	Singles match	6:04
7	The British Bulldog defeated Crash Holly (c)	Hardcore match for the WWF Hardcore Championship	3:37
8	The Hardy Boyz (Matt Hardy and Jeff Hardy) defeated Edge and Christian (c) by disqualification	Tag team match for the WWF Tag Team Championship	12:53
9	Eddie Guerrero (c) (with Chyna) defeated Chris Jericho	Singles match for the WWF European Championship	12:56
10	The Rock (c) defeated Triple H (with Stephanie McMahon-Helmsley) and Shane McMahon (with Mr. McMahon)	Triple threat match for the WWF Championship	15:37
(c) / – the champion(s) heading into the match

== Other on-screen talent ==
Commentators

- Jim Ross
- Jerry "The King" Lawler

Interviewers

- Michael Cole

Ring announcer

- Tony Chimel

Referees

- Jimmy Korderas
- Mike Chioda
- Teddy Long
- Tim White

== See also ==
- Professional wrestling in the United Kingdom
