= Clash at the Castle (2022) =

WWE premium live event

- Promotional poster featuring Roman Reigns and Drew McIntyre with Cardiff Castle in the background
- Promotion: WWE
- Brand(s): Raw; SmackDown
- Date: September 3, 2022
- City: Cardiff, Wales
- Venue: Principality Stadium
- Attendance: 62,215

WWE event chronology
← Previous; SummerSlam	Next → Worlds Collide

Clash at the Castle chronology
← Previous; First	Next → 2024

WWE in Europe chronology
← Previous; NXT UK TakeOver: Blackpool II	Next → Money in the Bank

The 2022 Clash at the Castle was a professional wrestling premium live event (PLE) produced by the American company WWE, held for wrestlers from the promotion's main roster brands, Raw and SmackDown. It was the inaugural Clash at the Castle and took place on Saturday, September 3, 2022, at the Principality Stadium in Cardiff, Wales and aired live at 6:00 pm British Summer Time (1:00 p.m. Eastern Time). This marked WWE's first major stadium event to take place in the United Kingdom since the 1992 SummerSlam and the company's first UK PLE overall since Insurrextion in 2003. The event's title was a reference to Cardiff Castle, situated near the Principality Stadium.

Seven matches were contested at the event, including one on the Kickoff pre-show. In the main event, Roman Reigns defeated UK native Drew McIntyre to retain the Undisputed WWE Universal Championship. In other prominent matches, Seth "Freakin" Rollins defeated Matt Riddle, Gunther defeated Sheamus to retain Raw's Intercontinental Championship, and in the opening bout, Damage CTRL (Bayley, Dakota Kai, and Iyo Sky) defeated Bianca Belair, Alexa Bliss, and Asuka in a six-woman tag team match. The event was also notable for the main roster debuts of NXT's Giovanni Vinci, who rejoined Gunther and Ludwig Kaiser to reform Imperium, and Solo Sikoa, one of Reigns's cousins and the younger brother of The Usos (Jey Uso and Jimmy Uso), thus officially joining The Bloodline stable.

== Production ==
=== Background ===
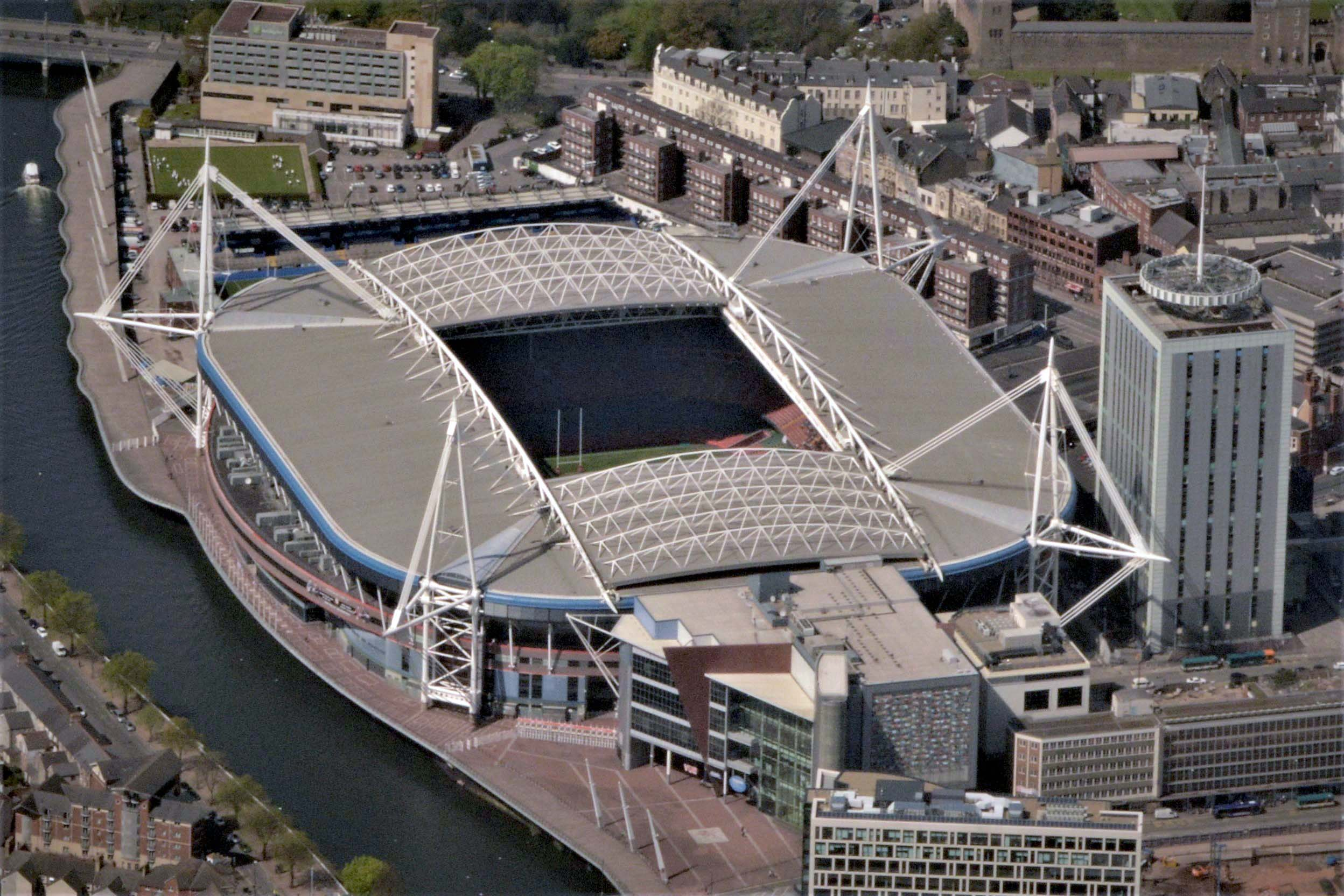
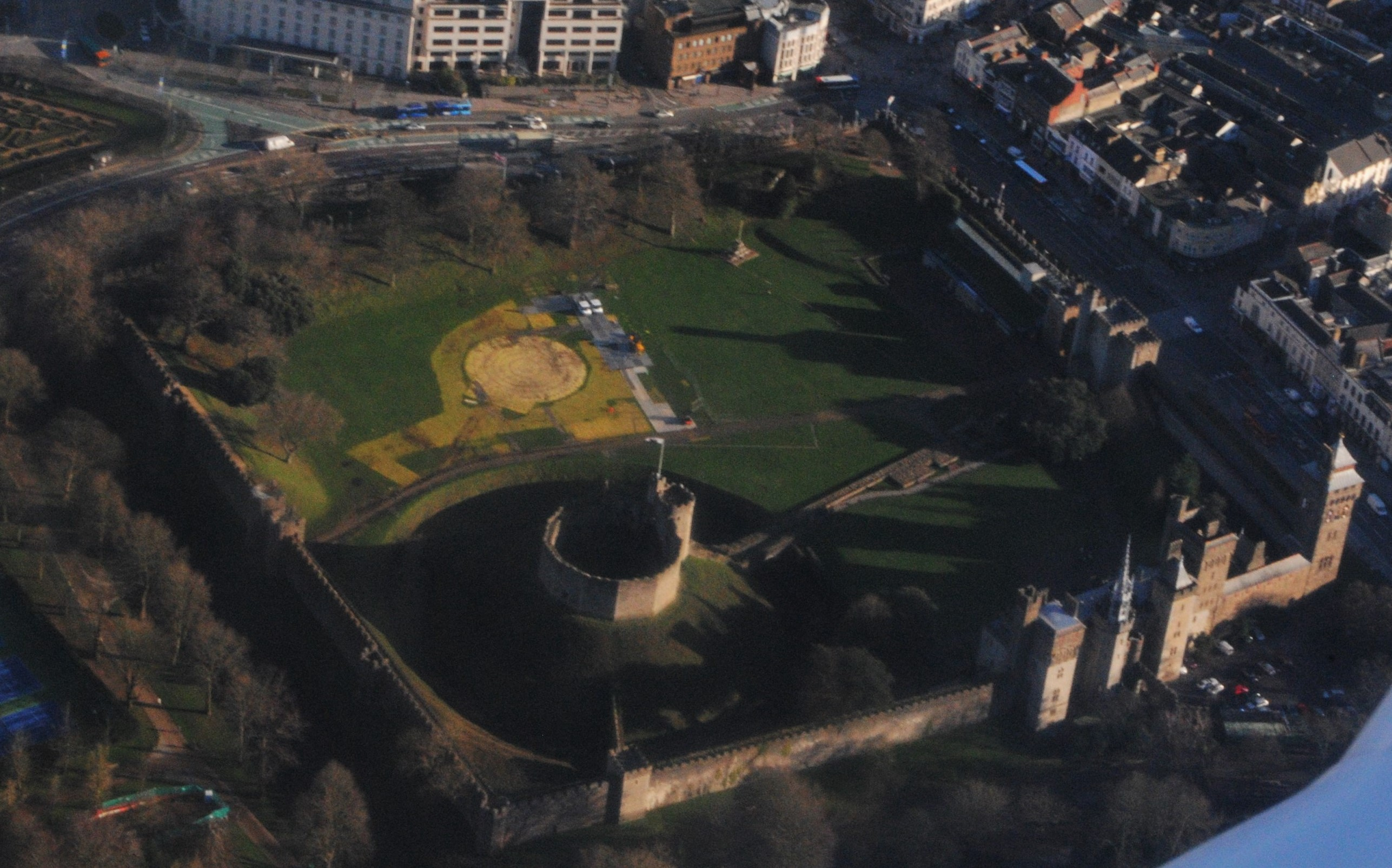
The inaugural Clash at the Castle was held at the Principality Stadium in Cardiff, Wales. It was named in reference to the Cardiff Castle, situated near the stadium.

On October 25, 2021, the American professional wrestling promotion WWE revealed its 2022 premium live event (PLE) schedule for the Raw and SmackDown brands, with an event slotted for Labor Day weekend at a to be determined location. On April 12, 2022, while the PLE's title was not announced, WWE confirmed that it would be held on Saturday, September 3 at Principality Stadium in Cardiff, Wales, marking the company's first major stadium event to be held in the United Kingdom (UK) in 30 years. Although WWE's last major event to take place in the UK was the 2003 Insurrextion, the promotion's last major event to be held in a stadium in the UK was the 1992 SummerSlam at the original Wembley Stadium. WWE had originally planned to host the event at present day Wembley Stadium; however, the company was offered more money to host it at the Principality Stadium. On April 29, 2022, during a WWE Live event at London's O2 Arena, WWE wrestler and UK native Drew McIntyre revealed the PLE's title as Clash at the Castle, a reference to Cardiff Castle situated near the stadium.

In the first 24 hours after the event's initial announcement, it was reported that 59,000 people had pre-registered for tickets. This broke a company record at the time, with more fans registering for pre-sale tickets than any other WWE event, including WrestleMania. Tickets went on sale on May 20, with hospitality packages also available. By August 19, 2022, 63,803 tickets had been sold.

=== Broadcast outlets ===
The PLE aired on pay-per-view (PPV) worldwide. It was also available to livestream on Peacock in the United States, SonyLIV in India, Disney+ Hotstar in Indonesia, and the WWE Network everywhere else. Unlike WWE's other PLEs broadcast in the UK, which air on BT Sport Box Office, Clash at the Castle aired on BT Sport 2, making it available for all subscribers. With the event being held in Cardiff, Wales, it aired live at 6:00 pm British Summer Time (1:00 p.m. Eastern Time).

=== Storylines ===
The event comprised seven matches, including one on the Kickoff pre-show, that resulted from scripted storylines. Results were predetermined by WWE's writers on the Raw and SmackDown brands, while storylines were produced on WWE's weekly television shows, Monday Night Raw and Friday Night SmackDown.

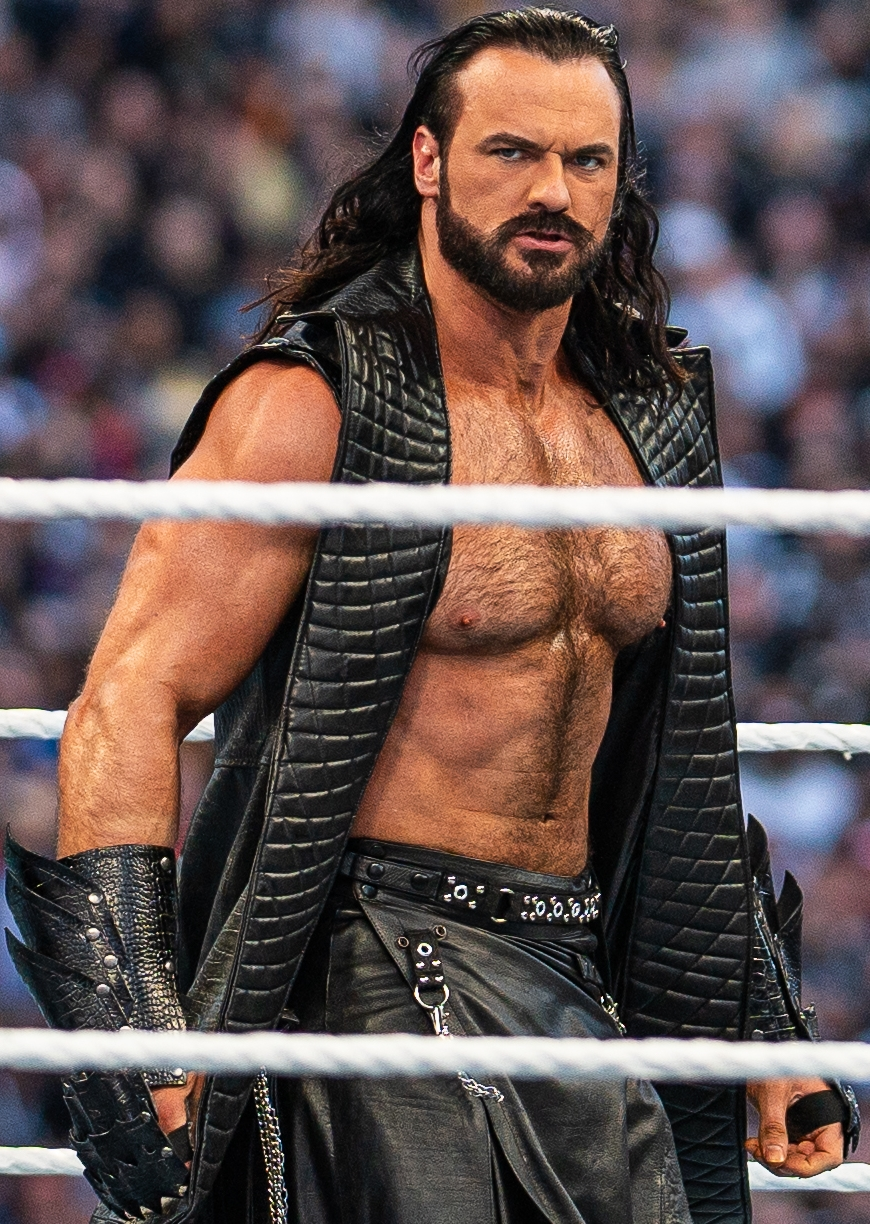
Drew McIntyre challenged for the Undisputed WWE Universal Championship in the main event in his home country of the United Kingdom.

On the July 8 episode of SmackDown, Drew McIntyre was scheduled to face fellow European native Sheamus to determine the number one contender for the Undisputed WWE Universal Championship at Clash at the Castle. As Sheamus feigned illness, the match did not occur. The match was later rescheduled for the July 29 episode as a Good Old Fashioned Donnybrook match, which McIntyre won. At SummerSlam the following night, Roman Reigns retained the undisputed title, thus confirming that Reigns would be the defending champion against McIntyre at Clash at the Castle.

On the August 5 episode of SmackDown, Shayna Baszler won a gauntlet match to earn a match against Liv Morgan for the SmackDown Women's Championship at Clash at the Castle.

After Bianca Belair retained the Raw Women's Championship at SummerSlam, she was confronted by the newly formed stable of Bayley, Dakota Kai, and Iyo Sky. On the following episode of Raw, Bayley, Kai, and Sky interfered in a match between Alexa Bliss and Asuka. Belair would join the fray, siding with Bliss and Asuka. The following week, Bayley, Kai, and Sky challenged Belair, Bliss, and Asuka to a six-woman tag team match at Clash at the Castle, which was accepted by Belair.

At SummerSlam, Matt Riddle was originally scheduled to face Seth "Freakin" Rollins, however, the match was called off due to Riddle suffering an injury (kayfabe) incurred by Rollins on the Raw prior to the event. At the event, however, Riddle appeared and called out Rollins and the two brawled, which ended with Rollins performing the Stomp on Riddle. On the August 15 episode of Raw, Riddle revealed that he was medically cleared. Later that same night, Riddle engaged into another brawl with Rollins before challenging him to a match at Clash at the Castle, which was made official.

On the August 19 episode of SmackDown, Sheamus won a fatal five-way match to become the number one contender for Gunther's Intercontinental Championship at Clash at the Castle.

At SummerSlam, The Mysterios (Rey Mysterio and Dominik Mysterio) defeated The Judgment Day (Damian Priest and Finn Bálor), accompanied by Rhea Ripley, after interference from Edge, who was kicked out of Judgment Day in June. Over the coming weeks, Edge and The Mysterios continued feuding with The Judgment Day, and on the August 22 episode, following Edge's win over Priest in the former's hometown of Toronto, Ontario, Canada, Edge attempted a con-chair-to on Priest, only to be hit by a low blow by Ripley. Bálor joined the fight, only for Edge's wife, Beth Phoenix, to come to Edge's aid. The following week, after Priest and Bálor's match, Priest, Bálor, and Ripley vowed to end Edge's career at Clash at the Castle. Edge then appeared, leading to The Mysterios attacking Judgment Day, who were able to escape. Later that night, a match pitting Edge and Rey against Priest and Bálor was made official for Clash at the Castle.

== Event ==
Other on-screen personnel
Role:	Name:
English commentators	Michael Cole
English commentators	Corey Graves
English commentators	Byron Saxton
Spanish commentators	Marcelo Rodriguez
Spanish commentators	Jerry Soto
Ring announcer	Samantha Irvin
Referees	Shawn Bennett
Referees	Dan Engler
Referees	Jessika Carr
Referees	Eddie Orengo
Referees	Charles Robinson
Referees	Rod Zapata
Pre-show panel	Jackie Redmond
Pre-show panel	Matt Camp
Pre-show panel	Peter Rosenberg

=== Pre-show ===
During the Clash at the Castle Kickoff pre-show, Madcap Moss teamed with The Street Profits (Angelo Dawkins and Montez Ford) to face the team of Austin Theory and Alpha Academy (Chad Gable and Otis) in a six-man tag team match. In the end, Ford performed a From the Heavens on Gable to win the match.

=== Preliminary matches ===
The actual PLE opened with Alexa Bliss, Asuka, and Raw Women's Champion Bianca Belair facing Damage CTRL (Bayley, Dakota Kai, and Iyo Sky) in a six-woman tag team match. In the end, Sky performed a moonsault on Belair and Bayley pinned Belair to win the match.

Next, Gunther (accompanied by the reformed Imperium (Giovanni Vinci and Ludwig Kaiser)) defended the Intercontinental Championship against Sheamus (accompanied by The Brawling Brutes (Butch and Ridge Holland)). Before the match, a brawl ensued between The Brawling Brutes and Imperium, while Sheamus and Gunther stared each other down in the ring. During the match, Sheamus performed the White Noise and Celtic Cross on Gunther for a nearfall. In the closing moments, Gunther countered a Brogue Kick attempt from Sheamus and performed a powerbomb and lariat on Sheamus to retain the title. Following the match, Sheamus received a standing ovation from the crowd.

After that, Liv Morgan defended the SmackDown Women's Championship against Shayna Baszler. In the end, Morgan performed the Oblivion on Baszler to retain the title.

In the fourth match, Edge and Rey Mysterio (accompanied by Dominik Mysterio) faced The Judgment Day (Damian Priest and Finn Bálor; accompanied by Rhea Ripley). In the closing moments, Rey and Edge performed the 619 and Spear, respectively, on Bálor to win the match. Following the match, Dominik attacked Edge with a low blow and his father Rey with a clothesline, turning heel for the first time in his career, and joining The Judgment Day.

In the penultimate match, Matt Riddle faced Seth "Freakin" Rollins. As Rollins attempted a rolling elbow, Riddle countered and applied the triangle choke on Rollins. Rollins countered the submission and performed the Bro Derek on Riddle for a nearfall. Rollins countered a powerbomb from Riddle and performed a Pedigree for a nearfall. Rollins mocked Riddle's tag team partner, Randy Orton, by performing a Hangman's DDT on Riddle. In the climax, Riddle threw Rollins on the announce table and attempted to attack Rollins with a steel chair, only for Rollins to avoid Riddle. As Riddle re-entered the ring, Rollins performed the Stomp. Rollins then performed a second Stomp on Riddle, this time from the middle rope, to win the match.

=== Main event ===
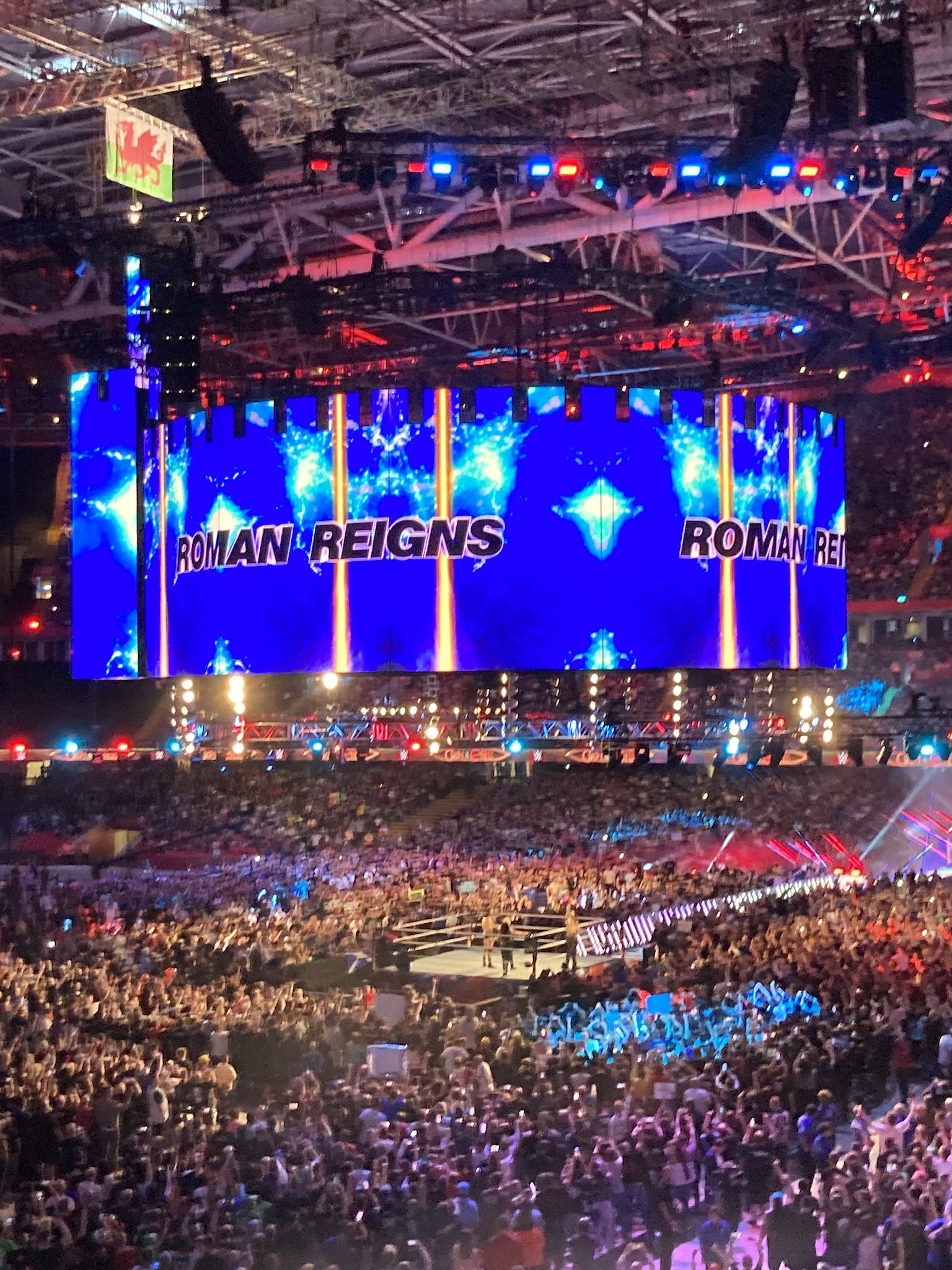
Principality Stadium during Roman Reigns's entrance

In the main event, Roman Reigns defended the Undisputed WWE Universal Championship against Drew McIntyre. Karrion Kross was at ringside and taunted McIntyre at one point, as they were feuding at that time. During the match, as Reigns attempted a Superman Punch, McIntyre countered and performed the Future Shock DDT. Reigns then performed a Spear on McIntyre for a nearfall. Reigns applied the Guillotine on McIntyre, who escaped. As McIntyre performed the Claymore Kick on Reigns, Reigns inadvertently bumped into the referee, incapacitating him. Austin Theory ran out and attempted to cash in his Money in the Bank contract, however, professional boxer and UK native Tyson Fury, who was in the front row, knocked him out. Reigns then obtained a chair and entered the ring, however, McIntyre performed a Claymore on Reigns for a nearfall. In the climax, after Reigns performed another Superman Punch, he attempted a Spear, however, McIntyre countered and performed his own Spear on Reigns. McIntyre then performed a Claymore on Reigns, only for NXT's Solo Sikoa, a younger cousin of Reigns, to pull the referee outside the ring. Reigns then performed a Spear on McIntyre to retain the titles. Following the match, Fury entered the ring and shook Reigns' hand. Fury then tended to a disappointed McIntyre, who was seated in the corner of the ring, and stated that regardless of the result, McIntyre still made his country proud. Fury then lead McIntyre and the crowd into singing "American Pie", while McIntyre initiated the singing of "Don't Look Back in Anger".

== Reception ==
The event received universal acclaim from fans and critics, particularly for the Intercontinental Championship match which received five stars from Dave Meltzer. The main event, however, was criticized by some for its ending. The match received a 4.5 star rating, while Rollins vs. Riddle received a 4.25 star rating. Triple H said that Clash at the Castle was a massive success, stating that Clash at the Castle was the number one international PPV in WWE history, the highest rated UK PPV in WWE history, and the best-selling non-WrestleMania event in WWE history.

Wesley Roesch of Wrestling Inc. called Clash at the Castle the "best 2022 Premium Live Event", stating that "from start to finish, the event was a classic". He stated that the six-woman tag team match "set up a feud between Bayley and Belair", and the SmackDown Women's Championship match was "a good women's title match". Roesch stated that Edge and Rey vs. Judgment Day was "an entertaining match", and Dominik "earned massive heat" with his attack on Edge and Rey. Roesch called the three "standout matches" on the card the Riddle vs. Rollins match, which "blew off an outstanding, personal jab-filled matchup", the Undisputed WWE Universal Championship match, which was a "30-minute clinic" between Reigns and McIntyre, and the Intercontinental title match, which Roesch stated as "the best match of the night" and a "five-star match of the year candidate", stating that Sheamus vs. Gunther was "an absolutely brutal, hard-hitting match that the crowd clearly loved", and that Gunther retaining the title was "a great way to put him over as a major threat in WWE".

Brent Brookhouse of CBS Sports stated that "from start to finish, Clash at the Castle brought it in the ring, including one of the best matches of the year". He called the six-woman tag team match "a very fun match", Dominik Mysterio's betrayal on Rey "a long time coming, but WWE needed to pull the trigger eventually", and the Rollins vs. Riddle match "a good, hard-hitting match". Brookhouse called the main event match "a very good match that could have used a bit better pacing early on and a fine way to keep the belts on Reigns while keeping McIntyre strong", and gave the Intercontinental Championship match a grade of A+, the highest rated match of the night, stating that the match "was a perfect match for what these two men do. An old-school bout featuring true physicality".

Wade Keller of Pro Wrestling Torch gave the six-woman tag team match 2.25 stars, stating that the match had a few "clunky spots", but "the crowd was red-hot and still into it late despite the length". He called Dominik Mysterio's betrayal on Rey getting "a ton of old school heat", and gave the Intercontinental Championship match 4.25 stars, stating that the "95 percent of the offense as chops and forearms" "added up to a brutal and compelling and effective match". Keller gave the highest rated matches of the event the Rollins vs. Riddle match and the main event, both receiving 4.5 stars, stating that Rollins vs. Riddle was an "excellent match". He said that "not only were the moves well-executed, but so many had a psychological back story by either using the other person's moves or Orton's", and that "a lack of selling big spots in order to keep the action going" "baked into the modern "big match" style, so be it". Keller called the main event "an amazing main event in so many ways", stating that "Reigns's current reign is so special and effective, it's hard to question the decision to keep the belt on him". He called the finish "a copout", but "in Levesque's defense he inherited this match on the schedule and shouldn't be criticized for doing such a good, convincing job building up Drew as a possible winner here", and also said that "Theory's run-in was a fun moment".

== Aftermath ==
Due to the success of Clash at the Castle, on January 5, 2023, WWE announced a return to the United Kingdom for the annual Money in the Bank event on July 1, 2023, at London's O2 Arena. According to the Welsh government, the event channelled £21.8 million into the Welsh economy, which was 10 times more than they had paid WWE to do the event there. A Clash at the Castle event was not held in 2023, but it was scheduled to return to the UK in 2024 in Glasgow, Scotland titled Clash at the Castle: Scotland, although with no reference to any specific castle in Glasgow and instead a general reference to the various castles found in and around the city.

=== Raw ===
On the following episode of Raw, Edge came out and stated that he had known Dominik Mysterio for a long time and recounted his history with the Mysterio family. Rey, Dominik's father, then came out and wanted an explanation for Dominik's actions. Dominik then came out, flanked by The Judgment Day (Finn Bálor, Damian Priest, and Rhea Ripley) and ignored his father. After Rey sadly walked backstage, Edge then vowed to get an answer out of Dominik, however, Judgment Day viciously attacked Edge. Later that night, Rey faced Priest in a losing effort. The following week, Edge defeated Dominik by disqualification after interference from The Judgment Day. After the match, they attacked Edge with a steel chair, ending the attack by placing the chair on Edge's leg and Bálor performing a Coup de Grâce on the chair. Two weeks later, Edge returned and challenged Bálor to an "I Quit" match at Extreme Rules, and Bálor accepted.

Also on Raw, footage was shown of Seth "Freakin" Rollins rejecting Matt Riddle's rematch challenge immediately after their match at Clash at the Castle. The following week, Riddle lost his match after interference from Rollins. On the September 19 episode, Riddle cost Rollins his United States Championship match. Later that night, Rollins caused Riddle to lose in tag team action. While the two were fighting backstage, Rollins challenged Riddle to a match, and Riddle accepted as a Fight Pit match for Extreme Rules. On October 1, UFC Hall of Famer Daniel Cormier was appointed as the special guest referee for the match.

Also, Damage CTRL (Bayley, Dakota Kai, and Iyo Sky) continued to target Alexa Bliss, Asuka, and Raw Women's Champion Bianca Belair. Kai and Sky went on to win the WWE Women's Tag Team Championship on the September 12 episode of Raw. The following week, Bliss, Asuka, and Belair interrupted Damage CTRL's celebration for Kai and Sky's victory, leading to a match between Bliss and Bayley for that episode's main event, where Bayley won. After the match, Kai, Sky, and Bayley attacked Bliss. Belair made the save, but was also attacked by the three, as was Asuka. Bayley then stated that she wanted a Raw Women's Championship match at Extreme Rules, reiterating the fact that she pinned Belair at Clash at the Castle. On the September 26 episode, Bayley challenged Belair to a ladder match for the title at Extreme Rules, and Belair accepted. Belair then defeated Sky. The following week, Sky defeated Bliss due to Bayley and Kai preventing interference from Asuka and Belair. After the match, Damage CTRL laid out Bliss, Asuka (who would both be out of action for four weeks), and Belair before heading on the top of a ladder.

=== SmackDown ===
On the following episode of SmackDown, Solo Sikoa officially joined The Bloodline, thus making his main roster debut. Later that night, Sikoa fought Drew McIntyre where he lost via disqualification due to Karrion Kross attacking McIntyre, who would begin a rivalry with Kross. On September 23, a strap match between the two was scheduled for Extreme Rules. McIntyre would then renew the rivalry against the original iteration of The Bloodline (also known as the "OG Bloodline") in which Zayn, Reigns, and The Usos became babyfaces while forming an alliance with the Sikoa-led Bloodline, which since added Tama Tonga, Tonga Loa, and Jacob Fatu from December 2024.

Also on SmackDown, Imperium (Gunther, Ludwig Kaiser, and Giovanni Vinci) defeated The Brawling Brutes (Sheamus, Ridge Holland, and Butch) in a six-man tag team match. The following week, both teams took part in a fatal four-way tag team match to determine the number one contenders for the Undisputed WWE Tag Team Championship, which The Brawling Brutes (Butch and Holland) won. The following week, however, Butch and Holland failed to win the titles due to Imperium interfering. On September 29, a Good Old Fashioned Donnybrook match between the two teams was scheduled for Extreme Rules. Prior to Extreme Rules, Sheamus faced Gunther in a rematch for the Intercontinental Championship on the October 7 episode of SmackDown where Gunther retained after he struck Sheamus with a shillelagh while the referee was distracted.

On the October 14 episode of SmackDown, Rey Mysterio was traded to SmackDown to avoid The Judgment Day (Damian Priest, Rhea Ripley, Finn Bálor, and Dominik Mysterio) on Raw. However, Rey and Dominik's paths would cross again at the 2023 Royal Rumble. Rey was supposed to compete in the men's Royal Rumble match, but he never came out when his entrance music played. Dominik then entered, carrying Rey's mask, implying that he attacked his dad to prevent him from entering. With Ripley winning the women's Royal Rumble match and choosing to challenge for the SmackDown Women's Championship, the group began appearing on SmackDown, thus Dominik began tormenting his dad again. After weeks of Rey refusing to attack Dominik, on the March 24 episode of SmackDown, Dominik disrespected Rey's mother and sister, forcing Rey to intervene and hit Dominik. It was then confirmed that Rey and Dominik would face each other at WrestleMania 39.

== Results ==
No.	Results	Stipulations	Times
1^{P}	Madcap Moss and The Street Profits (Angelo Dawkins and Montez Ford) defeated Austin Theory and Alpha Academy (Chad Gable and Otis) by pinfall	Six-man tag team match	6:29
2	Damage CTRL (Bayley, Dakota Kai, and Iyo Sky) defeated Bianca Belair, Alexa Bliss, and Asuka by pinfall	Six-woman tag team match	18:44
3	Gunther (c) (with Imperium (Ludwig Kaiser and Giovanni Vinci)) defeated Sheamus (with Ridge Holland and Butch) by pinfall	Singles match for the WWE Intercontinental Championship	19:33
4	Liv Morgan (c) defeated Shayna Baszler by pinfall	Singles match for the WWE SmackDown Women's Championship	11:02
5	Edge and Rey Mysterio (with Dominik Mysterio) defeated The Judgment Day (Finn Bálor and Damian Priest) (with Rhea Ripley) by pinfall	Tag team match	12:35
6	Seth "Freakin" Rollins defeated Matt Riddle by pinfall	Singles match	17:22
7	Roman Reigns (c) defeated Drew McIntyre by pinfall	Singles match for the Undisputed WWE Universal Championship (Note: The name "Undisputed WWE Universal Championship" referred to both the WWE Championship and Universal Championship being held and defended together, although both titles remained independently active.)	30:47
(c) / – the champion(s) heading into the match; P / – the match was broadcast on the pre-show

== See also ==
- 2022 in professional wrestling
- List of WWE pay-per-view and livestreaming supercards
