= Insurrextion (2001) =

World Wrestling Federation pay-per-view event

- VHS cover featuring various WWF wrestlers
- Promotion: World Wrestling Federation
- Date: May 5, 2001
- City: London, England
- Venue: Earls Court Exhibition Centre
- Attendance: 16,284

Pay-per-view chronology
← Previous; Backlash	Next → Judgment Day

Insurrextion chronology
← Previous; 2000	Next → 2002

WWE in Europe chronology
← Previous; Rebellion (2000)	Next → Rebellion (2001)

The 2001 Insurrextion was a professional wrestling pay-per-view (PPV) event produced by the American promotion World Wrestling Federation (WWF, now WWE) and broadcast exclusively in the United Kingdom. It was the second annual Insurrextion and took place on May 5, 2001, at the Earls Court Exhibition Centre in London, England for a second consecutive year. This was the final Insurrextion produced before the promotion introduced the brand extension in March 2002.

== Production ==
=== Background ===
In 1999, the American professional wrestling promotion World Wrestling Federation (WWF, now WWE) established an annual pay-per-view (PPV) event titled Rebellion, which was broadcast exclusively in the United Kingdom. In 2000, the WWF created a second UK-exclusive PPV titled Insurrextion. A second Insurrextion was then scheduled for Saturday, May 5, 2001, at the Earls Court Exhibition Centre in London, England, the same venue as the first event, thus establishing Insurrextion as one of the WWF's two annual UK-exclusive PPVs.

=== Storylines ===
The event featured seven professional wrestling matches, and two pre-show matches that involved different wrestlers from pre-existing scripted feuds, and storylines. Wrestlers portrayed villains, heroes, or less distinguishable characters in the scripted events that built tension, and culminated in a wrestling match or series of matches.

== Aftermath ==
The 2001 Insurrextion was the final Insurrextion produced before the promotion introduced the brand extension in March 2002, which divided the roster into two separate brands, Raw, and SmackDown!, where wrestlers were exclusively assigned to perform. The following year's event was subsequently a Raw-exclusive show.

== Reception ==
In January 2016, Kevin Pantoja of 411Mania gave the event a rating of 4.0 [Poor], writing "Another in a line of England only pay-per-views that isn't very good. Granted there are some things to check out. The Two out of Three Falls match rules, and the four-way tag was fun. However, everything else either disappointed greatly or just flat out sucked. Not the best way to spend two-and-a-half hours, but you should go see Angle/Benoit at least."

== Results ==
No.	Results	Stipulations	Times
1	Eddie Guerrero defeated Grand Master Sexay	Singles match	4:30
2	The Radicalz (Perry Saturn, Dean Malenko and Terri Runnels) defeated The Hollys (Crash Holly, Hardcore Holly and Molly Holly)	Six-person mixed tag team match	5:37
3	Bradshaw defeated Big Show	Singles match	3:20
4	Edge and Christian defeated The Dudley Boyz (Bubba Ray Dudley and D-Von Dudley), The Hardy Boyz (Matt Hardy and Jeff Hardy) and X-Factor (X-Pac and Justin Credible) (with Albert)	Four-Way Elimination match	13:20
5	Chris Benoit defeated Kurt Angle by 2–0: First fall: Benoit pinned Angle at 7:43 (1–0); Second fall: Benoit pinned Angle at 14:23 (2–0)	Two-out-of-three falls match	14:23
6	Chris Jericho defeated William Regal by submission	Singles match for the Queen's Cup	14:46
7	The Undertaker defeated The Two Man Power Trip ("Stone Cold" Steve Austin (c) and Triple H) (with Stephanie McMahon-Helmsley)	Handicap match for the WWF Championship; Undertaker could only win the title by pinning Austin.	17:12
(c) / – the champion(s) heading into the match

(*) Since Undertaker pinned Triple H, he did not win the title

== Other on-screen talent ==
Commentators

- Michael Cole
- Paul Heyman

Interviewer

- Jonathan Coachman

Ring announcer

- Lilian Garcia

Referees

- Earl Hebner
- Mike Sparks
- Teddy Long
- Tim White

== See also ==
- Professional wrestling in the United Kingdom
