= Money in the Bank (2023) =

WWE premium live event

- Promotional poster featuring Seth "Freakin" Rollins and various other WWE wrestlers, as well as London landmarks Elizabeth Tower and the Tower Bridge
- Promotion: WWE
- Brand(s): Raw; SmackDown
- Date: July 1, 2023
- City: London, England
- Venue: The O2 Arena
- Attendance: 18,885 (Note: WWE announced an attendance of 18,885. Distributed tickets (including complimentary tickets) was estimated at 17,617 with about 16,000 tickets sold.)

WWE event chronology
← Previous; NXT Battleground	Next → NXT The Great American Bash

Money in the Bank chronology
← Previous; 2022	Next → 2024

WWE in Europe chronology
← Previous; Clash at the Castle	Next → Backlash

The 2023 Money in the Bank was a professional wrestling premium live event (PLE) produced by the American company WWE, held for wrestlers from the promotion's main roster brands, Raw and SmackDown. It was the 14th annual Money in the Bank event and took place on Saturday, July 1, 2023, at The O2 Arena in London, England and aired live at 8:00 pm British Summer Time (3:00 p.m. Eastern Time). The event centered on the Money in the Bank ladder match, a multi-person ladder match where the wrestlers compete to retrieve a briefcase hanging above the ring which contains a contract for a guaranteed championship match at any time within the next year.

Seven matches were contested at the event. In the main event, which was SmackDown's main match, The Usos (Jey Uso and Jimmy Uso) defeated The Bloodline (Roman Reigns and Solo Sikoa) in a "Bloodline Civil War" tag team match. Jey pinned Reigns to win the match, which was the first time that Reigns was pinned since TLC: Tables, Ladders & Chairs in December 2019. Additionally, Raw's Damian Priest and SmackDown's Iyo Sky won the respective men's and women's Money in the Bank ladder matches. In other prominent matches, Seth "Freakin" Rollins defeated Finn Bálor to retain the World Heavyweight Championship, which was the main match from Raw, and Cody Rhodes defeated Dominik Mysterio. The event also saw surprise appearances by John Cena and Drew McIntyre, both appearing for the first time since WrestleMania 39 in April 2023.

This was the first Money in the Bank to be held outside of the United States as well as WWE's first PLE to be held in London since Insurrextion in May 2002 and England in general since Insurrextion in June 2003. It was also the first Money in the Bank to livestream on Disney+ in the Philippines and Binge in Australia.

== Production ==
=== Background ===
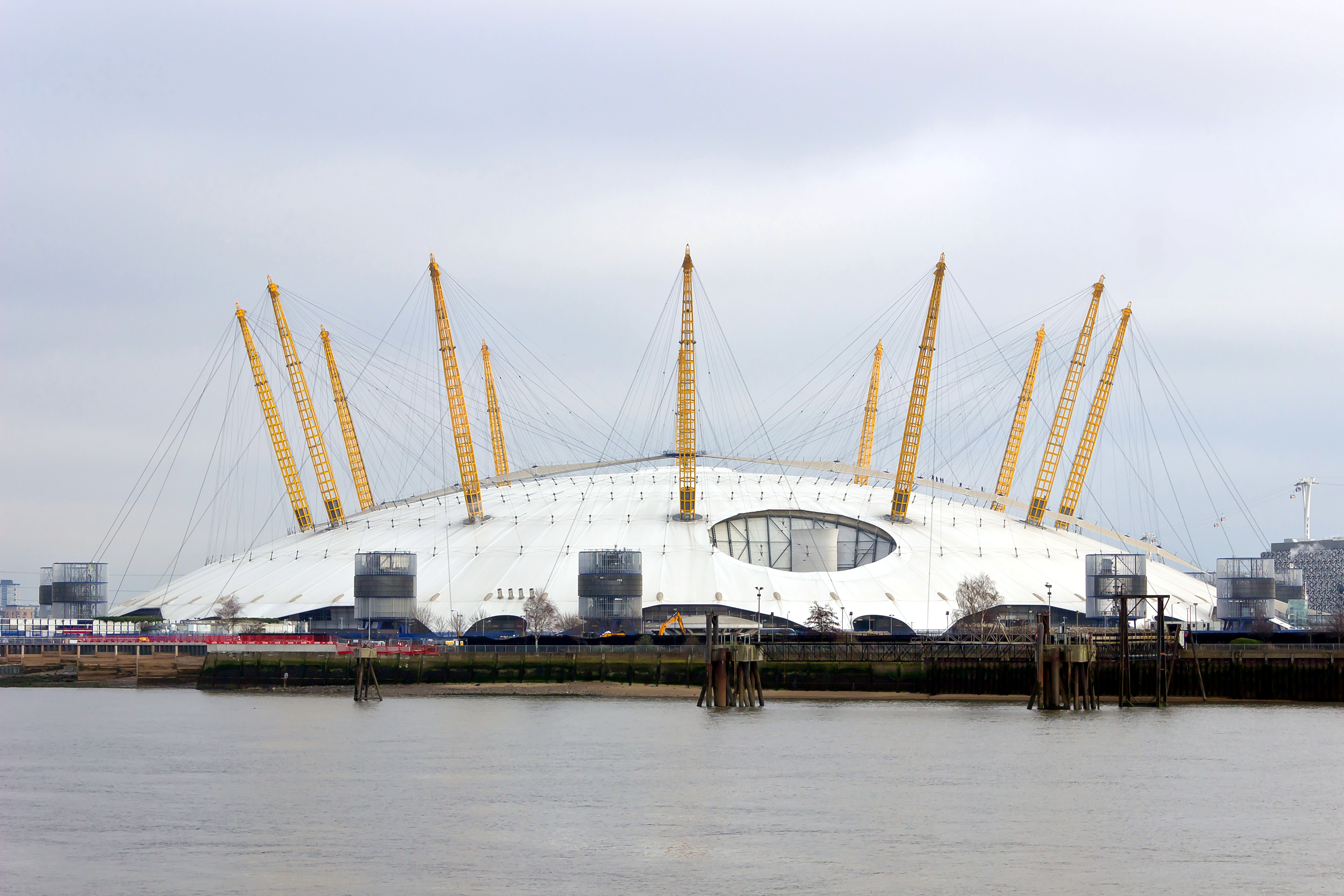
The 14th annual Money in the Bank event was held at The O2 Arena in London, England.

Money in the Bank is an annual professional wrestling premium live event (PLE) produced by the American company WWE since 2010, generally held between May and July. It was originally broadcast exclusively via pay-per-view (PPV) before it began simulcasting on WWE's livestreaming platforms in 2014. As of August 2021, it is considered one of the promotion's five biggest PLEs of the year, along with WrestleMania, SummerSlam, Royal Rumble, and Survivor Series, referred to as the "Big Five". The concept of the event comes from WWE's established Money in the Bank ladder match.

Following the success of Clash at the Castle in September 2022, which was held in Cardiff, Wales, WWE announced on January 5, 2023, that it would be returning to the United Kingdom for the 14th Money in the Bank event on Saturday, July 1, 2023, at The O2 Arena in London, England. This marked the first Money in the Bank event to be held outside of the United States. This was also WWE's first major event to be held in London since Insurrextion in May 2002 and England in general since Insurrextion in June 2003. It was also announced that the June 30 episode of Friday Night SmackDown would air live from the same venue, marking the first time for the show to broadcast live and in primetime from the UK at 8:00 pm local on BT Sport. Tickets for both events went on sale on February 24 with hospitality packages also available. It was reported that general admission tickets for Money in the Bank sold out in one minute.

The Money in the Bank ladder match features multiple wrestlers using ladders to retrieve a briefcase hanging above the ring. The briefcase contains a contract that guarantees the winner a match for a championship of their choosing at any time within the next year. The contract was originally for a world championship match, but beginning in 2022, it can be used on any championship. The 2023 event featured wrestlers from the Raw and SmackDown brand divisions and reduced the number of participants in both matches (previously eight): the men's had seven participants with three from Raw and SmackDown each and one WWE free agent, while the women's had six participants evenly divided between the brands.

=== Broadcast outlets ===
The PLE was available through traditional PPV outlets worldwide. It was also available to livestream on Peacock in the United States, SonyLIV in India, Disney+ Hotstar in Indonesia, Disney+ in the Philippines, Binge in Australia, and the WWE Network everywhere else. It was the first Money in the Bank to livestream on Disney+ in the Philippines, following the shutdown of its version of the WWE Network in November 2022, and it was also the first Money in the Bank to livestream on Binge in Australia after the Australian version of the WWE Network merged under Foxtel's channel Binge in January. With the event being held in London, England, it aired live at 8:00 pm British Summer Time (3:00 p.m. Eastern Time).

=== Storylines ===
The event included seven matches that resulted from scripted storylines. Results were predetermined by WWE's writers on the Raw and SmackDown brands, while storylines were produced on WWE's weekly television shows, Monday Night Raw and Friday Night SmackDown.

Qualifying matches for the men's Money in the Bank ladder match began on the May 29 episode of Raw. Ricochet and Shinsuke Nakamura became the first and second qualified entrants by defeating The Miz and Bronson Reed, respectively. LA Knight then qualified by defeating Montez Ford on the June 2 episode of SmackDown. The next qualifying matches occurred on the following week's SmackDown, where Santos Escobar and Butch qualified by defeating Mustafa Ali and Baron Corbin, respectively. Damian Priest then defeated Matt Riddle in the final qualifying match on the June 12 episode of Raw. On the following week's Raw, however, free agent Logan Paul—in his first appearance since Night 1 of WrestleMania 39—revealed that after talking with WWE executives, he would also be competing in the match.

Qualifying matches for the women's Money in the Bank ladder match began on the June 2 episode of SmackDown, with Zelina Vega defeating Lacey Evans to be the first qualified entrant. The next qualifying matches occurred on the June 5 episode of Raw, where Becky Lynch and Zoey Stark defeated Sonya Deville and Natalya, respectively. Damage CTRL's Bayley and Iyo Sky then qualified by defeating "Michin" Mia Yim and Shotzi, respectively, on the June 9 episode of SmackDown. The last qualifying match occurred on the June 19 episode of Raw, where Trish Stratus defeated Raquel Rodriguez by disqualification thanks to an accidental interference from Lynch. Additionally, on the June 30 episode of SmackDown, Shotzi faced Bayley in a match where if Shotzi had won, she would have taken Bayley's spot in the Money in the Bank ladder match; however, Bayley won to keep her spot.

On the June 5 episode of Raw, The Miz hosted a "Miz TV" segment with Cody Rhodes as the special guest. During the segment, Miz introduced Judgment Day's Dominik Mysterio and SmackDown Women's Champion Rhea Ripley as his other special guests where Dominik taunted Rhodes, stating that Rhodes was a bad father and that he should be home with his baby daughter. Rhodes then proclaimed that Dominik's father Rey Mysterio made some terrible mistakes, one of which was having Dominik as his son. Dominik then feigned leaving the ring, only to return and slap Rhodes in the face. The following week during a presentation in which Ripley's SmackDown Women's Championship became the Women's World Championship, Rhodes interrupted and challenged Dominik to a match at Money in the Bank, which Ripley accepted on his behalf.

On the May 8 episode of Raw, Seth "Freakin" Rollins defeated Finn Bálor in the semifinals of a tournament for the inaugural World Heavyweight Championship, which Rollins ultimately won at Night of Champions. On the next episode of Raw, Rollins was victorious in a tag team match against Judgment Day members Bálor and Damian Priest. This led to a title match the following week where Rollins retained against Priest. Following the match, Bálor and Rollins came face-to-face. On the June 12 episode, Bálor called out Rollins and recalled that at SummerSlam in 2016 when he defeated Rollins for the inaugural Universal Championship, Rollins injured him in the match, which caused him to vacate the title the following day and derailed his career. Bálor claimed that he would do the same to Rollins at Money in the Bank by taking away the World Heavyweight Championship from him. Rollins then accepted Bálor's challenge for his title at Money in the Bank.

In the main event of Night 1 of WrestleMania 39, The Usos (Jey Uso and Jimmy Uso) lost the Undisputed WWE Tag Team Championship and failed to regain them. The Bloodline (The Usos and Solo Sikoa) ended up winning a six-man tag team match at Backlash, although there was friction between Sikoa and The Usos. On the following SmackDown, Undisputed WWE Universal Champion Roman Reigns demanded that The Usos apologize for their loss and failure to regain the championships, and although Jimmy refused to apologize, Jey apologized on Jimmy's behalf. The Bloodline's special counsel Paul Heyman then announced that he was able to procure another tag team championship match for The Bloodline; however, instead of The Usos, it would be Reigns and Sikoa, which would take place at Night of Champions. At the event, The Usos interfered in the match and accidentally attacked Sikoa with a superkick. This infuriated Reigns and eventually lambasted and shoved both Usos around, however, Jimmy retaliated by attacking Reigns, after which, along with Jey, they retreated. Reigns and Sikoa would ultimately lose the match. On the next episode of SmackDown, during a celebration for Reigns's achievement of reaching 1,000 days as Universal Champion, The Usos interrupted. Jimmy stated that he did what he did at Night of Champions to protect his family, specifically his brother Jey. Jimmy seemingly convinced Sikoa to join them against Reigns and The Usos had apparently convinced Reigns that they should stay together as a family. Reigns then embraced Jimmy, however, Reigns rejected Jimmy's proposal, prompting Sikoa to attack Jimmy. On the next episode, Heyman tried to persuade Jey to stay in The Bloodline, while also getting him a United States Championship match. However, Jey said that if he stayed with The Bloodline, Heyman would have to leave. Then on the championship match, Jey lost after Jimmy unintentionally attacked him. On the next episode, Reigns said to Jey that Heyman was his special counsel, not Bloodline's, then Heyman would not leave. After Jey seemingly sidelined with Reigns, he turned on him, choosing to stay by Jimmy's side. On the June 17 episode of SmackDown LowDown, it was announced that The Usos would face Reigns and Sikoa at Money in the Bank in a "Bloodline Civil War" tag team match.

During Raquel Rodriguez and Liv Morgan's defense of the WWE Women's Tag Team Championship on the May 12 episode of SmackDown, Morgan legitimately injured her shoulder. On Raw the next week, Ronda Rousey and Shayna Baszler, in their first appearance since Night 2 of WrestleMania 39, attacked Rodriguez after her match, wanting a title match, regardless if Rodriguez defended it alone. However, on the May 19 episode of SmackDown, the championship was vacated because of Morgan's injury. A fatal four-way tag team match was scheduled for the May 29 episode of Raw to determine the new champions, where Rousey and Baszler won. On the June 23 episode of SmackDown, Rousey and Baszler defeated NXT Women's Tag Team Champions Alba Fyre and Isla Dawn to unify the championships. During the match, Rodriguez was watching at ringside. As she walked away, Rousey called her out and asked why she was there. She said that she wanted a rematch for the title before introducing the returning Morgan. They had a staredown before Rousey and Baszler left the ring. The next day on SmackDown LowDown, it was announced that Rousey and Baszler would defend the WWE Women's Tag Team Championship against Rodriguez and Morgan at Money in the Bank.

On the May 15 episode of Raw, Matt Riddle was competing in a battle royal to determine Gunther's next challenger for the Intercontinental Championship. During the match, by Gunther's order, his Imperium stablemates, Ludwig Kaiser and Giovanni Vinci, attacked Riddle, causing him to be eliminated. This led to a six-man tag team match the next week against Imperium, where Riddle's team won. Their rivalry continued through the next episodes, and on the June 12 episode of Raw, after Riddle's Money in the Bank qualifying match, he was attacked by Kaiser and Gunther, and later, Riddle tried to interfere in Gunther and Kaiser's Undisputed WWE Tag Team Championship match, costing both men the titles. On the next episode, after Riddle defeated Kaiser, Gunther and Kaiser attacked Riddle once again, almost (kayfabe) injuring his leg. On June 26, Riddle challenged Gunther to a match for his Intercontinental Championship at Money in the Bank, which Gunther accepted on that night's episode of Raw.

== Event ==
Other on-screen personnel
Role:	Name:
English commentators	Michael Cole
English commentators	Wade Barrett
Spanish commentators	Marcelo Rodriguez
Spanish commentators	Jerry Soto
Ring announcers	Mike Rome (SmackDown)
Ring announcers	Samantha Irvin (Raw)
Referees	Danilo Anfibio
Referees	Jason Ayers
Referees	Jessika Carr
Referees	Dan Engler
Referees	Daphanie LaShaunn
Referees	Chad Patton
Referees	Rod Zapata
Interviewer	Kayla Braxton
Pre-show panel	Jackie Redmond
Pre-show panel	Matt Camp
Pre-show panel	Peter Rosenberg

=== Preliminary matches ===
The PLE opened with the men's Money in the Bank ladder match, featuring Damian Priest, Ricochet, and Shinsuke Nakamura from Raw, LA Knight, Butch, and Santos Escobar from SmackDown, and Logan Paul. The match began with the other competitors attacking Paul and throwing him out of the ring. Paul quickly recovered, obtained a ladder and ascended it, however, Paul was thwarted by Nakamura. Escobar, Butch and Ricochet pinned Priest in the corner with a ladder and took turns attacking Priest. Paul set up a ladder and ascended it once again, however, the remaining participants thwarted Paul's attempts. Paul and Priest agreed to a temporary alliance and set up two tables at ringside, however, Priest ended the alliance quickly and attacked Paul. Paul recovered and attacked the other competitors. Butch applied a chinlock on Escobar while on a ladder, however, Ricochet performed a 450 splash on them. Butch then performed a Moonsault from a ladder onto the other competitors. In the end, Priest then fended off Escobar and Nakamura before performing a Broken Arrow from the top of the ladder on Knight and Priest unhooked the briefcase to win the match, and would hold on to it until WrestleMania.

Next, Ronda Rousey and Shayna Baszler defended the WWE Women's Tag Team Championship against Raquel Rodriguez and Liv Morgan. During the match, Baszler and Rousey dominated Morgan and Rodriguez. In the closing moments, Baszler turned on her own tag partner, Rousey, and applied the Kirifuda Clutch on her before leaving. Rodriguez and Morgan then performed the Tejana Bomb/Oblivion combo on Rousey to regain the title for a second time.

After that, Gunther defended Raw's Intercontinental Championship against Matt Riddle. During the match, Riddle landed on his feet during a German Suplex attempt, only to tweak his ankle. Riddle performed a Floating Bro on Gunther for a nearfall. Gunther performed a Tenryu Powerbomb for a nearfall. In the closing moments, Gunther then applied a half crab on Riddle's injured ankle, followed by a leglock to force Riddle to submit to retain the title. Following the match, Drew McIntyre made his return in his first appearance since Night 2 of WrestleMania 39, and his first appearance since being drafted to Raw. After a brief staredown, Gunther shoved McIntyre, only for McIntyre to respond with a Claymore Kick on Gunther, after which, McIntyre taunted Gunther with the Intercontinental Championship belt.

In the fourth match, Cody Rhodes took on Dominik Mysterio (accompanied by Rhea Ripley). At the start of the match, Mysterio repeatedly slapped Rhodes, however, he retreated every time Rhodes wanted to attack Mysterio. Mysterio then tried to escape to the backstage area, however, Rhodes caught Mysterio and threw him back to the ring. Mysterio also tried to escape into the crowd, only for Rhodes to thwart his attempts again. After Rhodes was momentarily distracted by Ripley, the referee did not notice Mysterio removing the turnbuckle. Ripley then shoved Rhodes into the exposed turnbuckle and Mysterio began to take control on Rhodes. Rhodes performed a Disaster Kick on Mysterio for a nearfall. In the closing moments, after Ripley distracted Rhodes. Mysterio set Rhodes up for a 619 attempt, however, Rhodes countered with an Alabama Slam, a Cody Cutter and Cross Rhodes to win the match.

Next, John Cena, in his first appearance since Night 1 of WrestleMania 39, made a surprise appearance. Cena praised the crowd and then stated that London should host WrestleMania in the future. Cena then was interrupted by Grayson Waller, who stated that WrestleMania should take place in his own home country, Australia. Waller then taunted Cena about his previous losses and pitched the greatest "Grayson Waller Effect" at WrestleMania with Cena as the special guest. Waller then attacked Cena from behind, however, Cena performed an Attitude Adjustment on Waller to end the segment.

After that, the women's Money in the Bank ladder match took place, featuring Becky Lynch, Trish Stratus, and Zoey Stark from Raw and Bayley, Iyo Sky, and Zelina Vega from SmackDown. Sky and Bayley ascended opposite sides of a ladder when Lynch tipped it over. Lynch then fended off Stark before Stratus headscissored Lynch into the corner. Lynch and Sky were able to momentarily subdue Stratus, and Vega managed to use Stratus as a bridge between two ladders to climb the taller one. Sky performed a Moonsault off the ladder onto the other women. Vega leaped off a ladder onto Lynch. Stark and Stratus decided to double-team Lynch and place a handcuff on one of her wrists, but Lynch cleared the announce table and sent Stratus over it. Lynch then placed a ladder as a bridge between the ring apron and the announce table and performed a Manhandle Slam on Stratus onto the ladder. Stark followed up with a Neckbreaker on Lynch. Stark and Vega climbed opposite sides of the ladder, with Vega getting the upper hand after performing Code Red on Stark onto a bridged ladder. As Sky ascended the ladder, Bayley tipped it over. Bayley ascended the ladder, but Lynch used the handcuffs to knock Bayley down. As Lynch was closing in on the win, Sky knocked her down and handcuffed Lynch and Bayley's wrists together between the ladder's steps. Sky then retrieved the briefcase to win the match.

In the penultimate match, Seth "Freakin" Rollins defended Raw's World Heavyweight Championship against Finn Bálor. During the match, Bálor attempted a Coup de Grâce, but Rollins avoided it and rolled up Bálor for a nearfall. Rollins performed a Pedigree on Bálor for another nearfall, after which, Damian Priest made his way to the ring with his Money in the Bank briefcase. As Rollins was focusing on Priest, Bálor sent Rollins into the barricade with a dropkick, and followed up with two Coup de Grâces, first from the announce table and the second from the steel steps. As Bálor set up for a third in the ring, Priest stood up as if he was going to cash in his contract, which distracted Bálor, allowing Rollins to perform The Stomp on Bálor to retain the title.

=== Main event ===
In the main event, The Bloodline (Roman Reigns and Solo Sikoa, accompanied by Paul Heyman) faced The Usos (Jey Uso and Jimmy Uso) in a Bloodline Civil War tag team match. Sikoa overpowered Jimmy, but The Usos mounted in some offense. Sikoa then tagged Reigns in. Reigns and Jey then circled each other with Reigns getting the upper hand. Later on, Jey performed a suicide dive on Sikoa and attempted another, but Reigns punched him out of mid-air. Reigns followed up with a Superman Punch and played to the crowd, but Jimmy tagged himself in and The Usos performed a Double Spear on Reigns, but the pin was broken up by Sikoa. Jey sent Sikoa into the ring post and Reigns performed a Superman Punch on Jimmy for a nearfall. Jimmy performed two Superkicks on Reigns and went for the Uso Splash, but Reigns countered into the Guillotine. Reigns intercepted a Jimmy superkick, but Jimmy sent Reigns into the referee, knocking him out. The Usos then performed the 1D on Reigns, but the referee was unable to make the count. As The Usos ascended the turnbuckles, Reigns and Sikoa gave them stereo Uranages. Sikoa then performed the Samoan Spike on Jimmy, and Reigns performed a Spear on Jey before Sikoa did the same. As they stacked Jimmy on Jey, the referee recovered, but The Usos kicked out.

Sikoa then performed a Superkick on Jimmy onto the announce desk and attempted a Frog Splash through it, but Jimmy moved out of the way. Back in the ring, Jey performed a Superkick on Reigns, who followed up with a Spear on Jey for a nearfall. During the kickout, Jey performed a low blow on Reigns which the referee did not see, which Reigns used to do. The Usos then performed Superkicks on Reigns and Sikoa and finally, Jey performed a Frog Splash on Reigns and pinned him to win the match. This marked Reigns's first pinfall loss since TLC: Tables, Ladders & Chairs in December 2019.

== Reception ==
As with WWE's other PPVs in 2023, Money in the Bank received positive reviews from critics and fans. The event itself was the highest grossing arena event in WWE history at the time.

Dave Meltzer gave his opinions of each match through his well-known star ratings. The Bloodline Civil War tag team match and the Men's Money In The Bank Ladder Match both received 4.5 stars, the highest-rated matches of the night. The Women's Money In The Bank Ladder match got 4 stars, the highest-rated Women's MITB Ladder match since 2018. Both the Intercontinental and Women's Tag Team Championship matches were rated 2.75 stars, the lowest-rated matches of the night. Cody Rhodes vs Dominik Mysterio was rated 3 stars. Finally, the World Heavyweight Championship match was rated 3.5 stars.

== Aftermath ==
=== Raw ===
On the following episode of Raw, World Heavyweight Champion Seth "Freakin" Rollins talked about his plans for SummerSlam when The Judgment Day (Damian Priest, Rhea Ripley, and Dominik Mysterio) interrupted. This led to a match between Mysterio and Rollins which the latter won via disqualification after interference from Priest. After the match, Priest attempted to cash in his Money in the Bank briefcase, but Finn Bálor appeared to attack Rollins. Bálor and Priest argued with each other while Rollins laid out Mysterio. The following week, arguments between Bálor and Priest ensued, but later, they both agreed that Bálor should receive a title match first. Later that night, The Judgment Day defeated Rollins' team in a six-man tag team match. On the July 17 episode, another championship match between Rollins and Bálor was made official for SummerSlam. Rollins would continue as champion until Night 2 of WrestleMania XL on April 7, 2024, where he lost the title to Drew McIntyre. After the match, CM Punk attacked McIntyre, allowing Priest to cash in the contract and win the title.

After Money in the Bank, Logan Paul attacked Ricochet backstage for costing him the Money in the Bank ladder match. Ricochet then invited Paul to meet him face-to-face on the July 10 episode of Raw where he challenged Paul to a match at SummerSlam, but Paul denied. Paul once again accepted Ricochet's invitation to meet him on the July 24 episode where Paul attacked Ricochet from behind and then accepted his challenge to a match at SummerSlam.

Drew McIntyre continued to feud with Imperium (Gunther, Ludwig Kaiser, and Giovanni Vinci) over the next few weeks, including defeating Kaiser and Vinci in a tag team match on the July 10 episode of Raw. On the next episode after Gunther's match, he called out McIntyre, with a face-to-face between the two being scheduled for the next episode. There, McIntyre challenged Gunther to a match for his championship that night, however, Gunther declined, but said that he would defend it against McIntyre at SummerSlam, which was made official.

Also on the following episode of Raw, Ronda Rousey called out Shayna Baszler, who said that she was responsible for bringing Rousey into WWE, and while she had to work her way through the WWE system, beginning in NXT, Rousey skipped the process and had her debut match at WrestleMania 34. Baszler then said that she was the one who could finally shut her up, and then they brawled with each other. They once again brawled the next week, and on the July 17 episode, Baszler challenged Rousey to come to the ring, however, she declined, and said that she would fight her at SummerSlam. The following week, both agreed to fight at SummerSlam, which was later confirmed. On the final Raw before SummerSlam, it was announced that the match would be a Mixed Martial Arts (MMA) Rules match.

=== SmackDown ===
On the following SmackDown, a trial for Undisputed WWE Universal Champion Roman Reigns was held. Reigns feigned not wanting to be the Tribal Chief any longer and hit Jey Uso with a low blow. Jimmy Uso then attacked Reigns until Solo Sikoa tossed him away and then both Sikoa and Reigns brutally attacked him, resulting in Jimmy being taken to a hospital. Later that night, Jey viciously attacked Reigns and Sikoa with a steel chair before challenging Reigns for the Undisputed WWE Universal Championship. The following week, Jey talked about his family's relationship with one another before being interrupted by Sikoa and Reigns' special counsel Paul Heyman, who said that Reigns would meet Jey the following week to discuss the "rules of engagement". There, it was agreed that Reigns would defend the Undisputed WWE Universal Championship against Jey in an anything goes match called Tribal Combat, where in addition to the championship, the winner would be recognized as the Tribal Chief of the Anoaʻi family. At the event, Reigns retained after Jimmy turned on Jey.

At SummerSlam, Iyo Sky cashed in the Money in the Bank briefcase on Bianca Belair after the latter won the WWE Women's Championship and defeated her to win the title for the first time.

== Results ==
No.	Results	Stipulations	Times
1	Damian Priest defeated Butch, LA Knight, Logan Paul, Ricochet, Santos Escobar, and Shinsuke Nakamura by retrieving the briefcase	Money in the Bank ladder match for a men's championship match contract	20:25
2	Liv Morgan and Raquel Rodriguez defeated Ronda Rousey and Shayna Baszler (c) by pinfall	Tag team match for the WWE Women's Tag Team Championship	9:00
3	Gunther (c) defeated Matt Riddle by submission	Singles match for the WWE Intercontinental Championship	7:45
4	Cody Rhodes defeated Dominik Mysterio (with Rhea Ripley) by pinfall	Singles match	8:40
5	Iyo Sky defeated Bayley, Becky Lynch, Trish Stratus, Zelina Vega, and Zoey Stark by retrieving the briefcase	Money in the Bank ladder match for a women's championship match contract	18:05
6	Seth "Freakin" Rollins (c) defeated Finn Bálor by pinfall	Singles match for the World Heavyweight Championship	12:30
7	The Usos (Jey Uso and Jimmy Uso) defeated The Bloodline (Roman Reigns and Solo Sikoa) (with Paul Heyman) by pinfall	Tag team match	32:10
(c) / – the champion(s) heading into the match
