= WWE Insurrextion =

World Wrestling Entertainment pay-per-view event series

- WWF Insurrextion logo
- Promotion: World Wrestling Entertainment
- Brand: Raw (2002–2003)
- First event: 2000
- Last event: 2003

WWE Insurrextion was an annual professional wrestling pay-per-view (PPV) event that was produced by World Wrestling Entertainment (WWE), an American professional wrestling promotion. Established in 2000, the events were held and broadcast exclusively in the United Kingdom. The first three events were held when the promotion was still called the World Wrestling Federation (WWF) with the 2002 event being the promotion's very last PPV held under the WWF name. Insurrextion also aired on Viewers Choice pay-per-view in Canada, while the 2002 and 2003 editions also aired in the United States on tape delay as part of the WWE Fanatic Series, a pay-per-view "best of" program.

To coincide with the brand extension, the events in 2002 and 2003 were Raw-exclusive shows, with the 2002 event being the promotion's first Raw-exclusive PPV. Following the 2003 event, all United Kingdom-exclusive PPVs were discontinued as WWE started to broadcast Raw and SmackDown! from the United Kingdom in 2004. Triple H was featured in the main event of all four editions of the PPV.

The 2002 event is also associated with the infamous "plane ride from hell" incident, which occurred during the flight back to the United States after the PPV.

== History ==
In 1999, the American professional wrestling promotion World Wrestling Federation (WWF, now WWE) ran two pay-per-views (PPV) in, and broadcast exclusively for, the United Kingdom. The first was No Mercy, which was held in May, and the second was Rebellion in October; the No Mercy name was later used for another PPV held in the United States that same month, which became a mainstay on WWF's PPV calendar. In early 2000, the promotion announced that May's United Kingdom-exclusive event would be titled Insurrextion. It was scheduled to be held on May 6, 2000, at the Earls Court Exhibition Centre in London, England. Like Rebellion, Insurrextion was established as a series of annual pay-per-views to be held exclusively in the United Kingdom.

The 2002 event was the promotion's final PPV event held under the WWF name, as just two days after the event, the promotion was renamed to World Wrestling Entertainment (WWE), with the 2003 event being the only Insurrextion held under the WWE name. The 2003 event was the final Insurrextion as all United Kingdom-exclusive pay-per-views were discontinued as WWE started to broadcast Raw and SmackDown! from the United Kingdom in 2004.

To coincide with the brand extension introduced in March 2002, in which the promotion divided its roster into two separate brands, Raw and SmackDown!, where wrestlers were exclusively assigned to perform, the 2002 and 2003 events were held exclusively for the Raw brand. The 2002 event was also WWE's first Raw-exclusive PPV held.

== Events ==
Raw-branded event

#	Event	Date	City	Venue	Main event	Ref.
1	Insurrextion (2000)	May 6, 2000	London, England	Earls Court	The Rock (c) vs. Shane McMahon vs. Triple H in a triple threat match for the WWF Championship	
2	Insurrextion (2001)	May 5, 2001	London, England	Earls Court	The Two Man Power Trip (Stone Cold Steve Austin (c) and Triple H) vs. The Undertaker in a Handicap match for the WWF Championship	
3	Insurrextion (2002)	May 4, 2002	London, England	Wembley Arena	Triple H vs. The Undertaker	
4	Insurrextion (2003)	June 7, 2003	Newcastle, England	Telewest Arena	Triple H (c) vs. Kevin Nash in a Street Fight match for the World Heavyweight Championship	
(c) – refers to the champion(s) heading into the match

== See also ==
- Professional wrestling in the United Kingdom
