= Insurrextion (2002) =

World Wrestling Federation pay-per-view event

- DVD cover featuring Triple H, Trish Stratus, The Undertaker, and "Stone Cold" Steve Austin. The DVD cover featured the WWE name and logo instead of the WWF name and logo as it was released after the company rebranded to WWE.
- Promotion: World Wrestling Federation
- Brand: Raw
- Date: May 4, 2002
- City: London, England
- Venue: Wembley Arena
- Attendance: 9,308

Pay-per-view chronology
← Previous; Backlash	Next → Judgment Day

Insurrextion chronology
← Previous; 2001	Next → 2003

WWE in Europe chronology
← Previous; Rebellion (2001)	Next → Rebellion (2002)

The 2002 Insurrextion was a professional wrestling pay-per-view (PPV) event produced by the American promotion World Wrestling Federation (WWF, now WWE) and broadcast exclusively in the United Kingdom. It was the third annual Insurrextion and took place on May 4, 2002, at the Wembley Arena in London, England, held exclusively for wrestlers from the promotion's Raw brand division.

This was the company's first-ever brand-exclusive PPV event, after the introduction of the brand extension in March. This was also the last televised event under the WWF name, as the company abandoned their "WWF" trademark dispute with the World Wide Fund for Nature (WWF) on May 6, 2002. On that night's episode of Raw, the company introduced its new name of World Wrestling Entertainment (WWE). This was also the company's last PPV to be held in London until Money in the Bank in 2023.

In addition, a series of notorious incidents occurred on the return flight to the United States, which has been referred to as the "plane ride from hell". Wrestlers Scott Hall and Curt Hennig were fired following the event for their involvement in the incidents, while Goldust and Ric Flair were also reprimanded by the company for their involvement in other incidents during the flight.

== Production ==
=== Background ===
Insurrextion was an annual professional wrestling pay-per-view (PPV) event produced by the American promotion World Wrestling Federation (WWF, now WWE) since 2000 and broadcast exclusively in the United Kingdom. It was one of two annual UK-exclusive PPVs, along with Rebellion. The third Insurrextion was held on Saturday, May 4, 2002, at the Wembley Arena in London, England.

This was the first Insurrextion produced after the brand extension was introduced in March, which divided the roster into two separate brands, Raw and SmackDown!, where wrestlers were exclusively assigned to perform. The 2002 event was in turn made exclusive to wrestlers of the Raw brand, which was the promotion's first-ever brand-exclusive PPV produced, as the prior PPV, Backlash, which was the first PPV held after the brand split was introduced, featured wrestlers from both brands.

=== Storylines ===
The event featured nine professional wrestling matches and two pre-show matches that involved different wrestlers from pre-existing scripted feuds and storylines.

== Aftermath ==
The 2002 Insurrextion was the final PPV produced under the WWF name as the company was renamed to World Wrestling Entertainment (WWE) just two days after the event. This name change came as a result of a lawsuit from the World Wildlife Fund over the "WWF" initialism. This would also be the company's last PPV held in London until Money in the Bank in 2023.

=== "The Plane Ride from Hell" ===
During the flight back to the United States, a series of incidents occurred that has been referred to as the "plane ride from hell", which has been described as one of professional wrestling's most infamous scandals.

The Boeing 757 plane that was chartered included an open bar, and many of the wrestlers indulged. Incidents included physical altercations and the sexual harassment of two female flight attendants, Taralyn Cappellano and Heidi Doyle. Scott Hall had a history of alcoholism. Although he did not have a match at the PPV, he did interfere in a match and he did perform at the house shows during this UK tour. In addition to pranking other wrestlers with shaving cream, he said sexually vulgar things to Doyle before passing out. Curt Hennig, known for being a prankster, also pranked wrestlers with the shaving cream, including Brock Lesnar, which resulted in a fight between the two. Goldust also said vulgar things to Cappellano, and later got on the public address system and started to sing a song for his ex-wife and fellow wrestler, Terri Runnels, who was also on the plane. Cappellano and Doyle both alleged that Ric Flair had exposed himself to them and grabbed their hands and made them touch his genitals; Flair, however, denied the accusations.

Both Hall and Hennig were fired following the event, while Goldust and Flair were reprimanded by the company. A 2004 lawsuit was filed by both Cappellano and Doyle, although WWE settled out of court with both women. Season 3, Episode 8 of Vice's Dark Side of the Ring series covered the incident, which aired in September 2021.

== Results ==
No.	Results	Stipulations	Times
1^{D}	Mr. Perfect defeated Goldust	Singles match	—
2	Rob Van Dam defeated Eddie Guerrero (c) via disqualification	Singles match for the WWF Intercontinental Championship	11:24
3	Trish Stratus and Jacqueline defeated Molly Holly and Jazz	Tag team match	7:40
4	X-Pac defeated Bradshaw	Singles match	8:46
5	Booker T defeated Steven Richards (c) (Note: Following the match, Crash Holly (who was not involved in the original match) pinned Booker T, who later pinned Crash to regain the title; Richards later pinned Booker to return the title to himself.)	Hardcore match for the WWF Hardcore Championship	10:48
6	The Hardy Boyz (Matt Hardy and Jeff Hardy) defeated Brock Lesnar and Shawn Stasiak (with Paul Heyman)	Tag team match	6:42
7	Spike Dudley (c) defeated William Regal	Singles match for the WWF European Championship	4:56
8	"Stone Cold" Steve Austin defeated Big Show	Singles match Ric Flair was the special guest referee	15:00
9	Triple H defeated The Undertaker	Singles match	14:31
(c) / – the champion(s) heading into the match; D / – this was a dark match

== Other on-screen talent ==
Commentators

- Jim Ross
- Jerry Lawler

Interviewers

- Terri Runnels
- Lilian Garcia

Ring announcer

- Howard Finkel

Referees

- Chad Patton
- Jack Doan
- Nick Patrick
- Jimmy Korderas
- Earl Hebner

== See also ==
- Professional wrestling in the United Kingdom
