= Bayley (wrestler) =

American professional wrestler (born 1989)

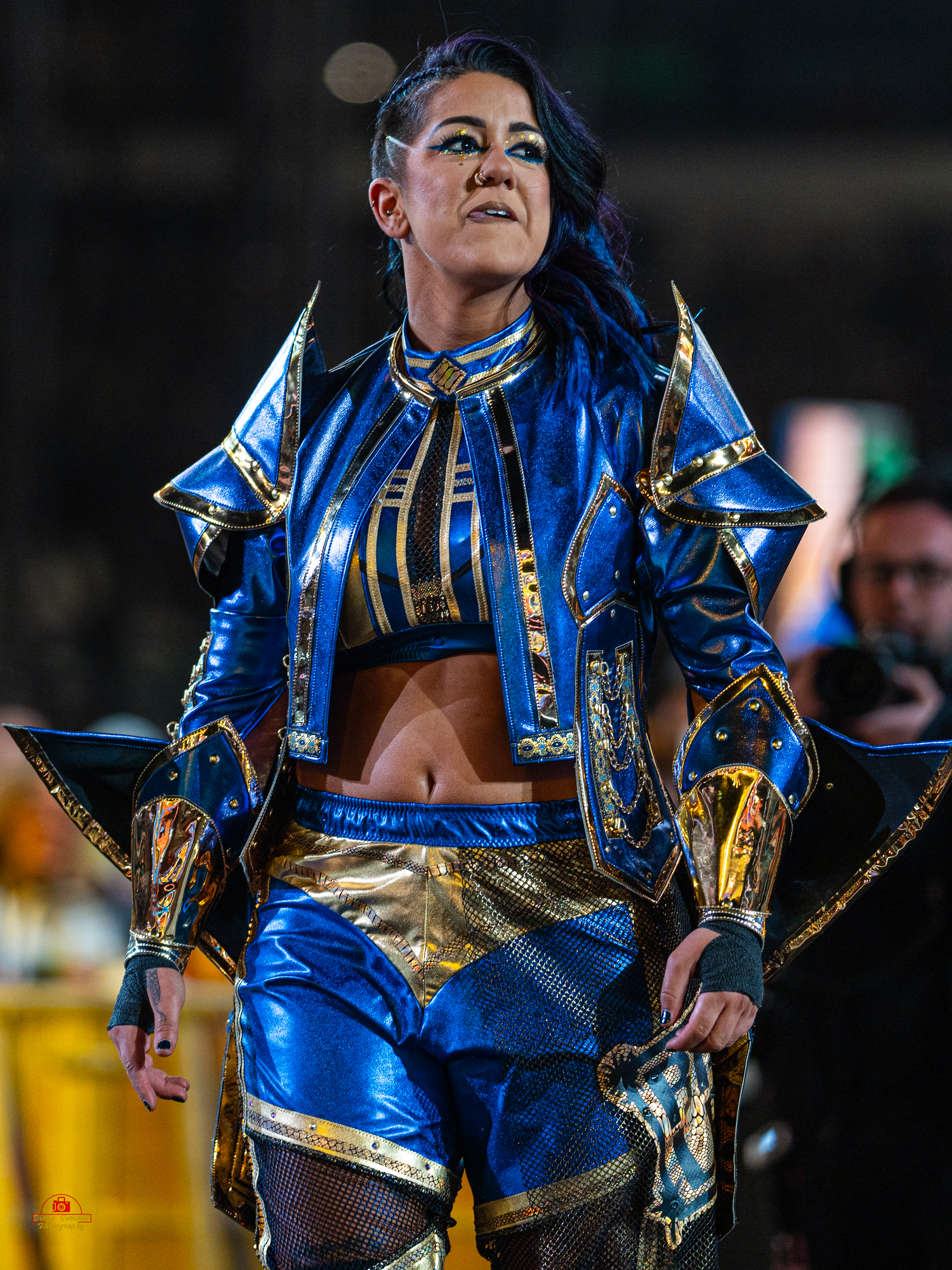
- Bayley in 2024

Personal information
- Born: Pamela Rose Martinez; June 15, 1989 (age 37) San Jose, California, U.S.

Professional wrestling career
- Ring name(s): Bayley; Davina Rose
- Billed height: 5 ft 6 in (168 cm)
- Billed weight: 119 lb (54 kg)
- Billed from: San Jose, California
- Trained by: Jason Styles; Sara Del Rey; WWE Performance Center
- Debut: September 19, 2008

Pamela Rose Martinez (born June 15, 1989) is an American professional wrestler. She has been signed to WWE since December 2012, where she performs on the Raw brand under the ring name Bayley.

From 2008 to 2012, she wrestled on the independent circuit under the ring name Davina Rose. Martinez signed with WWE in 2012 and was assigned to the NXT brand, where she adopted the ring name Bayley. In 2015, she won the NXT Women's Championship. On the main roster, she has held the WWE (Raw) Women's Championship (Note: During her first reign, the title was known as the Raw Women's Championship. By the time of her second reign, it had been renamed as WWE Women's Championship.) twice, the WWE SmackDown Women's Championship twice; her second reign of 380 days with the title is tied with Rhea Ripley as the longest in the championship's history, She also won the WWE Women's Tag Team Championship twice with Sasha Banks, of which they were the inaugural holders, making her WWE's first women's Triple Crown and Grand Slam champion. Additionally, she won the 2019 Money in the Bank ladder match and the 2024 Royal Rumble.

== Early life ==
Pamela Rose Martinez was born on June 15, 1989 in San Jose, California, and grew up in a Mexican-American family. She attended Independence High School in San Jose and once played as a captain of the school's basketball team, as well as participating in track and martial arts.

== Professional wrestling career ==
=== Independent circuit (2008–2012) ===
Martinez had been attending shows by Big Time Wrestling, a professional wrestling promotion in Northern California, since the age of 11. In April 2008, she started her professional wrestling career at the age of 18, by attending Big Time Wrestling's training classes by her head trainer Jason Styles, which was one of the reasons why Martinez considered Big Time Wrestling as her home promotion. She had her first match in October 2008. On the American independent circuit, Martinez wrestled under the ring name Davina Rose. Rose wrestled for Big Time Wrestling from 2008 to 2012. Between 2011 and 2012, Rose branched out to wrestle for other promotions such as NWA Championship Wrestling from Hollywood, Pro Wrestling Destination and Shine Wrestling.

In October 2010, Rose first met her mentor Serena when they teamed together for a tag team match. In October 2011, Rose made her debut for Shimmer Women Athletes. At the tapings of Shimmer Volume 41–44, she became embroiled in Serena's feud with the Canadian Ninjas (Portia Perez and Nicole Matthews). At the tapings, Rose lost all four matches, including her debut match against Mercedes Martinez. In 2012, on Volumes 51 and 52, Rose picked up her first two singles victories over Cherry Bomb and Rhia O'Reilly.

=== WWE ===
==== Early NXT appearances (2012–2015) ====
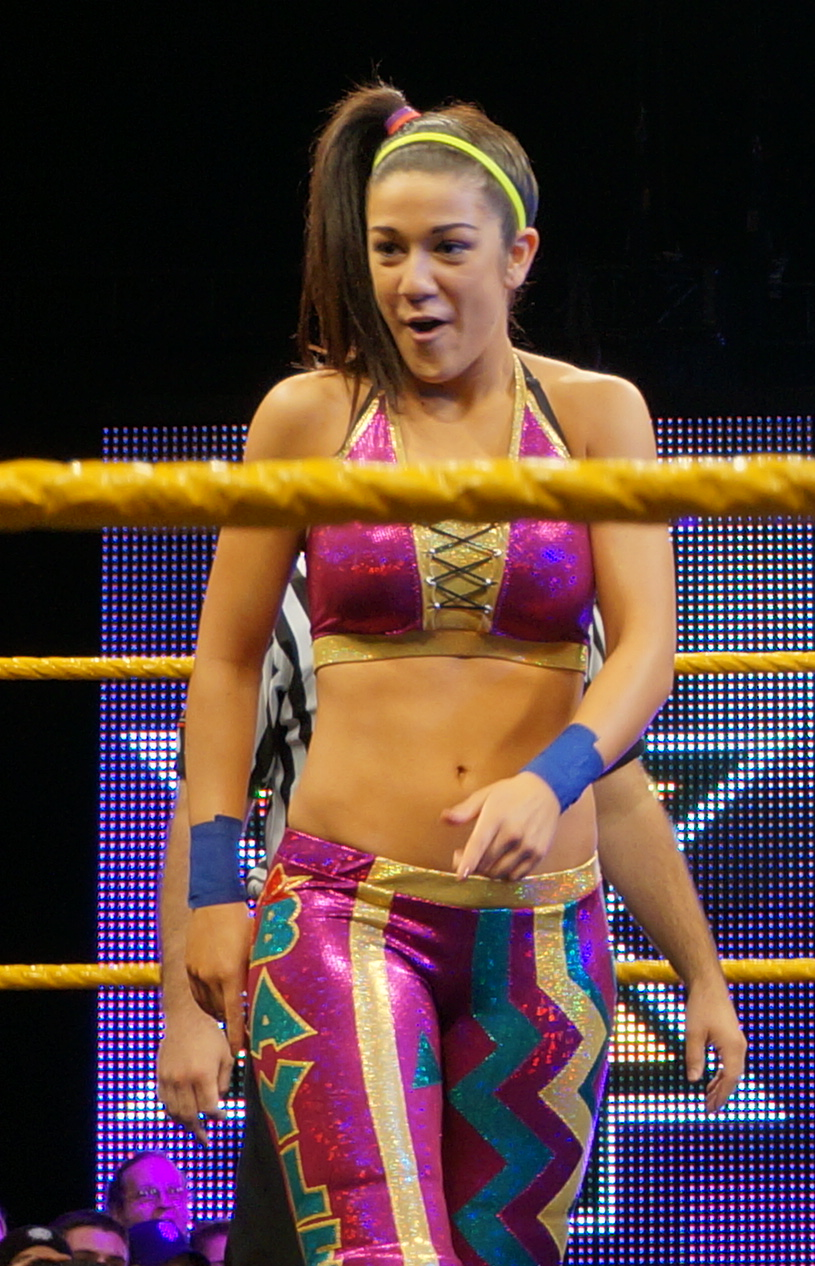
Bayley in April 2014

In December 2012, Martinez signed with WWE. In January 2013, Martinez made her debut for WWE's developmental territory NXT at a live event, wrestling under a mask as Luchadora for one match, teaming with Paige and Charlotte to defeat Summer Rae, Audrey Marie and Emma in a six-woman tag team match. She adopted the ring name Bayley and made her NXT television debut on the March 20 episode in a loss to Paige. On June 12, Bayley adopted a new character of a doe-eyed fangirl, losing to Alicia Fox in the first round of the NXT Women's Championship tournament to crown the inaugural champion. On August 21, Bayley unsuccessfully challenged AJ Lee for the Divas Championship. On September 4, for her first win, Bayley and Charlotte defeated Alicia Fox and Aksana. To Charlotte's annoyance, The BFFs—Beautiful, Fierce Females (Sasha Banks and Summer Rae) attempted to convince Bayley to join them, but this led to Charlotte attacking Bayley during their match against the BFFs on November 13, promptly joining the BFFs instead.

On May 1, 2014, Bayley failed to advance in a tournament for the vacant NXT Women's Championship after losing to Banks in the first round. After pinning Charlotte in a tag team match, Bayley defeated Banks to become the number one contender to Charlotte's NXT Women's Championship, but she was unsuccessful in capturing the title at NXT TakeOver: Fatal 4-Way on September 11 and in a rematch on October 2. In mid-October, after losing to Banks, Bayley was attacked by her former friend Becky Lynch, who allied with Banks, and she formed an alliance with former rival Charlotte to feud with Banks and Lynch throughout the following weeks. On the November 27 episode, Bayley was attacked by Banks and Lynch, injuring her knee in the storyline. She returned on the January 21, 2015, episode, saving Charlotte from an attack by Banks and Lynch, before reluctantly attacking Charlotte herself, leading to a fatal four-way match for the NXT Women's Championship at NXT TakeOver: Rival on February 11, where Bayley failed to capture the title.

==== NXT Women's Champion (2015–2016) ====
In March, Bayley began a feud with Emma after Emma criticized Bayley for her niceness, claiming it had prevented her from winning the NXT Women's Championship. On the April 1 episode, Bayley defeated Emma. On the April 29 episode, Bayley was defeated by Dana Brooke after a distraction by Emma. At NXT TakeOver: Unstoppable on May 20, Bayley and Charlotte defeated Emma and Brooke. On the May 27 episode, Bayley lost to Emma; she and Charlotte were attacked by her and Brooke after the match. After a short hiatus due to a broken hand injury, Bayley returned on the July 22 episode, defeating Emma and setting her sights on the NXT Women's Championship, thus ending their feud.

In August, after defeating Charlotte, Bayley defeated Becky Lynch to become the number one contender for the NXT Women's Championship. At NXT TakeOver: Brooklyn on August 22, Bayley defeated Sasha Banks to win the NXT Women's Championship, celebrating with her, Lynch and Charlotte after the match. In a rematch between the two, contested in the main event of NXT TakeOver: Respect on October 7, in the first ever women's 30-minute Iron Man match in WWE history, Bayley defeated Banks with three falls to two after securing the third fall with three seconds left in the match to retain the title. Throughout her championship reign, Bayley went on to fend off title contenders such as Alexa Bliss, Eva Marie, Nia Jax (at NXT TakeOver: London on December 16) and Carmella.

On the March 16, 2016, episode of NXT, after Bayley and Asuka won a tag team match, NXT general manager William Regal announced that Bayley would defend her championship against Asuka at NXT TakeOver: Dallas. At the event on April 1, Bayley lost the championship to Asuka, ending her reign at 223 days. On the May 18 episode, Bayley was challenged by Jax to a match which she lost. After being replaced by Jax at NXT TakeOver: The End on June 8 due to a storyline injury which made her unable to compete in a rematch for the NXT Women's Championship against Asuka, Bayley made her return on June 22, defeating Deonna Purrazzo. In July, Bayley was granted a rematch against Asuka for the NXT Women's Championship at NXT TakeOver: Brooklyn II on August 20, where she failed to regain the title in what was her final match in NXT.

==== Raw Women's Champion (2016–2017) ====
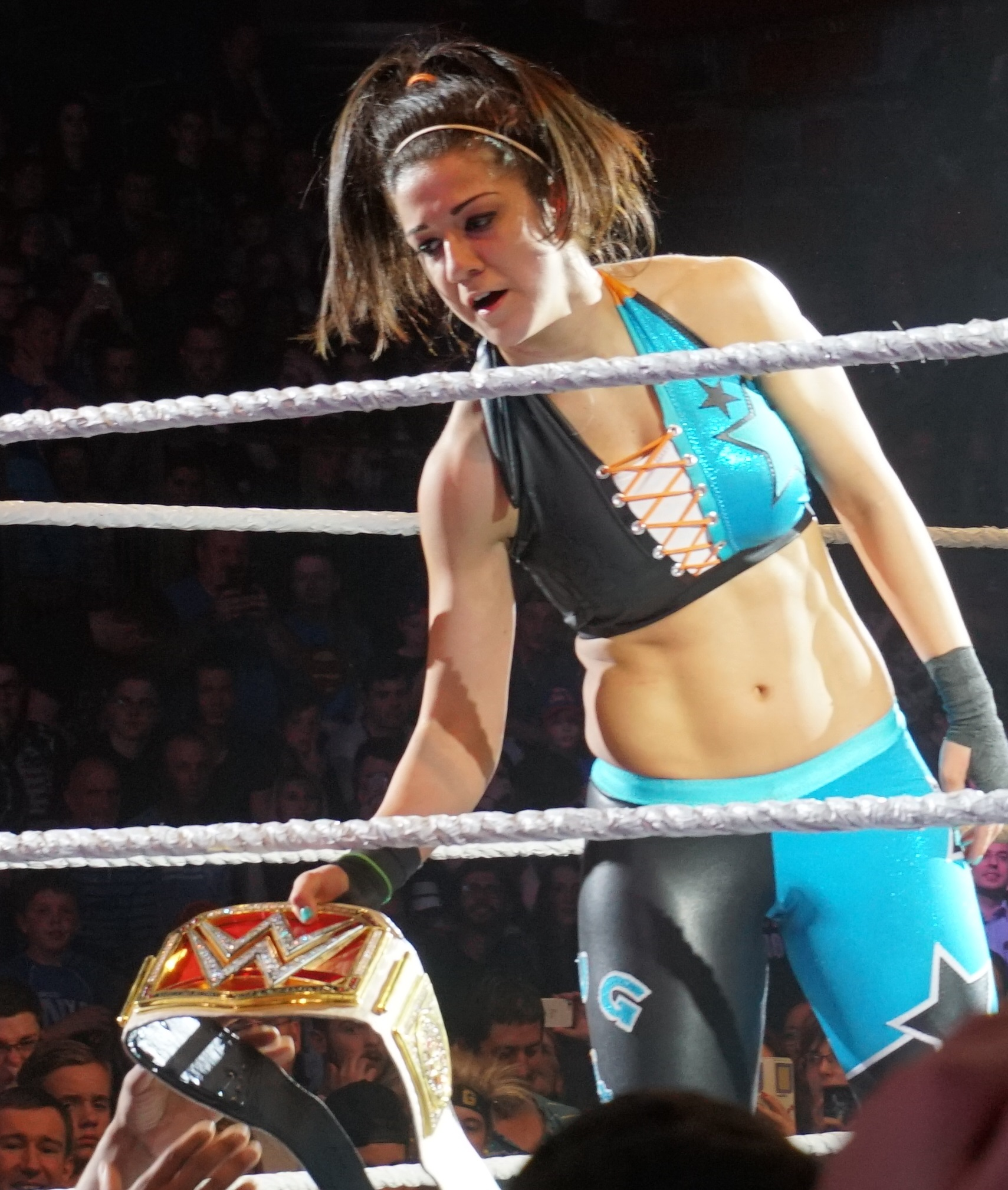
Bayley as the Raw Women's Champion in May 2017.

At Battleground on July 24, Bayley made her main roster debut in a one-off appearance as Banks' mystery tag team partner, defeating Charlotte and Dana Brooke. She made her official main roster debut on the August 22 episode of Raw, being established as part of the brand by Raw general manager Mick Foley and challenging the Raw Women's Champion Charlotte to a title match; she refused and instead forced her protégé Brooke to face her, whom Bayley defeated. At Clash of Champions on September 25, Bayley failed to win the championship from Charlotte in a triple threat match, which also included Banks. At Hell in a Cell on October 30, Bayley defeated Brooke. At Survivor Series on November 20, Bayley survived alongside Charlotte Flair as members of Team Raw, but was attacked by Flair after the match.

On the January 2, 2017, episode of Raw, Bayley defeated Jax to become the number one contender for Flair's Raw Women's Championship, but failed to win the title at Royal Rumble on January 29. She earned a rematch after she, Cesaro and Sheamus defeated Flair, Gallows and Anderson the next night on Raw, with Bayley pinning Flair. On the February 13 episode of Raw, Bayley defeated Flair in the main event to win the Raw Women's Championship after an assist from Banks. At Fastlane on March 5, Bayley successfully defended the title against Charlotte due to a distraction from Banks, in turn giving Charlotte her first pay-per-view loss. At WrestleMania 33 on April 2, she retained the title against Charlotte, Banks and Jax in a fatal four-way elimination match. At Payback on April 30, Bayley lost the title to Alexa Bliss, ending her reign at 76 days. She invoked her title rematch at Extreme Rules on June 4, but was unsuccessful in a kendo stick on a pole match. In July, Bayley again became the number one contender for the championship after defeating Banks and was slated to face Bliss at SummerSlam on August 20, but she suffered a separated shoulder injury during a match against Jax, which left her unable to perform. Bayley returned from her injury on the September 18 episode of Raw to help Banks fend off Bliss and Jax. At No Mercy six days later, she lost a fatal five-way match for the Raw Women's Championship.

==== The Boss 'n' Hug Connection (2017–2019) ====
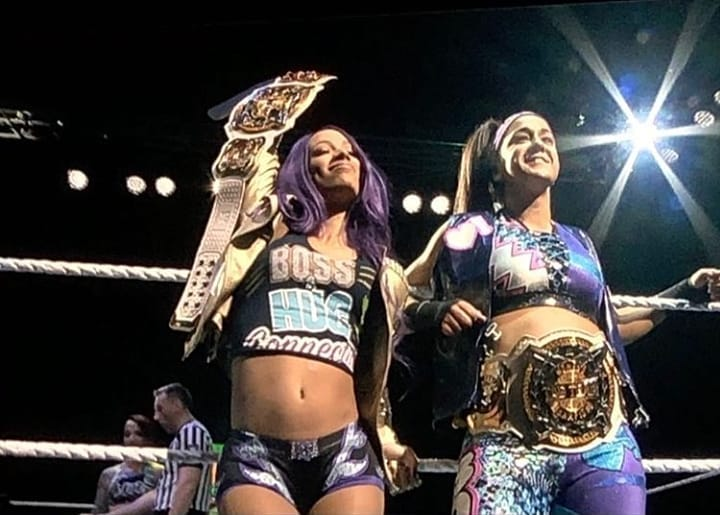
The Boss 'n' Hug Connection in March 2019

On November 19, at Survivor Series, Bayley was again part of Team Raw in a five–on–five elimination tag team match but was eliminated by Tamina. Towards the end of the year, Bayley, alongside Banks and Mickie James, started a feud with Absolution (Paige, Mandy Rose and Sonya Deville) that led to various singles and tag team matches, mostly won by Absolution. On January 28, 2018, at the Royal Rumble, Bayley competed in the inaugural women's Royal Rumble match, entering at number 29, but was eliminated by Banks. At Elimination Chamber on February 25, Bayley took part in the first women's Elimination Chamber match for the Raw Women's Championship, where she was eliminated by the champion Bliss after Banks pushed her off a pod. At the WrestleMania 34 kick-off show on April 8, Bayley competed in the inaugural WrestleMania Women's Battle Royal, where she eliminated Banks, and was the last woman eliminated from the match by Naomi.

On the March 26 episode of Raw, after weeks of animosity, including Bayley betraying Banks during their matches, Bayley and Banks brawled backstage and had to be separated. The two faced off in mid-April but their match ended in a no-contest after The Riott Squad (Ruby Riott, Liv Morgan and Sarah Logan) interfered and attacked them both. Throughout mid-2018, Bayley and Banks continued to attack each other, and were told to attend counselor meetings to help maintain their friendship. In July, the two reconciled and created a tag team known as The Boss 'n' Hug Connection. On October 28, Bayley took part in the first ever all women's pay–per–view Evolution, teaming with Banks and Natalya in a winning effort against The Riott Squad. At Survivor Series on November 18, Bayley competed as part of Team Raw, where she was eliminated via countout after a brawl with Sonya Deville outside the ring. On January 27, 2019, at Royal Rumble, Bayley entered the Royal Rumble match at number 27, but was eliminated by Charlotte Flair and Nia Jax.

At Elimination Chamber on February 17, Bayley and Banks won the inaugural WWE Women's Tag Team Championship by lastly eliminating Rose and Deville in a six tag team Elimination Chamber match. They made their first successful title defense at Fastlane on March 10 against Jax and Tamina. At WrestleMania 35 on April 7, they lost the titles to The IIconics (Billie Kay and Peyton Royce) in a fatal four-way match, ending their reign at 49 days.

==== SmackDown Women's Champion (2019–2021) ====
On April 16, Bayley was drafted to the SmackDown brand as part of the Superstar Shake-up, disbanding her team with Banks, who remained on Raw. At Money in the Bank on May 19, Bayley won the Money in the Bank ladder match, granting her a women's championship match at any time of her choosing. Later that night, she would cash in her Money in the Bank contract and defeat Charlotte Flair to win the SmackDown Women's Championship for the first time, making her the first WWE Women's Grand Slam winner in WWE history. Bayley then feuded with Alexa Bliss and Nikki Cross, defeating Bliss at Stomping Grounds on June 23, and retaining the title against the two in a handicap match at Extreme Rules on July 14. At SummerSlam on August 11, Bayley successfully defended the title against Ember Moon.

On the September 2 episode of Raw, Bayley helped Sasha Banks attack Becky Lynch with a steel chair, turning heel for the first time in her career. The following night on SmackDown Live, Bayley justified her attacking on Lynch, explaining that she was only helping Banks because of their friendship. On September 15, at Clash of Champions, Bayley retained the title against Flair after using an exposed turnbuckle, before losing it in a rematch at Hell in a Cell on October 6, ending her reign at 140 days. On the October 11 episode of SmackDown, Bayley debuted a new look, having cut off her ponytail and attacking the inflatable tube men (called "Bayley Buddies") during her entrance, then regaining the championship from Flair again before insulting the fans after the match, cementing her heel turn.

After Bayley's successful title defense against Cross on the November 1 episode of SmackDown due to interference from Banks, all three women were attacked by NXT Women's Champion Shayna Baszler. At Survivor Series on November 24, Bayley lost to Baszler and Raw Women's Champion Lynch in a non-title triple threat match. At Royal Rumble on January 26, 2020, she retained the title against Lacey Evans. On the following episode of SmackDown, Bayley claimed that she had beaten every woman on the roster, and Naomi interrupted, taking exception to the claim as Bayley had never beaten her. At Super ShowDown on February 27, Bayley defeated Naomi to retain the title in what was the first women's championship match contested in Saudi Arabia. On March 8, Bayley surpassed Flair's reign of 147 days, thus becoming the longest-reigning SmackDown Women's Champion. On the March 20 episode of SmackDown, Bayley and Banks said that they were going to skip WrestleMania 36, but they were interrupted by Paige, who announced that Bayley would defend her title against Naomi, Evans, Dana Brooke (who was later removed from the match), Tamina, and Sasha Banks in a six-pack elimination match at WrestleMania 36, which she did successfully on April 5 after lastly pinning Evans. At Money in the Bank on May 10, Bayley retained the title against Tamina.

Bayley and Banks defeated Alexa Bliss and Nikki Cross to win the Women's Tag Team Championship for the second time on the June 5 episode of SmackDown, making Bayley a double champion. At Backlash on June 14, Bayley and Banks retained the titles in a triple threat tag team match against Bliss and Cross and The IIconics. Bayley successfully defended her title against Cross on July 19 at The Horror Show at Extreme Rules and on the July 31 episode of SmackDown. She also retained her title against Asuka at SummerSlam on August 23. At Payback on August 30, Bayley and Banks lost the Women's Tag Team Championship against the newly formed team of Nia Jax and Shayna Baszler. On the September 4 episode of SmackDown, after failing to win the titles in a rematch, Bayley turned on Banks once again by attacking her, disbanding their team. At Clash of Champions on September 27, Bayley again retained the title against Asuka before she was attacked by Banks. On the October 9 episode of SmackDown, Bayley retained the title against Banks via disqualification, and in a backstage segment later that night, Banks challenged Bayley to another title match at Hell in a Cell inside the namesake structure, which was confirmed the next day. At the event on October 25, Bayley lost the SmackDown Women's Championship to Banks by submission, ending her reign at 380 days. At Survivor Series on November 22, Bayley was the self-appointed captain of Team SmackDown, but was eliminated by Peyton Royce.

On January 31, 2021, at Royal Rumble, Bayley was the first entrant in the titular match, eliminating Ruby Riott before she was eliminated by eventual winner Bianca Belair. Bayley unsuccessfully challenged Belair for the SmackDown Women's Championship at WrestleMania Backlash on May 16 and at Hell in a Cell inside of the namesake structure on June 20. She was booked to face Belair again in an "I Quit" match at Money in the Bank on July 18, but on July 9, WWE announced that Bayley suffered a torn ACL during training at the WWE Performance Center in Orlando that would sideline her for nine months. After the 2021 WWE Draft, she was left undrafted due to the injury, therefore making her a free agent.

==== Damage CTRL (2022–2024) ====
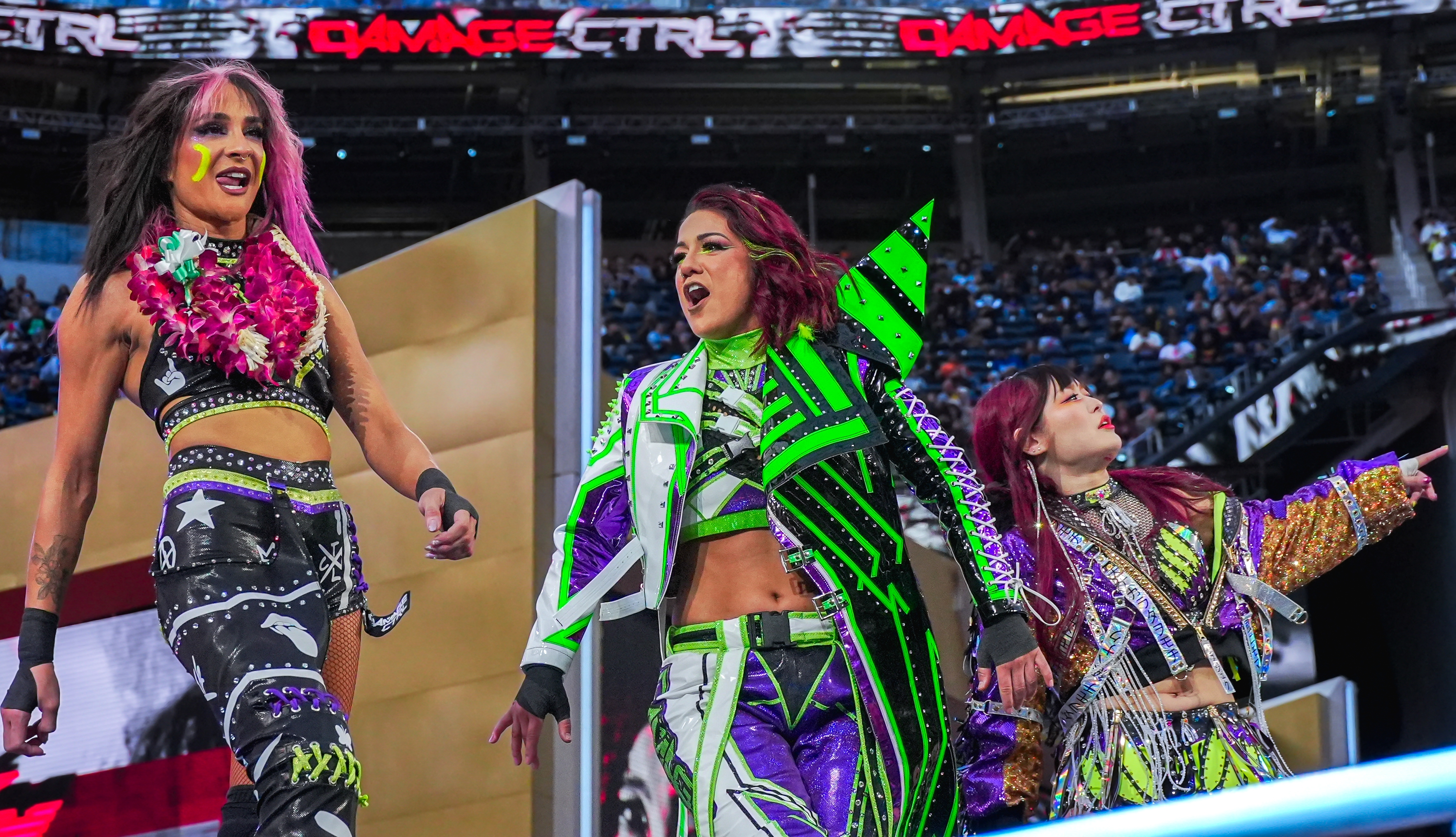
Damage CTRL making their entrance at WrestleMania 39.

At SummerSlam on July 30, 2022, Bayley returned after a year out of action, forming an alliance with Iyo Sky and Dakota Kai while confronting Belair after her Raw Women's Championship defense against Becky Lynch, resuming their feud and moving Bayley back to the Raw brand. On the August 8 episode of Raw, they challenged Belair, Alexa Bliss, and Asuka to a six-woman tag team match at Clash at the Castle, which they accepted. At the event on September 3, Bayley, Kai and Sky, under the name Damage CTRL, defeated Belair, Bliss and Asuka after Bayley pinned Belair. Bayley then failed to win the Raw Women's Championship from Belair in a ladder match on October 8 at Extreme Rules and in a Last Woman Standing match at Crown Jewel on November 5. At Survivor Series WarGames on November 26, Damage CTRL, Nikki Cross and Rhea Ripley lost to Belair, Bliss, Asuka, Mia Yim and Becky Lynch in a WarGames match when Lynch pinned Kai after a diving leg drop from the top of the cage through a table. At Royal Rumble on January 28, 2023, Bayley entered the women's Royal Rumble match at number 6, eliminating five women, including Lynch, before being eliminated by Liv Morgan. At Night 1 of WrestleMania 39 on April 1, Damage CTRL lost to Lynch, Lita, and Trish Stratus in a six-woman tag team match.

As part of the 2023 WWE Draft, Bayley, along with stablemates Kai and Sky, was drafted to the SmackDown brand. On the May 12 episode of SmackDown, Kai and Bayley failed to win the WWE Women's Tag Team Championship from Morgan and Raquel Rodriguez. After Morgan and Rodriguez vacated the titles due to Morgan suffering an injury, Bayley and Sky participated in a fatal four-way match for the vacant titles on the May 29 episode of Raw, but the match was won by Ronda Rousey and Shayna Baszler. At Money in the Bank on July 1, Bayley took part in the women's Money in the Bank ladder match. She pushed Sky, who also participated in the match, off the ladder when Sky was trying to grab the briefcase. Bayley was later handcuffed to Lynch by Sky to grab the briefcase and win the match. Nevertheless, Bayley helped Sky cash in her Money in the Bank briefcase to win the WWE Women's Championship at SummerSlam. Over the next few months, she helped Sky retain her title on several occasions while Asuka and Kairi Sane joined Damage CTRL. At Survivor Series WarGames on November 25, Damage CTRL lost to Belair, Lynch, Charlotte Flair and Shotzi in a WarGames match after Lynch pinned Bayley.

==== WWE Women's Champion (2024–2025) ====
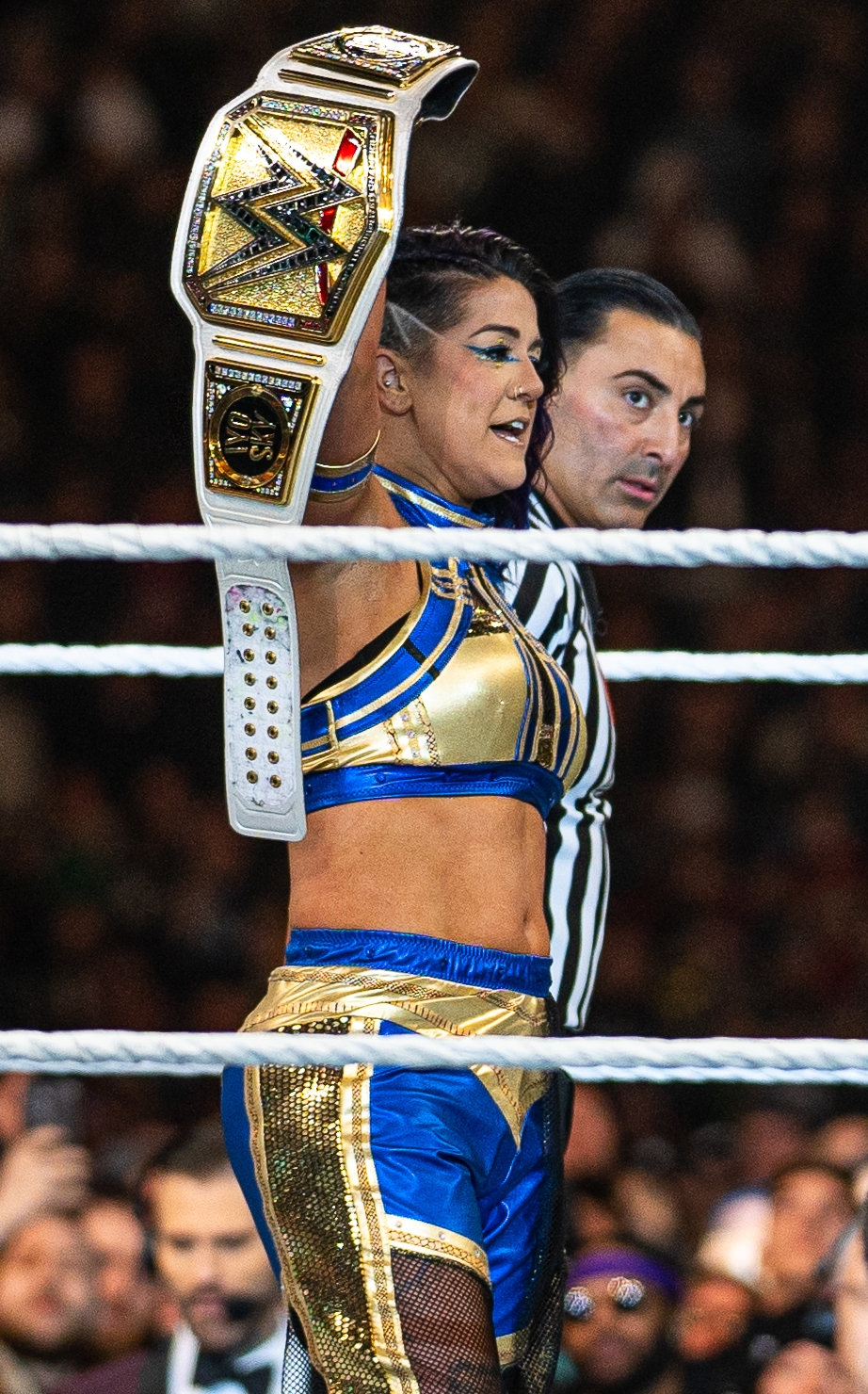
Bayley won the WWE Women's Championship at WrestleMania XL.

On January 27, 2024, at Royal Rumble, Bayley entered the women's Royal Rumble match at number 3 and won by last eliminating Liv Morgan. She also set a new record for the longest time spent in a single women's Royal Rumble match at 1:03:03, beating Rhea Ripley's record from the previous year. Bayley also became the second woman, after Asuka, to win the Royal Rumble, Money in the Bank, and Elimination Chamber matches and one of five people overall. On the February 2 episode of SmackDown, Bayley confronted Sky, Sane and Asuka for talking about her behind her back before being attacked by Sane and Asuka, kicking her out of the group. Afterwards, Bayley announced she would challenge Sky for the WWE Women's Championship at WrestleMania XL, turning face for the first time since 2019.

On Night 2 of WrestleMania XL on April 7, Bayley defeated Sky to win her second WWE Women's Championship. On the April 19 episode of SmackDown, Bayley defended the title against Naomi, but the match ended in a no contest after Tiffany Stratton attacked both Naomi and Bayley. This led to a triple threat match at Backlash France on May 4, where Bayley retained the title. At Clash at the Castle: Scotland on June 15, she retained her title against Piper Niven in the latter's home country. At SummerSlam on August 3, Bayley lost the title to Queen of the Ring winner Nia Jax after interference from Stratton, ending her reign at 118 days.

Bayley defeated Naomi to earn a rematch against Jax at Bad Blood on October 5, where she failed to regain the title after another interference from Stratton. On November 30, at Survivor Series WarGames, Bayley, Naomi, Sky, Belair and Ripley defeated Jax, Stratton, Candice LeRae and The Judgment Day (Morgan and Rodriguez) in a WarGames match. On the January 10, 2025, episode of SmackDown, Bayley won a fatal four-way match to become the number one contender for the WWE Women's Championship, but failed to win the title from Stratton the following week.

==== Storyline with Lyra Valkyria (2025–present) ====
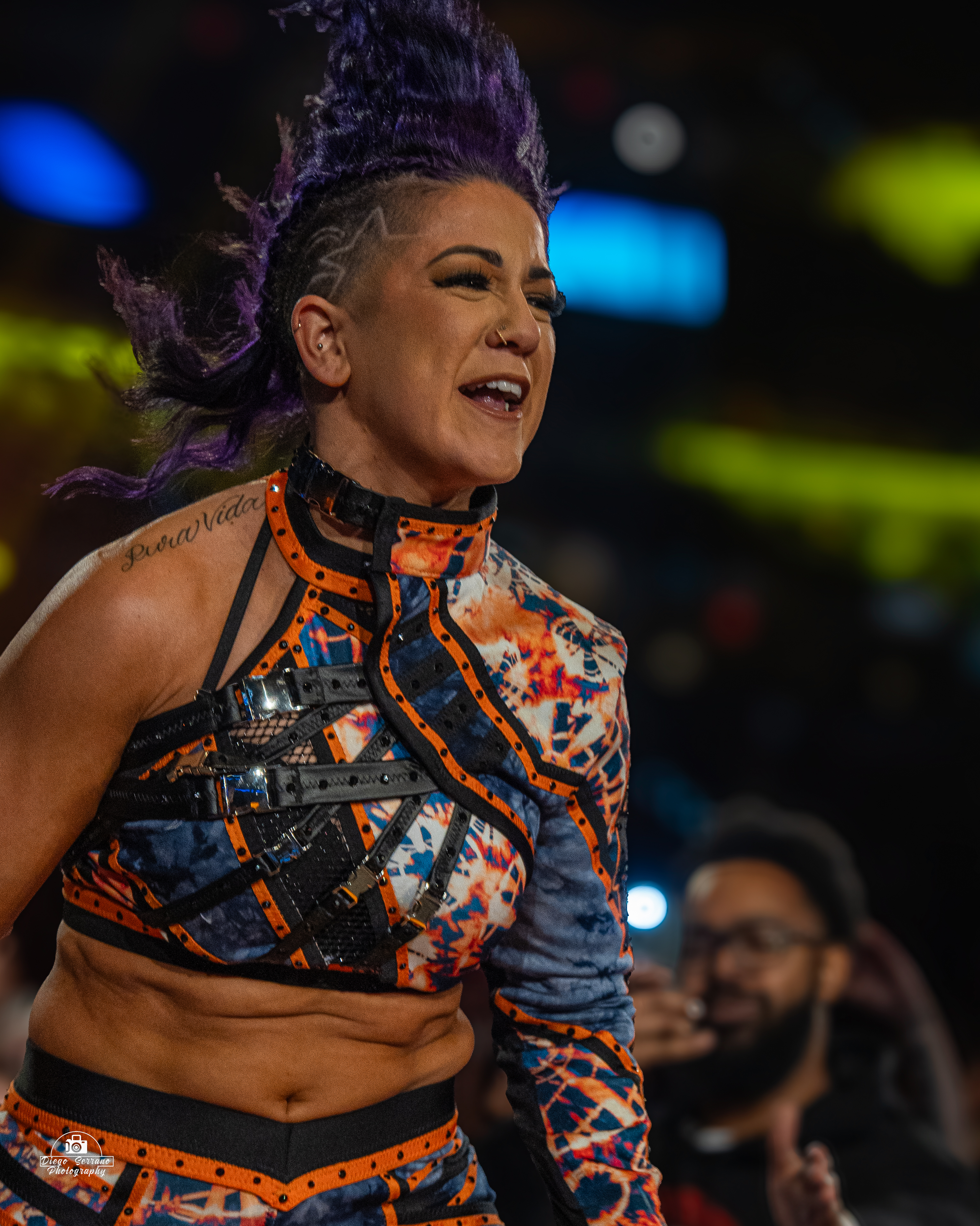
Bayley making her entrance at the 2025 Royal Rumble.

On January 20, it was announced that Bayley was transferred to the Raw brand. At Royal Rumble on February 1, Bayley entered at number 12, eliminating Shayna Baszler before she was eliminated by Nikki Bella. On February 15, at NXT Vengeance Day, Bayley failed to win the NXT Women's Championship from Giulia in a fatal-four way match also involving Roxanne Perez and Cora Jade. At Elimination Chamber: Toronto on March 1, she competed in the namesake match, but was eliminated by Liv Morgan.

On the April 7 episode of Raw, Bayley failed to win the Women's Intercontinental Championship from Lyra Valkyria. Five days later on SmackDown, Bayley and Valkyria won a gauntlet match to face Morgan and Rodriguez for the WWE Women's Tag Team Championship at Night 2 of WrestleMania 41 on April 20. However on April 19, Bayley would be (kayfabe) injured in an off-screen attack during the WrestleMania countdown show, forcing her to be pulled from the match and replaced by Becky Lynch. On the April 28 episode of Raw, it was revealed that Lynch was the one that attacked Bayley. On the June 9 episode of Raw, Bayley returned from a near two-month absence from television, where she attacked Lynch. On the June 23 episode of Raw, Bayley faced Lynch for the Women’s Intercontinental Championship but the match ended in a disqualification after interference from Valkyria. At Evolution on July 13, Bayley failed to win the title in a triple threat match against Lynch and Valkyria.

Following the event, Bayley and Valkyria began working as a tag team again. At Royal Rumble on January 31, 2026, Bayley entered the women's Royal Rumble match at number 23 but was eliminated by Nikki Bella. On 18 April at Night 1 of WrestleMania 42, Bayley and Valkyria unsuccessfully challenged The Irresistible Forces (Nia Jax and Lash Legend) for the WWE Women's Tag Team Championship in a fatal four-way match also involving Alexa Bliss and Charlotte Flair, and Paige and Brie Bella, who won the titles. On the June 22 episode of Raw, after failing to win the titles, Valkyria turned on Bayley, thus starting a feud. At Saturday Night's Main Event XLV on July 18, Bayley lost to Valkyria via submission. After the match, Valkyria continued to attack Bayley by reapplying the hold outside the ring and then delivering her Nightwing finisher onto the steel steps. After a brief hiatus, Bayley returned on the September 7 episode of Raw to cost Valkyria a spot for the Money in the Bank ladder match.

=== Lucha Libre AAA Worldwide (2026) ===
On March 14, 2026, Bayley made an appearance in WWE's partner promotion Lucha Libre AAA Worldwide at Rey de Reyes, answering Flammer's open challenge for the AAA Reina de Reinas Championship, but failed to win the title after interference from Las Toxicas (La Hiedra and Lady Maravilla).

== Professional wrestling style and persona ==
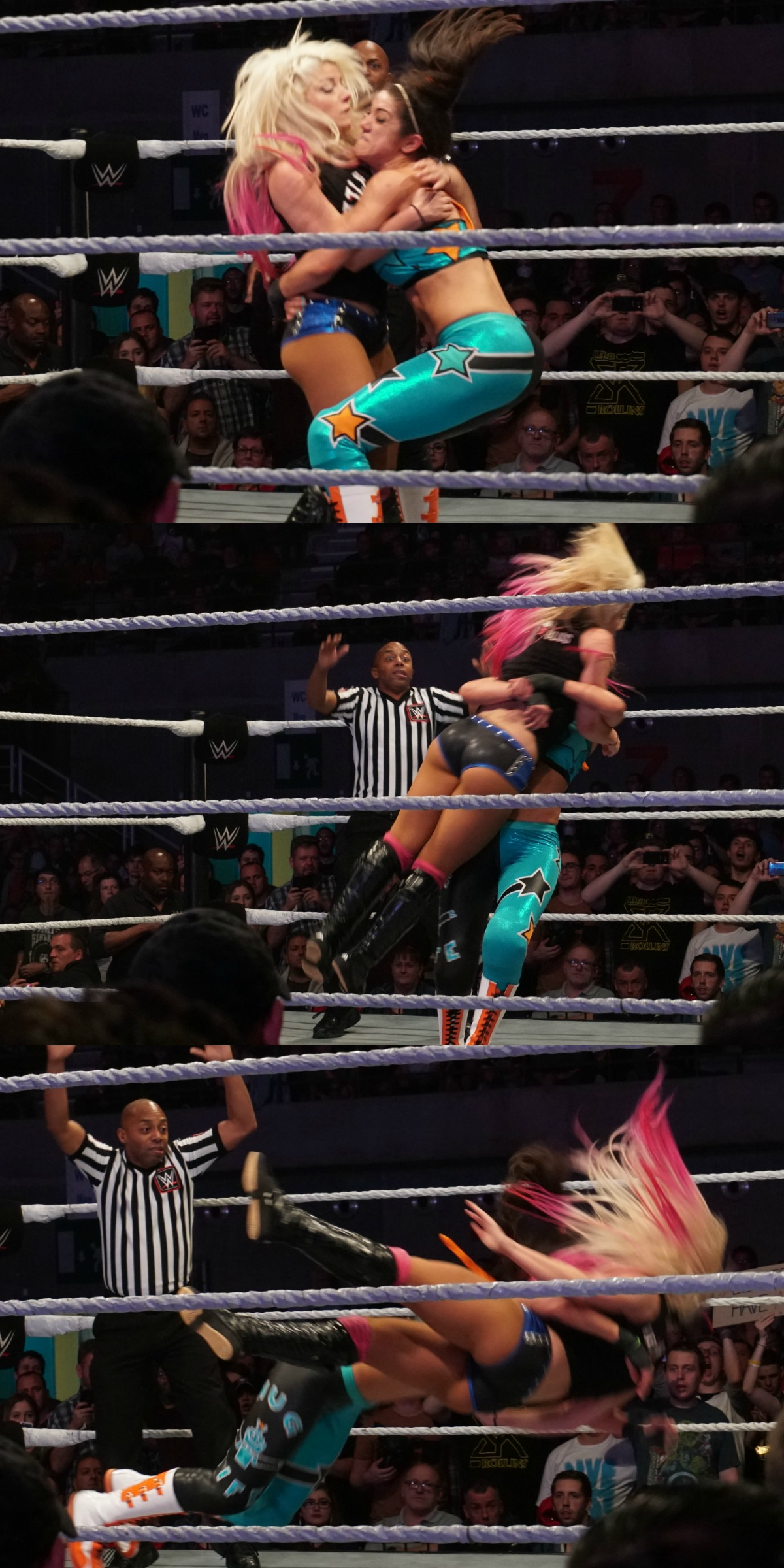
Bayley performs a belly-to-belly suplex on Alexa Bliss

When beginning her WWE career, Bayley was depicted as a "hugger", coming out with multiple inflatable skydancers during her entrances as well as hugging many fans (particularly younger children) in attendance. Following her heel turn, she started calling herself a role model and was depicted as a hypocrite, acting as nothing had changed with her entrance music and in-ring gear remaining intact, despite developing villainous traits and underhanded tactics. On the October 11, 2019 episode of SmackDown, Bayley debuted a new look, having cut her ponytail off, destroying her inflatable tube men, and using profanity against the fans in her post-match promo. Following her face turn in 2024 after winning the Royal Rumble, she frequently mixes sardonicism and irony while playing to the crowd, an act that has become beloved by fans.

During her hugger persona, Bayley used a belly-to-belly suplex as her finisher, calling it the Bayley-to-Belly Suplex. Since her heel turn, she started utilizing an old finisher previously used on the independent circuit, an arm trap headlock driver known as the Rose Plant.

== Other media ==
She is a playable character as Bayley in the video games WWE 2K17, WWE 2K18, WWE 2K19, WWE 2K20, WWE 2K Battlegrounds, WWE 2K22, WWE 2K23, WWE 2K24, WWE 2K25 and WWE 2K26.

== Personal life ==
Martinez was engaged to fellow professional wrestler Aaron Solo, whom she met in 2010, but the engagement was called off and they ended their relationship in February 2021.

Martinez cites Bret Hart, Eddie Guerrero, the Hardy Boyz, Ivory, Lita, Randy Orton, Randy Savage, Rey Mysterio, The Rock, Triple H, Trish Stratus, and Victoria as her influences in wrestling. She is a supporter of the NFL's San Francisco 49ers, the NHL's San Jose Sharks, and Major League Soccer's San Jose Earthquakes.

Since 2025, Martinez has hosted Lodestone, a wrestling training seminar for independent and international female wrestlers. The seminars have featured guest instruction from various wrestling personalities, including Natalya Neidhart and John Cena.

== Championships and accomplishments ==
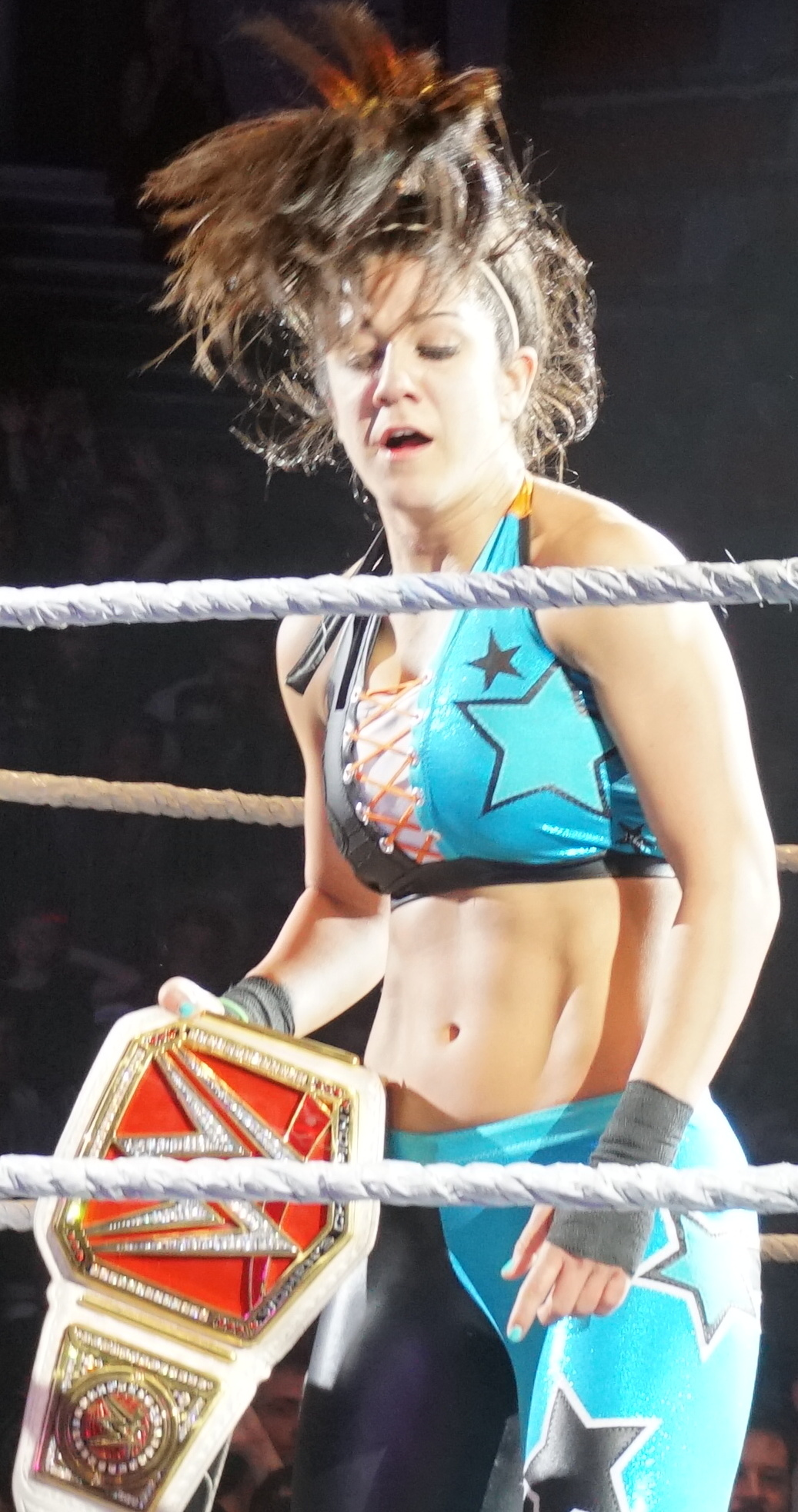
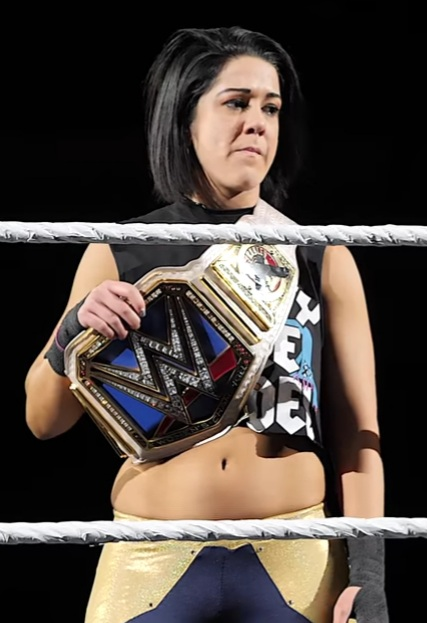
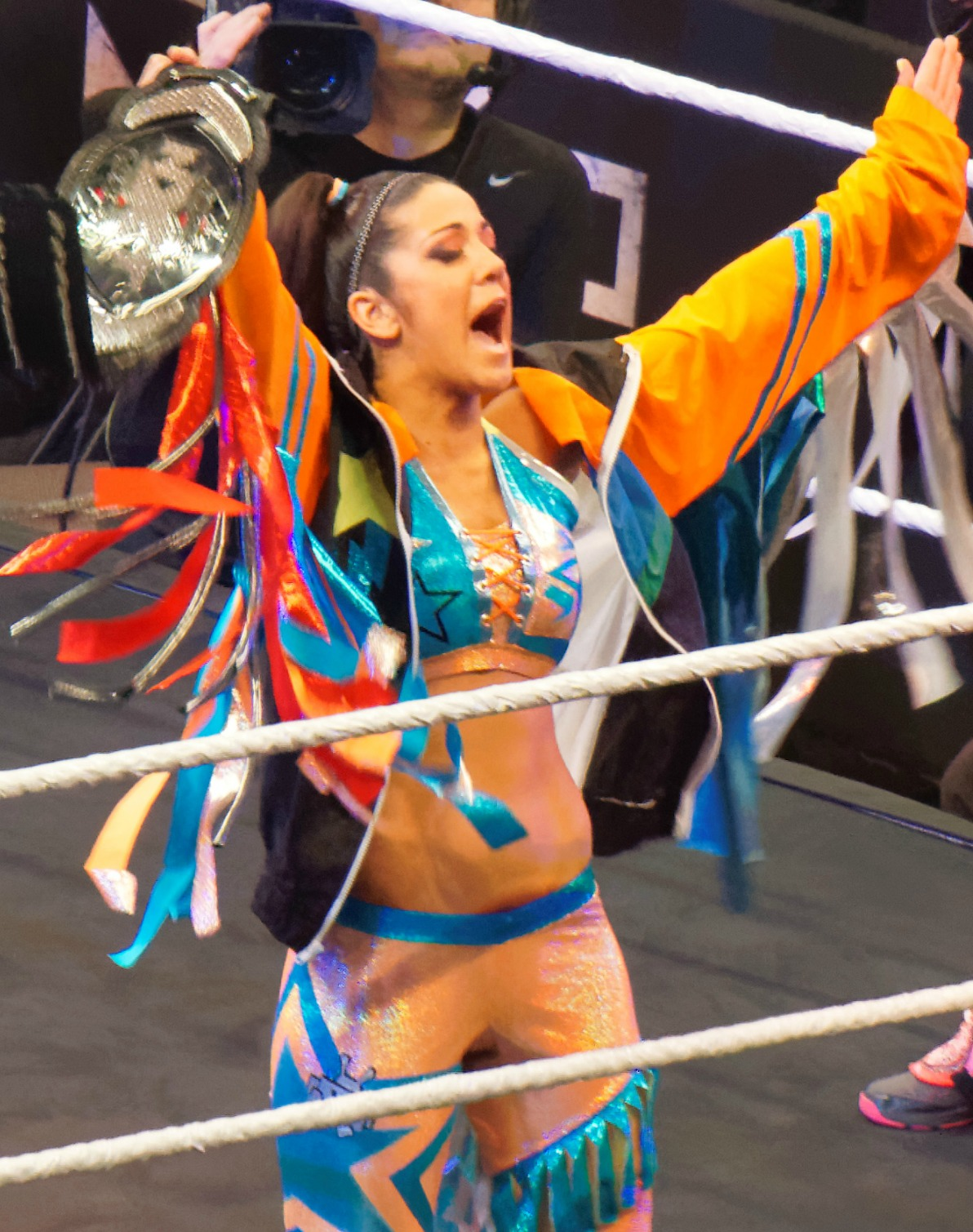
Bayley is a two-time WWE (Raw) Women's Champion (top picture), a two-time and the longest-reigning SmackDown Women's Champion (second picture), a former NXT Women's Champion (third picture), and a two-time WWE Women's Tag Team Champion (bottom picture).
- BBC
  - BBC Love Letter to Wrestling Championship recipient – with Seth Rollins
- Busted Open
  - Tag Team of the Year (2020) – with Sasha Banks
- CBS Sports
  - Tag Team of the Year (2020) – with Sasha Banks
- Inside The Ropes Magazine
  - Female Wrestler of the Year (2020)
- Pro Wrestling Illustrated
  - Feud of the Year (2020) vs. Sasha Banks
  - Inspirational Wrestler of the Year (2015, 2016)
  - Match of the Year (2015) vs. Sasha Banks at NXT TakeOver: Respect
  - Tag Team of the Year (2020) – with Sasha Banks
  - Ranked No. 1 of the top 100 female singles wrestlers in the PWI Women's 100 in 2020
  - Ranked No. 3 of the top 50 tag teams in the PWI Tag Team 50 in 2020 – with Sasha Banks
- Rolling Stone
  - NXT Match of the Year (2015) vs. Sasha Banks at NXT TakeOver: Brooklyn
  - Title Feud of the Year, NXT (2015) vs. Sasha Banks for the NXT Women's Championship
- Sports Illustrated
  - Ranked No. 6 of the top 10 wrestlers in 2020
  - Ranked No. 8 of the top 10 women's wrestlers in 2019 – tied with Sasha Banks
- Wrestling Observer Newsletter
  - Most Improved (2015)
  - Worst Feud of the Year (2018) vs. Sasha Banks
  - Women's Wrestling MVP (2020)
- WWE
  - WWE Women's Championship (2 times)
  - WWE SmackDown Women's Championship (2 times)
  - NXT Women's Championship (1 time)
  - WWE Women's Tag Team Championship (2 times, inaugural) – with Sasha Banks
  - Women's Money in the Bank (2019)
  - Women's Royal Rumble (2024)
  - First WWE Women's Triple Crown Champion
  - First WWE Women's Grand Slam Champion
  - NXT Year-End Award (2 times)
    - Female Competitor of the Year (2015)
    - Match of the Year (2015) vs. Sasha Banks at NXT TakeOver: Brooklyn
  - Ranked No. 10 of the top 50 Greatest WWE Female Superstars of all time (2021)
  - Slammy Award (2 times)
    - Double-Cross of the Year (2020) – for attacking Sasha Banks on SmackDown (September 4)
    - Social Media Superstar of the Year (2020)
  - Bumpy Award (1 time)
    - Tag Team of the Half-Year (2020) – with Sasha Banks
    - Social Superstar of the Half-Year (2021)
