= Insurrextion (2003) =

World Wrestling Entertainment pay-per-view event

- DVD cover featuring various WWE wrestlers
- Promotion: World Wrestling Entertainment
- Brand: Raw
- Date: June 7, 2003
- City: Newcastle, England
- Venue: Telewest Arena
- Attendance: 10,000

Pay-per-view chronology
← Previous; Judgment Day	Next → Bad Blood

Insurrextion chronology
← Previous; 2002	Next → Final

WWE in Europe chronology
← Previous; Rebellion	Next → NXT TakeOver: London

The 2003 Insurrextion was a professional wrestling pay-per-view (PPV) event produced by the American promotion World Wrestling Entertainment (WWE) and broadcast exclusively in the United Kingdom. It was the fourth annual and final Insurrextion and took place on June 7, 2003, at the Telewest Arena in Newcastle, England, held exclusively for wrestlers from the promotion's Raw brand division.

Seven matches were contested at the event, with two dark matches. In the main event, Triple H defeated Kevin Nash in a Street Fight to retain the World Heavyweight Championship. In other prominent matches, Christian defeated Booker T to retain the WWE Intercontinental Championship, Kane and Rob Van Dam defeated La Résistance (René Duprée and Sylvain Grenier) to retain the World Tag Team Championship, and in the opening bout, Jazz defeated Trish Stratus to retain the WWE Women's Championship.

Following this 2003 event, Insurrextion was discontinued as the promotion ended production of UK-exclusive PPVs, subsequently making this the final UK-exclusive PPV. This in turn made this the only Insurrextion produced under the WWE name, as the promotion was renamed from World Wrestling Federation (WWF) to WWE just two days after the previous year's event. Following this event, WWE did not produce another PPV outside of North America until 2018 with that year's Greatest Royal Rumble, which was held in Saudi Arabia. The 2003 Insurrextion would also be the final PPV to take place in the United Kingdom until Clash at the Castle in 2022 and in England specifically until Money in the Bank in 2023.

== Production ==
=== Background ===
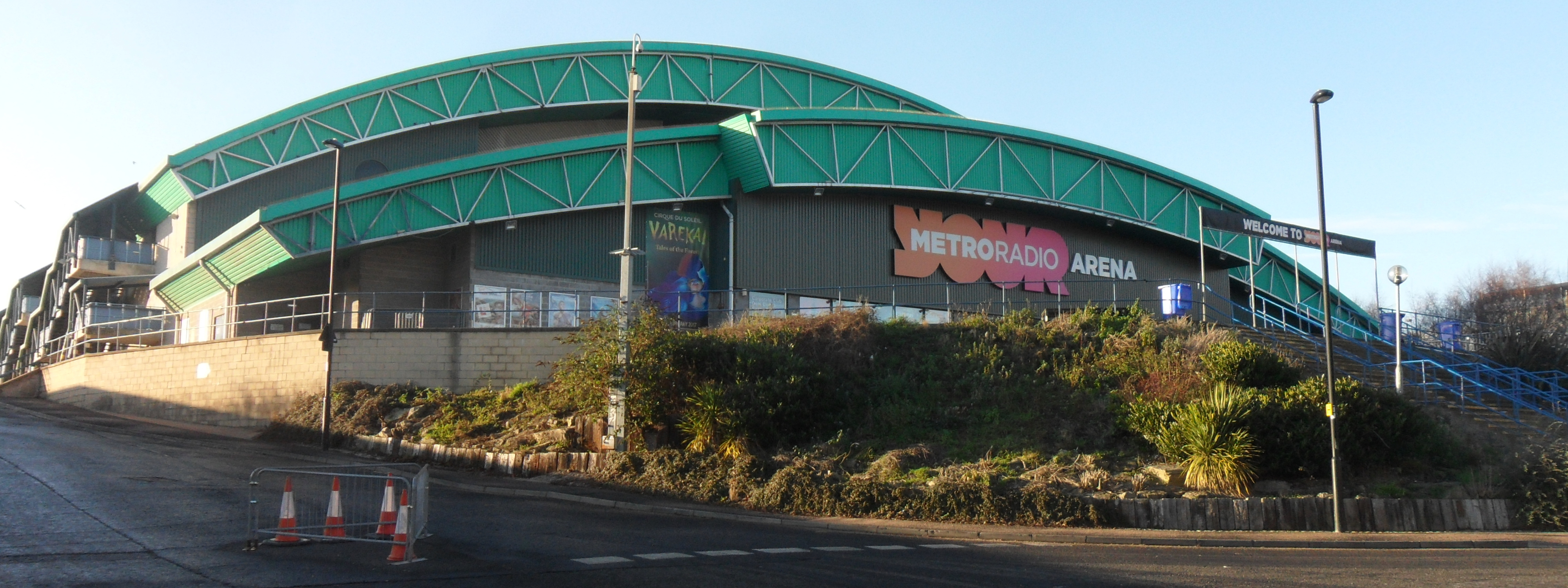
The fourth annual Insurrextion was held at the Telewest Arena in Newcastle, England.

Insurrextion was an annual professional wrestling pay-per-view (PPV) event produced by the American promotion World Wrestling Entertainment (WWE) since 2000 and broadcast exclusively in the United Kingdom. It was one of two annual UK-exclusive PPVs, along with Rebellion. The fourth Insurrextion was held on June 7, 2003, at the Telewest Arena in Newcastle, England. Like the previous year, it featured wrestlers exclusively from the Raw brand. This was the only Insurrextion produced under the WWE name, as the company was renamed from World Wrestling Federation (WWF) to WWE just two days after the previous year's event.

=== Storylines ===
The event featured nine professional wrestling matches and two pre-show matches that involved different wrestlers from pre-existing scripted feuds and storylines.

== Aftermath ==
The 2003 Insurrextion would be the final Insurrextion event, as WWE discontinued UK-exclusive PPVs after this event as the company began to periodically broadcast its weekly television shows, Raw and SmackDown!, from the UK in 2004. WWE would not hold another PPV outside of North America until the Greatest Royal Rumble in April 2018, which was held in Saudi Arabia and was the first in a series of PPVs held in that country. In September 2022, WWE produced its first UK PPV in 19 years as Clash at the Castle, which was broadcast worldwide instead of only in the UK. The 2003 Insurrextion was also WWE's final PPV to be held in England until Money in the Bank in 2023.

== Results ==
No.	Results	Stipulations	Times
1^{D}	Maven defeated Christian Eckstein	Singles match	—
2^{D}	The Hurricane defeated Lance Storm	Singles match	—
3	Jazz (c) (with Theodore Long) defeated Trish Stratus	Singles match for the WWE Women's Championship	9:49
4	Christian (c) defeated Booker T	Singles match for the WWE Intercontinental Championship	15:12
5	Kane and Rob Van Dam (c) defeated La Résistance (René Duprée and Sylvain Grenier)	Tag team match for the World Tag Team Championship	9:03
6	Goldust defeated Rico	Singles match	9:53
7	The Dudley Boyz (Bubba Ray Dudley, D-Von Dudley and Spike Dudley) defeated Christopher Nowinski, Rodney Mack and Theodore Long	Six-man tag team match	9:15
8	Scott Steiner defeated Test	Singles match with Val Venis as special guest referee	6:49
9	Triple H (c) (with Ric Flair) defeated Kevin Nash (with Shawn Michaels)	Street Fight for the World Heavyweight Championship	14:55
(c) / – the champion(s) heading into the match; D / – this was a dark match

== Other on-screen talent ==
Commentators

- Jim Ross
- Jerry "The King" Lawler

Interviewers

- Al Snow

Ring announcer

- Howard Finkel

Referees

- Charles Robinson
- Jack Doan
- Chad Patton
- Earl Hebner

== See also ==
- Professional wrestling in the United Kingdom
