= No Mercy (2007) =

World Wrestling Entertainment pay-per-view event

- Promotional poster featuring Randy Orton
- Promotion: World Wrestling Entertainment
- Brand(s): Raw; SmackDown! ECW
- Date: October 7, 2007
- City: Rosemont, Illinois
- Venue: Allstate Arena
- Attendance: 12,500
- Buy rate: 271,000

Pay-per-view chronology
← Previous; Unforgiven	Next → Cyber Sunday

No Mercy chronology
← Previous; 2006	Next → 2008

The 2007 No Mercy was a professional wrestling pay-per-view (PPV) event produced by World Wrestling Entertainment (WWE). It was the 10th No Mercy and took place on October 7, 2007, at the Allstate Arena in the Chicago suburb of Rosemont, Illinois, held for wrestlers from the promotion's Raw, SmackDown!, and ECW brand divisions. This was the first No Mercy since 2002 to feature multiple brands after WWE discontinued brand-exclusive PPVs following WrestleMania 23 in April, also making it the first No Mercy to feature ECW, which was introduced as a third brand in May 2006.

Nine professional wrestling matches were scheduled on the event's supercard. The scheduled main event from the Raw brand was scheduled to be WWE Champion John Cena defending his title against challenger Randy Orton in a Last Man Standing match; however, on the October 1 episode of Raw, Cena legitimately tore his right pectoral muscle, causing the match and the title to be canceled and vacated, respectively. As a result, the main event turned into three matches as Triple H competed in all those three matches that night for the WWE Championship, where he first defeated the newly-crowned champion Randy Orton (Orton was awarded the title by Mr. McMahon in the beginning of the show), later defeated Umaga to retain the title, and then, on the last match of the card, he lost his title back to Orton in a Last Man Standing match. The predominant match from the SmackDown! brand had World Heavyweight Champion Batista defeating challenger The Great Khali in a Punjabi Prison match. The primary match from the ECW brand was ECW Champion CM Punk defeating challenger Big Daddy V by disqualification. Also on the undercard, Finlay and Rey Mysterio fought to a no contest.

The 2007 No Mercy event had an approximate attendance of 12,500 and received approximately 271,000 pay-per-view buys. This event helped WWE obtain a pay-per-view revenue of $19.9 million. When the event was released on DVD, it reached a peak position of nineteenth on Billboard's DVD Sales Chart.

== Production ==
=== Background ===
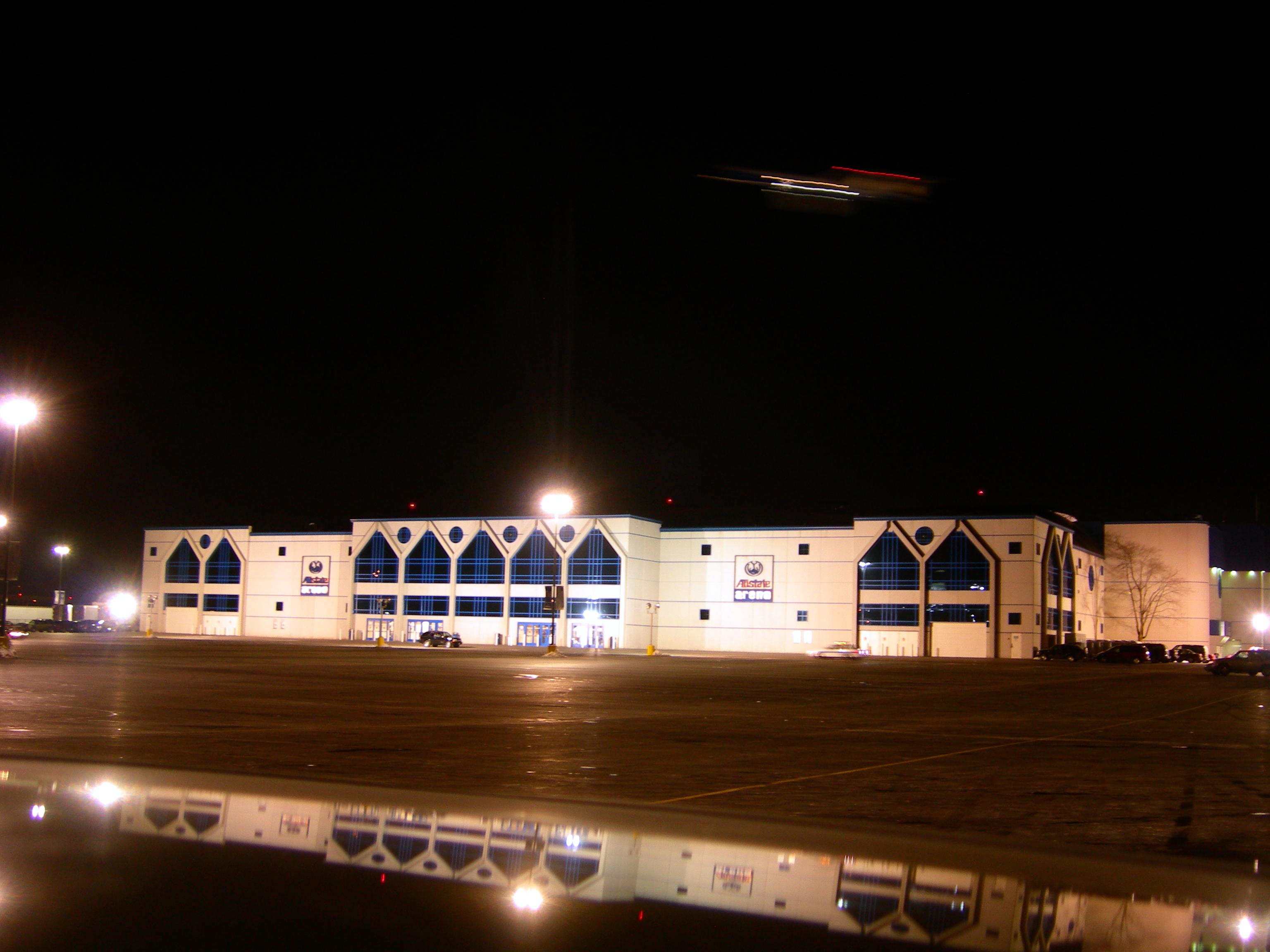
The 10th No Mercy was held at the Allstate Arena in the Chicago suburb of Rosemont, Illinois.

No Mercy was first held by World Wrestling Entertainment (WWE) as a United Kingdom-exclusive professional wrestling pay-per-view (PPV) event in May 1999. A second No Mercy was then held later that same year in October, but in the United States, which established No Mercy as the annual October PPV for the promotion. The 10th event was held on October 7, 2007, at the Allstate Arena in the Chicago suburb of Rosemont, Illinois. While the previous four years's events featured wrestlers exclusively from the SmackDown! brand, the 2007 event featured wrestlers from the Raw, SmackDown!, and ECW brands as following WrestleMania 23 in April, brand-exclusive PPVs were discontinued. As a result, this was the first No Mercy since 2002 to feature Raw as well as the first to feature ECW, which was introduced as a third brand in May 2006.

=== Storylines ===
The card consisted of eight matches which resulted from scripted storylines involving wrestlers from either Raw, SmackDown!, or ECW — the three brand divisions to which WWE assigned its employees.

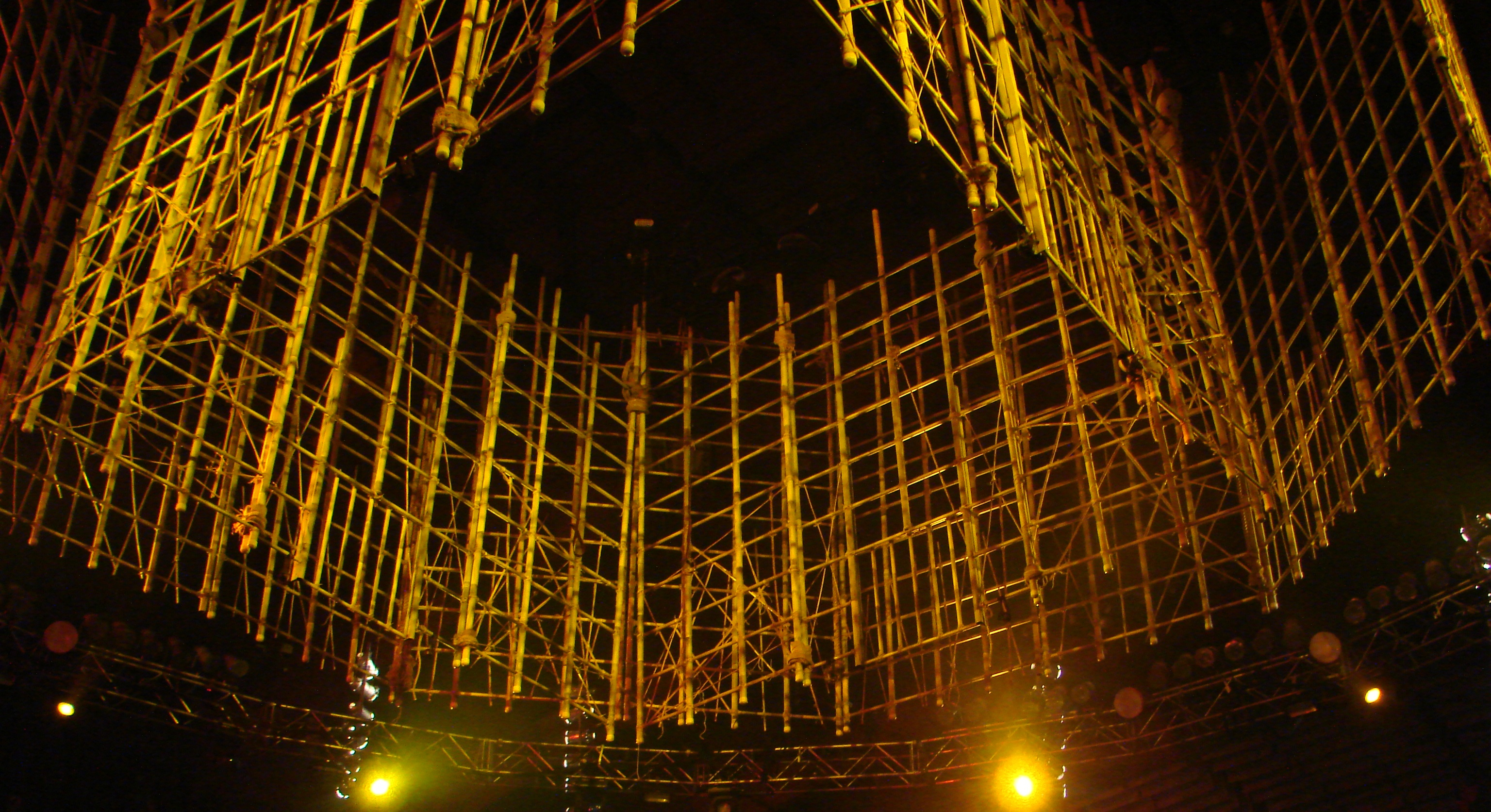
SmackDown!'s World Heavyweight Championship was defended in a Punjabi Prison match.

The main storyline on the SmackDown! brand was between Batista and The Great Khali over the World Heavyweight Championship. Their rivalry began in July when Khali issued a challenge to the SmackDown roster, which Batista answered. After Khali won the World Heavyweight Championship, a match between Batista and Kane to determine his challenger at The Great American Bash resulted in a no-contest due to Khali interfering. As a result, general manager Theodore Long scheduled Khali to defend the championship against both Batista and Kane in a triple threat match at The Great American Bash. Khali retained the championship. Batista defeated Khali by disqualification at SummerSlam but, as per WWE rules, Khali retained the title. The following month at Unforgiven, Khali faced off against Batista and Rey Mysterio in another triple threat match, in which Batista pinned Khali to win the championship. The same week on SmackDown!, Khali demanded that his rematch for the World Heavyweight Championship at No Mercy would be a Punjabi Prison match.

Another rivalry was on the ECW brand between CM Punk and Big Daddy V over the ECW Championship. This rivalry began when ECW authority figure Armando Estrada scheduled an "Elimination Chase to No Mercy", involving Elijah Burke, Tommy Dreamer, Kevin Thorn, and Stevie Richards. Over a three-week period, Richards, Thorn, and Burke were eliminated, with Dreamer winning the number one contendership. Estrada, however, revealed that Big Daddy V was also a contender, and he quickly defeated Dreamer to earn the chance to fight Punk for the title.

The Women's rivalry on the Raw brand was between Candice Michelle and Beth Phoenix over the WWE Women's Championship. Shortly after returning to WWE as a villainess, Phoenix won a battle royal to become the #1 Contender for Candice's Women's Championship. Phoenix received her title opportunity at Unforgiven, but she was defeated by Candice. However, on the September 24 episode of Raw, Phoenix pinned Candice in a mixed tag team match, and as a result, she earned her another shot at the Women's Championship, which would take place at No Mercy.

==== Canceled match ====
The main rivalry leading into the event on the Raw brand was between John Cena and Randy Orton over the WWE Championship. At WWE's August pay-per-view event SummerSlam, Cena successfully defended the championship against Orton, and the following night on Raw, Orton interfered in Cena's match with King Booker which Cena won by disqualification. After the match ended, Orton attacked Cena's real-life father, in storyline, by kicking him in the head. As a result of Orton's actions, the two met in a WWE Championship match at Unforgiven, in which Cena was disqualified for ignoring the referee's commands; as per WWE rules, a title can only change hands via pinfall or submission, Orton was not awarded the title. Following their match, Cena's father gained revenge on Orton by kicking him in the head the same way Orton had done to him earlier. Later in the night after the event went off the air, authority figure Jonathan Coachman made a rematch between the two at No Mercy in a Last Man Standing match. On the October 1 episode of Raw, Cena legitimately tore his right pectoral muscle during a match with Mr. Kennedy, though the injury was blamed on television on a post-match attack by Orton. Due to the severity of his injury, Cena was forced to vacate the title. Although Cena's match against Orton was canceled, World Wrestling Entertainment Chairman Vince McMahon stated that there would be "a new WWE Champion crowned at No Mercy".

== Event ==
Other on-screen personnel
Role:	Name:
English commentators	Jim Ross (Raw)
English commentators	Jerry Lawler (Raw)
English commentators	Michael Cole (SmackDown!)
English commentators	John "Bradshaw" Layfield (SmackDown!)
English commentators	Joey Styles (ECW)
English commentators	Tazz (ECW)
Spanish commentators	Carlos Cabrera
Spanish commentators	Hugo Savinovich
Interviewer	Todd Grisham
Ring announcers	Lilian Garcia (Raw)
Ring announcers	Tony Chimel (SmackDown!/ECW)
Referees	Scott Armstrong (ECW)
Referees	Jim Korderas (SmackDown!)
Referees	Marty Elias (Raw)
Referees	Chad Patton (Raw)
Referees	Mickie Henson (SmackDown!)
Referees	John Cone (ECW)
Referees	Mike Posey
Referees	Mike Chioda (Raw)
Referees	Charles Robinson (SmackDown!)

Before the event began and aired live on pay-per-view, a dark match was contested between Hardcore Holly and Cody Rhodes. Holly defeated Rhodes via pinfall to win the match.

=== Preliminary matches ===
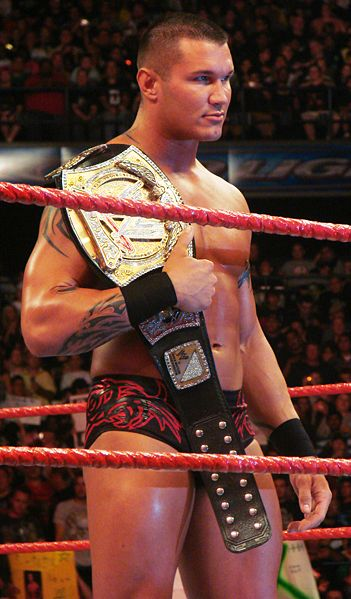
Randy Orton received Raw's vacant WWE Championship at the start of the event by Vince McMahon.

The pay-per-view opened with no intro graphics, and an in-ring segment featuring Raw General manager William Regal and WWE Chairman Vince McMahon, who awarded the WWE Championship to Randy Orton due to John Cena's injury, causing Cena to vacate the title. McMahon informed Orton that he would have to defend the title that night; Triple H then came to the ring and challenged Orton to a match for the title, which Orton rejected. McMahon, however, relented to Triple H's request and made the match, which became the opening contest of the event. The first match, therefore, pitted Orton defending his title against Triple H. During the match, Orton attempted an RKO, but the move was countered by Triple H into a Pedigree attempt, only for Orton to counter with a back body drop. The match ended shortly after when Orton placed Triple H in the ring turnbuckle and tried to tackle him; Triple H moved out of the way and rolled up his opponent for the pinfall. In result, Triple H became WWE Champion.

After that, Jeff Hardy, Brian Kendrick, and Paul London faced Mr. Kennedy, Lance Cade and Trevor Murdoch in a six-man tag team match. In the early stages of the match, all six men wrestled inconclusively until Kennedy executed a second rope rolling fireman's carry slam, known as a Green Bay Plunge. Kennedy pinned London to win the match for his team.

In a backstage segment, Vince McMahon informed Triple H that as he had previously been booked for a match against Umaga, the match would still take place that night, with the added stipulation of being for the WWE Championship.

Next, CM Punk defended the ECW Championship against Big Daddy V, who was accompanied by Matt Striker. Soon after the match began, Punk knocked down Big Daddy V with a dropkick. Striker then jumped in the ring and attacked Punk, which caused a disqualification victory for Punk, by which he retained his championship. Following the disqualification, Big Daddy V attacked Punk.

After this, a pizza eating contest between Matt Hardy and Montel Vontavious Porter (MVP) occurred in the ring. Tazz was the host and Maria and Melina were the judges. In order to win the competition, one competitor had to eat more slices of pizza than the opponent in two minutes. Hardy finished two slices in the time limit and then proceeded to vomit on MVP, who didn't finish any, which won Hardy the competition.

=== Main event matches ===
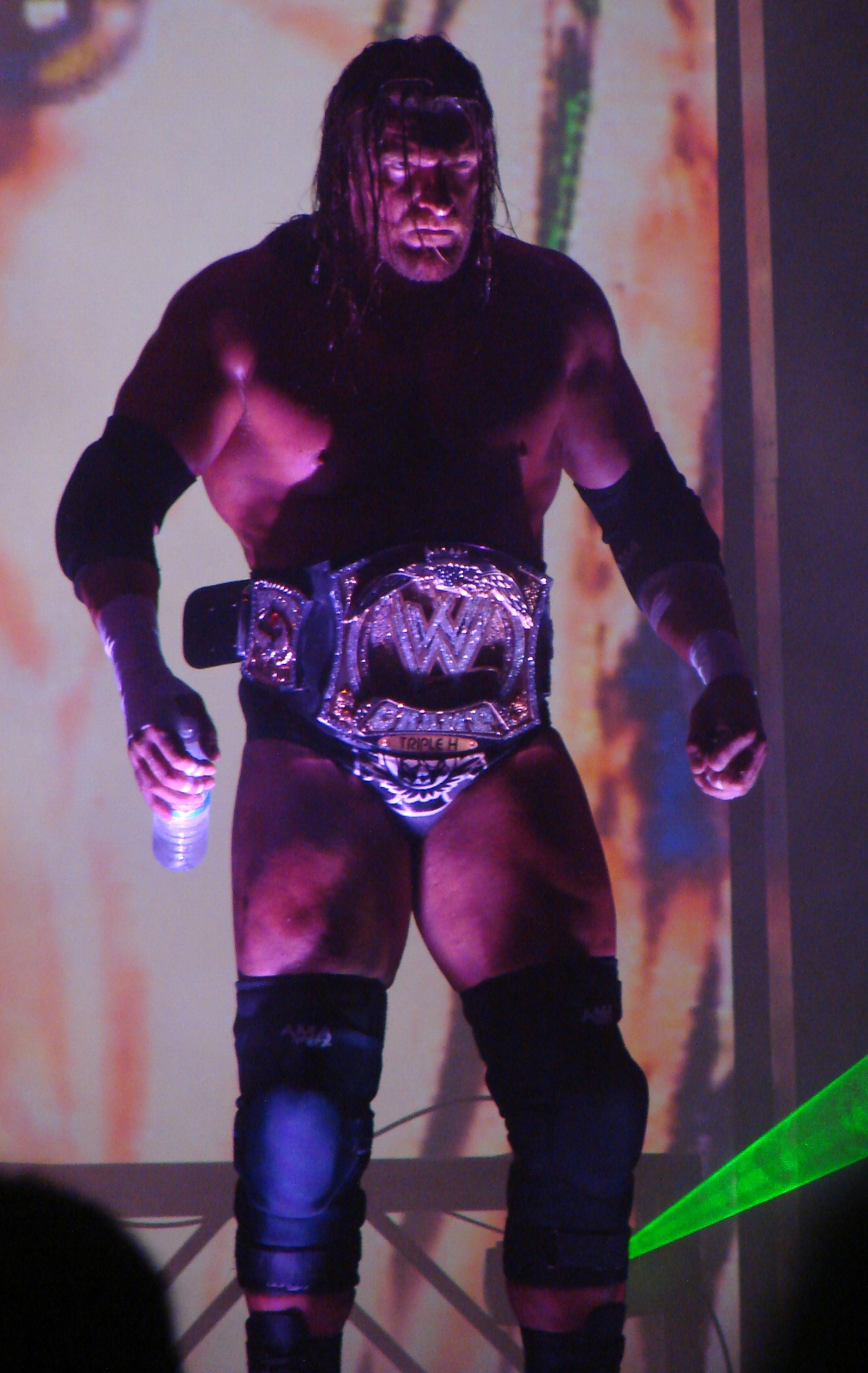
Triple H at No Mercy after he won Raw's WWE Championship from Randy Orton in the first match of the event. Later in the night, Orton won the championship back in a rematch.

In the next match, Triple H defended the WWE Championship against Umaga. Both men performed a variety of wrestling maneuvers, including a DDT from Triple H onto Umaga, and a Samoan drop from Umaga onto Triple H. Umaga attacked Triple H's ribs throughout the match, but Triple H gained an advantage when Umaga missed a hip attack. Umaga attempted to splash Triple H, who was standing at the turnbuckle, but Triple H moved and Umaga crashed into the ring post. Triple H then performed a Pedigree for the pinfall, thereby retaining his championship.

After that, Finlay faced Rey Mysterio. Both men performed many offensive maneuvers through the match, but Mysterio gained the advantage when he kicked Finlay as he hung from the ropes, followed by a Leg drop, sending Finlay to ringside area and striking his head. In result of an injury, Finlay was stretchered out of the ring, and Mysterio won the match via referee stoppage. However, as Finlay was being stretchered out, he sat up and attacked Mysterio.

While Triple H had his ribs iced, Vince McMahon stated that Randy Orton was invoking his rematch clause. McMahon scheduled a rematch for the same night and also decided that it would be a Last Man Standing match.

The next match, Candice Michelle defended the WWE Women's Championship against Beth Phoenix. The match ended when Phoenix slammed Michelle to the mat, before a cover for the pinfall, winning Phoenix the Women's Championship.

The seventh match was a Punjabi Prison match for the World Heavyweight Championship, where Batista defended the title against The Great Khali. After both men prevented each other from escaping, Khali struck Batista with a leather strap. Batista returned the favor, hit Khali with the strap as well and attempted to climb the inner cage. But Khali stopped him and squeezed Batista's head with a Vise Grip. Khali then called for a door to be opened but Batista struck him with a low blow. Batista, still hurt from the Vise Grip, slowly crawled towards the door and as soon as he reached it, Khali smashed it on Batista's spine, preventing him from escaping yet again. As the final cage door was now closed, the only way to win was by climbing out of both cages. Khali gained an advantage after pulling Batista off the inner cage wall and making him fall on his back. He had already reached the arena floor as Batista started to climb the inner cage and chase him. When Khali went over the top of the outer structure, Batista leapt from one cage to the other, overtook Khali on the way down, won the match and retained the title.

The main event was a Last Man Standing match for the WWE Championship in which in his third match of the night, Triple H defended the championship against Randy Orton. Both men fought extensively outside the ring, both taking advantage of the match stipulations, where there were no countouts or disqualifications. At one point, both men were positioned on top of one of the broadcast tables, where Orton attempted an RKO on Triple H, who countered the move and sent Orton through another of the broadcast tables. Triple H followed this by striking Orton with the steel steps. The men returned to the ring, and Orton performed a DDT and an RKO on Triple H, both onto a steel chair. The competitors returned to the outside of the ring again, and Triple H struck Orton with a chair. They returned to the top of the broadcast table, and Triple H attempted a Pedigree through the table on Orton, who countered into an RKO onto the table. The referee began a count and reached ten before Triple H could rise; as a result, Orton won the match and regained the WWE Championship.

== Reception ==
The event had an approximate attendance of 12,500, the maximum allowed. The event resulted in 271,000 pay-per-view buys, higher than the previous year's event. Canadian Online Explorer's professional wrestling section rated the entire event 7.5 out of 10 stars. The rating was higher than the No Mercy event in 2008, which was rated a 6 out of 10 stars. The Last Man Standing main event match from the Raw brand was rated a 9 out of 10 stars. The SmackDown! brand's main event, a Punjabi Prison match for the World Heavyweight Championship, was rated a 6 out of 10 stars.

The event was released on DVD on November 6, 2007. The DVD reached a peak position of nineteenth on Billboard's DVD sales chart for recreational sports on January 19, 2008. The average customer rating for the DVD from Amazon.com was four out of five stars.

== Aftermath ==
The next night on Raw, during an appreciation ceremony held by Vince McMahon for Randy Orton, Shawn Michaels returned from a five-month hiatus and superkicked Orton in the face to end the show. At Cyber Sunday, Michaels challenged Orton for the WWE Championship, but due to a low blow by Orton, Michaels won the match via disqualification, but Orton retained the title. At Survivor Series in November, Orton defeated Michaels in a match to retain his WWE Championship. That same month, on the November 16 episode of SmackDown!, Montel Vontavious Porter (MVP) and Matt Hardy lost the WWE Tag Team Championship in a match against John Morrison and The Miz.

Umaga lost the WWE Intercontinental Championship to Jeff Hardy on the September 3 episode of Raw. Afterwards, Umaga started a feud with Triple H, and they faced off in a Street Fight a month later at Cyber Sunday. At Cyber Sunday, CM Punk retained his title after defeating The Miz. The following month, at Survivor Series, Punk defeated Morrison and The Miz in a Triple Threat match to retain the ECW Championship.

Batista resumed his feud with The Undertaker, which led to a match against Batista at Cyber Sunday, with Steve Austin winning a fan poll to become the special guest referee. Batista won the match and retained the title. After Cyber Sunday, The Undertaker challenged Batista to a Hell in a Cell match at Survivor Series. Batista won the match following interference from Edge. As a result, Edge then became part of the rivalry, and the three men faced each other in a match at Armageddon. Edge won the match, and the championship, to end the feud.

Candice Michelle used her rematch clause for the Women's Championship on the October 22 episode of Raw in a two out of three falls match against Beth Phoenix. After Phoenix won the first pinfall, Candice failed to execute a move correctly from the top rope, causing her to fall on her neck, shoulder, and face. As a result, Candice suffered a legitimate cracked clavicle, and Phoenix retained the title.

== Results ==
No.	Results	Stipulations	Times
1^{D}	Hardcore Holly defeated Cody Rhodes	Singles match	5:00
2	Triple H defeated Randy Orton (c)	Singles match for the WWE Championship	11:15
3	Mr. Kennedy, Lance Cade and Trevor Murdoch defeated Jeff Hardy, Brian Kendrick and Paul London	Six-man tag team match	8:05
4	CM Punk (c) defeated Big Daddy V (with Matt Striker) by disqualification	Singles match for the ECW Championship	1:37
5	Triple H (c) defeated Umaga	Singles match for the WWE Championship	6:45
6	Finlay vs. Rey Mysterio ended in a no contest	Singles match	9:00
7	Beth Phoenix defeated Candice Michelle (c)	Singles match for the WWE Women's Championship	4:32
8	Batista (c) defeated The Great Khali (with Ranjin Singh)	Punjabi Prison match for the World Heavyweight Championship	14:47
9	Randy Orton defeated Triple H (c)	Last Man Standing match for the WWE Championship	22:00
(c) / – the champion(s) heading into the match; D / – this was a dark match
