= No Mercy (2005) =

World Wrestling Entertainment pay-per-view event

- Promotional poster featuring Eddie Guerrero
- Promotion: World Wrestling Entertainment
- Brand: SmackDown!
- Date: October 9, 2005
- City: Houston, Texas
- Venue: Toyota Center
- Attendance: 7,000
- Buy rate: 219,000

Pay-per-view chronology
← Previous; Unforgiven	Next → Taboo Tuesday

No Mercy chronology
← Previous; 2004	Next → 2006

The 2005 No Mercy was a professional wrestling pay-per-view (PPV) event produced by World Wrestling Entertainment (WWE). It was the eighth No Mercy and took place on October 9, 2005, at the Toyota Center in Houston, Texas, held exclusively for wrestlers from the promotion's SmackDown! brand division. Nine professional wrestling matches were scheduled on the event's card.

Three of the four championships exclusive to the SmackDown! brand were contested for; one was lost while the other two were retained. The main event was a standard wrestling match, in which World Heavyweight Champion Batista defeated challenger Eddie Guerrero to retain his title. This would be Guerrero's final pay-per-view match before his sudden death one month later (coincidentally, the event took place on Guerrero's 38th birthday). One of the featured preliminary matches was a casket match between The Ortons (Randy and "Cowboy" Bob) and The Undertaker. The Ortons won the match after placing Undertaker inside the casket and closing it. Another primary preliminary match was a standard match between John "Bradshaw" Layfield (JBL) and Rey Mysterio, which JBL won.

The event received 219,000 pay-per-view buys, which was greater than the 193,000 buys the previous year's event received. The event was claimed to be "unmerciful" by Canadian Online Explorer's professional wrestling section, as they rated none of the matches higher than a five out of ten. When the event was released on DVD, it reached a peak position of fourth on Billboard's DVD sales chart for recreational sports. It remained on the chart for four consecutive weeks.

== Production ==
=== Background ===
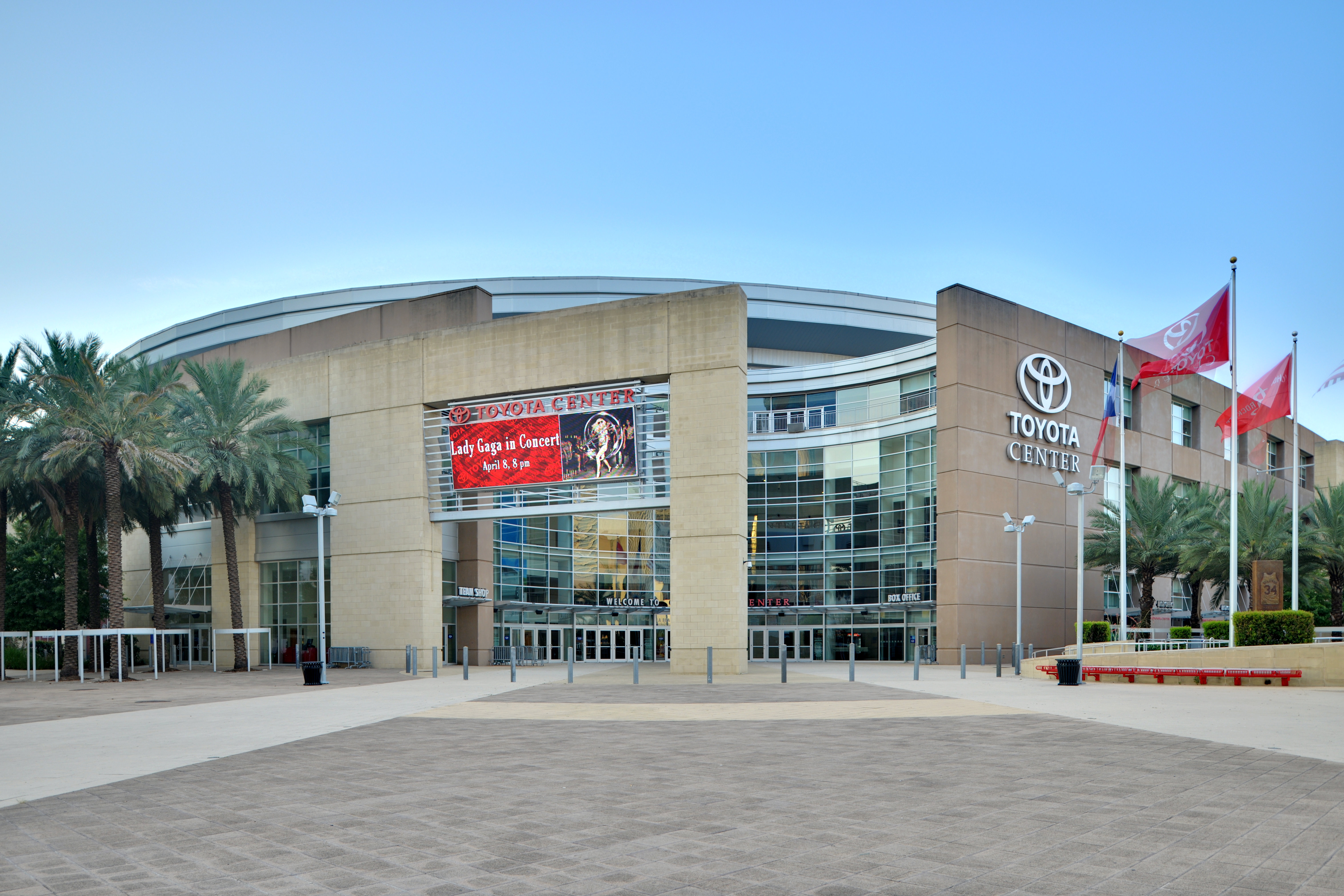
The eighth No Mercy was held at the Toyota Center in Houston, Texas.

No Mercy was first held by World Wrestling Entertainment (WWE) as a United Kingdom-exclusive professional wrestling pay-per-view (PPV) event in May 1999. A second No Mercy was then held later that same year in October, but in the United States, which established No Mercy as the annual October PPV for the promotion. The eighth event was held on October 9, 2005, at the Toyota Center in Houston, Texas. Like the previous two years, it featured wrestlers exclusively from the SmackDown! brand.

=== Storylines ===
The event included nine matches that resulted from scripted storylines. Results were predetermined by WWE's writers on the SmackDown! brand, while storylines were produced on WWE's weekly television show, SmackDown!.

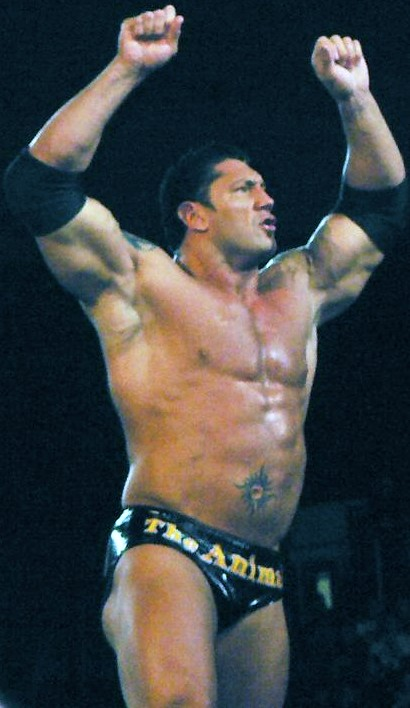
Batista, who defended the World Heavyweight Championship against Eddie Guerrero

The main rivalry heading into No Mercy was between Batista and Eddie Guerrero over the World Heavyweight Championship. On the September 16 episode of SmackDown!, Palmer Canon announced that Guerrero was the next challenger to Batista's World Heavyweight Championship. Guerrero came out and claimed he was now more about compassion than manipulation. Two weeks later, on the September 30 episode of SmackDown!, Guerrero accidentally hit Batista with a folding chair while attempting to hit MNM tag team member Joey Mercury. The following week, Batista showed Guerrero the footage of him hitting Batista last week. Batista then proclaimed that he would hurt Guerrero if he were to become manipulative again.

The feud between The Undertaker and Randy Orton and "Cowboy" Bob Orton began at SummerSlam. At SummerSlam, Randy faced off against The Undertaker. During the match, "Cowboy" Bob (disguised as a fan) came into the ring and interrupted the match. Following this, Randy pinned The Undertaker after an RKO to win. After the match, Randy peeled off the latex mask of the fan and revealed him to be his father, "Cowboy" Bob. On the September 16 episode of SmackDown!, The Undertaker defeated Randy. During the match, "Cowboy" Bob drove a U-Haul truck down to the ring and unloaded a casket. As The Undertaker went to put Randy inside the casket, he opened it and found a mannequin of himself inside. Despite this distraction, The Undertaker pinned Randy after he hit him with the Tombstone Piledriver. The following week, druids wheeled out a casket. The Undertaker appeared on the TitanTron and urged The Ortons to look inside. The Ortons opened the casket and found mannequins of themselves inside. The Undertaker then proclaimed that this would be their fate at No Mercy.

At the previous SmackDown! brand pay-per-view event, The Great American Bash, The Legion of Doom (Road Warrior Animal and Heidenreich) defeated MNM (Joey Mercury and Johnny Nitro) to win the WWE Tag Team Championship. After both teams got involved in a storyline between Melina (Melina Perez), who was also a member of MNM, and Christy Hemme, The Legion of Doom and Hemme versus MNM was announced for No Mercy.

The storyline over the WWE United States Championship began when Booker T, Orlando Jordan, and Christian each explained why they thought they deserved a title match against the champion, Chris Benoit. Theodore Long, SmackDown!'s on-screen general manager, then announced that Benoit could choose who he wanted to face for the title. After Jordan won a triple threat match, also involving Booker T and Christian, Benoit decided that he would face all three men in a fatal four-way match between the four at No Mercy.

== Event ==
Before the live broadcast of the event began, William Regal and Paul Burchill defeated Paul London and Brian Kendrick in a tag team match that aired on the Sunday Night Heat pre-show.

=== Preliminary matches ===
Other on-screen personnel
Role:	Name:
English commentators	Michael Cole
English commentators	Tazz
Spanish commentators	Carlos Cabrera
Spanish commentators	Hugo Savinovich
Interviewer	Steve Romero
Ring announcer	Tony Chimel
Referees	Nick Patrick
Referees	Charles Robinson
Referees	Brian Hebner
Referees	Jim Korderas

The first match of the event was The Legion of Doom (Animal and Heidenreich) and Christy Hemme taking on MNM (Joey Mercury, Johnny Nitro, and Melina) in a six-person tag team match. After a match predominately controlled by MNM, Hemme pinned Melina after executing a Doomsday Device to win the match for her team.

In the next match, Bobby Lashley, who made his WWE pay-per-view debut, faced Simon Dean. Lashley won the match in under two minutes after pinning Dean after a Dominator. Lashley forced Dean to eat 20 double cheeseburgers as the show progressed.

The third contest was a fatal four-way in which Chris Benoit defended the United States Championship against Booker T, Christian, and Orlando Jordan. After a match evenly controlled by all four men, Benoit forced Christian to submit with the sharpshooter submission hold to win the match and retain the title.

In the next match, Mr. Kennedy faced Hardcore Holly. Kennedy controlled most of the match, as he attacked and applied various submission holds on Holly's arm. Kennedy pinned Holly after he performed a Green Bay Plunge off the top rope.

In the next match, John "Bradshaw" Layfield (JBL) faced Rey Mysterio. The match went back and forth, as each man gained the advantage many times. JBL pinned Mysterio after a Clothesline from Hell to win.

=== Main event matches ===
The sixth bout on the card was a casket match between The Ortons (Randy and "Cowboy" Bob) and The Undertaker. Near the end of the match, The Undertaker had placed "Cowboy" Bob in the casket and was attempting to place Randy in it as well. After performing a Last Ride on Randy, The Undertaker went to open the casket. As he did, however, "Cowboy" Bob sprayed a fire extinguisher in his eyes. Randy then hit The Undertaker with a folding chair and placed him in the casket. The Ortons closed the casket to win the bout. After the match, The Ortons locked The Undertaker in the casket and hit it numerous times with an axe. They then poured gasoline on the casket and lit it on fire (just like Kane did at the 1998 Royal Rumble).

The next match saw WWE Cruiserweight Champion Nunzio defend his title against Juventud. After a back and forth match between the two, Juventud pinned Nunzio after a sit-out scoop slam piledriver to win the match and the Cruiserweight Championship.

Next was the main event, which saw Batista defend the World Heavyweight Championship against Eddie Guerrero. Towards the end of the match, Guerrero executed three vertical suplexes, and attempted to perform a Frog Splash. Batista, however, rolled out of the way and performed a Spinebuster. Batista pinned Guerrero afterwards to win the match and retain the World Heavyweight Championship. After the match, Batista and the crowd at the arena sang "Happy Birthday" to Guerrero due to the event taking place on Guerrero's 38th birthday.

== Reception ==
The event received 219,000 pay-per-view buys, which was greater than the 193,000 buys the previous year's event received. The promotion's revenue was $18.8 million, which was greater than the previous year's revenue of $18.5 million. Canadian Online Explorer's professional wrestling section claimed the event was "unmerciful" and that it left fans "begging for mercy". They rated the overall event, as well as the main event, a five out of ten. None of the matches received a rating higher than a five out of 10. The match between Bobby Lashley and Simon Dean was rated a three out of 10, the lowest overall.

The event was released on DVD on November 8, 2005. The DVD reached a peak position of fourth on Billboard's DVD sales chart for recreational sports on December 3, 2005. It remained on the chart for four consecutive weeks, until December 24, when it ranked ninth.

== Aftermath ==
The rivalry between Batista and Eddie Guerrero ended after Guerrero unexpectedly died due to heart failure on November 13, 2005. Their feud was planned to continue, as Guerrero would have gone back to his villainous character and win the World Heavyweight Championship.

The Undertaker would not be seen on-screen until Survivor Series after being burned inside a casket at the event. After being the sole survivor in his elimination match, Randy Orton, who took Guerrero's place on the team, celebrated his victory with his father, "Cowboy" Bob Orton, and wrestlers from the SmackDown! brand. During the celebration, druids brought out a casket and set it up in an upright position. Lightning then struck the casket and set it on fire. The Undertaker emerged from the flaming casket and attacked the SmackDown wrestlers. The Ortons, however, escaped the attack. This set up a Hell in a Cell match between Randy and The Undertaker at Armageddon. The Undertaker defeated Randy and ended their storyline that had lasted nearly one year.

After successfully retaining the WWE United States Championship at the event, Chris Benoit started a rivalry with Booker T. Booker T defeated Benoit for the title on the October 21 edition of SmackDown! to begin their feud. The following month, on the November 24 edition of SmackDown!, a match between Benoit and Booker T for the title ended in a no-contest after both men's shoulders were on the mat while pinning one another. Theodore Long then vacated the title and announced that the two would face off against one another in a "Best of Seven series" for the title, in which the winner would be the man who won four matches over the other first. Booker T defeated Benoit in the first match at Survivor Series, and eventually won the vacant title after Randy Orton, Booker T's replacement due to a legitimate injury to his ankle at a house show, defeated Benoit in the seventh and final match in January. Booker T began his fourth reign as United States Champion.

== Results ==
No.	Results	Stipulations	Times
1^{H}	Paul Burchill and William Regal defeated Brian Kendrick and Paul London by pinfall	Tag team match	3:58
2	Christy Hemme and The Legion of Doom (Animal and Heidenreich) defeated MNM (Joey Mercury, Johnny Nitro and Melina) by pinfall	Six-person mixed tag team match	6:25
3	Bobby Lashley defeated Simon Dean by pinfall	Singles match	1:55
4	Chris Benoit (c) defeated Booker T (with Sharmell), Christian, and Orlando Jordan by pinfall	Fatal four-way match for the WWE United States Championship	10:22
5	Mr. Kennedy defeated Hardcore Holly by pinfall	Singles match	8:49
6	John "Bradshaw" Layfield (with Jillian Hall) defeated Rey Mysterio by pinfall	Singles match	13:24
7	Randy Orton and Bob Orton defeated The Undertaker	Handicap Casket match	19:16
8	Juventud (with Psicosis and Super Crazy) defeated Nunzio (c) (with Vito) by pinfall	Singles match for the WWE Cruiserweight Championship	6:49
9	Batista (c) defeated Eddie Guerrero by pinfall	Singles match for the World Heavyweight Championship	18:40
(c) / – the champion(s) heading into the match; H / – the match was broadcast prior to the pay-per-view on Sunday Night Heat
