= No Mercy (2003) =

World Wrestling Entertainment pay-per-view event

- Promotional poster featuring Brock Lesnar preparing to deliver an F-5 to The Rock at SummerSlam 2002
- Promotion: World Wrestling Entertainment
- Brand: SmackDown!
- Date: October 19, 2003
- City: Baltimore, Maryland
- Venue: 1st Mariner Arena
- Attendance: 8,500
- Buy rate: 254,000

Pay-per-view chronology
← Previous; Unforgiven	Next → Survivor Series

No Mercy chronology
← Previous; 2002	Next → 2004

The 2003 No Mercy was a professional wrestling pay-per-view (PPV) event produced by World Wrestling Entertainment (WWE). It was the sixth No Mercy and took place on October 19, 2003, at the 1st Mariner Arena in Baltimore, Maryland. It was held exclusively for wrestlers from the promotion's SmackDown! brand division, which made it the first brand-exclusive No Mercy after the previous year's event also featured wrestlers from Raw.

Nine professional wrestling matches were scheduled on the event's card. The main event saw WWE Champion Brock Lesnar defeat The Undertaker to retain his championship in a match where a chain was hung from a pole and the first man to reach it could use it as a legal weapon in what was called a Biker Chain match. Two featured bouts were scheduled on the undercard. In a standard match for the WWE United States Championship, Big Show defeated Eddie Guerrero to win the title. The other was also a standard match, in which Kurt Angle defeated John Cena.

No Mercy had an attendance of approximately 8,500 and received about 254,000 pay-per-view buys, more than the following year's event. This event helped WWE increase its pay-per-view revenue by $6.2 million from the previous year. When the event was released on DVD, it reached a peak position of seventh on Billboard's DVD Sales Chart.

== Production ==
=== Background ===
No Mercy was first held by World Wrestling Entertainment (WWE) as a United Kingdom-exclusive professional wrestling pay-per-view (PPV) in May 1999. A second No Mercy was then held later that same year in October, but in the United States, which established No Mercy as the annual October PPV for the promotion. The sixth event was held on October 19, 2003, at the 1st Mariner Arena in Baltimore, Maryland. While the previous year's event featured wrestlers from both the Raw and SmackDown! brands, the 2003 event was held exclusively for SmackDown!, which made it the first brand-exclusive No Mercy.

=== Storylines ===
The event featured nine professional wrestling matches with outcomes predetermined by WWE script writers. The matches featured wrestlers portraying their characters in planned storylines that took place before, during and after the event. All wrestlers were from the SmackDown! brand, a storyline division in which WWE assigned its employees.

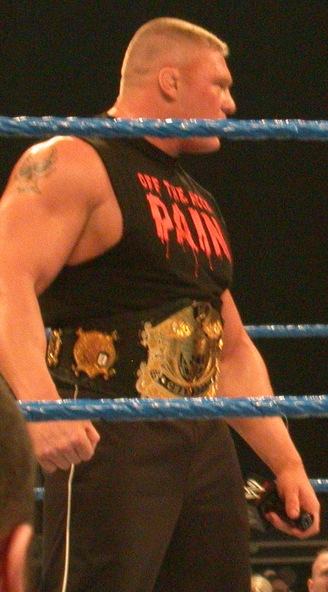
Brock Lesnar as WWE Champion

The main event at No Mercy was a Biker Chain match for the WWE Championship. In this match, a chain was hung on a pole above the ring, and when it was retrieved it could be used as a legal weapon. The match was between WWE Champion Brock Lesnar, who defended against The Undertaker. The buildup to the match began on the August 28 episode of SmackDown!, when The Undertaker defeated Lesnar and Big Show in a Triple Threat match, earning a title shot against then WWE Champion Kurt Angle. On the September 4 episode of SmackDown!, Angle defended the championship against The Undertaker, however, the match ended in a no contest after Lesnar interfered and attacked them both with a steel folding chair; Angle retained the championship as a result of Lesnar's interference. On the September 18 episode of SmackDown!, Angle defended the title against Lesnar in a 60-minute Iron Man match. Lesnar scored five falls, while Angle scored four, thus, Lesnar won the match and became the new WWE Champion. On the September 25 episode of SmackDown!, WWE Chairman Vince McMahon held a ceremony to introduce the new WWE Champion Lesnar, but was interrupted by The Undertaker and SmackDown! General manager Stephanie McMahon, who announced that Lesnar would face The Undertaker at No Mercy for the WWE Championship. On the October 9 episode of SmackDown!, Lesnar defended the title against Paul London. The match was interrupted by The Undertaker, who had a meeting with Stephanie earlier that night. The Undertaker announced that his match with Lesnar at No Mercy would be a Biker Chain Match.

One of the featured bouts on the undercard saw the WWE United States Champion Eddie Guerrero defending the championship against Big Show. The events leading up to this match began on the October 9 episode of SmackDown!, when it was announced that Guerrero would face Big Show at No Mercy for the title. Later in the night, Chavo Guerrero brought Big Show out to the ring, followed by Eddie bringing a sewage truck into the arena and spraying Big Show with raw sewage. On the October 16 episode of SmackDown!, Guerrero defeated Rhyno in a non-title match. Afterwards, Big Show attacked Guerrero by using his signature lowrider as a weapon.

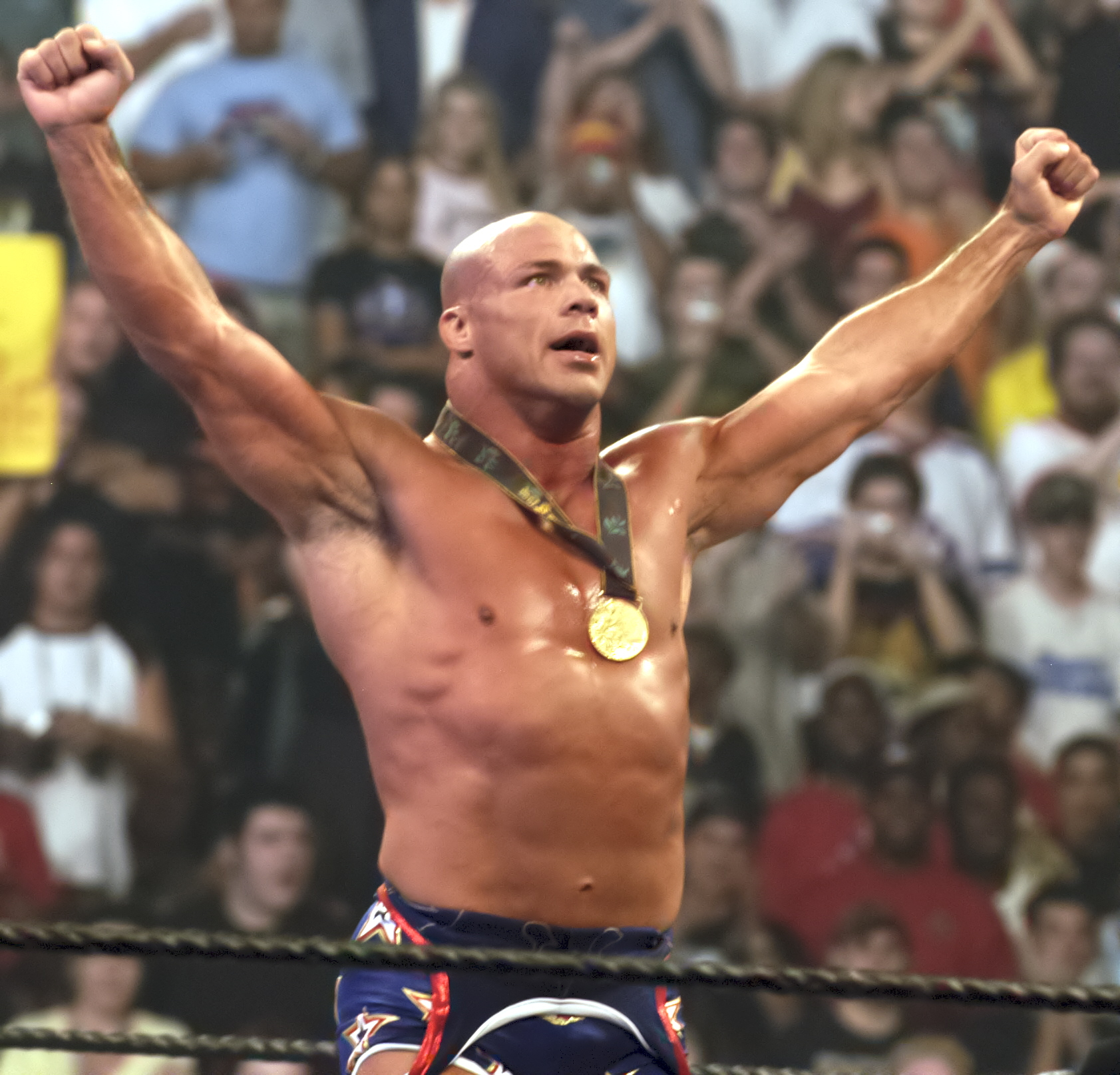
Kurt Angle, who faced John Cena at No Mercy

Another featured bout on the undercard pitted Kurt Angle against John Cena. On the September 18 episode of SmackDown!, Angle lost an Iron Man match to Brock Lesnar for the WWE Championship. The match marked the third time that Angle defended the title against Lesnar with the first being WrestleMania XIX where Lesnar won the title and the second being SummerSlam which Angle retained. On the September 25 episode of SmackDown!, Angle tried to call Lesnar out to the ring, demanding a rematch, but instead Cena came to the ring and attacked Angle. On the October 2 episode of SmackDown!, Lesnar and Cena faced the team of Angle and The Undertaker, which Cena and Lesnar won after Cena struck Angle with a chain. On the October 9 episode of SmackDown!, a rap battle took place between Cena and Angle, in which both men performed raps insulting each other. The battle ended with Angle attacking Cena and the two proceeding to fight in the ring.

Another prominent match on the card was an "I Quit" match between Vince McMahon and his daughter, Stephanie McMahon. At No Mercy, however, Vince announced that Stephanie could score a pinfall or submission to win the match. The match build up began on the September 25 episode of SmackDown!, when Stephanie interrupted her father's ceremony honoring the new WWE Champion Brock Lesnar to announce that the Undertaker would face Lesnar at No Mercy for the championship. Vince, angered by this, demanded that she retract the decision. When Stephanie did not, Vince announced that the two of them would face each other in an "I Quit" match at No Mercy. On the October 2 episode of SmackDown!, Vince offered Stephanie another chance to rescind the title match, which she refused and as a result Vince added the stipulation that if she lost, she would be forced to resign as the general manager of SmackDown!. On the October 9 episode of SmackDown!, Linda McMahon made Vince agree that if he lost the match, he would resign as WWE chairman.

== Event ==
Other on-screen personnel
Role:	Name:
English commentators	Michael Cole
English commentators	Tazz
Spanish commentators	Carlos Cabrera
Spanish commentators	Hugo Savinovich
Interviewer	Josh Mathews
Ring announcer	Tony Chimel
Referees	Nick Patrick
Referees	Brian Hebner
Referees	Jim Korderas
Referees	Mike Sparks

=== Sunday Night Heat ===
Before No Mercy aired live on pay-per-view, Billy Kidman faced Shannon Moore on Sunday Night Heat, one of WWE's secondary television programs. Kidman won via pinfall after a spinebuster on Moore.

=== Preliminary matches ===
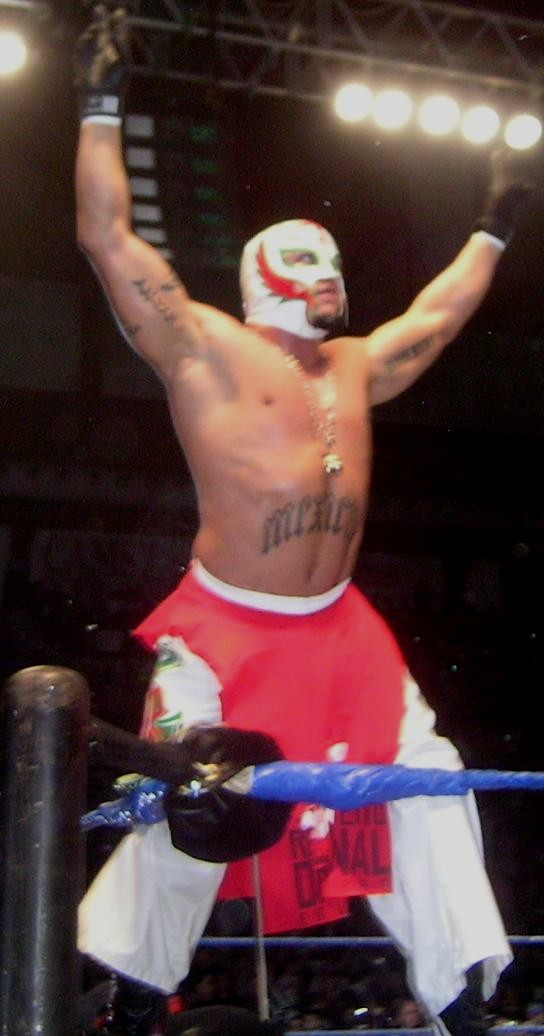
Rey Mysterio faced Tajiri for the WWE Cruiserweight Championship

As No Mercy began Rey Mysterio faced Tajiri for the WWE Cruiserweight Championship. Throughout the match, both men performed many offensive maneuvers but Mysterio gained the upper hand when he performed a 619 and West Coast Pop. Before Mysterio could pin Tajiri, two "fans" (later revealed to be Ryan Sakoda and James Yun) interfered and distracted Mysterio. Following the distraction, Tajiri performed a Buzzsaw kick on Mysterio to retain the title.

In the next match, Chris Benoit faced A-Train. Both men wrestled inconclusively in the early stages of the match, until Benoit performed a dragon screw legwhip on A-Train and forced A-Train to submit to the Sharpshooter to win.

The third contest had Zach Gowen facing Matt Hardy. Both men performed a variety of moves on one another until Gowen performed a springboard moonsault with one leg on Hardy for the win.

In the next match, the Basham Brothers (Doug Basham and Danny Basham) faced the Acolytes Protection Agency (Bradshaw and Faarooq). After both teams performed a number of offensive maneuvers on each other, Shaniqua, the Basham Brothers' valet, struck Bradshaw with a club. Doug then covered pinned Bradshaw.

=== Main event matches ===
The fifth contest was an "I Quit" match between WWE Chairman Vince McMahon, escorted by Sable, and SmackDown! General manager Stephanie McMahon, his daughter. Stephanie was accompanied to the ring by her mother, Linda McMahon. Vince had altered the rules of the match, including the stipulation that Stephanie could defeat him by pinfall or submission, but he had to force her to quit. Furthermore, the loser of the match had to surrender their position in the company (chairman or SmackDown! general manager for Vince and Stephanie, respectively). The match ended when Vince made Stephanie pass out, by choking her out with a lead pipe. Linda quit the match for Stephanie by throwing in the towel, and as a result, Stephanie was removed from the position of general manager of SmackDown!.

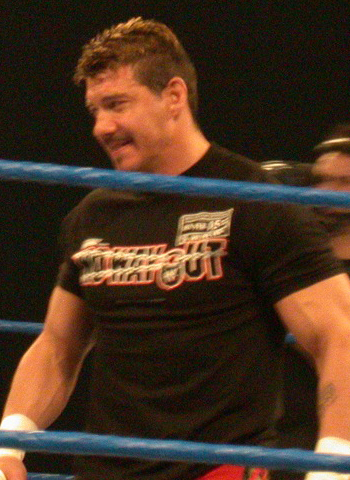
Eddie Guerrero defended the United States Championship against Big Show

The first featured bout was a standard match between Kurt Angle and John Cena. Angle began bleeding internally after Cena performed a DDT on the ring apron on him. Later in the match, Cena attempted a FU but Angle reversed it into an unsuccessful cover attempt. Following that, Angle attempted an Angle Slam but Cena countered the maneuver. Cena later gave Angle an FU for a near fall and Angle gave Cena an Angle Slam for a near fall. Angle then countered Cena and applied an ankle lock, which led to Cena submitting.

The second featured bout on the undercard was a standard match for the WWE United States Championship between Eddie Guerrero, and Big Show. Guerrero used a variety of tactics including forcing Big Show's head into an exposed turnbuckle, striking him with a trash can lid, punching him with brass knuckles and striking him with the title belt. After hitting Big Show with the belt, Guerrero performed a frog splash for a near-fall. Big Show then performed a chokeslam but Guerrero placed his foot on the rope. Big Show then performed another chokeslam on Guerrero to win the title.

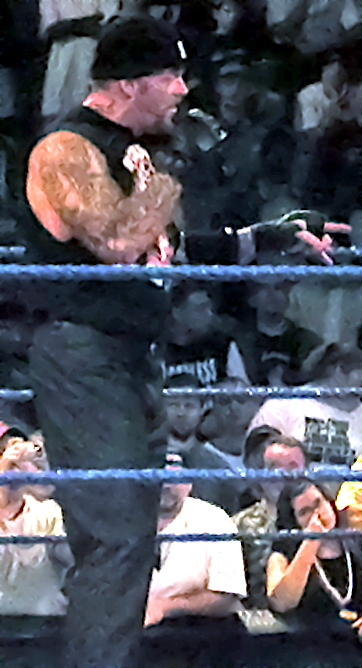
The Undertaker, who faced Brock Lesnar for the WWE Championship in a Biker Chain match

The main event was a Biker Chain match for the WWE Championship between Brock Lesnar and The Undertaker. During the match, a chain was hung on a pole above the ring, and once it was retrieved it could be used as a legal weapon. After enduring a series of punches from Lesnar, The Undertaker attempted to take the chain down, but the lights in the arena went out and he climbed back down to the ring. The Undertaker then executed a piledriver on Lesnar onto the ring steps. The Undertaker put Lesnar in a dragon sleeper. After getting out of the hold, Lesnar executed a F-5 to The Undertaker. Lesnar made an attempt to go for the chain, but The Undertaker performed a chokeslam off the top rope. Following this, The Full Blooded Italians interfered in the match, trying to attack The Undertaker. The Undertaker threw them out of the ring and did a suicide dive onto them after performing a Last Ride on Lesnar. He then retrieved the chain off the pole and wrapped it around it his fist, planning to strike Lesnar with it. Vince McMahon interfered and pushed The Undertaker off the top rope. Lesnar then hit The Undertaker with the biker chain and pinned The Undertaker to retain the title.

== Reception ==
The 1st Mariner Arena usually can accommodate 14,000, but the capacity was reduced for No Mercy. This event had an approximate attendance of 8,500 and received 254,000 pay-per-view buys. The promotion's pay-per-view revenue was $24.7 million. The professional wrestling section of the Canadian Online Explorer website rated the entire event a 4 out of 10 stars. The rating was lower than the 2004 event's rating of 5 out of 10 stars. The encounter between Kurt Angle and John Cena was given the highest rating of any match on the card with a 7.5 out of 10 stars, while the United States Championship match was rated a 3 out of 10 stars. The main event match for the WWE Championship was rated a 7 out of 10 stars.

The event was released on DVD on November 18, 2003 by Sony Music Entertainment. The DVD reached seventh on Billboard's DVD Sales Chart for recreational sports during the week of December 13, 2003, although falling thereafter. It remained on the chart until the week of December 20, ranking twelfth.

== Aftermath ==
As a result of losing her match against her father, Stephanie McMahon was forced to resign as SmackDown! General Manager. On the SmackDown! following No Mercy, Vince McMahon announced Paul Heyman as the new general manager. Heyman booked a Handicap match, in which The Undertaker faced Brock Lesnar and the Big Show. Heyman stated that should The Undertaker win, he could face anyone he wished at Survivor Series. During the match, there were several opportunities in which The Undertaker would have won the match, but Heyman restarted the contest three times. The Undertaker did, however, win the contest, and announced he wanted a Buried Alive match against Vince McMahon. McMahon would go on to win the match with the aid of The Undertaker's half-brother Kane.

The feud between Kurt Angle and Cena ended shortly after No Mercy. On the November 6 episode of SmackDown!, John Cena was offered an opportunity to become the final member of Team Lesnar for the traditional five-on-five elimination tag match at Survivor Series. Cena rejected the offer, however, causing A-Train to turn on him and reveal he was the final member of Team Lesnar. The members of Team Angle fought alongside Cena, and the following week on SmackDown, Cena turned into a fan favorite and joined Kurt Angle's Survivor Series team. The feud between the Big Show and Eddie Guerrero ended after No Mercy, with Guerrero going on to compete for the WWE Tag Team Championship with Chavo Guerrero. Guerrero went on to win a tag team title shot by defeating the Basham Brothers in a Handicap match, but he did not win the title.

== Results ==
No.	Results	Stipulations	Times
1^{H}	Billy Kidman defeated Shannon Moore	Singles match	5:12
2	Tajiri (c) defeated Rey Mysterio	Singles match for the WWE Cruiserweight Championship	11:40
3	Chris Benoit defeated A-Train	Singles match	12:21
4	Zach Gowen defeated Matt Hardy	Singles match	5:33
5	The Basham Brothers (Doug and Danny) defeated The APA (Faarooq and Bradshaw)	Tag team match	8:55
6	Mr. McMahon (with Sable) defeated Stephanie McMahon (with Linda McMahon) by technical knockout	"I Quit" Loser Gets Fired match	9:24
7	Kurt Angle defeated John Cena	Singles match	18:28
8	Big Show defeated Eddie Guerrero (c)	Singles match for the WWE United States Championship	11:27
9	Brock Lesnar (c) defeated The Undertaker	Biker Chain match for the WWE Championship	24:14
(c) / – the champion(s) heading into the match; H / – the match was broadcast prior to the pay-per-view on Sunday Night Heat
