= No Mercy (2004) =

World Wrestling Entertainment pay-per-view event

- Promotional poster featuring John "Bradshaw" Layfield
- Promotion: World Wrestling Entertainment
- Brand: SmackDown!
- Date: October 3, 2004
- City: East Rutherford, New Jersey
- Venue: Continental Airlines Arena
- Attendance: 10,000
- Buy rate: 240,000

Pay-per-view chronology
← Previous; Unforgiven	Next → Taboo Tuesday

No Mercy chronology
← Previous; 2003	Next → 2005

The 2004 No Mercy was a professional wrestling pay-per-view (PPV) event produced by World Wrestling Entertainment (WWE). It was the seventh No Mercy and took place on October 3, 2004, at the Continental Airlines Arena in East Rutherford, New Jersey, held exclusively for wrestlers from the promotion's SmackDown! brand division. Eight professional wrestling matches were contested on the event's card.

The main event was a Last Ride match, where the objective was to place an opponent in a hearse located on the entrance stage and drive them out of the arena. WWE Champion John "Bradshaw" Layfield (JBL) defeated The Undertaker in this match to retain his title. Two predominant bouts were featured on the undercard; in respective singles matches, John Cena defeated Booker T to win the WWE United States Championship, and The Big Show defeated Kurt Angle.

No Mercy grossed over US$700,000 ticket sales from an attendance of 10,000, and received 240,000 pay-per-view buys. This event helped WWE increase its pay-per-view revenue by $6.2 compared to the previous year.

== Production ==
=== Background ===
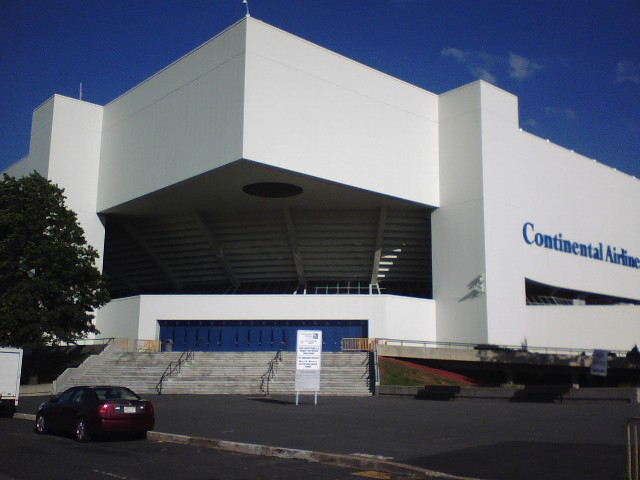
The event was held at the Continental Airlines Arena in East Rutherford, New Jersey.

No Mercy was first held by World Wrestling Entertainment (WWE) as a United Kingdom-exclusive professional wrestling pay-per-view (PPV) event in May 1999. A second No Mercy was then held later that same year in October, but in the United States, which established No Mercy as the annual October PPV for the promotion. The seventh event was held on October 3, 2004, at the Continental Airlines Arena in East Rutherford, New Jersey. Like the previous year, it featured wrestlers exclusively from the SmackDown! brand.

=== Storylines ===
The event featured eight professional wrestling matches that involved different wrestlers from pre-existing scripted feuds, plots and storylines. Wrestlers portrayed either a villainous or fan favorite gimmick as they followed a series of events which generally built tension, leading to a wrestling match. All wrestlers were from the SmackDown! brand – a storyline division in which WWE assigned its employees to a different program, the other being Raw.

John "Bradshaw" Layfield as WWE Champion

The main event featured WWE Champion John "Bradshaw" Layfield (JBL) defending the title against The Undertaker in a Last Ride match. The buildup to the match began after SummerSlam, where JBL defeated The Undertaker in a singles match via disqualification to retain his championship. On the August 19 episode of SmackDown!, JBL wore a neck brace, to signify that he was recuperating from a chokeslam that The Undertaker gave him on top of his limo. On the August 26 episode of SmackDown!, Orlando Jordan, JBL's chief of staff, defended the WWE Championship for JBL against The Undertaker. The Undertaker won the match via disqualification following interference from JBL; as a result, JBL retained the title. On the September 9 episode of SmackDown!, SmackDown! General Manager Theodore Long announced that The Undertaker would get another opportunity for JBL's title at No Mercy in a Last Ride match.

One of the featured matches was contested for the WWE United States Championship, in which Booker T defended the title against John Cena. At SummerSlam, Cena defeated Booker T in the first match of a "best of five" series. On the August 26 episode of SmackDown!, the second match was won by Booker T, to even the series one-to-one. On August 27 at a SmackDown! live event, Booker T defeated Cena to win the third match. On the September 16 episode of SmackDown!, Cena defeated Booker T in the fourth match, making the series even at two wins apiece. On the September 23 episode of SmackDown!, it was announced that the final series match would be scheduled at No Mercy.

The other featured preliminary match was Kurt Angle versus The Big Show in a singles match. The buildup to the match began on the September 9 episode of SmackDown!, where a Lumberjack match was scheduled between Angle and Eddie Guerrero. The match ended in a no contest when Big Show returned after a five-month absence by interfering in the match, chokeslamming both Angle and Guerrero in the process. On the September 16 episode of SmackDown!, Big Show was given two contracts to choose from; one contract to face Guerrero and one contract to face Angle. Smackdown General Manager Theodore Long announced that Luther Reigns and Mark Jindrak will be banned from ringside and if anyone interferes in the match, they will be fired. Big Show signed the contract with Guerrero's name on it. After signing it, Angle and his associate Luther Reigns, threw Guerrero out of the ring and offered Big Show a handshake. Big Show, however, tore up Guerrero's contract and signed the one with Angle's name on it to face him at No Mercy.

== Event ==
Other on-screen personnel
Role:	Name:
English commentators	Michael Cole
English commentators	Tazz
Spanish commentators	Carlos Cabrera
Spanish commentators	Hugo Savinovich
Interviewer	Josh Mathews
Ring announcer	Tony Chimel
Referees	Nick Patrick
Referees	Charles Robinson
Referees	Jim Korderas

Before the event went live on pay-per-view, Mark Jindrak defeated Scotty 2 Hotty in a match taped for Heat, one of WWE's secondary television programs.

=== Preliminary matches ===
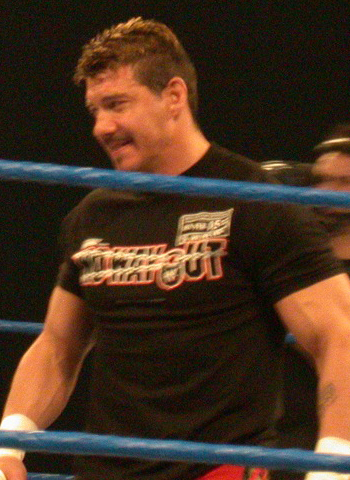
Eddie Guerrero faced Luther Reigns

The first match was between Eddie Guerrero and Luther Reigns. In the early stages, both competitors took the advantage over one another. Reigns controlled most of the match, as Guerrero tried to avoid Reigns' assaults. Guerrero won the match after attacking Reigns with a baton taken from a security guard.

The next match was for the WWE Cruiserweight Championship between Spike Dudley and Nunzio. The match began with Nunzio performing a pescado on Spike. The match saw interference from D-Von Dudley as he pushed Nunzio off the top rope. The match ended when Johnny Stamboli tried to prevent interference from D-Von, allowing Bubba Ray to crotch Nunzio on the ring post, allowing Spike to pin him to retain the title.

The next match was between Billy Kidman and Paul London. The start of the match saw London perform a running springboard moonsault on Kidman. Kidman took control once back in the ring, as he focused on London's lower back. London attempted to perform a powerbomb but Kidman countered with a sitout facebuster for a near-fall. The match concluded when Kidman executed a Shooting star press on London for the win.

The fourth match was for the WWE Tag Team Championship between the team of René Duprée and Kenzo Suzuki and the team of Rob Van Dam and Rey Mysterio. The match began with Van Dam and Duprée gaining the advantage. Mysterio was tagged in the match and performed a diving headbutt, a tornado DDT and a seated senton on Suzuki. Mysterio performed the 619 on Suzuki and attempted the West Coast Pop but Duprée pulled Mysterio off the ropes. Suzuki pinned Mysterio using the ropes to retain the titles.

=== Main event matches ===
The first main match was between Kurt Angle and Big Show. The stipulation is that Mark Jindrak and Luther Reigns were banned from ringside and if anyone interfered in the match they would be fired. For the duration of the match, Big Show, who stood at 7 feet (2.1 m) squashed Angle. Angle was intentionally counted out but General Manager Theodore Long ordered Angle to continue the match or Angle would never wrestle on SmackDown! again. After Angle returned to the ring, Big Show continued to squash Angle. Angle retrieved a steel chair but Big Show punched the chair onto Angle's face. As Big Show prepared to perform a chokeslam, Angle countered into an ankle lock. While Big Show reached the ropes to force Angle to break the hold, the referee was knocked down. Angle began targeting Big Show's knee and hit his knee with the chair. The match ended with Big Show chokeslamming Angle from the top rope for the win.

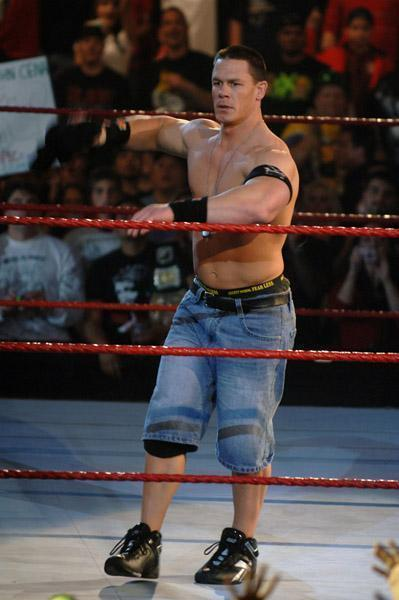
John Cena faced Booker T for the United States Championship

The second main match was for the WWE United States Championship between Booker T and John Cena in the final "best of five" match. In the early stages of the match, Cena and Booker T fought at ringside. Cena took control as he performed a One-handed bulldog and a Five knuckle shuffle. Cena attempted an FU but Booker T countered with a Book End for a near-fall. Cena was able to dodge a Scissors Kick and executed the FU to win the title.

Next was a mixed tag team match between The Dudley Boyz (Bubba Ray Dudley and D-Von Dudley) and Dawn Marie versus Charlie Haas, Rico Constantino, and Miss Jackie. The match ended when Haas performed a pointed elbow drop and tagged in Rico, who performed a moonsault for the win.

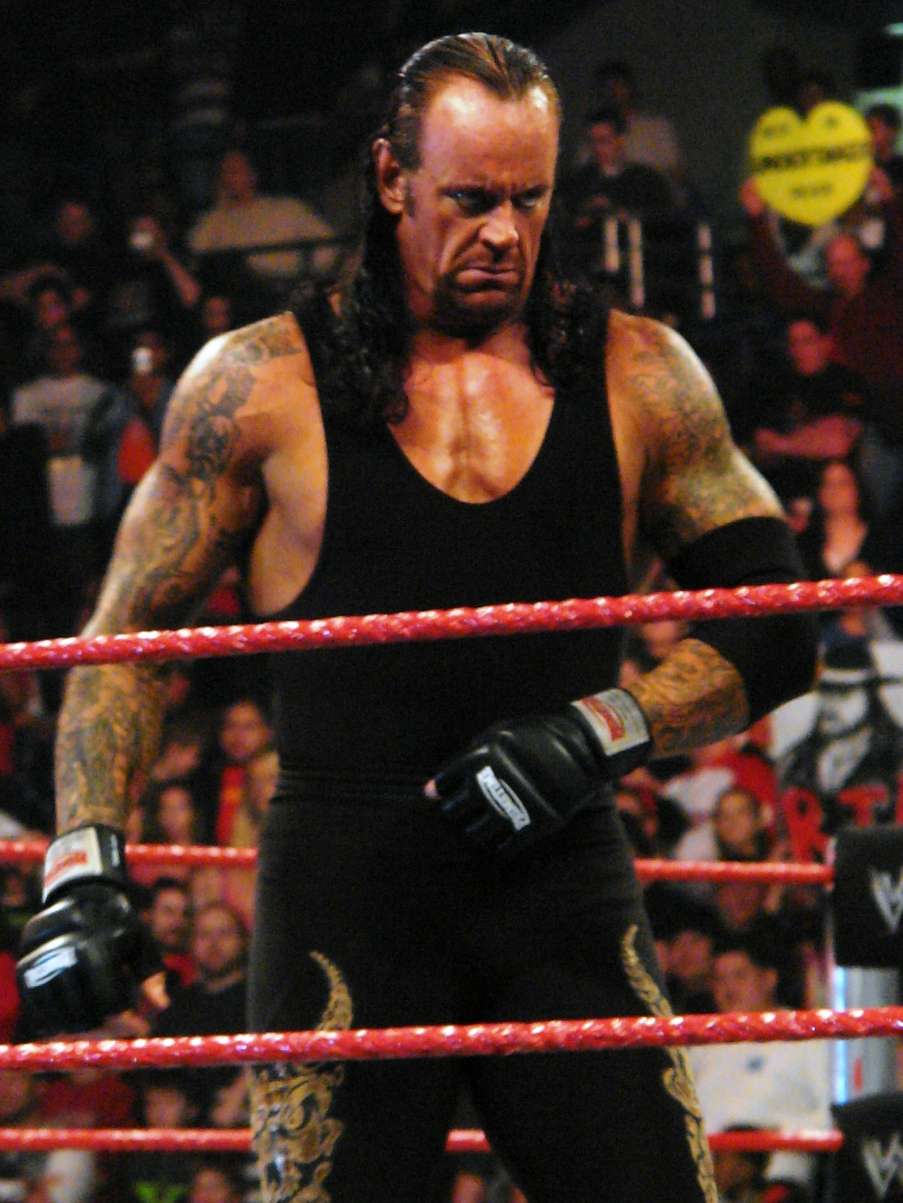
The Undertaker faced John "Bradshaw" Layfield for the WWE Championship

In the main event, John "Bradshaw" Layfield (JBL) faced The Undertaker for the WWE Championship in a Last Ride Match. At the beginning, The Undertaker performed Old School, a Chokeslam and a leg drop on the ring apron. JBL hit The Undertaker with the steel steps and tried to put The Undertaker in the hearse but The Undertaker fought back. JBL executed a diving shoulder block but The Undertaker applied a triangle choke hold on JBL, leading JBL to submit to no effect. The Undertaker backdropped out of a piledriver attempt on the steel steps and executed a Tombstone Piledriver on the steel steps, causing JBL to bleed. The Undertaker chokeslammed JBL through a broadcast table. The Undertaker carried JBL to the hearse but Heidenreich came out of the hearse and covered his mouth with a soaked rag filled with chloroform. Heidenreich placed The Undertaker into the hearse and drove off. Inside the hearse, The Undertaker jumped out and attacked Heidenreich. JBL executed a Clothesline from Hell and helped Heidenreich place The Undertaker back into the hearse. Backstage, Paul Heyman drove the hearse to the parking lot, where Heidenreich drove a car into it, causing an inexplicable explosion, meaning JBL retained the title.

== Reception ==
The Continental Airlines Arena usually can accommodate 20,000, but the capacity was reduced for the event. This event grossed over $700,000 from an approximate attendance of 10,000 – the maximum allowed. It also received 240,000 pay-per-view buys. No Mercy helped WWE earn $24.7 million in revenue from pay-per-view events versus $18.5 million the previous year, which was later confirmed by Linda McMahon, the CEO of WWE, on November 23, 2004 in a quarterly result. Canadian Online Explorer's professional wrestling section rated the event 5 out of 10. The rating was the same as the No Mercy 2005 event, which was marked as an "absolutely terrible" pay-per-view from WWE. The standard match between Billy Kidman and Paul London was rated a 7 out of 10. Additionally, the matches of Eddie Guerrero versus Luther Reigns, Spike Dudley versus Nunzio, Booker T versus John Cena, and the Last Ride match were all rated a 4 out of 10.

The event was released on DVD on November 9, 2004. The DVD was distributed by the label, Sony Music Entertainment.

== Aftermath ==
Following No Mercy, the storyline between JBL and The Undertaker ended. JBL was then placed in a new angle against Booker T. On an episode of SmackDown!, a six-man tag team match involving Booker T, Rob Van Dam, and Rey Mysterio taking on JBL, Kenzo Suzuki, and René Duprée was scheduled. At the time, Booker T being a villain, congratulated JBL with the success that he has accomplished within the company in a segment backstage. The tag team match got underway, and JBL was led to believe that Booker T was going to betray his tag partners, as Booker T warned both Van Dam and Mysterio not to interfere with him during the match. The match concluded with Booker T pinning JBL for the win, thus turning Booker T into a crowd favorite. The following week on SmackDown!, Booker T defeated Orlando Jordan, JBL's associate, to earn the right to face JBL for the WWE Championship at Survivor Series. At Survivor Series, JBL defeated Booker T to retain the WWE title.

On the October 21 episode of SmackDown!, Paul Heyman requested that Theodore Long schedule a match between Heidenreich and The Undertaker at Survivor Series. Long agreed to the match, but informed Heyman that in order for the match to take place, he had to get The Undertaker to sign the contract personally. The following week, Heyman met The Undertaker at an undisclosed location where he pleaded his case about Heidenreich wanting to face The Undertaker in a match. The Undertaker signed the contract and warned Heyman he would defeat Heidenreich at Survivor Series. At Survivor Series, The Undertaker was successful in defeating Heidenreich.

Following his win at No Mercy, John Cena lost the WWE United States Championship to Carlito Caribbean Cool, who debuted on SmackDown!. As part of the storyline, Carlito was given a bodyguard, Jesús, who stabbed Cena in the kidney while at a Boston-area nightclub. On the November 18 episode of SmackDown!, Cena captured the United States Championship after defeating Carlito for it. Cena later debuted a "custom made" spinner-style title belt in December at Armageddon in a Street Fight against Jesús.

== Results ==
No.	Results	Stipulations	Times
1^{H}	Mark Jindrak defeated Scotty 2 Hotty by pinfall	Singles match	2:46
2	Eddie Guerrero defeated Luther Reigns (with Mark Jindrak) by pinfall	Singles match	13:22
3	Spike Dudley (c) (with The Dudley Boyz) defeated Nunzio (with Johnny Stamboli) by pinfall	Singles match for the WWE Cruiserweight Championship	8:48
4	Billy Kidman defeated Paul London by pinfall	Singles match	10:37
5	René Duprée and Kenzo Suzuki (c) (with Hiroko Suzuki) defeated Rob Van Dam and Rey Mysterio by pinfall	Tag team match for the WWE Tag Team Championship	9:13
6	Big Show defeated Kurt Angle by pinfall	Singles match Luther Reigns & Mark Jindrak were banned from ringside. Had anyone interfered in the match, they would be fired	13:07
7	John Cena defeated Booker T (c) by pinfall	Singles match for the WWE United States Championship; Final match in the best of five series	10:22
8	Miss Jackie, Charlie Haas, and Rico defeated Dawn Marie and The Dudley Boyz (Bubba Ray and D-Von) by pinfall	Mixed tag team match	8:48
9	John "Bradshaw" Layfield (c) defeated The Undertaker	Last Ride match for the WWE Championship	21:06
(c) / – the champion(s) heading into the match; H / – the match was broadcast prior to the pay-per-view on Sunday Night Heat
