= No Mercy (2006) =

World Wrestling Entertainment pay-per-view event

- Promotional poster featuring King Booker and Queen Sharmell
- Promotion: World Wrestling Entertainment
- Brand: SmackDown!
- Date: October 8, 2006
- City: Raleigh, North Carolina
- Venue: RBC Center
- Attendance: 9,000
- Buy rate: 197,000

Pay-per-view chronology
← Previous; Unforgiven	Next → Cyber Sunday

No Mercy chronology
← Previous; 2005	Next → 2007

The 2006 No Mercy was a professional wrestling pay-per-view (PPV) event produced by World Wrestling Entertainment (WWE). It was the ninth No Mercy and took place on October 8, 2006, from the RBC Center in Raleigh, North Carolina, held exclusively for wrestlers from the promotion's SmackDown! brand division.

This was the last No Mercy to be brand-exclusive during the first brand split period (2002–2011), as following WrestleMania 23 in April 2007, brand-exclusive PPVs were discontinued. It would also be the last SmackDown-exclusive No Mercy until the 2016 event during the second brand split period that began that year when brand-exclusive PPVs returned.

The main event was a fatal four-way match for the World Heavyweight Championship between defending champion King Booker, Bobby Lashley, Batista, and Finlay, which Booker won after pinning Finlay. One of the predominant matches on the card was Mr. Kennedy versus The Undertaker, which Kennedy won after Undertaker was disqualified. Another primary match on the undercard was Rey Mysterio versus Chavo Guerrero in a Falls Count Anywhere match. Mysterio won the match by pinning Guerrero after a completing crossbody off a rail. Montel Vontavious Porter (MVP) also made his WWE in-ring debut at the event by beating Marty Garner.

== Production ==
=== Background ===
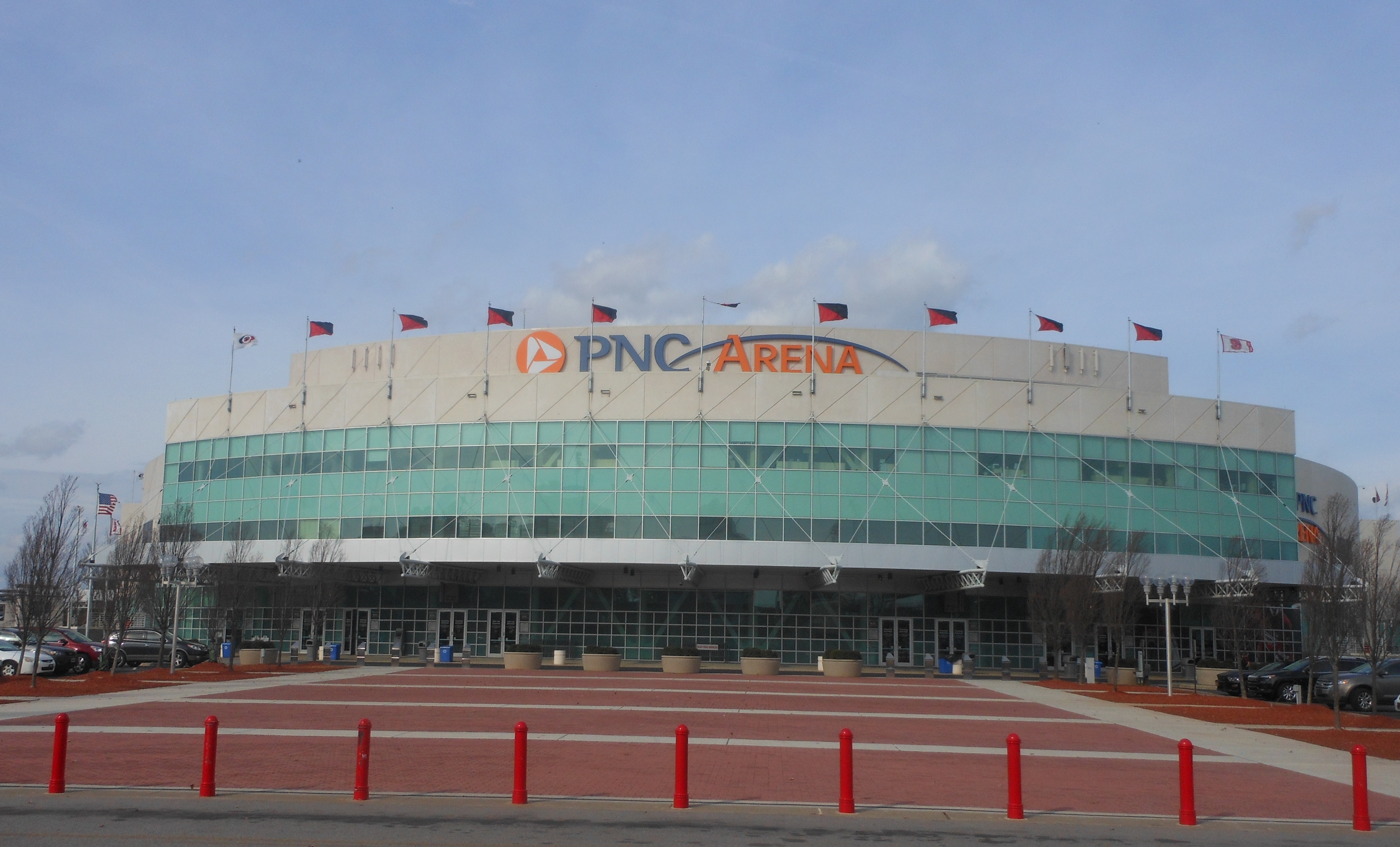
The ninth No Mercy was held at the RBC Center in Raleigh, North Carolina.

No Mercy was first held by World Wrestling Entertainment (WWE) as a United Kingdom-exclusive professional wrestling pay-per-view (PPV) event in May 1999. A second No Mercy was then held later that same year in October, but in the United States, which established No Mercy as the annual October PPV for the promotion. The ninth event was held on October 8, 2006, from the RBC Center in Raleigh, North Carolina. Like the previous three years, it featured wrestlers exclusively from the SmackDown! brand.

=== Storylines ===
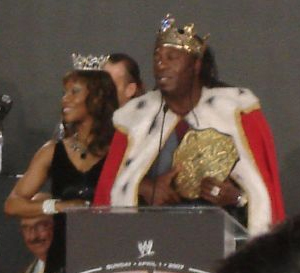
King Booker as World Heavyweight Champion.

The main feud heading into No Mercy was between World Heavyweight Champion King Booker, Bobby Lashley, Batista, and Finlay. At SummerSlam, the pay-per-view two months before No Mercy, Batista defeated King Booker by disqualification after Queen Sharmell interfered, meaning King Booker retained the World Heavyweight Championship. The next week on SmackDown!, Batista and Lashley faced King Booker's Court (King Booker, Finlay, and William Regal) in a three-on-two handicap match. King Booker's Court controlled most of the match, isolating Batista and Lashley from each other. Towards the end of the match, Lashley tagged in Batista, who pinned King Booker for the win after a spinebuster. Two weeks later, on the September 8 edition of SmackDown!, Batista faced King Booker for the World Heavyweight Championship, which King Booker won after Finlay interfered and hit Batista with a shillelagh. After the match, Finlay continued to attack Batista with the shillelagh and a steel chair. The next week on SmackDown!, Finlay began degrading Batista, saying he is probably hiding in a hole licking his wounds. As Finlay was about to continue, Lashley came out and said that only someone like him would jump Batista from behind. SmackDown! General Manager Theodore Long then scheduled Finlay to wrestle Lashley later that night to determine the number one contender to the World Heavyweight Championship at No Mercy. Lashley defeated Finlay and became number one contender after Finlay was disqualified for hitting him with a shillelagh. On the September 22 episode of SmackDown!, Lashley teamed up with Batista to take on Finlay and Regal. Midway through the match, Batista and Finlay brawled outside the ring and into the crowd, leaving Regal on his own against Lashley. Lashley gained the pinfall after hitting Regal with a Spear. Later that night, Batista was scheduled to wrestle Finlay at No Mercy. Two weeks later on the October 6 episode of SmackDown!, King Booker faced off against Finlay and Batista faced off against Lashley, with both matches ending in a no-contest. This resulted in Theodore Long adding Finlay and Batista into the match, thus making it a Fatal Four-Way match between the four for the title at No Mercy.

The other main match on the card was Mr. Kennedy versus The Undertaker. On the September 8 episode of SmackDown!, Kennedy informed General Manager Theodore Long that if John Cena came to SmackDown!, he wanted a spot on Raw; Kennedy proclaimed that he had lost his interest in SmackDown! as he had already defeated every top performer on the roster. Long subsequently booked Kennedy for No Mercy against an opponent he had never faced, who turned out to be The Undertaker. On the September 29 edition of SmackDown!, Kennedy presented a tribute to the Undertaker and tried to get out of the match. However, the Undertaker made his presence known to Kennedy, as he informed him, "I show no mercy, and you will rest in peace". Kennedy attempted to strike the Undertaker with his microphone, which suddenly blew up in Kennedy's hand.

The most personal feud was between Rey Mysterio and Chavo Guerrero. This feud started when Guerrero cost Mysterio the World Heavyweight Championship against King Booker at The Great American Bash, claiming that he was "a leech living off the blood of the Guerrero name." Guerrero and Mysterio feuded for weeks, including a match at SummerSlam, where Vickie Guerrero accidentally cost Mysterio the match by knocking him off the top rope. The next week on SmackDown!, Vickie turned on Mysterio and sided with Guerrero, becoming his new "business manager".

== Event ==
Other on-screen personnel
Role:	Name:
English commentators	Michael Cole
English commentators	John Bradshaw Layfield
Spanish commentators	Hugo Savinovich
Spanish commentators	Carlos Cabrera
Ring announcer	Tony Chimel
Referees	Charles Robinson
Referees	Nick Patrick
Referees	Jim Korderas
Referees	John Cone

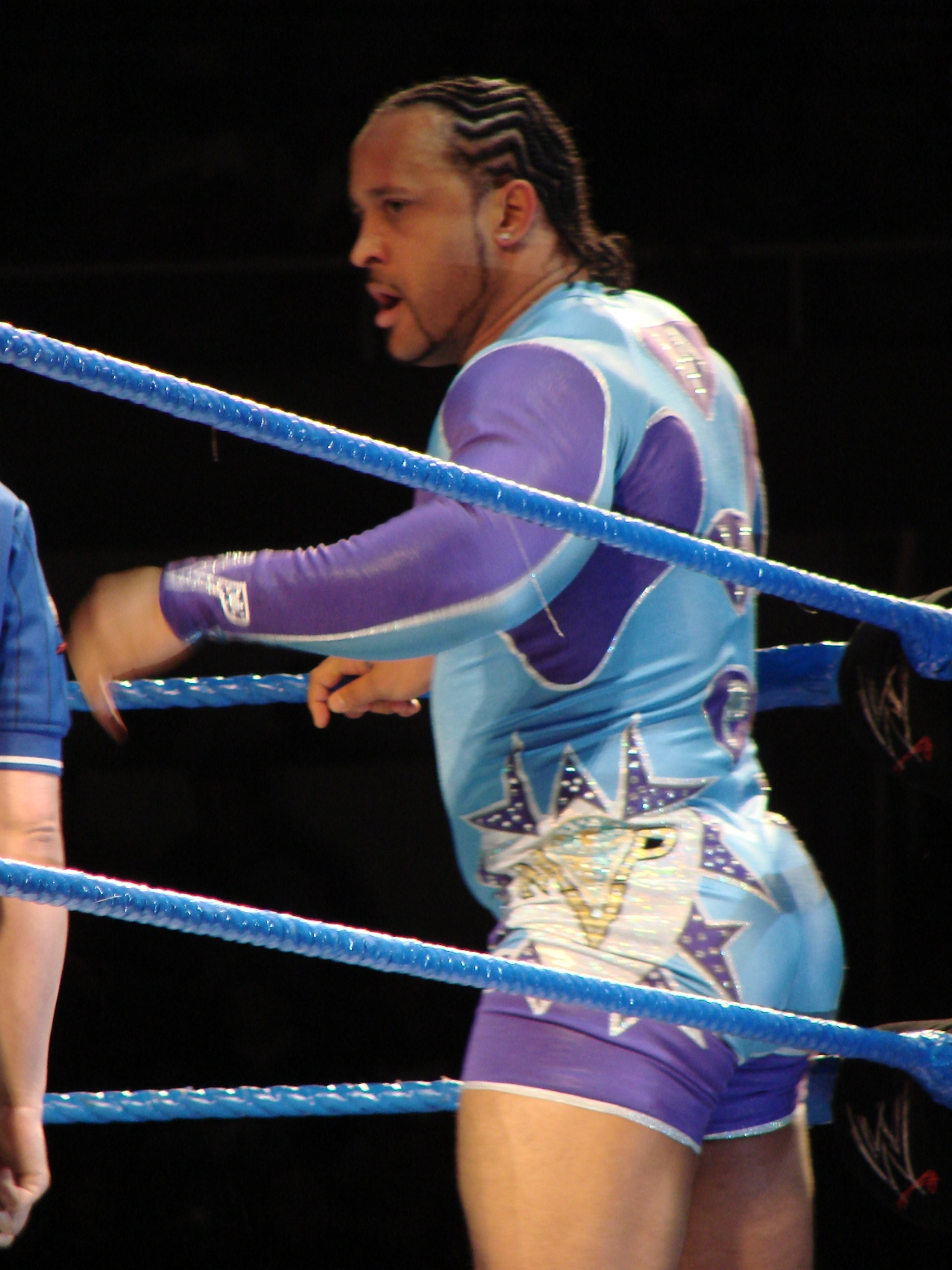
MVP, who debuted at No Mercy.

Before the event went live on pay-per-view, Jimmy Wang Yang defeated Sylvan in a dark match. The first match that aired was the non-title match between the Cruiserweight Champion Gregory Helms and Matt Hardy. After a back and forth match, Helms took control until Hardy was able to counter a Shining wizard with a Twist of Fate for the win.

Next was the WWE Tag Team Championship match between the champions Paul London and Brian Kendrick, with Ashley, and K.C. James and Idol Stevens, with Michelle McCool. London was pushed off the second turnbuckle to the outside early on, leading to the challengers dominating, before London tagged in Kendrick. Kendrick pinned James after a Sliced Bread #2 followed by London running to jump off Kendrick's back to perform a shooting star press to win the match for his team. The next match was Montel Vontavious Porter's (MVP) official debut. He wrestled Marty Garner in a squash match, and won by pinning him after a playmaker.

In the fourth match, The Undertaker faced United States Champion Mr. Kennedy in a non-title match. Kennedy took control, throwing the Undertaker into an exposed turnbuckle and executing a piledriver on Undertaker. Kennedy retrieved the United States title belt but Undertaker retrieved the belt and hit Kennedy with it, causing a disqualification. The Undertaker then performed Tombstone Piledrivers on both Kennedy and the referee, Charles Robinson.

The fifth match was the Falls Count Anywhere match between Rey Mysterio and Chavo Guerrero with Vickie Guerrero. Mysterio and Guerrero fought outside of the ring and through the crowd, before Mysterio managed to pin Guerrero after a 619 and Crossbody off a guardrail. The sixth match was the encounter between William Regal and his opponent, who was revealed to be Chris Benoit. Benoit, who was returning after a five-month sabbatical, cut Regal open halfway through the match after a headbutt. Benoit won by submission when Regal tapped out to the Crippler Crossface.

In the main event, King Booker faced Batista, Finlay and Bobby Lashley in a fatal four-way match for the World Heavyweight Championship. An early team up saw King Booker and Finlay take control early on, until Finlay attacked King Booker and gained the advantage. The Little Bastard also interfered on Finlay's behalf. Lashley then dominated, before King Booker took him out. At the end of the match, Batista took control, executing a spinebuster on every competitor and a Batista Bomb on Finlay. Lashley then performed a spear on Batista before he could capitalize. As everyone was down, King Booker then crawled over on top of Finlay and pinned Finlay to retain the title.

=== Controversy ===
During the event, William Regal was involved in a series of backstage skits that involved Vito, and Regal's disgust in Vito wearing a dress, due to having a dress-wearing gimmick. After getting out of the shower and having another argument with Vito, Regal ran off with his towel falling off, exposing his buttocks and, for a brief second, his penis. Although his buttocks being exposed was scripted, his penis was completely accidental. WWE issued an apology for the incident the next day.

== Aftermath ==
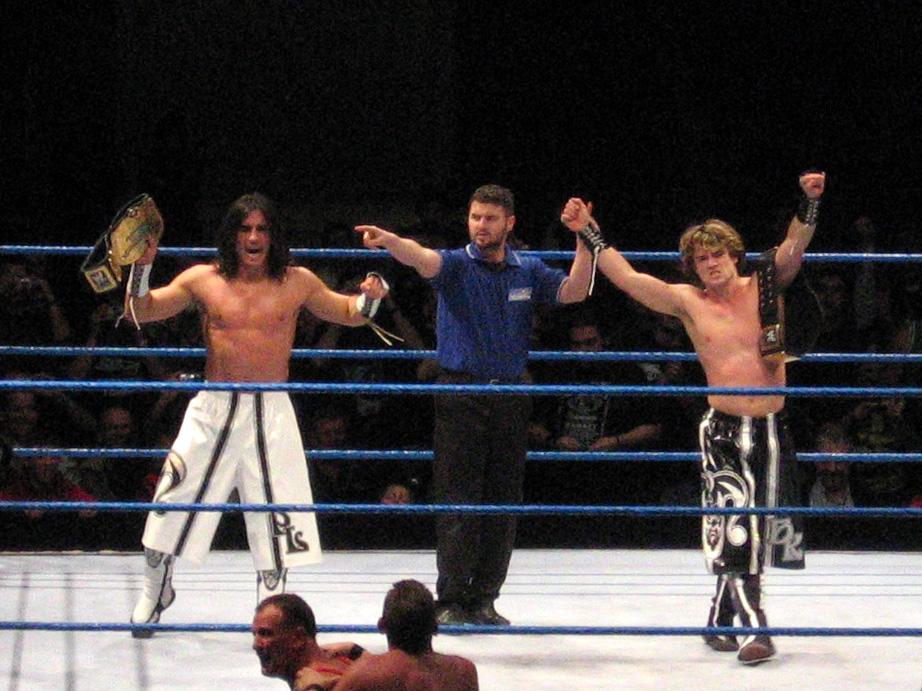
Paul London and Brian Kendrick, who feuded with Dave Taylor and William Regal after No Mercy.

At Cyber Sunday, King Booker successfully defended the World Heavyweight Championship in the "Champion Of Champions" match, where he defeated both the ECW World Champion, Big Show and the WWE Champion, John Cena. King Booker kept the title until Survivor Series, where he dropped it to Batista.

Mr. Kennedy and The Undertaker continued to feud, including a First Blood match at Survivor Series, which Kennedy won after MVP hit the Undertaker with a steel chair, and a Last Ride match at Armageddon, which the Undertaker won. Kennedy also lost his United States Championship to Chris Benoit. MVP then began a feud with the Undertaker's on-screen half-brother Kane.

Chavo Guerrero challenged Rey Mysterio to an "I Quit" match, which he won, after assaulting Mysterio's knee, kayfabe injuring it. Mysterio took time off from wrestling, and Guerrero began feuding with Benoit after Benoit confronted him over his treatment of Mysterio. Benoit retained his United States Championship against Guerrero at Survivor Series.

Matt Hardy reformed the Hardys tag team with his brother Jeff, and began a feud with MNM, (Johnny Nitro and Joey Mercury), which included a ladder match at Armageddon, in which Paul London and Brian Kendrick were also involved. London and Kendrick had been feuding with Dave Taylor and William Regal up to Armageddon. Gregory Helms, meanwhile, feuded with Jimmy Wang Yang over his Cruiserweight title.

This 2006 event would be the final No Mercy to be brand-exclusive during the first brand-extension, as following WrestleMania 23 in April 2007, brand-exclusive PPVs were discontinued. It would also be the final No Mercy to be SmackDown-exclusive until the 2016 event during the second brand extension when brand exclusive PPVs were reintroduced.

== Results ==
No.	Results	Stipulations	Times
1^{D}	Jimmy Wang Yang defeated Sylvan	Singles match	—
2	Matt Hardy defeated Gregory Helms	Singles match	13:07
3	Brian Kendrick and Paul London (c) (with Ashley) defeated K.C. James and Idol Stevens (with Michelle McCool)	Tag team match for the WWE Tag Team Championship	9:35
4	Montel Vontavious Porter defeated Marty Garner	Singles match	2:28
5	Mr. Kennedy defeated The Undertaker by disqualification	Singles match	20:34
6	Rey Mysterio defeated Chavo Guerrero (with Vickie Guerrero)	Falls Count Anywhere match	12:10
7	Chris Benoit defeated William Regal by submission	Singles match	11:16
8	King Booker (c) (with Queen Sharmell) defeated Bobby Lashley, Batista, and Finlay	Fatal 4-Way match for the World Heavyweight Championship	16:52
(c) / – the champion(s) heading into the match; D / – this was a dark match
