= No Mercy (2008) =

World Wrestling Entertainment pay-per-view event

- Promotional poster featuring Jeff Hardy
- Promotion: World Wrestling Entertainment
- Brand(s): Raw; SmackDown; ECW
- Date: October 5, 2008
- City: Portland, Oregon
- Venue: Rose Garden
- Attendance: 9,527
- Buy rate: 261,000

Pay-per-view chronology
← Previous; Unforgiven	Next → Cyber Sunday

No Mercy chronology
← Previous; 2007	Next → 2016

The 2008 No Mercy was a professional wrestling pay-per-view (PPV) event produced by World Wrestling Entertainment (WWE). It was the 11th No Mercy and took place on October 5, 2008, at the Rose Garden in Portland, Oregon, held for wrestlers from the promotion's Raw, SmackDown, and ECW brand divisions. It is one of only two WWE PPV events to be held in the U.S. state of Oregon, the other being Unforgiven in 2004. No Mercy was replaced by Hell in a Cell in 2009; however, after eight years, No Mercy was reinstated in 2016.

Eight professional wrestling matches were scheduled on the event's card, which featured a supercard, a scheduling of more than one main event. The first featured wrestlers from the Raw brand, in which defending World Heavyweight Champion Chris Jericho defeated Shawn Michaels in a ladder match. The other main event featured wrestlers from the SmackDown brand, in which defending WWE Champion Triple H defeated challenger Jeff Hardy in a standard wrestling match. Three featured bouts were scheduled on the undercard. In a standard wrestling match between wrestlers from the Raw brand, Batista defeated John "Bradshaw" Layfield (JBL) to become the number one contender for the World Heavyweight Championship. The second was a standard match between wrestlers from the SmackDown brand in which the Big Show defeated The Undertaker. The third was the predominant match from the ECW brand, a standard match for the ECW Championship, in which the champion Matt Hardy defeated Mark Henry.

The event had an approximate attendance of 10,000. When the event was released on DVD, it reached a peak position of second on Billboard's Recreational Sports DVD Sales Chart. The event received 261,000 pay-per-view buys, less than the previous year's event. It was also the first No Mercy PPV broadcast in high definition.

== Production ==
=== Background ===
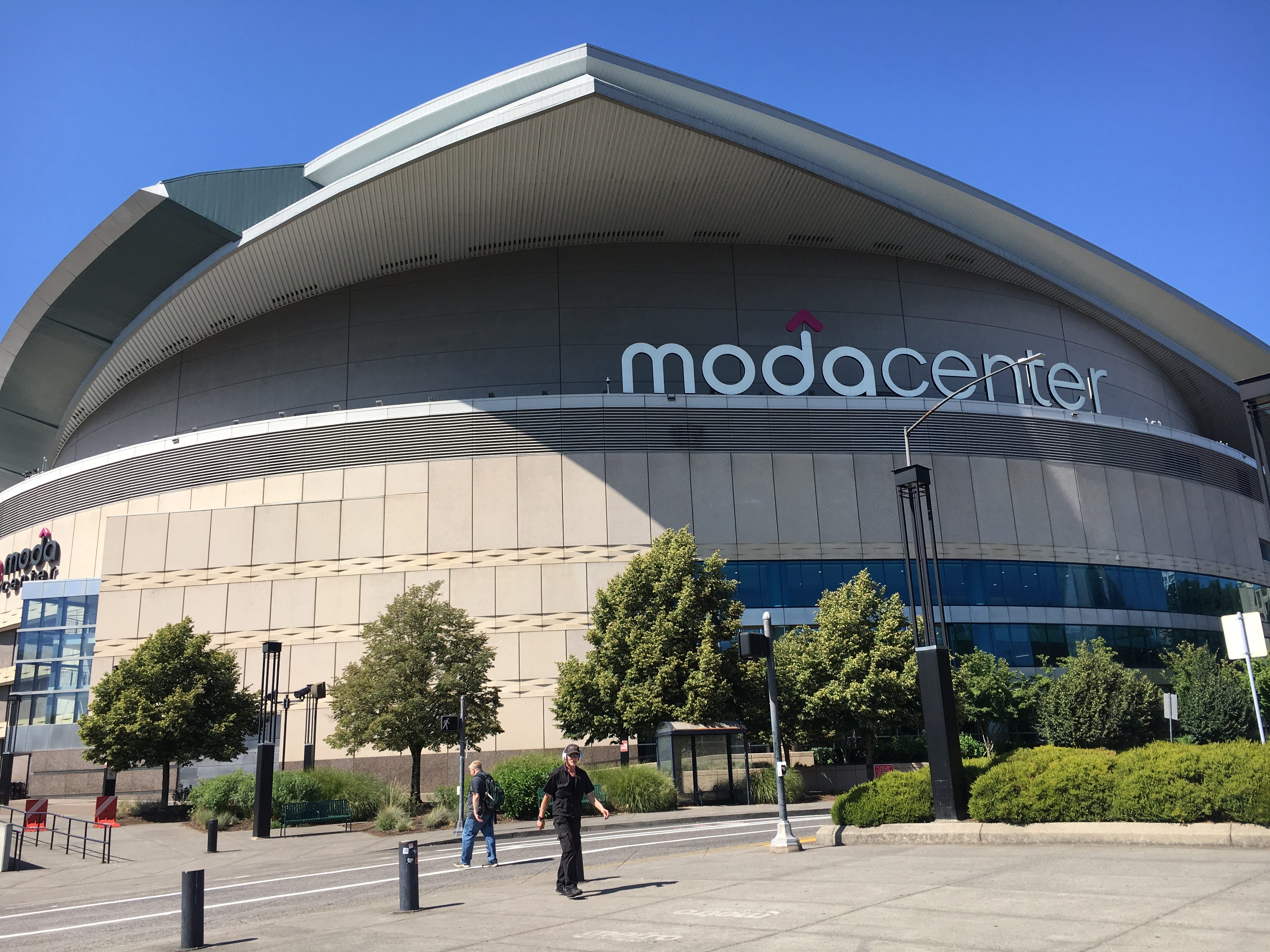
The 11th No Mercy was held at the Rose Garden in Portland, Oregon.

No Mercy was first held by World Wrestling Entertainment (WWE) as a United Kingdom-exclusive professional wrestling pay-per-view (PPV) event in May 1999. A second No Mercy was then held later that same year in October, but in the United States, which established No Mercy as the annual October PPV for the promotion. The 11th event was held on October 5, 2008, at the Rose Garden in Portland, Oregon and featured wrestlers from the Raw, SmackDown, and ECW brands.

=== Storylines ===
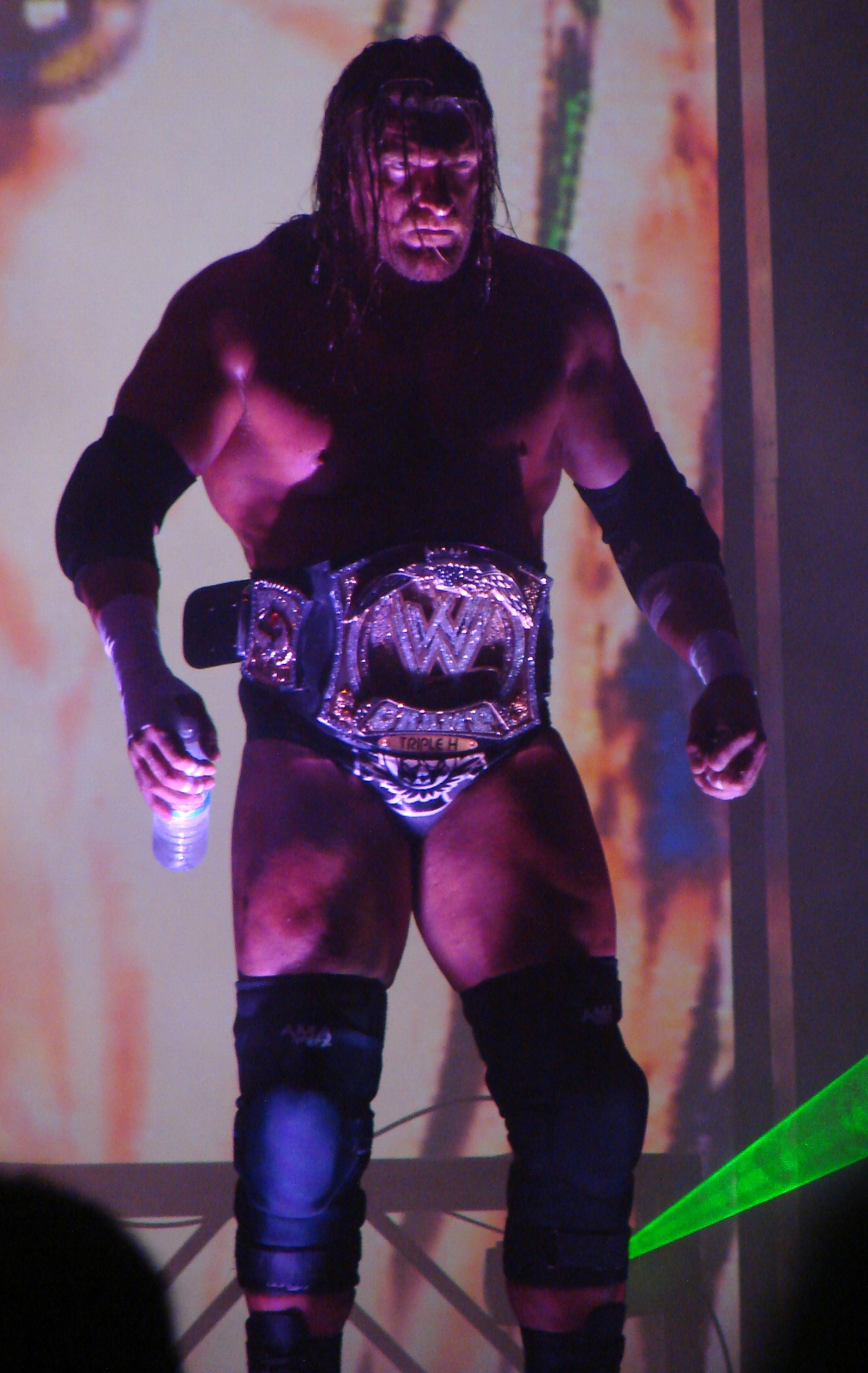
Triple H as SmackDown's WWE Champion.

The event featured eight professional wrestling matches with outcomes predetermined by WWE script writers. The matches featured wrestlers portraying their characters in planned storylines that took place before, during and after the event. All wrestlers were from one of WWE's three brands – Raw, SmackDown, and ECW – the three storyline divisions in which WWE assigned its employees.

Wrestlers from Raw were featured in the main event at No Mercy: a ladder match for the World Heavyweight Championship, in which the title belt was suspended above the ring and the first man to climb the ladder and retrieve the belt would win. The match was contested between World Heavyweight Champion Chris Jericho and Shawn Michaels. At Unforgiven, Jericho replaced then World Heavyweight Champion CM Punk in a Championship Scramble match, a 20-minute time limit bout, during which participants can become the temporary champion via pinfall or submission. Punk had, earlier in the night, been attacked by Randy Orton, and could not compete, leading to Jericho being his replacement and winning the World Heavyweight Championship. On the September 15 episode of Raw, it was announced that Michaels would wrestle Jericho for the World Heavyweight Championship at No Mercy in a ladder match.

The leading rivalry on SmackDown was between Triple H and Jeff Hardy over the WWE Championship. It was announced on the September 12 episode of SmackDown that there would be a fatal four-way match, a standard wrestling match involving four competitors. The winner of the match would challenge Triple H for the WWE Championship at No Mercy. The Brian Kendrick, Shelton Benjamin, Montel Vontavious Porter (MVP), and Jeff Hardy were the four participants in the match, which Hardy won.

It was also announced that Batista would face John "Bradshaw" Layfield (JBL) to determine the number one contender for the World Heavyweight Championship.

During the September 17 episode of ECW, it was announced that Matt Hardy would defend the ECW Championship against Mark Henry.

It was announced on the September 22 episode of Raw that Kane would receive a singles match against Rey Mysterio. On the following week on an episode of Raw, an extra stipulation was added, in which if Kane won at No Mercy, Mysterio would be forced to unmask after the match.

It was also announced that Big Show and The Undertaker would have a match, following the events that occurred at Unforgiven.

== Event ==
Other on-screen personnel
Role:	Name:
English commentators	Michael Cole (Raw)
English commentators	Jerry Lawler (Raw/ECW)
English commentators	Jim Ross (SmackDown)
English commentators	Tazz (SmackDown)
English commentators	Todd Grisham (ECW)
Spanish commentators	Carlos Cabrera
Spanish commentators	Hugo Savinovich
Backstage interviewers	Eve Torres
Ring announcers	Lilian Garcia (Raw)
Ring announcers	Justin Roberts (SmackDown)
Ring announcers	Tony Chimel (ECW)
Referees	Charles Robinson
Referees	John Cone
Referees	Mike Chioda
Referees	Scott Armstrong
Referees	Mike Posey
Referees	Aaron Mahoney
Referees	Chad Patton

=== Dark match ===
Prior to the pay-per-view, The Colóns (Carlito and Primo) defeated John Morrison and The Miz in a dark match.

=== Main card ===
The first televised match was for the ECW Championship, featuring the champion Matt Hardy versus Mark Henry, who was accompanied by his manager Tony Atlas. During the start of the match, Henry overpowered Matt Hardy with attacks. Hardy tried to lock in a Figure-four leglock, only to be pushed face first onto the second turnbuckle by Henry. Henry then gained control over Hardy. During the match, Henry was able to lock in the bearhug, but Hardy countered into a sunset flip. Hardy was able to execute the Side Effect and went for the Twist of Fate, only to be dropped chest first onto the mat. The end of the match involved Henry going for the World's Strongest Slam, only to have Hardy counter it with another Twist of Fate for the win.

After that, Beth Phoenix faced Candice Michelle for the WWE Women's Championship. At one point, Santino Marella pulled Phoenix out of the ring while Candice went for the pin. However, the distraction allowed Phoenix to get the advantage over Candice. The end of the match involved Candice going for the Candywrapper, only to have Phoenix counter it into a Glam Slam to pin Candice for the win.

Next, Rey Mysterio wrestled Kane with the stipulation that if Mysterio lost he would have to unmask. During the start of the match Mysterio went for a running attack only to be big booted by Kane. Kane tried to rip Mysterio's mask off only for Mysterio to roll out of the ring. A spot in the match was Mysterio going for a diving hurricanrana only to be caught by Kane who went for a powerbomb, only to be headscissored over the top rope. The end of the match was Mysterio looking to dive to the outside onto Kane, but Kane attacking him with a chair shot in mid-air caused a disqualification. Mysterio's victory allowed him to keep his mask.

The fourth match was a #1 contender's match between Batista and John "Bradshaw" Layfield (JBL). Batista performed a powerslam before attempting a spear, but JBL blocked with a big boot. On a second try moments later, Batista executed the spinebuster and ended it with the Batista Bomb to win.

The first one of three upper card matches was a singles match between The Undertaker and Big Show. Big Show was able to remove a turnbuckle pad, then slammed The Undertaker's head into it. Big Show then executed a punch to the face on The Undertaker, followed by one to the back of the head that knocked The Undertaker out and forced the referee to stop the match, making Big Show the winner by knockout.

Next, Triple H defended the WWE Championship against Jeff Hardy. Hardy tried on several attempts to executing the Twist of Fate, and eventually performed it after countering a Pedigree. Hardy then went up top and executed the Swanton Bomb and slowly crawled and laid on top of Triple H. At the two count, Triple H rolled him over into a crucifix pin and got the win.

=== Main event match ===
The main event match was a ladder match for the World Heavyweight Championship between defending champion Chris Jericho and Shawn Michaels. Michaels looked to land an early Sweet Chin Music, but Jericho brought the fight to the floor and slammed Michaels' taped left arm and shoulder into the ring post, before locking in the Walls of Jericho. Jericho was then able to bring the ladder into play and used it to whip Michaels. He grabbed a second smaller ladder and propped it in the corner, but Michaels ultimately sent Jericho into the ladder. Later, Jericho performed a Lionsault onto a ladder that was on top of Michaels. At one point, Lance Cade ran out to stop Michaels from climbing the ladder. Michaels and Jericho climbed the ladder and both of them grabbed a side of the belt, tugging back and forth. Jericho performed a headbutt that threw Michaels to the floor. Jericho retrieved the belt, thus retaining his title.

== Reception ==
The event was generally well received by critics. Dave Meltzer of the Wrestling Observer Newsletter awarded, out of five stars, four stars to the Triple H-Jeff Hardy match, and four and a half stars to the Jericho-Michaels main event. The latter received the award for Match of the Year.

When the event was released on DVD, it reached a peak position of second on Billboard's Recreational Sports DVD Sales Chart.

== Aftermath ==
=== Raw ===
Batista faced Chris Jericho for the World Heavyweight Championship at Cyber Sunday with the fans voting for Stone Cold Steve Austin as the special guest referee in the match. Eight days later at the 800th episode of Raw, Jericho regained the title after defeating Batista in a Steel Cage match.

=== SmackDown ===
The feud between Triple H and Jeff Hardy continued to Cyber Sunday. After a fan vote made Hardy the number one contender, Triple H retained the WWE Championship against him at Cyber Sunday. Hardy remained in the title picture, and eventually won the championship at Armageddon.

The Undertaker and Big Show feud continued to Cyber Sunday and Survivor Series. At Cyber Sunday, The Undertaker defeated Big Show in a Last Man Standing match; the stipulation had been chosen by the fans. At Survivor Series, The Undertaker defeated Big Show in a casket match.

=== Future ===
In 2009, No Mercy was replaced by Hell in a Cell as the annual October PPV; however, after eight years, No Mercy was reinstated in 2016 as a SmackDown-exclusive PPV and it and that year's Hell in a Cell, which was Raw-exclusive, were both held in October that year. During this time in April 2011, the promotion ceased using its full name with "WWE" becoming an orphaned initialism.

== Results ==
No.	Results	Stipulations	Times
1^{D}	The Colóns (Carlito and Primo) defeated John Morrison and The Miz	Tag team match	06:45
2	Matt Hardy (c) defeated Mark Henry (with Tony Atlas) by pinfall	Singles match for the ECW Championship	08:08
3	Beth Phoenix (c) (with Santino Marella) defeated Candice Michelle by pinfall	Singles match for the WWE Women's Championship	04:40
4	Rey Mysterio defeated Kane by disqualification	Singles match Had Mysterio lost, he would have had to unmask.	10:10
5	Batista defeated John "Bradshaw" Layfield by pinfall	Singles match to determine the #1 contender to the World Heavyweight Championship	05:18
6	Big Show defeated The Undertaker by technical knockout	Singles match	10:04
7	Triple H (c) defeated Jeff Hardy by pinfall	Singles match for the WWE Championship	18:00
8	Chris Jericho (c) defeated Shawn Michaels	Ladder match for the World Heavyweight Championship	22:20
(c) / – the champion(s) heading into the match; D / – this was a dark match
