= WWE No Mercy =

WWE pay-per-view and livestreaming event series

- NXT No Mercy 2023–2024 logo
- Promotion: WWE
- Brands: Raw (2002, 2007–2008, 2017); SmackDown (2002–2008, 2016); ECW (2007–2008); NXT (2023–2025)
- Other names: NXT No Mercy (2023–2025)
- First event: 1999 (UK)
- Last event: 2025

WWE No Mercy, also known as NXT No Mercy from 2023 to 2025, was a professional wrestling event produced by WWE, a professional wrestling promotion based in Connecticut. The first No Mercy was held on May 16, 1999, in Manchester, England, and was the only No Mercy event produced in the United Kingdom. A second No Mercy was then held in October that year in Cleveland, Ohio, United States. Beginning with this second event, No Mercy became the annual October pay-per-view (PPV) until 2008. The event was then discontinued and replaced by Hell in a Cell in 2009. After eight years, No Mercy was reinstated in October 2016. However, No Mercy was again discontinued after the September 2017 event, as WWE reduced the amount of yearly PPVs held after they had ended the production of brand-exclusive PPVs following WrestleMania 34 in 2018. In 2023, WWE again revived the event, this time for its developmental brand, NXT, in September, which was held annually until 2025.

The first four events were held when the promotion was still called the World Wrestling Federation (WWF). In May 2002, the promotion was renamed to World Wrestling Entertainment (WWE), and in 2011, the "WWE" name became an orphaned initialism for the promotion. During the first brand extension, No Mercy was held exclusively for the SmackDown brand from 2003 to 2006. When the event was reinstated for the second brand extension in 2016, it was again SmackDown-exclusive and was then Raw-exclusive in 2017. It then became exclusive for NXT in 2023. In addition to traditional PPV, the 2016 and 2017 events were livestreamed on the WWE Network, and then just Peacock and the WWE Network beginning in 2023.

== History ==
No Mercy logo used in the 2016 and 2017 events

On May 16, 1999, the then-World Wrestling Federation (WWF) held a pay-per-view (PPV) in the United Kingdom, specifically Manchester, England, titled No Mercy. The pay-per-view market was relatively new to Britain at the time: before One Night Only in 1997, all pay-per-view events were broadcast for free on Sky Sports. The UK-exclusive pay-per-views were established to serve as promotion for the new delivery method, however, were booked and treated similar to house shows. This first event would be the only No Mercy event produced in the United Kingdom, as the WWF held a second No Mercy later that same year on October 17, but in Cleveland, Ohio, United States. No Mercy continued as the annual October PPV for the promotion (with the May UK PPV renamed Insurrextion, held until 2003) until 2008. The event was then discontinued and replaced by Hell in a Cell in 2009, which became the annual October PPV.

In March 2002, the WWF introduced the brand extension, where the promotion divided its main roster into two brands, Raw and SmackDown!, where the wrestlers were exclusively assigned to perform—in May 2002, the WWF was renamed to World Wrestling Entertainment (WWE). The 2002 event, which was the first to be held under the WWE name, featured wrestlers from both the Raw and SmackDown! brands, but from 2003 to 2006, the PPV was produced exclusively for wrestlers from the SmackDown! brand. Following WrestleMania 23 in 2007, WWE discontinued brand-exclusive PPVs, thus the 2007 and 2008 events featured wrestlers from the Raw, SmackDown, and ECW brands—ECW was established as a third brand in 2006.

In February 2010, the ECW brand was disbanded. In April 2011, the promotion ceased using its full name, with the "WWE" name becoming an orphaned initialism for the promotion, and in August that year, the first brand extension ended. In July 2016, WWE reintroduced the brand extension, again dividing the roster between the Raw and SmackDown brands. No Mercy was reinstated that year for October and was again produced exclusively for SmackDown but was also the first No Mercy event to be livestreamed on the WWE Network. The following year, it was moved up to September and produced exclusively for Raw. This 2017 event would be the final No Mercy event held, as following WrestleMania 34 in 2018, WWE again discontinued brand-exclusive PPVs, resulting in WWE reducing the amount of yearly PPVs produced.

During a conference call held by Shawn Michaels, the Senior Vice President of Talent Development Creative, on July 27, 2023, WWE announced the return of No Mercy for wrestlers of the company's developmental brand, NXT. It was the first to be livestreamed on Peacock in the United States, where the WWE Network service merged in 2021. Unlike previous No Mercy events, it did not air on PPV as NXT's events ceased airing on traditional PPV beginning in 2022.

== Theme song ==
Jim Johnston, who was a long-time music composer for the promotion, wrote a song titled "No Mercy", which was used as a regular theme song for the events in 2002, 2004 and 2006, while a remix version in collaboration with Eric & The Hostiles was used in 2007. For the 2016 and 2017 events, the theme song was by KIT and was also titled "No Mercy". Other theme songs were "Used Up" by composer Max Power, "A.D.D." by Vanilla Ice featuring Casey Chaos and "Oh Hell Yeah" by H-Blockx in 1999, "RamRod" by composers Daniel Holter and Mike Standal in 2000, "Click Click Boom" by Saliva in 2001, "Today is the Day" by Dope and "Last Man Out" by Victor Reid both in 2003, "Save Me" by Shinedown in 2005 and "All Nightmare Long" by Metallica in 2008.

== Events ==
Raw-branded event	SmackDown-branded event	NXT-branded event

#	Event	Date	City	Venue	Main event	Ref.
1	No Mercy (UK)	May 16, 1999	Manchester, England	Manchester Evening News Arena	Stone Cold Steve Austin (c) vs. The Undertaker vs. Triple H in an Anything Goes Triple Threat match for the WWF Championship	
2	No Mercy (1999)	October 17, 1999	Cleveland, Ohio	Gund Arena	Triple H (c) vs. Stone Cold Steve Austin in an Anything Goes match for the WWF Championship	
3	No Mercy (2000)	October 22, 2000	Albany, New York	Pepsi Arena	The Rock (c) vs. Kurt Angle in a No Disqualification match for the WWF Championship	
4	No Mercy (2001)	October 21, 2001	St. Louis, Missouri	Savvis Center	Stone Cold Steve Austin (c) vs. Kurt Angle vs. Rob Van Dam in a Triple Threat match for the WWF Championship	
5	No Mercy (2002)	October 20, 2002	North Little Rock, Arkansas	Alltel Arena	Brock Lesnar (c) vs. The Undertaker in a Hell in a Cell match for the WWE Championship	
6	No Mercy (2003)	October 19, 2003	Baltimore, Maryland	1st Mariner Arena	Brock Lesnar (c) vs. The Undertaker in a Biker Chain match for the WWE Championship	
7	No Mercy (2004)	October 3, 2004	East Rutherford, New Jersey	Continental Airlines Arena	John "Bradshaw" Layfield (c) vs. The Undertaker in a Last Ride match for the WWE Championship	
8	No Mercy (2005)	October 9, 2005	Houston, Texas	Toyota Center	Batista (c) vs. Eddie Guerrero for the World Heavyweight Championship	
9	No Mercy (2006)	October 8, 2006	Raleigh, North Carolina	RBC Center	King Booker (c) vs. Bobby Lashley vs. Batista vs. Finlay in a Fatal four-way match for the World Heavyweight Championship	
10	No Mercy (2007)	October 7, 2007	Rosemont, Illinois	Allstate Arena	Randy Orton (c) vs. Triple H for the WWE Championship; Triple H vs Umaga for the WWE Championship; Triple H (c) vs. Randy Orton in a Last Man Standing match for the WWE Championship	
11	No Mercy (2008)	October 5, 2008	Portland, Oregon	Rose Garden	Chris Jericho (c) vs. Shawn Michaels in a Ladder match for the World Heavyweight Championship	
12	No Mercy (2016)	October 9, 2016	Sacramento, California	Golden 1 Center	Bray Wyatt vs. Randy Orton (Note: The advertised main event was AJ Styles (c) vs. Dean Ambrose vs. John Cena in a triple threat match for the WWE World Championship, but on the day of the event, the order of the match card changed due to the second United States presidential debate. The triple threat match opened the PPV so that it would not air at the same time as the debate. As a result, Randy Orton vs. Bray Wyatt became the final match on the card.)	
13	No Mercy (2017)	September 24, 2017	Los Angeles, California	Staples Center	Brock Lesnar (c) vs. Braun Strowman for the WWE Universal Championship	
14	NXT No Mercy (2023)	September 30, 2023	Bakersfield, California	Mechanics Bank Arena	Becky Lynch (c) vs. Tiffany Stratton in an Extreme Rules match for the NXT Women's Championship	
15	NXT No Mercy (2024)	September 1, 2024	Denver, Colorado	Ball Arena	Ethan Page (c) vs. Joe Hendry for the NXT Championship	
16	NXT No Mercy (2025)	September 27, 2025	Fort Lauderdale, Florida	FTL War Memorial	Oba Femi (c) vs. Ricky Saints for the NXT Championship	
(c) – refers to the champion(s) heading into the match
