= No Mercy (UK) =

1999 World Wrestling Federation pay-per-view event

- Promotional poster featuring "Stone Cold" Steve Austin, Kane, Triple H, The Undertaker, and Billy Gunn
- Promotion: World Wrestling Federation
- Date: May 16, 1999
- City: Manchester, England
- Venue: Manchester Evening News Arena
- Attendance: 18,107

Pay-per-view chronology
← Previous; Backlash	Next → Over the Edge

No Mercy chronology
← Previous; First	Next → 1999 (US)

WWE in Europe chronology
← Previous; Capital Carnage	Next → Rebellion

The 1999 No Mercy held in the United Kingdom, also known as No Mercy UK, was a professional wrestling pay-per-view (PPV) event produced by the American promotion World Wrestling Federation (WWF, renamed WWE in 2002). It was the inaugural No Mercy and was the company's third PPV event to air exclusively in the United Kingdom. The event took place on May 16, 1999, at the Manchester Evening News Arena in Manchester, England. This was the only No Mercy held in the United Kingdom, as beginning with the October 1999 event, all further No Mercy events were held in the United States.

The card compromised eight matches. In the main event, "Stone Cold" Steve Austin defeated Triple H and The Undertaker in an Anything Goes triple threat match to retain the WWF Championship. Also on the card, Shane McMahon defeated X-Pac to retain the WWF European Championship.

During this time, the PPV market was relatively new to the UK, as before 1997, all PPV events were broadcast for free on Sky Sports. UK-exclusive PPVs were established as a means to promote this new delivery method, however, the events were booked and treated similarly to house shows. The event was released on DVD in the UK and Europe on July 12, 2010, in a set also including Capital Carnage as part of WWE's Tagged Classics range released by Silver Vision, without any edits to the original content, most notably keeping all mentions and appearances of the WWF logo intact and un-blurred.

== Background ==
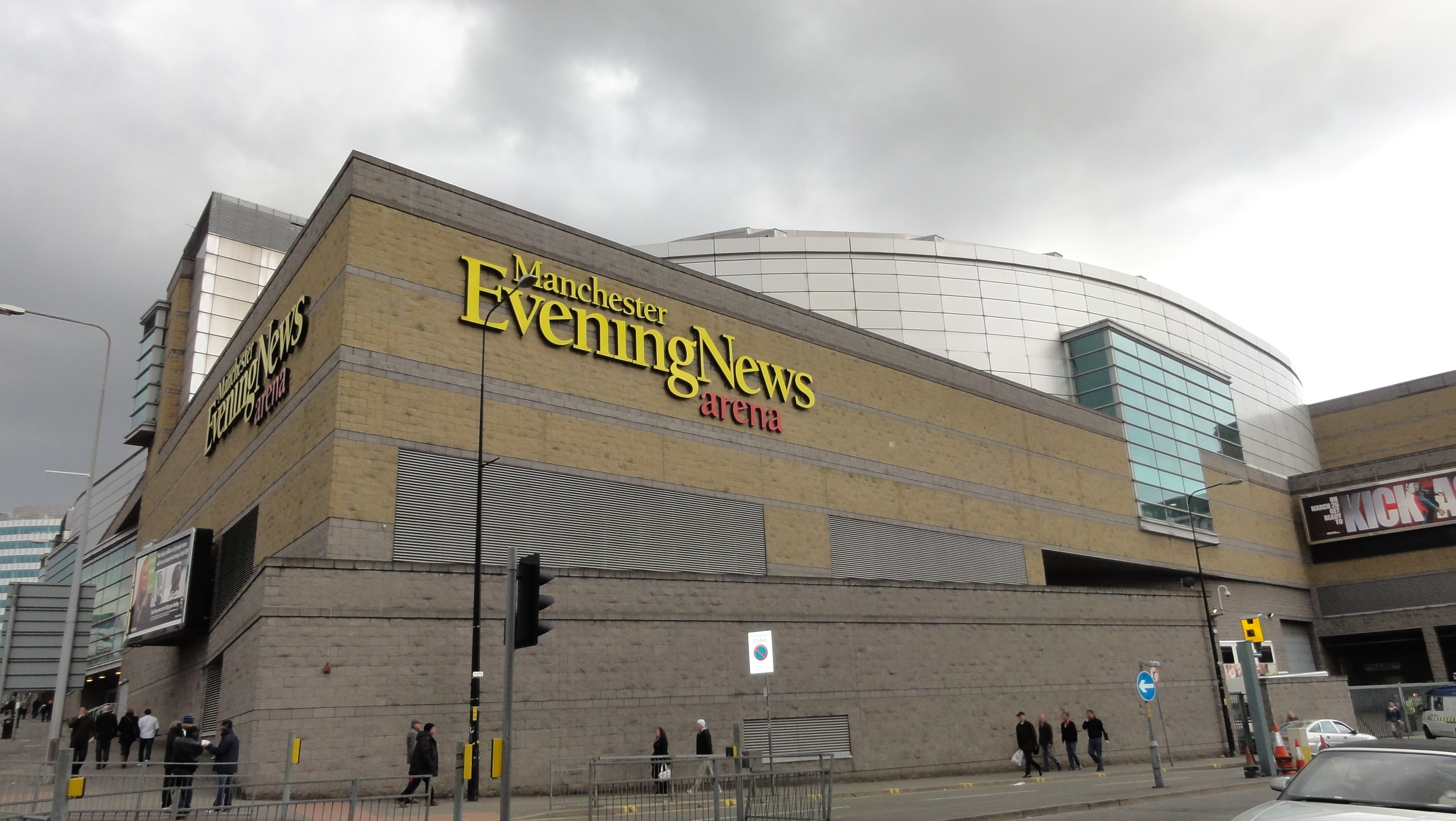
The inaugural No Mercy was held at the Manchester Evening News Arena in Manchester, England.

In 1997, the American professional wrestling company World Wrestling Federation (WWF, renamed WWE in 2002) began to hold pay-per-view (PPV) events in the United Kingdom, which were broadcast exclusively in the country. The PPV market was relatively new to the United Kingdom at the time, as before 1997, all PPV events were broadcast for free on Sky Sports. The WWF's UK-exclusive PPVs were established to serve as promotion for the new delivery method, however, they were booked and treated similarly to house shows. The WWF's third UK-exclusive PPV event was scheduled as No Mercy to be held on May 16, 1999, at the Manchester Evening News Arena in Manchester, England.

== Event ==
Other on-screen personnel
Role:	Name:
Commentators	Jim Ross
Commentators	Jerry Lawler
Interviewers	Michael Cole
Ring announcer	Tony Chimel
Referees	Mike Chioda
Referees	Teddy Long
Referees	Earl Hebner

=== Preliminary matches ===
The first match was a singles match between Tiger Ali Singh, and Gillberg. Singh quickly pinned Gillberg after a reverse neckbreaker.

The following match was between The Ministry of Darkness (Viscera, Faarooq, and Bradshaw), and The Brood (Gangrel, Edge, and Christian). Bradshaw pinned Gangrel for the victory after a Clothesline From Hell.

The third match saw Steve Blackman defeat Droz by submission using a Triangle Choke. Following that match saw Kane competing against Mideon. Mideon was disqualified after several Corporate Ministry members interfered, resulting in Kane being declared the winner.

The next planned match was between Sable, and Tori. Nicole Bass substituted for her, and the match ended quickly after Bass performed a Chokeslam on Tori. This would be Sable's last appearance in the WWF for nearly four years.

The sixth match of the night was a WWF European Championship match that saw Shane McMahon defend against X-Pac. McMahon pinned X-Pac after Triple H interfered, and gave him a Pedigree, while the referee was down. At one point, Pat Patterson and Gerald Brisco stopped Shane McMahon from leaving the match early, leading to Chyna's interference, attacking the pair to prevent further interference.

The seventh match saw Billy Gunn defeat Mankind. Gunn pinned Mankind after a Fameasser.

=== Main event matches ===
The main event match was anything goes triple threat match for the WWF Championship. Defending champion "Stone Cold" Steve Austin defeated The Undertaker (with Paul Bearer) and Triple H (with Chyna), pinning Triple H after a Stone Cold Stunner following interference from the Corporate Ministry, The Brood, Kane, X-Pac and Mankind.

== Reception ==
In 2008, J.D. Dunn of 411Mania gave the event a rating of 4.0 [Poor], stating, "The UK events rarely get top effort, and when the 1999 roster dogs it, look the fuck out! There wasn't much that was actively bad outside of Sable walking out (although who cares, really). Most of it was boring and uneventful. If the show never existed -- and in WWF [canon], it barely did – no one would notice. Thumbs down".

== Aftermath ==
A second No Mercy event was held later that same year on October 17, but in the United States in Cleveland, Ohio. This second event established No Mercy as the annual October PPV for the promotion until 2008; because of this, the following year's May UK-exclusive PPV was held as Insurrextion. In 2002, the WWF was renamed to World Wrestling Entertainment (WWE, which became an orphaned initialism in 2011). No Mercy was then discontinued and replaced by Hell in a Cell in 2009. It was reinstated in 2016 following the reintroduction of the brand extension, where the promotion divided its roster between the Raw and SmackDown brands where wrestlers were exclusively assigned to perform; the 2016 event was produced exclusively for SmackDown. The 2017 event was then Raw-exclusive, but No Mercy was discontinued again as following WrestleMania 34 in 2018, brand-exclusive PPVs were discontinued, resulting in the promotion reducing the amount of yearly PPVs produced. No Mercy was then reinstated in 2023 for WWE's developmental brand, NXT, and was held annually until 2025.

== Results ==
No.	Results	Stipulations	Times
1	Tiger Ali Singh defeated Gillberg by pinfall	Singles match	1:05
2	Ministry of Darkness (Bradshaw, Faarooq, and Viscera) defeated The Brood (Gangrel, Edge, and Christian) by pinfall	Six-man tag team match	13:49
3	Steve Blackman defeated Droz by submission	Singles match	7:43
4	Kane defeated Mideon by disqualification	Singles match	4:34
5	Nicole Bass defeated Tori by pinfall	Singles match	0:27
6	Shane McMahon (c) defeated X-Pac by pinfall	Singles match for the WWF European Championship	8:26
7	Billy Gunn defeated Mankind by pinfall	Singles match	12:17
8	"Stone Cold" Steve Austin (c) defeated Triple H (with Chyna) and The Undertaker (with Paul Bearer) by pinfall	Anything Goes triple threat match for the WWF Championship	18:27
(c) / – the champion(s) heading into the match

== See also ==
- Professional wrestling in the United Kingdom
