= Mock combat =

Undertaking combative actions without intent to harm

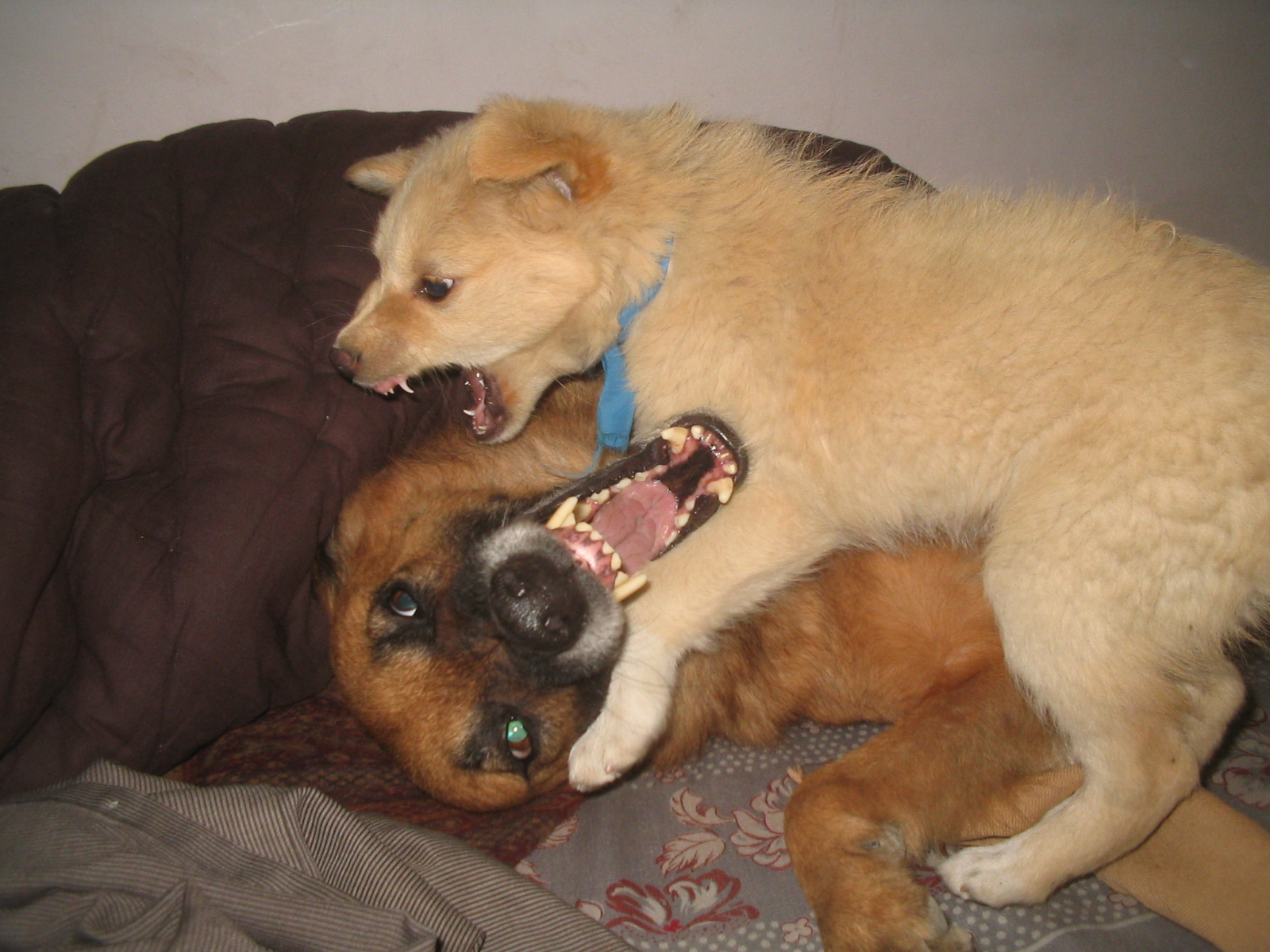
Two dogs showing threat display in playful mock combat

Mock combat involves the execution of combative actions without serious intent of harm. Participants can engage in such sparring for ritual, training, recreational or performance reasons. The nature of mock combat can vary from realistic to symbolic. Mock combat can be classified into choreographed and unchoreographed forms.

== Unchoreographed ==
- Display behaviour in tournament species
  - Threat display
- Ritual battle
  - Tinku
- Battle reenactment
- Military simulation or war games
- Sparring

== Choreographed ==
- Stage combat
- Cinematic fencing
- Arranged performance fighting
- War dance
  - Capoeira
  - Juego de maní
  - Kailao
- Kata in Japanese martial arts
- Hyung, or poomsae (in Korean martial arts)
- Professional wrestling
