= WWE in the United Kingdom =

- Created by: Vince McMahon
- Promotions: WWE
- Brands: Raw; SmackDown; NXT; NXT UK

WWE (formerly World Wrestling Federation and World Wrestling Entertainment), is an American professional wrestling promotion based in Stamford, Connecticut in the United States, owned by Endeavor. It has been promoting events in the United Kingdom (UK) since 1989.

== History ==
The 3 July 1976 edition of World of Sport included - in place of its usual coverage of British wrestling - the wrestler versus boxer match between Andre the Giant and Chuck Wepner at the WWWF's Showdown at Shea event from a few weeks earlier (as a warm-up for a screening of the Mohammed Ali versus Antonio Inoki boxing match from Tokyo). Highlights of the Chief Jay Strongbow and Billy White Wolf versus The Executioners (#1 and #2) Tag Team Two-out-of-three-falls match for the WWWF World Tag Team Championship from the same Shea Stadium show were also screened as an unadvertised extra.

In 1987 the World Wrestling Federation (WWF) received a share of ITV's Saturday afternoon wrestling coverage after the expiry of Joint Promotions' exclusive contract with the network at the end of 1986. This was originally conceived as a rotation between the WWF, Joint and UK opposition promotion All Star Wrestling. In the event only six WWF "American wrestling specials" (three per annum) were aired between the start of the arrangement and the cancellation of ITV wrestling in December 1988. During 1988-1989 editions of WWF Wrestling Challenge (billed as Superstars of Wrestling) were broadcast in the Thames, Central and Tyne Tees ITV regions in various graveyard slots.

The WWF began globally expanding in the late 1980s, holding its first European event in France in 1987 before holding events in Italy and then in Britain, where the first show was on 10 October 1989 at the London Arena, in front of a crowd of 15,000, and broadcast exclusively on Sky One. The main event in this match featured Hulk Hogan (with Miss Elizabeth) defeating Randy Savage (with Queen Sherri). From 1989 to 2001, WWE was promoted under concert promoters, brothers Harvey and Martin Goldsmith, for UK and European shows.

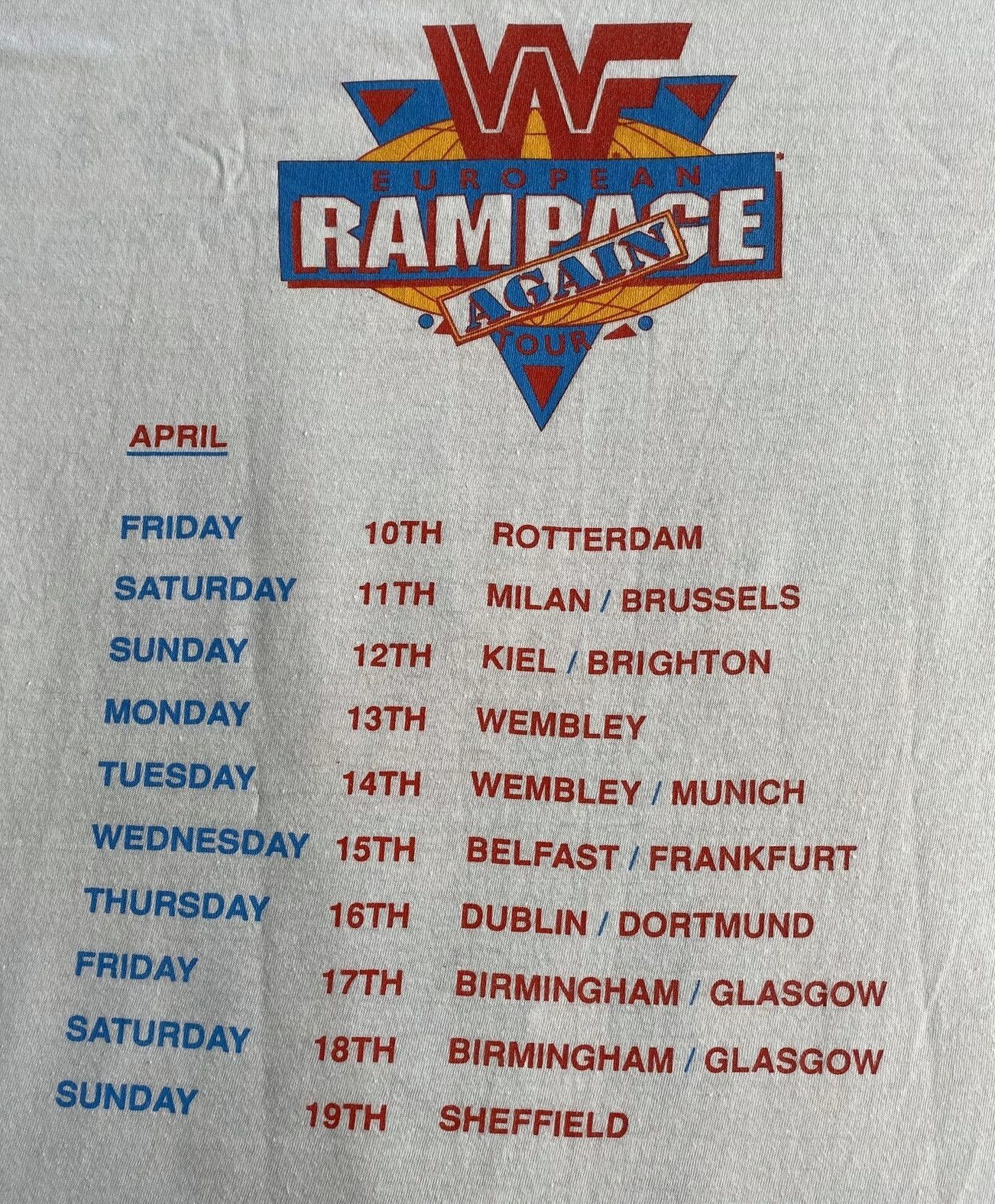
Dates of the WWF's European Rampage Again Tour shown on a t-shirt

The WWF's first tour of events in the United Kingdom and Ireland, called UK Rampage, was held between April and May 1991. The first Rampage was held in London on 24 April and was televised by BSkyB to British and Irish viewers. Four more events were held in the country later in 1991 as part of the WWF European Rampage Tour, including the supercard event Battle Royal at the Albert Hall, in London. Nine events were held in the country as part of the European Rampage Again Tour in 1992, including one televised event at Sheffield Arena (see UK Rampage (1992)). The final televised Rampage event in the country was again at Sheffield Arena on 11 April 1993 as part of the WWF European Spring Tour. Over the years, the WWF continued hosting various untelevised house shows in Britain, including Mayhem in Manchester in 1998.

SummerSlam 1992 was the first WWE pay-per-view taped in and broadcast from the UK on August 29 (aired August 31). In 1997 the company held its first UK-exclusive pay-per-view, WWF One Night Only, followed by WWF Capital Carnage in 1998 and No Mercy in 1999. From 1999 to 2002 they ran a fall pay-per-view from the UK known as WWE Rebellion. In addition from 2000 to 2003 they ran a spring pay-per-view from the UK known as WWE Insurrextion. Insurrextion in 2003 at the Telewest Arena in Newcastle marked the last of WWE's UK exclusive pay-per-views. In 2004, the WWE taped its first show of the flagship Raw program in the UK for a global audience.

== Pay-per-view events ==
Date	Name	Brand	Venue	City	Main event
29 August 1992; Aired 31 August 1992	SummerSlam (1992)		Wembley Stadium	London, England	Bret Hart (c) vs. The British Bulldog for the WWF Intercontinental Championship
20 September 1997	One Night Only		NEC Arena	Birmingham, England	The British Bulldog (c) vs. Shawn Michaels for the WWF European Championship
6 December 1998	Capital Carnage		London Arena	London, England	Stone Cold Steve Austin vs. Kane vs. Mankind vs. The Undertaker in a Fatal 4-Way match
16 May 1999	No Mercy		Manchester Evening News Arena	Manchester, England	Stone Cold Steve Austin (c) vs. Triple H vs. The Undertaker in an Anything Goes Triple Threat match for the WWF Championship
2 October 1999	Rebellion (1999)		National Indoor Arena	Birmingham, England	Triple H (c) vs. The Rock in a Steel Cage match for the WWF Championship
6 May 2000	Insurrextion (2000)		Earls Court	London, England	The Rock (c) vs. Shane McMahon vs. Triple H in a Triple Threat match for the WWF Championship
2 December 2000	Rebellion (2000)		Sheffield Arena	Sheffield, England	Kurt Angle (c) vs. Rikishi vs. Stone Cold Steve Austin vs. The Rock in a Fatal 4-Way match for the WWF Championship
5 May 2001	Insurrextion (2001)		Earls Court Exhibition Centre	London, England	The Two Man Power Trip (Stone Cold Steve Austin (c) and Triple H) vs. The Undertaker in a Handicap match for the WWF Championship
3 November 2001	Rebellion (2001)		Manchester Arena	Manchester, England	Stone Cold Steve Austin (c) vs. The Rock for the WWF Championship
4 May 2002	Insurrextion (2002)	Raw	Wembley Arena	London, England	Triple H vs. The Undertaker
26 October 2002	Rebellion (2002)	SmackDown!	Manchester Arena	Manchester, England	Brock Lesnar (c) and Paul Heyman vs. Edge in a Handicap match for the WWE Championship
7 June 2003	Insurrextion (2003)	Raw	Telewest Arena	Newcastle, England	Triple H (c) vs. Kevin Nash in a Street Fight match for the World Heavyweight Championship
3 September 2022	Clash at the Castle (2022)	Raw & SmackDown	Principality Stadium	Cardiff, Wales	Roman Reigns (c) vs. Drew McIntyre for the Undisputed WWE Universal Championship
1 July 2023	Money in the Bank (2023)	Raw & SmackDown	The O2 Arena	London, England	The Bloodline (Roman Reigns and Solo Sikoa) vs. The Usos (Jey Uso and Jimmy Uso)
June 15, 2024	Clash at the Castle (2024)	Raw & SmackDown	OVO Hydro	Glasgow, Scotland	Damian Priest (c) vs. Drew McIntyre for the World Heavyweight Championship

== Weekly television shows ==
WWE started to broadcast their weekly arena shows Raw and SmackDown! from the UK in 2004. Due to the time change, all broadcasts were recorded and aired on tape delay. Beginning in 2005 WWE would record twice per year in the United Kingdom, once in the spring and once in the fall. From 2006 to 2009, WWE's recording schedule in the United Kingdom included episodes of ECW. As of May 2019 all recordings have occurred in England, with the exception of November 2016 which took place at the SSE Hydro in Glasgow, Scotland.

=== Raw, SmackDown and ECW ===
Date	Name	Brand	Venue	City
11 October 2004	Raw	Raw	Manchester Evening News Arena	Manchester, England
12 October 2004; Aired 14 October 2004	SmackDown!	SmackDown!	Manchester Evening News Arena	Manchester, England
25 April 2005	Raw	Raw	NEC Arena	Birmingham, England
26 April 2005; Aired 28 April 2005	SmackDown!	SmackDown!	NEC Arena	Birmingham, England
21 November 2005	Raw	Raw	Hallam FM Arena	Sheffield, England
22 November 2005; Aired 25 November 2005	SmackDown!	SmackDown!	Hallam FM Arena	Sheffield, England
24 April 2006	Raw	Raw	Wembley Arena	London, England
25 April 2006; Aired 28 April 2006	SmackDown!	SmackDown!	Wembley Arena	London, England
13 November 2006	Raw	Raw	Manchester Evening News Arena	Manchester, England
14 November 2006	ECW	ECW	Manchester Evening News Arena	Manchester, England
14 November 2006; Aired 17 November 2006	SmackDown!	SmackDown!	Manchester Evening News Arena	Manchester, England
23 April 2007	Raw	Raw	Earls Court	London, England
24 April 2007	ECW	ECW	Earls Court	London, England
24 April 2007; Aired 27 April 2007	SmackDown!	SmackDown!	Earls Court	London, England
15 October 2007	Raw	Raw	National Indoor Arena	Birmingham, England
16 October 2007	ECW	ECW	National Indoor Arena	Birmingham, England
16 October 2007; Aired 19 October 2007	SmackDown!	SmackDown!	National Indoor Arena	Birmingham, England
14 April 2008	Raw	Raw	The O2 Arena	London, England
15 April 2008	ECW	ECW	The O2 Arena	London, England
15 April 2008; Aired 18 April 2008	SmackDown	SmackDown	The O2 Arena	London, England
10 November 2008	Raw	Raw	Manchester Evening News Arena	Manchester, England
11 November 2008	ECW	ECW	Manchester Evening News Arena	Manchester, England
11 November 2008; Aired 14 November 2008	SmackDown	SmackDown	Manchester Evening News Arena	Manchester, England
11 November 2008; Aired 21 November 2008	SmackDown	SmackDown	Manchester Evening News Arena	Manchester, England
20 April 2009	Raw	Raw	The O2 Arena	London, England
21 April 2009	ECW	ECW	The O2 Arena	London, England
21 April 2009; Aired 24 April 2009	SmackDown	SmackDown	The O2 Arena	London, England
9 November 2009	Raw	Raw	Sheffield Arena	Sheffield, England
10 November 2009	ECW	ECW	Sheffield Arena	Sheffield, England
10 November 2009; Aired 13 November 2009	SmackDown	SmackDown	Sheffield Arena	Sheffield, England
12 April 2010	Raw	Raw	The O2 Arena	London, England
13 April 2010; Aired 16 April 2010	SmackDown	SmackDown	The O2 Arena	London, England
8 November 2010	Raw	Raw	Manchester Evening News Arena	Manchester, England
9 November 2010; Aired 12 November 2010	SmackDown	SmackDown	Manchester Evening News Arena	Manchester, England
18 April 2011	Raw	Raw	The O2 Arena	London, England
19 April 2011; Aired 22 April 2011	SmackDown	SmackDown	The O2 Arena	London, England
7 November 2011	Raw		Echo Arena	Liverpool, England
8 November 2011; Aired 11 November 2011	SmackDown		Echo Arena	Liverpool, England
16 April 2012	Raw		The O2 Arena	London, England
17 April 2012; Aired 20 April 2012	SmackDown		The O2 Arena	London, England
5 November 2012	Raw		Birmingham LG Arena	Birmingham, England
6 November 2012; Aired 9 November 2012	SmackDown		Birmingham LG Arena	Birmingham, England
22 April 2013	Raw		The O2 Arena	London, England
23 April 2013; Aired 26 April 2013	SmackDown		The O2 Arena	London, England
11 November 2013	Raw		Phones 4 U Arena	Manchester, England
12 November 2013; Aired 15 November 2013	SmackDown		Phones 4 U Arena	Manchester, England
19 May 2014	Raw		The O2 Arena	London, England
20 May 2014; Aired 23 May 2014	SmackDown		The O2 Arena	London, England
10 November 2014	Raw		Echo Arena	Liverpool, England
11 November 2014; Aired 14 November 2014	SmackDown		Echo Arena	Liverpool, England
13 April 2015	Raw		The O2 Arena	London, England
14 April 2015; Aired 16 April 2015	SmackDown		The O2 Arena	London, England
9 November 2015	Raw		Manchester Arena	Manchester, England
10 November 2015; Aired 12 November 2015	SmackDown		Manchester Arena	Manchester, England
18 April 2016	Raw		The O2 Arena	London, England
19 April 2016; Aired 21 April 2016	SmackDown		The O2 Arena	London, England
7 November 2016	Raw	Raw	SSE Hydro	Glasgow, Scotland
8 November 2016	SmackDown	SmackDown	SSE Hydro	Glasgow, Scotland
8 May 2017	Raw	Raw	The O2 Arena	London, England
9 May 2017	SmackDown	SmackDown	The O2 Arena	London, England
6 November 2017	Raw	Raw	Manchester Arena	Manchester, England
7 November 2017	SmackDown	SmackDown	Manchester Arena	Manchester, England
14 May 2018	Raw	Raw	The O2 Arena	London, England
15 May 2018	SmackDown	SmackDown	The O2 Arena	London, England
5 November 2018	Raw	Raw	Manchester Arena	Manchester, England
6 November 2018	SmackDown	SmackDown	Manchester Arena	Manchester, England
13 May 2019	Raw	Raw	The O2 Arena	London, England
14 May 2019	SmackDown	SmackDown	The O2 Arena	London, England
8 November 2019; Aired 11 November 2019	Raw	Raw	Manchester Arena	Manchester, England
8 November 2019	SmackDown	SmackDown	Manchester Arena	Manchester, England
30 June 2023	SmackDown	SmackDown	The O2 Arena	London, England
14 June 2024	SmackDown	SmackDown	OVO Hydro	Glasgow, Scotland
24 March 2025	Raw	Raw	OVO Hydro	Glasgow, Scotland
28 March 2025	SmackDown	SmackDown	The O2 Arena	London, England
31 March 2025	Raw	Raw	The O2 Arena	London, England
25 August 2025	Raw	Raw	BP Pulse Live	Birmingham, England
16 January 2026	SmackDown	SmackDown	OVO Arena Wembley	London, England
19 January 2026	Raw	Raw	SSE Arena	Belfast, Northern Ireland
22 June 2026	Raw	Raw	The O2 Arena	London, England
23 June 2026; Aired 26 June 2026	SmackDown	SmackDown	The O2 Arena	London, England

=== NXT/NXT UK ===
On December 16, 2015, the WWE held their first NXT event in the UK, NXT TakeOver: London. In January 2017, they returned for the first United Kingdom Championship Tournament, with the second tournament in June 2018. In May 2017 they also hosted a United Kingdom Championship Special from the UK.

In a press conference at The O2 Arena on December 15, 2016, Triple H revealed that there would be a 16-man tournament to crown the inaugural WWE United Kingdom Champion. The tournament was held over a two-day period, January 14 and 15, 2017, and aired exclusively on the WWE Network. Tyler Bate won the inaugural tournament to become the first WWE United Kingdom Champion. In August 2018 Rhea Ripley became the first NXT UK Women's Champion. In January 2019, James Drake and Zack Gibson became the inaugural NXT UK Tag Team Champions.

When the championship was unveiled in December 2016, it was announced to be the top championship of a new WWE Network show, produced in the United Kingdom. However, it was not until mid-2018 when WWE formally established NXT UK as the brand for their United Kingdom division. The brand's show, also titled NXT UK, had its first tapings in July, which began airing on October 17. On January 12, 2019, the first live special episode of NXT UK aired, called NXT UK TakeOver: Blackpool.

Date	Name	Brand	Venue	City	Main event
16 December 2015	NXT TakeOver: London	NXT	SSE Arena, Wembley	Wembley, London, England	Finn Bálor vs. Samoa Joe for the NXT Championship
14 January 2017	United Kingdom Championship Tournament	NXT UK	Empress Ballroom	Blackpool, Lancashire, England	Tyler Bate vs. Tucker
15 January 2017	United Kingdom Championship Tournament	NXT UK	Empress Ballroom	Blackpool, Lancashire, England	Tyler Bate vs. Pete Dunne for the WWE United Kingdom Championship
7 May 2017 Aired 19 May	United Kingdom Championship Special	NXT UK	Epic Studios	Norwich, Norfolk, England	Tyler Bate vs. Mark Andrews for the WWE United Kingdom Championship
18 June 2018 Air date 25 June	United Kingdom Championship Tournament	NXT	Royal Albert Hall	Kensington, London, England	Zack Gibson vs. Travis Banks
19 June 2018 Air date 26 June	NXT U.K. Championship	NXT UK	Royal Albert Hall	Kensington, London, England	Pete Dunne vs. Zack Gibson for the WWE United Kingdom Championship
12 January 2019	NXT UK TakeOver: Blackpool	NXT UK	Empress Ballroom	Blackpool, Lancashire, England	Pete Dunne vs. Joe Coffey for the WWE United Kingdom Championship
31 August 2019	NXT UK TakeOver: Cardiff	NXT UK	Motorpoint Arena Cardiff	Cardiff, Wales	Walter vs. Tyler Bate for the WWE United Kingdom Championship
12 January 2020	NXT UK TakeOver: Blackpool II	NXT UK	Empress Ballroom	Blackpool, Lancashire, England	Walter vs. Joe Coffey for the WWE United Kingdom Championship

== Domestic broadcast ==
WWE programming were originally broadcast (then as WWF) in Britain on the Sky network of premium television channels beginning in the 1980s, with a small selection of shows (including Sunday Night Heat and four pay-per-views a year) briefly being broadcast on Channel 4 in 2000 and 2001. During 2004, four of the company's pay-per-views were broadcast on PPV service Setanta Sport. In 2014, WWE renewed a 5-year deal with Sky to carry programmes through the end of 2019, which included Main Event being added to the schedule.

In June 2019, BT Sport (known as TNT Sports since 2023) announced that they had gained the broadcasting rights for WWE in the UK; their deal began in January 2020. The broadcasting deal with TNT Sports expired at the end of 2024, after which Raw and SmackDown broadcast live on Netflix in the country.

WWE's online streaming service, WWE Network, launched on 19 January 2015 in the United Kingdom. The service closed in the country in January 2025 as part of the global WWE-Netflix deal.

Current domestic transmissions of WWE TV programming
Programming	Day	Network/Platform
WWE Premium Live Events	Dates vary (Live)	Netflix
WWE Raw	Mondays (Live)	Netflix
WWE NXT	Tuesdays (Live)	Netflix
WWE SmackDown	Fridays (Live)	Netflix
WWE Evolve	Wednesdays	YouTube
WWE Main Event	Saturdays	YouTube
Saturday Night's Main Event	Saturdays Quarterly (Live)	YouTube

== WWE Performance Center ==
The second WWE Performance Center branch opened on 11 January 2019 in Enfield, London.

== See also ==
- Professional wrestling in the United Kingdom
- List of professional wrestling attendance records in the United Kingdom
