= Rebellion (1999) =

World Wrestling Federation pay-per-view event

- VHS cover featuring The Rock, Triple H, Kane, Big Show, Jeff Jarrett, and Chyna
- Promotion: World Wrestling Federation
- Date: October 2, 1999
- City: Birmingham, England
- Venue: National Indoor Arena
- Attendance: 13,500

Pay-per-view chronology
← Previous; Unforgiven	Next → No Mercy

Rebellion chronology
← Previous; First	Next → 2000

WWE in Europe chronology
← Previous; No Mercy	Next → Insurrextion

The 1999 Rebellion was a professional wrestling pay-per-view (PPV) event produced by the American promotion World Wrestling Federation (WWF, renamed WWE in 2002). It was the inaugural Rebellion and was the company's fourth PPV event to air exclusively in the United Kingdom. The event took place on Saturday, October 2, 1999, at the National Indoor Arena in Birmingham, England.

Eleven matches were held at the event, including one dark match before the live broadcast. In the main event, Triple H defeated The Rock in a Steel Cage match to retain the WWF Championship. Other prominent matches saw Jeff Jarrett defeat D'Lo Brown to retain the WWF Intercontinental Championship, Ivory defeated Jacqueline, Luna Vachon, and Tori in a Four Corners match to retain the WWF Women's Championship, and The British Bulldog defeated X-Pac.

== Production ==
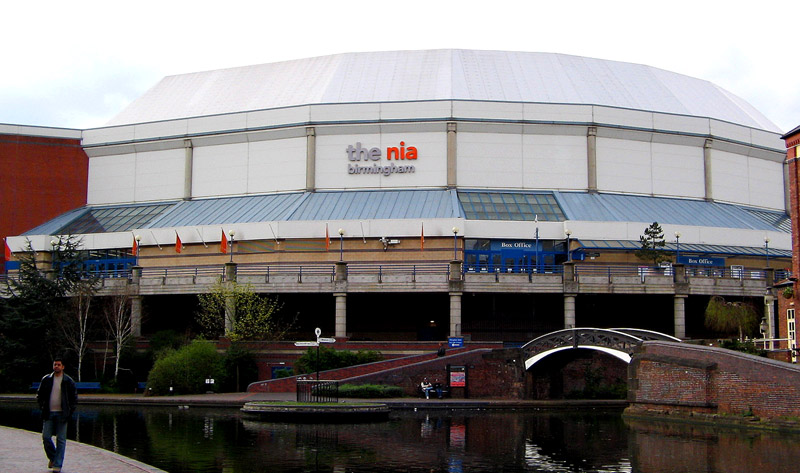
The inaugural Rebellion was held at the National Indoor Arena in Birmingham, England.

=== Background ===
In 1997, the American professional wrestling company World Wrestling Federation (WWF, renamed WWE in 2002) began to hold pay-per-view (PPV) events in the United Kingdom, which were broadcast exclusively in the country. The PPV market was relatively new to the United Kingdom at the time, as before 1997, all PPV events were broadcast for free on Sky Sports. The WWF's UK-exclusive PPVs were established to serve as promotion for the new delivery method, however, they were booked and treated similarly to house shows. The WWF's fourth UK-exclusive PPV event was scheduled as Rebellion to be held on Saturday, October 2, 1999, at the National Indoor Arena in Birmingham, England. This was the first time that the WWF held two UK-exclusive PPVs in one calendar year.

=== Storylines ===
The event featured 11 professional wrestling matches, including one dark match before the live broadcast. The matches involved different wrestlers from pre-existing scripted feuds and storylines. These storylines were played out on the WWF's weekly television programs, Raw and SmackDown!.

== Event ==
Other on-screen personnel
Role:	Name:
Commentators	Jim Ross
Commentators	Michael Hayes
Interviewer	Michael Cole
Ring announcer	Tony Chimel
Referees	Mike Chioda
Referees	Earl Hebner
Referees	Tim White

Prior to the start of the event, Christian defeated Crash Holly, in a dark match.

The first match saw WWF Intercontinental Champion Jeff Jarrett take on European Champion D'Lo Brown. Prior to the start of the match a coin toss was used to determine which championship would be on the line. Ultimately it was determined that the Intercontinental Championship was on the line, in a match which saw Jarrett retain his title.

The second match saw The Godfather defeat Gangrel, following a Pimp Drop. After the match, The Godfather convinced referee Tim White to dance with him and the hoes.

Prior to the next match, it was announced that the WWE would be hosting another UK exclusive pay-per-view on May 6, 2000, which would be the inaugural Insurrextion.

Next Val Venis defeated Mark Henry following the Money Shot.

In a backstage segment The British Bulldog angrily confronted Vince McMahon and Shane McMahon about not getting a WWF title shot in his home country and, in his anger, threw a garbage can across the room, which accidentally hit Stephanie McMahon.

The WWF Women's Championship match was next, in a Four Corners match. During this match Ivory defended her title against Jacqueline, Luna Vachon and Tori. Ivory successfully defended her title when she hit Jackie in the face with the belt.

Next Chris Jericho defeated Road Dogg following a low blow.

The following match was an intergender match, which saw Chyna take on Jeff Jarrett. After Chyna hit the pedigree on Jarrett, The British Bulldog interfered and clotheslined Chyna, resulting in her victory via disqualification. Following the match, the two continued their attack on Chyna, which concluded when Jarrett put Chyna in a figure-4.

The next match was a No Disqualification match between Kane and Big Show. Kane ultimately picked up the victory when he kicked a chair into Big Show's face followed by a bodyslam.

The following match saw The British Bulldog defeat X-Pac. This was followed by a triangle match which saw Edge and Christian defeat The Acolytes (Bradshaw and Faarooq) and The Hollys (Crash Holly and Hardcore Holly).

The main event was a Steel Cage match for the WWF Championship. This match saw the champion Triple H defend his title against The Rock. The British Bulldog came out during the match when The Rock was attempted to escape, knocking him down while trying to climb out. Chyna later came out and slammed the door on The Rock's face when he went to escape. After Triple H escaped the cage, Vince McMahon came out and locked The British Bulldog in the cage in retribution for his attack on Stephanie McMahon earlier. The Rock attacked The British Bulldog before eventually leaving over the top of the cage.

== Aftermath ==
The British Bulldog and Stephanie McMahon's (kayfabe) fiancée Test briefly feuded when as a result of Bulldog's attack on her, Stephanie forgot how she felt for Test. Stephanie McMahon's memory later recovered and the two attempted to marry on the November 29, 1999 episode of Raw, only for Triple H (who was feuding with Vince McMahon at the time) to reveal he had married Stephanie.

A second Rebellion event was held the following year, also in the United Kingdom, thus establishing Rebellion as an annual UK-exclusive PPV for the promotion. The event was discontinued after its 2002 event as the promotion started to broadcast Raw and SmackDown from the UK in 2004.

== Reception ==
In 2008, J.D. Dunn of 411Mania gave the event a rating of 6.5 [Average], stating, "An interesting show because it had a storyline which ran through the PPV and actually led an angle in the regular continuity. The main event is good, as are the Jericho and Jarrett matches. Not a "must-buy" by any means, but it's a mildly diverting show. Thumbs in the middle tilting up."

== Results ==
No.	Results	Stipulations	Times
1^{D}	Christian defeated Crash Holly	Singles match	4:39
2	Jeff Jarrett (c) (with Miss Kitty) defeated D'Lo Brown	Singles match for the WWF Intercontinental Championship	6:12
3	The Godfather defeated Gangrel	Singles match	6:19
4	Val Venis defeated Mark Henry	Singles match	3:47
5	Ivory (c) defeated Jacqueline, Luna Vachon, and Tori	Four Corners match for the WWF Women's Championship	6:51
6	Chris Jericho (with Curtis Hughes) defeated Road Dogg	Singles match	11:58
7	Chyna defeated Jeff Jarrett (with Miss Kitty) by disqualification	Singles match	4:28
8	Kane defeated Big Show	No Disqualification match	8:38
9	The British Bulldog defeated X-Pac	Singles match	5:23
10	Edge and Christian defeated The Acolytes (Bradshaw and Faarooq) and The Hollys (Crash Holly and Hardcore Holly)	Triangle match	8:42
11	Triple H (c) defeated The Rock by escaping the cage	Steel Cage match for the WWF Championship	20:33
(c) / – the champion(s) heading into the match; D / – this was a dark match

== See also ==
- Professional wrestling in the United Kingdom
