= No Mercy (1999) =

World Wrestling Federation pay-per-view event

- Promotional poster featuring Mankind
- Promotion: World Wrestling Federation
- Date: October 17, 1999
- City: Cleveland, Ohio
- Venue: Gund Arena
- Attendance: 18,742
- Buy rate: 298,000
- Tagline: Show No Compassion, Remorse or Mercy

Pay-per-view chronology
← Previous; Rebellion	Next → Survivor Series

No Mercy chronology
← Previous; 1999 (UK)	Next → 2000

The 1999 No Mercy held in the United States was a professional wrestling pay-per-view (PPV) event produced by the World Wrestling Federation (WWF, renamed WWE in 2002). It was the second No Mercy and took place on October 17, 1999, at the Gund Arena in Cleveland, Ohio. While the previous No Mercy was held exclusively for the United Kingdom earlier in May, this event was moved to the United States and established No Mercy as the annual October PPV.

Nine matches, including three championship matches, took place at the event. In the first, The Fabulous Moolah won the WWF Women's Championship from Ivory to become the oldest champion in professional wrestling history at the time. In the second, Chyna defeated Jeff Jarrett to win the WWF Intercontinental Championship, becoming the only female holder of the men's Intercontinental Championship in the promotion's history. Lastly, Triple H defeated "Stone Cold" Steve Austin to retain the WWF Championship. Also on the card was a tag team ladder match in which The New Brood (Jeff Hardy and Matt Hardy) defeated Edge and Christian. The event also marked the last appearance of Jeff Jarrett in the promotion until 2019.

Reviews for the event were generally positive. Both SLAM! Wrestling and 411Mania rated the event 8 out of 10. The tag team ladder match in particular received very positive reviews from critics.

== Production ==
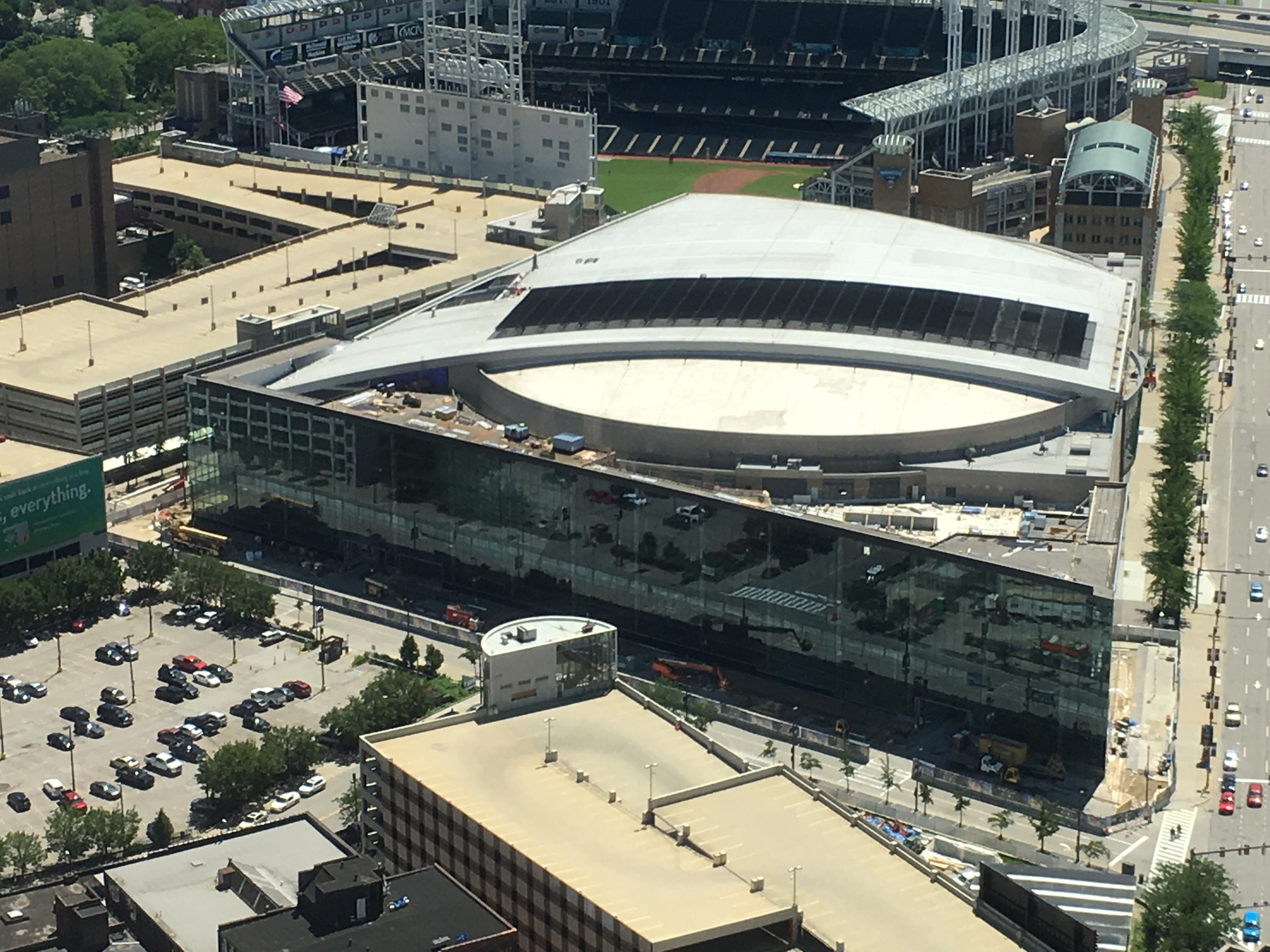
The second No Mercy was held at the Gund Arena in Cleveland, Ohio.

=== Background ===
From May 1995 to February 1999, the professional wrestling company World Wrestling Federation (WWF, renamed WWE in 2002) ran a series of pay-per-view (PPV) events titled In Your House. They aired when the promotion was not holding one of its then-five major PPVs (WrestleMania, King of the Ring, SummerSlam, Survivor Series, and Royal Rumble) and were sold at a lower cost. Following St. Valentine's Day Massacre: In Your House in February 1999, the In Your House branding was retired to give each monthly PPV a permanent identity. After the WWF held No Mercy as a United Kingdom-exclusive PPV event in May 1999, a second No Mercy was scheduled for later that same year, but in the United States to be the promotion's annual October PPV. It was held on October 17, 1999, at the Gund Arena in Cleveland, Ohio.

Before the event, Jeff Jarrett was on his way out of the WWF, as management felt he had been a bad investment for the company. WWF Chairman Vince McMahon came up with the idea for Jarrett and Chyna to become involved in a storyline together. Vince Russo was asked to write the storyline leading up to the match, including when Jarrett would taunt Chyna and hit her with random household objects. The fans responded positively to the battle-of-the-sexes match-ups. They were originally supposed to have their match-up at Rebellion, but the WWF extended the storyline for another month due to its popularity. During the feud, Russo left the WWF for rival promotion World Championship Wrestling (WCW). In her autobiography If They Only Knew, Chyna implied that Russo was the person who convinced McMahon to delay their pay-per-view match for a month, because he knew Jarrett was also going to sign with WCW. Because of the delay, Jarrett's contract expired the day before the match, so he was not contractually required to wrestle at the event. Hours before the event began, Jarrett demanded (and received) somewhere between $300,000 and $500,000 to wrestle Chyna for the night.

=== Storylines ===
Nine professional wrestling matches were featured on the event's card. Matches were planned with predetermined outcomes by WWF's creative staff and featured wrestlers for the entertainment of the audience.

Leading up to their match at No Mercy, Jeff Jarrett would taunt Chyna and hit her with random household objects. He also began a gimmick where he would degrade women, which involved him attacking female WWF employees. At Rebellion, Chyna defeated Jarrett by disqualification after the British Bulldog interfered and clotheslined Chyna. During this time, Jarrett also introduced Miss Kitty to be the valet for his manager Debra.

Before No Mercy, The New Brood (Jeff Hardy and Matt Hardy) were in a rivalry with Edge and Christian and the two teams were amid the Terri Invitational Tournament, where the winning team would win the managerial services of Terri Runnels. The series was a "best-of-five" and began on the September 30 episode of SmackDown! when Edge and Christian defeated The New Brood in the first match of the tournament. In the weeks preceding the pay-per-view, the teams traded wins until both teams had two each. Therefore, the match at No Mercy would be the deciding match in the tournament.

Triple H and "Stone Cold" Steve Austin were also feuding heading into the event. They had a Triple Threat match, also including The Undertaker, at the previous No Mercy pay-per-view in May; in the match, Austin defeated Triple H to retain the WWF Championship. In the following months, the WWF Championship was traded back and forth amongst Austin, The Undertaker, Mankind, Triple H, and Vince McMahon. In late September at Unforgiven, Triple H won the championship in a match against five other wrestlers, including The Rock, with Austin as the Special Guest Referee. At the beginning of October at Rebellion, Triple H retained his title in a steel cage match against The Rock.

== Event ==
Other on-screen personnel
Role:	Name:
English commentators	Jim Ross
English commentators	Jerry Lawler
Spanish commentators	Carlos Cabrera
Spanish commentators	Hugo Savinovich
Interviewer	Michael Cole
Ring announcer	Howard Finkel
Referees	Mike Chioda
Referees	Earl Hebner
Referees	Jim Korderas
Referees	Tim White
Referees	Theodore Long

The first match was between The Godfather, and Mideon in a singles match. During the match, Viscera interfered several times on behalf of Mideon. The Godfather, however, won the match after pinning Mideon.

Subsequently, The Fabulous Moolah, accompanied by her friend Mae Young, and Ivory, the reigning WWF Women's Champion, went to the ring for their match. Ivory immediately performed a dropkick on Moolah. After interference from Young, Moolah surprised Ivory by pinning her, and winning the Women's Championship. At the time, Moolah was in her seventies, thus becoming the oldest champion in the history of professional wrestling.

The Hollys (Hardcore Holly and Crash Holly) versus the New Age Outlaws (Billy Gunn and The Road Dogg) was next. During the match, Hardcore Holly threw a steel chair into the ring. Billy Gunn, however, used the chair to his advantage by performing an offensive maneuver on Crash Holly that caused his head to slam into the chair, which was lying in the ring. Therefore, the Hollys won the match by disqualification.

The fourth match of the night was between Chyna, and Jeff Jarrett in a Good Housekeeping match—a hardcore match where the ring is surrounded by household objects, which the wrestlers can use against each other—for the WWF Intercontinental Championship. After Jarrett hit Chyna with the Intercontinental title belt, he pinned her. The referee Theodore Long, however, overturned the ruling because the belt was not considered a "household item". As a result, Jarrett performed a submission maneuver on Long, but Chyna hit him over the head with a guitar. She then pinned him to win the title. With the win, Chyna became the first woman to ever hold the title. Also, as a result of the win, Jarrett's valet Miss Kitty left Jarrett to valet for Chyna.

Subsequently, The Rock defeated The British Bulldog in a singles match by performing a Rock Bottom, and People's Elbow. After the match, The Rock cut a promo where he challenged the winner of the main event to a match. Triple H, however, came out and hit The Rock with a sledgehammer, which caused The Rock to be taken backstage on a stretcher. Backstage, The Rock refused to be taken to the hospital.

The following bout was the last match in the Terri Invitational Tournament, contested between The New Brood (Matt Hardy and Jeff Hardy) and Edge and Christian in a tag team ladder match. For the match, a bag with $100,000 was hung from the ceiling, and the goal of the match was to use one of the two ladders in the ring to climb and retrieve the bag. The first team to retrieve the bag would win the match. The manager of The New Brood, Gangrel brought a ladder to the ring, but as a result, he got ejected from the ringside by the referee. During the match, the ladders were set up so that one was on top of the other, resembling a Seesaw, Jeff jumped on one side so that the other side jutted upwards, knocking down both Matt and Christian. Later in the match, all four men were on the ladders and after Edge pushed Matt off the ladder they were both on, he fell into the other ladder, knocking Christian to the mat. Jeff, however, jumped onto the other ladder to continue to battle with Edge. As Jeff and Edge climbed the ladder, Jeff pushed Edge to the ground and grabbed the bag of money to win the match. As a result of winning the match, The New Brood won $100,000 and the managerial services of Terri Runnels. Backstage, the trio celebrated the win and their new partnership with a bottle of champagne.

The seventh match of the night was between Val Venis and Mankind. During the match, Venis slammed Mankind back-first into a steel chair which was lying in the ring. When Mankind tried to perform a mandible claw on Venis, he retaliated by simultaneously grabbing Mankind's crotch. As a result, both men collapsed, but because Venis landed on top of Mankind—causing a pinning predicament—Venis defeated his opponent.

The second to last match was between X-Pac, Bradshaw, Kane, and Faarooq in a Four Corners Elimination match. Eight minutes into the match, Kane performed a chokeslam on Bradshaw to pin and eliminate him from the match. Approximately two minutes later, X-Pac performed a spinning heel kick on Kane and pinned him to eliminate him. X-Pac eliminated Faarooq by using the X Factor to win the match.

Triple H defeated "Stone Cold" Steve Austin in an Anything Goes match for the WWF Championship. When Triple H attempted to use his sledgehammer against Austin, Vince McMahon grabbed it from him. They spent seven minutes of the match outside the ring, where Austin used a steel fence, trash can, and microphone as weapons. Once in the ring, both men attempted to end the match by utilizing their finishing maneuvers. Back outside of the ring, Austin threw Triple H into both the steel ring stairs and the announce table, causing him to bleed profusely. Near the end of the match, The Rock, bandaged from his injuries earlier in the night, came down to the ringside carrying the sledgehammer. Although he was aiming at Triple H, he accidentally hit Austin with the weapon. Triple H performed a Pedigree on The Rock and pinned Austin to retain the WWF Championship. After the match, Austin and Triple H continued to fight into the backstage area, where Chyna picked Triple H up in a limousine and drove away.

== Reception ==
John Powell of SLAM! Wrestling said that the tag match between the Hardy Boyz, Edge, and Christian overshadowed the main event match between Triple H and Steve Austin. He called the match "astonishing", and claimed it "brought the crowd to their feet". Specifically, he claimed that both The Hardy Boyz and Edge and Christian "were the future of the federation" and deserved "a hefty raise". Powell also liked the match between The Rock and The British Bulldog, calling it "A well-fought, explosive encounter". In contrast, Powell stated that the women's match was the "worst match [he'd] ever seen". Overall, he rated the event eight out of ten.

In 2008, J.D. Dunn of 411Mania gave the event a rating of 8.0 [Very Good]. He called the tag team ladder match "1999's WWE MOTY [Match of the Year] by most accounts" and rated it four and one-fourth stars out of five. In addition, he called the Chyna-Jarrett match "a goofy-but-fun match" and claimed "The Jarrett-Chyna feud was one of the best of the year, although that's not saying much." The main event of Triple H versus Austin achieved three out of five stars.

== Aftermath ==
The Terri Invitational Tournament, and the tag team ladder match between The New Brood (later known as The Hardy Boyz), and Edge, and Christian elevated both teams. According to Matt Hardy, the match elevated them from "WWF wrestlers to WWF Superstars". Both teams received standing ovations the night of the match, as well as the following night on Raw is War. It also led to WWE utilizing ladder matches more frequently. The two teams would keep feuding off, and on over tag team titles for most of the next two years in a three-way feud also involving The Dudley Boyz, during which the WWF created the Tables, ladders, and chairs match.

After No Mercy, Jeff Jarrett left the World Wrestling Federation (WWF) and showed up on WCW Monday Nitro the next evening. Miss Kitty began accompanying Chyna to the ring for her matches. Kitty also began dressing like Chyna, including wearing a black wig, and became known as "Chynette". Chyna then began a rivalry with Chris Jericho over the championship. Chyna defeated Jericho at the subsequent pay-per-view Survivor Series in November to retain the title. Jarrett would ultimately be fired by Vince McMahon in 2001 when WWF acquired the assets of WCW.

Triple H held the WWF Championship until Survivor Series in November when he lost it to The Big Show in a Triple Threat match that also involved The Rock. Meanwhile, "Stone Cold" Steve Austin was written out of WWF storylines so he could have neck surgery. On-screen, his absence was attributed to being hit by a car. When he returned to television a year later, it was revealed that Rikishi had hit him with a car to allow The Rock to become champion; however, The Rock did not win the championship until Backlash in April 2000. Later, it was revealed that the hit-and-run on Austin was orchestrated by Triple H.

This U.S.-based No Mercy event established No Mercy as the annual October PPV for the promotion that was renamed to World Wrestling Entertainment (WWE) in 2002. The event continued to be held until 2008, as it was replaced by Hell in a Cell in 2009, which became the annual October PPV. No Mercy was reinstated in October 2016, but was moved up to September in 2017, after which, No Mercy was discontinued as following WrestleMania 34 in 2018, brand-exclusive PPVs were discontinued, resulting in the promotion reducing the amount of yearly PPVs produced. No Mercy would eventually be reinstated once again in 2023 for the NXT brand and positioned as an annual September livestreaming event until 2025.

Bradshaw and Farooq began transitioning from the Acolytes to the "Acolyte Protection Agency" (APA), who liked to gamble at cards, get into barfights, and were available to hire for "protection".

== Results ==
No.	Results	Stipulations	Times
1	The Godfather defeated Mideon (with Viscera)	Singles match	7:31
2	The Fabulous Moolah (with Mae Young) defeated Ivory (c)	Singles match for the WWF Women's Championship	3:01
3	The Hollys (Hardcore Holly and Crash Holly) defeated The New Age Outlaws (Billy Gunn and Road Dogg) by disqualification	Tag team match	10:11
4	Chyna defeated Jeff Jarrett (c) (with Miss Kitty)	Intergender Good Housekeeping match for the WWF Intercontinental Championship	9:57
5	The Rock defeated The British Bulldog	Singles match	6:20
6	The New Brood (Jeff Hardy and Matt Hardy) (with Gangrel) defeated Edge and Christian by retrieving the bag of money	Ladder match for the managerial services of Terri Runnels and $100,000	16:30
7	Val Venis defeated Mankind	Singles match	9:26
8	X-Pac defeated Bradshaw, Faarooq, and Kane	Four corners elimination match	10:08
9	Triple H (c) defeated "Stone Cold" Steve Austin	No Holds Barred match for the WWF Championship	21:55
(c) / – the champion(s) heading into the match
