= Rebellion (2001) =

World Wrestling Federation pay-per-view event

- DVD cover featuring "Stone Cold" Steve Austin, The Rock, Kurt Angle, and Chris Jericho
- Promotion: World Wrestling Federation
- Date: November 3, 2001
- City: Manchester, England
- Venue: Manchester Evening News Arena
- Attendance: 15,612
- Tagline: Manchester Divided

Pay-per-view chronology
← Previous; No Mercy	Next → Survivor Series

Rebellion chronology
← Previous; 2000	Next → 2002

WWE in Europe chronology
← Previous; Insurrextion (2001)	Next → Insurrextion (2002)

The 2001 Rebellion was a professional wrestling pay-per-view (PPV) event produced by the American promotion World Wrestling Federation (WWF, now WWE) and broadcast exclusively in the United Kingdom. It was third annual Rebellion and took place on November 3, 2001, at the Manchester Evening News Arena in Manchester, England. It was the final Rebellion produced before the promotion introduced the brand extension in March 2002 and the final Rebellion promoted under the WWF name, as the promotion was renamed to World Wrestling Entertainment (WWE) in May 2002.

The event took place during The Invasion period for the WWF, which ended at the next pay-per-view, Survivor Series. All matches had one member of the WWF taking on one member of The Alliance, composed of wrestlers originally from the former World Championship Wrestling and Extreme Championship Wrestling promotions. Over the course of the evening, the WWF won six matches, while the Alliance won three.

== Production ==
=== Background ===
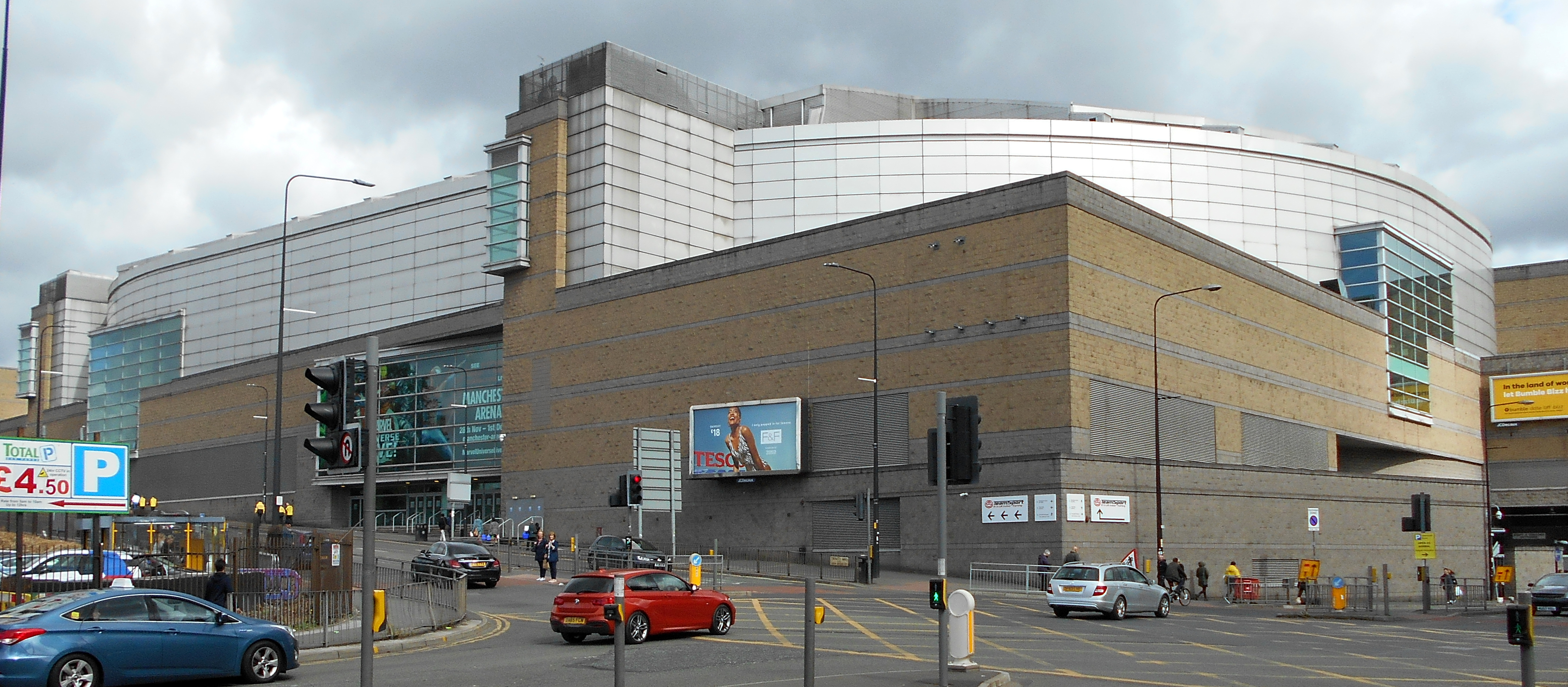
The third annual Rebellion was held at the Manchester Arena in Manchester, England.

Rebellion was an annual professional wrestling pay-per-view (PPV) event produced by the American promotion World Wrestling Federation (WWF, now WWE) since 1999 and broadcast exclusively in the United Kingdom. It was one of two annual UK-exclusive PPVs, along with Insurrextion. The third Rebellion was scheduled to be held on Saturday, November 3, 2001, at the Manchester Arena in Manchester, England.

=== Storylines ===
The event featured nine professional wrestling matches and two pre-show matches that involved different wrestlers from pre-existing scripted feuds and storylines.

== Event ==
Other on-screen personnel
Role:	Name:
Commentators	Jim Ross
Commentators	Paul Heyman
Interviewers	Michael Cole
Interviewers	Chavo Guerrero
Interviewers	Hugh Morrus
Ring announcer	Tony Chimel
Referees	Mike Chioda
Referees	Earl Hebner
Referees	Chad Patton
Referees	Brian Hebner
Referees	Charles Robinson
Referees	Nick Patrick

Prior to the start of the pay-per-view, Billy and Chuck representing WWF defeated Justin Credible and Lance Storm representing The Alliance.

The first match of the pay-per-view was a steel cage match for the WWF Intercontinental Championship. Edge representing the WWF defeated Christian representing the Alliance, by escaping the cage while Christian's leg was stuck in between the rope and cage.

The second match saw Scotty 2 Hotty, representing the WWF, by hitting a bulldog followed by The Worm on The Hurricane, representing the Alliance, for the win. Following this Big Show, representing the WWF, defeated Diamond Dallas Page, representing the Alliance, by performing a chokeslam on DDP.

The next match was an Elimination Triple Threat match for the WCW Tag Team Championship. The Dudley Boyz (Bubba Ray Dudley and D-Von Dudley), representing the Alliance, beat both WWF teams, The APA (Bradshaw and Faarooq) and The Hardy Boyz (Jeff Hardy and Matt Hardy). Matt first eliminated Faarooq after the Dudleyz hit a reverse neckbreaker on him, followed by a Twist of Fate. D-Von then pinned Matt after Jeff missed a Swanton and the Dudleyz hit Matt with a 3-D.

The following match saw William Regal, representing the Alliance, defeating Tajiri, representing the WWF, via submission with the Regal Stretch.

The WCW Championship match was next. This match saw Chris Jericho, representing the WWF, defending his title against Kurt Angle, representing the Alliance. Jericho successfully retained his title after he rolled up Angle as he was going for the Olympic Slam. After the match, Angle attacked Jericho, hitting him with two Olympic Slams.

The penultimate match was a women's tag team match with Trish Stratus as special guest referee. The match saw Lita and Torrie Wilson, representing the WWF, taking on Mighty Molly and Stacy Keibler, representing the Alliance. After Wilson threw Holly into the corner, Lita hit Holly with a Twist of Fate to pick up the pinfall victory. After the match, Keibler argued with Stratus over the ending, to which Stratus responded by hitting Keibler with a bulldog.

The main event was for the WWF Championship. This match saw "Stone Cold" Steve Austin, representing the Alliance, defending his title against The Rock, representing the WWF. While the referee was down, Kurt Angle came out to the ring and hit The Rock with a chair. Jericho came out and attacked Angle, grabbing the chair. When The Rock stood up, he saw Jericho with the chair, assuming he was the one who attacked him, and The Rock attacked Jericho. The match ended when The Rock went for the People's Elbow; However, Angle hit The Rock in the face with the belt as he hit the ropes, enabling Austin to hit the Stone Cold Stunner and retain the title.

== Aftermath ==
The 2001 Rebellion was the final Rebellion event produced under the WWF name, as the company was renamed to World Wrestling Entertainment (WWE) in May 2002. It was also the final Rebellion produced before the promotion introduced the brand extension in March 2002, which divided the roster into two separate brands, Raw and SmackDown!, where wrestlers were exclusively assigned to perform. The following year's event was subsequently a SmackDown!-exclusive show.

== Results ==
No.	Results	Stipulations	Times
1^{D}	Billy and Chuck (WWF) defeated Justin Credible and Lance Storm (Alliance) by pinfall	Tag team match	5:00
2	Edge (c) (WWF) defeated Christian (Alliance) by escaping the cage	Steel Cage match for the WWF Intercontinental Championship	12:49
3	Scotty 2 Hotty (WWF) defeated The Hurricane (Alliance) by pinfall	Singles match	8:55
4	Big Show (WWF) defeated Diamond Dallas Page (Alliance) by pinfall	Singles match	3:15
5	The Dudley Boyz (Bubba Ray Dudley and D-Von Dudley) (c) (Alliance) defeated The APA (Faarooq and Bradshaw) (WWF) and The Hardy Boyz (Matt Hardy and Jeff Hardy) (WWF) by pinfall	Triple threat match for the WCW Tag Team Championship	12:01
6	William Regal (Alliance) defeated Tajiri (WWF) by submission	Singles match	5:55
7	Chris Jericho (c) (WWF) defeated Kurt Angle (Alliance) by pinfall	Singles match for the WCW Championship	14:53
8	Lita and Torrie Wilson (WWF) defeated Mighty Molly and Stacy Keibler (Alliance) by pinfall	Tag team match Trish Stratus served as the special guest referee.	4:16
9	"Stone Cold" Steve Austin (c) (Alliance) defeated The Rock (WWF) by pinfall	Singles match for the WWF Championship	22:09
(c) / – the champion(s) heading into the match; D / – this was a dark match

== See also ==
- Professional wrestling in the United Kingdom
