= Rebellion (2000) =

World Wrestling Federation pay-per-view event

- VHS cover featuring The Undertaker, The Rock, Kurt Angle, Lita, and Trish Stratus
- Promotion: World Wrestling Federation
- Date: December 2, 2000
- City: Sheffield, England
- Venue: Sheffield Arena
- Attendance: 11,077

Pay-per-view chronology
← Previous; Survivor Series	Next → Armageddon

Rebellion chronology
← Previous; 1999	Next → 2001

WWE in Europe chronology
← Previous; Insurrextion (2000)	Next → Insurrextion (2001)

The 2000 Rebellion was a professional wrestling pay-per-view (PPV) event produced by the American promotion World Wrestling Federation (WWF, now WWE) and broadcast exclusively in the United Kingdom. It was the second annual Rebellion and took place on December 2, 2000, at the Sheffield Arena in Sheffield, England.

== Production ==
=== Background ===
In 1999, the American professional wrestling promotion World Wrestling Federation (WWF, now WWE) held a pay-per-view (PPV) event titled Rebellion, which was broadcast exclusively in the United Kingdom. The following year, a second Rebellion PPV was announced to be held on Saturday, December 2, 2000, at the Sheffield Arena in Sheffield, England, thus establishing Rebellion as an annual UK-exclusive PPV for the promotion.

=== Storylines ===
The event featured nine professional wrestling matches and two pre-show matches that involved different wrestlers from pre-existing scripted feuds and storylines.

== Event ==
Other on-screen personnel
Role:	Name:
English commentators	Jim Ross
English commentators	Tazz
Interviewer	Michael Cole
Ring announcer	Tony Chimel
Referees	Mike Chioda
Referees	Earl Hebner
Referees	Chad Patton
Referees	Tim White
Referees	Theodore Long

The opening match was an elimination tables match. This match saw The Dudley Boyz (Bubba Ray Dudley and D-Von Dudley) defeat Edge and Christian and T & A (Albert and Test). Edge and Christian first put Albert through a table with a double powerbomb. Christian was then put through a table via a 3-D.

The second match was for the WWF Women's Championship. Ivory successfully retained her title against Lita, when Lita went for a sunset flip, Ivory grabbed Steven Richards to block the move, which enabled her to roll up Lita for the win.

The next match was a hardcore match for the WWF Hardcore Championship. Steve Blackman retained the title when he kicked a chair into the face of the challenger Perry Saturn.

The WWF European Championship was next defended when William Regal took on Crash Holly. Regal pinned Holly for the win, however the referee reversed his decision when Molly Holly pointed out to him that Crash’s foot was on the bottom rope. While the referee was explaining to the ring announcer what happened, Crash used the opportunity to hit a drop kick on Regal and pick up the pinfall victory, and winning the title. Following the match, Regal grabbed the belt, attacked both Hollys and left with the title.

The next match saw Billy Gunn and Chyna defeat Dean Malenko and Eddie Guerrero. After Gunn cleared Guerrero from the ring, he hit the Cobra Clutch Slam on Malenko, and picked up the pinfall victory.

During the following match, Kane defeated Chris Jericho. After the match, while Kane was exiting, Jericho grabbed a chair and ran after Kane, attacking him with it. Jericho ultimately applied the Walls of Jericho on Kane while on the entrance ramp, before being broken up by referees.

The WWF Tag Team Championship was defended next when Right to Censor (Bull Buchanan and The Goodfather) defended their titles against The Hardy Boyz (Jeff Hardy and Matt Hardy).

The next match was scheduled to be The Undertaker taking on Chris Benoit; However prior to the match, Benoit, along with his other members of The Radicalz (Malenko, Saturn and Guerrero), attacked The Undertaker backstage. They twice played The Undertaker's music, but he was unable to come out. Tony Chimel then announced that should The Undertaker not come out, he would be forced to forfeit the match. The match ended when Benoit attempted to put a figure-4 on The Undertaker, however he countered with an inside cradle for the win.

The main event saw WWF Champion Kurt Angle defend his title in a Fatal-4-Way match against Rikishi, The Rock and "Stone Cold" Steve Austin. Austin and The Rock dominated Angle and Rikishi until the two men squared off. Austin hit a Stunner on Rock but Angle broke up the count. The Rock then executed a Rock Bottom on Austin but the members of the Radicalz as well as Edge and Christian interfered and attacked both Rock and Austin. Austin recovered early and hit a Stunner on Rikishi however he was attacked by the Radicalz, which allowed Angle to hit the Olympic Slam on Rikishi and retain the title. After the match, Austin and Rock fought off the Radicalz and taunted each other, before sharing beers and posing for the crowd as the show ended.

== Reception ==
In 2008, J.D. Dunn of 411Mania gave the event a rating of 7.0 [Good], writing, "Not a bad show at all. The undercard is filled with average-to-decent matches, and the uppercard features one of the few Benoit versus Undertaker matches as well as a fine four-way match. Thumbs up."

== Results ==
No.	Results	Stipulations	Times
1^{D}	Val Venis defeated Bradshaw	Singles match	—
2	The Dudley Boyz (Bubba Ray Dudley and D-Von Dudley) defeated Edge and Christian and T & A (Test and Albert) (with Trish Stratus)	Elimination tables match	9:55
3	Ivory (c) (with Steven Richards) defeated Lita	Singles match for the WWF Women's Championship	2:57
4	Steve Blackman (c) defeated Perry Saturn	Hardcore match for the WWF Hardcore Championship	6:02
5	Crash Holly (with Molly Holly) defeated William Regal (c)	Singles match for the WWF European Championship	4:59
6	Billy Gunn and Chyna defeated Dean Malenko and Eddie Guerrero	Tag team match	7:26
7	Kane defeated Chris Jericho	Singles match	8:06
8	Right to Censor (Bull Buchanan and The Goodfather) (c) (with Val Venis) defeated The Hardy Boyz (Matt Hardy and Jeff Hardy)	Tag team match for the WWF Tag Team Championship	8:08
9	The Undertaker defeated Chris Benoit	Singles match	12:18
10	Kurt Angle (c) defeated Rikishi, The Rock, and "Stone Cold" Steve Austin	Fatal 4-Way match for the WWF Championship	8:51
(c) / – the champion(s) heading into the match; D / – this was a dark match

== See also ==
- Professional wrestling in the United Kingdom
