= WWE Rebellion =

World Wrestling Entertainment pay-per-view event series

- WWE Rebellion 2002 logo
- Promotion: World Wrestling Entertainment
- Brand: SmackDown (2002)
- First event: 1999
- Last event: 2002

WWE Rebellion was an annual professional wrestling pay-per-view (PPV) event that was produced by World Wrestling Entertainment (WWE), an American professional wrestling promotion. Established in 1999, the events were held and broadcast exclusively in the United Kingdom. The first three events were held when the promotion was still called the World Wrestling Federation (WWF). Rebellion was also shown on the Viewers Choice service in Canada, but was never televised in the United States.

To coincide with the brand extension, the 2002 event was a SmackDown!-exclusive show, which was the promotion's first SmackDown!-exclusive PPV. Additionally, the 2002 event, which was the only held under the WWE name, was the final Rebellion PPV as United Kingdom-exclusive pay-per-views were discontinued in 2003 as WWE began to broadcast Raw and SmackDown! from the United Kingdom in 2004.

== History ==
In May 1999, the American professional wrestling promotion World Wrestling Federation (WWF, now WWE) held a pay-per-view called No Mercy, which was held in and broadcast exclusively for the United Kingdom. The promotion scheduled another United Kingdom-exclusive event to be held in October that year. It was titled Rebellion and was scheduled to be held on October 2, 1999, at the National Indoor Arena in Birmingham, England. The 2000 event thus established Rebellion as one of the WWF's annual United Kingdom-exclusive PPVs, the other being Insurrextion as No Mercy instead became an annual United States-based event.

The 2001 event took place during The Invasion period for the WWF, which ended at the next pay-per-view, Survivor Series. All matches had one member of the WWF taking on one member of The Alliance (composed of wrestlers originally from World Championship Wrestling and Extreme Championship Wrestling). Over the course of the evening, the WWF won six matches, while the Alliance won three.

In early 2002, the promotion introduced the brand extension, which divided its roster into two separate brands, Raw and SmackDown!, where wrestlers were exclusively assigned to perform. Shortly after this, the promotion itself was renamed to World Wrestling Entertainment (WWE). The 2002 event was in turn a SmackDown!-exclusive show and was WWE's first-ever SmackDown!-exclusive PPV held. It was also the last Rebellion event held as United Kingdom-exclusive PPVs were discontinued in 2003 as the company began to broadcast Raw and SmackDown from the United Kingdom in 2004.

== Events ==
SmackDown-branded event

#	Event	Date	City	Venue	Main event	Ref.
1	Rebellion (1999)	October 2, 1999	Birmingham, England	National Indoor Arena	Triple H (c) vs. The Rock in a Steel Cage match for the WWF Championship	
2	Rebellion (2000)	December 2, 2000	Sheffield, England	Sheffield Arena	Kurt Angle (c) vs. Rikishi vs. Stone Cold Steve Austin vs. The Rock in a Fatal Four-Way match for the WWF Championship	
3	Rebellion (2001)	November 3, 2001	Manchester, England	Manchester Arena	Stone Cold Steve Austin (c) vs. The Rock for the WWF Championship	
4	Rebellion (2002)	October 26, 2002	Manchester, England	Manchester Arena	Brock Lesnar (c) and Paul Heyman vs. Edge in a Handicap match for the WWE Championship	
(c) – refers to the champion(s) heading into the match

== See also ==
- Professional wrestling in the United Kingdom
