= House show =

Untelevised professional wrestling event

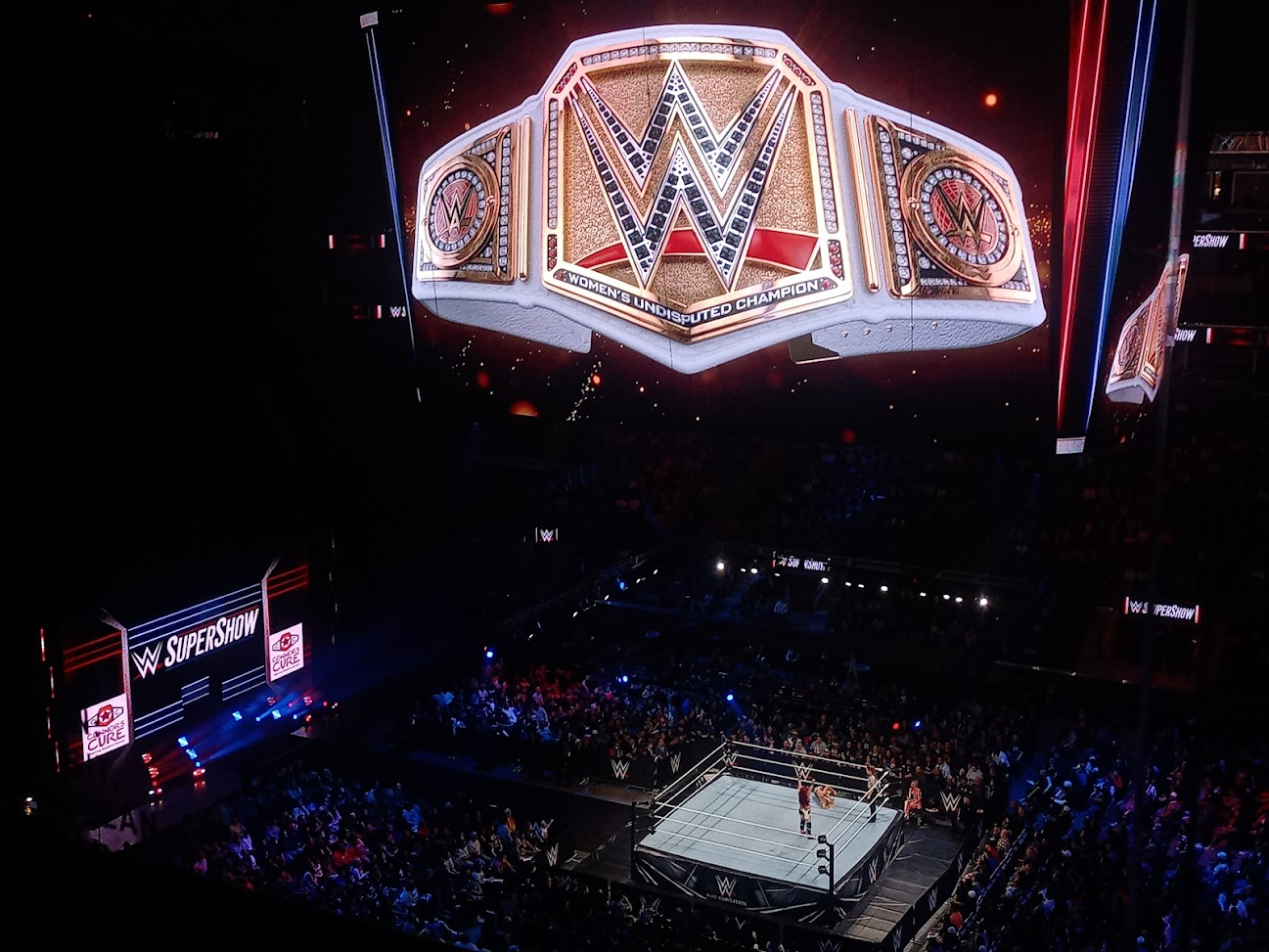
WWE Women's Championship match between Iyo Sky and Charlotte Flair at a WWE Live Event at Chase Center on September 30, 2023. House shows utilize a more scaled-down production than a televised show.

A house show (also commonly called a live event) is a professional wrestling event produced by a major promotion that is not televised, though they can be recorded.

House shows are also often scripted to make the face wrestlers win most matches, largely to send the crowd home happy. If a heel defends a title, the face may often win by disqualification, preventing the title from changing hands, which is a very rare occurrence in house show events.

Until the late-1980s, house shows were the main focus of most wrestling promotions, with televised programming primarily being used as buildup for these events. By the 1990s, promotions such as the WWF and WCW began to prioritize pay-per-view events and live weekly television programs, rendering house shows to be mostly minor events with no long-term story significance.

== Production ==
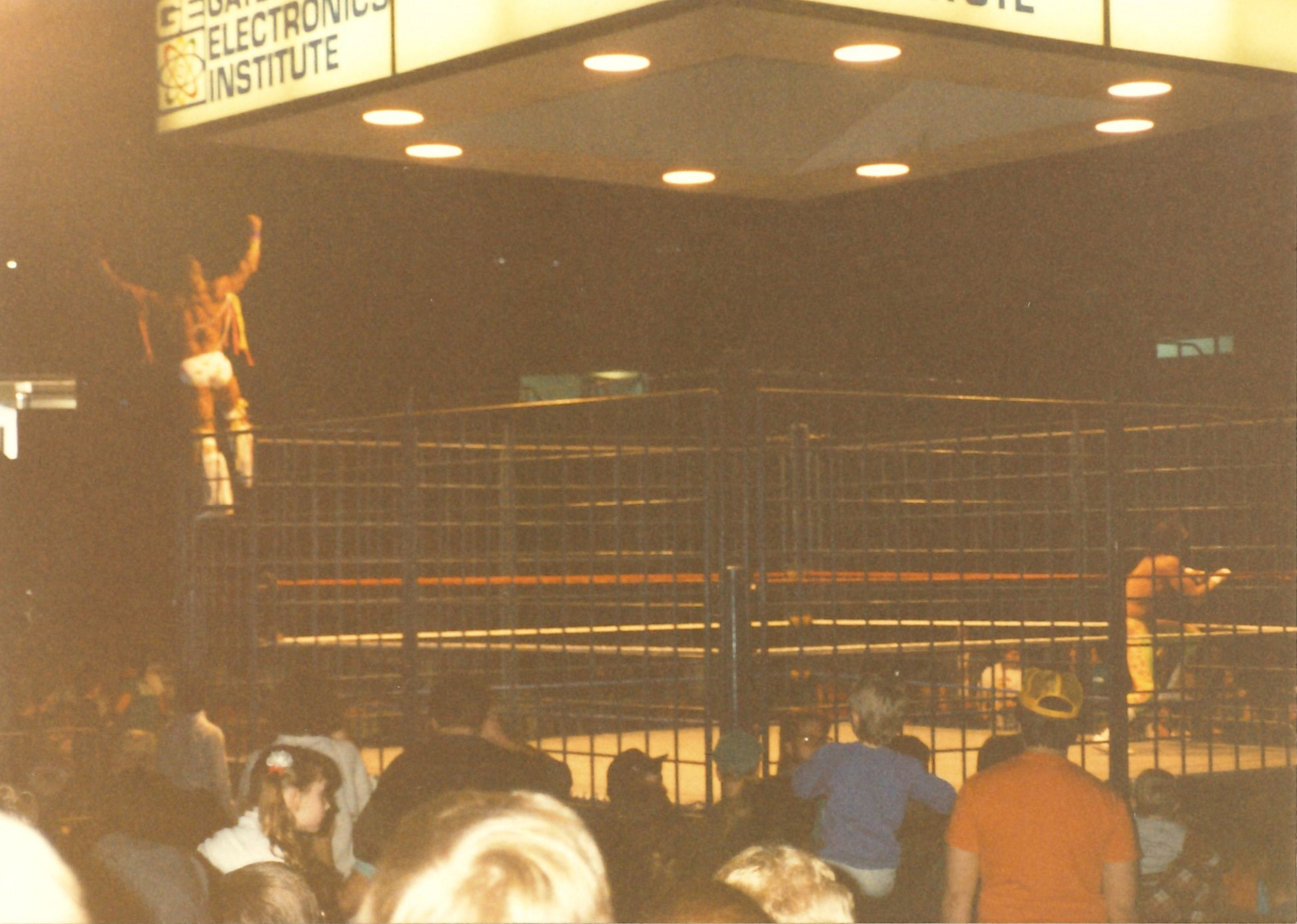
Randy Savage vs. Ultimate Warrior in a steel cage match at a WWF Live Event House Show in 1991

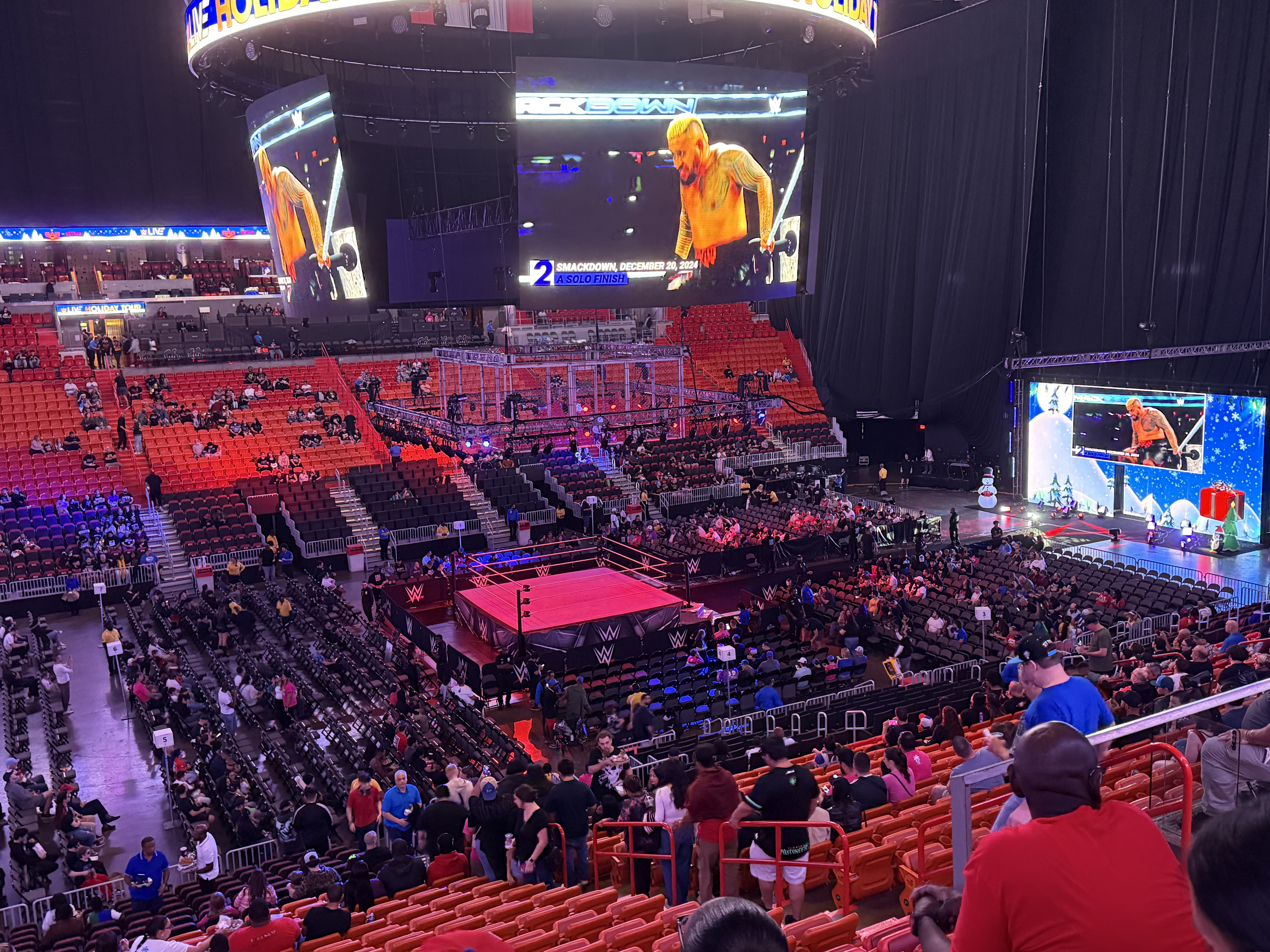
House Show in Miami, Florida.

Since house shows are not televised, promotions do not usually deploy the same setup for staging or pyrotechnics used for their television counterparts. In the past, a WWE house show would consist mainly of a ring, essential lighting, and a crowd. In late 2011, WWE invested US$1.5 million in production improvements, which included three LED-lit entrance stages (one each for Raw and SmackDown, and one backup) featuring a ramp and video display, and leveraging venues' existing AV equipment for multimedia such as entrances. As of 2021, a new stage was introduced that closer-resembles the stages used by televised shows at the time.

During the first brand extension, each WWE tour was exclusive to either the Raw or SmackDown brand. This remained the case through 2012, even after the first brand extension ended in 2011 on televised programming. In 2013, the shows were rebranded as "WWE Live", with NXT house shows subsequently branded as "NXT Live". After WrestleMania 38 in April 2022, WWE began to brand house shows held on weekends as "Saturday Night's Main Event" (reviving the branding of a then-former WWE television series) and "Sunday Night Stunner".

Because house shows are not televised, sometimes controversial things occur during them (although this is rare) which might not happen on a televised show. For example, on May 19, 1996, the MSG "Curtain Call", which was also a rare example of a shoot, occurred at a house show taped at Madison Square Garden. At the same show, The Bodydonnas lost their WWF Tag Team Championship to The Godwinns.

With the advent of WWE Network, WWE has televised portions of what are otherwise house shows as hour-long specials on the service, such as Starrcade—an event that shares the name with the flagship pay-per-view of the now-defunct WCW (whose assets were acquired by WWE), and The Shield's Final Chapter—a special which featured Dean Ambrose's final WWE appearance with his stable The Shield before his departure from the promotion.

Since 2020 and especially since WWE became a subsidiary of TKO Group Holdings in 2023, WWE has been gradually cutting back on house shows to focus on television tapings. While initially done out of necessity due to the COVID-19 pandemic, WWE's decision had more to do with cutting expenses as house shows don't make the company a lot of money, as well as to improve the work–life balance of its performers. One negative aspect is that ticket prices for its televised events has skyrocketed to make up some of the lost revenue from scaling back on house shows as well as increased demand for said tickets without house shows as an option. The reduction of house shows also eliminates many smaller markets who can't support a television taping from hosting any WWE events, forcing fans in those areas to drive a considerable distance to attend a TV taping.

Starting in March 2023, All Elite Wrestling launched a series of house shows under the "House Rules" brand.

== Title changes ==
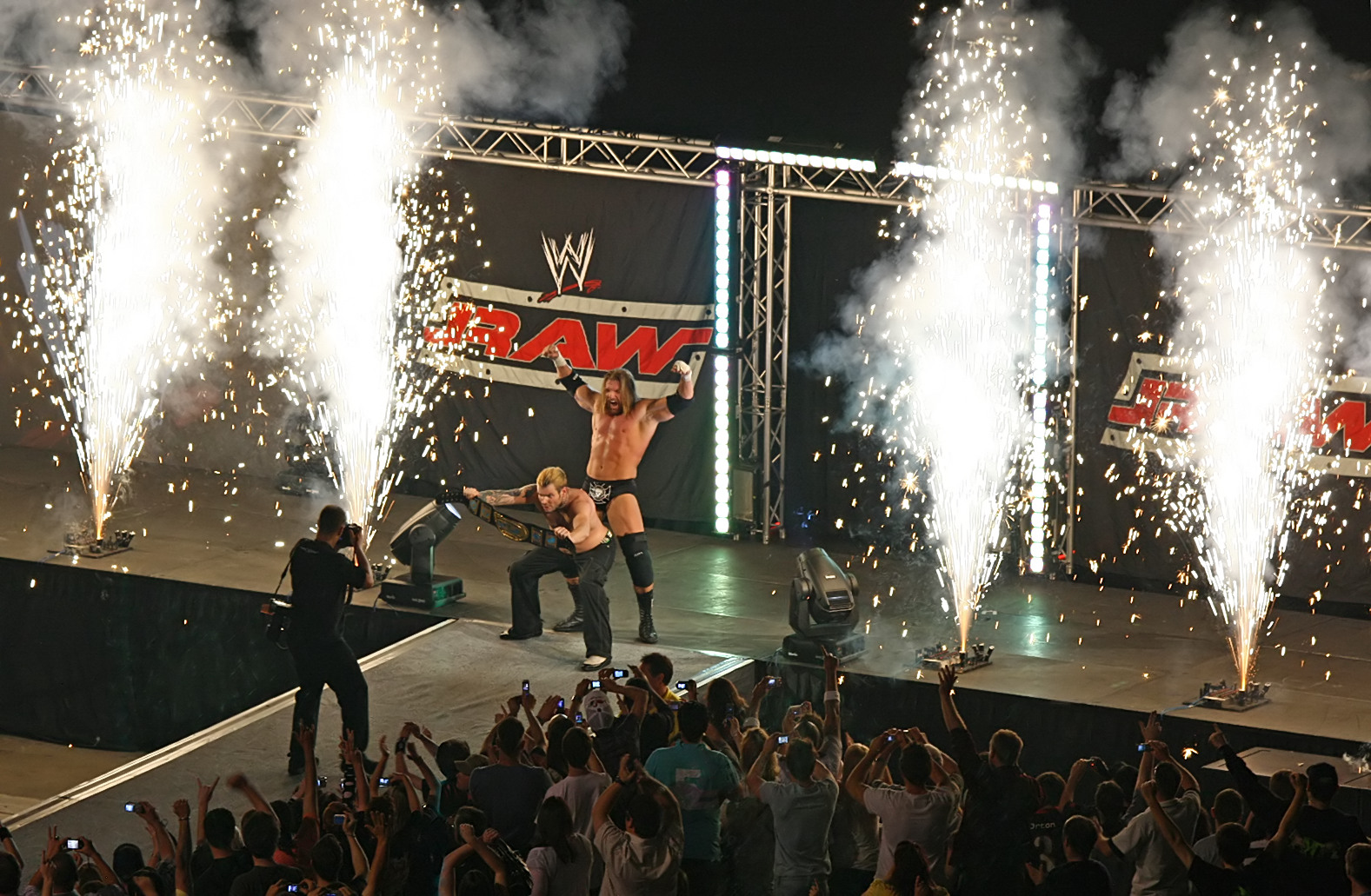
Jeff Hardy and Triple H pose amongst the pyrotechnics at a Raw house show in Australia.

Most major promotions try to develop their angles only during televised shows and will rarely book a major development (such as a title change) for house shows. House show title changes can occur both to gauge how fans would react to a certain outcome, and allow for outcomes that would appeal to local fans—such as Edge winning his first WWF Intercontinental Championship over Jeff Jarrett at a 1999 house show in Toronto.

If there is a title change, the title usually changes back during the same show or at another show on the loop before another televised event, like several titles changes of the WWE Hardcore Championship or when Booker T and Chris Benoit traded the WCW World Television Championship back-and-forth on several house shows, with Booker (the official champion) always having the title back in time for Nitro. Edge similarly lost the aforementioned Intercontinental Championship back to Jarrett at Fully Loaded the next evening in Buffalo.

There have also been occasions when title changes occur but are not recognized by the promotion. Some notable house show title changes include an August 10, 1987 match where The Rougeau Brothers (Raymond and Jacques) won over the champion Hart Foundation (Bret Hart and Jim Neidhart) to take the WWF Tag Team championship in the Rougeau's home town of Montreal. This change (and the eventual "decision reversal") was only ever mentioned during segments taped specifically for and shown in the Montreal market.

A fictional house show can be used to explain a sudden vacation or change of a title caused due to backstage issues on television. For example, on October 4, 1999 edition of WCW Monday Nitro, the commentators stated that Psychosis had defeated Lenny Lane for the WCW Cruiserweight Championship on an unspecified house show (thereby giving the title to Psychosis), after WCW management was forced to drop Lane's gimmick that was perceived as offensive by the GLAAD.

=== Notable title changes at house shows ===
On January 17, 1992 in Springfield, Massachusetts The Mountie defeated Bret Hart to become the new WWF Intercontinental Championship holder at a WWE Live house show event.

On October 12, 1992 Bret Hart defeated Ric Flair at a WWF house show in Canada to win the WWF Championship.

In Madison Square Garden “Diesel” Kevin Nash defeated Bob Backlund to win the WWF Championship at a WWF house show on November 29, 1994 .

Also the Original WWE Women's Championship has changed hands at WWE House shows multiple times by the lights of The Fabulous Moolah, Velvet McIntyre, Sensational Sherri and even by Mickie James and Melina Perez twice on the same night in April of 2007.

On January 15, 2012 Primo and Epico defeated Air Boom (Kofi Kingston and Evan Bourne) to win the WWE Tag Team Championship at a House Show in Oakland, California.

On April 21, 2016 in Lowell, Massachusetts at WWE Live Event House Show Samoa Joe defeated Finn Balor to win the NXT Championship.

On July 7, 2017 AJ Styles defeated Kevin Owens to win the WWE United States Championship in Madison Square Garden.

On September 12, 2026 the WWE Women's World Championship changed hands at WWE's Live House Show Event as Stephanie Vaquer defeated Liv Morgan to win the title in Santiago, Chile during WWE’s South American Live tour.

== As a metaphor ==
The phrase has been used to pejoratively describe WWE pay-per-views intended primarily for specific markets, including WWE's events in the UK (such as Insurrextion and Rebellion), and WWE's events in Saudi Arabia. In 2019, Shawn Michaels defended his one-off return at WWE's 2018 Crown Jewel pay-per-view in Saudi Arabia (reuniting D-Generation X to participate in a tag team match against The Brothers of Destruction) despite his retirement, describing the event as being a "glorified house show" that was not as important as WrestleMania or "coming back as the Heartbreak Kid".

== See also ==
- Glossary of professional wrestling terms
