= Rebellion (2002) =

World Wrestling Entertainment pay-per-view event

- DVD cover featuring Brock Lesnar
- Promotion: World Wrestling Entertainment
- Brand: SmackDown!
- Date: October 26, 2002
- City: Manchester, England
- Venue: Manchester Evening News Arena
- Attendance: 13,416

Pay-per-view chronology
← Previous; No Mercy	Next → Survivor Series

Rebellion chronology
← Previous; 2001	Next → Final

WWE in Europe chronology
← Previous; Insurrextion (2002)	Next → Insurrextion (2003)

The 2002 Rebellion was a professional wrestling pay-per-view (PPV) event produced by the American promotion World Wrestling Entertainment (WWE) and broadcast exclusively in the United Kingdom. It was the fourth annual and final Rebellion and took place on October 26, 2002, at the Manchester Arena in Manchester, England for a second consecutive year, held exclusively for wrestlers from the promotion's SmackDown! brand division.

This was WWE's first-ever SmackDown!-exclusive PPV, after the introduction of the brand extension earlier that year in March. It was also the only Rebellion held under the WWE name, after the promotion had been renamed from World Wrestling Federation (WWF) to WWE in May, as Rebellion was discontinued after this event due to the promotion's discontinuation of UK-exclusive PPVs in 2003.

== Production ==
=== Background ===
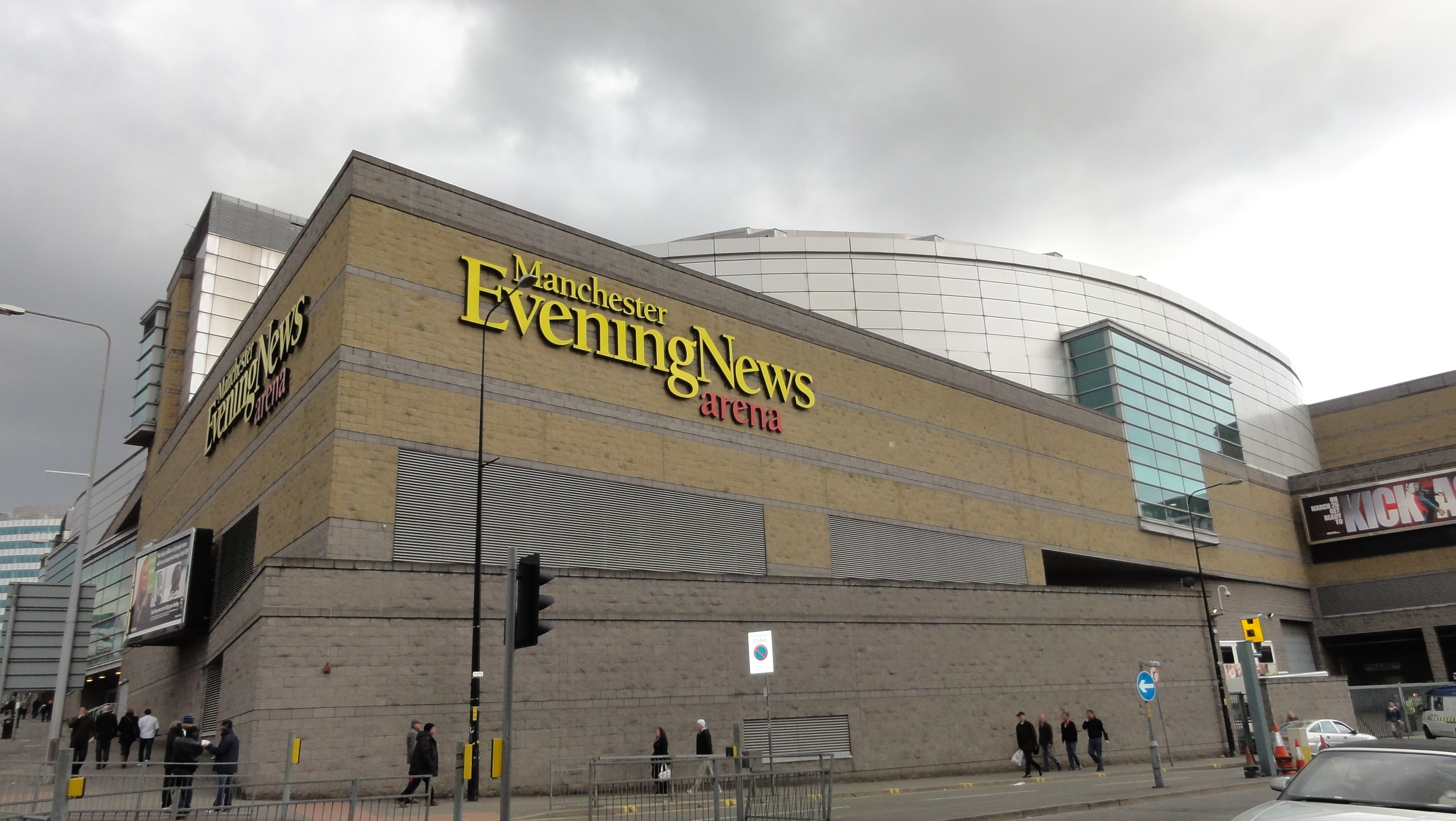
The event was held at the Manchester Evening News Arena in Manchester, England.

Rebellion was an annual professional wrestling pay-per-view (PPV) event produced by the American promotion World Wrestling Entertainment (WWE) since 1999 and broadcast exclusively in the United Kingdom. It was one of two annual UK-exclusive PPVs, along with Insurrextion. The fourth Rebellion event was scheduled to be held on October 26, 2002, at the Manchester Arena in Manchester, England for a second consecutive year.

This was the first Rebellion produced under the WWE name, as the company was renamed from World Wrestling Federation (WWF) to WWE in May earlier that year. It was also the first Rebellion produced under the brand extension that was introduced in March, which divided the roster into two separate brands, Raw and SmackDown!, where wrestlers were exclusively assigned to perform. The 2002 event was in turn held exclusively for wrestlers from the SmackDown! brand, which was the promotion's first-ever SmackDown!-exclusive PPV.

=== Storylines ===
The event featured nine professional wrestling matches and two pre-show matches that involved different wrestlers from pre-existing scripted feuds and storylines, predetermined by WWE's writers on the SmackDown! brand. Storylines were produced on WWE's weekly television show SmackDown!.

== Event ==
Other on-screen personnel
Role:	Name:
Commentators	Michael Cole
Commentators	Tazz
Interviewer	Mark Lloyd
Ring announcer	Tony Chimel
Referees	Mike Chioda
Referees	Mike Sparks
Referees	Brian Hebner
Referees	Jim Korderas

Prior to the start of the pay-per-view, Bill DeMott defeated Shannon Moore in a dark match.

=== Preliminary matches ===
The first match of the pay-per-view was scheduled to be The Undertaker facing Matt Hardy. However, SmackDown! General Manager Stephanie McMahon came out and revealed that The Undertaker was not at the event since his wife was expecting a baby. Stephanie then revealed that, as part of a trade to acquire Big Show, Raw's Booker T would substitute for The Undertaker for one night only. The match ended when Hardy went for the Twist of Fate, but Booker T reversed it and hit the scissors kick for the win. Following the match, Booker T performed the Spinaroonie before leaving the ring.

The next match was a mixed tag team match which saw John Cena and Dawn Marie face Billy Kidman and Torrie Wilson. After Cena hit Wilson with a bodyslam, Wilson responded by executing a low blow on Cena. Kidman performed the Shooting Star Press on Cena for the win.

The third match was between Funaki and Crash. When Crash went for the Oklahoma roll, Funaki blocked it and performed a roll-up to win the match.

Next was an elimination triple threat match for the WWE Cruiserweight Championship between Jamie Noble, Rey Mysterio and Tajiri. Noble first eliminated Tajiri after executing the Tiger Bomb. When Mysterio went for a victory roll, Noble grabbed Nidia outside the ring and pinned Mysterio to retain the title. After the match, Mysterio attacked Noble, knocking both him and Nidia down, followed by Mysterio hitting the 619 on both of them.

The next match saw Reverend D-Von and Ron Simmons face Chuck Palumbo and The Big Valbowski. D-Von grabbed Palumbo's tights and performed a roll-up to win the match.

The match that followed was a Kiss My Ass match between Rikishi and Albert. After Albert hit an exposed turnbuckle, Rikishi executed a Banzai Drop on Albert for the win. After the match, Albert refused to kiss Rikishi's ass, resulting in the referee threatening to suspend Albert if he did not. Albert attempted to hit Rikishi with a low blow, but Rikishi regained control and hit the Stink Face on Albert. Following the match, Tazz, Michael Cole and ring announcer Tony Chimel rejoined Rikishi in the ring to dance.

In the penultimate match, Chris Benoit and Kurt Angle defended the WWE Tag Team Championship against Los Guerreros (Eddie Guerrero and Chavo Guerrero). The match went back and forth as Benoit and Angle both delivered a series of suplexes to both Guerreros. As Angle prepared to execute the Olympic slam on Eddie, Eddie slipped off his shoulder and shoved Angle into Benoit, causing an argument between the two which knocked the referee down. Eddie applied the Lasso From El Paso on Angle, who countered with an ankle lock before Chavo hit Angle with the championship belt for a near-fall. After Benoit threw Eddie throat first onto the top rope, Angle executed the Olympic slam on Eddie for the win.

=== Main event match ===
The main event saw Brock Lesnar defend the WWE Championship against Edge in a handicap match, in which Lesnar teamed with Paul Heyman. The match was evenly controlled by Lesnar and Edge, while Heyman spent most of the match in the corner of the ring. In the end, when Edge attempted to come off the top rope, Lesnar hit Edge in the midsection with a steel chair and executed an F-5 to win the match and retain the title. After the match, Heyman attacked Edge with the chair, before Edge kicked the chair into Heyman's face and hit him with the Edgecution.

== Aftermath ==
The 2002 Rebellion would be the final Rebellion event, as WWE discontinued UK-exclusive PPVs after the 2003 Insurrextion PPV and the company began to broadcast Raw and SmackDown! from the UK in 2004.

== Results ==
No.	Results	Stipulations	Times
1^{D}	Bill DeMott defeated Shannon Moore	Singles match	8:26
2	Booker T defeated Matt Hardy	Singles match	12:00
3	Billy Kidman and Torrie Wilson defeated John Cena and Dawn Marie	Mixed tag team match	5:22
4	Funaki defeated Crash	Singles match	5:36
5	Jamie Noble (c) (with Nidia) defeated Rey Mysterio and Tajiri	Triple threat elimination match for the WWE Cruiserweight Championship	12:47
6	Reverend D-Von and Ron Simmons defeated Chuck Palumbo and The Big Valbowski	Tag team match	4:06
7	Rikishi defeated Albert	Kiss My Ass match	7:15
8	Chris Benoit and Kurt Angle (c) defeated Los Guerreros (Eddie and Chavo)	Tag team match for the WWE Tag Team Championship	16:35
9	Brock Lesnar (c) and Paul Heyman defeated Edge	Handicap match for the WWE Championship	18:50
(c) / – the champion(s) heading into the match; D / – this was a dark match

== See also ==
- Professional wrestling in the United Kingdom
