= Survivor Series (2001) =

World Wrestling Federation pay-per-view event

- Promotional poster featuring Lita and Torrie Wilson
- Promotion: World Wrestling Federation
- Date: November 18, 2001
- City: Greensboro, North Carolina
- Venue: Greensboro Coliseum
- Attendance: 13,142
- Buy rate: 450,000
- Tagline: "Winner Take All!"

Pay-per-view chronology
← Previous; Rebellion	Next → Vengeance

Survivor Series chronology
← Previous; 2000	Next → 2002

The 2001 Survivor Series was a professional wrestling pay-per-view (PPV) event produced by the World Wrestling Federation (WWF, now WWE). It was the 15th annual Survivor Series and took place on November 18, 2001, at the Greensboro Coliseum in Greensboro, North Carolina. The event centered on the Survivor Series match, a tag team elimination match that pits teams of multiple wrestlers against each other.

Eight matches were contested at the event. In the main event, Team WWF (The Rock, Chris Jericho, The Undertaker, Kane, and Big Show) defeated The Alliance ("Stone Cold" Steve Austin, Kurt Angle, Rob Van Dam, Booker T, and Shane McMahon) in a Winners Take All Survivor Series match where whichever team won gained full control over the WWF. In other prominent matches, WCW Tag Team Champions The Dudley Boyz (D-Von Dudley and Bubba Ray Dudley) defeated WWF Tag Team Champions The Hardy Boyz (Jeff Hardy and Matt Hardy) in a Steel Cage championship unification match, WCW United States Champion Edge defeated WWF Intercontinental Champion Test in a championship unification match, and in the opening bout, Christian defeated Al Snow to retain the WWF European Championship.

The event marked the end of The Invasion angle, which had dominated WWF storylines since March when Vince McMahon purchased World Championship Wrestling (WCW) and Extreme Championship Wrestling (ECW). It was the last Survivor Series held before the introduction of the brand extension in March 2002 and the last Survivor Series to be produced under the WWF name, as the company was renamed to World Wrestling Entertainment (WWE) in May 2002.

== Production ==
=== Background ===
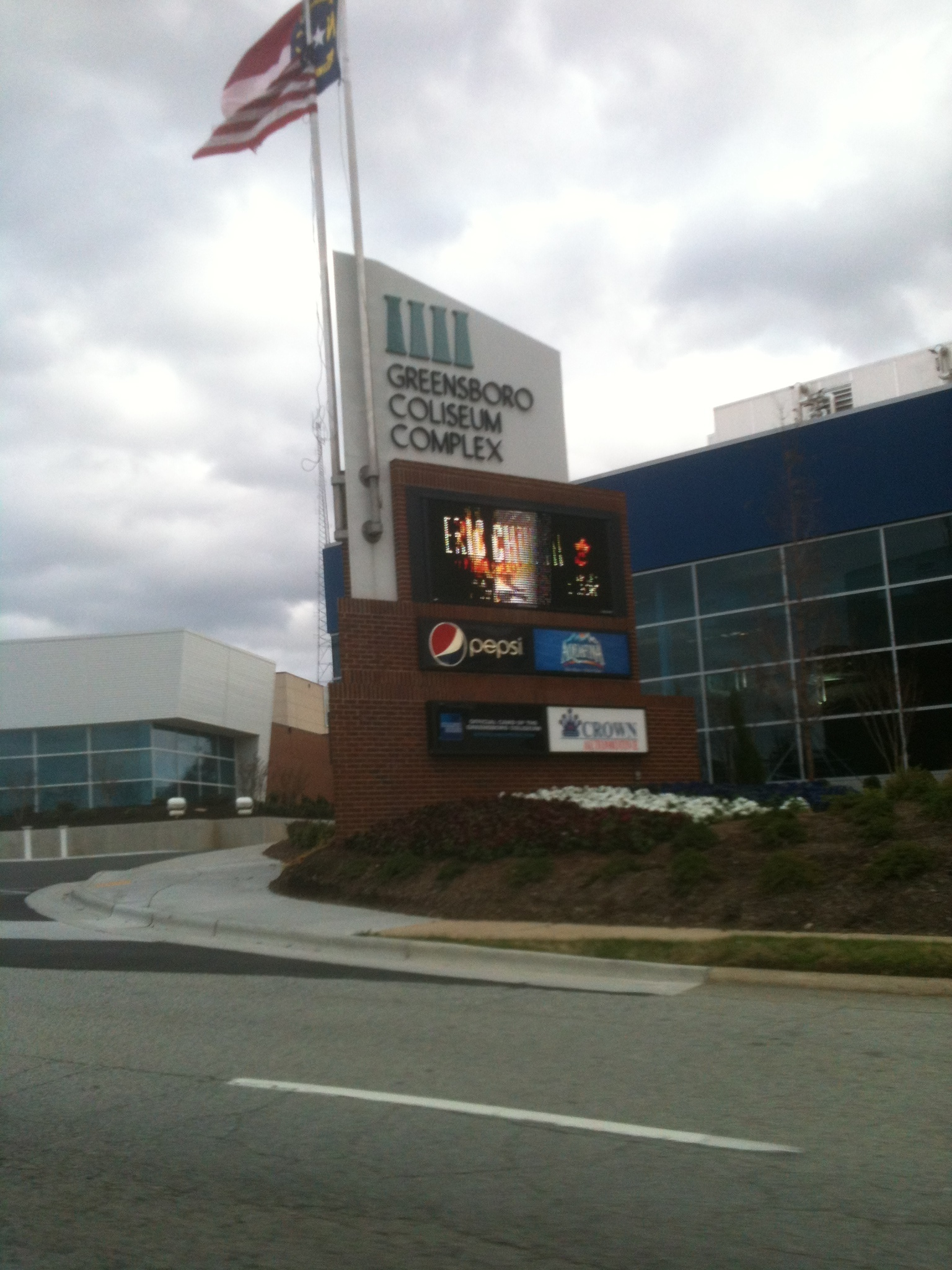
The event was held at the Greensboro Coliseum in Greensboro, North Carolina.

Survivor Series is an annual professional wrestling pay-per-view (PPV) event, produced every November by the World Wrestling Federation (WWF, now WWE) since 1987, generally held around Thanksgiving in the United States. In what has become the second longest-running pay-per-view event in history (behind WWE's WrestleMania), it is one of the promotion's original four pay-per-views, along with WrestleMania, SummerSlam, and Royal Rumble, referred to as the "Big Four", and was considered one of the "Big Five" PPVs with the addition of King of the Ring in 1993. The event is traditionally characterized by having Survivor Series matches, which are tag team elimination matches that typically pits teams of four or five wrestlers against each other. The 15th Survivor Series was scheduled to be held on November 18, 2001, at the Greensboro Coliseum Complex in Greensboro, North Carolina.

WWF Chief Executive Officer and Chairman Vince McMahon was originally supposed to be part of the main event, but was replaced by Big Show due to injury. In addition, a title unification match between WCW Cruiserweight Champion Tajiri and WWF Light Heavyweight Champion X-Pac was canceled because X-Pac was injured and unable to compete. To resolve this, the WWF retired the Light Heavyweight Championship shortly after Survivor Series in favor of the Cruiserweight Championship lineage, which was rebranded as a WWF title. The WWF European Championship match between Christian and Al Snow was neither announced nor built ahead of time, but was set up during a segment on the Sunday Night Heat program that aired before Survivor Series.

=== Storylines ===
The event featured eight professional wrestling matches with outcomes predetermined by WWF script writers. The matches featured wrestlers portraying their characters in planned storylines that took place before, during, and after the event. Storylines played out on the WWF's weekly television shows, Raw and SmackDown!.

The largest storyline that had pervaded the WWF in the preceding months was The Invasion, which came about due to the actual purchase of rival company World Championship Wrestling (WCW) by the WWF just prior to WrestleMania X-Seven. The storyline eventually grew into a WWF vs. WCW faction battle, and eventually Extreme Championship Wrestling (ECW) became a part of the battle by joining forces with WCW to create The Alliance.

On the October 22 episode of Raw, Vince and Linda McMahon challenged Shane and Stephanie McMahon to a "Winner Take All" match to determine the fate of both companies, with the winning side continuing to stay in business while the losing side would be absorbed into the winner's company. However, Vince McMahon had to deal with multiple defections to the Alliance side, including Kurt Angle, as well as an increasingly heated feud between two of the WWF's biggest stars, The Rock and Chris Jericho, over the WCW Championship. Vince began spreading rumors to The Alliance that there was a mole within their faction. Upon hearing this rumor, "Stone Cold" Steve Austin came to the ring and asked Vince who it was. When Vince claimed it was Austin, Austin replied with a Stone Cold Stunner on Vince, and Vince continued to smile as he lay in the ring. Vince's spreading of rumors of a mole threatened to splinter the Alliance team while Shane rallied the team together by saying there was no mole, and Vince was trying to split the Alliance team apart. Meanwhile, The Rock continued to be suspicious of Jericho, wondering if he was possibly going to betray Team WWF, given Jericho's history with both WCW and ECW, while Jericho continued to deny it. On an episode of SmackDown! before the Survivor Series, Austin was the last man standing after both factions attacked each other in the ring. After that, Vince appeared on the entrance ramp and shared a smile with Austin, teasing that Austin would be the mole.

== Event ==
Other on-screen personnel
Role:	Name:
English commentators	Jim Ross
English commentators	Paul Heyman
Spanish commentators	Carlos Cabrera
Spanish commentators	Hugo Savinovich
Backstage interviewers	Michael Cole
Backstage interviewers	Jonathan Coachman
Ring announcers	Howard Finkel
Referees	Mike Chioda
Referees	Charles Robinson
Referees	Nick Patrick
Referees	Jim Korderas
Referees	Earl Hebner
Referees	Tim White
Referees	Jack Doan
Referees	Mike Sparks

Before the event began, a dark match took place on Heat in which Lance Storm, Justin Credible, and Raven defeated Albert, Scotty 2 Hotty, and Spike Dudley.

=== Preliminary matches ===
The event opened with Christian defending the WWF European Championship against Al Snow, Snow performed the Snow-Plow on Christian for a near-fall. After Snow chased Christian, Christian kicked the middle rope into Snow. Christian performed the Unprettier on Snow to retain the title.

Next, William Regal faced Tajiri. Regal performed a Regal Bomb on Tajiri to win the match.

After that, WCW United States Champion Edge faced WWF Intercontinental Champion Test in a title unification match. Test performed a Pumphandle Slam on Edge for a near-fall. Edge performed a Spear on Test for a near-fall. Test attempted a Full Nelson Slam on Edge but Edge countered the move into a Roll Up to win the match.

Later, WCW Tag Team Champions The Dudley Boyz (Bubba Ray Dudley and D-Von Dudley) faced WWF Tag Team Champions The Hardy Boyz (Matt Hardy and Jeff Hardy) in a Steel Cage match to unify the titles. Stacy Keibler stole the cage door key off a referee and passed Bubba and D-Von a table. Matt prevented a 3D and escaped the cage. Jeff attempted a Swanton Bomb off the top of the cage through the table on D-Von but D-Von avoided the move, causing Jeff to fall through the table. Bubba pinned Jeff to win the match.

Next was an Immunity Battle Royal featuring members of both factions. The winner of the match would be protected from being fired for one year regardless of whether the WWF or Alliance won in the main event. Shawn Stasiak was eliminated by The APA before the bell rang. Tazz, Hugh Morrus and Chavo Guerrero entered the match at various points of the match. Test won the match by last eliminating Billy Gunn.

After that, Trish Stratus, Lita, Jacqueline, Mighty Molly, Jazz and Ivory wrestled in a 6-Pack Challenge for the vacant WWF Women's Championship. Trish performed the Stratusfaction on Ivory to win the title.

=== Main event ===
In the main event, Team WWF (The Rock, Chris Jericho, The Undertaker, Kane, and Big Show) faced The Alliance ("Stone Cold" Steve Austin, Rob Van Dam, Kurt Angle, Booker T, and Shane McMahon) in a winner take all 5-on-5 Survivor Series elimination match. Big Show was eliminated by McMahon after a Leap of Faith. McMahon was eliminated by Jericho after a Lionsault. Kane was eliminated by Van Dam after a Diving Thrust Kick. The Undertaker was eliminated by Angle after Austin performed a Stone Cold Stunner on The Undertaker and placed Angle on top of him. Booker T was eliminated by The Rock with a Roll Up. Van Dam was eliminated by Jericho after a Breakdown. Angle was eliminated after The Rock forced Angle to submit to the Sharpshooter. Jericho was eliminated by Austin with a Roll Up. Jericho attacked The Rock with a Breakdown and Austin pinned The Rock for a near-fall. Jericho shocked couldn't believe it, he wanted to give more to The Rock, but he was stopped by The Undertaker who he confronted and take Jericho out of the stage. Austin applied the Sharpshooter on The Rock but The Rock touched the ring ropes, forcing Austin to break the hold. The Rock applied the Sharpshooter on Austin but Austin touched the ring ropes, forcing The Rock to break the hold. The Rock performed a Stone Cold Stunner on Austin but Nick Patrick pulled Earl Hebner out of the ring, voiding the pinfall. Austin performed a Rock Bottom on The Rock for a near-fall. Austin attacked Patrick and checked on Hebner but The Rock pushed Austin into Hebner after an attempted Stunner from Austin. The Rock attempted a Rock Bottom on Austin but Austin reversed it and performed a Stone Cold Stunner on The Rock, but no referee was there to make the count when Austin covered him. While Austin tried to revive Hebner, Angle returned and hit Austin with the WWF Championship belt. The Rock performed a Rock Bottom on Austin to win the match, putting the Alliance out of business. After the match, Vince McMahon appeared on the entrance ramp and celebrated with The Rock.

== Reception ==
In 2008, J.D. Dunn of 411Mania gave the event a rating of 7.5 [Good], writing, "The actual survival match at the end is pretty good, but it's just more Rock/Austin, something that would have happened had the WCW buyout never occurred. Everything else was somewhere in the middle. The Hardyz and Dudleyz was played out, but at least it was a catalyst for the teased breakup of the Hardyz a few weeks later. With everyone else, it became a game of "how do we put this person over without actually putting them over anyone else?" That's why most of the midcard wound up treading water until the brand extension. I'll call this a recommended show for the main event and for historical reasons -- just not the ones the WWF was hoping for".

== Aftermath ==
The next night on Raw, Vince McMahon announced that the WCW Championship held by The Rock had become unbranded due to the dissolution of the Alliance and would be referred to simply as the World Championship. Several Alliance members were allowed to keep their jobs. Christian, The Dudley Boyz, and Rob Van Dam were all holding championships following the Alliance's loss (Christian was the WWF European Champion, the Dudley Boyz were the undisputed WWF Tag Team Champions, and Van Dam was the WWF Hardcore Champion). In addition, Stacy Keibler was able to stay employed due to her status as the valet for the Dudley Boyz and Test was able to after winning the Immunity Battle Royal. McMahon also debuted the infamous "Kiss My Ass Club" that night, where he said that an Alliance member—in this case, Alliance Commissioner William Regal—would have to literally kiss his ass to keep his job.

At the very top of the show, Paul Heyman was the first Alliance member fired. Furious over being fired, Heyman lunged at his now-former broadcast partner Jim Ross. The audience delighted in seeing Ross pummel Heyman before he was carted off by security. To replace him, Jerry Lawler was brought back, making his first appearance since his resignation from the company in the end of February after No Way Out. The Alliance co-owners, Shane and Stephanie McMahon, were called to the ring to answer for what they did. While Shane accepted his defeat and walked away, Stephanie tried to plead for her job, but was escorted from the ring by WWF security per orders by the WWF chairman Vince McMahon.

Based on his actions at the end of the WWF vs. Alliance Survivor Series match, for the majority of Raw Kurt Angle went around the backstage area portraying himself as the man who saved the WWF and wanting to be praised for doing so. Instead of that, Angle drew the ire of several WWF superstars including The Rock, who defeated him later that night in a successful defense of his World Championship. After the match Chris Jericho, who had been feuding with The Rock in the weeks leading up to Survivor Series over the newly rechristened World Championship, attacked him to reignite their feud.

Despite his self-congratulating attitude, no one found Angle to be the conquering hero he was portraying himself as and by the end of Raw he was depressed and told Vince McMahon that no one appreciated him. McMahon agreed with Angle and looked for a way to reward him.

That reward came in the ring moments later, as McMahon was about to announce the stripping of the WWF Championship from "Stone Cold" Steve Austin, who had not yet appeared on the show. McMahon's intent was to award it to Kurt Angle as a token of his appreciation for Angle's actions at Survivor Series. However, before he could do so he was interrupted by Ric Flair, who returned to a WWF ring for the first time since January 1993. Flair then happily told McMahon that he "had bet on a winner last night," and said to a surprised McMahon that when Shane and Stephanie sold their stock in the WWF to purchase WCW and ECW, he was the consortium who had bought the stock, and as such, he was co-owner of the WWF and he and McMahon were now partners.

Austin then angrily returned, promptly going to the ring and attacking Angle, and then McMahon when he tried to intervene, while Flair idly stood by. Austin then became a face for the first time since WrestleMania X-Seven, when he reclaimed his WWF Championship, and celebrated with beers with Flair in the ring.

Over the coming weeks the WWF decided what to do with the world championship situation, as there were now two world championships in the company. A tournament at Vengeance was conceived, where Austin and Angle would face each other for the WWF Championship and The Rock and Jericho would face each other for the World Championship. After those two matches, the winners would face off in one final match to unify both championships. Austin defeated Angle to retain the WWF Championship while Jericho defeated The Rock to win the World Championship. In the finals Jericho defeated Austin due to outside interference from Booker T to become the first ever Undisputed WWF Champion. As a measure of payback, Austin would go on to beat up Booker T in a supermarket on an episode of SmackDown!. followed by a Bingo game at a Church during an episode of Raw after Booker T smashed the windows of Austin's Pickup truck.

This was the last Survivor Series to be held before the introduction of the first brand extension in March 2002, which split the roster into two distinct brands, Raw and SmackDown!, where wrestlers were exclusively assigned to perform. It was also the last Survivor Series under the WWF name, as the promotion was renamed to World Wrestling Entertainment (WWE) in May 2002.

== Results ==
No.	Results	Stipulations	Times
1^{H}	Justin Credible, Lance Storm, and Raven (Alliance) defeated Albert, Scotty 2 Hotty, and Spike Dudley (WWF) by pinfall	Six-man tag team match	5:20
2	Christian (c) (Alliance) defeated Al Snow (WWF) by pinfall	Singles match for the WWF European Championship	6:30
3	William Regal (Alliance) defeated Tajiri (WWF) by pinfall	Singles match	2:59
4	Edge (c - U.S.) (WWF) defeated Test (c - Intercontinental) (Alliance)	Unification match for the WCW United States Championship and WWF Intercontinental Championship	11:19
5	The Dudley Boyz (D-Von Dudley and Bubba Ray Dudley) (c - WCW) (with Stacy Keibler) (Alliance) defeated The Hardy Boyz (Jeff Hardy and Matt Hardy) (c - WWF) (WWF) by pinfall	Tag team Steel Cage Unification match for the WCW Tag Team Championship and WWF Tag Team Championship	15:44
6	Test (Alliance) won by last eliminating Billy Gunn (WWF) (Note: The other participants were Bradshaw (WWF), Faarooq (WWF), Lance Storm (Alliance), Billy Kidman (Alliance), Diamond Dallas Page (Alliance), Albert (WWF), Tazz, Perry Saturn (WWF), Raven (Alliance), Chuck Palumbo (WWF), Crash Holly (WWF), Justin Credible (Alliance), Shawn Stasiak (Alliance), Steven Richards (Alliance), Tommy Dreamer (Alliance), The Hurricane (Alliance), Spike Dudley (WWF), Hugh Morrus, Chavo Guerrero, and Funaki (WWF). Tazz, Morrus, and Guerrero entered the match after it had begun, although they all departed from the Alliance at different points in the week prior to Survivor Series; thus, they were referred to as "wild cards" by the commentators at the event.)	Immunity Battle Royal	7:37
7	Trish Stratus (WWF) defeated Ivory (Alliance), Jazz (Alliance), Jacqueline (WWF), Lita (WWF) and Mighty Molly (Alliance) by pinfall	Six-Pack Challenge for the vacant WWF Women's Championship	4:23
8	Team WWF (The Rock, Chris Jericho, The Undertaker, Kane, and Big Show) defeated The Alliance ("Stone Cold" Steve Austin, Kurt Angle, Rob Van Dam, Booker T, and Shane McMahon)	Winners Take All 5-on-5 Survivor Series match Since Team WWF won, Vince McMahon and Linda McMahon remained in full control of the World Wrestling Federation. Had The Alliance won, Shane McMahon and Stephanie McMahon would have gained full control of the company.	44:47
(c) / – the champion(s) heading into the match; H / – the match was broadcast prior to the pay-per-view on Sunday Night Heat

=== Survivor Series match ===
Eliminated	Wrestler	Eliminated by	Team	Method	Time
1	Big Show	Shane McMahon	Team WWF	Pinfall	12:42
2	Shane McMahon	Chris Jericho	The Alliance	Pinfall	14:30
3	Kane	Rob Van Dam	Team WWF	Pinfall	18:56
4	The Undertaker	Kurt Angle	Team WWF	Pinfall	20:03
5	Booker T	The Rock	The Alliance	Pinfall	22:33
6	Rob Van Dam	Chris Jericho	The Alliance	Pinfall	25:48
7	Kurt Angle	The Rock	The Alliance	Submission	32:22
8	Chris Jericho	"Stone Cold" Steve Austin	Team WWF	Pinfall	34:50
9	"Stone Cold" Steve Austin	The Rock	The Alliance	Pinfall	44:57
Sole Survivor:	The Rock (Team WWF)				
