= Tony Chimel =

American professional wrestling ring announcer

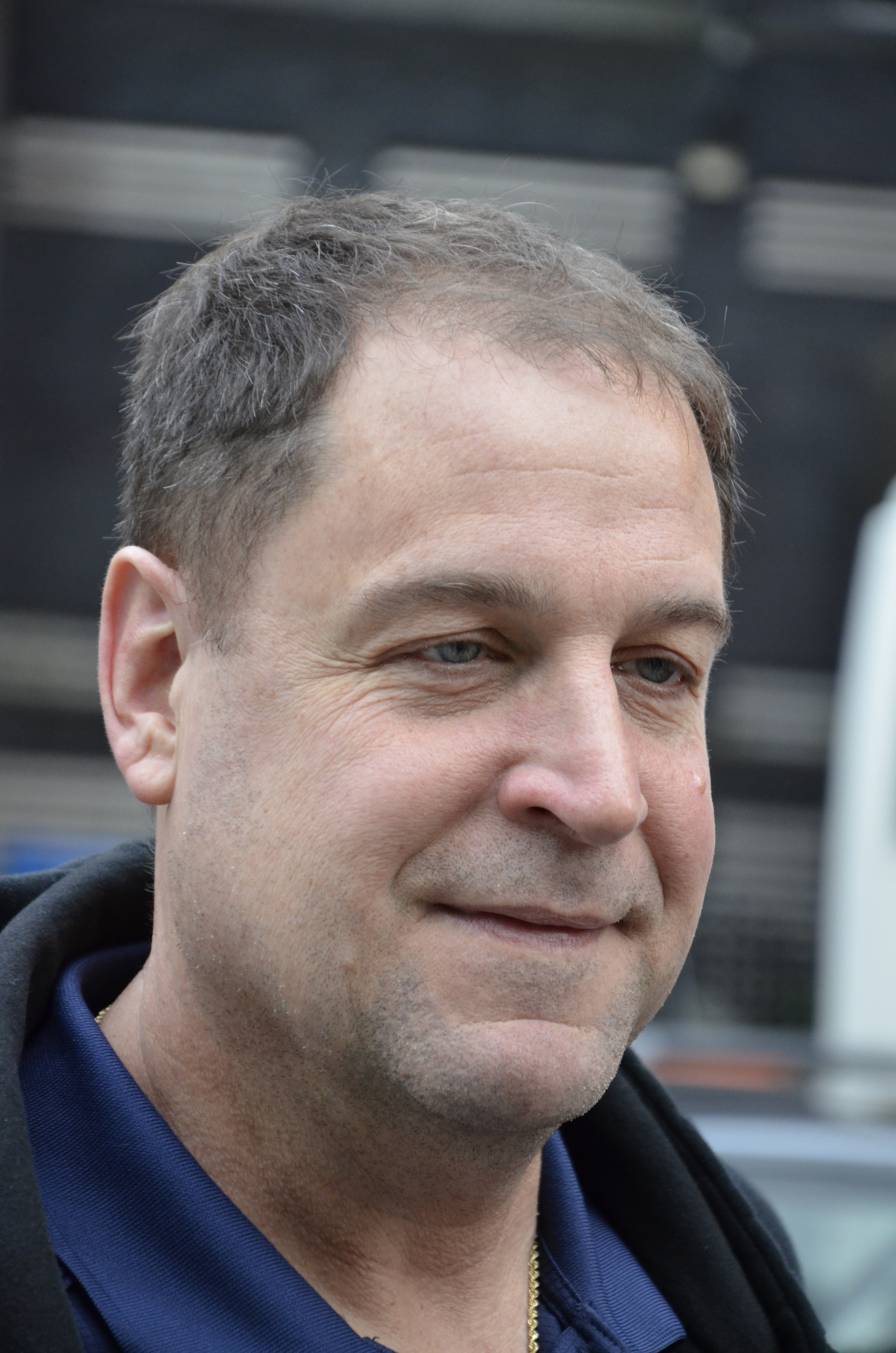
- Chimel in 2013

Personal information
- Born: August 18, 1961 (age 65) Texas, U.S.
- Children: 1

Professional wrestling career
- Ring name(s): Tony Chimel; Tony Chimmel
- Billed height: 6 ft 1 in (1.85 m)
- Billed from: Willingboro Township, New Jersey
- Debut: 1983

Tony Chimel (born August 18, 1961) is an American former professional wrestling ring announcer. He is best known for his time with WWE, where he worked from 1983 until 2020. From 2023 to 2025, he worked for All Elite Wrestling (AEW) as a producer.

== Announcing career ==
=== World Wrestling Federation / Entertainment / WWE ===
==== Early years (1983–1999) ====
Before Chimel become a ring announcer, he and Joey Marella were the main ring technicians for the WWE. Chimel then began announcing duties for the company in 1989, working mostly televised B-Shows or non-televised house shows and filling in for Howard Finkel whenever necessary, including appearances on Raw.

==== SmackDown! (1999–2007) ====
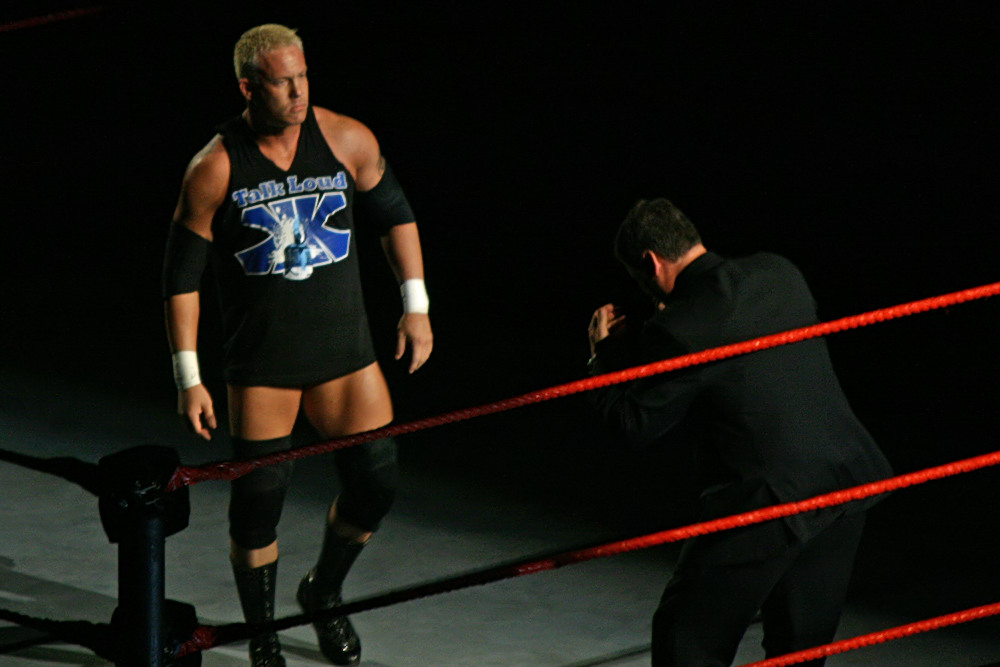
Mr. Kennedy in October 2007 during his feud with Chimel

Chimel was the SmackDown! ring announcer from its inception in 1999. He was also the ring announcer at SmackDown brand pay-per-views from 2002 to 2007. He defeated Howard Finkel for the rights to be SmackDown! announcer in 1999 in a tuxedo match.

On Kurt Angle's final episode as SmackDown! General Manager in 2004, he demanded Chimel to come into the ring and give an apology to him; Chimel complied but then was fired by Angle. He was almost immediately re-hired by Vince McMahon.

From 2005 to 2007 Chimel was involved in a mini-feud with Mr. Kennedy, who claimed that Chimel was not announcing his name with the proper respect that it deserved. This feud included Chimel being punched, being hit in the groin, and having a doughnut shoved in his mouth by Kennedy.

On the December 22, 2006 episode of SmackDown!, he announced The Boogeyman as victorious too enthusiastically and caught his attention. The Boogeyman forced worms into his mouth as a result. Chimel ran away from the ring afterwards. This was a storyline for Chimel to take some time off to rest his nagging back injury and spend more time with his family. ECW announcer Justin Roberts was the ring announcer of SmackDown until Chimel returned on April 13, 2007.

==== Various brand switches (2007–2015) ====
In 2007, Chimel swapped ring announcing duties with Justin Roberts, becoming the ring announcer for the ECW brand. Chimel began announcing on WWE Superstars, and made his first appearance on the April 30, 2009 episode. After Justin Roberts left SmackDown to become the new ring announcer for the Raw brand, Chimel left ECW and returned to SmackDown for his second stint as ring announcer. He then became the announcer of the ECW brand when the last ECW announcer, Lauren Mayhew, quickly left the WWE, before returning to SmackDown.

During this time, Chimel began to gain a reputation for his announcements for Edge, who had recently dubbed himself "The Rated-R Superstar". During these announcements, Chimel's voice would frequently crack while saying the word "superstar". This would become something of a running joke on WWE television, leading to Chimel making guest appearances solely to announce Edge.

He was demoted from SmackDown when former Raw announcer Lilian Garcia returned to the WWE in December 2011. At the December 27 taping of SmackDown, NXT, & Superstars, it was revealed that Chimel would be announcing for NXT and the SmackDown portion of Superstars, replacing the departing Eden Stiles. Chimel announced for NXT until the end of the final season of its original run.

He was the ring announcer for Main Event as well as for WWE live events until June 24, 2014, and he was the ring announcer for the short-lived Saturday Morning Slam. He briefly returned to Raw on September 9, 2013, and SmackDown on September 13, 2013, to announce the returning Edge to the ring. On November 16, 2013 at a WWE live event in the United Kingdom, Chimel delivered a stunner to Curtis Axel after Axel forced Chimel to announce that Axel was still the Intercontinental Champion following Axel's win over R-Truth. Afterward, Chimel was kissed by one of the Bella Twins. On the May 14, 2014 episode of Main Event, He was destroyed by Alicia Fox during her meltdown after she lost to Emma. On the December 29 episode of Raw, Chimel returned to announce Edge and Christian. He would also announce their appearances on the December 30 episode of Main Event and the January 2, 2015 episode of SmackDown.

==== Sporadic appearances and departure (2015–2020) ====
Chimel later took a hiatus from announcing with WWE. During the hiatus, he announced at house shows only.

Chimel returned to WWE television on the December 28, 2015 edition of Raw. He would return in February 2016 at Fastlane to introduce Edge and Christian. Chimel had since been reserved, only to introduce Edge whenever he appeared on television.

Chimel once again returned to WWE television on November 15, 2016, during the 900th episode of SmackDown. At this appearance, he did his trademark introduction of Edge, before the Cutting Edge segment. Chimel returned during Beth Phoenix's induction in the 2017 WWE Hall of Fame to announce her husband Edge's name.

Chimel worked primarily behind the scenes for WWE in his last years with the company, working as a production manager and part of the ring crew. It was announced on November 9, 2020 that Chimel was released from his WWE contract on November 6, 2020 after being furloughed from the company since April 2020, effectively ending his 37-year tenure there.

=== All Elite Wrestling (2023–2025) ===
Chimel worked for All Elite Wrestling (AEW) as producer from April 2023 until November 2025.

== Post-career ==
Following his release from the WWE, Chimel took a job at a Trader Joe's store.

== Other media ==
Chimel appears in the video games WWE Day of Reckoning 2, WWE SmackDown! vs. Raw 2006, WWE Smackdown vs. Raw 2007, WWE SmackDown vs. Raw 2008, WWE Smackdown vs. Raw 2009, WWE Smackdown vs. Raw 2010, WWE Smackdown vs. Raw 2011, WWE '12, WWE Wrestlefest, WWE '13, WWE 2K15 as part of the One More Match & The Hall of Pain DLC packs, and WWE 2K16 for SmackDown! in the 3:16 Showcase.
