= La Familia (professional wrestling) =

Professional wrestling stable

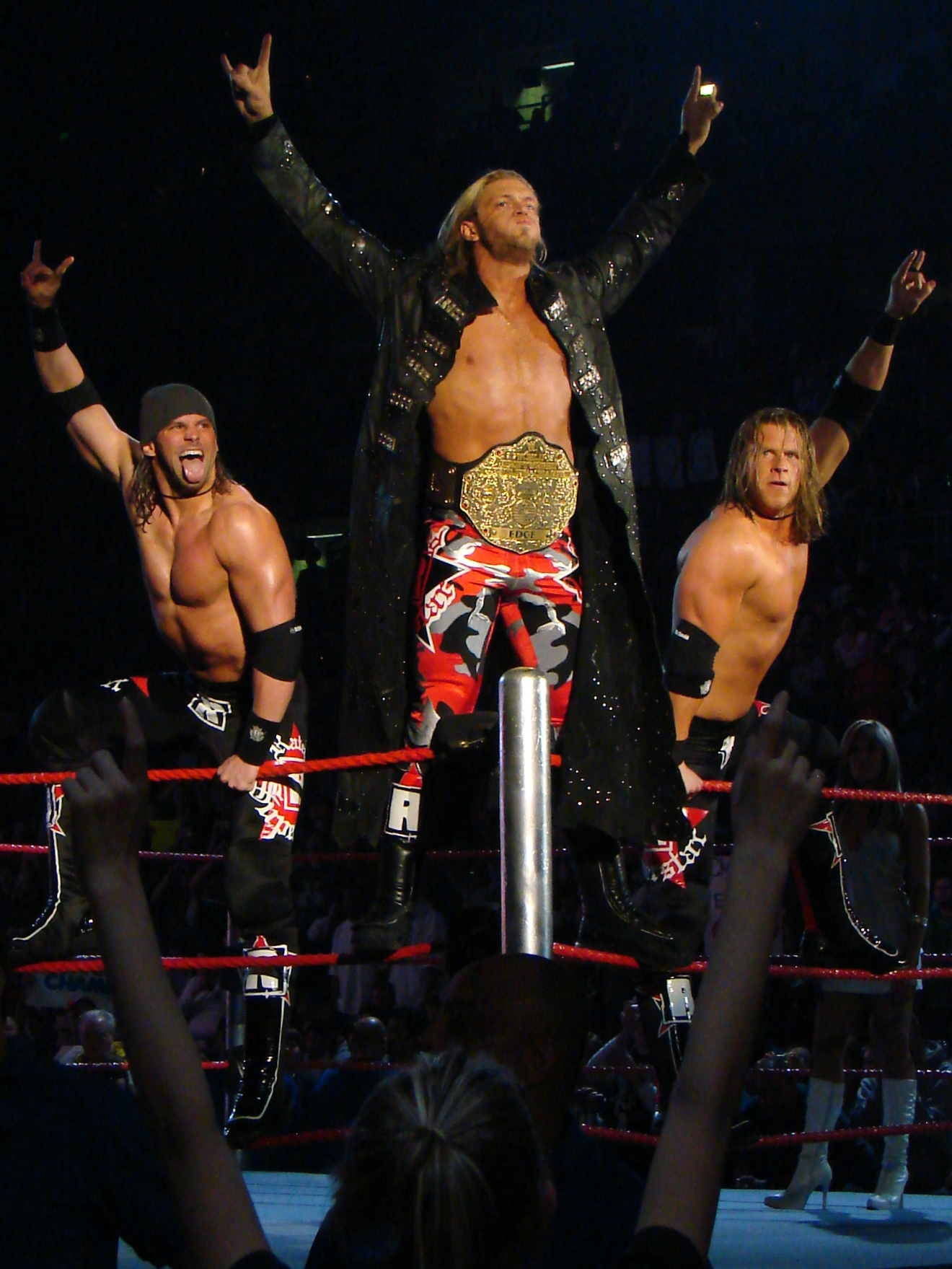
- From left to right: Zack Ryder, Edge, and Curt Hawkins made up one half of La Familia

Stable
- Leader: Edge
- Members: Vickie Guerrero; Chavo Guerrero; Curt Hawkins; Zack Ryder; Bam Neely
- Debut: November 18, 2007
- Disbanded: June 8, 2009
- Years active: 2007–2009

La Familia was a villainous professional wrestling stable in the professional wrestling promotion World Wrestling Entertainment (WWE) that existed from November 18, 2007 until June 8, 2009. The group consisted of Edge, Vickie Guerrero, Chavo Guerrero, Curt Hawkins, Zack Ryder, and Bam Neely. The team went on to have control over several championships and authority positions on WWE as they appeared on all three WWE brands, starting on SmackDown, and later spreading over to ECW and Raw.

== Concept ==
The idea behind the group was the concept of family. This specifically pertained to Vickie and Chavo both being members of Los Guerreros, the Guerrero wrestling family, with Chavo being Vickie's nephew by way of her marriage to the deceased wrestler Eddie Guerrero. Through his on-screen romantic (and later marital) relationship with her, Edge became part of the family and the group largely revolved around protecting his interests although they would often help out other members as well. The name of the group conveys the Mexican heritage of the Guerreros, giving a Spanish inflection on the word family.

While the group consisted of six members, Vickie and Edge were the central focus and were known for their grotesquely hyperbolised displays of affection, such as primal kisses. As well as frequently kissing on screen, the couple often showed video packages of them in comically blissful situations such as playing on swings and feeding each other while having a picnic. As well as these romantic scenes, the pair would often be shown indulging activities unrelated to wrestling, such as having a pedicure and other beauty treatments. Also, despite not being a wrestler, Vickie Guerrero played a central role in the group not only in aiding Edge's career, but also earning the ire of many wrestlers which resulted in her frequently being attacked and consequently appearing in a wheelchair or wearing a neck brace, which became somewhat iconic for Vickie at the time. She also became notorious for her screeching and for shouting "Excuse me!" to gain the attention of booing fans, all started during her tumultuous affair with Edge.

While the group were notorious villains in kayfabe, the members received praise from wrestling fans for their performances. Edge was noted for his ability to indulge in comically entertaining scenes without losing his potency as a convincingly detestable character.

== History ==
=== World Wrestling Entertainment (2007–2009) ===
==== Formation ====
Edge relinquished the World Heavyweight Championship in July 2007 due to injury. He returned four months later at Survivor Series, where he attacked The Undertaker during a Hell in a Cell match and helped Batista retain the championship. On the November 23 weekly episode of SmackDown!, it was revealed that Edge was romantically involved as part of the storyline with the show's general manager Vickie Guerrero, who granted Edge a championship match against Batista on the following week. Although Edge lost that match, he would win the championship at Armageddon from Batista in a triple-threat match also involving The Undertaker, with the help of two of his lookalikes.

The December 21 episode of SmackDown! opened with Vickie Guerrero, who was now in a wheelchair due to receiving a Tombstone Piledriver from The Undertaker and would remain in a wheelchair for the majority of the following year. Vickie, begrudgingly being pushed to the ring by Long, brought with her the World Heavyweight Championship and then introduced Edge to present the title to him. The two then revealed Edge's doppelgangers were the Major Brothers, who made a speech retconning their previous gimmick of being brothers and now proclaimed themselves to be Curt Hawkins and Zack Ryder, dubbed as Edgeheads, fans and protégés of Edge.

==== Edge and Vickie's engagement ====
As well as being opposed by Batista and The Undertaker, the group faced a different kind of opposition from Chavo Guerrero. Chavo, Vickie's nephew, voiced his misgiving about her relationship with Edge, thinking it disrespected the Guerrero name, alluding to Vickie being the off-screen widow of Eddie Guerrero. Despite being forced to face Edge's enemies, Chavo was soon brought around and welcomed into the group when Edge appeared on the January 15, 2008 episode of ECW to help Chavo win contendership for the ECW Championship by beating CM Punk, having lost twice already. Using her power to influence ECW General Manager Armando Estrada, Vickie turned Chavo's championship match into a no disqualification and with Edge using a spear on Punk, Chavo defeated Punk to win the ECW Championship on the January 22 episode of ECW. With two World Championships in their possession, Edge and Vickie's relationship fully established, and Chavo fully on board, the group began to act as a family, thereby calling themselves La Familia.

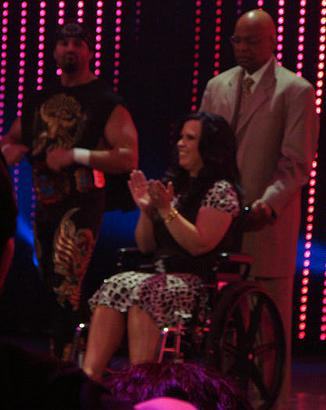
Vickie Guerrero spent much of her time in a wheelchair. She is seen here being pushed by Teddy Long and accompanied by nephew, Chavo Guerrero

Meanwhile, Vickie was also using her power on SmackDown to help Edge retain his championship. When Edge was forced to defend his championship at the Royal Rumble on January 27, Vickie announced a Beat the Clock challenge, placing perennial rivals Batista and The Undertaker in difficult matches, facing Hawkins and Ryder in a handicap match and having a special guest referee, respectively. However, The Undertaker used his powers to turn the arena lights out and attack Edge, which helped Rey Mysterio to become the contender. At the Royal Rumble, Edge came to the ring with his entourage, aside from Chavo, who was participating in the Royal Rumble match later that evening. Hawkins and Ryder were sent from ring side early during the match and Mysterio almost beat Edge after using his 619 finishing move, but as the referee tried to count for three, Vickie rose up from her chair and pulled the official from the ring. As Mysterio reprimanded Vickie, Edge tried to run into him, but ended up on the ropes, once again allowing Mysterio to attempt another 619; however, this time Vickie jumped on the ropes and hugged Edge, protecting him from the move and giving Edge enough time to recover and use his spear to pin Mysterio and win the match. On the February 15 episode of SmackDown, the week before the No Way Out pay-per-view on February 17, with Vickie back in her wheelchair as a result of Mysterio's 619, Edge proposed to Vickie. After she accepted, Mysterio came to the ring and voiced his disappointment at the union and proceeded to come at Edge with a springboard senton, but as he ducked, Mysterio hit Vickie instead. At No Way Out, Edge retained the World Heavyweight Championship over Mysterio again to end their rivalry, while Chavo successfully defended the ECW Championship against Punk. However, The Undertaker also became the new contender for Edge's championship at the pay-per-view, and La Familia began to target him, with Edge, Hawkins, and Ryder defeating The Undertaker in a handicap match on SmackDown in March. The entire group (aside from Vickie) also took on Ric Flair and Shawn Michaels in a steel cage match, but The Undertaker invaded the cage using his powers, attacking the group as Edge climbed over the cage in fear to win the match for the team.

At WrestleMania XXIV on March 30, both Edge and Chavo lost their championships to The Undertaker and Kane respectively, with Edge tapping out to Undertaker's new gogoplata submission move (which would eventually be called Hell's Gate) and Chavo making a WrestleMania record by losing in nine seconds. While signing a contract for his rematch, Chavo introduced Bam Neely, given a history as a border guard turned body guard, as his new enforcer and member of La Familia. Despite this help and Vickie's power, both Edge and Chavo failed to win back their titles at Backlash on April 27, with Edge being stretchered out after again submitting to the eventual Hell's Gate. On the May 2 episode of SmackDown, Vickie announced that The Undertaker's chokehold was an illegal move and banned The Undertaker from using it, slapping him and saying "Hell hath no fury over a woman scorned!", stripping The Undertaker of the World Heavyweight Championship. Later that month, on the May 16 episode of SmackDown, Vickie was forced by the WWE Board of Directors to compete against The Undertaker in what she subsequently made a six-on-one handicap match featuring all of La Familia. However, Chavo and Neely left before the match began, feeling used by the group, though they were brought on side the next week. At Judgment Day on May 18, The Undertaker defeated Edge by countout, but instantly after the match Vickie announced that the title would remain vacant as The Undertaker won by countout, under which a championship would not normally change hands. The next month at One Night Stand on June 1, a rematch for the vacant championship was given two stipulations: firstly it was a Tables, Ladders, and Chairs match, Edge's specialty; and secondly, if The Undertaker lost, he would be banished from WWE. After interference from La Familia, Edge reclaimed the World Heavyweight Championship after pushing The Undertaker off a ladder and through four tables, forcing his storyline exile from WWE television. Following this, Batista set his sights on Edge and avoided being banished himself by beating The Great Khali to earn a title match. With Chavo as referee, Edge retained the championship at Night of Champions on June 29, but the next night on Raw, Batista attacked Edge while he was making a speech and afterwards CM Punk used his Money in the Bank contract to make an instant championship match and win the belt.

==== The wedding and initial dissolution ====
On the July 4 episode of SmackDown, Edge's frustrations about losing the World Heavyweight Championship which he could not reclaim materialized when he assaulted Festus, an opponent of Hawkins and Ryder, and canceled his wedding with Vickie. The following week, Chavo, Neely, Hawkins, and Ryder were seen backstage agreeing with both Vickie and Edge in their argument while Edge was punished the next week by being forced into a no-disqualification match against Big Show. However, after watching Edge receive punishment from Big Show, she stopped the match and the two embraced in the ring, both expressing their love. The following week, on July 18, SmackDown became a wedding reception with La Familia at the top of the ramp all evening in formal dress with a table and large wedding cake, while highlights were shown of Edge and Vickie's wedding that were filmed earlier in the day. During the evening, Cherry lost her match and afterwards Vickie declared an impromptu match, capitalizing on Cherry's defeat to pin her herself giving Vickie her first wrestling win. However, also during the evening The Hardys were forced to compete against each other, but tipped over the wedding cake in protest and the show ended with Triple H giving a mock celebration speech. During the speech, he revealed hidden camera video footage of Edge talking to the wedding planner Alicia Fox about Vickie, mocking her size and eventually kissing Fox.

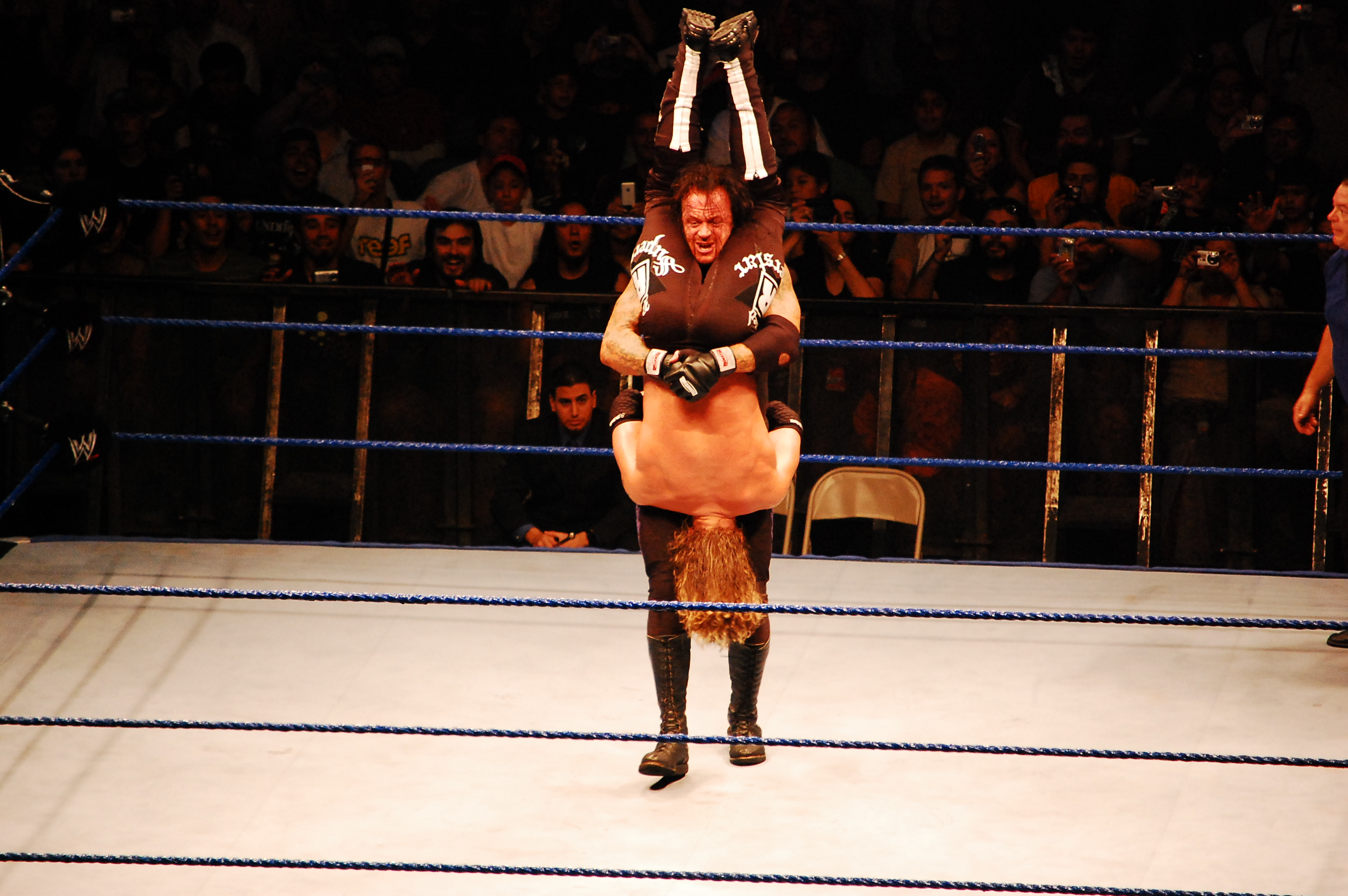
The Undertaker, here giving Edge a Tombstone Piledriver, sent Edge to Hell

At The Great American Bash on July 20, Hawkins and Ryder won the WWE Tag Team Championship in a Four-Way Tag Team match. However, during Edge's WWE Championship match against Triple H, Fox attempted to hand Edge the WWE Championship belt to use as weapon, but was stopped with a clothesline by Vickie. Vickie then picked up the belt and prepared to use it, but Fox started fighting with her again and while the referee tried to separate the two women Edge attempted to spear the referee, who fell to the ground with Fox just beforehand resulting in Edge spearing Vickie. Triple H used this distraction to recover and hit a Pedigree to retain his title. The following week on SmackDown, Edge tried to apologize to all the members of La Familia, though after Bam Neely was unsure whether Edge wanted to apologize or wanted Vickie to apologize to him when reiterating the story. Edge closed the show in the ring, asking for forgiveness and blaming it all on Fox. Vickie came out and teased forgiveness, but at that moment, Vickie laughed evilly after she revealed that she had reinstated The Undertaker and booked the two in his specialty match, the Hell in a Cell, at SummerSlam on August 17.

On the August 15 episode of SmackDown, a week after having already turned on the others, Edge kidnapped Vickie in her wheelchair and rode her round the building taunting her until he pushed her to the ring, tipping her out onto the stage and then lying next to her, watching a montage video of their moments together mixed with advice received from Mick Foley about having to become more tough and deranged (like his old self) to defeat The Undertaker. Despite his new attitude, The Undertaker defeated Edge in his return match and after pinning him, chokeslammed him from the top of a ladder causing him to fall through the mat, which flames came up through shortly afterwards as the commentators announced Edge had been sent to hell.

After SummerSlam, Vickie tried to apologize to the WWE fans and The Undertaker, blaming Edge for being a negative influence, but despite this The Undertaker appeared on the August 22 episode of SmackDown, and attacked all of La Familia in an attempt to get to Vickie who managed to escape. La Familia began to dissipate, however, as Chavo and Neely began to argue due to costing each other victories in matches by interfering. Neely was later released while Hawkins and Ryder stopped being seen with Vickie. At Unforgiven on September 7, Big Show came to the ring to voice his frustration at Vickie for keeping him out of the main event match. After she came to the ring to defend herself, the lights went dim signalling the arrival of The Undertaker, fulfilling his promise to come take her soul for banishing him. Despite holding her hostage, Big Show suddenly attacked The Undertaker and revealed he was in cahoots with her. Big Show was revealed to be protecting Vickie in a strictly business arrangement, though he would unwittingly leave her at the hands of The Undertaker on the September 26 episode of SmackDown, resulting in her receiving another Tombstone Piledriver which put her back in a wheelchair. Earlier that night, Hawkins and Ryder lost the WWE Tag Team Championship to The Colóns.

==== Family reunion ====
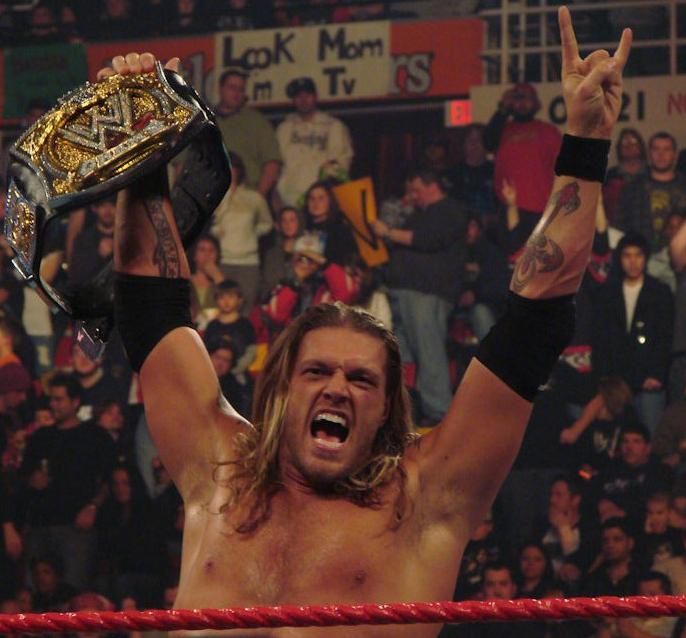
Edge after winning his fourth WWE Championship

Big Show kept The Undertaker at bay from Vickie until November at Survivor Series on November 23, where The Undertaker beat him in a Casket match. However, at Survivor Series, SmackDown's WWE Championship match was missing a competitor after Jeff Hardy was reported to have been hospitalized after being attacked in his hotel as part of the storyline. The match became a singles match between Triple H and the challenging Vladimir Kozlov, but towards the end of the match Vickie came out announcing the third competitor had arrived, but rather than the expected Hardy it was a returning Edge. Hardy chased out afterwards in a neck brace swinging a chair, but accidentally hit Triple H and Kozlov, allowing Edge to gain an easy pin to win the WWE Championship. With this La Familia reformed as just Vickie, Edge, and Chavo with Edge's problems at the forefront of their attention. They feuded with both former champion Triple H and Jeff Hardy, who would both earn a shot at Edge's championship at Armageddon on December 14, where Hardy pinned Edge to win the championship. On the road to their rematch at the Royal Rumble on January 25, 2009, Vickie used her alliance with Big Show to have him weaken Hardy for Edge, promising Big Show a title match if he beat Hardy, but later revealing to Edge this was just a ruse; regardless Hardy won and Edge had his rematch at the Royal Rumble, winning the WWE Championship again after Jeff's own brother Matt attacked him with a chair, following his own loss earlier in the evening, leading to the reveal that Matt had been Jeff's attacker all along. During this time, Vickie had a brief feud with Triple H where she tried to keep him out of the Royal Rumble match and he blackmailed her with naked photographs of her he had procured, resulting in Triple H helping Montel Vontavious Porter (who was on a four month losing streak) defeat Big Show to gain a place in the match.

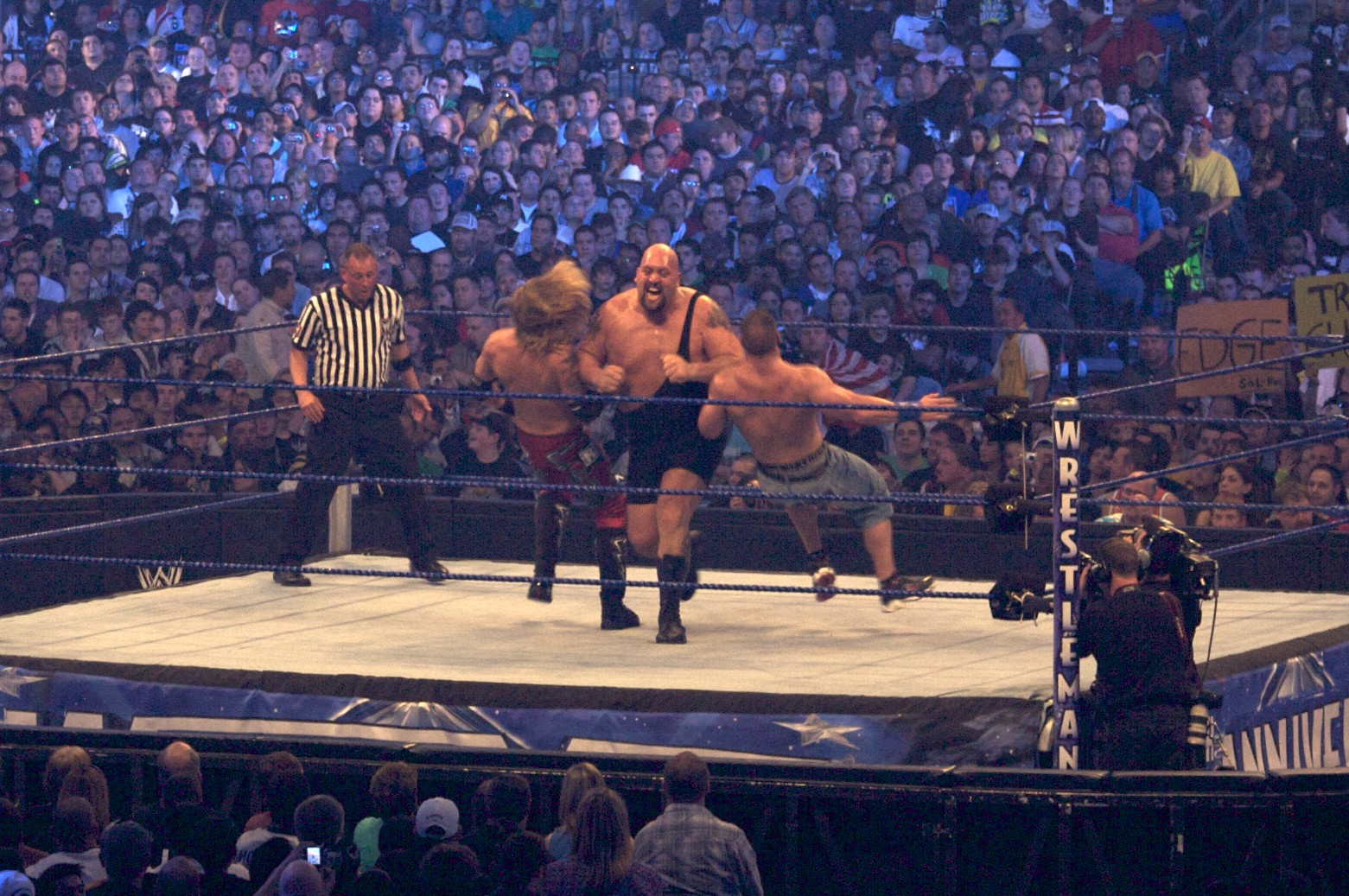
Vickie Guerrero put Big Show in the World Heavyweight Championship match at WrestleMania 25

As both world champions were forced to defend their championships inside an Elimination Chamber, Edge opened No Way Out on February 15 by being the first competitor in the ring, opposite Jeff Hardy. Hardy delivered a shock upset to Edge by rolling a Spear attempt into a pin and pinning him within three minutes, before any other wrestler entered the match. This ensured Edge had lost the WWE Championship and a new champion would be crowned, ultimately Triple H. Living up to his nickname of the Ultimate Opportunist, though, Edge later appeared in the main event of the evening by attacking Kofi Kingston with a chair until he was unable to compete in the Elimination Chamber for the World Heavyweight Championship, locking himself in one of the pods and refusing to come out. After eliminating reigning champion John Cena third, Edge went on to pin Rey Mysterio to win the match and become World Heavyweight Champion once again. The following night on Raw, Vickie explained that with Raw General Manager Stephanie McMahon absent tending to her brother Shane in the hospital after his match with Randy Orton, she was the highest in command and with Kingston injured a replacement had to be found, giving Edge's forced entry into the match carte blanche. Later in that evening, McMahon was attacked by Orton, which left Vickie as the interim General Manager of Raw as well as SmackDown. Cena demanded an instant rematch, which he won, but as it was by disqualification the title did not change hands. Edge revealed that he had asked Big Show to look after Vickie while he was gone and consequently gave him a World Heavyweight Championship match at WrestleMania 25 on April 5. However, at the contract signing, Cena interfered and blackmailed Vickie into making it a Triple Threat match; the next week, after signing the contract, he revealed he was blackmailing Vickie with footage of her sharing a kiss with Big Show. At WrestleMania, Cena pinned Big Show and won the World Heavyweight Championship.

==== Divorce and dissolution ====
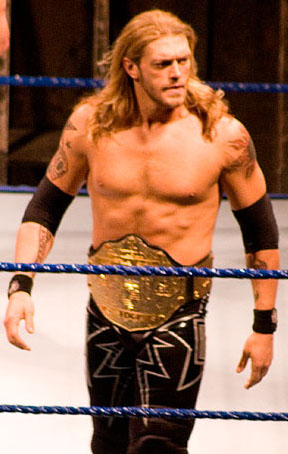
Edge as World Heavyweight Champion

The night after WrestleMania, April 6, on Raw, Vickie announced she could no longer be General Manager of both shows and chose to continue on Raw alone. She also booked Edge in a rematch for the World Heavyweight Championship against John Cena at Backlash on April 26 and made it a Last Man Standing match. Their match at Backlash ended on the stage, where Big Show came out and chokeslammed Cena through a searchlight that was used as a decorative prop making sure Cena could not answer the ten count and that Edge regained the championship. This returned the World Heavyweight Championship to the SmackDown brand, while Chavo was drafted to Raw alongside Vickie. Meanwhile Edge rekindled his feud with Jeff Hardy and faced new members on the SmackDown roster vying for his title. In early May, CM Punk, who again held the Money in the Bank briefcase, faced Edge in a series of non-title singles matches and vowed to cash in his championship match after winning. However, both attempts at this (and various attempts to interfere in Edge's matches) ended with an interference from Umaga which prevented Punk from winning the belt. After this, Hardy became the main contender for Edge's championship, but Edge successfully defended it at Judgment Day on May 17 when Matt Hardy, who had just finished a rivalry with Jeff, hit his brother from behind. The following night on Raw, Vickie rewarded Matt for his help with a match for the United States Championship. However, because of the interference, Jeff received a rematch at Extreme Rules on June 7, but this time it was a ladder match which Jeff won.

Meanwhile, Vickie thanked Big Show, who had also been drafted to Raw, for helping Edge at Backlash by putting him in a contendership match for the WWE Championship, but when he tried to kiss her she told him their previous affair was a mistake and she wanted a purely professional relationship, ending any affair they may have had. On Raw, she then entered into a feud with Santino Marella after Marella made disparaging remarks about Vickie's appearance, calling her a pig in relation to the swine flu outbreak. The wrestler who portrayed Santino was involved in a storyline where he played his twin sister, Santina Marella, at the time so that when Vickie accused Santino of insulting her, Santina acted innocently though also made similar jokes. On the May 18 episode of Raw, the feud reached a head when Vickie demanded Santina face her in a match following some comical skits where Chavo tried to teach her some Guerrero family moves, before making it a no-disqualification match so that Chavo and William Regal could interfere and help her to win the match and become Miss WrestleMania. Their rematch for the crown, at Extreme Rules, was a Hog Pen match where, despite having Chavo at her side, Vickie lost the match and the title. The following night on the June 8 episode of Raw, Vickie voiced her anger at the crowd for not sympathising with her while she was being humiliated. Subsequently she announced she was quitting as General Manager of Raw which prompted Edge to come out and announce that he only married her for her power and with no power anymore, he insulted her appearance and demanded a divorce.

=== All Elite Wrestling (2024) ===
15 years later after La Familia's dissolution, Edge, now goes by the name of Adam Copeland, had challenged Matt Cardona (formerly Zack Ryder) for the AEW TNT Championship on the March 30, 2024 episode of AEW Collision. Copeland retained the title after defeating Cardona.

== Championships and accomplishments ==
- Pro Wrestling Illustrated
  - PWI ranked Edge #2 of the 500 best singles wrestlers in the PWI 500 in 2007
  - PWI ranked Bam Neely #296 of the 500 best singles wrestlers in the PWI 500 in 2008
  - PWI ranked Curt Hawkins #141 of the 500 best singles wrestlers in the PWI 500 in 2008
- WWE
  - World Heavyweight Championship (4 times) – Edge
  - WWE Championship (2 times) – Edge
  - ECW Championship (1 time) – Chavo Guerrero Jr.
  - Miss WrestleMania (1 time) – Vickie Guerrero
  - WWE Tag Team Championship (1 time) – Curt Hawkins and Zack Ryder
  - Slammy Award for Couple of the Year (2008) – Edge and Vickie Guerrero

== Members ==
*	Founding member(s)
L	Leader

Member		Joined	Left
Edge	*L	November 18, 2007	June 8, 2009
Vickie Guerrero	*	November 18, 2007	June 8, 2009
Chavo Guerrero		January 11, 2008	June 8, 2009
Curt Hawkins		December 16, 2007	August 17, 2008
Zack Ryder		December 16, 2007	August 17, 2008
Bam Neely		April 8, 2008	August 8. 2008
