= SummerSlam (2008) =

World Wrestling Entertainment pay-per-view event

- Promotional poster featuring Maria
- Promotion: World Wrestling Entertainment
- Brand(s): Raw; SmackDown; ECW
- Date: August 17, 2008
- City: Indianapolis, Indiana
- Venue: Conseco Fieldhouse
- Attendance: 15,997
- Buy rate: 477,000
- Tagline: The Biggest Blockbuster of the Summer

Pay-per-view chronology
← Previous; The Great American Bash	Next → Unforgiven

SummerSlam chronology
← Previous; 2007	Next → 2009

The 2008 SummerSlam was a professional wrestling pay-per-view (PPV) event produced by World Wrestling Entertainment (WWE). It was the 21st annual SummerSlam and took place on August 17, 2008, at Conseco Fieldhouse in Indianapolis, Indiana, held for wrestlers from the promotion's Raw, SmackDown, and ECW brand divisions. It was the first PPV of the PG Era and it was also the first SummerSlam PPV broadcast in high definition.

Seven professional wrestling matches were featured on the event's card. The event featured a supercard, a scheduling of more than one main event. The first, featuring wrestlers from the SmackDown brand, saw The Undertaker defeat Edge in a Hell in a Cell match, a match that saw both men fight in a ring surrounded by a roofed steel cell. The other main event featured wrestlers from the Raw brand, in which Batista defeated John Cena in a standard wrestling match which would be Batista's last SummerSlam appearance. Three featured bouts were scheduled on the undercard. In a standard match from SmackDown, WWE Champion Triple H defeated challenger The Great Khali to retain his title. Another was a standard match involving wrestlers the Raw brand, where World Heavyweight Champion CM Punk defeated challenger John "Bradshaw" Layfield (JBL) to retain his title. The ECW brand's sole contribution to the card saw Matt Hardy defeat ECW Champion Mark Henry by disqualification, as a result of WWE regulations, Hardy did not win the title as they can only be won via pinfall or submission unless otherwise stipulated.

== Production ==
=== Background ===
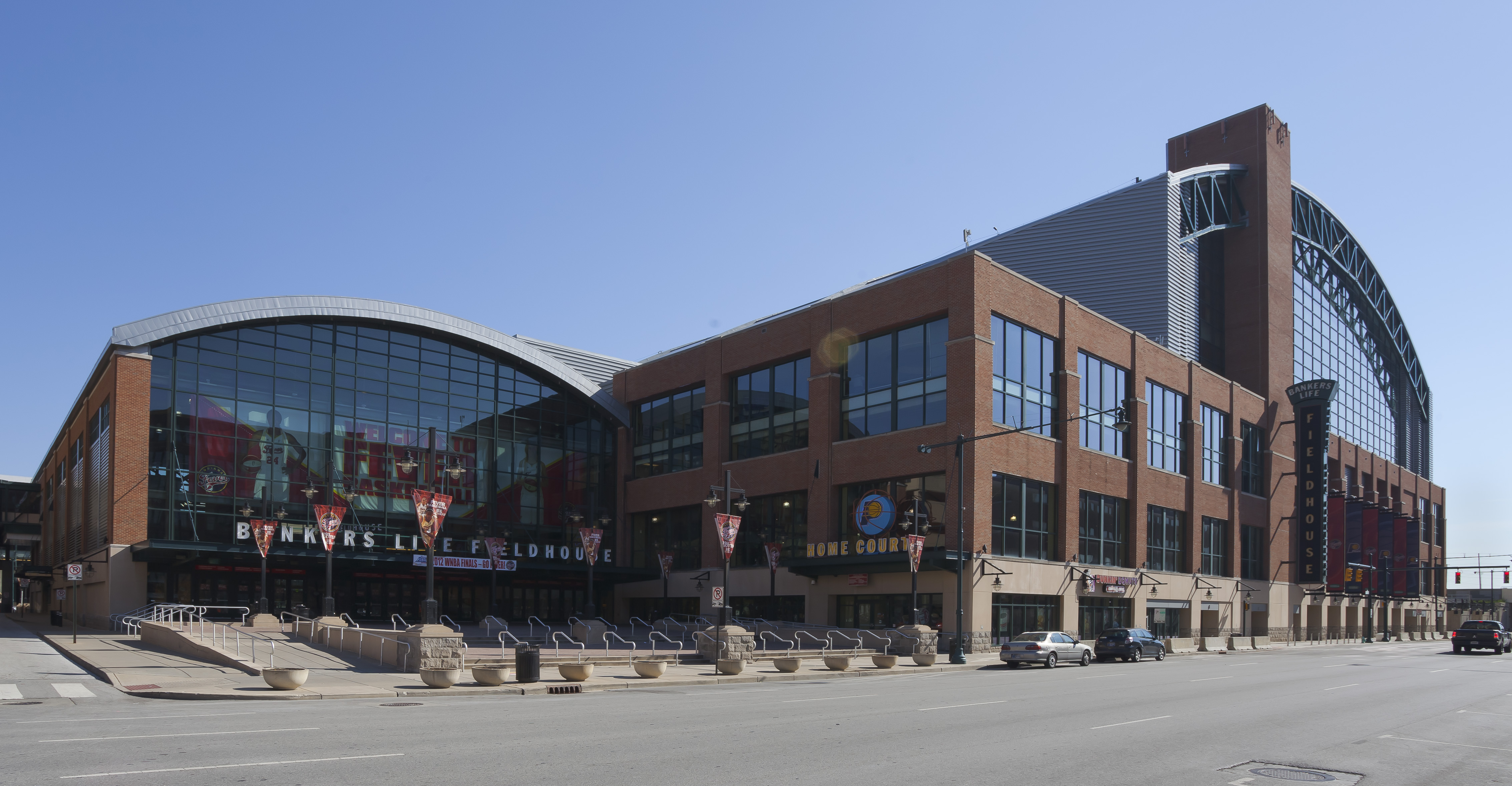
The 21st annual SummerSlam was held at the Conseco Fieldhouse in Indianapolis, Indiana.

SummerSlam is an annual professional wrestling pay-per-view (PPV) event produced every August by World Wrestling Entertainment (WWE) since 1988. Dubbed "The Biggest Party of the Summer", it is one of the promotion's original four pay-per-views, along with WrestleMania, Royal Rumble, and Survivor Series, referred to as the "Big Four". It has since become considered WWE's second biggest event of the year behind WrestleMania. The 21st SummerSlam was scheduled to be held on August 17, 2008, at the Conseco Fieldhouse in Indianapolis, Indiana and featured wrestlers from the Raw, SmackDown, and ECW brands. It was the first SummerSlam PPV broadcast in high definition.

=== Storylines ===
The buildup to the matches and the scenarios that took place before, during, and after the event were planned by WWE's creative staff. The event featured wrestlers from the Raw, SmackDown, and ECW brands: storyline expansions of the promotion where employees are assigned to wrestling brands under the WWE banner.

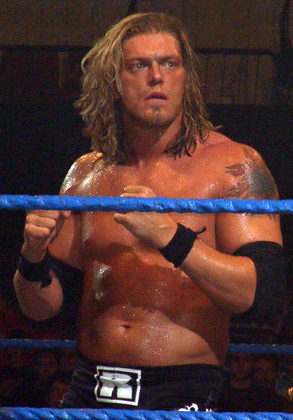
Edge faced Undertaker inside Hell in a Cell

The main rivalry on the SmackDown brand was between Edge and The Undertaker. During 2008, the two had previously fought in four pay-per-view events over the World Heavyweight Championship. The two would finally face each other in a Tables, Ladders, and Chairs match at One Night Stand for the vacant World Heavyweight Championship. An additional stipulation was added to the match, in which, if The Undertaker should lose the match, he would be banished from WWE. Edge won the match, thus The Undertaker was forced to leave WWE as part of the storyline. On the July 18 episode of SmackDown, Edge and General Manager Vickie Guerrero held their scripted wedding reception. At the end of the show as Guerrero and Edge were in the ring, Triple H appeared to reveal Edge's secret love affair with Edge and Guerrero's wedding planner, Alicia Fox. During Edge and Triple H's match for the WWE Championship at The Great American Bash, both Guerrero and Fox would interfere, in the process Vickie got speared and the distraction gave Triple H the opportunity to retain his title. Despite an apology from Edge on the July 25 episode of SmackDown, Guerrero announced that she had reinstated The Undertaker and announced that he would face Edge at SummerSlam in a Hell in a Cell match.

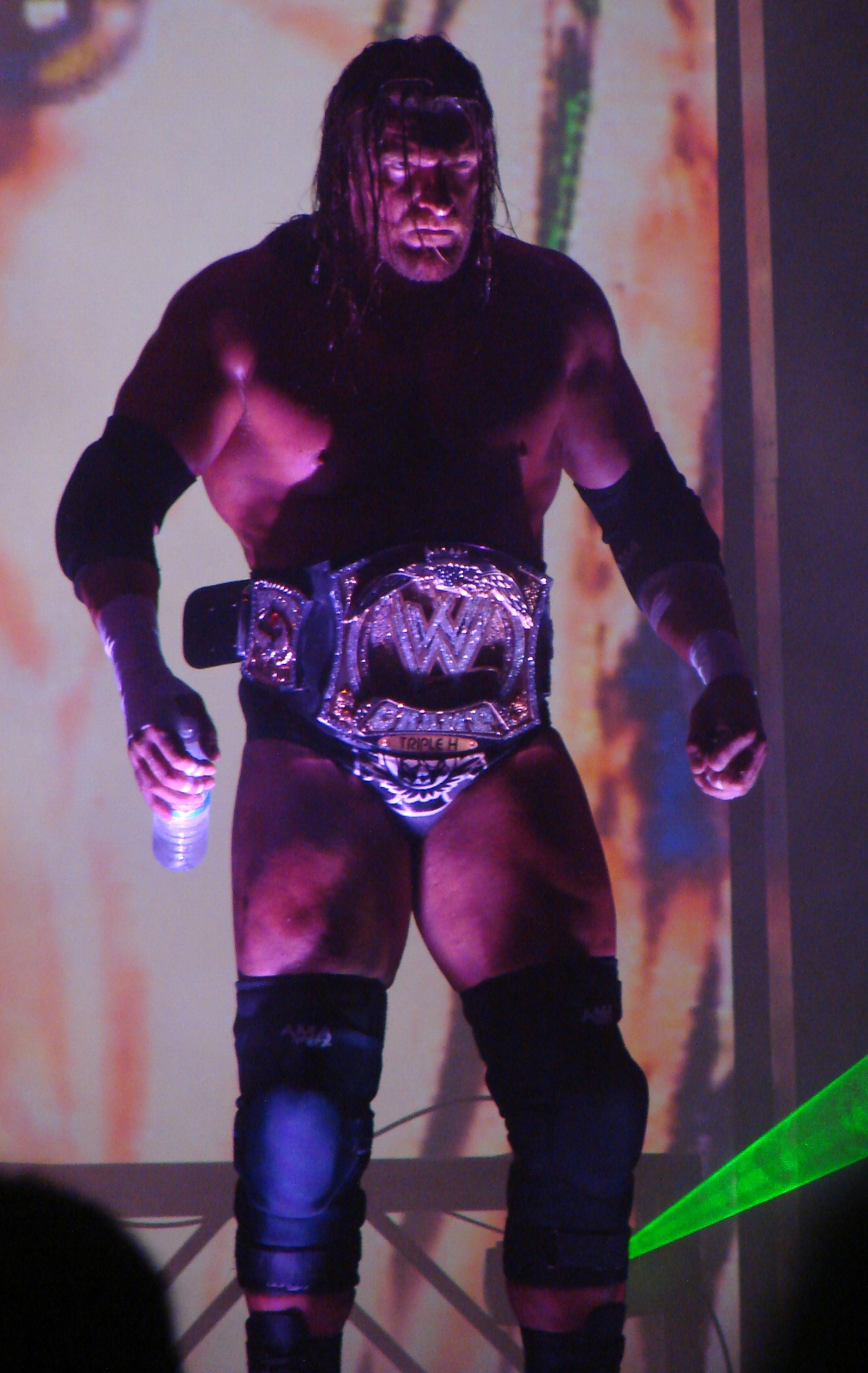
Champion Triple H, who feuded with The Great Khali over SmackDown's WWE Championship.

Another rivalry from the SmackDown brand was between Triple H and The Great Khali over the WWE Championship. On the July 25 episode of SmackDown, a Battle Royal was held, where the winner would receive a WWE Championship match against Triple H at SummerSlam. Khali won the match, which also involved The Big Show, Jeff Hardy, Mr. Kennedy, Umaga, and Montel Vontavious Porter (MVP).

The primary rivalry on the Raw brand heading into SummerSlam was between John Cena and Batista. On the July 21 episode of Raw, Batista faced CM Punk for the World Heavyweight Championship in a rematch from The Great American Bash. John "Bradshaw" Layfield (JBL) ran into the ring, trying to avoid a vengeful John Cena. When Cena looked to punch JBL, he ducked and Batista was hit instead. Batista started a brawl against Cena and the two eventually fought until referees broke it up. The next week, Batista claimed that he had no problems with Cena, who had a hard time believing it. Later that night, Cena and Batista beat JBL and Kane in a tag-team match. New General Manager Mike Adamle announced that the two men would face off at SummerSlam, making it the first time ever that the two men had faced off against each other, a match that had been six years in the making. Both men won the World Tag Team Championship against Cody Rhodes and Ted DiBiase Jr.. They lost the title a week later in a rematch.

Another main feud on the Raw brand was between John "Bradshaw" Layfield (JBL) and CM Punk for the World Heavyweight Championship. JBL became the number one contender for Punk's title, when he pinned Punk in a two-on-one handicap match, which also featured Chris Jericho as JBL's tag team partner.

The main feud on the ECW brand was between Mark Henry and Matt Hardy over the ECW Championship. On the July 22 episode of ECW on Syfy, Hardy won the right to face Henry at SummerSlam after winning a fatal four-way match against Finlay, The Miz, and John Morrison.

== Event ==
Other on-screen personnel
Role:	Name:
English commentators	Michael Cole (Raw)
English commentators	Jerry Lawler (Raw)
English commentators	Jim Ross (SmackDown)
English commentators	Tazz (SmackDown)
English commentators	Todd Grisham (ECW)
English commentators	Matt Striker (ECW)
Spanish commentators	Carlos Cabrera
Spanish commentators	Hugo Savinovich
Backstage interviewer	Maria Kanellis
Ring announcers	Lilian Garcia (Raw)
Ring announcers	Justin Roberts (SmackDown)
Ring announcers	Tony Chimel (ECW)
Referees	Mike Chioda (Raw)
Referees	John Cone (Raw)
Referees	Marty Elias (Raw)
Referees	Charles Robinson (SmackDown)
Referees	Mickie Henson (SmackDown)
Referees	Scott Armstrong (SmackDown)
Referees	Mike Posey (ECW)

Before the event aired live on pay-per-view, The Big Show defeated Bam Neely, who was accompanied by Chavo Guerrero, in a dark match. Big Show won by pinning Neely after a WMD – Weapon of Mass Destruction.

=== Preliminary matches ===
The first match aired was between Jeff Hardy and Montel Vontavious Porter (MVP). Some of the highlights of the match included MVP delivering a belly to belly suplex to Hardy who landed hard on the turnbuckle and later, MVP kicked Hardy across the ring as the latter tried to deliver his rope-aided corner dropkick. The match involved series of counters and submission holds. Near the end, after delivering the Whisper in the Wind, when Hardy tried to execute the Swanton Bomb on MVP, Shelton Benjamin appeared, but Hardy took him out. In the ring, Hardy missed his Swanton Bomb, and MVP quickly kicked Hardy in the face and pinned him to win the match.

The second match of the evening was a "Winners Take All" intergender tag team match with the WWE Intercontinental Champion Kofi Kingston and the WWE Women's Champion Mickie James defending their titles against Santino Marella and Beth Phoenix. The match started with James and Phoenix, who countered each other's moves for sometime. Later, they both tagged in their male partners, who continued the match. In the end, Marella tossed Kingston over the top rope and then suffered from a Mickie-DT from James. This allowed Phoenix to capitalize and she delivered the Glam Slam to James and pinned her to win herself the WWE Women's Championship and Santino the Intercontinental Championship.

The pay-per-view continued with Shawn Michaels coming out to the ring with his wife Rebecca to announce that after consulting his doctors and his family, he had decided to, in storyline, "retire" from professional wrestling due to all the injuries he had suffered throughout his career. Chris Jericho interrupted Michaels' address, came down to the ring and asked him to say that he was quitting WWE because of what Jericho did to him. In retaliation, Michaels insulted Jericho, calling him a "vile and selfish human being", and said that he should go home and tell his family that "he (Jericho) will never ever be Shawn Michaels". As Michaels and Rebecca were about to leave the ring, Jericho stopped Michaels and attempted to punch him, but accidentally hit Rebecca in the face. Jericho left the ring, as Michaels and WWE medical trainers attended to Rebecca, who appeared to have a legitimate swollen lip.

The third match was between Mark Henry and Matt Hardy for the ECW Championship. Early on in the match, Hardy delivered a Twist of Fate to Henry and covered him for a pinfall attempt, but Henry's manager Tony Atlas pulled Hardy out of the ring and assaulted him. This forced the referee to call for a disqualification with Hardy as the winner of the match, but as titles don't change hands on disqualification or countout, Henry retained the ECW title. As Atlas was assaulting Matt outside, Jeff Hardy came down to his brother's aid and delivered a Swanton Bomb to Atlas from the ring apron. Later, The Hardys performed a double suplex on Henry outside the ring.

=== Main event matches ===
The fourth match on the card was the featured preliminary match from the Raw brand which saw CM Punk defend the World Heavyweight Championship against John "Bradshaw" Layfield (JBL). Both men's heads collided mid-match, resulting in some bleeding from Punk. After dominating the majority of the match, JBL was defeated after a GTS (Go To Sleep) from Punk, resulting in Punk retaining the title.

The next match was the featured preliminary match from SmackDown, featuring Triple H defending the WWE Championship against The Great Khali. Triple H was attacked early in the match by a double-handed chokeslam from Khali – a move normally used as a finisher. Khali controlled the match with his strength, until Triple H attacked his legs. The end came when Khali blocked two Pedigree attempts, only to fall to a third attempt to allow Triple H to retain the title.

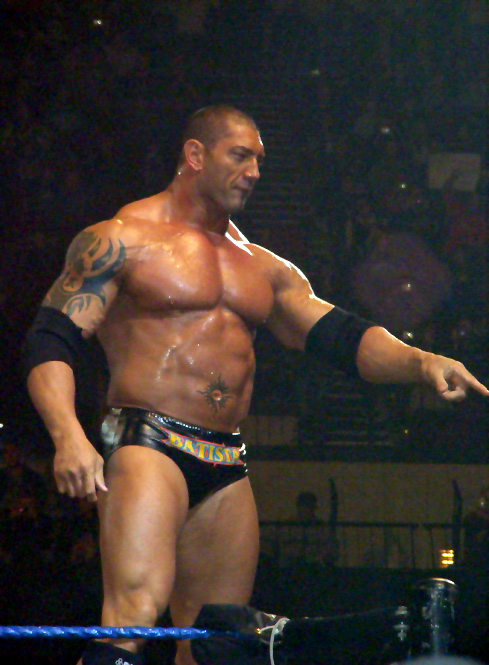
Batista, who defeated John Cena in the Raw brand's main event.

The penultimate match was the Raw brand's main event between John Cena and Batista. The fans were split on the two fan favorites, and each man performed numerous signature moves on the other to try to score the pinfall. After paying tribute to his former mentor, Ric Flair, by using his chop block and figure four leglock submission hold, Batista attempted to end the match but was trapped in the STFU. Towards the end of the match, Cena successfully countered a powerslam attempt into a fireman's carry, and executed the FU to Batista for a near-fall. In turn, Batista countered a diving leg drop into the Batista Bomb for a near-fall. Batista pinned Cena following a second Batista Bomb for the victory.

In the final match, The Undertaker faced Edge in a Hell in a Cell match. Early in the match, The Undertaker and Edge both used the steel steps as a weapon. Edge began introducing the trademark weapons of his speciality match, the Tables, Ladders, and Chairs match. Edge put The Undertaker through a table with a chair-assisted diving elbow drop. The Undertaker then took control until Edge performed a Spear on The Undertaker through a cell panel, causing both men to fall outside the structure near the announcers' tables. Edge and The Undertaker fought outside the cell, where Edge performed another Spear through a broadcast table on The Undertaker. Back in the cell, Edge performed a third Spear on The Undertaker for a near-fall. Edge attempted to perform Old School on The Undertaker, but The Undertaker countered the move and performed a chokeslam from the top-rope through two tables positioned outside the ring on Edge. The Undertaker then hit Edge with a television camera, a Spear and a con-chair-to, taking revenge on Edge for attacking him the same way at the previous year's Survivor Series. The Tombstone Piledriver ended the match with a victory for The Undertaker. After the match, however, as The Undertaker was leaving, he saw on the titantron that Edge was still moving. So he went back in the ring to finish him off for good and chokeslammed Edge off of a ladder through the center of the ring, through the canvas. Then The Undertaker went down and posed with flames engulfing the collapsed area of the canvas. Closing the show, commentator Jim Ross alluded that Edge had been sent to Hell.

== Reception ==
Conseco Fieldhouse has a maximum capacity of 18,345, but that was reduced for SummerSlam. The event had an attendance of 15,977, of which approximately 13,000 had paid a gate of $500,000.

Canadian Online Explorer's professional wrestling section rated the entire event a 6.5 out of 10 stars, the same as the SummerSlam event in 2007. The Hell in a Cell main event match from the SmackDown brand rated an 8.5 out of 10 stars. The Raw brand's main event, John Cena versus Batista, was less well received and was rated a 6.5 out of 10 stars.

== Aftermath ==
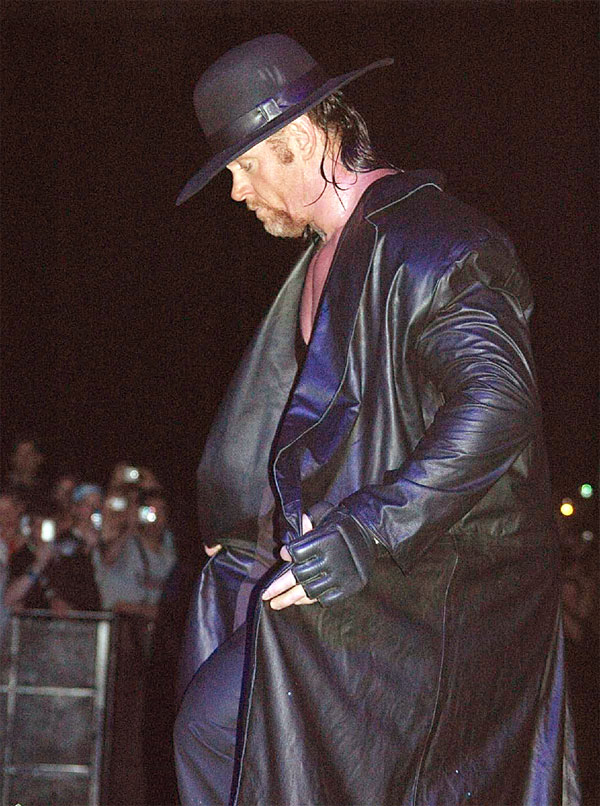
The Undertaker, who feuded with La Familia after SummerSlam.

After their Hell in a Cell match, the year-long rivalry between Edge and Undertaker officially ended, which was one of the last two rivalries in the Ruthless Aggression Era. The last rivalry in the Ruthless Aggression Era, being the feud with Shawn Michaels and Chris Jericho, would go on until November 10, 2008. The rivalry would end with a Last Man Standing Match between the two men where Jericho beat Michaels. After that rivalry ended, it marked the true official end of the Ruthless Aggression Era to many because following the November 10, 2008, episode of Raw, the transition in the PG Era became more noticeable.

=== Raw ===
Both main event feuds for the Raw brand were set to continue at Unforgiven with each men involved in a new concept five-man match called the Championship Scramble match for the World Heavyweight Championship that would also involve Kane. It was later revealed, however, that the SummerSlam match between Cena and Batista left Cena with a legitimate herniated disc. Cena's injury saw him replaced in the match with Rey Mysterio Jr. Cena would not return until three months later at Survivor Series where he defeated the reigning champion Chris Jericho to win the World Heavyweight Championship.

=== SmackDown ===
With Edge written out of action, The Undertaker's rivalry with him was re-focused towards one with the remaining members of La Familia. On the August 22 episode of SmackDown, Vickie Guerrero tried to apologize to Undertaker for her actions. Despite this, The Undertaker decided to launch an attack at La Familia. The following week saw Undertaker vow revenge on the stable.

The SmackDown brand also featured its own Championship Scramble match at Unforgiven with Triple H defending his WWE Championship against The Brian Kendrick, Shelton Benjamin, Montel Vontavious Porter and Jeff Hardy. In spite of this, Triple H's rivalry with The Great Khali continued when Triple H aided Jeff Hardy during his Scramble qualification match against Khali with a chair shot.

=== ECW ===
A title rematch between Matt Hardy and Mark Henry was made at the next episode of ECW on Syfy, which Henry won from interference by Tony Atlas. Shortly afterward, ECW General Manager Theodore Long announced that ECW would have its own Championship Scramble at Unforgiven for the ECW Championship, which Hardy managed to qualify for along with The Miz, Chavo Guerrero, and Finlay.

== Results ==
No.	Results	Stipulations	Times
1^{D}	Big Show defeated Bam Neely (with Chavo Guerrero)	Singles match	—
2	Montel Vontavious Porter defeated Jeff Hardy	Singles match	10:10
3	Glamarella (Santino Marella and Beth Phoenix) defeated Kofi Kingston (Intercontinental) and Mickie James (Women's)	Winners Take All Mixed tag team match for the WWE Intercontinental Championship and WWE Women's Championship	5:25
4	Matt Hardy defeated Mark Henry (c) (with Tony Atlas) by disqualification	Singles match for the ECW Championship	0:33
5	CM Punk (c) defeated John "Bradshaw" Layfield	Singles match for the World Heavyweight Championship	11:24
6	Triple H (c) defeated The Great Khali (with Ranjin Singh)	Singles match for the WWE Championship	9:20
7	Batista defeated John Cena	Singles match	13:41
8	The Undertaker defeated Edge	Hell in a Cell match	26:44
(c) / – the champion(s) heading into the match; D / – this was a dark match
