= Cherry (American wrestler) =

American professional wrestler (born 1975)

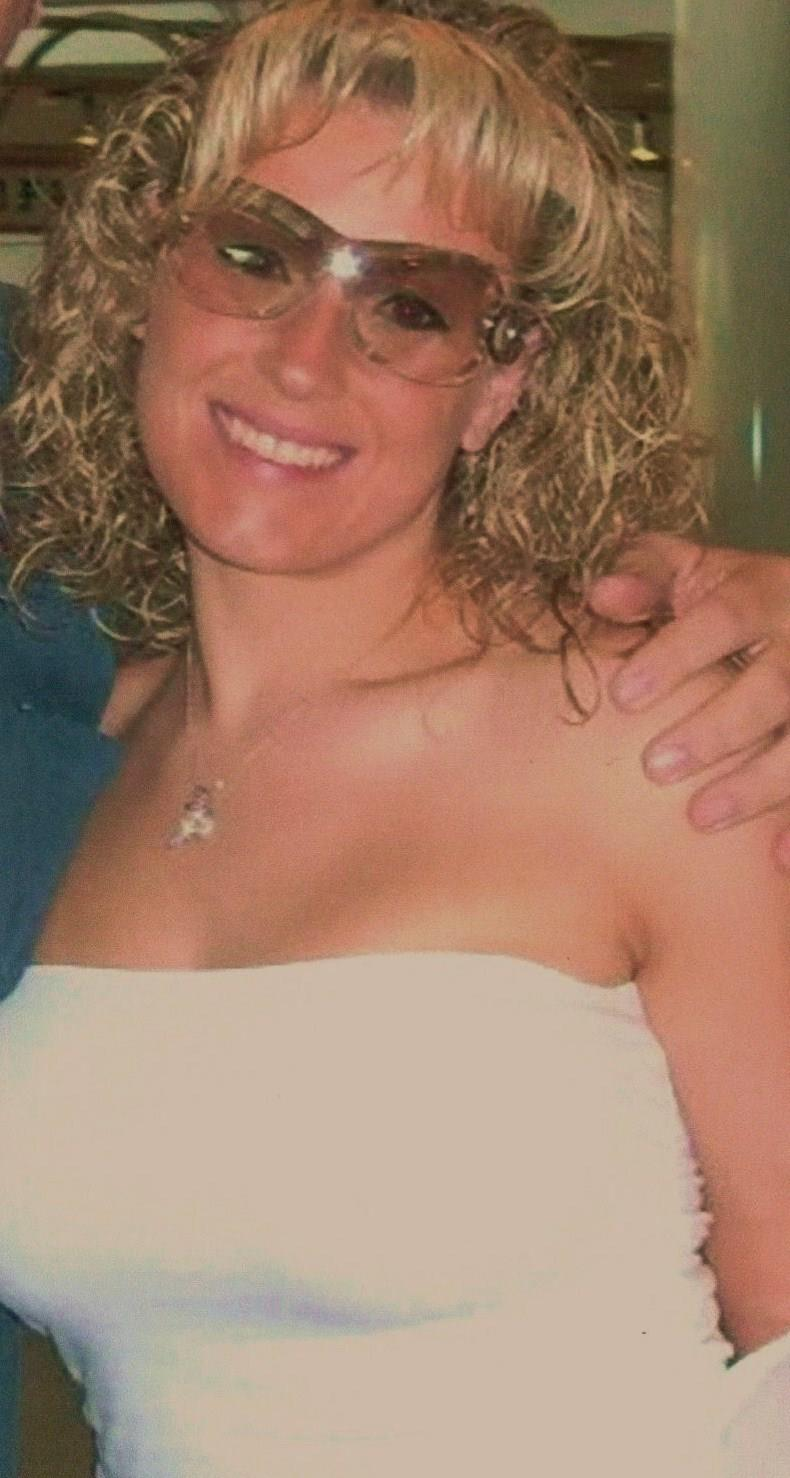
- Cherry in 2008

Personal information
- Born: Kara Elizabeth Drew; July 15, 1975 (age 51) Morristown, New Jersey, U.S.

Professional wrestling career
- Ring name(s): Cherry; Cherry Pie; Kara; Kara Slice
- Billed height: 5 ft 6 in (1.68 m)
- Billed weight: 130 lb (59 kg)
- Billed from: "The Other Side of the Tracks"
- Trained by: East Coast Pro Wrestling; Ohio Valley Wrestling; Gino Caruso
- Debut: January 1999

Kara Elizabeth Drew (born July 15, 1975) is an American valet and professional wrestler, better known under the ring name Cherry. She is best known for her tenure in World Wrestling Entertainment (WWE), as the manager of former Tag Team Champions Deuce 'n Domino.

After becoming interested in wrestling, Drew worked on the independent circuit under the ring names Miss Kara and Kara Slice. She was assigned to WWE's developmental territory Ohio Valley Wrestling (OVW) in Louisville, Kentucky in 2005, to continue her wrestling training. While situated at OVW, she used the name Cherry Pie, and she was the manager of the group known as "The Throw-Backs" and later as "The Untouchables", consisting of Deuce Shade and Dice Domino. Cherry managed them to three reigns as OVW Southern Tag Team Champions.

After signing with WWE, the group were called up to the SmackDown! roster in January 2007, where the team underwent a name change to Deuce 'n Domino. Cherry managed the team to one reign as WWE Tag Team Champions. In April 2008, she made her WWE singles debut and parted ways with Deuce and Domino the following month. She continued working in singles and tag team competition, before being released from her WWE contract in August 2008.

== Professional wrestling career ==
=== Early career (1999–2005) ===
Drew grew up in Morristown, New Jersey. She became a fan of professional wrestling after watching the first WrestleMania event in 1985. Her favorite wrestlers included Miss Elizabeth and Macho Man Randy Savage. Drew never thought she would get the opportunity to become a professional wrestler, but one of her co-workers was related to the founder and promoter of Stars and Stripes Championship Wrestling based in Nutley, New Jersey, where she debuted under the ring name Miss Kara.

She was invited to attend Independent Wrestling Federation (IWF) shows by Kevin Knight and received an "up close and personal" look from a "behind the scenes" perspective. In January 1999, Drew began working as a manager in IWF. She worked as a manager and an occasional wrestler in various federations on the East Coast, including East Coast Pro Wrestling (ECPW), the National Wrestling Alliance in New Jersey, ISPW, State-Side Championship Wrestling and Northeast Wrestling.

In 2002, she worked for National Wrestling Superstars, and later with Phoenix Championship Wrestling, where she feuded with Alexis Laree. By 2003, she was working primarily as a singles competitor. She wrestled in various independent promotions until September 2005. The same year, Drew started wrestling for Ohio Valley Wrestling (OVW), the developmental territory for World Wrestling Entertainment (WWE), and relocated to Louisville, Kentucky.

=== World Wrestling Entertainment ===
==== Ohio Valley Wrestling (2005–2007) ====
In late 2005, Drew began working for OVW. She eventually signed a developmental contract with WWE in January 2006.

Drew used the ring name "Cherry Pie" and was the manager of the tag team The Throw-Backs, comprising Deuce Shade and Dice Domino, the latter of whom was her storyline brother, in OVW. She became part of their 1950s in-ring persona, wearing poodle skirts and roller skates and chewing gum at all times.

In mid-2006, during their time together, the team underwent an image change, including changing their name to "The Untouchables" and dropping Pie, Dice, and Shade from their respective names. In late 2006, the team of Shawn Spears and Cody Runnels defeated The Untouchables in a tag team match and won the services of Cherry. Cherry accompanied Spears and Runnels to ringside, and soon Spears began to have a crush on her, which began interfering in their matches. Cherry betrayed Spears and Runnels, however, and helped Deuce and Domino win the OVW Southern Tag Team Championship. In January 2007, Cherry twice challenged Katie Lea for the OVW Women's Championship unsuccessfully.

==== SmackDown! (2007–2008) ====
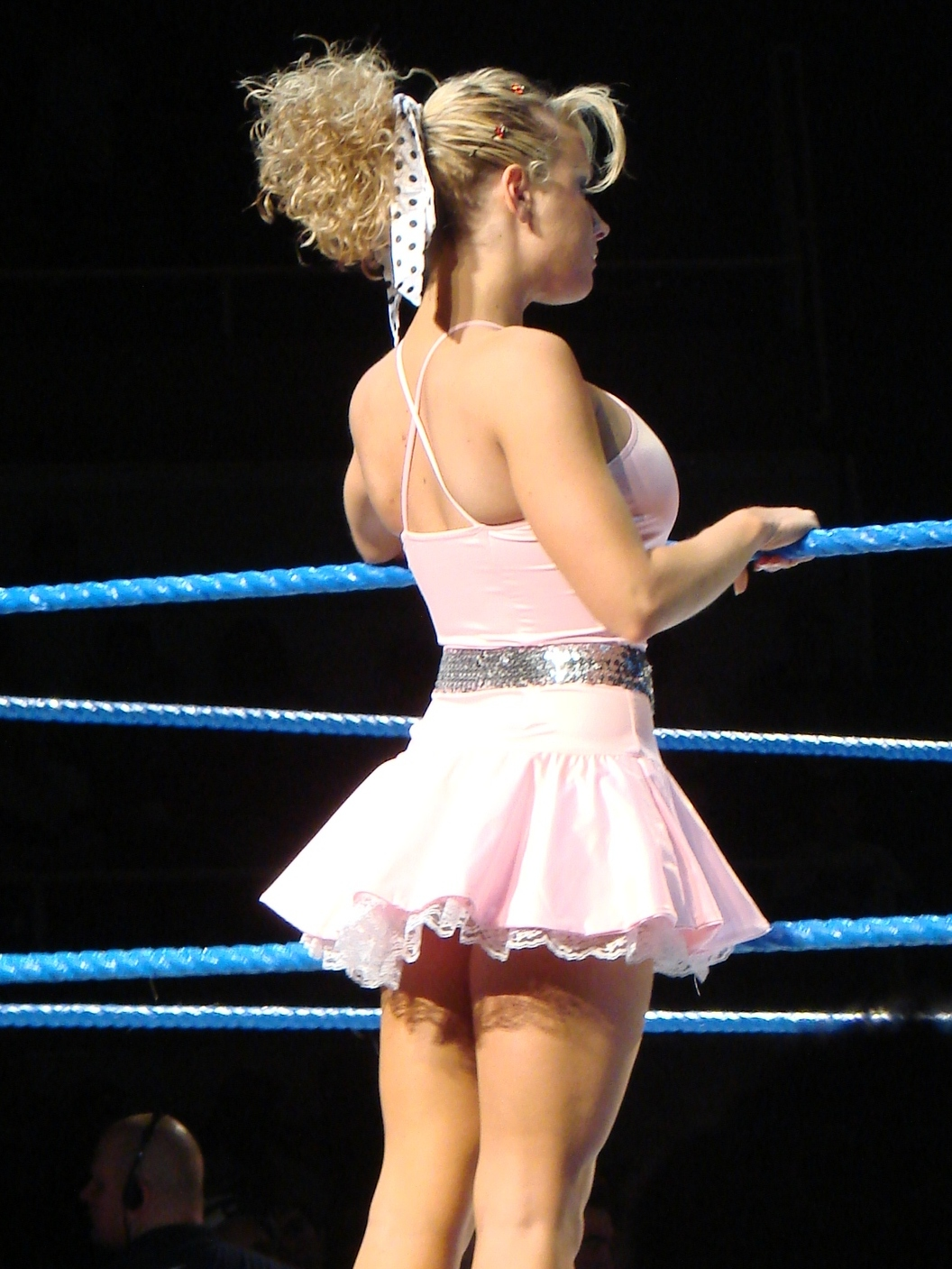
Cherry during a house show in February 2007

For their first match with WWE, where they debuted on the SmackDown! brand, the team underwent a name change to "Deuce 'n Domino". They debuted on the January 19, 2007, episode, where she managed Deuce 'n Domino in a tag team match, which Deuce 'n Domino won. During this time that Cherry was rarely physically involved in their matches. On the April 20 episode of SmackDown!, Cherry was in the corner of Deuce 'n Domino when they won the WWE Tag Team Championship by defeating Paul London and Brian Kendrick.

On the October 12 episode of SmackDown!, in a backstage segment, Jamie Noble revealed to Deuce and Domino that he had heard Jimmy Wang Yang making suggestive comments about Cherry. Later that episode, Yang defeated Deuce in a singles match. After the match, however, Deuce 'n Domino double-teamed him, and Cherry slapped Yang. This later developed into a feud between Deuce and Domino, and Yang and his partner, Shannon Moore. At the beginning of 2008, the team suffered a series of losses.

On the March 7, 2008, episode of SmackDown, Cherry competed in a Swimsuit Contest, along Maryse, Victoria, Eve Torres, and Michelle McCool. On the March 28 episode of SmackDown, Cherry transformed into a fan favorite by teaming with McCool to defeat Victoria and Maryse. She made her WWE singles match debut defeating Victoria with a roll-up, following a distraction from McCool, on the April 18 episode of SmackDown. On April 27, at the Backlash pay-per-view, Cherry made her pay-per-view debut in a 12-Diva tag team match, which her team lost.

In a video posted to WWE's official website, she was dumped by Deuce and Domino for Maryse when they announced that they wanted nothing more to do with her after her unannounced departure from them. Maryse proceeded to provoke Cherry after their announcement, only to get slapped for her troubles. She went on to pick up a singles victory over Maryse. Cherry then went on into a minor feud with Natalya, who debuted with a win over Cherry via the Sharpshooter, a submission move. Over the following weeks, Natalya continued to defeat Cherry, including at Vickie Guerrero's wedding. As a condition of catching Guererro's bouquet, Cherry won a match against Guerrero, but first had to face Natalya, who defeated her with the Sharpshooter. Following this loss, Guererro immediately had a match with Cherry, quickly pinning her for the victory. Cherry was released from her WWE contract on August 15, 2008.

=== Return to independent circuit (2008–present) ===
After being released from World Wrestling Entertainment, Drew returned to the independent circuit. She began wrestling with Northeast Wrestling under the ring name Cherry Pie. On October 18, 2008, she teamed up with Jerry Lawler and defeated Romeo Roselli and Velvet Sky in a mixed tag team match.

Thirteen years after the separation, Drew along with Treiber and Reiher have reformed the Deuce 'n Domino stable and now accept bookings on the independent circuit.

== Championships and accomplishments ==
- Jersey Championship Wrestling
  - JCW Women's Championship (1 time)
- Women Superstars Uncensored
  - WSU/NWS King and Queen Tournament (2005) – with Julio Dinero
- Pro Wrestling Illustrated
  - Ranked No. 27 of the top 50 female wrestlers in the PWI Female 50 in 2008
