= Bam Neely =

American former professional wrestler (born 1975)

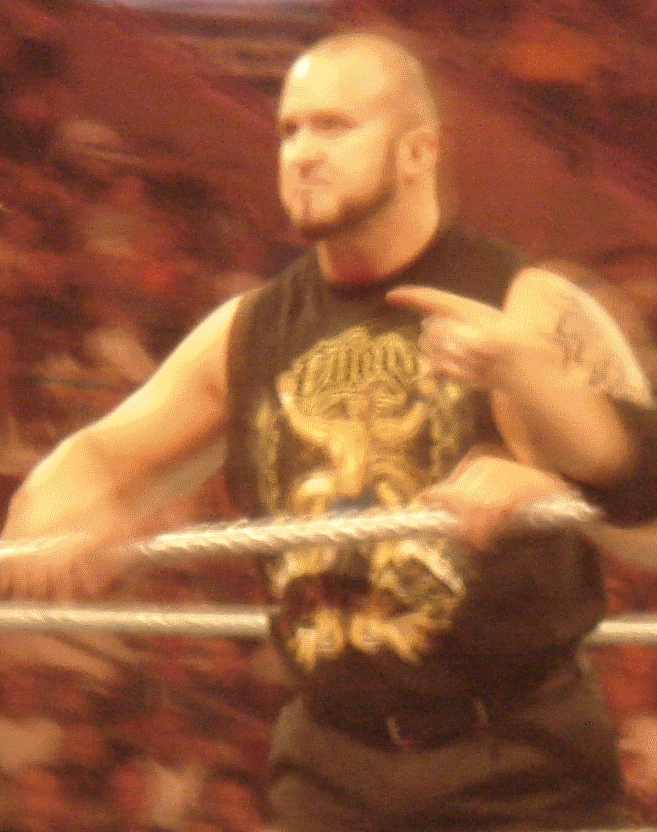
- LaRouche on ECW as Bam Neely

Personal information
- Born: Justin Bruce Rocheleau; June 18, 1975 (age 51) Robbinsdale, Minnesota, U.S.

Professional wrestling career
- Ring name(s): Bam Neely; Hellfire; Hellraiser Gutz; Justin LaRouche; Magnus Maximus
- Billed height: 6 ft 7 in (201 cm)
- Billed weight: 275 lb (125 kg)
- Billed from: Robbinsdale, Minnesota
- Trained by: Richard Martin; Eddie Sharkey
- Debut: 1997
- Retired: 2010

Justin Bruce Rocheleau (born June 18, 1975) is an American former professional wrestler. He is best known for his stint with World Wrestling Entertainment (WWE) on its ECW brand under the ring name Bam Neely.

== Professional wrestling career ==
=== Early career (1997–2007) ===
Rocheleau was trained by Eddie Sharkey initially, and started his career wrestling in the tag team known as the "Hellraisers". He wrestled under the name "Hellraiser Gutz" and was mentored by his uncle Richard Martin, who wrestled as "Hellraiser Blood". They traveled across the United States, winning several tag team championships from the numerous independent promotions around the country and were the main event draw in almost every city that they appeared in for nearly a decade. However, Rocheleau struck out as a singles wrestler due to Martin suffering a career-ending illness. He began wrestling as "Magnus Maximus" in Ed Hellier's Steel Domain Wrestling in 2002.

=== World Wrestling Entertainment (2007–2009) ===
==== Ohio Valley Wrestling (2007–2008) ====
He debuted in WWE's former developmental territory Ohio Valley Wrestling under the name Justin "The Ox" LaRouche, where he won the OVW Southern Tag Team Championships with Charles "The Hammer" Evans. They would lose the titles to the Major Brothers, who became members of La Familia (as the Rated-R Entourage of Curt Hawkins and Zack Ryder), the stable which he would join upon making his WWE debut.

==== ECW (2008–2009) ====
Rocheleau made his WWE television debut on the ECW brand on April 8, 2008 when after Kane and Chavo Guerrero Jr. signed the contract for their ECW Championship rematch at Backlash, LaRouche stormed the ring, aiding Guerrero (as well as Hawkins and Ryder) in beating down Kane and putting him through a table. On the May 5 edition of Raw, the entire ECW roster defeated Triple H and Mr. Kennedy in a handicap match where Guerrero pinned Kennedy.

Rocheleau's character was then revealed to be "Bam Neely", a former border guard who was hired as a bodyguard by Guerrero to help him win back the ECW Championship as well as provide backup for La Familia. He won his ECW in-ring debut by defeating then ECW Champion Kane in a handicap match while teaming with Guerrero. On the May 6 edition of ECW, Neely and Guerrero faced CM Punk & Kane in a losing effort. He had his first singles match on the June 20 edition of SmackDown in a losing effort against Matt Hardy. On the June 23 edition of Raw during the 2008 Draft, Neely and Guerrero faced Hardcore Holly and Cody Rhodes in a losing effort. On the August 5 edition of ECW, Neely and Guerrero were defeated by Evan Bourne and Ricky Ortiz. On the August 8 edition of SmackDown, Neely along with the rest of La Familia were all betrayed by Edge, and on the August 12 edition of ECW, Neely lost to Evan Bourne, with whom Guerrero and Neely had begun a minor feud.

On the September 5 episode of Smackdown, Neely faced R-Truth in a losing effort. On the September 23 episode of ECW, Neely faced Finlay in a losing effort. On the October 24 episode of SmackDown during a non-title tag team match against the reigning Tag Team Champions Primo Colon and Carlito, Guerrero and Neely had some miscommunication which resulted in Guerrero slapping Neely and Neely throwing (and missing) a punch at Guerrero which distracted Neely long enough for Carlito to hit the Backstabber for the victory. This, in addition to earlier storyline issues fostered by inability to beat R-Truth, caused the team to disband.

The following week, on the October 28 episode of ECW, the duo would team one last time, as they and Mark Henry defeated then-ECW Champion Matt Hardy, Evan Bourne, and Finlay. Afterwards, Neely only appeared on television once more in a losing effort to Hardy on the November 4 episode of ECW. Neely returned to FCW on December 18, where he was defeated by DJ Gabriel. His final appearance was on January 8, 2009, teaming with Sheamus O'Shaunessy and Ryan Braddock, they were defeated by Tyler Reks, Ricky Ortiz and Kizarny. He was released from WWE on January 9, 2009.

=== Later career (2009–2010) ===
One year after his release from WWE, Rocheleau competed for Combat Championship Wrestling (CCW). On February 20, 2010, Rocheleau faced Eric Escobar in a match that ended in a no contest. On February 26, Escobar defeated Rocheleau by disqualification. On March 27, Rocheleau faced Steve Lewington in a losing effort. On April 9, Rocheleau and Sinn were defeated by Steve Lewington & Eddie Taurus. On April 23, Rocheleau defeated Eddie Taurus. On May 1, Rocheleau defeated Adam Pearce to win the vacant SDW Heavyweight Championship. He would go on and hold the title two more times. On June 25, Rocheleau competed for the CCW heavyweight championship in a three way match which was won by Marquis Youngston. On July 30, Rocheleau lost to Kennedy Kendrick by countout.

== Championships and accomplishments ==
- Ohio Valley Wrestling
  - OVW Southern Tag Team Championship (1 time) - with Charles Evans
- Pro Wrestling Illustrated
  - Ranked No. 296 of the top 500 singles wrestlers in the PWI 500 in 2008
- Steel Domain Wrestling
  - SDW Heavyweight Championship (3 times)
  - SDW Television Championship (1 time)
  - SDW Tag Team Championship (5 times)
