= Unforgiven (2008) =

World Wrestling Entertainment pay-per-view event

- Promotional poster featuring Batista, parodying the movie The Shawshank Redemption.
- Promotion: World Wrestling Entertainment
- Brand(s): Raw; SmackDown; ECW
- Date: September 7, 2008
- City: Cleveland, Ohio
- Venue: Quicken Loans Arena
- Attendance: 8,707
- Buy rate: 211,000

Pay-per-view chronology
← Previous; SummerSlam	Next → No Mercy

Unforgiven chronology
← Previous; 2007	Next → Final

The 2008 Unforgiven was a professional wrestling pay-per-view (PPV) event produced by World Wrestling Entertainment (WWE). It was the 11th annual and final Unforgiven and took place on September 7, 2008, at the Quicken Loans Arena in Cleveland, Ohio, held for wrestlers from the promotion's Raw, SmackDown, and ECW brand divisions. Another Unforgiven was planned for 2009, but it was replaced by Breaking Point.

Seven professional wrestling matches were scheduled on the event's card, which featured a supercard. The three brands, Raw, SmackDown, and ECW, were all represented by their respective Championship Scramble match – a 20-minute time limit bout, during which participants can become the temporary champion via pinfall or submission. The main event of the pay-per-view was the Championship Scramble from the Raw brand. It was originally scheduled to feature CM Punk defending his title as World Heavyweight Champion; he was replaced by Chris Jericho after Randy Orton attacked Punk. Jericho won the match and became the new World Heavyweight Champion. The Championship Scramble from the ECW brand featured Mark Henry defending the ECW Championship, losing the match and title to Matt Hardy. The SmackDown brand's Championship Scramble saw Triple H defeat the other competitors to retain his WWE Championship. Another featured match on the undercard was an unsanctioned match, or hardcore match, in which Shawn Michaels defeated Chris Jericho.

The event marked the first time the Championship Scramble format was used by WWE. The event had an attendance of 8,707. The event received 211,000 pay-per-view buys, more than the previous year's event. When the event was released on DVD, it reached a peak position of second on Billboard's DVD sales chart. It was also the first and only Unforgiven PPV broadcast in high definition.

== Production ==
=== Background ===
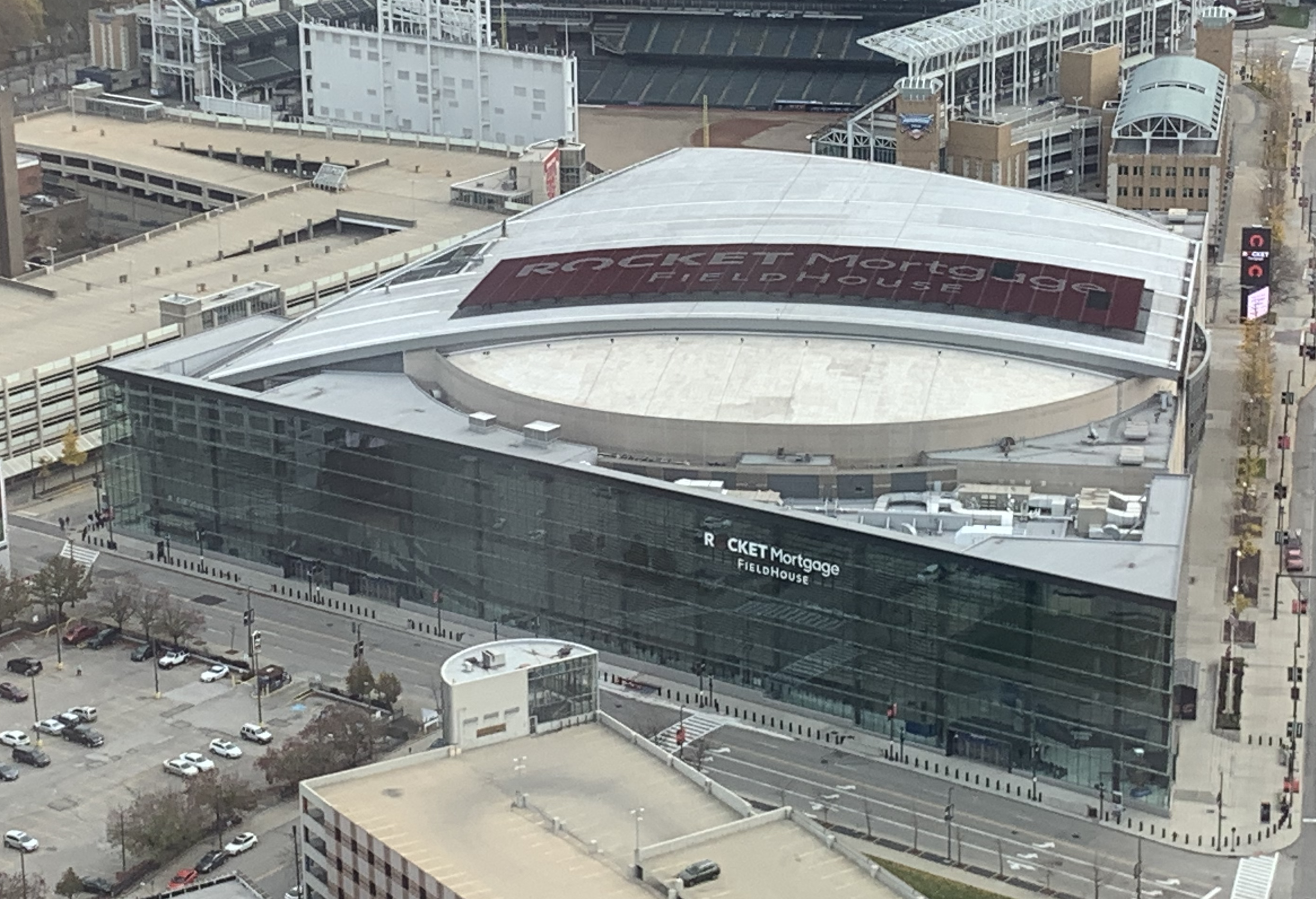
The 11th annual Unforgiven was held at the Quicken Loans Arena in Cleveland, Ohio.

Unforgiven was an annual professional wrestling pay-per-view (PPV) event first held by World Wrestling Entertainment (WWE) as the 21st In Your House PPV event in April 1998. Following the discontinuation of the In Your House series in February 1999, Unforgiven continued as its own PPV event in September that year, becoming WWE's annual September PPV. The 11th event took place on September 7, 2008, at the Quicken Loans Arena in Cleveland, Ohio and featured wrestlers from the Raw, SmackDown, and ECW brands.

=== Storylines ===
The event featured seven professional wrestling matches with outcomes predetermined by WWE script writers. The matches featured wrestlers portraying their characters in planned storylines that took place before, during, and after the event. All wrestlers were from one of WWE's brands – SmackDown, Raw, or ECW – the three storyline divisions in which WWE assigned its employees. The event also marked the first time that the Championship Scramble format was used by WWE.

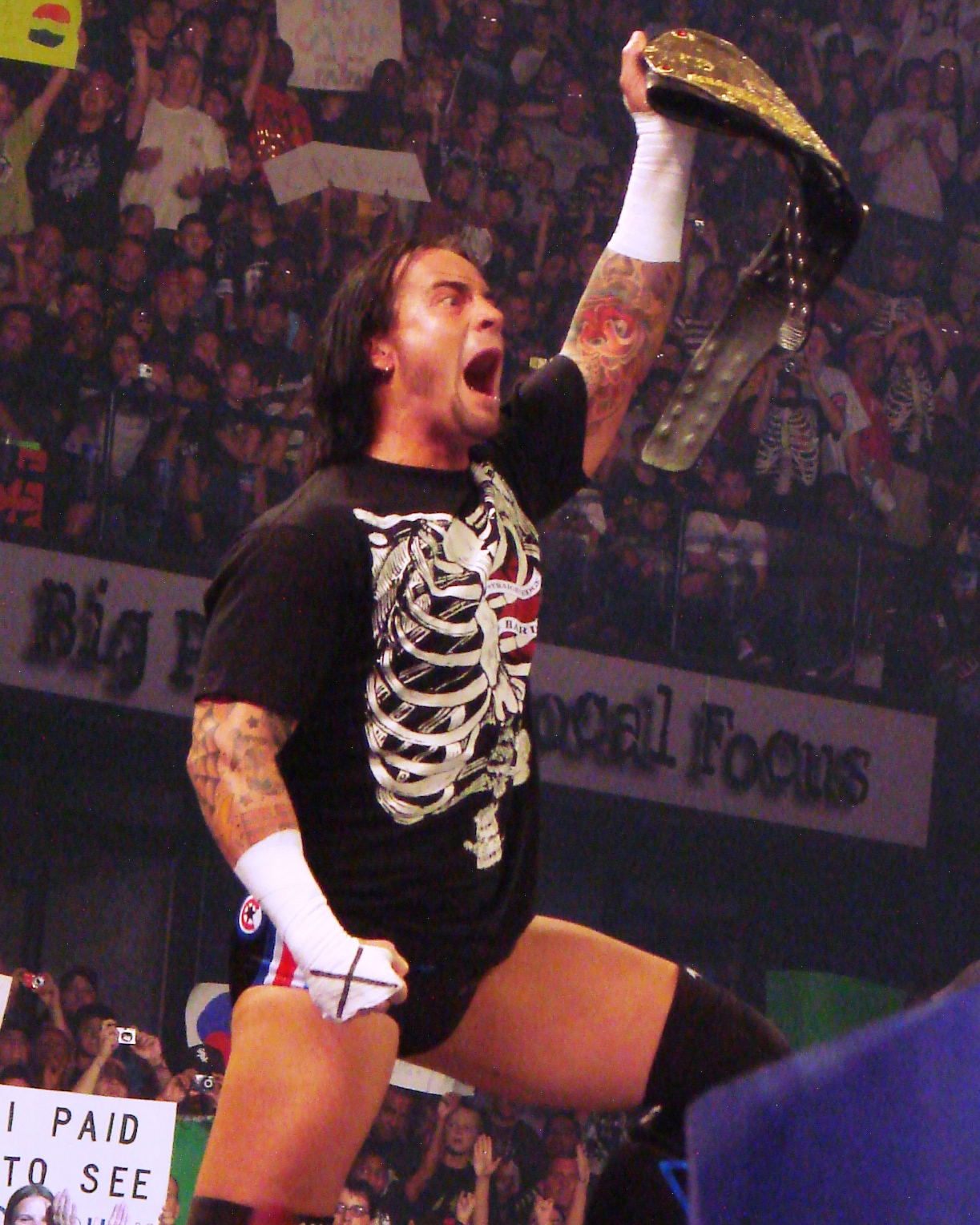
CM Punk as Raw's World Heavyweight Champion; he was originally scheduled to defend his title at the event but was attacked before the match and was (in kayfabe) unable to compete

Wrestlers from Raw were featured in the main event at Unforgiven: a Championship Scramble match, a 20 minute time limit bout, during which participants enter at five-minute intervals and can become the temporary champion via pinfall or submission. The match was contested for the World Heavyweight Championship, and was originally scheduled to be CM Punk defending the title against John "Bradshaw" Layfield (JBL), Batista, Rey Mysterio, and Kane. During the event, however, Randy Orton attacked Punk and he was replaced in the match by Chris Jericho. The build up to the match began on the August 18 episode of Raw, when Raw general manager Mike Adamle, who portrays an on screen authority figure, announced the match and its rules, stating that JBL, Batista, John Cena, Kane, and World Heavyweight Champion Punk would participate. The following week on Raw, Adamle announced that Cena had been injured after his match against Batista at SummerSlam, and would be unable to compete in the Championship Scramble. Adamle then announced Mysterio as Cena's replacement. On the September 1 episode of Raw, a preview of the Championship Scramble match was featured, in which the five men fighting in the Championship Scramble competed in a traditional battle royal, which Kane won.

The other predominant match from Raw was an unsanctioned match between Shawn Michaels and Chris Jericho. At SummerSlam, Michaels came to the ring to announce his retirement. However, Jericho interrupted the announcement and, in an attempt to punch Michaels, accidentally struck Michaels' wife Rebecca. On the August 18 episode of Raw, Jericho stated that he had no remorse for punching Michaels wife, claiming that Michaels "had it coming". The next week on Raw, Michaels announced he would not retire and asked Jericho for an unsanctioned match, which Jericho accepted. The following week on Raw a contract was signed for the match. The signing ended with both men attacking each other.

The predominant match from SmackDown was a Championship Scramble for the WWE Championship, in which title holder Triple H faced Jeff Hardy, The Brian Kendrick, Shelton Benjamin, and Montel Vontavious Porter (MVP). On the August 22 episode of SmackDown, General Manager Vickie Guerrero announced that SmackDown would have a Championship Scramble match and that the competitors would include WWE Champion Triple H and four men to be decided later in the night through a series of qualifying matches. The first qualifying match was a ten man battle royal, which saw The Big Show disrupt the match and throw all the competitors over the top rope. The Brian Kendrick, however, was saved by his bodyguard, Ezekiel Jackson, who caught Kendrick and put him back in the ring after the Big Show had eliminated all other competitors. Thus, Kendrick qualified for the Championship Scramble. The second qualifying match saw MVP defeat Festus by count out, qualifying for the match. The third qualifying match was Shelton Benjamin versus Finlay, which Benjamin won. The final qualifying match was Jeff Hardy versus The Great Khali, which Hardy won.

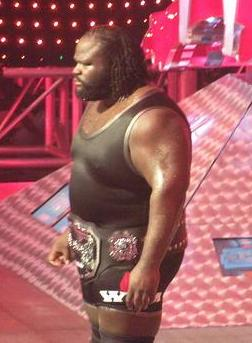
Mark Henry as ECW Champion.

The predominant match from ECW was a third Championship Scramble, in which Mark Henry defended against Matt Hardy, The Miz, Chavo Guerrero, and Finlay. On the August 26 episode of ECW, General Manager Theodore Long announced that the ECW Championship would be defended in a Championship Scramble and that there would be qualifying matches that night to determine the participants. The first qualifying match saw Matt Hardy defeat John Morrison to qualify. In the second match, The Miz defeated Evan Bourne to qualify. The third qualifying match saw Chavo Guerrero defeat Tommy Dreamer to qualify, and the fourth match was Finlay versus Mike Knox, which Finlay won. On the September 1 episode of Raw, there was a preview of the Championship Scramble, in which the five participants took part in a traditional battle royal. The winner was ECW Champion Mark Henry.

== Event ==
Other on-screen personnel
Role:	Name:
English commentators	Michael Cole (Raw)
English commentators	Jerry Lawler (Raw)
English commentators	Jim Ross (SmackDown)
English commentators	Tazz (SmackDown)
English commentators	Todd Grisham (ECW)
English commentators	Matt Striker (ECW)
Spanish commentators	Carlos Cabrera
Spanish commentators	Hugo Savinovich
Backstage interviewers	Eve Torres
Backstage interviewers	Todd Grisham
Ring announcers	Lilian Garcia (Raw)
Ring announcers	Justin Roberts (SmackDown)
Ring announcers	Tony Chimel (ECW)
Referees	Charles Robinson
Referees	John Cone
Referees	Mike Chioda
Referees	Scott Armstrong
Referees	Mike Posey
Referees	Marty Elias

Before the event aired live on pay-per-view, a dark match was featured in which Evan Bourne defeated John Morrison with a shooting star press.

=== Preliminary matches ===
The pay-per-view event began with Mark Henry defending the ECW Championship in the ECW Championship Scramble against Matt Hardy, The Miz, Chavo Guerrero, and Finlay. The match began with The Miz and Matt Hardy, who performed a variety of wrestling maneuvers including The Miz performing the "Reality Check". After the first five minutes had passed, Chavo Guerrero entered the ring and quickly performed a body splash on Hardy and covered him for a pinfall, making him the interim champion. Guerrero continued with a variety of offensive maneuvers until Matt Hardy performed a Side Effect on Guerrero and covered him for a pinfall, making him the temporary champion. After the next five minutes had passed, Mark Henry entered the ring. The other three men attacked him, but Henry overpowered them and performed the World's Strongest Slam on Chavo Guerrero, covering him and scoring a pinfall to become the interim champion. After the next series of five minutes had passed, Finlay entered the ring. He attacked Henry and his storyline son Hornswoggle distracted Henry, allowing Finlay to strike him with a shillelagh, followed by a Celtic Cross on Hardy to become temporary champion. The match continued until Matt Hardy performed a Twist of Fate on The Miz. He covered The Miz and became the interim champion. Hardy continued to break up pinfall attempts until the end of the 20-minute time limit, at which time Hardy officially won the ECW Championship.

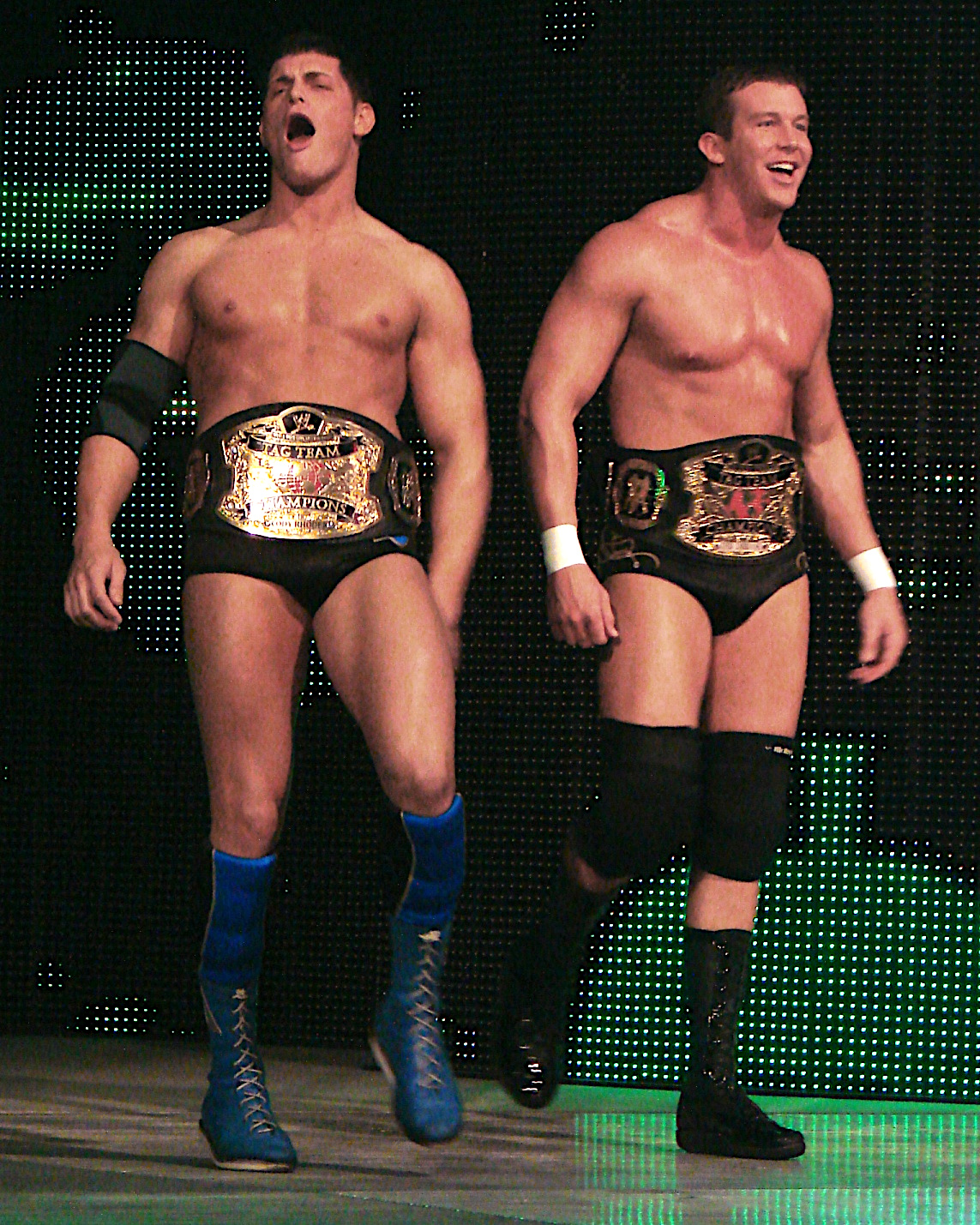
Cody Rhodes and Ted DiBiase as Raw's World Tag Team Champions

In the next match, Cody Rhodes and Ted DiBiase defended the World Tag Team Championship against Cryme Tyme (Shad Gaspard and JTG). The match began with Cryme Tyme in control, and Shad threw JTG over the top rope onto Rhodes and DiBiase. Rhodes and DiBiase, however, isolated JTG in their corner and performed a number of offensive maneuvers on him. Rhodes attempted a moonsault onto JTG, but missed, allowing JTG to tag in Shad at the same time Rhodes tagged in DiBiase. Shad performed a back body drop on DiBiase, but while the referee was distracted, Rhodes performed a DDT on Shad. DiBiase attempted to cover Shad, but was forced to break the cover as Shad placed his foot on the bottom rope. JTG attempted an inside cradle pin on Rhodes, but Shad accidentally pushed DiBiase on Rhodes, reversing the pinfall attempt so that Rhodes scored the pin over JTG, retaining his and DiBiase's titles in the process.

In the third match, Shawn Michaels and Chris Jericho fought in an unsanctioned match. The match also saw Lance Cade interfere on Jericho's behalf, but Michaels ultimately gained the advantage over both men, leading to him placing both men on an announcer's table and performing a Diving Elbow Drop through the table. After returning Jericho to the ring, Michaels continued to attack Jericho. He then took off his belt and repeatedly whipped Chris Jericho with it. The referee ended the match when he determined that Jericho could no longer defend himself against Michaels, making Michaels the victor by referee stoppage.

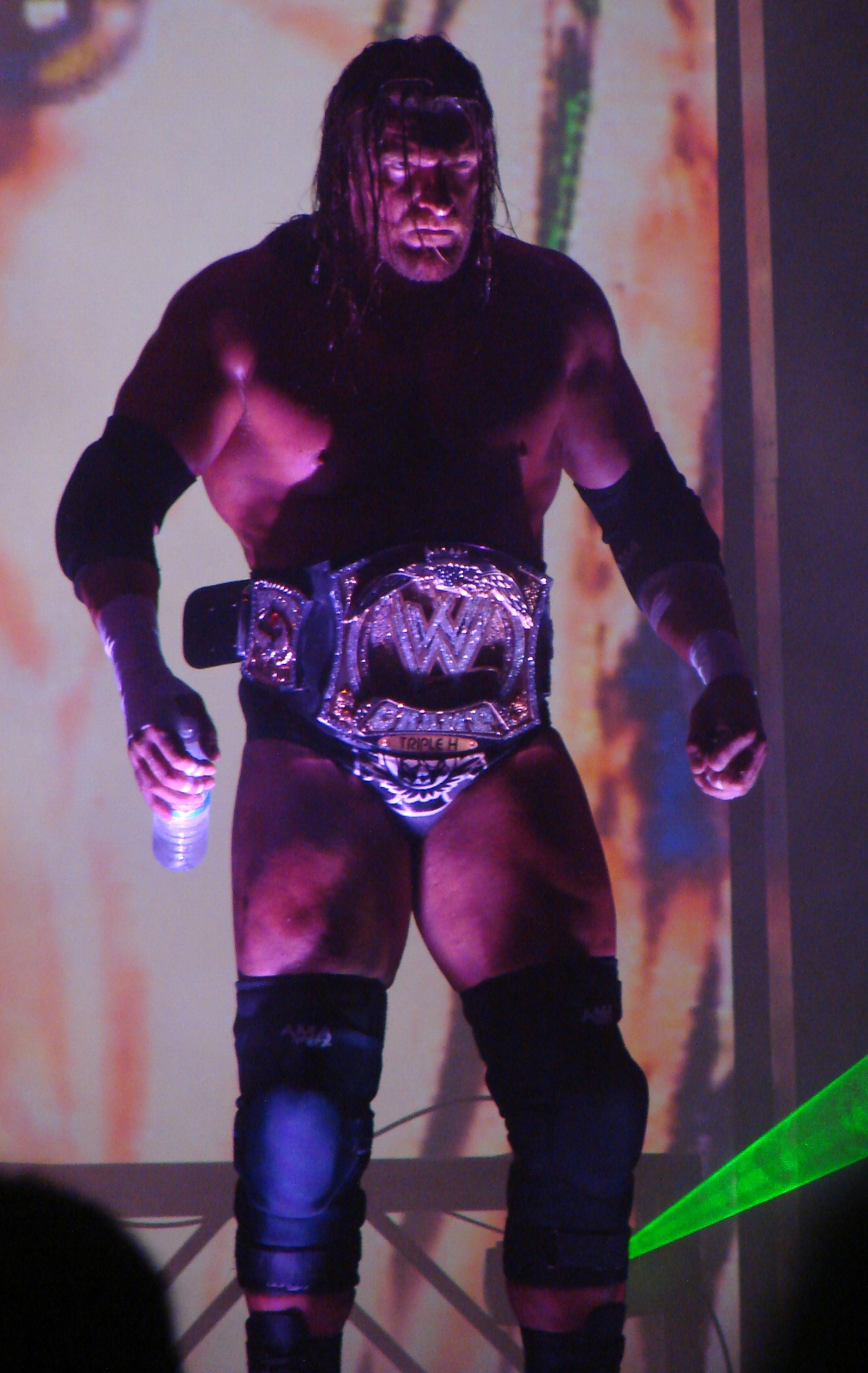
Triple H, who defended SmackDown's WWE Championship in a Championship Scramble

Next, Triple H defended the WWE Championship in a Championship Scramble against Jeff Hardy, The Brian Kendrick, Shelton Benjamin, and Montel Vontavious Porter (MVP). The match began with Jeff Hardy and Shelton Benjamin, with both men wrestling inconclusively until the first five-minute interval had passed, and Brian Kendrick entered the match. Soon after his entrance, Hardy performed a reverse powerbomb on Benjamin, covering him and scoring a pinfall to become the interim WWE Champion. Later, Kendrick performed The Kendrick on Hardy and covered him for a pinfall, becoming the temporary WWE Champion. Shortly after, the second five-minute interval expired and MVP entered the match. All four men in the match continued to fight, with no pinfalls being scored until the third five-minute interval expired, at which point Triple H entered the match. Soon after his entrance, he performed a spinebuster, followed by a Pedigree on Kendrick, pinning him to become the interim champion. Hardy returned to the ring and performed a Twist of Fate on MVP, pinning him to become the temporary champion. After disrupting Hardy's attempt to perform a maneuver off the top turnbuckle, Triple H performed a Pedigree on Kendrick to become interim champion again. Shortly after, however, Hardy performed a Swanton Bomb on Kendrick and again became temporary champion after a cover. At the end, Triple H performed a Pedigree on MVP and Hardy performing a Swanton Bomb on Benjamin; however, Triple H covered MVP faster and scored the pinfall with one second remaining on the clock. The time limit expired and Triple H retained the WWE Championship.

A backstage segment occurred where CM Punk was interviewed regarding his title defense in the Championship Scramble later in the evening. Randy Orton interrupted the interview, and as he spoke with Punk, Cody Rhodes, Ted DiBiase, and Manu attacked Punk. Kofi Kingston tried to help Punk. After they had attacked both Punk and Kingston, Orton used his chance to perform a running punt on Punk.

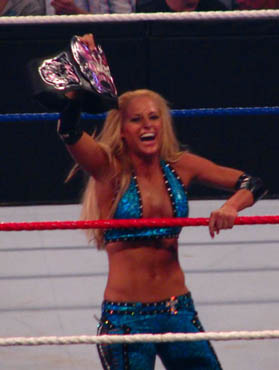
Michelle McCool, who defended SmackDown's WWE Divas Championship against Maryse

The fifth contest was a standard match in which Michelle McCool defended her WWE Divas Champion title against Maryse. Maryse began the match attacking McCool's knee, but McCool soon countered by grabbing Maryse's foot and twisting it, a submission hold called a heel hook. Maryse, however, reached the ropes and caused McCool to break the hold. Later in the match, McCool performed the Wings of Love and covered Maryse to retain her championship.

After the match, an in ring segment took place in which Big Show, entered the ring and asked the crowd whether they thought he should have been in the Championship Scramble for the WWE Championship. SmackDown general manager Vickie Guerrero, who portrays an on-screen authority figure for the SmackDown brand, then came to the ring and proceeded to insult the Big Show, and demanded that he leave the ring. Druids then came to the ring bringing a casket, and The Undertaker appeared on the TitanTron, telling Guerrero to either get in the casket herself or he would put her in it. Guerrero refused to enter the casket voluntarily, so The Undertaker began to come to ringside. The Big Show held back Guerrero as The Undertaker came to the ring. Once he was in the ring, The Undertaker began to choke Guerrero, but the Big Show turned heel, becoming a villainous character, by striking The Undertaker and freeing Guerrero. He proceeded to attack The Undertaker, and restrained him to allow Guerrero to slap him and spit in his face.

The main event was a Championship Scramble for the World Heavyweight Championship. CM Punk was originally scheduled to defend the World Heavyweight Title against John "Bradshaw" Layfield (JBL), Batista, Rey Mysterio, and Kane. However, due to the attack on CM Punk earlier in the night by Randy Orton, Punk was unable to compete and was replaced by Chris Jericho (this information was not revealed until the final five minutes of the match, at which point Chris Jericho entered in place of CM Punk). Batista and JBL began the match, performing a variety of offensive maneuvers until the first five-minute interval had passed, and Kane entered the match. Later, JBL attempted to strike Kane with his forearm, a move JBL calls a "Clothesline from Hell", but was caught by Kane. Kane then chokeslammed JBL and covered him for a pinfall, becoming the interim champion. Soon after, the second five-minute interval expired and Rey Mysterio entered the match. The match continued for several minutes, until the final five-minute interval expired and Jericho (nearly immobile after his match with Shawn Michaels) entered the match as a replacement for CM Punk, shocking everyone. Soon after Jericho's entrance, Batista performed a spinebuster on Kane, covering him for a pinfall and becoming temporary champion. Batista was left as the only man standing until Jericho returned to the ring and covered the already downed Kane, scoring a pinfall and becoming interim champion. The time limit expired soon after, and Jericho won the World Heavyweight Championship.

== Reception ==
Despite the event's promotional build-up, only a reported 6,000 tickets were initially sold for an arena that holds 20,000 people. To fill the arena, local radio stations gave away tickets to the show. The event had a final attendance of 8,707. Canadian Online Explorer's professional wrestling section rated the entire event a 7 out of 10 stars. The rating was higher than the Unforgiven event in 2007, which was rated a 5.5 out of 10 stars. The Championship Scramble main event match from the Raw brand was rated a 6.5 out of 10 stars, while the SmackDown brand's main event, a Championship Scramble for the WWE Championship, was rated an 8 out of 10 stars.

The event was released on DVD on October 7, 2008 by Sony Music Entertainment. The DVD reached second on Billboard's DVD Sales Chart for recreational sports during the week of November 1, 2008, although it fell off the chart thereafter.

== Aftermath ==
=== Raw ===
On the September 8 episode of Raw, it was announced that CM Punk would challenge Chris Jericho in an attempt to win back the World Heavyweight Championship, with the two fighting in a Steel Cage match the following week. On the following week's Raw, Jericho escaped the cage before Punk, and thus retained his championship. Later that night, General Manager Mike Adamle announced that Batista would face JBL in a number one contender's match at No Mercy. Following this announcement, Shawn Michaels announced that he would be facing Jericho in a ladder match for the World Heavyweight Championship at No Mercy. Two weeks later on the September 29 episode of Raw, Jericho and Lance Cade faced a reunited D-Generation X (Michaels and Triple H) in a tag team match, which D-Generation X won via disqualification. At No Mercy, Batista defeated JBL to become number one contender for the World Heavyweight Championship, and Jericho defeated Michaels to retain the World Heavyweight Championship.

Almost two and a half years later at the 2011 Royal Rumble, CM Punk prevented Randy Orton from winning the WWE Championship from The Miz. Eventually Punk revealed that he did this to get revenge on Orton for costing him the championship at Unforgiven in 2008.

=== SmackDown ===
On the September 12 episode of SmackDown, a fatal four-way match was held between Jeff Hardy, The Brian Kendrick, Shelton Benjamin, and MVP, with the stipulation that the winner would go on to face Triple H at No Mercy for the WWE Championship. Hardy won the match and earned a title match at No Mercy. At No Mercy, Triple H defeated Hardy to retain his championship.

=== ECW ===
On the September 16 episode of ECW, it was announced that Matt Hardy would defend the ECW Championship against Mark Henry at No Mercy. At No Mercy, Hardy defeated Henry to retain his championship.

=== Future ===
The 2008 Unforgiven would be the final Unforgiven event. Another Unforgiven was planned to be held in September 2009, but it got replaced by Breaking Point.

== Results ==
No.	Results	Stipulations	Times
1^{D}	Evan Bourne defeated John Morrison by pinfall	Singles match	—
2	Matt Hardy defeated Chavo Guerrero, Finlay, Mark Henry (c), and The Miz	Championship Scramble for the ECW Championship	20:00
3	Cody Rhodes and Ted DiBiase (c) defeated Cryme Tyme (JTG and Shad Gaspard) by pinfall	Tag team match for the World Tag Team Championship	11:35
4	Shawn Michaels defeated Chris Jericho by technical knockout	Unsanctioned match	26:53
5	Triple H (c) defeated The Brian Kendrick, Jeff Hardy, Montel Vontavious Porter, and Shelton Benjamin	Championship Scramble for the WWE Championship	20:00
6	Michelle McCool (c) defeated Maryse by pinfall	Singles match for the WWE Divas Championship	5:42
7	Chris Jericho defeated Batista, Kane, John "Bradshaw" Layfield, and Rey Mysterio	Championship Scramble for the vacant World Heavyweight Championship	20:00
(c) / – the champion(s) heading into the match; D / – this was a dark match

=== ECW Championship Scramble Interim Champions ===
Number	Wrestler	Entered	Pinned	Method	Times
1	Chavo Guerrero	3	Matt Hardy	Frog Splash	5:27
2	Matt Hardy	1	Chavo Guerrero	Side Effect	8:49
3	Mark Henry	4	Chavo Guerrero	World's Strongest Slam	11:47
4	Finlay	5	Matt Hardy	Celtic Cross	16:20
Winner	Matt Hardy	1	The Miz	Twist of Fate	16:50

=== WWE Championship Scramble Interim Champions ===
Number	Wrestler	Entered	Pinned	Method	Times
1	Jeff Hardy	1	The Brian Kendrick	Powerbomb	
2	The Brian Kendrick	3	Jeff Hardy	The Kendrick	
3	Triple H	5	The Brian Kendrick	Pedigree	
4	Jeff Hardy	1	MVP	Twist of Fate	
5	Triple H	5	The Brian Kendrick	Pedigree	
6	Jeff Hardy	1	The Brian Kendrick	Swanton Bomb	
Winner	Triple H	5	MVP	Pedigree	

=== World Heavyweight Championship Scramble Interim Champions ===
Number	Wrestler	Entered	Pinned	Method	Times
1	Kane	3	JBL	Chokeslam	
2	Batista	1	Kane	Spinebuster	
Winner	Chris Jericho	5	Kane	Covered Kane after Batista's Spinebuster	
