= Backlash (2008) =

World Wrestling Entertainment pay-per-view event

- Promotional poster featuring The Undertaker
- Promotion: World Wrestling Entertainment
- Brand(s): Raw; SmackDown; ECW
- Date: April 27, 2008
- City: Baltimore, Maryland
- Venue: 1st Mariner Arena
- Attendance: 11,277
- Buy rate: 200,000
- Tagline: Every Action Deserves a Fierce and Aggressive Reaction

Pay-per-view chronology
← Previous; WrestleMania XXIV	Next → Judgment Day

Backlash chronology
← Previous; 2007	Next → 2009

The 2008 Backlash was a professional wrestling pay-per-view (PPV) event produced by World Wrestling Entertainment (WWE). It was the 10th annual Backlash and took place on April 27, 2008, at the 1st Mariner Arena in Baltimore, Maryland, held for wrestlers from the promotion's Raw, SmackDown, and ECW brand divisions. The concept of the event was based around the backlash from WrestleMania XXIV.

Eight professional wrestling matches were scheduled on the event's card, which featured a supercard, a scheduling of more than one main event. The first was a fatal four-way elimination match for Raw's WWE Championship, in which all four men fought in the ring at the same time, with competitors being eliminated by pinfall or submission. Triple H defeated defending champion Randy Orton, John Cena, and John "Bradshaw" Layfield (JBL) to win the championship. The other main event was for the SmackDown brand, in which defending World Heavyweight Champion The Undertaker defeated challenger Edge in a standard wrestling match, also known as a singles match. The main event from the ECW brand was a standard match in which defending ECW Champion Kane defeated challenger Chavo Guerrero. In addition, a featured bout was scheduled on the undercard, in which Shawn Michaels defeated Batista in a standard match.

Backlash had an attendance of approximately 11,277 and received 200,000 buys, less than the previous year's event. When the event was released on DVD, it reached a peak position of second on Billboard's Recreational Sports DVD Sales Chart. It was also the first Backlash PPV broadcast in high definition.

== Production ==
=== Background ===
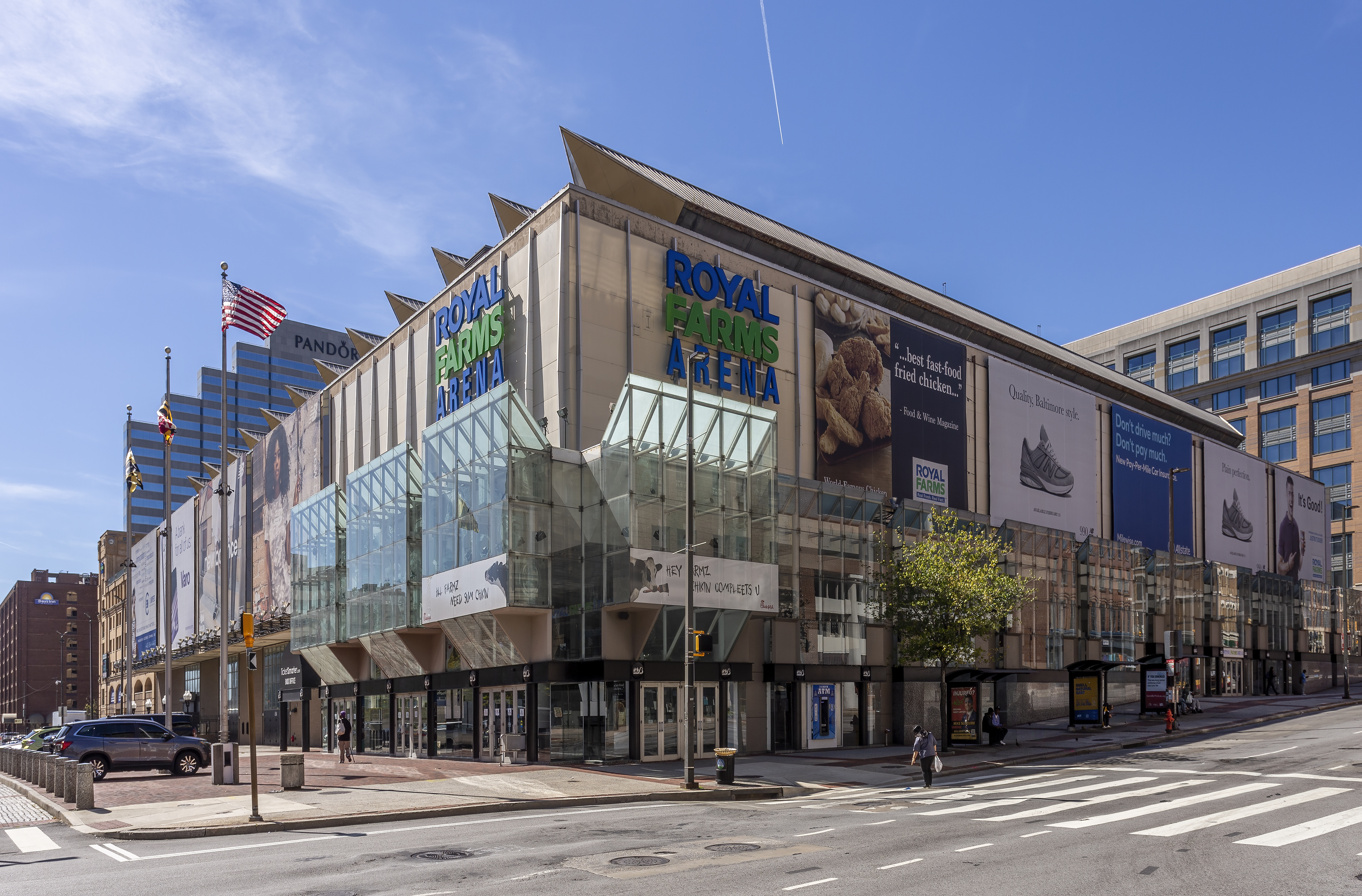
The 10th annual Backlash was held at the 1st Mariner Arena in Baltimore, Maryland.

Backlash is a professional wrestling pay-per-view (PPV) event that was established by World Wrestling Entertainment (WWE) in 1999. The concept is based around the backlash from WWE's flagship event, WrestleMania. The 10th event featured the backlash from WrestleMania XXIV and was scheduled to take place on April 27, 2008, at the 1st Mariner Arena in Baltimore, Maryland. It featured wrestlers from the Raw, SmackDown, and ECW brands.

=== Storylines ===
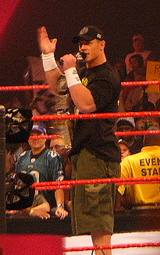
John Cena competed in Raw's WWE Championship match.

The card included matches that resulted from scripted storylines. Results were predetermined by WWE's writers on the Raw, SmackDown, and ECW brands, while storylines were produced on WWE's weekly television shows, Raw, SmackDown, and ECW.

Wrestlers from Raw were featured in the main event at Backlash: a fatal four-way elimination match for the WWE Championship, featuring the champion, Randy Orton, defending against Triple H, John Cena, and John "Bradshaw" Layfield (JBL). The buildup to the match began at WrestleMania XXIV, where Orton defended his title against Triple H and Cena in a triple threat match. Orton won the match, retaining the title after pinning Cena. On the following night's episode of Raw, with the WWE Championship shining on his shoulder, Orton crowed about defeating both Triple H and Cena at WrestleMania, declaring his reign as champion the "Age of Orton". But JBL had other ideas, telling Orton that he deserved a title match as a reward for proving that he was the toughest Superstar on Raw in his Belfast Brawl victory over Finlay also at WrestleMania. On the following week's episode of Raw, Orton began the night believing he would go one-on-one with JBL at Backlash, but the tide quickly turned on him. Due to Triple H's complaint about himself being kicked in the head by Orton when he was about to pin Cena to win the WWE title at WrestleMania, Raw General Manager William Regal placed Triple H into a Handicap match against Orton and JBL, and when Triple H won, Regal made the triple threat match for the title. Not to be outdone, Cena also pleaded his case to Regal, who gave him the same Handicap Match ultimatum. After Orton's intended interference failed, Cena pulled out the win, thus, the championship match at Backlash became a Fatal Four Way starring three former WWE Champions challenging Orton. On the following week's episode of Raw, after his victory over Regal, Orton felt compelled to meddle in the bout between Triple H and JBL. In an attempt at eliminating Triple H from Backlash, Orton ran in and nearly took off Triple H's head. He administered an RKO before then teaming with JBL against him. As Orton was set to punt Triple H again, however, JBL turned on him and laid him out with a vicious Clothesline From Hell.

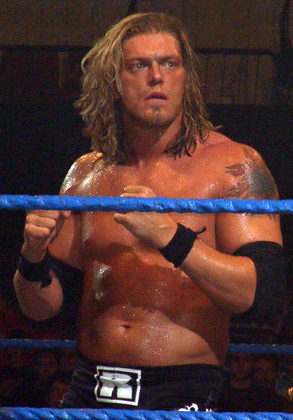
Edge, who faced The Undertaker for SmackDown's World Heavyweight Championship.

The main feud heading into Backlash on the SmackDown brand was between The Undertaker and Edge, over the World Heavyweight Championship. In February, at No Way Out, The Undertaker won an Elimination Chamber match to become the number one contender to the World Heavyweight Championship at WrestleMania XXIV. At WrestleMania, The Undertaker defeated Edge to win the World Heavyweight Championship and extend his WrestleMania undefeated streak to 16–0. On the April 4 episode of SmackDown, SmackDown General Manager Vickie Guerrero booked a WrestleMania rematch between The Undertaker and Edge for the World Heavyweight Championship at Backlash.

The secondary feud for SmackDown heading into Backlash was between Matt Hardy and Montel Vontavious Porter (MVP). On the November 16, 2007, episode of SmackDown! after failing to regain the WWE Tag Team Championship from John Morrison and The Miz, MVP attacked Hardy targeting and injuring his knee. The feud would start again at WrestleMania XXIV where Hardy cost MVP the Money in the Bank Ladder Match by performing a Twist of Fate at the top of the ladder. Hardy would then face MVP on the April 4, 2008, episode of SmackDown in a non-title match, which he won. It was confirmed on the next SmackDown that Hardy would face MVP for the United States Championship at Backlash.

The primary feud on the ECW brand was between Kane and Chavo Guerrero, with the two battling over the ECW Championship. Before WrestleMania XXIV aired live on pay-per-view, Kane won a 24-Man Battle Royal to earn an ECW Championship match against Guerrero later that night. Kane would go on to defeat Guerrero and become the new ECW Champion. On the April 4 episode of SmackDown, SmackDown! General Manager Vickie Guerrero booked Kane to defend the ECW Championship against Chavo at Backlash. The feud intensified on the April 8 episode of ECW, where during a contract signing for Backlash, Guerrero, with assistance from Bam Neely, Curt Hawkins and Zack Ryder, delivered a Frog splash on Kane through a table. Two weeks later on April 22, 2008, the feud again intensified during an episode of the Cutting Edge, in which Edge, Hawkins, Ryder, and Neely ganged up against Kane. The gang-up allowed Guerrero to attack Kane with a steel chair.

Another feud leading up to Backlash was between Shawn Michaels and Batista. Upset over the retirement of Ric Flair at the hands of Michaels at WrestleMania XXIV, Batista interrupted Michaels' address on the April 4 episode of SmackDown and called him a "selfish" person for what he did at WrestleMania. Batista blamed Michaels for not lying down for Flair and thus protecting his career instead of retiring him. Michaels defended his actions by saying Flair had called upon him to bring his best to WrestleMania, which he did. The conflict continued on an episode of Chris Jericho's "Highlight Reel" interview segment that featured both men on the April 7 episode of Raw. Following another tense verbal standoff, Batista left the ring saying he had something in store for Michaels. Moments later, Raw General Manager William Regal said he had confirmed a match with SmackDown General Manager Vickie Guerrero between Michaels and Batista at Backlash. In addition, the following week Jericho had a confrontation with Shawn Michaels who ended up kicking Jericho in the face. Frustrated, Jericho went to Regal in an effort to possibly add himself to the match. Regal did indeed add Jericho to the match, but not as a competitor. Instead he announced Jericho as a special guest referee for the match.

== Event ==
Other on-screen personnel
Role:	Name:
English commentators	Jim Ross (Raw)
English commentators	Jerry Lawler (Raw)
English commentators	Michael Cole (SmackDown)
English commentators	Mick Foley (SmackDown)
English commentators	Mike Adamle (ECW)
English commentators	Tazz (ECW)
Spanish commentators	Carlos Cabrera
Spanish commentators	Hugo Savinovich
Interviewers	Eve Torres
Interviewers	Todd Grisham
Ring announcers	Lilian Garcia (Raw)
Ring announcers	Justin Roberts (SmackDown)
Ring announcers	Tony Chimel (ECW)
Referees	Mickie Henson (SmackDown)
Referees	Chris Jericho (Batista vs Michaels)
Referees	Mike Posey (ECW)
Referees	Mike Chioda (Raw)
Referees	Jack Doan (Raw)
Referees	Jim Korderas (SmackDown)
Referees	Charles Robinson (SmackDown)

Before the event began and aired live on pay-per-view, a dark match was featured in which WWE Tag Team Champions John Morrison and The Miz defeated Jimmy Wang Yang and Shannon Moore.

=== Preliminary matches ===
The actual pay-per-view began with Montel Vontavious Porter (MVP) defending the United States Championship against Matt Hardy. Throughout the match, both Hardy and MVP performed a number of offensive maneuvers on each other, but Hardy eventually gained the advantage when MVP charged Hardy and Hardy dodged him, followed by Hardy performing a Twist of Fate, on MVP. He followed this with a cover for a successful pinfall, giving Hardy the victory and the championship.

The second bout was a standard match for the ECW Championship, in which the champion, Kane, defended his title against Chavo Guerrero, who was accompanied by Bam Neely. Guerrero spent much of the match attacking Kane's leg, and toward the end of the match he performed a frog splash, on Kane. Before he could cover Kane for a pinfall, however, Kane chokeslamed him. Kane then covered Guerrero for a pinfall, thus retaining his championship.

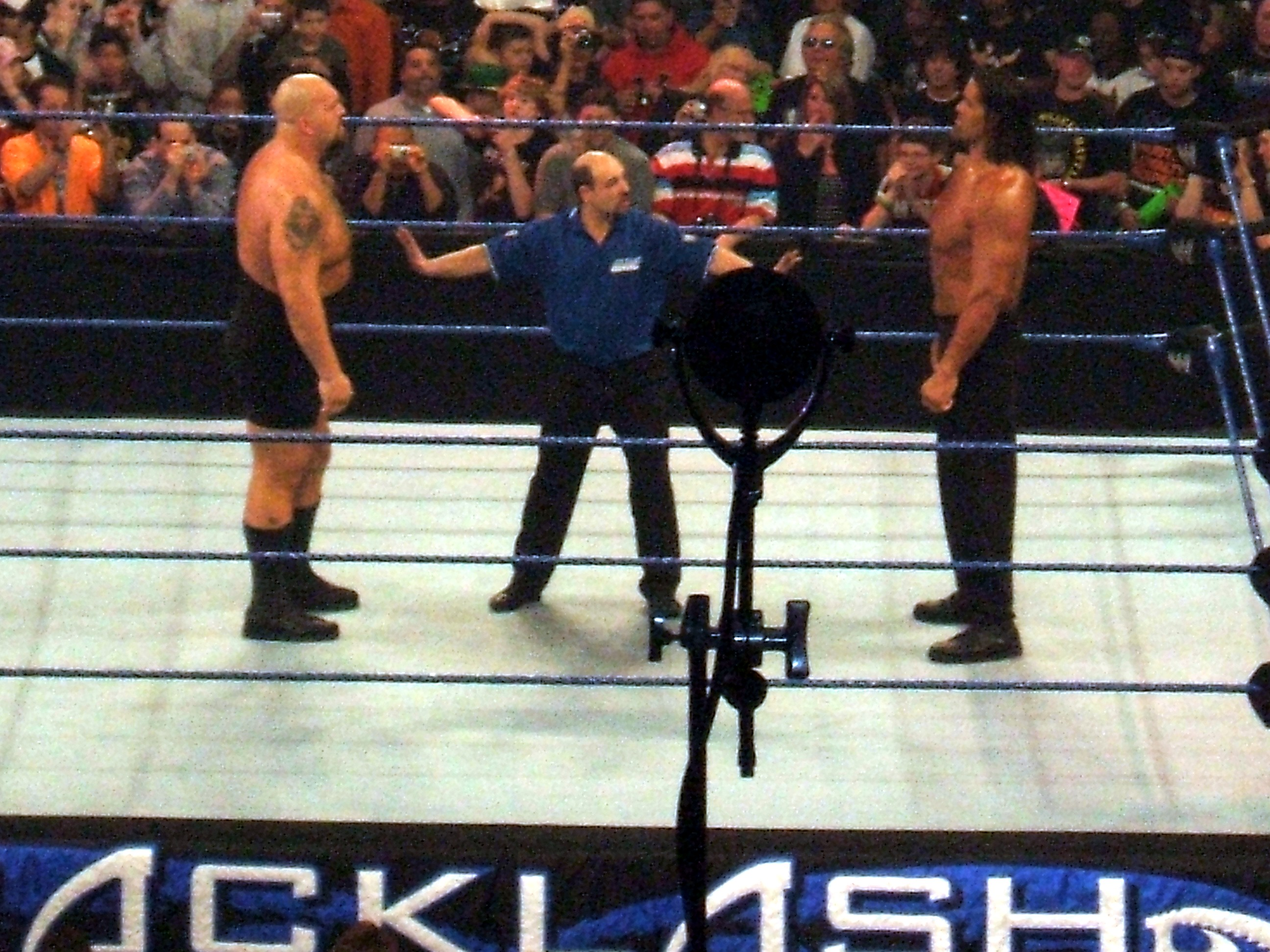
Big Show and The Great Khali staring at each other before their match.

The following contest featured Big Show against The Great Khali in a standard match. Both men wrestled inconclusively until Big Show performed a body slam onto Khali, after which Khali attempted to perform a two handed chokeslam on Big Show. Big Show countered, however, and delivered a chokeslam to Khali. He then covered him for a successful pinfall, winning the match.

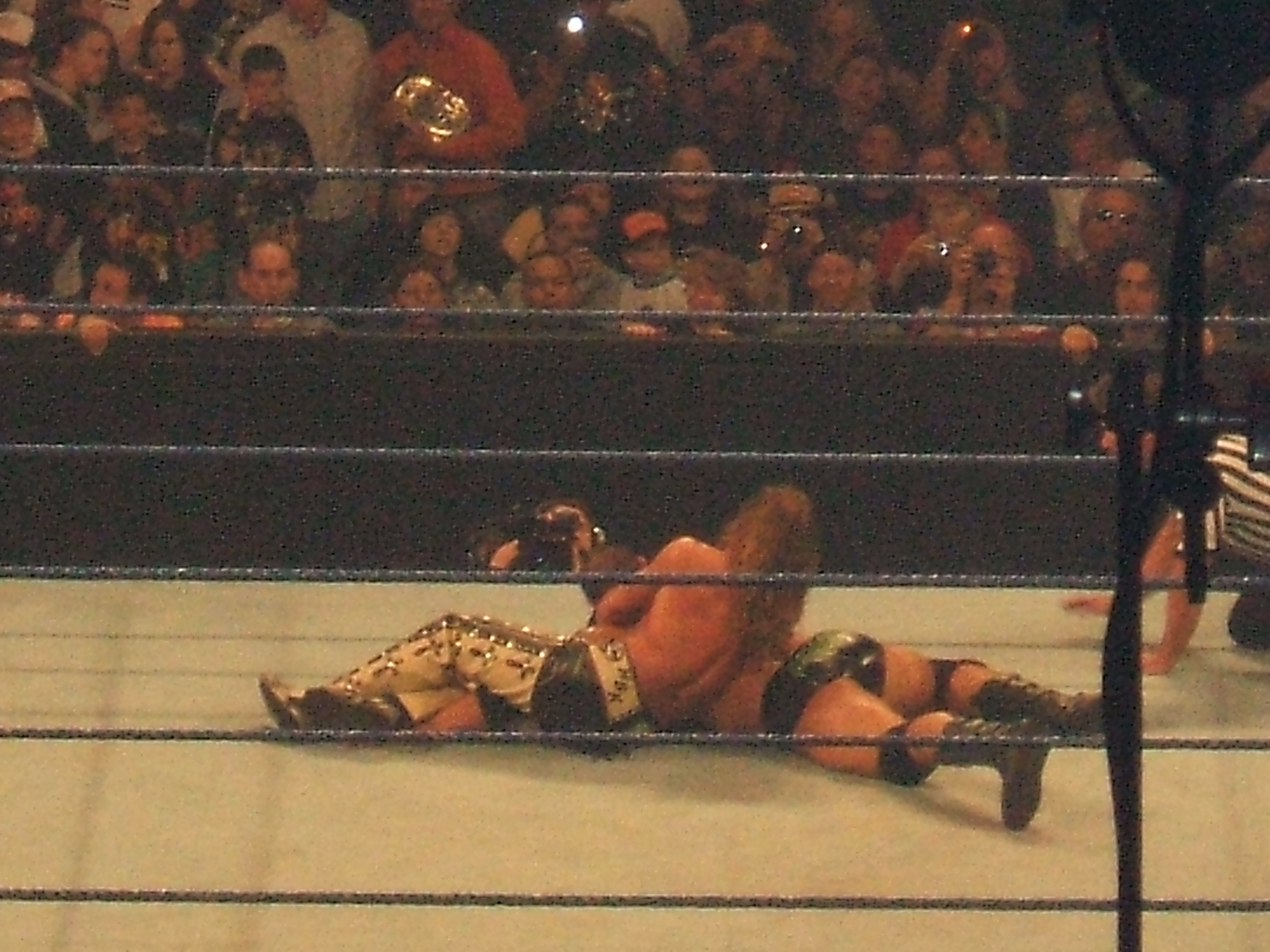
Shawn Michaels with a Crossface applied to Batista.

The fourth match was a standard match between Batista and Shawn Michaels, with Chris Jericho as a special guest referee. The men performed a number of offensive moves on one another throughout the match, including Shawn Michaels performing a crossface on Batista. The match also briefly went to the ringside area, where the ringpost was used as a weapon by Michaels. The end of the match came when Batista lifted Michaels for a powerbomb, the Batista Bomb. Michaels, however, escaped from the hold in the air, and when he fell, suffered a storyline knee injury, which caused Jericho to check on Michaels and stop Batista from acting. Michaels eventually got to his feet, and used Sweet Chin Music on Batista. Michaels then covered Batista for a successful pinfall, winning the match. Afterward, Michaels returned to the backstage area while limping heavily.

The next contest was a twelve-Diva tag team match featuring the team of Beth Phoenix, Melina, Natayla, Victoria, Layla, and Jillian Hall against the team of Mickie James, Ashley, Maria, Michelle McCool, Kelly Kelly, and Cherry. The match began with Michelle McCool against Beth Phoenix, and over the course of the match, all of the women participated in the contest. The end of the match came when Beth Phoenix performed a fisherman suplex on Ashley, and then covered her for a successful pin, giving her team the victory.

=== Main event matches ===
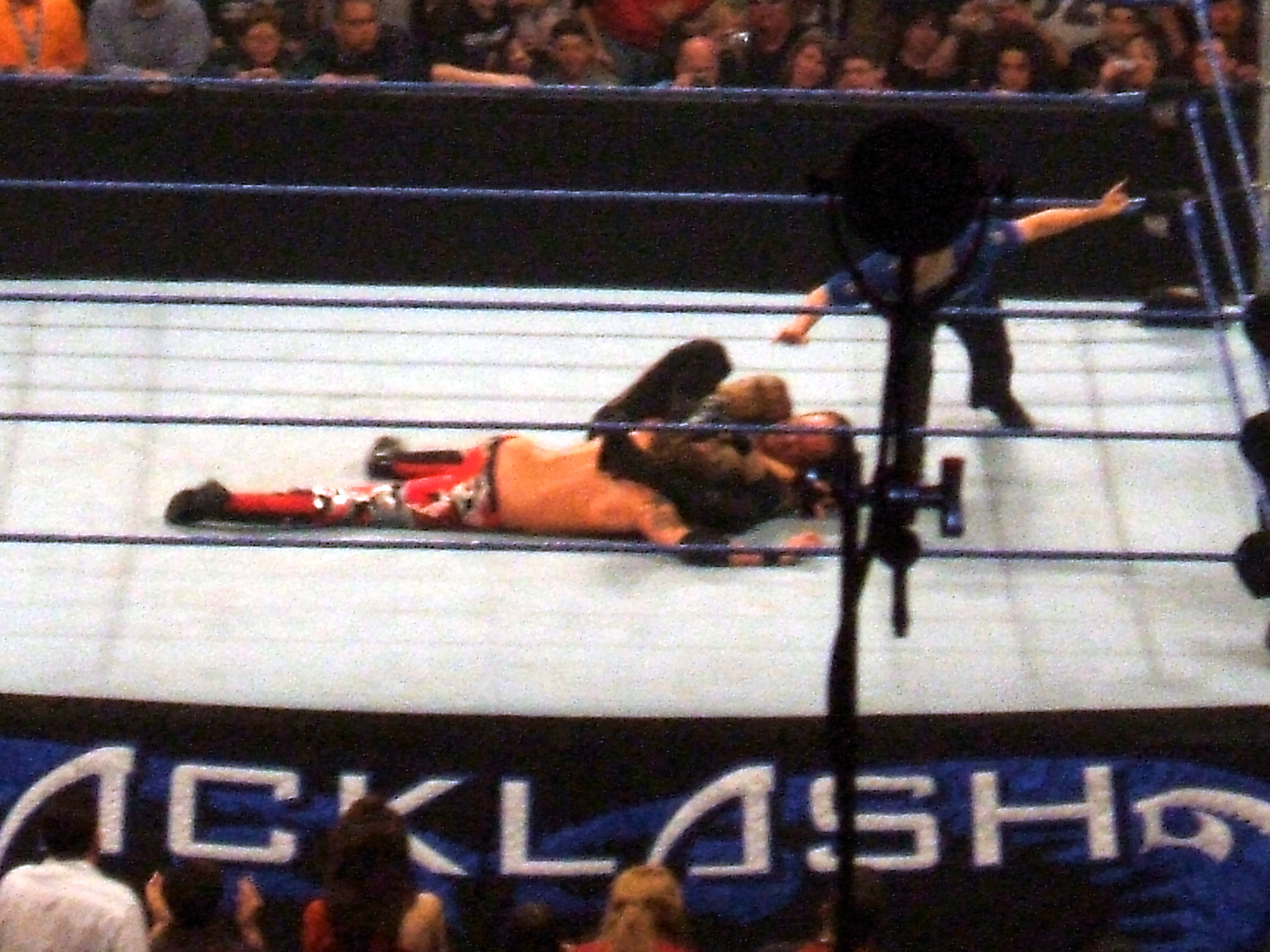
The Undertaker applying "Hell's Gate" on Edge, which ended the match.

The sixth match of the event was a standard match for the World Heavyweight Championship, in which the champion, The Undertaker, defended his title against Edge. The match was contested back and forth between the two men, with the early portions of the match featuring The Undertaker controlling much of the action. Edge eventually took an advantage when he exposed the turnbuckle in the corner, and The Undertaker ran head first into it. Curt Hawkins then struck The Undertaker with the World Heavyweight Championship belt, which was followed by an unsuccessful cover by Edge. Edge then attempted to hit The Undertaker with a spear, but The Undertaker countered the maneuver hitting Edge with a DDT. Zack Ryder then attempted to interfere on behalf of Edge, but The Undertaker threw Edge into Ryder and then caught Edge in an attempted Tombstone Piledriver, in which The Undertaker would have held Edge upside down and knelt, driving Edge's head into the mat. Edge countered the move, however, into a sunset flip. While Edge was pinning The Undertaker, however, The Undertaker performed a gogoplata submission hold, which caused Edge to submit, giving The Undertaker the victory. The Undertaker continued to apply the hold after the match ended, injuring (in storyline) Edge. Edge was removed from the ring on a stretcher by medics, making his injury appear realistic.

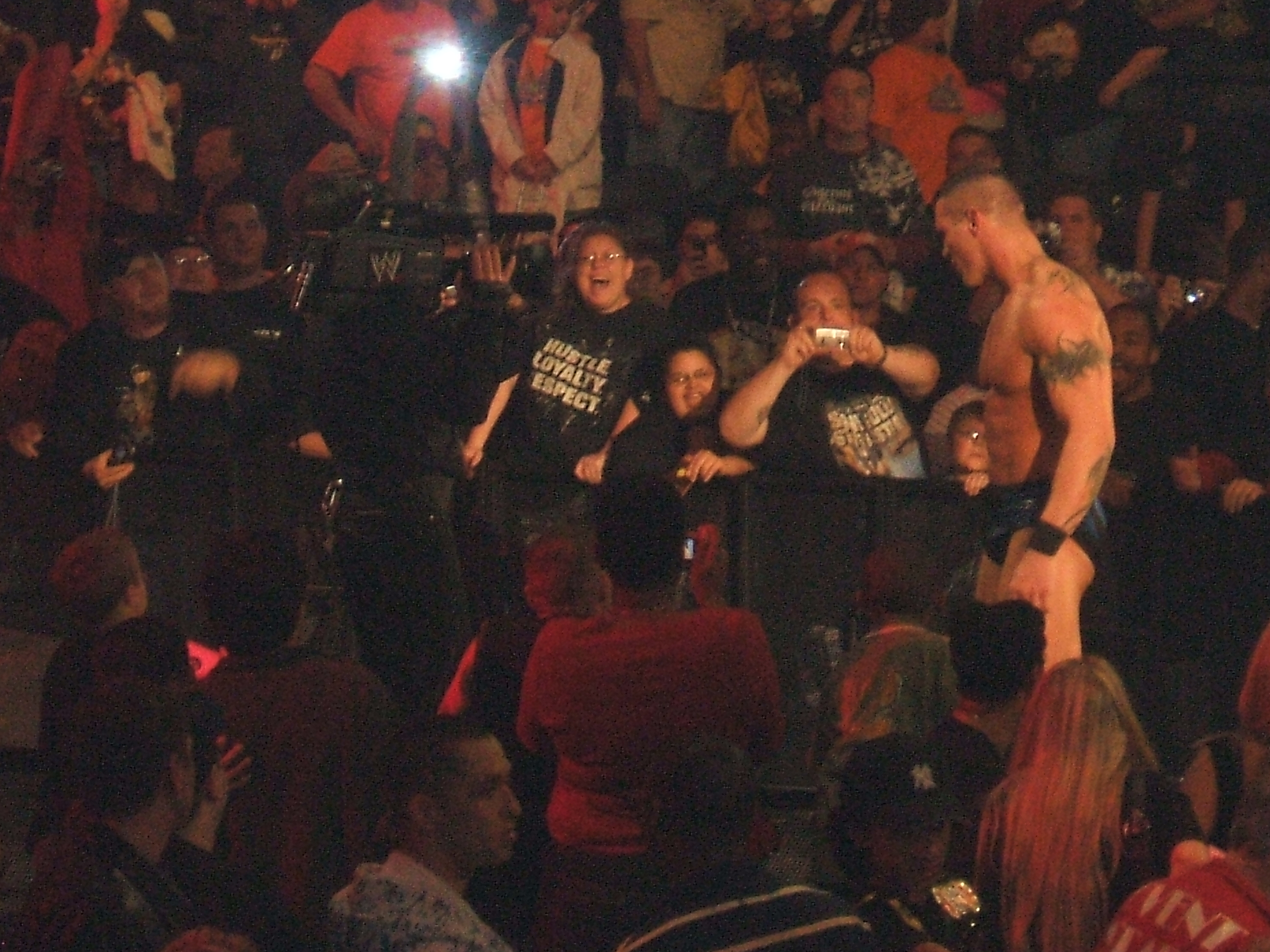
Randy Orton, who lost Raw's WWE Championship to Triple H.

In the main event, Randy Orton defended the WWE Championship against John Cena, John "Bradshaw" Layfield (JBL), and Triple H. The match began with Orton attempting to attack JBL, but JBL countered and threw Orton out of the ring. JBL then attacked Cena, before being attacked by Triple H. Cena then attempted to swing Triple H by the arm into the corner, but Triple H reversed the move and sent Cena outside of the ring. Triple H and JBL then fought in the ring, while Cena and Orton fought outside. Cena was later sent off the ring apron into the Raw announcer's table, and Orton and JBL teamed up to attack Triple H in the ring. Triple H eventually hit both of them with a clothesline, and JBL went to the outside of the ring while Triple H and Orton fought inside. Triple H later went outside of the ring and fought with JBL, while Cena returned to the ring and fought with Orton. After the men fought each other for several minutes, Cena put JBL in the STFU. This caused JBL to submit, eliminating him from the match. Immediately following JBL's submission, Orton kicked Cena in the head, which he followed with a cover for a pinfall, eliminating Cena from the match. Triple H and Orton then began to fight on the outside of the ring, with Orton taking control and sending Triple H back into the ring, where he dominated Triple H with a series of maneuvers for several minutes before Triple H struck Orton with his knee. The men fought outside the ring again, and when they returned, they fought for several more minutes until Orton performed a jumping cutter, or RKO, on Triple H. Orton would then try to pin Triple H, only to get a two count. Orton then attempted to kick Triple H in the head, but Triple H dodged the maneuver and both men would counter their finishers until Triple H performed a Pedigree on Orton followed by a successful pin-fall, thus earning him his twelfth world championship.

== Reception ==
The event had a final attendance of 11,277. Canadian Online Explorer's professional wrestling section rated the entire event a 6 out of 10 stars. The Fatal Four-Way main event match from the Raw brand was rated a 6 out of 10 stars, while the SmackDown brand's main event, a standard match for the World Heavyweight Championship, was rated an 8 out of 10 stars, and The Shawn Michaels/Batista match was rated the highest with having an 8.5 out of 10. The event was released on DVD on May 27, 2008 by Genius Products. The DVD reached second on Billboard's DVD Sales Chart for recreational sports during the week of June 21, 2008, and remained on the chart until the week of July 26, 2008, when it ranked 13.

== Aftermath ==
The feud between Triple H and Randy Orton continued. On the April 28 episode of Raw, Orton challenged Triple H for the WWE Championship later on in the night. William Regal stopped the match midway through, however, and later booked the two in a Steel Cage match for the title at Judgment Day.

On the May 2 episode of SmackDown, Vickie Guerrero cancelled a scheduled World Title match between Undertaker and The Great Khali and stripped The Undertaker of the World Heavyweight Championship, and Curt Hawkins and Zack Ryder stole the physical belt and handed it to Guerrero. The next week on SmackDown, Guerrero booked a "Championship Chase" where the winner would face the Undertaker for the vacant World Championship at Judgment Day. Batista originally won, but his victory was cut short after Guerrero came out and announced that Edge had been medically cleared and would be able to compete. Thus, the match continued, and Edge defeated Batista, gaining the championship match at Judgment Day.

The following night on Raw, Mickie James' team defeated Beth Phoenix's team in a 12-Diva rematch from Backlash. The following week, James retained the Women's Championship against Phoenix in a lumberjill match, with the win coming after the evil Melina attempted to strike James with her boot, but accidentally struck Phoenix. The alliance between Phoenix and Melina ended a week later, and the two Divas would face James at Judgment Day for the title.

== Results ==
No.	Results	Stipulations	Times
1^{D}	John Morrison and The Miz defeated Jimmy Wang Yang and Shannon Moore by pinfall	Tag team match	—
2	Matt Hardy defeated Montel Vontavious Porter (c) by pinfall	Singles match for the WWE United States Championship	11:24
3	Kane (c) defeated Chavo Guerrero (with Bam Neely) by pinfall	Singles match for the ECW Championship	8:49
4	Big Show defeated The Great Khali by pinfall	Singles match	8:05
5	Shawn Michaels defeated Batista by pinfall	Singles match with Chris Jericho as the special guest referee	14:59
6	Beth Phoenix, Jillian Hall, Layla, Melina, Natalya and Victoria defeated Ashley Massaro, Cherry, Kelly Kelly, Maria, Michelle McCool and Mickie James by pinfall	12-Diva tag team match	6:31
7	The Undertaker (c) defeated Edge by submission	Singles match for the World Heavyweight Championship	18:26
8	Triple H defeated John "Bradshaw" Layfield, John Cena and Randy Orton (c)	Fatal four-way elimination match for the WWE Championship	29:22
(c) / – the champion(s) heading into the match; D / – this was a dark match

Fatal-four-way match eliminations
Elimination no.	Wrestler	Eliminated by	Elimination move	Time
1	JBL	John Cena	Submitted to the STFU	10:29
2	John Cena	Randy Orton	Pinned after a punt to the head	10:41
3	Randy Orton	Triple H	Pinned after a Pedigree	29:22
Winner	Triple H			
