= Armageddon (2008) =

World Wrestling Entertainment pay-per-view event

- Promotional poster featuring Chris Jericho
- Promotion: World Wrestling Entertainment
- Brand(s): Raw; SmackDown; ECW
- Date: December 14, 2008
- City: Buffalo, New York
- Venue: HSBC Arena
- Attendance: 12,500
- Buy rate: 193,000

Pay-per-view chronology
← Previous; Survivor Series	Next → Royal Rumble

Armageddon chronology
← Previous; 2007	Next → Final

The 2008 Armageddon was a professional wrestling pay-per-view (PPV) event produced by World Wrestling Entertainment (WWE). It was the ninth and final Armageddon and took place on December 14, 2008, at the HSBC Arena in Buffalo, New York, held for wrestlers from the promotion's Raw, SmackDown, and ECW brand divisions. This was the first and only Armageddon PPV broadcast in high definition. In 2009, the event was replaced by TLC: Tables, Ladders & Chairs.

Seven professional wrestling matches were held on the event's card. During the SmackDown main event, Jeff Hardy defeated Triple H and WWE Champion Edge in a triple threat match to win the championship. The Raw main event featured the World Heavyweight Championship contested in a standard wrestling match, in which John Cena defeated Chris Jericho to retain the title. The undercard featured several matches, including CM Punk against Rey Mysterio in the finals of a tournament to determine the number one contender to the WWE Intercontinental Championship, and Randy Orton versus Batista in a standard wrestling match.

Armageddon helped WWE earn US$15.9 million in revenue from pay-per-view events, thanks to an attendance of approximately 12,500 and 193,000 pay-per-view buys. When the 2008 event was released on DVD it reached a peak position of second on Billboard's DVD Sales Chart. The professional wrestling section of the Canadian Online Explorer website rated the entire event a perfect 10 out of 10.

== Production ==
=== Background ===
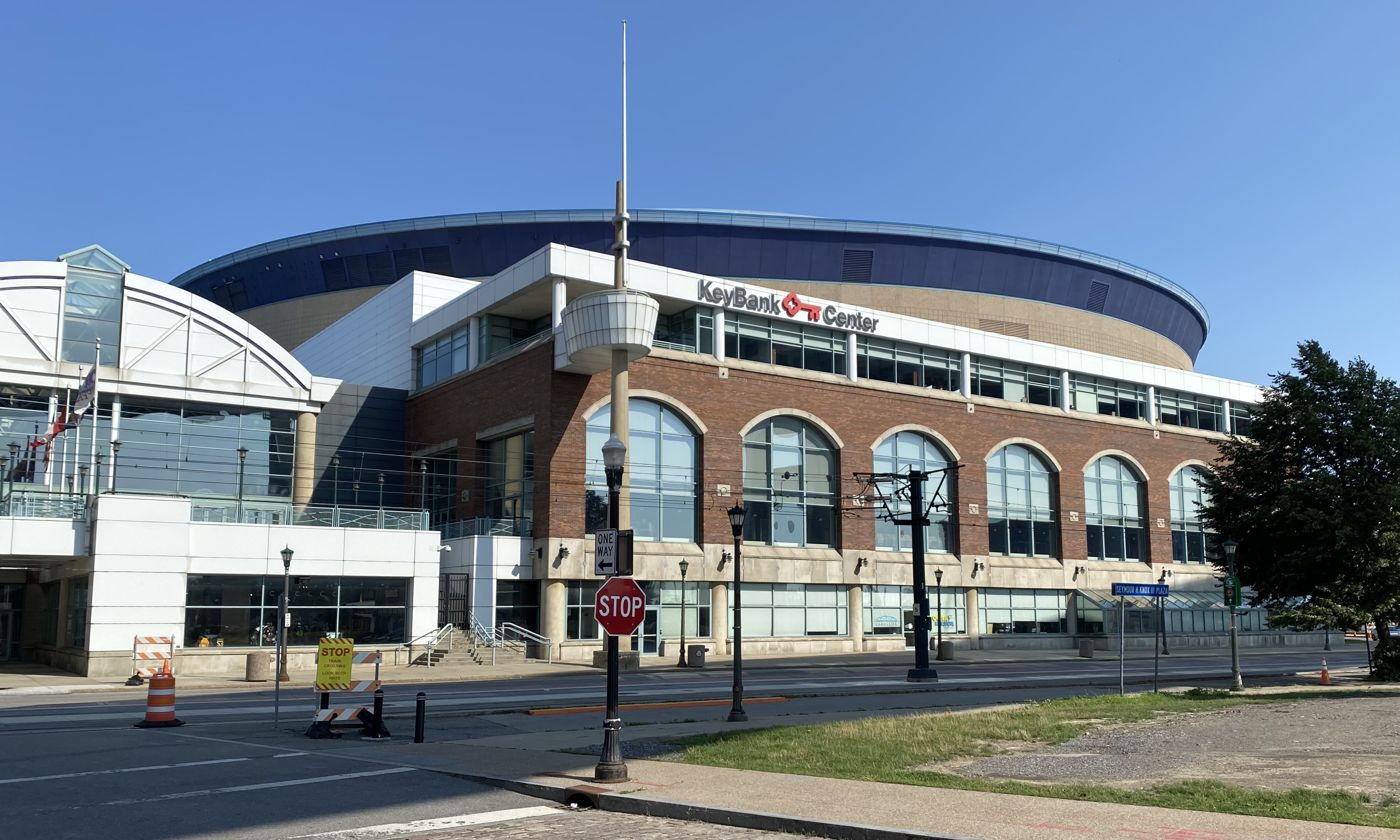
The ninth Armageddon was held at the HSBC Arena in Buffalo, New York.

Armageddon was a professional wrestling pay-per-view (PPV) event established by World Wrestling Entertainment (WWE) in 1999 and held every December except in 2001. The ninth event was held on December 14, 2008, at the HSBC Arena in Buffalo, New York, and featured wrestlers from the Raw, SmackDown, and ECW brand divisions. This was the first Armageddon PPV broadcast in high definition.

=== Storylines ===
Armageddon featured seven professional wrestling matches that involved different wrestlers from pre-existing scripted feuds and storylines that had played out on Raw, SmackDown, and ECW on Sci Fi—WWE's television programs. The event featured wrestlers from WWE's Raw, SmackDown, and ECW brands—a storyline division in which WWE employees are assigned to the television program of the same name.

The main rivalry heading into Armageddon on the SmackDown brand was a match involving three competitors, known as a triple threat match in WWE, for the WWE Championship between Edge, Triple H, and Jeff Hardy. At Survivor Series, Jeff Hardy was out of action after being found unconscious in the stairwell of his Boston hotel earlier in the morning. This resulted to Hardy being removed from the WWE title match, leaving Triple H and Vladimir Kozlov battling each other one-on-one. Just when it looked like Triple H had Kozlov beat after nailing him with a hard-hitting Pedigree, SmackDown's primary authority figure Vickie Guerrero interrupted the match to announce that it would indeed be a Triple Threat match– with Edge as the last minute third competitor. Edge made his way to the ring and nailed Triple H with a vicious Spear. Next, Hardy surprisingly ran into the ring and attacked Edge. Hardy then grabbed a steel chair, returned to the ring and knocked both Triple H and Kozlov with each chair shot to the head. As Hardy was about to nail Edge with the chair, Edge countered by spearing Hardy then capitalized, by covering Triple H for the win and won his sixth World Championship. SmackDown general manager, Vickie Guerrero announced on the November 28 episode of SmackDown that Triple H, Hardy, and Vladimir Kozlov would compete in a "Beat the Clock" challenge to gain the opportunity to face Edge at Armageddon for the title. In a Beat the Clock challenge, wrestlers compete in separate individual matches and whoever wins their match in the fastest time wins the competition. The first contest saw Hardy defeat The Brian Kendrick in 12:13. Kozlov fought in the second encounter against Matt Hardy, but failed to defeat him in under 12:13, thus being eliminated from the challenge. The last match-up pitted Triple H against Shelton Benjamin, which ended with Triple H gaining the fall at exactly 12:13. As a result of the tie, neither man was announced as the contender for the championship. One week later on the December 5, 2008 episode of SmackDown, it was announced that the WWE board of directors had decided Edge would have to defend the title against both Triple H and Hardy at Armageddon.

John Cena and Chris Jericho were involved in the main rivalry on the Raw brand over the World Heavyweight Championship. At WWE's November Survivor Series, Cena returned to WWE after a legitimate neck injury (that he sustained at SummerSlam) and defeated Jericho to win the championship. On the November 24 episode of Raw, Jericho defeated Randy Orton and Batista in a Triple Threat match to earn a title match against Cena at Armageddon.

On the November 24 episode of Raw, Raw's primary authority figure Stephanie McMahon announced an eight-man single-elimination tournament to determine the number-one contender to the WWE Intercontinental Championship, which William Regal held. The first round saw four standard matches, in which Kofi Kingston, CM Punk, John Morrison, and Rey Mysterio were the victors. In the second round, Punk defeated Morrison and Mysterio defeated Kingston, resulting in Mysterio and Punk both qualifying for the finals at Armageddon.

== Event ==
Other on-screen personnel
Role:	Name:
English Commentators	Michael Cole (Raw)
English Commentators	Jerry Lawler (Raw)
English Commentators	Jim Ross (SmackDown)
English Commentators	Tazz (SmackDown)
English Commentators	Todd Grisham (ECW)
English Commentators	Matt Striker (ECW)
Spanish Commentators	Carlos Cabrera
Spanish Commentators	Hugo Savinovich
Backstage interviewer	Eve Torres
Ring announcers	Lilian Garcia (Raw)
Ring announcers	Justin Roberts (SmackDown/ECW)
Referees	Mike Chioda
Referees	Marty Elias
Referees	Chad Patton
Referees	Mike Posey
Referees	Aaron Mahoney

=== Pre-show ===
Before Armageddon began, a non-televised match took place between the team of John Morrison and The Miz and the team of Jesse and Festus, which Morrison and The Miz won.

=== Preliminary matches ===
The first match of the event was between Matt Hardy and Vladimir Kozlov. Kozlov executed a chokeslam to gain the pinfall victory.

The second match was the finals of the Intercontinental Championship contender tournament between Rey Mysterio and CM Punk. In the end, Mysterio attempted the 619 but Punk countered the move into the Go To Sleep to win the tournament.

Finlay was pitted against Mark Henry, who was accompanied by Tony Atlas, in a match with no disqualifications billed as a Belfast Brawl. In the climax, Finlay retrieved the steel steps but Henry countered and retrieved them himself. Finlay retrieved a shillelagh and hit Henry with it to win the match.

Batista versus Randy Orton was next, with Orton being accompanied to the ring by Cody Rhodes and Manu. The end came when Batista executed the Batista Bomb to win the match.

The fifth match was an Eight Woman Santa's Little Helper Tag Team match where all eight competitors were dressed in Christmas outfits. It pitted two teams of four against each other: Michelle McCool, Maria, Kelly Kelly, and Mickie James versus Maryse, Jillian Hall, Victoria, and Natayla. The match ended quickly with McCool getting a pinfall victory over Hall after the Faithbreaker.

=== Main event matches ===
The sixth and penultimate match on the card saw John Cena defend the World Heavyweight Championship against Chris Jericho. Cena attempted an FU on Jericho but Jericho countered the move into a Codebreaker for a near-fall. Cena executed an FU on Jericho for a near-fall. Jericho applied the Walls of Jericho on Cena but Cena escaped the hold. Cena forced Jericho to submit to the STFU to retain the title.

The main event saw Edge defend the WWE Championship against both Triple H and Jeff Hardy in a triple threat match. Hardy performed a Swanton Bomb on Triple H but Edge pulled Hardy out of the ring, voiding the pinfall. Edge attempted a spear on Triple H, but Triple H avoided the move, and Edge executed a spear through a broadcast table on Hardy. Triple H executed a Pedigree on Edge, but Vladimir Kozlov interfered and pulled Triple H out of the ring, voiding the pinfall. Kozlov attacked Triple H, but Matt Hardy stopped Kozlov. In the end, Triple H performed a Pedigree on Edge, but Hardy executed a Swanton Bomb on Edge, causing Triple H to roll out of the ring, and pinned Edge to win the title.

== Reception ==
The HSBC Arena has a maximum capacity of 19,200, however Armageddon only had an attendance of 12,500. It received 193,000 buys, which was less than the 237,000 buys the previous year's event received. Armageddon helped World Wrestling Entertainment earn $15.9 million in revenue from pay-per-view events, but this was less than the $19.9 million earned the previous year; Linda McMahon, the CEO of WWE, confirmed this statement on February 24, 2009 in a quarterly financial report. Canadian Online Explorer's professional wrestling section rated the event a perfect ten out of ten. Wade Keller of Pro Wrestling Torch rated the main event match for the WWE Championship 4 and a quarter stars out of 5. He went on to state that the match was a "really satisfying main event and it's the finish WWE dared not do for a long time." He rated the match for the World Heavyweight Championship 3 and a quarter stars out of 5 and proclaimed he thought it was a "good match".

Sony Music Entertainment released the event on DVD on January 13, 2009, and it reached second place on Billboard's DVD Sales Chart for recreation.

== Aftermath ==
=== Raw ===
The rivalry between Batista and Orton continued until the December 15, episode of Raw, when Orton punted Batista in the head, giving him a storyline concussion, causing him to take time off indefinitely. WWE.com later reported that Batista elected to undergo surgery to repair a legitimate hamstring tear (that he suffered during his match with John Cena at SummerSlam).

CM Punk received his match for the WWE Intercontinental Championship on the January 5, 2009, episode of Raw against William Regal, but failed to win due to Regal getting himself disqualified. Two weeks later, Punk and Regal had another match this time under no disqualifications rules, which Punk won to claim the title.

=== SmackDown ===
After Armageddon on the January 2, 2009, episode of SmackDown, Vickie Guerrero announced that Jeff Hardy would defend the WWE Championship against Edge at WWE's Royal Rumble pay-per-view. At the Royal Rumble, Edge defeated Hardy to regain the WWE Championship with the unexpected help from Matt Hardy.

The rivalry between Michelle McCool and Maryse continued on the following edition of SmackDown when Maryse defeated Maria to earn another shot at Michelle's Divas Championship. On the December 26 edition of SmackDown, Maryse defeated Michelle to win her first Divas Championship in a match that Maria officiated. After the match ended, Michelle turned heel and attacked Maria; blaming her for the loss.

=== Future ===
The 2008 Armageddon was the final Armageddon PPV produced. In 2009, the event was discontinued and replaced by TLC: Tables, Ladders & Chairs.

== Results ==
No.	Results	Stipulations	Times
1^{D}	John Morrison and The Miz defeated Jesse and Festus by pinfall	Tag team match	—
2	Vladimir Kozlov defeated Matt Hardy by pinfall	Singles match	9:02
3	CM Punk defeated Rey Mysterio by pinfall	Singles match to determine the #1 contender to the WWE Intercontinental Championship	12:15
4	Finlay defeated Mark Henry (with Tony Atlas) by pinfall	Belfast Brawl	9:38
5	Batista defeated Randy Orton (with Cody Rhodes and Manu) by pinfall	Singles match	16:41
6	Kelly Kelly, Maria, Michelle McCool, and Mickie James defeated Jillian Hall, Maryse, Natalya, and Victoria	Eight-Diva Santa's Little Helper tag team match	5:32
7	John Cena (c) defeated Chris Jericho by submission	Singles match for the World Heavyweight Championship	12:43
8	Jeff Hardy defeated Edge (c) and Triple H by pinfall	Triple threat match for the WWE Championship	17:19
(c) / – the champion(s) heading into the match; D / – this was a dark match

=== Intercontinental Championship #1 Contender's Tournament ===
1st Round; Raw; November 24 – December 1, 2008
Kofi Kingston	Disqualification
Kane	2:39
Rey Mysterio	Pinfall
The Miz	3:35
John Morrison	Pinfall
Finlay	4:10
CM Punk	Pinfall
Snitsky	5:14

Semifinals; Raw: Slammy Awards; December 8, 2008
Kofi Kingston	3:12
Rey Mysterio	Pinfall
John Morrison	8:17
CM Punk	Pinfall

Finals; Armageddon; December 14, 2008
Rey Mysterio	12:15
CM Punk	Pinfall
