= Armageddon (2007) =

World Wrestling Entertainment pay-per-view event

- Promotional poster featuring Batista
- Promotion: World Wrestling Entertainment
- Brand(s): Raw; SmackDown! ECW
- Date: December 16, 2007
- City: Pittsburgh, Pennsylvania
- Venue: Mellon Arena
- Attendance: 12,500
- Buy rate: 237,000
- Tagline: The Most Devastating Wars Are Fought Over Championship Gold.

Pay-per-view chronology
← Previous; Survivor Series	Next → Royal Rumble

Armageddon chronology
← Previous; 2006	Next → 2008

The 2007 Armageddon was a professional wrestling pay-per-view (PPV) event produced by World Wrestling Entertainment (WWE). It was the eighth Armageddon and took place on December 16, 2007, at the Mellon Arena in Pittsburgh, Pennsylvania, held for wrestlers from the promotion's Raw, SmackDown!, and ECW brand divisions. This was the first Armageddon since 2002 to feature multiple brands after WWE discontinued brand-exclusive PPVs following WrestleMania 23 in April, also making it the first Armageddon to feature ECW, which was introduced as a third brand in May 2006.

Eight professional wrestling matches were scheduled for the event, which featured a supercard, a scheduling of more than one main bout. The first of these was a triple Threat match from the SmackDown! brand that featured Edge defeating World Heavyweight Champion Batista and The Undertaker to win the title. The second was a singles match from the Raw brand, in which Chris Jericho defeated WWE Champion Randy Orton by disqualification, although Orton retained the championship. The other was a tag team match from the ECW brand, in which the team of Big Daddy V and Mark Henry defeated the team of CM Punk and Kane.

This was the last WWE PPV broadcast in 4:3 (480p standard definition) format, as in January 2008, all WWE shows began broadcasting in 720p high definition. The event was attended by 12,500 people and received 237,000 pay-per-view buys. Critical reception to the event was mainly positive.

== Production ==
=== Background ===
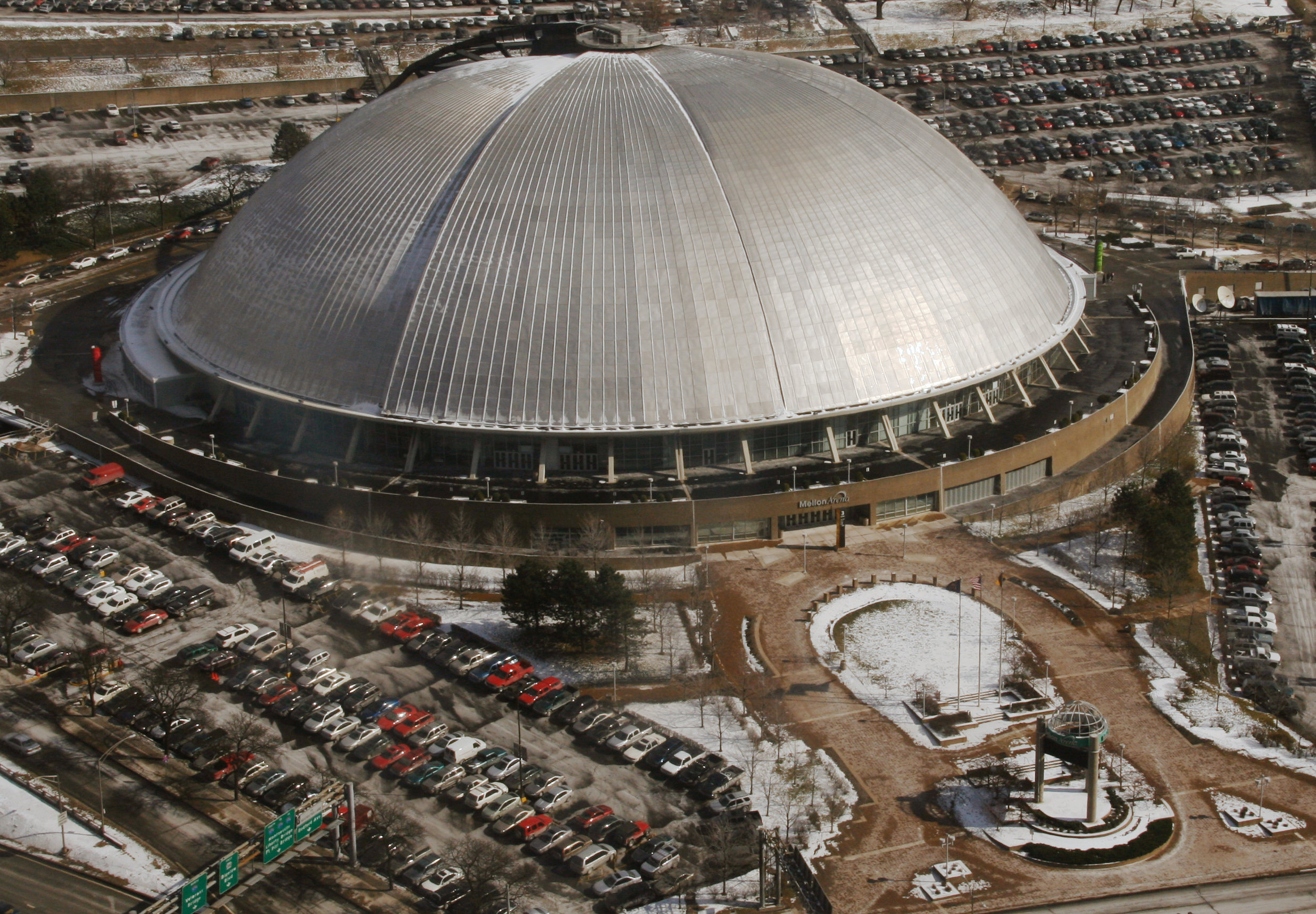
The eighth Armageddon was held at the Mellon Arena in Pittsburgh, Pennsylvania.

Armageddon was a professional wrestling pay-per-view (PPV) event established by World Wrestling Entertainment (WWE) in 1999 and held every December except in 2001. The eighth event was held on December 16, 2007, at the Mellon Arena in Pittsburgh, Pennsylvania. While the previous three years's events were held exclusively for the SmackDown! brand, the 2007 event featured wrestlers from the Raw, SmackDown!, and ECW brands, as following WrestleMania 23 earlier in April, brand-exclusive PPVs were discontinued. This made it the first Armageddon since 2002 to feature multiple brands as well as the first to feature ECW, which was introduced as a third brand in May 2006. The event was sponsored by Activision's Call of Duty 4: Modern Warfare.

=== Storylines ===
The event featured eight professional wrestling matches that resulted from scripted storylines. Results were predetermined by WWE's writers on the Raw, SmackDown!, and ECW brands, while storylines were produced on WWE's weekly television shows, Monday Night Raw, SmackDown!, and ECW.

The predominant rivalry scripted into Armageddon on the SmackDown! brand was between Batista, Edge, and The Undertaker, over the World Heavyweight Championship. At Survivor Series, Batista and The Undertaker fought in a Hell in a Cell match for the World Heavyweight Championship. Edge (who was disguised as a cameraman at ringside) interfered and cost Undertaker the match. He was then given a title shot for the World Heavyweight Championship on the November 30, 2007 episode of SmackDown! by SmackDown! general manager Vickie Guerrero, who was his storyline love interest. That same night, Batista defended the World Heavyweight Championship against Edge and looked set to retain his title once again, but The Undertaker interfered and chokeslammed Batista, but Edge ran out of the ring to escape similar treatment. Theodore Long returned as assistant general manager and booked Batista to defend the World Heavyweight Championship against Edge and The Undertaker in a triple threat match at Armageddon.

The main feud on the Raw brand was between Randy Orton and the recently returned Chris Jericho, with the two battling over the WWE Championship. Jericho returned to WWE on the November 19 episode of Raw, interrupting Orton during Orton's orchestrated "passing of the torch" ceremony. Jericho revealed his intentions to reclaim the WWE Championship in order to "save" WWE from Orton. He then laid a challenge to Orton with the WWE Championship on the line, which Orton did not accept. A week later, Jericho cost him a match against Ric Flair to further convince him to accept the challenge. After Raw went off the air, Orton accepted the challenge.

The main feud on the ECW brand was between CM Punk and Kane against Big Daddy V and Mark Henry. The rivalry started on December 4 episode of ECW, Punk was forced to choose either Big Daddy V or Henry to face in the main event; Punk chose Henry. Punk got a disqualification victory when Big Daddy V interfered. The two tried to double-team Punk until Kane made the save and attacked both Big Daddy V and Henry. This made the Armageddon match of Kane and CM Punk against Big Daddy V and Mark Henry. On the December 11 edition of ECW, Punk and Kane picked up a victory against Deuce 'n Domino.

== Event ==
Other on-screen personnel
Role:	Name:
English commentators	Jim Ross (Raw)
English commentators	Jerry Lawler (Raw)
English commentators	Michael Cole (SmackDown!)
English commentators	John "Bradshaw" Layfield (SmackDown!)
English commentators	Joey Styles (ECW)
English commentators	Tazz (ECW) / Main Event
Spanish commentators	Carlos Cabrera
Spanish commentators	Hugo Savinovich
Interviewers	Todd Grisham
Interviewers	Anastasia Rose
Ring announcers	Lilian Garcia (Raw)
Ring announcers	Justin Roberts (SmackDown!)
Ring announcers	Tony Chimel (ECW)
Referees	Charles Robinson
Referees	Mike Chioda
Referees	Jimmy Korderas
Referees	Mickie Henson
Referees	Scott Armstrong
Referees	Marty Elias
Referees	Chad Patton

Before the event went live on pay-per-view, Jesse and Festus defeated WWE Tag Team Champions John Morrison and The Miz in a dark match.

=== Preliminary matches ===
The opening match was between Rey Mysterio and Montel Vontavious Porter (MVP) for MVP's WWE United States Championship. Mysterio used his quickness and aerial techniques to be on the top. Mysterio wrestled a good match by sending MVP who crashed on the arena floor and then he executed a hurricanrana on MVP. Mysterio got into the ring to break the referee's 10 count and MVP also got up at the 8 count, but he simply walked out instead of coming back into the ring after he climbed on the ring apron. MVP was counted out and thus he retained the title because a title does not change hands by countout. After the match, Mysterio threw MVP back into the ring and executed the 619 on MVP.

The second match was a tag team match in which CM Punk teamed up with Kane against Big Daddy V and Mark Henry. Big Daddy V and Henry dominated the match by destroying Punk and Kane. The two managed to control in the middle of the match when Punk was able to bring Big Daddy V to one knee but Big Daddy V overpowered Punk by executing a body avalanche and a Samoan drop on Punk to get the victory.

The third match was between Shawn Michaels and Mr. Kennedy. Michaels reeled Kennedy in the beginning of the match. A stomp by Michaels injured Kennedy's left hand. Michaels went on to execute a diving elbow drop on Kennedy and then he also attempted a Sweet Chin Music but Kennedy countered it into a roll-up. Michaels kicked out but Kennedy continued to punch Michaels with his injured left hand, further injuring Kennedy. Michaels executed a Sweet Chin Music for the victory.

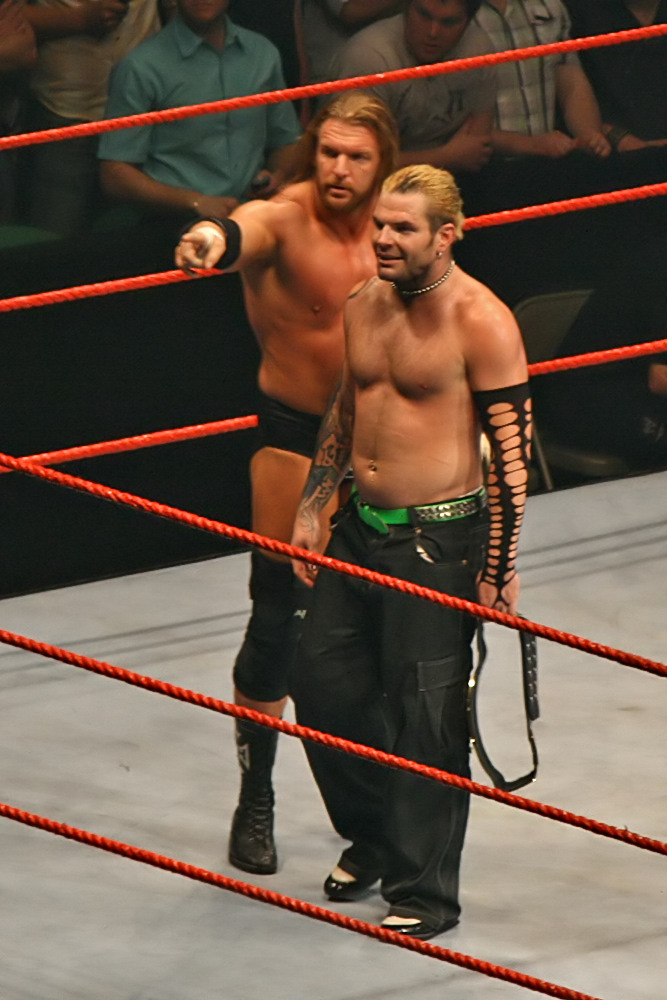
Triple H (left) and Jeff Hardy (right) had a respectful feud before Armageddon.

The fourth match was a number one contender's match between Jeff Hardy and Triple H. The pre-match stipulations were that the winner would get a WWE Championship match at the 2008 Royal Rumble. Before the match started, Hardy and Triple H shook hands. During the match, Hardy seemed dazed after he suffered a series of clotheslines and shoulder blocks. Triple H tried to execute a Pedigree but Hardy countered it into a jackknife pin which won Hardy the match. As Hardy celebrated Triple H was smiling at the fact that he was pinned so easily, Triple H then celebrated with Hardy.

The fifth match was between Finlay and The Great Khali. The referee's back was turned and he was distracted by Finlay until Hornswoggle took advantage and hit a shillelagh in the groin of Khali. Finlay hit a shillelagh in the head of Khali followed by a successful pinfall victory for Finlay.

=== Main event matches ===
The sixth match of the night and Raw's main event was Randy Orton defending the WWE Championship against Chris Jericho. Jericho controlled the match by beating Orton and performing many moves. Jericho would then knock Orton to the outside with a clothesline, which made Orton lay in front of SmackDown!'s announcer's table. Jericho would then launch into Orton, but Orton would move, which made Jericho run into John "Bradshaw" Layfield (JBL). Then Jericho and Orton would get back into the ring. Jericho would then apply the Walls of Jericho on Orton. He tried to reach the ropes, but Jericho pulled him back to the middle of the ring. JBL then interfered and kicked Jericho, which disqualified Orton. A title cannot change hands by disqualification, therefore Orton retained the WWE Championship. After the match, Orton delivered an RKO to Jericho.

The seventh match was a divas match between Beth Phoenix and Mickie James for the WWE Women's Championship. During the match, Phoenix overpowered Mickie but Mickie bounced back with several near-falls. The match came to an end when Phoenix executed a Fisherman suplex and then pinned Mickie to retain the WWE Women's Championship.

The main event was a triple threat match for the World Heavyweight Championship between defending champion Batista, Edge, and The Undertaker. Before the match, Edge told Vickie that her love gave him the strength of three men. Batista and The Undertaker fought each other to decide who would fight Edge first. Edge kept his distance outside the ring. In the ring, The Undertaker applied his triangle choke on Batista. Edge sounded the ring bell and everyone (even The Undertaker himself) thought that the match was over. Edge took the opportunity and speared both men but could not score a pinfall. Batista dominated the match in the end when he executed a spinebuster on The Undertaker and speared Edge outside the ring. The Undertaker chokeslammed Batista and sent an attacking Edge to the floor. Batista and The Undertaker were fighting inside the ring until the three "Edges" appeared on the outside floor. The Undertaker executed a Tombstone Piledriver on Batista, after which until the "real" Edge hit The Undertaker with a steel chair in his spine and his skull. Edge took advantage and quickly pinned Batista to win the World Heavyweight Championship.

== Reception ==
Armageddon received 237,000 pay-per-view buys, 2,000 less than the 2006 event. 12,500 people attended the show in the Mellon Arena, earning US$675,000.

The show received generally positive reviews. Writing for the Canadian Online Explorer's Slam! Sports section, Bob Kapur rated the event seven from a possible ten. His highest rated match of the night was Michaels vs. Kennedy, which he awarded eight out of ten, and praised the "[g]reat storytelling" throughout. The editor of the Pro Wrestling Torch, Wade Keller, also praised the Michaels/Kennedy match as "very good", but rated the match between Hardy and Triple H higher, lauding it as an "excellent match" that told a "great story". Reviewing the show for The Baltimore Sun, Kevin Eck complimented the psychology of both the Michaels-Kennedy and Hardy-Triple H matches. Overall, Eck stated show displayed booking that "was on the mark for the most part".

The worst matches of the night according to Kapur were the ECW tag team bout and the Khali-Finlay match, both of which he rated three of ten. Keller described the tag match as being as expected, noting the middle section "dragged", and called the Khali and Finlay match "lousy". He also criticised the show for finishing earlier than usual pay-per-views, and stated the World Heavyweight Championship match could have been lengthened to prevent the early finish. Eck stated the finish to the tag team match was "well done".

== Aftermath ==
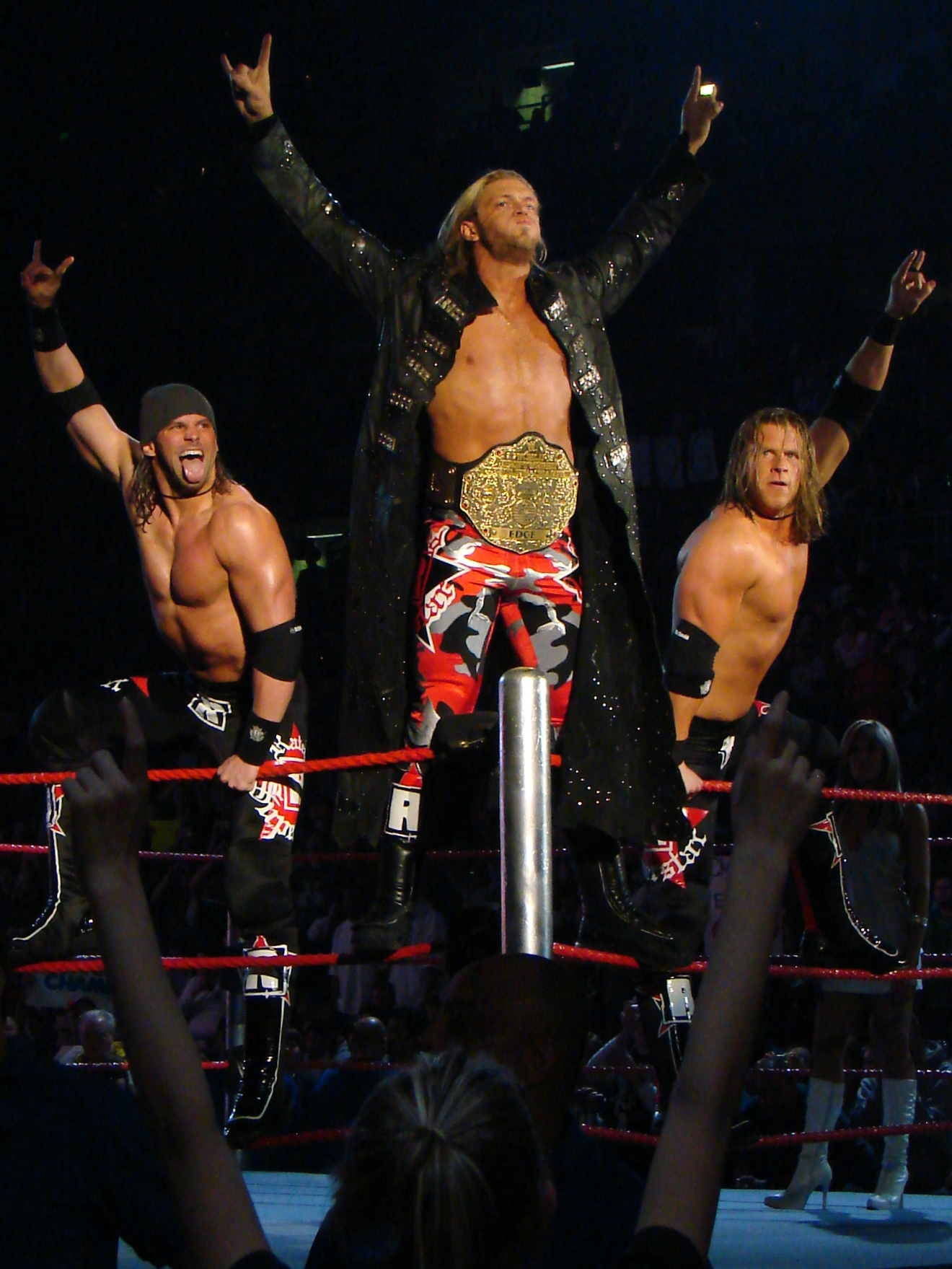
Edge (center) and his new "Edge-Heads", Curt Hawkins and Zack Ryder

After Armageddon, the feud between Randy Orton and Chris Jericho slowly died down. Jericho once again defeated Orton on the Tribute to the Troops Raw by disqualification when former SmackDown! announcer John "Bradshaw" Layfield (JBL) entered the ring. After Jericho requested JBL's presence on the December 17 episode of Raw, JBL was outraged, left SmackDown!, and announced his return to Raw to wrestle after a one-and-a-half-year retirement. The two began a feud with each other and had a match at the Royal Rumble in Madison Square Garden which JBL won by disqualification, when Jericho hit JBL with a steel chair.

The feud between the World Heavyweight Champion Edge and Batista continued the following week on SmackDown!, where Batista challenged Edge to a title rematch, but the general manager Vickie Guerrero announced that it was a three-on-one title match with the Major Brothers (rechristened as the "Edge-heads" earlier that night) siding with Edge. After Batista pinned one of the Edge-heads, Guerrero announced that Batista could only become the champion by pinning Edge. After Guerrero restarted the match, Batista took advantage, and went to hit Edge with a Batista Bomb, but Curt Hawkins hit Batista in the leg with a steel chair, resulting in the entire team being disqualified. Due to the fact a title cannot be won when the champion loses by disqualification Edge retained the title. Rey Mysterio won a Beat the Clock match series and earned himself a match against Edge for the World Heavyweight Championship at the Royal Rumble, but Edge retained his title against Mysterio with help from Vickie Guerrero.

Randy Orton began a feud with the new number one contender for his WWE Championship, the WWE Intercontinental Champion Jeff Hardy who earned himself a title shot by defeating Triple H in a number one contender's match at Armageddon. Orton gave Jeff's brother Matt, a running punt to the gut and then one to the head. Two weeks later, Jeff hit Orton with a Swanton Bomb from the top of a 30-foot high scaffolding which knocked out both Orton and Hardy and they were taken off on stretchers. At the Royal Rumble, Orton retained his title against Hardy after pinning Hardy following an RKO.

The 2007 Armageddon was the last WWE PPV to air in 4:3 format, as starting with the January 21, 2008, episode of Raw, all WWE shows switched to the high definition (720p) format.

== Results ==
No.	Results	Stipulations	Times
1^{D}	Jesse and Festus defeated John Morrison and The Miz by pinfall	Tag team match	10:30
2	Rey Mysterio defeated MVP (c) by countout	Singles match for the WWE United States Championship	11:29
3	Big Daddy V and Mark Henry (with Matt Striker) defeated CM Punk and Kane by pinfall	Tag team match	10:33
4	Shawn Michaels defeated Mr. Kennedy by pinfall	Singles match	15:16
5	Jeff Hardy defeated Triple H by pinfall	Singles match to determine the #1 contender to the WWE Championship at Royal Rumble	15:23
6	Finlay (with Hornswoggle) defeated The Great Khali (with Ranjin Singh) by pinfall	Singles match	06:02
7	Chris Jericho defeated Randy Orton (c) by disqualification	Singles match for the WWE Championship	15:05
8	Beth Phoenix (c) defeated Mickie James by pinfall	Singles match for the WWE Women's Championship	04:45
9	Edge defeated Batista (c) and The Undertaker by pinfall	Triple threat match for the World Heavyweight Championship	13:00
(c) / – the champion(s) heading into the match; D / – this was a dark match
