= Armageddon (2006) =

World Wrestling Entertainment pay-per-view event

- Promotional poster featuring Batista
- Promotion: World Wrestling Entertainment
- Brand: SmackDown!
- Date: December 17, 2006
- City: Richmond, Virginia
- Venue: Richmond Coliseum
- Attendance: 8,200
- Buy rate: 239,000
- Tagline: The End...Is Only the Beginning

Pay-per-view chronology
← Previous; December to Dismember	Next → New Year's Revolution

Armageddon chronology
← Previous; 2005	Next → 2007

The 2006 Armageddon was a professional wrestling pay-per-view (PPV) event produced by World Wrestling Entertainment (WWE). It was the seventh Armageddon and took place on December 17, 2006, at the Richmond Coliseum in Richmond, Virginia, held exclusively for wrestlers from the promotion's SmackDown! brand division. It was the final Armageddon to be brand-exclusive as following WrestleMania 23 the following year, brand-exclusive PPVs were discontinued.

The main event was a tag team match, in which the team of Batista and Raw's John Cena defeated the team of King Booker and Finlay. Two featured bouts were scheduled on the undercard, including The Undertaker versus Mr. Kennedy in a Last Ride match, which The Undertaker won. The other match was an Inferno match in which Kane defeated Montel Vontavious Porter.

The event grossed over US$423,500 in ticket sales from an attendance of 8,200. Canadian Online Explorer's professional wrestling section rated the WWE Tag Team Championship match a nine out of ten stars, the highest rated match. The event was released on DVD on January 16, 2007, by Sony Music Entertainment. The DVD reached second on Billboard's DVD Sales Chart for recreational sports during the week of February 18, 2007, and it dropped to the tenth spot the following week.

== Production ==
=== Background ===
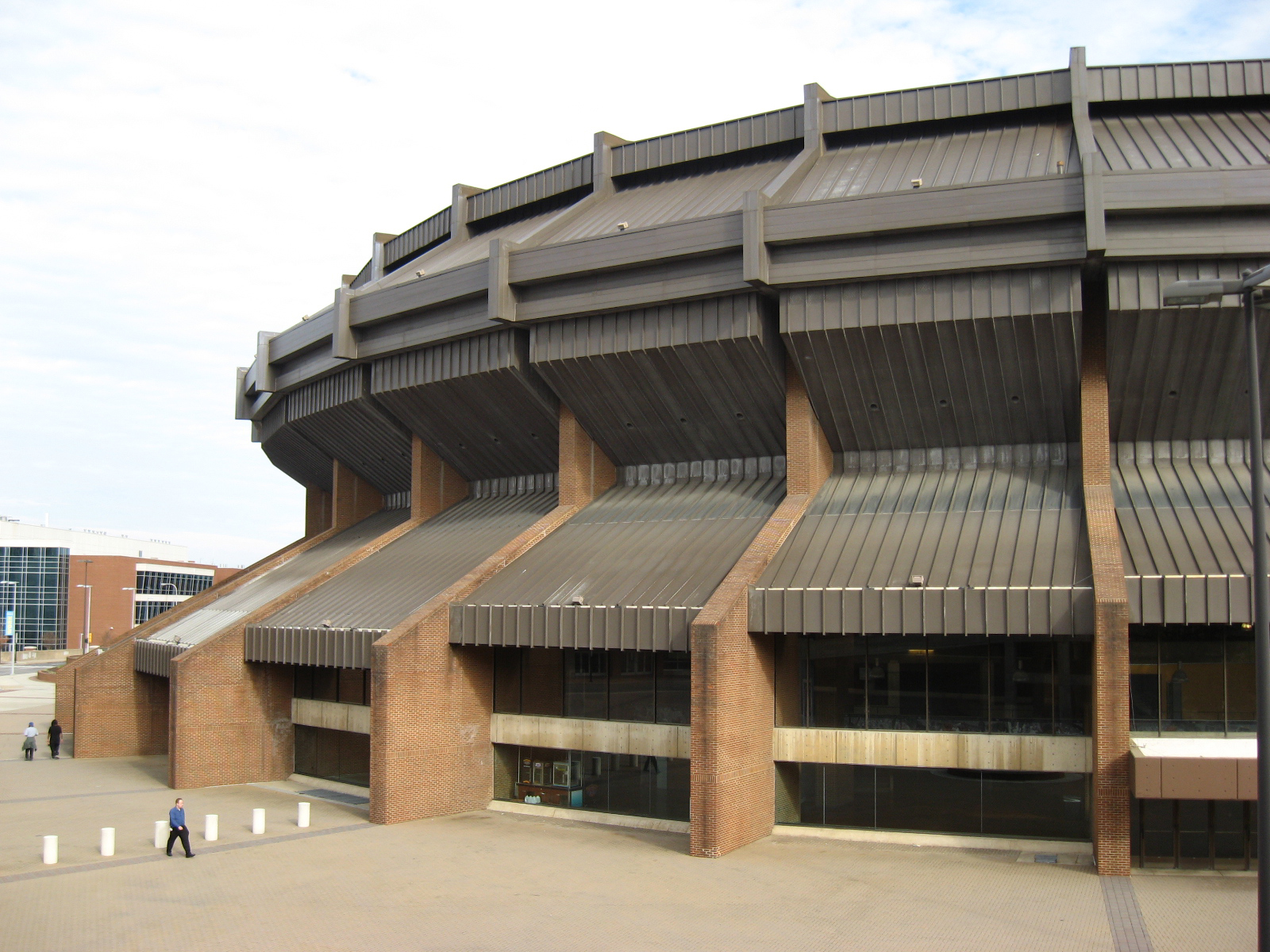
The seventh Armageddon was held at the Richmond Coliseum in Richmond, Virginia.

Armageddon was a professional wrestling pay-per-view (PPV) event established by World Wrestling Entertainment (WWE) in 1999 and held every December except in 2001. The seventh event was held on December 17, 2006, at the Richmond Coliseum in Richmond, Virginia. Like the previous two years, the 2006 event featured wrestlers exclusively from the SmackDown! brand.

=== Storylines ===
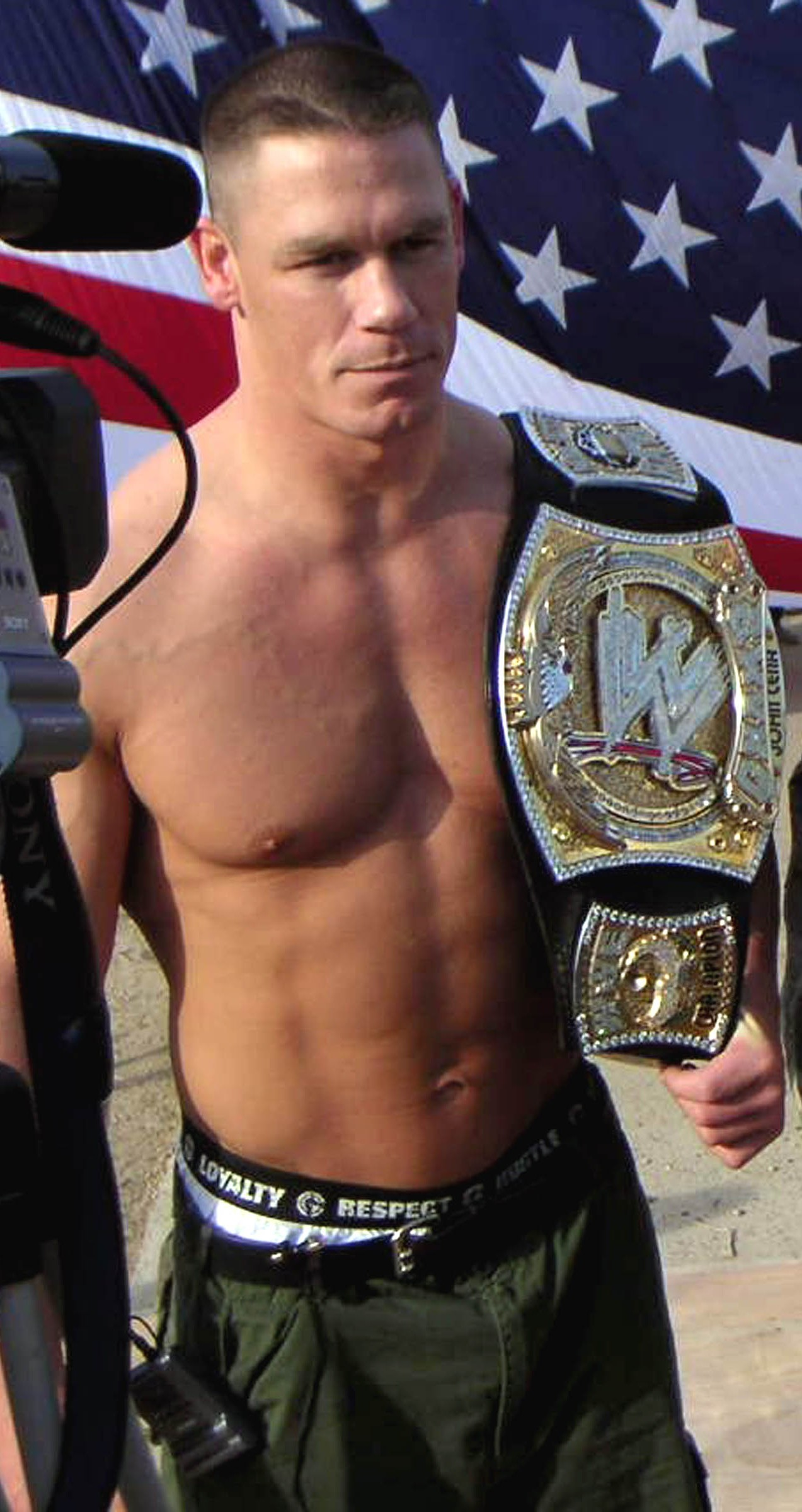
Raw's WWE Champion John Cena teamed up with Batista against King Booker and Finlay

The leading staged rivalry written into the event was between Batista and King Booker. At Survivor Series, Batista defeated King Booker to win the World Heavyweight Championship. On the December 1 episode of SmackDown!, King Booker and Finlay both competed in a Triple Threat match against Batista for the World Heavyweight Championship, with Batista winning. Later that night, General manager Theodore Long announced that King Booker and Finlay would form a tag team to compete against Batista and a partner of his choice at Armageddon. Batista announced that his partner would be WWE Champion John Cena, a member of the Raw brand. The following week on the December 8 episode of SmackDown!, Batista defeated Finlay by disqualification after King Booker interfered on Finlay's behalf. On the December 15 episode of SmackDown!, Cena defeated Finlay after an FU.

The secondary rivalry was between The Undertaker and Mr. Kennedy. On the September 8 episode of SmackDown!, Kennedy announced that he was looking for a new opponent, one that he had never faced before. Long informed Kennedy that he knew a SmackDown! superstar that had never faced Kennedy, The Undertaker. A match was made between the two for No Mercy, in which Kennedy defeated The Undertaker by disqualification. At Survivor Series, Kennedy once again defeated The Undertaker in a First Blood match. On the December 1 episode of SmackDown!, The Undertaker fought Montel Vontavious Porter (MVP) in a match where neither wrestler won. During the match, MVP attempted to escape from the ring, but Kennedy caught him during the process and tried to throw him back into the ring. MVP instead threw Kennedy in. The Undertaker then kicked Kennedy in the face, and Kane attacked MVP at ringside. The following week as Kennedy was in the ring, the hearse, appearing to have nobody in the driver's seat, drove into the arena; suddenly, The Undertaker appeared from the back of the hearse, as Kennedy sprung from the ring. Later that night, Kane defeated Kennedy by disqualification after MVP interfered on Kennedy's behalf. On the December 15 episode of SmackDown!, Undertaker and Kane teamed together to face Kennedy and MVP in a tag team match, which ended with neither team winning. Kennedy knocked Kane down in the aisle and jumped into the driver's seat of the hearse that had been at ringside for the match and threatened to run him over with it; However, The Undertaker appeared in the passenger side seat scaring Kennedy off.

The third rivalry was between Montel Vontavious Porter (MVP) and Kane. After MVP signed with the SmackDown! brand and made his debut, he begged Theodore Long for more competition. Kane answered the challenge, but MVP got himself disqualified when he low blowed Kane to escape Kane's chokeslam. Over the past few months, MVP defeated Kane in a street fight with help from Mr. Kennedy (who was feuding with The Undertaker) and later defeated Kane in a steel cage match by escaping the cage. Theodore Long later announced that since MVP and Kane were so evenly matched that the two would face off at Armageddon in an Inferno match.

== Event ==
Other on-screen personnel
Role:	Name:
English commentators	Michael Cole
English commentators	John Bradshaw Layfield
Spanish commentators	Carlos Cabrera
Spanish commentators	Hugo Savinovich
Ring announcer	Tony Chimel
Referees	Nick Patrick
Referees	Charles Robinson
Referees	Jim Korderas

=== Preliminary matches ===
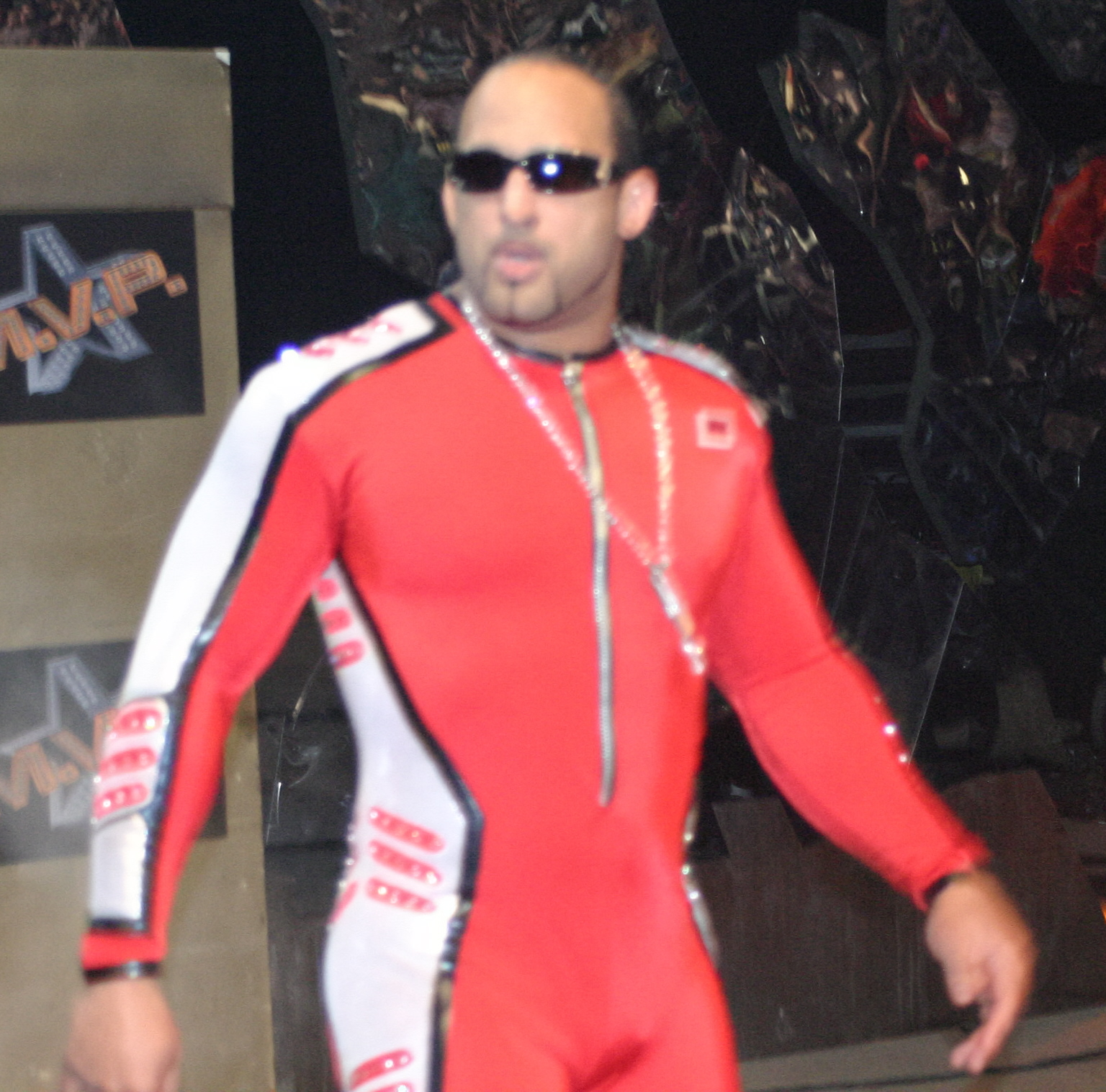
Montel Vontavious Porter, who faced Kane in an Inferno match

The first match to air live was between Kane and Montel Vontavious Porter (MVP) in an Inferno match. The only way to win an Inferno match is by throwing one's opponent into a fire that surrounds the ring on all four sides. This match was the first time that the Inferno match had been used on pay-per-view in more than seven years. At the start of the match, MVP attempted to leave the ring, but was unable to as the flames surrounding the ring prevented him. Kane kicked MVP in the head and threw him into the ring corner. MVP escaped the ring and was unable to go past the fire, so he returned to the ring and was continuously knocked down by Kane. The finish of the match saw Kane grab MVP and force him backwards into the fire. MVP's costume caught on fire as he ran to the entrance ramp. MVP fell to the floor as WWE workers put out the flames with fire extinguishers.

The following match featured Paul London and Brian Kendrick, William Regal and Dave Taylor, MNM (Joey Mercury and Johnny Nitro), and The Hardys (Matt Hardy and Jeff Hardy) in a four-team ladder match for the WWE Tag Team Championship. Towards the end of the match, while MNM and The Hardys were out of the ring, Regal and Taylor attempted to climb the ladder, but Kendrick managed to knock the pair off. Kendrick fought off Regal and Taylor as London climbed the ladder and captured the titles to win the match for his team and retain the championships. During the match, Mercury suffered a legitimate nose injury after being hit by a ladder.

I happened to be looking up, so it hit me in the throat. But Mercury was looking straight at it and it hit him square in the nose and the orbital bone. It really could have been any one of us. I was just lucky that the ladder hit him first.

— Johnny Nitro,

I'll always remember [the match] for what we did to Joey Mercury's face. After the seesaw, I remember hearing him yell, "I'm bleeding," and it was like someone went to a sink and turned the faucet on. It was gruesome.

— Matt Hardy,

The third match was a standard wrestling match between The Boogeyman and The Miz. The Boogeyman controlled the majority of the match and eventually won by pinfall after a Falling Chokebomb.

The next match featured Chris Benoit defending the United States Championship against Chavo Guerrero (accompanied by Vickie Guerrero). Before the bell rang to start the match, Chavo tried to attack Benoit, but as the match began, Benoit retaliated by delivering a clothesline. Benoit and Guerrero wrestled inconclusively until Benoit covered Chavo to try to pin him. Chavo managed to place his foot on top of the bottom rope, which forced Benoit to break the pin per official wrestling match rules. While Guerrero was lying on his stomach, Benoit applied the Sharpshooter, and made Chavo submit to retain the championship.

The fifth match was the encounter of Gregory Helms and Jimmy Wang Yang for the WWE Cruiserweight Championship. Helms performed a swinging neckbreaker on Yang. Yang retaliated, but Helms quickly moved back into the power position and pinned Yang to retain the championship.

=== Main event matches ===
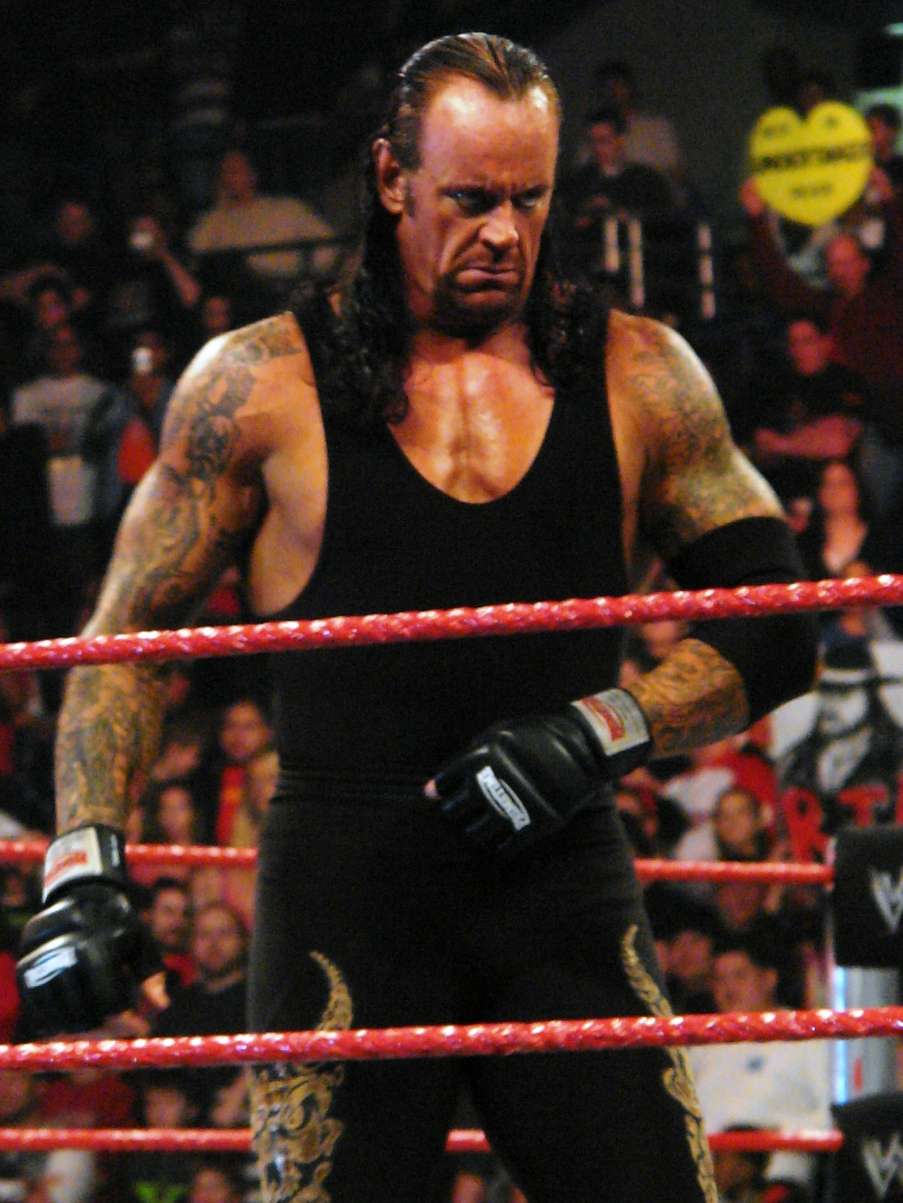
The Undertaker, who faced Mr. Kennedy in a Last Ride match at Armageddon

The following match was a Last Ride match between The Undertaker and Mr. Kennedy, where the only way to win was by throwing one's opponent into a hearse and driving it out of the arena. During the beginning of the match, The Undertaker tossed Kennedy into steel steps on the side of the ring and then onto the commentator's announcing table. The Undertaker then threw Kennedy into the ring apron, which is the apron covering the area under the ring. Kennedy and The Undertaker wrestled inconclusively until The Undertaker tossed Kennedy on top of the roof of the hearse. The Undertaker then delivered a Chokeslam and a Tombstone Piledriver, both onto the roof of the hearse. As he was still in control of the match, The Undertaker threw Kennedy into the hearse and drove it out of the arena to win the match.

After the Last Ride match, Jillian Hall, Layla El, Ashley Massaro, and Kristal Marshall all took part in a "Naughty or Nice" contest, a lingerie contest, where the Diva with the loudest fan reaction would win. The host of the contest was Santa Claus (portrayed by Big Dick Johnson, otherwise Christopher DeJoseph). Johnson declared all four of the Divas as the winners and proceeded to take off his Santa costume and dance to music being played in the arena.

The main event was the tag team match between John Cena and Batista versus the team of King Booker and Finlay. Batista wrestled the match with his left arm taped up due to a previous injury. Both teams wrestlers inconclusively until Cena applied the STFU on King Booker. Finlay broke the submission hold, and The Little Bastard ran into the ring. Little Bastard attempted to kick Cena, but accidentally kicked himself in his head when Cena moved out of the way. Then, King Booker tried to superkick Batista, but Batista moved out of the way, and King Booker accidentally hit Finlay. Batista then delivered a Batista Bomb and pinned King Booker to earn the victory for his team.

== Reception ==
The Richmond Coliseum has a maximum capacity of 13,000, but that was reduced for the 2006 Armageddon event. The event grossed over $423,500 in ticket sales from an attendance of 8,200. Canadian Online Explorer's professional wrestling section rated the WWE Tag Team Championship match a nine out of ten stars, the highest match rating. The United States Championship, Cruiserweight Championship, and Last Ride matches all received seven out of ten stars. The main event match received a five and a half stars out of ten rating.

The event was released on DVD on January 16, 2007, by Sony Music Entertainment. The DVD reached second on Billboard's DVD Sales Chart for recreational sports during the week of February 18, 2007, and it dropped to the tenth spot the following week. It remained on the chart's "top ten" for two consecutive weeks until the week of March 4, 2007, when it ranked 17th.

== Aftermath ==
On the December 22 episode of SmackDown!, King Booker and Finlay demanded a rematch against Batista and John Cena. General Manager Theodore Long informed the pair that they would instead be facing Kane and The Undertaker later that night in a match, which Kane and The Undertaker won. At the Royal Rumble, the Royal Rumble match was held, where the winner is the final person left in the ring after the other twenty nine wrestlers are eliminated by being thrown over the top ring rope. The Undertaker won the Royal Rumble match to earn a title shot at WrestleMania 23. At WrestleMania, he defeated Batista to win the World Heavyweight Championship and maintain his WrestleMania undefeated streak.

Chris Benoit continued to feud with Chavo Guerrero over the WWE United States Championship. On the December 22, 2006 episode of SmackDown!, Benoit defeated Guerrero in a rematch for the title, with Vickie Guerrero accompanying Chavo to ringside. Benoit won the match by disqualification when Vickie hit Benoit in the head with the championship belt. On the January 12, 2007 episode of SmackDown!, Mr. Kennedy defeated Chris Benoit in a standard match, with help from Chavo Guerrero. The following week, Benoit defeated Chavo yet again with the championship on the line.

The feuds between Kane and Montel Vontavious Porter (MVP), and The Undertaker and Mr. Kennedy did not continue after the event. On the January 5, 2007, episode of SmackDown!, Kennedy set the time to beat in the "Beat the Clock" sprint, a tournament based on the time wrestlers win matches, to become the new number one contender for the World Heavyweight Championship. On the January 12 episode of SmackDown!, Kennedy won the "Beat the Clock" sprint by preventing The Undertaker from winning his match and from beating Kennedy's time. At the Royal Rumble, Batista defeated Kennedy to retain the title. The feuds between Gregory Helms and Jimmy Wang Yang, and The Boogeyman and The Miz also did not continue, as Helms was put into a rivalry with The Boogeyman. Yang was put into a temporary rivalry with Tatanka.

The 2006 Armageddon was the final brand-exclusive Armageddon, as following WrestleMania 23 in April 2007, brand-exclusive PPVs were discontinued.

== Results ==
No.	Results	Stipulations	Times
1^{D}	Vladimir Kozlov defeated Scotty 2 Hotty by pinfall	Singles match	2:01
2	Kane defeated Montel Vontavious Porter by burning	Inferno match	8:14
3	Paul London and Brian Kendrick (c) defeated William Regal and Dave Taylor, MNM (Joey Mercury and Johnny Nitro) (with Melina) and The Hardys (Matt Hardy and Jeff Hardy)	Fatal four-way ladder match for the WWE Tag Team Championship	20:13
4	The Boogeyman defeated The Miz by pinfall	Singles match	2:51
5	Chris Benoit (c) defeated Chavo Guerrero (with Vickie Guerrero) by submission	Singles match for the WWE United States Championship	12:14
6	Gregory Helms (c) defeated Jimmy Wang Yang by pinfall	Singles match for the WWE Cruiserweight Championship	10:51
7	The Undertaker defeated Mr. Kennedy	Last Ride match	19:49
8	Kristal Marshall vs. Layla El vs. Jillian Hall vs. Ashley Massaro ended in a draw (Everyone won via "Santa's Choice")	4-Way Santa's little helpers Lingerie Contest	6:00
9	John Cena and Batista defeated King Booker's Court (King Booker and Finlay) (with Queen Sharmell) by pinfall	Tag team match	11:29
(c) / – the champion(s) heading into the match; D / – this was a dark match
