= Armageddon (2003) =

World Wrestling Entertainment pay-per-view event

- Promotional poster featuring Triple H
- Promotion: World Wrestling Entertainment
- Brand: Raw
- Date: December 14, 2003
- City: Orlando, Florida
- Venue: TD Waterhouse Centre
- Attendance: 12,672
- Buy rate: 200,000
- Tagline: Evolution of The Game

Pay-per-view chronology
| ← Previous; Survivor Series | Next → Royal Rumble |

Armageddon chronology
| ← Previous; 2002 | Next → 2004 |

The 2003 Armageddon was a professional wrestling pay-per-view (PPV) event produced by World Wrestling Entertainment (WWE). It was the fourth Armageddon and took place on December 14, 2003, at the TD Waterhouse Centre in Orlando, Florida. It was held exclusively for wrestlers from the promotion's Raw brand division, which made it the first brand-exclusive Armageddon after the previous year's event also featured wrestlers from SmackDown!.

The main event was a Triple Threat match for the World Heavyweight Championship between Kane, Triple H, and champion Goldberg. Triple H won the match and the World Heavyweight Championship after pinning Goldberg following a chokeslam from Kane. The undercard included Randy Orton winning the Intercontinental Championship from Rob Van Dam, Evolution (Bautista and Ric Flair) winning the World Tag Team Championship from The Dudley Boyz (Bubba Ray Dudley and D-Von Dudley), and Shawn Michaels defeating Batista.

The event grossed US$450,000 with 9,000 ticket sales and received 200,000 pay-per-view buys. Armageddon was met with a generally negative critical reception. The event was claimed to be a "flop" by Canadian Online Explorer's professional wrestling event section. They rated the overall event a one out of ten. When the event was released on DVD, it reached a peak position of second on Billboard's DVD sales chart for recreational sports. It remained on the chart for four consecutive weeks.

== Production ==
=== Background ===
Armageddon was a professional wrestling pay-per-view (PPV) event established by World Wrestling Entertainment (WWE) in 1999 and held every December except in 2001. The fourth event was held on December 14, 2003, at the TD Waterhouse Centre in Orlando, Florida. While the previous year's event featured wrestlers from both the Raw and SmackDown! brands, the 2003 event was held exclusively for Raw, which made it the first brand-exclusive Armageddon.

=== Storylines ===
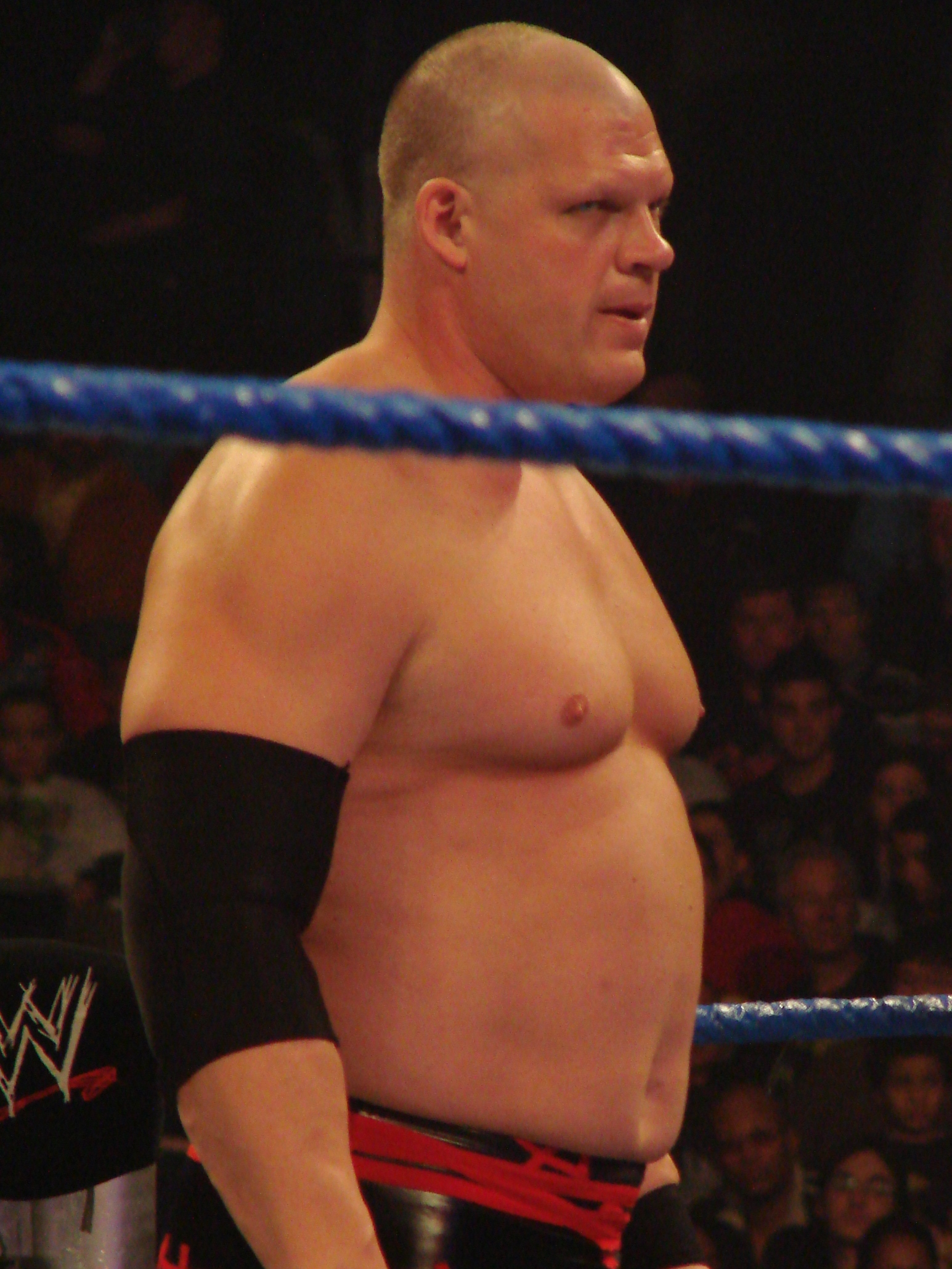
Kane faced Goldberg and Triple H for the World Heavyweight Championship

The main feud heading into the event was between Goldberg, Kane, and Triple H over the World Heavyweight Championship. At Survivor Series, Goldberg retained the World Heavyweight Championship against Triple H. On the November 17 episode of Raw, Kane became involved in the feud between Goldberg and Triple H after attacking Goldberg following a Handicap match. On the November 24 episode of Raw, Kane interfered in a title match between Triple H and Goldberg. After the match, General Manager Eric Bischoff scheduled Goldberg to defend the World Heavyweight Championship against Triple H and Kane in a Triple Threat match at Armageddon.

Another primary feud heading into the event was between Randy Orton and Rob Van Dam over the WWE Intercontinental Championship. Van Dam won the title on the September 29 episode of Raw by defeating then-champion Christian. On the November 17 episode of Raw, during a match between Ric Flair and Van Dam, Orton interfered and executed an RKO on Van Dam. Later that night, Orton was granted an Intercontinental Championship match against Van Dam at Armageddon. On the December 8 episode of Raw, Co-General Manager Mick Foley appointed himself as the special guest referee for the match.

One of the predominant matches on the card was Batista versus Shawn Michaels. Their feud first started when Batista attacked Michaels during his elimination match at Survivor Series, with "Stone Cold" Steve Austin's career on the line, costing Team Austin the match. On the November 24 episode of Raw, Eric Bischoff scheduled a match between the two for Armageddon. Later that night, Michaels and Chris Jericho defeated Batista and Ric Flair in a tag team match. Towards the end of the match, Jericho turned on Michaels and superkicked him. Michaels landed on Flair as a result and got the pinfall to win the match for himself and Jericho. After the match, however, Batista executed a powerbomb on Michaels.

== Event ==
Other on-screen personnel
| Role: | Name: |
|---|---|
| English commentators | Jim Ross |
| English commentators | Jerry Lawler |
| Spanish commentators | Carlos Cabrera |
| Spanish commentators | Hugo Savinovich |
| Ring announcer | Lilian Garcia |
| Referees | Charles Robinson |
| Referees | Mike Chioda |
| Referees | Jack Doan |
| Referees | Earl Hebner |
| Referees | Chad Patton |

Before the live broadcast of the event began, Rico defeated Heidenreich in a match that aired on Sunday Night Heat, a 30-minute pre-show for the event. The event began with Lilian Garcia singing "The Star-Spangled Banner".

=== Preliminary matches ===
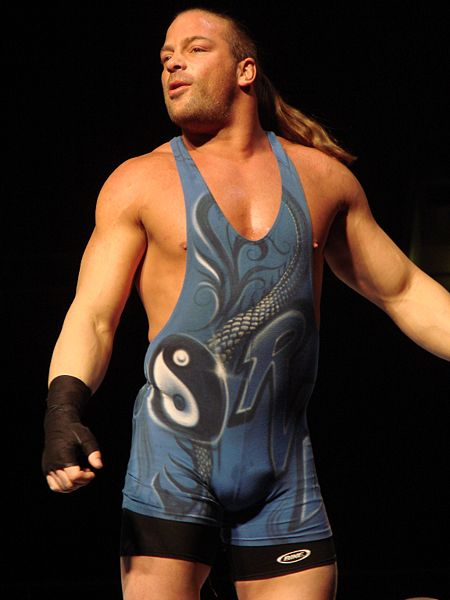
Rob Van Dam lost his WWE Intercontinental Championship to Randy Orton

In the opening match, Booker T faced Mark Henry. Henry controlled most of the match, as he was able to execute a spinebuster and apply various submission holds on Booker T. Booker T executed a scissors kick to win.

Next, Rob Van Dam defended the WWE Intercontinental Championship against Randy Orton with Mick Foley as special guest referee. The match contained many notable spots, including an elevated spike DDT by Orton on Van Dam, and a rolling thunder by Van Dam. Ric Flair, who accompanied Orton, attempted to interfere many times but was stopped by Foley. Orton pinned Van Dam after an RKO to win the match and the championship.

In an Intergender tag team match billed as the "Battle of the Sexes", Chris Jericho and Christian faced off against Trish Stratus and Lita. The match went back and forth, as each team was able to gain the advantage. In the end, Christian pinned Stratus with a roll-up to win the match for himself and Jericho.

After this, Shawn Michaels wrestled Batista. Near the end of the match, Batista executed a series of spinebusters on Michaels and attempted a powerbomb but Michaels escaped the attempt and executed a Superkick and pinned Batista. However, replays showed that Batista's shoulder was up, while Michaels was the one who had his shoulders on the mat. Batista initially believed that he had won the match.

Next, Maven and Matt Hardy came out for their scheduled match but attacked one another outside the ring. Hardy threw Maven into the ring, where a furious Batista attacked Maven and executed a powerbomb. As Maven could not compete, the referee canceled his match against Hardy.

=== Main event matches ===
A Tag Team Turmoil match for the World Tag Team Championship followed. Two of the overall seven teams started the match, with another team entering the match once one was eliminated. The Hurricane and Rosey started the match against La Résistance (Robért Conway and René Duprée). Hurricane eliminated La Résistance after pinning Conway following a Super Hero Splash. Seconds after the elimination, Mark Jindrak came into the ring and rolled up The Hurricane to eliminate him and Rosey. Jindrak and Garrison Cade then faced off against the team of Val Venis and Lance Storm. While Venis was performing a vertical suplex attempt on Jindrak, Cade clipped Venis's legs, which in turn caused Jindrak to fall atop of Venis, scoring a pinfall for his team. The Dudley Boyz (Bubba Ray Dudley and D-Von Dudley) then eliminated Jindrak and Cade and the team of Test and Scott Steiner. Co-General Manager Eric Bischoff, however, introduced Ric Flair and Batista as the seventh and final team to compete. Flair and Batista eliminated the Dudley Boyz to win the match and begin their first reign as World Tag Team Champions.

Next, WWE Women's Champion Molly Holly defended her title against Ivory. Holly pinned Ivory while holding onto her tights for extra leverage to win the match and retain the title.

In the main event, Goldberg defended the World Heavyweight Championship against Kane and Triple H in a Triple Threat match. The match was evenly divided between the three, as every man was able to gain the advantage. Kane performed a Chokeslam onto the broadcast table on Goldberg and Triple H put Goldberg through the broadcast table with an elbow drop off the barricade. In the end, Goldberg performed a spear on Triple H and attempted to get the pinfall, but Kane broke up the attempt and chokeslammed Goldberg after Triple H low blowed Goldberg. Batista came down and pulled Kane out of the ring, which allowed Triple H to pin Goldberg to win the title.

== Reception ==
The event grossed $450,000 with 9,000 ticket sales, and received 200,000 buys, which was less than the 300,000 buys the previous year's event received. The buys from Armageddon helped the promotion's pay-per-view revenue of $13.2 million, which was significantly lower than the prior year's revenue of $21.2 million. Armageddon was met with a generally negative critical reception. Canadian Online Explorer's professional wrestling section claimed that the event was a "flop", rating the overall event a one out of ten. The Triple Threat main event match was rated a one and a half out of ten, while the match between Batista and Shawn Michaels received the highest match rating—a three and a half out of ten.

The event was released on DVD on January 20, 2004. The DVD reached a peak position of second on Billboard's DVD sales chart for recreational sports on February 12, 2004. It remained on the chart for four consecutive weeks, until on March 6, 2004, when it ranked twentieth. The DVD was also reviewed by customers; the average customer rating from Amazon.com was three out of five stars.

== Aftermath ==
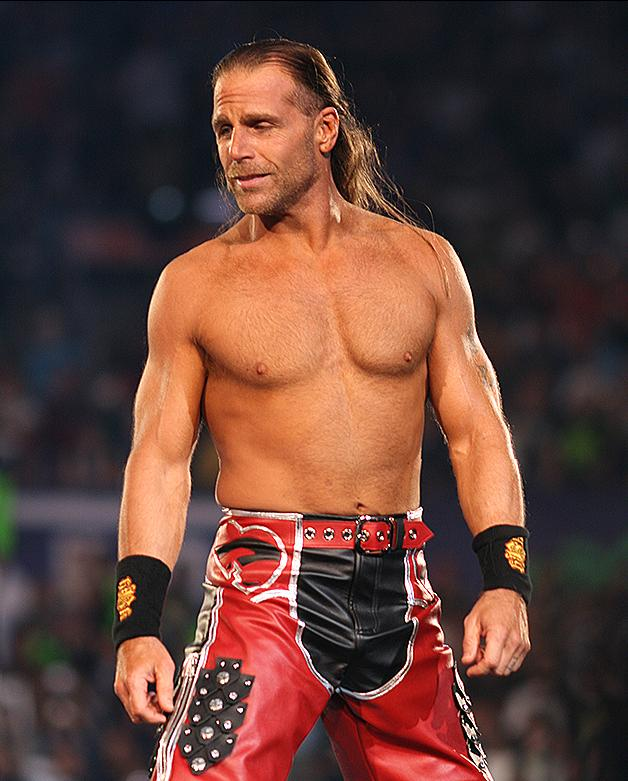
Shawn Michaels began to pursue the World Heavyweight Championship after the event

Randy Orton defeated Rob Van Dam at the event to begin his first reign as WWE Intercontinental Champion, which lasted seven months, the longest reign in over seven years at the time. Orton began feuding with Mick Foley following the event. At the Royal Rumble, Foley eliminated Orton from the Royal Rumble match. After being eliminated, Orton hit Foley with a chair and attacked Foley up the entrance stage. Orton pinned Foley in a Handicap match at WrestleMania XX, and defeated him in a Hardcore match to retain the title at Backlash 2004. Orton finally dropped the title to Edge at Vengeance in July 2004.

Triple H started to feud with Shawn Michaels. At the Royal Rumble, Triple H and Michaels fought to a draw in a Last Man Standing match for the World Heavyweight Championship. The two faced off again, as part of a Triple Threat match, at WrestleMania XX. Chris Benoit, the other participant in the match, forced Triple H to submit to the Crippler Crossface to win the title. Benoit ended the storyline between the three at Backlash, when he defeated Michaels and Triple H in another Triple Threat match.

Batista and Ric Flair's first World Tag Team Championship reign lasted two months, as they lost the titles to Rob Van Dam and Booker T in February. Christian defeated Chris Jericho at WrestleMania XX. After the match, Trish Stratus, Jericho's on-screen girlfriend at the time, turned on Jericho and joined Christian. Jericho, however, went on to defeat the two in a Handicap match at Backlash to conclude their storyline.

While the 2003 Armageddon was held exclusively for the Raw brand, the 2004 event was held exclusively for the SmackDown! brand.

== Results ==
| No. | Results | Stipulations | Times |
|---|---|---|---|
| 1^{H} | Rico (with Miss Jackie) defeated Jon Heidenreich | Singles match | 1:28 |
| 2 | Booker T defeated Mark Henry (with Theodore Long) | Singles match | 9:20 |
| 3 | Randy Orton (with Ric Flair) defeated Rob Van Dam (c) | Singles match for the WWE Intercontinental Championship with Mick Foley as special guest referee | 17:59 |
| 4 | Chris Jericho and Christian defeated Trish Stratus and Lita | Tag team match | 6:37 |
| 5 | Shawn Michaels defeated Batista (with Ric Flair) | Singles match | 12:28 |
| 6 | Evolution (Ric Flair and Batista) won by last eliminating The Dudley Boyz (Bubba Ray and D-Von) (c) | Tag Team Turmoil match for the World Tag Team Championship | 20:48 |
| 7 | Molly Holly (c) defeated Ivory | Singles match for the WWE Women's Championship | 4:23 |
| 8 | Triple H defeated Goldberg (c) and Kane | Triple Threat match for the World Heavyweight Championship | 19:28 |
(c) / – the champion(s) heading into the match; H / – the match was broadcast prior to the pay-per-view on Sunday Night Heat

=== Tag Team Turmoil match ===
| Eliminated | Tag Team | Entered | Eliminated by | Time |
|---|---|---|---|---|
| 1 | La Résistance (Robért Conway and René Duprée) | 2 | Rosey and The Hurricane | 03:16 |
| 2 | Rosey and The Hurricane | 1 | Mark Jindrak and Garrison Cade | 03:34 |
| 3 | Val Venis and Lance Storm | 4 | Mark Jindrak and Garrison Cade | 07:17 |
| 4 | Mark Jindrak and Garrison Cade | 3 | The Dudley Boyz (Bubba Ray Dudley and D-Von Dudley) | 12:29 |
| 5 | Test and Scott Steiner | 6 | The Dudley Boyz (Bubba Ray Dudley and D-Von Dudley) | 16:38 |
| 6 | The Dudley Boyz (Bubba Ray Dudley and D-Von Dudley) | 5 | Evolution (Ric Flair and Batista) | 20:48 |
| N/A | Evolution (Ric Flair and Batista) | 7 | Winners | |
