= Armageddon (2002) =

World Wrestling Entertainment pay-per-view event

- Promotional poster featuring Torrie Wilson
- Promotion: World Wrestling Entertainment
- Brand(s): Raw; SmackDown!
- Date: December 15, 2002
- City: Sunrise, Florida
- Venue: Office Depot Center
- Attendance: 9,000
- Buy rate: 335,000

Pay-per-view chronology
← Previous; Survivor Series	Next → Royal Rumble

Armageddon chronology
← Previous; 2000	Next → 2003

The 2002 Armageddon was a professional wrestling pay-per-view (PPV) event produced by World Wrestling Entertainment (WWE). It was the third Armageddon and took place on December 15, 2002, at the Office Depot Center in Sunrise, Florida, held for wrestlers from the promotion's Raw and SmackDown! brand divisions.

This was the first Armageddon held since 2000, as an originally planned 2001 event was replaced by Vengeance in response to the September 11 attacks as it was felt that the "Armageddon" name might offend the victims of the attacks. The 2002 Vengeance was then moved up to July to allow Armageddon to be reinstated for its usual December slot. It was in turn the first Armageddon held after the introduction of the brand split earlier that year in March, subsequently being the last Armageddon to feature multiple brands until 2007, as beginning with Bad Blood in June 2003, all monthly PPVs outside of the "Big Four" (WrestleMania, SummerSlam, Survivor Series, and Royal Rumble) became brand-exclusive until brand-exclusive PPVs were discontinued after WrestleMania 23 in April 2007. This was also the first Armageddon held under the WWE name after the promotion had been renamed from World Wrestling Federation (WWF) to WWE in May. It was also the second Armageddon at the Office Depot Center, after the inaugural 1999 event when the venue was still known as the National Car Rental Center (renamed during the summer of 2002).

The main match on the Raw brand was a Three Stages of Hell match for the World Heavyweight Championship between champion Shawn Michaels and Triple H. The first match was a Street Fight, which Triple H won after performing a Pedigree. The second match was a Steel cage match, which Michaels won by pinfall after jumping off the top of the steel cage onto Triple H through a table. The third and final match was a Ladder match, which Triple H won after retrieving the belt suspended above the ring. The predominant match on the SmackDown! brand was Big Show versus Kurt Angle for the WWE Championship. Angle won the match and the WWE Championship after pinning Big Show following interference from Brock Lesnar. One of the primary matches on the undercard was Chris Benoit versus Eddie Guerrero, which Benoit won by forcing Guerrero to submit with the Crippler Crossface.

== Production ==
=== Background ===
In the Decembers of 1999 and 2000, World Wrestling Entertainment (WWE), at the time known as the World Wrestling Federation (WWF), held an annual professional wrestling pay-per-view (PPV) event titled Armageddon. The event was originally planned to return in December 2001; however, after the September 11 attacks, the 2001 event was canceled and replaced by Vengeance as the promotion felt that the "Armageddon" name would be offensive to the victims of the attacks. In 2002, Vengeance was moved up to July while Armageddon was reinstated for December, being held on December 15, 2002 at the Office Depot Center in Sunrise, a suburb of Fort Lauderdale, Florida. It was the second Armageddon at the venue, after the inaugural 1999 event when the venue was still known as the National Car Rental Center (renamed during the summer of 2002).

The 2002 event was the first Armageddon held under the WWE name, as earlier that year in May, the promotion was renamed from WWF to WWE. It was also the first Armageddon to be held after the introduction of the brand extension in March, where the promotion divided its roster between the Raw and SmackDown! brands where wrestlers were exclusively assigned to perform. The 2002 event featured wrestlers from both brands.

=== Storylines ===
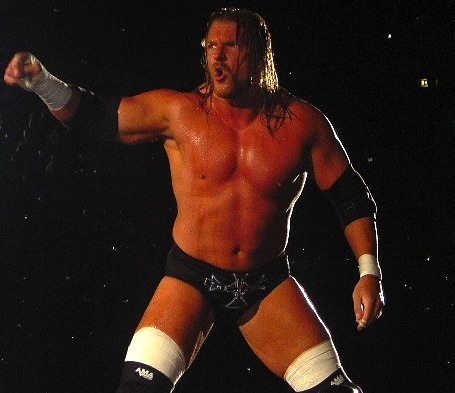
Triple H challenged Shawn Michaels for Raw's World Heavyweight Championship in a Three Stages of Hell match

The main feud heading into Armageddon on the Raw brand was between Shawn Michaels and Triple H, with the two feuding over the World Heavyweight Championship. At SummerSlam, Michaels defeated Triple H in an unsanctioned street fight after pinning him with a jackknife hold. Three months later at Survivor Series, Michaels won the Elimination Chamber match by last eliminating Triple H to win the World Heavyweight Championship. On the November 25 episode of Raw, Michaels made his first successful title defense against Rob Van Dam after interference from Triple H. On the December 2 episode of Raw, Triple H defeated Van Dam in a number one contender's match with Michaels as the special guest referee, earning a championship match against Michaels at Armageddon. Afterwards, the two brawled with one another, ending with Michaels nailing Triple H with Sweet Chin Music. On the December 9 episode of Raw, Raw General Manager Eric Bischoff announced that the match between the two at Armageddon would be a Three Stages of Hell match, where the first fall would be a street fight, the second fall would be a steel cage match, and the third fall (if necessary) would be a ladder match.

The main feud on the SmackDown! brand was between Big Show and Kurt Angle, with the two battling over the WWE Championship. The previous month at Survivor Series, Big Show challenged Brock Lesnar for the WWE Championship. During the match when Lesnar tried to pin Big Show to retain the title, his manager Paul Heyman turned on him, pulling the referee out of the ring, allowing Big Show to chokeslam Lesnar onto a steel chair and win the championship, handing him his first pinfall loss in WWE. On the November 21 episode of SmackDown!, Lesnar checked the locker room to look for Big Show and Heyman until Matt Hardy insulted Lesnar about his loss at Survivor Series. Lesnar responded by throwing Hardy through the wall. Moments later, SmackDown! General Manager Stephanie McMahon informed Lesnar that he would not get his rematch for the WWE Championship until his ribs (that were still injured when Big Show tossed him off the stage on the November 7 episode of SmackDown!) were healed. She then stated that she would be forced to suspend Lesnar if he would lay his hands on Heyman, Big Show, or any other SmackDown! wrestler. During the segment between Heyman and Big Show, Heyman explained that Lesnar would not get a rematch, as per a special clause that he snuck into his contract. Shortly after, Lesnar went after the two with a steel chair and nailed Big Show with it. Later that night, Big Show defended his title against Edge, which ended in a no contest when Heyman interfered. Afterwards, Lesnar came to the ring, gave Big Show an F-5 and then chased Heyman backstage until Heyman took off in a limousine. On the November 28 episode of SmackDown!, McMahon suspended Lesnar for ignoring her orders twice the previous week. Later that night, Lesnar would still come out and hit an F-5 on Big Show through the announce table, then once again tried to go after Heyman until McMahon brought officers out to get Lesnar out of the arena. On the December 5 episode of SmackDown!, Angle defeated Edge, Chris Benoit, and Eddie Guerrero in a fatal four-way elimination match to become the number one contender for the WWE Championship at Armageddon. Shortly after the match ended, Big Show, accompanied by Heyman, came out and chokeslammed Angle. On the December 12 episode of SmackDown!, Angle interrupted Lesnar's autograph session to inform Lesnar that he would get his suspension lifted if Lesnar helped him defeat Big Show at Armageddon, with Lesnar saying he would think about it. However, McMahon informed Big Show and Heyman that Lesnar's suspension had been lifted.

== Event ==
Other on-screen personnel
Role:	Name:
English commentators	Jim Ross (Raw)
English commentators	Jerry Lawler (Raw)
English commentators	Michael Cole (SmackDown)
English commentators	Tazz (SmackDown)
Spanish commentators	Carlos Cabrera
Spanish commentators	Hugo Savinovich
Interviewer	Jonathan Coachman
Ring announcer	Howard Finkel (Raw)
Ring announcer	Tony Chimel (SmackDown)
Referees	Charles Robinson (Raw)
Referees	Nick Patrick (Raw)
Referees	Earl Hebner (Raw)
Referees	Jim Korderas (SmackDown)
Referees	Brian Hebner (SmackDown)
Referees	Mike Chioda (SmackDown)
Referees	Jack Doan (Raw)
Referees	Mike Sparks (SmackDown)
Referees	Chad Patton (Raw)

=== Preliminary matches ===
The event unofficially began with a dark match between Jeff Hardy and D'Lo Brown. Hardy pinned Brown after a Diving Crossbody. The first match of the event was a Fatal Four-Way tag team match for the World Tag Team Championship between Chris Jericho and Christian, Lance Storm and William Regal, The Dudley Boyz (Bubba Ray Dudley and D-Von Dudley), and Booker T and Goldust. Jericho and Christian started the match off with the Dudley Boyz, though both Booker T and Goldust and Storm and Regal were involved early and often. The first team to go were the Dudley Boyz; Bubba Ray was pinned by Regal, after a top rope leg drop by Storm. The second elimination was Storm and Regal; Goldust pinned Regal after a Director's Cut, which made the match even at two-on-two. The final elimination came when Booker T hit a Book End on Jericho, which allowed Booker T to pin him and get the win for his team. As a result, Booker T and Goldust became the new World Tag Team Champions.

The second match was between Edge and A-Train. A-Train started the match and dominated Edge as he gave him a slam the corner, which was followed by a shoulder block. A-Train tried another slam on Edge, but Edge countered and tossed A-Train out of the ring. A-Train gained the advantage once more, when he catapulted Edge right into the ropes and nearly decapitated him, A-Train then got Edge in the headlock in the middle of the ring, but Edge dropped down and delivered a DDT to break free. Edge then took the upper hand as he got up and knocked A-Train down with a spinning heel kick, which was followed by a facebuster from the middle rope. The match came to an end when, A-Train was disqualified for hitting Edge with a chair. As a result, Edge won the match. Afterwards, Edge hit A-Train with a chair seven times.

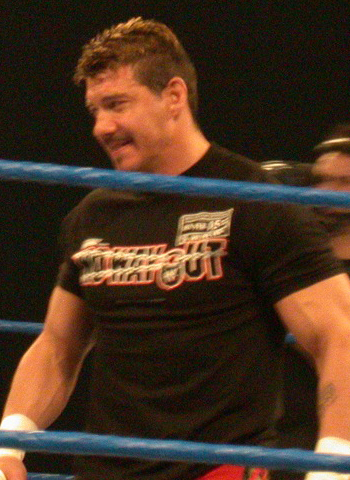
Eddie Guerrero, who faced off against Chris Benoit

The third match was between Chris Benoit and Eddie Guerrero. In the match, Benoit whipped Guerrero down and applied a reverse chinlock. Guerrero managed to get out of the hold, as he kicked Benoit in the midsection. Guerrero got Benoit down on the mat and locked him in a head-scissors. Benoit countered the move and got Guerrero in a hold, but Guerrero was able to get the rope, to break the hold. After back-and-forth action between Benoit and Guerrero, Benoit forced Guerrero to submit to the Crippler Crossface.

The fourth match was between Kane and Batista (with Ric Flair). Kane and Batista locked up in the middle of the ring and Batista took the upper hand over Kane, as he delivered a shoulder block. Batista then picked up Kane and slammed him, but Kane was able to drive his elbow onto him. In the match however Kane stopped Flair's interference. Kane slammed Batista into the turnbuckle, which was followed by a big boot to the face. The match came to an end when Batista delivered the Batista Bomb on Kane and grabbed the pinfall.

The fifth match was for the WWE Women's Championship between Victoria, Trish Stratus and Jacqueline. Victoria ran down to the ring, but was quickly tossed out by Jacqueline. Jacqueline took the advantage, as she hit a sweep kick on Victoria. Soon after, Trish attempted a bulldog on Jacqueline, but Jacqueline and Victoria double-teamed her with a back suplex. Mid-way in the match, Trish dominated and delivered multiple kicks to Victoria followed by a neckbreaker on Jacqueline. Victoria was pushed off the turnbuckle as Stratus delivered a chick kick on Jacqueline for a broken up two count. In the end, Victoria pinned Jacqueline after Stratus delivered a Clothesline and Victoria hit Stratus with the Women's title belt, which resulted in Victoria pinning Jacqueline and retaining the title.

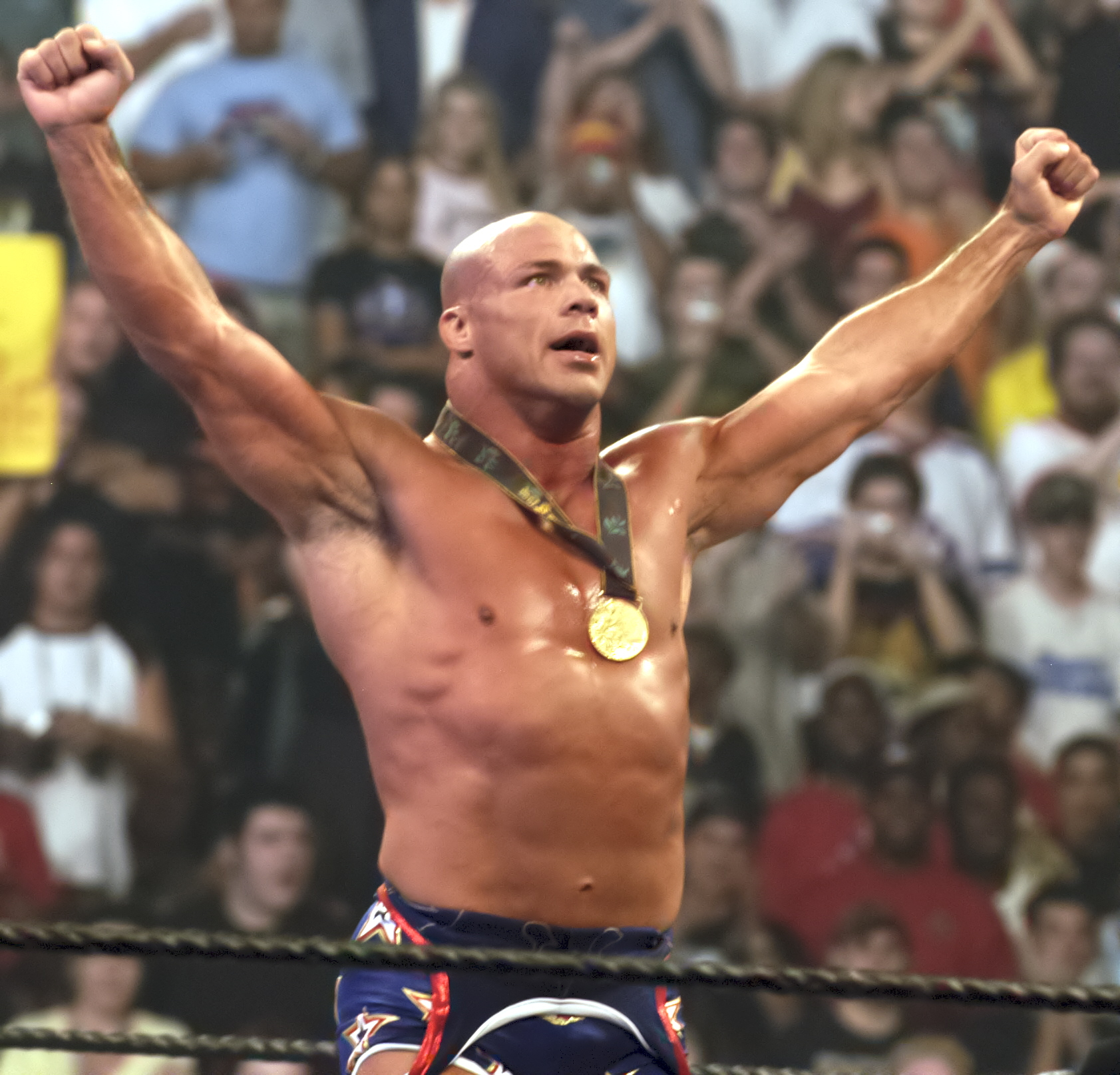
Kurt Angle, who challenged Big Show for SmackDown!'s WWE Championship.

The sixth match of the night was for the WWE Championship between Big Show (with Paul Heyman) and Kurt Angle. Angle was taken down by Big Show, but countered and got Big Show in a head-scissors lock. Angle got Big Show in a Sleeper Hold and got him down to the mat, but then Big Show reversed the hold and flipped Angle to the mat. Angle fought back and kicked Big Show in the face and then he went up to the top rope. Angle delivered a missile dropkick from the top rope, but Big Show kicked out of the pin. After back and forth action between the two (including some interference by A-Train against Angle), Angle pinned Big Show after interference from Brock Lesnar, who delivered the F-5 on Big Show, thus making Angle the winner of the match and the new WWE Champion.

=== Main Event ===
The main event saw Triple H facing champion Shawn Michaels for the World Heavyweight Championship in a Three Stages of Hell match. The first fall of the match was a Street Fight. Before the match started the referee ejected Ric Flair from ringside. Michaels and Triple H battled inside and out of the ring. Triple H tried to suplex Michaels over the ropes and through the table, but Michaels countered and suplexed Triple H right back into the ring. Michaels attempted the Sweet Chin Music, but Triple H caught Michaels and twisted Michaels' knee. Triple H focused on Michaels knee throughout the match. Triple H brought out a 2 X 4 wrapped in barbed wire, which he then lit on fire, with the flames provided on the stage. However, Michaels countered Triple H's attack and nailed him right in the face with the flaming board, which resulted in Triple H's forehead being busted open. However, Triple H picked up the first fall as he pinned Michaels after a Pedigree. The second fall was a Steel Cage match. In the match, Triple H catapulted Michaels into the wall of the cage, which was followed by Triple H grinding Michaels head into the side of the cage. After back-and-forth action between Triple H and Michaels, Michaels scored the second fall, after he Splashed Triple H through a table off the cage. The third and last fall of the night was a Ladder match. Michaels grabbed a ladder in which resulted in him dropping the ladder on Triple H's back which was quickly followed by Michaels suplexing Triple H on the ladder. The match concluded with Triple H retrieving the World Heavyweight title, after he pushed Michaels off the ladder, which resulted in Michaels crashing through four stacked tables on the outside.

== Aftermath ==
While the 2002 event featured wrestlers from both Raw and SmackDown!, the following year, Armageddon was held exclusively for the Raw brand.

== Results ==
No.	Results	Stipulations	Times
1^{H}	Jeff Hardy defeated D'Lo Brown by pinfall	Singles match	4:56
2	Booker T and Goldust defeated Chris Jericho and Christian (c), Lance Storm and William Regal and The Dudley Boyz (Bubba Ray and D-Von)	Fatal 4-Way Elimination match for the World Tag Team Championship	16:43
3	Edge defeated A-Train by disqualification	Singles match	7:12
4	Chris Benoit defeated Eddie Guerrero by submission	Singles match	16:47
5	Batista (with Ric Flair) defeated Kane by pinfall	Singles match	6:38
6	Victoria (c) defeated Trish Stratus and Jacqueline by pinfall	Triple threat match for the WWE Women's Championship	4:28
7	Kurt Angle defeated Big Show (c) (with Paul Heyman) by pinfall	Singles match for the WWE Championship	12:36
8	Triple H defeated Shawn Michaels (c) 2–1	Three Stages of Hell match for the World Heavyweight Championship: Fall 1: Street Fight (won by Triple H); Fall 2: Steel Cage match (won by Michaels); Fall 3: Ladder match (won by Triple H)	38:33
(c) / – the champion(s) heading into the match; H / – the match was broadcast prior to the pay-per-view on Sunday Night Heat

=== Tag Team elimination match ===
Elimination	Wrestler	Team	Eliminated by	Elimination move	Time
1	Bubba Ray Dudley	The Dudley Boyz	William Regal	Pinned after a roll-up	5:16
2	William Regal	Lance Storm and William Regal	Goldust	Pinned after a scoop powerslam	5:32
3	Chris Jericho	Chris Jericho and Christian (c)	Booker T	Pinned after a Book End	16:43
Winners:	Booker T and Goldust (New World Tag Team Champions)				
