= Armageddon (2004) =

World Wrestling Entertainment pay-per-view event

- Promotional poster featuring Big Show
- Promotion: World Wrestling Entertainment
- Brand: SmackDown!
- Date: December 12, 2004
- City: Duluth, Georgia
- Venue: Gwinnett Center
- Attendance: 5,000
- Buy rate: 230,000

Pay-per-view chronology
| ← Previous; Survivor Series | Next → New Year's Revolution |

Armageddon chronology
| ← Previous; 2003 | Next → 2005 |

The 2004 Armageddon was a professional wrestling pay-per-view (PPV) event produced by World Wrestling Entertainment (WWE). It was the fifth Armageddon and took place on December 12, 2004, at the Gwinnett Center in Duluth, Georgia, held exclusively for wrestlers from the promotion's SmackDown! brand division. Nine professional wrestling matches were scheduled on the event's card.

All four championships exclusive to the SmackDown! brand were contested for; one was lost while the other three were retained. The main event was a fatal four-way match for the WWE Championship involving reigning champion John "Bradshaw" Layfield (JBL), Eddie Guerrero, Booker T, and The Undertaker, which JBL won after pinning Booker T. One of the predominant matches on the undercard was Big Show versus Kurt Angle, Mark Jindrak, and Luther Reigns in a Handicap match. Big Show won the match after pinning Jindrak following an F-5. Another primary match on the card was John Cena versus Jesús in a Street Fight for the WWE United States Championship, which Cena won to retain by pinfall after executing an FU.

== Production ==
=== Background ===
Armageddon was a professional wrestling pay-per-view (PPV) event established by World Wrestling Entertainment (WWE) in 1999 and held every December except in 2001. The fifth event was held on December 12, 2004, at the Gwinnett Center in the Atlanta suburb of Duluth, Georgia. While the previous year featured wrestlers exclusively from the Raw brand, the 2004 event was held exclusively for SmackDown!.

=== Storylines ===
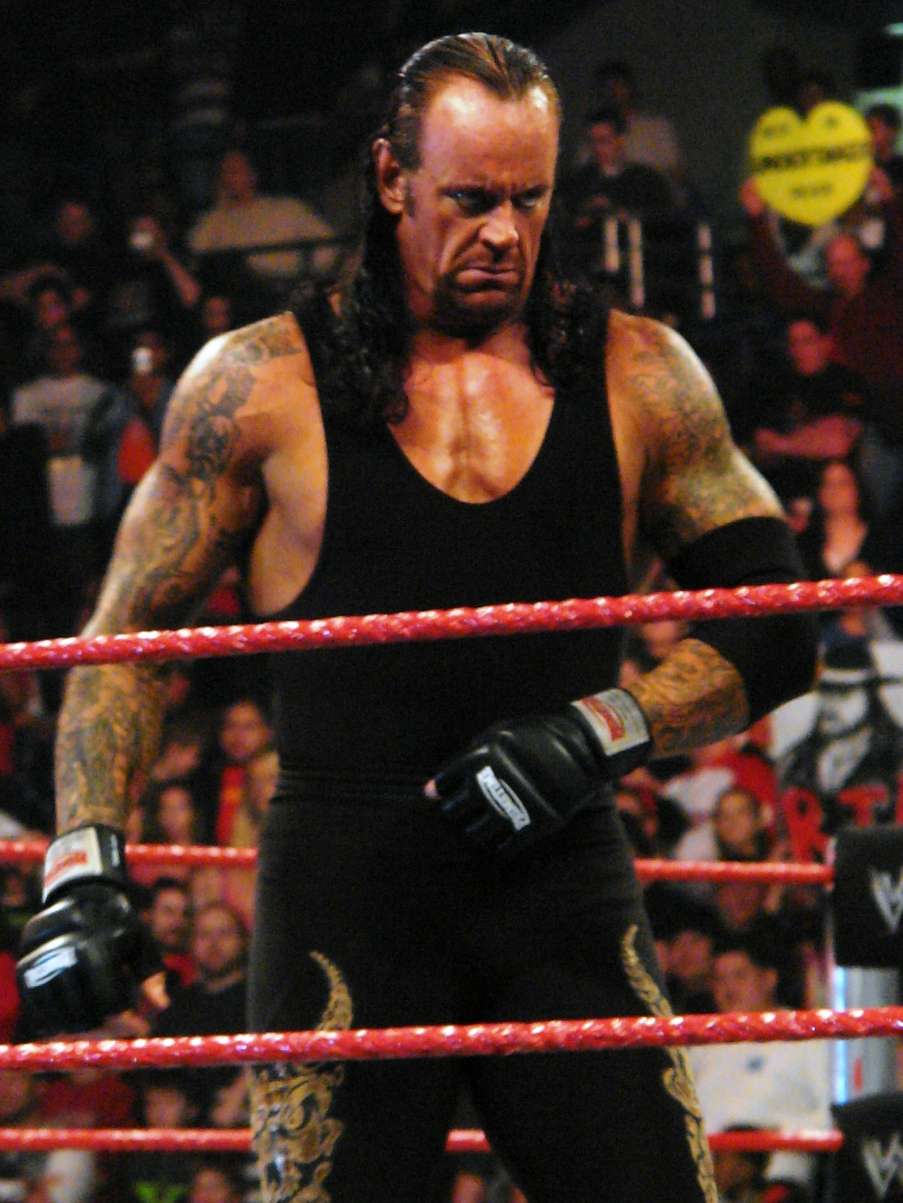
The Undertaker, who took part in the fatal four-way match for the WWE Championship.

The main feud heading into Armageddon was between John "Bradshaw" Layfield (JBL), Booker T, Eddie Guerrero, and The Undertaker over the WWE Championship. At Survivor Series, JBL faced Booker T for the WWE Championship. Before the match began, JBL announced that if he lost the match he would leave professional wrestling forever. JBL won the match and retained the title after hitting Booker T with the WWE Championship belt. On the November 18 episode of SmackDown!, JBL, Guerrero, Booker T and The Undertaker were all arguing over who should be the next number one contender for the WWE Championship. SmackDown! general manager Theodore Long then announced that JBL would be defending the WWE Championship against Guerrero, Booker T and The Undertaker at Armageddon. On the November 25 episode of SmackDown!, JBL and Orlando Jordan faced Booker T and Guerrero in a tag team match. JBL and Jordan won the match following interference from the Basham Brothers. When the match was over, The Undertaker came out and attacked JBL's cabinet followed by executing a Tombstone Piledriver to JBL. On the December 9 episode of SmackDown!, Long booked JBL, Jordan, and The Basham Brothers to face, Guerrero, Booker T and The Undertaker in a 7-man handicap tag team match in the main event. The Undertaker, Booker T and Guerrero won the match. SmackDown! General Manager Theodore Long announced that The Cabinet would not be allowed at ringside and if they interfered in the match then JBL would be stripped of the WWE Championship.

A secondary feud heading into Armageddon was between John Cena and Jesús over the WWE United States Championship. The feud started on the October 7 episode of SmackDown!, when Cena was interrupted by the debuting Carlito. Carlito stated that he wanted a United States title shot, which Cena agreed to. Later that night, Cena lost the United States Championship to Carlito after being hit in the head with his signature chain. On the October 14 episode of SmackDown!, SmackDown! General Manager Therdore Long announced that Cena had been involved in an after hours bar fight. Long said that Cena had been (kayfabe) stabbed in the kidney by Carlito's bodyguard, Jesús. The feud restarted at Survivor Series, when Cena returned from his injury. On the November 18 episode of SmackDown!, Cena stated that he wanted revenge on Carlito and his United States Championship back. Cena defeated Carlito (who had suffered a legitimate shoulder injury) to regain the title, but after the match Jesús attacked Cena in the injured kidney, which forced Cena to be taken out on a stretcher.

== Event ==
Other on-screen personnel
| Role: | Name: |
|---|---|
| English commentators | Michael Cole |
| English commentators | Tazz |
| Spanish commentators | Carlos Cabrera |
| Spanish commentators | Hugo Savinovich |
| Ring announcer | Tony Chimel |
| Referees | Nick Patrick |
| Referees | Charles Robinson |
| Referees | Jim Korderas |
| Referees | Brian Hebner |

Before the event went live on pay-per-view, Akio and Billy Kidman defeated Paul London and Chavo Guerrero Jr., which was taped for Sunday Night Heat.

=== Preliminary matches ===
The first match was for the WWE Tag Team Championship between the team of Rob Van Dam and Rey Mysterio Jr. and the team of René Duprée and Kenzo Suzuki, who were accompanied by Hiroko. The match started off with both teams getting the advantage. During the match, Torrie Wilson came down and attacked Hiroko. Mysterio executed a 619 on Dupree and Suzuki and Van Dam performed a Five-Star Frog Splash to Dupree to retain the title.

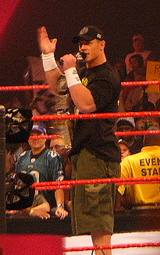
John Cena defended the United States Championship against Jesús in a Street Fight

In the second match Kurt Angle faced Santa Claus. Angle forced Santa to submit to the Ankle lock to win the match.

In the third match Daniel Puder faced Mike Mizanin in a Dixie Dog Fight The match went through every 3-minute round. Puder won the match by judge's decision.

The Basham Brothers (Doug Basham and Danny Basham) versus Hardcore Holly and Charlie Haas was next. After Holly was distracted by Dawn Marie and Miss Jackie brawling, Danny pinned Holly with an Inside Cradle to win the match for his team.

In the next match John Cena faced Jesús in a Street Fight for the United States Championship. The match started with Cena gaining the advantage. Both men hit each other with a cane. Cena hit Jesus with a kendo stick, piece of metal and a trashcan lid. Cena hit Jesús in the head repeatedly with his steel chain, causing Jesús to bleed. Cena executed an FU on Jesús to retain the title. After the match, Cena hit Carlito with his chain.

The sixth match of the event was Dawn Marie versus Miss Jackie with Charlie Haas as the special guest referee. Marie won the match with a roll-up while holding Jackie's tights.

=== Main event matches ===
In the seventh match, Big Show faced Kurt Angle, Mark Jindrak and Luther Reigns in a Handicap match. Big Show dominated the match. Angle executed an Angle slam on Big Show and applied the Ankle lock, but Big Show countered. Big Show executed an F-500 on Jindrak to win the match.

In the next match, Spike Dudley faced Funaki for the WWE Cruiserweight Championship. Spike countered a Tornado DDT and attempted the Dudley Dog but Funaki Bridge pinned Dudley to win the title.

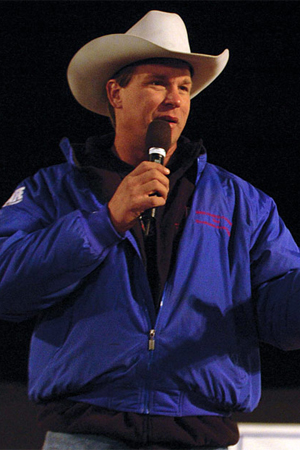
John "Bradshaw" Layfield (JBL), who defended the WWE Championship in a fatal four-way match.

In the main event, John "Bradshaw" Layfield (JBL) faced Eddie Guerrero, Booker T and The Undertaker in a fatal four-way match for the WWE Championship. The stipulation was if The Cabinet interfered in the match then JBL would be stripped of the title. As the match began, JBL retreated as the other three fought each other. The Undertaker performed a side slam on JBL and threw Booker T over the barricade. JBL tried to Powerbomb The Undertaker through a broadcast table but The Undertaker countered with a back body drop. The Undertaker executed Old School on Booker T and a guillotine leg drop on Guerrero. JBL performed a JBL Bomb onto a broadcast table and an Elbow Drop through the table on Booker T. The Undertaker executed a Last Ride through a broadcast table on JBL. Guerrero executed two frog splashes on The Undertaker but The Undertaker sat up. Guerrero hit The Undertaker with the ladder and executed a frog splash off the ladder but JBL pulled the referee out of the ring. The Undertaker chokeslammed the other three and attempted a Tombstone Piledriver but Heidenreich attacked The Undertaker. JBL tried to pin Booker T and Guerrero, who both kicked out. Heidenreich pulled The Undertaker from the ring and applied a cobra clutch on The Undertaker. JBL executed a Clothesline from Hell on Booker T to retain the title.

== Aftermath ==
After the pay-per-view, the feud between John "Bradshaw" Layfield (JBL), The Undertaker, Eddie Guerrero, and Booker T ended. JBL went to feud with Big Show and Kurt Angle over the WWE Championship, which would end at No Way Out. The Undertaker went to feud with Heidenreich, which led to a Casket match at the Royal Rumble, which The Undertaker won despite the interference by Gene Snitsky and The Undertaker's brother Kane and ended their feud. John Cena and Carlito's feud ended after the event, as Cena went on to win a tournament at No Way Out to challenge JBL for the WWE Championship at WrestleMania. Cena went on to win the WWE Championship from JBL at WrestleMania, and held the title until January 2006, even after being drafted to the Raw brand.

== Results ==
| No. | Results | Stipulations | Times |
|---|---|---|---|
| 1^{H} | Akio and Billy Kidman defeated Chavo Guerrero and Paul London by pinfall | Tag team match | 5:44 |
| 2 | Rob Van Dam and Rey Mysterio (c) (with Torrie Wilson) defeated René Duprée and Kenzo Suzuki (with Hiroko) by pinfall | Tag team match for the WWE Tag Team Championship | 17:12 |
| 3 | Kurt Angle defeated Santa Claus by submission | Singles match | 0:25 |
| 4 | Daniel Puder defeated Mike Mizanin | Dixie Dog Fight | 3:00 |
| 5 | The Basham Brothers (Doug and Danny) defeated Hardcore Holly and Charlie Haas by pinfall | Tag team match | 6:50 |
| 6 | John Cena (c) defeated Jesús (with Carlito Caribbean Cool) by pinfall | Street Fight for the WWE United States Championship | 7:54 |
| 7 | Dawn Marie defeated Miss Jackie by pinfall | Singles match with Charlie Haas as special guest referee | 1:44 |
| 8 | Big Show defeated Kurt Angle, Mark Jindrak and Luther Reigns by pinfall | Handicap match | 9:57 |
| 9 | Funaki defeated Spike Dudley (c) by pinfall | Singles match for the WWE Cruiserweight Championship | 9:30 |
| 10 | John "Bradshaw" Layfield (c) defeated Eddie Guerrero, Booker T and The Undertaker by pinfall | Fatal 4-Way match for the WWE Championship (Note: Had The Cabinet interfered in the match, JBL would have been stripped of the title.) | 25:37 |
(c) / – the champion(s) heading into the match; H / – the match was broadcast prior to the pay-per-view on Sunday Night Heat
