= Armageddon (2000) =

World Wrestling Federation pay-per-view event

- Promotional poster featuring The Undertaker
- Promotion: World Wrestling Federation
- Date: December 10, 2000
- City: Birmingham, Alabama
- Venue: Birmingham–Jefferson Civic Center
- Attendance: 14,920
- Buy rate: 465,000
- Tagline: Lord, I'm Coming Home to You.

Pay-per-view chronology
← Previous; Rebellion	Next → Royal Rumble

Armageddon chronology
← Previous; 1999	Next → 2002

The 2000 Armageddon was a professional wrestling pay-per-view (PPV) event produced by the World Wrestling Federation. It was the second annual Armageddon and took place on December 10, 2000, at the Birmingham–Jefferson Civic Center in Birmingham, Alabama.

== Production ==
=== Background ===
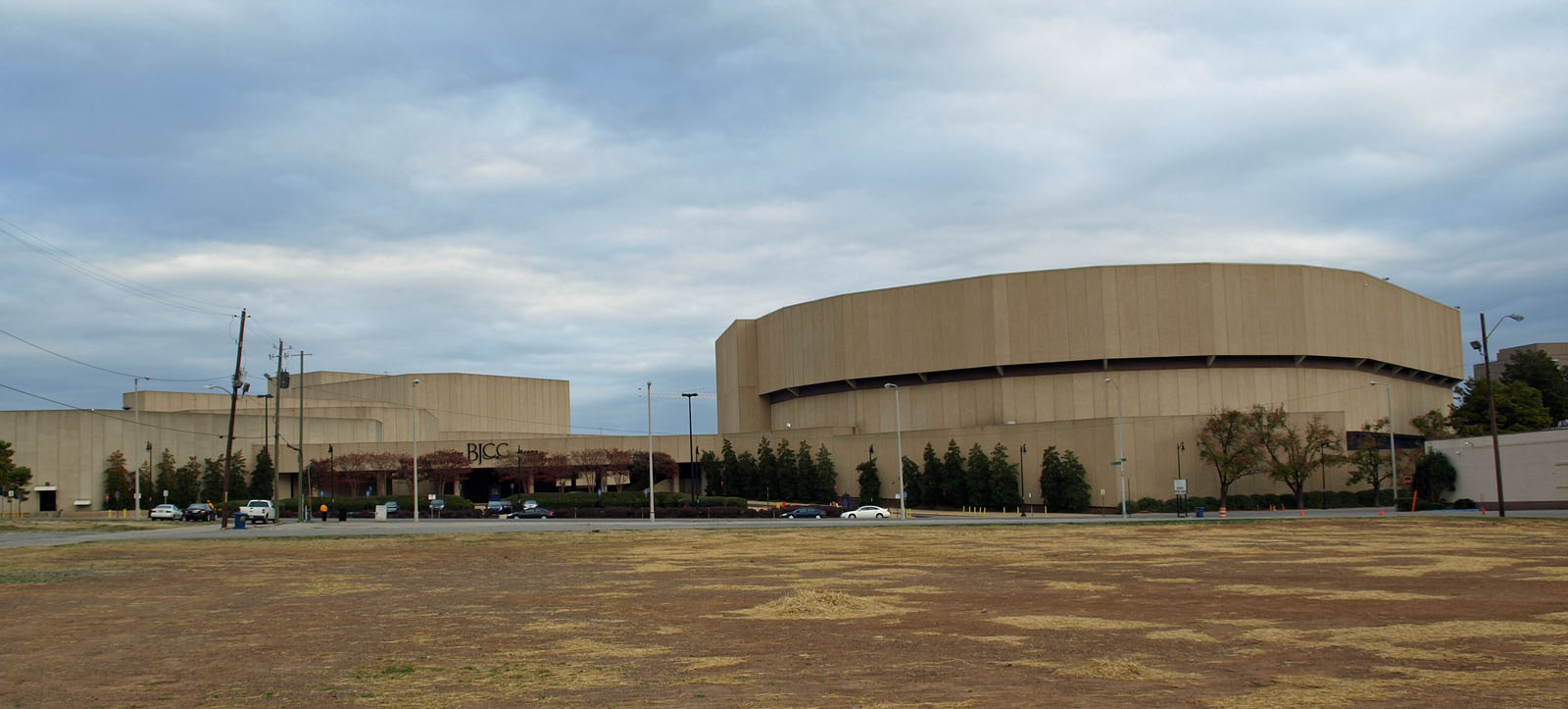
The event was held at the Birmingham–Jefferson Civic Center in Birmingham, Alabama.

In December 1999, the World Wrestling Federation established Armageddon as their annual December professional wrestling pay-per-view (PPV) event, after the promotion had ended their In Your House-branded shows earlier that year in February. The second Armageddon event was held on December 10, 2000, at the Birmingham–Jefferson Civic Center in Birmingham, Alabama.

=== Storylines ===
The central feud heading into Armageddon was between WWF Champion Kurt Angle, The Undertaker, Triple H, "Stone Cold" Steve Austin, The Rock, and Rikishi inside Hell in a Cell for the WWF Championship. At No Mercy, Angle won the championship from The Rock in a No Disqualification Match. Angle would later retain the title against The Undertaker at Survivor Series and again at Rebellion in a Fatal Four Way Match against The Rock, Rikishi, and Austin. Commissioner Mick Foley would later announce on SmackDown! that Angle would defend his title against The Undertaker, Triple H, Austin, The Rock and Rikishi inside a six-man Hell in a Cell match. Mr. McMahon would try desperately to get all six men to back out, but ultimately failed to do so.

Another feud heading into Armageddon was between Chris Jericho and Kane in a Last Man Standing match. It started at Survivor Series when Kane defeated Jericho by pinfall. They would later fight again at Rebellion only for Kane to defeat Jericho. It was later announced on Raw is War that their feud would come to an end at Armageddon in a Last Man Standing match.

== Event ==
Other on-screen personnel
Role:	Name:
English commentators	Jim Ross
English commentators	Jerry Lawler
Spanish commentators	Carlos Cabrera
Spanish commentators	Hugo Savinovich
Interviewers	Kevin Kelly
Interviewers	Lilian Garcia
Interviewers	Michael Cole
Ring announcer	Howard Finkel
Referees	Mike Chioda
Referees	Jim Korderas
Referees	Earl Hebner
Referees	Jack Doan
Referees	Tim White
Referees	Theodore Long

Before the actual pay-per-view started, Scotty 2 Hotty pinned D'Lo Brown on Sunday Night Heat.

=== Preliminary matches ===
The pay-per-view opened with a six-person intergender tag team elimination match between the Radicalz (Dean Malenko, Perry Saturn, and Eddie Guerrero) (with Terri) and Team Xtreme (Matt Hardy, Jeff Hardy and Lita). The early stages of the match were dominated by Team Xtreme as Jeff Hardy blocked Guerrero's hurricanrana and then performed his High-Angle Senton, the "Swanton Bomb", on Guerrero for the three-count, eliminating Guerrero. Jeff then executed his flying Top-Rope Kick, which he calls "Poetry in Motion", on Malenko. However, the momentum began to shift towards the Radicalz when Malenko immediately tagged in Saturn, who promptly eliminated Jeff with a Death Valley driver. Matt then came into the match and blindsided Saturn with a bulldog for a near fall. Matt then attempted a Swinging Neckbreaker, which he calls "Twist of Fate", on Saturn but it was countered into a suplex. Matt tried again and this time nailed it to eliminate Saturn by pinfall. Afterwards, Radicalz manager Terri slapped Matt and Lita speared Terri for her efforts. Malenko took advantage and rolled Matt up from behind for the pin. He wouldn't have long to celebrate though, as Lita performed a headscissors kick on Malenko. She then executed her moonsault, which she calls "Litasault", on Malenko only to have him kick out at two. After taking a subsequent DDT, Malenko superplexed Lita and stopped his own pinfall. He pulled her up from a pin again after a backbreaker, and instead forced Lita to tap to his finisher, the "Texas Cloverleaf". After the match, Michael Cole tried to interview Lita. She responded by saying that she can beat Malenko.

The next match pitted Hardcore Holly against European Champion William Regal. After cutting Regal's mic work short with his entrance theme, Holly quickly went to work on Regal. After back and forth punches outside the ring, Regal finally got the momentum on his side when he sent Holly into the back of a ring post. When the two came into the ring, Holly replied with a belly-to-back suplex for a near fall. Regal did a superplex on Holly for a two-count as well. Holly took control from that point until late in the bout when Raven interfered and DDTed Holly, thus allowing Regal to take the easy pinfall victory.

The third match saw Chyna take on Val Venis, who was accompanied to the ring by fellow Right To Censor stable member and WWF Women's Champion, Ivory. The early portions of the match were dominated by Chyna until Venis whip tossed her out of the ring and Ivory started attacking her at ringside. The momentum swung back and forth until Ivory became more and more aggressive in interfering on Venis' behalf. She really got into Chyna's head when she tripped her, causing Chyna to chase her until Venis intercepted Chyna and delivered a Fisherman's suplex for the pinfall. Chyna was about to beat up Ivory after the match, but Venis once again saved her from Chyna's wrath, powerbombing her.

This was followed by a Last Man Standing match between Kane and Chris Jericho. The match started as Kane attacked Jericho on the aisle and quickly returned him to the backstage area. Mideon was attacked by both men as he was in the way. Kane and Jericho finally made their way to the ring shortly afterwards. The match was a roller-coaster affair, as neither competitor could gain a huge momentum advantage over the other. After connecting with his signature flying clothesline on Jericho, Kane delivered his chokeslam on Jericho. Jericho recovered and low blowed Kane, who was about to hit him with a chair. Jericho had the momentum on his side once more and took advantage with his Top-Rope Moonsault, which Jericho calls "Lionsault", on Kane, who was lying face-down on the chair. Kane took temporary control with a big boot until he dragged Jericho into the tech area. Jericho then knocked a ton of stacked barrels on Kane to keep him down for the 10-second count and the victory.

Next, WWF Tag Team Champions Bull Buchanan and The Goodfather of the Right To Censor were challenged by Edge and Christian, the Dudley Boyz (Bubba Ray Dudley and D-Von Dudley) and Road Dogg and K-Kwik. The Right To Censor started off the match attacking the Dudleys. D-Von responded with a back elbow on Buchanan. After a period of double teaming, Steven Richards, the leader of The Right To Censor, attempted to interfere on his team's behalf and DDTed D-Von just when it looked like the Dudleys had the match won. It didn't go as planned for Richards though, as Edge speared Bubba Ray and Christian nailed the tomakazie on Bubba for the pin and win the tag titles.

The Intercontinental Championship was on the line as Billy Gunn defended his title against Chris Benoit. Benoit got the initial momentum with a series of stomps on Gunn until he was thrown out of the ring. Benoit locked in the figure four leg lock when the action returned to the ring, but Gunn managed to struggle his way to the ropes. Forcing Benoit to release the hold. Gunn started to gain some momentum with a jackhammer followed by his "Fame-Asser" which only netted him a near fall. Benoit then caught Gunn in his "Crippler Crossface", but Gunn got his foot on the rope, again forcing Benoit to release the hold. Gunn was showing signs of injury when his knee buckled during a tilt-a-whirl on Benoit. Benoit took advantage by once again applying the "Crippler Crossface" on Gunn, forcing a submission and therefore becoming the new Intercontinental Champion.

Next, a triple threat match for Ivory's WWF Women's Championship took place. The other competitors were Trish Stratus and Molly Holly. Molly started it off with an attack on Stratus before being monkey flipped. Molly was then double suplexed by Stratus and Ivory. Molly hit a crossbody for a near fall on Stratus after wasting some time to drag Ivory out of position to break up the pin count. T & A (Test and Albert) interfered in the match as Ivory picked up the win. After the match Molly's cousin, Crash came out and challenged T & A with the Acolytes (Bradshaw and Faarooq). The Acolytes, Crash, and Molly Holly successfully beat up T & A.

=== Main event match ===
The main event match was a six-man Hell in a Cell match for Kurt Angle's WWF Championship. The challengers were The Undertaker, The Rock, Triple H, Rikishi, and "Stone Cold" Steve Austin. Angle was the third man to come out, but didn't get in the cell yet. Austin was the last man to come out and attacked Angle who was still outside the cell and threw him in. The early portion of the match saw several pinfall attempts by all participants; during this time, Vince McMahon, Pat Patterson, and Gerald Brisco were working together to stop the match by attempting to demolish the cell with a truck. They had just torn down the cell door when WWF Commissioner Mick Foley ordered the trio to allow the match to run its course. The trio ignored Foley, and the Commissioner sent the police to escort McMahon out of the arena as he fought Patterson and Brisco. As a result of the missing door, everyone involved in the match exited the cell and started climbing to the top of the structure. As Rikishi was fighting off both Angle and The Undertaker, The Undertaker chokeslammed Rikishi off the cell and into the pine chip filled bed of the truck used by McMahon. Austin and The Rock had a stare down inside the cell and traded blows. The Rock delivered the spinebuster on Austin, but was clotheslined by Triple H before he could execute his signature "People's Elbow" on Austin. The Rock punched Triple H out of the ring and nailed the "Rock Bottom" on Angle. "Stone Cold" recovered to stop the count and hit a stunner on The Rock, but Triple H broke up the pin and received a neckbreaker from Austin. Angle snuck on top of The Rock and pinned him to retain his WWF Championship, only to receive a Stunner from Austin.

== Reception ==
In 2017, Kevin Pantoja of 411Mania gave the event a rating of 3.5 [Bad], writing, "So much of this PPV felt like filler. It was the definition of a one match show. They continually hyped the main event throughout the night and it was the sole focus. Everything else felt like it was there to fill the other two hours. The two tag matches were decent, but something you could get on TV. The only other match with a shot at standing out was Jericho/Kane, but they put on a stinker of a performance. Check out the main event and skip the rest of the show".

== Aftermath ==
After Kurt Angle retained the WWF Championship against "Stone Cold" Steve Austin on the January 8, 2001, episode of Raw is War, Vince McMahon announced that Angle would defend his title against his son-in-law Triple H at the Royal Rumble. Triple H claimed that Angle could only have become the champion because Triple H allowed him to, with which Angle disagreed. At the Royal Rumble, Angle defeated Triple H in a singles match for the WWF Championship following interference from Austin.

WWF Commissioner Mick Foley considered resigning due to a promise that he made on SmackDown! leading into the PPV, where if anyone suffered a serious injury in the 6-man Hell in a Cell match, he would resign as Commissioner. Instead, Foley chose to keep his job due to support from "Stone Cold" Steve Austin and the WWF fans. However, on the December 18 episode of Raw Is War, when the board of directors deemed Linda McMahon incompetent to continue being CEO due to a nervous breakdown from Vince publicly requesting a divorce (kayfabe), granted Vince McMahon 100% control of the WWF, allowing him to fire Foley as Commissioner.

The Undertaker also began to feud with Triple H, albeit immediately after HHH's feud with Angle began to wane. On an episode of SmackDown!, The Undertaker had a restraining order placed against him after attacking Triple H's on-screen wife, Stephanie McMahon-Helmsley, but The Undertaker would exploit a loophole in his restraining order by assigning his kayfabe half-brother, Kane, to stalk Stephanie. When new WWF Commissioner William Regal refused to grant him a match against Triple H at WrestleMania X-Seven, an event The Undertaker had never lost at, he threatened to have Kane throw Stephanie over the balcony above them. Commissioner Regal finally gave The Undertaker his match. The Undertaker would go on to up his WrestleMania record to 9–0 with his victory over Triple H.

"Stone Cold" Steve Austin would go on to enter the Royal Rumble Match at the Royal Rumble despite being attacked and busted open by Triple H before Austin officially participated in it by entering the ring for costing him a chance to become the WWF Champion earlier that night in revenge for Triple H robbing Austin of a reign with the same title on a past episode of Raw is War. On the way he fought long-time rival The Rock, who claimed to have won the Royal Rumble for the second time in a row. At the Royal Rumble, "Stone Cold" Steve Austin won the match after eliminating Kane. He would go to WrestleMania X-Seven to defeat The Rock in a No Disqualification match to win the WWF Championship with some highly unlikely help from former arch-rival Mr. McMahon, thus beginning his heel turn.

The 2000 Armageddon would be the final Armageddon held until 2002, as the originally planned 2001 event was replaced by Vengeance due to the September 11 attacks; the promotion felt that the "Armageddon" name would be offensive to the victims of the attacks. As such, the 2000 event was the final Armageddon held under the WWF name, as in May 2002, the promotion was renamed to World Wrestling Entertainment (WWE). It would also be the final Armageddon held before the introduction of the brand extension in March 2002, where the promotion divided its roster between the Raw and SmackDown! brands where wrestlers were exclusively assigned to perform.

== Results ==
No.	Results	Stipulations	Times
1^{H}	Scotty 2 Hotty (with Grand Master Sexay) defeated D'Lo Brown (with Chaz and Tiger Ali Singh) by pinfall	Singles match	—
2	The Radicalz (Dean Malenko, Eddie Guerrero, and Perry Saturn) (with Terri) defeated Team Xtreme (Jeff Hardy, Matt Hardy, and Lita)	Intergender elimination tag team match	8:06
3	William Regal (c) defeated Hardcore Holly by pinfall	Singles match for the WWF European Championship	5:00
4	Val Venis (with Ivory) defeated Chyna by pinfall	Singles match	4:59
5	Chris Jericho defeated Kane	Last Man Standing match	17:16
6	Edge and Christian defeated The Dudley Boyz (Bubba Ray Dudley and D-Von Dudley), K-Kwik and Road Dogg, and Right to Censor (Bull Buchanan and The Goodfather) (c) (with Steven Richards) by pinfall	Fatal four-way match for the WWF Tag Team Championship	9:42
7	Chris Benoit defeated Billy Gunn (c) by submission	Singles match for the WWF Intercontinental Championship	10:03
8	Ivory (c) defeated Molly Holly and Trish Stratus by pinfall	Triple threat match for the WWF Women's Championship	2:12
9	Kurt Angle (c) defeated The Rock, Rikishi, "Stone Cold" Steve Austin, Triple H, and The Undertaker by pinfall	6-Man Hell in a Cell match for the WWF Championship	32:12
(c) / – the champion(s) heading into the match; H / – the match was broadcast prior to the pay-per-view on Sunday Night Heat

=== Intergender elimination match ===
Eliminated	Wrestler	Eliminated by	Method
1	Eddie Guerrero	Jeff Hardy	Pinfall
2	Jeff Hardy	Perry Saturn	Pinfall
3	Perry Saturn	Matt Hardy	Pinfall
4	Matt Hardy	Dean Malenko	Pinfall
5	Lita	Dean Malenko	Submission
Winners:	The Radicalz (Dean Malenko, Eddie Guerrero, and Perry Saturn)		
