= WWE Armageddon =

World Wrestling Entertainment pay-per-view event series

- WWE Armageddon logo
- Promotions: World Wrestling Entertainment
- Brands: Raw (2002–2003, 2007–2008); SmackDown (2002, 2004–2008); ECW (2007–2008)
- First event: 1999
- Last event: 2008

WWE Armageddon was a professional wrestling pay-per-view (PPV) event produced by World Wrestling Entertainment (WWE), a professional wrestling promotion based in Connecticut. The event was created in 1999, when the promotion was still called the World Wrestling Federation (WWF, renamed to WWE in 2002). It was held every December except in 2001, as that year, Vengeance replaced Armageddon as the event's name was thought to be insensitive following the September 11 attacks, although Armageddon was reinstated in 2002 with Vengeance moving up to July.

To coincide with the brand extension introduced in 2002, the event was made exclusive to the Raw brand in 2003 before becoming SmackDown-exclusive from 2004 to 2006. Following WrestleMania 23 in 2007, brand-exclusive PPVs were discontinued. The final event was held in 2008, with TLC: Tables, Ladders & Chairs replacing Armageddon in 2009.

== History ==
From May 1995 to February 1999, the World Wrestling Federation (WWF, now WWE) held a series of monthly pay-per-views (PPV) titled In Your House. The WWF discontinued the In Your House series to establish permanent names for the monthly PPVs that would be held annually. Armageddon was established that year to be held as the annual December PPV. The inaugural Armageddon was held on December 12, 1999, at the National Car Rental Center in Sunrise, Florida and it aired live on PPV. The first two Armageddon events were held when the promotion was still called the WWF. In 2001, Armageddon was replaced by Vengeance due to the September 11 attacks; the promotion felt that the name "Armageddon" would offend victims of the attacks. Armageddon, however, was reinstated in 2002 with Vengeance moving up to July.

In 2002, the WWF changed its name to World Wrestling Entertainment (WWE) due to a court order following a lawsuit from the World Wildlife Fund over the "WWF" initialism. The promotion also held their very first draft that year to split its roster into two distinctive brands of wrestling, Raw and SmackDown!, where wrestlers would exclusively perform—ECW was added as a third brand in 2006. The 2002 event featured wrestlers from both Raw and SmackDown!, but the 2003 event was held exclusively for the Raw brand. It was then held exclusively for the SmackDown! brand from 2004 to 2006. Following WrestleMania 23 in 2007, WWE discontinued brand-exclusive PPVs. The 2007 event was the last pay-per-view to be broadcast by WWE in 480p standard definition format. In January 2008, all WWE programming switched to 720p high definition. The 2008 event was the final event as Armageddon was discontinued and replaced by TLC: Tables, Ladders & Chairs in 2009.

== Locations ==
Locations for Armageddon venues in the United States.

== Events ==
Raw-branded event	SmackDown-branded event

#	Event	Date	City	Venue	Main event	Ref.
1	Armageddon (1999)	December, 12, 1999	Sunrise, Florida	National Car Rental Center	Triple H vs. Mr. McMahon in a No Holds Barred match	
2	Armageddon (2000)	December 10, 2000	Birmingham, Alabama	Birmingham–Jefferson Civic Center	Kurt Angle (c) vs. Stone Cold Steve Austin vs. Triple H vs. The Undertaker vs. The Rock vs. Rikishi in a Hell in a Cell match for the WWF Championship	
3	Armageddon (2002)	December 15, 2002	Sunrise, Florida	Office Depot Center	Shawn Michaels (c) vs. Triple H in a Three Stages of Hell match for the World Heavyweight Championship	
4	Armageddon (2003)	December 14, 2003	Orlando, Florida	TD Waterhouse Centre	Goldberg (c) vs. Triple H vs. Kane in a triple threat match for the World Heavyweight Championship	
5	Armageddon (2004)	December 12, 2004	Duluth, Georgia	Gwinnett Center	John "Bradshaw" Layfield (c) vs. Eddie Guerrero vs. The Undertaker vs. Booker T in a fatal four-way match for the WWE Championship	
6	Armageddon (2005)	December 18, 2005	Providence, Rhode Island	Dunkin' Donuts Center	The Undertaker vs. Randy Orton in a Hell in a Cell match	
7	Armageddon (2006)	December 17, 2006	Richmond, Virginia	Richmond Coliseum	Batista and John Cena vs. King Booker's Court (Finlay and King Booker)	
8	Armageddon (2007)	December 16, 2007	Pittsburgh, Pennsylvania	Mellon Arena	Batista (c) vs. Edge vs. The Undertaker in a triple threat match for the World Heavyweight Championship	
9	Armageddon (2008)	December 14, 2008	Buffalo, New York	HSBC Arena	Edge (c) vs. Triple H vs. Jeff Hardy in a triple threat match for the WWE Championship	
(c) – refers to the champion(s) heading into the match

== See also ==
- List of WWE pay-per-view events
