= Hugo Savinovich =

Ecuadorian professional wrestler, commentator and manager (born 1959)

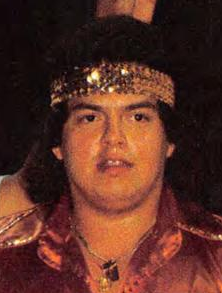
- Savinovich in 1984
- Born: February 15, 1959 (age 67); Guayaquil, Ecuador
- Spouse(s): Wendi Richter (div.); Diana Mendéz de Savinovich (1990–2019)
- Children: 2
- Professional wrestling career
- Ring name(s): El Muñecazo; El Hombre Simio; Babyface Savinovich; Hugo Savinovich; La Pantera Asesina; La Ferretería Ambulante; El Hijo de Doña Mélida; El Deforme
- Billed height: 178 cm (5 ft 10 in)
- Billed weight: 105 kg (231 lb)
- Trained by: Angel "El Toro" Maldonado
- Debut: 1978
- Retired: July 22, 2023

Hugo Savinovich (born February 15, 1959) is an Ecuadorian sports commentator and retired professional wrestler and professional wrestling manager. He is best known as part of the Spanish language commentary team for the professional wrestling promotion WWE from 1994 to 2011. He was signed to Lucha Libre AAA as a Spanish commentator.

== Early life ==
Savinovich moved from Ecuador with his family of Croatian descent to the Bronx, New York in the 1960s. Before becoming a commentator, he wrestled for many years, performing throughout Latin America in Puerto Rico, Panama, and the Dominican Republic. He claims that becoming a professional wrestler literally saved his life, as he was originally a gang member in the streets of New York City in the late 1960s and early 1970s. He joined the sport under the guidance of Angel "El Toro" Maldonado.

== Professional wrestling career ==
Savinovich began his wrestling career in working for promoter Angel "El Toro" Maldonado in New York as the masked La Pantera Asesina. He later worked for Mexican wrestling promoter Arturo Mendoza, who took him to Puerto Rico to work in his wrestling company based in the west part of the island. Savinovich then moved on to the World Wrestling Council in 1978 was, where he was originally a "tecnico" (the Spanish wrestling term for a "face", or "good guy"); after breaking up with Mendoza and his original wrestling partner, Little Chief Cherokee, he joined the local World Wrestling Council franchise in Puerto Rico, Capitol Sport Promotions (owned partially by Carlos Colón), where he gained notoriety for being one of the "rudo" wrestlers (i.e., "heels", or wrestling villains), with a penchant for flamboyancy and self-promotion that gained him his most famous ring name, "El Muñecazo" ("The Big Baby Doll"). Savinovich is on record as stating that he modeled his role after Gorgeous George, although his looks were particular to him (long hair with a mullet and David Letterman-like gaped teeth).

Savinovich went on many occasions to Dominicana de Espectaculos in the Dominican Republic.

He would tour the United States for Western States Sports and Mid-South Wrestling in 1980 and Japan for All Japan Pro Wrestling in 1984.

Hugo managed some the most notorious heels in professional wrestling such as Abdullah the Butcher, Ox Baker, The Sheik and Buddy Landell until he had a fallout with Barrabas Sr. becoming a face in 1984.

Savinovich eventually became a partner at World Wrestling Council, only to split with Colón a few years after a rather acrimonious business dispute with the company management forced him to leave and joined the rival American Wrestling Federation.

In 1991, Savinovich would come back to in-ring competition after seven years and feud with Billy Joe Travis, which would last a couple years in WWC and AWF.

During his wrestling run, he wrestled names like Bret Hart, Eric Embry and his biggest rival, El Profe.

He had a high profile match when he teamed with Kane to defeat Chicky Starr and Victor The Bodyguard on April 7, 2001 for IWA Puerto Rico.

Savinovich had his retirement match at WWC Summer Madness on July 22, 2023 in Bayamón, Puerto Rico, where he lost the match to El Profe.

== Announcer and commentator ==
Savinovich began announcing in 1984 for WWC when he replaced Rickin Sánchez. He did play-by-play in English for the WWC. He quit the WWC in 1991 to join the rival American Wrestling Federation. Savinovich worked briefly in 1994 for a series of TV tapings for the International Wrestling Association. He worked at World Wrestling Entertainment in 1994 until 2011, when his contract was not renewed. Savinovich then worked for Lucha Underground from 2014 to 2018. He joined Lucha Libre AAA Worldwide in 2017 until being released in August 2024.

Savinovich serves as commentator for Global Wrestling Evolution (GWE) in the Republic of Panama.

== Controversies ==
Savinovich reported in November 2019 that WWE wrestlers were kidnapped in Saudi Arabia. WWE lawyer Jerry McDevitt denied Savinovich's version of the events in July 2020.

In August 2020, while promoting an interview with wrestler Karrion Kross, Savinovich claimed in a live broadcast that Kross had allegedly been a hitman for the mob in his youth. Hours later, Savinovich retracted the statement and apologized to Kross, stating that there was a mistranslation of his words into English. However, video of the interview disputed this. Súper Luchas denied that Kross had been a real killer in his youth, stating that Savinovich only wanted to generate money for his YouTube channel Lucha Libre Online by exaggerating stories. Savinovich later claimed that Kross called him quite angrily to ask for an explanation for his words.

During 2020 he started many auctions with the stated goal of trying to raise money for poor communities. However, this has been questioned since less money has been sent to the beneficiaries and also due to the delivery of that money to other evangelical pastors led by Savinovich.

== Personal life ==
Savinovich was once married to former WWF women's champion Wendi Richter until the couple divorced. In 1990 he married Diana Mendéz and has two sons, Jovannie and Genaro. Diana Mendéz died on November 1, 2019, after a long battle with cancer.

On March 22, 1997, Savinovich suffered a severe episode of depression due to drug use and various personal problems that almost led him to attempt suicide in a hotel in Rosemont, Illinois, just one day before WrestleMania 13. In April of that year he was arrested in a raid on his apartment in New York City. He returned to WWE in 1998, after being sentenced to eight years in jail for which he spent on probation.

Savinovich is a born-again Christian and travels most of South and Central America sharing his Christian testimony. He is the author of his own autobiography book, Atángana Ring de Tentaciones. He has announced that he would publish a second book in 2024.

== Championships and accomplishments ==
- Dominican Wrestling Federation
  - DWF World Tag Team Championship (4 times) – with Relámpago Hernández
- L&G Promotions
  - L&G Caribbean Heavyweight Championship (4 times)
- Western States Sports
  - NWA Western States Tag Team Championship (1 time) – with Mitsu Ishikawa

== Luchas de Apuestas record ==
Winner (wager)	Loser (wager)	Location	Event	Date	Notes
El Profe (mask)	Hugo Savinovich (hair)	San Juan, Puerto Rico	3 Kings Day card	January 6, 1988	

== In other media ==
He is portrayed by Puerto Rican actor Luis Ponce in the Eduardo “Transfor” Ortiz movie Las Super Estrellas de la Lucha Libre, based on Puerto Rican wrestling in Puerto Rico in the 1980s.
