= List of World Heavyweight Champions (WWE, 2002–2013) =

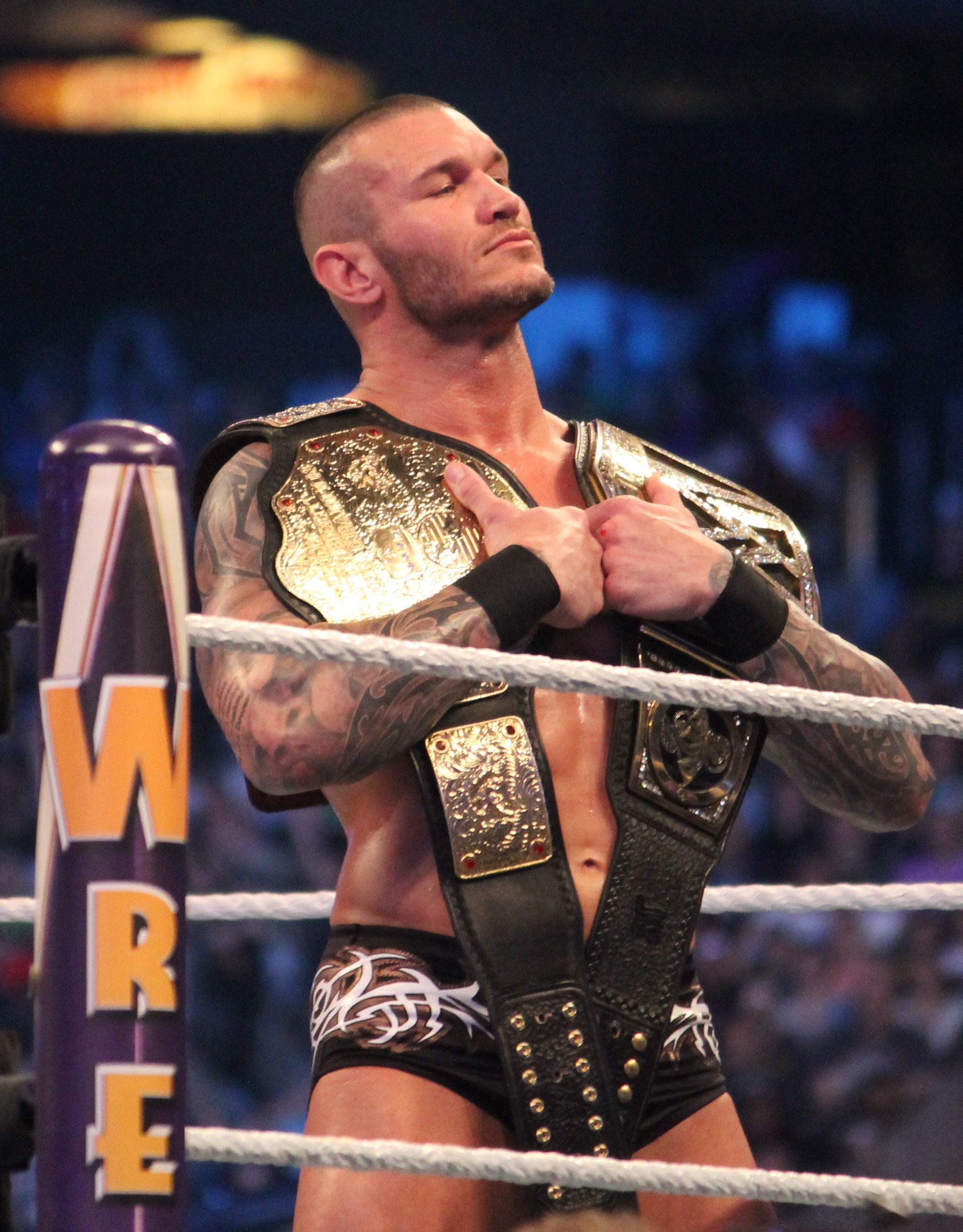
Youngest, four-time and final champion Randy Orton

The World Heavyweight Championship was a men's professional wrestling world heavyweight championship in WWE. It was established by WWE in 2002 after WWE bought out World Championship Wrestling (WCW) and Extreme Championship Wrestling (ECW), and split its roster into two brands, Raw and SmackDown!, in a brand extension. WWE's original world title, the WWE Championship, with which the WCW World Heavyweight Championship had been unified in 2001, was designated to the SmackDown! brand; as a result, the World Heavyweight Championship was established for the Raw brand. Although both titles used the "Big Gold Belt" design, the World Heavyweight Championship was not a continuation of the WCW World Heavyweight Championship but rather its indirect successor.

At the TLC: Tables, Ladders & Chairs pay-per-view on December 15, 2013, when WWE Champion Randy Orton defeated World Heavyweight Champion John Cena, the World Heavyweight Championship was unified with the WWE Championship, resulting in the retiring of the former, and the renaming of the latter to the WWE World Heavyweight Championship. The championship was contested in professional wrestling matches, in which participants execute scripted finishes. The first champion was Triple H, who was awarded the title on September 2, 2002, by Eric Bischoff, then-General Manager of Raw, and he also holds the record for longest combined reign at 616 days. Overall, there have been 25 different official champions, with Edge having the most reigns at seven. The longest single reign was held by Batista, lasting 282 days. The final holder was Orton, who was also the youngest champion at the age of 24 when he first won the championship, as well as the shortest reigning champion in his fourth and final reign, immediately retiring the title after winning and unifying it with the WWE Championship. The Undertaker was the oldest champion when he won the title for the third time at the age of 44 years.

== Title history ==
=== Names ===
Name	Years
World Heavyweight Championship	September 2, 2002 – December 15, 2013
World Championship	April 2, 2006 – July 23, 2006; June 20, 2010 – July 18, 2010 (Note: During Rey Mysterio's reigns in 2006 and 2010, the title was referred to as the World Championship due to Mysterio not being a heavyweight.)

=== Reigns ===
Key
No.	Overall reign number
Reign	Reign number for the specific champion
Days	Number of days held
Days recog.	Number of days held recognized by the promotion
<1	Reign lasted less than a day

No.	Champion	Championship change			Reign statistics			Notes	Ref.
No.	Champion	Date	Event	Location	Reign	Days	Days recog.	Notes	Ref.
WWE: Raw
1	Triple H	September 2, 2002	Raw	Milwaukee, WI	1	76	75	Triple H had originally defeated The Undertaker on the August 26, 2002 edition of Raw to become the number one contender for Brock Lesnar's Undisputed WWE Championship. However, shortly after this, SmackDown general manager Stephanie McMahon informed Raw general manager Eric Bischoff that she had signed Lesnar to an exclusive contract. Bischoff responded by awarding Triple H the Big Gold Belt and declaring him the World Heavyweight Champion (Lesnar remained the WWE Champion). At No Mercy on October 20, 2002, Triple H defeated Intercontinental Champion Kane to unify the WWE Intercontinental Championship into the World Heavyweight Championship.	
2	Shawn Michaels	November 17, 2002	Survivor Series	New York, NY	1	28	27	This was the first Elimination Chamber match, also involving Chris Jericho, Booker T, Rob Van Dam, and Kane.	
3	Triple H	December 15, 2002	Armageddon	Sunrise, FL	2	280	279	This was a Three Stages of Hell match, where the three stages were a Street Fight, a Steel Cage match, and a Ladder match; Triple H won the first and third falls.	
4	Goldberg	September 21, 2003	Unforgiven	Hershey, PA	1	84	83	This was a Title vs. Career match. If Triple H was counted out or disqualified, he would lose the title. If Goldberg lost, he would be forced to retire.	
5	Triple H	December 14, 2003	Armageddon	Orlando, FL	3	91	90	This was a triple threat match also involving Kane.	
6	Chris Benoit	March 14, 2004	WrestleMania XX	New York, NY	1	154	153	This was a triple threat match also involving Shawn Michaels and Triple H.	
7	Randy Orton	August 15, 2004	SummerSlam	Toronto, ON, Canada	1	28	27		
8	Triple H	September 12, 2004	Unforgiven	Portland, OR	4	85	84		
—	Vacated	December 6, 2004	Raw	Baltimore, MD	—	—	—	The championship was vacated after a double fall occurred in a triple threat match also involving Chris Benoit and Edge.	
9	Triple H	January 9, 2005	New Year's Revolution	San Juan, PR	5	84	83	Defeated Chris Benoit, Chris Jericho, Randy Orton, Batista, and Edge in an Elimination Chamber match for the vacant title. Shawn Michaels was the special guest referee.	
10	Batista	April 3, 2005	WrestleMania 21	Los Angeles, CA	1	282	281	Batista and reigning WWE Champion John Cena switched brands in the 2005 WWE Draft, with Cena going to Raw and Batista to SmackDown.	
WWE: SmackDown!
—	Vacated	January 10, 2006	SmackDown!	Philadelphia, PA	—	—	—	Batista vacated the title after he was sidelined with a legit triceps injury. Aired on tape delay on January 13, 2006.	
11	Kurt Angle	January 10, 2006	SmackDown!	Philadelphia, PA	1	82	81	This was a 20-man battle royal for the vacant title. Aired on tape delay on January 13, 2006.	
12	Rey Mysterio	April 2, 2006	WrestleMania 22	Rosemont, IL	1	112	111	This was a triple threat match, also involving Randy Orton who Mysterio pinned. The championship was referred to as the "World Championship" due to Mysterio not being a heavyweight.	
13	King Booker	July 23, 2006	The Great American Bash	Indianapolis, IN	1	126	125		
14	Batista	November 26, 2006	Survivor Series	Philadelphia, PA	2	126	125	This was a Last Chance match. If King Booker was disqualified or counted out, he would lose the title.	
15	The Undertaker	April 1, 2007	WrestleMania 23	Detroit, MI	1	37	36		
16	Edge	May 8, 2007	SmackDown!	Pittsburgh, PA	1	70	69	This was Edge's Money in the Bank cash-in match. Following the win, Edge transferred from Raw to SmackDown!. Aired on tape delay on May 11, 2007.	
—	Vacated	July 17, 2007	SmackDown!	Laredo, TX	—	—	—	Edge vacated the title after he was sidelined with a legit pectoral injury. Aired on tape delay on July 20, 2007.	
17	The Great Khali	July 17, 2007	SmackDown!	Laredo, TX	1	61	60	This was a 20-man battle royal for the vacant title. Aired on tape delay on July 20, 2007.	
18	Batista	September 16, 2007	Unforgiven	Memphis, TN	3	91	90	This was a triple threat match also involving Rey Mysterio.	
19	Edge	December 16, 2007	Armageddon	Pittsburgh, PA	2	105	105	This was a triple threat match also involving The Undertaker.	
20	The Undertaker	March 30, 2008	WrestleMania XXIV	Orlando, FL	2	30	32	WWE recognizes The Undertaker's reign as ending on May 2, 2008, when the following episode aired on tape delay.	
—	Vacated	April 29, 2008	SmackDown	Atlantic City, NJ	—	—	—	SmackDown General Manager Vickie Guerrero stripped The Undertaker of the title for using the Hell's Gate submission hold, which she deemed to be dangerous. Aired on tape delay on May 2, 2008.	
21	Edge	June 1, 2008	One Night Stand	San Diego, CA	3	29	28	Defeated The Undertaker in a Tables, Ladders, and Chairs match to win the vacant title. Per the pre-match stipulation, Undertaker was (kayfabe) banished from WWE.	
22	CM Punk	June 30, 2008	Raw	Oklahoma City, OK	1	69	68	This was Punk's Money in the Bank cash-in match. The title moved to Raw due to Punk's status as a Raw wrestler as Punk was drafted to Raw the week prior in the 2008 WWE Draft. The WWE Championship moved to the SmackDown brand a week prior due to the draft as then WWE Champion Triple H was drafted to SmackDown.	
WWE: Raw
23	Chris Jericho	September 7, 2008	Unforgiven	Cleveland, OH	1	49	48	This was a Championship Scramble also involving John "Bradshaw" Layfield, Batista, Rey Mysterio, and Kane. Jericho was a late replacement for champion CM Punk, who was attacked by Legacy prior to the match.	
24	Batista	October 26, 2008	Cyber Sunday	Phoenix, AZ	4	8	7	Stone Cold Steve Austin was the special guest referee.	
25	Chris Jericho	November 3, 2008	Raw	Tampa, FL	2	20	19	This was a Steel Cage match.	
26	John Cena	November 23, 2008	Survivor Series	Boston, MA	1	84	83		
27	Edge	February 15, 2009	No Way Out	Seattle, WA	4	49	48	This was an Elimination Chamber match, also involving Chris Jericho, Rey Mysterio, Mike Knox, and Kane. Edge, a member of the SmackDown roster, attacked Kofi Kingston and replaced him in the match. The title became exclusive to SmackDown due to Edge's status as a SmackDown wrestler.	
WWE: SmackDown
28	John Cena	April 5, 2009	WrestleMania 25	Houston, TX	2	21	20	This was a triple threat match also involving Big Show, whom Cena pinned. The title became exclusive to the Raw brand due to Cena's status as a Raw wrestler.	
WWE: Raw
29	Edge	April 26, 2009	Backlash	Providence, RI	5	42	41	This was a Last Man Standing match. The title was returned to SmackDown due to Edge's status as a SmackDown wrestler. Two weeks prior to the event, then WWE Champion Triple H was drafted to Raw in the 2009 WWE Draft.	
WWE: SmackDown
30	Jeff Hardy	June 7, 2009	Extreme Rules	New Orleans, LA	1	<1	<1	This was a Ladder match.	
31	CM Punk	June 7, 2009	Extreme Rules	New Orleans, LA	2	49	48	This was Punk's Money in the Bank cash-in match.	
32	Jeff Hardy	July 26, 2009	Night of Champions	Philadelphia, PA	2	28	27		
33	CM Punk	August 23, 2009	SummerSlam	Los Angeles, CA	3	42	41	This was a Tables, Ladders, and Chairs match.	
34	The Undertaker	October 4, 2009	Hell in a Cell	Newark, NJ	3	140	139	This was a Hell in a Cell match.	
35	Chris Jericho	February 21, 2010	Elimination Chamber	St. Louis, MO	3	37	39	This was an Elimination Chamber match, also involving John Morrison, R-Truth, CM Punk, and Rey Mysterio. WWE recognizes Jericho's reign as ending on April 2, 2010, when the following episode aired on tape delay.	
36	Jack Swagger	March 30, 2010	SmackDown	Las Vegas, NV	1	82	78	Cashed in his Money in the Bank contract. Swagger transferred from Raw to SmackDown upon winning the title. WWE recognizes Swagger's reign as beginning on April 2, 2010, when the episode aired on tape delay.	
37	Rey Mysterio	June 20, 2010	Fatal 4-Way	Uniondale, NY	2	28	27	This was a fatal four-way match also involving Big Show and CM Punk. The championship was referred to as the "World Championship" due to Mysterio not being a heavyweight.	
38	Kane	July 18, 2010	Money in the Bank	Kansas City, MO	1	154	153	This was Kane's Money in the Bank cash-in match.	
39	Edge	December 19, 2010	TLC: Tables, Ladders & Chairs	Houston, TX	6	58	60	This was a fatal four-way Tables, Ladders, and Chairs match also involving Alberto Del Rio and Rey Mysterio. WWE recognizes Edge's reign as ending on February 18, 2011, when the following episode aired on tape delay.	
—	Vacated	February 15, 2011	SmackDown	San Diego, CA	—	—	—	Edge was stripped of the title by SmackDown General Manager Vickie Guerrero as a result of using the spear (which had been banned) in a previous match. Aired on tape delay on February 18, 2011.	
40	Dolph Ziggler	February 15, 2011	SmackDown	San Diego, CA	1	<1	<1	Awarded the title by SmackDown General Manager Vickie Guerrero. Aired on tape delay on February 18, 2011, the date WWE recognizes for the reign.	
41	Edge	February 15, 2011	SmackDown	San Diego, CA	7	56	54	WWE recognizes Edge's reign as beginning on February 18, 2011, and ending on April 15, 2011, both episodes of which aired on tape delay.	
—	Vacated	April 12, 2011	SmackDown	Albany, NY	—	—	—	Edge relinquished the title when he announced his immediate retirement as a result of being diagnosed with spinal stenosis. Aired on tape delay on April 15, 2011.	
42	Christian	May 1, 2011	Extreme Rules	Tampa, FL	1	2	4	Defeated Alberto Del Rio in a Ladder match to win the vacant title. WWE recognizes Christian's reign as ending on May 6, 2011, when the following episode aired on tape delay.	
43	Randy Orton	May 3, 2011	SmackDown	Orlando, FL	2	75	71	WWE recognizes Orton's reign as beginning on May 6, 2011, when the episode aired on tape delay.	
44	Christian	July 17, 2011	Money in the Bank	Rosemont, IL	2	28	27	Defeated Randy Orton by disqualification after being hit with a low-blow. The stipulations of the match allowed the title to change hands via disqualification.	
45	Randy Orton	August 14, 2011	SummerSlam	Los Angeles, CA	3	35	34	This was a No Holds Barred match. On August 29, 2011, the first brand extension ended, allowing the World Heavyweight Champion to appear on both Raw and SmackDown.	
WWE (unbranded)
46	Mark Henry	September 18, 2011	Night of Champions	Buffalo, NY	1	91	91		
47	Big Show	December 18, 2011	TLC: Tables, Ladders & Chairs	Baltimore, MD	1	<1	<1	This was a Chairs match.	
48	Daniel Bryan	December 18, 2011	TLC: Tables, Ladders & Chairs	Baltimore, MD	1	105	104	This was Bryan's Money in the Bank cash-in match.	
49	Sheamus	April 1, 2012	WrestleMania XXVIII	Miami Gardens, FL	1	210	210		
50	Big Show	October 28, 2012	Hell in a Cell	Atlanta, GA	2	72	72		
51	Alberto Del Rio	January 8, 2013	SmackDown	Miami, FL	1	90	89	This was a Last Man Standing match. Aired on tape delay on January 11, 2013.	
52	Dolph Ziggler	April 8, 2013	Raw	East Rutherford, NJ	2	69	69	This was Ziggler's Money in the Bank cash-in match.	
53	Alberto Del Rio	June 16, 2013	Payback	Rosemont, IL	2	133	133		
54	John Cena	October 27, 2013	Hell in a Cell	Miami, FL	3	49	49		
55	Randy Orton	December 15, 2013	TLC: Tables, Ladders & Chairs	Houston, TX	4	<1	<1	This was a Tables, Ladders, and Chairs title unification match in which Orton also defended his WWE Championship.	
—	Unified	December 15, 2013	TLC: Tables, Ladders & Chairs	Houston, TX	—	—	—	Randy Orton defeated John Cena to unify the World Heavyweight Championship with the WWE Championship. The World Heavyweight Championship was retired and the WWE Championship became the WWE World Heavyweight Championship.	

== Combined reigns ==
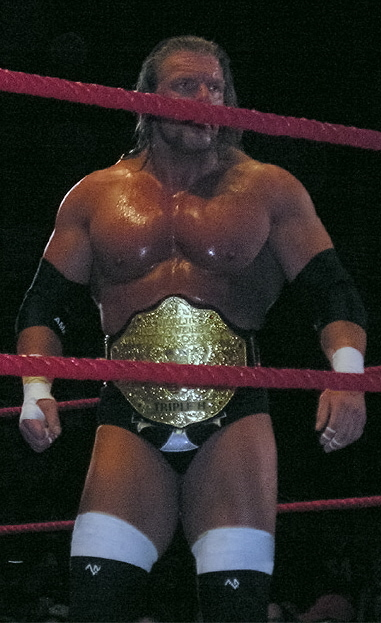
Inaugural, five-time and longest combined reigning champion Triple H

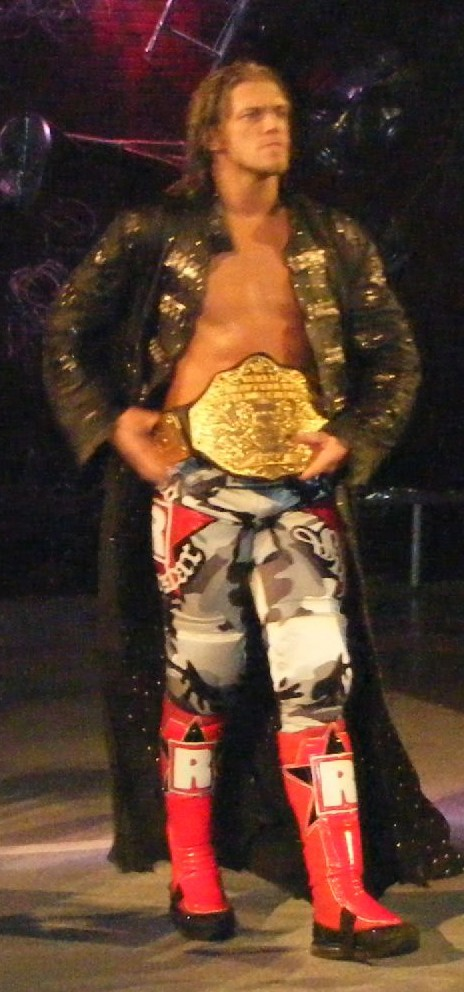
Record seven-time champion Edge

Rank	Wrestler	No. of reigns	Combined days	Combined days recognized by WWE
1	Triple H	5	616	611
2	Batista	4	507	503
3	Edge	7	409	405
4	Alberto Del Rio	2	223	222
5	Sheamus	1	210	
6	The Undertaker	3	207	
7	CM Punk	3	160	157
8	Chris Benoit	1	154	153
8	Kane	1	154	153
8	John Cena	3	154	152
11	Rey Mysterio	2	140	138
12	Randy Orton	4	138	132
13	King Booker	1	126	125
14	Chris Jericho	3	106	
15	Daniel Bryan	1	105	104
16	Mark Henry	1	91	
17	Goldberg	1	84	83
18	Jack Swagger	1	82	78
18	Kurt Angle	1	82	81
20	Big Show	2	72	
21	Dolph Ziggler	2	69	
22	The Great Khali	1	61	60
23	Christian	2	30	32
24	Jeff Hardy	2	28	27
24	Shawn Michaels	1	28	27

== See also ==
- List of NWA World Heavyweight Champions
- List of WCW World Heavyweight Champions
- World championships in WWE
