= Night of Champions (2008) =

World Wrestling Entertainment pay-per-view event

- Promotional poster featuring Edge, Matt Hardy, Kane, Chris Jericho, Mickie James, and Triple H
- Promotion: World Wrestling Entertainment
- Brand(s): Raw; SmackDown; ECW
- Date: June 29, 2008
- City: Dallas, Texas
- Venue: American Airlines Center
- Attendance: 16,151
- Buy rate: 273,000
- Tagline: It's a Night of Defenders, It's a Night of Challengers, It's a Night of Champions.

Pay-per-view chronology
← Previous; One Night Stand	Next → The Great American Bash

Night of Champions chronology
← Previous; Vengeance: Night of Champions	Next → 2009

The 2008 Night of Champions was a professional wrestling pay-per-view (PPV) event produced by World Wrestling Entertainment (WWE). It was the second annual Night of Champions and took place on June 29, 2008, at the American Airlines Center in Dallas, Texas, held for wrestlers from the promotion's Raw, SmackDown, and ECW brand divisions. The theme of the event was that all eight of WWE's active championships at the time were defended.

While this was the second Night of Champions, it was the first to be promoted solely under the Night of Champions name. The first event was a cross-promotional event with the annual Vengeance called Vengeance: Night of Champions. For 2008, WWE discontinued Vengeance as the June PPV in favor of Night of Champions.

The main event was an interpromotional match for the WWE Championship between defending champion and SmackDown representative Triple H and Raw representative John Cena; Triple H won the match and retained the championship. Another main match was also an interpromotional match for the World Heavyweight Championship between defending champion and SmackDown representative Edge and Raw representative Batista, which Edge won to retain the championship. At the time of the event, both titles were briefly on SmackDown as the event occurred right after the 2008 WWE Draft; the next night on Raw, the World Heavyweight Championship moved to the brand following a successful Money in the Bank cash-in by CM Punk. One other main match was an interpromotional triple threat match for the ECW Championship, in which ECW representative Mark Henry won the title by defeating SmackDown representative Big Show and defending champion and Raw representative Kane; the title was briefly on Raw also as a result of the draft but moved back to ECW thanks to Henry's win.

Night of Champions received 273,000 pay-per-view buys, and was instrumental in helping WWE increase its pay-per-view revenue by $21.9 million compared to the previous year. The professional wrestling section of the Canadian Online Explorer website rated the entire event a 7 out of 10 stars, higher and lower than the 2007 event's ratings of 5 and 7.5 out of 10 (there were two ratings because two different writers reviewed the show). It was also the first Night of Champions PPV broadcast in high definition.

== Production ==
=== Background ===
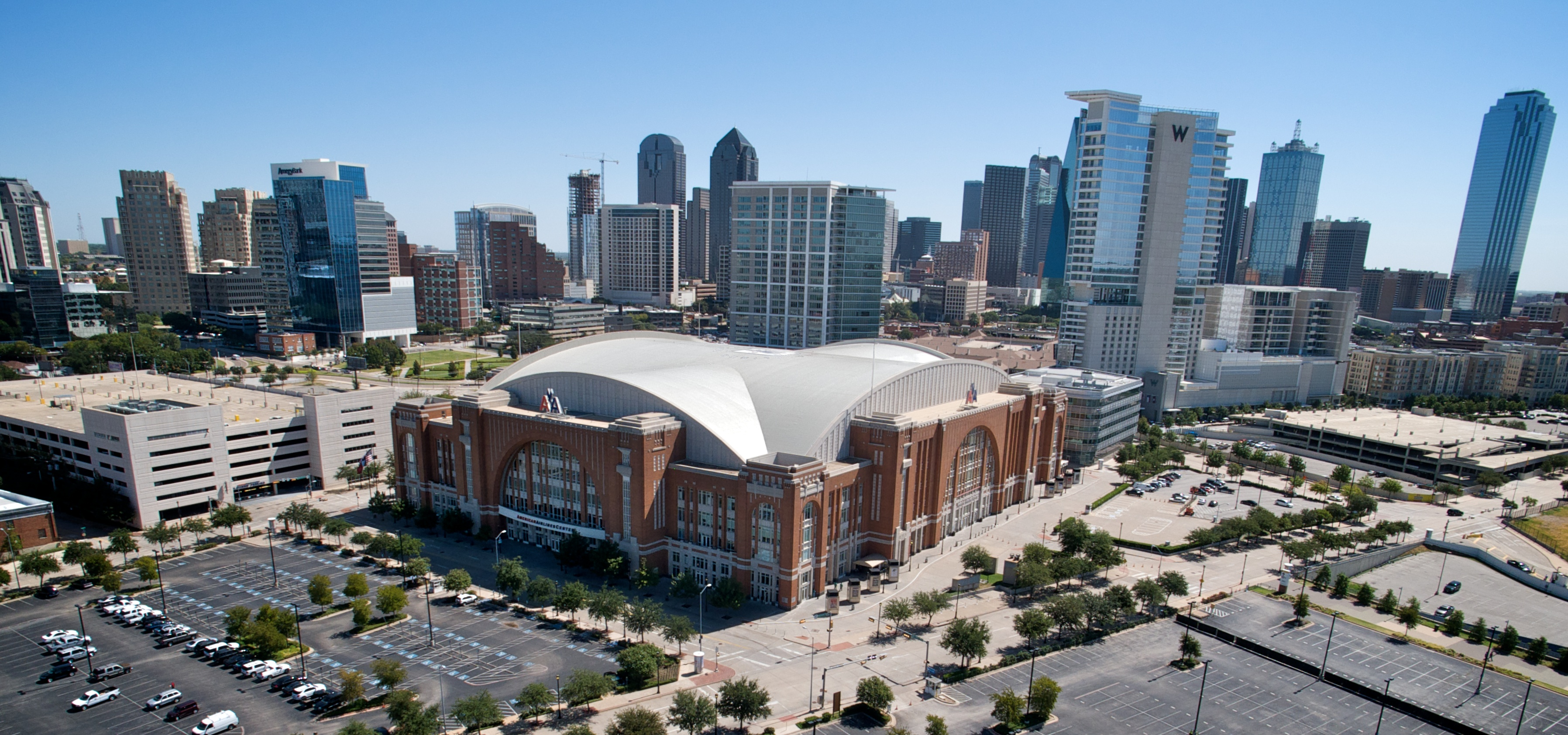
The second annual Night of Champions was held at the American Airlines Center in Dallas, Texas.

From 2001 to 2007, World Wrestling Entertainment (WWE) promoted an annual professional wrestling pay-per-view (PPV) event titled Vengeance. The seventh annual event in 2007 was held under the title Vengeance: Night of Champions with a theme that all of WWE's active championships at the time were defended. This would be the final Vengeance (until 2011) as WWE decided to drop the event in 2008 in favor of continuing Night of Champions as the annual June PPV. This second annual Night of Champions—and the first to be promoted solely as Night of Champions—was scheduled for June 29, 2008, at the American Airlines Center in Dallas, Texas. It featured wrestlers from the Raw, SmackDown, and ECW brand divisions.

As per the theme of the event, every active championship promoted by WWE at the time was defended. As a result of the 2008 WWE Draft, which happened the week before the event, several titles switched brands, including SmackDown briefly becoming the home of two of the world championships. At the time of the 2008 Night of Champions, the championships for each brand included the four on Raw—the ECW Championship, the Intercontinental Championship, the World Tag Team Championship, and the WWE Women's Championship—the three on SmackDown—the WWE Championship, the World Heavyweight Championship, and the WWE Tag Team Championship—and ECW's only title—the United States Championship. Although SmackDown and ECW claimed ownership of their respective titles, a talent exchange agreement existed between the two brands, allowing wrestlers to challenge for either brands' championships.

=== Storylines ===
The event featured eight professional wrestling matches that resulted from scripted storylines. Results were predetermined by WWE's writers on the Raw, SmackDown, and ECW brands, while storylines were produced on WWE's weekly television shows, Monday Night Raw, SmackDown, and ECW.

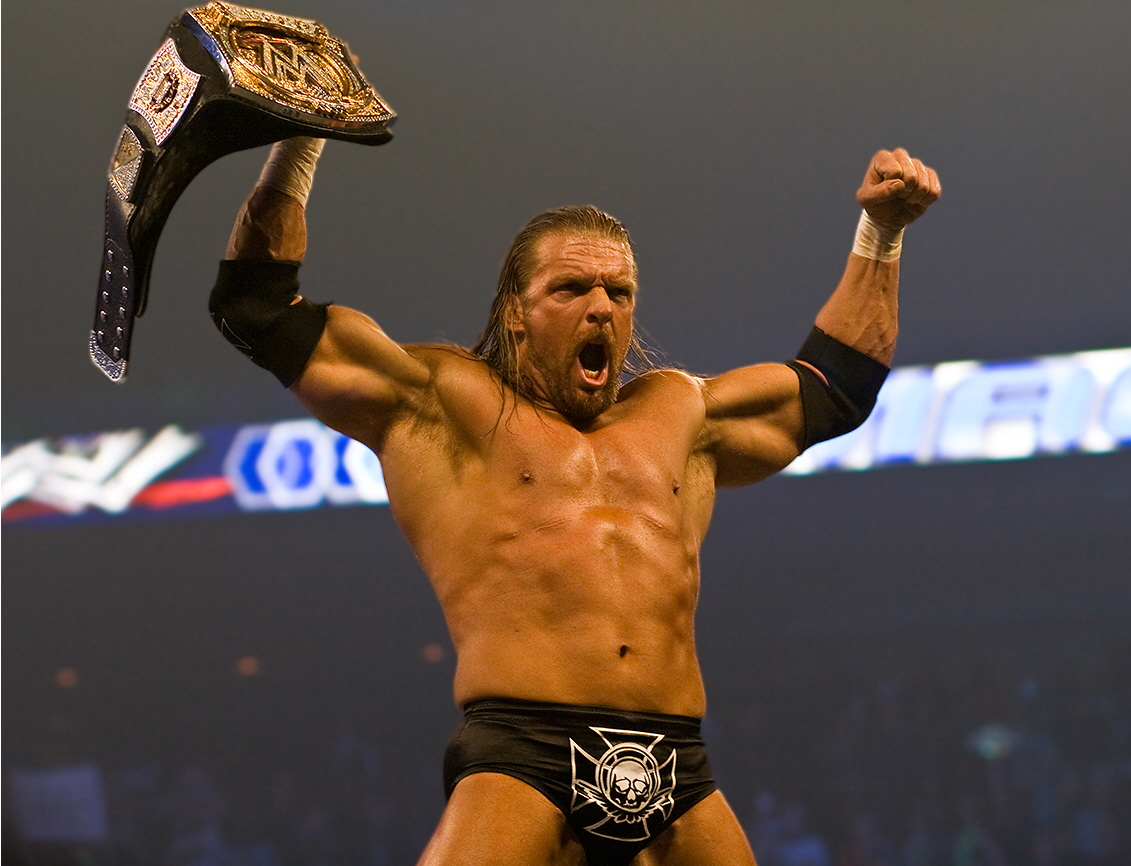
Triple H as SmackDown's WWE Champion.

The main event of Night of Champions on the Raw brand was between Triple H and John Cena over the WWE Championship. At the Royal Rumble, Cena won the Royal Rumble match, where he earned the right to challenge for the WWE Championship at WrestleMania XXIV. The next night on Raw, Cena stated that he did not want to wait until WrestleMania for a title match, and decided that he wanted to face then champion Randy Orton for the title on that same episode. Orton declined to defend the title on Raw, but proposed to Cena that they could meet at WWE's next pay-per-view event, No Way Out, in a title match, to which Cena agreed. At No Way Out, Cena defeated Orton by disqualification, but did not win the title because a title can only change hands via pinfall or submission. That same night, Triple H won an Elimination Chamber match, where the ring is surrounded by a steel structure of chain and girders, to earn a title shot at WrestleMania. The night after No Way Out, Cena demanded that he receive a title rematch, following his match with Orton, but Raw General manager William Regal, a portrayed match maker and rules enforcer, announced that Cena and Orton would be facing each other in a non-title match, with Triple H as the special guest referee, in the main event later that night, with the stipulation that if Cena won, he would join the title match at WrestleMania, making it a triple threat match. Cena won the match, making him part of the main event at WrestleMania. At WrestleMania, Orton defeated Triple H and Cena to retain the title, after pinning Cena. At Backlash, Orton defended the title once again against Cena and Triple H, this time in a fatal four-way elimination match which also included John "Bradshaw" Layfield (JBL). Triple H won the match after eliminating Orton last to win the title. On the June 2 episode of Raw, Cena faced Jeff Hardy, with the stipulation being that if Cena or Hardy won they would earn a title shot against Triple H at Night of Champions. Cena won the match to challenge Triple H for the title at Night of Champions. On the June 23 episode of Raw, during the fifth annual WWE Draft, Triple H was drafted to the SmackDown brand, making the WWE Championship exclusive to SmackDown. On the June 27 episode of SmackDown, it was revealed that Triple H would still defend the title against Cena.

The main feud on the SmackDown brand was between Edge and Batista over the World Heavyweight Championship. On the June 6 episode of SmackDown, Batista, Funaki, Nunzio, and Colin Delaney defeated Edge, Chavo Guerrero Jr., Curt Hawkins and Zack Ryder in an eight-man tag team match. A stipulation was placed in the match that if Batista's team won the tag team match, Batista earned a World title match against Edge at Night of Champions. The following week, SmackDown General Manager Vickie Guerrero added a predicament to Batista's title shot, stating that in order for the title match to occur at Night of Champions, Batista would have to defeat The Great Khali to finalize his title shot. Batista defeated Khali and retained his title shot. On the June 23 episode of Raw, Batista was drafted to the Raw brand as a part of the 2008 WWE Draft. That same night, WWE Chairman Vince McMahon informed Edge that he would still defend the title against Batista at Night of Champions.

The other predominant title match on the ECW brand was between ECW Champion Kane defending the title against Big Show and Mark Henry in a Triple Threat match. At One Night Stand, Big Show won a five-man Singapore Cane match including CM Punk, Chavo Guerrero, Tommy Dreamer, and John Morrison to earn a title shot against Kane at Night of Champions. On the June 23 episode of Raw, Kane was drafted to the Raw brand, making the ECW Championship exclusive to Raw. During the supplemental draft, Henry was drafted to the ECW brand. It was announced on WWE's official website that Henry would be added to the title match, making it a triple threat match.

Another title match on the Raw brand scheduled for the event was for the WWE Intercontinental Championship. The defending champion Chris Jericho however was embroiled in a feud with Shawn Michaels. On the June 9 episode of Raw, Michaels was a guest on Jericho's talk show segment The Highlight Reel where he revealed that he lied to Jericho about his knee injury during his match with Batista at Backlash and was faking it the whole time. Jericho in response to this turned heel and attacked Michaels throwing him against the Jeritron 3000 television screen and shattering it (the same way Michaels threw Marty Jannetty against the Barbershop window in 1991). As a result of the attack, Michaels had suffered an injury to his left eye and was not seen for several weeks afterwards. On the June 16 episode of Raw, Lance Cade aligned with Jericho and the two of them attacked Triple H and John Cena. Cade later explained that he was one of Michaels' best students in the Texas Wrestling Academy and stated that when he made it big he knew Michaels would pretend to be his friend and then turn on him (in response to Michaels' villain turns over the last few years). As a result of that Cade stated that won't give Michaels a chance to turn on him like he did others and added that unlike the fans he appreciates Jericho. Jericho stated that his attack on Michaels was in direct response to the fans supporting Michaels rather than supporting Jericho and claimed that he will save himself from now on. Kofi Kingston who had been drafted from the ECW brand to Raw via the Supplemental Draft was announced as Jericho's opponent for Night of Champions.

Each of the three top title feuds were affected by the 2008 WWE Draft and an additional Supplemental Draft held two days later on WWE's official website. As a result, each of the world title matches became interpromotional matches between the Raw, SmackDown, and ECW brands with the winner of each match determining the championships for each brand.

== Event ==
Other on-screen personnel
Role:	Name:
English commentators
English commentators	Michael Cole (Raw)
English commentators	Jerry Lawler (Raw)
English commentators	Jim Ross (SmackDown)
English commentators	Mick Foley (SmackDown)
English commentators	Mike Adamle (ECW)
English commentators	Tazz (ECW)
Spanish commentators	Carlos Cabrera
Spanish commentators	Hugo Savinovich
Backstage interviewers	Eve Torres
Backstage interviewers	Todd Grisham
Ring announcers	Lilian Garcia (Raw)
Ring announcers	Justin Roberts (SmackDown)
Ring announcers	Tony Chimel (ECW)
Referees	John Cone
Referees	Mike Chioda
Referees	Marty Elias
Referees	Chad Patton
Referees	Charles Robinson
Referees	Mickie Henson
Referees	Scott Armstrong
Referees	Mike Posey
Referees	Jim Korderas
Referees	Jack Doan

Before the event went live on pay-per-view, Jeff Hardy defeated Montel Vontavious Porter (MVP) in a dark match after performing a Swanton bomb.

=== Preliminary matches ===
The first televised match saw John Morrison and The Miz defend the WWE Tag Team Championship against Finlay and Hornswoggle. The match began with Finlay in the ring as he crotched Morrison on the ring apron. Back in the ring, Morrison performed a dropkick on Finlay. Throughout the match, Miz and Morrison were in control. Hornswoggle was tagged in the match, which led to him to execute a hurricanrana, a stunner and a bulldog into the mat on Miz. Back and forth action took place between both teams. The match concluded with Finlay performing the Celtic Cross on Morrison, but Miz knocked Finlay out of the ring, before he could pin Morrison. Morrison then gained consciousness. He then pushed Hornswoggle off the top ropes and slammed him into the ring mat to gain the win and retain the tag titles.

The next match was for the WWE United States Championship, in which Matt Hardy defended the title against Chavo Guerrero accompanied with Bam Neely. Guerrero dominated most of the match and worked on Hardy's left knee. Neely, who was at ringside, did as well, as he grabbed Hardy's leg around the ring post at ringside, while Guerrero distracted the referee. Guerrero tried to perform a Frog splash, but Hardy moved out of the way. The match ended as Hardy avoided a vertical suplex, dubbed as the Three Amigos. Hardy executed a Twist of Fate, which he followed with a cover and a pinfall, thus retaining the WWE United States Championship.

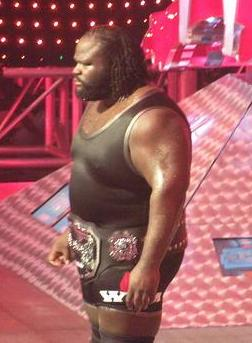
ECW representative Mark Henry became the new ECW Champion, returning the title back to the ECW brand.

The third match was a triple threat match for the ECW Championship, in which Kane defended the title against Big Show and Mark Henry. The match began with Big Show and Kane double teaming Henry and focusing on one another. Big Show tossed Kane over the top rope. That incident saw trainers and emergency medical technicians (EMTs) attend to Kane at ringside. In the ring, Big Show was able to get the upper hand over Henry. Kane returned to the match, which saw him perform a flying clothesline on Henry and executed an uppercut on Big Show. That proceeded with Kane going back and forth splashing Henry and Big Show in the corner before being caught in a bear hug hold by Henry. Kane managed to get out of the hold, which led to both Kane and Big Show to double chokeslam into the mat. Afterwards, Kane performed a superplex on Big Show off the top rope, but Henry performed a splash on Kane. Henry covered Kane for the pinfall victory and thus becoming the new ECW champion. Since Mark Henry won the title, the belt went back to the ECW brand.

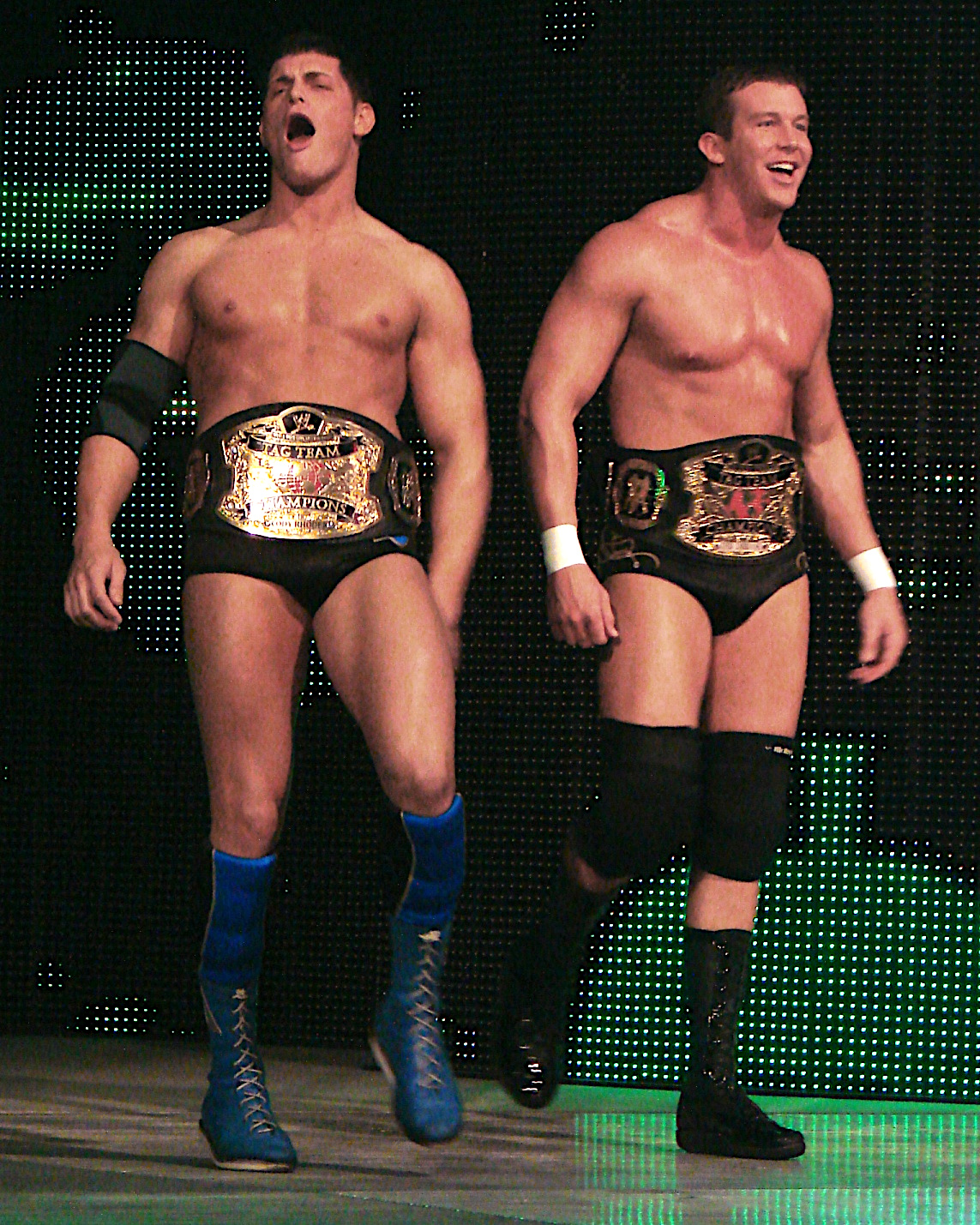
Cody Rhodes and Ted DiBiase, who became Raw's World Tag Team Champions.

The match that followed was for the World Tag Team Championship, in which champions Hardcore Holly and Cody Rhodes defended the titles against Ted DiBiase and a mystery partner. Before the match got underway, DiBiase grabbed the microphone and said his partner had text messaged him saying that he was running late and asked for the match to be rescheduled. Not wanting to forfeit, DiBiase said he would take on Holly and Rhodes in a two-on-one handicap match and promised that his partner would be there soon. The match began with Rhodes and DiBiase in the ring. DiBiase, however, said that he wanted to face Holly instead. Holly was tagged in, but Rhodes turned on Holly and attacked him, turning heel in the process. DiBiase then introduced Rhodes as his tag team partner. Rhodes switched sides and tagged in DiBiase, who then performed the Million Dollar Dream on Holly to win the match, with DiBiase and Rhodes becoming the new World Tag Team Champions.

The next match was for the WWE Intercontinental Championship, in which Chris Jericho defended the title against Kofi Kingston, who was drafted to Raw in the Supplemental Draft. In the beginning of the match, Kingston gained the upper hand over Jericho, as he performed a body-block. Kingston followed this by leaping onto Jericho on the top ring corner. Though, Jericho shoved him to the ring floor. Back in the ring, Jericho followed his assaults by applying an abdominal stretch submission hold, but Kingston escaped the hold. Back and forth action took place between both competitors. Jericho got Kingston in the Walls of Jericho. As Jericho had the hold locked on, Shawn Michaels ran through the crowd and performed Sweet Chin Music on Lance Cade, who was at ringside. As Jericho witnessed the events, he released the submission hold and tackled Michaels off the ring apron. Kingston took the advantage as he performed the Trouble in Paradise and pinned Jericho to become the new Intercontinental Champion.

The sixth match was a singles match for the WWE Women's Championship, in which Mickie James defended the title against Katie Lea Burchill accompanied with Paul Burchill. The beginning of the match saw back and forth action between both females. Lea controlled the match, after she threw James shoulder-first into the middle turnbuckle and worked on James' shoulder. Throughout the match, James began to take the advantage over Lea, but was not successful in doing so. The match concluded when James performed the Mickie DT on Lea, thus winning the match and retaining her title.

=== Main event matches ===
The penultimate match saw Edge defend the World Heavyweight Championship against Batista. For the duration of the match, Batista used his body size to his advantage. Batista sidewalk slammed Edge, after he threw Edge to the ring corner. The match saw back and forth action between both men. Edge tried to perform a shoulder block takedown on Batista, but Batista executed a Big Boot. Midway through the match, Edge's associates, Curt Hawkins and Zack Ryder, wheeled General Manager Vickie Guerrero to ringside to witness the match. Batista hit Edge with the steel steps and performed a spinebuster for a near-fall. Edge went for another shoulder takedown, but Batista managed to move out of the way, which saw Edge crash towards the ringpost and Batista performed a Batista Bomb. Batista covered Edge, as the referee went for the three count, he was removed from the ring by Vickie. The referee began the 10 count on Edge, who left the ring, but Edge hit the official. Vickie proceeded to call in a new referee to the match; Chavo Guerrero came out as the new referee. Following the events, Batista lifted Vickie to the ring and threw her directly onto Hawkins, Ryder, and Guerrero, who were at ringside. Edge took advantage of the situation as he hit Batista with the World title belt. Guerrero entered the ring and gave Edge the victory in the match.

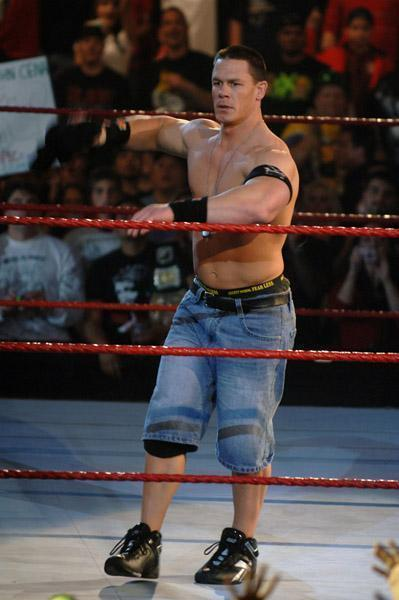
Raw representative John Cena, who challenged Triple H for SmackDown's WWE Championship.

The main event saw Triple H defending the WWE Championship against John Cena. During the start of the match, both men began outperforming each other. Triple H, however, gained the advantage, as he performed a high knee on Cena, followed by a facebuster knee smash. Cena took control after he executing a diving leg drop bulldog. Cena proceeded by trying to perform a Five Knuckle Shuffle but Triple H countered as he was able to perform a spinebuster. Triple H regained control in the match, until Cena picked Triple H up and threw him over the top rope, where Triple H landed awkwardly on his left knee. Cena went to the outside and began to work on Triple H's knee, putting it into the ring post twice. Back in the ring, Cena took the upper hand as he executed a chop block, a shoulder block that targets the back of an opponent's knee, on Triple H's knee. Another moment in the match saw Cena apply the STF on Triple H but Triple H escaped the hold. Cena tried lifting Triple H onto his shoulder, but Triple H countered as he executed a Pedigree. Triple H couldn't cover Cena, as he clutched on to his left knee. Both men were down. Triple H and Cena stood to their feet, leading to Cena executing the FU, only to receive a near-fall. The match concluded with Triple H executing the Pedigree on Cena. Triple H got the pinfall victory, retaining his title and making the belt exclusive to SmackDown.

== Reception ==
The American Airlines Center usually can accommodate 20,000, but the capacity was reduced for the event. This event received 273,000 pay-per-view buys. Night of Champions helped WWE earn $39.8 million in revenue from pay-per-view events versus $17.9 million the previous year, which was later confirmed by Linda McMahon, the CEO of WWE, on August 5, 2008, in a quarterly result. Canadian Online Explorer's professional wrestling section rated the event seven out of 10. The rating was higher and lower than the 2007 Vengeance: Night of Champions event with the rating of 5 and 7.5 out of 10 (there were two ratings because two different writers reviewed the show). The WWE title match between Triple H and John Cena was rated an 8 out of 10. Additionally, the ECW title match between Kane, Mark Henry, and The Big Show was rated a 3 out of 10.

The event was released on DVD on July 29, 2008. The DVD was distributed by the label Sony Music Entertainment.

== Aftermath ==
Following Night of Champions, the Raw brand did not have a top-tier championship belt, as the ECW title was returned to the ECW brand following Mark Henry's win, and Triple H had been drafted to the SmackDown brand, taking the WWE title in the process. On the June 30 episode of Raw, Edge made an appearance, causing Batista to show up and beat him down. Shortly afterwards, Edge lost the World Heavyweight title to CM Punk, after Punk cashed in his Money in the Bank contract, making the World Heavyweight title exclusive to the Raw brand, once more. Punk would lose the title at Unforgiven, after he was unable to compete in the title match at the event, following an attack backstage by Randy Orton. The match was won by Chris Jericho, who was named as his replacement. Mark Henry held the ECW title until Unforgiven, losing to Matt Hardy. Triple H dropped the WWE title at Survivor Series.

At The Great American Bash, WWE's following pay-per-view event, John Morrison and The Miz lost the WWE Tag Team titles to Curt Hawkins and Zack Ryder in a Fatal Four-Way match, which also involved the teams of Jesse and Festus and Finlay and Hornswoggle. At the same event, Shelton Benjamin defeated Matt Hardy for the United States Championship and Michelle McCool became the first ever WWE Divas Champion defeating Natalya in the process. At SummerSlam, Mickie James and Kofi Kingston lost their respective titles in an Intergender tag team match to Beth Phoenix and Santino Marella.

The event would also mark the final appearance of Hardcore Holly. Holly was released from his WWE contract on January 16, 2009, ending his 15-year tenure with the company.

== Results ==
No.	Results	Stipulations	Times
1^{D}	Jeff Hardy defeated Montel Vontavious Porter by pinfall	Singles match	3:34
2	John Morrison and The Miz (c) defeated Finlay and Hornswoggle by pinfall	Tag team match for the WWE Tag Team Championship	8:48
3	Matt Hardy (c) defeated Chavo Guerrero (with Bam Neely) by pinfall	Singles match for the WWE United States Championship	9:20
4	Mark Henry defeated Kane (c) and Big Show by pinfall	Triple threat match for the ECW Championship	8:16
5	Ted DiBiase and Cody Rhodes (c) defeated Hardcore Holly (c)	Handicap match for the World Tag Team Championship	1:28
6	Kofi Kingston defeated Chris Jericho (c) (with Lance Cade) by pinfall	Singles match for the WWE Intercontinental Championship	11:00
7	Mickie James (c) defeated Katie Lea Burchill (with Paul Burchill) by pinfall	Singles match for the WWE Women's Championship	7:20
8	Edge (c) defeated Batista by pinfall	Singles match for the World Heavyweight Championship	16:47
9	Triple H (c) defeated John Cena by pinfall	Singles match for the WWE Championship	19:39
(c) / – the champion(s) heading into the match; D / – this was a dark match
