= One Night Stand (2008) =

World Wrestling Entertainment pay-per-view event

- Promotional poster featuring Kane
- Promotion: World Wrestling Entertainment
- Brand(s): Raw; SmackDown; ECW
- Date: June 1, 2008
- City: San Diego, California
- Venue: San Diego Sports Arena
- Attendance: 9,961
- Buy rate: 194,000
- Tagline: The One Night a Year When the WWE Goes Extreme

Pay-per-view chronology
← Previous; Judgment Day	Next → Night of Champions

One Night Stand chronology
← Previous; 2007	Next → Final

The 2008 One Night Stand, also promoted as One Night Stand: Extreme Rules, was a professional wrestling pay-per-view (PPV) event produced by World Wrestling Entertainment (WWE). It was the fourth annual and final One Night Stand and took place on June 1, 2008, at the San Diego Sports Arena in San Diego, California, held for wrestlers from the promotion's Raw, SmackDown, and ECW brand divisions. The theme of the event was that it featured hardcore-based matches. One Night Stand was discontinued and replaced by the similarly themed Extreme Rules in 2009.

Eight matches were contested at the event, including one dark match that occurred before the live broadcast. The main match on the SmackDown brand was a Tables, Ladders, and Chairs match for the vacant World Heavyweight Championship between Edge and The Undertaker, which Edge won after retrieving the belt suspended above the ring. Per the pre-match stipulation, Undertaker was forced to leave WWE. The predominant match on the Raw brand was a Last Man Standing match for the WWE Championship between Triple H and Randy Orton, which Triple H won to retain after Orton failed to answer the ten-count.

The primary match on the ECW brand was a Singapore Cane match involving Big Show, CM Punk, John Morrison, Chavo Guerrero, and Tommy Dreamer. Big Show won the match after pinning Dreamer to become the number-one contender to the ECW Championship at Night of Champions. Featured matches on the undercard included Shawn Michaels versus Batista in a stretcher match, John Cena versus John "Bradshaw" Layfield (JBL) in a First Blood match, and Beth Phoenix and Melina in the first-ever women's "I Quit" match.

== Production ==
=== Background ===
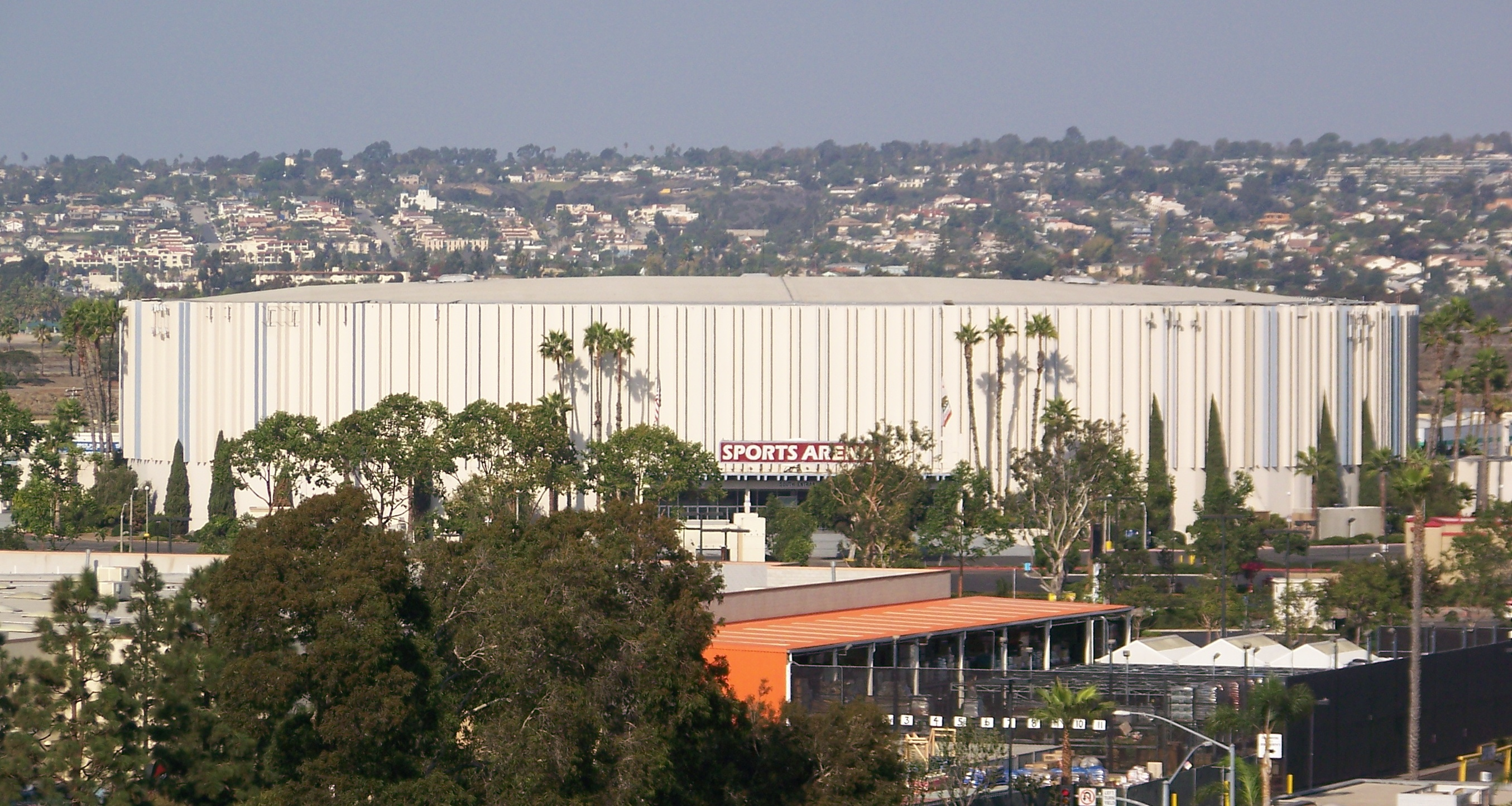
The fourth annual One Night Stand was held at the San Diego Sports Arena in San Diego, California.

One Night Stand was an annual professional wrestling pay-per-view (PPV) event produced every June by World Wrestling Entertainment (WWE) since 2005. The event was originally held as a reunion show for wrestlers from the former Extreme Championship Wrestling (ECW) promotion and featured hardcore-based matches, before WWE established a third brand dubbed ECW in 2006. The 2007 event was rebranded as a WWE show for wrestlers from Raw, SmackDown, and ECW, but continuing the hardcore theme. The fourth hardcore-themed event, also held for all three brands, was scheduled for June 1, 2008, at the San Diego Sports Arena in San Diego, California. This was the first One Night Stand PPV broadcast in high definition.

=== Storylines ===
The event included matches that resulted from scripted storylines. Results were predetermined by WWE's writers on the Raw, SmackDown, and ECW brands, while storylines were produced on WWE's weekly television shows, Raw, SmackDown, and ECW.

Stage setup for One Night Stand.

The main feud heading into One Night Stand on the Raw brand was between Triple H and Randy Orton over the WWE Championship. At Backlash, a fatal four-way elimination match took place for the WWE Championship. The contestants were Orton, Triple H, John Cena, and John "Bradshaw" Layfield (JBL). Triple H won the match after last eliminating Orton to win the WWE title. At Judgment Day, Triple H defended the WWE Championship against Orton in a Steel Cage match. Triple H won the match after a Pedigree to retain the title. On the May 19 episode of Raw, General Manager William Regal booked a tag team match between Orton and JBL against Cena and Triple H. If Orton and JBL won, they would have received re-matches against Triple H and Cena, respectively, at One Night Stand in an extreme match of their choosing. If Cena and Triple H had won, however, then the pair would have faced each other for the WWE Championship, with Regal choosing the match type. After Orton and JBL won the tag team match, Orton announced that he and Triple H would compete in a Last Man Standing match for the WWE Championship at One Night Stand. JBL announced that he and Cena would compete in a First Blood match at One Night Stand.

Another feud heading into One Night Stand was between Shawn Michaels and Batista. The feud began after Batista expressed his remorse over the retirement of Ric Flair at WrestleMania XXIV, which was caused by Michaels getting the pinfall over Flair in Flair's career threatening match. During the rivalry, a match between Batista and Michaels took place at Backlash, with Chris Jericho as the special guest referee. At the end of the match, Michaels appeared to suffer a knee injury, lowering Batista's guard until Michaels sprang up to perform Sweet Chin Music on him and defeated him by pinfall. In following weeks, Batista and Jericho remained skeptical about Michaels' injury, then Michaels admitted to Jericho that he'd staged the injury on the May 12 episode of Raw, Batista defeated Jericho on the May 19, 2008 episode of Raw to earn the right to face Michaels at One Night Stand in a Stretcher match.

The main feud on the SmackDown brand was between Edge and The Undertaker, over the vacant World Heavyweight Championship. At Backlash, The Undertaker defeated Edge to retain the World Heavyweight Championship, by making Edge submit to his submission chokehold, the Gogoplata. On the May 2 episode of SmackDown, General Manager Vickie Guerrero stripped The Undertaker of the title and banned his chokehold to "protect the SmackDown superstars". At Judgment Day, The Undertaker and Edge faced off against each other in a match again for the vacant World Heavyweight Championship. The Undertaker won the match by countout, however, Guerrero announced that as per WWE rules, championships cannot change hands, or be captured by disqualification or countout. On the May 23 episode of SmackDown, Vickie announced a Tables, Ladders, and Chairs match between Edge and The Undertaker at One Night Stand for the vacant World Heavyweight Championship, with the stipulation that if The Undertaker should lose the match, he would have to leave WWE.

The main feud heading into One Night Stand on the ECW brand was between CM Punk, Chavo Guerrero, Tommy Dreamer, John Morrison, and The Big Show. On the May 20 episode of ECW, General Manager Armando Estrada announced a Fatal Four-Way, Singapore Cane on a pole match, for One Night Stand featuring Punk, Guerrero, Dreamer, and Morrison, where the winner would receive an ECW Championship match against the ECW Champion Kane at Night of Champions. Later that night, the team of Guerrero and Morrison defeated the team of Dreamer and Punk in a tag team match. After the match, however, Big Show attacked all four superstars. Big Show then announced that he would also compete in the match at One Night Stand, making it a five-man Singapore Cane match.

The Divas feud heading into One Night Stand was between Beth Phoenix and Melina. On the May 5 episode of Raw, Phoenix was defeated by Mickie James in a lumberjill match for the WWE Women's Championship after Melina accidentally struck Phoenix with her boot. On the following week, Phoenix and Melina were defeated by James and Maria in a tag team match. During the match, Melina accidentally knocked Phoenix off the ring apron, which resulted in Phoenix abandoning Melina and allowing James and Maria to pick up the victory. After the match ended, the evil Phoenix attacked Melina in a backstage segment, ending a long-time alliance between the two and leaving Melina in the process of a face turn. Both Phoenix and Melina competed in a triple-threat match for the Women's Championship at Judgment Day that was won by James. The following night on Raw, Phoenix defeated Maria in singles action, and Melina (who was on commentary) attacked Phoenix with her boot before she was thrown to the entrance ramp by Phoenix, solidifying Melina's face turn. It was later announced that Phoenix and Melina would face each other at One Night Stand in the first-ever women's "I Quit" match.

== Event ==
Other on-screen personnel
Role:	Name:
English commentators	Jim Ross (Raw)
English commentators	Jerry Lawler (Raw)
English commentators	Michael Cole (SmackDown)
English commentators	Mick Foley (SmackDown)
English commentators	Mike Adamle (ECW)
English commentators	Tazz (ECW)
Spanish commentators	Carlos Cabrera
Spanish commentators	Hugo Savinovich
Backstage Interviewer	Todd Grisham
Ring announcers	Lilian Garcia (Raw)
Ring announcers	Tony Chimel (ECW)
Ring announcers	Justin Roberts (SmackDown)
Referees	John Cone
Referees	Mike Chioda
Referees	Charles Robinson
Referees	Chad Patton
Referees	Scott Armstrong
Referees	Marty Elias
Referees	Jack Doan
Referees	Mickie Henson
Referees	Jim Korderas

The opening match of the pay-per-view was a Falls Count Anywhere match between Jeff Hardy and Umaga. The pair fought around the arena, including in the audience stands before they made their way out to a car park. The match ended when Hardy performed a "Swanton Bomb" (a high-angle senton bomb) on Umaga from the top of a truck and pinned him for the victory.

The next match was a Singapore Cane match between Big Show, Tommy Dreamer, John Morrison, CM Punk, and Chavo Guerrero. The match started with Big Show dominating, until the other competitors teamed together to knock him out the ring. During the course of the match, Guerrero was aided by Bam Neely and Morrison's tag team partner The Miz helped Morrison. A brief spot between CM Punk and Chavo involved then NFL star Shawne Merriman being hit by a cane and returning the favor to Guerrero. After Big Show incapacitated the other wrestlers, including Neely and The Miz, he hit Dreamer with a kendo stick and pinned him, thus earning an ECW Championship match at Night of Champions.

The next match was John Cena facing John "Bradshaw" Layfield (JBL) in a First Blood match, in which the winner is the wrestler who makes his opponent bleed first. Both men utilized weapons in their attempts to win, including steel steps, the steel barricade, and chairs. The match ended Cena executed his STF submission hold on JBL while using a steel chain to draw blood.

An "I Quit" match between Melina and Beth Phoenix was aired fourth. Both women used a variety of submission moves throughout the course of the match, which Phoenix won by making Melina say "I quit". The first submission used was guillotine hold from Melina to Phoenix. Phoenix, of course, got out of it after a struggle. The match then saw Melina use a submission move that she used on Jillian Hall the week prior to the "I Quit" match. Phoenix, again, got out of the move by moving towards the edge of the ring so that her and Melina could fall off therefore breaking the submission move on The Glamazon. Another submission move we saw used was an armbreaker from Melina that she had cinched in for a few minutes on Phoenix before Phoenix was able to get her into a triangle hold and hoist Melina up before issuing a powerbomb to, once again, break Melina's submission move. It was the most defense to the Glamazon's offence that we'd seen since Phoenix had been in WWE. The next submission move was applied to Melina from Phoenix, a modified version of her Glam Slam with Melina's legs bent as Phoenix held her arms and leaned back as she pulled on them. Melina shook her head as if to say "no, I am not quitting", but after The Glamazon reapplied the submission move, this time with Melina's hands under her chin as Phoenix pulled backwards, Melina had no choice but to mutter the words "I Quit" therefore allowing Beth Phoenix to capture the win of the first ever women's "I Quit" match in WWE history.

The first main event match of the event was a Stretcher match contested between Shawn Michaels and Batista. The match ended with Batista rolling Michaels across the finish line on the stretcher.

The following match was a Last Man Standing match for the WWE Championship between Triple H and Randy Orton, in which the objective is to ensure the opponent cannot answer a ten count. Orton took control of the match by using the steel ring steps and then tried to execute the RKO on Triple H; Triple H countered by pushing him over the top rope. Orton legitimately broke his collarbone landing on the outside, and after being hit by Triple H with a sledgehammer, could not answer the ten count, allowing Triple H to retain the WWE Championship.

The main event was The Undertaker versus Edge in a Tables, Ladders, and Chairs match for the vacant World Heavyweight Championship. Throughout the match, all members of La Familia got involved, attacking The Undertaker and preventing him from climbing the ladder. The Undertaker put both Curt Hawkins and Zack Ryder through tables on the outside, before executing a Last Ride on Edge off the ladder and through two tables. The Undertaker failed to capitalise as Chavo Guerrero and Bam Neely interfered, prompting The Undertaker to hit them both with steel chairs. He again climbed the ladder, but Edge had recovered and pushed the ladder over, sending The Undertaker through four tables on the outside of the ring. Edge then climbed the ladder and retrieved the championship, winning the match and forcing The Undertaker to leave WWE, as per the pre-match stipulation.

== Aftermath ==
The feud with Edge and The Undertaker continued to SummerSlam. After Edge banished The Undertaker from WWE, CM Punk cashed in his Money in the Bank contract on the June 30 episode of Raw, and defeated Edge for the World Heavyweight Championship. During the wedding of Edge and Vickie Guerrero on the July 18 episode of SmackDown, Triple H came and showed a video with Edge cheating on Vickie with Alicia Fox. Vickie became angry and started to hit Edge. After Edge failed to win the WWE Championship from Triple H at The Great American Bash, Vickie Guerrero revealed that she had reinstated The Undertaker and booked a Hell in a Cell match between Edge and The Undertaker at SummerSlam. At SummerSlam, The Undertaker defeated Edge and after the match, The Undertaker chokeslamed Edge through the wrestling ring with fire coming out of it soon after.

Big Show would challenge Kane for the ECW Championship at the Night of Champions pay-per-view, he would soon run into Mark Henry who also challenged for the title. At Night of Champions, Mark Henry defeated Big Show and Kane in a triple threat match for the ECW Championship.

After Randy Orton broke his collar bone, Triple H defended his WWE Championship at Night of Champions by defeating John Cena. On the June 23 episode of Raw, Triple H was drafted to SmackDown and started a feud with Edge. He later defeated Edge at The Great American Bash to retain the WWE Championship. After defending the title against The Great Khali at SummerSlam and Jeff Hardy twice at No Mercy and Cyber Sunday, Triple H finally lost it to Edge at Survivor Series in a Triple Threat Match involving Vladimir Kozlov. One month later, at Armageddon, Edge defended the championship in a Triple Threat match, which was won by Jeff Hardy.

The 2008 One Night Stand was the final event promoted as One Night Stand, as it was replaced by Extreme Rules in 2009. One Night Stand was originally just renamed to Extreme Rules for 2009, but in 2010, WWE declared that Extreme Rules was its own chronology, one that was no longer part of the One Night Stand chronology. Extreme Rules, however, adopted One Night Stand's theme of featuring various hardcore-based matches.

== Results ==
No.	Results	Stipulations	Times
1^{D}	Matt Hardy defeated Shelton Benjamin by pinfall	Singles match	—
2	Jeff Hardy defeated Umaga by pinfall	Falls Count Anywhere match	09:27
3	Big Show defeated Chavo Guerrero, CM Punk, John Morrison, and Tommy Dreamer	Singapore Cane match to determine the #1 contender for the ECW Championship at Night of Champions	08:35
4	John Cena defeated John "Bradshaw" Layfield	First Blood match	14:30
5	Beth Phoenix defeated Melina	"I Quit" match	09:14
6	Batista defeated Shawn Michaels	Stretcher match	17:03
7	Triple H (c) defeated Randy Orton	Last Man Standing match for the WWE Championship	13:15
8	Edge defeated The Undertaker	Tables, Ladders, and Chairs match for the vacant World Heavyweight Championship; Since The Undertaker lost, he was forced to leave WWE.	23:50
(c) / – the champion(s) heading into the match; D / – this was a dark match
