= The Great American Bash (2008) =

World Wrestling Entertainment pay-per-view event

- Promotional poster featuring CM Punk, Triple H, John Cena, Batista, and Shawn Michaels
- Promotion: World Wrestling Entertainment
- Brand(s): Raw; SmackDown; ECW
- Date: July 20, 2008
- City: Uniondale, New York
- Venue: Nassau Veterans Memorial Coliseum
- Attendance: 12,454
- Buy rate: 196,000

Pay-per-view chronology
← Previous; Night of Champions	Next → SummerSlam

The Great American Bash chronology
← Previous; 2007	Next → The Bash

The 2008 Great American Bash was a professional wrestling pay-per-view (PPV) event produced by World Wrestling Entertainment (WWE). It was WWE's fifth annual Great American Bash and 19th overall. The event took place on July 20, 2008, at the Nassau Veterans Memorial Coliseum in Uniondale, New York and was held for wrestlers from the promotion's Raw, SmackDown, and ECW brand divisions.

This was the final Great American Bash PPV to be held under the full name of "The Great American Bash", as in 2009, the event's title was truncated to The Bash. The full "The Great American Bash" name would not be used again until a special episode of SmackDown in 2012. This was also the final PPV of the Ruthless Aggression Era, as WWE programming became PG two days after the event. As such, it was the final WWE PPV to have a TV Parental Guidelines rating of TV-14 until The Horror Show at Extreme Rules in 2020.

The main match on the SmackDown brand was between Triple H and Edge for the WWE Championship. Triple H won the match and retained the WWE Championship after pinning Edge following a Pedigree. The primary match on the Raw brand was between CM Punk and Batista for the World Heavyweight Championship, which ended in a double disqualification following interference from Kane. The predominant match on the ECW brand was between Mark Henry and Tommy Dreamer for the ECW Championship, which Henry won by pinfall due to the interference and heel turn of Colin Delaney, with Henry proceeding to perform a World's Strongest Slam to retain the championship. The featured matches on the undercard included John Cena versus John "Bradshaw" Layfield (JBL) in a New York City Parking Lot Brawl and Shawn Michaels versus Chris Jericho. The event also saw Michelle McCool defeat Natalya to win the inaugural WWE Divas Championship, which was established for SmackDown, opposite of Raw's WWE Women's Championship.

== Production ==
=== Background ===
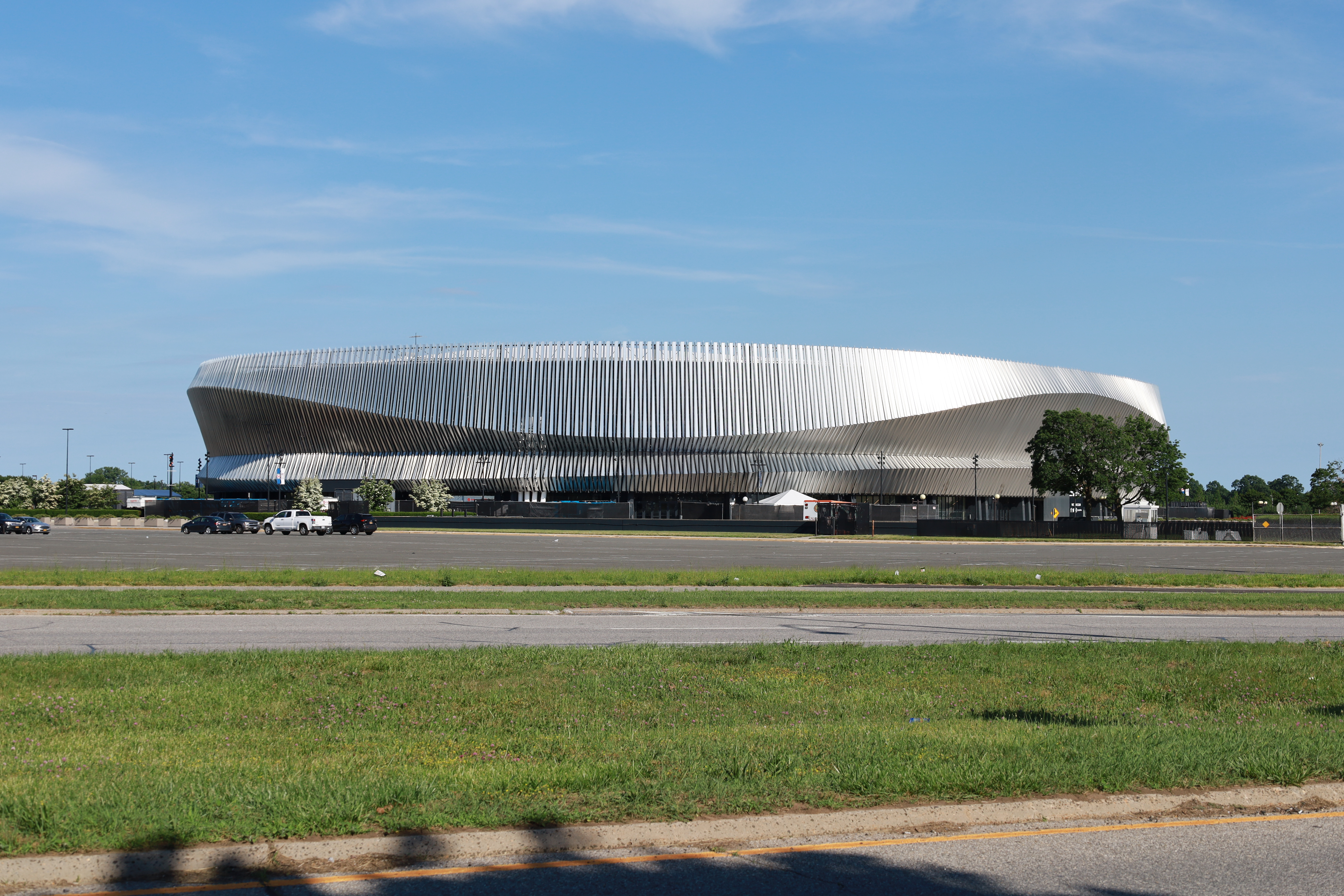
WWE's fifth annual Great American Bash was held at the Nassau Veterans Memorial Coliseum in Uniondale, New York.

The Great American Bash is a professional wrestling event established in 1985, held during the summer. Following World Wrestling Entertainment's (WWE) acquisition of World Championship Wrestling (WCW) in March 2001, WWE revived The Great American Bash as its own annual pay-per-view (PPV) event in 2004. WWE's fifth annual Great American Bash, and 19th overall, took place on July 20, 2008, at the Nassau Veterans Memorial Coliseum in Uniondale, New York and featured wrestlers from the Raw, SmackDown, and ECW brands. This was the first Great American Bash PPV broadcast in high definition and it was sponsored by AT&T.

=== Storylines ===
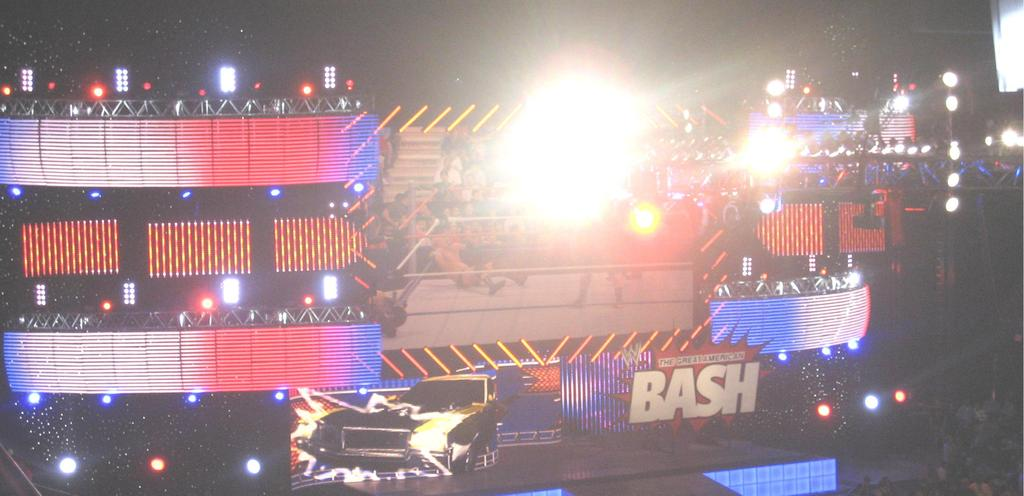
The stage setup for The Great American Bash.

The main feud heading into The Great American Bash on the SmackDown brand was between Triple H and Edge, with the two feuding over the WWE Championship. On the July 4 episode of SmackDown, SmackDown General Manager Vickie Guerrero announced that Triple H would defend the WWE Championship at The Great American Bash against Edge. This prompted Edge to take his frustrations out on Vickie due to the fact that he lost the World title (that he had won at One Night Stand in a Tables, Ladders, and Chairs match) to CM Punk several days earlier on Raw and told her the wedding was off. The following week, however, after Guerrero saved Edge from a con-chair-to by The Big Show, Edge re-proposed, and the wedding was back on. On the July 18 episode of SmackDown, Edge and Vickie Guerrero held their kayfabe wedding reception. At the end of the reception as Guerrero and Edge were in the ring, Triple H appeared to reveal Edge's secret love affair with Edge and Guerrero's wedding planner, Alicia Fox.

The primary feud going into The Great American Bash on the Raw brand was between CM Punk and Batista, with the two feuding over the World Heavyweight Championship. On the June 23 episode of Raw, CM Punk and Batista were drafted to Raw, while WWE Champion Triple H was drafted to SmackDown. At Night of Champions, it was determined that either Batista or John Cena would bring a World Championship to the Raw brand. During that event, Batista was unsuccessful at winning the World title from Edge while John Cena failed to defeat Triple H for the WWE title in a WrestleMania 22 rematch. On the following night on Raw, CM Punk cashed in his Money in the Bank contract that he won at WrestleMania XXIV and defeated Edge to capture the title, after Batista delivered a beating to Edge. Later on that night, Punk defeated John "Bradshaw" Layfield (JBL) to retain the World Championship with the help from John Cena and Cryme Tyme. On July 7, on Raw, CM Punk defeated Snitsky in a non-title match. Later that night, Batista became the number one contender for the World Heavyweight Championship after defeating Kane, JBL, and John Cena in a fatal four-way match. The following week, Punk defeated Kane by countout in a non-title match. After the match, Kane attempted to attack Punk, but Batista ran to the ring and attacked Kane with a steel chair. Punk offered Batista a handshake, but Batista declined and instead delivered a spinebuster to Punk.

The predominant feud on the ECW brand was between Mark Henry and Tommy Dreamer. On the July 1 episode of ECW, Henry faced Colin Delaney in a match where if Delaney had won, Dreamer would receive a title shot against Henry. Henry won the match, and Dreamer was not granted a title match. The following week on ECW Henry faced Dreamer in a non-title match. The match ended in a no-contest after Henry escaped the ring to try to attack Delaney, who was at ringside with Dreamer. Tony Atlas was the special guest ring announcer for this match, and stepped in to save Delaney from Henry's attack. Instead, Atlas turned heel, and allowed Henry to attack Delaney. Henry then returned to the ring to attack Dreamer, as the match was ruled a no-contest.

== Event ==
Other on-screen personnel
Role:	Name:
English commentators	Michael Cole (Raw)
English commentators	Jerry Lawler (Raw)
English commentators	Jim Ross (SmackDown)
English commentators	Mick Foley (SmackDown)
English commentators	Mike Adamle (ECW)
English commentators	Tazz (ECW)
Spanish commentators	Carlos Cabrera
Spanish commentators	Hugo Savinovich
Backstage interviewer	Eve Torres
Ring announcers	Lilian Garcia (Raw)
Ring announcers	Justin Roberts (SmackDown)
Ring announcers	Tony Chimel (ECW)
Referees	John Cone
Referees	Mike Chioda
Referees	Marty Elias
Referees	Charles Robinson
Referees	Mickie Henson
Referees	Scott Armstrong
Referees	Mike Posey
Referees	Jim Korderas

The first match was a fatal four-way tag team match for the WWE Tag Team Championship in which John Morrison and The Miz defended the titles against Curt Hawkins and Zack Ryder, Jesse and Festus and Finlay and Hornswoggle. As the bell rang, Festus cleared the ring until The Miz and Morrison tossed Hornswoggle in the ring. The Miz and Morrison then jumped onto the ring apron, but Festus knocked them off. Hornswoggle dove out of the ring through the top and middle ropes to land on top of The Miz and Morrison. Throughout the match, the eight wrestlers would attempt to make physical contact with their respective partners to get themselves tagged into the match. Hawkins and Ryder won the titles after throwing Jesse off of the top rope and pinning him.

The next match was for the WWE United States Championship, with Matt Hardy defending against Shelton Benjamin. Benjamin executed the Paydirt on Hardy after a reversal of Hardy’s Moonsault and pinned Hardy to win the United States Championship.

The next match was for the ECW Championship, with Mark Henry defending against Tommy Dreamer. Dreamer was on the turnbuckle about to finish Henry off but Colin Delaney turned on him and pulled him into the top rope. Henry then executed the World's Strongest Slam to get the win.

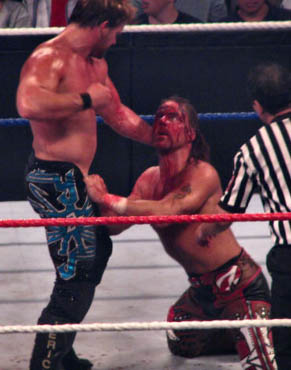
Chris Jericho attacking Shawn Michaels' damaged eye during their match.

The next match was a singles match between Shawn Michaels and Chris Jericho. The match started and already Michaels suffered (kayfabe) cracked ribs and internal bleeding. During the match Jericho executed an elbow to Michaels' right eye. Michaels was bleeding for the remainder of the match. Lance Cade also interfered and executed many cheap shots on Michaels while the referee's back was turned. After Jericho executed many shots on Michaels' face the referee deemed Michaels unable to continue, therefore Jericho was declared the winner.

The next match to determine the inaugural WWE Divas Champion between Michelle McCool and Natalya. McCool forced Natalya to submit with a Heel Hook. After the match, Eve Torres and Cherry joined McCool in the ring to celebrate.

The next match was for the World Heavyweight Championship between CM Punk and Batista. Each man continually built momentum on different occasions. Batista managed to execute a Spinebuster on Punk outside of the ring. As Batista pushed Punk back into the ring Kane interfered by attacking both Batista and Punk which ended the match in a double disqualification. After the match, Batista executed a Batista Bomb on Punk.

The next match was a New York City Parking Lot Brawl between John Cena and John "Bradshaw" Layfield (JBL). They both performed extreme moves including Cena using JBL's body to smash a car door off its hinges. In a planned spot, JBL set fire to a car with Cena inside. Cena destroyed a car with JBL in it with a forklift. Cena was about to execute the FU but JBL countered and pushed Cena into a window, which cut Cena's arm, allowing JBL to pin Cena to win the match.

The main event was for the WWE Championship between Triple H and Edge. Both men were dominating at different times of the match. Near the end, Alicia Fox tried to give Edge the WWE Championship belt to use it as a weapon. Vickie Guerrero started brawling with Fox, however, and Edge accidentally speared Guerrero in an attempt to hit the referee to delay the match. The distraction allowed Triple H to execute a Pedigree, retaining the WWE Championship.

== Aftermath ==
=== Raw ===
After Chris Jericho beat Shawn Michaels in a singles match, Michaels came to the ring on August 17 at SummerSlam to announce his storyline retirement. Jericho, however, interrupted the announcement and, in an attempt to punch Michaels, accidentally struck Michaels' wife Rebecca. On the following night on Raw, Jericho stated that he had no remorse for what he did to Michaels wife, claiming that Michaels "had it coming to him". The following week on Raw, Michaels announced that he was not going to retire and asked Jericho for an unsanctioned match at Unforgiven. Jericho agreed to the match and the following week on Raw there was a contract signing for the match. The signing ended with Jericho and Michaels attacking each other. During the match at Unforgiven, Michaels' persistent assault on Jericho would lead to Jericho obtaining a legitimate bruised and swollen jaw.

Following The Great American Bash, John Cena and JBL ended their feud, as did Batista and CM Punk (after a rematch the next night on Raw, which ended in no contest, thus Punk retained the title). On the July 28 episode of Raw, John Cena and Batista defeated JBL and Kane in a tag team match. After the match, on-screen authority figure, Mike Adamle announced that at SummerSlam, Batista would face John Cena in a standard match. On the following episode of Raw, Cena and Batista defeated Cody Rhodes and Ted DiBiase to capture the World Tag Team Championship. On the August 11 episode of Raw, Cena and Batista lost the tag team championship to Rhodes and DiBiase in a tag team rematch.

On the August 4 episode of Raw, Adamle announced that JBL and Chris Jericho would face CM Punk in a two-on-one match that night, where whoever pinned Punk (if anyone) would face Punk for the World Heavyweight Championship at SummerSlam. JBL won the match for his team after he pinned Punk, setting up the match between himself and Punk for SummerSlam.

=== SmackDown ===
On the July 25 episode of SmackDown, Edge apologized to Vickie Guerrero for his actions at The Great American Bash. Guerrero accepted the apology, but informed Edge that she had already re-instated The Undertaker, who had been fired as a part of the storyline between himself and Edge. Guerrero announced that at the upcoming pay-per-view event, SummerSlam, Edge would face The Undertaker in a Hell in a Cell match. On SmackDown the following week, Mick Foley gave Edge a stern taking about what he needed to do to win Hell in a Cell against The Undertaker. After recalling his own words from the past, describing Edge as the "Greatest Superstar in the WWE", Foley warned that if the new Edge – the "white-tuxedo-wearing" and "luffa-sponge bathing Edge" – walked into Hell in a Cell, The Undertaker would tear him apart. After Foley's cutting words, Edge claimed to understand the advice but suddenly attacked Foley, leading to a melee culminating in Edge leaping from atop of the ladder and smashing Foley through a table. At SummerSlam, The Undertaker defeated Edge after performing a Tombstone Piledriver. Following SummerSlam, Edge was out of action. The Undertaker began to feud with Guerrero and Big Show at the next pay-per-view event, Unforgiven, when Big Show attacked The Undertaker to save Guerrero from being attacked.

=== Future ===
The 2008 Great American Bash was the last WWE pay-per-view event of the Ruthless Aggression Era and also the last to have a TV Parental Guidelines rating of TV-14. Two days after the event, WWE's programming went PG. The 2008 event was also the last PPV to be titled as "The Great American Bash", as in 2009, the event was renamed as The Bash. "The Great American Bash" name would not be used again until a special episode of SmackDown in July 2012. Since 2020, the event has been held as an annual event for NXT.

== Results ==
No.	Results	Stipulations	Times
1^{D}	Umaga defeated Mr. Kennedy	Singles match	4:00
2	Curt Hawkins and Zack Ryder defeated John Morrison and The Miz (c), Jesse and Festus, and Finlay and Hornswoggle by pinfall	Fatal four-way match for the WWE Tag Team Championship	9:05
3	Shelton Benjamin defeated Matt Hardy (c) by pinfall	Singles match for the WWE United States Championship	9:33
4	Mark Henry (c) (with Tony Atlas) defeated Tommy Dreamer (with Colin Delaney) by pinfall	Singles match for the ECW Championship	5:29
5	Chris Jericho defeated Shawn Michaels by technical knockout	Singles match	18:18
6	Michelle McCool defeated Natalya by submission	Singles match for the inaugural WWE Divas Championship	4:14
7	CM Punk (c) vs. Batista ended in a double disqualification	Singles match for the World Heavyweight Championship	11:10
8	John "Bradshaw" Layfield defeated John Cena by pinfall	New York City Parking Lot Brawl	14:36
9	Triple H (c) defeated Edge by pinfall	Singles match for the WWE Championship	16:48
(c) / – the champion(s) heading into the match; D / – this was a dark match
