= Vickie Guerrero =

American professional wrestling manager (born 1968)

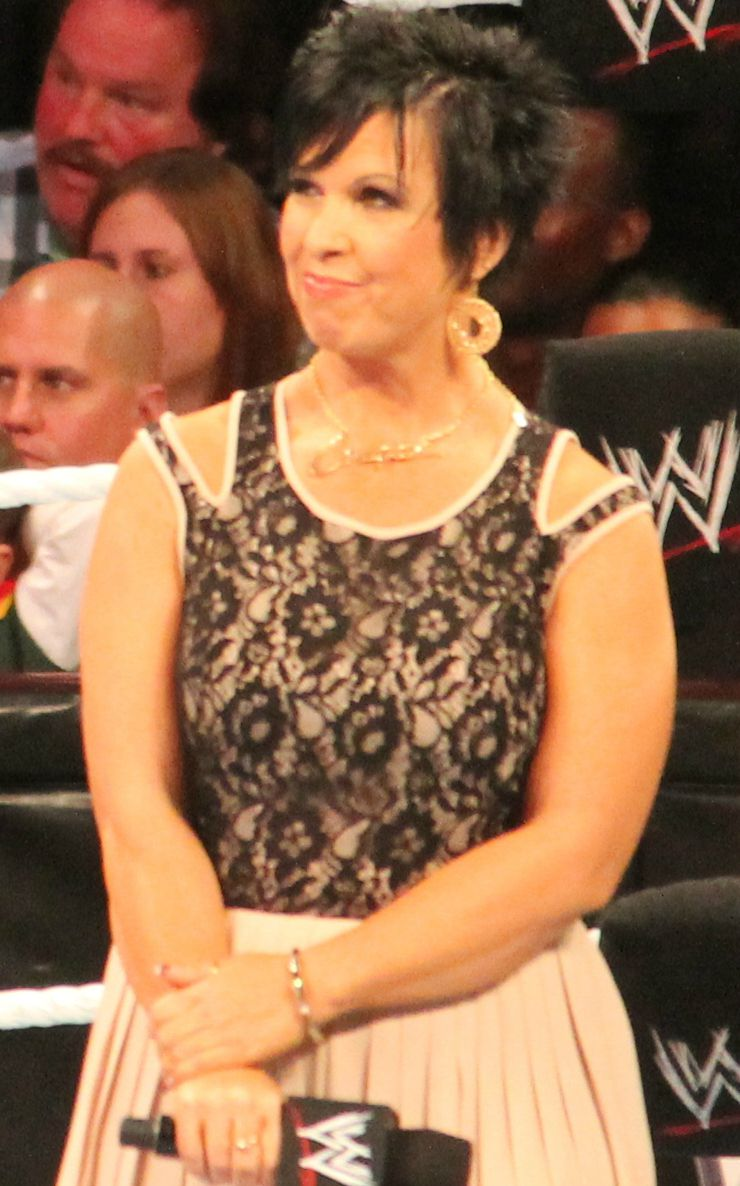
- Benson in 2013

Personal information
- Born: Vickie Lynn Lara; April 16, 1968 (age 58) El Paso, Texas, U.S.
- Education: Herzing University (BS); University of Texas at El Paso
- Spouses: Eddie Guerrero (m. 1990; died 2005); Kris Benson (m. 2015)
- Children: 2, including Shaul Guerrero
- Family: Guerrero
- Website: travelbyvickie.com

Professional wrestling career
- Ring name: Vickie Guerrero
- Billed height: 5 ft 4 in (163 cm)
- Billed weight: 141 lb (64 kg)
- Billed from: El Paso, Texas
- Trained by: Eddie Guerrero; Chavo Guerrero Jr.
- Debut: July 14, 2005

Twitch information
- Channel: excusemevg
- Years active: 2020–present
- Genres: Gaming; Lifestyle
- Followers: 2,600
- Last updated: August 20, 2026

Vickie Lynn Benson (formerly Guerrero, née Lara; born April 16, 1968), better known as Vickie Guerrero, is an American professional wrestler, professional wrestling personality, and manager. She is signed to WWE as an ambassador. She is also known for her tenure in All Elite Wrestling (AEW).

In wrestling, she has appeared as an on-screen authority figure, storyline lover to several WWE wrestlers, professional wrestler in the WWE Divas division, and as a manager for numerous wrestlers. She was best known in her role as general manager of SmackDown from 2007 to 2011, and of Raw from 2011 to 2013. Since leaving WWE in 2014, she has made sporadic appearances in the company.

She is known for her villainous persona and igniting negative reactions from audiences with her catchphrase, "Excuse me!". She is the widow of professional wrestler Eddie Guerrero, which has been occasionally incorporated into WWE storylines.

== Professional wrestling career ==
=== World Wrestling Entertainment/WWE (2005–2018) ===
==== Storyline with Eddie and Chavo (2005–2006) ====
In 2005, Vickie Guerrero made her debut as a face with her husband Eddie Guerrero and Rey Mysterio, when a storyline escalated in which Eddie promised to reveal a secret concerning Mysterio's son, Dominik. Vickie was on the July 14 episode of SmackDown! with two of Eddie's three daughters to stop Eddie from revealing Mysterio's secret. Eddie promised not to reveal the secret, if he lost to Mysterio at The Great American Bash, though that turned out to be another one of his character's trademark lies, as Eddie revealed that Dominik was really his (kayfabe) biological son. Vickie later reappeared at SummerSlam to convince Eddie to put a stop to his war with Mysterio and not to go through with the "Custody of Dominik" ladder match that night. When that failed, she cost him the match by pushing over the ladder he was on as he was about to win. After doing so, she held Eddie down on the ground so he couldn't get up and stop Mysterio from climbing the ladder. On November 13, 2005, Eddie Guerrero died of heart failure in his Minneapolis hotel room and was found by his nephew Chavo. On-screen, this led to Rey Mysterio, Eddie's real-life friend, getting more screen time and higher profile matches, including defeating Kurt Angle and Randy Orton at WrestleMania 22 for the World Heavyweight Championship. The night before WrestleMania, Eddie was posthumously inducted into the WWE Hall of Fame, and Vickie accepted the honor on his behalf.

In 2006, approximately seven or eight months after Eddie's death, Vickie started appearing more prominently in more controversial storylines. She first asserted herself during a feud between Mysterio and Chavo Guerrero when Chavo accused Mysterio of being "nothing but a leech living off the blood of the Guerrero name" on the August 4 SmackDown!. Subsequently, she acted as peacemaker between the two former friends until she seemingly inadvertently interfered in their match at SummerSlam in 2006, costing Mysterio the match. Vickie later openly sided with Chavo and hit Mysterio in the back with a chair on the following SmackDown!, turning heel in the process. On the September 1 SmackDown!, Vickie declared herself Chavo's business manager and Mysterio an "insignificant chapter" in her past. At No Mercy, Chavo lost to Mysterio in a Falls Count Anywhere match. On October 20, Rey Mysterio lost an "I Quit" match against Chavo after interference from Vickie.

On October 27, 2006, Chris Benoit became involved in the storyline. He tried to figure out what Vickie was doing with Eddie's estate while also defending the WWE United States Championship in a rivalry with Chavo. At Survivor Series, Chavo kicked out of an attempted sharpshooter, causing Benoit to knock Vickie off the ring apron and on her head, causing her to begin to wear a neck brace and blame Benoit for "intentionally" hitting her. At the end of December, she interfered in a United States Championship match between Chavo and Benoit, which caused Chavo to lose and Benoit to retain the title. As a result, Chavo shouted "If you wanted me to win the title, then stop getting me disqualified," before pushing Vickie over.

==== Relationship with Edge; La Familia (2007–2009) ====
In May 2007, Guerrero began to appear on television, first as Theodore Long's assistant and later, the General Manager of SmackDown. During her work as General Manager, she had a storyline where she had a romantic relationship with Edge, giving him chances for the World Heavyweight Championship.

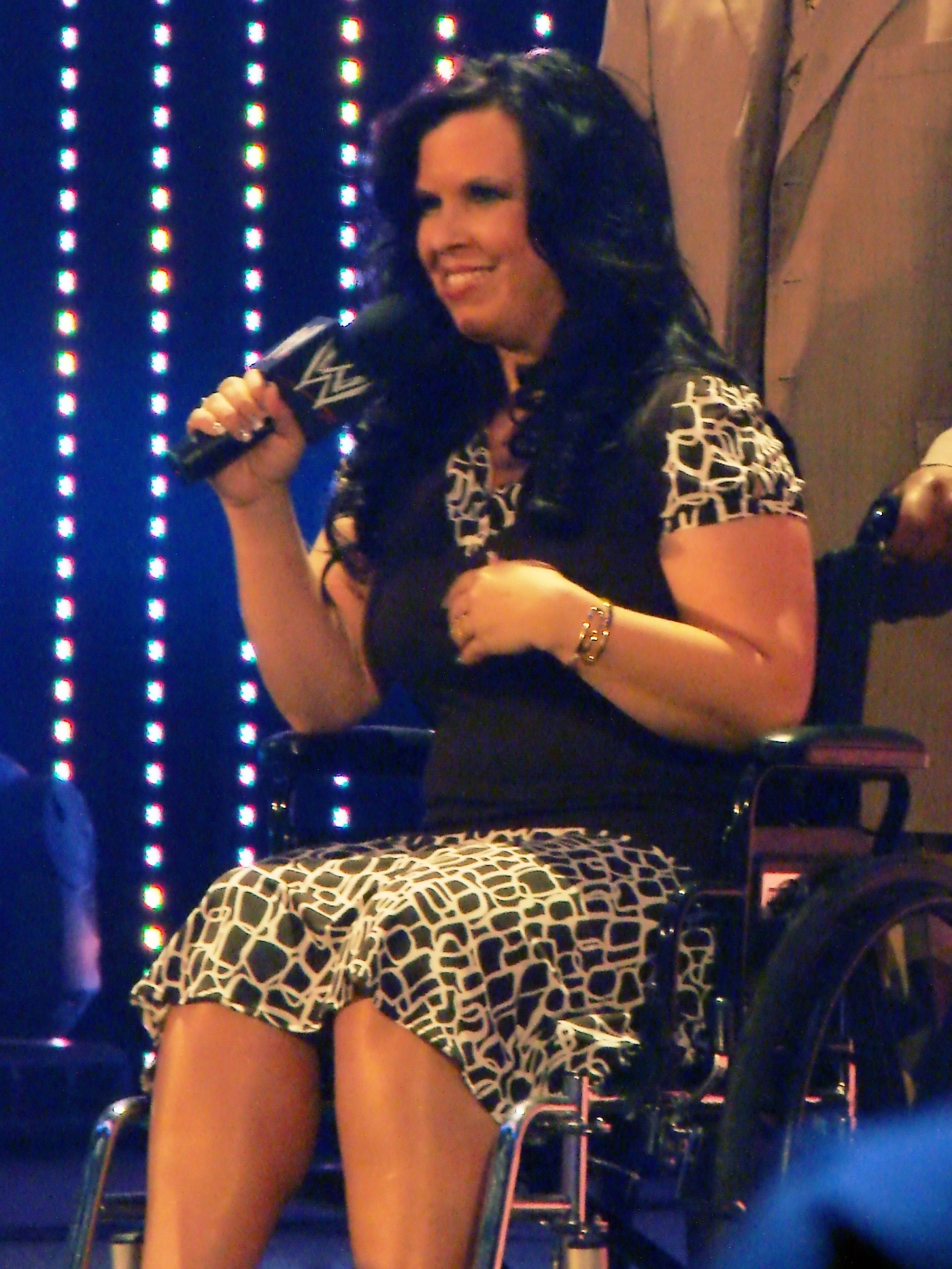
As part of the "La Familia" storyline, Guerrero began appearing on a wheelchair, as seen here during a SmackDown event in 2008

In early 2008, she formed 'La Familia', a stable including; Chavo, Edge, Curt Hawkins, Zack Ryder,and later Bam Neely. One of her first acts as part of the new group was to help Chavo win the ECW Championship from CM Punk. After Edge lost the title to The Undertaker at WrestleMania XXIV, she gave Edge numerous title opportunities and placing The Undertaker in difficult matches. On the May 2 episode of SmackDown, she stripped The Undertaker of his championship after deciding that his new gogoplata (dubbed Hell's Gate) submission hold was too dangerous and made a Tables, ladders, and chairs match at One Night Stand between The Undertaker and Edge for the vacant title with the stipulation that Undertaker would be banished from WWE if he lost. Following interference, Edge won the match and the World Heavyweight Championship and Vickie 'banished' Undertaker.

On the July 18 episode of SmackDown, during a segment where Edge and Vickie hosted a wedding reception, Triple H came out and showed a video of Edge cheating on Vickie the day before with Alicia Fox, the wedding planner. The storyline continued at The Great American Bash, where Triple H retained the title after Edge performed the Spear on Guerrero. Triple H used this distraction to recover and hit a Pedigree to retain his title. Guerrero announced a match between Edge and The Undertaker at SummerSlam in a Hell in a Cell match. The Undertaker refused to accept her apology for his banishment, but Vickie stated that she was not afraid of him. She also stated that at Unforgiven, she would force him to apologize to her, but at Unforgiven when The Undertaker did not comply, the Big Show knocked him out and Vickie spat in his face, turning heel once again. Big Show then aligned himself with Vickie, and for the next two weeks they continued to gloat at how they beat The Undertaker. After Undertaker attacked Chavo, Vickie pleaded with Undertaker for forgiveness for her actions. Undertaker, however, once again hit her with a Tombstone Piledriver, forcing Vickie to rely on both a neckbrace and a wheelchair again. Over the following weeks, Vickie put the Undertaker in matches against the Big Show that seemed impossible for him to win. The feud ended after Big Show lost to Undertaker in a casket match at Survivor Series.

On February 23, 2009, she was appointed the interim general manager of Raw during Stephanie McMahon's absence. On the following Raw, Guerrero announced that Edge would be facing Big Show for his World Heavyweight Championship at WrestleMania 25. On the March 9 episode of Raw, John Cena showed footage of Vickie cheating on Edge with Big Show after Guerrero had added Cena to the World Heavyweight Title match through blackmail of revealing the secret affair, making it a triple threat in the process. At WrestleMania, Edge lost the World Heavyweight Championship to Cena after Cena pinned Big Show after Cena delivered the Attitude Adjustment to Edge onto the Big Show. On the April 6 episode of Raw, Guerrero was given the choice of either being general manager of Raw or SmackDown. She then announced that she would move to Raw in order to become its new general manager, subsequently resulting in her being separated from Edge. However, Big Show and her nephew Chavo were also moved to Raw during the 2009 WWE Draft and Supplemental Draft, respectively.

After being insulted for a few weeks because of her weight by Santino Marella, Vickie, with help from William Regal, won the "Miss WrestleMania" crown from Santina Marella, Santino's "twin sister", in a No Disqualification match sanctioned by Chavo on the May 18 episode of Raw. On June 7 at the Extreme Rules pay-per-view, Vickie lost the "Miss WrestleMania" crown to Santina in a hog pen match with Chavo by her side. The following night on Raw, Vickie announced her resignation as Raw's general manager. After her announcement, Edge came out and told Vickie that he was sorry for saying disrespectful things about her, only to reveal that he only married her so she could help him in World Championship matches, and now that she quit, she was useless to him in his endeavors to become the champion again. He then told Vickie that he wanted a divorce, leading to her suffering from a nervous breakdown. In reality, Vickie had requested to leave WWE so that she could spend more time with her family.

==== Managing and teaming with LayCool (2009–2010) ====
Guerrero returned to WWE on the SmackDown 10th Anniversary special episode on October 2, with a drastically changed new look, where she introduced her storyline boyfriend, then-heel, Eric Escobar, who she would be managing on the SmackDown brand. On the November 20 SmackDown, Guerrero was named as a SmackDown consultant by WWE Chairman Vince McMahon. The following week after Escobar failed to capture the Intercontinental title from John Morrison, Vickie ended their relationship. Escobar claimed that he could not take it any longer, saying he only went out with her for power, mirroring what Edge admitted as to why he had married Vickie on the June 8 episode of Raw. Guerrero then put him in a handicap match with The Hart Dynasty the following week, and the week after put him in another handicap match against Chris Jericho and Big Show. The storyline was soon dropped when Escobar was released by WWE.

Guerrero began involving herself in the already heated rivalry between WWE Women's Champion Mickie James and Michelle McCool and Layla, taking the sides of Team LayCool after Mickie accidentally doused her with cottage cheese on the February 12 episode of SmackDown. On the February 26 SmackDown, Guerrero acted as special guest referee for a title match between James and McCool, ultimately costing James the title after slapping her. Two weeks later she got involved in a match between WWE Women's Champion Michelle McCool and Tiffany causing Tiffany to win the match by DQ. After the match, McCool and Layla began to beat down Tiffany until Beth Phoenix made the save, in the process delivering a clothesline to Vickie. Two weeks later Guerrero appeared in a 5-on-1 handicap match with Alicia Fox, Maryse and Team LayCool against Beth Phoenix. Guerrero mainly hid behind Alicia Fox, Maryse, and Team LayCool, letting her partners do the dirty work until Phoenix was weakened and Guerrero made the pin, winning the match. At WrestleMania XXVI, Guerrero's team won a 10-woman tag team match when she climbed the turnbuckle and gestured to the sky before connecting a frog splash, as tribute to her late husband, Eddie. On the May 10 episode of Raw, Guerrero was named the permanent general manager of the Raw brand for the second time, but then resigned on the same night after being intimidated by Randy Orton. Although not the general manager, she returned to SmackDown as the Consultant on the May 14 episode and forced Phoenix to face Team LayCool in a handicap match, which Layla won to achieve her first WWE Women's Championship.

==== Managing Dolph Ziggler (2010–2012) ====
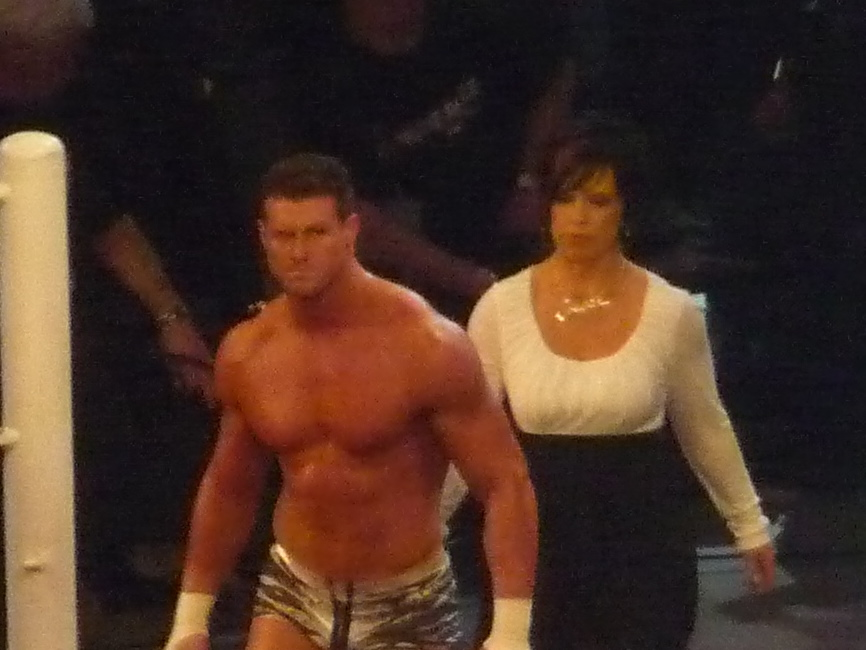
Guerrero accompanying Dolph Ziggler to the ring in April 2011

In June she began a romance storyline with Dolph Ziggler and began accompanying him to the ring. On the August 31 episode of NXT, it was announced that Vickie would be the storyline mentor of Aloisia for the all-female third season. However, due to certain circumstances, Aloisia was sent to Florida Championship Wrestling, WWE's developmental system and was later released. Vickie was assigned a new rookie on the show, Kaitlyn, whom she began feuding with. On October 5, she was defeated by Kaitlyn in a rookie versus pro match. Kaitlyn was caught backstage kissing Vickie's boyfriend, Ziggler, which added more fuel to the fire. Kaitlyn went on to win NXT and later joined SmackDown.

In January 2011, she became the acting general manager of SmackDown after Theodore Long was found unconscious backstage. At the Royal Rumble pay-per-view, Kelly Kelly attacked Guerrero during Ziggler's match with Edge. On the February 4 episode of SmackDown, Ziggler and LayCool lost to Edge and Kelly in a two-on-three handicapped mix tag match for the World Heavyweight Championship. Afterwards, Guerrero fired Kelly, and announced a championship match between Edge and Ziggler, with her serving as the special guest referee of the match. The following week, while officiating the match, she attempted to spear Edge but injured her ankle as part of the storyline. While she was down, Clay Matthews of the Green Bay Packers replaced her as referee, and Edge went on to win the match. On SmackDown's 600th episode the following week, she stripped Edge of the title and fired him in the storyline. Later that night, there was a coronation for Ziggler as World Heavyweight Champion. However, the returning Theodore Long revealed that he was once again in charge and that Vickie and Ziggler were the culprits behind his assault, thus making an impromptu match between Ziggler and a reinstated Edge for the World Heavyweight Championship, in which Edge won. After the match, Long fired Ziggler. On the February 25 episode of SmackDown, Long announced that a match would take place with Edge and Kelly Kelly facing Vickie and Drew McIntyre. Vickie lost the match, and was then fired (kayfabe) from her consultant role by Long.

On the March 7 episode of Raw, Guerrero and Ziggler made their return to the brand, with Vickie managing him in a singles match defeating John Morrison. After the match, the anonymous Raw General Manager informed Vickie that Ziggler had indeed been hired, but they did not hire her yet. The general manager then continued by issuing a match between her and Trish Stratus for the following week, with the stipulation being if Vickie wins, she would be hired. The following week, Vickie defeated Trish in a No Disqualification match with the help of Team LayCool. Afterwards, Guerrero challenged Stratus, Morrison, and that week's Raw guest star Snooki, who had slapped Guerrero earlier in the night, to a six-person mixed tag team match against LayCool and Ziggler at WrestleMania XXVII, which they accepted. On the March 21 episode of Raw, Guerrero, LayCool, and Ziggler lost to Stratus and Morrison in a 4-on-2 handicap match. At WrestleMania XXVII, Vickie's team of LayCool and Ziggler were defeated by Snooki, Stratus, and Morrison. The night after WrestleMania, on Raw, Vickie and Ziggler were defeated by Stratus and Morrison.

At the Capitol Punishment pay-per-view, Ziggler won the United States Championship from Kofi Kingston, with the help of Guerrero. The next night on Raw, Ziggler retained the championship from Kingston by disqualification. Later that night, Vickie lost a dance contest to Michael Cole, despite Cole receiving the most boos. On the September 12 Raw, Vickie lost to the Divas Champion, Kelly Kelly, due to Ziggler fighting with Jack Swagger. On the September 19 Raw after weeks of pursuing for Vickie's services, Jack Swagger convinced Vickie to sign a managerial contract. At Tables, Ladders & Chairs, Ziggler lost the United States Championship to Zack Ryder, who lost the title to Swagger on the January 16, 2012, episode of Raw. On the March 5 Raw, Swagger lost the United States Championship to Santino Marella. On the June 18 episode of Raw, Vickie ended her clientele service with Jack Swagger and renewed her romantic relationship with Ziggler.

==== Final storylines and departure (2012–2014) ====
On the October 22 episode of Raw, Guerrero was included as the Raw Managing Supervisor. On the December 10 episode of Raw, Guerrero defeated AJ Lee with help from Brad Maddox, who was the special referee for the match. At the Tables, Ladders & Chairs pay-per-view, Guerrero tried to help Dolph Ziggler in his ladder match against Cena, until she was attacked by AJ, who betrayed Cena and helped Ziggler win. The following night on Raw, Guerrero teamed with Cena to defeat the new couple of Ziggler and AJ by disqualification due to interference from Big E Langston.

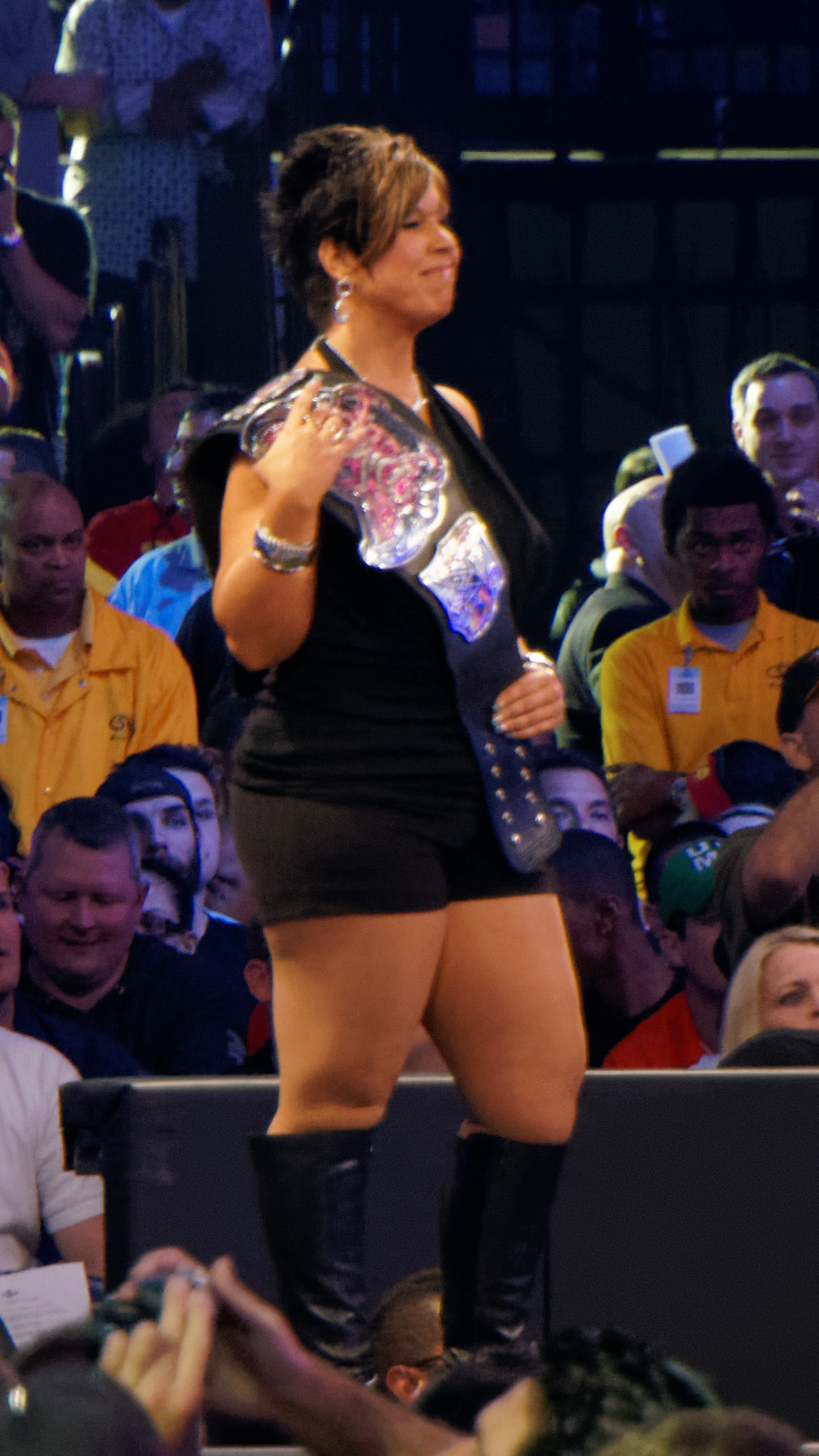
Guerrero holding the Divas Championship belt at WrestleMania XXX in 2014

On the February 18, 2013, episode of Raw, Guerrero named Brad Maddox as her assistant. On the July 8 episode of Raw, was removed and Maddox was pointed as the Raw General Manager. Guerrero appeared on the July 19 episode of SmackDown as the new General Manager of SmackDown. On the November 18 episode of Raw, wrestled against the Divas Champion AJ Lee, which she lost. On March 24, 2014, episode of Raw, after hearing insulting comments from AJ towards her, Guerrero forced AJ to defend her Divas Championship in a 14-woman "Vickie Guerrero Invitational" at WrestleMania XXX. On June 23 episode of Raw, Guerrero lost in a pudding match against Stephanie McMahon with her job on the line, after interference by Alicia Fox, Layla and Rosa Mendes. She was then fired as general manager of both shows, but got her retribution over McMahon by throwing her into the mud pool and mouthed, "I love you," a tribute to her late husband, Eddie Guerrero, and performed his signature taunt while leaving the stage. This was done to write her off television, as she had requested her release a few months before.

==== Sporadic appearances (2016–2018, 2024-present) ====
On the July 4, 2016 episode of Raw, Vickie returned during a segments where she wanted to become the new "SmackDown Chief Operating Officer" after the WWE Brand Extension. On January 28, 2018, at the Royal Rumble, Vickie made a surprise entrance at number 16 during the first women's Royal Rumble match. On September 13, 2024, Vickie was shown in attendance for SmackDown's return to the USA Network. Guerrero was shown in the crowd at Saturday Night's Main Event XL and the following night at Evolution.

=== All Elite Wrestling (2019–2023) ===
On December 11, 2019, she appeared as a guest commentator for All Elite Wrestling taping of AEW Dark Episode 11 that premiered December 17, 2019 on YouTube. According to Vickie, this appearance caused WWE to "cut her off". On July 15, 2020, at Fight for the Fallen, Vickie was revealed as Nyla Rose's manager. On the special Friday June 4, 2021, edition of Dynamite. Vickie introduced Andrade El Idolo to AEW. For the next two years, Guerrero would primarily appear on AEW's second-tier programming, AEW Dark and Dark: Elevation alongside Nyla Rose and Marina Shafir. In February 2023, it was revealed that Vickie and AEW management came to an agreement that Vickie's contract would not be renewed once it expired. On April 6, 2023, Vickie's roster page was removed from the AEW website.

== Professional wrestling style and persona ==
Guerrero's approach to her work as manager is "to make them shine and do my little part and just be there at the right moment and the right time to do the right thing" while "my role is just an embellishment of the superstar that's in the ring. I don't want to overshadow them". She uses the catchphrase "Excuse me", which draws almost universally negative reaction from the crowd.

== Other media ==
Vickie has appeared in two video games. She made her in-game debut in WWE '12 as a playable DLC character and in WWE 2K15 as an exclusive manager for the Microsoft Windows, Xbox One and PlayStation 4 versions.

In 2019, Vickie began hosting her own podcast, Excuse Me: The Vickie Guerrero Show.

== Personal life ==
Benson is a Christian of French and Mexican descent. Vickie married Eddie Guerrero on April 24, 1990, after three years of dating. Guerrero's father encouraged them to marry following the announcement of Vickie's first pregnancy. Together, Vickie and Eddie had two daughters: Shaul Marie Guerrero (born October 14, 1990), who is married to fellow professional wrestler Aiden English, and Sherilyn Amber Guerrero (born July 8, 1995). They were married until his death on November 13, 2005.

On June 18, 2015, Vickie announced her engagement to partner Kris Benson, and the two were married on September 12, 2015. In March 2023, Vickie's younger daughter, Sherilyn, accused Benson of sexually assaulting her while on a cruise in 2020. Vickie's older daughter, Shaul, as well as Chavo Guerrero Jr. backed Sherilyn's claim, while Vickie and Benson vehemently denied the accusations.

After leaving WWE in 2014, she revealed her plans to start a new career in medical administration. Vickie became officially certified as a medical office administrator and was hired by a pharmaceutical company as a medical administrator. In 2019, she graduated from Herzing University with a Bachelor of Science in healthcare administration.

== Awards and accomplishments ==
- The Baltimore Sun
  - Non-Wrestler of the Year (2008)
- World Wrestling Entertainment / WWE
  - Miss WrestleMania (1 time)
  - Slammy Award for Couple of the Year (2008) – with Edge
- Wrestling Observer Newsletter
  - Best Non-Wrestler (2009, 2010)
