= Survivor Series (2008) =

World Wrestling Entertainment pay-per-view event

- Promotional poster featuring John Cena
- Promotion: World Wrestling Entertainment
- Brand(s): Raw; SmackDown; ECW
- Date: November 23, 2008
- City: Boston, Massachusetts
- Venue: TD Banknorth Garden
- Attendance: 12,498
- Buy rate: 319,000
- Tagline: Spoilin' for a Fight

Pay-per-view chronology
← Previous; Cyber Sunday	Next → Armageddon

Survivor Series chronology
← Previous; 2007	Next → 2009

The 2008 Survivor Series was a professional wrestling pay-per-view (PPV) event produced by World Wrestling Entertainment (WWE). It was the 22nd annual Survivor Series and took place on November 23, 2008, at the TD Banknorth Garden in Boston, Massachusetts, held for wrestlers from the promotion's Raw, SmackDown, and ECW brand divisions. The event centered on the Survivor Series match, a tag team elimination match that pits teams of multiple wrestlers against each other.

This was the second Survivor Series to take place in Boston, after 1993. The event's card consisted of six professional wrestling matches. The event received 319,000 pay-per-view buys, less than the previous year's event. It was also the first Survivor Series PPV broadcast in high definition.

The main event match was the Raw main event, which was for the World Heavyweight Championship between the returning John Cena, who suffered a herniated disc at SummerSlam, and the champion, Chris Jericho, which Cena won by pinfall after executing a FU. Another predominant match was from Smackdown, which saw the returning Edge defeated Vladimir Kozlov, and the champion Triple H, in a Triple Threat match to win the WWE Championship. The undercard matches included The Undertaker versus The Big Show in a casket match and three Survivor Series matches.

== Production ==
=== Background ===
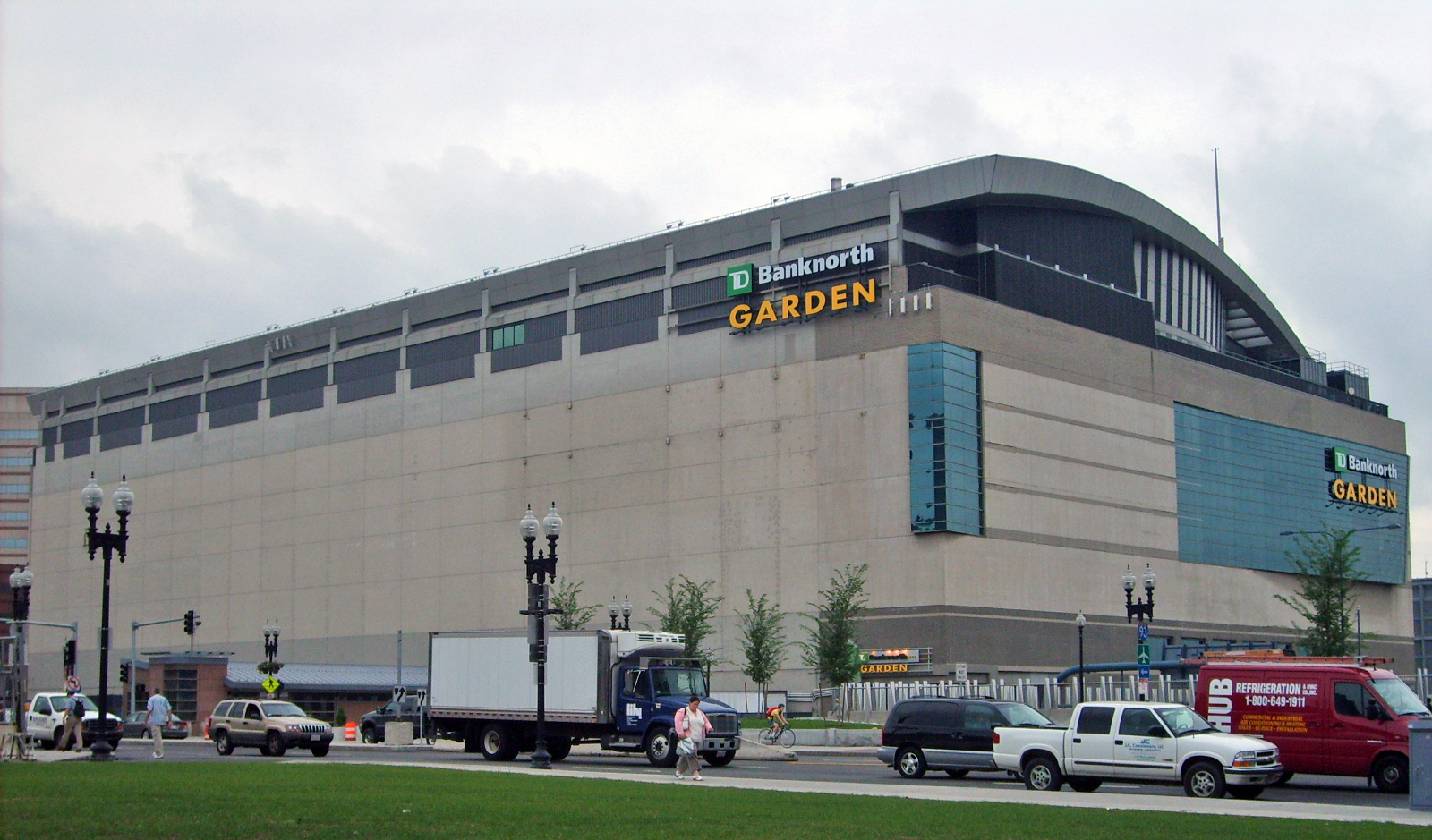
The 22nd annual Survivor Series was held at TD Banknorth Garden in Boston, Massachusetts.

Survivor Series is an annual professional wrestling pay-per-view (PPV) event, produced every November by World Wrestling Entertainment (WWE) since 1987, generally held around Thanksgiving in the United States. In what has become the second longest-running pay-per-view event in history (behind WWE's WrestleMania), it is one of the promotion's original four pay-per-views, along with WrestleMania, SummerSlam, and Royal Rumble, referred to as the "Big Four". The event is traditionally characterized by having Survivor Series matches, which are tag team elimination matches that typically pits teams of four or five wrestlers against each other. The 22nd Survivor Series was scheduled to be held on November 23, 2008, at the TD Banknorth Garden in Boston, Massachusetts, and featured wrestlers from the Raw, SmackDown, and ECW brand divisions. It was the first Survivor Series PPV broadcast in high definition.

=== Storylines ===
The event featured professional wrestling matches involving wrestlers from pre-existing scripted feuds, plots and storylines. Results were predetermined by WWE's writers on the Raw, SmackDown, and ECW brands, while storylines were produced on WWE's weekly television shows, Raw, SmackDown, and ECW.

Advertising on WWE programming and on the Survivor Series promotional poster had foreshadowed the return of John Cena, whom a herniated disk injury (that he suffered during his match with Batista at SummerSlam) had sidelined, at the event. On the November 3 episode of Raw, Shane McMahon announced that Cena would challenge for the World Heavyweight Championship at Survivor Series. Cena would face the champion resulting from a Steel Cage match between World Heavyweight Champion Batista and Chris Jericho, which Jericho won to become the new World Heavyweight Champion, setting up his match with Cena at Survivor Series.

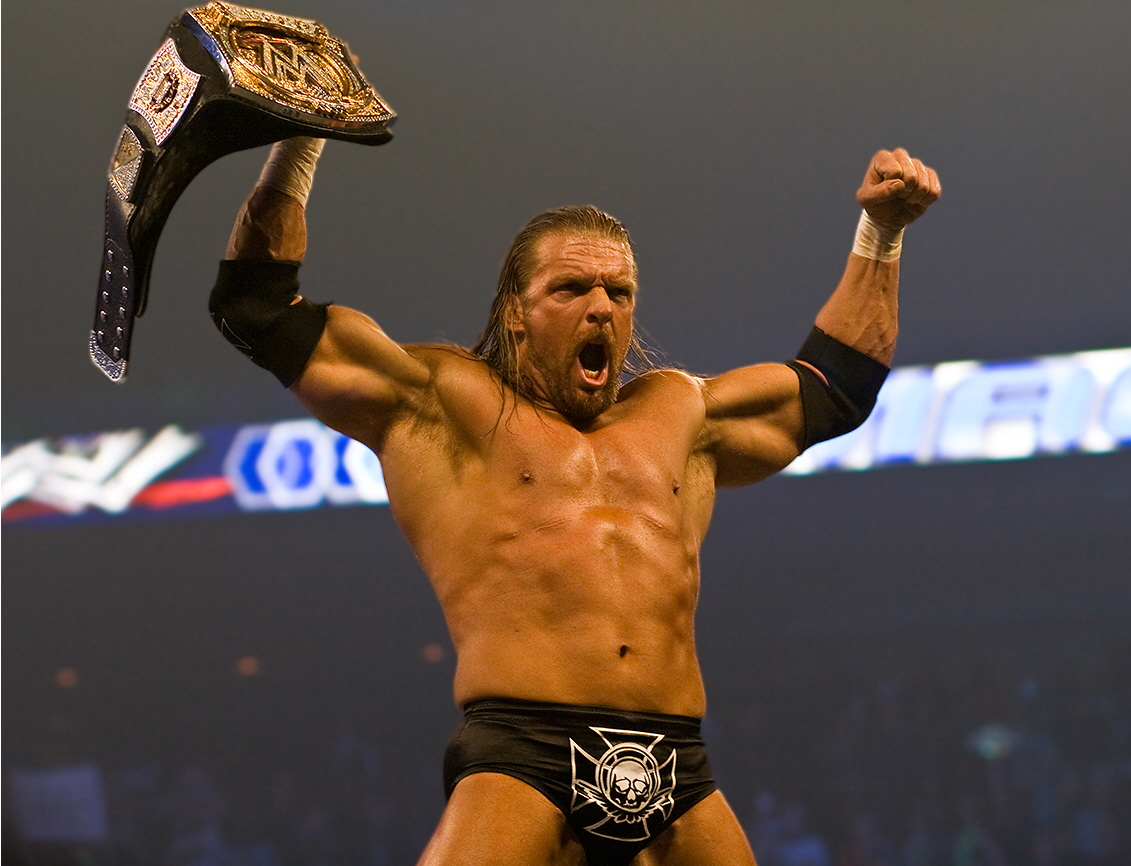
Triple H, who lost SmackDown's WWE Championship to Edge at the event

The main feud on the SmackDown brand involved Triple H, Vladimir Kozlov and Jeff Hardy, who were competing for Triple H's WWE Championship. At No Mercy in October, Hardy came close to winning the WWE title from Triple H but failed to do so when Triple H pinned him with the roll-up. Kozlov was one of the choices for Triple H's challengers at Cyber Sunday for the fans to vote, but Hardy won the poll and faced Triple H for the title, a match in which Hardy lost again. Then, after Kozlov demanded a WWE title match against Triple H on SmackDown, General manager Vickie Guerrero put Kozlov in a match against The Undertaker on the November 7 episode of SmackDown, adding that if Kozlov won, he would challenge Triple H at Survivor Series for the WWE Championship. Kozlov won the match, albeit via disqualification after Hardy interfered and hit Kozlov with a steel chair. However, after seeing Hardy defeat The Undertaker in an Extreme Rules match the following week, Guerrero scheduled Hardy in a non-title match against Triple H on the November 21 episode of SmackDown, stating that should Hardy win, she would add him to the WWE Championship match at Survivor Series, making it a triple threat match. Hardy won the match and earned the title opportunity. However, it was announced during the event that Hardy was found unconscious in a hotel stairwell in Boston, casting doubt over whether he would be able to compete in the match.

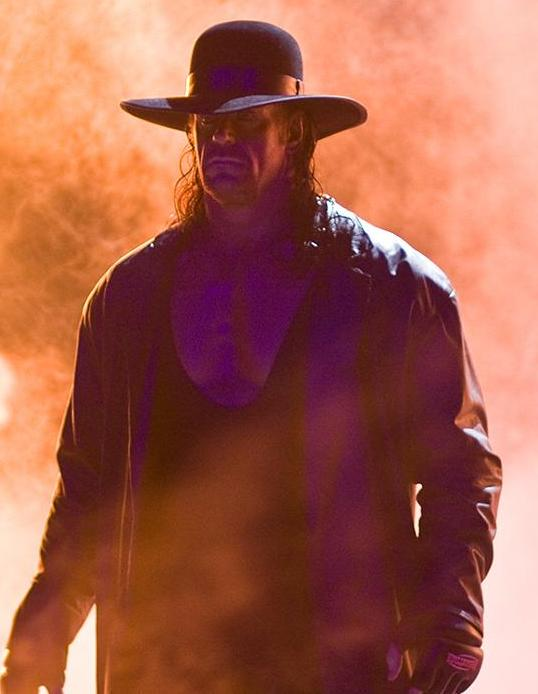
The Undertaker faced Big Show in a casket match.

Another feud from SmackDown heading into Survivor Series took place between The Undertaker and Big Show. At Unforgiven, Big Show betrayed The Undertaker and attacked him, punching him in the head on several occasions. At No Mercy, in a match between the two, Big Show knocked The Undertaker out with two punches to the face and one to the back of the head, prompting the referee to rule the match a knockout in Big Show's favour. However, at Cyber Sunday, when the fans voted for a Last Man Standing match, The Undertaker defeated Big Show by choking him out with the Hell's Gate. On the October 31 episode of SmackDown, The Undertaker defeated Chavo Guerrero in a casket match despite Big Show's interference. On the November 7 episode of SmackDown, Big Show challenged The Undertaker to a casket match at Survivor Series.

Three inter-promotional Survivor Series Elimination matches were scheduled for the event. In one match, Shawn Michaels captained the team of Rey Mysterio, The Great Khali, and Cryme Tyme (JTG and Shad Gaspard) against John "Bradshaw" Layfield (JBL) and his team of Montel Vontavious Porter (MVP), Kane, John Morrison, and The Miz. The feud that led to the Team HBK vs. Team JBL match began between Rey Mysterio and Kane over the summer then a couple of months later, the Team of Cryme Tyme (from the Raw brand) started their own feud against John Morrison and The Miz (from the ECW brand). From SmackDown, MVP and The Great Khali had their own issues in the few weeks leading up to Survivor Series. The main rivalry between the captains, Michaels and JBL, began on the October 27 episode of Raw, when JBL attacked Michaels before a tag-team match between the latter and Batista, taking on JBL and Chris Jericho. Despite the assault, Michaels and Batista defeated JBL and Jericho. The next week, a match between JBL and The Undertaker took place, which Undertaker won by countout. Moments after the match, Michaels threw JBL back into the ring, allowing Undertaker to perform a Tombstone Piledriver on JBL. On the November 10 episode of Raw, JBL retaliated when he helped Chris Jericho defeat Michaels in a Last Man Standing match.

Another match featured Batista captaining the team of Matt Hardy, R-Truth, CM Punk, and Kofi Kingston, and facing off against the team captained by Randy Orton, consisting of Shelton Benjamin, William Regal, Cody Rhodes, and Mark Henry. The rivalry between the captains, Batista and Orton began on the November 10 episode of Raw, when Batista invoked his rematch clause against Chris Jericho, whom he lost the World title the week before in a Steel cage match. Stephanie McMahon, however, appeared in the titantron to address Batista, alerting him that due to her brother, Shane's promise that whoever won the Steel cage match would go on to face John Cena for the title at Survivor Series, she was unable to grant Batista his rematch request until after the pay-per-view event. Following this, Orton made his way to the ring, dredging up bad history from he and Batista's days in Evolution several years earlier. Orton then said that after Cena, it was his turn for a title opportunity, not Batista's. On the November 17 episode of Raw, Orton defeated Punk in a Lumberjack match with the help of then WWE Intercontinental Champion, William Regal. After the match, Batista entered the ring and attacked Orton, leading all of the superstars present to get involved in what became an out-of-control brawl that ended the show.

The third match announced was a Divas Elimination match, in which Beth Phoenix led Team Raw composed of Mickie James, Candice Michelle, Kelly Kelly, and Jillian Hall, against Team SmackDown, which featured Michelle McCool as captain, Victoria, Maria, Maryse, and Natalya. On the October 3 episode of SmackDown, Women's Champion Phoenix defeated the Divas Champion McCool in a Lumberjill match due to interference from Maryse. The feud between Phoenix and McCool restarted on the November 17 episode of Raw, when Raw Diva, Kelly Kelly fought SmackDown Diva Victoria and was victorious. As a result of this, Victoria attacked her opponent after the bell before Kelly's fellow Raw Divas ran to her rescue.

== Event ==
Other on-screen personnel
Role:	Name:
English commentators	Michael Cole (Raw)
English commentators	Jerry Lawler (Raw)
English commentators	Jim Ross (SmackDown)
English commentators	Tazz (SmackDown)
English commentators	Todd Grisham (ECW)
English commentators	Matt Striker (ECW)
Spanish commentators	Carlos Cabrera
Spanish commentators	Hugo Savinovich
Backstage interviewers	Eve Torres
Backstage interviewers	Todd Grisham
Ring announcer	Lilian Garcia (Raw)
Ring announcer	Justin Roberts (SmackDown)
Referees	Charles Robinson
Referees	John Cone
Referees	Mike Chioda
Referees	Scott Armstrong
Referees	Marty Elias
Referees	Chad Patton

Before Survivor Series aired on pay-per-view, The Brian Kendrick defeated Kung Fu Naki in an untelevised match.

=== Preliminary matches ===
The actual pay-per-view opened with a Survivor Series elimination match between Team HBK (Shawn Michaels, Rey Mysterio, Cryme Tyme (Shad Gaspard and JTG) and The Great Khali) and Team JBL (John "Bradshaw" Layfield (JBL), Kane, Montel Vontavious Porter (MVP), John Morrison, and The Miz). 7 minutes into the match; the first four eliminations of JTG, MVP, Kane and Gaspard took place. JBL, The Miz and Morrison dominated Michaels where JBL bruised Michaels' eye. Morrison taunted Michaels using the latter's techniques but couldn't execute them properly. Michaels made a desperate tag to Rey Mysterio who after a flurry of offense connected with "619" and a splash on Miz and eliminated him. Later on, JBL and Morrison dominated Rey Mysterio who after a Moonsault on JBL tagged in Michaels. Michaels and JBL took the fight outside the ring, before Michaels made it before the 10-count, and JBL was eliminated by countout. Morrison tried to do the Sweet Chin Music on Michaels but Michaels countered with one of his own to eliminate Morrison and bring the victory to his team. Khali, Mysterio and Michaels were the survivors.

The second match was a Divas Survivor Series elimination match between Team Raw (Beth Phoenix, Mickie James, Kelly Kelly, Candice Michelle, and Jillian Hall) and Team SmackDown (Michelle McCool, Victoria, Maria, Maryse, and Natalya). Victoria was eliminated by Kelly Kelly with a Rana pin. Kelly Kelly was eliminated by Maryse after a Side Slam Backbreaker. McCool was eliminated by Mickie after a Mickie-DDT. James was eliminated by Maryse with a roll-up. Natalya was eliminated by Candice after a Spear. Hall was eliminated by Maria with a victory roll. Maria was eliminated by Candice with a Bridging Northern Light Suplex pin. Candice was eliminated by Maryse after submitting to a modified Figure Four Leglock. Maryse was eliminated by Phoenix after a Glam Slam, leaving Phoenix as the sole survivor.

Next, The Undertaker faced Big Show in a casket match. During the match, The Undertaker executed a Leg Drop through a broadcast table on Big Show. Big Show performed a Chokeslam on The Undertaker and tried to walk away but The Undertaker stopped him. The two fought on the entrance ramp, where Big Show set up the casket. The match ended when The Undertaker performed an Irish Whip on Big Show, knocking him into a casket. As the casket fell over, The Undertaker won the match.

The fourth match was a Survivor Series elimination match between Team Orton (Randy Orton, Shelton Benjamin, William Regal, Cody Rhodes, and Mark Henry) and Team Batista (Batista, CM Punk, Kofi Kingston, Matt Hardy, and R-Truth). Regal was eliminated by Punk after a GTS. R-Truth was eliminated by Benjamin after a Paydirt. Kingston was eliminated by Orton after a Rope-Hung DDT. Punk was eliminated by Rhodes after a Silver Spoon DDT. Hardy was eliminated by Henry after a World's Strongest Slam. Henry was eliminated by Batista after a Spear. Benjamin was eliminated by Batista after a Batista Bomb. Batista was eliminated by Orton after an RKO, leaving Orton and Rhodes as the survivors.

=== Main event matches ===
The first main event match began as a standard match for the WWE Championship between Triple H and Vladimir Kozlov. After Triple H executed a Pedigree on Kozlov, Vickie Guerrero changed the match into a triple threat match also involving Edge, marking Edge's first appearance since SummerSlam. Edge performed a Spear on Triple H but was attacked by Jeff Hardy, who was originally scheduled to be in the match. Hardy tried to hit Edge with a chair but hit Triple H instead. Hardy then also hit Kozlov with the chair but Edge performed a Spear on Hardy. Edge pinned Triple H to win the title.

In the final match, Chris Jericho defended the World Heavyweight Championship against John Cena, who returned from injury after suffering a herniated disc in his neck at SummerSlam. During the match, Cena attempted a Five Knuckle Shuffle on Jericho but Jericho applied the Liontamer on Cena, which he countered. Jericho applied the Walls of Jericho but Cena reached the ropes to break the hold. Cena performed an FU on Jericho for a near-fall. Cena attempted another FU on Jericho but Jericho countered with a Codebreaker for a near-fall. Cena applied the STF on Jericho but Jericho countered with a small package for a near-fall. Cena performed another FU on Jericho to win the title.

== Reception ==
The event was voted by Wrestling Observer Newsletter as the worst pay-per-view of 2008; the WWE Championship match was voted as the worst match of 2008; and Jeff Hardy's hotel room unconsciousness, used as the kayfabe reason for his removal from said WWE Championship match was voted as that year's Most Disgusting Promotional Tactic.

The event received 319,000 pay per view buys, down from 341,000 the previous year, which contributed to a decline of $4 million in pay-per-view revenue for WWE in the fourth quarter of 2008.

== Aftermath ==
=== Raw ===
The feud between John Cena and Chris Jericho continued on into Armageddon, where Cena defeated Jericho to retain the World Heavyweight Championship.

After the SmackDown Divas were defeated at Survivor Series, Michelle McCool began turning heel when she attacked Maria after losing a non-title match to her on the December 5 episode of SmackDown. Two weeks later, Maryse defeated Maria to earn a shot at Michelle's WWE Divas Championship. On the December 26 episode of SmackDown, Maryse defeated Michelle to capture the Divas Championship in a match where Maria was the guest referee.

=== SmackDown ===
After Edge returned and captured the WWE Championship, Triple H, Jeff Hardy, and Vladimir Kozlov participated in a Beat The Clock challenge for the number one contender's spot. Kozlov lost his match to Matt Hardy, while Jeff Hardy and Triple H each won their matches in exactly the same time. Due to the results, a reluctant Vickie Guerrero scheduled Edge to defend his WWE Championship against both Hardy and Triple H in a triple threat match at Armageddon. At Armageddon, Hardy defeated Edge and Triple H to win his first WWE Championship. The situation with Jeff Hardy was tied into the lead up to his match at WrestleMania 25 against his brother Matt Hardy, who claimed responsibility for attacking him.

The day after Survivor Series, Melina returned from injury and resumed her feud with Beth Phoenix that had begun back in June. On the December 29 episode of Raw, Melina won a battle royal to become the number one contender to Phoenix's WWE Women's Championship. At the Royal Rumble, Melina defeated Phoenix to win her third Women's Championship.

== Results ==
No.	Results	Stipulations	Times
1^{D}	The Brian Kendrick defeated Kung Fu Naki by pinfall	Singles match	—
2	Team HBK (Shawn Michaels, The Great Khali, JTG, Rey Mysterio, and Shad Gaspard) (with Ranjin Singh) defeated Team JBL (John "Bradshaw" Layfield, John Morrison, Kane, The Miz, and Montel Vontavious Porter)^{1}	5-on-5 Survivor Series match	18:13
3	Team Raw (Beth Phoenix, Candice Michelle, Jillian Hall, Kelly Kelly, and Mickie James) (with Santino Marella) defeated Team SmackDown (Maria, Maryse, Michelle McCool, Natalya, and Victoria)^{2}	5-on-5 Survivor Series match	09:39
4	The Undertaker defeated Big Show	Casket match	12:45
5	Team Orton (Randy Orton, Cody Rhodes, Mark Henry, Shelton Benjamin, and William Regal) (with Layla, Manu, and Tony Atlas) defeated Team Batista (Batista, CM Punk, Kofi Kingston, Matt Hardy, and R-Truth)^{3}	5-on-5 Survivor Series match	16:13
6	Edge defeated Vladimir Kozlov and Triple H (c) by pinfall	Triple threat match for the WWE Championship (Note: This started as a singles match between Triple H and Kozlov, but Vickie Guerrero announced during the match that Edge was a participant, making it a Triple Threat match.)	14:22
7	John Cena defeated Chris Jericho (c) by pinfall	Singles match for the World Heavyweight Championship	21:19
(c) / – the champion(s) heading into the match; D / – this was a dark match

=== Survivor Series matches ===
^1

Eliminated	Wrestler	Eliminated by	Team	Method	Time
1	JTG	MVP	Team HBK	Play Of The Day	01:41
2	MVP	The Great Khali	Team JBL	Brain Chop	01:54
3	Kane	Rey Mysterio	Team JBL	Pinned after Khali put Rey on his shoulders and Rey hit a splash	03:26
4	Shad Gaspard	The Miz	Team HBK	Reality Check	06:30
5	The Miz	Rey Mysterio	Team JBL	Splash	11:45
6	John "Bradshaw" Layfield	N/A	Team JBL	Countout	17:57
7	John Morrison	Shawn Michaels	Team JBL	Sweet Chin Music	18:13
Survivor(s):	Shawn Michaels, Rey Mysterio, and The Great Khali (Team HBK)				18:13

^2

Eliminated	Wrestler	Eliminated by	Team	Method	Time
1	Victoria	Kelly Kelly	Team SmackDown	Pinfall	02:54
2	Kelly Kelly	Maryse	Team Raw	Pinfall	03:23
3	Michelle McCool	Mickie James	Team SmackDown	Pinfall	05:07
4	Mickie James	Maryse	Team Raw	Pinfall	05:26
5	Natalya	Candice Michelle	Team SmackDown	Pinfall	06:45
6	Jillian Hall	Maria	Team Raw	Pinfall	07:44
7	Maria	Candice Michelle	Team SmackDown	Pinfall	07:55
8	Candice Michelle	Maryse	Team Raw	Pinfall	08:38
9	Maryse	Beth Phoenix	Team SmackDown	Pinfall	09:39
Sole Survivor:	Beth Phoenix (Team Raw)				09:39

^3

Eliminated	Wrestler	Eliminated by	Team	Method	Time
1	William Regal	CM Punk	Team Orton	GTS	00:11
2	R-Truth	Shelton Benjamin	Team Batista	Paydirt	07:38
3	Kofi Kingston	Randy Orton	Team Batista	Rope Hung DDT	10:45
4	CM Punk	Cody Rhodes	Team Batista	DDT	13:06
5	Matt Hardy	Mark Henry	Team Batista	World’s Strongest Slam	14:22
6	Mark Henry	Batista	Team Orton	Spear	14:32
7	Shelton Benjamin	Batista	Team Orton	Batista Bomb	15:06
8	Batista	Randy Orton	Team Batista	RKO	16:13
Survivor(s):	Randy Orton and Cody Rhodes (Team Orton)				16:13
