= Royal Rumble match =

Professional wrestling match type

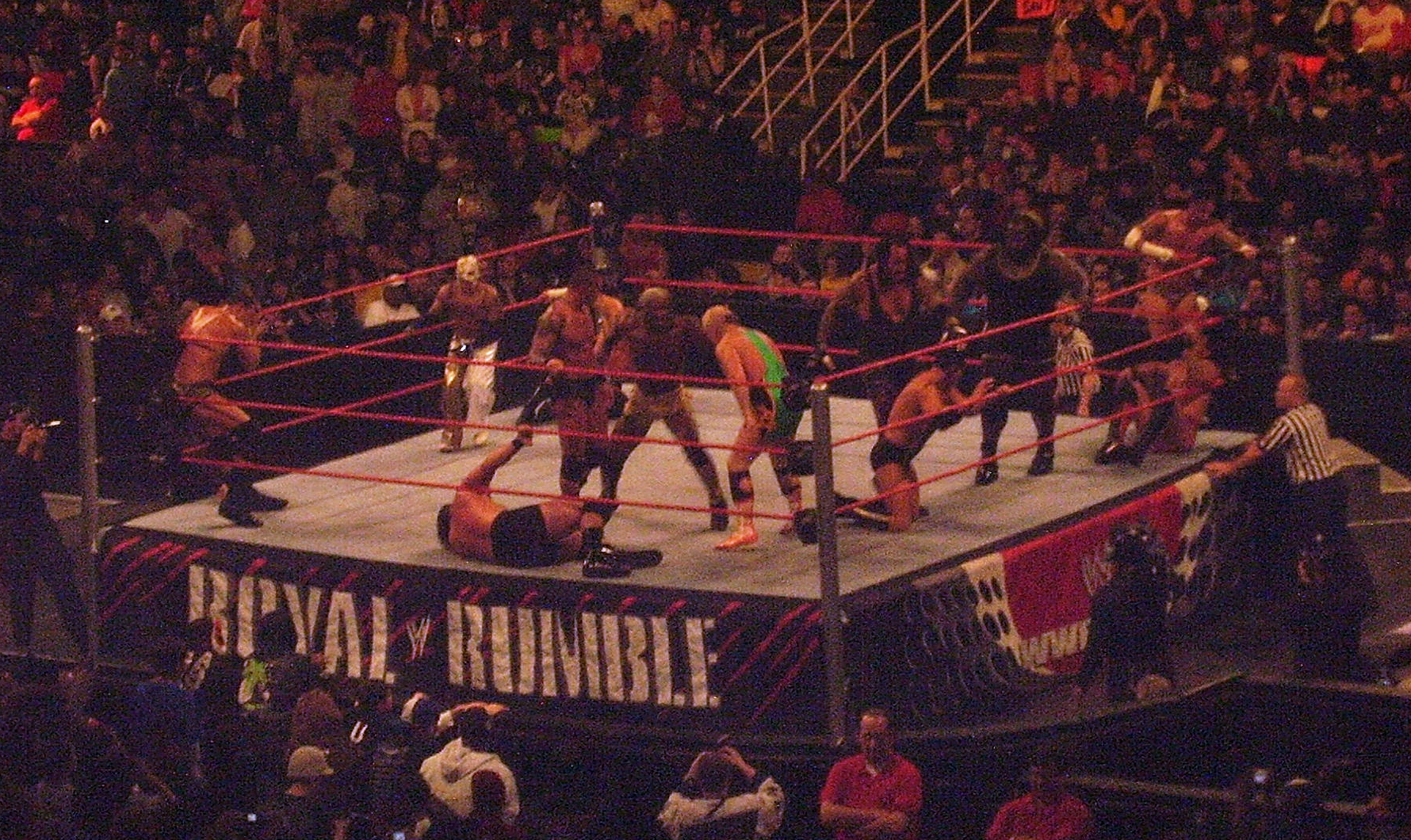
- WWE Royal Rumble match in 2009
- Founded: October 1987
- Founder: Pat Patterson; Vince McMahon
- Organizing body: WWE
- Competitors: 30; 20 (1988); 40 (2011); 50 (GRR)
- Most recent champions: Roman Reigns (men's); Liv Morgan (women's) (2026)
- Most titles: Stone Cold Steve Austin (three)
- Tournament format: Staggered entry battle royal

Notes
- A: The Royal Rumble match traditionally features 30 competitors, though some exceptions have been made in select matches.

The Royal Rumble match is a professional wrestling match based on the classic battle royal match in which a number of wrestlers (traditionally 30) aim at eliminating their competitors by tossing them over the top rope, with both feet touching the floor. The match is typically the main event of WWE's January pay-per-view and livestreaming event known as the Royal Rumble. The winner of the event is the last wrestler remaining after all others have been eliminated. The Royal Rumble match was created by wrestler and WWE Hall of Famer Pat Patterson and was first staged at a house show in October 1987. The winner of the match is usually awarded with a World title match, most commonly at WWE's largest event WrestleMania.

The term "Royal Rumble" is trademarked by WWE. However, multiple other professional wrestling promotions have introduced their own derivations of the Royal Rumble match, for example World War 3 in World Championship Wrestling, the Gauntlet for the Gold in Total Nonstop Action Wrestling, and the Casino Battle Royale in All Elite Wrestling.

== Concept ==
The Royal Rumble differs from the classical battle royal as the contestants do not enter the ring at the same time, but instead are assigned entry numbers, usually via a lottery, although desirable spots are occasionally assigned by other means, the most common being winning a match. The match begins with the two wrestlers who have drawn entry numbers one and two, with the remaining wrestlers entering the ring at regular timed intervals, either 90 seconds or two minutes (60 seconds for the 1995 event), according to their entry number. This format is credited to Pat Patterson. To date, only six wrestlers who have been one of the starting two entrants have won the Royal Rumble: Shawn Michaels in 1995, Vince McMahon in 1999, Chris Benoit in 2004, Rey Mysterio in 2006, Edge in 2021, and Rhea Ripley in 2023. (Michaels, Benoit, Edge, and Ripley were entrant number 1 while McMahon and Mysterio were number 2), while only five wrestlers who have been the final entrant won the Royal Rumble: The Undertaker in 2007, John Cena in 2008, Triple H in 2016, Brock Lesnar in 2022, and Cody Rhodes in 2023. The most common number to win is 30, and 16 eventual winners entered at number 25 or later.

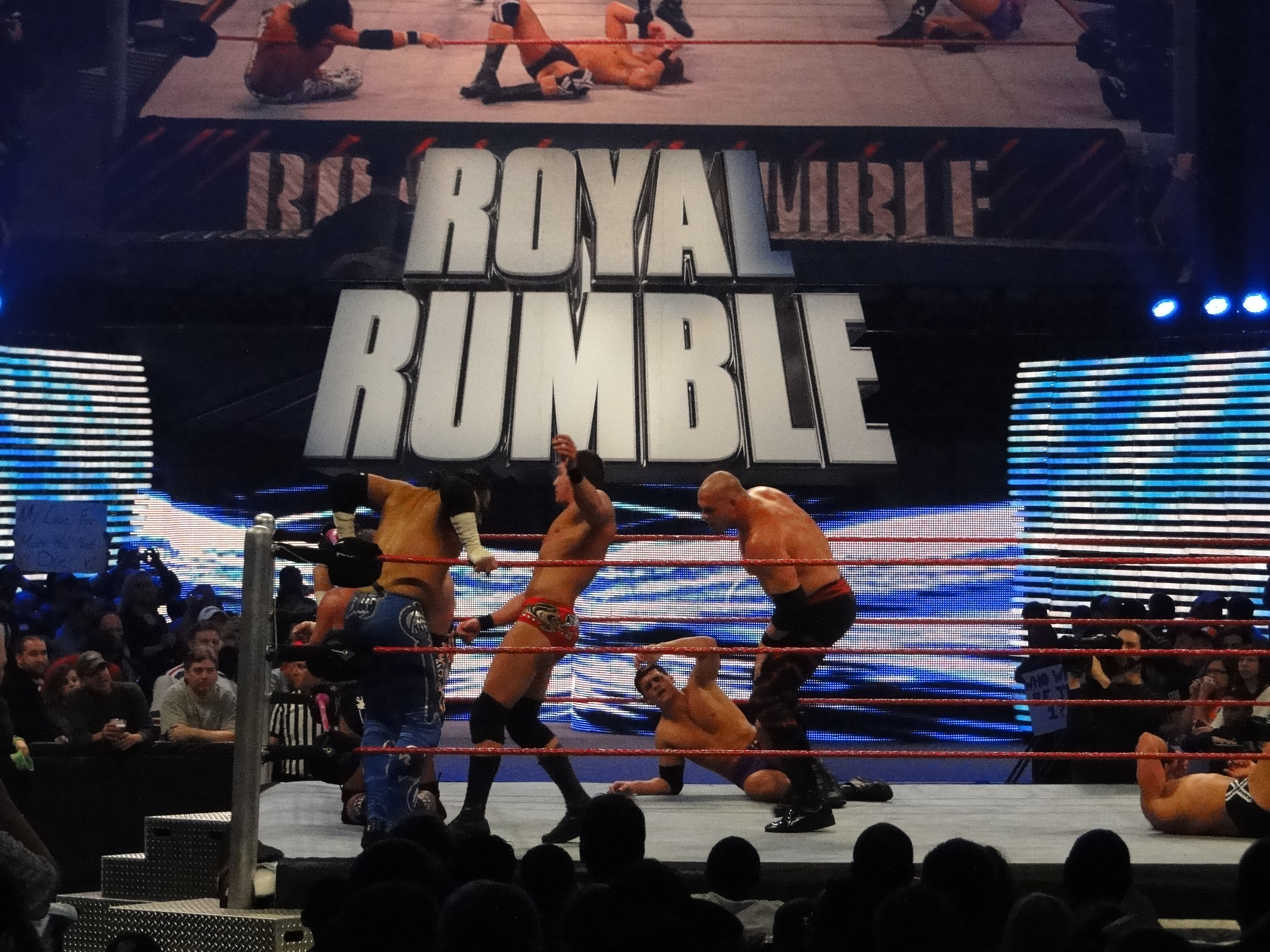
2010 Royal Rumble match

The Royal Rumble match traditionally involves 30 wrestlers and usually lasts an hour (the 2011 edition had a 40-man field). The 2025 men's installment of the match was the longest, lasting one hour and 20 minutes while the first televised Rumble match in 1988 involved only 20 men and lasted 33 minutes of the two-hour broadcast. The 1998 match nominally had the traditional 30-man field, but only 28 individual wrestlers competed as Mick Foley entered the Royal Rumble match three different times as three different gimmicks—first as Cactus Jack, then Mankind and finally Dude Love. The 2018 Royal Rumble PPV was the first to include a women's Royal Rumble match, contested under the same rules as the men's match, including having 30 participants.

According to the rules, participants are eliminated from the match if moved over the top rope and both feet touch the floor. Hence, a wrestler who exits the ring without going over the top rope is not eliminated from the contest. For example, during the 1999 match, both McMahon and "Stone Cold" Steve Austin left the ring only to return later in the match. Furthermore, a wrestler who only touches the floor with one foot is not eliminated from the match, a rule which greatly affected the 1995 match, allowing Michaels to re-enter the ring and win the match. Although he has not won a Royal Rumble match, Kofi Kingston has become synonymous with finding various ways to keep at least one of his feet from touching the floor. In the 1994 match, the last two participants (Bret Hart and Lex Luger) were declared co-winners when officials were unable to determine whose feet touched the floor first. Although this was the intended outcome, a similar situation occurred by a legitimate accident in 2005, when Batista and John Cena eliminated each other and hit the ground at exactly the same time. This time, the match was restarted. Though various referees are charged with observing the match, some eliminations have gone unnoticed to allow the eliminated participants to sneak back into the ring to continue. Austin was able to re-enter the ring in this way and win the 1997 match.

Although eliminations are usually caused by active participants, eliminations caused by other means have been ruled legitimate, including self-eliminations (such as André the Giant after seeing a snake in 1989, Mil Máscaras diving out of the ring from the turnbuckle in 1997, Kane in 1999, and Pat McAfee in 2024, although Randy Savage's jump over the top rope in 1992 was not ruled as self-elimination), elimination by previously eliminated participants (such as The Undertaker eliminating Maven in 2002, Kurt Angle eliminating Michaels in 2005 or Sonya Deville eliminating Naomi in 2022) or non-participants (such as Shane McMahon eliminating Shawn Michaels in 2006 and The Miz eliminating John Cena in 2011). Furthermore, an injured wrestler can return to the ring as long as the match is still ongoing (such as Austin in 1999, Roman Reigns in 2016, and Randy Orton in 2021), but not if the match has already ended (such as Spike Dudley in 2004, Scotty 2 Hotty in 2005, and Rey Mysterio in 2023) and can also be replaced by another wrestler (such as Mick Foley replacing Test in 2004, Erick Rowan replacing Curtis Axel in 2015, Sami Zayn replacing Tye Dillinger in 2018, Nia Jax replacing R-Truth in 2019, Becky Lynch replacing Lana in 2019 and IShowSpeed replacing Akira Tozawa in 2025).

== Prize ==
Since 1993, the winner of the Royal Rumble match is traditionally awarded a title match for WWE's top championship at WrestleMania—WWE currently promotes two main roster brands with a top championship for each and the winner can choose which championship to challenge for, regardless of the brand they belong to. For the men, that is the World Heavyweight Championship on Raw and the Undisputed WWE Championship on SmackDown. Similarly, the winner of the women's Royal Rumble match (first contested in 2018) is awarded a match at WrestleMania for their choice of one of WWE's top women's championships: Raw's Women's World Championship or SmackDown's WWE Women's Championship.

With the first brand extension introduced in mid-2002, the 30 male entrants from 2003 to 2006 consisted of 15 wrestlers from the Raw and SmackDown brands, respectively. At first, the winner of the match received a shot for their brand's top championship, either the original World Heavyweight Championship or the WWE Championship. Starting in 2004, the Royal Rumble winner had the option of challenging for either brand's top championship. For instance, Chris Benoit switched from SmackDown to Raw after winning the 2004 event to challenge for Raw's top championship at the time. From 2007 to 2010, participants from the ECW brand competed along with the Raw and SmackDown brands, with the ECW Championship added as an option, although no winner ever chose it. During ECW's participation, the entries for each brand were not evenly divided. The ECW Championship was deactivated in 2010, leaving the two remaining titles until they were unified in December 2013 as the WWE World Heavyweight Championship. This singular option lasted until the brand extensions' return in 2016, which introduced the WWE Universal Championship, as the WWE World Heavyweight Championship reverted to being called the WWE Championship. Like the first brand extension, the winner of the 2017 event earned a match for their brand's top championship, the Universal Championship or WWE Championship, but beginning with the 2018 event, the winner has a choice. NXT—WWE's developmental brand—was elevated to main roster status from September 2019 until September 2021, during that time NXT's top championships (the NXT Championship for men and the NXT Women's Championship for women) were also eligible choices. This ended when NXT reverted back to developmental status in September 2021. In April 2022, the WWE Championship and Universal Championship were unified as the Undisputed WWE Universal Championship, although their respective title lineages remained separate; however, the two titles together as the Undisputed title was the only choice for the men's Rumble winner in 2023. In April 2023, a new World Heavyweight Championship was introduced and the Universal Championship was then retired in April 2024 with the WWE Championship subsequently referred to as the Undisputed WWE Championship. Since the return of the brand extension, the number of participants from each brand has not been evenly divided, as matches have also featured NXT wrestlers, as well has surprise entrants such as WWE Hall of Famers and/or debuting wrestlers, and later, wrestlers from WWE's partner promotion Total Nonstop Action Wrestling (TNA) as well as sister promotion Lucha Libre AAA Worldwide (AAA), which WWE acquired in April 2025.

WWE's top championship has been booked as on the line during the Royal Rumble match on two occasions. In 1992, the vacant WWF World Heavyweight Championship was contested in the Royal Rumble match, which was won by Ric Flair, while in 2016, Roman Reigns was scheduled to defend his WWE World Heavyweight Championship as a participant of that year's Royal Rumble match as entrant number one. This has thus far been the only time that a reigning champion had to defend his title in the match, which was ultimately won by Triple H, who eliminated Reigns before lastly eliminating Dean Ambrose to win; Reigns would earn a rematch against Triple H at WrestleMania 32 and won back the title. In 2008, ECW Champion Chavo Guerrero entered the Royal Rumble match as entrant number 26 before being eliminated by eventual winner John Cena. This was the first time in which a reigning world champion competed in the match in which the winner could challenge them. In 2020, although he did not defend his title in the match, WWE Champion Brock Lesnar entered the Royal Rumble match as entrant number 1, feeling as if no one on any brand deserved to challenge him at either the Royal Rumble or WrestleMania. Lesnar's participation was used as a way to set up his WrestleMania challenger, which ended up being Drew McIntyre, who eliminated Lesnar, won the Rumble match and then challenged Lesnar for his title at WrestleMania 36. In 2022, although she did not defend her title in the match, SmackDown Women's Champion Charlotte Flair entered the Royal Rumble match as entrant number 17, feeling as if no one on any brand deserved to challenge her at either the Royal Rumble or WrestleMania. This was the first time in which a reigning women's champion competed in the match in which the champion could choose their opponent; Flair's participation was used as a way to set up her WrestleMania challenger, which ended up being Ronda Rousey, who eliminated Flair, won the Rumble match and then challenged Flair for her title at WrestleMania 38.

The Royal Rumble winner may also choose to put his championship opportunity on the line in a match. This was first done in 1996, when Shawn Michaels risked his WrestleMania XII WWF Championship opportunity in a match against Owen Hart at In Your House 6. The second time was in 2002, when Triple H lost his WrestleMania X8 Undisputed WWF Championship opportunity at No Way Out to Kurt Angle, but regained his spot in a rematch against Angle on the following episode of Raw. The third time was in 2006, when Randy Orton defeated Rey Mysterio at No Way Out for Mysterio's WrestleMania 22 World Heavyweight Championship opportunity, though Mysterio was reinserted into the title match, making it a triple threat match. The fourth time was on the February 25, 2013 edition of Raw, where John Cena successfully defended his WrestleMania 29 WWE Championship opportunity in a match against CM Punk. The fifth time was in 2015 at Fastlane, where Reigns defended his WrestleMania 31 WWE World Heavyweight Championship opportunity against Daniel Bryan. In a reverse case in 2008, John Cena decided that instead of waiting until WrestleMania XXIV, he would use his world championship opportunity and challenge WWE Champion Orton at the preceding No Way Out event, though won the match but not the title when Orton intentionally got himself disqualified; however, after Triple H became Orton's WrestleMania opponent, Cena earned another opportunity and was inserted into that championship match, making it a triple threat match. In another case in 2017, Randy Orton relinquished his WrestleMania 33 WWE Championship opportunity after his stablemate Bray Wyatt won the title, but later turned on Wyatt and reverted his decision; he then defeated AJ Styles, who had become the new title challenger, to re-earn his title shot at WrestleMania.

During the 50 men-Greatest Royal Rumble in April 2018, the winner Braun Strowman received a trophy and the Greatest Royal Rumble Championship.

== Dates, venues, and winners ==
List of Royal Rumble dates, venues, and winners
Event	Date	City	Venue	Winner				Ref.
Event	Date	City	Venue	Men	No.	Women	No.	Ref.
Royal Rumble (1988)	January 24, 1988	Hamilton, Ontario, Canada	Copps Coliseum	Jim Duggan	13	—N/a		
Royal Rumble (1989)	January 15, 1989	Houston, Texas	The Summit	Big John Studd	27	—N/a		
Royal Rumble (1990)	January 21, 1990	Orlando, Florida	Orlando Arena	Hulk Hogan	25	—N/a		
Royal Rumble (1991)	January 19, 1991	Miami, Florida	Miami Arena	Hulk Hogan	24	—N/a		
Royal Rumble (1992)	January 19, 1992	Albany, New York	Knickerbocker Arena	Ric Flair	3	—N/a		
Royal Rumble (1993)	January 24, 1993	Sacramento, California	ARCO Arena	Yokozuna	27	—N/a		
Royal Rumble (1994)	January 22, 1994	Providence, Rhode Island	Providence Civic Center	Lex Luger	23	—N/a		
Royal Rumble (1994)	January 22, 1994	Providence, Rhode Island	Providence Civic Center	Bret Hart	27	—N/a		
Royal Rumble (1995)	January 22, 1995	Tampa, Florida	USF Sun Dome	Shawn Michaels	1	—N/a		
Royal Rumble (1996)	January 21, 1996	Fresno, California	Selland Arena	Shawn Michaels	18	—N/a		
Royal Rumble (1997)	January 19, 1997	San Antonio, Texas	Alamodome	"Stone Cold" Steve Austin	5	—N/a		
Royal Rumble (1998)	January 18, 1998	San Jose, California	San Jose Arena	"Stone Cold" Steve Austin	24	—N/a		
Royal Rumble (1999)	January 24, 1999	Anaheim, California	Arrowhead Pond of Anaheim	Mr. McMahon	2	—N/a		
Royal Rumble (2000)	January 23, 2000	New York City, New York	Madison Square Garden	The Rock	24	—N/a		
Royal Rumble (2001)	January 21, 2001	New Orleans, Louisiana	New Orleans Arena	"Stone Cold" Steve Austin	27	—N/a		
Royal Rumble (2002)	January 20, 2002	Atlanta, Georgia	Philips Arena	Triple H	22	—N/a		
Royal Rumble (2003)	January 19, 2003	Boston, Massachusetts	FleetCenter	Brock Lesnar	29	—N/a		
Royal Rumble (2004)	January 25, 2004	Philadelphia, Pennsylvania	Wachovia Center	Chris Benoit	1	—N/a		
Royal Rumble (2005)	January 30, 2005	Fresno, California	Save Mart Center	Batista	28	—N/a		
Royal Rumble (2006)	January 29, 2006	Miami, Florida	American Airlines Arena	Rey Mysterio	2	—N/a		
Royal Rumble (2007)	January 28, 2007	San Antonio, Texas	AT&T Center	The Undertaker	30	—N/a		
Royal Rumble (2008)	January 27, 2008	New York City, New York	Madison Square Garden	John Cena	30	—N/a		
Royal Rumble (2009)	January 25, 2009	Detroit, Michigan	Joe Louis Arena	Randy Orton	8	—N/a		
Royal Rumble (2010)	January 31, 2010	Atlanta, Georgia	Philips Arena	Edge	29	—N/a		
Royal Rumble (2011)	January 30, 2011	Boston, Massachusetts	TD Garden	Alberto Del Rio	38	—N/a		
Royal Rumble (2012)	January 29, 2012	St. Louis, Missouri	Scottrade Center	Sheamus	22	—N/a		
Royal Rumble (2013)	January 27, 2013	Phoenix, Arizona	US Airways Center	John Cena	19	—N/a		
Royal Rumble (2014)	January 26, 2014	Pittsburgh, Pennsylvania	Consol Energy Center	Batista	28	—N/a		
Royal Rumble (2015)	January 25, 2015	Philadelphia, Pennsylvania	Wells Fargo Center	Roman Reigns	19	—N/a		
Royal Rumble (2016)	January 24, 2016	Orlando, Florida	Amway Center	Triple H	30	—N/a		
Royal Rumble (2017)	January 29, 2017	San Antonio, Texas	Alamodome	Randy Orton	23	—N/a		
Royal Rumble (2018)	January 28, 2018	Philadelphia, Pennsylvania	Wells Fargo Center	Shinsuke Nakamura	14	Asuka	25	
Greatest Royal Rumble	April 27, 2018	Jeddah, Saudi Arabia	King Abdullah International Stadium	Braun Strowman	41	—N/a		
Royal Rumble (2019)	January 27, 2019	Phoenix, Arizona	Chase Field	Seth Rollins	10	Becky Lynch	28	
Royal Rumble (2020)	January 26, 2020	Houston, Texas	Minute Maid Park	Drew McIntyre	16	Charlotte Flair	17	
Royal Rumble (2021)	January 31, 2021	St. Petersburg, Florida	WWE ThunderDome at Tropicana Field	Edge	1	Bianca Belair	3	
Royal Rumble (2022)	January 29, 2022	St. Louis, Missouri	The Dome at America's Center	Brock Lesnar	30	Ronda Rousey	28	
Royal Rumble (2023)	January 28, 2023	San Antonio, Texas	Alamodome	Cody Rhodes	30	Rhea Ripley	1	
Royal Rumble (2024)	January 27, 2024	St. Petersburg, Florida	Tropicana Field	Cody Rhodes	15	Bayley	3	
Royal Rumble (2025)	February 1, 2025	Indianapolis, Indiana	Lucas Oil Stadium	Jey Uso	20	Charlotte Flair	27	
Royal Rumble (2026)	January 31, 2026	Riyadh, Saudi Arabia	Riyadh Season Stadium	Roman Reigns	26	Liv Morgan	14	

=== Men's Royal Rumble winner's championship opportunity ===
Championship	Victories	Attempts	Success rate
WWE Championship (Note: The WWE Championship has had various names due to company name changes and title unifications. Since the 1993 Royal Rumble, these include the WWF World Heavyweight Championship, the WWF Championship, the Undisputed WWF Championship, the WWE World Heavyweight Championship, the Undisputed WWE Universal Championship (in tandem with the WWE Universal Championship), and the Undisputed WWE Championship.)	11	20	.550
World Heavyweight Championship (2002–2013 version)	5	7	.714
WWE Universal Championship (Note: From April 2022 to April 2024, the WWE Championship and Universal Championship were held and defended together as the Undisputed WWE Universal Championship, thus both titles together were a singular choice as the Undisputed title.)	2	5	.400
World Heavyweight Championship (current version)	2	2	1.000
Total	18 (Note: At WrestleMania XL in 2024, the WWE Championship and WWE Universal Championship were originally won together as the Undisputed WWE Universal Championship. This is counted as one instead of two separate victories/attempts due to the Universal Championship being officially retired after WrestleMania XL and the WWE Championship going forward as the Undisputed WWE Championship.)	34	.529

– WrestleMania victory
– WrestleMania loss
– Did not receive title match

	Winner	Event	Year	Championship match
1	Yokozuna	WrestleMania IX	1993	Yokozuna defeated Bret Hart to win the WWF Championship, but lost it shortly afterwards to Hulk Hogan in a impromptu match.
2	Lex Luger	WrestleMania X	1994	Luger lost to WWF Champion Yokozuna by disqualification.
2	Bret Hart	WrestleMania X	1994	Hart defeated Yokozuna to win the WWF Championship.
3	Shawn Michaels	WrestleMania XI	1995	Michaels lost to WWF Champion Diesel.
4	Shawn Michaels	WrestleMania XII	1996	Michaels successfully defended his title shot against Owen Hart at In Your House 6. Michaels went on to defeat Bret Hart in a 60-minute Iron Man match to win the WWF Championship.
5	"Stone Cold" Steve Austin	WrestleMania 13	1997	Austin was declared the winner after eliminating Bret Hart. Hart had actually thrown Austin out of the ring moments earlier, but the officials at ringside were distracted and did not see it. WWF President Gorilla Monsoon refused to give Austin the WrestleMania title shot due to his actions; Austin and Hart, along with The Undertaker and Vader, would face off in an elimination match at In Your House 13: Final Four. The winner was originally to face the WWF Champion at WrestleMania, but Shawn Michaels relinquished the title just before the event; the match would instead be contested for the vacant WWF Championship, which was won by Hart. Hart would lose the championship to Sycho Sid the night after winning it; Sid would, in turn, lose the title to The Undertaker at WrestleMania.
6	"Stone Cold" Steve Austin	WrestleMania XIV	1998	Austin defeated Shawn Michaels to win the WWF Championship.
7	Mr. McMahon	WrestleMania XV	1999	The following night on Raw Is War, Mr. McMahon relinquished his opportunity to challenge for the WWF Championship at WrestleMania and promised to name a replacement challenger at his discretion. However, WWF Commissioner Shawn Michaels informed him that the rules stated that the runner-up in the Royal Rumble, in this case "Stone Cold" Steve Austin, would receive the title match in his stead. Austin defended his championship opportunity against McMahon at February's St. Valentine's Day Massacre: In Your House pay-per-view, then defeated The Rock in a no disqualification match at WrestleMania.
8	The Rock	WrestleMania 2000	2000	The Rock was initially declared the winner after last eliminating The Big Show. However, Big Show produced a video replay that showed Rock's feet touch the floor before his; after trading victories in matches for the WrestleMania title match against WWF Champion Triple H, it was decided initially that the three men would face off in a triple threat match for the title; this would lead to a fatal four way match at WrestleMania after Mick Foley was added to the match. Triple H won after last eliminating Rock.
9	"Stone Cold" Steve Austin	WrestleMania X-Seven	2001	Austin defeated The Rock in a No Disqualification match to win the WWF Championship.
10	Triple H	WrestleMania X8	2002	Triple H lost his WrestleMania X8 title shot to Kurt Angle at No Way Out. The following night on Raw, Triple H was given a rematch by WWF co-owner Ric Flair and defeated Angle to win his title shot back. Triple H went on to defeat Chris Jericho to win the Undisputed WWF Championship at WrestleMania X8.
11	Brock Lesnar	WrestleMania XIX	2003	As a member of the SmackDown! brand, Lesnar earned a match for his own brand's WWE Championship and defeated Kurt Angle to win the title; had Angle gotten counted out or disqualified, he would have lost the title per the stipulation.
12	Chris Benoit	WrestleMania XX	2004	Benoit won the Rumble as a SmackDown! wrestler, but switched to the Raw brand to challenge Triple H for the World Heavyweight Championship. Shawn Michaels, who was feuding with Triple H, later added himself to the match to make it a triple threat match. At WrestleMania XX, Benoit defeated Triple H and Michaels to win the title.
13	Batista	WrestleMania 21	2005	Batista from Raw chose to challenge for his own brand's World Heavyweight Championship and defeated Triple H to win the title.
14	Rey Mysterio	WrestleMania 22	2006	Mysterio from SmackDown! chose to challenge for his own brand's World Heavyweight Championship, but lost his title shot to Randy Orton at No Way Out. On the following episode of SmackDown!, General Manager Theodore Long re-added Mysterio to the World Heavyweight Championship match, making it a triple threat match. At WrestleMania 22, Mysterio defeated champion Kurt Angle and Orton to win the title.
15	The Undertaker	WrestleMania 23	2007	The Undertaker from SmackDown! chose to challenge for his own brand's World Heavyweight Championship and defeated Batista to win the title.
16	John Cena	No Way Out	2008	Instead of waiting until WrestleMania XXIV, Cena from Raw used his championship shot at No Way Out to challenge for his own brand's WWE Championship. Cena defeated champion Randy Orton by disqualification, thus Orton retained as titles do not change hands by disqualification unless stipulated. Cena would nevertheless challenge for the title at WrestleMania XXIV in a triple threat match also featuring Triple H, with Orton again retaining.
17	Randy Orton	WrestleMania 25	2009	Orton won the Rumble as a Raw wrestler, but chose to challenge for SmackDown's WWE Championship, but lost to Triple H; had Triple H gotten counted out or disqualified, he would have lost the title per the stipulation.
18	Edge	WrestleMania XXVI	2010	Edge from SmackDown chose to challenge for his own brand's World Heavyweight Championship, but lost to Chris Jericho.
19	Alberto Del Rio	WrestleMania XXVII	2011	Del Rio from SmackDown chose to challenge for his own brand's World Heavyweight Championship, but lost to Edge.
20	Sheamus	WrestleMania XXVIII	2012	Sheamus chose to challenge for the World Heavyweight Championship and defeated Daniel Bryan to win the title.
21	John Cena	WrestleMania 29	2013	Cena chose to challenge for the WWE Championship and successfully defended his title shot against CM Punk on the February 25 episode of Raw. At WrestleMania 29, Cena defeated The Rock to win the title.
22	Batista	WrestleMania XXX	2014	After months of feuding, Triple H agreed to face Daniel Bryan at WrestleMania XXX, with the stipulation that whoever won would be inserted into the WWE World Heavyweight Championship match between champion Randy Orton and Rumble winner Batista to make it a triple threat match. Bryan defeated Triple H in the opening match and went on to defeat Orton and Batista to win the WWE World Heavyweight Championship.
23	Roman Reigns	WrestleMania 31	2015	Reigns successfully defended his title shot against Daniel Bryan at Fastlane. At WrestleMania 31 during Reigns' match against champion Brock Lesnar, Seth Rollins cashed in his Money in the Bank contract, converting the singles match between Reigns and Lesnar into a triple threat match. Rollins then defeated Lesnar and Reigns in the impromptu triple threat match by pinning Reigns to win the WWE World Heavyweight Championship.
24	Randy Orton	WrestleMania 33	2017	As a member of the SmackDown brand, Orton earned a match for his own brand's WWE Championship. After his fellow Wyatt Family member Bray Wyatt won the championship at Elimination Chamber and retained it on the following SmackDown, Orton relinquished his championship opportunity. On the next episode of SmackDown, however, Orton reverted his decision and turned on Wyatt. The following week, Orton defeated AJ Styles, who had become the new number one contender for the title, to re-earn his title shot. At WrestleMania 33, Orton defeated Wyatt to win the title.
25	Shinsuke Nakamura	WrestleMania 34	2018	Nakamura from SmackDown chose to challenge for his own brand's WWE Championship, but lost to AJ Styles.
26	Seth Rollins	WrestleMania 35	2019	Rollins from Raw chose to challenge for his own brand's WWE Universal Championship and defeated Brock Lesnar to win the title.
27	Drew McIntyre	WrestleMania 36	2020	McIntyre from Raw chose to challenge for his own brand's WWE Championship and defeated Brock Lesnar to win the title.
28	Edge	WrestleMania 37	2021	Edge won as a free agent and chose to challenge for SmackDown's WWE Universal Championship. After a controversial finish in the main event of Fastlane, which saw champion Roman Reigns retain the title against Daniel Bryan in a match where Edge served as the special guest enforcer, a decision was made to add Bryan to the match at WrestleMania, making it a triple threat match. At WrestleMania 37, Reigns defeated Edge and Bryan to retain the Universal Championship.
29	Brock Lesnar	WrestleMania 38	2022	Lesnar, who came into the Royal Rumble event as Raw's WWE Champion and lost the title to Bobby Lashley, came back in the main event as the surprise #30 entrant in the Rumble match, won the Rumble, and chose to challenge for SmackDown's WWE Universal Championship. Lesnar would go on to win back the WWE Championship at Elimination Chamber in an Elimination Chamber match. It was then announced that the match between Lesnar and Universal Champion Roman Reigns at WrestleMania 38 would be a Winner Takes All match for both the WWE and Universal Championships. At WrestleMania 38, Lesnar lost to Reigns, with Reigns retaining his Universal Championship and winning Lesnar's WWE Championship, unifying the titles and subsequently becoming recognized as the Undisputed WWE Universal Champion.
30	Cody Rhodes	WrestleMania 39	2023	Rhodes won the Rumble as a Raw wrestler, but due to Roman Reigns simultaneously holding Raw's WWE Championship and SmackDown's WWE Universal Championship as the Undisputed WWE Universal Championship, Rhodes earned a match against Reigns for the Undisputed title. At WrestleMania 39, Rhodes lost to Reigns.
31	Cody Rhodes	WrestleMania XL	2024	Rhodes won the Rumble as a Raw wrestler, but chose to challenge for SmackDown's Undisputed WWE Universal Championship and defeated Roman Reigns in a Bloodline Rules match to win the title.
32	Jey Uso	WrestleMania 41	2025	Uso from Raw chose to challenge for his own brand's World Heavyweight Championship and defeated Gunther to win the title.
33	Roman Reigns	WrestleMania 42	2026	Reigns won the Rumble as a SmackDown wrestler, but chose to challenge for Raw's World Heavyweight Championship and defeated CM Punk to win the title.

=== Women's Royal Rumble winner's championship opportunity ===
Championship	Victories	Attempts	Success rate
Women's World Championship (formerly SmackDown Women's Championship)	2	4	.500
WWE Women's Championship (formerly Raw Women's Championship)	3	4	.750
NXT Women's Championship	1	1	1.000
Total	6	9	.667

– WrestleMania victory
– WrestleMania loss

	Winner	Event	Year	Championship match
1	Asuka	WrestleMania 34	2018	Asuka won the Rumble as a Raw wrestler, but chose to challenge for the SmackDown Women's Championship, but lost to Charlotte Flair.
2	Becky Lynch	WrestleMania 35	2019	Lynch won the Rumble as a SmackDown wrestler, but chose to challenge for the Raw Women's Championship. Lynch was removed from the match and suspended after continuously attacking the McMahon family and was replaced by Rumble runner-up, Charlotte Flair. At Fastlane, Lynch defeated Flair thanks to interference from champion Ronda Rousey, and as per the stipulation of that match, she was reinserted into the match at WrestleMania, making it a triple threat match. Flair then won the SmackDown Women's Championship on the March 26 episode of SmackDown, leading Stephanie McMahon to announce that both titles would be on the line in a Winner Takes All match. At WrestleMania 35, Lynch defeated Rousey and Flair to win both titles.
3	Charlotte Flair	WrestleMania 36	2020	Flair won the Rumble as a Raw wrestler, but chose to challenge for the NXT Women's Championship, and defeated Rhea Ripley to win the title.
4	Bianca Belair	WrestleMania 37	2021	Belair from SmackDown chose to challenge for her own brand's SmackDown Women's Championship, and defeated Sasha Banks to win the title.
5	Ronda Rousey	WrestleMania 38	2022	Rousey won as a free agent and chose to challenge for the SmackDown Women's Championship, but lost to Charlotte Flair.
6	Rhea Ripley	WrestleMania 39	2023	Ripley won the Rumble as a Raw wrestler, but chose to challenge for the SmackDown Women's Championship, and defeated Charlotte Flair to win the title.
7	Bayley	WrestleMania XL	2024	Bayley from SmackDown chose to challenge for her own brand's WWE Women's Championship, and defeated Iyo Sky to win the title.
8	Charlotte Flair	WrestleMania 41	2025	Flair from SmackDown chose to challenge for her own brand's WWE Women's Championship, but lost to Tiffany Stratton.
9	Liv Morgan	WrestleMania 42	2026	Morgan from Raw chose to challenge for her own brand's Women's World Championship, and defeated Stephanie Vaquer to win the title.

== Other Royal Rumble matches ==
List of Royal Rumble dates, venues, and winners
Event	Date	City	Venue	Winner	Ref.	Note
House show	October 4, 1987	St. Louis, Missouri	St. Louis Arena	One Man Gang		12-man Royal Rumble
House show	March 14, 1988	East Rutherford, New Jersey	Brendan Byrne Arena	Jake Roberts		22-man Royal Rumble
House show	March 16, 1988	Hartford, Connecticut	Hartford Civic Center	Rick Rude		22-man Royal Rumble
House show	January 17, 1994	New York City, New York	Madison Square Garden	Owen Hart		30-man Royal Rumble
House show	May 9, 1994	Osaka, Japan	Castle Hall	The Undertaker		18-man Royal Rumble
Raw	June 15, 1998	San Antonio, Texas	Freeman Coliseum	Kane and Mankind		10-tag team Royal Rumble
Raw	January 11, 1999	Houston, Texas	Compaq Center	Chyna		10-person Corporation vs. DX corporate Royal Rumble for the number 30 spot in the 1999 Royal Rumble
SmackDown	January 29, 2004	Washington, D.C.	MCI Center	Eddie Guerrero		15-man SmackDown! Royal Rumble to determine the number one contender for the WWE Championship at No Way Out
Raw	January 14, 2008	Mobile, Alabama	Mobile Civic Center	Hornswoggle		Mini Royal Rumble; 6-man, all participants were midget wrestlers, with the exception of The Great Khali.
SmackDown	2011	Cincinnati, Ohio	U.S. Bank Arena	Kofi Kingston		5-man Royal Rumble
Raw	2011	Providence, Rhode Island	Dunkin' Donuts Center	Jerry Lawler		7-man Raw Rumble to determine the number one contender for the WWE Championship at Elimination Chamber
House show	October 27, 2017	Sanford, Florida	Sanford Civic Center	Shayna Baszler		15-woman costumed Halloween Rumble
Royal Rumble	January 28, 2018	Philadelphia, Pennsylvania	Wells Fargo Center	Ric Flair (Note: AJ Styles won the SmackDown dark match; the end of the match was subsequently re-recorded for the advert prior to the Royal Rumble event.)		KFC Colonel Rumble (9-man)
House show	October 27, 2018	Orlando, Florida	Orlando Live Events	Stacey Ervin Jr.		20-man costumed Halloween Rumble
House show	October 31, 2019	Orlando, Florida	Orlando Live Events	Shayna Baszler		16-woman costumed Halloween Rumble
House show	October 31, 2019	Orlando, Florida	Orlando Live Events	Bronson Reed		13-man costumed Halloween Rumble
