= Royal Rumble (2008) =

World Wrestling Entertainment pay-per-view event

- Promotional poster featuring various WWE wrestlers brawling on the New York City Subway
- Promotion: World Wrestling Entertainment
- Brand(s): Raw; SmackDown; ECW
- Date: January 27, 2008
- City: New York City, New York
- Venue: Madison Square Garden
- Attendance: 20,798
- Buy rate: 575,000

Pay-per-view chronology
← Previous; Armageddon	Next → No Way Out

Royal Rumble chronology
← Previous; 2007	Next → 2009

The 2008 Royal Rumble was a professional wrestling pay-per-view (PPV) event produced by World Wrestling Entertainment (WWE), held for wrestlers from the promotion's Raw, SmackDown, and ECW brand divisions. It was the 21st annual Royal Rumble event and took place on January 27, 2008, from Madison Square Garden in the New York City borough of Manhattan, New York. This was the second Royal Rumble held at Madison Square Garden after 2000 and it was WWE's first pay-per-view broadcast in high definition.

The event was based around the men's Royal Rumble match, a modified 30-man battle royal in which the participants enter at timed intervals instead of all beginning in the ring at the same time and the winner received a world championship match at WrestleMania. For the 2008 event, the winner received their choice to challenge for either Raw's WWE Championship, SmackDown's World Heavyweight Championship, or the ECW Championship at WrestleMania XXIV.

Five professional wrestling matches were featured on the event's supercard. The main event was the 2008 Royal Rumble match, which featured wrestlers from all three brands. Raw's John Cena, the surprise 30th entrant returning from a torn pectoral muscle, won the match by last eliminating Raw's Triple H, the 29th entrant; instead of waiting until WrestleMania, Cena invoked his guaranteed championship match at the following month's No Way Out. The primary match on the Raw brand was Randy Orton versus Jeff Hardy for the WWE Championship, which Orton won to retain. The primary match on the SmackDown brand was Edge versus Rey Mysterio for the World Heavyweight Championship, which Edge won to retain. The featured matches on the undercard were Montel Vontavious Porter (MVP) versus Ric Flair in a Career Threatening match and John "Bradshaw" Layfield (JBL) versus Chris Jericho.

== Production ==
=== Background ===
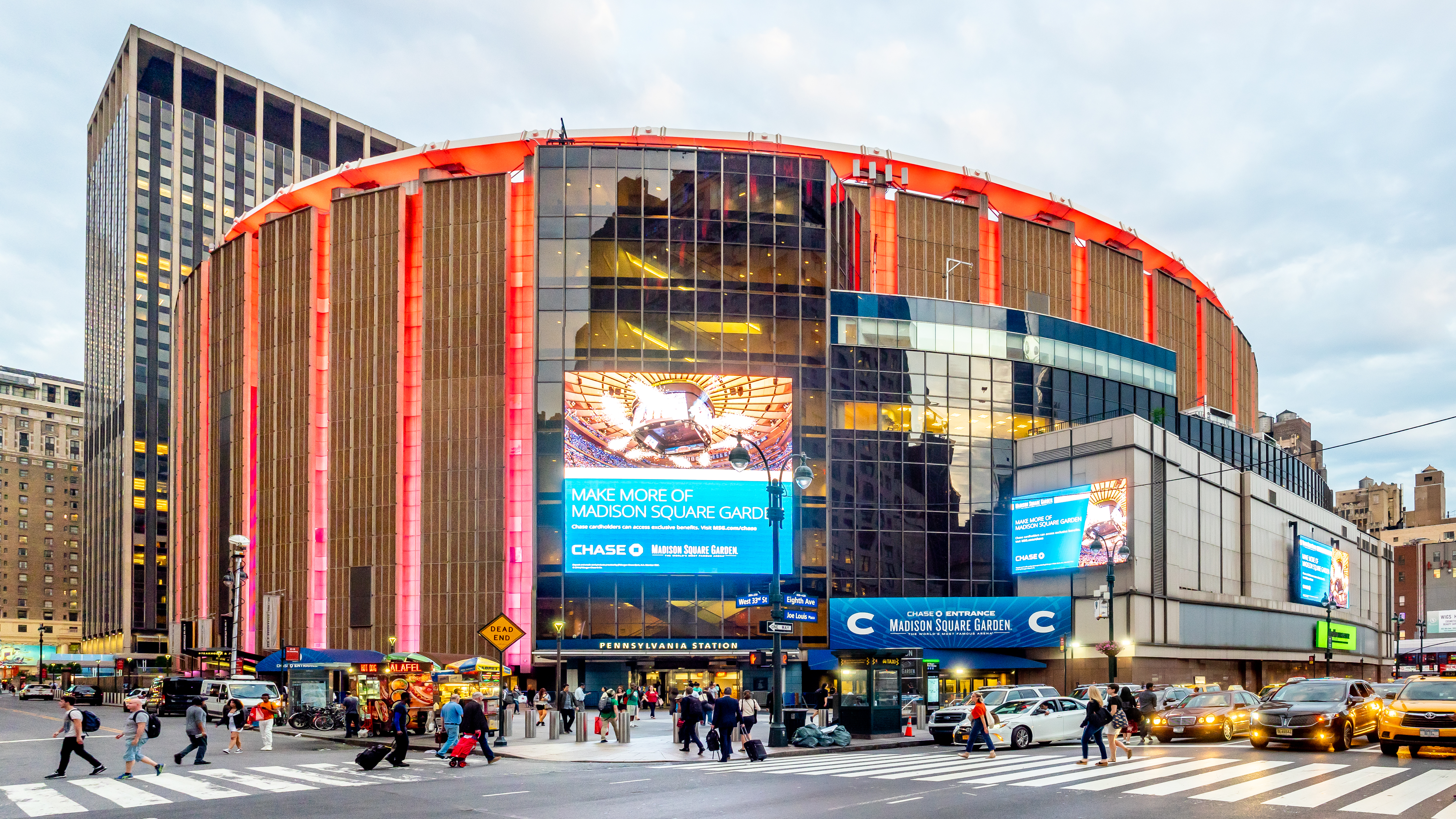
The 21st annual Royal Rumble was the second time for the event to be held at Madison Square Garden in New York City, New York, after 2000.

The Royal Rumble is an annual professional wrestling event, produced every January by World Wrestling Entertainment (WWE) since 1988; that first event was a television special before it became an annual pay-per-view (PPV) beginning in 1989. It is one of the promotion's original four pay-per-views, along with WrestleMania, SummerSlam, and Survivor Series, referred to as the "Big Four". It is named after and centered on the men's Royal Rumble match. The 21st Royal Rumble event was scheduled to be held on January 27, 2008, from Madison Square Garden in the New York City borough of Manhattan, New York and featured wrestlers from the Raw, SmackDown, and ECW brands. It was the second Royal Rumble held at Madison Square Garden after 2000. This was also WWE's first pay-per-view broadcast in high definition.

The Royal Rumble match is a modified battle royal in which the participants enter at timed intervals instead of all beginning in the ring at the same time, and the match generally features 30 wrestlers. Since 1993, the winner earns a world championship match at that year's WrestleMania. For 2008, the winner could choose to challenge for either Raw's WWE Championship, SmackDown's World Heavyweight Championship, or the ECW Championship at WrestleMania XXIV.

=== Storylines ===
The event comprised six matches, including one dark match, that resulted from scripted storylines. Results were predetermined by WWE's writers on the Raw, SmackDown, and ECW brands, while storylines were produced on WWE's television shows, Raw, SmackDown, and ECW on Sci Fi.

Prior to the annual Royal Rumble match, several qualifying matches for the match took place on Raw. The first qualifying match was on the December 31, 2007, episode as Umaga squashed Jim Duggan to earn a place in the Rumble. Snitsky also defeated Drew McIntyre at a house show in White Plains, New York to also qualify for the Royal Rumble. Triple H was disqualified against Ric Flair after interference from Raw general manager William Regal; therefore he was no longer allowed to compete in the Royal Rumble match, per the orders of Regal. After Triple H destroyed part of the lower TitanTron on the January 14 episode, however, Vince McMahon announced he would allow Triple H a second chance at the Royal Rumble if he could defeat his opponent on the January 21 episode. Triple H defeated Snitsky, Mark Henry, and Regal in a gauntlet match to gain entry.

Royal Rumble Qualification Matches

- Umaga defeated Jim Duggan – Raw, December 29 (aired December 31)
- Snitsky defeated Drew McIntyre – Raw house show, January 4
- Hardcore Holly defeated Trevor Murdoch – Raw house show, January 5
- John Morrison and the Miz defeated Jimmy Wang Yang and Shannon Moore – SmackDown/ECW house show, January 6
- Hornswoggle and Mick Foley defeated The Highlanders (Robbie and Rory McAllister) – Raw, January 7
- Jamie Noble defeated Chuck Palumbo – SmackDown, January 8 (aired January 11)
- Cody Rhodes defeated William Regal – Raw house show, January 11
- Carlito and Santino Marella defeated DH Smith and Super Crazy in a tag team match at a Raw house show, January 12
- Shelton Benjamin defeated Tommy Dreamer - Smackdown/ECW house show, January 12
- Shawn Michaels defeated Trevor Murdoch – Raw, January 14
- Triple H defeated Snitsky, Mark Henry, and William Regal in an Over the Top Rope Gauntlet match – Raw, January 21
- CM Punk defeated Chavo Guerrero – WWE supershow, January 26

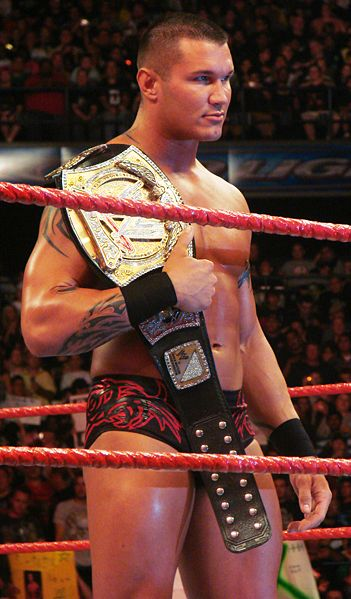
Randy Orton in his second reign as WWE Champion, which was Raw's world title at the time.

The main feud on the Raw brand was between the Intercontinental Champion Jeff Hardy and Randy Orton, with the two feuding over the WWE Championship, which was held by Orton. Orton retained the title at Armageddon against the returning Chris Jericho after being disqualified, when the then-SmackDown! broadcaster John "Bradshaw" Layfield (JBL) interfered and kicked Jericho in the head. Orton retained the championship, as a result, due to titles not changing hands on disqualifications. On the same night earlier, Jeff Hardy had defeated Triple H to earn the opportunity to face Orton at the Royal Rumble for the WWE Championship. The following night, on the December 17, 2007, episode of Raw, Hardy teamed up with Shawn Michaels to defeat Orton and Mr. Kennedy after Hardy pinned Orton. Two weeks later on the last Raw of 2007, Hardy and Orton had a face-to-face confrontation. Orton looked set to RKO Hardy, but Hardy countered and delivered a Twist of Fate to Orton. Later in the night, during Hardy's match with Santino Marella, Orton appeared on the Raw TitanTron and stated that he had kicked Jeff's brother Matt where his appendix used to be, proceeding further to punt him in the head. The following week on a special "Raw Roulette" edition of Raw, Hardy retained his Intercontinental Championship against Umaga in a Steel Cage match after performing a Whisper in the Wind from the top of the cage. On the January 14, 2008 edition of Raw, Hardy agreed to face Orton that night with his Intercontinental Championship on the line. However, as soon as the bell rang for the match, Orton immediately low-blowed Hardy, getting himself disqualified. Orton tried to deliver an RKO to Hardy on the concrete floor outside, but Hardy retaliated and the two began to brawl up the ramp. When Orton looked set to kick Hardy in the head, the Intercontinental Champion countered and back-dropped Orton onto the arena floor below. Hardy then climbed 30-feet above on the Raw set, and then Swanton Bombed off the side of the set onto Orton below. The following week on Raw, Hardy and Orton were scheduled to "shake hands", but Hardy instead shook the hands of "people he respected more than Orton", like Lilian Garcia, Jerry Lawler, Jim Ross, and several fans in the crowd before re-entering the ring to confront Orton. A frustrated Orton ordered Hardy to shake hands with him, but Hardy performed a Twist of Fate on the WWE Champion instead.

The main feud on the SmackDown brand was between Rey Mysterio and Edge with the two feuding over the latter's World Heavyweight Championship. Mysterio won a Beat the Clock Challenge on the January 4, 2008, episode of SmackDown! defeating Edge with 90 seconds to go, and securing an opportunity for the World Heavyweight Championship at the Royal Rumble.

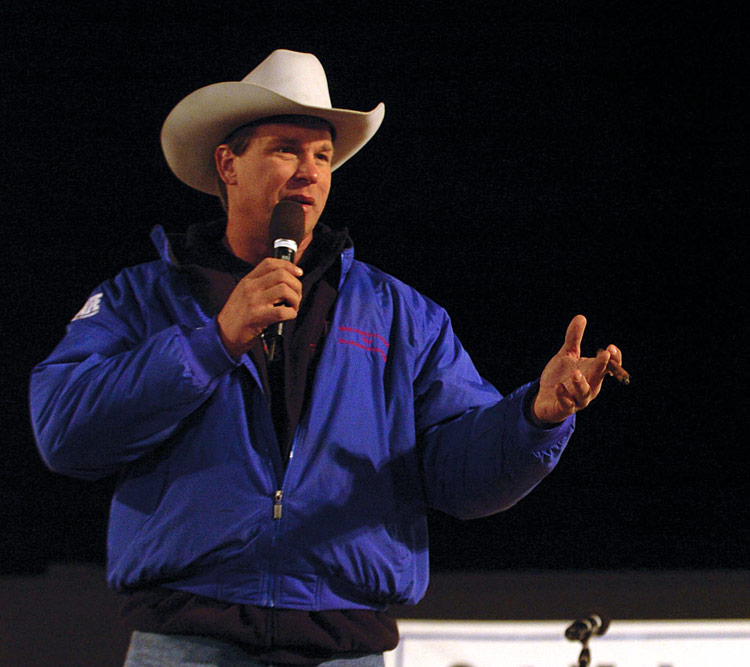
John "Bradshaw" Layfield (JBL), who faced off against Chris Jericho

The rivalry between Chris Jericho and John "Bradshaw" Layfield (JBL) started in Jericho's WWE Championship match against Randy Orton at Armageddon. During the match, Orton whipped Jericho over the SmackDown! announce table straight into JBL and when Jericho tried to get up, he "nudged" JBL out of his way. Later in the match, Jericho had Orton trapped in the Walls of Jericho, when JBL stormed into the ring and kicked Jericho in the head, thus giving the win to Jericho via disqualification, and hence, Jericho did not win the WWE Championship. This led to an argument the next night on Raw, where Jericho ended up stating to JBL, who appeared via satellite from the Raw TitanTron, that he was no longer a "wrestling god", but a "wrestling afterthought". Afterward, JBL gave his farewell address as SmackDown! color commentator on the December 21, 2007, airing of SmackDown! and announced his return as an active wrestler on Raw. JBL made his return to Raw on December 31, entering in his personal limousine with balloons and confetti shooting from the ceiling, and proceeded to address the crowd, Jericho quickly interrupted his promo and the two brawled until officials separated them. The following week, Jericho was put into a handicap match against Snitsky and JBL, which ended with JBL hitting Jericho in the head with the ring bell, resulting in a disqualification. He then tied a cable wire around Jericho's neck and dragged Jericho, by the wire, from near the ring to the Raw set, where he assaulted him some more. Jericho suffered from a bruised larynx, burns around his neck, and had difficulty speaking for a week.

== Event ==
Other on-screen personnel
Role:	Name:
English commentators	Jim Ross (Raw)
English commentators	Jerry Lawler (Raw)
English commentators	Michael Cole (SmackDown)
English commentators	Jonathan Coachman (SmackDown)
English commentators	Joey Styles (ECW)
English commentators	Tazz (ECW)
Spanish commentators	Carlos Cabrera
Spanish commentators	Hugo Savinovich
Interviewer	Mike Adamle
Ring announcers	Lilian Garcia (Raw)
Ring announcers	Justin Roberts (SmackDown)
Ring announcers	Michael Buffer (Royal Rumble Match)
Referees	Charles Robinson
Referees	Mike Chioda
Referees	Mickie Henson
Referees	Mike Posey
Referees	Jack Doan
Referees	Jim Korderas
Referees	Chad Patton
Referees	Marty Elias
Referees	Scott Armstrong

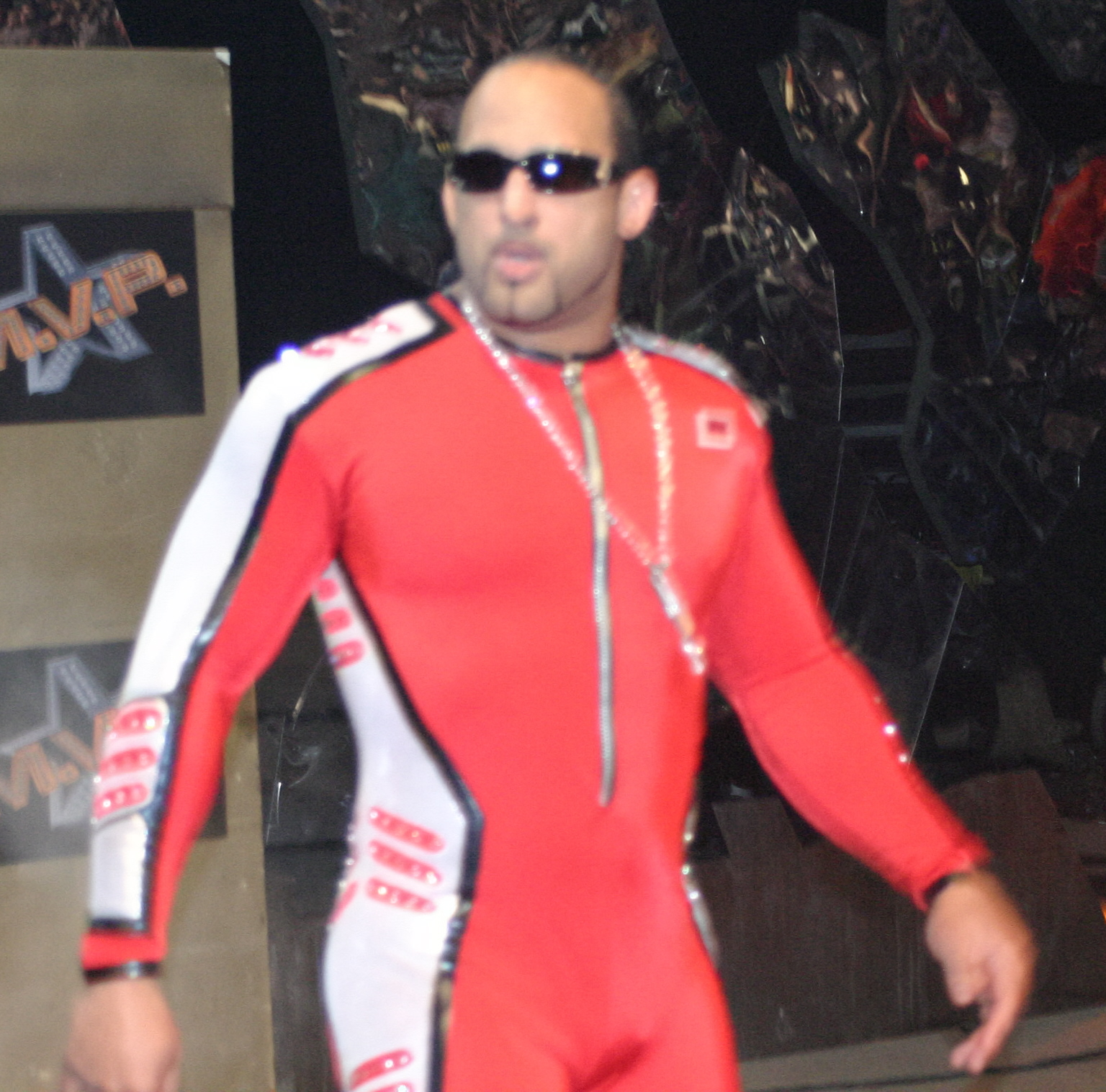
Montel Vontavious Porter (MVP) faced off against Ric Flair

Before the event went live on pay-per-view, Shannon Moore and Jimmy Wang Yang defeated Deuce 'n Domino in a dark match. The first match that aired was a non-title "Career Threatening" match between WWE United States Champion Montel Vontavious Porter (MVP) and Ric Flair, in which had Flair lost, he would have had to retire from wrestling. At the start of the match, Flair started out working on MVP's left arm. Flair attempted to get the figure-four leglock on MVP, but MVP turned it into a small package for a two count. MVP executed a running big boot on Flair in the corner and went for a pin, but Flair managed to get his foot on the rope when the referee Charles Robinson counted to three. After the three count, the referee did not call for the bell as he had noticed Flair's leg on the bottom-rope and restarted the match. The match ended when MVP attempted a Playmaker, but Flair countered the attempt into the figure-four leglock, to which MVP eventually tapped out. Hence, Flair won and kept his career alive.

The second match was between John "Bradshaw" Layfield (JBL) and Chris Jericho. The match began with Jericho trapping Layfield in the Walls of Jericho. JBL got to the ropes, however, and slid out of the ring with Jericho quickly following him. JBL strangled Jericho with the ring ropes and later, plunged him onto the ropes. Jericho recovered and clotheslined JBL out of the ring. When they got in again, JBL threw Jericho into the ring post, as a result of which, Jericho was busted open. JBL tried to take advantage of this situation, but Jericho still fought back. The fight went outside the ring, where JBL began clearing the ECW announce table. Jericho grabbed a steel chair and hit JBL with it. The referee immediately disqualified Jericho, who ignored the fact that he had lost the match and started to strangle JBL with some wires by the ring, in the same process JBL did to Jericho on Raw.

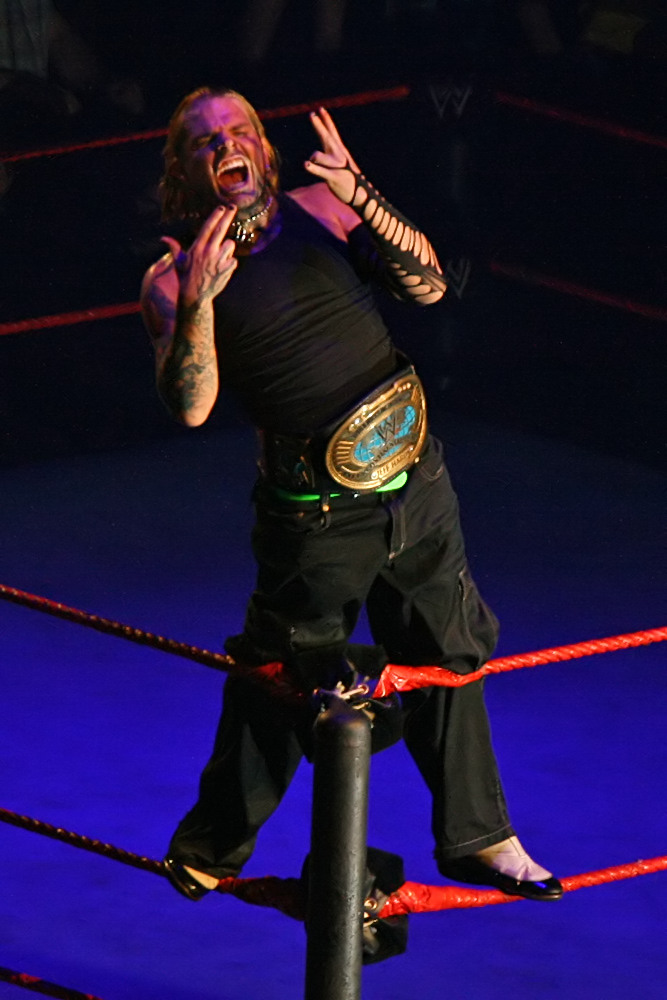
Jeff Hardy faced Randy Orton for Raw's WWE Championship at the Royal Rumble.

The third match was for the World Heavyweight Championship with champion, Edge taking on Rey Mysterio. During the match, Vickie Guerrero stood up from her wheelchair, attempting to comfort Edge. Mysterio had Edge set up for the 619, and Vickie jumped in the way, risking herself. Edge then recovered, and speared Mysterio in mid-air for the pinfall.

The fourth match was between the Intercontinental Champion Jeff Hardy and Randy Orton for Orton's WWE Championship. Early in the match, Hardy performed a baseball slide on Orton who hit head-first into the barricade outside due to the impact. Knowing he couldn't win the WWE Championship via a countout victory, Hardy brought the knocked-out Orton into the ring. Later, Orton took advantage in the match, as he applied a body scissors on Hardy, followed by a choke-hold. Some of the other main highlights of the match were Hardy performing a Whisper in the Wind on Orton; and, later executing a moonsault from the top-rope to Orton outside the ring. When Hardy brought Orton back in the ring and tried to deliver a Twist of Fate, Orton suddenly reversed it into an RKO and pinned Hardy to retain his WWE title.

=== Main event ===
The main event was the annual Royal Rumble match for a world championship match at WrestleMania XXIV; for the match, WWE was able to get Michael Buffer as a special guest ring announcer. The match began with The Undertaker and Shawn Michaels, who were the final two superstars in the previous year's Royal Rumble match. The Undertaker and Michaels would both last over thirty minutes until Michaels eliminated The Undertaker, only to be eliminated himself by Mr. Kennedy. Batista entered at number eight and would last the longest in the match at almost forty minutes. Hall of Famers Jimmy Snuka and Roddy Piper were both surprise entrants during the match, but both were eliminated by Kane. Hornswoggle, the ninth entrant, stayed hidden under the ring throughout most of the match (emerging once to help eliminate The Miz, the sixteenth entrant), however he was soon grabbed by Mark Henry and Big Daddy V, prompting Finlay to come out early and attack the two with his shillelagh. Finlay was disqualified for failing to wait for his entry number to be called and he left with Hornswoggle, who never returned. Triple H came out at number twenty-nine and scored the most eliminations with six. Afterwards, John Cena entered as the surprise thirtieth entrant, returning from a torn pectoral muscle injury months before his scheduled return. The ring soon cleared out and the final three came down to Batista, Triple H, and Cena. The three would go back and forth trying to eliminate each other until Cena reversed a Batista Bomb attempt which allowed Triple H to eliminate Batista. Triple H and Cena were left as the final two and they traded moves for almost five minutes. The end came when Triple H attempted a Pedigree on Cena, but Cena reversed it and lifted Triple H up for an Attitude Adjustment, which he used to send Triple H over the top rope to eliminate him and win the match, earning the WrestleMania title shot. With this victory, Cena broke the record for spending the least amount of time in the rumble match before winning it, beating Brock Lesnar's 8:59 time by 31 seconds.

== Aftermath ==
The next night on Raw, John Cena said that he did not want to wait until WrestleMania XXIV to face Randy Orton. The two agreed to face each other at No Way Out for the WWE Championship. In the match, Cena won after Orton intentionally got himself disqualified. As a result, Orton retained the title. At No Way Out, Triple H won Raw's Elimination Chamber match by last pinning Jeff Hardy after a Pedigree on a steel chair, earning the right to face Randy Orton for the WWE Championship at WrestleMania XXIV. At WrestleMania XXIV, Randy Orton retained the WWE Championship against Triple H and John Cena in a triple threat match.

Rey Mysterio received a rematch against Edge for the World Heavyweight Championship at No Way Out. Edge defeated Mysterio, who had suffered a biceps injury prior to the match. The Undertaker also won SmackDown's Elimination Chamber by pinning Batista last after a Tombstone piledriver and earned the right to face Edge at WrestleMania XXIV. The Undertaker won the World Heavyweight title from Edge at WrestleMania XXIV via Submission using the Hell's Gate.

The Ric Flair retirement storyline continued as Flair defeated Montel Vontavious Porter (MVP) that same week on SmackDown in a rematch, which he won by disqualification. He then faced Mr. Kennedy at No Way Out, defeating Kennedy to further extend his wrestling career. At WrestleMania XXIV, Flair lost to Shawn Michaels, ending Flair's career.

During the 2008 WWE Draft, the WWE Championship and World Heavyweight Championship switched brands.

== Results ==
No.	Results	Stipulations	Times
1^{D}	Jimmy Wang Yang and Shannon Moore defeated Deuce 'n Domino	Tag team match	—
2	Ric Flair defeated Montel Vontavious Porter by submission	Career Threatening match If Flair had lost, he would have been forced to retire from in-ring competition.	7:48
3	John "Bradshaw" Layfield defeated Chris Jericho by disqualification	Singles match	9:23
4	Edge (c) (with Vickie Guerrero) defeated Rey Mysterio by pinfall	Singles match for the World Heavyweight Championship	12:34
5	Randy Orton (c) defeated Jeff Hardy by pinfall	Singles match for the WWE Championship	14:03
6	John Cena won by last eliminating Triple H	30-man Royal Rumble match for a world championship match at WrestleMania XXIV	51:26
(c) / – the champion(s) heading into the match; D / – this was a dark match

=== Royal Rumble entrances and eliminations ===
– Raw
– SmackDown
– ECW
– Hall of Famer (HOF)
– Winner

Draw	Entrant	Brand/ Status	Order eliminated	Eliminated by	Time	Eliminations
1	The Undertaker	SmackDown	11	Shawn Michaels	32:33	3
2	Shawn Michaels	Raw	12	Mr. Kennedy	32:39	2
3	Santino Marella	Raw	1	The Undertaker	00:25	0
4	The Great Khali	SmackDown	2	The Undertaker	01:09	0
5	Hardcore Holly	Raw	6	Umaga	13:46	0
6	John Morrison	ECW	14	Kane	29:23	0
7	Tommy Dreamer	ECW	3	Batista	02:09	0
8	Batista	SmackDown	28	Triple H	37:46	4
9	Hornswoggle	SmackDown	16	Never re-entered match	26:17	1
10	Chuck Palumbo	SmackDown	5	CM Punk	04:00	1
11	Jamie Noble	SmackDown	4	Chuck Palumbo	00:28	0
12	CM Punk	ECW	17	Chavo Guerrero	23:50	1
13	Cody Rhodes	Raw	18	Triple H	23:14	0
14	Umaga	Raw	26	Batista	26:05	1
15	Snitsky	Raw	10	The Undertaker	12:26	0
16	The Miz	ECW	13	Hornswoggle	13:07	0
17	Shelton Benjamin	ECW	7	Shawn Michaels	00:18	0
18	Jimmy Snuka	HOF	9	Kane	02:43	0
19	Roddy Piper	HOF	8	Kane	01:00	0
20	Kane	SmackDown	27	Batista & Triple H	17:58	3
21	Carlito	Raw	22	John Cena	15:07	0
22	Mick Foley	Raw	20	Triple H	11:29	0
23	Mr. Kennedy	Raw	25	Batista	13:32	1
24	Big Daddy V	ECW	19	Triple H	07:49	0
25	Mark Henry	SmackDown	24	John Cena	09:12	0
26	Chavo Guerrero	ECW	23	John Cena	07:33	1
27	Finlay	SmackDown	15	Himself	00:00	0
28	Elijah Burke	ECW	21	Triple H	02:11	0
29	Triple H	Raw	29	John Cena	11:22	6
30	John Cena	Raw	—	Winner	08:28	4

Hornswoggle spent most of the match under the ring before being forced into the ring by Mark Henry, who would then team up with Big Daddy V to assault him. Finlay, who was supposed to be the next scheduled entrant, came out early and attacked them both with his shillelagh and was immediately disqualified. He left the ring with Hornswoggle, who left through the ropes and never returned.
