= No Way Out (2008) =

World Wrestling Entertainment pay-per-view event

- Promotional poster featuring Jeff Hardy and the Elimination Chamber structure
- Promotion: World Wrestling Entertainment
- Brand(s): Raw; SmackDown; ECW
- Date: February 17, 2008
- City: Paradise, Nevada
- Venue: Thomas & Mack Center
- Attendance: 15,240
- Buy rate: 329,000

Pay-per-view chronology
← Previous; Royal Rumble	Next → WrestleMania XXIV

No Way Out chronology
← Previous; 2007	Next → 2009

The 2008 No Way Out was a professional wrestling pay-per-view (PPV) event produced by World Wrestling Entertainment (WWE). It was the 10th No Way Out and took place on February 17, 2008, at the Thomas & Mack Center in Paradise, Nevada in the Las Vegas area, held for wrestlers from the promotion's Raw, SmackDown, and ECW brand divisions. This was the first No Way Out since 2003 to feature multiple brands after WWE discontinued brand-exclusive PPVs following WrestleMania 23 in April 2007, also making it the first No Way Out to feature ECW, which was introduced as a third brand in May 2006.

The main match on the Raw brand was an Elimination Chamber match to determine the number one contender for the WWE Championship at WrestleMania XXIV. Triple H won the match after last eliminating Jeff Hardy. The predominant match on the SmackDown brand was Edge versus Rey Mysterio for the World Heavyweight Championship, in which Edge won after spearing Mysterio in mid-air. The primary match on the ECW brand was Chavo Guerrero Jr. versus CM Punk for the ECW Championship. Guerrero won the match and retained the title after pinning Punk following a frog splash. The predominant match on the Raw brand was Randy Orton versus John Cena for the WWE Championship, which Cena won after Orton disqualified himself; this was Cena's championship match for winning the previous month's Royal Rumble match, which was supposed to be at WrestleMania XXIV but he decided to use it at this event. The featured match on the undercard was an Elimination Chamber match to determine the number one contender to the World Heavyweight Championship at WrestleMania XXIV, which was won by The Undertaker. No Way Out marked the WWE return of Big Show, who left the company in February 2007, and an appearance by professional boxer Floyd Mayweather, Jr.

Presented by THQ's Frontlines: Fuel of War, the event had 329,000 buys, up on the 2007 figure of 218,000 buys.

== Production ==
=== Background ===
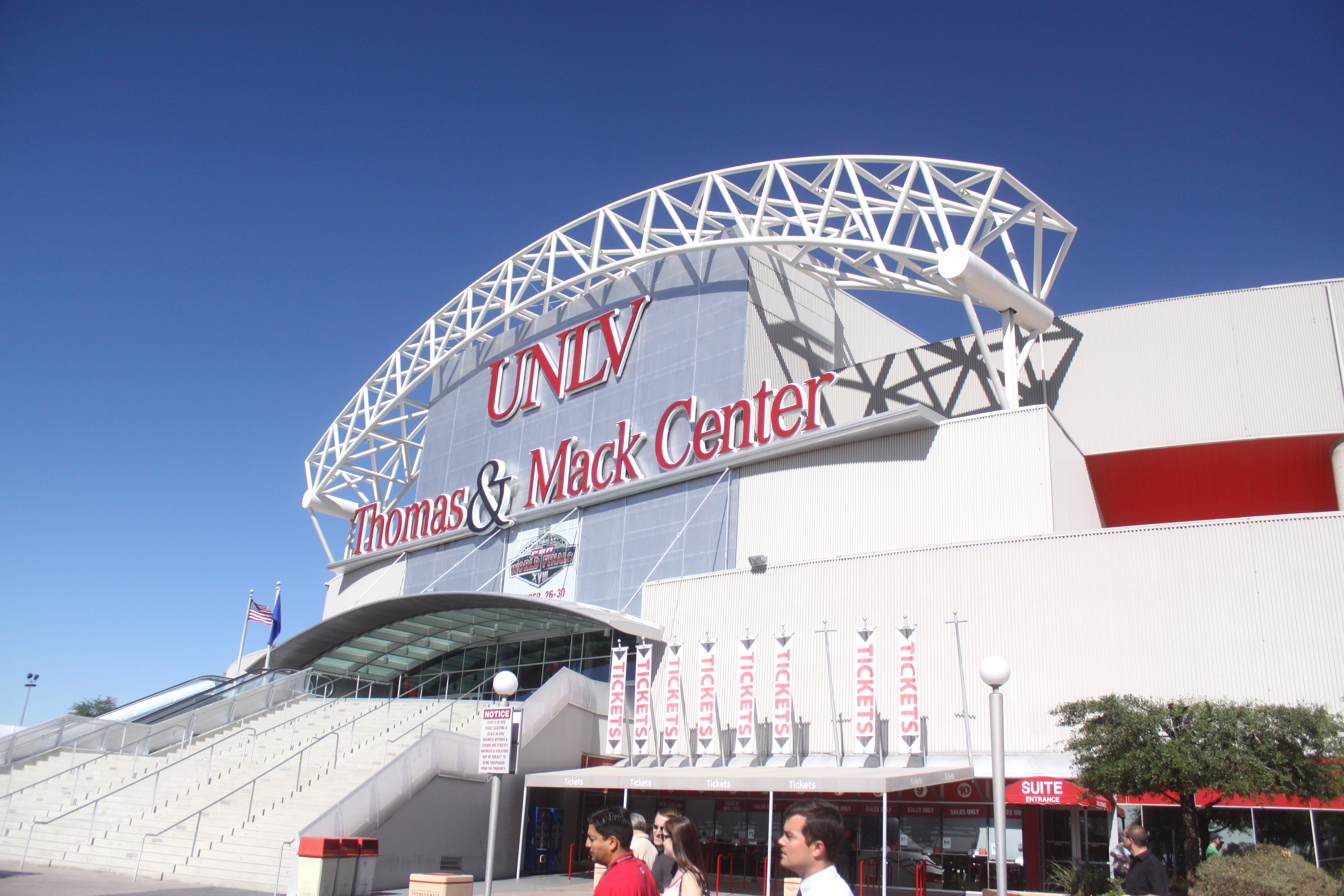
The 10th No Way Out was held at the Thomas & Mack Center in Paradise, Nevada in the Las Vegas area.

No Way Out was a professional wrestling pay-per-view (PPV) event first held by World Wrestling Entertainment (WWE) as the 20th In Your House PPV event in February 1998. Following the discontinuation of the In Your House series in February 1999, No Way Out was reinstated in February 2000 as its own PPV event, thus establishing it as the annual February PPV for the promotion. The 10th event was held on February 17, 2008, at the Thomas & Mack Center in Paradise, Nevada in the Las Vegas area. Tickets went on sale on December 15.

While the previous four years's events featured wrestlers exclusively from the SmackDown brand, the 2008 event featured wrestlers from the Raw, SmackDown, and ECW brands, as following WrestleMania 23 in April 2007, brand-exclusive pay-per-views were discontinued. As a result, this was the first No Way Out since 2003 to feature multiple brands as well as the first to feature ECW, which was introduced as a third brand in May 2006.

=== Storylines ===
The event featured six matches that resulted from scripted storylines. Results were predetermined by WWE's writers, on the Raw, SmackDown, and ECW brands, while storylines were produced on WWE's weekly television shows, Raw, SmackDown, and ECW on Sci Fi.

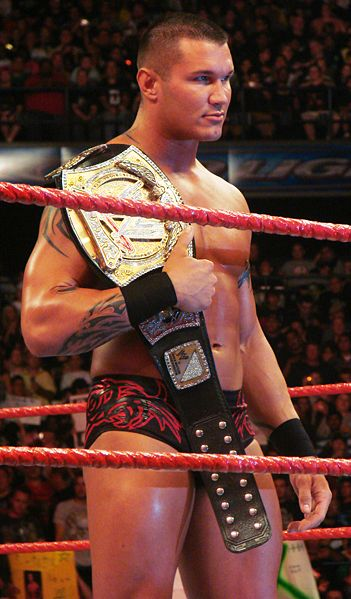
Randy Orton as Raw's WWE Champion

The main feud on the Raw brand heading into No Way Out was between Randy Orton and John Cena, with the two battling over the WWE Championship. At the Royal Rumble, Cena made a surprise return, entering as the 30th participant in the Royal Rumble match. Cena won the match after last eliminating Triple H, earning a world championship match of his choice at WrestleMania XXIV. The following night on Raw, Cena told Orton that he could not wait until WrestleMania and decided to cash in his title opportunity to challenge Orton for the WWE Championship at No Way Out, which Orton accepted.

The main feud on the SmackDown brand was between Rey Mysterio and Edge, with the two battling over the World Heavyweight Championship. Mysterio won a Beat the Clock Challenge on the January 4 episode of SmackDown!, defeating Edge with 90 seconds to go, to earn a title shot at the Royal Rumble. At the Royal Rumble, Edge retained the title after his on-screen lover, SmackDown general manager Vickie Guerrero, interfered by receiving an attack for Edge by Mysterio. On the February 1 episode of SmackDown, Theodore Long, who was acting as the General Manager due to Guerrero's scripted injury, assigned a rematch between the two at No Way Out. Mysterio was injured at a live event overseas on February 13, but still chose to compete in his match.

The main feud on the ECW brand was between CM Punk and Chavo Guerrero, with the two battling over the ECW Championship. On the January 22 episode of ECW, Guerrero defeated Punk to win the title after Edge interfered. The following week on ECW, while Guerrero was celebrating his victory, Punk, disguised as a mariachi, hit Guerrero with his guitar during Guerrero's championship celebration. On the February 5 episode of ECW, Punk demanded a rematch against Guerrero for the title, which Guerrero accepted the challenge for No Way Out. On the same night, ECW general manager Armando Estrada scheduled the first-ever Gulf of Mexico match, in which Punk defeated Guerrero by throwing him into the Gulf of Mexico.

Other matches on the Raw brand included an Elimination Chamber match, where the winner would receive a WWE Championship match at WrestleMania XXIV, and a "Career Threatening" match between Mr. Kennedy and Ric Flair, where Flair would be forced to retire from wrestling if he lost. The other match on the SmackDown brand was another Elimination Chamber match, where the winner would receive a World Heavyweight Championship match at WrestleMania XXIV

== Event ==
Other on-screen personnel
Role:	Name:
English commentators	Jim Ross (Raw)
English commentators	Jerry Lawler (Raw)
English commentators	Michael Cole (SmackDown)
English commentators	Jonathan Coachman (SmackDown)
English commentators	Joey Styles (ECW)
English commentators	Tazz (ECW)
Spanish commentators	Carlos Cabrera
Spanish commentators	Hugo Savinovich
Interviewer	Mike Adamle
Ring announcers	Lilian Garcia (Raw)
Ring announcers	Justin Roberts (SmackDown)
Ring announcers	Tony Chimel (ECW)
Referees	Charles Robinson
Referees	Mike Chioda
Referees	Mickie Henson
Referees	Nick Patrick
Referees	Mike Posey
Referees	Jim Korderas
Referees	Chad Patton
Referees	Marty Elias
Referees	Jack Doan
Referees	Scott Armstrong

Before the event aired on pay-per-view, Kane defeated Shelton Benjamin by pinfall, after delivering a chokeslam. The first match that aired was the ECW Championship match between CM Punk and the champion, Chavo Guerrero. In the beginning, the two wrestlers exchanged control of the match until late into the match, where Punk kicked Guerrero's head, causing him to fall from the ring apron to the outside. Back in the ring, Punk set Guerrero up for a Hurracarana from the top turnbuckle, but Guerrero countered the attempt by holding the ropes, causing Punk to fall to the ring mat. Guerrero immediately executed a Frog splash, and pinned Punk to retain his title.

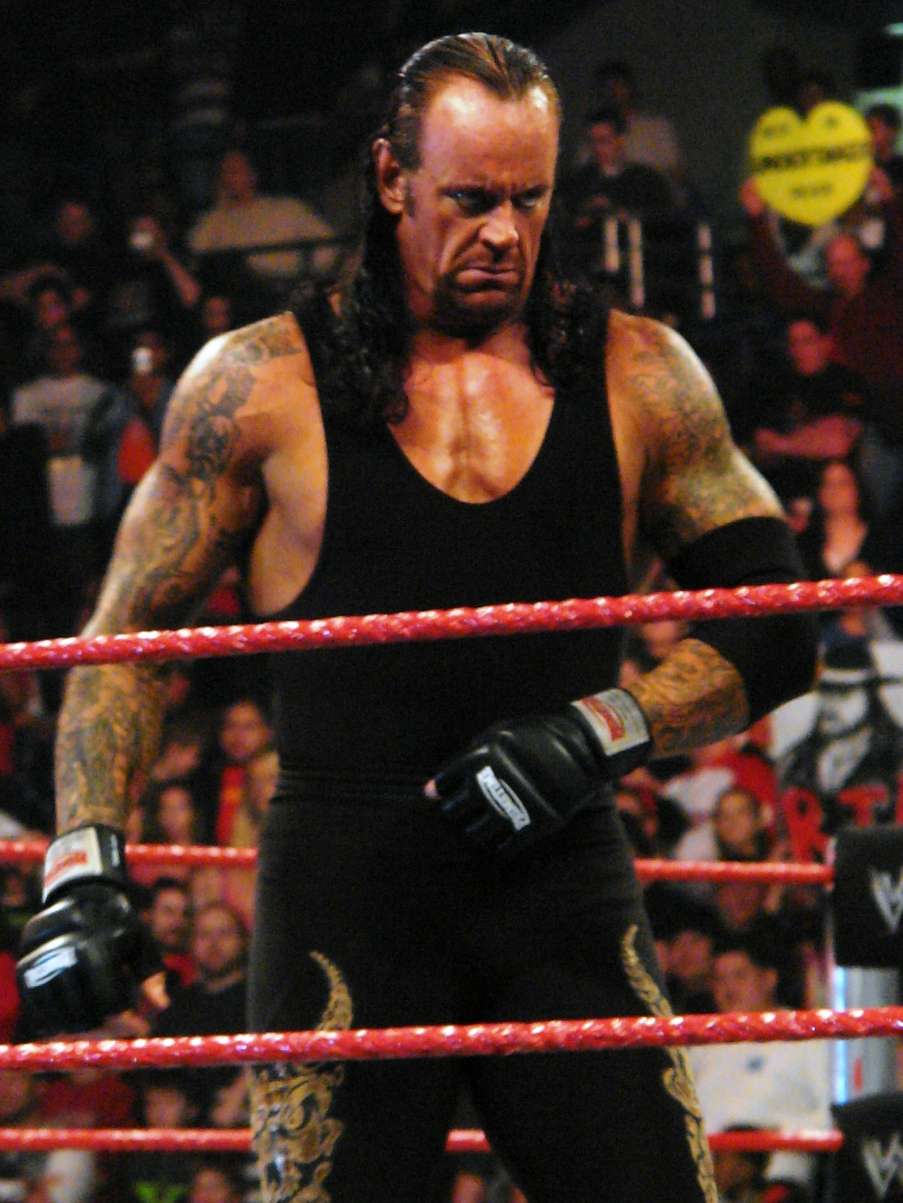
The Undertaker won SmackDown's Elimination Chamber match

The next match was the SmackDown/ECW Elimination Chamber match between The Undertaker, Batista, Big Daddy V (with Matt Striker), Finlay, The Great Khali (with Ranjin Singh), and Montel Vontavious Porter (MVP). Batista and The Undertaker were selected to start the match. The Undertaker gained control of the match early after tossing Batista over the top rope onto the chamber's steel surface. In the ring, both men were knocked down by delivering a big boot to each other. The third entrant, Big Daddy V, then entered, and dominated both The Undertaker and Batista for some time, until Batista performed a Spinebuster on Big Daddy V. Shortly after, The Undertaker executed a DDT on the steel floor of the chamber on Big Daddy V and Batista pinned him, thus eliminating him. The fourth entrant was The Great Khali, who also dominated upon entering, but was eliminated when he submitted to the Gogoplata submission hold. The fifth entrant was Finlay, who gained the advantage over Batista by tossing him into the steel chains of the chamber, and over Undertaker by delivering a Celtic Cross to him for a near-fall. Finlay also slammed The Undertaker's head into a pod, breaking it. The sixth entrant, MVP, was attacked by The Undertaker when his pod was opened. MVP used a steel chain as a weapon on the other three competitors, causing The Undertaker to start bleeding, until he climbed to the top of a pod. The Undertaker followed and delivered a chokeslam to MVP from the top of the pod onto the ring, which cost MVP the match as Finlay pinned MVP and eliminated him. Later, Hornswoggle passed a shillelagh to Finlay from under the ring, which he used on both Batista and The Undertaker, busting Batista's head open. He was soon eliminated by The Undertaker who pinned him after a Chokeslam onto the chamber floor. The final two men were Batista and The Undertaker. Batista gained advantage after delivering a Batista Bomb, but The Undertaker kicked out, which led to Batista tossing Undertaker into the chamber wall. The Undertaker however, retaliated and countered a powerslam attempt on the outside, bringing both men in, and delivered a Tombstone piledriver and pinned Batista, winning the match and earning a World Heavyweight Championship match at WrestleMania XXIV.

The third match was a "Career threatening" match between Ric Flair and Mr. Kennedy. In this match, had Flair lost, he would have had to retire from professional wrestling. Throughout the match Kennedy worked on Flair's injured leg, but in the end, Flair was able to trip Kennedy into a Figure four leglock, forcing Kennedy to submit. Thus, Flair won the match and avoided retirement.

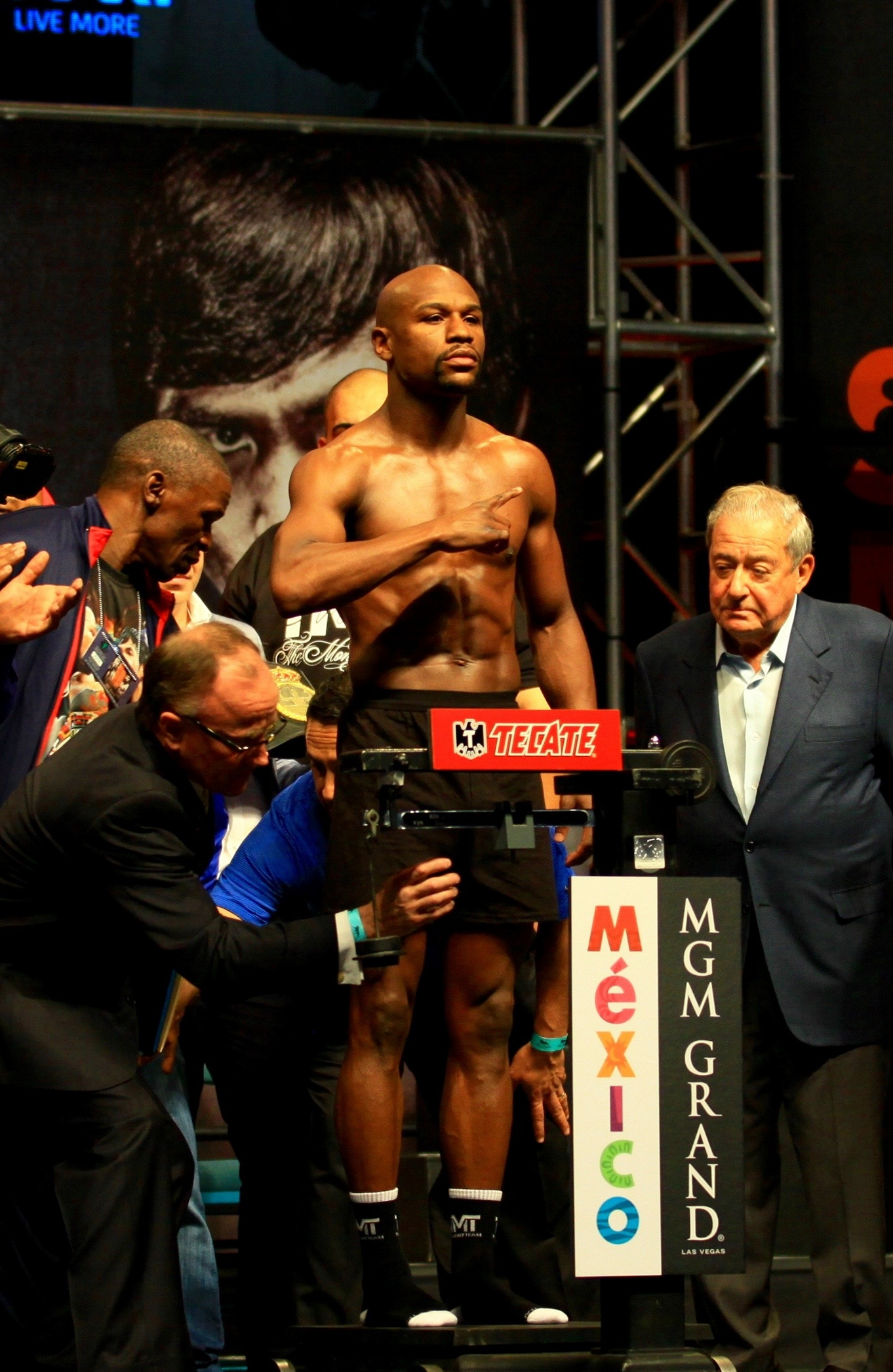
Boxer Floyd Mayweather, Jr. appeared at the event and knocked out Big Show.

The next match saw Edge defending the World Heavyweight Championship against Rey Mysterio. The stipulation was that Curt Hawkins and Zack Ryder were banned from ringside. Throughout the match, Edge worked on Mysterio's injured biceps, affecting Mysterio's offense. However, Mysterio retaliated, delivering a Tornado DDT on Edge for an unsuccessful pin attempt. Later in the match, Mysterio executed a 619 on Edge, but couldn't capitalize due to his biceps. He then attempted a Springboard Splash, but Edge speared Mysterio in mid-air, and pinned him, retaining the title. After the match, Big Show made a surprise return to WWE, where he cut a promo on his recent weight loss (over 108 pounds) and future plans of becoming a champion again. After doing so, Big Show began taunting professional boxer Floyd Mayweather Jr., who was in attendance and Mysterio's close friend. As Big Show threatened to chokeslam Mysterio, Mayweather jumped over the security wall and entered the ring to confront Big Show. Show then got on his knees to allow Mayweather to punch him, which Mayweather did with a combination of punches, bloodying Big Show from the nose and mouth. Mayweather and his crew fled the ring, and then through the crowd, where Shane McMahon stopped Big Show from chasing them.

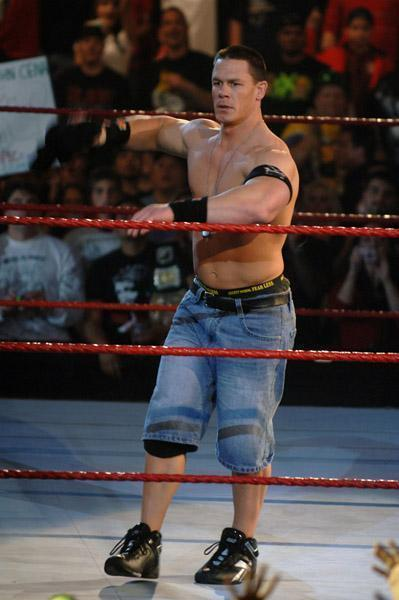
John Cena challenged Randy Orton for Raw's WWE Championship

The next match saw Randy Orton defend the WWE Championship against John Cena. The match started slow, with the men trading dominance. After a submission attempt by Cena, Orton feigned an injury outside the ring and ordered the referee Mike Chioda to count him out. When Cena came to check Orton's "injury", Orton delivered an RKO to Cena outside the ring. Orton got back in the ring and the referee started to count Cena out. Cena got back into the ring on a nine-count, but Orton purposely slapped the referee in the face and got himself disqualified. As a result, Orton lost the match but retained the title. After the match, Cena delivered an FU to Orton, and applied the STFU.

The main event was between Triple H, Shawn Michaels, Jeff Hardy, Chris Jericho, John "Bradshaw" Layfield (JBL), and Umaga in the second Elimination Chamber match of the night. The first two superstars to start the match were Jericho and Michaels. They fought each other until Umaga entered, and dominated. Some of the highlights were Umaga performing a double Samoan Drop on Jericho and Michaels, and later, delivering his Samoan Wrecking Ball to Jericho through a pod. The next superstar to enter the match was JBL, who dominated the other three competitors for some time until he got eliminated by Jericho after a Codebreaker. After his elimination, JBL brought two steel chairs into the chamber to attack Jericho, Michaels and Umaga before leaving. Triple H entered the match next. Soon, every superstar delivered their finishing moves on Umaga, with Jericho delivering the Codebreaker, Michaels performing the Sweet Chin Music, Triple H executing the Pedigree, and finally Hardy delivering the Swanton Bomb from the top of a pod. Jericho took advantage and pinned Umaga to eliminate him. Hardy then eliminated Jericho soon after another Sweet Chin Music from Michaels. Later, Triple H eliminated Michaels after executing a Pedigree, following a Twist of Fate from Hardy. The final two men were Triple H and Hardy. They battled for about five minutes until Triple H delivered a Pedigree on Hardy, but failed to score the pinfall. Triple H tried to use a steel chair but Hardy retaliated, and attempted to deliver a Twist of Fate. Triple H countered the attempt by pushing Hardy into the steel chair. Finally, Triple H delivered a second and final Pedigree to Hardy, this time onto the steel chair, and pinned him to win the match, earning a WWE Championship match at WrestleMania.

== Aftermath ==
The following night on Raw, John Cena demanded a rematch for the WWE Championship. General Manager William Regal made a non-title match for later that night between Orton and Cena, where if Cena won, he would be included in the WWE Championship match at WrestleMania XXIV. Triple H was assigned to be the guest referee. Cena won the match after executing an FU to Orton, thus changing the match at WrestleMania to a triple threat match. After the match, Triple H delivered a Pedigree to both Orton and Cena. At WrestleMania, Orton defeated both Cena and Triple H to retain the WWE Championship.

Also on this episode of Raw, Big Show challenged Floyd Mayweather Jr. to a match, which Mayweather accepted. The match was announced the following week to be scheduled for WrestleMania. The two met at WrestleMania, in a No Disqualification match, which Mayweather won.

The feud between Rey Mysterio and Edge ended when, on the February 22 episode of SmackDown, Mysterio said that he needed surgery, and would be out of action for seven weeks. Edge then entered a feud with The Undertaker, the number one contender for the World Heavyweight Championship. Edge and Undertaker met in a World Heavyweight Championship match at WrestleMania, in which Undertaker defeated Edge to capture the World Heavyweight Championship, and to keep his undefeated streak intact.

On the February 25 episode of Raw, 2008 WWE Hall of Fame Inductee Ric Flair challenged Shawn Michaels to a match at WrestleMania. Michaels accepted with reluctance, knowing that due to a previous announcement from WWE Chairman Mr. McMahon the next match Flair loses would result in a forced retirement for Flair. Flair also said that "it would be an honor for him to retire at the hands of Shawn Michaels". At WrestleMania, Michaels defeated Flair, and Flair retired from WWE.

A triple threat match was made on ECW, where the winner would be the number one contender for the ECW Championship between CM Punk, Shelton Benjamin and Elijah Burke. Punk went on to win the match. One week later, on the March 4 episode of ECW, Punk fought Guerrero for the ECW Championship, but lost the match. Guerrero, however, lost the ECW Championship to Kane in just 11 seconds at WrestleMania XXIV.

== Results ==
No.	Results	Stipulations	Times
1^{D}	Kane defeated Shelton Benjamin by pinfall	Singles match	05:32
2	Chavo Guerrero (c) defeated CM Punk by pinfall	Singles match for the ECW Championship	07:06
3	The Undertaker defeated Batista, Finlay, Montel Vontavious Porter, The Great Khali (with Ranjin Singh), and Big Daddy V (with Matt Striker)	Elimination Chamber match for a World Heavyweight Championship match at WrestleMania XXIV	29:28
4	Ric Flair defeated Mr. Kennedy by submission	Career Threatening match If Flair had lost, he would be forced to retire.	07:13
5	Edge (c) defeated Rey Mysterio by pinfall	Singles match for the World Heavyweight Championship; Curt Hawkins and Zack Ryder were banned from ringside.	05:27
6	John Cena defeated Randy Orton (c) by disqualification	Singles match for the WWE Championship	15:51
7	Triple H defeated Jeff Hardy, Shawn Michaels, Chris Jericho, Umaga, and John "Bradshaw" Layfield	Elimination Chamber match for a WWE Championship match at WrestleMania XXIV	23:54
(c) / – the champion(s) heading into the match; D / – this was a dark match

=== Elimination Chamber entrances and eliminations (SmackDown/ECW) ===
Eliminated	Wrestler	Entered	Eliminated by	Method	Time
1	Big Daddy V	3	Batista	Pinned after a DDT by The Undertaker	09:07
2	The Great Khali	4	The Undertaker	Submitted to the Hell's Gate	12:38
3	MVP	6	Finlay	Pinned after being thrown off a chamber pod by The Undertaker	22:31
4	Finlay	5	The Undertaker	Pinned after a Chokeslam	24:11
5	Batista	1	The Undertaker	Pinned after a Tombstone Piledriver	29:28
Winner	The Undertaker	2			

=== Elimination Chamber entrances and eliminations (Raw) ===
Eliminated	Wrestler	Entered	Eliminated by	Method	Time
1	JBL	4	Chris Jericho	Pinned after a Codebreaker	13:44
2	Umaga	3	Chris Jericho	Pinned after a Pedigree from Triple H and a Swanton Bomb from Hardy	19:45
3	Chris Jericho	1	Jeff Hardy	Pinned after a Sweet Chin Music from Michaels	19:57
4	Shawn Michaels	2	Triple H	Pinned after a Pedigree	20:25
5	Jeff Hardy	6	Triple H	Pinned after a Pedigree on a chair	23:54
Winner	Triple H	5			23:54
