= WrestleMania XXIV =

2008 World Wrestling Entertainment pay-per-view event

- Promotional poster featuring various WWE wrestlers and boxer Floyd "Money" Mayweather
- Promotion: World Wrestling Entertainment
- Brands: Raw; SmackDown; ECW
- Date: March 30, 2008
- City: Orlando, Florida
- Venue: Florida Citrus Bowl
- Attendance: 74,635
- Buy rate: 1,041,000
- Tagline: "The Biggest WrestleMania Under the Sun"

Pay-per-view chronology
← Previous; No Way Out	Next → Backlash

WrestleMania chronology
← Previous; 23	Next → 25

WrestleMania XXIV was a 2008 professional wrestling pay-per-view (PPV) event produced by World Wrestling Entertainment (WWE). It was the 24th annual WrestleMania and took place on March 30, 2008, at the Florida Citrus Bowl in Orlando, Florida, held for wrestlers from the promotion's Raw, SmackDown, and ECW brand divisions. This was the first WrestleMania to be held in the U.S. state of Florida and was also the second WrestleMania to be held outdoors, after WrestleMania IX in 1993. Kim Kardashian served as the hostess of the event.

Nine professional wrestling matches were scheduled for the event, which featured a supercard, a scheduling of more than one main event. In the final match of the event, which was the main match from SmackDown, The Undertaker defeated Edge to win the World Heavyweight Championship. Raw's main match was a triple threat match, in which Randy Orton defeated Triple H and John Cena to retain the WWE Championship. The main match from the ECW brand was a singles match in which Kane defeated Chavo Guerrero to win the ECW Championship, the only time the ECW Championship was defended at WrestleMania. From the six scheduled bouts on the undercard, three received more promotion than the others. In a No Disqualification match, professional boxer Floyd "Money" Mayweather defeated Big Show. The other featured undercard matches saw CM Punk win the inter-promotional Money in the Bank ladder match against Carlito, Chris Jericho, John Morrison, Montel Vontavious Porter, Mr. Kennedy, and Shelton Benjamin, and a Career Threatening match in which Shawn Michaels defeated Ric Flair, leading to Flair's departure from WWE and a period of retirement from active wrestling.

Tickets for the event commenced sale to the public on November 3, 2007. WWE and the City of Orlando hosted festivities that spanned a five-day period within the central Florida region. For the second consecutive year, WrestleMania broke the record for the highest-grossing pay-per-view in WWE history. It also set a gate record for the Citrus Bowl, grossing US$5.85 million in ticket sales. According to a study by Enigma Research Corporation of Toronto, the Citrus Bowl's record-breaking attendance brought an estimated $51.5 million – surpassing the projected $25 million – into the local economy and generated $1.8 million in local tax revenue. The Central Florida Sports Commission reported that the event created jobs and brought approximately 60,000 visitors to the city. Over one million people ordered the event on pay-per-view, grossing $23.8 million in revenue. It was also the first WrestleMania broadcast in high definition.

== Production ==
=== Background ===
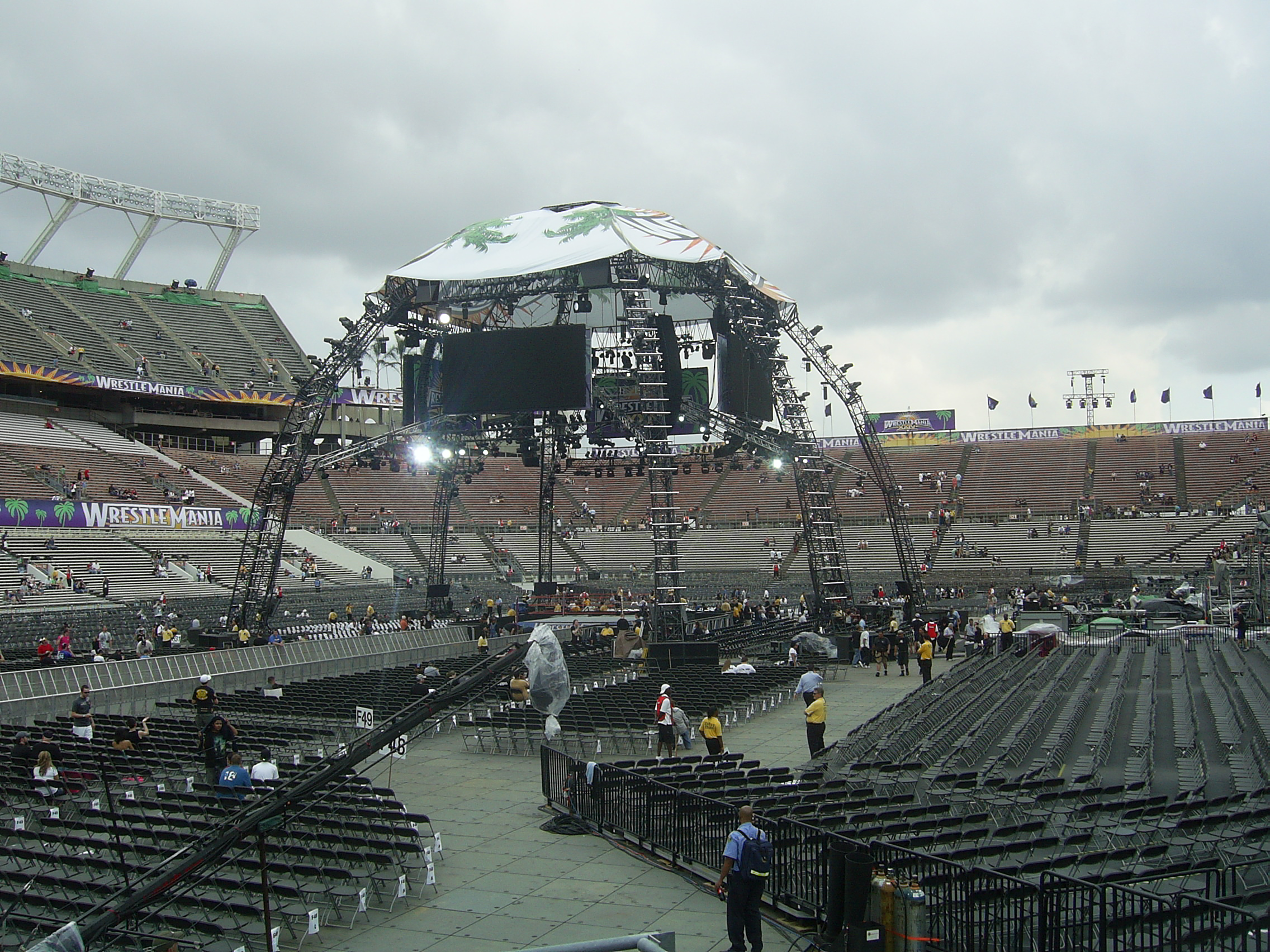
A steel rig with a tarpaulin was placed over the ring at WrestleMania XXIV.

WrestleMania is considered World Wrestling Entertainment's (WWE) flagship professional wrestling pay-per-view (PPV) event, having first been held in 1985. It has become the longest-running professional wrestling event in history and is held annually between mid-March to mid-April. It was the first of WWE's original four pay-per-views, which includes Royal Rumble, SummerSlam, and Survivor Series, referred to as the "Big Four".

On March 21, 2007, a press conference was held at City Hall in Orlando, Florida, formally announcing that WrestleMania XXIV would be held in Orlando at the Florida Citrus Bowl on March 30, 2008, which would be the first WrestleMania held in Florida. The event featured wrestlers from the Raw, SmackDown, and ECW brands. According to an interview with The Daytona Beach News-Journal at the press conference, WWE chairman Vince McMahon mentioned Orlando being one of three front-runners to host the event, the other two being Las Vegas, Nevada and Paris, France. McMahon explained that Orlando was chosen as geographically, a WrestleMania was never held in Southeastern United States before.

As the second WrestleMania to be held entirely outdoors (after WrestleMania IX in 1993), McMahon also announced that the event would have taken place regardless of the weather conditions. In the March 2008 issue of WWE Magazine, WWE set designer Jason Robinson revealed that a steel rig with a tarpaulin roof would be built above the ring itself to prevent rain from falling on the ring; during the Money in the Bank ladder match, it rained briefly. In that same issue, an initial design of the ring setup was revealed showing a larger rig surrounding the tarpaulin rig, with lighting and two giant screens attached. The final design had the lighting and video screens on the tarpaulin rig, as well as the sound system. During an interview, WWE production manager Brian Petree mentioned that video reinforcement should prevent anyone's view from being obstructed by the steel structure. Up to seven generators were used to power up the event.

The set design for the entrance stage was at the north end of the stadium and consisted of another steel structure with various video screens hanging from it. The steel beams for the structure were custom built in Belgium and shipped over to Orlando. According to WWE Magazine, the amount of pyrotechnics used would be ten times that of the amount used on Raw. Without the restriction of a roof, the pyrotechnics for the show shot as high as 2,000 feet (610 m) as compared to WrestleMania 23's height of 150 feet (46 m). The fireworks were set off from boats on one of the lakes nearby the stadium. WWE claimed an estimated US$300,000 was spent on the fireworks alone.

With the Citrus Bowl's locker rooms on the south side and the entrance set on the north side, a tented 40,000 square feet (3,700 m^{2}) mini-city outside the north end served as the show's backstage area and included air conditioning, trailers, VIP areas, showers, and restrooms. As a consequence, the road next to the north end zone, W. Church Street, was closed down until a day after the event. Numerous other roads were also closed to allow trucks and forklifts to move in mega equipment for the event. The ring itself was built on the 50-yard line of the Citrus Bowl to give the best view for fans. Heavy-duty plastic flooring had been put over the field, to protect the turf, provide seating, and serve as the steel structures' foundation.

Development on the set design began in the middle of 2007. The building of the actual set began in the middle of March 2008. 100 people worked 16 hours a day to construct the set for the event. The construction finished on March 29. WrestleMania XXIV was the first WrestleMania event to be filmed in high-definition. It was also the first WWE show and sports-related title to be released on the Blu-ray Disc format by WWE Home Video. WrestleMania also led to an increase in sales for musical artists related to the event, including the Red Hot Chili Peppers' album Stadium Arcadium, John Legend's album Live from Philadelphia, Rev Theory's single "Light It Up", and Fuel's single "Leave the Memories Alone", which was used as part of a tribute to Ric Flair.

=== Storylines ===
WrestleMania XXIV featured nine professional wrestling matches with wrestlers involved in pre-existing scripted feuds, plots, and storylines. All wrestlers belonged to either the Raw, SmackDown, or ECW brand – storyline divisions in which WWE assigned its employees to different programs.

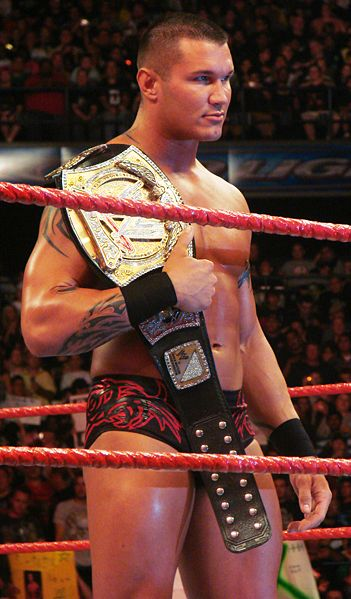
Randy Orton defended Raw's WWE Championship at the event.

The predominant rivalry scripted into WrestleMania on the Raw brand was between Randy Orton, John Cena, and Triple H, over the WWE Championship. At the Royal Rumble pay-per-view event in January, Orton successfully defended the WWE Championship against Jeff Hardy and later that night, Cena returned from an injury and won the Royal Rumble match when he last eliminated Triple H. Instead of challenging Orton for the title at WrestleMania, Cena decided to challenge him at No Way Out, where Orton got himself intentionally disqualified by slapping the referee, thus retaining the WWE Championship. Later, Triple H also became a top contender to the WWE Championship by defeating five other men in an Elimination Chamber match. The next night on Raw, Cena argued that he deserved another WWE Championship match. Raw general manager William Regal then announced that Cena would face Orton later in the night, where if Cena won, he would be added to the WrestleMania match between Triple H and Orton, making it a triple threat match. If Orton won, the main event would remain as Orton versus Triple H in a singles match. However, Cena won the match and was added to the bout at WrestleMania. After the match, Triple H, who was the special guest referee, executed a Pedigree on both Cena and Orton.

The predominant rivalry on the SmackDown brand was between Edge and The Undertaker, over the World Heavyweight Championship. On the February 1 episode of SmackDown, assistant general manager Theodore Long announced that at No Way Out, an Elimination Chamber match would be held to determine the number one contender to the World Heavyweight Championship at WrestleMania. The Undertaker won the match by last eliminating Batista. On the following episode of SmackDown, Edge predicted that The Undertaker's 15–0 undefeated streak at WrestleMania would come to an end once he defeated him. Two weeks later on the March 7 episode of SmackDown, the team of Edge and Curt Hawkins and Zack Ryder defeated The Undertaker in a Handicap match after Edge pinned The Undertaker. The following week, La Familia (Chavo Guerrero, Edge, Hawkins and Ryder) defeated Ric Flair and Shawn Michaels in a steel cage match. During the match, Undertaker interfered and attacked La Familia. However, Edge escaped the cage to win the match for his team. Two weeks later on SmackDown, Edge, along with Vickie Guerrero, Hawkins and Ryder, held a mock burial entitled "Burial of The Undertaker's WrestleMania Undefeated Streak", to celebrate Edge's early victory over The Undertaker. During the "burial", however, The Undertaker emerged from a casket, which was inside the ring, and attacked Edge, Hawkins, and Ryder, knocking Hawkins and Ryder outside the ring and chokeslamming Edge through the casket.

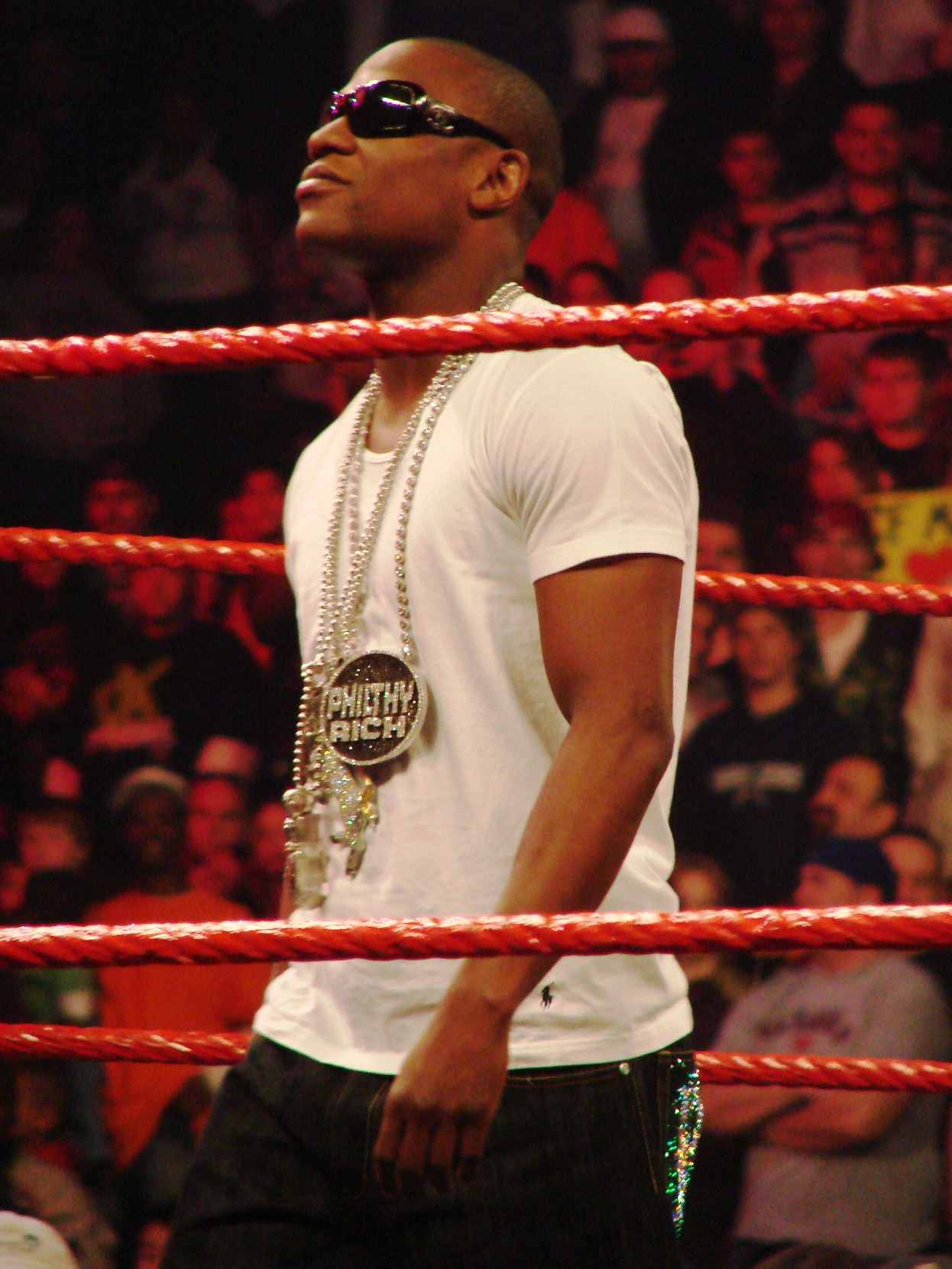
Professional boxer Floyd Mayweather Jr., who took on Big Show in a No Disqualification match

At No Way Out, Big Show made a return to the company after taking time off for injuries beginning in December 2006. In his return promotional interview, Big Show threatened to give Rey Mysterio a chokeslam. Professional boxer and WBC Welterweight Champion Floyd "Money" Mayweather, who was in attendance and a close friend of Mysterio's, came to his aid and confronted Big Show. After Big Show dropped to his knees, Mayweather attacked him with a combination of punches, which caused Big Show to bleed from the nose and mouth. The following night on Raw, Big Show challenged Mayweather to a wrestling match, which Mayweather accepted. As part of the storyline, Big Show arranged an exhibition match with fighter Brandon Hill, who was similar in size and stature to Mayweather. Unimpressed with Big Show's display of dominance over Hill, Mayweather told Big Show that "at WrestleMania, I'm going to break your jaw". At their weigh-in for their WrestleMania match, Big Show threw Mayweather into a crowd of wrestlers to emphasise the disparity in size.

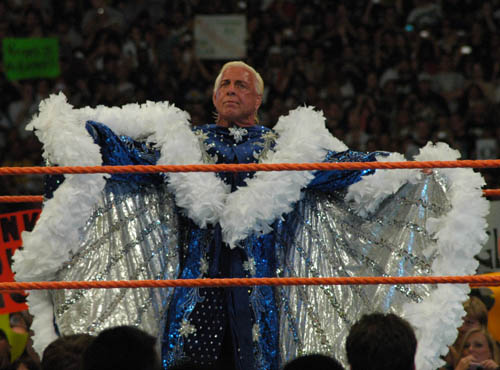
Ric Flair before his last WWE match at WrestleMania XXIV

On the February 25 episode of Raw, 2008 WWE Hall of Fame Inductee Ric Flair challenged Shawn Michaels to a match at WrestleMania. Michaels accepted after some reluctance, knowing that due to a previous announcement from WWE chairman Mr. McMahon the next match Flair lost would result in his forced retirement. Flair said that "it would be an honor for [him] to retire at the hands of Shawn Michaels."

On February 18, WWE announced via its website that the fourth annual Money in the Bank ladder match would take place at WrestleMania XXIV, a match where the objective is to retrieve a briefcase suspended in the air using a ladder. The match involved wrestlers from all three WWE brands. The winner would earn a contract to challenge for any of the three WWE world championships (Raw's WWE Championship, SmackDown's World Heavyweight Championship, or the ECW Championship) at any time and any place over a one-year period. Qualifying matches occurred to determine the participants in the match at WrestleMania, starting on that night's Raw with Jeff Hardy and Mr. Kennedy defeating Snitsky and Val Venis respectively to qualify. Shelton Benjamin became the third participant when he defeated Jimmy Wang Yang on the following episode of SmackDown. During the next two weeks on Raw, Chris Jericho defeated Hardy, and Carlito defeated Cody Rhodes to qualify. At a non-televised SmackDown/ECW house show held on March 8, Montel Vontavious Porter qualified when he defeated Jamie Noble. On the March 11 episode of ECW, CM Punk became the seventh entrant when he defeated Big Daddy V. John Morrison was the final person to qualify when he beat The Miz on the March 14 episode of SmackDown. Hardy was later removed from the match after a legitimate suspension by WWE for a drug violation of the company's Wellness Policy. WWE decided not to add another superstar in his place, making that year's Money in the Bank ladder match the first year to have seven participants.

==== Cancelled matches ====
Although Finlay was embroiled in a feud with John "Bradshaw" Layfield (JBL), Hornswoggle revealed in a May 2024 interview that Finlay was planned to face Vince McMahon for a championship during an illegitimate son storyline but the plans were dropped. In addition, McMahon was also planned to return with Mr. Kennedy following a limo explosion in June 2007. The storyline was set to begin on the June 25 episode of Raw with the McMahon family holding a "funeral" for Vince, but these plans were ultimately scrapped following the Chris Benoit double murder and suicide.

== Event ==
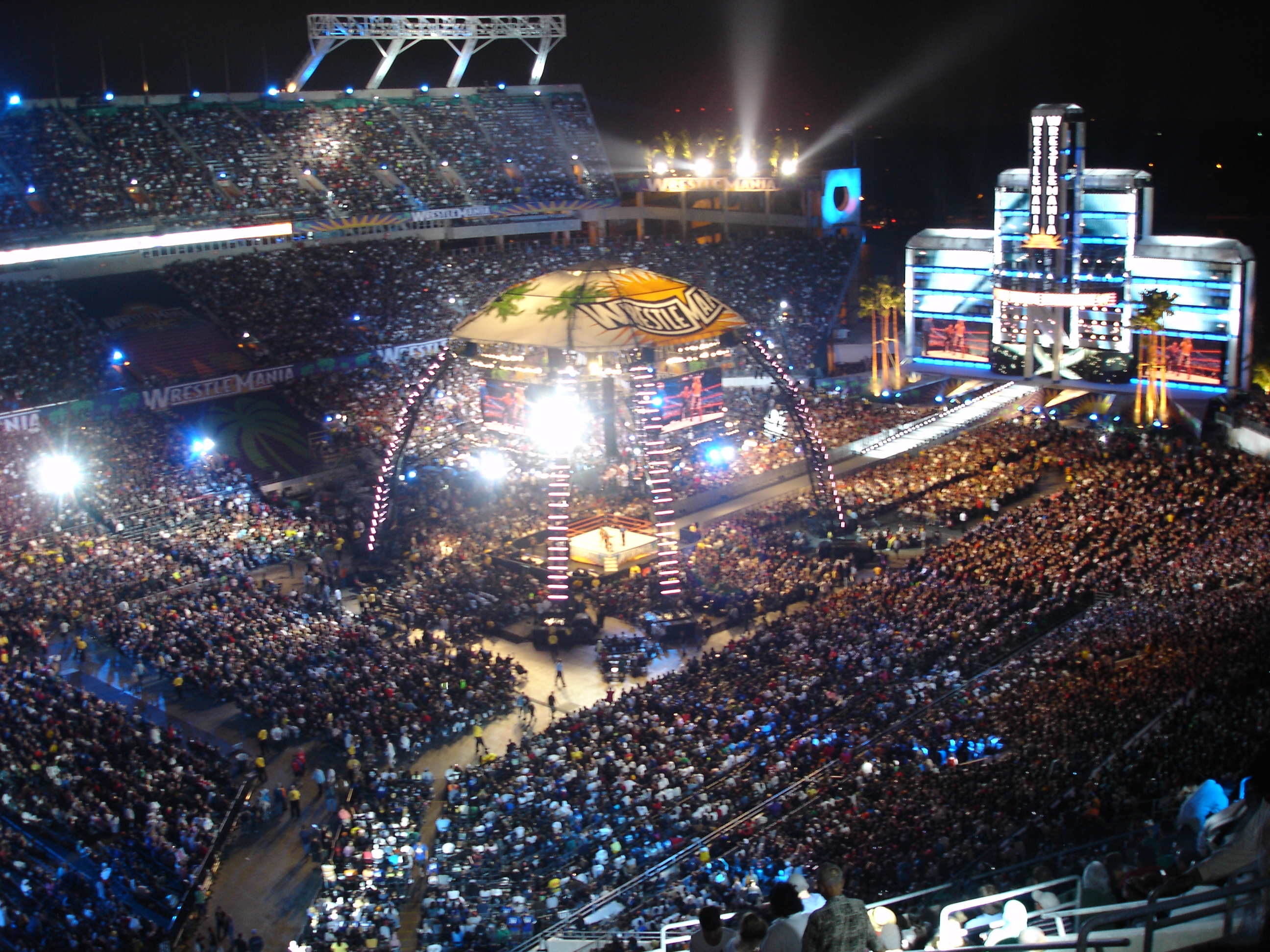
An attendance record setting 74,635 fans at the Citrus Bowl for WrestleMania XXIV

Other on-screen personnel
Role:	Name:
English commentators	Jim Ross (Raw)
English commentators	Jerry Lawler (Raw)
English commentators	Michael Cole (SmackDown)
English commentators	Jonathan Coachman (SmackDown)
English commentators	Joey Styles (ECW)
English commentators	Tazz (ECW)
Spanish commentators	Carlos Cabrera
Spanish commentators	Hugo Savinovich
Interviewer	Mike Adamle
Interviewer	Todd Grisham
Hostess	Kim Kardashian
Master of Ceremonies	Snoop Dogg
Ring announcers	Tony Chimel (ECW)
Ring announcers	Armando Estrada (ECW Championship)
Ring announcers	Howard Finkel (WWE Hall of Fame)
Ring announcers	Lilian Garcia (Raw)
Ring announcers	Theodore Long (Raw vs. SmackDown)
Ring announcers	William Regal (Raw vs. SmackDown)
Ring announcers	Justin Roberts (SmackDown/Money in the Bank match)
Referee	Scott Armstrong (ECW)
Referee	Mike Posey (ECW)
Referee	John Cone (Raw)
Referee	Mike Chioda (Raw)
Referee	Jack Doan (Raw)
Referee	Marty Elias (Raw)
Referee	Mickie Henson (SmackDown)
Referee	Jim Korderas (SmackDown)
Referee	Chad Patton (Raw)
Referee	Charles Robinson (SmackDown)

=== Pre-show ===
Before the show aired live on pay-per-view, Kane won a 24-man Interpromotional Battle Royal, an elimination style match where the last person remaining was the winner, to win an ECW Championship match against Chavo Guerrero later that night. The event officially began with John Legend singing a rendition of "America the Beautiful".

=== Preliminary matches ===
The first match was a Belfast Brawl between Finlay and John "Bradshaw" Layfield (JBL), a match in which there were no disqualifications or countouts and the match outcomes could have occurred anywhere. Finlay was accompanied to the ring by his storyline son, Hornswoggle, who was returning from a scripted injury suffered at the hands of JBL. During the match, JBL hit Finlay with a trash can lid when the latter was about to perform a suicide dive on him through the ropes on the outside. Later on, Finlay tossed JBL through a table that he had set up earlier on the turnbuckle. Hornswoggle also got involved during the match by hitting JBL with a kendo stick, while later on JBL threw a trash can at him. Attacking Finlay's knee with a kendo stick, JBL delivered a Clothesline from Hell to Finlay to score a successful pinfall. This was an interpromotional match.

The next match of the evening was the fourth-annual Money in the Bank ladder match, in which there were no disqualifications or countouts, and the only way to win the match was to climb a ladder in the ring and retrieve a contract briefcase hanging above. The match featured Chris Jericho, Mr. Kennedy, and Carlito from the Raw brand; CM Punk, Shelton Benjamin, and John Morrison from the ECW brand; and Montel Vontavious Porter (MVP) from the SmackDown brand. Jeff Hardy was supposed to be in the match, but he legitimately violated the wellness program and was taken out of the match. Early in the match, Morrison climbed a turnbuckle and performed a moonsault onto other competitors outside the ring while holding a ladder against his chest. Later, while Kennedy and Morrison were battling on top of a ladder, Benjamin climbed another ladder placed adjacent to the first one and performed a sunset flip powerbomb on Kennedy, who in turn superplexed Morrison from the top of the ladder. Later, Carlito and Kennedy flipped Benjamin off a ladder in the ring, sending him crashing through another ladder set-up between the barricade and the ring apron. When MVP was close to retrieving the contract briefcase, Matt Hardy (returning to action after suffering a legitimate injury), entered the ring from the crowd, climbed the ladder, and delivered a Twist of Fate to MVP off that ladder. As soon as Morrison started to climb a ladder, see-sawing with another ladder, Jericho flipped the other one and Morrison landed on the ring-ropes groin-first. Jericho even performed a Codebreaker on Punk using a ladder. In the end, Jericho and Punk fought each other on a ladder, but Punk trapped Jericho's one leg in the ladder's steps and retrieved the briefcase to win the match. This was an interpromotional match.

Next after that match, Howard Finkel introduced the 2008 WWE Hall of Fame class: Jack and Gerald Brisco, Gordon Solie (represented by his family), Rocky Johnson, High Chief Peter Maivia (represented by his wife Lia and daughter Ata), Eddie Graham (represented by his son Mike), Mae Young, and Ric Flair (represented by his family).

The next match, which was billed as a "Battle for Brand Supremacy", was between SmackDown's Batista and Raw's Umaga. Early in the match, both Batista and Umaga exchanged blows and Batista knocked Umaga outside with a shoulder block. Umaga later kicked Batista in the face, which caused him to fall back-first outside the ring from the ring-apron. As a result, Umaga started targeting Batista's injured back. In the end, however, when Umaga tried to perform his Samoan Spike, Batista countered the attempt and gave him a spinebuster. Batista won the match by pinning Umaga after a Batista Bomb.

The fourth match for the event featured Chavo Guerrero defending his ECW Championship against Kane. Kane surprised Chavo by emerging from underneath the ring instead of from the entrance stage during his ring entrance. Kane instantly pinned Chavo after a chokeslam and won the ECW Championship in eleven seconds. This was the only ECW match on the show and the only ECW Championship match in WrestleMania history.

=== Main event matches ===
Ric Flair's "Career Threatening" match against Shawn Michaels was next, which stipulated that Flair would have to retire from wrestling if he had lost. At the start of the match, both superstars engaged in a series of counters, and then Flair shoved Michaels in a corner, making "Old Yeller" comments to him. In retaliation, Michaels slapped Flair in the face, which caused him to start bleeding from the mouth. Later, Michaels attempted Sweet Chin Music, but stopped in the process and Flair capitalized by trapping him in his figure four leglock. Afterward, Michaels finally delivered the Sweet Chin Music to Flair for a near-fall. Michaels then trapped Flair in his modified figure four leglock, but Flair delivered a thumb to the eye to Michaels to break the submission. Flair performed a low-blow for a near-fall. As Flair was delivering chops to Michaels' chest, Michaels executed a second Sweet Chin Music. After getting up on his feet with a worried face, Michaels said to Flair "I'm sorry, I love you", before nailing a final Sweet Chin Music and thus pinning Flair to end his 35-year-long wrestling career. After the match, Michaels left quickly and Flair got a standing ovation from the crowd. An emotional Flair embraced his family at ringside and then, as he proceeded to go backstage, he thanked the crowd for their support.

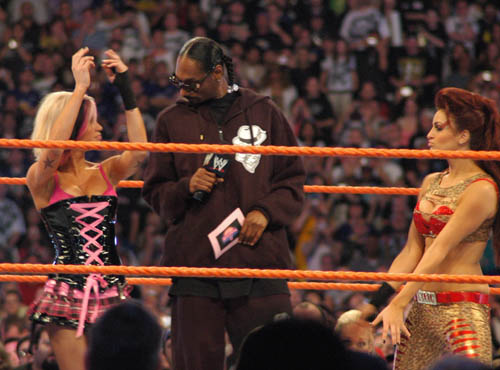
Snoop Dogg at WrestleMania XXIV with Ashley Massaro and tag team partner Maria

The sixth match was the Playboy BunnyMania Lumberjack match, in which Maria and Ashley (the latter who replaced Candice Michelle due to injury) faced Beth Phoenix and Melina, who were accompanied to the ring by Santino Marella. Rapper Snoop Dogg served as the official "Master of Ceremonies" for the match. In the match, several WWE Divas surrounded the ring and were able to interfere in the match without disqualifications. Due to some technical difficulties, the lights at Citrus Bowl temporarily went out during the match. Near the end, a pin attempt by Maria was prevented when Marella pulled Maria's leg. In response, Raw commentator Jerry Lawler approached and knocked Marella down with a punch. Phoenix executed a Fisherman Suplex and pinned Maria to win the match. After the match, Snoop Dogg executed a Clothesline on Marella and kissed Maria, before leaving with her and Ashley.

Next was Randy Orton defending his WWE Championship against Triple H and John Cena in a triple threat match, which is a standard match involving three wrestlers with no disqualifications. For his entrance, Cena had the Jones High School Marching Tigers marching band perform an instrumental version of his theme song "The Time Is Now" live. During the match, when Triple H had held Orton in a sleeper hold, Cena picked up both Orton and Triple H for an FU, but Triple H dropped down and low blowed him. Orton then dominated the match for some time; one highlight of the match featured Orton performing a crossbody from the top rope on Cena, while the latter was held on Triple H's shoulders in a seating position. Orton also performed a DDT to both Cena and Triple H simultaneously. Orton then tried to perform an RKO on Cena, but he countered and threw Orton onto Triple H. Triple H then started targeting Orton's legs and using some submissions on him. The match came to an end when Cena had Triple H on his shoulders for the FU, but was countered into a Pedigree. As Triple H was in the pin, Orton punted Triple H and pinned Cena to win the match and retain the WWE Championship.

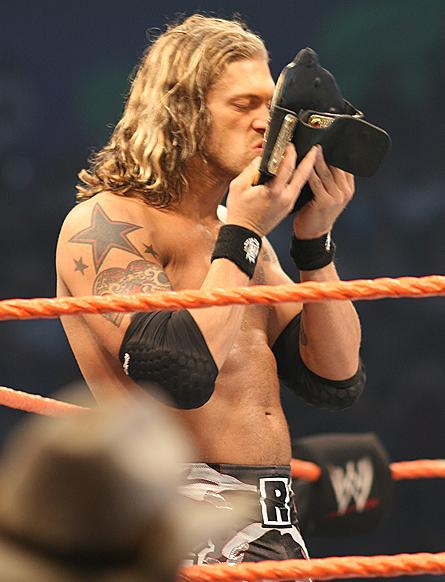
Edge lost SmackDown's World Heavyweight Championship to The Undertaker.

The next match was the No Disqualification match between Big Show and Floyd Mayweather. Early in the match, Mayweather repeatedly escaped Big Show's grasp and delivered body shots to him. Mayweather and his accomplices tried to "walk out" of the match, but Big Show walked up the ramp and brought Mayweather back in the ring. As Big Show was about to chokeslam Mayweather, one of Mayweather's accomplices struck a steel chair on Big Show's back, and the latter chokeslammed him in retaliation. Capitalizing from this distraction, Mayweather grabbed that chair and hit Big Show multiple times on the head with it. Finally, Mayweather removed his right glove and put on a pair of brass knuckles to hit Big Show in the face. As a result, Big Show was knocked out as he could not answer the referee's ten count, and Mayweather was declared the winner.

The main event of the night saw Edge putting his World Heavyweight Championship on the line against The Undertaker. This was The Undertaker's first WrestleMania main event in 11 years, last main eventing against Sycho Sid at WrestleMania 13. The early going of the match was slow-paced, in which both superstars countered each other's maneuvers. During the match, The Undertaker ran and leapt over the top rope from the ring onto Edge on the outside. Then throughout the match, Edge was able to counter The Undertaker's numerous signature moves, including the Chokeslam, Old School and the Last Ride, a variation of the powerbomb. Near the end, Edge hit The Undertaker with a television camera while the referee was knocked down. When he proceeded to deliver a Tombstone Piledriver to The Undertaker, The Undertaker countered it into his own version and successfully delivered it to Edge for a very delayed two-count. Curt Hawkins and Zack Ryder came to the ring for Edge's aid, but The Undertaker took them out. Because of their distraction, Edge was able to execute a spear on The Undertaker for a near-fall. When Edge delivered another spear to The Undertaker, The Undertaker applied Hell's Gate and forced Edge to submit to win the World Heavyweight Championship, improving his WrestleMania record to 16–0.

== Reception ==
Approximately 1,058,000 people ordered WrestleMania XXIV, grossing $23.8 million in revenue. Canadian Online Explorer's professional wrestling section gave the entire event 9 out of 10 stars. The rating was higher than WrestleMania 23 which received 8 out of 10 stars. The main event between The Undertaker and Edge for the World Heavyweight Championship was rated a 9.5 out of 10 stars. The Career Threatening match between Ric Flair and Shawn Michaels was rated a perfect 10 out of 10. Big Show vs. Floyd "Money" Mayweather Jr. was rated 7 out of 10 stars, and the Triple Threat match for the WWE Championship between Randy Orton, Triple H and John Cena was rated 8.5 out of 10 stars.

== Aftermath ==
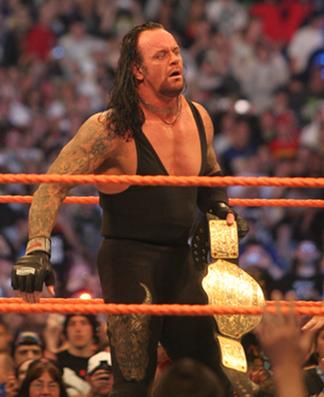
The Undertaker after defeating Edge at WrestleMania XXIV

After the show, WWE was criticized for a malfunction in the pyrotechnics during The Undertaker's victory celebration. During the celebration, a hot cable for pyrotechnics was sent flying into audience members in the upper seating bowl of the stadium, leaving 45 injured, with some hospitalized. The accident was apparently due to a cable which fireworks were traveling across snapping, thus resulting in the fireworks exploding into the top rows of the upper bowl of the stadium. WWE's corporate website released a statement afterward stating that they would investigate the incident, but the results of the investigation were never released.

On the following episode of Raw, Ric Flair made his farewell speech, which led to Triple H introducing various people from Flair's past, such as the Four Horsemen, Ricky Steamboat, and others, each coming out to give an emotional farewell. Afterward, the entire WWE roster came out to say thank you to Flair. Shawn Michaels, who was clearly upset about retiring Flair, was forgiven by Flair. Despite Flair's forgiveness, his former protégé Batista later started a feud with Michaels, citing Michaels' "selfishness" at WrestleMania for not lying down for Flair. The two had a match booked at Backlash, and after a confrontation between Michaels and Chris Jericho, Jericho was later added into the match as a special guest referee. Michaels won with a superkick.

The feud between Randy Orton, John Cena, and Triple H continued after WrestleMania with the added involvement of John "Bradshaw" Layfield (JBL) leading to a fatal four-way elimination match between all four at Backlash. At Backlash, Triple H won his seventh WWE Championship by last pinning Orton. With Matt Hardy's return at WrestleMania, his feud with Montel Vontavious Porter over the WWE United States Championship, that had started in July 2007, was revived with a match booked at Backlash, which Hardy won. The rivalries between The Undertaker and Edge and the one between Kane and Chavo Guerrero both continued with successful title defenses at Backlash. On the May 2 episode of SmackDown, General Manager Vickie Guerrero stripped The Undertaker of the World Heavyweight Championship because of his continued use of his illegal chokehold, claiming she did it to protect the other wrestlers.

=== DVD / Blu-ray release ===
The event was released on DVD and Blu-ray Disc by WWE Home Video in the United States on May 20, 2008, after it had completed broadcast on pay-per-view. It was also released on UMD on August 23, 2008. It was the first WWE PPV event to be released via the Blu-ray and UMD format, as well as the only one on the latter format. As well as the event, the DVD/Blu-ray Disc release features bonus material in the form of the 2008 Hall of Fame ceremony in its entirety and the battle royal that took place before the event.

== Results ==
No.	Results	Stipulations	Times
1^{P}	Kane won by last eliminating Mark Henry (Note: Order of elimination: Deuce, Domino, Jim Duggan, Stevie Richards, Elijah Burke, The Miz, Shannon Moore, Jimmy Wang Yang, Jesse, Val Venis, Trevor Murdoch, Festus, The Brian Kendrick, Lance Cade, Kofi Kingston, Cody Rhodes, Jamie Noble, Chuck Palumbo, The Great Khali, Hardcore Holly, Tommy Dreamer, Snitsky, Mark Henry.)	24-Man Battle Royal to determine the #1 contender for the ECW Championship	06:22
2	John "Bradshaw" Layfield defeated Finlay (with Hornswoggle) by pinfall	Belfast Brawl	08:43
3	CM Punk defeated Shelton Benjamin, Chris Jericho, Carlito, Montel Vontavious Porter, Mr. Kennedy, and John Morrison	Money in the Bank ladder match	15:12
4	Batista (SmackDown) defeated Umaga (Raw) by pinfall	'Battle for Brand Supremacy' Singles match	07:03
5	Kane defeated Chavo Guerrero (c) by pinfall	Singles match for the ECW Championship	00:08
6	Shawn Michaels defeated Ric Flair by pinfall	Career Threatening match Since Flair lost, he had to retire from in-ring competition. (Note: Flair would later wrestle more matches outside WWE.)	21:34
7	Beth Phoenix and Melina (with Santino Marella) defeated Maria and Ashley (with Snoop Dogg) by pinfall (Note: The lumberjills were: Eve Torres, Cherry, Jillian Hall, Maryse, Katie Lea Burchill, Layla, Kelly Kelly, Michelle McCool, Mickie James and Victoria) (Note: Ashley Massaro replaced Candice Michelle, who could not participate due to injury.)	Playboy BunnyMania Lumberjill match	05:00
8	Randy Orton (c) defeated Triple H and John Cena by pinfall	Triple threat match for the WWE Championship	15:10
9	Floyd "Money" Mayweather defeated Big Show by knockout	No Disqualification match	11:40
10	The Undertaker defeated Edge (c) by submission	Singles match for the World Heavyweight Championship	24:03
(c) / – the champion(s) heading into the match; P / – the match was broadcast on the pre-show
