= Unforgiven (2000) =

World Wrestling Federation pay-per-view event

- Promotional poster featuring The Undertaker
- Promotion: World Wrestling Federation
- Date: September 24, 2000
- City: Philadelphia, Pennsylvania
- Venue: First Union Center
- Attendance: 19,315
- Buy rate: 605,000

Pay-per-view chronology
← Previous; SummerSlam	Next → No Mercy

Unforgiven chronology
← Previous; 1999	Next → 2001

The 2000 Unforgiven was a professional wrestling pay-per-view (PPV) event produced by the World Wrestling Federation (WWF, now WWE). It was the third annual Unforgiven and took place on September 24, 2000, at the First Union Center in Philadelphia, Pennsylvania. Eight matches were contested at the event.

The main event was a Fatal Four-Way match for the WWF Championship. The Rock defended the title against Chris Benoit, The Undertaker, and Kane. Benoit originally won the match by pinning The Undertaker, but since The Undertaker's foot was on the rope, and the referee did not notice it, the match was restarted, and The Rock pinned Benoit after a Rock Bottom to retain the title.

The undercard featured Triple H versus Kurt Angle in a No Disqualification match with WWF Commissioner Mick Foley serving as special guest referee, Eddie Guerrero versus Rikishi for the WWF Intercontinental Championship, Edge and Christian versus The Hardy Boyz (Jeff Hardy and Matt Hardy) in a Steel Cage match for the WWF Tag Team Championship, Chris Jericho versus X-Pac, a 10-Minute Hardcore Battle Royal for the WWF Hardcore Championship, Tazz versus Jerry Lawler in a Strap Match, and Right to Censor (Steven Richards, Val Venis, Bull Buchanan, and The Goodfather) versus The Dudley Boyz (Bubba Ray Dudley and D-Von Dudley) and The Acolytes Protection Agency (Faarooq and Bradshaw) in an eight-man tag team match.

This event also marked the return of "Stone Cold" Steve Austin after a 10-month absence, except for his appearances at Backlash; as well as Raw is War and SmackDown! episodes building into the late April pay-per-view.

== Production ==
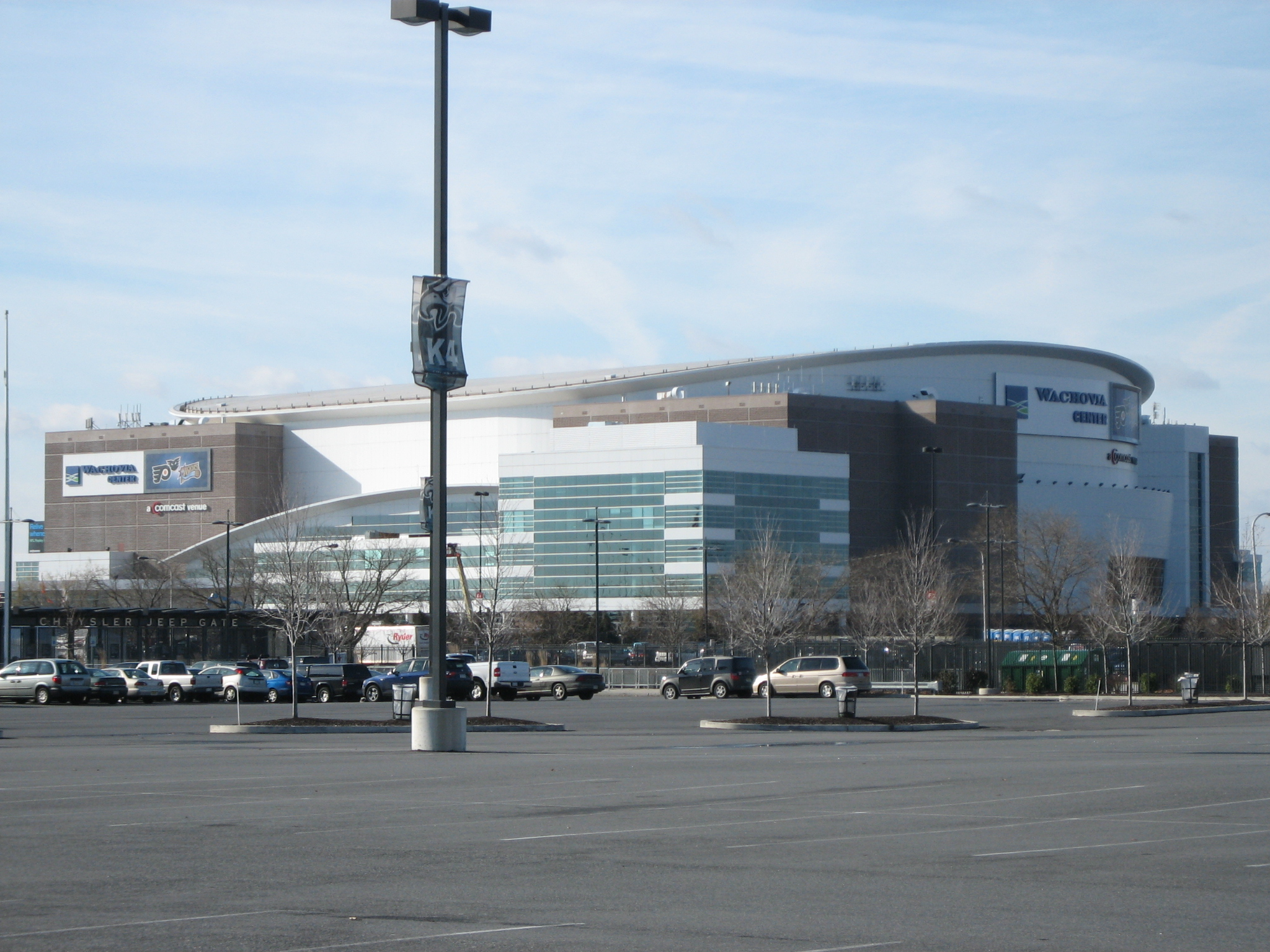
The second annual Unforgiven event took place at the First Union Center in Philadelphia, Pennsylvania.

=== Background ===
Unforgiven was first held as the 21st In Your House pay-per-view (PPV) event in April 1998; In Your House was a series of monthly professional wrestling PPV shows first produced by the World Wrestling Federation (WWF, now WWE) in May 1995. The In Your House branding was retired following February 1999's St. Valentine's Day Massacre: In Your House event, as the company moved to install permanent names for each of its monthly PPVs. Unforgiven then returned in September 1999 as its own PPV event, thus establishing Unforgiven as the annual September PPV for the promotion. The third Unforgiven event took place on September 24 at the First Union Center in Philadelphia, Pennsylvania.

=== Storylines ===
Unforgiven featured professional wrestling matches that involved different wrestlers from pre-existing feuds, plots, and storylines that were played out on Raw is War, and SmackDown!—the WWF's television programs.

The main rivalry heading into the event was between The Rock, Chris Benoit, The Undertaker, and Kane over Rock's WWF Championship. On the August 28 episode of Raw is War, Undertaker cost Kane a title opportunity against Rock. On the August 31 episode of SmackDown!, Undertaker, and Benoit wrestled in a number one contender's match, which Undertaker won by disqualification after being attacked by Kane. However, due to earning the victory by disqualification, Undertaker was not made the number one contender. This led to a number one contender's match between Benoit, and Kane on the September 4 episode of Raw is War. Benoit was disqualified again for hitting Kane with a chair, and the position of the number one contender remained vacant. On the September 11 episode of Raw is War, Benoit, and Kane defeated Rock, and Undertaker in a tag team match. After the match, the WWF Commissioner Mick Foley announced that Rock would defend the title against Benoit, Undertaker, and Kane in a fatal four-Way match at Unforgiven.

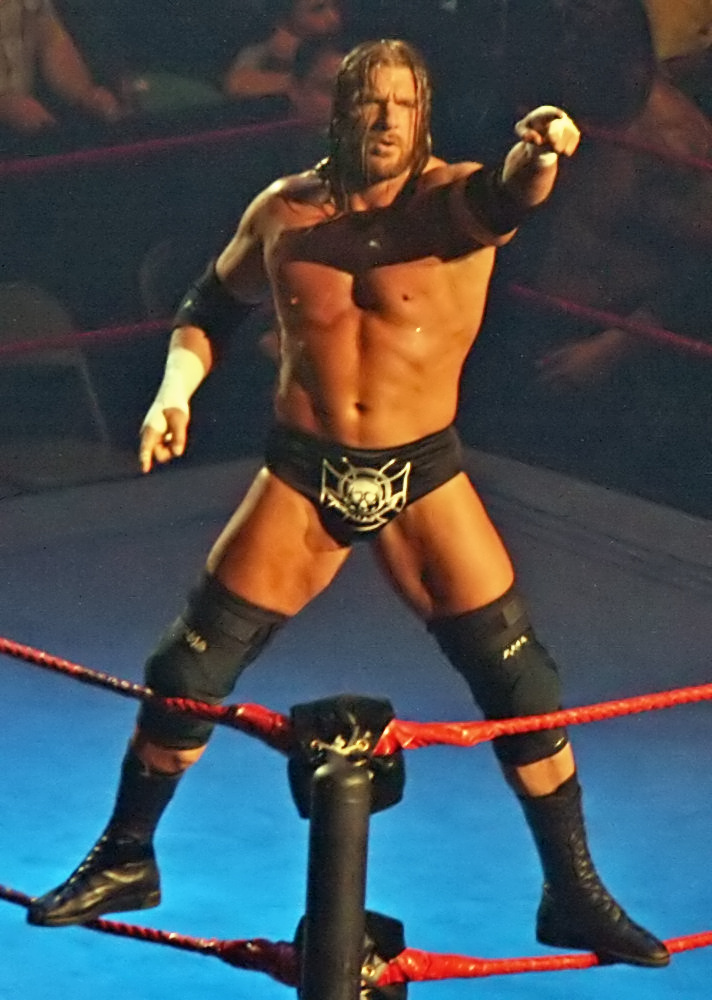
Triple H wrestled Kurt Angle in a No Disqualification match at Unforgiven.

Another predominant rivalry heading into the event was between Triple H, and Kurt Angle. At SummerSlam, The Rock defeated Triple H, and Angle in a Triple Threat match to retain the WWF Championship after Angle received a concussion at the hands of Triple H. Angle had started taking a liking to Triple H's on-screen wife, Stephanie McMahon, which made Triple H jealous of Angle. On the August 28 episode of Raw is War, Angle interfered in a match between Eddie Guerrero, and Triple H by attacking both men with a chair. Guerrero's valet, and Triple H's former on-screen girlfriend, the WWF Intercontinental Champion Chyna checked on both men, and hugged Triple H. On the August 31 episode of SmackDown!, Angle showed McMahon a video of Triple H, and Chyna hugging each other to create differences between Triple H, and McMahon. Later that night, Triple H was arrested by police officers before his scheduled match against Guerrero, and Angle. On the September 4 episode of Raw is War, Test was revealed to have complained to the officers to have Triple H arrested. On the September 11 episode of Raw is War, Angle interfered in Triple H's match with Chris Jericho, and distracted Triple H, causing Triple H to leave the ring, and chase Angle. Later that night, Angle attacked both Triple H and McMahon after his Handicap match against T & A (Test and Albert). As a result, the WWF Commissioner Mick Foley announced that Triple H and Angle would wrestle at Unforgiven.

At SummerSlam, Edge and Christian defeated Hardy Boyz (Matt Hardy and Jeff Hardy) and The Dudley Boyz (Bubba Ray Dudley and D-Von Dudley) in the first-ever Tables, Ladders and Chairs match to retain the WWF Tag Team Championship. The following night on Raw is War, Edge and Christian mocked Hardy Boyz and Dudley Boyz by bringing out four midgets portraying the Hardyz and the Dudleyz. This caused the Hardyz to come out and attack Edge and Christian. On the September 11 episode of Raw is War, the Hardy Boyz defeated the Dudley Boyz in a number one contender's match for the Tag Team Championship. On the September 14 episode of SmackDown!, the WWF Commissioner Mick Foley announced that Edge and Christian would defend the titles against Hardy Boyz in a steel cage match at Unforgiven.

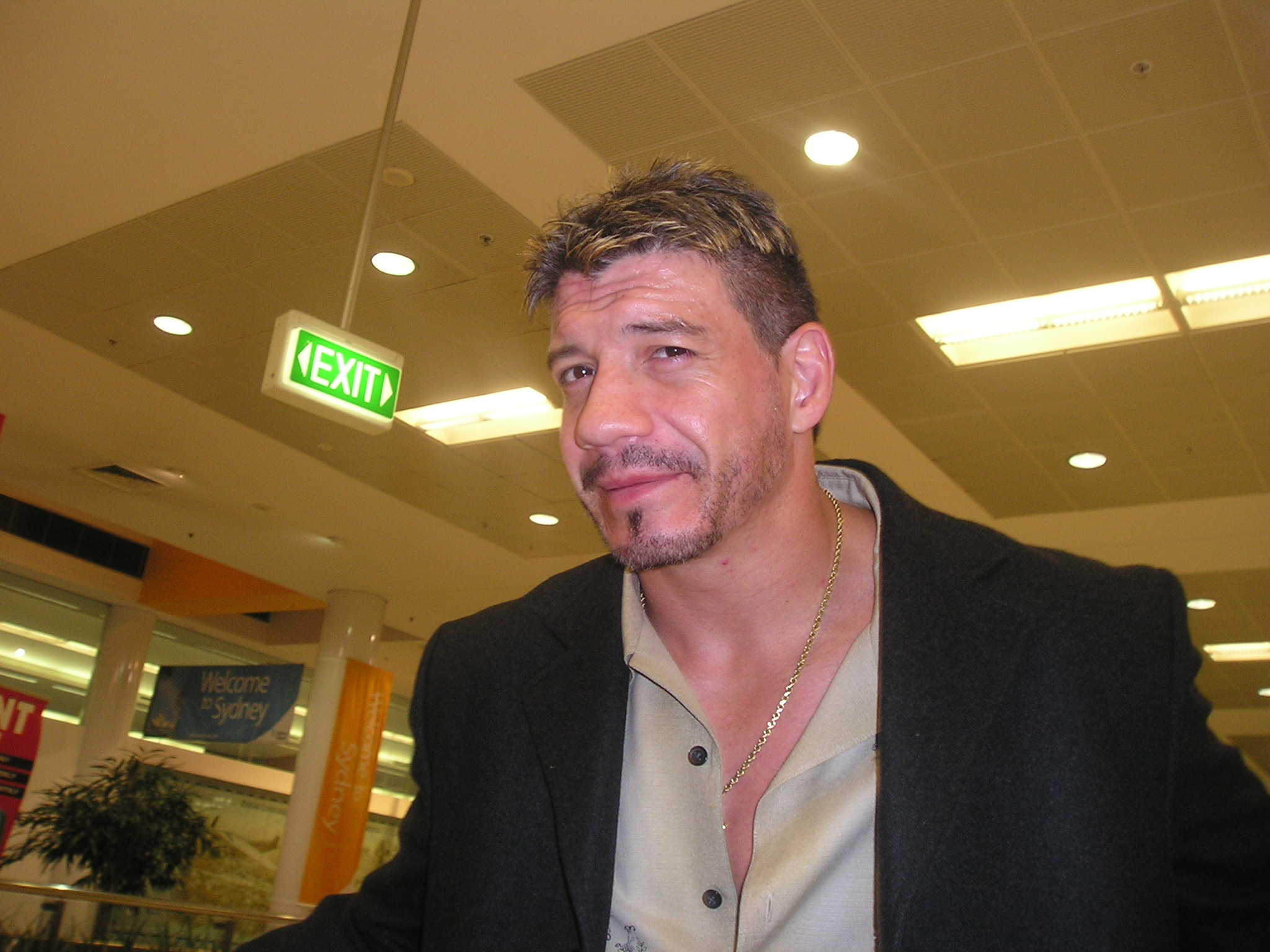
Eddie Guerrero defended the WWF Intercontinental Championship against Rikishi at Unforgiven.

At SummerSlam, Chyna and Eddie Guerrero defeated the WWF Intercontinental Champion Val Venis and Trish Stratus in a mixed tag team match by pinning Venis for his WWF Intercontinental Championship. The next night on Raw is War, Chyna and Guerrero involved themselves in a rivalry between Triple H and Kurt Angle as Guerrero and Triple H had a match, in which Angle interfered and attacked both men. After the match, Chyna and Triple H hugged. Angle tried to create differences between Chyna and Guerrero, leading to a title match between Chyna and Angle on the September 4 episode of Raw is War. However, Guerrero wanted to second Chyna but the WWF Commissioner inserted him into the Intercontinental Championship match, making it a Triple Threat match. Angle knocked out Chyna and Guerrero accidentally pinned her as he attempted to revive her. After the match, Chyna and Guerrero argued and Guerrero tried to return the belt to her but she refused and they hugged. It was followed by a vicious smile from Guerrero, creating the doubt that Guerrero was plotting this to win the title. He would follow by sneak attacks on Chyna's allies, Road Dogg and Too Cool (Scotty 2 Hotty and Grand Master Sexay). Following Guerrero's assault on Too Cool on the September 11 episode of Raw is War, Too Cool's ally Rikishi came to rescue the team but was attacked by Chyna. On the September 14 episode of SmackDown!, Guerrero cost the team of Rikishi and Scotty, a tag team match against Right to Censor (Val Venis and Steven Richards) by attacking Rikishi. This led to an Intercontinental Championship match between Guerrero and Rikishi at Unforgiven. Throughout all of this, tension was building between Eddie and Chyna, with Chyna being uncomfortable with Eddie cheating to retain his title, and Eddie being upset over Chyna posing for Playboy, even going to the Playboy Mansion to stop the photos from being released. On the September 18 episode of Raw, Eddie faked an illness to get out of a match with Rikishi, who ended up facing Chyna instead. Eddie would come down to the ringside at the start of the match and spray Rikishi in the eyes with mace. When Chyna attempted to check on him, Rikishi attacked her to goad Eddie into the ring and hit the Banzai Drop, but Eddie wouldn't make the save. On the September 21 episode of SmackDown, Eddie would apologize to Chyna for all the horrible things he had done over the past month, but Rikishi would expose Eddie with a security video of Eddie trying to break into Playboy Headquarters to stop Chyna's Playboy spread from being released. After seeing that video, a heartbroken Chyna was about to leave Eddie for good, but Eddie quickly pulled Chyna back into his clutches by proposing to her.

At SummerSlam, Jerry Lawler defeated Tazz in a standard wrestling match. The following night on Raw is War, Tazz had a scheduled WWF Hardcore Championship match against Steve Blackman. Tazz began attacking Lawler, causing Lawler and Jim Ross to interfere in the match and cost Tazz, the title opportunity against Blackman. On the August 31 episode of SmackDown!, Lawler cost Tazz a match against Chris Jericho. On the September 4 episode of Raw is War, Lawler and Jericho defeated Tazz and Mideon in a tag team match when Lawler pinned Tazz. After the match, Tazz attacked Lawler with a leather strap. On the September 11 episode of Raw is War, Lawler cost Tazz a WWF European Championship match against Al Snow and after the match, Tazz decided to quit WWF. However, on the September 14 episode of SmackDown, the WWF Commissioner Mick Foley convinced Tazz to stay in WWF and announced that Tazz would wrestle Lawler in a Strap match at Unforgiven.

On the September 7 episode of SmackDown!, X-Pac defeated Chris Jericho in a standard wrestling match. On the September 11 episode of Raw is War, X-Pac interfered in Jericho's match against Triple H by attacking Jericho and causing Triple H to get disqualified. Later that night, Jericho cost X-Pac, a WWF Hardcore Championship match against Steve Blackman. On the September 18 episode of Raw is War, Jericho ruined the returning Steven Regal's ceremony and X-Pac attacked Jericho from behind. This would lead to a match between Jericho and X-Pac at Unforgiven.

At SummerSlam, Right to Censor (Steven Richards, Bull Buchanan and The Goodfather) defeated Too Cool (Scotty 2 Hotty, Grand Master Sexay and Rikishi) in a six-man tag team match. On the August 31 episode of SmackDown!, RTC helped Val Venis in defeating Rikishi. On the September 11 episode of Raw is War, Goodfather and Buchanan defeated Acolytes Protection Agency (Faarooq and Bradshaw) in a tag team match. After the match, Venis attacked APA and joined RTC. On the September 18 episode of Raw is War, Goodfather and Buchanan defeated The Dudley Boyz (Bubba Ray Dudley and D-Von Dudley) in a tag team match in the same way. After the match, RTC began attacking Dudley Boyz until APA came out to rescue Dudley Boyz. This would lead to an eight-man tag team match between the team of APA and Dudley Boyz against Right to Censor at Unforgiven.

On the September 21 episode of SmackDown!, Steve Blackman defended the WWF Hardcore Championship against the WWF European Champion Al Snow. During the match, Funaki, Test, Perry Saturn and Crash Holly interfered and attacked Blackman to take advantage of the 24/7 rule. Blackman pinned Funaki to retain the title. This set up a title defense for Blackman against Funaki, Test, Saturn, Holly, and Snow in a Hardcore Battle Royal for the Hardcore Championship at Unforgiven.

On the September 7 episode of SmackDown!, "Stone Cold" Steve Austin, who had been out of action for almost ten months since he got run over by a car at the previous year's Survivor Series in Detroit, appeared in an interview and announced that he would be returning at Unforgiven to find out who ran over him.

== Event ==
Other on-screen personnel
Role:	Name:
English commentators	Jim Ross
English commentators	Jerry Lawler
English commentators	Michael Cole
Spanish commentators	Carlos Cabrera
Spanish commentators	Hugo Savinovich
Interviewers	Kevin Kelly
Interviewers	Michael Cole
Ring announcer	Howard Finkel
Referees	Mike Chioda
Referees	Jim Korderas
Referees	Earl Hebner
Referees	Jack Doan
Referees	Chad Patton
Referees	Tim White
Referees	Mike Sparks
Referees	Theodore Long

=== Preliminary matches ===
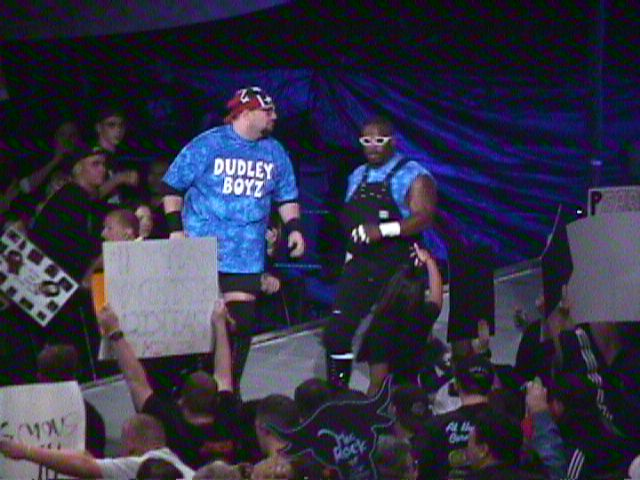
The Dudley Boyz (Bubba Ray and D-Von) teamed with Acolytes Protection Agency (Faarooq and Bradshaw) to wrestle Right to Censor (Steven Richards, Val Venis, Bull Buchanan, and The Goodfather) at Unforgiven.

The first match on the card was an eight-man tag team match pitting Right to Censor (Steven Richards, Val Venis, Bull Buchanan, and The Goodfather) against the team of The Dudley Boyz (Bubba Ray Dudley and D-Von Dudley), and Acolytes Protection Agency (Faarooq and Bradshaw). Richards did not tag into the match, but interfered in the match on several occasions. On one occasion, Dudley Boyz hit Venis with a Doomsday Device, which they called Dudleyville Device, and attempted to pin Venis, but Goodfather interfered and broke up the pinfall attempt. Richards interfered in the match and hit Bubba Ray with a Steven Kick, allowing Venis to pin Bubba Ray for the victory. However, after the match, the Dudley Boyz and Acolytes Protection Agency attacked Richards and slammed him through a table.

The second match was a Strap match between Tazz and Jerry Lawler. The first person to pin his opponent, make his opponent tap out, or touch all four corners of the ring would be declared the winner. Lawler attacked Tazz and beat him up, executing a Piledriver on Tazz three times. Lawler dragged Tazz around the ring to touch the ring corners. He touched the three corners but as Lawler was about to touch the fourth corner, the referee was knocked out. Lawler began choking Tazz until Raven debuted in the WWF and interfered in the match by hitting Lawler with his finisher, the Raven Effect. Tazz took advantage and applied the Tazzmission on Lawler. Lawler passed out to Tazz, giving Tazz the victory. After the match, "Stone Cold" Steve Austin returned to the WWF after a ten-month absence. He was last seen at Survivor Series, where he was run down by a car. He entered the arena and began questioning everyone to check who the culprit was that had run him down. Interviewer Kevin Kelly tried to interview Austin but Austin tossed Kelly into the wall.

Next was a Hardcore Battle Royal for the WWF Hardcore Championship. Steve Blackman defended the title against Test, Perry Saturn, Crash Holly, the WWF European Champion Al Snow and Funaki. The rules stated that the title would change hands throughout the match when a champion was pinned. The champion at the end of the time limit of the match–10 minutes, would be declared the final Hardcore Champion at Unforgiven. All the wrestlers attacked Blackman in an attempt to pin him. Holly successfully pinned Blackman to win the Hardcore Championship. He tried to escape with the title but was hit with a trashcan lid by Saturn, who pinned him for the title. Shortly after, Blackman grabbed his kendo stick and attacked all the other competitors in the match with it. The champion Saturn was one of them and Blackman pinned Saturn to win the Hardcore Championship and tried to escape to the locker room. All the wrestlers chased after him and began attacking him until the time limit expired. As a result, Blackman was declared the final champion for Unforgiven. After the match, Kurt Angle ran into "Stone Cold" Steve Austin in a backstage segment. Angle introduced himself to Austin and offered him an "honorary medal" but was attacked by Austin.

The fourth match was a standard wrestling match between Chris Jericho and X-Pac. The match went back and forth between the two as the two hit their cruiserweight style moves on each other. Jericho hit X-Pac's signature move Bronco Buster on X-Pac and then applied his finishing submission maneuver, an Elevated Boston Crab, which he calls Walls of Jericho. X-Pac tapped out to the hold but after the match, he attacked Jericho with a pair of nunchakus. After the match, Kurt Angle complained to the WWF Commissioner Mick Foley over "Stone Cold" Steve Austin's attack on him. This angered Foley and Foley made Angle's match with Triple H, a No Disqualification match. Later on, Austin approached The Rock in his locker room and the two exchanged words with each other until Joe interfered in their talk and was attacked by Austin.

Next was a steel cage match for the WWF Tag Team Championship. Edge and Christian defended the title against The Hardy Boyz (Matt Hardy and Jeff Hardy). To win, both members of a team had to escape the cage. As the match started, the two teams attacked each other until Jeff fell out of the cage. Matt was left alone and needed to escape the cage or pin either Edge or Christian to win the match. Edge and Christian took advantage of the situation and double-teamed Matt. Jeff tried to re-enter the cage but Christian knocked him out of the cage. Jeff knocked out the official outside the ring and took the key to the cage door and entered the cage but as he tried to enter the ring, Edge and Christian smashed his head with the cage. Edge took the key to the cage and dropped it under his tights. Matt started bleeding until Edge and Christian tried to hit Matt a Double chair shot but Matt avoided and hit a Double clothesline on Edge and Christian. Matt tried to take advantage by attempting to escape the cage. However, he was pulled back into the ring by Edge and Christian. Jeff grabbed a ladder and threw it on Christian, who was knocked off with the cage outside the ring. Jeff jumped onto the top of the cage through the ladder and delivered a Whisper in the Wind on both Edge and Matt from the top of the cage. Christian tried to climb the ladder but the Hardy Boyz' valet Lita delivered a Hurricanrana on Christian from the top of the ladder. Edge recovered and tried to escape the steel cage but Hardy Boyz hit him a Con-chair-to on the top of the cage, knocking him down on the mat. Hardy Boyz escaped the cage to win the Tag Team Championship.

=== Main event matches ===
After the WWF Tag Team Championship match, Stone Cold Steve Austin continued his search for the culprit and entered Stephanie McMahon's locker room. McMahon offered him the hat that he wore during the incident in which he was run down by a car. McMahon tried to convince Austin that neither she nor Triple H was the culprit. Austin refused to believe and left the locker room. In the next backstage segment, Triple H confronted the WWF Commissioner Mick Foley. Foley announced that he would be the special guest referee for Triple H's match with Kurt Angle, later in the night.

The sixth match featured Eddie Guerrero defending the WWF Intercontinental Championship against Rikishi. Guerrero tried to escape to the locker room but his valet Chyna prevented him from escaping and threw him back into the ring. Rikishi began beating on Guerrero and had nearly finished him after keeping him in the position of Stink Face. However, as Rikishi attempted to hit the move, Chyna pulled Guerrero out of the ring. Rikishi confronted Chyna and Guerrero took advantage by splashing Rikishi from the top rope. Rikishi hit Guerrero with a Seated Senton, which he called Banzai Drop and had pinned Guerrero until Chyna interfered on Guerrero's behalf, causing Rikishi to attack Chyna. As a result, Rikishi was disqualified but he continued to attack Chyna by hitting her with a Savate Kick and a Banzai Drop from the second rope.

The final match on the undercard was a No Disqualification match between Triple H and Kurt Angle. WWF Commissioner Mick Foley served as the special guest referee. Before the match began, Angle announced that it was Stephanie McMahon's birthday and led the people into singing a rendition of "Happy Birthday to You". McMahon came out with Triple H to manage him. Angle began attacking Triple H's injured ribs and focused on them. Triple H attempted to hit a Pedigree on Angle on the main announce table. However, Angle reversed it and hit a Belly to Belly Suplex on Triple H on the Spanish announce table. Foley offered Triple H to quit the match but Triple H opted to continue the match. Angle continued to injure Triple H's ribs. After Angle missed a Moonsault from the top rope, Triple H tried to hit a Pedigree until McMahon entered the ring and low blowed Angle, allowing Triple H to hit Angle with a Pedigree for the victory. After the match, Shane McMahon returned after being injured at SummerSlam and tried to blame Steve Blackman for being the attacker of "Stone Cold" Steve Austin. However, Blackman came out to prove his innocence but before he could speak, "Stone Cold" Steve Austin came out and performed his Stone Cold Stunner on Blackman. Austin and McMahon began celebrating and drinking beers until Austin gave McMahon three Stone Cold Stunners.

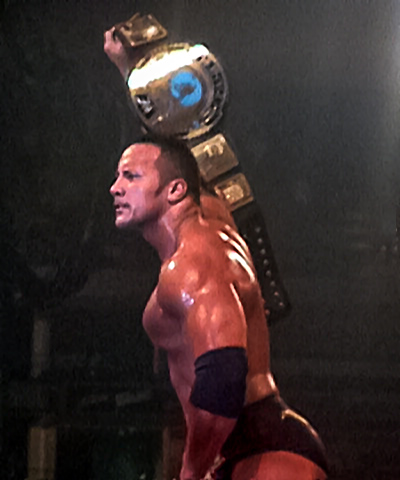
The Rock defended the WWF Championship in a fatal four-way match at Unforgiven.

The main event was a Fatal Four-Way match for the WWF Championship. The Rock defended the title against Chris Benoit, Kane and The Undertaker. As the match began, The Rock battled Kane and Benoit fought with The Undertaker. After taking down Kane and Benoit, The Rock and The Undertaker battled each other until they were attacked by Kane and Benoit. Benoit and The Rock battled to the outside until Kane made the first pinfall attempt of the match on The Undertaker after hitting him a Flying Clothesline but got a near-fall. The match went back and forth until Benoit hit The Undertaker with a chair and pinned him to win the match and become the new WWF Champion. However, The Undertaker's foot was on the bottom rope and the official was groggy, so he counted the fall. The WWF Commissioner Mick Foley reversed the decision and restarted the match. Benoit was attacked by all three competitors on numerous occasions until all four competitors continued to attack each other. Benoit attacked Kane and The Undertaker outside the ring with a chair and returned to the ring to apply his submission maneuver, the Crippler Crossface on The Rock. Benoit had nearly defeated The Rock until The Undertaker entered the ring and began stomping Benoit. The Undertaker followed by chokeslamming Benoit but before he could make a pinfall, Kane pulled him outside the ring and battled with The Undertaker. The Rock took advantage and hit Benoit with a Rock Bottom, to win the match and retain the WWF Championship.

== Aftermath ==
The following night, on the September 25 episode of Raw is War, The Rock, and Triple H exchanged rivals with Chris Benoit, and Kurt Angle as Triple H, and Stephanie McMahon came out to check on a knocked out Shane McMahon during a WWF Championship match between Rock, and Benoit. Benoit attacked Triple H, while Angle also started attacking Triple H until Rock tried to rescue Triple H, but failed as Benoit, and Angle attacked both men. On the October 2 episode of Raw is War, Angle defeated Triple H to become the number one contender for the WWF title, and eventually defeated Rock at No Mercy for his first WWF Championship. Since Triple H was defeated due to interference by Benoit, the two wrestled in a match at No Mercy, which Triple H won.

The Hardy Boyz (Matt Hardy and Jeff Hardy) continued their rivalry with Edge and Christian over the WWF Tag Team Championship, leading to the controversial Los Conquistadores storyline. Los Conquistadores attacked Hardy Boyz on numerous occasions, and became the number one contenders for the tag titles by winning a tag team battle royal on the October 19 episode of SmackDown. At No Mercy, Los Conquistadores defeated Hardy Boyz for the Tag Team Championship. The following night on Raw is War, Los Conquistadores defeated Edge, and Christian to retain the titles, but unmasked themselves after the match to reveal Hardy Boyz. Hardy Boyz revealed that Edge, and Christian were wearing the golden costumes, and masks the entire time, but in some segments, gave it to their hired goons, which featured Edge, and Christian talking to Los Conquistadores.

"Stone Cold" continued to search for his attacker. On the October 5 episode of SmackDown!, Commissioner Mick Foley suspended Austin for interfering in matches, and took over interrogating members of the roster to find out who ran over him. On the October 9 episode of Raw is War, Rock's cousin, Rikishi confessed to running over Austin after Scotty 2 Hotty told Foley that they were in Detroit partying at the time; Foley soon realized that Rikishi hadn't made his debut at the time. Rikishi then said he did it for the Rock, and the people because the WWF had always held back members of the Anoaʻi family. After that, Rikishi turned heel. On the October 12 episode of SmackDown!, Foley announced that Austin and Rikishi would battle each other in a No Holds Barred match at No Mercy at the Pepsi Arena in Albany, New York. On the October 16 episode of Raw is War, "Stone Cold" returned to Detroit at the Joe Louis Arena and was being interviewed by Michael Cole when Rikishi interrupted him when he appeared on the titantron, telling Austin to come fight him at the same parking lot of the arena where he ran Austin over. When Austin exited the arena and got to the parking lot, he couldn't find him, but when Austin got closer, Rikishi drove up after destroying some boxes and attempted to run over Austin again, but he got out of the way just in time and he told Austin to be at No Mercy on Sunday. On the October 19 episode of SmackDown!, while Austin was being interviewed by his close friend Jim Ross, Rikishi appeared in the parking garage of the arena and smashed up "Stone Cold"'s Ford F-150 pickup truck and was found out by Jonathan Coachman and when Austin and Ross went to the garage, Austin saw his truck destroyed and then saw a car, believing that Rikishi was in it, left the arena and gave chase, but Rikishi still appeared and attacked J.R., then was ordered by Foley to leave the arena. When Austin found out that J.R. was assaulted and Edge, Christian and X-Pac making fun of him, Austin interrupted the match, and attacked them, Chris Jericho and The Hardy Boyz. At No Mercy, Austin and Rikishi fought in a No Holds Barred match, which was deemed a no contest after Austin was arrested by Albany police when he tried to run over Rikishi, but Foley later bailed him out.

== Reception ==
In 2008, J.D. Dunn of 411Mania gave the event a rating of 4.5 [Poor], stating, "Proving that even the beloved Chris Kreski wasn't infallible, this show fell about as flat as you can get for such a hot lead-up. Benoit forgot about being screwed out of the title twice and focused on beating up Stephanie. Austin didn't figure out who ran him over. It was just sort of revealed one night. Angle would go on to claim the title, but he was immediately demoted to #2 heel when Triple H revealed he tried to have Austin killed. You can see the cracks in the empire beginning to show, and it's not surprising that ratings started to sink later in the year. Thumbs down for Unforgiven 2000."

== Results ==
No.	Results	Stipulations	Times
1	Right to Censor (Bull Buchanan, The Goodfather, Steven Richards and Val Venis) defeated The APA (Bradshaw and Faarooq) and The Dudley Boyz (Bubba Ray Dudley and D-Von Dudley)	Eight-man tag team match	6:05
2	Tazz defeated Jerry Lawler by technical submission	Strap match	5:07
3	Steve Blackman (c) won by last defeating Perry Saturn (with Terri) (Note: The other participants were: Crash Holly, Al Snow, Funaki, and Test (with Trish Stratus).)	10 Minute Open Invitational WWF Hardcore Championship	10:00
4	Chris Jericho defeated X-Pac by submission	Singles match	9:05
5	The Hardy Boyz (Jeff Hardy and Matt Hardy) (with Lita) defeated Edge and Christian (c) by escaping the cage	Steel Cage match for the WWF Tag Team Championship	14:00
6	Eddie Guerrero (c) (with Chyna) defeated Rikishi by disqualification	Singles match for the WWF Intercontinental Championship	6:10
7	Triple H (with Stephanie McMahon-Helmsley) defeated Kurt Angle	No Disqualification match with Mick Foley as special guest referee	17:28
8	The Rock (c) defeated Chris Benoit, Kane and The Undertaker	Fatal 4-Way match for the WWF Championship	16:03
(c) / – the champion(s) heading into the match

Hardcore Championship battle royal title changes
Number	New Champion	Method	Time
1	Crash Holly	Pinned Steve Blackman after a Big Boot into a trash can lid from Test	03:54
2	Perry Saturn	Pinned Crash Holly after hitting him with a trash can lid	04:06
3	Steve Blackman	Pinned Perry Saturn after hitting him with a kendo stick	09:01
