= Acolytes Protection Agency =

Professional wrestling tag team

- Acolytes Protection Agency Logo

Tag team
- Name(s): The APA/A.P.A. The Acolytes; The Acolytes Protection Agency; The Hell's Henchmen
- Members: John "Bradshaw" Layfield; Ron "Faarooq" Simmons
- Billed heights: Faarooq: 6 ft 2 in (1.88 m); Bradshaw: 6 ft 6 in (1.98 m)
- Combined billed weight: 565 lb (256 kg); Faarooq (275 lbs), Bradshaw (290 lbs)
- Former members: The Jackyl (manager)
- Debut: November 15, 1998
- Years active: 1998–2002; 2003–2004; 2007–present (non-wrestling reunions)

The Acolytes Protection Agency (APA) was an American professional wrestling tag team who consisted of John Layfield (best known as Bradshaw) and Ron Simmons (best known as Farooq). They wrestled in the World Wrestling Federation/Entertainment (WWF/E) between October 1998 and March 2004.

Before forming the APA, Faarooq and Bradshaw were known simply as The Acolytes and went on to become a part of The Undertaker's Ministry of Darkness. As The Acolytes, they won the WWF Tag Team Championship twice in 1999, while feuding with X-Pac and Kane and the Hardy Boyz. After renaming themselves the Acolytes Protection Agency in 2000, they adopted the gimmick of bodyguards-for-hire to other wrestlers, and won a third WWF Tag Team Championship in 2001.

In 2002, the brand split also split the duo as the 2002 draft sent Faarooq to SmackDown! and Bradshaw to Raw. As a singles competitor, Bradshaw had an extensive hardcore wrestling career, winning the Hardcore Championship on various occasions. The two reunited as a tag team in Ohio Valley Wrestling and then on SmackDown! in 2003. The team again split in 2004 when Simmons was getting ready to retire, and as part of Bradshaw's heel turn Simmons was on-screen released by WWE; Bradshaw continued his singles career before retiring in 2009, and the group has made sporadic appearances afterwards, mostly in a non-competing capacity.

== History ==
=== The Acolytes (1998–2000) ===
As single competitors in the World Wrestling Federation, Bradshaw and Faarooq's careers had stalled. WWF management then placed them in a tag team called The Hell's Henchmen managed by The Jackyl. Both men made their first appearance on TV as a team on the November 15, 1998, episode of Sunday Night Heat attacking 8-Ball, Skull and Paul Ellering as the D.O.A. came down to the ring for a match. The following week on Sunday Night Heat, The Jackyl came down to the ring as the duo interrupted a match and proclaimed Bradshaw and Faarooq to be his Acolytes. Both men made their official tag team debut on the November 30, 1998, episode of Raw is War, when they attacked Tiger Ali Singh and his manager, Babu, after Singh's match against Val Venis. The team was notorious for their intense and brutal beatings done during the ensuing matches. Afterwards, they won tag team matches against the team of Venis and The Godfather and the team of The J.O.B. Squad.

When The Jackyl left the WWF, the duo joined The Undertaker's new heel stable, the Ministry of Darkness. They debuted in Undertaker's Ministry on the January 11, 1999, episode of Raw, recruited Dennis Knight into the Ministry, giving him the name Mideon. After Undertaker's Ministry merged with The Corporation to form the Corporate Ministry, the Acolytes began a feud with X-Pac and Kane over the WWF World Tag Team Championship. The feud began on the May 30, 1999, episode of Sunday Night Heat with the Acolytes attacking X-Pac after his match against Big Boss Man. Their attack was to no avail, however, as Kane, X-Pac's tag team partner, came down to the ring to attack the Acolytes. Later that night, the Acolytes challenged X-Pac and Kane for a WWF Tag Team Championship match on the following Raw broadcast. The following night on Raw, X-Pac and Kane accepted the challenge. During the match, however, Shane McMahon, who was also a member of the Corporate Ministry, interfered in the match, causing Kane to chase McMahon to the backstage area. The situation allowed Bradshaw to hit X-Pac with a Clothesline from Hell into a pinfall, allowing the Acolytes to win their first WWF Tag Team Championship.

The Acolytes then began a feud with the Hardy Boyz, who had defeated The Brood at King of the Ring to become the number one contenders to the Acolytes' WWF Tag Team Championship. The feud intensified on the July 3, 1999, episode of Shotgun Saturday Night, when the Acolytes attacked the Hardy Boyz during a segment. On the July 5, 1999, episode of Raw, however, the Acolytes lost the WWF Tag Team Championship to the Hardy Boyz, after Jeff attacked Bradshaw with Michael Hayes's, the Hardy Boyz's manager, cane, and Matt delivered a Tornado DDT on Bradshaw into a pinfall. The Acolytes regained the WWF Tag Team Championship at Fully Loaded in a No Disqualification Handicap match against the Hardy Boyz and Hayes.

After regaining the championship, the Acolytes began another feud with Kane with various partners. On the August 8, 1999, episode of Sunday Night Heat, Kane teamed up with Road Dogg to face the Acolytes for the WWF Tag Team Championship, in a losing effort. The following night on Raw, Kane then teamed up with X-Pac to face the Acolytes in another championship match, in which X-Pac delivered an X-Factor to Faarooq into the pinfall, which meant that the Acolytes lost the title. The following week, they lost a rematch for the WWF Tag Team Championship. After losing their rematch, they won a Tag Team Turmoil match at SummerSlam to become number one contenders for the WWF Tag Team Championship but their title match against The Big Show and The Undertaker ended in a no-contest. After this, they feuded with the Dudley Boyz and defeated them at Unforgiven. The Acolytes then developed a gimmick as card players and beer drinkers, hustling many wrestlers and WWF employees out of their money.

After sporadic feuds, the Acolytes won a tag team battle royal at Armageddon against seven other tag teams to win a WWF Tag Team Championship match. They were unable to win the championship at the Royal Rumble, as the New Age Outlaws defeated them, after Billy Gunn performed a Fame-ass-er on Bradshaw, after interference from X-Pac.

=== Acolytes Protection Agency (2000–2002) ===
Farooq and Bradshaw as the APA.

According to Layfield, he got drunk during a party for his birthday in Baltimore, and Vince and Shane McMahon saw him. They found it funny, so they asked both of them to portray a similar, beer drinking character on TV, just sitting around, playing cards, drinking beer and getting into fights backstage and in bars. Upon being told this, Simmons said it was “the best idea I’ve ever heard”, as both Layfield and Simmons liked to participate in the APA's social activities in real life, so both talents felt at home. On the January 31, 2000, episode of Raw, the Mean Street Posse asked the Acolytes to protect them, which they refused to do, until the Posse offered to pay them. When they did, Bradshaw started the Acolytes Protection Agency (APA). Behind the scenes, the gimmick of the tag team was also created by John Layfield. To further enhance their mercenary gimmick, the APA began to appear weekly backstage in an "office," dubbed the APA Office. The office was a free-standing door and frame, with the letters 'A.P.A.' written in magic marker on a piece of typing paper. A running gag consisted of Faarooq and Bradshaw seated at a table playing cards with the door open. When a wrestler would appear to hire their services, they would admonish the potential customer for either not knocking on the door, walking around the door frame, or not closing the door on the way out. The APA would only accept cash or beer in payment for protection work. After protecting many WWF superstars, the APA began a feud with Bull Buchanan and Big Bossman. On the April 10, 2000, episode of Raw, the APA protected Kai En Tai during a match, when they were attacked by Buchanan and Bossman. The APA, however, was unsuccessful in winning a tag team match against them at Backlash. On the May 18, 2000, episode of SmackDown!, the APA were hired to protect Crash Holly for an hour, to prevent him from losing his WWF Hardcore Championship. After the hour was up, the APA left, allowing Gerald Brisco to pin Holly for the Hardcore Championship. The situation resulted in Holly challenging Bradshaw in a Hardcore match, which Bradshaw won. Later that week on SmackDown!, Faarooq defeated Holly in a Hardcore match.

On the June 26, 2000, episode of Raw, the APA won a Tag-Team Battle Royal against seven other teams to earn an opportunity at the WWF Tag Team Championship. During the weeks leading up to Fully Loaded, Edge and Christian avoided defending the Tag Team Championship against the APA by challenging their opponents to one-on-one matches: on the July 10, 2000, episode of Raw, Edge defeated Bradshaw, while on SmackDown! later that week, Christian was defeated by Faarooq. At Fully Loaded, the APA defeated Edge and Christian by disqualification but due to WWF rules, Edge and Christian retained the Tag Team Championship.

On the September 7, 2000, episode of SmackDown!, the Dudley Boyz and the APA formed an alliance. The following week on Raw, the APA faced Right to Censor (Bull Buchanan and The Goodfather) in a losing effort. Then, on the September 18, 2000, episode of Raw, the APA come out to help the Dudley Boyz against an assault by all the members of the Right to Censor. At Unforgiven, The Dudley Boyz and the APA lost an Eight-man Tag Team match against Right to Censor.

After sporadic feuds through midway 2001, the APA were awarded a WWF Tag Team Championship match against the Dudley Boyz. On the July 9, 2001, episode of Raw, Bradshaw pinned D-Von to win their third WWF Tag Team Championship. The following month on SmackDown!, however, the APA lost the WWF Tag Team Championship to Kanyon and Diamond Dallas Page, one of the invading WCW wrestlers in The Alliance stable. After losing the Tag Team Championship, Faarooq was briefly absent, while Bradshaw pursued singles championships: on the September 27, 2001, episode of SmackDown!, Bradshaw lost a WWF Intercontinental Championship match against Christian. On the October 22, 2001, episode of Raw, Bradshaw defeated The Hurricane to win the WWF European Championship. When Faarooq returned, Bradshaw lost the European Championship to Christian on the November 1, 2001, episode of SmackDown!. At No Way Out, the APA won a Tag Team Turmoil match to win a WWF Tag Team Championship match at WrestleMania X8. The APA were unsuccessful in winning the Tag Team Championship on two occasions: on the February 28, 2002, episode of SmackDown! and at WrestleMania X8.

=== Initial separation (2002) ===
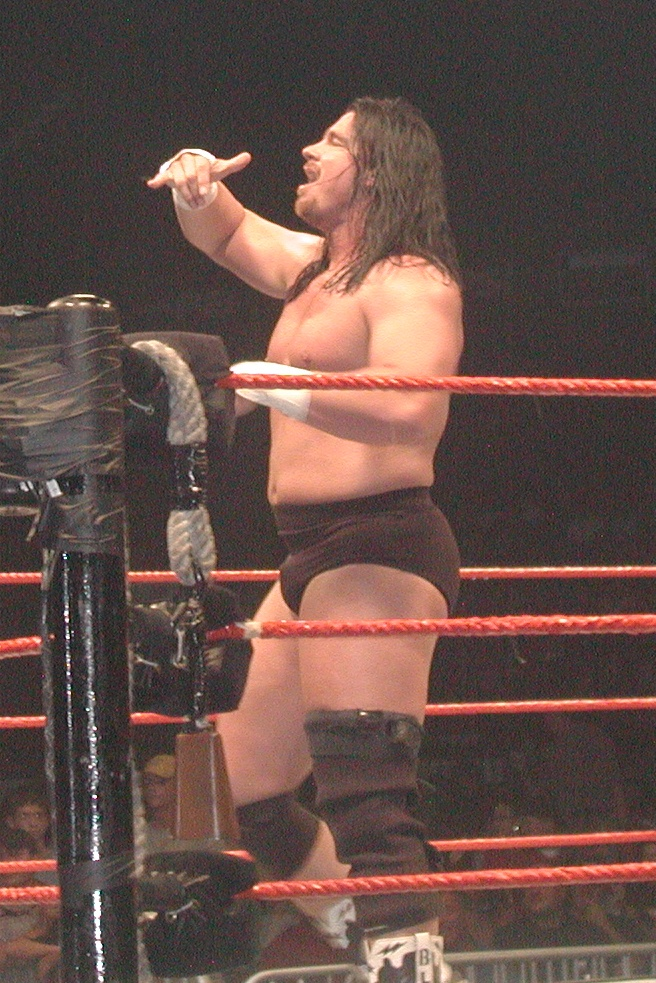
Bradshaw in 2002 after the A.P.A. split

On March 25, 2002, the APA were split up when the WWF roster was divided into the Raw and SmackDown! brands. Bradshaw was drafted to Raw, while Faarooq was drafted to SmackDown!. On the Raw brand, Bradshaw won the WWF Hardcore Championship eighteen times, and went back to his Blackjack Texan gimmick, while Faarooq – now wrestling under his real name – had a brief stint with the SmackDown! brand, teaming with Reverend D-Von in a tournament to determine the newly created WWE Tag Team Champions. In September 2002, Bradshaw was injured and was inactive for six months.

=== Return to SmackDown (2003–2004) ===
After their brief single careers, Bradshaw and Simmons reunited in WWE's former farm territory, Ohio Valley Wrestling in March 2003, winning the OVW Southern Tag Team Championship on April 10. They vacated the OVW title when they returned to WWE television on the June 19 episode of SmackDown! to assist The Undertaker in an ambush from the F.B.I. During their return, they revived their former gimmick of beer drinking and card playing segments in backstage areas. Bradshaw had a new look as he had a shorter hair style, debuted a clean shaven look and went to his natural hair color. At Vengeance on July 27, the APA hosted a Bar Room Brawl, which Bradshaw won. On the September 4 episode of SmackDown!, the APA were booked in a WWE Tag Team Championship match against the defending champions, The World's Greatest Tag Team (Charlie Haas and Shelton Benjamin), which the APA lost. After sporadic tag team matches, the APA was once again booked in a WWE Tag Team Championship match at WrestleMania XX on March 14, 2004, in a Fatal-Four way tag team match also involving the World's Greatest Tag Team, Rikishi and Scotty 2 Hotty, and the Basham Brothers, which Rikishi and Scotty won to retain the WWE Tag Team Championship. On the March 18 episode of SmackDown!, the APA angered SmackDown! general manager Paul Heyman by mocking his being Stunned by Stone Cold Steve Austin the previous week; Heyman ordered them to face Rikishi and Scotty 2 Hotty with the APA's jobs on the line. After the APA was defeated, Heyman only fired Faarooq and told Bradshaw to worry about his own career, calling him a valued asset to the company and noting his role as a published author and a Fox financial analyst. While Bradshaw stayed, Faarooq left in disgust. The angle covered Simmons' real-life retirement from professional wrestling.

=== Non-wrestling reunions and legacy (2007–present) ===
Two years later in 2006, Layfield was injured and became a commentator for SmackDown. Bradshaw returned to wrestling in 2007, on the Raw brand, while Simmons began cutting promos with his trademark catchphrase, "Damn!".

The APA had an in-ring reunion on the December 3, 2007, episode of Raw when Hornswoggle hired their protection services for his handicap match against Jonathan Coachman and Carlito.

Simmons and Layfield reunited for Raw 1000 on July 23, 2012, when they provided protection for Lita during her brief match with Heath Slater. Layfield attacked Slater with a Clothesline from Hell, and after the match, Simmons simply said his trademark catchphrase, "Damn."

The APA again reunited on the January 19, 2015, episode of Raw (dubbed Raw Reunion due to numerous special appearances by various WWE Hall of Famers and Legends), alongside the New Age Outlaws, saving the New World Order (nWo) members from The Ascension, during which Layfield attacked Ascension member Viktor with a Clothesline from Hell.

On April 2, 2016, the APA inducted The Godfather into the WWE Hall of Fame. They returned the following year, on March 31, 2017, to induct Theodore Long into the WWE Hall of Fame.

On January 22, 2018, the APA appeared backstage hosting a poker game during WWE Raw 25 Years.

On the October 23, 2020, episode of SmackDown, both Simmons and Layfield, along with Hall of Famer Theodore Long appeared in a court-like segment named Law and Otis wherein debates are tackled between Otis and The Miz for the Money In The Bank contract.

Since October 17, 2022, Layfield, now a manager for Baron Corbin, had been frequently shown doing poker matches backstage with Akira Tozawa.

On January 23, 2023, Layfield and Simmons once again appeared backstage for Raw is XXX to celebrate the 30th anniversary of Monday Night Raw, the pair once again hosted poker matches.

On the 2023 WWE Hall of Fame ceremony, Layfield and Simmons appeared to award Tim White with the Warrior Award. White's brothers, Tom and Pat, accepted the award.

Layfield and Simmons reunited again on Night 2 of the 2024 WWE Draft, with Layfield selecting draft picks for the Raw brand, and Simmons selecting draft picks for the SmackDown brand.

== Championships and accomplishments ==
- Memphis Championship Wrestling
  - MCW Southern Tag Team Championship (1 time)
- Ohio Valley Wrestling
  - OVW Southern Tag Team Championship (1 time)
- World Wrestling Federation/World Wrestling Entertainment
  - WWF European Championship (1 time) – Bradshaw
  - WWF Tag Team Championship (3 times)
  - WWE Hall of Fame (Class of 2012) – Faarooq (as Ron Simmons)
  - WWE Hall of Fame (Class of 2020) – Bradshaw (as John "Bradshaw" Layfield)
