= Right to Censor =

Professional wrestling stable

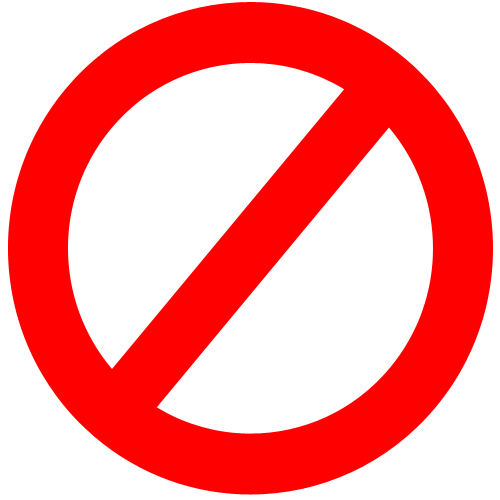

Stable
- Leader: Steven Richards
- Members: Bull Buchanan; The Goodfather; Val Venis; Ivory; The Kat
- Debut: July 17, 2000
- Disbanded: June 14, 2001
- Years active: 2000–2001

The Right to Censor (frequently referred to as RTC) was a villainous professional wrestling stable in the World Wrestling Federation (WWF, now known as WWE) from mid-2000 to mid 2001. The group was a parody of the Parents Television Council (PTC), which was protesting the level of violence and sexual content in WWF programming, and threatening to boycott several of their sponsors.

Throughout the stable's existence, the team had held the WWF Tag Team Championship (Buchanan and Goodfather) and the WWF Women's Championship (Ivory). The group feuded with several WWF wrestlers such as The Undertaker and The Rock. Right to Censor was ultimately dismantled by The Undertaker in April 2001, two months before its final dissolution.

== Characters ==
The Right to Censor gimmick was a parody of the Parents Television Council (PTC) which actively campaigned against the company’s product in 1999. Its uniform was a white button up shirt and black tie, with black slacks for the men (although Val Venis wore white slacks on occasion) and a long black skirt for the women. Eventually Ivory, the only woman officially recruited to the group, was forced to adopt the black slacks out of necessity, due to the skirt limiting her in-ring abilities.

Entrances of RTC members were accompanied not by the standard musical theme but by the sound of shrill alarms and buzzers, with an underlying swing jazz beat, along with a monotone voice repeating the word "warning" over and over again.

== History ==
=== Formation and feuds ===
The group was formed in July 2000 when wrestler Steven Richards began to randomly appear on WWF programming to cover up the bodies of scantily clad women or remove "hardcore" weapons such as tables from matches. He apparently took offense to the Acolytes' rowdy reputation and disapproved of the Dudleys' use of tables. He was eventually joined by Bull Buchanan, The Goodfather (formerly the Godfather), Val Venis, and Ivory. The group temporarily forced The Kat into its fold, but The Kat and the WWF parted ways before that storyline could completely play itself out. Before being forced into the group, The Kat was starting a group called Right to Nudity, which was to play on The Kat's infamous pay-per-view stunt where she appeared completely topless. Her group was what brought her to Right to Censor's attention.

The Right to Censor came out victorious in at least one match of every pay-per-view they participated in from mid-2000 to early 2001. At SummerSlam on August 27, Richards, Buchanan, and The Goodfather won a 6-man tag match against Too Cool (Grandmaster Sexay and Scotty 2 Hotty) and Rikishi. At the next pay-per-view, Unforgiven on September 24, the RTC (now with Val Venis) won an 8-man tag match against the APA and the Dudley Boyz. Even though The Goodfather and Bull Buchanan lost the Dudley Invitational at No Mercy on October 22, Venis and Richards managed to defeat Chyna and Mr. Ass in a tag match. When WWF Women's Champion Ivory joined the group, she won 3 pay-per-view matches in a row for the group. She defeated Lita in a title match at Survivor Series on November 19 while The Goodfather and Buchanan lost a Survivor Series Elimination Match. The next month, at Armageddon on December 10, Ivory came out victorious once again in a triple-threat title match against Molly Holly and Trish Stratus, and Val Venis also was victorious over Chyna. Meanwhile, Buchanan and The Goodfather continued the losing streak when they lost the WWF Tag Team Championship to Edge and Christian in a Fatal Four-Way tag match. At the Royal Rumble on January 21, 2001, Ivory once again retained her title by defeating Chyna; on the other hand, Buchanan, The Goodfather, and Venis all failed in their attempt to win the Royal Rumble Match. The following month at No Way Out on February 25, it marked the last time the RTC won a match at a pay-per-view when Steven Richards defeated Jerry Lawler.

The group had a moderate level of success, with Buchanan and The Goodfather holding the WWF Tag Team Championship and Ivory capturing the WWF Women's Championship before entering into a high-profile feud with Chyna.

=== Split and future ===
WrestleMania X-Seven on April 1 was the symbolic end of the Right to Censor, as the stable lost all of the matches in which they were scheduled to participate: Buchanan, Venis, and The Goodfather lost a 6-man tag match against the APA and Tazz, while Ivory lost her title to Chyna.

On the April 26 episode of WWF SmackDown!, Richards, Buchanan, Val Venis, and The Goodfather faced The Undertaker in a 4-on-1 handicap match. The group was finally disbanded when Steven Richards was hit with the Last Ride by The Undertaker. The Goodfather, Buchanan and Val Venis all walked out and left him lying in the ring. The group's last match was contested on the May 24 episode of SmackDown!, when Buchanan, The Goodfather and Ivory lost to Steve Blackman, Grand Master Sexay and Trish Stratus in a tag match. Then Ivory and Richards made an appearance for Memphis Championship Wrestling losing to Rodrageous and Victoria on June 14, 2001. Following this match, RTC was officially disbanded, with Ivory appearing for the last time under the Right to Censor gimmick on the June 16 episode of Metal.

Ivory and Richards returned as members of The Alliance during the Invasion angle while Venis and Goodfather returned at the 2002 Royal Rumble under their old personas. Steven Richards adopted a psychotic gimmick while Bull Buchanan was briefly rebranded as B^{2} (B-Squared) in 2002 and made a bodyguard for John Cena before departing the WWE in January 2003. The rest of the group reverted to their previous personas before the advent of the faction. Godfather was released in 2002 (and later inducted into the WWE Hall of Fame in 2016), Ivory in 2005 (inducted into the Hall of Fame in 2018), Richards in 2008 and Venis in 2009.

The Right to Censor gimmick returned for one night at the 2022 Royal Rumble, when Ivory made a guest appearance in the women's Royal Rumble match. Ivory's participation primarily consisted of her cutting a promo deriding the roster's unladylike behaviour; she lasted thirty seconds in the match before being eliminated by Rhea Ripley. Buchanan's son, Benjamin, who wrestles as Brooks Jensen, is now signed with the company and, as of 2026, currently performs in its NXT developmental brand.

The righttocensor.com domain remained active for 19 years even after the group's dissolution; until mid-2002, the address redirected to WWF's/WWE's Superstars website, before WWE lost the domain to squatters. For unknown reasons, an unknown individual acquired the former website's domain in July 2020 and redirects the righttocensor.com domain to rival All Elite Wrestling (AEW)'s website.

== Championships and accomplishments ==
- World Wrestling Federation
  - WWF Tag Team Championship (1 time) – Buchanan and Goodfather
  - WWF Women's Championship (1 time) – Ivory
