= List of WWE European Champions =

Listing of professional wrestling champions for the European Championship

The WWE European Championship is a former professional wrestling title competed for in World Wrestling Entertainment (WWE). The title was created on February 26, 1997 under the name of the WWF European Championship. The first champion was The British Bulldog who defeated Owen Hart in a tournament final. The title was retired briefly in April 1999 by then-champion Shane McMahon, who wanted to retire as an "undefeated champion". McMahon reintroduced the championship two months later and gave it to Mideon, who saw the title belt in Shane's travel bag and asked if he could have it. The title was finally retired on July 22, 2002, when WWE Intercontinental Champion Rob Van Dam defeated European Champion Jeff Hardy to unify the European title into the Intercontinental title. Throughout the five year, four month, and 26 day history of the title, there were 27 recognized champions and 37 distinct championship reigns. This is a chronological list of wrestlers that have been WWE European Champion by ring name.

== Reigns ==
=== Names ===
Name	Years
WWF European Championship	February 26, 1997 – May 6, 2002
WWE European Championship	May 6, 2002 – July 22, 2002

=== Reigns ===
Key
No.	Overall reign number
Reign	Reign number for the specific champion
Days	Number of days held
Days recog.	Number of days held recognized by the promotion
<1	Reign lasted less than a day

No.	Champion	Championship change			Reign statistics			Notes	Ref.
No.	Champion	Date	Event	Location	Reign	Days	Days recog.	Notes	Ref.
World Wrestling Federation (WWF)
1	The British Bulldog	February 26, 1997	Raw	Berlin, Germany	1	206	205	Defeated Owen Hart in a tournament final to become the first champion. Aired on tape delay on March 3, 1997.	
2	Shawn Michaels	September 20, 1997	One Night Only	Birmingham, England	1	82	92	WWE recognizes Michaels' reign as ending on December 22, 1997, when the following episode aired on tape delay.	
3	Triple H	December 11, 1997	Raw	Lowell, MA	1	40	30	WWE recognizes Triple H's reign as beginning on December 22, 1997, when the episode aired on tape delay.	
4	Owen Hart	January 20, 1998	Raw	Davis, CA	1	55	52	Defeated The Artist Formerly Known As Goldust, who was dressed as Triple H. WWE recognizes Hart's reign as beginning on January 22, when the episode aired on tape delay.	
5	Triple H	March 16, 1998	Raw	Phoenix, AZ	2	120	119		
6	D'Lo Brown	July 14, 1998	Raw	Binghamton, NY	1	63	56	WWE recognizes Brown's reign as beginning on July 20, 1998, when the episode aired on tape delay.	
7	X-Pac	September 15, 1998	Raw	Sacramento, CA	1	14	13	WWE recognizes X-Pac's reign as beginning on September 21, 1998 and as ending on October 5, 1998, when the episodes aired on tape delay.	
8	D'Lo Brown	September 29, 1998	Raw	East Lansing, MI	2	19	12	WWE recognizes Brown's reign as beginning on October 5, 1998, when the episode aired on tape delay.	
9	X-Pac	October 18, 1998	Judgment Day: In Your House	Rosemont, IL	2	120	119		
10	Shane McMahon	February 15, 1999	Raw	Birmingham, AL	1	43	47	Defeated X-Pac in a tag team match with Shane McMahon and Kane vs. Triple H and X-Pac. WWE recognizes McMahon's reign as ending on April 4, 1999, when the following episode aired on tape delay.	
—	Deactivated	March 30, 1999	Sunday Night Heat	Uniondale, NY	—	—	—	Shane McMahon "retired as champion." Aired April 4, 1999, when the episode on tape delay.	
11	Mideon	June 21, 1999	Raw	Memphis, TN	1	34	33	Shane McMahon awarded Mideon the title after he found it in McMahon's travel bag.	
12	D'Lo Brown	July 25, 1999	Fully Loaded	Buffalo, NY	3	28	27		
13	Jeff Jarrett	August 22, 1999	SummerSlam	Minneapolis, MN	1	1	<1	This was also for D'Lo Brown's Intercontinental Championship.	
14	Mark Henry	August 23, 1999	Raw	Ames, IA	1	34	33	Jeff Jarrett gave the title to Henry as a gift for his assisting Jarrett in defeating D'Lo Brown at SummerSlam.	
15	D'Lo Brown	September 26, 1999	Unforgiven	Charlotte, NC	4	30	31	WWE recognizes Brown's reign as ending on October 28, 1999, when the following episode aired on tape delay.	
16	The British Bulldog	October 26, 1999	SmackDown!	Springfield, MA	2	47	44	WWE recognizes Bulldog's reign as beginning on October 28, 1999, when the episode aired on tape delay.	
17	Val Venis	December 12, 1999	Armageddon	Sunrise, FL	1	58	59	This was a triple threat match also involving D'Lo Brown. WWE recognizes Venis' reign as ending on February 10, 2000, when the following episode aired on tape delay.	
18	Kurt Angle	February 8, 2000	SmackDown!	Austin, TX	1	54	51	WWE recognizes Angle's reign as beginning on February 10, 2000, when the episode aired on tape delay.	
19	Chris Jericho	April 2, 2000	WrestleMania 2000	Anaheim, CA	1	1	<1	Won second fall of two-fall triple threat match also involving Chris Benoit (first fall was for Intercontinental Championship); Jericho pinned Benoit to win the European Championship.	
20	Eddie Guerrero	April 3, 2000	Raw	Los Angeles, CA	1	111	110		
21	Perry Saturn	July 23, 2000	Fully Loaded	Dallas, TX	1	37	38	WWE recognizes Saturn's reign as ending on August 31, 2000, when the episode aired on tape delay.	
22	Al Snow	August 29, 2000	SmackDown!	Fayetteville, NC	1	48	45	WWE recognizes Snow's reign as beginning on August 31, when the episode aired on tape delay.	
23	William Regal	October 16, 2000	Raw	Detroit, MI	1	47	46		
24	Crash Holly	December 2, 2000	Rebellion	Sheffield, England	1	2	1		
25	William Regal	December 4, 2000	Raw	East Rutherford, NJ	2	49	48		
26	Test	January 22, 2001	Raw	Lafayette, LA	1	69	68		
27	Eddie Guerrero	April 1, 2001	WrestleMania X-Seven	Houston, TX	2	23	24	WWE recognizes Guerrero's reign as ending on April 26, 2001, when the following episode aired on tape delay.	
28	Matt Hardy	April 24, 2001	SmackDown!	Denver, CO	1	125	122	WWE recognizes Hardy's reign as beginning on April 26, 2001, when the episode aired on tape delay.	
29	The Hurricane	August 27, 2001	Raw	Grand Rapids, MI	1	56	55		
30	Bradshaw	October 22, 2001	Raw	Kansas City, MO	1	8	9	WWE recognizes Bradshaw's reign as ending on November 1, 2001, when the following episode aired on tape delay.	
31	Christian	October 30, 2001	SmackDown!	Cincinnati, OH	1	91	90	WWE recognizes Christian's reign as beginning on November 1, 2001, when the episode aired on tape delay.	
32	Diamond Dallas Page	January 29, 2002	SmackDown!	Norfolk, VA	1	49	48	WWE recognizes Page's reign as beginning on January 31, 2002, when the episode aired on tape delay.	
World Wrestling Federation (WWF): Raw
33	William Regal	March 19, 2002	SmackDown!	Ottawa, ON, Canada	3	20	17	WWE recognizes Regal's reign as beginning on March 21, 2002, when the episode aired on tape delay. The championship became exclusive to Raw when Regal was drafted to the Raw brand on March 26, 2002.	
World Wrestling Entertainment (WWE): Raw
34	Spike Dudley	April 8, 2002	Raw	Phoenix, AZ	1	28	27	On May 5, 2002, after the World Wrestling Federation was renamed "World Wrestling Entertainment" due to a lawsuit by the World Wide Fund for Nature, the title was subsequently renamed to WWE European Championship.	
35	William Regal	May 6, 2002	Raw	Hartford, CT	4	63	62		
36	Jeff Hardy	July 8, 2002	Raw	Philadelphia, PA	1	14	13	WWE's official title history incorrectly lists Hardy's reign as ending on July 21.	
37	Rob Van Dam	July 22, 2002	Raw	Grand Rapids, MI	1	<1	—	This was a title unification ladder match in which Van Dam also defended the Intercontinental Championship. This reign is not listed on WWE's official title history, however his profile on WWE's website lists the European Championship as one of his accomplishments.	
—	Unified	July 22, 2002	Raw	Grand Rapids, MI	—	—	—	Rob Van Dam defeated Jeff Hardy to unify the WWE European Championship into the WWE Intercontinental Championship. The European Championship was retired with Hardy recognized as the final champion.	

== Combined reigns ==
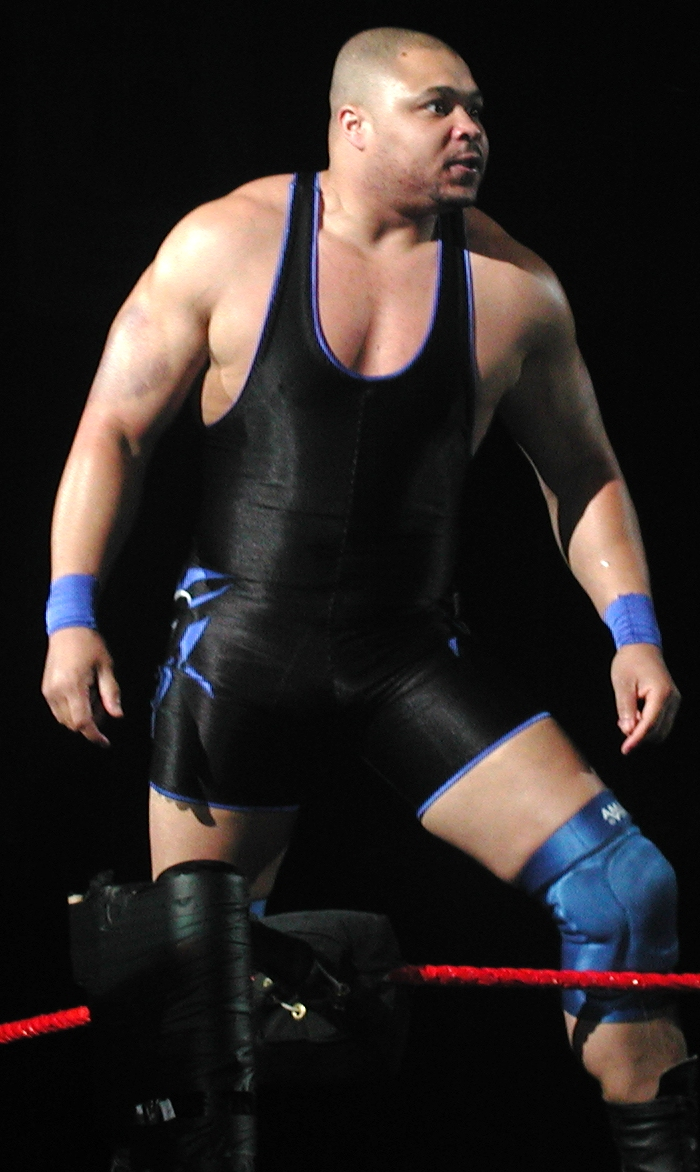
Record tying 4-time WWE European Champion D'Lo Brown

Rank	Champion	No. of reigns	Combined days	Combined days recognized by WWE
1	The British Bulldog	2	253	249
2	William Regal	4	179	173
3	Triple H	2	160	149
4	D'Lo Brown	4	140	126
5	Eddie Guerrero	2	134	134
5	X-Pac	2	134	132
7	Matt Hardy	1	125	122
8	Christian	1	91	90
9	Shawn Michaels	1	82	92
10	Test	1	69	68
11	Val Venis	1	58	59
12	The Hurricane	1	56	55
13	Owen Hart	1	55	52
14	Kurt Angle	1	54	51
15	Diamond Dallas Page	1	49	48
16	Al Snow	1	48	45
17	Shane McMahon	1	43	47
18	Perry Saturn	1	37	38
19	Mideon	1	34	33
19	Mark Henry	1	34	33
21	Spike Dudley	1	28	27
22	Jeff Hardy	1	14	12
23	Bradshaw	1	8	9
24	Crash Holly	1	2	1
25	Jeff Jarrett	1	1	<1
25	Chris Jericho	1	1	<1
27	Rob Van Dam	1	<1	—

== See also ==
- List of former championships in WWE
