= Val Venis =

Canadian professional wrestler (born 1971)

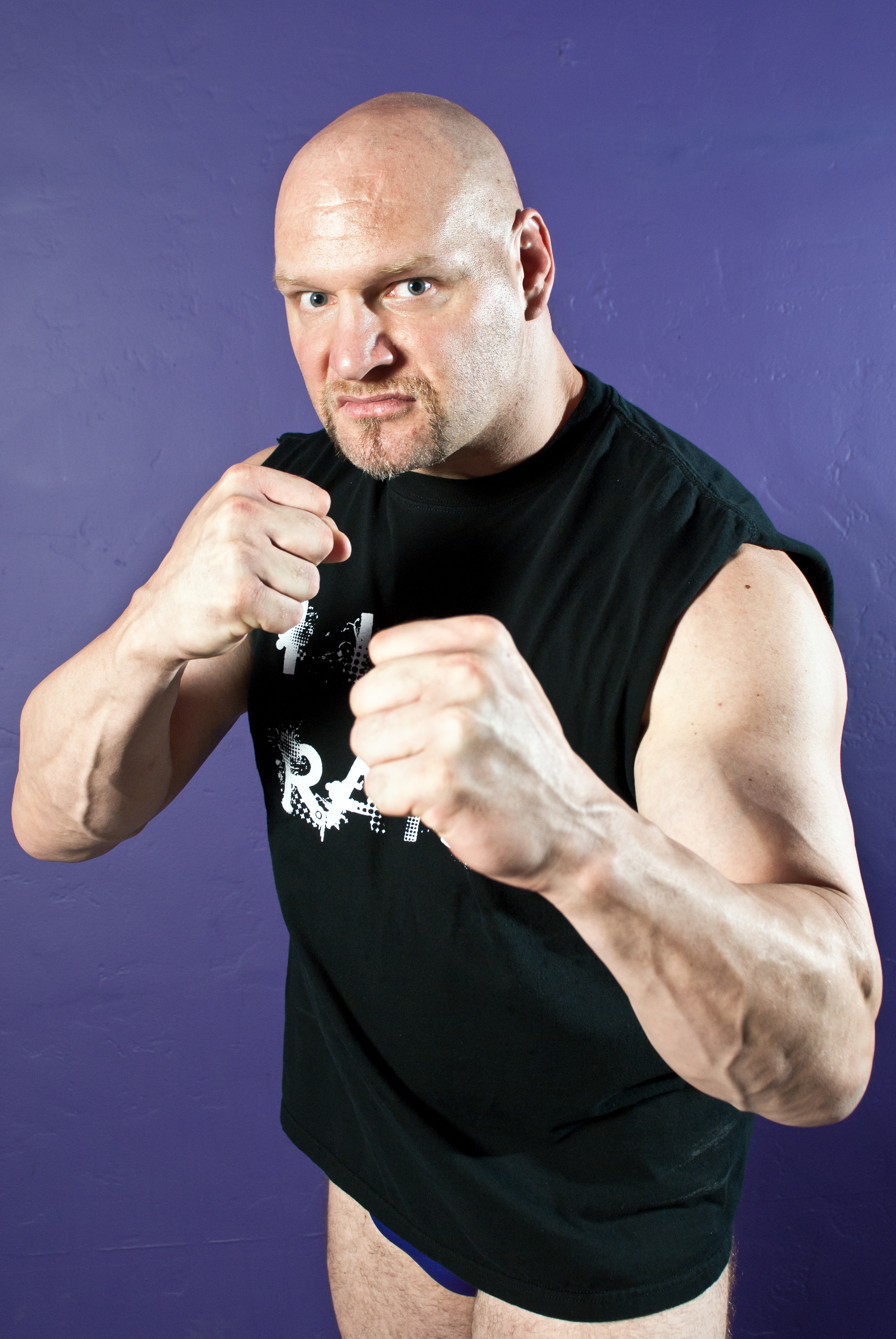
- Venis in 2010

Personal information
- Born: Sean Allen Morley; March 6, 1971 (age 55) Oakville, Ontario, Canada
- Children: 2

Professional wrestling career
- Ring names: Chief Morley; Glamour Boy Sean; Scott Borders; Sean Morgan; Sean Morley; El Steele; Val Venis; Too Hip; The Big Valbowski
- Billed height: 6 ft 3 in (191 cm)
- Billed weight: 244 lb (111 kg)
- Billed from: Las Vegas, Nevada
- Trained by: The Missing Link; Jason Robertson; Dory Funk Jr.; Tom Prichard
- Debut: 1994
- Retired: 2023

Sean Allen Morley (born March 6, 1971), better known by his ring name Val Venis, is a Canadian semi-retired professional wrestler. He is best known for his tenure in World Wrestling Federation/World Wrestling Entertainment (WWF/WWE) from 1998 to 2009. He is also known for his tenures in Consejo Mundial de Lucha Libre and Total Nonstop Action Wrestling (TNA).

During his career in WWF/WWE, Venis held the Intercontinental Championship twice, the European Championship once, and the World Tag Team Championship once with Lance Storm. As the masked Steele, he was the youngest person to win the CMLL World Heavyweight Championship.

== Professional wrestling career ==
=== Early career (1994–1998) ===
Morley began his wrestling training in the early 1990s under the tutelage of Jason and Dewey "The Missing Link" Robertson.He debuted on the Canadian independent circuit before making his way to the international circuit, finding work with All Japan Pro Wrestling (AJPW) in Japan, Consejo Mundial de Lucha Libre (CMLL), Promo Azteca, International Wrestling Revolution Group (IWRG) in Mexico, International Wrestling Association (IWA) and World Wrestling Council (WWC) in Puerto Rico where he was one half of a tag team known as the Canadian Glamour Boys with Shane Sewell; they were two-time WWC World Tag Team Champions. In Japan, he was known as Sean Morgan as the name Morley was difficult to pronounce due to the lack of phonetic differences between the L and R in Japanese. In Mexico, he adopted a robot-like mask and gimmick, changed his name to Steele, and won the CMLL World Heavyweight Championship.

=== World Wrestling Federation / World Wrestling Entertainment / WWE (1998–2009) ===
==== European Champion; Intercontinental Champion (1998–2000) ====
Morley was signed to the World Wrestling Federation (WWF) in 1998 and given the gimmick of an adult movie star named "Val Venis". The night after WrestleMania XIV, on the March 30 episode of Raw is War, vignettes started to air that showcased Venis' lifestyle on and off the set. The most notable of these aired on May 4 and featured Venis with prominent real-life porn star Jenna Jameson. During this time he worked in dark matches while building up for his debut.

He debuted on the May 18 episode of Raw is War, defeating Scorpio. Almost immediately, he was involved in an angle with the Kaientai stable, involving him having an affair with Yamaguchi-San's kayfabe wife, Shian-Li Tsang. As a result, the members of Kaientai had a series of unsuccessful matches against him. Venis made his pay-per-view debut at Fully Loaded: In Your House on July 26, defeating Jeff Jarrett. On the August 3 episode of Raw is War, his tag team partner Taka Michinoku would eventually betray him, which led to him and Kaientai tying Venis up backstage where Yamaguchi-San attempted to cut his penis off with a sword.

The next week, however, he reported that he was saved by "a little shrinkage" and help from his friend, John Wayne Bobbitt. He then challenged the four Japanese wrestlers to a match, which they accepted under the conditions that it must be a gauntlet match, meaning that Venis would have to fight all four of them individually in one match. The match ended with Michinoku executing the Michinoku Driver on Venis and getting the three-count, ending his undefeated streak. The feud ended a week later, after Venis fought Michinoku to a no contest.

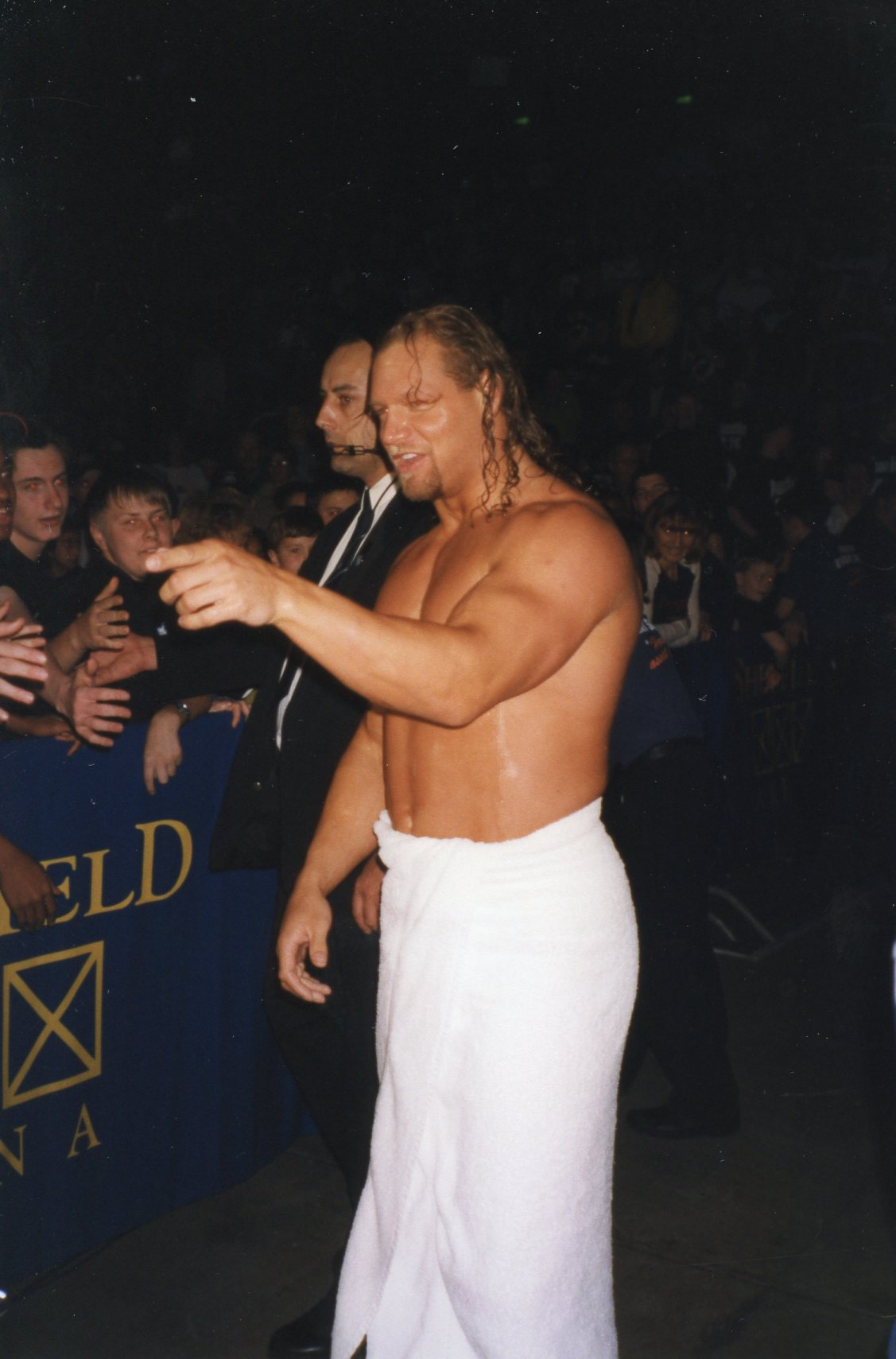
Venis in 1999.

After feuding with Kaientai, Venis got his first title shot in the WWF at SummerSlam on August 30 against WWF European Champion D'Lo Brown for his championship. Venis was disqualified and as a result, Brown retained the title. Venis got involved in a storyline where he slept with other people's wives. He started a feud with Dustin Runnels, on the September 14 episode of Raw is War when Venis showed Runnels his new porn movie, featuring Venis in bed with Dustin's wife, Terri Runnels. She then became his on-screen girlfriend. This culminated in a match at Breakdown: In Your House on September 27, which Venis won. On the October 12 episode of Raw is War, Venis participated in a tournament for the vacant WWF Intercontinental Championship, defeating Marc Mero in the first round before losing in the semifinals to Ken Shamrock. On the same night, Runnels returned to his Goldust gimmick. Venis continued his feud with Goldust, with Goldust gaining a victory at Judgment Day: In Your House on October 18. The two faced each other again at Capital Carnage on December 6, and Venis went on to win the match, to end the feud. When Terri said she was pregnant, Venis dumped her.

At the end of the year, he formed a short lived tag team with The Godfather, unofficially dubbed "Supply and Demand". They began teaming on the December 7 episode of Raw is War against The Acolytes. Their team only lasted a week, including a match against Mark Henry and D'Lo Brown at Rock Bottom: In Your House, and a match against the Brood. At the Royal Rumble on January 24, 1999, Venis competed in the Royal Rumble match where he was eliminated by Triple H, On the February 1 episode of Raw is War, he started a feud with Intercontinental Champion Ken Shamrock after Venis made a film starring him and Shamrock's kayfabe sister Ryan called Saving Ryan's Privates. At St. Valentine's Day Massacre: In Your House on February 14, Venis defeated Shamrock with the help of special guest referee Billy Gunn to win the Intercontinental Championship. The next night on Raw is War, Venis defended the title against Gunn and retained the title.

A few days later, he broke up with Ryan and eventually lost the Intercontinental Title to Road Dogg after only a one-month reign as champion. Venis began a feud with Road Dogg and made his WrestleMania debut at WrestleMania XV on March 28, where he challenged for the Intercontinental title in a Four Corners Elimination match which also included Ken Shamrock and Goldust. Venis failed to win the match. Throughout the rest of the year, he found himself having "woman troubles" with Nicole Bass, Chyna, and Debra. At Over the Edge on May 23, Venis and Nicole Bass defeated Jeff Jarrett and Debra, Venis reunited with the Godfather and they began challenging for the WWF Tag Team Championship. On the May 24 episode of Raw is War, Venis was defeated by The Rock in the main event. Venis then entered the 1999 King of the Ring tournament but was eliminated in the first round by Chyna. On the July 12 episode of Raw is War, Venis and The Godfather faced the Hardy Boyz for the titles, but the Hardy Boyz retained the titles by getting disqualified. Venis and the Godfather started a feud with Droz and Albert. The next week on Raw is War, Venis and Godfather, Droz and Albert, and the Acolytes challenged the Hardys to a fatal four-way elimination tag team match for the titles, where the Hardys went on to retain the titles.

He started a feud with Steve Blackman and defeated him at Unforgiven on September 26. His next feud was with Mark Henry, whom he beat at Rebellion on October 2. He engaged in feuds with several main eventers including The Rock, Mankind, and Steve Austin. At No Mercy on October 17, Venis faced Mankind in a winning effort. On the October 21 episode of SmackDown!, Venis faced Stone Cold Steve Austin in the main event where he lost. Venis later started a feud with European Champion The British Bulldog over the title. At Survivor Series on November 14, Venis teamed up with Mark Henry, Gangrel, and Steve Blackman to face the British Bulldog and the Mean Street Posse with his team winning the match.

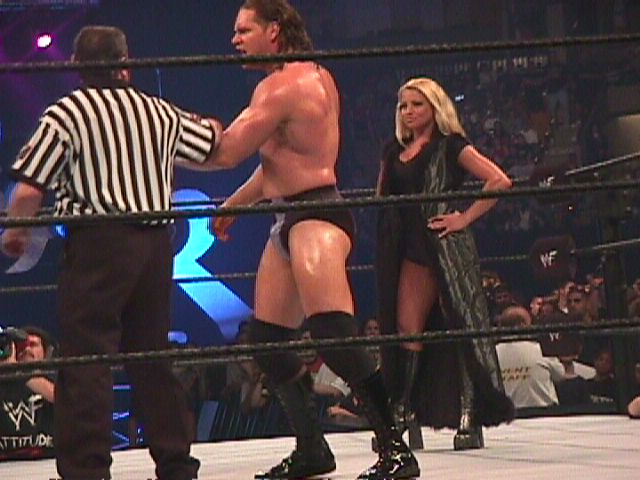
Venis at King of the Ring with Trish Stratus in 2000.

At Armageddon on December 12, Venis pinned the British Bulldog in a triple threat match with D-Lo Brown to win the WWF European Championship. On the January 10, 2000 episode of Raw is War, Venis defeated Edge to retain the title. At the Royal Rumble on January 23, Venis competed in the Royal Rumble match where he was eliminated by Kane. On the February 10 episode of SmackDown!, he dropped the European Title to Kurt Angle, ending his two-month reign. Around this time, Morley largely disappeared from WWF television programming until mid-May, due to a legitimate neck injury which limited his mobility.

At King of the Ring on June 25, Venis participated in the King of the Ring tournament where he defeated Eddie Guerrero in the Quarter-Finals but was defeated by Rikishi in the semi-finals. This culminated in a feud between Venis and Rikishi which led to Venis turning heel by aligning himself with Trish Stratus. On the July 6 episode of SmackDown!, Venis defeated Rikishi to win his second Intercontinental Championship, and aligned himself with Test and Albert. Venis and Rikishi continued their rivalry as Venis defended the title in a steel cage rematch at Fully Loaded on July 23. The match was notable for seeing Venis take a splash from Rikishi from the top of a 15-foot high steel cage and still going on to defeat Rikishi to retain the title. Soon after, Venis began sporting a new look that included a haircut, white boots and trunks - and the near total disposal of the porn star gimmick. At SummerSlam on August 27, Stratus inadvertently lost Venis' Intercontinental title to Chyna in a mixed tag team match involving the pair against the team of Chyna and Eddie Guerrero.

==== Right to Censor (2000–2001) ====
Shortly after, Venis underwent a complete change in persona and became a member of the Right to Censor (RTC) stable. Venis joined RTC after being abducted by Bull Buchanan and The Goodfather. He became a censorship-based character, directly contrasting with his previously provocative on-screen character. Of this change, Morley said in an interview that "the porn star gimmick and storylines kind of overshadowed my work," and that he wanted a more serious persona to better highlight his in-ring abilities and move towards being one of the WWF's top heels. Morley has gone on record saying, the RTC character was his least favorite character, since he lost the core of his previous character and it was hard to wrestle wearing a tie and t-shirt. RTC feuded with the Acolytes and the Dudley Boyz, culminating in an eight-man tag team match at Unforgiven on September 24, which RTC won. On the October 12 episode of SmackDown!, Venis got a shot at the WWF Championship against The Rock but failed to win the title. At No Mercy on October 22, Venis teamed up with Steven Richards to face Chyna and Mr. Ass. After interference from Eddie Guerrero, RTC picked up the win. On the November 6 episode of Raw is War, Venis lost to The Undertaker. On the November 23 episode of SmackDown!, Venis defeated K-Kwik. Venis started a feud with Chyna, culminating in a match at Armageddon on December 10 which Venis won. At the Royal Rumble on January 21, 2001, Venis competed in the Royal Rumble match where he was eliminated by The Undertaker.

At WrestleMania X-Seven on April 1, RTC faced Tazz and the APA in a six-man tag match which RTC lost. The next night on Raw is War, he faced Kane for the Hardcore Championship but lost the match. On the April 26 episode of SmackDown!, RTC faced The Undertaker in a 4 on 1 handicap match where the other members of the group walked out on Steven Richards. Venis stayed in RTC until they disbanded right before the Invasion storyline, feuding with Chyna and "The One" Billy Gunn during his tenure with the group. When RTC broke up in June and the Invasion began in July, Venis disappeared from WWF television while recovering from surgery on his hip to remove bone spurs from his motorcycle racing days. After recovering, he was kept off television along with several other wrestlers, for whom WWF bookers could not come up with any storylines. Instead, he worked in WWF's developmental territory Heartland Wrestling Association in late 2001.

==== The Big Valbowski (2002) ====
Venis returned to action back in his old gimmick, at the 2002 Royal Rumble, where he entered at #20 in the Royal Rumble match but was shortly after eliminated by Steve Austin. On Raw he had two very short feuds with Stone Cold Steve Austin and Mr. Perfect before being drafted to SmackDown! during the brand extension.

On SmackDown!, he began calling himself "The Big Valbowski" in reference to the 1998 film The Big Lebowski, and aligned himself with babyfaces Edge, Randy Orton, Billy Kidman, and Hardcore Holly and feuded with Chris Jericho, Deacon Batista, and Reverend D-Von.

In June, Venis competed in the 2002 King of the Ring tournament. He defeated Christian in the first round, then lost to Chris Jericho in the quarterfinals.

Morley was sidelined with a legitimate neck injury and laceration in late July, after gym equipment fell on him in Canada. He returned to wrestling SmackDown! dark matches in September, and made his last televised appearance as Val Venis on October 26 at Rebellion, where he teamed with Chuck Palumbo in a loss to Reverend D-Von and Ron Simmons.

==== Chief of Staff; World Tag Team Champion (2002–2003) ====
He returned to television on the November 18 episode on Raw under his real name, Sean Morley. He was appointed Raw "Chief of Staff" by Raw General Manager, Eric Bischoff, turning heel once again by acting as Bischoff's assistant and going by Chief Morley. Morley began a feud with the Dudley Boyz in March 2003. On the March 24 episode of Raw, he officially became one half of the World Tag Team Champions with Lance Storm after Storm's partner, William Regal, was sidelined with an illness. Storm and Morley successfully defended the World Tag Team Championship on the episode of Heat prior to WrestleMania XIX on March 30 at Safeco Field against Rob Van Dam and Kane with help from the Dudley Boyz, only to lose them to Kane and Van Dam the next night.

==== Late WWE career (2003–2009) ====
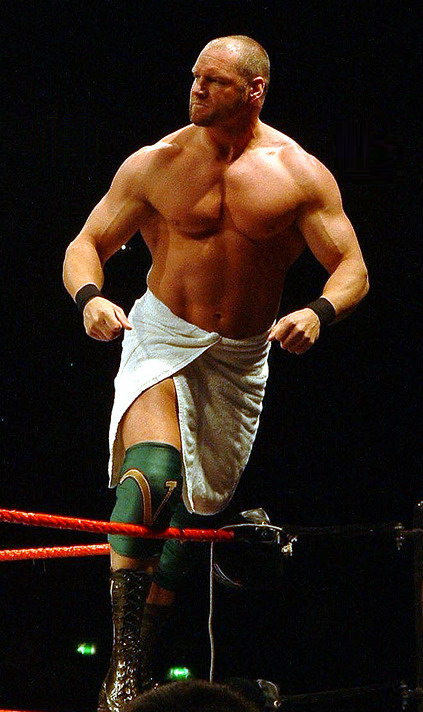
Morley (as Val Venis) in 2006.

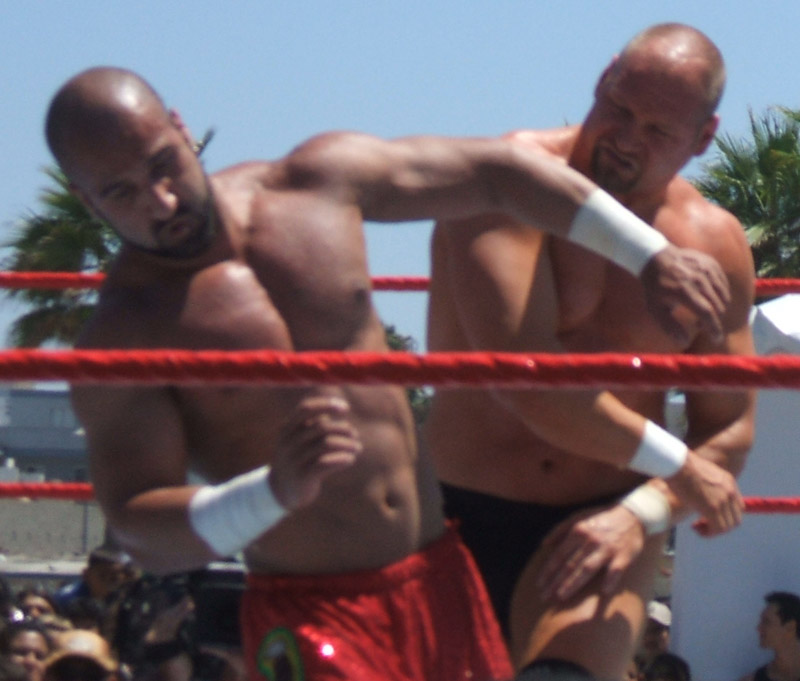
Venis (right) wrestling against Daivari in 2007.

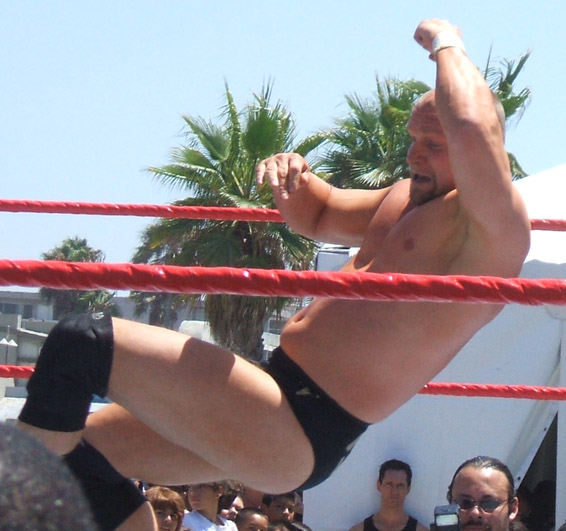
Venis executing an elbow drop in 2007.

Morley was "fired" from his assistant job by Bischoff after he lost a match to Jerry "The King" Lawler in which Jim Ross' job was on the line. He was quickly "rehired" by co-General Manager, Stone Cold Steve Austin. After returning as Val Venis, he participated in a battle royal at Judgment Day for the vacant Intercontinental Championship, won by Christian. Throughout mid-2003, 2004, and the first half of 2005, Venis became a face again, but did not get much in the way of a push. Venis began wrestling as a mid-carder on Heat and on the September 14, 2003 episode of Heat, he faced Christian in another match for the Intercontinental Championship, which Christian won.

He reformed his previous tag team with Lance Storm as faces, but the partnership faded and Venis became utilized mainly as a "jobber to the stars". At Armageddon, Venis and Storm competed in a Tag Team Turmoil match for the World Tag Team Championship which was won by Batista and Ric Flair. In 2005, he started shaving his head bald. He defeated Ring of Honor wrestler and future WWE Champion CM Punk in Punk's first WWE tryout match on May 9, 2005, which led to CM Punk getting a contract and being sent to developmental. On the January 2 episode of Heat, Venis lost to Ric Flair in the main event of the night.

At WrestleMania 21, Venis competed in a 30-man Interpromotional battle royal which was won by Booker T. In the summer of 2005 he formed another team, V-Squared, with Viscera. While wrestling on Heat, they squashed a number of other tag teams including the World Tag Team Champions Lance Cade and Trevor Murdoch in a non-title match. On the December 5 episode of Raw, V-Squared participated in a fatal four-way match for the World Tag Team Championship, including the champions Big Show and Kane, The Heart Throbs, and Snitsky and Tyson Tomko but were defeated. Venis and Viscera continued to team in 2006, getting another shot at Big Show and Kane's titles, while occasionally having solo matches. In March 2006, Venis suffered a kayfabe injury at the hands of the Spirit Squad which allowed him to take time off for legitimate elbow surgery, during which about a dozen more bone spurs were removed, six others were shaved down, and a nerve was transplanted.

While he was out, Viscera began teaming with Charlie Haas, leaving Venis to team with Snitsky upon his return in a team that didn't last long. Venis began a feud with Eugene on Heat when Eugene interrupted and attacked him during a "Kiss Cam" segment on December 4. On the following episode of Heat, Venis and Eugene had a match which Eugene won. On the December 18 episode of Raw, Val participated in a #1 contender's battle royal, won by Edge. In February 2007, WWE.com launched a new broadband network giving fans an opportunity to access free videos, and Venis was given his own show called Sex-U. The show would see Venis and a special guest offering love tips to the viewing audience. Sex-U was the most popular show in the first three months of the new broadband network and its four episodes were streamed more than 800,000 times. No new episodes were made after this and the show was removed from WWE.com without reason shortly afterwards. On the March 19, 2007 episode of Raw, he participated in a Money in the Bank qualifying battle royal, won by Edge.

In late 2007, he began a feud with Santino Marella. During the feud, Marella gave Venis a sneak attack, causing him an injury. The two had a match on the October 15 episode of Raw, which Marella won. On the February 18, 2008 episode of Raw, he lost to Mr. Kennedy in a Money in the Bank qualifying match. On the March 25 episode of ECW on Sci Fi, he participated in a twelve-on-twelve tag team match involving all the participants of the battle royal. At WrestleMania XXIV, he participated in a pre-show number one contender's battle royal, with the winner facing ECW Champion Chavo Guerrero later that night. Kane went on to win the battle royal. On the April 7 episode of Raw, Venis fell to Umaga. On the April 14 tapings for Heat, he lost his last WWE match to Snitsky. Morley spent the rest of 2008 out of action due to an injury, during which WWE transitioned to the more family-friendly PG Era and his traditional porn star gimmick would no longer be appropriate for the company's target demographics of children. On January 9, 2009, he was released from his WWE contract after over a decade of working for the company.

=== Independent circuit (2009) ===
After his release from WWE, Morley toured in Japan with New Japan Pro-Wrestling (NJPW), losing to Hiroshi Tanahashi on March 22, 2009, and with Hulk Hogan's Hulkamania: Let the Battle Begin tour of the world which started in Melbourne, Australia.

=== Total Nonstop Action Wrestling (2010) ===
Morley made his debut for Total Nonstop Action Wrestling (TNA) on the January 4, 2010, episode of Impact! in a backstage segment with The Beautiful People. On the January 14 episode of Impact!, Morley had another segment, complete with revamped theme music, where he explained he was no longer an adult film star, but rather an adult film producer. This led to Daniels coming to the ring and attacking him, setting up a match at the Genesis pay-per-view on January 17. At Genesis, Morley defeated Daniels in his first match for the company with his patented Money Shot. On the January 28 episode of Impact!, Morley suffered his first loss in TNA, losing to Desmond Wolfe in an 8 Card Stud Tournament qualifying match. On the March 4 episode of Impact!, Morley pinned Jeff Jarrett in an impromptu Falls Count Anywhere match by order of Eric Bischoff, turning heel for the first time in TNA. However, the next day Morley announced on Facebook that largely due to the move of Impact! to Monday nights, his original plan to wrestle for both TNA and CMLL had to change and therefore he was done with TNA.

=== Return to the independent circuit (2010–2023, 2026) ===
Morley worked with Elite Xtreme Wrestling now known as Future Stars of Wrestling as Val Venis where he was a former EXW Tag Team Champion with Dexter Verity. On April 16, 2011, Venis defeated Rhett Titus in Franklin, Pennsylvania for a special IWC Nights of Legends event. Three events later Venis challenged John McChesney for the IWC World Heavyweight Championship but was unsuccessful.

In late 2011, Morley returned to Canada wrestling for Championship Wrestling International, Venis defeated former World Tag Team Champion Sylvain Grenier in Lindsay, Ontario, Canada. The following day Venis defeated Chris Masters at CWI Fall Brawl 2 in Caledonia, Ontario, Canada.

On June 1, 2012, Morley lost to former WWE wrestler and tag partner Big Daddy V in New York City for ECPW Five Boros.

In 2013, Morley returned to Canada working in Manitoba's Canadian Wrestling's Elite and 2014 in British Columbia's Elite Canadian Championship Wrestling and Invasion Championship Wrestling where he reunited with his former WWE tag partner The Godfather.

Morley toured in England for House of Pain: Evolution where he defeated Marty Scurll in Derby, England on June 19, 2015.

On April 5, 2019, Morley teamed with Joey Ryan and SeXXXy Eddy losing to Scarlett Bordeaux, Priscilla Kelly and Martina in a six tag intergender match at Wrestlecon Joey Ryan's Penis Party in New York City.

On May 6, 2023, Venis was defeated by Danny Morrison in a singles match for Independent Superstars of Professional Wrestling (ISPW)'s Rock N’ Wrestling show.

On July 23, 2026, Venis stepped back into the ring to face Rico Gold in a losing bout for ISPW's Legends of Wrestling Night. Venis later stated that while it was a one-off match, he wasn't treating his retirement as permanent.

== Personal life ==
Morley speaks social Spanish, which he learned during the time he spent in Mexican lucha libre promotions. His sister, Alannah Morley, was married to Adam "Edge" Copeland between 2001 and 2004, after she had been in a relationship with Copeland since 1998.

Morley is an advocate for the legalisation of cannabis, and as of 2015 he worked as a budtender at "Health for Life" marijuana dispensary in Mesa, Arizona.

=== Controversy ===
In February 2020, Morley came under fire from many wrestlers and wrestling fans after making several comments criticizing All Elite Wrestling (AEW)'s decision to put their women's championship on a transgender wrestler, Nyla Rose. Morley commented on his Twitter and Facebook profiles, arguing that Rose was a biological male and saying only a "real woman" should be holding a women's championship. Several professional wrestlers in many promotions immediately came to Rose's defense, most notably Cody and Dustin Rhodes, and criticized Morley's views. In February 2024, Morley received similar backlash for an edited image of a selfie involving Cody Rhodes and a transgender flag that a trans fan brought to a WWE live event, saying that the trans fan "needs the power of Jesus to affirm their salvation instead of affirming a mental disorder."

Morley has been known to express libertarian political beliefs and to be a believer in QAnon conspiracy theories. On his YouTube channel, "Top Shelf Anarchy," he advocates for anarchy and claims that "the government" is a "criminal organization." His channel features several videos of Morley attempting to film in facilities that prohibit video recording, and the resulting confrontations with security and law enforcement officers, a practice described by practitioners as "First Amendment audits". Morley has on multiple occasions posted COVID-19 vaccine misinformation on his social media pages, most notably following the death of wrestler Bray Wyatt after a heart attack exacerbated by COVID-19. In January 2021, Morley was temporarily banned from Twitter for violating their child sexual exploitation policy after posting a photo which he claimed showed Hunter Biden having sex with Malia Obama.

== Championships and accomplishments ==
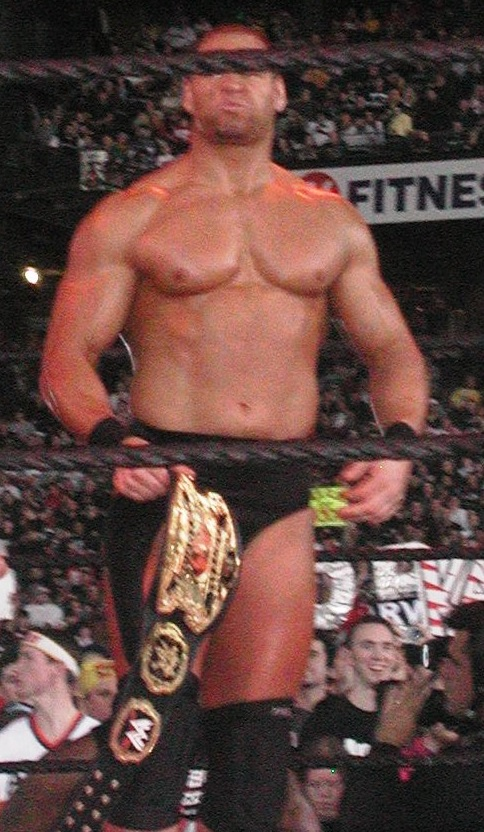
Val Venis (as "Chief Morley") as World Tag Team Champion in 2003.

- Consejo Mundial de Lucha Libre
  - CMLL World Heavyweight Championship (1 time)
  - International Gran Prix (1997)
- Elite Xtreme Wrestling
  - EXW Tag Team Championship (1 time) – with Dexter Verity
- Heartland Wrestling Association
  - HWA Tag Team Championship (1 time) – with Steve Bradley
- International Wrestling Association
  - IWA World Tag Team Championship (1 time) – with Ricky Santana
- Pro Wrestling Illustrated
  - Ranked #25 in the top 500 singles wrestlers in the PWI 500 in 1999
  - Ranked #331 of the 500 best singles wrestlers of the PWI Years in 2003
- World Wrestling Council
  - WWC Television Championship (4 times)
  - WWC World Tag Team Championship (3 times) – with Glamour Boy Shane (2) and Rex King (1)
- World Wrestling Federation / World Wrestling Entertainment
  - World Tag Team Championship (1 time) – with Lance Storm
  - WWF European Championship (1 time)
  - WWF Intercontinental Championship (2 times)

== Luchas de Apuestas record ==
Winner (wager)	Loser (wager)	Location	Event	Date	Notes
Rayo de Jalisco Jr. (mask)	Steel (mask)	Mexico City	Live event	June 8, 1998	
