= Unforgiven (1999) =

World Wrestling Federation pay-per-view event

- Promotional poster featuring The Undertaker
- Promotion: World Wrestling Federation
- Date: September 26, 1999
- City: Charlotte, North Carolina
- Venue: Charlotte Coliseum
- Attendance: 15,779
- Buy rate: 300,000
- Tagline: Their Soul Will Remain Unforgiven

Pay-per-view chronology
← Previous; SummerSlam	Next → Rebellion

Unforgiven chronology
← Previous; In Your House	Next → 2000

The 1999 Unforgiven was a professional wrestling pay-per-view (PPV) event produced by the World Wrestling Federation (WWF, renamed WWE in 2002). It was the second annual Unforgiven and took place on September 26, 1999, at the Charlotte Coliseum in Charlotte, North Carolina. The first Unforgiven in April 1998 was an In Your House event, but following the discontinuation of the In Your House series after February 1999, a second Unforgiven event was scheduled as its own PPV event, but in September, thus being the third former In Your House event to do so, after Over the Edge and Fully Loaded, and becoming the annual September PPV. Unforgiven was presented by Wizards of The Coast which was promoting the collectible card game Magic: The Gathering.

The main event was a Six-Pack Challenge–a non-elimination match consisting of six wrestlers for the vacant WWF Championship. "Stone Cold" Steve Austin served as the special outside enforcer for the match. The match included Triple H, The Rock, Mankind, Kane, Big Show, and British Bulldog. Triple H pinned The Rock after a Pedigree to win the WWF Championship. The undercard featured X-Pac versus Chris Jericho, a Kennel from Hell match between champion Al Snow, and challenger Big Boss Man for the WWF Hardcore Championship, The New Age Outlaws (Billy Gunn and Road Dogg) versus Edge and Christian for the WWF Tag Team Championship, Ivory versus Luna Vachon in a Hardcore match for the WWF Women's Championship, The Acolytes (Faarooq and Bradshaw) versus The Dudley Boyz (Bubba Ray Dudley and D-Von Dudley), Jeff Jarrett versus Chyna in an intergender match for the WWF Intercontinental Championship, Mark Henry versus D'Lo Brown for the WWF European Championship, and Val Venis versus Steve Blackman.

The matches of the event featured special guest referees, due to the WWF officials being out on "strike" due to continuous assaults on them by wrestlers. However, only one WWF official, Jim Korderas, served as the referee of the event. He refereed Dudley Boyz vs. The Acolytes, the WWF Tag Team Championship match, and the WWF Championship match. The Kennel From Hell match is widely regarded as one of the worst matches ever. It is jokingly included on Mick Foley's Hard Knocks And Cheap Pops as a shot at Al Snow, who Foley had repeatedly ribbed over the years.

== Production ==
=== Background ===
From May 1995 to February 1999, the professional wrestling company World Wrestling Federation (WWF, renamed WWE in 2002) ran a series of pay-per-view (PPV) events titled In Your House. They aired when the promotion was not holding one of its then-five major PPVs (WrestleMania, King of the Ring, SummerSlam, Survivor Series, and Royal Rumble) and were sold at a lower cost. Following St. Valentine's Day Massacre: In Your House in February 1999, the In Your House branding was retired to give each monthly PPV a permanent identity.

Prior to the discontinuation of the In Your House series, the WWF held Unforgiven: In Your House in April 1998, which was the 21st In Your House event. A second Unforgiven was scheduled for the following year, but pushed back to September on September 26, 1999, at the Charlotte Coliseum in Charlotte, North Carolina. It was promoted as a standalone event, thus establishing Unforgiven as the annual September PPV. This was the third former In Your House event to continue as its own distinct PPV series, after Over the Edge and Fully Loaded.

=== Storylines ===
Unforgiven featured professional wrestling matches that involved different wrestlers from pre-existing feuds, plots, and storylines that were played out on Raw is War, and SmackDown!—the WWF's television programs.

The main rivalry heading into the event was between Triple H, The Rock, Mankind, Kane, Big Show, and The Undertaker over the vacant WWF Championship. At SummerSlam, Mankind defeated "Stone Cold" Steve Austin, and Triple H in a Triple Threat match for Austin's WWF title, only to lose it to Triple H the following night on Raw is War. On the September 13 edition of Raw is War, the WWF CEO Linda McMahon announced that The Rock, Kane, Mankind, Big Show, and The Undertaker would compete in a 5-Way match to determine the #1 contender for the title at Unforgiven. However, the match resulted in a no-contest after Mideon, and Viscera attacked Mankind. As a result, all five of the wrestlers attacked several WWF referees, and many of the WWF wrestlers interfered in the brawl. As a result of the attack, the referees went on an on-screen strike, and all the five competitors were named contenders for the title, making it a Six Pack Challenge for the title at Unforgiven, meaning that two wrestlers would begin the match, and a wrestler could become legal if he was tagged in. On the September 16 edition of SmackDown!, the WWF Chairman Vince McMahon defeated Triple H for the WWF title, with the help of his son Shane, who served as the special guest referee for the match. However, Vince vacated the title on the September 20 episode of Raw is War, and named Triple H as the sixth competitor in the Six Pack Challenge at Unforgiven. On the September 23, 1999 edition of SmackDown!, however, McMahon decided to place Triple H in a gauntlet series of matches against the other five competitors in the match. He would have to wrestle Big Show in a Chokeslam Challenge match, Kane in an inferno Match, The Undertaker in a casket match, Mankind in a Boiler Room Brawl, and The Rock in a Brahma Bull Rope match, and if he failed to win three of the five matches, he would be out of the match. Triple H lost the first match due to his inability to lift the massive Big Show. He managed to beat Kane when Kane was distracted by Mideon, and Viscera, The Undertaker's allies, long enough to accidentally set himself on fire, but lost the casket match after The Undertaker, who orchestrated the distraction on Kane, walked out, and was fired after refusing to wrestle; the match became a handicap match, and Triple H could not put both Mideon, and Viscera in a casket before they did it to him. He managed to escape the boiler room to even up the gauntlet and bring it to the deciding match with The Rock. The British Bulldog, who was named as a replacement for The Undertaker in the Six-Pack Challenge (in kayfabe, The Undertaker walked out of the WWF, but in reality, he needed time off to deal with a severe groin injury and would be gone for nine months while he recovered), served as the guest referee and assisted Triple H's victory by turning on The Rock, giving Triple H the necessary three wins he needed to keep his spot in the main event.

Another predominant rivalry heading into the event was between Al Snow and The Big Boss Man over the WWF Hardcore Championship. At SummerSlam, Snow defeated Boss Man to win the Hardcore Championship. The following night on Raw is War, Snow was attacked by Boss Man during a title defense against Road Dogg, who had left the match to brawl with Chris Jericho. Boss Man stole Snow's dog Pepper and escaped with it. On the August 26 episode of SmackDown!, Boss Man defeated Snow to win the title and escaped with Pepper. The following week, Snow ate some food until Boss Man told him that it was Pepper. On September 9, British Bulldog defeated Boss Man for the title and awarded it to Snow. On Raw is War on September 13, Snow challenged Boss Man to a Kennel from Hell match for the Hardcore Championship at Unforgiven, which Boss Man accepted.

At SummerSlam, Mark Henry turned on his partner D'Lo Brown by costing him the WWF Intercontinental Championship and the WWF European Championship against Jeff Jarrett. The next night on Raw is War, Jarrett awarded the European Championship to Henry. Henry and Brown wrestled each other in several tag team matches and attacked each other on many occasions, leading to a European Championship match at Unforgiven.

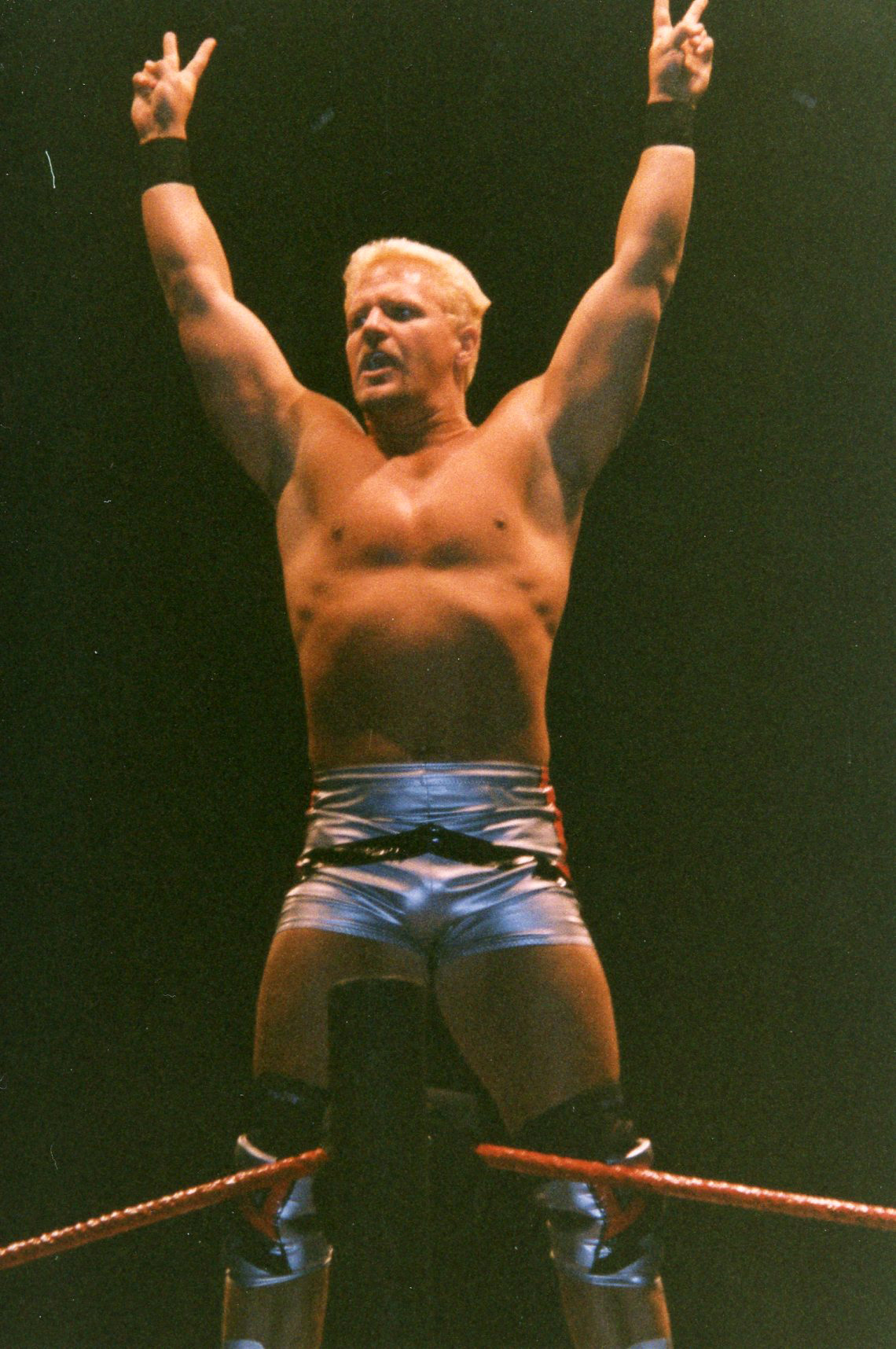
Jeff Jarrett defended the WWF Intercontinental Championship in an intergender match against Chyna at Unforgiven.

Following his WWF Intercontinental Championship victory at SummerSlam, Jeff Jarrett offered an open contract to any WWF wrestler for an Intercontinental Championship match at Unforgiven. Chyna signed the contract but Billy Gunn offered Chyna to hand him over the contract for the number one contender for the Intercontinental Championship at Unforgiven. On the September 2 episode of SmackDown!, Chyna defeated Billy Gunn to retain her status as the number one contender for the Intercontinental Championship.

On the September 2 episode of SmackDown!, a Tag Team Turmoil match was held to determine the number one contenders for the WWF Tag Team Championship. The Acolytes (Faarooq and Bradshaw) and Edge and Christian were the remaining two teams in the match and were attacked by the debuting The Dudley Boyz (Bubba Ray Dudley and D-Von Dudley). As a result, the match ended in a no contest. On September 6, on Raw is War, Edge and Christian defeated The Acolytes to become the number one contenders for the Tag Team Championship, after further interference by Dudley Boyz. As a result, a match was made between Dudley Boyz and Acolytes at Unforgiven. The Tag Team Championship changed hands many times after Edge and Christian were made the contenders. On the September 23 episode of SmackDown!, the final title change before Unforgiven occurred when the New Age Outlaws (Mr. Ass and Road Dogg) defeated Rock 'n' Sock Connection (The Rock and Mankind) for the Tag Team Championship.

On the August 26 episode of SmackDown!, Luna Vachon involved herself in the WWF Women's Champion Ivory's Evening Gown match against Tori. Luna later got involved in a brawl between Ivory and Tori on Raw is War on September 6. A week later on Raw is War, Luna was attacked by Ivory during her match with Jeff Jarrett. This led to a match between Ivory and Luna for the Women's Championship at Unforgiven. On the September 23 episode of SmackDown!, Luna offered to make their bout a Hardcore match which Ivory accepted.

At SummerSlam, Ken Shamrock defeated Steve Blackman in a Lion's Den match. On the September 2 episode of SmackDown!, Blackman tried to attack Shamrock after Shamrock's match with Val Venis but Shamrock attacked Blackman. When Blackman recovered, he vented his anger on Venis by attacking him. Blackman attacked Venis again after Venis' match against Big Show on Raw is War on September 6. Venis took his revenge by costing Blackman, a WWF European Championship match against Mark Henry and a standard match against Shawn Stasiak, leading to a match between Venis and Blackman at Unforgiven.

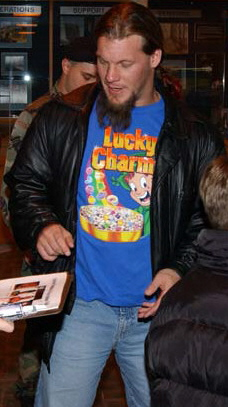
Chris Jericho faced X-Pac in his first pay-per-view match for the World Wrestling Federation.

At SummerSlam, Road Dogg announced that he would challenge the winner of the WWF Hardcore Championship match between Al Snow and Big Boss Man on the following night on Raw is War. However, Road Dogg was interrupted by Chris Jericho and as a result, Jericho and Road Dogg began feuding with each other. During Road Dogg's scheduled Hardcore Championship match against Al Snow on Raw is War, Jericho began brawling with Road Dogg. As a result, the match resulted in a no-contest. On the August 26 episode of SmackDown!, Jericho powerbombed Road Dogg through a table during a match between the two. Jericho continued to assault Road Dogg after the match by applying the Walls of Jericho. On the September 2 episode of SmackDown!, Road Dogg's D-Generation X (DX) teammate X-Pac wrestled Jericho as he attempted to avenge Jericho's assault on Road Dogg but the match resulted in a no contest after interference by the Unholy Alliance (The Undertaker and Big Show). Jericho was also feuding with Ken Shamrock at the time due to attacking him with a chair before Shamrock's scheduled match with Val Venis. It would lead to a match between the two at Unforgiven. However, on the September 23 episode of SmackDown!, Shamrock was badly injured after losing a First Blood match to Jericho and left WWF. As a result, X-Pac replaced Shamrock as Jericho's opponent at Unforgiven.

== Event ==
Other on-screen personnel
Role:	Name:
English Commentators	Jim Ross
English Commentators	Jerry Lawler
English Commentators	"Stone Cold" Steve Austin (6 Pack Challenge)
Spanish Commentators	Carlos Cabrera
Spanish Commentators	Hugo Savinovich
Interviewers	Michael Cole
Interviewers	Lilian Garcia
Ring Announcer	Howard Finkel
Referees	Tom Prichard
Referees	Jim Korderas
Referees	Steve Lombardi
Referees	Harvey Wippleman

=== Preliminary matches ===
As the event began, the first match took place between Val Venis, and Steve Blackman. The Brooklyn Brawler refereed the match. Venis stole Blackman's bag of weapons, and brought it to the ring. Blackman looked to regain his weapons, so he attacked Venis in the corner. Blackman dominated most of the match and attacked Venis outside the ring. Blackman rammed Venis' back with the ring post and returned to the ring. Blackman whipped Venis on numerous occasions. Venis recovered and clotheslined Blackman. After a series of Knee Lifts, Venis hit Blackman with a Russian Legsweep. Blackman punched Venis and tried to whip Venis but was whipped instead. Blackman hit a Running Crossbody on Venis for a near-fall. Venis ran through the ropes but received a Spinebuster from Blackman. Blackman tried to whip Venis into the corner, but Venis reversed it and hit a Corner Clothesline. Venis hit Blackman with a Money Shot for the victory. After the match, Venis tried to hit Blackman with Blackman's own kendo stick but Blackman reversed and knocked out Venis by hitting him with the kendo stick.

The second match was between Mark Henry and D'Lo Brown for the WWF European Championship. Tom Prichard refereed the match. Henry refused to defend the title as he was slapped by Lilian Garcia in a pre-match interview segment. However, Brown attacked Henry in the aisle. Henry attacked Brown with the ringpost and then both men entered the ring to start the match. Brown ducked a clothesline and hit Henry with a series of punches. Henry tried to whip Brown, but Brown reversed, whipped Henry, and hit him with a Sky High. Brown followed by hitting a diving axe handle elbow drop for a near-fall. Henry began attacking Brown until Brown hit a crossbody to get a near-fall. Brown tried to whip Henry, but Henry held on and hit a military press slam. Henry followed with a Scoop Powerslam, a Clothesline, and a Chinlock. The action spilled to the outside until they returned to the ring and Henry clotheslined Brown. Brown hit a crossbody, but Henry kicked out. Brown tried to hit another crossbody, but Henry caught him and dropped him with a powerslam. Brown connected with a spinning wheel kick followed by a legdrop. Brown clotheslined Henry into the corner. Henry tried to hit Brown with mounted punches, but Brown hit a sitout powerbomb, followed by a Lo Down, to win the European Championship.

The third match featured Jeff Jarrett defending the WWF Intercontinental Championship against Chyna. Harvey Wippleman refereed the match. As Chyna entered the ring, Jarrett began attacking her. Chyna countered by clotheslining Jarrett. Jarrett climbed the top rope but Chyna low blowed Jarrett and threw him outside of the ring. Jarrett applied a Sleeper Hold on Chyna and tried to hit a hurricanrana but was powerbombed by Chyna. Chyna tried to hit a hurricanrana of her own, but Jarrett powerbombed her. The action spilled to the outside of the ring, where Chyna hit Jarrett with a chair. However, Wippleman did not disqualify her, and the match continued. Chyna hit Jarrett with the chair again before attempting a Pedigree. However, Jarrett reversed the move and Chyna accidentally knocked out Wippleman. Jarrett took advantage and tried to hit Chyna with his guitar. However, Fabulous Moolah and Mae Young, who were standing at ringside, prevented Jarrett from hitting Chyna. As a result, Jarrett attacked both of them. Debra made a run-in and attacked Jarrett's valet Miss Kitty, and hit Jarrett with his own guitar. Chyna took advantage and pinned Jarrett to win the Intercontinental Championship. However, the head referee Tom Prichard counseled the match's official Harvey Wippleman to change his ruling. Wippleman was forced to reverse the decision and he disqualified Chyna due to Debra's interference. As a result, Jarrett won the match and retained the title by disqualification. Chyna put out her anger on Prichard by hitting him with a Pedigree.

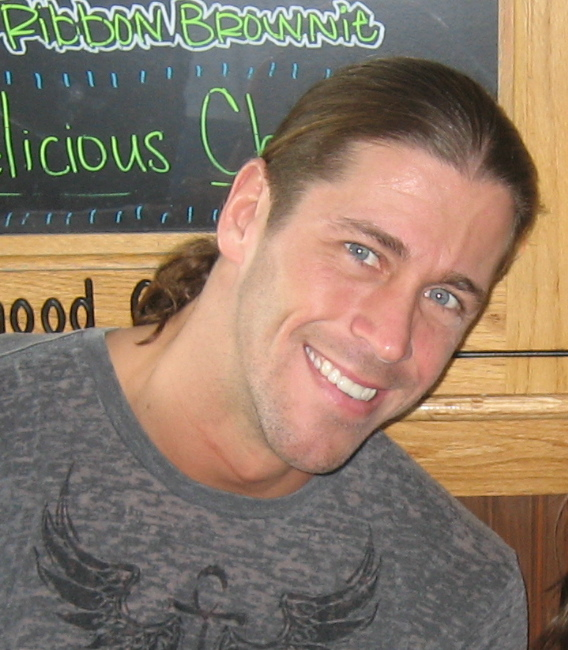
Stevie Richards interfered in The Dudley Boyz (Bubba Ray Dudley and D-Von Dudley) versus The Acolytes (Faarooq and Bradshaw) at Unforgiven.

The fourth match was between The Acolytes (Faarooq and Bradshaw) and The Dudley Boyz (Bubba Ray Dudley and D-Von Dudley). The only non-striking WWF official Jim Korderas refereed the match. As they entered the ring, Acolytes quickly began attacking the Dudley Boyz. Bradshaw and Bubba Ray started the match as the legal participants. Faarooq was thrown out of the ring and D-Von interfered in the match, and, along with Bubba Ray, hit Bradshaw with a Dudley Death Drop (3D). The Dudley Boyz continued to double-team Bradshaw until Faarooq was tagged in as the legal man. Faarooq was also hit with a 3D. However, Bradshaw recovered and hit Bubba Ray with a Clothesline from Hell. Stevie Richards interfered in the match as an Acolyte, and hit D-Von with a Stevie Kick, allowing Faarooq to pin D-Von for the victory.

The next match was a hardcore match for the WWF Women's Championship, as Ivory defended the title against Luna Vachon. Harvey Wippleman refereed the match. The match started in the backstage area. Ivory and Luna brawled with each other and hit each other with several weapons present in the area. Tori interfered in the match and tried to hit Ivory, but Ivory attacked her and hit Luna with a wooden pole to pin her and retain the Women's Championship.

=== Main event matches ===
The sixth match was between New Age Outlaws (Billy Gunn and Road Dogg) and the team of Edge and Christian for the WWF Tag Team Championship. Jim Korderas refereed the match. Edge and Christian double-teamed Road Dogg throughout the match until the Outlaws began attacking Edge and Christian together. Christian hit Billy Gunn with an Unprettier. Road Dogg attempted to hit Christian with a pumphandle Slam, but Christian slipped out of the move and Edge speared Road Dogg. The New Brood (Matt Hardy and Jeff Hardy) interfered in the match and attacked Edge and Christian behind the referee's back. Billy Gunn took advantage and hit Edge with a Fameasser to win the match and as a result, New Age Outlaws retained the Tag Team Championship.

Next was a Kennel from Hell match for the WWF Hardcore Championship between Al Snow and The Big Boss Man. The match consisted of a steel cage surrounded by the Hell in a Cell cage and dogs were around the ring within the cell. The first competitor to escape the steel cage and the cell would be declared the winner. Snow tried to keep Boss Man outside of the ring but after several attempts, Boss Man finally entered the ring and attacked Snow. Boss Man handcuffed Snow to the top turnbuckle and tried to climb out of the cell. However, Snow unlocked himself and knocked out Boss Man with Head and escaped both cages to retain the Hardcore Championship.

The final match on the undercard was Chris Jericho versus X-Pac. Tom Prichard refereed the match. X-Pac dominated the earlier part of the match until Jericho's bodyguard Mr. Hughes interfered in the match and leveled X-Pac. Jericho began attacking X-Pac. Jericho attempted to hit X-Pac with a diving splash, but X-Pac countered with a spinning wheel kick. X-Pac attacked Jericho in the corner and tried to hit a Bronco Buster, but Jericho avoided the move and hit a double underhook backbreaker. X-Pac tried to hit a hurricanrana, but Jericho countered it into a double powerbomb. Jericho climbed the top rope, but X-Pac hit a top-rope Bronco Buster. Mr. Hughes attacked the referee, Tom Prichard, and Jericho was disqualified. Jericho and Hughes attacked X-Pac until Road Dogg came out to rescue X-Pac from the two.

Triple H won the Six-Pack Challenge for the vacated WWF Championship at Unforgiven.

The main event was a Six-Pack Challenge for the vacated WWF Championship. The match was contested between Triple H, The Rock, Mankind, Kane, Big Show and British Bulldog. Jim Korderas refereed the match. "Stone Cold" Steve Austin served as the special outside enforcer. The Rock and Bulldog started the match as the legal men. The match went back and forth with all six competitors being tagged into the match throughout the match. During the match, all the striking referees interfered in the match and insulted Jim Korderas. Mankind then stuffed a smelly sweat sock down The Rock's throat, and all the wrestlers hit their finishing moves until Big Show removed Triple H, The Rock, Bulldog, and Kane out of the ring and chokeslammed Mankind. Big Show had nearly won the match as Korderas counted to 2 until the striking referees pulled out Korderas and attacked him outside the ring. Austin chased away the attacking referees and took over Korderas' position to officiate the match. The Rock hit Triple H with a Rock Bottom and a People's Elbow and pinned Triple H. However, as Austin counted to 2, Big Show pulled him outside the ring. Bulldog hit The Rock with a chair, allowing Triple H to hit The Rock with a Pedigree. Austin attacked Bulldog with the chair and counted 3 for Triple H to make him the new WWF Champion. After the match, Triple H taunted Austin with the WWF Championship belt, causing Austin to hit Triple H with a Stone Cold Stunner.

== Aftermath ==
After Triple H won the Six-Pack Challenge for the vacant WWF Championship at Unforgiven, The Rock wrestled Triple H in a match for the title on the September 27 episode of Raw is War. However, the match ended in a no contest after interference by the British Bulldog. This earned Bulldog a title match with Triple H on the September 30 episode of SmackDown!, but the special guest referee The Rock left the match. Bulldog began his villainous turn by costing The Rock a title match against Triple H in a Steel Cage match at Rebellion. This led to a match between The Rock and Bulldog at No Mercy, which The Rock won. On the other hand, "Stone Cold" Steve Austin was made the number one contender for the WWF Championship. At No Mercy, Triple H defeated Austin in an Anything Goes match to retain the WWF Championship.

The striking WWF referees went back to work before the September 27 episode of Raw Is War. Luna Vachon returned to managing her then-husband Gangrel, helping him in his matches

After getting disqualified in her WWF Intercontinental Championship match against Jeff Jarrett at Unforgiven, Chyna continued to pursue the Intercontinental Championship. On the September 27 episode of Raw is War, Chyna pinned Jarrett in a Battle of the Sexes pitting Chyna, and Debra against Jarrett, and Tom Prichard. The pre-match stipulation was that Chyna would earn another Intercontinental Championship opportunity if she pinned Jarrett, and as a result, earned the opportunity. On September 30, their match was made a Good Housekeeping match. At No Mercy, Chyna defeated Jarrett in a Good Housekeeping match to become the first and only female Intercontinental Champion in WWF. This match was Jarrett's last match in WWF, as he left the promotion, and joined rival promotion World Championship Wrestling (WCW).

WWF Women's Champion Ivory feuded with WWF Hall of Famers The Fabulous Moolah, and Mae Young, culminating at No Mercy with Moolah defeating Ivory to become the oldest WWF Women's Champion in history at age 76.

== Reception ==
In 2017, Kevin Pantoja of 411Mania gave the event a rating of 5.5 [Not So Good], stating, "Some good, some bad. The show started rough. Venis/Blackman, the European, and Women’s Titles, and Acolytes/Dudleys didn’t do anything for me. Jarrett/Chyna was about as good as they could’ve done, and I enjoyed the Tag Team Title match more than I expected. The Kennel from Hell is the only stain on the second half, and it’s historically bad. However, Jericho/X-Pac turned things around, and the main event was good enough for me to give this show a score above the average mark. Slight thumbs up, which didn’t happen often in 1999."

The Kennel From Hell match had a negative reception. It has been called one of the worst gimmick matches in history, as the dogs showed no hostility toward the competitors, and instead urinated, defecated, and even mated outside the ring. WWF booker Vince Russo called it the worst booking of his career. Wrestling Observer Newsletter awarded the match as the Worst Worked Match of the Year. PWInsider's Mike Johnson called it one of the worst PPVs ever.

== Results ==
No.	Results	Stipulations	Times
1	Val Venis defeated Steve Blackman	Singles match	6:33
2	D'Lo Brown defeated Mark Henry (c)	Singles match for the WWF European Championship	9:11
3	Jeff Jarrett (c) (with Miss Kitty) defeated Chyna by disqualification	Intergender singles match for the WWF Intercontinental Championship	11:52
4	The Acolytes (Bradshaw and Faarooq) defeated The Dudley Boyz (Bubba Ray Dudley and D-Von Dudley)	Tag team match	7:28
5	Ivory (c) defeated Luna Vachon	Hardcore match for the WWF Women's Championship	3:37
6	The New Age Outlaws (Billy Gunn and Road Dogg) (c) defeated Edge and Christian	Tag team match for the WWF Tag Team Championship	11:09
7	Al Snow (c) defeated Big Boss Man	Kennel from Hell match for the WWF Hardcore Championship	11:42
8	X-Pac defeated Chris Jericho (with Curtis Hughes) by disqualification	Singles match	13:10
9	Triple H defeated Big Show, The British Bulldog, Kane, Mankind, and The Rock	Six-pack challenge for the vacant WWF Championship "Stone Cold" Steve Austin was the special outside enforcer.	20:28
(c) / – the champion(s) heading into the match
