= Jimmy Korderas =

Canadian professional wrestling referee (born 1962)

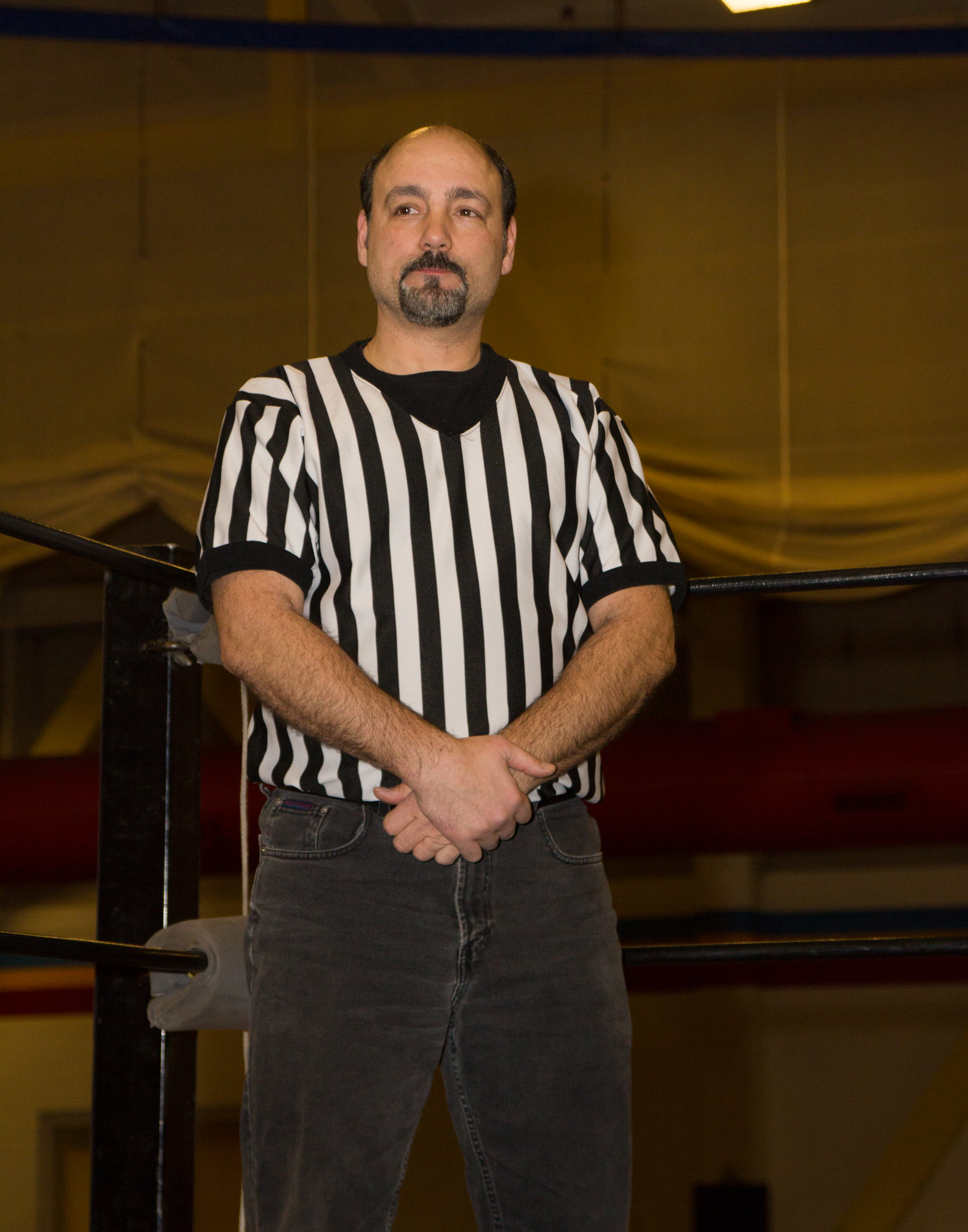
- Korderas in 2013

Personal information
- Born: Demetrius Korderas; March 19, 1962 (age 64) Toronto, Ontario, Canada

Professional wrestling career
- Ring name: Jimmy Korderas
- Billed height: 5 ft 11 in (1.80 m)
- Billed weight: 210 lb (95 kg)
- Billed from: East York, Ontario
- Trained by: Billy Red Lyons; Terry Yorkston; John Bonello
- Debut: 1985
- Retired: 2012

Demetrius Korderas (born March 19, 1962), better known by his referee name, Jimmy Korderas, is a Canadian professional wrestling referee, commentator and television personality. He is best known for his 22-year tenure in WWE from 1987 to 2009.

== Professional wrestling career ==
=== Early career ===
Korderas began working as a professional wrestling referee in 1985 at Maple Leaf Gardens. At first, he was hired as a driver by his friend Elio Zarlenga. At the time, Zarlenga was second in command only to Jack Tunney, and suggested making Korderas a referee. His first match was between Special Delivery Jones and Red Demon.

=== World Wrestling Federation/Entertainment (1987–2009) ===
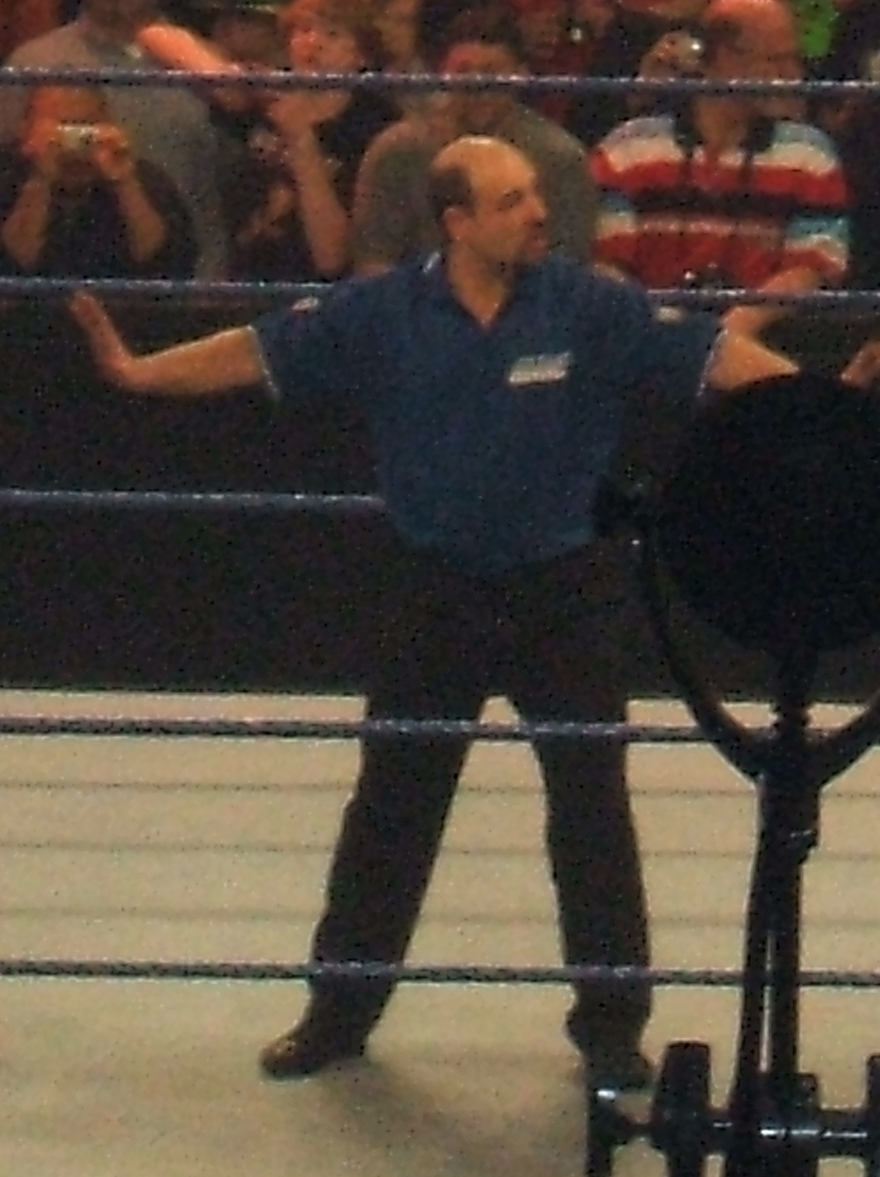
Korderas in the ring in 2008

On May 23, 1999, Korderas was the referee at Over the Edge for the match between "Blue Blazer" Owen Hart and The Godfather. He was in the ring when Hart fell 78 feet from a harness tethered above the ring and died. According to reports, Hart yelled to Korderas to move because Hart did not want to land on Korderas, but Hart's foot still made contact with Korderas' shoulder.

During a kayfabe strike by the WWF referees in late 1999, Korderas was the only regular referee who did not join the strike, which led to him being attacked by the striking refs at Unforgiven in 1999.

In 2006, the WWE pulled Korderas off the road briefly due to health issues, but he returned to work shortly thereafter. In November 2008, referees, and thus Korderas, were made no longer exclusive to particular WWE television shows, or brands. On January 9, 2009, Korderas was released from WWE.

=== Ring of Honor (2012) ===
On May 12, 2012, Korderas refereed a match at Ring of Honor's Internet Pay-Per View entitled Border Wars. He was heralded by fans chanting "Thank you, Jimmy" when he entered the ring.

== Personal life ==
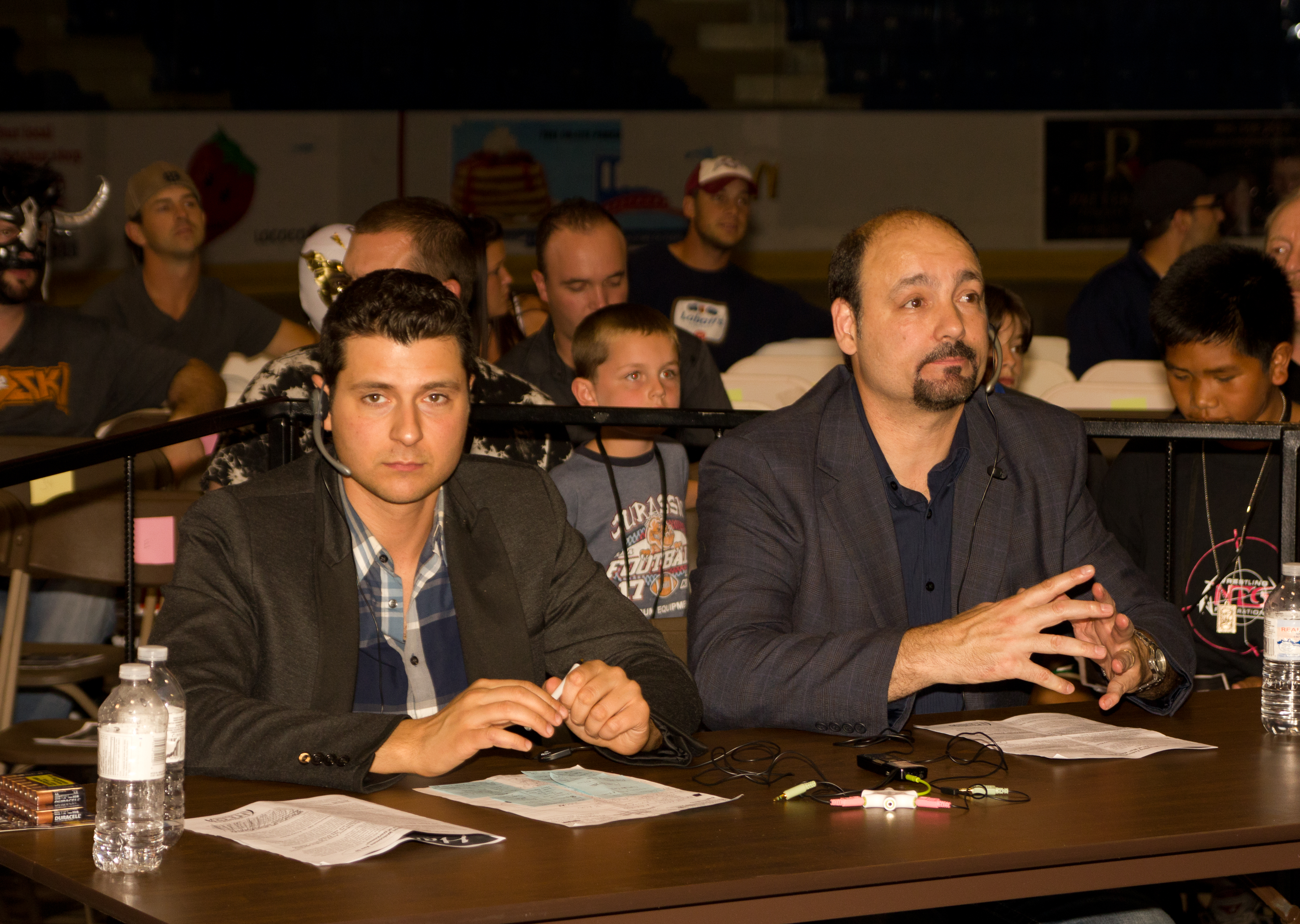
Korderas (right) and Arda Ocal ringside doing commentary at an independent wrestling show in 2012

After leaving WWE, Korderas began spending more time with his wife and family, as well as taking classes in broadcasting.

After meeting Arda Ocal, then of Sportsnet 360, Ocal brought him on as an analyst on "Right After Wrestling" on SIRIUS Radio, and also secured him a spot on the Aftermath Television Program, which Korderas appeared on until the show's cancellation in 2021.

Korderas published a book on his life and career, The Three Count - my life in stripes as a WWE referee. The foreword was written by Adam Copeland (Edge). The book was released on April 1, 2013 by ECW Press.

== Awards and accomplishments ==
- Canadian Pro-Wrestling Hall of Fame
  - Class of 2021
- Cauliflower Alley Club
  - Charlie Smith Referee Award (2026)
- New England Pro Wrestling Hall of Fame
  - Class of 2015
