= Unforgiven (2001) =

World Wrestling Federation pay-per-view event

- Promotional poster featuring "Stone Cold" Steve Austin
- Promotion: World Wrestling Federation
- Date: September 23, 2001
- City: Pittsburgh, Pennsylvania
- Venue: Mellon Arena
- Attendance: 13,855
- Buy rate: 350,000
- Tagline: The Greatest of Battles are Fought from Within.

Pay-per-view chronology
← Previous; SummerSlam	Next → No Mercy

Unforgiven chronology
← Previous; 2000	Next → 2002

The 2001 Unforgiven was a professional wrestling pay-per-view (PPV) event produced by the World Wrestling Federation (WWF, now WWE). It was the fourth annual Unforgiven and took place on September 23, 2001, at the Mellon Arena in Pittsburgh, Pennsylvania. It was the last Unforgiven held before the introduction of the brand extension in March 2002 and also the final Unforgiven held under the WWF name as the promotion was renamed to World Wrestling Entertainment (WWE) in May 2002.

The main event was a standard wrestling match for the WWF Championship. Alliance representative "Stone Cold" Steve Austin defended the title against WWF representative Kurt Angle. Angle defeated Austin to win the title by forcing him to submit to the Ankle Lock. Other prominent matches were The Rock versus Booker T and Shane McMahon in a Handicap match for the WCW Championship, and Rob Van Dam versus Chris Jericho for the WWF Hardcore Championship.

The undercard featured Tajiri versus Rhyno for the WCW United States Championship, The Brothers of Destruction (The Undertaker and Kane) versus KroniK (Brian Adams and Bryan Clark) for the WCW Tag Team Championship, Edge versus Christian for the WWF Intercontinental Championship, and Perry Saturn versus Raven. The night kicked off with The Dudley Boyz (Bubba Ray Dudley and D-Von Dudley) versus Big Show and Spike Dudley, Lance Storm and The Hurricane, and The Hardy Boyz (Jeff Hardy and Matt Hardy) in a Fatal Four-Way Elimination match for the WWF Tag Team Championship.

== Production ==
=== Background ===
Unforgiven was an annual professional wrestling pay-per-view (PPV) event first held by the World Wrestling Federation (WWF, now WWE) as the 21st In Your House PPV in April 1998. Following the discontinuation of the In Your House series in February 1999, Unforgiven continued as its own PPV event in September that year, becoming the WWF's annual September PPV. The fourth Unforgiven event took place on September 23, 2001, at the Mellon Arena in Pittsburgh, Pennsylvania.

=== Storylines ===
The professional wrestling matches at Unforgiven featured professional wrestlers performing as characters in scripted events pre-determined by the hosting promotion, World Wrestling Federation (WWF). Storylines between the characters played out on WWF's primary television programs, Raw Is War, and SmackDown!.

The predominant rivalry heading into Unforgiven was between "Stone Cold" Steve Austin and Kurt Angle over the WWF Championship. At SummerSlam, Angle challenged Austin for the WWF Championship, but in the end, Austin intentionally got disqualified in his title defense against Angle by attacking several referees. As a result, Austin retained the title. The following night, on Raw is War, Austin held an "appreciation night" on retaining the title against Angle, and was appreciated by several members of The Alliance. However, Angle interrupted the appreciation night, and ruined it by entering in a milk truck, and spraying milk on all the Alliance members. On the August 27 edition of Raw is War, Austin stole Angle's Olympic gold medals after a tag team match pitting Angle and Chris Jericho against the WWF Hardcore Champion Rob Van Dam and Tazz. Austin went on to throw Angle's medals into the Detroit River. On the September 3 edition of Raw is War, Angle threatened to throw Austin into a river in Toronto, Ontario, Canada if he did not give him a WWF Championship rematch at Unforgiven. Austin agreed to defend the title against Angle in a rematch at Unforgiven. Angle then told Austin that he was still going in the water, and proved his point by shoving Austin into a kiddie pool.

Another predominant rivalry heading into Unforgiven was between The Rock and the team of Booker T and Shane McMahon over the WCW Championship. The Rock returned to the WWF on the July 30, 2001 edition of Raw Is War, where he chose to align himself with the WWF instead of The Alliance for The Invasion. This action was shown by The Rock delivering a Rock Bottom, and the People's Elbow onto Shane McMahon, The Alliance leader. At SummerSlam, The Rock defeated Booker T to win the WCW Championship. On the August 27 edition of Raw is War, McMahon announced that The Rock would defend the title against Rhyno later in the night, but The Rock challenged McMahon to a match, which McMahon initially accepted before escaping. The Rock would retain the title against Rhyno. On the August 30 edition of SmackDown!, Booker T and McMahon cost The Rock and Chris Jericho a tag team match against the WWF Hardcore Champion Rob Van Dam and Rhyno. On the September 4 episode of SmackDown!, McMahon announced that The Rock would defend the title against Booker T and himself in a Handicap match at Unforgiven. The following week on Raw Is War, The Rock lost to Stephanie and Test in a handicap match due to interference by Shane McMahon and Booker T.

On three occasions, Chris Jericho and the WWF Hardcore Champion Rob Van Dam wrestled each other in several tag team matches with different partners. This eventually led to a title defense for Van Dam against Jericho at Unforgiven.

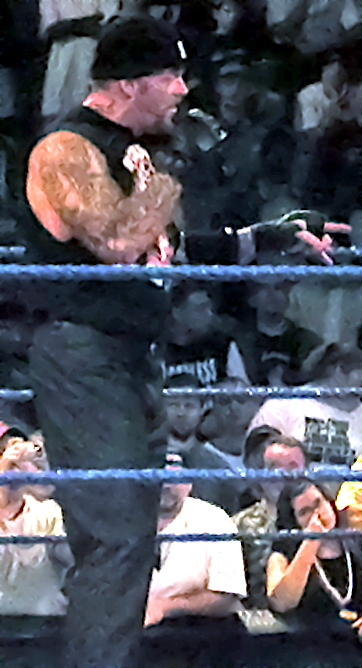
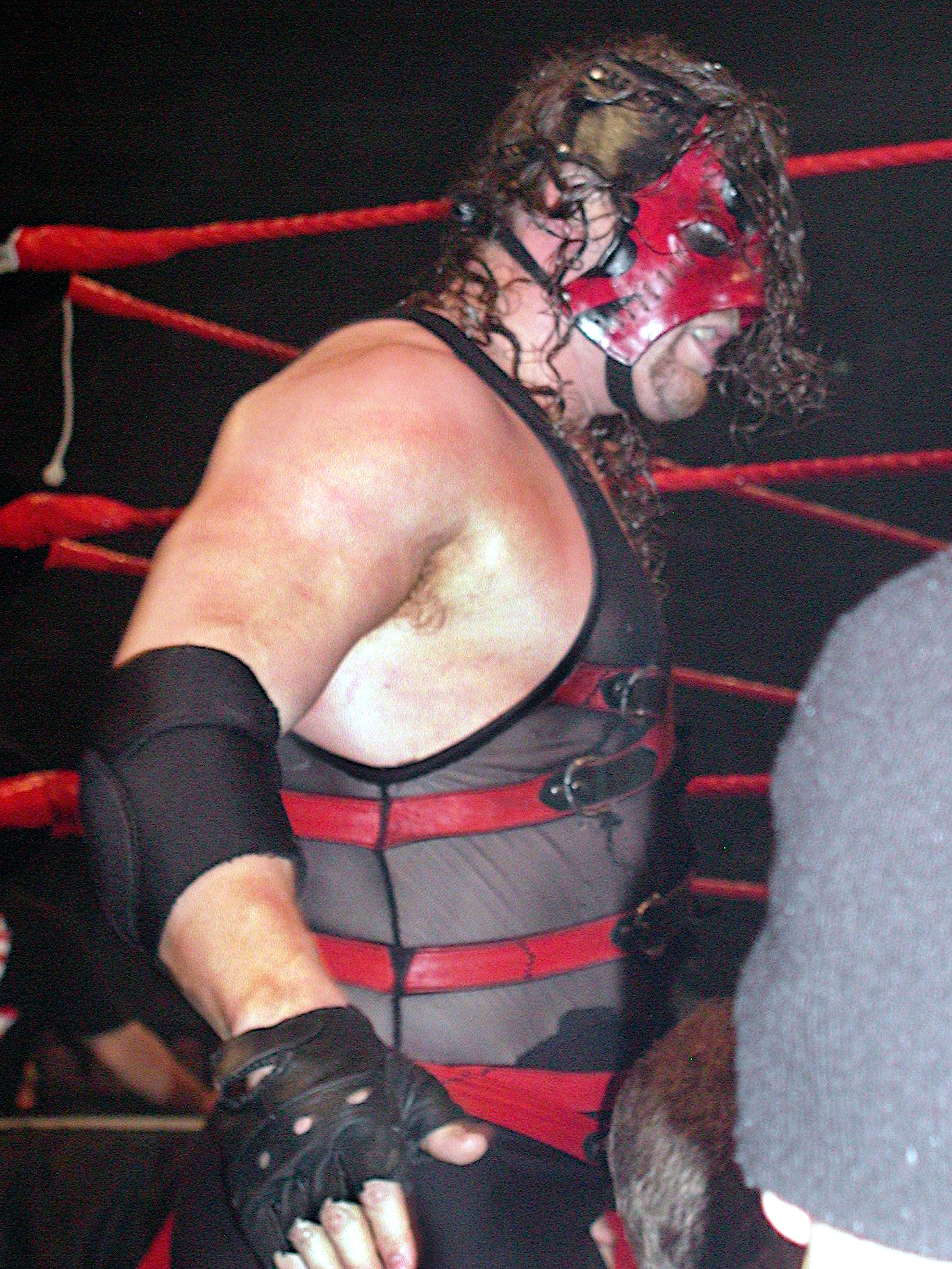
The Brothers of Destruction (The Undertaker and Kane) defended the WCW Tag Team Championship against KroniK (Brian Adams and Bryan Clark) at Unforgiven.

On the September 3 edition of Raw is War, Steven Richards attacked one half of the WCW and WWF Tag Team Champions The Brothers of Destruction, The Undertaker, during his match with Test. This led to a match between The Undertaker and Richards on the next night on SmackDown!. Before their match, Richards explained that he had attacked The Undertaker because he considered The Undertaker responsible for the disbanding of his faction Right to Censor. As The Undertaker and Richards' match started, former WCW Tag Team Champions KroniK (Brian Adams and Bryan Clark) debuted in the WWF and attacked The Undertaker. The following week on Raw Is War, Richards interfered in The Undertaker's match against Booker T. Afterwards, as The Undertaker was about to perform a Last Ride on Richards, Adams, and Clark took down The Undertaker with the clothesline, and finished him off with a double chokeslam through the announce table. On the September 17 edition of Raw is War, KroniK cost Brothers of Destruction (The Undertaker and Kane) the WWF Tag Team Championship against Dudley Boyz (Bubba Ray Dudley and D-Von Dudley). After the match, the on-screen WCW Owner Shane McMahon announced that Brothers of Destruction would defend the WCW Tag Team Championship against KroniK at Unforgiven.

After Edge won the 2001 King of the Ring tournament, his tag team partner Christian started growing jealous of him, and insisted on carrying his King of the Ring trophy. Apart from winning the King of the Ring tournament, Edge found more success by defeating Lance Storm for the WWF Intercontinental Championship at SummerSlam. On the other hand, Christian failed in his respective title opportunities against Matt Hardy for the WWF European Championship, and The Rock for the WCW Championship. On the September 3 edition of Raw is War, Christian turned on Edge by hitting him a One-man Con-chair-to after Edge successfully defended the Intercontinental Championship against Lance Storm. The following night on SmackDown!, Christian announced that he attacked Edge because he wanted an Intercontinental Championship title shot, and announced that he would wrestle Edge for the title at Unforgiven. On the September 10 edition of Raw Is War, Christian defeated Billy Gunn by using his feet on the ropes for leverage. He followed it by nailing Gunn with a chair to the head, and finishing him off with the One-Man Con-chair-to. The following week, Christian was going to finish off the WCW United States Champion Tajiri with the same move until Edge returned, and attacked him from behind, only to be restrained by the referees, enabling Christian to leave the ring, and walk to the back.

On the September 17 episode of Raw Is War, Tajiri retained the WCW United States Championship against Christian by getting disqualified, but was attacked by Christian, and his ribs were injured. As Tajiri was being accompanied to the backstage by his valet, Torrie Wilson, Rhyno attacked him by hitting him with a Gore. As a result, the WCW Owner Shane McMahon announced that Tajiri would defend the United States Championship against Rhyno at Unforgiven.

On the September 17 episode of Raw Is War, Dudley Boyz (Bubba Ray Dudley and D-Von Dudley) defeated Brothers of Destruction for the WWF Tag Team Championship. During this time, two new tag teams were formed, consisting of Big Show and Spike Dudley, and the team of Lance Storm and the WWF European Champion The Hurricane. Hardy Boyz were also in contention for the titles. On the September 20 episode of SmackDown!, The Hurricane and Lance Storm defeated Spike Dudley, and The Big Show. After the match, the Dudley Boyz attacked Spike and Big Show, and followed it by double suplexing Big Show through a table. Later that night, The Hardy Boyz defeated the WWF Tag Team Champions The Dudley Boyz in a non-title match when Spike Dudley interfered. Afterwards, the Dudley Boyz retaliated by performing a 3D on Matt Hardy through a table. As a result, a Four Corners Elimination match was made between the four teams for the WWF Tag Team Championship at Unforgiven.

On the June 21 episode of SmackDown!, Perry Saturn discovered a mop during a match against Test for the WWF Hardcore Championship. He carried the mop around with him for several months. He dismissed his valet, Terri Runnels, and kept the mop, which he named Moppy, in his corner during matches. Runnels, and Raven eventually stole Moppy, and destroyed it in a wood chipper, which led to a match at Unforgiven. On the last edition of SmackDown!, after Raven lost to Rob Van Dam in a Hardcore match, Perry Saturn charged to the ring, and attacked Raven until Terri caused a distraction, enabling Raven to perform a Raven Effect on Saturn.

== Event ==
Other on-screen personnel
Role:	Name:
English commentators	Jim Ross
English commentators	Paul Heyman
Spanish commentators	Carlos Cabrera
Spanish commentators	Hugo Savinovich
Backstage interviewers	Michael Cole
Backstage interviewers	Lilian Garcia
Backstage interviewers	Jonathan Coachman
Ring announcer	Howard Finkel
Referees	Mike Chioda
Referees	Nick Patrick
Referees	Jack Doan
Referees	Earl Hebner
Referees	Tim White
Referees	Chad Patton

Before the event aired live on pay-per-view, Billy Gunn wrestled Tommy Dreamer on a live edition of Sunday Night Heat. Gunn performed a Fameasser on Dreamer to win the match.

=== Preliminary matches ===
As the event began, Jennifer Holliday performed "America the Beautiful" in honor of the victims of the World Trade Center attacks on September 11. The first match that took place was a Fatal Four-Way Elimination match for the WWF Tag Team Championship between The Dudley Boyz (Bubba Ray Dudley and D-Von Dudley), Big Show and Spike Dudley, Lance Storm and The Hurricane, and the Hardy Boyz (Matt Hardy and Jeff Hardy). Bubba Ray performed a Bubba Bomb on Matt, allowing D-Von to pin Matt to retain the title.

The second match was between Perry Saturn and Raven. Raven attempted a Raven Effect, but Saturn countered the move into a Three Handled Moss Covered Family Credenza for the win.

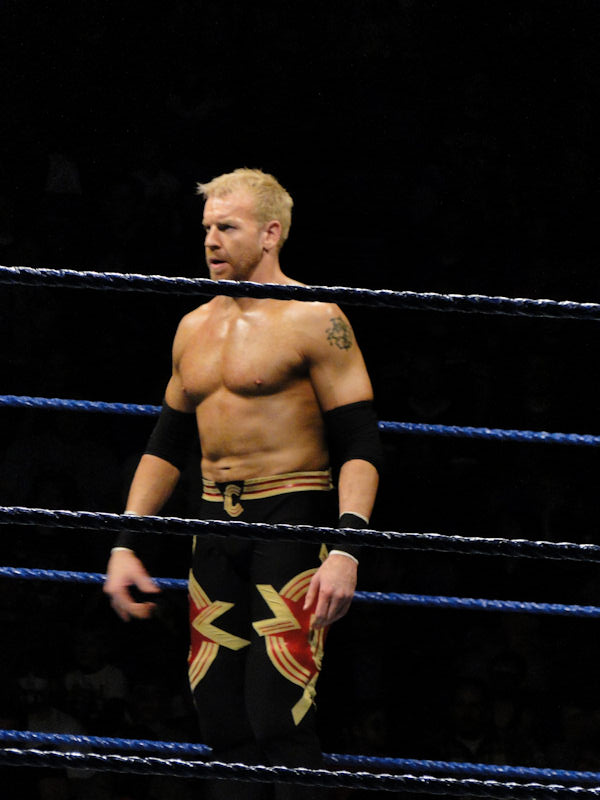
Christian challenged Edge for the WWF Intercontinental Championship

The third match featured Edge defending the WWF Intercontinental Championship against Christian. Christian performed a Edgecution on Edge for a near-fall. Christian attempted a One man con chair to, but Edge avoided the move, and attempted the same move on Christian, but the referee stopped Edge. Christian took advantage, and attacked Edge with a low blow, pinning him to win the title.

The fourth match was a tag team match for the WCW Tag Team Championship between The Brothers of Destruction (The Undertaker and Kane) and KroniK (Brian Adams and Bryan Clark). The Undertaker performed a Chokeslam on Clark to retain the title.

Next, Rob Van Dam defended the WWF Hardcore Championship against Chris Jericho. Jericho applied the Walls of Jericho on Van Dam, but Van Dam escaped the hold. Jericho attempted a Lionsault, but Van Dam avoided the move. Van Dam attempted a Five Star Frog Splash on Jericho, but Jericho avoided the move. Jericho tried to strike Van Dam with the ladder, but Van Dam knocked him down. The two battled on the ladder until Van Dam escaped the ring. Jericho hit Van Dam with a chair until Stephanie McMahon distracted Jericho. Van Dam performed a Van Daminator, and a Five-Star Frog Splash to retain the title.

=== Main event matches ===
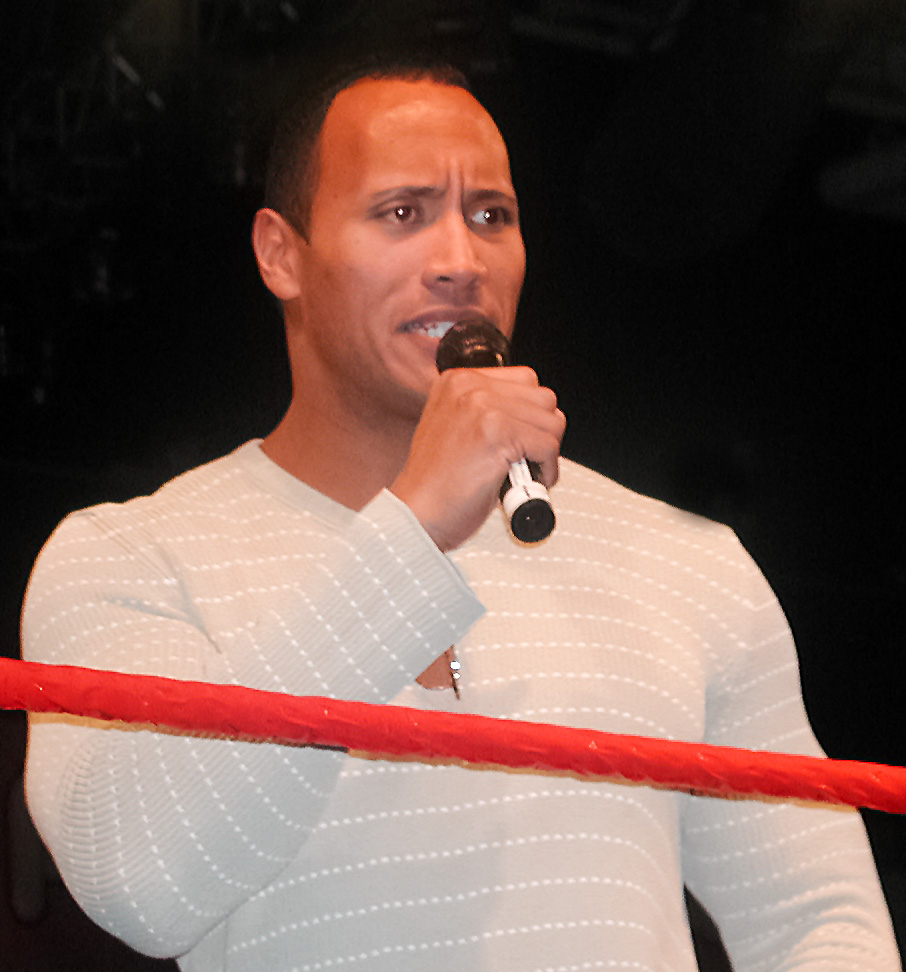
The Rock defended the WCW Championship against Booker T and Shane McMahon in a Handicap match at Unforgiven.

The sixth match featured The Rock defending the WCW Championship against Booker T and Shane McMahon in a handicap match. Shane attempted a Leap of Faith on The Rock, but The Rock avoided the move. The Rock performed a Rock Bottom on Shane, and a spinebuster on Booker T. Test interfered in the match, but Bradshaw stopped Test from interfering. Booker T tried to pin The Rock, but Mike Chioda, a WWF referee, attacked the WCW referee Nick Patrick, who was refereeing the match. Earl Hebner replaced Patrick, and took over as the official. The Rock performed a Rock Bottom on Booker T to retain the title.

In the final match on the undercard, Tajiri defended the WCW United States Championship against Rhyno. Rhyno performed a Gore on Tajiri to win the title.

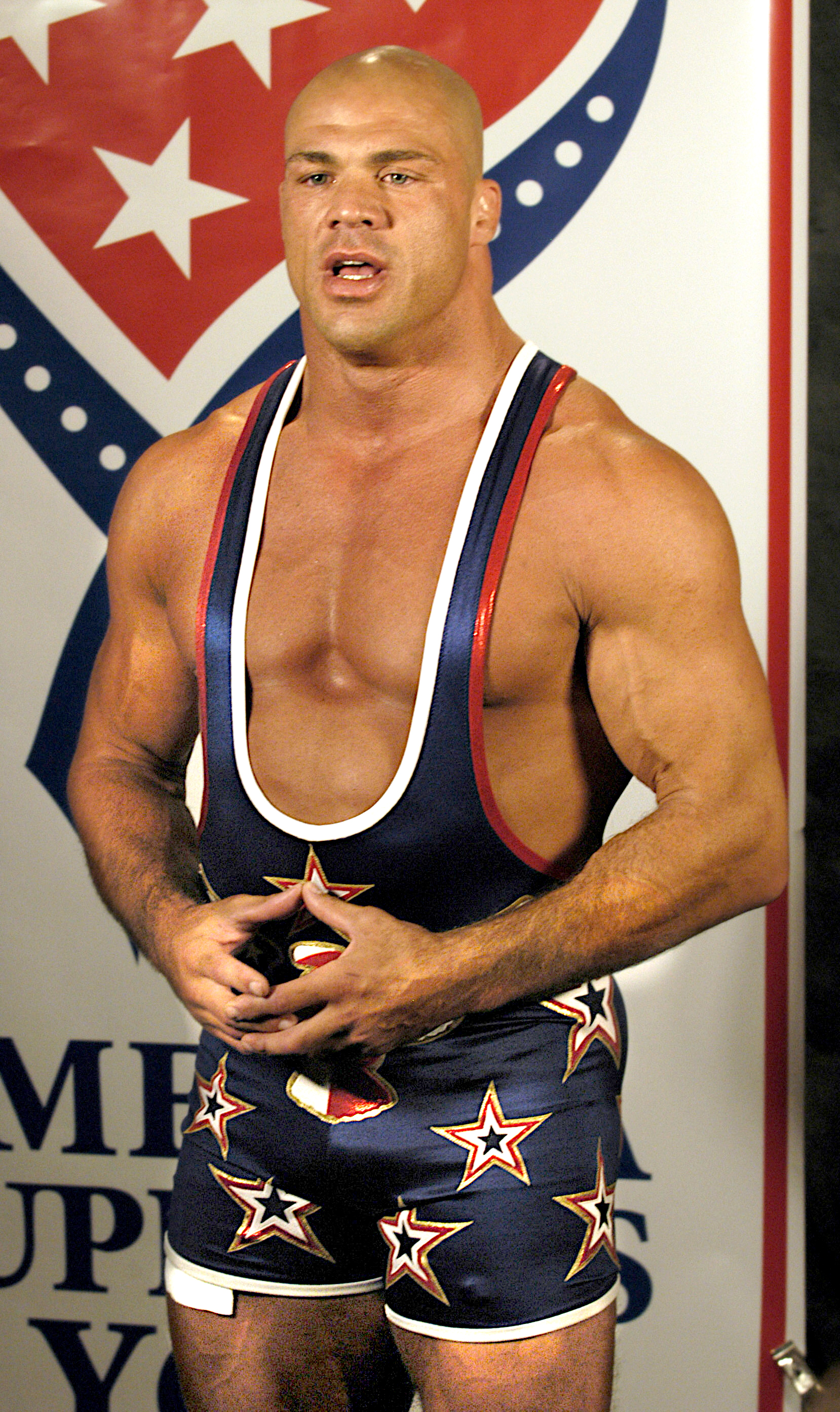
Kurt Angle challenged and defeated "Stone Cold" Steve Austin for the WWF Championship at Unforgiven.

The main event featured "Stone Cold" Steve Austin defending the WWF Championship against Kurt Angle. Kurt performed a Stone Cold Stunner on Austin for a near-fall. Austin performed an Angle Slam on Kurt for a near-fall. Austin performed a Piledriver on Kurt for a near-fall. Austin attempted a Stone Cold Stunner, but Kurt countered into an ankle lock. Austin submitted to the hold, meaning Kurt won the title. Following his title win, Kurt celebrated with his family until the entire WWF roster came out to congratulate him on his title win.

== Aftermath ==
After losing the WWF Championship to Kurt Angle, "Stone Cold" Steve Austin continued his pursuit of the title. On the October 8 episode of Raw is War, Austin defeated Angle to regain the WWF Championship, with the help of the on-screen WWF Commissioner William Regal. With this, Regal joined The Alliance, and became Alliance Commissioner. Austin was also feuding with his Alliance teammate, the WWF Hardcore Champion Rob Van Dam, over the leadership of Alliance. As a result, Mick Foley made a Triple Threat match for the WWF Championship at No Mercy, pitting Austin against Van Dam and Angle. At No Mercy, Austin pinned Van Dam after a Stone Cold Stunner to retain the WWF Championship.

After unsuccessfully challenging Rob Van Dam for the WWF Hardcore Championship at Unforgiven, Chris Jericho continued his rivalry with Van Dam, and Jericho's main event push started. On the October 11 edition of SmackDown!, Jericho defeated Van Dam in a number one contender's match for the WCW Championship. At No Mercy, Jericho defeated The Rock to win the WCW Championship.

KroniK left the WWF not long after Unforgiven. Kane and The Undertaker were reportedly unhappy with multiple mistakes made by both Adams and Clark during the match, and the WWF was planning to send them both down to their developmental territory, Heartland Wrestling Association, for further training. However, they refused, which ultimately led to their departure.

The 2001 Unforgiven was the last Unforgiven held under the WWF name, as the promotion was renamed to World Wrestling Entertainment (WWE) in May 2002. It was also the last Unforgiven held before the promotion introduced the brand extension in March 2002, a storyline subdivision in which the promotion divided its roster into two separate brands, Raw, and SmackDown!, where wrestlers were exclusively assigned to perform.

== Results ==
No.	Results	Stipulations	Times
1^{H}	Billy Gunn (WWF) defeated Tommy Dreamer (Alliance)	Singles match	3:12
2	The Dudley Boyz (Bubba Ray and D-Von) (c) (Alliance) defeated Big Show and Spike Dudley (WWF), The Hurricane and Lance Storm (Alliance), and The Hardy Boyz (Matt and Jeff) (WWF)	Four-way elimination match for the WWF Tag Team Championship	14:22
3	Perry Saturn (WWF) defeated Raven (with Terri Runnels) (Alliance)	Singles match	5:07
4	Christian (WWF) defeated Edge (c) (WWF)	Singles match for the WWF Intercontinental Championship	11:53
5	The Brothers of Destruction (The Undertaker and Kane) (c) (WWF) defeated KroniK (Brian Adams and Bryan Clark) (with Steven Richards) (Alliance)	Tag team match for the WCW Tag Team Championship	10:21
6	Rob Van Dam (c) (Alliance) defeated Chris Jericho (WWF)	Hardcore match for the WWF Hardcore Championship	16:33
7	The Rock (c) (WWF) defeated Booker T and Shane McMahon (Alliance)	Handicap match for the WCW Championship	15:24
8	Rhyno (Alliance) defeated Tajiri (c) (with Torrie Wilson) (WWF)	Singles match for the WCW United States Championship	4:50
9	Kurt Angle (WWF) defeated "Stone Cold" Steve Austin (c) (Alliance) by submission	Singles match for the WWF Championship	23:54
(c) / – the champion(s) heading into the match; H / – the match was broadcast prior to the pay-per-view on Sunday Night Heat
