= Unforgiven (2007) =

World Wrestling Entertainment pay-per-view event

- Promotional poster featuring The Undertaker
- Promotion: World Wrestling Entertainment
- Brand(s): Raw; SmackDown! ECW
- Date: September 16, 2007
- City: Memphis, Tennessee
- Venue: FedExForum
- Attendance: 12,000
- Buy rate: 210,000

Pay-per-view chronology
| ← Previous; SummerSlam | Next → No Mercy |

Unforgiven chronology
| ← Previous; 2006 | Next → 2008 |

The 2007 Unforgiven was a professional wrestling pay-per-view (PPV) event produced by World Wrestling Entertainment (WWE). It was the 10th annual Unforgiven and took place on September 16, 2007, at the FedExForum in Memphis, Tennessee, held for wrestlers from the promotion's Raw, SmackDown!, and ECW brand divisions. This was the first Unforgiven since 2002 to feature multiple brands after WWE discontinued brand-exclusive PPVs following WrestleMania 23 in April, also making it the first Unforgiven to feature ECW, which was introduced as a third brand in May 2006.

The main match on the SmackDown! brand was The Undertaker versus Mark Henry, which Undertaker won by pinfall after executing a Last Ride. The predominant match on the Raw brand was John Cena versus Randy Orton for the WWE Championship; Cena lost the match by disqualification but retained the title. The primary match on the ECW brand was CM Punk versus Elijah Burke for the ECW Championship, which Punk won after pinning Burke with a rolling cradle. The featured matches on the undercard included The Great Khali versus Batista versus Rey Mysterio in a triple threat match for the World Heavyweight Championship and Triple H versus Carlito in a match where Carlito could not be disqualified.

The event had 210,000 buys, down from the Unforgiven 2006 figure of 289,000 buys.

== Production ==
=== Background ===
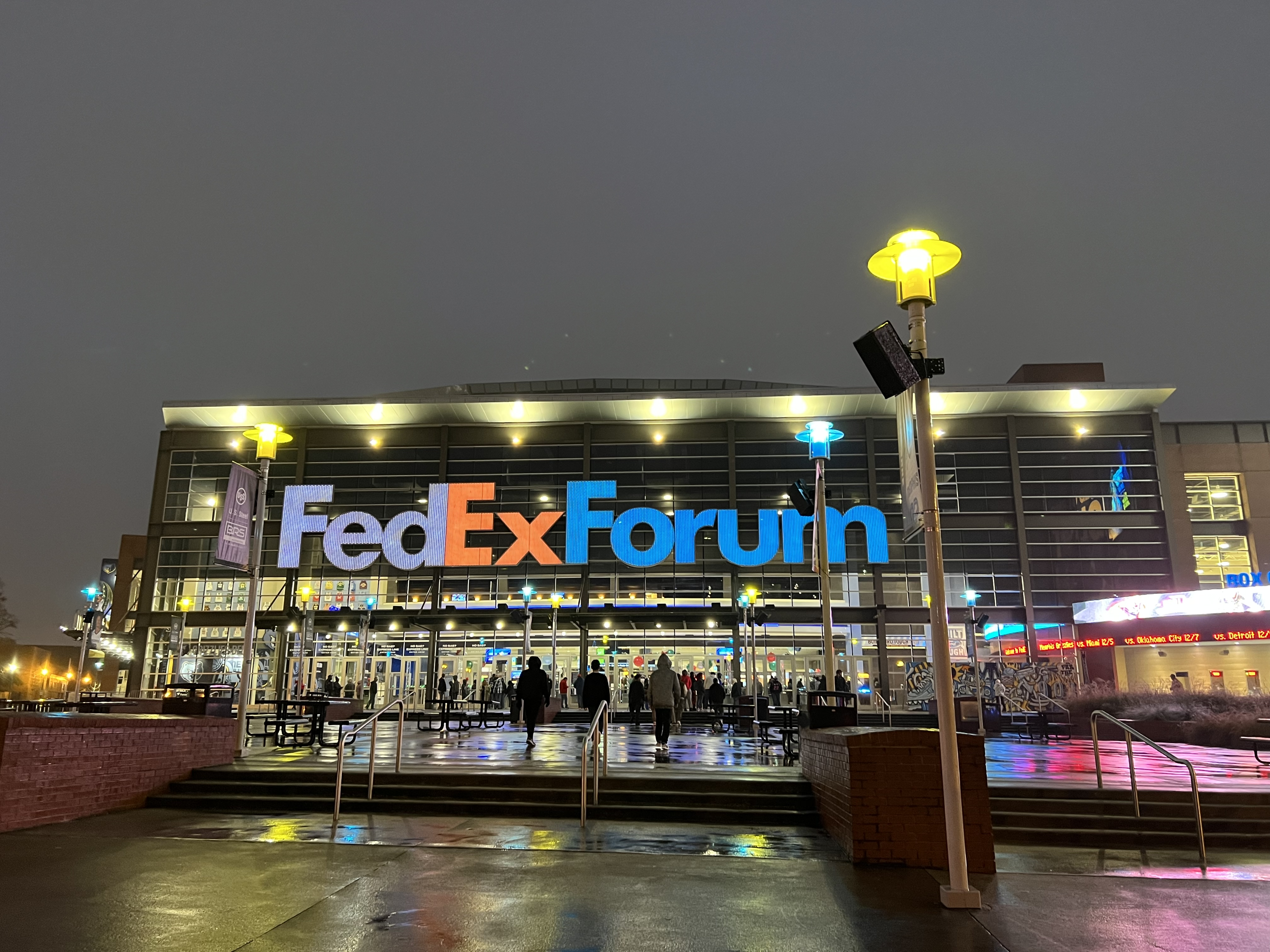
The 10th annual Unforgiven was held at the FedExForum in Memphis, Tennessee.

Unforgiven was an annual professional wrestling pay-per-view (PPV) event first held by World Wrestling Entertainment (WWE) as the 21st In Your House PPV event in April 1998. Following the discontinuation of the In Your House series in February 1999, Unforgiven continued as its own PPV event in September that year, becoming WWE's annual September PPV. The 10th event took place on September 16, 2007, at the FedExForum in Memphis, Tennessee. After being a Raw-exclusive PPV for the past four years, the 2007 event featured wrestlers from the Raw, SmackDown!, and ECW brands, as following WrestleMania 23 in April, brand-exclusive pay-per-views were discontinued. It would in turn be the first Unforgiven since the 2002 event to feature the SmackDown! brand, and the first to feature ECW, which was introduced as a third brand in May 2006.

=== Storylines ===
The main feud heading into Unforgiven on the SmackDown! brand was between The Undertaker and Mark Henry. Their rivalry started in early 2006 when Henry's interference caused The Undertaker to lose a match for the World Heavyweight Championship against Kurt Angle. This culminated in a casket match at WrestleMania 22 which The Undertaker won, extending his WrestleMania winning streak to 14–0. On the May 11, 2007, episode of SmackDown!, Henry, who made his return from an injury he sustained in mid-2006, assaulted The Undertaker after The Undertaker had retained the World Heavyweight Championship against Batista in a Steel Cage match. Following the assault, Edge cashed in his Money in the Bank contract to defeat The Undertaker and win the World Heavyweight Championship. As a result, The Undertaker was out of action for four months. In August, vignettes started airing about The Undertaker's return and his match with Henry at Unforgiven.

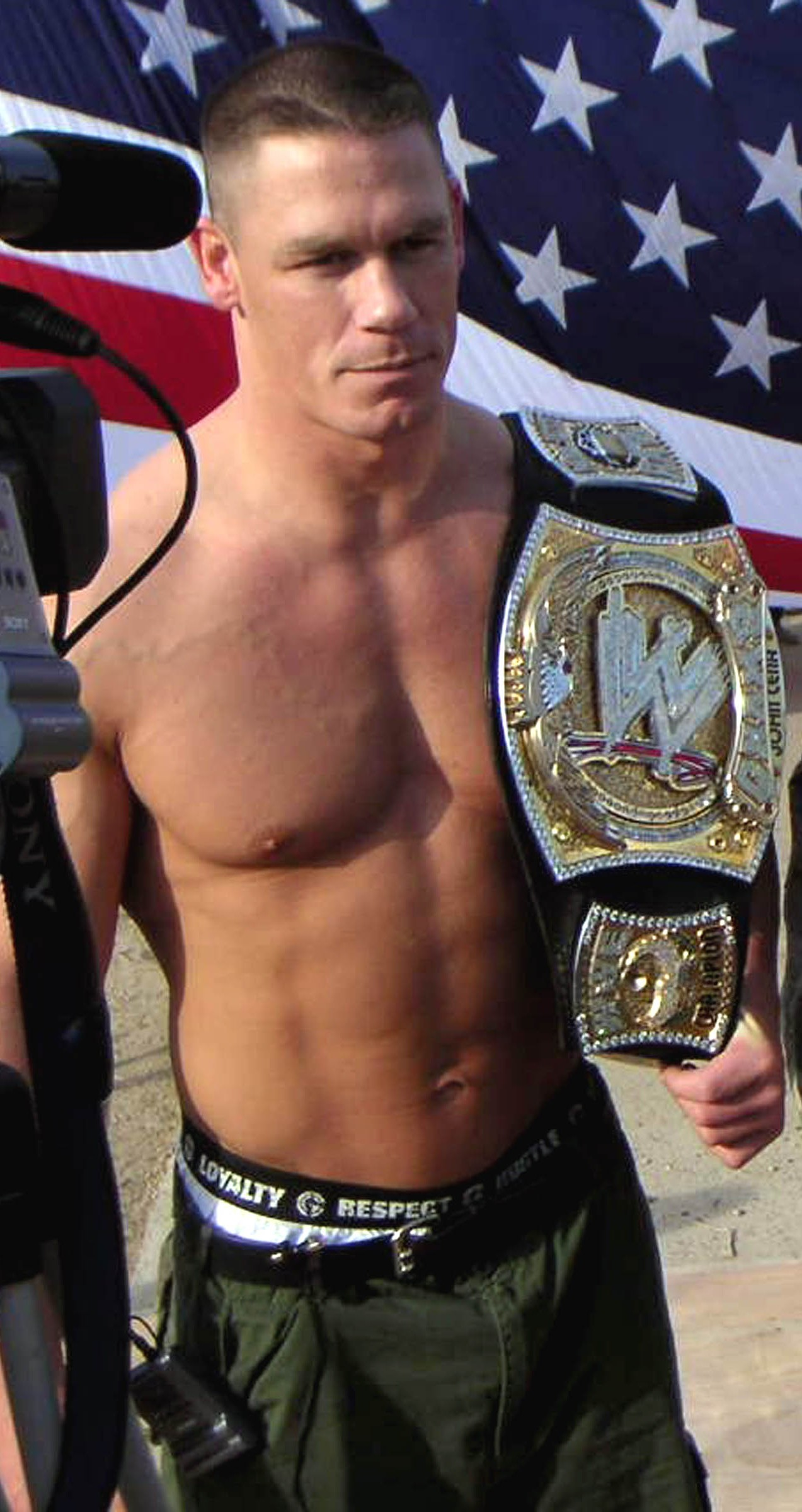
John Cena as Raw's WWE Champion.

The main feud on the Raw brand was between John Cena and Randy Orton for the WWE Championship. Cena had retained the title against Orton at SummerSlam. The following night on Raw, Orton demanded a rematch for the title, but his request was declined by General manager William Regal. Orton proceeded his demands to Mr. McMahon, who also refused to give him a rematch unless he proved himself. That night, Orton interfered in Cena's match by assaulting Cena and kicking Cena's father, who was at ringside, in the head. The following week, Orton was granted a title rematch against Cena at Unforgiven.

The main feud on the ECW brand was between CM Punk and Elijah Burke over the ECW Championship. The rivalry started on the September 11, 2007, episode of ECW on Sci Fi, when Burke became the number one contender to the title. After the fact was revealed, Punk dropkicked Burke. Later that same night, Punk teamed up with Stevie Richards in the main event against Burke and Kevin Thorn, which saw Punk and Richards win the match.

The secondary feud on the SmackDown! brand was between The Great Khali, Batista, and Rey Mysterio for the World Heavyweight Championship. After Batista was unable to win the World Heavyweight Championship from Khali at SummerSlam, he participated in a tournament in which he lost to Mysterio, the eventual winner. As a result, Mysterio got a title shot against Khali at Unforgiven. On the September 7, 2007 episode of SmackDown!, after Mysterio defeated Chavo Guerrero Jr. in an "I Quit" match, Khali put Mysterio in a Khali Vise Grip. Batista made the save, and as a result, he was made a part of the match, making it a triple threat match at Unforgiven.

== Event ==
Other on-screen personnel
| Role: | Name: |
|---|---|
| English commentators | Jim Ross (Raw) |
| English commentators | Jerry Lawler (Raw) |
| English commentators | Michael Cole (SmackDown!) |
| English commentators | John "Bradshaw" Layfield (SmackDown!) |
| English commentators | Tazz (ECW) |
| English commentators | Joey Styles (ECW) |
| Spanish commentators | Carlos Cabrera |
| Spanish commentators | Hugo Savinovich |
| Interviewers | Todd Grisham |
| Interviewers | Maria Kanellis |
| Ring announcers | Lilian Garcia (Raw) |
| Ring announcers | Tony Chimel (SmackDown!) |
| Ring announcers | Justin Roberts (ECW) |
| Referees | Scott Armstrong (ECW) |
| Referees | Jim Korderas (SmackDown!) |
| Referees | Marty Elias (Raw) |
| Referees | Chad Patton (Raw) |
| Referees | Mickie Henson (SmackDown!) |
| Referees | John Cone (Raw) |
| Referees | Mike Chioda (Raw) |
| Referees | Charles Robinson (SmackDown!) |

Before the event began, Kane defeated Kenny Dykstra in a dark match.

=== Preliminary matches ===
The first match was for the ECW Championship between CM Punk and Elijah Burke. Punk won the match after pinning Burke with a rolling cradle to retain the ECW Championship.

In the next match, Matt Hardy and Montel Vontavious Porter (MVP) faced Deuce 'n Domino for the WWE Tag Team Championship. Deuce 'n Domino dominated early in the match and mocked Hardy and MVP because of their feud over the United States Championship, which MVP held. Deuce N' Domino took advantage of Hardy and MVP's fight with each other and isolated Hardy. Hardy tossed MVP out of the ring and delivered a Twist of Fate to Deuce and pinned Deuce. In result, MVP and Hardy retained the titles.

The third match was between Triple H and Carlito in which Carlito could not be disqualified. Carlito took advantage of the situation as he could use any weapon. He attacked Triple H several times with steel chairs, and threw powder in his eyes. With the referee distracted, a blinded Triple H struck Carlito with a low blow followed by a Pedigree, leading to Triple H pinning Carlito to win the match.

The next match was for the WWE Women's Championship between Candice Michelle and Beth Phoenix. Phoenix was in control early in the match. When Phoenix had Candice on her shoulders, Candice reversed the attack and pinned Phoenix with a crucifix. As a result, Michelle won the match, and retained the WWE Women's Championship.

=== Main event matches ===
In the fifth match, The Great Khali, Batista, and Rey Mysterio fought in a triple threat match for the World Heavyweight Championship. Late in the match, Mysterio performed a 619 onto Khali, and tried to score the pinfall, only for Batista to pull Mysterio off of Khali and throw him out of the ring. Batista picked Khali up and delivered a spinebuster. Batista then pinned Khali to win the World Heavyweight Championship.

The next match was Lance Cade and Trevor Murdoch against Paul London and Brian Kendrick for the World Tag Team Championship. Cade and Murdoch had the advantage over London and Kendrick early on. At one point, Murdoch pulled Kendrick outside the ring, over the top rope, and threw him into Cade, who performed a sitout spinebuster onto Kendrick. London tried to help his partner until Cade superplexed him over the top rope. Murdoch took the advantage and pinned Kendrick for the win. As a result, Lance Cade and Trevor Murdoch retained the World Tag Team Championship.

In the next match, John Cena faced Randy Orton for the WWE Championship. Cena raging entered the ring and started beating on Orton until Orton struck Cena down. Orton covered Cena, but Cena kicked out at two. Cena angrily lost control and began beating Orton. The referee Mike Chioda tried to stop Cena from continuously punching Orton, but Cena continued and was disqualified. Therefore, Orton won the match, but not the title, because titles cannot change hands by disqualification. As a result, John Cena retained the WWE Championship. Outside the ring, Cena put Orton in the STFU while Cena's father kicked Orton in the head the same way Orton had kicked in his head on a previous episode of Raw. After the match, Jonathan Coachman booked Cena in a Last Man Standing match against Orton for the WWE Championship at No Mercy.

The main event was between The Undertaker and Mark Henry. During the match, Henry hit The Undertaker with a series of splashes and superplexes, but The Undertaker was able to continue fighting in the match. Henry put The Undertaker in the bear hug, but The Undertaker broke the hold. In the end, The Undertaker delivered a Last Ride to Henry from the top rope. The Undertaker then pinned Henry to win the match.

== Aftermath ==
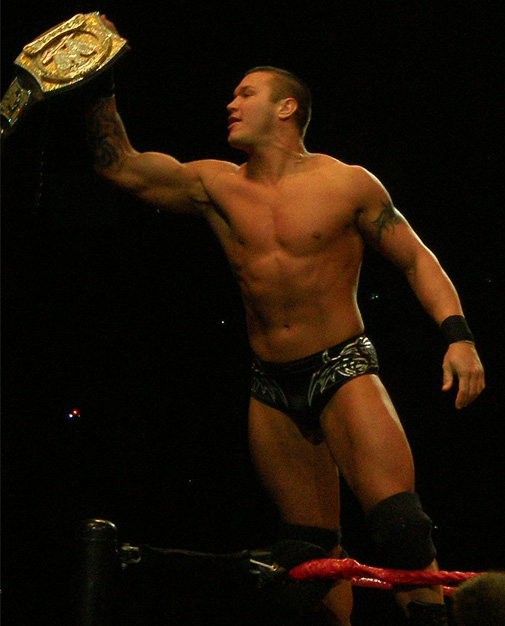
Randy Orton received Raw's vacant WWE Championship at No Mercy.

Lance Cade and Trevor Murdoch continued to feud with Paul London and Brian Kendrick while Jeff Hardy got involved in a rivalry with Mr. Kennedy. At No Mercy, London and Kendrick teamed up with Hardy to take on the team of Cade, Murdoch and Kennedy in a six-man tag team match. Cade, Murdoch and Kennedy won the match after Kennedy delivered a Green Bay Plunge to London. On the September 17 episode of Raw, Candice Michelle and Mickie James defeated Melina and Jillian in a tag team match. Beth Phoenix was at ringside during the match At No Mercy, Candice and Phoenix had a rematch for the Women's Championship, which Phoenix won to capture the title.

On the September 18 episode of ECW on Sci Fi, General manager Armando Estrada announced an "Elimination Chase" to determine the number one contender for the ECW Championship at No Mercy. The first match involved Elijah Burke, Kevin Thorn, Tommy Dreamer, and Stevie Richards. Burke eliminated Richards from the Elimination Chase after pinning him. In the second round, which was held on the September 25 episode of ECW on Sci Fi, Burke went on to eliminate Kevin Thorn in a triple threat match after pinning him. On the October 2 episode of ECW on Sci Fi, Tommy Dreamer and Elijah Burke faced each other in the final match of the tournament. Dreamer won the final match after a DDT and was made the number one contender for the title until Estrada came and said that Elimination Chase was not over. He announced that Big Daddy V would be the final man in the Elimination Chase. Big Daddy V defeated Dreamer and became the number one contender to the ECW Championship. At No Mercy, CM Punk defended the ECW Championship against Big Daddy V and retained the title after Big Daddy V got disqualified.

On the September 21 episode of SmackDown!, Michael Cole interviewed Rey Mysterio until John "Bradshaw" Layfield (JBL) said that he would conduct the interview instead. JBL claimed that he was the best wrestler ever and insulted Mysterio. Mysterio attacked JBL and challenged him to a fight until JBL introduced Finlay as Mysterio's opponent. Finlay attacked Mysterio with a shillelagh, which started a feud between the two. Finlay and Mysterio faced each other at No Mercy in a match which was fought to no contest. Also on the September 21 episode of SmackDown!, the new World Heavyweight Champion Batista faced Mark Henry in a non-title match which Batista won by disqualification. Henry was disqualified after The Great Khali interfered and attacked Batista. After the match, Khali performed a Khali Vise Grip on Batista and challenged him to a Punjabi Prison match for the World Heavyweight Championship. At No Mercy, the two faced each other in a Punjabi Prison match for the World Heavyweight Championship, which Batista won to retain the title.

John Cena and Randy Orton continued their feud over the WWE Championship, as the two were scheduled to compete in a Last Man Standing match at No Mercy for the title. The match, however, never occurred. On the October 1 episode of Raw, Cena defeated Mr. Kennedy in a non-title match. After the match, Orton attacked Cena and then counted to ten, which Cena was unable to answer to. Cena was legitimately injured in the match, and as a result, the following night on ECW on Sci Fi, Mr. McMahon vacated the WWE Championship because Cena's right pectoral tendon was legitimately torn while executing a hip toss during his match with Kennedy. At No Mercy, Mr. McMahon entered the ring and said that a new WWE Champion was to be crowned, and Orton was crowned as champion, but he was challenged by Triple H for the title on the spot. Triple H, however, defeated Orton to win the WWE Championship, but later that same night, Triple H lost the title to Orton back in a Last Man Standing match after a title defense against Umaga, who he was booked to face in a standard wrestling match.

== Results ==
| No. | Results | Stipulations | Times |
|---|---|---|---|
| 1^{D} | Kane defeated Kenny Dykstra by pinfall | Singles match | 0:27 |
| 2 | CM Punk (c) defeated Elijah Burke by pinfall | Singles match for the ECW Championship | 11:52 |
| 3 | Matt Hardy and Montel Vontavious Porter (c) defeated Deuce 'n Domino (with Cherry) by pinfall | Tag team match for the WWE Tag Team Championship | 9:19 |
| 4 | Triple H defeated Carlito by pinfall | No Disqualification match (Note: The No Disqulification stipulation only applied to Carlito; Triple H had to wrestle under normal singles match rules.) | 10:40 |
| 5 | Candice Michelle (c) defeated Beth Phoenix by pinfall | Singles match for the WWE Women's Championship | 7:17 |
| 6 | Batista defeated The Great Khali (c) (with Ranjin Singh) and Rey Mysterio by pinfall | Triple threat match for the World Heavyweight Championship | 8:01 |
| 7 | Lance Cade and Trevor Murdoch (c) defeated Paul London and Brian Kendrick by pinfall | Tag team match for the World Tag Team Championship | 11:48 |
| 8 | Randy Orton defeated John Cena (c) by disqualification | Singles match for the WWE Championship | 7:22 |
| 9 | The Undertaker defeated Mark Henry by pinfall | Singles match | 11:25 |
(c) / – the champion(s) heading into the match; D / – this was a dark match

=== Championship Competition Tournament ===
The Championship Competition Tournament was a tournament held to determine The Great Khali's challenger for the World Heavyweight Championship at Unforgiven.

Semifinals; SmackDown!
Rey Mysterio | Disqualification
Batista | 5:57
Finlay | Pinfall
Kane | 7:21

Final; SmackDown! August 28, 2007 (Aired: August 31)
Rey Mysterio | Pinfall
Finlay | 8:33
