= Unforgiven (2002) =

World Wrestling Entertainment pay-per-view event

- Promotional poster featuring Brock Lesnar
- Promotion: World Wrestling Entertainment
- Brand(s): Raw; SmackDown!
- Date: September 22, 2002
- City: Los Angeles, California
- Venue: Staples Center
- Attendance: 16,000
- Buy rate: 300,000
- Tagline: The Next Big Thing has arrived

Pay-per-view chronology
← Previous; SummerSlam	Next → No Mercy

Unforgiven chronology
← Previous; 2001	Next → 2003

The 2002 Unforgiven was a professional wrestling pay-per-view (PPV) event produced by World Wrestling Entertainment (WWE). It was the fifth annual Unforgiven and took place on September 22, 2002, at the Staples Center in Los Angeles, California, held for wrestlers from the promotion's Raw and SmackDown! brand divisions.

This was the first Unforgiven held following the introduction of the brand extension in March and was subsequently the last Unforgiven to feature multiple brands until 2007, as beginning with Bad Blood in June 2003, all monthly PPVs outside of the "Big Four" (WrestleMania, SummerSlam, Survivor Series, and Royal Rumble) became brand-exclusive until brand-exclusive PPVs were discontinued after WrestleMania 23 in April 2007. This was also the first Unforgiven held under the WWE name, after the promotion was renamed from World Wrestling Federation (WWF) to WWE earlier that year in May.

Eight professional wrestling matches were scheduled for the event—which featured a supercard, a scheduling of more than one main bout. The main event from the SmackDown! brand featured WWE Champion Brock Lesnar fighting The Undertaker to retain the title after both men were disqualified. After the match, The Undertaker continued to attack Lesnar, throwing him through the wall of a set. The main event from the Raw brand featured World Heavyweight Champion Triple H defeating Rob Van Dam to retain the title. Four matches were featured on the undercard. The first was a singles match where Chris Benoit defeated Kurt Angle. The next was between Trish Stratus and WWE Women's Champion Molly Holly, where Stratus won and captured the title. The third was a singles match between Eddie Guerrero and Edge, in which Guerrero won. The final featured undercard match had Raw's Intercontinental Champion Chris Jericho defeating Ric Flair to retain the title.

== Production ==
=== Background ===
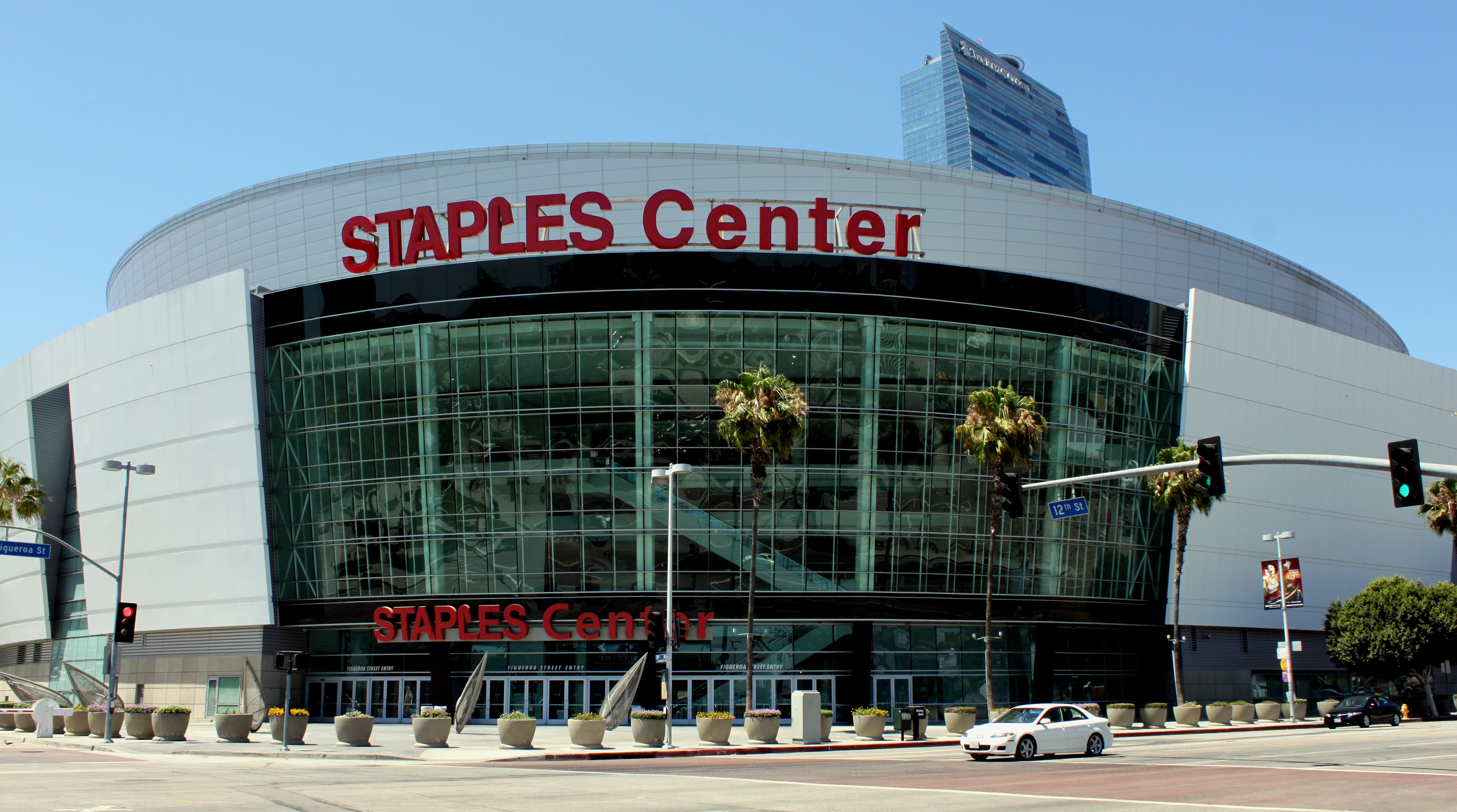
The event was held at the Staples Center in Los Angeles, California.

Unforgiven was an annual professional wrestling pay-per-view (PPV) event first held by World Wrestling Entertainment (WWE) as the 21st In Your House PPV in April 1998. Following the discontinuation of the In Your House series in February 1999, Unforgiven continued as its own PPV event in September that year, becoming WWE's annual September PPV. The fifth Unforgiven event took place on September 22, 2002, at the Staples Center in Los Angeles, California.

This was the first Unforgiven held under the WWE name, as the promotion was renamed from World Wrestling Federation (WWF) to WWE in May. It was also the first Unforgiven held during the first brand extension that was introduced in March, a storyline subdivision in which the promotion divided its roster into two separate brands, Raw and SmackDown!, where wrestlers were exclusively assigned to perform. The 2002 event in turn featured wrestlers from both brands.

=== Storylines ===
The event featured nine professional wrestling matches, with outcomes predetermined by WWE script writers. The matches featured wrestlers portraying their characters in planned storylines that took place before, during and after the event. All wrestlers were from one of WWE's brands—SmackDown! or Raw—the two storyline divisions in which WWE assigned its employees.

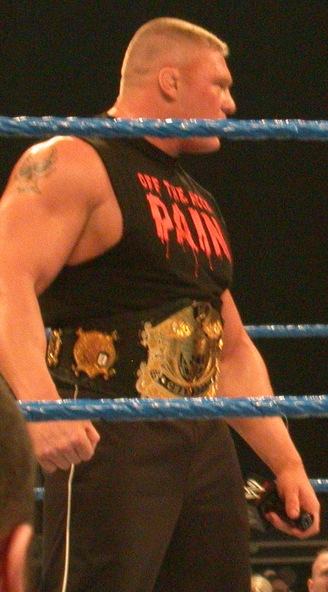
Brock Lesnar as SmackDown!'s WWE Champion

The main feud heading into Unforgiven on the SmackDown! brand was between The Undertaker and Brock Lesnar, with the two feuding over the WWE Championship. On the August 29 episode of SmackDown!, as Lesnar became exclusive to the SmackDown! brand, SmackDown! General Manager Stephanie McMahon made a single elimination series of matches to declare the number one contender for the championship. Kurt Angle and Chris Benoit made it to the final, however, McMahon inserted The Undertaker in the match, which he then won. Lesnar and The Undertaker had their first confrontation on the September 5 episode of SmackDown!. The following week, during The Undertaker's match with Matt Hardy, Lesnar's manager, Paul Heyman, threatened The Undertaker's wife, Sara, and Lesnar attacked The Undertaker when he tried to save her. On the September 19 episode of SmackDown!, The Undertaker tried to attack Lesnar, but was stopped by Lesnar's security.

The main feud heading into Unforgiven on the Raw brand was between Triple H and Rob Van Dam for the World Heavyweight Championship. On the September 2 episode of Raw, Triple H was awarded the newly created World Heavyweight Championship by Raw General Manager Eric Bischoff, and subsequently retained it against Ric Flair. Later that night, Van Dam and Flair defeated Triple H and Chris Jericho in a tag team match, when Van Dam pinned Triple H. On the September 9 episode of Raw, Van Dam defeated Jericho, Jeff Hardy and Big Show in a fatal four-way elimination match to become the number one contender for the World Heavyweight Championship. On the September 16 episode of Raw, Triple H cost Van Dam his WWE Intercontinental Championship against Jericho and in retaliation, Van Dam attacked Triple H following his World Heavyweight Championship defense against Hardy.

Another main feud on the SmackDown! brand was between SmackDown! General Manager Stephanie McMahon and Raw General Manager Eric Bischoff. The feud started when Billy and Chuck had a commitment ceremony on the September 12 episode of SmackDown!. The priest of the ceremony was later revealed to be Bischoff in disguise, and Bischoff had 3-Minute Warning (Jamal and Rosey) attack Billy and Chuck, setting up a tag team match at Unforgiven. On the September 16 episode of Raw, Bischoff proposed a stipulation for the match: if 3 Minute Warning won, Stephanie would be forced to participate in "Hot Lesbian Action" with two other lesbians, but if Billy and Chuck won, Bischoff would have to kiss Stephanie's buttocks.

Another feud on the Raw brand was between Molly Holly and Trish Stratus for the WWE Women's Championship. Four months prior, Holly and Stratus began a feud which lead to a Women's Championship match between the two at King of the Ring in which Holly defeated Stratus to win the title. On the June 24 episode of Raw, Holly proclaimed that she had bought dignity and respect back to the Women's Championship by not being a "tramp who sleeps her way to the top" referring to Stratus. On the July 15 episode of Raw, Holly successfully defended her title against Stratus. On the September 2 episode of Raw, Stratus and Bubba Ray Dudley defeated Chris Nowinski and Holly in a mixed tag team match.

== Event ==
Other on-screen personnel
Role:	Name:
English commentators	Jim Ross (Raw)
English commentators	Jerry Lawler (Raw)
English commentators	Michael Cole (SmackDown!)
English commentators	Tazz (SmackDown!)
Spanish commentators	Carlos Cabrera
Spanish commentators	Hugo Savinovich
Interviewers	Jonathan Coachman
Interviewers	Lilian Garcia
Ring announcers	Howard Finkel (Raw)
Ring announcers	Tony Chimel (SmackDown!)
Referees	Charles Robinson
Referees	Mike Chioda
Referees	Nick Patrick
Referees	Jack Doan
Referees	Earl Hebner
Referees	Chad Patton
Referees	Brian Hebner
Referees	Jim Korderas
General Managers	Eric Bischoff (Raw)
General Managers	Stephanie McMahon (SmackDown!)

Before the event aired live on pay-per-view, Rey Mysterio defeated Chavo Guerrero in a dark match.

=== Preliminary matches ===
The first match that aired was The Un-Americans (Lance Storm, Christian, William Regal and Test) against the team of Kane, Goldust, Booker T and Bubba Ray Dudley. Mid-way into the match, a brawl between both teams occurred. Storm attempted a superkick on Kane, but Kane countered the move and pinned Storm after a chokeslam to win the match.

The second match was for the WWE Intercontinental Championship, in which Chris Jericho defended the title against Ric Flair. During the match, Flair targeted Jericho's left leg. Jericho missed a Lionsault on Flair, which further injured Jericho's left leg. Whilst a trainer distracted the referee, Jericho revealed that he was faking his injury and applied the Walls of Jericho on Flair, who submitted to the move, resulting in Jericho retaining the championship.

A singles match between Edge and Eddie Guerrero followed. Edge performed an Edgecution on Guerrero, but Guerrero placed his foot on the bottom rope to void the pinfall. Guerrero exposed a turnbuckle, which Edge later collided with. Guerrero won the match after executing a sunset flip powerbomb on Edge off the top rope.

The fourth match was between Billy and Chuck and 3-Minute Warning (Rosey and Jamal) (with Rico). Per the pre-match stipulation, Stephanie McMahon would be forced to participate in "Hot Lesbian Action" with two other lesbians if 3-Minute Warning won. Jamal attempted to perform a pop-up Samoan drop on Gunn, who countered the move into a Fameasser on Jamal. Rico distracted Gunn, leading to Gunn confronting Rico. Jamal pinned Gunn after a pop-up Samoan drop to win the match.

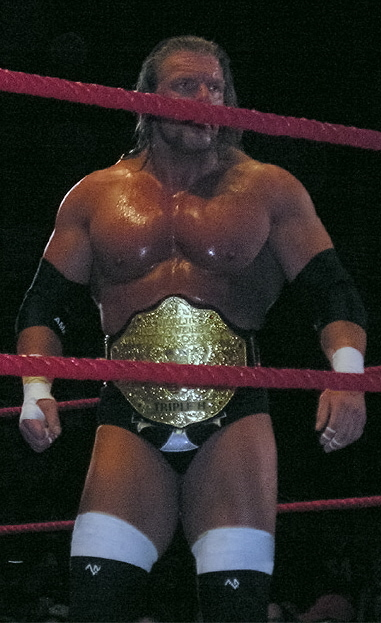
Triple H, who defended Raw's World Heavyweight Championship against Rob Van Dam

Next, Triple H defended the World Heavyweight Championship against Rob Van Dam. After a back-and-forth match, Triple H knocked down the referee. Triple H attempted a Pedigree on Van Dam, but Van Dam countered the move and performed a Five Star Frog Splash on Triple H. As Van Dam checked on the referee, Triple H executed a low blow on Van Dam. Triple H attempted to hit Van Dam with a sledgehammer, but Van Dam performed a spinning heel kick on Triple H. Ric Flair ran down to the ring and retrieved the sledgehammer, appearing as if he was going to hit Triple H with it. Instead, Flair hit Van Dam with the sledgehammer, turning Flair heel in the process. Triple H pinned Van Dam after a Pedigree to win the match and retain the title.

The sixth match was for the WWE Women's Championship, in which Molly Holly defended the title against Trish Stratus. Stratus performed a Stratusfaction on Holly to win the match and the championship.

In the penultimate match, Kurt Angle faced Chris Benoit. Benoit performed a diving headbutt on Angle for a near-fall. Benoit applied the Crippler Crossface on Angle, but Angle countered the hold into an ankle lock on Benoit. Benoit countered the hold into the Crippler Crossface, but Angle again countered the hold into an ankle lock on Benoit, with Benoit touching the ropes to force Angle to break the hold. As Angle applied the Crippler Crossface on Benoit, Benoit attempted to touch the ropes, but Angle pushed the ropes away and continued to apply the crossface on Benoit. After an argument between Angle and the referee, Benoit pinned Angle using the ropes for leverage to win the match.

Due to Billy and Chuck's loss to 3-Minute Warning earlier in the night, an in-ring segment occurred where Stephanie McMahon had to participate in "Hot Lesbian Action" with two other lesbians. Eric Bischoff brought out another woman named 'Hildegaard' and told her to make out with Stephanie, which Stephanie did voluntarily. The "woman" would then hit Bischoff with a superkick and revealed herself as Rikishi in a costume. Stephanie and Rikishi then celebrated in the ring.

=== Main event match ===
The main event was for the WWE Championship, in which Brock Lesnar (with Paul Heyman) defended the title against The Undertaker. Early in the match, Lesnar applied a bear hug on The Undertaker, who swung Lesnar through the ropes to break the hold. While Heyman distracted the referee, Lesnar hit The Undertaker with the title belt, causing The Undertaker to bleed. After Lesnar collided with the referee, who was knocked down, The Undertaker performed a chokeslam on Lesnar. Matt Hardy attempted to interfere in the match, but The Undertaker performed a Last Ride on Hardy. Lesnar then executed a spinebuster on The Undertaker for a near-fall. The Undertaker attempted to perform a Tombstone piledriver, but Lesnar pushed The Undertaker into the referee, who was knocked down again. Lesnar attempted to hit The Undertaker with a steel chair, but The Undertaker performed a big boot on Lesnar and hit him in the head with the chair, causing Lesnar to bleed. After Lesnar attacked the referee, the referee ruled the match a double disqualification, but Lesnar retained the WWE Championship. After the match, The Undertaker threw Lesnar through the stage set.

== Aftermath ==
=== Raw ===
On the September 23 episode of Raw, World Heavyweight Champion Triple H and Ric Flair defeated Rob Van Dam and Bubba Ray Dudley in a tag team match. After the match, Van Dam attacked Triple H and performed a diving leg drop on Triple H through the announce table. On the October 14 episode of Raw, Raw General Manager Eric Bischoff scheduled a match between Van Dam and Flair at No Mercy. Later that night, Triple H defeated Van Dam in a Canadian lumberjack match, after Flair hit Van Dam in the head with the World Heavyweight Championship belt. At No Mercy, Van Dam defeated Flair.

Also beginning on the September 23 episode of Raw, the WWE Women's Championship became exclusive to the Raw brand.

=== SmackDown ===
On the SmackDown! following Unforgiven, The Undertaker defeated Matt Hardy, who had interfered in his WWE Championship match against Brock Lesnar at Unforgiven. After the match, Lesnar attacked The Undertaker with the title belt. The following week, Lesnar helped Hardy defeat The Undertaker in a Falls Count Anywhere match, after executing an F-5 on The Undertaker. After the match, Lesnar broke The Undertaker's hand with a propane tank. Later that night, Lesnar was informed by SmackDown! General Manager Stephanie McMahon that he would defend the title against The Undertaker, despite his broken hand, in a Hell in a Cell match at No Mercy. On the October 17 episode of SmackDown!, Lesnar and Heyman demanded that Stephanie ban The Undertaker from using his cast as a weapon inside Hell in a Cell. However, following Lesnar's match with Chuck Palumbo later that night, The Undertaker attacked Lesnar with the cast, after which Stephanie ultimately allowed The Undertaker to wear the cast. At No Mercy, Lesnar defeated The Undertaker to retain the WWE Championship.

Kurt Angle and Chris Benoit were paired together in a tournament to crown the inaugural WWE Tag Team Champions. They defeated Billy Kidman and John Cena in the first round, Los Guerreros (Eddie and Chavo) in the semi-finals, and Edge and Rey Mysterio in the finals at No Mercy to become the inaugural champions.

=== Future ===
While the 2002 Unforgiven had featured wrestlers from both Raw and SmackDown!, until the 2007 event, the 2003 event was held exclusively for the Raw brand.

== Results ==
No.	Results	Stipulations	Times
1^{H}	Rey Mysterio defeated Chavo Guerrero	Singles match	08:58
2	Kane, Goldust, Booker T and Bubba Ray Dudley defeated The Un-Americans (Lance Storm, Christian, William Regal and Test)	Eight-man tag team match	09:59
3	Chris Jericho (c) defeated Ric Flair by submission	Singles match for the WWE Intercontinental Championship	06:16
4	Eddie Guerrero defeated Edge	Singles match	11:55
5	3-Minute Warning (Rosey and Jamal) (with Rico) defeated Billy and Chuck	Tag team match	06:38
6	Triple H (c) defeated Rob Van Dam	Singles match for the World Heavyweight Championship	18:17
7	Trish Stratus defeated Molly Holly (c)	Singles match for the WWE Women's Championship	05:46
8	Chris Benoit defeated Kurt Angle	Singles match	13:55
9	Brock Lesnar (c) (with Paul Heyman) vs. The Undertaker ended in a double disqualification	Singles match for the WWE Championship	20:27
(c) / – the champion(s) heading into the match; H / – the match was broadcast prior to the pay-per-view on Sunday Night Heat
