= Unforgiven (2004) =

World Wrestling Entertainment pay-per-view event

- Promotional poster featuring Kane
- Promotion: World Wrestling Entertainment
- Brand: Raw
- Date: September 12, 2004
- City: Portland, Oregon
- Venue: Rose Garden
- Attendance: 10,000
- Buy rate: 239,000
- Tagline: Insane. Pain. Kane.

Pay-per-view chronology
← Previous; SummerSlam	Next → No Mercy

Unforgiven chronology
← Previous; 2003	Next → 2005

The 2004 Unforgiven was a professional wrestling pay-per-view (PPV) event produced by World Wrestling Entertainment (WWE). It was the seventh annual Unforgiven and took place on September 12, 2004, at the Rose Garden in Portland, Oregon, held exclusively for wrestlers from the promotion's Raw brand division. It is one of only two WWE pay-per-view events to be held in the U.S. state of Oregon, the other being No Mercy in 2008.

The main event saw Randy Orton defend the World Heavyweight Championship. against Triple H, which Triple H won by pinfall after executing a Pedigree onto a steel chair. One of the predominant matches on the card was Shawn Michaels versus Kane in a No Disqualification match, which Michaels won after performing Sweet Chin Music. Another primary match on the undercard was Chris Jericho versus Christian in a Ladder match for the vacant WWE Intercontinental Championship, which Jericho won by retrieving the suspended belt.

== Production ==
=== Background ===
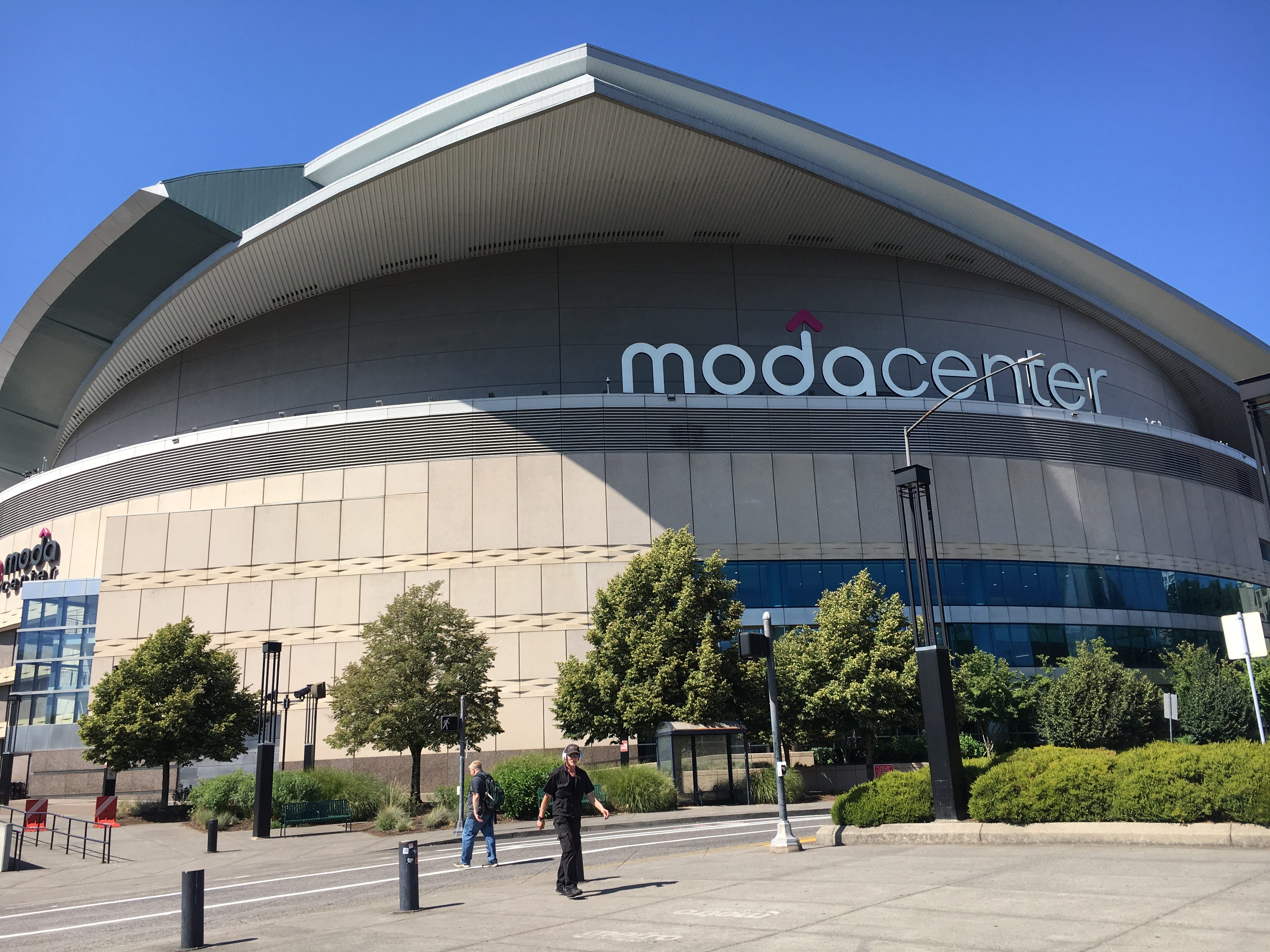
The seventh Unforgiven was held at the Rose Garden in Portland, Oregon.

Unforgiven was an annual professional wrestling pay-per-view (PPV) event first held by World Wrestling Entertainment (WWE) as the 21st In Your House PPV event in April 1998. Following the discontinuation of the In Your House series in February 1999, Unforgiven continued as its own PPV event in September that year, becoming WWE's annual September PPV. The seventh event took place on September 12, 2004, at the Rose Garden in Portland, Oregon. Like the previous year's event, it featured wrestlers exclusively from the Raw brand.

=== Storylines ===
Seven professional wrestling matches were scheduled on the event's card beforehand, which were planned with predetermined outcomes by WWE's script writers. The buildup to these matches and scenarios that took place before, during and after the event were also planned by the script writers. The event featured wrestlers and other talent from the Raw brand – a storyline expansion in which WWE assigned its employees.

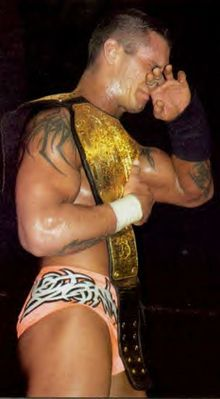
Randy Orton, who defended the World Heavyweight Championship against Triple H at the event.

The main feud heading into the event was between Randy Orton and Triple H over the World Heavyweight Championship. At SummerSlam, Orton defeated Chris Benoit to win the World Heavyweight Championship, thus making Orton the youngest World Heavyweight Champion in WWE history. On the August 16 episode of Raw, Orton successfully retained the title in a rematch with Benoit. After the match, Evolution (Batista, Ric Flair, and Triple H), Orton's fellow stablemates, threw him a fake celebration, only to reveal that they were not pleased with his new victory. While Batista had Orton propped on his shoulders in elation, Triple H gave him a pleased thumbs up; Triple H, however, abruptly changed the thumbs up to a thumbs-down and told Batista to drop Orton to the mat. Flair and Batista then began to beat Orton in the ring as Triple H claimed that Orton was nothing without Evolution. Orton's break-up with Evolution began a new storyline for him as a face when he began to feud with his former group members. On the August 23 episode of Raw, after Orton refused to give Triple H the World Heavyweight Championship, Orton spat in Triple H's face and hit him with the title belt. Raw General Manager Eric Bischoff then scheduled a match between the two for the World Heavyweight Championship at Unforgiven. On the August 30 episode of Raw, Eugene defeated Triple H in a singles match after Orton interfered and performed an RKO on Triple H. On the September 6 episode of Raw, Orton defeated Kane in a Steel Cage match by escaping the cage. Shortly after the match ended, Ric Flair and Batista came out and, along with Triple H, began attacking Orton. In an interview with the Daily Star in 2006, Orton revealed that WWE chairman, Vince McMahon, came up with the idea of having Orton turn face the day of SummerSlam. According to Orton, transforming into a face was "tough" because "no one bought it".

The second main feud heading into the event was between Kane and Shawn Michaels. This feud began after Bad Blood, when Michaels lost a Hell in a Cell match to Triple H. On the June 14 episode of Raw, Raw commentator Jim Ross tried making amends between Michaels and Triple H by making them to shake hands. Michaels and Triple H extended their hands to shake, however, Kane came out and attacked Michaels, which resulted in Kane, in storyline, crushing Michaels' throat with a wedged chair. Michaels was then taken out in an ambulance for medical attention. On the June 28 episode of Raw, Ross interviewed Kane and asked him to explain his actions towards Michaels; Kane explained that he was robbed of the World Heavyweight Championship at Bad Blood against Chris Benoit, as Michaels got in his way, which angered him. On the August 30 episode of Raw, Kane revealed that Eric Bischoff's wedding gift to him and Lita, who married on the August 23 episode of Raw, was to name any match he wanted at Unforgiven. Lita then informed Kane that Bischoff's present was for both of them, where they were able to pick Kane's opponent for Unforgiven, which resulted in Michaels being picked. Prior to the match, Kane revealed that it had become a no disqualification match.

The third main feud heading into the event was between Chris Jericho and Christian over the vacant WWE Intercontinental Championship. On the September 6 episode of Raw, Eric Bischoff stripped Edge of the Intercontinental Championship, after Edge suffered a legitimate groin injury. Christian interrupted Bischoff and stated that all his peeps would riot the streets if Bischoff did not award him the vacant championship. Jericho suggested that he and Christian wrestle in a match later that night over the vacant championship. Bischoff, however, scheduled a Ladder match at Unforgiven between Christian and Jericho.

== Event ==
Other on-screen personnel
Role:	Name:
English commentators	Jim Ross
English commentators	Jerry Lawler
Spanish commentators	Carlos Cabrera
Spanish commentators	Hugo Savinovich
Interviewers	Jonathan Coachman
Interviewers	Todd Grisham
Ring announcer	Lilian Garcia
Referees	Mike Chioda
Referees	Chad Patton
Referees	Jack Doan
Referees	Earl Hebner

Before the event aired live on pay-per-view, Maven defeated Rodney Mack in a match during Sunday Night Heat.

=== Preliminary matches ===
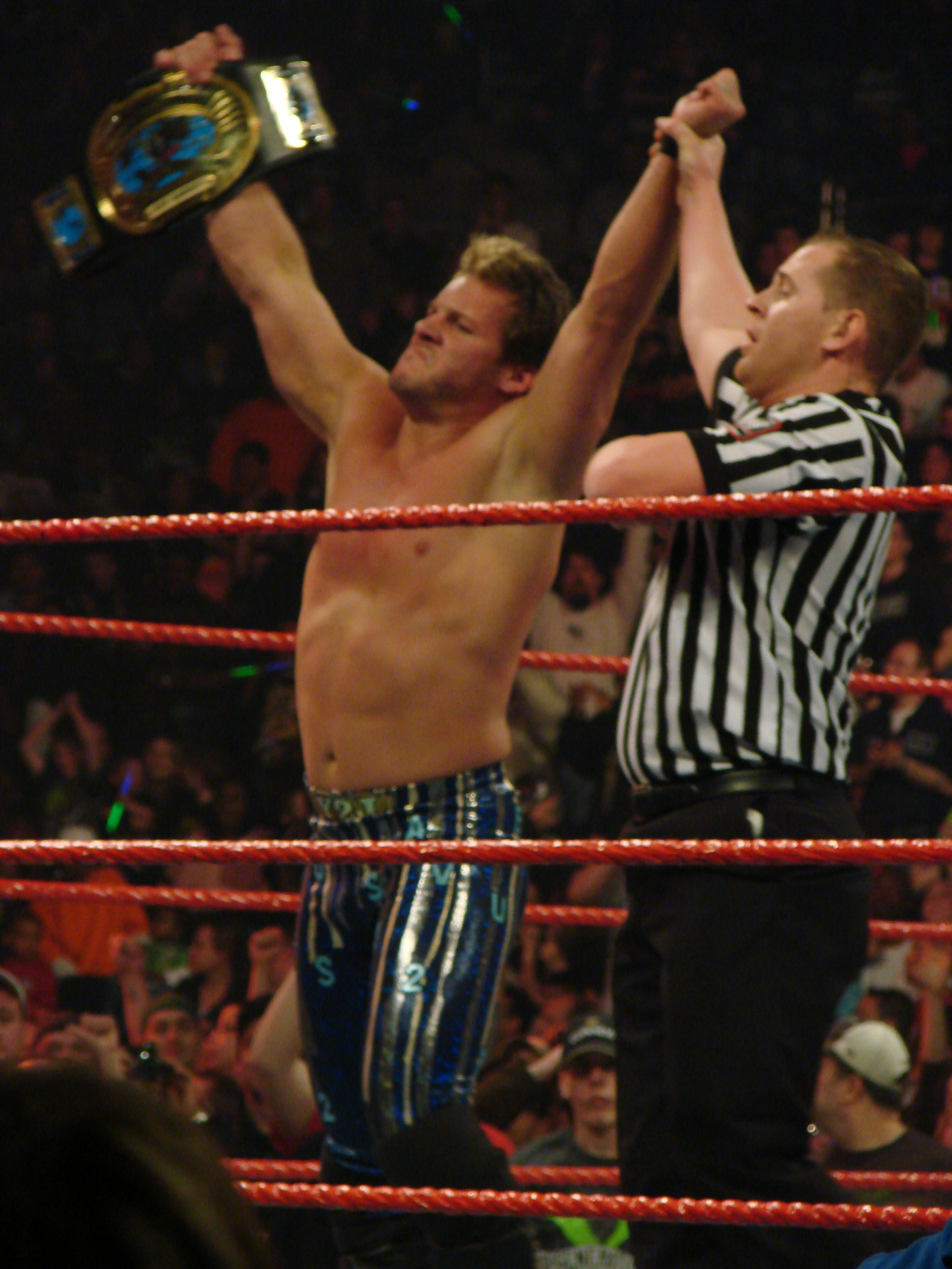
Chris Jericho defeated Christian in a Ladder match to win the vacant Intercontinental Championship

The first match of the event was the tag team encounter of Chris Benoit and William Regal against the team of Evolution (Ric Flair and Batista). The match started off with Batista and Chris Benoit, who brawled back and forth until Flair was tagged in. Flair and Benoit exchanged knife edge chops. Batista and Regal then sparred, but Batista was able to gain control over Regal, until Benoit and Flair tagged in to the match. Benoit and Flair spar back and forth, until Flair applied the Figure four lock only for Benoit to reverse it into the Crippler Crossface, in which Flair submitted to, giving the win to Benoit and Regal.

The next match was the encounter of Victoria and Trish Stratus (with Tyson Tomko) for the WWE Women's Championship. Victoria gained control over Stratus early into the match, however, Stratus gained control after Tomko interfered on her behalf. After Stratus gained the advantage, she performed a Stratusfaction on Victoria and got a successful pinfall, thus Stratus retained the Women's Championship. After the match, Tomko tried to attack Victoria, until she was saved by an unknown man in a dress. Tomko then challenged the mystery superstar into a match.

The third match was between Tyson Tomko and Stevie Richards, dressed in women's clothing as the "Mystery Woman". Tomko quickly gained the advantage after stripping off all of the clothes on Richards, leaving Richards wearing just a pair of women's underwear. Tomko continued his attack on Richards by delivering a swinging neckbreaker and winning the match via pinfall.

The fourth match was for the vacant WWE Intercontinental Championship between Christian and Chris Jericho in a Ladder match. The two superstars brawled early into the match, but they then retrieved ladders and used them to their advantage. Christian was then able to gain control over the match after he performed a running enziguri onto Jericho. The two superstars then continued in a back and forth match, until Jericho applied the Walls of Jericho on Christian, on the top of the ladder, which caused Christian to fall down. Jericho failed to retrieve the title on the first attempt, but was able to set up another ladder and successfully retrieved the title on the second attempt, thus Jericho winning the match and the WWE Intercontinental Championship for a record seventh reign at the time.

=== Main event matches ===
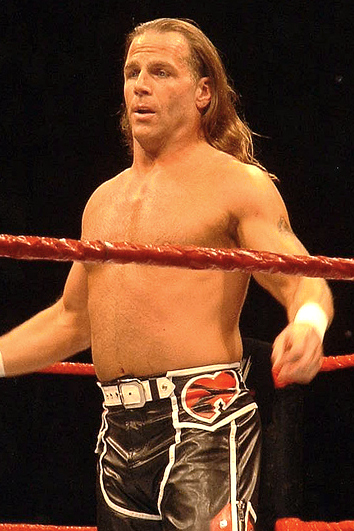
Shawn Michaels, who faced Kane in a No Disqualification match

The next match was a No Disqualification match between Kane, who was accompanied by Lita, and Shawn Michaels. Kane would gain the early advantage as he performed a toss suplex on Michaels through the announce table. Kane would continue to brawl with Michaels at ringside where he hit Michaels with the ringside steel steps, which resulted in Michaels bleeding. As Kane attempted to hit Michaels with a steel chair, Lita would interfere and grab the chair away from Kane. Kane then attempted a chokeslam, but Michaels would counter it with Sweet Chin Music, which gained a successful pinfall.

The following match was for the World Tag Team Championship, in which champions La Résistance (Sylvain Grenier and Robért Conway) defended the title against Tajiri and Rhyno. There was back and forth action between the two teams, as all the superstars were able to participate in the match. Grenier hit Rhyno with a Quebec flag and managed to pin him, thus allowing La Resistance to win the match and retain the World Tag Team Championship.

The main event was between Randy Orton and Triple H for the World Heavyweight Championship. Both Orton and Triple H managed to get the upper hand in the match. During the match, Ric Flair and Batista interfered on behalf of Triple H, as they attacked Orton while the referee was knocked out. Jonathan Coachman also took part in the match as he ran down with a referee shirt and tried to act as a guest referee. Orton managed to get the upper hand over Flair, Batista and Coachman as he delivered an RKO on all of them. Triple H, however, managed to hit Orton with a steel chair, which proceeded with a Pedigree onto the same chair. Batista then rolled the referee into the ring, as Triple H covered Orton for the win via pinfall and score his 9th world championship.

== Aftermath ==
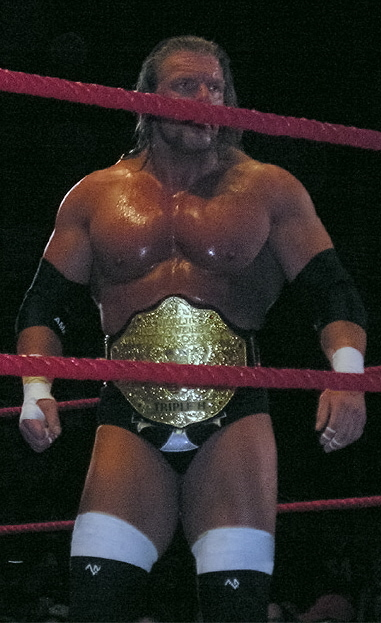
Triple H defeated Randy Orton to win the World Heavyweight Championship at Unforgiven

Following Unforgiven, Triple H had a celebration thrown in his honor, complete with six women, confetti, streamers and a giant cake. Randy Orton, however, sought revenge, as he attacked all three Evolution members, as he came out of the giant cake, which was placed in the center of the ring, and humiliated the group. Orton was however ineligible to face Triple H at Taboo Tuesday for the World Heavyweight Championship, as he was unable to win a match against Batista, which would have given Orton a championship match. On the October 4, 2004 edition of Raw, three candidates were named as potential contenders for Triple H's World Heavyweight Championship at Taboo Tuesday; Chris Benoit and Edge were revealed as two of the candidates. Shawn Michaels, however, competed in a qualifying match, which it saw him defeat Christian, to become the third candidate. On the October 18 edition of Raw, a Triple Threat match was scheduled between Michaels, Benoit and Edge, which Edge won after he pinned Benoit by using the ropes for leverage. During the match, Michaels injured his knee, and it was later revealed that he tore his meniscus. At Taboo Tuesday, Michaels won the fans vote and faced Triple H for the World Heavyweight Championship, however, Michaels was unable to win the match after Edge interfered and speared Michaels, allowing Triple H to pin him.

Randy Orton began a feud with Ric Flair, after Flair was the one responsible for making Orton lose the match against Batista. Orton commented on every accomplishment that Flair had made and criticized him for calling Triple H the greatest wrestler of all. Flair retaliated to Orton's comments, stating that individuals like Shawn Michaels and Mick Foley, who Orton had previously feuded with, were not legends, therefore Orton was not a Legend Killer. Flair also stated that he and Orton would have a match at Taboo Tuesday and the fans would have the opportunity to choose what type of match they face in. At Taboo Tuesday, Orton and Flair met in a Steel Cage match, which was the fans selection. Orton won the match after delivering an RKO to Flair. After the match, Flair shook Orton's hand.

At Taboo Tuesday, Chris Jericho lost the Intercontinental Championship to Shelton Benjamin via pinfall. Benjamin won the vote to face Jericho; he also was voted over Batista, Jonathan Coachman, Christian, Rhyno, Maven, William Regal, The Hurricane, Tyson Tomko, Tajiri, Steven Richards, Val Venis, Rosey, Chuck Palumbo, and Rodney Mack.

On the October 11, 2004 edition of Raw, La Résistance had to defend the World Tag Team Championship in a match with Eugene and William Regal. Regal hit Sylvain Grenier with a pair of brass knuckles and pinned him to win the World Tag Team title. Eric Bischoff, however, restarted the match. The match resulted in La Résistance retaining the title, after Robért Conway jabbed Regal in the side with a flagpole. Bischoff informed La Résistance that at Taboo Tuesday they were scheduled to defend the World Tag Team title against the two individuals who were not chosen to face Triple H for the World title. Shawn Michaels won the fans choice, which gave Edge and Chris Benoit a World Tag Team title match. Edge, however, abandoned Benoit during the match, which forced Benoit to wrestle both members of La Résistance by himself. Despite this, Benoit managed to force Conway to submit to the Crippler Crossface to win the World Tag Team Championship.

== Results ==
No.	Results	Stipulations	Times
1^{H}	Maven defeated Rodney Mack (with Jazz)	Singles match	4:42
2	Chris Benoit and William Regal defeated Evolution (Ric Flair and Batista)	Tag team match	15:07
3	Trish Stratus (c) (with Tyson Tomko) defeated Victoria	Singles match for the WWE Women's Championship	8:21
4	Tyson Tomko defeated Steven Richards	Singles match	6:24
5	Chris Jericho defeated Christian	Ladder match for the vacant WWE Intercontinental Championship	22:29
6	Shawn Michaels defeated Kane (with Lita)	No Disqualification match	18:02
7	La Résistance (Sylvain Grenier and Robért Conway) (c) defeated Tajiri and Rhyno	Tag team match for the World Tag Team Championship	9:40
8	Triple H defeated Randy Orton (c)	Singles match for the World Heavyweight Championship	24:47
(c) / – the champion(s) heading into the match; H / – the match was broadcast prior to the pay-per-view on Sunday Night Heat
