= Unforgiven (2003) =

World Wrestling Entertainment pay-per-view event

- Promotional poster featuring Kane
- Promotion: World Wrestling Entertainment
- Brand: Raw
- Date: September 21, 2003
- City: Hershey, Pennsylvania
- Venue: Giant Center
- Attendance: 10,347
- Buy rate: 360,000
- Tagline: Face Your Fear

Pay-per-view chronology
← Previous; SummerSlam	Next → No Mercy

Unforgiven chronology
← Previous; 2002	Next → 2004

The 2003 Unforgiven was a professional wrestling pay-per-view (PPV) event produced by World Wrestling Entertainment (WWE). It was the sixth annual Unforgiven and took place on September 21, 2003, at the Giant Center in Hershey, Pennsylvania. It was held exclusively for wrestlers from the promotion's Raw brand division, which made it the first brand-exclusive Unforgiven after the previous year's event also featured wrestlers from SmackDown!.

Nine professional wrestling matches were contested at this event. The main event was Triple H versus Goldberg for the World Heavyweight Championship. Goldberg won the match and the World Heavyweight Championship after pinning Triple H following a spear and a Jackhammer. Two of the predominant matches on the card were a Triple threat match for the WWE Intercontinental Championship between Christian, Chris Jericho and Rob Van Dam, which Christian retained the title by pinning Van Dam after hitting him with the belt, and the other was a Last Man Standing match between Shane McMahon and Kane, which Kane won after Shane failed to answer the referee's ten count. Another primary match on the undercard was Randy Orton versus Shawn Michaels, which Orton won by pinfall after hitting Michaels in the head with a pair of brass knuckles.

== Production ==
=== Background ===
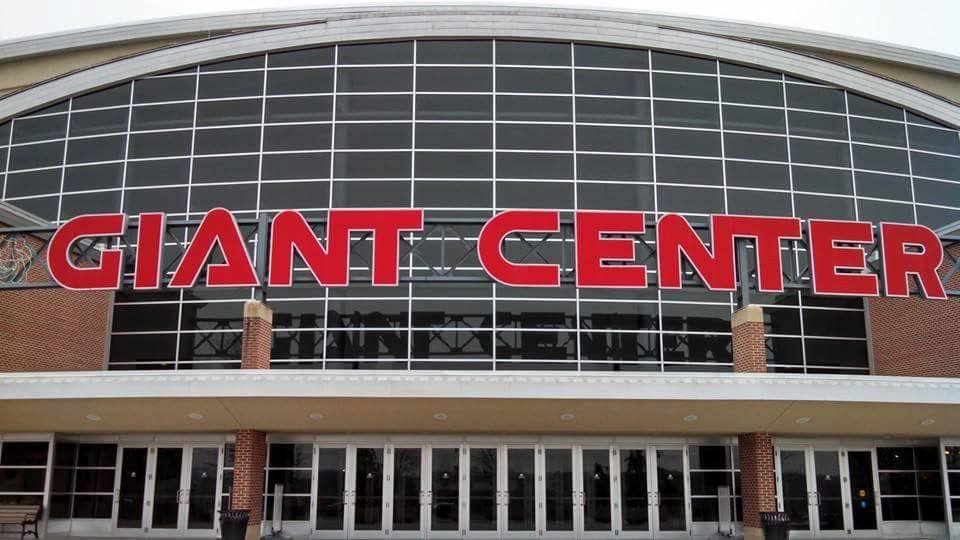
This edition of Unforgiven took place at the Giant Center in Hershey, Pennsylvania.

Unforgiven was an annual professional wrestling pay-per-view (PPV) event first held by World Wrestling Entertainment (WWE) as the 21st In Your House PPV in April 1998. Following the discontinuation of the In Your House series in February 1999, Unforgiven continued as its own PPV event in September that year, becoming WWE's annual September PPV. The sixth event took place on September 21, 2003, at Giant Center in Hershey, Pennsylvania. While the previous year's event featured wrestlers from both the Raw and SmackDown! brands, the 2003 event was held exclusively for Raw, which made it the first brand-exclusive Unforgiven.

=== Storylines ===
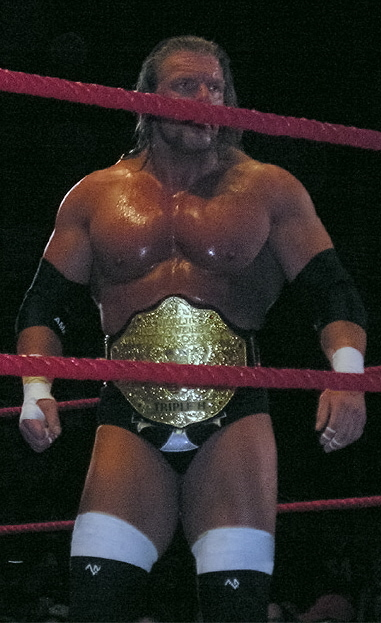
Triple H as World Heavyweight Champion

The event comprised eight matches, including one on the pre-show, that resulted from scripted storylines, where wrestlers portrayed heroes, villains, or less distinguishable characters in scripted events that built tension and culminated in a wrestling match or series of matches. Results were predetermined by WWE's writers on the Raw brand, while storylines were produced on its weekly television show, Raw and its supplementary show Sunday Night Heat.

The main feud heading into Unforgiven was between Triple H and Goldberg over the World Heavyweight Championship. One month prior at SummerSlam, Triple H won an Elimination Chamber match to retain the World Heavyweight Championship by last eliminating Goldberg. After the match ended, Triple H, along with Evolution members Ric Flair and Randy Orton, handcuffed Goldberg to the Chamber and attacked him with a sledgehammer. The next night on Raw, Goldberg challenged Triple H to a match later that night. Triple H declined and said that they would face off at Unforgiven instead. Triple H then added the stipulation that if he won, Goldberg would have to retire from professional wrestling. On the September 1 episode of Raw, Goldberg, Shawn Michaels, and Maven defeated Evolution (Triple H, Orton, and Flair). Towards the end of the match, Orton attacked Goldberg from behind as he was preparing to spear Triple H. Goldberg was able to kick out of the pinfall attempt and hit Orton with a Jackhammer for the win. The next week on Raw, Co-General Manager "Stone Cold" Steve Austin added the stipulation where if Triple H got himself counted out or intentionally disqualified, he would lose the World Heavyweight Championship.

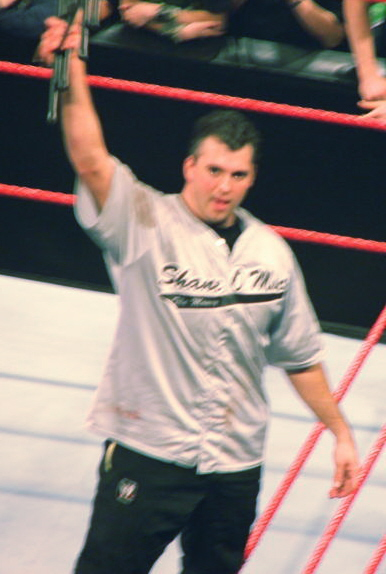
Shane McMahon, who faced Kane in a Last Man Standing match

The other main match on the card was a Last Man Standing match between Shane McMahon and Kane. On the June 23 episode of Raw, Kane was forced to unmask himself after he had lost a Mask vs. Title match for the World Heavyweight Championship to Triple H. Shortly after Kane unmasked himself, Kane turned on and chokeslammed his tag team partner Rob Van Dam. Three weeks later on the July 14 episode of Raw, during an interview between Kane and Jim Ross, Kane set Ross on fire after he thought Ross was mocking him. The following week on Raw, after a match between Kane and Van Dam ended in a no-contest, Linda McMahon came out to try and stop Kane from attacking Van Dam. Kane, however, gave Linda a Tombstone Piledriver on the steel ramp. On the July 28 episode of Raw, Shane made a surprise appearance by attacking Kane for his actions the week before. The next week on Raw, Eric Bischoff defeated McMahon after Kane interfered and gave McMahon a Tombstone Piledriver on the steel ring steps. On August 24 at SummerSlam, Kane defeated Van Dam in a No Holds Barred match, and McMahon defeated Bischoff in a No Disqualification Falls Count Anywhere match. The following night on Raw, during a match between McMahon and Chris Jericho, Kane interfered and performed a chokeslam on McMahon. Shortly afterwards, McMahon superkicked Kane into a dumpster that was on fire and full of gasoline. On the September 8 episode of Raw, Bischoff announced that McMahon and Kane would face each other in a Last Man Standing match at Unforgiven. The next week on Raw, after both men signed a contract for their match at Unforgiven, McMahon gave Kane multiple low blows, followed by a Leap of Faith through an announce table.

One of the main matches on the undercard was between Randy Orton and Shawn Michaels. At Bad Blood, Ric Flair defeated Michaels after Orton interfered and hit Michaels with a steel chair. One month later, on the July 21 episode of Raw, Chris Jericho defeated Michaels in a Singles match. In the match, Orton interfered on Jericho's behalf by executing an RKO on Michaels while the referee was distracted. The following week on Raw, during Jericho's Highlight Reel talk show, Orton claimed that he was becoming a "Legend Killer" and that Michaels was going to be the next legend he would kill. Michaels came out shortly afterwards and the two started brawling. On the September 1 episode of Raw, "Stone Cold" Steve Austin announced that Orton would face off against Michaels at Unforgiven. Two weeks later on the September 15 episode of Raw, Orton told Michaels that he was going to use him as a "stepping stone towards greatness." Michaels responded by slapping Orton and telling him that if he was going to use him as a stepping stone, he had better step hard.

The Divas match set for Unforgiven was a tag team match pitting Trish Stratus and Lita against Molly Holly and Gail Kim. Gail Kim debuted on the June 30 episode of Raw and won the WWE Women's Championship in a battle royal. On the July 28 edition of Raw, Kim lost her title to Molly Holly. After Stratus defeated Holly in a non-title match on the following week, she was attacked in the ring by Holly and Victoria. Kim entered and fought off both Divas; appearing to save Stratus, but she would later attack Stratus herself, turning heel. Two weeks later, Kim aligned with Holly to eliminate Stratus, and the pair continuously attacked Stratus for several weeks. On the September 15 episode of Raw, Lita returned from injury and saved Stratus from being attacked from Holly and Kim, setting up the tag team match for Unforgiven.

== Event ==
Other on-screen personnel
Role:	Name:
English Commentators	Jim Ross
English Commentators	Jerry Lawler
Spanish commentators	Carlos Cabrera
Spanish commentators	Hugo Savinovich
Interviewers	Jonathan Coachman
Interviewers	Terri Runnels
Ring announcer
Ring announcer	Lillian Garcia
Referees	Charles Robinson
Referees	Nick Patrick
Referees	Chad Patton
Referees	Earl Hebner
Referees	Jack Doan

=== Preliminary matches ===
Before the event went live on pay-per-view, Maven defeated Stevie Richards in a match taped for WWE Heat. The first match that aired was a Handicap Tables match between The Dudley Boyz (Bubba Ray Dudley and D-Von Dudley) and Rob Conway and La Resistance (Sylvain Grenier and Rene Dupree) for the World Tag Team Championship. The Dudley Boyz put Dupree though a table with a 3D to win the titles.

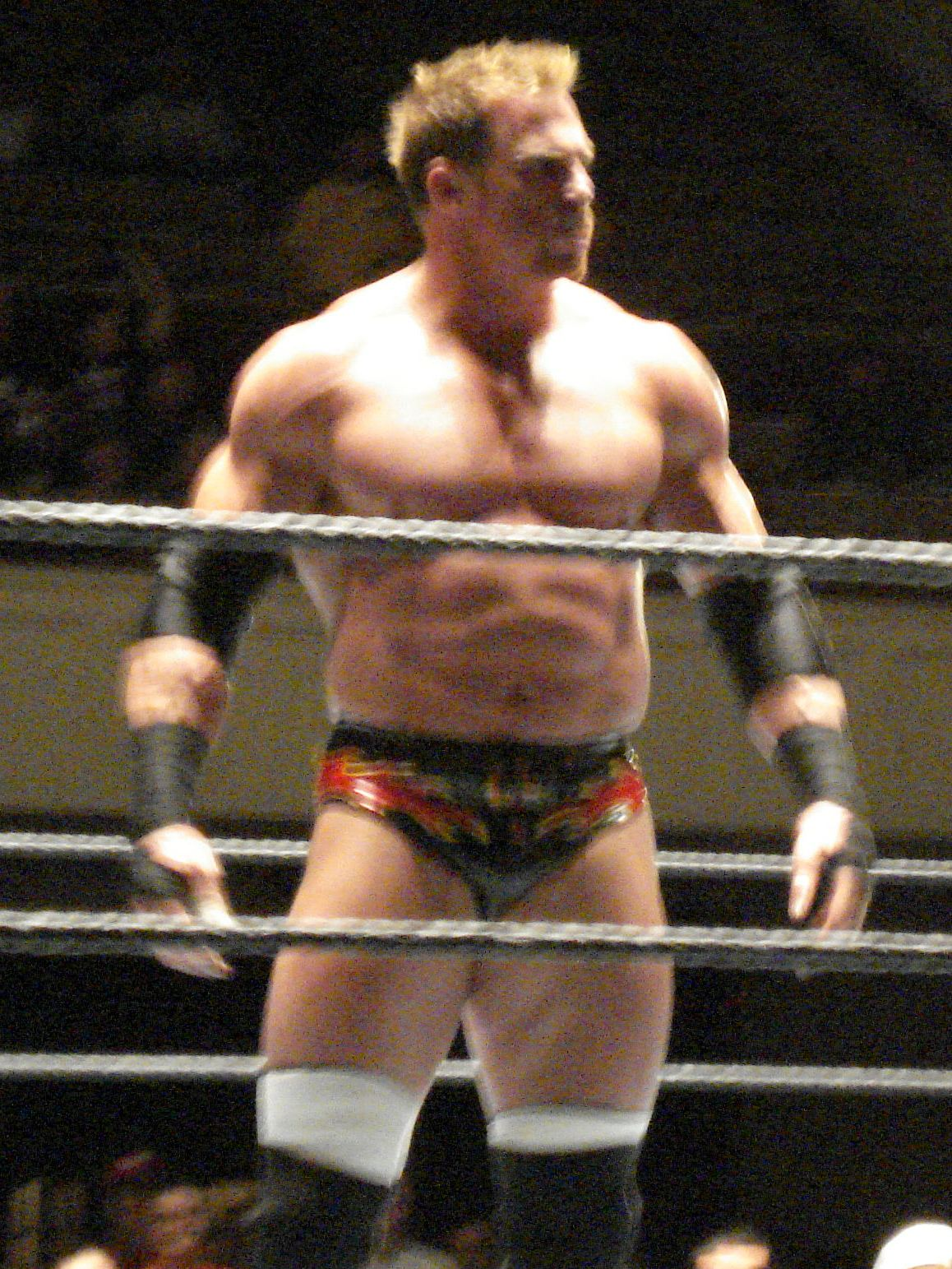
Test faced Scott Steiner

The next match was between Test and Scott Steiner. After Test tried a clothesline, Steiner countered with a fallaway slam for a one count. Later during the match, Test attempted a diving double axe handle but Steiner reversed it into a suplex. In the end, Test attempted to hit Steiner with a chair but Stacy Keibler came inside the ring and took the chair. Keibler tried to hit Test but hit Steiner, allowing Test to execute a running big boot for the pin. Therefore, Steiner became Test's property, as per the pre-match stipulation.

The third match was Shawn Michaels versus Randy Orton. Orton countered Sweet Chin Music into an RKO on Michaels for a near-fall. Michaels executed Sweet Chin Music on Orton for a pin but Ric Flair put Orton's foot on the bottom rope to void the pinfall. Flair passed Orton a pair of brass knuckles, but Michaels executed Sweet Chin Music on Flair. Michaels attempted a back suplex but Orton hit Michaels with the brass knuckles and pinned Michaels to win the match.

Next was a Divas tag team match between the team of Trish Stratus and Lita and the team of Molly Holly and Gail Kim. When the match began, all four Divas fought each other. When the two legal Divas were inside the ring, it was between Lita and Kim. Throughout the match, Lita's team had the advantage over Kim and Holly. In the end, Stratus threw Kim out of the ring, and Lita performed a moonsault on Holly for the pin.

=== Main event matches ===
Next was a Last Man Standing match between Kane and Shane McMahon. Before the match began, McMahon attacked Kane, who was doing his entrance, with a steel chair. As the referee officially called to ring the bell to start the match, Kane pushed McMahon away to block another chair shot. After multiple shots with the chair, McMahon targeted Kane's knee using the ring post. Later, Kane attempted to perform a big boot on McMahon, but he accidentally hit the referee. After back and forth action, Kane attempted a Tombstone Piledriver onto the steel steps on McMahon but McMahon countered into a bulldog and performed a Coast-to-Coast into the steel steps, which were positioned against Kane. In the end, McMahon attempted a Leap of Faith, from the top of the arena on the TitanTron, which was roughly 25 feet tall. but Kane moved and McMahon fell through the floor. Kane won the match when McMahon did not stand up in time to answer the referee's 10 count.

In the next match, Christian, Chris Jericho, and Rob Van Dam fought in a Triple Threat match for the WWE Intercontinental Championship. At the start, Jericho and Christian teamed up on Van Dam. Van Dam reversed Jericho and Christian's offense, performing a double dropkick. During the match, Van Dam performed a double DDT on the two. At the end, Van Dam went for a 5-star frog splash on Christian but when the referee was distracted, Christian retrieved the belt and Van Dam fell onto it. Christian then pinned Van Dam with a roll-up to retain the title.

The seventh match was Al Snow and Jonathan Coachman taking on Jim Ross and Jerry Lawler for the commentator position of Raw. Chris Jericho came out and interfered, allowing Al Snow and Coachman to get the victory.

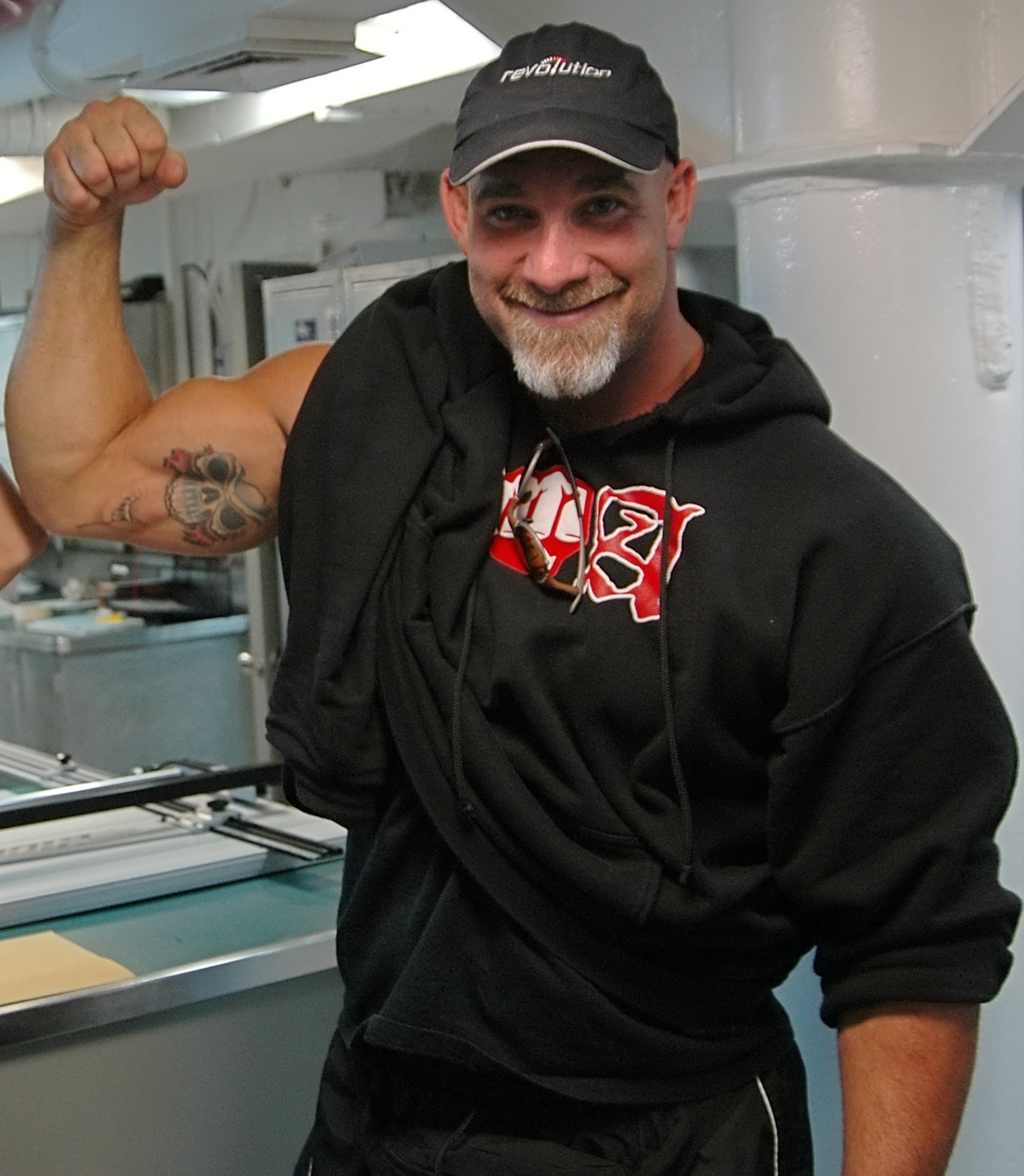
Goldberg, who challenged Triple H for the World Heavyweight Championship

Next was the main event, which saw Triple H defend the World Heavyweight Championship against Goldberg where if Triple H got counted out or disqualified, he would lose the title, but if Goldberg lost, he would be forced to retire. In the end, Goldberg attempted a spear but Triple H countered with a facebreaker knee smash. After Triple H attempted another one, Goldberg countered, kicked Triple H in the stomach, and performed a clothesline. In the end, Goldberg executed a spear and a Jackhammer to win the title.

== Aftermath ==
Following Unforgiven, Triple H offered a $100,000 bounty to anyone who could "take out" Goldberg. The first individual to act on the bounty was Steven Richards. He was unsuccessful, as he was quickly taken out by Goldberg. Others who tried included Mark Henry, Rodney Mack and Tommy Dreamer, but all three were unsuccessful. On the October 20 episode of Raw, Goldberg faced Shawn Michaels in a World Heavyweight title match, after Raw Co-General Manager Eric Bischoff booked the match the week before. During the match, Goldberg and Michaels were down, along with the referee. Batista made a run-in, as he kayfabe attacked Michaels and dragged him out of the ring. He then proceeded to attack Goldberg, which led to Batista inserting a chair on Goldberg's ankle. He then jumped off the second rope onto the chair, kayfabe shattering Goldberg's ankle. Afterwards, Evolution gave the $100,000 bounty to Batista. The following week, Bischoff was set to present Triple H with the World Heavyweight title, after the events that took place the week before, but Co-General Manager "Stone Cold" Steve Austin intervened and announced a title match at Survivor Series between Goldberg and Triple H. On the November 10 episode of Raw, Goldberg and Batista were scheduled in a match, which resulted in a disqualification, after Triple H interfered. Triple H tried to injure Goldberg's knee with a use of a chair and sledgehammer. Goldberg, however, speared Triple H and attacked Batista with the sledgehammer. At Survivor Series, Goldberg retained the title, after he hit Triple H with a spear and Jackhammer for the pinfall. Goldberg would ultimately drop the World Heavyweight Championship back to Triple H at Armageddon the following month.

On the October 20 episode of Raw, Co-General Manager Eric Bischoff proposed that he and Co-General Manager Steve Austin face off at Survivor Series in a traditional 5-on-5 Survivor Series match to determine the future of Raw. The stipulation of the match was that if Austin's team defeated Bischoff's team, Austin could no longer have to be physically provoked before assaulting a Raw Superstar; if Bischoff’s team, however, were victorious, Austin must resign his position as Co-General Manager. Austin promptly accepted the challenge, with Bischoff announcing the first two members of his team were Scott Steiner and Chris Jericho. Later in the night, Booker T was announced as the first member of Austin's Survivor Series team. The following week, Rob Van Dam, and Bubba Ray and D-Von Dudley were named members to join Austin's team. For Team Bischoff, Christian and Mark Henry were announced as members, as well. On the November 3 episode of Raw, both Austin and Bischoff announced their final members to join their respective team; Shawn Michaels accepted Austin's invitation to join his team and Bischoff announced Randy Orton as the last member to join his team. At Survivor Series, Team Bischoff (Steiner, Jericho, Christian, Henry and Orton) defeated Team Austin (Booker T, Van Dam, Bubba Ray, D-Von and Michaels). As a result of Austin's team losing, he lost his position as Co-General Manager of Raw.

On the September 22 episode of Raw, Shane McMahon was hospitalized after the events in his match against Kane at Unforgiven. McMahon sent a "message" to Kane, but before he could finish, Kane appeared in McMahon's hospital room and attacked him. The attack led to McMahon bleeding from his forehead and Kane telling him to "Get Well Soon!". Two weeks later, McMahon interfered in a match between Kane and Rosey, which angered Kane. After the match, Kane ran around rampant backstage looking for McMahon. Kane walked by a semi-truck and saw McMahon, who taunted Kane and jumped into a limousine. Kane broke the limousine's window and got in through the sunroof. McMahon proceeded to get out from the drivers seat and rigged the limousine to crash directly into another truck. After the crash, workers attend to the limousine with a bloody Kane inside. The following week on Raw, McMahon challenged Kane, who was in the hospital recovering from the car crash from the week before, to a match at Survivor Series. As the challenge was made, Kane sprang up and attacked a doctor and a nurse who were attending to him. On the October 27 episode of Raw, McMahon challenged Kane to an Ambulance match, which Kane accepted. At Survivor Series, Kane defeated McMahon after Kane performed a Tombstone Piledriver on him and then throwing McMahon into the ambulance.

This event would be the last WWE pay-per-view event to be held at the Hershey Center until 2024 when the NXT brand division would host Halloween Havoc albeit as a livestreaming event.

== Results ==
No.	Results	Stipulations	Times
1^{H}	Maven defeated Steven Richards (with Victoria)	Singles match	5:13
2	The Dudley Boyz (Bubba Ray and D-Von) defeated Rob Conway and La Résistance (Sylvain Grenier and René Duprée) (c)	Handicap Tables match for the World Tag Team Championship	10:17
3	Test (with Stacy Keibler) defeated Scott Steiner	Singles match Since Test won, he received the services of both Keibler and Steiner. Had Steiner won, he would receive Keibler's services.	6:56
4	Randy Orton (with Ric Flair) defeated Shawn Michaels	Singles match	18:47
5	Trish Stratus and Lita defeated Molly Holly and Gail Kim	Tag team match	6:34
6	Kane defeated Shane McMahon	Last Man Standing match	20:00
7	Christian (c) defeated Chris Jericho and Rob Van Dam	Triple threat match for the WWE Intercontinental Championship	19:03
8	Al Snow and Jonathan Coachman defeated Jerry Lawler and Jim Ross	Tag team match for the right to be the commentators for Raw	8:16
9	Goldberg defeated Triple H (c)	Title vs. Career match for the World Heavyweight Championship; Had Triple H been disqualified or counted out, he would have lost the title.	14:57
(c) / – the champion(s) heading into the match; H / – the match was broadcast prior to the pay-per-view on Sunday Night Heat
