= WWE Unforgiven =

World Wrestling Entertainment pay-per-view event series

- WWE Unforgiven logo (with current WWE logo)
- Promotion: World Wrestling Entertainment
- Brands: Raw (2002–2008); SmackDown (2002, 2007–2008); ECW (2007–2008)
- Other name: Unforgiven: In Your House
- First event: Unforgiven: In Your House
- Last event: Unforgiven (2008)

WWE Unforgiven was an annual professional wrestling pay-per-view (PPV) event produced by World Wrestling Entertainment (WWE), a Connecticut-based professional wrestling promotion. It was first held as the 21st In Your House PPV in April 1998. Unforgiven returned as its own PPV in September 1999 and continued as the annual September PPV until the final event in 2008. From its first event up through the 2001 event, the PPV was held when the promotion was still called the World Wrestling Federation (WWF).

Unforgiven: In Your House was notable for featuring the first Inferno match, as well as the first evening gown match. After WWE introduced the brand extension in 2002, Unforgiven from 2003 to 2006 was held exclusively for the Raw brand. Following WrestleMania 23 in April 2007, brand-exclusive PPVs were discontinued, thus the 2007 and 2008 events also featured the SmackDown and ECW brands. In 2009, Unforgiven was discontinued and replaced by Breaking Point.

== History ==
Unforgiven was first held as an In Your House pay-per-view (PPV) event. In Your House was a series of monthly PPVs first produced by the World Wrestling Federation (WWF, now WWE) in May 1995. They aired when the promotion was not holding one of its major PPVs and were sold at a lower cost. Unforgiven: In Your House was the 21st In Your House event and took place on April 26, 1998, at the Greensboro Coliseum Complex in Greensboro, North Carolina. This inaugural Unforgiven event was notable for introducing the Inferno match, as well as the first evening gown match.

After the In Your House branding was retired following February 1999's St. Valentine's Day Massacre: In Your House, Unforgiven branched off as its own PPV that September. Unforgiven then continued as the promotion's annual September PPV until 2008. After the 2008 event, Unforgiven was discontinued and replaced by Breaking Point in 2009.

In May 2002, the WWF was renamed to World Wrestling Entertainment (WWE) as a result of a lawsuit from the World Wildlife Fund over the "WWF" initialism. Also around this time, the promotion held a draft that split its roster into two distinctive brands of wrestling, Raw and SmackDown!, where wrestlers exclusively performed—a third brand, ECW, was added in 2006. To coincide with the brand extension, Unforgiven was held exclusively for wrestlers of the Raw brand from 2003 to 2006. Following WrestleMania 23 in April 2007, WWE discontinued brand-exclusive PPVs, thus the 2007 and 2008 events featured wrestlers from the Raw, SmackDown, and ECW brands.

== Events ==
Raw-branded event

#	Event	Date	City	Venue	Main event	Ref.
1	Unforgiven: In Your House	April 26, 1998	Greensboro, North Carolina	Greensboro Coliseum Complex	Stone Cold Steve Austin (c) vs. Dude Love for the WWF World Heavyweight Championship	
2	Unforgiven (1999)	September 26, 1999	Charlotte, North Carolina	Charlotte Coliseum	Triple H vs. The Rock vs. Kane vs. Mankind vs. Big Show vs. The British Bulldog in a Six-Pack Challenge for the vacant WWF Championship with Stone Cold Steve Austin as the special guest enforcer	
3	Unforgiven (2000)	September 24, 2000	Philadelphia, Pennsylvania	First Union Center	The Rock (c) vs. Chris Benoit vs. The Undertaker vs. Kane in a fatal four-way match for the WWF Championship	
4	Unforgiven (2001)	September 23, 2001	Pittsburgh, Pennsylvania	Mellon Arena	Stone Cold Steve Austin (c) vs. Kurt Angle for the WWF Championship	
5	Unforgiven (2002)	September 22, 2002	Los Angeles, California	Staples Center	Brock Lesnar (c) vs. The Undertaker for the WWE Championship	
6	Unforgiven (2003)	September 21, 2003	Hershey, Pennsylvania	Giant Center	Triple H (c) vs. Goldberg in a Title vs. Career match for the World Heavyweight Championship	
7	Unforgiven (2004)	September 12, 2004	Portland, Oregon	Rose Garden Arena	Randy Orton (c) vs. Triple H for the World Heavyweight Championship	
8	Unforgiven (2005)	September 18, 2005	Oklahoma City, Oklahoma	Ford Center	John Cena (c) vs. Kurt Angle for the WWE Championship	
9	Unforgiven (2006)	September 17, 2006	Toronto, Ontario, Canada	Air Canada Centre	Edge (c) vs. John Cena in a Last Chance Tables, Ladders, and Chairs match for the WWE Championship	
10	Unforgiven (2007)	September 16, 2007	Memphis, Tennessee	FedExForum	The Undertaker vs. Mark Henry	
11	Unforgiven (2008)	September 7, 2008	Cleveland, Ohio	Quicken Loans Arena	Chris Jericho vs. Batista vs. Kane vs. John "Bradshaw" Layfield vs. Rey Mysterio in a Championship Scramble for the vacant World Heavyweight Championship	
(c) – refers to the champion(s) heading into the match

== See also ==
- List of WWE pay-per-view events
