= Unforgiven: In Your House =

1998 World Wrestling Federation pay-per-view event

- Promotional poster featuring The Undertaker
- Promotion: World Wrestling Federation
- Date: April 26, 1998
- City: Greensboro, North Carolina
- Venue: Greensboro Coliseum
- Attendance: 21,427
- Buy rate: 300,000

Pay-per-view chronology
← Previous; WrestleMania XIV	Next → Over the Edge: In Your House

In Your House chronology
← Previous; No Way Out of Texas	Next → Over the Edge

Unforgiven chronology
← Previous; First	Next → 1999

Unforgiven: In Your House was a 1998 professional wrestling pay-per-view (PPV) event produced by the World Wrestling Federation (WWF, renamed WWE in 2002). It was the 21st In Your House, and inaugural Unforgiven, and took place on April 26, 1998, at the Greensboro Coliseum in Greensboro, North Carolina. This was the WWF's first PPV event that used the "scratch" logo for promotional work, which had first appeared on the ring apron at WrestleMania XIV. This event saw the first Inferno match and WWF's first evening gown match.

Seven matches were contested at the event. In the main event, Dude Love defeated "Stone Cold" Steve Austin by disqualification in a match for the WWF Championship, but Austin retained as titles do not change hands by disqualification unless stipulated. Additionally, due to a partnership with the National Wrestling Alliance (NWA), the event saw a defense of the NWA World Tag Team Championship where The Midnight Express (Bodacious Bart and Bombastic Bob) defeated The Rock 'n' Roll Express (Ricky Morton and Robert Gibson) to retain.

This was one of the In Your House events which later became the title of an annual PPV, replacing the method at the time of making new names for all events aside from the "Big Five" (Royal Rumble, WrestleMania, King of the Ring, SummerSlam, and Survivor Series). Unforgiven returned in September 1999, becoming the promotion's annual September PPV until its final event in 2008.

== Production ==
=== Background ===
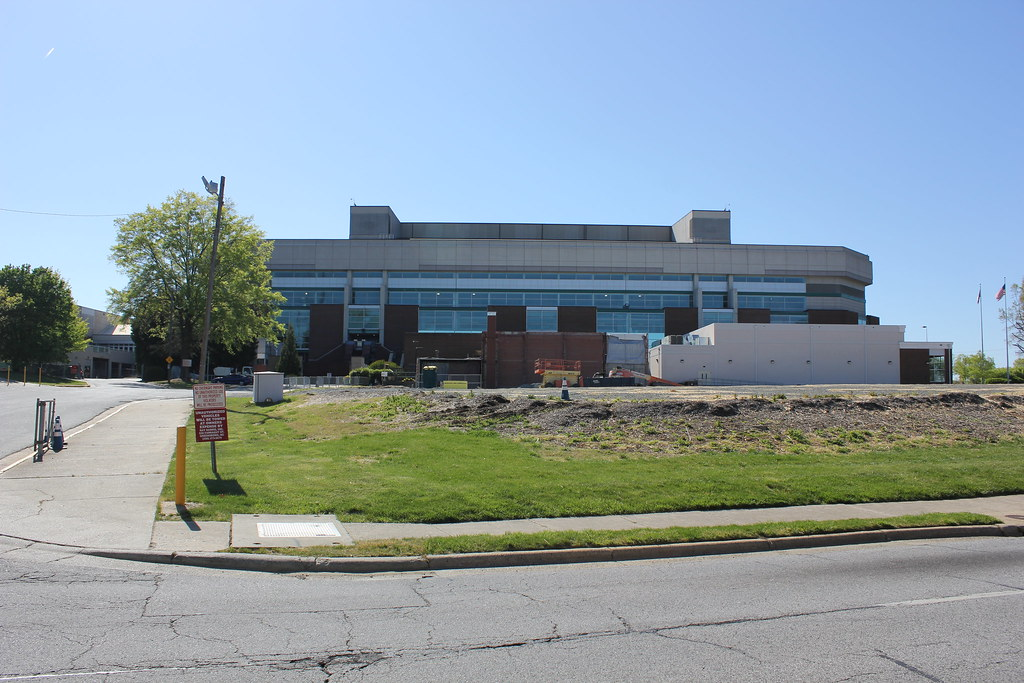
The 21st In Your House was held at the Greensboro Coliseum in Greensboro, North Carolina.

In Your House was a series of monthly professional wrestling pay-per-view (PPV) events first produced by the World Wrestling Federation (WWF, renamed WWE in 2002) in May 1995. They aired when the promotion was not holding one of its then-five major PPVs (WrestleMania, King of the Ring, SummerSlam, Survivor Series, and Royal Rumble) and were sold at a lower cost. The 21st In Your House, titled Unforgiven: In Your House, was scheduled for April 26, 1998, at the Greensboro Coliseum in Greensboro, North Carolina.

=== Storylines ===
For months, Nation of Domination leader Faarooq had felt that his leadership had been compromised by the growing ego of The Rock. At WrestleMania XIV, as Rock was tapping out to Ken Shamrock's ankle lock submission, rather than save him, Faarooq merely laughed as The Rock ostensibly lost his Intercontinental Championship (the decision was soon reversed). The following night on Raw is War, Rock promised to Faarooq that in their tag match against Shamrock and Steve Blackman, the Nation of Domination would "find a new strength". The new strength turned out to be a double cross, as Rocky left the match, making it a de facto handicap match which Faarooq lost. After the match, Faarooq demanded that The Rock return, so they could face each other man-to-man. But when Rock came back to the ring, the rest of the Nation members turned on Faarooq, and The Rock took leadership of the newly named Nation. The next week, as Faarooq arrived at the arena, he was met with a beating in the parking lot by all the Nation members, which they also filmed. Ken Shamrock, meanwhile, was in the midst of forming a tag team with Steve Blackman based on their martial arts backgrounds; however, he still wanted his hands on the Intercontinental Champion.

As the only Hart family member left after the Montreal Screwjob, Owen Hart found himself in a bitter feud with D-Generation X and, more specifically, Triple H. Hart wanted Helmsley's European title after Shawn Michaels laid down during a match, in order to give the title to Triple H as a Christmas present. Hart eventually persuaded Helmsley into a match, although it turned out to be a ruse with The Artist Formerly Known as Goldust playing the part of Triple H; Hart's win was upheld, and he became champion anyway. Triple H would win the title back with the help of Chyna exploiting Owen's injured ankle. Their rematch at WrestleMania XIV would see Commissioner Sgt. Slaughter be handcuffed to Chyna in a bid to prevent her from interfering. However, Chyna managed to get involved regardless and Hart lost the match after a low blow. The decision was then made for a rematch to be held at Unforgiven, with Chyna restrained in a small cage suspended from the ground.

Since the beginning of the year, Jim Cornette had long been on a campaign to "return tradition" to the WWF; in doing so, Cornette assembled a National Wrestling Alliance faction. The NWA Tag Team Champions The Rock 'n' Roll Express were part of this faction until two successive losses to The Headbangers saw Jim Cornette turn on them and bring in The New Midnight Express who would eventually score a win over the Headbangers and take the titles. The Rock 'n' Roll Express, however, still wanted revenge for their assault and Cornette's double-cross.

Marc Mero's jealousy over the attention his wife and valet, Sable, gained from the crowd had been escalating for months. In an effort to mock her and to deliberately annoy the audience, Mero would send Sable from ringside during his matches, and eventually would invite out The Artist Formerly Known as Goldust, dressed up as Sable, to accompany him; this would lead to a short-lived tag team between the two. The team would soon come undone, however, as Goldust's valet Luna Vachon took exception to Sable. After Sable dominated Vachon in a mixed-tag match at WrestleMania XIV, Vachon demanded a one-on-one rematch with Sable, which was instantly accepted. The stipulation was later revealed to be an Evening Gown match, in order for Vachon to humiliate Sable, which she initially did by having Goldust dress up again as Sable and strip him. Sable appeared, however, and assaulted Vachon, with the latter having to flee.

After a series of successive losses, the Legion of Doom seemed to split up after brawling in the ring following a loss at the hands of the New Age Outlaws on the February 24 episode of Raw is War. The team would return over a month later as the surprise entrants of WrestleMania's opening fifteen tag team battle royal with a revamped image as "LOD 2000", sporting new ring attire and a new manager, Sunny. By winning the match, LOD 2000 became the number one contenders for the WWF Tag Team Championships and were initially set to face the winners of the WrestleMania "Dumpster Match", Cactus Jack and Chainsaw Charlie. However, a technicality saw the titles being stripped from the team and on the March 30 edition of Raw is War, the Outlaws would win the titles back thanks to some interference from their new D-Generation X stablemates, meaning LOD 2000 would have to once again face their old rivals for the titles.

Since Kane's debut in the WWF, interrupting The Undertaker's match and ruining his chances of beating Shawn Michaels at Badd Blood: In Your House, Paul Bearer had ordered Kane to be constant trouble to his half-brother, who in turn, had refused to fight Kane. Things changed though, during a casket match at the Royal Rumble when Kane interfered again, chokeslamming The Undertaker into the casket, before padlocking it shut and setting it ablaze, seemingly destroying The Undertaker. After Undertaker returned just before WrestleMania, he claimed to have gone to the afterlife and spoken to his parents and could now justify fighting his own brother. Despite winning the match, it took three tombstone piledrivers to do the job. Kane recovered afterwards, and tombstoned his brother onto a chair. Paul Bearer challenged The Undertaker again soon after on Raw, to a match surrounded by fire where the loser would be the first man to be set ablaze. The following week, Kane and Bearer were shown at the graves of Undertaker's parents, smashing the headstones and setting it on fire. The week before the event, Undertaker went to the crypt of his parents only to find their coffins gone; they reappeared in the arena under the auspices of Kane and Bearer, who then set one of them on fire and when Undertaker tried to stop them, Kane chokeslammed him into the other coffin.

A couple of weeks before WrestleMania, Vince McMahon revealed in an interview by Kevin Kelly that the thought of "Stone Cold" Steve Austin winning the WWF Championship would be a "public relations nightmare". Following the event, McMahon had Austin incarcerated after being assaulted in the ring. He later brought out a seemingly changed Austin, formed in his own corporate image with a suit. This turned out to be a ruse though, with Austin quickly stripping off into his normal attire and stunning McMahon. On the April 13th edition of Raw is War, Austin offered McMahon the choice of either fighting him in the ring or being attacked backstage; McMahon took the offer of the match, but once in the ring, called on the boast that Austin had made, the boast being that Austin could defeat McMahon with one hand tied behind his back. Before the match could get underway though, Mick Foley returned in his "Dude Love" persona and threatened to attack McMahon, before then giving the mandible claw to Austin. The week before the event, McMahon commentated the final match, Dude Love versus Steve Blackman, and promised not only to be at ringside during Unforgiven, but also predicting that a "catastrophic event" would occur. Austin commented on this saying Vince McMahon has only sat at ringside one other time, and that was at Survivor Series when someone else got screwed out of the title. The match ended in controversy as well, when the timekeeper suddenly rang the bell in the middle of a submission hold, declaring Dude Love the winner, much to the fury of Blackman.

== Event ==
Other on-screen personnel
Role:	Name:
English commentators	Jim Ross
English commentators	Jerry Lawler
Spanish commentators	Carlos Cabrera
Spanish commentators	Hugo Savinovich
Interviewer	Michael Cole
Ring announcer	Howard Finkel
Referees	Earl Hebner
Referees	Jim Korderas
Referees	Jack Doan
Referees	Mike Chioda

The event began with a six-man tag team match, pitting The Nation against the team of Faarooq, Ken Shamrock, and Steve Blackman. D'Lo Brown began the match with a snap suplex on Blackman, but a reversal allowed Blackman to take control and soon things heated up when Faarooq was tagged in, scoop slamming Brown and then untying his belt to whip Brown with it, while The Rock complained to the referee preventing him from seeing the illegal weapon. The Nation then took control between the slow, heavy style of Mark Henry, the quick pace of The Rock, and Brown's high-flying maneuvers to dominate Blackman, with The Rock eventually landing the People's Elbow. The match would then turn after Brown missed a moonsault, allowing for Blackman to tag in Faarooq, taking down the newly tagged Rock and an interfering Henry, when all six men came in the ring. The non-legal men soon brawled out of the ring leaving the legal men to complete the match after Faarooq reversed a DDT attempt into his Dominator to win the match.

Immediately following the opening match, "Stone Cold" Steve Austin came to the ring, bringing the official timekeeper with him. Austin preceding to threaten the timekeeper, telling him to call the match right down the middle, regardless of what Vince McMahon's orders to him were.

Before the European Title match, a cage was lowered from the ceiling, the stipulation dictating that Chyna was to be locked inside of it to prevent any interference. After both competitors came to the ring, Commissioner Sgt. Slaughter came to ringside to oversee Chyna being caged. Once she was locked in, with Triple H still paying attention to her, Owen Hart attacked Triple H from behind and fought him up the ramp and back down, throwing him into the cage and then suplexing him on the walkway, taunting him with an ironic crotch chop before rolling him into the ring for the match to be officially started. The two were not in the ring long though, as Hart immediately clotheslined the champion out again, and watched Chyna's cage ascend. Triple H eventually managed to fight back after much dominance from Hart, using a flying knee while Hart was running towards him. Helmsley then slowed the match down after a suplex with an inverted backbreaking sleeper hold and, despite some fight back from Hart, Triple H mostly managed to keep subdue him with a variety of holds. Hart reversed the second time Helmsley applied the backbreaker sleeper by bridging into a standing position, and then performing a backflip to allow a belly to back suplex. It was at this point that Chyna's attempts to break free from the cage, that had been going on all match, came to fruition with the steel bars bending under her hold. While Hart continued to throw Triple H around, Chyna gradually climbed out of the cage, but was too far to drop down. The cage suddenly lowered, as Road Dogg was revealed to be manning the controls, allowing Chyna to drop off and jump to the apron. This distraction caused Hart to let go of the Sharpshooter on Helmsley in order to push her to the ground. Slaughter then appeared with a number of referees to dispatch Chyna; because of this, however, there was no one to count the pinfall when Hart executed his opponent's own finisher, The Pedigree. In the middle of all the chaos, X-Pac stormed the ring, attacking Hart with a fire extinguisher, allowing Triple H to steal the win and retain the title.

An unscheduled NWA match between The New Midnight Express and The Rock 'n' Roll Express began with Robert Gibson circling Bodacious Bart and after some grapple take downs, both teams changed partners. Ricky Morton ducked under a kick from Bombastic Bob, with Bob accidentally striking Bart. The same thing would happen again with Morton hung on the ropes, Gibson was pulled into the ring and Bob Irish whipped him into Morton, only for it to be reversed and Morton to step away, allowing Bob to run into Bart and push him off the ring apron. Despite some in-fighting, the match soon continued with an abdominal stretch on Morton being aided with Bart holding onto Bob's hand. As the referee saw it, Jim Cornette came into the ring to complain to referee Tim White at which point a fight almost broke out between the two, the wrestlers breaking them apart. After both Midnight members dominated Morton, Gibson's tag managed to turn things around with the Rock 'n' Roll Express performing a simultaneous turnbuckle ten-punch and Irish whipping the Midnighters into each other. The pin count was almost broken up by Jim Cornette, but Gibson released the pin and Cornette bodysplashed Bob. It amounted to little though, as Bart quickly ran into a bulldog on Gibson and pinned him before Morton could break up the fall.

The first ever WWF evening gown match started with both women pulling at each other's clothes and hair, Sable ripping off Luna Vachon's two gloves before taking a kick to the stomach and a choke in the corner. As the referee tried to drag Vachon away from the corner, she grabbed onto Sable and unwittingly pulled off her skirt. Having been pulled apart, Sable speared Vachon and began to punch her on the ground and into the turnbuckle. Marc Mero, who had refused to stand in Sable's corner out of embarrassment, appeared to talk to his wife, but this distraction allowed Vachon to yank Sable's top away from behind and win the match. Despite the match being over, Sable quickly assaulted Vachon and powerbombed her in the ring, before pulling off her gown as Vachon tried to escape. The pair continued their brawl, going underneath the ring for a short while until Sable reappeared and climbed back into the ring holding Vachon's underwear, leaving Dustin Rhodes to take her backstage wrapped in his ring coat.

The New Age Outlaws came out ostensibly accompanied by Dean Smith, which turned out to be merely a blow up doll. A large amount of ducking clotheslines prevented either competitor from taking an early advantage, with Animal also reversing a double-team move from both Outlaws. Animal then tagged in Hawk, who dominated both Road Dogg and then Billy Gunn through various slams and running strikes. The Outlaws began to control the match after Gunn struck Animal's leg as LOD 2000 tried to finish Road Dogg with a Doomsday Device. Animal's knee became a target as both Outlaws frequently tagged, keeping their opponent mostly on the ground and focusing moves on the knee. After a collision that saw both Road Dogg and Animal grounded, both wrestlers tagged in their respective partners and Hawk came in with a flurry of clotheslines. But, as he pinned Road Dogg from a top rope splash, the referee had to help Animal back to his corner. This allowed Gunn to attack Hawk with the title belt. Hawk kicked out though, and with the referee again distracted, Hawk was held up to be struck again with the belt but ducked, leaving Road Dogg to strike Gunn and as Road Dogg looked on in shock, Hawk used a German suplex pin. However, the Outlaws were announced as winners as the referee was actually counting Hawk, whose shoulders were also on the mat under Road Dogg's legs. Hawk then clotheslined the referee, and LOD attacked the referee with a Doomsday Device.

Tennessee Lee then appeared to introduce Sawyer Brown who performed 'backing vocals', to their song "Some Girls Do" with Jeff Jarrett. After the song finished, Steve Blackman jumped on the band stage and assaulted Jarrett; Lee saved his client with a guitar shot and Jarrett kept Blackman down with a figure four leg lock.

The first WWF Inferno Match then started with The Undertaker kicking Kane into the turnbuckle and dragging his hand to the flames but Kane turned things around and kicked The Undertaker into the turnbuckle. Undertaker quickly grabbed Kane's hand and threw him into the opposing turnbuckle, running into a diving crossbody before twisting Kane's hand and walking the top rope for Old School as the flames shot high. Kane soon fought The Undertaker to the mat, trying to push his face underneath the ropes into the flames, but Undertaker delivered a thumb to his opponent's weak eye. Paul Bearer then threw a chair to Kane which helped him knock Undertaker to the ground, but it did little good as he soon fought back when he was dragged by his hair near the flames. The two continued to fight back and forth, with no obvious dominant wrestler despite a chokeslam from both parties. Undertaker almost set himself on fire when Kane sidestepped a leaping flying clothesline and landed just short of the flames. Kane replied by going to the top rope, but the ropes were shaken underneath him, seeing him fall victim to a superplex. As the two recovered, Undertaker sidestepped a running attack and threw Kane over the top ropes, although he did not catch fire. Kane then began to leave the arena, but was prevented by the returning Vader, who fought Kane back towards the ring where both men were met with an over the top rope suicide dive by The Undertaker. All the while, Paul Bearer had grabbed a steel chair and was walking around to hand it to Kane, only for Undertaker to grab it and kick Bearer away, knocking Kane out with a chair shot. Undertaker then chased Bearer away up to the band stage and put his head through a bass drum, making him bleed. As Undertaker walked back down to the ring, he delivered a big boot, forcing Kane to fall backwards onto the ring, allowing his right arm to catch ablaze, giving Undertaker the win.

The main event began with "Stone Cold" Steve Austin kicking Dude Love out of the ring and when he returned, diving on him with a Lou Thesz press. After not managing a single piece of offensive attack on Austin, Dude Love ran up the walkway to leave, but Austin caught up behind him with a running clothesline from behind. After Dude tried to escape up onto the band stand, Austin threw him off onto the concrete arena floor. After fighting back down to the ringside, Dude finally managed to subdue Austin, catching him staggering out of the turnbuckle with a bulldog and following up with an elbow drop. As Austin tried to recover, he was caught in a rear naked body scissors choke; just then, Vince McMahon came down to ringside. Eventually Austin managed to escape, elbowing Dude in the face, before instantly gesturing towards McMahon; this allowed Dude to roll Austin up for a pin that only made the two count. Using the ring posts to attack Dude's legs, Austin took the fight outside, but was soon made to regret it after a reversed piledriver saw him falling onto the concrete ramp. By focusing again on McMahon, Dude attacked Austin from behind and when a suplex from the apron failed, he instead pulled Austin down into a cutter on the top rope. Inside the ring, Dude applied an abdominal stretch, with McMahon ordering the timekeeper to ring the bell (which he did not do); this allowed Austin to reverse into his own abdominal stretch until he fell victim to a hip toss. Austin continued by dragging Dude outside the ring and suplexing him onto the steel steps and briefly fighting through the crowd before returning to the ring. Dude Love then stood in the corner warming up for Sweet Shin Music, but Austin caught his leg and spun him around; Dude tried to clothesline Austin and caught the referee instead. Austin then tried a stunner, but instead walked into the mandible claw which took him down. When Dude tried to reapply the hold on a recovering Austin, he was back dropped outside of the ring and followed by Austin who grabbed a chair, but was held back by McMahon. When he escaped McMahon's grip he turned into a punch, through the chair, from Dude. Austin quickly recovered though and punched Dude twice; as McMahon tried to help him up, Austin swung the chair and hit McMahon before rolling Dude into the ring, giving him a stunner and counting his own three count. Austin celebrated his victory, as EMTs came down to attend to McMahon, and left the arena. Gerald Brisco then informed Howard Finkel that Austin had been disqualified and thus Dude Love won the match while the medics tended to McMahon and the show ended.

== Reception ==
In 2008, J.D. Dunn of 411Mania gave the event a rating of 5.5 [Not So Good], stating, "The Inferno Match was the big selling point of the PPV, but Austin versus Dude Love was the only match that delivered. The undercard ranges from crap to crap with an asterisk, so you'll probably be doing a lot of fast-forwarding to get to the main event. Thumbs down".

== Aftermath ==
Sable finally had enough of Marvelous Marc Mero's jealousy and challenged him to a match at Over the Edge and began his heel turn which would see him drop Sable as his valet and join forces with the debuting Jacqueline. Owen Hart joined up with The Nation and turned on his tag team partner Ken Shamrock on the April 27, 1998, episode of Raw.

The Rock & Roll Express would leave the WWF while the New Midnight Express would break up (and forfeit the NWA World Tag Team championship) as the WWF ended its NWA "invasion" angle and the titles returned to NWA control. Bart Gunn would later participate in the Brawl for All while Bob Holly would transform his persona to "Hardcore Holly". Goldust would begin a feud with the debuting Val Venis, who alleged to have had an affair with Goldust's estranged wife Terri and revert to his Dustin Runnells persona.

The In Your House branding was retired following February 1999's St. Valentine's Day Massacre: In Your House event, as the company moved to install permanent names for each of its monthly PPVs. Unforgiven returned in September 1999 as its own PPV event, and thus established Unforgiven as the annual September PPV for the promotion that was renamed to World Wrestling Entertainment (WWE) in 2002. The PPV would continue for another decade, with the final produced in 2008, after which, Unforgiven was discontinued and replaced by Breaking Point in 2009.

== Results ==
No.	Results	Stipulations	Times
1	Faarooq, Ken Shamrock, and Steve Blackman defeated The Nation of Domination (D'Lo Brown, Mark Henry, and The Rock) (with Kama Mustafa) by pinfall	Six-man tag team match	13:32
2	Triple H (c) (with Chyna) defeated Owen Hart by pinfall	Singles match for the WWF European Championship	12:26
3	The Midnight Express (Bodacious Bart and Bombastic Bob) (c) (with Jim Cornette) defeated The Rock 'n' Roll Express (Ricky Morton and Robert Gibson) by pinfall	Tag team match for the NWA World Tag Team Championship	7:12
4	Luna Vachon (with The Artist Formerly Known As Goldust) defeated Sable	Evening gown match	2:50
5	The New Age Outlaws (Billy Gunn and Road Dogg Jesse James) (c) defeated LOD 2000 (Animal and Hawk) (with Sunny) by pinfall	Tag team match for the WWF Tag Team Championship	12:13
6	The Undertaker defeated Kane (with Paul Bearer) by setting Kane on fire	Inferno match	16:00
7	Dude Love defeated "Stone Cold" Steve Austin (c) by disqualification	Singles match for the WWF Championship	18:49
(c) / – the champion(s) heading into the match
