= Fully Loaded: In Your House =

1998 World Wrestling Federation pay-per-view event

- Promotional poster featuring Triple H
- Promotion: World Wrestling Federation
- Date: July 26, 1998
- City: Fresno, California
- Venue: Selland Arena
- Attendance: 9,855
- Buy rate: 305,000

Pay-per-view chronology
← Previous; King of the Ring	Next → SummerSlam

In Your House chronology
← Previous; Over the Edge	Next → Breakdown

Fully Loaded chronology
← Previous; First	Next → 1999

Fully Loaded: In Your House was a 1998 professional wrestling pay-per-view (PPV) event produced by the World Wrestling Federation (WWF, renamed WWE in 2002). It was the 23rd In Your House and the inaugural Fully Loaded. The event took place on July 26, 1998, at the Selland Arena in Fresno, California.

Nine matches were contested at the event. The main event was a tag team match for the WWF Tag Team Championship. Kane and Mankind put the title on the line against The Undertaker and "Stone Cold" Steve Austin, the latter of which was the reigning WWF Champion. Undertaker and Austin won when Undertaker pinned Kane after a Tombstone.

The undercard featured Jacqueline versus Sable in a bikini contest, The Rock versus Triple H in a two of three falls match for the WWF Intercontinental Championship, Owen Hart versus Ken Shamrock in a Dungeon match, Disciples of Apocalypse (8-Ball and Skull) versus L.O.D. 2000 (Hawk and Animal), Mark Henry versus Vader, Faarooq and Scorpio versus Terry Funk and Bradshaw, D'Lo Brown versus X-Pac, and Val Venis versus Jeff Jarrett.

This was one of the In Your House events which later became the title of an annual pay-per-view, replacing the method at the time of making new names for all events aside from the "Big Five" (Royal Rumble, WrestleMania, King of the Ring, SummerSlam, and Survivor Series). Fully Loaded returned in July 1999, becoming the promotion's annual July PPV; however, it was a short-lived event as the final event was held in July 2000.

== Production ==
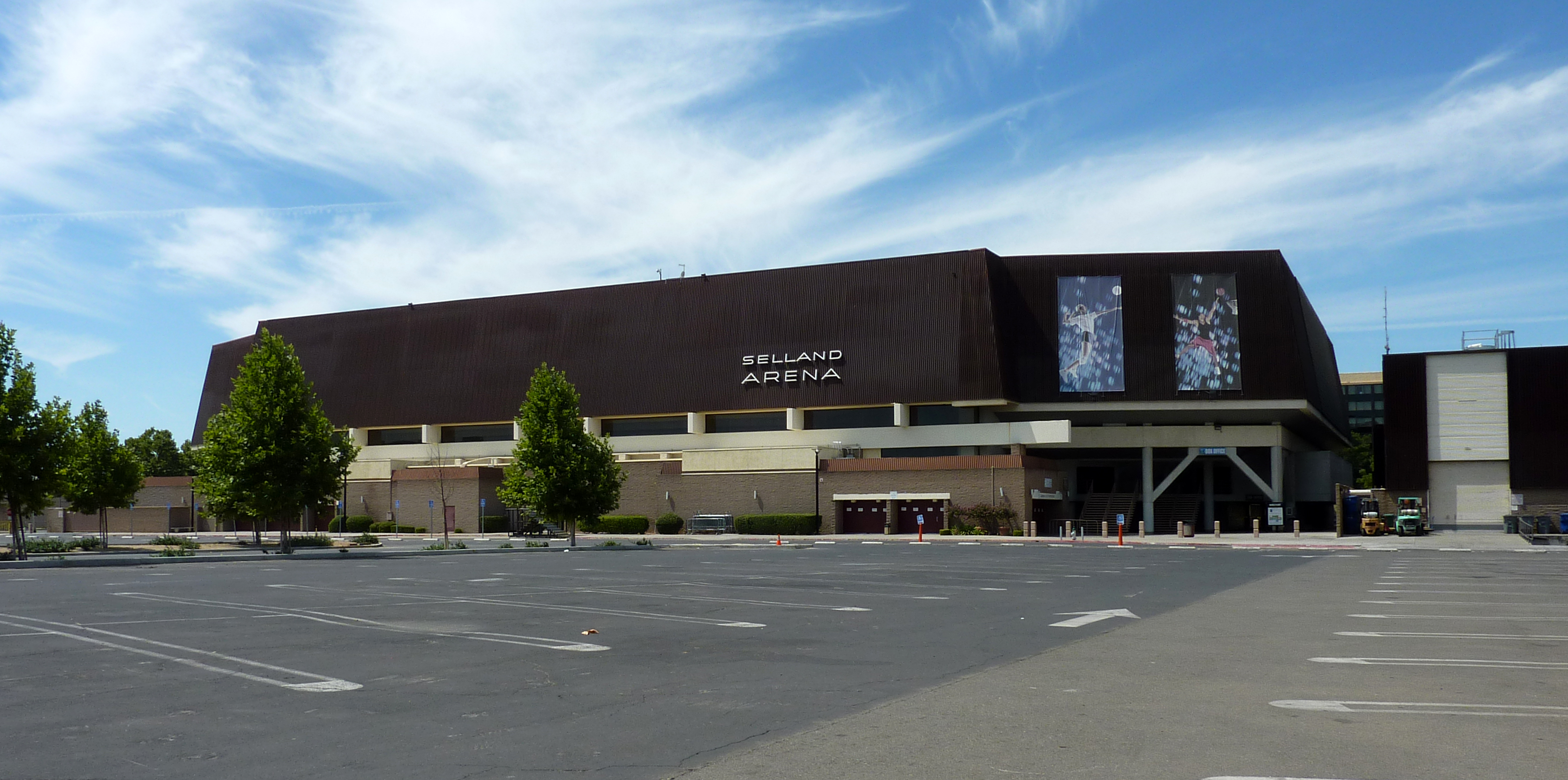
The 23rd In Your House was held at the Selland Arena in Fresno, California.

=== Background ===
In Your House was a series of monthly professional wrestling pay-per-view (PPV) events first produced by the World Wrestling Federation (WWF, renamed WWE in 2002) in May 1995. They aired when the promotion was not holding one of its then-five major PPVs (WrestleMania, King of the Ring, SummerSlam, Survivor Series, and Royal Rumble) and were sold at a lower cost. The 23rd In Your House, titled Fully Loaded: In Your House, was scheduled for July 26, 1998, at the Selland Arena in Fresno, California.

=== Storylines ===
Fully Loaded featured professional wrestling matches that involved different wrestlers from pre-existing feuds, plots, and storylines that were played out on Raw is War—the WWF's flagship television program.

The main rivalry heading into the event was between Kane and Mankind and the WWF Champion "Stone Cold" Steve Austin and The Undertaker over the WWF Tag Team Championship. At King of the Ring, The Undertaker defeated Mankind in a Hell in a Cell match. Later that night, Mankind interfered in Austin and Kane's First Blood match for the WWF Championship. The Undertaker also came out and, ostensibly by accident, hit Austin with a chair, causing him to bleed. As a result, Kane won the title. On the June 29 episode of Raw is War, Austin challenged Kane to a rematch for the title, which Kane accepted. Later that night, Austin defeated Kane to regain the WWF Championship. The following week, on Raw is War, the WWF Chairman Vince McMahon announced that Austin and The Undertaker would team with each other to wrestle Kane and Mankind in a tag team match at Fully Loaded. On July 13, Kane and Mankind defeated New Age Outlaws (Billy Gunn and Road Dogg) to win the WWF Tag Team Championship, making their match with Austin and The Undertaker at Fully Loaded a match for the championship.

Two rivalries heading into the event were created together. One of them was between The Rock and Triple H over the WWF Intercontinental Championship. The other was between Ken Shamrock and Owen Hart. On June 29 episode of Raw is War, Michael Cole interviewed Shamrock on his victory in the 1998 King of the Ring tournament, where Shamrock gave credit to his final round opponent The Rock on his victory. Rock's Nation of Domination teammate and 1994 King of the Ring Owen Hart, who in April had turned on Shamrock in a tag match and joined the Nation, confronted Shamrock and challenged him to a match between the winners of King of the Ring. The 1997 King of the Ring Triple H challenged both men for a Triple Threat match and a match was made between the three King of the Ring winners. Shamrock won the match by pinning Triple H after interference by Rock. As a result, a brawl occurred between Triple H's D-Generation X and Rock's Nation. On the July 6 episode of Raw is War, all the members of DX and comedian Jason Sensation mocked the members of Nation in an infamous parody. On the July 13 episode of Raw is War, Triple H and X-Pac defeated The Rock and Hart in a tag team match. During the match, it was announced that The Rock would defend the Intercontinental Championship against Triple H in a two out of three falls match at Fully Loaded. On the July 20 episode of Raw is War, it was announced that a Dungeon match would take place between Hart and Shamrock in the Hart family dungeon at Fully Loaded and Dan Severn would serve as the special guest referee.

On the June 29 episode of Raw is War, L.O.D. 2000 (Hawk and Animal) called out their famous manager Paul Ellering. Ellering betrayed L.O.D. 2000 by inviting his new tag team Disciples of Apocalypse (8-Ball and Skull). DOA attacked L.O.D. 2000, leading to a match between the two teams at Fully Loaded. Also in Raw is War, on June 8 Nation of Domination enforcer Mark Henry faced Vader in a singles match and dominated him until The Undertaker attacked them both. Henry would attack Vader during his King of The Ring 1998 qualifying match against NOD member The Rock, which triggered Vader attacking Henry back in a tag team match at the same night. Vader later would attack him again, costing Henry his qualifying match against Ken Shamrock on June 22. At King of the Ring, Vader would collide with Henry, thus leading to a match in Fully Loaded.

== Event ==
Other on-screen personnel
Role:	Name:
English commentators	Jim Ross
English commentators	Jerry Lawler
Spanish commentators	Carlos Cabrera
Spanish commentators	Hugo Savinovich
Interviewer	Kevin Kelly
Ring announcer	Howard Finkel
Referees	Tim White
Referees	Jack Doan
Referees	Mike Chioda
Referees	Jim Korderas
Referees	Dave Hebner

=== Preliminary matches ===
The first match that aired live on the event was a standard wrestling match between Val Venis and Jeff Jarrett. Jarrett's allies Southern Justice (Mark Canterbury and Dennis Knight) were sent to backstage before the match by the referee. Venis dominated earlier part of the match with two near-falls. Jarrett powerbombed Venis and threw him outside the ring, where Jarrett's manager Tennessee Lee attacked Venis. Venis returned the ring and performed a Belly to Back Suplex on Jarrett. Jarrett's head collided with the referee's head, allowing Venis to take advantage. He pinned Jarrett with a roll-up to win the match.

The second match was a standard wrestling non-title match between WWF European Champion D'Lo Brown and X-Pac, representing Nation of Domination and D-Generation X respectively. Brown dominated most of the match and nearly finished it by performing his finisher, a Frog Splash, which he called Lo Down, on X-Pac, but X-Pac kicked out at the 2 count. Brown then attempted to perform a Moonsault but X-Pac avoided the move. X-Pac then controlled the match by attacking Brown in the corner until Brown whipped X-Pac into the ropes. Brown's manager The Godfather attacked X-Pac, allowing Brown to perform Rydeen Bomb, which he called Sky High, on X-Pac for the victory.

The third match was a tag team match pitting Faarooq and Scorpio against Justin Bradshaw and Terry Funk. As the match started, Faarooq and Scorpio dominated the earlier part of the match. Bradshaw then battled Faarooq by performing a Superplex and Powerbomb, while Funk battled Scorpio outside the ring. Funk and Scorpio were tagged by their partners Faarooq and Bradshaw, who fought with each other outside the ring. This allowed Scorpio to perform a 450° Splash, which he called Scorpio Splash on Funk for the victory. As a result, Faarooq and Scorpio won the match. After the match, Bradshaw attacked Funk, Scorpio and Faarooq.

The fourth match was a standard wrestling match between Mark Henry and Vader. Initially, Henry dominated Vader using power moves, until Vader countered a sunset flip with a butt drop and got the advantage. He dominated Henry with brawling, eventually performing a second rope splash which he called Vader Crush, but Henry kicked out at 2 to the pin attempt. Henry then recovered and snap powerslammed him, following with a running splash for the victory.

The fifth match was a tag team match between Disciples of Apocalypse (8-Ball and Skull) and L.O.D. 2000 (Hawk and Animal). The match went back and forth with Paul Ellering continuously interfering on DOA's behalf. Both members of DOA dominated Hawk until Hawk clotheslined both members of DOA. Animal was tagged in. LOD performed an Electric Chair Diving Clothesline Combination, which they called Doomsday Device, on the legal member of DOA. Animal attempted to pin the legal DOA member but the illegal member broke the pinfall attempt, allowing the legal man to roll out of the ring and the illegal person took advantage by pinning Animal. As a result of being twins, DOA won the match.

=== Main event matches ===
The sixth match was a Dungeon match between Owen Hart and Ken Shamrock. The match had been taped earlier in the Hart family dungeon. Dan Severn served as the special guest referee. Shamrock and Hart battled each other and tried to make each other submit. Shamrock tried to perform a Kick on Hart, but Hart avoided it and Severn was accidentally hit with it. Hart took advantage and knocked Shamrock out by hitting him with a dumbbell. Hart then applied an Armbar on Shamrock. Severn recovered and saw Shamrock in the hold and thus awarded the victory to Hart.

The seventh match of the event was a two out of three falls match for the WWF Intercontinental Championship. The Rock defended the title against Triple H. As the match started, The Rock's Nation of Domination teammates Mark Henry, The Godfather and D'Lo Brown interfered in the match to help The Rock. This caused Triple H's DX teammates the New Age Outlaws (Billy Gunn and Road Dogg) to interfere in the match and stop the Nation from interfering. The Rock distracted the referee, allowing Brown to distract Triple H, but Triple H hit him with D'Lo's European Championship belt. This allowed The Rock to execute The Rock Bottom on Triple H to win the first fall. Brown climbed on the apron, but Chyna attacked him. X-Pac tried to interfere while Chyna distracted the referee, allowing Triple H to get a chair, but The Rock got it and attempted to perform a Chair Shot on Triple H, but Triple H avoided it and the referee was hit with it. Chyna performed a DDT on Rock onto the chair, allowing Triple H to pin him for the second fall. As the final fall began, Triple H executed The Pedigree on The Rock, but the time limit of the match expired. The match resulted in a no contest, and therefore, The Rock retained the title.

The final match on the undercard was a Bikini contest between Jacqueline and Sable. Jerry Lawler served as the Emcee of the contest. Sable originally won the contest, but was disqualified for not wearing a bikini top as it was revealed that she had hand prints painted on each breast. As a result, Jacqueline was awarded the victory.

The main event was a tag team match for the WWF Tag Team Championship. Kane and Mankind defended the title against "Stone Cold" Steve Austin and The Undertaker. Austin tried to perform a Stone Cold Stunner on Kane, but Kane blocked the move and chokeslammed The Undertaker. The Undertaker and Mankind battled each other outside the ring. Mankind grabbed a chair and threw it into the ring. Austin got the chair and hit Kane with it. However, Kane quickly got control and Kane and Mankind started dominating Austin until Austin performed a Stone Cold Stunner on both Kane and Mankind. The Undertaker was tagged in and he chokeslammed both Kane and Mankind. The Undertaker followed by executing the Tombstone Piledriver on Kane to win the match. As a result, The Undertaker and Austin won the WWF Tag Team Championship.

== Reception ==
In 2002, Scott Keith of 411Mania gave the event a rating of Recommendation to Avoid, stating, "The Bottom Line: Despite the Rick’s protestations against it at the time due to puppy exposure, I gave the show a “Recommendation to Avoid” in my Guide to Every WWF PPV Ever, Part II a couple of years ago, and I gotta stand by it here, as it still sucks. If you want to see Sable’s fake hooters, there’s plenty of places to do so for free, without bothering to waste your money on this tape. Even the WWF promoted it as a buildup show to Summerslam, which shows how much they cared about it."

In 2008, J.D. Dunn of 411Mania gave the event a rating of 5.5 [Not So Good], stating, "The PPVs during this era show one of Vince Russo's major weaknesses, which is that the TV is very good, but the PPVs generally suck. Not only that, but the PPVs are used as a device to build to Raw instead of the other way around. Fully Loaded '98 is no different. Virtually every event on the card builds up to something more entertaining without actually being entertaining itself. Can't recommend it. Mild thumbs down for Fully Loaded '98."

In 2012, Thomas Hall of KB's Wrestling Reviews gave the event a rating of D+, stating, "This show is bad. There are two matches on it worth anything and one is a horrible ending. The main event is solid but it certainly can’t save the show. Aside from that and the opening match, the show is just a waste. Nothing of note happens and the two good matches certainly can’t save it. The rest of the card is just random filler that few cared about. It would get a lot better soon though as the real glory days of the Attitude Era were on the horizon. Skip this for sure though and go grab Summerslam which is light years better and a very solid show."

== Aftermath ==
After defeating Kane and Mankind for the WWF Tag Team Championship, "Stone Cold" Steve Austin and The Undertaker continued their rivalry with Kane and Mankind. On the July 27 episode of Raw is War, Kane and Mankind attacked Austin after Austin and Undertaker's successful WWF Tag Team Championship defense against the New Age Outlaws (Road Dogg and Billy Gunn). On the August 3 episode of Raw is War, Kane and Mankind defeated New Age Outlaws in a tag team match. Later that night, Austin and Undertaker defeated Nation of Domination (The Rock and Owen Hart) to retain the WWF Tag Team Championship, but were attacked by Kane and Mankind after the match. New Age Outlaws came out and attacked all three teams. As a result, on the August 10 episode of Raw is War, Undertaker and Austin defended their titles against Kane and Mankind, Nation of Domination and New Age Outlaws in a Four Corners match. Kane and Mankind won the WWF Tag Team Championship. Tensions started growing between Undertaker and Austin, leading to a match between the two for Austin's WWF Championship at SummerSlam. Austin defeated Undertaker to retain the title. Kane and Mankind also failed to continue their teamwork. At SummerSlam, Kane abandoned Mankind by not appearing during their WWF Tag Team Championship defense against New Age Outlaws. New Age Outlaws defeated Mankind in a Handicap match to win the WWF Tag Team Championship.

The Rock and Triple H also continued their rivalry after Fully Loaded. On the August 3 episode of Raw is War, Triple H defeated his D-Generation X teammate X-Pac to become the number one contender for Rock's WWF Intercontinental Championship at SummerSlam. At SummerSlam, Triple H defeated Rock in a Ladder match to win the Intercontinental Championship.

The In Your House branding was retired following February 1999's St. Valentine's Day Massacre: In Your House event, as the company moved to install permanent names for each of its monthly PPVs. Fully Loaded returned in 1999 as its own PPV event, but it would be a short-lived PPV, as Fully Loaded was discontinued after its 2000 event and was replaced by Vengeance in the 2002 lineup which temporarily replaced Armageddon in 2001 after the September 11 attacks. The 2001 event was originally earmarked as the fourth Fully Loaded but was renamed to WWF InVasion in July 2001.

The event featured the debut of The Undertaker's "Dark Side" (Version 1) entrance theme, which would be altered many times over the following months, as the build to his eventual heel turn and Ministry of Darkness character and stable developed, into early 1999. This theme would become associated with his Attitude Era Ministry "cult leader" character.

== Results ==
No.	Results	Stipulations	Times
1	Val Venis defeated Jeff Jarrett (with Tennessee Lee)	Singles match	7:45
2	D'Lo Brown (with The Godfather) defeated X-Pac (with Chyna)	Singles match	8:26
3	Faarooq and Scorpio defeated Justin Bradshaw and Terry Funk	Tag team match	6:49
4	Mark Henry defeated Vader	Singles match	5:03
5	The Disciples of Apocalypse (8-Ball and Skull) (with Paul Ellering) defeated LOD 2000 (Animal and Hawk)	Tag team match	8:50
6	Owen Hart defeated Ken Shamrock by submission	Dungeon match Dan Severn was the special guest referee.	4:46
7	The Rock (c) vs. Triple H (with Chyna) ended in a time-limit draw of 1–1	Two-out-of-three-falls match for the WWF Intercontinental Championship	30:00
8	Jacqueline defeated Sable by disqualification	Bikini contest Jerry Lawler was the master of ceremonies.	—
9	"Stone Cold" Steve Austin and The Undertaker defeated Kane and Mankind (c) (with Paul Bearer)	Tag team match for the WWF Tag Team Championship	18:08
(c) / – the champion(s) heading into the match
