= SummerSlam (1998) =

World Wrestling Federation pay-per-view event

- Promotional poster by Bob Berry, featuring "Stone Cold" Steve Austin and The Undertaker
- Promotion: World Wrestling Federation
- Date: August 30, 1998
- City: Manhattan, New York
- Venue: Madison Square Garden
- Attendance: 21,588
- Buy rate: 700,000+
- Tagline: Highway to Hell

Pay-per-view chronology
| ← Previous; Fully Loaded: In Your House | Next → Breakdown: In Your House |

SummerSlam chronology
| ← Previous; 1997 | Next → 1999 |

The 1998 SummerSlam, also promoted as SummerSlam: Highway to Hell, was a professional wrestling pay-per-view (PPV) event produced by the World Wrestling Federation (WWF, renamed WWE in 2002). It was the 11th annual SummerSlam and took place on August 30, 1998, from Madison Square Garden (MSG) in the New York City borough of Manhattan, New York. This was the third SummerSlam at MSG, after the inaugural 1988 event and the 1991 event.

Eleven matches were contested at the event, including three on the Sunday Night Heat pre-show. The promotional title was a reference to the main event, which saw "Stone Cold" Steve Austin retain the WWF Championship against The Undertaker. The main match on the undercard featured a ladder match for the WWF Intercontinental Championship between Triple H and The Rock, in which Triple H won to win the title. This SummerSlam was also notable for the PPV in-ring debut of Edge.

== Production ==
=== Background ===
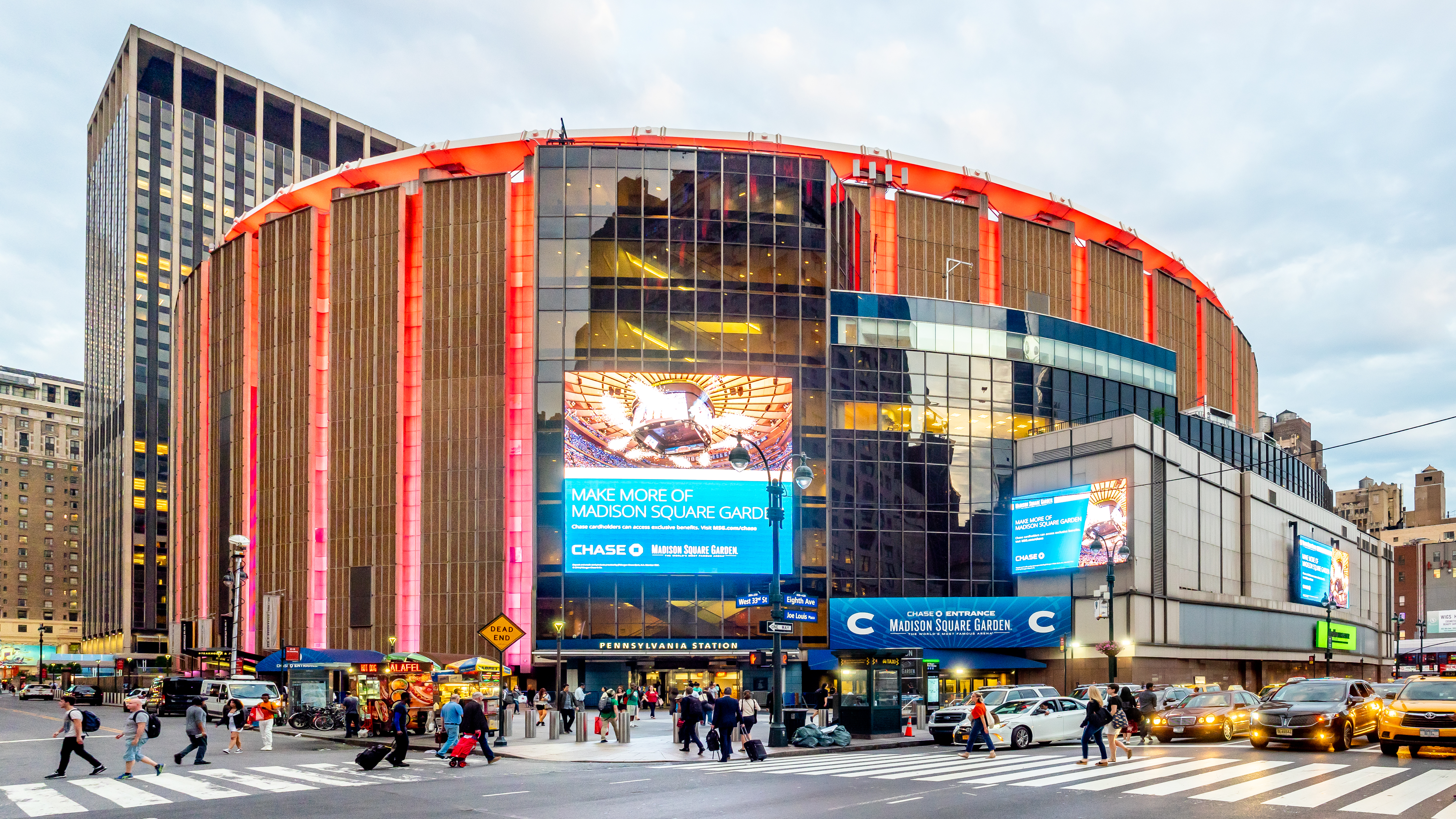
The 11th annual SummerSlam was the third time for the event to be held at Madison Square Garden in the New York City borough of Manhattan, New York, after the inaugural 1988 event and the 1991 event.

SummerSlam is an annual professional wrestling pay-per-view (PPV) event produced every August by the World Wrestling Federation (WWF, renamed WWE in 2002) since 1988. Dubbed "The Biggest Party of the Summer", it is one of the promotion's original four PPVs, along with WrestleMania, Royal Rumble, and Survivor Series, referred to as the "Big Four", and was considered one of the "Big Five" PPVs with the addition of King of the Ring in 1993. It has since become considered the WWF's second biggest event of the year behind WrestleMania. The 11th SummerSlam was scheduled to be held on August 30, 1998, from Madison Square Garden (MSG) in the New York City borough of Manhattan, New York, marking the third SummerSlam at MSG, after the inaugural 1988 event and the 1991 event.

=== Storylines ===
The main storyline heading into the event revolved around WWF Champion "Stone Cold" Steve Austin and The Undertaker. At King of the Ring, Austin had lost his championship in the inaugural First Blood match, however he won it back the next night on Raw is War.

The pay-per-view match ended in controversy though; Kane's partner Mankind came to the ring, followed by The Undertaker, whose attempted chair shot to Mankind was mistimed and instead met Austin, opening him up and costing him the match. Until this point, The Undertaker had shown nothing but disdain for his younger brother since his debut the previous October but he explained on Raw that he would not sit idly by while his brother set himself on fire (the stipulation of the First Blood match should Kane lose). On the July 6 episode of Raw is War, Vince McMahon announced a SummerSlam #1 Contender's match between Kane, The Undertaker and Mankind. When The Undertaker did not appear the match was started anyway with Kane savagely beating Mankind and winning much to the delight of McMahon, however mid celebration Kane ripped off his mask to reveal it was actually The Undertaker in disguise.

McMahon became obsessed with proving the brothers were conspiring against Austin and tried to prove this by putting champion and contender in a match for the WWF Tag Team Championship at Fully Loaded. McMahon could not bait The Undertaker though as the team won the match but did not unify as a team for long, defending the titles until August 10, losing in a four corners tag match to Kane and Mankind. The next week, Austin arrived on Raw in a hearse and challenged The Undertaker to a fight; at the end of the show The Undertaker came to the ring and Austin followed, however when The Undertaker fully faced Austin it became apparent it was actually Kane in his brother's attire, using his hair to hide his mask previously. Austin threw Kane in the back of the hearse but when he went to drive away, The Undertaker appeared in the driver's seat and drove his brother away, thus revealing the alliance between the two, cemented by a beat down on Paul Bearer the following week, and greatly reducing Austin's chances at SummerSlam.

The second storyline heading into the event involved The Rock defending the WWF Intercontinental Championship against Triple H in a Ladder Match. Last month at Fully Loaded, The Rock and Triple H fought for the Intercontinental Championship in a two out of three falls match which ended in a no contest. The two continued their rivalry while leading up their respective factions Nation of Domination and D-Generation X (DX). On the August 17 episode of Raw is War, DX and the Nation fought in a street fight which the Nation won when The Rock rammed a ladder in Triple H's face causing him to bleed from the mouth. Backstage after the match, Triple H challenged The Rock to a Ladder match for the Intercontinental title at SummerSlam. On the August 23 episode of Sunday Night Heat, The Rock accepted the challenge.

== Event ==
Other on-screen personnel
| Role: | Name: |
|---|---|
| English commentators | Jim Ross |
| English commentators | Jerry Lawler |
| Spanish commentators | Carlos Cabrera |
| Spanish commentators | Hugo Savinovich |
| Interviewers | Michael Cole |
| Interviewers | Dok Hendrix |
| Ring announcer | Howard Finkel (first 2 matches on Heat) |
| Ring announcer | Tony Chimel (final Heat match/PPV) |
| Referees | Tim White |
| Referees | Earl Hebner |
| Referees | Jim Korderas |
| Referees | Jack Doan |
| Referees | Mike Chioda |

D'Lo Brown defended his European Championship against Val Venis, initially showing respect to him when the two slapped hands. However, Brown would soon use his chest protector to gain leverage over Venis when the latter made an early advantage. Despite the protector, Venis still managed to retain some offensive momentum, legsweeping Brown out of the turnbuckle leading the champion to escape outside the ring. The two then embarked on a number of Irish whip maneuvers with frequent reversals, Venis perhaps taking Brown down more often. Despite flooring Venis with an Irish whip to the turnbuckle, Brown lost any advantage by gesturing to the crowd, though Venis' comeback was short-lived. Brown kept Venis mostly low, making many ground attacks from a standing position and the top ropes, often trying pins in between then switching tactics by applying a Texas cloverleaf. Rather than keep the pressure though, Brown let go and missed a senton bomb from the second rope, allowing Venis to recover and fight back with knees to the chest and elbow attacks. Venis tried to capitalize on this with his finisher, the money shot, but as Brown began to stand up Venis opted for a dropkick instead, however he was met with the grip of Brown who turned it into a Sky High instead but still Venis would not be pinned, similarly even after a DDT. Brown tried a high flying move of his own but Venis caught him mid air for a scoop slam. Despite subduing Brown with a double-armed suplex and a slam, Brown managed to get his knees up and after this attempted a powerbomb. The first powerbomb was unsuccessful though, Brown unable to flip Venis onto his shoulders and subsequently dropping him onto his head; the second though was a successful running powerbomb but rather than pin him, Brown attempted, and missed, the Lo Down. Venis then pulled off Brown's chest protector, putting it on himself and causing the referee to try to pull it off him. As Venis climbed the turnbuckle the referee accidentally pulled the ropes, causing Venis to land on his crotch. He still managed a Manhattan drop on Brown though, trying to climb the turnbuckle again with the referee still pulling at the chest protector. This time Venis shoved the referee to the ground, causing him to lose the match via disqualification; after the match he slammed the referee and landed the Moneyshot.

The Oddities, welcomed to the ring by Insane Clown Posse singing their music, lived up to their title when Golga, having had his head smashed against the turnbuckle by Taka Michinoku, headbanged voluntarily. After pouring water into Yamaguchi-San's shoe, the match began in earnest with Funaki being thrown around the ring by Kurrgan and despite the entire team illegally attacking Kurrgan, holding his arms, he still managed to kick away Funaki and toss the others restraining his hand. When Giant Silva was tagged in, all of Kaientai fled the ring, regrouping outside before Dick Togo was sent into the ring but similar to before the entire team soon ganged up on him but Silva piled all four of them into the turnbuckle, crushing them back into the padding before Irish whipping them into the opposite corner and then tossing Taka over the top rope, falling onto the other three members. Golga was the first Oddity brought to the floor, with a double slam by Funaki and Mens Teioh which was followed up by four big splashes by all members. Kai En Tai followed suite with four running elbow drops but a four-man Irish whip was met with a clothesline that took all of them out. With Kurrgan tagged in, the four tried to attack him but Kurrgan and Silva choked all four between the two of them. Yamaguchi tried to attack Kurrgan from behind but Luna Vachon scoop slammed him and all four of Kai En Tai received a chokeslam in unison and Golga covered all four of them to pick up the pin count.

The Hair match saw Jeff Jarrett's accomplices, Southern Justice, sent to the back by Commissioner Slaughter whilst Howard Finkel accompanied X-Pac to the ring, performing the signature crotch chops. The match moved both in and out of the ring early on, with Jarrett rushing X-Pac's open legs onto the ring post, leaving him almost to be counted out. When he returned to the ring, Jarrett continued his dominance with basic punching and Irish whips to the turnbuckle. X-Pac returned with a desperate swinging DDT allowing him to take some time to recover, but his attacking maneuvers were met with a sleeper hold. An attempt to put Jarrett in the sleeper hold saw him lifted from behind onto the turnbuckle but X-Pac used this to his advantage, spinning round into a crossbody which missed contact with his opponent. With both men on the floor, Jarrett applied his figure four leg lock in the middle of the ring, which X-Pac struggled to counter by turning over, eventually making it to the rope after a minute or so. Jarrett tried to lock the submission again but X-Pac kicked him from behind into the corner, catching him with a backdrop as Jarrett stumbled out. Despite a spinning heel kick and bronco buster, Jarrett was still able to land a diving crossbody, though X-Pac rolled it in his favor. Finkel climbed onto the apron to complain of a low blow attempt, when Jarrett turned back to the ring X-Pac landed an X Factor. Southern Justice appeared from the back, but X-Pac ducked El Kabong from Dennis Knight, grabbing the guitar and hitting Jarrett with it while the referee pushed Southern Justice out of the ring. Once the pinfall was made, fellow Degenerates, New Age Outlaws rushed to ringside with chairs to chase away Southern Justice while The Headbangers and Darren Drozdov helped hold Jarrett in his chair while he had his hair removed, though he escaped the ring before he was completely shaved bald.

Sable arrived to the ring and introduced her mystery tag team partner, with Edge coming through the crowd to make his pay-per-view debut. Marc Mero and Edge were the initial opponents though Mero soon tagged in Jacqueline, however she immediately tagged Mero back when confronted by Sable. On the outside Jacqueline pulled at Edge's feet while running, allowing Mero to take the advantage and, with the referee distracted, choked him on the bottom rope. Mero attempted a TKO but Edge swung round to secure a DDT and with both men down they crawled to tag in their prospective female partners. Sable instantly scooped Jacqueline and punched her before chasing her around the ring and back in. Inside the ring Mero tried to subdue Sable, but he was lowblowed and then he almost got a Sable Bomb, but Jacqueline saved Mero this allowed Jacqueline to take some advantage but Sable soon turned the tables back in her favor, landing a TKO on Jacqueline. Mero pulled Sable off the pin and while distracted, was double teamed by both opponents. Jacqueline accidentally hit her partner though, letting Sable tag in Edge who made a running suicide leap onto Mero, before whipping him into the steel steps and spanking Jacqueline on the walkway. A pinning attempt after a super neckbreaker was put on hold when Mero's partner put his feet on the bottom rope. Once again the two accidentally collided, when Edge ducked out of the way leaving Jacqueline on the outside of the ring. When Mero went to the top rope, Edge reversed leaving him sitting on the turnbuckle and then tagged in Sable who delivered a frankensteiner. Edge then went to pin Mero but leapt off him when he saw Jacqueline flying for a splash, leading the two to collide once again. Sable and Edge then whipped their respective opponents into the corner, with Mero falling out of it and then Jacqueline falling head first onto his crotch. Edge then grabbed Sable by her legs and planted her face first onto Mero to secure the pin.

The Lion's Den match, which took place at the Paramount Theater within Madison Square Garden in front of a special crowd, was contested in a pseudo-circular polygon cage, with steel wire and no ropes approximately ten feet high. After both competitors entered the den, the door was chained shut. The match began with Owen Hart being driven into the steel wall and then slammed into the ground, though Ken Shamrock would receive the same treatment. Shamrock then backdropped Hart and picked up to hold him in submission around his head. Though Hart threw Shamrock into the wall, Shamrock instantly retaliated with a clothesline and proceeded to pull off Hart's shirt and use it to choke Hart from behind, bringing him down with a snapmare using the cloth and continuing to pull at his neck. As Hart stood up, Shamrock jumped into the cage and jumped back off it, higher, to crossbody his opponent. After throwing Hart into the wall again, Shamrock soon felt the wrath of the den as he was driven into the metal frames that secured the chain. Hart caught Shamrock's foot, but the latter followed through with an enzuigiri negating either advantage. As the two returned to their feet it became an exchange of punches before Shamrock again used the cage to aid him into a flying shoulder barge, but the second time he did this Hart caught him and slammed him into the mat and used the advantage to lock in the Sharpshooter. Shamrock slowly crawled to the cage and used his fingers to climb up, building pressure on his own legs but making it awkward for Hart to sustain the hold. Despite breaking out Hart managed to catch Shamrock, bending him backwards with his arm wrapped around Shamrock's neck. Shamrock broke free by walking up the steel and flipping over the back of Hart, tripping him with a toe hold that allowed him to utilize an arm bar submission before applying his ankle lock that forced Dan Severn to walk away in disgust and Hart to tap out.

With Kane absent from the arena, the falls count anywhere match for the WWF Tag Team Championship became a de facto handicap match. New Age Outlaws brought out a dumpster full of weapons, alluding to an incident in February where they had locked Mankind, as Cactus Jack, and Chainsaw Charlie in a dumpster and thrown it off the stage. Billy Gunn ran into the ring and met with a baking tray to his head from Mankind before the two had a sword fight of sorts, with a steel chair. Despite Mankind taking the advantage from this, the tandem attacks of baking sheets to the head subdued Mankind until he was caught in the ropes. After taking more weapons to the head, Mankind managed to toss Gunn over his back to the outside and fought Road Dogg into the corner. When Mankind went back out the ring to continue his assault on Gunn, though, the handicap caught up with him and he was thrown against the dumpster. Road Dogg opened up a table in the corner but Mankind managed to reverse the Irish whip, forcing Gunn through it. After a double team elevated neckbreaker did not dispatch him, he suffered a double team powerbomb through two chairs and again this did not keep Mankind down (although after Mankind kicked out, the Outlaws music briefly played) but finally a spiked piledriver onto the championship belt was enough to keep him down. After winning, Outlaws put Mankind in the dumpster and closed the lid. Whilst the Outlaws celebrated, the lid of the dumpster opened and Kane stood up, picking up a sledgehammer and throwing it down on an unseen Mankind inside the dumpster.

Triple H entered the ring behind the DX Band, performing Break It Down live, finishing with Chris Warren on Triple H's shoulders and the band throwing the drums apart. The WWF Intercontinental Championship Ladder match began with Triple H clotheslining The Rock to the floor and striking him on the ground before a facebuster onto his knee and crotch chopping Rock. An early Rock Bottom was blocked with a strike, while Rock reversed the Pedigree by standing up and forcing Triple H over the top rope onto the mat. Rock's attempt to bring the ladder into the match saw him attacked from behind by Triple H and thrown from crowd barrier into crowd barrier. Inside the ring, Rock was allowed some time and used it to recover and take the fight to Triple H, throwing him through the ladder back outside the ring. As Rock secured the ladder inside the ring and began to climb it, Triple H slowly made his way back to ringside, climbing from the apron to the turnbuckle and jumping into Rock's back, forcing his head into the ladder and causing him to fall off however as the momentum shook Triple H to the side, the ladder fell on top of him. After Triple H drove the ladder into Rock's chest he began to climb it but four steps up, Rock pulled away at his leg, causing him to land on his previously injured knee. After continuing to work on Triple H's knee, Rock pushed the ladder onto his leg and then used it as a vice, trapping his knee in it and kicking the ladder on it, then using a chair similar to a hammer, reinforcing the ladder onto the knee. Rock then set up the ladder horizontally between the steps and the crowd barrier, picking his opponent up for a modified atomic drop, but with the knee taking the brunt of the drop onto the ladder. However, as The Rock took his time to take the ladder into the ring and set it up before climbing it, Triple H was able to desperately push his opponent off it and throw him out of the ring. The advantage did not remain though, as his own plans were used against him when Rock threw Triple H by his legs into the closed ladder, then falling face first onto the Spanish announce table. As Triple H crawled around, the fight moved to the walkway where both opponents threw each other into the barriers before Triple H tried to perform a Pedigree onto the ladder, but was tossed over his back onto it instead. Back inside the ring, Mark Henry threw a second ladder to Rock which he began to climb while Henry tried to subdue Triple H on the outside but was met with a forearm by Chyna. Triple H arrived just in time to push Rock off the ladder, crashing onto the mat and outside the ring. Triple H received similar treatment after recovering, then climbing the ladder only to have the ladder fall away from beneath him. After a DDT that left both men floored, both men eventually stood back up and then climbed either side of the same ladder, punching each other at the top with Triple H being thrown into the ladder in the turnbuckle and rebound to knock Rock off the ladder onto the ropes. Chyna had Triple H a chair which he hit Rock with, albeit with a ladder in the middle and continued a barrage of chair shots onto Rock through the ladder. This would not keep Rock down though, as he soon scooped Triple H onto the ladder and performed the People's Elbow with Triple H lying on the ladder. Despite receiving a Rock Bottom, Triple H managed to stagger to his feet just in time to pull Rock off the top rung of the ladder by his trunks and flooring him with a Pedigree. Struggling back to his feet anyway, Henry threw flour into Triple H's eyes but he slowly managed to climb by feel alone; although Rock was able to climb up to the top and meet him, Chyna used her forearm to low blow Rock, buying Triple H enough time to take the belt from where it was hanging.

The WWF Championship match began with each wrestler punching the other into the corner. After some grappling, a flurry of reversed arm twists refused to give either wrestler a noticeable advantage with Austin eventually dragging The Undertaker to the ground with an arm bar. Eventually Undertaker stood up and the two fought back and forth again, with Austin attempting a Lou Thesz press but being caught in a bear hug before having his neck thrown on the ropes. After this he began to attack Austin's back, first in the turnbuckle and then trying to trap him on the apron, but "Stone Cold" soon caught his opponent's leg and bashed it into the ring post. Austin returned to the knee, stomping it, after yanking Undertaker off the top rope from an Old School. It was at this point Kane made his presence known, walking solemnly to the ring but The Undertaker composed himself and sent him to the back. Again Austin attacked Undertaker's knee, using the leverage of the ring apron until an enraged Undertaker grabbed Austin by the neck, picking him up from the outside to the apron and then carrying him over the top rope and running, plunging him into the mat for a running chokeslam. The fight was then taken to the outside of the ring, going up the walk way and through the crowd with Austin being thrown over the crowd barrier and back into the ring. Austin, however, attempted a stunner and Undertaker responded by walking backwards, flipping over the top rope to the outside. When "Stone Cold" tried to attack him, he was caught in mid air and rammed into the ringpost. He was then smacked into the exposed Spanish announce table and left lying there was Undertaker went back into the ring and climbed the turnbuckle to deliver a flying guillotine leg drop that did connect, but did not break the table. When both competitors made it back to the ring, Austin kicked out of the pin count and when both resumed fighting the match was at a stalemate, with an exchange of attacks leading to a double clothesline, flooring both competitors. When the two made it up from that, though, Austin took a definite advantage, ramming his shoulder into Undertaker's chest before striking both a Lou Thesz press and an elbow drop. A botched stunner, turned neckbreaker, saw Undertaker kick out at two and in the ensuing fight, chokeslam the champion once more, signaling for his finisher. However, "Stone Cold" slipped off Undertaker's back when he tried this, but couldn't manage a stunner himself, the challenger picking him up by the leg and leaving him stranded on the ropes before pulling him to the ground with a Russian leg sweep, causing him to bleed from his mouth. When Undertaker tried an Old School again, it seemed successful until he jumped off the ropes and met with a low blow which caused him to stumble and fall into a Stone Cold Stunner, losing the match via pinfall. The Undertaker almost instantly sat up, having grabbed the championship belt from the referee and stood opposite Austin. Rather than strike him though, he gave the belt to the champion and nodded in respect, retiring to the walkway where he was met shoulder to shoulder with Kane, both looking on as Austin celebrated.

== Reception ==
The event has received positive reviews from critics, as many consider it the show that permanently turned the tide of the Monday Night War with World Championship Wrestling (WCW) in the WWF's favor.

In 2017, Kevin Pantoja of 411Mania gave the event a rating of 7.0 [Good], stating, "I’d call this one of the better SummerSlam events in history. The only thing that I found truly bad was the overly long Oddities tag. The other two tag matches were both lackluster but not terrible. The rest of the show rules though. You have arguably the best Taker/Austin match, a surprisingly good opener, the cool Lion’s Den match, a good Hair vs. Hair match and of course, the standout Ladder match that helped make two of the biggest stars in company history."

In 2018, Chris of Retro Pro Wrestling gave the event a rating of Outstanding, stating, "By far one of the better Summerslams in the event's history up to that point, there wasn't a single bad match on the card tonight. OK, so the Oddities/Kai En Tai comedy spot wasn't to everyone's liking, but it was harmless fun and this fan enjoyed it just fine. Elsewhere, we got good matches from D'Lo/Val, X-Pac/Jarrett and Austin/Taker, whilst Triple H and The Rock stole the show long before stealing the show became the prerogative of modern performers. Overall, an outstanding show that is definitely worth watching."

In 2022, John Canton of TJRWrestling gave the event a rating of 8/10, stating, "Good matches all night long plus the breakout ladder match by Hunter and Rock make this one of the better SummerSlams ever. Fun to watch when it happened and still brings a smile to my face nearly 20 years later."

== Aftermath ==
"Stone Cold" Steve Austin and The Undertaker continued to feud following SummerSlam, and eventually it was revealed that both The Undertaker and Kane were in cahoots with Vince McMahon to try to rid Austin of the title. This led to a match at Breakdown: In Your House in September between Austin and the brothers, where The Undertaker and Kane were not allowed to pin each other. The match ended with both The Undertaker and Kane pinning Austin simultaneously, which cost Austin the WWF Championship but left the title vacant. Austin was then forced to be the special guest referee for a match between The Undertaker and Kane for the vacant title at Judgment Day: In Your House in October, where he was threatened with being fired if he did not count the fall. Late in the match, after The Undertaker hit Kane with a chair handed to him by his brother's manager Paul Bearer, Austin attacked The Undertaker and counted both men pinned, declaring himself the champion. McMahon made good on his threat to fire Austin immediately thereafter, and the title remained vacant until Survivor Series. The night after Judgment Day, The Undertaker reunited with Paul Bearer and began recruiting for his Ministry of Darkness.

After defeating Owen Hart, Ken Shamrock's longstanding feud that dated back to when Hart had joined the Nation of Domination came to an end. After briefly joining forces with The Rock and Mankind, Shamrock turned on Mankind and became a heel. The turn coincided with a legitimate injury suffered by Triple H, who was stripped of the Intercontinental Championship shortly after SummerSlam due to an injury. Shamrock won an eight-man tournament for the Intercontinental Championship in October and held it for the remainder of the year. Before the end of the year, Shamrock also joined The Corporation.

D-Generation X continued to feud with Jeff Jarrett and Southern Justice for one additional pay-per-view, with the New Age Outlaws and X-Pac defeating Jarrett and his valets at Breakdown. X-Pac began feuding with D-Lo Brown after Breakdown and won the European Championship twice, while Road Dogg and Billy Gunn reigned as tag team champions until they were defeated by The Corporation's Ken Shamrock and The Big Boss Man in December 1998.

As for Jarrett and Hart, they eventually began teaming together following Summerslam. Although Hart largely began wrestling as "The Blue Blazer" shortly after the team was founded, the two enjoyed some success as a team and eventually became tag team champions in January 1999.

After defeating The Rock in the ladder match to become Intercontinental Champion for the second time, Triple H had suffered a knee injury and he took time off to have surgery. On October 9, Vince McMahon stripped Triple H of the championship and set up a tournament for the vacated title which saw Ken Shamrock defeat X-Pac in the finals to become the new champion. Triple H would return in November 1998 and reunite with X-Pac saving him from a beating at the hands of Shamrock and Big Bossman. He would continue to feud with The Rock who was part of The Corporation challenging him twice for the WWF Championship. At the end of the year he would challenge Shamrock for the Intercontinental title. He won the match by disqualification when Shamrock refused to release his Ankle lock submission hold. After the match, Billy Gunn saved Triple H which lead to a feud between him and Shamrock. The feud between DX and The Corporation continued until March 1999.

Although he was still considered to be a heel going into SummerSlam, The Rock became a face shortly thereafter due to an increasingly positive crowd reaction. It was during this time that he began aggressively promoting himself as "The People's Champion", which eventually led him into a feud with McMahon entering Survivor Series and the two eventually becoming allies.

After over two years of portraying a tortured soul character, Mankind began a transition towards a more comedic character. After his brief feud with Shamrock, which included an Intercontinental Championship match at Judgment Day that Mankind lost, he began aligning himself with Vince McMahon in an attempt to become his friend. This led to Mankind becoming McMahon's protege, and led to Mankind apparently being given an easy road to win the vacant WWF title. The end of this angle coincided with the end of McMahon's feud with The Rock, and after Survivor Series Mankind and The Rock began a feud that led until the following February.

After helping Sable defeat Marc Mero and Jacqueline, Edge entered a feud with Gangrel that eventually included Christian Cage, who was introduced as his storyline brother. After feuding for several weeks Edge was eventually convinced to join with Gangrel and Christian and the three formed a stable known as The Brood. Sable and Jacqueline then began feuding over the reactivated WWF Women's Championship, which Jacqueline won in September and Sable defeated her for in November at Survivor Series. Marc Mero quietly disappeared from the WWF shortly after going on a losing streak.

== Results ==
| No. | Results | Stipulations | Times |
|---|---|---|---|
| 1^{H} | Too Much (Brian Christopher and Scott Taylor) defeated L.O.D. 2000 (Animal and Hawk) (with Droz) | Tag team match | 2:14 |
| 2^{H} | Gangrel defeated Dustin Runnels | Singles match | 2:32 |
| 3^{H} | The Disciples of Apocalypse (8-Ball and Skull) (with Paul Ellering) defeated Bradshaw and Vader | Tag team match | 2:56 |
| 4 | D'Lo Brown (c) defeated Val Venis by disqualification | Singles match for the WWF European Championship | 15:24 |
| 5 | The Oddities (Giant Silva, Golga, and Kurrgan) (with Luna Vachon, Shaggy 2 Dope, and Violent J) defeated Kaientai (Dick Togo, Men's Teioh, Sho Funaki, and Taka Michinoku) (with Yamaguchi-san) | 4-on-3 Handicap match | 10:10 |
| 6 | X-Pac (with Howard Finkel) defeated Jeff Jarrett | Hair vs. Hair match | 11:11 |
| 7 | Edge and Sable defeated Marc Mero and Jacqueline | Mixed tag team match | 8:26 |
| 8 | Ken Shamrock defeated Owen Hart (with Dan Severn) by submission | Lion's Den match | 9:15 |
| 9 | The New Age Outlaws (Road Dogg and Billy Gunn) defeated Mankind (c) | 2-on-1 Falls Count Anywhere handicap match for the WWF Tag Team Championship | 5:17 |
| 10 | Triple H (with Chyna) defeated The Rock (c) (with Mark Henry) by retrieving the championship belt | Ladder match for the WWF Intercontinental Championship | 25:58 |
| 11 | "Stone Cold" Steve Austin (c) defeated The Undertaker | Singles match for the WWF Championship | 20:55 |
(c) / – the champion(s) heading into the match; H / – the match was broadcast prior to the pay-per-view on Sunday Night Heat
