= Fully Loaded (1999) =

World Wrestling Federation pay-per-view event

- Promotional poster featuring Chyna and Triple H
- Promotion: World Wrestling Federation
- Date: July 25, 1999
- City: Buffalo, New York
- Venue: Marine Midland Arena
- Attendance: 16,605
- Buy rate: 334,000
- Tagline: End of a Era

Pay-per-view chronology
← Previous; King of the Ring	Next → SummerSlam

Fully Loaded chronology
← Previous; In Your House	Next → 2000

The 1999 Fully Loaded was a professional wrestling pay-per-view (PPV) event produced by the World Wrestling Federation (WWF, renamed WWE in 2002). It was the second annual Fully Loaded and took place on July 25, 1999, at the Marine Midland Arena in Buffalo, New York. The first Fully Loaded in July 1998 was an In Your House event, but following the discontinuation of the In Your House series after February 1999, a second Fully Loaded was scheduled as its own PPV event, thus being the second former In Your House event to do so, after Over the Edge.

Matches at the event were fought in a number of venues, including a parking garage. The main event was a First Blood match for the WWF Championship. "Stone Cold" Steve Austin defeated The Undertaker to retain the title by hitting him with a television camera and causing him to bleed after interference by X-Pac. The match stipulated that if The Undertaker won, Austin would never wrestle for the WWF Championship ever again, but if Austin won, WWF Chairman Vince McMahon could never appear on WWF television.

The undercard featured Triple H versus The Rock in a strap match, Road Dogg and X-Pac versus Billy Gunn and Chyna in a tag team match for the rights to the D-Generation X name, Ken Shamrock versus Steve Blackman in an Iron Circle match, Big Show versus Kane, Al Snow versus Big Boss Man for the WWF Hardcore Championship, Mideon versus D'Lo Brown for the WWF European Championship, The Hardy Boyz (Jeff Hardy and Matt Hardy) and Michael Hayes versus The Acolytes (Faarooq and Bradshaw) in a Handicap match for the WWF Tag Team Championship, and Edge versus Jeff Jarrett for the WWF Intercontinental Championship.

== Production ==
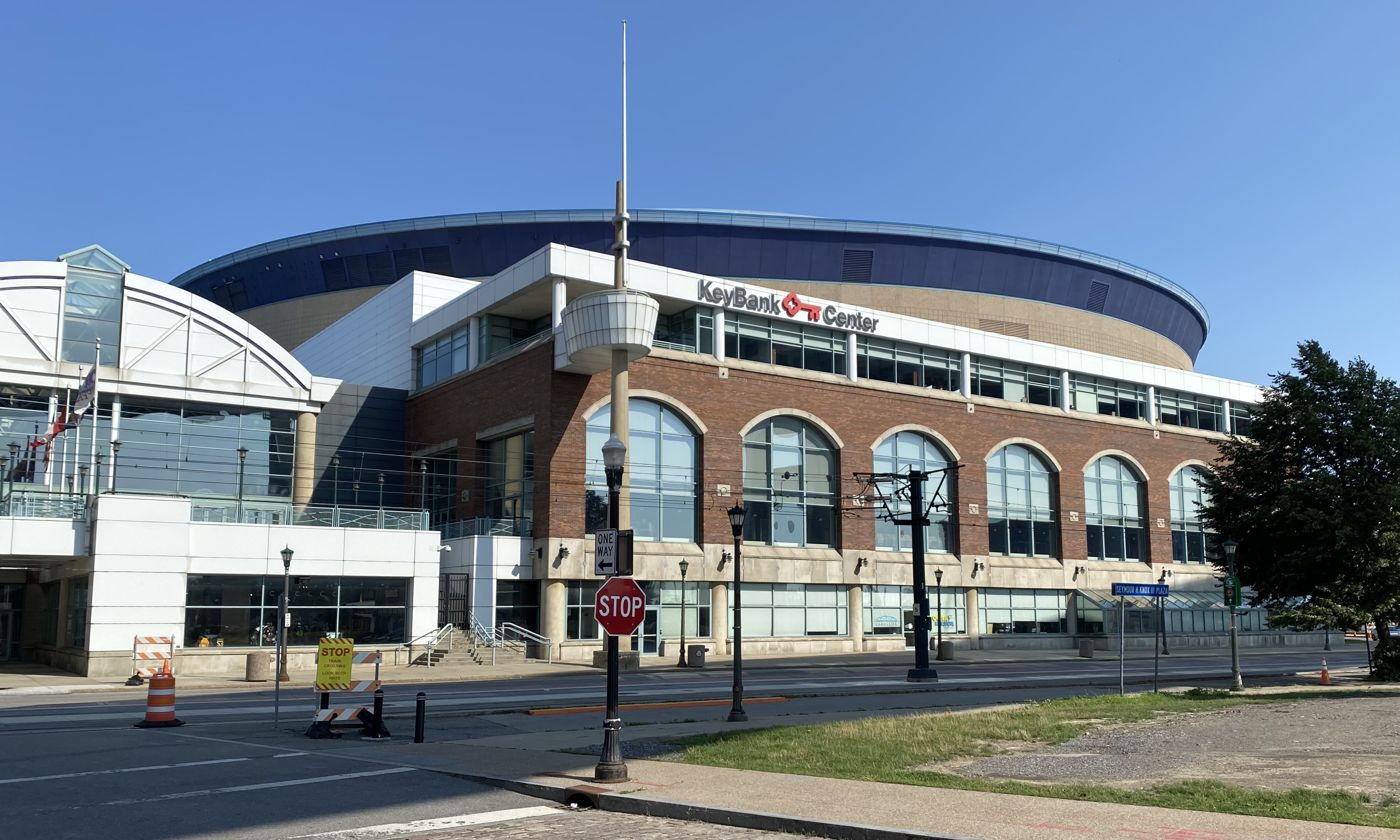
The second annual Fully Loaded was held in Buffalo, New York at the Marine Midland Arena (pictured in 2021 after it had since been renamed as KeyBank Center).

=== Background ===
From May 1995 to February 1999, the professional wrestling company World Wrestling Federation (WWF, renamed WWE in 2002) ran a series of pay-per-view (PPV) events titled In Your House. They aired when the promotion was not holding one of its then-five major PPVs (WrestleMania, King of the Ring, SummerSlam, Survivor Series, and Royal Rumble) and were sold at a lower cost. Following St. Valentine's Day Massacre: In Your House in February 1999, the In Your House branding was retired to give each monthly PPV a permanent identity.

Prior to the discontinuation of the In Your House series, the WWF held Fully Loaded: In Your House in July 1998, which was the 23rd In Your House event. A second Fully Loaded was scheduled to be held on July 25, 1999, at the Marine Midland Arena in Buffalo, New York, promoting it as a standalone event, establishing Fully Loaded as the annual July PPV event. It was the second former In Your House event to continue as its own distinct PPV series, after Over the Edge.

=== Storylines ===
Fully Loaded featured professional wrestling matches that involved different wrestlers from pre-existing feuds, plots, and storylines that were played out on Raw Is War—the WWF's flagship television program.

==== Main feud ====
The main rivalry heading into the event was over the WWF Championship and involved reigning champion "Stone Cold" Steve Austin, former champion The Undertaker, and WWF owner Vince McMahon. Austin and The Undertaker first crossed paths at Over the Edge, where Vince’s son Shane McMahon (with whom Vince had been feuding) executed a fast count on Austin to give the victory to The Undertaker. Shortly after Over the Edge, it was revealed that The Undertaker had been taking orders from a “higher power”, and it was later revealed that the “higher power” had been Vince McMahon all along. This backfired on McMahon, however, as his wife Linda and his daughter Stephanie confronted him; Linda announced that she would be resigning as on-screen WWF CEO and that Austin would be appointed in her place. This would lead to a handicap ladder match at King of the Ring where Austin took on Vince and Shane for full control of the WWF; thanks again to shenanigans orchestrated by the McMahons, Austin lost the match.

On the June 28 episode of Raw is War, a gloating McMahon named Triple H the number one contender to The Undertaker’s championship and announced that Austin would be fired as CEO and that he was going down to "the bottom of the ladder". However, Austin once again ruined McMahon’s plan and dropped a bombshell of his own. First, he said he signed himself to a new contract which gave him the ability to assault McMahon whenever he wanted. Second, knowing that it was likely that the McMahons would try to screw Austin over, before their match, Austin booked a title defense for The Undertaker against him in the main event and if The Undertaker got disqualified or anyone interfered in the match, he would lose the title. Austin defeated The Undertaker to win the title, but was attacked by The Undertaker after the match and busted open. On the July 4 episode of Sunday Night Heat, The Undertaker challenged Austin to a First Blood match for the title at Fully Loaded. On the July 5 episode of Raw Is War, Vince added a further stipulation. He said that the WWF was not big enough for both him and Austin and decided to make a deal with Austin. If The Undertaker won the match, Austin would never receive another WWF Championship match ever again. If Austin were to win, then McMahon was willing to step away from the company he owned for good. Austin accepted.

==== Other feuds ====
Another predominant rivalry heading into the event was between Triple H and The Rock. At King of the Ring, Triple H interfered in The Undertaker's WWF Championship defense against The Rock and attacked The Rock, costing him the championship. On the June 28 episode of Raw Is War, The Rock attacked Triple H after Triple H offered Billy Gunn and Chyna to challenge Road Dogg and X-Pac to a match. On the July 5 episode of Raw Is War, The Rock defeated Triple H in a steel cage match. The Rock and Triple H developed a rivalry, leading to a strap match between the two at Fully Loaded.

On the July 19 episode of Raw Is War, Jeff Jarrett defeated Christian to retain the WWF Intercontinental Championship. After the match, Christian's The Brood partner Edge appeared and a brawl occurred between Jarrett and Edge. As a result, Jarrett challenged Edge to a match for the Intercontinental Championship at Fully Loaded. On July 24, Edge defeated Jarrett at a live event to win the title.

On the July 4 episode of Sunday Night Heat, D'Lo Brown attacked Mideon during a WWF European Championship defense against Al Snow, causing Snow to be disqualified. On the July 5 episode of Raw Is War, Mideon attacked Brown during a WWF Hardcore Championship match against Snow, costing Brown the match. On the July 18 episode of Sunday Night Heat, Mideon distracted Brown and spitted in his face during Brown's match against Gangrel. This allowed Gangrel to defeat Brown for the victory. This led to a European Championship match between Brown and Mideon at Fully Loaded.

At King of the Ring, Ken Shamrock lost his King of the Ring quarter-final match to Billy Gunn, when the referee stopped the match, due to Shamrock sustaining an injury at the hands of Steve Blackman in a match against Shane McMahon on the June 27 episode of Sunday Night Heat. On the June 28 episode of Raw Is War, Shamrock and Blackman wrestled in a No Holds Barred match, which ended when Blackman attacked him with a kendo stick. On the July 18 episode of Sunday Night Heat, Shamrock challenged Blackman to an Iron Circle match.

At King of the Ring, The Hardy Boyz (Matt Hardy and Jeff Hardy) defeated Edge and Christian to become the number one contenders for the WWF Tag Team Championship. On the July 5 episode of Raw Is War, Hardy Boyz defeated The Acolytes (Faarooq and Bradshaw) to win the Tag Team Championship. On the July 12 episode of Raw Is War, it was announced that Hardy Boyz would defend the titles against Acolytes in a rematch at Fully Loaded.

Billy Gunn won the 1999 King of the Ring tournament and issued an open challenge to all the wrestlers of WWF on the June 28 episode of Raw Is War. Triple H then urged Billy Gunn and Chyna to challenge D-Generation X's remaining members Road Dogg and X-Pac to a match. On the July 5 episode of Raw Is War, Road Dogg was arrested by the police as he was blamed by Billy Gunn and Chyna for vandalizing Chyna's car, but Chyna informed the police that it was not her car. On the July 12 episode of Raw Is War, Road Dogg and X-Pac challenged Billy Gunn and Chyna to a match with the winning team earning the rights to DX name at Fully Loaded.

At King of the Ring, Kane defeated Big Show in the quarter-final round of the King of the Ring tournament. Later that night, Big Show cost Kane, his semi-final round match against Billy Gunn. On the June 28 episode of Raw is War, Big Show cost Kane, a match against Hardcore Holly. On the July 5 episode of Raw Is War, Kane defeated Big Show and Holly in a Handicap match after help from The Undertaker. Big Show and Kane continued to interfere in each other's matches and attack each other, leading to a match between the two at Fully Loaded.

On the July 19 episode of Raw Is War, Big Boss Man attacked Al Snow with his nightstick when Snow requested him to hit him after Snow had gone mad after his Head was pierced by Prince Albert on the July 12 episode of Raw Is War. However, Boss Man continued to attack Snow with the nightstick, leading to a match between the two for Snow's WWF Hardcore Championship at Fully Loaded.

== Event ==
Other on-screen personnel
Role:	Name:
English commentators	Jim Ross
English commentators	Jerry Lawler
Spanish commentators	Hugo Savinovich
Spanish commentators	Savio Vega
Interviewers	Michael Cole
Interviewers	Kevin Kelly
Interviewers	Terry Taylor
Ring announcer	Howard Finkel
Referees	Mike Chioda
Referees	Earl Hebner
Referees	Jim Korderas
Referees	Tim White

Before the event aired live on pay-per-view, the pre-show Sunday Night Heat aired live featuring three matches. In the first match, Val Venis defeated Joey Abs by pinning him after a powerbomb. In the second match, The Godfather defeated Meat by pinning him after performing a Death Valley Driver, which he called the Pimp Drop. In the final match, Christian defeated Viscera by pinning Viscera with a roll-up after Christian's Brood teammate Gangrel attacked Viscera. At the end of the Sunday Night Heat broadcast, WWE Champion "Stone Cold" Steve Austin was set to do an interview regarding his match later in the evening. As he was making comments, he was attacked from behind by his opponent, The Undertaker. Austin was lacerated, giving him a disadvantage in the First Blood match.

=== Preliminary matches ===
The first match that aired live on pay-per-view was a standard wrestling match for the WWF Intercontinental Championship. Edge defended the title against Jeff Jarrett. After a back and forth action, Jarrett targeted Edge's legs and shoulder, injuring it and continued to dominate Jarrett, until Edge performed an Impaler on Jarrett and attempted to perform a spear, but Jarrett threw him outside the ring, where Gangrel attacked Edge as the lights went off. When the lights came back, Gangrel was shown laying down on the floor. Edge returned to the ring and performed a spear on Jarrett while Jarrett's valet Debra distracted both Edge and the referee. Debra was eventually thrown off the ring apron as Edge and Jarrett attacked each other. Gangrel interfered in the match and attacked Edge, allowing Jarrett to perform a Stroke to win the Intercontinental Championship.

In the second match, The Hardy Boyz (Matt Hardy and Jeff Hardy) teamed with their manager Michael Hayes to defend the WWF Tag Team Championship against The Acolytes (Faarooq and Bradshaw) in a Handicap match. The Hardy Boyz and the Acolytes started battling in the entrance way. The two teams made it to the ring where Hardy Boyz dominated the Acolytes through their high-flying moves until the Acolytes took control by using their strength and power. The Hardy Boyz controlled the Acolytes until Bradshaw performed a superplex on Matt and attempted to pin him, but Jeff hit Bradshaw with a cane. Jeff then tried to perform a high-flying move but Bradshaw performed a Clothesline from Hell on Jeff. Faarooq tossed the Hardy Boyz over the top rope and then dominated Hayes and finished him with a Double Powerbomb to win the tag team championship.

The third match was a standard wrestling match for the WWF European Championship. Mideon defended the title against D'Lo Brown. Brown dominated Mideon for the earlier part of the match by performing a clothesline and a baseball slide until Mideon attacked Brown and dominated him outside the ring by ramming him into the ring steps. The action returned to the ring where Mideon controlled the match. Brown eventually regained his control and performed a Low Down on Mideon to win the European Championship.

In the next match, Al Snow defended the WWF Hardcore Championship against Big Boss Man. Snow asked Boss Man in the entrance way to hit him with the nightstick but Bossman started attacking Head, which angered Snow and he started attacking Boss Man but was thrown into a closed steel trunk. The two started fighting each other and their action spilled to the backstage, where Snow and Boss Man hit each other with numerous objects and fought each other throughout the arena. Boss Man threw Snow into a gate and handcuffed him to the gate, where Boss Man hit him with a bottle and a metal rod and then pinned him to win the Hardcore Championship.

The fifth match was a standard wrestling match between Big Show and Kane. Hardcore Holly served as the special guest referee. Show started dominating the match as he performed a military press slam over the top rope, sending Kane outside the ring. Kane returned to the ring where Big Show continued to dominate him. Big Show performed a Sidewalk Slam on Kane and attempted to pin him but got a near-fall. Show attempted to perform an elbow drop, but Kane avoided the move and started dominating the match. He performed a flying clothesline and attempted to perform a chokeslam on Show, but Holly attacked Kane's knee, allowing Big Show to take advantage and he thus chokeslammed Kane and attempted a pinfall. Holly made a fast count and thus Big Show won the match. After the match, The Undertaker came to the ring and attacked Kane. As he returned to the backstage area, he was attacked by "Stone Cold" Steve Austin, whom he had attacked earlier on Sunday Night Heat. The Undertaker was lacerated by Austin, evening up the sides for their main event confrontation.

The next contest was an Iron Circle match. It was contested in a parking garage. The rules of the match were that the first wrestler to get out of the cars would be declared the winner. Ken Shamrock competed against Steve Blackman. Shamrock and Blackman entered the circle and started fighting each other. Blackman tried to use a chain and a tire iron, but he missed both. Shamrock used a trashcan and the same steel chain wrapped around his hand as weapons as the car's horns sounded. Shamrock then choked out Blackman with the chain to win.

=== Main event matches ===
The seventh match was a tag team match pitting Billy Gunn and Chyna against Road Dogg and X-Pac. The winning team would legally win the rights to the D-Generation X (DX) copyright. Chyna was hit with a dropkick into Billy Gunn by Road Dogg until Gunn was tagged in. Dogg and Gunn battled each other while Chyna continued her interference. X-Pac was tagged in, but he was dominated by Gunn. X-Pac tagged Dogg and entered the ring, but the referee did not see the tag and Dogg was sent outside the ring. X-Pac was the legal competitor and was dominated by Chyna and Gunn. Chyna started dominating X-Pac until X-Pac performed a clothesline on her. Dogg and X-Pac started dominating the match as Dogg threw Gunn out of the ring while X-Pac performed a bronco buster on Chyna. Gunn tried to perform a clothesline on X-Pac, but Chyna accidentally pulled X-Pac out of the way and was hit by Gunn. Dogg took advantage and performed a pumphandle drop on Gunn to win the rights to the DX name.

The final match on the undercard was a strap match between The Rock and Triple H, with the winner becoming the number one contender for the WWF Championship and earning the title shot at SummerSlam. The Rock and Triple H were both tied to a strap that connected both men. Both men used the leather strap to their advantage by attacking each other in the ring and outside the ring. Chyna eventually interfered in the match and distracted the referee, allowing The Rock to perform a Rock Bottom on Triple H and attempted to pin him, but Triple H choked him through the strap. However, The Rock performed a hip toss and a Samoan drop to keep his momentum. Triple H eventually took the strap off as he grabbed a chair, but he was hit with straps by The Rock. Chyna distracted the referee again, allowing Billy Gunn to interfere and attack The Rock with a club as Triple H got a near-fall. The Rock then performed a low blow and a People's Elbow on Triple H and attempted to pin him, but Gunn pulled him off. The Rock performed a Rock Bottom on Gunn, but as he turned around Triple H took advantage and performed a Pedigree on The Rock to win the match.

The main event was a First Blood match for the WWF Championship. "Stone Cold" Steve Austin defended the title against The Undertaker. The match stipulated that if The Undertaker won, Austin would never receive another shot at the WWF Championship ever again and if Austin won, WWF Chairman Vince McMahon would never appear on WWF television again. The match started when The Undertaker and Austin started battling each other in the entrance way and battled each other throughout the ringside area. The Undertaker then picked up a chair and tried to hit Austin with it. He attempted it four times, but he failed to hit it even a single time. Austin then threw The Undertaker into the steel steps, but The Undertaker did not bleed. Shane McMahon then interfered in the match and Austin hit him with a chair. Austin tried to hit The Undertaker with it, but The Undertaker avoided it. Austin then performed a Stone Cold Stunner on The Undertaker. Vince McMahon then interfered in the match and tried to attack Austin with his crutch, but Austin avoided it and attacked McMahon. The Undertaker proceeded to hit Austin with a chair in the head. X-Pac then interfered and kicked the chair into The Undertaker's head. Austin then picked up a television camera and hit The Undertaker with it. When The Undertaker rose to his feet, he was visibly bleeding. The two men continued to fight since the referee had been knocked out and unable to call for the bell. The Undertaker then tried to perform a Tombstone Piledriver on Austin, but the referee came to and noticed The Undertaker bleeding and called for the bell. The referee awarded the match to Austin and declared him the winner. As a result, Vince McMahon could no longer appear on WWF television. After the match, Austin nailed The Undertaker with a stunner. Afterwards, Triple H came out and attacked Austin. While Triple H was attacking Austin, The Rock came to save Austin and got revenge on Triple H from earlier in the night. While Triple H and The Rock brawled, The Undertaker nailed Austin with a chair, causing Austin to bleed profusely. This started a brawl between Austin and The Undertaker which caused every WWF official and Shane McMahon to try to stop them, but to no avail. Finally, both men stopped fighting and The Undertaker tried to leave, but Austin climbed through the ring and attacked The Undertaker in the aisle before they were pulled apart by officials. However, The Undertaker continued up the aisleway. While watching all this in the ring, it all started to set in that Vince McMahon could no longer appear on WWF television, then Austin came into the ring and shook hands with McMahon and gave him a goodbye Stone Cold Stunner with The Undertaker standing in the aisleway looking on.

== Aftermath ==
On the July 26 edition of Raw is War, The Undertaker avenged his loss at Fully Loaded by attacking X-Pac and Road Dogg in the backstage area. The Undertaker brought X-Pac to the ringside area to attack him more, causing X-Pac's tag team partner Kane to rescue him but he was attacked by Big Show. As a result, The Undertaker and Big Show formed a tag team. The Undertaker and Big Show started a rivalry with X-Pac and Kane. On the August 9 episode of Raw Is War, X-Pac and Kane defeated The Acolytes (Faarooq and Bradshaw) for the WWF Tag Team Championship. At SummerSlam, The Undertaker and Big Show defeated X-Pac and Kane to win the WWF Tag Team Championship.

After losing to "Stone Cold" Steve Austin at Fully Loaded, The Undertaker challenged him to a rematch on the August 2 episode of Raw Is War. Austin accepted the challenge, but Triple H, who had become the number one contender to Austin's WWF Championship at Fully Loaded, insisted that The Undertaker would not get the championship match, resulting in a brawl. On the August 9 episode of Raw Is War, Jesse Ventura returned to WWF after nine years. Triple H confronted Ventura, causing the WWF Commissioner Shawn Michaels to force Triple H to compete against Austin and The Undertaker in a triple threat match. However, Austin was found unconscious later that night. Michaels blamed Triple H for the attack and replaced Austin with Chyna and announced that Triple H's status as the number one contender would be on the line in the match. Chyna pinned Triple H and thus became the new number one contender for the WWF Championship. On the August 16 episode of Raw Is War, a returning Mankind helped Chyna in defeating Triple H to retain her status as the number one contender to the championship. After the match, he challenged her for that spot, but Chyna low blowed him and refused. However, Michaels forced Chyna into defending her spot against Mankind. Mankind defeated Chyna to become the number one contender until Triple H attacked him after the match. Shane McMahon announced that Mankind would defend his number one contender status against Triple H and appointed himself the special guest referee. Michaels made the match a Falls Count Anywhere No Holds Barred match and appointed himself the second referee. Mankind and Triple H both pinned each other. As a result, both men were declared contenders for the title and it was announced that Austin would defend the title against Mankind and Triple H in a triple threat match at SummerSlam. At SummerSlam, Mankind defeated Austin and Triple H to win the title.

== Reception ==
In 2016, Kevin Pantoja of 411Mania gave the event a rating of 5.5 [Not So Good], stating, "This was a very middle of the pack show. The best things on it were good at best and they opened [and] closed the show. Outside of the first two and last two matches, everything on this show is an easy skip, making it a hard show to recommend despite the big time main event."

== Results ==
No.	Results	Stipulations	Times
1^{H}	Val Venis defeated Joey Abs (with Rodney and Pete Gas)	Singles match	3:16
2^{H}	The Godfather defeated Meat (with Jacqueline and Terri Runnels)	Singles match	2:06
3^{H}	Christian defeated Viscera	Singles match	2:43
4	Jeff Jarrett (with Debra) defeated Edge (c)	Singles match for the WWF Intercontinental Championship	13:23
5	The Acolytes (Faarooq and Bradshaw) defeated The Hardy Boyz (Matt Hardy and Jeff Hardy) (c) and Michael Hayes	3-on-2 Acolyte Rules match for the WWF Tag Team Championship	9:35
6	D'Lo Brown defeated Mideon (c)	Singles match for the WWF European Championship	7:12
7	Big Boss Man defeated Al Snow (c)	Hardcore match for the WWF Hardcore Championship	10:13
8	Big Show defeated Kane	Singles match Hardcore Holly was the special guest referee.	8:13
9	Ken Shamrock defeated Steve Blackman	Iron Circle match	4:19
10	Road Dogg and X-Pac defeated Billy Gunn and Chyna	Tag team match for the rights to D-Generation X	11:44
11	Triple H (with Billy Gunn and Chyna) defeated The Rock	Fully Loaded Strap match to determine the #1 contender to the WWF Championship at SummerSlam	19:23
12	"Stone Cold" Steve Austin (c) defeated The Undertaker by making Undertaker bleed first	First Blood match for the WWF Championship; Since The Undertaker lost, Vince McMahon could no longer appear on WWF television. Had Austin lost, he would have never been able to challenge for the championship again.	15:58
(c) / – the champion(s) heading into the match; H / – the match was broadcast prior to the pay-per-view on Sunday Night Heat
