= Sable (wrestler) =

American professional wrestler and model (born 1967)

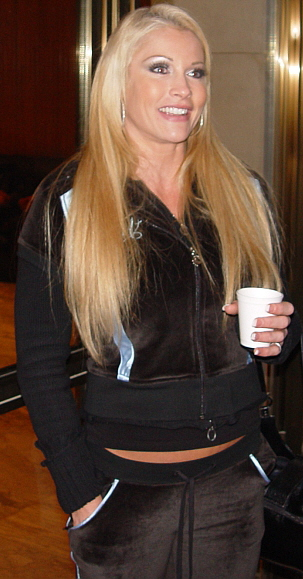
- Sable in 2003

Personal information
- Born: Rena Marlette Greek; August 8, 1967 (age 59) Jacksonville, Florida, U.S.
- Spouses: Wayne Richardson (m. 1987; died 1991) Marc Mero (m. 1994; div. 2004) Brock Lesnar (m. 2006)
- Children: 3

Professional wrestling career
- Ring name: Sable
- Billed height: 5 ft 8 in (173 cm)
- Billed weight: 120 lb (54 kg)
- Billed from: Jacksonville, Florida
- Trained by: Marc Mero
- Debut: March 31, 1996
- Retired: August 10, 2004

Rena Marlette Lesnar (née Greek, formerly Mero; born August 8, 1967), better known as Sable, is an American retired model, actress, and retired professional wrestler. She is best known for her tenures in World Wrestling Entertainment (WWE; formerly WWF) from 1996 to 1999, and again from 2003 to 2004.

Sable gained popularity during the beginnings of the Attitude Era, feuding with Luna Vachon and Jacqueline, Sable became the second WWF Women's Champion after the title was reinstated into the company. After leaving the company in 1999, she filed a $110 million lawsuit against them, citing allegations of sexual harassment. She later returned to WWE and was put into a feud with Torrie Wilson, and another storyline as Vince McMahon's personal trainer.

Outside wrestling, she is considered to be a sex symbol and has been featured on the cover of Playboy. The April 1999 issue of the magazine with her on the cover was one of the highest selling issues in Playboy history. She has guest starred on several television series, including Pacific Blue, and appeared in the film Corky Romano.

== Early life ==
Rena Greek was born in Jacksonville, Florida. She was active in her youth and was interested in activities such as gymnastics, horseback riding, and softball. After winning her first beauty pageant when she was twelve, she eventually became a model in 1990, working with companies such as L'Oréal, Pepsi, and Guess?.

== Professional wrestling career ==
=== World Wrestling Federation (1996–1999) ===
==== Debut and feud with Marc Mero (1996–1998) ====
She made her World Wrestling Federation debut as Sable at WrestleMania XII in March 1996, escorting Hunter Hearst Helmsley to the ring as he took on the returning Ultimate Warrior. Sable's first major angle involved her then real-life husband, who debuted at WrestleMania XII as "Wildman" Marc Mero. The storyline started when Marc Mero witnessed Sable being mistreated by Helmsley backstage, so Mero attacked Helmsley and took Sable as his manager. She remained Mero's manager until his injury in February 1997, with Sable becoming wildly popular on her own whilst Mero was off TV. When Marc Mero returned in October 1997, his gimmick transitioned. Dubbing himself "Marvelous" Marc Mero, a jealous Mero refused to let Sable get any of the spotlight, and mistreated her. The duo entered into a feud with Luna Vachon and The Artist Formerly Known as Goldust, which climaxed in a match at WrestleMania XIV in March 1998. Sable delivered a superkick to Goldust and executed a "Sable Bomb", a release powerbomb, on Luna. She also delivered a TKO and pinned Luna to finish the match, with the crowd chanting Sable's name in the background. At the following pay-per-view event, Unforgiven in April 1998, Sable lost to Luna in an Evening Gown match after being distracted by Marc Mero.

After Marc's interference at Unforgiven, Sable came to the ring and challenged Marc to a match. Sable then kicked him in the groin and delivered a Sable Bomb to get revenge. Sable eventually broke away from "Marvelous" Marc Mero, who debuted Jacqueline as his new manager, resulting in a storyline feud between the two women. The two met in a bikini contest in July 1998 at Fully Loaded. Sable, only wearing impressions of hands painted on her exposed breasts, won the contest after receiving the most cheers from the audience. The next night on Raw however, Vince McMahon disqualified Sable from the previous night's contest since she did not actually wear a bikini, and the trophy was then awarded to Jacqueline. In response, Sable gave McMahon the double finger. At SummerSlam, Sable and her mystery partner, federation newcomer Edge, defeated Marc Mero and Jacqueline in a mixed tag team match.

==== Women's Champion (1998–1999) ====
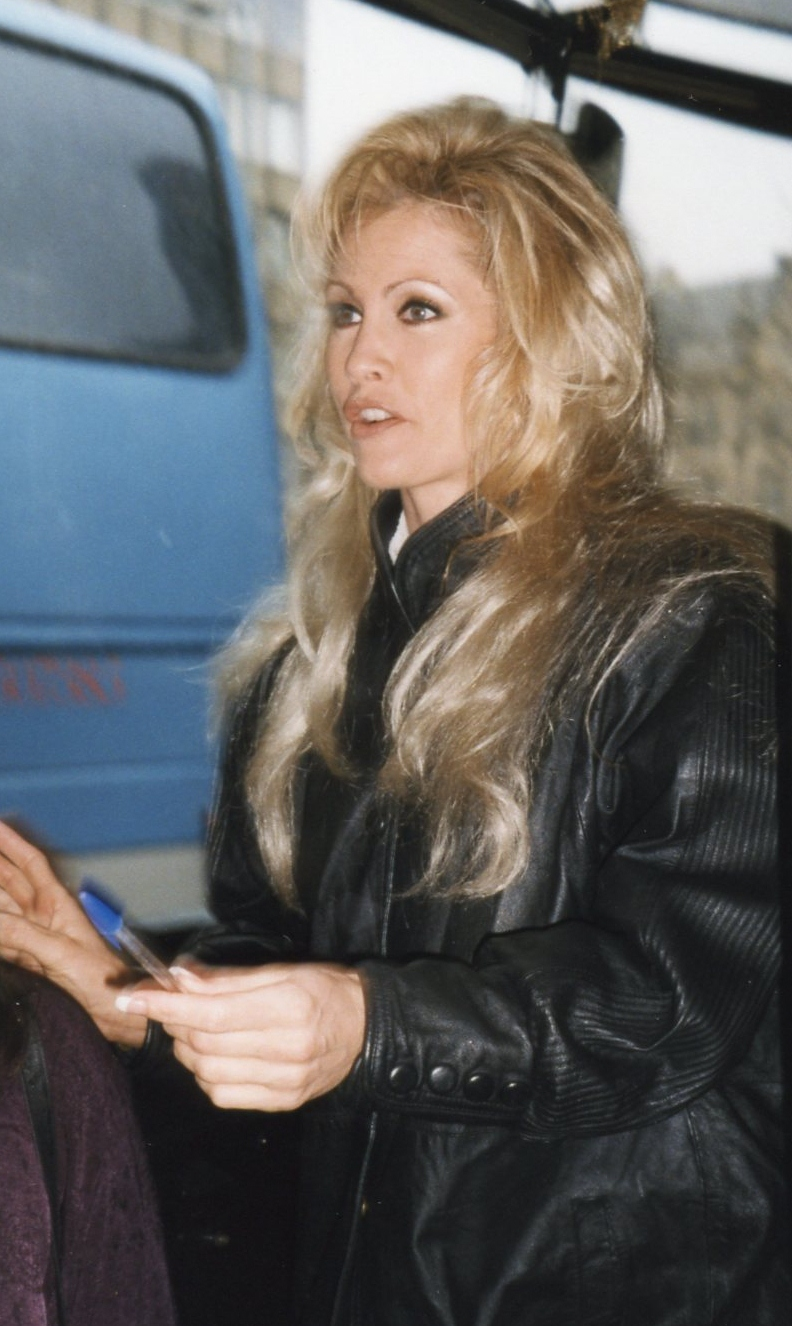
Sable during a WWF tour in England in April 1998

Sable and Jacqueline faced off for the newly reinstated WWF Women's Title on the edition of September 21, 1998, of Raw. Jacqueline claimed the title after Marc Mero interfered. On November 15, 1998, at Survivor Series, she dropped the title to Sable, who won after powerbombing both Marc and Jacqueline during the match. During this time, Rena appeared on an episode of the USA Network show Pacific Blue. Sable then briefly entered a storyline where she was forced to play a subservient role to Vince and Shane McMahon, but the storyline was cut short.

In December 1998, as part of a new storyline, Sable was attacked by a masked villainess named Spider Lady, who turned out to be Luna Vachon. Sable defeated Luna in a Strap match at the Royal Rumble after an assist from a planted female Sable fan, WWF newcomer Tori. Tori's debut signified a change in Sable's persona. After the Rumble, Sable was the cover girl for the April 1999 issue of Playboy, one of the highest selling issues of Playboy ever. Surrounding the release of the issue, the Sable character turned heel by "going Hollywood" and having an inflated ego. She debuted a new catchphrase: "This is for all the women who want to be me and all the men who come to see me" and a dance move called "the grind." Rarely defending her title, Sable continually berated her fan Tori, leading to a feud and a match at WrestleMania XV. During the contest, Nicole Bass debuted as Sable's bodyguard and helped her win the match. Sable also feuded with Luna Vachon, who had turned face.

Sable went on with Bass making Bass do all of her dirty work. Sable continued to hold the championship for almost six months, but on May 10, 1999, Debra won the Women's Championship from Sable in an Evening Gown match. Normally in an Evening Gown match, the winner is the woman who forcibly removes her opponent's dress, which Sable did. As part of the storyline, WWF Commissioner Shawn Michaels, however, ruled that the woman who had lost her dress was the winner, making Debra the new Women's Champion. Off-screen, Sable was in a dispute with the WWF, which is why she was stripped of the title on-screen. Sable at this time was also very unpopular backstage, to the extent that Sean Waltman has since admitted to playing a nasty practical joke on her last day with the WWF.

=== Post–WWF (1999–2002) ===
In June 1999, Sable quit the WWF and filed a $110 million lawsuit against the company, citing allegations of sexual harassment and unsafe working conditions. She claims to have filed the lawsuit after refusing to go topless. During the lawsuit, Vince McMahon counter-sued her over control of the stagename "Sable". Sable reduced the amount she was seeking in damages, and they eventually settled out of court in August 1999. Sable used her real name for her appearance in the September 1999 issue of Playboy. She was the first woman in history to be given two Playboy covers in the same year. After her WWF exit, she made an on-camera appearance as an audience member on World Championship Wrestling's Monday Nitro on June 14, 1999.

During this time, she made appearances on The Howard Stern Show and Late Night with Conan O'Brien. She also made appearances on television shows such as Relic Hunter and First Wave and in the films Corky Romano as a female bouncer and Ariana's Quest. She released her autobiography, entitled Undefeated in August 2000. She also released a comic book entitled The 10th Muse starring herself as a superhero. In May 2001, she was given an advice column on CompuServe. On November 13 and 14, 2001, she appeared as the on-camera "CEO" of the newly formed Xcitement Wrestling Federation (XWF), but these were her only appearances with the company.

=== Return to World Wrestling Entertainment (2003–2004) ===
==== Relationship with Vince McMahon (2003) ====
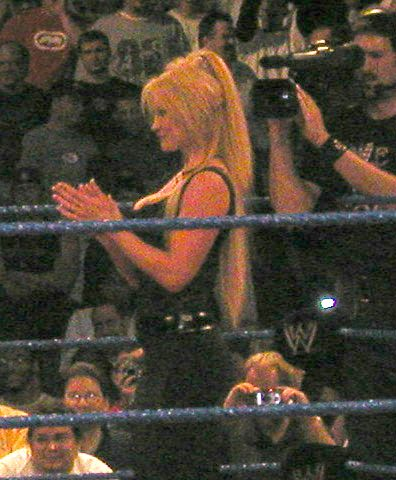
Sable in 2003

Rena Mero returned to the WWF, which is now known as World Wrestling Entertainment (WWE) on April 3, 2003, episode of SmackDown!, reprising her role as Sable. Sable continued portraying a villainess and spent several months in a storyline with new Playboy cover girl Torrie Wilson. During their angle, the evil Sable followed Wilson down to her matches, talked with her backstage, and on one occasion, she left Wilson in a tag match alone to fend for herself. Sable eventually challenged Wilson to a showdown bikini contest at Judgment Day. After Sable got the bigger applause, Wilson removed her underwear to reveal an even smaller bikini underneath, and Special Guest Referee Tazz declared Wilson the winner. After the match, Wilson went up to Sable and kissed her before exiting the ring. Sable then had an altercation with the guest judge Tazz, dumping water on him on the following edition of SmackDown!, as a means of gaining revenge for declaring Wilson the winner.

Sable then feuded with Stephanie McMahon in a storyline in which she was Vince McMahon's mistress. Vince appointed Sable as Stephanie's personal assistant against Stephanie's will, sparking the feud between the duo. During the feud, they competed in several catfights, a food fight, a parking lot brawl in which Sable's bra was ripped off, revealing both her breasts on live television, and a match in which Sable smacked a clipboard over Stephanie's head. At Vengeance, Sable defeated Stephanie after interference by her new ally, A-Train. At SummerSlam, Sable accompanied A-Train in his match against The Undertaker, which he lost. After the match, The Undertaker held Sable so that Stephanie could use a Spear attack on her. After SummerSlam, Vince and Sable focused on getting rid of Stephanie for good, so Vince made an "I Quit" match at No Mercy. During the match, Sable slapped Stephanie and was involved in a scuffle with Linda McMahon.

==== Various storylines (2004) ====
Sable briefly became a face again when she appeared on the cover of Playboy magazine (March 2004 issue) for the third time in her career. On the cover, she appeared with fellow diva Torrie Wilson, making them the first WWE Divas to pose in Playboy together. Surrounding the release of the cover, the duo feuded with Raw divas Stacy Keibler and Miss Jackie, even though all four women were faces at the time. The two teams squared off at WrestleMania XX in an Interpromotional Tag Team Evening Gown match, but the divas started the match in their underwear, making it more of a lingerie match. Sable and Wilson were victorious. The change was rumored to have occurred because Sable had suffered damage to her breast implants while weightlifting.

Following WrestleMania XX, Sable quickly turned heel again and engaged in another short feud with Torrie Wilson. The feud culminated at The Great American Bash, where Sable defeated Wilson despite the referee not noticing that one of Wilson's shoulders were not down. On the edition of July 1 of SmackDown, Sable was defeated by Wilson in a rematch. In the July 22, 2004, episode of SmackDown! she competed in a Fatal-4-Way lingerie match, against Wilson, Dawn Marie, and Miss Jackie; but Kurt Angle (in his kayfabe role as WWE’s General Manager) fired all four of them, however all four were re-signed after Angle was fired as General Manager of SmackDown! by Vince McMahon. Sable's final appearance in WWE was on the August 5, 2004, episode of SmackDown! when she, Marie, and Wilson accompanied Eddie Guerrero to the ring in his lowrider, mocking Angle, turning face again. On August 10, 2004, WWE's official website announced that Sable and WWE had parted ways, this time on good terms. Lesnar claimed that she left the company to spend more time with her family.

=== New Japan Pro-Wrestling (2006–2007) ===
She made her debut for New Japan Pro-Wrestling on January 4, 2006, at Toukon Shidou Chapter 1, along with Brock Lesnar as special guests, and continued to accompany Lesnar until late June 2007. Sable and Lesnar later departed from the company after Lesnar battled WWE in a lawsuit.

== Other media ==
=== Playboy and video games ===
Sable made her video game debut in the WWE game WWF Attitude, and appears in WWE SmackDown! Here Comes the Pain and WWE SmackDown! vs. Raw. Her appearance in the Game Boy Color version of WWF Attitude made her the first playable female wrestler in a handheld WWF game, and the only one until the release of WWE Smackdown! vs. Raw 2006 for the Sony PSP. She also appeared in the April 1999, September 1999, and March 2004 issues of Playboy, the latter with Torrie Wilson.

=== Filmography ===
Film
Year	Film	Role	Notes
2001	Corky Romano	Female Bouncer	Film debut
2002	Ariana's Quest	Ariana	
2003	The Final Victim	Julia Grant	
2003	Slaves of the Realm	Shira	Alternative title: Sins of the Realm
Television
Year	Title	Role	Notes
1998	Pacific Blue	Brenda Macy	Episode: "Heat in the Hole"
1999	First Wave	Lucas	Episode: "Target 117"
2000	Relic Hunter	Elizabeth Rukeyser	Episode: "Nine Lives"
2002	BUZZ	Herself	Episode: Unknown
Music videos
Year	Title	Role	Artist
2002	Breath	Girlfriend	Cledus T. Judd

== Personal life ==
Rena married Wayne W. Richardson in 1987. They had a daughter named Mariah, and remained married until Richardson died in a drunk driving incident in 1991. She met her second husband, professional wrestler and former boxer Marc Mero, in 1993. After marrying Mero in 1994, she broke into the wrestling business through WWE. Before the couple divorced in 2004, Greek began dating professional wrestler Brock Lesnar, to whom she became engaged later that year. They were married on May 6, 2006. They have two sons.

== Championships and accomplishments ==
- World Wrestling Federation
  - WWF Women's Championship (1 time)
  - Slammy Award (2 time)
    - Dressed to Kill (1997)
    - Miss Slammy (1997)
  - Milton Bradley Karate Fighters Holiday Tournament Champion (December 16, 1996)

== Notes ==
- Kevin Iole (May 14, 2007). "The Big Debut". Yahoo! Sports.
