= SummerSlam (1999) =

World Wrestling Federation pay-per-view event

- Promotional poster featuring "Stone Cold" Steve Austin
- Promotion: World Wrestling Federation
- Date: August 22, 1999
- City: Minneapolis, Minnesota
- Venue: Target Center
- Attendance: 17,370
- Buy rate: 600,000
- Tagline: An Out of Body Experience

Pay-per-view chronology
← Previous; Fully Loaded	Next → Unforgiven

SummerSlam chronology
← Previous; 1998	Next → 2000

The 1999 SummerSlam was a professional wrestling pay-per-view (PPV) event produced by the World Wrestling Federation (WWF, renamed WWE in 2002). It was the 12th annual SummerSlam and took place on August 22, 1999, at the Target Center in Minneapolis, Minnesota. Nine matches were contested at the event. In the main event, Mankind defeated previous champion "Stone Cold" Steve Austin and Triple H in a triple threat match to win the WWF Championship which had Jesse Ventura as the special guest referee.

== Production ==
=== Background ===
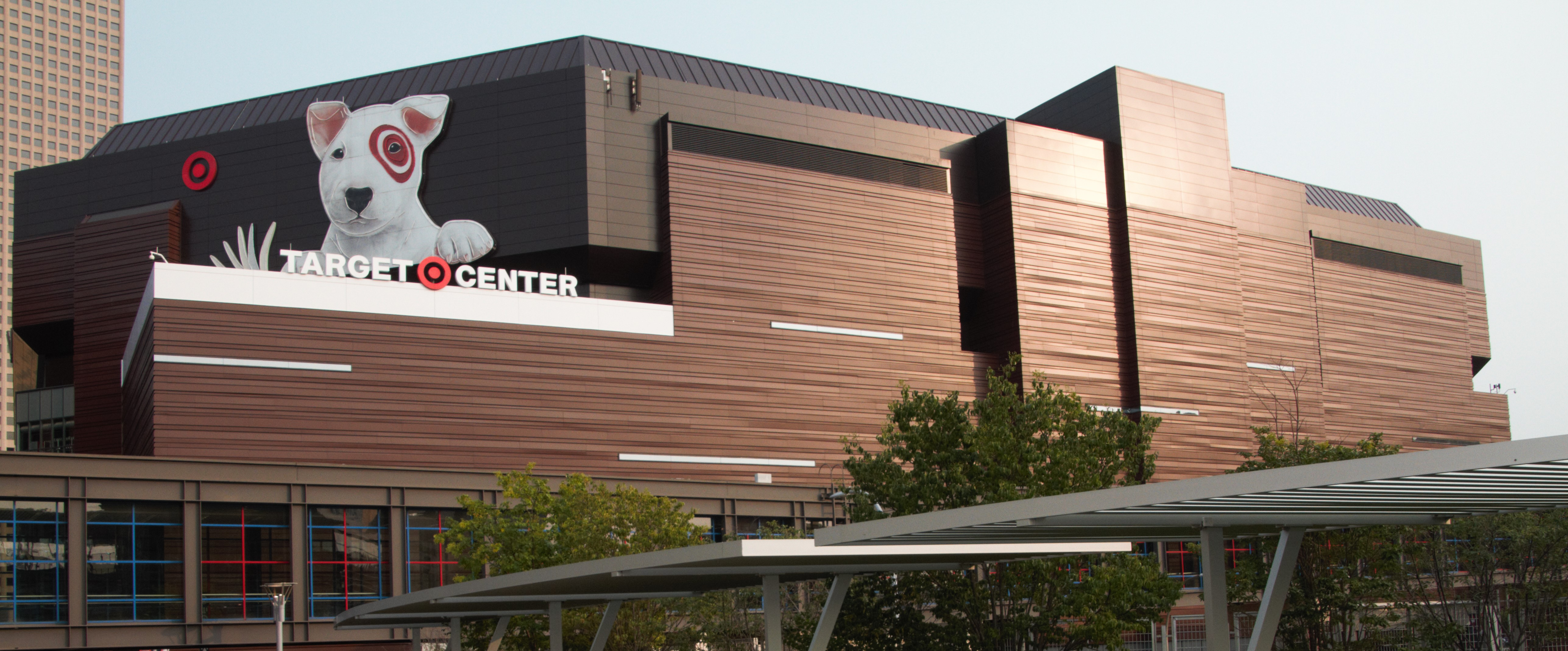
The 12th annual SummerSlam was held at the Target Center in Minneapolis, Minnesota.

SummerSlam is an annual professional wrestling pay-per-view (PPV) event produced every August by the World Wrestling Federation (WWF, renamed WWE in 2002) since 1988. Dubbed "The Biggest Party of the Summer", it is one of the promotion's original four PPVs, along with WrestleMania, Royal Rumble, and Survivor Series, referred to as the "Big Four", and was considered one of the "Big Five" PPVs with the addition of King of the Ring in 1993. It has since become considered the WWF's second biggest event of the year behind WrestleMania. The 12th SummerSlam was scheduled to be held on August 22, 1999, at the Target Center in Minneapolis, Minnesota.

=== Storylines ===
Other on-screen personnel
Role:	Name:
English commentators	Jim Ross
English commentators	Jerry Lawler
English commentators	Road Dogg (Al Snow vs. Big Boss Man)
Spanish commentators	Carlos Cabrera
Spanish commentators	Hugo Savinovich
Interviewers	Michael Cole
Interviewers	Kevin Kelly
Ring announcer	Howard Finkel
Referees	Mike Chioda
Referees	Earl Hebner
Referees	Jim Korderas
Referees	Tim White
Referees	Teddy Long
Referees	Chad Patton

The main feud heading into SummerSlam was between "Stone Cold" Steve Austin, Triple H, and Mankind over the WWF Championship. The previous month at Fully Loaded, Austin retained the WWF Championship by defeating The Undertaker in a First blood match when X-Pac interfered, allowing Austin to hit Undertaker with a television camera. Also at Fully Loaded, Triple H defeated The Rock in a Strap match to become the number one contender for the WWF Championship, thanks to the help of Billy Gunn and Chyna. In subsequent weeks, Triple H stated that he had been studying Austin for months to figure out how to beat him.

On the August 9 episode of Raw is War, it was revealed that Minnesota governor as well as fellow WWF legend Jesse "The Body" Ventura would be the special guest referee for the main event at SummerSlam. When Triple H came out and got in Ventura's face, WWF Commissioner Shawn Michaels set up a match between Austin, Triple H and Undertaker. When Austin was found mysteriously attacked in a stairwell, Michaels accused Triple H of being the attacker but Triple H denied it. Michaels then set up a Triple threat falls count anywhere match with the title of number one contender on the line between Triple H, Undertaker and Chyna. Austin returned to the arena later that night and hit Triple H with a chair, then put Chyna on top allowing her to win the match and become number one contender.

The following week, Triple H challenged Chyna to a match with her number one contender status on the line which Chyna accepted. Chyna again won the match after Mankind returned from a knee injury and attacked Triple H. Mankind then challenged Chyna for her number one contender status but Chyna refused to accept and low blowed Mankind, Michaels overruled Chyna and made the match. Mankind later defeated Chyna to become number one contender and brawled with Triple H after the match. Shane McMahon stated as owner of the WWF he was booking a match between Mankind and Triple H to determine the undisputed number one contender and was appointing himself referee. Michaels agreed to the match but made it a falls count anywhere match and named himself as the second referee. When Mankind and Triple H covered each other, Michaels and Shane both counted to three but they argued over who had won the match. Ring announcer Tony Chimel announced that both men are winners and that there would be a Triple Threat match at SummerSlam.

Another rivalry heading into SummerSlam was between Test and Shane McMahon. In July before Fully Loaded, Shane and the Mean Street Posse had started a feud with Test because of his relationship with Stephanie McMahon whom Shane feels was dating "beneath the family standards". Over the following weeks, Test had faced Posse member Joey Abs whom Shane had set up on a date with Stephanie. On the July 12 episode of Raw is War, Test wrestled the Posse in a Gauntlet match but it ended in no contest when Shane interfered. When the Posse attempted to break Test's ankle, Stephanie came out and grabbed her brother from behind. Thinking that it was a referee, Shane backhand elbowed his sister and knocked her out. The following two weeks, Stephanie rejected Joey Abs and demanded that her brother and his friends stay out of her life. On the August 15 episode of Sunday Night Heat, Shane challenged Test to a "Love her or Leave her" Greenwich Street Fight at SummerSlam. If Shane won Test and Stephanie could no longer see each other but if Test won Shane would give his blessing to them. Test agreed and accepted the challenge.

The third rivalry heading into SummerSlam was between the teams of X-Pac and Kane against The Undertaker and Big Show for the WWF Tag Team Championship. After X-Pac interfered in Undertaker's first blood match with "Stone Cold" Steve Austin at Fully Loaded, Undertaker blamed X-Pac for costing him the WWF Championship and attacked him the next night on Raw is War. Kane came to his partner's rescue and brawled with his brother until Big Show (whom Kane lost to at Fully Loaded) ran out to the ring and joined Undertaker in putting a beating on both of them. Then Undertaker and Big Show shook hands and formed an alliance. Two weeks later, Kane and X-Pac defeated the Acolytes to win the WWF Tag Team Championship. Road Dogg came out to celebrate with them however all three were attacked by Big Show and Undertaker leading to a WWF Tag Team Championship match between the two teams at SummerSlam.

The fourth rivalry heading into SummerSlam was between The Rock and Billy Gunn. At Fully Loaded, Rock lost to Triple H in a strap match after Gunn along with Chyna interfered and prevented Rock from pinning Triple H thus costing Rock the number one contender status for the WWF Championship. The next night on Raw is War, Chyna dared Rock to come out and repeat what he had said about her backstage to her face. When Rock came out, Gunn attacked Rock from behind with a club and he and Chyna double teamed him in the ring with Triple H looking on. Rock got up from the assault and challenged them both to a handicap match which he later won when he pinned Gunn after the people's elbow. The following week, it was announced that Rock and Gunn would face off in a match at SummerSlam.

== Reception ==
In 2014, Dylan Diot of 411Mania gave the event a rating of 7.5 [Good], stating, "This is one of the more underrated editions of SummerSlam. [I] was pleasantly surprised by just how much I enjoyed the show. The wrestling was consistent with plenty of good performances across the board. That Shane McMahon/Test match is sensational and it should have helped launch Test as a major star and it showed that Shane McMahon is actually a capable in ring performer. They kept the overbooking, swerves, and nonsensical booking to a minimum and it resulted in exciting matches and a great atmosphere. Go out of your way to check this out, it really is an underrated gem of a show." The event was rated as the third best pay-per-view of 1999 by YouTube wrestling channel Cultaholic Wrestling in their ranking of every 1999 PPV ranked from worst to best.

== Aftermath ==
After Triple H attacked "Stone Cold" after the match with steel chair shots to his legs and knee, Austin took time off to rehab from the injury but vowed to get revenge on Triple H. The next night on Raw is War, Triple H bragged about crippling Austin and challenged Mankind to a match for the WWF Championship. With Shane McMahon as guest referee, Triple H defeated Mankind after a pedigree to win his first WWF Championship.

Mankind later formed an alliance with The Rock and they became known as The Rock 'n' Sock Connection. On the August 30 episode of Raw is War, they defeated Undertaker and Big Show to win the WWF Tag Team Championship. On the September 9 episode of SmackDown!, they lost the titles back to Undertaker and Big Show in a buried alive tag team match after Triple H interfered and hit Big Show with a slegehammer before he helped to bury Mankind. Austin returned and got revenge on Triple H by attacking him and throwing him into an ambulance before ramming it with an 18 wheeler truck.

On the September 13 episode of Raw is War, Triple H had Austin arrested for aggravated assault and demanded that Linda McMahon put Austin at the bottom level of the ladder. Linda refused and Triple H began to accost her until Vince McMahon came to his wife's aid. Vince stated that he wouldn't get involved in WWF business but it was personal between him and Triple H. As he challenged him, Austin returned and attacked Triple H but lost a WWF title match to him when he punched referee Earl Hebner getting disqualified in the process. On the September 16 episode of SmackDown!, Triple H had been ordered into a title defense of the WWF Championship. He picked Shane as the referee and picked Vince McMahon as his opponent. Vince won the match and the title when Austin attacked Triple H with a stunner.

On the September 20 episode of Raw is War, Vince vacated the WWF Championship as he was prohibited from taking part in the company's day to day business due to the Fully Loaded contract he signed. Austin stated that he would reinstate him back in the WWF if he grants him his title shot. Vince accepted and stated that Austin would meet the winner of the six pack challenge match for the vacant WWF Championship at Unforgiven. He then announced that the vacant slot is given to Triple H and Austin would be the enforcer for the match.

At Unforgiven, Triple H regained the WWF Championship after winning the six pack challenge match when he pinned Rock after a pedigree and Austin made the count.

Ken Shamrock would enter into a feud with the debuting Chris Jericho after Jericho launched numerous insults at him, then Jericho employed the returning Curtis Hughes as his bodyguard (similar to his gimmick in WCW when he had a bodyguard named "Ralphus").

The feud between Test and Shane McMahon continued as the next night on Raw is War, Test came to the ring to propose to Stephanie McMahon but before she would accept they were interrupted by Shane who stated that their relationship would continue "Over my dead body!" Stephanie scolded her brother asking him why he would take away something away from her that made her so happy. She then told Test that she loved him but said she just needed sometime to comtemplate it and walked away beaming.

On the August 26 premiere episode of SmackDown!, Test again proposed to Stephanie and she finally accepted. As they celebrated their engagement with a kiss, Shane and the Mean Street Posse hit the ring and attacked Test until he was saved by Mankind. Later Test and Stephanie announced their wedding date would be on the October 11 episode of Raw is War. As they shared the news with the fans and with Pat Patterson, Gerald Brsico and Linda McMahon in the ring with them, The Posse who were now with Terri Runnels again interrupted and Shane came out and ended the feud by calling off the Posse and gave his blessing for Test and Stephanie's relationship asking Test to always treat Stephanie right. The wedding would be postponed after Stephanie suffered a concussion due to being hit by a trashcan thrown by the British Bulldog at Rebellion.

== Results ==
No.	Results	Stipulations	Times
1	Jeff Jarrett (with Debra) defeated D'Lo Brown (c)	Singles match for the WWF Intercontinental Championship and WWF European Championship	7:27
2	The Acolytes (Faarooq and Bradshaw) won by last eliminating The Holly Cousins (Hardcore Holly and Crash Holly)	Tag team turmoil match to determine #1 contenders to the WWF Tag Team Championship	16:13
3	Al Snow defeated Big Boss Man (c)	Hardcore match for the WWF Hardcore Championship	7:27
4	Ivory (c) defeated Tori	Singles match for the WWF Women's Championship	4:08
5	Ken Shamrock defeated Steve Blackman	Lion's Den Weapons match	9:06
6	Test defeated Shane McMahon	Greenwich Street Fight; Since Shane lost, he was forced to give his blessing to the relationship between Test and Stephanie McMahon. Had Test lost, he and Stephanie would have been forced to break up and never see each other again.	12:04
7	The Unholy Alliance (Big Show and The Undertaker) (with Paul Bearer) defeated Kane and X-Pac (c)	Tag team match for the WWF Tag Team Championship	12:01
8	The Rock defeated Billy Gunn	Kiss My Ass match	10:12
9	Mankind defeated "Stone Cold" Steve Austin (c) and Triple H (with Chyna)	Triple threat match for the WWF Championship; Jesse Ventura was the special guest referee.	16:23
(c) / – the champion(s) heading into the match

Tag team turmoil

Draw	Wrestler	Order	Eliminated by
1	Edge and Christian	4	The Acolytes
2	The New Brood (Jeff Hardy and Matt Hardy) (with Gangrel)	1	Edge and Christian
3	Mideon and Viscera	2	Edge and Christian
4	Droz and Prince Albert	3	Edge and Christian
5	The Acolytes (Faarooq and Bradshaw)		Winners
6	The Holly Cousins (Hardcore Holly and Crash Holly)	5	The Acolytes
