= WWF Invasion =

2001 World Wrestling Federation pay-per-view event

Invasion
- Promotional poster featuring the faces of Shane and Vince McMahon morphing together
- Promotion: World Wrestling Federation
- Date: July 22, 2001
- City: Cleveland, Ohio
- Venue: Gund Arena
- Attendance: 17,876
- Buy rate: 775,000

Pay-per-view chronology
← Previous; King of the Ring	Next → SummerSlam

Invasion (also stylized as InVasion) was a 2001 professional wrestling pay-per-view (PPV) event produced by the World Wrestling Federation (WWF, now WWE). It took place on July 22, 2001, at the Gund Arena in Cleveland, Ohio. The event had been promoted as the fourth Fully Loaded at the preceding King of the Ring event, but WWF changed it to Invasion in May. Invasion was the first pay-per-view to feature the ongoing Invasion storyline, which featured wrestlers from the WWF taking on The Coalition, a combined force of wrestlers from the former World Championship Wrestling (WCW) and Extreme Championship Wrestling (ECW) promotions, later known as The Alliance.

The main event, dubbed the "Inaugural Brawl", was a five-on-five tag team match between Team WWF ("Stone Cold" Steve Austin, Kurt Angle, Chris Jericho, Kane, and The Undertaker) and Team WCW/ECW (Diamond Dallas Page, Booker T, Rhyno, Bubba Ray Dudley, and D-Von Dudley), which Team WCW/ECW won after Austin betrayed Team WWF. The other main match was a singles match for the WWF Hardcore Championship between Rob Van Dam and Jeff Hardy, which Van Dam won. With a buyrate of 775,000, the event is the highest-grossing non-WrestleMania pay-per-view in WWE history.

Following the conclusion of the storyline, instead of bringing back Fully Loaded, the event's July slot was given to Vengeance in 2002 when Armageddon returned that year; Vengeance temporarily replaced Armageddon in December 2001 due to the September 11 attacks. The Invasion name was set to return in October 2025 for an event between WWE's NXT brand and partner promotion Total Nonstop Action Wrestling (TNA), but due to controversy with Israel and the October 7 attacks in 2023, the event was changed to NXT vs. TNA Showdown.

== Production ==
=== Background ===
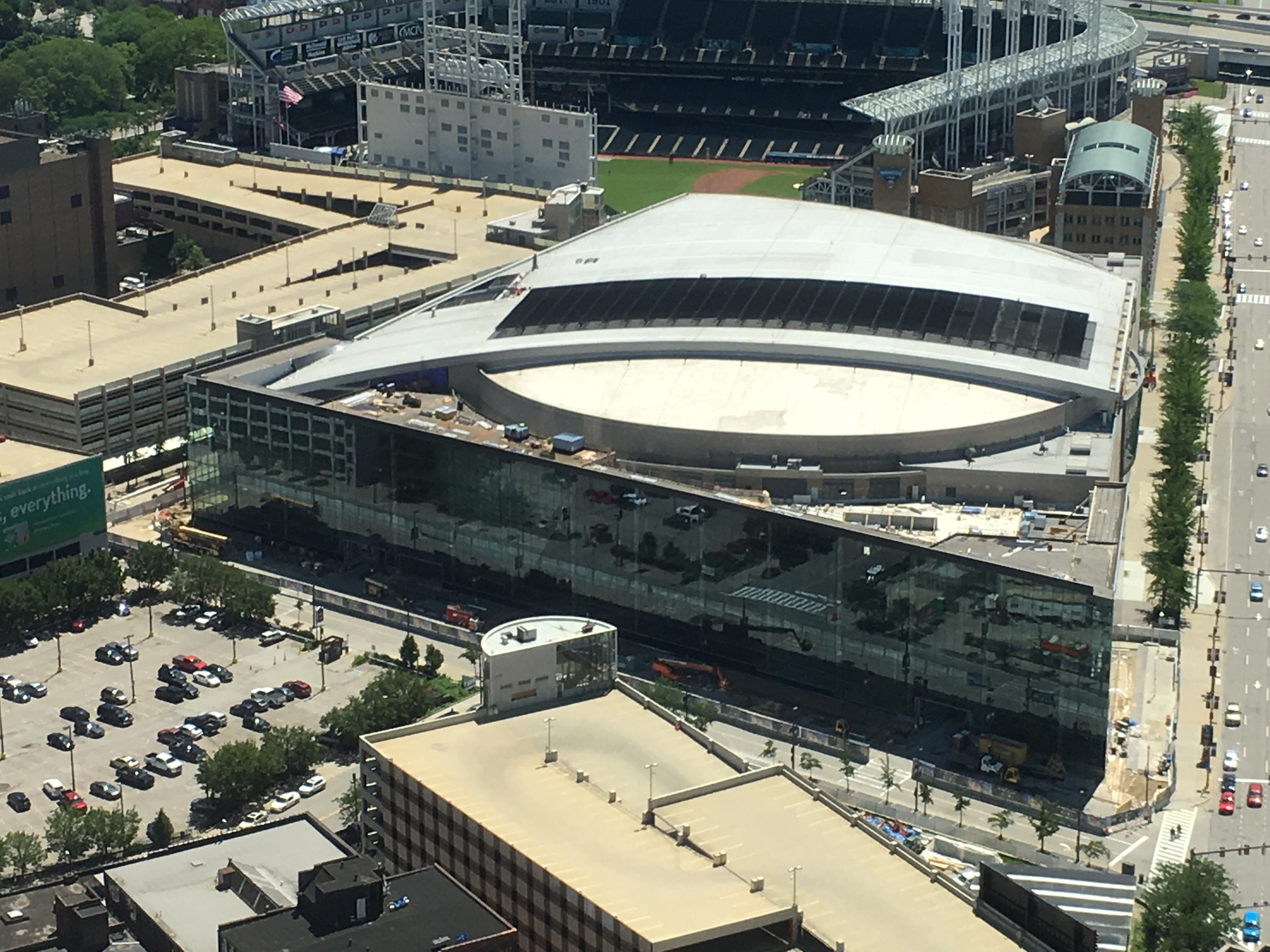
The event was held at the Rocket Mortgage FieldHouse in Cleveland, Ohio (pictured in 2019), then known as the Gund Arena.

From 1998 to 2000, the World Wrestling Federation (WWF, now WWE) held a professional wrestling pay-per-view (PPV) event titled Fully Loaded. The WWF had planned to hold a fourth Fully Loaded in 2001, but in May that year, the promotion replaced it with Invasion, held as part of the ongoing Invasion storyline between the WWF and The Alliance, the latter consisting of former World Championship Wrestling (WCW) and Extreme Championship Wrestling (ECW) talent. The event took place on July 22, 2001, at the Gund Arena in Cleveland, Ohio.

=== Storylines ===
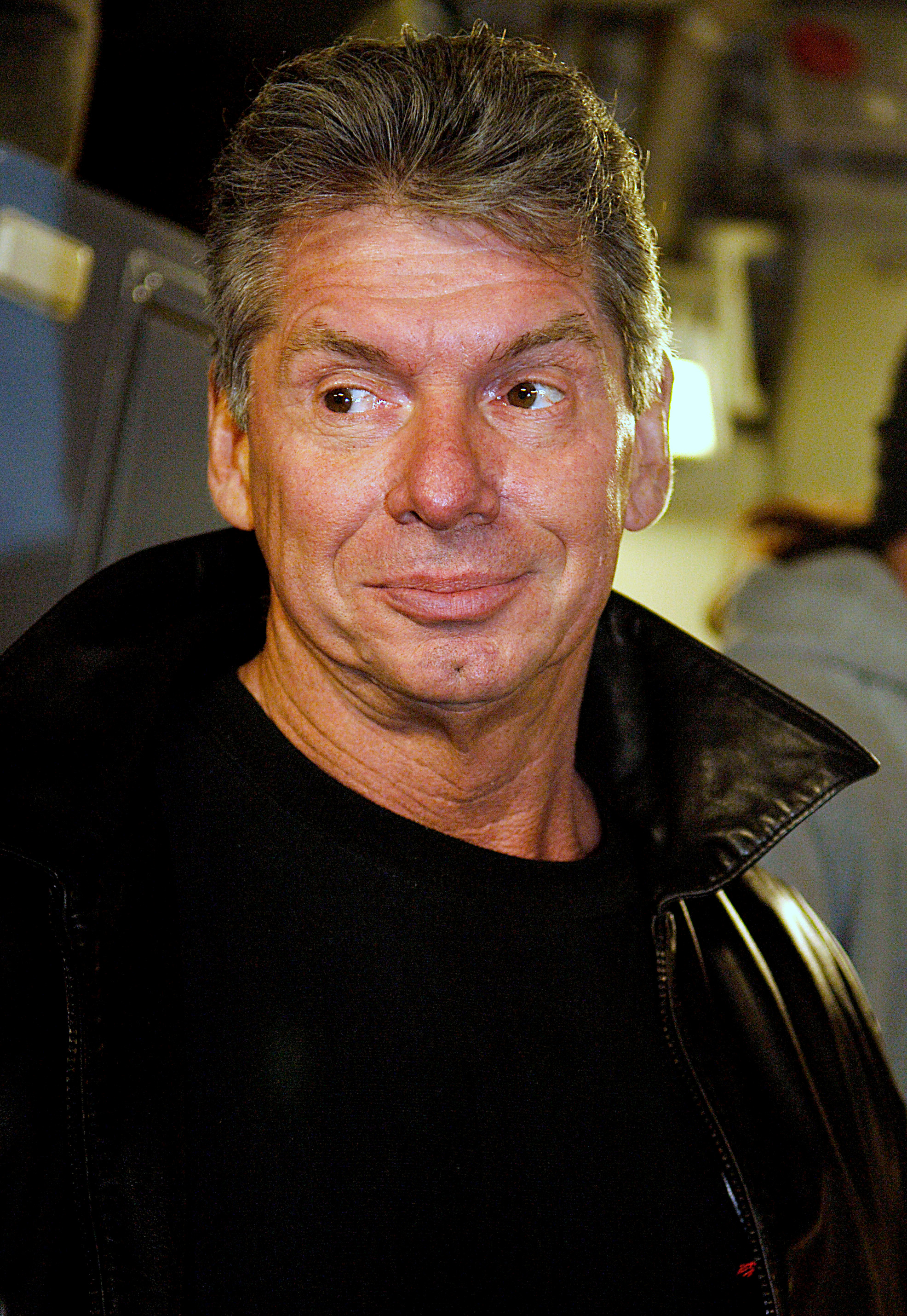
Vince McMahon, the owner of the World Wrestling Federation

On March 23, 2001, the WWF bought out its long-time rival, WCW. The last episode of WCW Monday Nitro aired on March 26, dubbed the "Night of Champions". Nitro started with WWF Owner Vince McMahon announcing a via simulcast with Raw Is War later that night to address the future of WCW, during which it was revealed that Shane McMahon had bought WCW. At WrestleMania X-Seven on April 1, Shane defeated Vince in a Street Fight with some of the WCW talent in attendance, sitting in the upper-level seats at the Reliant Astrodome. During May and June, WCW wrestlers interfered in matches on WWF programming. At the 2001 King of the Ring, Booker T interfered during a Triple Threat match for the WWF Championship, and tossed "Stone Cold" Steve Austin through the announcers table, nearly costing him the title.

The following night on Raw Is War, Shane declared his intention to invade the WWF, and the Invasion storyline started with Booker T performing a scissors kick to Vince. On the June 28 episode of SmackDown!, it was decided that Fully Loaded was to be changed to Invasion, and would feature matches between WWF and WCW wrestlers. The ultimate goal, reportedly, was for WCW to "take over" one of the WWF's two primary programs, either Raw Is War or SmackDown!, and rebrand it as its own separate entity. To test the waters for this, the final twenty minutes of the July 2 episode of Raw Is War was given over to WCW, which brought in its own commentators (Scott Hudson and Arn Anderson), ring announcer (Stacy Keibler), referee (Nick Patrick), ring apron, and Chyron graphics, to present a match between Booker T and Buff Bagwell for Booker T's WCW Championship (which he had won on the final episode of Nitro). This continued on SmackDown!, where Gregory Helms lost the WCW Cruiserweight Championship against Billy Kidman, and Booker T defended the WCW Championship against Diamond Dallas Page. The Booker T/Bagwell title match, however, was very poorly received both by television viewers, and the live crowd in the arena; sports journalist Michael Landsberg reported that many have called the bout "the worst match ever". The two other WCW matches also received a negative fan reaction. The decision was thus made to make WCW a heel group that was out to destroy the WWF. On the July 9 episode of Raw Is War, when then-face WCW owner Shane was scheduled to face Page in a street fight, the two instead attacked The Undertaker, turning Shane heel (Page had already debuted in WWF as a heel, as part of a stalker angle with Undertaker and his wife). Later that night, Chris Jericho, and Kane (from the WWF) fought Lance Storm, and Mike Awesome (from WCW) in a tag team match. It ended in a no contest when ECW Alumni from both the WWF and WCW, along with the debuting Rob Van Dam, and Tommy Dreamer, made their way to the ring. As it looked as though they were going after Storm and Awesome, they instead attacked Jericho and Kane. This led to Raw color-commentator Paul Heyman leaving the announcer's booth, and declared that ECW had joined the invasion, and stated that the invasion had been taken to the extreme, leading to some WWF and WCW wrestlers (including Raven, Lance Storm, Rhyno, The Dudley Boyz, and Tazz) defecting to ECW. Shane appeared to co-operate with Vince against ECW, but later that night, it was revealed that WCW and ECW had merged, and that Stephanie McMahon-Helmsley (who was last seen on the May 21 episode of Raw Is War) now owned ECW.

Earlier in the year, Austin had a change in character, becoming more emotional, and friendly with Vince. On the July 12 episode of SmackDown!, Vince said he needed the "old" Austin, an anti-hero tough character, to lead the WWF at Invasion. After Vince pleaded with him, Austin shook his head and left. During the July 16 episode of Raw is War, Austin was shown drinking in a bar. Later that night, a fight started between many WWF, WCW, and ECW wrestlers. As WWF seemed to be disadvantaged, Austin arrived, and returned to his old character, fighting off the WCW and ECW wrestlers. The WWF wrestlers (Austin, Kurt Angle, Chris Jericho, Kane, and The Undertaker) then cleared out the ring and were left standing tall. On the July 19 episode of SmackDown!, Heyman said that he wanted to bring back wrestling and destroy sports entertainment by giving the WWF its last rites with The Alliance members, "In nomine Patris et Filii et Spiritus Sancti, Amen!", while proclaiming "Death to sports entertainment! Death to the WWF!".

== Event ==
Other on-screen personnel
Role:	Name:
English Commentator	Jim Ross
English Commentator	Michael Cole
Spanish commentator	Carlos Cabrera
Spanish commentator	Hugo Savinovich
Referee	Mike Chioda
Referee	Jack Doan
Referee	Jim Korderas
Referee	Theodore Long
Referee	Mick Foley (Referee's and Tag Team Bra and Panties matches)
Referee	Chad Patton
Referee	Charles Robinson
Referee	Tim White
Ring announcer	Howard Finkel

=== Sunday Night Heat ===
Before the event officially began, Chavo Guerrero (WCW) defeated Scotty 2 Hotty (WWF) in a match taped for Sunday Night Heat.

=== Preliminary matches ===
The first match of the event was between the team of Lance Storm, and Mike Awesome (ECW), and Edge and Christian (WWF). The match went back-and-forth; until Awesome attempted a cheap shot at Edge from the apron. Edge avoided it, performed a dropkick, and sent Storm on top of him with a back body drop. Christian then leaped off Edge over the top rope onto Storm, and Awesome. As Christian was on the top turnbuckle, Awesome tripped Christian and attacked his back outside. Back in the ring, Storm and Awesome dominated Christian after Storm threw Christian's gut into the ringpost. Christian fought back with a crossbody, but Awesome tagged in, and performed a flapjack spinebuster. Storm and Awesome dominated Christian until Christian performed a back body drop to Awesome from the top rope. Edge and Storm tagged in, and Edge performed an Edge-O-Matic to Storm. Storm performed a jawbreaker, and attempted a double belly-to-back suplex with Awesome. Edge landed on his feet, and Christian performed a flying clothesline to both Storm and Awesome. Edge performed a spear to Awesome. Storm attempted a superkick to Christian, but Edge shoved Christian and took the kick himself. As Awesome held Edge in a crucifix, Christian performed a spear to Awesome. Edge landed on top of Awesome and pinned him for the victory.

The second match was between WCW Senior Referee Nick Patrick and WWF Senior Referee Earl Hebner with Mick Foley as the special guest referee. Other WCW and WWF referees accompanied them to the ring. The match started with Hebner delivering kicks in the corner, followed by punches, and knee drops to the midsection, but Patrick pulled Hebner outside. Back in the ring, Patrick stomped Hebner, but Hebner fought back with punches, and mounted punches. Patrick fought back by performing a low blow, and sent Hebner outside with a baseball slide. WCW referees stomped Hebner until Foley stopped them, and ejected them from ringside. Back in the ring, Patrick complained to Foley, allowing Hebner to perform a flying shoulder block, and pin Patrick for the victory. After the match, Patrick argued with Foley. Foley punched him and applied the mandible claw.

The third match was between the APA (Faarooq and Bradshaw) (WWF), and Sean O'Haire and Chuck Palumbo (WCW). The teams were the tag team champions of their promotions. The match began with the APA performing a double spinebuster to Palumbo. Bradshaw had the advantage over Palumbo, then O'Haire. After Faarooq tagged in, O'Haire countered a belly-to-back suplex attempt and performed a knee lift. Palumbo tagged in, and Faarooq performed a flying shoulder block. Bradshaw then tagged in and performed a fallaway slam to Palumbo. O'Haire then kicked Bradshaw in the head and performed a Widow Maker. Palumbo tagged in, and Bradshaw fought back with a DDT. After Faarooq tagged in, O'Haire pulled him out of the ring and sent him into the ring steps. They dominated Faarooq until Faarooq fought back with a spinebuster. Bradshaw and Palumbo tagged in, and Bradshaw performed a big boot, and a powerslam. As Bradshaw attempted a fallaway slam, O'Haire performed a superkick and dropped Bradshaw onto the top turnbuckle. After Faarooq sent O'Haire outside, Palumbo performed a superkick to Faarooq, and Bradshaw pinned Palumbo after performing a Clothesline from Hell.

The fourth match was between the WWF Light Heavyweight Champion X-Pac and the WCW Cruiserweight Champion Billy Kidman. The match started back and forth until Kidman performed a hurricanrana, and an enzuigiri. X-Pac fought back after sending Kidman over the top rope, and performed a springboard reverse crossbody to the outside. Back in the ring, X-Pac applied the sleeper hold. Kidman escaped and applied the sleeper hold, but X-Pac countered with a belly-to-back suplex. X-Pac went to the top rope and performed a somersault legdrop, but Kidman avoided it. Kidman performed a B.K. Bomb, and mounted punches, which X-Pac countered with a powerbomb. X-Pac attempted another powerbomb, but Kidman reversed it into a sitout facebuster. X-Pac then countered an aerial attack with an X-Factor. As he attempted a Bronco buster, Kidman lifted his leg, performing a low blow. Kidman then pinned X-Pac after a shooting star press.

The fifth match was between Raven (ECW) and WWF commissioner William Regal (WWF). Regal gained the early advantage following a double underhook suplex, and a catapult, sending Raven outside. Back in the ring, Raven tossed Regal over the top rope and performed a baseball slide, and a Russian legsweep into the security wall. Back in the ring, Raven performed a diving punch to Regal's forehead. Regal countered another attempt and performed a knee lift. Raven fought back with a corner clothesline, and a running bulldog. Regal fought back, countering a Raven Effect DDT into a Northern Lights suplex. After both collided, Raven rolled out of the ring, as Tazz came down. As the referee checked on Raven, Tazz performed a T-Bone suplex to Regal. Tazz left, and Raven pinned Regal after performing a Raven Effect DDT.

The sixth match was between The Big Show, Billy Gunn and Albert (WWF), and Chris Kanyon, Shawn Stasiak and Hugh Morrus (WCW). Before the match began, the WWF wrestlers gorilla pressed the WCW wrestlers. The match started with Kanyon attacking Gunn in the corner. Gunn performed an electric chair drop, but Stasiak hit a cheap shot, and Kanyon performed a Russian legsweep followed by a forward Russian legsweep. Stasiak tagged in, and Gunn performed a neckbreaker slam. After Albert tagged in, Kanyon and Morrus entered the ring, but Gunn and The Big Show threw them out. Albert performed a bicycle kick, and a Baldo Bomb to Stasiak. Morrus and Kanyon attacked Albert, and Morrus performed a DDT. Morrus tagged in, and Albert performed a powerslam before tagging in Gunn. Gunn performed a Fameasser to Morrus, and attempted the One and Only. Stasiak attacked him from behind, performing an inverted DDT, and Morrus pinned him for the victory. After the match, The Big Show performed chokeslams to Morrus and Stasiak, and an Alley Oop to Kanyon.

The seventh match was between Tazz (ECW) and Tajiri (WWF). The match started with Tajiri performing a spinning heel kick, and a standing moonsault. Tazz fought back with a head and arm suplex. Tajiri then escaped a suplex attempt and performed kicks and punches. Tazz fought back with a clothesline. After Tazz applied a cross armbar, and performed a flapjack spinebuster, Tajiri fought back with a handspring back elbow. Tazz then pulled Tajiri off the apron and sent him into the ring steps. Back in the ring, Tajiri applied the Tarantula, and dropkicked Tazz, who was kneeling. Tazz then blocked a kick and performed a capture suplex. He then shoved the referee out of the way, allowing Tajiri to spit green mist into Tazz's face, and pin him after a Buzzsaw Kick.

The eighth match was between Rob Van Dam (ECW) and Jeff Hardy (WWF) for the WWF Hardcore Championship. Before the match began, Van Dam attacked Matt Hardy from behind with a steel chair. The match started back and forth with a quick pace. Hardy gained the advantage after a dropkick to the back. After Hardy missed a crossbody, Van Dam performed a standing moonsault, a lifting double underhook facebuster, and a rolling thunder. Van Dam then climbed the turnbuckles, but Hardy shoved him outside. Outside, Hardy walked through the barricade, but Van Dam sent him into the crowd. After a moonsault from the barricade, Hardy was placed over the barricade, and Van Dam performed a spinning heel kick off the apron. Hardy fought back with a sunset flip powerbomb from the apron, took out a ladder, and climbed it. However, Van Dam tipped the ladder, causing Hardy to fall. Van Dam attempted to use a chair, but Hardy used the ladder. After Hardy hit Van Dam with the chair, Van Dam came back with a Van Daminator, sending Hardy off the stage. Back in the ring, Van Dam performed a Chair Surf and attempted a split-legged moonsault, but Hardy blocked it with his knees. Hardy followed with a DDT, a German suplex, and a sitout jawbreaker. Later on, Van Dam avoided a Swanton Bomb. Van Dam placed the Hardcore Championship belt on Hardy, and performed a Five Star Frog Splash onto the title. Van Dam then pinned Hardy to win the Hardcore Championship.

The ninth match was a Bra and Panties match between Torrie Wilson and Stacy Keibler (WCW), and Trish Stratus and Lita (WWF) with Mick Foley as the special guest referee. The match started with Lita and Stratus taking down Keibler and Wilson. Wilson dropkicked Stratus's back and kicked her in the corner. Stratus fought back with a clothesline and attempted to remove Wilson's shirt after a suplex. Keibler stopped her, and they attempted to double team, but Stratus performed a double clothesline. Lita tagged in, knocked Wilson off the apron, and removed Keibler's shirt after pulling her in. Keibler went outside the ring, and Lita chased after her. This allowed Wilson to stomp on Lita, and Keibler removed her shirt. Lita fought back with a snapmare, and attempted a diving crossbody. Wilson and Stratus tagged in and performed a clothesline. Wilson fought back and pulled Stratus up while stepping on her hair. She pulled down her top, but Stratus performed a roll-up and removed Wilson's pants. Lita and Stratus then performed a Poetry in Motion, with Lita performing an aided clothesline to Wilson, before removing Wilson's shirt. Stratus then performed a bulldog to Keibler, and Lita performed a Litasault. They then removed Keibler's pants to win the match.

=== Main event ===
The main event was the "Inaugural Brawl", a no disqualification ten-man tag team match between Team WCW/ECW (Booker T, Diamond Dallas Page, The Dudley Boyz (Bubba Ray Dudley and D-Von Dudley) and Rhyno), and Team WWF ("Stone Cold" Steve Austin, Kurt Angle, The Undertaker, Kane and Chris Jericho). WCW owner Shane McMahon, ECW owner Stephanie McMahon-Helmsley, Paul Heyman, and WWF owner Vince McMahon were at ringside. The Undertaker attacked Page during his entrance, and all wrestlers fought at ringside. The match began with Team WWF having the advantage as Austin dominated Rhyno. Team WCW/ECW gained the advantage after Page performed a hangman to The Undertaker. Team WCW/ECW dominated The Undertaker until he performed a DDT. Team WWF kept the advantage until Booker T performed a flapjack to Jericho with help from D-Von. Jericho fought back, knocking down the Dudley Boyz, and tagged in Angle. Angle fought the Dudley Boyz until Bubba Ray performed a Bubba Bomb. Angle was dominated by Team WCW/ECW until The Undertaker came in illegally, and attacked Page. All wrestlers entered the ring, and fought. The Undertaker fought with Page, and, after performing a chokeslam, they fought into the crowd. Austin was down holding his knee as Booker T and Angle were lying in the ring. On the outside, Kane was double-teamed by the Dudley Boyz. Kane eventually fought back, performing a chokeslam to D-Von through the announce table. Bubba Ray and Rhyno then sent Kane through the other announce table with a double suplex. Jericho then sent Rhyno through a table with a shoulder block from the apron. In the ring, Bubba Ray and Booker T double-teamed Angle until Angle fought back, performing a German suplex to Booker T, and an Angle Slam to Bubba Ray. Angle attempted to apply the ankle lock on Booker T, but Booker T kicked him into the referee. Booker T then performed a flapjack, and all three were down. Vince got the WWF Championship belt and attempted to throw it to Angle. Shane took it and hit Vince with it. Shane failed to hit Angle, and Angle threw both Shane and Bubba Ray out of the ring. Angle performed an Angle Slam on Booker T, and applied the ankle lock. After sending the referee back in the ring, Austin turned on Team WWF by performing a Stone Cold Stunner to Angle. Booker T then pinned Angle to win the match for Team WCW/ECW. After the match, Austin celebrated with Shane, Stephanie, and Heyman.

== Aftermath ==
After this pay-per-view, the Invasion storyline continued. The following night on Raw is War, Steve Austin explained his defection was because he felt unappreciated. WCW/ECW, now referred to as The Alliance, had the momentum, holding the WWF Championship, the WWF Intercontinental Championship, and the WWF Hardcore Championship, in addition to all of WCW's titles. The feud soon centered around the return of The Rock, and which team he would join, as both Vince, and Shane attempted to persuade The Rock to join their team. The Rock remained with the WWF, and engaged in a feud with Booker T over the WCW Championship. Austin would begin a feud with Kurt Angle over the WWF Championship after the events at Invasion.

As the Invasion storyline concluded at Survivor Series in November, this was the only Invasion PPV held, and instead of reinstating Fully Loaded in July 2002, the WWF, which was renamed to World Wrestling Entertainment (WWE) in May 2002, moved Vengeance to the July slot; Vengeance had temporarily replaced Armageddon in December 2001 due to the September 11 attacks.

=== Planned revival ===
On the September 23, 2025, episode of NXT, the weekly show focused on WWE's developmental brand, wrestlers from the promotion Total Nonstop Action Wrestling (TNA), which had been in a partnership with WWE since January, interrupted a Winner Takes All match between Oba Femi and Trick Williams for the NXT Championship and TNA World Championship, beginning with TNA's Mike Santana, who was slated to face Williams for the TNA World Championship at Bound for Glory. On September 27 at NXT No Mercy, NXT General Manager Ava announced a special episode of NXT for October 7 called Invasion, reviving the Invasion name after more than 24 years. However, just a couple days later, the episode's name was changed to Showdown after backlash in Israel and among the Jewish diaspora because the date fell on the second anniversary of the October 7 attacks, which led to the start of the Gaza war.

== Results ==
No.	Results	Stipulations	Times
1^{H}	Chavo Guerrero (WCW) defeated Scotty 2 Hotty (WWF)	Singles match	6:43
2	Edge and Christian (WWF) defeated Lance Storm and Mike Awesome (ECW)	Tag team match	10:10
3	Earl Hebner (WWF) defeated Nick Patrick (WCW)	Singles match with Mick Foley as special guest referee	2:50
4	The APA (Bradshaw and Faarooq) (WWF) defeated Chuck Palumbo and Sean O'Haire (WCW)	Tag team match	6:48
5	Billy Kidman (WCW) defeated X-Pac (WWF)	Singles match	7:07
6	Raven (ECW) defeated William Regal (WWF)	Singles match	6:35
7	Chris Kanyon, Hugh Morrus and Shawn Stasiak (WCW) defeated Albert, Big Show and Billy Gunn (WWF)	Six-man tag team match	4:20
8	Tajiri (WWF) defeated Tazz (ECW)	Singles match	5:30
9	Rob Van Dam (ECW) defeated Jeff Hardy (c) (WWF)	Hardcore match for the WWF Hardcore Championship	12:40
10	Trish Stratus and Lita (WWF) defeated Torrie Wilson and Stacy Keibler (WCW)	Bra and Panties match with Mick Foley as special guest referee	5:03
11	Team WCW/ECW (Booker T, The Dudley Boyz, Diamond Dallas Page, and Rhyno) (with Shane McMahon, Stephanie McMahon-Helmsley, and Paul Heyman) (WCW/ECW) defeated Team WWF (Chris Jericho, Kane, Kurt Angle, "Stone Cold" Steve Austin and The Undertaker) (with Vince McMahon) (WWF)	10-man Tag Team match	29:05
(c) / – the champion(s) heading into the match; H / – the match was broadcast prior to the pay-per-view on Sunday Night Heat
