= WWE European Championship =

American professional wrestling promotion

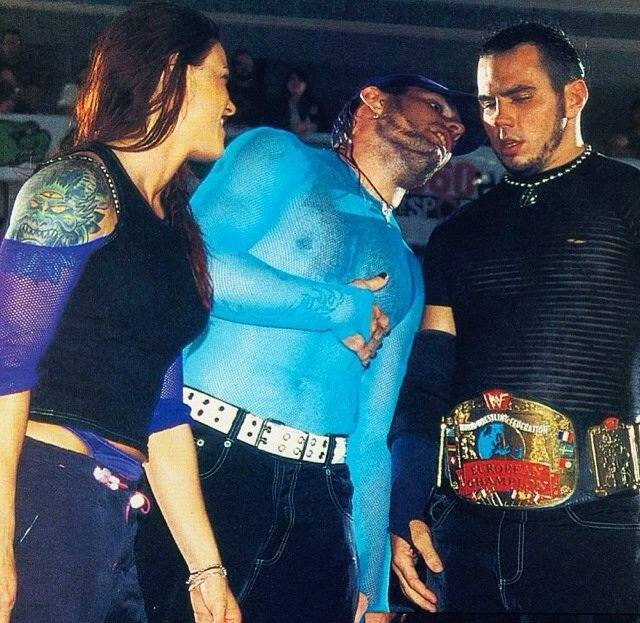
- Matt Hardy as European Champion alongside his brother Jeff, who also held the title

Details
- Promotion: WWF/WWE
- Date established: February 26, 1997
- Date retired: July 22, 2002 (unified with the WWE Intercontinental Championship)

Other names
- WWF European Championship (1997–2002); WWE European Championship (2002)
Statistics
- First champion: The British Bulldog
- Final champion: Rob Van Dam
- Most reigns: 4 reigns: William Regal; D'Lo Brown
- Longest reign: The British Bulldog (1st reign, 206 days) (Note: 205 days as recognized by WWE.)
- Shortest reign: 1 day: (Note: Both of their respective reigns are recognized as lasting less than one day by WWE.): Chris Jericho; Jeff Jarrett
- Oldest champion: Diamond Dallas Page (46 years, 302 days)
- Youngest champion: Jeff Hardy (24 years, 311 days)
- Heaviest champion: Mark Henry (392 lb (178 kg))
- Lightest champion: Spike Dudley (150 lb (68 kg))

The WWE European Championship was a professional wrestling championship competed for in World Wrestling Entertainment (WWE). During its history it generally served as a secondary title along with the WWE Intercontinental Championship at the time and was generally held by midcarders during its existence in the late 1990s and early 2000s. The title was generally considered more prestigious than the WWE Hardcore Championship after it was introduced in 1999 but was also considered less prestigious than the Intercontinental Championship. Multiple wrestlers also held the European and WWE Intercontinental Championships within short spans of each other, and three held both simultaneously, becoming "Eurocontinental champions".

Established in February 1997 as the "WWF European Championship", the title incurred a brief hiatus in April 1999 due to then-champion Shane McMahon's desire to retire as an "undefeated champion". The title returned in June 1999. It was renamed in May 2002 when the WWF became the WWE before finally being unified with the WWE Intercontinental Championship in July that year. Despite its name, only two holders were actually from Europe: the British Bulldog, who was the inaugural and longest-reigning champion, and William Regal. It became a prominent singles title of the Attitude Era, held by then-former world champion Shawn Michaels along with Triple H, Kurt Angle, Chris Jericho, and Eddie Guerrero, among others.

== History ==
In 1997, the British Bulldog was crowned the first WWF European Champion by winning a tournament that was held over several shows in Germany, culminating in a finals victory over Owen Hart. Upon winning the title, Shawn Michaels became the first Grand Slam Champion in WWE. Michaels is the only wrestler to have held both the WWF Championship and the European title at the same time.

After winning the European title, both D'Lo Brown and Al Snow were billed from different parts of Europe each week while champion. During Snow's reign, he and "Head" dressed up as various ethnic stereotypes corresponding to the European location they were billed from, though not always in a politically or geographically correct manner. The title was retired briefly in April 1999 by then-champion Shane McMahon, who wanted to retire as an "undefeated champion". McMahon reintroduced the championship two months later and gave it to Mideon, who saw the title belt in Shane's travel bag and asked if he could have it.

=== Inaugural tournament ===
Quarterfinals; Xpress Tour; February 20–23, 1997
The British Bulldog	Pinfall
Mankind	—
Vader	Pinfall
Rocky Maivia	—
Owen Hart	Pinfall
Flash Funk	—
Bret Hart	Submission
Hunter Hearst Helmsley	9:00

Semifinals; Xpress Tour; February 24–25, 1997
The British Bulldog	Pinfall
Vader	—
Owen Hart	Countout
Bret Hart	18:00

Final; Monday Night Raw; February 26, 1997 (Aired: March 3)
The British Bulldog	Pinfall
Owen Hart	16:58

=== Eurocontinental Champions and unification ===
The term "Eurocontinental Champion" is a portmanteau of European and Intercontinental, used to describe wrestlers who held both titles simultaneously. Three wrestlers accomplished this feat. The first was D'Lo Brown, who defeated Mideon for the European title at Fully Loaded in 1999 and two nights later at a Monday Night Raw taping, defeated Jeff Jarrett to win the Intercontinental Championship. A month later, at SummerSlam, Jarrett defeated Brown to win both titles but awarded the European Championship to Mark Henry the following day.

On the February 10, 2000 edition of SmackDown!, Kurt Angle defeated Val Venis for the European Championship. Seventeen days later, at No Way Out, Angle defeated Chris Jericho for the Intercontinental Championship and became the third Eurocontinental Champion. Angle held the titles until WrestleMania 2000, when he faced Jericho and Chris Benoit in a two-fall triple threat match for both titles. In a rarity, Angle lost both of his championships without being pinned or forced to submit; Benoit defeated Jericho in the first fall for the Intercontinental Championship and Jericho defeated Benoit in the second fall to take the European Championship.

In May 2002, the WWF was renamed to WWE and the title was renamed accordingly, though the physical belt was not updated to reflect the name change. The title was then unified with the WWE Intercontinental Championship in a ladder match on the July 22, 2002 episode of Raw, when Intercontinental Champion Rob Van Dam defeated European Champion Jeff Hardy.

== Reigns ==
The British Bulldog was the inaugural champion, and had the longest title reign at 206 days. William Regal and D'Lo Brown both had the most title reigns, each holding it four times. Final champion Jeff Hardy was the youngest to win it, doing so at the age of 24, while Diamond Dallas Page was the oldest champion, winning the title at 45 years old. The title was retired on the July 22, 2002 episode of Monday Night Raw when Rob Van Dam defeated Hardy in a ladder match to unify the European Championship into the Intercontinental Championship.

== Other media ==
The title appears in the video games WWF Attitude, WWF WrestleMania 2000, WWF No Mercy, WWF SmackDown!, WWF SmackDown! 2: Know Your Role, WWF SmackDown! Just Bring It, WWE WrestleMania X8, WWE SmackDown! Shut Your Mouth, WWE '12, WWE '13, WWE 2K14, WWE 2K15, WWE 2K16, WWE 2K17, WWE 2K18, WWE 2K19, WWE 2K20, WWE 2K22, WWE 2K23, WWE 2K24, WWE 2K25 and WWE 2K26.

== See also ==
- wXw European Championship
- TNA International Championship
