= WWF Fully Loaded =

World Wrestling Federation pay-per-view event series

- WWF Fully Loaded logo
- Promotion: World Wrestling Federation
- Other names: Fully Loaded: In Your House (1998)
- First event: 1998
- Last event: 2000

WWF Fully Loaded was an annual July pay-per-view (PPV) event produced by the World Wrestling Federation (WWF, now WWE), a Connecticut-based professional wrestling promotion. First held in 1998, the first edition of Fully Loaded was an In Your House pay-per-view. The 1999 edition was simply named Fully Loaded as WWF dropped the In Your House branding after February 1999. Fully Loaded was held for one more year in 2000, as in 2001, the event was replaced by Invasion, which was then replaced by Vengeance in 2002.

== History ==
Fully Loaded was first held as an In Your House pay-per-view (PPV) event. In Your House was a series of monthly PPVs first produced by the World Wrestling Federation (WWF, now WWE) in May 1995. They aired when the promotion was not holding one of its major PPVs and were sold at a lower cost. Fully Loaded: In Your House was the 23rd In Your House event and took place on July 26, 1998, at the Selland Arena in Fresno, California.

After the In Your House branding was retired following February 1999's St. Valentine's Day Massacre: In Your House, Fully Loaded branched off as its own PPV that July. A third event was held in July 2000 which was the final event using the Fully Loaded name. In 2001, the event was replaced by InVasion, which was held as part of The Invasion storyline between the WWF and The Alliance (consisting of former World Championship Wrestling and Extreme Championship Wrestling talent). After the Invasion storyline ended, instead of bringing back Fully Loaded in 2002, the July slot was instead given to Vengeance, thus definitively discontinuing Fully Loaded.

== Events ==
#	Event	Date	City	Venue	Main event	Ref.
1	Fully Loaded: In Your House	July 26, 1998	Fresno, California	Selland Arena	Kane and Mankind (c) vs. Stone Cold Steve Austin and The Undertaker for the WWF Tag Team Championship	
2	Fully Loaded (1999)	July 25, 1999	Buffalo, New York	Marine Midland Arena	Stone Cold Steve Austin (c) vs. The Undertaker in a First Blood match for the WWF Championship	
3	Fully Loaded (2000)	July 23, 2000	Dallas, Texas	Reunion Arena	The Rock (c) vs. Chris Benoit for the WWF Championship	
(c) – refers to the champion(s) heading into the match
