= Low Blow =

Low blow may refer to:

- Low blow (combat sports), a groin attack
- Professional wrestling attacks § Low blow
- Below the belt attack
- An unfair personal attack

Low Blow may refer to:

- Low Blow (album), 1999 release by jazz musician Victor Bailey
- NATO reporting name of the SA-3, fire control radar
- Low Blows (podcast), a podcast centred around professional wrestling critique
- Low Blows (album), a 2017 album by Meg Mac
  - "Low Blows" (song), a 2017 sing by Meg Mac
- "Low Blow", song by Kylie Minogue from Golden
- Low Blow (film), a 1986 film
