= The Invasion (professional wrestling) =

Professional wrestling storyline

Poster for the eponymous WWF Invasion pay-per-view, which features the faces of Shane and Vince McMahon morphing together.

The Invasion was a professional wrestling storyline in the World Wrestling Federation (WWF, now known as WWE) during the Attitude Era that ran from March to November 2001 and involved stables of wrestlers purporting to represent World Championship Wrestling (WCW) and Extreme Championship Wrestling (ECW)—which merged to form The Alliance—placed against a stable of wrestlers purporting to represent the WWF. The storyline began shortly after the WWF's acquisition of WCW in March 2001, and concluded with a "winner takes all" match between The Alliance and the WWF at Survivor Series.

The idea of a supercard featuring the two top promotions of the Monday Night War was considered to be a dream match scenario in the eyes of many wrestling fans, as it would allow the fans to see which promotion would be superior in kayfabe. The angle began when Mr. McMahon's son, Shane McMahon, announced as part of the storyline on WWF's Raw Is War and the final episode of WCW's Nitro (which merged into a simulcast) that he had bought WCW from under his father's nose. This led to several run-in appearances of WCW wrestlers during Raw Is War and SmackDown! over the months following WrestleMania X-Seven.

In June 2001, the angle grew in intensity as other WWF storylines somewhat abated to make room for the central Invasion storyline. WCW and ECW merged to form The Alliance and challenged the WWF's control over the wrestling industry. An "Inaugural Brawl" took place at the Invasion pay-per-view, where WWF's top star Stone Cold Steve Austin defected and joined The Alliance. Many inter-promotional matches occurred during the Invasion between The Alliance and the WWF, leading up to the climax of the angle at Survivor Series, when Team WWF (The Rock, Chris Jericho, Big Show, The Undertaker and Kane) defeated Team Alliance (Stone Cold Steve Austin, Kurt Angle, Rob Van Dam, Booker T and Shane McMahon) in a "winner take all" elimination tag team match. Immediately after the match, The Alliance disbanded.

The angle saw financial success for the WWF, with the Invasion pay-per-view garnering a buyrate of 775,000, one of the largest non-WrestleMania buyrates in company history. Despite its commercial success, the angle received mixed reviews following its conclusion, and is generally historically considered a major disappointment by fans and critics.

== History ==
=== End of the Monday Night War ===
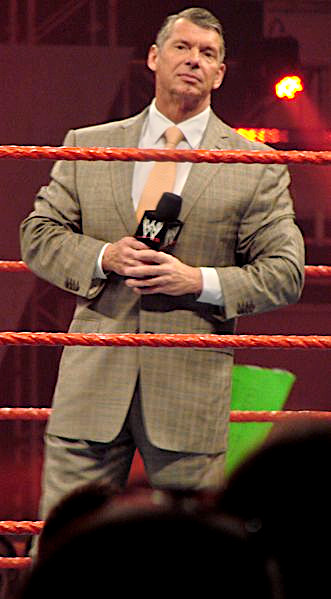
Vince McMahon and the WWF legitimately acquired the rights to WCW in March 2001.

During the Monday Night War, the World Wrestling Federation (WWF) and World Championship Wrestling (WCW), the two largest North American wrestling promotions, competed for television ratings. Due to similar developments such as the creations of the New World Order (nWo) and D-Generation X (DX), fans continually compared the two promotions.

Among other factors, mismanagement within WCW eventually led the company to a decrease in popularity, from which it never recovered. The Monday Night War came to an end on March 23, 2001, when the WWF bought the rights to WCW's video library, trademarks, contracts for selected wrestlers, championship belts, and other select properties for what was considered by CNN Money to be a "low bargain price".

The final night of the televised Monday Night War occurred on March 26: Raw Is War primarily focused on the major storylines heading into WWF's WrestleMania X-Seven event, while WCW's Nitro held their final episode with a "Night of Champions" special. Mr. McMahon, the storyline and real-life owner of the WWF, opened up Nitro and announced a simulcast later that night to address the future of WCW. Throughout Raw Is War, McMahon publicly named several WCW wrestlers who would not be retained. Though this was for storyline purposes and most would wrestle for WWF/WWE in the ensuing years, he did legitimately fire Jeff Jarrett on television due to animosity between the two dating back to 1999, when Jarrett blackmailed McMahon for payment after he was booked for a match at No Mercy following his contract expiry the day before. After Sting defeated Ric Flair in WCW's final match, the simulcast began. McMahon talked about the buyout of WCW and toyed with the idea of making WCW into a huge media conglomerate, much like the WWF. He asked the crowd who he should keep under his belt by mentioning names of WCW wrestlers and asking for a reaction. Lex Luger and Hulk Hogan received a negative reaction from fans, and Buff Bagwell, Booker T, Scott Steiner, Sting, and Goldberg received positive reactions. McMahon then proceeded to fire them all, however, to the cheers of the Raw Is War crowd and the jeers of the Nitro crowd. McMahon then announced that he would sign the contract and make the purchase official at WrestleMania, on the condition that Ted Turner would bring the contract for McMahon to sign personally. Shane McMahon, however, appeared on Nitro and announced in kayfabe that he had signed the contract and purchased WCW out from under his father's nose, planting the seed for what was considered a lucrative future storyline opportunity. The Invasion did not begin immediately afterwards, as the WWF was preparing for WrestleMania, the year's largest show, occurring only days after the final night of the Monday Night War.

=== WCW's first strike; Start of The Invasion ===
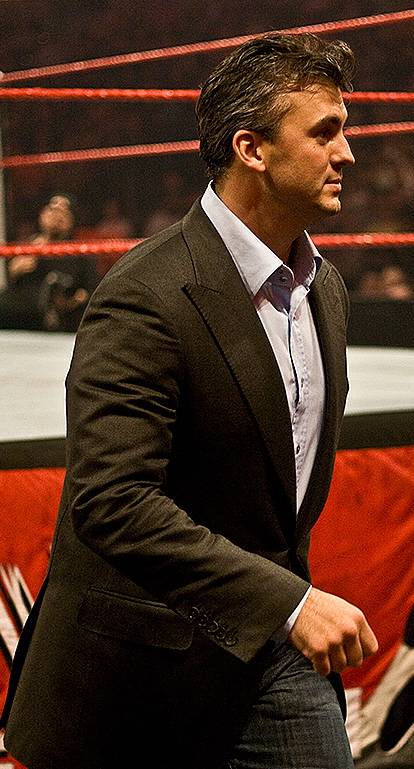
Shane McMahon owned WCW throughout the Invasion storyline.

The WWF had effectively doubled the size of its roster through its acquisition of WCW, and as a result, the company believed that there was not enough screen time for many of the new roster members. To alleviate these concerns, the original plan was to find a time slot on TNN (later renamed to Spike TV, now known as Paramount Network) to continue running WCW as a separate entity, with WWF controlling SmackDown! on UPN and WCW controlling Raw Is War on TNN. These plans fell through when no television networks would touch WCW because of its reputation for losing money. The WWF scrapped these plans, however they would eventually carry the idea again in the future for what would later become the brand extension, running two separate brands, with both of the WWF's two existing televised shows, SmackDown! and Raw.

On the May 28 episode of Raw Is War, Lance Storm became the first WCW wrestler to appear on WWF programming, by performing a run-in during a match featuring WWF wrestlers. WCW's Hugh Morrus made his WWF debut on the June 4 episode of Raw Is War by attacking Edge. At King of the Ring on June 24, then-WCW Champion Booker T interfered during the triple threat main event match for the WWF Championship and almost cost Stone Cold Steve Austin the title. Additionally, Austin legitimately suffered fractured bones in his hand from the side slam he took from Booker T into an announce table. The next night on Raw Is War, which was held in New York City's Madison Square Garden, widely considered the WWF's home arena, a confrontation occurred between WCW owner Shane McMahon and WWF owner Mr. McMahon. While Mr. McMahon was in the ring, Booker T came from behind to perform his finishing move, a scissor kick, on him. The WWF roster ran to the ring to aid Mr. McMahon, but Booker T and Shane McMahon escaped through the crowd. This incident marked the official start of the Invasion storyline; Raw Is War commentator Jim Ross announced, "The battle lines have been drawn!" WCW Tag Team Champions Chuck Palumbo and Sean O'Haire then made their WWF debuts on June 28, by invading SmackDown! and attacking the Hardy Boyz and Dudley Boyz during a tag team match, before fleeing after WWF wrestlers came after them in the ring. As they were exiting the arena, they were attacked from behind by other WWF wrestlers led by Hardcore Holly and the APA, preventing what happened with the previous WCW wrestlers running to the arena exits undisturbed and rushing them back into the ring, where they were beaten up by WWF wrestlers.

In July, the WWF tested the idea of a brand extension between WWF and WCW by branding the final twenty minutes of the July 2 episode of Raw Is War under the "WCW" name, with Scott Hudson and Arn Anderson as the announcers in place of Jim Ross and Paul Heyman. During a match between Buff Bagwell and Booker T for the WCW Championship, WWF wrestlers Kurt Angle and then WWF Champion Stone Cold Steve Austin interfered in retaliation by beating Booker T up, with Bagwell joining Angle and Austin in attacking Booker T. This match was poorly received by the audience in attendance at the Tacoma Dome in Tacoma, Washington; sports journalist Michael Landsberg reported that many have called the bout "the worst match ever". One source cited that the match should have showcased the best of WCW, but instead featured too many restholds and not enough action. The audience jeered the wrestlers with chants of "This match sucks!" and "Boring!" A WWF source close to Vince McMahon said that he "absolutely hated" the segment. In a podcast interview with Stone Cold Steve Austin in 2015, Bagwell expressed his suspicions of the WWF's true plans for the WCW product, stating his confusion as to why his match with Booker T took place in Tacoma, Washington (very much a pro-WWF area) instead of on the following week's Raw Is War show at the Philips Arena in Atlanta (the former headquarters city of WCW), where the match likely would have received a more positive fan reception.

Up until this point, the WCW contingent were being depicted as malcontent faces rising up against the heel Mr. McMahon, because of McMahon's bluster during the final Nitro broadcast and Shane's usurping of the WCW ownership. Originally, WCW talents were meant to attack strictly heel WWF wrestlers. The strongly negative reaction of the core WWF viewership to the WCW product and talent, however, coupled with the reality that a WCW wrestling program tailored to appeal to WWF fans would not come to fruition, led to the entire WCW contingent being abruptly turned heel. One example was the heel gimmick of WCW wrestler Diamond Dallas Page, whose first WWF appearance was built up over several weeks in a storyline in which he was portrayed as an anonymous stalker sending invasive videotapes to then-babyface, The Undertaker and his wife.

=== Addition of ECW; Formation of The Alliance ===
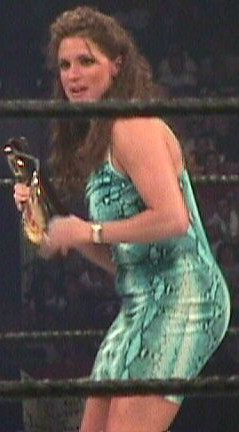
Stephanie McMahon became the storyline owner of ECW and joined with her brother to form The Alliance.

On the July 9 episode of Raw Is War at Philips Arena in Atlanta, Georgia, Kane was scheduled to face WCW's Mike Awesome and Lance Storm in a handicap match. Chris Jericho came out and offered to be Kane's partner, thus turning it into a tag team match. Near the end of the match, Jericho applied the Walls of Jericho on Storm. As the move was being applied, however, Rob Van Dam and Tommy Dreamer ran through the audience and into the ring and started to beat on Kane and Jericho. In response, WWF wrestlers consisting of The Dudley Boyz, Tazz, Justin Credible, Rhyno, and Raven (all former Extreme Championship Wrestling (ECW) wrestlers) ran to the ring. After a brief stand-off, the WWF cavalry turned around and attacked Kane and Jericho. This prompted Paul Heyman to leave the announce table and enter the ring. After high-fiving the wrestlers, he announced that ECW was entering into the Invasion. Heyman talked about how tired he was sitting beside Jim Ross and discussing WCW versus WWF, stating that he felt that everyone had forgotten about ECW and announced, "This Invasion just got taken to the extreme!".

Later during the night, Shane and Mr. McMahon bumped into each other backstage. Shane told his father that ECW needed to be taken care of and pointed out that there were ten ECW wrestlers under Heyman's belt. He suggested that WWF and WCW field five wrestlers each to take out ECW; Mr. McMahon agreed, but he stubbornly insisted that WCW would eventually meet its demise when all was said and done.

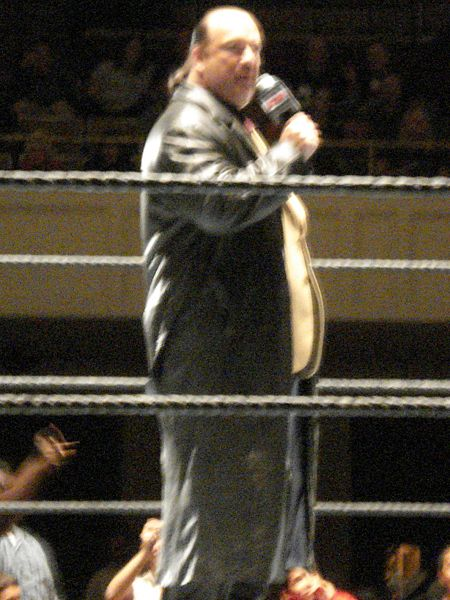
Paul Heyman had been a color commentator for Raw Is War for most of 2001, following the departure of Jerry Lawler. On July 9, Heyman defected from the WWF and became the ECW representative of The Alliance.

At the end of the night, the WCW wrestlers came into the ring, accompanied by Shane McMahon. The WWF wrestlers then came into the ring and, before ECW entered, the WCW and WWF wrestlers started to brawl. The WWF wrestlers cleared the ring, but then were stormed by the ECW wrestlers and taken out. The WCW wrestlers came into the ring, high-fived the ECW men and then dismantled the WWF wrestlers as Paul Heyman and Shane McMahon hugged in triumph. Upon seeing a stunned Mr. McMahon asking what was going on, Shane admitted being responsible for all the events that just transpired and announced that ECW and WCW merged to form The Alliance – with Stephanie McMahon as ECW's new owner.

=== Stone Cold Steve Austin's exile and return ===
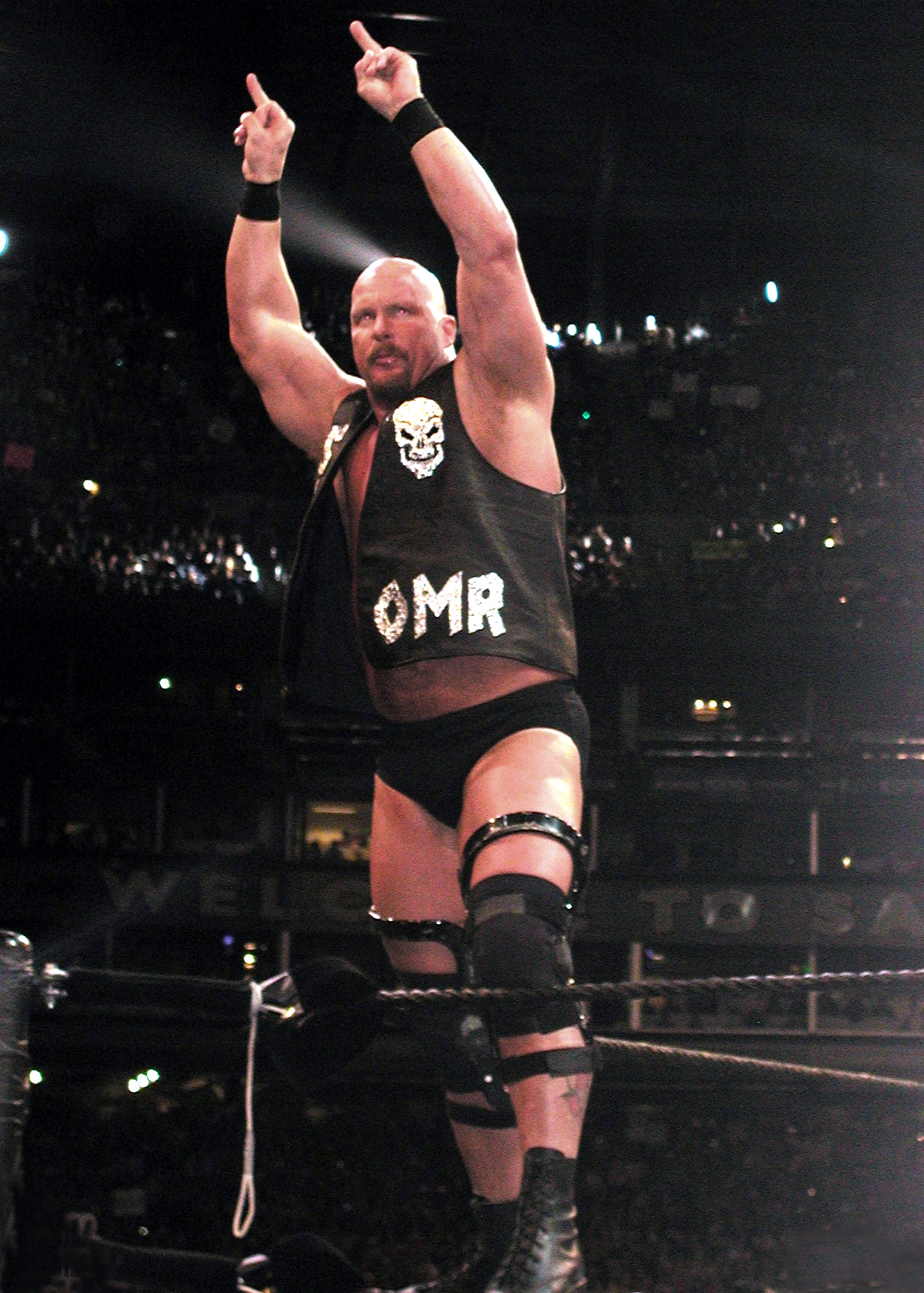
Stone Cold Steve Austin defected from the WWF to join The Alliance.

Stone Cold Steve Austin, who had turned heel at WrestleMania X-Seven and formed an alliance with Mr. McMahon when he helped Austin win the WWF Championship, took a change in character during this time. Instead of being a beer-drinking redneck, he was more emotional and tried to cheer-up Mr. McMahon, who was clearly stressed from the threat of The Alliance, by doing something generous like giving McMahon a cowboy hat as a present. On the July 12 episode of SmackDown!, Austin played "Kumbaya" and "We Are the Champions" for McMahon, to which McMahon was unresponsive. Later that night, Mr. McMahon came out and asked Austin to come to the ring, announcing him as the man that would lead Team WWF into the Invasion pay-per-view and into victory. Upon entering, Mr. McMahon told Austin that he had changed quite a bit since WrestleMania, and when the WWF goes up against The Alliance at the upcoming pay-per-view, he did not need an Austin that gave him hugs and gifts and baked him cookies. He needed the "old" Stone Cold who was a "beer-swilling, foul-mouthed SOB" and the "old" Stone Cold that "didn't take shit from anyone". He asked Austin to knock him down, even yelling to the crowd, "If you want Stone Cold to beat the living hell out of Vince McMahon, give me a hell yeah!" to which the crowd responded enthusiastically. Austin, however, shook his head and proceeded to leave the ring, turning his back on Mr. McMahon. Later that night when Diamond Dallas Page and Shane McMahon went up against The Undertaker and Kurt Angle, many members of The Alliance interfered. Kane and Jericho came to help their team, but The Alliance's numbers were too many, and without Austin to back up his teammates, Team WWF was overwhelmed.

On the July 16 episode of Raw Is War, Austin was shown drinking and playing pool at a bar downtown. During the night, Mr. McMahon held a WWF meeting backstage. The Undertaker and the APA gave a motivational speech on how they should not tolerate The Alliance any longer. After they were finished, Brooklyn Brawler wheeled Freddie Blassie into the room so he could address the wrestlers and pump them up for the night. As the WWF wrestlers united, Austin could be seen watching the events on the television at the bar. He proceeded to slam his cue stick on the pool table and left.

Later that night, Diamond Dallas Page and Rhyno faced Kane and The Undertaker. During the match, there was interference from The Alliance. In response, The Hardy Boyz, the APA, Jericho, and Kurt Angle came to help their WWF allies, but more Alliance members came in and overwhelmed the WWF wrestlers. Backstage, many WWF and Alliance wrestlers were fighting each other, and the WWF seemed to be on the losing end of things. A truck was seen driving up to the arena, however, and Austin came out with his cue stick and proceeded to beat down any WCW and ECW wrestlers in his path. He then came to the ring, trash-talking on the way down, and beat down the Alliance wrestlers, giving Stunners to most of the men in the ring. The WWF wrestlers had cleaned house and were standing tall. The WWF seemed to be in good shape for the upcoming pay-per-view with Austin's return.

=== Invasion pay-per-view ===
At the Invasion pay-per-view, the "Inaugural Brawl" took place between Team Alliance and Team WWF. Team WWF consisted of Stone Cold Steve Austin, Kurt Angle, Chris Jericho, Kane, and The Undertaker, who all squared off against the team of Diamond Dallas Page, Booker T, Rhyno, and The Dudley Boyz. Near the end of the match, all of the wrestlers were outside of the ring except Booker T and Angle. Angle applied the ankle lock on Booker T, who tapped out, but no referee was there to witness it. Austin then dragged a referee into the ring, but in a swerve, kicked Angle in the head, hit him with a Stunner, and placed Booker T on top of Angle and told the referee to count. Team Alliance won the match due to Austin's betrayal of the WWF.

The next night, Austin claimed he joined the Alliance because they appreciated him. He cited Mr. McMahon's hugging of Angle and calling The Rock on the phone as signs that McMahon did not appreciate Austin and accused him of grooming Angle to be the next WWF Champion.

=== WWF gains momentum; Return of The Rock ===
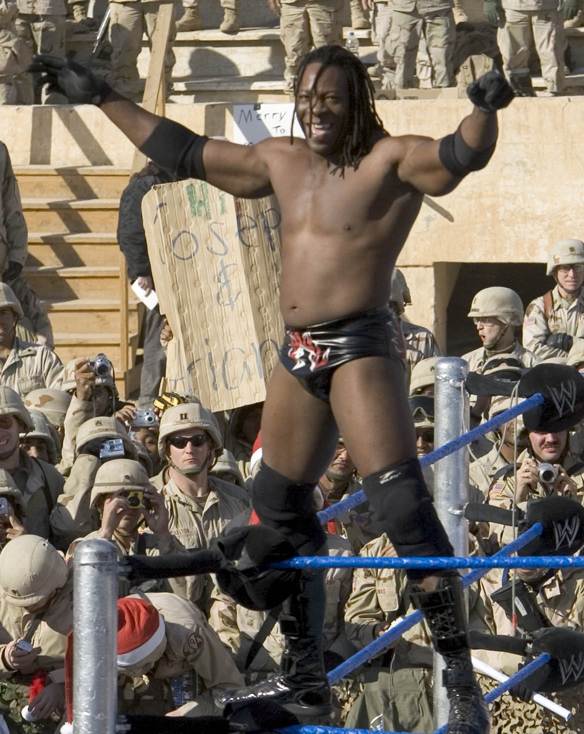
Booker T lost his WCW Championship to WWF wrestlers Kurt Angle and The Rock throughout the summer.

On the July 26 episode of SmackDown!, Shane McMahon extended an invitation to The Rock, who was serving a kayfabe suspension since the post-WrestleMania X-Seven edition of Raw Is War, to join The Alliance. Also that night, Kurt Angle challenged Booker T to a WCW Championship match, which Booker T accepted. The WWF gained momentum when Angle made Booker T submit with an ankle lock, taking the WCW Championship away from The Alliance.

Angle's WCW title run proved to be short-lived, as Booker T won it back on the July 30 episode of Raw Is War. On that same night, The Rock returned for the first time since the start of his kayfabe suspension on the April 2 episode of Raw Is War (in reality, he was given the "suspension" to take time off to film The Scorpion King). Shane, Stephanie, and Mr. McMahon were in the ring that night, trying to convince The Rock to join them. Shane reminded The Rock of how Mr. McMahon screwed him out of the WWF Championship earlier in the year at WrestleMania and also in a steel cage match the night after WrestleMania. Mr. McMahon conceded that it was wrong for him to back Austin, as he was a rattlesnake that he should have known would eventually bite him. He promised The Rock that he had no intention of screwing him if he returned to the WWF but also noted that he could not promise that he never would; if it was good for business, he said, then he just might do it. He told The Rock that he was at least being honest with him and pleaded for The Rock to trust him, stating that his future was with the fans and the WWF. The Rock gave Mr. McMahon a Rock Bottom, and proceeded to stare down Shane, then smiled and shook Shane's hand, faking a defection to The Alliance and a heel turn – but he then proceeded to Rock Bottom him as well and give him a People's Elbow, before emphatically asserting, "Finally, The Rock has come back... to the WWF." thus aligning himself with the WWF.

His return led to a WCW Championship match between The Rock and Booker T at SummerSlam, which The Rock won, marking the second time the WCW Championship belt changed sides to the WWF. At SummerSlam, Austin retained his WWF Championship against Angle after Angle won by disqualification.

The following Raw Is War and SmackDown! shows featured primarily inter-promotional matches between the two factions, with one notable match being a singles match between Chris Jericho and Hugh Morrus on the August 9 episode of SmackDown! in which the match ended with Jericho picking up the victory with a submission on Morrus, however Rhyno performed a post-match attack on Jericho in which Rhyno delivered his finishing move, The Gore, to Jericho which in turn destroyed a portion of the oval stage design (the following week's episode of SmackDown! would see the debut of the fist stage design in response to the destruction of the oval stage design). On the August 27 episode of Raw Is War, Austin stole Kurt Angle's medals, and on the August 30 episode of SmackDown!, tied them to a cinder block and threw them in a river. On the September 3 episode of Raw Is War, Debra and Stephanie bought a new truck for Austin, but Angle came up from behind and nailed Austin in the back of the head with a pipe. He put a cinder block and rope into the truck, place Austin in the vehicle, and drove away. He blindfolded Austin and threatened to throw him into a river if he did not get a title shot. Austin, fearful for his life, broke down in tears and agreed to give Angle a title shot at the upcoming pay-per-view, Unforgiven. Angle said, however, that Austin was "still going into the water", but instead simply embarrassed Austin by throwing him into a kiddie pool.

On September 11, 2001, four aircraft were hijacked and crashed into locations in Pennsylvania, Washington, D.C., and New York City. As a result, the Invasion storyline was temporarily paused on the September 13 live episode of SmackDown! held in Houston, two days after the attacks, where Alliance and WWF wrestlers joined in solidarity when Mr. McMahon gave a speech and ring announcer Lillian Garcia sang The Star-Spangled Banner. Following the September 11 terror attacks, the title of Raw Is War was shortened to Raw.

The WWF gained even more momentum at Unforgiven, as The Rock retained the WCW Championship in a handicap match against Booker T and Shane McMahon, and Kurt Angle made Austin submit to the ankle lock, winning the WWF Championship from Austin, putting both belts into the hands of the WWF.

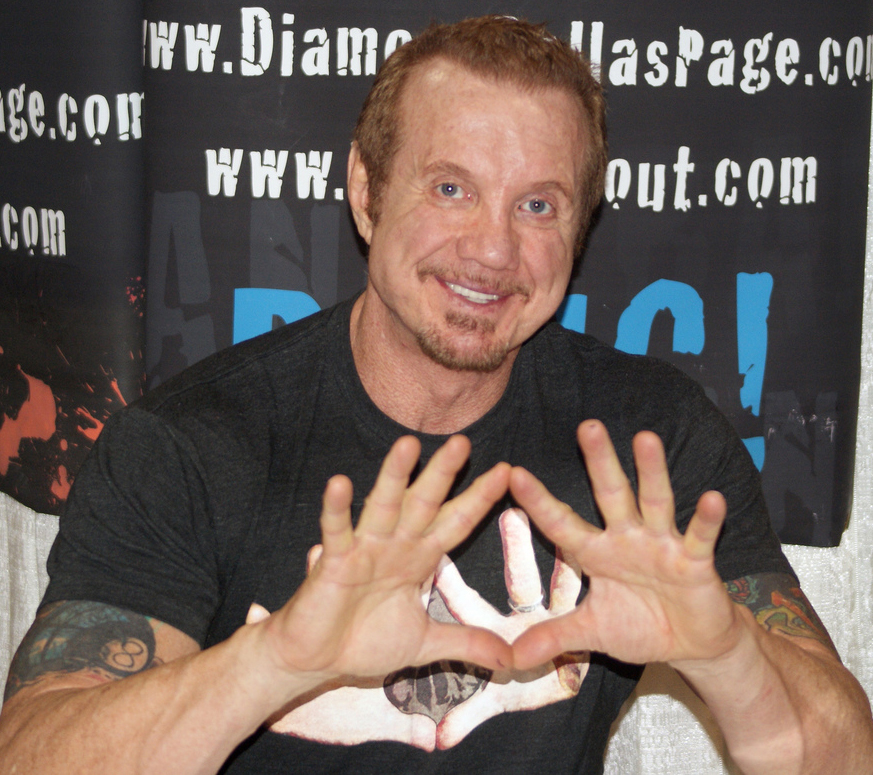
Diamond Dallas Page's feud with The Undertaker culminated in a loss against him in a tag team match at SummerSlam.

Almost every other championship had changed hands during this period of the storyline, being exchanged between WWF wrestlers and Alliance members. For example, The Undertaker and Kane beat Diamond Dallas Page and Chris Kanyon in a steel cage match at SummerSlam to become co-holders of both the WWF and WCW Tag Team titles. Also, X-Pac beat Billy Kidman to become a double champion, holding the WWF Light Heavyweight Championship as well as WCW Cruiserweight Championship.

=== The Alliance rebounds ===
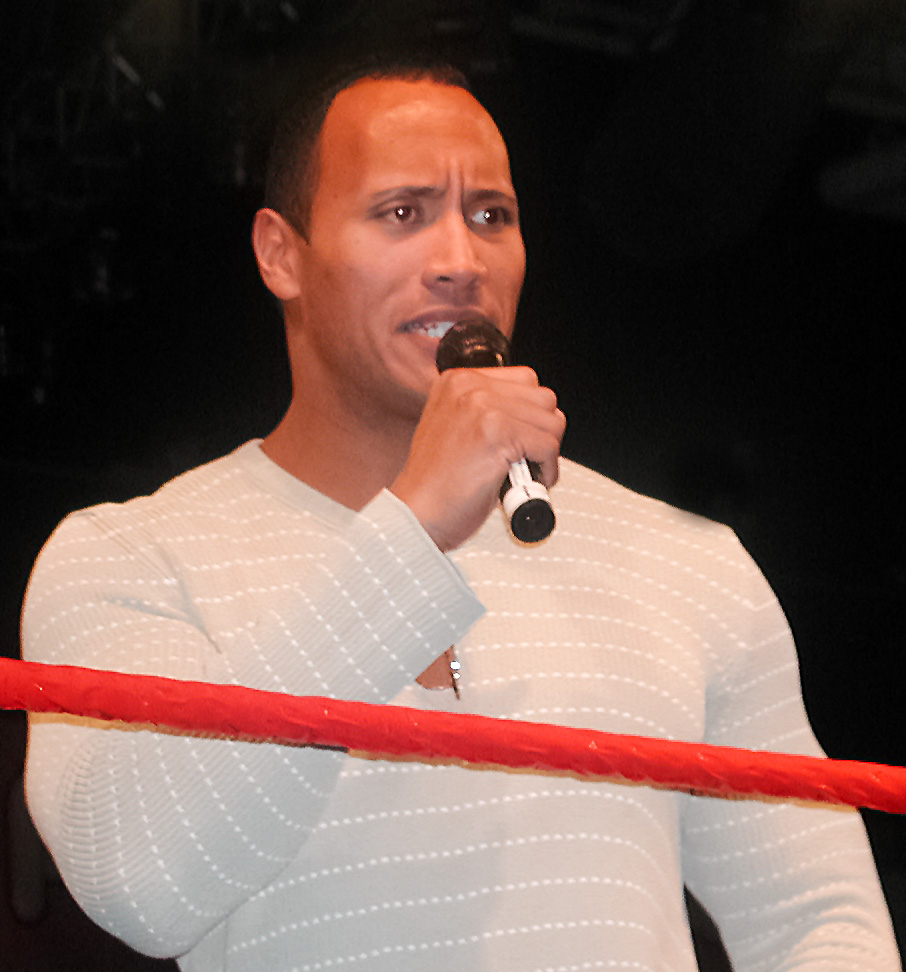
The Rock represented the WWF throughout the Invasion storyline.

There were several inter-promotional matches after Unforgiven. Furthermore, a crucial plot point formed when, on the October 8 airing of Raw, Chris Jericho and The Rock teamed up against Shane McMahon and Rob Van Dam. During the match, Jericho mistakenly struck The Rock with a steel chair, costing them the match. The Rock confronted Jericho backstage after the match, leading to a brawl between the two. The two of them began a feud, despite both remaining loyal to the WWF, during which they often tagged together, regularly hurled comedic insults together at ECW's Stephanie McMahon, and, at one point, won the WWF Tag Team Championship.

Also that night, Stone Cold Steve Austin and Kurt Angle faced off for the WWF Championship, and the WWF Commissioner William Regal, who sat at ringside to ensure a fair match would take place, hit Kurt Angle with the belt, thereby backstabbing the WWF and costing Angle the title. On the October 11 episode of SmackDown!, WWF CEO Linda McMahon promptly fired Regal from his position as WWF Commissioner, and named Mick Foley as his replacement. Regal, himself a former WCW employee, was then declared the Alliance Commissioner by Shane and Stephanie.

The feud between Jericho and The Rock built up to a match at No Mercy on October 21, where Jericho beat The Rock to win the WCW Championship (Jericho's first world title). Also at No Mercy, Stone Cold Steve Austin defeated Angle and Rob Van Dam to retain his WWF Championship.

On the October 29 episode of Raw, Shane McMahon told his father, Mr. McMahon, that a member of Team WWF would jump ship to The Alliance that night. Later that same night, Kurt Angle backstabbed the WWF by hitting Jericho, The Rock, The Undertaker, and Kane with steel chairs by joining The Alliance; ironically Angle intended to join ECW in 1996 but backed out due to the crucifixion incident. On the November 1 episode of SmackDown!, Angle, who originally led the WWF wrestlers, explained that he represented what is great about America — he was a winner, and his defection came from his decision to fight along the winning side. That side included Steve Austin, a man Angle claimed knew how to win.

=== Survivor Series 2001: End of The Invasion ===
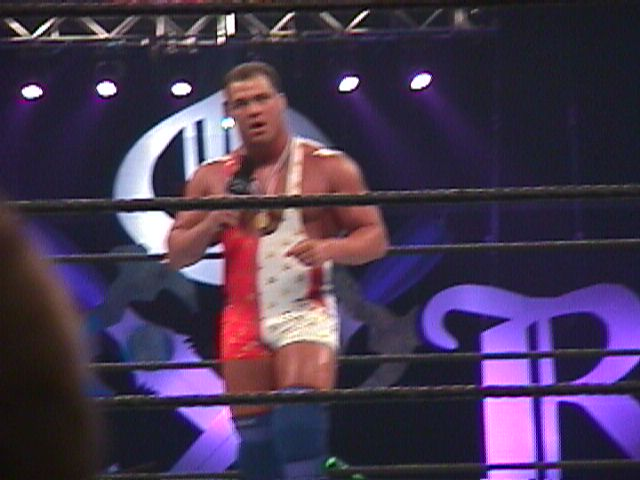
In a storyline swerve, Kurt Angle joined The Alliance, only to defect back to Team WWF at Survivor Series.

On the November 5 airing of Raw, Mr. McMahon countered Kurt Angle's defection by stating that a member of Team Alliance would defect during the Team WWF vs. Team Alliance match at the upcoming Survivor Series. Steve Austin came out to confront McMahon about it, and McMahon stated that Austin would be the one to defect. Because of this announcement, many Alliance members began to distrust Austin, who vehemently denied the charges and called McMahon a liar. Austin went on to interrogate members of Team Alliance, questioning Booker T and sitting Rob Van Dam down in a room with a light shining on him. That same night The Rock won the WCW Championship from Chris Jericho, but Jericho assaulted The Rock in the ring following the match.

All of this led to the "Winner Take All" match at Survivor Series, which pitted Team WWF (The Rock, Chris Jericho, The Undertaker, Kane, and Big Show) against Team Alliance (Stone Cold Steve Austin, Kurt Angle, Booker T, Rob Van Dam, and Shane McMahon). The final three men in the match were The Rock and Jericho vs. Austin. Jericho was eliminated and, to continue the feud between the two men, attacked The Rock with a Breakdown, even though Jericho's future was on the line if The Rock lost. The Rock and Austin continued to battle it out, each stealing and reversing their signature maneuvers and the referee was knocked down in the match. Austin hit a Stunner on The Rock and pinned him, but there was no referee to count it. Austin approached the downed referee to try to revive him. As this was occurring, Angle ran to the ring, picked up the WWF Championship belt, and nailed Austin with it, revealing himself to be the defector to which Mr. McMahon was referring to the entire time. The Rock got up to his feet and followed this with a Rock Bottom and a pin on Austin, to which the referee woke up and groggily counted the three count. Team WWF prevailed, thus ending the storyline.

It was also on this night that several titles were unified; Edge defeated Test to unify the WCW United States Championship and the WWF Intercontinental Championship, while The Dudley Boyz beat The Hardy Boyz in a steel cage match to unify the WCW Tag Team Championship with the WWF Tag Team Championship. The final member of The Alliance, ECW's Jazz, made her debut during a Six Pack Challenge match for the vacant WWF Women's Championship, which was won by Trish Stratus.

== Aftermath ==
=== Fallout after Survivor Series ===
Alliance member Test won a battle royal at Survivor Series that featured both Alliance and WWF wrestlers battling for the right to be immune from termination for a year, regardless of which side won in the event's "winner take all" match. Over the next several weeks Test began using that immunity to his advantage, attacking and bullying other wrestlers for no reason and often assaulting referees. Whenever he would be called on it, he would bring up his immunity from being fired. Shortly after Survivor Series, however, Test's immunity storyline was eventually forgotten and dropped.

The immunity was also extended to any Alliance member who held a championship at the conclusion of Survivor Series. Stone Cold Steve Austin, who was the WWF Champion, The Dudley Boyz, who held the WWF Tag Team Championship, Rob Van Dam, who was the WWF Hardcore Champion and Christian, who was the WWF European Champion, also were safe from termination. Of these wrestlers, everyone except Rob Van Dam (who was already cheered by fans despite being a member of The Alliance) remained heels after the dissolution of The Alliance. Also receiving immunity from The Alliance was Stacy Keibler, the manager of The Dudley Boyz, and Tazz, who was a commentator on SmackDown! and had been kicked out of The Alliance several weeks prior.

On the Raw the night after Survivor Series, WWF Commissioner Mick Foley resigned. Mr. McMahon celebrated his (assumed) complete and sole ownership of the WWF and his final victory over The Alliance. Immediately, McMahon began making those who were allied with the Alliance to answer for their supposed betrayal of WWF. McMahon first kayfabe fired Paul Heyman as commentator (in reality, Heyman was given a new backstage role within the company, thus his 'firing' was an excuse to write him off from WWF television), leading to Heyman to first brawl with his now former partner Jim Ross before being carried out by WWF security. McMahon then announced the return of Jerry "The King" Lawler as commentator, making his first appearance back in WWF since quitting the company after the Raw Is War episode that followed No Way Out in February. Vince then ordered Shane and Stephanie McMahon to come to the ring to answer for their actions. While Shane calmly accepted defeat and left the ring with no incident, Stephanie cried and begged for Vince to take her back, leading Vince to order WWF security to throw her out as well. Stephanie would return to WWF television the following month whilst Shane made a small brief appearance on the July 15, 2002 episode of Raw and would then return full-time to television in 2003. At this point, Vince started to go on a power trip by announcing the creation of his infamous "Kiss My Ass" club, where he was going to force former Alliance members to literally kiss his bare buttocks in order to keep their jobs, with the first victim being former Alliance commissioner, William Regal. McMahon would soon start forcing any WWF employees, whether they were former Alliance members or not, to kiss McMahon's buttocks to keep their jobs.

McMahon also announced that he would strip Alliance leader Steve Austin of his WWF Championship and would reward it to Kurt Angle, who earlier that night had portrayed himself as the "hero of Survivor Series" and bragged about his actions in an egotistical matter to other face wrestlers, to which they all gave him negative reactions. This led to an upset Angle telling McMahon that nobody thanked him and appreciated him for his actions the previous night, leading to McMahon telling Angle that he would be honored to reward him the WWF Championship. In doing so, McMahon and Angle completed slow heel turns that had begun at the beginning of the night.

Before McMahon could announce Angle as his new champion, Ric Flair (who was making his return to the WWF after leaving in January 1993) announced that he "bet on a winner" at Survivor Series. When pressed, Flair revealed to McMahon that he was not in fact the sole owner of the WWF as he had originally thought. When Shane McMahon and Stephanie McMahon had bought WCW and ECW earlier in the year they had sold their shares in the WWF to "a consortium", but the "consortium" was actually Flair himself, making him half-owner of the WWF and now McMahon's business partner.

Immediately after Flair made his declaration, Austin made his return and attacked Angle for costing him the win at Survivor Series against The Rock and also attacked Mr. McMahon for attempting to strip him of his title, ending the heel run he had begun at WrestleMania. He turned face by aligning himself with Flair and reclaiming his WWF Championship belt.

=== WCW ===
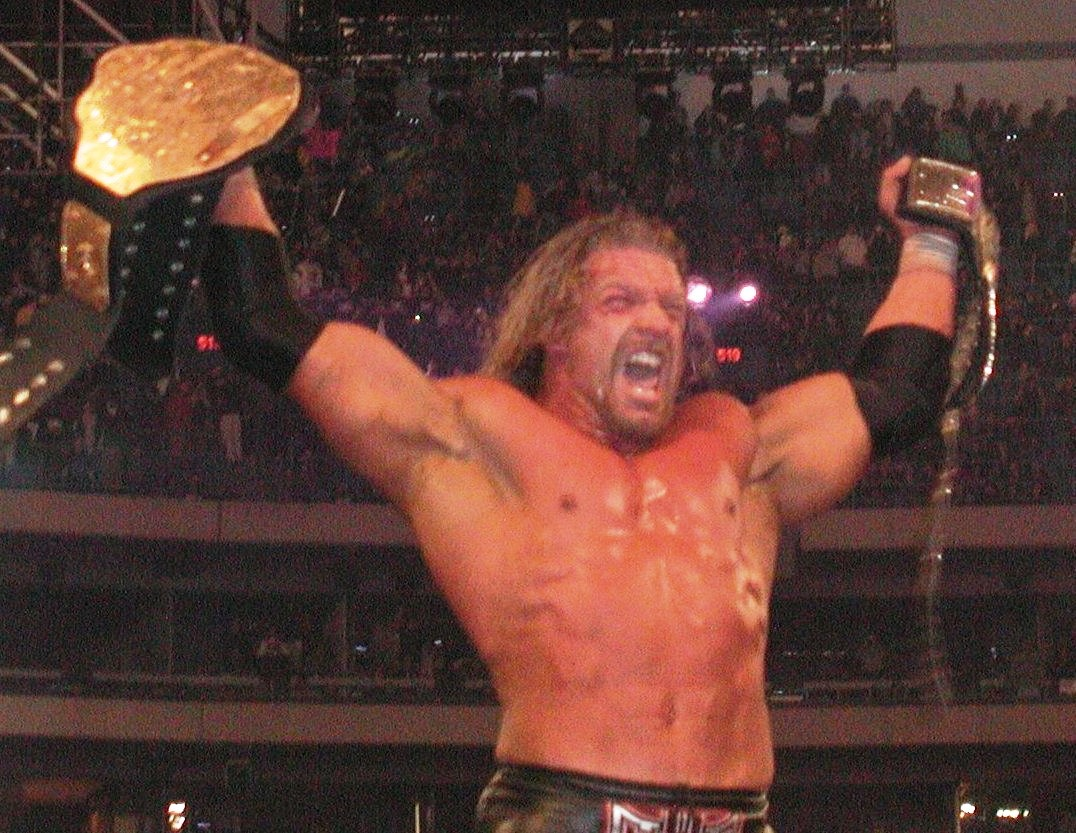
The WCW Championship was later unified with the WWF Championship to form the Undisputed WWF Championship, which Triple H won at WrestleMania X8 in March 2002 after defeating Chris Jericho.

During the Invasion storyline, the WWF determined that they had too many championships, due to them acquiring WCW's championships, and felt that each individual title became devalued. To combat this, the WWF began to unify many championships. Survivor Series saw two title unification matches: WCW United States Champion Edge defeated Test to become the WWF Intercontinental Champion, retiring the United States title, while WCW Tag Team Champions The Dudley Boyz defeated The Hardy Boyz to win the WWF Tag Team Championship, retiring the WCW tag titles. The following month at Vengeance, the WCW Championship (renamed to simply the World Championship after Survivor Series) was unified with the WWF Championship in which Chris Jericho became the champion by defeating both The Rock and Steve Austin in a three-match tournament to form the Undisputed WWF Championship, which continued the lineage of the WWF Championship, while the World Championship was retired. Another WCW championship, the WCW Cruiserweight Championship, was rebranded as a WWF title (and later, WWE) and replaced the WWF Light Heavyweight Championship in 2002.

The Undisputed Championship was originally represented by both the original WWF and WCW title belts, and the champion would carry both belts around until it was replaced with a single belt the following year on the April 1 edition of Raw. At the beginning of the WWE brand extension, the Undisputed Champion would appear on both Raw and SmackDown! until then-champion Brock Lesnar signed an exclusive deal with SmackDown! after his victory over The Rock at 2002's SummerSlam, thus making the championship exclusive to the brand. In response, then-Raw General Manager Eric Bischoff, former Senior Vice President of WCW, introduced the World Heavyweight Championship, represented by the former WCW Championship belt, and awarded it to Triple H, who was the number one contender for the Undisputed title. The Undisputed Championship would be renamed to the WWE Championship, as it was no longer undisputed since there were two world championships in the promotion. On the June 19, 2003 edition of SmackDown!, the United States Championship was revived as a SmackDown!-exclusive title, thus becoming the WWE United States Championship (and counterpart to Raw's Intercontinental title) — it is the only active title currently in WWE to not have originated in the promotion.

Although the WWF acquired all of WCW's championships, several were never used following the purchase of WCW, such as the WCW Cruiserweight Tag Team Championship, WCW Hardcore Championship, and the WCW World Television Championship (in which the latter was retired a year before WCW went out of business). Jim Ross made a passing mention of the WCW Hardcore Championship at the Invasion pay-per-view when mentioning all the titles Lance Storm had held in WCW, but the title never appeared on WWF programming during the storyline.

=== ECW ===
Although Tazz briefly appeared on WWF television with the ECW World Heavyweight Championship in 2000 (while under contract with the WWF), none of ECW's titles were shown on WWF television during the Invasion angle due to ECW's assets being held up in bankruptcy court; the renamed WWE eventually purchased ECW's assets in 2003. Although the WCW brand effectively died once and for all following the end of the Invasion storyline, ECW was temporarily revived by WWE in 2005 for the purposes of a special reunion show, ECW One Night Stand, held on June 12, 2005. The build-up to this one-off event featured former ECW talent putting over the virtues of the brand versus the WWE product and appearances by several former ECW wrestlers not under contract to WWE. In 2006, it was announced that WWE would be reviving ECW as its third brand (to complement Raw and SmackDown!). The second One Night Stand, held on June 11, 2006, led to the official debut of the new ECW the following Tuesday. Rob Van Dam was awarded the ECW World Heavyweight Championship (later renamed to the ECW Championship) for his WWE Championship victory over John Cena, thus officially reviving the title for the ECW brand while also becoming the only wrestler to hold the ECW and WWE titles simultaneously. This was the only ECW title to be reactivated by WWE for the ECW brand. The brand would continue to operate until February 2010, when it was announced by Vince McMahon that ECW would be replaced by a new series for young wrestlers titled NXT, which eventually took the place of Florida Championship Wrestling as WWE's developmental territory. The ECW Championship was retired when the ECW brand was disbanded.

=== Launch of the WWF brand extension ===
In early-to-mid-2002, the WWF underwent a process they called the "brand extension". As part of the brand extension process, the WWF divided itself into two de facto wrestling promotions (referred to as "brands") with separate rosters, storylines, and authority figures. Raw and SmackDown! would host each division, give its name to the division, and essentially compete against each other. The split came about as a result of the aftermath of The Invasion storyline, as the WWF purchasing their two biggest domestic competitors, WCW and ECW, led to the WWF roster and amount of championships doubling in size. The brand extension was publicly announced by WWF President and CEO Linda McMahon during a telecast of Raw on March 25 and became official the next day.

At the time of the brand extension's launch, the WWF Undisputed Championship, which came into existence when the WWF Championship and WCW Championship were unified, and the WWF Women's Championship were the only titles that would be defended on both brands. In September 2002, then Undisputed Champion Brock Lesnar refused to defend the title for Raw, in effect causing his title to become exclusive to SmackDown!. The following week on an episode of Raw, Raw General Manager and former WCW Senior Vice President Eric Bischoff awarded a newly instated World Heavyweight Championship, represented by the same Big Gold Belt that was used to represent the WCW Championship, to Raw's designated number one contender Triple H. Because the Undisputed Championship was now a SmackDown! exclusive title, it was no longer referred to as "undisputed". Following this, the Women's Championship soon became a Raw exclusive title as well. As a result of the brand extension, an annual "draft lottery" was instituted to exchange members of each roster and generally refresh the brands' lineups. ECW would later be relaunched as a WWE brand and take part in the promotion's draft lotteries; WCW would not be relaunched as a WWE brand and instead would be succeeded by the Raw and SmackDown! brands. ECW would be replaced by the NXT brand in 2010, while Evolve, based on the former professional wrestling promotion of the same name, was relaunched as a fourth brand in 2025, as a pathway developmental brand for new WWE recruits.

== Reception ==
The Invasion angle was a large storyline that spanned for almost half of 2001 and brought about financial success for the WWF, such as the Invasion pay-per-view having one of the highest non-WrestleMania event buyrates in the history of WWF pay-per-views. However, the Invasion storyline has come under criticism by wrestling fans and wrestling media, with the storyline being called "a flop". Media sources have referred to the storyline as "one of the most poorly handled, ego-filled storylines in wrestling history". In 2001, The Invasion storyline won the Wrestling Observer Newsletter Worst Feud of the Year award.

=== Perceived weakness of The Alliance ===
Throughout the storyline, many inter-promotional matches had WWF wrestlers winning over WCW and ECW wrestlers, usually cleanly. In contrast, most of The Alliance's wins were controversial due to interference or disqualification. For example, it took Tazz assisting Raven at the Invasion pay-per-view to beat WWF undercarder William Regal. The Rock, however, beat WCW Champion Booker T cleanly at SummerSlam, despite Shane McMahon's assistance to Booker T. It has been speculated that the reason for The Alliance appearing weak was because WWF's real-world owner Vince McMahon wanted the WWF to look strong while fighting The Alliance, as he worked very hard to put down his competition, especially WCW.

WCW Wrestler Kevin Nash said WCW wrestlers "weren't allowed to get over," and added that WWF "bastardized and beat everybody who came over [to the WWF]." SLAM! Wrestling alleged that The Alliance members were purposely made to look poorly in comparison to the WWF wrestlers:

Portrayed as disorganized and inferior grapplers, the ECW-WCW Team had more than its fair share of mistimed moves which hurt their own team members while the "WWF squad" of course wrestled like a well-oiled machine. The weakening of the ECW-WCW dubbed superstars didn't stop there either. The WWF faction battered their enemy tag partners off the ring apron over and over again making them appear weak and more times than not, the ECW-WCW grapplers gained an advantage only by double-teaming or employing underhanded tactics. The message sent was loud and clear. The "best" of ECW-WCW is not good enough to hang with the WWF.

=== Focus on the McMahons ===
The Invasion storyline was presented with a backdrop of a McMahon family feud. In the storyline, the WWF was owned by Vince McMahon, WCW was owned by Shane McMahon, and ECW was owned by Stephanie McMahon. Although the feud did not center completely around the McMahons, the family feud storyline had been done many times before on WWF programming and was viewed as "tainting" the Invasion angle. The McMahons allegedly got more airtime than the WCW and ECW wrestlers did during the course of the storyline.

In addition to this, the Steve Austin versus Vince McMahon feud, which had already been the most prominent storyline in the WWF during the Attitude Era, comprised much of the Invasion storyline. Many critics felt that this storyline was "played out" and hurt the uniqueness of The Invasion.

As stated by a SLAM! Wrestling synopsis of No Mercy, a pay-per-view that occurred during the Invasion storyline:

For fans who didn't catch it the fifth, tenth or twentieth time they've run the angle, "Stone Cold" Steve Austin and Vince McMahon are about to feud once again... First up was Vincent McMahon labelling Austin with a steel chair as he was waiting to put a dazed RVD away... Three minutes later, it was Shane McMahon's turn to hurl Kurt Angle out of the ring and into a steel ring post. Vince tackled Shane over the announce table and the two began pummeling one another. Back in the ring, Austin laid a "Stone Cold" Stunner on to retain the belt as a disgruntled Vince scowled. Gee, how many times have we seen that scenario play itself out before? Austin wins. Vince fumes. Fans snore. Whatever.

=== Lack of major WCW and ECW talent ===
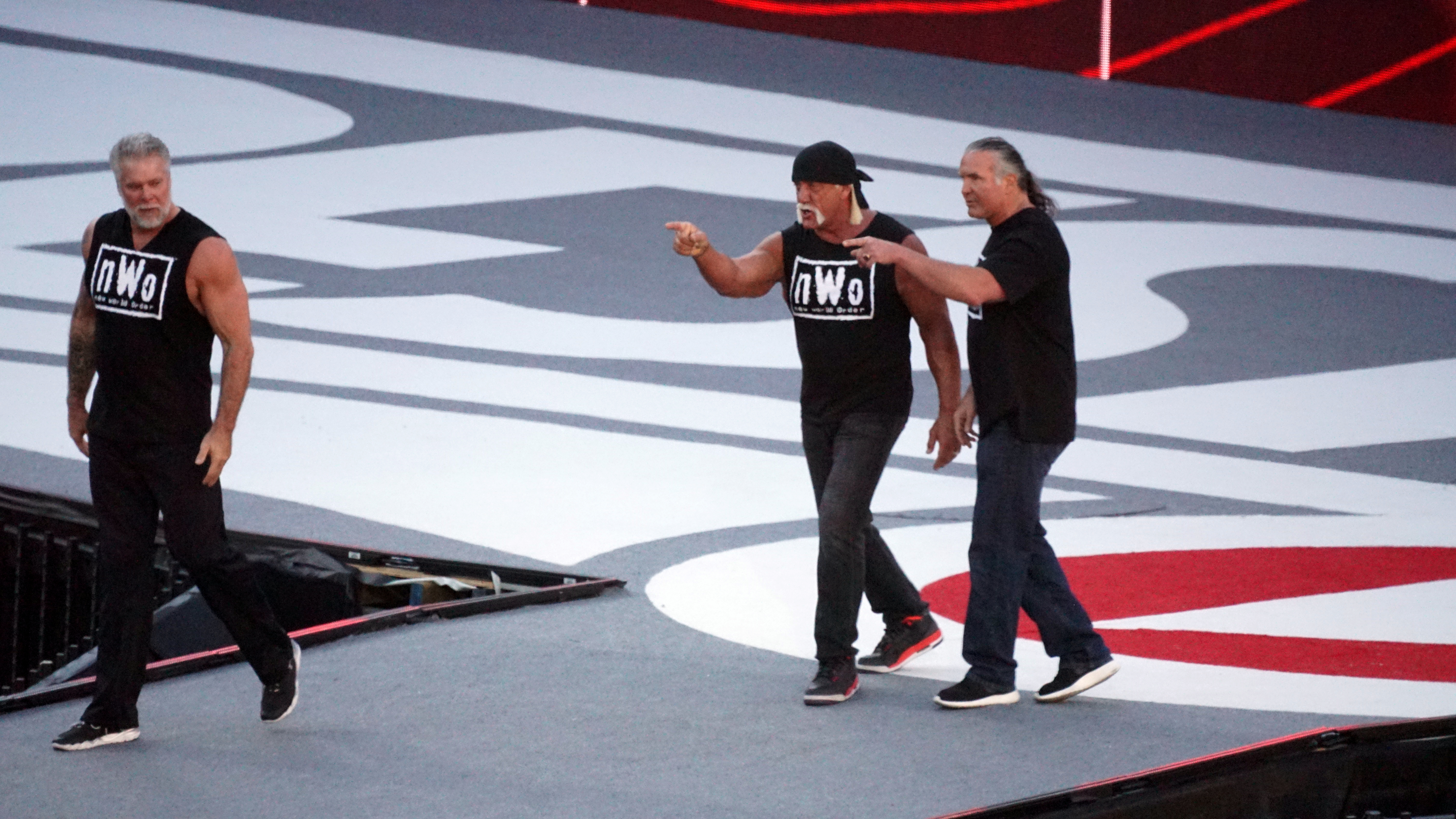
The nWo (Kevin Nash, Hollywood Hogan and Scott Hall) did not sign with the WWF until early 2002, a few months after the Invasion storyline concluded.

Many wrestling fans had dreamed of a day where they would see WWF and WCW wrestlers compete against each other, but the Invasion storyline's final match ended with four WWF wrestlers wrestling. On TSN's Off the Record, host Michael Landsberg asked Booker T why the Invasion – which he stated should have been one of the biggest money angles in wrestling history – was in his words a failure on pay-per-view. Booker T responded:

That wasn't the true WCW. I mean, we didn't have guys like Goldberg. We didn't have Sting. We didn't have Kevin Nash. We didn't have all the major players in the WCW to face the WWF superstars.

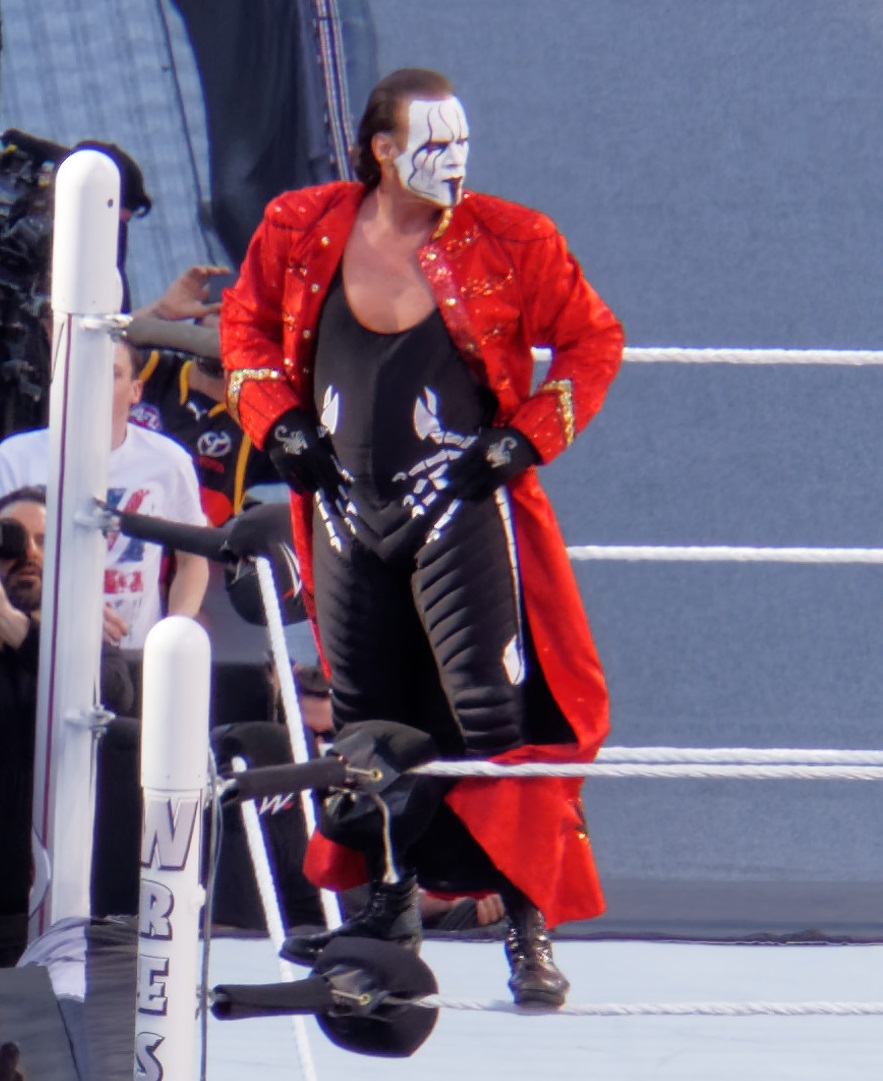
WCW mainstay Sting wrestled his first WWE match at WrestleMania 31 in 2015.

Some of the WCW wrestlers' absences were partly out of the WWF's control. Many of WCW's top wrestlers had contracts with AOL Time Warner, WCW's parent company, and were willing to sit at home rather than wrestle for less money; Booker T, the reigning WCW Champion at the time of WWF's purchase, was a notable exception, agreeing to a buyout of the remainder of his contract with AOL Time Warner in order to wrestle for the WWF immediately. Vince McMahon had the option of taking on any contract he wanted with his purchase, but chose to let AOL Time Warner continue to pay out what he considered bad deals. Notably, Ric Flair and Rey Mysterio Jr. were signed once their AOL Time Warner contracts expired, debuting after the Invasion storyline ended. In addition, former WCW Champion Scott Steiner was recovering from an injury, though it was unlikely that he was going to be signed by the WWF in 2001 if healthy due the WWF's concerns about Steiner's unprofessional backstage behavior. Steiner would later join WWE in October 2002. Others, such as Hollywood Hogan, Kevin Nash, Scott Hall, and Goldberg, were not signed until well after the storyline finished. In an interview with RF Video, Nash said he was set to make $2.4 million on his Time Warner contract. The offer WWF gave, according to Nash, was half of that ($1.3 million), plus $750,000 as a downside guarantee. Nash said, "And if I go on the road and bust my fucking ass, I might be able to make back to where I was if I sit at home, watch TV and smoke pot. Gee, let me think?"

Hogan, Nash, and Hall would make their returns to the company, as the nWo, at 2002's No Way Out, and then the following year, Goldberg made his WWE debut on March 31 on Raw the night after WrestleMania XIX. As for WCW's other top wrestlers, Sting remained under contract to AOL Time Warner until March 2002, and did not join WWE until late 2014, while Lex Luger and Randy Savage never reappeared on WWF/WWE television. In May 2011, Luger rejoined WWE in a backstage role related to the company's Wellness Program, while Savage, who had filmed promotional footage for the WWE All Stars video game earlier in the year, died of a sudden heart attack later the same month. Bret Hart, who made his name in the WWF but was last seen wrestling for WCW, eventually retired from wrestling due to a concussion he suffered in a match with Goldberg at Starrcade in December 1999 and was estranged from Vince McMahon after the 1997 Montreal Screwjob; he would eventually return to WWE weekly programming in 2010, having been inducted into the WWE Hall of Fame four years prior in 2006. Jeff Jarrett, despite his contract being with WCW rather than AOL Time Warner, was another missing name as he was legitimately and publicly fired during the Raw/Nitro simulcast owing to disputes between Jarrett and McMahon that were not settled until 2018. In 2018, Jarrett returned to WWE, eventually becoming the company's Senior Vice President of Live Events. In 2022, Jarrett departed WWE and joined rival promotion All Elite Wrestling (AEW), becoming AEW's Director of Business Development. Due to the absence of these major stars, The Alliance allegedly lacked the strong identity of WCW.

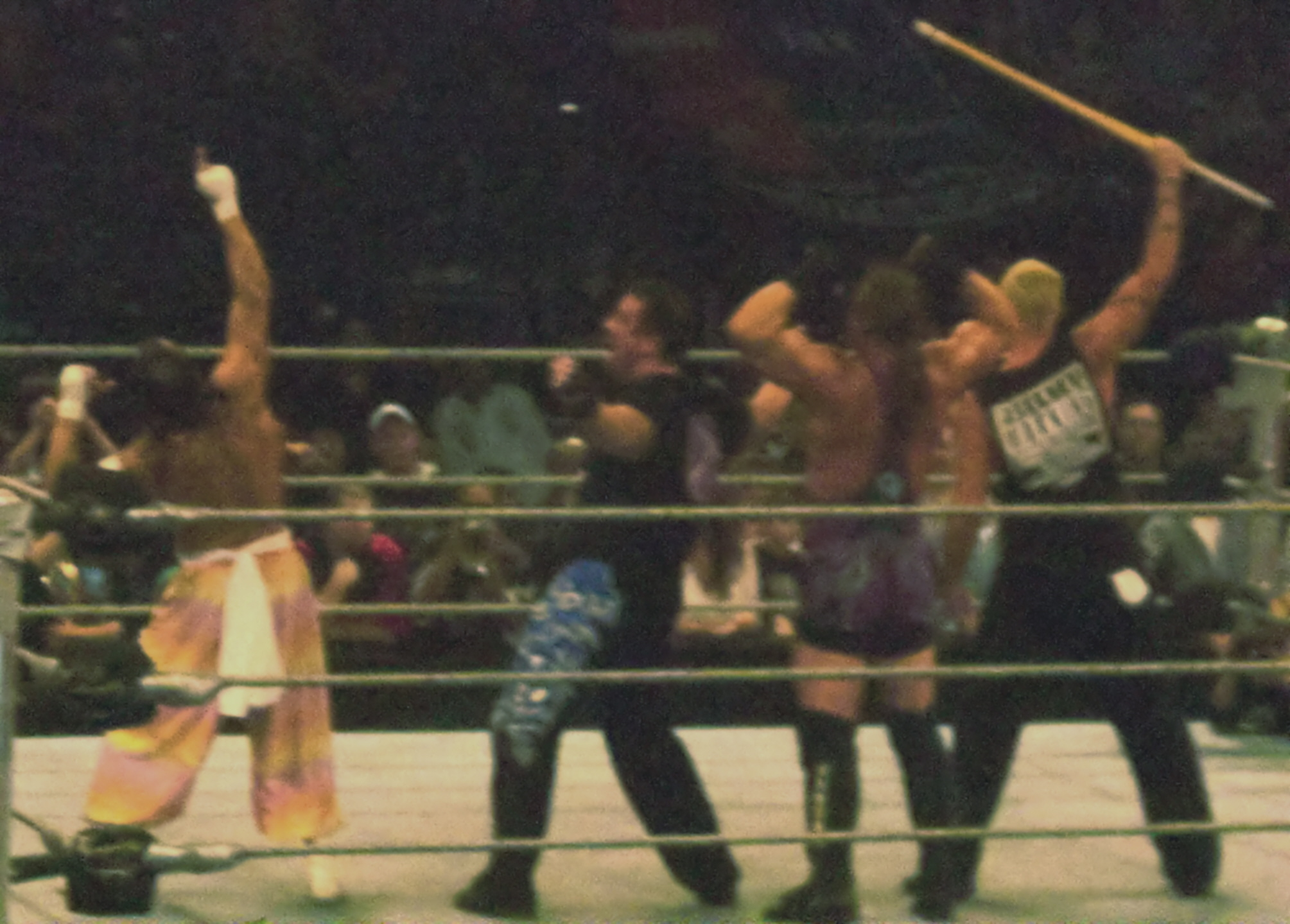
Many ECW Originals did not sign with WWE until the ECW brand officially launched in 2006.

In correlation with WCW, ECW was also missing most of their key wrestlers such as The Sandman, Sabu, Balls Mahoney, Little Guido, and Tony Mamaluke (all of whom would later join WWE's relaunched ECW). Other ECW wrestlers such as Shane Douglas, Masato Tanaka, Terry Funk, New Jack, Steve Corino, and Mikey Whipwreck also did not participate in the storyline and would never go on to wrestle for the WWF/WWE on a full-time basis. During The Invasion storyline, the usage of the "ECW" name on-air was subjected to dispute as ECW's assets were still being debated in bankruptcy court. The WWF's use of ECW's theme song "This Is Extreme!" during The Invasion storyline led to legal action by Harry Slash & The Slashtones, the singers of the song. In January 2005, WWE purchased The Slashtones' catalog, two years after they had purchased ECW's assets in bankruptcy court.

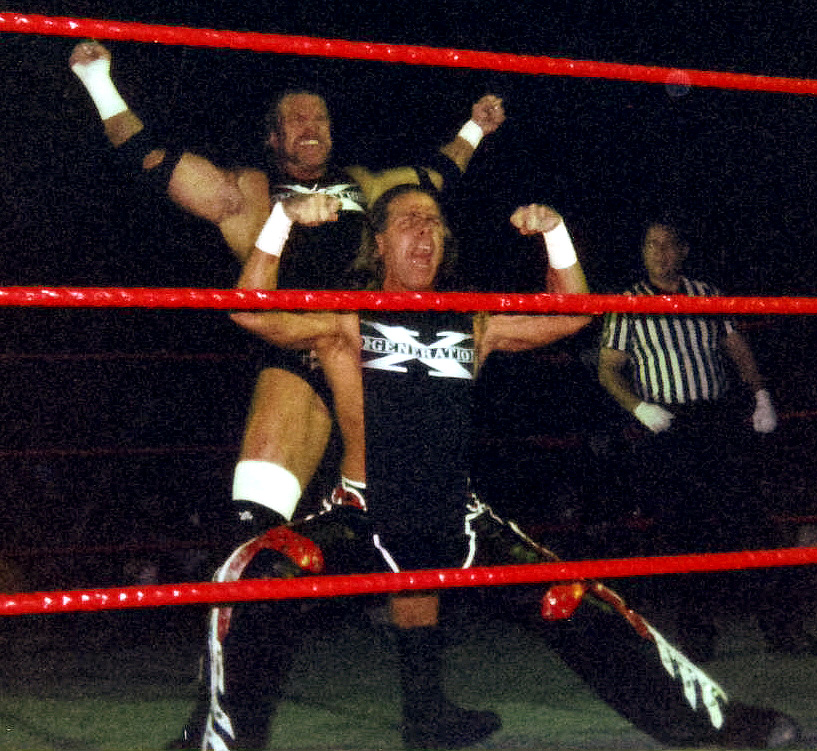
Triple H and Shawn Michaels did not appear in The Invasion storyline as Triple H was injured and Michaels was also on hiatus. Both men returned to competition in 2002.

The WWF itself would be missing some of its biggest stars, most notably Triple H, who tore his left quadriceps muscle on the May 21 episode of Raw Is War, weeks before the start of the storyline and would not return until the following year on the January 7 episode of Raw, however he would not compete again until the January 17 episode of SmackDown! in a tag match and would also go on to win the Royal Rumble main event a few days later at Royal Rumble, well after The Invasion angle ended. Shawn Michaels was on a hiatus, initially referred to as a retirement, from wrestling during The Invasion storyline and did not reappear in WWE until after the storyline concluded. Rikishi and Big Boss Man were inactive throughout the entire storyline, and both men did not return to the WWF until December 2001. Eddie Guerrero and Chris Benoit who were both former WCW and ECW wrestlers, working for WWF at the time, were also absent from the storyline. Benoit was hinted to defect to WCW before his injury in June 2001 at King of the Ring. Guerrero was also hinted to defect to WCW but was sent to rehabilitation to deal with an addiction to painkillers in May 2001 before being released that November. Both Guerrero and Benoit would not return to the company until April and May 2002, respectively. Dean Malenko and Perry Saturn, who were Benoit and Guerrero's former stablemates from The Radicalz were absent from the storyline as well, with Malenko officially retiring from professional wrestling in July 2001 while Saturn was involved in a shoot incident during a Jakked/Metal taping and was minimally involved in the storyline; whenever Saturn appeared on match cards during the storyline, it was indicated that he was aligned with the WWF side.

=== Overemphasis on WWF defectors ===
In lieu of signing big WCW names, to bolster the ranks of WCW, some WWF wrestlers (such as Stone Cold Steve Austin) defected and joined The Alliance, often being pushed as the leaders of the group. Austin, who had worked in WCW and ECW but had found his greatest success in the WWF and was seen primarily as a WWF wrestler, was pushed as the leader of The Alliance and a more important player during the Invasion than the bona fide WCW or ECW members of The Alliance. Several top WCW and ECW talents who were main event wrestlers in their previous companies, such as Diamond Dallas Page, Mike Awesome, Justin Credible, Raven and Tazz, were put down into low-mid card matches, while lesser-ranked WWF wrestlers who defected to The Alliance, such as Test and Christian, were given a greater push. Sting would cite these lack of pushes for WCW and ECW wrestlers as the reason he did not initially sign with McMahon's organization despite being offered a contract.

Adam Copeland, known as Edge in the WWF, says this period of time was when he thought that the quality of the writing deteriorated and when he saw empty seats in arenas for the first time. In an interview with Inside the Ropes, Copeland said that he and tag team partner Christian were going to split up, but that angle was postponed once the Invasion storyline began. That angle was delayed until further into the Invasion storyline, in which Copeland stated in the interview:

It got turned into a, right, Christian will turn on Edge but he'll be a part of WCW. Huh? How is the guy who's only ever been in the WWF a WCW guy? That happens throughout the show and now it just doesn't really make sense, and I think the fans sensed that. And it's that time that I think a lot of people lost interest.

In the final match between The Alliance and the WWF at Survivor Series, The Alliance was represented by five wrestlers. Three of these were WWF wrestlers who had defected. Two members of the teams, Shane McMahon and Kurt Angle, had never wrestled a match for WCW or ECW prior to the Invasion. Only three wrestlers on the team (Austin, Booker T, and Rob Van Dam), including the WWF defectors, had worked in WCW or ECW. McMahon, Booker T, and Rob Van Dam were the first three wrestlers eliminated on the Alliance's team, resulting in the last survivors representing the ostensible WCW/ECW entity being two wrestlers who were already working for the WWF prior to the Invasion. This overemphasis on WWF wrestlers was widely cited by critics as a reason for The Invasion storyline's "failure". In contrast to most critics, Smash Wrestling welcomed the use of WWF wrestlers in The Alliance, claiming that WWF wrestlers were needed to defect to make The Alliance appear as a credible threat due to the decline of the WCW and ECW products prior to their closures.
