= Groin (disambiguation) =

For Groin see:

- Groin (human body)
- Groin attack (technique)
- Groyne (sea wall or river training structure)
- Groin vault, a type of vaulted chamber in medieval architecture
