= O'Leary Manager 2000 =

2000 video game

- Cover art
- Developer: LiveMedia
- Publisher: Ubi Soft
- Platform: Game Boy Color
- Release: NA: September 15, 2000; UK: January 12, 2001
- Genres: Sports, simulation
- Modes: Single-player, multiplayer

O'Leary Manager 2000 is a football player-manager game developed by LiveMedia and published by Ubi Soft released in 2000 for the Game Boy Color. The player can choose whether they want to focus on the management side of football, play the matches themselves on the game's 2D match engine, or combine the two features for a more in-depth experience. It is endorsed by Irish football manager David O'Leary, who was managing English Premier League side Leeds United at the time of the game's release. The game was released as Guy Roux Manager 2000 in France, DSF Fußball Manager in Germany, Co Adriaanse Football Manager in the Netherlands and Barça Manager 2000 in Spain.

== Gameplay ==
=== Management ===
The management side of O'Leary Manager 2000 is very comprehensive when compared to similar Game Boy Color games. The player can choose from 240 fully licensed teams from the top two leagues in England, France, Italy, Spain, Germany and the Netherlands to play as or manage, with each team having 16 players in their squad. There is also the option to promote a number of fictional youth team players. However, most of the youth team players are of low ability, so could only realistically be used for back-up when managing a decent quality team.

As with any football management game, the transfer market can play a key role in whether the team achieves success. The player's selected team starts with either 10.5m or 5.5m to spend, depending on whether they were in the first or second tier of their country's football hierarchy. The player can also recoup some money by selling players to other teams. This is done by first offering the footballer for sale at a chosen price, from which interested clubs would then place offers that the player may choose to accept. The values of footballers alternate greatly during the game, with the then Real Betis striker Denílson being the most expensive player at the start of the game. A bug in the game allows the player to gain a huge sum of money (around 70m) if the club goes into a certain amount of debt.

The club's board of directors give assessments as to how they think the club is progressing via a short statement visible at the menu screen. Other features available the menu screen include options to change the team line-up, formation and tactics.

Similarly, the player can decide what methods of training the team will undertake for the coming week. There is the option to "do training", which generally increase players' statistics (but at the risk of injuring them), or to concentrate on fitness training (which helps players stay fit and injured players to recover quicker). Alternatively, the manager may choose to skip training entirely for the week.

=== Playing ===
The playing side of the game is similar in style to Sensible Soccer and Kick Off; offering a 2D, top-down perspective on the match. It has been praised for this style, as it values successful gameplay more than impressive graphics.

It is relatively simple to play, with the D-pad used for moving the selected player, and the "A" and "B" buttons used to shoot and pass respectively. Holding the button down will increase shot power, but will decrease accuracy. The player can also apply curl to the ball by pressing left or right on the D-pad after the ball is hit. Pressing the "start" button allows playing a short replay of the previous action in slow motion or real-time match speed.

=== Competitions ===
In both player and manager roles, the chosen teams will participate in a number of competitions. This includes the domestic league (e.g. La Liga), where around 20–24 teams will compete through the year to gain the highest points total possible, therefore gaining the highest league position. Domestic cup competitions feature heavily as well, with teams from both leagues of the selected country competing in a knock-out competition. If a team achieves a high league position, they will enter European competitions. The top teams will enter the UEFA Champions League with a select number of teams below them entering the UEFA Cup.

Although the cup competitions in O'Leary Manager 2000 are not officially licensed (i.e. "Domestic Cup" instead of "FA Cup and "Euro Cup" instead of "UEFA Champions League"), they follow the same rules and structure of the competitions they represent.

=== Multiplayer ===
O'Leary Manager 2000 allows the player to compete in a one-off match against another person, either as a player, a manager or both. This is done by connected both Game Boys together using a Game Link cable, as long as both users have the game's cartridge installed.

== Development ==
The game was developed by Oxford-based LiveMedia UK Ltd, with the playing mode using an updated version of the Total Soccer engine from the same studio.

== Reception ==
The game received largely positive reviews.

It was scored as 92% in Game Boy Official Magazine, with the review describing it as "class on grass" and the "only game you'll ever need....for action packed football on the go". It received a 9/10 in GAME - The Game Boy Color Magazine, with the review praising both the management and match play modes as "comprehensive". 64 Magazine's Mike Richardson praised the playing mode as reminiscent of a "handheld version of Sensible Soccer", awarding a score of 90%.

In a 2014 retrospective review, Mikey Traynor of Balls.ie called O'Leary Manager 2000 "a great game, and one that should be played by far more people." It has been described as "easily the best football game on Game Boy".
