= SummerSlam (2001) =

World Wrestling Federation pay-per-view event

- Promotional poster featuring The Rock
- Promotion: World Wrestling Federation
- Date: August 19, 2001
- City: San Jose, California
- Venue: Compaq Center at San Jose
- Attendance: 15,293
- Buy rate: 570,000
- Tagline: Finally

Pay-per-view chronology
← Previous; Invasion	Next → Unforgiven

SummerSlam chronology
← Previous; 2000	Next → 2002

The 2001 SummerSlam was a professional wrestling pay-per-view (PPV) event produced by the World Wrestling Federation (WWF, now WWE). It was the 14th annual SummerSlam and took place on August 19, 2001, at the Compaq Center at San Jose in San Jose, California. This was the last SummerSlam held before the introduction of the brand extension in March 2002 and the last promoted under the WWF name, as the promotion was renamed to World Wrestling Entertainment (WWE) in May 2002.

In the main event, The Rock defeated Booker T for the WCW Championship, after executing a Rock Bottom. The other two main matches on the card were "Stone Cold" Steve Austin versus Kurt Angle for the WWF Championship, which Angle won after Austin was disqualified for attacking referees, and Rob Van Dam defeated Jeff Hardy in a ladder match for the WWF Hardcore Championship. The other main match on the undercard was the Winners Take All Steel Cage match between WCW Tag Team Champions The Brothers of Destruction (The Undertaker and Kane) and WWF Tag Team Champions Diamond Dallas Page and Kanyon, which The Undertaker and Kane won after The Undertaker executed the Last Ride and pinned Page to win both titles.

== Production ==
=== Background ===
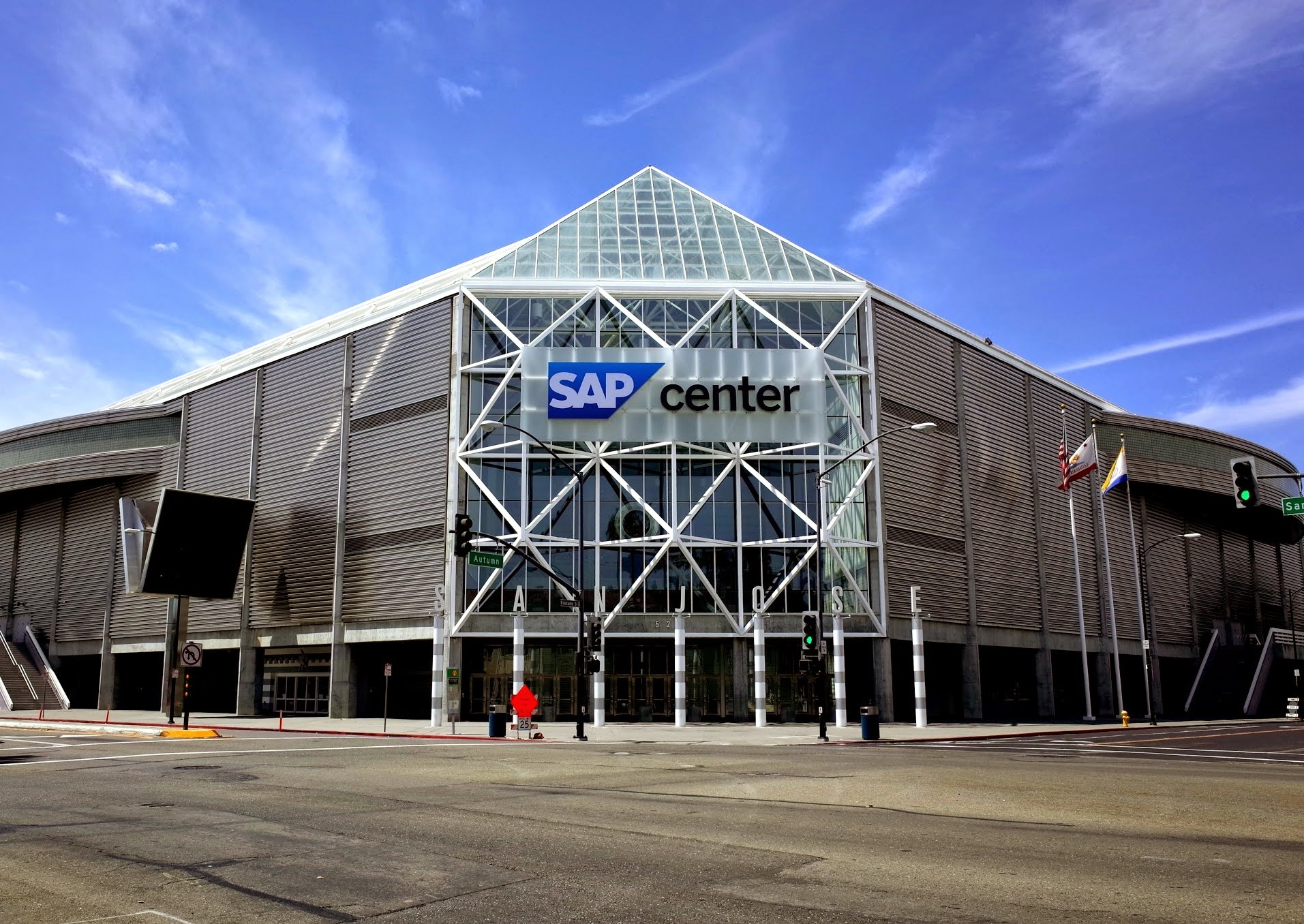
The event was held at the Compaq Center in San Jose, California.

SummerSlam is an annual professional wrestling pay-per-view (PPV) event produced every August by the World Wrestling Federation (WWF, now WWE) since 1988. Dubbed "The Biggest Party of the Summer", it is one of the promotion's original four pay-per-views, along with Royal Rumble, WrestleMania, and Survivor Series, referred to as the "Big Four", and was considered one of the "Big Five" PPVs with the addition of King of the Ring in 1993. It has since become considered WWF's second biggest event of the year behind WrestleMania. The 14th SummerSlam event was scheduled to be held on August 19, 2001, at the Compaq Center at San Jose in San Jose, California.

=== Storylines ===
The main rivalry heading into SummerSlam was between The Rock and Booker T, battling over the WCW Championship. After losing the WWF Championship to "Stone Cold" Steve Austin at WrestleMania X-Seven, The Rock took a hiatus from professional wrestling to film the movie The Scorpion King. On the July 9 edition of Raw Is War, campaigning for The Rock's return began. Following the campaigning, The Rock returned to the WWF on the July 30 edition of Raw Is War, where he chose to align himself with the WWF instead of The Alliance for The Invasion. This action was shown by The Rock delivering a Rock Bottom and the People's Elbow onto Shane McMahon, The Alliance leader. Later that week on SmackDown!, Booker T and The Rock cut a promo, where Booker T challenged The Rock to a match at SummerSlam; the beginning of the Rock-Booker T rivalry. Seeking revenge for the attack from the previous week, McMahon fought The Rock in a Street Fight on the August 6 edition of Raw Is War, where The Rock pinned McMahon. The rivalry between The Rock and Booker T intensified after the match, where Booker T and Shane McMahon double-teamed The Rock. Later that week on SmackDown!, in retaliation, The Rock accepted Booker T's challenge. On the August 13 edition of Raw Is War, The Rock was involved in a tag team match, where he teamed with Chris Jericho in a loss to Booker T and Rhyno. After the match, Booker T delivered his variation of the Rock Bottom on The Rock, a move dubbed, The Book End. On the final edition of SmackDown! before SummerSlam, McMahon announced that Booker T would defend the WCW Championship at SummerSlam against The Rock. Later that night, the rivalry continued to intensify during a Lights Out match between Booker T and The Rock, after Booker T delivered a Book End onto The Rock through a commentators announce table.

The other main match on the card was "Stone Cold" Steve Austin versus Kurt Angle for the WWF Championship. The previous month at Invasion, Team WCW/ECW (Booker T, Diamond Dallas Page, Rhyno and Bubba Ray and D-Von Dudley) defeated Team WWF (Austin, Angle, Chris Jericho, The Undertaker and Kane). Team WCW/ECW won after Austin turned on the WWF when he executed a Stunner on Angle. On the following night's edition of Raw Is War, Austin stated that he did this because he felt that Vince McMahon was grooming Angle to take over his spot, and that he was "unappreciated" when McMahon insisted he return to the old Austin. Later that evening, Austin interfered during a six man Elimination Tables match by assaulting Angle. Then on the July 26 edition of SmackDown!, Angle appeared in his hometown of Pittsburgh and challenged Austin for the WWF Championship but Austin instead chose Booker T to defend his WCW Championship against Angle. Later on that night, Angle won the WCW Championship from Booker T despite Austin's interference. On the July 30 edition of Raw Is War, Angle lost the WCW Championship back to Booker T with the help of Austin and Shane McMahon. Afterwards, Angle challenged Austin for the WWF Championship at SummerSlam, which Austin accepted. The feud between Austin and Angle would escalate in the following couple of weeks leading up to SummerSlam especially in a Six Man Tag Team Elimination match pitting Austin and the Dudley Boyz against Angle and The Hardy Boyz, which Austin and the Dudley Boyz won.

Another main match heading into the event was Jeff Hardy versus Rob Van Dam in a Ladder match for the WWF Hardcore Championship. At Invasion Van Dam defeated Hardy to win the Hardcore Championship. In the following weeks, Van Dam and Hardy faced each other in Tag Team matches. On the August 13 edition of Raw, Van Dam was scheduled to defend his title against Kurt Angle, and as the match was underway, Hardy interfered and pinned Van Dam to win the title for himself. This led to a Ladder match for the title at SummerSlam between Hardy and Van Dam.

== Event ==
Other on-screen personnel
Role:	Name:
Commentator	Jim Ross
Commentator	Paul Heyman
Commentator	Carlos Cabrera (Spanish)
Commentator	Hugo Savinovich (Spanish)
Interviewer	Lilian Garcia
Interviewer	Michael Cole
Ring announcer	Howard Finkel
Referee	Mike Chioda
Referee	Jim Korderas
Referee	Earl Hebner
Referee	Jack Doan
Referee	Tim White
Referee	Theodore Long
Referee	Chad Patton
Referee	Brian Hebner
Referee	Charles Robinson

Before the event began, a dark match took place on Heat. The match was originally a handicap match featuring Lita and Jacqueline against Torrie Wilson, Stacy Keibler, and Ivory. Backstage, Wilson, Ivory and Keibler attacked Lita, preventing her from competing. Molly Holly replaced Lita. Lita performed the Twist of Fate on Ivory, allowing Jacqueline to pin her for the win.

=== Preliminary matches ===
The event opened with Lance Storm defending the WWF Intercontinental Championship against Edge. Storm applied the Canadian Crab on Edge but Edge countered and applied the Canadian Crab on Storm. Storm threw Edge into the referee to escape the hold. Christian interfered, attempting a Spear on Storm but Storm avoided the move and Christian performed a Spear on Edge. Storm performed a Superkick on Christian and pinned Edge for a near-fall. Edge performed an Edgecution on Storm to win the title.

Next, The Dudley Boyz (Bubba Ray Dudley and D-Von Dudley) and Test faced The APA (Faarooq and Bradshaw) and Spike Dudley. Spike attempted a Dudley Dog on Test but Test countered by throwing Spike through a table. Bradshaw performed a Clothesline from Hell on Test but the referee checked on Spike. Shane McMahon hit Bradshaw with a steel chair, allowing Test to pin Bradshaw to win the match.

After that, WCW Cruiserweight Champion X-Pac faced WWF Light Heavyweight Champion Tajiri. Albert interfered, leading to Tajiri attacking Albert with red mist. X-Pac performed the X-Factor on Tajiri to win the match.

Next, Chris Jericho faced Rhyno. Jericho forced Rhyno to submit to the Walls of Jericho to win the match.

After that, Jeff Hardy defended the WWF Hardcore Championship against Rob Van Dam in a Ladder match. Hardy attempted to retrieve the title belt but Van Dam pushed the ladder, causing Hardy to fall into the ring ropes. Van Dam retrieved the title belt to win the title.

In the sixth match, WCW Tag Team Champions The Brothers of Destruction (The Undertaker and Kane) faced WWF Tag Team Champions Diamond Dallas Page and Chris Kanyon in a Steel Cage match for both titles. Page attempted to escape the cage but The Undertaker performed a Chokeslam on Page. The Undertaker performed a Last Ride on Page to win the match.

In the seventh match, "Stone Cold" Steve Austin defended the WWF Championship against Kurt Angle. Austin performed a Stone Cold Stunner on Angle for a near-fall. Austin performed a second Stone Cold Stunner on Angle, causing Angle to roll out of the ring. Angle applied the Ankle Lock on Austin but Austin touched the ring ropes, forcing Angle to break the hold. Austin applied a Cobra Clutch on Angle but Angle ran forwards, causing Austin to roll out of the ring. Austin performed a third Stone Cold Stunner on Angle for a near-fall. Angle performed an Angle Slam on Austin for a near-fall. Austin attacked the WWF referee and Angle performed a DDT on Austin for another near-fall. Austin attacked Angle with a low blow and performed a Stone Cold Stunner on another WWF referee. Austin hit another WWF referee with the title belt and ran into Angle, who performed an Angle Slam on Austin. Angle pinned Austin but another referee, This time Alliance referee Nick Patrick stopped the count to disqualify Austin for excessive abuse towards the referees. Angle won by disqualification but Austin retained the title. After the match, Angle applied the Ankle lock on Patrick.

=== Main event ===
In the main event, Booker T defended the WCW Championship against The Rock. The Rock applied the Sharpshooter on Booker T but Shane McMahon distracted the referee. The Rock attacked McMahon, allowing Booker T to perform a Superkick on The Rock for a near-fall. The Rock performed a Catapult into an exposed turnbuckle on Booker T and performed a DDT on Booker T for a near-fall. Booker T distracted the referee by trying to retrieve a steel chair placed in the ring by McMahon, allowing McMahon to hit The Rock with the title belt. The APA appeared, with Bradshaw performing a Clothesline from Hell on McMahon in retaliation for McMahon costing the APA their six-man tag team match. Booker T performed a Book End on The Rock for a near-fall. The Rock performed a Spinebuster and a People's Elbow on Booker T but McMahon pulled the referee out of the ring, voiding the pinfall. The Rock performed a Rock Bottom on McMahon outside the ring. Booker T performed a Scissors Kick on The Rock and performed the Spinarooni. However; The Rock quickly got up with a kip-up, and performed a Rock Bottom on Booker T to win the WCW Championship, his seventh World Championship overall and first WCW Championship reign.

== Reception ==
In 2013, Dylan Diot of 411Mania gave the event a rating of 8.5 [Very Good], writing, "This was a damn good edition of Summerslam. Nothing on the show was bad and two of the matches were absolutely outstanding. [This] show is well worth a watch, especially for Angle's memorable performance and another classic ladder match. The Invasion angle may have [sucked], but at least the effort in the ring was great."

== Aftermath ==
This was the last SummerSlam to occur before the introduction of the first brand extension in March 2002, which split the roster between the Raw and SmackDown! brands where wrestlers were exclusively assigned to perform. It was also the last SummerSlam event to occur under the WWF name, as the promotion was renamed to World Wrestling Entertainment (WWE) in May 2002. Additionally, King of the Ring was discontinued as a PPV following its 2002 event, thus SummerSlam, along with WrestleMania, Royal Rumble, and Survivor Series, reverted to being called the "Big Four" until October 2021 when Money in the Bank was recognized as one of the "Big Five".

With the WWF's purchase of rival company World Championship Wrestling (WCW) back in March, some of their titles became defended on WWF programming. As such, the 2001 event was the only SummerSlam to feature the WCW Championship, as the title was unified with the WWF Championship at December's Vengeance event with the latter being renamed to Undisputed WWF Championship. It was also the only SummerSlam to feature the WCW Tag Team Championship, which was unified with the WWF Tag Team Championship at Survivor Series in November. It was also the first SummerSlam to feature the WCW Cruiserweight Championship and the last to feature the WWF Light Heavyweight Championship, which was dropped in March 2002 in favor of continuing the Cruiserweight Championship, which was rebranded as a WWF title.

== Results ==
No.	Results	Stipulations	Times
1^{H}	Jacqueline, Lita, and Molly Holly (WWF) defeated Ivory, Stacy Keibler, and Torrie Wilson (Alliance)	Tag team match	2:55
2	Edge (WWF) defeated Lance Storm (c) (Alliance)	Singles match for the WWF Intercontinental Championship	11:16
3	The Dudley Boyz (Bubba Ray Dudley and D-Von Dudley) and Test (Alliance) defeated The APA (Bradshaw and Faarooq) and Spike Dudley (with Molly Holly) (WWF)	Six-man tag team match	7:18
4	X-Pac (Cruiserweight) defeated Tajiri (Light Heavyweight)	Winner Takes All match for the WCW Cruiserweight Championship and WWF Light Heavyweight Championship	7:33
5	Chris Jericho (WWF) defeated Rhyno (with Stephanie McMahon-Helmsley) (Alliance) by submission	Singles match	12:34
6	Rob Van Dam (Alliance) defeated Jeff Hardy (c) (WWF)	Ladder match for the WWF Hardcore Championship	16:31
7	The Brothers of Destruction (Kane and The Undertaker) (c - WCW) (with Sara) (WWF) defeated Diamond Dallas Page and Chris Kanyon (c - WWF) (Alliance) by pinfall	Winners Take All Steel Cage match for the WCW Tag Team Championship and WWF Tag Team Championship	10:17
8	Kurt Angle (WWF) defeated "Stone Cold" Steve Austin (c) (Alliance) by disqualification	Singles match for the WWF Championship	22:20
9	The Rock (WWF) defeated Booker T (c) (with Shane McMahon) (Alliance)	Singles match for the WCW Championship	15:18
(c) / – the champion(s) heading into the match; H / – the match was broadcast prior to the pay-per-view on Sunday Night Heat
