= Low Blows (podcast) =

Wrestling podcast

- Podcast artwork showcasing hosts of both SmackJade and Raw in Fast Forward
- Genre: Comedy; Professional Wrestling; Critique
- Language: English

Cast and voices
- Hosted by: Rick Nash; Jade Costello; David Kent

Production
- Production: Rick Nash
- Length: 60–90 minutes

Technical specifications
- Audio format: Podcast (via streaming or downloadable M4A or MP3)

Publication
- Original release: April 2014 – On hiatus as of April 5, 2017
- Updates: Twice-weekly (currently on hiatus)

Related
- Website: iTunes

Low Blows was an Irish podcast series centred around professional wrestling critique, hosted by retired professional wrestler Rick Nash of Irish Whip Wrestling. The show has been on indefinite hiatus as of their 170th episode in 2017. The brand released two shows weekly, SmackJade (co-hosted with professional wrestler Jade Costello) and Raw in Fast Forward (co-hosted with Cork City F.C. commentator and sports columnist David Kent).

The promotion, under the sub-name Low Blows Wrestling Parties, hosted regular wrestling-themed parties in Dublin which follow WWE's pay-per-view schedule, specifically Royal Rumble, WrestleMania, SummerSlam and Survivor Series. They also hosted bi-annual live podcasts in Dublin.

== History ==
Low Blows began in April 2012 as an entity specifically tailored towards hosting WWE pay-per-view parties at Captain America's restaurant in Dublin. Then called WWE Parties Ireland, the budding company began as a Facebook page out to be '"a hub for wrestling fans to chat & have a laugh", and also provided a platform to promote independent wrestling shows around the country from brands such as Main Stage Wrestling and Celtic Championship Wrestling. At this stage, future host Rick Nash would begin to provide his own insights and critique on the WWE product via his wrestling blog, through which he would also announce details of future events hosted by the company.

In April 2013, following their second successful WrestleMania party, the company began to host their own 'Hall of Fame' ceremony (mimicking the WWE Hall of Fame Ceremony carried out during the weekend of WrestleMania each year). It was at this stage that the popularity of the events began to outweigh the capacity of Captain America's, and as a result future events were announced to be staged in Woolshed Baa and Grill on Parnell Street, Dublin.

Following continued success, Nash's critical articles garnered the attention of Irish sports outlet Balls.ie, who offered Nash a position as their professional wrestling correspondent beginning in June 2013. Through this position, Nash was able to extend the reach of the events through pay-per-view prediction leagues in his articles, the winner of which would be given complimentary access to a future event. Competitions were also able to be held throughout relevant news outlets, further promoting the brand and its events.

In April 2014, in anticipation of their first WrestleMania event at the Woolshed venue, the first episode of Low Blows was released hosted by Nash and Don Marnell (now commentator for OTT Wrestling), an inductee of the company's hall of fame from the year prior.

In February 2016, in an effort to distance themselves away from WWE and cultivate the Low Blows brand established with the podcast and their Twitter handle, the company was officially rebranded to Low Blows Wrestling Parties, introducing new branding to their events as of WrestleMania 32.

In June 2016, the company hosted a campaign on behalf of a five-year-old Max Birmingham, who was then suffering from a relapse of stage four neuroblastoma cancer. Because of his fascination with wrestling, Max's mother contacted the company asking for any spare memorabilia that people could give while Max is in treatment as a means of distraction from his treatment. In response, the company's Money in the Bank party was labelled with #MemorabiliaForMax, and there was a collection of toys made to be donated to Max.

== Format ==
Low Blows was presented as 2 separate weekly shows, SmackJade and Raw in Fast Forward. SmackJade was hosted by Nash and professional wrestler Jade Costello, and focused on wrestling news that had transpired over the course of the week. Raw in Fast Forward is hosted again by Nash and sports persona David Kent, and offers a more in-depth view of WWE programming with a specific focus on Raw and SmackDown Live.

Both shows, while offering a critical view on the world of professional wrestling, were maintained in a lighthearted manner, often employing comedic bits which are segmented throughout the show and rely on audience participation. Segments included 'Dave's Mystery PPV' (a segment where listeners must guess an unidentified pay-per-view through a series of clues) and '30 second warning' (a segment where listeners ring in to face off against the hosts in an attempt to win tickets to a future event).

During live podcasts, the format would typically follow a panel style where the audience asks questions to the hosts and any special guests they might have featured. On establishing the live podcasts, Marnell stated "Six months ago, Rick Nash approached me about co-hosting a wrestling comedy podcast -a niche market you might say. Here we are 20 episodes later and we are preparing to host our first live episode in front of an audience. Has anyone hosted a live comedy wrestling podcast before Probably not, but we're going to give it a bash anyway!"

== Pay-Per-View parties ==
The origins of Low Blows lie within the WWE pay-per-view parties hosted during the 'big four' pay-per-view events Royal Rumble, WrestleMania, SummerSlam and Survivor Series. These were initially held at Captain America's restaurant on Grafton Street before being moved to Woolshed Baa and Grill due to capacity issues. As of 2017, the parties have again been moved to Buskers on the Ball due to legal issues following the 2017 Royal Rumble.

Each year, usually preceding their WrestleMania party, the company hosts their own 'Hall of Fame' ceremony in the style of WWE's Hall of Fame.

2017 marked the first time a live band appeared preceding one of the company's events. The Low Blows Band, a house band curated by the hosts of the podcast, performed a full concert based around wrestler's theme songs prior to their WrestleMania 33 party.
