= No Mercy (2001) =

World Wrestling Federation pay-per-view event

- Promotional poster featuring Kurt Angle
- Promotion: World Wrestling Federation
- Date: October 21, 2001
- City: St. Louis, Missouri
- Venue: Savvis Center
- Attendance: 15,647
- Buy rate: 325,000

Pay-per-view chronology
← Previous; Unforgiven	Next → Rebellion

No Mercy chronology
← Previous; 2000	Next → 2002

The 2001 No Mercy was a professional wrestling pay-per-view (PPV) event produced by the World Wrestling Federation (WWF, now WWE). It was the fourth No Mercy and took place on October 21, 2001, at the Savvis Center in St. Louis, Missouri. It was the final No Mercy held before the introduction of the brand extension in March 2002 and also the final No Mercy held under the WWF name as the promotion was renamed to World Wrestling Entertainment (WWE) in May 2002.

The main event was a Triple Threat No Disqualification match—a match involving three competitors against each other and it would be decided only through pinfall or submission. The match was contested for the WWF Championship. "Stone Cold" Steve Austin defended the title against Kurt Angle and Rob Van Dam. Austin pinned Van Dam after a Stone Cold Stunner to retain the title.

The undercard featured The Rock versus Chris Jericho for the WCW Championship, The Undertaker versus Booker T, The Dudley Boyz (Bubba Ray Dudley and D-Von Dudley) versus Big Show and Tajiri for the WWF Tag Team Championship, Christian versus Edge in a Ladder match for the WWF Intercontinental Championship, Torrie Wilson versus Stacy Keibler in a Lingerie match, Test versus Kane, and The Hardy Boyz (Jeff Hardy and Matt Hardy) versus Lance Storm and The Hurricane for the WCW Tag Team Championship.

== Production ==
=== Background ===
No Mercy was first held by the World Wrestling Federation (WWF, now WWE) as a United Kingdom-exclusive professional wrestling pay-per-view (PPV) event in May 1999. A second No Mercy was then held later that same year in October, but in the United States, which established No Mercy as the annual October PPV for the promotion. The fourth No Mercy event was held on October 21, 2001, at the Savvis Center in St. Louis, Missouri.

=== Storylines ===
No Mercy featured professional wrestling matches that involved different wrestlers from pre-existing feuds, plots, and storylines that were played out on Raw and SmackDown!—the WWF's television programs.

The predominant rivalry heading into the event was between "Stone Cold" Steve Austin, Kurt Angle, and Rob Van Dam. At Unforgiven, Angle defeated Austin to win the WWF Championship. On the October 4 edition of SmackDown!, Van Dam defeated Angle to earn Austin a WWF Championship match against Angle. On the October 8 edition of Raw, Austin defeated Angle to win the WWF Championship, with the help of the WWF Commissioner William Regal, who turned on Angle and the WWF by helping Austin in winning the title. As a result, Regal joined The Alliance. On the October 11 edition of SmackDown!, the WWF CEO Linda McMahon fired Regal from his position of WWF Commissioner and replaced him with a new Commissioner. Later that night, Van Dam lost a match to Chris Jericho after interference by Austin. As a result, Van Dam confronted Austin. The new Commissioner was revealed to be Mick Foley, who appeared at the spot and announced that Austin would defend the WWF Championship against Van Dam and Angle in a Triple Threat match at No Mercy. On the October 21 edition of Heat, Foley announced that the Triple Threat match would be contested under no disqualification rules.

Another major rivalry heading into No Mercy was between The Rock and Chris Jericho over the WCW Championship. On the October 8 edition of Raw, WCW Owner Shane McMahon announced that he would team with Rob Van Dam against Jericho and The Rock in a tag team match. Van Dam pinned The Rock after Jericho accidentally nailed The Rock with a chair shot. After the match, The Rock confronted Jericho in a backstage segment where Jericho attacked The Rock. On the October 11 edition of SmackDown!, Jericho defeated Van Dam to become the #1 contender for the WCW Championship at No Mercy.

At Unforgiven, Christian defeated Edge to win the WWF Intercontinental Championship. Edge's eye was badly injured in the match. On the September 27 edition of SmackDown!, Edge tried to attack Christian during his Intercontinental Championship match against Bradshaw but Christian escaped. On the October 1 edition of Raw, Edge interrupted Christian and X-Pac while they were insulting the fans and insulted both of them. This led to Christian and X-Factor (X-Pac and Albert) attacking Edge, until Acolytes Protection Agency (Faarooq and Bradshaw) rescued Edge from the attack. On the October 4 edition of SmackDown!, Edge and the APA defeated Christian and X-Factor in a six-man tag team match. On the October 8 edition of Raw, it was announced that Christian would defend the Intercontinental Championship against Edge in a Ladder match at No Mercy. On the October 18 edition of SmackDown!, Alliance Commissioner William Regal added Christian as the newest member of The Alliance.

On the September 27 edition of SmackDown!, Booker T and Test defeated The Brothers of Destruction (The Undertaker and Kane) to win the WCW Tag Team Championship. On the October 4 edition of SmackDown!, Booker T defeated Kane after interference by Test. Booker T and Test assaulted Kane after the match until The Undertaker rescued him from the double-team assault. On the October 8 edition of Raw, The Undertaker cost Booker T and Test the WCW Tag Team Championship against the Hardy Boyz (Matt Hardy and Jeff Hardy). After the match, Booker T challenged The Undertaker to a match at No Mercy. During a match between Lita and Mighty Molly, it was announced that The Undertaker accepted Booker T's challenge to a match at No Mercy. On the October 11 edition of SmackDown!, Booker T and Test interfered in Kane's WWF European Championship match against The Hurricane and attacked him after the match, causing The Undertaker to come out and rescue Kane from the attack. After the match, Test challenged Kane to a match at No Mercy.

On the October 11 edition of SmackDown!, the Dudley Boyz (Bubba Ray Dudley and D-Von Dudley) defeated Big Show and Spike Dudley to retain the WWF Tag Team Championship. After the match, the Dudley Boyz attacked Big Show with the WWF Tag Team Championship belts and suplexed Spike on a table outside the ring. On the October 15 edition of Raw, the Dudley Boyz defeated Big Show in a Handicap match. After the match, Tajiri rescued Big Show by attacking the Dudley Boyz. On the October 18 edition of SmackDown!, Commissioner Mick Foley announced that the Dudley Boyz would defend the WWF Tag Team Championship against Big Show and Tajiri at No Mercy.

On the September 24 edition of Raw is War, Alliance member Stacy Keibler confronted her partner, Torrie Wilson in a backstage segment asking her if she was involved with Tajiri, a WWF wrestler. Torrie told Stacy that no one needed to interfere in her personal matters. Later that night, Stacy and Torrie managed Tazz and Tajiri for their match respectively. Tazz won when Tajiri was distracted by a fight between Stacy and Torrie outside the ring. On the October 1 edition of Raw is War, Tazz and Stacy defeated Tajiri and Torrie in a mixed tag team match. On the October 4 edition of SmackDown!, Torrie defeated Stacy in a bikini contest. After the contest ended, Stacy attacked Torrie. This led to a Lingerie match between the two at No Mercy.

== Event ==
Other on-screen personnel
Role:	Name:
English commentators	Jim Ross
English commentators	Paul Heyman
Spanish commentators	Carlos Cabrera
Spanish commentators	Hugo Savinovich
Backstage interviewers	Lilian Garcia
Backstage interviewers	Michael Cole
Backstage interviewers	Jonathan Coachman
Ring announcer	Howard Finkel
Referees	Charles Robinson
Referees	Mike Chioda
Referees	Nick Patrick
Referees	Jim Korderas
Referees	Earl Hebner
Referees	Tim White
Referees	Chad Patton
Referees	Jack Doan

Before the event aired live on pay-per-view, a pre-show of Sunday Night Heat was held. Acolytes Protection Agency (Faarooq and Bradshaw) defeated Chris Kanyon and Hugh Morrus in a tag team match. Bradshaw pinned Kanyon after delivering him a Clothesline from Hell. In the main event of Heat, Billy Kidman defended the WCW Cruiserweight Championship against Scotty 2 Hotty. Kidman pinned Scotty with a backslide and put his feet on the ropes for leverage to retain the Cruiserweight Championship.

=== Preliminary matches ===
As Sunday Night Heat concluded, the Hardy Boyz (Matt Hardy and Jeff Hardy) defended the WCW Tag Team Championship against Lance Storm and The Hurricane. The Hardy Boyz were accompanied by Matt Hardy's girlfriend Lita, while Storm and The Hurricane were accompanied by Ivory and The Hurricane's kayfabe sidekick Mighty Molly. The Hurricane and Storm double-teamed the Hardy Boyz for most of the match while the Hardy Boyz countered through their high-flying attacks. Near the end of the match, Lita battled Ivory and Mighty Molly. Jeff attacked Ivory but Storm attacked him from behind and applied a Canadian Maple Leaf. Lita performed a Lita-canrana on Storm, giving the advantage to the Hardy Boyz. Matt delivered a Twist of Fate to The Hurricane and Jeff finished The Hurricane with a Swanton Bomb, allowing Matt to pin The Hurricane to retain the WCW Tag Team Championship.

The match that followed was between Test and Kane. Kane dominated Test in the early goings through an elbow drop, Corner clotheslines and a Powerslam. The action spilled out to the outside of the ring, where Test nailed Kane in the head with a ring bell in front of the referee Nick Patrick. Test began dominating Kane. He performed a Sidewalk Slam and attempted to perform a Diving Elbow Drop but missed it. Kane delivered a Neckbreaker to Test and regained momentum. However, Test quickly made a comeback into the match and attempted to hit a Pumphandle Slam on Kane but Kane countered it with a Sidewalk Slam. Kane clotheslined Test out of the ring. Test pushed Kane into the ring post followed by a Big Boot. Test started bleeding from the mouth. He attempted another Big Boot but Kane ducked the move and performed a Chokeslam for a near-fall. Kane attempted to hit a Flying Clothesline on Test but Test avoided the move and performed a Pumphandle Slam for a near-fall. Test followed with a Diving Elbow Drop to get another near-fall. Test brought a chair in the ring but Kane drop-kicked the chair in Test's face and tried to use it but Nick Patrick took it away. Kane tried to hit Patrick with a Chokeslam but Test prevented Kane from performing the move and delivered him a Big Boot to win the match. After the match, an enraged Kane chokeslammed Patrick twice and finished him with a Powerbomb.

The third match was a Lingerie Match between Torrie Wilson and Stacy Keibler. Both Divas wrestled wearing lingerie. The match became a catfight as both Divas viciously battled against each other. Torrie performed a Handspring Elbow on Stacy to pin her for the victory.

The fourth match was a Ladder match for the WWF Intercontinental Championship as Christian defended the title against Edge. Edge and Christian started fighting on the entrance rampway. Most of the early action occurred in the ringside until their fight reached the crowd. They returned to the ringside and started using ladder as a foreign object. Both Christian and Edge set up a ladder each and both of them started climbing their ladders at the same time. Edge and Christian started battling each other again as Edge kicked a chair into Christian's face. Edge set a third ladder in the ring. Edge propped up the ladder across two chairs and laid Christian on it. Edge performed a Diving Splash across the ladder on Christian. Edge climbed a ladder but Christian knocked him off through a ladder. Edge recovered and delivered Christian, a Diving Spear. Both men started climbing the ladder at the same time. The ladder fell and both men fell to the outside floor. Christian returned to the ring first and started climbing the ladder again. Edge low blowed Christian with a chair and climbed the top of the ladder to hit Christian with a One-man Con-chair-to on top of the ladder, causing Christian to fall down on the ring floor. Edge took advantage and retrieved the Intercontinental Championship belt to win the match and the championship.

The fifth match featured the Dudley Boyz (Bubba Ray Dudley and D-Von Dudley) defending the WWF Tag Team Championship against Big Show and Tajiri. As the match started, Dudley Boyz dominated Tajiri until Tajiri got momentum by performing Kicks on Dudley Boyz. Bubba Ray eventually performed a Bubba Bomb on Tajiri. Dudley Boyz continued to dominate Tajiri. At one point, Big Show tagged in but the referee did not see it. Dudley Boyz continued to assault Tajiri until Show tagged in and started dominating the match. He attempted to perform a Chokeslam on Bubba Ray but D-Von low blowed Big Show. Tajiri applied a Tarantula, on D-Von but Bubba broke the hold. Tajiri delivered a Handspring Back Elbow to Dudley Boyz. He tried to blow Bubba Ray with a green Poison Mist but Bubba Ray avoided it and the referee was hit instead. Big Show chokeslammed D-Von and attempted a pinfall but there was no referee to count the pinfall. Rhyno took advantage of the situation and interfered in the match. He hit Big Show with a Gore and left. Tajiri hit D-Von with an Enzuigiri and finished him with a Buzzsaw Kick for a near-fall. Since Big Show was knocked out, Dudley Boyz double-teamed Tajiri and hit him with the 3D, allowing D-Von to pin Tajiri to retain the WWF Tag Team Championship.

=== Main event matches ===
The sixth match was between Booker T and The Undertaker. As The Undertaker got off his motorcycle, Booker T started attacking him. The match started when both men rolled into the ring and exchanged blows and kicks. The Undertaker started attacking Booker T's left arm and hit him with Old School. Booker T regained advantage in the match and sent him into the ring steps outside the ring. The action spilled to the outside where Booker continued to attack The Undertaker before returning to the ring. Booker T started dominating The Undertaker with a Missile Dropkick, a Spinning Heel Kick, a Sidewalk Slam and a Knee Drop before being hit with a Big Boot by The Undertaker. Booker T regained advantage and performed a Neckbreaker for a nearfall. Booker T climbed the top rope and jumped on The Undertaker but The Undertaker countered by performing a Big Boot for a nearfall. Booker T performed a Spinning Wheel Kick for a nearfall. The Undertaker proceeded by performing a Running DDT for a nearfall. The Undertaker followed with a Corner Clothesline and a Legdrop for a nearfall. Booker T whipped The Undertaker into the corner and hit him a Spinning Wheel Kick, sending him out of the ring. Booker T followed by performing a Scissors Kick on The Undertaker for a nearfall. The Undertaker tried to hit Booker T with a Chokeslam but Booker T low blowed The Undertaker and started attacking him in the corner with Mounted Punches. The Undertaker caught Booker T and performed a Last Ride to win the match.

The final match on the undercard featured The Rock defending the WCW Championship against Chris Jericho. As the match started, The Rock tried to perform a Rock Bottom on Jericho but Jericho countered it into the Walls of Jericho but The Rock caught the ropes. Jericho hit The Rock with a Springboard Dropkick through the ring apron. Jericho used several of his moves on The Rock and got several near-falls until The Rock made a comeback into the match by clotheslining Jericho. The Rock planted Jericho in the corner and delivered him a Superplex. The Rock performed a Snap Belly to Belly Suplex and a Samoan Drop for a near-fall. The Rock and Jericho continued to assault each other and the action even spilled to the outside on numerous occasions until Jericho started mocking The Rock by using his moves. Jericho hit The Rock with his own finisher Rock Bottom, followed by a Lionsault for a nearfall. Jericho hit The Rock with a One-handed Bulldog. Jericho attempted to hit The Rock's own finisher People's Elbow but The Rock avoided the move and applied a Sharpshooter on Jericho. Jericho reached the ropes and caught them. The Rock left the ring and removed the top of the Spanish announce table and removed the monitors. The Rock brought Jericho outside the ring and pulled him on the table and performed a Rock Bottom on the table. The action returned to the ring where The Rock hit Jericho with a Spinebuster and attempted to hit a People's Elbow, but Jericho countered it into the Walls of Jericho. Stephanie McMahon interfered in the match and came down to the ringside. She threw a chair in the ring. Jericho started chasing Stephanie. The Rock took advantage and hit Jericho with a Snap DDT. The Rock focused on Stephanie, pulled her into the ring and hit her with a Rock Bottom. Jericho took advantage and grabbed The Rock from behind and performed his new finisher, the Breakdown on The Rock on the chair to pin him for the WCW Championship. After the match, The Rock grabbed the chair in his hand but gave it to Jericho and left.

The main event was a Triple Threat for the WWF Championship. "Stone Cold" Steve Austin defended the title against Kurt Angle and Rob Van Dam. In the early goings of the match, Angle dominated Austin and Van Dam but he could not gain momentum for so long. Austin and Van Dam started double-teaming Angle and Austin attempted to hit a Stone Cold Stunner on Angle but Angle countered it into an Ankle Lock. Van Dam broke the hold until Austin and Van Dam began fighting with each other. Austin eventually began fighting with Angle and performed a Catapult on Angle into the steel steps outside the ring. Angle followed by throwing Austin into the crowd. Van Dam climbed the top rope and attempted to hit a Five-Star Frog Splash, but both men moved out of the way. Moments later, Austin hit a Stone Cold Stunner on Angle and attempted a pinfall but Van Dam broke up the pin. Van Dam set Austin up in the corner, and hit a Corkscrew Moonsault for a near-fall. Angle hit an Angle Slam on Van Dam and attempted a pinfall but Austin broke up the pin. Austin knocked Angle from the ring, and then went outside the ring after him. Austin and Angle duked it out on the outside, and Austin removed the top of the other announce table. He attempted to perform a Piledriver on Angle but Angle backdropped him onto the announce table, which did not break. Van Dam then scored with a leap to the outside on Angle, as all three men laid on the outside. Suddenly, Vince McMahon came down to ringside. Van Dam and Angle were the first two men up, and they slugged it out inside the ring, where Van Dam hit Angle with a Spinning Wheel Kick. Van Dam climbed up the top rope, but Angle caught him with a Super Belly-to-Belly Suplex. Austin finally got back into the ring, and hit another Stone Cold Stunner on Angle, but Angle fell outside the ring, so Austin turned his attention to Van Dam. McMahon got in the ring and nailed Austin in the back with a steel chair. Van Dam climbed up the top rope and performed a Five-Star Frog Splash on Austin, but Van Dam was injured, so he did not go for the pinfall. When he finally attempted the pinfall, Angle broke it up. Angle hit Van Dam with four consecutive Belly-to-Back Suplexes and an Angle Slam, but as he attempted the pinfall, Shane McMahon interfered in the match and threw Angle to the outside and into the ringpost. Shane and Vince then started going at it. Back in the ring, Austin hit a Stone Cold Stunner on Van Dam and pinned him to retain the WWF Championship.

== Aftermath ==
Team WWF and The Alliance continued their battle after No Mercy and The Alliance started sinking as a team. On the October 22 edition of Raw, The Alliance lost four championships to WWF wrestlers – Rhyno lost the WCW United States Championship to Kurt Angle, Billy Kidman lost the WCW Cruiserweight Championship to Tajiri, The Hurricane lost the WWF European Championship to Bradshaw and the Dudley Boyz (Bubba Ray Dudley and D-Von Dudley) lost the WWF Tag Team Championship to Chris Jericho and The Rock. On the October 25 episode of SmackDown, Kidman, Rhyno, Hurricane and the Dudley Boyz were attacked and fired by The Alliance for losing their respective titles. On the October 29 edition of Raw is War, Vince McMahon announced his team of WWF representatives to take on The Alliance at Survivor Series. The team consisted of Chris Jericho, The Rock, Kurt Angle and The Brothers of Destruction (The Undertaker and Kane). However, later that night, Team WWF's leading wrestler Kurt Angle turned on the WWF by helping WCW Owner Shane McMahon defeat his father Vince in a Street Fight. As a result, Angle joined The Alliance. On the November 1 edition of SmackDown, Vince announced that Shane's team of Alliance representatives consisted of "Stone Cold" Steve Austin, Kurt Angle, Booker T, Rob Van Dam and himself. Following this, Vince announced himself as Angle's replacement on Team WWF. Big Show would later replace Vince on Team WWF after Vince suffered a legitimate injury. On the November 5 edition of Raw, Jericho and Rock would have a rematch for the WCW Championship after losing the WWF Tag Team titles to Booker T and Test, with The Rock regaining the title via inside cradle. At Survivor Series, Team WWF defeated The Alliance in a Winner Takes All match when Angle turned on The Alliance and realigned himself with Team WWF. As a result, The Alliance was forced to disband.

The 2001 No Mercy was the final No Mercy held under the WWF name as the promotion was renamed to World Wrestling Entertainment (WWE) in May 2002. It was also the final No Mercy to be held before the introduction of the brand extension in March 2002, in which the promotion divided its roster between the Raw and SmackDown! brands where wrestlers were exclusively assigned to perform.

== Results ==
No.	Results	Stipulations	Times
1^{H}	The APA (Faarooq and Bradshaw) (WWF) defeated Chris Kanyon and Hugh Morrus (Alliance)	Tag team match	3:25
2^{H}	Billy Kidman (c) (Alliance) defeated Scotty 2 Hotty (WWF)	Singles match for the WCW Cruiserweight Championship	2:03
3	The Hardy Boyz (Matt and Jeff) (c) (with Lita) (WWF) defeated Lance Storm and The Hurricane (with Ivory and Mighty Molly) (Alliance)	Tag team match for the WCW Tag Team Championship	7:41
4	Test (Alliance) defeated Kane (WWF)	Singles match	10:05
5	Torrie Wilson (WWF) defeated Stacy Keibler (Alliance)	Lingerie match	3:06
6	Edge (WWF) defeated Christian (c) (Alliance)	Ladder match for the WWF Intercontinental Championship	22:16
7	The Dudley Boyz (Bubba Ray and D-Von) (c) (Alliance) defeated Big Show and Tajiri (WWF)	Tag team match for the WWF Tag Team Championship	9:19
8	The Undertaker (WWF) defeated Booker T (Alliance)	Singles match	12:13
9	Chris Jericho (WWF) defeated The Rock (c) (WWF)	Singles match for the WCW Championship	23:44
10	"Stone Cold" Steve Austin (c) (Alliance) defeated Kurt Angle (WWF) and Rob Van Dam (Alliance)	Triple threat match for the WWF Championship	15:14
(c) / – the champion(s) heading into the match; H / – the match was broadcast prior to the pay-per-view on Sunday Night Heat
