= Below the belt =

Forbidden contact zone in combat sports

Mainly used in combat sports such as boxing and kickboxing, below the belt refers to all the area of the body that lies below the line of the opponent's navel, including the genital area, legs, and crotch. In these sports, as in many others, punches must not be struck below the opponent's navel, as it is deemed unfair and contrary to sportsmanship.

The expression is also used figuratively to describe anything which is considered abusive, excessively hurtful, or plainly unfair.

== See also ==
- Groin attack
