= Groin attack =

Deliberate strike to the groin

A groin attack is a deliberate strike or other physical attack directed at a person's groin, particularly the genitalia. It causes immediate pain and, in more severe cases, genital injury. Groin attacks are prohibited as fouls in many combat sports, but are also taught in some self-defense systems. Groin injuries, particularly those involving men, are a recurring form of physical comedy in popular culture. Similar acts may occur consensually in some BDSM practices.

== In sports ==
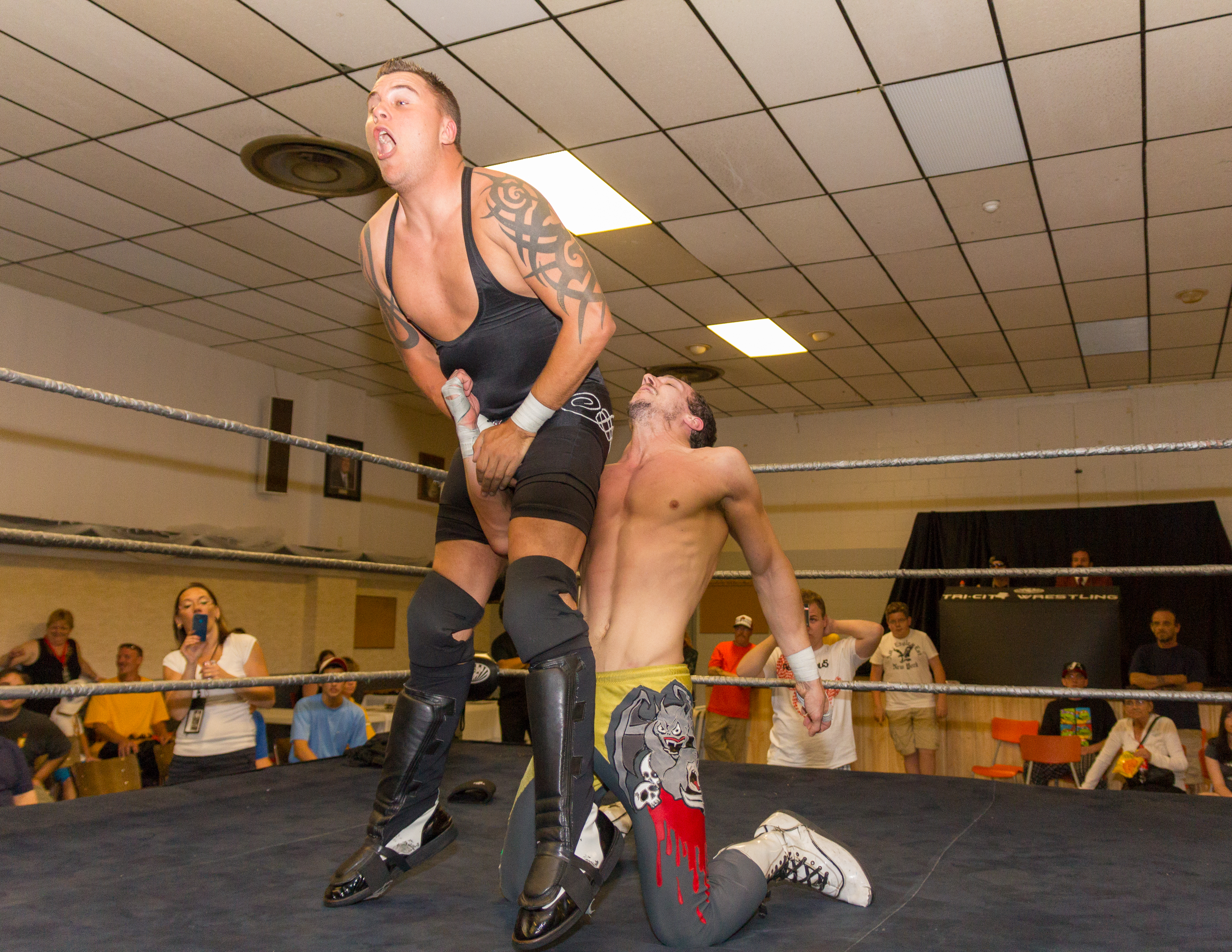
A low blow in professional wrestling

In boxing, a strike below the belt is known as a low blow. Strikes below the belt have long been treated as fouls in boxing, and the expression for an unfair or improper action. Under the Association of Boxing Commissions' Unified Rules, a boxer affected by an accidental low blow may be given up to five minutes to recover.

Groin attacks are also fouls under the Unified Rules of Mixed Martial Arts. The rules prohibit striking, grabbing, pinching or twisting the groin and apply to both male and female competitors. A competitor affected by a groin foul may be given up to five minutes to recover. Depending on whether the foul was accidental or intentional and whether the injured competitor can continue, it may also result in a point deduction, disqualification or a technical decision.

Intentional strikes to the groin are also fouls under international Muay Thai rules, where the groin is excluded from legal scoring targets.

== In self-defense ==
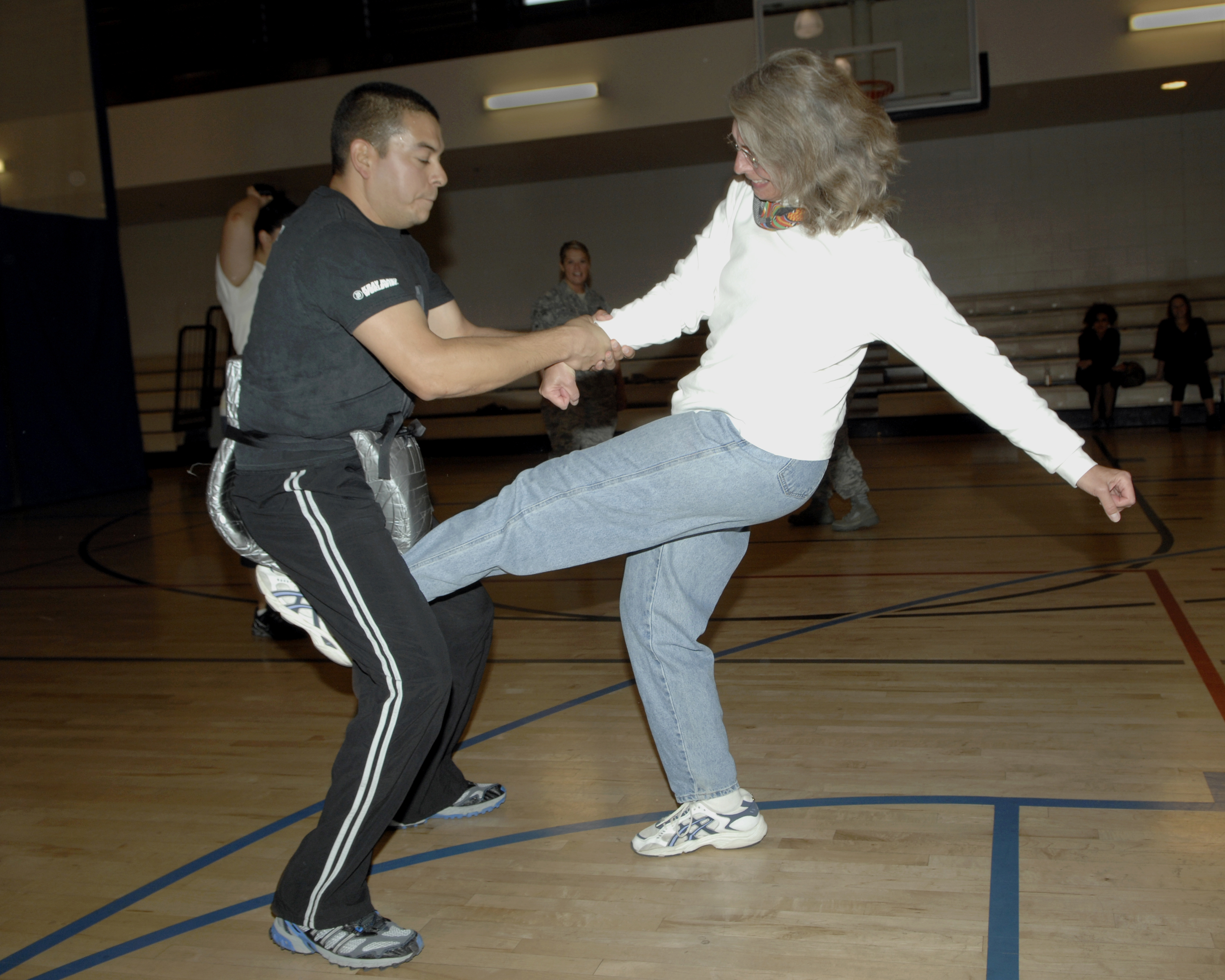
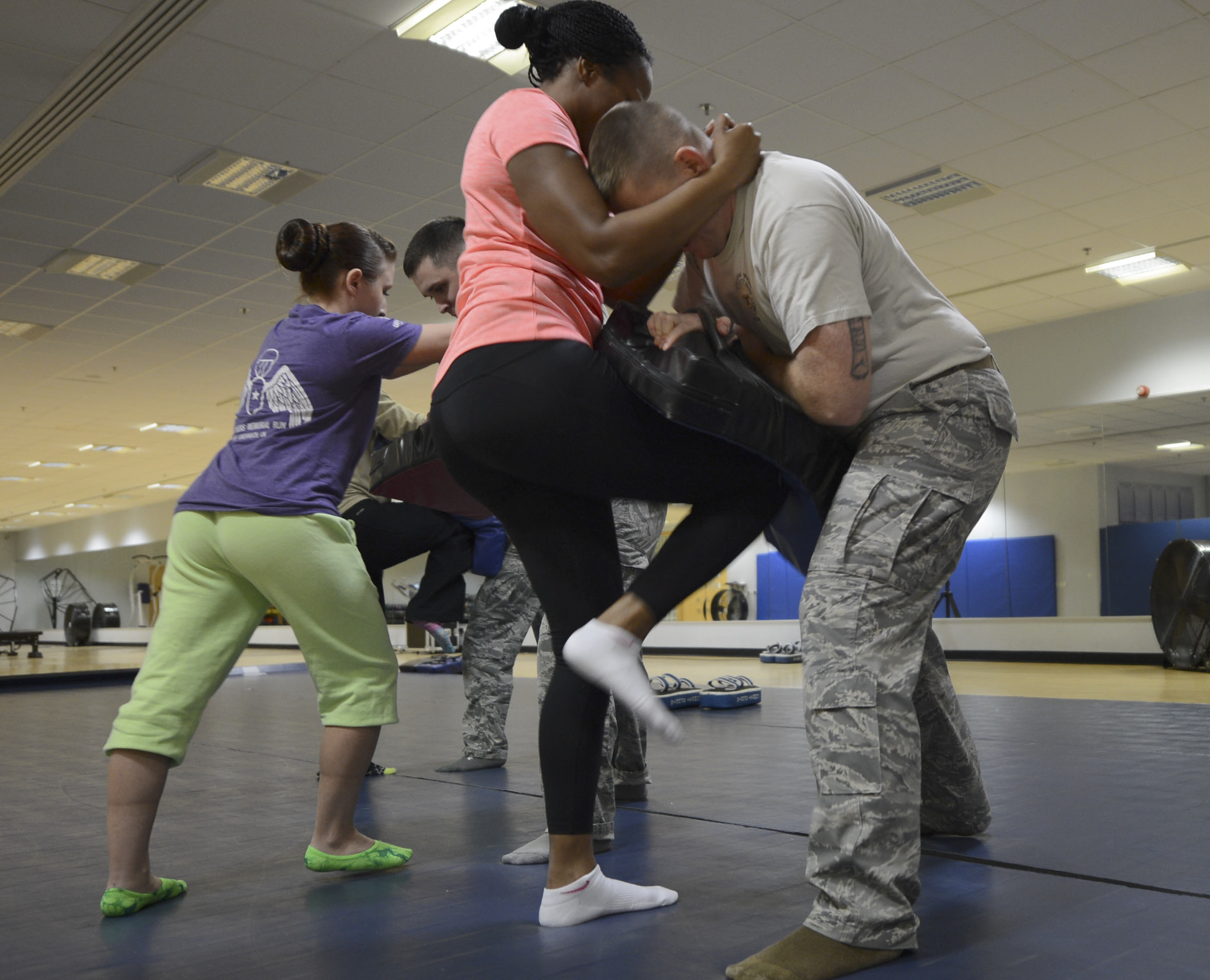
Groin attacks are a common technique taught in self-defense classes.

Groin strikes are taught in some self-defense systems as attacks against a vulnerable area. They can include kicks or knee strikes, as well as grabbing or other forms of pressure to the groin.

Groin strikes are also included in some women's self-defense and sexual-assault-resistance programs. Some programs use padded instructors or protective equipment so that participants can practice more realistically. These programs generally teach physical resistance as part of a broader set of strategies alongside verbal resistance, boundary-setting and escape strategies.

When directed at a male assailant, a groin strike may cause severe testicular pain and is intended to briefly interrupt the assault, creating an opportunity to escape.

== In BDSM ==
Consensual pain or impact to the groin can form part of erotic play. This may include cock and ball torture (CBT), which can involve painful stimulation of the penis or testicles. Impact-focused forms are called ballbusting, during which the testicles are deliberately struck or otherwise subjected to pain. Similar practices involving pain to the female genitalia have also been reported in studies of BDSM communities. Although such activities are consensual, impacts or pressure to the genitals can still cause injury.

== In popular culture ==
Groin attacks against men are a recurring form of physical comedy in film and television and have also been used in advertising. The humor often relies on surprise, humiliation and exaggerated reactions.

Accidental groin injuries are also a recurring feature of humorous home and online videos. America's Funniest Home Videos became particularly associated with such clips. Such incidents, which may involve accidental falls or impacts with objects, are sometimes informally described as "nutshots".

Groin injuries are also a recurring feature of the Jackass franchise, whose participants perform painful and humiliating stunts for entertainment.

== Effects ==
A blow to the groin usually causes immediate pain and tenderness.

In males, the testes are especially vulnerable because they lie outside. Testicular pain is also felt in the lower abdomen because testicles share nerve pathways with surrounding areas. More serious injuries can result in lasting pain or shrinkage of the affected testis. Severe injuries can cause testicular torsion or testicular rupture, which occurs when a testis is compressed against the pelvis. Testicular injuries may also affect fertility or testosterone production.

In females, a blow to the groin can injure the vulva, including the labia and clitoris, causing pain, bruising, swelling or bleeding. The clitoris is densely supplied with sensory nerves, and the clitoris and labia are among the external genital structures most exposed. A strong impact can also cause a vulvar hematoma, in which blood collects within the vulvar tissues.

== See also ==
- Below the belt
- Cock and ball torture
- Krav Maga § Techniques
- Professional wrestling attacks § Testicular claw
