= Balls.ie =

Irish sport news website

- Website type: Sport website
- Available in: English
- Owner: Balls Media
- Website: balls.ie

Balls.ie is a sport website based in Ireland. It was founded in 2010.

According to The Irish Times in 2015, 1.2 million unique visitors experienced Balls.ie every month. This had risen to 1.7 million by 2016. According to Balls Media's Brian Reynolds, it refused two full takeover attempts in 2015.

Enterprise Ireland and the National Digital Research Centre provided it with funds of €75,000 in 2014, with a return of around 15 per cent equity at a value of around €500,000. Key Capital, majority owner of The Sunday Business Post, became involved in 2015, investing approximately €100,000. At this time, the business had ten staff. Enterprise Ireland offered a further €150,000 in 2016.

Basketball Ireland have had Balls.ie as a "digital content partner", with this being the website's first such partnership.
