= Unforgiven (2005) =

World Wrestling Entertainment pay-per-view event

- Promotional poster featuring John Cena and Kurt Angle
- Promotion: World Wrestling Entertainment
- Brand: Raw
- Date: September 18, 2005
- City: Oklahoma City, Oklahoma
- Venue: Ford Center
- Attendance: 8,000
- Buy rate: 243,000

Pay-per-view chronology
← Previous; SummerSlam	Next → No Mercy

Unforgiven chronology
← Previous; 2004	Next → 2006

The 2005 Unforgiven was a professional wrestling pay-per-view (PPV) event produced by World Wrestling Entertainment (WWE). It was the eighth annual Unforgiven and took place on September 18, 2005, at the Ford Center in Oklahoma City, Oklahoma, held exclusively for wrestlers from the promotion's Raw brand division.

The main event was a standard wrestling match, in which Kurt Angle defeated WWE Champion John Cena, after Cena used the Championship belt on Angle, leading to a disqualification, but since a championship cannot change hands via countout or disqualification unless stipulated, Cena retained the title. Two featured bouts on the undercard were another standard match, in which Shawn Michaels defeated Chris Masters, and a Steel Cage match, where the ring is enclosed by a steel cage, in which Matt Hardy defeated Edge.

Unforgiven grossed over $485,000 in ticket sales from an attendance of approximately 8,000, and received about 243,000 pay-per-view buys. This amount was higher than the previous year's event. When the event was released on DVD, it reached a peak position of third on Billboard's DVD Sales Chart.

== Production ==
=== Background ===
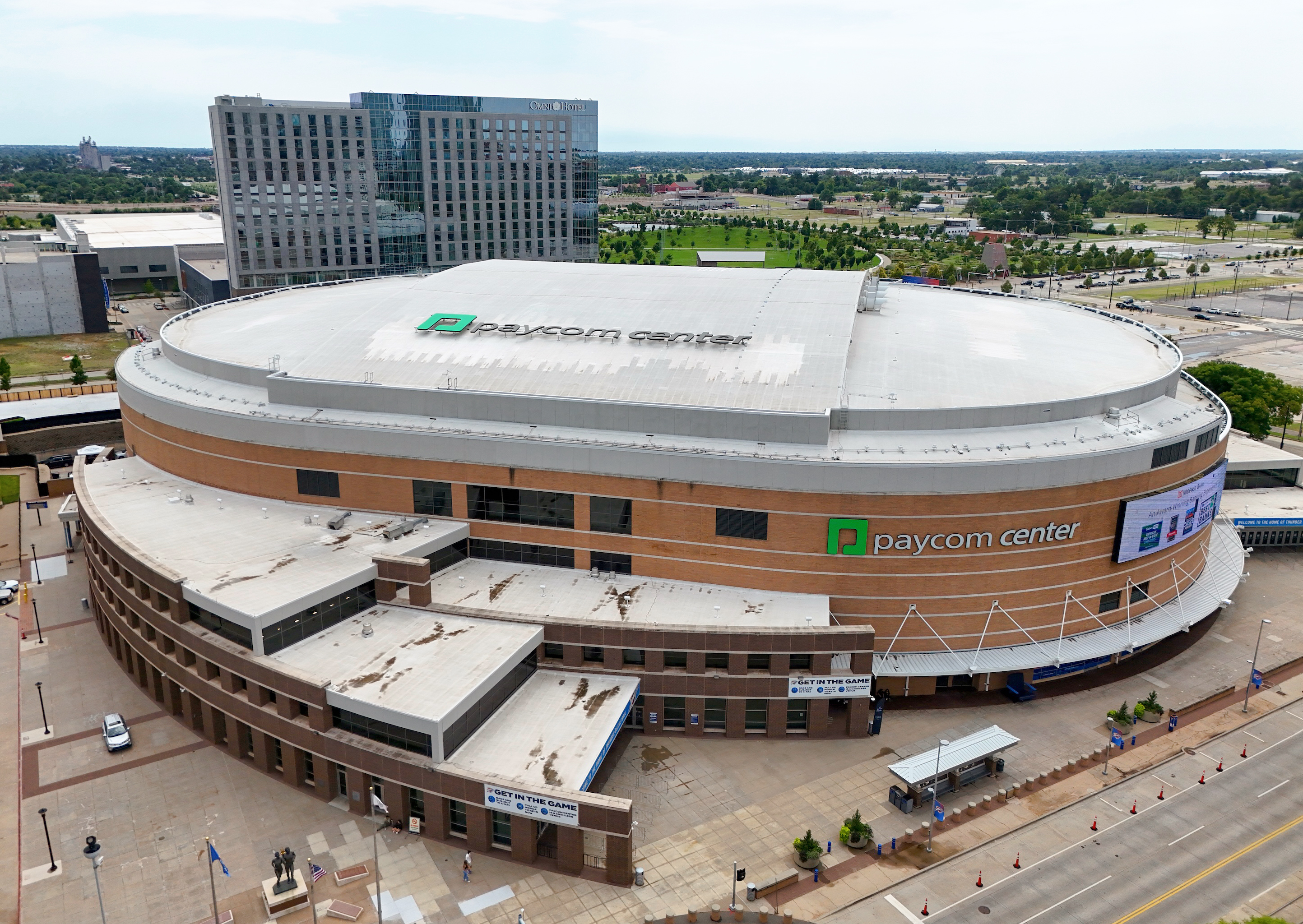
The eighth Unforgiven was held at the Ford Center in Oklahoma City, Oklahoma.

Unforgiven was an annual professional wrestling pay-per-view (PPV) event first held by World Wrestling Entertainment (WWE) as the 21st In Your House PPV event in April 1998. Following the discontinuation of the In Your House series in February 1999, Unforgiven continued as its own PPV event in September that year, becoming WWE's annual September PPV. The eighth event took place on September 18, 2005, at the Ford Center in Oklahoma City, Oklahoma. Like the previous two years's events, it featured wrestlers exclusively from the Raw brand.

=== Storylines ===
Eight professional wrestling matches were scheduled on the event's card beforehand, which were planned with predetermined outcomes by WWE's script writers. The buildup to these matches and scenarios that took place before, during and after the event were also planned by the script writers. The event featured wrestlers and other talent from Raw's brand – a storyline expansion in which WWE assigned its employees.

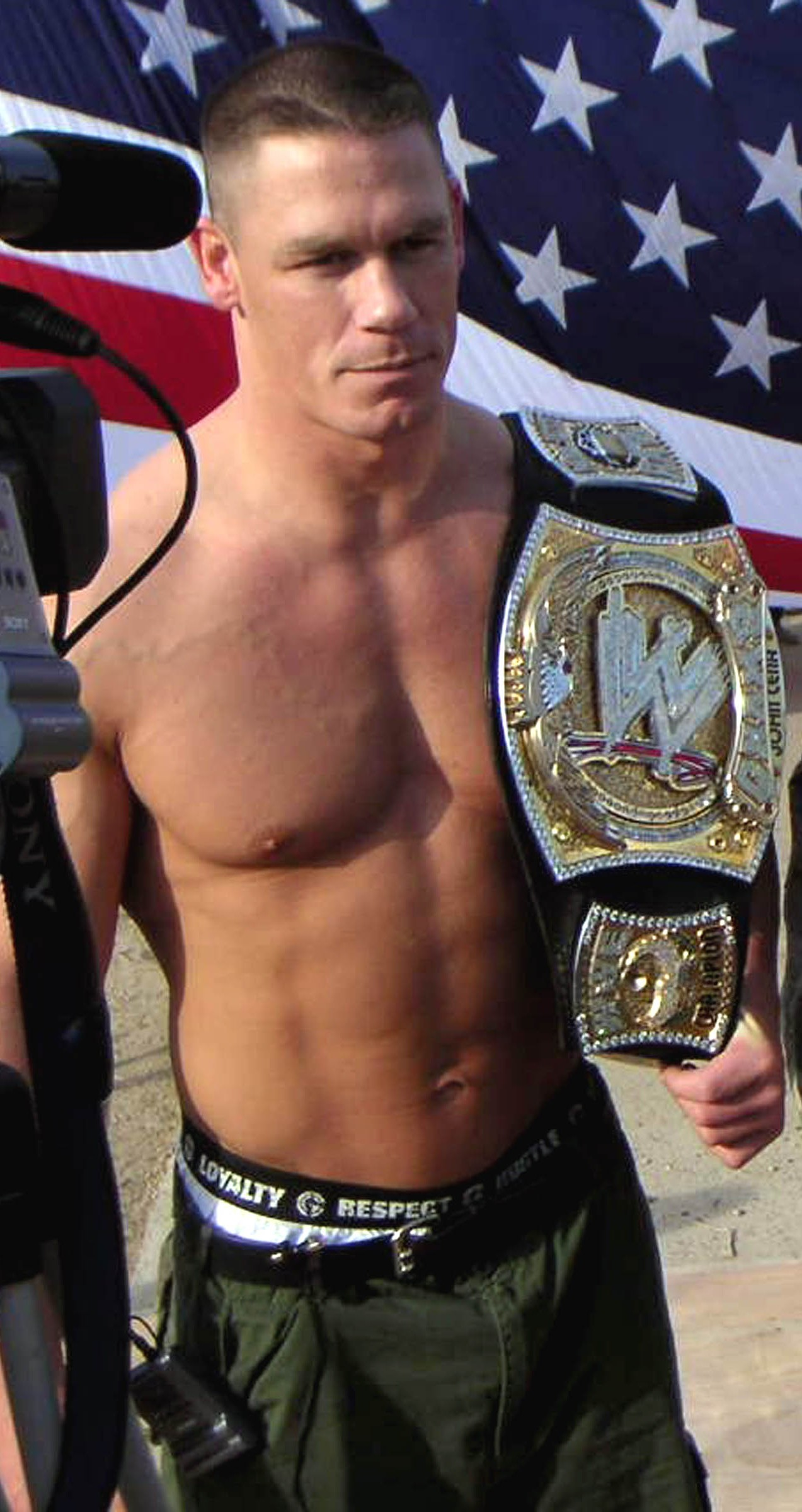
John Cena as WWE Champion

The main rivalry written into Unforgiven was between John Cena and Kurt Angle, who were competing for Cena's WWE Championship. At SummerSlam, Cena defeated Chris Jericho to retain the WWE Championship. A rematch was held on the August 22 episode of Raw, when Raw general manager Eric Bischoff announced a WWE Championship rematch between Cena and Jericho in a "You're Fired" match, in which the loser would be fired. The match saw Cena win, and Bischoff fired a pleading Jericho, who was carried out of the arena by security. This angle was written after WWE's official website confirmed that Jericho signed a short-term contract extension to stay with the company after his long-term contract expired, which presumably ended after his loss to Cena. After the match, Angle came down to the ring and attacked Cena with an Angle Slam. As Cena was down, Bischoff announced that Angle was the new contender for the WWE Championship, claiming that Jericho "couldn't get the job done". Angle continued his attacks on Cena before their scheduled match at Unforgiven. On the August 29 episode of Raw, Cena was scheduled in a handicap match. He faced Tyson Tomko and Angle. Cena won the match by pinning Tomko after an FU. Afterwards, Angle assaulted Cena, which led to Angle smashing Cena's ankle across the ring post, thus giving Angle the advantage heading into Unforgiven.

Another major rivalry heading into the event was between Shawn Michaels and Chris Masters. This feud began the night after SummerSlam, where Michaels lost a match to Hulk Hogan. Michaels admitted he fell victim to Hogan's leg drop. He concluded that Hogan was the better man and it was time to get "back to reality". Midway through Michaels' speech, Masters interrupted him and informed Michaels that individuals like Hogan and Michaels did not know how to pass the torch to new wrestlers. Michaels went along with Masters' comments and warned Masters to not group him with Hogan. Masters concluded by stating that he was not "trying" to steal the spotlight from Michaels, but that he was going to "take it". Michaels responded by saying that he knew where Masters was coming from, which led to Michaels slapping Masters. The two then brawled, thus turning Michaels into an on-screen hero, as he had been a villain in the rivalry with Hogan. On the September 5 episode of Raw, Michaels was involved in the Masterlock Challenge, a challenge where the wrestler must break free from Master's full Nelson submission hold, which he calls the Master Lock. Despite Michaels' best efforts, he could not break free. Upset at the vigorous resistance of Michaels, Masters released the hold and hit Michaels with a steel chair before re-applying the hold. The following week, Michaels issued a challenge to Masters at Unforgiven, in which he vowed to get revenge on Masters for his actions the previous week.

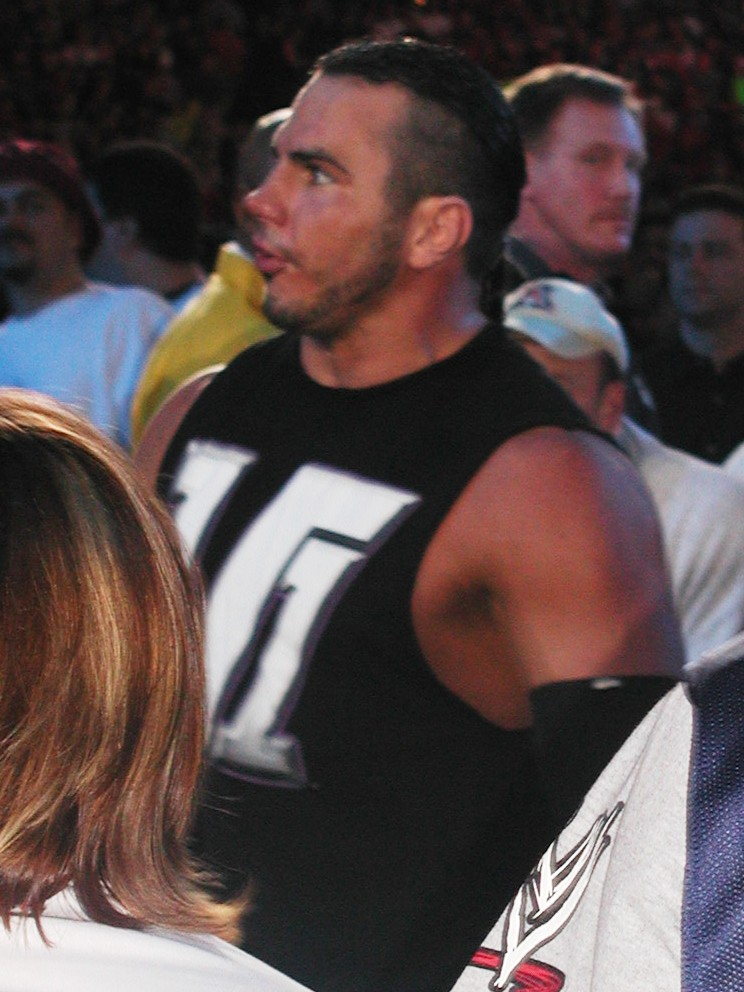
Matt Hardy, who faced off against Edge in a steel cage match

The other predominant rivalry heading into the event was between Matt Hardy and Edge, a real life issue transformed into a storyline. At SummerSlam, Edge defeated Hardy after dropping him onto the top of a ring post. This caused Hardy to bleed heavily, which forced the referee to end the match and declare Edge the winner because Hardy could not continue. The next night on Raw, Hardy had a match with Rob Conway, in which Conway pinned Hardy for the win. After the match, Edge attacked Hardy. On the August 29 episode of Raw, Edge and Hardy competed in a Street Fight. The match ended in a no-contest after Hardy and Edge brawled at the stage ramp. Hardy grabbed Edge by the side and threw both himself and Edge off the stage and into electrical equipment. Both Hardy and Edge laid motionless on the floor as sparks flew everywhere. Trainers and emergency medical technicians rushed to the scene and took both men away in ambulances for medical attention. The following week, Bischoff booked Hardy and Edge in a steel cage match at Unforgiven. Following the announcement, Bischoff scheduled a match between Hardy and Snitsky, which Hardy lost. After the match, Snitsky threatened to hit Hardy with a ring bell but The Big Show came down. He was unable to stop Snitsky, and as a result, Snitsky succeeded in hitting Hardy with the bell.

The Divas rivalry heading into the event was between Ashley Massaro and the stable known as Vince's Devils. A week after winning the Diva Search, Massaro was attacked by Torrie Wilson and Candice Michelle, who were traded to Raw, after they pretended to congratulate her, turning both Torrie and Candice into heels. After their villainous turns, Torrie and Candice aligned with Victoria to form Vince's Devils, and the trio spent weeks tormenting her, which included Massaro suffering a pair of losses to Victoria and Torrie. On the September 12 edition of Raw, Trish Stratus returned from injury and helped Massaro fight off the Devils, leading to the announcement that Torrie and Victoria would face Massaro and Stratus at Unforgiven.

== Event ==
Other on-screen personnel
Role:	Name:
English commentators	Jim Ross
English commentators	Jerry Lawler
English commentators	Jonathan Coachman
Spanish commentators	Carlos Cabrera
Spanish commentators	Hugo Savinovich
Interviewers	Todd Grisham
Interviewers	Maria
Ring announcer	Lilian Garcia
Referees	Mike Chioda
Referees	Chad Patton
Referees	Jack Doan
Referees	Chris Kay

Before the event went live on pay-per-view, Rob Conway defeated Tajiri in a match taped for Heat, one of WWE's secondary television programs.

=== Preliminary matches ===
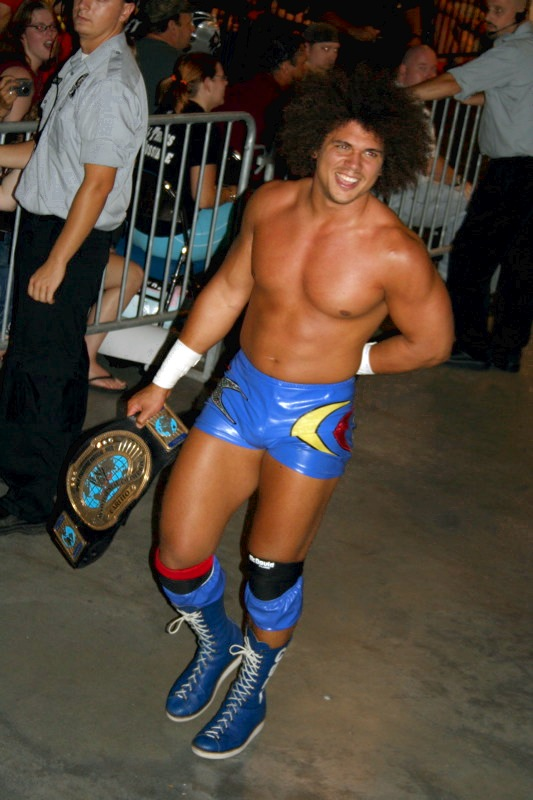
Carlito as Intercontinental Champion

The first televised match was for the WWE Intercontinental Championship, which involved the champion Carlito and challenger Ric Flair. The match began with Flair taking down Carlito with a series of headlock takeovers. Carlito was able to deliver a clothesline, but Flair brought Carlito down with an Inverted atomic drop. Flair later went for the figure four leglock, but Carlito reversed it. After back and forth action between the two, Flair took the advantage and applied the figure four leglock on Carlito. By making him tap out, Flair became the new Intercontinental Champion, the oldest in WWE history at 56.

The next match was a tag team match featuring the team of Trish Stratus and Ashley against the team of Victoria and Torrie Wilson (with Candice Michelle as Victoria and Wilson's manager). The match started off with Wilson and Stratus in the ring. Wilson tagged in Victoria, who applied a full-body choke on Stratus, but Stratus started to work on Victoria's arm. Victoria countered Stratus' arm takedown. Stratus then performed a Headscissors Takedown. Back and forth action continued; the match, however, came to an end when Stratus was able to perform a roundhouse kick on Victoria, giving the victory to Stratus and Ashley.

The third match saw Big Show face Snitsky. The match began with Big Show and Snitsky brawling as the bell rang. Big Show was able to perform a big slap to the chest and headbutt. Snitsky then took the upper hand over Big Show, as he applied an armbar hold, after countering a chokeslam. Big Show delivered a spinebuster and got the victory after a successful chokeslam.

The next match was another standard match involving Shelton Benjamin and Kerwin White. White tried to get in the ring, but Benjamin slid out and tripped him. Benjamin threw White into the ring barricade, which led him to throw him back in the ring as the bell rang to officially start the match. In the ring, Benjamin body slammed White, which was followed by a running forearm. White retaliated with a dropkick to Benjamin's knee. The match concluded after White grabbed a golf club that he hid in the steel steps and tried to assault Benjamin with it. Benjamin, however, countered with a T-Bone Suplex and covered White and got the pinfall victory.

In the fifth match Matt Hardy faced Edge, who was accompanied by Lita, inside a Steel Cage. As the bell rang, Hardy tried to throw Edge face-first into the cage wall but didn't succeed. Back and forth action took place until Hardy got the advantage over Edge. Hardy threw Edge into the cage wall, causing Edge to bleed. Lita began to climb up the outside the cage, but Hardy hit the cage, making Lita fall off. As Lita distracted Hardy, Edge started to crawl out. Hardy noticed this, grabbed Edge, and threw him into a corner. Lita interfered, which led to Hardy delivering a Twist of Fate to Lita. Edge executed a Spear on Hardy for a near-fall. After knocking Edge off the turnbuckle, Hardy delivered a leg drop off the top of the cage before pinning Edge for the win.

=== Main event matches ===
The next match was Rosey and The Hurricane defending the World Tag Team Championship against Lance Cade and Trevor Murdoch. During the match, Murdoch delivered a DDT to The Hurricane on the outside the ring. WWE medical trainers came to ringside to check on The Hurricane. The match concluded when Cade pinned The Hurricane, who was legitimately injured, to win the World Tag Team Championship.

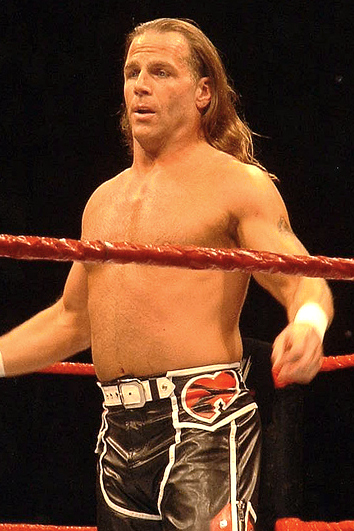
Shawn Michaels faced Chris Masters

The seventh match was a standard match between Shawn Michaels and Chris Masters. The match started with Masters applying the Masterlock on Michaels. After breaking the hold, Michaels delivered a clothesline and knife edged chops. Masters, however, dominated Michaels, focusing on his back by powerbombing Michaels several times. He also lifted Michaels vertically in the air and stalled him there before slamming him down. Michaels fought back, as he delivered a Diving Elbow Drop. Masters was able to lock in the Masterlock once more. Michaels tried to use the corners to break the hold, but Masters kept it locked on. Michaels then leaped over the top rope and landed on the ring apron, causing the referee to order Masters to break the hold. Michaels countered with a Sweet Chin Music, thus Michaels got the pinfall victory over Masters.

In the main event, John Cena defended the WWE Championship against Kurt Angle. The match began with Angle and Cena locking up, leading to Angle taking Cena down with a headlock takeover. Cena countered many attacks by Angle and was able to reverse the ankle lock. Cena attempted an FU but Angle delivered an Angle Slam. Eric Bischoff came down the ramp and cheered for Angle, who had the Ankle Lock applied on Cena. Cena rolled out of the move, grabbed the championship belt, which Bischoff had brought with him, and hit Angle with it. The referee saw this and called for the bell. As a result, Cena was disqualified for hitting Angle with the championship, ultimately resulting in him retaining his title. After the match, Bischoff tried to strip Cena of the title but was given an FU for his trouble then Angle attacked Cena until Cena delivered an FU through the Spanish announce table on Angle.

== Reception ==
The Ford Center has a maximum capacity of 19,599. The event grossed over $485,000 in ticket sales from an attendance of 8,000. The promotion's pay-per-view revenue was $185 million. Canadian Online Explorer's professional wrestling section rated the entire event a 6 out of 10 stars. The rating was lower than the Unforgiven event in 2006, which rated 7 out of 10 stars. The steel cage match was rated a 7 out of 10 stars, as well as the Shawn Michaels and Chris Masters' match. The divas tag team match and the singles match between Big Show and Snitsky, were rated 3 out of 10 stars each.

The event was released on DVD by Sony Music Entertainment on October 25, 2005. The DVD reached third on Billboard's DVD Sales Chart for recreational sports during the week of November 19, 2005, although falling thereafter. It remained in the chart for two consecutive weeks, until the week of December 3, 2005, when it ranked seventh.

== Aftermath ==
The feud between John Cena and Kurt Angle, with the involvement of Eric Bischoff, continued. During Raw episodes, it saw Angle and Bischoff interfere in Cena's matches, and even deciding the outcome of Cena's matches. On the October 17 episode of Raw, Bischoff announced that a triple threat match for the WWE Championship would take place between Cena, Angle and the fans' choice at Taboo Tuesday. Bischoff announced three series of qualifying matches, in which the winner would receive a spot on the ballot as a potential challenger to join Cena and Angle. The winners were Big Show, Shawn Michaels and Kane. The following week, a Triple Threat match was scheduled between Big Show, Michaels and Kane. Michaels won the match after he hit both Big Show and Kane with a superkick and pinned Big Show for the win. The following week, Bischoff announced a match between Cena and Michaels. Late in the match, Angle attacked both Cena and Michaels. Cena, however, retaliated and got Angle up for an FU, but Michaels managed to hit Cena with a superkick. At Taboo Tuesday, Michaels won the fans' choice to join Cena and Angle in the championship match. Cena, however, defeated Michaels and Angle to retain the WWE Championship, after pinning Michaels.

Triple H returned on the October 3 episode of Raw, WWE Raw Homecoming, after a three-month hiatus. He took part in a match, teaming up with Ric Flair, who was a fan favorite during Triple H's absence, to take on Chris Masters and Carlito. Triple H and Flair defeated Masters and Carlito; after the match, Triple H turned on Flair and hit him with a sledgehammer and marked officially the end of Evolution after more than two long years since 2003. This led to a rivalry between Triple H and Flair. At Taboo Tuesday, Triple H and Flair met in a steel cage match, a stipulation chosen by the fans, for the WWE Intercontinental Championship. The match saw Flair retain the Intercontinental Championship, after escaping through the cage door.

The rivalry between Matt Hardy and Edge continued and culminated in a "Loser Leaves Raw Ladder match", where the objective was to reach a briefcase suspended in the air using a ladder, at WWE Homecoming, which Edge won. As a result, Hardy was moved to the SmackDown! brand.

== Results ==
No.	Results	Stipulations	Times
1^{H}	Rob Conway defeated Tajiri by pinfall	Singles match	3:44
2	Ric Flair defeated Carlito (c) by submission	Singles match for the WWE Intercontinental Championship	11:46
3	Ashley and Trish Stratus defeated The Ladies in Pink (Torrie Wilson and Victoria) (with Candice Michelle) by pinfall	Tag team match	7:05
4	Big Show defeated Snitsky by pinfall	Singles match	6:08
5	Shelton Benjamin defeated Kerwin White by pinfall	Singles match	8:03
6	Matt Hardy defeated Edge (with Lita) by pinfall	Steel Cage match	21:33
7	Lance Cade and Trevor Murdoch defeated The Hurricane and Rosey (c) by pinfall	Tag team match for the World Tag Team Championship	7:40
8	Shawn Michaels defeated Chris Masters by pinfall	Singles match	16:44
9	Kurt Angle defeated John Cena (c) by disqualification	Singles match for the WWE Championship	17:15
(c) / – the champion(s) heading into the match; H / – the match was broadcast prior to the pay-per-view on Sunday Night Heat
