= Ashley Massaro =

American professional wrestler (1979–2019)

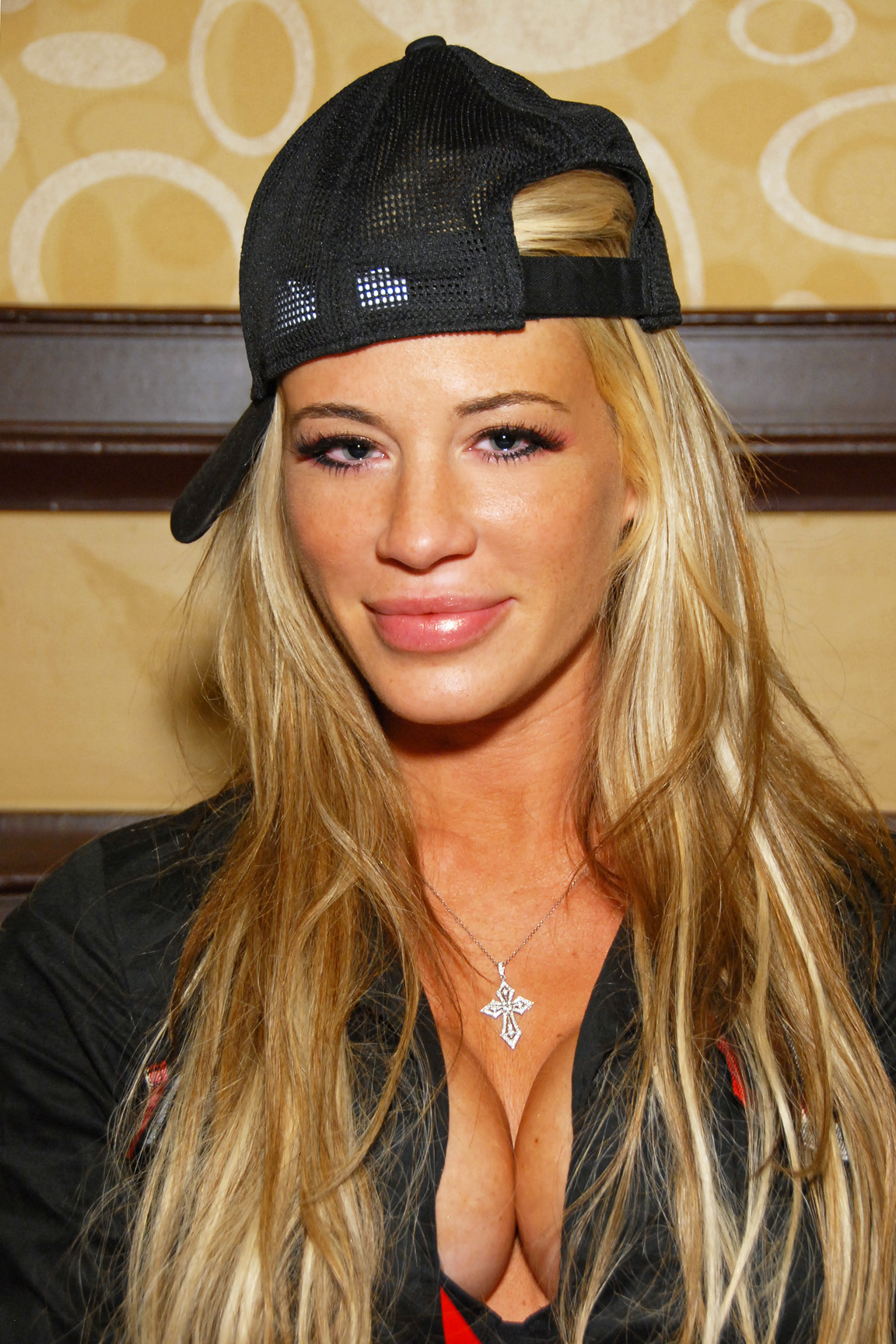
- Massaro in 2011
- Born: May 26, 1979; New York City, U.S.
- Died: May 16, 2019 (aged 39); Smithtown, New York, U.S.
- Resting place: Saint James Episcopal Church Cemetery (33.9557322, -84.5506170)
- Education: University at Albany, SUNY
- Occupations: Professional wrestler; reality television contestant; actress; model
- Years active: 2002–2019
- Children: 1
- Professional wrestling career
- Ring name(s): Ashley; Ashley Massaro
- Billed height: 5 ft 4 in (1.63 m)
- Billed weight: 110 lb (50 kg)
- Billed from: New York City
- Trained by: Dave Finlay; Ricky Steamboat; Trish Stratus
- Debut: 2005
- Retired: 2008

Ashley Marie Massaro (May 26, 1979 – May 16, 2019) was an American professional wrestler. She was best known for her time with World Wrestling Entertainment (WWE) where she performed under her real name.

Massaro made her debut in WWE after winning the WWE Raw Diva Search in 2005. She was first assigned to the Raw brand, where she had her first wrestling feud against Vince's Devils (a villainous female stable) while aligning herself with Trish Stratus to defeat the team. With Stratus, she was involved in another feud with the then-debuting Mickie James, who was obsessed with Stratus and jealous of Massaro's friendship with her, attacking and causing her to lose matches. Massaro was later drafted to SmackDown and became the valet for the WWE Tag Team Champions, Paul London and Brian Kendrick. Her most high-profile matches were a WWE Women's Championship match against Melina at WrestleMania 23 and a Playboy Bunnymania Lumberjill match at WrestleMania XXIV.

Massaro left WWE in July 2008. During her tenure in the company, she had appeared on the covers of several magazines, including the April 2007 issue of Playboy, and also made appearances on television and in music videos. She also competed on Survivor: China, where she became the second person voted out. In addition, she spent the last two years of her life working as a radio DJ for 94.3 The Shark.

== Early life ==
Ashley Marie Massaro was born in New York City on May 26, 1979. She was raised in Babylon, New York, where her brother, father, and uncle competed in amateur wrestling. She graduated in 1997 from John Glenn High School in Elwood, New York, and received a BSc in communication with a minor in business from the State University of New York at Albany.

== Professional wrestling career ==
=== World Wrestling Entertainment/WWE (2005–2008) ===
==== Diva Search (2005) ====
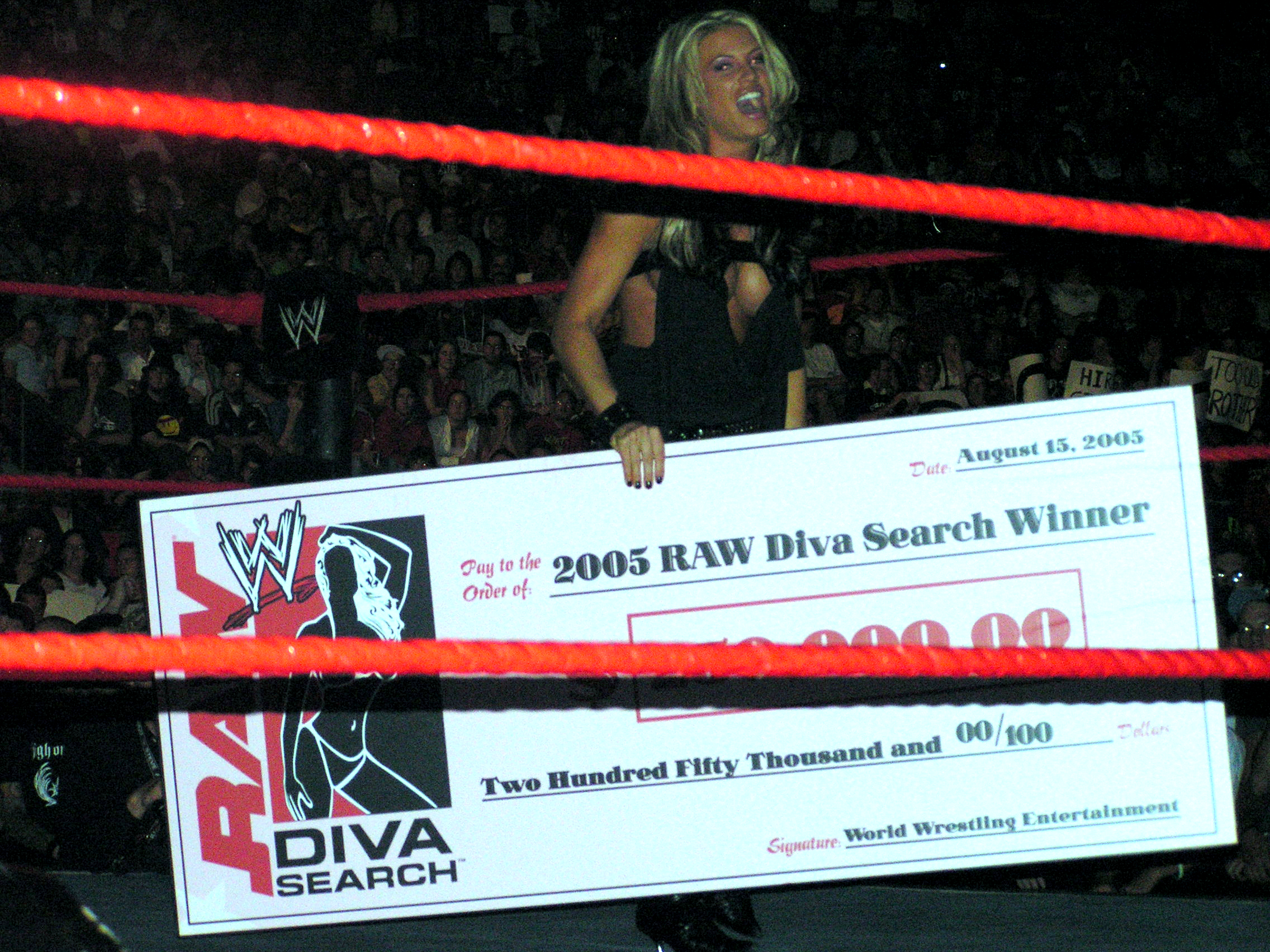
Massaro winning the 2005 WWE Diva Search contest

Massaro initially found out about World Wrestling Entertainment's (WWE) 2005 Raw Diva Search when she met a WWE casting director during a swimsuit pageant. After beating the seven other chosen finalists, Massaro was declared the winner on the episode of Raw which aired on Monday, August 15, 2005. Her winnings included $250,000 and a one-year contract with WWE.

==== Feud with Vince's Devils and Mickie James (2005–2006) ====
A week later on the August 22, 2005, episode of Raw, Candice Michelle and Torrie Wilson attacked Massaro after pretending to welcome her to the brand. Massaro's storyline feud with Wilson and Michelle continued over the next couple weeks, as the duo, along with their enforcer Victoria (dubbed as the "Skankateers" by commentator Jim Ross), made things difficult for Massaro. Massaro made her in-ring debut on the August 29 episode of Raw, in a losing effort to Victoria. On the September 5 episode of Raw, Massaro was defeated by Wilson due to interference from Victoria and Candice. Massaro evened the score on the September 12 episode of Raw when she brought out the returning Trish Stratus (who then turned face), and the duo proceeded to attack them. On the September 18 episode of Raw, The pair defeated the trio—who became known as the Ladies in Pink (and later Vince's Devils). This led to a tag team match at Unforgiven, where the team of Stratus and Massaro defeated Wilson and Victoria. The following night on Raw, Massaro accompanied Trish where she defeated Wilson. After the match, The duo were attacked by The Vince Devils. The feud continued into WWE Homecoming, where Stratus and Massaro defeated Wilson, Candice, and Victoria in the first ever three on two Bra and Panties match by stripping all three of their opponents. Massaro continued to wrestle matches through the rest of 2005 and was involved in the annual Fulfill Your Fantasy Diva Battle Royal at Taboo Tuesday for her first shot at the WWE Women's Championship. Massaro eliminated Candice Michelle before being eliminated by Victoria.

On January 8, 2006, at New Year's Revolution, Massaro won the first ever Bra and Panties Gauntlet match by being the final wrestler left still wearing her clothes. Following WWE tradition, to please the fans, she removed them herself before making her exit. Through the early part of this year, Massaro became the victim of a series of attacks from Mickie James. At Royal Rumble on January 29, James defeated Massaro with then Women's Champion, Trish Stratus, as the special guest referee. Massaro got her revenge one week later by pinning James in the rematch on Raw. On the February 20 episode of Raw, however, Massaro suffered a fractured left fibula while being eliminated from the Women's Battle Royal, and her feud with James was cut short. She underwent surgery to insert a five-inch metal plate and eight screws into her leg. During her recovery, Massaro still occasionally appeared on Raw as part of the Stratus/James feud, albeit in a non-active role. Massaro returned on the March 20 episode of Raw, being kidnapped by James to lure Stratus in to saving her but James was successful and attacked Stratus.

==== SmackDown! (2006–2007) ====
Three months later after being once again absent, she returned to television on June 2, this time on SmackDown!, as a special guest commentator during a match between Kristal Marshall and Jillian Hall. On the edition of June 9 of SmackDown!, Massaro defeated Marshall, Hall and Michelle McCool in a bikini contest. On July 21 in SmackDown!, she won her debut match with the brand, in which she teamed up with Jillian Hall to defeat McCool and Marshall. Two days later at The Great American Bash event, Massaro won a fatal four-way bra and panties match in which she defeated Hall, McCool and Marshall. On the edition of August 4 of SmackDown!, Massaro broke a knuckle on her right hand in a match against Marshall, this made her be out of action for four weeks.

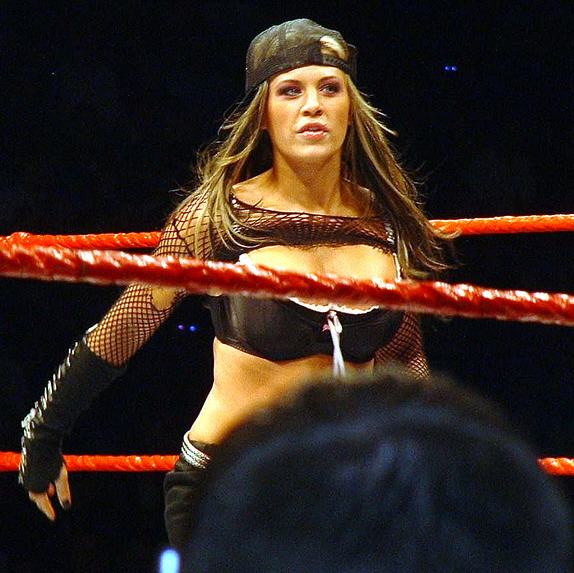
Massaro during a house show in November 2007

She came back on September 8, teaming with Paul London and Brian Kendrick to defeat Idol Stevens, KC James and Michelle McCool in a Six-Person Mixed Tag Team match. Following the victory, Massaro became the valet for London and Kendrick, accompanying them to the ring for their matches on SmackDown! and pay-per-views. On the October 27 episode of SmackDown!, Massaro participated in a "Trick or Treat Battle Royal" which was won by Kristal. On December 17, 2006, at a SmackDown! roster only exclusive pay-per-view by the name of Armageddon Massaro competed in a 4-Way SmackDown! women's Santa's little helpers Lingerie contest against Layla El, Kristal Marshall and Jillian Hall but the contest ended in a draw due to everyone winning via Santa's choice. On the December 22 episode of SmackDown!, Massaro teamed up with Layla in a winning effort defeating Jillian Hall and Kristal in a tag-team match. On the January 5 episode of SmackDown!, Massaro competed against Hall in a winning effort. On the January 26 episode of SmackDown!, Massaro teamed up with London and Kendrick in a losing effort to the MNM (Mercury & Nitro & Melina) in a six-person mixed-tag-team match. During the February 16, 2007, episode of SmackDown!, Massaro unveiled her Playboy cover. Surrounding the release of the magazine, Massaro engaged in a feud with Jillian Hall, who was envious of the attention Massaro received due to the Playboy cover. At No Way Out, Massaro won the first ever Diva Invitational by removing her top to reveal her breasts which were covered with Playboy bunny pasties.

Massaro also began a feud with then WWE Women's Champion, Raw's Melina, who was angry over the publicity Massaro had been receiving because of the cover. On the March 9 episode of SmackDown!, the rivalry was taken to the next level when a catfight broke out on the inaugural edition of Miz TV. On the March 16 episode of SmackDown!, Ashley teamed up with London and Kendrick in a losing effort to MNM in a six-person mixed-tag-team match. On the March 23 episode of SmackDown!, Massaro would get a catfight after Melina attempted to make an interference during Kendrick and Paul's match with MNM. On the March 26 episode of Raw, Massaro teamed up with Torrie Wilson and Candice Michelle in a winning effort defeating Melina, Hall and Victoria. At WrestleMania 23, Massaro unsuccessfully challenged Melina for the WWE Women's Championship in a LumberJill match to retain her title.

After WrestleMania, Massaro continued as a valet for WWE Tag Team Champions Paul London and Brian Kendrick. In storyline, on the April 13 episode of SmackDown!, Massaro was attacked by Jillian Hall. In reality, Massaro had loosened a screw in her ankle, which had been inserted the previous year after she legitimately fractured her tibia and fibula while in a battle royal. Massaro returned on the June 1, 2007, episode of SmackDown!, helping McCool defeat Hall after she distracted her. This return was short-lived when on the edition of June 8 of SmackDown!, Massaro was suspended indefinitely after accidentally spilling Vince McMahon's coffee on him. In reality, Massaro was taking time off to participate on the show Survivor.

==== Various storylines (2008) ====
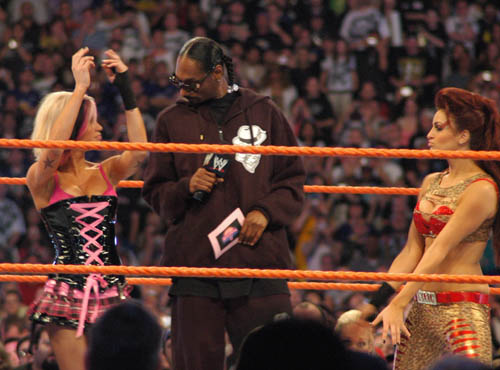
Massaro along with her tag team partner Maria and Snoop Dogg at WrestleMania XXIV in March 2008

Massaro returned on January 7, 2008, to the Raw brand, winning a Lingerie Pillow Fight against Maria, Jillian Hall, Melina, and Mickie James. On the January 14 episode of Raw, Massaro teamed up with Mickie James and Maria in a losing effort to the team of Beth Phoenix, Jillian Hall, and Melina in a 6 person-tag-team match. Massaro began a storyline with Maria and Santino Marella on the January 21, 2008, episode of Raw, attempting to convince Maria to pose for Playboy but was interrupted by Marella. At the Royal Rumble pay-per-view, Massaro again attempted to convince Maria by telling her that Hugh Hefner wanted her to pose for Playboy before Maria could answer Marella interrupted and objected to the proposal. Massaro would then beat down Marella's surprise Big Dick Johnson when he attempted to perform a striptease. At the No Way Out pay-per-view, Massaro would appear with Maria in a segment at the Playboy Mansion. On the March 24, 2008, episode of Raw, Massaro interfered in the match between Maria and Melina. After the match, Santino Marella came down to the ring, so Jerry "The King" Lawler (who was tired of Marella's actions over previous weeks) knocked Santino out of the ring. Which set up the six-person mixed-tag-team match, in which they lost to Marella, Melina and Phoenix. On March 30, 2008, Massaro replaced Candice Michelle, who was out with an injury, in the Playboy Bunnymania Lumberjack match at WrestleMania XXIV teaming up with Maria, losing to Beth Phoenix and Melina after the interference from Marella.

On the April 14 episode of Raw, Massaro teamed up with Maria in a losing effort to the team of Melina and Hall in a tag-team match. Massaro also participated in a 12 wrestler Tag Team match at Backlash, where Phoenix pinned her to get the win for her team. On the April 28 episode of Raw, Massaro competed in her last match by teaming up with Michelle McCool, Cherry, Kelly Kelly, Maria and James in a winning effort defeating Layla, Melina, Phoenix, Natalya, Hall and Victoria. Massaro was released from her WWE contract on July 9, 2008. A week prior to her release, she announced that she had asked to be let go from her contract due to her daughter being sick.

=== Independent circuit (2017) ===
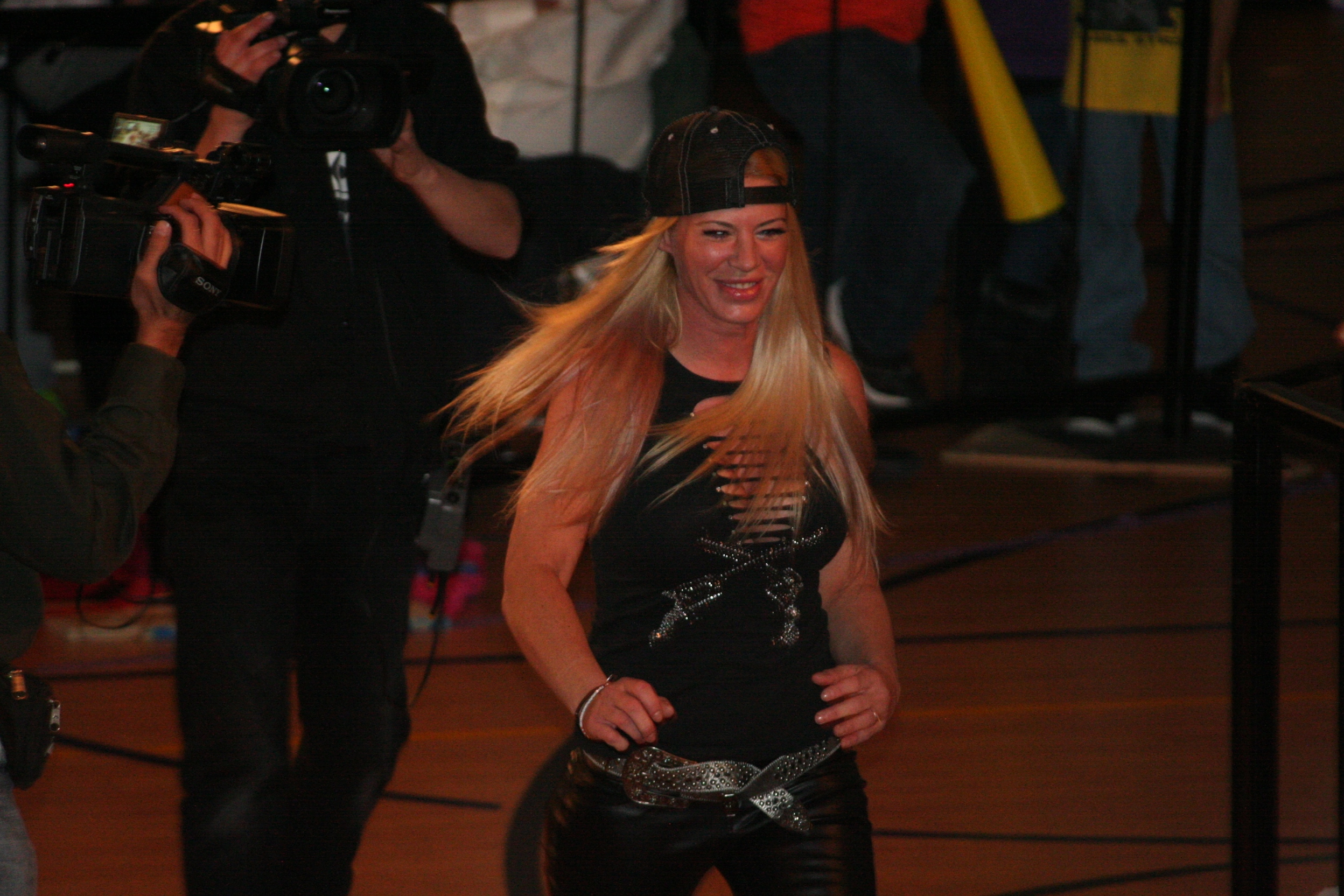
Massaro in 2013

In September 2017, Massaro made a brief return to professional wrestling by managing in Zero1 Professional Wrestling USA with former WWE Diva Jillian Hall.

== Other media ==
=== Survivor ===
Massaro was a contestant on CBS's Survivor: China, the fifteenth season of the show, in 2007. Massaro approached the WWE with the idea of doing the show, and after going through the casting process, she found out she made the show ten days before she had to leave for China to film. Prior to the experience, Massaro had never been camping before, so to train for the show she had to get used to being out in nature. She was assigned to the Zhan Hu tribe in the first episode and quickly began quarreling with fellow contestant Dave Cruser. In the second episode, Massaro was voted off after six days with a 6–1 vote.

=== Modeling and acting ===
Massaro competed in Miss Hawaiian Tropic pageants and was crowned Miss Hawaiian Tropic USA in 2002 and Miss Hawaiian Tropic Canada in August 2004. Massaro appeared in FHM, Stuff, Maxim, and on the cover of Playboy after joining WWE, though she had previously posed for Playboy in 2003 and 2004. Massaro tried out for Playboy scouts when they were searching for models for the 50th Anniversary Playmate Hunt. She appeared in the accompanying pictorial in the December 2003. In addition, she appeared in both Femme Fatales and Flex magazines. Massaro also hosted several E! channel Wild On! episodes and appeared on Breaking Bonaduce as Danny Bonaduce's personal trainer. Massaro guest starred on an episode of Extreme Makeover: Home Edition alongside WWE wrestlers John Cena and Batista. In addition, she appeared in campaign ads for both Hawaiian Tropic and Yamaha.

In February 2007, Massaro and Glenn "Kane" Jacobs filmed an episode of the CW's Smallville that aired on March 22, 2007. In April 2007, Massaro also appeared as a guest on Fuse TV's show The Sauce. On April 20, 2007, Massaro and several other female wrestlers filmed Timbaland's video, "Throw It on Me" featuring the Hives. In 2008, she appeared in Rev Theory's video for "Hell Yeah."

=== Video games ===
Massaro appeared in two WWE video games. She made her in-game debut in WWE SmackDown vs. Raw 2008 and returned in WWE SmackDown vs. Raw 2009.

=== Radio ===
On June 30, 2018, Massaro began working as a radio DJ for Long Island station WWSK-FM / 94.3 The Shark where she originally worked the Saturday portion from 10 am to 3 pm. Shortly before her death in May 2019, she was promoted to hosting the station's evening program on Wednesday nights.

== Personal life ==
Massaro had one child, a daughter. In mid-2008, after her daughter became ill, Massaro requested an early release from her WWE contract in order to focus on caring for her daughter. On May 22, 2019, after Massaro's death, several former WWE female wrestlers who were Massaro's coworkers, grouped as "The Squared Circle Sisters", opened a crowdfunding campaign on GoFundMe in order to create a college fund for her daughter, setting a goal of $100,000.

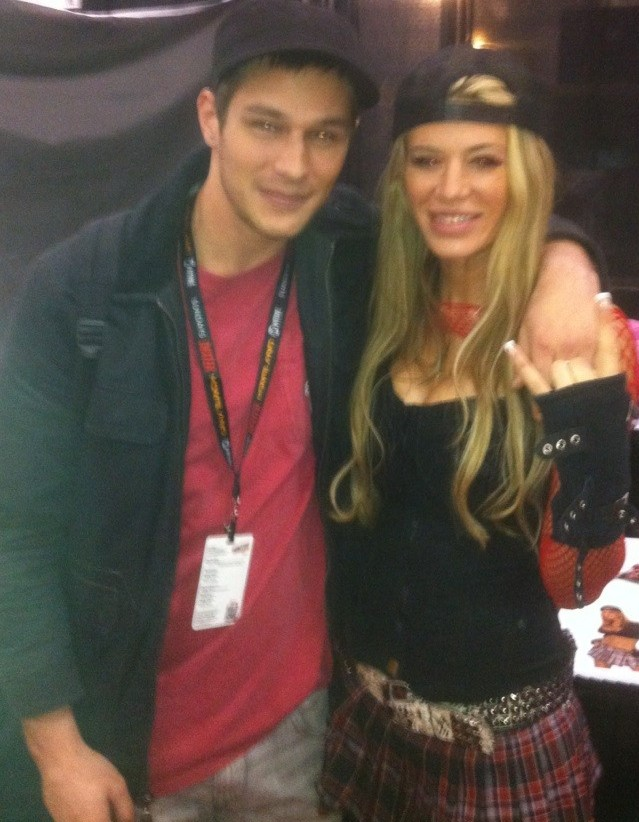
Massaro with her brother in 2012

On November 21, 2020, Massaro's younger brother, Ronnie Massaro, was stabbed to death in New York City at the age of 39. He was buried in the same cemetery as her, the St. James Episcopal.

Massaro had several tattoos, including a black and pink nautical star on the back of both of her elbows, a pink and red dragon surrounding Hanzi lettering that translates to "Trust No One" going down the right side of her torso, symbols on the small of her lower back, and a butterfly on her right hip. She also had several piercings, including a Monroe and snakebites.

=== WWE lawsuit and sexual assault ===
In November 2016, Massaro joined a class action lawsuit against WWE, litigated by Konstantine Kyros, who has been involved in a number of other lawsuits against the company, alleging that the company concealed risks of injury that caused them neurological damage. Massaro also alleged that she was sexually assaulted at a US military base during a WWE tour of Kuwait by a man posing as a doctor, and that WWE apologized but persuaded her to not report it to the appropriate authorities as they did not want it to affect the company's relationship with the military. The lawsuit was dismissed in late 2018.

After her death, WWE said they had received an email from Massaro in October 2018 in which she expressed regret for having taken part in the lawsuit. An affidavit by Massaro describing the sexual abuse allegations in detail was subsequently released by the law firm that represented her after her death. WWE later said executives there were not informed of the allegations described in the affidavit.

Despite previous denials from WWE about having knowledge of her allegation, in February 2024 an attorney representing former WWE Head of Talent Relations John Laurinaitis stated that: "most upper level management at sometime became aware of the allegations and ensured all proper WWE protocols were followed, including privacy for the alleged victim." That month, Vice News reported that the Naval Criminal Investigative Service had investigated Massaro's allegations from June 2019 to January 2020, although no further information about the investigation is known at this time. A further report by Vice News revealed that Massaro had accused WWE promoter Vince McMahon of "preying on female WWE wrestlers" and that she believed he had tried to sabotage her career after she rejected an advance from him.

=== Epstein files ===
In January 2026, Massaro was named in the Epstein files as a possible employee of Ghislaine Maxwell, the convicted main accomplice of child sex trafficker Jeffrey Epstein. In a redacted complaint, the claimant wrote "...She mentioned horrible things happening in the island [...] including [sic] dead body of a girl that 'had mask and was tied to a tree'. She said that 'the one from London was very mean and also the one from Miami.' Also that the man in the mention was making her [sic] fucking black guys and he liked to watch it, she was young – high school student [...] she also said that her friend Ashley Massarow [sic] (who died in 2019 – the WWE) got pregnant in high school. They both worked for Maxwell and Mechella from Miami Florida." (A "Jane Mechella" was named in the complaint, although it is unclear from the text who she actually was.)

== Death ==
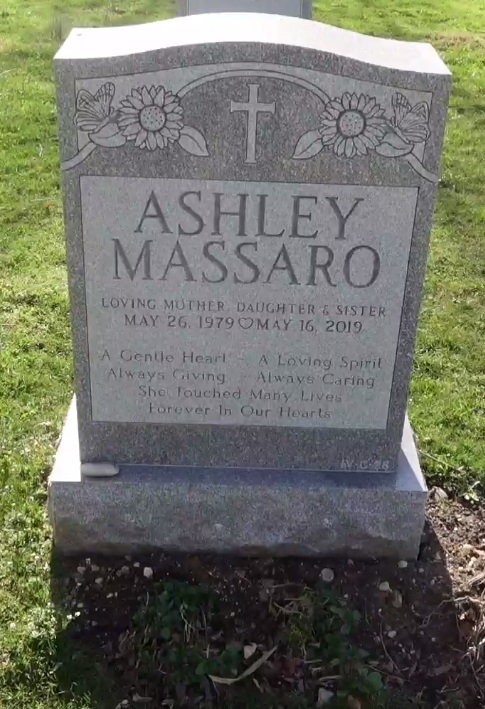
Grave of Massaro located in the Saint James Episcopal Church Cemetery in St. James, New York

On May 15, 2019, Massaro finished replying to fan mail, but did not show up for work at WWSK-FM later that night, prompting another DJ to fill in for her. At 5:23 a.m. the next morning, paramedics responded to a rescue call and discovered Massaro unresponsive at her home in Smithtown, New York. When they arrived at the hospital, she was pronounced dead.

On May 19 at the Money in the Bank pay-per-view event, WWE acknowledged Massaro's death by projecting a graphic of her at the start of the show. Visitation for Massaro was held that day and the next at the Branch Funeral Home in Smithtown. On May 21, she was buried at the Saint James Episcopal Church Cemetery in St. James, New York.

At the time of her death some news outlets, all citing the website TMZ, stated Massaro's death as a suicide. Others, including CNN and The Nation, did not. The Suffolk County medical examiner's office did not release an official cause of death, citing a New York state privacy law that allows withholding information that "would constitute an unwarranted invasion of personal privacy". In September 2021, a USA Today article stated that she had died by suicide, and wrote that her death (along with the suicides of wrestlers Hana Kimura and Daffney in the succeeding two years) had spurred a conversation about mental health in the professional wrestling industry.

Massaro had taken part in a suicide prevention music video by her WWSK co-worker Brian Orlando, who had recorded a song with Brandon B. Brown, Vinnie Dombroski, and Kevin Martin. Following her death, Orlando scrapped plans to release the video. With her family's blessing, it was released in July 2020.

== Filmography ==
=== Television ===
Year	Title	Role	Notes
2007	Smallville	Athena	Episode: "Combat"
2007	Extreme Makeover: Home Edition	Herself	
2007	Survivor: China	Herself	15th place

=== Music videos ===
Year	Title	Role	Notes
2007	"Throw It on Me"	Herself	
2008	"Hell Yeah"	Herself	

== Championships and accomplishments ==
=== Beauty pageant ===
- Hawaiian Tropic
  - Miss Hawaiian Tropic Canada (2004)
  - Miss Hawaiian Tropic USA (2002)

=== Professional wrestling ===
- World Wrestling Entertainment
  - WWE Diva Search (2005)

== See also ==
- List of premature professional wrestling deaths
