= WWE Raw Homecoming =

Professional wrestling event

Raw Homecoming
- DVD cover for the event featuring Vince McMahon and various wrestlers
- Promotion: WWE
- Date: October 3, 2005
- City: Dallas, Texas
- Venue: American Airlines Center
- Attendance: 14,837
- Tagline: The Power is Back

Raw special episodes chronology
← Previous —	Next → Raw 1000

Raw Homecoming was a television special that was broadcast live on October 3, 2005 on the USA Network. It was named as such because it was the first edition of WWE's flagship show Monday Night Raw to air on the USA Network since 2000, after airing on Spike TV (currently known as the Paramount Network) for the previous five years.

The card featured six matches (including a dark match) and multiple segments featuring many returning legends and former superstars. The undercard saw a 30-minute Iron Man match between Kurt Angle and Shawn Michaels end in a draw, and Edge defeat Matt Hardy in a "loser leaves Raw" Money in the bank ladder match. The main event saw John Cena defeat Raw General Manager Eric Bischoff to retain the WWE Championship.

The episode averaged a viewership of 4.4 million.

== Background ==
The card consisted of seven matches, including one dark match, that resulted from scripted storylines and had results predetermined by WWE's writers on the Raw brand. Storylines were produced on WWE's weekly television shows, Monday Night Raw and SmackDown!. Raw first aired on January 11, 1993, and since became the longest-running weekly episodic program in television history with no reruns.

On June 28, 2000, Viacom, the parent company of UPN, which aired WWF SmackDown!, won the rights of all WWF programming (including Raw Is War) for $12.6 million after the World Wrestling Federation Entertainment, Inc. (WWFE) sued USA Network over the right of first refusal contractual dispute ruled in Delaware court. The new television contract and the subsequent purchase of competitor WCW led to many changes in WWF's programming content. Raw Is War premiered on TNN on September 25, 2000. After five years, on March 10, 2005, Viacom and WWE decided not to go on with the agreement with Spike TV, effectively ending Raw and other WWE programs' tenure on the network. On April 4, 2005, WWE announced a three-year deal with NBCUniversal to bring Raw back to its former home, the USA Network, with two yearly specials on NBC and a Spanish Raw on Telemundo. The final Raw aired on Spike TV on September 26, 2005.

== Matches ==
=== Dark match ===
Before the event officially started, Shelton Benjamin defeated Tyson Tomko in a match taped for Heat.

=== Preliminary matches ===
The opening match of the evening was a 30-minute Iron Man match between Kurt Angle and Shawn Michaels. Angle delivered a top-rope Angle Slam for a three-count and the first point. Michaels pinned Angle with an inside cradle to make the score 1–1. Angle forced Michaels to tap out to the ankle lock to make the score 2–1. Michaels delivered Sweet Chin Music to make the score 2–2. In the match's climax, Michaels hit a Sweet Chin Music and was about to pin Angle before time ran out, rendering the match a draw. Michaels offered Angle to go into sudden death overtime, but Angle refused and walked out.

Next, Edge (with Lita) took on Matt Hardy in a loser leaves Raw ladder match for Edge's Money in the Bank contract. After a back-and-forth match, Edge tied up Hardy in the ropes and Lita assisted in holding him there. He then scaled the ladder to retrieve the briefcase. Afterwards, Hardy was escorted out of the arena by security guards.

The next match was Triple H and Ric Flair taking on Carlito and Chris Masters. In the end, Triple H pinned Masters after hitting the Pedigree to win. While celebrating after the match, Triple H abruptly turned on Flair and hit him with a sledgehammer, marking the end of Evolution after more than two years since 2003.

The fifth match was a bra and panties match between Trish Stratus and Ashley vs Candice Michelle, Torrie Wilson and Victoria. Stratus removed Wilson's pants to win the match for her team.

The penultimate match was a six-man tag team match featuring wrestlers from the SmackDown! brand. Batista, Chris Benoit and Rey Mysterio were due to face Christian, Eddie Guerrero and John "Bradshaw" Layfield (JBL), however Raw General Manager Eric Bischoff would appear on stage and cancel the match immediately after it started, rendering it a no contest. The match did take place on SmackDown! that week.

=== Main event ===
The main event saw John Cena defend the WWE Championship against Eric Bischoff. Despite early offense by Bischoff and interference by Kurt Angle, Cena managed to mount a comeback and quickly defeat Bischoff to retain. Following the match, SmackDown! General Manager Theodore Long would send out the entire SmackDown! roster to invade Raw as revenge for Eric Bischoff cancelling their tag team match earlier.

== Results ==
No.	Results	Stipulations	Times
1^{D}	Shelton Benjamin defeated Tyson Tomko	Singles match	5:00
2	Kurt Angle vs. Shawn Michaels ended in a draw (2-2)	30-minute Iron Man match	30:00
3	Edge (with Lita) defeated Matt Hardy	Loser Leaves Raw & Money In The Bank Ladder match	13:56
4	Ric Flair and Triple H defeated Carlito and Chris Masters	Tag team match	9:54
5	Ashley and Trish Stratus defeated Vince's Devils (Candice Michelle, Torrie Wilson and Victoria)	Three-on-two bra and panties handicap match	3:42
6	Batista, Chris Benoit and Rey Mysterio vs. Christian, Eddie Guerrero and John Bradshaw Layfield ended in a no contest	Six-man tag team match	—
7	John Cena (c) defeated Eric Bischoff	Singles match for the WWE Championship	2:44
(c) / – the champion(s) heading into the match; D / – this was a dark match

=== Iron Man match ===
Score	Winner	Decision	Times
1–0	Kurt Angle	Pinfall	8:08
1–1	Shawn Michaels	Pinfall	14:48
2–1	Kurt Angle	Submission	18:46
2–2	Shawn Michaels	Pinfall	25:14

== See also ==
- List of WWE Raw special episodes
