= Vince's Devils =

Professional wrestling stable

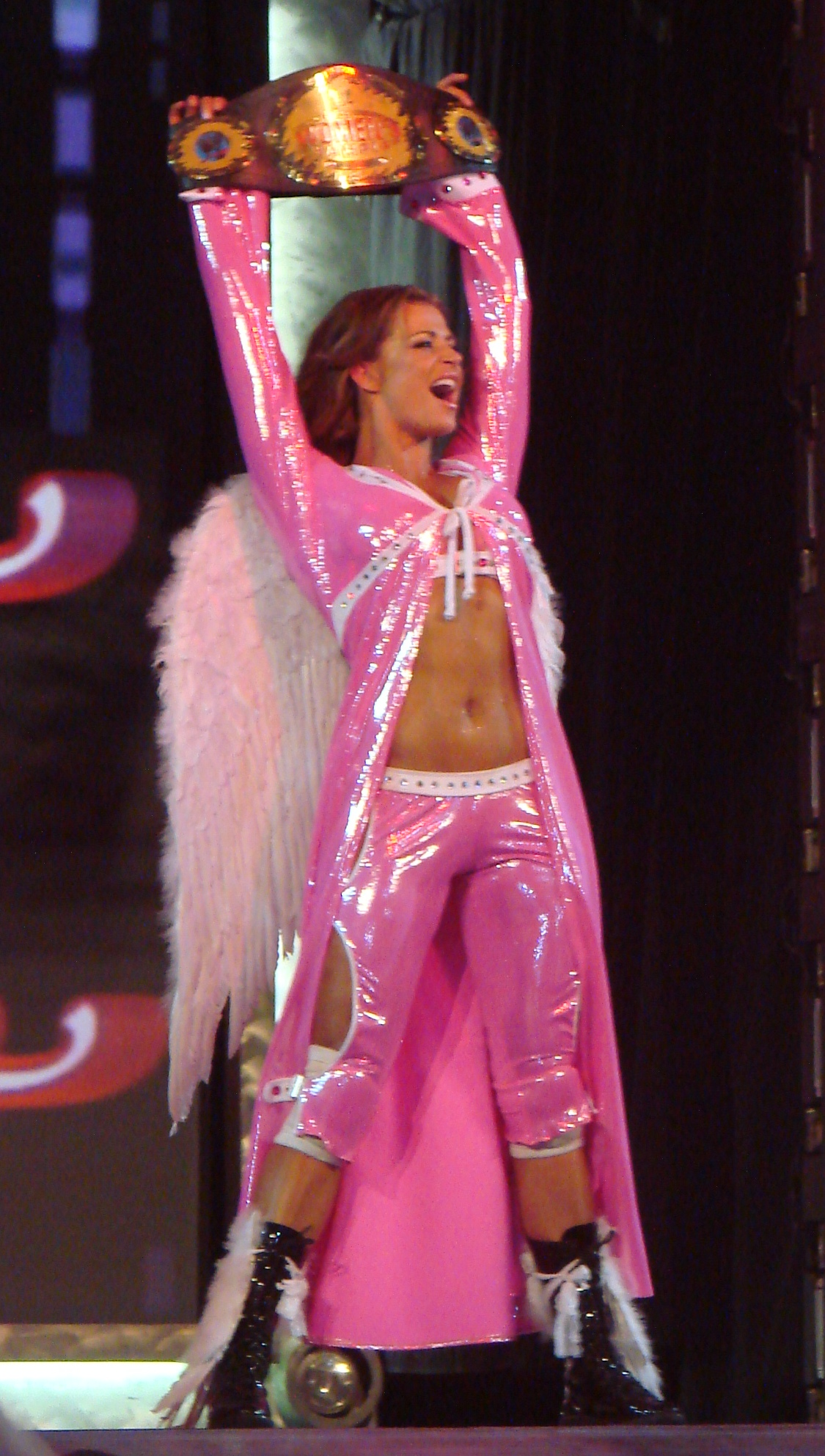
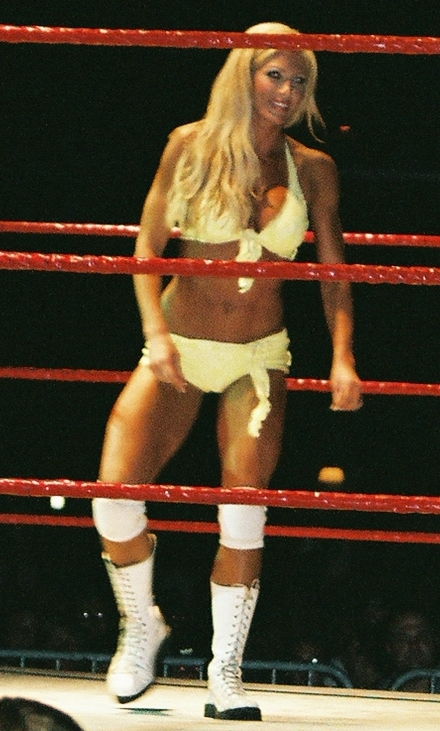
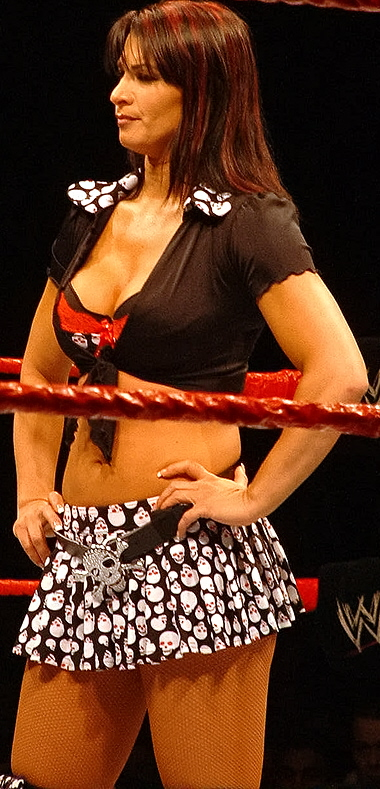
- Candice Michelle, Torrie Wilson & Victoria.

Stable
- Members: Candice Michelle; Torrie Wilson; Victoria; Chloe (Mascot)
- Name(s): Ladies in Pink; Vince's Devils
- Debut: August 22, 2005
- Years active: 2005–2006

Vince's Devils (originally known as the Ladies in Pink) was an alliance of female professional wrestlers in World Wrestling Entertainment on its Raw brand. It consisted of Divas Candice Michelle, Torrie Wilson, and Victoria. The women formed their alliance in August 2005 after Wilson and Michelle were traded to Raw from SmackDown!. Vince's Devils, named after WWE Chairman Vince McMahon, helped each other in their matches and rivalries until tension began growing between Wilson and Candice Michelle over the latter's April 2006 Playboy pictorial. The group had officially split by March 2006.

== History ==
=== Debut ===
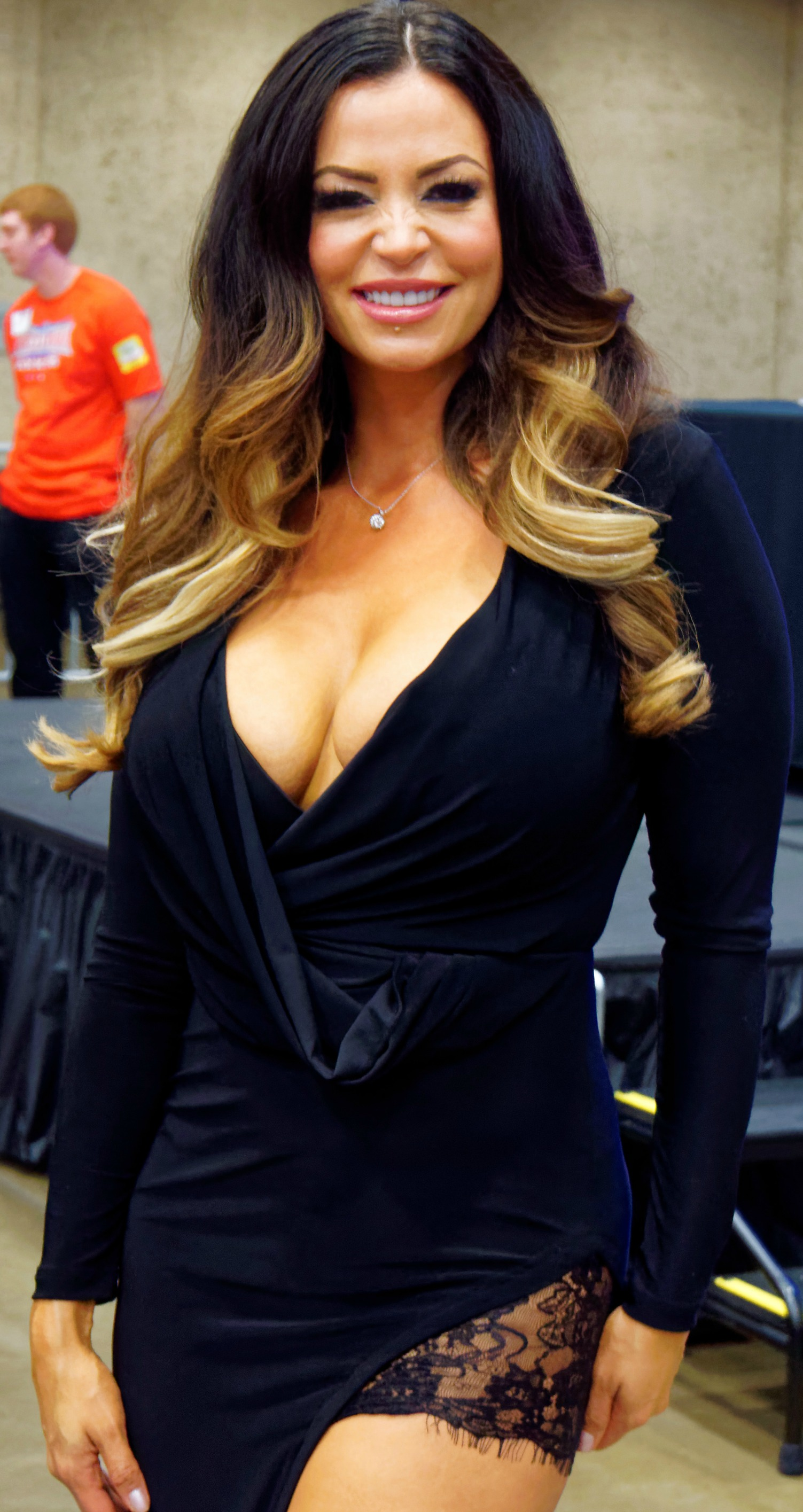
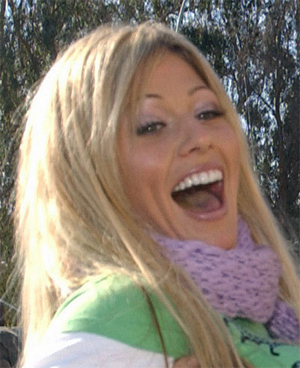
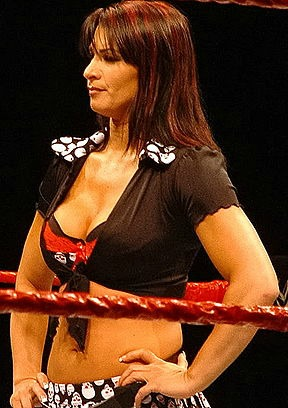
Tag team members Candice Michelle (top left) Torrie Wilson (top right) and Victoria (bottom)

In August 2005, in a trade un-aired on television, SmackDown! Divas Torrie Wilson and Candice Michelle were traded to Raw for Raw Divas Stacy Keibler and Christy Hemme, who were moved to SmackDown!. During their debut, the duo of Torrie and Candice began a new storyline when they called Diva Search 2005 winner Ashley Massaro to ringside to congratulate her for winning the competition, but instead they taunted and attacked her, becoming villains in the process. The next week, Torrie and Candice recruited the evil Victoria to join them, and the three began harassing Massaro on a regular basis. They also taunted and embarrassed her during matches.

=== Feuds ===
When Trish Stratus made her return from a legitimate back injury on September 12, she became a fan favorite by joining forces with Massaro. At Unforgiven, Victoria and Wilson lost a match against Stratus and Massaro. The following night on Raw on September 19th Torrie Wilson lost again to women's champion Trish Stratus in a singles match. At WWE Homecoming, they lost for a third time in a Bra and Panties Handicap match when they were stripped by their opponents.

For several weeks afterward, Wilson was absent from television due to personal issues she had to attend to off-screen. On November 28, Wilson returned to the group to participate in a six-woman tag team match. Wilson's dog Chloe became an official member of the group on December 26 when she interfered in one of Victoria's matches and became the first dog to have her own WWE.com profile. At Taboo Tuesday in November, Candice Michelle was eliminated from the Fulfill Your Fantasy Battle Royal for the WWE Women's Championship by former rival Ashley Massaro.

On the January 2 episode of Raw, the Ladies in Pink turned their attention to backstage announcer Maria Kanellis, blaming her for Victoria's loss in a match. Victoria announced to Maria that they had a match scheduled that night and proceeded to attack her before the bell. Although Victoria seemed to have the advantage in the match, which included interference from Wilson and Chloe, Victoria was pinned after she attempted an offensive maneuver but missed and ran into the turnbuckle, allowing Maria to pin her. After the match, Candice Michelle, Wilson, and Victoria attacked Maria until Ashley Massaro ran down to the ring to assist Maria. The conflict between the Divas caused the Chairman, Vince McMahon, to make a Bra and Panties Gauntlet match at New Year's Revolution, which Massaro won when she eliminated Victoria by removing her shorts. The next night on Raw, the Ladies in Pink announced that they had changed the name of their alliance to Vince's Devils. The storyline rivalry with Massaro continued on the January 23 episode of Raw, when Victoria and Candice Michelle were defeated by Trish Stratus and Massaro in a tag team match. At the Royal Rumble on January 29, the three women were shown in backstage segments flirting with McMahon.

=== Split ===
By February, Candice Michelle had announced that she was going to be on the cover of the April edition of Playboy magazine, and tension began to grow between Candice Michelle and Torrie Wilson. After winning a number one contender's Diva battle royal on Raw in which she first eliminated Wilson and then Mickie James and Ashley at the same time, Candice Michelle received her first singles WWE Women's Championship match, but she lost to champion Trish Stratus on February 27. After the match, Candice Michelle slapped Wilson, blaming her, in storyline, for the loss. As a result of the tension between the women, Wilson became a fan favorite, while Candice Michelle and Victoria continued to act as villains on-screen.

On March 13, during Victoria's Women's Championship match, Wilson ran down and gave Victoria a facebuster costing her the victory. Later in the broadcast, it had appeared that Candice Michelle and Victoria may have gotten their revenge as Trish Stratus found an unconscious Wilson laid out in the Divas' Locker room with Candice's Playboy magazine lying across Wilson. At WrestleMania 22, Wilson gained revenge by defeating the evil Candice Michelle in a Playboy Pillow Fight match. On the June 12 episode of Raw, Wilson defeated Candice Michelle in the first ever Wet and Wild match, a wrestling match involving water balloons and squirt guns, in which the winner of the match would be on the cover of the WWE 2006 Summer Special magazine.
