= Torrie Wilson =

American professional wrestler (born 1975)

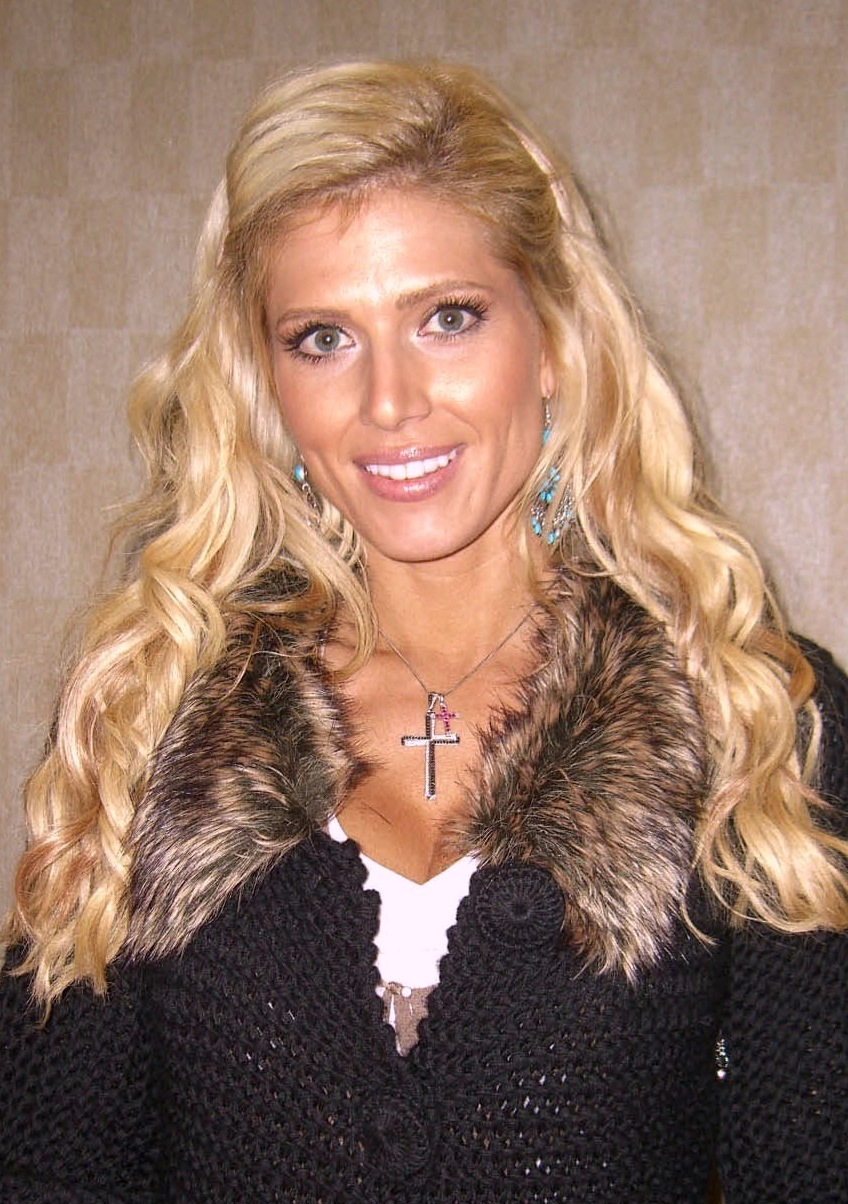
- Wilson in 2010

Personal information
- Born: Torrie Anne Wilson; July 24, 1975 (age 51) Boise, Idaho, U.S.
- Spouses: Billy Kidman (m. 2003; div. 2008) Justin Tupper (m. 2019)
- Children: 1

Professional wrestling career
- Ring name(s): Samantha; Torrie Wilson
- Billed height: 5 ft 9 in (175 cm)
- Billed weight: 133 lb (60 kg)
- Billed from: Boise, Idaho
- Trained by: Dave Finlay; John Laurinaitis; Billy Kidman
- Debut: February 8, 1999
- Retired: May 8, 2008
- Occupations: Professional wrestler; fitness trainer; model
- Known for: WCW Monday Nitro; WWE Raw; WWE Smackdown

Signature
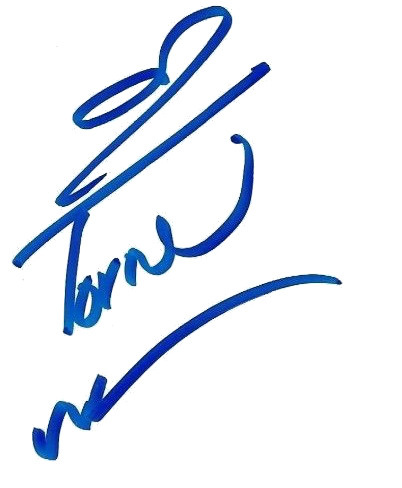

Torrie Anne Wilson (born July 24, 1975) is an American retired professional wrestler, model and fitness competitor. She is best known for her tenures in WWE and WCW.

As a fitness competitor, Wilson won the Miss Galaxy competition in 1999. Shortly after, she was signed by World Championship Wrestling (WCW), where she stayed from 1999 until 2000. In 2001, she made her debut on World Wrestling Federation (WWF) television as part of The Invasion (by WCW, of the [then-] WWF) storyline. Her most high-profile storylines took place in 2002 when she feuded with Dawn Marie, and 2003 with Sable. Wilson was part of the all-female stable (i.e., a group of storyline-associated characters) known as Vince's Devils, which ended its run in 2006.

Wilson has been on the cover of several magazines, including FHM and Playboy, which Wilson posed for twice, once along with Sable.

Wilson was inducted into the WWE Hall of Fame in 2019.

== Early life ==
Torrie Anne Wilson was born on July 24, 1975, in Boise, Idaho, where she was also raised. She says that, while growing up, she was painfully shy. Wilson found her niche in many school activities, including cheerleading, dance, and track and field.

During her sophomore year of high school, after Wilson's interest in modeling grew more serious, her mother urged her to pursue it. They visited an agency and were informed that Wilson would have to lose weight to be considered for jobs. In the process of losing weight, she began a bout with anorexia and then bulimia that lasted from around the age of 15 to 19.

After recovering from the disorder, Wilson became involved in fitness. She began eating six meals a day and working out. She placed third in her first competition, and she later won the Miss Galaxy competition in 1998. She then spent some time on the Extreme Fitness Team. As part of the Women's Tri-Fitness Championships in 1998, Wilson won first place in the Grace and Physique round.

Later in 1998, Wilson moved to Los Angeles to pursue acting. She began acting classes and was introduced to an agent who helped her gain a few jobs. Wilson was approached by World Championship Wrestling through an agent in 1999 for a gig of only a couple of months. However, her popularity snowballed her character into a full-time role.

== Professional wrestling career ==
=== World Championship Wrestling (1999–2000) ===
Wilson's start in wrestling came when she attended a World Championship Wrestling (WCW) show with her boyfriend in 1999. After going backstage, she was asked to walk out to the ring with Scott Steiner. Later, Kevin Nash expressed an interest in doing a storyline with her. She first appeared on the February 8, 1999, episode of Nitro (later named "Samantha"). It was revealed, in the storyline, that Wilson was brought in by the New World Order (nWo) to seduce David Flair into turning against his father, Ric Flair. They appeared together on February 21 at SuperBrawl IX when Wilson slapped Ric, and David zapped him with a taser. After Ric won the WCW World Heavyweight Championship from Hollywood Hogan at Uncensored inside a Barbed Wire Steel Cage match, David and Wilson took some time off from WCW television in April before returning in May, when Wilson would accompany David to the ring for matches. At the 1999 Bash at the Beach, Wilson acted as a valet for Flair as he successfully defended the WCW United States Heavyweight Championship against Dean Malenko.

She continued to accompany David to the ring until September when David was on the telephone with Wilson and later found out that Wilson was in the Filthy Animals' locker room flirting with Billy Kidman, which resulted in a feud between Flair and Kidman. On the October 18, 1999, episode of Nitro, Wilson turned on him, resulting in Flair losing the match and the Animals beating on him; after the Animals stopped assaulting David, Wilson left with the Filthy Animals. It was around this time that Wilson began managing Kidman and his Filthy Animals teammates. As a result, she found herself involved in the Animals continuing feud with The Revolution. On the November 22, 1999, episode of Nitro, during a tag team match between Kidman and Konnan facing Creative Control for the WCW World Tag Team Championship, Kidman looked up at the Turnertron and saw that Wilson and Eddie Guerrero were shown flirting inside his locker room on the "Kidcam", a hidden camera segment, which led to a storyline feud between Kidman and Guerrero. Following this, Wilson once again disappeared from television. Wilson however returned on the January 19, 2000, episode of Thunder managing Kidman, and in April 2000, Kidman and Wilson joined a stable known as the New Blood, making them both villainous characters. As part of their newest storyline, Kidman became jealous of the attention Wilson began to give to fellow New Blood member Horace Hogan. In June, Wilson gave Kidman a hit at the Great American Bash, causing him to lose to Horace's uncle, Hulk Hogan.

Wilson was taken off of television following the encounter, reappearing at July's Bash at the Beach during a match between Shane Douglas and Buff Bagwell. After the match, Wilson and Douglas left together, which led to a feud between Kidman and Douglas. At September's Fall Brawl, Wilson and Douglas defeated Kidman and Madusa in a mixed tag team match with scaffolding erected above the ring. Wilson was released from WCW in December 2000.

=== World Wrestling Federation/Entertainment (2001-2008) ===
==== The Invasion and feuding with Dawn Marie (2001–2003) ====
Wilson made her television debut as a heel on the June 28, 2001, episode of SmackDown! as part of The Alliance during the Invasion angle in 2001. In her first storyline with the company, she portrayed Vince McMahon's latest affair. She also regularly teamed with fellow WCW performer Stacy Keibler. The duo made their wrestling debuts in a Bra and Panties match against Lita and Trish Stratus at the InVasion pay-per-view, which Stratus and Lita won by stripping Keibler and Wilson to their yellow and white bikinis. The following night on Raw, Wilson defeated Stratus in a Paddle on a Pole match. Despite her relative lack of in-ring experience, Wilson, alongside Keibler and Ivory, regularly feuded with the Divas, as well as interfering in matches on behalf of other wrestlers in The Alliance.

She became a face during the Invasion storyline when her character began an on-screen romance with Tajiri. This new romance caused the evil Stacy Keibler to turn against Wilson, and as a result of this, Wilson defected to the WWF. Wilson defeated Keibler in the first lingerie match at No Mercy. When the first brand separation of the company roster took place in March 2002, Wilson was drafted to the SmackDown! brand. Shortly after this, as part of the storyline, Tajiri soon became jealous over the increased attention that Wilson received from other men, so he forced her to wear a geisha outfit, and he also appeared to mistreat her in matches. She depantsed Rico on the April 25, 2002, version of SmackDown!. Wilson finally grew tired of this, and during Tajiri's match against The Hurricane, she got on top of the announcer's table and stripped off her clothing. The distraction allowed The Hurricane to pick up the win. At Rebellion, Wilson and her real life boyfriend at the time Billy Kidman defeated John Cena and Dawn Marie in an intergender tag team match. After the match, Wilson and Kidman kissed. Wilson then got her first WWE Women's Championship match on SmackDown! after Women's Champion Molly Holly invaded the show interrupting Wilson's photoshoot and challenging her to a match in which Wilson was unsuccessful in winning.

Wilson started a controversial feud with Dawn Marie in September 2002, in which Dawn would start a relationship with Wilson's real-life father Al Wilson. On the October 17 episode of SmackDown!, Wilson teamed up with Rikishi in a losing effort to the team of Dawn and Matt Hardy In response, Wilson defeated Dawn at No Mercy in October. Soon afterwards, Dawn would get engaged to Al, and told Wilson that she would break it off if she spent a night in a hotel room with her, though Dawn would later reveal this was a lie. Dawn would eventually show footage of this at Armageddon. The feud continued into 2003 when Dawn and Al got married on the January 2 episode of SmackDown! in their underwear. One week later, Al then, in storyline, died from a heart attack after having rigorous sex numerous times in succession on their honeymoon. Wilson defeated Dawn again to end the feud at the Royal Rumble in what was billed as a Stepmother vs. Stepdaughter match.

==== Playboy and various feuds (2003–2005) ====
In May 2003, Wilson appeared in a pictorial and on the cover of Playboy magazine. A few months earlier, when her pictorial was announced, a short storyline feud with Nidia developed, with the latter being jealous of the fact that Wilson was chosen for the cover and spread in the magazine. In weekly vignettes aired on SmackDown!, both Nidia and her on-screen boyfriend Jamie Noble made trips to The Playboy Mansion to complain to Hugh Hefner over his choice. On the SmackDown! after WrestleMania XIX, during a segment labeled as Wilson's Playboy Coming Out Party former Diva and Playboy covergirl Sable made her return to WWE after a four-year absence. This began a storyline between the two women where for weeks, Sable played mind games with Wilson, being friendly one moment and unfriendly the next. This all led up to a bikini contest between the two at Judgment Day, which Wilson won. After the contest, Wilson kissed the former Women's Champion Sable on the lips, showing her that there were "no hard feelings" due to Wilson's win over the WWE veteran. Continuing her feud with Noble and Nidia from earlier in the year, Wilson managed Billy Gunn upon his WWE return in the summer of 2003. The feud came to an end after Nidia and Noble both became fan favorites and sided with Gunn and Wilson. After the formation of this alliance, Wilson, Nidia, and Dawn Marie feuded with Shaniqua for a short period of time, which led to Shaniqua physically dominating Wilson and Nidia in a handicap match.

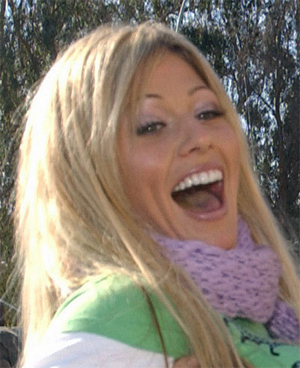
Wilson in December 2004

Wilson teamed with Sable in March 2004 to feud with Raw Divas Stacy Keibler and Miss Jackie. The feud's storyline centered on the latter duo's jealousy of Wilson and Sable as Playboy cover girls, as well as their recently being named cover girls yet again, as the two Divas were announced to be featured together in an upcoming Playboy March 2004 issue. After weeks of rivalry, Wilson and Sable defeated Keibler and Miss Jackie in a Playboy Evening Gown match at WrestleMania XX by stripping their opponents of their evening gowns. Wilson also wrestled Rene Dupree to a draw on the April 29 edition of SmackDown!. In May, Wilson began a second feud with Dawn. As part of the feud, the two had a match with Wilson's career on the line when the SmackDown! General Manager at the time, Kurt Angle, made the stipulation for the match at Judgment Day, which Wilson defeated Dawn to keep her career. Later in the year, Wilson engaged in a short feud with Sable, who defeated her at The Great American Bash. On the July 1 edition of SmackDown!, Sable was defeated by Wilson in a rematch. In November, Wilson began feuding with Hiroko. On the December 2 episode of SmackDown!, Wilson teamed up with Rey Mysterio and Rob Van Dam in winning effort against Hiroko, Kenzo Suzuki and Rene Dupree.

On February 10, 2005, on a special episode of SmackDown! (recorded on February 4 in Saitama, Japan), Torrie defeated Hiroko in a kimono match by removing her kimono first. Torrie was then involved in a short-lived feud with MNM valet Melina. On July 24 at The Great American Bash, the two of them faced in a bra and panties match with Candice Michelle as the special guest referee, in which Wilson was defeated. A rematch between both of them took place on the July 28 episode of SmackDown!, where Melina was once again victorious.

==== Vince's Devils (2005–2006) ====
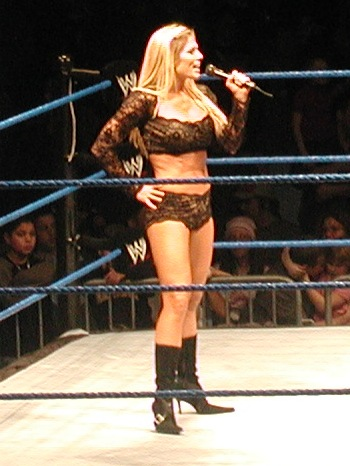
Wilson during a WWE house show in Chicago in January 2005

It was revealed on August 22, 2005, that Wilson and Candice Michelle had been moved to the Raw brand as a part of a trade in exchange for Stacy Keibler and Christy Hemme. On that night, Wilson and Candice turned heel by attacking 2005 Diva Search winner Ashley Massaro. Her and Candice's storyline feud with Massaro continued over the next couple weeks, as the duo, along with their enforcer Victoria (dubbed as the "Skankateers" by Trish Stratus), made things difficult for Massaro. On the September 5 episode of Raw, Wilson defeated Massaro after interference from Victoria and Candice. Massaro evened the score on the September 12, 2005, episode of Raw when she brought out the returning Stratus, and the duo proceeded to attack the heels. Later that night, Wilson teamed up with Victoria in a losing effort to Stratus and Massaro. This led to a tag team match at Unforgiven, where the team of Stratus and Massaro defeated Wilson and Victoria. The following night on Raw, Wilson was defeated by Stratus. After the match, Wilson, Victoria and Candice attacked Massaro and Stratus. The feud continued into WWE Homecoming, where Stratus and Massaro defeated Wilson, Candice, and Victoria in the first three on two Bra and Panties match by stripping all three of their opponents.

Wilson was absent from WWE television for quite some time after this, leading to rumors and false reports that she had been released from WWE. In actuality, she had taken a leave of absence to tend to some "personal issues". Wilson was surprised by the rumors after some media personnel offered to help her find work. WWE issued a statement on their website, in which Wilson also commented, denouncing the rumors. In the statement, she joked she had to "call the WWE office and ask them if they forgot to fire me".

On October 17, Wilson made her return to Raw, where she, Candice and Victoria faced off against the team of Stratus, Massaro, and their new ally Mickie James in a winning effort after Wilson pinned James. On the November 28 episode of Raw, Wilson teamed up with Victoria and Candice Michelle in losing effort to Stratus, Massaro and James. On the February 13 episode of Raw, Wilson was accompied by Candice in a losing effort to Massaro. Wilson soon turned face once again, after Candice and Victoria both turned against her. On the March 13 episode of Raw, Wilson helped Stratus retain the Women's Championship against Victoria who was accompanied by Candice. The following week on Raw, Wilson teamed up with Stratus to defeat Victoria and Candice. The storyline feud between Candice and Wilson led to a match where Wilson faced Playboy's newest cover girl, Candice, at WrestleMania 22 in a Playboy Pillow Fight. Wilson won the match, but the feud still continued on-and-off for some time. On the June 12, 2006, episode of Raw, Wilson defeated Candice in the first "Wet and Wild match", a wrestling match involving water balloons and squirt guns, in which the winner of the match would be on the cover of the WWE 2006 Summer Special magazine.

==== On-screen relationship with Carlito (2006–2007) ====
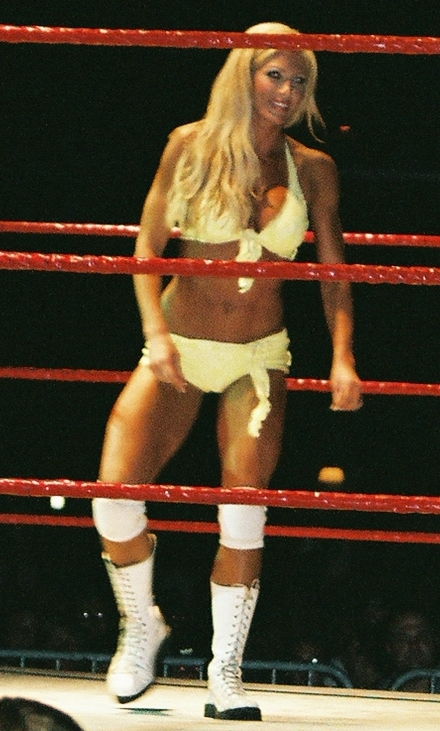
Wilson during a WWE house show in July 2006

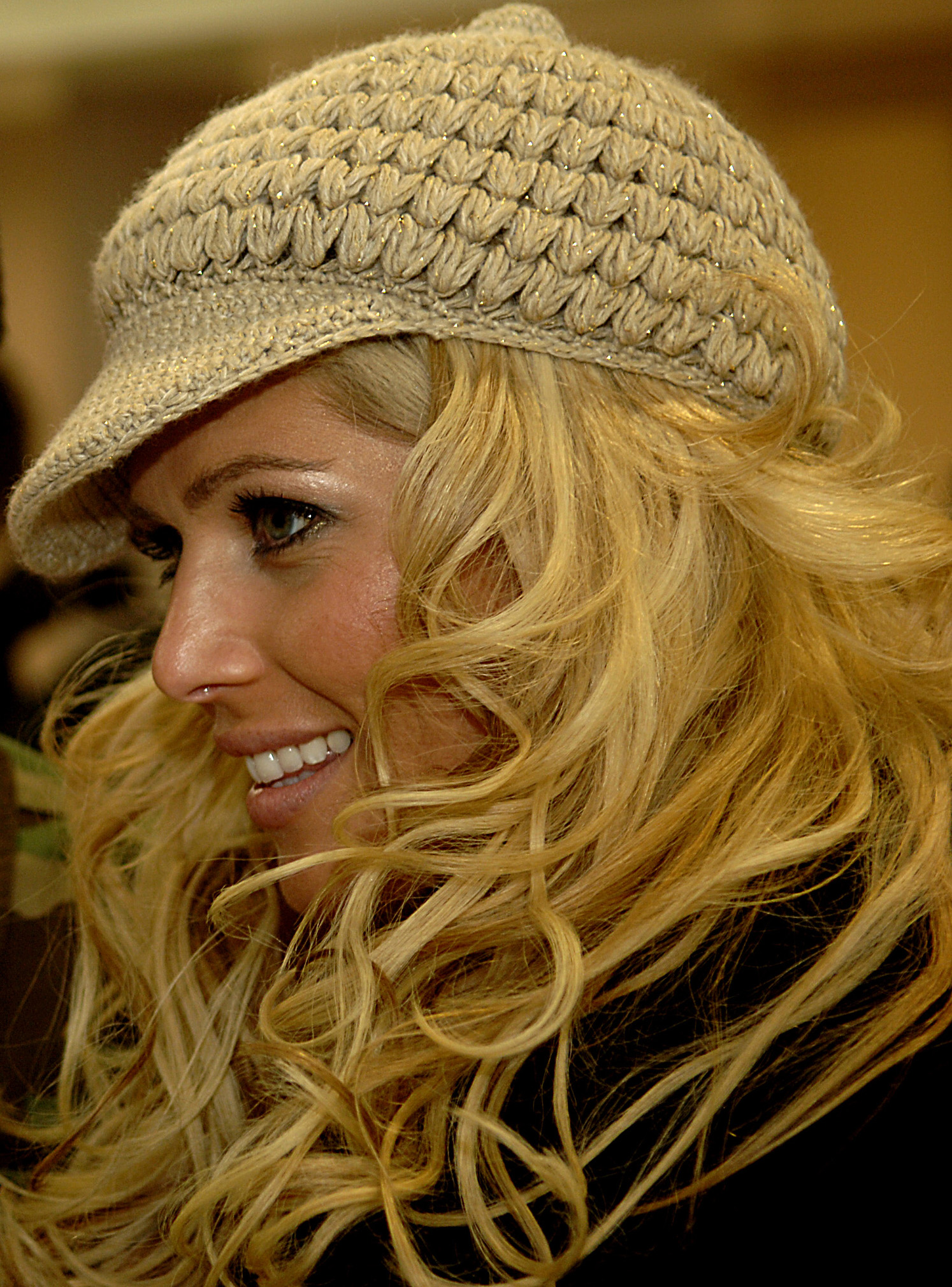
Wilson in December 2006

Wilson also made a special appearance on WWE's ECW brand on August 22, 2006, representing Raw in a bikini contest against ECW Diva Kelly Kelly. A winner was not decided, however, and a six-person mixed tag match began pitting Wilson, Tommy Dreamer, and The Sandman against the team of Kelly Kelly, Mike Knox, and Test. Wilson's team was victorious.

In the final months of 2006, Wilson entered into an on-screen relationship with Carlito. On the November 27 episode of Raw, Wilson participated in a #1 Contenders Diva Battle Royal that was won by Victoria. On the December 11 episode of Raw, Wilson was defeated by Victoria and after the match Chris Masters proceeded to put Wilson in a Masterlock until she was saved by Carlito. During this time, Ric Flair took an interest in Carlito, and Wilson accompanied the duo in a series of tag matches. On the March 12 episode of Raw, Wilson was defeated by then Women's Champion Melina, after the match Melina attacked Wilson but was stopped by Mickie James, who was then stopped by Victoria, Melina then attempted to escape but was stopped by Ashley Massaro. In May 2007, however, Carlito turned against Flair and dumped Wilson when he became a heel. For laughing at Vince McMahon, he decided to put her in a match teaming up with Carlito, in which she lost on the June 4, 2007, episode of Raw.

==== SmackDown and retirement (2007–2008) ====
The storyline came to a halt when on the June 11 episode of Raw, Wilson was drafted to the SmackDown! brand as part of the 2007 WWE Draft. As she returned, she acted as a valet for Jimmy Wang Yang and the duo was placed in feuds against Victoria and Kenny Dykstra.

At SummerSlam, Wilson participated in a number one contenders Battle Royal which was won by Beth Phoenix. On the September 21 episode of SmackDown!, Wilson was one of the bridesmaids at the Theodore Long – Kristal Marshall wedding. On the September 28 episode of SmackDown!, after losing to Victoria, she was attacked in the ring by the debuting villainess Krissy Vaine, but the feud was prematurely dropped when Vaine left the company. On the October 29 episode of Raw, Wilson competed in the Halloween Divas Battle Royal eliminating Victoria before being last eliminated by Kelly Kelly, who defeated her with a strike to the groin. On the November 16 episode of SmackDown!, Wilson teamed up with Mickie James in a losing effort to Phoenix and Victoria. She was on James's team at Survivor Series, which was victorious over Phoenix's. Wilson's last on-screen appearance was during the November 23 episode of SmackDown!, defeating long-time rival Victoria. In November, Wilson took time off from wrestling to undergo physical therapy in relation to a previous back injury. Torrie then made several final appearances as part of the company in February 2008, for autograph signings during the WrestleMania Fan Axxess tour – such as February 9 and 11. Following this, she took more time off. On May 8, 2008, Wilson was released from her WWE contract and she subsequently retired.

==== Sporadic appearances (2009, 2012, 2018) ====
Eleven months after her release, Wilson returned on April 5, 2009, at WrestleMania 25, competing on the 25-Diva Royal to crown Miss WrestleMania, which was won by Santina Marella. Wilson was shown in the audience at WrestleMania XXVIII with her then-boyfriend, Alex Rodriguez, of the New York Yankees.

On the January 22, 2018, episode of Raw, Wilson was honored being "one of the greatest female superstars in the history of WWE" and made a special appearance as part of the 25th anniversary of Raw along with fellow wrestlers and former co-workers; The Bella Twins, Maryse, Kelly Kelly, Lilian Garcia, Michelle McCool, Terri Runnels, Maria Kanellis, and fellow Hall of Famers Trish Stratus and Jacqueline. On January 28 at Royal Rumble, Wilson made a surprise entrance at number 9 during the first women's Royal Rumble match, in which she eliminated Dana Brooke before ultimately being eliminated by Sonya Deville. On October, 28, Wilson took part on a Battle Royal during the first all-women's pay–per–view, in which the winner would receive a future WWE Women's Championship match, but was unsuccessful as she was eliminated by Mandy Rose.

==== Hall of Fame and sporadic appearances (2019–present) ====
On March 4, 2019, it was announced that Wilson would be inducted into the WWE Hall of Fame class of 2019. At the ceremony on April 6, she was inducted by Stacy Keibler. The next night at WrestleMania 35, she appeared during intermission while she was introduced as part of the 2019 Hall of Fame class. She made another appearance during the Raw Reunion on July 22, 2019, and on Raw Legends night on January 4, 2021, where she appeared in backstage segments.

On January 31, 2021, Wilson participated in the Royal Rumble at the women's Royal Rumble match being the 17th entrant and the only Hall of Famer in the match. Ultimately, she was eliminated by Shayna Baszler. Later in April, WWE Network listed her as one of the many female performers who made an impact in WWE outside the ring.

On March 31, 2023, Wilson inducted Stacy Keibler into the WWE Hall of Fame class of 2023.

In April 2024, Wilson appeared at the 2024 WWE Draft alongside Michelle McCool to announce the 2nd-round draft picks.

== Other media ==
Wilson has appeared in ten WWE video games. She first appeared in WWE SmackDown! Shut Your Mouth, followed by WWE WrestleMania XIX, WWE Raw 2, WWE SmackDown! Here Comes the Pain, WWE SmackDown! vs. Raw, WWE Day of Reckoning 2, WWE SmackDown! vs. Raw 2006, WWE SmackDown vs. Raw 2007, WWE SmackDown vs. Raw 2008 and WWE 2K26. In addition to WWE licensed games, she also appears in WCW Backstage Assault.

Aside from Playboy, Wilson is considered to be a sex symbol and has also appeared on the cover of several other magazines, including the September 2006 cover of FHM magazine.

Wilson was also number 43 on FHM's 100 Sexiest Women in the World list in 2007. She has also been on AskMen.com's list of the Most Desirable Women in the World twice: she was number 22 in 2006 and number 65 in 2007.

Wilson, along with several other Divas, filmed Timbaland's music video "Throw It on Me" in April 2007. Also in 2007, Wilson made a special appearance, along with Mick Foley, at the Special Olympics World Games in Shanghai. She appeared on the February 6, 2008, episode of Project Runway, where the contestants designed wrestling attire for several of the Divas.

In April 2009, Wilson signed on to appear on the NBC reality show, I'm a Celebrity...Get Me out of Here!, which premiered in June. On the show's season finale, Wilson was named the runner-up to winner Lou Diamond Phillips.

In September 2011, Wilson along with Candice Michelle filmed Lilian Garcia's music video "U Drive Me Loca".

On August 31, 2022, Wilson signed with Clubhouse Media, an influencer-based social media firm and digital talent management agency.

== Personal life ==
Wilson says she did not watch wrestling when she was younger, but says that since becoming involved in the industry, she has become a fan of Hulk Hogan. While working for WWE, Wilson was on the road up to 300 days per year. She had a Maltese dog named Chloe, who traveled with her. While on the road, Wilson worked out at least four days a week. Usually, her workout consisted of an hour of cardiovascular workouts and a half-hour of lifting weights. Wilson also has a close friendship with Stacy Keibler. At one point, they were roommates in Los Angeles, California.

After dating for four years, Wilson married Peter Gruner, known on-screen as Billy Kidman, on July 11, 2003. They lived in Tampa, Florida when not traveling. The couple divorced in 2008.

In September 2007, Wilson launched her clothing line, "Officially Jaded", alongside Nick Mitchell, a former WWE wrestler who was known as "Mitch" of the Spirit Squad. The couple began dating in mid-2006 while she was still married to Billy Kidman. She opened a store in The Woodlands, Texas, at the upscale Market Street district. On September 14, 2008, Torrie made an appearance at the inaugural Wrestler's Rescue event held in Piscataway, New Jersey, an event to create awareness and to help raise money to support the health care needs of retired professional wrestlers.

Wilson dated New York Yankees third baseman Alex Rodriguez from 2011 to 2014. Wilson married Justin Tupper on September 19, 2019. The couple announced the birth of their daughter, Poppi Wilson Tupper, in November 2025, born through a surrogate mother months prior.

After retiring from wrestling, she became a web-based fitness instructor and blogger.

Wilson's father, Al Wilson, died on April 4, 2019, two days before she was inducted into the WWE Hall of Fame.

== Professional wrestling style and persona ==
Wilson's wrestling style was extremely technical, which included an arsenal of moves like dropkicks, clotheslines, suplexes, and pinning moves. Among her finishing and signature moves included the Nose Job which was a sitout facebuster, the swinging neckbreaker, DDT variations, a handspring back elbow (dubbed springboard elbow) and the stink face.

Her gimmick was that of the all-American glamorous and sexy girl next door who sometimes carried her female dog Chloe with her during matches. She was cited by WWE as being "one of the most desired Divas during her seven years with WWE. And while she never held the WWE Women's Championship, the former Miss Galaxy winner can lay claim to performing in one of the most downloaded matches in WWE.com history: a Bikini Contest against Sable from Judgment Day in 2003."

In an interview with Chris Van Vliet which aired on the February 1, 2024 episode of Insight with Chris Van Vliet, Wilson revealed that she actually hated doing sexualized segments while in the WWE, describing the numerous bikini contests she engaged in as "mortifying." Wilson would again express her dislike of her sexualized WWE segments in an interview with Ariel Helwani which aired on the September 17, 2025 episode of The Ariel Helwani Show, even describing her renowned 2003 WWE Judgement Day bikini contest with Sable as being "like that nightmare where you wake up in the middle of the night and you’re at school naked.”

== Filmography ==
Film
Year	Title	Role	Notes
2016	Precious Cargo	Vanessa	
2016	Marauders	Miranda	

Television
Year	Title	Role	Notes
1999	Baywatch	Galaxy Girl Competitor	Season 9, episode 21
2000	WCW Thunder	Torrie Wilson	8 episodes
1999–2000	WCW Monday Nitro	Torrie Wilson / Samantha	48 episodes
2002	WWE Confidential	Torrie Wilson	1 episode
2001–2007	WWE SmackDown	Torrie Wilson	79 episodes
2007	Project Runway	Herself	Season 4, episode 4
2008	Project Runway	Herself	Season 4, episodes 7 and 10
2009	I'm a Celebrity...Get Me out of Here!	Herself	Second place
2001–2021	WWE Raw	Torrie Wilson	103 episodes

Video Game
Year	Title	Notes
2000	WCW Backstage Assault	First video game appearance
2002	WWE SmackDown! Shut Your Mouth	First WWE video game appearance
2003	WWE WrestleMania XIX	
2003	WWE Raw 2	
2003	WWE SmackDown! Here Comes the Pain	Cover athlete
2004	WWE SmackDown! vs. Raw	
2005	WWE Day of Reckoning 2	
2005	WWE SmackDown! vs. Raw 2006	
2006	WWE SmackDown! vs. Raw 2007	Cover athlete (North American version)
2007	WWE SmackDown! vs. Raw 2008	
2014	WWE SuperCard	Introduced in Season 9
2017	WWE Champions	Introduced in 2023
2026	WWE 2K26	Downloadable content (Ringside Pass Season 3)

Music Video
Year	Music video	Role	Notes
2007	Throw It on Me	Herself	
2011	U Drive Me Loca	Herself	

== Championships and accomplishments ==
=== Fitness and figure competition ===
- Women's Tri-Fitness
  - Miss Galaxy (1998)
  - Tri-Fitness Grace and Physique champion (1998)
  - Tri-Fitness Hall of Fame (2012)

=== Professional wrestling ===
- WWE
  - WWE Hall of Fame (Class of 2019)
