= WWE Women's Championship (1956–2010) =

Former women's professional wrestling world championship

- The final belt design of the original WWE Women's Championship. (2002–2010)

Details
- Promotion: National Wrestling Alliance (1950–1984); World Wrestling Entertainment (1984–2010)
- Date established: September 18, 1956
- Date retired: September 19, 2010 (unified with the WWE Divas Championship)

Other names
- NWA World Women's Championship (1950–1984); WWF Ladies’ Championship (1984–1990); WWF Women’s Championship (1990-2002); WWE Women's Championship (2002–2010); Unified WWE Divas’ Championship (2010)
Statistics
- First champion: The Fabulous Moolah (Note: The Fabulous Moolah technically became the inaugural WWF Women's Champion in 1984, but as per WWE's official title history, she became the inaugural champion in 1956 when she first won the NWA World Women's Championship.)
- Final champion: Layla
- Most reigns: Trish Stratus (7 reigns) (Note: The Fabulous Moolah is technically tied for the most reigns at seven, but WWE does not recognize any of the title changes from 1956 until 1984. As officially recognized by WWE, Moolah only has four reigns and Stratus has the most reigns at seven.)
- Longest reign: The Fabulous Moolah (1st reign, 3,651 days) (Note: As per WWE's official title history. The Fabulous Moolah's real consecutive number of days as champion for her first reign is 3,651 days. Moolah first lost the championship in 1966, but WWE does not recognize any of the title changes from 1956 until 1984. Her third reign of 3,841 days, which WWE includes as part of the continuous 10,170-day first reign, is still the longest reign.)
- Shortest reign: Mickie James (3rd reign, <1 hour)
- Oldest champion: The Fabulous Moolah (76 years, 87 days)
- Youngest champion: Stephanie McMahon-Helmlsey (23 years, 186 days)

The 1956 to 2010 version of the WWE Women's Championship was a women's professional wrestling world championship in World Wrestling Entertainment (WWE). The company claims a lineage that dates back to September 18, 1956, when The Fabulous Moolah became the third NWA World Women's Champion, although it had only been a part of the WWE (then the World Wrestling Federation, or WWF) since 1984.

The World Wrestling Federation did not exist in its modern incarnation in 1956, but claim this year for the championship's establishment and do not recognize any title changes from when Moolah became champion until she lost it in 1984, prior to which Moolah sold the rights to the title to the WWF and it became the WWF Women's Championship. With the company claiming a lineage beginning in 1956, it made the Women's Championship the oldest active professional wrestling championship in WWE until its retirement in 2010 after it was unified with the WWE Divas Championship, which briefly became known as the Unified WWE Divas Championship. The final champion was Layla.

A new WWE Women's Championship was created in April 2016, and although both championships share the same name and the original is considered to be the predecessor, the new championship does not carry the lineage of the original. In September 2016, the newer title was renamed as Raw Women's Championship but reverted to WWE Women's Championship in June 2023.

== History ==
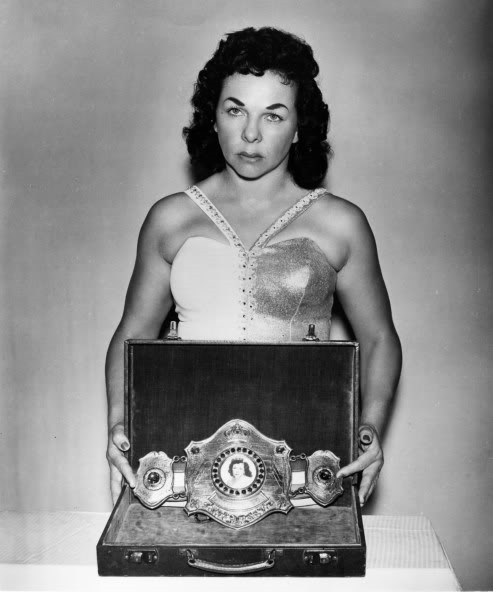
The Fabulous Moolah, the inaugural and longest reigning Women's Champion, recognized by WWE as holding the title for 28 years (1956–1984); she is shown here with the original championship belt

On September 18, 1956, The Fabulous Moolah became the third NWA World Women's Champion. At that time, WWE did not exist and would not become a company until 1963, when the Capitol Wrestling Corporation pulled out of the National Wrestling Alliance (NWA) to establish the World Wide Wrestling Federation (WWWF). Moolah, who bought the rights to the championship in the 1970s, defended the championship as the NWA World Women's Champion up until May 19, 1984; by this time, the WWWF had been renamed to World Wrestling Federation (WWF). In 1983, the WWF disaffiliated with the NWA and Moolah sold the championship's rights to the WWF in 1984, and she was recognized as the WWF Women's Champion. Instead of beginning her reign in 1984, the WWF claimed the lineage of her reign from when she first became champion in 1956. The preceding champions and the title changes between 1956 and when Moolah lost it in 1984 are not recognized by WWE (although they are recognized by the NWA). As a result, The Fabulous Moolah's first reign is considered to have lasted 28 years by the promotion.

In 1990, the Women's Championship became inactive after Rockin' Robin vacated the championship following her departure from the WWF. Then in December 1993, the title was reactivated with Alundra Blayze winning a tournament for the vacant Women's Championship. However, the Women's Championship became inactive again when Blayze was released from the WWF. Blayze, as Madusa, unexpectedly signed with World Championship Wrestling in 1995 and threw the championship belt, which was still in her possession, in a trash can on an episode of WCW Monday Nitro (in Blayze's 2015 WWE Hall of Fame speech, she "returned" the title). The Women's Championship was reactivated again in September 1998 during the Attitude Era when Jacqueline Moore defeated Sable to win the title.

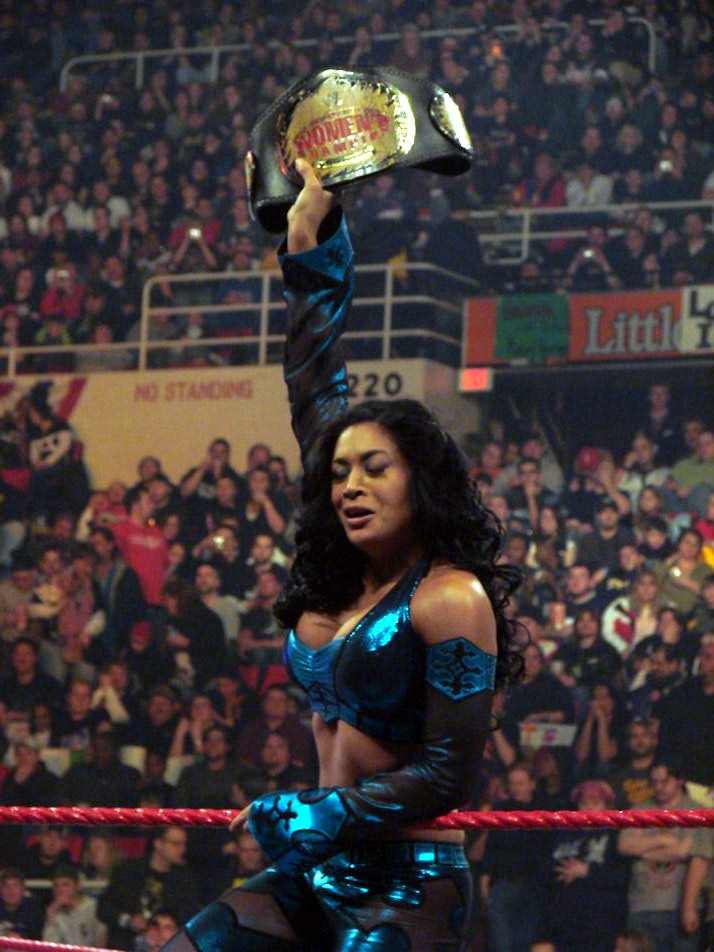
Melina in her third reign as Women's Champion after defeating Beth Phoenix for the title at the 2009 Royal Rumble

After the WWF/WWE name change in 2002, the championship was subsequently referred to as the WWE Women's Championship. With the WWE Brand Extension in March 2002, the Women's Championship at first was still defended on both the Raw and SmackDown brands, while most titles were exclusive to one brand. In September, the Women's Championship became exclusive to only the Raw brand. The Women's Championship remained the sole championship contested by women, until July 4, 2008, when a counterpart to the championship, called the WWE Divas Championship, was created for the SmackDown brand. On April 13, 2009, the Women's Championship became exclusive to the SmackDown brand when reigning champion Melina was drafted from Raw to SmackDown during the 2009 WWE Draft to replace the current WWE Divas Champion Maryse, who had been drafted to Raw.

The Women's Championship was unified with the Divas Championship at Night of Champions in September 2010, creating the Unified WWE Divas Championship and making the Women's Championship defunct as the unified title followed the lineage of the Divas Championship; the title eventually dropped the "Unified" moniker.

On April 3, 2016, at WrestleMania 32, a new WWE Women's Championship (called the Raw Women's Championship from September 2016 to June 2023) was introduced to succeed the Divas Championship. This new title does not carry the lineage of either the Divas Championship or the original Women's Championship, but is acknowledged by WWE as the successor of both.

== Tournaments ==
=== 1993 ===
This tournament was held to decide the new WWF Women's Champion after the title was reinstated after three years of inactivity.

Tournament bracket

1st Round; Wrestling Challenge; November 30, 1993
Heidi Lee Morgan	Pinfall
Black Venus	—
Rusty Thomas	Pinfall
Angie Marino	—

Semifinals; Superstars; December 1, 1993
Alundra Blayze	Pinfall
Allison Royal	—
Heidi Lee Morgan	Pinfall
Rusty Thomas	—

Final; All American Wrestling; December 13, 1993 (Aired: December 26)
Alundra Blayze	Pinfall
Heidi Lee Morgan	6:29

=== WWE Women's Championship Tournament (2006) ===
The WWE Women's Championship Tournament was a tournament to crown a new WWE Women's Champion after champion Trish Stratus retired from her wrestling career.

Tournament bracket

1st Round; Raw; September 25 – October 15, 2006 (Aired: October 16)
Lita	Pinfall (Note: Edge was the special guest referee.)
Candice Michelle	0:28
Maria	Win (Note: Maria vs. Candice Michelle vs. Victoria vs. Torrie Wilson in the 1st round was a Bra and Panties Match.)
Candice Michelle Torrie Wilson Victoria	1:14
Mickie James	Pinfall
Victoria	2:51
Melina	Pinfall (Note: Melina vs. Torrie Wilson in the 1st Round was a Lumberjill match.)
Torrie Wilson	2:43

Semifinals; Raw; October 23–30, 2006
Lita	Pinfall
Maria	2:19
Mickie James	Pinfall
Melina	4:00

Final; Cyber Sunday; November 5, 2006
Lita	Pinfall (Note: Lita vs. Mickie James in the Final was a Lumberjill match.)
Mickie James	8:09

== Brand designation history ==
Following the WWE brand extension on March 25, all titles in WWE became exclusive to either the Raw brand or SmackDown brand. The following is a list of dates indicating the transitions of the Women's Championship between the Raw and SmackDown brands.

Date of transition	Brand	Notes
September 18, 1956	N/A	When the title was first sold to WWE it did not belong to a brand.
September 23, 2002	Raw	The WWE Women's Championship became exclusive to Raw.
April 13, 2009	SmackDown	Women's Champion Melina was drafted to SmackDown in the 2009 WWE Draft.
September 19, 2010	—N/a	At Night of Champions, Michelle McCool unified the Divas Championship with the Women's Championship. The Women's Championship was retired and the Divas Championship became briefly known as the Unified WWE Divas Championship and defended on both Raw and SmackDown.

== Reigns ==
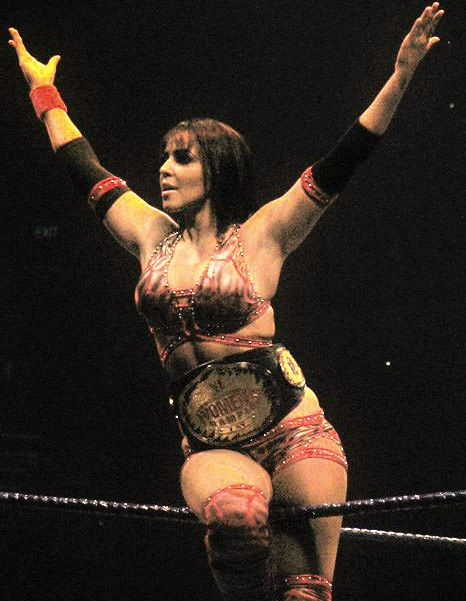
Layla was the final champion before the title was retired in 2010.

Over the championship's fifty-six year history, there were 59 recognized reigns between 29 recognized champions and 4 vacancies (there are 6 reigns and 3 people that are not recognized by the promotion). As per WWE's official title history, the inaugural champion was The Fabulous Moolah, who defeated Judy Grable on September 18, 1956. Moolah had the longest reign by holding it for 10 years, although the WWE considers it to be longer at 28 years, as title changes between 1956 and 1984 are not recognized by the promotion. The Fabulous Moolah is technically tied with Trish Stratus for the most reigns with 7, but because WWE does not recognize the title changes between 1956 and 1984, Moolah only has 4 and Stratus has the most reigns with 7. Mickie James's third reign is the shortest at less than 1 hour. Only four women held the championship for a continuous reign of one year (365 days) or more: The Fabulous Moolah (who achieved the feat on six occasions), Sensational Sherri, Rockin' Robin, and Trish Stratus.

Despite the title being contested mainly by female wrestlers, the championship was once held by a male, Harvey Wippleman, who won it under the name "Hervina".

Sporting positions
Preceded by NWA World Women's Championship	WWE's top women's championship 1984–2010	Succeeded by WWE Divas Championship
