= Candice Michelle =

American model, actress and professional wrestler (born 1978)

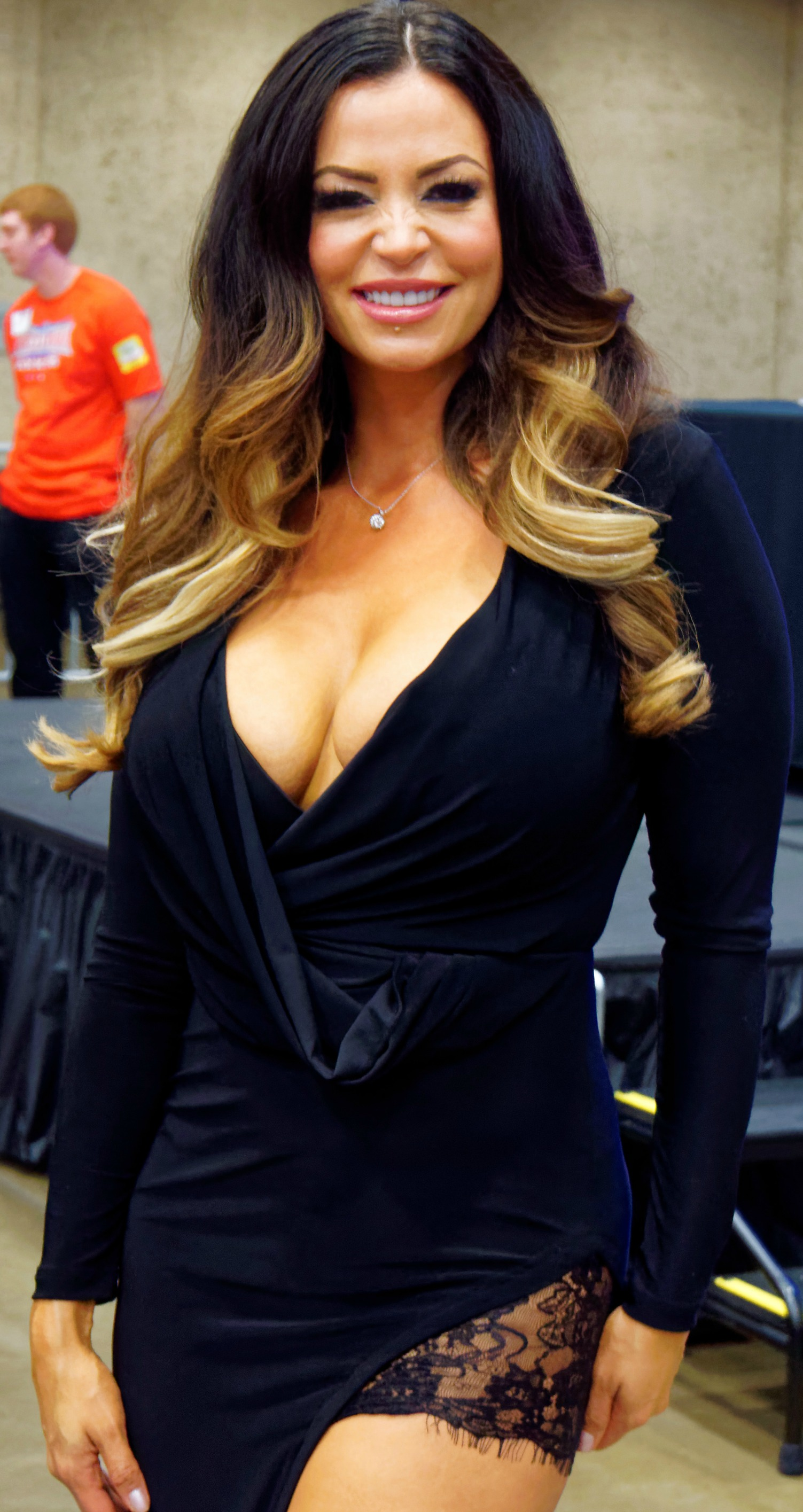
- Beckman in 2016

Personal information
- Born: Candice Michelle Beckman; September 30, 1978 (age 48) Milwaukee, Wisconsin, U.S.
- Education: Santa Monica College
- Spouse: Ken Ehrlich (m. 2005)
- Children: 3
- Website: candicemichelle.com

Professional wrestling career
- Ring name(s): Candice Michelle; Candice
- Billed height: 5 ft 7 in (170 cm)
- Billed weight: 120 lb (54 kg)
- Billed from: Milwaukee, Wisconsin
- Trained by: Dave Finlay; Arn Anderson; Trish Stratus; John Cena; CM Punk
- Debut: November 15, 2004
- Retired: December 2, 2017
- Occupations: Professional wrestler; model; actress
- Known for: Monday Night Raw; WWE Smackdown

Candice Michelle Beckman (born September 30, 1978), better known as Candice Michelle, is an American model, actress and retired professional wrestler. She is signed to Total Nonstop Action Wrestling (TNA) as a producer. She is best known for her tenure in World Wrestling Entertainment (WWE).

After five years of modeling and acting, Beckman was hired by WWE in 2004, after she participated in the WWE Diva Search. At Vengeance in 2007, she defeated Melina to win her first WWE Women's Championship and became the first former Diva Search contestant to win a WWE Championship. She was released from her WWE contract on June 19, 2009. Beckman made a special appearance on the WWE Raw Reunion episode on July 22, 2019, briefly winning the WWE 24/7 Championship, the second woman to have done so.

Beckman also posed in the April 2006 issue of Playboy, appearing on the cover.

== Early life ==
Beckman was born in Milwaukee, Wisconsin to Michael Beckman (1951–1980) and his wife, Kathleen (née Iwen; 1951–2002). Beckman is of German and Costa Rican descent. She played varsity and college basketball and has an interest in many sports. Candice is a Green Bay Packers fan.

== Modeling and acting career ==
Beckman won a modeling competition aged sixteen at her local skating rink. Around 1999, she moved to Los Angeles, California, to become a professional model and actress. She studied Theater Arts at Santa Monica College and had on-camera acting and Meisner technique training at The Piero Dusa Acting Studio. It was during this time that Beckman adopted her middle name Michelle as her working last name. Her first role was in the 2001 movie Tomcats. Beckman also made appearances on television programs such as Party of Five and 7th Heaven, as well as appearing in films Anger Management, Dodgeball: A True Underdog Story, and A Man Apart.

Beckman made her first appearances with Playboy in 2001, including an appearance on their Sexy Urban Legends TV series in the episode Spring Break Mistake. In June 2002, Beckman was named Cyber Girl of the Week in the June 2002 issue of Playboy, alongside an appearance later in the same year in Lowrider Magazine. On October 11, 2002, Candice starred in an episode of the softcore porn television series – Hotel Erotica that aired on Cinemax, playing a character called Natasha. From 2002 to 2004, Beckman starred in series of films as a fetish model under the alias of Mackenzie Montgomery.

GoDaddy Commercials

Beckman gained national attention in 2005 when she appeared in a commercial for internet domain provider GoDaddy, which aired during Super Bowl XXXIX. She played a character named "Nikki Cappelli" who had trouble with a snapped spaghetti strap on her tank top as she testified before a panel holding broadcast censorship hearings. The commercial was a parody of the 2004 "wardrobe malfunction" in which Janet Jackson's right breast was exposed. She then became widely known as "Miss GoDaddy.com" and the "GoDaddy Girl".

The following year, she was featured in several more GoDaddy commercials. During the 2006 NFC playoffs, she was featured cleaning windows. She later appeared in a commercial during Super Bowl XL, where she seduced an ABC executive to acquire an advertising slot for GoDaddy. She appeared in another commercial for Super Bowl XLI in 2007, where she danced in a room being doused with champagne. Beckman appeared on American Chopper to promote the commercial as well as GoDaddy's custom made chopper. In 2008, she was featured in her fourth consecutive GoDaddy commercial for Super Bowl XLII, entitled "White Light", but Fox refused to air it.

== Professional wrestling career ==
=== World Wrestling Entertainment (2004–2009) ===
==== Vince's Devils (2004–2006) ====
In July 2004, Beckman auditioned to be a contestant for World Wrestling Entertainment (WWE)'s Raw Diva Search. Despite not being chosen to be in the final ten, she was hired by the company under the gimmick of a makeup artist. She competed on Raw in several Diva contests, including lingerie fashion shows and limbo contests, until the end of the year.

On June 30, 2005, Candice was moved to SmackDown! where she became involved in a storyline between Torrie Wilson and Melina. On July 24, Candice made her pay-per-view debut at The Great American Bash where she served as the Special Guest Referee for the Bra and Panties match between Wilson and Melina. She was then moved back to Raw in a trade along with Wilson. According to Michelle, she was traded back to RAW since SmackDown was rated PG and her character didn't fit the rating. In her next storyline, Candice and Torrie became villains by taunting 2005 Diva Search winner Ashley Massaro, and they joined forces with fellow Raw Diva Victoria to form an alliance known as Ladies in Pink (later Vince's Devils). On the September 5 episode of Raw, Wilson defeated Massaro after the interference from Victoria and Candice. They continued feuding with Massaro until Trish Stratus returned from a legitimate injury to help Massaro "retaliate" against Vince's Devils. On the October 17 episode of Raw, where she, Torrie and Victoria faced off against the team of Stratus, Massaro, and their new ally Mickie James in a winning effort after Wilson pinned James. On November 28 episode of Raw, Candice teamed up with Victoria and Torrie Wilson in losing effort to Trish, Ashley and Mickie. In November, Candice signed on to pose for the April 2006 issue of Playboy. She had her first shot at the WWE Women's Championship in a Fulfill Your Fantasy Battle Royal at Taboo Tuesday but was eliminated from the match by Massaro. At the Tribute to The Troops on December 19, Michelle teamed up with Maria Kanellis in a winning effort defeating then Women's Champion Trish Stratus and Ashley Massaro in a divas-tag-team match after Candice pinned Ashley.

In January, Candice appeared at New Year's Revolution in the first ever Bra and Panties Gauntlet match, where she was eliminated by Maria. On the February 13 episode of Raw, Michelle accompanied Torrie in a losing effort to Ashley. After winning a number one contender's Diva battle royal on Raw, Candice got her first singles WWE Women's Championship match, but lost to then-champion Trish Stratus on February 27. After the match, Candice slapped Wilson, blaming her, in storyline, for the loss. Vince's Devils later broke up when Torrie became a fan favorite after Candice and Victoria turned on her during Candice's Playboy cover unveiling. This feud led to a match at WrestleMania 22 in which both Playboy cover girls competed in a Playboy Pillow Fight. Torrie Wilson won the match. On the June 12 episode of Raw, Candice was defeated by Torrie in the first ever "Wet and Wild match", a wrestling match involving water balloons and squirt guns, in which the winner of the match would be on the cover of the WWE 2006 Summer Special magazine. The feud continued sporadically in backstage segments where Candice was depicted as Vince McMahon's "sex slave". In a January 2021 interview with the Wrestling Inc. Daily, Candice described her on-screen romance angle with McMahon as being uncomfortable and "awkward," and in August 2023 also stated that she actually had no idea that McMahon would do things like grab her breasts before it happened. On the July 11 episode of ECW, the villainous Candice appeared as Kelly Kelly's dance partner on that night's Kelly's Exposé segment, and attempted to seduce Kelly in a backstage segment before the two divas went out to perform.

==== Singles competition and Women's Champion (2006–2007) ====
On the July 17 episode of Raw, Candice was the Special Guest Referee during a tag team match of Stratus and Wilson against Victoria and Mickie James. James entered the match without being tagged in, so Candice threw her out of the ring. Afterwards, Victoria tried to clothesline Candice, but she ducked out of the way, allowing Stratus to perform a Stratusfaction for the victory. As a result of her participation in the match, Candice became a fan favorite. On the Raw following Unforgiven, Candice won a match against Lita. The next week, in her second match against Lita, Candice was pinned after she was speared by guest referee Edge, in the first round of the WWE Women's Championship tournament. On the November 27 episode of Raw, during the Diva battle royal, Candice suffered a legitimate broken nose when Victoria kicked her in the face. She had surgery on November 30 to repair her deviated septum.

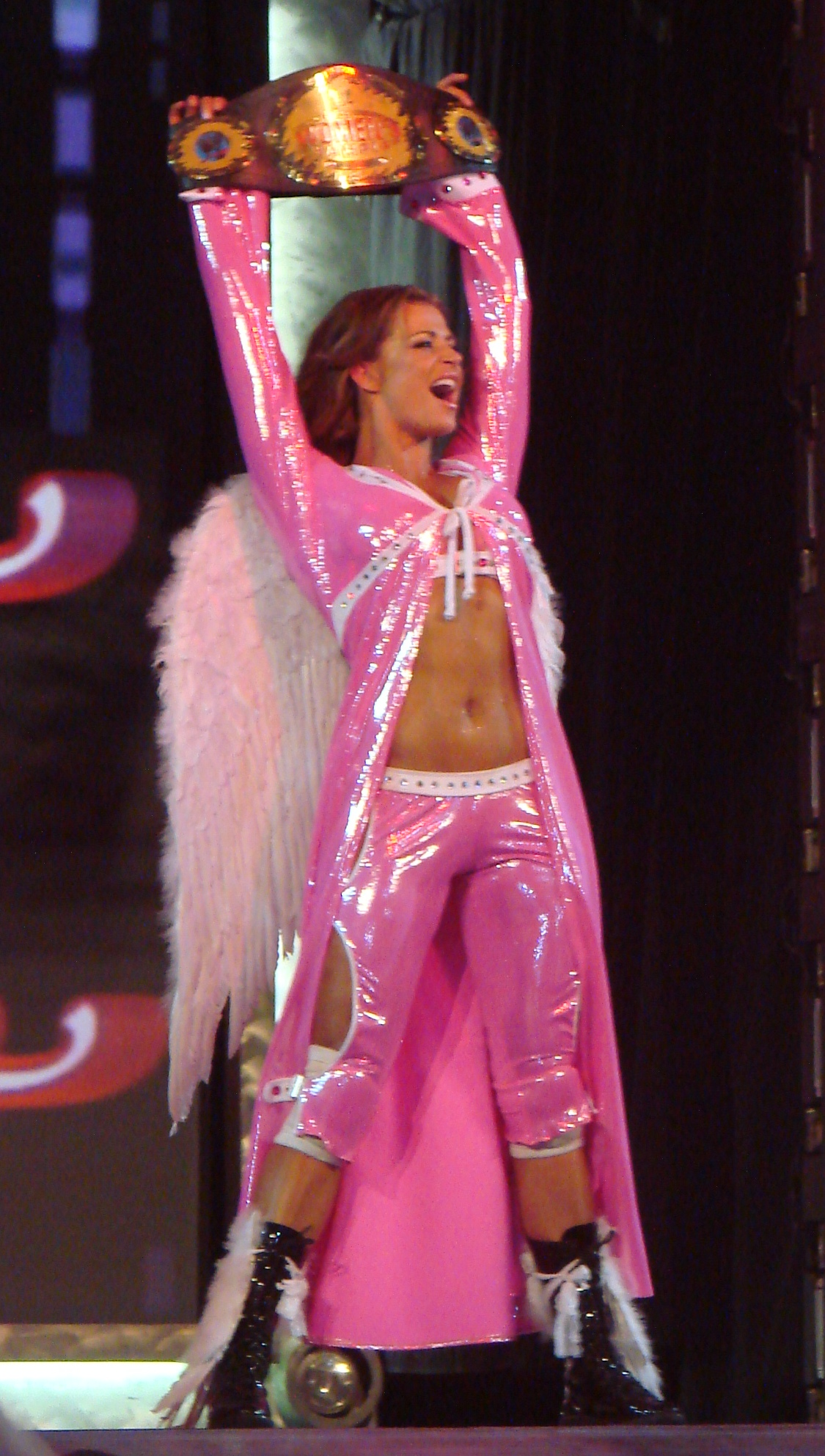
Candice as the WWE Women's Champion in 2007

Candice returned at New Year's Revolution on January 7, when she went to the ring with Maria to fight off Melina as she tried to interfere in the Women's Championship match between then-champion Mickie James and Victoria. Candice made her in-ring return on January 22 when she and Mickie James defeated Victoria and Melina in a tag team match with Candice scoring the pinfall. Candice then resumed her feud with Melina, who claimed in her blogs that no Playboy cover model was capable of defeating her in the ring. Candice took offense to this, which led to a Bra and Panties match between the two, which she lost. During this time, Candice began training on her off-days to improve her in-ring abilities. In the following weeks, Candice Michelle received increased television exposure and competed in higher-profile matches. She also achieved victories in tag team matches alongside Mickie James against Victoria and Melina. She also picked up several wins against the latter two in singles matches, which culminated at One Night Stand, where Candice defeated Melina in the first ever match held in a swimming pool full of pudding. Candice defeated Melina to capture her first WWE Women's Championship at Vengeance, becoming the first ever WWE Diva Search contestant to win the Women's Title. Candice retained her title against Melina in a rematch at The Great American Bash as well as debuting a new finisher called the Candywrapper.

Beth Phoenix became the number one contender for the Women's Title after winning a Diva battle royal at SummerSlam. At the Unforgiven pay-per-view, however, Candice successfully retained her title in their match by countering one of Phoenix's moves with a crucifix pin. Their feud continued when Phoenix pinned Candice during a non-title mixed tag team match on Raw on September 24. At No Mercy on October 7, Candice dropped the title to Phoenix, ending her reign as Women's Champion. On October 22, Candice legitimately cracked her clavicle during her rematch for the Women's Title against Phoenix in a two out of three falls match; Phoenix ran into the ropes, causing Candice to fall face-first off of the turnbuckle onto her face, neck, and shoulders necessitating a rushed finish and putting her out of action for 14 weeks.

==== Injuries and release (2008–2009) ====
Candice made her on-screen return on the February 18, 2008, episode of Raw, distracting Beth Phoenix during a match with Maria. She returned to in-ring action on March 17, teaming up with Maria to defeat Jillian Hall and Victoria. During the match, Candice injured her left shoulder by tearing the scar tissue over her previously broken left clavicle. Unlike her previous injury, Candice broke her clavicle in four separate places, in essence, shattering it. As a result, Candice was replaced by Ashley for her scheduled match at WrestleMania XXIV. On March 23, Candice underwent successful surgery on her re-broken clavicle.

On the September 1 episode of Raw, Candice made her in-ring return match teaming up with Kelly Kelly and Mickie James to defeat Jillian Hall, Katie Lea Burchill and Beth Phoenix, with Candice pinning Phoenix. Candice received a push upon her return as she was named the number one contender for the Women's Championship, but lost to Beth Phoenix at No Mercy. On November 23, 2008, Candice competed in 5 on 5 Survivor Series Elimination Match where her team went victorious. On the February 2 episode of RAW, Candice was defeated by Beth Phoenix after an interference by Mendes and Marella. On the February 16 episode of RAW, Candice, James and Kelly stopped Marella and Mendes from interfering in the Women's Championship match between Melina and Phoenix, which was won by Melina.

On April 15, 2009, Candice was drafted to the SmackDown brand as part of the 2009 Supplemental Draft. She, however, never reappeared on the brand and was released from her WWE contract on June 19, 2009.

=== Independent circuit (2017) ===
In October 2017, it was announced that Candice Michelle's retirement match would take place on December 2, at the House of Hardcore 36 – Blizzard Brawl show, where she defeated Lisa Marie Varon in singles action.

=== Sporadic appearances in WWE (2019, 2024) ===
On July 22, 2019, Candice returned to WWE during the Raw Reunion episode in a backstage segment with Melina, Naomi, and 24/7 Champion Kelly Kelly, who Candice congratulated for winning the title. After Melina revealed herself as a referee, Candice attacked Kelly, after which she pinned Kelly to become the new 24/7 Champion. Shortly after, Candice lost the title via submission to Alundra Blayze.

On August 12, 2024, Candice made a surprise cameo on an episode of Raw, as she was seen in the crowd during the women's tag team match.

=== Total Nonstop Action Wrestling (2026–present) ===
On January 15, 2026, Candice made a televised appearance for Total Nonstop Action Wrestling (TNA) on the TNA Impact! premiere on AMC as an audience member. On March 13, Candice signed with TNA as a producer.

== Other media ==
=== Video games ===
Year	Title	Role	Notes
2005	WWE SmackDown vs. Raw 2006	Candice Michelle	Voice
2006	WWE SmackDown vs. Raw 2007	Candice Michelle	
2007	WWE SmackDown vs. Raw 2008	Candice Michelle	
2008	WWE SmackDown vs. Raw 2009	Candice Michelle	Voice

=== Music videos ===
In December 2011, Candice Michelle along with Torrie Wilson filmed Lilian Garcia's music video "U Drive Me Loca".

=== Other appearances ===
During the week of November 5, 2007, Beckman appeared on five episodes of Family Feud with several other WWE performers. Beckman appeared on the February 6, 2008, episode of Project Runway, in an episode where the contestants were challenged to design wrestling attire for several of WWE's female wrestlers. Candice, along with Batista, Shelton Benjamin, and Josh Mathews, represented WWE at the 2008 Democratic National Convention in an effort to persuade fans to register to vote in the 2008 Presidential election. Beckman made a special appearance on the November 12, 2008, episode of Redemption Song, which is hosted by fellow WWE wrestler Chris Jericho, with several other WWE personalities. She also appeared alongside WWE performers in the February 2009 issue of Flex Magazine.

== Filmography ==
=== Film ===
Year	Title	Role	Notes
2001	Tomcats	Stripper (as Candice Beckman)	
2002	Roommated Wanted	Tammy Cartwright (as Candice Beckman)	Video
2002	Province 77	KC	
2004	Dodgeball: A True Underdog Story	Cheerleader (uncredited)	
2006	Living the Dream	Melissa	
2011	Horrorween	2nd Wife	Video

=== Television ===
Year	Title	Role	Notes
2001	Sexy Urban Legends	(Segment "Spring Break Mistake")	1 episode
2002	Hotel Erotica	Natasha	1 episode
2003	Monk	Sapphire Model (uncredited)	1 episode
2003–2004	Totally Busted	(series regular)	24 episodes
2004	Entourage	Party Girl (uncredited)	1 episode
2005	WWE Byte This!	Candice Michelle	2 episodes
2005	WWE SummerSlam	Candice Michelle	Pay-per-view
2006	WWE ECW	Candice Michelle	2 episodes
2006	Olvidarte jamás	Layla	1 episode
2007	WWE Heat	Candice Michelle	2 episodes
2007	WWE WrestleMania 23	Candice Michelle	Pay-per-view
2005–2008	WWE SmackDown	Candice Michelle	7 episodes
2008	Project Runway	Candice Michelle	1 episode
2009	WWE WrestleMania 25	Candice Michelle	TV Special
2016	Table for 3	Candice Michelle	1 episode
2004–2019	WWE Raw	Candice Michelle	Pay-per-view

== Personal life ==
On May 7, 2005, she married Ken Gee Ehrlich, a Los Angeles chiropractor. Together they have three daughters.

She has a tattoo of the word "faith" on her inner wrist, which she considers a "personal affirmation". It is also a reminder, in her words, to "believe in myself and have 'faith'". She got the tattoo, which was documented on the reality show LA Ink, after breaking her collarbone in 2007. The tattoo is also related to her Christian beliefs. When Candice made her return, she had new tattoos on her back, her new tattoos are of five stars, which starts at the lower part of her back then finished at the middle of her back.

== Championships and accomplishments ==
- Pro Wrestling Illustrated
  - Most Improved Wrestler of the Year (2007)
  - Ranked No. 10 of the top 50 female wrestlers in the PWI Female 50 in 2008
  - Woman of the Year (2007)
- World Wrestling Entertainment / WWE
  - WWE Women's Championship (1 time)
  - WWE 24/7 Championship (1 time)
- AskMen.com
  - No. 82 on "100 Most Desirable Women List" (July 2007).
