= List of WWE Women's Champions (1956–2010) =

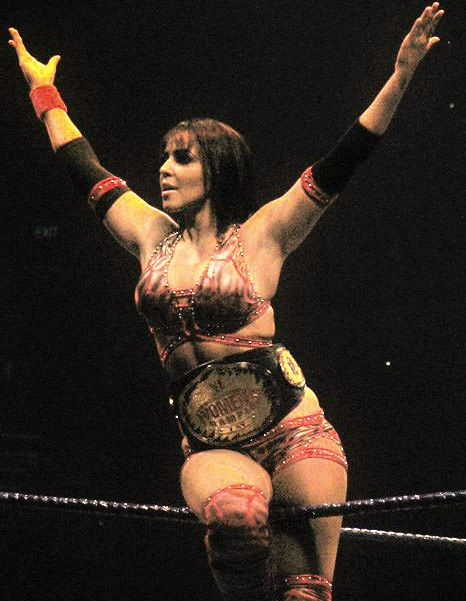
Layla was the final WWE Women's Champion

The WWE Women's Championship was a women's professional wrestling world championship in the World Wrestling Entertainment (WWE) promotion. The championship was generally contested in professional wrestling matches, in which participants execute scripted finishes rather than contend in direct competition. Over the championship's fifty-six year history, there were 59 recognized reigns between 29 recognized champions and 4 vacancies (there are 6 reigns and 3 people that are not recognized by the promotion). As recognized by WWE, the inaugural champion was The Fabulous Moolah, who won the title on September 18, 1956, which at that time was the NWA World Women's Championship (which still exists today). While she was still champion, it became the WWF Women's Championship in 1984.

In May 2002, after the WWF was renamed to WWE, the championship became the WWE Women's Championship. At the start of the brand extension that began in March 2002, the Women's Championship was defended on any brand until it became exclusive to Raw in September that year. It was the only women's championship in the WWE until SmackDown created the WWE Divas Championship as a counterpart title in July 2008. The titles switched brands in April 2009. On September 19, 2010, at Night of Champions, the Women's Championship was unified with the WWE Divas Championship, retiring the Women's Championship.

The Fabulous Moolah's first reign is the longest reign, and is officially recognized to be 10,129 days as part of her first reign, due to WWE not recognizing title changes between 1956 and 1984 (her first reign's real number is 3,651 days). Moolah technically also is tied with Trish Stratus for the most reigns at 7, but since WWE does not recognize the title changes between 1956 and 1984, Moolah only has 4 reigns. Mickie James' third reign is the shortest at less than 1 hour. The Fabulous Moolah is the oldest champion, having won the title at 76 years old, while Wendi Richter is the youngest champion, winning the title at the age of 22. The final champion was Layla, in her first and only reign.

Only four women held the championship for a continuous reign of one year (365 days) or more: The Fabulous Moolah (who achieved the feat on six occasions), Sensational Sherri, Rockin' Robin, and Trish Stratus.

== Reigns ==
=== Names ===
Name	Years
NWA World Women's Championship	September 18, 1956 – May 19, 1984
WWF Ladies’ Championship/WWF World Ladies’ Championship	May 19, 1984 – February 21, 1990
WWF Women’s Championship	December 13, 1993-May 6, 2002
WWE Women's Championship	May 6, 2002 – September 19, 2010
Unified WWE Divas’ Championship	September 19, 2010

=== Reigns ===
Key
No.	Overall reign number
Reign	Reign number for the specific champion
Days	Number of days held
Days recog.	Number of days held recognized by the promotion
N/A	Unknown information
†	Championship change is unrecognized by the promotion
<1	Reign lasted less than a day

No.	Champion	Championship change			Reign statistics			Notes	Ref.
No.	Champion	Date	Event	Location	Reign	Days	Days recog.	Notes	Ref.
National Wrestling Alliance (NWA)
1	The Fabulous Moolah	September 18, 1956	Live event	Baltimore, MD	1	3,651	10,170	WWE recognizes Moolah's reign as being uninterrupted until 1984. The title was known as the NWA World Women's Championship (which still exists today) until May 19, 1984, when Moolah sold the rights to the championship to the World Wrestling Federation (WWF, now WWE) and the title was renamed to WWF Ladies’ Championship.	
†	Bette Boucher	September 17, 1966	Live event	Seattle, WA	–	16	—		
†	The Fabulous Moolah	October 3, 1966	Live event	Vancouver, BC	–	524	—		
†	Yukiko Tomoe	March 10, 1968	Live event	Osaka, Japan	–	23	—		
†	The Fabulous Moolah	April 2, 1968	Live event	Hamamatsu, Japan	–	3,841	—		
†	Evelyn Stevens	October 8, 1978	Live event	Dallas, TX	–	2	—		
†	The Fabulous Moolah	October 10, 1978	Live event	Fort Worth, TX	–	2,113	—		
World Wrestling Federation (WWF)
2	Wendi Richter	July 23, 1984	The Brawl to End It All	New York, NY	1	210	209		
3	Leilani Kai	February 18, 1985	The War to Settle the Score	New York, NY	1	41	40	Aired March 5, 1985, on Prime Time Wrestling.	
4	Wendi Richter	March 31, 1985	WrestleMania I	New York, NY	2	239	238		
5	The Fabulous Moolah	November 25, 1985	Live event	New York, NY	2^{(5)}	220	219	Moolah was disguised as "The Spider Lady".	
6	Velvet McIntyre	July 3, 1986	Live event	Brisbane, Australia	1	6	5		
7	The Fabulous Moolah	July 9, 1986	Live event	Sydney, Australia	3^{(6)}	380	379		
8	Sensational Sherri	July 24, 1987	Live event	Houston, TX	1	441	440		
9	Rockin' Robin	October 7, 1988	Prime Time Wrestling	Paris, France	1	502	501	Aired November 8, 1988.	
—	Deactivated	February 21, 1990	—	—	—	—	—	The title was considered inactive after Rockin' Robin left the WWF.	
10	Alundra Blayze	December 13, 1993	All American Wrestling	Poughkeepsie, NY	1	342	348	Aired December 26, 1993. Defeated Heidi Lee Morgan in a tournament final to win the vacant championship. The title was reintroduced as the WWF Women’s Championship. WWE mistakenly recognizes Blayze's reign as lasting 348 days, ending on November 27, 1994.	
11	Bull Nakano	November 20, 1994	Big Egg Wrestling Universe	Tokyo, Japan	1	134	126	WWE mistakenly recognizes Nakano's reign as lasting 126 days, beginning on November 27, 1994.	
12	Alundra Blayze	April 3, 1995	Raw	Poughkeepsie, NY	2	146	145		
13	Bertha Faye	August 27, 1995	SummerSlam	Pittsburgh, PA	1	57	56		
14	Alundra Blayze	October 23, 1995	Raw	Brandon, MB	3	51	50		
—	Vacated	December 13, 1995	—	—	—	—	—	The title was vacated when Alundra Blayze left the WWF. Blayze then joined rival promotion World Championship Wrestling (WCW) and, during WCW Monday Nitro on December 18, 1995, dropped the title belt, which was still in her possession, in a trash can.	
15	Jacqueline	September 15, 1998	Raw is War	Sacramento, CA	1	61	54	Defeated Sable to win the vacant championship. WWE recognizes Jacqueline's reign as beginning on September 21, 1998, when the episode aired on tape delay.	
16	Sable	November 15, 1998	Survivor Series	St. Louis, MO	1	176	175	Shane McMahon was the special guest referee.	
17	Debra	May 10, 1999	Raw is War	Orlando, FL	1	29	34	This was an evening gown match. Sable had defeated Debra in the match, but Commissioner Shawn Michaels stated that Debra was the winner because she had lost her dress and awarded the championship to her. WWE recognizes her reign as ending on June 14, 1999, when the following episode aired on tape delay.	
18	Ivory	June 8, 1999	Raw is War	Worcester, MA	1	131	124	WWE recognizes Ivory's reign as ending on June 14, 1999, when the following episode aired on tape delay.	
19	The Fabulous Moolah	October 17, 1999	No Mercy	Cleveland, OH	4^{(7)}	8	7		
20	Ivory	October 25, 1999	Raw is War	Providence, RI	2	48	47		
21	The Kat	December 12, 1999	Armageddon	Sunrise, FL	1	50	49	This was a fatal four-way evening gown pool match, also involving Jacqueline and B.B., with The Fabulous Moolah and Mae Young as special guest referees.	
22	Hervina	January 31, 2000	Raw is War	Pittsburgh, PA	1	1	2	This was a lumberjill snowbunny match. Hervina was Harvey Wippleman disguised as a woman and was recognized as the first man to win the Women's Championship. WWE recognizes Hervina's reign as ending on February 3, 2000, when the following episode aired on tape delay.	
23	Jacqueline	February 1, 2000	SmackDown!	Detroit, MI	2	56	53	WWE recognizes Jacqueline's reign as beginning on February 3 and ending on March 30, 2000, when both episodes aired on tape delay.	
24	Stephanie McMahon-Helmsley	March 28, 2000	SmackDown!	San Antonio, TX	1	146	143	WWE recognizes McMahon's reign as beginning on March 30, 2000, when the episode aired on tape delay.	
25	Lita	August 21, 2000	Raw is War	Lafayette, LA	1	71	72	The Rock was the special guest referee. WWE recognizes Lita's reign as ending on November 2, 2000, when the episode aired on tape delay.	
26	Ivory	October 31, 2000	SmackDown!	Rochester, NY	3	152	149	This was a fatal four-way match, also involving Jacqueline and Trish Stratus. WWE recognizes Ivory's reign as beginning on November 2, 2000, when the episode aired on tape delay.	
27	Chyna	April 1, 2001	WrestleMania X-Seven	Houston, TX	1	214	231	WWE mistakenly lists Chyna's reign as lasting 231 days, ending on November 18, 2001.	
—	Vacated	November 1, 2001	—	—	—	—	—	The title was vacated when Chyna retired and left the WWF in a contract dispute.	
28	Trish Stratus	November 18, 2001	Survivor Series	Greensboro, NC	1	78	77	This was a six-pack challenge for the vacant championship, also involving Ivory, Jacqueline, Jazz, Lita, and Molly Holly.	
29	Jazz	February 4, 2002	Raw	Las Vegas, NV	1	98	97	In late March 2002, due to the roster having doubled in size, the brand extension began, splitting the roster between the Raw and SmackDown brands, represented by the TV shows of the same name. Championships were assigned to be exclusive to a specific brand, with the exception of the Undisputed Championship and the Women's Championship, which were non-exclusive at this time. After the WWF was renamed World Wrestling Entertainment (WWE) due to a lawsuit by the World Wide Fund for Nature on May 6, 2002, the title was renamed to WWE Women's Championship.	
WWE
30	Trish Stratus	May 13, 2002	Raw	Toronto, ON, Canada	2	41	40	This was a hardcore mixed tag team match with Stratus and Bubba Ray Dudley defeating Jazz and Steven Richards, with Richards' Hardcore Championship also on the line.	
31	Molly Holly	June 23, 2002	King of the Ring	Columbus, OH	1	91	90		
32	Trish Stratus	September 22, 2002	Unforgiven	Los Angeles, CA	3	56	55	On the September 26, 2002, episode of SmackDown!, SmackDown! General Manager Stephanie McMahon revealed that the Women's Championship had been made exclusive to Raw.	
WWE: Raw
33	Victoria	November 17, 2002	Survivor Series	New York, NY	1	133	132	This was a hardcore match.	
34	Trish Stratus	March 30, 2003	WrestleMania XIX	Seattle, WA	4	28	27	This was a triple threat match also involving Jazz.	
35	Jazz	April 27, 2003	Backlash	Worcester, MA	2	64	63		
36	Gail Kim	June 30, 2003	Raw	Buffalo, NY	1	28	27	This was a seven-woman battle royal, also involving Ivory, Jacqueline, Molly Holly, Trish Stratus, and Victoria.	
37	Molly Holly	July 28, 2003	Raw	Colorado Springs, CO	2	210	209		
38	Victoria	February 23, 2004	Raw	Omaha, NE	2	111	110	This was a fatal four-way elimination match, also involving Jazz and Lita, who Victoria lastly pinned.	
39	Trish Stratus	June 13, 2004	Bad Blood	Columbus, OH	5	176	175	This was a fatal four-way match also involving Gail Kim and Lita, who Stratus pinned.	
40	Lita	December 6, 2004	Raw	Charlotte, NC	2	34	33		
41	Trish Stratus	January 9, 2005	New Year's Revolution	San Juan, Puerto Rico	6	448	447		
42	Mickie James	April 2, 2006	WrestleMania 22	Rosemont, IL	1	134	133		
43	Lita	August 14, 2006	Raw	Charlottesville, VA	3	34	33		
44	Trish Stratus	September 17, 2006	Unforgiven	Toronto, ON, Canada	7	1	<1		
—	Vacated	September 18, 2006	Raw	Montreal, QC, Canada	—	—	—	Trish Stratus relinquished the title due to her retirement.	
45	Lita	November 5, 2006	Cyber Sunday	Cincinnati, OH	4	21	20	Defeated Mickie James in a lumberjill match, which was also a tournament final for the vacant championship.	
46	Mickie James	November 26, 2006	Survivor Series	Philadelphia, Pennsylvania, U.S.	2	85	84		
47	Melina	February 19, 2007	Raw	Bakersfield, CA	1	64	63		
48	Mickie James	April 24, 2007	Live event	Paris, France	3	<1	<1	This was a triple threat match also involving Victoria, who James pinned. This was a legitimate unplanned finish, as in reality, Melina was supposed to retain the title, but during a pin, Victoria did not get her shoulder up in time and the referee counted the pinfall.	
49	Melina	April 24, 2007	Live event	Paris, France	2	61	60		
50	Candice Michelle	June 24, 2007	Vengeance: Night of Champions	Houston, TX	1	105	104		
51	Beth Phoenix	October 7, 2007	No Mercy	Rosemont, IL	1	190	189		
52	Mickie James	April 14, 2008	Raw	London, England	4	125	124	On July 20, 2008, SmackDown General Manager Vickie Guerrero established the WWE Divas Championship as the counterpart to Raw's Women's Championship.	
53	Beth Phoenix	August 17, 2008	SummerSlam	Indianapolis, IN	2	161	160	This was a Winner Takes All Intergender tag team match where Phoenix and Santino Marella faced Mickie James and Kofi Kingston, whose Intercontinental Championship was also on the line.	
54	Melina	January 25, 2009	Royal Rumble	Detroit, MI	3	154	153	The title became exclusive to SmackDown following the 2009 WWE draft.	
WWE: SmackDown
55	Michelle McCool	June 28, 2009	The Bash	Sacramento, CA	1	217	216		
56	Mickie James	January 31, 2010	Royal Rumble	Atlanta, GA	5	23	25	WWE recognizes James' reign as ending on February 26, 2010, when the following episode aired on tape delay.	
57	Michelle McCool	February 23, 2010	SmackDown	Milwaukee, WI	2	61	57	Vickie Guerrero was the special guest referee. WWE recognizes McCool's reign as beginning on February 26, 2010, when the episode aired on tape delay.	
58	Beth Phoenix	April 25, 2010	Extreme Rules	Baltimore, MD	3	16	18	This was an Extreme Makeover match. WWE recognizes Phoenix's reign as ending on May 14, 2010, when the following episode aired on tape delay.	
59	Layla	May 11, 2010	SmackDown	Buffalo, NY	1	131	127	This was a Texas Tornado 2-on-1 Handicap match where Michelle McCool teamed with Layla. McCool was unofficially the co-champion during this reign; she defended the championship in Layla's place on some occasions, but was not officially recognized as the title holder. WWE recognizes Layla's reign as beginning on May 14, 2010, when the episode aired on tape delay.	
—	Unified	September 19, 2010	Night of Champions	Rosemont, IL	—	—	—	Michelle McCool, who had been unofficially co-reigning with Layla, defeated Melina to unify the Women's Championship into the WWE Divas Championship. The Women's Championship was retired with McCool going forward as the unified Divas Champion.	

== Combined reigns ==
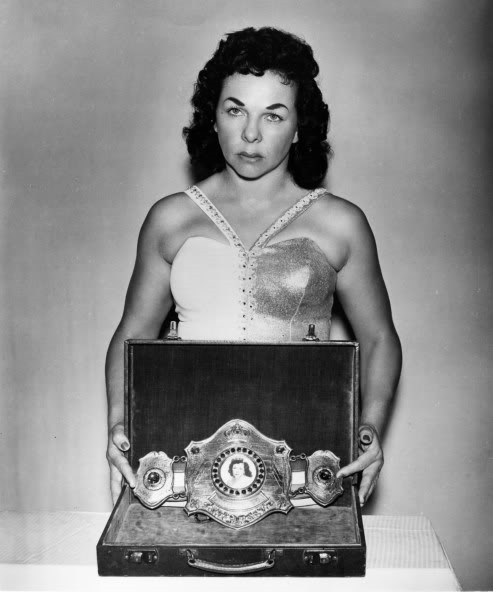
The Fabulous Moolah was the inaugural, seven-time, oldest champion, with most combined days and longest reign in the title history

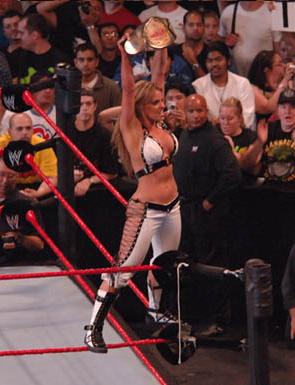
Trish Stratus after winning her seventh title, the most of any Women's Champion under the WWE banner

Rank	Champion	No. of reigns	Combined days	Combined days recognized by WWE
1	The Fabulous Moolah	4	10,770	10,775
2	Trish Stratus	7	825	835
3	Alundra Blayze	3	538	543
4	Rockin' Robin	1	502	501
5	Wendi Richter	2	448	447
6	Sensational Sherri	1	441	440
7	Mickie James	5	367	366
7	Beth Phoenix	3	367	
9	Ivory	3	331	320
10	Molly Holly	2	301	299
11	Melina	3	279	284
12	Michelle McCool	2	275	280
13	Victoria	2	244	243
14	Chyna	1	226	231
15	Sable	1	176	175
16	Jazz	2	162	160
17	Lita	4	160	158
18	Stephanie McMahon-Helmsley	1	146	143
19	Bull Nakano	1	134	126
20	Layla	1	132	127
21	Jacqueline	2	117	107
22	Candice Michelle	1	105	104
23	Bertha Faye	1	57	56
24	The Kat	1	50	49
25	Leilani Kai	1	41	40
26	Debra	1	29	34
27	Gail Kim	1	28	27
—	Yukiko Tomoe	—	23	—
—	Bette Boucher	—	16	—
28	Velvet McIntyre	1	6	5
—	Evelyn Stevens	—	2	—
29	Hervina/Harvey Wippleman	1	1	2
