= Lisa Marie Varon =

American wrestler, fitness competitor, and bodybuilder (born 1971)

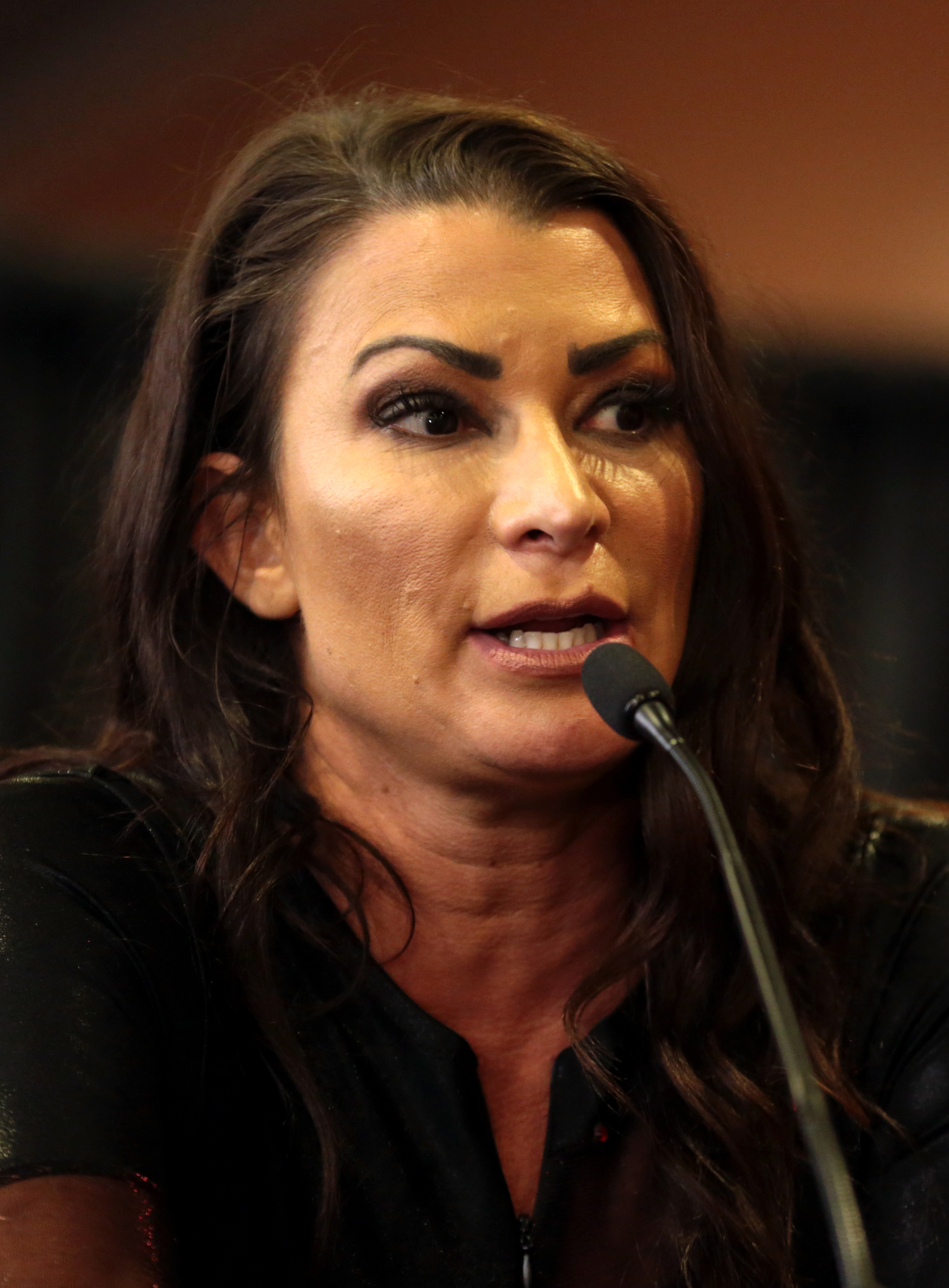
- Varon in 2017

Personal information
- Born: Lisa Marie Sole; February 10, 1971 (age 55) San Bernardino, California, U.S.
- Spouse: Lee Varon (m. 1994; div. 2015)

Professional wrestling career
- Ring name(s): Head Bitch in Charge; Queen "Tara" Victoria; Tara; Victoria; Lisa Marie Varon
- Billed height: 5 ft 8 in (173 cm)
- Billed weight: 137 lb (62 kg)
- Billed from: Los Angeles, California; Chicago, Illinois
- Trained by: Ultimate Pro Wrestling; Power Pro Wrestling; Memphis Championship Wrestling; Heartland Wrestling Association; Ohio Valley Wrestling; Dave Finlay
- Debut: 2000
- Retired: 2026

Lisa Marie Varon (née Sole; born February 10, 1971) is a retired American professional wrestler, fitness competitor and bodybuilder. She is signed to WWE under a legends contract, having competed for the promotion under the ring name Victoria. She is also known for her tenure in Total Nonstop Action Wrestling (TNA), under the ring name Tara. Varon held both companies women's championships on many occasions.

Varon began competing in fitness competitions and won ESPN2's Fitness America Series in 1997. In 1999, she placed second at a fitness event in New York City to earn her International Federation of BodyBuilders (IFBB) Professional Fitness Card. Varon met World Wrestling Federation (WWF) performer Chyna, who encouraged her to become a professional wrestler. She trained in the WWF's developmental territories for three years before moving to the main roster to compete full-time under the ring name Victoria.

Varon had her first television appearance at WrestleMania 2000, where she portrayed one of The Godfather's "Hos". She debuted in June 2002 and was pushed to win the WWE Women's Championship, a title she would go on to hold twice in her wrestling career. After leaving WWE in 2009, Varon debuted in TNA later that year as Tara. In TNA, she became a five-time TNA Knockouts Champion, making her a seven-time Women's Champion overall. She was also a one-time TNA Knockouts Tag Team Champion, with Brooke Tessmacher, collectively known as TnT.

== Early life ==
Varon was born in San Bernardino, California, to a Puerto Rican father (who is a Vietnam veteran) and a Korean-born Tatar mother who worked as a singer in Japan. She grew up with three older brothers, all of whom became amateur wrestlers, with her oldest brother, Bobby, winning a gold medal at the 1983 Pan American Games. Varon attended Eisenhower High School in Rialto, California. During high school, she was active in cheerleading, a sport in which she competed since the sixth grade.

During her senior year in high school, she was nationally recognized by the National Cheerleading Association, earning an All-American award and being chosen to cheer at half-time of the NFL 1989 Pro Bowl, alongside 70 other women. She participated in track and field events in the ninth grade. After graduating, she studied biology at the University of California, Los Angeles and she studied medicine at Loma Linda University, with the intent on becoming a physician. She worked as a human tissue coordinator at the Inland Eye and Tissue Bank in Redlands, California, where she was involved in the process of organ donation.

== Bodybuilding and fitness career ==
While working at the eye and tissue bank, Varon became a personal trainer and taught aerobics. While training at a gym, she was offered an opportunity to compete in a bodybuilding competition, a contest she won as a middleweight. She competed in fitness competitions, such as ESPN2's Fitness America Series in 1997 and 1998, winning the former, and the Miss Galaxy Competition in 1998, where she met and befriended Torrie Wilson. After Wilson moved to Los Angeles, California and signed with the professional wrestling promotion World Championship Wrestling (WCW), she invited Varon to one of the shows. While backstage, an agent asked her to appear in a segment with Scott Hall. Through Wilson, Varon unsuccessfully attempted to obtain a contract with WCW. She later moved to Los Angeles to find work in televised news fitness segments. In 1999, she earned her International Federation of BodyBuilders (IFBB) Professional Fitness Card after placing second at the National Physique Committee (NPC) Team Universe show in New York City. It was during her time working in fitness competitions that Varon also first met Trish Stratus.

== Professional wrestling career ==
=== World Wrestling Federation/Entertainment (2000–2009) ===
==== Training and debut (2000–2002) ====
After moving to Los Angeles, Varon worked as a trainer at the gym Crunch Fitness, where she met World Wrestling Federation wrestler Chyna, who complimented Varon on her appearance and encouraged her to become a wrestler. Varon would then put together a biography package and sent it to the WWF. She heard from Kevin Kelly two days later, who invited her to an interview in a month's time. With no previous wrestling experience, she looked up professional wrestling schools, and eventually began training at Ultimate Pro Wrestling (UPW) in Southern California in June 2000. She wrestled under the ring name Head Bitch In Charge (HBIC), and appeared in a cheerleading outfit, with a snooty gimmick, similar to WCW Nitro Girl Miss Hancock. She impressed WWF talent scout Bruce Prichard during her first UPW show.

Varon made her on-screen debut in the WWF portraying one of The Godfather's "hos". She was referred to as the "head ho", and led the "Save the Hos" campaign. On the August 7 episode of Raw Is War, Varon took a bump by being powerbombed through a table by The Godfather's next persona, The Goodfather. After this, she was given the name Victoria. She was removed from television in November, and sent to WWF's then-developmental territory Power Pro Wrestling in Memphis for extensive training. In February 2001, she was aligned with Brandon Baxter and Bobby Eaton in a feud with Bill Dundee, Jerry Lawler and The Kat. Throughout the feud, Victoria and Baxter were manipulating Eaton into fighting with Dundee, going so far as blurring fact and fiction by mixing professional and personal lives, including having Bobby's son Dylan call on the phone and a kayfabe wedding between Victoria and Eaton. Unfortunately, the feud didn't have a proper end, as in March 2001, the WWF severed ties with Power Pro over Jerry Lawler's quitting the promotion over the Kat's firing in late February. Power Pro folded shortly thereafter.

After Power Pro folded, she quickly joined Memphis Championship Wrestling (MCW). Victoria briefly acted as the commissioner for MCW, and was involved in storyline feud with Ivory. She also managed Steve Bradley before MCW closed in 2001. Varon later relocated to Louisville, Kentucky to train in Ohio Valley Wrestling (OVW), using the ring name Queen Victoria. She was placed as the manager of the tag team the Basham Brothers, and managed one of the team members, Doug Basham, to win the OVW Heavyweight Championship on July 25, 2001.

Victoria lost to Lita at the Brian Pillman Memorial Show on August 4, 2001, as part of Heartland Wrestling Association. She worked for Heartland until early 2002.

==== Women's Championship reigns (2002–2004) ====
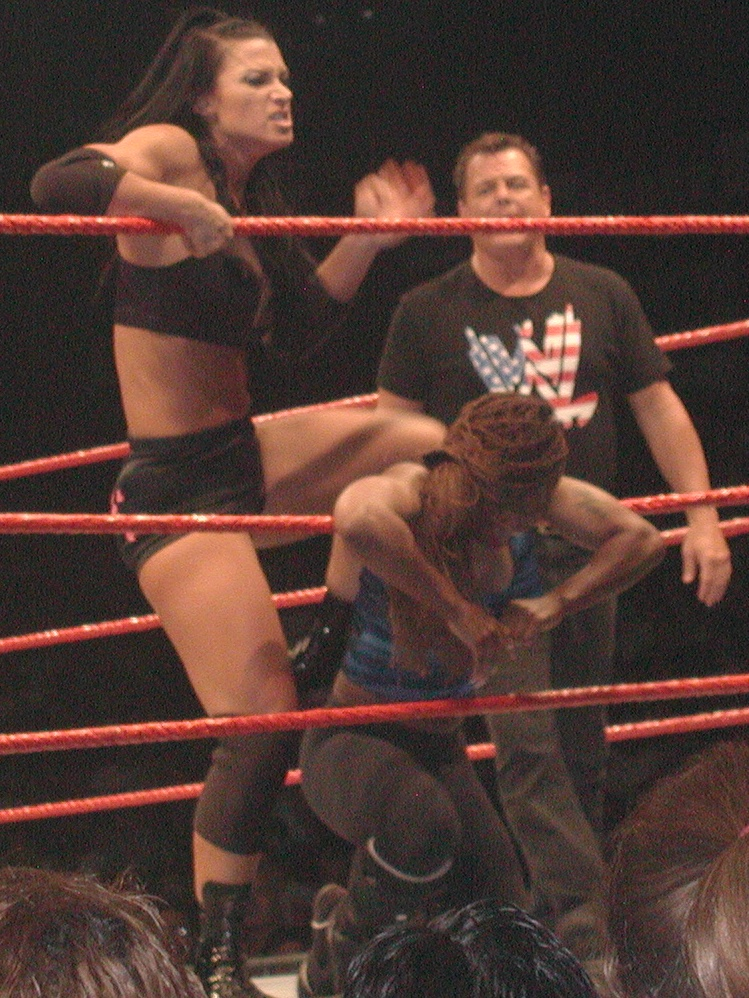
Victoria takes on Jackie Moore in 2002

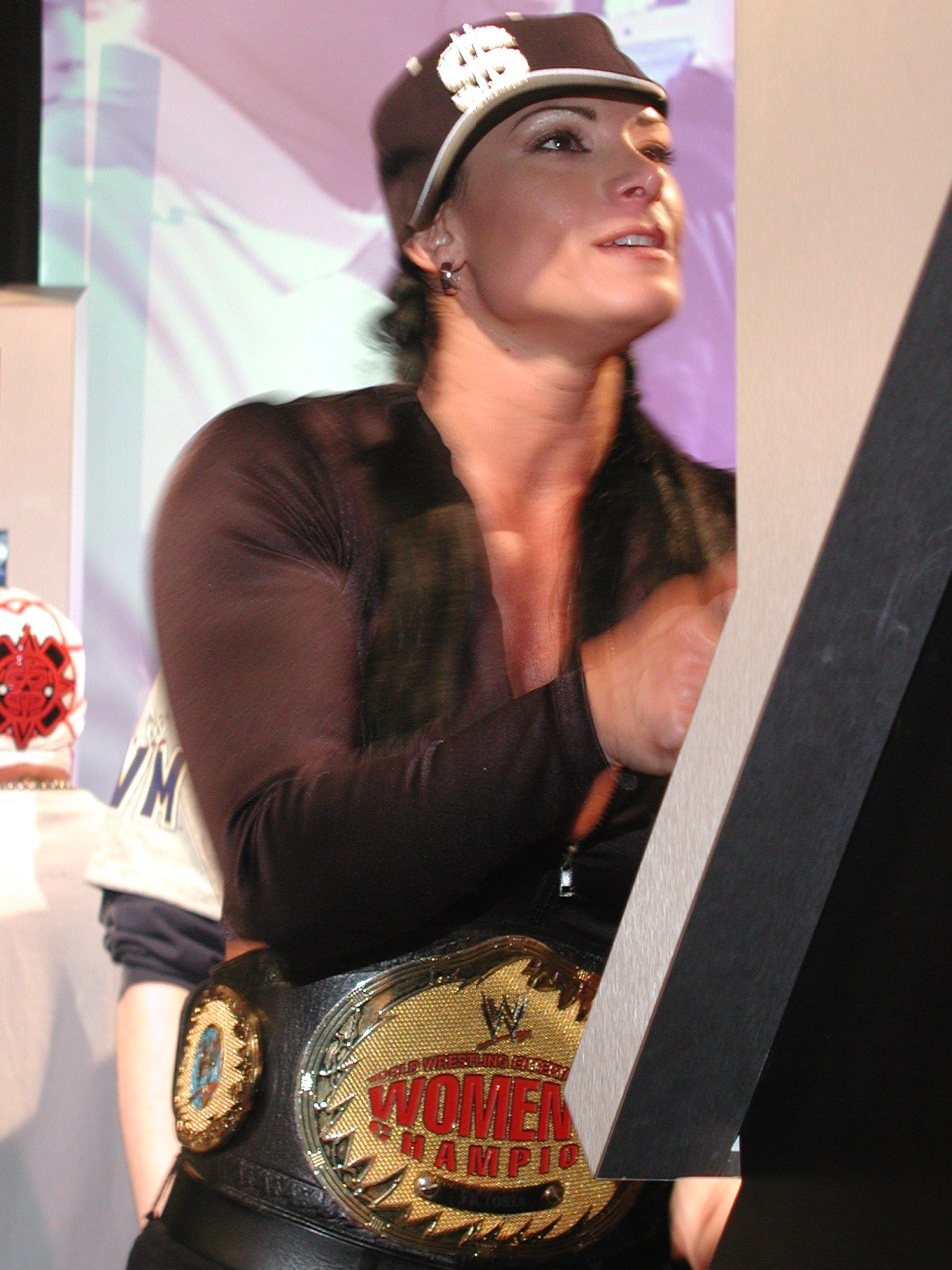
Victoria as the WWE Women's Champion in 2003

Varon returned to the renamed World Wrestling Entertainment (WWE) as Victoria on the July 7, 2002, episode of Sunday Night Heat, in an angle with Trish Stratus, who Victoria claimed had betrayed her when they worked together as fitness models. The storyline had her character become a demented, sadistic villainess, as she and Stratus feuded for months. Her first pay-per-view match came at No Mercy, where she was defeated by Stratus. The following month at Survivor Series, Victoria defeated Stratus with a Snap Suplex in a hardcore match, to win the WWE Women's Championship for the first time. Victoria would go on to successfully retain her championship against Stacy Keibler, with the debut of her finishing move, the Widows Peak. The following night on Raw, Victoria was attacked in the ring by Stratus. Steven Richards came to her aid, establishing an on-screen relationship between Victoria and Richards. At Armageddon, Victoria began using the entrance theme "All the Things She Said" by t.A.T.u. She defeated Stratus and Jacqueline to retain the WWE Women's Championship in a triple threat match.

Victoria continued to feud with Trish Stratus into 2003, competing against her in successful title defenses and mixed tag team matches, during which Victoria teamed with Richards. At WrestleMania XIX, Victoria dropped the Women's Championship back to Stratus during a Triple Threat match that also involved Jazz. She also faced wrestling legend and WWE Hall of Famer The Fabulous Moolah on September 15, 2003, in a losing effort. Throughout the rest of the year, Victoria was involved in matches against other Divas, such as participating in a Fatal Four-Way match for the Women's Championship at Judgment Day, and defeating Lita in the first women's steel cage match in WWE history on November 24. Victoria also defeated Ivory in a number one contender's match for the Women's Championship on the last episode of Sunday Night Heat of 2003. After the match, Women's Champion Molly Holly struck Victoria in the head with the title belt.

The next week on Raw, Victoria became a fan favorite, when she attacked Holly after the two women were placed in a team, along with Miss Jackie, for a six-woman tag team match. During her face run, she abandoned her sadistic and unstable personality, and began wearing hippie shorts and performed a gyrating moonsault. On January 5, 2004, Victoria was set for a title match with Molly Holly, however she was attacked by Test before the match.

The angle with Molly Holly continued into the next year, with Victoria defeating Holly in tag team matches. On February 23, 2004, Victoria defeated Holly, Lita and Jazz in a fatal four-way elimination match, to win her second Women's Championship. After defeating Holly in a tag team match the next week, Victoria was challenged by Holly to a rematch for the title at WrestleMania XX, which later became a hair vs title match. At the pay-per-view, Victoria won the match, and shaved Holly's head bald. She held the Women's Championship until June 13, when she dropped the title to the villainous Trish Stratus during a Fatal Four-Way match at Bad Blood, that also included Lita and Gail Kim, and was unsuccessful in regaining it in a rematch a week later. After defeating Molly Holly at Vengeance to become the number one contender, Victoria lost to Stratus at Unforgiven for the championship. Prior to Unforgiven, several of Victoria's matches were interrupted by a mysterious person in drag, who was later revealed to be Steven Richards, with whom she was previously allied. After the match with Stratus, the storyline culminated when Richards challenged Stratus' ally Tyson Tomko to a match, which Richards lost.

==== Vince's Devils (2005–2006) ====
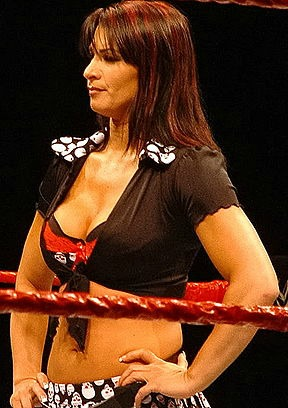
Victoria during a WWE house show in 2006

On the May 30, 2005, episode of Raw, Victoria participated in a swimsuit contest, losing to Christy Hemme. Following the loss, the storyline had Victoria become a villainess by attacking the other contestants, as well as host Jerry Lawler, claiming that she had enough of the attention Hemme was receiving. The two engaged in a short feud which culminated in a match at Vengeance, which Victoria won. During her heel run, Victoria adopted the gimmick of a bully-like enforcer, when she was placed in an angle alongside Torrie Wilson and Candice Michelle (collectively known as the Ladies in Pink, and later Vince's Devils) on August 29, portraying the role of the group's enforcer, as the three women joined forces against the 2005 Diva Search winner Ashley Massaro. Massaro was assisted in the storyline feud by Trish Stratus, and at Unforgiven, Victoria and Wilson were defeated by Stratus and Massaro. The angle continued into WWE Homecoming, where the Ladies in Pink lost a Handicap Bra and Panties match to Stratus and Massaro. The three of them competed in the first ever Bra and Panties gauntlet match, where Ashley was declared the winner by last eliminating Victoria. She lost to male wrestler Carlito on the December 26, 2005, episode of Raw. At the 2006 Royal Rumble, they appeared flirting with Vince McMahon.

On March 6, 2006, on Raw, Victoria and Candice turned on Wilson during Candice's Playboy cover unveiling, starting an angle between the former teammates. A scheduled match was set to take place at Saturday Night's Main Event XXXII with Victoria and Candice against Wilson and Stratus. As part of the storyline, however, on the episode of Raw prior to the event, Wilson was found unconscious, with the implication being that Victoria and Candice had attacked her. The match eventually took place on March 27, with Victoria and Candice being defeated. The alliance of Victoria and Candice fell apart during a tag team match on July 17, in which Victoria and Mickie James were defeated by Wilson and Trish Stratus, with Candice as the special guest referee.

==== Various feuds and departure (2007–2009) ====
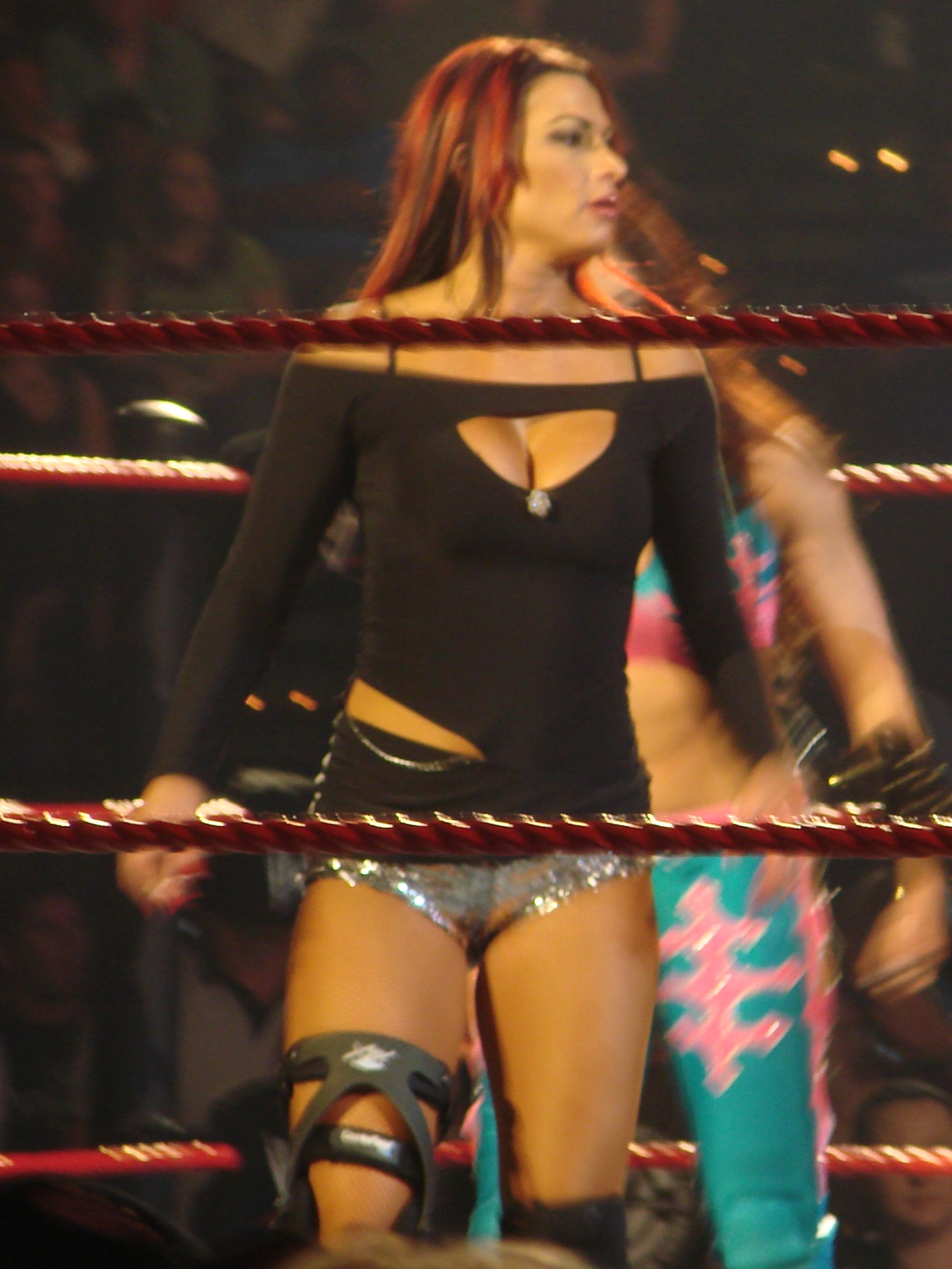
Victoria in 2007

Victoria was given a push on November 27, after she won a number one contender's battle royal. Varon gained notoriety from the match when it was reported that her kick to Candice Michelle's face had resulted in a legitimate broken nose that required surgery. Following the victory, the angle had her carry a checklist to the ring which contained the names of other Divas. Each week, she checked a name off the list after defeating them in matches. She also defeated WWE Women's Champion Mickie James in a non-title match. Victoria lost the championship match against James at New Year's Revolution, and a rematch on January 15, 2007.

On June 17, Victoria was moved to the SmackDown! brand as part of the WWE Supplemental Draft. Victoria became involved in an on-screen relationship with Kenny Dykstra, and the duo was placed in feuds against Torrie Wilson and Jimmy Wang Yang, as well as Michelle McCool and Chuck Palumbo. While on a tour of Europe with WWE in December 2007, Varon claimed to have legitimately broken McCool's nose.

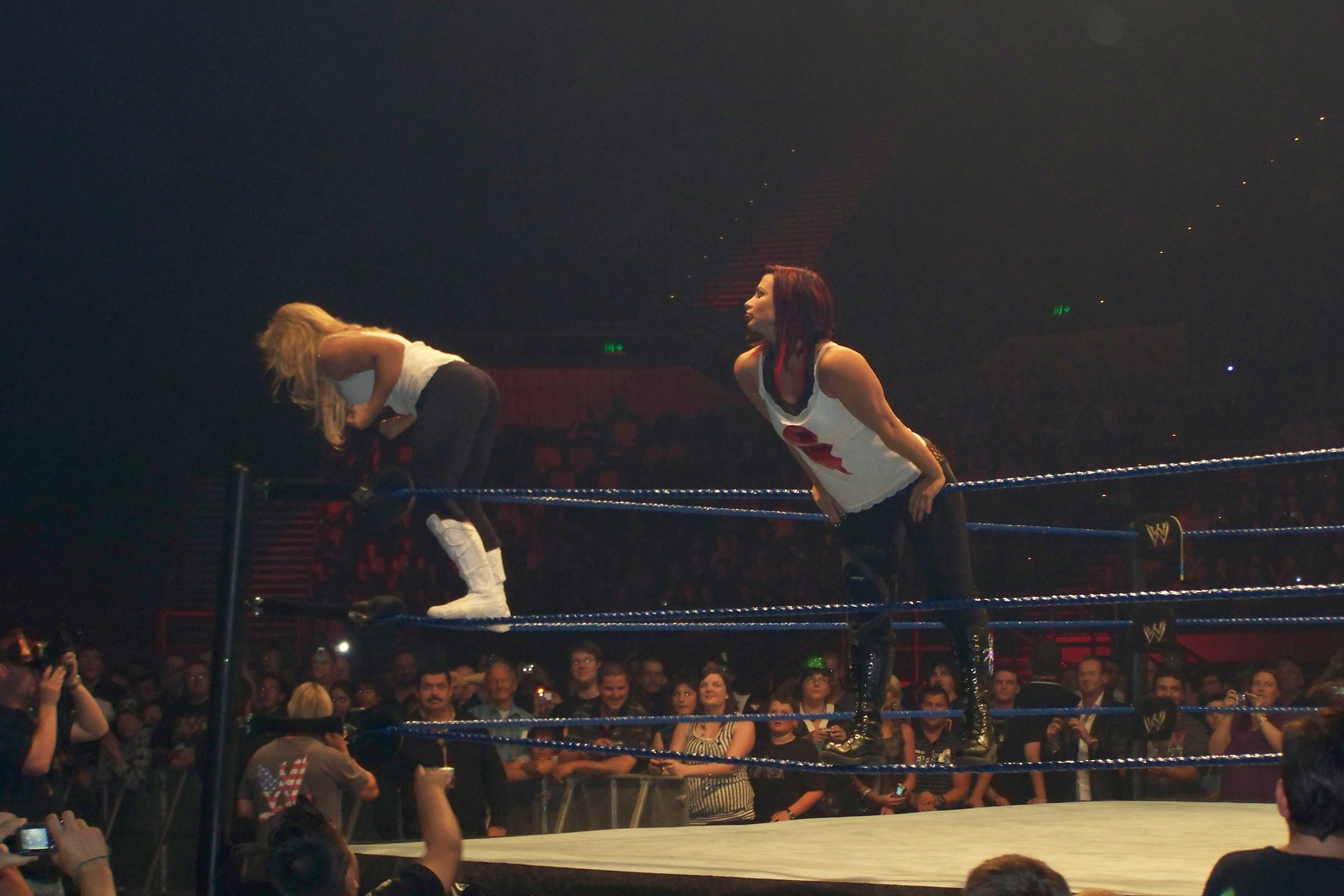
Victoria alongside Natalya during an SmackDown house show in 2008

Victoria later allied herself with the debuting Natalya in April. At the Backlash pay-per-view on April 27, Victoria teamed up with Natalya, Beth Phoenix, Jillian Hall, Layla and Melina to defeat Mickie James, Maria, Ashley, Michelle McCool, Cherry and Kelly Kelly. On the May 2 episode of SmackDown, Victoria and Natalya defeated McCool and Cherry. In October, Victoria lost to the debuting Brie Bella, when Brie disappeared under the ring during the match, emerged appearing refreshed, and won. On the September 26 episode of SmackDown, Victoria and Natalya lost to Maria and Brie. On the October 31 episode of SmackDown, Victoria teamed up with Natalya and Maryse in losing effort to Michelle McCool, Maria and Brie. On the November 7 episode of SmackDown, Victoria was accompanied by Natalya, where she was once again defeated by Brie. After the match, it was revealed that Brie had been switching places under the ring with her twin sister, Nikki Bella, and the twins proceeded to attack Victoria and Natalya. On the November 21 episode of SmackDown, Victoria teamed up with Natalya in losing effort to The Bella Twins (Nikki and Brie). On the November 28 episode of SmackDown, Victoria teamed up with Natalya and Maryse to defeat the Bella Twins and Michelle McCool.

With two more years of her contract remaining, Varon asked for her release when WWE told her they have no plans for her. Her last match took place on the January 16, 2009, episode of SmackDown, against Michelle McCool. She then thanked the fans, and gave farewell to staff at ringside.

After leaving WWE, Varon began training for a career in mixed martial arts, and practiced Jiu Jitsu. She returned to WWE for one night only in April 2009, when she was part of the 25 Divas battle royal at WrestleMania XXV, outlasting the five other former WWE Divas. She eliminated Maria, but was eliminated by The Bella Twins.

=== Total Nonstop Action Wrestling (2009–2013) ===
==== Debut and Knockouts Champion (2009–2010) ====
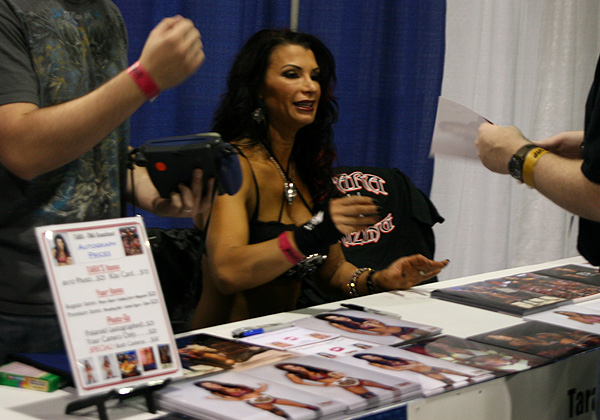
Varon signing autographs at the Chicago Comic Con in August 2009

On May 24, 2009, Total Nonstop Action Wrestling (TNA) confirmed that Varon had signed a contract with the company. She debuted on the May 28, 2009, episode of TNA Impact!, under the ring name Tara, later revealed to be short for "Tarantula". She made her intentions known by attacking The Beautiful People (Angelina Love, Velvet Sky, and Madison Rayne) after Love's match with Sojournor Bolt, establishing herself as a fan favorite. On the June 11 episode of Impact!, Tara won her debut match against Madison Rayne. On the July 1 episode of Impact!, Tara began bringing her pet tarantula, named Poison, with her to the ring. After winning a tag team match against The Beautiful People, she put the spider on the unconscious body of Velvet Sky. On the July 9 episode of Impact!, after Tara threatened to put her spider on Sky once again, Angelina Love agreed to put her TNA Knockouts Championship on the line, which Tara ultimately won, only to lose the title back to Love two weeks later at Victory Road.

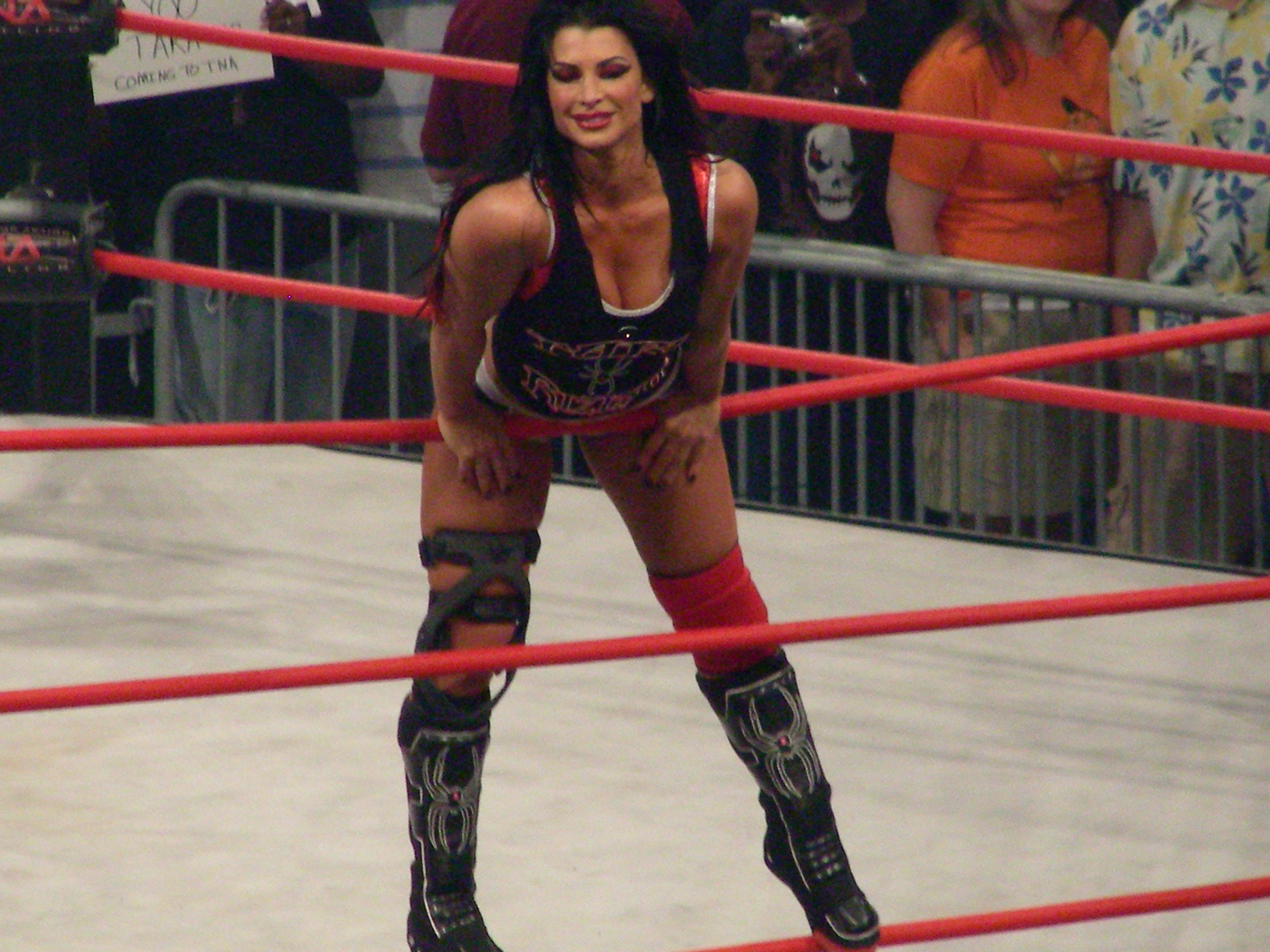
Tara in 2009

On the September 24 episode of Impact!, Tara teamed with the new Knockouts Champion ODB to challenge Sarita and Taylor Wilde for the TNA Knockouts Tag Team Championship, but they lost after Awesome Kong interrupted and distracted her during the bout. During the following two weeks of Impact!, Tara and Kong both received one-on-one Knockouts Championship matches from ODB, but both of them ended up losing after the other interfered in the match. At Bound for Glory, ODB defeated both Tara and Kong in a three-way match to retain the title. During the match, Tara was confronted by mixed martial artist Kim Couture to set up an MMA fight between the two, which, however, never came to fruition. At Turning Point, Tara defeated Kong in a Six Sides of Steel match. On November 26, Tara won a ten-woman battle royal to earn a shot at the Knockouts Championship at Final Resolution. At the event, she defeated ODB to win the Knockouts Championship for the second time. On the January 4, 2010, episode of Impact!, Tara lost the title back to ODB. Two weeks later at Genesis, Tara defeated ODB in a two out of three falls match to regain the title, making her a three-time champion.

On the February 18, 2010, episode of Impact!, Tara defeated Daffney by disqualification, after she hit Tara with a toolbox. At Destination X, Tara successfully defended her title against Daffney, who stole Poison the tarantula from her after the match. On the March 29 episode of Impact!, Tara retained her title against Daffney for a second time, this time in the first ever women's First Blood match in TNA. On the April 5 episode of Impact!, Tara was one of the four winners in an eight-Knockout Lockbox match. The box she opened contained her pet tarantula, Poison. At the same time, however, Tara lost the Knockouts Championship to Angelina Love, and began turning villainous due to her friction with Love heading into their match against The Beautiful People. At Lockdown, the villainous Tara attacked Love after losing a tag team steel cage match against Rayne and Sky, cementing Tara's heel turn.

==== Alliance with Madison Rayne (2010–2011) ====
On April 28, 2010, Varon announced on her MySpace blog that she would be leaving TNA the following month, after refusing to re-sign with the company, due to not receiving a pay increase. On the May 3 episode of Impact!, Tara challenged Madison Rayne to a match at Sacrifice, where she would put her career on the line against Rayne's Knockouts Championship. At Sacrifice on May 16, Tara failed to win the match, and as a result her TNA career came to an end. After her TNA career came to a halt, she continued to discuss a new contract with Dixie Carter.

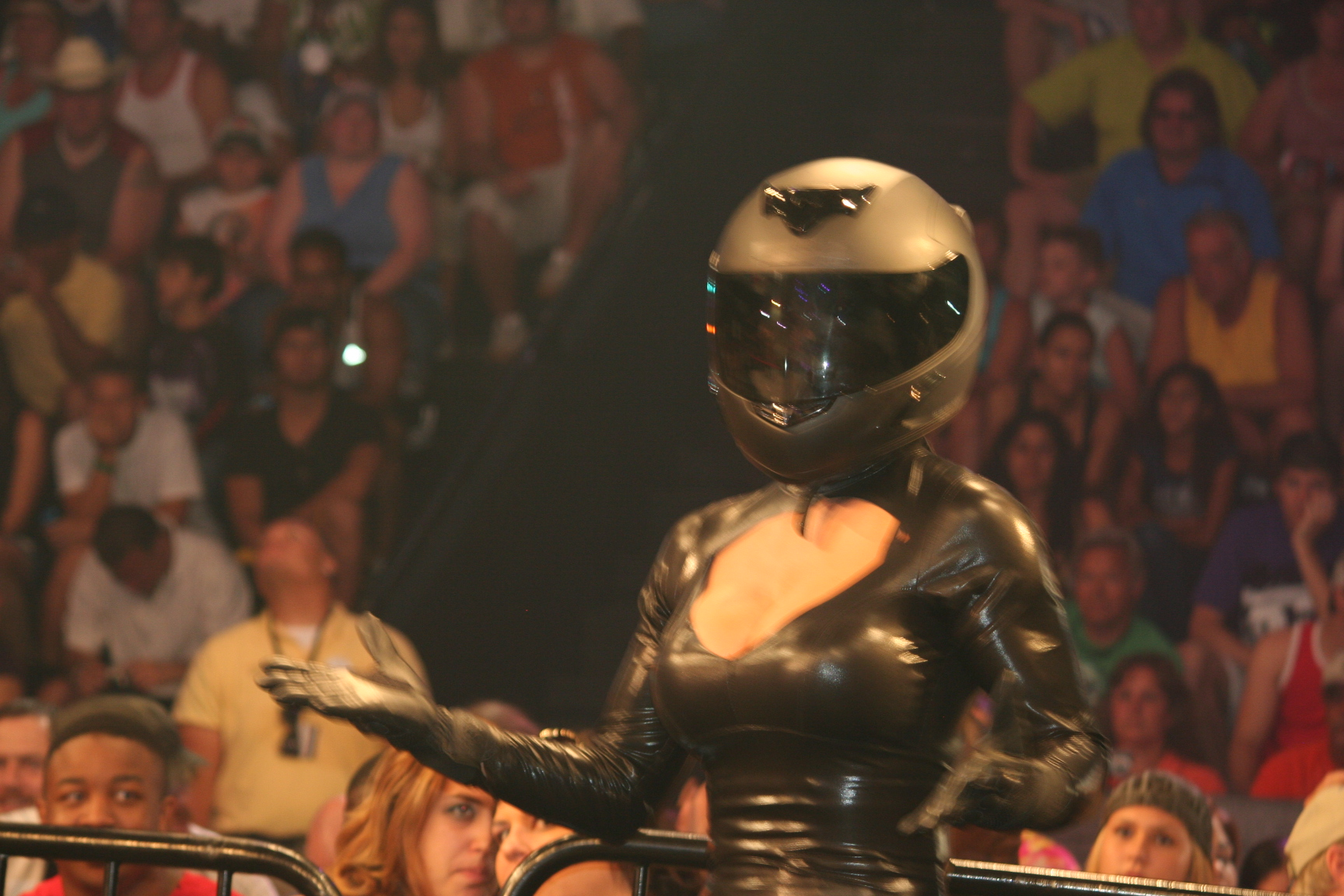
Tara upon her return to TNA while wearing a motorcycle helmet in 2010

She returned to the company on July 11 at Victory Road as a villainess, disguising herself by wearing a motorcycle helmet and attacking Angelina Love during her match for the Knockouts Championship. In the following weeks, she aligned herself with Madison Rayne against Love and Velvet Sky. Tara was ultimately unmasked on the September 2 episode of Impact!, when she and Rayne defeated Love and Sky in a tag team match, after hitting Sky with the motorcycle helmet. On the September 30 episode of Impact!, Rayne signed a waiver to allow Tara to return to in-ring competition. At Bound for Glory, Tara defeated Angelina Love, Velvet Sky, and Madison Rayne in a Four Corners match to win the Knockout Championship for the fourth time, much to the dismay of Rayne, who thought Tara's intention was to help her regain the title. On the following episode of Impact!, Tara laid down for Rayne and allowed her to pin her to regain the Knockouts Championship, giving Tara the shortest reign in the title's history. The following week, Tara attacked Mickie James after her victory over Sarita. At Turning Point, Tara wrestled James to a double disqualification, after James pushed the referee, and they began brawling. On the December 2 Impact!, Tara attacked James while she was singing her single "Hardcore Country", which later led to James attacking her. At Final Resolution, Tara defeated James in a Falls Count Anywhere match, following interference from Madison Rayne. On the following episode of Impact!, James defeated Tara in a steel cage match. During the match, Tara legitimately tore a ligament in her elbow, but the injury did not require surgery. On the December 16 episode of Impact!, Tara and Rayne defeated James and Ms. Tessmacher to advance the finals of a tournament for the vacant TNA Knockouts Tag Team Championship. The following week, they were defeated in the finals by Angelina Love and Winter.

In 2011, Madison Rayne would start a rivalry with Mickie James over the Knockouts Championship, and would successfully defend the title against her at Genesis and Against All Odds, after Tara interfered in both matches. During the feud, Tara began claiming that Rayne had gone too far in her brutality towards Mickie James, but was forced to follow her orders due to being under exclusive contract with her, and not TNA. After Rayne lost the Knockouts Championship to James at Lockdown, James agreed to give her a rematch on the condition that if she is unable to regain the title, Tara would be released from her contract with Rayne. On May 15 at Sacrifice, Tara became a fan favorite after knocking out Rayne during her match with James, costing her the Knockouts Championship and guaranteeing herself a release from her contract with Rayne.

==== TnT, relationship with Jesse and departure (2011–2013) ====
Tara and Madison Rayne had their first match against each other since the break–up of their partnership on the May 19 episode of Impact Wrestling, where Tara teamed with Mickie James and Ms. Tessmacher against Rayne, Sarita and Rosita. Tara won the match for her team by pinning Rosita, after Rayne, who avoided her former partner throughout the match, sacrificed her in order to get away from the ring. Tara and Rayne faced each other again on the July 14 episode of Impact Wrestling, where Tara was victorious after distracting Rayne with her tarantula. On the July 21 episode of Impact Wrestling, Tara and Ms. Tessmacher, later named TnT, defeated Mexican America (Rosita and Sarita) to win the TNA Knockouts Tag Team Championship. Tessmacher and Tara made their first title defense on August 7 at Hardcore Justice, defeating Mexican America in a rematch. On the September 29 episode of Impact Wrestling, Tara was defeated by her former partner Madison Rayne in a match to determine the third and final challenger for the TNA Knockouts Championship at Bound for Glory. On the November 3 episode of Impact Wrestling, Tara and Tessmacher lost the Knockouts Tag Team Championship to Gail Kim and Madison Rayne. On the January 26, 2012, episode of Impact Wrestling, Tara defeated Mickie James and Velvet Sky in a three-way match to earn a match for the Knockouts Championship. On February 12 at Against All Odds, Tara was unsuccessful in her title challenge against Gail Kim.

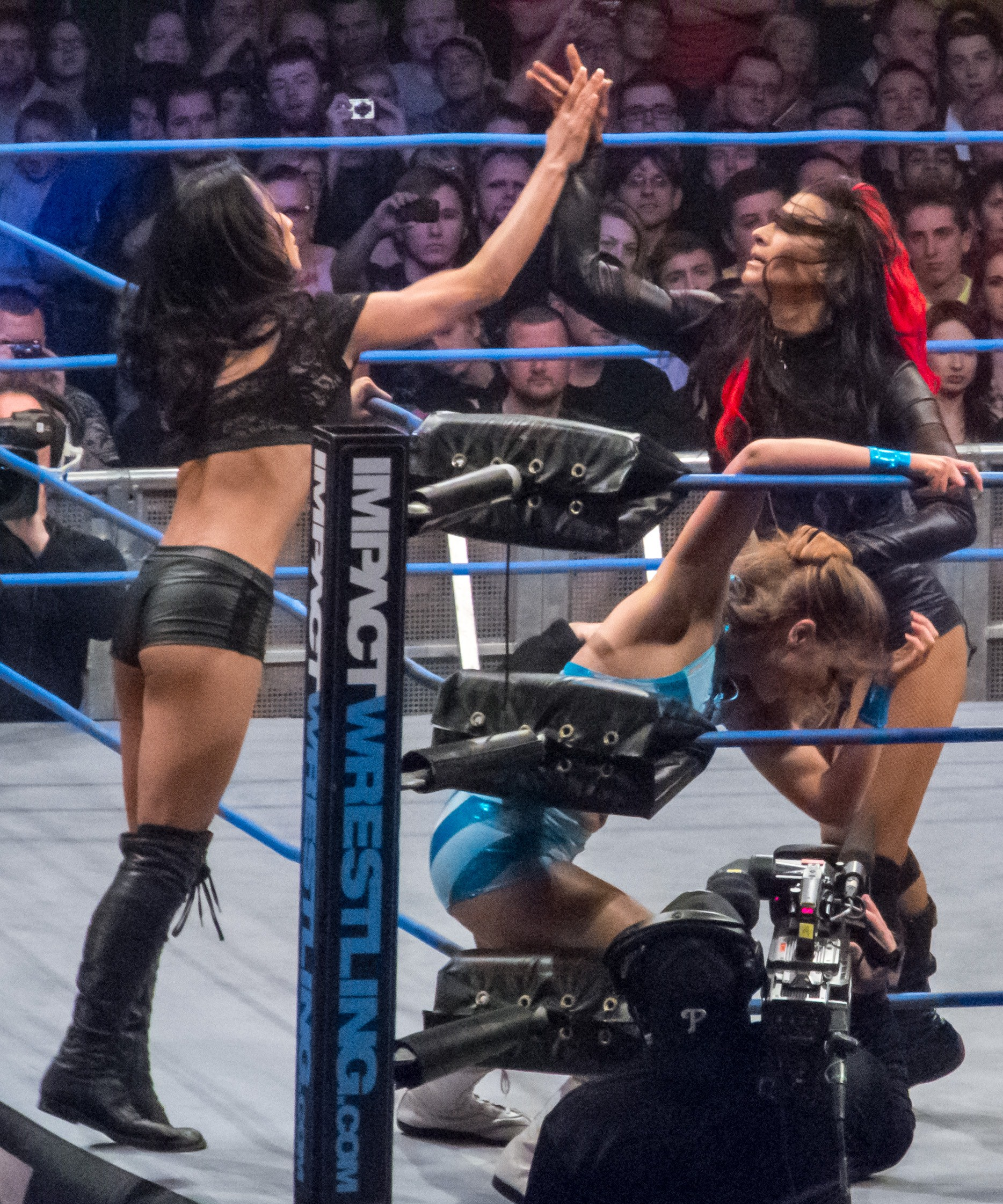
Tara tags in Gail Kim in 2013

On the August 23 episode of Impact Wrestling, Tara defeated the new Knockouts Champion and TnT partner Miss Tessmacher in a non-title match, and was subsequently named number one contender for her title. On September 9 at the No Surrender, Tara challenged Tessmacher for the Knockouts Championship, but failed to capture the title. On the following episode of Impact Wrestling, Tara congratulated Tessmacher on her victory, only to attack Tessmacher shortly afterwards, turning Tara into a villainess and effectively disbanding TnT. On the September 27 episode of Impact Wrestling, Tara defeated ODB in a number one contender's match to earn another shot at Miss Tessmacher's Knockouts Championship. On October 14 at Bound for Glory, Tara defeated Tessmacher to win the TNA Knockouts Championship for a record-tying fifth time. Afterwards, Tara introduced her "Hollywood boyfriend", the debuting Jesse. Tara made her first successful title defense on the October 25 episode of Impact Wrestling, defeating Tessmacher in a rematch following interference from Jesse. On November 11 at Turning Point, Tara and Jesse were defeated by ODB and Eric Young. On December 9 at Final Resolution, Tara successfully defended her Knockouts Championship against Mickie James after a distraction from Jesse. On the December 20 episode of Impact Wrestling, Tara defeated James again to retain her title. Tara went on to have another successful title defense on the January 25, 2013, episode of Impact Wrestling, defeating Velvet Sky. On the February 21 episode of Impact Wrestling taped in London, England, Tara lost the championship to Sky in a fatal four-way elimination match, also involving Gail Kim and Miss Tessmacher, ending her reign at 104 days. Tara received her rematch on the February 28 episode of Impact Wrestling, but was again defeated by Sky. The following months, Tara would make increasingly fewer appearances, and would be rarely used competing in matches. On the July 14 episode of TNA Xplosion, Tara would wrestle her final match in TNA losing to ODB. Two days later on July 16, Tara was released from her TNA contract. Varon later stated in an interview that she was close to leaving TNA prior to her release, and that she would never return to TNA. She also stated that her tenure in TNA was great, but different from WWE and made her "appreciate WWE a lot".

=== Independent circuit (2011–2019) ===
Tara took part of Family Wrestling Entertainment's FWE: Fallout pay-per-view on November 15, 2011, defeating Madison Rayne with Christy Hemme as the special guest referee. Tara returned to the promotion on February 25, 2012, taking part of a tournament to determinate the inaugural FWE Women's Champion at FWE: No Limits, losing to Maria Kanellis. Tara then helped Maria defeat Winter to win the championship alongside her partner Ms. Tessmacher. On November 9, 2013, Varon debuted at House of Hardcore 3, where she and Stevie Richards were defeated by Carlito and Rosita.

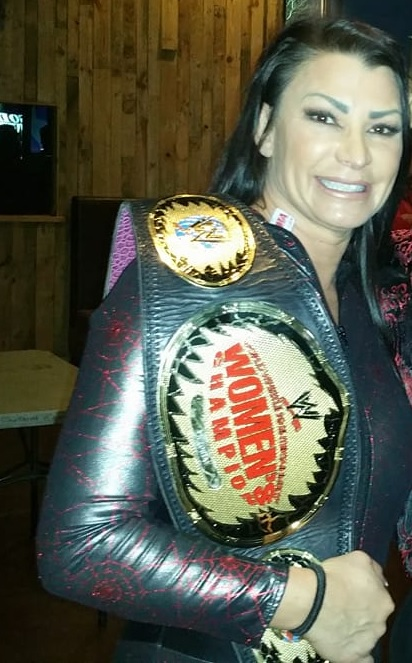
Varon in 2018

Varon debuted for Ring of Honor on October 26, 2013, under her real name. She made an FAQ before Glory by Honor XII. At the event, she attacked Maria Kanellis with a Widow's Peak.

On June 19, 2015, Varon appeared at Maryland Championship Wrestling's Ladies Night event as the special guest referee for the MCW Women's Championship main event match between Mickie James and Amber Rodriguez, attacking villainous enforcer Melina during the match following Melina's attack towards James, who went on to capture the title.

On September 2, 2016, Victoria made her debut for Chikara, when she entered the 2016 King of Trios tournament as part of Team Original Divas Revolution, alongside Jazz and Mickie James. They defeated Team Shimmer (Candice LeRae, Crazy Mary Dobson and Solo Darling) in their first round match. The following day, Team Original Divas Revolution was eliminated from the tournament by The Warriors Three (Oleg the Usurper, Princess KimberLee and ThunderFrog).

On December 2, 2017, Varon appeared at House of Hardcore 36 as Candice Michelle's opponent in Candice's retirement match. Varon turned heel and attacked Candice after feigning an injury, only to be defeated by Candice with a DDT.

On January 6, 2019, Varon announced that it would be her last year as an active wrestler. She competed in her last match in the main event at Master of Ring Entertainment on September 21, 2019; defeating Melina to become the inaugural MORE Women's Champion.

=== Return to WWE and Impact Wrestling (2021–present) ===
In November 2020 in a meeting for WrestlingInc.com, Varon showed interest in working for All Elite Wrestling (AEW) in a backstage space. She believed she could fulfill company needs as a trainer or agent and share her extensive knowledge about the business.

In 2021 Royal Rumble, Victoria was the 10th entrant in the Women's Royal Rumble match, which her first appearance in WWE since 2009. Victoria was the 5th contestant to be eliminated after being thrown over the top rope by Shayna Baszler. Later that year, WWE Network added her in a list of top 50 female wrestlers in the history of the company.

In January 2023, Varon appeared as Tara in Impact Wrestling at Hard To Kill 2023 to support Mickie James in her title vs. career match against Jordynne Grace, appearing in a backstage segment and in-ring to celebrate with James upon her victory. On January 14, Varon returned during Impact television tapings, teaming up with Gisele Shaw to challenge the Death Dollz (Jessicka & Taya Valkyrie) for the Impact Knockouts World Tag Team Championship, but they lost.

On August 31, 2024, Varon revealed via her Twitter that she had signed with WWE under a Legends contract, and revealed that her wrestling gimmick likeness will be included in WWE merchandise like video games and action figures. In July 2026, she confirmed that she had retired from in-ring wrestling.

== Legacy and professional wrestling style ==
In a career that has spanned over 2 decades, Varon is overall a seven-time champion between WWE and TNA and is considered to be a legend in the wrestling industry. She has influenced the likes of Maryse, Bayley, Jessie McKay, Cassie Lee, Tenille Dashwood, Brandi Rhodes and many more. Five-time WWE Women's Champion, one-time WWE Divas Champion and three-time TNA Knockouts Champion Mickie James said of Varon's influence: “she was breaking down barriers in that whole era of women.”. Supported by her colleagues such as James, Molly Holly, Trish Stratus, Beth Phoenix, Natalya, SoCal Val and more, she is among the top picks to be the next inductee into the WWE Hall of Fame. In 2021, WWE Network ranked Victoria as one of the greatest WWE female wrestlers of all time, placing Number 14.

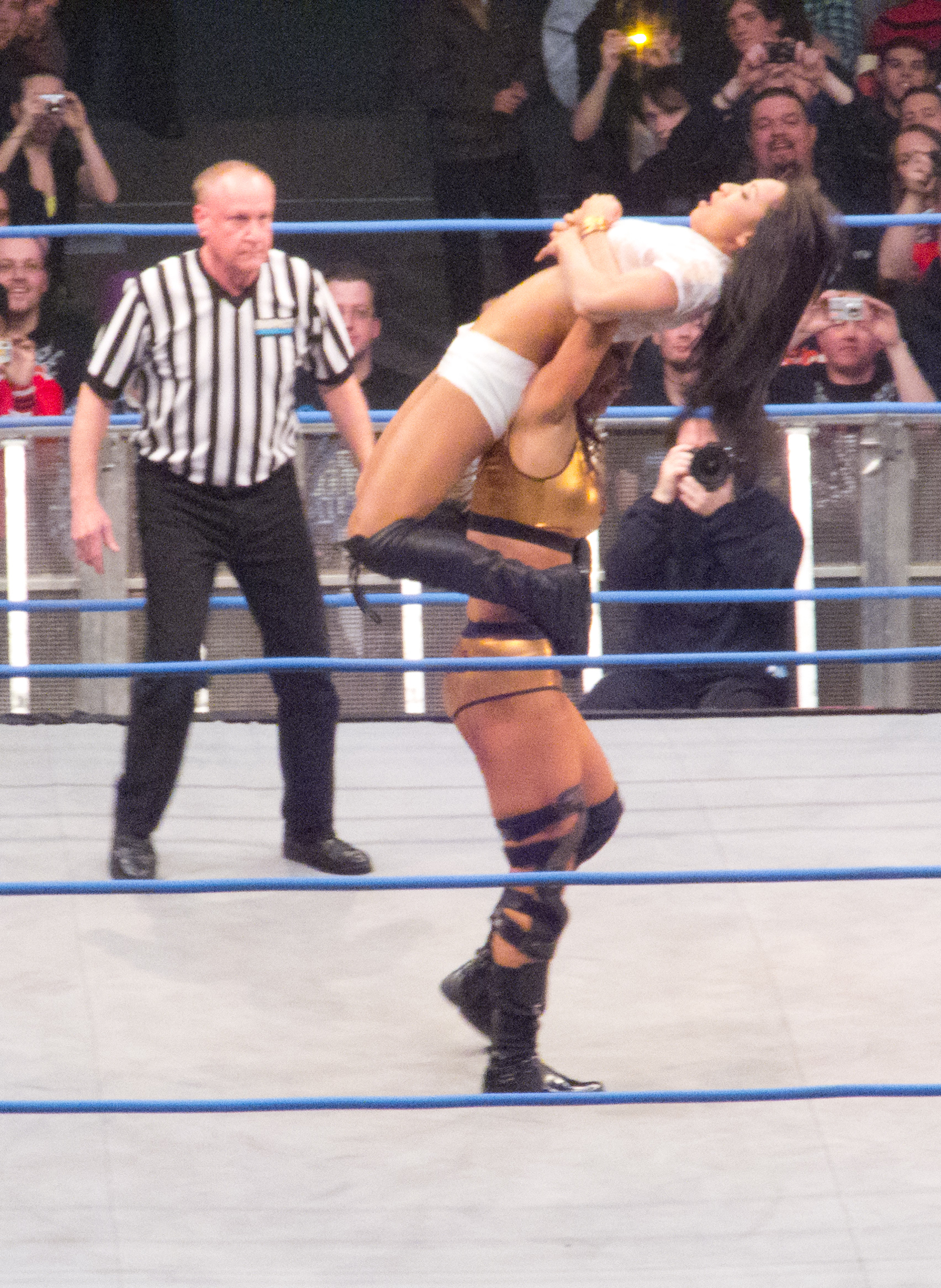
Varon, executing the Widow's Peak on Gail Kim at a TNA show in 2012

Varon's finisher is a gory neckbreaker called the Widow's Peak. According to Varon, she credits Roderick Strong for the move, while also crediting Molly Holly for suggesting the move. Holly then reveals that she wrestled with Strong in their teens, in which Holly saw Strong using the move and decided to pass the knowledge of the move to Varon.

== Filmography ==
Varon has made guest appearances on television shows V.I.P. and Nikki, as well as participated in two fitness competitions for the Univision program Sábado Gigante. In November 2010, she was a contestant on an all-TNA week of Family Feud, teaming with Angelina Love, Christy Hemme, Lacey Von Erich and Velvet Sky against Jay Lethal, Matt Morgan, Mick Foley, Mr. Anderson and Rob Van Dam. On November 10, 2012, Varon, along with several other TNA employees, were featured in an episode of MTV's Made.

=== Film and television ===
Year	Title	Role	Notes
1999	Sábado Gigante	Fitness competitor	2 episodes
2000	V.I.P	Bodyguard	1 episode
2000	Nikki	Chickasaurus	1 episode
2001	WWE Tough Enough	Victoria	1 episode
2001	WWE Divas in Hedonism	Victoria	Scenes deleted
2002	WWE Divas: Undressed	Victoria	Direct to DVD
2003	WWE Divas: Desert Heat	Victoria	Direct to DVD
2003	WWE: Trish Stratus - 100% Stratusfaction	Victoria	Documentary
2003	Spike TV VGA Video Game Awards	Victoria; guest	TV special
2004	10 Things Every Guy Should Experience	Self; guest	1 episode
2004	WWE Byte This!	Victoria	1 episode
2004	WWE Hall of Fame 2004	Self; guest	TV special
2004	WWE Divas: South of the Border	Victoria	Direct to DVD
2005	WWE Hall of Fame 2005	Self; guest	TV special
2005	WWE Viva Las Divas	Victoria	Direct to DVD
2005	Trisha	Victoria; guest	1 episode
2006	WWE Hall of Fame 2006	Self; guest	TV special
2006	WWE Divas Do New York	Victoria	Direct to DVD
2007	WWE Hall of Fame 2007	Self; guest	TV special
2008	WWE Hall of Fame 2008	Self; guest	TV special
2009	WWE Hall of Fame 2009	Self; guest	TV special
2010	Family Feud	Tara; contestant	1 episode
2012	Made	Tara; guest	1 episode
2012	The Late Live Show	Self; guest	1 episode
2013	Svengoolie	Self; guest	2 episodes
2014	Tainted Dreams	Carla Santiago	Recurring role
2014	The Swerve	Self; guest	1 episode
2015	Paragon Pro TV	Self; guest	2 episodes
2017	Fox 10 News	Self; guest	1 episode
2017	Ballerina I'm Not	Victoria	
2018	Love	Mayday Marge	1 episode
2019	WWE Hall of Fame 2019	Self; guest	TV special
2019	The Blake & Sal Show	Self; guest panelist	1 episode
2020	You Cannot Kill David Arquette	Self	Documentary
2021	Just Roll with It	Tilda	1 episode
2021	WWE Day of	Self	1 episode
2021	WWE Ruthless Aggression	Self	Documentary
2021	WWE The Bump	Self; guest	1 episode
2022	Sidewalks Entertainment	Self; guest	1 episode
2022	Hollywood Entertainment News TV Show	Self; guest	1 episode
2022	Out in the Ring	Self	Documentary
2023	Raven Van Slender Saves Christmas!	Lisa	
2025	WWE Hall of Fame 2025	Self; guest	TV special
2026	WWE Hall of Fame 2026	Self; guest	TV special
TBA	A Pro-Rasslin' Movie: The Legend of Dirty Ron	TBA	In production

=== Video games ===
Year	Title	Role	Notes
2003	WWE WrestleMania XIX	Victoria	Video game debut
2003	WWE Raw 2	Victoria	
2003	WWE SmackDown! Here Comes the Pain	Victoria	
2004	WWE Day of Reckoning	Victoria	
2004	WWE SmackDown! vs. Raw	Victoria	
2005	RAW Mobile	Victoria	
2005	WWE WrestleMania 21	Victoria	Removed, unplayable
2005	WWE SmackDown! vs. RAW 2006	Victoria	Removed, unplayable
2008	WWE SmackDown vs. Raw 2009	Victoria	
2025	WWE 2K25		DLC
2026	WWE 2K26		
TBA	The Wrestling Code	TBA	In Development

=== Podcasts ===
Year	Title	Role	Notes
2019-2022	Ring The Belle	Herself	3 episodes
2023	Mike Lewis Podcast	Herself	1 episode

== Personal life ==
Lisa Marie Varon

YouTube information
- Channel: Lisa Marie Varon
- Years active: 2012–2015
- Subscribers: 4.3 thousand
- Views: 502 thousand
- Last updated: July 1, 2025

Varon was married to Lee Varon from 1994 to 2015. They had no children. Varon claims that during a separation from her husband in 2002, she briefly dated fellow wrestler John Cena. The relationship between Varon and Cena had previously been mentioned by another wrestler, Kenny Dykstra.

Varon has a tattoo of a heart on her ankle, which she got in high school and hid from her parents. She is a fan of motorcycles and owns a Suzuki Hayabusa.

Varon is Jewish.

=== Business ventures ===
Varon owned a restaurant in Louisville, Kentucky named Fat Tony's Pizzeria, but sold it in May 2007. In May 2008, she and her husband opened a custom car shop, Black Widow Customs, in Louisville. The shop was destroyed on December 16, 2010, in a fire, which the authorities deemed suspicious. This occurred the day after a local TV show's "Consumer Watch" segment. Antwane Glenn, a football player at the University of Kentucky, wanted a refund after claiming his car was left un-drivable following Black Widow Customs' work on it. He contacted WHAS11 and the story was profiled on the show.

In March 2013, Varon opened a wrestling themed restaurant in Chicago, Illinois named The Squared Circle. In January 2015, Varon announced that she would be moving back to California, and leaving the restaurant to be run by her estranged husband Lee Varon. In March 2015, the restaurant was put up for sale. One week later, a gunman entered the restaurant and Lee Varon was able to incapacitate the man until police arrived. Days after the gunman incident and the resulting media attention, Lisa Marie Varon announced her intention to close the establishment and that she would no longer support the business or encourage fellow wrestlers to make promotional appearances there. The restaurant closed on April 10, 2017, just two years after the gunman incident.

== Championships and accomplishments ==
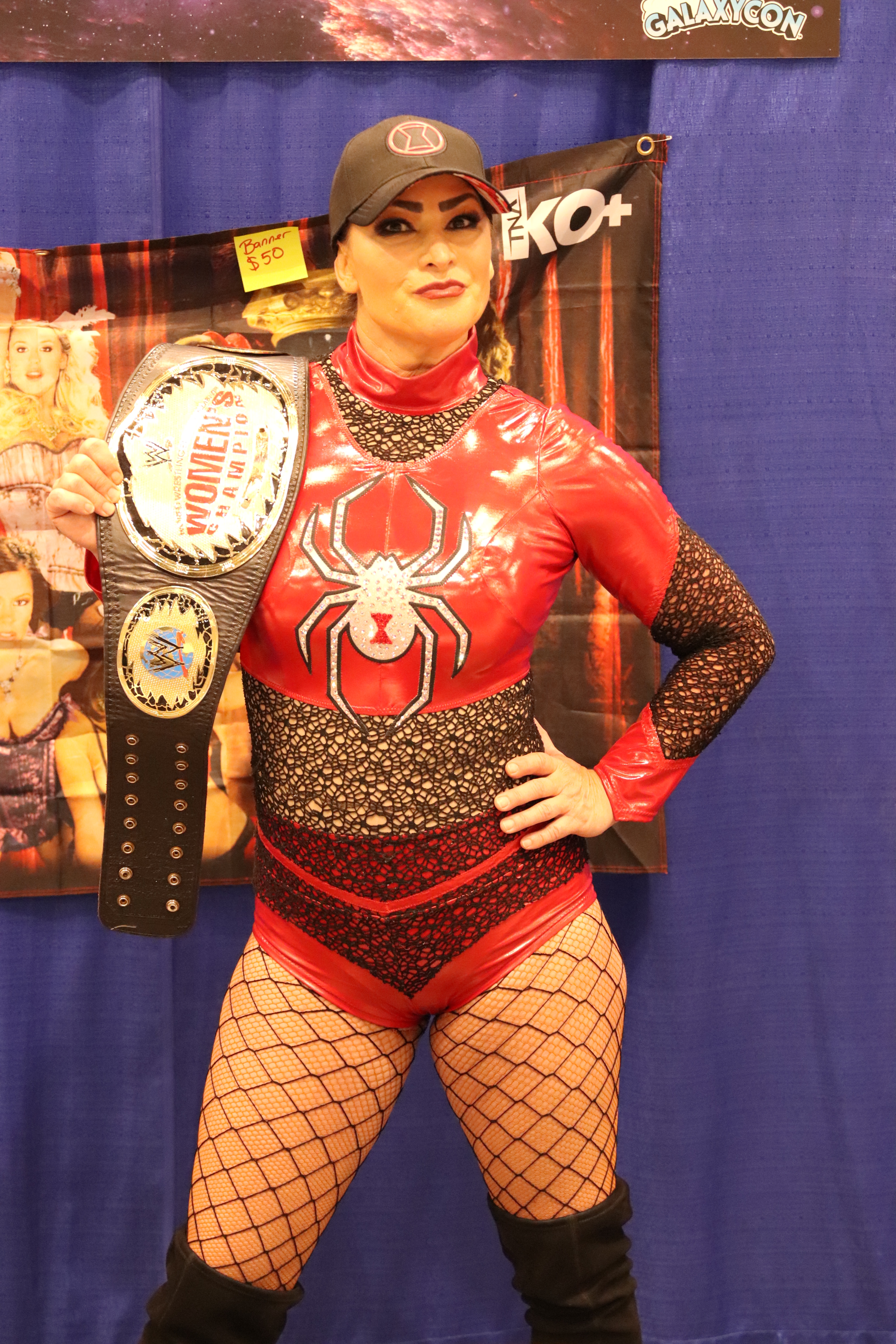
Victoria is a two-time WWE Women's Champion

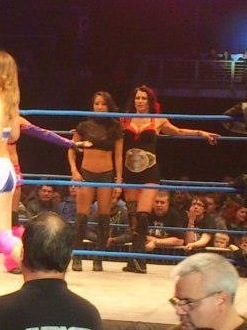
Tara is a five-time TNA Knockout's Champion

=== Cheerleading ===
- National Cheerleading Association
  - NCA All-American Award

=== Fitness and figure competition ===
- Debbie Kruck Fitness Classic
  - 1st (Tall Class; 1999)
- ESPN2 Fitness America Series
  - 1st place (1997)
  - 2nd place (1998)
- Lifequest Triple Crown
  - Top 20 (1997)
- National Physique Committee
  - NPC Inland Empire – 1st (MW; 1995)
  - NPC Team Universe – 2nd (Tall Class; 1999)
- Women's Tri-Fitness
  - Ironwoman Tri-Fitness – 4th (1998)
  - Tri-Fitness Hall of Fame (2012)

=== Professional wrestling ===
- Cauliflower Alley Club
  - Women's Wrestling Award (2015)
- Master of Ring Entertainment
  - MORE Wrestling Women's Heavyweight Championship (1 time)
- Pro Wrestling Illustrated
  - PWI Woman of the Year (2004)
  - Ranked No. 5 of the top 50 female wrestlers in the PWI Female 50 in 2009
- Total Nonstop Action Wrestling
  - TNA Knockouts Championship (5 times)
  - TNA Knockouts Tag Team Championship (1 time) – with Brooke Tessmacher
- Women's Wrestling Hall of Fame
  - Class of 2024
- World Wrestling Entertainment
  - WWE Women's Championship (2 times)

== Luchas de Apuestas record ==
Winner (wager)	Loser (wager)	Location	Event	Date	Notes
Victoria (championship)	Molly Holly (hair)	New York City, New York	WrestleMania XX	March 14, 2004	
Madison Rayne (championship)	Tara (career)	Orlando, Florida	Sacrifice	May 16, 2010	
