= No Mercy (2002) =

World Wrestling Entertainment pay-per-view event

- Promotional poster featuring Kane's mask
- Promotion: World Wrestling Entertainment
- Brand(s): Raw; SmackDown!
- Date: October 20, 2002
- City: North Little Rock, Arkansas
- Venue: Alltel Arena
- Attendance: 10,000
- Buy rate: 300,000

Pay-per-view chronology
← Previous; Unforgiven	Next → Rebellion

No Mercy chronology
← Previous; 2001	Next → 2003

The 2002 No Mercy was a professional wrestling pay-per-view (PPV) event produced by World Wrestling Entertainment (WWE). It was the fifth No Mercy and took place on October 20, 2002, at the Alltel Arena in North Little Rock, Arkansas, held for wrestlers from the promotion's Raw and SmackDown! brand divisions.

This was the first No Mercy held following the introduction of the brand extension in March and was subsequently the last No Mercy to feature multiple brands until 2007, as beginning with Bad Blood in June 2003, all monthly PPVs outside of the "Big Four" (WrestleMania, SummerSlam, Survivor Series, and Royal Rumble) became brand-exclusive until brand-exclusive PPVs were discontinued after WrestleMania 23 in April 2007. This was also the first No Mercy held under the WWE name after the promotion was renamed from World Wrestling Federation (WWF) to WWE in May.

The event featured two main events. The main event from the SmackDown! brand featured WWE Champion Brock Lesnar defeating The Undertaker in a Hell in a Cell match to retain the title. The main event from the Raw brand was a title unification match, where World Heavyweight Champion Triple H defeated WWE Intercontinental Champion Kane to unify the Intercontinental Championship into the World Heavyweight Championship, deactivating the Intercontinental Championship (until it was reactivated the following year).

The undercard featured Kurt Angle and Chris Benoit versus Edge and Rey Mysterio to determine SmackDown!'s inaugural WWE Tag Team Champions. Other matches included Trish Stratus versus Victoria for Raw's WWE Women's Championship, Jamie Noble versus Tajiri for SmackDown!'s WWE Cruiserweight Championship, Rob Van Dam versus Ric Flair, Torrie Wilson versus Dawn Marie, and Chris Jericho and Christian versus Booker T and Goldust for Raw's World Tag Team Championship.

== Production ==
=== Background ===
No Mercy was first held by World Wrestling Entertainment (WWE) as a United Kingdom-exclusive professional wrestling pay-per-view (PPV) in May 1999. A second No Mercy was then held later that same year in October, but in the United States, which established No Mercy as the annual October PPV for the promotion. The fifth No Mercy event was held on October 20, 2002, at the Alltel Arena in North Little Rock, Arkansas.

This was the first No Mercy held under the WWE name as the promotion was renamed from World Wrestling Federation (WWF) to WWE in May. It was also the first No Mercy to be held after the introduction of the brand extension in March, in which the promotion divided its roster between the Raw and SmackDown! brands, where wrestlers were exclusively assigned to perform. The 2002 event in turn featured wrestlers from both brands.

=== Storylines ===
The event featured nine professional wrestling matches with outcomes predetermined by WWE. The matches featured wrestlers portraying their characters in planned storylines that took place before, during, and after the event. All wrestlers were from either one of WWE's brands – Raw or SmackDown! – the two storyline divisions in which WWE assigned its employees.

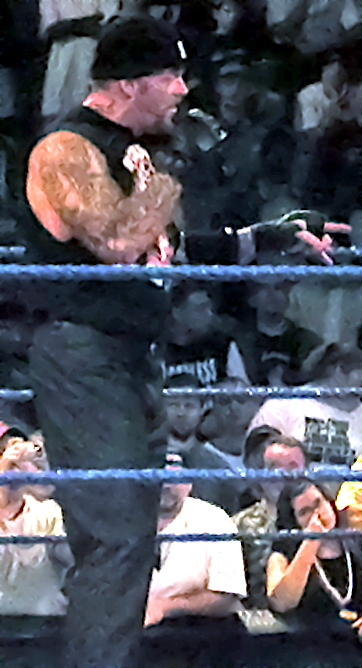
The Undertaker challenged Brock Lesnar for SmackDown!'s WWE Championship in a Hell in a Cell match at the event

The main rivalry from the SmackDown! brand was between Brock Lesnar and The Undertaker over the WWE Championship. At Unforgiven, Lesnar defended the title against The Undertaker in a singles match. The match resulted in a no contest after the referee was attacked by the brawling Lesnar and The Undertaker. On the September 26 episode of SmackDown!, The Undertaker defeated Matt Hardy, who had interfered in Lesnar and The Undertaker's match at Unforgiven. After the match, Lesnar attacked The Undertaker with the WWE title belt. On the October 3 episode of SmackDown!, Hardy defeated The Undertaker in a Falls Count Anywhere match after Lesnar interfered, and hit an F-5 on The Undertaker. Afterwards, Lesnar broke The Undertaker's hand with a propane tank. Later that night, Lesnar was informed by his manager Paul Heyman that the SmackDown! General Manager Stephanie McMahon had ordered Lesnar to defend the title against The Undertaker in a rematch at No Mercy, this time in a Hell in a Cell match. On the October 10 episode of SmackDown!, Lesnar and Heyman found an unorthodox, but very effective way to distract The Undertaker leading up to their match. Heyman and Lesnar escorted a young woman to the arena, causing speculation to swirl about her identity. During the segment, Heyman tipped his hand as he explained that the woman – Tracy – would show just what kind of man The Undertaker was. As The Undertaker made his way to the ring, Tracy found herself in the ring staring face-to-face with him. She erupted into a fury, and accused The Undertaker of lying to her and sleeping with her for three months. She stated that she had no idea that The Undertaker was married and that his wife Sara was pregnant, and apologized to Sara, saying she hated that the news had to be broken that way. The Undertaker claimed that he had never even seen Tracy before, much less had an affair with her. This he earned him a slap to the face from her that ended the segment. Moments later, The Undertaker attempted to convince Sara over the phone that he was innocent until it became obvious that Sara was not buying his alibi. Sara also got a call from Lesnar as Lesnar told Sara in a mockingly insincere tone that he was concerned for her state of mind. Toward the end of the show, The Undertaker would vent his frustrations on Lesnar at the end of the evening as he assaulted him, using the cast on his broken hand as a weapon. On the October 17 episode of SmackDown!, The Undertaker admitted in an interview that he lied about not knowing Tracy, and that he knew Tracy, but insisted that it was years before he and Sara even met; however, Tracy begged to differ, and let McMahon know that she and The Undertaker had been together as recently as ten days earlier. Lesnar and Heyman, with their own axe to grind, demanded that McMahon prohibit The Undertaker from wearing his cast during their upcoming match. Intent on exacting vengeance upon Lesnar, The Undertaker attacked Lesnar with the cast, bloodying him in the process. Despite that, McMahon affirmed that The Undertaker would be permitted to wear the cast.

The main rivalry from the Raw brand was between the World Heavyweight Champion Triple H and the WWE Intercontinental Champion Kane, and was part of an ongoing storyline where Raw General Manager Eric Bischoff was seeking to have one overall champion to reign over his roster; to this effect, earlier in 2002, the WWE Hardcore Championship, and the WWE European Championship had been unified with the Intercontinental Championship in separate bouts where Rob Van Dam, the then-reigning champion, defeated European Champion Jeff Hardy and Hardcore Champion Tommy Dreamer.

At Unforgiven, Triple H defeated Rob Van Dam to retain the World Heavyweight Championship. On the September 30 episode of Raw, Bischoff announced that the World Heavyweight and Intercontinental Championships would be at stake in a unification match at No Mercy. Both Triple H and Chris Jericho, the reigning Intercontinental Champion, would defend their titles in matches that night, with the winners advancing to No Mercy. While Triple H was successful in his defense against Bubba Ray Dudley, Jericho was not, losing to Kane. On the October 7 episode of Raw, Kane successfully singlehandedly defended the World Tag Team Championship (that he had won on September 23) in a four team Tables, Ladders, and Chairs match, as The Hurricane had been attacked earlier that evening (by Triple H and Ric Flair), and was thus unable to compete. As Kane celebrated his title defense in the TLC match, Triple H and Flair came out, with Triple H stating that he knew all about Katie Vick, and accused Kane of killing her. On the October 14 episode of Raw, after Kane and Hurricane lost the World Tag Team Championship to Jericho and Christian, Kane addressed the crowd, and admitted that he was somewhat responsible for Vick's death; however, he claimed that it was an accident. According to Kane, he was simply driving her home from a party because she had too much to drink. Triple H soon came out to interrupt. He stated that Kane's story was only partly true, and that Kane apparently forgot to mention that he too had been drinking. In addition, Triple H mentioned that at Katie's autopsy, doctors found traces of Kane's semen, leaving Triple H to accuse Kane of necrophilia. Toward the end of the show, Kane attempted to gain revenge on Triple H as he got to the ring, but Triple H quickly escaped. Kane then attacked half of the Raw roster by Chokeslamming them, and then stared down at Triple H as they were set to square off in their title unification match at No Mercy.

Another predominant rivalry from the Raw brand was between Rob Van Dam and Ric Flair. At Unforgiven, Flair interfered in Van Dam's World Heavyweight Championship match against Triple H. During the match, Triple H tried to attack Van Dam with a sledgehammer, but Flair interfered in the match, and snatched it from Triple H. Flair turned on Van Dam by hitting him with the sledgehammer, and allowed Triple H to win the match. As a result of the betrayal, Flair turned heel. On the September 23 episode of Raw, Triple H and Flair defeated Van Dam and Bubba Ray Dudley in a tag team match. After the match, Van Dam attacked Triple H and performed a Diving Legdrop on Triple H through the announce table. On the October 14 episode of Raw, Eric Bischoff announced that Van Dam would wrestle Flair in a match at No Mercy. Later that night, Triple H defeated Van Dam in a Canadian lumberjack strap match after Ric Flair nailed Van Dam from behind with the World Heavyweight title belt while the referee was distracted.

The secondary rivalry from the SmackDown! brand heading into No Mercy was between the team of Kurt Angle and Chris Benoit and the team of Edge and Rey Mysterio to crown the first-ever WWE Tag Team Champions. SmackDown! General Manager Stephanie McMahon announced that a tag team tournament would take place to determine the new champions for the brand. The tournament started on the October 3 episode of SmackDown!, with the quarterfinals. Los Guerreros (Eddie Guerrero and Chavo Guerrero Jr.) defeated Mark Henry and Rikishi in the first match, and Reverend D-Von and Ron Simmons defeated Billy and Chuck in the second match. The other two matches of the quarterfinal round took place on the October 10 episode of SmackDown!, as Angle and Benoit defeated John Cena and Billy Kidman, in which led to Cena's heel turn after the match, and Edge and Mysterio defeated Brock Lesnar and Tajiri. On the October 17 episode of SmackDown!, the semifinal round took place, where Angle and Benoit defeated Los Guerreros, and Edge and Mysterio defeated D-Von and Simmons. This set up the final round match pitting Angle and Benoit against Edge and Mysterio to crown the new champions at No Mercy.

The third rivalry from the Raw brand heading into the event was between the team of Chris Jericho and Christian and the team of Booker T and Goldust over the World Tag Team Championship. On the September 23 episode of Raw, Jericho defeated Goldust to retain the Intercontinental Championship in a match ordered by the Raw General Manager Eric Bischoff. On the September 30 episode of Raw, Jericho was confronted by Goldust's tag team partner Booker T in a backstage segment. On the October 7 episode of Raw, Booker T defeated Big Show in a Steel Cage match. After the match, Jericho attacked Booker T. On the October 14 episode of Raw, Booker T retaliated by attacking Jericho before Jericho and Christian's World Tag Team Championship match against Kane and The Hurricane. However, Jericho and Christian managed to win the championship. After the match, Bischoff announced that Jericho and Christian would defend the titles against Booker T and Goldust at No Mercy.

The third rivalry from the SmackDown! brand heading into the event was between Jamie Noble and Tajiri over the WWE Cruiserweight Championship. On the October 10 episode of SmackDown!, Noble's valet Nidia was involved in a backstage confrontation with Rey Mysterio, and Noble was not there to support her. She then confronted Noble, enabling the security guard to ask what the problem was. Nidia responded by slapping Noble's water bottle out of his hand onto the guard, prompting him to remove the two from the arena for the night. On that evening, Noble was scheduled to team with Tajiri to take on Edge and Rey Mysterio in the quarterfinals to crown the first-ever WWE Tag Team Champions, but since Noble got removed from the arena, he was replaced by Brock Lesnar in the tag team match. Edge and Mysterio still managed to win the match and advance to the semifinals. On the October 17 episode of SmackDown!, Noble's tag team partner Tajiri served as the special guest referee in a match between Noble and Nidia. Noble won the match. After the match, Tajiri tried to help Nidia to her feet, but she slapped him on the face, enabling Noble to attack Tajiri from behind. As a result, Noble and Nidia kept their alliance. This led to a match between Noble and Tajiri for the Cruiserweight Championship at No Mercy.

The Divas rivalry from the Raw brand heading into the event was between Trish Stratus and Victoria over the WWE Women's Championship. At Unforgiven, Stratus defeated Molly Holly to win the title. On the September 23 episode of Raw, Stratus defeated Molly and Victoria in a Triple Threat match to retain the title. On the September 30 episode of Raw, Victoria attacked Stratus from behind backstage before their title match. Stratus, however, defeated Victoria by disqualification to retain the title after Victoria nailed Stratus with a steel chair. On the October 7 episode of Raw, Victoria attacked Stratus after Stratus retained the title against Stacy Keibler in a Bra and Panties match. This led to a title match between Stratus and Victoria at No Mercy.

The Divas' rivalry from the SmackDown! brand heading into the event was between Torrie Wilson and Dawn Marie. On the September 26 episode of SmackDown!, Wilson defeated Nidia in a Bikini contest via crowd reaction. After the contest ended, Wilson was confronted by Dawn in a backstage segment. On the October 3 episode of SmackDown!, Wilson introduced her father Al Wilson to Billy and Chuck. Dawn started getting affections for Al shortly thereafter. Later that night, Torrie defeated Dawn in a Bikini contest. After the contest ended, Dawn was about to shake Torrie's hand, but instead she slapped her down and tossed her out of the ring. On the October 10 episode of SmackDown!, Torrie defeated Dawn in a Lingerie contest. Afterward, Dawn wanted to shake Torrie's hand this time but Torrie this time declined and walked away as if it looked like she wasn't going to fall for another trick after the assault that happened to her the previous week. Backstage, Dawn continued to attract Al towards herself, which led to a match between Torrie and Dawn at No Mercy. On the October 17 episode of SmackDown!, Dawn and Matt Hardy defeated Torrie and Rikishi in a mixed tag team match. Moments later, Torrie started looking for her dad until she went to the Women's locker room and found him in a shower with Dawn.

== Event ==
Other on-screen personnel
Role:	Name:
English commentators	Jim Ross (Raw)
English commentators	Jerry Lawler (Raw)
English commentators	Michael Cole (SmackDown!)
English commentators	Tazz (SmackDown!)
Spanish commentators	Carlos Cabrera
Spanish commentators	Hugo Savinovich
Interviewer	Jonathan Coachman
Ring announcers	Howard Finkel (Raw)
Ring announcers	Tony Chimel (SmackDown!)
Referees	Charles Robinson
Referees	Mike Chioda
Referees	Nick Patrick
Referees	Jack Doan
Referees	Earl Hebner
Referees	Chad Patton
Referees	Brian Hebner
Referees	Jim Korderas
General managers	Eric Bischoff (Raw)
General managers	Stephanie McMahon (SmackDown!)

Before the event aired live on pay-per-view (PPV), The Hurricane defeated Steven Richards in a match that aired live on Sunday Night Heat.

=== Preliminary matches ===
The first match was for the World Tag Team Championship between defending champions Chris Jericho and Christian against Booker T and Goldust. Goldust and Jericho started the match, but immediately tagged in to Booker T and Christian respectively. Booker T knocked Christian with a punch, and then a clothesline, and started chasing Jericho, but Jericho hopped down from the ring apron. Goldust slingshotted Jericho over the top rope onto Christian and Booker T rolled Jericho back into the ring. Goldust tagged in, and performed a double bulldog on Jericho and Christian, and then performed Golden Globes on Christian, and a drop toe hold on Jericho, knocking him into the groin of Christian in the corner. Goldust followed with a roll-up on Jericho for a near-fall. Goldust attempted the Curtain Call on Jericho, but Jericho avoided the move and applied the Walls of Jericho on Goldust. Booker T broke the hold by kicking Jericho's head. Booker T performed a missile dropkick on Jericho. Christian grabbed a title belt and attempted to hit Booker T with it but Booker T stopped the attempt. Jericho attempted a springboard dropkick, but the middle rope broke. However, Jericho delivered a one-handed bulldog on the title belt on Goldust and performed a Lionsault to retain the title.

The second match of the event was between Torrie Wilson and Dawn Marie. The ring was being repaired during Dawn's entrance, as the middle rope broke down during the previous match. Torrie started the match by attacking Dawn with punches until Dawn left the ring. As Dawn returned to the ring, she started arguing with the referee. Torrie took advantage of the situation and performed a swinging neckbreaker on Dawn to win the match.

The next match was between Rob Van Dam and Ric Flair. As the match started, Van Dam started attacking Flair until Flair escaped out of the ring but Van Dam caught him outside the ring by fighting with punches. The action returned to the ring where Flair applied a figure four leglock on Van Dam. Van Dam tried to reverse the hold but Flair rolled into the ropes to break the hold. Flair attempted to apply the figure four leglock again but Van Dam countered it with a small package for a near-fall. Flair climbed the top rope but Van Dam pulled him down by slamming him in the center of the ring. Van Dam performed a Rolling Thunder on Flair to get a near-fall. Van Dam followed it by performing a Five-Star Frog Splash on Flair for the victory.

The fourth match was for the WWE Cruiserweight Championship. Jamie Noble defended the title against Tajiri. The match started in the aisle when Tajiri attacked Noble. The two continued to battle and their fight reached the ring where Noble dominated Tajiri for much of the earlier match. Tajiri started dominating the match by attempting a moonsault on Noble. However, Noble avoided the move but Tajiri landed on his feet. However, Tajiri performed a Flip Over DDT on Noble. Noble attempted a clothesline but missed it and Tajiri delivered a series of kicks and a superkick for a near-fall. Tajiri followed by applying a Tarantula on Noble and attempted a Buzzsaw Kick but missed the move. However, he slammed Noble's face into the turnbuckle and then performed a Buzzsaw Kick but before he could pin Noble, Noble's manager Nidia climbed the apron and kissed the referee. Noble took advantage and delivered a Gibson Driver to Tajiri for a near-fall. Noble attempted to pin Tajiri with a victory roll. Nidia helped Noble in pinning Tajiri to retain the title. After the match, Tajiri delivered a Buzzsaw Kick to Noble.

The fifth match of the event was the title unification match for Triple H's World Heavyweight Championship and Kane's WWE Intercontinental Championship. Midway through the match, Kane performed a back body drop on Triple H and attempted a pinfall on Triple H but Ric Flair ran into the ring and went after Kane. Flair got Kane out of the ring and Triple H went back to fight Kane in the ring. The Hurricane then ran down to the ringside area and prevented Flair from interfering in the match. This distracted Triple H and he performed a Pedigree on Hurricane. Kane performed a powerslam on Triple H for a near-fall. Kane attempted a big boot on Triple H but he avoided the move and the referee was knocked down. Triple H and Kane fought outside the ring, where Kane chokeslammed Triple H through a broadcast table. Flair tried to attack Kane outside the ring but Kane shoved him and took Triple H with him back into the ring to pin him. Flair ran into the ring with a sledgehammer and tried to attack Kane with it but Kane grabbed it from Flair and hit him with it. After knocking out Flair, Kane focused on Triple H and tried to hit him with it, but Triple H low blowed Kane and took the weapon. Triple H attempted to hit Kane with the sledgehammer but Kane avoided the move, delivered a chokeslam to Triple H, and attempted to pin him, but the referee was still out. A new referee came in to make the count, but Flair pulled him out to prevent the pinfall. Flair then climbed the top rope to distract Kane but Kane performed a chokeslam on Flair. Triple H took advantage and performed a Pedigree on a Kane to retain the World Heavyweight Championship and unify Kane's Intercontinental Championship into the World Heavyweight Championship.

The sixth match was a tag team match to determine the first-ever WWE Tag Team Champions. Kurt Angle and Chris Benoit wrestled Edge and Rey Mysterio for the titles. Midway through the match, Benoit climbed the top rope and attempted a diving headbutt on Edge but Edge avoided the move and tagged Mysterio. Mysterio ran into the ring and used his quick speed, knocking Angle off the ring apron and then Mysterio dropkicked Benoit in the face. Mysterio followed by Droppin Da' Dime on Benoit. Benoit applied the Crippler Crossface on Mysterio but Mysterio escaped the hold by slamming Benoit into the middle rope and attempted a 619 but Benoit countered. Edge attacked Benoit and Mysterio attempted to pin, but Benoit kicked out. Later, Edge attacked Benoit in the corner and Mysterio performed a bronco buster on Benoit. Edge performed a hurricanrana on Angle. Benoit attempted a diving headbutt on Edge but Edge avoided the move and Angle received it. Edge took advantage and pinned Angle for a near-fall. Mysterio entered the ring and kicked Angle in the face. Benoit applied a Crippler Crossface on Edge from behind but Edge knocked Benoit out of the ring and tossed Mysterio onto Benoit outside the ring. Angle attempted to apply an ankle lock on Edge, but Edge countered it and applied the ankle lock on Angle instead. Angle countered the hold and applied his own ankle lock on Edge, making him submit. As a result, Angle and Benoit became the first-ever WWE Tag Team Champions. The match was later named Match of the Year by Wrestling Observer Newsletter.

The final match on the undercard was for the WWE Women's Championship in which Trish Stratus defended the title against Victoria. Stratus and Victoria started the match in the ring and they quickly fought to the outside. Trish clotheslined Victoria but Victoria fought back and slammed Stratus on the guardrail. Back in the ring, Victoria performed a Diving Legdrop on Stratus. In the end, Victoria made a pinfall attempt on Stratus but Stratus countered it and pinned Victoria with a roll-up to win the match and retain the title. After the match, Victoria assaulted Stratus until the referee stopped her.

=== Main event match ===
The main event was a Hell in a Cell match for the WWE Championship involving Brock Lesnar defending the title against The Undertaker. During the match, The Undertaker attacked Lesnar with his cast, causing Lesnar to bleed. Lesnar eventually started focusing on The Undertaker's injured hand but The Undertaker fought back. The Undertaker was distracted by Lesnar's manager Paul Heyman. The Undertaker grabbed Heyman's tie through the cage and pulled him repeatedly into the cell wall, causing Heyman to bleed. Lesnar took advantage of the distraction and started fighting The Undertaker. He backed The Undertaker into the wall of the cell and worked on the injured hand. He slammed his hand repeatedly and then tried to remove the cast. The Undertaker attacked Lesnar and prevented him from removing the cast. Lesnar continued his attempt to remove the cast. He kicked The Undertaker's injured hand, which allowed Lesnar to remove the cast. Lesnar focused on The Undertaker's injured hand and continued to attack it until The Undertaker low-blowed Lesnar. Lesnar delivered a DDT to The Undertaker. Lesnar went to the outside of the ring. The Undertaker attempted a suicide dive on Lesnar but Lesnar avoided the move and The Undertaker collided with the cell wall. Lesnar hit The Undertaker with the steel steps, causing The Undertaker to bleed profusely. Lesnar performed a spinebuster on The Undertaker for a near-fall. The Undertaker attempted Old School but Lesnar countered. The Undertaker performed a chokeslam on Lesnar for a near-fall. Lesnar then tried to mock The Undertaker by performing The Undertaker's own finisher on him, a Last Ride, but The Undertaker countered with a back body drop. The Undertaker attempted a Last Ride but Lesnar slammed The Undertaker into the turnbuckle. Lesnar delivered mounted punches on The Undertaker but The Undertaker performed a Last Ride and attempted to pin Lesnar, but Lesnar put his hand on the rope, avoiding the pin. The Undertaker attempted a Tombstone Piledriver but Lesnar countered and performed an F-5 to win the match and retain the WWE Championship.

== Aftermath ==
=== Raw ===
After losing to Triple H in the title unification match at No Mercy, Kane continued his rivalry with Triple H. On the October 21 episode of Raw, Kane and Rob Van Dam defeated Triple H and Ric Flair in a tag team match. After the match, Kane and Triple H continued to brawl with each other. On the next episode of Raw, Raw General Manager Eric Bischoff announced that the first-ever Elimination Chamber match would take place at Survivor Series, and Triple H's World Heavyweight Championship would be on the line in the match. Kane, Shawn Michaels, Chris Jericho, Booker T, and Van Dam were announced as the other participants of the match. Later that night, Kane defeated Triple H in a casket match after Michaels interfered. At Survivor Series, Michaels defeated Triple H, Booker T, Van Dam, Jericho, and Kane in the Elimination Chamber match to win the World Heavyweight Championship.

The Intercontinental Championship would be retired until Judgment Day 2003, where it was reactivated by co-Raw general manager "Stone Cold" Steve Austin.

=== SmackDown ===
On the October 24 episode of SmackDown!, the show's newest acquisition Big Show challenged Brock Lesnar for the WWE Championship at Survivor Series. Later that night, The Undertaker cut a promo, and showed his respect for Lesnar on their Hell in a Cell match at No Mercy. However, the promo was interrupted by Big Show, who attacked The Undertaker, and injured him by throwing him off the stage. Lesnar's manager Paul Heyman continuously advised Lesnar to get out of the title match against Big Show at Survivor Series because Heyman thought that Lesnar could not defeat Big Show, but Lesnar intended to wrestle Big Show. At Survivor Series, Big Show defeated Lesnar to win the WWE Championship, after Heyman betrayed Lesnar, and helped Big Show win the title.

=== Future ===
While the 2002 No Mercy featured wrestlers from both Raw and SmackDown!, until the 2007 event, the following year's event was produced exclusively for SmackDown!.

== Results ==
No.	Results	Stipulations	Times
1^{H}	The Hurricane defeated Steven Richards	Singles match	3:05
2	Chris Jericho and Christian (c) defeated Booker T and Goldust	Tag team match for the World Tag Team Championship	8:46
3	Torrie Wilson defeated Dawn Marie	Singles match	4:40
4	Rob Van Dam defeated Ric Flair	Singles match	7:59
5	Jamie Noble (c) (with Nidia) defeated Tajiri	Singles match for the WWE Cruiserweight Championship	8:15
6	Triple H (World Heavyweight) defeated Kane (Intercontinental)	Unification match for the World Heavyweight and WWE Intercontinental Championships	16:13
7	Kurt Angle and Chris Benoit defeated Edge and Rey Mysterio	Tag team match for the inaugural WWE Tag Team Championship	22:03
8	Trish Stratus (c) defeated Victoria	Singles match for the WWE Women's Championship	5:32
9	Brock Lesnar (c) (with Paul Heyman) defeated The Undertaker	Hell in a Cell match for the WWE Championship	27:18
(c) / – the champion(s) heading into the match; H / – the match was broadcast prior to the pay-per-view on Sunday Night Heat

=== Inaugural WWE Tag Team Championship Tournament ===
1st Round; SmackDown! October 1–8, 2002 (Aired: October 3–10)
Los Guerreros (Chavo Guerrero and Eddie Guerrero)	Submission
Mark Henry and Rikishi	5:16
Chris Benoit and Kurt Angle	Submission
Billy Kidman and John Cena	7:51
Reverend D-Von and Ron Simmons	Pinfall
Billy and Chuck (Billy Gunn and Chuck Palumbo)	4:07
Edge and Rey Mysterio	Pinfall
Brock Lesnar and Tajiri	7:23

Semifinals; SmackDown! October 15, 2002 (Aired: October 17)
Los Guerreros	10:45
Chris Benoit and Kurt Angle	Pinfall
Reverend D-Von and Ron Simmons	4:40
Edge and Rey Mysterio	Pinfall

Final; No Mercy; October 20, 2002
Chris Benoit and Kurt Angle	Submission
Edge and Rey Mysterio	22:01
