= Survivor Series (2002) =

World Wrestling Entertainment pay-per-view event

- Promotional poster featuring Rob Van Dam
- Promotion: World Wrestling Entertainment
- Brand(s): Raw; SmackDown!
- Date: November 17, 2002
- City: New York City, New York
- Venue: Madison Square Garden
- Attendance: 17,930
- Buy rate: 340,000

Pay-per-view chronology
← Previous; Rebellion	Next → Armageddon

Survivor Series chronology
← Previous; 2001	Next → 2003

The 2002 Survivor Series was a professional wrestling pay-per-view (PPV) event produced by World Wrestling Entertainment (WWE), held for wrestlers from the promotion's Raw and SmackDown! brand divisions. It was the 16th annual Survivor Series and took place on November 17, 2002, from Madison Square Garden in the New York City borough of Manhattan, New York. The event centered on WWE's first-ever Elimination Chamber match, a type of roofed steel cage that surrounds the ring and ringside area with no disqualifications and the objective is to eliminate all other opponents either by pinfall or submission. As a result, this was the second Survivor Series to not include the titular Survivor Series match, after the 1998 event.

This was the first Survivor Series held under the WWE name, after the promotion was renamed from World Wrestling Federation (WWF) to WWE in May, and also the first Survivor Series held under the first brand split that was introduced in March. This was also the second Survivor Series held at Madison Square Garden, after the 1996 event. The official theme song was "Always" by Saliva, who performed the song and Chris Jericho's entrance music live from The World.

The main event from the Raw brand was the first-ever Elimination Chamber match, which was a men's match for the World Heavyweight Championship involving reigning champion Triple H, Shawn Michaels, Chris Jericho, Booker T, Rob Van Dam, and Kane. Michaels won the match after last eliminating Triple H. The predominant match on the SmackDown! brand was for the WWE Championship, in which Big Show defeated Brock Lesnar to win the title. The featured match on the undercard was a triple threat elimination tag team match for SmackDown!'s WWE Tag Team Championship involving Edge and Rey Mysterio, Los Guerreros (Eddie Guerrero and Chavo Guerrero), and Kurt Angle and Chris Benoit. Los Guerreros won the title after last eliminating Edge and Mysterio.

== Production ==
=== Background ===
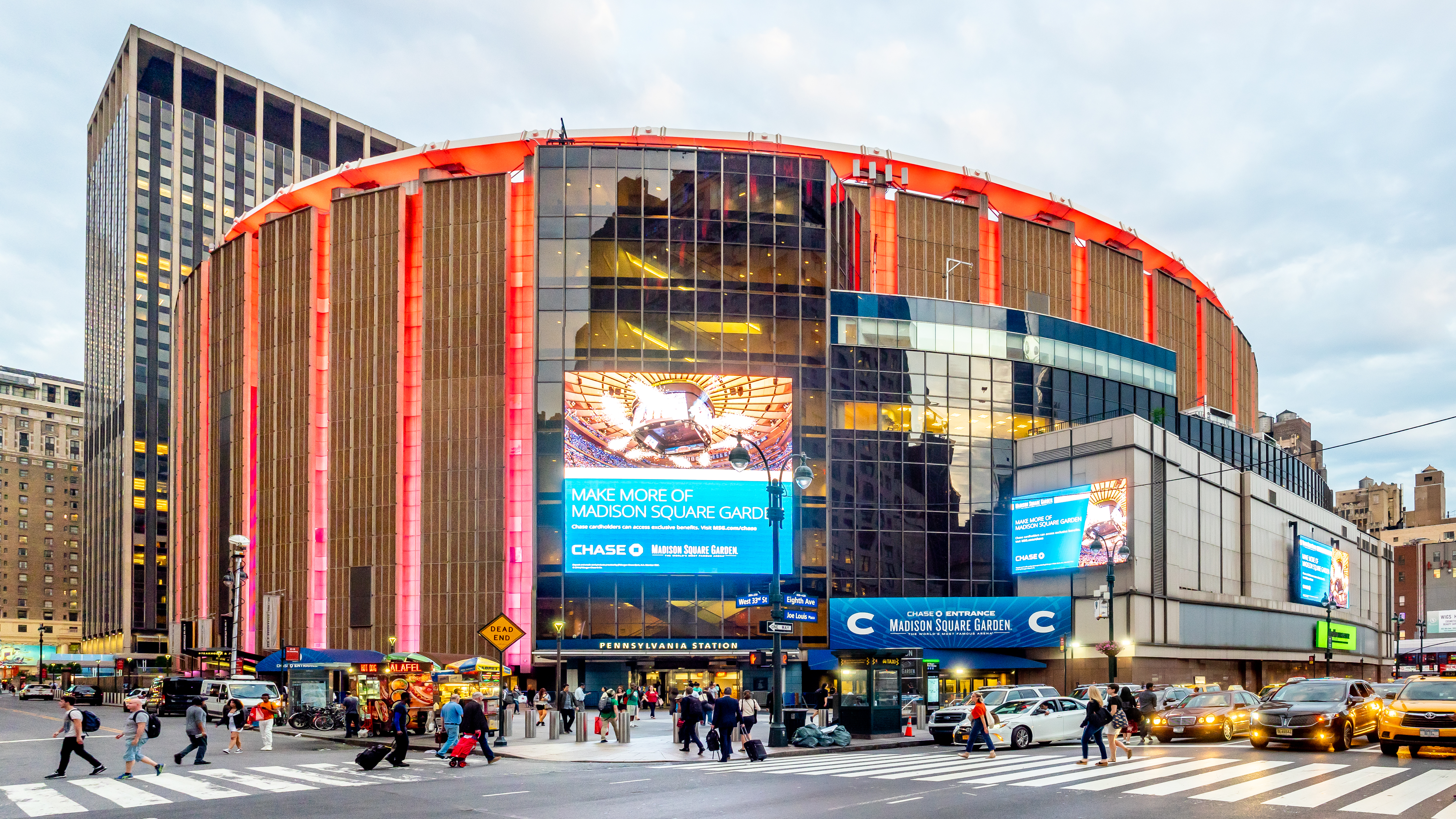
This was the second Survivor Series held at Madison Square Garden in New York City, New York, after the 1996 event.

Survivor Series is an annual professional wrestling pay-per-view (PPV) event, produced every November by World Wrestling Entertainment (WWE) since 1987, generally held around Thanksgiving in the United States. In what has become the second longest-running pay-per-view event in history (behind WWE's WrestleMania), it is one of the promotion's original four pay-per-views, along with WrestleMania, SummerSlam, and Royal Rumble, referred to as the "Big Four", and was considered one of the "Big Five" PPVs with the addition of King of the Ring in 1993 until it was discontinued as an annual PPV after its 2002 event in June. The 16th Survivor Series event was scheduled to be held on November 17, 2002, from Madison Square Garden in the New York City borough of Manhattan, New York. This was the second Survivor Series at Madison Square Garden, after the 1996 event. The official theme song of the event was "Always" by Saliva. The band performed the song and Chris Jericho's entrance music live from The World.

The event is traditionally characterized by having Survivor Series matches, which are tag team elimination matches that typically pits teams of four or five wrestlers against each other. The 2002 event, however, did not feature such match, and was the second time a Survivor Series match did not occur at the titular event, after the 1998 event. In place of the Survivor Series match, the 2002 event included the first-ever Elimination Chamber match—a six-man elimination match inside of a steel structure—in addition to an elimination tables match and a triple threat elimination tag team match.

This was the first Survivor Series to be held under the first brand extension introduced in March, which split the roster between the Raw and SmackDown! brands where wrestlers were exclusively assigned to perform; Survivor Series featured wrestlers from both brands. It was also the first Survivor Series held under the WWE name, following the renaming of the company from World Wrestling Federation (WWF) to WWE in May. It was also the first Survivor Series to feature the World Heavyweight Championship, following its introduction on Raw in September after the WWE Undisputed Championship became exclusive to SmackDown! and renamed to WWE Championship.

=== Storylines ===
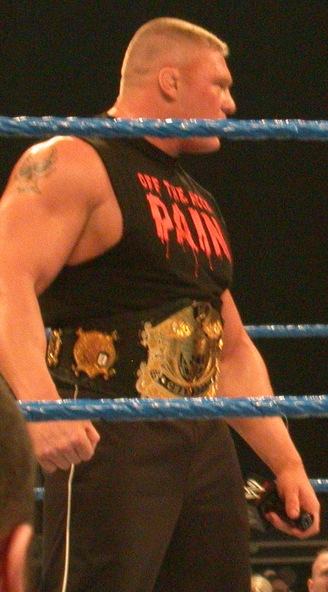
Brock Lesnar as SmackDown!'s WWE Champion.

The event featured seven professional wrestling matches with outcomes predetermined by WWE script writers. The matches featured wrestlers portraying their characters in planned storylines that took place before, during, and after the event. All wrestlers were from one of WWE's brands – Raw and SmackDown! – while storylines played out on their weekly television shows, Raw and SmackDown!.

==== World championship matches ====
The main feud heading into Survivor Series on the Raw brand was between Triple H, Rob Van Dam, Booker T, Kane, Chris Jericho, and Shawn Michaels over the World Heavyweight Championship. The feud started on the September 2 episode of Raw when Raw General Manager Eric Bischoff awarded Triple H the World Heavyweight Championship in the form of the Big Gold Belt. Later on that episode, Triple H successfully defended the title over Ric Flair but lost in a tag team match to both Ric Flair and Rob Van Dam towards the end of the show. On the September 9 episode of Raw, Rob Van Dam became the number one contender to the World Heavyweight Championship by defeating Chris Jericho, Jeff Hardy, and Big Show in a fatal four-way elimination match. On the September 16 episode of Raw, Van Dam lost the WWE Intercontinental Championship to Chris Jericho after interference by Triple H. At Unforgiven, Van Dam faced Triple H for the World Heavyweight Championship, which he lost after Ric Flair hit him with the sledgehammer, allowing Triple H to finish him off with the pedigree, thus retaining the title. On the September 30 episode of Raw, Triple H defeated Bubba Ray Dudley to retain the World Heavyweight Championship. Later that night, Kane won the Intercontinental Championship from Jericho despite interference from Triple H and Ric Flair. The match was made between Triple H and Kane for No Mercy in which both Kane's Intercontinental Championship and Triple H's World Heavyweight Championship were at stake. On the October 7 episode of Raw, Kane successfully singlehandedly defended the World Tag Team Championship (that he had won on September 23) in a four team Tables, Ladders, and Chairs match as The Hurricane had been attacked earlier that evening (by Triple H and Ric Flair) and was thus unable to compete. On the October 14 episode of Raw, Kane and The Hurricane lost the tag titles to Christian and Jericho. Later that night, Triple H defeated Van Dam in a Canadian lumberjack strap match after Ric Flair nailed Van Dam from behind with the World title belt while the referee was distracted. At No Mercy, Triple H went on to defeat Kane in the title unification match, winning the Intercontinental Championship and unifying it with the World Heavyweight Championship. On the October 21 episode of Raw, Raw General Manager Eric Bischoff announced that the first ever Elimination Chamber match would take place at Survivor Series. Bischoff did this, as he wanted the Elimination Chamber match to be better than SmackDown!'s Hell in a Cell match at No Mercy. On the October 28 episode of Raw, Bischoff stated that the Elimination Chamber would be a combination of WWE's Royal Rumble, Survivor Series, and WCW's War Games matches, in that a countdown timer comes from the Royal Rumble and War Games, the enclosed cage format from War Games, and the elimination process from the Royal Rumble and Survivor Series. Bischoff also added that the match will involve six superstars. This led to Bischoff revealing the six participants for the contest; Triple H, Chris Jericho, Booker T, Rob Van Dam, Kane and Shawn Michaels. Later that night, when Triple H took on Kane in a Casket match, Shawn Michaels (who Triple H put out of action after their Unsanctioned Street Fight at SummerSlam) emerged from the casket and assaulted Triple H. To gain further payback, Michaels then nailed him with the Sweet Chin Music, allowing Kane to put Triple H in the casket and close the lid to win the match. On the November 4 episode of Raw, Booker T and Kane defeated Triple H and Jericho in a tag team match after Michaels interfered again. Afterwards, Michaels accepted the offer of being part of the Elimination Chamber match.

The main feud on the SmackDown! brand was between Brock Lesnar and Big Show over the WWE Championship. At No Mercy, Lesnar defeated The Undertaker in a Hell in a Cell match to retain the title, pinning him after an F-5. On the October 24 episode of SmackDown!, Big Show was traded to the SmackDown! brand and immediately issued a challenge to Lesnar, who accepted later that night. Later that night, after Lesnar and The Undertaker cut promos to one another, Big Show threw The Undertaker off the stage, thus injuring his neck. On the October 31 episode of SmackDown!, Lesnar faced off against Rey Mysterio, which ended in a no contest after Big Show interfered and tossed Mysterio into the crowd. Shortly after the match ended, Big Show chokeslammed Lesnar through the announce table. On the November 7 episode of SmackDown!, after Lesnar defeated Eddie Guerrero in a non-title match, Big Show attacked Lesnar and slammed him off the stage. On the November 14 episode of SmackDown!, Lesnar's manager Paul Heyman was convinced more than anyone that Lesnar could not win, trying to talk him out of defending the title. Lesnar refused and decided to call Big Show to the ring. As Big Show came out, Lesnar drove him through the steel steps. Moments later, Lesnar took out Big Show with five chair shots then nailed him with the championship belt.

==== Undercard matches ====
The other main feud on the card was between three tag teams, Kurt Angle and Chris Benoit, Edge and Rey Mysterio, and Los Guerreros (Eddie and Chavo Guerrero), over the WWE Tag Team Championship. On the October 3 episode of SmackDown!, General Manager, Stephanie McMahon announced an eight team tournament to determine the inaugural WWE Tag Team Champions that would conclude at No Mercy. Los Guerreros defeated Rikishi and Mark Henry in the first quarterfinal round. On the October 10 episode of SmackDown!, in the second quarterfinal round, Kurt Angle and Chris Benoit defeated John Cena and Billy Kidman while Edge and Rey Mysterio defeated Brock Lesnar and Tajiri to advance to the semifinals. On the October 17 episode of SmackDown!, Edge and Mysterio defeated Reverend D-Von and Ron Simmons to advance to the finals. Later, Angle and Benoit advanced to the finals by defeating Los Guerreros. At No Mercy, Angle and Benoit defeated Edge and Mysterio in the finals to become the first WWE Tag Team Champions. On the October 24 episode of SmackDown!, Edge and Rey Mysterio defeated Los Guerreros in a number one contenders tag match to earn a shot at the tag titles. Later that night, the WWE Tag Team Champions, Kurt Angle and Chris Benoit fought each other in an Unforgiven rematch, which Benoit won after interference from Los Guerreros. On the October 31 episode of SmackDown!, both Benoit and Angle cost one another their matches. Angle helped Edge defeat Benoit then later that night, Benoit returned the favor by helping Eddie Guerrero defeat Angle. Afterwards, Angle and Benoit brawled at the Halloween party, ending with Angle delivering an Angle slam and Benoit bashing the bottle into Angle's head at the same time, knocking each other down. On the November 7 episode of SmackDown!, Angle and Benoit lost the WWE Tag Team Championship to Edge and Mysterio in a two out of three falls match after Edge pinned Angle in the third and final fall.

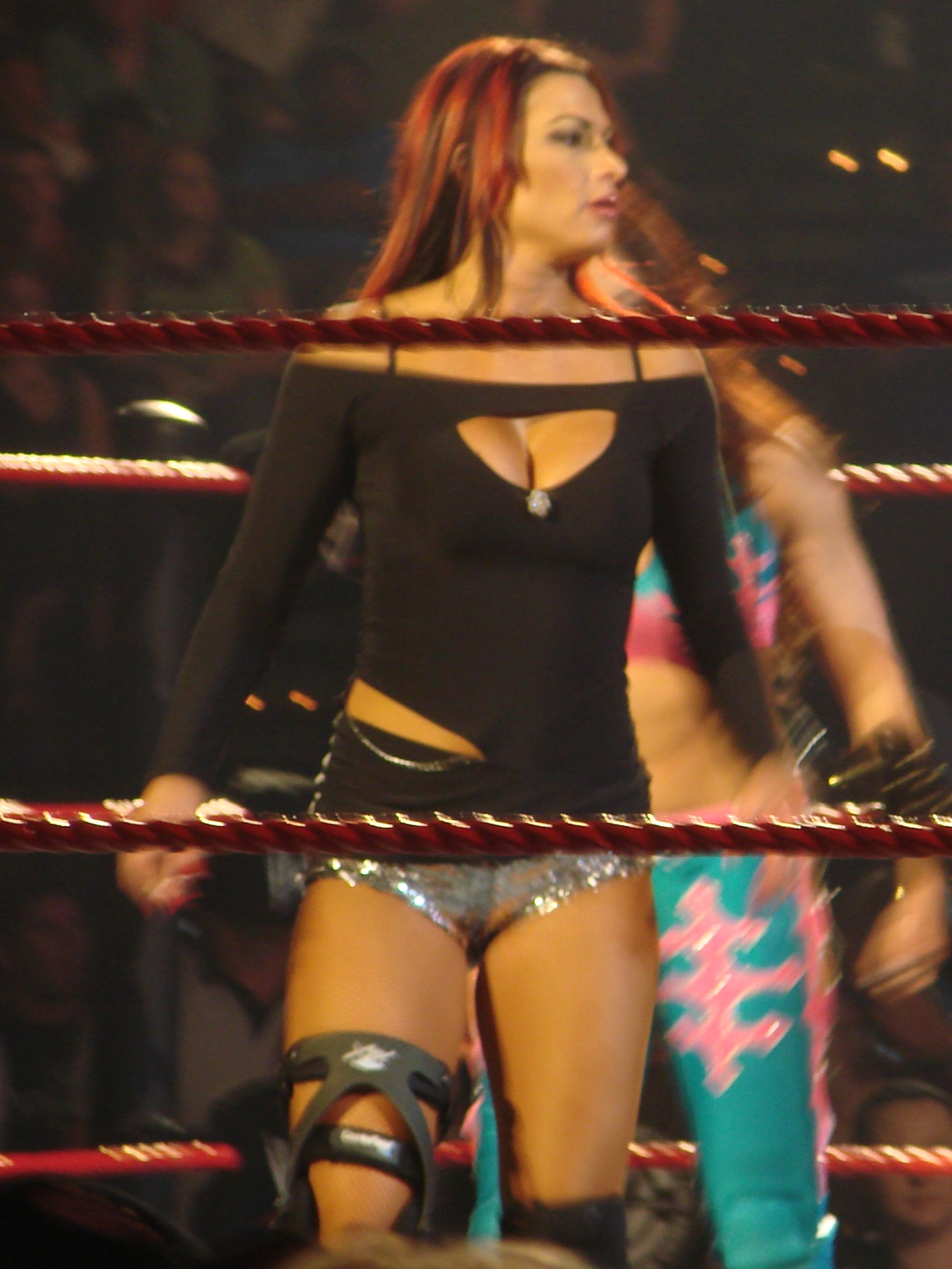
Victoria faced Trish Stratus for Raw's WWE Women's Championship

Another feud coming from the Raw brand was between Victoria and Trish Stratus for the WWE Women's Championship. At Unforgiven, Trish Stratus had captured her third Women's Championship from Victoria's mentor Molly Holly (who Trish lost the title to at King of the Ring). On the September 23 episode of Raw, Stratus successfully defended the Women's title against both Molly Holly and Victoria in a triple threat match. Then on the September 30 episode of Raw, Victoria challenged Stratus for the Women's title in a one-on-one contest but got disqualified after hitting Stratus with a steel chair. On the October 7 episode of Raw, after Stratus defeated Stacy Keibler in a Bra and Panties/Paddle on a Pole match, Victoria attacked Stratus and performed a Moonsault on her. Victoria claimed in the interview that back in their days as fitness models, WWE wanted both of them but Trish stole her spot. The two fought again for the Women's Championship at No Mercy with Stratus retaining. For the following four weeks, the two would have many clashes on Raw including on the November 11 episode of Raw, when Stratus ambushed Victoria following Victoria's attack on Terri Runnels. It was announced that the title would be put on the line in a hardcore rules match.

On the November 7 episode of SmackDown!, Billy Kidman and Torrie Wilson defeated the WWE Cruiserweight Champion Jamie Noble and Nidia in a mixed tag team match after Kidman pinned Noble. The following week on SmackDown!, Kidman pinned Noble for the second consecutive time in a non-title match, handing Noble, his first singles loss in WWE. This led to a match between the two for the Cruiserweight Championship at Survivor Series.

== Event ==
=== Preliminary matches ===
Other on-screen personnel
Role:	Name:
English commentators	Jim Ross (Raw)
English commentators	Jerry Lawler (Raw)
English commentators	Michael Cole (SmackDown)
English commentators	Taz (SmackDown)
Spanish commentators	Carlos Cabrera
Spanish commentators	Hugo Savinovich
Interviewers	Jonathan Coachman
Interviewers	Terri Runnels
Ring announcer	Howard Finkel (Raw)
Ring announcer	Tony Chimel (SmackDown)
Referees	Charles Robinson (Raw)
Referees	Nick Patrick (Raw)
Referees	Earl Hebner (Raw)
Referees	Mike Chioda (SmackDown)
Referees	Jim Korderas (SmackDown)
Referees	Brian Hebner (SmackDown)
Referees	Jack Doan (Raw)
Referees	Mike Sparks (SmackDown)
Referees	Chad Patton (Raw)

Before the event aired live on pay-per-view, The Un-Americans (Lance Storm and William Regal) defeated Goldust and The Hurricane in a tag team match that aired on Sunday Night Heat which was originally advertised to be on the main card.

The first match of the event was an Elimination Tables match as Jeff Hardy and The Dudley Boyz (Bubba Ray and Spike) faced 3-Minute Warning (Rosey and Jamal) and Rico. Spike was eliminated first as Rosey and Jamal performed a Double Flapjack on him. Rosey was next to go, as he was eliminated by Jeff Hardy with a Swanton Bomb. A miscue was picked up on the audio, as Rico was supposed to be knocked off the top rope, by Hardy, and Rico could be heard yelling in frustration "Come on Jeff, goddammit!" With Hardy lying on the ground, outside of the ring, the remaining 3-Minute Warning member, Jamal, delivered a diving splash off the top rope through a table on Hardy, eliminating Hardy from the match. At this point it was down to Jamal and Rico against Bubba Ray. As Bubba Ray fought for his team, he eliminated Jamal after performing a Top-Rope Powerbomb. D-Von Dudley appeared, and along with Bubba Ray, they performed the 3D onto Rico for the win.

The next match was for the WWE Cruiserweight Championship, with reigning champion Jamie Noble taking on Billy Kidman. Nidia accompanied Noble to the ring, and interfered with many parts of the match, including slapping Kidman across the face. Noble went after Kidman, but missed, and knocked Nidia off the apron. Kidman managed to hit the Shooting star press for the win. Billy Kidman was named Cruiserweight Champion.

The third match was for the WWE Women's Championship. It was a Hardcore match with reigning champion Trish Stratus taking on Victoria. Victoria choked Trish with a broomstick at the turnbuckle and hit her with a trash can lid. Trish recovered, and sent Victoria into an ironing board before hitting her several times with a Singapore cane. Victoria (with a bloody nose), went under the ring, and came back out with a fire extinguisher. Victoria sprayed Trish with the extinguisher and gave her a suplex, capturing the Women's title.

The fourth match was the match between Brock Lesnar and Big Show for the WWE Championship. Lesnar came into the match with injured ribs, which Big Show took advantage of earlier into the match. However, Lesnar gained control over Big Show and executed an F-5 but Lesnar's manager Paul Heyman pulled the referee out of the ring. Big Show hit Lesnar in the ribs with a chair, chokeslammed Lesnar onto it and pinned Lesnar, winning the match and the WWE Championship.

The final match on the undercard was a triple threat elimination match for the WWE Tag Team Championship between the teams of Edge and Rey Mysterio, Los Guerreros (Eddie and Chavo), and Kurt Angle and Chris Benoit. A back and forth match between the three teams, until Edge delivered a Spear to Benoit, eliminating the team of Angle and Benoit. The final elimination was the team of Edge and Mysterio, when Eddie forced Mysterio to submit to the Lasso from El Paso, thus Los Guerreros winning the match and the WWE Tag Team Championship. After the match, Scott Steiner made his return to WWE, and attacked Christopher Nowinski and Matt Hardy after they had given an insulting promo about New York City and its citizens.

=== Main event match ===
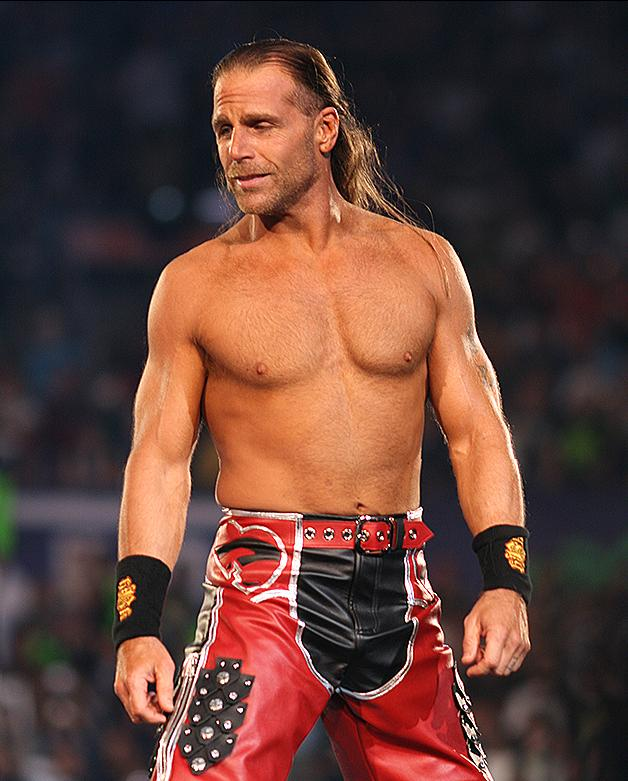
Shawn Michaels won Raw's World Heavyweight Championship by last eliminating defending champion Triple H in WWE's first-ever Elimination Chamber match

The main event was the first-ever Elimination Chamber match for the World Heavyweight Championship between Triple H, Rob Van Dam, Kane, Chris Jericho, Booker T, and Shawn Michaels. Ric Flair accompanied Triple H. The match started off with Triple H facing off against Van Dam, while the remaining four superstars were locked in the four chambers. Superstars entered the match at five-minute intervals. Van Dam controlled much of the beginning against Triple H. The next entrant was Jericho. Jericho and Triple H doubled teamed Van Dam until the next entrant entered. The fourth entrant, Booker T then made his way into the match. Van Dam delivered a Five Star Frog Splash onto Triple H off the top of a pod, legitimately damaging Triple H's throat. Booker T would capitalize on this and delivered a Missile Dropkick to Van Dam to eliminate him from the match. However, Booker T would be the next elimination after Jericho pinned him following a Lionsault. The fifth entrant, Kane, dominated upon his entry into the match. The sixth entrant, Michaels, experienced brief control only to be chokeslammed by Kane. However, Kane would be the third elimination after receiving a Superkick from Michaels, a Pedigree from Triple H, and finally a Lionsault from Jericho. Jericho would be the next elimination after Michaels pinned him following Sweet Chin Music. The final elimination was made when Michaels delivered Sweet Chin Music to Triple H and pinned him, thus winning the match and the World Heavyweight Championship. The show ended with Michaels embracing his newly won championship inside the chamber as confetti dropped to end the event.

== Reception ==
In 2015, Kevin Pantoja of 411Mania gave the event a rating of 9.0 [Amazing], writing, "I remembered how great SummerSlam was but forgot how good Survivor Series was. The worst rating I gave out was just under three stars. Every single match was at the very least fun and we got all new Champions which is always intriguing. Seriously, one of the better shows I've reviewed and one of the best Survivor Series Pay-Per-Views." Maxwell Jacob Friedman stated watching the event live inspired him to want to become a world champion.

== Aftermath ==
=== Raw ===
Shawn Michaels and Triple H continued their feud over the World Heavyweight Championship. On the November 25 episode of Raw, Michaels defended the World Heavyweight Championship against Rob Van Dam; however, Michaels retained the title by disqualification when Triple H attacked Van Dam. The following week on Raw, Van Dam faced off against Triple H, with Michaels as special guest referee, to determine the number one contender to the World Heavyweight Championship at Armageddon. Triple H defeated Van Dam to become the number one contender, and he and Michaels brawled with one another. The next week, on the December 9 episode of Raw, Michaels attacked Triple H and Ric Flair with an iron shovel outside the arena. Michaels then smashed Triple H with a trash can, causing him to fall inside a dumpster. Shortly after, Michaels climbed to the top of a trailer and jumped off onto Triple H. At Armageddon, Triple H defeated Michaels in a Three Stages of Hell match to win the title. The first match was a Street fight, which Triple H won. The match that followed was a Steel Cage match, which Michaels won. The third and final match was a ladder match, which was won by Triple H.

=== SmackDown ===
The following month, at Armageddon, Kurt Angle defeated Big Show to end his near one-month reign as WWE Champion. At the Royal Rumble, in January 2003, Angle defeated Chris Benoit to retain the title, and Brock Lesnar won the Royal Rumble match by last eliminating The Undertaker. Lesnar went on to defeat Angle for the WWE Championship two months later at WrestleMania XIX, pinning him after an F-5. Two months later, at Judgment Day, Lesnar defeated Big Show in a Stretcher match to retain the WWE Championship. Later that year, at Vengeance, Angle defeated Lesnar and Big Show in a No Disqualification triple threat match to become the new WWE Champion. Angle won the match after pinning Lesnar following an Angle Slam. Angle went on to defeat Lesnar and retain the WWE Championship the next month at SummerSlam, forcing him to submit with the Ankle lock. Lesnar then regained the WWE Championship from Angle on the September 18 episode of SmackDown!, in an Iron Man match winning 5-4.

== Results ==
No.	Results	Stipulations	Times
1^{H}	The Un-Americans (Lance Storm and William Regal) defeated Goldust and The Hurricane by pinfall	Tag team match	3:01
2	Jeff Hardy and The Dudley Boyz (Bubba Ray and Spike) defeated 3-Minute Warning (Rosey and Jamal) and Rico	Elimination Tables match	13:55
3	Billy Kidman defeated Jamie Noble (c) (with Nidia) by pinfall	Singles match for the WWE Cruiserweight Championship	7:28
4	Victoria defeated Trish Stratus (c) by pinfall	Hardcore match for the WWE Women's Championship	7:00
5	Big Show defeated Brock Lesnar (c) (with Paul Heyman) by pinfall	Singles match for the WWE Championship	4:18
6	Los Guerreros (Eddie and Chavo) defeated Edge and Rey Mysterio (c) and Kurt Angle and Chris Benoit	Triple threat elimination match for the WWE Tag Team Championship	19:23
7	Shawn Michaels defeated Triple H (c) (with Ric Flair), Chris Jericho, Kane, Booker T, and Rob Van Dam	Elimination Chamber match for the World Heavyweight Championship	39:20
(c) / – the champion(s) heading into the match; H / – the match was broadcast prior to the pay-per-view on Sunday Night Heat

=== Elimination tables match eliminations ===
Eliminated	Wrestler	Eliminated by	Time
1	Spike Dudley	Jamal & Rosey	4:25
2	Rosey	Jeff Hardy	7:59
3	Jeff Hardy	Jamal	10:45
4	Jamal	Bubba Ray Dudley	11:44
5	Rico	Bubba Ray Dudley & D-Von Dudley*	13:55

- D-Von Dudley didn't participate in the match but interfered and helped Bubba Ray Dudley eliminate Rico to win the match

=== Triple threat elimination match eliminations ===
Eliminated	Tag Team	Eliminated by	Time
1	Chris Benoit and Kurt Angle	Edge	13:06
2	Edge and Rey Mysterio	Eddie Guerrero	19:23

=== Elimination Chamber entrances and eliminations ===
Eliminated	Wrestler	Entered	Eliminated by	Method	Times
1	Rob Van Dam	2	Booker T	Pinfall	13:37
2	Booker T	4	Chris Jericho	Pinfall	17:40
3	Kane	5	Chris Jericho	Pinfall	22:53
4	Chris Jericho	3	Shawn Michaels	Pinfall	30:43
5	Triple H (c)	1	Shawn Michaels	Pinfall	39:20
Winner	Shawn Michaels	6			39:20
