= Maria Kanellis =

American professional wrestler, manager, singer and model (born 1982)

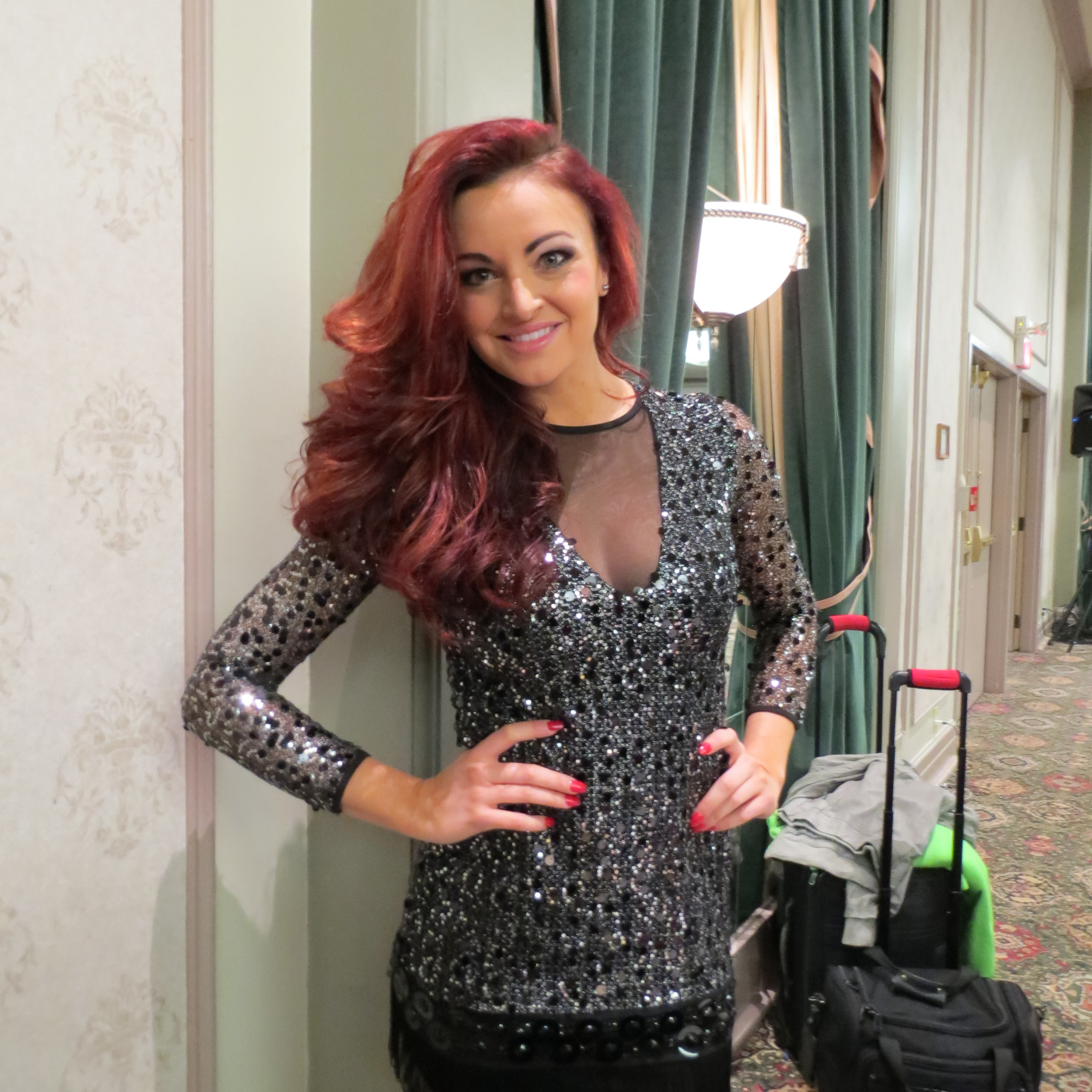
- Kanellis in 2012

Personal information
- Born: Mary Louis Kanellis; February 25, 1982 (age 44) Ottawa, Illinois, U.S.
- Education: Northern Illinois University; Johnson & Wales University
- Spouse: Mike Bennett (m. 2014)
- Children: 3

Professional wrestling career
- Ring name(s): Maria; Maria Kanellis; Maria Kanellis-Bennett
- Billed height: 5 ft 7 in (1.70 m)
- Billed weight: 120 lb (54 kg)
- Billed from: Chicago, Illinois
- Trained by: Ohio Valley Wrestling; Fit Finlay
- Debut: 2004

Mary Louis Kanellis-Bennett (born February 25, 1982) is an American professional wrestler, manager, promoter, singer and model. She is best known for her tenures in WWE, TNA, All Elite Wrestling, and Ring of Honor.

Outside of wrestling, she is known for her 2008 Playboy magazine pictorial and 2010 appearances on the Celebrity Apprentice television series.

Kanellis' career began as a contestant on the reality show Outback Jack in 2004. In the same year, she placed fifth in the Diva Search, and was later hired by WWE as a backstage interviewer. Kanellis began competing in the ring as a professional wrestler in 2005 and received the Slammy Award for Diva of the Year in 2009. She released her debut album Sevin Sins in 2010 and departed WWE later that year. After departing WWE, she worked for Ring of Honor (ROH) and Impact Wrestling then Total Nonstop Action Wrestling (TNA) often appearing with her husband Mike Bennett. In TNA, she is a former TNA Knockouts Champion. Along with Bennett, she returned to WWE from 2017 to 2020 and held the WWE 24/7 Championship once.

== Early life ==
Kanellis was born in Ottawa, Illinois. She has Greek origins. She has two younger siblings; a brother and sister named Bill and Janny, respectively. Kanellis grew up with an interest in playing sports, particularly volleyball, basketball, and softball. She graduated from Ottawa Township High School in 2000, and then went on to study at Northern Illinois University. Before her career in wrestling began, Kanellis regularly competed in beauty pageants.

== Professional wrestling career ==
=== World Wrestling Entertainment (2004–2010) ===
==== Diva Search and beginnings (2004–2005) ====
Maria competed in the Diva Search in 2004, deciding to enter the contest after seeing an advertisement while watching Raw. Even though she only placed fifth in the contest, she was hired by the company. She stood out in the contest by giving fellow contestant Carmella DeCesare the finger after being eliminated from the contest. Maria began making appearances in Ohio Valley Wrestling (OVW), WWE's then-developmental territory. She contributed booking ideas, and her work at OVW earned her a spot on the Raw brand roster. Maria was brought on to Raw as a ditzy backstage interviewer and the host of WWE KissCam in November 2004. Her gimmick involved her asking wrong questions, irritating and amusing the roster.

In 2005, Maria began wrestling and was defeated in her first official match on the January 10, 2005, episode of Raw by Christy Hemme in a Lingerie Pillow Fight. On the March 14 episode of Raw, one of Maria's fillings legitimately fell out after she was slapped by Trish Stratus. She also competed in a Fulfill Your Fantasy Diva Battle Royal at Taboo Tuesday for the WWE Women's Championship, but was the first to be eliminated. On November 14, Maria competed in a non-title Diva Battle Royal at the Eddie Guerrero tribute Raw show, where she was one of the last three women left but was eliminated by Melina and Trish Stratus.

On the November 28 episode of Raw, Maria interviewed then-Raw General Manager Eric Bischoff, and asked him whether or not he thought he was going to be fired. He then booked her in a match with Kurt Angle out of spite, where Maria was laid out with the Angle Slam and nearly put in an Ankle Lock while unconscious before being saved by John Cena. As a result, one week later, Maria testified in the trial against Bischoff, who was being fired because of his controversial actions as general manager.

==== Various relationships (2006–2008) ====
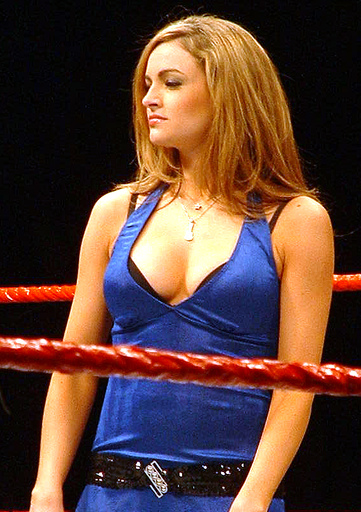
Maria in WWE in 2006

On the January 2, 2006, episode of Raw, Maria was attacked and stripped of her clothes by Vince's Devils (Victoria, Torrie Wilson, and Candice Michelle), but she was saved by Ashley Massaro. During a commercial break that night, Vince McMahon announced a Gauntlet Bra & Panties Match for New Year's Revolution between all five girls. At the event, Maria was the first to enter the Gauntlet match and eliminated Michelle and Wilson before being eliminated by Victoria. The match was ultimately won by Massaro. On the February 6, episode of Raw, Jonathan Coachman announced that Edge and Lita would have fought the mixed team of John Cena and Maria in the main event, and before the match John Cena kissed Maria, who came into his locker room to express her nervousness for the competition (despite the kiss, no on-screen romance between the pair was born). Maria scored the victory after a spear meant for Cena hit Lita. The following month, Lita defeated Maria in a one-sided singles match.

On the April 10 episode of Raw, Maria received a title match for Mickie James' WWE Women's Championship, but lost. On October 16, Maria won a Fatal Four-Way Bra and Panties match against Victoria, Candice, and Wilson to advance to the semi-finals in a Women's Championship Tournament. Maria, however, lost in the semi-finals to Lita.

On the November 6 episode of Raw, Maria was forced to compete in a match against Umaga by Eric Bischoff or be fired. Maria was completely destroyed and rag-dolled by Umaga before the match could begin, suffering a Samoan drop and running hip attack before John Cena ran out to stop the assault.

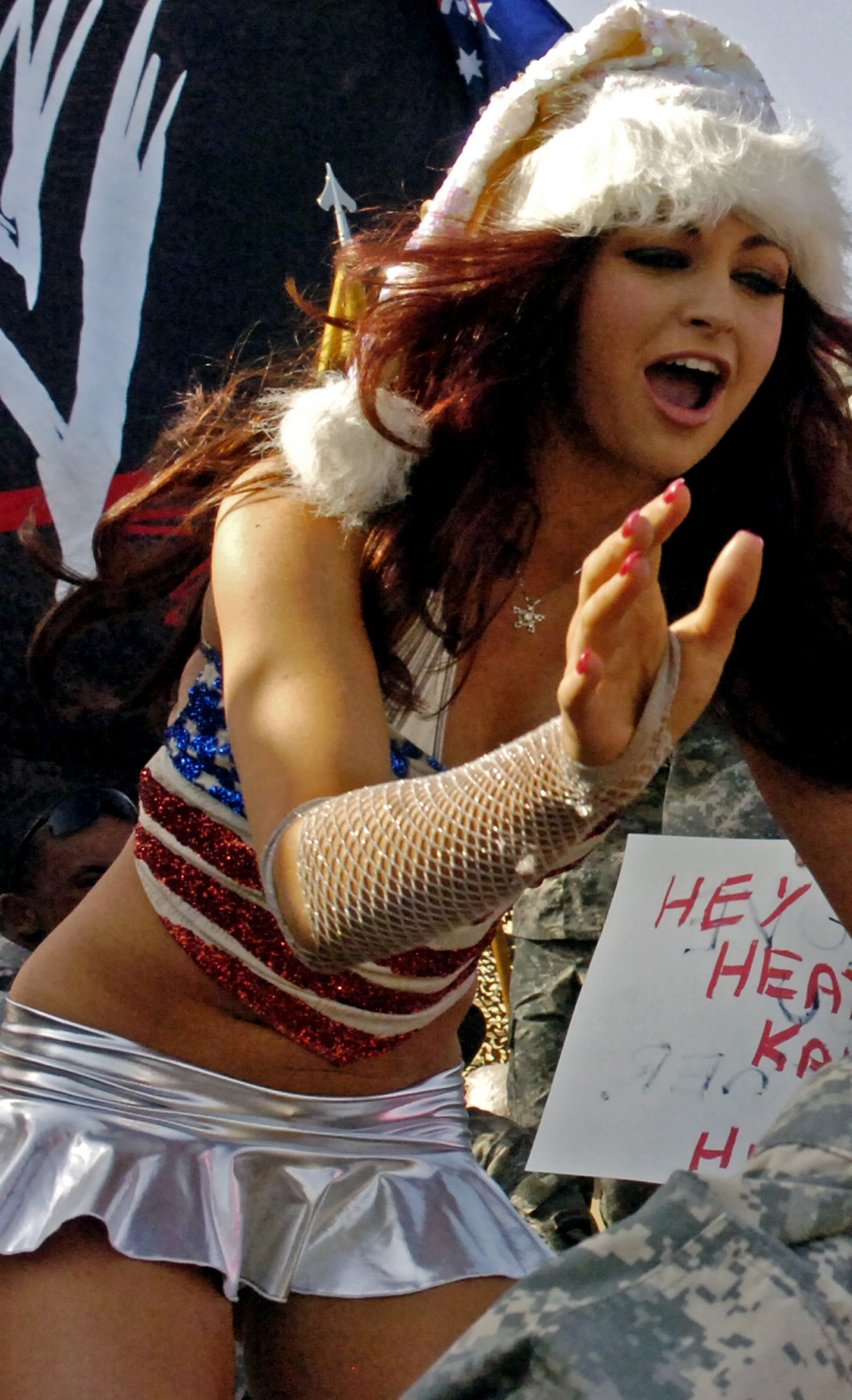
Maria at Tribute to the Troops event

On the January 1, 2007, episode of Raw, Maria attempted to interview Kevin Federline, but was instead slapped by Melina. This led to a match between the two later that night, which Melina won. At New Year's Revolution, Maria and Candice ran to the ring during the Women's Championship match between Victoria and Mickie James to stop Melina from interfering, helping James retain the title. In the following weeks she faced Melina in two tag team matches, where she won one. Maria began an on-screen romance with Santino Marella in June. On the November 5 episode of Raw, Marella was confronted by the returning Stone Cold Steve Austin for criticizing his movie, The Condemned. As a part of the storyline, the argument ended as Marella received a Stone Cold Stunner from Austin.

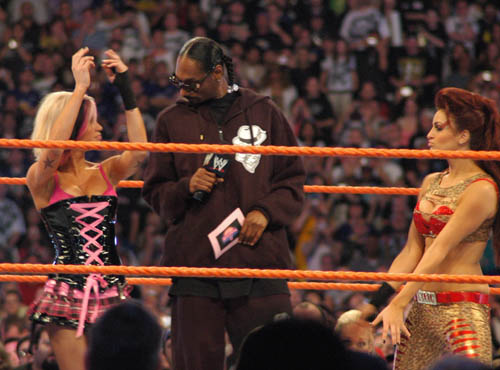
Maria (right) along with her tag team partner Ashley and Master of Ceremonies Snoop Dogg at WrestleMania XXIV in March 2008

After former Playboy cover-girl Ashley Massaro's return in early 2008, Kanellis engaged in backstage segments where Massaro suggested Maria should be on the cover of Playboy. As a part of the storyline, Maria defeated Beth Phoenix on February 18, to "earn the right" to be on the cover of the magazine. During her Playboy cover unveiling, Maria's cover was plastered over with images of Marella. After Marella offered an ultimatum of posing for the magazine or staying with him as a couple, she then broke up with him. Maria, along with Ashley were defeated by Phoenix and Melina at WrestleMania XXIV in a Playboy BunnyMania Lumberjill match. After the match, Maria passionately kissed the Master of Ceremonies, Snoop Dogg. The next night on Raw, Maria wrestled Marella, but the match ended with Maria as the winner. This ended their feud.

==== Championship pursuits and various alliances (2008–2009) ====
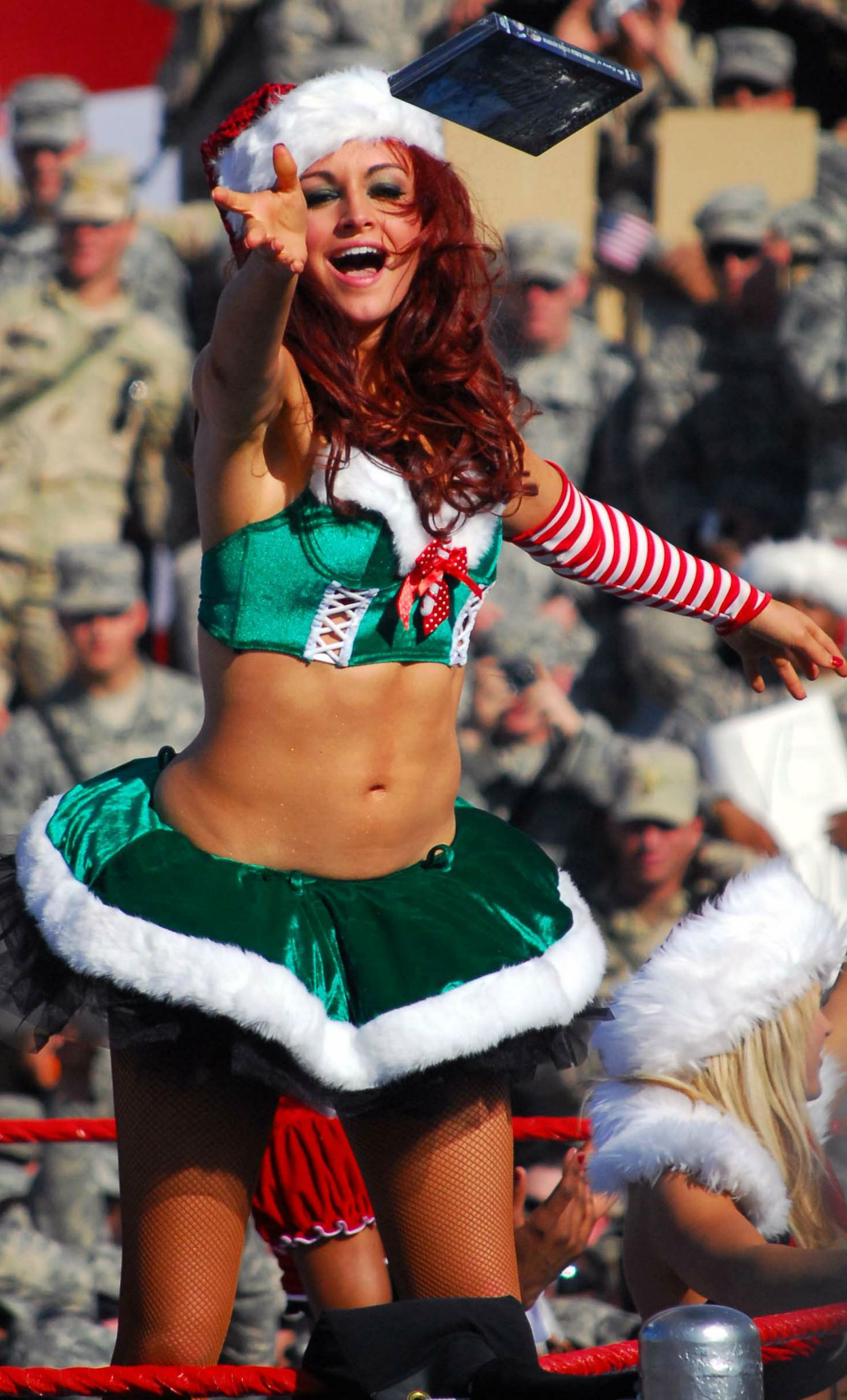
Maria at Tribute to the Troops event

As part of the 2008 WWE supplemental draft, Maria was drafted to the SmackDown brand. She made her debut on the August 1 episode of SmackDown by defeating Victoria. On the October 17 episode of SmackDown!, Maria won a "Las Vegas Dice on a Pole" match to become the number one contender for the WWE Divas Championship, but lost for the title against then-champion Michelle McCool. Maria participated in the Raw vs. Smackdown Divas match at Survivor Series, where she eliminated Jillian Hall before her team lost the match. On the December 5 episode of SmackDown!, Maria pinned Divas Champion Michelle McCool, but she was defeated by Maryse in a number one contender's match for the title two weeks later. At the Armageddon on December 14, Maria was part of the winning team of a Santa's Little Helper tag team match. On the December 26 episode of SmackDown!, she served as a special guest referee in the Divas Championship match between Maryse and McCool, where Maryse became the new champion. After the match, McCool turned heel and attacked Maria.

On the January 23, 2009, episode of SmackDown, Maria returned and attacked McCool during a match. On the February 13 episode of SmackDown, she defeated McCool following interference from Eve Torres. Over the next several weeks, Maria competed in various tag-team matches against McCool, with Maria winning three out of four matches. She also competed at WrestleMania XXV for the "Miss WrestleMania" crown, but was eliminated by Victoria. Throughout June, Maria served as the special guest referee in Diva matches. Maria made her in-ring return on the July 3 episode of SmackDown, teaming with Melina to defeat LayCool (Michelle McCool and Layla). Soon after, she entered into an on-screen relationship with Dolph Ziggler, despite her being a fan favorite and him being a villainous character. At Night of Champions, Maria accompanied Ziggler to his match with Rey Mysterio for Intercontinental Championship. In the following weeks, Melina implied that Ziggler was cheating on Maria, which Maria did not believe. Maria and Ziggler later broke up on the October 6 episode of SmackDown in a backstage segment, after she cost him his match with John Morrison. Maria then took a brief hiatus from the ring to film the Celebrity Apprentice, but returned on the December 4 episode of SmackDown by helping Mickie James fend off an attack by LayCool. She made her in-ring return the following week, teaming up with James to defeat LayCool. On December 14, Maria won the Slammy Award for Diva of the Year, which was voted for by WWE fans.

Final appearance and departure (2010)

After Mickie James defeated Michelle McCool to become WWE Women's Champion, Maria appeared post-match at the Royal Rumble with other Divas, to cake LayCool for revenge. Her last appearance would be in a six-person mixed tag team match on Superstars, in which she, Matt Hardy and The Great Khali were defeated by The Hart Dynasty. Then, Maria was released from her WWE contract on February 26.

=== Ring of Honor (2011–2015) ===
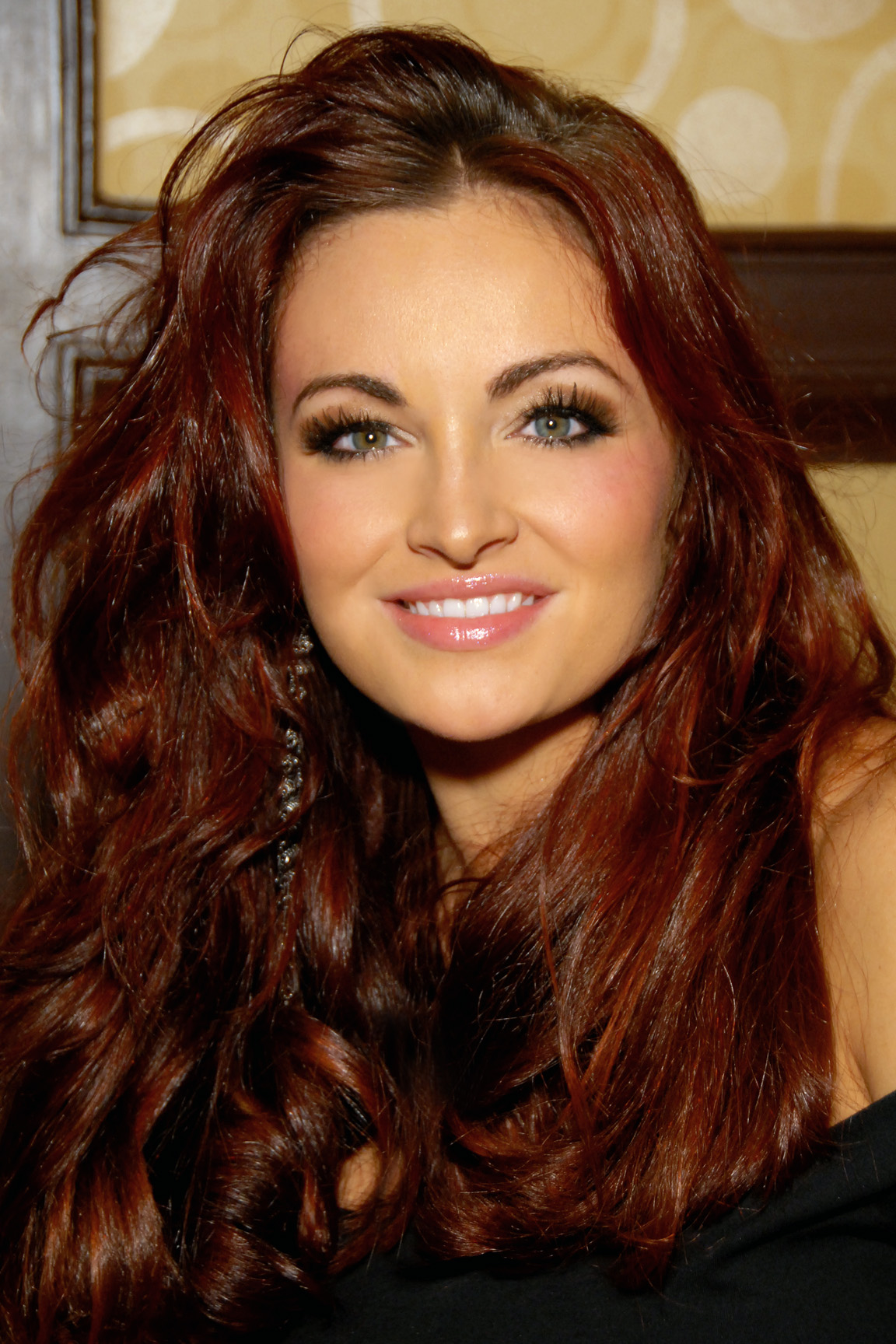
Kanellis in 2011

Maria confirmed on her Twitter account that she would be appearing at Ring of Honor (ROH)'s Final Battle pay-per-view on December 23, 2011. She accompanied her real-life boyfriend, Mike Bennett, as a villainess, in a three-way elimination match for the ROH World Television Championship, where he won.

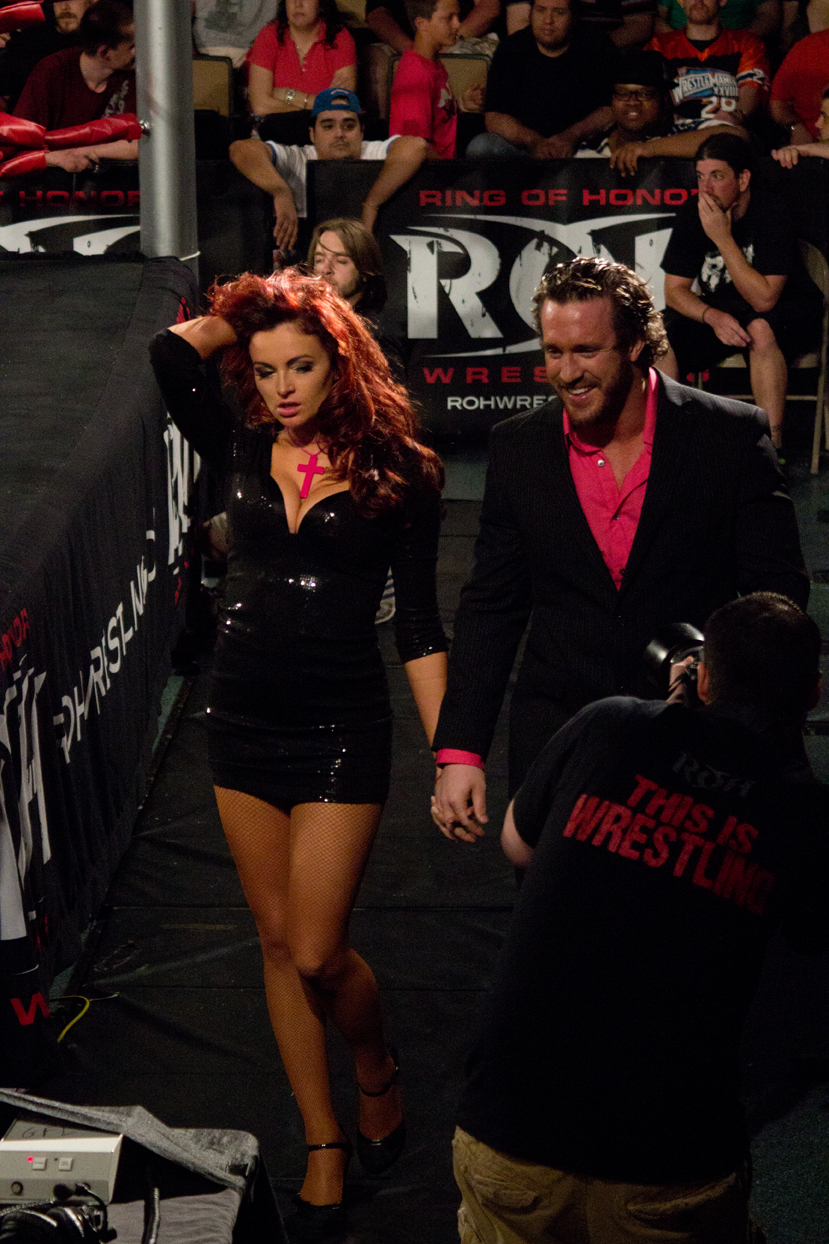
Maria and Mike Bennet in ROH

On January 7, 2012, tapings of Ring of Honor Wrestling, she was dubbed the "First Lady of ROH". At the June 21 tapings of Ring of Honor Wrestling, Kanellis accompanied Bennett and Brutal Bob Evans to the ring, where they lost to Eddie Edwards and Adam Cole. After the match, Kanellis, Bennett and Bob attacked Cole and Edwards, but were stopped by Sara Del Rey, who Edwards had brought in to neutralize Kanellis. At the Boiling Point on August 11, Maria and Bennett lost to Del Rey and Edwards in a mixed tag team match. In September 2012, Kanellis and Bennett became involved in a storyline with Mike Mondo after he kissed Kanellis during one of Bennett's matches. On Glory by Honor in October, Bennett defeated Mondo to end the feud. On December 16 at Final Battle 2012: Doomsday, Kanellis along with Bob accompanied Bennett to the ring where he defeated Jerry Lynn in his final ROH match before retirement.

On September 19, 2013, Maria and Bennett defeated The Brutal Burgers (Brutal Bob Evans and Cheeseburger) in an Intergender tag team match. On October 26, during Bennett's match with Kevin Steen at the Glory by Honor XII, Kanellis tried to interfere but was attacked by Lisa Marie Varon.

Kanellis and Bennett returned to ROH at the January 4, 2014, tapings of Ring of Honor Wrestling which aired on February 1, with Kanellis helping Bennett defeat Cedric Alexander. Throughout the summer, Maria and Bennett would get involved in Matt Hardy's feud with The Briscoes. During the feud, The Kingdom stole Jay Briscoe's title; Matt Hardy customized it as the Iconic Championship. At All Stars Extravaganza 6, Bennett and Maria customized the title as the Championship of Love. They were interrupted by Jay Briscoe's brother, Mark. Bennett and Kanellis left ROH after the December 19, 2015, Ring of Honor Wrestling taping, after failing to come to terms on a new contract with the promotion.

=== Other promotions (2012–2015) ===
On February 25, 2012, Maria won a tournament to determine the inaugural Family Wrestling Entertainment (FWE) Women's Champion. The victory also marked Kanellis' first championship in professional wrestling. She held the championship until March 24, when she lost it to Winter in a three-way match also involving Rosita. In July, Kanellis regained the championship from Winter. Kanellis successfully defended her title against Angelina Love at FWE: No Limits.

In September 2012, Kanellis made her debut for Chikara, managing Mike Bennett and The Young Bucks to the finals of the 2012 King of Trios tournament. Alongside Gavin Loudspeaker, Kanellis hosted the 2014 National Pro Wrestling Day. On October 4, 2014, Maria lost the FWE Women's Championship against Ivelisse Vélez

=== New Japan Pro-Wrestling (2015) ===
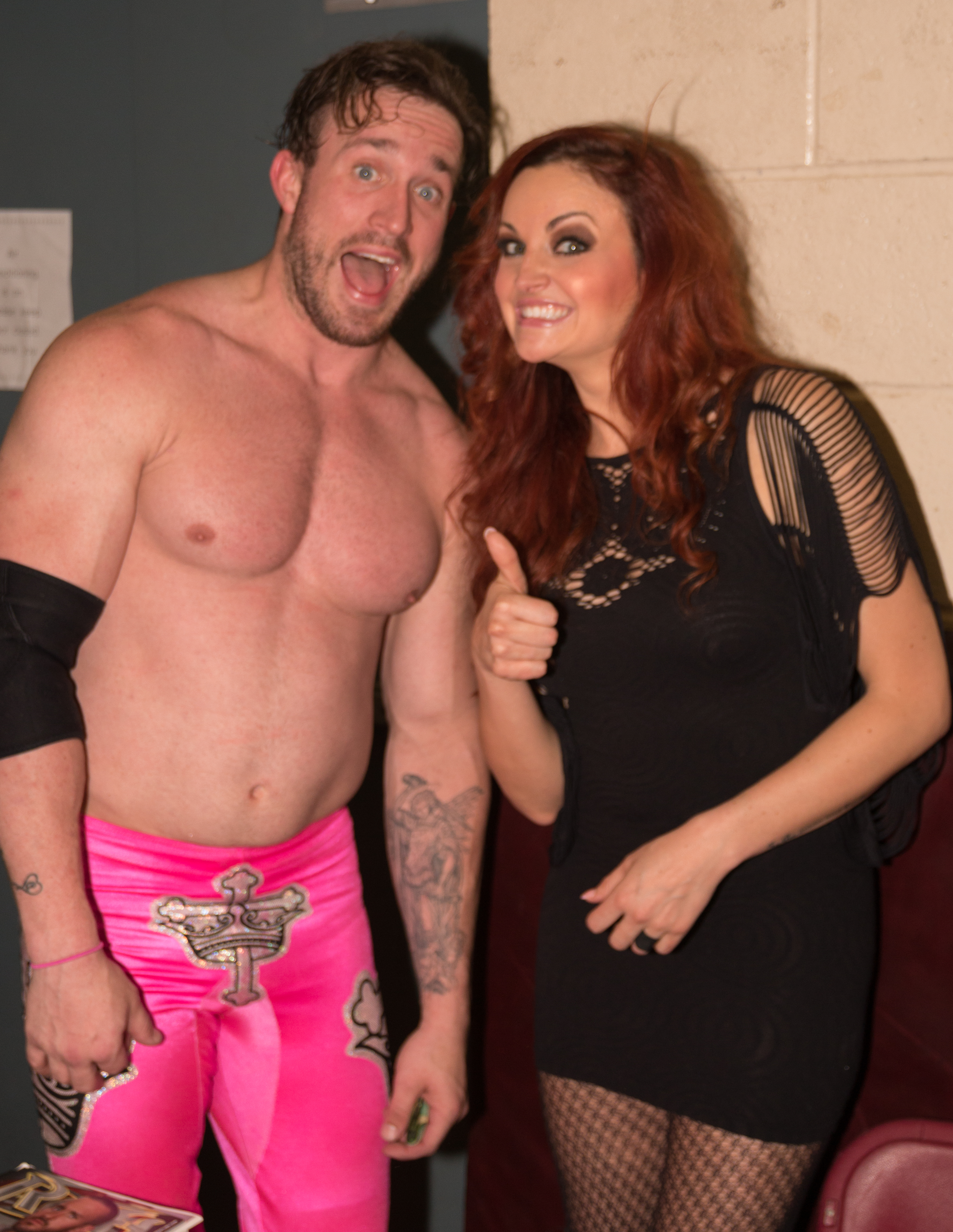
Kanellis and her husband Mike Bennett in 2015

On April 6, 2015, Kanellis managed Bennett and Matt Taven to capture New Japan Pro-Wrestling (NJPW)'s IWGP Tag Team Championship at Invasion Attack 2015. The following day, NJPW announced that, due to Mike Bennet's politics backstage, the promotion had booked its first match involving female wrestlers since October 2002, which would see Kanellis team up with Bennett and Taven to take on Amber Gallows, Doc Gallows and Karl Anderson at Wrestling Dontaku 2015 on May 3. Kanellis pinned Amber to win the match. On July 5 at Dominion 7.5 in Osaka-jo Hall, Kanellis accompanied Bennett and Taven to their first IWGP Tag Team Championship defense against Doc Gallows and Karl Anderson. The Kingdom lost the match and the championship, after Doc Gallows superkicked Kanellis, which distracted Bennett, leaving Taven alone to lose the match.

=== Total Nonstop Action Wrestling (2016–2017) ===
On January 5, 2016, during Impact Wrestling's premiere on Pop TV, Maria made her debut as a heel introducing her husband as "The Miracle" Mike Bennett. In February, Maria began a feud with Gail Kim after Kim refused Maria's help to make her go "mainstream". On the April 19 episode of Impact Wrestling, Maria won a ladder match to become the new Impact Knockouts Division Commissioner. During the feud between Maria and Gail Kim, where a singles match was set up for Slammiversary. On June 10, Maria then revealed on her Instagram account that she suffered a broken hand, and therefore she was not medically cleared to compete at Slammiversary and her match with Kim was called off. Kim was therefore added to the Knockouts Championship match, making it a triple threat match.

On the September 1, episode of Impact Wrestling, Maria berated and forcibly pinned her apprentice Allie to win the TNA Women's Knockout Championship for the first time in her career. On October 2 at the Bound for Glory pay-per-view, Kim defeated Maria for the title, ending her reign at 50 days and Gail Kim also defeated Maria to step down as the new TNA Knockouts Commissioner. After being convinced by Kevin Owens, the couple didn't re-sign with TNA and, on March 1, they left the promotion.

=== Return to WWE (2017–2020) ===
Return and managing Mike Kanellis (2017–2019)

On June 18, 2017, Kanellis returned to WWE alongside her husband Mike Kanellis in his WWE debut at Money in the Bank, establishing the Kanellis couple as heels for the first time in Maria's WWE career. On the July 18 episode of SmackDown, Maria helped Mike defeat Sami Zayn in his WWE debut match. In September, Kanellis went on a leave of absence from WWE, following her pregnancy announcement. On January 22, 2018, at the 25th Anniversary of Raw, a visibly pregnant Maria was honored as part of a segment involving women considered legends that contributed to the company's success, including The Bella Twins (Brie and Nikki), Maryse, Kelly Kelly, Lilian Garcia, Torrie Wilson, Michelle McCool, Terri Runnels, and WWE Hall of Famers Jacqueline and Trish Stratus.

Nine months later, on the October 10 episode of 205 Live, Maria officially made her television return as she interrupted a match between Lince Dorado and Lio Rush, allowing her husband, who attack Dorado. Three weeks later, on October 28, in her first match back in WWE since December 2009, Kanellis took part of the first ever all women's pay–per–view, Evolution, where she competed in a battle royal for a future women's championship match but she was eliminated by the eventual winner Nia Jax. Throughout the rest of the year, Kanellis would continue her managerial role as she would accompany her husband Mike to his matches on 205 Live where both would appear regularly. On January 16, Pro Wrestling Sheet's Ryan Satin reported that Maria and Mike recently asked WWE to release them from their contracts. Maria would go on to deny that she asked for her release. Mike Johnson of Pro Wrestling Illustrated reported that they were not backstage at the following episode of 205 Live. On January 27, 2019, at the Royal Rumble, Kanellis returned for the first time since Evolution in the previous year and competed in her first women's Royal Rumble match, entering at number 15 and lasting 08:12 minutes before she was eliminated by Alicia Fox. She would not appear on television until the January 29, 2019 205 Live, where she accompanied Mike in a match against Kalisto, in which the latter won.

24/7 Champion and departure (2019–2020)

On the July 1, 2019, episode of Raw, Mike and Maria lost a mixed tag team match against Seth Rollins and Becky Lynch. During the match, Maria revealed she was pregnant with her and Bennett's second child. On the July 29 episode of Raw, after Mike had won the WWE 24/7 Championship from R-Truth, he hid from a crowd of male wrestlers in his and Maria's locker room where Maria instructed Mike to lay down so she could pin him and win the title to become the 24/7 Champion, her first title in WWE. The following week, she lost the title back to Mike when he hugged her on the examination table during Maria's OB-GYN appointment. She then became the focal point of a story on TV, where she would say that Mike was not the father of her child, resulting in her husband losing matches in a humiliating manner. However, the storyline was dropped. According to her, the storyline would end with Mike being the father.

Kanellis hasn't appeared in WWE since 2019 and on April 15, 2020, Kanellis, her husband and many other employees were released from their WWE contracts due to budget cuts amidst the COVID-19 pandemic.

=== Return to ROH (2020–2021) ===
On December 20, 2020, ROH announced the return of Maria through their social media platforms, as Maria introduced "The Experience", where fans can discuss and influence about ROH online. On October 27, 2021, she was released by ROH among other wrestlers due to the company closing down.

=== Return to Impact Wrestling (2022) ===
At Hard To Kill, on January 8, 2022, Maria made her return to TNA, now known as Impact Wrestling, along with Mike Bennett, Matt Taven, PCO, and Vincent, where they attacked Eddie Edwards, Rich Swann, Willie Mack, Heath and Rhino.

On October 8, 2022, it was announced that Bennett, Kanellis, Taven and Vincent had left Impact Wrestling.

=== Women's Wrestling Army (2022–2023) ===
On April 14, 2022, Maria founded Women's Wrestling Army (WWA) in Chicago. Kanellis is the owner of the company alongside Bobby Cruise, a Ring of Honor (ROH) ring announcer. As of 2023, WWA has been inactive though no official statement of the company folding has been announced.

=== All Elite Wrestling / Ring of Honor (2022–2025) ===
Maria made her All Elite Wrestling (AEW) debut on the October 14, 2022, episode of Rampage, alongside Mike Bennett and Matt Taven, interrupting FTR and Shawn Spears' victory celebration. In 2023, Maria quietly left The Kingdom and began managing the team of Cole Karter and Griff Garrison in ROH, now the sister promotion of AEW. On January 31, 2025, Maria announced her departure from AEW.

== Other media ==
In 2004, she was a contestant on the reality show, Outback Jack. She made it to the final three before being eliminated.

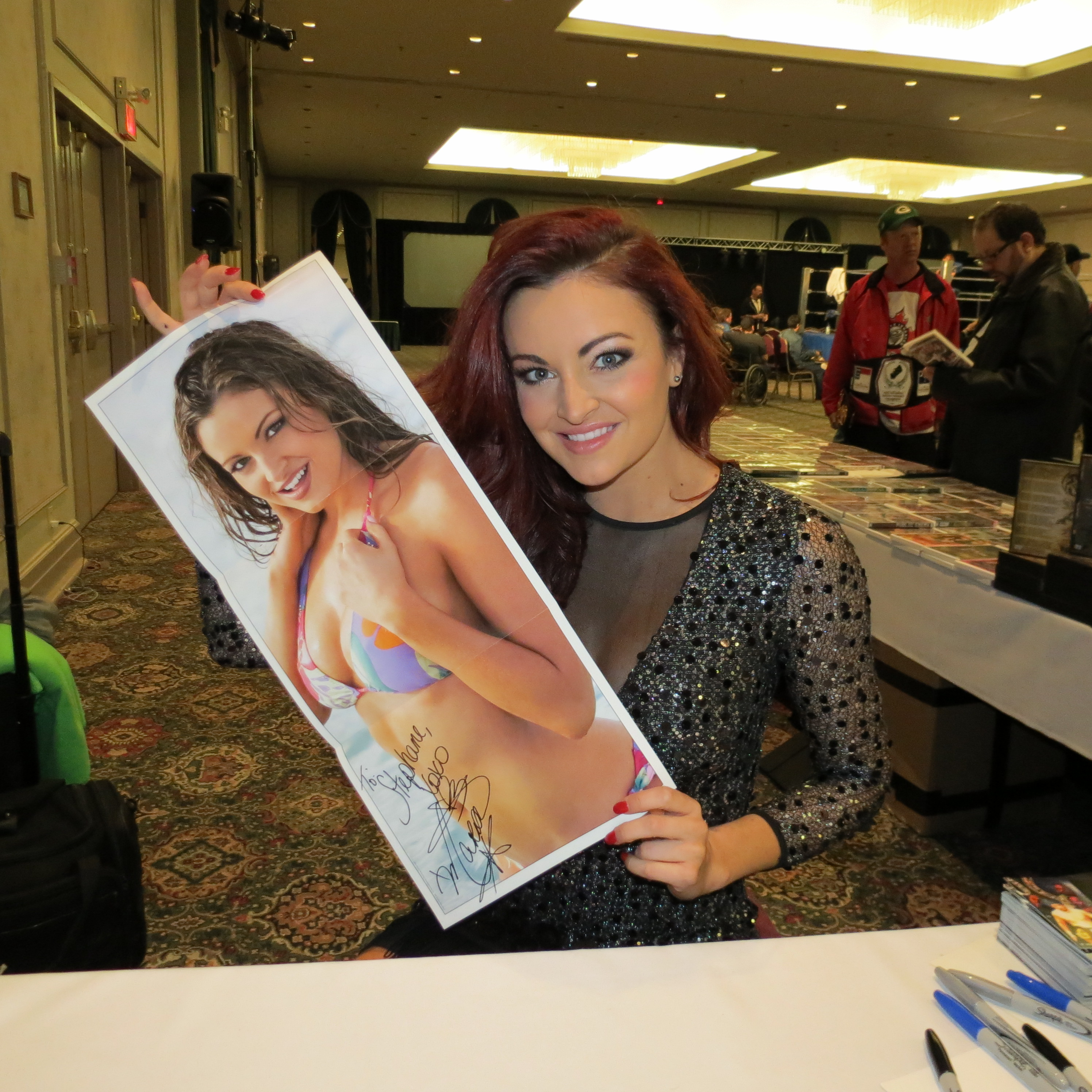
Maria during an autograph signing

During the week of November 5, 2007, she appeared on five episodes of Family Feud with several other WWE superstars. She also appeared on the February 6, 2008, episode of Project Runway with some of the other WWE Divas. On August 17, 2008, Maria, Candice Michelle, and Eve Torres were on an episode of Sunset Tan. Kanellis later appeared on VH1's Top 20 Video Countdown, along with John Cena. On December 17, 2009, she was a guest host on G4's Attack of the Show. Kanellis began a new career as a mixed martial arts announcer for HDNet on March 26, 2010, at the King of the Cage event in Reno, Nevada. Kanellis was also a contestant on The Celebrity Apprentice, which premiered in March 2010. She was eliminated on the May 16 episode. She placed fifth out of fourteen contestants.

Kanellis was first asked to pose for Playboy when she was nineteen years old, but she turned down the offer in fear of embarrassing her sister. She eventually posed for the cover of the April 2008 issue, with an accompanying nude pictorial. For the pictorial, she chose her own wardrobe and made the black hooded jacket she wore in one of the photos. That same year, FHM named her 53rd of 100 on their "The Sexiest Women 2008" list. With WWE transitioning to PG content a few months after Kanellis's pictorial and WWE dropping its use of the term WWE Diva in 2016 in favor of referring to the female talent as WWE Superstars along with the men, Kanellis was ultimately the last active WWE Diva to pose nude for the magazine.

Kanellis is also a singer and released her debut album Sevin Sins on April 13, 2010, with "Fantasy" as the first single.

In early 2011, Kanellis appeared in the Funny or Die web series, Swallow and in March 2011 she launched her own perfume line called Signature. In September 2011, Kanellis launched her DVD line in conjunction with Code Red DVD called Maria's B Movie Mayhem.

In January 2014, Kanellis and Bennett launched a weekly podcast called Mike & Maria in Wonderland.

Kanellis also owns and operates an event design company called Wonderland Event Productions.

Kanellis has appeared in four WWE video games. She made her in-game debut in SmackDown vs. Raw 2009. Maria also appears in SmackDown vs. Raw 2010, WWE 2K19 as DLC and WWE 2K20.

== Music career ==
In 2010 she released her debut single and music video fantasy. Following the release of the single she released EP Sevin Sins.

=== Discography ===
Singles & EPs

- 2010: Fantasy - Single
- 2010: Sevin Sins - EP

== Personal life ==
In a December 2011 interview, Kanellis confirmed she was dating Mike Bennett, and the couple were engaged in November 2012. On October 10, 2014, Kanellis and Bennett married. On September 25, 2017, Kanellis announced she and Bennett were expecting their first child. On April 3, 2018, the couple welcomed their daughter, Fredrica "Freddie" Moon Bennett. On the July 1, 2019, episode of Raw, during a mixed tag team match with Kanellis and Bennett against Seth Rollins and Becky Lynch, Kanellis announced that she and Bennett are expecting their second child. Maria and Mike welcomed their son Carver Mars Bennett on February 3, 2020. On June 30, 2025, Kanellis announced on her instagram that she and Bennett are expecting their third child. On January 20, 2026, the couple announced they welcomed another son, William Mercury Bennett, born on January 19.

In 2013, Kanellis was announced as one of the recipients of WWE's Talent Scholarship, which she utilized to obtain a degree in Sports, Entertainment, and Event Management from Johnson & Wales University, graduating in May 2017.

== Filmography ==
=== Film ===
Year	Title	Role	Notes
2012	Mother Hen	Kelly	
2013	Army of the Damned	Terry	
2014	Penance	Girl	Short film
2014	Tom & Gerry	Annabella	Short film
2014	The Opposite Sex	Hot Mess	
2017	Saving Christmas	Herself	

=== Television ===
Year	Title	Role	Notes
2004	Outback Jack	Herself	
2007	Family Feud	Herself	
2008	Magic's Biggest Secrets Finally Revealed	Herself	
2008	Project Runway	Herself	
2008	Sunset Tan	Herself	
2009	Attack of the Show	Herself	
2010	Celebrity Apprentice	Herself	
2010	Cubed	Herself	
2011	Swallow: The Series	Vicki	
2014	Fantasy Women Battles	Proserpine The Demon	
2023	Hey! (EW)	Herself	

=== Web series ===
Year	Title	Role	Notes
2017-2019	UpUpDownDown	Herself	4 episodes

=== Podcasts ===
Year	Title	Role	Notes
2020	Alicia Atout	Herself	1 episode
2021	Ring The Belle	Herself	1 episode
2021	The Milo Beasley Show	Herself	1 episode
2021	Love Wrestling	Herself	2 episodes
2021	SHAK Wrestling	Herself	1 episode
2022	Bell To Belles	Herself	1 episode
2022	SEScoops	Herself	1 episode
2022	Bleav in Pro Wrestling	Herself	1 episode
2022	The Wives of Wrestling Podcast	Herself	1 episode
2022	Cafe de Rene with Rene Dupree	Herself	1 episode
2022	Women In Wrestling	Herself	1 episode
2022	Just Alyx	Herself	1 episode
2021-2022	Fightful Wrestling With Sean Ross Sapp	Herself	3 episodes
2021-2022	Women’s Wrestling Talk	Herself	2 episodes
2022	The Wrestling History Channel	Herself	1 episode
2022-2023	WrestleZone	Herself	2 episodes
2023	AEW Unrestricted	Herself	1 episode
2024	Monopoly Events	Herself	1 episode
2024	Another Wrestling Podcast	Herself	1 episode
2024	GABBY AF	Herself	1 episode

== Championships and accomplishments ==
- Family Wrestling Entertainment
  - FWE Women's Championship (2 times, inaugural)
- Pro Wrestling Illustrated
  - Ranked No. 21 of the top 50 female wrestlers in the PWI Female 50 in 2008
- Total Nonstop Action Wrestling
  - TNA Knockouts Championship (1 time)
- World Wrestling Entertainment/WWE
  - WWE 24/7 Championship (1 time)
  - Slammy Award (1 time)
    - Diva of the Year (2009)
