= Women's Wrestling Army =

American independent professional wrestling promotion

- Founded: April 14, 2022; 3 years ago
- Style: Professional wrestling
- Headquarters: Chicago, Illinois, US
- Founder(s): Maria Kanellis-Bennett
- Owner(s): Bobby Cruise; Maria Kanellis-Bennett

Women's Wrestling Army (WWA) is an American independent women's professional wrestling promotion, founded on April 14, 2022, by Maria Kanellis-Bennett. Kanellis is also the owner of the company alongside Bobby Cruise, a Ring of Honor (ROH) ring announcer.

== History ==
On April 14, 2022, Maria Kanellis-Bennett teased on her social media a new project named Women's Wrestling Army (WWA), an all-woman wrestling promotion. On April 22, Bobby Cruise, mostly known as Ring of Honor (ROH) ring announcer, announced to join Kanellis' new promotion as a co-owner. WWA held it first event in Providence, Rhode Island, where during the main event, the NWA World Women's Tag Team Champions The Hex (Allysin Kay and Marti Belle) successfully defended their title against the team of Holidead and Willow Nightingale.

On June 15, Kanellis confirmed that WWA would start airing episodes on the streaming platform Pro Wrestling TV (PWTV). WWA also published monthly contact on the BrandArmy platform. On July 9, it was confirmed that Allison Danger would join WWA as a coach.
