= The Mortuary Assistant (film) =

- Theatrical release poster
- Directed by: Jeremiah Kipp
- Written by: Tracee Beebe; Brian Clarke
- Based on: The Mortuary Assistant by Brian Clarke
- Produced by: Patrick Ewald; Cole Payn
- Starring: Willa Holland; Paul Sparks
- Cinematography: Kevin Duggin
- Edited by: Don Money
- Music by: Jeffery Alan Jones
- Production companies: Epic Pictures Group; Creativity Capital
- Distributed by: Shudder
- Release date: February 13, 2026
- Running time: 91 minutes
- Country: United States
- Language: English
- Box office: $1,718,973

The Mortuary Assistant is a 2026 American supernatural horror film directed by Jeremiah Kipp from a screenplay by Tracee Beebe and Brian Clarke. Based on the 2022 video game by Brian Clarke, it stars Willa Holland and Paul Sparks.

The film was released on February 13, 2026, in limited theater release. It was released on Shudder on March 26, 2026.

== Plot ==
Rebecca, a woman with a troubled past, has taken a job at a mortuary. After obtaining her one-year medallion from Narcotics Anonymous, her boss, Raymond, calls her in to work the night shift. Per instructions, Rebecca embalms then burns a body, questioning the need for both procedures. Strange things begin to happen. She sees a shadowy figure and various hallucinations. She wakes up at home to her sponsor, Kelly, banging on the door. Kelly states Rebecca called and asked her to come over but Rebecca has no recollection of doing this. Rebecca then loses control. Her eyes go yellow and she violently attacks and kills Kelly with a corkscrew through the temple. Raymond calls Rebecca and says he knows what she is seeing is frightening. He tells her to go back to the mortuary because it's safer there, saying he will explain later.

While Rebecca is on the phone, Kelly stands up and moves towards her before collapsing when Rebecca turns to look at her. Rebecca runs to the door to leave. When she opens it, Kelly is standing there having only just arrived. Rebecca runs past Kelly and returns to the mortuary where Raymond is waiting. Raymond begins explaining what is happening and exactly what she needs to do before Rebecca's eyes close. Raymond calls Rebecca's name and her eyes open and are yellow. She begins berating and attacking Raymond, who runs out of the mortuary, sealing Rebecca inside. Rebecca wanders the mortuary, no longer possessed, sees her deceased father. Raymond calls her and tells her to cut the wrist of a body and burn it, which she does.

Rebecca continues to hallucinate. Raymond calls again and Rebecca says that burning the body did not work. Raymond says he hasn't spoken to her since he left and tells her to find the tapes in the basement. Raymond's voice changes and he shifts from being helpful to telling her to inject herself with embalming fluid and burn herself. Rebecca goes to the basement and finds tapes in which Raymond explains that to stop demons they need to be embalmed with reagent and burned. Reagent is shown to be blood from a woman Raymond has locked in a box. Rebecca follows Raymond's instructions and finds symbols written on the wall. She hallucinates again and finds the woman in the box in the storage room. She places a tablet with the name of the demon which she has found around the mortuary on a cadaver while it begins to question her. She then burns it.

Rebecca awakens in the morning in the mortuary and goes back to the storage room and releases the woman in the box with bolt cutters. The woman berates Rebecca as Raymond comes into the room showing a tattoo on his chest which makes the woman back up into the box. Raymond tells Rebecca he will explain upstairs. Raymond explains that the woman isn't alive and died long ago. He needs the woman's blood to prevent others deaths. Rebecca will never be free of the demons, but Raymond says he can teach her to live above the fear. Rebecca leaves the mortuary and smiles as she sees ordinary people living their lives in a park nearby. She looks across into some brush and sees a demonic figure staring back at her with a grin. She looks back at it briefly before returning to the mortuary.

== Cast ==
- Willa Holland as Rebecca Owens
- Paul Sparks as Raymond Delver

== Production ==
On September 22, 2022, DreadXP and its parent company Epic Pictures Group announced the development of a movie adaptation of The Mortuary Assistant with Jeremiah Kipp writing and directing, and Willa Holland starring as Rebecca Owens and Paul Sparks as Raymond Delver.

== Release ==
The Mortuary Assistant was released in limited theaters on February 13, 2026, and was available to stream on Shudder beginning March 27, 2026.

== Reception ==
=== Box Office ===
The film released on February 13, 2026 in 208 theaters and earned $259,338 on its opening, grossing $1.5 million on its whole run.

=== Critical response ===
On the review aggregator website Rotten Tomatoes, 37% of 35 critics' reviews are positive, with an average rating of 4.9/10. The website's consensus reads: "The Mortuary Assistant squanders its chilling premise in a scare-starved story that buries the game's atmosphere beneath bloated lore and a muddled narrative."

The Guardian's Catherine Bray gave it 2/5 stars, writing, "The Mortuary Assistant lacks the light to contrast with the shadows: Rebecca and Raymond are both dark, tormented, oblique characters, occupying dark, tormented, stylised worlds, and there's very little light to balance it out. After a while, you adjust: what should be scary stops being scary; it's just the norm for these guys." Meagan Navarro of Bloody Disgusting also gave it a score of 2/5, writing, "All might be forgiven if The Mortuary Assistant delivered on what made the game such a success: scaring you silly. The imagery is there, but woefully misutilized. Kipp never lingers long enough on any of it to register; scare tactics get repetitive, and atmosphere is nonexistent. This nightshift nightmare is far more likely to put you to sleep."

Lucy Buglass of TechRadar gave the film a score of 4/5 stars. She wrote, "Willa Holland is brilliant as protagonist Rebecca Owens", and "All in all, this is a strong adaptation, and there's lots for fans of the game to enjoy, especially if you're keen to expand on the lore and backstory. Don't go into this expecting a shot-for-shot remake of the game, and instead, it should be treated as a very worthy expansion."
