= A Knight's War =

2025 independent Canadian film

- Promotional release poster
- Directed by: Matthew Ninaber
- Written by: Matthew Ninaber
- Produced by: Matthew Ninaber
- Starring: Jeremy Ninaber; Kristen Kaster; Matthew Ninaber; Kristen MacCulloch
- Cinematography: Brent Tremain
- Production companies: Epic Pictures Group; High Rise Studio
- Distributed by: DREAD
- Release date: February 7, 2025
- Running time: 103 minutes
- Country: Canada
- Language: English

A Knight's War is a 2025 independent Canadian dark fantasy film produced, directed, and written by Matthew Ninaber. The film stars Jeremy Ninaber, the brother of Matthew Ninaber, as Bhodie, a knight who is tasked with rescuing a young red-haired girl who is believed to be the Chosen One who will fulfill a prophecy.

== Plot ==
Two knights, Bhodie and William, are searching for Avalon, a red-haired girl who has been prophesied to be their kingdom's savior. When they find her, cultists banish her to an hellish alternate realm filled with demons and monsters. William sends Bhodie into the alternate realm to rescue her, where Bhodie make a pact with a Gatekeeper who grants him a talisman that allows him to relive the day again if he dies. Together, Bhodie and Avalon battle against witches, demons, and the three lords of the realm to open the gate home.

== Cast ==
- Jeremy Ninaber as Bhodie
- Kristen Kaster as Avalon
- Matthew Ninaber as William
- Kristen MacCulloch as Malenor

== Production ==
Writer, director, and producer Matthew Ninaber said that he first came up with the idea for the movie while he was in high school, and that it was inspired by films such as Conan the Barbarian, Willow, and First Knight. He also said that he was inspired by The Elder Scrolls video game series, as well as the Book of Enoch.

The film was financed by Epic Pictures and High Rise Studio, and was released under Epic Pictures' DREAD label.

The film was primarily filmed in Kitchener, Ontario. The primary sets were constructed in director Matthew Ninaber's and star Jeremy Ninaber's backyards. Matthew Ninaber said that they worked on painting and extending the sets in between shooting. Mathew and Jeremy Ninaber's father, Ralph Ninaber, served as the film's production designer.

== Release ==
A Knight's War had a limited theatrical run in the United States starting on February 7 and released on video-on-demand on February 11. The film also had a limited theatrical run in Canada in March 2025. It released on Blu-ray on April 15, 2025.

== Reception ==
Phil Hoad of The Guardian rated the film 3 out of 5 stars. He praised the film's atmosphere and mood, but criticized its acting and plot. He also compared the film to the video game series Dark Souls.

== See also ==
- PG: Psycho Goreman
