= Katarina Waters =

German-born English professional wrestler

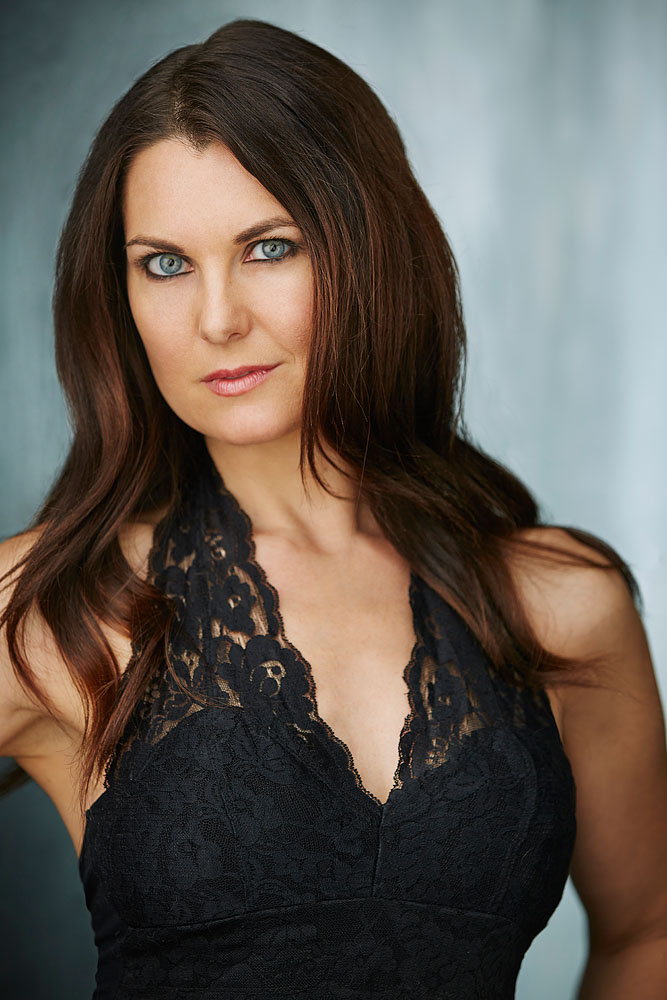
- Waters in 2016

Personal information
- Born: Katarina Leigh Waters; 10 November 1980 (age 45) Lüneburg, Lower Saxony, West Germany

Professional wrestling career
- Ring names: The Beautiful Nightmare; Katarina; Katarina Winter; Katie Lea; Katie Lea Burchill; Kat La Noir; Kat Waters; Nikita; The Temptress; Winter
- Billed height: 5 ft 8 in (1.73 m)
- Billed weight: 140 lb (64 kg)
- Billed from: Chelsea, England
- Trained by: Jon Ryan; Mark Sloan; Alex Shane
- Debut: 2000
- Retired: 2019

Katarina Leigh Waters (born 10 November 1980) is a German-born English American filmmaker, actress, and retired professional wrestler. She is best known for her time with Impact Wrestling under the ring names Katarina or Winter and for her time in WWE under the ring name Katie Lea Burchill. She spent many years on the independent circuit, particularly in the Frontier Wrestling Alliance, where she used the ring name Nikita.

After signing with WWE, she competed in their former developmental territory Ohio Valley Wrestling, where she became a two time Women's Champion, before being called up to the main roster. After being released from the WWE in April 2010, Waters joined TNA in August 2010, adopting the new ring name Winter. During her first year in the company, she won both of the promotion's women's championships, first teaming with Angelina Love to win the Knockouts Tag Team Championship in December 2010 and then winning the Knockouts Championship two times in June and August 2011.

== Professional wrestling career ==
=== Early career (2000–2002) ===
At a young age, Waters read an article about the main event of WrestleMania VI and believed the Ultimate Warrior's mysterious origins to be true. When she came to England at 18, she was under the impression that wrestling companies only existed in America until she saw a local show advertised in London. However, the show's style was catered more towards British wrestling than sports entertainment and Waters once again retired thoughts of becoming involved in wrestling until she saw Alex Shane and Dominator on The Jerry Springer Show with their more outrageous gimmicks and became interested again, seeking out National Wrestling Alliance (NWA) UK Hammerlock and being trained by Jon Ryan. Originally, Waters used the name Kat but after Stacy Carter began using this name in the World Wrestling Federation (WWF), she changed her name to Nikita after the television program La Femme Nikita. After being trained Waters made her debut in February 2000 on ITV Meridian's TransAtlantic Wrestling Challenge, a tournament between British and American wrestlers of the NWA where she won the Women's Championship.

=== Frontier Wrestling Alliance (2002–2006) ===
==== Feud with The Family (2002–2003) ====
After starting her wrestling career, Waters sought the Frontier Wrestling Alliance (FWA) and began training with Alex Shane, who inspired her on The Jerry Springer Show. With Shane she began hosting a talk radio programme on Talksport which helped FWA gain national notoriety among the wrestling community. Because of her association with the show she was placed on the card for their February 2002 event, Revival, where she lost to Lexie Fyfe. However, the match was badly reviewed backstage and Waters began training twice a week to improve herself. To keep exposure while improving her in-ring skills, she began to frequently tag team with fellow newcomer Hade Vansen in mixed tag team matches, including a match against British female veteran Sweet Saraya, until August when she impressed with a singles match against Paul Travell. This led to a feud where Travell dominated until the end of 2002 but in the first FWA event of 2003 Nikita picked up her first singles victory in the company over Travell and went on a singles winning streak for a month until she lost in her third bout against Andy Simmons.

While Nikita had become successful as a solo wrestler, however, her rivalry with Travell had escalated when he became part of The Family, a group of villainous wrestlers who became FWA Tag Team Champions. The feud escalated after Nikita and Shane failed to win the Tag Team Championship a number of times and led to one of Waters' most famous moments in wrestling when, at the Frontiers of Honour co-held with American promotion Ring of Honor (ROH) in May Alex Shane, Ulf Herman, and Nikita took on The Family (Travell, Brandon Thomas, and Scott Parker) in a hardcore six-man tag team match. Though The Family won, Nikita gained notoriety when she jumped from the top tier in the arena onto the ground, landing on The Family and their feud ended. Waters spoke about this moment in Alternative Wrestling Magazine saying "So the crowd saw what I was about to do and started reacting and cheering before I had even done any-thing, and just that moment standing up there in the light and hearing that was, well, let's just say I wanted to stay up there forever". It was later announced to be the tenth most memorable moment of the FWA's first decade in their YouTube Top 20 Countdown.

==== Sporadic appearances (2003–2006) ====
With her rivalry against The Family over, Nikita began a new storyline where an anonymous bounty had been put on her head. As she took on all comers trying to claim the bounty, Nikita went undefeated in the rest of 2003 and 2004. By June 2004 she had faced and defeated most of the company's major wrestlers which led to the return of the World Association of Wrestling's veteran Sweet Saraya who revealed the bounty had been placed on Nikita by the jealous ring announcer, Jane Childs. Saraya claimed the bounty with a non-sanctioned assault on Nikita, delivering a tombstone piledriver at the Carpe Diem event putting Nikita out of action for months and off the FWA roster for over a year. She returned in October 2005 in a losing effort against Simply Luscious. She was victorious on the next show in a six-man tag team match, with her and Luscious on opposing teams. Though Nikita would not wrestle after this point, she realigned herself with former tag team partner Hade Vansen and at New Frontiers 2006 helped him win the FWA British Heavyweight Championship in a five-way event featuring Joe Legend, Alex Shane, Jody Fleisch, and Jonny Storm. She remained at Vansen's side until June's FWA Vs All Star Wrestling event year when she announced her retirement from the company as she had been scouted for World Wrestling Entertainment (WWE) and sent to Ohio Valley Wrestling (OVW) for training.

=== International circuit (2005–2006) ===
In 2005, she flew to France to take part in the Fighting Spirit Federation's subordinate promotion Queens of Chaos. In an exhibition match she aligned herself with German wrestler Sick (Dejan Stegar) in a losing tag team effort to Kid Kash and Trinity. However, in the Queen of the Rumble match with the World Queen of Chaos Championship on the line she entered second and became the winner, besting competition from England, Ireland, America, and Japan. She defended the title all over France and in Switzerland until almost exactly a year later when, after defending the belt against Skye in a two out of three falls match, she announced she had exclusively signed with WWE and had to relinquish the title undefeated. During her time on the Continent she made a guest appearance in German Stampede Wrestling (GSW), losing to Wesna with Nora Greenwald as referee International Impact III. She returned to GSW for Night In Motion VII: A Few Good Men in July 2006 to take on the promotion's other premiere female wrestler and namesake, Blue Nikita. The Greek Nikita won the match and since then Waters has used the name Katie Lea instead.

Just before she lost her Nikita name to Blue Nikita, Waters took part in the video tapings for Shimmer Women Athletes in May 2006. Playing a fan favourite in Volume 5, she defeated Lacey but then for Volume 6 became a villain by using underhanded tactics and was pinned by Daizee Haze.

=== World Wrestling Entertainment (2006–2010) ===
==== Ohio Valley Wrestling (2006–2008) ====
After relocating to the United States, Waters began using the ring name Katie Lea, having lost a match to Greek wrestler and namesake Blue Nikita. She made her debut with a dark match victory over Melody on 23 August. A week later she teamed with ODB to make her television debut, losing to Beth Phoenix and Serena. At the time ODB, seeing herself as the best wrestler in OVW, created the OVW Women's Championship for herself and defended it in a battle royal, in which Lea unsuccessfully participated. On 13 September she had another chance in a four-way match but Serena won the belt, besting Lea, Phoenix, and ODB. Her next title opportunity, on 11 October, ended in disqualification when an angry Serena, who had lost the belt to Phoenix, interrupted her three-way match also including ODB. Lea consoled herself by winning a Halloween costume contest.

The day after Halloween saw the OVW Women's Championship contested in a gauntlet match, which Lea won by last pinning Serena, earning her first Women's Championship. She held the title for 212 days, giving her the longest single and combined reigns until Melody went over that mark in June 2009. Phoenix did not take her loss well as it was not in a straight singles match and tried to earn a rematch but lost to Lea in a mixed tag team match the following week, with El Aero Fuego and Charles Evans as their respective partners. Lea tried to defend her belt against Serena but the match ended in disqualification when a jealous Phoenix attacked Serena for having a chance before her and so on 22 November the three were put in a no-disqualification non-title match which Serena won. Having already defended her belt against Serena, though, Lea continued to defend against newcomers, such as ODB and Jennifer Fit. She also began to host an in-ring talk segment entitled "Kat's Kradle.

After this match, on 6 December, Phoenix made her way to the ring and announced herself as still being champion with her own belt. Troubleshooter, or authority figure, Danny Basham announced that as ODB had created the belt for herself neither belt was official but promised to settle the matter. At 13 December OVW television tapings he announced that the dispute would be settled in OVW's first ladies ladder match and the winner would be officially recognised as Women's Champion. In the last television episode of 2006, Lea climbed to the top of the ladder to retrieve both belts and become the undisputed OVW Women's Champion as the year closed. Their feud closed on the first episode of 2007 when Basham went to present the OVW Women's Championship, giving it official recognition in the company, only for Phoenix to snatch it from him. However, this proved to be a show of sportsmanship as Phoenix presented the belt to Lea herself in recognition of their competitive ladder match.

She then began a feud with Cherry Pie after two successful title defences against her resulted in an assault from Pie's stablemates The Untouchables (Deuce and Domino) until Jon Bolen and Ryan Reeves saved her. Days later at a non-televised event, Lea and Bolen defeated Cherry and Domino in a mixed tag match. However, the televised rematch was a three-on-two handicap with all three Untouchables defeating Lea and Bolen. At the end of January all the women in OVW competed in a two out of three tug of war which Lea was on the winning side. This led to the Miss OVW competition which saw the women compete in a variety of competitions and matches with ODB gaining the crown on 21 March. After this ODB picked up a non-title victory on 11 April and win by disqualification the following week and with a battle royal victory earned herself contention for the title. On 1 June, ODB brought Lea's reign as champion to an end in singles action at OVW Six Flags. After a series of mixed tag team contests between the two, ODB retained her title in a three-way match also featuring Victoria Crawford on 21 July. She pinned Phoenix in August for another shot at the belt but came up short at the end of the month.

Milena Roucka then won the belt from ODB in a six-way dark match, in which Lea participated. After defeating Roucka twice in non-title matches In late October, Roucka attacked Lea in a game of duck, duck, goose and subsequently defeated Lea in a Kiss My Foot match in December to retain the title. In 2008, Lea began receiving presents from a secret admirer including a telegram, flowers, and an outfit. By late February, Paul Burchill revealed himself to be her admirer and helped her win the Women's Championship for the second time. She lost the title a week later to Josie in a dark match because WWE had severed ties with OVW and called her up to their programming.

==== Debut and championship pursuits (2008–2009) ====
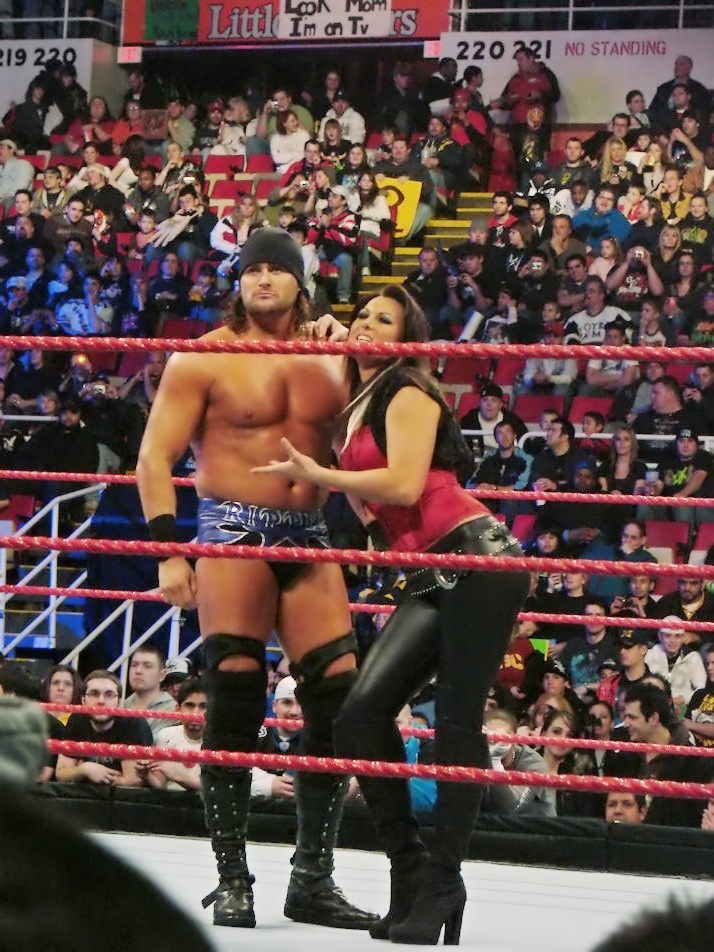
Lea along her on-screen brother Paul Burchill during a WWE Raw event in 2008

Waters made her television debut on 11 February's Raw (airing on tape delay from the previous week) as the on-screen sister of fellow FWA alumnus Paul Burchill, becoming Katie Lea Burchill. The two originally displayed early signs of a gimmick based around incest with Paul using the catchphrase "whatever Katie wants, Katie gets", but owing to the WWE changing its television rating to PG (Parental Guidance) later that year, the incest indications stopped. At WrestleMania XXIV, Lea was one of the lumberjills in the Playboy BunnyMania Match, in which Beth Phoenix and Melina defeated Maria and Ashley.

After appearing alongside Burchill on WWE Heat, Lea made her in-ring television debut on 28 April episode of Raw defeating Super Crazy in an intergender Handicap Match along with Burchill.

On 19 May, on Raw, she had a confrontation with the Women's Champion, Mickie James where she insinuated James had used her relationship with John Cena to sleep her way to success. Two weeks later, Lea teamed up with Beth Phoenix in a winning effort defeating James and Melina, in which she pinned James. On 16 June episode of Raw, Lea and Burchill defeated James and Mr. Kennedy in a mixed tag team match, where Lea pinned James a second time, thus earning a title shot At the Night of Champions pay-per-view, Lea challenged Mickie James for the WWE Women's Championship but was unsuccessful in capturing the title. On 14 July episode of Raw, Lea once again challenged James for the Women's Championship, but was unsuccessful. After she and her brother beat James and Kofi Kingston, she received another chance at James' title in August but failed to win.

She closed out the year by appearing tag team matches, regularly teaming with Jillian Hall. On the last Raw of the year, she made her final appearance in a battle royal to determine the next challenger for the Women's Championship, which was ultimately won by Melina.

==== Brand switches and departure (2009–2010) ====
Two days later, on 30 December, it was revealed that Lea and Burchill had been moved to the ECW brand, but failed to make an impression with Burchill losing to continue DJ Gabriel's winning streak. Going into 2009, Lea made a better impact in her ECW on Sci Fi debut with a win against Gabriel's partner Alicia Fox. However, the Burchills lost a tag team match against Gabriel and Fox the following week.

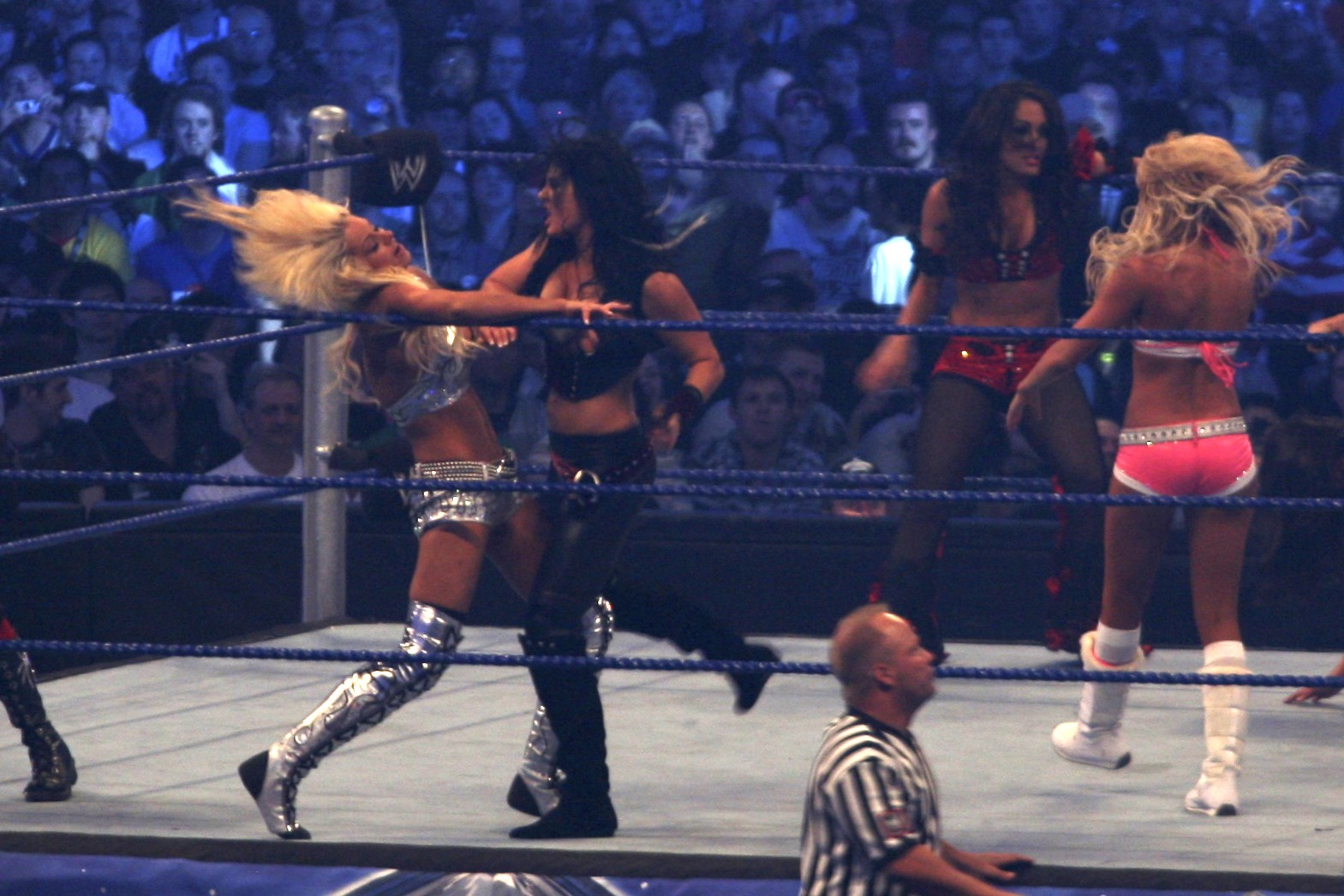
Waters (in black) wrestling Maryse at the WrestleMania XXV event in April 2009

On 5 April 2009, she competed in the 25-Diva Battle Royal at WrestleMania XXV, but the match was won by Santina Marella. Lea wrestled again in July 2009 against the newly drafted Bella Twins. First facing Nikki, Katie took the advantage but Nikki swapped places with her twin sister, fooling both Katie and the referee, causing Katie to lose. Two weeks later on WWE Superstars, the twins made the same switch in reverse order after the referee could not differentiate between the two and Lea lost again.

From August towards the end of 2009, Paul became embroiled in a rivalry with backstage interviewer Gregory Helms, over whether he was also in-ring performer The Hurricane. They agreed to settle the matter in a match on 17 November episode of ECW, which saw Hurricane's mask put up against Burchill's career on the ECW brand. Despite many attempts, Paul could not secure the pin and subsequently lost the match, resulting in both he and Katie Lea leaving ECW. The following week on ECW, Katie Lea and Paul, now sporting masks and calling themselves The Beautiful Nightmare and The Ripper, respectively, appeared in a backstage segment with General Manager Tiffany and asked for a contract, which Tiffany said they would receive if The Ripper could defeat The Hurricane the next week on ECW. However, The Ripper was unmasked by Hurricane and subsequently defeated in their match, resulting in Katie and Burchill remaining off ECW.

On 11 January 2010, Lea moved back to the Raw brand without her brother Paul Burchill, by competing in a first round tournament match for the vacant Divas Championship but lost to Eve Torres. At the Royal Rumble pay-per-view, Katie Lea teamed up with Maryse, Natalya, Hall, and Alicia Fox in a losing effort to the team of Kim, Kelly Kelly, Eve Torres, and The Bella Twins. On 26 February, Paul was formally released by WWE leaving Katie to appear on her own, but she was released from her WWE contract two months later, on 22 April, ending her five-year tenure with the company.

=== Total Nonstop Action Wrestling (2010–2012) ===
==== Knockouts Tag Team Champion (2010–2011) ====
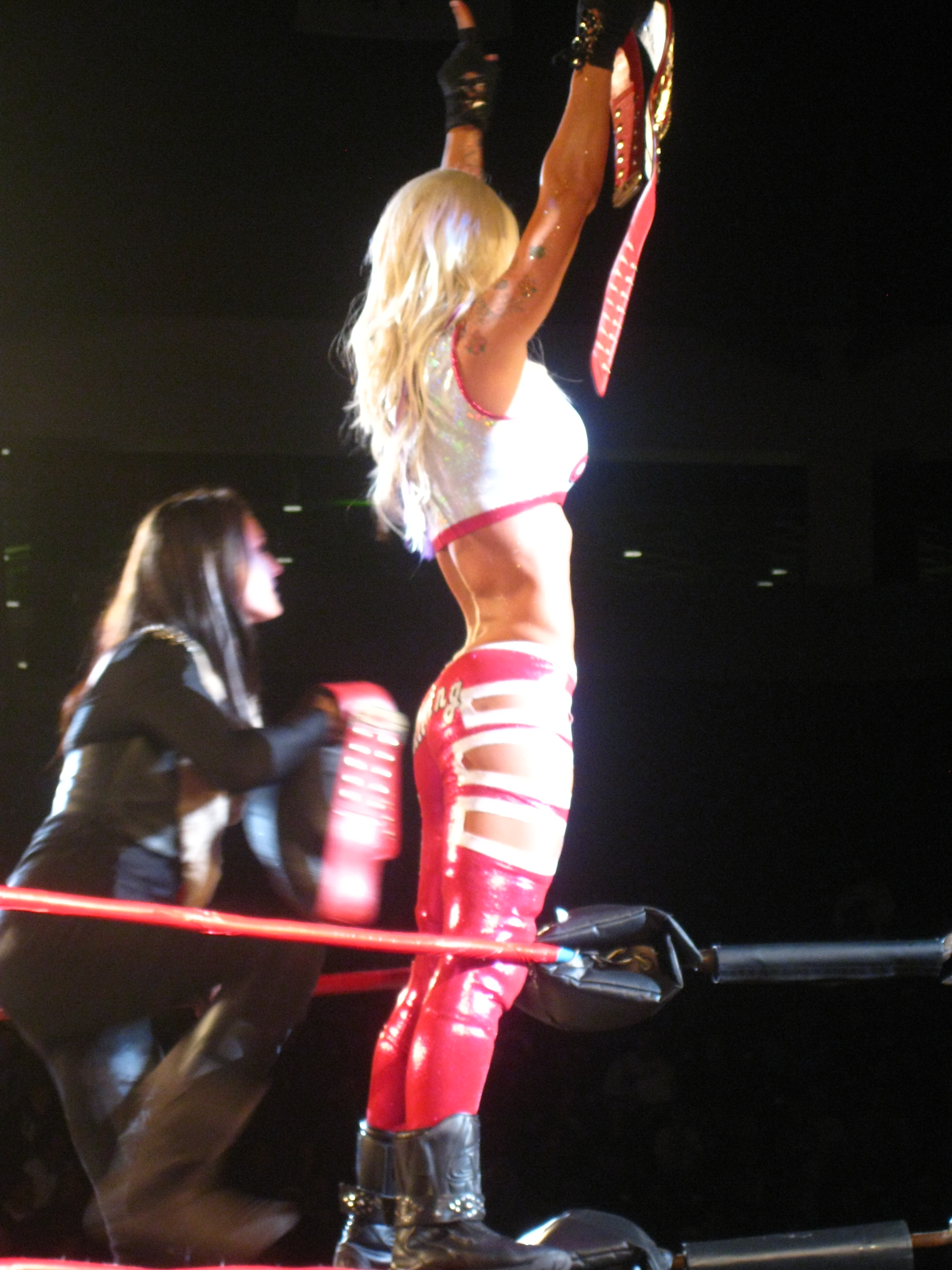
Waters (left) posing in the ring alongside Angelina Love during a TNA live event in 2010

After her release from WWE, Waters briefly returned to the independent circuit, wrestling under the ring name Kat La Noir. On 23 August 2010 Waters wrestled in a tryout dark match for TNA at the tapings of their Impact television show, losing to Madison Rayne; it was reported on 15 October that TNA had signed her to a contract. Waters debuted on 21 October episode of Impact!, using the name Winter, admiring Angelina Love during a backstage segment in a somewhat supernatural appearance. After weeks of appearing only in front of Love, Winter was seen for the first time by other Knockouts on 25 November episode of Impact! when she saved Love during a large backstage brawl. On 9 December at the tapings of 23 December episode of Impact! Winter replaced an injured Velvet Sky and teamed with Love in a tournament final, where they defeated Madison Rayne and Tara to win the TNA Knockouts Tag Team Championship. On the edition of 13 January of Impact!, Angelina and Winter successfully defend their championship against Madison Rayne and Tara after Winter knocked out Tara with a dragon sleeper. On the edition of 27 January of Impact!, Winter brawled with Velvet Sky, who claimed she was trying to break up The Beautiful People. On the edition of 3 March of Impact!, Cookie and Robbie E aligned themselves with former Jersey Shore cast member Angelina Pivarnick, with whom they bonded through their mutual dislike of Jenni "JWoww" Farley, whom Pivarnick proceeded to challenge to a match (whom was replaced by Winter). The following week, Winter, Angelina Love and Velvet Sky defeated Cookie, Angelina Pivarnick and Sarita in a six knockout tag team match. Winter and Love lost the Knockouts Tag Team Championship to Mexican America (Sarita and Rosita) on 13 March at Victory Road, after an interference by Velvet Sky backfired. On the following episode of Impact!, Winter and Angelina Love teamed up with Matt Morgan where they defeated Mexican America (Rosita, Sarita, Hernandez) in a six-person street fight, After the match, the "fan", who had interfered in Morgan's match at Victory Road, once again entered the ring and attacked Morgan.

==== Knockouts Champion and departure (2011–2012) ====
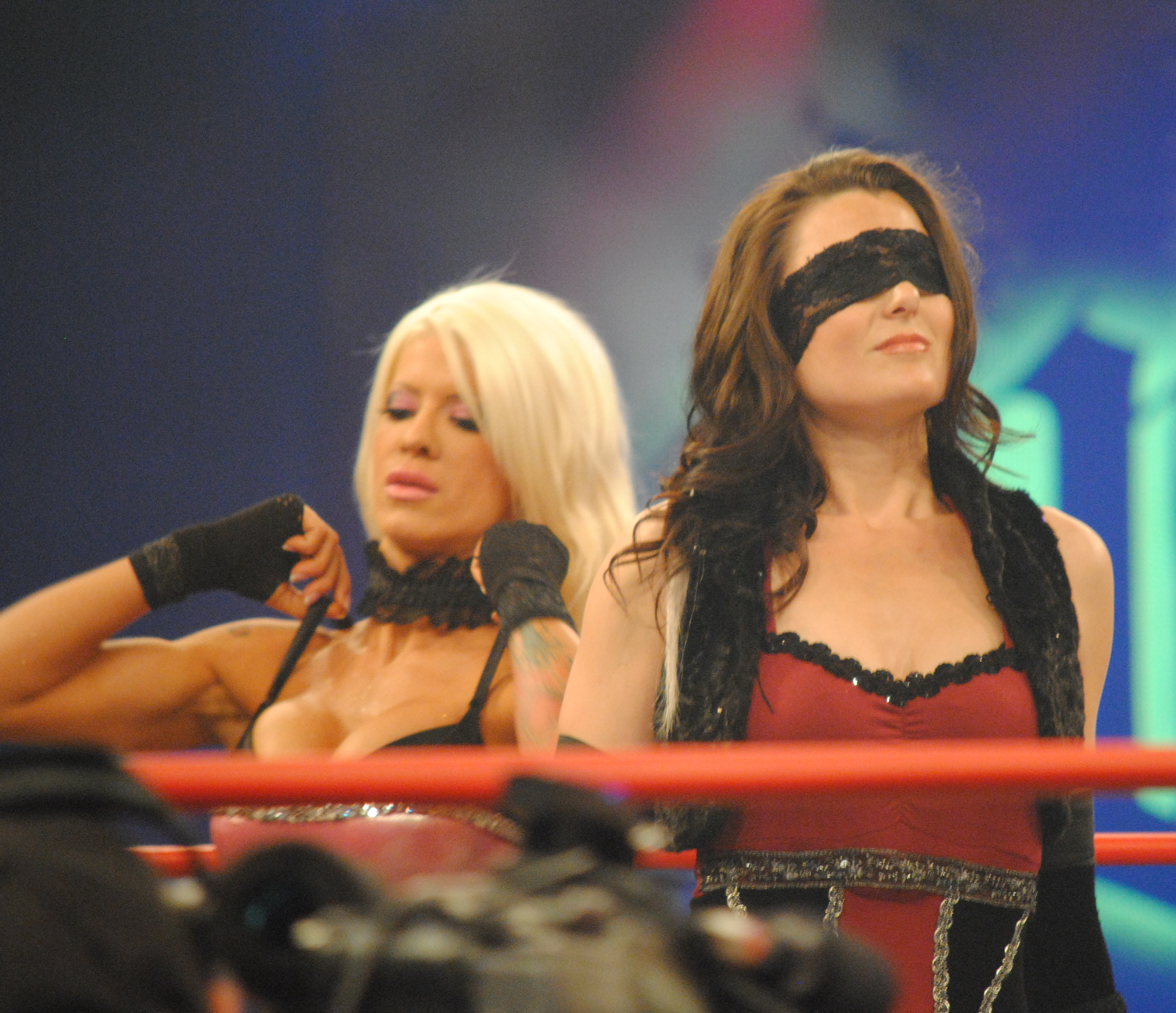
Angelina Love (left) and Winter during Victory Road (2011).

On the edition of 24 March of Impact!, Winter, seemingly having control over Love's actions, prevented her from saving Sky from a beatdown at the hands of Sarita and Rosita, turning her heel in the process. On the edition of 7 April of Impact!, Love, still under Winter's spell, turned on Sky during a Knockouts Tag Team Championship match against Sarita and Rosita and left her to be pinned by the champions. On the edition of 23 June of Impact Wrestling, Winter defeated TNA Women's Knockout Champion Mickie James in a non-title Street Fight, following outside interference from Love, earning her a shot at James' Knockouts Championship. On 7 August at Hardcore Justice, Winter defeated James, with help from Love, to win the Knockouts Championship for the first time. With the win, she became the first British Knockouts Champion and became the sixth Knockout (after Angelina Love, Awesome Kong, Madison Rayne, Taylor Wilde and Tara) to have held both the Knockouts Championship and Knockouts Tag Team Championship. On 25 August at the tapings of the edition of 1 September of Impact Wrestling, Winter lost the Knockouts Championship back to Mickie James, ending her reign at just 18 days. On 11 September at No Surrender, Winter regained the title from James. On 16 October at Bound for Glory, Winter lost the title to Velvet Sky in a four-way match, which also included Madison Rayne and Mickie James and was refereed by Karen Jarrett. On 12 January 2012 episode of Impact Wrestling, Winter lost to ODB. After saving ODB from Love and Winter, Eric Young was challenged by Love to a match. Young won the match via disqualification, after Love kicked him in the groin. This led to a tag team match, on 26 January episode of Impact Wrestling, with Love and Winter losing to ODB and Eric Young. Winter and Love appeared together for the first time in five months, on 14 June, at an Impact house show in Belton, Texas, when they teamed up with Rosita and Sarita in a losing effort against Mickie James, Tara, and Velvet Sky in the main event four-on-three handicap match after Sky pinned Rosita for the win. Waters left TNA shortly afterward.

=== Independent circuit (2011–2018) ===
On 25 February 2011 Waters made her debut at World Independent Ladies Division in a in ring segment with Tab Jackson and Aiden Riley. On 4 August 2011, Waters defeated Tab Jackson in a no holds barred match to win the vacant WILD World Championship. On 10 December 2011 Winter defeated Terra, this match was later named 2011 match of the year. On 2 February 2012 she became the longest reigning champion with her reign surpassing the previous record of Lucky O'Shea's 182 days.

On 14 May 2011 at the FWE Meltdown pay-per-view, Waters made her debut for Family Wrestling Entertainment (FWE), defeating Rosita. At the FWE Empire City Showdown pay-per-view, on 20 September 2011, Winter defeated Rosita with Christy Hemme as the special guest referee. At the FWE Fallout pay-per-view, on 15 November 2011, Winter defeated Rosita with Christy Hemme as the special guest referee. At the FWE Haastility pay-per-view, on 15 December 2011, Winter defeated Jackie Haas. Then, at FWE No Limits, Winter defeated Brooke Tessmacher in the first round, before losing to Maria Kanellis, after the interference from TnT (Tara and Brooke Tessmacher), in a tournament to determinate the first ever FWE Women's Champion. Month later, on 24 March, Waters defeated Maria and fellow TNA Knockout Rosita in a three-way match to win the FWE Women's Championship for the first time. On 28 April, Waters defeated Melina with Lita as the special guest referee to retain the FWE Women's Championship. Later Maria challenged Winter to a rematch and Winter accepted On 28 July 2012 episode of FWE Wrestling, Winter dropped the FWE Women's Championship back to Maria Kanellis, making Maria a two-time champion. On 4 October 2012 at the Back 2 Brooklyn pay-per-view, Waters, under the name Katarina Leigh, teamed up with Maria in losing effort to The Beautiful People (Angelina Love and Velvet Sky) in a tag team match. After the match ended, Waters was attacked by the evil Ivelisse Velez, who was making her FWE debut.

Winter made her debut for House of Hardcore, on 6 October 2012 at the promotion's first show, where she lost to Jazz in a singles match. Under the name Katarina Leigh, she participated in Pro Wrestling Syndicate's Bombshells Championship tournament making the final where she was eliminated last by Missy Sampson in a four-way elimination match.

In October 2016, Leigh wrestled for What Culture Pro Wrestling in the UK, unsuccessfully challenging for the WCPW Women's Championship.

=== Return to Impact Wrestling (2018–2019) ===
Leigh made her return to Impact Wrestling under a new name, Katarina, on 10 May episode as Grado's new girlfriend. At Impact Wrestling One Night Only: Zero Fear which aired on 15 June 2018, Katarina unsuccessfully challenged Su Yung for the Impact Knockouts Championship. Katarina turned heel on 6 September episode of Impact!, when she dumped and insulted Grado and announced that she was in love with Grado's best friend, Joe Hendry, only for Hendry to turn Katarina down after she kissed him.

=== Women of Wrestling (2017–2019) ===
Waters made her debut for Women of Wrestling (WOW) during their taping in October 2018, under the name The Temptress, as she aligned herself with The Dagger. On WOW's seventh episode that aired on AXS TV on 1 March 2019, The Temptress defeated Fire. The Temptress, along with The Dagger, have feuded with Fire and Keta Rush. The Temptress, along with the Dagger, competed in the WOW World Tag Team Championship tournament at the second season on AXS TV, however, were eliminated on the first round by losing to Adrenaline and Fire

== Acting career ==
Waters has acted in several films. She has had roles in such films as Amanda & The Guardian, 24 Hours in Vegas, and playing a special forces operative in the zombie apocalypse thriller, Redcon-1. She also had a recurring role on Emergency: L.A. as a police officer named Dana Lewis.

Since 2011, she has also served as a horror host of Katarina's Nightmare Theater, a line of DVD editions for vintage cult horror films released by Scorpion Releasing.

Waters appeared in the 2021 horror film, The Amityville Moon, as the evil Sister Francis.

== Personal life ==
Waters was born and raised in West Germany (which later became Germany after reunification) before relocating to England to attend university. Waters graduated with a Bachelor of Arts with honours in film and drama. She is fluent in both English and German. As well as wrestling, Waters had a small career in film, directing the British independent film Welcome To Hell and acting in Utopian Pictures' Tough Justice as Tara Hunt and as "Stripper #1" in TVyouno.com film 24 Hours in Las Vegas, Zoe in Go Green, Valerie in Bad Pixel and as the Serpent Queen in the 2012 film Amanda and the Guardian, which was never released. Waters also appears, along with Shelly Martinez, in the music video for "Miss Outta Control" by Electrolightz. Her biggest influence in the wrestling world is Kevin Nash.

As well as in film, Waters has made some small television appearances. She appeared on the pilot showcase programme Comedy Lab in 2002. Her role saw her performing wrestling moves during "Karma Chameleon", as sung by the then relatively unknown Russell Brand. In 2003, she appeared on an episode of Fort Boyard under her ringname Nikita. As she was appearing in the Frontier Wrestling Alliance at the time, her teammates included Doug Williams, Paul Burchill and World Association of Wrestling's Sweet Saraya. Waters favorite's are wrestlers Jonny Storm, Darren Burridge, Alex Shane, television shows La Femme Nikita and Smallville, Waters also cited that "I am totally obsessed with Lex Luthor". Waters has studied film and drama for three years.

In an April 2015 interview with Vince Russo as well as an October 2019 tweet for National Coming Out Day, Waters described herself as pansexual, polyamorous, and a relationship anarchist. On 7 July 2022, Waters announced via Instagram that she became an American citizen.

== Filmography ==
Film and television as an actor

Year	Title	Role	Notes
2004	Comedy Lab	Self; professional wrestler	1 episode
2005	The Men in White	Mae Nixon	
2006	Hi!jab	Woman with Hijab	Short film
2006	The Russell Brand Show	Self; guest	1 episode
2008	WWE Hall of Fame 2008	Self; audience	TV special
2009	WWE Hall of Fame 2009	Self; audience	TV special
2011	Go Green	Zoe	Short film
2011	Amanda & The Guardian	The Serpent Queen	
2011	24 Hours in Las Vegas	Stripper #1	
2011	Out of Commission	Christy	
2012	Bad Pixels	Valerie	
2013	Creative Continuity	Self; guest	1 episode, web series
2013	TeleviSean	Natasha	
2013	Doritos Circus	Gypsy	Comedy short
2014	Crossroads	The German	Assistant producer
2014	Tinker Steampunk	Verdalet Merewood	1 episode
2014	Fantasy Women Battles	Alvida The Pirate	
2014	The Treehouse	Cleopatra	
2014	Zombies in the Basement	Dusty	Short film
2015	Cat's Eyes: Rebecca Holden on The 'Sisterhood'	Self; interviewee	Documentary
2015	John Constantine: Hellblazer	Queenie	Horror short
2015	Fantasy	Knight	Short film
2015	Jungle Justice	Cutler	1 episode
2015	Chapter 1: Charlie	Drum	Horror short
2015	Gospel	Vengeance	Short film
2016	To Tell The Truth	Self; contestant	1 episode
2016	Coyote Munch Mini-Mart	Instructor	2 episodes
2016	Karate Kill	Simona	
2016	Sorta Mortal Kombat	Evil Overlord	TV Movie
2016	Unconscionable	Cassandra Black	Executive producer
2016	Brody	Anna	Comedy short
2016	Fight or Die	Lily	1 episode
2017	Sickness	Simone Foster	
2017	Welcome to Tremahia	Amalthea	Associate producer
2018	Lucha VaVoom: Inside America's Most Outrageous Show	Self; wrestler	Documentary
2018	Killing Joan	Donna	
2018	Scratch	Sheila	
2018	Middle of the Night	Detective	
2018	Coach's Wrestling Class	The Secret Weapon	Comedy short
2018	Redcon-1	Sgt. Kira Paige	
2018	The Original Play James Play	Rachel	
2020	A.P. Bio	Pro Wrestler	1 episode
2020	EFT: Equality Through Freedom	Agent Ramsey	Sci-Fi short
2021	The Other Side of the Ring	Self; feature	Documentary
2021	Now and Then	Susanna Leichenberg	Drama short
2021	The Amityville Moon	Sister Francis	
2021	The Me and You Show	Chairhead	1 episode
2021	Portals	Laurie	Sci-Fi short
2023	Malady	The Boss	
2023	Lion-Girl	Devil Gemini	
2023	Emergency: LA	Officer Dana Lewis	13 episodes
2024	Blackout	Bartender	Drama short
2025	Sorority of the Damned	Earth Witch	
2025	Night Carnage	Werewolf	

Film and television as a director

Year	Title	Role	Notes
2011	Katarina's Nightmare Theatre	Host, executive producer	36 episodes
2013	Relax California Style	Host, executive producer	
2014	Til Death Do We Decieve	Producer	Drama short
2014	Red Light Diaries	Producer	Short film
2022	Dead Man's Hand	Producer	Drama short
TBA	Ensnared	Producer	In Post-Production

Podcasts

Year	Title	Role	Notes
2025	Ring The Belle	Herself	1 episode

== Championships and accomplishments ==
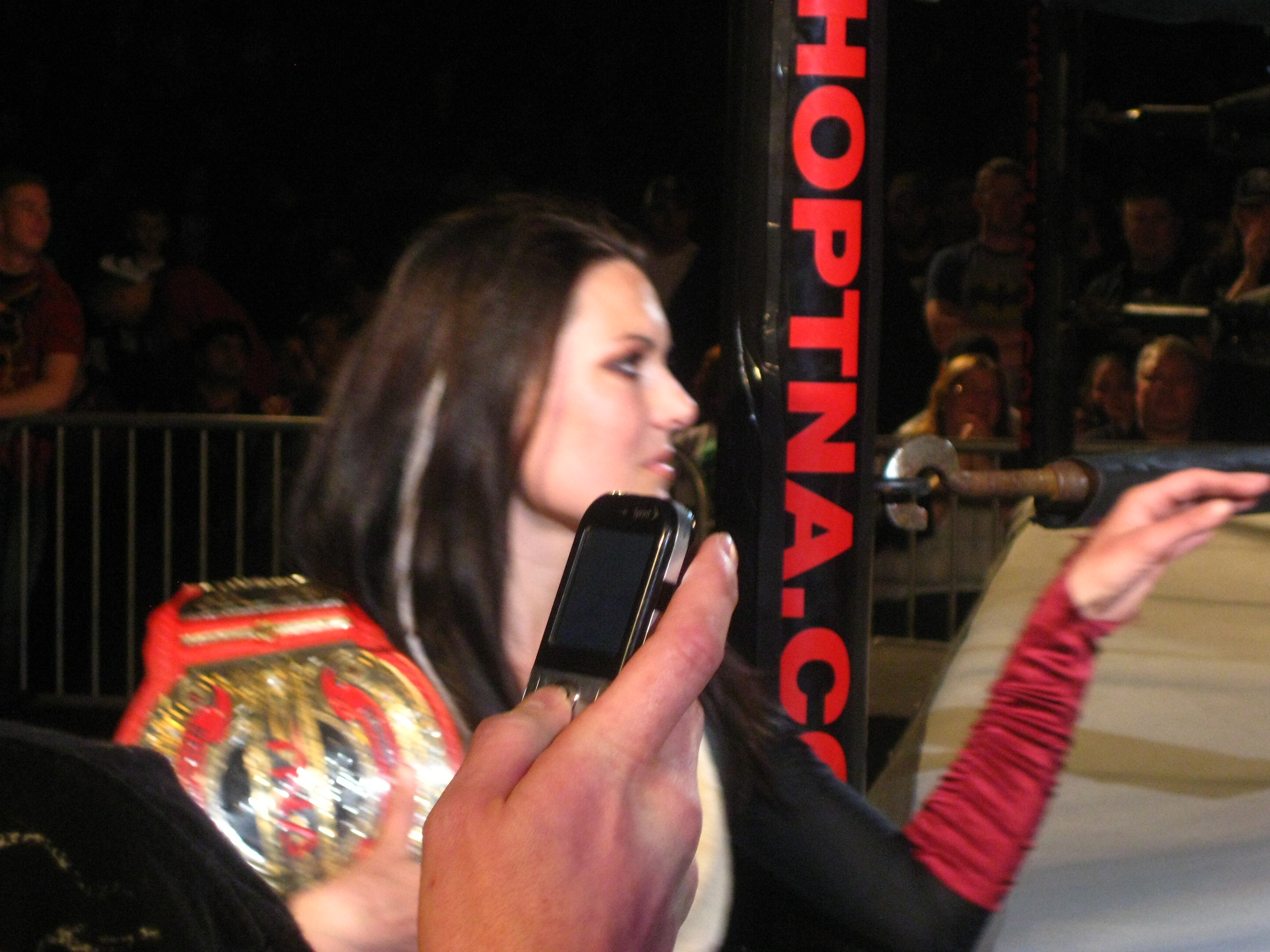
Waters is a one-time TNA Knockouts Tag Team Champion

- British Empire Wrestling
  - British Empire Woman's Championship (1 time)
- British Independent Circuit
  - British Women's Championship (3 times)
- Family Wrestling Entertainment
  - FWE Women's Championship (1 time)
- Hoodslam
  - GLAM Championship (1 time)
  - GLAM Championship Tournament (2020)
- Maverick Pro Wrestling
  - MPW Women's Championship (2 times, final)
- Ohio Valley Wrestling
  - OVW Women's Championship (2 times)
- Pro Wrestling Illustrated
  - Ranked No. 18 of the best 50 female singles wrestlers in the PWI Female 50 in 2012
- Queens of Chaos
  - World Queens of Chaos Championship (1 time)
- Total Nonstop Action Wrestling
  - TNA Knockouts Championship (2 times)
  - TNA Knockouts Tag Team Championship (1 time) – with Angelina Love
  - TNA Knockouts Tag Team Championship Tournament (2010) – with Angelina Love
- Trans-Atlantic Wrestling
  - TWC Women's Championship (1 time)
- World Independent Ladies Division Wrestling
  - WILD World Championship (1 time)
  - WILD Warrior of the Year (2011)
  - WILD Match of the Year (2011) vs. Terra Calaway
