= Redcon-1 =

- Directed by: Chee Keong Cheung
- Produced by: Kevin Eastman; Carlos Gallardo; Rob Weston
- Starring: Katarina Waters
- Production company: Intense Productions
- Distributed by: Epic Pictures (United States); 101 Films (United Kingdom)
- Release date: 28 September 2018 (UK)
- Running time: 117 minutes
- Country: United Kingdom
- Language: English

Redcon-1 (also known as Redcon-1 - Army of the Dead) is a 2018 British action horror film directed by Chee Keong Cheung. It stars Katarina Waters, Mark Strange, and Carlos Gallardo. The film was produced by Gallardo and Kevin Eastman. Working titles for the film included Zombie Apocalypse and Zombie City. It is Gallardo's second zombie movie. The film was released in the UK on 28 September 2018.

Redcon-1 centers around a joint British-American Special Forces team, trying to save a scientist from the clutches of death during a mass zombie outbreak. Unlike traditional zombies from similar franchises, the zombies in this film have retained certain human traits, being able to fight back, and use weapons.

Redcon-1 was the first movie director Chee Keong Cheung had shot in nearly a decade for his Intense Productions company.

The film received mixed reviews, though has found a cult base of horror fans that united behind its UK release.

== Plot ==
After an outbreak in a prison in southern England, a virus swept over Britain, turning people into zombies.

A joint British-American special forces squad goes into the quarantine zone to extract Dr. Julian Raynes, a scientist who is supposedly able to create a cure. After narrowing down his possible locations to four, the group, made up of Captain Stanton, Lieutenant Perez, Paige, Rodrigo and several others, travel to the locations one by one.

Reaching the first location by boat, the team discover the zombies are capable of hand-to-hand combat and utilizing objects. Fighting their way out, the team secure several vehicles and get to the second location - a set of high-rise flats.

Fighting and evading zombies, the team makes it to their target near top floor, but fails to find Dr. Raynes. Jacob, bitten on the way, commits suicide to avoid zombification. Leaving the high-rise, the team spot vehicles full of zombie soldiers who have maintained their military capabilities. The squad try to hide, but Private Bernstein is captured and taken away. Following Bernstein's tracker, the team discover a zombie army camp. They find Bernstein held in a container with many survivors - including Dr. Raynes. While covertly evacuating the survivors, the team is confronted by the zombie soldiers. A firefight breaks out, killing many survivors in the crossfire. Eventually the team gets away with Dr. Raynes and a few survivors.

Meanwhile, the squad's commanding officer, Major General Smith, discusses the outbreak with his staff. It is revealed his own son is infected and that they are experimenting on other zombies.

The squad of soldiers and survivors take shelter in a bunker. Paige admits to her boyfriend, Rodrigo, that she became infected during the earlier fight. He shares a passionate kiss with her anyway, dooming himself. The couple leave the group and head to the countryside. It is also discovered that one of the survivors, Alicia, might be immune to the virus.

Stanton, Bernstein, Perez, Dr. Raynes and Alicia arrive at the pickup point, where Smith awaits. Smith reveals that he had to kill his son. Mad with grief, Smith blamed Raynes and reveals his plan to spread the virus further, dooming the rest of humanity. Smith shoots Raynes and gets back to the helicopter whilst a firefight ensues between his security detail and the survivors. It is revealed Bernstein secretly works for Smith, who holds his parents captive. A horde approach, prompting the survivors to flee. An injured Perez remains behind but is overwhelmed and devoured.

Stanton and Alicia are captured by the prison group, and it turns out that Alicia is the daughter of the leader of the rioters, Jimmy, who died after escaping earlier in the film. Stanton checks Alicia's bite wound and sees she had other bite marks that have healed. From the journal and the knowledge that her father Jimmy was partially immune, he deduces that Alicia is can be the cure against the virus.

Stanton and Alicia escape finds a group of armed survivors near the border, with Bernstein among them. Meeting with the leader, Stanton reveals the military's plan to bomb the quarantine zone and replace it with a dictatorial government led by Smith. The survivors agree to help him cross the border.

At the border they fight a very large group of zombies and are joined by the prison gang who decided to aid them. Smith arrives and tells his men to kill everyone, but before the military can open fire, a fight ensues between him and a zombified Stanton, who manages to defeat the General. During the aftermath, Stanton is given a mercy killing by Bernstein, and Alicia is extracted from the quarantine zone, adopted by Bernstein when he returns from his mission.

== Cast ==
- Katarina Waters as Sgt Kira Paige
- Mark Strange as Lt Frank Perez
- Carlos Gallardo as Sgt Frederick Reeves
- Akira Koieyama as Sgt Simon Lau
- Oris Erhuero as Capt Marcus Stanton
- Martyn Ford as Cpl Jacob Gallagher
- Joshua Dickinson as Pvt Perry Bernstein
- Michael Sheehan as Lt Rodrigo Gonzalez
- Douglas Russell as Ivan Gavric
- Nicolette McKeown as Young Woman Stranded
- Peter Anderson as Infected
- Dougie Rankin as Zombie
- Meredith Whiting as Zombie
- Jason Redshaw as Policeman/Zombie

== Production ==
The film was shot in locations throughout both Scotland (Newtongrange, HM Prison Peterhead, Glasgow, and Ayrshire) and England (Brownsover etc.). Many locals in various cities across the UK answered casting calls to be extras, portraying the infected, the troops, gang members, and various other survivors. English amputee Olivia Story made her film debut as a zombie who removed her prosthetic limbs for a scene, and she appears alongside her father, who introduced her to acting.

== Reception ==
=== Critical response ===
According to the Movie and Television Review and Classification Board of the Philippines (MTRCB), the film contains numerous scenes depicting brutal and graphic violence and gore, and nudity and sexual activity. The Board find it not suitable for viewers below eighteen (18) years of age. The MTRCB classified the film as rated R-18.

== Home media ==
The film was released on DVD on 25 February 2019.

== Sequel ==
In a Facebook post on 25 March 2019, the producer requested fan feedback regarding a sequel.
