= Haunt Season =

2024 film directed by Jake Jarvi

- Directed by: Jake Jarvi
- Written by: Jake Jarvi
- Produced by: Jake Jarvi; Stephen Kristof; Eliza Toser; Jeremy Warner
- Starring: Brent Bentley; Craig Benzine; Ana Dragovich; Sarah Elizabeth
- Cinematography: Alexander Lakin
- Edited by: Jake Jarvi
- Music by: Rasheed Thomas
- Production company: First Fight
- Distributed by: Epic Pictures Group
- Release dates: October 4, 2024 (limited); October 8, 2024 (digital)
- Running time: 81 minutes
- Country: United States
- Language: English

Haunt Season is a 2024 horror film directed by Jake Jarvi. It had a limited theatrical release for Epic Pictures on October 4, 2024, followed by a digital release on October 8.

== Premise ==
In the middle of a Halloween attraction, a masked killer begins killing cast members.

== Cast ==
- Brent Bentley - Jace
- Craig Benzine - Seth
- Ana Dragovich - Taylor
- Sarah Elizabeth - Matilda
- Jeremy Warner - Tall John
- Katelin Stack - Rosemary
- Adam Hinkle - Danny
- Tyra Renee - Mika
- Janet Jurado - V
- Stephen Kristof - Bradford
- Cydney Moody - Celeste
- Rob Scallon - Josh
- Kelton Neals - Zade
- Tommy Martin - Walt
- Terry Holt - Stan
- Richard Grost - Dog Walker
- Samuel James Howard - Evil Clown
- Nick Weber - Chainsaw Zombie
- Nico Gallatin - Trampled Woman
- Isabella Cernuska - Halloween Sacrifice 1
- John Mistretta - Halloween Sacrifice 4
- Taryn McCandless - Pirate Mom
- Brooklyn Lehman - Pirate Kid

== Reception ==
On Chicago Reader, Andrea Thompson wrote that the film has "a surprising amount of sweetness. (...) If the drama and the derangement don’t quite mesh, it’s still a surprisingly affecting love letter to the [Halloween] season and those who live for it."

== See also ==
- List of films set around Halloween
- List of horror films of 2024
- List of holiday horror films
- Simultaneous release
