= Sevin Sins =

EP by Maria Kanellis
- Released: April 13, 2010
- Genre: Rock
- Length: 14:35
- Label: Ms. Zombie Entertainment
- Producer: Alejandro Valencia, Rene Garza

Sevin Sins is the debut EP by American singer and professional wrestler Maria Kanellis. It was released as an iTunes Store exclusive in the United States on April 13, 2010.

== Background ==
On January 28, 2010, Kanellis announced on her WWE.com blog that she would be releasing her first album Sevin Sins on April 13. She noted that the first single would be the track "Fantasy." Kanellis was released from her WWE contract on February 26, 2010. A day later, in an interview on XM Satellite Radio's the Virus program Special Delivery Starring Sam and Dave, Kanellis cited one of the reasons for her termination as disallowing WWE to have control over personal projects, specifically Sevin Sins. The EP was released April 13, 2010.

== Reception ==
Professional ratings
Review scores
Source	Rating
Diva-Dirt	2.5/5 stars
Dropkick Divas Media	C+

Diva-Dirt gave a mixed review giving a score of 2.5 out of 5, saying "Overall, it’s an interesting effort with a variety of different styles used. There is a shift in style and tone from one song to the next which I appreciate. If I’m honest, I was expecting all of the songs to be in the same Twilight-esque vain as ‘Fantasy’ but there is a nice variety that shows you different sides to Maria. The four songs gives you a nice taste of what a full album could sound like. Unlike other celebrities, I don't feel that Maria has just made a record for the hell of it — you can sense her passion for her music. I went into listening to this with low expectations and I found myself surprisingly entertained. If you are looking for deep, meaningful, original music however, it's not that". Riley Sky of Dropkick Divas Media' gave a mixed-positive review giving the EP a grade of a C+, saying "The album itself is pretty good, not great, nor bad. The self EP entitled track "Sevin Sins" was the disappointing part about the EP. Alice In Wonder Land is the best, Change Your Mind is the in between good and great, Fantasy is neutral to slightly positive, while Sevin Sins was the bad. Maria, I loved you in the ring and I love your music, but the EP needs a lot of work. The average listener likely won't dismiss listening to this EP; if it's catchy and has a great hook — it works. Hey! Its good for being released independently, besides that the EP earns an C+".

== Track listing ==
No.	Title	Writer(s)	Length
1.	"Alice in Wonderland"	Maria Kanellis, Joy Valencia, Alejandro Valencia, Rene Garza	3:03
2.	"Fantasy"	Kanellis, Mark Lonsway, A. Valencia, Garza	4:28
3.	"Change Your Mind"	Kanellis, Lonsway, A. Valencia, Garza	3:26
4.	"Sevin Sins"	Kanellis, J. Valencia, A. Valencia, Garza	3:38

== Personnel ==
- Maria Kanellis - vocals
- Rene Garza - producer, mixer
- Enrique "Bugs" Gonzalez - drums
- Jose Gurria - additional drums
- Vivi Rama - bass
- Alejandro Valencia - producer, mixer
- Joy Valencia - vocal producer
- Simone Vitucci - cello
