= Epic Pictures Group =

Film and television production company

- Type: Private
- Industry: Film
- Founded: 2007; 19 years ago in Los Angeles, California, United States
- Founders: Patrick Ewald; Shaked Berenson
- Headquarters: Hollywood, California, United States
- Services: Film and television studio
- Website: epic-pictures.com

Epic Pictures Group is an American independent film and television studio engaged in the development, financing, production and distribution of film and television. Epic Pictures produces, finances, and distributes approximately twenty-thirty independent genre films a year.

Since 2008, Epic Pictures Group has been financing and producing feature films with the goal of empowering visionary filmmakers, helping to shape their stories from script to release. Epic Pictures Group productions are filmed around the globe and vary widely in budget and genre.

In 2013, the company established Epic Pictures Releasing, which is its distribution division. In 2017, Epic Pictures acquired the horror website Dread Central, which it owned until 2026.

== History ==
Patrick Ewald and Shaked Berenson collaborated closely when they were at Crystal Sky and launched in 2004 a label for genre films call Renegade Pictures which acquired and produced horror films for the international market. The label first original production was The Devil's Chair which was acquired by Sony Pictures after its premiere screening at the midnight madness section at the Toronto International Film Festival.

Late 2007, both partners exited Crystal Sky to establish Epic Pictures. The company initially acquired film rights for the foreign market while developing features. Their first production was Dark Island which was shot in Squamish, Canada in 2008. The film was directed by Niko Pueringer and Sam Gorski who later launched Corridor Digital. Their second feature was Blood River, a third collaboration with writer Simon Boyes and director Adam Mason.

In 2009, they expended beyond genre films and financed an international version of the Russian origin animation Space Dogs 3D and produced their third and final film with duo Adam Mason and Simon Boyes, Luster. At that point Epic Pictures was also representing a variety of pictures in the international market including Jason Patric and Samantha Morton dramady Expired which premiered at Sundance 2007, and Peter Tolan's comedy Finding Amanda starring Matthew Broderick and Brittany Snow.

In 2010, Epic Pictures partnered with Valentine's Day producer Wayne Rice to produce 11-11-11. Written and directed by Darren Lynn Bousman, the supernatural horror film was scheduled to be released worldwide on Friday, November 11, 2011. While the film received mix reviews, it was considered a success internationally grossing 5.7 million dollar for a modest budget of 2.6 million. The United States, the film was sold by the directors agent to Rocket Releasing who placed the film in 17 theaters and grossed only $32,771.

In 2013, the company expended into distribution in the United States and established a subsidiary called Epic Pictures Releasing. The company first theatrical release was Big Ass Spider! on Oct 18, 2013 and was reviewed positively by critics, scoring 76% on Rotten Tomatoes

In 2014, Epic Pictures produced the romantic comedy Who Gets The Dog? together is 2DS Productions, a local company in Chicago, where the film was shot. The film was originally supposed to be directed by Steven C. Miller. Miller directed The Aggression Scale for Epic the previous year. Eventually the film was directed by Huck Botko who collaborated with 2DS Productions on his film Bad Johnson. Who Gets The Dog? received mixed reviews and was sold to Samuel Goldwyn Film.

In 2015, Epic Pictures produced four films: Turbo Kid which premiered at Sundance and won 24 awards including the Audience Award at SXSW for the Midnighters section, and a Saturn Award for Best International Film in 2016. The all-star horror anthology Tales of Halloween which premiered at the Fantasia Film Festival. The arthouse experimental drama Entertainment directed by Rick Alverson and starring Gregg Turkington and John C. Reilly. While Entertainment was widely accepted by critics and won several awards including the Environment Is Quality of Life Prize at the Locarno Festival, the film did not connect with audience and was released in the United States on VOD by Magnolia Entertainment. The micro budget JeruZalem, directed by Yoav and Doron Paz and was filmed on location in Jerusalem, Israel.

In 2016, Epic Pictures produced Day of Reckoning for Universal's Syfy channel. The film was directed by Venezuelan filmmaker Joel Novoa; The Lodgers, directed by Let's Us Prey director Brian O'Malley which premiered at the Toronto International Film Festival, and the action zombie horror film Redcon-1, written and directed by Chee Keong Cheung and produced by Teenage Mutant Ninja Turtles co-creator Kevin Eastman.

In 2017, Shaked Berenson led the acquisition of the horror website, Dread Central and launched its horror label, Dread, followed by its AVOD channel, DreadTV.

In 2019, Epic Pictures started the horror gaming site DreadXP, with a focus on editorial, reviews, podcasts, and original streaming content. In 2020, DreadXP began a video game publishing division with the launch of the Dread X Collection, an anthology of horror games in collaboration with some developers in the independent gaming space.

== Selected filmography ==
- 11-11-11 (2011)
- Bear (2010)
- Big Ass Spider! (2013)
- Blood River (2009)
- Brothers of War (2015)
- Day of Reckoning (2016)
- Deadline (2009)
- Ditched
- Dorothea (2025)
- Entertainment (2015)
- Expired (2009)
- Finding Amanda (2009)
- Haunt Season (2024)
- JeruZalem (2015)
- Killer Pad (2007)
- Louder Than Words (2015)
- Mall (2015)
- Nina Forever (2015)
- Radius (2017)
- Redbad (2018) (only North America)
- Redcon-1 (2018)
- Slapface (2021)
- Someone Marry Barry (2015)
- Space Dog: Adventure To The Moon (2015)
- Sushi Girl (2012)
- Tales of Halloween (2015)
- Thale (2012)
- The Aggression Scale (2012)
- The Good Life (2007)
- The Lodgers (2017)
- The Monster Project (2017)
- Turbo Kid (2015)
- V/H/S (2012)
- V/H/S: Viral (2015)
- Vikingdom (2013)
- Zombeavers (2015)
- Redcon-1 (2019)
- Benny Loves You (2019)
- The Curse of Audrey Earnshaw (2020)
- Polaris (2022)
- The Jester (2023)
- Haunt Season (2024)
- A Knight's War (2025)
- The Mortuary Assistant (2026)
