= Bobby Cruise =

American professional wrestling ring announcer

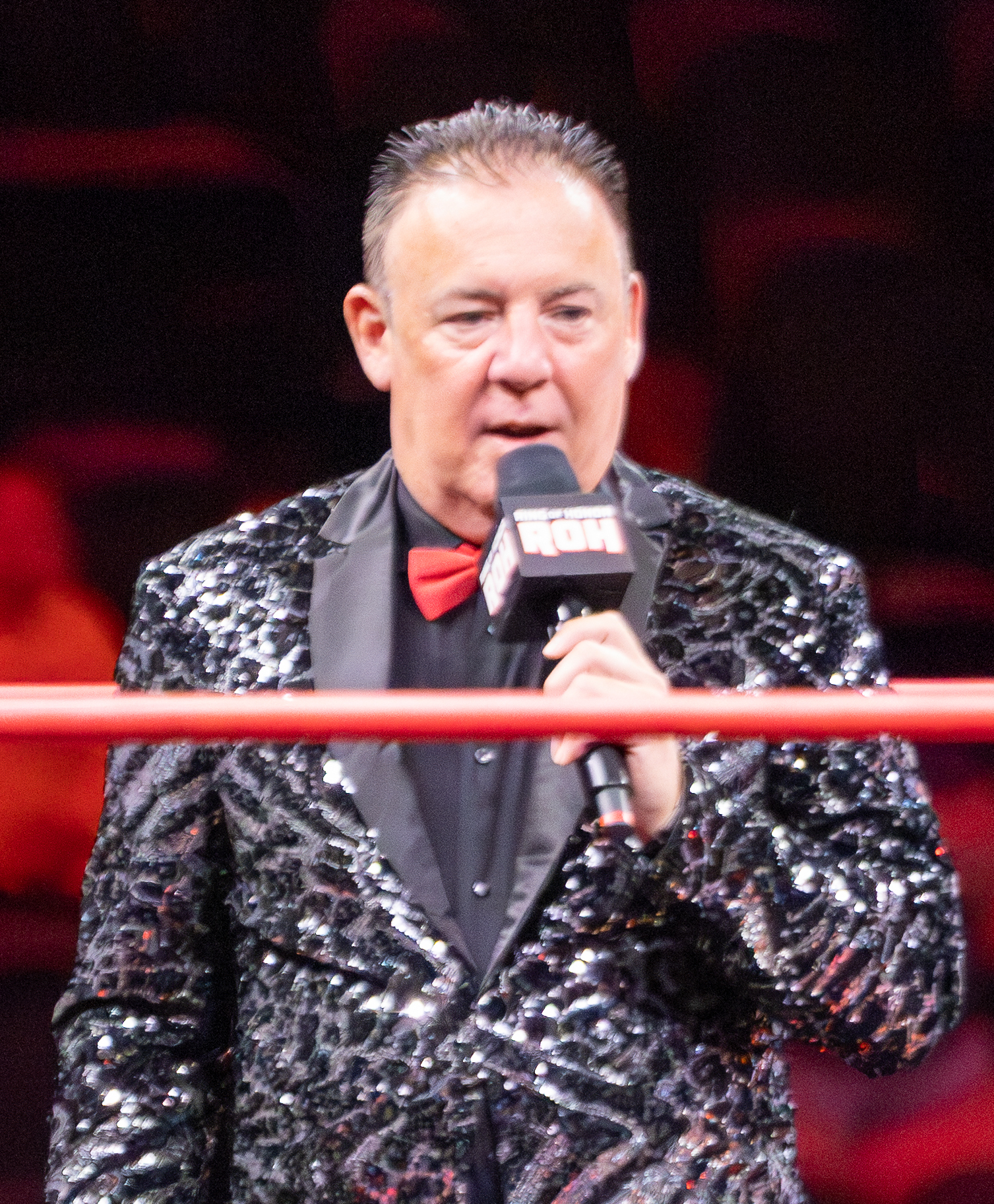
- Cruise in May 2026

Personal information
- Born: February 28, 1973 (age 53) Rochester, Massachusetts, U.S.

Professional wrestling career
- Ring name: Bobby Cruise
- Billed height: 5 ft 9 in (1.75 m)
- Billed from: Boston, Massachusetts

Bobby Cruise (born February 28, 1973) is an American professional wrestling ring announcer, signed to All Elite Wrestling (AEW), where he serves as the ring announcer for their Collision show. He also serves as the ring announcer for Ring of Honor.

== Career ==
Cruise began his career on the independent circuit in New England in 1994.

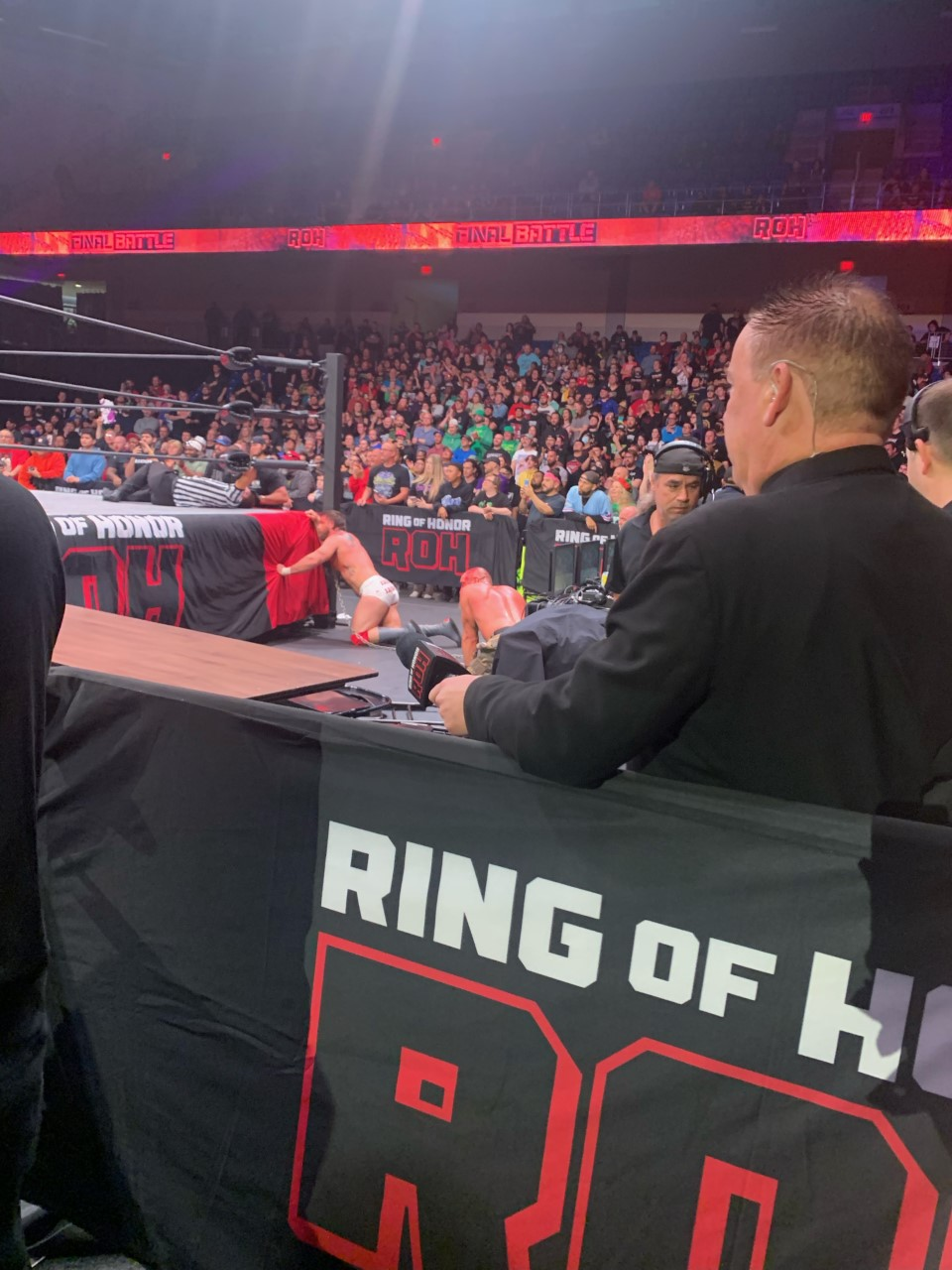
Bobby Cruise at Final Battle (2022)

=== Ring of Honor (2003–present) ===
He joined Ring of Honor in 2003, assuming the role of Steve Corino's personal ring announcer. He later became the promotion's main announcer. In 2018, Cruise also served as ring announcer at All In.

When Tony Khan purchased the company in 2022, Cruise remained the announcer, making his PPV return at Supercard of Honor XV.

=== All Elite Wrestling (2022–present) ===
Tony Khan announced AEW's purchase of Ring of Honor on March 2, 2022. During the year, various Ring of Honor Championships were defended on AEW Dynamite and AEW Rampage, with Cruise being the ring announcer. On April 6, 2022, Cruise made his AEW Dynamite debut, announcing a match between FTR and The Young Bucks.

Starting in April 2024, Cruise became the ring announcer for Collision after previous announcer Dasha Gonzalez quietly left that position.

== Championships and accomplishments ==
- New England Pro Wrestling Hall of Fame
  - Class of 2015
