= WrestleMania XIX =

2003 World Wrestling Entertainment pay-per-view event

- Promotional poster featuring the Space Needle among various WWE wrestlers
- Promotion: World Wrestling Entertainment
- Brand(s): Raw; SmackDown!
- Date: March 30, 2003
- City: Seattle, Washington
- Venue: Safeco Field
- Attendance: 54,097
- Buy rate: 560,000
- Tagline: Dare to Dream

Pay-per-view chronology
← Previous; No Way Out	Next → Backlash

WrestleMania chronology
← Previous; X8	Next → XX

WrestleMania XIX was a 2003 professional wrestling pay-per-view (PPV) event produced by World Wrestling Entertainment (WWE). It was the 19th annual WrestleMania and took place on March 30, 2003, at Safeco Field in Seattle, Washington, marking the first WrestleMania held in the U.S. state of Washington. WrestleMania XIX was the first WrestleMania to be promoted under the WWE name after the promotion was renamed from World Wrestling Federation (WWF) to WWE in May 2002, making this the first WrestleMania of the Ruthless Aggression Era. It was also the first WrestleMania to take place after WWE introduced the brand extension in March 2002, in which the roster was divided between the Raw and SmackDown! brands; the event was held for wrestlers from both.

The marquee match from the SmackDown! brand, which was the main event, saw Brock Lesnar win the WWE Championship from defending champion Kurt Angle. The marquee match from the Raw brand was the third and final WrestleMania bout between The Rock and "Stone Cold" Steve Austin (after XV and X-Seven), which The Rock won, marking Austin's final match before his retirement from in-ring performance due to injuries sustained in previous years (although Austin would return for a one-off main event match 19 years later against Kevin Owens at WrestleMania 38 in 2022).

The other primary match from the Raw brand saw Triple H retain the World Heavyweight Championship against Booker T, while other matches on the undercard included Shawn Michaels, in his first WrestleMania since WrestleMania XIV in 1998, defeating Chris Jericho, Hulk Hogan defeating Mr. McMahon in a street fight billed "20 Years in the Making", and The Undertaker defeating the team of Big Show and A-Train in a handicap match.

A record-breaking 54,097 fans from all 50 states and numerous countries around the world at Safeco Field resulted in ticket earnings of $2.76 million. The official theme song for the event was "Crack Addict" by Limp Bizkit, who appeared at the event to perform the song; the band also performed their song "Rollin' (Air Raid Vehicle)" during The Undertaker's entrance.

== Production ==
=== Background ===
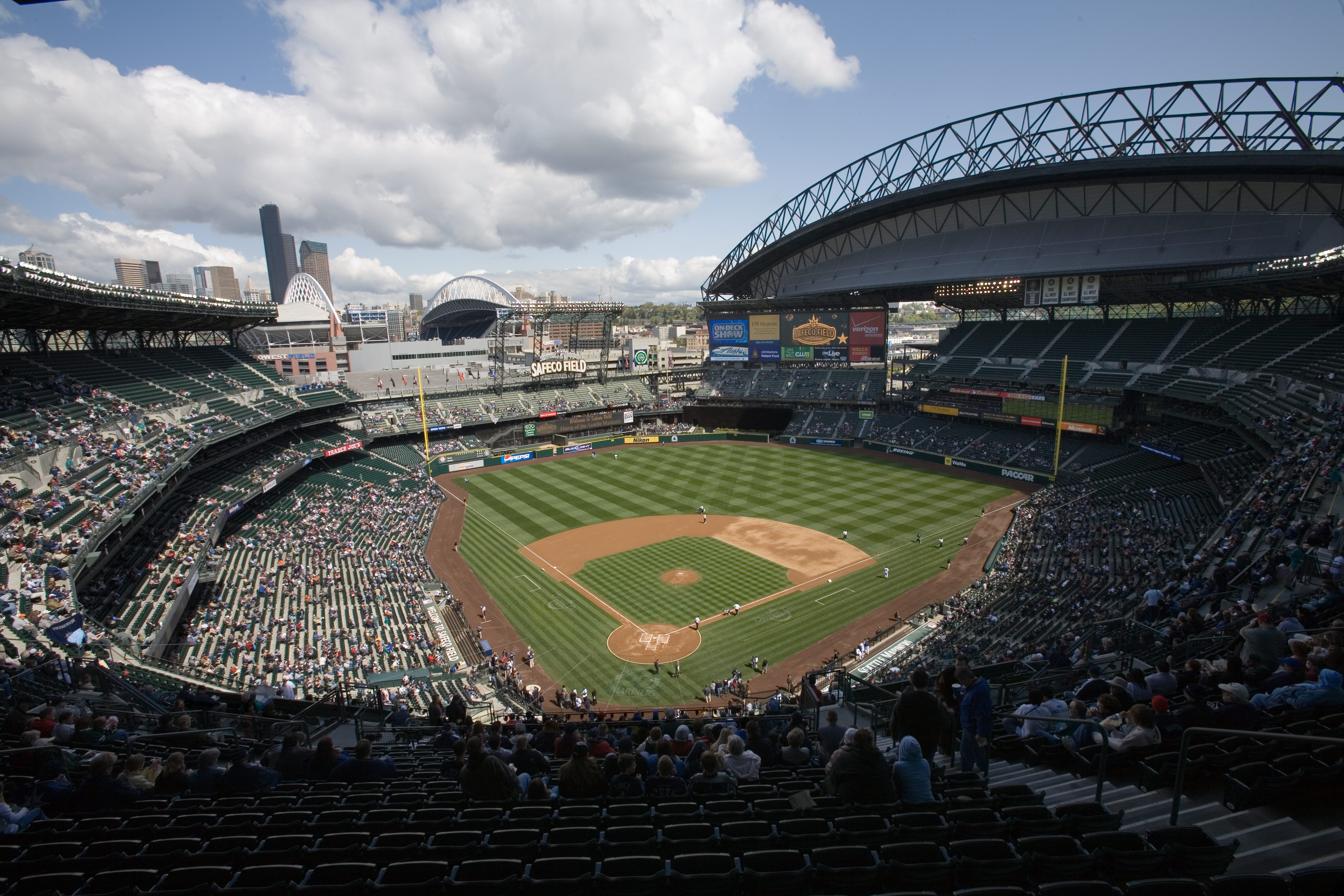
The event was held at Safeco Field in Seattle, Washington.

WrestleMania is considered World Wrestling Entertainment's (WWE) flagship professional wrestling pay-per-view (PPV) event, having first been held in 1985. It has become the longest-running professional wrestling event in history and is held annually between mid-March to mid-April. It was the first of WWE's original four pay-per-views, which includes Royal Rumble, SummerSlam, and Survivor Series, referred to as the "Big Four", and was considered one of the "Big Five" PPVs with the addition of King of the Ring in 1993 until it was discontinued as an annual PPV after its June 2002 event. WrestleMania XIX was held on March 30, 2003, at Safeco Field in Seattle, Washington. It was the first and so far only WrestleMania held in the U.S. state of Washington.

WrestleMania XIX was the first WrestleMania promoted under the WWE name, following the company being renamed from World Wrestling Federation (WWF) to WWE in May 2002 following a lawsuit from the World Wildlife Fund over the "WWF" initials. It was also the first WrestleMania to be held under the company's original brand extension that began in March 2002, which split the roster between the Raw and SmackDown! brands, where wrestlers were exclusively assigned to perform on their respective shows; WrestleMania XIX featured wrestlers from both brands. It was also the first WrestleMania to feature the World Heavyweight Championship that was introduced for Raw in September 2002 after the WWE Undisputed Championship became exclusive to SmackDown! and truncated to WWE Championship.

A documentary entitled The Mania of WrestleMania was filmed live during the event and released the following year. It was the first sole production from WWE Films. WrestleMania XIX also marked the first time that production equipment was suspended from the underside of Safeco Field's roof (while in the closed position) with WWE suspending their lighting truss system from it.

=== Storylines ===
The main feud heading into WrestleMania on the SmackDown! brand was between Kurt Angle and Brock Lesnar, with the two feuding over the WWE Championship. Angle won the title three months prior at Armageddon by defeating then-champion Big Show with Lesnar's help; Lesnar had lost the title at Survivor Series in November 2002 after his agent, Paul Heyman, betrayed him and assisted Big Show in winning the match. On the episode of SmackDown! immediately following Armageddon, Angle revealed that he too had taken on Heyman as his agent, and together they would ensure Lesnar never received an opportunity to regain the WWE Championship. Lesnar responded by brutally attacking Angle at the end of the show, injuring Angle's knee.

At the Royal Rumble, Angle faced Chris Benoit for his championship, while Lesnar was forced to wrestle Big Show for a spot in the Royal Rumble match, which guaranteed the winner a shot at his brand's championship at WrestleMania. Angle defeated Benoit by submission to retain his title. Lesnar defeated Big Show, despite interference from Heyman, to win his way into the Royal Rumble, which he entered at number 29 and won after last eliminating The Undertaker. The following month at No Way Out, Lesnar and Benoit defeated Team Angle (Kurt Angle, Shelton Benjamin, and Charlie Haas) in a handicap match. During No Way Out, Edge was supposed to team up with Lesnar and Benoit to wrestle Team Angle in the scheduled six man tag team match, but Edge was attacked backstage and it was announced he could not participate in the match. In reality, Edge had suffered a severe neck injury prior to the event, and needed time off for surgery. On the March 6 episode of SmackDown!, Lesnar defeated Heyman in a steel cage match to earn a WWE Championship match against Angle. On the March 13 episode of SmackDown!, Angle defeated Lesnar to retain the WWE Championship. Before the match began, Kurt, who was "praying" in the corner, switched places with his brother Eric. Lesnar then came out and the match began. Shortly after the match began, Lesnar nailed the imposter with an F-5 and attempted a pinfall. Lesnar then broke his own pinfall attempt after quickly realizing that his opponent in the ring was not Kurt Angle. Shelton Benjamin and Charlie Haas then came to the ring and distracted Lesnar, which gave Eric time to switch back with Kurt. As Lesnar regained his focus, Kurt was able to pin him with a small package for the win. The following week on the March 20 episode of SmackDown!, SmackDown! General Manager Stephanie McMahon told Angle that, at WrestleMania, if he tried to get himself disqualified, counted out or if Benjamin, Haas, Heyman, Eric or anyone tried to interfere in their match on Angle's behalf, he would lose the title.

The main feud on the Raw brand was between The Rock and "Stone Cold" Steve Austin. On the February 20 episode of SmackDown!, The Rock returned to WWE after a six-month hiatus from wrestling (his last appearance being at SummerSlam the previous August). On that evening, he was involved in a confrontation with Hulk Hogan before their WrestleMania X8 rematch at No Way Out, officially turning heel in the process. At No Way Out, The Rock defeated Hogan with the help of Mr. McMahon. On the February 24 episode of Raw, The Rock moved to the Raw brand and competed in a 20-man battle royal that would determine the number one contender for the World Heavyweight Championship. The Rock, however, lost after he was eliminated by Booker T. The Rock would go on to criticize Austin for being chosen as the "Superstar of the Decade" by WWE fans in January, beginning the feud between them. On the March 3 episode of Raw, Austin, who had left the company during the summer of 2002 before returning at No Way Out, made his WWE television return. As Austin was cutting a promo, he was interrupted by The Rock, who challenged him to a match at WrestleMania, with Rock admitting he was obsessed with not beating Austin at a WrestleMania event, since The Rock had lost their two previous encounters at WrestleMania XV and X-Seven, respectively. As soon as the challenge was made, Raw General Manager Eric Bischoff announced that the following week on Raw, The Rock would face Booker T in a match, and if The Rock won, he would have the choice to face either Austin or challenge Triple H for the World Heavyweight Championship at WrestleMania. On the March 10 episode of Raw, The Rock, with Bischoff's approval, announced that he would pick his own opponent for later that night, which turned out to be The Hurricane, in hopes for The Rock to gain an easy victory. However, during the match, Austin made his way down the entrance ramp, which distracted The Rock and allowed The Hurricane to roll up The Rock into a successful pinfall, thus making the match between Austin and The Rock at WrestleMania official. On the March 24 episode of Raw, Austin was banned from entering the arena, as The Rock proceeded to perform the first ever "Rock Concert" that night. However, he managed to enter the arena and attack The Rock during the segment before The Rock fled the ring.

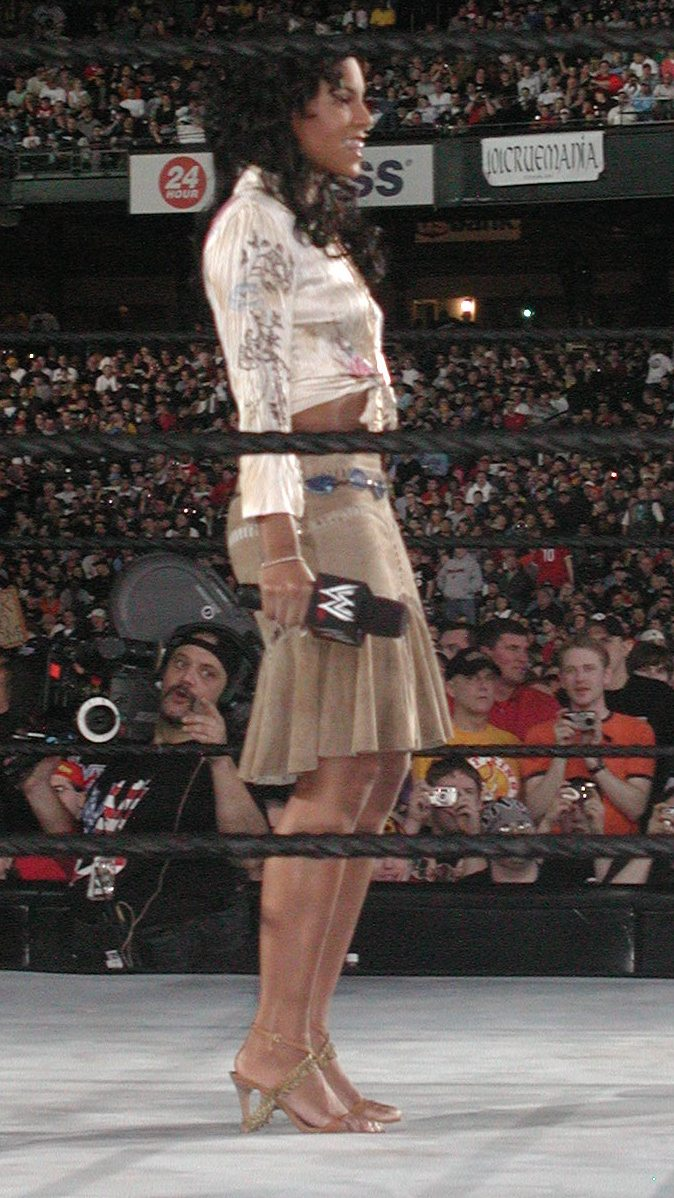
Ashanti performing "America the Beautiful" at the event

The secondary feud on the SmackDown! brand was between Hulk Hogan and Mr. McMahon. One month prior at No Way Out, during a match between Hogan and The Rock, McMahon came down to the ring, only to distract Hogan, which allowed the referee, Sylvan Grenier, to give The Rock a chair, which The Rock used to hit Hogan and pin him for the win. After No Way Out, McMahon proclaimed that Hulkamania was dead and proclaiming a new 'mania; "McMahonamania". On the March 6 episode of SmackDown!, Hogan informed McMahon that Hulkamania was not dead and that McMahon had nothing to do with creating it. McMahon informed Hogan that he did not hate the Hulkamaniacs or Hulkamania, but that he hated Hogan. McMahon then told Hogan that he hated him for leaving WWE (then known as the WWF) and signing with Ted Turner's World Championship Wrestling (WCW), and for testifying against him in the infamous steroid trial in the 1990s. McMahon proceeded to challenge Hogan to a Street Fight at WrestleMania where, if Hogan lost, he would have to retire from professional wrestling. Hogan accepted his challenge later that night. Two weeks later on the March 20 episode of SmackDown!, McMahon and Hogan had a contract signing for their match at WrestleMania. As Hogan was preparing to sign the contract, McMahon attacked Hogan with a steel chair from behind. Shortly afterward, McMahon hit Hogan several times with the chair in the head, causing him to bleed. McMahon then signed the contract and forced Hogan to sign with his own blood.

Another feud on the Raw brand was between Triple H and Booker T, with the two feuding over the World Heavyweight Championship. Triple H won the title three months prior at Armageddon by defeating then-champion Shawn Michaels in a Three Stages of Hell match. In the months following, Triple H wrestled Scott Steiner during the following two pay-per-view events for the World Heavyweight Championship. First was at the Royal Rumble, where Triple H got himself disqualified in order to retain the title when he nailed Steiner with the sledgehammer. Then at No Way Out, he defeated Steiner by pinfall to retain the title. On the February 24 episode of Raw, Booker T won a 20-man battle royal by last eliminating The Rock to become the number one contender to the World Heavyweight Championship at WrestleMania. On the March 3 episode of Raw, Triple H cut a somewhat controversial promo on Booker T. Triple H downplayed Booker T's WCW success, pointing out that the WCW World Heavyweight Championship had been held by non-wrestlers like Vince Russo and actor David Arquette, calling WCW and its title "a joke". He then implied that Booker T, as a convicted criminal, would never win a world championship in WWE, telling Booker T that "people like him" could never be World Heavyweight Champion. In the WrestleMania XIX press conference, Michael Cole questioned Triple H as to whether or not his promo was racially insensitive. Triple H confirmed this was not the case and was indeed only referring to Booker T's criminal past and nothing more. On the March 10 episode of Raw, Booker T got revenge by attacking Triple H in the bathroom, laying him out. On the March 24 episode of Raw, Booker T and Goldust defeated Triple H and Ric Flair in a tag team match with Booker T pinning Triple H.

Another feud from the Raw brand was the rivalry over the Women's Championship. The champion Victoria had captured the title from Trish Stratus at Survivor Series. The next month at Armageddon, Victoria defeated Stratus and Jacqueline in a triple threat match to retain the Women's Championship. Stratus and the returning Jazz had a match on Raw to determine who would challenge Victoria for the title at WrestleMania. During the match, Victoria entered the ring and hit both women with the title belt, earning a double disqualification. It was then announced that Victoria would defend the title against both Stratus and Jazz in a triple threat match at the event.

Yet another feud from the Raw brand was between Chris Jericho and Shawn Michaels. After Michaels lost the World Heavyweight Championship to Triple H at Armageddon, he appeared in an in-ring segment with Jericho, during which Jericho stated that Michaels was washed up. After mocking Michaels and threatening to attack him, Jericho turned around into a superkick. When Michaels was a guest on Jericho's in-ring show The Highlight Reel the following month, Jericho claimed he had idolized Michaels from a young age and that he had been Jericho's inspiration to become a wrestler, even going so far as to emulate Michaels in his early professional years. Jericho then stated that he doesn't need to look up to Shawn Michaels anymore, and that he has far surpassed Michaels in terms of success. At the Royal Rumble, Michaels and Jericho entered the Royal Rumble match at #1 and #2, respectively. Jericho eliminated Michaels from the Royal Rumble match, after a sneak attack from behind. Michaels returned later in the match and attacked Jericho out of revenge, helping to lead to his elimination. The two agreed to meet at WrestleMania XIX in a match.

== Event ==
Other on-screen personnel
Role:	Name:
English commentators	Michael Cole (SmackDown!)
English commentators	Tazz (SmackDown!)
English commentators	Jim Ross (Raw)
English commentators	Jerry Lawler (Raw)
Spanish commentators	Carlos Cabrera
Spanish commentators	Hugo Savinovich
Interviewers	Jonathan Coachman
Interviewers	Josh Mathews
Ring announcers	Howard Finkel (Raw)
Ring announcers	Tony Chimel (SmackDown!)
Referees	Charles Robinson (Raw)
Referees	Nick Patrick (Raw)
Referees	Jack Doan (Raw)
Referees	Earl Hebner (Raw)
Referees	Chad Patton (Raw)
Referees	Mike Chioda (SmackDown!)
Referees	Jim Korderas (SmackDown!)
Referees	Brian Hebner (SmackDown!)
Referees	Mike Sparks (SmackDown!)

=== Sunday Night Heat ===
Before the event aired live on pay-per-view, Kane and Rob Van Dam faced Chief Morley and Lance Storm (with The Dudley Boyz, (Bubba Ray Dudley and D-Von Dudley)) for the World Tag Team Championship on Sunday Night Heat. At the end, while the referee was distracted, the Dudleyz performed the 3D (Dudley Death Drop) on Storm. After which, Bubba dropped an elbow on Van Dam, allowing Storm to pin Van Dam, thus Storm and Morley retained the titles.

=== Preliminary matches ===
An attendance record-setting 54,097 fans at Safeco Field for WrestleMania XIX

As the event began, Ashanti sang a rendition of "America the Beautiful", which has since been omitted from DVD and streaming releases.

In the first match that aired, Rey Mysterio faced Matt Hardy for the WWE Cruiserweight Championship. The match began with back and forth action between the two, until Hardy performed a Twist of Fate for a near-fall. Mysterio retaliated by delivering a 619 on Hardy. But as Mysterio delivered a West Coast Pop, Hardy ducked into a roll-up that saw Hardy use the ring ropes for leverage and successfully pin Mysterio, thus Hardy retained the Cruiserweight Championship.

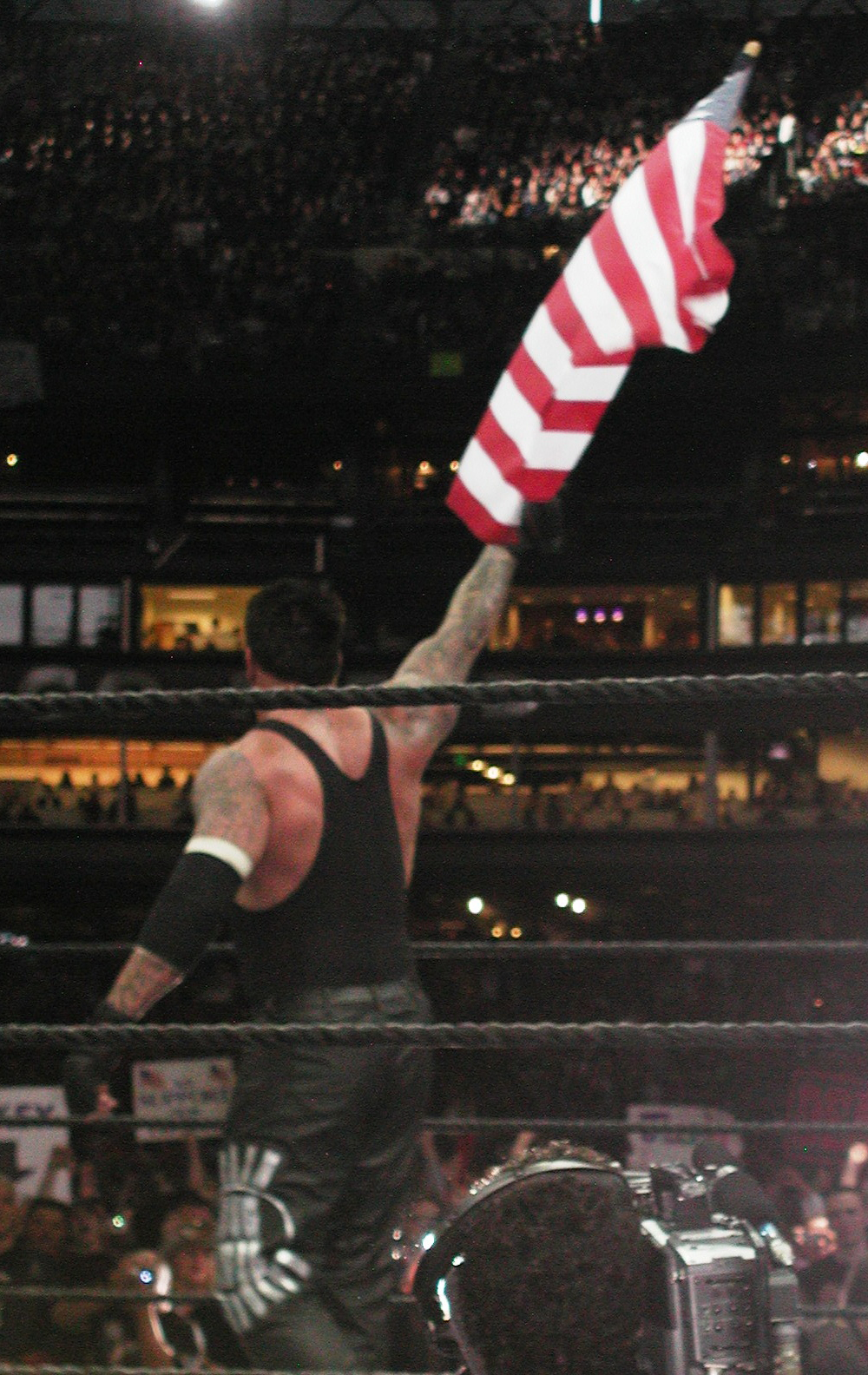
The Undertaker after his match.

In the next match, The Undertaker and Nathan Jones faced Big Show and A-Train in a tag team match. Earlier in the night on Sunday Night Heat, Jones was attacked and beaten down by the FBI. It was then announced that The Undertaker would have to face both Big Show and A-Train in a handicap match. Both Big Show and A-Train had the advantage over The Undertaker at the start of the match; however, late into the match, Jones appeared and attacked Big Show, allowing The Undertaker to deliver a Tombstone Piledriver on A-Train for a successful pinfall, thus The Undertaker won the match and remained undefeated at WrestleMania.

In the third match, Victoria, Jazz and Trish Stratus fought in a triple threat match for the WWE Women's Championship. Throughout the match, Jazz and Victoria would double-team Stratus and Steven Richards, who was at ringside in Victoria's corner, would frequently intervene in the match. As Jazz was thrown over the top rope onto ringside, however, Richards came in the ring with a steel chair and tried to hit Stratus with it, but missed, causing the chair to bounce off the ropes into his face, allowing Stratus to perform the Stratusfaction on him. Victoria went for the Widow's Peak on Stratus, who countered with a Chick Kick to Victoria to win the match and the women's title, tying The Fabulous Moolah's record of four title reigns.

The next match was a triple threat WWE Tag Team Championship match between the teams of Rhyno and Chris Benoit, Los Guerreros (Chavo and Eddie Guerrero), and the champions, Team Angle (Shelton Benjamin and Charlie Haas). Rhyno delivered a Gore on Chavo, but Benjamin tagged himself into the match and pinned Chavo, to win the match and retain the Tag Team Championship.

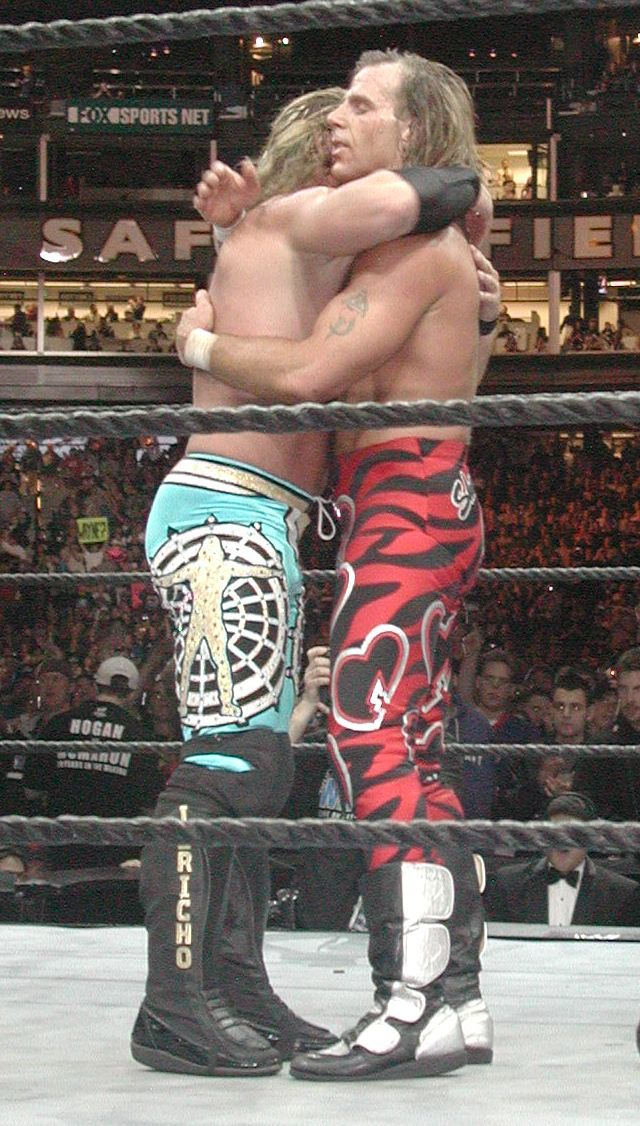
Chris Jericho and Shawn Michaels after their match

In the fifth match, Chris Jericho faced Shawn Michaels. Jericho had the advantage over Michaels at the start of the match, as he applied the Walls of Jericho onto Michaels early on. Later in the match, Jericho hit Michaels with a Sweet Chin Music for a near fall. As Michaels attempted Sweet Chin Music once again, Jericho countered into the Walls of Jericho. After Michaels escaped the hold, he hit Jericho with another Sweet Chin Music for a near fall. Later, Jericho attempted a suplex that Michaels countered into a roll-up giving him the successful pinfall victory. After the match, Jericho offered to shake Michaels's hand and they hugged before Jericho attacked Michaels with a low blow.

Before the next match begun, a fatal four-way pillow fight (hosted by Jonathan Coachman) took place between Stacy Keibler, Torrie Wilson, Tanya Ballinger, and Kitana Baker. The match went to a no contest when all four women teamed up, pulling down Coachman's pants and pinning him.

=== Main event matches ===
The next match was a World Heavyweight Championship match between Booker T and Triple H. The match began with Booker T in control of Triple H, however, Ric Flair, who was at ringside in Triple H's corner, threw Booker T's knee into the steel steps. The attack allowed Triple H to work over Booker T's leg, as he applied various submission holds onto Booker T's leg, including the Indian deathlock. Booker T retaliated and took control of the match; after he delivered a Harlem Hangover leg drop, Booker T grasped his knee in pain, which allowed Triple H to recover and perform a Pedigree to win the match and retain the World Heavyweight Championship.

The seventh match was a street fight between Hulk Hogan and the WWE Chairman, Mr. McMahon. Both Hogan and McMahon tested each other's strength in the beginning of the match, until McMahon threw Hogan out to ringside. Hogan then countered a chairshot by McMahon into several of his own, that caused McMahon to bleed profusely from the head. Late into the match, Roddy Piper made a shocking appearance as he interfered in the match and hit Hogan with a pipe. Hogan however, recovered and delivered a big boot and three running leg drops to McMahon to successfully pin him and win the match.

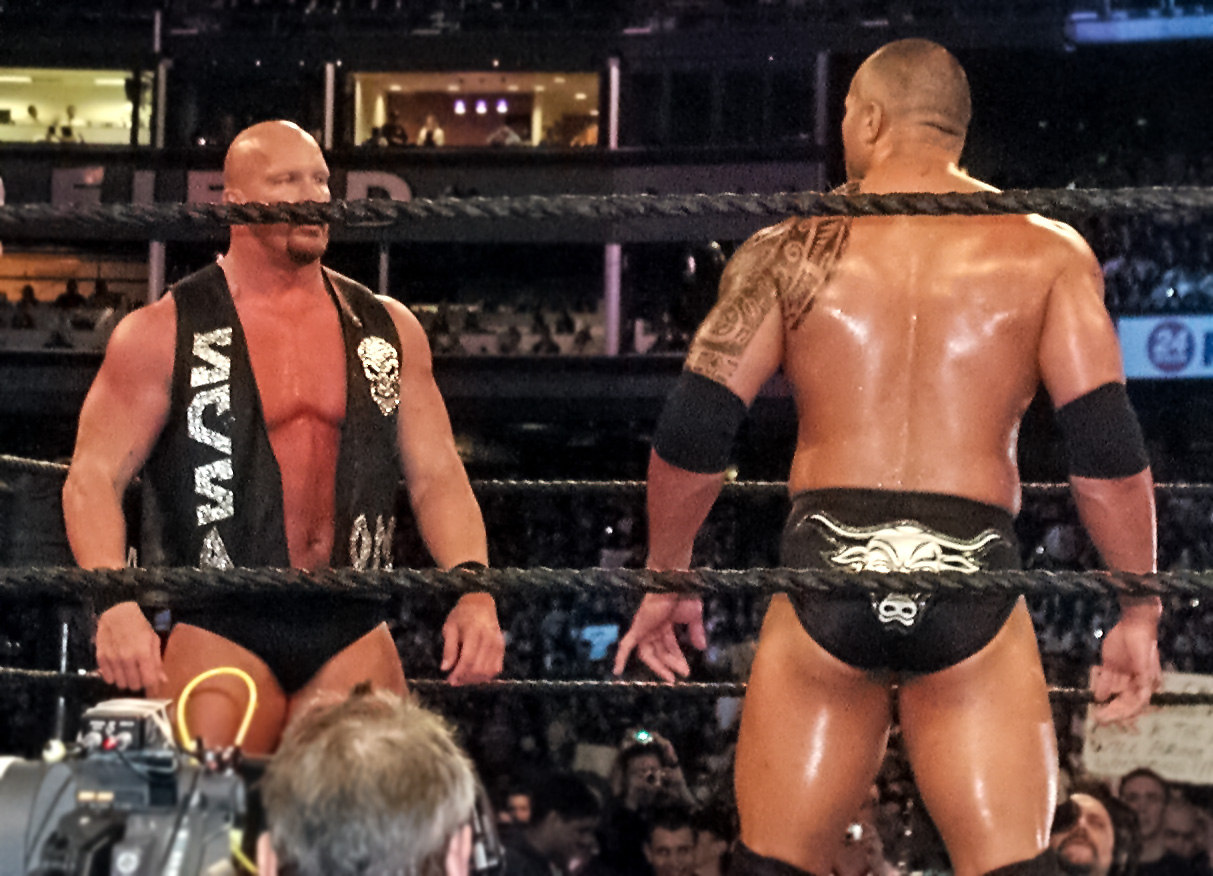
"Stone Cold" Steve Austin faced The Rock—their third WrestleMania encounter—in what would be Austin's final match for 19 years.

The next and final match on the undercard, was the encounter of The Rock and "Stone Cold" Steve Austin. The match began with Austin and The Rock brawling in the ring, which ended up at ringside. Throughout the match, The Rock worked over Austin's leg, which included applying a Sharpshooter on Austin. The Rock then began to constantly taunt Austin, as he put on his vest and imitated his taunts and mannerisms, which led both to use their finishers with unsuccessful pin attempts. Austin performed the Stone Cold Stunner on The Rock for a near-fall, much to Austin's dismay. After he failed to win with the People's Elbow, The Rock then performed two Rock Bottoms on Austin for two near-falls. The Rock performed a third Rock Bottom on Austin, winning the match. After the match in the ring, Rock privately thanked Austin for helping him in his career. This was Austin's last match until WrestleMania 38 in 2022. Many consider this match as the epilogue to the Attitude Era as not only Austin, but The Rock would become a part time performer after his loss the following month to Goldberg at Backlash.

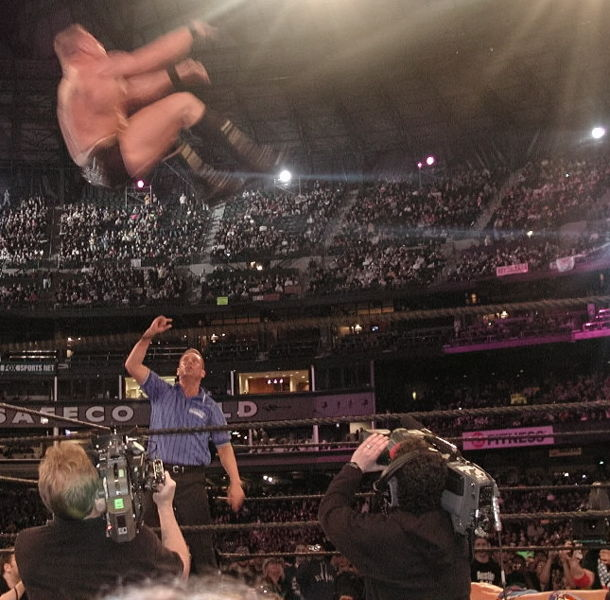
Brock Lesnar attempting a shooting star press on Kurt Angle.

In the main event, Brock Lesnar faced Kurt Angle for the WWE Championship, where if Angle was disqualified or counted out or if anyone interferes on his behalf, he would lose the title. The match began with Lesnar and Angle chain-wrestling back and forth, until Angle countered a shoulder block into a German suplex. Lesnar would then attempt an F-5 on Angle, but Angle countered it into an Ankle Lock that Lesnar was able to escape out of. As Lesnar escaped, Angle would hit an Angle Slam for a near fall. As he attempted another Angle Slam, however, Lesnar countered into an F-5 for a near-fall. Lesnar performed another F-5, and instead of covering Angle, Lesnar climbed to the top rope and massively botched a Shooting Star Press on Angle, which Angle covered for by pinning Lesnar for a near-fall. After Lesnar kicked out, Angle picked up Lesnar only to be hit with a third F-5. Lesnar then successfully pinned Angle, winning the match and the WWE Championship. After the match, Angle and Lesnar shook hands and embraced as the show came to a close.

== Reception ==
The event received highly positive reviews from various websites and wrestling publications. John Powell of Canadian Online Explorer's professional wrestling section rated the event a perfect score of 10 out of 10 stars, which was a higher rating than the previous year's event. The main event between Brock Lesnar and Kurt Angle for the WWE Championship was rated the highest with a score of 9 out of 10 stars, the match between The Rock and "Stone Cold" Steve Austin was rated 8 out of 10 stars, the match between Booker T and Triple H for the World Heavyweight Championship was rated 7.5 out of 10 stars (although the finish was generally frowned upon), the match between Shawn Michaels and Chris Jericho was also rated 7.5 out of 10 stars and the Street Fight between Vince McMahon and Hulk Hogan receiving the lowest rating of 4 out of 10 stars. He also noted that "it was the WWE slugging homeruns last night at WrestleMania XIX. Criticized for not making the most of the talent it has, the WWE had all the bases covered and proved that if the entire organization puts forth the effort, they can deliver a superior sports entertainment product" and further claimed that "WrestleMania XIX was not only a outstanding show but it will surely go down as one of the best WrestleManias ever". In 2019, Troy L. Smith of cleveland.com released a list of the "50 Greatest Wrestling Pay-Per-Views of All Time" from every professional wrestling promotion in the world, with WrestleMania XIX ranked at number eight.

Most of the critics rated Jericho vs. Michaels as the match of the night. Kazuchika Okada stated that he "learned so much from that match." Jericho reported that Michaels viewed it as the best match of the night and a "five-star match". Jericho himself called it "one of the best matches in Mania history."

== Aftermath ==
=== Raw ===
On the Raw after WrestleMania, "Stone Cold" Steve Austin was fired from WWE in storyline by Raw General Manager Eric Bischoff due to "medical reasons". Austin was later re-hired a few weeks later by WWE CEO, Linda McMahon, however, as Raw's Co-General Manager, along with Bischoff. Later that night, The Rock hosted "Rock Appreciation Night", where he taunted Austin for getting fired and proclaimed he was leaving WWE, as he had nothing left to accomplish, and because the fans did not appreciate him anymore. Goldberg would officially make his WWE debut by interrupting The Rock, telling him "You're next!", which led to Goldberg spearing The Rock. On the April 14 episode of Raw, The Rock would accept the challenge made by Goldberg, which he had previously rejected a week earlier, meaning the two would wrestle each other at Backlash. At Backlash, Goldberg successfully pinned The Rock. After the match, once the show was off the air, The Rock gave a farewell speech in which he stated that he was officially taking a sabbatical from professional wrestling.

=== SmackDown ===
On the SmackDown! after WrestleMania, SmackDown! General Manager Stephanie McMahon announced that Kurt Angle suffered a pulled hamstring and a neck injury, while Lesnar suffered multiple concussions. She later announced that a tournament would take place to determine the number one contender to Lesnar's WWE Championship at Backlash. On the April 17 episode of SmackDown!, John Cena would become the number one contender after he defeated Chris Benoit in the tournament's final match. At Backlash, Lesnar defeated Cena to retain the WWE Championship. Lesnar would then feud with Big Show, as he defeated him at Judgment Day to retain the WWE Championship in a stretcher match. Lesnar would, however, lose the WWE Championship to a returning Angle (as a face) at Vengeance in a triple threat match that also involved Big Show. Lesnar (as a heel) then regained the WWE Championship from Angle on the September 18 episode of SmackDown!, in an Iron Man match winning the match 5 falls to 4.

On the April 3 episode of SmackDown!, enraged by his loss at WrestleMania, Mr. McMahon indefinitely suspended Hulk Hogan with pay and forced him to sit out the remainder of his WWE contract as a part of their storyline. On the May 1 episode of SmackDown!, "Mr. America" (Hogan under a mask) made his debut on Piper's Pit, where McMahon promised to prove Mr. America was actually Hogan. Also involved in the feud was Zach Gowen, a one legged wrestler who was brought into the feud by Mr. America. After multiple failed attempts to prove Mr. America was Hogan, however, McMahon finally succeeded on the July 3 episode of SmackDown!, after he aired footage of Mr. America unmasking after the televised broadcast and revealing himself to be Hogan. He then announced that Hogan was fired from WWE.

== Results ==
No.	Results	Stipulations	Times
1^{H}	Chief Morley and Lance Storm (c) (with The Dudley Boyz) defeated Kane and Rob Van Dam by pinfall	Tag team match for the World Tag Team Championship	7:02
2	Matt Hardy (c) (with Shannon Moore) defeated Rey Mysterio by pinfall	Singles match for the WWE Cruiserweight Championship	5:37
3	The Undertaker defeated Big Show and A-Train by pinfall	Handicap match	9:42
4	Trish Stratus defeated Victoria (c) (with Steven Richards) and Jazz by pinfall	Triple threat match for the WWE Women's Championship	7:17
5	Team Angle (Shelton Benjamin and Charlie Haas) (c) defeated Rhyno and Chris Benoit and Los Guerreros (Eddie and Chavo) by pinfall	Triple threat tag team match for the WWE Tag Team Championship	8:48
6	Shawn Michaels defeated Chris Jericho by pinfall	Singles match	22:35
7	Triple H (c) (with Ric Flair) defeated Booker T by pinfall	Singles match for the World Heavyweight Championship	18:45
8	Hulk Hogan defeated Mr. McMahon by pinfall	Street Fight; Had Hogan lost, he would have had to retire from in-ring competition.	20:47
9	The Rock defeated "Stone Cold" Steve Austin by pinfall	Singles match	17:55
10	Brock Lesnar defeated Kurt Angle (c) by pinfall	Singles match for the WWE Championship; Had Angle been counted out, disqualified, or had anyone interfered on his behalf, he would have also lost the title.	21:08
(c) / – the champion(s) heading into the match; H / – the match was broadcast prior to the pay-per-view on Sunday Night Heat
