= The Lonely Position of Neutral =

2002 studio album by Trust Company

Studio album by Trust Company
- Released: July 22, 2002; July 23, 2002 (US)
- Recorded: December 2001–January 2002
- Studios: NRG Recording Studios, North Hollywood
- Genres: Nu metal; alternative metal
- Length: 40:24
- Labels: DCide; Geffen
- Producers: Danny Lohner; Don Gilmore

Trust Company chronology
The Lonely Position of Neutral (2002)	True Parallels (2005)

Singles from The Lonely Position of Neutral
- 1. "Downfall" Released: 2002; 2. "Running from Me" Released: 2002; 3. "The Fear" Released: 2003

The Lonely Position of Neutral is the debut album by American rock band Trust Company. It was released on July 22, 2002 internationally and on July 23, 2002, in the United States; a version including two bonus tracks was released on February 19, 2003. The Lonely Position of Neutral is Trust Company's most successful album to date and was certified gold for sales in excess of 500,000 copies. The track "Drop to Zero" was also known as "The Lonely Position of Neutral" back when the band was known as 41Down, and was later remade for this album.

The album's lead single, "Downfall," was released in 2002. It gained the band its breakthrough popularity for both its infectious melody and unusual music video. The track reached number six on both the Mainstream Rock Tracks and Modern Rock Tracks charts, and earned a spot at number 91 on the Billboard Hot 100 pop chart. The video features front-man Kevin Palmer walking down a street, with everything behind him blown away by wind. It found significant airplay on MTV2. "Running from Me" was the second single from the album and released in the same year. Its video features the band wearing strange masks and unveiling them in the pouring rain. The third single, "The Fear", was released in 2003.

== Critical reception ==
Professional ratings
Aggregate scores
Source	Rating
Metacritic	(59/100)
Review scores
Source	Rating
411mania.com	(7/10)
AllMusic	3/5 stars
Blender	3/5 stars
E! Online	C
Rolling Stone	3/5 stars
Spin	(5/10)

Jason D. Taylor of AllMusic commended the band for sticking with the nu-metal formula to create tracks that are recognizable and contain elements of pop punk but was unsure of their career long-term when compared to similar acts like Linkin Park, concluding that "This is a shame, because those willing to give this album a chance will find one of the most infectious alternative metal albums of 2002." Rolling Stone's Barry Walters was adamant of the instrumentation throughout the album, saying that it follows "modern-rock-radio conventions" but said that "the singing's understatement and harmonic sophistication help the band transcend overblown corporate rock and embrace sensitive emo pop."

== Track listing ==
All tracks are written by Kevin Palmer, James Fukai, Josh Moates, and Jason Singleton.

No.	Title	Length
1.	"Downfall"	3:11
2.	"Falling Apart"	3:28
3.	"Hover"	3:38
4.	"Running from Me"	3:08
5.	"Slipping Away"	3:05
6.	"Figure 8"	3:55
7.	"The Fear"	3:19
8.	"Deeper into You"	3:14
9.	"Drop to Zero"	3:26
10.	"Finally"	4:10
11.	"Take It All"	3:13
Total length:		37:47

EnhancedCD Bonus Content
No.	Title	Length
12.	"Hover (Quiet Mix)"	3:21

Japanese bonus track
No.	Title	Length
12.	"Today"	3:39

UK special edition bonus track
No.	Title	Length
12.	"Closer"	4:05

== Personnel ==
Credits for The Lonely Position of Neutral adapted from the liner notes.

Trust Company

- Kevin Palmer – lead vocals, rhythm guitar
- James Fukai – lead guitar, backing vocals
- Josh Moates – bass guitar, backing vocals
- Jason Singleton – drums, backing vocals

Artwork

- Jason Harter, Trust Company – art direction
- Miriam Santos Kayda – photography

Additional musicians

- Don Gilmore – co-writing on "Falling Apart" and "Hover"
- Paz Lenchantin - piano & strings on "Hover"

Production

- Danny Lohner – producer
- Don Gilmore – producer, engineer
- Les Scurry – production coordinator
- John Ewing Jr. – engineer
- Joey Paradise – assistant engineer
- Jordan Schur – executive producer
- Vlado Meller – mastering at Sony Music Studios, NYC
- Andy Wallace – mixing at Soundtrack Studios, NYC

== Charts ==
Album

Chart (2002)	Peak position
US Billboard 200	11

Singles

Year	Single	Chart	Position
2002	"Downfall"	US Mainstream Rock Tracks	6
2002	"Downfall"	US Modern Rock Tracks	6
2002	"Downfall"	US Billboard Hot 100	91
2002	"Downfall"	UK Singles Chart	89
2002	"Running from Me"	US Mainstream Rock Tracks	24
2002	"Running from Me"	US Modern Rock Tracks	22

=== Certifications ===
Country	Certification	Sales
United States	Gold	500,000+

== Appearances in media ==
- "Downfall" was used as the theme for the WWE pay-per-view Vengeance (2002) and later appeared in the Mercy Reef pilot teaser. It was also featured the video games BMX XXX in 2002, Disney's Extreme Skate Adventure in 2003, and MX Unleashed in 2004; it was later made as a downloadable song in the music rhythm game Rock Band on March 2, 2010.
- "Falling Apart" was used for the WWE pay-per-view Royal Rumble (2003).
- "Take it All" was featured in the Xbox exclusive game Breakdown by Namco in 2004. It is played during the ending credits, and is also included in the game's promotional video that is unlocked once the game is finished.
