= No Way Out (2003) =

World Wrestling Entertainment pay-per-view event

- Promotional poster featuring Scott Steiner
- Promotion: World Wrestling Entertainment
- Brand(s): Raw; SmackDown!
- Date: February 23, 2003
- City: Montreal, Quebec, Canada
- Venue: Bell Centre
- Attendance: 15,100
- Buy rate: 450,000

Pay-per-view chronology
← Previous; Royal Rumble	Next → WrestleMania XIX

No Way Out chronology
← Previous; 2002	Next → 2004

WWE in Canada chronology
← Previous; WrestleMania X8	Next → Backlash 2004

The 2003 No Way Out was a professional wrestling pay-per-view (PPV) event produced by the American promotion World Wrestling Entertainment (WWE). It was the fifth No Way Out and took place on February 23, 2003, at the Bell Centre in Montreal, Quebec, Canada, held for wrestlers from the promotion's Raw and SmackDown! brand divisions.

This was the first No Way Out held under the first brand extension that began in March 2002, and it was the last to feature multiple brands until 2008, as beginning with Bad Blood in June, all monthly PPVs outside of the "Big Four" (WrestleMania, SummerSlam, Survivor Series, and Royal Rumble) became brand-exclusive until brand-exclusive PPVs were discontinued after WrestleMania 23 in April 2007. This was also the first No Way Out produced under the WWE name, after the promotion was renamed from World Wrestling Federation (WWF) to WWE in May 2002. This was also the first WWE pay-per-view event held in Montreal since the infamous Montreal Screwjob at Survivor Series in 1997.

The main event from the SmackDown! brand was a rematch from WrestleMania X8 between Hulk Hogan and The Rock, which The Rock won by pinfall after Sylvain Grenier, the referee of the match, allowed Rock to hit Hogan with a steel chair, which proceeded to a Rock Bottom. The main event from the Raw brand was a World Heavyweight Championship match between Triple H and Scott Steiner, which Triple H won via pinfall, after he hit Steiner with the championship belt and a Pedigree. The primary match on the undercard from Raw was the encounter of "Stone Cold" Steve Austin and Eric Bischoff, which Austin won via pinfall after three consecutive Stone Cold Stunners. The main match on the undercard from SmackDown! was a Handicap match between Team Angle (Kurt Angle, Charlie Haas, and Shelton Benjamin) and the team of Brock Lesnar and Chris Benoit, where Edge (Lesnar and Benoit's partner) was unable to participate in the match due to injury. The match, however, was won by Lesnar and Benoit via submission, after Benoit forced Haas to submit to the Crippler Crossface.

== Production ==
=== Background ===
No Way Out was a professional wrestling pay-per-view (PPV) event first held by the American promotion World Wrestling Entertainment (WWE) as the 20th In Your House PPV in February 1998. Following the discontinuation of the In Your House series in February 1999, No Way Out was reinstated in February 2000 as its own PPV event, thus establishing it as the annual February PPV for the promotion. The fifth event was held on February 23, 2003, at the Bell Centre in Montreal, Quebec, Canada. This was the first WWE pay-per-view event in Montreal since the infamous Montreal Screwjob at the 1997 Survivor Series.

This was the first No Way Out held under the WWE name, as the promotion was renamed from World Wrestling Federation (WWF) to WWE in May 2002. It was also the first No Way Out held during the brand extension that was introduced in March 2002, a storyline subdivision in which the promotion divided its roster into two separate brands, Raw and SmackDown!, where wrestlers were exclusively assigned to perform. The 2003 event in turn featured wrestlers from both brands.

=== Storylines ===
On the January 23 episode of SmackDown!, SmackDown! General Manager Stephanie McMahon announced the return of Hulk Hogan to WWE. During the returning segment of Hogan, the WWE Chairman, Vince McMahon, came down to the ring to insult Hogan, resulting in Hogan challenging McMahon into a match. However, Hogan then proceeded to attack McMahon. The attack led to McMahon accepting Hogan's challenge. On the January 30 episode of SmackDown! however, McMahon instead booked a rematch from WrestleMania X8 between Hogan and his representative, The Rock at No Way Out; thus reigniting the feud between The Rock and Hogan. During the weeks leading to No Way Out, both The Rock and Hogan cut promos on who was the better wrestler. The feud intensified on the February 20 episode of SmackDown! where The Rock made his first live appearance on WWE television in 6 months. The Rock acted genuine as if he was attempting to shake Hogan's hand, but then spat water into Hogan's face.

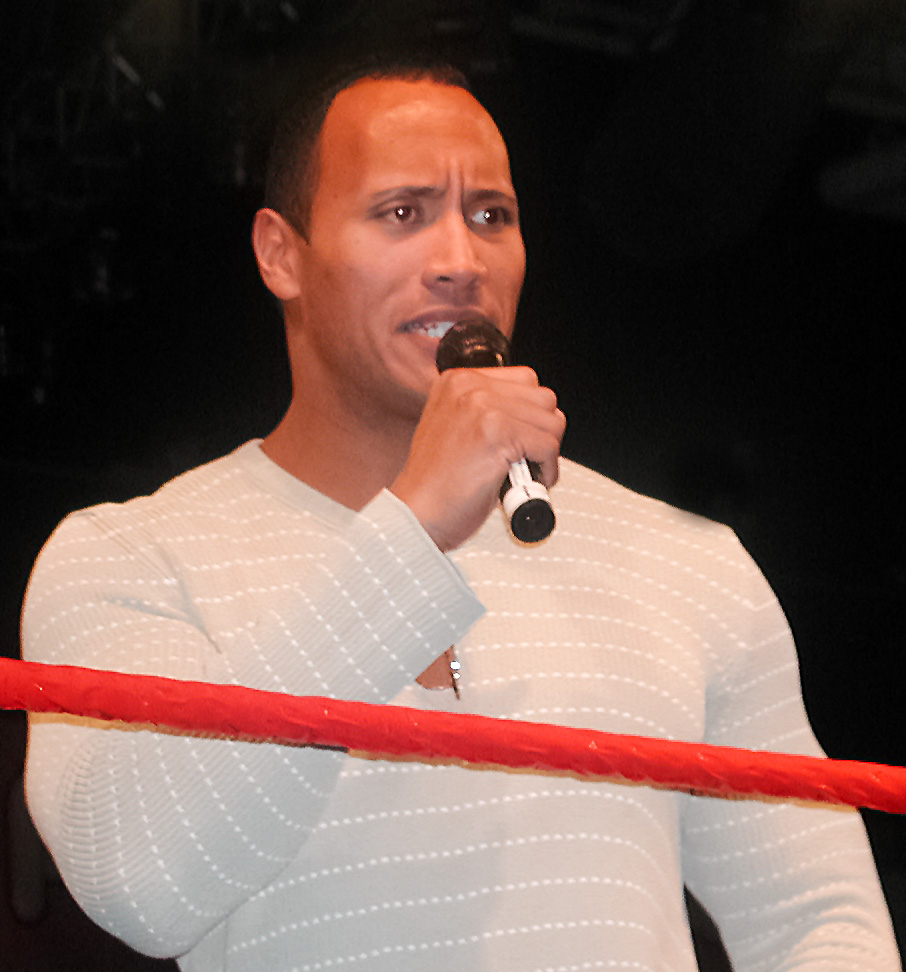
The Rock, who feuded with Hulk Hogan

At the Royal Rumble, Kurt Angle successfully defended the WWE Championship against Chris Benoit, while Brock Lesnar won the Royal Rumble match later in the night to earn himself a WWE Championship match at WrestleMania XIX. On the January 23 episode of SmackDown!, Kurt Angle confronted his protégés, Team Angle (Charlie Haas and Shelton Benjamin), about their losses that night, as Benjamin was pinned by Edge, while Haas was pinned by Benoit. On the January 30 episode of SmackDown!, Haas and Benjamin were booked in a tag team match against Edge and Benoit. During the match, Angle interfered in Haas and Benjamin's behalf, which allowed them to pin Edge and Benoit for the win. Haas and Benjamin would then defeat the then-reigning WWE Tag Team Champions, Los Guerreros, to win the WWE Tag Team Championship on the February 6 episode of SmackDown!. On the February 13 episode of SmackDown!, General Manager Stephanie McMahon announced a match between Team Angle (Angle, Haas, and Benjamin) against the team of Lesnar, Benoit, and Edge at No Way Out, thus the official beginning of the Team Angle-Team Lesnar feud. On the February 20 episode of SmackDown!, Angle was booked in a match against Lesnar, however, before the match started, Angle stated that Lesnar had to defeat Haas and Benjamin before he could wrestle Angle, which Lesnar was able to do. As Lesnar then wrestled Angle, Paul Heyman, who was at ringside, interfered in the match and hit Lesnar with a steel chair, causing Angle to lose by disqualification.

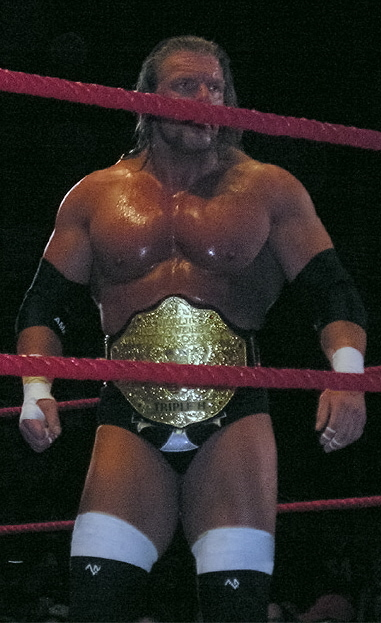
Triple H as Raw's World Heavyweight Champion

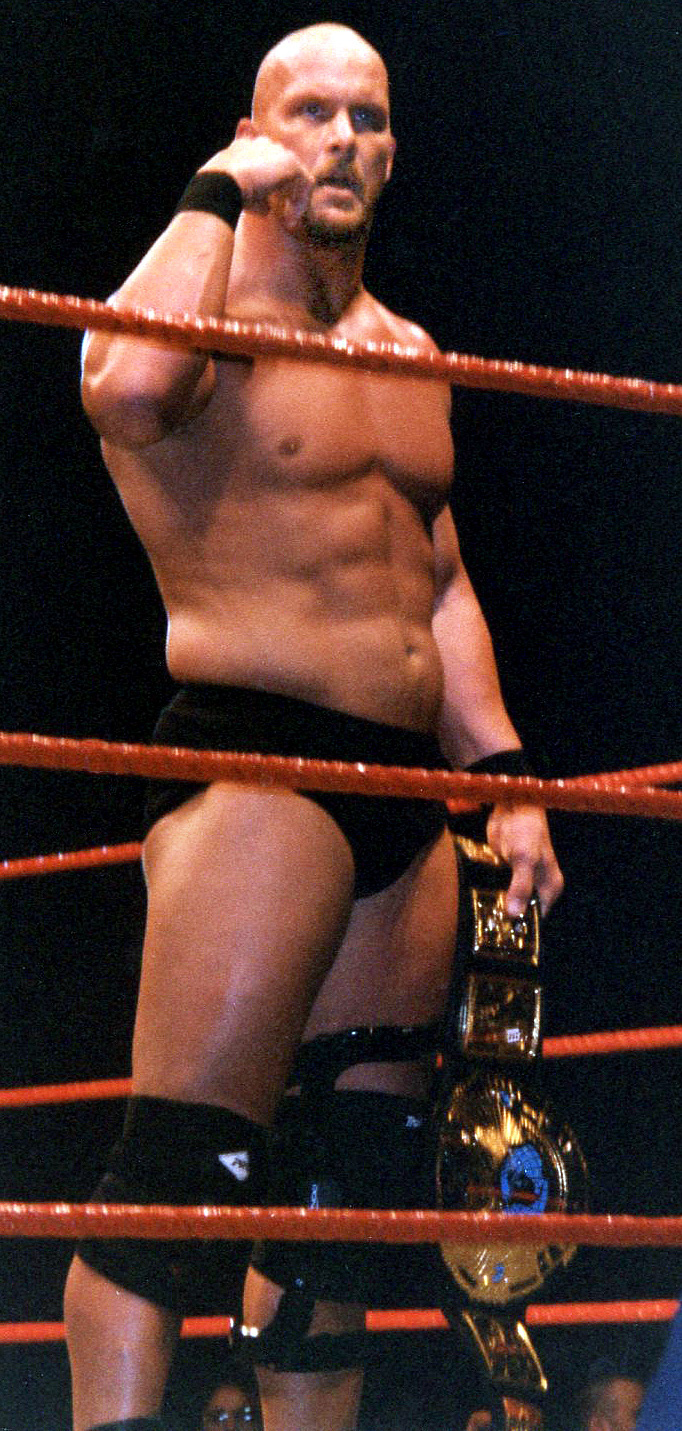
"Stone Cold" Steve Austin returned to WWE at No Way Out

On the January 20 episode of Raw, Eric Bischoff made an announcement about how "Stone Cold" Steve Austin walked out on WWE during the summer of 2002 with no explanation and that he would like to give Austin an opportunity to give his side of the story. Bischoff also invited Austin to make an appearance at No Way Out. On the January 27 episode of Raw, Bischoff stated that Austin has agreed to tell his story in the Raw magazine. On the February 3 episode of Raw, Bischoff headed to Texas, to sign Austin to the Raw brand. But, he was unsuccessful in doing so, as he could not locate Austin anywhere. On the February 10 episode of Raw, Bischoff (kayfabe) fired Jim Ross, after Bischoff stated that it was Ross' fault that Austin had not signed yet to the brand. Vince McMahon had stated the previous week that he would fire Bischoff and Chief Morley due to the way they were running Raw the last couple of weeks, and due to the fact that Bischoff had not yet signed Austin to the Raw brand. That night, McMahon asked Bischoff if he had signed Austin yet, which prompted Bischoff to say "no". Before McMahon could fire Bischoff, however, Ross informed McMahon that Austin would be at No Way Out, which led to McMahon booking a match between Bischoff and Austin at No Way Out.

At the Royal Rumble, a scheduled match for the World Heavyweight Championship saw Triple H defend the title against Scott Steiner. The match saw Steiner defeat Triple H by disqualification, after Triple H brought a sledgehammer in during the match. As a result, Triple H retained the World Heavyweight Championship. On the January 20 episode of Raw, Steiner was put in a match against Batista. In the match, Batista was disqualified after interference from Randy Orton. After the match, Triple H, Ric Flair, Orton and Batista all attacked Steiner, which led to Triple H performing a Pedigree on Steiner. On the February 3 episode of Raw, Triple H officially formed the stable known as Evolution with Flair, Orton, and Batista. That same night, a number one contender's match was scheduled between Chris Jericho and Steiner, in which the winner would meet Triple H at No Way Out for the World Heavyweight Championship. The match saw Steiner defeat Jericho.

After his Hell in a Cell match with Brock Lesnar at No Mercy in October, The Undertaker came to the ring and called out Lesnar who apologized for bringing Undertaker's wife Sara into the feud and stated that he earned his respect. After Lesnar departed from the ring, Big Show who had been traded to SmackDown! from Raw came to the ring and stated that it was because of him that Lesnar was able to defeat Undertaker and referred to him as a broken down has-been. Undertaker stated back that he would rather be a broken down has-been than a giant that never was, referring to Big Show. When Undertaker walked up to the stage and posed for the crowd, Big Show emerged from the back and attacked him before gorilla pressing him over head and throwing him off the stage. As a result of the attack, Undertaker was injured and placed out of action for over three months. In January he returned at Royal Rumble and was the last participant eliminated from the Royal Rumble match by Lesnar who won. On the January 23 episode of SmackDown!, Undertaker made his return and called out Big Show but instead Big Show sent out A-Train to face Undertaker in a match which Undertaker won. The following three weeks, saw Big Show through his agent Paul Heyman sending Undertaker boxed gifts to the ring such as Brother Love, Chris Kanyon who was dressed as singer Boy George and finally a puppy in what turned out to be an ambush as Big Show attacked Undertaker from behind and Chokeslammed him. This led to a match between the two at No Way Out.

== Event ==
Other on-screen personnel
Role:	Name:
English commentators	Jonathan Coachman (Raw)
English commentators	Jerry Lawler (Raw)
English commentators	Jim Ross (Raw; Austin/Bischoff match only)
English commentators	Michael Cole (SmackDown)
English commentators	Tazz (SmackDown)
Spanish commentators	Carlos Cabrera
Spanish commentators	Hugo Savinovich
Interviewers	Jonathan Coachman
Interviewers	Josh Mathews
Ring announcers	Howard Finkel (Raw)
Ring announcers	Tony Chimel (SmackDown)
Referee	Charles Robinson (Raw)
Referee	Nick Patrick (Raw)
Referee	Jack Doan (Raw)
Referee	Earl Hebner (Raw)
Referee	Chad Patton (Raw)
Referee	Mike Chioda (SmackDown)
Referee	Jim Korderas (SmackDown)
Referee	Brian Hebner (SmackDown)
Referee	Mike Sparks (SmackDown)
General Managers	Eric Bischoff (Raw)
General Managers	Stephanie McMahon (SmackDown!)

=== Preliminary matches ===
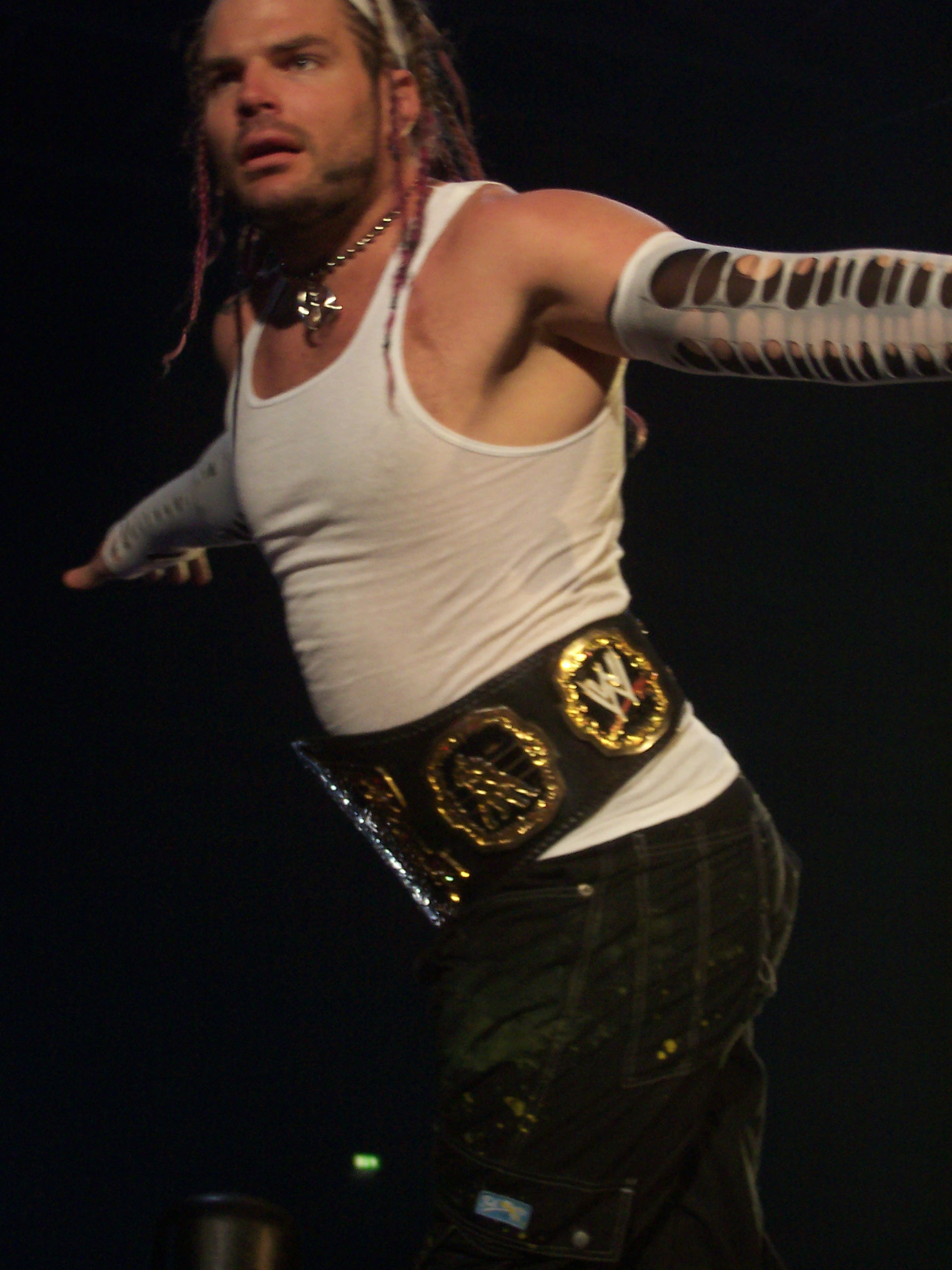
Jeff Hardy lost to Chris Jericho in their match at No Way Out.

Before the event aired live on pay-per-view, Mark Henry defeated John Cena in a dark match and Rey Mysterio defeated Jamie Noble on Sunday Night Heat. The first match was between Jeff Hardy and Chris Jericho. Jericho forced Hardy to submit to the Walls of Jericho to win the match.

Next was a World Tag Team Championship match between Kane and Rob Van Dam and William Regal and Lance Storm. After Storm pulled Kane's mask, preventing him from seeing, Kane executed a Chokeslam on Van Dam. Storm pinned Van Dam to retain the title.

The third match was a Cruiserweight Championship match between Matt Hardy and Billy Kidman. Hardy executed a Twist of Fate off the top rope to win the title.

Next was a match between Big Show and The Undertaker. The Undertaker forced Big Show to pass out to a Triangle Choke to win the match.

=== Main event matches ===
In the fifth match, Team Angle (Kurt Angle, Charlie Haas, and Shelton Benjamin) faced Brock Lesnar and Chris Benoit in a 3-on-2 Handicap Match. Before the match, Edge was attacked backstage and it was announced he was unable to compete, thus make it 3-on-2. Edge had suffered a severe neck injury prior to the event, and was forced to be written off of television for the foreseeable future. Lesnar and Benoit won the match after Benoit forced Haas to submit to the Crippler Crossface.

Next was a World Heavyweight Championship match between Scott Steiner and Triple H. After Evolution (Ric Flair, Randy Orton and Batista) interfered, Steiner attacked them, which caused the referee, Earl Hebner, to eject them. Triple H hit Steiner with the title belt and executed a Pedigree to retain the title.

The final match on the undercard was a match between Eric Bischoff and "Stone Cold" Steve Austin. Before the match began, Bischoff offered Austin a chance to forfeit the match, but Austin attacked him instead. Bischoff attempted to escape by running around ringside only to be attacked once again by Austin. As Austin rolled Bischoff back into the ring, he performed the Stone Cold Stunner on Bischoff. As Austin pinned Bischoff, Austin deliberately broke the pinfall to perform two more Stunners on Bischoff to win the match.

The main event was the WrestleMania X8 rematch between Hulk Hogan and The Rock. The Rock executed a Rock Bottom on Hogan and applied two consecutive People's Elbows. Hogan performed a Big Boot and a Leg drop but as the referee counted the pinfall, the lights in the arena went off. As the lights came back on, the referee, Sylvain Grenier, was unconscious, allowing Vince McMahon to distract Hogan, which allowed the referee to hand a steel chair to The Rock, which he hit Hogan with. The Rock executed a Rock Bottom to win the match.

== Aftermath ==
=== Raw ===
On the February 27 episode of SmackDown!, Vince McMahon announced that The Rock had chosen to be part of the Raw brand, thus making him Raw exclusive and ending the feud between The Rock and Hulk Hogan. On the Raw brand, The Rock immediately began a feud with "Stone Cold" Steve Austin, and on the March 3 episode of Raw, The Rock challenged Austin to a match at WrestleMania XIX. However, Raw General Manager Eric Bischoff announced that if The Rock defeated Booker T the following week on Raw, he would have the choice to either face Austin or have a World Heavyweight Championship match against Triple H at WrestleMania. The following week on Raw, The Rock announced that instead of facing Booker T, he would choose his own opponent, in which he chose The Hurricane. During the match, however, Austin came out to the ring and distracted The Rock, which allowed The Hurricane to roll up The Rock into a pinfall; despite losing the match, The Rock chose Austin as his WrestleMania opponent. At WrestleMania, The Rock defeated Austin via pinfall.

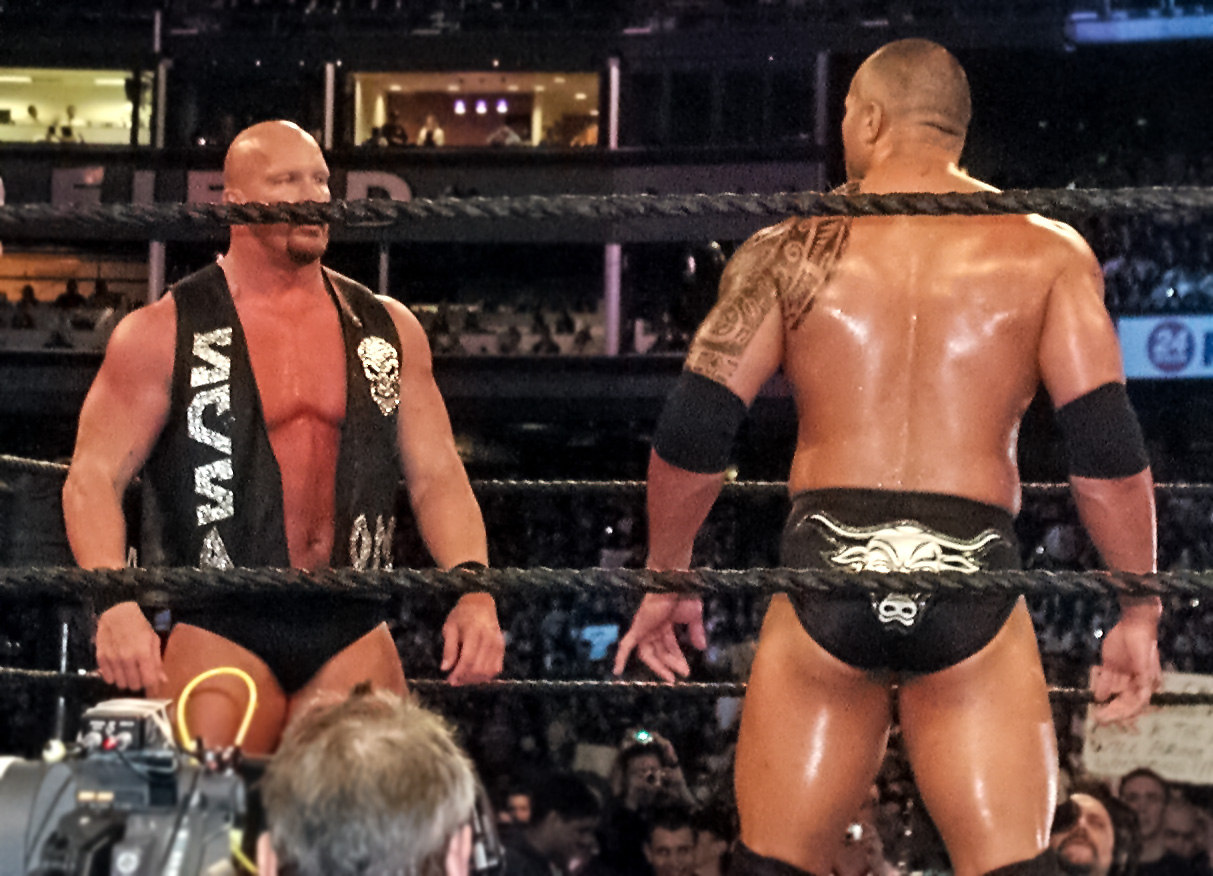
The Rock vs. "Stone Cold" Steve Austin at WrestleMania XIX.

=== SmackDown ===
After No Way Out, Vince McMahon continued his feud with Hulk Hogan, in which he proclaimed that Hulkamania was dead and proclaiming a new mania; McMahonamania. On the March 6 episode of SmackDown!, Hogan informed McMahon that Hulkamania was not dead and that McMahon had nothing to do with creating it. McMahon informed Hogan that he did not hate Hulkamaniacs or Hulkamania, but he hated Hogan; McMahon explained that he hated Hogan, because he left WWE and went to work for Ted Turner's promotion World Championship Wrestling (WCW). McMahon also stated that he hated Hogan for the fact that Hogan testified against him in his steroid trial (even though in reality Hogan testifed that McMahon never told anyone to take steroids). McMahon challenged Hogan to a Street Fight at WrestleMania XIX, to the stipulation that if he beat Hogan, he would never wrestle again and stating he would kill Hulkamania. On the March 20 episode of SmackDown!, the contract signing between McMahon and Hogan's match at WrestleMania took place. During the contract signing, McMahon attacked Hogan from behind with a steel chair. The attack led to McMahon stabbing Hogan with a pen in the forehead and forcing him to sign the contract in Hogan's blood. At WrestleMania, Hogan defeated McMahon after three Leg drops.

=== Future ===
Although the 2003 No Way Out featured wrestlers from both Raw and SmackDown!, as the next three years' events were held exclusively for SmackDown! brand. The next featured wrestlers from both Raw and SmackDown! in 2008 event, also involved ECW wrestlers.

== Reception ==
In 2008, J.D. Dunn of 411Mania gave the event a rating of 5.0 [Not so good], stating "If you cut out the "money" matches, this is a decent show (well, keep Hogan/Rock II). Austin abusing Bischoff, while fun for people who hate Bischoff isn't something that belongs on ppv. The World Title match was just horrible, a worth suck-sessor to their Rumble match. The atmosphere was great, but the actual matches- outside of the handicap tag- didn't live up to ppv status. Thumbs down."

== Results ==
No.	Results	Stipulations	Times
1^{D}	Mark Henry defeated John Cena	Singles match	5:43
2^{H}	Rey Mysterio defeated Jamie Noble (with Nidia)	Singles match	4:35
3	Chris Jericho defeated Jeff Hardy by submission	Singles match	12:59
4	William Regal and Lance Storm (c) defeated Kane and Rob Van Dam	Tag team match for the World Tag Team Championship	9:20
5	Matt Hardy (with Shannon Moore) defeated Billy Kidman (c)	Singles match for the WWE Cruiserweight Championship	9:31
6	The Undertaker defeated Big Show (with Paul Heyman) by technical submission	Singles match	14:08
7	Brock Lesnar and Chris Benoit defeated Team Angle (Kurt Angle, Charlie Haas and Shelton Benjamin) (with Paul Heyman) by submission	Handicap match	13:19
8	Triple H (c) (with Ric Flair) defeated Scott Steiner	Singles match for the World Heavyweight Championship	13:01
9	"Stone Cold" Steve Austin defeated Eric Bischoff	Singles match	4:26
10	The Rock defeated Hulk Hogan	Singles match	12:35
(c) / – the champion(s) heading into the match; D / – this was a dark match; H / – the match was broadcast prior to the pay-per-view on Sunday Night Heat

== See also ==
- Professional wrestling in Canada
