= Downfall (Trust Company song) =

Single by Trust Company

from the album The Lonely Position of Neutral
- Released: 2002
- Recorded: 2001–02
- Genre: Nu metal
- Length: 3:13
- Label: Geffen
- Songwriter: Trust Company
- Producers: Danny Lohner; Trust Company

Trust Company singles chronology
"Downfall" (2002)	"Running from Me" (2002)

Music video
- "Downfall" on YouTube

"Downfall" is a song by American rock band Trust Company. It is the lead single from their 2002 debut album The Lonely Position of Neutral. "Downfall" peaked at No. 6 on both the Billboard Mainstream Rock Tracks and Modern Rock Tracks charts in September 2002. It is one of the band's most well-known songs.

== Style ==
"This song pretty much sums up who we are as far as music, it mixes heavy riffs with softer vocals which can sometimes also get heavy to match the riffs," said an unidentified band member in an email interview in 2002.

== Music video ==
The video features frontman Kevin Palmer walking down a street, leaving everything he walks past being blown by a massive gust of wind. It also features the band playing in a warehouse. The music video found significant airplay on MTV2.

== Media appearances ==
"Downfall" appears in the Mercy Reef pilot teaser. It also appears in the video games BMX XXX, Disney's Extreme Skate Adventure, NFL Blitz Pro and MX Unleashed. "Downfall" was made as a downloadable song in music rhythm game Rock Band on March 2, 2010. "Downfall" was used as the main theme for Vengeance (2002). Meanwhile, its B-side "Falling Apart" was used for the Royal Rumble (2003) pay-per-view.

== Track listing ==
No.	Title	Length
1.	"Downfall (album version)"	3:13
2.	"Falling Apart"	3:30

== Charts ==
Chart performance for "Downfall"
Chart (2002)	Peak position
Scottish Singles Sales (Official Charts)	91
UK Singles (Official Charts)	89
UK Rock & Metal (Official Charts)	6
US Billboard Hot 100	91
US Alternative Airplay (Billboard)	6
US Mainstream Rock (Billboard)	6
