= Dreaming in Black and White =

Studio album by Trust Company
- Released: March 8, 2011
- Recorded: May 2010
- Genre: Nu metal
- Length: 44:18
- Label: Entertainment One
- Producer: Chuck Alkazian

Trust Company chronology
True Parallels (2005)	Dreaming in Black and White (2011)

Singles from Dreaming in Black and White
- 1. "Heart in My Hands" Released: October 5, 2010

Professional ratings
Review scores
Source	Rating
AllMusic	3/5 stars
Cosmos	10/10
Flocked Media	4.6/5
RebelMediaOnline	4/5 stars
Revolver	3/5 stars
Sputnikmusic	3.5/5 stars

Dreaming in Black and White is the third studio album by American rock band Trust Company. It was released on March 8, 2011, by Entertainment One Music.

The album's lead single, "Heart in My Hands", gained significant radio support and the music video was released on December 15, 2010, via the online music video service Vevo. In 2008, Trust Company released two tracks via Myspace entitled "Stumbling" and "Waking Up". These tracks were re-recorded for the final album and have had subtle changes added to them.

== Track listing ==
All lyrics are written by Kevin Palmer; all music is composed by Trust Company.

No.	Title	Length
1.	"Close Your Eyes (Til It's Over)"	3:31
2.	"Heart in My Hands"	3:16
3.	"Almost There"	3:40
4.	"Stumbling"	3:54
5.	"Reverse and Remember"	3:40
6.	"Pulling You Down"	3:39
7.	"Alone Again"	4:09
8.	"Dreaming in Black and White"	3:38
9.	"Letting Go"	3:40
10.	"Skies Will Burn"	3:24
11.	"We Are the Ones"	4:06
12.	"Don't Say Goodbye"	3:41
Total length:		44:18

Bonus tracks
No.	Title	Length
1.	"Stumbling (Acoustic version) [iTunes deluxe edition bonus track]"	3:55
2.	"Waking Up [European edition bonus track]"	2:38

B-sides
No.	Title	Length
13.	"Fail"	4:06
