= True Parallels =

Studio album by Trust Company
- Released: March 21, 2005
- Recorded: 2003–2004
- Studio: NRG Recording Studio, North Hollywood, CA | Bay 7 Studios, Valley Village, CA | Sparky Dark Studio, Calabasas, CA
- Genre: Nu metal; alternative metal; post-grunge
- Length: 39:12
- Label: DCide; Geffen
- Producer: Trust Company; Don Gilmore; Howard Benson

Trust Company chronology
The Lonely Position of Neutral (2002)	True Parallels (2005)	Dreaming in Black and White (2011)

Singles from True Parallels
- 1. "Stronger" Released: February 8, 2005

Professional ratings
Review scores
Source	Rating
411mania.com	(7.5/10)
AllMusic	2/5 stars
Sputnikmusic	3/5 stars

True Parallels is the second studio album by American rock band Trust Company. Originally to be released in 2004, the release date was pushed back to March 21, 2005, internationally and on March 22, 2005, in the United States. Despite little promotion from their label, the album entered the Billboard album charts at number 32 and has gone on to sell in excess of 200,000 copies.

== Background ==
Trust Company was originally scheduled to play at Ozzfest 2003, but canceled to focus on finishing True Parallels. Several months prior to the album's release, original bassist Josh Moates left the group and was replaced by Walker Warren.

"Stronger" was released in February 2005 as the album's single. It has two versions for the music videos, the original version features the band performing at a party. The video was unreleased until it was uploaded in May 2017 by former bassist Walker Warren and was later posted on Trust Company's Facebook page, the MTV2 version which received moderate airplay, features the band performing in a skatepark. According to drummer Jason Singleton on the band's message board, "The War is Over" gained much popularity within the World of Warcraft film-making community and was considered for a second single.

When they were known as 41Down, the track that bore the title of this album was later remade for their album The Lonely Position of Neutral as the track "Falling Apart".

== Track listing ==
All tracks are written by Trust Company, except where noted.

No.	Title	Writer(s)	Length
1.	"Stronger"		2:50
2.	"The War is Over"	Trust Company; Desmond Child	3:20
3.	"Surfacing"	Trust Company; Josh Moates	2:49
4.	"Slave"		3:15
5.	"Fold"		3:32
6.	"The Reflection"		3:17
7.	"Breaking Down"		3:33
8.	"Someone Like You"		2:52
9.	"Crossing the Line"	Trust Company; Moates	3:58
10.	"Silently"		3:37
11.	"Erased"	Trust Company; Moates	3:18
12.	"Without a Trace"	Trust Company; Moates	2:51
Total length:			39:12

Hidden track
No.	Title	Length
1.	"Retina"	3:15

Japanese bonus track
No.	Title	Writer(s)	Length
13.	"Time After Time"	Cyndi Lauper; Rob Hyman	3:23

== Personnel ==
Credits adapted from the CD liner notes.

=== TRUSTcompany ===
- James Fukai – guitar, background vocals, art direction
- Kevin Palmer – guitar, vocals, art direction
- Jason Singleton – drums, background vocals, art direction
- Josh Moates – bass (3–12), art direction
- Chris Cheney – bass (1 & 2)

=== Technical ===
- Ted Jensen – mastering at Sterling Sound, New York City
- Jordan Schur – executive producer
- Jason Harter for i-psyte Design – art direction

==== Tracks 1 & 2 ====
- Howard Benson – producer, keyboards, programming
- Mike Plotnikoff – engineer
- Eric Miller – additional engineering
- Paul Decarli – Pro Tools editing
- Chris Lord-Alge – mixing at Image Recording Studio, Hollywood, CA
- Dmitar Kmjaic – mixing assistant
- Gersh – drum tech
- Keith Nelson – guitar tech
- Doug Robb – background vocals (1)

==== Tracks 3–12 ====
- Don Gilmore – producer, engineer, mixing at NRG Recording Studios, North Hollywood, CA
- John Ewing Jr. – engineer
- Fox Phelps – 2nd engineer
- Jeffrey Rabhan – additional percussion (4–10)

== Charts ==
Album – Billboard (United States)

Year	Chart	Position
2005	Billboard 200	32

Singles – Billboard (United States)

Year	Single	Chart	Position
2005	"Stronger"	Mainstream Rock Tracks	22
2005	"Stronger"	Modern Rock Tracks	20

== Appearances ==
- "Stronger" was featured in the video game MX vs. ATV Unleashed in 2005. It was also the theme song to a WWE pay-per-view at Backlash 2005.
- "Surfacing" was featured in the video game MVP Baseball 2004 by EA Sports.
