= The Sound of Regret =

Studio album by Amity Lane
- Released: October 31, 2006
- Genre: Alternative metal Alternative rock
- Length: 45:40
- Label: Corporate Punishment
- Producer: Kevin Palmer and Josh Moates

Professional ratings
Review scores
Source	Rating
Allmusic	3/5 stars

The Sound of Regret is the debut album by the American alternative rock band Amity Lane. The album was released on October 31, 2006 via Corporate Punishment Records. The band is notable for featuring two members from Trust Company, in vocalist Kevin Palmer and original bassist Josh Moates along with new members Layla Palmer and Jason Rash.

== Track listing ==
1. "Drown You Out" – 3:01
2. "Shutting Eyes" – 3:48
3. "Die for You" – 3:14
4. "Waiting for Goodbye" – 3:43
5. "Running Away" – 3:34
6. "Edge of Your Heart" – 4:11
7. "Million Miles Away" – 3:36
8. "Broken Wings" – 3:56
9. "Every Part of You" – 3:04
10. "The Avenue" – 3:48
11. "Say Goodnight" – 9:41

- Contains the hidden track "The Angel's Song" - 2:19
