= Amity Lane =

American alternative rock band

Background information
- Origin: Montgomery, Alabama, U.S.
- Genres: Alternative rock
- Years active: 2005–2007 (on hiatus)
- Labels: Corporate Punishment
- Members: Kevin Palmer; Layla Palmer; Josh Moates; Jason Rash
- Website: amitylane.com

Amity Lane was an American alternative rock band from Montgomery, Alabama, formed in 2005. It featured two former members of the rock band Trust Company, vocalist Kevin Palmer and bassist Josh Moates. Amity Lane's debut album, The Sound of Regret, was released in October 2006. In 2007, Trust Company announced it was reuniting. It is unknown if Amity Lane will continue or disband.

== Members ==
- Kevin Palmer – lead vocals, guitar
- Josh Moates – bass
- Jason Rash – noiseboards, samples, sounds
- Eric Salter – guitar

== Discography ==
| Release date | Title | Label |
|---|---|---|
| October 31, 2006 | The Sound of Regret | Corporate Punishment |

== See also ==
- Trust Company
