= Trust Company (band) =

American rock band

- Also known as: 41Down (1997–2002)
- Origin: Montgomery, Alabama, U.S.
- Genres: Alternative metal; nu metal; hard rock; alternative rock
- Years active: 1997–2005; 2007–present
- Labels: DCide; Geffen; Entertainment One
- Spinoffs: Amity Lane
- Members: Kevin Palmer; James Fukai; Jason Singleton; Josh Moates
- Past members: Walker Warren; Eric Salter; Wes Cobb

Trust Company (also typeset as TRUSTcompany and TRUST*CO) is an American rock band from Montgomery, Alabama. Formed in 1997 by guitarist/lead vocalist Kevin Palmer and drummer Jason Singleton, Trust Company has sold over 1 million albums worldwide. They are best known for their 2002 song "Downfall".

== History ==
=== Formation and The Lonely Position of Neutral (1997–2002) ===
Originally formed in Montgomery, Alabama in 1997 under the name 41Down, the band began with vocalist/guitarist Kevin Palmer and drummer Jason Singleton before recruiting bassist Josh Moates and guitarist James Fukai. After building a local fan-base and releasing a self-titled album as well as a couple demos, the band went on to sign a major label deal with Geffen Records. On March 3, 2002, the band changed their name to Trust Company to avoid confusion with the Canadian band Sum 41.

Trust Company's debut album, The Lonely Position of Neutral, was released on July 23, 2002. The album was well received, with the lead single, "Downfall," gaining heavy exposure through MTV2. Subsequently, the song entered the Billboard Hot 100 singles charts. A second single "Running from Me" followed with more moderate success. "The Fear" was released in 2003 as the album's third single. The Lonely Position of Neutral was certified gold by the RIAA, and the band went on to tour with artists such as Thirty Seconds to Mars and Papa Roach. They also toured with Korn and Disturbed as part of the Pop Sux Tour in 2002.

=== True Parallels and hiatus (2003–2006) ===
Trust Company was scheduled to play at Ozzfest 2003 but was forced to back out by their label in order to work on their second album, True Parallels, which was belatedly released on March 22, 2005, after an 8–10 month delay. Several months prior to the album's release, original bassist Josh Moates left the group and was replaced by Walker Warren. Despite little promotion from their label, the album entered the Billboard album charts at No. 32, and has gone on to sell in excess of 200,000 copies. The first and only single from the album, "Stronger," made a moderate impact on mainstream rock radio. According to drummer Jason Singleton on the band's website message board, the second single may have been "The War is Over."

In August 2005, the band decided to take a break and focus on side projects and spend some time at home. Soon after the break, Palmer and original bassist Josh Moates came together to form a new band called Amity Lane. The band released its debut album The Sound of Regret on October 31, 2006. In an interview with IndyConcerts.com following their show in Indianapolis on April 6, 2011, Kevin Palmer was quoted as saying the Amity Lane album was never intended to be released. The whole album was just a fun side project and not even studio-produced. Palmer went on to say that he and Moates recorded the whole album on a computer. Jason Singleton played drums for several bands in Montgomery, including Arm in Arms, The Spicolis, and The Escape Frame. James Fukai reunited with his old band, Hematovore.

=== Reunion, Dreaming in Black and White and inactivity (2007–present) ===
On August 11, 2007, the four original members of the band – Palmer, Moates, Singleton, and Fukai – announced they were reuniting and planned two reunion shows in Montgomery, Alabama and that they will be writing and recording a new album for release sometime in 2008. On March 18, 2008, the band posted two new songs titled "Waking Up" and "Stumbling" on their Myspace page. The band stated in a blog that these were demos and may be re-recorded. They later announced that they would be handing out CDs with previously unreleased or rare material from past years at concerts with the purchase of a T-shirt.

Josh Moates chose to leave the band and was replaced by bassist Eric Salter. Eric Salter left the band in 2009 and was replaced by Wes Cobb.

Trust Company carried out a small US tour at the end of 2010 to promote their new single, "Heart in My Hands", from their third studio album, Dreaming in Black and White, which was released on March 8, 2011. The lead single was released on iTunes on October 5, 2010. In late October 2010, the band finished the music video for "Heart in My Hands" and the video premiered on Vevo on December 15, 2010. The music video features bass player Rachel Bolan of heavy metal band Skid Row. The band went on a two-month tour with Drowning Pool on the promotion of the album.

Trust Company's social media has been virtually untouched since 2015, except for on March 3, 2017, when the original unreleased music video for "Stronger" was posted on Facebook, and a post made on Twitter on March 7, 2017, marking 15 years since The Lonely Position of Neutral was released.

On October 16, 2017 the official Trust Company Twitter account replied to a fan and stated that a new album is currently in the process of being written. After another two years of inactivity, the band's Twitter again confirmed that a new album was in the process of being written on February 22, 2020, although the band stated that it did not have plans to tour at that time. Trust Company's original lineup performed at Blue Ridge Rock Festival in 2023. As of 2026, the band has five original songs ready.

== Musical style ==
Trust Company has been described as alternative metal, nu metal, hard rock, and alternative rock.

== Members ==
Current members

- Kevin Palmer – lead vocals, rhythm guitar (1997–2005, 2007–present)
- James Fukai – lead guitar, backing vocals (1997–2005, 2007–present)
- Jason Singleton – drums, backing vocals (1997–2005, 2007–present)
- Josh Moates – bass, backing vocals (1997–2004, 2007–2008, 2022–present)

Former members

- Walker Warren – bass, backing vocals (2004–2005)
- Eric Salter – bass, backing vocals (2008–2009)
- Wes Cobb – bass, backing vocals (2009–2011)

== Discography ==
Studio albums

Album details	Chart positions	Sales	Certifications
Album details	US	Sales	Certifications
The Lonely Position of Neutral: Released: July 23, 2002; Label: Geffen	11	US sales: 500,000	RIAA: Gold
True Parallels: Released: March 22, 2005; Label: Geffen	32	US sales: 200,000	
Dreaming in Black and White: Released: March 8, 2011; Label: Entertainment One	175		

Compilation album

In 2010, via Myspace, Trust Company gave their fans the opportunity to obtain a Previously Unreleased LP for free after purchasing a T-shirt from their online store. The album contains rare demos and tracks not included in their previous two albums. The track listing is as follows:

1. "Stronger" (Piano with drum loop version)
2. "Closer"
3. "I Can't Breathe"
4. "Seasons Change"
5. "Today"
6. "Moving in Circles"
7. "Hover" (Quiet mix) [Underworld soundtrack]
8. "Sterilize"
9. "Something Perfect" (New version)
10. "Losing View"
11. "Rock the Casbah" (The Clash cover)
12. "Time After Time" (Cyndi Lauper cover)

Singles

Year	Song	Chart positions				Album
Year	Song	US	US Alt.	US Main.	UK	Album
2002	"Downfall"	91	6	6	89	The Lonely Position of Neutral
2002	"Running from Me"	—	22	24	—	The Lonely Position of Neutral
2003	"The Fear"	—	—	—	—	The Lonely Position of Neutral
2005	"Stronger"	—	20	22	—	True Parallels
2010	"Heart in My Hands"	—	—	—	—	Dreaming in Black and White
"—" denotes a release that did not chart.
