= Royal Rumble (2003) =

World Wrestling Entertainment pay-per-view event

- Promotional poster featuring Triple H
- Promotion: World Wrestling Entertainment
- Brand(s): Raw; SmackDown!
- Date: January 19, 2003
- City: Boston, Massachusetts
- Venue: FleetCenter
- Attendance: 15,338
- Buy rate: 585,000

Pay-per-view chronology
← Previous; Armageddon	Next → No Way Out

Royal Rumble chronology
← Previous; 2002	Next → 2004

The 2003 Royal Rumble was a professional wrestling pay-per-view (PPV) event produced by World Wrestling Entertainment (WWE), held for wrestlers from the promotion's Raw and SmackDown! brand divisions. It was the 16th annual Royal Rumble event and took place on January 19, 2003, at the FleetCenter in Boston, Massachusetts. This was the first Royal Rumble held after the first brand split was introduced in March 2002 and it was also the first Royal Rumble produced under the WWE name after the promotion was renamed from World Wrestling Federation (WWF) to WWE in May 2002.

The event was based around the men's Royal Rumble match, a modified 30-man battle royal in which the participants enter at timed intervals instead of all beginning in the ring at the same time with the winner receiving a world championship match at WrestleMania. Previously, there was only one world championship to challenge for at WrestleMania, but due to the brand split, which led to the creation of a second world championship with each brand having its own top title, the 2003 Royal Rumble winner received a match for their respective brand's world championship at WrestleMania XIX, either Raw's World Heavyweight Championship or SmackDown!'s WWE Championship. This was in turn the first time in which two world championships were eligible to be challenged for by the winner.

Six matches were contested at the event, as well as one match taped for the Sunday Night Heat pre-show. The main event was the 2003 Royal Rumble match, which was won by SmackDown!'s Brock Lesnar, who last eliminated The Undertaker, also from SmackDown!. On the undercard, the primary match for Raw saw Triple H versus Scott Steiner for the World Heavyweight Championship, which Steiner won by disqualification resulting in Triple H retaining the championship as titles do not change hands by disqualification unless stipulated. The main match for SmackDown! was between Kurt Angle and Chris Benoit for the WWE Championship, which Angle won by making Benoit submit to the Ankle Lock, thus retaining the championship.

== Production ==
=== Background ===
The 16th annual Royal Rumble event was held at the FleetCenter in Boston, Massachusetts.

The Royal Rumble is an annual professional wrestling event, produced every January by World Wrestling Entertainment (WWE) since 1988; that first event was a television special before it became an annual pay-per-view (PPV) beginning in 1989. It is one of the promotion's original four pay-per-views, along with WrestleMania, SummerSlam, and Survivor Series, referred to as the "Big Four", and was considered one of the "Big Five" PPVs with the addition of King of the Ring in 1993 until it was discontinued as an annual PPV after its June 2002 event. It is named after and centered on the men's Royal Rumble match. The 16th Royal Rumble event took place on January 19, 2003, at the FleetCenter in Boston, Massachusetts.

This was the first Royal Rumble to occur under the first brand extension introduced in March 2002, which split the roster between the Raw and SmackDown! brands where wrestlers were exclusively assigned to perform on their respective shows. The 2003 event in turn included wrestlers from both brands. It was also the first Royal Rumble held under the WWE name, following the promotion being renamed from World Wrestling Federation (WWF) to WWE in May 2002.

The Royal Rumble match is a modified battle royal in which the participants enter at timed intervals instead of all beginning in the ring at the same time, and the match generally features 30 wrestlers. Since 1993, the winner earns a world championship match at that year's WrestleMania. Previously, there was only one world championship to challenge for at WrestleMania. As a result of the brand extension, which led to the creation of a second world championship with each brand having its own top title, the winner of the 2003 Royal Rumble match earned a match for their brand's top championship at WrestleMania XIX: Raw's World Heavyweight Championship or SmackDown!'s WWE Championship. This made it the first Royal Rumble to feature the World Heavyweight Championship, following its introduction on Raw in September 2002 after the WWE Undisputed Championship became exclusive to SmackDown! and was renamed as WWE Championship. This was subsequently also the first time in which two world championships were eligible to be challenged for by the winner of the titular match.

=== Storylines ===
The event comprised six matches that resulted from scripted storylines. Results were predetermined by WWE's writers on the Raw and SmackDown! brands, while storylines were produced on WWE's weekly television shows, Raw and SmackDown!.

The buildup to the Royal Rumble match began on the December 23, 2002 episode of Raw, when Raw General Manager Eric Bischoff informed viewers that the upcoming Royal Rumble match would feature 15 wrestlers representing the Raw brand and 15 wrestlers representing the SmackDown! brand, since this would be the first Royal Rumble match to take place after WWE's brand extension. The buildup continued on the January 2 episode of SmackDown!, where a vignette aired hyping the impending return of The Undertaker in the Royal Rumble match. Later that night, Paul Heyman announced that Brock Lesnar and Big Show would wrestle in a match at the PPV, with the winner receiving a spot in the Royal Rumble match. On the January 6 episode of Raw, Chris Jericho and Shawn Michaels argued over who would be drawing the #1 entry in the Royal Rumble match. On the January 13 episode of Raw, a Royal Rumble qualification match took place in which Jeff Hardy defeated Raven. Later that night, Jericho defeated Batista, Kane and Rob Van Dam in an over the top rope Challenge to earn the right choose an entry number of his choice. Jericho chose #2 because #1 was already given to Michaels.

Royal Rumble qualification matches

- Jeff Hardy defeated Raven - Raw January 13
- Chris Jericho defeated Batista, Kane, and Rob Van Dam in a battle royal Raw January 13

The main feud heading into the event from the SmackDown! brand was between Kurt Angle and Chris Benoit over the WWE Championship. At Armageddon, Angle defeated Big Show after interference from Brock Lesnar, to win his third WWE Championship. Prior to Armageddon, Angle had promised Lesnar that he would get his suspension lifted if he aided Angle in defeating Big Show. Angle had also promised to give Lesnar the first title shot after winning the championship. However, despite helping Angle win the title, Lesnar was not given his title shot as promised. On the December 19 episode of SmackDown!, Angle announced that he had hired Paul Heyman as his manager and that the two had conspired to get Lesnar reinstated just prior to Armageddon, only to reinforce a stipulation that Heyman had written into Lesnar's contract that he would not receive a title shot if he had lost to Heyman's other client, Big Show, at Survivor Series. Instead, Angle signed to defend against Big Show, who was irate about being used by Heyman and Angle, but went along due to promises made to him by Heyman. Later that night, Angle lost to Benoit in a non-title match by disqualification when Big Show interfered in the match and attacked Benoit. However, Lesnar rescued Benoit from the post-match assault by Angle and Big Show and brutally assaulted Angle, injuring him. On the December 26 episode of SmackDown!, as a result of Angle's injury, the SmackDown! General Manager Stephanie McMahon cancelled Angle's scheduled title match against Big Show and decided that Big Show would wrestle Benoit to determine the number one contender for the WWE Championship at the Royal Rumble; Benoit won the match.

The main rivalry heading into the event from the Raw brand was between Triple H and Scott Steiner over the World Heavyweight Championship. On October 24, WWE had announced on its official website that Scott Steiner had signed a three-year contract with WWE. After eight years away from the company, Steiner returned to WWE as a free agent at Survivor Series and attacked Matt Hardy and Christopher Nowinski for insulting New York City. Steiner was then approached by both the Raw General Manager Eric Bischoff and the SmackDown! General Manager Stephanie McMahon, each looking to sign Steiner to their respective brands. He initially decided to join the SmackDown! brand, but after McMahon rejected Steiner's advances, he moved to the Raw brand. At Armageddon, Triple H defeated Shawn Michaels in a Three Stages of Hell to win the World Heavyweight Championship. The following night on Raw, Triple H held an Appreciation Ceremony on winning the title but the ceremony was interrupted by Steiner, who announced that his contract said that he would earn a world title shot. As a result, Steiner and Triple H's match for the World Heavyweight Championship was made official for the Royal Rumble.

The secondary rivalry heading into the event from the Raw brand was between Lance Storm and William Regal and The Dudley Boyz (Bubba Ray Dudley and D-Von Dudley) over the World Tag Team Championship. On the December 23 episode of Raw, General Manager Eric Bischoff forced Raw commentators Jim Ross and Jerry Lawler to wrestle in a tag team match against Storm and Regal for making bad comments against Bischoff. Ross and Lawler defeated Storm and Regal after interference by the Dudley Boyz. As a result, on the January 6 episode of Raw, Bischoff forced the Dudley Boyz to wrestle 3-Minute Warning (Rosey and Jamal), Rico and Batista in a handicap match. Storm and Regal avenged their loss by costing the Dudley Boyz the match. Later that night, Storm and Regal defeated Booker T and Goldust for the World Tag Team Championship. This led to a title match being signed between Storm and Regal and the Dudley Boyz at the Royal Rumble.

The secondary rivalry heading into the event from the SmackDown! brand was between Torrie Wilson and Dawn Marie. At Armageddon, Torrie and Dawn did a lesbian segment in a hotel room. On the December 19 episode of SmackDown!, Torrie gave bad remarks about her storyline father Al Wilson on getting married with Dawn. On the January 2 episode of SmackDown!, Dawn and Al had their storyline wedding in their undergarments. On the January 9 episode of SmackDown!, Josh Mathews announced that Dawn and Torrie would wrestle in a match at Royal Rumble billed as a "Stepmother" vs "Stepdaughter" match.

== Event ==
Other on-screen personnel
Role:	Name:
English commentators	Jim Ross (Raw and Royal Rumble)
English commentators	Jerry Lawler (Raw and Royal Rumble)
English commentators	Michael Cole (SmackDown!)
English commentators	Tazz (SmackDown!)
Spanish commentators	Carlos Cabrera
Spanish commentators	Hugo Savinovich
Interviewer	Jonathan Coachman
Ring announcer	Howard Finkel (Raw)
Ring announcer	Tony Chimel (SmackDown!)
Referees	Charles Robinson (Raw)
Referees	Nick Patrick (Raw)
Referees	Jack Doan (Raw)
Referees	Earl Hebner (Raw)
Referees	Mike Chioda (SmackDown!)
Referees	Jim Korderas (SmackDown!)
Referees	Brian Hebner (SmackDown!)
Referees	Mike Sparks (SmackDown!)
Referees	Chad Patton
Referees	Jacqueline (Sunday Night Heat)
General managers	Eric Bischoff (Raw)
General managers	Stephanie McMahon (SmackDown!)

Before the event aired live on pay-per-view, Spike Dudley defeated Steven Richards by pinning him after a Dudley Dog. The match aired live on Sunday Night Heat.

=== Preliminary matches ===
The first match was a Royal Rumble qualification match between Big Show and Brock Lesnar. After Paul Heyman distracted Lesnar, Big Show executed a chokeslam on Lesnar for a near-fall. Big Show attempted another chokeslam on Lesnar, but Lesnar countered the move and pushed Big Show into Heyman, causing Heyman to fall off the ring apron. Lesnar executed an F-5 on Big Show to win the match and qualify for the Royal Rumble match. A backstage interview occurred next where Terri Runnels questioned Chris Jericho why he decided to enter the Royal Rumble at number 2 instead of number 30. Jericho said he was trying to make himself famous because Shawn Michaels was entering at number 1 (Which he won from in the 1995 Royal Rumble and who he was feuding with).

The second match was a tag team match for the World Tag Team Championship between Lance Storm and William Regal and The Dudley Boyz (Bubba Ray Dudley and D-Von Dudley). The Dudley Boyz attempted a 3D on Storm, but Chief Morley interfered in the match and decided that Storm and Regal retained the title by disqualification, but the referee refused and the match continued. Regal attempted to hit The Dudley Boyz with a pair of brass knuckles, but The Dudley Boyz performed a 3D on Regal. D-Von hit Storm with the brass knuckles and pinned him to win the titles.

The next match was between Torrie Wilson and Dawn Marie. Wilson performed a swinging neckbreaker on Marie to win the match.

=== Main event matches ===
The fourth match was between Triple H and Scott Steiner for the World Heavyweight Championship. Steiner attempted a Steiner Recliner on Triple H, but Triple H's manager Ric Flair pulled Triple H out of the ring. Steiner chased Flair, but the referee interjected himself to stop Steiner. Triple H attempted a Pedigree on Steiner, but Steiner countered and performed an exploder suplex. Steiner attempted a military press slam, but Triple H countered with a neckbreaker for a near-fall. Flair interfered in the match, prompting the referee to eject him from ringside. Triple H threw the referee out of the ring, but the referee did not disqualify Triple H. Triple H hit Steiner with a sledgehammer, meaning Steiner won by disqualification, but Triple H retained the title. After the match, Steiner applied the Steiner Recliner on Triple H.

The next match was between Kurt Angle and Chris Benoit for the WWE Championship. Team Angle (Charlie Haas and Shelton Benjamin) were ejected from ringside before the match. Benoit attempted a diving headbutt on Angle, but Angle avoided the move and attempted an Angle Slam on Benoit, but Benoit countered. Benoit applied the sharpshooter on Angle, but Angle grabbed the ropes to force a break. Angle attempted an Angle Slam, but Benoit countered the move into the Crippler Crossface, but Angle once again grabbed the ropes. Benoit applied the ankle lock on Angle, until Angle countered the hold into an ankle lock on Benoit. Benoit countered the hold into the Crippler Crossface, but Angle countered the move into an Angle Slam for a near-fall. Benoit executed a diving headbutt for a near-fall. Angle performed a super Angle Slam for a near-fall. Benoit applied a Crippler Crossface on Angle, but Angle countered it into a modified ankle lock, forcing Benoit to submit to the hold to retain the title. Afterwards, Benoit received a standing ovation from the crowd for his performance.

The main event was the Royal Rumble match. The first two entrants were Shawn Michaels and Chris Jericho. Christian appeared during Jericho's entrance, wearing Jericho's gear and distracting Michaels. Jericho snuck in from the crowd and attacked Michaels from behind. He then hit Michaels with a chair, causing Michaels to bleed. Christopher Nowinski entered at #3 but instead of entering the ring, he stayed outside the ring. Jericho continued to attack Michaels before easily eliminating him. Rey Mysterio entered at #4 and started fighting Jericho while Nowinski stayed out of the ring before eventually attacking Mysterio. Edge entered at #5 and performed Spears on both Jericho and Nowinski. He attempted a Spear on Mysterio, but Mysterio countered and attempted a 619 on Edge, with Edge avoiding the move. Mysterio and Edge continued to fight until Christian officially entered at #6. After entering the ring, Christian attempted to embrace and reconcile with his former tag team partner Edge, but was speared by Edge. Edge and Mysterio then performed a double missile dropkick on Nowinski. The move was somewhat botched, causing Edge to land directly onto Nowinski's face, causing legitimate injuries.

Chavo Guerrero entered at #7. After entering the ring, Guerrero was attacked by Mysterio. Mysterio then eliminated Nowinski from the match. However, after eliminating Nowinski, Mysterio himself was eliminated by Jericho. Tajiri entered at #8. Tajiri fought with Christian, while Edge and Jericho fought with each other. Bill DeMott entered at #9. DeMott started attacking all the participants and nearly eliminated Jericho. Tommy Dreamer entered at #10. Dreamer brought a trashcan with lids and kendo sticks to the ring with him and started attacking everyone. Edge hit DeMott with a kendo stick, causing DeMott to get eliminated by falling over the top rope to the floor. Jericho and Christian then attacked Dreamer with trashcan lids and tossed him over the top rope. Tajiri fought with Jericho and attempted to apply a Tarantula on Jericho but his attempt failed, and Jericho dumped Tajiri over the top rope, eliminating him. B2 entered at #11 but was quickly eliminated by Edge, who then also eliminated Guerrero. Edge also attempted to eliminate Jericho, but he held on. Edge and Christian fought each other until Jericho eliminated both of them from the match and became the only remaining person in the ring until Rob Van Dam entered at #12. After entering the ring, Van Dam began attacking Jericho and performed a Rolling Thunder.

Van Dam and Jericho continued to battle each other, and Van Dam had nearly eliminated Jericho until Matt Hardy entered at #13 and performed a Side Effect on Van Dam. Jericho and Hardy double-teamed Van Dam until Eddie Guerrero entered at #14 and began attacking Van Dam and Hardy. Guerrero and Hardy then double-teamed Van Dam, where Hardy helped Guerrero from being eliminated and performed a Scoop Slam on Van Dam, allowing Guerrero to perform a Frog Splash. However, Hardy ended his teamwork with Guerrero by performing a Twist of Fate. Jeff Hardy entered at #15 and Jeff began fighting Matt. Jeff performed a Twist of Fate on Matt and climbed the top rope to perform a Swanton Bomb, but Matt's manager Shannon Moore joined the ring and covered Matt with his body in an attempt to protect him. Jeff performed a Swanton Bomb on Moore, that hurt both Matt and Moore. Rosey entered at #16 and started fighting with Van Dam until Test entered at #17 and started attacking everyone in the ring. Test performed a Pumphandle Slam on Matt and began attacking Jericho and had nearly eliminated him. John Cena entered at #18, but instead of immediately entering the ring, Cena began rapping on his way down to ringside, entering the ring after finishing his rap.

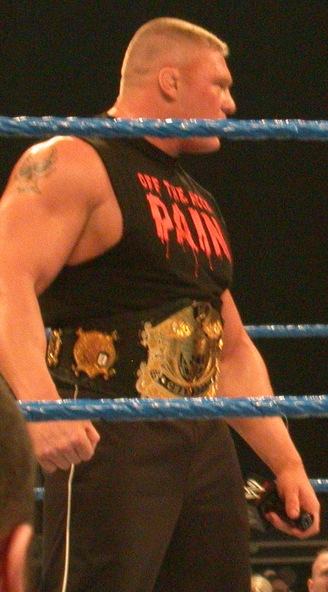
Brock Lesnar won the 2003 Royal Rumble match.

Charlie Haas entered at #19. Haas started fighting with Matt. Van Dam and Jeff started double-teaming Jericho. Jeff climbed on the top rope to perform a high-flying move, but Van Dam pushed him, causing Jeff to fall to the floor and be eliminated from the match. Rikishi entered at #20 and started fighting Rosey. Jamal entered at #21 and began teaming with his 3-Minute Warning partner Rosey to double-team Rikishi. Jericho fought with Van Dam and had nearly eliminated Van Dam, until Kane entered at #22 and started dominating all the participants in the ring. Kane eliminated Rosey by backdropping him over the top rope. After eliminating Rosey, Kane attempted to eliminate Jericho, but Jericho held on. Shelton Benjamin entered at #23 and began teaming with his Team Angle partner Haas. Booker T entered at #24 and performed a Scissors Kick on Kane and a Flapjack on Matt. Booker went on to eliminate Guerrero by backdropping him over the top rope.

A-Train entered at #25 and started dominating his opponents by performing a Derailer on Cena, a Train Wreck on Benjamin and a Derailer on Van Dam before receiving a Savate Kick by Rikishi. Shawn Michaels angrily returned to the ring after being attacked by Jericho earlier in the match and avenged his elimination by attacking Jericho, allowing Test to take advantage and eliminate Jericho from the match. Michaels and Jericho continued to brawl to the backstage area. Maven entered at #26 but was dominated by Kane. Goldust entered at #27 and started battling Haas and Benjamin, but was quickly eliminated by them. Goldust's tag team partner Booker tried to avenge his partner's elimination by battling Haas and Benjamin, but he too was eliminated by Haas and Benjamin. Batista entered at #28 and started dominating everyone. Shortly after entering, Batista eliminated Test and then Rikishi. Brock Lesnar entered at #29 and started fighting all the participants. Lesnar eliminated Haas and Benjamin and then eliminated Matt by performing an F-5, which sent Matt over the top rope onto Haas and Benjamin. Batista and Lesnar then had a stand off. Finally, The Undertaker returned to WWE after a three-month injury hiatus by entering at #30 as the final entrant of the match.

Undertaker quickly eliminated Cena and then eliminated Jamal. Maven attacked Undertaker from behind, trying to eliminate him for the second consecutive year, but Undertaker recovered and eliminated Maven. Kane and Van Dam started to double-team A-Train, clotheslining and eliminating him. Afterwards, it looked as if Kane was going to Gorilla press slam Van Dam on Batista, but instead Kane tossed Van Dam over the top rope, eliminating him from the match. Kane and Batista started teaming as they were the remaining participants from Raw and battled Lesnar and Undertaker, who were the remaining participants from SmackDown!. Undertaker eventually eliminated Batista and then battled Kane before eliminating him. Batista was angered at his elimination, so he angrily re-entered the ring and attempted to hit Undertaker with a chair, but Undertaker avoided it and nailed Batista with the chair instead. Lesnar took advantage of the situation and eliminated a distracted Undertaker to win the Royal Rumble match.

== Aftermath ==
=== Raw ===
After retaining the World Heavyweight Championship against Scott Steiner by getting disqualified, Triple H continued his rivalry with Steiner over the title. On the February 3 episode of Raw, Steiner became the number one contender for the title by defeating Chris Jericho. At No Way Out, Triple H defeated Steiner to retain the title.

=== SmackDown ===
Due to winning the Royal Rumble match as a SmackDown! wrestler, Brock Lesnar earned a WWE Championship match at WrestleMania XIX. As a result, he began a rivalry with the WWE Champion Kurt Angle. Chris Benoit also continued his rivalry with Angle after losing to him at Royal Rumble. At No Way Out, Lesnar, Benoit and Edge were scheduled to take on Team Angle (Kurt Angle, Charlie Haas and Shelton Benjamin) in a six-man tag team match, but Edge suffered a severe neck injury before the event, leading him to be written off of WWE television for over a year. As a result, the match became a handicap match; however, Lesnar and Benoit managed to defeat Team Angle. At WrestleMania XIX, Lesnar defeated Angle to win the WWE Championship.

== Results ==
No.	Results	Stipulations	Times
1^{H}	Spike Dudley defeated Steven Richards (with Victoria)	Singles match	3:36
2	Brock Lesnar defeated Big Show (with Paul Heyman)	Singles match for entry in the Royal Rumble match	6:28
3	The Dudley Boyz (Bubba Ray Dudley and D-Von Dudley) defeated Lance Storm and William Regal (c)	Tag team match for the World Tag Team Championship	7:22
4	Torrie Wilson defeated Dawn Marie Wilson	Singles match	3:35
5	Scott Steiner defeated Triple H (c) (with Ric Flair) by disqualification	Singles match for the World Heavyweight Championship	17:03
6	Kurt Angle (c) defeated Chris Benoit by submission	Singles match for the WWE Championship	19:57
7	Brock Lesnar won by last eliminating The Undertaker	30-man Royal Rumble match for a world championship match at WrestleMania XIX	53:47
(c) / – the champion(s) heading into the match; H / – the match was broadcast prior to the pay-per-view on Sunday Night Heat

=== Royal Rumble entrances and eliminations ===
– Raw
– SmackDown!
– Winner

Draw	Entrant	Brand	Order eliminated	Eliminated by	Time	Eliminations
1	Shawn Michaels	Raw	1	Chris Jericho	02:05	0
2	Chris Jericho	Raw	14	Test	39:00	6
3	Christopher Nowinski	Raw	2	Rey Mysterio	04:37	0
4	Rey Mysterio	SmackDown!	3	Chris Jericho	05:55	1
5	Edge	SmackDown!	10	Chris Jericho	11:00	3
6	Christian	Raw	9	Chris Jericho	09:03	1
7	Chavo Guerrero	SmackDown!	8	Edge	07:10	0
8	Tajiri	SmackDown!	6	Chris Jericho	04:41	0
9	Bill DeMott	SmackDown!	4	Edge	02:13	0
10	Tommy Dreamer	Raw	5	Chris Jericho & Christian	00:48	0
11	B-2	SmackDown!	7	Edge	00:24	0
12	Rob Van Dam	Raw	26	Kane	33:00	2
13	Matt Hardy	SmackDown!	21	Brock Lesnar	27:13	0
14	Eddie Guerrero	SmackDown!	13	Booker T	16:29	0
15	Jeff Hardy	Raw	11	Rob Van Dam	07:26	0
16	Rosey	Raw	12	Kane	10:16	0
17	Test	Raw	17	Batista	18:45	1
18	John Cena	SmackDown!	22	The Undertaker	19:45	0
19	Charlie Haas	SmackDown!	19	Brock Lesnar	17:16	2
20	Rikishi	SmackDown!	18	Batista	14:55	0
21	Jamal	Raw	23	The Undertaker	16:07	0
22	Kane	Raw	28	The Undertaker	20:24	3
23	Shelton Benjamin	SmackDown!	20	Brock Lesnar	10:54	2
24	Booker T	Raw	16	Charlie Haas & Shelton Benjamin	06:20	1
25	A-Train	SmackDown!	25	Kane & Rob Van Dam	11:00	0
26	Maven	Raw	24	The Undertaker	08:19	0
27	Goldust	Raw	15	Charlie Haas & Shelton Benjamin	00:47	0
28	Batista	Raw	27	The Undertaker	09:55	2
29	Brock Lesnar	SmackDown!	—	Winner	09:00	4
30	The Undertaker	SmackDown!	29	Brock Lesnar	06:45	5
