= Leg drop =

Professional wrestling move

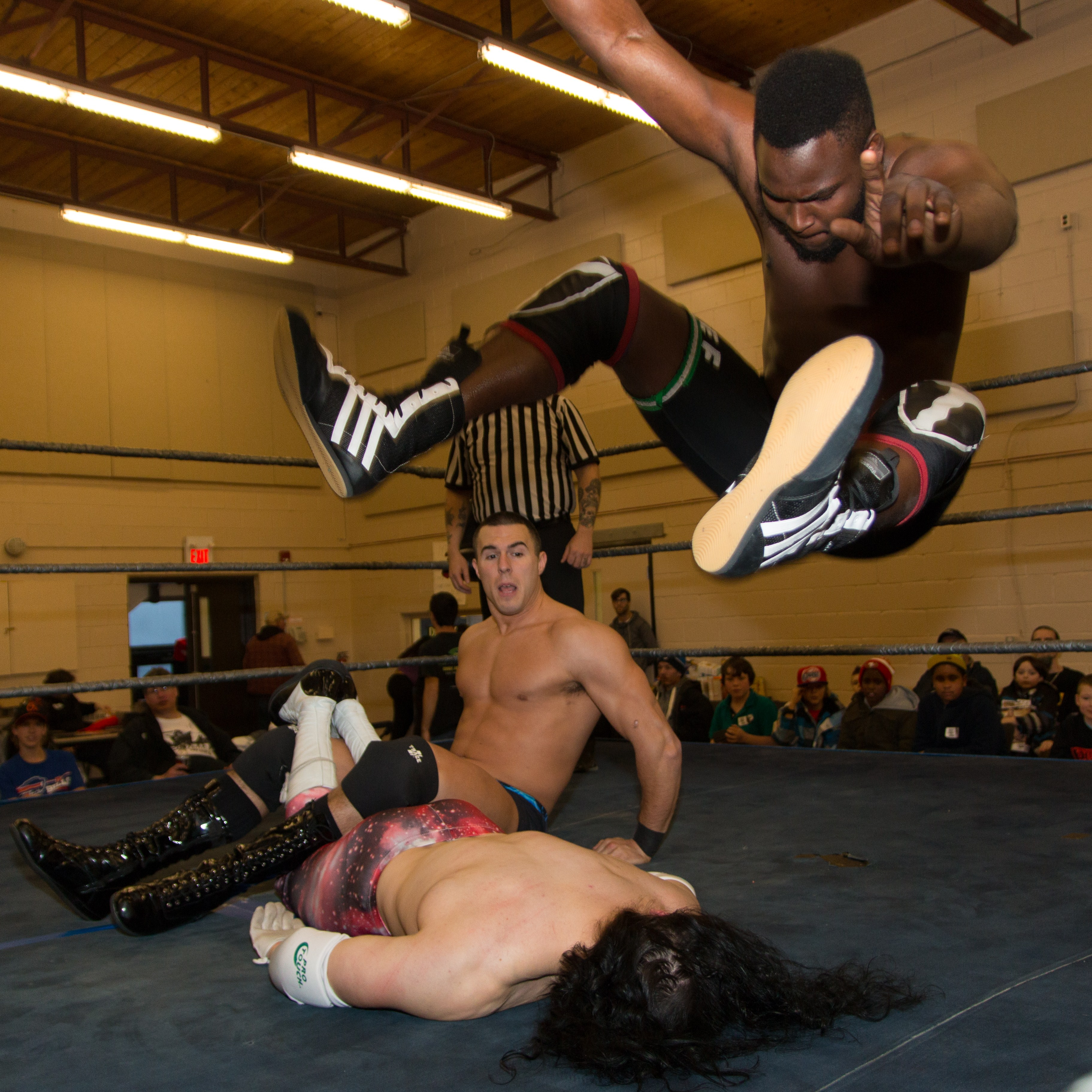
Chief Ade (right) executes a leg drop.

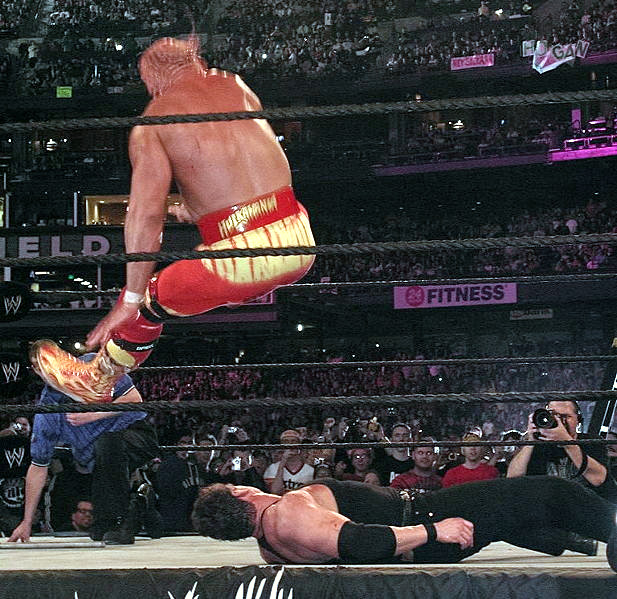
Hulk Hogan performing the Atomic Leg Drop (running leg drop) on Mr. McMahon

A leg drop or legdrop refers to an attack used in professional wrestling in which an attacking wrestler will jump and land his leg across a fallen opponent's chest, throat, face or head or in some cases, the groin/lower-abdominal area.

The move can also be dangerous as when the wrestler excessively uses it many times it will damage their hip, lower back, and pelvis, as Hulk Hogan had multiple surgeries on his back and hip while Matt Hardy had his lower back and pelvis fused together.

== Variations ==
=== Discus leg drop ===
The wrestler spins 180° while they jump and land their leg across an opponent's chest, throat, face, or head.

Rob Van Dam utilizes this maneuver, jumping from the ring apron, the ringside barricade, or the second or top rope onto an opponent, who is usually laid out on the ground, hanging over the ring apron/ringside barricade, laying supine on the announcers' table/regular table, or trapped in the ring ropes. He also uses a standing version, but only on occasion.

=== Double leg drop ===
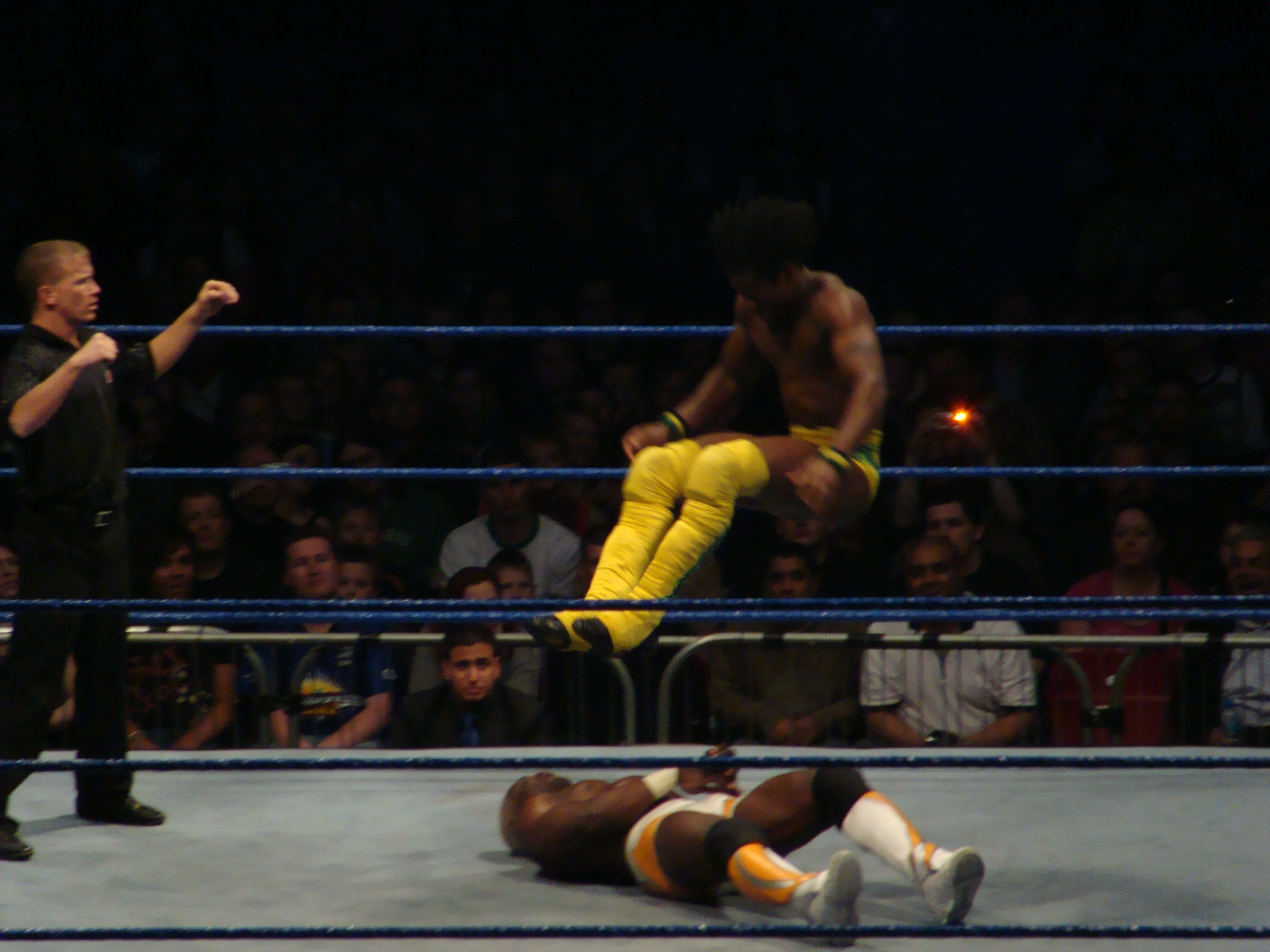
Kofi Kingston performing the Boom Drop (double leg drop) on Shelton Benjamin

This variation of the leg drop sees the wrestler drop both legs onto the opponent, usually onto their midsection, instead of just one leg. It was used by Kofi Kingston, who calls it the Boom Drop.

=== Extreme leg drop ===
This leg drop variation sees the attacking wrestler hold the opponent's legs and then do a double leg drop (legs together) onto the opponent's groin/lower-abdominal area. If performed to hit the lower abdomen, the user slightly bends their legs to force their heels into the lower abdomen. If it is to hit the groin area, the attacking wrestler bends out (that is to say, juts out their rear end) and keeps their legs straight to force the heels or lower legs into the groin. It was popularized by Jeff Hardy.

=== Guillotine leg drop ===
This move is similar to the leg drop, although it is done with the opponent's body hanging over something, sometimes with the opponent's head hung over one of the ring ropes or the ring apron (so the head is suspended over the outside). The wrestler will then walk across the apron and execute a leg drop onto the opponent's sternum, causing both of them to fall and land on the outside of the ring. This also refers to the attacker's leg hitting the opponent's throat in a standard leg drop.

Jumping leg drop

This variation sees a wrestler execute a jump before performing a standing or a running leg drop to an opponent's head, chest or midsection

=== Running leg drop ===
A variation to the original, the attacking wrestler bounces off from one side of the ring, runs and performs the leg drop across the opponent's chest. The running leg drop was famously Hulk Hogan's finishing move, usually preceded by a big boot.

Sliding leg drop

This variation sees the attacker perform a running or baseball slide towards an opponent lying on the mat, before using their momentum to perform a leg drop on the opponent's head, midsection, or back.

=== Slingshot leg drop ===
The attacker, while outside of the ring, pulls back on the ropes and, assisted by the rebound of the ropes, propels themselves into the ring and onto their victim. Variations include using the ropes for a slingshot somersault leg drop and a slingshot springboard (where the attacker leaps onto top of the ropes) diving leg drop. Another variant is when the attacker slingshots onto the opponent's neck. WWE wrestler Victoria used this move in many of her matches.

=== Somersault leg drop ===
An attacking wrestler performs a jumping forward somersault to drop their leg across the throat or chest of an opponent. There is also a variation where the leg that will be dropped on the opponent is swung forward while in a standing position next to the opponent, then swiftly swung back so the momentum from the pendulum motion carries the attacker through a somersault and the leg is dropped on whichever body part is targeted. Alicia Fox uses this move as a signature.

=== Split-legged leg drop ===
This is very similar to the actual leg drop, but there are two variations to this move. The first is that the attacking wrestler jumps, splits their legs in the air, then hits one of their legs on the opponent's chest/neck area. Another variation is that a standing wrestler hooks one of their leg up to their head, then falls in a split position on the opponent's chest/neck area; sometimes the attacking wrestler pins the opponent with a split. This move is usually performed by women, such as Christy Hemme, Naomi, Cameron, and Lyra Valkyria, who does a diving version of the move.

=== Springboard leg drop ===
An attacking wrestler jumps off the ring ropes from either inside the ring or from the apron, spreads their legs in the air, and lands one of their legs across their opponent's face, chest, or neck.

== See also ==
- Double leg drop – Two man tandem leg drop
- Diving leg drop – Leg drops from elevated positions
- Scissors kick – modified leg drop style attack
- Professional wrestling attacks
