= Matt Hardy =

American professional wrestler (born 1974)

- Hardy at GalaxyCon Des Moines in 2026

Personal information
- Born: Matthew Moore Hardy; September 23, 1974 (age 52) Cameron, North Carolina, U.S.
- Education: University of North Carolina at Charlotte; Sandhills Community College
- Spouse: Rebecca Reyes (m. 2013)
- Children: 4
- Relative: Jeff Hardy (brother)

Professional wrestling career
- Ring name(s): Broken Matt; Damascus; High Voltage; Ingus Jinx; Ishan Hardy; Matt Hardy; Rahway Reaper; Surge
- Billed height: 6 ft 2 in (188 cm)
- Billed weight: 236 lb (107 kg)
- Billed from: Cameron, North Carolina; The Hardy Compound in Cameron, North Carolina
- Trained by: Dory Funk Jr.
- Debut: October 15, 1992

YouTube information
- Channel: MATTHARDYBRAND
- Years active: 2010–present
- Genre: Entertainment
- Subscribers: 349 thousand
- Views: 46.2 million
- Last updated: February 12, 2026

Signature
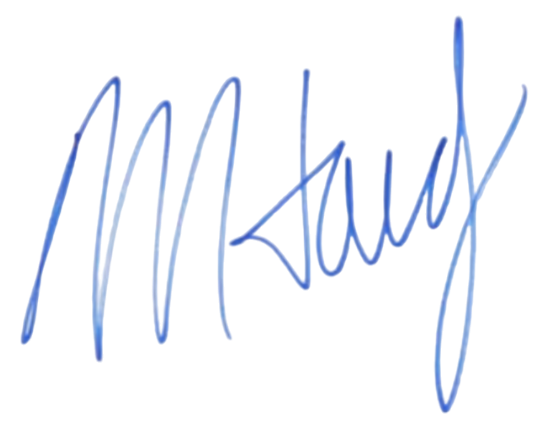

Matthew Moore Hardy (born September 23, 1974) is an American professional wrestler and actor. He is signed to Total Nonstop Action Wrestling (TNA), where he is a former five-time TNA World Tag Team Champion with brother Jeff. He is also known for his tenures with WWE and All Elite Wrestling (AEW).

Hardy gained prominence in the late 1990s and early 2000s as one-half of The Hardy Boyz alongside his brother Jeff Hardy. The duo became one of the most successful and influential tag teams in professional wrestling history. They played a pivotal role in popularizing Tables, Ladders, and Chairs (TLC) matches during the Attitude Era, and were key figures in the resurgence of WWE’s tag team division. Together, they have held a combined 15 world tag team championships.

In addition to his tag team accomplishments, Hardy has enjoyed a successful singles career. In the early 2000s, he debuted the "Version 1" character, which received critical acclaim and was named Best Gimmick by the Wrestling Observer Newsletter in 2003. In 2016, Hardy introduced the "Broken" character during his time in TNA Impact Wrestling, which was similarly praised for its originality and was also awarded Best Gimmick. The character became a cultural phenomenon in wrestling and was later renamed to "Woken" Matt Hardy upon his return to WWE.

Throughout his singles career, Hardy has held the ECW Championship, two TNA World Heavyweight Championships, the United States Championship, Hardcore Championship, European Championship, and Cruiserweight Championship. Across major wrestling organisations, Matt Hardy is a three-time world champion.

Hardy has remained a prominent figure in the wrestling industry across four decades, noted for his adaptability, character work, and creative contributions both in and out of the ring.

== Early life ==
Hardy was born in Cameron, North Carolina, the son of Gilbert and Ruby Moore Hardy. He is the older brother of Jeff Hardy. Their mother died of brain cancer in 1987. Hardy played baseball as a child and throughout high school, but had stopped by his senior year. He also played football, either as a linebacker or a defensive end. Hardy was a good student at Union Pines High School in North Carolina, and was a nominee for the Morehead Scholarship, a scholarship to any university in North Carolina. Hardy attended University of North Carolina at Charlotte, where he majored in engineering; after a year, however, he dropped out due to his father being ill. He then attended Sandhills Community College in Pinehurst to gain his associate degree.

== Professional wrestling career ==
=== Early career (1992–1999) ===
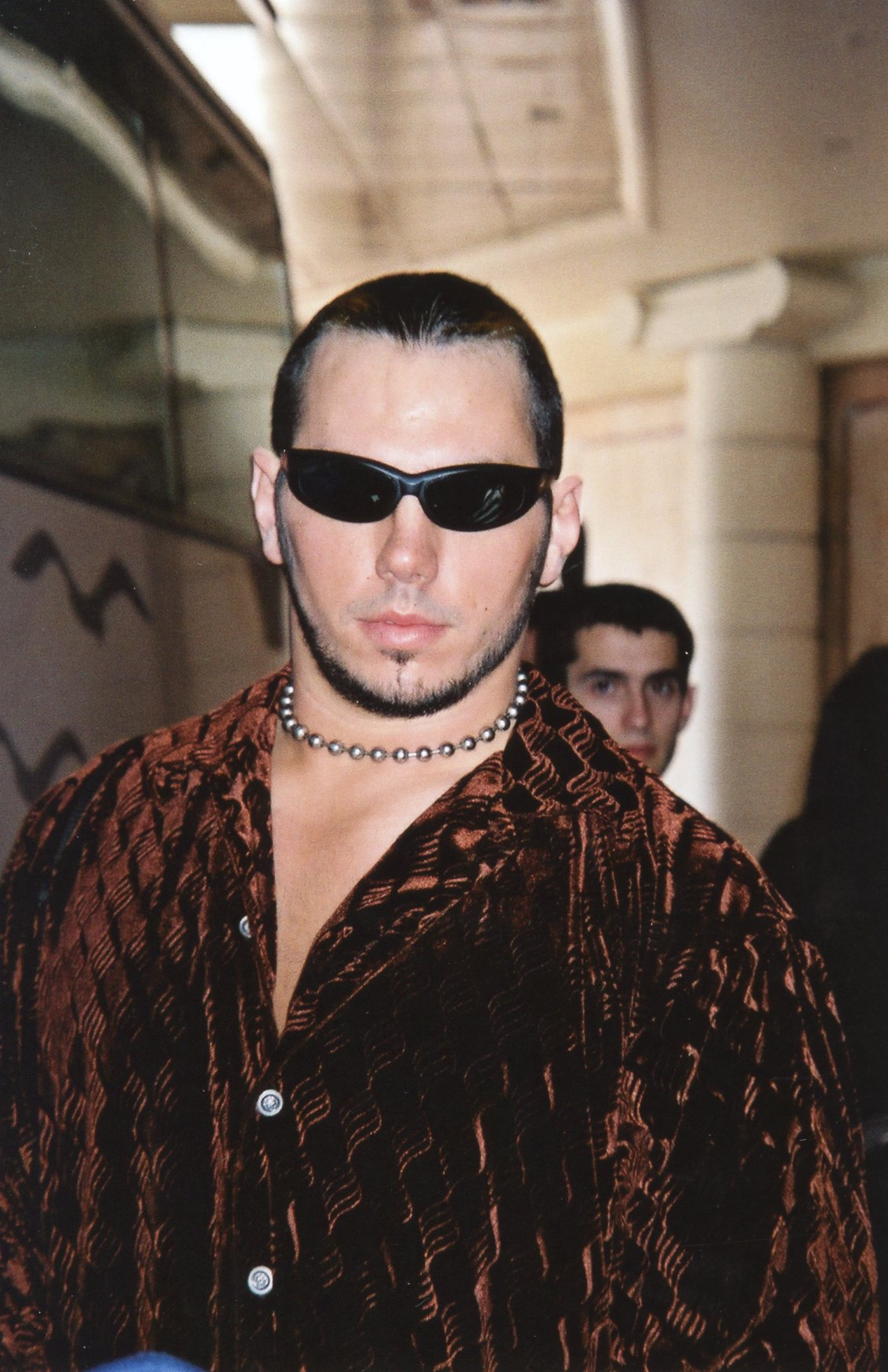
Hardy in 1999

Hardy, along with his brother Jeff and friends, started their own federation, the Trampoline Wrestling Federation (TWF) and mimicked the moves they saw on television. Shortly after Hardy sent in a tape for the World Championship Wrestling (WCW) Amateur Challenge using the ring name High Voltage, a tag team named High Voltage began competing in WCW, causing Hardy to change his name to Surge. A few years later, it was revealed to him by Chris Kanyon that the tape had been kept in the WCW Power Plant, watched multiple times, and that the name High Voltage was blatantly stolen from it. Beginning in 1994, The Hardys wrestled for several North Carolina–based independent circuit promotions and adapted a number of alter-egos. As The Wolverine, Hardy captured the New England Wrestling Alliance (NEWA) Championship in May 1994. As High Voltage, he teamed with Venom to claim the New Frontier Wrestling Association (NFWA) Tag Team Championship in March 1995. A month later, High Voltage defeated the Willow for the NFWA Championship.

In 1997, Matt and Jeff created their own wrestling promotion, The Organization of Modern Extreme Grappling Arts (frequently abbreviated to OMEGA Championship Wrestling, or simply OMEGA), in which Matt competed under the name High Voltage. Both Matt and Jeff took apart the ring and put it back together at every event they had, while Matt sewed all the costumes worn in OMEGA. The promotion folded in October 1999, after both Matt and Jeff signed with the World Wrestling Federation.

=== World Wrestling Federation/Entertainment (1994–2005) ===
==== Early years (1994–1998) ====
Hardy worked as a jobber for the World Wrestling Federation (WWF) from 1994 up until he signed a full-time contract in 1998. His first WWF match was against Nikolai Volkoff on the May 23, 1994, episode of Monday Night Raw, which he lost by submission. A night later at a taping of WWF Wrestling Challenge, he lost a match against Owen Hart. He continued to wrestle sporadically in the WWF throughout 1994 and 1995, losing matches against Crush, Irwin R. Schyster, Razor Ramon, Hakushi, Owen Hart, the imposter Undertaker, Hunter Hearst Helmsley and "The Ringmaster" Steve Austin.

Hardy teamed with Jeff for the first time in the WWF in 1996, losing to teams such as The Smoking Gunns and The Grimm Twins on WWF television. Matt and Jeff had matches with The Headbangers (Thrasher and Mosh) twice, and Kurrgan twice in 1997. It was during this time that Matt and Jeff experimented with different ring names, at one stage being called Ingus (Matt) and Wildo Jinx (Jeff). In Matt's final singles match for the promotion before signing a full-time contract he lost to Val Venis on a taping of Shotgun in May 1998.

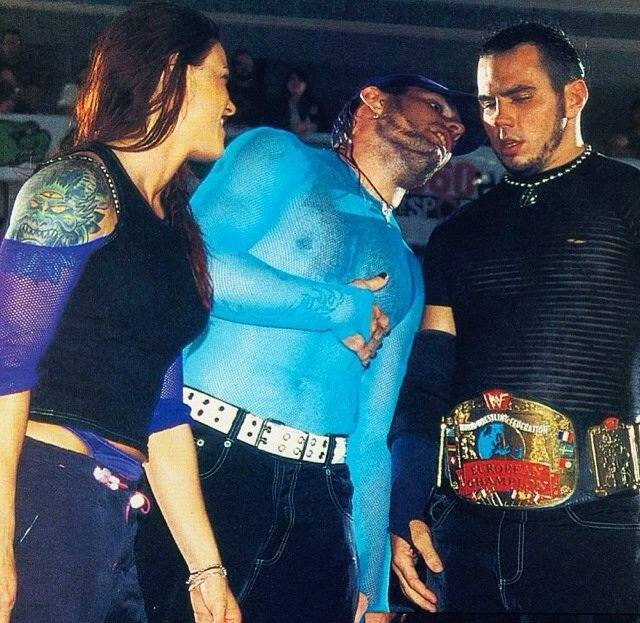
Team Extreme with Matt as European Champion in 2001

==== The Hardy Boyz (1998–2001) ====
It was not until 1998, however, (at the height of The Attitude Era) that the Hardy brothers were given full-time WWF contracts and sent to train with former wrestler Dory Funk Jr. The Hardy Boyz used a cruiserweight, fast-paced high flying style in their matches, often leaping from great heights to do damage to their opponents (and themselves in the process). In 1999, while feuding with Edge and Christian, the duo briefly picked up Michael Hayes as a manager.

At King of the Ring on June 27, The Hardyz defeated Edge and Christian to earn the #1 contendership for the WWF Tag Team Championship. On the July 5 episode of Raw is War, they defeated The Acolytes to win their first Tag Team Championship. They soon dumped Hayes and briefly picked up Gangrel as a manager, after Gangrel turned on Edge and Christian. At No Mercy on October 17, The Hardyz defeated Edge and Christian in the first ever tag team ladder match. At the Royal Rumble on January 23, 2000, The Hardyz defeated The Dudley Boyz in the first ever tag team tables match. They competed against The Dudley Boyz and Edge and Christian for the WWF Tag Team Championship at WrestleMania 2000 on April 2 in the first ever Triangle Ladder match, but were unsuccessful.

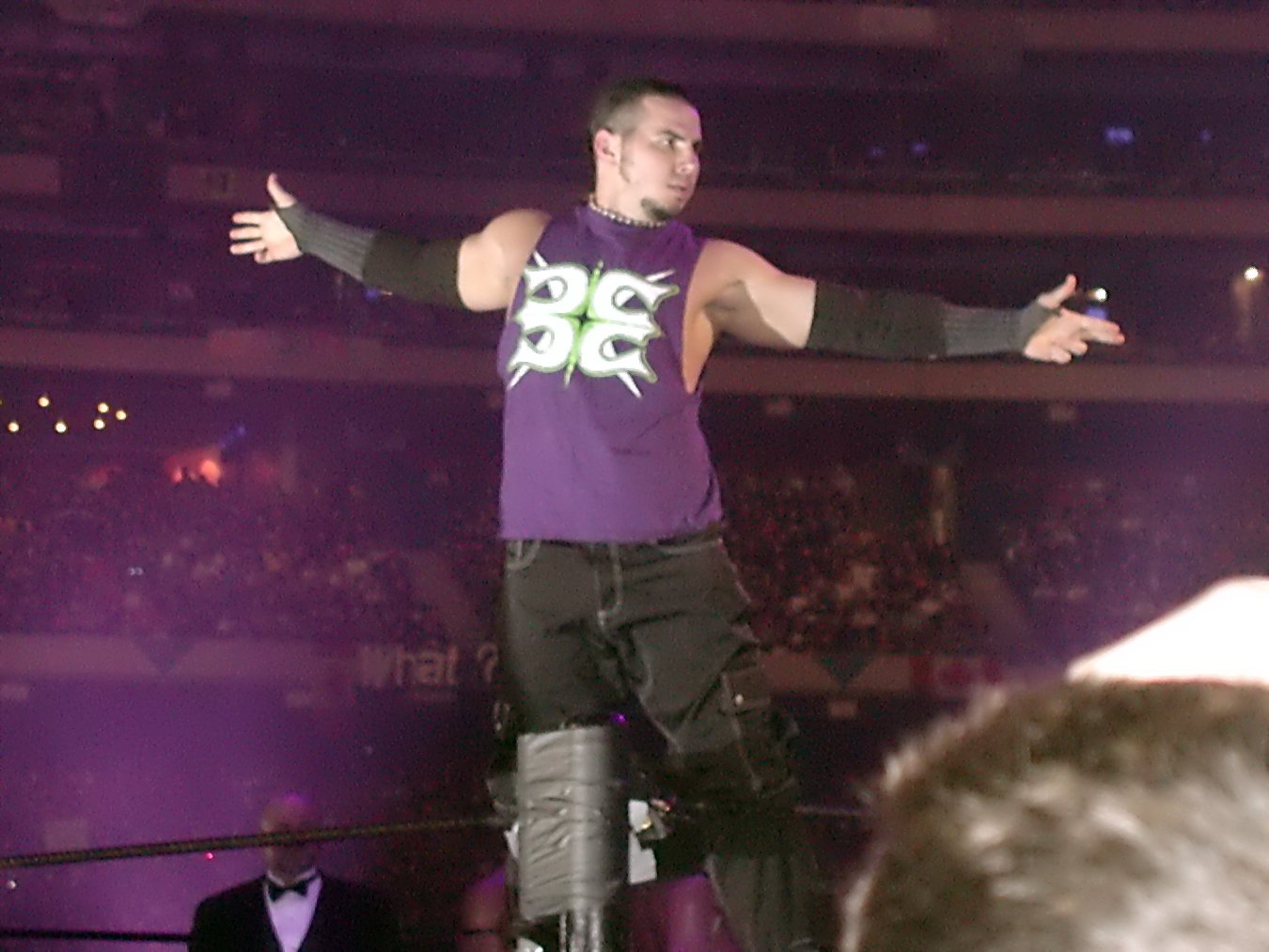
Hardy making his entrance at the WrestleMania X8 as one-half of The Hardy Boyz

Hardy won the Hardcore Championship on the April 24 episode of Raw Is War, by defeating Crash Holly, but lost it back to Holly three days later on SmackDown!, when Holly applied the "24/7 rule" during Hardy's title defense against Jeff. The Hardy Boyz then found a new manager in Matt's real-life girlfriend Lita. Together, the three became known as "Team Xtreme".

At SummerSlam on August 27, The Hardy Boyz competed in the first ever Tables, Ladders, and Chairs match, for the WWF Tag Team Championship against The Dudley Boyz and Edge and Christian, but were unsuccessful. At Unforgiven on September 24, The Hardy Boyz defeated Edge and Christian in a steel cage match to win the tag team championship, and retained it the following night on Raw Is War against Edge and Christian in a ladder match.

In April 2001, The Hardy Boyz began feuding with Stone Cold Steve Austin and Triple H (known as The Power Trip), which also led to a singles push for both Matt and Jeff. Hardy helped Jeff defeat Triple H for the Intercontinental Championship on the April 12 episode of SmackDown!, and shortly after Hardy defeated Eddie Guerrero to win the European Championship on the April 19 episode of SmackDown!. At Backlash on April 29 Hardy retained the title against Guerrero and Christian in a triple threat, and against Edge the following night on Raw is War.

Throughout the year, the Hardy Boyz continued to win as a tag team, winning the WWF Tag Team Titles two more times, and the WCW Tag Team Championship during the Invasion. By the end of the year, the Hardy Boyz began a storyline where they were having trouble co-existing. This culminated in a match between the two, with Lita as the guest referee, at Vengeance on December 9, which Jeff won. Hardy defeated Jeff and Lita the following night on Raw in a two-on-one handicap match.

==== Version 1 gimmick and feud with Kane (2002–2004) ====
At the beginning of 2002, it seemed Team Xtreme had patched things up. After the brand extension (where the Hardy Boyz were drafted to the Raw brand), however, Matt was relegated to Heat while Jeff wrestled on the main show, Raw. On the August 12 episode of Raw, Hardy turned heel by attacking Jeff during Jeff's match against Rob Van Dam, because Hardy was frustrated at not receiving a match against Van Dam for the number one contendership for the Intercontinental Championship. A short time later, Hardy joined the SmackDown! brand, and began dubbing himself "Matt Hardy: Version 1", complete with a "version 1" hand signal. Hardy defeated The Undertaker on the September 12 and October 3 episodes of SmackDown!, due to interference from Brock Lesnar.

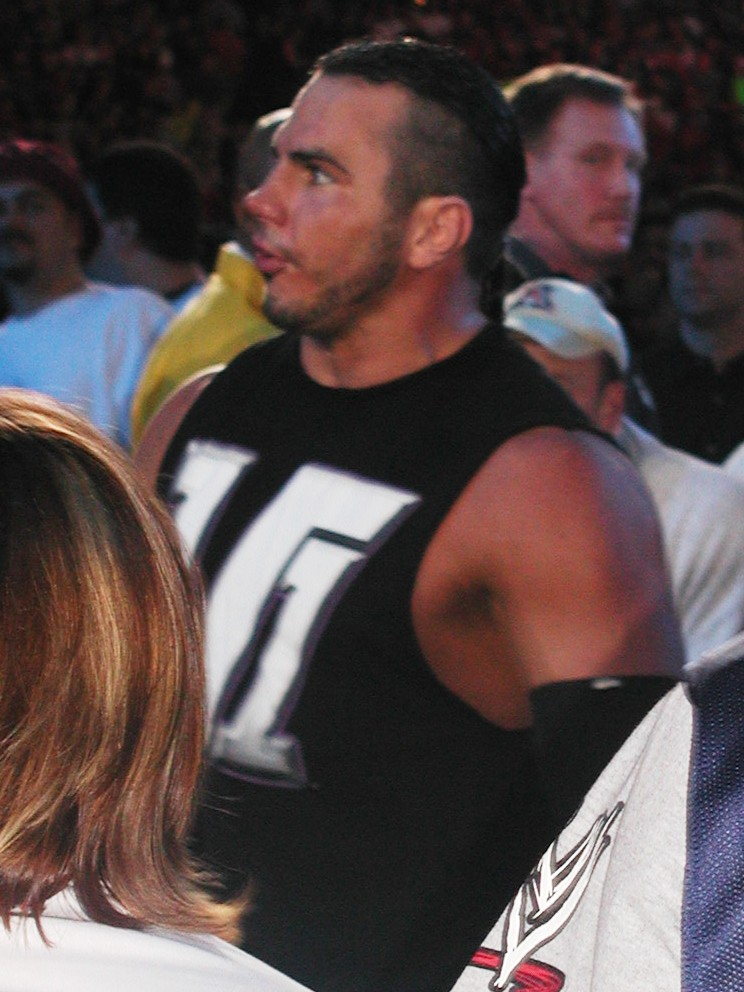
Hardy under his Version 1 gimmick outside of the ring at WrestleMania XIX

Along with his Mattitude Follower Shannon Moore in his corner, 2003 began with Hardy frantically trying to lose weight to get under the 220 lb (100 kg) weight limit to compete for the Cruiserweight Championship. After just barely making weight, Hardy defeated Billy Kidman at No Way Out on February 23 to win the Cruiserweight Championship. At WrestleMania XIX on March 30, he successfully defended it against Rey Mysterio. Hardy lost the Cruiserweight Championship to Mysterio in the main event of the June 5 episode of SmackDown! - the first and only time a Cruiserweight Championship match main evented a show.

After losing the Cruiserweight Championship, Hardy set his sights on the newly reinstated United States Championship, competing in the inaugural tournament for it. He defeated Rikishi in the first round of the tournament but lost to Chris Benoit in the semifinals. He then feuded with Eddie Guerrero who won the championship, but was defeated on the October 2 edition of SmackDown!. The Mattitude faction then expanded to include Crash Holly as Moore's "Moore-on" (apprentice). Hardy and Moore would also challenge Eddie and Chavo Guerrero for the WWE Tag Team Championship, but were unsuccessful. He later disbanded the Mattitude Followers group in November and returned to the Raw brand in order to be able to travel and work with his then girlfriend Lita, who just returned from an injury. On his first night back, he turned on Lita in storyline after teasing a proposal to her. He defeated Christian, who was vying for Lita's affections, on the December 1 episode of Raw.

On the April 19, 2004 episode of Raw, Hardy saved Lita from getting attacked by Kane, turning face in the process. Hardy defeated Kane in a no disqualification match at Vengeance on July 11, but lost a "Till Death To Us Part" match against Kane at SummerSlam on August 15, resulting in Lita being forced to marry Kane. On the August 23 episode of Raw, Hardy was chokeslamed off the stage by Kane during the wedding. Hardy then spent almost a year off from wrestling due to a severe knee injury.

==== Departure and sporadic appearances (2005) ====
Along with his friend Rhyno, Hardy was released by WWE on April 11, 2005. Hardy's release was largely due to unprofessional conduct on social media after discovering that Lita was having a real-life affair with his best friend Edge. The public knowledge of the affair and Hardy's release led to Edge and Lita receiving jeers from the crowds at WWE events, often resulting in chants of "You screwed Matt!", and, "We want Matt!", which meant kayfabe storylines were being affected, considering that Lita was married to Kane at the time in kayfabe. Edge and Lita used the affair and fan backlash to become a hated on-screen couple, which led to Lita turning heel.

Fans began a petition on the internet, wanting WWE to re-sign Hardy, and amassed over 15,000 signatures. Hardy released two character promotional vignettes, that he was planning to use before he was offered a new contract. He called himself The Angelic Diablo with the tagline "the scar will become a symbol" in reference to the way in which he had been treated by Amy and Adam. On the June 20 episode of Raw, during the storyline wedding of Edge and Lita, Hardy's entrance music and video were played when the priest asked if anyone had a reason why Edge and Lita should not be wed.

=== Independent circuit and Ring of Honor (2005) ===
Following his WWE release, Matt returned to the independent circuit and wrestled several matches for the Allied Powers Wrestling Federation (APWF), International Wrestling Cartel (IWC) and Big Time Wrestling (BTW).

Hardy appeared at a scheduled Ring of Honor (ROH) event on July 16, 2005, in Woodbridge, Connecticut, where he defeated Christopher Daniels via submission. Hardy also cut a brief worked shoot promo where he criticized WWE and John Laurinaitis. Following his official return to WWE, Hardy was met with backlash following a match with Homicide from the fans at a subsequent ROH event, which Hardy won. The next day at his final ROH appearance, he lost to Roderick Strong.

=== Return to WWE (2005–2010) ===
==== Return and feud with Edge (2005) ====
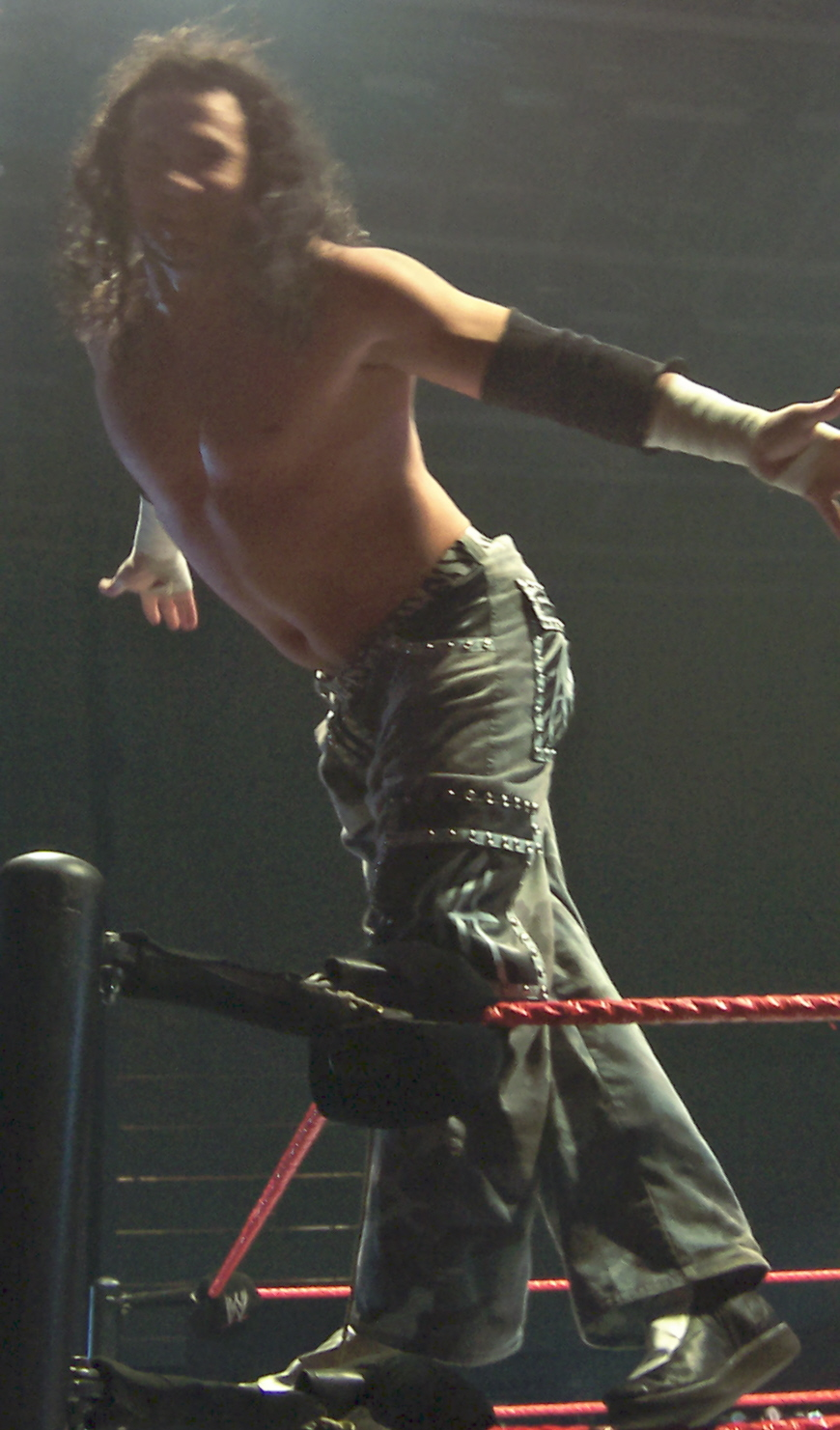
Hardy during a Raw live event held in Bremen, Germany in 2007

On July 11, 2005, on Raw, Hardy attacked Edge backstage and again later during Edge's match with Kane. Before being escorted out of the building by security, Hardy stated that Edge (calling him by his real name of "Adam") and Lita would pay for their actions and told fans that they could see him at Ring of Honor while security officials and event staff were trying to restrain him. Hardy also called out "Johnny Ace" as security had him in handcuffs taking him out of the arena. This caused an uproar amongst fans, who were confused and wondered if the altercation was a work or a shoot. Similar occurrences repeated during the following two weeks.

On the August 1 episode of Raw, Vince McMahon officially announced Hardy's return to WWE, adding that Hardy would face Edge at SummerSlam on August 21. Hardy made his in-ring return, defeating Snitsky on the August 8 Raw. Seconds after the victory, Hardy was attacked by Edge, and as he was being carried backstage, Matt counterattacked Edge in the locker room. At SummerSlam, their match came to a premature end when Edge dropped Hardy onto the top of a ring post, causing him to bleed heavily. The referee ended the match on the grounds that Hardy could not continue, and Edge was declared the winner. After SummerSlam, the two continued their feud, including a Street Fight on the August 29 episode of Raw that resulted in Hardy performing a Side Effect on Edge off the entrance stage and into electrical equipment below; the match ended in a no contest. At Unforgiven on September 18, Edge faced Hardy in a steel cage match. Hardy caught an interfering Lita with the Twist of Fate and won the match with a leg drop off the top of the cage. Hardy and Edge faced each other on October 3 at WWE Raw Homecoming in a Loser Leaves Raw ladder match. Edge's briefcase holding his Money in the Bank contract for his WWE Championship opportunity was suspended above the ring. The winner of the match received the contract and the loser was forced to leave Raw. Edge tied Hardy's arms in the ropes, and Lita trapped Hardy in a crucifix hold, leaving Hardy only able to watch Edge win.

==== Move to SmackDown (2005–2006) ====
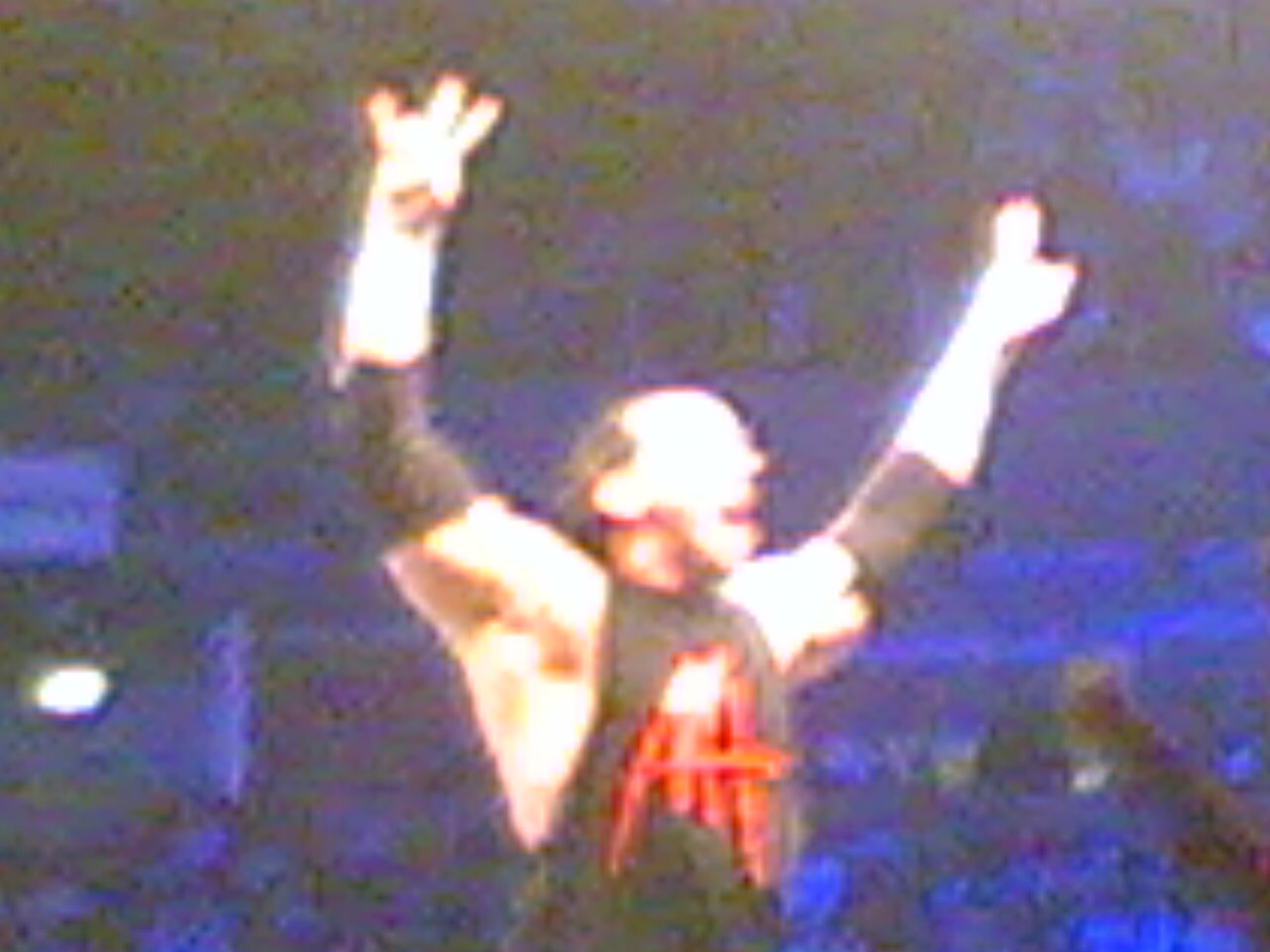
Hardy during WWE's Eddie Guerrero tribute tour in 2005

With his defeat at the hands of Edge, Hardy was moved to the SmackDown! brand where he re-debuted with a win over Simon Dean on the October 21 episode of SmackDown!. One week later, Hardy won the fan vote to represent Team SmackDown! (alongside Rey Mysterio) to challenge Team Raw (Edge and Chris Masters) at Taboo Tuesday on November 1. Edge, however, refused to wrestle and sent Snitsky in place of him in the match, which Hardy and Mysterio won.

Back on SmackDown! in 2006, Hardy started an angle with MNM (Johnny Nitro and Joey Mercury) and their manager Melina when Melina approached Hardy, seemingly wanting Hardy to join with her team. Hardy refused the offer, which led to him facing the tag team on several occasions with a variety of partners. On July 25, after the SmackDown! taping, Hardy was taken out of action after doctors found the remnants of the staph infection that had plagued him the previous year. He was sidelined until August 25 while he healed.

Upon his return to action, Hardy feuded against childhood friend and reigning Cruiserweight Champion Gregory Helms. At No Mercy on October 8, in their home state, Hardy beat Helms in a non-title match. The two met again at Survivor Series on November 26, where Hardy's team won in a clean sweep. They wrestled one final match, a one time appearance in Booker T's Pro Wrestling Alliance (PWA) promotion, where Hardy defeated Helms in a North Carolina Street Fight.

==== The Hardy Boyz reunion (2006–2007) ====
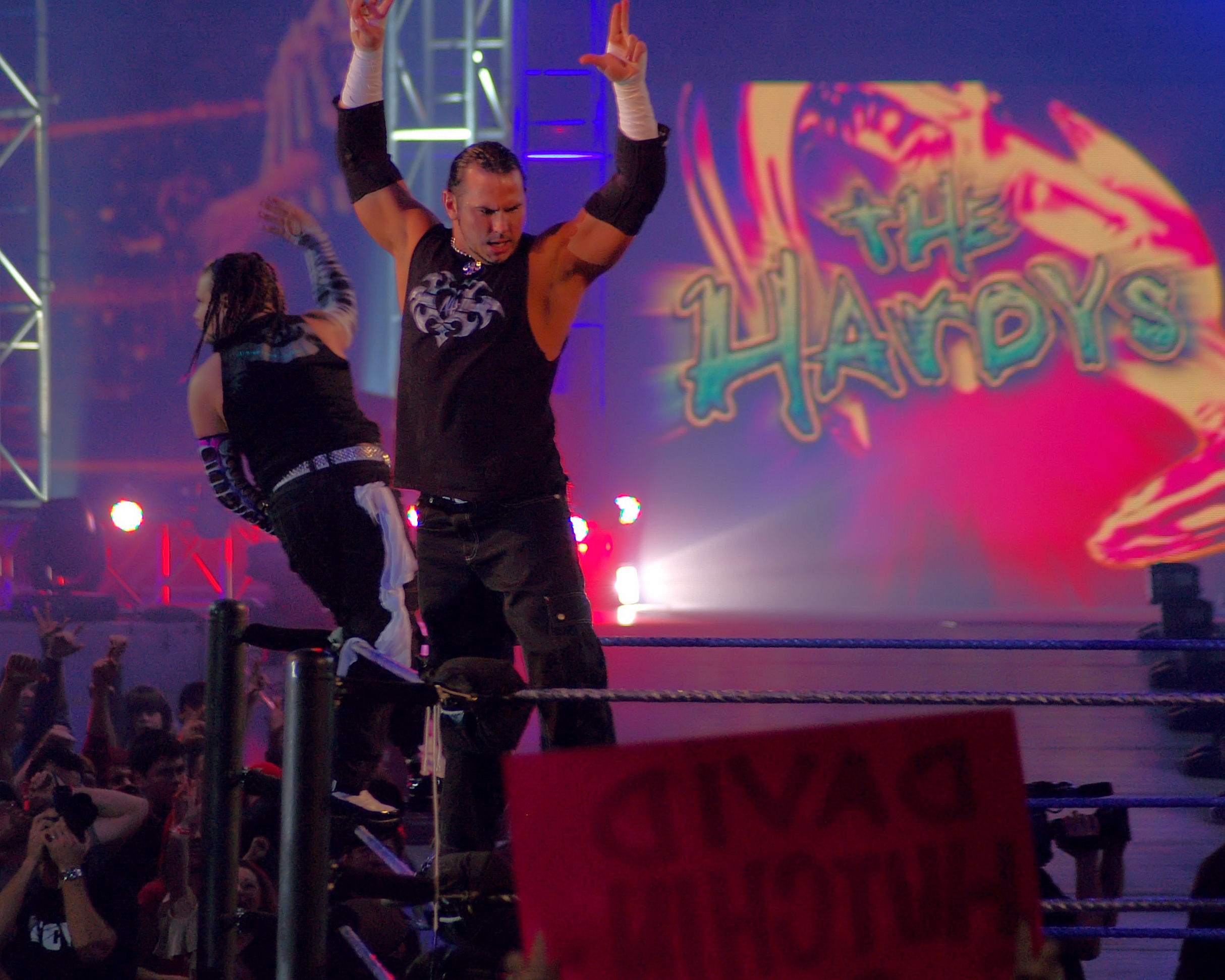
Jeff (far left) and Matt (front) making their entrances at December to Dismember in 2006

On the November 21 episode of ECW on Sci Fi, Hardy and Jeff competed in a match together, defeating The Full Blooded Italians. At December to Dismember on December 3, the Hardy Boyz issued an open challenge to any tag team who wanted to face them. MNM answered their challenge by reuniting at December to Dismember, a match won by the Hardy Boyz. At Armageddon on December 17, Hardy and Jeff competed against Paul London and Brian Kendrick, MNM, and Dave Taylor and William Regal in a Ladder match for the WWE Tag Team Championship but lost. Subsequently, he and Jeff feuded with MNM after the legitimate incident where they injured Mercury's face at Armageddon. This led to a long term rivalry, and at the Royal Rumble on January 28, 2007, Hardy and Jeff defeated MNM. Mercury and Hardy continued to feud on SmackDown! until Mercury was released from WWE on March 26.

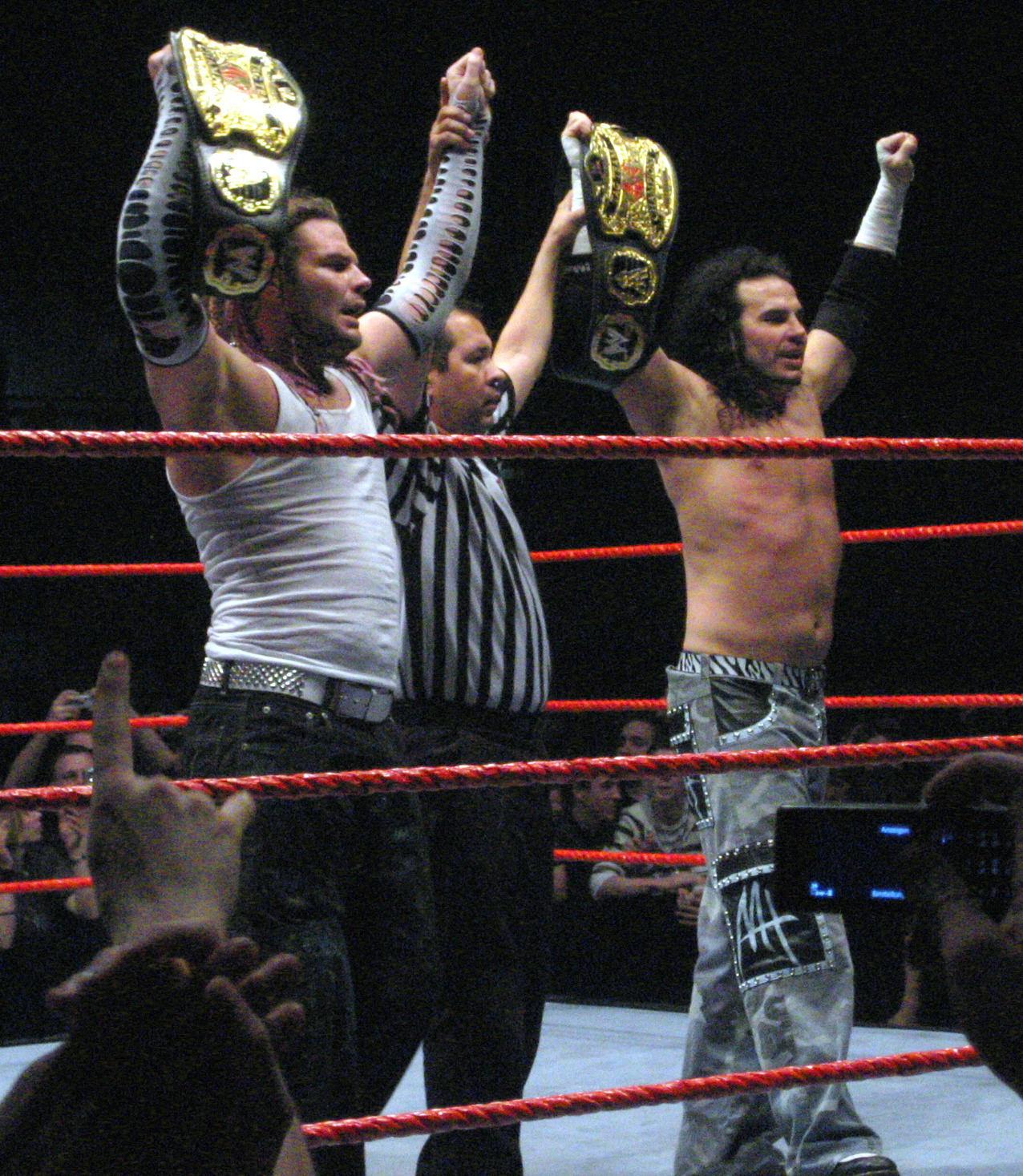
Jeff (left) and Matt (right) with the Tag Team Championships in 2007

On the April 2 episode of Raw, the Hardys competed in a 10-team battle royal for the World Tag Team Championship. They won the titles for the sixth time from then WWE Champion John Cena and Shawn Michaels after last eliminating Lance Cade and Trevor Murdoch. This started a feud with Cade and Murdoch, and the Hardys successfully retained their World Tag Team Championship in their first title defense at Backlash on April 29. The Hardy Boyz also retained their titles at Judgment Day on May 20 against Cade and Murdoch. One month later at One Night Stand on June 3, they defeated The World's Greatest Tag Team to retain the titles in a Ladder match. The following night on Raw, Vince McMahon demanded that The Hardys once again defend their championships against Cade and Murdoch. The Hardys were defeated after Murdoch pushed Jeff's foot off the bottom rope during Cade's pinfall, causing the three count to continue. They invoked their rematch clause against Cade and Murdoch at Vengeance: Night of Champions on June 24, but were unsuccessful.

==== Feud with MVP and championship reigns (2007–2009) ====
On the July 6 episode of SmackDown!, Hardy won a non-title match against United States Champion Montel Vontavious Porter (MVP), which resulted in a feud between the two. Hardy was defeated by MVP at The Great American Bash on July 22 for the United States Championship. MVP then claimed that he was "better than Hardy at everything", which led to a series of contests between Hardy and MVP, such as a basketball game, an arm wrestling contest, and a chess match which MVP "sneezed" on and ruined when Hardy put him in check. MVP challenged Hardy to a boxing match on the August 18 episode of Saturday Night's Main Event, however MVP was legitimately diagnosed with the heart condition Wolff-Parkinson-White syndrome. Since MVP was unable to compete, Hardy faced his replacement, former world champion boxer, Evander Holyfield. The match ended in a no contest after MVP entered the ring to verbally abuse Holyfield, who then knocked him out. MVP also challenged Hardy to a beer drinking contest at SummerSlam on August 26, but as revenge for what happened on Saturday Night's Main Event, Hardy allowed Stone Cold Steve Austin to replace him; Austin simply performed a stunner on MVP then kept drinking.

After a segment involving MVP inadvertently choosing Hardy as his tag-team partner, Theodore Long promptly set up a match against Deuce 'n Domino for the WWE Tag Team Championship on the August 31 episode of SmackDown! which Hardy and MVP were able to win, therefore setting up Hardy's first reign as WWE Tag Team Champion. Hardy and MVP retained the titles at Unforgiven on September 16 in a rematch against former champions Deuce 'n Domino. Hardy was scheduled to face MVP at Cyber Sunday on October 28, but due to a real-life head injury sustained on the October 26 episode of SmackDown!, he was not medically cleared to compete. As part of the storyline, Hardy continually asked MVP for a shot at the United States Championship but MVP refused stating that he was more focused on the WWE Tag Team Championship.

On the November 16 episode of SmackDown!, Hardy and MVP dropped the WWE Tag Team Championship to John Morrison and The Miz. Despite the fact that Hardy was hurt, MVP immediately invoked the rematch clause. After the rematch, in which Hardy was forced to tap out, MVP attacked Hardy, repeatedly targeting his knee. It was later confirmed by WWE.com that Hardy had suffered an injury at MVP's hands and that he might not be able to compete at Survivor Series on November 18. Despite Hardy's absence at Survivor Series, his team was able to win the match. On November 21, WWE's official website reported that Hardy underwent an emergency appendectomy in Tampa, Florida, after his appendix burst. Hardy made an appearance at the December 31 episode of Raw supporting his brother Jeff. To further Jeff's storyline with Randy Orton, however, Hardy was attacked by Orton. Hardy made his return at a live event in Muncie, Indiana, on March 1, 2008.

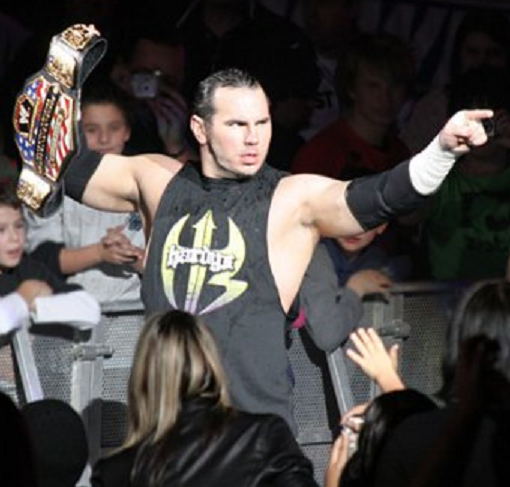
Hardy as United States Champion in 2008

On March 30 at WrestleMania XXIV, during the Money in the Bank ladder match Hardy cut through the crowd and attacked MVP to prevent him from winning the match. He made his official in-ring return the next night on Raw, losing a singles match to WWE Champion Randy Orton. On the April 4 episode of SmackDown, Hardy faced MVP in a non-title match, which he won, re-igniting their storyline rivalry. Hardy defeated MVP to win the United States Championship at Backlash on April 27, and retained his title against MVP five days later on SmackDown.

Hardy declared himself as a fighting champion that would take on all challenges, defending the United States championship against Shelton Benjamin, Elijah Burke, Chuck Palumbo, Mr. Kennedy, Chavo Guerrero and Umaga. Hardy was drafted to the ECW brand on the June 23, 2008, episode of Raw during the 2008 WWE Draft, in the process making the United States Championship exclusive to ECW. He lost the United States Championship to Shelton Benjamin at the Great American Bash pay-per-view on July 20, which meant that the title returned to SmackDown.

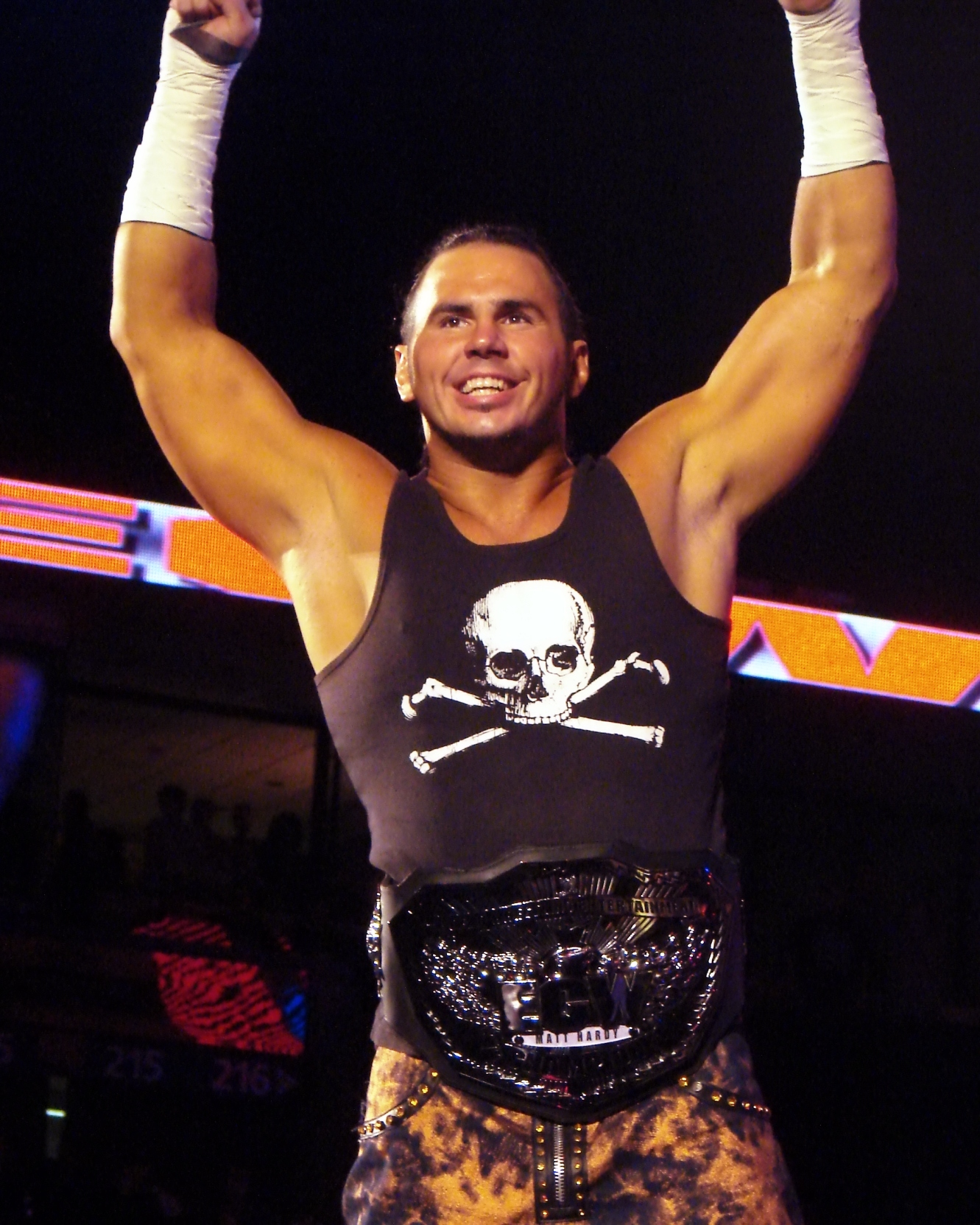
Hardy as ECW Champion in 2008

On the July 22 episode of ECW, Hardy became the number one contender to Mark Henry's ECW Championship after defeating John Morrison, The Miz and Finlay in a fatal four-way match. He won the title match at SummerSlam on August 17 by disqualification due to interference from Henry's manager, Tony Atlas, thus he failed to win the title. Due to the ending of the SummerSlam match, Hardy received a rematch for the title on the next episode of ECW, but again failed to win the title when Henry pinned him after a distraction by Atlas. At Unforgiven on September 7, Hardy won the ECW Championship during the Championship scramble match, defeating then-champion Henry, The Miz, Finlay and Chavo Guerrero Jr. by pinning the Miz with three minutes left, marking his first world heavyweight championship win. He continued to feud with Henry until No Mercy on October 5, where Hardy retained the title. Hardy lost the title to Jack Swagger on the January 13, 2009, episode of ECW, which was taped on January 12.

==== Feud with Jeff Hardy and departure (2009–2010) ====
At the Royal Rumble pay-per-view on January 25, after losing an ECW Championship rematch to Swagger, Hardy turned on his brother when he hit Jeff with a steel chair, allowing Edge to win the WWE Championship, turning heel for the first time since 2004. On the January 27 episode of ECW, it was announced by General Manager Theodore Long that Hardy had requested, and been granted, his release from ECW and had re-signed with the SmackDown brand. As part of the buildup to this feud, Matt strongly implied that he was responsible for all of Jeff's accidents leading back to November, including an assault in a hotel stairwell that prevented Jeff from appearing at Survivor Series, an automobile accident where Jeff's car was run off the road, and a pyrotechnics malfunction where part of the pyro from Jeff's entrance was fired directly at Jeff, in an attempt to stop Jeff holding the WWE Championship. Despite Hardy's attempts to goad Jeff into fighting him, Jeff refused to fight his brother, but, on the March 6 episode of SmackDown, Jeff attacked him during a promo where Matt implied that he was also responsible for the fire that burned down Jeff's house, going so far as to reveal that he had in his possession a dog collar that supposedly belonged to Jeff's dog, Jack (who died in the fire), that he claimed to have salvaged from the wreckage of the house. At WrestleMania 25 on April 5, Matt defeated Jeff in an Extreme Rules match, and in a stretcher match on the following episode of SmackDown.

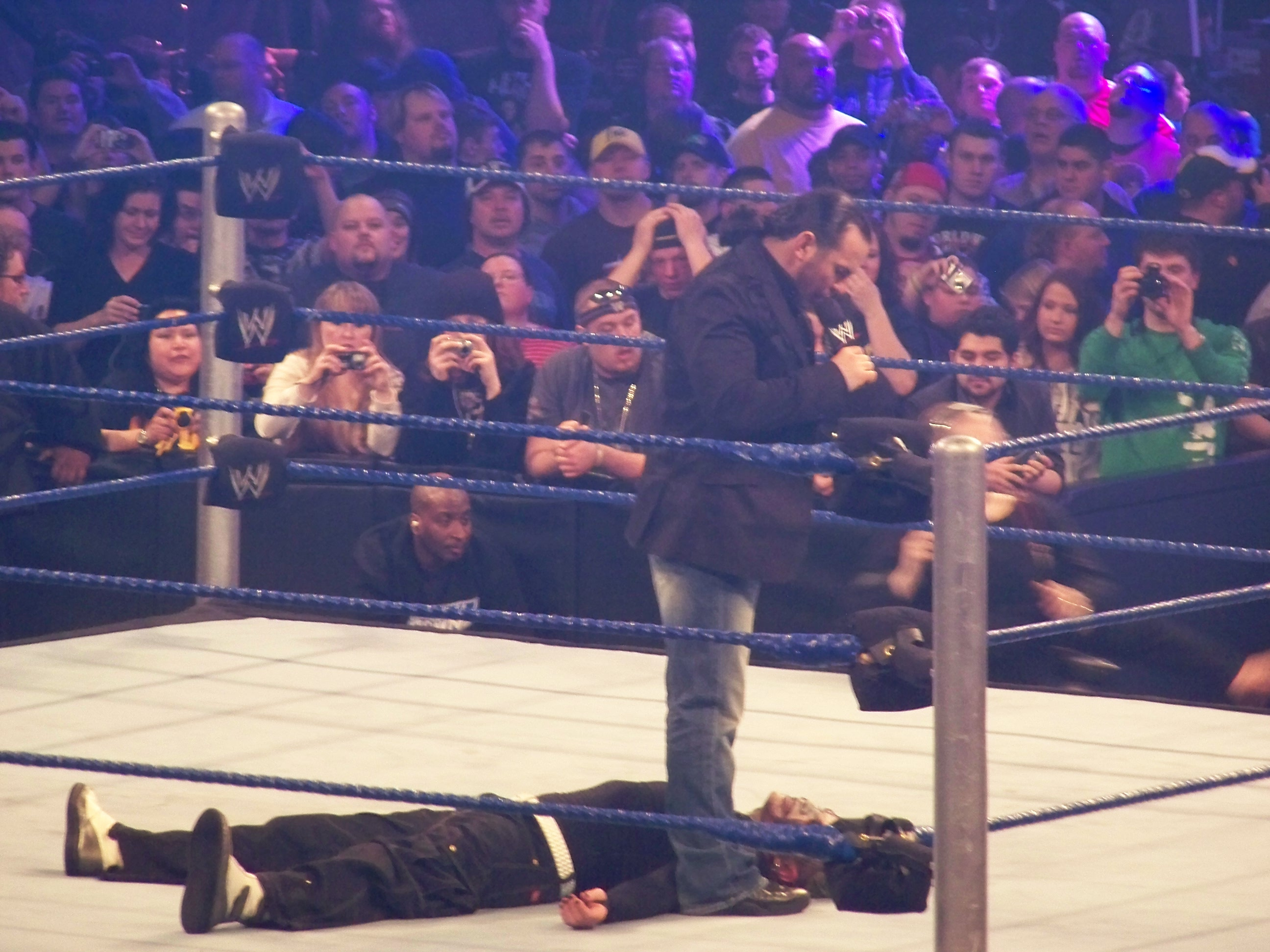
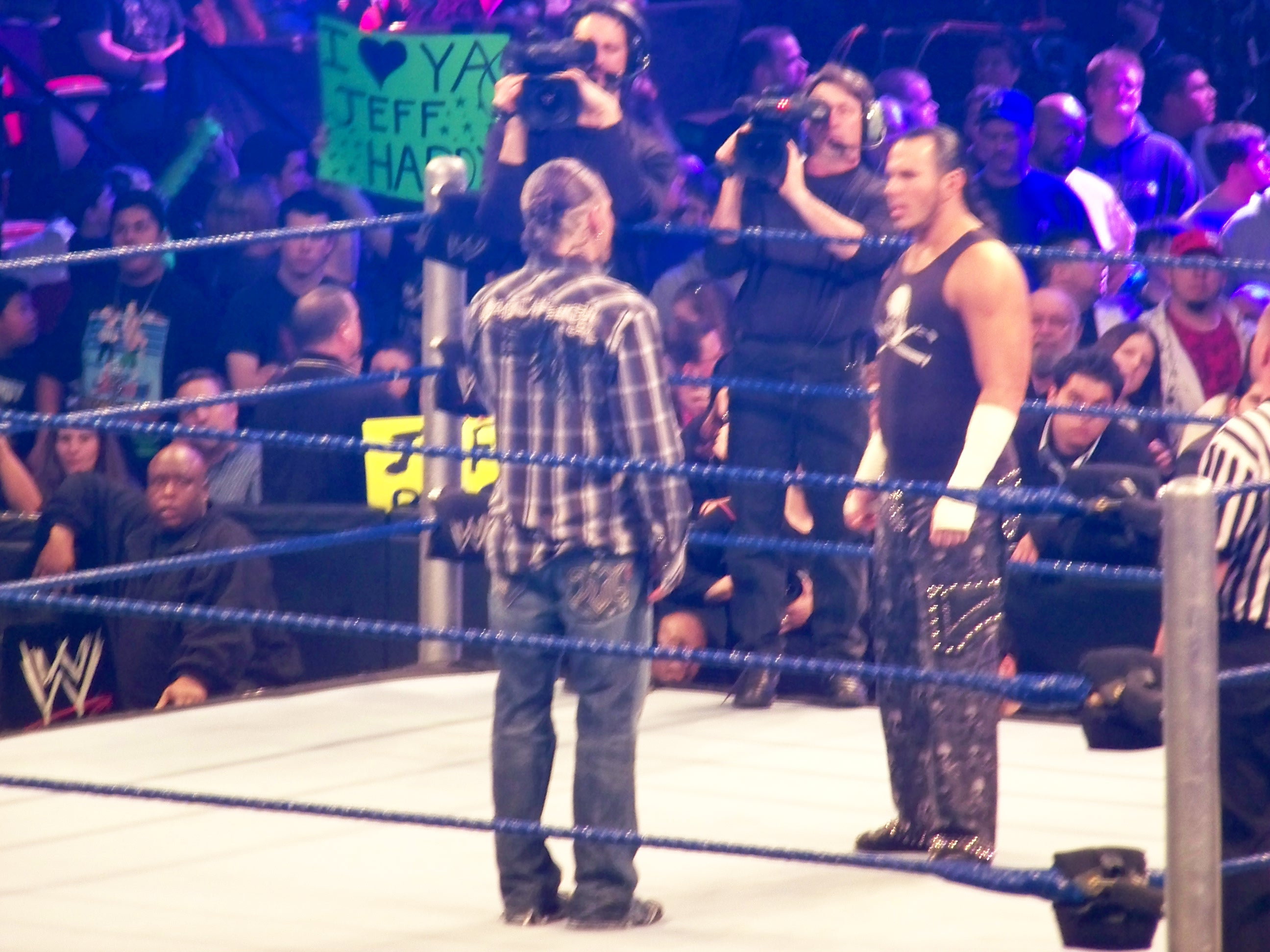
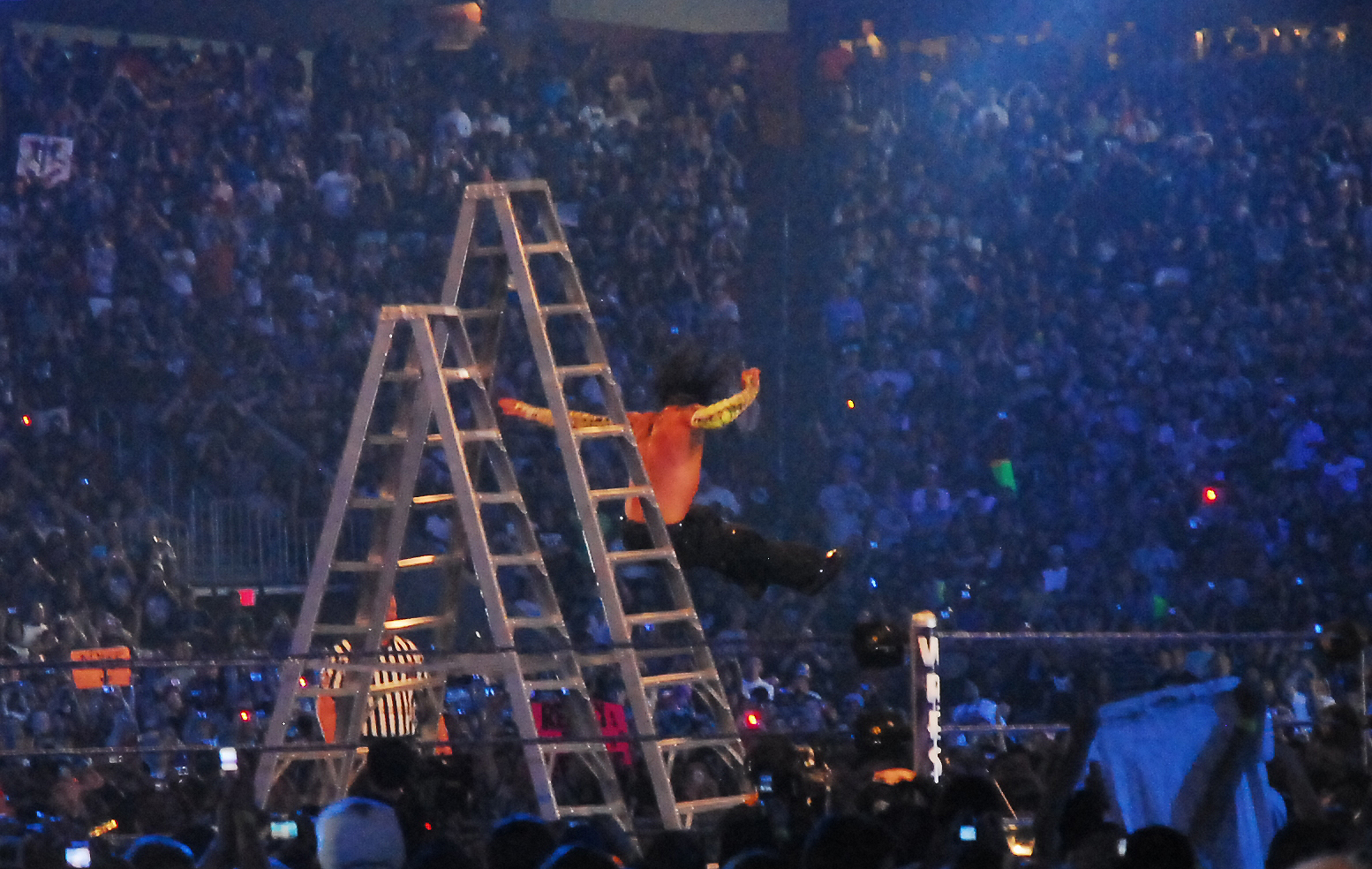
Matt and Jeff began their rivalry at the 2009 Royal Rumble and it culminated with a match at WrestleMania 25

On the April 13 episode of Raw, Hardy was drafted to the Raw brand as part of the WWE draft. Despite the fact that the two were on different brands, he continued his feud with Jeff. Two weeks later, in a rematch from WrestleMania, Hardy lost to Jeff in an "I Quit" match at Backlash on April 26, in which he legitimately broke his hand.

Hardy continued to wrestle with his hand in a cast, incorporating it into his persona and claiming that he was wrestling under protest. He reignited his feud with MVP on Raw for the United States Championship. He also formed a tag team with William Regal, and the two acted as henchmen for General Manager Vickie Guerrero. At the June 22 taping of WWE Superstars, Hardy suffered yet another injury, when his intestines went through his abdominal wall, during a triple threat match against MVP and Kofi Kingston. Hardy had suffered a tear in his abdominal muscle two years previously, but had not needed surgery until it worsened, and became a danger to his health.

He was then traded back to the SmackDown brand on June 29, and underwent surgery for the torn abdominal muscle on July 2. He made his return on the August 7 episode of SmackDown as the special guest referee in the World Heavyweight Championship match between his brother, Jeff, and CM Punk, and helped Jeff retain the championship by counting the pinfall. The following week Hardy turned face again when he saved Jeff when CM Punk and The Hart Dynasty attacked both Jeff and John Morrison. On the August 21 episode of SmackDown, after apologizing for his past actions towards Jeff and admitting that he was not behind any of Jeff's accidents, he had his first match back after his injury when he teamed with Jeff and John Morrison to defeat The Hart Dynasty and CM Punk, when Matt pinned Punk.

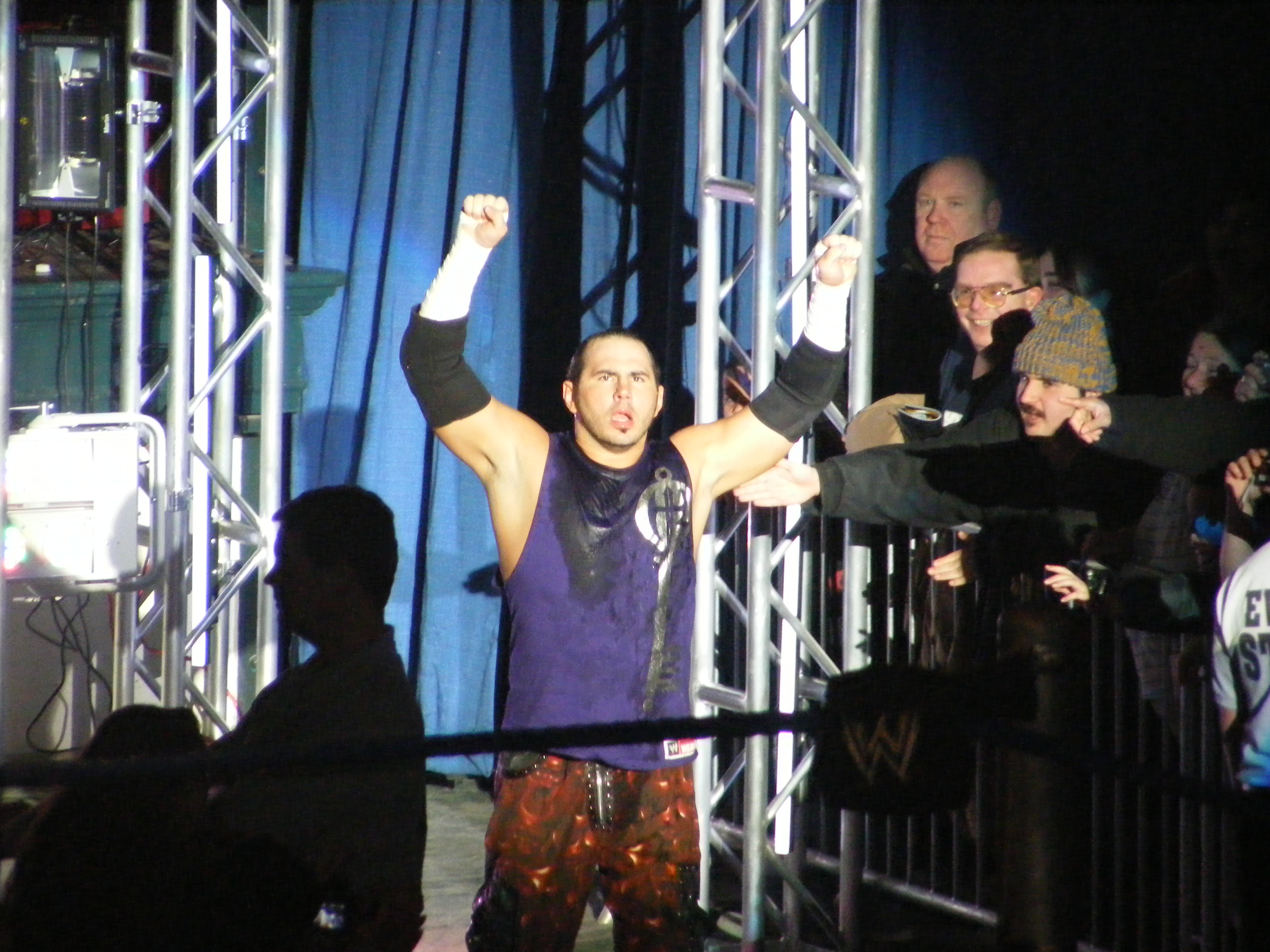
Hardy making his entrance at a SmackDown live event in 2009

In early 2010, Hardy began an on-screen relationship with Maria; but was brief and the relationship ended when Maria was released from her WWE contract. On the March 5 episode of SmackDown, Hardy qualified for the Money in the Bank ladder match at WrestleMania XXVI on March 28 by defeating Drew McIntyre, but was unsuccessful at WrestleMania, as the match was won by Jack Swagger. Hardy was suspended by Vince McMahon because he attacked McIntyre after McIntyre lost to Kofi Kingston at Over the Limit on May 23. He was able to get his revenge on McIntyre during the Viewer's Choice episode of Raw when chosen as the opponent for McIntyre, with General Manager Theodore Long stating that Hardy was suspended from SmackDown, but not from Raw. On the following episode of SmackDown, however, Vickie Guerrero announced that, per orders of Vince McMahon, Hardy had been suspended from all WWE programming. However, at Fatal 4-Way on June 20, Hardy prevented McIntyre from regaining the Intercontinental Championship, thus continuing their feud. On the following edition of SmackDown, he was reinstated by Long and had a match with McIntyre, which Hardy won. After the match, it was announced that McIntyre's visa had legitimately expired and was sent back to Scotland, thus ending their feud. Hardy was featured in the SmackDown Money in the Bank ladder match at Money in the Bank on July 18 but was unsuccessful in winning with Kane coming out victorious.

On the September 10 episode of SmackDown, he lost his last televised match against then-newcomer Alberto Del Rio and was saved by Christian (who was feuding with Del Rio) after the match. Two days later on September 12, WWE confirmed they had sent Hardy home from a European tour. Following this, Hardy began posting videos on his YouTube channel expressing his disinterest in the WWE product and insisting that he wanted to be released from the company. On October 15, WWE announced that Hardy had been released from his contract. Hardy later stated that his release had been in effect two weeks before WWE made the announcement.

=== Total Nonstop Action Wrestling (2011) ===
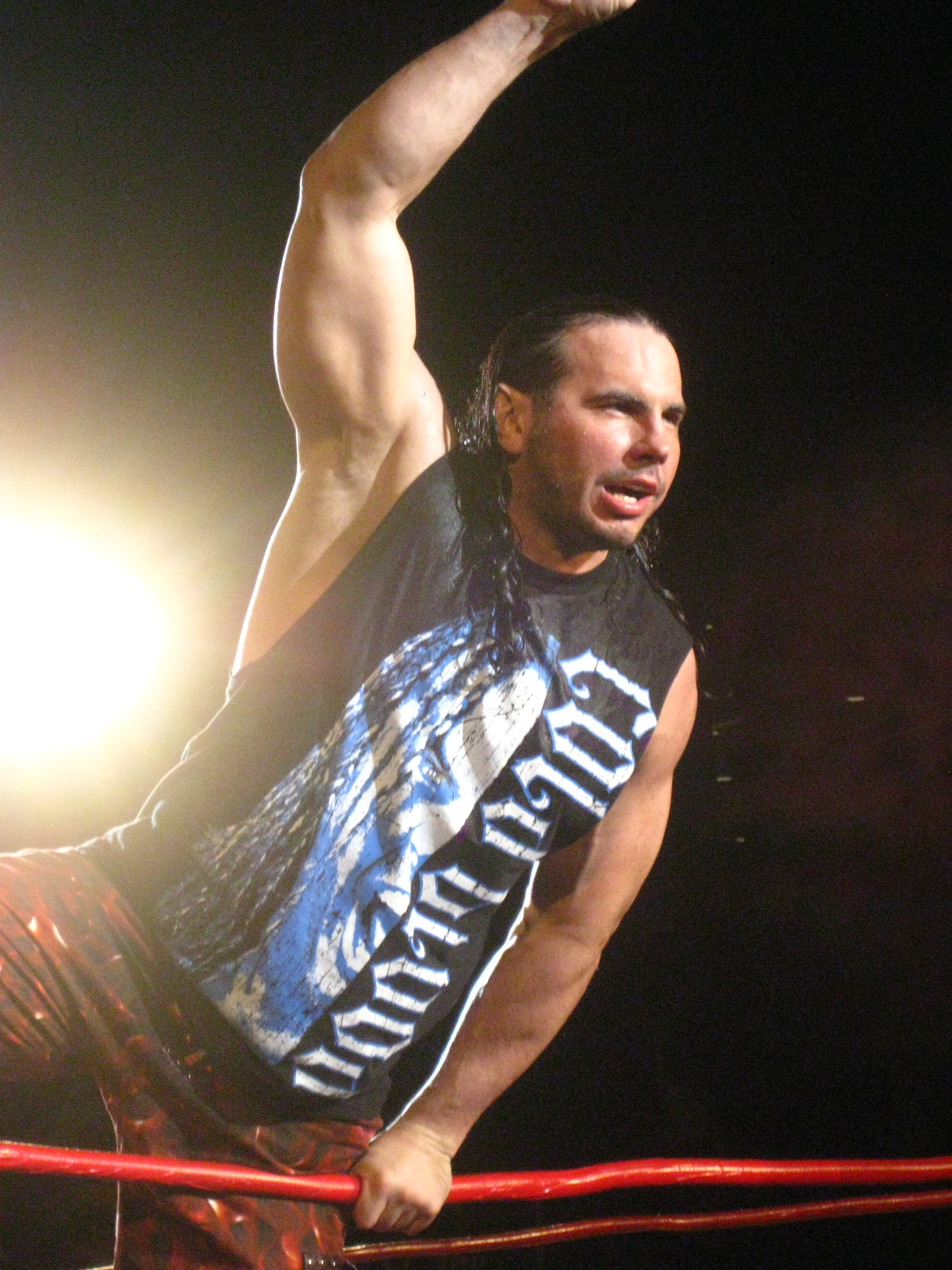
Hardy at a TNA live event in 2011

On January 9, 2011, Hardy made his debut for Total Nonstop Action Wrestling (TNA) at the Genesis pay-per-view, as part of the stable Immortal. He was the surprise opponent for Rob Van Dam, and defeated him to prevent Van Dam from receiving a match for the TNA World Heavyweight Championship, held by Hardy's brother Jeff. In the main event, Hardy attempted to interfere in Jeff's World Heavyweight Championship match with Mr. Anderson, but was stopped by Van Dam, which led to Jeff losing both the match and the championship. On the January 13 episode of Impact!, the Hardy Boyz reunited to defeat Anderson and Van Dam in a tag team match, following interference from Beer Money, Inc. On February 13 at Against All Odds, Van Dam defeated Hardy in a rematch.

On the following episode of Impact!, Hardy, along with the rest of Immortal and Ric Flair, betrayed Fortune. On March 13 at Victory Road, Hardy was defeated by Flair's previous protégé, A.J. Styles. On April 17 at Lockdown, Immortal, represented by Hardy, Abyss, Bully Ray and Ric Flair, were defeated by Fortune members James Storm, Kazarian and Robert Roode and Christopher Daniels, who replaced an injured A.J. Styles, in a Lethal Lockdown match. On the April 21 episode of Impact!, Hardy faced Sting for the TNA World Heavyweight Championship, Hardy's first World Title match in TNA, but was defeated. The following month, Hardy was granted a shot at the TNA World Tag Team Championship against Beer Money, Inc. (James Storm and Robert Roode). While the champions looked to defend the title against the Hardy Boyz, Matt instead introduced the returning Chris Harris, Storm's old tag team partner, as his partner for the title match. The match took place at Sacrifice, where Storm and Roode retained their titles.

On June 21, it was reported that TNA had suspended Hardy. On August 20, Hardy was released from TNA following a DUI arrest that occurred earlier that same day.

=== Return to the independent circuit (2011–2017) ===
Hardy announced his retirement from full-time professional wrestling due to injuries on September 1, 2011. He issued a challenge to his long-time rival MVP, who was wrestling in Japan at the time, to one final match at "Crossfire Live!" in Nashville. The event was held May 19, 2012, and benefited the Make-A-Wish Foundation. Hardy won the match.

Throughout 2012, Hardy wrestled sporadically on the independent circuit, working with promotions such as Mid Atlantic Championship Wrestling, Pro Wrestling Syndicate and Northeast Wrestling. On October 5, Hardy was defeated by Kevin Steen at Pro Wrestling Xperience's An Evil Twist of Fate. On November 11, Hardy, as the masked wrestler Rahway Reaper, defeated the Pro Wrestling Syndicate Kevin Matthews, winning the championship. On February 9, 2013, Hardy lost the Pro Wrestling Syndicate Championship back to Matthews.

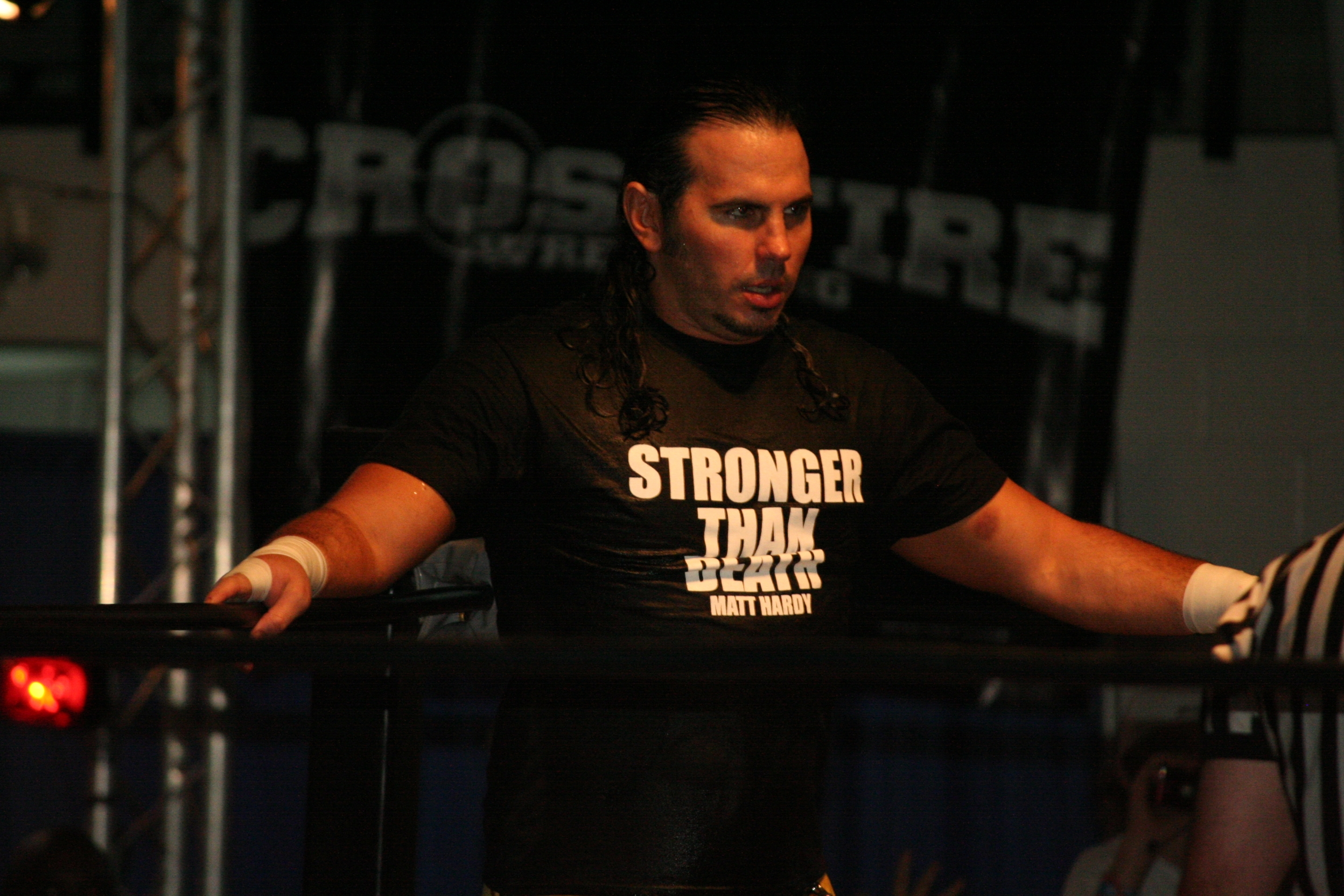
Hardy preparing to face MVP at a Crossfire independent show in 2012

On February 16, 2013, at Family Wrestling Entertainment's No Limit, Hardy wrestled a TLC match for the FWE Heavyweight Championship against the champion Carlito and Tommy Dreamer, but he was defeated. On November 30, 2013, at WrestleCade, Hardy defeated Carlito to become the first ever WrestleCade Champion.

On May 3, 2014, following a match between Christian York and Drolix, Hardy defeated Drolix to become the new MCW Heavyweight Champion. At Maryland Championship Wrestling's Shane Shamrock Cup, Hardy defeated Luke Hawx in a TLC match for Hardy's title and Hawx's Extreme Rising World title. Hardy won the match, but he gave back the title to Hawx. On October 4, Hardy lost the MCW Heavyweight Championship back to Drolix, following outside interference from Kevin Eck.

On February 9, 2015, Hardy appeared on FWE's "No Limits 2015" iPPV, challenging Drew Galloway for the ICW World Heavyweight Championship, but was defeated. It was this ICW title match which saw the Scottish championship renamed as the ICW's "World Heavyweight Championship" due to being the first defense outside of continent of Europe.

On November 28, 2015, Hardy lost the WrestleCade Championship to Jeff Jarrett at WrestleCade IV in Winston-Salem, North Carolina. Hardy regained the title in a triple-threat cage match against Jarrett and Ethan Carter III in Hickory, North Carolina on May 20, 2016. He appeared at the #DELETEWCPW event for What Culture Pro Wrestling (WCPW) in Nottingham, England on November 30. Hardy, billed as "Broken" Matt Hardy, lost a no-disqualification match to Bully Ray, with Ray proposing the no-disqualification stipulation at the last minute, and Hardy accepting there and then. On March 12, 2016, Hardy challenged Drew Galloway for the WCPW World Heavyweight Championship at a British Championship Wrestling event in a match taped for an episode of WCPW ReLoaded.

=== Return to ROH (2012–2014) ===
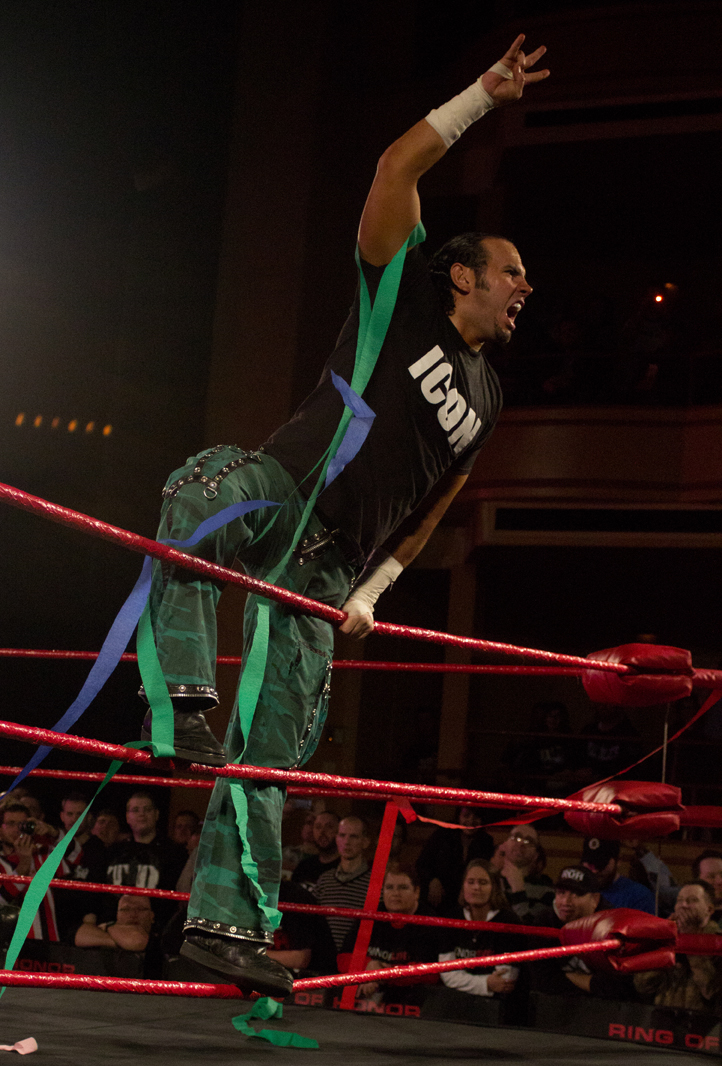
Hardy at a Ring of Honor television taping in 2013

At Death Before Dishonor X: State of Emergency in 2012, Hardy returned to Ring of Honor, confronting Adam Cole and challenging him to a match for the ROH World Television Championship. On December 16 at Final Battle 2012: Doomsday, Hardy defeated Cole in a non-title match.

At the following iPPV, 11th Anniversary Show on March 2, 2013, Hardy joined the villainous S.C.U.M. stable. On April 5 at the Supercard of Honor VII iPPV, Hardy unsuccessfully challenged Matt Taven for the ROH World Television Championship in a three-way elimination match, which also included Adam Cole. On June 22 at Best in the World 2013, Hardy defeated former S.C.U.M. stablemate Kevin Steen in a No Disqualification match to become the number one contender to the ROH World Championship. Hardy received his title shot at the following day's Ring of Honor Wrestling tapings, but was defeated by the defending champion, Jay Briscoe. Later that same day, S.C.U.M. was forced to disband after losing a Steel Cage Warfare match against Team ROH. On December 14, 2013, at Final Battle 2013, Hardy defeated Adam Page in a singles match; later on in the main event, Hardy aided Adam Cole in retaining his title and forming a tag team with him. After aiding Cole at Supercard of Honor VIII, Hardy was given Jay Briscoe's unofficial "Real World Title" belt, which he renamed the "ROH Iconic Championship". In July, Hardy opted out of his ROH contract and went back to TNA.

=== Return to TNA (2014–2017) ===
==== The Hardys third reunion (2014–2015) ====
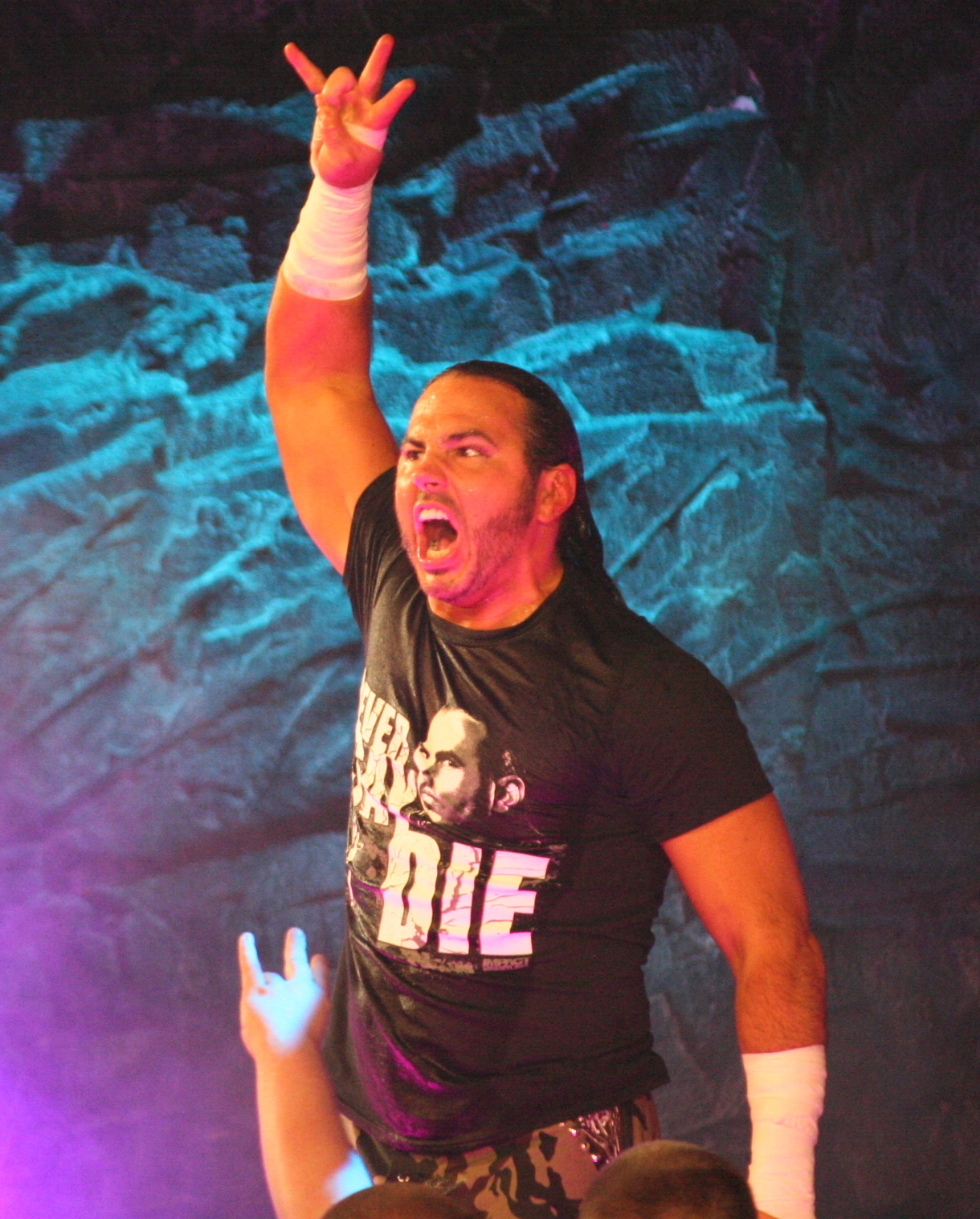
Hardy making his entrance at a set of TNA television tapings in 2014

On July 24, 2014, Hardy returned to TNA and reunited with Jeff to reform The Hardys for the third time. At the Destination X episode of Impact Wrestling, The Hardys were defeated by The Wolves in a match for the TNA World Tag Team Championship. On the August 14 episode of Impact Wrestling, Team 3D (formerly the Dudley Boyz) challenged The Hardys to a match, which Team 3D won. At the Hardcore Justice episode of Impact Wrestling, The Hardys and Team 3D talked about a match involving themselves and The Wolves. When The Wolves were asked by the two teams, they agreed. Later that night, Kurt Angle announced all three teams would compete in a best of three series for the TNA World Tag Team Championship with the winners of the first match choosing the stipulation of the next one. The Hardys won the second match of the series on the September 10 episode of Impact Wrestling in a tables match and choose a ladder match for the third match of the series. The Hardys were unsuccessful in winning that match on the September 17 episode of Impact Wrestling, as the Wolves won that match. The Wolves then went on to pick the final match of the series to be a Full Metal Mayhem match to take place on the October 8 episode of Impact Wrestling. The Hardys were unsuccessful in that match as the Wolves won that match.

On October 22, The Hardys entered a number one contenders tournament for the TNA World Tag Team Championship defeating The BroMans (Jessie Godderz and DJ Z) in the first round of the tournament. On the October 29 episode of Impact Wrestling, The Hardys defeated Team Dixie (Ethan Carter III and Tyrus) in the semifinals to advance to the finals of the tournament, where they defeated Samoa Joe and Low Ki to become number one contenders for the TNA World Tag Team Championship. On the January 16, 2015, episode of Impact Wrestling, The Hardys defeated the Wolves. At the Lockdown episode of Impact Wrestling, The Hardys were defeated by The Revolution in a six sides of steel cage match for the TNA World Tag Team Championship. On the February 20 episode of Impact Wrestling, Hardy and The Wolves defeated The Revolution in a six-man tag team match. In March, The Hardys participated in a tournament for the vacant TNA World Tag Team Championship. On March 16, 2015, Matt and Jeff won an Ultimate X match for the titles. On May 8, 2015, Hardy vacated the TNA World Tag Team Championship due to his brother Jeff being injured.

==== World Heavyweight Champion (2015–2016) ====
On June 28, 2015, Hardy was among the five wrestlers who competed for the TNA King of the Mountain Championship at Slammiversary, with Jeff Jarrett ultimately emerging victorious. On the July 8 episode of Impact Wrestling, Hardy requested a world title shot against Ethan Carter III, but was denied and forced to face the Dirty Heels (Austin Aries and Bobby Roode) in a handicap match, which he lost. On the July 22 episode of Impact Wrestling, Hardy defeated Roode in a Tables match to become the #1 contender for the TNA World Heavyweight Championship. On the August 5 episode of Impact Wrestling, Hardy got his shot at the title against EC3 in a Full Metal Mayhem match, but failed to win the title. On the September 2 episode of Impact Wrestling, Hardy got another shot at the TNA World Heavyweight Championship against EC3, but again failed to win the title; as part of the storyline, Jeff Hardy was forced to act as Ethan Carter's personal assistant. On the September 30 episode of Impact Wrestling, Hardy was added to the Ethan Carter III vs. Drew Galloway main event match for the TNA World Heavyweight Championship at Bound for Glory after he and Galloway defeated Carter and Tyrus, making it a three-way match, following which Jeff, who EC3 had just "fired" in the previous episode, was revealed to be the special guest referee.

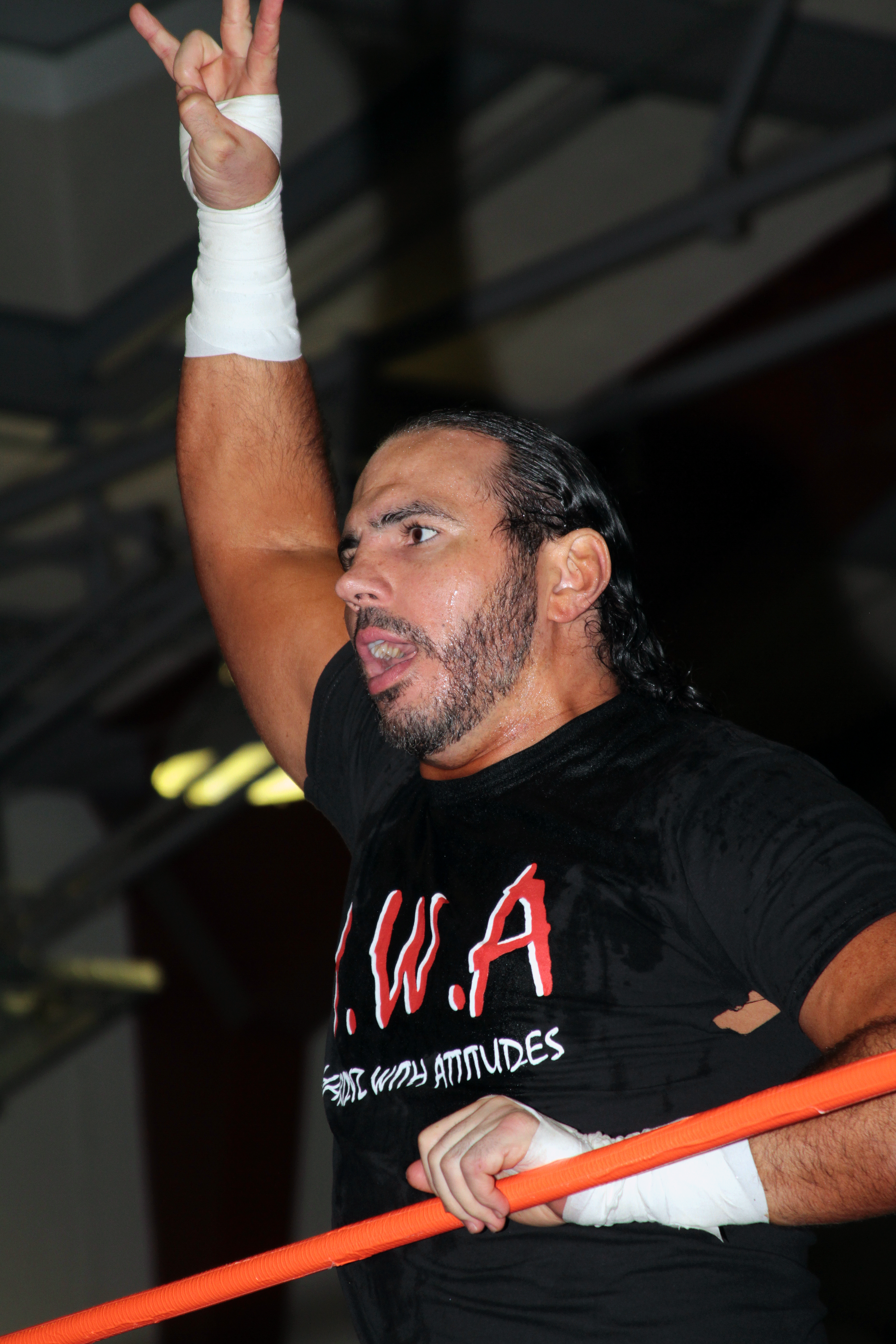
Hardy performing one of his signature poses in 2016

On October 4 at Bound for Glory, Matt won the TNA World Heavyweight Championship by pinning Galloway. However, EC3 filed an injunction (kayfabe) that banned Hardy from appearing on Impact Wrestling for a month, which forced Hardy to relinquish the title in order to stay on the show. However, Hardy had been participating in the TNA World Title Series for the vacant title. He qualified to the round of 16 by defeating Davey Richards, Robbie E and Eddie Edwards. He then advanced to the round of 8 by defeating the King of the Mountain Champion Bobby Roode and then to Jessie Godderz to continue his winning streak. The semifinals and finals were held on the January 5, 2016, live episode of Impact Wrestling during its debut on Pop TV, in which he defeated Eric Young to advance to the final round. Hardy faced EC3 in the TNA World Title Series finals, but lost the match via pinfall.

Hardy won the TNA World Title from EC3 on the January 19, 2016, episode of Impact Wrestling, becoming the first man to defeat him in a one-on-one match in TNA. During the match a double turn took place; Hardy turned heel after Tyrus betrayed EC3. The following week on Impact Wrestling, Jeff Hardy had confronted him about last week and issued a challenge to Matt for the World Heavyweight title in the main event and Matt accepted. However, later before the main event could begin, Eric Young and Bram attacked Jeff from behind. Kurt Angle then came out to try save Jeff, and Matt had Tyrus attack Angle from behind. While Matt watched from the ramp, Young attacked Jeff with the Piledriver off the apron through a table. The following week, he retained his title against Angle. At Lockdown, he retained his title in a Six-side of steel match against Ethan Carter III, with the help of Rockstar Spud. He lost his title against Drew Galloway on the March 15 episode of Impact Wrestling, after a match featuring EC3 and Jeff Hardy.

Two weeks later he received a rematch for the title on Impact Wrestling, but was again defeated by Galloway. After losing the title he started a feud with Jeff. On the April 19 episode of Impact Wrestling, an I Quit match ended in a no-contest as both Matt and Jeff were badly injured and Matt was taken out to the hospital on a stretcher.

==== The Broken Universe (2016–2017) ====
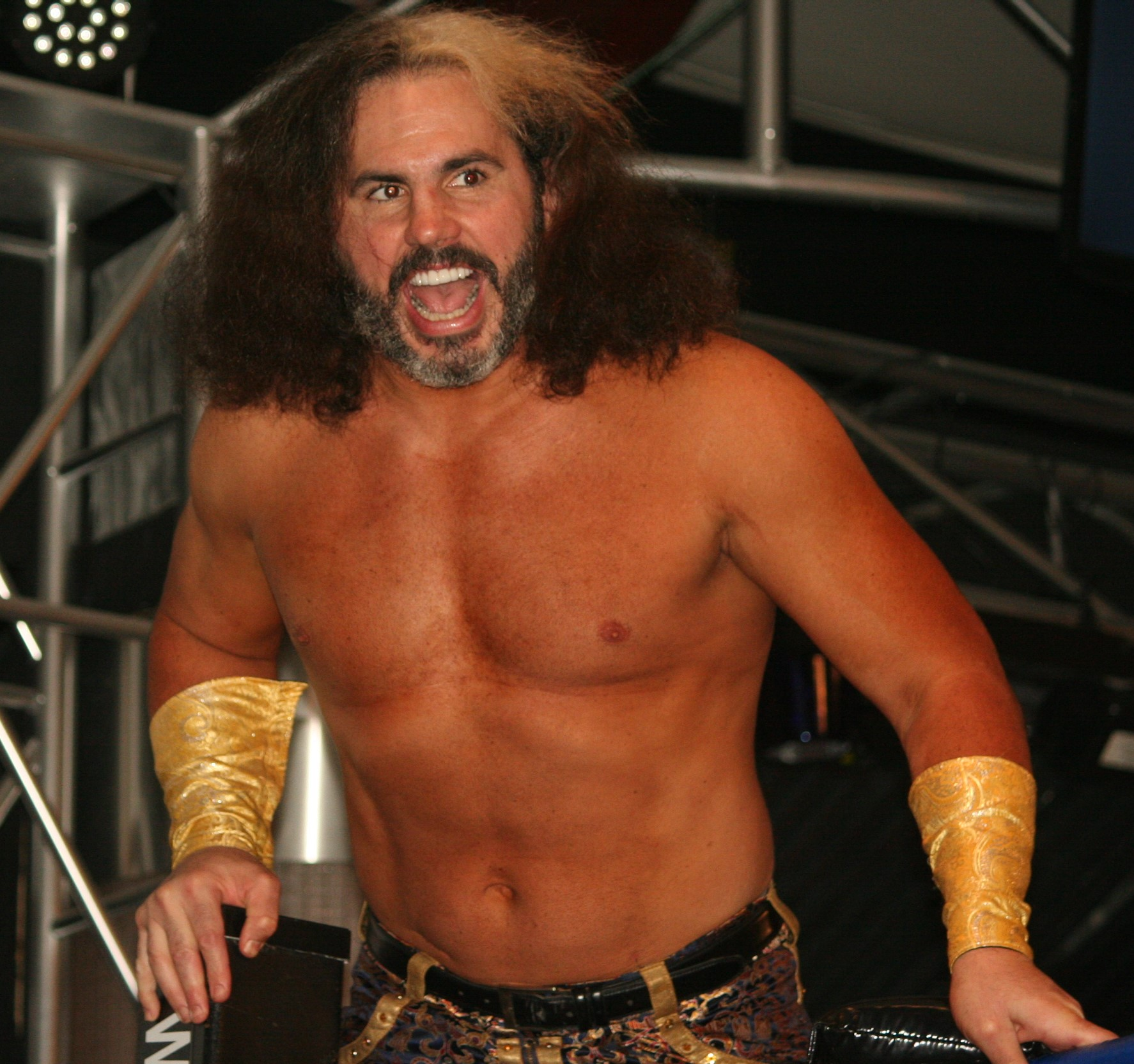
'Broken' Matt Hardy in January 2017.jpg

Hardy returned on May 17 episode of Impact Wrestling, revealing himself to be one of the impostor Willows behind the attacks on Jeff. Later that night, he attacked Jeff. In the following weeks, Hardy debuted a new persona as a "Broken" man with part of his hair bleached blonde along with a strange sophisticated accent, blaming Jeff (who he began referring to as "Brother Nero", Nero being Jeff's middle name) for breaking him and becoming obsessed with "deleting" him. His line “Delete”, is mostly inspired by the Death Note manga/anime series character Teru Mikami. On June 12, at Slammiversary, Matt was defeated by Jeff in a Full Metal Mayhem match. On the June 21 episode of Impact Wrestling, Matt was once again defeated by Jeff in a Six Sides of Steel match. On the June 28 episode of Impact Wrestling, Matt challenged Jeff to a final battle with the Hardy brand on the line, to take place at their home in Cameron, North Carolina the next week. On July 5, during special episode "The Final Deletion", Matt defeated Jeff in the match to become sole owner of the Hardy brand, forcing Jeff to drop his last name and become referred to as "Brother Nero".

On the August 18 episode of Impact Wrestling, Matt and Brother Nero defeated The Tribunal, The BroMans and The Helms Dynasty in an "Ascension To Hell" match for an opportunity to challenge Decay for the TNA World Tag Team Championship. On September 8, during special episode "Delete or Decay", the Hardys faced Decay in a match held at the Hardy compound, where Brother Nero sacrificed himself to save Matt from Abyss. Thanks to Brother Nero's sacrifice, Hardy was able to confront Rosemary and prevent his son Maxel from being abducted, which turned Hardy babyface as a result, and he furthered the face turn by healing Brother Nero in the Lake of Reincarnation. At Bound for Glory, the Hardys defeated Decay in "The Great War" to win the TNA World Tag Team Championship for the second time. On the October 6 episode of Impact Wrestling, they successfully defended their titles against Decay, in a Wolf Creek match.

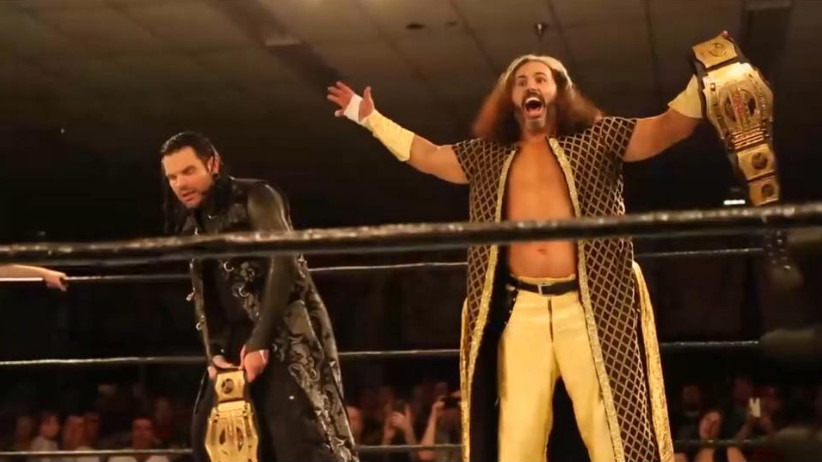
The Broken Hardys as TNA Tag Team Champions

On the November 3 episode of Impact Wrestling, the Hardys successfully defended the titles against The Tribunal. After the match, the Hardys were attacked by the masked trio known as Death Crew Council (DCC). After accepting DCC's title challenge, The Hardys faced Bram and Kingston, and Matt pinned Kingston to retain the titles. On December 15, during special episode "Total Nonstop Deletion", they were once again successful in retaining. Brother Nero attacked Crazzy Steve with the Twist of Fate, who then fell into a volcano (that had appeared on the compound in the weeks leading up the event), and was shot up into the sky, landing in the ring. Matt then covered him to win the match.

On the January 12, 2017, episode of Impact Wrestling, The Hardys successfully defended their titles against The Wolves. At Genesis, The Hardys retained their titles against the DCC and Decay in a three-way tag team match. On Open Fight Night, the Hardys began a storyline where they would teleport to different promotions and win that promotions' tag team championship gold, which was referred to by Matt as their "Expedition of Gold". On February 27, Hardy announced that both he and Jeff had finally left TNA, following years of speculation, with their contracts expiring that week. Though the two sides were reportedly close to a contract agreement, talks began to break down and changes in management prompted their departure from the company. The TNA World Tag Team Championships were vacated due to the Hardys' departure and was explained on TNA television in a segment where The Hardys teleported to their next Expedition of Gold destination, but a technicality resulted in them disappearing and the belts appearing in the arms of Decay.

==== Broken gimmick legal battle ====
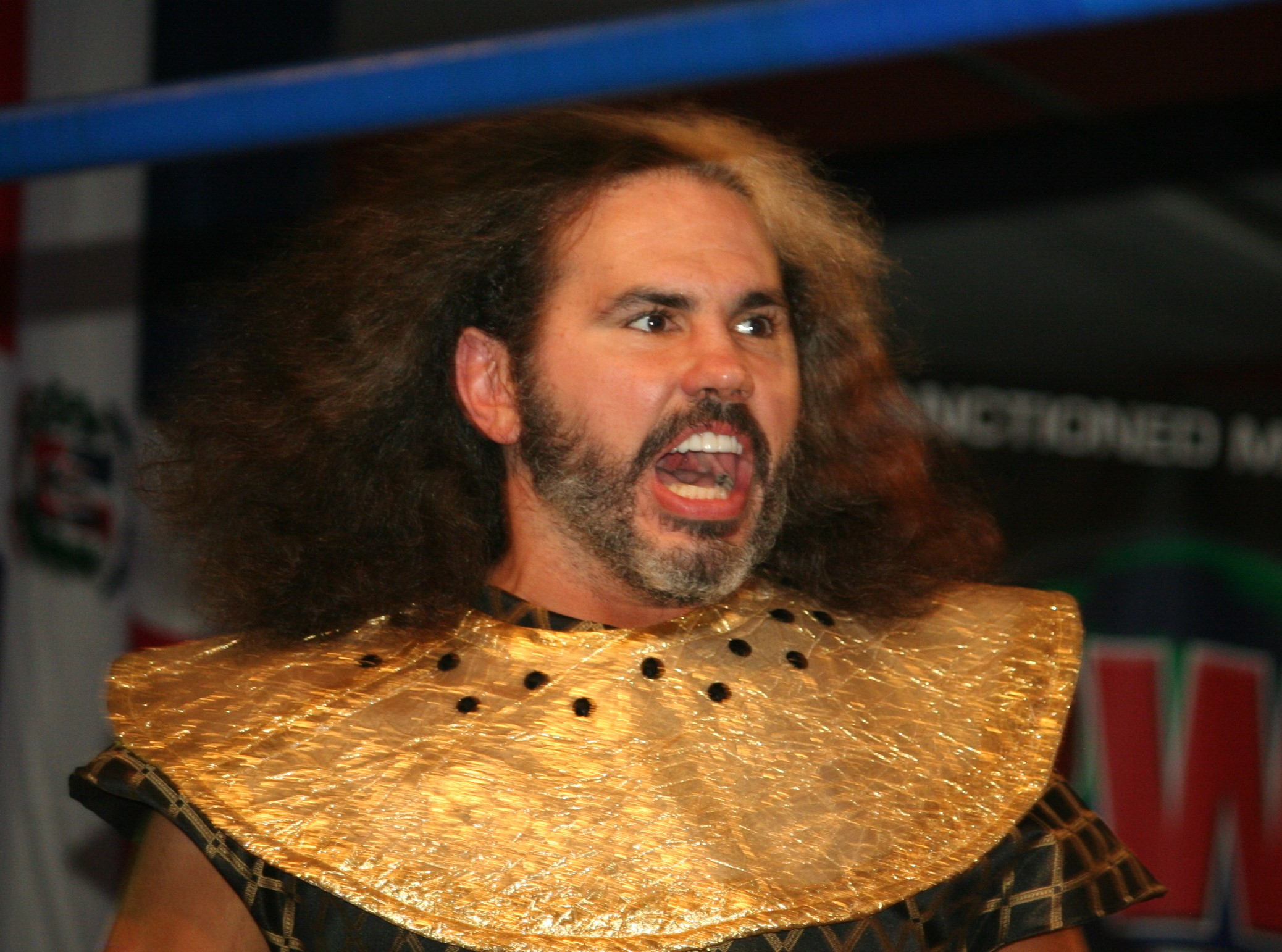
Hardy in a ring under his critically acclaimed Broken gimmick in 2017

Shortly after the departure of Matt and Jeff from TNA was made public, Matt's wife, Reby, went on a social media tirade in which she repeatedly slammed TNA, the company's new management and the way in which contract negotiations between the company and the Hardy family were conducted. A few weeks following this, the bad blood between the two sides intensified, so much so that the new management of TNA (now renamed Impact Wrestling) Anthem Sports & Entertainment issued a cease and desist letter to The Hardys' new promotion Ring of Honor (ROH), in which Anthem essentially ordered ROH as well as any broadcasting company airing ROH's 15th Anniversary pay–per–view show (on which The Hardys were to participate in a match) to not in any way speak of, indicate or acknowledge the existence of the Broken Matt and Brother Nero characters and instead to refer to The Hardys as simply Matt Hardy and Jeff Hardy. While The Hardys were in TNA, they had full creative control over the Broken gimmick, with them even filming their own segments to air on TNA programming in some circumstances, thus making the Hardy family (in their belief) the owners of the Broken gimmick.

Newly–appointed TNA Wrestling President Ed Nordholm credits the invention of and the vision behind the Broken gimmick to Jeremy Borash, Dave Lagana and Billy Corgan, and while Borash specifically had the most input into the gimmick of the three aside from Matt, the Hardy family deny that Borash was the sole person behind the gimmick. In November 2017, Impact Wrestling changed their policy, allowing all talent to retain complete ownership over their intellectual property, essentially forfeiting ownership of the "Broken" character to Hardy.

On January 31, 2018, the legal battle officially concluded when Matt legally acquired ownership of all trademarks related to the Broken universe and the Broken gimmick, which includes 'Broken Matt', 'Brother Nero', 'Broken Brilliance' and 'Vanguard1'.

=== International matches (2014–2015) ===
On November 1, 2014, Hardy traveled to Japan to compete for Wrestle-1 at the promotions Keiji Muto 30th Anniversary Hold Out show in a triple threat match against Seiya Sanada and Tajiri, which he lost.

On May 24, 2015, Hardy traveled to Mexico to compete as a team captain for Team TNA/Lucha Underground with teammates Mr. Anderson and Johnny Mundo at Lucha Libre AAA Worldwide's 2015 Lucha Libre World Cup pay–per–view show. In the quarter–final round, Team TNA/Lucha Underground faced Team Rest of the World (Drew Galloway, Angélico and El Mesías) to a 15-minute time limit draw, with Team TNA/Lucha Underground winning in overtime and advancing to the semi–final round. In the semi–final round, Team TNA/Lucha Underground defeated Team MexLeyendas (Blue Demon Jr., Dr. Wagner Jr. and El Solar) to advance to the final round. In the final round, Team TNA/Lucha Underground faced Dream Team (El Patrón Alberto, Myzteziz and Rey Mysterio Jr.) to a 15–minute time limit draw, with Dream Team winning both the match and the tournament in overtime with Hardy on the losing end of the final pinfall.

=== Second return to ROH (2016–2017) ===
On December 2, 2016, Hardy returned to ROH for the second time while still under contract with TNA, appearing at the promotions Final Battle pay-per-view show as Broken Matt, where a video message showed him addressing The Young Bucks (Matt Jackson and Nick Jackson) and The Briscoes (Jay Briscoe and Mark Briscoe).

The most important thing in the professional wrestling industry in this day and age of technology and the Internet and social media is to be able to make wrestling unpredictable. We were very happy we were able to do that, and it's one of the things I take a lot of pride in, along with my universe. I do all that I can to surprise people and make things unpredictable because that is what makes wrestling fun. Matt Hardy may be dysfunctional, but you can't spell dysfunctional without fun. My goal in the professional wrestling industry is to put fun into the dysfunctionality of it.

— Matt on his surprise second return to ROH at Final Battle

On March 4, 2017, in the same week that both Matt and Jeff were released from TNA, The Hardys defeated The Young Bucks in an impromptu match at ROH's 2017 installment of the company's Manhattan Mayhem show series to become the new ROH World Tag Team Champions for the first time. Moments after winning the titles, Hardy announced in a post-match promo that both he and Brother Nero (Jeff) had signed "the biggest ROH contracts in (the company's) history". It was later confirmed that the contracts were short-term, only for the "immediate future". On March 10, The Hardys successfully defended the ROH World Tag Team Championship for the first time at ROH's 15th Anniversary pay-per-view show against The Young Bucks and Roppongi Vice (Beretta and Rocky Romero) in a three-way Las Vegas tag team street fight match. Prior to the event, the Hardys had been sent a legal threat by Impact Wrestling regarding the use of the Broken Matt and Brother Nero gimmicks. The following night on March 11, The Hardys (not billed but using the Broken gimmicks anyway) once again retained the titles, this time against The Briscoes at a set of Ring of Honor Wrestling television tapings. The Hardys lost the titles back to The Young Bucks in a ladder match on April 1 at ROH's Supercard of Honor XI pay-per-view show, which would be the final ROH appearances for both Hardys in this tenure with the promotion.

=== Second return to WWE (2017–2020) ===
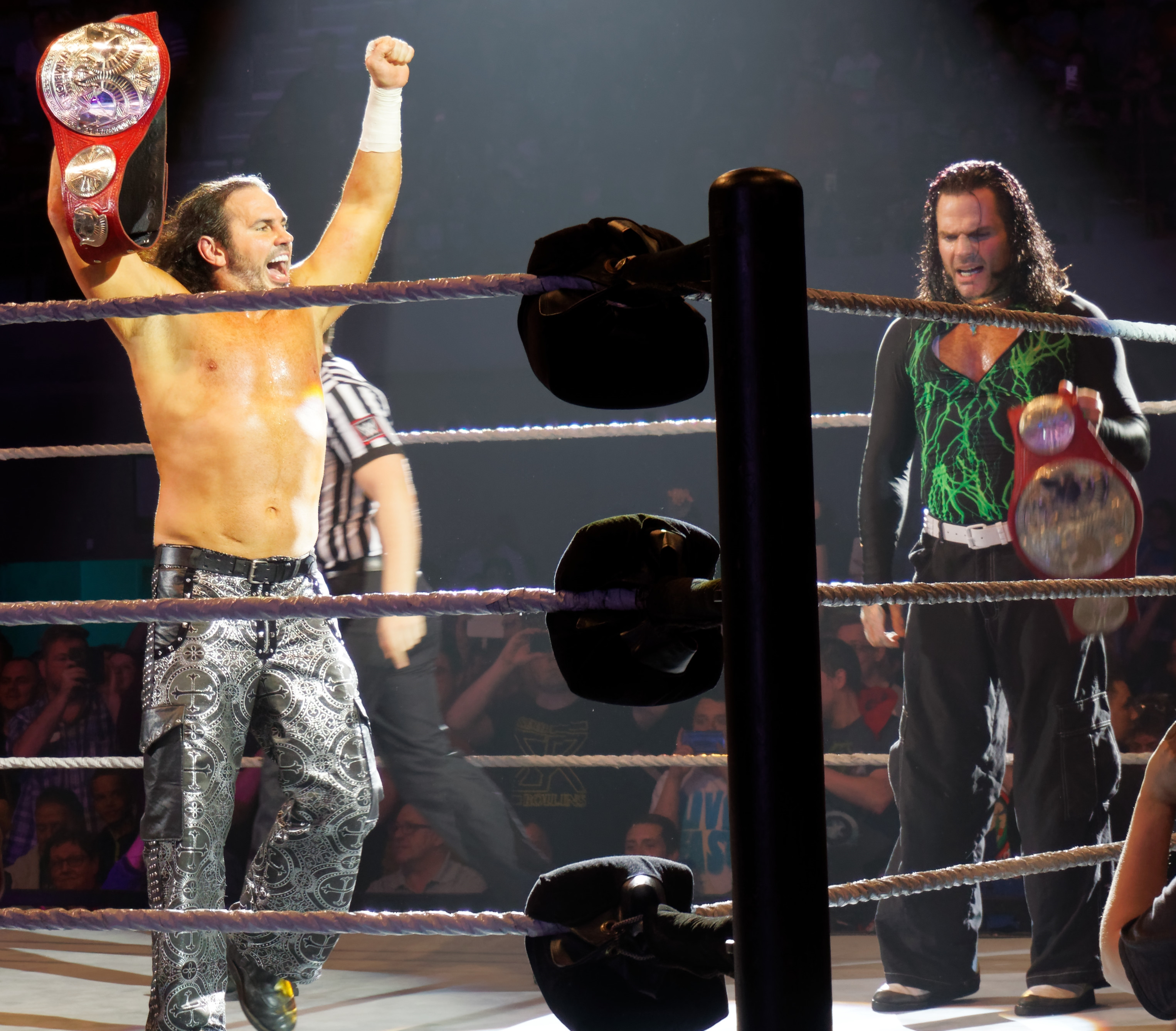
The Hardy Boyz won the Raw Tag Team Championship at WrestleMania 33, and held it until Extreme Rules

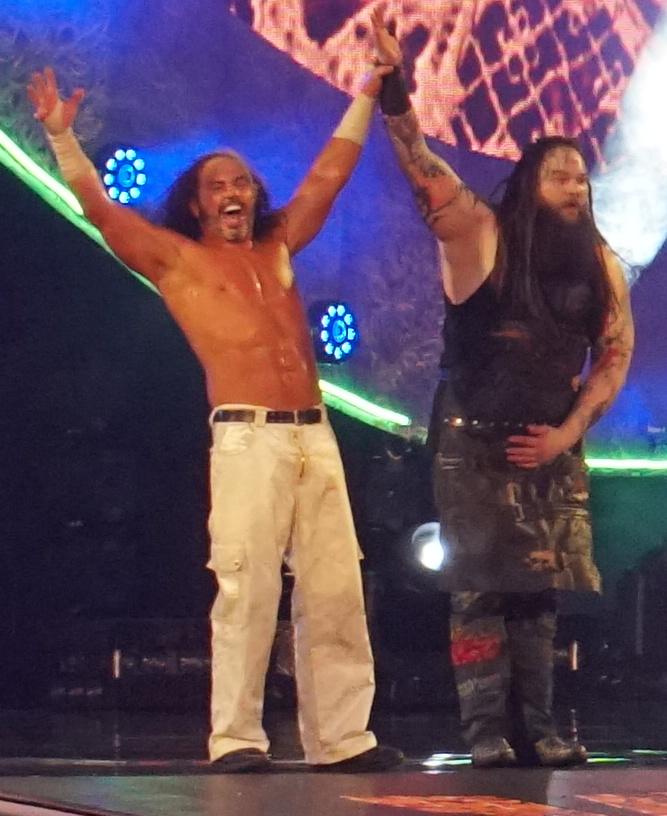
Hardy, shown here after winning the André the Giant Memorial Battle Royal at WrestleMania 34, teamed with Bray Wyatt in 2018, and won the Raw Tag Team Championships

==== Tag team championship reigns (2017–2019) ====
At the WrestleMania 33 pay-per-view on April 2, 2017, Hardy made his surprise return to WWE, along with his brother Jeff Hardy, being added as last-minute participants in the ladder match for the Raw Tag Team Championship, defeating Gallows and Anderson, Cesaro and Sheamus, and Enzo and Cass to win the Raw Tag Team Championship. Afterwards on Raw Talk, Hardy mentioned that The Hardy Boyz had successfully completed the Expedition of Gold, after winning the Raw Tag Team Championship. At Payback, The Hardy Boyz retained their championships against Cesaro and Sheamus, who attacked them after the match. The next night on Raw, Cesaro and Sheamus explained their actions, claiming the fans were more supportive of 'novelty acts' from the past like The Hardy Boyz, who they feel did not deserve to be in the match at WrestleMania 33. Subsequently, at Extreme Rules, The Hardy Boyz lost the titles against Cesaro and Sheamus in a steel cage match, and failed to regain it back the following month at the Great Balls of Fire event. Afterwards, it was revealed that Jeff had gotten injured and would be out for an estimated six months, thus Hardy began wrestling in singles matches.

During his feud with Bray Wyatt, Hardy introduced his "Woken" gimmick, after Impact Wrestling dropped their claim to the gimmick and Hardy gained full ownership of it. Wyatt defeated Hardy at Raw 25 on January 22, 2018, and Hardy defeated Wyatt at Elimination Chamber on February 25. Their final match happened on the March 19 episode of Raw, dubbed The Ultimate Deletion, with Hardy winning after distractions from Señor Benjamin. Wyatt then disappeared after being thrown into the Lake of Reincarnation. At WrestleMania 34 on April 7, Hardy competed in the annual André the Giant Memorial Battle Royal, and won the match due to a distraction by the returning Wyatt. After WrestleMania, Hardy and Wyatt performed as a tag team, sometimes referred to as The Deleters of Worlds. They won a tournament for the vacant Raw Tag Team Championship, defeating Cesaro and Sheamus at the Greatest Royal Rumble event to win the title. However, they lost the titles at Extreme Rules to The B-Team (Bo Dallas and Curtis Axel). On the July 23 episode of Raw, Hardy and Wyatt received a rematch for the titles, but was again defeated by The B-Team. Following this, Hardy revealed that he was taking time off due to his back fusing with his pelvis, effectively disbanding the team. According to Hardy, the reason WWE disbanded the team was because he and Wyatt pitched several ideas to WWE to work with their characters.

After more than seven months of absence from television, Hardy returned on the February 26, 2019, episode of SmackDown Live, teaming with his brother Jeff to defeat The Bar (Cesaro and Sheamus). At WrestleMania 35 on April 7, Hardy competed in the André the Giant Memorial Battle Royal, but was eliminated by eventual winner, Braun Strowman. Two days later on SmackDown Live, The Hardy Boyz defeated The Usos to win the SmackDown Tag Team Championship. The reign only lasted 21 days (recognized as 20 days by WWE), as they had to vacate the title due to Jeff injuring his knee, this was explained in storyline as injuries afflicted by Lars Sullivan. After his brother Jeff's injury, Hardy began to appear on WWE programming less frequently.

==== Sporadic appearances and departure (2019–2020) ====
At Super ShowDown on June 7, Hardy competed in the 51-man Battle Royal, which was eventually won by Mansoor. From November to December, Hardy occasionally appeared on Raw, losing matches against superstars like Buddy Murphy, Drew McIntyre, Ricochet and Erick Rowan.

On the February 10, 2020, episode of Raw, Hardy confronted Randy Orton about Orton's attack on Edge two weeks earlier. Hardy then got himself into a brawl with him moments after, and was viciously attacked by Orton. The following week on Raw, an injured Hardy appeared and was once again assaulted by Orton, which would be his final appearance in WWE. On March 2, Hardy announced his departure from WWE through his official YouTube channel, where Hardy said that while he was grateful towards the people behind the scenes, he said he was also on different pages with WWE as he felt he needed to have creative input and still had more to give. Later that day, WWE announced that his contract had expired.

=== All Elite Wrestling (2020–2024) ===
==== Multiple personalities (2020–2021) ====
Hardy made his All Elite Wrestling (AEW) debut on the March 18, 2020, episode of Dynamite, reverting to his "Broken" gimmick and being announced as the replacement for the kayfabe injured Nick Jackson on The Elite's team at Blood and Guts. However, the event was postponed to the following year due to the COVID-19 pandemic. On the May 6 episode of Dynamite, Hardy wrestled his first match with AEW, teaming up with Kenny Omega for a street fight against The Inner Circle's Chris Jericho and Sammy Guevara, and Hardy and Omega lost when Jericho pinned Omega. During this period, due to the lack of live audience, Hardy felt that the Broken character needed the fans, so he began to include several of his gimmicks alongside the Broken gimmick, including Big Money Matt, Matt Hardy V1, and Unkillable Matt Hardy, being referred to as "Multifarious" Matt Hardy. AEW president Tony Khan later admitted that he "wasn't a fan" of the Broken gimmick and much preferred more realistic presentations in wrestling.

At Double or Nothing, Hardy teamed with The Elite to defeat The Inner Circle in the first ever Stadium Stampede match. During the match, Santana and Ortiz dunked Hardy in the stadium pool, which acted as a version of the Lake of Reincarnation, as Hardy kept cycling through his various gimmicks throughout his career when he surfaced. Hardy then feuded with Sammy Guevara, and after Hardy defeated Guevara in a Broken Rules match at All Out, Hardy took time off until he was cleared to return, due to an injury sustained during the match. On the September 16 episode of Dynamite, Hardy aligned with Private Party (Isiah Kassidy and Marq Quen) as their manager, but was attacked backstage before their match. The attacker was later revealed as Guevara and The Elite Deletion match was announced, which took place at The Hardy Compound in Cameron, North Carolina, where Hardy won.

==== The Hardy Family Office (2021–2022) ====
Hardy then switched to his Big Money persona as he focused on managing Private Party. Over the following weeks, Hardy would display villainous tactics as he began cheating during matches much to Private Party's dismay. On the January 20, 2021, episode of Dynamite, Hardy and Private Party defeated Matt Sydal and Top Flight (Dante Martin and Darius Martin) after using a steel chair before attacking Sydal and Top Flight afterwards, thus turning heel. Hardy then approached Adam Page to accompany and befriend him, and during tag team matches, Hardy would always tag himself in and pick up the victory for his team to Page's behest. After Page set up a match between Hardy and himself, Hardy double-crossed Page, with Private Party and The Hybrid 2 (Angélico and Jack Evans) attacking Page until The Dark Order came out to save him. At the Revolution event, Hardy lost to Page despite multiple interferences from Private Party.

Following Revolution, Hardy became the manager for The Butcher and The Blade (with their valet The Bunny in tow), and along with Private Party, the stable became known as the Matt Hardy Empire before settling on the name Hardy Family Office. Hardy also added The Hybrid 2 to his group in July having previously hiring them on a mercenary basis. At Double or Nothing, Hardy competed in Casino Battle Royale but was eliminated by Christian Cage. This led to a match between the two at Fyter Fest, where Hardy lost to Cage. In August, Matt Hardy and HFO began a feud with Orange Cassidy and Best Friends, which led to a match on the August 25 episode of Dynamite, where Hardy was defeated by Cassidy. However, on the November 12 episode of Rampage, Hardy defeated Cassidy in a Lumberjack match, thanks to an interference from HFO and the heel lumberjacks. Their feud ended on the November 17 episode of Dynamite where his team of The Butcher and The Blade lost to the team of Cassidy and Tomohiro Ishii, where Cassidy gave a crossbody to the interfering Hardy and The Blade during the match. At Revolution 2022, Hardy would lose a Tornado tag team match with Andrade El Idolo and Isiah Kassidy against Sammy Guevara, Darby Allin, and Sting.

==== The Hardy Boyz reunion and The Firm (2022–2024) ====
On the March 9 episode of Dynamite, Matt was attacked by Team AHFO (Andrade, Private Party, Butcher and Blade), which he was later saved by Darby Allin, Sting, and the debuting Jeff Hardy. He reunited with his brother Jeff, thus turning face in the process. On the October 12 episode of Dynamite, Stokely Hathaway reveals he has bought Private Party's contracts from LFI. During this segment, a challenge is made for Rampage for a match between Ethan Page and Isiah Kassidy. If Kassidy wins, Private Party is free from The Firm. If Page wins, The Firm acquires Matt Hardy's contract. On the October 14 episode of Rampage, Page won the match which Hardy and Private Party would have to join The Firm. Over the next few week, Hardy was banned from using the Hardy theme and Twist of Fate. On April 12, 2023, episode of Dynamite, Matt and Kassidy was attacked by The Firm (Ethan Page, Lee Moriarty and Big Bill), which they were later saved by Hook and a returning Jeff Hardy. On April 8, 2024, it was reported that Hardy’s contract had expired and he had chosen not to re-sign.

=== Second return to TNA (2024–present) ===
Hardy made his surprise return to TNA on April 20, 2024, at Rebellion, reverting to his "Broken" persona and attacking TNA World Champion Moose. On June 14, at Against All Odds, Hardy challenged Moose for the title in a Broken Rules match, but was unsuccessful. Following the bout, Jeff Hardy made his return to TNA, coming to his brother’s aid after a post-match attack by Moose and The System.

On June 28, 2024, Hardy teamed with his wife Reby, defeating Alisha and Eddie Edwards of The System. The following night, Hardy reunited with Jeff to challenge Edwards and Brian Myers for the Impact World Tag Team Championship, winning by disqualification. After The System’s JDC injured Jeff in storyline, Hardy went on to defeat JDC at Slammiversary.

On the August 31, 2024 episode of Impact, The Hardys defeated The System in a non-title match. At Victory Road, they scored another victory over Fir$t Cla$$, establishing themselves as the number one contenders to the tag team titles.

At Bound for Glory on October 26, The Hardy Boyz defeated The System (Myers and Edwards) and Ace Austin & Chris Bey in a three-way Full Metal Mayhem match to win the Impact World Tag Team Championship. At Final Resolution, they retained the titles against The System in a tables match.

At Rebellion, The Hardys lost the championships to Nic and Ryan Nemeth, ending their reign at 183 days. They regained the titles at Slammiversary in a four-way ladder match also involving the Nemeths, The Rascalz, and Fir$t Cla$$. At Bound for Glory on October 12, Hardys retained the TNA and NXT Tag Team titles against Team 3D (Bully Ray and Devon) in a tables match, where it was a retirement match for Team 3D.

=== Third return to WWE (2025) ===
While still contracted to TNA, the Hardy Boyz made a return appearance with WWE during the February 25, 2025 episode of NXT. At NXT: Roadblock on March 11, The Hardy Boyz successfully defended the TNA World Tag Team Championship against NXT Tag Team Champions Nathan Frazer and Axiom. At NXT vs. TNA Showdown on October 7, the Hardy Boyz won the NXT Tag Team Championship after defeating DarkState's Dion Lennox and Osiris Griffin in a Winners Take All match. At NXT Halloween Havoc on October 25, Lennox and Griffin regained the NXT Tag Team Championships from The Hardy Boyz, who wrestled as The Broken Hardys, in a Broken Rules match.

== Professional wrestling style and persona ==
After the creation of his Broken character, Hardy was praised by several wrestlers and critics for reinventing himself several times during his career. During his career, Hardy has won the Wrestling Observer Newsletter Best Gimmick award two times under two different characters, once in 2002 and again in 2016.

== Personal life ==
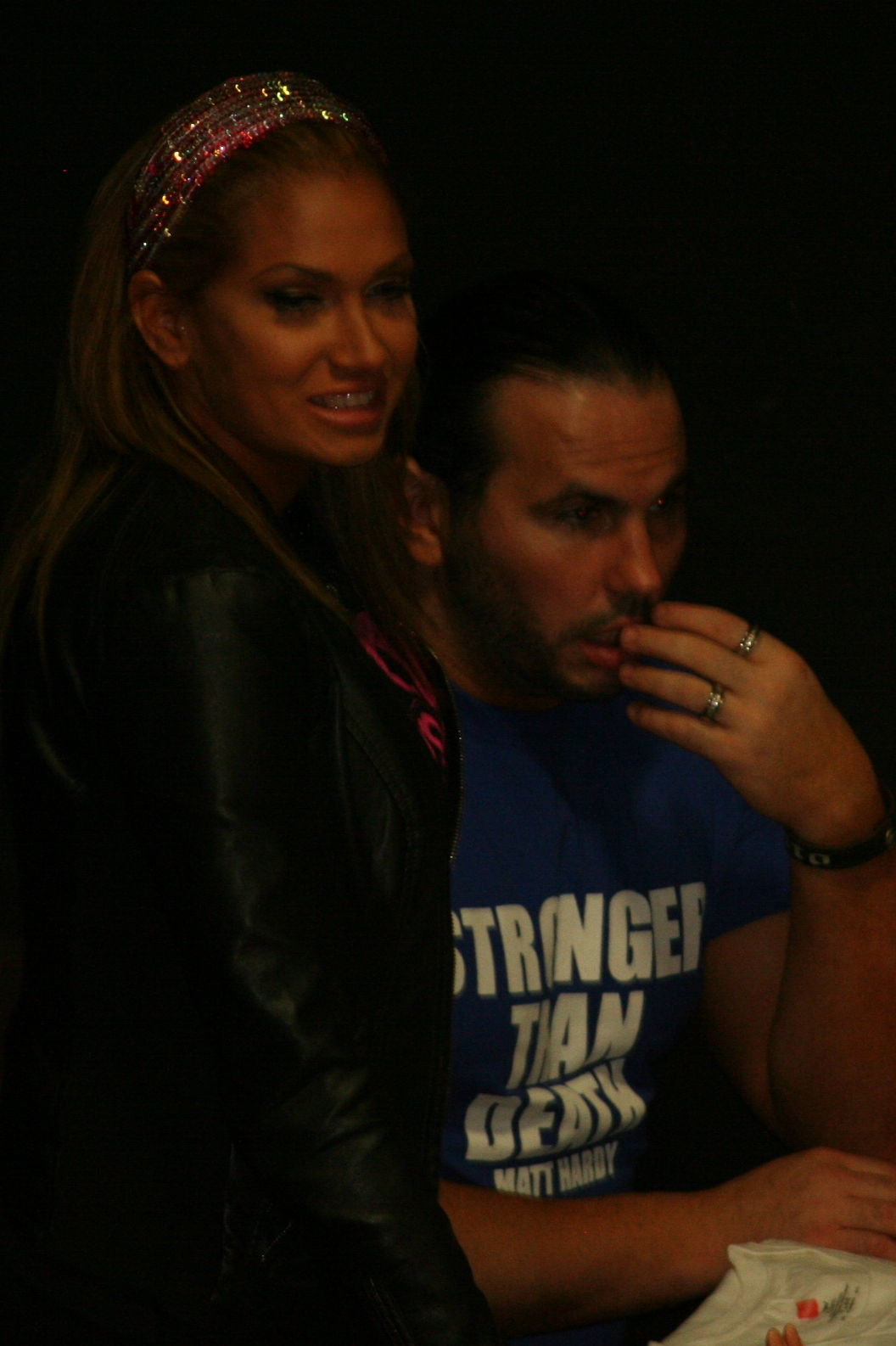
Hardy with his wife Reby Sky in 2014

Hardy was in a six-year relationship with wrestler Amy Dumas, better known as Lita. They first met in January 1999 at a NWA Mid-Atlantic show but did not begin dating until a few months later. They broke up in February 2005 when he discovered that she was having an affair with one of Hardy's close friends, fellow wrestler Adam Copeland, better known as Edge. Hardy also dated WWE wrestler Ashley Massaro.

Hardy married wrestler Rebecca Reyes, better known as Reby Sky, on October 5, 2013. They have three sons and one daughter. Hardy had previously been an addict, and credits his wife for helping him get clean.

Hardy is good friends with fellow wrestlers Marty Garner, Shannon Moore, and Gregory Helms. In December 2020, he claimed to have Native American ancestry.

=== Legal issues ===
Hardy was arrested for alleged DUI on August 20, 2011. Two days later, he was arrested on felony drug charges when police found steroids in his home. In November 2011, Hardy was removed from court-ordered rehab and sent back to jail for drinking.

In January 2014, Hardy and his wife were both arrested after a fight at a hotel.

== Other media ==
In 1999, Matt, along with his brother Jeff, appeared as an uncredited wrestler on That '70s Show episode "That Wrestling Show". Matt and Jeff also appeared on Tough Enough in early 2001, talking to and wrestling the contestants. He appeared in the February 25, 2002, episode of Fear Factor competing against five other World Wrestling Federation wrestlers, including his brother. He won $50,000 for the American Cancer Society. Hardy also appeared on the October 13, 2009, episode of Scare Tactics, as a mental patient who threatens to attack the prank's victim.

In 2001, Matt, Jeff, and Lita appeared in Rolling Stone magazine's 2001 Sports Hall of Fame issue. In 2003, Matt and Jeff, with the help of Michael Krugman, wrote and published their autobiography The Hardy Boyz: Exist 2 Inspire. As part of WWE, Matt appeared in their DVD, The Hardy Boyz: Leap of Faith in 2001. On April 29, 2008, WWE released Twist of Fate: The Matt and Jeff Hardy Story. The DVD featured footage of the brothers in OMEGA and WWE. Hardy also appears on The Hardy Show, an Internet web show which features the Hardys, Shannon Moore, and many of their friends.

Hardy plays himself in the 2013 film Pro Wrestlers vs Zombies in which he and his real-life wife Reby Sky battle the undead.

== Filmography ==
Film
Year	Title	Role	Notes
2013	Pro Wrestlers vs Zombies	Himself	

Television
Year	Title	Role	Notes
1999	That '70s Show	Wrestler No. 3	
2001	The Big Breakfast	Himself	
2001	Tough Enough	Himself	
2002	Fear Factor	Himself	Episode winner
2004	Headbangers Ball	Himself	
2009	Scare Tactics	Patient 12	
2012	The 99	Awang/Ben Hargreaves	

== Video games ==
WWE video games
Year	Title	Notes
1999	WWF WrestleMania 2000	Video game debut
2000	WWF SmackDown!	
2000	WWF Royal Rumble	
2000	WWF No Mercy	
2000	WWF SmackDown! 2: Know Your Role	
2001	WWF With Authority!	
2001	WWF Road to WrestleMania	
2001	WWF SmackDown! Just Bring It	
2002	WWF Raw	
2002	WWE WrestleMania X8	
2002	WWE SmackDown! Shut Your Mouth	
2003	WWE Crush Hour	
2003	WWE WrestleMania XIX	
2003	WWE Raw 2	
2003	WWE SmackDown! Here Comes the Pain	Cover athlete
2004	WWE Day of Reckoning	
2004	WWE SmackDown! vs. Raw	
2005	WWE WrestleMania 21	
2006	WWE SmackDown vs. Raw 2007	
2007	WWE SmackDown vs. Raw 2008	
2008	WWE SmackDown vs. Raw 2009	
2009	WWE Legends of WrestleMania	Importable character
2009	WWE SmackDown vs. Raw 2010	
2010	WWE SmackDown vs. Raw 2011	
2017	WWE 2K18	Downloadable content
2018	WWE 2K19	
2019	WWE 2K20	
2026	WWE 2K26	Ringside Pass: Season 4

AEW Video games
Year	Title	Notes
2023	AEW Fight Forever	AEW video game debut Pre-order bonus

== Championships and accomplishments ==
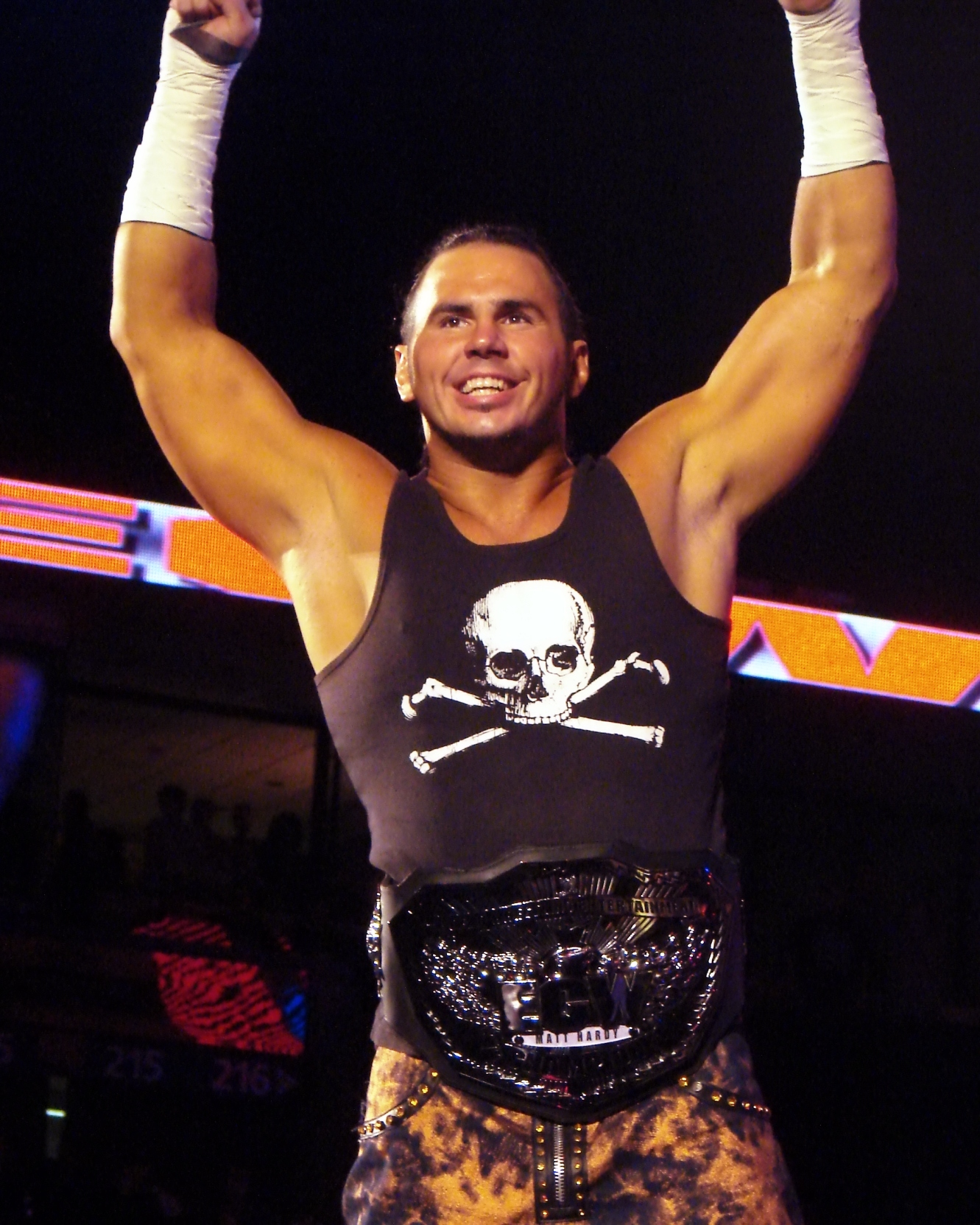
Hardy is a former ECW Champion...

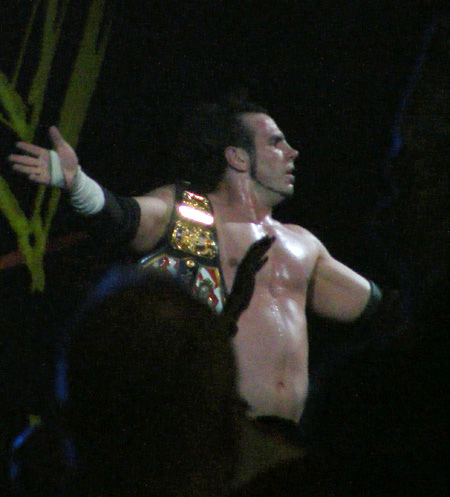
...a former United States Champion...

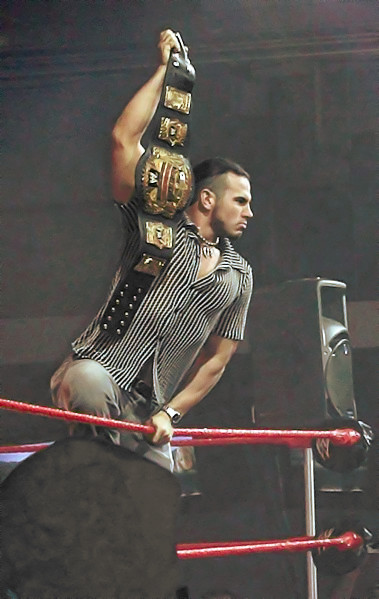
...a former Cruiserweight Champion....

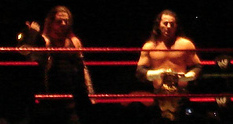
...and an overall 12-time Tag Team Champion in WWE, including six WWF/World Tag Team Championships shared with his brother Jeff

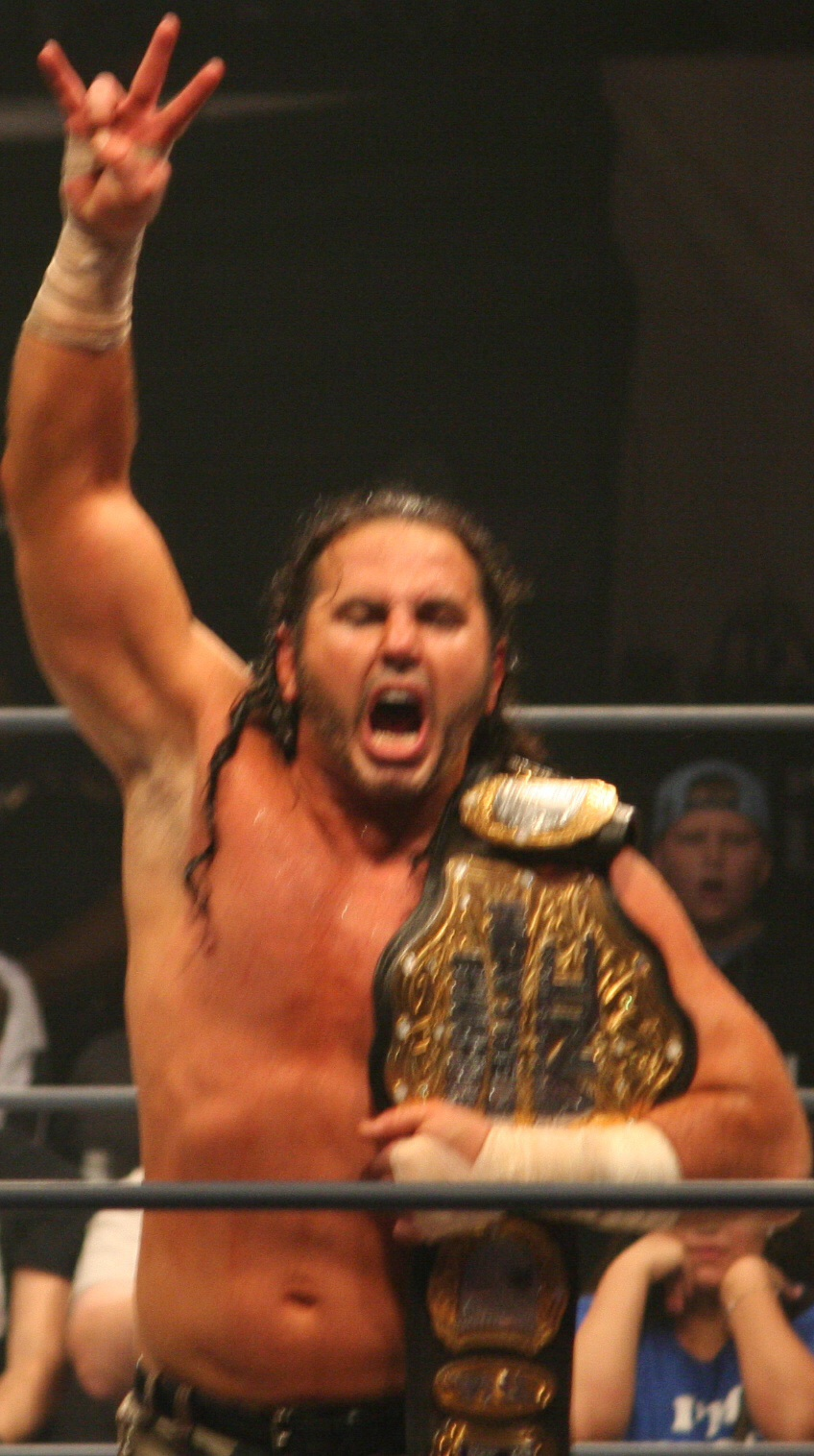
In TNA, Hardy was a two-time TNA World Heavyweight Champion...

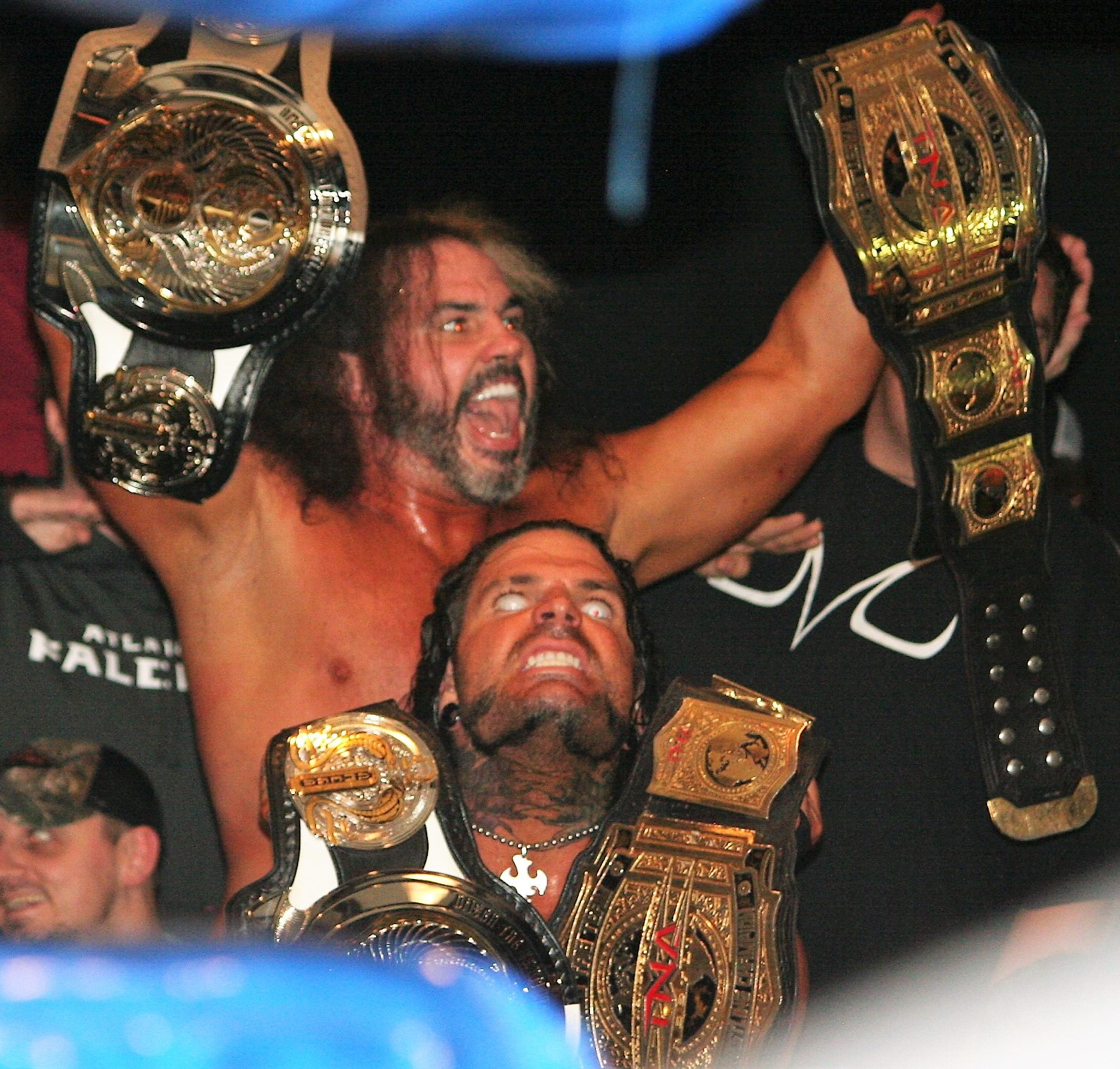
...and five-time TNA World Tag Team Champion (as well as two-time OMEGA Tag Team Champions - again with Jeff).

- 4th Rope Wrestling
  - 4th Rope Tag Team Championship (1 time, inaugural) – with Jeff Hardy
- All Elite Wrestling
  - Dynamite Award (1 time)
    - "Bleacher Report PPV Moment of the Year" (2021) – Stadium Stampede match (The Elite vs. The Inner Circle) – Double or Nothing (May 23)
- All Star Wrestling (West Virginia)
  - ASW Tag Team Championship (1 time) – with Brother Nero
- CBS Sports
  - Worst Moment of the Year (2020) vs. Sammy Guevara at All Out (2020)
- The Crash
  - The Crash Tag Team Championship (1 time) – with Brother Nero
- Future Stars of Wrestling
  - FSW Heavyweight Championship (1 time)
- House of Glory
  - HOG Tag Team Championship (2 times, current) – with Jeff Hardy
- International Wrestling Cartel
  - IWC Tag Team Championship (1 time) – with Jeff Hardy
- Maryland Championship Wrestling/MCW Pro Wrestling
  - MCW Heavyweight Championship (1 time)
  - MCW Tag Team Championship (1 time) – with Jeff Hardy
  - Extreme Rising World Championship (1 time) (Note: Hardy's reign was not recognized by Extreme Rising.)
- National Championship Wrestling
  - NCW Heavyweight Championship (1 time)
  - NCW Light Heavyweight Championship (1 time)
- New Dimension Wrestling
  - NDW Light Heavyweight Championship (1 time)
  - NDW Tag Team Championship (1 time) (Note: The title was vacated in 1999 due to The Hardy Boyz signing contracts with the WWF.) – with Jeff Hardy
- New England Wrestling Alliance
  - NEWA Heavyweight Championship (1 time)
  - NEWA Hall of Fame (class of 2012)
- New Frontier Wrestling Association
  - NFWA Heavyweight Championship (1 time)
  - NFWA Tag Team Championship (1 time) – with Venom
- NWA 2000
  - NWA 2000 Tag Team Championship (1 time) – with Jeff Hardy
- OMEGA Championship Wrestling
  - OMEGA Heavyweight Championship (2 times)
  - OMEGA Tag Team Championship (2 times) – with Brother Nero/Jeff Hardy
- Pro Wrestling Illustrated
  - Comeback of the Year (2017) with Jeff Hardy
  - Feud of the Year (2005) vs. Edge and Lita
  - Match of the Year (2000) with Jeff Hardy vs. The Dudley Boyz and Edge and Christian in a triangle ladder match at WrestleMania 2000
  - Match of the Year (2001) with Jeff Hardy vs. The Dudley Boyz and Edge and Christian in a Tables, Ladders and Chairs match at WrestleMania X-Seven
  - Tag Team of the Year (2000, 2025) with Jeff Hardy
  - Ranked No. 17 of the top 500 singles wrestlers in the PWI 500 in 2003
- Pro Wrestling Syndicate
  - PWS Heavyweight Championship (1 time)
- Remix Pro Wrestling
  - Remix Pro Tag Team Championship (1 time) – with Facade
- Ring of Honor
  - ROH World Tag Team Championship (1 time) – with Jeff Hardy
  - Holy S*** Moment of the Decade (2010s) – Hardys Show Up, Win ROH World Tag Team Gold – with Jeff Hardy
- Total Nonstop Action Wrestling
  - TNA World Heavyweight Championship (2 times)
  - TNA World Tag Team Championship (5 times) – with Jeff Hardy/Brother Nero
  - TNA World Tag Team Championship Tournament (2015) – with Jeff Hardy
  - TNA World Tag Team Championship #1 Contender Tournament (2014) – with Jeff Hardy
  - TNA Year End Awards (1 time)
    - Tag Team of the Year (2025) – with Jeff Hardy
- Trampoline Wrestling Federation
  - TWF Mid-Atlantic Championship (1 time, inaugural)
- WrestleCade
  - WrestleCade Championship (2 times, inaugural, final)
- Wrestling Observer Newsletter
  - Best Gimmick (2002, 2016)
  - Worst Feud of the Year (2004) with Lita vs. Kane
- World Wrestling Federation/Entertainment/WWE
  - ECW Championship (1 time)
  - WWE United States Championship (1 time)
  - WWF European Championship (1 time)
  - WWF Hardcore Championship (1 time)
  - WWE Cruiserweight Championship (1 time)
  - WWE (Raw) Tag Team Championship (3 times) – with Montel Vontavious Porter (1) Jeff Hardy (1) and Bray Wyatt (1)
  - WWE SmackDown Tag Team Championship (1 time) – with Jeff Hardy
  - WWF/E World Tag Team Championship (6 times) – with Jeff Hardy
  - WCW Tag Team Championship (1 time) – with Jeff Hardy
  - NXT Tag Team Championship (1 time) – with Jeff Hardy
  - Fourth Tag Team Triple Crown Champion – with Jeff Hardy
  - André the Giant Memorial Battle Royal (2018)
  - Bragging Rights Trophy (2009) – with Team SmackDown (Chris Jericho, Kane, R-Truth, Finlay, David Hart Smith and Tyson Kidd)
  - Terri Invitational Tournament (1999) – with Jeff Hardy
  - WWE Tag Team Eliminator (2018) – with Bray Wyatt
- Wrestling Superstar
  - Wrestling Superstar Tag Team Championship (1 time) – with Jeff Hardy

== Luchas de Apuestas record ==
Winner (wager)	Loser (wager)	Location	Event	Date	Notes
Matt Hardy (hair)	Billy Blade (hair)	Santa Maria, California	Terror Rising	October 27, 2012	This was a ladder match.

== Sources ==
- Hardy, Jeff; Hardy, Matt; Krugman, Michael (2003). The Hardy Boyz: Exist 2 Inspire. HarperCollins. ISBN 978-0-06-052154-7.
- Yandek, Chris (August 2003). "Interview: Matt Hardy". Wrestling Digest. Archived from the original on September 26, 2004.
- Varsallone, Jim (December 2001). "Matt and Jeff Hardy – Interview". Wrestling Digest. Archived from the original on February 2, 2007.
