= Count Grog =

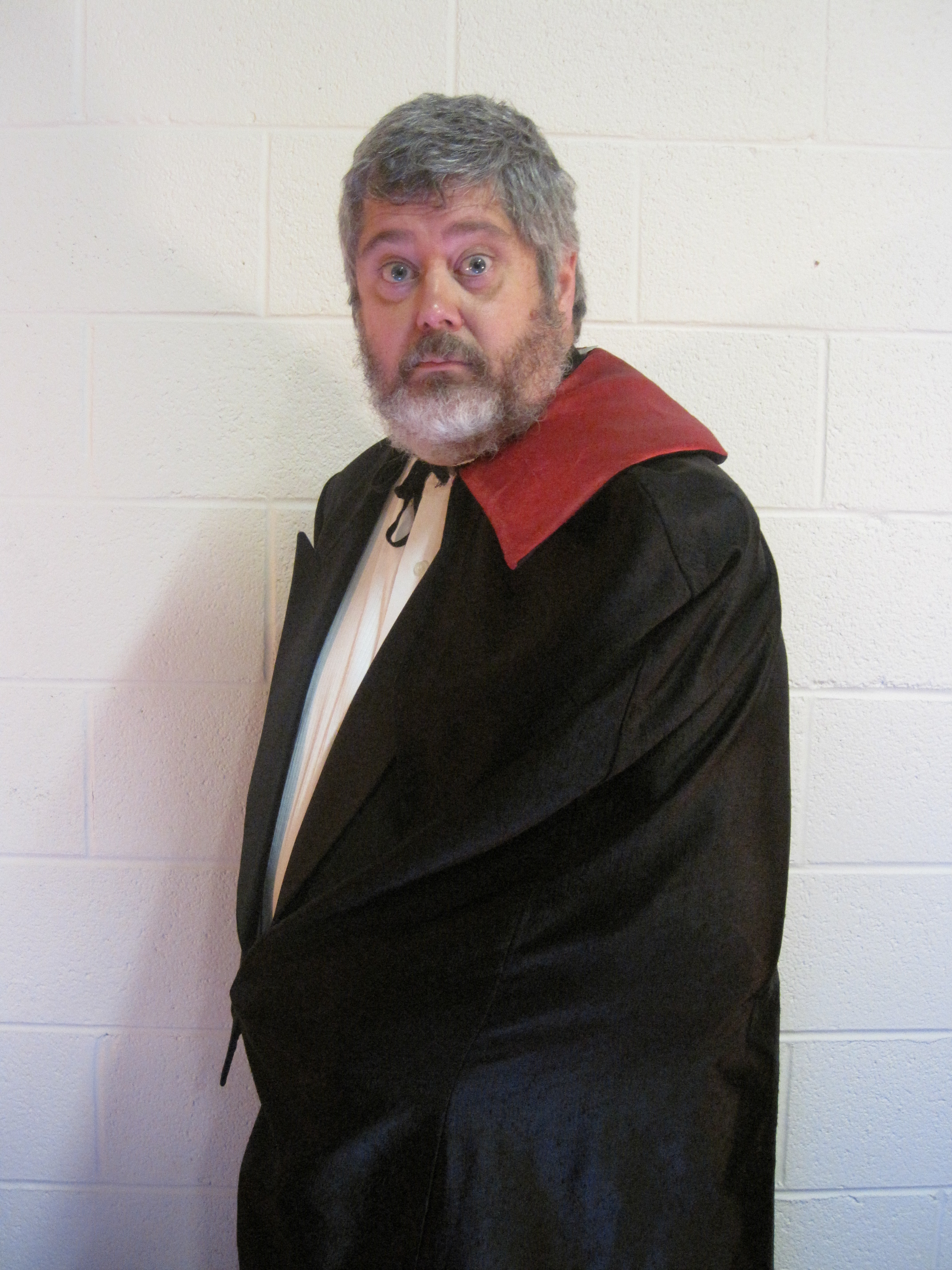

Personal information
- Born: Greg Mosorjak; June 21, 1961 (age 65) Johnstown, Pennsylvania, United States
- Website: Official website

Professional wrestling career
- Ring name(s): Count Grog; Shah of Grog; Greg "Punk Rock" Mason
- Billed height: 5 ft 11 in (1.80 m)
- Billed weight: 225 lb (102 kg)
- Billed from: Carpathian Mountains, Transylvania
- Trained by: Luis Martinez; Mark Curtis
- Debut: 1981

Greg Mosorjak (born June 21, 1961), better known as Count Grog, is an American professional wrestling manager, referee, ring announcer, commentator, promoter, and booker. As a manager, he has worked for Cueball Carmichael's Independent Professional Wrestling Alliance, OMEGA and Southern States Wrestling and from 1994 to 2004, was the owner of Southern Championship Wrestling.

A well-known wrestling personality in the Southeastern United States, especially in the North Carolina independents, he is best remembered for his long-running feud with "Boogie Woogie Man" Jimmy Valiant during the 1990s. He was also the founder and longtime manager of the "heel" stable "The Brotherhood". Initially consisting of Major DeBeers and Boris Dragoff, the group included some of the region's top stars such as "Beastmaster" Rick Link, "Ragin' Bull" Manny Fernandez, K. C. Thunder and Frank "The Tank" Parker. He has been called the "most employee friendly boss around" by Pro Wrestling Illustrated for allegedly frequently turning against his own wrestlers. Mosorjak is currently the promoter and on-screen commissioner for G.O.U.G.E (Gimmicks Only Underground Grappling Entertainment) based in Raleigh, North Carolina.

== Career ==
A native of Johnstown, Pennsylvania, Mosorjak was an early fan of professional wrestling, watching Pittsburgh Studio Wrestling in the mid-1960s, and became "hooked" after attending his first live event, headlined by Bruno Sammartino and Battman versus Prof. Toru Tanaka and Ivan Koloff, in February 1970. Inspired by Ron Dobratz's Illustrated Wrestling Digest, he established his own monthly newsletter called "Inside the Squared Circle", and later "Ringside Seat" with Mark Curtis, while still in high school. These "kayfabe sheets" featured the latest news and results from "the territories" and included reports, monthly recaps, and photos. A number of future wrestling personalities were staff members on Mosorjak's newsletters such as Mark Curtis, Ken Jugan, Norman Dooley, Pete Lederberg, and Elio Zarlenga. Eddie Gilbert and Jim Cornette also worked as photographers. His publications covered not only mainstream wrestling, then the "Big Three" (American Wrestling Alliance, National Wrestling Alliance and the World Wrestling Federation), but covered the leading independents throughout the country. He worked for Pittsburgh promoter Gene Dargen during this period, with duties such as putting up posters and calling in radio shows, where he befriended fellow fans Ken Jugan and Mark Curtis.

In his senior year, Mosorjak started working in various capacities for local independent promotions, both as a referee and manager, under the name Greg "Punk Rock" Mason. His initial training was learned "on the job" as well as assistance from friends Zoltan the Great and Mark Curtis, and Luis Martinez. By 1982, he was a regular referee for Zoltan's 3 Rivers Wrestling, having previously written its programs, and made his managerial debut in CCWA, an independent based in Smithfield, North Carolina. A year later, he started promoting wrestling events as part of West Virginia Championship Wrestling in Morgantown, West Virginia, also appearing in the promotion under his "Punk Rock" persona. Some of his early years in the business was spent touring the Northeast and Southern independents with his first charges, Zoltan the Great and J.W. "Snakeman" Hawk, feuding with Bobo Brazil, Luis Martinez, JR Hogg, and Mike Schulli among other regional stars. It was around this time that he got an opportunity to work for Joseph Blanchard and Southwest Championship Wrestling, however, he was involved in a car accident while traveling with Jugan to a television taping in Kingwood, West Virginia. His injuries, which included a dislocated shoulder, left him unable to appear on the Blanchard shows though he did work matches for The Original Sheik when he toured West Virginia. In 1984, following his graduation from West Virginia University, Mosorjak left pro wrestling to pursue other business and personal interests (while attending WVU he was roommates with the nephew of Farhat). He later claimed that he had also grown frustrated with the industry at the time, working indy shows in Ohio and West Virginia for little to no pay, describing one incident in which he drove 200 miles to work a show and was stiffed by the promoter. Between 1985 and 1992, he attended North Carolina State University at Raleigh and Appalachian State University, graduating with a bachelor's degree in political science from the former institution.

=== Introduction of Count Grog (1993-1994) ===
In 1993, Mosorjak returned to wrestling working primarily in North Carolina as a referee. While in the Carolina Championship Wrestling Alliance, he briefly feuded with television announcer Henry Dean which saw Mosorjak wrestle his first wrestling match which ended in a 10-minute draw. He left refereeing soon afterwards to go back to managing. He made his first appearance as "Count Grog", a Transylvanian nobleman modeled after Count Dracula, on August 19, 1994, at a show for Atlantic Championship Wrestling in Carolina Beach, North Carolina. He eventually left CCWA with his first protege, the Intruder, to start Southern Championship Wrestling in November 1994.

=== Southern Championship Wrestling (1994-1998) ===
Mosorjak began the Southern Championship Wrestling (SCW) promotion in 1994. SCW promoted shows primarily in eastern and central North Carolina, with its home arena at the Kings Barcade in downtown Raleigh and later the historic Dorton Arena. It also had a weekly television show which aired Tuesdays on Channel 6 in Durham, Chapel Hill, and Carrboro, and Saturday mornings on Channel 10 in Raleigh. Among the promotion's mainstays included C. W. Anderson, Caprice Coleman, Cham Pain, Dewey Cheatum, Scab, Natrone Steele, Lazz, Lexie Fyfe, Mickie James, Matt Stryker, Shawn Alexander, Seymour Snott, The Stro, Trailer Park Heat, Venom, The Bad Street Boys (Joey Matthews and Christian York), Dangerous Minds (Toad and Lodi), Death & Destruction (Frank Parker and Roger Anderson), and The Dupps (Bo and Jack Dupp). Future WWE superstars Shane Helms, Shannon Moore, Edge and Christian, Lita and The Hardy Boyz (Matt and Jeff Hardy) also spent their early careers in SCW. The promotion's unique mix of traditional Southern-style 'Rasslin and modern hardcore wrestling attracting Extreme Championship Wrestling's Chilly Willy, Steve Corino, Julio Dinero, New Jack as well as older Mid-Atlantic legends Ivan Koloff, Manny Fernandez, and Jimmy Valiant.

In addition to being the owner, he also continued managing in SCW as "Count Grog". One of his first maneuvers was the formation of a "heel" stable which he called "The Brotherhood". The group initially consisted of Major DeBeers and Boris Dragoff, however, it would eventually include many of the region's top "rulebreakers". On January 7, 1995, under Count Grog's management, Boris Dragoff won a one-night championship tournament in Creedmoor, North Carolina, to crown the first SCW Heavyweight Champion. A year later, he helped the Dream Team (Billy Simmons and Sean Powers) in winning the SCW tag team titles from The Rat Pack (Jimmy Cicero and Brian Perry) though they refused Grog's invitation to become a part of The Brotherhood. Another tag team he would manage to the titles was Death & Destruction (Frank Parker and Roger Anderson) and during their feud with the Serial Thrillaz (Shane Helms & Mike Maverick) and Thug Life (Christian Cage and Sexton Hardcastle).

Over the next two years, he led Brotherhood members Gorgeous George III to the SCW Heavyweight title (November 1996) and K. C. Thunder to the North Carolina Heavyweight title (February 1997), who defeated Big Slam in a tournament final to become the promotion's first-ever champion. On June 27, 1998, he again led Dragoff to recapture SCW title, and persuaded Boris Dragoff to rejoin the Brotherhood, who had left the previous year. Five months later, on November 21, 1998, he helped Cueball Carmichael win the vacant SCW Heavyweight Championship from Big Slam, then substituting for an injured James "Poison" Ivey, in Louisburg, North Carolina. Club Security (Rumble and Rukkus) captured the SCW Tag Team titles from Pat & C. W. Anderson and Otto Schwanz the North Carolina title, with assistance from Mosorjak, making it one of The Brotherhood's most successful years.

=== Independent circuit (1998-2000) ===
While promoting SCW, Mosorjak and The Brotherhood also toured the Southern independent circuit with many of his wrestlers, most especially Major DeBeers, have won titles in most of the promotions they visited. At its height, The Brotherhood consisted of Major DeBeers, Boris Dragoff, "Beastmaster" Rick Link, "Ragin' Bull" Manny Fernandez, K. C. Thunder and Frank "The Tank" Parker. By the end of the decade, the group had appeared in every major independent organization in North Carolina as well as in South Carolina, Virginia, Tennessee, West Virginia, Pennsylvania, Ohio, and New York. It was during this time that Mosorjak engaged in a long-running feud with "Boogie Woogie Man" Jimmy Valiant which set attendance records in historic wrestling towns such as Fall Branch, Tennessee, to Butner, North Carolina. On at least one occasion, Valiant managed to get his hands on Mosorjak during a Southern States Wrestling show, on December 9, 1995, defeating him in a "5-minute challenge" match.

Mosorjak himself, a "hands on" manager who frequently involved himself in his wrestler's matches, used such tactics as throwing fire at opponents as well as "opening up foreheads with his razor sharp teeth". In the summer of 1996, he and Major DeBeers were suspended from the Great American Wrestling Federation after Grog threw a fireball at DeBeers' opponent "Iceman" Mike Murphy. He was by voted by fans as "Manager of the Year" in SCW and Southern States Wrestling in 1997, and in 1999 by Norm Kietzer's The Wrestling News magazine for the North Carolina independents. That same year, Pro Wrestling Illustrated called Count Grog the "least employee friendly boss around", due to his tendency of double-crossing his own wrestlers. Since forming the group, Mosorjak has twice turned on Major DeBeers, Boris Dragoff, Otto Schwanz, Jimmy Cicero, and Venom, though many eventually rejoined the group.

He also took part in wrestling matches on occasion though this was usually for comic effect. For example, at an ICW show in Yanceyville, North Carolina, Skinhead #1 chose Count Grog as his tag team partner to defend the ICW Tag Team Championship. Later that night, their opponents Heartbreak Express pinned Grog to win the titles. In the fall of 1998, he also wrestled midget wrestler Sweetie Pop in a special challenge match in Raleigh.

An active manager in OMEGA, Mosorjak managed Christian York to the OMEGA Junior Heavyweight Championship fought in a four-way match involving Joey Matthews, Caprice Coleman and Shannon Moore. He managed many of these younger stars in his own promotion, most notably, when Shane Helms defeated Otto Schwanz for the SCW title on November 29, 1999, in Raleigh. Mosorjak's cross-promotional activities with the Hardys, which included championship titles being both recognized and defended in both promotions, continued up until OMEGA's close that same year.

=== Southern Championship Wrestling (2000-2004) ===
Over the next two years, due to his independent appearances and responsibilities running SCW, Mosorjak gradually began to limit his on-screen appearances in the promotion. On February 22, 2001, he defeated Anthony Overdrive for the SCW Brass Knuckles Championship, mimicking the 24/7 rule of the WWF Hardcore Championship, before immediately losing the belt to Justin Drive. The title change took place during a "New Jersey Drive" match in which the title could change hands multiple times within a 10-min. period. As Count Grog, he met Drive in a wrestling match several months later pinned him to win SCW Hardcore Championship on October 25, 2001. He made his final appearance as "Count Grog" on November 18, 2001, successfully defending the Brass Knuckles title against Duke Richards, Rico Rage, Hashim Ali, and Trailer Park Heat at Cat's Cradle in Chapel Hill, North Carolina. In the main event later that night, he once more managed Major DeBeers to the SCW title, in what would also be DeBeers' retirement match.

Mosorjak's retirement lasted less than three months when, on March 1, 2002, he made his return to SCW in Louisburg, North Carolina. He continued managing the Brotherhood up until the promotion's close two years later. On its final event, November 20's "Blowout Bash", Count Grog led Otto Schwanz to victory over C. W. Anderson to become the last SCW Heavyweight Champion title, and afterwards went into retirement. Lexie Fyfe, who had gotten her start in SCW, was among the former stars who returned for its last show.

=== Semi-retirement (2004-2005) ===
Mosorjak spent the next year or two in employed in educational research though he sometimes made the occasional show for local promotions. On May 7, 2005, "Count Grog" returned for a special one-night appearance for the Mark Curtis Memorial Show in Johnson City, Tennessee.

=== G.O.U.G.E. (2006-) ===
A year later, Mosorjak decided to start a second promotion, G.O.U.G.E. (Gimmicks Only Underground Grappling Entertainment), out of Raleigh's Kings Barcade once more. After Kings was torn down, GOUGE made Vintage 21 its new home arena. Unlike the SCW, the new promotion presented more comedy-based "family friendly" satire of hardcore wrestling. Mosorjak has compared it to the American version of HUSTLE. He continued appearing as "Count Grog" reforming a new version of "The Brotherhood" with Major DeBeers, Scab, and Chilly Willy and a later stable consisting of "Beef Stew" Lou Marconi and Bad Romance (Mickey Gambino and Frank Stalletto). He was involved in several memorable angles including:

- On its debut show, held on April 19, 2006, Mosorjak introduced a blind man, Stevie Charles, a play on blind musicians Stevie Wonder and Ray Charles, to serve as the promotion's new commissioner.
- Throughout the promotion's first year, he impersonated famous managers such as Captain Grog Albano (Captain Lou Albano), Sir Oliver Humper Grog (Sir Oliver Humperdink), Grog E. Cornette (James E. Cornette, Grog E. Dangerously (Paul E. Dangerously), Coach Grog Tolos (Coach John Tolos), and Playboy Groggy Hart ("Playboy" Gary Hart), before returning to managing as "Count Grog". Commissioner Charles warned Grog to stop these antics and, at one point, during a Raleigh house show on April 14, 2007, he ordered that if any of Grog's men lost their matches he would have to stop using the gimmick.
- At GOUGE's "Glory Bowl" show on September 15, 2007, Grog helped Wallabee Joe win an intergender match against Felicia O by rendering her unconscious with a rag full of ether. Later on the show, he wrestled a match against Seymour Snott who knocked him out using a sleeper hold. Two months later, he and Joe abducted Cinnamon Snott during her match against Naudia, again using ether to knock her out, and carried her backstage.
- On January 12, 2008, Grog turned on Wallabee Joe at "The Redneck Rumble" in Allensville, North Carolina, during a match against Scab. He hit Joe with a fireball, temporarily blinding the champion, allowing Scab to pin him for the title. This started a short-lived feud which ended at the "Winter Wars" supercard two weeks later with Wallabee Joe regaining the title from Scab and forcing him to leave GOUGE permanently. This ultimately saw the end of "The Brotherhood" as a force in the promotion.
- At GOUGE's 2nd Anniversary Show, Count Grog was in "King" Chilly Willy's corner during his match against ex-Brotherhood member Otto Schwanz. Due to the pre-match stipulations, Willy was never able to use the ring name again.
- On May 3, 2008, at a GOUGE benefit show for The Iron Horse in Apex, North Carolina, the "Kyle Petty's Victory Junction Fundraiser", Count Grog helped Major DeBeers win his match against Tater in the main event and helped shave him bald afterwards.
- On May 30, 2008, during a hardcore match between Major DeBeers and Wallabee Joe for the North Carolina Championship, Count Grog went to hit champion with a traffic sign but accidentally struck a member of the audience, Crystal Lloyd. The following week, he was forced by then GOUGE commissioner David Blanchard to apologize to the longtime fan. He threw a birthday party for her but then pushed the birthday cake in her face. At the end of the night, following his match with Prince Kofi Jabba against Wallabee Joe, Commissioner Blanchard suspended Grog for 50 days. Two weeks later, Grog attempted to attend a GOUGE show at Raleigh's Vintage 21 but was spotted sitting in the crowd by Wallabee Joe and was escorted from the building by security. At the "2 Hot 2 Handle" supercard on August 9, Grog managed Sean Cruise against Wallabee Joe, with Crystal Lloyd in his corner, with Grog and Cruise being on the losing end.

Mosorjak also continued making appearances on the Carolinas "indy circuit". On February 2, 2008, during a handicap match pitting Rick Link against Scrap Yard Dog and Dick Foley for Alternative Championship Wrestling's "Night of Legends", he engineered a "swerve" by convincing "The Perfect Ten" Baby Doll, their opponent's manager, to desert her team during the match and allowing Link to win the match. That same month, he was a guest on the internet radio series In Your Head! Wrestling Radio. During the show, he discussed writing with Mark Curtus, Paul Heyman, Jim Cornette on his newsletter, stories of The Original Sheik, Bobo Brazil, and others during the 1980s, and promoting SCW and GOUGE. Similarly, he was also interviewed on the August 21st 2009 edition of Carolina Wrestling Radio. He discussed the promotion's history, the general state in independent wrestling, and running interpromotional events with other local North Carolina organizations. Mosorjak also recalled a recent match he took part in, at the 7th Annual Seagrove SuperShow, between Otto Schwanz and Jerry "The King" Lawler with Jimmy Valiant as the special guest referee. When he climbed in to the ring to interfere, he was put in the sleeper hold by Valiant and dropkicked by Lawler over the top rope following the end of the match.

He has been a regular performer at Deaf Wrestlefest, an annual benefit show for the Western Pennsylvania School for the Deaf, managing Lou Marconi, Frank Staletto, and J. J. Dillon against Dominic DeNucci, Cody Michaels, and Shane Douglas with Missy Hyatt (2009), Marconi and Staletto against David Sammartino and Larry Zbyszko (2010), and Staletto against Patrick Hayes (2011).

On May 21, 2011, Mosorjak announced at the "Mayhem at Butner" supercard that he would be retiring from managing to take on the role of the promotion's new commissioner. He subsequently turned over control of his stable to manager Andre Adonisy at the June 25th "Born to be GOUGED" show in Apex, North Carolina.

== Internet writings ==
=== Involvement in the "internet wrestling community" ===
A wrestling newsletter writer early in his career, Mosorjak became very active in the internet wrestling community during the late 1990s and 2000s. He was one of the first promoters to create an official website for the promotion as early as 2000, and contributed to Pro Wrestling Torch. He went as far as to reference "smart marks" while traveling the independent circuit. During a show for Cueball Carmichael's Independent Pro Wrestling Alliance in Woodbridge, Virginia, he delivered a worked shoot against Lee Morey, known by her internet alias "The Dark Cheetah", of OtherArena.com. He was also critical of flame wars which occurred on internet forums between independent workers and fans, and strictly prohibited SCW wrestlers from participating.

During his years in semi-retirement, and while promoting GOUGE Wrestling, Mosorjak often interacted with fans on NWAlegends.com, SportsandWrestling.com, and WrestlingClassics.com. He not only discussed his thoughts on the wrestling industry, and shared road stories from his career, but talked about current events and pop culture. In January 2011, he also informed fans of health issues he was experiencing.

=== Work as a wrestling historian and researcher ===
Mosorjak also used his background in education to become a prominent wrestling historian and researcher. In 2006, he and Steve Johnson started SteelBeltWrestling.com which examined the history of pro wrestling in Buffalo, New York, Pittsburgh, Pennsylvania, and Cleveland, Ohio, and its intermingling histories, during the 1970s; he conducted an interview with George "The Animal" Steele as part of his work. He wrote about this subject for KayfabeMemories.com as well as contributing to the research of the Toronto wrestling territory in the same period.

In early-2007, Mosorjak announced that he was attempting to compile the first complete record book for Wahoo McDaniel which was later published on MidAtlanticGateway.com two years later; he also assisted in researching its match records for "The Nature Boy" Buddy Rogers as well.

In recent years, Mosorjak has been a guest columnist for the Canadian Online Explorer and OnlineWorldofWrestling.com reporting on major wrestling events such as the 2008 Pro Wrestling Hall of Fame and the 2010 NWA Wrestling Legends Fan Fest as well as contributing a number of book reviews

== Championships and accomplishments ==
- Southern Championship Wrestling
  - SCW Brass Knuckles Championship (2 times)
  - SCW Hardcore Championship (1 time)
  - SCW Hall of Fame (Class of 2001)
  - Manager of the Year (1997)
- Southern States Wrestling
  - Manager of the Year (1997)
- Wrestling News
  - Manager of the Year (1999)
- Other titles
  - ICW Tag Team Championship (1 time) - with Skinhead #1
