= Rick Link =

American professional wrestler (1959–2026)

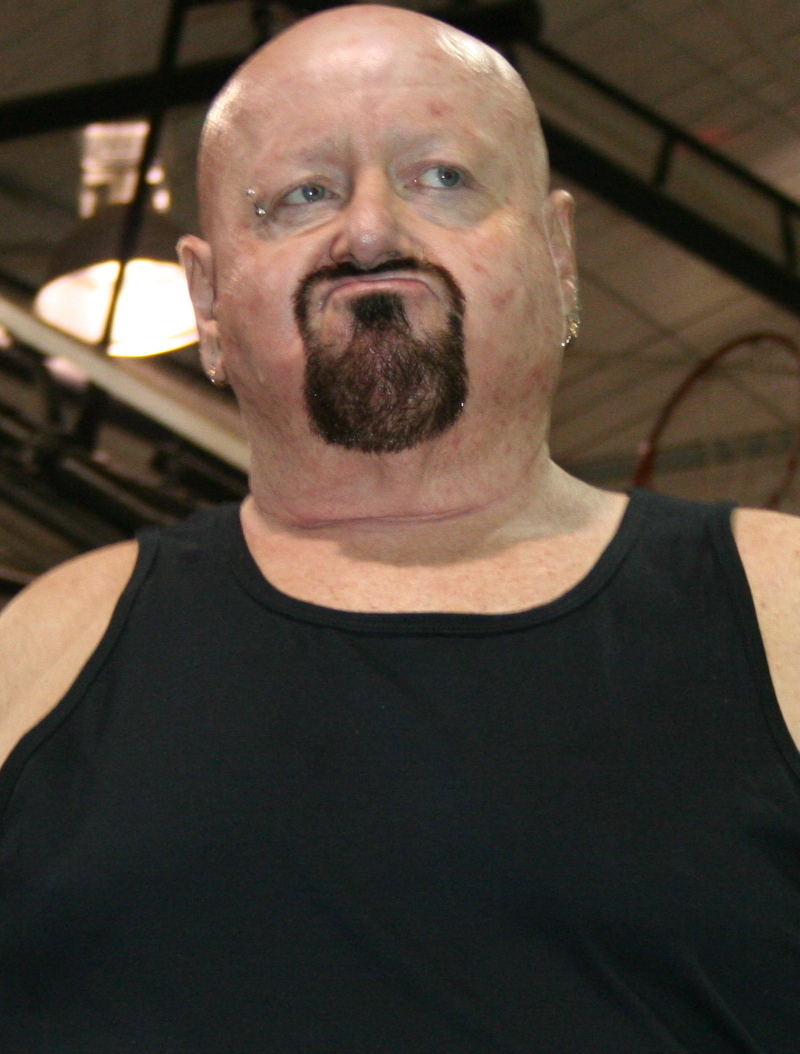
- Link in 2013

Personal information
- Born: Richard Link; February 28, 1959 Lexington, North Carolina, U.S.
- Died: January 14, 2026 (aged 66)
- Website: Official website

Professional wrestling career
- Ring name(s): Rick Link; Man Mountain Link; The Man Mountain; Sir Rickton Link; Man Eating Beast; Squasher Link; The Beastmaster
- Billed height: 6 ft 3 in (1.90 m)
- Billed weight: 348 lb (158 kg)
- Trained by: Johnny Hunter
- Debut: March 1, 1975
- Retired: 2023

Richard Link (February 28, 1959 – January 14, 2026) was an American professional wrestler, trainer and promoter. He wrestled throughout Canada and the United States for the National Wrestling Alliance during the 1970s and 1980s under a number of ring names, most notably, as M.E.B. (Man Eating Beast) in NWA Central States and as Man Mountain Link in the Continental Wrestling Association where he was among the "monster heels" who challenged AWA Southern Heavyweight Champion Jerry "The King" Lawler and was involved in the ongoing feud between Lawler and Andy Kaufman. Other promotions Link competed in included Georgia Championship Wrestling, International Championship Wrestling, the International Wrestling Association, Jim Crockett Promotions, and Stampede Wrestling. He was also part of the NWA's 1983 visit to New Zealand, frequently appearing on the country's long-running wrestling programme On the Mat, and remained undefeated throughout the tour.

Following the end of the NWA territory system, Link relocated to his native North Carolina where he became a trainer and promoter of independent wrestling in the Southeastern United States. It was on the independent circuit that he reinvented himself as a formidable "hardcore" wrestler and engaged in bloody brawls with Abdullah the Butcher, The Iron Sheik, Buddy Landel, Jimmy Valiant and Wahoo McDaniel. He was also long billed as "World Brass Knuckles Champion" in his home state. From the 1990s, he was associated with Alternative Championship Wrestling, Carolina Championship Wrestling, Coastal Championship Wrestling, New Age Championship Wrestling and New Dimension Wrestling, the latter promotion associated with his Piedmont Triad wrestling school, the TNT Training Center. In later years, he appeared with other NWA territorial veterans of the Carolinas such as Bobby Eaton, The Barbarian, Ivan Koloff, Bobby Fulton, Jimmy Valiant, Tommy Young and The Rock 'n' Roll Express (Ricky Morton and Robert Gibson).

== Professional wrestling career ==
A North Carolina native, Rick Link became a fan of professional wrestling at a young age and was the president of the Ron Garvin Fan Club in his teens. One Man Gang was also one of his childhood friends while growing up in the Carolinas. Link started training to become a pro wrestler at the age of 15. He was taught by Johnny Hunter, an older NWA veteran who also trained Ken Spence and George South, who set up a ring in Link's backyard and worked out with the teenager 7 days a week unless Hunter was on the road. The training conditions, according to Link, were "brutal" as the two wrestled "stiff" and regardless of "whether it was freezing or it was in 100 degree heat". The lessons learned from Hunter, that hardship would teach students to have a love and old-school respect for the business, would carry over as a trainer years later.

=== Early career ===
After about six months of training, Link made his pro debut on March 1, 1975, one day after his 16th birthday. He spent the first few years of his career wrestling for local North Carolina–based independent promotions such as Johnny Hunter's Eastern Wrestling Association. During his rookie year, Link joined up with the International Wrestling Association, an "outlaw" promotion run by Johnny Powers which competed against Jim Crockett Promotions in the Carolinas during the 1970s. He appeared in televised matches for well over a year against wrestlers such as Bulldog Brower, The Love Brothers, Don Fargo, Buddy Austin, Killer Karl Krupp and Karl Von Stronheim. Link later credited these men for giving him valuable experience during his early career though, he joked in a later interview that "it took a few months of getting stretched before they warmed to me".

=== Wrestling for the NWA and ICW ===
In 1979, Link began wrestling for the National Wrestling Alliance in Atlanta, Georgia. He initially worked for Ernie Ladd and later Georgia Championship Wrestling bookers George Scott and Buck Robley through 1980–1981. Link was then brought into Angelo Poffo's International Championship Wrestling by his son "Macho Man" Randy Savage and took part in TV tapings with Angelo and Lanny Poffo, Ronnie Garvin, Ox Baker, Rip Rogers, Pez Whatley, and The Samoans (Tio and Tapu) during 1982.

=== International tours to the Caribbean and South Pacific ===
Later that year, Link left the United States for Stu Hart's Stampede Wrestling in Calgary, Alberta and accompanied the promotion on its first-ever Caribbean tour in Antigua and Montserrat in the West Indies where he wrestled Bret Hart, "Dr. D" David Schultz, Gama Singh and JR Foley. He also joined the NWA on a major tour of New Zealand in 1983. He was among the many foreign wrestlers to appear on the country's long-running wrestling programme On the Mat and whose opponents included Lars Anderson, Mark Lewin, Curt Kummala and Steve Rickard. He initially arrived as a "heel" wrestler, offering $1000 to anyone who could bodyslam him and challenged local wrestlers to handicap matches, but later "turned face" to feud with the Mongols, Zar & Gor. One of his most memorable matches from this period was a 6-man tag team match with Ricky Rickard and Mark Lewin against Butcher Branigan, Jos LeDuc & "Brutal" Bob Miller. While in New Zealand, the 24-year-old Link and then NWA World Heavyweight Champion Ric Flair celebrated their birthdays together, Flair's 34th birthday being three days before his, along with Steve Rickard. Link also worked in Tonga, Samoa and Hawaii for Lia Maivia during his New Zealand tour. The King of Tonga, Taufa'ahau Tupou IV, was in attendance during one of his matches. Years later, Link became the first wrestler to appear in New Zealand cartoonist Jason Conlan's "On The Mat" comic strip for Pro Wrestling Illustrated. He was also interviewed by Kiwi Pro Wrestling, one of New Zealand's three major wrestling companies, which was later posted on their website.

=== From Memphis to Kansas City ===
Link returned to the US in the summer of 1983 and spent most of the decade wrestling for promoter Jerry Jarrett in Memphis, Tennessee and NWA Central States promoters Harley Race, Pat O'Connor and Bob Geigel in Kansas City, Missouri. He first arrived in the Continental Wrestling Association as one of the "monster heels", such as Jos LeDuc, the Mongolian Stomper, Kamala, King Kong Bundy and André the Giant, brought to Memphis to challenge Jerry "The King" Lawler for the AWA Southern Heavyweight Championship. Link was managed by Jimmy Hart during his first run in the territory and whose "gimmick" included eating a raw chicken walking to the ring or during interviews. Hart later claimed that Link was probably his least favourite wrestler to manage because of this eccentricity. Link fared better than prior opponents defeating Lawler for the title at the Mid-South Coliseum in Memphis on June 20, 1983, ending Lawler's 25th reign. He and Lawler traded the title during the feud before losing the title back to Lawler three weeks later for a second a final time; Link's victories made him one of the first men to pin Lawler two consecutive weeks in a row at the Mid-South Coliseum. That same night, he took part in a 10-man tag team match with Dream Machine, Porkchop Cash and The Grapplers (Grappler #1 and Grappler #2) against Steve Regal, Spike Huber, Mad Dog and The Rock 'n' Roll Express (Ricky Morton and Robert Gibson).

"It was one of my early teen birthdays, and I got to pick what activity the family did. I don't believe Man Mountain Link ever went on to do anything major in his life, but his shtick was being huge and walking to the ring eating a whole, uncooked chicken. ... The entertainment came from my mom's reaction to the cascade of chicken parts that were indiscriminately flying through the air. She was as close to getting publicly ill as I had ever seen, which, to a young teenage boy, is priceless."

— Jason "MonkeyBoy" Phillips, Lexington Herald-Leader (July 8, 2010)

The Link-Lawler feud was immensely popular with wrestling fans at the time partly due to the connections with the ongoing rivalry between Lawler and Andy Kaufman. Jason "MonkeyBoy" Phillips, a disc jockey for WKQQ-100.1 FM, has claimed that his all-time favourite match was between Man Mountain Link and Jerry Lawler at Louisville Gardens. On June 27, 1983, Link and Ken Patera challenged Jerry Lawler to a tag team match at the Mid-South Coliseum in which Lawler would get a rematch with Kaufman if he managed to pin Patera in the match. Lawler's surprise tag team partner was eventually revealed to be longtime enemy Austin Idol with the two later going on to defeat Link and Patera in front of nearly 7,000 fans. On July 11, he and Duke Myers lost to The Rock 'n' Roll Express and on July 18 the two took part in a 10-man elimination match with Don Anderson, Tommy Gilbert, Spike Huber, Mad Dog, Sweet Daddy O, Tom Prichard, Ken Timbs and the eventual winner The Giant Rebel. The end of his first stint in the Memphis territory came a week later with his defeat by Stagger Lee in a "loser leaves town" match.

Through Link made a one-time "Halloween" appearance for a six-man tag team match with The Moondogs (Rex and Spot), fighting to a no-contest in a "falls count anywhere" match with Jerry Lawler, Austin Idol and Dutch Mantel, he spent the next few months wrestling in NWA Central States under the name M.E.B. (Man Eating Beast). In early 1984, under the management of Sheik Abdullah The Great, he feuded with Art Crews over the NWA Central States Television Championship. After a brief absence, he returned on June 14 and easily defeated Mike Pagal. Following the match, Link and Sheik Abdullah attacked Art Crews and stole the TV belt. Link briefly held on to the title but Crews managed to regain it at a house show soon afterwards. He managed to win the TV championship in an official match before losing the title back to Crews that same year. While in the territory, Link also won the NWA Central States Tag Team Championship with "Triple 6" Jim Star defeating Buzz Sawyer and "Bulldog" Bob Brown.

That summer, Link returned to Memphis where he resumed his feud with Jerry Lawler. In July 1985, he was awarded the NWA Mid-America Heavyweight Championship and lost the title to Lawler at the Mid-South Coliseum that same month. On July 22, he lost to Jerry Oski, Tojo Yamamoto and Jerry Jarrett in a 6-man tag team match with The Spoiler and Jerry Bryant. He and Bryant lost a tag team match to Yamamoto and Jarrett via disqualification the following week. In August, Link faced off in singles competition against Tracy Smothers and Yamamoto. Link would have a few more stints in Memphis over the next two years. On September 20, 1986, he was enlisted by Larry Sharpe in a tag team match against former student Bam Bam Bigelow and Jerry Lawler. Bigelow had turned against his former manager, becoming a "babyface" in the process, and teamed with Lawler on his last night in the territory. His final CWA appearance was a tag team match with Larry Wright against Ric McCord & John Paul at the Mid-South Coliseum on October 13, 1986.

=== Transition to the independent circuit ===
As the traditional NWA territory system began to decline during the mid-to late 1980s, Link's wrestling appearances grew more sporadic as Vince McMahon and the World Wrestling Federation began its national expansion. In October 1986, he and female wrestler Debbie Combs were among the celebrities who attended the 6th-annual WaxWorks/Videoworks trade show in Owensboro, Kentucky. Finding work outside the U.S., he made a return appearance to Canada where, using the name Squasher Link, he lost to Gerry Morrow in Edmonton, Alberta on April 4, 1987. With the close of NWA Central States in 1988, as well as the dissolution of the old CWA Memphis territory the following year, Link returned to North Carolina where he spent the next few years as a trainer and working with local promoters. He also started competing under his real name "The Beastmaster" Rick Link and made appearances for independent promotions up and down the Eastern seaboard.

By the mid-1990s, Link had gained a new generation of fans through "hardcore"-wrestling style matches against Abdullah the Butcher, the Iron Sheik, Buddy Landel, Chuck Coates, Jimmy Valiant and Wahoo McDaniel. He eventually headlined countless regional promotions performing in a series of thumbtack death matches and had memorable bouts against Major DeBeers, Dirty White Boy" Tony Anthony, Justin Feeche and his student King Konga. Among the promotions he was involved with included Alternative Championship Wrestling and Chris Plano's New Dimension Wrestling. In October 1997, Link feuded Ken Spence, a fellow student of his trainer Johnny Hunter, over the NDW Heavyweight Championship in a series of "bloody" steel cage matches.

On July 17, 1998, Link headlined a New Dimension Wrestling (NDW) super card with Buddy Landel, Tully Blanchard, "Superfly" Jimmy Snuka, the Iron Sheik, "Mr. USA" Tony Atlas, One Man Gang and Abdullah the Butcher at the Motor Sport Park in Concord, North Carolina. He and Abdullah wrestled in a "hardcore" match on the undercard for Link's Brass Knuckles title. His opponent used a fork against him during the match which eventually ended in a no-contest. Link also feuded with The Iron Sheik, Kamala II and ex-World Championship Wrestling commentator Chris Cruise over the title.

Though he lost the title to "Raging Bull" Manny Fernandez in Thomasville, North Carolina on December 3, 1998, Link won it back in Burlington on December 12. Two weeks later, he and Fernandez wrestled to a double countout on an Eastern States Wrestling show at the International Agri-Center in Hamburg, New York. At the end of the month, he and Fernandez joined forces in Link's feud with The Dream Warriors defeating them in a tag team match in Thomasville on December 26, 1998. The following year, on May 15, 1999, Link successfully defended the NDW Brass Knuckles Championship against Fernandez at the Break The Barrier super card at Philadelphia's Viking Hall. In August 2002, he and Willie Clay became the head instructors at New Dimension Wrestling's new indoor wrestling school in Concord.

He was also a regular in Southern Championship Wrestling, which helped produce future WWE superstars Shane Helms, Joey Matthews, Shannon Moore and the Hardy Boyz, where he was part of manager Count Grog's "heel" stable The Brotherhood with Major DeBeers, Boris Dragoff, Manny Fernandez, K. C. Thunder and Frank Parker. A one-time holder of both the SCW North Carolina Heavyweight and Brass Knuckles Championship Trophy, Link was among the wrestlers who appeared at the final SCW show, a joint inter-promotional super card with Travis Bradshaw's Vanguard Championship Wrestling, held in Bedford, Virginia on October 30, 2004.

=== Reunion appearances with NWA stars ===
From the early-2000s, Link also made appearances with old NWA veterans of the Carolinas in various independent promotions such as Willie Clay's Carolina Championship Wrestling and World Class Extreme Wrestling. On October 14, 2006, he and Ivan Koloff headlined Carolina Wrestling Entertainment's "Revolution Rumble" super card at the Ray Street Gym in Graham, North Carolina wrestling in a Russian chain match. As the self-proclaimed "World's Brass Knuckle Champion", he beat "The Cowboy" Cletus Bass "to a bloody mess" during their match at a CWE show on March 24, 2007, while CWE Revolution Champion Aaron Devil watched from ringside. The match had been put together at the last minute by CWE Commissioner Richie Blaisdell as a punishment for Bass for "sticking his nose in his business". Link and Willie Watts represented CWE at the 3-day 2007 NWA Wrestling Legends Fanfest at the Hilton University Place Hotel in Charlotte, North Carolina from August 10–12, 2007.

=== Later years ===
In later years, Link wrestled for Alternative Championship Wrestling and Gimmicks Only Underground Grappling Entertainment (GOUGE). On February 2, 2008, Link defeated Scrap Yard Dog & Dick Foley in a handicap match at Alternative Championship Wrestling's Night of Legends in Seagrove, North Carolina. Link won the match when Baby Doll, Foley's valet, turned against him and joined with Link and his manager Count Grog. At the GOUGE super card "March Mayhem" in Youngsville, North Carolina, Count Grog allowed Stevie Charles and Nicky Richards to manage Link for one night only against Eskimo Joe later that night. In exchange, Charles agreed to appear at GOUGE's second anniversary show in Raleigh, North Carolina in a "gimmick" of Grog's choosing which was revealed to be dressing up in drag. Link later defeated Eskimo Joe after Link hit his opponent with a fireball.

One year later, on January 31, 2009, Link was among the many independent wrestlers who performed at the 7th-annual Seagrove Supershow, co-promoted by ACW and GOUGE, which included George South, Malia Hosaka, Brandi Wine, Scrap Yard Dog, Ric Converse, Lumbee Warrior, Rob Killjoy, Semour Snott, Count Grog, Cowboy Willie Watts, Leroy Green and Otto Schwanz. The event, called "A Night with the King", was headlined by his old Memphis arch-rival Jerry "The King" Lawler and held at the local Seagrove Elementary School as a fundraiser for the Randolph County Knockouts. Two weeks later, Link (with Count Grog) beat Scapyard Dog in a dog collar match at the GOUGE vs. ACW Legends Super Show in Seagrove. The show was also held as a memorial to ACW promoter Jerry McNeil. On April 4, he and Major DeBeers wrestled Dick Foley & Mudd Face (Scotty Matthews) at GOUGE's "Final Countdown". This was the last pro wrestling show held at Kings Barcade before being torn down later that year.

== Death ==
Link died on January 14, 2026, at the age of 66.

== Championships and accomplishments ==
- Alternative Championship Wrestling
  - ACW Heavyweight Championship (2 times)
- Atlantic Coast Championship Wrestling
  - ACCW World Tag Team Championship (1 time)
- Big Time Promotions
  - Big Time Television Championship (1 time)
- Black Diamond Pro Wrestling
  - BDPW Hardcore Championship (1 time)
- NWA Mid-America / Continental Wrestling Association / Championship Wrestling Association
  - AWA Southern Heavyweight Championship (2 times)
  - NWA Mid-America Heavyweight Championship (1 time)
- Eastern Wrestling Association
  - EWA United States Brass Knuckles Championship (2 times)
  - EWA Southern Heavyweight Championship (1 time)
  - EWA Southern Tag Team Championship (1 time) - with Johnny Hunter
  - EWA Rookie of the Year (1975)
- International Wrestling Association
  - IWA Southern Tag Team Championship (1 time) – with Jack Daniels
- NWA Central States
  - NWA Central States Television Championship (1 time)
  - NWA Central States Tag Team Championship (1 time) – with Jim Starr
- New Dimension Wrestling
  - NDW Heavyweight Championship (1 time)
  - NDW Brass Knuckles Championship (2 times)
  - NDW Wrestler of the Year (1997)
  - NDW Wrestler of the Year (1998)
- North American Wrestling Alliance
  - NAWA Brass Knuckles Championship (1 time)
- Pro Wrestling Illustrated
  - PWI ranked him # 430 of the 500 best singles wrestlers of the PWI 500 in 1999
  - PWI ranked him # 341 of the 500 best singles wrestlers of the PWI 500 in 1997
- Southern Championship Wrestling
  - SCW North Carolina Heavyweight Championship (1 time)
  - SCW Brass Knuckles Championship Trophy (1 time)
- Other promotions
  - ACWN heavyweight Championship (3 times)
  - CCW Brass Knuckles Championship (1 time)
  - IWA World Tag Team Championship (1 time)
  - NOW World Heavyweight Championship (1 time)
  - SCWN Heavyweight Championship (1 time)
  - UWF World Tag Team Championship (1 time) - with Abdullah the Butcher
