= SCW North Carolina Championship =

Professional wrestling championship

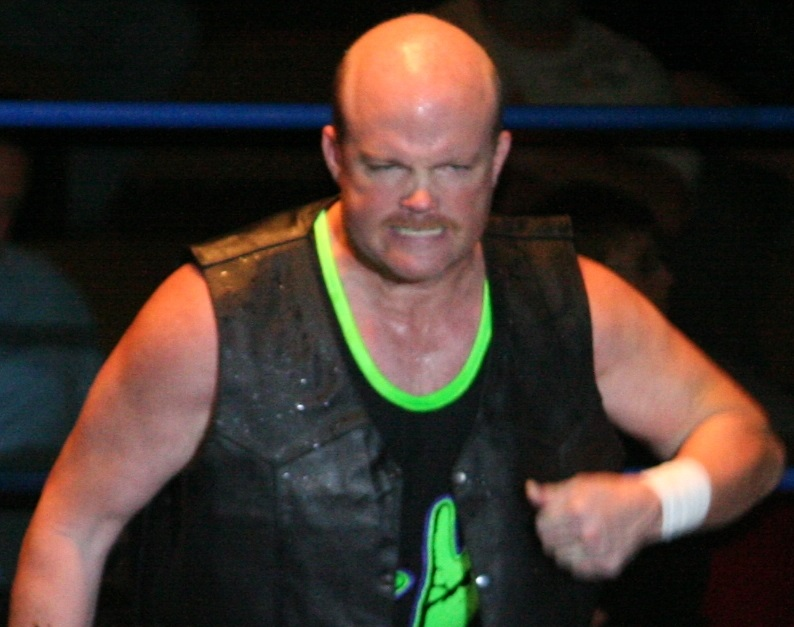
- C. W. Anderson is a former SCW North Carolina Champion.

Details
- Promotion: Southern Championship Wrestling
- Date established: February 22, 1997
- Date retired: November 20, 2004
Statistics
- First champion(s): K. C. Thunder
- Final champion(s): Otto Schwanz
- Most reigns: C. W. Anderson (2); Otto Schwanz (2); Juice (2)
- Longest reign: Seymour Snott (995 days)
- Shortest reign: Rick Link (14 days)

The SCW North Carolina Championship was a professional wrestling regional championship in Southern Championship Wrestling (SCW). It remained active until November 20, 2004, when SCW was closed.

The title was briefly revived in G.O.U.G.E. Wrestling, the successor of SCW, when Nicky Richards was presented the title by his manager Brad Stutts following his victory over The Goat at the GOUGE supercard "Fallout" on October 17, 2008. Count Grog, founder of both SCW and GOUGE, expressed the hope that the old North Carolina title would become a true regional title by being defended in the major "indy" promotions in North Carolina.

The inaugural champion was K. C. Thunder, who defeated Big Slam in a tournament final on February 22, 1997, to become the first SCW Heavyweight Champion. C. W. Anderson, Otto Schwanz, and Juice Otto are tied with the record for most reigns, with two each. At 995 days, Seymour Snott's first and only reign is the longest in the title's history; he won the title in a championship tournament in March 2002 and held the belt up until the promotion's close in 2004. "Beastmaster" Rick Link's only reign was the shortest in the history of the title lasting 14 days. Overall, there have been 15 reigns shared between 12 wrestlers, with five vacancies, and 1 deactivation.

== Title history ==
Key

#	Order in reign history
Reign	The reign number for the specific set of wrestlers listed
Event	The event in which the title was won
—	Used for vacated reigns so as not to count it as an official reign
N/A	The information is not available or is unknown
+	Indicates the current reign is changing daily

=== Names ===
Name	Years
SCW North Carolina Championship	1997 — 2004

=== Reigns ===
#	Wrestlers	Reign	Date	Days held	Location	Event	Notes	Ref.
1	K. C. Thunder	1	February 22, 1997	273	Butner, North Carolina	Live event	Thunder defeated Big Slam in a tournament final to become the first SCW North Carolina Champion.	
2	Boris Dragoff	1	November 22, 1997	161	Louisburg, North Carolina	Live event		
3	Otto Schwanz	1	May 2, 1998	215	Durham, North Carolina	Live event		
4	C. W. Anderson	1	December 3, 1998	203	Raleigh, North Carolina	Live event	Stephenson defeated Boris Dragoff to win the vacant championship.	
—	Vacated	—	June 24, 1999	—	N/A	N/A	The championship is vacated when C. W. Anderson leaves the promotion to join Extreme Championship Wrestling.	
5	Rick Link	1	August 26, 1999	14	Raleigh, North Carolina	Live event		
—	Vacated	—	September 9, 1999	—	Durham, North Carolina	Live event	The championship is vacated when Rick Link is stripped as champion after failing to appear for a scheduled title defense.	
6	Major DeBeers	1	September 9, 1999	51	Durham, North Carolina	Live event	DeBeers defeated Natrone Steele and Uncle Tom Kettle in a three-way tournament final to win the vacant title.	
—	Vacated	—	October 30, 1999	—	Butner, North Carolina	Live event	The championship is vacated when Major DeBeers is stripped as champion due to injury.	
7	Natrone Steele	1	October 30, 1999	N/A	Butner, North Carolina	Live event	Steele defeated Juice in a tournament final to win vacant title.	
—	Vacated	—	April 2000	—	N/A	N/A	The championship is vacated when Steele is forced to retire.	
8	Kross	1	May 19, 2000	71	Raleigh, North Carolina	Live event		
9	Juice	1	July 29, 2000	61	Zebulon, North Carolina	Live event		
10	Lazarus	1	September 28, 2000	63	Raleigh, North Carolina	Live event		
11	Juice	2	November 30, 2000	119	Raleigh, North Carolina	Live event	Schwanz defeated Juice to win the vacant title.	
12	Dewey Cheatum	1	March 29, 2001	28	Raleigh, North Carolina	Live event		
13	C. W. Anderson	1	April 26, 2001	154	Raleigh, North Carolina	Live event		
14	Otto Schwanz	2	September 27, 2001	126	Raleigh, North Carolina	Live event		
—	Vacated	—	January 31, 2002	—	Raleigh, North Carolina	Live event	The championship is vacated when Schwanz wins the SCW Heavyweight Championship.	
15	Seymour Snott	1	March 1, 2002	995	Louisburg, North Carolina	Live event	Snott defeated Caesar Augustus in a tournament final to win the vacant title.	
—	Deactivated	—	November 20, 2004	—	N/A	N/A	SCW closed on November 20, 2004, and Snott was the final champion in SCW as a company.	
16	Nicky Richards	1	October 17, 2008	5,984	Raleigh, North Carolina	Live event	Richards is awarded the championship by manager Brad Stutts.	

== List of combined reigns ==
<1	Indicates that the reign lasted less than one day.

Rank (Note: Each reign is ranked highest to lowest; reigns with the same number mean that they are tied for that certain rank.)	Wrestler	# of reigns	Combined days
1	Seymour Snott	1	995
2	C. W. Anderson	2	375
3	Otto Schwanz	2	341
4	K. C. Thunder	1	273
5	Juice	2	182
6	Boris Dragoff	1	161
7	Frank Parker	1	154
8	Natrone Steele	1	154+
9	Kross	1	71
10	Lazerus	1	63
11	Major DeBeers	1	51
12	Dewey Cheatum	1	28
13	Rick Link	1	41
