= Southern Championship Wrestling =

- Acronym: SCW
- Founded: November 5, 1994
- Defunct: November 20, 2004
- Style: Rasslin'
- Headquarters: Raleigh, North Carolina
- Founder: Count Grog
- Owner: Count Grog (1994-2004)
- Website: Official website

Southern Championship Wrestling (SCW) was a professional wrestling promotion that held events in the Southeastern United States, especially in eastern and central North Carolina, from November 1994 to November 2004, when it was run by Greg Mosorjak. The promotion was based in Raleigh, North Carolina, with offices in Fuquay Varina and Lenoir, North Carolina.

== History and overview ==
=== Formation ===
Greg Mosorjak formed Southern Championship Wrestling in November 1994 upon leaving the Carolina Championship Wrestling Alliance. He was refereeing for the promotion at the time, after a near 10-year absence from the sport, and was interested in getting back into managing. Mosorjak "turned heel" while in the promotion, and was involved in a brief feud with CCWA television announcer Henry Dean, before becoming the manager for The Invader. There were few opportunities as a manager, however, and seeing a number of talent not being utilized by management Mosorjak decided to start his own promotion. "Wiseguy" Jimmy Cicero and Chris Stephenson were among the CCWA roster who joined Mosorjak.

SCW held its first show at the Bethesda Athletic Association Gym in Durham, North Carolina on November 5, 1994. The promotion crowned its first Southern Tag Team Champions on November 17, when The Rat Pack (Jimmy Cicero and Brian Perry) defeated Pat and C. W. Anderson in the finals of a one-night tournament in Raleigh, North Carolina. The first Southern Heavyweight Champion, Boris Dragoff, won the championship in a tournament held in Creedmoor on January 7, 1995, when he defeated Ricky Lee.

=== Territorial reach ===
Southern Championship Wrestling was not the first independent in North Carolina but it was one of the earliest and longest-lasting groups, despite competition from the numerous promotions in the Carolinas. For most of its 10-year run, its traditional "home turf" was primarily in eastern and central North Carolina. SCW initially promoted events in the Raleigh-Durham area during its first two years in operation, however, Mosorjak gradually worked to expand the promotion's territory. In 1997, he began holding monthly shows in downtown Raleigh, establishing a home arena at the Kings Barcade, and was eventually promoting events throughout the Carolinas by the end of the decade. In early-2002, the promotion began holding shows at the historic Dorton Arena. SCW event tours also included, fire halls, high school gyms and fairs in cities such as Butner, NC, Creedmoor, NC, Durham, NC, Henderson, NC, Louisburg, NC, Southern Pines, NC, Valdese, NC, Wendell, NC; and in Clover, SC and Greer, SC.

Part of SCW's success lay with its long relationship with many charitable organizations. Mosorjak and SCW participated in countless fundraisers and benefit shows for local Jaycee groups, fire departments, and the Optimist Club. It also raised money for individuals in need of financial aid due to natural disaster or sickness. One of these shows involved an independent wrestler, Josh "Tears" Duke, who wrestled for the promotion until a car accident left him paralyzed. The benefit show was held at a local elementary school in Louisburg, North Carolina, and all proceeds went to help Duke's medical expenses.

SCW also had a weekly 30-minute television show, produced by Eno River Media, which aired Tuesdays on Channel 6 in Durham, Chapel Hill, and Carrboro, and Saturday mornings on Channel 10 in Raleigh. It later expanded to include Greensboro and as far away as Manhattan, New York. The television commentary was originally performed by Mosorjak, with the addition of Walt Rabon later on, and most of SCW's live events would later be taped for television broadcast.

=== Notable talent ===
Even in its earliest years, SCW was able to feature some of the top independent wrestlers in the Mid-Atlantic and Southeastern United States from Jimmy Cicero, Chris Stephenson, and Tom Brandi in the early 1990s, with later mainstays including C. W. Anderson, Caprice Coleman, Cham Pain, Scab, Juice/Gotti, Dewey Cheatum, Lazz, Lexie Fyfe, Mickie James, Matt Stryker, Rob McBride, Shawn Alexander, Seymour Snott, The Stro, Trailer Park Heat, Venom, The Dupps (Bo and Jack Dupp), Death & Destruction (Frank Parker and Roger Anderson), Dangerous Minds (Toad and Lodi), and New Skool (Joey Matthews and Christian York); Matthews, still in high school, had his debut match on an SCW show. Future WWE superstars Shane Helms, Shannon Moore, Edge and Christian, Lita and The Hardy Boyz (Matt and Jeff Hardy) also spent their early careers in SCW.

The promotion presented a unique mix of traditional Southern-style 'Rasslin and modern hardcore wrestling, what it described as "old time hardcore", attracting Extreme Championship Wrestling's Chilly Willy, Steve Corino, Julio Dinero, and New Jack as well as older NWA Mid-Atlantic legends Buddy Landell, Ivan Koloff, Manny Fernandez, Ricky Morton, The Barbarian, Greg "The Hammer" Valentine, Jimmy Valiant, Wahoo McDaniel. Mosorjak was present with many of these stars at the Mid-Atlantic Wrestling Legends Convention and Fanfest in Charlotte, North Carolina years later.

SCW had a longterm association with Anderson Academy, a wrestling school run by C. W. Anderson, as well as Cueball Carmichael's KYDA Pro Wrestling facility. Its students were invited to several shows before SCW's close. Bill Camp of KayfabeMemories.com wrote an article on the promotion for WormwoodChronicles.com, under the alias "Lawrence Alegdrop", and later made a guest appearance for the promotion as the "manager, cousin, and chess partner" of Seymore Snott, Ulysses S. Snott.

=== The Brotherhood ===
Mosorjak continued managing in SCW under his "Count Grog" persona forming a "heel" stable, "The Brotherhood", which dominated SCW throughout its 10-year history. Initially consisting of Major DeBeers and Boris Dragoff, it would come to include many of the region's top "rulebreakers" such as "Beastmaster" Rick Link, "Ragin' Bull" Manny Fernandez, K. C. Thunder and Frank "The Tank" Parker.

Dragoff, under the management of Count Grog, won a one-night championship tournament in January 1995 to become the inaugural SCW Heavyweight Champion. The next two years saw Mosorjak manage Brotherhood members Gorgeous George III to the SCW Heavyweight title (November 1996) and K. C. Thunder to the North Carolina Heavyweight title (February 1997), defeating Big Slam in a tournament final to become the promotion's first-ever champion. On June 27, 1998, he again led Dragoff to recapture SCW title, and persuaded Boris Dragoff to rejoin the Brotherhood, who had left the previous year. Five months later, on November 21, 1998, he helped Cueball Carmichael win the vacant SCW Heavyweight Championship from Big Slam, then substituting for an injured James "Poison" Ivey, in Louisburg, North Carolina. Club Security (Rumble and Rukkus) captured the SCW Tag Team titles from Pat & C. W. Anderson and Otto Schwanz the North Carolina title, with assistance from Mosorjak, making it one of The Brotherhood's most successful years.

Mosorjak and The Brotherhood also toured the Southern independent circuit with many in the group, especially Major DeBeers, winning titles in most of the promotions they visited. In the summer of 1996, he and Major DeBeers were suspended from the Great American Wrestling Federation after Grog threw a fireball at DeBeers' opponent "Iceman" Mike Murphy. Mosorjak's antics saw him being voted by fans as "Manager of the Year" in both SCW and Southern States Wrestling in 1997. The Brotherhood was also involved in a long-running feud revolving around Mosorjak and "Boogie Woogie Man" Jimmy Valiant which set attendance records in towns from Fall Branch, Tennessee to Butner, North Carolina. Many times, Valiant would manage to get his hands on Count Grog after defeating one of his goons. In 1999, Pro Wrestling Illustrated called Count Grog the "least employee friendly boss around", due to his tendency of double-crossing his own wrestlers. Since forming the group, Mosorjak twice turned on Major DeBeers, Boris Dragoff, Otto Schwanz, Jimmy Cicero, and Venom, though many eventually rejoined the group.

=== Style and controversy ===
Mosorjak, who had been brought up in an era dominated by the National Wrestling Alliance, attempted to find a balance between his traditionalist roots and the newer style of wrestling popularized by Philadelphia's Extreme Championship Wrestling, and later adopted by mainstream World Championship Wrestling and World Wrestling Federation. The result was a combination of familiar "family friendly" Southern-style 'Rasslin with modern hardcore wrestling, which Mosorjak described as "old time hardcore", though it also used a variety of other styles.

The promotion became well known for its wild brawls in the mid-to late 1990s, most especially at the Berkeley Café in Raleigh, described by Matt and Jeff Hardy as a popular bar "full of drunk college kids". At one of these shows, during a ladder match between Steve Corino and Joey Matthews, the ceiling lights were knocked out causing sparks and fire which, according to Mosorjak, resembled an exploding ring match. Mosorjak, as Count Grog, was DDTed on the ladder by Corino near the end of the match though few people saw this because the lights were still out. In addition, Corino was arrested for assault at SCW's 3rd Anniversary show in Louisburg, NC, on November 22, 1997, when police were called after Corino threw a chair at manager Dexter Holley. The attack was legitimate, as Holley was in attendance visiting friends and was not on the show. The manager was standing behind the ring announce table talking with someone when Corino threw the steel chair at him. The blatant attack was a result of Corino and Holley having personal issues stemming from Holley's role as an NWA executive at the time. Holley was the NWA's representative in the Mid Atlantic region, and Corino had recently begun promoting shows in the region under the NWA banner.

=== Association with OMEGA ===
Southern Championship Wrestling enjoyed a longtime working relationship with Matt and Jeff Hardy's OMEGA promotion, which ran in Cameron, North Carolina, until the Hardys signed with the World Wrestling Federation in 1999. Mosorjak was also an active manager in OMEGA leading Christian York to the OMEGA Junior Heavyweight Championship in 1998. He also managed many of these younger stars in his own promotion, most notably, when Shane Helms defeated Otto Schwanz for the SCW title on November 29, 1999, in Raleigh. Mosorjak also managed Death & Destruction (Frank Parker and Roger Anderson) in their feuds with Serial Thrillaz (Shane Helms & Mike Maverick) and Thug Life (Christian Cage and Sexton Hardcastle). SCW-OMEGA cross-promotional activities extended to include championship titles being both recognized and defended in both promotions. Prior to making their WWF debut, Surge, Venom and Pain wrestled Toad, Mike Maverick, and Otto Schwanz in a 6-man tag team "WWF vs. SCW" elimination match which ended with Maverick turning on Otto Schwanz.

=== Demise ===
The promotion fell on hard times as talent losses, poor booking, and other factors led to a drop in ticket sales. In an effort to explain the hardship, the promoters attempted to blame a rumored bill in the NC State Assembly to regulate professional wrestling. The bill never even came to the floor of the Assembly, but SCW continued to blame it for its troubles. Mosorjak managed to keep the promotion running for another year or two. He was able to expand its visibility with SCW's television show being seen Greensboro, North Carolina as well a regular internet television series via ProWrestlingTV.com in October 2002. By late-2004, however, with several key shows being cancelled or postponed, Mosorjak eventually decided to close the promotion. The decision was finally made due to declining attendance and Mosorjak working extra hours his regular job in educational research. SCW, like many independent promotions, tended to run above cost requiring Mosorjak to use his personal finances to keep the promotion going and put a strain on his budget as a result. SCW held its final show, "Blowout Bash", and featured Count Grog helping Otto Schwanz defeat C. W. Anderson to become the last SCW Heavyweight Champion. A number of former SCW alumni appeared for the event. Lexie Fyfe, in particular, specifically requested a match against Brandi Wine for the SCW Diva Championship, a match which she won.

== G.O.U.G.E. Wrestling ==
After spending several years in semi-retirement, Mosorjak resumed running wrestling shows out of King's Barcade in Raleigh under the GOUGE (Gimmicks Only Underground Grappling Entertainment) banner. Unlike Southern Championship Wrestling, Mosorjak's new promotion was geared more towards comedy-based "family friendly" satire of hardcore wrestling and spoofs of popular gimmicks portrayed by independent wrestlers. GOUGE Wrestling has been compared to the American version of HUSTLE. Since running its first event on April 21, 2006, it has held shows thought the state of North Carolina including Stem, NC, Apex, NC, Allensville, NC, Butner, NC, Fuquay Varina, NC, Youngsville, NC, Seagrove, NC, and Wake Forest, NC.

== Roster ==
=== Alumni ===
- Aldo De Gama
- Ali Steele
- The Barbarian
- Beau James
- Big Slam
- Boris Dragoff
- Brad Attitude
- Brent Rage
- Brian Logan
- Buddy Landell
- Caesar Augustus
- Caprice Coleman
- Camel Toe
- Cham Pain
- Chilly Willy
- Chris Stephenson
- Christian York
- Cueball Carmichael
- C. W. Anderson
- Dan Rage
- David Lee Gilbert
- David Wolfs
- Dewey Cheatum
- Duke Richards
- Dorian Deville
- Frank "The Tank" Parker
- Genocide
- Gotti
- Greg "The Hammer" Valentine
- The Intruder
- Ivan Koloff
- Jacey North
- Jesse Drive
- Jimmy Cicero
- Jimmy Valiant
- Joey Matthews
- John Thundercloud
- Julio Dinero
- K. C. Thunder
- Kross
- Lazz
- Legend
- Lodi
- Major DeBeers
- Malaki
- Manny Fernandez
- Matt Stryker
- Marc Ash
- Mervin Snead
- Mikael Yamaha
- Mike Justice
- Natrone Steele
- New Jack
- Otto Schwanz
- James "Poison" Ivey
- Preston Quinn
- Puck Willis
- Q-sic
- Ravishing Rico Rage
- Ric Converse
- Rick Link
- Ricky Morton
- Rob McBride
- Saltwater Redneck
- SCAB
- Scotty Matthews
- Scotty McKeever
- Seymour Snott
- Shane Helms
- Shannon Moore
- Spank
- Stratus
- Trailer Park Heat
- Toad
- Tom Brandi
- Too Damn Badd
- Uncle Tom Kettle
- Van Cheeseman
- Venom
- Wahoo McDaniel
- The War Machine
- William Wealth
- Willow The Wisp
- Wort

=== Female wrestlers ===
- Alexis Laree
- Angelica
- Brandi Wine
- The Juice
- Lexie Fyfe
- Persephone
- Special K
- Valentina

=== Tag Teams ===
- The Andersons (Pat and C. W. Anderson)
- Anti-Social Society (Scab and Natrone)
- Army of Won (Frank Parker and Kross)
- California Swat Team (Zack Lee and Ben Black)
- Club Security (Rumble and Rukkus)
- Cowboys From Hell (Guido Falcone and Jimmie Torture)
- Dangerous Minds (Toad and Lodi)
- Dave Greco and Billy Reil
- Death & Destruction (Frank Parker and Roger Anderson)
- The Dream Team (Billy Simmons and Sean Powers)
- The Drive Brothers (Jesse and Justin Drive)
- The Dupps (Bo and Jack Dupp)
- The Gargoyles (Wort and Duke Richards)
- The Hardy Boyz (Matt and Jeff Hardy)
- The Nerds (Seymour Snott and Dexter Poindexter)
- New Skool (Christian York, Joey Matthews, and Alexis Laree)
- Northern Exposure (C. W. Anderson and Cueball Carmichael)
- Perry and Sean Powers
- Psychos For Hire (Bam Bam and Crazyman)
- The Rat Pack (Jimmy Cicero and Brian Perry)
- The Serial Thrillaz (Shane Helms and Mike Maverick)
- Total Quality Management (Jimmy Cicero, Christopher Carmichael, and Brent Rage)
- Sex, Love & Money (Brad Hunter and Shawn Alexander)
- The Southside Playas (LA Ca$h and J-Money)

=== Managers ===
- Alexis Laree
- Azn Pursu-Azn
- B.C.
- Brandi Richardson
- Cheyenne
- Count Grog
- Dexter Holley
- Dustin Pruitt
- John Henry
- Lilly
- Mr. Jolly
- Persephone
- Sheik Admir al-Akbar
- Special K
- Wicked Walt
- Wesley E. Smith

== Championships ==
Championship	Notes
SCW Heavyweight Championship	The heavyweight title of SCW. It was established in 1995 and continued to be defended within the promotion until 2004.
SCW Tag Team Championship	The tag team title of SCW. It was established in 1994 and continued to be defended until 2004.
SCW North Carolina Championship	The regional title of SCW. The title was established in 1997 and continued to be defended until 2004.
SCW Brass Knuckles Championship	The hardcore title of SCW. The title was established in 1995 and continued to be defended until 2004.
SCW Junior Heavyweight Championship	The light heavyweight title of SCW. The title was established in 1997 and continued to be defended until 2004.
SCW Diva Championship	The women's wrestling title of the SCW, it was established in 2001 and continued to be defended until 2004.

== SCW Hall of Fame ==
The SCW Hall of Fame is an American professional wrestling hall of fame maintained by the Raleigh-based promotion Southern Championship Wrestling (SCW). It was established in 1997 to honor wrestlers who have wrestled for the promotion.

=== Inductees ===
#	Year	Ring name (Birth name) (Note: Entries without a birth name indicates that the inductee did not perform under a ring name.)	Notes (Note: This section mainly lists the major accomplishments of each inductee in SCW.)
1	1997	Jimmy Valiant (James Harold Fanning)	Popular star in the Mid-Atlantic territory during the 1970s and 1980s; involved in a long-running feud with Count Grog for much of the 1990s
2	1997	The Intruder	Popular star in SCW during the mid-1990s; first-ever wrestler managed by Count Grog
3	1997	Jack Cates	Promoter for Southern Championship Wrestling
4	1998	Wahoo McDaniel (Edward McDaniel)	Popular star in the Mid-Atlantic territory during the 1970s and 1980s; periodically wrestled for SCW during his later career
5	1998	Van Cheeseman	Popular star in SCW during the mid-1990s
6	1999	Ivan Koloff (Oreal Perras)	Popular star in the Mid-Atlantic territory during the 1970s and 1980s; periodically wrestled for SCW during his later career
7	1999	Chris Stephenson	Won the SCW Heavyweight Championship (2 times)
8	1999	Mike Justice	Popular star in SCW during the mid-1990s
9	2000	Otto Schwanz (Murray Happer)	Won the SCW Heavyweight Championship (5 times), SCW Brass Knuckles Championship (1 time), and SCW Tag Team Championship (2 times)
10	2000	Roger Kerr	Managed various wrestlers during the 1990s and 2000s; popularly known as the "Manager and Referee of Champions"
11	2000	David Wolfs	Won every championship possible and went in high class matches
12	2001	Count Grog (Greg Mosorjak)	Managed various wrestlers during the 1990s and 2000s; founded Southern Championship Wrestling
13	2001	Major DeBeers	Won the SCW Heavyweight Championship (1 time) and SCW Brass Knuckles Championship (2 times)
14	2001	Scab	Won the SCW Heavyweight Championship, SCW Junior weight Championship, and SCW Tag Team Championship
15	2001	Mr. Jolly	Longtime referee for SCW.
