= Otto Schwanz =

American professional wrestler

Personal information
- Born: William Murray Happer; October 4, 1972 (age 53) Raleigh, North Carolina, U.S.
- Website: Official website

Professional wrestling career
- Ring name(s): Otto Schwanz; Bo Dupp; Big Murray Dupp; Murray Happer; Baron von Happer
- Billed height: 6 ft 5 in (1.96 m)
- Billed weight: 287 lb (130 kg)
- Billed from: Blasmireinen, Germany (as Otto Schwanz); The Study Hall of the Existential University of Momadomaduki (as Otto Schwanz); Lizard Lick, North Carolina (as Bo Dupp)
- Trained by: Cueball Carmichael; Steve Corino; Jeff Hardy; Matt Hardy
- Debut: July 18, 1997
- Retired: 2021

William Murray Happer (born October 4, 1972) is an American professional wrestler and trainer, best known by his ring name Otto Schwanz. He competed primarily in the Carolinas since the mid-2000s, and has wrestled for many promotions including CWF Mid-Atlantic, Cueball Carmichael's Independent Pro Wrestling Alliance, OMEGA, and Southern Championship Wrestling.

From 1998 to 2003, Happer was also a member of The Dupps, along with kayfabe "cousins" Jack and Puck Dupp, wrestling as Bo Dupp in Extreme Championship Wrestling, Total Nonstop Action Wrestling, and World Wrestling Entertainment. While under a developmental contract with WWE, Happer also competed under his real name until being released in 2001.

Outside of pro wrestling, Happer is an educator and instructor in high school athletics. He was a co-captain of the Georgetown Hoyas football team while attending Georgetown University and, in 2003, became head coach of South Johnston High School's Trojans wrestling team in addition to teaching civics and history.

== Early life ==
William Murray Happer was born in Raleigh, North Carolina, on October 4, 1972. He was a four-year letterman and co-captain of the Georgetown Hoyas football team, along with Steve Colello and Jim Klessel, while attending Georgetown University and received the George L. Murtagh Award in 1994.

He pursued an athletic career following his graduation the next year – specifically as a professional wrestler. He trained under Cueball Carmichael and Steve Corino at the IPWA training facility during the first half of 1997, with additional training with Matt and Jeff Hardy, and made his pro debut on July 18, 1997. Prior to this, Happer wrote a guest column for the Insight from the Squared Circle website entitled "Bull from the Baron". This served as an online journal, which was unique for the time, chronicling his training and early career.

== Professional wrestling career ==
=== Early career in the Southern independents ===
Though initially using the name "Baron von Happer" as a student, Happer wrestled as Otto Schwanz upon making his debut. While resembling a throwback to the archetypical foreign villains of the 1960s and 70s, his unique and bizarre in-ring behavior made him a stand out on the independent circuit. He was also introduced by sexual innuendos in the form of various fictitious locations in Germany such as "Blasmireinen" or "Grobe-Muschie". In IPWA, his ring introduction was spoken in the German language. Without notice, he would switch from speaking stereotypical German to his native North Carolina accent during in-ring interviews. Happer would often perform "struts, chicken walks, dances, prances, and pounces" during wrestling matches and was later described by one writer as the "clown prince of the ropes".

Happer spent much of his early career wrestling for numerous regional promotions in the Southeastern United States. These included the Independent Professional Wrestling Alliance, Live Action Wrestling, NWA 2000, New Dimension Wrestling, and Southern Championship Wrestling. He also had a brief stint in Southern States Wrestling where, on September 1, 1997, he was pinned by Johnny Thunder in a tag team match for the vacant SSW Heavyweight Championship in Fall Branch, Tennessee.

=== Southern Championship Wrestling (1997–1999) ===
That same year Happer began wrestling for Count Grog's Southern Championship Wrestling based in his hometown of Raleigh. On May 2, 1998, he beat Boris Dragoff for the SCW North Carolina Championship, his first singles title, in Durham, North Carolina. On June 27, while champion, he lost to Boris Dragoff in a three-way match with Chris Stephenson for the vacant heavyweight championship. He held the North Carolina title for seven months before dropping the belt to C. W. Anderson in Raleigh on December 3, 1998.

Throughout his time in SCW, Happer was associated with its top "heel" stable, The Brotherhood, led by Count Grog. Grog later listed Happer as his second favorite wrestler to manage, after Major DeBeers, commenting "this big German has the most potential of anyone I've ever managed. He's big, mean, and insane, all qualities I look for in a wrestler".

Happer feuded with Venom during this time which saw Count Grog betraying him and siding with Venom. With the help of his former House of Pain tag team partner Cham Pain, Happer defeated Venom to win the SCW Heavyweight Championship in Raleigh on February 25, 1999. Shortly after his title victory, Happer was voted by fans as "SCW Wrestler of the Year". Coincidentally Happer's former trainer, Cueball Carmichael, had been the previous SCW champion before being forced to vacate the title. Happer, having been trained at Carmichael's IPWA Training Center, continued wrestling for the promotion up until the spring of 1999 at which time he was interviewed by the Washington City Paper. He won the heavyweight title two more times before leaving SCW near the end of 1999.

=== OMEGA (1997–1999) ===
Happer was a mainstay in Matt and Jeff Hardy's OMEGA throughout the late-1990s. One of his earliest matches with the promotion was against Surge in Sanford, North Carolina, on November 8, 1997. He also did battle against regulars such as Bobby Burnette, Harold Bison, and Toad. It was in OMEGA that he formed an alliance with future tag team partner Cham Pain against Happer's archrival Venom. At OMEGA's "Livin' La Vida Lucha" on July 24, 1998, he and Cham Pain wrestled Venom in a handicap match.

By the end of OMEGA's three-year run, Happer was among the promotion's stars that went on to join the "mainstream" wrestling organizations including Venom, C. W. Anderson, Steve Corino, Shane Helms, Kid Dynamo, Amy, and The Bad Street Boys (Joey Matthews and Christian York). Happer was featured in the 2009 documentary "OMEGA: Uncommon Passion" and several former OMEGA alumni, including former co-owner Thomas Simpson, spoke highly of him. Corino, in particular, voiced his wish that "Vince McMahon would take another look at him because he's got that old school vibe and he's funny without even trying".

=== The Dupps (1999–2003) ===
In the summer of 1999, the then reigning SCW Tag Team Champions, The Serial Thrillaz, broke up when Shane Helms left SCW for World Championship Wrestling and saw Helms give his half of the title to Happer. He and Mike Maverick defended the titles together for a short time before changing their names to Bo and Jack Dupp respectively.

It was during this period that Happer, along with Maverick and Cham Pain, sent a tape to Extreme Championship Wrestling which introduced themselves as "a family of rednecks from Lizard Lick, North Carolina, named 'The Dupps'". They received a call from Tommy Dreamer who invited them to the ECW Arena for a tryout match. Dreamer later told them that their video was "one of the funniest, most original tapes they had ever received". On October 29, 1999, The Dupps wrestled David "Kid" Cash and Super Nova at the Packard Music Hall in Warren, Ohio. The trio eventually forfeited the SCW tag team belts, and Happer the heavyweight title, and left for ECW a month later.

==== Extreme Championship Wrestling (1999–2000) ====
The Dupps made their official ECW debut on November 27, 1999, at the ECW Arena again wrestling Kid Cash and Super Nova. Bo and Jack Dupp were wrestling while Puck Dupp acted as manager. The following night, they appeared on the November 28 edition of Hardcore TV against Danny Doring and Roadkill. A month later, The Dupps wrestled both teams in a three-way dance which aired on ECW on TNN on January 7, 2000.

==== World Wrestling Federation (2000–2001) ====
Despite being promised contracts with ECW, Happer and Maverick instead decided to accept a contract offer with the World Wrestling Federation in March 2000. The Dupps mainly wrestled in dark matches on WWF television while the majority of their time was spent in the WWF's developmental territories, Memphis and Ohio Valley Wrestling.

One of their first matches for the WWF was against Rob Conway and Danny Dominion, who they defeated, at the sold-out All-State Arena in Chicago on March 20, 2000. They returned to the All-State Arena six months later where they defeated the Texas Hangmen.

==== Memphis Championship Wrestling (2000–2001) ====
The Dupps were sent to Memphis Championship Wrestling in late 2000. On October 14, 2000, they teamed with Joey Abs in a 6-man tag team match against K-Krush and the Mean Street Posse. Two weeks later they won the MCW Southern Tag Team Championship from the Mean Street Posse in Jonesboro, Arkansas. They defended the titles for three weeks before losing the belts to The Triad (Seven and Thrash) in a no-disqualification match. Happer was unable to appear for the show, held in Newbern, Tennessee, and was substituted by Joey Abs. That same year, The Dupps became the first tag team champions for Carolinas Wrestling Federation, however, the titles were vacated when they left the promotion in 2001.

The Dupps also faced teams such as Spellbinder and Bulldog Raines, Alan Steel and Blade Boudreaux, and Joey Abs and Lance Cade. They briefly regained the tag titles from Spanky and Shooter Schultz, the latter taking the place of The American Dragon, in Corinth, Mississippi, on January 13, 2001. The following night, they appeared at a WWF house show in Madison, Wisconsin, against The Acolytes (Bradshaw and Faarooq). Happer also made three appearances in singles competition wrestling Joey Abs at Chicago's All-State Arena (January 16), Eddie Guerrero in Evansville, Indiana (February 18), and The Drill Instructor in St. Louis, Missouri (February 19) which he won. He made a fourth and final appearance in a dark match prior to a television taping for the February 20 edition of SmackDown! as the opponent for fellow ECW star Rhyno in what would be his second "unofficial" WWF debut. They dropped the belts to The Haas Brothers (Charlie Haas and Russ Haas) on February 21, 2001, in Jonesboro. Happer's final match for MCW was against Spellbinder on March 10, 2001. Jonathan Coachman was the guest commentator.

==== World Wrestling Federation (2001) ====
Shortly before The Dupp's departure from Memphis, Happer was brought in for several matches with the company. On March 4, he faced Albert at a WWF house show in Hershey, Pennsylvania, where he was pinned following a "Baldo Bomb". Two days later, he teamed with Scott Vick against The Haas Brothers at the MCI Center in Washington, D.C. On March 19, Happer faced his former partner in a singles match at the sold-out Pepsi Arena in Albany, New York, pinning Vick with a charging headbutt and splash. He lost to Vick the next day at Civic Center in Providence, Rhode Island. This was Happer's last appearance with the WWF with he and Maverick being released in the Spring of 2001.

==== Total Non-Stop Action (2002) ====
In June 2002, The Dupps were among those signed by Total Non-Stop Action to appear on its debut PPV event. In front of 3,000 fans, on June 19, 2002, he and Stan Dupp defeated Christian York and Joey Matthews when Bo pinned York at the Von Braun Civic Center in Huntsville, Alabama.

Bo and Stan Dupp would team together only twice more after their TNA debut. The first was against The Flying Elvises (Jorge Estrada and Sonny Siaki) at the City Auditorium on July 10 and the second defeating Mike Rapada and Big Bully Douglas a week later at the Fairgrounds Coliseum in Nashville, Tennessee. While The Dupps were only together for an eight-week period, they had a notable impact during the first year of the promotion. On the July 24 edition of TNA Impact, Happer's "bumping" into Ian Harrison set up an impromptu match ending in a disqualification when Stan Dupp interfered on Bo Dupp's behalf. Another storyline involving The Dupp's was the so-called "Dupp Cup" which Happer defended in "hardcore" matches, most notably against Ed Ferrara, during his last two months with TNA. On August 14, 2002, in what would be his final appearance with the company, Happer was defeated by Teo in a "hardcore" match at Nashville's Fairgrounds Coliseum to win the NWA Dupp Cup. Blade Braxton of Wrestlecrap.com briefly touched on their career during the first year of the company. In 2007, R. D. Reynolds ranked Happer's ring name "Bo Dupp" 7 of the top 8 "Stupidest Ring Names In Wrestling History" in The Wrestlecrap Book of Lists!.

=== Return to the "Indies" (2001–2002) ===
In between his release from the WWE and being hired by TNA, Happer continued his appearances on the Mid-Atlantic and Southern independent circuit. On September 1, 2001, Happer appeared at NWA Wildside's "2nd Anniversary Show" held at the NWA Wildside Arena in Cornelia, Georgia, where he joined Lodi and Chris Hamrick in a 6-man tag team match against Adam Booker, Dr. Heresy, and Cru Jones. Hamrick later included this match on his personal "Best of Chris Hamrick" video series. In late 2001, he returned to the Carolinas Wrestling Federation, now known as FWA-Carolinas, one of two U.S. affiliate promotions under the UK's Frontier Wrestling Alliance. It was there, as "Otto Schwanz", that he began a feud with FWA Carolinas Heavyweight Champion Madd Maxx. Happer wrestled Maxx in a non-title lumberjack match at A Matter of Pride on November 11, which he won, due to outside interference by Jeff Justice, and caused Maxx to lose the title at BattleCade (2001) to Eddie Brown on December 29, 2001.

Happer also came back to Southern Championship Wrestling where, on January 31, 2002, he defeated Kross a tournament final to win the then vacant heavyweight title. At a benefit show for SCW wrestler Josh "Tears" Duke, who was left paralyzed following a car accident, he successfully defended his title against TNA's Lazz. He held the title for six months before surrendering the title in June 2002. Elsewhere on the "indy circuit" Happer also faced another former ECW star, Roadkill, at a show for Wrestle Force of America in Richmond, Virginia, on February 2, 2002. That summer, he was invited by Phoenix Championship Wrestling to participate in the 12-team Invitational Tag Team Tournament for the Russ Haas Memorial Cup being held in Toms River, New Jersey. He was originally scheduled to team with Pete Gas, however, he was paired with Matt Vandal when Gas was not able to make it to the event. The team was eliminated in the opening rounds by The United Nations (Prophet and Tiger Khan) in a three-way match also involving Lance Cade and Nick Dinsmore. Back in FWA-Carolinas, he defeated Brown for the promotion's heavyweight title at the June 29 supercard "Hostile Intentions" in Graham, North Carolina. He defended the title for over three months before his defeat by Corey Edsel at FWA's "The Next Level" on November 2, 2002.

=== World Wrestling Entertainment (2003) ===
In the summer of 2003, Happer was brought in for a third and final WWE stint. On the August 19 edition of SmackDown! at Detroit's Joe Louis Arena he and Pat Cusick took on Big Show in a handicap match. Happer and Cusick had a combined weight of 515 compared to the 500-lbs. Big Show. The two men again wrestled Big Show at Raleigh's RBC Center on the September 16 edition of SmackDown!. The first match ended after Cusick was pinned by Big Show with a chokeslam. They later returned to the ring where Happer challenged Big Show to a re-match. Big Show obliged by coming out and attacking both men. The second match lasted shorter than the first ending with Big Show again pinning Cusick.

He and Cusick continued teaming for another month wrestling dark matches against Spanky and Paul London on WWE Velocity (November 1, 2003). and World Tag Team Champions The Dudley Boyz on WWE Raw (November 2, 2003) in Fayetteville, North Carolina. Happer had one more appearance on the Fourth of July edition of WWE Heat against Val Venis.

=== Southern Championship Wrestling (2003–2004) ===
Happer returned to Southern Championship Wrestling and remained with the promotion during its final two years in operation. On July 12, 2003, he lost to C. W. Anderson at Heatwave (2003) in a match for the SCW Heavyweight Championship. Happer regained the title from Anderson, a record fifth time, at SCW's final show "Blowout Bash" on November 20, 2004. His one-time manager, Count Grog, helped Happer win the title. While wrestling for SCW, Josh Daniels called his match with Happer one of his better matches and "a great learning experience for me".

=== AWA Mid-Atlantic (2004–2006) ===
During SCW's last year, Happer started working for AWA Mid-Atlantic. From May 2004 to February 2005, he wrestled against Krazy K, Trent Wylde, Brad Attitude, Joey Silvia, and Matt Stryker. On February 19, 2005, Happer unsuccessfully challenged Ric Converse for the AWA Mid-Atlantic Heavyweight Championship in Burlington, North Carolina. At April 2 "Fallout" supercard, his match against AWA Mid-Atlantic Television Champion Jesse "El Fuego" Ortega ended in a time limit draw. At the end of the month, Happer defeated AWA Mid-Atlantic Rising Generation League Champion Kid Justice in non-title match. However, he came up on the losing end in a rematch on June 4, 2005.

During the first half of 2006, he scored victories over Jake Manning, Xsiris, Sonny Blaze, T.J. Mack, and "Rock ’n' Roll" Matty Dee. He also teamed with Tank Lawson against The New Dynasty (Steve Greene & Joey Silvia) on May 6, and a 6-man tag team match with Lawson and Rob McBride against Steve Greene, Joey Silvia, and Trent Wylde on July 22. On August 5, Happer won the 14-man Torneo Cibernetico (his team consisting of Chris Collins, Brandon Day, Jesse Ortega, Kamakazi Kid, Tank Lawson, and Rob McBride) for a title shot against then AWA World Heavyweight Champion Ric Converse. The two men met at Burlington's Carolina Sports Arena two weeks later, with Allison Danger in Happer's corner, but was unable to unseat the heavyweight champion.

Happer mostly wrestled in tag team matches for the remainder of the year. He and Las Chivas Numéro Dos defeated Marcellus King and Michael McAllister on October 28 and beat Gregory Vercetti and Jerry Wayne with Cham Pain on November 4. He and Brass Munkey, however, lost to Joey Silvia and Steve Greene (with Ty Dillinger) on December 2. At BattleCade 7, Happer defeated Damien Wayne at the Carolina Sports Arena on December 30, 2006.

=== GOUGE (2006–2007) ===
In early 2006, Count Grog started running shows out of Raleigh's Kings Barcade again under the G.O.U.G.E. Wrestling banner. Happer was among the former SCW stars to star in the new promotion. He appeared on its second-ever show defeating Yuk at Kings Barcade on May 17, 2006. He also defeated Joey Silvia and, in a tag team match with Mudd Face, lost to The Urban Legends (Luther Thesz & Cowboy Willie Watts) at the same venue. On August 5, he met his former tag team partner, Cham Pain, at the Butner Sports Arena which ended in a 15-min. time-limit draw. That fall, he also reunited with his former manager Count Grog who was in Happer's corner when he defeated Seymour Snott in Stem, North Carolina on September 16. At GOUGE's December 13 "Holiday Hell" supercard, Happer Kid Sydye with the Russian sickle.

On March 31, 2007, Happer and Tennessee Ernie Nord lost a tag team match to The Urban Legends (Cowboy Willie Watts & Leroy Zbyszko) at "March Mayhem" in Stem, North Carolina. A few days later at "The Final Count Down", he was involved in a four-way match with King F’n Chilly Willy, C.W. Anderson, and Trailer Park Heat for the GOUGE Heavyweight Championship. He continued teaming with Tennessee Ernie Nord and Seymour Snott during the summer as well as winning a number of singles matches against Damien Wayne, Cowboy Willie Watts, Leroy Zbyszko, and Ravishing Rico Rage. On August 25, 2007, Happer wrestled Snott for a GOUGE fundraiser to benefit the FVAA 93 Flash White soccer team. This show also marked the promotion's first-ever show in Fuquay-Varina, North Carolina.

=== CWF Mid-Atlantic (2007–2008) ===
In early 2007, Happer formed a brief tag team with Marcellus King. The two defeated Mitch Connor and Donnie Dollars at CWF Mid Atlantic's "War Games" on February 24, 2007, and Corey Edsel and Gregory Vercetti at "D-Day: The Fallout from War Games" on March 10. A month later, he lost to Joey Silvia (with Commissioner Ty Dillinger) in a match for the AWA Mid-Atlantic Heavyweight Championship. On May 6, he wrestled T.J. Mack in Manning, South Carolina, in a qualifying match to enter the 2007 Jeff Peterson Memorial Cup.

He continued wrestling in tag teams over the summer. He and King lost to Donnie Dollars and Mitch Connor at "Absolute Justice" in Burlington on June 16 and, later that month, with Derek Ryze against Team Macktion (Kirby and T.J. Mack). On the August 11 edition of CWF Championship Wrestling, Happer battled Mid-Atlantic Television Champion "Simply" Steve Greene (with Ty Dillinger) to a time limit draw. He followed this up with a victory over Jerry Wayne at A Date With Destiny on October 20, 2007. Happer was also involved as an instructor with the promotion training, most notably, female wrestler Krissy Vaine.

Several months later, he defeated Marcellus King on the March 15, 2008 edition of CWF Championship Wrestling. He also defeated Evan Banks at Absolute Justice 2008 (June 21), "Big" Ray Kandrick at Valediction (July 19), teamed with Chase Dakota to defeat Wallabee Joe and Ray Kandrack at the 2008 Johnny Weaver Memorial Tournament (August 16). On October 18, 2008, at 8th annual CWF Rumble, Happer unsuccessfully challenged Ric Converse (with William L. Cross) for the CWF Mid-Atlantic Heavyweight Championship.

=== GOUGE (2008–2009) ===
On January 25, 2008, Happer defeated Colin Troy and Shady Chris Xion in a handicap match, with Brandi Richardson in his corner, for GOUGE's "Winter Wars" supercard at Vintage 21 in Raleigh, North Carolina. He also beat Charlie Dreamer at "Downtown Destruction" (February 29), teamed with Prince Kofi Jabba against Dick Foley and Seymour Snott at "March Mayhem" (March 29), and King Chilly Willy at GOUGE's 2nd Anniversary Show (April 11); as a result of Happer's victory his opponent was no longer able to use the "King Chilly Willy" gimmick.

On May 3, Happer defeated Luther Thesz and Chris Phoenix in a three-way dance at Kyle Petty's Victory Junction Fundraiser at The Iron Horse in Apex, North Carolina. At the end of the month, he wrestled Cowboy Willie Watts and Blackjack Billy Watts in a tag team match with Johnny Atlas. During the last half of 2008 he won matches against El Mariachi, Vinnie Damooche, Prince Kofi Jabba, Nicky Richards, The Taker, and Damien Wayne. He also wrestled in a three-way tag team match with Seymour Snott against Cowboy Willie Watts & Blackjack Billy Watts, The Trailer Park Model & Frankie Fontaine, and the Krazy Killer Klowns. The latter match was held at "Maul-O-Ween" in Youngsville, North Carolina, with Baby Doll in his opponent's corner, and ended in a disqualification.

At a special fundraiser co-promoted by Alternative Championship Wrestling and GOUGE, the 7th Annual Seagrove SuperShow, Happer wrestled Jerry "the King" Lawler in the main event with "Boogie Woogie Man" Jimmy Valiant as the special guest referee. The event was held to raise money for Seagrove Elementary School. At the end of the match, when his manager Count Grog climbed into the ring to interfere on Happer's behalf, he was put in the sleeper hold by Valiant and dropkicked by Lawler over the top rope. He also wrestled The Mommas Boy at the "Redneck Rumble" (March 7), a three-way match against Trailer Park Heat and Cueball Carmichael at GOUGE's "3rd Anniversary Show" (April 25), beat William Alexander Huckabee at "Showdown" (May 30), and another three-way match with Rob McBride and the Goat at "Super Summer Sizzler" (June 27). On August 15, he teamed with Demolition Ax and Rob McBride (with Count Grog) in a 6-man tag team match to defeat Cueball Carmichael, Wrestling Superstar, and Jimmy Jack Funk, Jr. (with Smart Mark Greene) at "August Armageddon" in Wake Forest, North Carolina; after the match, Grog put a dress on Greene.

That fall, he also defeated Andrea the Giant at "Fallout" (September 19) and The Mamas Boy at "Eruption" (October 10). On November 7, 2009, Happer lost a three-way "I Quit" match at "Maul-O-Ween 2009" in Youngsville, North Carolina, when "Wiseguy" Jimmy Cicero (with Brian Perry) made the third participant Broderick McQueen "quit".

=== CWF Mid-Atlantic (2009–2010) ===
At Holding Out for a Hero on March 21, 2009, Happer joined Rob McBride and Roy Wilkins in a 6-man tag team match against Fatback Enterprises (Corey Edsel, Donnie Dollar$, and Nick Richards). On May 16, he beat Cecil Scott at Enter the Dragon. He also entered the 2009 Johnny Weaver Memorial Tournament defeating Sgt. Long in the opening rounds at Absolute Justice III in Oxford, North Carolina, on June 20. Happer was eliminated in the quarter-finals by CWF Mid-Atlantic Heavyweight Champion Brass Munkey at the Mid-Atlantic Sportatorium. He competed in a non-tournament match at the August 1 Johnny Weaver Cup Quarterfinals wrestling Jaxson Dane to a 10-min. time limit draw.

On September 5, a match between Happer and Jaxson Dane (with William L. Cross) at "Fatback Rising 2" ended in a 10-minute time limit draw. Similarly, his match with Chase Dakota at the 9th annual CWF Rumble also ended in a draw. On November 14, 2009 he beat Shane Phoenix in a Five Minute Challenge match at an interpromotional "Pro Wrestling International" event co-hosted by CWF Mid-Atlantic, Premier Wrestling Showcase, and Rider's Championship Wrestling.

He would appear twice more in CWF Mid Atlantic during the next year. The first being New Year's Knockout on January 16, 2010, defeating T.J. Mack, and CWF Rumble on October 16, 2010, where he and Jimmy Parker fought to a no-contest.

=== Later career (2010-2021) ===
On January 23, 2010, Happer appeared at the Sports Factory in Wake Forest, North Carolina for the Melissa Jo Bullock Fundraiser. He and Buddy Langley defeated Andrea the Giant and Robert Royal (with Neil Sharkey). He returned to Wake Forest a month later for "The Redneck Rumble" on February 27 where he defeated Q Sic. At the March 27 "March Mayhem" show, he and Rob McBride beat Rev Jimmy Swagger and Paco Loco at the Stem Fire Hall. Returning to in Wake Forest, Happer also beat William Alexander Huckaby at GOUGE's 4th Year Anniversary Show on April 17.

At Cincon De Mayhem on May 15, Happer teamed with The Mommas Boy to defeat Paco Loco & Rev Jimmy Swagger once again. The following month, he and Jimmy Jack Funk, Jr. (with Count Grog) beat "Handsome" Frank Stalletto and Mickey Gambino (with Phildel Castra (the former Smart Mark Greene)) at the Cherry Bounce Festival in Raleigh. It was at this same event that Happer won a battle royal to become GOUGE's Raleigh Heavyweight Champion. On September 11, at "Fall Out", he was disqualified during a title defence against Mickey Gambino when Happer hit the referee. He did, however, successfully defend the title against Frank Stelletto at "Too Hot to Handle" (September 25), Scapyard Dog at Maul-O-Ween, Night 1 (October 23), and wrestled GOUGE Tag Team Champions Frank Stelletto & Mickey Gambino with Rob McBride at Maul-O-Ween, Night 2 (October 30). During the event, Happer was interviewed by The Herald-Sun where he discussed his experience working on the "indy circuit".

Happer continued to appear for G.O.U.G.E. throughout 2011. He defeated Lou Marconi at Redneck Rumble (January 8), Sean Van Halen at Winter Wars (February 19), and Jimmy Jack Funk, Jr. at G.O.U.G.E's 5th Year Anniversary Show (April 9). On April 14, at the Raleigh Food Truck Rodeo, a rematch with Funk (with Admir Al Akbar, Greene in another gimmick) ended in a double-disqualification due to outside interference from Count Grog, Mickey Gambino, Seymour Snott and Rob McBride; he and Gambino lost to Seymour Snott and Jimmy Jack Funk, Jr. in a tag team match later that night. That summer, he travelled to Florida where he appeared on Florida Underground Wrestling's debut show in Ybor City.

Five months later, this time with Admir Al Akbar in his corner, Happer returned to the Food Truck Rodeo where he successfully defended the GOUGE Raleigh Championship against Seymour Snott. Later on, he wrestled against Snott, Rob McBride, Jimmy Jack Funk, Jr. in a 6-man tag team match with Mikey Gambino and Lou Marconi. Happer also beat Mike West at the September 24 "Fallout in Butner" show. On October 8, he defeated Lou Marconi (with Count Grog) at Bud Light Concert Series in Raleigh. During the show, Happer attacked Jimmy Jack Funk, Jr. following his match with Gluteus Maximus. At Maul-O-Ween 2011, he beat Leatherface to retain the Raleigh Championship.

On November 5, 2011, Happer made a surprise appearance at CWF Mid-Atlantic's home arena, the Mid-Atlantic Sportatorium in Burlington, during its "Settling the Score" supercard demanding a match on the card. His challenge was accepted by Chase Dakota, a two-time CWF Mid Atlantic Heavyweight Champion, with their match nearly ending in a time-limit draw. Happer was able to pin Dakota only two seconds before the 10 min. time limit was to expire.

== Teaching career ==
In 2003, shortly after his final stint with WWE, Happer began teaching part-time upon returning to the "indy circuit". His mother, Dr. Carolyn Happer, is a professor at Meredith College. He took a job as a civics and history teacher at South Johnston High School located in Four Oaks, North Carolina. That same year he accepted a position as head coach for the school's wrestling team, the South Johnson Trojans, which he led to the Cape Fear Valley 3-A Conference's dual-meet championship four years later. It was the first conference title the school had won the title since the 1991–92 season. The Trojans followed up this victory by capturing seven individual conference championships at the Cape Fear Valley 3-A Conference on February 3, 2007. In December 2010, Murray and the Trojans were part of a trio of Johnston County wrestling teams which opened their season at South Johnston High. They were defeated by The Comets (60–21) while also competing against Knightdale and the Chargers. On January 26, 2012, Happer and the Trojans competed against, and lost to, county rivals Cleveland High School and the Rams for the Eastern Carolina 3A Conference's regular-season wrestling championship. The teams were preparing for Saturday night's Johnston County tournament held at Corinth-Holders. Earlier that month, in a meeting between South Johnston and Southern Wayne, Happer allowed Trojans team member Quincey Williams to wrestle Southern Wayne's 263-pound heavyweight Deonta Hayes in an exhibition match. Their bout, in which one of the participants outweighed the other by 110 pounds, was called "one of the strangest matchups of the year".

- Wrestlers trained
  - Krissy Vaine

== Championships and accomplishments ==
=== College football ===
- Georgetown University
  - George L. Murtagh Award (1994)

=== Professional wrestling ===
- CWF Mid-Atlantic
  - CWF Mid-Atlantic Heavyweight Championship (1 time)
  - CWF Mid-Atlantic Television Championship (1 time)
  - CWF Mid-Atlantic Tag Team Championship (1 time) – with Jack Dupp
- G.O.U.G.E.
  - G.O.U.G.E. Raleigh Heavyweight Championship (1 time)
  - G.O.U.G.E. Tag Team Championship (1 time) - with Alex Adonis
- Memphis Championship Wrestling
  - MCW Southern Tag Team Championship (2 times) – with Jack and Puck Dupp
- New Dimension Wrestling
  - NDW Heavyweight Championship (1 time)
- OMEGA
  - OMEGA Tag Team Championship (1 time) – with Mike Maverick
- Pro Wrestling Illustrated
  - PWI ranked him No. 232 of the top 500 singles wrestlers in the PWI 500 in 2003
- Southern Championship Wrestling
  - SCW Heavyweight Championship (5 times)
  - SCW North Carolina Championship (2 times)
  - SCW Brass Knuckles Championship (1 time)
  - SCW Tag Team Championship (1 time) – with Jack Dupp
  - SCW Hall of Fame (Class of 2000)
  - Wrestler of the Year (1999)
- Total Nonstop Action Wrestling
  - Dupp Cup (1 time) – with Stan Dupp
- Other titles
  - Global Television Championship (1 time)
