= SCW Brass Knuckles Championship =

Professional wrestling championship

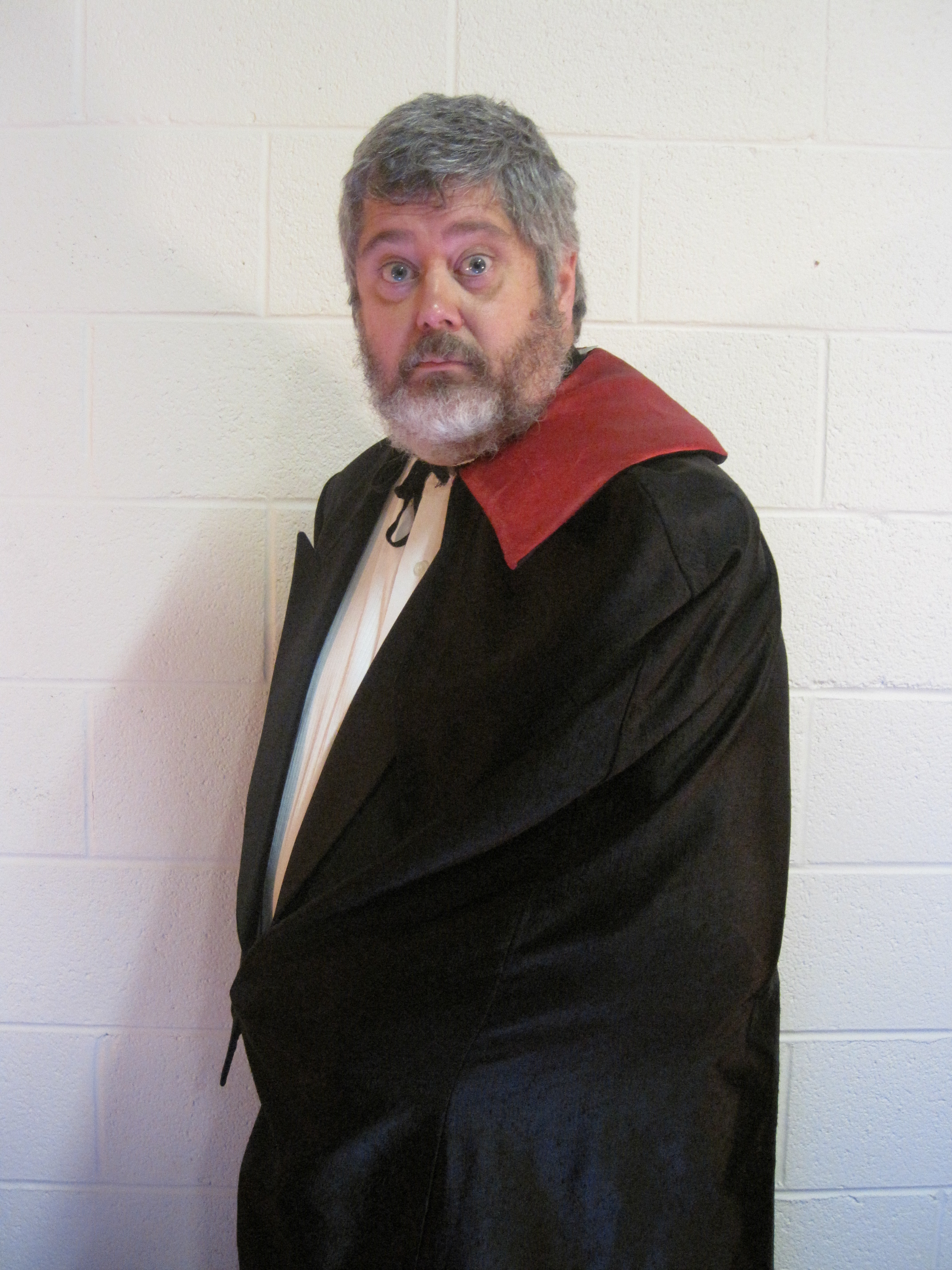
- The Shah of Grog is a former SCW Brass Knuckles Champion.

Details
- Promotion: Southern Championship Wrestling
- Date established: May 19, 1995
- Date retired: November 20, 2004
Statistics
- First champion(s): Major DeBeers
- Final champion(s): Trailer Park Heat (won July 12, 2003)
- Most reigns: Major DeBeers (3); Jesse Drive (3)
- Longest reign: Trailer Park Heat (497 days)
- Shortest reign: Shah of Grog (<1 day)

The SCW Brass Knuckles Championship (also called the SCW Brass Knuckles Championship Trophy) was a professional wrestling hardcore championship in Southern Championship Wrestling (SCW). It remained active until November 20, 2004 when SCW was closed.

The inaugural champion was Major DeBeers, who defeated Viper in a tournament final on May 19, 1995 to become the first SCW Brass Knuckles Champion. Jesse Drive holds the record for most reigns, with three. At 497 days, Trailer Park Heat's first and only reign is the longest in the title's history. The Shah of Grog's first and only reign was the shortest in the history of the title as it was won during a "New Jersey Drive" match, in which the title could change hands multiple times within a 10 min. period, losing it to Jesse Drive before the end of the match. Overall, there have been 30 reigns shared between 23 wrestlers, with nine vacancies, and 1 deactivation.

== Title history ==
Key

#	Order in reign history
Reign	The reign number for the specific set of wrestlers listed
Event	The event in which the title was won
—	Used for vacated reigns so as not to count it as an official reign
N/A	The information is not available or is unknown
+	Indicates the current reign is changing daily

=== Names ===
Name	Years
SCW Brass Knuckles Championship	1995 — 2004

=== Reigns ===
#	Wrestlers	Reign	Date	Days held	Location	Event	Notes	Ref.
1	Major DeBeers	1	May 19, 1995	393	Clover, South Carolina	Live event	DeBeers defeated Viper in a tournament final to become the first SCW Brass Knuckles Champion.	
2	Viper	1	June 15, 1996	364	Durham, North Carolina	Live event		
—	Vacated	—	June 14, 1997	—	N/A	N/A	The championship is vacated when Viper is stripped as champion.	
3	Beau James	1	September 11, 1997	214	Raleigh, North Carolina	Live event	James defeated Dave Blanchard and David Lee Gilbert in a triangle match to win the vacant title.	
—	Vacated	—	April 13, 1998	—	N/A	N/A	The championship is vacated when Beau James is stripped as champion after failing to appear for a scheduled title defense.	
4	David Blanchard	1	February 25, 1998	290	Butner, North Carolina	Live event	Blanchard defeated Eddie Edmonds to win the vacant championship.	
5	Major DeBeers	2	December 12, 1998	90	Butner, North Carolina	Live event		
6	Juice	1	March 12, 1999	15	Durham, North Carolina	Live event		
7	Major DeBeers	3	March 27, 1999	42	Butner, North Carolina	Live event		
8	Natrone Steele	1	May 8, 1999	35	Durham, North Carolina	Live event		
9	Uncle Tom Kettle	1	June 12, 1999	292	Louisburg, North Carolina	Live event		
10	James Ivey	1	March 30, 2000	N/A	Raleigh, North Carolina	Live event		
—	Vacated	—	April 2000	—	N/A	N/A	The championship is vacated when James Ivey was stripped as champion after failing to appear for a scheduled title defense.	
11	Uncle Tom Kettle	2	April 22, 2000	90	Butner, North Carolina	Live event	Kettle won a "First Blood" battle royal involving Rick Link, Loki, The K Assassin, Saltwater Redneck, and Duke Richards to win the vacant title.	
12	Rick Link	1	July 21, 2000	132	Raleigh, North Carolina	Live event		
13	Jesse Drive	1	November 30, 2000	84	Raleigh, North Carolina	Live event		
14	Shah of Grog	2	February 22, 2001	0	Raleigh, North Carolina	Live event	Grog pinned Anthony Overdrive during a "New Jersey Drive" match in which the title could change hands multiple times within a 10-minute period.	
15	Justin Drive	1	February 22, 2001	0	Raleigh, North Carolina	Live event	Drive pinned the Shah of Grog during a "New Jersey Drive" match.	
16	Jesse Drive	2	February 22, 2001	0	Raleigh, North Carolina	Live event	Drive pinned the Shah of Grog during a "New Jersey Drive" match.	
17	Wicked Walt Rabon	1	March 24, 2001	7	Holly Springs, North Carolina	Live event	Rabon pinned Jesse Drive during a "New Jersey Drive" match.	
18	David Blanchard	1	March 31, 2001	7	Butner, North Carolina	Live event	Blanchard pinned Wicked Walt Rabon during a "New Jersey Drive" match.	
19	Wicked Walt Rabon	2	April 7, 2001	0	Zebulon, North Carolina	Live event		
20	Justin Drive	2	April 7, 2001	0	Zebulon, North Carolina	Live event		
—	Held up	—	April 7, 2001	—	Zebulon, North Carolina	Live event	The championship is held up when Justin and Jesse Drive both score a double-pin. Instead of vacating the title, the two men defend the title as co-champions.	
22	Jesse Drive	3	April 26, 2001	35	Raleigh, North Carolina	Live event		
23	Otto Schwanz	1	May 31, 2001	28	Raleigh, North Carolina	Live event		
24	Q Sic	1	June 28, 2001	63	Raleigh, North Carolina	Live event		
25	Chilly Willy	1	August 30, 2001	N/A	Raleigh, North Carolina	Live event	Willy pinned Q Sic during a tag team match.	
—	Vacated	—	October 2001	—	N/A	N/A	The championship is vacated when Chilly Willy leaves the promotion to enlist in the United States Army.	
26	Count Grog	1	October 25, 2001	24	Raleigh, North Carolina	Live event	Grog pinned Justin Drive during a tag team match to win the vacant title.	
—	Vacated	—	November 18, 2001	—	Chapel Hill, North Carolina	Live event	The championship is vacated when Count Grog retires.	
27	Malaki	1	January 24, 2002	154	Carrboro, North Carolina	Live event	This was a four-way elimination match involving Seymour Snott, Jesse and Justin Drive.	
28	Dan Rage	1	June 27, 2002	N/A	Raleigh, North Carolina	Live event		
—	Vacated	—	June 24, 1999	—	N/A	N/A	The championship is vacated when Dan Rage is stripped as champion after failing to appear for a scheduled title defense.	
29	Malaki	2	January 4, 2003	189	Butner, North Carolina	Live event	Malaki defeated Major DeBeers in a tournament final to win the vacant title.	
30	Trailer Park Heat	1	July 12, 2003	497	Burlington, North Carolina	Live event		
—	Deactivated	—	November 20, 2004	—	N/A	N/A	SCW closed on November 20, 2004 and Trailer Park Heat was the final champion in SCW as a company.	

== List of combined reigns ==
<1	Indicates that the reign lasted less than one day.

Rank (Note: Each reign is ranked highest to lowest; reigns with the same number mean that they are tied for that certain rank.)	Wrestler	# of reigns	Combined days
1	Major DeBeers	3	523
2	Trailer Park Heat	1	497
3	Uncle Tom Kettle	2	382
4	Viper	1	364
5	Malaki	2	343
6	David Blanchard	2	297
7	Beau James	1	214
8	Jesse Drive	3	149
9	Rick Link	1	132
10	Q Sic	1	63
11	Natrone Steele	1	35
12	Otto Schwanz	1	28
13	Shah of Grog	2	24
14	Juice	1	15
15	Wicked Walt Rabon	2	7
16	Justin Drive	2	<1
