= SCW Tag Team Championship =

Professional wrestling tag team championship

Details
- Promotion: Southern Championship Wrestling
- Date established: November 17, 1994
- Date retired: November 20, 2004
Statistics
- First champions: The Rat Pack (Jimmy Cicero and Brian Perry)
- Final champions: Sex, Love, and Money (Brad Hunter and Shawn Alexander) (won November 20, 2004)
- Most reigns: Sex, Love, and Money (Brad Hunter and Shawn Alexander) (3)
- Longest reign: Sex, Love, and Money (484 days)
- Shortest reign: Sex, Love, and Money (<1 day)

The SCW Tag Team Championship was a professional wrestling tag team championship in Southern Championship Wrestling (SCW). It remained active until November 20, 2004 when SCW was closed.

The inaugural champions were The Rat Pack (Jimmy Cicero and Brian Perry), who defeated The Andersons (Pat Anderson and C. W. Anderson) in a tournament final on November 17, 1994 to become the first SCW Tag Team Champions. At 484 days, Sex, Love, and Money's first reign was the longest, while the team's third and final reign, won at SCW's last show, was the shortest, lasting less than one day. With three reigns, Sex, Love, and Money also held the most reigns as a tag team and individually. Overall, there were 29 reigns.

== Title history ==
Key

#	Order in reign history
Reign	The reign number for the specific set of wrestlers listed
Event	The event in which the title was won
—	Used for vacated reigns so as not to count it as an official reign
N/A	The information is not available or is unknown
+	Indicates the current reign is changing daily

=== Names ===
Name	Years
SCW Tag Team Championship	1997 — 2004

=== Reigns ===
#	Wrestlers	Reign	Date	Days held	Location	Event	Notes	Ref.
1	The Rat Pack (Jimmy Cicero and Brian Perry)	1	November 17, 1994	128	Raleigh, North Carolina	Live event	Cicero and Perry won the titles in a tournament final.	
2	The Dream Team (Billy Simmons and Sean Powers)	1	March 25, 1995	28	Durham, North Carolina	Live event		
3	The Rat Pack (Jimmy Cicero and Brian Perry)	2	April 22, 1995	364	Valdese, North Carolina	Live event		
4	Cowboys From Hell (Guido Falcone and Jimmie Torture)	1	April 20, 1996	28	Durham, North Carolina	Live event	The Cowboys From Hell defeated Brian Perry and Sean Powers (substituting for Jimmy Cicero).	
5	The Andersons (Pat Anderson and C. W. Anderson)	1	May 18, 1996	392	Durham, North Carolina	Live event	The Andersons defeated Jimmie Torture and David Dawson (substituting for Guido Falcone).	
6	Death & Destruction (Frank Parker and Roger Anderson)	1	June 14, 1997	161	Butner, North Carolina	Live event	Death and Destruction defeated C. W. Anderson and David Dawson (substituting for retired Pat Anderson).	
7	Northern Exposure (C. W. Anderson and Cueball Carmichael)	1	November 22, 1997	N/A	Louisburg, North Carolina	Live event		
8	Cueball Carmichael and Christian York	1	1998	N/A	N/A	Live event	Northern Exposure split up when C. W. Anderson was kicked out of The Gambini Family. Anderson subsequently gave his half of the tag titles to Christian York in order to reunite with his brother Pat.	
9	The Andersons (Pat Anderson and C. W. Anderson)	1	January 17, 1998	245	Butner, North Carolina	Live event		
10	Club Security (Rumble and Rukkus)	1	September 19, 1998	154	Henderson, North Carolina	Live event		
—	Vacated	—	February 20, 1999	—	Louisburg, North Carolina	Live event	Club Security are stripped as champions after failing to appear for a scheduled title defense.	
11	The Serial Thrillaz (Shane Helms and Mike Maverick)	1	February 20, 1999	N/A	Louisburg, North Carolina	Live event	The Serial Thrillaz defeated C. W. Anderson and Toad in tournament final to win the vacant titles.	
12	The Dupps (Bo and Jack Dupp)	1	1999	N/A	N/A	Live event	Shane Helms gave his half of the tag titles to Otto Schwanz upon leaving the promotion. Schwanz and Mike Maverick begin teaming as The Dupps shortly afterwards.	
—	Vacated	—	October 1999	—	N/A	Live event	SCW vacated the championships after The Dupps left the promotion for Extreme Championship Wrestling.	
13	Big Slam and King	1	October 28, 1999	N/A	Raleigh, North Carolina	Live event	Big Slam and King defeated Krash and Bryan Wayne in a tournament final to win the vacant titles.	
14	Big Slam and Dewey Cheatum	1	1999	N/A	N/A	Live event	Big Slam chose Dewey Cheatum as his tag team partner after King left the promotion.	
15	Big Slam and King	2	March 30, 2000	113	Raleigh, North Carolina	Live event	Big Slam "fired" Dewey Cheatum as his tag team partner upon King's return to SCW.	
16	Stratus and Aldo De Gama	1	July 21, 2000	41	Raleigh, North Carolina	Live event	This was a Three Way Dance also involving Dewey Cheatum and Mervin Snead; Phenom substituted for King due to an injury.	
17	The Dupps (Bo and Jack Dupp)	2	August 31, 2000	N/A	Raleigh, North Carolina	Live event		
—	Vacated	—	September 2000	—	N/A	Live event	SCW vacated the championships after The Dupps left the promotion for the World Wrestling Federation.	
18	Stratus and Aldo De Gama	2	September 28, 2000	63	Raleigh, North Carolina	Live event	Stratus and Aldo De Gama defeated Scab and Kross in tournament final to win the vacant titles.	
19	The Gargoyles (Wort and Duke Richards)	1	November 30, 2000	84	Raleigh, North Carolina	Live event		
20	Sex, Love, and Money (Brad Hunter and Sean Thomas)	1	February 22, 2001	63	Raleigh, North Carolina	Ground Zero (2001)		
21	Psychos For Hire (Bam Bam and Crazyman)	1	April 26, 2001	N/A	Raleigh, North Carolina	Royal Pain (2001)		
—	Vacated	—	September 2001	—	N/A	Live event	Psychos for Hire were stripped of the championship after failing to appear for a scheduled title defence.	
22	Anti-Social Society (Natrone Steele and Too Damn Badd)	1	September 27, 2001	126	Raleigh, North Carolina	Imposion (2007)	Natrone Steele and Too Damn Badd defeated Scab and Dewey Cheatum in a tournament final to wn the vacant titles.	
23	Sex, Love, and Money (Brad Hunter and Shawn Alexander)	1	January 31, 2002	56	Raleigh, North Carolina	Live event	This was a Three Way Dance also involving New Skool (Joey Matthews and Christian York).	
24	Anti-Social Society (Natrone Steele and Scab)	1	March 28, 2002	N/A	Raleigh, North Carolina	Downtown Destruction (2002)		
—	Vacated	—	2002	—	N/A	Live event		
25	C. W. Anderson and Dewey Cheatum	1	August 29, 2002	62	Raleigh, North Carolina	Cruel Intentions (2002)	This was a three-way tournament final involving the Anti-Social Society (Natrone Steele and Scab) and Sex, Love, and Money (Brad Hunter and Shawn Alexander).	
26	California Swat Team (Zack Lee and Ben Black)	1	October 30, 2002	N/A	Raleigh, North Carolina	Maul-O-Ween (2002)		
—	Vacated	—	2003	—	N/A	Live event		
27	Sex, Love, and Money (Brad Hunter and Shawn Alexander)	2	July 12, 2003	484	Burlington, North Carolina	Heatwave (2003)	Brad Hunter and Shawn Alexander defeated Trailer Park Heat and Seymour Snott to win vacant titles.	
28	The Nerds! (Seymour Snott and Dexter Poindexter)	1	November 7, 2004	13	Butner, North Carolina	SCW 9th Anniversary Show (2004)		
29	Sex, Love, and Money (Brad Hunter and Shawn Alexander)	3	November 20, 2004	0	Durham, North Carolina	Blowout Bash (2004)		
—	Deactivated	—	November 20, 2004	—	N/A	N/A	SCW closed on November 20, 2004 and Brad Hunter and Shawn Alexander were the final champions in SCW as a company.	

== List of combined reigns ==
<1	Indicates that the reign lasted less than one day.

Rank (Note: Each reign is ranked highest to lowest; reigns with the same number mean that they are tied for that certain rank.)	Wrestler	# of reigns	Combined days
1	Pat and C. W. Anderson (The Andersons)	2	995
2	Brad Hunter and Shawn Alexander (Sex, Love, and Money)	3	540
3	Jimmy Cicero and Brian Perry (The Rat Pack)	3	502
4	Frank Parker and Roger Anderson (Death & Destruction)	1	161
5	Rumble and Ruckus (Club Security)	1	154
6	Natrone Steele and Too Damn Badd (Anti-Social Society)	1	126
7	Big Slam and King	2	113
8	Stratus and Aldo De Gama	2	104
9	Brad Hunter and Sean Thomas (Sex, Love, and Money)	1	63
10	C. W. Anderson and Dewey Cheatum	1	62
11	Billy Simmons and Sean Powers (The Dream Team)	1	28
12	Guido Falcone and Jimmie Torture (Cowboys From Hell)	1	28
13	Seymour Snott and Dexter Poindexter (The Nerds!)	1	13
