= C. W. Anderson =

American professional wrestler (born 1971)

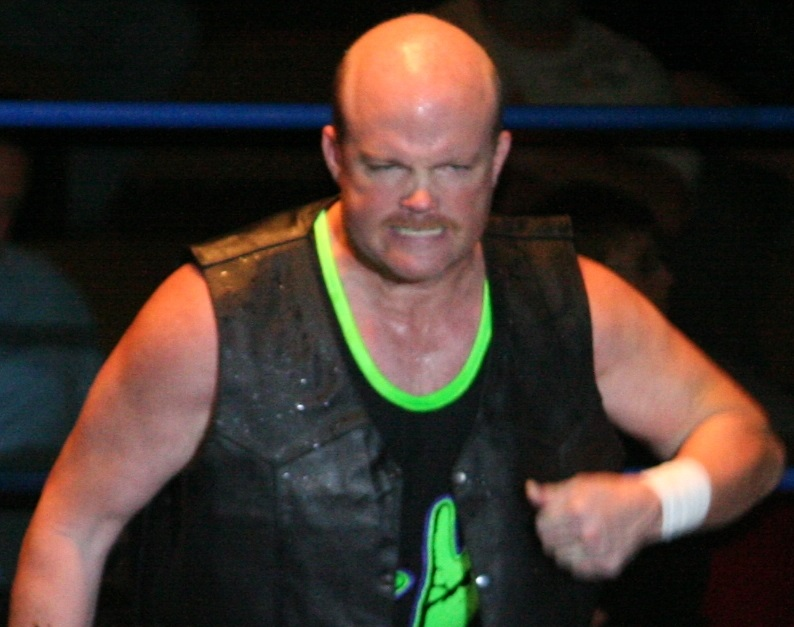
- Anderson in 2012

Personal information
- Born: Christopher Wright; January 7, 1971 (age 55) Emit, North Carolina, U.S.
- Spouse: Shelley Wright (m. 2015)
- Family: Anderson family

Professional wrestling career
- Ring name(s): El Chico; Christopher W. Anderson; C. W. Anderson
- Billed height: 6 ft 2 in (188 cm)
- Billed weight: 230 lb (104 kg)
- Billed from: Raleigh, North Carolina
- Trained by: WCW Power Plant
- Debut: December 2, 1993

Christopher Wright (born January 7, 1971), better known by his ring name, C. W. Anderson, is an American professional wrestler. He currently performs on the independent circuit. He is best known for his appearances with Extreme Championship Wrestling from 1999 to 2001.

== Early life ==
Wright grew up in North Carolina and was an ardent fan of Jim Crockett Promotions, admiring wrestlers such as Ric Flair, Dusty Rhodes and Bobby Eaton. Upon his graduation from high school in 1989, Wright was drafted by the San Diego Padres as a catcher, but rejected the offer, instead choosing to attend college, where he studied computing while playing baseball and softball.

== Professional wrestling career ==
=== Early career (1993–1999) ===
After graduating from college, Wright sought a new weekend sport to replace baseball. Several of his friends were wrestling professionally, and Wright decided to become a professional wrestler as well. With no formal training, he wrestled (and lost) his first match on December 4, 1993, under a mask as "El Chico".

While wrestling for Carolina Championship Wrestling Alliance (CCWA), Pat Connors, who was also working the same show, was watching Wright's match and was impressed with his skills and appearance. Connors wrestled as Pat Anderson, a member of the Anderson family. Connors approached the booker of CCWA, Jim Massingale, and asked him if he would put Wright and himself together as a tag team. Massingale allowed it and Connors had the match lined up before he approached Wright. Connors introduced himself to Wright and the two talked for a while. Connors offered Wright the tag team work and he accepted. Gene Anderson had died before C. W. came along so Connors contacted Rocky Anderson who was the head trainer of Gene's gym. Connors asked for permission to make Wright an Anderson and Rocky told Connors to use his judgement. Anderson spent two weeks trying to think of an appropriate forename, eventually settling on his initials, C. W., at the suggestion of an interviewer; he thus became "C. W. Anderson". Connors and C. W. Anderson wrestled as cousins of the Anderson family. During their time as a tag team, Wright and Connors won tag team championship titles in 9 different wrestling promotions including the NWA World Tag Team Championship titles. They also held the Carolina Championship Wrestling Association (CCWA), Continental Wrestling Alliance (CWA) and Southern Wrestling Association (SWA) Tag Team Championship titles at the same time in 1994.

Anderson later met Ole Anderson but claimed that he was disillusioned by the experience.

In 1996, Anderson opened his own professional wrestling school in Smithfield, North Carolina, which he later named "The Anderson Academy" where he trained wrestlers such as Chilly Willy, Lodi and Toad. It was during this time that Anderson joined the Organization of Modern Extreme Grappling Arts, a promotion run by Matt and Jeff Hardy.

In 1998, Anderson trained at the World Championship Wrestling run Power Plant under DeWayne Bruce and Pez Whatley. While there he was told by J. J. Dillon and Paul Orndorff that he lacked the talent and physique to become successful as a wrestler. After spending eighteen months in the Power Plant without being utilized on WCW television, Anderson opted to leave the Power Plant, turning down a six-year WCW contract offer.

=== Extreme Championship Wrestling (1999–2001) ===
On June 6, 1999, Anderson accompanied a friend to an Extreme Championship Wrestling (ECW) tryout in Georgia and was convinced to get in the ring by Nova. His work impressed ECW owner Paul Heyman, and Anderson was hired. In his first match for ECW, Anderson teamed with Skull Von Krush against Danny Doring and Roadkill.

In ECW, Anderson formed The New Dangerous Alliance with Billy Wiles, Elektra and Lou E. Dangerously. After that group separated, Anderson joined forces with Simon and Swinger.

On January 7, 2001, at the final ECW pay-per-view, Guilty as Charged, Anderson lost to Tommy Dreamer in an "I Quit" match. As part of his preparation for the bout, Anderson watched the "I Quit" match between Magnum T. A. and Tully Blanchard from Starrcade 1985.

=== Independent circuit (2001–2006) ===
Following the closure of ECW, Anderson wrestled in Dusty Rhodes' Turnbuckle Championship Wrestling, where he formed the Extreme Horsemen with Barry Windham and Steve Corino. The stable later wrestled in Major League Wrestling, where they were joined by P.J. Polaco and Simon Diamond. Anderson also wrestled for Ring of Honor and various independent promotions in North Carolina.

From 2002 onwards, Anderson made numerous tours of Japan, most prominently for Pro Wrestling Zero1-Max (by May 2006, he had toured with the company on 36 separate occasions). In 2004, he was given a tryout match by Total Nonstop Action Wrestling, but was not hired. On June 10, 2005, Anderson appeared at Hardcore Homecoming, an ECW reunion event organized by Shane Douglas. The event saw Anderson team with Simon Diamond in a loss to Chris Chetti and Mikey Whipwreck. He went on to appear at Hardcore Homecoming events in September 2005 and November 2005.

Anderson was hospitalized in 2005 after a supplement named Superdrol gave him jaundice and caused his liver to stop functioning. He returned to the ring after several months, during which he lost 40 lb (18 kg) in weight.

=== World Wrestling Entertainment (2004, 2005, 2006–2007) ===
Throughout 2004 and 2005, Anderson made numerous appearances with World Wrestling Entertainment, wrestling in dark matches and on Velocity. On June 12, 2005, he appeared at the WWE promoted ECW reunion show ECW One Night Stand, sitting at ringside next to Chris Chetti and Elektra.

On May 4, 2006, Anderson and several other Extreme Championship Wrestling alumni were hired by WWE to work on their new brand, ECW. Throughout June and July, Anderson wrestled at ECW house shows and in ECW on Sci Fi dark matches. On August 1, he became known as Christopher W. Anderson. He made what would be his only ECW television appearance on August 22, 2006, losing to CM Punk. Anderson was released by WWE on January 18, 2007, along with ten other superstars.

=== Independent circuit (2007–2020) ===
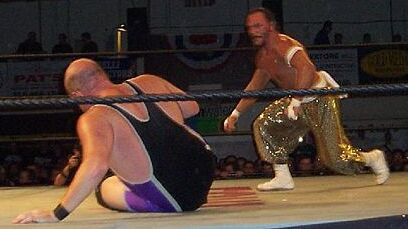
C. W. Anderson (left) wrestling Sabu in October 2007

C. W. Anderson then worked in independent promotions including Vanguard Championship Wrestling where he defeated TNA wrestler Sonjay Dutt. CW re-debuted recently working for NWA Charlotte. Anderson showed up dropping 40 lbs attributing it to his new workout P90x. On April 25, 2009, he worked for GSW German Stampede Wrestling at International Impact losing to "Bad Bones" John Kay. On June 27, 2009, he appeared at an ECW type reunion show called "Legends of the Arena" and wrestled against 2 Cold Scorpio. On August 4, 2010, it was confirmed that Wright would be taking part in TNA's ECW reunion show, Hardcore Justice, on August 8. At the event he was defeated by 2 Cold Scorpio. CW Anderson was announced for the 2nd ever match of the new Extreme Reunion organization; which is conceived as a continuation of the original Extreme Championship Wrestling. His opponent was announced as ECW Alumnus, Al Snow. On June 29, Extreme Rising's 2nd show in Queens, NY, CW lost a match against "Pitbull" Gary Wolfe. The following night, in Philadelphia, he lost a match to Balls Mahoney and had a confrontation with The Sandman. In 2013, Anderson performed in OMEGA. On January 15, James Storm, Jeff Hardy, Matt Hardy & Shane Helms defeat CW Anderson, Gunner, Lodi & Steve Corino. On May 25, 2013, Matt Hardy & Shane Helms defeat CW Anderson & Steve Corino. On October 12, 2013, Anderson was defeated by Hardy in the first round for the OMEGA Championship. On October 5, 2013, at Vanguard Championship Wrestling, Anderson defeated Tommy Dreamer in an I Quit match. On November 30, 2013, at WrestleCade, Anderson was defeated by Dreamer in an I Quit match. Now he is the AWE heavyweight Champion after winning the title at Waynesboro Virginia High school.

Anderson appeared on the December 17th episode of NWA Power and wrestled in a tournament qualifying match for the NWA TV Title. He wrestled against Sal Rinauro and Zicky Dice in a Triple Threat, in which Zicky Dice won. On the March 3rd edition of Power, Anderson won a "last chance match" alongside Caleb Konley, defeating the Dawsons and earning a contract with the National Wrestling Alliance.

=== Retirement (2020–2021) ===
On June 19, 2020, Anderson announced his retirement from wrestling. In a video posted on his Facebook page crying, Anderson stated that he was ready for the next chapter of his life to begin, and felt like he had lost sight of what's important in his life. He also stated that he had no plans to appear on any podcasts or interviews, feeling that it was time to fully move on from wrestling.

=== Late career (2021) ===
In 2021, Anderson came out of retirement and is now working in a tag team with Preston Quinn as the Extreme Horsemen.

In late April 2024, CW and Brock Anderson won the AML Tag Team Championship at AML Wanted Man in Statesville, North Carolina.

== Championships and accomplishments ==
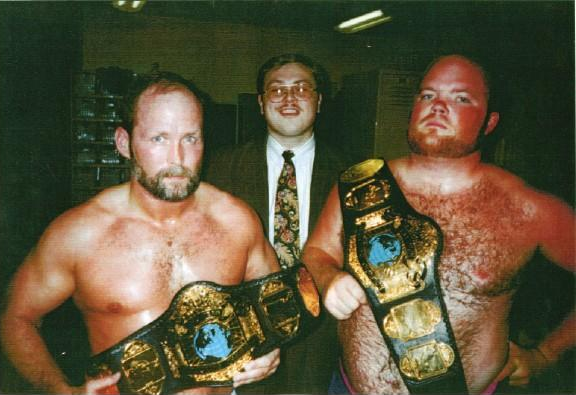
Anderson (right) as NWA World Tag Team Champion in 1996.

- America's Most Liked Wrestling
  - AML Championship (2 times)
  - AML Tag Team Championship (3 times) – with Damien Wayne (1), Preston Quinn (1) and Brock Anderson (1)
- Carolina Championship Wrestling Association
  - CCWA Heavyweight Championship (1 time)
  - CCWA Tag Team Championship (3 times) - with Pat Anderson
- Continental Wrestling Alliance
  - CWA Tag Team Championship (1 time) - with Pat Anderson
- Delaware Championship Wrestling
  - DCW Tag Team Championship (1 time) - with Red Hot Russ
- Fortitude Wrestling Entertainment
  - FWE Tag Team Championship (1 time, current) – with Brock Anderson
- High Volume Pro Wrestling
  - HVPW Heavyweight Championship (1 time)
- Jacksonville Wrestling Alliance
  - JWA Heavyweight Championship (1 time)
- Live Action Wrestling
  - LAW Heavyweight Championship (1 time)
- Major League Wrestling
  - MLW Global Tag Team Championship (1 time) - with Simon Diamond
  - MLW Global Tag Team Tournament (2002) - with Simon Diamond
- Mid-Atlantic Territory Wrestling
  - Chuck Coates Memorial Tag Team Tournament (2026) - with Brock Anderson
- Midwest Wrestling United
  - MWU Heavyweight Championship (1 time)
- NIWA
  - NIWA Television Championship (1 time)
- National Wrestling Alliance
  - NWA World Tag Team Championship (1 time) - with Pat Anderson
- NWA 2000
  - NWA 2000 American Heritage Heavyweight Championship (1 time)
  - NWA 2000 Tag Team Championship (2 times) - with Pat Anderson (1) and Cueball Carmichael (1)
- North Carolina Wrestling Association
  - NCWA Heavyweight Championship (1 time, current)
- Palmetto Pride Championship Wrestling
  - PPCW Heavyweight Championship (1 time)
- Premier Wrestling Federation
  - PWF Universal Heavyweight Championship (1 time)
  - PWF Universal Six Man Tag Team Championship (1 time) - with Steve Corino and John Skyler
  - PWF United States Heavyweight Championship (1 time)
  - PWF Television Championship (1 time)
  - PWF Universal Tag Team Championship (3 times) - with Steve Corino
  - Shinya Hashimoto Memorial Legacy Cup (2014)
  - Match of the Year (2002, 2003, 2005, 2014)
  - Most Hated Wrestler of the Year (2004)
- Pro Wrestling International
  - PWI International Heavyweight Championship (1 time)
- Pro Wrestling WORLD-1
  - WORLD-1 Great Lakes Tag Team Championship (1 time) - with Bull Wheeler
  - WORLD-1 Tag Team Championship (2 times) - with Steve Corino
- Pro Wrestling Zero1
  - NWA Intercontinental Tag Team Championship (1 time) - with Steve Corino
  - ZERO1-MAX United National Heavyweight Championship (1 time)
- RAGE Wrestling Warriors
  - RARE Cruiserweight Championship (1 time)
  - RARE Tag Team Championship (1 time) - with Preston Quinn
- Ring Wars Carolina
  - RWC Heavyweight Championship (1 time)
- Southern Championship Wrestling
  - SCW Heavyweight Championship (1 time)
  - SCW North Carolina Championship (2 times)
  - SCW Tag Team Championship (4 times) - with Pat Anderson (2), Cueball Carmichael (1), and Dewey Cheatum (1)
- Southern Wrestling Association
  - SWA Tag Team Championship (1 time) - with Pat Anderson
- Vanguard Championship Wrestling
  - VCW Heavyweight Championship (1 time)
  - VCW Tag Team Championship (1 time) - with Phil Brown
- Revolution Wrestling Authority
  - RWA World Heavyweight Championship (1 time)
- X3 Wrestling
  - X3 Heavyweight Championship (1 time, final)
