= Allensville, North Carolina =

Coordinates: 36°23′26″N 78°53′19″W

Allensville is an unincorporated community in Person County, North Carolina. As of 2020, the township has a population of 2,767.

== Geography ==
Allensville has an elevation of 545 feet. It is part of the Eastern Standard Time Zone. The township lies 5.8 miles east of Roxboro.

== Demographics ==
As of 2022, the township holds a racial diversity of 67% White and 32% African American. There is an approximate 0% in all other race categories. The township has a 13.7% poverty rate and an unemployment rate of 1.2%. 36% of residents have a high school diploma or equivalent. 36% of residents have some college experience or an associate degree and 13% have a bachelor's degree. Only 2% have a master's degree. 23% of residents living in Allensville are between the ages of 55 and 64. 18% are 65 and older and 16% are between 35 and 44 years of age. 12% of residents are between the ages of 10 and 17 years and 10% are 10 years of age. Minority age groups include 18 to 24-year-olds (7%) and 25 to 34-year-olds (4%). 82% of residents are homeowners while the remaining 18% pay rent. The average cost of renting a place is $731. The average household income is $65,726.

== Education ==
Allensville is served by the Person County School system. Learning sites include:

- Early Intervention & Family Services
- Earl Bradsher Preschool
- Person County Schools Virtual Academy
- Stories Creek Elementary School
- Woodland Elementary School
- Helena Elementary School
- Oak Lane Elementary School
- North Elementary School
- North End Elementary School
- South Elementary School
- Northern Middle School
- Southern Middle School
- Person Early College for Innovation & Leadership
- Person High School
- Person County Learning Academy

The township is also served by the Granville County School district including the Phoenix Academy that educates students from kindergarten to high school.

== Places of interest ==
- Allensville United Methodist Church
