= SCW Heavyweight Championship =

Professional wrestling championship

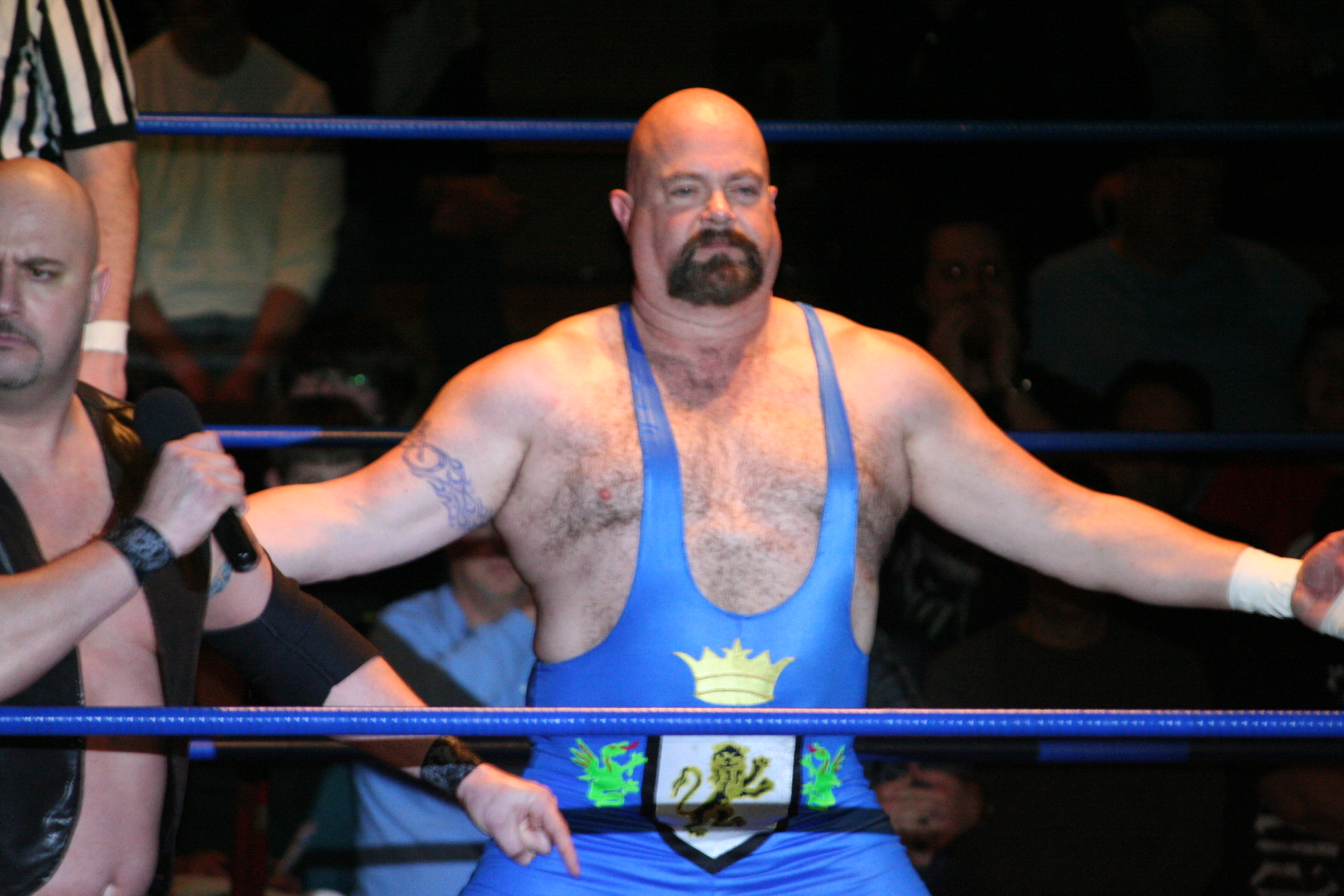
- Cueball Carmichael is a former SCW Heavyweight Champion.

Details
- Promotion: Southern Championship Wrestling
- Date established: January 7, 1995
- Date retired: November 20, 2004
Statistics
- First champion(s): Boris Dragoff
- Final champion(s): Otto Schwanz (won November 20, 2004)
- Most reigns: Otto Schwanz (5)
- Longest reign: C. W. Anderson (497 days)
- Shortest reign: Otto Schwanz (<1 day)

The SCW Heavyweight Championship was a professional wrestling heavyweight championship in Southern Championship Wrestling (SCW). It remained active until November 20, 2004, when SCW was closed.

The inaugural champion was Boris Dragoff, who defeated Ricky Lee in a tournament final on January 7, 1995, to become the first SCW Heavyweight Champion. Otto Schwanz holds the record for most reigns, with five. At 497 days, C. W. Anderson's first and only reign is the longest in the title's history. Schwanz's fifth reign was the shortest in the history of the title as it was won on the promotions final show. Overall, there have been 30 reigns shared between 19 wrestlers, with nine vacancies, and 1 deactivation.

== Title history ==
Key

#	Order in reign history
Reign	The reign number for the specific set of wrestlers listed
Event	The event in which the title was won
—	Used for vacated reigns so as not to count it as an official reign
N/A	The information is not available or is unknown
+	Indicates the current reign is changing daily

=== Names ===
Name	Years
SCW Heavyweight Championship	1995 — 2004

=== Reigns ===
#	Wrestlers	Reign	Date	Days held	Location	Event	Notes	Ref.
1	Boris Dragoff	1	January 7, 1995	300	Creedmoor, North Carolina	Live event	Dragoff defeated Ricky Lee in a tournament final to become the first SCW Heavyweight Champion.	
2	Chris Stephenson	1	November 3, 1995	386	Durham, North Carolina	Live event		
3	Gorgeous George III	1	November 23, 1996	N/A	Butner, North Carolina	Live event		
—	Vacated	—	March 1997	—	N/A	N/A		
4	Chris Stephenson	2	March 22, 1997	301	Creedmoor, North Carolina	Live event	Stephenson defeated Boris Dragoff to win the vacant championship.	
5	Jimmy Cicero	1	January 17, 1998	161	Butner, North Carolina	Live event		
—	Vacated	—	June 27, 1998	—	Butner, North Carolina	Live event	The championship is vacated when Jimmy Cicero is stripped as champion after failing to appear for a scheduled title defence.	
6	Boris Dragoff	2	June 27, 1998	84	Butner, North Carolina	Live event	Dragoff defeated Chris Stephenson and Otto Schwanz to win the vacant title.	
7	James "Poison" Ivey	1	September 19, 1998	N/A	Henderson, North Carolina	Live event		
—	Vacated	—	November 21, 1998	—	Louisburg, North Carolina	Live event	The championship is vacated when James Ivey surrenders the title due to a back injury.	
8	Cueball Carmichael	1	November 21, 1998	96	Louisburg, North Carolina	Live event	Carmichael defeated Big Slam to win the vacant title.	
—	Vacated	—	February 25, 1999	—	Raleigh, North Carolina	Live event	The championship is vacated when Cueball Carmichael is stripped as champion after failing to appear for a scheduled title defense.	
9	Otto Schwanz	1	February 25, 1999	63	Raleigh, North Carolina	Live event	Schwanz defeated Venom to win the vacant title.	
10	Shane Helms	1	April 29, 1999	44	Raleigh, North Carolina	Live event		
—	Vacated	—	June 12, 1999	—	Raleigh, North Carolina	Live event	The championship is vacated when Shane Helms is stripped as champion.	
11	Otto Schwanz	2	June 24, 1999	0	Raleigh, North Carolina	Live event	Schwanz defeated Juice to win the vacant title.	
12	Toad	1	June 24, 1999	63	Raleigh, North Carolina	Live event		
13	Otto Schwanz	3	August 26, 1999	N/A	Raleigh, North Carolina	Live event		
—	Vacated	—	1999	—	N/A	N/A	The championship is vacated when Otto Schwanz leaves the promotion.	
14	Toad	2	October 28, 1999	79	Raleigh, North Carolina	Live event	Toad won tournament to fill the vacant title	
15	Chilly Willy	1	January 15, 2000	40	Butner, North Carolina	Live event		
16	Scab	1	February 24, 2000	85	Raleigh, North Carolina	Live event	This was a three-way match involving Toad.	
17	Cham Pain	1	May 19, 2000	36	Raleigh, North Carolina	Royal Pain (2000)		
18	Scab	2	June 24, 2000	83	Morehead City, North Carolina	Live event		
19	Cham Pain	2	September 15, 2000	76	Sanford, North Carolina	Live event		
—	Held up	—	October 30, 2000	—	Raleigh, North Carolina	Maul-O-Ween (2000)	The championship is held up following a match between Cham Pain and William Wealth in which both men scored a double pin. SCW Commissioner James Thurston initially ruled that the title would be decided in a best 2-out-of-3 falls match between the two, however, the title remained inactive for several weeks until newly appointed commissioner BC announced a winner	
20	William Wealth	1	November 30, 2000	0	Raleigh, North Carolina	Live event	Wealth was awarded the held up title.	
21	Scab	3	November 30, 2000	51	Raleigh, North Carolina	Live event		
22	Cham Pain	3	January 20, 2001	68	Butner, North Carolina	Over the Top (2001)	This was a three-way match involving Frank Parker.	
23	Frank Parker	1	March 29, 2001	154	Raleigh, North Carolina	Downtown Destruction (2001)	This was a tag team match in which Kross pinned Frank Parker	
24	Kross	1	August 30, 2001	80	Raleigh, North Carolina	Cruel Intentions (2001)		
25	Major DeBeers	1	November 18, 2001	0	Carrboro, North Carolina	SCW 7th Anniversary Show (2001)	This was DeBeers' retirement match.	
—	Vacated	—	November 18, 2001	—	Carrboro, North Carolina	SCW 7th Anniversary Show (2001)	The championship is vacated when Major DeBeers retires.	
26	Otto Schwanz	4	January 31, 2002	N/A	Raleigh, North Carolina	Live event	Schwanz defeated Kross a tournament final to win the vacant title.	
—	Vacated	—	June 2002	—	N/A	N/A	The championship is vacated when Otto Schwanz surrenders the title.	
27	Jimmy Cicero	2	June 27, 2002	149	Raleigh, North Carolina	Fan Inferno (2002)	Cicero defeated Cham Pain in a tournament final to win vacant title.	
28	Dewey Cheatum	1	November 23, 2002	N/A	Louisburg, North Carolina	SCW 8th Anniversary Show (2002)	This was an elimination tag team match. Cheatum pinned Brian Perry, who was substituting for Jimmy Cicero, to win the title.	
—	Vacated	—	2003	—	N/A	N/A	The championship is vacated when Dewey Cheatum is stripped as champion after failing to appear for a scheduled title defense.	
29	C. W. Anderson	1	July 12, 2003	497	Burlington, North Carolina	Heatwave (2003)	Anderson defeated Otto Schwanz to win the vacant title.	
30	Otto Schwanz	5	November 20, 2004	0	Durham, North Carolina	Blowout Bash (2004)		
—	Deactivated	—	November 20, 2004	—	N/A	N/A	SCW closed on November 20, 2004, and Schwanz was the final champion in SCW as a company.	

== List of combined reigns ==
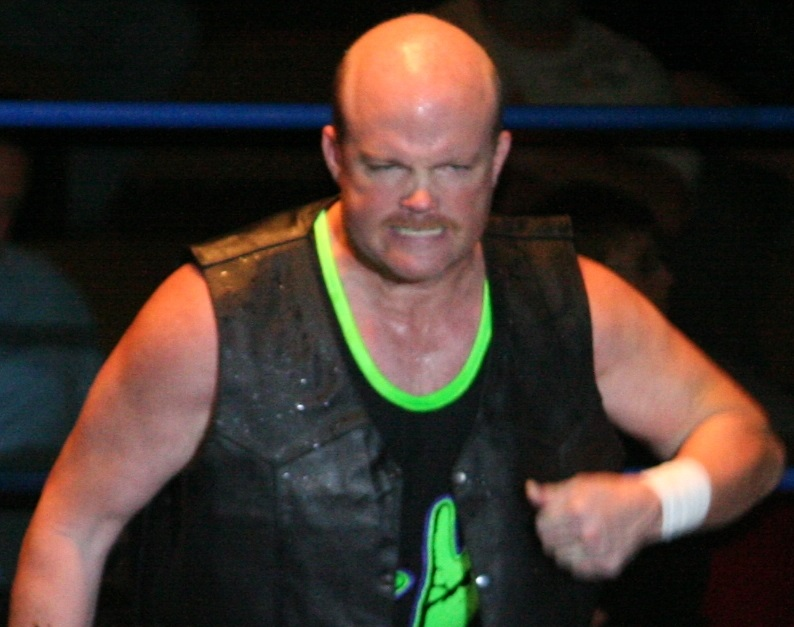
C. W. Anderson, who was the longest-reigning SCW Heavyweight Champion

<1	Indicates that the reign lasted less than one day.

Rank (Note: Each reign is ranked highest to lowest; reigns with the same number mean that they are tied for that certain rank.)	Wrestler	# of reigns	Combined days
1	Chris Stephenson	2	687
2	C. W. Anderson	1	497
3	Boris Dragoff	2	384
4	Jimmy Cicero	2	310
5	Scab	3	219
6	Cham Pain	3	180
7	Frank Parker	1	154
8	Toad	2	142
9	Cueball Carmichael	1	96
10	Kross	1	80
11	Otto Schwanz	5	63+
12	Shane Helms	1	44
13	Chilly Willy	1	40
14	Major DeBeers	1	<1
15	William Wealth	1	<1
