= Survivor Series (1999) =

World Wrestling Federation pay-per-view event

- Promotional poster featuring The Rock
- Promotion: World Wrestling Federation
- Date: November 14, 1999
- City: Detroit, Michigan
- Venue: Joe Louis Arena
- Attendance: 18,735
- Buy rate: 406,000
- Tagline: A Family That Slays Together, Stays Together

Pay-per-view chronology
← Previous; No Mercy	Next → Armageddon

Survivor Series chronology
← Previous; 1998	Next → 2000

The 1999 Survivor Series was a professional wrestling pay-per-view (PPV) event produced by the World Wrestling Federation (WWF, renamed WWE in 2002). It was the 13th annual Survivor Series event and took place on November 14, 1999, at the Joe Louis Arena in Detroit, Michigan. It was the second Survivor Series held at the venue, after the 1991 event. The event centered on the Survivor Series match, a tag team elimination match that pits teams of multiple wrestlers against each other.

The main event was a triple threat match, a non-elimination match involving three wrestlers against each other, for the WWF Championship between Triple H, Big Show, and The Rock. Big Show was a replacement for "Stone Cold" Steve Austin, who had been run down by a car earlier that night in kayfabe. In reality, Austin needed spinal surgery to repair damage stemming from a serious injury he sustained just over two years prior at SummerSlam 1997.

The undercard included The New Age Outlaws (Billy Gunn and Road Dogg) defending the WWF Tag Team Championship against Al Snow and Mankind, Chyna defending the Intercontinental Championship against Chris Jericho, four Survivor Series matches, including a 1-on-4 Handicap version involving Big Show, as well as the WWF in-ring debut of Olympic gold medalist Kurt Angle.

== Production ==
The 13th annual Survivor Series was the second time for the event to be held at the Joe Louis Arena in Detroit, Michigan, after 1991.

=== Background ===
Survivor Series is an annual professional wrestling pay-per-view (PPV) event, produced every November by the World Wrestling Federation (WWF, renamed WWE in 2002) since 1987, generally held around Thanksgiving in the United States. In what has become the second longest-running PPV event in history (behind WWE's WrestleMania), it is one of the promotion's original four PPVs, along with WrestleMania, SummerSlam, and Royal Rumble, referred to as the "Big Four", and was considered one of the "Big Five" PPVs with the addition of King of the Ring in 1993. The event is traditionally characterized by having Survivor Series matches, which are tag team elimination matches that typically pits teams of four or five wrestlers against each other. The 13th Survivor Series event was scheduled to be held on November 14, 1999, at the Joe Louis Arena in Detroit, Michigan, marking the second Survivor Series held at the venue, after the 1991 event.

=== Storylines ===
Survivor Series consisted of professional wrestling matches involving wrestlers from pre-existing feuds and storylines that played out on Raw is War and SmackDown! — the WWF's television programs.

The main rivalry heading into the event was between Triple H, "Stone Cold" Steve Austin and The Rock over the WWF Championship. At No Mercy, The Rock defeated British Bulldog in a standard wrestling match. Later that night, The Rock challenged the winner of the WWF Championship Anything Goes match between Triple H and Austin for the title. After issuing the challenge, The Rock was attacked by Triple H with a sledgehammer. Later that night, Triple H defeated Austin to retain the title. On the October 18 episode of Raw is War, The Rock challenged Triple H to a match for the title at Survivor Series, because The Rock was angered at the previous night's attack. Austin also issued a challenge and claimed that he deserved a title shot instead of The Rock. The WWF Chairman Vince McMahon solved the situation by making a Triple Threat match between Triple H, Austin and The Rock for the WWF Championship.

Another predominant rivalry heading into the event was between New Age Outlaws (Mr. Ass and Road Dogg) and Al Snow and Mankind for the WWF Tag Team Championship. On the October 18 episode of Raw is War, Mick Foley gave his Rock 'n' Sock Connection partner The Rock, a copy of his book "Have A Nice Day!". However, later that night, the same copy was discovered by Al Snow in a trashcan. He informed Foley about it. Foley confronted The Rock about it. The Rock denied doing so but Foley broke up the Rock 'n' Sock Connection. Later that night, Foley cost The Rock and himself, the WWF Tag Team Championship against The Hollys (Hardcore Holly and Crash Holly) by coming out for the match without wearing Mankind gear and leaving The Rock to wrestle on his own. This allowed The Hollys to defeat The Rock and win the titles. On the October 21 episode of SmackDown!, Mankind and The Rock had a match which ended in a disqualification when Val Venis interfered and attacked Mankind with his book. On the October 25 episode of Raw is War, Mankind wrestled Triple H for the WWF Championship. Triple H was disqualified when Venis assaulted Mankind again, earning Mankind, a disqualification win. However, Al Snow came out to rescue Mankind from the assault. On the October 28 episode of SmackDown!, Mankind defeated Venis after distraction from Snow. As a result, Mankind and Snow formed a tag team. On the November 4 episode of SmackDown!, Mankind and Snow defeated The Hollys to win the Tag Team Championship. On the November 8 episode of Raw is War, New Age Outlaws defeated Mankind and Snow for the WWF Tag Team Championship. This led to a title match between New Age Outlaws and Mankind and Snow for the Tag Team Championship.

At No Mercy, Chyna defeated Jeff Jarrett in a Good Housekeeping match to win the WWF Intercontinental Championship. On the October 18 episode of Raw is War, Chyna issued an open challenge, which was answered by Chris Jericho, whose insults prompted Chyna to attack him. Stevie Richards also got involved in Chyna and Jericho's rivalry. On the November 8 episode of Raw is War, Jericho was scheduled to wrestle Chyna for the Intercontinental Championship at Survivor Series.

On the October 18 episode of Raw is War, Big Boss Man challenged Big Show to a match and agreed to defend the WWF Hardcore Championship. Big Show accepted the challenge. However, before the match Big Show left the arena to check on his father, who had reportedly died (in storyline). The report was later revealed as a plan of Boss Man. On the October 21 episode of SmackDown, an enraged Big Show attempted to attack Boss Man but Boss Man escaped. Big Show then assaulted the police officer. On the October 25 episode of Raw is War, Boss Man distracted Big Show during his match with Prince Albert. Albert attacked Big Show from behind and Boss Man broke Big Show's father's watch with a hammer. As a result, Boss Man and Albert formed a new alliance. On the October 28 episode of SmackDown, Al Snow had a match with Boss Man. However, Boss Man's ally, Albert continuously interfered in the match and the two attacked Snow, leading him to challenge both men to a Hardcore match in the parking lot. Later that night, Boss Man and Albert went to the parking lot to wrestle Snow but instead of Snow, Big Show appeared. He trapped Boss Man and Albert in a car, smashed it into pieces and pushed a dumpster on the top of the car. On the November 1 episode of Raw is War, Boss Man and Albert attacked Big Show during an interview. On the November 8 episode of Raw is War, a tribute was paid to Big Show's father on his death. Boss Man came out and insulted Big Show and his father. On the November 11 episode of SmackDown, footage was shown of Boss Man interrupting the funeral, attacking Big Show and ruining the grave. This led to a Survivor Series match between Big Show's team (consisting of Kai En Tai (Funaki and Taka Michinoku) and The Blue Meanie) and Boss Man's team (consisting of Prince Albert, Viscera and Mideon). On the November 14 episode of Sunday Night Heat, Big Show attacked all of his team members, who withdrew from the team, making the match a 4-on-1 Survivor Series match.

At No Mercy, the Hardy Boyz (Matt Hardy and Jeff Hardy) defeated Edge & Christian in a Ladder match, which was the final round match in a tournament for the managerial services of Terri Runnels and a prize of $100,000. On the October 18 episode of Raw is War, New Brood disbanded their relationship with Gangrel's New Brood stable, turning face in the process, and formed an alliance with their former enemies, Edge and Christian. The Holly Cousins defended the WWF Tag Team Championship against the Hardy Boyz on the October 21 episode of SmackDown and against Edge and Christian on the October 25 episode of Raw is War. In the latter match, Too Cool (Grand Master Sexay and Scotty 2 Hotty) interfered, costing Edge and Christian the victory. The Hardy Boyz came out to rescue Edge and Christian and the four wrestlers cleared the ring of Too Cool and Hollys. As a result, the teams of Edge and Christian and Hardy Boyz began a rivalry with Too Cool and Hollys, as the four teams battled each other in several tag team matches and standard wrestling matches, leading to a Survivor Series match at Survivor Series.

On the October 18 episode of Raw is War, The Headbangers (Mosh and Thrasher) distracted the Dudley Boyz (Bubba Ray Dudley and D-Von Dudley) during their match against X-Pac and Kane, costing the Dudley Boyz the match. On the October 25 episode of Raw is War, Dudley Boyz made fun of The Godfather's hos for being attacked by Viscera, after Viscera defeated Godfather in a "Winner Takes Hos" match. The following week on Raw is War, The Headbangers defeated Dudley Boyz in a tag team match. On the November 11 episode of SmackDown, Dudley Boyz defeated Godfather and D'Lo Brown. It led to a Survivor Series match pitting Dudley Boyz and Acolytes Protection Agency (Faarooq and Bradshaw) against Headbangers, Godfather and Brown.

At No Mercy, X-Pac defeated Kane, Faarooq and Bradshaw in a Four Corners Elimination match. As a result of losing to X-Pac, Kane started showing jealousy towards X-Pac and their team started to break up. On the October 28 episode of SmackDown, X-Pac betrayed Kane during a tag team match against Dudley Boyz by low blowing Kane and allowing Dudley Boyz to pin Kane for the win. After the match, X-Pac proclaimed that Kane did not deserve to be a member of D-Generation X, a faction that X-Pac was a part of during that time. On the November 1 episode of Raw is War, the entirety of DX attacked Kane during a match between Kane and X-Pac. This led to a match between Kane and X-Pac at Survivor Series.

At No Mercy, Mae Young helped her friend The Fabulous Moolah in defeating Ivory to win the WWF Women's Championship. On the October 21 episode of SmackDown, Moolah defended the Women's Championship against Young, but Ivory interfered in the match and attacked both Moolah and Young. Jacqueline and Luna joined Ivory in the assault and Tori came out and joined Young and Moolah. On the October 25 episode of Raw is War, Moolah decided to vacate her title and retire from professional wrestling. However, Ivory reminded Moolah of her rematch clause and easily defeated Moolah for the Women's Championship. On the November 11 episode of SmackDown, Ivory, Jacqueline, Luna and Terri Runnels were set to wrestle Moolah, Young, Tori and Debra at Survivor Series.

Throughout November 1999, vignettes aired that hyped the WWF debut of Kurt Angle, who had represented the United States in the 1996 Summer Olympics and won the gold medal in heavyweight freestyle wrestling. His in-ring debut was scheduled for Survivor Series.

== Event ==
Other on-screen personnel
Role:	Name:
English commentators	Jim Ross
English commentators	Jerry Lawler
Spanish commentators	Carlos Cabrera
Spanish commentators	Hugo Savinovich
Interviewers	Kevin Kelly
Interviewers	Michael Cole
Interviewers	Lilian Garcia
Ring announcer	Howard Finkel
Referees	Earl Hebner
Referees	Jim Korderas
Referees	Theodore Long
Referees	Mike Chioda
Referees	Tim White

=== Preliminary matches ===
The pay-per-view opened with a Four-on-four Survivor Series elimination match pitting the Dudley Boyz (Bubba Ray Dudley and D-Von Dudley) and Acolytes Protection Agency (Faarooq and Bradshaw) against The Godfather, D'Lo Brown and The Headbangers (Mosh and Thrasher). Godfather's team suffered the first elimination when Bradshaw pinned Thrasher after performing a Clothesline from Hell. Mosh was eliminated next when the Dudley Boyz hit him with a 3D. Bradshaw was disqualified for hitting Brown with a chair. D-Von took advantage and tried to pin Brown, but Faarooq broke up the pin because he wanted to score the pinfall himself. As a result, Faarooq and D-Von started brawling outside the ring and were counted-out. Bubba Ray, the last remaining member of his team, was double-teamed when Godfather performed a Ho Train, followed by Brown with a Lo Down on Bubba Ray for the victory. As a result, Godfather and Brown were the survivors of their team.

After that, Kurt Angle made his WWF in-ring debut against faced Shawn Stasiak. Stasiak dominated much of the earlier match until Angle escaped the ring and insulted the fans by telling them not to insult an Olympic Gold Medalist. However, Stasiak beat on Angle and then climbed the top rope to perform a Diving Splash, but Angle got up and caught a flying Stasiak by performing an Olympic Slam for the victory.

Another Survivor Series elimination match pitted British Bulldog and Mean Street Posse (Rodney, Pete Gas and Joey Abs) against Val Venis, Mark Henry, Gangrel and Steve Blackman. Blackman eliminated Pete Gas after a Martial Arts Kick. Gangrel then eliminated Rodney with an Impaler. Henry hit a Big Splash on Joey Abs and eliminated him. Bulldog eliminated Gangrel by after a Superplex and Blackman after a Fisherman Suplex. Venis and Henry started double-teaming Bulldog as Henry splashed Bulldog and Venis hit a Money Shot on Bulldog for the victory. Venis and Henry were the survivors on their team.

Next, an eight-woman tag team match pitted Ivory, Luna, Jacqueline and Terri Runnels against Mae Young, The Fabulous Moolah, Tori and Debra. The match went back and forth until Moolah performed a Scoop Slam on Ivory and splashed her to win the match.

After that, Kane fought X-Pac. X-Pac attacked Kane from behind at the end of his signature fiery intro and had the upper hand for a good portion of the match. Kane climbed the top rope, but X-Pac dropkicked him outside the ring. Back in the ring, X-Pac hit Kane with three consecutive Spinning Heel Kicks and then attempted a Bronco Buster, but Kane avoided it and performed a Flying Clothesline and a Chokeslam on X-Pac. Kane attempted a pinfall, but D-Generation X teammate Road Dogg pulled him out of the ring. As Kane rolled back into the ring, he was hit by X-Pac's X-Factor. Kane threw X-Pac away and eventually attempted a Tombstone Piledriver, but Triple H interfered and hit Kane in the face with the WWF Championship belt, thus resulting in a disqualification victory for Kane. Kane was placed in the corner when Tori ran to the ring to stop X-Pac's Bronco Buster. She was kicked in the face as Kane fought off all of the DX members to rescue her. After the match, The Rock was trying to give an interview, but Triple H attacked him. The two brawled until they were separated by several WWF officials.

Next, Big Show faced Big Boss Man, Prince Albert, Mideon and Viscera in a Handicap Survivor Series match. Big Show was the only member on his team because he had attacked all of his teammates prior to the event. However, he single-handedly dominated the match when he eliminated Mideon, Prince Albert and Viscera in under a minute. With all of his teammates eliminated, Boss Man left the ring and ran to the backstage and was counted-out. Big Show won the match and ran after Boss Man to the backstage.

After the match, Triple H interrupted an interview with "Stone Cold" Steve Austin. Austin started chasing Triple H in the backstage area until a car drove up and ran down Austin at high speed. WWF Chairman Vince McMahon confronted Triple H, D-Generation X and WWF's head of security, but Triple H said that he was not to blame. Austin was loaded into the ambulance and removed from the WWF Championship match against Triple H and The Rock.

After that, Chyna defended the Intercontinental Championship against Chris Jericho. They immediately started attacking each other when Jericho shoved down Chyna's manager Miss Kitty. Both women then kicked Jericho to the outside of the ring as Chyna jumped out and threw Jericho into the stairs. Jericho taunted and teased Miss Kitty throughout the match and even kissed her on one occasion. Kitty started fighting Jericho as Chyna fought back with a Spear and an Irish whip into the ring post. However, Jericho quickly regained momentum and Powerbombed her for a near-fall. Jericho then attempted a Lionsault, but Chyna avoided the move and attacked Jericho. She then hit Jericho with a DDT and accidentally attacked the referee. Jericho took advantage and nailed Chyna with the championship belt. Chyna hit Jericho with a Pedigree and then attempted a Hurricanrana, but Jericho countered it into a Walls of Jericho. Jericho then placed Chyna on the top rope, but Miss Kitty distracted the referee as Chyna hit Jericho with a Low Blow and a Pedigree from the top turnbuckle to win the match and retain the Intercontinental Championship.

Next, a Survivor Series match pitted Edge & Christian and the Hardy Boyz (Matt Hardy and Jeff Hardy) against Too Cool (Scotty 2 Hotty and Grand Master Sexay) and the Holly Cousins (Hardcore Holly and Crash Holly). Hardcore Holly pinned Edge with a Schoolboy and Scotty pinned Matt Hardy after a Tornado DDT. Jeff Hardy pinned Scotty after a 450° Splash but was eliminated after Grand Master Sexay hit a Tennessee Jam. Christian then eliminated Grand Master Sexay after a Diving Reverse DDT and Crash Holly after an Impaler but was quickly pinned by Hardcore Holly with a Victory Roll. Hardcore Holly was the sole survivor.

After that, the New Age Outlaws (Billy Gunn and Road Dogg) defended the WWF Tag Team Championship against Mankind and Al Snow. Mankind and Gunn started exchanging blows until the action spilled outside the ring. Back in the ring, Gunn and Road Dogg quickly tagged in each other as they hurt Snow outside the ring. After being dominated, Snow performed a Clothesline on Road Dogg and tagged in Mankind, while Road Dogg tagged in Gunn. Mankind started dominating until Gunn hit with a Fame-asser. Road Dogg then attempted a Pumphandle Drop on Mankind, but Snow hit him with a Snow Plow. Mankind then stuffed a smelly sock down Gunn’s throat, and simultaneously applied the mandible claw to Road Dogg for a double mandible claw. However, Gunn and Road Dogg broke free, and then threw Al Snow into the steps and hit Mankind with a Texas Piledriver to win the match and retain the Tag Team Championship.

=== Main event match ===
In the main event, Big Show was revealed as the substitute for the hospitalized "Stone Cold" Steve Austin in the Triple Threat match against WWF Champion Triple H and The Rock. Triple H and The Rock started double-teaming Big Show who fought back by clotheslining both opponents. The Rock eventually hit Big Show with a People's Elbow but Triple H attacked Rock. Big Show then hit a Sidewalk Slam on The Rock and fought Triple H outside of the ring, where The Rock rejoined the fight. Triple H and The Rock suplexed Big Show onto the Spanish broadcast table and then continued to fight each other in the ring until the referee was knocked out. The Rock then threw Triple H into the top turnbuckle and hit him with a Rock Bottom. The Rock attempt a pinfall but the referee was still out. Finally, Shane McMahon came in as a replacement referee but Triple H kicked out at two. The Rock eventually hit another Rock Bottom when Big Show rejoined the action, pulling McMahon out of the ring, attacking The Rock on the broadcast table and hitting Triple H with a stomp, an elbow drop and a legdrop. D-Generation X interfered in the match to help Triple H, but Vince also ran into the ring and hit Triple H with the championship belt. Big Show took advantage and chokeslammed Triple H to win the match and the WWF Championship.

== Reception ==
In 2014, Dylan Diot of 411Mania gave the event a rating of 5.0 [Not So Good], stating, "This show felt more like an episode of Raw than a PPV. All of the classic Survivor Series elimination matches were thrown together, a majority of the show was taken over by the Stone Cold car angle, and the wrestling wasn't all that good with only two exceptions. If [you're] a Big Show fan and want to see his crowning moment since coming to the WWF early in the year, then this show is worth a look. Otherwise, nothing to see here".

== Aftermath ==
After Big Show won the WWF Championship at Survivor Series, he continued his rivalry with Big Boss Man. The next night on Raw, Boss Man defeated The Rock in a Hardcore match, with help from Prince Albert, to become the number one contender for the WWF Championship. At the new December pay-per-view, Armageddon, Big Show defeated Boss Man to retain the title.

Since "Stone Cold" Steve Austin was hit with a car, the WWF Chairman Vince McMahon continuously blamed Triple H and D-Generation X for the attack. On the November 18 episode of SmackDown, DX assaulted McMahon's Corporate Stooges (Pat Patterson and Gerald Brisco). Sgt. Slaughter informed McMahon of the attack and told McMahon that Triple H had invited him to DX's locker room. McMahon went to the locker room, where Triple H warned McMahon not to make this personal. Later in the night, Triple H came down to the ring and blamed McMahon for his title loss at Survivor Series and then challenged McMahon to a match at Armageddon. Shortly after, footage was shown of backstage where the McMahon family had fallen down the stairs. On the November 22 episode of Raw Is War, Vince destroyed a limousine carrying DX using his car. Although DX retreated, the limousine was destroyed. Later that night, police officers arrested Vince for assaulting DX; Triple H attacked the hand-cuffed Vince and later accused him of orchestrating the attack on Austin at Survivor Series. Shane McMahon came to his father's defense and informed Triple H that Vince would accept Triple H's challenge at Armageddon. On the November 29 episode of Raw Is War, Vince's daughter Stephanie McMahon was supposed to (storyline) marry Test. The ceremony was interrupted by Triple H, who showed a video of himself and an unconscious Stephanie getting married. On the December 2 episode of SmackDown, Triple H announced that his match against Vince at Armageddon would be a No Holds Barred match, and on the following episode of Raw Is War a further stipulation was added to the match. If Vince won the match, Triple H and Stephanie's marriage would be annulled but if Triple H won, he would be granted a WWF Championship match. At Armageddon, Triple H defeated Vince in a No Holds Barred match, after Stephanie betrayed Vince and helped Triple H in finishing Vince with a sledgehammer. It was later revealed that Rikishi had run over Austin on Triple H's orders.

Austin later made his return at Backlash 2000 in April, where he helped The Rock defeat Triple H for the WWF Championship. This was Austin's first appearance since Survivor Series over six months prior. He would make a full return at Unforgiven.

== Results ==
No.	Results	Stipulations	Times
1	D'Lo Brown, The Godfather, and The Headbangers (Mosh and Thrasher) defeated The Acolytes (Bradshaw and Faarooq) and The Dudley Boyz (Bubba Ray Dudley and D-Von Dudley)	4-on-4 Survivor Series match^{1}	9:36
2	Kurt Angle defeated Shawn Stasiak	Singles match	5:57
3	Gangrel, Mark Henry, Steve Blackman, and Val Venis defeated The British Bulldog and Mean Street Posse (Joey Abs, Pete Gas, and Rodney)	4-on-4 Survivor Series match^{2}	9:08
4	Debra, The Fabulous Moolah, Mae Young, and Tori defeated Ivory, Jacqueline, Luna, and Terri Runnels	Eight-woman tag team match	1:52
5	Kane defeated X-Pac by disqualification	Singles match	4:15
6	Big Show defeated Big Boss Man, Mideon, Prince Albert, and Viscera	1-on-4 Handicap Survivor Series match^{3}	1:24
7	Chyna (c) (with Miss Kitty) defeated Chris Jericho	Intergender match for the WWF Intercontinental Championship	13:45
8	The Hollys (Crash Holly and Hardcore Holly) and Too Cool (Grand Master Sexay and Scotty 2 Hotty) defeated Edge and Christian and The Hardy Boyz (Jeff Hardy and Matt Hardy) (with Terri Runnels)	4-on-4 Survivor Series match^{4}	14:27
9	New Age Outlaws (Billy Gunn and Road Dogg) (c) defeated Al Snow and Mankind (with Head)	Tag team match for the WWF Tag Team Championship	13:59
10	Big Show defeated Triple H (c) and The Rock	Triple threat match for the WWF Championship	16:16
(c) / – the champion(s) heading into the match

=== Survivor Series matches ===
^1

Eliminated	Wrestler	Eliminated by	Method	Time
1	Thrasher	Bradshaw	Pinfall	3:40
2	Mosh	Bubba Ray Dudley	Pinfall	4:57
3	Bradshaw	N/A	Disqualification	5:52
4	Faarooq	N/A	Double countout	6:45
4	D-Von Dudley	N/A	Double countout	6:45
6	Bubba Ray Dudley	D'Lo Brown	Pinfall	9:36
Survivors:	D'Lo Brown and The Godfather			

^2

Eliminated	Wrestler	Eliminated by	Method	Time
1	Pete Gas	Steve Blackman	Pinfall	2:56
2	Rodney	Gangrel	Pinfall	4:21
3	Joey Abs	Mark Henry	Pinfall	6:02
4	Gangrel	The British Bulldog	Pinfall	6:46
5	Steve Blackman	The British Bulldog	Pinfall	7:32
6	The British Bulldog	Val Venis	Pinfall	9:08
Survivors:	Mark Henry and Val Venis			

^3

Eliminated	Wrestler	Eliminated by	Method	Time
1	Mideon	Big Show	Pinfall	0:18
2	Prince Albert	Big Show	Pinfall	0:30
3	Viscera	Big Show	Pinfall	0:55
4	Big Boss Man	N/A	Countout	1:24
Sole Survivor:	Big Show			

^4

Eliminated	Wrestler	Eliminated by	Method	Time
1	Edge	Hardcore Holly	Pinfall	6:06
2	Matt Hardy	Scotty 2 Hotty	Pinfall	6:22
3	Scotty 2 Hotty	Jeff Hardy	Pinfall	10:11
4	Jeff Hardy	Grand Master Sexay	Pinfall	11:34
5	Grand Master Sexay	Christian	Pinfall	11:45
6	Crash Holly	Christian	Pinfall	13:58
7	Christian	Hardcore Holly	Pinfall	14:27
Sole Survivor:	Hardcore Holly			
