= Mike Maverick =

American professional wrestler

Personal information
- Born: Michael Howell; December 9, 1968 (age 57) Tallahassee, Florida, United States

Professional wrestling career
- Ring name(s): Mike Maverick; Jack Dupp; Mike Howell; Mike Powell; Mike Hard
- Billed height: 6 ft 6 in (1.98 m)
- Billed weight: 264 lb (120 kg)
- Billed from: Lizard Lick, North Carolina (as Jack Dupp)
- Trained by: Gene Anderson; Nelson Royal
- Debut: 1986
- Retired: 2001

Michael Howell (born December 9, 1968) is an American professional wrestler best known by his ring name Mike Maverick and Jack Dupp. He competed primarily in the Carolinas promotions including CWF Mid-Atlantic, OMEGA, and Southern Championship Wrestling.

Howell was also a member of The Dupps, along with kayfabe "cousins" Bo and Puck Dupp, wrestling as Jack Dupp in Extreme Championship Wrestling, and World Wrestling Federation.

== Professional wrestling career ==
=== Early career (1989-1997) ===
Maverick began his wrestling career in 1986. He would wrestle for the World Wrestling Federation in 1989 and 1990 as enhancement talent having matches against Andre the Giant and Haku (wrestler) and Powers of Pain. In 1991, he made a couple of appearances for World Championship Wrestling. He continued to work in the independents in the Carolinas.

=== Serial Thrillaz (1997–1999) ===
Maverick began calling himself "Big Daddy" Mike Maverick, and teamed with, initially using the team name Assault and Battery. They later dubbed themselves The Serial Thrillaz, and won several independent tag championships. The pair also began wrestling in the Organization of Modern Extreme Grappling Arts (OMEGA), which was founded by The Hardy Boyz (Matt and Jeff). The Serial Thrillaz won the OMEGA Tag Team Championship twice between 1997 and 1998, before they began competing for Southern Championship Wrestling (SCW). They won the SCW Tag Team Championship, and Helms also won the SCW Heavyweight Championship. SCW would mark the end of the Serial Thrillaz, as Helms vacated both titles before moving on to NWA Worldwide.

=== The Dupps (1999–2001) ===
In the summer of 1999, the then reigning SCW Tag Team Champions, The Serial Thrillaz, broke up when Shane Helms left SCW for World Championship Wrestling and saw Helms give his half of the title to Happer. He and Mike Maverick defended the titles together for a short time before changing their names to Bo and Jack Dupp respectively.

It was during this period that Happer, along with Maverick and Cham Pain, sent a tape to Extreme Championship Wrestling which introduced themselves as "a family of rednecks from Lizard Lick, North Carolina, named 'The Dupps'". They received a call from Tommy Dreamer who invited them to the ECW Arena for a tryout match. Dreamer later told them that their video was "one of the funniest, most original tapes they had ever received". On October 29, 1999, The Dupps wrestled David "Kid" Cash and Super Nova at the Packard Music Hall in Warren, Ohio. The trio eventually forfeited the SCW tag team belts, and Happer the heavyweight title, and left for ECW a month later.

==== Extreme Championship Wrestling (1999–2000) ====
The Dupps made their official ECW debut on November 27, 1999, at the ECW Arena again wrestling Kid Kash and Super Nova. Bo and Jack Dupp were wrestling while Puck Dupp acted as manager. The following night, they appeared on the November 28 edition of Hardcore TV against Danny Doring and Roadkill. A month later, The Dupps wrestled both teams in a three-way dance which aired on ECW on TNN on January 7, 2000.

They feuded with Danny Doring and Roadkill over who should have a shot at the ECW World Tag Team Championship. The rivalry culminated when The Dupps signed a World Wrestling Federation developmental deal, resulting in a loser leaves town match on the February 25, 2000 episode of ECW on TNN, that the Dupps lost.

==== World Wrestling Federation (2000–2001) ====
Despite being promised contracts with ECW, Happer and Maverick instead decided to accept a contract offer with the World Wrestling Federation in March 2000. The Dupps mainly wrestled in dark matches on WWF television feuding with the Mean Street Posse while the majority of their time was spent in the WWF's developmental territories, Memphis and Ohio Valley Wrestling.

One of their first matches for the WWF was against Rob Conway and Danny Dominion, who they defeated, at the sold-out All-State Arena in Chicago on March 20, 2000. They returned to the All-State Arena six months later where they defeated the Texas Hangmen. They had matches against Kai En Tai, Just Joe, Joey Abs and the APA.

==== Memphis Championship Wrestling (2000–2001) ====
The Dupps were sent to Memphis Championship Wrestling in late 2000. On October 14, 2000, they teamed with Joey Abs in a 6-man tag team match against K-Krush and the Mean Street Posse. Two weeks later they won the MCW Southern Tag Team Championship from the Mean Street Posse in Jonesboro, Arkansas. They defended the titles for three weeks before losing the belts to The Triad (Seven and Thrash) in a no-disqualification match. Happer was unable to appear for the show, held in Newbern, Tennessee, and was substituted by Joey Abs. That same year, The Dupps became the first tag team champions for Carolinas Wrestling Federation, however, the titles were vacated when they left the promotion in 2001.

The Dupps also faced teams such as Spellbinder and Bulldog Raines, Alan Steel and Blade Boudreaux, and Joey Abs and Lance Cade. They briefly regained the tag titles from Spanky and Shooter Schultz, the latter taking the place of The American Dragon, in Corinth, Mississippi, on January 13, 2001. The following night, they appeared at a WWF house show in Madison, Wisconsin, against The Acolytes (Bradshaw and Faarooq). They dropped the belts to The Haas Brothers (Charlie Haas and Russ Haas) on February 21, 2001, in Jonesboro.

=== Later career (2001) ===
After the breakup of the Dupps, Maverick changed his name to Mike Hard in Ohio Valley Wrestling which was a WWF developmental territory. Mike Hard was a member of the Revolution stable. His last match was on August 15, 2001 when he lost to Nick Dinsmore in a Loser Leaves OVW match. After the match, he retired from wrestling.

== Championships and accomplishments ==
- CWF Mid-Atlantic
  - CWF Mid-Atlantic Tag Team Championship (1 time) – with Bo Dupp
- Memphis Championship Wrestling
  - MCW Southern Tag Team Championship (2 times) – with Bo Dupp and Puck Dupp
- New Dimension Wrestling
  - NDW Tag Team Championship (1 time) – with Shane Helms
- OMEGA
  - OMEGA Tag Team Championship (3 times) – with Otto Schwanz (1) and Shane Helms (2)
- Southern Championship Wrestling
  - SCW Tag Team Championship (2 times) – with Bo Dupp (1) and Shane Helms (1)
