= Russ Haas =

American professional wrestler (1974-2001)

- Russ Haas, one half of the Haas brothers.

Personal information
- Born: Thomas Russell Haas; March 11, 1974 Edmond, Oklahoma, United States
- Died: December 15, 2001 (aged 27) Cincinnati, Ohio, United States
- Cause of death: Heart failure
- Spouse: Deedra Haas (m. 1992)

Professional wrestling career
- Ring name: Russ Haas
- Billed height: 6 ft 2 in (1.88 m)
- Billed weight: 220 lb (100 kg; 16 st)
- Billed from: Oklahoma
- Trained by: Mike Sharpe
- Debut: 1998

Thomas Russell Haas (March 11, 1974 – December 15, 2001) was an American professional wrestler. He is best known for his work alongside his older brother Charlie in Memphis Championship Wrestling and Jersey All Pro Wrestling.

Haas was a collegiate wrestler at Seton Hall University, and was then trained for a career in professional wrestling by Mike Sharpe. He quickly began working on the independent circuit alongside his brother Charlie, with the two forming a tag team known as The Haas Brothers. They won the JAPW Tag Team Championship for the first time in mid-1998, and won it for the second time in mid-1999. They went on to win the Pennsylvania Championship Wrestling Tag Team Championship and the ECWA Tag Team Championship in 2000, and also won the CZW World Tag Team Championship in early 2000. In late 2000, The Haas Brothers signed a contract with the World Wrestling Federation, and were assigned to the developmental territories, the Heartland Wrestling Association and Memphis Championship Wrestling (MCW). In MCW, they won the MCW Tag Team Championship on three occasions during early 2001.

In September 2001, Haas had a heart attack, and in December, died in his sleep at the age of 27. Following his death, several wrestling personalities paid tribute to Haas, including Low Ki and Kevin Kelly. JAPW held the Russ Haas Memorial Show in February 2002, and in August 2002 Phoenix Championship Wrestling held The Russ Haas Memorial Tag Team Tournament. In 2004, he was inducted into the ECWA Hall of Fame and in 2007 he was inducted into the JAPW Hall of Fame.

== Professional wrestling career ==
Haas was a former collegiate wrestler at Seton Hall University. On July 22, 1998, The Haas Brothers won the Jersey All Pro Wrestling Tag Team Championship by defeating The Skin Head Express. They lost it to The Nation of Immigration just over a month later on August 25. They won the championship for the second time on May 21, 1999, by defeating The Big Unit (Rick Silver and Dave Desire), and held the championship until February 25, 2000 when they were defeated by Da Hit Squad. During 2000 they also held the Pennsylvania Championship Wrestling Tag Team Championship, which they won by defeating Jeff Peterson and Boogie Woogie Brown, and the ECWA Tag Team Championship in the East Coast Wrestling Association promotion, which they won by defeating The Backseat Boyz (Trent Acid and Johnny Kashmere). They also competed in Maryland Championship Wrestling and the Pennsylvania-based World Xtreme Wrestling.

The Haas brothers began competing for Combat Zone Wrestling (CZW) in November 1999, losing to The King Pinz at The War Begins on November 20, 1999. They competed regularly for CZW throughout early 2000, and won the CZW World Tag Team Championship on February 12 at Climbing The Ladder by defeating The Kashmerino Brothers and The Thrill Kill Kult in a three-way match. On July 10, they lost the championship to The Backseat Boyz at Caged To The End, when Johnny Kashmere defeated Russ in a singles match and was awarded the championship.

After a World Wrestling Federation (WWF) tryout match at Madison Square Garden on August 7, 2000, they signed a developmental contract with WWF the following day. The two worked their way through the tag ranks in the WWF's developmental territories, Memphis Championship Wrestling (MCW) and the Heartland Wrestling Association (HWA). The brothers won the MCW Southern Tag Team Championship three times during early 2001, defeating The Dupps the first time and the Island Boyz and Joey Matthews and Christian York in a three-way match on both the second and third occasions.

== Personal life ==
Haas' grandfather, Hugh Devore, was an assistant with the Houston Oilers and a former head coach of the Notre Dame Fighting Irish. Haas was married to a woman named Deedra.

== Death and tributes ==
On September 24, 2001, Haas had a heart attack. On December 15, 2001, he died of heart failure in his sleep at the age of 27. He was found dead by his wife Deedra shortly after his brother Charlie had left for the night. Haas was buried at Memorial Oaks Cemetery in Houston, Texas.

Following Haas's death, Charlie wrestled by the ring name "R.C. Haas", adding Russ's name in front of his own and initializing both, in tribute to his brother until he was called up to the WWE main roster. Charlie also began wrestling with "RUSS" written on his wrist tape, this act of tribute lasting up to this day. On December 15, 2001, CZW's Cage of Death 3 show had a ten bell salute for Haas, with some wrestlers wearing black armbands, and others taping "RH" on their wrestling boots. On December 17, 2001, on Raw, both Jim Ross and Jerry Lawler paid a small tribute to Haas in the middle of the show. Both William Moody and Kevin Kelly paid tribute to Haas on their websites. On July 17, 2002, first ever Ring of Honor Champion Low Ki dedicated his title win to Haas.

On February 2, 2002, JAPW held the Russ Haas Memorial Show, with the JAPW roster donating their services for the event. In his honor, Mike Bucci and Charlie had the idea to have local indy talent and talent from Ohio Valley Wrestling and World Wrestling Entertainment, who were touched by Haas' death, put on a special tag-team tournament. The Russ Haas Memorial Tag-Team Tournament was held by the small New Jersey–based promotion Phoenix Championship Wrestling on August 31, 2002. There were eight teams in all, but in the end, the team of Bucci and Charlie won the tournament.

Haas was part of the 2004 class of inductees into the ECWA Hall of Fame, with his brother Charlie. On October 27, 2007, Haas posthumously was inducted into the JAPW Hall of Fame.

== Championships and accomplishments ==
- Combat Zone Wrestling
  - CZW Tag Team Championship (1 time) – with Charlie Haas
- East Coast Wrestling Association
  - ECWA Tag Team Championship (1 time) – with Charlie Haas
  - ECWA Hall of Fame (Class of 2004)
- Jersey All Pro Wrestling
  - JAPW Tag Team Championship (2 times) – with Charlie Haas
  - JAPW Hall of Fame (Class of 2007)
- Memphis Championship Wrestling
  - MCW Southern Tag Team Championship (3 times) – with Charlie Haas
- Pennsylvania Championship Wrestling
  - PCW Tag Team Championship (1 time) – with Charlie Haas
- Pro Wrestling Illustrated
  - Ranked No. 130 of the top 500 singles wrestlers in the PWI 500 in 2001.

== See also ==
- 27 Club
- List of premature professional wrestling deaths
