= Hardcore Championship =

Hardcore Championship may refer to:

- WWF Hardcore Championship created 1998, renamed WWE Hardcore Championship in 2002, retired same year
- WCW Hardcore Championship created 21 November 1999, retired in 2001
- ECCW Hardcore Championship created 26 November 1999, still active
- OVW Hardcore Championship created in 2000 retired in 2001, held twice by Randy Orton
- MCW Hardcore Championship created and retired February and June 2001
