= Haas Brothers =

Professional wrestling tag team

Tag team
- Members: Charlie Haas; Russ Haas
- Name(s): Haas Brothers
- Billed heights: Charlie: 6 ft 2 in (1.88 m); Russ: 6 ft 2 in (1.88 m)
- Combined billed weight: 487 lb (221 kg)
- Debut: 1998
- Disbanded: December 15, 2001

The Haas Brothers was a Professional wrestling Tag team consisting of real life brothers Charlie and Russ Haas. The team was very successful in the independent wrestling circuit, but Russ's death on December 15, 2001, led to the end of the tag team shortly after the brothers signed a contract with the World Wrestling Federation.

== History ==
=== Jersey All Pro Wrestling (1998–2000) ===
Charlie and Russ Hass formed a tag team in 1998, The Haas Brothers. They first wrestled in the New Jersey–based independent promotion Jersey All Pro Wrestling (JAPW). The two became successful by winning the vacant JAPW Tag Team Championship on July 22 in a three-way tag team match which also involved Skin Head Express (Lord Zieg and Crazy Ivan) and The Nation of Immigration (Homicide and Kane D). The two dominated the tag team division of JAPW by receiving this victory and this was the first title reign of this successful tag team. They would lose the titles to Nation of Immigration in a weapons match on August 25.

Haas Brothers captured the JAPW Tag Team Championship for a second time on May 21, 1999, facing The Big Unit member Rick Silver in a handicap match. The duo would become stronger than before. Charlie and Russ had many title defenses and they would be successful as they received victories over their opponents. They faced several tag teams in matches and their in-ring ability made them the longest reigning JAPW Tag Team Champions. On February 25, 2000, the Haas Brothers defended the JAPW Tag Team Championship in a three-way tag team match against Da Hit Squad (Mafia and Monsta Mack) and The Big Unit (Rick Silver and Dave Desire). Haas Brothers finally lost the titles to Da Hit Squad. This made them the longest reigning JAPW Tag Team Champions with having a reign of 280 days.

=== Various Promotions (1999–2001) ===
The Haas Brothers debuted in Philadelphia, Pennsylvania–based Hardcore wrestling promotion Combat Zone Wrestling in late 1999. They both captured the CZW Tag Team Championship on February 12 in a four-way match involving the champions The Kashmireno Brothers (Johnny Kashmere and Robbie Mireno), Thrill Kill Kult (Diablos Macabre and Midknight) and Da Hit Squad (Monsta Mack and Mafia). The duo held the titles for four months before losing them to Backseat Boyz (Trent Acid and Johnny Kashmere) on June 12.

During their ECWA and CZW tag title reigns, Haas Brothers also included a third title belt to their waists. They debuted in Pennsylvania Championship Wrestling during spring 2000. They defeated Boogie Woogie Brown and Jeff Peterson to win the PCW Tag Team Championship. The two had a long dominating reign which ended on September 7 when they lost the titles to J.J. Johnson and Cheetah Master in a Two out of three falls match.

In 2000, the Haas Brothers joined Newark, Delaware–based East Coast Wrestling Association where they once again received success in the tag team division of ECWA. In 2000, they defeated The Backseat Boyz (Johnny Kashmere and Trent Acid) to win the ECWA Tag Team Championship. After reigning for a year, the Haas Brothers dropped the ECWA Tag Team Championship to Low Ki and American Dragon on April 7, 2001. Following this loss, the Haas Brothers left the promotion.

=== World Wrestling Federation and developmental territories (2000–2001) ===
After a World Wrestling Federation (WWF) tryout match at Madison Square Garden on August 7, 2000 against The Dupps, they signed a developmental contract with WWF the following day. The two worked their way through the tag ranks in the WWF's developmental territories, Memphis Championship Wrestling (MCW) and the Heartland Wrestling Association (HWA). In WWF they worked in dark matches and house shows having matches against Kai En Tai, the Mean Street Posse, Scott Vick and Steve Bradley, and feuded with the Dupps.

The Haas Brothers made their debut in Memphis, Tennessee–based Memphis Championship Wrestling during early 2001. The duo were successful in MCW capturing the MCW Southern Tag Team Championship three times. Their first reign came on February 21 when they defeated The Dupps (Bo and Jack). On May 25, they lost the titles to The Island Boyz (Ekmo and Kimo) but regained the titles on the same card in a three-way match which involved Island Boyz and the team of Joey Matthews and Christian York. On June 1, they lost the titles once again to Island Boyz but regained it on the same card in a three-way match which involved Island Boyz and the team of Joey Matthews and Christian York. Haas Brothers lost the titles to The A.P.A. (Bradshaw and Farooq) on June 13 and then left the promotion.

The brothers then worked for Heartland Wrestling Association in Cincinnati, Ohio. They defeated Steve Bradley and Rico Constantino at the Brian Pillman Memorial Show. Their last match together was in the WWF on September 18, 2001 when they lost to the Island Boyz in a dark match for Sunday Night Heat.

=== Death of Russ Haas ===
After receiving success in the independent circuit, they made their way to the World Wrestling Federation's developmental territories Heartland Wrestling Association and Ohio Valley Wrestling. The team came to an end on December 15, 2001, when Russ died while suffering from heart problems. In tribute, Charlie began wrestling with "RUSS" written on his wrist tape, and for a time wrestled with the ring name "R.C. Haas" ("R.C." standing for "Russ-Charlie") until the renamed World Wrestling Entertainment called him up to its main television roster on the SmackDown brand.

== Championships and accomplishments ==
- Combat Zone Wrestling
  - CZW Tag Team Championship (1 time)
- East Coast Wrestling Association
  - ECWA Tag Team Championship (1 time)
- Jersey All Pro Wrestling
  - JAPW Tag Team Championship (2 times)
- Mayhem Independent Wrestling
  - MIW Tag Team Championship (1 time)
- Memphis Championship Wrestling
  - MCW Southern Tag Team Championship (3 times)
- Pennsylvania Championship Wrestling
  - PCW Tag Team Championship (1 time)
