= Thrasher (wrestler) =

American professional wrestler (born 1969)

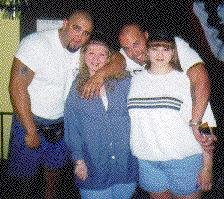
- Mosh (left) and Thrasher (right)

Personal information
- Born: Glenn Ruth; June 13, 1969 (age 57) Camden, New Jersey, U.S.
- Children: 4

Professional wrestling career
- Ring name(s): Frankie Favorite; Glenn Ruth; Guardian #2; The Royal Spider; Sister Angelica; The Spider; Spider #2; Thrasher
- Billed height: 6 ft 4 in (193 cm)
- Billed weight: 245 lb (111 kg)
- Trained by: Larry Sharpe
- Debut: 1990
- Retired: 2000

Glenn Ruth (born June 13, 1969) is an American professional wrestler, better known by the ring name, Thrasher. For much of his career he has teamed with Mosh, most famously as The Headbangers, a pair of metal-heads known for their outrageous costumes such as nose rings and kilts. Thrasher is best known for his stints in the World Wrestling Federation between 1990 and 2000, where he held the WWF World Tag Team Championship and WWF Hardcore Championship.

== Professional wrestling career ==
=== Early career (1990–1996) ===
Ruth grew up in South Jersey. He trained as a wrestler under Larry Sharpe and debuted in 1990 as The Spider. He later became Sharpe's assistant and helped train wrestlers including Big Show and his future tag team partner Mosh at Sharpe's "Monster Factory" professional wrestling school. Worked in New Jersey, for the National Wrestling Alliance. In 1991, Ruth wrestled as Frankie Favorite for All Japan Pro Wrestling. In Japan he would occasionally team up with Johnny Favorite. In 1991 as the Spider, he won the WWA Heavyweight Championship twice in New Jersey from 1991 to 1992 and 1992 to 1993. Also worked in Maryland. On January 23, 1993, the Spider wrestled The Sandman in a Double DQ for Eastern Championship Wrestling. In 1994, he started teaming up with Chaz Warrington as the Spiders working in the independent circuit in New Jersey and Texas. They made a few appearances for Extreme Championship Wrestling in June 1994. In 1995 they moved down to Tennessee for Smoky Mountain Wrestling (SMW). It was there that they changed their gimmicks to the Headbangers. Their slogan was "Real men wear skirts." Ruth became Thrasher and Warrington became Mosh. In December 1995 Smokey Mountain folded and they joined the United States Wrestling Association (USWA). In 1996, the Headbangers became the inaugural HWA Tag Team Champion, but vacated the titles later in the year.

=== World Wrestling Federation (1990, 1991–1993, 1995, 1996–2000) ===
Ruth debuted in the World Wrestling Federation in August 1990 under his real name losing to Rick Rude. He wrestled several matches for the promotion until leaving in November 1990, making several appearances on WWF Superstars and WWF Wrestling Challenge.

Ruth made a number of appearances for the World Wrestling Federation from 1991 to 1993. Losing to the big names; Ric Flair, The Undertaker, Shawn Michaels and Bret Hart. He appeared on the second ever episode of Raw in 1993 a losing effort against Marty Jannetty, competing under his given name as an enhancement talent. Sometimes he even made tag teams appearances against The Smoking Gunns and The Steiner Brothers.

In December 1995, they debuted as jobbers in the WWF as the Spiders, the Royal Spiders, the Arachnoids, and even used their real names. On an episode of Monday Night Raw they got a World Tag Team Title shot against the Smoking Gunns. They returned to the USWA.

Wrestling as "The Spiders", Thrasher and Mosh returned to the WWF on the September 24, 1996, episode of WWF Superstars, losing to The Smoking Gunns. In November 1996, they resumed wrestling as "The Headbangers". At the outset of 1997, The Headbangers briefly began wearing nun outfits and wrestling as "The Flying Nuns" and "The Sisters of Love", with Thrasher wrestling as "Sister Angelica" and Mosh as "Mother Smucker". They were briefly managed by Brother Love.

Thrasher and Mosh returned to wrestling as "The Headbangers" in early 1997. On March 23, at WrestleMania 13, the Headbangers competed in a Four-Way Elimination match to determine the #1 contenders for the WWF Tag Team Championship. They won the match defeating Doug Furnas and Philip LaFon, The Godwinns and The New Blackjacks. The following night on the March 13, 1997, episode of Raw they challenged the WWF Tag Team Champions Owen Hart and the British Bulldog winning via disqualification however they did not win the titles due to champions advantage. In September of that year the current WWF Tag Team Champions Stone Cold Steve Austin and Dude Love vacated their championships due to Austin suffering a neck injury. This led to The Headbangers competing in a four-way elimination match on September 7, 1997, at the Ground Zero: In Your House for vacant WWF World Tag Team Championships. They won the match defeating The Godwinns, The Legion of Doom and the British Bulldog and Owen Hart marking their first and only Tag Team Championship reign. They defended the Tag Team Championships on The September 15, on an episode of Raw against the Bret Hart & The British Bulldog, winning the match via disqualification. On October 5, at Badd Blood: In Your House they lost the titles to The Godwinns putting an end to their 28 day reign.

Thrasher entered the 1998 Royal Rumble and lasted over 10 minutes before being eliminated by Steve Austin. On February 17, 1998, The Headbangers won the NWA World Tag Team Championship from The Rock 'n' Roll Express, which aired on the February 23 edition of Raw Is War. They lost the belts the following month to The Midnight Express. They feuded with The Quebecers and the Oddities throughout the year and become the first Maryland Championship Wrestling Tag Team Champions on August 18, defeating Jimmy Cicero and Julio Sanchez in the finals of a tournament. They later dropped the titles to the dou in a rematch on September 20, ending their reign at 35 days.

In late 1998, The Headbangers started a feud with the WWF Tag Team Champions, the New Age Outlaws. On October 12, during an episode of Raw Thrasher and Mosh attacked Road Dogg by smashing a Boombox over his head. On October 18, The Headbangers challenged the New Age Outlaws at Judgment Day. During the match Road Dogg smashed a boombox over Mosh’s head giving The Headbangers a disqualification victory over the champions. Following the match Thrasher and Mosh declared themselves the "Tag Team Champions of the Universe" and began carrying toy versions of the WWF Tag Team Championships.

The Headbangers split in January 1999 when Ruth suffered a knee injury and Warrington began pursuing a singles career, but reformed in late 1999 on the October 10 edition of Sunday Night Heat when Ruth came to Warrington's aid during a domestic violence angle, which saw him vilified by other wrestlers and officials alike for a number of weeks. Ruth had presented video footage of Warrington's (kayfabe) girlfriend Marianna Komlos putting on makeup to make it seem as if Warrington had been abusing her. The police officers arresting Warrington then uncuffed him and arrested Komlos for her lies. Shortly thereafter the two began appearing regularly as a team again, but were now heels and inexplicably came to the ring wearing cone brassieres which they wore while they wrestled.

In 2000, Ruth took part in the match for the Hardcore Championship at WrestleMania 2000. He held the title for 37 seconds, pinning Joey Abs and then being pinned by Pete Gas. After the Headbangers split for the second time in that July and Warrington went on to team with D'Lo Brown, Ruth continued to wrestle in singles competition mainly on WWF Jakked/Metal before being sent to WWF's Memphis Championship Wrestling developmental territory that summer. He was released from the WWF in December 2000.

=== Independent circuit (2000–2003) ===
After his release from the WWF, Ruth continued to wrestle until 2003 for Maryland Championship Wrestling and independent promotions before retiring from professional wrestling. During this period he captured the MCW Southern Tag Team Championships with his tag team partner Seven.

=== Ring of Honor and return to the independent circuit (2011–present) ===
In 2011, The Headbangers reformed and have been wrestling on the independent circuit once again. In June 2012, Thrasher and Mosh debuted in Ring of Honor as The Guardians of Truth, a masked tag team managed by Truth Martini. As of 2014, Thrasher now wrestles for independent promotion Championship Wrestling Entertainment in Port St. Lucie, FL. On November 14, 2014, Thrasher defeated Chico Adams to become the CWE Heavyweight Champion.

The Headbangers made their debut for Championship Wrestling Entertainment (CWE) competing in a triple threat match at Wrestlefest 2015. In 2016 they made their debut for Fighting Evolution Wrestling (FEW), on January 21, 2017, they won the FEW Tag Team Championships. On March 31, 2017 they defeated Cryme Tyme at Fighting Evolution Wrestling in Orlando, Florida. Later that same year they went Australia to wrestle for World Series Wrestling and feuded with The Basso Brothers. On August 12, they won the FEW Tag Team Championships for a second time defeating Alex G and B. Psi Phi. They would lose the titles to Cool Pimpin on December 16.

Throughout 2019, and 2020, The Headbangers unsuccessfully challenged for the Atomic Revolutionary Wrestling Tag Team Championships on multiple occasions. However on October 23, 2020 they finally won the Championships defeating The Brothers In Arms in a Three Stages of Hell Match.

On November 23, 2021, The Headbangers won the vacant Figure Wrestling Federation Tag Team Championships in a four tag team match defeating The Shook Crew, The Mane Event and Eric James & Jack Tomlinson.

In October 2023, the Headbangers appeared on the NWA pay-per-view Samhain, losing a tag match to The Southern 6 (Kerry Morton and Alex Taylor).

In November 2025, The Headbangers announced their retirement tour would take place throughout 2026, with their retirement match taking place on July 23, at the ISPW Legends event in Wildwood, New Jersey. However due to Mosh suffering an injury in Spring 2026, The Headbangers extended their retirement tour to December. During this retirement tour The Headbangers won multiple championships including United States Wrestling Tag Team Championships, The MCW Tag Team Championships, All Star Wrestling Tag Team Championship and the Noble Champions Group Tag Team Championships.

=== Return to World Wrestling Entertainment (2016) ===
Thrasher and Mosh made an unannounced return to the WWE (formerly WWF) on the 30 August 2016 episode of WWE SmackDown, losing to Heath Slater and Rhyno in the first round of a tournament for the newly-created WWE SmackDown Tag Team Championship. They made two further appearances on SmackDown in November 2016.

In May 2023, it was announced both Thrasher and Mosh signed a legends deal with the WWE.

== Other media ==
Alongside Mosh, he appears in WWF War Zone, WWF Attitude, WWE 2K24 as downloadable contentWWE 2K25.

== Personal life ==
Ruth is married with five children.

Upon retiring from professional wrestling in 2002, Ruth began working in restaurant management and marketing. He has worked as an Area Supervisor for Papa John's in Boynton Beach, Florida and overseen five Domino’s in Southern Maryland. As of 2024, Ruth works as a manager for a gym in Palm Beach, Florida.

== Championships and accomplishments ==
- All-Star Wrestling
  - ASW Tag Team Championship (1 time) — with Mosh
- Atomic Revolutionary Wrestling
  - ARW Hardcore Championship (1 time)
  - ARW Tag Team Championship (1 time) – with Mosh
- Blackburn Wrestling Alliance
  - BWA Tag Team Championship (1 time) – with Greg Spitz
- Championship Wrestling Entertainment
  - CWE Heavyweight Championship (1 time)
- Coastal Championship Wrestling
  - CCW Tag Team Championship (1 time) – with Mosh
- Fighting Evolution Wrestling
  - FEW Bahamas National Championship (1 time)
  - FEW Tag Team Championship (2 times) – with Mosh
- Figure Wrestling Federation
  - FWF Tag Team Championship (1 time) – with Mosh
- Heroes And Legends Wrestling
  - HLW Tag Team Championship (1 time, current) - with Mosh
- Heartland Wrestling Association
  - HWA Tag Team Championship (1 time) – with Mosh
  - HLW Tag Team Championship (1 time, current) – with Mosh
- Insane Championship Wrestling
  - ICW Streetfight Tag Team Championship (1 time) – with Mosh
- Independent Professional Wrestling Alliance
  - IPWA Tag Team Championship (1 time) – with Mosh
- Main Event Championship Wrestling
  - MECW Tag Team Championship (1 time) – with Mosh
- Maryland Championship Wrestling
  - MCW Tag Team Championship (1 time) – with Mosh
- Mid-Eastern Wrestling Federation
  - MEWF Tag Team Championship (1 time) – with Mosh
- Memphis Championship Wrestling
  - MCW Southern Tag Team Championship (1 time) – with Seven
- MCW Pro Wrestling
  - MCW Tag Team Championship (1 time) — with Mosh
- National Wrestling Alliance
  - NWA World Tag Team Championship (1 time) – with Mosh
- National Wrestling League
  - NWL Tag Team Championship (1 time) – with Mosh
- New England Wrestling Federation
  - NEWF Tag Team Championship (3 times) – with Mosh
- Noble Champions Group
  - NCG Tag Team Championship (1 time, current) - with Mosh
- Pro Wrestling Illustrated
  - PWI ranked him # 110 of the Top 500 singles wrestlers in the PWI 500 in 1997.
- Texas Wrestling Alliance
  - TWA Tag Team Championship (1 time) – with Mosh
- World Wrestling Association (New Jersey)
  - WWA Heavyweight Championship (2 times)
  - WWA Tag Team Championship (1 time) – with Spider #2
- United States Wrestling
  - USW Tag Team Championship (1 time) — with Mosh
- World Wrestling Federation
  - WWF Hardcore Championship (1 time)
  - WWF World Tag Team Championship (1 time) – with Mosh
- Wrestling For Charity
  - WFC Tag Team Championship (1 time) – with Mosh

== See also ==
- The Headbangers
