= Pete Gas =

American professional wrestler (born 1970)

Pete Gasparino
Personal information
- Born: Peter John Gasparino; May 29, 1970 (age 56) Greenwich, Connecticut, U.S.
- Education: University of Connecticut

Professional wrestling career
- Ring name: Pete Gas
- Billed height: 6 ft 4 in (193 cm)
- Billed weight: 265 lb (120 kg)
- Billed from: Greenwich, Connecticut
- Trained by: Tom Prichard
- Debut: 1999
- Retired: December 10, 2007

Peter John Gasparino (born May 29, 1970) is an American retired professional wrestler, better known by his ring name, Pete Gas. He is best known for his appearances with the World Wrestling Federation between 1999 and 2001 as a member of the Mean Street Posse.

== Early life ==
Gasparino grew up in Greenwich, Connecticut. He attended Greenwich High School, where he was a friend of Shane McMahon, the son of the chairman of the World Wrestling Federation. He went on to attend the University of Connecticut on an athletic scholarship, playing football for the Connecticut Huskies. After graduating, Gasparino spoke to McMahon in 1992 about becoming a professional wrestler, but McMahon discouraged him. Gasparino instead went into business, eventually joining Lightnin Rentals, a film production equipment hire company, in New York City.

== Professional wrestling career ==
=== World Wrestling Federation (1999–2001) ===
==== Mean Street Posse (1999–2000) ====
In early-1999, Shane McMahon asked Gasparino and their mutual friend Rodney Leinhardt to film a series of vignettes about their upbringing in Greenwich to promote his match with X-Pac at WrestleMania XV. The tongue-in-cheek vignettes bragged about the toughness of McMahon and his friends from the "mean streets" of Greenwich. Renamed "Pete Gas", Gasparino (along with Rodney and two other childhood friends of Shane, "Billy P" and "Willie Greene") made his live debut in the WWF on the March 22, 1999 episode of Raw, interfering in a street fight between McMahon and X-Pac. Dubbed the "Mean Street Posse", Gas and the others went on to appear in McMahon's corner at WrestleMania XV on March 28, 1999, helping him defeat X-Pac.

After Gas and Rodney had made several appearances with the WWF, they were offered one-year contracts. Gas left his job, becoming a full-time performer with the WWF. He was trained as a wrestler by Tom Prichard. Playing on their "preppy" image, the Posse members wrestled in argyle sweater vests and khakis. Inspired by the Socs, a gang of wealthy teenagers from the 1983 film The Outsiders, the Mean Street Posse were comedic villains: "the rich kids that everyone hated".

Following WrestleMania XV, the Mean Street Posse were drawn into the feud between Shane McMahon and his father Vince, resulting in them facing Vince McMahon's "stooges", Gerald Brisco and Pat Patterson in a series of matches. On the April 29, 1999 episode of Smackdown, the Mean Street Posse became members of The Corporate Ministry. On the May 10, 1999 episode of Raw, Gas and Rodney lost to Brisco and Patterson in a loser leaves town match. The television ratings for the segment the match appeared in were at that time the highest ever recorded for a WWF television program. They returned on the June 7, 1999 episode of Raw. On June 21, 1999, Gas and Rodney were joined by Joey Abs, turning the Mean Street Posse from a tag team into a stable. Unlike Gas and Rodney, Abs was not a childhood friend of Shane McMahon; instead, he was an experienced wrestler added to the group as a ringer.

In July 1999, Shane McMahon and the Mean Street Posse began feuding with Test after he began dating McMahon's sister Stephanie. This culminated in a "love her or leave her" match between McMahon and Test at SummerSlam on August 22, 1999, with Test to end his relationship with Stephanie if he lost and McMahon to drop his opposition to the relationship if he lost. Test defeated McMahon despite the efforts of the Posse, who were seated at ringside. McMahon reconciled with Test on the September 9 episode of Smackdown, but the Posse refused to do likewise, resulting in them ending their alliance with McMahon after he rescued Test from an attack at their hands on the September 13, 1999 episode of Raw.

After parting ways with McMahon, the Posse were briefly managed by Terri Runnels before allying with The British Bulldog. On November 14, 1999, at Survivor Series, The British Bulldog and the Mean Street Posse lost to Gangrel, Mark Henry, Steve Blackman, and Val Venis in the titular match.

On December 12, 1999, at Armageddon, the Mean Street Posse took part in a tag team battle royal to become number one contenders to the WWF Tag Team Championship. They gained an advantage by switching places with the third wrestler behind the referees' backs, thus enabling them to outnumber the other teams three to two, but nonetheless failed to win.

In early 2000, the Posse repeatedly tried to defeat Crash Holly for the Hardcore Championship, attacking the champion in unlikely venues such as an airport, a circus, and his hotel room. At WrestleMania 2000 on April 2, the trio took part in a hardcore battle royal for the title. During the match, each member would briefly hold the title, although Hardcore Holly ultimately won the match and left as the official champion.

On an episode of Sunday Night Heat in October 2000, Edge and Christian briefly became the managers of the Mean Street Posse. They accompanied them to ringside for the duration of their WWF World Tag Team Championship title match with the Hardy Boyz, assisting the Posse with the proviso that they would receive a title shot if the Posse was to win. The Hardy Boyz thwarted the interference of Edge and Christian, however, and retained their titles.

==== Developmental territories (2000–2001) ====
In mid-2000, Gas and the other Posse members were sent to Memphis Championship Wrestling, the WWF's developmental territory in Memphis, Tennessee, for seasoning. The trio trained in Memphis from Wednesday to Sunday then joined the rest of the roster for Raw and SmackDown tapings on Monday and Tuesday. Gas and Rodney won the MCW Southern Tag Team Championship in May 2000, defeating Bull Pain and Todd Morton. They lost the championship to The Kingpins in July 2000, but regained them the following month. Their second reign ended in October 2000 when they lost to The Dupps.

During his time in Memphis, Gas also wrestled for Power Pro Wrestling, another Memphis-based independent promotion affiliated with the WWF. In March 2001, he won the PPP Heavyweight Championship. The championship was abandoned later the same month when Power Pro Wrestling closed.

After several months in Memphis, Gas was sent to Puerto Rico. He and the other Posse members were released by the WWF in June 2001.

=== Independent Circuit (2001-2003) ===
After WWF, Gas went on to briefly wrestle on the independent circuit until 2003. His last match was on September 6, 2003, losing to Prince Nana in the East Coast Wrestling Association in Wilmington, Delaware.

=== Retirement ===
After retiring from professional wrestling, Gasparino worked as a bond broker. In 2003, he began working for the office supply company W.B. Mason as a sales representative.

Gasparino broke his retirement in 2007, he appeared on the 15th anniversary episode of Raw, competing in a Battle Royal, where he was eliminated by Bart Gunn. In 2016, Gasparino made several appearances on The Edge and Christian Show, a sketch comedy show on the WWE Network hosted by current wrestlers Christian and Edge. In 2017, he published his autobiography: Looking at the Lights: My Path from Fan to a Wrestling Heel.

== Bibliography ==
- Looking at the Lights: My Path from Fan to a Wrestling Heel (2017) – with Jon Robinson

== Championships and accomplishments ==
- Memphis Championship Wrestling
  - MCW Southern Tag Team Championship (2 times) – with Rodney
- Power Pro Wrestling
  - PPP Heavyweight Championship (1 time)
- World Wrestling Federation
  - WWF Hardcore Championship (2 times)
