= Rodney (wrestler) =

American professional wrestler (born 1971)

Personal information
- Born: Rodney Lienhardt; January 1, 1971 (age 55) Greenwich, Connecticut, U.S
- Children: 2

Professional wrestling career
- Ring name(s): Rodney; RodRageous
- Billed height: 6 ft 0 in (183 cm)
- Billed weight: 230 lb (104 kg)
- Billed from: Greenwich, Connecticut
- Trained by: Tom Prichard
- Debut: March 22, 1999
- Retired: June 2001

Rodney Lienhardt (born January 1, 1971) is an American retired professional wrestler. He is best known for his appearances with the World Wrestling Federation from 1999 to 2001 under the ring name Rodney, a member of the Mean Street Posse.

== Early life ==
Lienhardt was a childhood friend of Shane McMahon, the son of World Wrestling Federation owner Vince McMahon. Lienhardt and Shane attended junior high together in Greenwich, Connecticut, befriending Pete Gasparino in high school, where the trio played American football. After graduating from high school, Lienhardt and Gasparino would exercise at the WWF gym in Stamford, Connecticut.

== Professional wrestling career ==
In 1999, Shane McMahon invited Lienhardt and Gasparino to appear on WWF television as part of an angle. Lienhardt (known simply as "Rodney") and Gasparino (renamed "Pete Gas") debuted on WWF television on the March 22, 1999, episode of Raw is War as part of a stable known as the "Mean Street Posse", and began assisting Shane in his feud with Test and helping him retain the WWF European Championship. Joey Abs was added to the faction three months later. Shane eventually turned face and briefly feuded with his former allies before leaving WWF television.

The Mean Street Posse took part in a tag team battle royal for the number one contendership to the WWF World Tag Team Championship at Armageddon 1999, and gained an advantage by switching places with the third wrestler behind the referees' backs, thus enabling them to outnumber the other teams three to two. Despite this advantage, they failed to win and were the first team eliminated.

In early 2000, the Mean Street Posse repeatedly tried to defeat Crash Holly for the WWF Hardcore Championship, attacking the champion in unlikely venues such as an airport, a circus and his hotel room. At WrestleMania 2000 on April 2, the trio took part in a Hardcore battle royal for the Hardcore Championship. Lienhardt pinned Funaki to win the title after stunning him by throwing him into a metal fence railing, but was pinned by Abs just fourteen seconds later. Despite the infighting, the Mean Street Posse remained a relatively cohesive unit. On an episode of Sunday Night Heat on October 3, 2000, Edge and Christian briefly became the managers of the Mean Street Posse. They accompanied them to ringside for the duration of their WWF World Tag Team Championship title match with the Hardy Boyz, assisting the Mean Street Posse with the proviso that they would receive a title shot if the posse was to win. The Hardy Boyz, however, thwarted the interference of Edge and Christian and retained their titles. Rodney's last televised match in WWF was a lost to Al Snow on November 27, 2000, on Jakked (aired December 2, 2000). His last WWF match was a loss to Raven on January 9, 2001, at a dark match for Sunday Night Heat.

Later that year, all three members of the Mean Street Posse were sent to Memphis Championship Wrestling, then a WWF developmental territory. On May 24, 2000, in Tunica, Mississippi, Lienhardt and Abs defeated Bull Pain and Todd Morton to win the MCW Southern Tag Team Championship. They lost the titles to The Kingpins on July 26 in Memphis, Tennessee, but regained the titles on August 12, 2000, in Jackson, Mississippi. Their second reign ended when they were defeated by the Dupps on October 28 in Jonesboro, Arkansas.

Lienhardt was then sent to the MCW affiliate Memphis Power Pro Wrestling, where he was renamed "RodRageous". He defeated Bulldog Raines to win the MPPW Television Championship on January 27, 2001, in Memphis, Tennessee. He lost the title to Grandmaster Sexay on February 21 of that year in Jonesboro, but regained the title just three days later in Memphis. His second reign came to an end on March 17, 2001, when MPPW severed all connection with the WWF and vacated all titles held by WWF employees. Lienhardt and the remainder of the Posse were released by the WWF in June 2001.

== Personal life ==
Lienhardt is married with two daughters. After retiring from wrestling he began running a landscaping company in Glen Ridge, New Jersey.

Lienhardt is mentioned in Pete Gas's autobiography Looking at the Lights: My Path from Fan to a Wrestling Heel in 2017. The book covers stories about the Posse, in ring and outside the ring events.

== Championships and accomplishments ==
- Memphis Championship Wrestling
  - MCW Southern Tag Team Championship (2 times) - with Pete Gas
- Memphis Power Pro Wrestling
  - MPPW Television Championship (2 times)
- Pro Wrestling Illustrated
  - PWI ranked him #219 of the Top 500 singles wrestlers in the PWI 500 in 2001
- World Wrestling Federation
  - WWF Hardcore Championship (1 time)
