= Memphis Championship Wrestling =

American professional wrestling promotion

- Acronym: MCW
- Founded: February 20, 2000
- Defunct: c. 2001
- Style: Rasslin'
- Headquarters: Memphis, Tennessee, United States
- Owner: Terry Golden
- Predecessor: United States Wrestling Association; Kick-Ass Wrestling
- Successor: Memphis Wrestling

Memphis Championship Wrestling (MCW) was a professional wrestling promotion run by Terry Golden, based in Memphis, Tennessee. The promotion's first event was on February 20, 2000, and it remained active until mid-2001. It was employed as a World Wrestling Federation (WWF) developmental territory.

== History ==
Terry Golden originally opened his Memphis-based promotion as Kick-Ass Wrestling, and it was later renamed to Memphis Championship Wrestling (MCW).

During June 2001 after the World Wrestling Federation (WWF) purchased World Championship Wrestling (WCW), the WWF dropped MCW as one their official developmental territories. Wrestlers were either sent to other developmental territories or fired, but they had to perform in the remaining scheduled MCW shows per their contracts.

== Unleashed ==
MCW's television show Unleashed! aired on WLMT-TV every Saturday morning at 11:00 am and early Sunday morning at 1:30 am. The show was hosted by Lance Russell, David Webb, David Jett, with Kevin Kelly also later hosting.

After the promotion closed, the MCW television show was made up of candid interviews with many of the departing talents. Later, these television shows were made up of old replays before it was eventually dropped by the television station.

== Championships ==
Championship	Final champion(s)	Reign	Date won	Days held	Location	Notes	Ref.
MCW Southern Heavyweight Championship	Steven Dunn	1	May 11, 2001	—N/a	Memphis, Tennessee		
MCW Hardcore Championship	Joey Abs	1	May 11, 2001	>1	Coldwater, Mississippi		
MCW Southern Tag Team Championship	The Island Boyz (Ekmo and Kimo)	3	June 14, 2001	—N/a	Jonesboro, Arkansas		
MCW Southern Light Heavyweight Championship	Spanky	3	May 11, 2001	21	Coldwater, Mississippi		

== Alumni ==
- Joey Abs
- Shooter Shultz
- Jason Sensation
- Curtis Hughes
- Reckless Youth
- American Dragon
- The Blue Meanie
- Jasmin St. Claire
- Bill Dundee
- Steve Bradley
- Kurt Angle
- Triple H
- Shawn Michaels
- Bradshaw
- Lance Cade
- Bo Dupp
- Jack Dupp
- Ekmo
- Faarooq
- Pete Gas
- Road Dogg
- Charlie Haas
- Russ Haas
- Spike Dudley
- Kevin Kelly
- Kimo
- K-Krush/R-Truth
- Jerry Lawler
- Joey Matthews
- Jim Neidhart
- Bull Pain
- Lord Steven Regal
- Robbie Brookside
- Rodrageous
- Lance Russell
- Seven
- Chris Benoit
- Spanky
- Victoria
- Christian York
- The Kat
- Thrasher
- Scott Vick
- Tracy Smothers
- Just Joe
- Viscera
- Bobby Eaton
- Molly Holly
- Stevie Richards
- Spike Dudley
- Scotty 2 Hotty
- Brian Christopher
- Raven
- Jerry Lynn
- Ivory
- Dustin Diamond
- Brickhouse Brown
- Rikishi
- Reggie B. Fine
- Tattoo
- Bobcat
- Gangsta B.I.G.
- Downtown Bruno
- Bruce Prichard
- Taz
- Simon Diamond
- Dawn Marie
- Greg Anthony
- Motley Cruz
- Playa Tyrone
- David Lee Mullett
- Ronnie James Mullett
- Todd Morton
- Danny B
- Chris Rocker
- Bitty Little
- Doctor Bud
- Izzy High
- Randall Collins
- Tyler Gates
- Hollywood Little
- Chip Diver
- Alkie Holic
- Ref. Mike Darby
- Stoney McGraw

Tag Teams

- The Mullett's (David Lee & Ronnie James)
- The Kingpinz (Price & Schaffer)
- The APA (Faarooq & Bradshaw)
- The Dupps (Bo & Jack Dupp)
- Haas Brothers (Russ & Charlie)
- The Island Boyz (Ekmo & Kimo)
- Joey Matthews & Christian York
- The Mean Street Posse (Joey Abs, Pete Gas & Rodney)
- The New Foundation (Blue Meanie & Jim Neidhart)

== See also ==
- List of independent wrestling promotions in the United States
