= MCW Southern Tag Team Championship =

Professional wrestling tag team championship

Details
- Promotion: Memphis Championship Wrestling
- Date established: February 26, 2000
- Date retired: June 14, 2001
Statistics
- First champions: The New Foundation (The Blue Meanie and Jim Neidhart)
- Final champions: The Island Boyz (Ekmo and Kimo)
- Most reigns: The Island Boyz (3 reigns)

The MCW Southern Tag Team Championship was the tag team title in Memphis Championship Wrestling from 2000 until the promotion closed in 2002.

== Title history ==
Wrestlers:	Times:	Date:	Location:	Notes:
The New Foundation (The Blue Meanie and Jim Neidhart)	1	2000-02-26	Memphis, Tennessee	Meanie and Neidhart were the final two men left in a battle royal and were declared as the first champions.
Todd Morton and Bull Pain	1	2000-04-12	Robinsonville, Mississippi	
The Mean Street Posse (Joey Abs and Rodney)	1	2000-05-24	Tunica, Mississippi	
The Kingpins (Price and Schaffer)	1	2000-07-26	Memphis, Tennessee	
The Mean Street Posse (Joey Abs and Rodney)	2	2000-08-12	Jackson, Mississippi	
The Dupps (Bo Dupp and Jack Dupp)	1	2000-10-28	Jonesboro, Arkansas	
The Triad (Seven and Thrash)	1	2000-11-18	Newbern, Tennessee	Defeated Jack Dupp and Joey Abs, subbing for Bo Dupp.
American Dragon and Spanky	1	2000-12-01	Manila, Arkansas	
The Dupps (Bo Dupp and Jack Dupp)	2	2001-01-13	Corinth, Mississippi	Defeated Spanky and Shooter Schultz, subbing for American Dragon.
The Haas Brothers (Charlie and Russ Haas)	1	2001-02-21	Jonesboro, Arkansas	
The Island Boyz (Ekmo and Kimo)	1	2001-05-25	Marmaduke, Arkansas	
The Haas Brothers (Charlie and Russ Haas)	2	2001-05-25	Marmaduke, Arkansas	Defeated The Island Boyz and Joey Matthews and Christian York in a three-way match.
The Island Boyz (Ekmo and Kimo)	2	2001-06-01	Marmaduke, Arkansas	
The Haas Brothers (Charlie and Russ Haas)	3	2001-06-01	Marmaduke, Arkansas	Defeated The Island Boyz and Joey Matthews and Christian York in a three-way match.
A.P.A. (Bradshaw and Faarooq)	1	2001-06-13	Poplar Bluff, Missouri	
The Island Boyz (Ekmo and Kimo)	3	2001-06-14	Jonesboro, Arkansas	
The title was abandoned when MCW closed in 2002.

== See also ==
- Memphis Championship Wrestling
