= OMEGA Tag Team Championship =

Professional wrestling tag team championship

Details
- Promotion: Organization of Modern Extreme Grappling Arts
- Date established: December 5, 1997
- Current champion(s): The Broken Hardys ("Broken" Matt Hardy and Brother Nero)
- Date won: January 29, 2017
Statistics
- First champion(s): The Serial Thrillaz (Mike Maverick and Shane Helms)
- Most reigns: As tag team: The Broken Hardys ("Broken" Matt Hardy and Brother Nero) and The Serial Thrillaz (Mike Maverick and Shane Helms) (2 reigns); As individual: Mike Maverick (3 reigns)
- Longest reign: The Broken Hardys ("Broken" Matt Hardy and Brother Nero) (2,978+ days)
- Shortest reign: Mike Maverick and Otto Schwanz (62 - 92 days)
- Oldest champion: Otto Schwanz (26 years, 300 days)
- Youngest champion: Brother Nero/Jeff Hardy (20 years, 327 days)

The OMEGA Tag Team Championship is the top tag team title in the Organization of Modern Extreme Grappling Arts independent professional wrestling promotion.

== Title history ==
As of March 26, 2025.

No.	Overall reign number
Reign	Reign number for the specific champion
Days	Number of days held
+	Current reign is changing daily

No.	Team	Reign	Date	Days held	Location	Event	Notes
1	The Serial Thrillaz (Mike Maverick and Shane Helms)	1	December 5, 1997		Southern Pines, NC	N/A	Records unclear as to whom they defeated to become inaugural champions.
2	The Hardy Boyz (Jeff Hardy and Matt Hardy)	1	July 24, 1998	189	Sanford, NC	N/A	
3	The Serial Thrillaz (Mike Maverick and Shane Helms)	2	January 29, 1999	183	Wendell, NC	N/A	Defeated the Hardyz in their last match before leaving OMEGA for the WWE
4	Mike Maverick (3) and Otto Schwanz	1	July 31, 1999	62 – 92	Beulaville, NC	N/A	Schwanz replaced Helms, who had left OMEGA for NWA Wildside.
—	Retired	—	October 1999	—	N/A	N/A	Title retired when the promotion closed.
5	The Broken Hardys ("Broken" Matt Hardy and Brother Nero)	2	January 29, 2017	2,978+	Gibsonville, NC	Omega Bowl	This was a three-Way match also including Roy Wilkins/Arik Royal and John Skyler/C. W. Anderson.

== Combined reigns ==
As of March 26, 2025.

=== By team ===
†	Indicates the current champion

Rank	Team	No. of reigns	Combined days
1	The Hardy Boyz/The Broken Hardys (Matt Hardy/"Broken" Matt Hardy and Jeff Hardy/Brother Nero) †	2	3167+
2	The Serial Thrillaz (Mike Maverick and Shane Helms)	2	414
3	Mike Maverick and Otto Schwanz	1	62-92

=== By Wrestler ===
Rank	Wrestler	No. of reigns	Combined days
1	Surge/Matt Hardy/"Broken" Matt Hardy †	2	3167+
1	Jeff Hardy/Brother Nero †	2	3167+
3	Mike Maverick	3	476-506
4	Shane Helms	2	414
5	Otto Schwanz	1	62-92
