= Mean Street Posse =

Professional wrestling stable

Stable
- Members: Shane McMahon (occasional leader/mouthpiece); Pete Gas; Rodney; Joey Abs
- Name: Mean Street Posse
- Billed from: Mean Streets of Greenwich, Connecticut
- Former members: Billy Pete; Willie Greene; Sir Horowitz
- Debut: March 22, 1999
- Disbanded: June 2001
- Years active: 1999–2001

The Mean Street Posse was a short-lived professional wrestling stable in the World Wrestling Federation. The group consisted of Pete Gas, Rodney, occasionally Shane McMahon serving as the hype man/leader and Joey Abs. The Posse's gimmick was that they were friends of Shane McMahon from the "mean streets" of Greenwich, Connecticut, and were from a similarly upper class background (excluding Shane). This was emphasized by their attire of sweater vests and dress pants.

== History ==
Gas and Rodney were legitimate school friends of Shane McMahon, whereas Joey Abs was already a professional wrestler who was brought in to be the 'worker' of the group. The Posse was closely allied with Shane McMahon, often helping him defend the European Championship throughout early 1999. At the beginning, the group also featured other members named Willie Green, Billy Pete and Sir Horowitz. It is unknown as to why they were pulled from the group, and who portrayed them remains largely unknown also. They were only ever featured in sporadic backstage segments and in the crowd for WrestleMania XV. The new three membered Posse attempted to help McMahon defeat Test at SummerSlam, but were unsuccessful. After they turned on Shane, the Posse were relegated to being enhancement talents, losing to teams such as the Dudley Boyz, The Holly Cousins and Too Cool. Despite this, Gas would manage to briefly hold the Hardcore Championship. At WrestleMania 2000, all three members of the Posse would briefly win the Hardcore Title. They then began a short-lived program with Edge and Christian, in which the Posse was hired to steal the Tag Team Championship from the Hardy Boyz. On the October 8, 2000 episode of Sunday Night Heat, Gas and Rodney faced the Hardy Boyz for the title, but they were unsuccessful. Abs was then involved in a short-lived storyline with Stephanie McMahon, where it was revealed that they were ex-lovers.

=== Split and aftermath ===
In 2000, the entire Posse was moved to Memphis Championship Wrestling, a developmental territory of the WWF. While in MCW, the Posse managed to win several titles before being released from their contracts in June 2001. After their release from WWF, Rodney and Abs retired from wrestling. Gas wrestled until 2003.

On December 10, 2007, Raw held its 15th-anniversary special and Gas represented the Posse in a 15th Anniversary Battle Royal, where he was subsequently eliminated by Bart Gunn.

In 2009, WWE.com interviewed the Posse as a part of the website's "Where are They Now?" feature. All three members have since retired from wrestling, as Gas now works for W.B. Mason, an office supply company, Rodney owns his own landscape management company in Glen Ridge, New Jersey and Abs works in his family's car repair shop.

Pete Gas released his autobiography Looking at the Lights: My Path from Fan to a Wrestling Heel in 2017. The book covers stories about the Posse, in ring and outside the ring events.

== Championships and accomplishments ==
- Memphis Championship Wrestling
  - MCW Hardcore Championship (1 time) – Abs
  - MCW Southern Heavyweight Championship (2 times) – Abs
  - MCW Southern Tag Team Championship (2 times) – Abs and Rodney
- World Wrestling Federation
  - WWF Hardcore Championship (4 times)^{1} – Gas (2), Rodney (1), Abs (1)

^{1}Due to inconsistent reports from WWE, Gas' additional reign and both Abs' and Rodney's during WrestleMania 2000 are considered unofficial as they are not featured in their online history for the title, but are listed in the title's history in the "WWE Encyclopedia: The Definitive Guide to World Wrestling Entertainment" published in 2009.
