= List of WWE Hardcore Champions =

Listing of professional wrestling champions for the Hardcore Championship

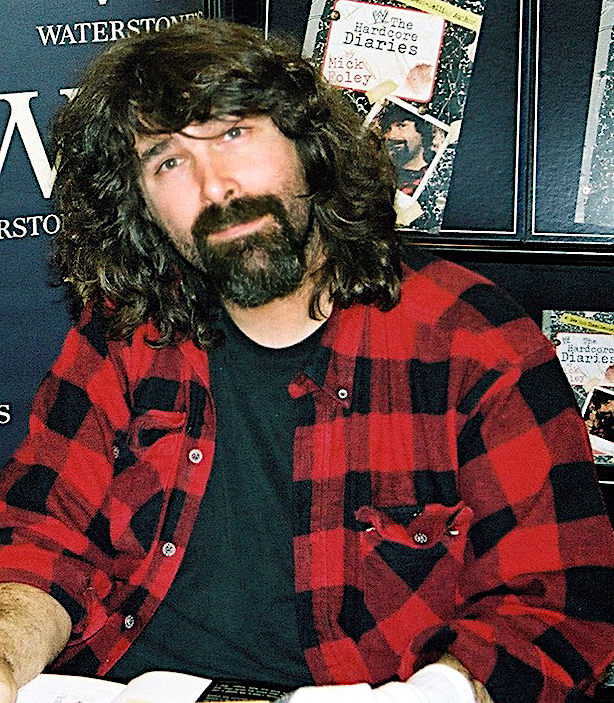
Mick Foley, who wrestled as "Mankind" in 1998, was the first Hardcore Champion

The WWE Hardcore Championship was a professional wrestling championship contested for in the United States–based World Wrestling Entertainment (WWE) promotion, formerly known as the World Wrestling Federation (WWF) before May 2002. The title was only contestable in matches under hardcore regulations, and could be won only by individual wrestlers. As a professional wrestling championship, it was introduced by the WWF on its television program Raw Is War on November 2, 1998, in which WWF chairman Mr. McMahon awarded Mankind the title. In 2000, the WWF instated the "24/7 rule", a regulation stating that the title could be defended anywhere at any time as long as a referee was present, which led to numerous title changes in shorter time periods; the rule was discontinued in 2002. On the August 26, 2002 episode of Raw, Intercontinental Champion Rob Van Dam defeated Hardcore Champion Tommy Dreamer to unify both titles; the Hardcore Championship was retired shortly thereafter. The title was reactivated on two occasions afterwards, although they are not considered official reigns by WWE according to their official title history. On the June 23, 2003 episode of Raw, Mick Foley (who was the first champion as "Mankind") was awarded the Hardcore Championship belt by the Raw brand authority figure Stone Cold Steve Austin for his contributions in hardcore wrestling. Edge and Foley then introduced themselves as co-holders of the championship in 2006, due to a storyline with alumni of the hardcore wrestling-based Extreme Championship Wrestling (ECW) promotion.

Over the course of the title's 3 year, 9 month, and 25 day history, there were 230 title reigns shared among 52 wrestlers. Raven has the most reigns as champion, with 39. Big Boss Man's fourth reign was the longest in the title's history, at 97 days. Steve Blackman ranks first in combined reigns by length, at 172 days in six reigns. Blackman also held the record for the longest title reign under the "24/7 Rule" at 89 days, which was the 2nd longest. Due to the "24/7 rule" numerous wrestlers held the title less than one day, and because the exact times at which each wrestler held the title is unknown, it is impossible to determine who had the shortest reign. Each reign was won at WWF/E-promoted events: pay-per-view events, house shows, and on televised events.

== Reigns ==
=== Names ===
Name	Time of use
WWF Hardcore Championship	November 2, 1998 – May 6, 2002
WWE Hardcore Championship	May 6, 2002 – August 26, 2002

=== Reigns ===
Key
No.	Overall reign number
Reign	Reign number for the specific champion
Days	Number of days held

No.	Champion	Championship change			Reign statistics		Notes	Ref.
No.	Champion	Date	Event	Location	Reign	Days	Notes	Ref.
World Wrestling Federation (WWF)
1	Mankind	November 2, 1998	Raw is War	Houston, Texas	1	28	WWF Chairman Vince McMahon awarded Mankind with the title.	
2	Big Boss Man	November 30, 1998	Raw is War	Baltimore, Maryland	1	15	This was a ladder match	
3	Road Dogg	December 15, 1998	Raw is War	Spokane, Washington	1	61	Aired on tape delay on December 21, 1998. WWE.com mistakenly list this reign as lasting 302 days, ending on October 14, 1999.	
—	Vacated	February 14, 1999	St. Valentine's Day Massacre: In Your House	Memphis, Tennessee	—	—	Road Dogg was forced to vacate title on February 14, 1999 due to injuries sustained during a backstage attack.	
4	Bob Holly	February 14, 1999	St. Valentine's Day Massacre: In Your House	Memphis, Tennessee	1	29	Defeated Al Snow to win the vacant championship.	
5	Billy Gunn	March 15, 1999	Raw is War	San Jose, California	1	13		
6	Hardcore Holly	March 28, 1999	WrestleMania XV	Philadelphia, Pennsylvania	2	28	This was a triple threat match also involving Al Snow.	
7	Al Snow	April 25, 1999	Backlash	Providence, Rhode Island	1	91		
8	Big Boss Man	July 25, 1999	Fully Loaded	Buffalo, New York	2	28		
9	Al Snow	August 22, 1999	SummerSlam	Minneapolis, Minnesota	2	2		
10	Big Boss Man	August 24, 1999	SmackDown!	Kansas City, Missouri	3	14	Aired on tape delay on August 26, 1999.	
11	The British Bulldog	September 7, 1999	SmackDown!	Albany, New York	1	0	Aired on tape delay on September 9, 1999.	
12	Al Snow	September 7, 1999	SmackDown!	Albany, New York	3	35	The British Bulldog awarded the title to Al Snow. Aired on tape delay on September 9, 1999.	
13	Big Boss Man	October 12, 1999	SmackDown!	Birmingham, Alabama	4	97	This was a triple threat match also involving Big Show. Aired on tape delay on October 14, 1999.	
14	Test	January 17, 2000	Raw is War	New Haven, Connecticut	1	36		
15	Crash Holly	February 22, 2000	SmackDown!	Nashville, Tennessee	1	20	The 24/7 rule was applied to the championship; it could be won at any time and anywhere as long as a referee was present. Aired on tape delay on February 24, 2000.	
16	Pete Gas	March 13, 2000	Raw is War	Newark, New Jersey	1	0	Won in Newark Airport. The first title change under the 24/7 rule.	
17	Crash Holly	March 13, 2000	Raw is War	Newark, New Jersey	2	20	Won in Newark Airport.	
18	Tazz	April 2, 2000	WrestleMania 2000	Anaheim, California	1	0	Won during 13 man Hardcore Battle Royal. (Note: Due to inconsistent reports from WWE, these reigns are considered unofficial as they are not featured in their online history for the title, but are listed in the title's history in the "WWE Encyclopedia: The Definitive Guide to World Wrestling Entertainment" published in 2009.)	
19	Viscera	April 2, 2000	WrestleMania 2000	Anaheim, California	1	0	Won during 13 man Hardcore Battle Royal.	
20	Funaki	April 2, 2000	WrestleMania 2000	Anaheim, California	1	0	Won during 13 man Hardcore Battle Royal.	
21	Rodney	April 2, 2000	WrestleMania 2000	Anaheim, California	1	0	Won during 13 man Hardcore Battle Royal.	
22	Joey Abs	April 2, 2000	WrestleMania 2000	Anaheim, California	1	0	Won during 13 man Hardcore Battle Royal.	
23	Thrasher	April 2, 2000	WrestleMania 2000	Anaheim, California	1	0	Won during 13 man Hardcore Battle Royal.	
24	Pete Gas	April 2, 2000	WrestleMania 2000	Anaheim, California	2	0	Won during 13 man Hardcore Battle Royal.	
25	Tazz	April 2, 2000	WrestleMania 2000	Anaheim, California	2	0	Won during 13 man Hardcore Battle Royal.	
26	Crash Holly	April 2, 2000	WrestleMania 2000	Anaheim, California	3	0	Won during 13 man Hardcore Battle Royal.	
27	Hardcore Holly	April 2, 2000	WrestleMania 2000	Anaheim, California	3	1	Won during 13 man Hardcore Battle Royal.	
28	Crash Holly	April 3, 2000	Raw is War	Los Angeles, California	4	8		
29	Perry Saturn	April 11, 2000	SmackDown!	Tampa, Florida	1	0	Aired on tape delay on April 13, 2000.	
30	Tazz	April 11, 2000	SmackDown!	Tampa, Florida	3	0	Aired on tape delay on April 13, 2000.	
31	Crash Holly	April 11, 2000	SmackDown!	Tampa, Florida	5	13	Aired on tape delay on April 13, 2000.	
32	Matt Hardy	April 24, 2000	Raw is War	Raleigh, North Carolina	1	1		
33	Crash Holly	April 25, 2000	SmackDown!	Charlotte, North Carolina	6	11	Pinned Matt Hardy during a title defense against Jeff Hardy. Aired on tape delay on April 27, 2000.	
34	The British Bulldog	May 6, 2000	Insurrextion	London, England	2	3		
35	Crash Holly	May 9, 2000	SmackDown!	New Haven, Connecticut	7	6	Pinned The British Bulldog during a title defense title against Hardcore Holly. Aired on May 11, 2000.	
36	Godfather's Ho	May 15, 2000	Raw is War	Cleveland, Ohio	1	0	Pinned Crash Holly during a title defense against The Godfather; title reign lasted 15 seconds.	
37	Crash Holly	May 15, 2000	Raw is War	Cleveland, Ohio	8	1	Pinned Godfather's Ho in the same match to regain the title.	
38	Gerald Brisco	May 16, 2000	SmackDown!	Detroit, Michigan	1	27	Pinned a sleeping Crash Holly backstage. Aired on May 18, 2000.	
39	Crash Holly	June 12, 2000	Raw is War	St. Louis, Missouri	9	7		
40	Gerald Brisco	June 19, 2000	Raw is War	Nashville, Tennessee	2	0	Pinned Crash Holly during a title defense against Hardcore Holly.	
41	Pat Patterson	June 19, 2000	Raw is War	Nashville, Tennessee	1	6	Pinned Gerald Brisco in the backstage area.	
42	Crash Holly	June 25, 2000	King of the Ring	Boston, Massachusetts	10	2	Pinned Pat Patterson during a title defense against Gerald Brisco in a Hardcore Evening Gown match.	
43	Steve Blackman	June 27, 2000	SmackDown!	Hartford, Connecticut	1	5	Pinned Crash Holly during a title defense against Al Snow. Aired on tape delay on June 29, 2000.	
44	Crash Holly	July 2, 2000	House show	Tampa, Florida	11	0		
45	Steve Blackman	July 2, 2000	House show	Tampa, Florida	2	50		
46	Shane McMahon	August 21, 2000	Raw is War	Lafayette, Louisiana	1	6	Pinned Blackman during a title defense against Test. WWF Commissioner Mick Foley suspended the 24/7 rule from August 24 to August 27 during Shane's reign.	
47	Steve Blackman	August 27, 2000	SummerSlam	Raleigh, North Carolina	3	28		
48	Crash Holly	September 24, 2000	Unforgiven	Philadelphia, Pennsylvania	12	0	Won during 6 man hardcore battle royal.	
49	Perry Saturn	September 24, 2000	Unforgiven	Philadelphia, Pennsylvania	2	0	Won during 6 man Hardcore Battle Royal.	
50	Steve Blackman	September 24, 2000	Unforgiven	Philadelphia, Pennsylvania	4	89	Won during 6 man Hardcore Battle Royal.	
51	Raven	December 22, 2000	Raw is War	Chattanooga, Tennessee	1	31	The title changed hands after a successful defense in a triple threat hardcore match also involving Hardcore Holly. Aired on tape delay on December 25, 2000.	
52	Al Snow	January 22, 2001	Raw is War	Lafayette, Louisiana	4	0		
53	Raven	January 22, 2001	Raw is War	Lafayette, Louisiana	2	12		
54	K-Kwik	February 3, 2001	House show	Greensboro, North Carolina	1	0		
55	Crash Holly	February 3, 2001	House show	Greensboro, North Carolina	13	0		
56	Raven	February 3, 2001	House show	Greensboro, North Carolina	3	1		
57	K-Kwik	February 4, 2001	House show	Columbia, North Carolina	2	0		
58	Crash Holly	February 4, 2001	House show	Columbia, North Carolina	14	0		
59	Raven	February 4, 2001	House show	Columbia, North Carolina	4	2		
60	Hardcore Holly	February 6, 2001	SmackDown!	North Charleston, South Carolina	4	0	Aired on tape delay on February 8, 2001.	
61	Raven	February 6, 2001	SmackDown!	North Charleston, South Carolina	5	4	Aired on tape delay on February 8, 2001.	
62	Hardcore Holly	February 10, 2001	House show	Saint Paul, Minnesota	5	0		
63	Raven	February 10, 2001	House show	Saint Paul, Minnesota	6	1		
64	Hardcore Holly	February 11, 2001	House show	Boston, Massachusetts	6	0		
65	Al Snow	February 11, 2001	House show	Boston, Massachusetts	5	0		
66	Raven	February 11, 2001	House show	Boston, Massachusetts	7	6		
67	Steve Blackman	February 17, 2001	House show	Cedar Falls, Iowa	5	0		
68	Raven	February 17, 2001	House show	Cedar Falls, Iowa	8	1		
69	Steve Blackman	February 18, 2001	House show	Cape Girardeau, Missouri	6	0		
70	Raven	February 18, 2001	House show	Cape Girardeau, Missouri	9	7		
71	Billy Gunn	February 25, 2001	No Way Out	Paradise, Nevada	2	0	Pinned Raven during a title defense against The Big Show.	
72	Raven	February 25, 2001	No Way Out	Paradise, Nevada	10	0		
73	Big Show	February 25, 2001	No Way Out	Paradise, Nevada	1	22		
74	Raven	March 19, 2001	Raw is War	Albany, New York	11	13		
75	Kane	April 1, 2001	WrestleMania X-Seven	Houston, Texas	1	16	This was a Triple Threat Hardcore match also involving The Big Show.	
76	Rhyno	April 17, 2001	SmackDown!	Nashville, Tennessee	1	34	Aired on tape delay on April 19, 2001.	
77	Big Show	May 21, 2001	Raw is War	San Jose, California	2	7		
78	Chris Jericho	May 28, 2001	Raw is War	Calgary, Alberta	1	0		
79	Rhyno	May 28, 2001	Raw is War	Calgary, Alberta	2	15		
80	Test	June 12, 2001	SmackDown!	Baltimore, Maryland	2	13	Aired on tape delay on June 14, 2001.	
81	Rhyno	June 25, 2001	Raw is War	New York, New York	3	0		
82	Mike Awesome	June 25, 2001	Raw is War	New York, New York	1	15	Pinned Rhyno in the backstage area.	
83	Jeff Hardy	July 10, 2001	SmackDown!	Birmingham, Alabama	1	12	Aired on tape delay on July 12, 2001.	
84	Rob Van Dam	July 22, 2001	Invasion	Cleveland, Ohio	1	22		
85	Jeff Hardy	August 13, 2001	Raw is War	Chicago, Illinois	2	6	Pinned Rob Van Dam during a title defense against Kurt Angle.	
86	Rob Van Dam	August 19, 2001	SummerSlam	San Jose, California	2	22	This was a ladder match.	
87	Kurt Angle	September 10, 2001	Raw is War	San Antonio, Texas	1	0		
88	Rob Van Dam	September 10, 2001	Raw is War	San Antonio, Texas	3	90		
89	The Undertaker	December 9, 2001	Vengeance	San Diego, California	1	58		
90	Maven	February 5, 2002	SmackDown!	Los Angeles, California	1	21	Aired on tape delay on February 7, 2002.	
91	Goldust	February 26, 2002	SmackDown!	Boston, Massachusetts	1	13	Pinned Maven in the backstage area. Aired on tape delay on February 28, 2002.	
92	Al Snow	March 11, 2002	Raw	Detroit, Michigan	6	1		
93	Maven	March 12, 2002	SmackDown!	Cleveland, Ohio	2	5	Aired on tape delay on March 14, 2002.	
94	Spike Dudley	March 17, 2002	WrestleMania X8	Toronto, Ontario	1	0	Pinned Maven during a title defense against Goldust.	
95	The Hurricane	March 17, 2002	WrestleMania X8	Toronto, Ontario	1	0	Took place backstage.	
96	Mighty Molly	March 17, 2002	WrestleMania X8	Toronto, Ontario	1	0	Took place backstage.	
97	Christian	March 17, 2002	WrestleMania X8	Toronto, Ontario	1	0	Took place backstage.	
World Wrestling Federation: SmackDown
98	Maven	March 17, 2002	WrestleMania X8	Toronto, Ontario	3	9	Took place backstage. Title becomes exclusive to SmackDown! when Maven is drafted to the brand on the March 25, 2002 episode of Raw.	
World Wrestling Federation: Raw
99	Raven	March 26, 2002	SmackDown!	Philadelphia, Pennsylvania	12	6	Raven was a part of the Raw brand, making the title Raw-exclusive after the WWF Brand Extension. Aired on tape delay on March 28, 2002.	
100	Bubba Ray Dudley	April 1, 2002	Raw	Albany, New York	1	6		
101	William Regal	April 7, 2002	House show	Denver, Colorado	1	0		
102	Goldust	April 7, 2002	House show	Denver, Colorado	2	0		
103	Raven	April 7, 2002	House show	Denver, Colorado	13	0		
104	Bubba Ray Dudley	April 7, 2002	House show	Denver, Colorado	2	6		
105	William Regal	April 13, 2002	House show	Odessa, Texas	2	0		
106	Spike Dudley	April 13, 2002	House show	Odessa, Texas	2	0		
107	Goldust	April 13, 2002	House show	Odessa, Texas	3	0		
108	Bubba Ray Dudley	April 13, 2002	House show	Odessa, Texas	3	1		
109	William Regal	April 14, 2002	House show	Abilene, Texas	3	0		
110	Spike Dudley	April 14, 2002	House show	Abilene, Texas	3	0		
111	Goldust	April 14, 2002	House show	Abilene, Texas	4	0		
112	Bubba Ray Dudley	April 14, 2002	House show	Abilene, Texas	4	1		
113	Raven	April 15, 2002	Raw	College Station, Texas	14	0		
114	Tommy Dreamer	April 15, 2002	Raw	College Station, Texas	1	0		
115	Steven Richards	April 15, 2002	Raw	College Station, Texas	1	0		
116	Bubba Ray Dudley	April 15, 2002	Raw	College Station, Texas	5	4		
117	Goldust	April 19, 2002	House show	Uniondale, New York	5	0		
118	Raven	April 19, 2002	House show	Uniondale, New York	15	0		
119	Bubba Ray Dudley	April 19, 2002	House show	Uniondale, New York	6	1		
120	Goldust	April 20, 2002	House show	Des Moines, Iowa	6	0		
121	Raven	April 20, 2002	House show	Des Moines, Iowa	16	0		
122	Bubba Ray Dudley	April 20, 2002	House show	Des Moines, Iowa	7	9		
123	Steven Richards	April 29, 2002	Raw	Buffalo, New York	2	2	Pinned Bubba Ray Dudley during a title defense against Jazz.	
124	Tommy Dreamer	May 1, 2002	House show	Cologne, Germany	2	0		
125	Goldust	May 1, 2002	House show	Cologne, Germany	7	0		
126	Steven Richards	May 1, 2002	House show	Cologne, Germany	3	1		
127	Shawn Stasiak	May 2, 2002	House show	Glasgow, Scotland	1	0		
128	Justin Credible	May 2, 2002	House show	Glasgow, Scotland	1	0		
129	Crash Holly	May 2, 2002	House show	Glasgow, Scotland	15	0		
130	Steven Richards	May 2, 2002	House show	Glasgow, Scotland	4	0		
131	Shawn Stasiak	May 2, 2002	House show	Glasgow, Scotland	2	0		
132	Steven Richards	May 2, 2002	House show	Glasgow, Scotland	5	1		
133	Crash Holly	May 3, 2002	House show	Birmingham, England	16	0		
134	Steven Richards	May 3, 2002	House show	Birmingham, England	6	1		
135	Booker T	May 4, 2002	Insurrextion	London, England	1	0		
136	Crash Holly	May 4, 2002	Insurrextion	London, England	17	0		
137	Booker T	May 4, 2002	Insurrextion	London, England	2	0		
138	Steven Richards	May 4, 2002	Insurrextion	London, England	7	2	The title is renamed the WWE Hardcore Championship on May 5, 2002 after the WWF changes its name to World Wrestling Entertainment.	
World Wrestling Entertainment (WWE): Raw
139	Bubba Ray Dudley	May 6, 2002	Raw	Hartford, Connecticut	8	0		
140	Raven	May 6, 2002	Raw	Hartford, Connecticut	17	0		
141	Justin Credible	May 6, 2002	Raw	Hartford, Connecticut	2	0		
142	Crash Holly	May 6, 2002	Raw	Hartford, Connecticut	18	0		
143	Trish Stratus	May 6, 2002	Raw	Hartford, Connecticut	1	0		
144	Steven Richards	May 6, 2002	Raw	Hartford, Connecticut	8	19		
145	Tommy Dreamer	May 25, 2002	House show	Winnipeg, Manitoba	3	0		
146	Raven	May 25, 2002	House show	Winnipeg, Manitoba	18	0		
147	Steven Richards	May 25, 2002	House show	Winnipeg, Manitoba	9	1		
148	Tommy Dreamer	May 26, 2002	House show	Red Deer, Alberta	4	0		
149	Raven	May 26, 2002	House show	Red Deer, Alberta	19	0		
150	Steven Richards	May 26, 2002	House show	Red Deer, Alberta	10	1		
151	Terri	May 27, 2002	Raw	Edmonton, Alberta	1	0	Pinned Richards during an interview.	
152	Steven Richards	May 27, 2002	Raw	Edmonton, Alberta	11	6	Richards immediately pinned Terri to regain the championship.	
153	Tommy Dreamer	June 2, 2002	House show	New Orleans, Louisiana	5	0		
154	Raven	June 2, 2002	House show	New Orleans, Louisiana	20	0		
155	Steven Richards	June 2, 2002	House show	New Orleans, Louisiana	12	1		
156	Bradshaw	June 3, 2002	Raw	Dallas, Texas	1	19		
157	Raven	June 22, 2002	House show	Cincinnati, Ohio	21	0		
158	Spike Dudley	June 22, 2002	House show	Cincinnati, Ohio	4	0		
159	Shawn Stasiak	June 22, 2002	House show	Cincinnati, Ohio	3	0		
160	Bradshaw	June 22, 2002	House show	Cincinnati, Ohio	2	6		
161	Shawn Stasiak	June 28, 2002	House show	Washington, D.C.	4	0		
162	Spike Dudley	June 28, 2002	House show	Washington, D.C.	5	0		
163	Steven Richards	June 28, 2002	House show	Washington, D.C.	13	0		
164	Bradshaw	June 28, 2002	House show	Washington, D.C.	3	1		
165	Shawn Stasiak	June 29, 2002	House show	New York, New York	5	0		
166	Spike Dudley	June 29, 2002	House show	New York, New York	6	0		
167	Steven Richards	June 29, 2002	House show	New York, New York	14	0		
168	Bradshaw	June 29, 2002	House show	New York, New York	4	1		
169	Raven	June 30, 2002	House show	Uncasville, Connecticut	22	0		
170	Crash Holly	June 30, 2002	House show	Uncasville, Connecticut	19	0		
171	Steven Richards	June 30, 2002	House show	Uncasville, Connecticut	15	0		
172	Bradshaw	June 30, 2002	House show	Uncasville, Connecticut	5	6		
173	Steven Richards	July 6, 2002	House show	Frederick, Maryland	16	0		
174	Crash Holly	July 6, 2002	House show	Frederick, Maryland	20	0		
175	Christopher Nowinski	July 6, 2002	House show	Frederick, Maryland	1	0		
176	Bradshaw	July 6, 2002	House show	Frederick, Maryland	6	1		
177	Steven Richards	July 7, 2002	House show	Wildwood, New Jersey	17	0		
178	Crash Holly	July 7, 2002	House show	Wildwood, New Jersey	21	0		
179	Christopher Nowinski	July 7, 2002	House show	Wildwood, New Jersey	2	0		
180	Bradshaw	July 7, 2002	House show	Wildwood, New Jersey	7	5		
181	Justin Credible	July 12, 2002	House show	Lakeland, Florida	3	0		
182	Spike Dudley	July 12, 2002	House show	Lakeland, Florida	7	0		
183	Big Show	July 12, 2002	House show	Lakeland, Florida	3	0		
184	Bradshaw	July 12, 2002	House show	Lakeland, Florida	8	1		
185	Justin Credible	July 13, 2002	House show	Daytona Beach, Florida	4	0		
186	Shawn Stasiak	July 13, 2002	House show	Daytona Beach, Florida	6	0		
187	Bradshaw	July 13, 2002	House show	Daytona Beach, Florida	9	1		
188	Justin Credible	July 14, 2002	House show	Bethlehem, Pennsylvania	5	0		
189	Shawn Stasiak	July 14, 2002	House show	Bethlehem, Pennsylvania	7	0		
190	Bradshaw	July 14, 2002	House show	Bethlehem, Pennsylvania	10	1		
191	Johnny Stamboli	July 15, 2002	Raw	East Rutherford, New Jersey	1	0	Pinned Bradshaw during a title defense against Christopher Nowinski.	
192	Bradshaw	July 15, 2002	Raw	East Rutherford, New Jersey	11	11	Pinned Johnny Stamboli in the backstage area, renaming the belt the WWE Texas Hardcore Championship for the duration of his reign.	
193	Raven	July 26, 2002	House show	Houston, Texas	23	0		
194	Justin Credible	July 26, 2002	House show	Houston, Texas	6	0		
195	Shawn Stasiak	July 26, 2002	House show	Houston, Texas	8	0		
196	Bradshaw	July 26, 2002	House show	Houston, Texas	12	1		
197	Raven	July 27, 2002	House show	San Antonio, Texas	24	0		
198	Justin Credible	July 27, 2002	House show	San Antonio, Texas	7	0		
199	Shawn Stasiak	July 27, 2002	House show	San Antonio, Texas	9	0		
200	Bradshaw	July 27, 2002	House show	San Antonio, Texas	13	1		
201	Raven	July 28, 2002	House show	Columbia, South Carolina	25	0		
202	Justin Credible	July 28, 2002	House show	Columbia, South Carolina	8	0		
203	Shawn Stasiak	July 28, 2002	House show	Columbia, South Carolina	10	0		
204	Bradshaw	July 28, 2002	House show	Columbia, South Carolina	14	1		
205	Jeff Hardy	July 29, 2002	Raw	Greensboro, North Carolina	3	0		
206	Johnny Stamboli	July 29, 2002	Raw	Greensboro, North Carolina	2	0		
207	Tommy Dreamer	July 29, 2002	Raw	Greensboro, North Carolina	6	5		
208	Bradshaw	August 3, 2002	House show	Miami, Florida	15	0		
209	Tommy Dreamer	August 3, 2002	House show	Miami, Florida	7	1		
210	Bradshaw	August 4, 2002	House show	Pittsburgh, Pennsylvania	16	0		
211	Tommy Dreamer	August 4, 2002	House show	Pittsburgh, Pennsylvania	8	5		
212	Shawn Stasiak	August 9, 2002	House show	Kelowna, British Columbia	11	0		
213	Steven Richards	August 9, 2002	House show	Kelowna, British Columbia	18	0		
214	Tommy Dreamer	August 9, 2002	House show	Kelowna, British Columbia	9	1		
215	Shawn Stasiak	August 10, 2002	House show	Kamloops, British Columbia	12	0		
216	Steven Richards	August 10, 2002	House show	Kamloops, British Columbia	19	0		
217	Tommy Dreamer	August 10, 2002	House show	Kamloops, British Columbia	10	1		
218	Shawn Stasiak	August 11, 2002	House show	Vancouver, British Columbia	13	0		
219	Steven Richards	August 11, 2002	House show	Vancouver, British Columbia	20	0		
220	Tommy Dreamer	August 11, 2002	House show	Vancouver, British Columbia	11	6		
221	Raven	August 17, 2002	House show	Terre Haute, Indiana	26	0		
222	Shawn Stasiak	August 17, 2002	House show	Terre Haute, Indiana	14	0		
223	Tommy Dreamer	August 17, 2002	House show	Terre Haute, Indiana	12	1		
224	Shawn Stasiak	August 18, 2002	House show	Evansville, Indiana	15	0		
225	Steven Richards	August 18, 2002	House show	Evansville, Indiana	21	0		
226	Tommy Dreamer	August 18, 2002	House show	Evansville, Indiana	13	1		
227	Bradshaw	August 19, 2002	Raw	Norfolk, Virginia	17	0	Won during hardcore battle royal.	
228	Crash Holly	August 19, 2002	Raw	Norfolk, Virginia	22	0	Won during hardcore battle royal.	
229	Tommy Dreamer	August 19, 2002	Raw	Norfolk, Virginia	14	7	Won during hardcore battle royal.The 24/7 rule was deactivated on August 19, 2002.	
230	Rob Van Dam	August 26, 2002	Raw	New York, New York	4	0		
—	Unified	August 26, 2002	Raw	New York, New York	—	—	Upon Van Dam's victory, the title was unified with the WWE Intercontinental Championship.	

== Combined reigns ==
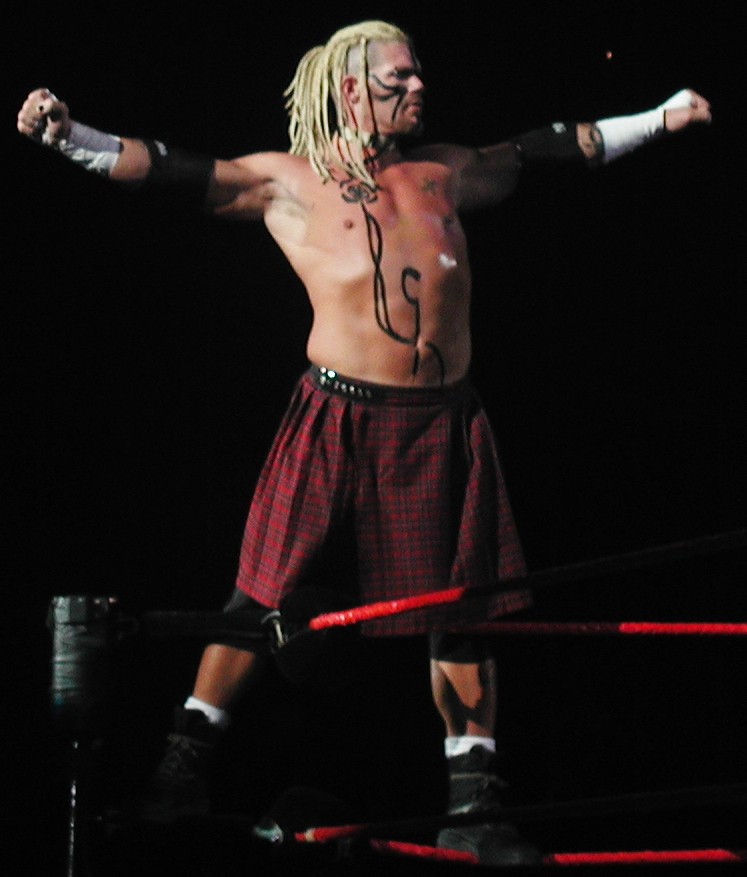
Raven, a record 26 time Hardcore Champion

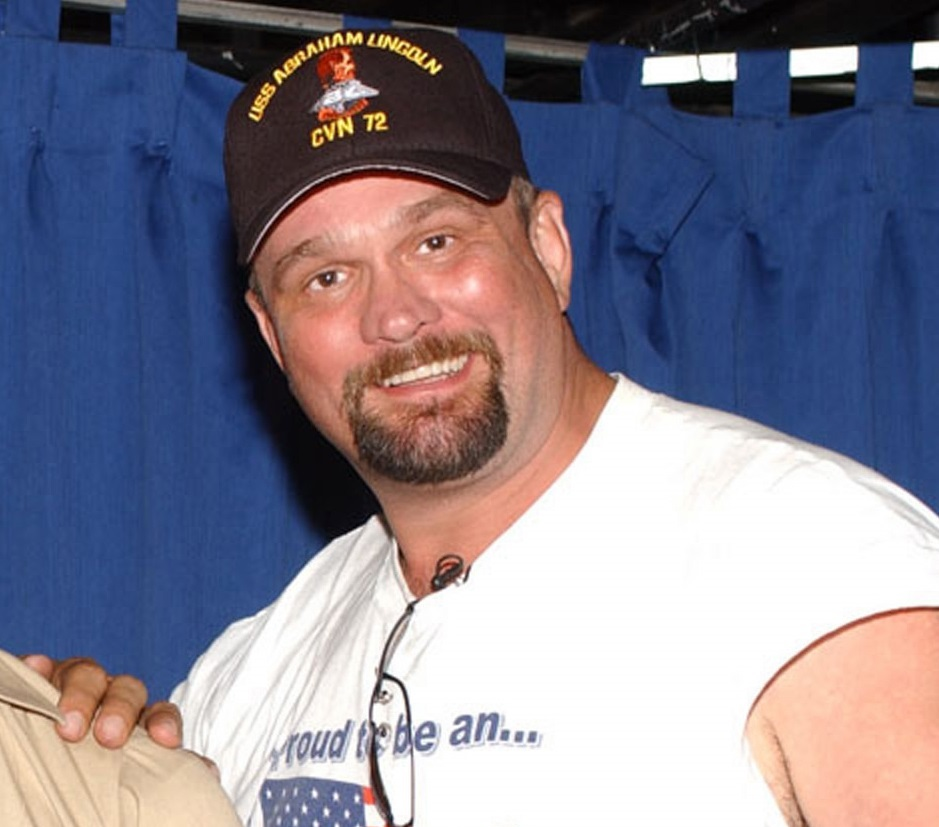
Record longest reigning champion at 97 days Big Boss Man

<1	Indicates that the reign lasted less than one day.
¤	The exact length of one title reign is uncertain, so the shortest possible length is used.

Rank	Wrestler	No. of reigns	Combined days
1	Steve Blackman	6	172
2	Big Boss Man	4	154
3	Rob Van Dam	4	134
4	Al Snow	6	129
5	Crash Holly	22	88
6	Raven	26	84
7	Road Dogg	1	61
8	Hardcore Holly	6	58
8	The Undertaker	1	58
10	Bradshaw	17	56
11	Test	2	49
11	Rhyno	3	49
13	Maven	3	35
13	Steven Richards	21	35
15	Big Show	3	29
16	Mankind	1	28
16	Bubba Ray Dudley	8	28
16	Tommy Dreamer	14	28
19	Gerald Brisco	2	27
20	Jeff Hardy	3	18
21	Kane	1	16
22	Mike Awesome	1	15
23	Billy Gunn	2	13
23	Goldust	7	13
25	Pat Patterson	1	6
25	Shane McMahon	1	6
27	The British Bulldog	2	3
28	Matt Hardy	1	1
29	Chris Jericho	1	<1
29	Christian	1	<1
29	Funaki	1	<1
29	Godfather's Ho	1	<1
29	The Hurricane	1	<1
29	Joey Abs	1	<1
29	Kurt Angle	1	<1
29	Mighty Molly	1	<1
29	Rodney	1	<1
29	Terri	1	<1
29	Thrasher	1	<1
29	Trish Stratus	1	<1
29	Viscera	1	<1
29	Booker T	2	<1
29	Christopher Nowinski	2	<1
29	Johnny Stamboli	2	<1
29	K-Kwik	2	<1
29	Perry Saturn	2	<1
29	Pete Gas	2	<1
29	Tazz	3	<1
29	William Regal	3	<1
29	Spike Dudley	7	<1
29	Justin Credible	8	<1
29	Shawn Stasiak	15	<1

== See also ==
- WCW Hardcore Championship: a hardcore championship that was contested for in World Championship Wrestling (WCW)
- List of former championships in WWE
