= Dupps =

Professional wrestling tag team

Tag team
- Members: Bo Dupp; Jack Dupp; Puck Dupp; Stan Dupp; Fluff Dupp (valet)
- Billed heights: Bo: 6 ft 5 in (1.96 m); Stan: 6 ft 4 in (1.93 m); Puck: 5 ft 11 in (1.80 m); Jack: 6 ft 6 in (1.98 m)
- Combined billed weight: 517 lb (235 kg; 36.9 st)
- Billed from: Lizard Lick, North Carolina
- Debut: 1999
- Disbanded: 2003

The Dupps were a professional wrestling tag team in southern independents and ECW during the late 1990s and early 2000s composed of four wrestlers and one valet. Each of their names is a play on different phrases: "Bowed up", "Jacked up", "Pucked up", "Stand up", and "Fluffed up". They feuded with Danny Doring and Roadkill over who should have a shot at the ECW World Tag Team Championship. The rivalry culminated when The Dupps signed a World Wrestling Federation developmental deal, resulting in a loser leaves town match on the February 25, 2000 episode of ECW on TNN, that the Dupps lost.

After a long stint in the WWF/E developmental system and primarily wrestling infrequently on WWF Jakked, both Dupps were eventually let go in 2001. During their time in the WWF they feuded with the Mean Street Posse.

During the early days of NWA Total Nonstop Action, the team consisted of Bo Dupp and Stan Dupp, and managed by Fluff Dupp. Bo, Stan and Fluff were stereotypical southerners, frequently chewing tobacco and teasing an incestuous relationship. The Dupps became the first Champions of the "Dupp Cup" but lost it to the "Hardcore Midget" Teo.

Stan Dupp went on to use a similar gimmick in World Wrestling Entertainment as "Trevor Murdoch", before being released in July 2008. He returned to TNA in 2009 under the same gimmick as well, though with the name "Jethro Holliday" this time.

== Championships and accomplishments ==
- Carolina Wrestling Federation
  - CWF Mid-Atlantic Tag Team Championship (1 time)
- Memphis Championship Wrestling
  - MCW Southern Tag Team Championship (2 times) - Bo and Jack
- NWA Total Nonstop Action
  - Dupp Cup
- OMEGA
- OMEGA Tag Team Championship (1 time)
- Southern Championship Wrestling
  - SCW Tag Team Championship (1 time)
