= 3-Minute Warning =

Professional wrestling tag team

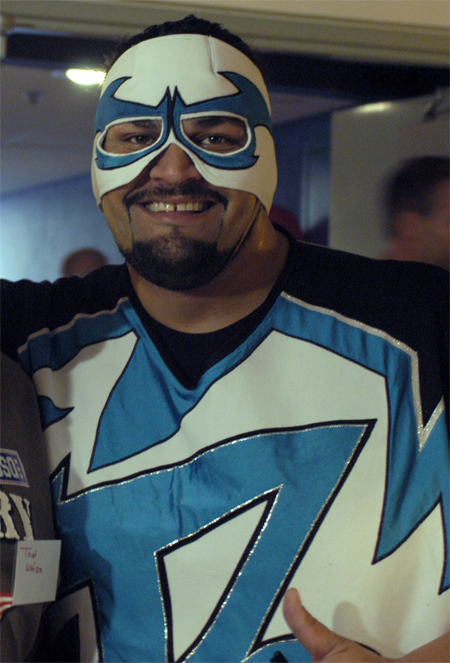
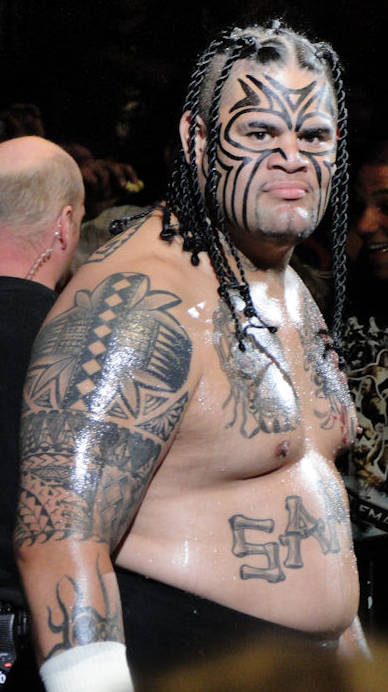
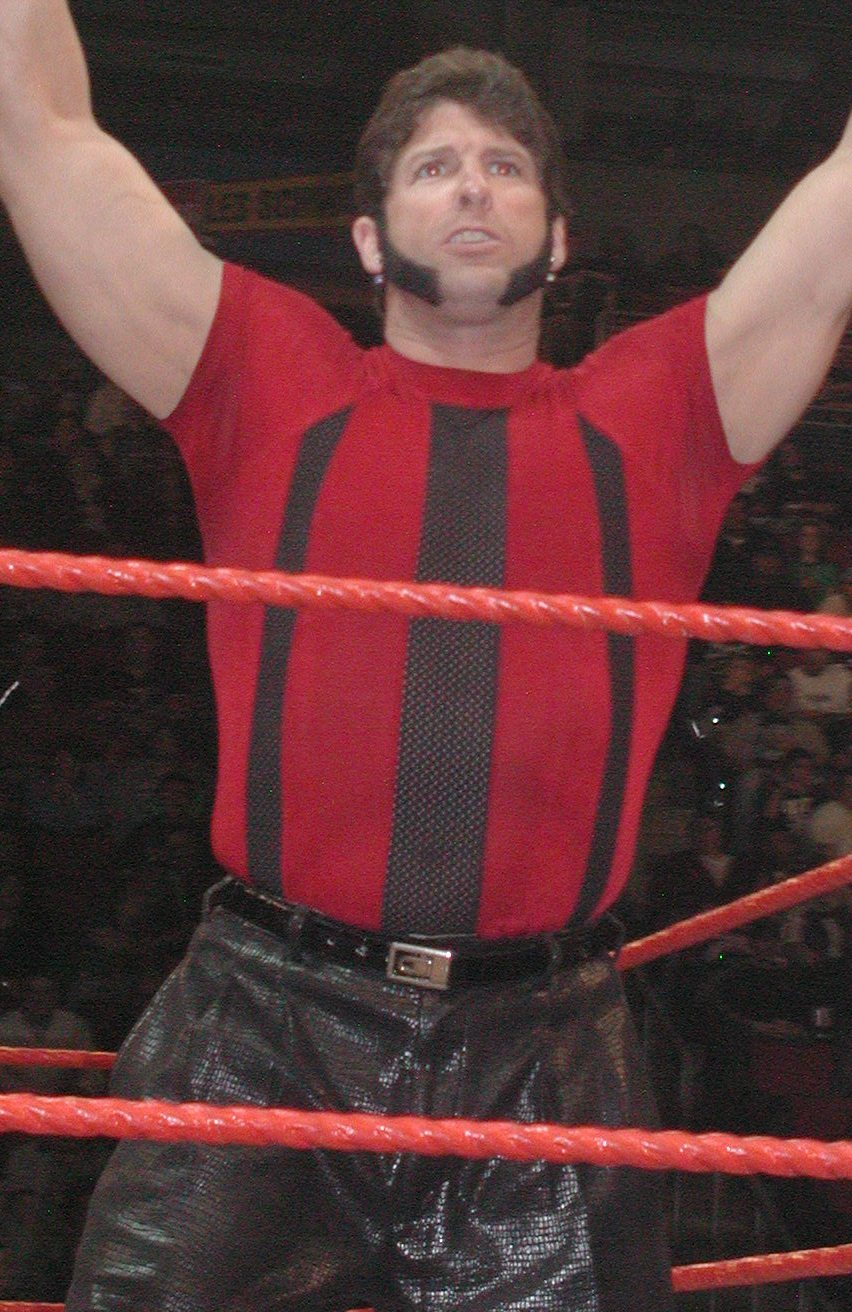
- Rosey (left), Jamal (middle), and Rico (right)

Tag team
- Name(s): Armageddon; 3-Minute Warning; Three Minute Warning; The Island Boyz; The Samoan Gangstas
- Members: Rosey / Kimo; Jamal / Ekmo
- Manager: Rico
- Billed heights: Jamal: 6 ft 4 in (1.93 m); Rosey: 6 ft 7 in (2.01 m)
- Combined billed weight: 939 lb (426 kg; 67.1 st)
- Billed from: Jamal: Houston, Texas; Rosey: Pensacola, Florida; Rico: Las Vegas, Nevada
- Debut: 1996
- Disbanded: June 2003
- Years active: 1996–2003; 2006

3-Minute Warning was an American professional wrestling tag team consisting of cousins Matt Anoaʻi and Eddie Fatu, most notable for their time with WWF/E under their ring names of Rosey and Jamal, respectively. As they were the members of the prominent Anoaʻi family, Rosey was the older brother of current WWE wrestler Roman Reigns and Jamal was the father of Zilla Fatu as well as the younger brother of Rikishi & Samuel Fatu (Samoan Savage/Tonga Kid/Tama) and the uncle of Jimmy Uso, Jey Uso, and Solo Sikoa via Rikishi & Jacob Fatu via Samuel Fatu

== History ==
Anoaʻi and Fatu trained together at the Wild Samoan professional wrestling school operated by members of their family. When their training was completed they debuted in their uncle Afa's World Xtreme Wrestling (WXW), where Matt held the WXW Tag Team Championship as one half of the Samoan Gangstas with another cousin, Lloyd Anoaʻi.

In 1996, Matt and Eddie were brought into the World Wrestling Federation (WWF)’s Heartland Wrestling Association (HWA) "farm league". There they used the individual names Ekmo Fatu (Eddie) and Kimo (Matt), with the team name Island Boyz. They held the HWA Tag Team Championship once, and for a time Haku served as their manager. They left HWA together, and in 2000 traveled to Japan to wrestle for Frontier Martial-Arts Wrestling, where they held the FMW Hardcore Tag Team Championship. The next year they returned to the United States to wrestle for Memphis Championship Wrestling, where again they held gold, holding the MCW Southern Tag Team Championship on three occasions in one month.

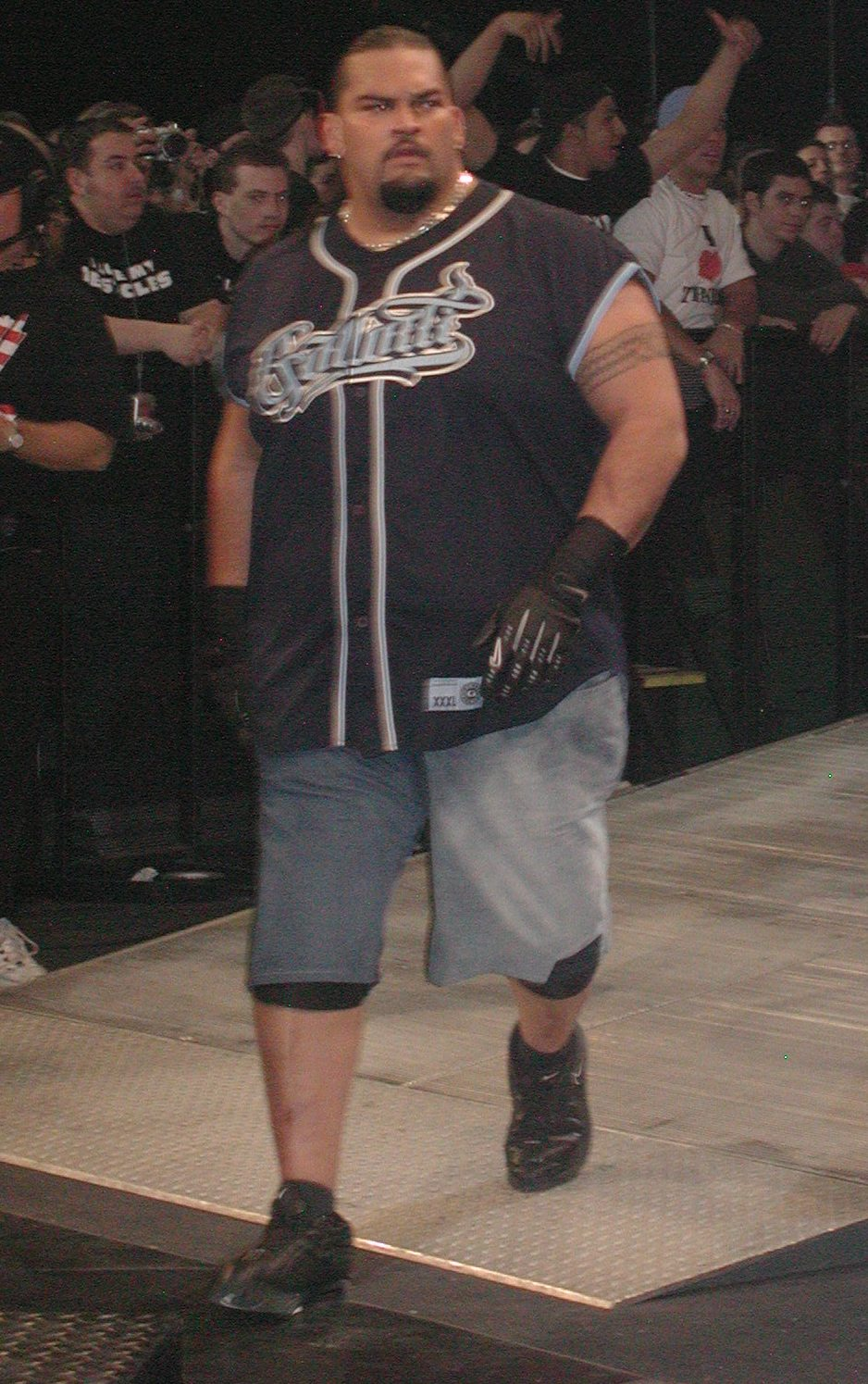
Rosey during his time as part of 3-Minute Warning

In 2002 they returned to (the now renamed) World Wrestling Entertainment as enforcers for Raw General Manager Eric Bischoff. Now known as Jamal (Eddie) and Rosey (Matt), the team was used to squash any activity in the ring that Bischoff deemed "boring". They made their debut on the July 22 episode of Raw, interrupting a match between D'Lo Brown and Shawn Stasiak that had been previously allotted three minutes. When the time limit expired, Rosey and Jamal entered through the crowd and laid out both men, to the delight of Bischoff watching on from the entryway. The gimmick continued over the next few weeks, with Bischoff either giving people three minutes to entertain him before they were attacked, or otherwise deciding that three minutes of a segment was enough before the team appeared to end it. As a result of the time period, the team became known as Three Minute Warning. One of their attacks was on Jeff Hardy, as ordered by Bischoff who thought Jeff was leaving for the SmackDown! brand to reunite with his brother Matt, only for the actual defector to be Jeff's scheduled opponent Crash.

For a time, the team used the 2 Skinnee J's song "3 Minutes" as its entrance music. According to 2 Skinnee J's guitarist, Lance Rockworthy, the band did not receive any compensation for the use of the song.

During the September 12 episode of SmackDown! Three Minute Warning and Eric Bischoff crashed the "commitment ceremony" being held for the Billy and Chuck tag team. Afterward Rico, Billy and Chuck's manager, started managing Three Minute Warning full-time. With Rico by their side they engaged in a feud with the Dudley Boyz (Bubba Ray and Spike) and Jeff Hardy which resulted in their highest-profile match as a team — an Elimination Tables match at the November Survivor Series, which they lost when Bubba Ray, the last man left for his team, received assistance from longtime partner D-Von.

The team stayed on the low- and mid-card for the remainder of 2002 and early 2003, most notably, on an April 28, 2003 episode of Raw when Rico and the Three Minute Warning interfered in a match between Goldberg and Christian, which never began and the three men began to proceed to beat down Goldberg until Jamal and Rosey were speared and Christian hit him with a steel chair. In June 2003, the WWE released Jamal from his contract, following his involvement in a bar fight. Shortly after, Rosey then went to form a superhero tag-team with The Hurricane, winning the World Tag Team Championship in the process, while Jamal did a short stint in Total Nonstop Action Wrestling (TNA) under his "Ekmo Fatu" name before returning to WWE.

They reunited one last time on WWE on a dark match for Sunday Night Heat as they defeated Trent Acid and Bison Bravado on January 9, 2006. Originally, they were going to be repackaged as 3 Minute Warning, instead Rosey was released by the company in March 2006 and Jamal was repackaged as Umaga, and twice won the Intercontinental Championship. Umaga (Jamal) was released by the company in June 2009.

Jamal would pass away in December 2009 at 36 and Rosey passed away in April 2017 at 47.

== Championships and accomplishments ==
- Frontier Martial-Arts Wrestling
  - FMW/WEW Hardcore Tag Team Championship (1 time)
- Heartland Wrestling Association
  - HWA Tag Team Championship (1 time)
- Memphis Championship Wrestling
  - MCW Southern Tag Team Championship (3 times)
- Wrestling Observer Newsletter awards
  - Worst Tag Team (2002)

== See also ==
- Anoaʻi family
- The Bloodline
- Samoan SWAT Team
