= MCW Hardcore Championship =

Professional wrestling championship

Details
- Promotion: Memphis Championship Wrestling
- Date established: February 17, 2001
- Date retired: June 1, 2001
Statistics
- First champion(s): Bitty Little
- Final champion(s): Joey Abs

The Memphis Championship Wrestling (MCW) Hardcore Title first champion was Bitty Little, because Little forced MCW Commissioner Al Kee Holic to award him the championship, even though a tournament had been scheduled to determine the first champion. Joey Abs gave the belt to MCW Commissioner Shooter Schultz after winning it, and Schultz abandoned the title on June 1, 2001. Schultz claimed to hate hardcore wrestling, and he vowed to throw the belt into the Mississippi River.

== Title History ==
Wrestler:	Date:	Location:	Notes:
Bitty Little	February 17, 2001		Awarded.
Seven	April 21, 2001		
Joey Abs	May 11, 2001	Coldwater, MS	Abs gave the belt to MCW Commissioner Shooter Schultz after winning it.
Schultz abandoned the title on June 1, 2001 in Marmaduke, Arkansas.
