= WWE Hardcore Championship =

Men's professional wrestling championship

- The WWF/WWE Hardcore Championship (circa 2002)

Details
- Promotion: WWE
- Date established: November 2, 1998
- Date retired: August 26, 2002

Other names
- WWF Hardcore Championship (1998–2002); WWE Hardcore Championship (2002)
Statistics
- First champion: Mick Foley
- Final champion: Rob Van Dam
- Most reigns: Raven (39 reigns)
- Longest reign: Big Boss Man (97 days)
- Shortest reign: Terri Runnels (8 seconds)
- Oldest champion: Pat Patterson (59 years, 152 days)
- Youngest champion: Christopher Nowinski (23 years, 285 days)
- Heaviest champion: Big Show (500 lb (230 kg))
- Lightest champion: Terri Runnels (100 lb (45 kg))

The WWE Hardcore Championship was a hardcore wrestling championship in the WWF (now WWE) which was contested under "hardcore" rules (no disqualifications, no countouts, and pinfalls count anywhere). In the latter part of the title's history, a rule was implemented allowing anyone to challenge the champion at any place or time, provided a referee was present (dubbed the "24/7 rule"). It is considered one of the most defining titles of the Attitude Era. It was established on November 2, 1998, with Mankind as the inaugural champion. On August 26, 2002, it was unified with the WWE Intercontinental Championship by Rob Van Dam, the final Hardcore Champion.

== History ==
=== Ratification ===
During a storyline where The Corporation was manipulating Mankind, Vince McMahon awarded the taped-up, broken championship belt to Mankind as a backhanded compliment to keep him away from WWF Championship contention. Rather than reject the dilapidated title belt, Mankind embraced it with gratitude, calling McMahon "dad," to the disgust of The Corporation. The title was won by the Big Boss Man a month later, and was then defended as a regular title.

=== 24/7 rule ===
When Crash Holly won the belt, he introduced the "24/7 rule" that the belt was to be defended at all times as long as a referee was present. This allowed for many comic relief moments, such as the belt changing hands while the champion was asleep (Crash Holly lost the title while he was sleeping to Gerald Brisco), and The Headbangers chasing Crash Holly around an amusement park in Brooklyn (Holly eventually escaped from a ball pit and ran from the building, still the champion).

At WrestleMania X8, Maven defended the title against Goldust. After they knocked each other out with trash can lids, Spike Dudley entered and pinned Maven to win the title. Then, in the backstage area, The Hurricane pinned Spike for the title. Mighty Molly (The Hurricane's sidekick) told The Hurricane to go to the "Hurri-cycle" before knocking him out with a frying pan when his back was turned and pinning him. While looking for a safe place, Christian won the title by pinning Molly after hitting her in the head with a door. As he was about to leave the building in a taxi, he was attacked and pinned by Maven, who regained the title and escaped in the taxi.

Trish Stratus faced Jazz (managed by then-Hardcore Champion Stevie Richards) for the Women's Championship, and lost due to Richards' interference. After the match, Bubba Ray Dudley attacked Richards from behind and pinned him for the title. Raven appeared and pinned Dudley, but quickly lost the title to Justin Credible, who was then pinned by Crash Holly. Dudley hit Holly with a trash can, but Stratus stole the pin on him. Dudley tried to attack Stratus from behind, but Jazz sprayed him with a fire extinguisher. Richards then stole the final pin of the night after Dudley accidentally powerbombed Stratus through a wooden table.

This rule has allowed the shortest title reigns and quickest title changes in WWE history. Four women have held the Hardcore Championship: Molly Holly (as Mighty Molly), Trish Stratus, Terri Runnels, and The Godfather's ho. The championship often changed hands at house shows, to give the audience a "big moment". In the end, the title always returned to its original holder. At WrestleMania 2000, a battle royal match, in the style of Championship Scramble was booked where the title changed hands 10 times during the 15 minutes. The eventual winner was Hardcore Holly, Tazz, Viscera, Funaki, Rodney, Joey Abs, Thrasher, Pete Gas, and Crash Holly all held the title for varying times throughout the match, usually for very short periods of time. The longest reign in the match was Viscera holding the title for nearly seven minutes.

Between the Invasion storyline and WrestleMania X8, the "24/7" rule was only used twice, during matches on the Raw Is War episodes of August 13, 2001 and September 10, 2001 respectively. Both matches were coincidentally between Kurt Angle and Rob Van Dam. On the August 13 episode of Raw Is War, Jeff Hardy interfered and brought a referee with him, and pinned Van Dam for the title, setting up a match for them at that year's SummerSlam. On the September 10 episode of Raw Is War, however, Angle won the match, then was thrown off the entrance ramp by Stone Cold Steve Austin, who then also threw Van Dam off the ramp too. Van Dam landed on Angle and a referee counted the pin.

After the Invasion storyline, The Undertaker won the title from Van Dam. He defended against numerous opponents (usually smaller than him) and assaulted them after the matches (with the exception of Big Show). Although the 24/7 rule was still in effect during his reign, The Undertaker was not challenged by others under the rule; in storyline, commentator Jim Ross attributed this fact to no wrestler being "stupid enough" to do so. The 24/7 rule ended on August 19, 2002 when Raw general manager Eric Bischoff suspended it before a six-minute hardcore battle royal, won by Tommy Dreamer. Previously, a 24-hour suspension on the rule was in place for Rob Van Dam and Jeff Hardy's match at WWF Invasion. Commissioner Mick Foley also suspended the rule while Shane McMahon held the title, to ensure he was still the champion at SummerSlam, to defend against Steve Blackman, whom he cheated out of the belt. On May 20, 2019, WWE unveiled a new championship, the WWE 24/7 Championship, which was contested under the same 24/7 rule.

=== Unification and retirement ===
The title was unified with the Intercontinental Championship on August 26, 2002, when Intercontinental Champion Rob Van Dam defeated Hardcore Champion Tommy Dreamer. This was one month after Van Dam defeated Jeff Hardy in a ladder match to unify the Intercontinental and European Championships.

=== Sporadic appearances ===
On the June 23, 2003 episode of Raw, Mick Foley (who was the first champion, as "Mankind") was awarded the Hardcore Championship belt (but not the championship) by the Raw authority figure Stone Cold Steve Austin for his contributions to hardcore wrestling. On May 22, 2006, Edge and Foley declared themselves co-holders of the championship as part of a storyline involving alumni of the hardcore wrestling-based Extreme Championship Wrestling (ECW) promotion and were brought to ECW One Night Stand when they and Lita fought Tommy Dreamer, Terry Funk, and Beulah McGillicutty in an intergender tag team Extreme Rules match. The title was not defended and soon quietly disappeared. In November 2024, Triple H appeared at a Travis Scott concert and handed him a new Hardcore Championship belt, this one based on the modern WWE Championship belt, while declaring him the new WWE Hardcore Champion.

=== Origin of the belt ===
The Hardcore Championship belt was rumored to have been a replica of the "Winged Eagle" WWF Championship belt, which was smashed in several places and reassembled with two pieces of duct tape, and inscribed with the words "Hardcore" and "Champion" in marker. During a feud between "Mr. Perfect" Curt Hennig and then-champion Hulk Hogan, Hennig stole the championship belt and smashed the center medallion with a hammer during an interview. As Hennig had done so much genuine damage, a replica belt had to be used for the remainder of the story line. The center medallion on the replica and the Hardcore championship is identical. Mick Foley commented that he did not know if the belt that Hennig smashed was later used as the Hardcore Championship, but quipped that "it makes ‘perfect’ sense." WWE listed this theory as one of its urban legends, but was unable to determine whether it is true. The original belt was later sold as memorabilia by former WWE employee Mel Phillips and authenticated by belt makers Dave Millican and Reggie Parks, thus debunking the longtime rumor.

When Bradshaw won the title in June 2002, he briefly renamed it the Texas Hardcore Championship, and wore a Smoking Skull belt customized with the Texas flag, artificial bull horns and a Bullrope on the centerplate. Tommy Dreamer, in the last title defense of the Hardcore Championship, used a variation of the belt with a New York license plate as a centerplate, over a replica of a European Championship. The reason for these changes was because the original belt had become so damaged from wear and tear. Travis Scott's version of the belt is a replica of the original black "Big Network" WWE Championship belt, with the original duct tape and marker 'label' as the original belt, due to the fact the original Hardcore Championship belt being now in the hands of Mick Foley, and WWE's own standardization of belt designs.

== Reigns ==
Mr. McMahon awarded Mankind the WWF Hardcore Championship on November 2, 1998. After Mankind lost the title to Big Boss Man, he never attempted to recapture the title, mainly because of the main event push he received shortly afterward. At the time of conception, the idea was for the belt to be used in comedy segments to play on Mankind's reputation as a hardcore wrestler. However, as Mankind and hardcore wrestling became more popular with audiences, the Hardcore Championship became a more serious title. Its popularity led competitor World Championship Wrestling (WCW) to create its own Hardcore Championship, a move followed by numerous independent promotions.
