= Joey Abs =

American professional wrestler (born 1971)

Personal information
- Born: Jason Arhndt; October 15, 1971 (age 54) Carthage, North Carolina, U.S.

Professional wrestling career
- Ring name(s): Jason Arhndt; Joey Abs; Venom
- Billed height: 6 ft 3 in (191 cm)
- Billed weight: 277 lb (126 kg)
- Billed from: Carthage, North Carolina; Greenwich, Connecticut (WWF)
- Trained by: OMEGA Championship Wrestling; Memphis Championship Wrestling
- Debut: 1994
- Retired: 2001

Jason Arhndt (born October 15, 1971) is an American retired professional wrestler. He is best known for his appearances with the World Wrestling Federation (WWF) under the ring name Joey Abs as part of the Mean Street Posse. He also performed using the ring name Venom.

== Professional wrestling career ==
=== Early career (1994–1999) ===
Arhndt began his career as a member of Matt and Jeff Hardy's Organization of Modern Extreme Grappling Arts (OMEGA) in Cameron, North Carolina. Arhndt also made some appearances as enhancement talent using his real name on WWF Monday Night Raw in 1994 and 1995. On August 2, 1997, he was defeated by Jeff Hardy to crown the first OMEGA New Frontiers Champion. Abs continued jobbing in the WWF in 1997 and 1998 Shotgun Saturday Night.

=== World Wrestling Federation (1999–2001) ===
In early 1999, he joined the WWF as Joey Abs. He made his WWF debut on the June 21, 1999 episode of Raw is War. He was a part of the Mean Street Posse, a heel stable, with Pete Gas and Rodney, clad in sweater vests, loafers, and dress pants. Although Gas and Rodney were actual childhood friends of Shane McMahon, Abs was not and had a legitimate wrestling background. They started off as a group from Greenwich, Connecticut of about ten people in early 1999, but then as the year went on the stable whittled its way down to three members. The group was closely allied with McMahon, often helping him defend the WWE European Championship throughout early 1999. Abs got involved with McMahon's feud with Test, as McMahon tried to get his sister Stephanie to date Abs instead of Test. Test would attack the Posse in backstage segments. At WrestleMania 2000, each member won the WWF Hardcore Championship for a short while. He was taken off TV in May 2000.

All three Posse members were briefly signed to the WWF developmental territory of Memphis Championship Wrestling (MCW). In MCW in June 2000, Abs won the MCW Southern Heavyweight Championship from Lord Steven Regal. He, however, lost the title to K-Krush on August 19. Abs continued working in the WWF in dark matches and house shows for the rest of the year and going into January 2001. He won the MCW Southern Heavyweight Championship for the second time defeating Steve Bradley on June 16, 2001 and dropped the title back to Bradley. Abs was released from the WWF in June 2001 and retired in the same year.

== Championships and accomplishments ==
- Championship Wrestling Federation
  - CWF Heavyweight Championship (1 time)
- Memphis Championship Wrestling
  - MCW Hardcore Championship (1 time)
  - MCW Southern Heavyweight Championship (2 times)
- National Championship Wrestling
  - NCW Heavyweight Championship (2 times)
- New Frontier Wrestling Association
  - NFWA Tag Team Championship (1 time) - with Matt Hardy
- Organization of Modern Extreme Grappling Arts
  - OMEGA Heavyweight Championship (1 time)
- Pro Wrestling Illustrated
  - PWI ranked him # 176 of the Top 500 singles wrestlers in the PWI 500 in 2000
- World Wrestling Federation
  - WWF Hardcore Championship (1 time)
