= OMEGA Heavyweight Championship =

Professional wrestling championship

Details
- Promotion: Organization of Modern Extreme Grappling Arts
- Date established: August 2, 1997
- Current champion: Matt Hardy
- Date won: November 21, 2015
Statistics
- First champion: Sweet Dreamz
- Most reigns: Matt Hardy (2 reigns)
- Longest reign: Matt Hardy (3629+ days)
- Shortest reign: Steve Corino (<1 day)
- Oldest champion: Matt Hardy (41 years, 59 days)
- Youngest champion: Trevor Lee (21 years, 214 days)
- Heaviest champion: Venom (268lbs (122kg))
- Lightest champion: Cham-Pain (188lbs (85kg))

The OMEGA Heavyweight Championship is the top singles title in the Organization of Modern Extreme Grappling Arts (OMEGA) independent professional wrestling promotion. The title's original run lasted from 1997 to 2000, before being recommissioned at OMEGA's Night of a Champion on February 28, 2015, crowning Jeff Hardy as the first champion since 2000.

== Title history ==
No.	Order in reign history
Reign	The reign number for the specific set of wrestlers listed
Event	The event in which the title was won
—	Used for vacated reigns so as not to count it as an official reign
N/A	The information is not available or is unknown
+	Indicates the current reign is changing daily

#	Wrestler	Reign	Date	Days held	Location	Event	Notes
1	Sweet Dreamz	1	August 2, 1997	125	Southern Pines, NC	N/A	Defeated Surge in a tournament final to become the first champion.
—	Vacated	—	December 5, 1997	—	N/A	N/A	
2	Surge	1	December 5, 1997	365	Southern Pines, NC	OMEGA Christmas Combat	Defeated Rick Michaels for the vacated title.
—	Vacated	—	December 5, 1998	—	N/A	N/A	
3	Venom	1	December 5, 1998	208 – 238	Durham, NC	N/A	Defeated Cham-Pain for the vacated title.
4	Cham-Pain	1	July 1999	157 – 127	Beulaville, NC	OMEGA	
—	Vacated	—	December 5, 1999	—	N/A	N/A	
5	Steve Corino	1	December 1, 2000	0	Southern Pines, NC	OMEGA Reunion Show	
—	Deactivated	—	December 1, 2000	—	N/A	N/A	Title deactivated due to OMEGA Championship Wrestling closing.
6	Jeff Hardy	1	February 28, 2015	63	Durham, NC	OMEGA Night Of A Champion	Defeated Matt Hardy, C. W. Anderson, Tommy Dreamer, Trevor Lee and Caprice Coleman to reintroduce the title.
—	Vacated	—	May 2, 2015	—	N/A	N/A	Title vacated due to Hardy suffering a broken leg.
7	Trevor Lee	1	May 2, 2015	203	Cameron, NC	OMEGA Chaos In Cameron II	Defeated C. W. Anderson and Matt Hardy to win the vacant title.
8	Matt Hardy	2	November 21, 2015	3,629	Cameron, NC	OMEGA Loco In Joco 3	

== Combined reigns ==
As of October 28, 2025.

†	Indicates the current champion

Rank	Wrestler	No. of reigns	Combined days
1	Matt Hardy/Surge †	2	3994+
2	Venom	1	208-238
3	Trevor Lee	1	203
4	Cham-Pain	1	127-157
5	Sweet Dreamz	1	125
6	Jeff Hardy	1	63
7	Steve Corino	1	<1

== See also ==
- OMEGA Championship Wrestling
