= Jeff Hardy =

American professional wrestler (born 1977)

- Hardy at GalaxyCon Des Moines in 2026
- Born: Jeffrey Nero Hardy; August 31, 1977 (age 49); Cameron, North Carolina, U.S.
- Spouse: Beth Britt (m. 2011)
- Children: 2
- Relatives: Matt Hardy (brother); Reby Sky (sister-in-law)
- Professional wrestling career
- Ring name(s): Brother Nero; Itchweed; Jeff Harvey; Jeff Hardy; Keith Davis; Wildo Jynx; Willow; Wolverine
- Billed height: 6 ft 1 in (185 cm)
- Billed weight: 225 lb (102 kg)
- Billed from: Cameron, North Carolina; Raleigh, North Carolina; The Hardy Compound in Cameron, North Carolina
- Trained by: Dory Funk Jr. Michael Hayes
- Debut: May 23, 1994
- Musical career
- Genres: Alternative rock, alternative metal, indie, acoustic
- Instruments: Vocals, guitar, piano
- Years active: 1993–present
- Label: TNA Knockout Music
- Member of: PeroxWhy?Gen

Signature
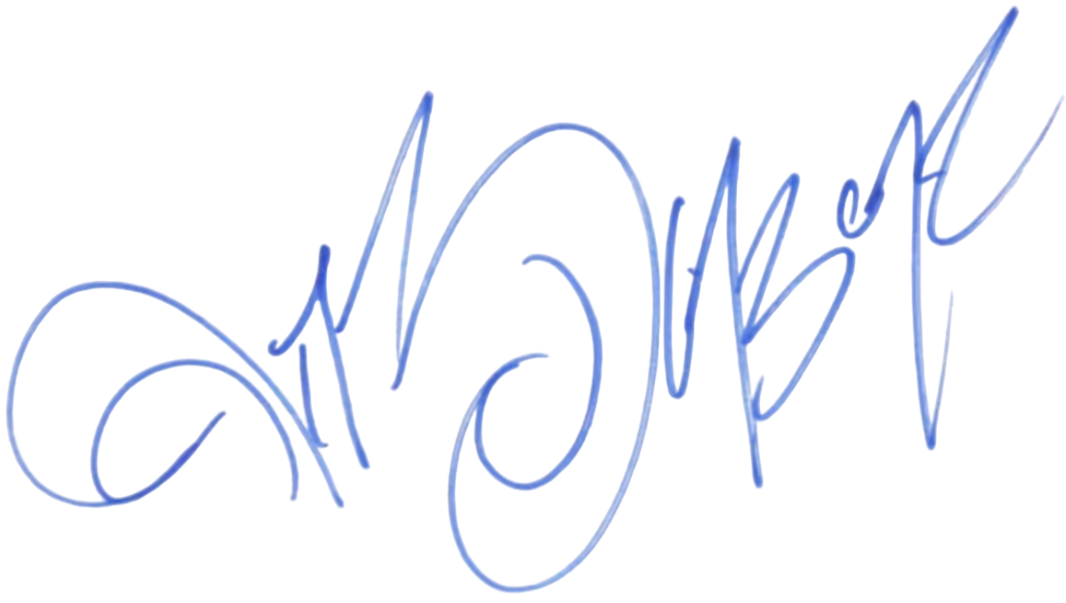

Jeffrey Nero Hardy (born August 31, 1977) is an American professional wrestler. He is signed to Total Nonstop Action Wrestling (TNA), where he is a former five-time TNA World Tag Team Champion with brother Matt. He is also known for his tenures with WWE and All Elite Wrestling (AEW).

Together with his brother Matt Hardy, the tag team The Hardy Boyz are regarded as one of the major teams that revived tag team wrestling during the Attitude Era.

Born and raised in Cameron, North Carolina, Hardy started his career as a youth performing in the Trampoline Wrestling Federation, which he started alongside his brother Matt Hardy. Eventually, that would transition into the Organization of Modern Extreme Grappling Arts (OMEGA) as they became older. As a tag team, the Hardy Boyz worked as enhancement talents for the World Wrestling Federation (WWF) from 1994, and were signed to full-time contracts in 1998. They gained notoriety in the tag team division, partly due to their participation in Tables, Ladders and Chairs matches. With the addition of Lita, the team became known as Team Xtreme and continued to rise in popularity. After splitting up as a team in 2002, Jeff's popularity as a singles wrestler began to grow. However, the brothers still teamed up sporadically in the years afterward, and together they have held twenty-one world tag team championships between WWE, TNA, ROH and other promotions.

Hardy had great success in his singles career, capturing his first of six world championships, the WWE Championship, in 2008, and going on to hold WWE's World Heavyweight Championship twice and the TNA World Heavyweight Championship three times. Within WWF/WWE, he has also won the Intercontinental Championship five times, the Hardcore Championship three times and the European, Light Heavyweight, and United States Championships once each. Having won the required championships, he is the 18th Triple Crown Champion and 9th Grand Slam Champion in WWE history (one of five men to complete both WWE Grand Slam formats, and one of two to win all original Grand Slam titles). He has headlined numerous pay-per-view events for WWE and TNA, including TNA's flagship event, Bound for Glory, on two occasions. Readers of Pro Wrestling Illustrated named him "Most Popular Wrestler of the Year" on two occasions.

Outside of professional wrestling, Hardy is involved in motocross, as well as artistic endeavors, particularly music and painting. He is currently a member of the band PeroxWhy?Gen, with whom he tours and has released three studio albums and four extended plays. In 2003, Hardy, along with his brother Matt, co-wrote an autobiographical book of memoirs titled The Hardy Boyz. Their book was a New York Times Best Seller.

== Early life ==
Jeffrey Nero Hardy is the son of Gilbert and Ruby Moore Hardy, and the younger brother of Matt Hardy. Their mother died of brain cancer in 1987, when Jeff Hardy was ten. He developed an interest in motocross at age 12 and got his first bike, a Yamaha YZ-80. He had his first race when he was in the ninth grade. Hardy played baseball when he was young, but had to stop after he crashed during a motocross race, injuring his arm. He also played football during high school as a fullback and linebacker. He briefly competed in amateur wrestling in high school. He had to stop playing football in high school, after he was ordered to pick between professional wrestling and football, and he chose wrestling. Hardy's favorite subjects in school were U.S. history and art, which he did for extra credit.

== Professional wrestling career ==
=== Early career (1993–1998) ===
Hardy, along with his brother Matt and friends, started their own federation, the Trampoline Wrestling Federation (TWF) and mimicked the moves they saw on television. Later on, the TWF went under several names, eventually being integrated into a county fair in North Carolina. The brothers and their friends then began to work for other independent companies. They drove all over the East Coast of the United States, working for companies such as ACW and other small promotions.

Before arriving in the WWF, Jeff and Matt formed their own wrestling promotion, the Organization of Modern Extreme Grappling Arts (OMEGA) with Thomas Simpson. The promotion was a more successful version of the original TWF and included talent such as both Hardy brothers, Shannon Moore, Gregory Helms, Joey Matthews, and Steve Corino, among others. In OMEGA, each of the brothers portrayed several characters; Hardy portrayed such characters as Willow the Wisp, Iceman, Mean Jimmy Jack Tomkins, and The Masked Mountain. While there, Hardy held the New Frontier Championship (NFC) as a singles competitor and the Tag Team Championship with Matt. The promotion folded in April 1998 when they signed contracts with the WWF.

=== World Wrestling Federation/World Wrestling Entertainment (1994–2003) ===
==== Early years (1994–1998) ====
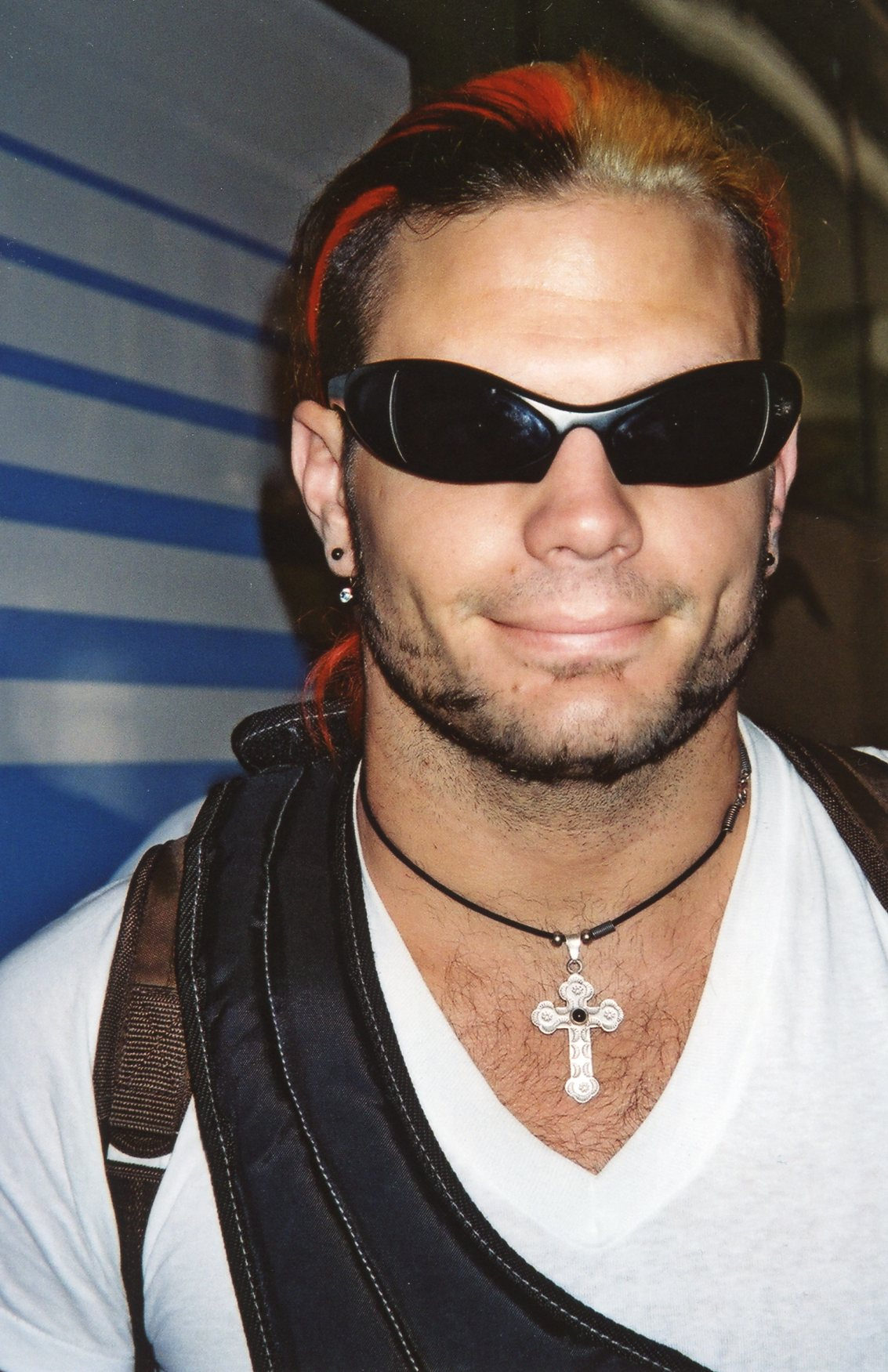
Hardy in 1999

Hardy cites Hulk Hogan, Ultimate Warrior, Sting, and Shawn Michaels as his childhood inspirations to wrestle. He started on World Wrestling Federation (WWF) television as a jobber. His first WWF match was against Razor Ramon on May 23, 1994, in Youngstown, Ohio, with Randy Savage mentioning on commentary, "Welcome to the big time". His ringname that night, Keith Davis, was the name of Razor's scheduled jobber, who backed out on short notice. Gary Sabaugh, who had brought Hardy in a group along with Davis, suggested him to agent Tony Garea, who agreed after Hardy claimed he was 18 (he was in fact, only 16). The next day, he wrestled under his real name against The 1–2–3 Kid, and the match aired on the June 25, 1994, episode of Superstars. Later on faced against King Kong Bundy and Jim Neidhart, Owen Hart and Triple H. Hardy defeated Razor Ramon by countout on WWF Superstars January 13, 1996 (taped December 19, 1995) when Goldust's handler distracted Razor and Razor chased after him. In 1996, he would be teamed with his brother, Matt and occasionally wrestled as a jobber as late as May 1998 (including a match against Rob Van Dam during the ECW "invasion" storyline that had Hardy billed as being from Virginia instead of Cameron, North Carolina)

==== The Hardy Boyz (1998–2002) ====
The Hardy brothers eventually caught the eyes of the World Wrestling Federation (WWF). After being signed to a contract in 1998, they were trained by Dory Funk Jr. in his Funkin' Dojo with other notable wrestlers such as Kurt Angle, Christian, Test, and A-Train. When the team was finally brought up to WWF television, after months of "jobbing" and live events, they then formed the acrobatic tag team called the Hardy Boyz. While feuding with The Brood in mid-1999, they added Michael Hayes as their manager. On July 5, they won their first WWF Tag Team Championship by defeating the Acolytes, but lost it back to them a month later. After the dissolution of the Brood, the Hardys joined forces with Gangrel as The New Brood and feuded with Edge and Christian. This stable did not last long, however, and on October 17 at No Mercy, the Hardy Boyz won the managerial services of Terri Runnels in the finals of the Terri Invitational Tournament in the WWF's first ever tag team ladder match against Edge and Christian. They competed in the first ever tag team triple threat ladder match against The Dudley Boyz, and Edge & Christian at WrestleMania 2000 on April 2, 2000, in which Edge & Christian won. During the match, Hardy performed a Swanton Bomb to Bubba Ray Dudley off a 20-foot ladder.

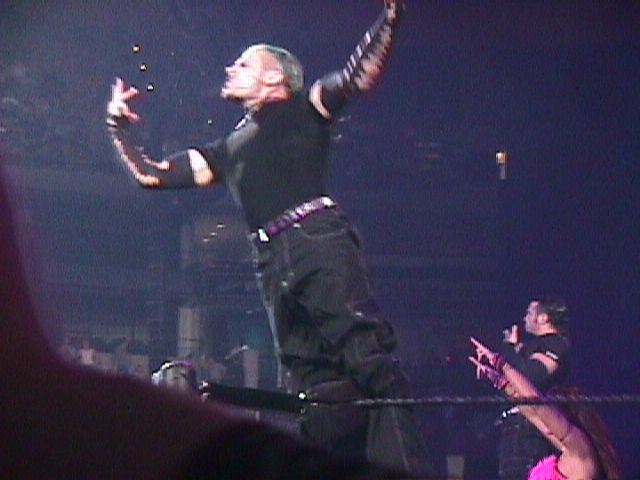
Team Xtreme at King of the Ring in June 2000

In 2000, the Hardy Boyz found a new manager in their real-life friend Lita. Together, the three became known as "Team Xtreme". They continued their feud with Edge and Christian throughout 2000, defeating them for the WWF Tag Team Championship on two occasions. At SummerSlam on August 27, the Hardy Boyz competed in perhaps the most physically demanding type of match they had competed in thus far- the first ever Tables, Ladders, and Chairs match (TLC match)- in their hometown of Raleigh, for the Tag Team Championship against the Dudley Boyz and Edge & Christian, but were unsuccessful. The second TLC match at WrestleMania X-Seven on April 1, 2001, in Houston, which is regarded as one of the greatest matches in WWE history they faced off once again against Edge & Christian and the Dudley Boyz but lost to Edge & Christian.

Jeff gained attention for his high risk stunts in the TLC matches, such as doing the Swanton Bomb off of the top steps of 10 and 20 foot high steel ladders, making a name for himself as one of the most seemingly reckless and unorthodox WWF performers of his time. In 2001, Hardy received a push as a singles competitor, and he held the Intercontinental (defeating Triple H), Light Heavyweight (defeating Jerry Lynn) and Hardcore Championships (defeating Mike Awesome and Van Dam on two occasions). At the end of 2001, the Hardys began a storyline in which they began to fight, which led to Matt demanding a match at Vengeance on December 9, with Lita as the special guest referee. After Jeff beat Matt by pinfall at Vengeance, while Matt's foot was on the ropes, Jeff and Lita began feuding against Matt. In the middle of the feud, however, Jeff faced The Undertaker in a Hardcore Championship match on the December 17 episode of Raw and lost. After the match, The Undertaker attacked both Jeff and Lita, injuring them. On the next episode of SmackDown!, The Undertaker attacked Matt as well, also injuring him, in storyline. The Hardys and Lita were not seen again until the Royal Rumble on January 20, 2002, because WWF did not have another storyline for their characters. The Hardys later came back as a team, and there was never any mention of their previous storyline split.

In early April, the Hardy Boyz began a feud with Brock Lesnar after Lesnar gave Matt an F-5 on the steel entrance ramp, which led to an angered Jeff seeking revenge on Lesnar. At Backlash on April 21, Jeff faced-off against Lesnar in Lesnar's first televised match. Lesnar dominated Jeff and won the match by knockout. Lesnar and the Hardys continued to feud over the next few weeks, with the Hardys coming out victorious only once by disqualification. At Judgment Day on May 19, Lesnar gained the upper hand on the Hardy Boyz before tagging his partner, Paul Heyman, in to claim the win for the team. In July 2002, Jeff won his third Hardcore Championship by defeating Bradshaw.

==== Singles championship reigns and departure (2002–2003) ====
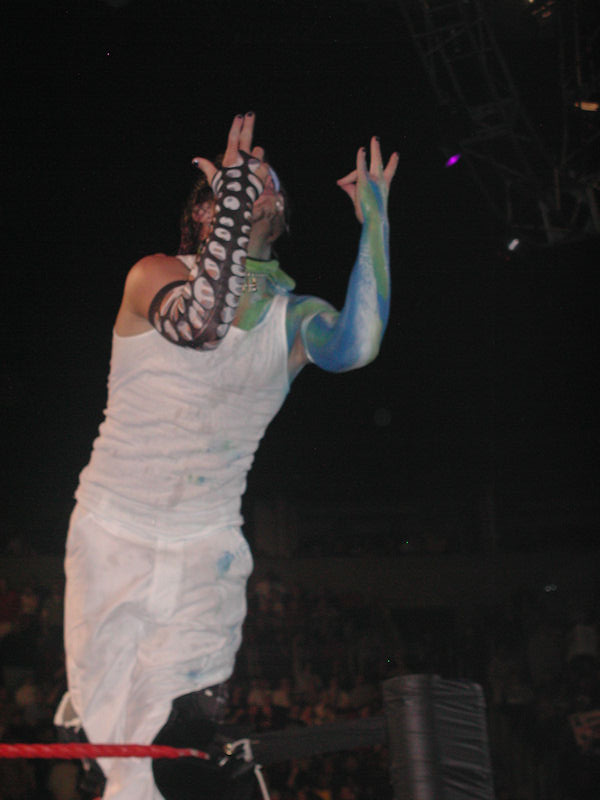
Hardy at a WWE live event in 2003

After years in the tag team division, Hardy took on The Undertaker in a ladder match for the WWE Undisputed Championship on the July 1 episode of Raw. Hardy came up short in the intense match, but earned The Undertaker's respect when he displayed courage by attempting to rise to his feet after the bout and challenge The Undertaker to continue. Hardy competed for singles titles on several occasions and defeated William Regal for the European Championship on the July 8 episode of Raw. Hardy was defeated a few weeks later by Rob Van Dam on the July 22 episode of Raw in a ladder match to unify the European Championship and the Intercontinental Championship, and the European Championship was retired. Finally, the Hardy Boyz split apart, as Hardy continued to pursue his singles ambitions on Raw and his brother, Matt left Raw for his own singles pursuits signing with Stephanie McMahon's SmackDown! brand. On Raw, Hardy would compete in WWE's Hardcore division until the title's unification with the Intercontinental Championship.

In late 2002, Hardy had been teaming with Rob Van Dam and Bubba Ray Dudley. He along with Bubba Ray and Spike Dudley defeated 3-Minute Warning at Survivor Series on November 17 in a six-man tag team elimination tables match.

In January 2003, Hardy participated in that years Royal Rumble match being eliminated by RVD. Hardy briefly turned into a heel (villain) after he attacked Van Dam and attempted to attack Shawn Michaels. It ended a month later when he tried to save Stacy Keibler from an attack by Christian and Chris Jericho to no avail. In February, he had a brief program with Michaels, which saw the two team up. Then, in storyline, Hardy began dating Trish Stratus after saving her from Steven Richards and Victoria in March. Hardy and Stratus had a brief on-screen relationship that saw the duo talking backstage and teaming together in matches. Hardy competed in his final match (his first departure) against The Rock and lost. Hardy was released from WWE on April 22, 2003. The reasons given for the release were Hardy's erratic behavior, drug use, refusal to go to rehab, deteriorating ring performance, as well as constant tardiness and no-showing events. Hardy also cited "burn out" and the need for time off as reasons for leaving WWE.

=== Independent circuit (2003) ===
On May 24, 2003, Hardy made his first wrestling appearance after being released by WWE during a show for the promotion OMEGA. There, he used his old gimmick, "Willow the Wisp", and challenged Krazy K in a match for the OMEGA Cruiserweight Championship, in which he was defeated.

=== Ring of Honor (2003) ===
This same year, he also appeared on Ring of Honor (ROH) at the event Death Before Dishonour, once again as "Willow the Wisp", wearing a mask and a trench coat. As Willow, he participated in a triple-threat match against Joey Matthews and Krazy K, having the victory and during the which he was quickly unmasked and lost his jacket, being left in an attire similar to the one he wore in WWE. Because of this, he was booed before, during, and after the match by the ROH audience, who chanted "We want Matt!" and "You got fired!".

=== Total Nonstop Action Wrestling (2004–2006) ===
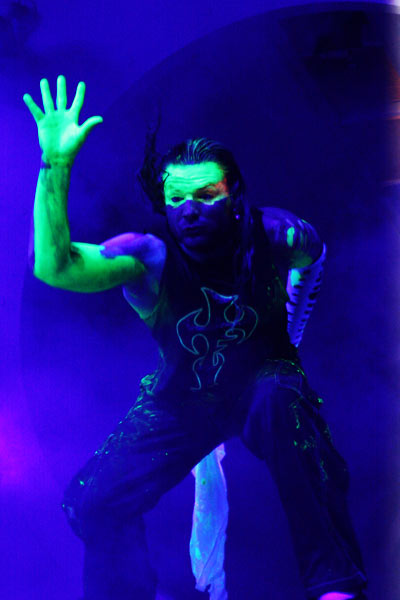
Hardy at a TNA event in 2005

Hardy debuted in Total Nonstop Action Wrestling (TNA) on June 23, 2004, at the Second Anniversary Show, in a match against A.J. Styles, for the TNA X Division Championship. He also debuted his new entrance theme "Modest", a song performed by Hardy himself, and a new nickname, "The Charismatic Enigma". The match ended in a no contest when Kid Kash and Dallas interfered. Hardy returned to TNA on July 21 and was awarded a shot at the NWA World Heavyweight Championship. Hardy challenged for the title on September 8, losing to NWA World Heavyweight Champion Jeff Jarrett. In October, he won a tournament, earning a shot at the NWA World Heavyweight Championship on November 7 at Victory Road, TNA's first monthly pay-per-view. Hardy was defeated by Jarrett once again in a ladder match at Victory Road following interference from Kevin Nash and Scott Hall.

At Turning Point on December 5, Hardy, Styles and Randy Savage defeated Jarrett, Hall and Nash (collectively known as the Kings of Wrestling). Hardy went on to defeat Hall in a singles match, substituting for Héctor Garza at Final Resolution on January 16, 2005.

At Against All Odds on February 13, Hardy lost to Abyss in a "Full Metal Mayhem" match for the number one contendership to the NWA World Heavyweight Championship. Hardy returned the favor by defeating Abyss in a Falls Count Anywhere match at Destination X on March 13. On the March 25 episode of Impact!, Hardy teamed with Shocker defeating David Young and Lex Lovett. Hardy then went on to feud with Raven, Hardy defeated Raven in a Six sides of steel match at Lockdown on April 24. Hardy was suspended from TNA after no-showing his "Clockwork Orange House of Fun" rematch with Raven at Hard Justice on May 15, allegedly due to travel difficulties. Hardy's suspension was lifted on August 5, and he returned at Sacrifice on August 14, attacking Jeff Jarrett.

He wrestled his first TNA match in four months at Unbreakable on September 11, losing to Bobby Roode following interference from Jarrett. Throughout October 2005, Hardy became embroiled in a feud with Abyss, Rhino and Sabu. The four-way feud culminated in a Monster's Ball match at Bound for Glory on October 23, which Rhino won after delivering a second rope Rhino Driver to Hardy. In the course of the match, Hardy delivered a Swanton Bomb to Abyss from a height of approximately 22 ft 0 in (6.71 m). Later that night, Hardy competed in a ten-man battle royal for the number one contendership to the NWA World Heavyweight Championship, which Rhino also won. At Genesis on November 13, Hardy lost to Monty Brown in another number one contender match.

On December 11, 2005, Hardy was scheduled to wrestle on the pre-show of Turning Point, but no-showed the event, citing traveling problems. Hardy was suspended as a result and did not appear on TNA television again. Hardy was released from his TNA contract in June 2006.

=== Return to independent circuit (2006) ===
From March 2006 to May 2006, Hardy appeared at various United Wrestling Federation (UWF) events across Virginia and North Carolina. The UWF were affiliated with TNA, and Hardy competed against TNA names such as AJ Styles, Jeff Jarrett and Eric Young.

=== Return to WWE (2006–2009) ===
==== The Hardy Boyz reunion (2006–2007) ====
On August 4, 2006, WWE announced that Hardy had re-signed with the company. In the following weeks, vignettes aired hyping his return on the August 21 episode of Raw. On the day of his return, Hardy confronted then-WWE Champion, Edge, before an altercation between the two that ended when Lita pulled Edge out of the ring, preventing Hardy from delivering a Swanton Bomb. After failing to capture the Intercontinental Championship from Johnny Nitro over the next few weeks, including at Unforgiven on September 17, Hardy finally defeated Nitro to win his second Intercontinental Championship on the October 2 episode of Raw. On the November 6 episode of Raw, Hardy lost the Intercontinental Championship back to Nitro, after Nitro hit him with the Intercontinental Championship title belt. One week later, Hardy regained the Intercontinental Championship from Nitro on the November 13 episode of Raw, with a crucifix pin. This marked Hardy's third reign as Intercontinental Champion.

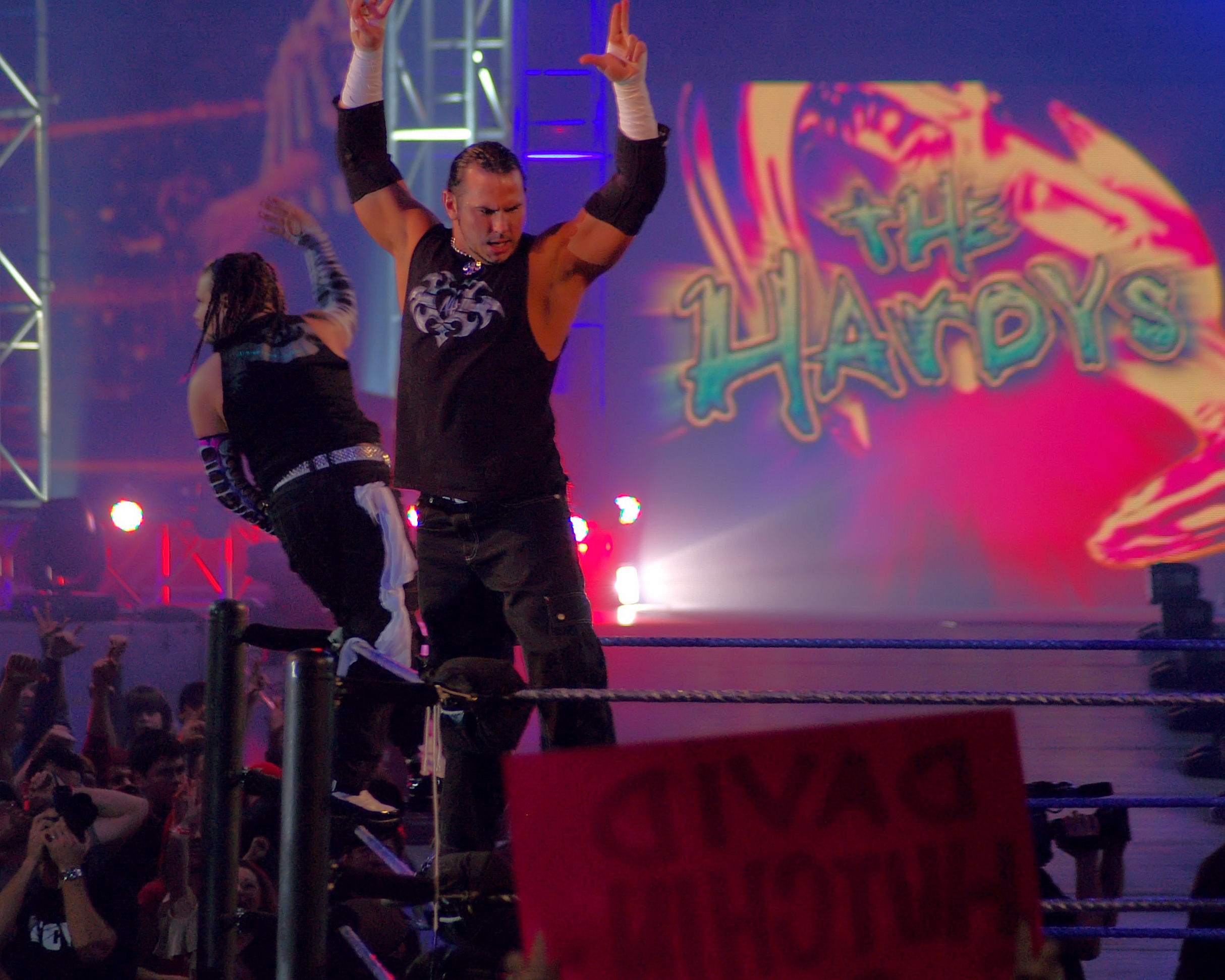
Jeff and Matt at December to Dismember, making their entrances

On the November 21 episode of ECW, Hardy teamed with his brother, Matt, for the first time in four years to defeat The Full Blooded Italians. At Survivor Series on November 26, they both were a part of Team D-Generation X, which gained the victory over Team Rated-RKO with a clean sweep. The brothers then received their first opportunity since Hardy's return to win a tag team championship at Armageddon on December 17. They competed in a four-team ladder match for the WWE Tag Team Championship, but they came up short in their attempt. In the course of the match, however, they inadvertently legitimately injured Joey Mercury's face.

With Hardy still feuding with Johnny Nitro and the other members of MNM, he was challenged once again by Nitro at New Year's Revolution on January 7, 2007, in a steel cage match for the Intercontinental Championship. Hardy once again defeated Nitro. Hardy then teamed with Matt to defeat MNM at both the Royal Rumble on January 28 and No Way Out on February 18 (the latter in which they teamed with Chris Benoit and MVP teamed with MNM). The next night on the February 19 episode of Raw, Hardy lost the Intercontinental Championship to Umaga. Hardy competed in the Money in the Bank ladder match at WrestleMania 23 on April 1. During the match, Matt threw Edge onto a ladder and encouraged Hardy, who was close to the winning briefcase, to finish Edge off. Hardy then leaped off the 20-foot-high (6.1 m) ladder, drove Edge through the ladder with a leg drop, injuring both Edge and himself. The two were unable to continue the match and were removed from ringside on stretchers.

The night after WrestleMania on the April 2 episode of Raw, the Hardys competed in a 10-team battle royal for the World Tag Team Championship. They won the titles from then WWE Champion John Cena and Shawn Michaels by last eliminating Lance Cade and Trevor Murdoch. They then began a feud with Cade and Murdoch, with the Hardys retaining the Championship in their first title defense against them at Backlash on April 29 and again at Judgment Day on May 20. The Hardys then defended their titles against The World's Greatest Tag Team in a Ladder match at One Night Stand on June 3. However, the next night on Raw, the Hardys lost the titles to Cade and Murdoch, competing through injuries sustained in their previous night's ladder match. The Hardys earned a rematch at Vengeance: Night of Champions on June 24 but were defeated.

==== Intercontinental Champion (2007–2008) ====
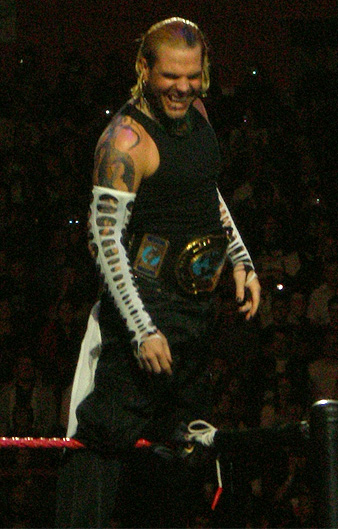
Jeff Hardy as Intercontinental Champion in 2007

In the midst of feuding with Umaga, who defeated Hardy at The Great American Bash on July 22 to retain the Intercontinental Championship, Hardy was abruptly taken off WWE programming. He posted on his own website and in the forums of TheHardyShow.com that it was time off to heal, stemming from a bad fall taken in a match against Mr. Kennedy on the July 23 episode of Raw. He made his return on the August 27 episode of Raw, defeating Kennedy by disqualification after Umaga interfered. The following week, on the September 3 episode of Raw, Hardy captured his fourth Intercontinental Championship by defeating Umaga.

This was the start of a push for Hardy, and at Survivor Series on November 18, Hardy and Triple H were the last two men remaining to win the traditional elimination match. Hardy began an on and off tag team with Triple H, which eventually led to a respectful feud between the two. The rivalry continued at Armageddon on December 16, when Hardy defeated Triple H to become the number one contender for the WWE Championship at the Royal Rumble on January 27, 2008. In the weeks leading up to the Royal Rumble, Hardy and Randy Orton engaged in a personal feud, which began when Orton kicked Hardy's brother, Matt, in the head in the storyline on the December 31 episode of Raw. Hardy, in retaliation, performed a Swanton Bomb on Orton from the top of the Raw set on the January 14 episode of Raw and seemed to have all the momentum after coming out on top in their encounters. Hardy, however, lost the title match at the Royal Rumble, but was named as one of six men to compete in the Raw Elimination Chamber match at No Way Out on February 17, where he survived to the final two before being eliminated by the eventual winner, Triple H.

During the March 3 episode of Raw, Hardy appeared on Chris Jericho's "Highlight Reel" segment as a special guest, but ended up attacking Jericho. This led to an Intercontinental title match on the following Raw where Hardy dropped the title to Jericho. Off-screen, Hardy dropped the title after he was suspended for sixty days, as of March 11, for his second violation of the company's Substance Abuse and Drug Testing Policy. Hardy was also removed from the Money in the Bank ladder match at WrestleMania XXIV on March 30 in which he was booked to win after the suspension was announced. Hardy returned on the May 12 episode of Raw, defeating Umaga. This reignited the rivalry between the two, and they met in a Falls Count Anywhere match at One Night Stand on June 1, which Hardy won.

==== World Championship reigns and second departure (2008–2009) ====
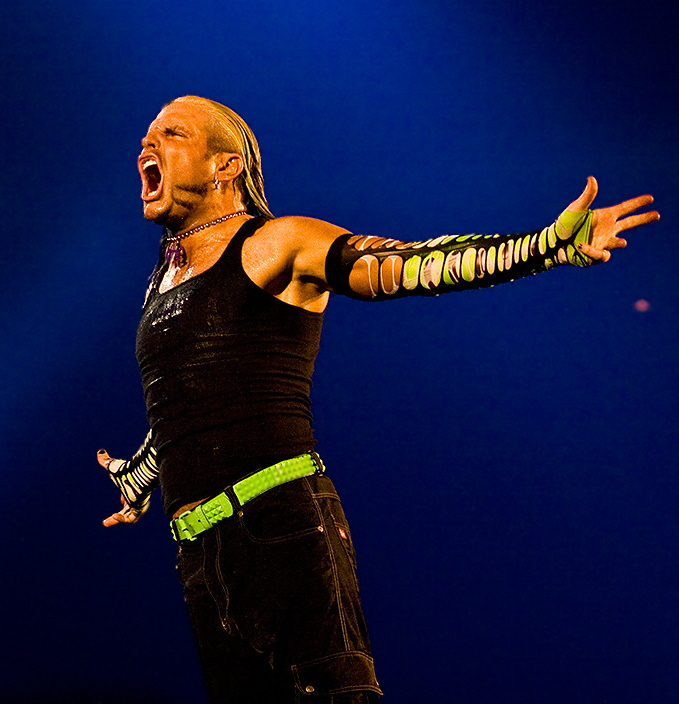
Hardy in November 2008

On the June 23 episode of Raw, Hardy was drafted to the SmackDown brand as a part of the 2008 WWE draft. Hardy made his debut for the brand on the July 4 episode of SmackDown, defeating John Morrison. Hardy participated in the WWE Championship Scramble match at Unforgiven on September 7 and also challenged for the championship at No Mercy on October 5 and Cyber Sunday on October 26, but failed to win each time. He was originally scheduled to be in the WWE Championship match at Survivor Series on November 23, but, in storyline, was found unconscious in his hotel stairwell, allowing the returning Edge to replace him in the match and win the title. At Armageddon on December 14, Hardy defeated Edge and Triple H in a triple threat match to capture the WWE Championship, his first world championship.

In January 2009, Hardy's next storyline led to his involvement in scripted accidents, including a hit-and-run automobile accident and an accident involving his ring entrance pyrotechnics. At the Royal Rumble on January 25, Hardy lost the WWE Championship back to Edge after Hardy's brother, Matt, interfered and turned on Hardy, hitting him with a steel chair. The buildup to this feud involved Matt implying that he was responsible for all of Hardy's accidents over the past few months, and at WrestleMania 25 on April 5, Matt defeated Hardy in an Extreme Rules match and in a stretcher match on the April 10 episode of SmackDown. In a rematch at Backlash on April 26, however, Hardy defeated Matt in an "I Quit" match to end the feud.

On the following episode of SmackDown, Hardy won a fatal four-way elimination match to become the number one contender for Edge's World Heavyweight Championship at Judgment Day on May 17, but lost to Edge after Matt interfered and attacked him. Hardy then defeated Edge in a non-title match on the following SmackDown to earn the right to choose the stipulation for their rematch at Extreme Rules on June 7 and chose a ladder match. At Extreme Rules, Hardy won the match to become World Heavyweight Champion for the first time. Immediately after the match, CM Punk cashed in his Money in the Bank briefcase and defeated Hardy to win the championship. He received his rematch against Punk in a triple threat match also involving Edge on the June 15 episode of Raw, but failed to win. Hardy got another rematch at The Bash on June 28, and won the match via disqualification after Punk kicked the ref in the back while feigning an eye injury with Punk still retaining the title. At Night of Champions on July 26, however, Hardy defeated Punk to win the championship for the second time. He made his first successful title defense five days later on SmackDown by defeating John Morrison. After the match, he was attacked by Punk, who invoked his rematch for the following week, where Hardy retained the championship after interference from Matt Hardy, who was the special guest enforcer. Punk again attacked Hardy post-match, resulting in Teddy Long announcing a Tables, Ladders, and Chairs match between the two for the World Heavyweight Championship at SummerSlam on August 23. The next week, Hardy showed up (kayfabe) injured from Punk's attack, and was forced to compete in a handicap match against the Hart Dynasty, which he lost. CM Punk attacked Hardy again and was about to injure his neck with a steel chair until Matt Hardy came to the save and helped Hardy up, turning Matt face and reuniting the Hardys once again. At SummerSlam, Hardy lost the World Heavyweight Championship back to Punk. On the August 28 episode of SmackDown, Hardy lost to Punk in a steel cage rematch for the World Heavyweight Championship with the stipulation "loser leaves WWE", resulting in Hardy leaving WWE, in storyline. This storyline was put in place to allow Hardy to leave WWE to heal his injuries, including a neck injury. Hardy also had two herniated discs in his lower back and was suffering from restless legs syndrome. Jeff Hardy's contract with WWE expired that week thus ending his 3-year stint with the company.

=== Return to TNA (2010–2017) ===
==== Immortal (2010–2011) ====
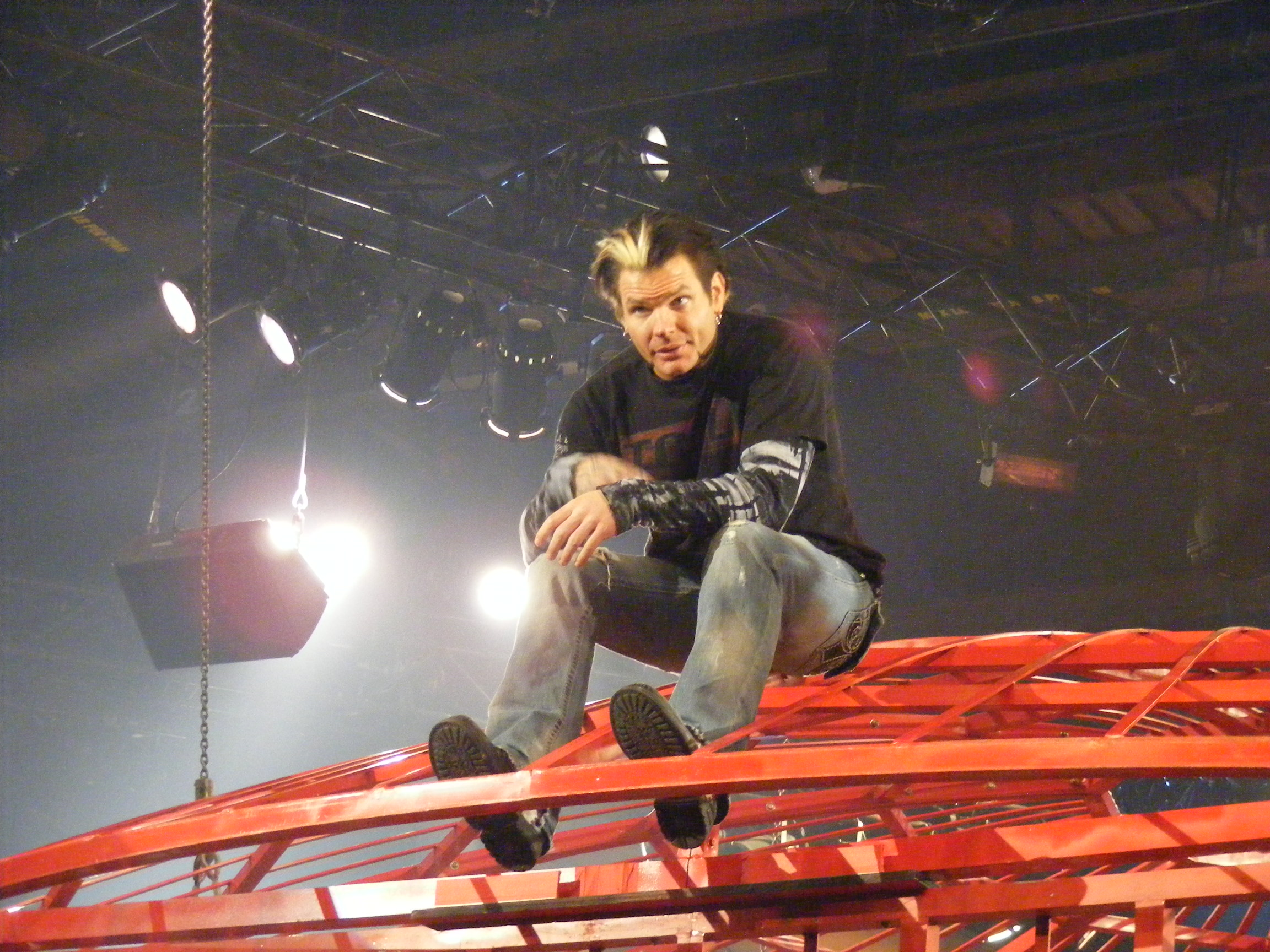
Hardy during his return to TNA at the live Impact! on January 4, 2010

On TNA's first live Monday episode of Impact! on January 4, 2010, Hardy made his return to TNA, along with Shannon Moore. He was attacked by Homicide after emerging from the crowd, but hit Homicide with a steel chair and performed the Twist of Fate on the Impact! Zone ramp. He later appeared in backstage segments throughout the evening. The following day, it was reported that Hardy had signed a new contract with TNA. Hardy would make his next appearance for the company on the March 8 episode of Impact!, saving D'Angelo Dinero, Abyss and Hulk Hogan from A.J. Styles, Ric Flair and Desmond Wolfe. The following week, Hardy defeated then TNA World Heavyweight Champion A.J. Styles in a non-title match.

On the April 5 episode of Impact!, Hardy was introduced as a member of Team Hogan for the annual Lethal Lockdown match, where they would face Team Flair. One week later, however, Hardy was injured when James Storm spewed a volatile liquid against a flame from his lighter, forming a fireball that singed most of Hardy's face. At Lockdown on April 18, Team Hogan (Hardy, Abyss, Jeff Jarrett and Rob Van Dam) defeated Team Flair (Sting, Desmond Wolfe, Robert Roode and James Storm). At Sacrifice on May 16, Hardy defeated Mr. Anderson. After Sacrifice, Anderson turned face and eventually managed to convince the skeptical Hardy that he really had changed, after which the two went on to form a tag team. At Slammiversary VIII on June 13, Hardy and Anderson, now known as Enigmatic Assholes, defeated Beer Money, Inc. (Robert Roode and James Storm) in a tag team match.

On the August 19 episode of Impact!, the TNA World Heavyweight Championship was vacated after Rob Van Dam was injured by Abyss. Hardy was entered into an eight-man tournament for the championship, defeating Rob Terry in his first round match. At the semi-finals at No Surrender on September 5, Hardy first wrestled Kurt Angle to a twenty-minute time-limit draw, after which Eric Bischoff ordered a five-minute period of extra time. After that and a second five-minute extra time period also ended in draws, it was ruled that Angle was unable to continue and the match ended in a no contest. After wrestling a draw on the September 16 episode of Impact!, it was announced that both Hardy and Angle would advance to the finals at Bound for Glory on October 10, where they would compete with Mr. Anderson in a three-way match.

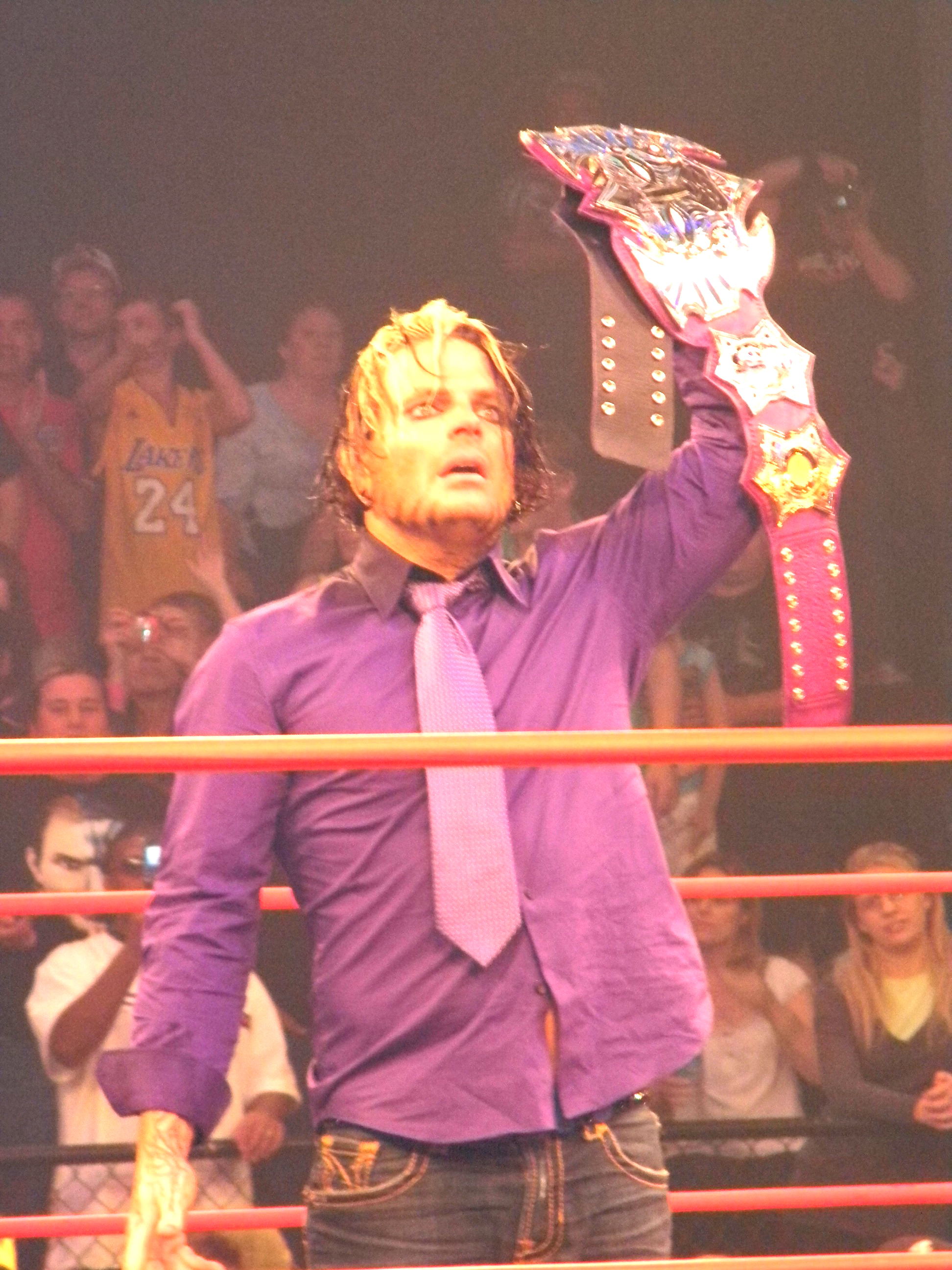
Hardy as the TNA World Heavyweight Champion in November 2010

At Bound for Glory, Hardy turned heel with Hulk Hogan and Eric Bischoff and with their help defeated Angle and Anderson to win the TNA World Heavyweight Championship for the first time. They were then joined by Jeff Jarrett and Abyss, revealing the group that Abyss had been referring to as "they" for several months. On the following episode of Impact!, the stable was named Immortal, as it formed an alliance with Ric Flair's Fortune. Meanwhile, Hardy debuted a new dark character, using cryptic messages as he explained the reasons behind his turn. At Turning Point on November 7, Hardy retained his title in a defense against Matt Morgan, a replacement for Mr. Anderson, who was sidelined after suffering a concussion during an attack by Hardy. On the following episode of Impact!, Hogan presented Hardy with a new design of the TNA World Heavyweight Championship, which he dubbed the TNA Immortal Championship. At Final Resolution on December 5, Hardy successfully defended the championship in a rematch against Morgan after incapacitating the special guest referee Mr. Anderson and having a replacement referee count the pinfall. On January 4, 2011, Hardy made his debut for New Japan Pro-Wrestling (NJPW) at Wrestle Kingdom V in Tokyo Dome, where he successfully defended the TNA World Heavyweight Championship against Tetsuya Naito.

On January 9 at Genesis, Hardy's brother, Matt, made his TNA debut as a surprise member of Immortal and defeated Rob Van Dam to prevent him from receiving a match at Hardy's championship. That same night, Hardy gave Anderson a match for the TNA World Heavyweight Championship, immediately following Anderson's victory in a number one contender's match. Despite Matt, Flair, and Bischoff interfering in an attempt to help Hardy, Anderson defeated Hardy for the championship. On the January 13 episode of Impact!, the Hardy Boyz reunited and defeated Anderson and Van Dam in a tag team match, following interference from Beer Money, Inc. On the February 3 episode of Impact!, Hardy received his rematch for the TNA World Heavyweight Championship. The rest of Immortal interfered in the match, but were stopped by Fortune, which led to Anderson retaining the championship. On February 13 at Against All Odds, Hardy defeated Anderson in a ladder match to regain the TNA World Heavyweight Championship. Hardy held the championship for less than two weeks, defending it once against Rob Van Dam, before losing it to the returning Sting on February 24, at the tapings of the March 3 episode of Impact!.

==== Victory Road incident ====
On March 13 at Victory Road, Hardy received a rematch for the title under No Disqualification rules, but was defeated in ninety seconds. TNA had made the decision to cut the match short after deeming that Hardy was too intoxicated to wrestle, coming out visibly under the influence during his entrance. The following day it was reported that TNA had sent Hardy home from the week's Impact! tapings. On the March 17 episode of Impact!, Immortal severed their ties with Hardy.

==== TNA World Heavyweight Champion (2011–2013) ====
On August 23, 2011, TNA announced that Hardy would be making his return to the promotion at the Impact Wrestling tapings on August 25 in Huntsville, Alabama. The return would take place only five days after Matt Hardy was released from his TNA contract. In his return, which was taped for the September 8 episode of Impact Wrestling, Hardy spoke to the audience, acknowledging that he had hit rock bottom at Victory Road in March, before asking the fans for "one more shot", turning face in the process. Hardy wrestled his first match in six months on September 15 at a live event in York, Pennsylvania, defeating Jeff Jarrett. Hardy then began feuding with his former stable Immortal, attacking Eric Bischoff on the October 6 episode of Impact Wrestling and engaging in brawls with Jeff Jarrett at Bound for Glory and on the October 20 episode of Impact Wrestling. Hardy wrestled his first televised match since his return on the October 27 episode of Impact Wrestling, defeating Immortal member Bully Ray. On November 13 at Turning Point, Hardy defeated Jeff Jarrett three times, first in six seconds, the second in six minutes, and the third in ten seconds. On December 11 at Final Resolution, Hardy defeated Jarrett in a steel cage match to become the number one contender to the TNA World Heavyweight Championship.

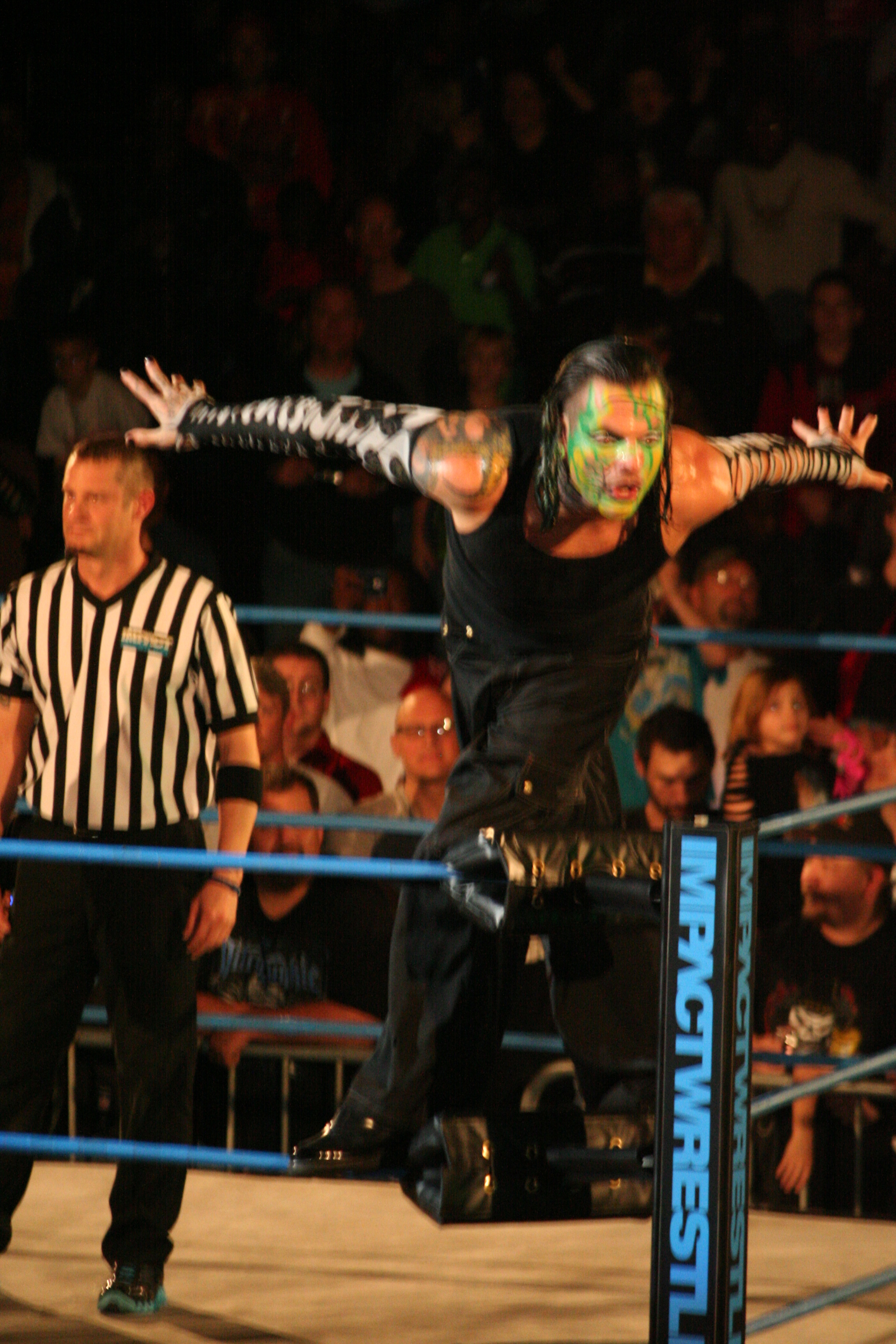
Hardy in February 2012

On January 8, 2012, at Genesis, Hardy defeated TNA World Heavyweight Champion Bobby Roode via disqualification and as a result the title remained with Roode. On the following episode of Impact Wrestling, a rematch between Hardy and Roode ended in a no contest, following interference from Bully Ray. The following week, Hardy was entered into a number one contender's match against James Storm, which ended in a no contest following interference from Ray and Roode. On February 12 at Against All Odds, Hardy was unable to capture the TNA World Heavyweight Championship from Roode in a four-way match, which also included Bully Ray and James Storm. On the following episode of Impact Wrestling, Hardy lost his shot at the TNA World Heavyweight Championship, following interference from the returning Kurt Angle. On March 18 at Victory Road, Hardy was defeated by Angle in a singles match. On April 15 at Lockdown, Hardy defeated Angle in a rematch, contested inside a steel cage. On the following episode of Impact Wrestling, Hardy and Mr. Anderson were defeated by Rob Van Dam in a three-way number one contender's match for the TNA World Heavyweight Championship. During the first "Open Fight Night" the following week, Hardy teamed up with Anderson to unsuccessfully challenge Magnus and Samoa Joe for the TNA World Tag Team Championship. On May 13 at Sacrifice, Hardy was defeated by Anderson in a singles match. On the following episode of Impact Wrestling, Hardy defeated Anderson in a rematch. On the live May 31 episode of Impact Wrestling, Hardy won a fan voting to become the number one contender to the TNA Television Championship. However, his title match with Devon ended in a no contest, following interference from Robbie E and Robbie T. On June 10 at Slammiversary, Hardy was defeated by Mr. Anderson in a three-way number one contender's match, also involving Rob Van Dam.

On the June 14 episode of Impact Wrestling, Hardy entered the 2012 Bound for Glory Series, taking part in the opening gauntlet match, from which he was the first man eliminated by Bully Ray. Hardy wrestled his final group stage match of the tournament on the September 6 episode of Impact Wrestling, defeating Samoa Joe via submission, thus finishing fourth and advancing to the semi-finals. Three days later at No Surrender, Hardy defeated Joe in a rematch to advance to the finals of the tournament. Before the finals took place, Hardy suffered a storyline injury after taking part in a brawl between the TNA locker room and the Aces & Eights stable. Despite the injury, Hardy defeated Bully Ray in the finals to win the 2012 Bound for Glory Series and become the number one contender to the TNA World Heavyweight Championship. On the following episode of Impact Wrestling, Hardy defeated Ray in a rematch to reaffirm his status as the number one contender.

On October 14 at Bound for Glory, Hardy defeated Austin Aries to win the TNA World Heavyweight Championship for the third time, and, according to TNA, completing his "road to redemption" following the events of March 2011. Hardy made his first televised title defense on the October 25 episode of Impact Wrestling, defeating Kurt Angle to retain his title. On November 11 at Turning Point, Hardy defeated Austin Aries in a ladder match to retain the TNA World Heavyweight Championship. On the December 6 episode of Impact Wrestling, Hardy was attacked by the Aces & Eights who were revealed to be paid off by his number one contender Bobby Roode. Three days later at Final Resolution, Hardy defeated Roode to retain the TNA World Heavyweight Championship, after which, both men were attacked by the Aces & Eights. On the following episode of Impact Wrestling, Aces & Eights member Devon revealed Austin Aries as the man who outpaid Roode for the Aces & Eights to interfere in their match, which led to Hardy issuing Aries a title challenge. The following week, Hardy was successful in retaining his title against Aries, following interference from Bobby Roode. The rivalry culminated in a three-way elimination match on January 13, 2013, at Genesis, where Hardy defeated both Aries and Roode to retain the TNA World Heavyweight Championship. On the January 24 episode of Impact Wrestling, Hardy successfully defended the TNA World Heavyweight Championship against Christopher Daniels. Afterwards, Hardy was jumped by a masked member of Aces & Eights who then injured Hardy's left leg with a ball-peen hammer. This was done to write Hardy out of the tapings in the United Kingdom, as the UK would not allow him to make appearances due to his criminal convictions. Hardy made his in-ring return on the February 28 episode of Impact Wrestling, teaming with his new number one contender Bully Ray to defeat Bad Influence (Christopher Daniels and Kazarian). On March 10 at Lockdown, Hardy lost the TNA World Heavyweight Championship to Ray in a steel cage match, following interference from the Aces & Eights, ending his reign at 147 days. On the March 21 episode of Impact Wrestling, Hardy defeated Kurt Angle, Magnus, and Samoa Joe in a four-way match to become number one contender for the TNA World Heavyweight Championship. Hardy received his title opportunity on the April 11 episode of Impact Wrestling, but was again defeated by Bully Ray in a Full Metal Mayhem match.

Hardy returned to TNA on June 2 at Slammiversary XI, teaming with Magnus and Samoa Joe in a winning effort against Aces & Eights (Garett Bischoff, Mr. Anderson, and Wes Brisco). As a result of previously winning the Bound for Glory Series, Hardy and Bobby Roode were entered into the 2013 Bound for Glory Series on the June 13 episode of Impact Wrestling. The following week, Hardy defeated Roode in his first BFG series match via pinfall to earn seven points in the tournament. Hardy's participation in the Bound for Glory series ended on the September 5 episode of Impact Wrestling, when he was eliminated from a twenty-point battle royal by Kazarian.

On the September 19 episode of Impact Wrestling, Hardy defeated X Division Champion Manik in a non-title match. On the October 3 episode of Impact Wrestling, Hardy teamed with Manik defeating Kenny King and Chris Sabin which led to the announcement of the Ultimate X match for the X Division Championship at Bound for Glory. On October 20, 2013, at Bound for Glory, Hardy debuted a new theme song and competed in his first Ultimate X match for the TNA X Division Championship but was unsuccessful as Chris Sabin won the match after an interference from Velvet Sky.

==== Willow (2013–2014) ====
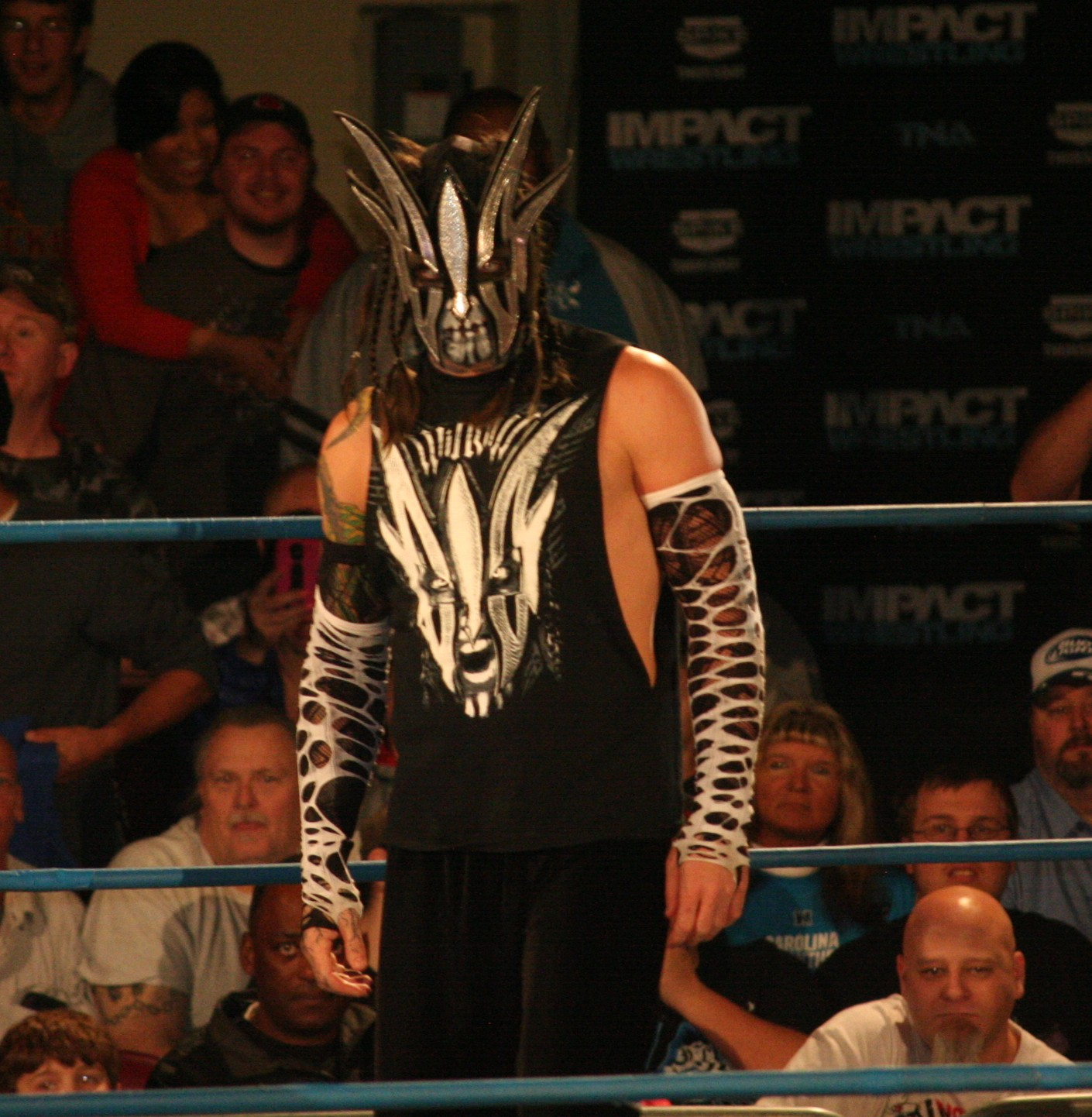
Hardy as Willow in April 2014

In November, Hardy entered the World Title Tournament to crown a new champion, after A.J. Styles left the company with the championship. Hardy defeated Chris Sabin and Bobby Roode in the first two rounds of the tournament, to reach the finals at Final Resolution. In the championship match, Hardy was defeated by Magnus after interference from Ethan Carter III and Rockstar Spud. The following week on Impact Wrestling, Hardy teamed up with Sting to face The BroMans, Ethan Carter III and Rockstar Spud, which they lost. Afterwards, a frustrated Hardy announced he could no longer work in TNA with Dixie Carter's backstage politics, and quit TNA.

In February 2014, strange vignettes began airing advertising Hardy's return to TNA under his OMEGA character, Willow. He made his TNA return at Lockdown, in the Lethal Lockdown match as part of Team MVP. He then appeared on the following episode of Impact Wrestling, facing Rockstar Spud. In the following weeks, he would continue to feud with Ethan Carter III and Rockstar Spud, leading to a tag-team match between them (with Kurt Angle as Willow's partner) at Sacrifice on April 27, Willow and Angle would go on to win that match. On the May 1 episode of Impact Wrestling, Willow defeated James Storm by disqualification when Storm shoved the referee and as Storm made his way up the ramp, Mr. Anderson appeared and hit Storm with the Mic check. On the May 8 episode of Impact Wrestling, Willow's match against Magnus ended in a DQ when Bram interfered and handcuffed Willow to the bottom rope and started to hit him with a metal turnbuckle. On the May 15 episode of Impact Wrestling, Willow defeated both Magnus and Bram in a two on one handicap match. On the May 22 episode of Impact Wrestling, Willow defeated Magnus in a Falls Count Anywhere match. On the June 5 episode of Impact Wrestling, Willow won his match against Bram by DQ when Magnus came to the ring and attacked him with a Steel Pry Bar. At Slammiversary XII, Willow was defeated by Magnus.

==== The Hardys third reunion (2014–2016) ====
On the July 10 episode of Impact Wrestling, Director of Wrestling Operations Kurt Angle asked Willow to bring Jeff Hardy back for a 20-man over the top rope battle royal later that night. Hardy competed in the match as himself and won, earning a match with Lashley for the TNA World Heavyweight Championship the following week, which Hardy lost.

On the July 24 Impact Wrestling, Hardy told the audience that we had not seen the last of Willow and then brought out Matt Hardy, his brother, to reform The Hardys. The Wolves joined them in the ring and challenged them to a match for the TNA World Tag Team Championship at Impact Wrestling: Destination X, which the Hardys agreed to. At Destination X, the Hardys lost against the Wolves, but shook hands after the match. On October 22, 2014, The Hardys entered a number one contenders tournament for the TNA World Tag Team Championships defeating The BroMans (Jessie Godderz and DJ Z) in the first round of the tournament. On October 29, episode of Impact Wrestling, The Hardys defeated Team Dixie (EC3 and Tyrus) in the semifinals to advance to the finals of the tournament where they defeated Samoa Joe and Low Ki to become number one contenders for the TNA World Tag Team Championship. On the January 7 episode of Impact Wrestling, Hardy along with his brother Matt were at ringside for The Wolves vs. James Storm and Abyss; during the match, The Great Sanada and Manik attempted to interfere in the match, but then ended up receiving a Side Effect from Matt Hardy, and a Twist of Fate from Jeff Hardy. Despite that, it distracted Eddie Edwards, who then received a Last Call super kick from Storm. At the Lockdown episode of Impact Wrestling, Hardy suffered a minor concussion which was set as a storyline injury when he fell on the door of the cage; James Storm hit Hardy off the door onto the steel steps below with a cowbell. The falling off the cage spot was covered in mainstream media such as USA Today and TMZ. Hardy returned after TNA United Kingdom tour. In March, The Hardys participated in a tournament for the vacant TNA World Tag Team Championship. On March 16, 2015, The Hardys won an Ultimate X match for the belts for the first time as a team and individually. On May 8, 2015, the Hardys were forced to vacate the TNA World Tag Team Championship due to Jeff suffering a broken leg in a legitimate dirt bike accident.

Hardy returned from injury on the July 29 episode of Impact Wrestling, making an announcement that his brother, Matt, would face TNA World Heavyweight Champion Ethan Carter III in a Full Metal Mayhem match, in which Matt was unsuccessful. After a brief hiatus, Hardy returned on the August 26 episode of Impact Wrestling, where he and Matt made an agreement that if Matt would lose his second match against Carter for the TNA World Heavyweight Championship, then Jeff would become his personal assistant. Matt was unsuccessful, and Jeff was forced to be Carter's assistant. On the September 23 episode of Impact Wrestling, after refusing to hit Spud, then hitting Carter with a Twist of Fate, Hardy quit as Carter's personal assistant, therefore also (storyline) quitting TNA. On the September 30 episode of Impact Wrestling, TNA President Dixie Carter announced that Hardy would be the special guest referee in the three-way dance TNA World Heavyweight Championship match between Carter, his brother Matt, and Drew Galloway at Bound for Glory. At the event, Hardy turned on Carter by hitting him with a steel chair with Matt hitting the Twist of Fate, thus giving Matt his first TNA World Heavyweight Championship. Hardy made an appearance on January 5, 2016, episode of Impact Wrestling on its live Pop TV debut backstage and ringside to support his brother Matt in the semi-finals and finals of the TNA World Title Series, which Matt had later lost.

==== Brother Nero (2016–2017) ====
On the January 12, 2016, episode of Impact Wrestling, Hardy made his return in a segment that involved Ethan Carter III denying Hardy an opportunity at the TNA World Heavyweight Championship, instead bringing out Shynron to face Hardy, with Hardy winning the match. On the January 26 episode of Impact Wrestling, Hardy issued a challenge to the villainous Matt Hardy for the TNA World Heavyweight Championship, as the match was set to begin he was attacked by Eric Young and Bram. Hardy returned on March 15 episode of Impact Wrestling, Jeff Hardy defeating Eric Young in a match to determine the third challenger for the TNA World Heavyweight Championship match in which included Matt Hardy and Ethan Carter III, which Jeff lost. After Matt losing the title, he started a feud with Jeff, he wanted an I Quit match against him. On the April 19 episode of Impact Wrestling, the match eventually ended up in a no-contest after neither man could continue.

On the May 10 episode of Impact Wrestling, Hardy teaming with James Storm against Decay in a losing effort after an Imposter Willow distracted Hardy. After the match, Hardy searched backstage for Imposter Willow but was attacked by three people dressed as Willow. On the May 17 episode of Impact Wrestling, Hardy defeated one of the Imposter Willows. Afterwards, Matt Hardy revealed himself to be one of the Imposter Willows behind the attacks on Jeff. In the following weeks, Matt Hardy would debut a new persona as a "Broken" man with part of his hair bleached blonde along with a strange British-like accent, blaming Jeff (who he began to refer to as "Brother Nero", Nero being Jeff's middle name) for breaking him and becoming obsessed with "deleting" him. On the June 28 episode of Impact Wrestling, Matt challenged Jeff to a final battle with the Hardy brand on the line, to take place at their home in Cameron, North Carolina the next week. On July 5, during special episode "The Final Deletion", Matt defeated Jeff in the match to become sole owner of the Hardy brand, forcing Jeff to drop his last name and become referred to as "Brother Nero". Also, Matt would force Jeff to stop using his high-flying moves in order to stop him from being a "spot monkey".

On the August 18 episode of Impact Wrestling, Brother Nero and Matt defeated The Tribunal, The BroMans and The Helms Dynasty in an "Ascension To Hell" match for an opportunity to challenge Decay for the TNA World Tag Team Championship. On September 8, they faced Decay in a match held at the Hardy compound dubbed "Delete or Decay", where Brother Nero would again sacrifice himself to save Matt from Abyss. At Bound for Glory, the Hardys defeated Decay in what was dubbed "The Great War" to win the TNA World Tag Team Championship for the second time. On the October 6 episode of Impact Wrestling, they successfully defended their titles against Decay, in a Wolf Creek match. During the match, Brother Nero "transformed" into Willow and his Hardy Show persona Itchweeed during the pre-recorded backstage fighting.

On the November 3 episode of Impact Wrestling, the Hardys successfully defended their titles against The Tribunal. After the match, the Hardys were attacked by the masked trio known as Death Crew Council (DCC), with Matt later suffered (kayfabe) amnesia after being knocked off a forklift by one of the DCC members. On the December 1 episode of Impact Wrestling, Matt returned to the ring, ambushing DCC by using their entrance theme; he would accept DCC's title challenge. The Hardys faced Bram and Kingston, and Matt would pin Kingston to retain the titles. In the following weeks, the Hardys would issue an open challenge for the tag team titles. On December 15, during special episode "Total Nonstop Deletion", they were once again successful in retaining. Brother Nero hit Crazzy Steve with the Twist of Fate, who then fell into a volcano (that had appeared on the compound in the weeks leading up the event), and was shot up into the sky, landing in the ring. Matt then covered him to win the match. Hardy had previously debuted the Itchweeed character earlier in the episode, defeating Chet Sterling.

On the January 12, 2017, episode of Impact Wrestling, The Hardys successfully defended their titles against The Wolves; Jeff would roll up Davey Richards to retain the titles. The following week, on the inaugural Race for the Case tournament, Jeff won the green case. At Genesis, The Hardys retained their titles against the DCC and Decay in a three-way tag team match. On Open Fight Night, the Hardys would begin a storyline where they would teleport to different promotions and win that promotions' tag team championship gold, which was referred to by Matt as their "Expedition of Gold". Jeff called out Lashley for the TNA World Heavyweight Championship, but he was unsuccessful in his attempt at winning it.

On February 27, the Hardys announced their departure from TNA, after contract talks broke down between the two parties. Though the two sides were reportedly close to a contract agreement, talks began to break down and changes in management prompted their departure from the company. The TNA World Tag Team Championships were vacated due to the Hardys' departure and was explained on TNA television in a segment where The Hardys would teleport to their next Expedition of Gold destination, but a technicality resulted in them disappearing and the belts appearing in the arms of Decay.

=== Return to ROH (2017) ===
On March 4, 2017, Hardy returned to Ring of Honor at Manhattan Mayhem VI where he teamed with his brother and they defeated The Young Bucks for the ROH World Tag Team Championship. They then lost the titles back to The Young Bucks in a ladder match on April 1 at Supercard of Honor XI, to which after the match, Jeff was noted as staying in the ring and saying "We'll fade away and classify ourselves as obsolete", paying homage to their "Broken" characters. It was also announced after the match that both Matt and Jeff Hardy's contracts had expired.

=== Second return to WWE (2017–2021) ===
==== The Hardy Boyz's return (2017–2018) ====
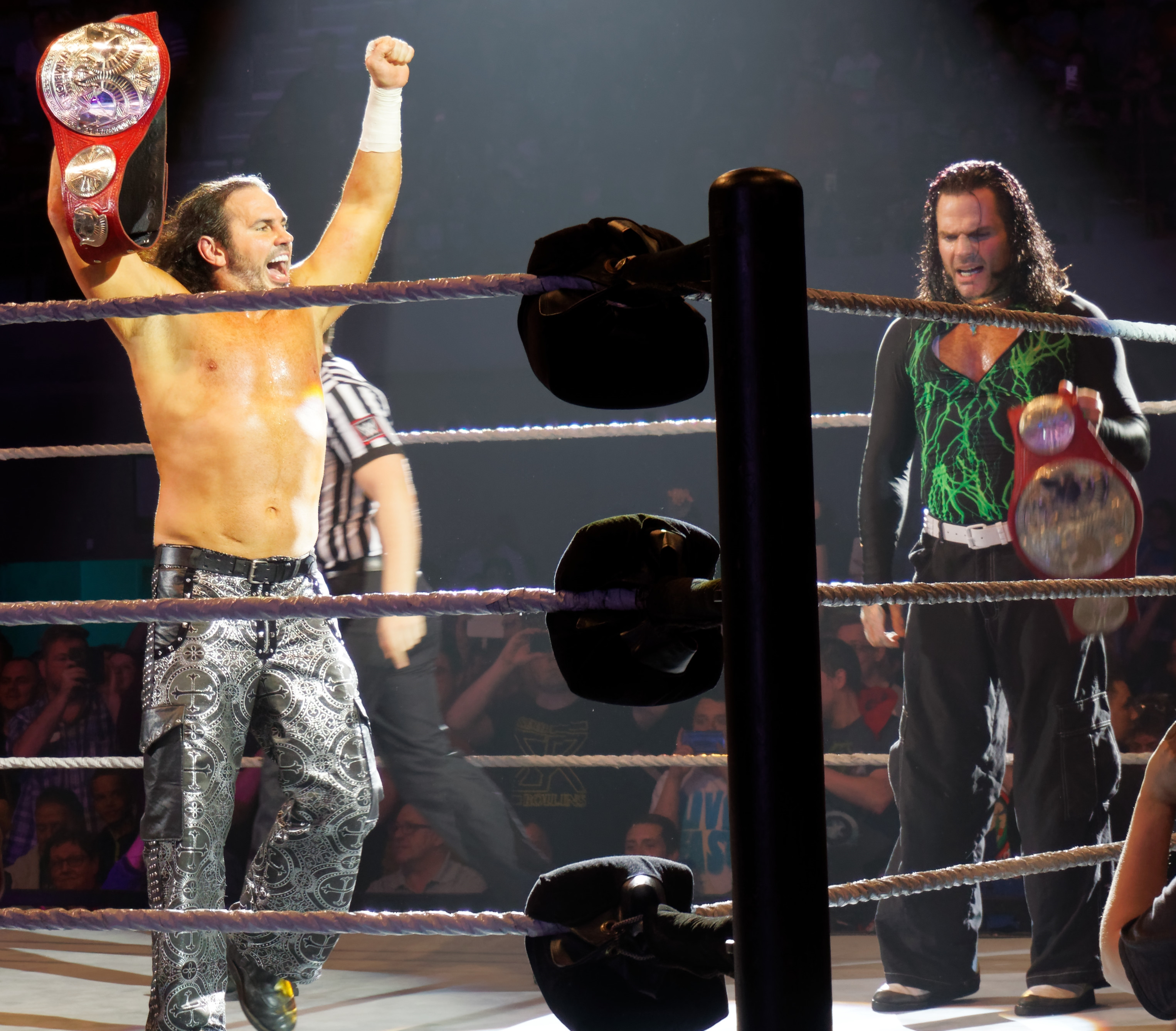
The Hardy Boyz as Raw Tag Team Champions in May 2017

At the WrestleMania 33 pay-per-view on April 2, 2017, Hardy made his surprise return to WWE, along with his brother Matt Hardy, being added as last-minute participants in the ladder match for the Raw Tag Team Championship, defeating Luke Gallows and Karl Anderson, Cesaro and Sheamus, and Enzo Amore and Big Cass to win the Raw Tag Team Championship. Also, it was their first win as a team at WrestleMania, as well as Hardy's first victory at WrestleMania. The next night on Raw, The Hardy Boyz successfully defended the title against Luke Gallows and Karl Anderson. At Payback, The Hardy Boyz retained their championships against Cesaro and Sheamus, who attacked them after the match. The next night on Raw, Cesaro and Sheamus explained their actions, claiming the fans were more supportive of 'novelty acts' from the past like The Hardy Boyz, who they feel did not deserve to be in the match at WrestleMania 33. Subsequently, at Extreme Rules, The Hardy Boyz lost the titles against Cesaro and Sheamus in a steel cage match, and failed to regain it back the following month at the Great Balls of Fire event.

On the August 28 episode of Raw, Hardy won a battle royal by last eliminating Jason Jordan to become the number one contender for the Intercontinental Championship, but was unsuccessful in his challenge the following week. In September, Hardy suffered his first major injury which was a shoulder injury and it was reported that the injury would sideline him for four to six months. On January 22, 2018, Hardy made a special appearance on the 25th-anniversary episode of Raw in a poker segment also involving The APA, Ted DiBiase, and many other wrestlers. On the March 19 episode of Raw, Hardy also made a cameo appearance in a segment, calling "The Ultimate Deletion" between Matt Hardy and Bray Wyatt, allowing his brother Matt to pick up the victory.

==== Championship reigns (2018–2020) ====
On the April 9 episode of Raw, Hardy returned from injury, where he assisted Finn Bálor and Seth Rollins in a confrontation with The Miz and The Miztourage (Bo Dallas and Curtis Axel). Later that night, Hardy teaming up with Bálor and Rollins to defeat Miz and Miztourage. The following week on Raw, Hardy defeated Jinder Mahal to win the United States Championship, making him the second person to complete the modern Grand Slam, after completing the original format separately. The next day, Hardy was traded to the SmackDown brand as part of the Superstar Shake-up, and took the title with him. Later on that day, Hardy defeated Shelton Benjamin in his first match on the SmackDown brand since 2009. Hardy retained his title against Jinder Mahal at the Greatest Royal Rumble event on April 27, and against Randy Orton at Backlash on May 6. Two days later on the May 8 episode of SmackDown Live, Hardy lost to The Miz in a qualifying match for the 2018 pay-per-view Money in the Bank ladder match. Two weeks later on the May 22 episode of SmackDown Live, Hardy faced Daniel Bryan in an attempt to earn another Money in the Bank qualifying match, which he lost.

At Extreme Rules, Hardy lost the title to Shinsuke Nakamura, after a pre-match low blow by Nakamura, ending his reign at 90 days. After the match, Randy Orton attacked Hardy with a low blow. Two days later on SmackDown Live, Hardy had a rematch with Nakamura, winning by disqualification after Orton attacked Hardy. Hardy received another rematch at SummerSlam, but was again defeated by Nakamura. On the August 21 episode of SmackDown Live, Hardy and Orton faced off in a match that ended in a no-contest, with Hardy continuing to attack Orton after the match. The following week, Hardy challenged Orton to a Hell in a Cell match at the namesake pay-per-view, which Orton accepted. At the event on September 16, Hardy lost to Orton.

After nearly a month off, Hardy returned on the October 9 episode of SmackDown Live, defeating Samoa Joe to qualify for the WWE World Cup tournament at Crown Jewel. At the event, Hardy lost to The Miz in the first round of the tournament. On the November 6 episode of SmackDown Live, Hardy lost to Samoa Joe in an attempt to join Team SmackDown at Survivor Series. However, the following week, Hardy defeated Andrade "Cien" Almas to earn a spot on Team SmackDown, after team member Daniel Bryan was removed from the match. At Survivor Series, Team SmackDown lost to Team Raw. At the Royal Rumble pay-per-view on January 27, 2019, Hardy participated in the Royal Rumble match, but was unsuccessful. At Elimination Chamber, Hardy failed to capture the WWE Championship in an Elimination Chamber match, after being eliminated by Daniel Bryan.

On the February 26 episode SmackDown Live, Hardy teamed with the returning Matt Hardy to defeat The Bar (Cesaro and Sheamus). At WrestleMania 35 on April 7, Hardy competed in the André the Giant Memorial Battle Royal, but was eliminated by eventual winner, Braun Strowman. Two days later on SmackDown Live, The Hardy Boyz defeated The Usos (Jey Uso and Jimmy Uso) to win the SmackDown Tag Team Championship, their ninth tag team championship together in WWE. The reign only lasted 21 days, as they had to vacate the title due to Hardy injuring his knee, this was explained in storyline as injuries afflicted by Lars Sullivan. WWE announced that Hardy would be out of action for six to nine months.

On the March 13, 2020, episode of SmackDown, Hardy returned from injury, defeating King Corbin. He began a feud with Sheamus over comments that the latter made, defeating him in the first round of the Intercontinental Championship tournament on the May 22 episode of SmackDown. The following week on SmackDown, Hardy was "arrested" (kayfabe) after crashing his car into Elias, however later in the episode, Hardy would cause a distraction for Sheamus, costing him a match against Daniel Bryan, and attacked Sheamus after the match. The feud led to a match at Backlash, which Hardy lost. On the July 24 episode of SmackDown, Hardy defeated Sheamus in a Bar Fight, ending their feud. On the August 14 episode of SmackDown, Hardy issued a challenge to the Intercontinental Champion AJ Styles for the title. The following week on SmackDown, he defeated Styles to win the Intercontinental Championship for the fifth time. On the August 28 episode of SmackDown, Hardy retained the title against Shinsuke Nakamura. At Clash of Champions, Hardy lost the title to Sami Zayn in a triple threat ladder match, which included AJ Styles. On the October 2 episode of SmackDown, he received a rematch for the title but he was unsuccessful.

==== Final feuds and departure (2020–2021) ====
As part of the 2020 Draft in October, Hardy was drafted to the Raw brand. On the October 12 episode of Raw, Hardy would face Seth Rollins and AJ Styles in a triple threat match, but a returning Elias would attack Hardy, thus starting a feud between them. At Hell in a Cell, Hardy lost to Elias by disqualification after he hit him with a guitar. Hardy then defeated Elias in a Guitar on a Pole match on the November 2 episode of Raw, and in a Symphony of Destruction match on the November 30 episode of Raw. On January 26, 2021, at the Royal Rumble, Hardy entered the Royal Rumble match at number 5, but was eliminated by Dolph Ziggler. On the February 1 episode of Raw, Hardy would team with a returning Carlito to defeat Elias and Jaxson Ryker to end his feud with Elias. At Elimination Chamber, Hardy unsuccessfully challenged for the WWE Championship in an Elimination Chamber match after being eliminated by Drew McIntyre. On the June 7 episode of Raw, Hardy defeated Cedric Alexander in a match where had Hardy lost, he would have retired. He defeated Alexander once more on the following episode of Raw.

On the July 19 episode of Raw, Hardy, who by popular demand notably brought back his "No More Words" entrance theme song by Endeverafter for the first time since his 2009 departure (all of his appearances since his WrestleMania 33 return before this one were to "Loaded", which doubles as his tag team entrance with brother Matt), defeated NXT Champion Karrion Kross, becoming the first man in WWE to defeat Kross by pinfall. On the September 6 episode of Raw, Hardy was seen chasing the 24/7 Championship, which was heavily criticized by fans. The following Raw, Hardy challenged Damian Priest for the WWE United States Championship, but lost. On the September 20 episode of Raw, Hardy would defeat Sheamus to be added to the United States title match at Extreme Rules. At the event, Hardy would fail to win the title as Damian Priest would retain. He then entered a brief feud with Austin Theory, losing to Theory on the October 11 and October 18 episodes of Raw.

As part of the 2021 Draft in October, Hardy was drafted to the SmackDown brand. He defeated Sami Zayn on the November 12 episode of SmackDown to qualify for Team SmackDown at Survivor Series. The following week he defeated Madcap Moss. At Survivor Series, Hardy took part in the 5-on-5 elimination match on Team SmackDown but was lastly eliminated by Seth Rollins. He then began aiding Drew McIntyre in his feud with Happy Corbin and Madcap Moss with Hardy and McIntyre going on to defeat the duo in tag team action on the November 26 episode of SmackDown, Hardy later appeared in his final WWE televised appearance the following week, helping McIntyre fend off the two during a segment of Happy Talk.

During a house show on December 4, Hardy walked out during a tag team match. The following day, he was sent home during WWE's live tour. This turned out to be his final WWE appearance as Hardy was released from his contract five days later. Subsequent reports revealed that Hardy was originally going to be placed in a storyline in NXT 2.0 with MSK as their "Shaman" but that spot was given to Riddle instead.

=== All Elite Wrestling (2022–2024) ===
In an interview with Jared Myers in February 2022, Hardy confirmed that he planned on signing with All Elite Wrestling (AEW), where his brother Matt has worked since 2020, and would wait until after his 90-day WWE non-compete clause expired to do so. Myers confirmed that Hardy said this in an interview with Post Wrestling. On the March 9 episode of Dynamite, Hardy made his AEW debut, saving his brother Matt from an attack by Team AHFO (Andrade El Idolo, Private Party, and The Butcher and The Blade). On the May 4 episode of Dynamite, Hardy had his first singles match, defeating Bobby Fish to qualify in the Owen Hart Foundation Tournament. On the May 11 episode of Dynamite, Hardy advanced to the tournament's semifinals after defeating Darby Allin. On the May 18 episode of Dynamite, Hardy would be eliminated from the tournament after losing to Adam Cole. After winning a tag team match at the Double or Nothing event, in which he teamed with his brother to wrestle against The Young Bucks, it was revealed that Jeff had sustained a "terrible" concussion-like injury, which left him "almost knocked out" according to Matt.

On June 14, AEW announced that Hardy was indefinitely suspended without pay after being arrested for driving under the influence the day prior. Hardy was scheduled to appear at Triplemanía XXX on June 18, where he and Matt were to face Dragon Lee and Dralístico in the main event. After his arrest, the company Lucha Libre AAA Worldwide announced that he would not participate in the event and would instead be replaced by a surprise wrestler. At the event, Matt teamed with Johnny Hardy.

On April 12, 2023, Jeff made his return, assisting his brother, Isiah Kassidy, and Hook from an assault by The Firm members Lee Moriarty, Ethan Page, and Big Bill. On May 6, 2023, Hardy and his brother Matt alongside Hook and Isiah Kassidy would take on The Firm (Lee Moriatry, Ethan Page, Big Bill and Stokely Hathaway). The Firm would be defeated. Hardy was set to make an appearance with his Willow the Wisp persona, but this idea was scrapped by AEW.

On the February 14, 2024 episode of AEW Rampage, Hardy was defeated by Sammy Guevara in a no disqualification match. During the match, Hardy suffered a broken nose. This would be Hardy's final AEW appearance as on June 14, it was reported that his contract had expired, ending his tenure with the company.

=== Second return to TNA (2024–present) ===
Jeff Hardy made his surprise return to TNA on June 14, 2024, at Against All Odds, coming to the aid of his brother Matt following a post-match attack by Moose and The System. The following night, Jeff reunited with Matt to face Eddie Edwards and Brian Myers for the Impact World Tag Team Championship, with The Hardys winning by disqualification.

On the August 31, 2024 episode of Impact, The Hardys defeated The System in a non-title match. At Victory Road, they defeated First Class, becoming the number one contenders for the tag team titles.

At Bound for Glory on October 26, The Hardy Boyz defeated The System (Myers and Edwards) and Ace Austin & Chris Bey in a three-way Full Metal Mayhem match to win the Impact World Tag Team Championship. At Final Resolution, they successfully defended the titles against The System in a tables match.

At Rebellion, The Hardys lost the titles to Nic and Ryan Nemeth, ending their reign at 183 days. At Slammiversary, they regained the championships in a four-way ladder match also involving the Nemeths, The Rascalz, and Fir$t Cla$$. At Bound for Glory on October 12, Hardys retained the TNA and NXT Tag Team titles against Team 3D (Bully Ray and Devon) in a tables match, where it was a retirement match for Team 3D.

=== Third return to WWE (2025) ===
While still contracted to TNA, the Hardy Boyz made a return appearance with WWE during the February 25, 2025 episode of NXT. At NXT: Roadblock on March 11, The Hardy Boyz successfully defended the TNA World Tag Team Championship against NXT Tag Team Champions Nathan Frazer and Axiom. At NXT vs. TNA Showdown on October 7, the Hardy Boyz won the NXT Tag Team Championship after defeating DarkState's Dion Lennox and Osiris Griffin in a Winners Take All match. At NXT Halloween Havoc on October 25, Lennox and Griffin regained the NXT Tag Team Championships from The Hardy Boyz, who wrestled as The Broken Hardys, in a Broken Rules match.

== Professional wrestling style and persona ==
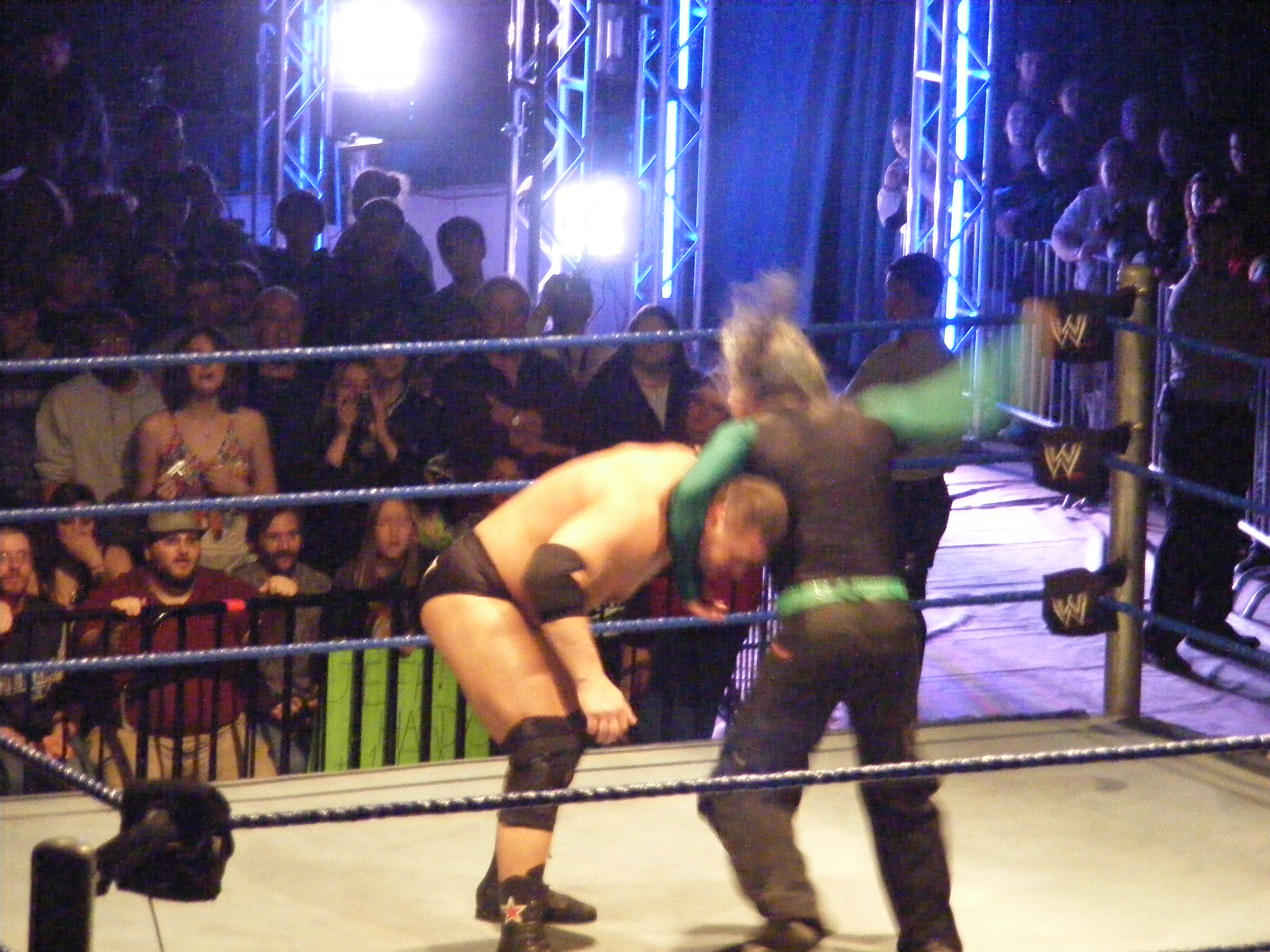
Hardy (right) performing the "Twist of Fate" in 2009

Hardy's professional wrestling style has been described as "high-flying" and "death-defying" with "daredevil stunts". His signature finishing move is the Swanton Bomb. However, by 2018, Hardy used the Swanton Bomb less frequently due to his accumulated lower back injuries. Hardy also used the 450° splash in his early career but stopped after injuring his shoulder, instead using the Swanton Bomb exclusively. Hardy also uses the Twist of Fate, a 3/4 Facelock cutter or a 3/4 facelock stunner. During his time as a heel in 2010, the Twist of Fate was renamed the Twist of Hate. Hardy's other signature moves include Whisper in the Wind (a rolling senton bomb or a corkscrew moonsault); Poetry in Motion; a sitout jawbreaker; and a double leg drop to the midsection of a supine opponent.

Hardy's professional wrestling persona reflects his artistic interests. He is known for his face and body paint which he creates himself before his matches. He credits seeing Sting as a child during a show in North Carolina with inspiring him to create new designs with his face paint each match, saying, "Sting was coming out, this was an old NWA [National Wrestling Alliance] show, and I was able to touch his shoulder. And he had his face painted, his neon green tights on, and the blonde hair - and I was like, 'Oh my gosh, I want to do that. I want to make somebody feel like he made me feel right now'". It is difficult to paint on a canvas while traveling for his work as a wrestler, so he uses his facepaint as a creative outlet. He considers himself shy and introverted when not wearing his painted face, saying, "I can get to the building and have this image in my head. And being that I don't have a canvas I can just use my face as what I want to try to bring to life... All these artistic thoughts come into mind. Like it shows artistic freedom and also freedom of your soul. It's like expression at its best. I think I am more sociable when I'm all painted up. I think I feel normal, quite normal, a lot more normal than when I'm all shy and not painted. That's Jeff Hardy, the Charismatic Enigma at his best, when he comes out with the face paint. The face painted freak, man, that's by far a compliment in my book".

== Other media ==
Hardy appeared on the February 7, 1999, episode of That '70s Show entitled "That Wrestling Show", along with Matt, as an uncredited wrestler. Hardy and Matt also appeared on Tough Enough in early 2001, talking to and wrestling the contestants. He appeared on the February 25, 2002, episode of Fear Factor competing against five other World Wrestling Federation wrestlers. He was eliminated in the first round. His brother eventually won the $50,000 for his charity. Hardy also appears on The Hardy Show, an internet web show which features the Hardys, Shannon Moore and many of their friends. In September 2009, Hardy signed a deal with Fox 21 to appear in a reality television show.

In 2001, Hardy, Matt and Lita appeared in Rolling Stone magazine's 2001 Sports Hall of Fame issue. In 2003, Hardy and Matt, with the help of Michael Krugman, wrote and published their autobiography The Hardy Boyz: Exist 2 Inspire.

According to the Wrestling Figure Checklist, Hardy had 128 different action figures released in the 1990s, 2000s and 2010s.

As part of WWE, Hardy has appeared in several of their DVDs, including The Hardy Boyz: Leap of Faith (2001) and The Ladder Match (2007). He is also featured in the Total Nonstop Action Wrestling release Enigma: The Best of Jeff Hardy (2005) and Pro Wrestling's Ultimate Insiders: Hardy Boys – From the Backyard to the Big Time (2005). On April 29, 2008, WWE released "Twist of Fate: The Matt and Jeff Hardy Story". The DVD features footage of the brothers in OMEGA and WWE, and also briefly mentions Hardy's first run with TNA. In December 2009, WWE released a DVD about Hardy entitled Jeff Hardy: My Life, My Rules. In 2012 Total Nonstop Action released "Enigma: The Best Of Jeff Hardy Volume 2", a followup to the 2005 release featuring a 2 disc long documentary following Hardy's return to TNA, his heel turn, and the Victory Road 2011 incident, and is accompanied by the matches spoken about. In 2015, Total Nonstop Action release "The Best of Jeff Hardy Volume 3: Humanomoly", featuring some of his greatest matches throughout his TNA tenure.

== Video games ==
WWF/E Video games
Year	Title	Notes
1999	WWF WrestleMania 2000	Video game debut
2000	WWF SmackDown!	
2000	WWF Royal Rumble	
2000	WWF No Mercy	
2000	WWF SmackDown! 2: Know Your Role	
2001	WWF With Authority!	
2001	WWF Road to WrestleMania	
2001	WWF SmackDown! Just Bring It	
2002	WWF Raw	Cover athlete
2002	WWE WrestleMania X8	
2002	WWE SmackDown! Shut Your Mouth	
2003	WWE Crush Hour	
2007	WWE SmackDown vs. Raw 2008	
2008	WWE SmackDown vs. Raw 2009	
2009	WWE Legends of WrestleMania	Importable character
2009	WWE SmackDown vs. Raw 2010	
2014	WWE SuperCard	
2015	WWE Champions	
2017	WWE 2K18	Downloadable content
2018	WWE 2K19	
2019	WWE 2K20	
2020	WWE 2K Battlegrounds	
2022	WWE 2K22	
2026	WWE 2K26	Ringside Pass: Season 4

AEW Video games
Year	Title	Notes
2023	AEW Fight Forever	AEW video game debut

== Artistic and musical pursuits ==
Hardy has an eclectic set of interests outside of wrestling which includes songwriting, poetry and creating art. He calls his artistic side "The Imag-I-Nation". He has created three-dimensional artworks such as a 30-foot (9.1 m) statue of an "aluminummy" named "Neroameee" out of tin foil outside of his recording studio (a spray painted trailer), an artificial volcano in his front yard, which he then jumped over on his motocross dirtbike and a large sculpture of his brother Matt's hand signal "V1", which was seen on The Hardy Show, an online webshow which featured both the Hardys, Shannon Moore, and many of their friends. He has sold his original paintings online and has donated his artwork to numerous charity auctions. He also designs the art sold on numerous merchandise throughout his career including the album artwork for his musical pursuits.

In 2003, Hardy formed a band, PeroxWhy?Gen, with members of the band Burnside 6 and Moore, who later left. He also converted a trailer into a recording studio and taught himself how to play guitar and later purchased a drum set. Jeff Hardy, came upon the name 'Peroxwhy?gen' while looking at an aerosol can. He combined the words, peroxide and oxygen then added 'why?' creating the name, 'Peroxwhy?gen'. Their first album (marketed as a Jeff Hardy solo album) Plurality of Worlds was released through TNA Music on November 7, 2013. Peroxwhy?Gen released their second album Within the Cygnus Rift on July 27, 2015. Their third album, Precession of the Equinoxes, was released in 2017. He performs his music at venues while traveling for his wrestling career, sometimes just hours after a match. His music features rock and pop songs, tend to be autobiographical and Hardy prefers performing his slower songs live.

=== Discography ===
==== Studio albums ====
- Plurality of Worlds (2013)
- Within the Cygnus Rift (2015)
- Precession of the Equinoxes (2017)

==== Extended plays ====
- Similar Creatures (2012)
- Spawn of Me (2016)
- Individuals (2019)
- Human Forms (2020)
- The Omega Sessions (2022)
- The Omega Sessions: II (2024)

==== Singles ====
- Vaccine (2020)

== Personal life ==
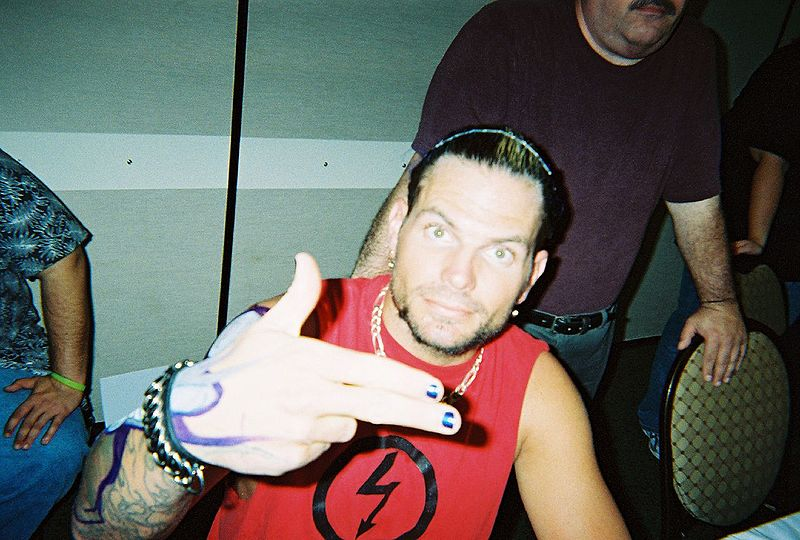
Hardy at an autograph signing, showing his roots tattoo on his arm

Hardy met his girlfriend Beth Britt in 1999, shortly after the Hardy Boyz won the WWF Tag Team Championship for the first time. The couple met at a club in Southern Pines, North Carolina. On March 15, 2008, it was reported that Hardy's home burned to the ground in a fire. Hardy and his girlfriend Beth were not home at the time, but his dog, Jack was killed in the fire. In August 2010, Hardy announced that Britt was pregnant with the couple's first child, a daughter named Ruby Claire Hardy, who was born on October 20, 2010. Hardy and Britt got married on March 9, 2011. The pair's second child, a daughter, Nera Quinn Hardy, was born on December 31, 2015. Hardy has a tattoo of roots that starts on his head, behind his ear, and finishes at his hand. He also has a few other signature designed tattoos, one of which, a dragon, he hid from his father at a young age. It was also the first tattoo he got in 1998. He later got tattoos of the Chinese symbols for "Peace" and "Health", as well as tattoos of fire and a wave. On March 14, 2020, Hardy revealed a new tattoo on his back. Hardy regards his tattoos as his "artistic impulses".

=== Legal issues ===
On September 11, 2009, Hardy was arrested on charges of drug trafficking in controlled prescription pills and possession of anabolic steroids, after a search of his house yielded 262 Vicodin prescription pills, 180 Soma prescription pills, 555 milliliters of anabolic steroids, a residual amount of powder cocaine, and drug paraphernalia. On September 8, 2011, Hardy was sentenced to ten days in jail, 30 months of probation, and a fine of $100,000. Hardy served his jail sentence from October 3 to 14, 2011.

On March 10, 2018, Hardy was arrested and charged in Concord, North Carolina, for driving while impaired. Hardy allegedly hit 105 feet of guardrail before spinning out. Police reported Hardy caused $8,000 of damage to his car, and an additional $5,000 to the guardrail.

On July 14, 2019, Hardy was arrested in Myrtle Beach, South Carolina, for public intoxication. Police arrived at the scene shortly after 11 a.m. after receiving reports of an intoxicated person. Hardy was released later that day after paying a bond of $153. On October 3 of the same year, Hardy was arrested and charged with driving while impaired in Moore County, North Carolina.

On June 14, 2022, Hardy was arrested by Florida Highway Patrol officers in Volusia County, Florida, on charges of driving with a suspended license, violating restrictions placed on his license which required him to keep an Ignition Interlock Device — a handheld breathalyzer that prevents users from starting their vehicle after drinking alcohol — in his car, and felony DUI. According to Florida highway patrol officers, they observed a white vehicle "swerving" and "running off the road" at approximately 12:30 p.m. eastern time. They stated that once they got Hardy to pull over and they approached, he seemed confused, belligerent, and smelled of alcohol. The arrest report states that Hardy could not complete any portion of the field sobriety tests the officers had him do, and that he blew a blood alcohol level of 0.291, well above Florida's legal limit of 0.08. In a press release sent out on June 14, AEW president Tony Khan announced that Hardy was indefinitely suspended without pay, and that he would only be invited back to AEW on the condition he would complete alcohol rehabilitation treatment and "maintain his sobriety". Hardy submitted a plea of nolo contendere to charges of DUI, driving under a suspended/canceled/revoked license, and driving while his license was restricted. As a result, Hardy was sentenced to the following in February 2023: a 38-day jail sentence (which Hardy had already served), two years of probation, $4,500 in court fees, a 10-year suspension on his driver's license, two years with an ignition interlock device, a 90-day vehicle impoundment, a court-mandated school or DUI program, and community service.

== Championships and accomplishments ==
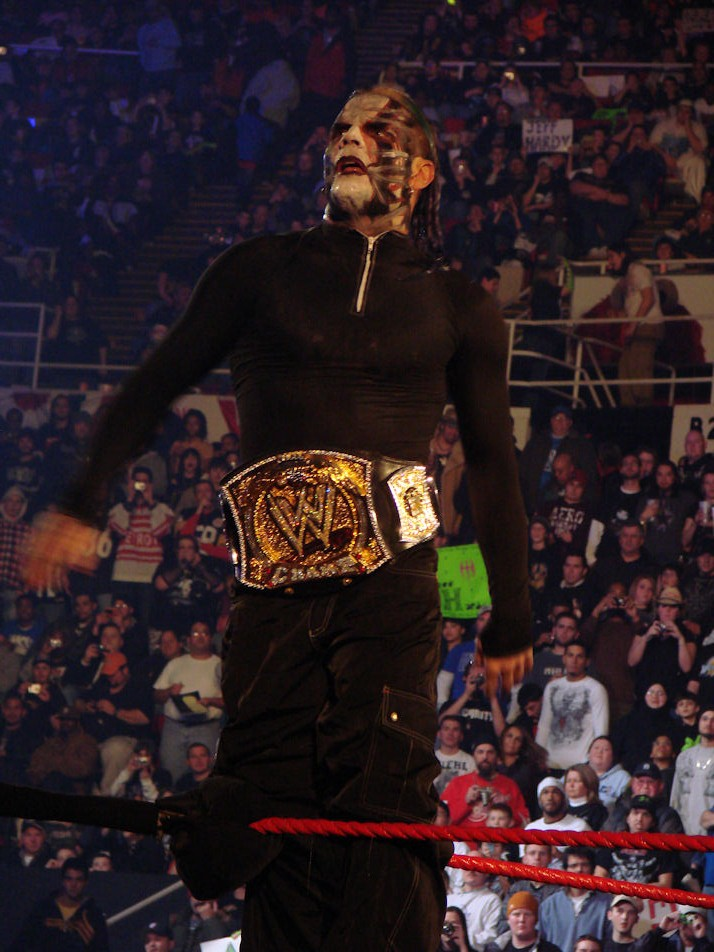
Hardy is a former WWE Champion, and an overall three-time World Champion in WWE.

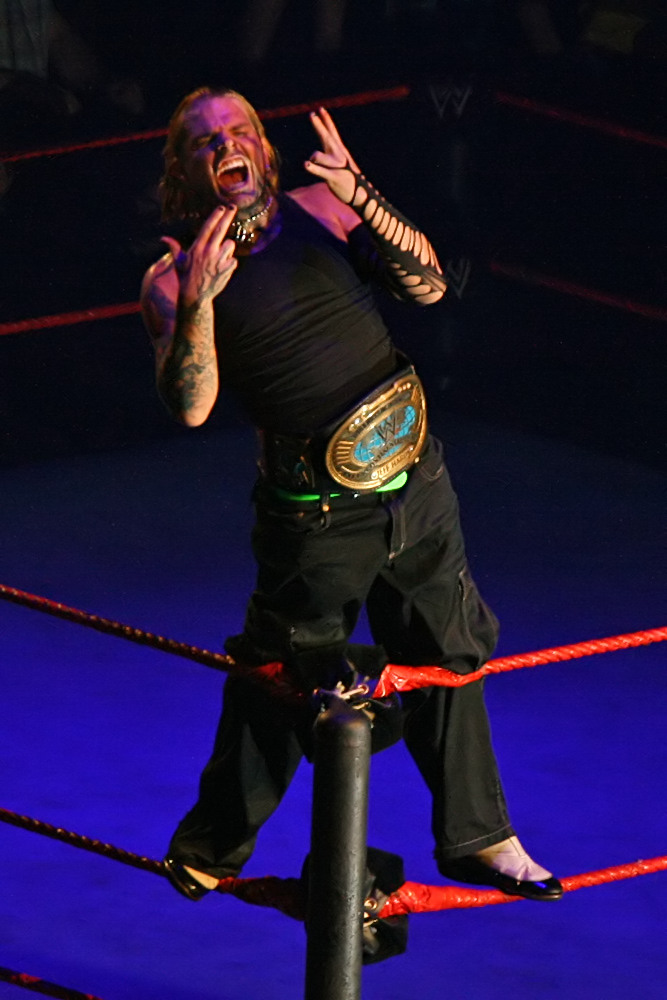
A five-time WWF/WWE Intercontinental Champion, Hardy is the youngest person to win the title, at age 23.

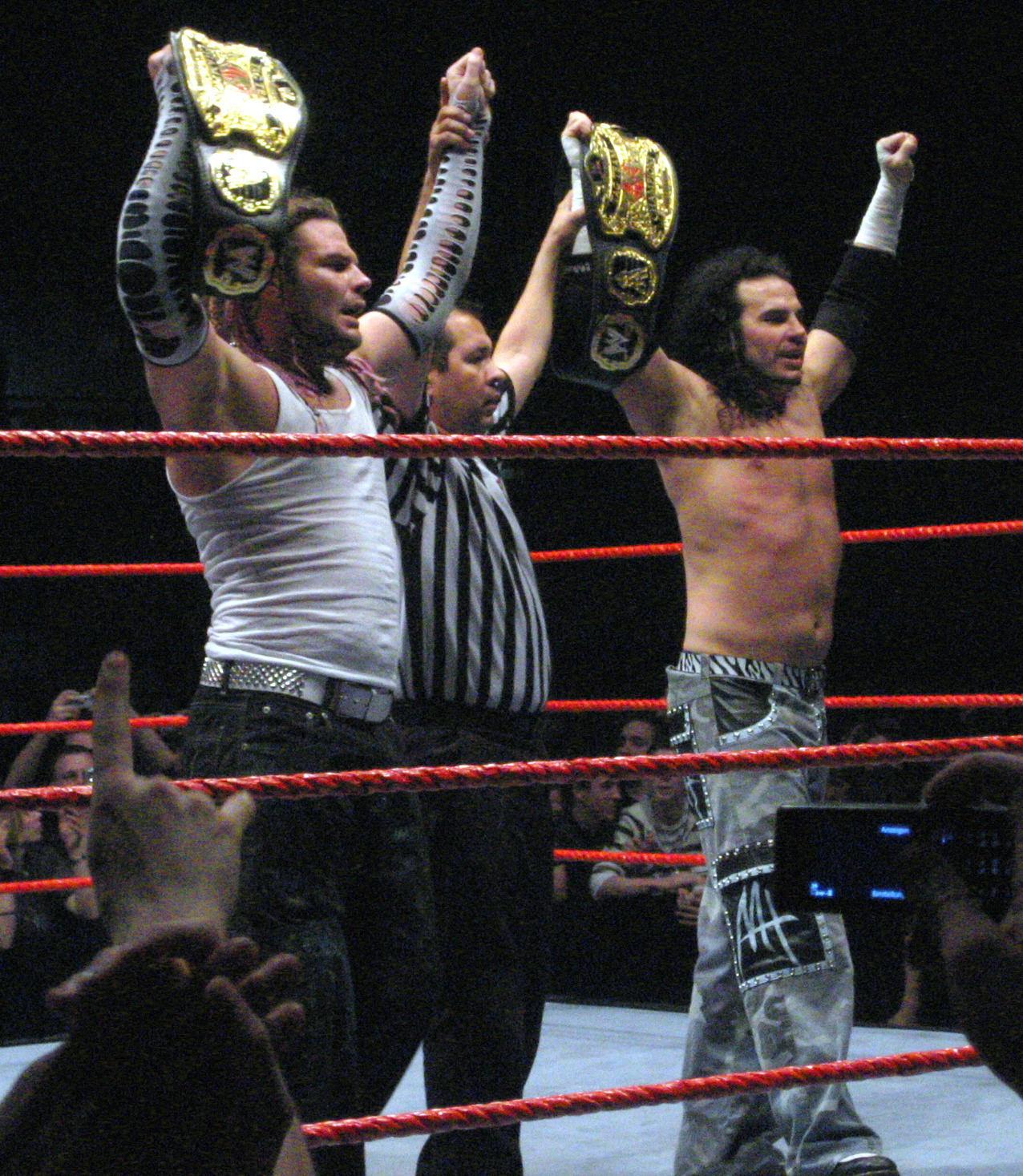
Hardy is an overall nine-time Tag Team Champion in WWE with his brother Matt Hardy, including six WWF/World Tag Team Championships

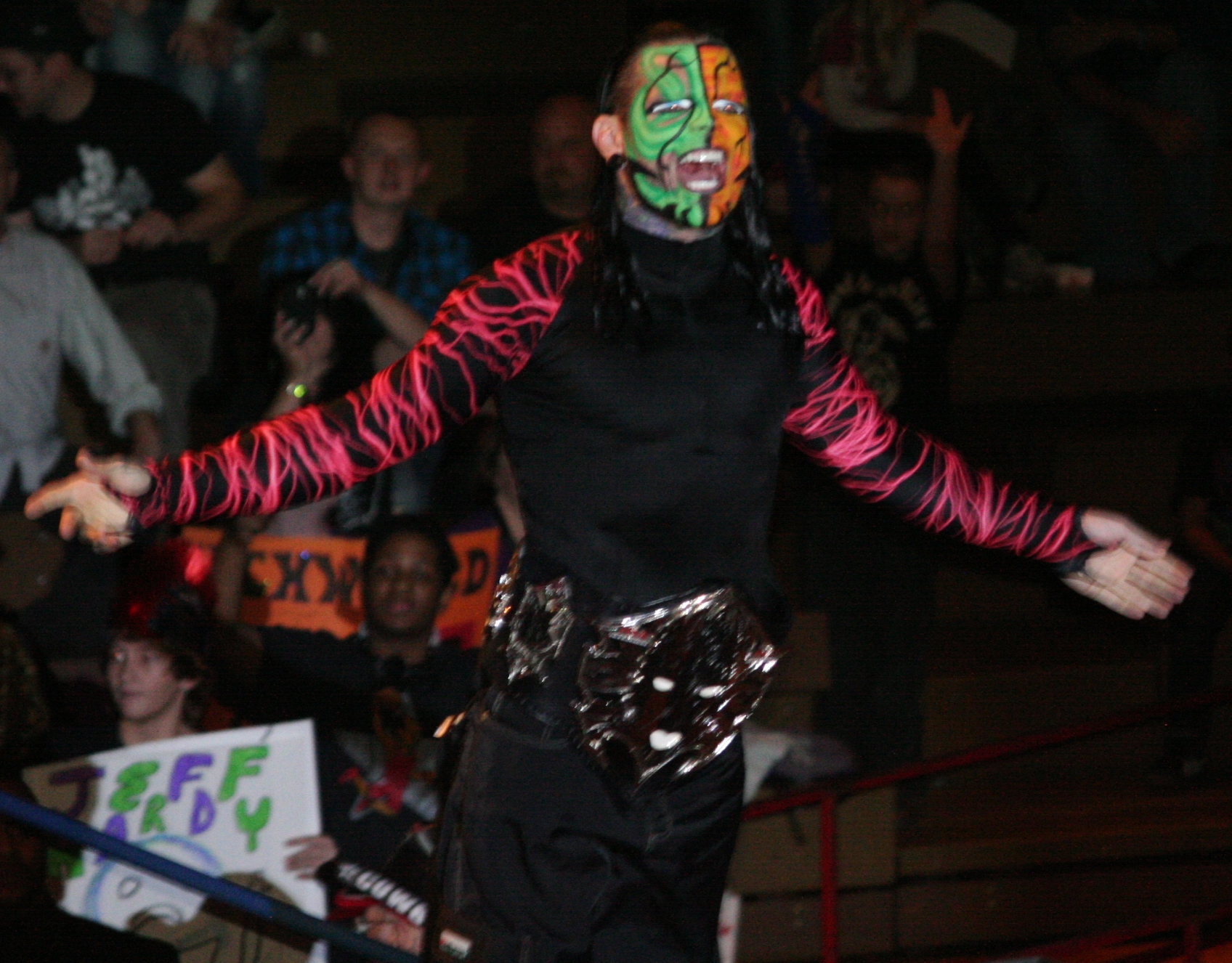
Hardy is a three-time TNA World Heavyweight Champion, and during his reigns he had his own custom title belt (as shown here)

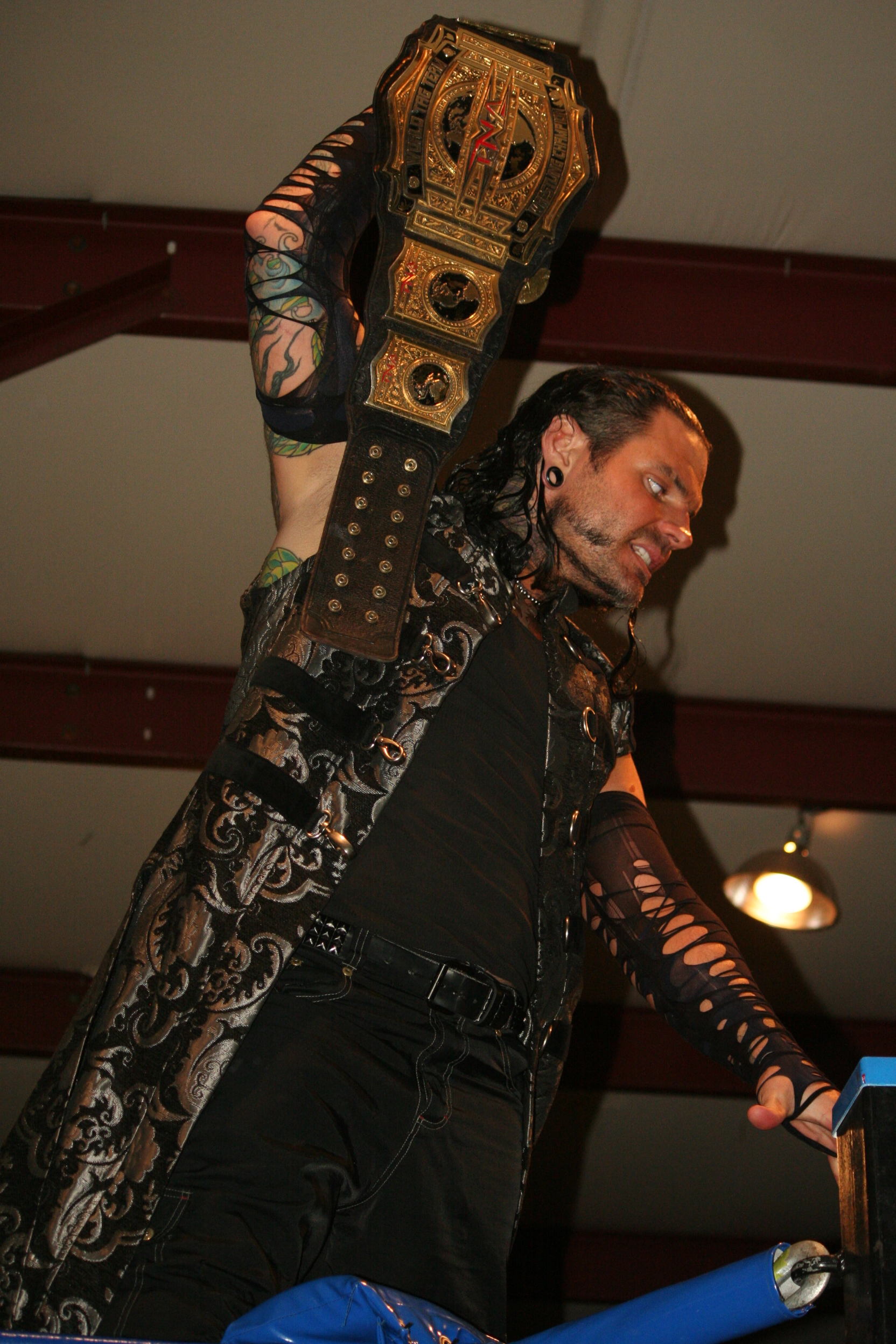
Hardy is also a five-time TNA World Tag Team Champion (held with his brother Matt)

- 4th Rope Wrestling
  - 4th Rope Tag Team Championship (1 time, inaugural) – with Matt Hardy
- All Star Wrestling (West Virginia)
  - ASW Tag Team Championship (1 time) – with Broken Matt
- The Baltimore Sun
  - Feud of the Year (2009) vs. CM Punk
- The Crash
  - The Crash Tag Team Championship (1 time) – with Broken Matt
- House of Glory
  - HOG Tag Team Championship (2 times, current) – with Matt Hardy
- International Wrestling Cartel
  - IWC Tag Team Championship (1 time) – with Matt Hardy
- MCW Pro Wrestling
  - MCW Tag Team Championship (1 time) – with Matt Hardy
- National Championship Wrestling
  - NCW Light Heavyweight Championship (4 times)
- New Dimension Wrestling
  - NDW Light Heavyweight Championship (1 time)
  - NDW Tag Team Championship (1 time) – with Matt Hardy
- New Frontier Wrestling Association
  - NFWA Heavyweight Championship (1 time)
- North East Wrestling
  - NEW Junior Heavyweight Championship (1 time)
- NWA 2000
  - NWA 2000 Tag Team Championship (1 time) – with Matt Hardy
- OMEGA Championship Wrestling
  - OMEGA Heavyweight Championship (1 time)
  - OMEGA New Frontiers Championship (1 time)
  - OMEGA Tag Team Championship (2 times) – with Broken Matt/Matt Hardy
  - OMEGA Heavyweight Championship Tournament (2015)
- Pro Wrestling Illustrated
  - Comeback of the Year (2007, 2012, 2017)
  - Match of the Year (2000) with Matt Hardy vs. The Dudley Boyz and Edge and Christian in a triangle Ladder match at WrestleMania 2000
  - Match of the Year (2001) with Matt Hardy vs. The Dudley Boyz and Edge and Christian in a Tables, Ladders and Chairs match at WrestleMania X-Seven
  - Most Popular Wrestler of the Year (2008, 2009)
  - Tag Team of the Year (2000, 2025) with Matt Hardy
  - Ranked No. 7 of the top 500 singles wrestlers in the PWI 500 in 2013
  - Ranked No. 418 of the top 500 greatest wrestlers in the PWI Years in 2003
- Ring of Honor
  - ROH World Tag Team Championship (1 time) – with Matt Hardy
  - Holy S*** Moment of the Decade (2010s) – Hardys Show Up, Win ROH World Tag Team Gold – with Matt Hardy
- Total Nonstop Action Wrestling
  - TNA World Heavyweight Championship (3 times)
  - TNA World Tag Team Championship (5 times) – with Matt Hardy/Broken Matt
  - NWA World Heavyweight Championship #1 Contender Tournament (2004)
  - TNA World Heavyweight Championship Tournament (2010)
  - TNA World Tag Team Championship #1 Contender Tournament (2014) – with Matt Hardy
  - TNA World Tag Team Championship Tournament (2015) – with Matt Hardy
  - Bound for Glory Series (2012)
  - Race for the Case (2017 – Green Case)
  - TNA World Cup (2015) – with Gunner, Davey Richards, Rockstar Spud, Crazzy Steve and Gail Kim
  - TNA World Cup (2016) – with Eddie Edwards, Jessie Godderz, Robbie E and Jade
  - TNA Wrestler of the Year (2012)
- Universal Wrestling Association
  - UWA World Middleweight Championship (1 time)
- World Wrestling Federation/World Wrestling Entertainment/WWE
  - WWE Championship (1 time)
  - World Heavyweight Championship (2 times)
  - WWF/E Intercontinental Championship (5 times)
  - WWE United States Championship (1 time)
  - WWE European Championship (1 time)
  - WWF/E Hardcore Championship (3 times)
  - WWF Light Heavyweight Championship (1 time)
  - WWE Raw Tag Team Championship (1 time) – with Matt Hardy
  - WWE SmackDown Tag Team Championship (1 time) – with Matt Hardy
  - WWF/E World Tag Team Championship (6 times) – with Matt Hardy
  - WCW Tag Team Championship (1 time) – with Matt Hardy
  - NXT Tag Team Championship (1 time) – with Matt Hardy
  - 18th Triple Crown Champion
  - Ninth Grand Slam Champion (under original format; Ninth overall)
  - Fourth Tag Team Triple Crown Champion – with Matt Hardy
  - Terri Invitational Tournament (1999) – with Matt Hardy
  - Brisbane Cup (2007)
  - Slammy Award (2 times)
    - Extreme Moment of the Year (2008) giving Randy Orton a Swanton Bomb from the top of the Raw set
    - Extreme Moment of the Year (2009) jumping from a ladder onto CM Punk through the Spanish announce table at SummerSlam
- Wrestling Observer Newsletter
  - Best Flying Wrestler (2000)
  - Feud of the Year (2009) vs. CM Punk
  - Most Disgusting Promotional Tactic (2008) WWE teasing a drug overdose to remove him from a Survivor Series title match
  - Worst Worked Match of the Year (2011) vs. Sting at Victory Road (owing to Hardy's inebriation)
- Wrestling Superstar
  - Wrestling Superstar Tag Team Championship (1 time) – with Matt Hardy
