= OMEGA Championship Wrestling =

Professional wrestling promotion

- Acronym: OMEGA/OCW
- Founded: 1997
- Headquarters: Cameron, North Carolina, United States
- Founder: The Hardy Boyz
- Owner(s): Gregory Helms; Matt Hardy

The Organization of Modern Extreme Grappling Arts, also known as OMEGA or OMEGA Championship Wrestling (stylized as ΩMΞGΔ CHΔMPIΩNSHIP WRΞSTLIΠG), is an independent professional wrestling promotion based in central North Carolina, United States.

It featured and helped launch the careers of both Hardys, Shannon Moore, Joey Matthews, Christian York, Joey Abs, C. W. Anderson, Shane Helms, and others. The promotion has been inactive since 2017.

== History ==
Established in 1997, OMEGA was run and created by Matt and Jeff Hardy. They began the promotion because at the time, there were not many places to wrestle, nor did they know anyone who could help. Both Matt and Jeff Hardy took apart the ring and put it back together at every event they had, while Matt Hardy sewed all the costumes worn in OMEGA.

=== Closure ===
The promotion folded in October 1999, after both Matt and Jeff Hardy had signed with the World Wrestling Federation, leaving the other wrestlers to make careers for themselves, with many moving onto NWA Wildside.

In 2007, Highspots.com produced a two-disc DVD set entitled OMEGA: Uncommon Passion, chronicling the history of the promotion, including matches and interviews with many OMEGA wrestlers.

=== Revival ===
Matt Hardy had announced that OMEGA would return in January 2013 with an event titled "Chinlock For Chuck" a fundraising event for former wrestler Chuck Coates (MADD Max) who at the time was suffering from Non-Hodgkin Lymphoma. The main event featured Matt Hardy, Jeff Hardy, Shane "Hurricane" Helms and "Cowboy" James Storm defeating Gunner, Steve Corino, CW Anderson and Lodi. On October 12, 2013 at "Chapel Thrill", Hardy announced a Tournament for the OMEGA Heavyweight Championship which featured Matt Hardy vs. CW Anderson and Shane "Hurricane" Helms vs. "The King" Shane Williams. After Hardy's qualifying match he was attacked by CW but was saved by the returning Willow the Whisp. Hardy won that match and now advanced to the finals. In their April event "Chaos in Cameron" The Hardy Boyz defeated The Briscoe Brothers in the main event.

On February 28, 2015, OMEGA held an event called Night of a Champion, featuring the finals of the OMEGA Heavyweight Championship tournament. Jeff Hardy (replacing an injured Shane Helms) defeated his brother, Matt Hardy, to become the first OMEGA Champion since 2000.

On August 14, 2015, OMEGA announced a partnership with Global Force Wrestling (GFW). On January 25, 2017, OMEGA announced it would crown its first tag team champions since 1999.

== Championships ==
=== Active championships ===
Championship	Current champion(s)	Previous champion(s)	Date won	Location
OMEGA Heavyweight Championship	Matt Hardy	Trevor Lee	November 21, 2015	Smithfield, North Carolina
OMEGA Tag Team Championship	The Broken Hardys (Broken Matt & Brother Nero)	N/A	January 29, 2017	Gibsonville, North Carolina

=== Defunct championships ===
Championship	Final champion(s)	Previous champion(s)	Date won	Location
OMEGA New Frontiers Championship	Cham Pain	Kid Dynamo	January 29, 1999	Wendell, North Carolina
OMEGA Light Heavyweight Championship	Joey Matthews	Christian York	January 29, 1999	Wendell, North Carolina

== Roster ==
=== Male wrestlers ===
- Andrew Everett
- Caleb Konley
- Jeff Hardy
- John Skyler
- Matt Hardy
- Matt Sydal
- Matt Riviera
- Ricky Morton
- Robert Gibson
- Scott Steiner
- Shane Helms
- Trevor Lee

=== Female wrestlers ===
- Amber O'Neal
- Reby Sky
- Mia Svensson
- Kacee Carlisle
- Jayme Jameson

=== Notable alumni ===
- Cham Pain
- Rambunctious
- Christian York
- Joey Matthews
- Kid Dynamo
- Krazy K
- Lita
- The Dupps
- Mike Maverick
- Otto Schwanz
- Rick Michaels
- Venom
- Caprice Coleman
- Steve Corino
