= Marty Garner =

American professional wrestler

Personal information
- Born: May 2, 1967 (age 59) North Carolina, U.S.

Professional wrestling career
- Ring name(s): Marty Garner; Cham Pain; Puck Dupp; The Ragin' Cajun
- Billed height: 5 ft 11 in (1.80 m)
- Billed weight: 188 lb (85 kg)
- Debut: 1993

Marty Garner (born May 2, 1967) is an American professional wrestler most noted for his appearances in World Wrestling Federation/Entertainment and his time in Extreme Championship Wrestling.

== Professional wrestling career ==
=== Early career (1993–1995) ===
Garner started wrestling in several independent wrestling promotions based in North Carolina, mainly wrestling under the ring name Cham Pain in Southern Championship Wrestling, New Dimension Wrestling and OMEGA.

=== World Wrestling Federation (1994–1997) ===
Garner has made numerous appearances for the WWF as an enhancement talent, beginning in May 1994 against Jeff Jarrett. He then made several appearances in 1995, 1996 and 1997 against wrestlers such as Hunter Hearst Helmsley, Jerry Lawler, Jim Neidhart, Yoshihiro Tajiri, and Marc Mero.

==== Pedigree incident (1996) ====
On May 28, 1996, Garner faced Hunter Hearst Helmsley (Triple H) during the taping of WWF Superstars. During the match, Helmsley went for his finisher, the Pedigree. It is reported that Garner, who had not taken the move before and assumed it was either a double underhook powerbomb or suplex, gave much more jump into the move and attempted to flip out of it while Helmsley went through the move as usual. This resulted in a very violent version of the move in which Garner landed directly on top of his head and suffered neck damage. This incident was captured on video and circulated throughout the Internet. Despite the move being botched it was still broadcast on Superstars show, and even featured as the WWF's Slam of the Week.

Following this, Garner appeared on several daytime talk shows including Sally Jessy Raphael, Jenny Jones and, most notably, on Montel Williams in an episode about former "geeks" reuniting with past tormentors. Discussing the incident on the show, a clip of Garner's match against Helmsley, including the botched Pedigree, was also shown.

=== OMEGA Championship Wrestling and other promotions (1997–2000) ===
After jobbing in the WWF, Garner worked in independent promotions in North Carolina. His most successful was OMEGA Championship Wrestling as Cham-Pain founded in 1997 by his good friends The Hardy Boyz. He became the OMEGA New Frontiers Champion defeating Kid Dynamo on January 29, 1999. Also in July 1999, Cham-Pain won the OMEGA Heavyweight Championship defeating Venom. OMEGA folded in October 1999 making him the very last OMEGA New Frontiers Champion. Cham-Pain carried the OMEGA Heavyweight Championship retaining the title in other promotions. He dropped the title to Steve Corino at an OMEGA reunion show on December 1, 2000.

=== Extreme Championship Wrestling (1999–2000) ===
Garner began appearing in ECW in 1999 as the Ragin' Cajun, managing Rod Price. He soon changed his name to Puck Dupp, a member of the Dupp Family, in a hillbilly gimmick.

=== World Championship Wrestling appearance (2000) ===
On September 14, 2000, Garner made an appearance for World Championship Wrestling teaming with Toad losing to SGT. AWOL and Cpl. Cajun.

=== Independent Circuit (2000-2003) ===
After managing the Dupps and losing the OMEGA Heavyweight Title, Garner continued working in North Carolina promotions most notably Carolina Wrestling Federation Mid-Atlantic. He would retire from wrestling in 2003.

=== Return to WWE (2006–2008) ===
Garner returned in the now renamed WWE again for two appearances in 2006, wrestling in a tag team match against Kid Kash and Jamie Noble on SmackDown! and then facing the debuting Montel Vontavious Porter at the No Mercy pay-per-view. He appeared at a Raw house show on November 26, 2007 against Vladimir Kozlov and faced Kozlov again on the April 25, 2008 airing of SmackDown.

=== Return to Wrestling (2019-present) ===
Garner would come out of retirement in 2019 after 11 years. He continued working in North Carolina in promotions such as Alternative Championship Wrestling and Tarheel Championship wrestling.

== Championships and accomplishments ==
- Memphis Championship Wrestling
  - MCW Southern Tag Team Championship (2 times) - with Bo Dupp and Jack Dupp
- National Championship Wrestling
  - NCW Television Championship (1 time)
- Organization of Modern Extreme Grappling Arts
  - OMEGA Heavyweight Championship (1 time)
  - OMEGA New Frontiers Championship (1 time, final)
- Pro Wrestling Illustrated
  - PWI ranked him # 269 of the 500 best singles wrestlers of the PWI 500 in 2001
- Southern Championship Wrestling
  - SCW Heavyweight Championship (3 times)

== Filmography ==
- Walking Tall (assistant: The Rock)
