= OMEGA New Frontiers Championship =

Professional wrestling championship

Details
- Promotion: Organization of Modern Extreme Grappling Arts
- Date established: August 2, 1997
- Date retired: October 1999
Statistics
- First champion(s): Willow of the Whisp
- Final champion(s): Cham-Pain
- Most reigns: All titleholders (1 reign)
- Longest reign: Willow of the Whisp (356 days)
- Shortest reign: Kid Dynamo (189 days)
- Oldest champion: Cham-Pain (31 years, 272 days)
- Youngest champion: Kid Dynamo (18 years, 362 days)

The OMEGA New Frontiers Championship was a secondary title in the Organization of Modern Extreme Grappling Arts (OMEGA) independent professional wrestling promotion. The title lasted from 1997 to 1999.

== Title history ==
No.	Order in reign history
Reign	The reign number for the specific set of wrestlers listed
Event	The event in which the title was won
—	Used for vacated reigns so as not to count it as an official reign
N/A	The information is not available or is unknown

No.	Wrestler	Reign	Date	Days held	Location	Event	Notes	Ref...
1	Willow of the Whisp	1	August 2, 1997	356	Southern Pines, NC	OMEGA	Defeated Venom to become inaugural champion.	
2	Kid Dynamo	1	July 24, 1998	189	Sanford, NC	OMEGA		
3	Cham-Pain	1	January 29, 1999	245 – 275	Wendell, NC	OMEGA		
—	Retired	—	October 1999	—	N/A	N/A	Title retired when the promotion closed.	

== See also ==
- OMEGA Championship Wrestling
