= WWF Backlash (2000) =

World Wrestling Federation pay-per-view event

Backlash
- Promotional poster featuring Chris Jericho
- Promotion: World Wrestling Federation
- Date: April 30, 2000
- City: Washington, D.C.
- Venue: MCI Center
- Attendance: 19,101
- Buy rate: 650,000

Pay-per-view chronology
← Previous; WrestleMania 2000	Next → Insurrextion

Backlash chronology
← Previous; 1999	Next → 2001

The 2000 Backlash was a professional wrestling pay-per-view (PPV) event produced by the World Wrestling Federation (WWF, now WWE). It was the second annual Backlash and took place on April 30, 2000, at the MCI Center in Washington, D.C. The concept of the event was based around the backlash from WrestleMania 2000.

Nine professional wrestling matches were scheduled on the event's card. The main event was a singles match for the WWF Championship with Shane McMahon as special guest referee, in which The Rock, aided by the returning "Stone Cold" Steve Austin, defeated Triple H to win the championship. Featured matches on the undercard included Chris Benoit defeating Chris Jericho by disqualification to retain the WWF Intercontinental Championship and a six-man Hardcore match for the WWF Hardcore Championship, which Crash Holly won to retain the championship.

== Production ==
=== Background ===
In 1999, the World Wrestling Federation (WWF, now WWE) held a professional wrestling pay-per-view (PPV) event entitled Backlash as the post-WrestleMania XV event. The first show was originally titled "Backlash: In Your House", but the promotion discontinued the "In Your House" series of events to establish monthly PPVs in which Backlash was the first. The concept of the pay-per-view was based around the backlash from WWF's flagship event, WrestleMania. A second Backlash event was scheduled for April 30, 2000, at the MCI Center in Washington, D.C., and featured the backlash from WrestleMania 2000. This in turn established Backlash as an annual PPV for the WWF.

=== Storylines ===
The event featured nine professional wrestling matches that involved different wrestlers from pre-existing scripted feuds and storylines. Wrestlers were portrayed as either heels or faces as they followed a series of events which built tension, culminating in a wrestling match or series of matches.

After Vince McMahon betrayed The Rock at WrestleMania, Vince joined forces with Triple H, Stephanie McMahon-Helmsley, Shane McMahon, and D-Generation X to fully complete the formation of the heel faction, the McMahon-Helmsley Regime. The Regime's new objectives primarily revolved around keeping Triple H as WWF Champion through dirty tactics of interfering in matches, and ambushing dissenters at inopportune times. On the April 10, 2000 episode of Raw Is War, The Rock won the right to face Triple H for the WWF Championship at Backlash, but the Regime made stipulations to the title match that would give Triple H a full advantage: Vince and Stephanie would be allowed to be ringside for the match, and Shane was named the referee for the match.

In addition to The Rock, another noted figure who opposed the Regime was referee Earl Hebner, who started to feud with Triple H, culminating on the April 17 episode of Raw is War, where Triple H defended his WWF Championship against Chris Jericho. During the match, Hebner came to relieve the original referee, who had gotten knocked out, which caused Triple H to argue with Hebner. The distraction allowed Jericho to take advantage and pin Triple H to win the title, though Hebner visibly called a fast pinfall. The Regime then brought Hebner and the original referee Mike Chioda to the ring, where Chioda admitted that Hebner had made an unfair pinfall. Triple H then forced Hebner to reverse the decision, allowing Triple H to regain the title, subsequently firing him in the process. Later that night, WWF CEO Linda McMahon, the only member of the McMahon family to not be a member of the Regime, arrived to the arena and announced that she declared The Rock to be "outnumbered" at Backlash, and decided that she would allow one WWF wrestler to be in The Rock's corner at Backlash: "Stone Cold" Steve Austin, who had not been seen in the WWF since the previous year's Survivor Series. At the end of the final episode of SmackDown! prior to Backlash, Austin made his first WWF appearance in 6 months, where he dropped a concrete barrier from a crane onto the "DX Express" bus, which the Regime used for transport, causing it to explode, as a warning to the Regime.

== Event ==
Other on-screen personnel
Role:	Name:
English commentators	Jim Ross
English commentators	Jerry Lawler
Spanish commentators	Carlos Cabrera
Spanish commentators	Hugo Savinovich
Interviewers	Jonathan Coachman
Interviewers	Michael Cole
Ring announcer	Lilian Garcia
Referees	Mike Chioda
Referees	Earl Hebner
Referees	Jim Korderas
Referees	Jack Doan
Referees	Tim White
Referees	Theodore Long
Referees	Chad Patton

=== Preliminary matches ===
The event opened with Edge and Christian defending the WWF Tag Team Championship against D-Generation X (X-Pac and Road Dogg). X-Pac performed an X-Factor on Edge but the referee was distracted, allowing Christian to attack X-Pac with the ring bell. Christian pinned X-Pac to retain the titles.

Dean Malenko defended the WWF Light Heavyweight Championship against Scotty 2 Hotty. The finish of the match saw Scotty attempt a Superplex on Malenko, who countered into a Super DDT on Scotty to retain the title.

The APA (Faarooq and Bradshaw) faced The Big Boss Man and Bull Buchanan. Boss Man attacked Bradshaw with a nightstick and Buchanan performed a Diving Scissors Kick on Bradshaw to win the match.

Crash Holly defended the WWF Hardcore Championship against Matt Hardy, Jeff Hardy, Hardcore Holly, Perry Saturn, and Tazz. Tazz applied the Tazzmission on Hardcore Holly but Saturn hit Tazz with a Stop sign to break the hold. After Matt and Jeff dove onto Saturn and Hardcore Holly, Crash pinned Tazz to retain the title.

The Big Show, impersonating Hulk Hogan as "The Showster", faced Kurt Angle. Big Show performed a Chokeslam on Angle to win the match.

The Dudley Boyz (Bubba Ray Dudley and D-Von Dudley) faced T & A (Test and Albert). Trish Stratus distracted Bubba, allowing Test to perform a Big Boot on Bubba to win the match. After the match, Bubba put Trish through a table.

Eddie Guerrero defended the WWF European Championship against Essa Rios. Guerrero performed a Spinning Crucifix Toss dropped into a Neckbreaker on Rios to retain the title.

In the semi-main event, Chris Benoit defended the WWF Intercontinental Championship against Chris Jericho. Benoit applied the Crippler Crossface on Jericho but Jericho countered the hold into the Walls of Jericho, with Benoit grabbing the ropes to force Jericho to break the hold. After the referee was incapacitated, Benoit hit Jericho with the title belt for a near-fall. Benoit attempted a Diving Headbutt on Jericho but Jericho countered by attacking Benoit with the title belt after the referee recovered, meaning Benoit won by disqualification and retained the title. Upset by the decision, Jericho put referee Tim White in the Walls of Jericho after the match.

=== Main event ===
In the main event, Triple H defended the WWF Championship against The Rock with Shane McMahon as the special guest referee. Prior to the match, Vince McMahon announced to the crowd that he'd made sure that "Stone Cold" Steve Austin wasn't going to be allowed into the arena for the match. During the match, Vince hit The Rock with the title belt, and Triple H pinned The Rock for a near-fall. After Shane refused to count out Triple H, The Rock performed a double Rock Bottom through an announce table on Triple H and Shane. Triple H then performed a Pedigree on The Rock whilst Pat Patterson and Gerald Brisco appeared to officiate the match. Triple H pinned The Rock for a near-fall. Vince hit The Rock with a chair and told Patterson and Brisco to make a fast count. Austin then surprisingly appeared and hit Triple H, Patterson, Brisco, Shane, and Vince with a chair. Linda McMahon appeared with Earl Hebner. When Stephanie confronted Linda, she promptly shoved Stephanie to the floor, and ordered Hebner to officiate the remainder of the match. The Rock performed a Spinebuster and a People's Elbow on Triple H to win the title.

After the match, as The Rock celebrated, Austin returned to the ring, driving his truck and towing the burned-out wreck of the "DX Express" bus behind it, and joined The Rock in celebration with a couple of beers.

== Reception ==
Backlash 2000 received 675,000 buys, up from 398,000 received by Backlash 1999. The event has been praised and cited by many as the best post-WrestleMania pay-per-view of all time and one of the best secondary pay-per-views of all time. Dave Meltzer of the Wrestling Observer Newsletter rated the Intercontinental Title match 3.75 out of 5 stars, the same rating as the main event. The highest rated match was Dean Malenko vs. Scotty 2 Hotty for the WWF Light Heavyweight Championship, rated 4 out of 5 stars. Angle vs. Show was rated 0 stars, the WWF Tag Team Championship Match was rated 3 stars and Guerrero vs. Rios received 2.75 stars.

In 2015, Kevin Pantoja of 411Mania gave the event a rating of 9.0 [Amazing], stating "Not only is this among the best non Big Four Pay-Per-Views ever, but it’s also one of the best PPVs ever, period. The depth of this show is phenomenal as there is a little bit of everything. Benoit and Jericho put on a classic, Trish got what was coming to her, the Hardcore Title was a ton of fun, Eddie and Essa flew all over the place, we had a fun opener and the main event was pretty much the perfect WWE style big match. This show is not only must-see but it’s a must-own event."

== Aftermath ==
The ongoing feud between The Rock and the McMahon-Helmsley Regime would continue for the next couple months. On the next episode of Raw Is War the following night, Vince McMahon made The Rock defend his WWF Championship against Shane McMahon in a steel cage match, where The Rock was successful in defending the title. The Rock would then go on to successfully defend the title in a Triple Threat match against Triple H and Shane McMahon at Insurrextion. Triple H would end up getting a rematch at Judgment Day, an Iron Man Match, with Triple H's old friend, Shawn Michaels, as the guest referee. Triple H would get the deciding victory in the final seconds when The Undertaker interfered, attacking Triple H, which Michaels called as a victory by disqualification for Triple H, causing Triple H to win back the WWF Championship. The Undertaker, now in a new biker gimmick, joined The Rock in a feud with The Regime, with Kane joining in as well, which culminated in a 3-on-3 tag team match at King of the Ring against Triple H, Vince, and Shane, where The Rock once again won the WWF Championship by pinning Vince.

Meanwhile, "Stone Cold" Steve Austin would not appear on WWF television again until September at Unforgiven, when he would start to investigate who ran him over at the Survivor Series the year before.

== Results ==
No.	Results	Stipulations	Times
1	Edge and Christian (c) defeated D-Generation X (Road Dogg and X-Pac) (with Tori)	Tag team match for the WWF Tag Team Championship	8:37
2	Dean Malenko (c) defeated Scotty 2 Hotty	Singles match for the WWF Light Heavyweight Championship	11:47
3	Bull Buchanan and Big Boss Man defeated The APA (Bradshaw and Faarooq)	Tag team match	8:37
4	Crash Holly (c) defeated Hardcore Holly, Jeff Hardy, Matt Hardy, Perry Saturn and Tazz	Six-pack Hardcore match for the WWF Hardcore Championship	12:18
5	Big Show defeated Kurt Angle	Singles match	2:35
6	T & A (Albert and Test) (with Trish Stratus) defeated The Dudley Boyz (Bubba Ray Dudley and D-Von Dudley)	Tag team match	11:06
7	Eddie Guerrero (c) (with Chyna) defeated Essa Rios (with Lita)	Singles match for the WWF European Championship	8:38
8	Chris Benoit (c) defeated Chris Jericho by disqualification	Singles match for the WWF Intercontinental Championship	15:03
9	The Rock defeated Triple H (c) (with Mr. McMahon and Stephanie McMahon-Helmsley)	Singles match for the WWF Championship with Shane McMahon as special guest referee	19:22
(c) / – the champion(s) heading into the match
