= King of the Ring (2000) =

World Wrestling Federation pay-per-view event

- Promotional poster
- Promotion: World Wrestling Federation
- Date: June 25, 2000
- City: Boston, Massachusetts
- Venue: Fleet Center
- Attendance: 17,651
- Buy rate: 475,000
- Tagline: Coronation of a King

Pay-per-view chronology
← Previous; Judgment Day	Next → Fully Loaded

King of the Ring event chronology
← Previous; 1999	Next → 2001

King of the Ring tournament chronology
← Previous; 1999	Next → 2001

The 2000 King of the Ring was a professional wrestling pay-per-view (PPV) event produced by the World Wrestling Federation (WWE). It was the eighth annual King of the Ring event and hosted the finals of the 14th King of the Ring tournament for men. It took place on June 25, 2000, at the Fleet Center in Boston, Massachusetts.

The main event was a six-man tag team match between the McMahon-Helmsley Faction (Triple H, Vince McMahon, and Shane McMahon) and the team of The Rock and The Brothers of Destruction (The Undertaker and Kane). Triple H's WWF Championship was defended in the match where whoever scored the pinfall would win the title; he lost the title to The Rock, who pinned Vince. The undercard featured the 2000 King of the Ring tournament, which was won by Kurt Angle. The 2000 edition was the largest King of the Ring tournament, with 32 competitors taking part.

Other matches featured on the undercard included a three-on-two Handicap Tables Dumpster match between The Dudley Boyz (Bubba Ray Dudley and D-Von Dudley) and D-Generation X (Road Dogg, X-Pac, and Tori), a Hardcore Evening Gown match for the WWF Hardcore Championship between champion Pat Patterson and challenger Gerald Brisco and a four corners elimination match for the WWF Tag Team Championship between champions Too Cool (Grand Master Sexay and Scotty 2 Hotty) and the challenging teams of Edge and Christian, The Hardy Boyz (Jeff Hardy and Matt Hardy), and T & A (Test and Albert).

== Production ==
=== Background ===
King of the Ring was a professional wrestling pay-per-view (PPV) event held annually in June by the World Wrestling Federation (WWF, now WWE) since 1993. The PPV was named after the King of the Ring tournament, a men's single-elimination tournament that was established in 1985 and held annually until 1991, except for 1990, with the winner crowned the "King of the Ring"; these early tournaments were held as special non-televised house shows. Unlike the non-televised events, the PPV did not feature all of the tournament's matches. Instead, several of the qualifying matches preceded the event with the final few matches then taking place at the pay-per-view. Other matches took place at the event as it was a traditional three-hour pay-per-view. The King of the Ring event became considered as one of the WWF's "Big Five" PPVs, along with the Royal Rumble, WrestleMania, SummerSlam, and Survivor Series, the company's five biggest annual shows of the year. The eighth King of the Ring PPV hosted the finals of the 14th tournament, and it was held on June 25, 2000, at the Fleet Center in Boston, Massachusetts.

=== Storylines ===
King of the Ring featured professional wrestling matches that involved different wrestlers from pre-existing feuds, plots, and storylines that were played out on Raw is War and SmackDown!—World Wrestling Federation's television programs. Wrestlers portrayed a heel or a face as they followed a series of events that built tension, and culminated in a wrestling match or series of matches.

The pay-per-view event featured the annual King of the Ring single elimination bracket tournament. At 32 participants, this year's tournament had the biggest field in the tournament's history. The tournament hasn't had a field as large since. The qualification matches for the tournament began on the May 29, 2000, episode of Raw is War, with Rikishi and Bull Buchanan defeating Shane McMahon and Steve Blackman respectively. The qualification matches continued on the June 1 episode of SmackDown, as Kurt Angle defeated Bradshaw and Crash Holly defeated Albert. On the June 4 episode of Sunday Night Heat, Chyna and Val Venis defeated The Godfather and Al Snow in respective matches to qualify for the tournament. On the June 5 episode of Raw is War, WWF Intercontinental Champion Chris Benoit and Hardcore Holly qualified by defeating Road Dogg and Faarooq respectively. On the June 8 episode of SmackDown!, Chris Jericho defeated Test and WWF European Champion Eddie Guerrero defeated Matt Hardy to qualify for the King of the Ring tournament. On the June 11 episode of Sunday Night Heat, Bubba Ray Dudley and Perry Saturn defeated Big Bossman and D-Von Dudley in respective matches to qualify for the tournament. On the June 12 episode of Raw is War, X-Pac qualified for the tournament by defeating Dean Malenko and Jeff Hardy qualified by defeating Christian. The qualification matches for the tournament ended on the June 15 episode of SmackDown!, as Edge defeated one half of the WWF Tag Team Champions Grand Master Sexay and the other half of the WWF Tag Team Champions Scotty 2 Hotty defeated D-Lo Brown. On the June 18 episode of Sunday Night Heat, the tournament started as Bull Buchanan defeated Perry Saturn and Val Venis defeated Jeff Hardy. On the June 19 episode of Raw is War, the tournament matches continued as Kurt Angle defeated Bubba Ray Dudley, Chris Benoit defeated X-Pac, Eddie Guerrero defeated Chyna, Chris Jericho defeated Edge, Rikishi defeated Scotty 2 Hotty and Crash Holly defeated Hardcore Holly.

The main rivalry heading into the event was between the McMahon-Helmsley Faction (Triple H, Vince McMahon and Shane McMahon) and the team of The Rock and The Brothers of Destruction (Kane and The Undertaker). At Judgment Day, The Undertaker returned to the WWF with a new biker gimmick after an eight-month groin injury and attacked Triple H during an Iron Man match between The Rock and Triple H for the WWF Championship. As a result, The Rock was disqualified and Triple H won the match 6–5, thus becoming the WWF Champion. On the June 1 episode of SmackDown!, The Rock, Kane and The Undertaker all won qualifying matches to qualify for a WWF Championship title shot at King of the Ring. On the June 12 episode of Raw is War, WWF CEO Linda McMahon announced that at King of the Ring, The Rock, Kane and The Undertaker would team up to wrestle Triple H, Vince McMahon and Shane McMahon in a six-man tag team match. On the June 15 episode of SmackDown!, a stipulation was added into the match that if Triple H's team won, Triple H would defend the title against the winner of the King of the Ring tournament at Fully Loaded, but if any person from The Rock's team got the pinfall, that person would receive a title shot instead. On the June 19 episode of Raw is War, the stipulation was tweaked so that if any member of The Rock's team got the pinfall at King of the Ring, that person would become the new WWF Champion.

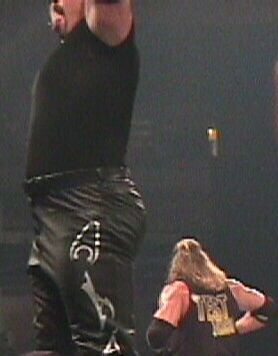
T & A doing their entrance routine before the WWF Tag Team Championship match at King of the Ring

Another major rivalry heading into the event was between Too Cool (Grand Master Sexay and Scotty 2 Hotty), Edge and Christian, The Hardy Boyz (Matt Hardy and Jeff Hardy) and T & A (Test and Albert) over the WWF Tag Team Championship. On the May 29 episode of Raw is War, Too Cool defeated Edge and Christian to win the WWF Tag Team Championship. Edge and Christian invoked their rematch clause for the titles. T & A and the Hardy Boyz were also feuding at the time, and were added into the tag title match, making the match a Four corners elimination match at King of the Ring.

On the June 19 episode of Raw is War, Pat Patterson and Gerald Brisco interfered in a King of the Ring tournament match between WWF Hardcore Champion Crash Holly and Hardcore Holly. Hardcore was disqualified after Brisco hit Crash twice with a 2x4 and, thanks to the 24/7 rule, Brisco pinned Crash to win the Hardcore Championship. After returning backstage, Patterson hit Brisco in the head with a champagne bottle, and pinned him to win the Hardcore Championship. On the June 22 episode of SmackDown!, WWF Chairman Vince McMahon announced that Patterson would defend the title against Brisco in a Hardcore Evening Gown match at King of the Ring.

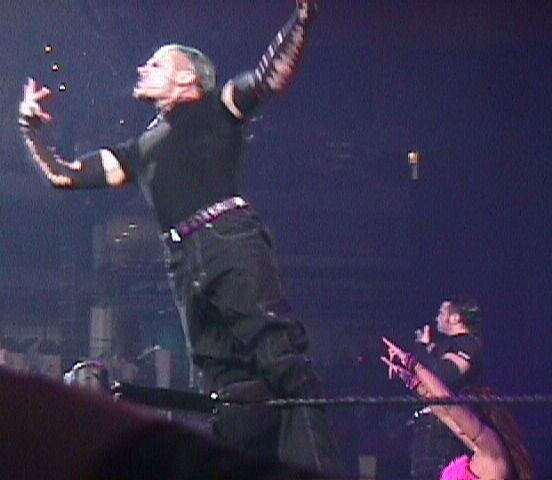
Team Extreme doing their entrance routine before the WWF Tag Team Championship at King of the Ring

At Judgment Day, D-Generation X (Road Dogg and X-Pac) defeated the Dudley Boyz (Bubba Ray Dudley and D-Von Dudley) in a Double Tables match. On the June 19 episode of Raw is War, the Dudleyz cost X-Pac a King of the Ring tournament match against WWF Intercontinental Champion Chris Benoit. As a result, DX and Tori demanded a match against the Dudleyz. WWF Chairman Vince McMahon announced that at King of the Ring, DX and Tori would wrestle the Dudley Boyz in a Handicap Tables Dumpster match at King of the Ring.

== Event ==
Other on-screen personnel
Role:	Name:
English commentators	Jim Ross
English commentators	Jerry Lawler
Spanish commentators	Carlos Cabrera
Spanish commentators	Hugo Savinovich
Interviewers	Michael Cole
Interviewers	Jonathan Coachman
Ring announcer	Howard Finkel
Referees	Mike Chioda
Referees	Earl Hebner
Referees	Jim Korderas
Referees	Tim White
Referees	Theodore Long
Referees	Chad Patton
Referees	Jack Doan

=== Preliminary matches ===
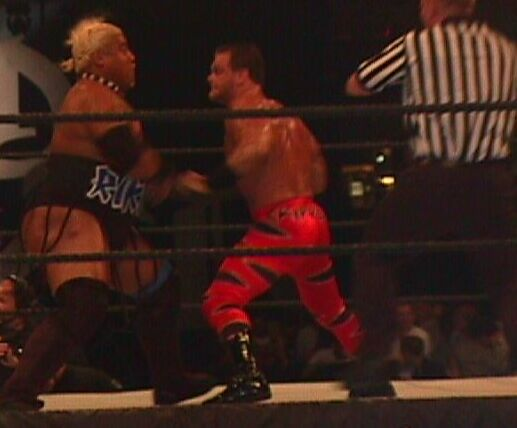
Rikishi and Chris Benoit wrestling at King of the Ring

The first match that aired live on pay-per-view was a King of the Ring tournament quarter-final match between Rikishi and Chris Benoit. Rikishi dominated most of the match until Benoit started using submission maneuvers. He locked in the Crippler Crossface on Rikishi, who caught hold of the ropes. Benoit released the hold but hit Rikishi with a chair and was disqualified, allowing Rikishi to advance to the semi-finals. However, Benoit continued to attack Rikishi with the chair and applied another Crippler Crossface on Rikishi, injuring his shoulder.

The next match in the quarter-final round was between Eddie Guerrero and Val Venis. Guerrero and Venis traded momentum back and forth during the match. In the closing moments of the match, Venis tried to hit a "Money Shot" (diving splash) on Guerrero but Guerrero blocked the move. Venis' valet Trish Stratus then jumped on the apron, prompting Guerrero's valet Chyna to prevent Stratus from interfering. Venis took advantage and scored the pinfall following a fisherman's suplex.

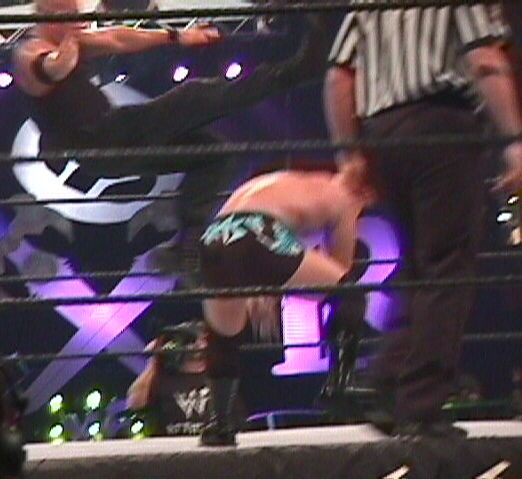
Bull Buchanan vs. Crash Holly at King of the Ring

The quarter-final round continued pitting Bull Buchanan against Crash Holly. Buchanan dominated most of the match and due to his bigger size, Buchanan easily performed his moves on Holly. Buchanan tried to finish Holly with a scissors kick, but Holly ducked the move and pinned Buchanan with a roll-up to win the match.

The final match in the quarter-final round was between Kurt Angle and Chris Jericho. Jericho dominated the early part of the match until Angle got the momentum. Angle continued to perform his moves on Jericho until Jericho regained momentum. In the closing moments of the match, Angle attempted to hit the Angle Slam on Jericho, but Jericho avoided the move and locked Angle in the Walls of Jericho. The WWF Women's Champion Stephanie McMahon then interfered in the match and distracted the referee. Angle tapped out to the Walls of Jericho but the referee was distracted. Jericho released the hold and knocked out the referee. Stephanie tried to hit Jericho with the Women's Championship belt but Jericho ducked and Angle was hit instead. Jericho then kissed Stephanie but Angle got the advantage and hit an Angle Slam on Jericho for the victory.

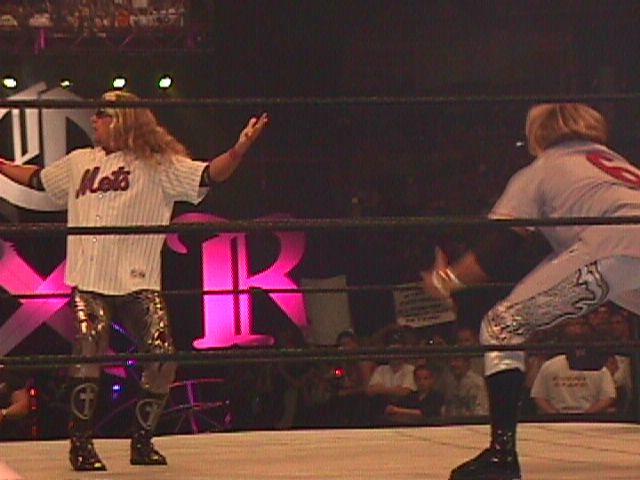
Edge and Christian doing their entrance routine before the WWF Tag Team Championship match at King of the Ring. Edge and Christian would go on to win the match

Next was a four corners elimination match for the WWF Tag Team Championship as the champions Too Cool (Grand Master Sexay and Scotty 2 Hotty) defended the titles against Edge and Christian, the Hardy Boyz (Matt Hardy and Jeff Hardy) and T & A (Test and Albert). T & A was the first team to get eliminated when Matt Hardy pinned Test following Jeff's execution of the Swanton Bomb. The match went back and forth until Christian eliminated the Hardy Boyz by pinning Matt after hitting him with an Impaler. The match was left between Too Cool and the team of Edge and Christian. Too Cool dominated the challengers and seemed to have the match won when Sexay hit Edge with a "Hip-Hop Drop" (diving leg drop) and tried to pin Edge but there was no referee present. Christian took advantage and hit Sexay with a tag team championship title belt, allowing Edge to pin Sexay to win the WWF Tag Team Championship.

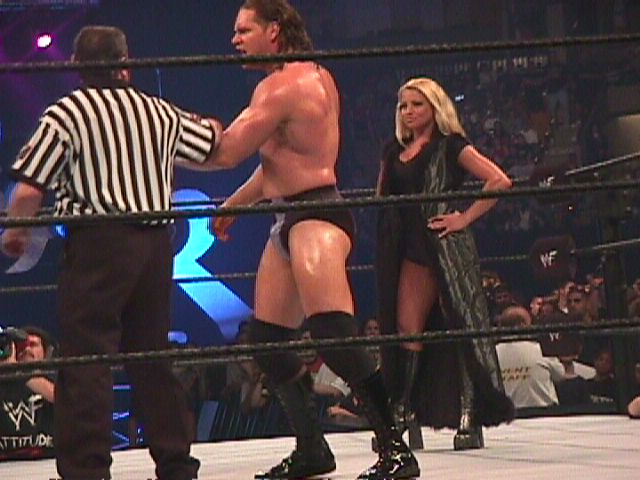
Val Venis and Trish Stratus at King of the Ring

After the tag team title match ended, the semi-final round of the King of the Ring tournament took place with Rikishi taking on Val Venis. Venis dominated the match by working on Rikishi's shoulder that was injured during Rikishi's match against Chris Benoit earlier in the night. Venis further injured Rikishi's arm and continued to damage the arm until Rikishi performed a belly-to-belly suplex on Venis, pinning him for the victory. After the match, Venis' valet Trish Stratus tried to attack Rikishi, but Rikishi countered her attacks. Venis low blowed Rikishi and attacked his injured arm and shoulder with a chair before leaving.

The next match in the semi-final was between Kurt Angle and Crash Holly. Angle dominated the match and pinned Holly after an Angle Slam to advance to the final round.

=== Main event matches ===
The seventh match of the event was a hardcore evening gown match for the WWF Hardcore Championship between champion Pat Patterson and challenger Gerald Brisco. Brisco brought a 2x4 to the ring while Patterson brought a teddy bear to the ring. Patterson suggested that he would lay down for Brisco so that Brisco could easily pin him for the title. Brisco agreed, but Patterson started attacking Brisco. Brisco performed a Bronco Buster on Patterson in the corner. Crash Holly then interfered in the match and attacked Brisco with a trash can. Holly used the 24/7 rule and pinned Patterson to win the Hardcore Championship. As a result, the match resulted in a no contest.

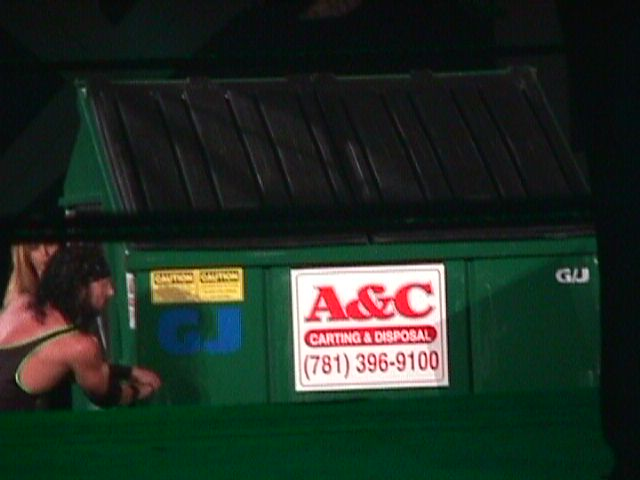
X-Pac wrestling the handicap tables dumpster match at King of the Ring

The eighth match was a three-on-two handicap tables dumpster match pitting the Dudley Boyz (Bubba Ray Dudley and D-Von Dudley) against D-Generation X (Road Dogg, X-Pac, and Tori). The match started in the ring, but the action would quickly move outside the ring. The Dudleyz dominated most of the match by knocking out Road Dogg through a table, eliminating him from the match. X-Pac battled Bubba Ray with some quick moves, but D-Von suplexed X-Pac over the top rope onto the table. Tori hid in the dumpster. The Dudley Boyz began chasing Tori until DX took advantage by attacking the Dudley Boyz with steel chairs. The Dudley Boyz were then shoved into the dumpster and Tori closed the lids of the dumpster. As a result, DX and Tori won the match. After the match, the Dudley Boyz came out of the dumpster and pulled Tori out of the dumpster. DX tried to save Tori, but the Dudley Boyz hit the "3-D" on X-Pac. Road Dogg was also hit with a 3-D. D-Von brought a table and set it in the ring. Bubba Ray caught Tori and powerbombed her through the table.

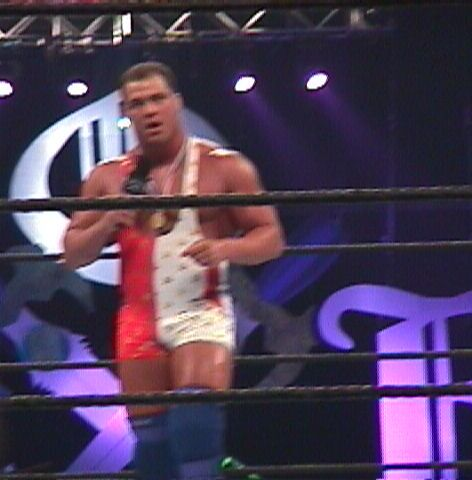
Kurt Angle at King of the Ring. He went on to win the King of the Ring tournament

Next was the final match of the 2000 King of the Ring tournament pitting Kurt Angle against Rikishi. Rikishi dominated most of the match by using his power moves against Angle. Angle took advantage of Rikishi's injuries and focused on his injured arm and shoulder. Angle slammed Rikishi into the steel steps outside the ring and threw Rikishi into the ring. As Angle returned to the ring, Rikishi hit Angle with a Samoan drop, a neckbreaker and a Stink Face but was unable to defeat Angle. Angle performed an Angle Slam on Rikishi but got a near-fall. Rikishi hit Angle with a savate kick and climbed to the top rope. Angle attacked Rikishi and hit him with a super belly-to-belly suplex to win the 2000 King of the Ring tournament.

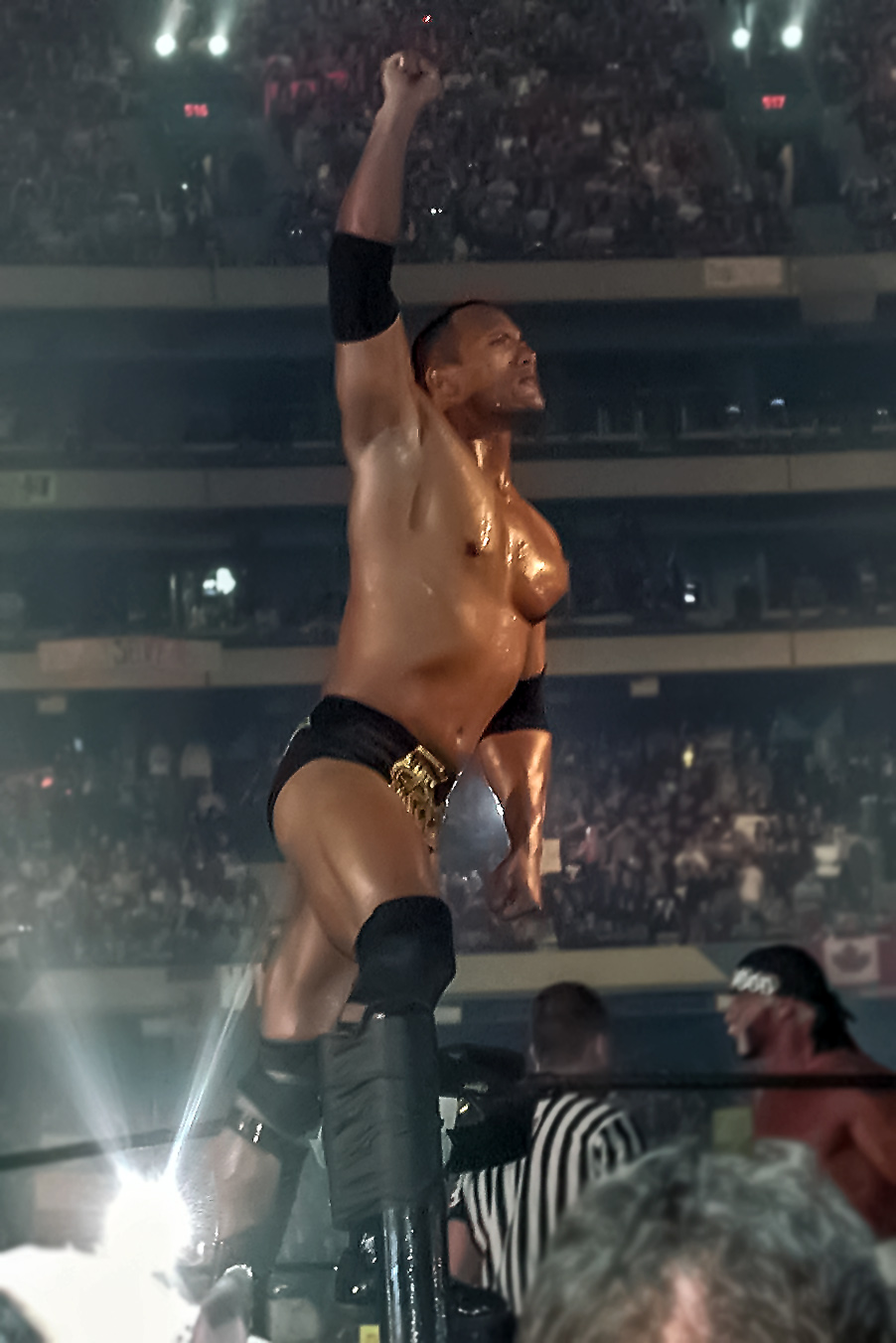
The Rock won the WWF Championship at King of the Ring

The main event was a six-man tag team match between the McMahon-Helmsley Faction (Triple H, Vince McMahon and Shane McMahon) and the team of The Rock, Kane, and The Undertaker for Triple H's WWF Championship. The stipulation was that if a member of The Rock's team got the pinfall at the end of the match, regardless of who it was, that man would be the WWF Champion. If Triple H's team won, then the winner of the King of The Ring tournament (Kurt Angle) would receive a title shot at Fully Loaded in July. The match went back and forth with Rock's team working on Shane in the beginning. Triple H would later tag in and would battle all the three opponents. The match continued with both teams battling on each other. In the closing moments of the match, Rock tried to hit Triple H with a People's Elbow, but Kane attacked Rock. Kane then hit Triple H with a Tombstone Piledriver and tried to pin him, but Undertaker attacked Kane with a chair. Undertaker then chokeslammed Shane from the top rope through the announce table. In the ring, Vince tried to take advantage of a prone Rock with his own version of the People's Elbow, but The Rock countered with a Rock Bottom and got the pinfall to become WWF Champion for the fifth time.

== Aftermath ==
The night after King of the Ring, on Raw Is War, WWF Spokesman, and former commissioner, Shawn Michaels, introduced Mick Foley as the new commissioner of the World Wrestling Federation, while Vince McMahon took a leave to become a "genetic jackhammer", disbanding the McMahon-Helmsley Faction. Triple H demanded to Foley for another shot at the WWF Championship, arguing that he was never, technically, pinned during the match at King of the Ring. Kurt Angle came out and requested that he would be the new contender since he'd won the King of the Ring tournament. As a result, Foley issued a triple threat match with Triple H, Kurt Angle, and The Rock to determine the #1 contender to Rock's WWF Title that night. The Rock won, therefore neither Triple H or Angle would get a title shot. Instead, Shane McMahon, who had also left the McMahon-Helmsley Faction, helped Chris Benoit become the #1 contender. Benoit would receive a WWF Championship match with The Rock at Fully Loaded, but would not win.

By winning the King of the Ring tournament, Kurt Angle's main event push started. After getting his first WWF Championship title shot in a Triple Threat match against The Rock and Triple H at SummerSlam, Angle began allying himself with Triple H, though it quickly became a feud between the two, as Kurt became infatuated with Stephanie. The feud culminated in a match at Unforgiven, which Triple H won. Kurt Angle then defeated Rock for his first of four WWF Championships at No Mercy.

At King of the Ring, Val Venis injured the WWF Intercontinental Champion Rikishi, starting a rivalry between the two. On the July 6 episode of SmackDown!, Rikishi lost the WWF Intercontinental Championship to Venis after T & A (Test and Albert) interfered and then Tazz attacked Rikishi with a television camera. At Fully Loaded, Venis defeated Rikishi in a steel cage match to retain the title.

After King of the Ring, Team Xtreme (The Hardy Boyz and Lita) continued to feud with T & A and Trish Stratus. At Fully Loaded, Team Xtreme defeated T & A and Stratus in a mixed tag team match when Lita pinned Stratus after a moonsault.

== Reception ==
In 2018, Kevin Pantoja of 411Mania gave the event a rating of 2.5 [Very Bad], stating, "A rough show. 2000 had so many great Pay-Per-Views, but this one just missed the mark in so many ways. The booking was strange, with the wrong guys going over on several occasions. Why put DX over the Dudleys? Why have Benoit and Eddie go out so quickly in the tournament? The show features one of the worst matches ever in Patterson/Brisco and only two of the eleven matches crack three stars. Hell, only four of the eleven reached two stars. It might seem harsh, but I just didn’t enjoy this. It would’ve fit in as a WCW 2000 PPV."

== Results ==
No.	Results	Stipulations	Times
1	Rikishi defeated Chris Benoit by disqualification	King of the Ring quarter-final match	3:25
2	Val Venis (with Trish Stratus) defeated Eddie Guerrero (with Chyna)	King of the Ring quarter-final match	8:04
3	Crash Holly defeated Bull Buchanan	King of the Ring quarter-final match	4:07
4	Kurt Angle defeated Chris Jericho	King of the Ring quarter-final match	9:50
5	Edge and Christian defeated Too Cool (Grand Master Sexay and Scotty 2 Hotty) (c), The Hardy Boyz (Jeff Hardy and Matt Hardy) (with Lita), and T & A (Albert and Test) (with Trish Stratus)	Fatal 4-Way elimination match for the WWF Tag Team Championship	14:11
6	Rikishi defeated Val Venis (with Trish Stratus)	King of the Ring semi-final match	3:15
7	Kurt Angle defeated Crash Holly	King of the Ring semi-final match	3:58
8	Pat Patterson (c) vs. Gerald Brisco ended when Crash Holly pinned Patterson	Hardcore Evening gown match for the WWF Hardcore Championship	3:07
9	D-Generation X (Tori, Road Dogg and X-Pac) defeated The Dudley Boyz (Bubba Ray Dudley and D-Von Dudley)	Handicap Tables Dumpster match	9:45
10	Kurt Angle defeated Rikishi	King of the Ring final match	5:56
11	The Rock and The Brothers of Destruction (Kane and The Undertaker) defeated The McMahon-Helmsley Faction (Mr. McMahon, Shane McMahon and Triple H (c)) (with Stephanie McMahon-Helmsley)	Six-man tag team match for the WWF Championship (Note: If Triple H, Shane, or Vince got pinned or submitted, Triple H would lose the title to whoever scored the pin or submission. The Rock won the championship by pinning Mr. McMahon.)	17:54
(c) / – the champion(s) heading into the match

Fatal four-way match eliminations
Elimination no.	Wrestler	Team	Eliminated by	Elimination move	Time
1	Test	T & A	Matt Hardy	Pinned after a Swanton Bomb by Jeff Hardy	3:40
2	Matt Hardy	The Hardy Boyz	Christian	Pinned after Killswitch	7:55
3	Grand Master Sexay	Too Cool	Edge	Pinned after Christian hit Sexay with one of the title belts	14:11

=== Tournament brackets ===
The tournament took place between May 29 and June 25, 2000.

Round of 32 (TV)
Kurt Angle	Pin
Bradshaw	2:46
Bubba Ray Dudley	Pin
Big Boss Man	3:26
Chris Jericho	Pin
Test	4:15
Edge	Pin
Grand Master Sexay	5:09
Crash Holly	Pin
Albert	1:24
Hardcore Holly	Pin
Faarooq	3:04
Bull Buchanan	Pin
Steve Blackman	3:22
Perry Saturn	Pin
D-Von Dudley	4:43
Rikishi	DQ
Shane McMahon	2:35
Scotty 2 Hotty	Pin
D'Lo Brown	3:39
Chris Benoit	Pin
Road Dogg	1:43
X-Pac	Pin
Dean Malenko	2:00
Val Venis	Pin
Al Snow	4:30
Jeff Hardy	Pin
Christian	1:58
Eddie Guerrero	Pin
Matt Hardy	4:10
Chyna	Pin
The Godfather	1:45

Round of 16 (TV)
Kurt Angle	Pin
Bubba Ray Dudley	4:42
Chris Jericho	Sub
Edge	5:29
Crash Holly	DQ
Hardcore Holly	4:17
Bull Buchanan	Pin
Perry Saturn	2:02
Rikishi	Pin
Scotty 2 Hotty	2:53
Chris Benoit	Sub
X-Pac	4:53
Val Venis	Pin
Jeff Hardy	3:56
Eddie Guerrero	Pin
Chyna	2:25

Quarterfinals (PPV)
Kurt Angle	Pin
Chris Jericho	9:50
Crash Holly	Pin
Bull Buchanan	4:07
Rikishi	DQ
Chris Benoit	3:25
Val Venis	Pin
Eddie Guerrero	8:04

Semifinals (PPV)
Kurt Angle	Pin
Crash Holly	3:58
Rikishi	Pin
Val Venis	3:15

Final (PPV)
Kurt Angle	Pin
Rikishi	5:56
