= Survivor Series (2000) =

World Wrestling Federation pay-per-view event

- Promotional poster featuring Stone Cold Steve Austin
- Promotion: World Wrestling Federation
- Date: November 19, 2000
- City: Tampa, Florida
- Venue: Ice Palace
- Attendance: 18,602
- Buy rate: 400,000
- Tagline: The Rules Have Changed

Pay-per-view chronology
← Previous; No Mercy	Next → Rebellion

Survivor Series chronology
← Previous; 1999	Next → 2001

The 2000 Survivor Series was a professional wrestling pay-per-view (PPV) event produced by the World Wrestling Federation (WWF, now WWE). It was the 14th annual Survivor Series and took place on November 19, 2000, at the Ice Palace in Tampa, Florida. The event was highlighted by the titular Survivor Series match, a tag team elimination match that pits teams of multiple wrestlers against each other.

The main event was a No Disqualification match between "Stone Cold" Steve Austin and Triple H. The match resulted in a no contest when the action spilled to the backstage area. The undercard featured two Survivor Series matches; Kurt Angle versus The Undertaker for the WWF Championship; Ivory versus Lita for the WWF Women's Championship; The Rock versus Rikishi; William Regal versus Hardcore Holly for the WWF European Championship; Kane versus Chris Jericho; and Steve Blackman, Crash Holly, and Molly Holly versus T & A (Test and Albert) and Trish Stratus in a six-person mixed tag team match.

== Production ==
=== Background ===
Survivor Series is an annual professional wrestling pay-per-view (PPV) event, produced every November by the World Wrestling Federation (WWF, now WWE) since 1987, generally held around Thanksgiving in the United States. In what has become the second longest-running pay-per-view event in history (behind WWE's WrestleMania), it is one of the promotion's original four pay-per-views, along with WrestleMania, SummerSlam, and Royal Rumble, referred to as the "Big Four", and was considered one of the "Big Five" PPVs with the addition of King of the Ring in 1993. The event is traditionally characterized by having Survivor Series matches, which are tag team elimination matches that typically pits teams of four or five wrestlers against each other. The 14th Survivor Series event was scheduled to be held on November 19, 2000, at the Ice Palace in Tampa, Florida.

=== Storylines ===
Survivor Series featured professional wrestling matches that involved different wrestlers from pre-existing feuds, plots, and storylines that were played out on Raw is War and SmackDown!—WWF's television programs. Wrestlers portrayed a hero or a villain as they followed a series of events that built tension, and culminated in a wrestling match or series of matches.

The main rivalry heading into the event was between "Stone Cold" Steve Austin and Triple H. The rivalry dated back to previous year's Survivor Series, when Austin was run down by a car in the backstage area and was sidelined for one year. At No Mercy, Austin competed against Rikishi in a No Holds Barred match as it was Rikishi, who had run down Austin with the car at Survivor Series. On the November 6 edition of Raw is War, Austin competed against Rikishi and Kurt Angle in a Handicap match. Austin was being double-teamed by Rikishi and Angle until Triple H came to his rescue and forced Angle and Rikishi to retreat. Triple H then assaulted Austin with the sledgehammer and was revealed as the mastermind behind Austin's attack as he wanted to protect his WWF Championship. On the November 9 edition of SmackDown!, the WWF Commissioner Mick Foley announced that Austin and Triple H would compete in a match at Survivor Series. At the event, the match was made a No Holds Barred match.

Another predominant rivalry heading into the event was between Kurt Angle and The Undertaker over the WWF Championship. At No Mercy, Angle defeated The Rock in a No Disqualification match to win the WWF Championship. Undertaker returned to WWF on the October 30 edition of Raw is War after being absent since Unforgiven. On the November 9 edition of SmackDown!, Undertaker defeated Kane, Chris Benoit and Chris Jericho in a Four Corners match to become the #1 contender for the title at Survivor Series.

At No Mercy, Rikishi's interference accidentally cost The Rock, the WWF Championship against Kurt Angle. The next night on Raw is War, Rikishi apologized to Rock for costing him the title and told him that it was just accidental but Rock did not forgive Rikishi. On the October 30 edition of Raw is War, Rikishi attacked Rock after Rock won his #1 contender's match against Chris Jericho. Following the assault, Rikishi revealed that Rock knew about the attack and had given Rikishi, the keys of the truck to run down "Stone Cold" Steve Austin at previous year's Survivor Series. On the November 2 episode of SmackDown!, Rikishi cost Rock, a title shot for the WWF Championship against Angle. On the November 9 edition of SmackDown!, the WWF Commissioner Mick Foley announced that Rikishi and Rock would wrestle in a match at Survivor Series.

On the October 23 episode of Raw is War, Chris Jericho accidentally dropped his coffee on Kane. This angered Kane and he knocked down Jericho through a nearby placed table. On the October 26 episode of SmackDown!, Kane interfered in Jericho's WWF Championship title shot against Kurt Angle and attacked Jericho, causing Angle to retain the title by getting disqualified. Jericho retaliated by costing Kane a WWF Hardcore Championship match against Steve Blackman on the November 6 episode of Raw is War. This eventually set up a match between Kane and Jericho at Survivor Series.

At No Mercy, Eddie Guerrero cost Chyna and Mr. Ass, their tag team match against Right to Censor (Steven Richards and Val Venis). On the October 23 episode of Raw is War, Billy Gunn defeated Venis in a standard wrestling match, despite interference by Right to Censor members. On the October 26 episode of SmackDown!, Chris Benoit and Dean Malenko defeated Triple H and Road Dogg in a tag team match after help by Perry Saturn. Later that night, The Rock, Chyna and Billy Gunn defeated Right to Censor in a six-person tag team match. On the October 30 episode of Raw is War, Guerrero defeated Chyna to retain the WWF Intercontinental Championship and attacked her after the match, causing Mr. Ass to save her from the beating. Later that night, Billy Gunn lost a match to Steven Richards which meant that he could no longer use the name Mr. Ass. On the November 2 edition of SmackDown!, The Radicalz reunited when Eddie Guerrero, Dean Malenko and Perry Saturn helped Chris Benoit in defeating Triple H. On the November 6 episode of Raw is War, D-Generation X also reunited as Triple H, Billy Gunn, Road Dogg and Chyna defeated The Radicalz. Later that night, Triple H turned into a villain as he was revealed to be the mastermind behind "Stone Cold" Steve Austin's attack and as a result, left DX. On the November 16 episode of SmackDown, Road Dogg and his new partner K-Kwik defeated Malenko and Saturn in a tag team match. After the match, WWF Commissioner Mick Foley announced that DX and K-Kwik would compete against Radicalz in a Survivor Series match.

On the Sunday Night Heat before Survivor Series, WWF European Champion William Regal attempted to cut a promo to the crowd. However, he was interrupted by Hardcore Holly, who challenged Regal to a match that night. The match was then made official on the main card.

== Event ==
Other on-screen personnel
Role:	Name:
English commentators	Jim Ross
English commentators	Jerry Lawler
Spanish commentators	Carlos Cabrera
Spanish commentators	Hugo Savinovich
Interviewers	Kevin Kelly
Interviewers	Jonathan Coachman
Interviewers	Michael Cole
Ring announcer	Howard Finkel
Referees	Mike Chioda
Referees	Jim Korderas
Referees	Earl Hebner
Referees	Jack Doan
Referees	Tim White
Referees	Theodore Long
Referees	Chad Patton

Before the event aired live on pay-per-view, Val Venis defeated Jeff Hardy in a standard wrestling match airing live on the Sunday Night Heat pre-show.

=== Preliminary matches ===
The first match that took place was a Six Person Mixed Tag match pitting Steve Blackman, Crash Holly and Molly Holly against T & A (Test and Albert) and Trish Stratus. Test and Albert controlled the match by using their power. However, Crash used his quickness against the big men to keep pace of the match. The action eventually occurred between Molly and Stratus. Test tried to interfere, causing Blackman and Crash to fight Test for Molly's aid. Blackman and Crash battled Test and Albert outside the ring, allowing Molly to perform a Diving Sunset Flip on Stratus to win the match.

The second match was a four-on-four Survivor Series elimination match pitting The Radicalz (Eddie Guerrero, Chris Benoit, Dean Malenko and Perry Saturn) against Billy Gunn, Chyna, Road Dogg and K-Kwik. The two teams battled it out as the match started. Radicalz scored the first elimination when Guerrero hit Chyna with the WWF Intercontinental Championship belt, allowing Saturn to pin her for the elimination. The next elimination was Gunn performing a Sleeper Slam on Guerrero. Radicalz then took control of the match as Benoit eliminated K-Kwik by performing a Bridging German Suplex and then Saturn eliminated Road Dogg by performing a Northern Lights Suplex. Gunn tried to take control when he eliminated Malenko by performing a Legdrop Bulldog, which he called Fameasser. However, Gunn could not control the match for longer as Benoit and Saturn double-teamed him. Gunn tried to perform a Vertical Suplex on Benoit but Benoit countered it and attempted a pinfall. Saturn held Gunn's foot, allowing Benoit to score the pinfall. As a result, Benoit and Saturn survived the match.

The next match was a standard wrestling match between Kane and Chris Jericho. Jericho controlled the earlier part of the match by using his quickness against Kane's power but Kane eventually controlled his high-flying with his high-impact power moves. The action went back and forth as both men countered each other and battled each other's quickness and power. Kane eventually tried to perform a Tombstone Piledriver, but Jericho used his quickness by pushing Kane into the exposed corner of the ring. Kane's face was slammed into the steel pole and Jericho got a near-fall. Jericho then applied the Walls of Jericho, until Kane broke the hold. Jericho performed a Bulldog and tried to perform a Lionsault. However, Kane grabbed the flying Jericho by the neck and performed a Chokeslam to win the match.

The fourth match was a standard wrestling match for the WWF European Championship. William Regal defended the title against Hardcore Holly. The two superstars battled each other as the match went back and forth. Regal eventually started focusing on Holly's injured arm and mainly attacked his arm. This angered Holly and he hit Regal with the European Championship. As a result, Regal won the match and retained the title by disqualification. Holly continued to attack Regal after the match, until Regal finally escaped with the title.

The next match was a standard wrestling match between The Rock and Rikishi. The Rock started attacking Rikishi before the match even started as he performed a backdrop. The Rock went to the ringside and grabbed a steel chair. He tried to hit Rikishi with it but the referee took it away from Rock. As The Rock turned back, Rikishi performed a Savate Kick. Rikishi then focused on The Rock's injured chest and mainly attacked on his chest. As the action continued, the referee was eventually knocked out. Rikishi tried to hit The Rock with a sledgehammer but The Rock punched Rikishi and gave him a Rock Bottom and tried to pin Rikishi, but the referee was knocked out. As the referee recovered, Rikishi kicked out. Rikishi dominated The Rock by performing a Splash. Rikishi then humiliated The Rock by delivering a Stink Face, as Rikishi's gigantic, smelly buttocks was rubbed into The Rock's face. However, despite receiving a devastating Stink Face, The Rock quickly regained control of the match by performing a Clothesline, a Samoan Drop and an Spinebuster and followed up with a People's Elbow on Rikishi to win the match. However, Rikishi attacked The Rock after the match as he performed a Savate Kick and four consecutive Banzai Drops.

The sixth match was a standard wrestling match for the WWF Women's Championship. Ivory defended the title against Lita. Early on in the contest, during an enziguri kick by Lita, one of Ivory's boots struck Lita's cheek, causing it to bleed heavily throughout the match. Ivory dominated much of the match, and towards the end Steven Richards came out and interfered on Ivory's behalf. But when Richards and Ivory consulted outside the ring, Lita attacked both of them by flying over the top rope. Back in the ring, Lita tried to perform a Moonsault, which she called Litasault on Ivory but Richards dragged Ivory out of the ring. The referee was distracted by Richards. Ivory took advantage and grabbed the Women's Championship, trying to hit Lita with it but Lita ducked and suplexed Ivory. She tried to perform a Litasault but Ivory used the title and Lita instead landed on the title. With the referee dealing with Richards, Ivory hit Lita with the Women's title belt and covered her for the pinfall. After the match, the crowd gave Lita a standing ovation due to her effort.

=== Main event matches ===
The next match was a standard wrestling match for the WWF Championship. Kurt Angle defended the title against The Undertaker. The Undertaker dominated the earlier part of the match until Angle tried to take control of the match but failed and The Undertaker continued his momentum into the match until Angle's Team ECK allies Edge and Christian interfered in the match and distracted the referee. The referee eventually ejected them from ringside, allowing Angle to focus on Undertaker's leg and mainly attacked his leg. The Undertaker, however dominated Angle and eventually sent him over the top rope outside to the ring. Angle crawled under the ring to protect himself. The Undertaker eventually pulled him out and dragged him into the ring to perform the Last Ride and attempted a pinfall. The referee started counting but stopped it at 2 after recognizing that it was actually Kurt's brother Eric Angle. Kurt took advantage as he attacked The Undertaker from behind and pinned The Undertaker with a roll-up.

The final match on the undercard was a four-on-four Survivor Series elimination match pitting Dudley Boyz (Bubba Ray Dudley and D-Von Dudley) and Hardy Boyz (Matt Hardy and Jeff Hardy) against Edge and Christian and Right to Censor (Bull Buchanan and The Goodfather). The team of Edge and Christian and Right to Censor dominated the earlier part of the match as Edge scored the first elimination as he performed a Sitout Rear Mat Slam, which he calls Edge-o-Matic on Matt. Christian next eliminated D-Von by performing an Inverted Double Underhook Facebuster, which he called Impaler. The team of Hardy Boyz and Dudley Boyz started gaining control when Edge accidentally performed a Spear on Buchanan, allowing Bubba Ray to pin him for the elimination. Bubba Ray then eliminated Edge by performing a Bubba Bomb and an accidental Diving Splash from Christian. Goodfather stopped the domination of the opposing team as he eliminated Bubba Ray by performing a Death Valley Driver. Jeff controlled the match as he eliminated Christian by performing a High Angle Senton Bomb, which he calls Swanton Bomb. Jeff controlled Goodfather until Val Venis interfered in the match and accidentally clotheslined Goodfather, allowing Jeff to pin him for the victory and thus became the sole survivor of the match. After the match, Richards and Buchanan returned to the ring to help Venis and Goodfather beat up Jeff, only for Matt and the Dudleyz to make the save, as Matt took out Buchanan and Richards with the Twist of Fate and the Dudleyz took out Goodfather with the 3D, and Venis with the Whassup Drop. Matt then put Venis through a table with a legdrop, as Bubba did the same to Richards with a top rope powerbomb.

The main event was a No Disqualification match between "Stone Cold" Steve Austin and Triple H. Both wrestlers attacked each other with several foreign objects and took advantage of no disqualification stipulation. After assaulting Triple H for much of the match, Austin tried to perform a Stone Cold Stunner but Triple H countered it into a neckbreaker. The action spilled to the outside of the ring where Triple H tried to perform a Pedigree on Austin, but Austin backdropped Triple H through the announce table. The two returned to the ring where Austin performed a Stone Cold Stunner but continued to attack Triple H with a steel chair. The two wrestlers continued to fight each other and their action spilled to the backstage area, where The Radicalz interfered in the match. Triple H escaped in a car while Chris Benoit ran away but Austin did not follow him. Eventually, Benoit met up with Triple H where the two tried to find Austin. Triple H sent Benoit to find Austin. Suddenly, Austin appeared in a forklift, and he picked up Triple H's car and dropped it off the forklift from 30 feet in the air. The car landed on its top with Triple H trapped inside. The match resulted in a no contest as Austin celebrated.

== Reception ==
Survivor Series received 400,000 buys, the least buys received by a WWE pay-per-view in 2000. It was met with mixed to negative reviews, and was one of the weaker shows of the year, with no match crossing 3.25 stars. Dave Meltzer of the Wrestling Observer Newsletter rated The Rock vs. Rikishi 3 stars, 0.25 stars to Ivory vs. Lita, 0.5 stars for the European Championship match, 2.75 stars for the Survivor Series elimination match between The Hardy Boyz, Edge & Christian and the Right to Censor, which was the same rating received by the WWF Championship match between Kurt Angle and The Undertaker. Kane vs. Chris Jericho was rated 1.75 stars, The Radicalz vs. Billy Gun, Chyna, K-Kwik and The Road Dogg was rated 1.5 stars and Crash, Molly Holly and Steve Blackman vs. Trish Stratus and T&A was rated 1.25 stars. Meltzer rated the main event as the highest-rated one of the event, with 3.25 stars.

== Results ==
No.	Results	Stipulations	Times
1^{H}	Val Venis (with Bull Buchanan, Christian, Edge and The Goodfather) defeated Jeff Hardy (with Bubba Ray Dudley, D-Von Dudley, Lita and Matt Hardy)	Singles match	8:00
2	Steve Blackman, Crash Holly and Molly Holly defeated T & A (Albert and Test) and Trish Stratus	Six-person intergender tag team match	5:06
3	The Radicalz (Eddie Guerrero, Chris Benoit, Dean Malenko and Perry Saturn) (with Terri) defeated Billy Gunn, Chyna, K-Kwik and Road Dogg	4-on-4 Survivor Series match^{1}	12:41
4	Kane defeated Chris Jericho	Singles match	12:35
5	William Regal (c) defeated Hardcore Holly by disqualification	Singles match for the WWF European Championship	5:06
6	The Rock defeated Rikishi	Singles match	13:00
7	Ivory (c) defeated Lita	Singles match for the WWF Women's Championship	4:55
8	Kurt Angle (c) defeated The Undertaker	Singles match for the WWF Championship	16:15
9	The Dudley Boyz (Bubba Ray Dudley and D-Von Dudley) and The Hardy Boyz (Jeff Hardy and Matt Hardy) defeated Edge and Christian and Right to Censor (Bull Buchanan and The Goodfather) (with Val Venis)	4-on-4 Survivor Series match^{2}	10:04
10	"Stone Cold" Steve Austin vs. Triple H ended in a no contest	No Disqualification match	25:09
(c) / – the champion(s) heading into the match; H / – the match was broadcast prior to the pay-per-view on Sunday Night Heat

=== Survivor Series matches ===
^1

Eliminated	Wrestler	Eliminated by	Method	Time
1	Chyna	Perry Saturn	Pinfall	2:30
2	Eddie Guerrero	Billy Gunn	Pinfall	6:01
3	K-Kwik	Chris Benoit	Pinfall	7:18
4	Road Dogg	Perry Saturn	Pinfall	8:48
5	Dean Malenko	Billy Gunn	Pinfall	10:58
6	Billy Gunn	Chris Benoit	Pinfall	12:41
Survivors:	Chris Benoit and Perry Saturn			

^2

Eliminated	Wrestler	Eliminated by	Method	Time
1	Matt Hardy	Edge	Pinfall	3:59
2	D-Von Dudley	Christian	Pinfall	5:08
3	Bull Buchanan	Bubba Ray Dudley	Pinfall	7:32
4	Edge	Bubba Ray Dudley	Pinfall	7:59
5	Bubba Ray Dudley	The Goodfather	Pinfall	8:40
6	Christian	Jeff Hardy	Pinfall	9:39
7	The Goodfather	Jeff Hardy	Pinfall	10:04
Sole Survivor:	Jeff Hardy			
