= Fully Loaded (2000) =

World Wrestling Federation pay-per-view event

- Promotional poster featuring Stone Cold Steve Austin
- Promotion: World Wrestling Federation
- Date: July 23, 2000
- City: Dallas, Texas
- Venue: Reunion Arena
- Attendance: 16,504
- Buy rate: 420,000
- Tagline: the Crap Shoot.

Pay-per-view chronology
← Previous; King of the Ring	Next → SummerSlam

Fully Loaded chronology
← Previous; 1999	Next → Final

The 2000 Fully Loaded was a professional wrestling pay-per-view (PPV) event produced by the World Wrestling Federation (WWF, now WWE). It was the third annual and final Fully Loaded and took place on July 23, 2000, at the Reunion Arena in Dallas, Texas. In 2001, Fully Loaded was replaced by Invasion, which was then replaced by Vengeance in 2002.

The main event was a standard wrestling match for the WWF Championship. The Rock defended the title against Chris Benoit. The match stipulated that if The Rock was disqualified, he would lose the title. He was disqualified, albeit controversially, and as a result, Benoit won; however, WWF Commissioner Mick Foley overturned the decision and restarted the match, resulting in The Rock pinning Benoit after a Rock Bottom to retain the title.

The undercard featured Triple H versus Chris Jericho in a Last Man Standing match, The Undertaker versus Kurt Angle, Val Venis versus Rikishi in a Steel Cage match for the WWF Intercontinental Championship, Edge and Christian versus Acolytes Protection Agency (Faarooq and Bradshaw) for the WWF Tag Team Championship, Eddie Guerrero versus Perry Saturn for the WWF European Championship, Tazz versus Al Snow, and The Hardy Boyz (Jeff Hardy and Matt Hardy) and Lita versus T & A (Test and Albert) and Trish Stratus in a mixed tag team match.

== Production ==
=== Background ===
Fully Loaded was first held as the 23rd In Your House pay-per-view (PPV) event in July 1998; In Your House was a series of monthly professional wrestling PPV shows first produced by the World Wrestling Federation (WWF, now WWE) in May 1995. The "In Your House" branding was retired following February 1999's St. Valentine's Day Massacre: In Your House event as the company moved to install permanent names for each of its monthly PPVs. Fully Loaded then returned in July 1999 as its own PPV event. The third Fully Loaded event took place on July 23, 2000, at the Reunion Arena in Dallas, Texas.

=== Storylines ===
Fully Loaded featured professional wrestling matches that involved different wrestlers from pre-existing feuds, plots, and storylines that were played out on Raw is War and SmackDown!—World Wrestling Federation's (WWF) television programs. Wrestlers portrayed a villain or a hero as they followed a series of events that built tension and culminated in a wrestling match or series of matches.

The main rivalry heading into the event was between The Rock and Chris Benoit over the WWF Championship. At King of the Ring, The Rock won the title from Triple H in a six-man tag team match when The Rock and his partners The Undertaker and Kane defeated the McMahon-Helmsley Faction (Triple H, Vince McMahon and Shane McMahon). On the July 3 episode of Raw is War, WWF Commissioner Mick Foley announced that The Rock would defend the title against Shane McMahon later that night. The Rock defended the title against McMahon in the main event, which was interrupted by Benoit who attacked The Rock during the match. The next week on Raw is War, The Rock and Benoit competed in a singles match. Although Benoit seemingly won the match after McMahon's interference, the referee Earl Hebner disqualified Benoit due to McMahon's interference. On the July 13 episode of SmackDown!, Foley forced Benoit to wrestle Eddie Guerrero and Chyna in a handicap match. Benoit lost by disqualification again and attacked Hebner, causing The Rock to offer Benoit a WWF Championship shot at Fully Loaded.

Another predominant rivalry heading into the event was between Triple H and Chris Jericho. At King of the Ring, Jericho had kissed Triple H's storyline wife Stephanie McMahon-Helmsley as an act of humiliating her, though Stephanie's interference had ended up costing Jericho the King of the Ring tournament quarter-final match against Kurt Angle. The following night on the June 26 episode of Raw is War, Jericho had a match against X-Pac, who was a member of Triple H's faction D-Generation X and was accompanied by Stephanie, who had sought revenge against Jericho for the previous night. X-Pac defeated Jericho after interference from both Stephanie and Road Dogg and afterwards, Jericho was attacked by X-Pac and Road Dogg, enabling Stephanie to get her revenge and humiliate Jericho by slapping him in the face and kicking him in the groin. Later on that night, Jericho retaliated by costing Triple H a triple threat match against The Rock and Kurt Angle. On the June 29 episode of SmackDown!, Triple H demanded that Commissioner Mick Foley make a match between himself and Jericho that night. Commissioner Foley responded by making a six-man tag team match, pitting Triple H and his DX teammates Road Dogg and X-Pac against Jericho and the Dudley Boyz (Bubba Ray Dudley and D-Von Dudley), which DX won. On the July 3 episode of Raw is War, Foley announced that Jericho and Triple H would wrestle in a match at Fully Loaded. On the July 10 episode of Raw is War, Jericho had a match against Road Dogg, with the former defeating the latter. This led to tension within DX backstage, culminating in a match between Triple H and X-Pac. Near the end of the match, Jericho had come out to attack Triple H, but unbeknownst to him, the entire scenario was an elaborate trap set by Triple H and DX, which led to Jericho being attacked and injured. A week later on the July 17 episode of Raw is War, Foley, at the demand of Jericho, had made Jericho and Triple H's upcoming match at Fully Loaded a Last Man Standing match. Also from within the same night near the end of the main event tag team match between Triple H and Kurt Angle against The Undertaker and Kane, Jericho had unexpectedly appeared while being constantly held back by a large group of WWF referees and officials. Jericho's appearance had cost Triple H the match, soon leading to Jericho attacking Triple H before being stopped and restrained by both the referees and officials.

A third predominant rivalry heading into the event was between The Undertaker and Kurt Angle. On the July 3 episode of Raw is War, Angle helped his Team ECK teammates Edge and Christian in retaining the WWF Tag Team Championship against The Undertaker and Kane, by attacking The Undertaker and getting them disqualified. After the match, he apologized for hurting The Undertaker. The following week, an enraged Undertaker challenged Angle to a match, but Angle proposed the match to take place at Fully Loaded and escaped on a scooter. This made an official match between the two at Fully Loaded.

At King of the Ring, Edge and Christian defeated defending champions Too Cool (Grand Master Sexay and Scotty 2 Hotty), The Hardy Boyz (Matt Hardy and Jeff Hardy) and T & A (Test and Albert) in a Four Corners Elimination match to win the WWF Tag Team Championship. On the July 10 episode of Raw is War, Edge and Christian were scheduled to defend the Tag Team Championship against the APA (Faarooq and Bradshaw), but they got themselves out of the title match when Christian faked that he was sick. Edge agreed to compete in a singles match against Bradshaw, which Edge won. On the July 13 episode of SmackDown, Edge once again refused to defend the Tag Team Championship against the APA, as Edge claimed that he had been injured after being attacked by The Rock. As a result, Faarooq and Christian competed in a singles match, which Faarooq won, but after the match, Edge and Christian attacked Faarooq. On the July 17 episode of Raw is War, the WWF Commissioner Mick Foley announced that Edge and Christian would defend the title against the APA at Fully Loaded.

At King of the Ring, the Hardy Boyz and T&A competed in a Four Corners Elimination match for the WWF Tag Team Championship, won by Edge and Christian. On the July 2 episode of Sunday Night Heat, T&A and their valet Trish Stratus defeated the Hardy Boyz and their valet Lita in a six-person elimination tag team match. The next night on Raw is War, Lita and Stratus managed their respective clients Jeff Hardy and Val Venis in a match, which Venis won after interference by Tazz. This continued as the Hardy Boyz and T&A continued to interfere in each other's matches while Lita and Stratus also continued their rivalry, leading to a six-person tag team match between the teams of T&A and Stratus and the Hardy Boyz and Lita at Fully Loaded.

At King of the Ring, Rikishi defeated Val Venis in the semi-final round match of the King of the Ring tournament. After the match, Venis attacked Rikishi, further injuring him. On the July 6 episode of SmackDown!, Venis defeated Rikishi after interference by Tazz to win the WWF Intercontinental Championship. Venis and Rikishi competed in several matches against each other, leading to a Steel Cage match between the two for the Intercontinental Championship at Fully Loaded.

On the July 17 episode of Raw is War, Dean Malenko challenged Jacqueline and Ivory and offered to defend the WWF Light Heavyweight Championship, but Chyna answered the challenge instead and Eddie Guerrero managed her. During the match, Malenko's Radicalz teammate Perry Saturn interfered by attacking Guerrero, causing Chyna to leave the ring and check on Guerrero. She got counted-out. As a result, Malenko retained the title. On the July 20 episode of SmackDown!, Guerrero defeated Malenko and Saturn in a Triple Threat match to retain the WWF European Championship. After the match, Saturn attacked Guerrero. On the July 23 episode of Sunday Night Heat, WWF Commissioner Mick Foley announced that Guerrero would defend the European Championship against Saturn at Fully Loaded.

== Event ==
Other on-screen personnel
Role:	Name:
English commentators	Jim Ross
English commentators	Jerry Lawler
Spanish commentators	Carlos Cabrera
Spanish commentators	Hugo Savinovich
Interviewer	Lilian Garcia
Interviewer	Michael Cole
Ring announcer	Howard Finkel
Referees	Mike Chioda
Referees	Jim Korderas
Referees	Earl Hebner
Referees	Jack Doan
Referees	Chad Patton
Referees	Tim White
Referees	Theodore Long

=== Preliminary matches ===
The first match was a six-person mixed tag team match pitting Team Xtreme (Matt Hardy, Jeff Hardy and Lita) against T & A (Test and Albert), and Trish Stratus. T & A dominated the earlier part of the match by using their size, and strength against Team Xtreme, until Team Xtreme took control of the match by using their speed, and high-flying moves. The match went back, and forth, as both Lita and Stratus were tagged into the match on numerous occasions. Team Xtreme started dominating the match when Jeff performed a Swanton Bomb on Test, and Matt performed a DDT on Albert. Lita was then tagged in, who hit numerous maneuvers on T & A, until Stratus was tagged in. She hit several moves on Lita, until Lita finished Stratus with a superplex and performed a Litasault to win the match. After the match, T & A attacked the Hardy Boyz while Stratus whipped Lita with her leather belt.

The second match was a standard wrestling match between Al Snow and Tazz. Snow dominated the earlier part of the match by hitting several moves on Tazz before going for Head. Tazz took advantage of the situation and attacked Snow's left knee and injuring it. Tazz focused on Snow's injured leg and continued to attack it throughout the match. Tazz proceeded by suplexing Snow, and tried to apply a Tazzmission, but Snow countered it. However, Tazz applied the Tazzmission again to Snow, forcing him to tap out.

The next match was a standard wrestling match for the WWF European Championship. Eddie Guerrero defended the title against Perry Saturn. Before the match started, Guerrero's valet Chyna knocked down Saturn before chasing Saturn's valet Terri out of the arena. Guerrero began the offensive as Saturn was knocked outside and taken down by Chyna. Guerrero took advantage of the situation by dominating Saturn throughout the match. After a back-and-forth match, Guerrero eventually knocked Saturn outside the ring, who attacked Chyna outside the ring. Terri came back while Saturn used her as a shield. She kicked Guerrero in the groin while Saturn tossed Guerrero into the ring and performed a diving elbow drop on Guerrero to win the European Championship.

The fourth match was a tag team match for the WWF Tag Team Championship. Edge and Christian defended the titles against the Acolytes Protection Agency (Faarooq and Bradshaw). Before the match, Christian had been declared unable to compete due to food poisoning, but Commissioner Foley ordered the match to take place after discovering Christian's deception. As the match started, the APA started attacking Edge and Christian. Christian tried to perform a high-flying attack on Bradshaw, but Bradshaw countered it by performing a fallaway slam. APA continued to dominate the match and the big men overpowered Edge and Christian throughout the match by using their size and strength and power moves until Edge hit Faarooq with the Tag Team Championship belt. As a result, Edge and Christian were disqualified and retained the title, as a title could not change hands on a disqualification. The APA attacked Edge and Christian after the match and continued to attack them throughout the ringside area and the backstage area.

The next match was a steel cage match for the WWF Intercontinental Championship. Val Venis defended the title against Rikishi. As the match started, both men tried to escape the cage on numerous occasions and stopped each other from escaping the cage. Rikishi eventually performed a Banzai Drop to get a near-fall. Venis's valet Trish Stratus interfered in the match by smashing the door of the cage into Rikishi's head. Venis took advantage and performed a Money Shot on Rikishi for a near-fall. Lita then came out and avenged the earlier attack by attacking Stratus with her leather belt. Rikishi took advantage and performed a diving splash onto Venis from the top of the cage. Rikishi was injured a lot and he slowly started moving for the cage door to escape, but Tazz interfered in the match by entering the cage and attacking Rikishi with a television camera. Venis took advantage and pinned Rikishi to retain the WWF Intercontinental Championship.

=== Main event matches ===
The sixth match was a standard wrestling match between The Undertaker and Kurt Angle. The Undertaker rode on his motorcycle during Angle's entrance and started attacking him in the ringside area. The Undertaker and Angle fought each other in the ringside area before entering the ring where The Undertaker dominated Angle by attacking him with maneuvers and stopping his pinfall attempts by pulling up Angle. Angle eventually gained control in the match by attacking The Undertaker's leg and working on it. The Undertaker tried to perform a chokeslam on Angle, but Angle recovered by attempting to perform a submission maneuver on The Undertaker's leg. However, The Undertaker countered it and chokeslammed Angle and followed by performing the Last Ride to win the match.

The final match on the undercard was a Last Man Standing match between Chris Jericho and Triple H. Throughout the match, Triple H attacked Jericho's chest and ribs and tried to injure him and used many of his maneuvers to knock out Jericho, but Jericho got up after being nearly defeated. Jericho and Triple H continued to exchange maneuvers and used several foreign objects on each other. Jericho eventually made Triple H bleed by attacking with chair shots on Triple H's head. Triple H eventually tried to escape the ring and Jericho chased him outside the ring and was thrown into the steel steps. Triple H then tried to perform a Pedigree on Jericho onto the steel steps, but Jericho countered it and then both Jericho and Triple H attacked each other with monitors and were nearly knocked out. The two eventually returned to the ring where Triple H tried to hit Jericho with a Pedigree, but Jericho countered it into a Walls of Jericho. Triple H tapped out but the match could not end in a submission, so Jericho did not release the hold. Triple H went for the ropes and caught hold of them but Jericho did not release it and brought Triple H inside the ring where Triple H's storyline wife Stephanie McMahon interfered and broke the hold. As a result, Jericho applied the Walls of Jericho on McMahon, allowing Triple H to hit Jericho with a sledgehammer. Jericho eventually grabbed the sledgehammer and attacked Triple H in the ribs until both of them fell through a table. Triple H suplexed Jericho into it and both men fell. Triple H got up at a count of 9 while Jericho stayed down for a 10 count. As a result, Triple H won.

The main event was a standard wrestling match for the WWF Championship. The Rock defended the title against Chris Benoit. The title could change hands on a disqualification. Benoit and Shane McMahon taunted The Rock by coming to the ring with his shirt and sunglasses. The Rock and Benoit wrestled in a back-and-forth match, with both men attacking each other with several maneuvers. Benoit eventually performed a diving headbutt on The Rock, but was hurt and was unable to go and attempt a pinfall. This allowed The Rock to perform a spinebuster and The People's Elbow on Benoit, but McMahon distracted the referee, allowing Benoit to kick out at 2. Benoit continued to attack The Rock until The Rock brought a chair into the ring to attack Benoit but dropped it. However, McMahon brought another chair into the ring and hit the referee with it. The Rock mocked Benoit by applying the Crippler Crossface and Benoit tapped out to the hold. However, as the referee recovered, he disqualified The Rock because he did not see McMahon hitting him with the chair, and assumed that The Rock had hit him with the chair instead. As a result, Benoit controversially won the title, but WWF Commissioner Mick Foley came out and restarted the match. The Rock and Benoit continued to battle each other until The Rock performed a Rock Bottom to win the match and thus retaining the WWF Championship.

== Reception ==
The event received 420,000 buys, the same as Judgment Day of the same year. The event was rated as the best pay-per-view of 2000 by YouTube wrestling channel Cultaholic Wrestling in their ranking of every 2000 PPV ranked from worst to best.

== Aftermath ==
The rivalry between The Rock and Chris Benoit slowly died, as Shane McMahon formed a villainous alliance, known unofficially as The Conspiracy, which had consisted of Benoit, Kurt Angle, a returning Big Show, and Edge and Christian. Shane's faction started dominating WWF, as Big Show took out The Undertaker on the July 24 episode of Raw is War, Benoit took out Chris Jericho on the July 27 episode of SmackDown!, and Edge and Christian took out Jeff Hardy on the July 31 episode of Raw is War. On the August 3 episode of SmackDown!, Big Show and Benoit defeated The Rock and Kane in a tag team match, and Big Show took out Kane after the match by chokeslamming him through a hole in the stage. However, the faction started losing its domination on the August 7 episode of Raw is War; when Jericho cost Benoit a WWF Championship title shot in a No Disqualification match against The Rock, The Undertaker attacked Big Show after a six-man tag team match pitting Matt Hardy and the Acolytes Protection Agency (Faarooq and Bradshaw) against Big Show, Edge and Christian. On the August 10 episode of SmackDown!, Jeff Hardy returned as the Hardy Boyz (Matt Hardy and Jeff Hardy) and the Dudley Boyz (Bubba Ray Dudley and D-Von Dudley) attacked Edge and Christian after Edge and Christian retained the WWF Tag Team Championship against Dudley Boyz by getting disqualified. As a result of the circumstances, on the August 17 episode of SmackDown!, a Two out of three falls match was announced between Benoit and Jericho to take place at SummerSlam, and the WWF Commissioner Mick Foley announced that Edge and Christian would defend the Tag Team Championship against the Dudley Boyz and the Hardy Boyz in the first-ever Tables, Ladders and Chairs match at SummerSlam. At SummerSlam, Benoit defeated Jericho in a Two out of three falls match. Later that night, Edge and Christian defeated the Hardy Boyz and the Dudley Boyz in the first-ever Tables, Ladders, and Chairs match to retain the title.

On the July 31 episode of Raw is War, the WWF Commissioner Mick Foley scheduled Triple H and Trish Stratus against The Rock and Lita in a mixed tag team match. Triple H was teaching Stratus a move in the backstage area, to which Triple H's storyline wife Stephanie McMahon-Helmsley suspected that Triple H was having an affair with Stratus, which angered Stephanie. Later that night, The Rock and Lita defeated Triple H and Stratus, and after the match, The Rock knocked Triple H onto Stratus with a steel chair. On the August 3 episode of SmackDown!, Triple H apologized to Stephanie, and informed her that she was his true love. Stephanie forgave him, and the two embraced. Foley announced that Triple H, Stephanie, and Kurt Angle would compete against the Dudley Boyz and Lita in a six-person mixed tag team match. Triple H, Angle, and Stephanie won the match, and after the match, Triple H became jealous of Angle when Stephanie hugged Angle after winning the match. On the August 7 episode of Raw is War, Triple H and Angle both requested Foley to be considered for a WWF Championship match, and Foley announced that the two would compete against each other to determine the #1 contender for the title. Later that night, Chris Benoit and Shane McMahon demanded that Chris Jericho be punished for costing Benoit a WWF Championship title shot against The Rock. Foley responded by adding Jericho to the number one contender's match. The match ended controversially, as both Angle and Triple H pinned Jericho. After the match, The Rock attacked Angle, Triple H, and Stephanie McMahon with Rock Bottoms. On the August 10 episode of SmackDown!, Foley announced that The Rock would defend the title against Angle and Triple H in a Triple Threat match at SummerSlam. At SummerSlam, The Rock defeated Angle and Triple H in a Triple Threat match to retain the title.

The 2000 Fully Loaded would be the final Fully Loaded event, as it was replaced by Invasion the following year, which itself was replaced by Vengeance in 2002.

== Results ==
No.	Results	Stipulations	Times
1	Team Xtreme (Matt Hardy, Jeff Hardy and Lita) defeated T & A (Test and Albert) and Trish Stratus	Six-person intergender tag team match	13:12
2	Tazz defeated Al Snow (with Head) by submission	Singles match	5:20
3	Perry Saturn (with Terri) defeated Eddie Guerrero (c) (with Chyna)	Singles match for the WWF European Championship	8:10
4	The APA (Faarooq and Bradshaw) defeated Edge and Christian (c) by disqualification	Tag team match for the WWF Tag Team Championship	5:29
5	Val Venis (c) (with Trish Stratus) defeated Rikishi	Steel Cage match for the WWF Intercontinental Championship	14:10
6	The Undertaker defeated Kurt Angle	Singles match	7:34
7	Triple H (with Stephanie McMahon-Helmsley) defeated Chris Jericho	Last Man Standing match	23:11
8	The Rock (c) defeated Chris Benoit (with Shane McMahon)	Singles match for the WWF Championship (Note: If The Rock was disqualified, he would have lost the title.)	22:09
(c) / – the champion(s) heading into the match
