= SummerSlam (2000) =

World Wrestling Federation pay-per-view event

- Promotional poster featuring The Rock, Triple H, The Undertaker and Kane
- Promotion: World Wrestling Federation
- Date: August 27, 2000
- City: Raleigh, North Carolina
- Venue: Raleigh Entertainment and Sports Arena
- Attendance: 18,128
- Buy rate: 570,000

Pay-per-view chronology
← Previous; Fully Loaded	Next → Unforgiven

SummerSlam chronology
← Previous; 1999	Next → 2001

The 2000 SummerSlam was a professional wrestling pay-per-view (PPV) event produced by the World Wrestling Federation (WWF, now WWE). It was the 13th annual SummerSlam and took place on August 27, 2000, at the Raleigh Entertainment and Sports Arena in Raleigh, North Carolina. Ten matches were contested at the event.

The main event was a triple threat match for the WWF Championship involving champion The Rock, Triple H, and Kurt Angle. The Rock won the match and retained the title after pinning Triple H following a People's Elbow. One of the predominant matches on the undercard was Kane versus The Undertaker, which ended in a no contest after The Undertaker ripped Kane's mask off which caused Kane to flee. Another featured match on the undercard was the first Tables, Ladders, and Chairs match for the WWF Tag Team Championship, involving champions Edge and Christian, The Hardy Boyz (Jeff Hardy and Matt Hardy), and The Dudley Boyz (Bubba Ray Dudley and D-Von Dudley). Edge and Christian won the match to retain by retrieving the belts suspended above the ring.

== Production ==
=== Background ===
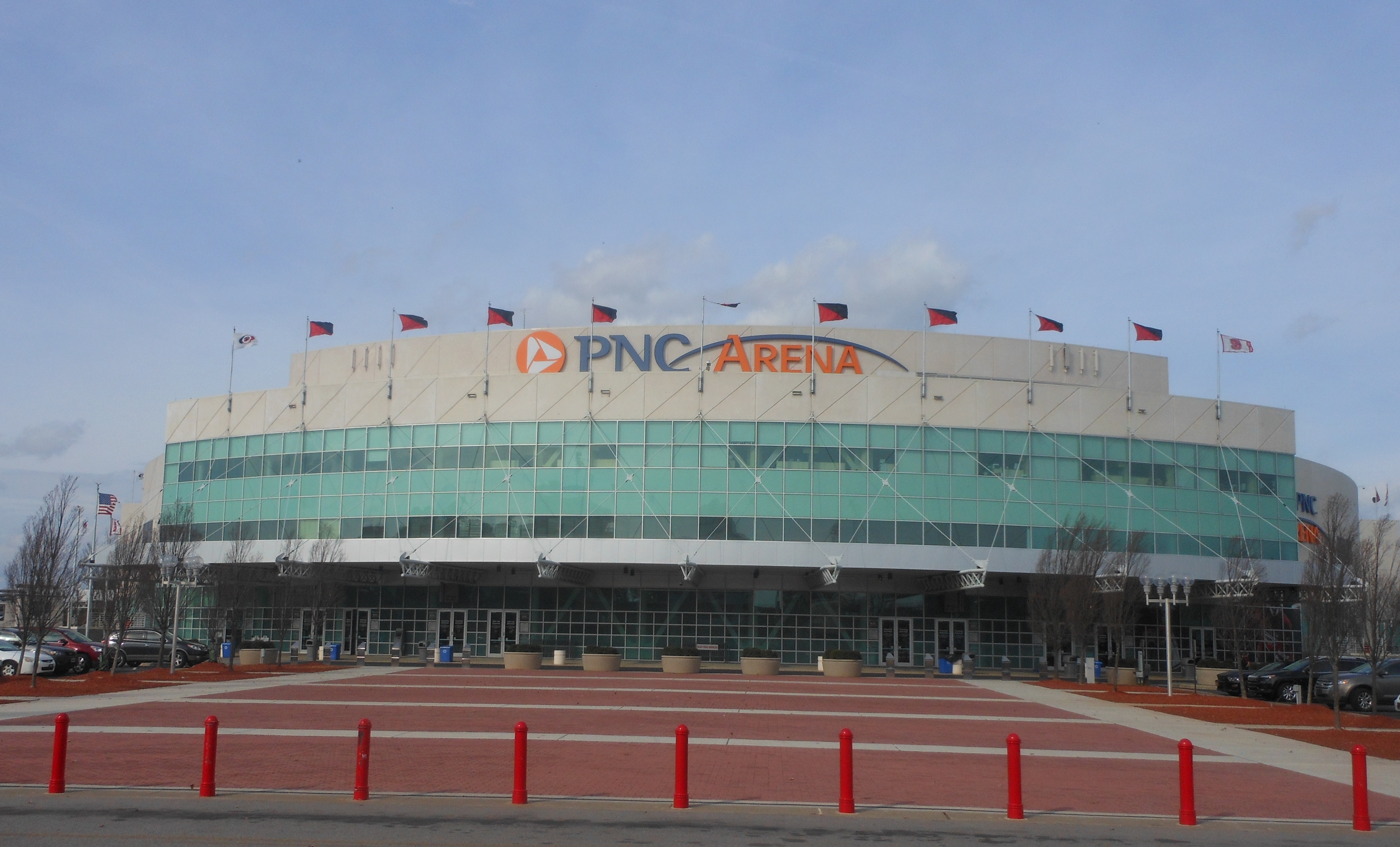
The event was held at the Raleigh Entertainment and Sports Arena in Raleigh, North Carolina.

SummerSlam is an annual professional wrestling pay-per-view (PPV) event produced every August by the World Wrestling Federation (WWF, now WWE) since 1988. Dubbed "The Biggest Party of the Summer", it is one of the promotion's original four pay-per-views, along with WrestleMania, Royal Rumble, and Survivor Series, referred to as the "Big Four", and was considered one of the "Big Five" PPVs with the addition of King of the Ring in 1993. It has since become considered WWF's second biggest event of the year behind WrestleMania. The 13th SummerSlam event was scheduled to be held on August 27, 2000, at the Raleigh Entertainment and Sports Arena in Raleigh, North Carolina.

=== Storylines ===
The professional wrestling matches at SummerSlam featured professional wrestlers performing as characters in scripted events pre-determined by the hosting promotion, World Wrestling Federation (WWF). Storylines between the characters played out on WWF's primary television programs, Raw Is War, and SmackDown!.

On the August 3 episode of SmackDown!, Triple H and his wife, Stephanie McMahon-Helmsley, along with Kurt Angle, were booked in a six-man tag team match by Commissioner Mick Foley against the Dudley Boyz (Bubba Ray Dudley and D-Von Dudley) and Lita; which Triple H, McMahon and Angle won. After the match, as Triple H left the ring, Angle and McMahon hugged in a victory celebration, frustrating Triple H, and marking the beginning of a Triple H-Angle feud. On the August 7 edition of Raw is War, Angle and Triple H were booked in a triple threat match along with Chris Jericho to determine the number one contender for a WWF Championship match against the defending champion The Rock. Both Angle and Triple H simultaneously pinned Jericho, which made both Angle and Triple H co-number one contenders; in frustration, The Rock delivered a Rock Bottom on Triple H, Angle and McMahon, who was at ringside during the match. Later that week on SmackDown!, the match was made official for SummerSlam by Commissioner Foley. He also booked a tag team match, where Angle and Triple H would team up against The Rock and The Undertaker. During the match, Angle accidentally attacked Triple H, causing Triple H to walk out on the match, and a loss for Angle. The following week on Raw is War, Angle, Triple H and Shane McMahon were booked in a six-man tag team match against the Dudley Boyz and The Rock, with the stipulation that if Angle or Triple H walked away from the match, they would lose their number one contender status. During the match, Edge and Christian interfered by attacking the Dudley Boyz, which resulted in Angle, Triple H and McMahon winning the match when Triple H pinned The Rock; as a result of neither Triple H nor Angle walking out on the match, they both were able to keep their number one contender status.

On the August 14 edition of Raw is War, Kane interfered in a match between The Undertaker and Chris Benoit, and chokeslammed The Undertaker. After the interference, Kane rode out of the arena with The Undertaker's motorcycle, which was at ringside, signaling the start of a feud between The Undertaker and Kane, which was the second main feud heading into SummerSlam. On the August 17 edition of Smackdown, the feud intensified during a segment in which Kane attacked The Undertaker with a steel chair, bloodying The Undertaker. On the August 20 edition of Sunday Night Heat, it was made official that The Undertaker would face Kane at SummerSlam.

On the August 10 episode of SmackDown!, the Hardy Boyz (Matt Hardy and Jeff Hardy) attacked the WWF Tag Team Champions, Edge and Christian, after their championship match against the Dudley Boyz. As the Hardy Boyz attacked Edge with a ladder, the Dudley Boyz powerbombed Christian through a table; this began a three-way feud, the third main rivalry heading into SummerSlam. The feud intensified on the August 14 edition of Raw is War, when Edge and Christian attacked Matt Hardy with steel chairs after the Hardy Boyz' match against Right to Censor. Later that night, Commissioner Mick Foley announced the first ever Tables, Ladders, and Chairs match between the three teams in a WrestleMania 2000 rematch for the WWF Tag Team Championship. On that week's edition of SmackDown!, Jeff teamed up with D-Von to face Edge and Christian. During the match, Jeff accidentally delivered a Swanton Bomb to D-Von, which resulted in Edge pinning D-Von for the win. After the match, Matt and Bubba Ray came down to the ring, and the Hardy Boyz and the Dudley Boyz brawled until they were pulled apart by WWF officials. Due to the events that occurred that past week, the Hardy Boyz were booked in a match against the Dudley Boyz the following week on Raw is War, which the Hardy Boyz won. On the final episode of SmackDown! prior to SummerSlam, the Dudley Boyz interfered in a six-man tag team match between the team of the Hardy Boyz and Chris Jericho, and the team of Edge, Christian and Chris Benoit, which resulted in another brawl between the three teams. The interference allowed Jericho to pin Edge for the win.

On the July 27 episode of SmackDown!, Chris Jericho and Lita defeated Chris Benoit and Trish Stratus in a mixed tag team match when Jericho pinned Benoit. Backstage after the match, Jericho in an interview mocked Benoit's claim of being the best "technical wrestler in the world" when Benoit viciously attacked Jericho from behind, and threw him under a steel door before slamming it on his injured ribs. As Jericho coughed up blood, Benoit hit him with a steel chair. On the August 7 episode of Raw is War, Benoit challenged The Rock for the WWF Championship in a no disqualification match. As Benoit was putting the Crippler Crossface on The Rock, Jericho interfered in the match, and attacked Benoit before running off Shane McMahon, who attempted to interfere in the match on Benoit's behalf. The Rock retained the title after a Rock Bottom. When Benoit and Shane complained to Commissioner Foley about Jericho's interference, Foley put Jericho in the number one contender's match with Triple H and Kurt Angle which Jericho would lose when both men pinned him simultaneously. On the August 10 episode of SmackDown!, Benoit and Intercontinental Champion Val Venis defeated Jericho and Eddie Guerrero when Benoit pinned Guerrero after a Diving Headbutt. After the match, Jericho attacked Benoit and put him in the Walls of Jericho. When Shane tried to make the save, Jericho put him in the same maneuver. Later that night, Jericho demanded a match against Benoit which Foley made for SummerSlam. The weeks leading up to the match would see Benoit and Jericho attacking each other and interfering in title matches by one costing the other. The match was later announced to be a Two-out-of-three falls match.

== Event ==
Other on-screen personnel
Role:	Name:
English commentators	Jim Ross
English commentators	Jerry Lawler
Spanish commentators	Carlos Cabrera
Spanish commentators	Hugo Savinovich
Interviewer	Lilian Garcia
Interviewer	Michael Cole
Ring announcer	Howard Finkel
Referees	Mike Chioda
Referees	Jim Korderas
Referees	Earl Hebner
Referees	Jack Doan
Referees	Chad Patton
Referees	Tim White

=== Preliminary matches ===
The first match that aired was a six-man tag team match between the team of Right to Censor (The Goodfather, Steven Richards, and Bull Buchanan) and Too Cool (Rikishi, Scotty 2 Hotty, and Grandmaster Sexay). Too Cool gained the early advantage, but The Goodfather retaliated by hitting a Big Boot on Sexay. Right to Censor continued with the advantage until midway into the match, when Richards attempted an aerial technique. Sexay, however, crotched Richards on the top turnbuckle, and Superplexed him. Hotty was then tagged into the match, where he attempted to deliver a Worm to no avail, as Richards delivered a superkick on Hotty before pinning him to win the match.

The next match was the encounter of Road Dogg and X-Pac. Both men fought back, and forth in the beginning of the match, but Dogg gained the advantage after countering an X-Factor into a powerbomb. Although Dogg had the advantage, X-Pac retaliated by successfully hitting a low blow, and another X-Factor into a pinfall, and winning the match. After the match, Road Dogg hit X-Pac with a pumphandle slam and performed some crotch chops.

The third match was an Intercontinental Championship Intergender Tag Team match between the team of Trish Stratus and defending champion Val Venis against the team of Chyna and Eddie Guerrero. In this match, the wrestler who gained the first pinfall would become the Intercontinental Champion. Guerrero and Chyna gained the early advantage in the match, but as Guerrero attempted a Hurricanrana, Venis countered it into a powerbomb. As the men tagged in the women, Chyna delivered a Military Press Slam on Stratus into a pinfall, winning the match for the team of herself and Guerrero. Due to pre-match stipulations, Chyna became the new Intercontinental Champion.

The next match was the encounter of Jerry Lawler and Tazz. The match began as Tazz gained the advantage, but Lawler retaliated by delivering a piledriver on Tazz. As Tazz recuperated, he applied the Tazzmission on Lawler; in desperation, Jim Ross, the commentating partner of Lawler, hit Tazz with a glass jar, breaking it over his head and allowing Lawler to pin Tazz for the win.

The fifth match was a Hardcore Championship match between Steve Blackman and the defending champion, Shane McMahon. Blackman had the advantage over McMahon midway into the match, until Test and Albert interfered on McMahon's behalf by double teaming Blackman. Nevertheless, Blackman retaliated as he hit both men with a kendo stick, which allowed McMahon to attempt an escape from the ring. Blackman then chased McMahon until both men were on a high steel structure, which was a part of the stage set. Blackman then hit McMahon with a kendo stick three times, causing him to fall from the steel structure onto the arena concrete floor. After the fall, Blackman performed an Elbow drop and got a pinfall to win the match and the Hardcore Championship.

The next match was a two out of three falls match between Chris Benoit and Chris Jericho. Amid the action, Jericho attempted a Lionsault, which Benoit countered into a Crippler Crossface, forcing Jericho to submit and winning the first fall. After the first fall, Benoit retained the advantage, but after he delivered two Belly to Belly suplexes, Jericho countered a third one into the Walls of Jericho, forcing Benoit to submit and allowing Jericho to win his first fall (the second fall in the match). As Benoit and Jericho fought back and forth, Benoit countered a Cradle by Jericho into one of his own, and he pinned Jericho by holding on to the ring ropes for leverage to win his second fall (the third fall overall) and the match.

=== Main event matches ===
The seventh match was the first triple threat tag team Tables, Ladders, and Chairs match for the WWF Tag Team Championship between the team of the Hardy Boyz (Matt Hardy and Jeff Hardy), Edge and Christian, and the Dudley Boyz (Bubba Ray Dudley and D-Von Dudley). The Dudley Boyz gained an advantage in the match when they delivered a 3-D on Christian through a table. Jeff Hardy then attempted a Swanton Bomb on Bubba through a table, but it backfired when Bubba moved and Jeff went through the table. Subsequently, Edge and Christian knocked Bubba off of a ladder outside of the ring, through four double-stacked tables. Lita, the associate of the Hardy Boyz, then came down to the ring, pushing Edge and Christian off a ladder. This allowed Matt to climb a ladder to retrieve the championship belts, but D-Von pushed the ladder, resulting in Matt falling at ringside through two double-stacked tables. Lita came to check on Matt, but she was brutally speared by Edge in retaliation and was taken out of the match. D-Von then climbed another ladder, along with Jeff, but Edge and Christian knocked the ladder over, leaving Jeff and D-Von hanging on the belt; Jeff then kicked D-Von a few times, causing the latter to fall into the ring. Jeff was eventually hit with a ladder by Christian and fell into the ring, allowing Edge and Christian to climb another ladder and retrieve the championship belts to retain the Tag Team Championship.

The next match was a Stinkface match between The Kat and Terri. After back and forth action between the two women, The Kat gained the advantage after she performed a powerslam on Terri and then threw Terri into the turnbuckle and delivered a Stinkface on her for the win.

The final match on the undercard was the encounter of Kane and The Undertaker. Before the match began, Kane attacked The Undertaker on the ring aisle. Kane then attempted to attack The Undertaker with the steel ring steps, but The Undertaker retaliated by avoiding the attack. Kane then performed a low blow on The Undertaker, who retaliated by delivering a Spear and ripping Kane's mask off, which resulted in Kane exiting the ring to the backstage area, ending the match with no winner (aka no contest).

The final match of the night was a WWF Championship Triple-Threat match between Triple H, Kurt Angle, and the defending champion, The Rock. Before The Rock made his entrance, Angle and Triple H fought at ringside, with Triple H delivering a Pedigree on Angle on the commentator's announce table, which broke prematurely, resulting in Angle being injured with a concussion though he was to have been (kayfabe) out of the match during this time anyway. After the incident, The Rock made his entrance down to the ring. He wrestled Triple H as Angle was attended by EMTs, who transported Angle backstage. Stephanie McMahon-Helmsley then came down to the ring and attempted to interfere by hitting The Rock with the WWF Championship belt. She accidentally hit Triple H, however, which resulted in Triple H ordering McMahon to the backstage area. Angle returned to the ring midway through the match, alongside McMahon, and attacked Triple H. As Triple H recuperated, Angle called McMahon to give him a sledgehammer, but Angle and Triple H brawled over the sledgehammer, resulting in Triple H accidentally hitting McMahon. This situation allowed The Rock to throw Angle over the top rope onto ringside and deliver a People's Elbow on Triple H into a pinfall to win the match and retain the WWF Championship.

== Reception ==
In 2006, J.D. Dunn of 411Mania gave the event a rating of 8.5 [Very Good], writing, "This was the height of the WWF as former Daily Show writer Chris Kreski booked one of the more compelling soap opera angles in WWE history. Unlike what Russo did, Kreski's stuff was always streamlined so it never spun out of control or lost focus like so many Russo angles. Plus, with Jericho, and the Radicalz in the WWF, there was now enough actual talent to put some wrestling on their wrestling show. Imagine that. Most of the matches are throwaways, but the right people were put in the right places to do the right matches, and that's where the entertainment comes from. Solid thumbs up."

== Aftermath ==
The Kurt Angle–Triple H feud would continue after SummerSlam. On the first episode of Raw is War after SummerSlam, Angle interfered in a match between Triple H, and Eddie Guerrero by attacking both men with a steel chair. The feud intensified once more, as Triple H, and Angle brawled on the September 11 episode of Raw is War after a match between Triple H, and Chris Jericho. Later that night, Commissioner Mick Foley booked a match between Angle, and Triple H at Unforgiven. The following week on Raw is War, Foley announced that he would be the Special Guest Referee for the match between Triple H, and Angle. On the final episode of SmackDown! before Unforgiven, the feud escalated when Angle attacked Triple H with a sledgehammer, resulting in Triple H becoming unconscious, and allowing Angle to kiss Triple H's wife, Stephanie McMahon-Helmsley, who was at ringside. At Unforgiven, Triple H pinned Angle after a Pedigree.

After SummerSlam, a feud began between Kane, The Undertaker, The Rock, and Chris Benoit over the WWF Championship. Kane and The Undertaker continued to feud on the August 28 episode of Raw is War, where The Undertaker interfered in a WWF Championship match between Kane and The Rock (the winner of the match). The feud between Kane and Benoit began on the September 4 episode of Raw is War during a WWF Championship number one contender's match, as Benoit attacked Kane with a steel chair. The feud between Kane and The Rock began later that week on SmackDown!, when Kane chokeslammed The Rock through the commentator's announce table. The following week on Raw is War, the feud between Kane, Benoit, The Undertaker, and The Rock officially began, as Kane, Benoit, and The Undertaker cut promos about how they deserved to face The Rock at Unforgiven for the WWF Championship. The situation resulted in a brawl between all four wrestlers. Later that night, Commissioner Foley announced that a Fatal-Four Way match would take place at Unforgiven for the WWF Championship. At Unforgiven, The Rock retained the WWF Championship after he performed a Rock Bottom on Benoit into a pinfall.

The feud between the Hardy Boyz and Edge and Christian over the WWF Tag Team Championship continued after SummerSlam. On the Raw is War edition after SummerSlam, the Hardy Boyz and Edge and Christian brawled throughout the night on different occasions. On the September 11 edition of Raw is War, The Hardy Boyz defeated the Dudley Boyz in a tag team match to become the number one contenders for the WWF Tag Team Championship. The following week on SmackDown!, Commissioner Foley announced a Steel Cage match for the WWF Tag Team Championship at Unforgiven, between the teams of Edge and Christian and the Hardy Boyz. At Unforgiven, The Hardy Boyz escaped the Steel Cage to win the match and the WWF Tag Team Championship. After the Dudley Boyz were unable to win the number one contender's match, they were involved in a short-lived feud with the A.P.A, as the Dudley Boyz defeated the A.P.A on the September 4 edition of Raw is War. The defeat led to the A.P.A challenging the Dudley Boyz to a Bar Room Brawl, which ended in a no contest. After the match, the Dudley Boyz and the A.P.A. united as they drank beer and attacked Kai En Tai. The Dudley Boyz then began a feud with the Right to Censor on the September 18 edition of Raw is War, where after losing a match to the Dudley Boyz, all four members of Right to Censor attacked them. The attack led to the A.P.A coming down to the ring to help the Dudley Boyz. On the September 21 edition of SmackDown!, Commissioner Foley announced an eight-man tag team match between the team of Right to Censor against the team of the Dudley Boyz and the A.P.A at Unforgiven. At Unforgiven, Right to Censor defeated the Dudley Boyz and the A.P.A.

On the September 4 edition of Raw is War, Eddie Guerrero won the Intercontinental Championship from his storyline girlfriend Chyna in a triple-threat match involving Kurt Angle. Eddie stated the pinfall was him trying to revive Chyna.

== Results ==
No.	Results	Stipulations	Times
1	Right to Censor (Steven Richards, Bull Buchanan and The Goodfather) defeated Too Cool (Scotty 2 Hotty, Grand Master Sexay and Rikishi)	Six-man tag team match	4:57
2	X-Pac defeated Road Dogg	Singles match	4:31
3	Eddie Guerrero and Chyna defeated Val Venis (c) and Trish Stratus	Intergender tag team match for the WWF Intercontinental Championship (Note: Chyna won the championship by pinning Trish Stratus.)	7:04
4	Jerry Lawler defeated Tazz	Singles match	4:21
5	Steve Blackman defeated Shane McMahon (c)	Hardcore match for the WWF Hardcore Championship	10:17
6	Chris Benoit defeated Chris Jericho 2-1	Two-out-of-three falls match	13:01
7	Edge and Christian (c) defeated The Dudley Boyz (Bubba Ray Dudley and D-Von Dudley) and The Hardy Boyz (Matt Hardy and Jeff Hardy)	Tables, Ladders and Chairs match for the WWF Tag Team Championship	15:28
8	The Kat (with Al Snow) defeated Terri (with Perry Saturn)	Stinkface match	3:07
9	The Undertaker vs. Kane ended in a no contest	Singles match	7:33
10	The Rock (c) defeated Triple H and Kurt Angle	Triple threat match for the WWF Championship	20:11
(c) / – the champion(s) heading into the match
