= WWF Judgment Day (2000) =

World Wrestling Federation pay-per-view event

Judgment Day
- Promotional poster featuring Kane
- Promotion: World Wrestling Federation
- Date: May 21, 2000
- City: Louisville, Kentucky
- Venue: Freedom Hall
- Attendance: 16,827
- Buy rate: 420,000

Pay-per-view chronology
← Previous; Insurrextion	Next → King of the Ring

Judgment Day chronology
← Previous; In Your House	Next → 2001

The 2000 Judgment Day was a professional wrestling pay-per-view (PPV) event produced by the World Wrestling Federation (WWF, now WWE). It was the second Judgment Day and took place on May 21, 2000, at Freedom Hall in Louisville, Kentucky. The first Judgment Day event was held under the In Your House series in October 1998. In May 1999, Over the Edge, another former In Your House event, was established to be the annual May PPV, but as a result of Owen Hart's death at the 1999 Over the Edge, Judgment Day was reinstated to replace Over the Edge in 2000 and was rebranded as the WWF's annual May PPV. It was the fifth former In Your House event to continue as its own distinct PPV series, after Over the Edge, Fully Loaded, Unforgiven, and No Way Out.

The main event was an Iron Man match for the WWF Championship with Triple H facing The Rock featuring Shawn Michaels as the special guest referee. Triple H defeated The Rock to win the championship by 6 falls to 5, after a disqualification in the final seconds by Shawn Michaels as a result of interference by the returning Undertaker. Featured matches on the undercard included a Tag Team Tables match featuring D-Generation X (Road Dogg and X-Pac) defeating The Dudley Boyz (Bubba Ray Dudley and D-Von Dudley). The other featured match on the undercard was a Submission match for the WWF Intercontinental Championship between Chris Benoit and Chris Jericho, which Benoit won to retain the championship.

The event grossed over $596,050 in ticket sales from an attendance of 16,827.

== Production ==
=== Background ===
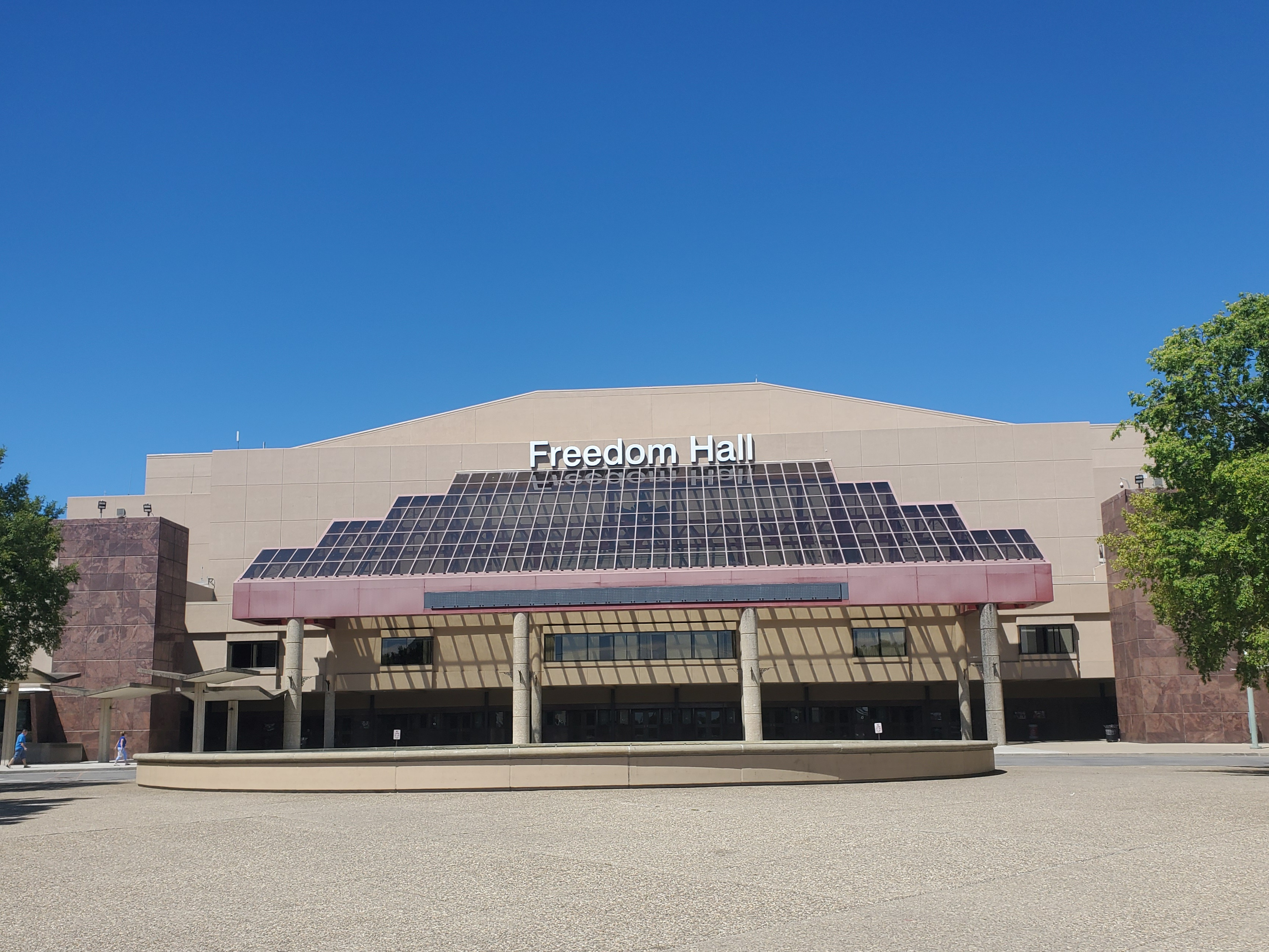
The event was held at Freedom Hall in Louisville, Kentucky.

From May 1995 to February 1999, the World Wrestling Federation (WWF, now WWE) ran a series of professional wrestling pay-per-view (PPV) events titled In Your House. They aired when the promotion was not holding one of its then-five major PPVs (WrestleMania, King of the Ring, SummerSlam, Survivor Series, and Royal Rumble) and were sold at a lower cost. Following the St. Valentine's Day Massacre: In Your House event in February 1999, the WWF retired the In Your House branding and transitioned to giving each monthly PPV a permanent identity.

After the discontinuation of the In Your House series, the WWF held Over the Edge in May 1999, itself a former In Your House event. Due to the tragic death of wrestler Owen Hart at the 1999 Over the Edge, however, the WWF canceled its plans to continue the event as the annual May PPV and instead reinstated Judgment Day for May 2000, another former In Your House event that was first held as the 25th In Your House in October 1998. This second Judgment Day was scheduled to be held on May 21, 2000, at Freedom Hall in Louisville, Kentucky. It subsequently became the annual May PPV and it was the fifth former In Your House event to continue as its own distinct PPV series, after Over the Edge, Fully Loaded, Unforgiven, and No Way Out.

=== Storylines ===
The main event of the evening was a 60-minute Iron Man match between Triple H and the then-current WWF Champion, The Rock. At WrestleMania 2000, Vince McMahon turned on The Rock and helped Triple H retain his title, joining his daughter Stephanie and son Shane in the McMahon-Helmsley Regime with Triple H and D-Generation X. In the weeks leading up to Backlash, The Rock and Triple H's hostility had seemingly reached its climax. With the help of "Stone Cold" Steve Austin, The Rock defeated Triple H at Backlash to win the WWF Championship. The next week on Raw, Triple H stated that his rivalry with The Rock was "just beginning", and the following week, challenged The Rock to a 60-minute Iron Man match for the WWF Championship, One week later, Shawn Michaels would make a surprise return to the company, announcing that he would serve as special guest referee for the match.

Another major rivalry heading into the event saw Shane McMahon begin a rivalry with the Big Show. Leading into WrestleMania, Shane had aligned himself with Big Show, who at the time was feuding with The Rock after Rock's victory in January's Royal Rumble match. Shane would then interfere in their match at No Way Out in February and help Big Show win, which earned Show the #1 contendership and a match with then-WWF Champion Triple H, whom Big Show had previously defeated for the title at Survivor Series in November 1999. The match eventually grew to include The Rock and Mick Foley, and Big Show was the first wrestler eliminated from the ensuing Elimination Fatal-Four-Way main event. After WrestleMania, with Shane primarily siding with Triple H, Big Show began a brief period where he would imitate other wrestlers in a comedic role, which would lead him to gradually become a fan favorite. This earned him ridicule from Shane, so the two began a rivalry that led to a match at Judgment Day.

Another feud involving the Regime was DX's feud with the Dudley Boyz, which had started when the Dudleyz defeated the New Age Outlaws at No Way Out for the WWF Tag Team Championship and caused the breakup of the Outlaws. Although the Dudleys did help out the Regime at times, they eventually turned on them and became heroes in the eyes of the fans. At the time, Bubba Ray Dudley had taken to powerbombing many of the WWF's female wrestlers through tables and was keen on doing so to Tori, who was X-Pac's storyline girlfriend. This led to a Tag Team Tables match being set for Judgment Day.

The ongoing rivalry between Chris Benoit and Chris Jericho over the WWF Intercontinental Championship began at WrestleMania 2000 where Benoit and Jericho, along with Kurt Angle, faced each other in a Two-Fall Triple Threat match for both Angle's Intercontinental Championship and European Championship. Benoit won the Intercontinental Championship after pinning Jericho, while Jericho won the European Championship after pinning Benoit. Jericho lost the European Championship to Eddie Guerrero the following night on Raw after Chyna turned on Jericho and aligned with Guerrero. Benoit would defend the Intercontinental Championship against Jericho at Backlash where Benoit won by disqualification after Jericho used the title belt to defend himself from Benoit's Diving Headbutt and was disqualified as a result. Benoit and Jericho had a rematch for the title on the May 4 episode of SmackDown! which Jericho won after hitting Benoit with the title belt and hitting him with the Lionsault. After aiding The Rock, confronting and insulting the McMahon-Helmsley Regime, Jericho was forced to defend the Intercontinental Championship on the May 8 episode of Raw. After retaining the title against Kurt Angle and later Big Show, Jericho lost the Intercontinental Championship back to Benoit after special guest referee Triple H purposely got distracted by his wife Stephanie McMahon-Helmsley while Benoit tapped out to the Walls of Jericho and, after Jericho hit him to get his attention, Triple H hit Jericho from behind causing Jericho to be locked in Benoit's Crippler Crossface before Triple H called for the bell and awarded the title to Benoit despite Jericho not submitting. Benoit later announced that he would give Jericho a rematch for the Intercontinental Championship at Judgment Day in a submission match.

== Event ==
Other on-screen personnel
Role:	Name:
English commentators	Jim Ross
English commentators	Jerry Lawler
Spanish commentators	Carlos Cabrera
Spanish commentators	Hugo Savinovich
Interviewers	Michael Cole
Interviewers	Jonathan Coachman
Ring announcer	Howard Finkel
Referees	Mike Chioda
Referees	Earl Hebner
Referees	Jim Korderas
Referees	Tim White
Referees	Theodore Long
Referees	Chad Patton
Referees	Jack Doan

=== Preliminary matches ===
The event opened with Team ECK (Kurt Angle, Edge, and Christian) facing Too Cool (Scotty 2 Hotty, Grand Master Sexay, and Rikishi). Grand Master Sexay performed the Hip Hop Drop on Edge to win the match.

Next, Eddie Guerrero defended the WWF European Championship against Perry Saturn and Dean Malenko in a Triple Threat match. After Chyna hit Saturn with a lead pipe that was hidden in a bouquet of roses, Guererro pinned Malenko with an Oklahoma Roll to retain the title.

After that, Shane McMahon faced Big Show in a Falls Count Anywhere match. After interference from Big Boss Man, Test, Albert, Trish Stratus, and Bull Buchanan, Shane pushed an amplifier onto Big Show's leg and hit him with a cinderblock to win the match.

Later, Chris Benoit defended the WWF Intercontinental Championship against Chris Jericho in a Submission match. Jericho passed out to the Crippler Crossface by Benoit, meaning Benoit won the match and retained the title.

In the fifth match, D-Generation X (Road Dogg and X-Pac) faced The Dudley Boyz (Bubba Ray Dudley and D-Von Dudley) in a Tag Team Tables match. X-Pac performed a Super X-Factor through a table on Bubba to win the match.

=== Main event ===
In the main event, The Rock defended the WWF Championship against Triple H in a 60-minute Iron Man match with Shawn Michaels as the special guest referee. The Rock performed a Rock Bottom on Triple H to make the score 1–0. Triple H performed a Pedigree on The Rock to make the score 1–1. Triple H pinned The Rock with a Small Package to make the score 2–1. Triple H performed a Piledriver on The Rock to make the score 3–1. The Rock performed a DDT on Triple H to make the score 3–2. Triple H was disqualified for attacking The Rock with a steel chair, making the score 3–3. Triple H immediately pinned The Rock using the ropes for leverage to make the score 4–3. The Rock passed out to a Sleeper Hold by Triple H, causing a TKO and making the score 5–3. Triple H was counted out after The Rock performed a Pedigree on an announce table to Triple H, making the score 5–4. The Rock performed a People's Elbow on Triple H to make the score 5–5. After Road Dogg and X-Pac interfered, The Undertaker would make his return from injury, debuting his "American Badass" gimmick, and attacked Road Dogg, X-Pac, Shane McMahon, and Vince McMahon. The Undertaker attacked Triple H with a Chokeslam and a Tombstone Piledriver as the time limit expired. The Rock was disqualified for The Undertaker's interference, so this meant Triple H won the match 6–5 and the title.

== Reception ==
In 2019, Kevin Pantoja of 411Mania gave the event a rating of 9.0 [Amazing], stating, "When this company is on a roll, they can deliver something special. Following a stellar Backlash event, they gave us this gem. The Tables and Falls Count Anywhere matches are the worst things on the show and even they had enjoyable moments. The opener is hot, the European Title match is fun, the IC Title is fantastic, and the main event is the second best hour Ironman match I've ever seen. The show is paced well, with everything moving along smoothly. It's so good".

== Aftermath ==
The Rock continued his feud with Triple H, who now had to also contend with The Undertaker and the also returning Kane. They all wanted the title, but had problems thanks to The McMahon-Helmsley Regime using their corruption against each other to their advantage. To solve this, Linda decides to plan a Six-Man tag team match at King of the Ring the next month featuring The Rock, The Undertaker, and Kane against Triple H, Vince McMahon, and Shane McMahon where if any member of Triple H's team was pinned, whoever scored the fall would win the WWF Championship. The Rock won the match for his team by pinning Vince McMahon.

DX and the Dudley Boyz continued their feud at King of the Ring as well, with a Table/Dumpster match. DX won the match, but Bubba Ray got his revenge on Tori by putting her through a table.

Less than a week before King of the Ring, Chris Benoit would lose the Intercontinental Championship to Rikishi. Edge and Christian would lose the WWF Tag Team Championship to Too Cool but would regain them at King of the Ring. Crash Holly would regain the Hardcore Championship from Gerald Brisco, but would lose it back to him right before King of the Ring. Brisco would lose the title to Pat Patterson, starting a brief feud between the two.

== Results ==
No.	Results	Stipulations	Times
1	Too Cool (Grand Master Sexay, Rikishi, and Scotty 2 Hotty) defeated Team ECK (Edge, Christian, and Kurt Angle) by pinfall	Six-man tag team match	9:47
2	Eddie Guerrero (c) (with Chyna) defeated Dean Malenko and Perry Saturn by pinfall	Triple threat match for the WWF European Championship	7:56
3	Shane McMahon defeated Big Show by pinfall	Falls Count Anywhere match	7:11
4	Chris Benoit (c) defeated Chris Jericho by technical submission (Note: Chris Jericho passed out from Benoit’s crossface submission, therefore not losing by tap out)	Submission match for the WWF Intercontinental Championship	13:22
5	D-Generation X (Road Dogg and X-Pac) (with Tori) defeated The Dudley Boyz (Bubba Ray Dudley and D-Von Dudley)	Tag team tables match	10:55
6	Triple H (with Shane McMahon, Stephanie McMahon-Helmsley, and Mr. McMahon) defeated The Rock (c) 6–5	60-minute Iron Man match for the WWF Championship; Shawn Michaels was the special guest referee	1:00:00
(c) / – the champion(s) heading into the match

=== Iron Man match ===
Score		Point winner	Decision	Notes	Time
The Rock	Triple H	Point winner	Decision	Notes	Time
1	0	The Rock	Pinfall	The Rock pinned Triple H after the Rock Bottom	10:42
1	1	Triple H	Pinfall	Triple H pinned The Rock after the Pedigree	25:26
1	2	Triple H	Pinfall	Triple H pinned The Rock with an inside cradle	26:26
1	3	Triple H	Pinfall	Triple H pinned The Rock after a piledriver	32:22
2	3	The Rock	Pinfall	The Rock pinned Triple H after a float-over DDT	40:33
3	3	The Rock	Disqualification	Triple H was disqualified after attacking The Rock with a steel chair	43:30
3	4	Triple H	Pinfall	Triple H pinned The Rock while using the ropes for leverage	44:06
3	5	Triple H	Technical Submission	Triple H made The Rock pass out in a sleeper hold	47:25
4	5	The Rock	Countout	Triple H was counted out after The Rock hit the Pedigree on a broadcast table	56:05
5	5	The Rock	Pinfall	The Rock pinned Triple H after the People's Elbow	57:59
5	6	Triple H	Disqualification	The Rock was disqualified after The Undertaker attacked Triple H with a chokeslam and a Tombstone Piledriver	1:00:00
