= No Mercy (2000) =

World Wrestling Federation pay-per-view event

- Promotional poster featuring Triple H
- Promotion: World Wrestling Federation
- Date: October 22, 2000
- City: Albany, New York
- Venue: Pepsi Arena
- Attendance: 14,342
- Buy rate: 550,000

Pay-per-view chronology
← Previous; Unforgiven	Next → Survivor Series

No Mercy chronology
← Previous; 1999 (US)	Next → 2001

The 2000 No Mercy was a professional wrestling pay-per-view (PPV) event produced by the World Wrestling Federation (WWF, now WWE). It was the third No Mercy and took place on October 22, 2000, at the Pepsi Arena in Albany, New York.

The main event was a No Disqualification match for the WWF Championship. The Rock defended the title against Kurt Angle. Angle pinned Rock after an Angle Slam to win the title. The other main match was a No Holds Barred Match between the returning "Stone Cold" Steve Austin, and Rikishi.

The undercard featured Triple H versus Chris Benoit, The Hardy Boyz (Jeff Hardy and Matt Hardy) versus Los Conquistadores (Uno and Dos) for the WWF Tag Team Championship, William Regal versus Naked Mideon for the WWF European Championship, Right to Censor (Val Venis and Steven Richards) versus Chyna and Billy Gunn in a tag team match, Chris Jericho versus X-Pac in a Steel cage match, Acolytes Protection Agency (Bradshaw and Faarooq) and Lita versus T & A (Test and Albert) and Trish Stratus in a six-person mixed tag team match, and a Dudley Boyz (Bubba Ray Dudley and D-Von Dudley) Invitational Tables match.

== Production ==
=== Background ===
No Mercy was first held by the World Wrestling Federation (WWF, now WWE) as a United Kingdom-exclusive professional wrestling pay-per-view (PPV) event in May 1999. A second No Mercy was then held later that same year in October, but in the United States. A third event was then scheduled to be held on October 22, 2000, at the Pepsi Arena in Albany, New York. This third event in turn established No Mercy as the annual October PPV for the WWF.

=== Storylines ===
No Mercy featured professional wrestling matches that involved different wrestlers from pre-existing feuds, plots, and storylines that were played out on Raw is War, and SmackDown!—the WWF's television programs.

Two predominant rivalries heading into No Mercy were created at the same time. The one was between The Rock, and Kurt Angle for the WWF Championship, and the other was between Triple H, and Chris Benoit. At Unforgiven, Triple H defeated Angle in a No Disqualification match, and Rock retained the WWF Championship against Benoit, The Undertaker, and Kane in a Fatal Four-Way match. On the September 28 edition of SmackDown!, Angle, and Benoit defeated Rock, and Triple H in a tag team match. On the October 2 edition of Raw is War, Benoit helped Angle in defeating Triple H to become the number one contender for the WWF title at No Mercy. As a result, Triple H, and Benoit began feuding. On the October 9 edition of Raw is War, the WWF Commissioner Mick Foley announced that Triple H would wrestle Benoit at No Mercy.

Another predominant storyline heading into the event was over the attacker of "Stone Cold" Steve Austin as Austin continued his search for his attacker at Survivor Series. On the October 9 episode of Raw is War, Rikishi revealed that he had run down Austin with the car in the parking lot, and he did it for The Rock; because WWF always held back the Samoans. On the October 12 episode of SmackDown!, Commissioner Mick Foley announced that Austin and Rikishi would wrestle in a No Holds Barred match at No Mercy.

At Unforgiven, Hardy Boyz (Matt Hardy and Jeff Hardy) defeated Edge and Christian in a Steel Cage match to win the WWF Tag Team Championship. The next night on Raw is War, Hardy Boyz defeated Edge and Christian in a Ladder match to retain the titles and the WWF Commissioner Mick Foley had stipulated before the match that it would be Edge and Christian's last title shot if they lost. On the October 9 episode of Raw is War, Edge and Christian interfered under the disguise of Los Conquistadores in Hardy Boyz' Tag Team Championship defense against Tazz and Raven but failed in preventing Hardy Boyz from winning the match. A week later on SmackDown!, Los Conquistadores won a tag team Battle Royal, last eliminating Dudley Boyz (Bubba Ray Dudley and D-Von Dudley) to become the number one contenders for the Tag Team Championship at No Mercy.

On the October 15 episode of Sunday Night Heat, Acolytes Protection Agency (Faarooq and Bradshaw) were playing cards with T & A (Test and Albert) in a backstage segment. T & A were losing in the game and even lost their entire money but continued to play the game until their manager Trish Stratus entered and had a deal that if T & A lost one game, she would remove one portion of her clothes. It continued until she was forced to remove her bra. APA won another game but before Stratus could remove one more part, T & A attacked APA. On the October 19 episode of SmackDown!, Lita defended the WWF Women's Championship against Stratus. T & A interfered in the match and helped Stratus in attacking Lita, leading to APA making a run-in and rescuing Lita. This led to a six-person mixed tag team match pitting Lita and Acolytes against Stratus and T & A.

On the September 25 episode of Raw is War, Chyna started celebrating her posing for Playboy magazine. However, her celebration was cut short by Right to Censor (Stevie Richards, Val Venis, The Goodfather and Bull Buchanan), a faction that was against the nudity of female wrestlers of WWF. On the September 28 episode of SmackDown!, Chyna stripped to her bra and panties and defeated Richards in a singles match. On the October 9 episode of Raw is War, Chyna and her on-screen boyfriend, the WWF Intercontinental Champion Eddie Guerrero took on Richards and Venis in a tag team match. During the match, a video was played on the titantron showing Guerrero having a shower with two of The Godfather's hos. This distracted Chyna and she started crying while Venis pinned Guerrero for the victory. After the match, Right to Censor attempted to attack Chyna until Billy Gunn made the rescue. On the October 16 episode of Raw is War, the WWF Commissioner Mick Foley announced that Guerrero would defend the Intercontinental Championship against Mr. Ass at No Mercy. On the October 19 episode of SmackDown!, Guerrero finally broke away from Chyna by choking her with his crutch after Right to Censor attacked her. Mr. Ass came out to rescue Chyna but was attacked by Right to Censor. On the October 22 episode of Sunday Night Heat, the Commissioner Mick Foley announced that Guerrero could not wrestle on the pay-per-view, due to injury and pitted Mr. Ass and Chyna against Richards and Venis later that night at No Mercy.

At Unforgiven, Chris Jericho defeated X-Pac. The following night on Raw is War, X-Pac defeated Jericho in a First Blood match but Jericho attacked X-Pac after the match and forced him to submit to his submission maneuver, Walls of Jericho. On the September 28 episode of SmackDown!, X-Pac attacked Jericho during his tag team match with Jerry Lawler against Tazz and Raven. Jericho and X-Pac continued their rivalry and competed in several tag team matches with different partners, leading to a Steel Cage match between the two at No Mercy.

== Event ==
Other on-screen personnel
Role:	Name:
English commentators	Jim Ross
English commentators	Jerry Lawler
Spanish commentators	Carlos Cabrera
Spanish commentators	Hugo Savinovich
Interviewer	Kevin Kelly
Ring announcer	Howard Finkel
Referees	Mike Chioda
Referees	Jim Korderas
Referees	Earl Hebner
Referees	Jack Doan
Referees	Tim White

=== Preliminary matches ===
As the event commenced, the first match that aired was a Dudley Boyz (Bubba Ray Dudley and D-Von Dudley) Invitational Tables match. The match was an open invitation to any tag team in the WWF. The match stipulated that a team would be eliminated if one of its members got knocked through a table. The first two teams were Lo Down (Chaz and D'Lo Brown), and Too Cool (Scotty 2 Hotty and Grand Master Sexay). Brown hit Sexay, put him on the table, and attempted to hit his finisher, a Lo Down on Sexay through the table, but Sexay moved out of the way, and Brown went through the table. As a result, Lo Down was eliminated. Tazz, and Raven were the next participants. They eliminated Too Cool when they double suplexed Scotty through a table. Dudley Boyz entered next, and eliminated Tazz, and Raven when D-Von delivered a Leg Drop from the top rope on Tazz, who was lying on the table. As a result, Tazz went through a table, and he and Raven were eliminated. Next was Right to Censor (The Goodfather and Bull Buchanan), the final team to enter the match. Dudley Boyz had won the match when Bubba Ray powerbombed Buchanan through a table but the referee was knocked out. This allowed Goodfather to nail Bubba with a chair. Goodfather positioned Bubba on the broken table and the referee got up. He thought that Bubba had been driven through the table, so he awarded Right to Censor, the victory but another referee came in and told the referee the actual story. As a result, the match continued and Dudley Boyz performed a 3D on Goodfather through a table, thus eliminating Right to Censor and winning the match in the process.

The next scheduled match was a six-person mixed tag team match pitting Acolytes Protection Agency (Bradshaw and Faarooq) and Lita against T & A (Test and Albert) and their manager Trish Stratus. APA was attacked by T & A backstage before they had a chance to make their entrance. On the other hand, Lita, who was already in the ring, was attacked by Stratus and T & A until the Hardy Boyz (Jeff Hardy and Matt Hardy) made the rescue and prevented T & A and Stratus from attacking Lita. The match never took place.

The third match was a Steel Cage match between Chris Jericho and X-Pac. Jericho Superbombed X-Pac from the top rope. However, X-Pac recovered and tried to climb out of the cage. Jericho also climbed up and caught X-Pac and applied the Walls of Jericho on the top of the cage. X-Pac managed to break the hold. He tried to climb out of the cage and when he reached the top of the cage, Jericho dropkicked X-Pac crotch first on the cage door. This caused X-Pac to lose balance and crash down the ring. Jericho took advantage of the situation and climbed out of the cage and escaped it to win the match.

The fourth match was a tag team match pitting Right to Censor (Steven Richards and Val Venis) against Chyna and Billy Gunn. Both teams exchanged momentum over each other throughout the match until Billy Gunn started to dominate the match. However, the other members of Right to Censor distracted Billy Gunn. Eddie Guerrero interfered on behalf of Richards and Venis and nailed Chyna with a bouquet of roses, which had a lead pipe attached to them. Venis pinned Chyna to win the match.

Next was a No Holds Barred match between Rikishi and "Stone Cold" Steve Austin. Austin initially did not appear for the match and was nowhere to be seen in the arena. Rikishi demanded that the Commissioner Mick Foley declare him the winner by forfeit but Austin entered the arena in his truck and drove it to the ring and entered the ring to start the match. Austin viciously attacked Rikishi and nailed him with several chair shots. Rikishi bled from his face but Austin continued to attack him and sent him into the back of his truck. He closed the truck and sat in it and drove the truck out of the arena. After reaching the parking lot of the arena, Austin dragged Rikishi out of the truck and tried to run him down with it but a police car came in the way to rescue Rikishi. Many police cars came in afterwards and Austin was arrested for trying to run down Rikishi with the truck. As a result, the match resulted in a no-contest.

In the sixth match, William Regal defended the WWF European Championship against Naked Mideon. Regal complained to Commissioner Mick Foley that he would not defend the title against a naked opponent. Foley ordered Mideon to wear attire for the match. However, as the match started, Mideon stripped off his clothes later on and dominated a disgusted Regal for much of the match. At the end of the match, Mideon climbed to the top rope but Regal knocked him down. Regal tried to apply a Regal Stretch on Mideon but eventually hit him with a Regal Cutter to win the match and thus retain the European Championship.

=== Main event matches ===
The seventh match of the event pitted Hardy Boyz (Matt Hardy and Jeff Hardy) defending the WWF Tag Team Championship against Los Conquistadores (Uno and Dos). Los Conquistadores were actually Edge and Christian in masks. Edge was wrestling as Conquistador Uno and Christian was wrestling as Conquistador Dos. As the match started, Hardy Boyz tried to pull off Conquistadores' masks but failed. One of the Conquistadores nearly had Matt pinned until Jeff performed a Swanton Bomb on Conquistador Dos. However, Conquistador Uno tossed Jeff out of the ring. Matt took advantage and hit Conquistador Uno with a Twist of Fate and pulled off his mask to reveal another mask. Matt pulled off that mask until Conquistador Dos took advantage and gave Matt an Unprettier to win the Tag Team Championships.

The final match on the undercard was between Triple H and Chris Benoit. As the match started, Triple H started attacking Benoit's injured left knee until injuring his left arm. Benoit started attacking Triple H's injured arm and performed a diving headbutt on the arm. The match went back and forth with Benoit working on Triple H's injured arm. He eventually applied a Crippler Crossface on Triple H. Triple H stood up after a while and got out of the move. Stephanie McMahon-Helmsley interfered in the match and slapped Benoit. McMahon distracted the referee, allowing Triple H to hit Benoit with a Low Blow. He followed it with a Pedigree to pin Benoit for the victory.

In the main event, The Rock defended the WWF Championship against Kurt Angle in a No Disqualification match. Stephanie took advantage of the stipulations and started attacking The Rock. However, The Rock earned momentum and applied a Sharpshooter on Angle. Angle tapped out to the hold but the referee was distracted by Stephanie. Stephanie continued to interfere on Angle's behalf but The Rock dominated Angle for much of the match until Angle hit The Rock with the WWF Championship belt. Both men started bleeding. However, The Rock recovered and hit Angle with a Spinebuster. The Rock tried to hit a People's Elbow but Stephanie entered the ring. This angered The Rock and he performed a Rock Bottom on Stephanie. The Rock tried to hit a People's Elbow on Stephanie but Angle interrupted and prevented The Rock from hitting the move. Triple H interfered in the match as he tossed Angle out of the ring, hit The Rock with a Pedigree, and carried Stephanie backstage. Angle and The Rock continued to battle each other until an injured Rikishi interfered in the match on The Rock's behalf. Rikishi started attacking Angle. The Rock and Angle returned to the ring where The Rock hit Angle with a Rock Bottom and attempted a pinfall but Angle kicked out at 2. Rikishi tried to do a splash on Angle in the ring but The Rock was also splashed. Rikishi tried to hit a Savate Kick on Angle but accidentally hit The Rock with it. Rikishi tried to perform another Savate Kick on Angle but Angle ducked and performed an Angle Slam on Rikishi. Angle focused on a knocked out The Rock and delivered him an Angle Slam to win the match and thus became the new WWF Champion.

== Reception ==
No Mercy 2000 received 550,000 buys, up from the 327,000 buys received by No Mercy 1999. The main event match between Kurt Angle, and The Rock was the highest rated match of the night, rated 4.25 stars out of 5 by Dave Meltzer of the Wrestling Observer Newsletter. As for the other matches, Triple H vs. Chris Benoit was rated 4 stars, the Steel Cage Match was rated 3.5 stars, and the No Holds Barred Match between Steve Austin, and Rikishi received 2.25 stars. The European Championship match received a dismal rating of -0.5 stars.

== Aftermath ==
The next night on Raw is War, Rikishi apologized to The Rock for costing him the WWF Championship against Kurt Angle at No Mercy, and told him that it was just accidental, but The Rock did not forgive Rikishi. On the October 26 episode of SmackDown!, "Stone Cold" Steve Austin was hit with a wrench as he headed to the ring to attack Rikishi after Rikishi's Handicap match with Too Cool (Scotty 2 Hotty and Grand Master Sexay). However, Austin managed to make it to the ring, but was assaulted by Rikishi. On the October 30 episode of Raw is War, Austin defeated Rikishi in a No Mercy rematch contested inside a steel cage. Later that night, Rikishi attacked The Rock after The Rock won his number one contender's match against Chris Jericho. Following the assault, Rikishi revealed that The Rock knew about the attack, and had given Rikishi the keys to the truck to run down Austin at the previous year's Survivor Series event. On the November 2 episode of SmackDown!, Rikishi cost The Rock a title shot for the WWF Championship against Kurt Angle. On the November 9 episode of SmackDown!, the WWF Commissioner Mick Foley announced that Rikishi, and The Rock would wrestle in a match at Survivor Series, which The Rock won.

On the other hand, Austin took on Angle, and Rikishi in a Handicap match on the November 6 episode of Raw is War. Angle and Rikishi assaulted Austin throughout the match until Triple H interfered to rescue Austin by forcing Angle and Rikishi to retreat. Triple H followed by assaulting Austin with a sledgehammer and thus was revealed to be the mastermind behind Austin's attack at Survivor Series. As a result, on the November 9 episode of SmackDown!, Mick Foley announced that Triple H would wrestle Austin at Survivor Series. The match would become a No Disqualification match. It resulted in a no contest when Triple H tried to run down Austin with his car but Austin picked up the car and dropped it on the concrete floor.

On the November 9 episode of SmackDown!, The Undertaker defeated Chris Jericho, Kane and Chris Benoit in a Fatal Four-Way match to become the number one contender for the WWF Championship at Survivor Series. At Survivor Series, Kurt Angle defeated The Undertaker to retain the title, after interference by his legitimate brother Eric Angle.

The next night on Raw is War, The Hardy Boyz dressed as the Los Conquistadores defeated Edge in a handicap match after Christian was taken out backstage to regain the WWF Tag Team Championship.

== Results ==
No.	Results	Stipulations	Times
1	Dudley Boyz (Bubba Ray Dudley and D-Von Dudley) won by last eliminating Right to Censor (The Goodfather and Bull Buchanan)	Dudley Boyz Invitational Tables match	12:18
2	Chris Jericho defeated X-Pac	Steel Cage match	10:40
3	Right to Censor (Steven Richards and Val Venis) defeated Chyna and Billy Gunn	Tag team match	7:10
4	"Stone Cold" Steve Austin vs. Rikishi ended in a no contest	No Holds Barred match	10:30
5	William Regal (c) defeated Naked Mideon	Singles match for the WWF European Championship	6:02
6	Los Conquistadores (Uno and Dos) defeated The Hardy Boyz (Matt Hardy and Jeff Hardy) (c)	Tag team match for the WWF Tag Team Championship	10:58
7	Triple H defeated Chris Benoit	Singles match	18:44
8	Kurt Angle (with Stephanie McMahon-Helmsley) defeated The Rock (c)	No Disqualification match for the WWF Championship	21:45
(c) / – the champion(s) heading into the match

Gauntlet match

Elimination	Team	Eliminated by	Time
1	Lo Down (Chaz and D'Lo Brown)	Too Cool (Grand Master Sexay and Scotty 2 Hotty)	3:54
2	Too Cool	Raven and Tazz	7:10
3	Tazz and Raven	Dudley Boyz (Bubba Ray Dudley and D-Von Dudley)	9:18
4	Right to Censor (The Goodfather and Bull Buchanan)	The Dudley Boyz	12:18
Winner:	The Dudley Boyz		
