= T & A (professional wrestling) =

Professional wrestling tag team

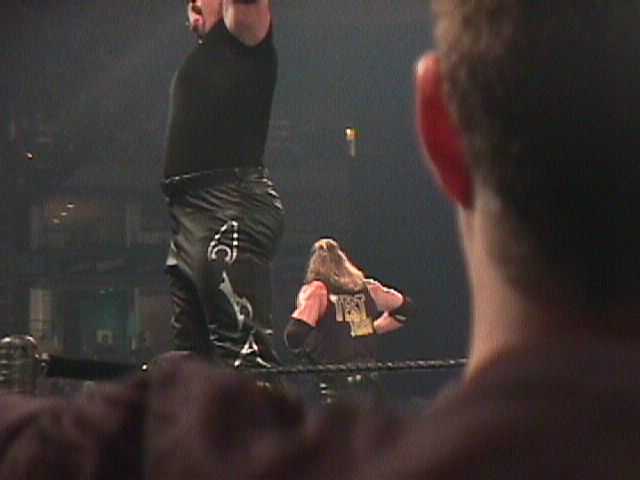
- Test and Albert in a 2000 match.

Tag team
- Name(s): Test & Albert (T & A); Test & Albert Protection Agency (T & A PA)
- Members: Test; Albert; Trish Stratus (manager)
- Billed heights: Test: 6 ft 6 in (1.98 m); Albert: 6 ft 7 in (2.01 m)
- Combined billed weight: 630 lb (290 kg)
- Debut: March 30, 2000
- Disbanded: December 28, 2000
- Trained by: Funkin' Conservatory; Dory Funk Jr.

T & A was a professional wrestling tag team in the World Wrestling Federation (WWF), consisting of Test and Albert. T & A had Trish Stratus as their team manager, with their name being a pun on the initials of the two wrestlers and the slang expression "T&A" (referring to tits and ass), spawning numerous coarse jokes on fan's signs and from commentator Jerry Lawler in reference to the buxom Trish Stratus.

== History ==
Test and Albert met in Dory Funk Jr.'s training center, the Funkin' Conservatory, where they were trained. Following this, both men took on individual careers in the business leading them to the WWF, where they were repackaged as a tag team during 2000. On the March 19, 2000, episode of Sunday Night Heat Stratus made her debut with the gimmick of scouting wrestlers to form a team. Shortly after this, Test and Albert (who both wrestled on that show) became her wards. Their first match as a team was on the March 30 episode of SmackDown!, when they lost to the Hardy Boyz. Their first pay-per-view match was at WrestleMania 2000 on April 2, when they defeated Steve Blackman and Al Snow. They competed against established teams in the WWF's tag team division, including Road Dogg and X-Pac, The Godfather and D'Lo Brown, and Holly Cousins, before beginning a feud with the Dudley Boyz. In a match against the Dudley Boyz at Backlash on April 30, Stratus was the recipient of a powerbomb through a table from Bubba Ray Dudley, although T & A won the match.

They continued competing against teams including the Hardy Boyz and the Dudley Boyz for the next few months, and on June 25, they competed for the WWF Tag Team Championship in a four-way elimination match at King of the Ring, but were the first team eliminated after Matt Hardy pinned Test. Test, Albert and Stratus began a feud with the Hardy Boyz, Matt and Jeff, and their manager Lita, which led to a six-person intergender tag team match at Fully Loaded on July 23, which T & A lost when Lita pinned Stratus.

During a feud with the Acolytes Protection Agency (APA), the two men parodied the team under the name T & APA (Test & Albert Protection Agency). As part of this feud, all three members of T & A were supposed to face Bradshaw and Faarooq of the APA and Lita in a six-person tag team match on October 22, at the No Mercy pay-per-view, but T & A attacked the APA backstage, so the match never started. They then attacked Lita at ringside until the Hardy Boyz saved her.

A feud with Holly Cousins (Hardcore, Crash and Molly) followed, and at Survivor Series on November 19, the Holly Cousins, with Steve Blackman replacing Hardcore, defeated T & A in a six-person match when Molly pinned Stratus.

In December 2000, Albert turned on Test, causing storyline internal injuries which resulted in bleeding from Test's mouth. Trish continued to manage Albert for a while, but eventually began a storyline involving Vince McMahon and eventually broke out as a wrestler on her own. Albert went on to join X-Pac and Justin Credible in their own stable, X-Factor. Test defeated William Regal to win the European title. He went on to feud with Eddie Guerrero over the European title before eventually joining The Alliance and later The Un-Americans.

Test was released in November 2004 and returned in June 2006 and left again in January 2007. He died on March 13, 2009, in his Florida apartment. Albert was renamed A-Train in 2002 and was later released in November 2004, but returned in March 2012 as Lord Tensai or just Tensai. He would become the head coach for the WWE developmental branch in August 2014 for NXT.
