= Jack Doan =

American professional wrestling referee

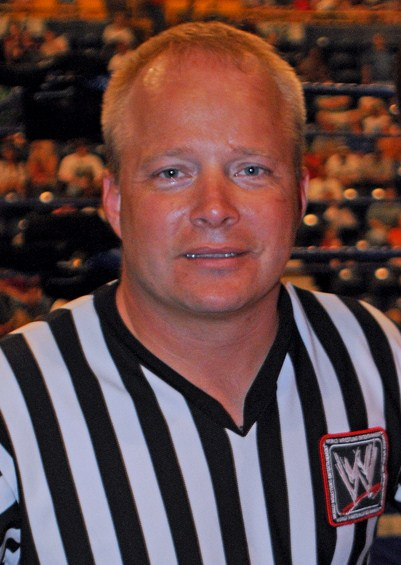
- Doan in 2009

Personal information
- Born: Jack Daniel Doan; June 12, 1972 (age 54) Danville, Illinois, U.S.

Professional wrestling career
- Ring name: Jack Doan
- Billed height: 5 ft 6.5 in (1.69 m)
- Billed weight: 190 lb (86 kg)
- Trained by: Earl Hebner
- Debut: 1991
- Retired: 2013

Jack Daniel Doan (born June 12, 1972) is an American veteran professional wrestling referee who worked with WWE from 1991 to 2013.

== Career ==
Doan joined WWE in October 1991 as a truck driver. From there, he took robes from Superstars at ringside, played music at shows, worked as part of the ring crew, and continued to drive the company's trucks from town to town. After a while, he became a part-time referee, immediately taking advantage of several opportunities to fill in whenever he could. Shortly after, Doan's referee status changed to full-time.

One of the more notable incidents in Doan's career came when he participated in an angle on the January 22, 1996 episode of Raw, where Vader made his World Wrestling Federation (WWF) television debut following his debut at the Royal Rumble the prior night. Vader punched Doan twice in the face, picked him up and power-bombed him to the mat. When on-screen WWF president Gorilla Monsoon intervened, Monsoon picked Doan up off the mat and placed him in the corner. While Monsoon tended to the wounded official, Vader avalanched both of them, kayfabe knocking Doan into unconsciousness. He was out of action for several weeks, selling the injuries he received at the hands of Vader, but eventually reappeared at WrestleMania XII, refereeing another Vader match.

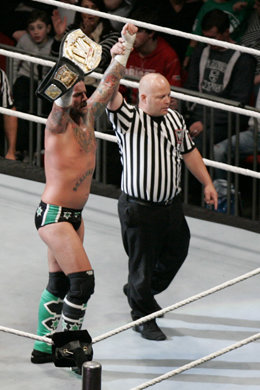
Doan with the WWE Champion, CM Punk in 2012.

Doan was out of action for about a month with legit stretched ligaments in his knee after Gigolo Jimmy Del Ray, one half of The Heavenly Bodies, accidentally clipped him during a tag match. Doan also suffered a concussion at the 1998 Royal Rumble when Phineas Godwinn was thrown over the top rope and inadvertently kicked him in the back of the head. The Legion of Doom performed a Doomsday Device on Doan at In Your House: Unforgiven 1998.

During The Invasion, he bickered with Alliance referee Charles Robinson.

During the 24/7 ruling of the WWE Hardcore Title where anyone could challenge the champion any time and anywhere, Doan attempted to beat Crash Holly in an impromptu match to win the belt, and went as far as to remove his referee's shirt and persuade fellow referee Jimmy Korderas to count the fall. His attempt, however, was unsuccessful.

On a July 2007 episode of Raw, Doan took the microphone from Santino Marella and made a match between him and Umaga, who had just made his entrance during a promo being cut by Marella. Doan is also known for refereeing more diva matches than any other ref on Raw.

He was taken off the road in mid-summer 2007 with a shoulder injury that required surgery. He returned to television on January 21, 2008, officiating a Divas match. He reinjured the shoulder a few months later and returned to officiate Victoria's last match against Michelle McCool on January 16, 2009, episode of SmackDown. Doan was released by WWE in March 2013 and was the second longest tenured referee on the WWE roster at that time behind Mike Chioda.
