= WWE Judgment Day (2007) =

World Wrestling Entertainment pay-per-view event

Judgment Day
- Promotional poster featuring Kane
- Promotion: World Wrestling Entertainment
- Brand(s): Raw; SmackDown! ECW
- Date: May 20, 2007
- City: St. Louis, Missouri
- Venue: Scottrade Center
- Attendance: 10,500
- Buy rate: 242,000

Pay-per-view chronology
← Previous; Backlash	Next → One Night Stand

Judgment Day chronology
← Previous; 2006	Next → 2008

The 2007 Judgment Day was a professional wrestling pay-per-view (PPV) event produced by World Wrestling Entertainment (WWE). It was the ninth Judgment Day and took place on May 20, 2007, at the Scottrade Center in St. Louis, Missouri, United States, held for wrestlers from the promotion's Raw, SmackDown!, and ECW brand divisions. This was the first Judgment Day since 2003 to feature multiple brands after WWE discontinued brand-exclusive PPVs following WrestleMania 23 the prior month, also making it the first Judgment Day to feature ECW, which was introduced as a third brand in May 2006.

The main match on the Raw brand, which was the card's main event, was John Cena versus The Great Khali for the WWE Championship, which Cena won after forcing Khali to submit to the STFU. The featured match on the SmackDown! brand was Edge versus Batista for the World Heavyweight Championship, which Edge won via pinfall with a school boy pin. The primary match on the ECW brand was a handicap match for the ECW World Championship between Team McMahon (champion Vince McMahon, Shane McMahon, and Umaga) and Bobby Lashley. Lashley won the match by pinning Shane; however, he did not win the title since he did not pin defending champion Vince.

== Production ==
=== Background ===
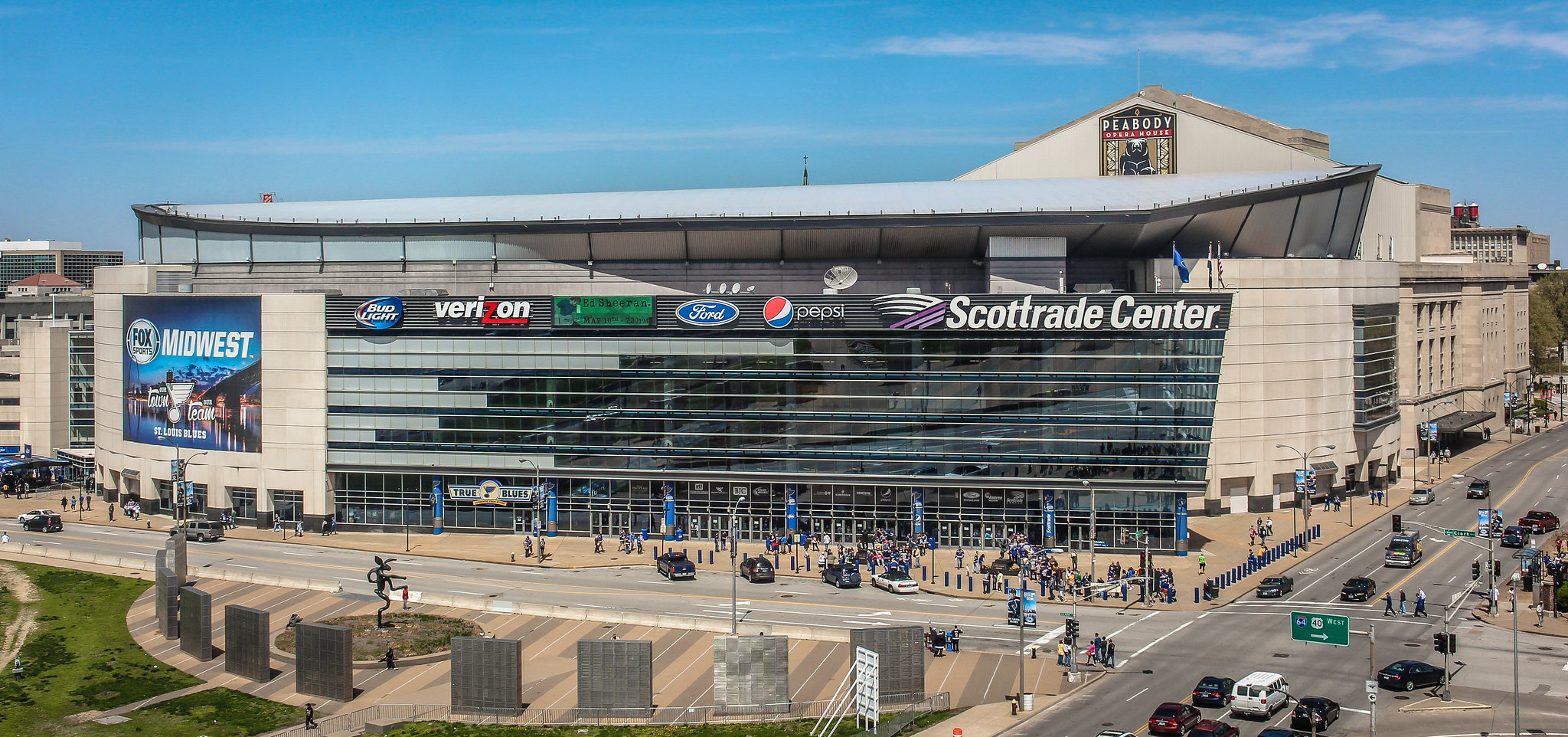
The ninth Judgment Day was held at the Scottrade Center in St. Louis, Missouri.

Judgment Day was a professional wrestling pay-per-view (PPV) event first held by World Wrestling Entertainment (WWE) as the 25th In Your House PPV event in October 1998. Following the discontinuation of the In Your House series in February 1999, Judgment Day was reinstated in May 2000 as its own PPV event, establishing Judgment Day as the promotion's annual May PPV. The ninth event was held on May 20, 2007, at the Scottrade Center in St. Louis, Missouri.

While the previous three years's events exclusively featured wrestlers from the SmackDown! brand, the 2007 event featured wrestlers from the Raw, SmackDown!, and ECW brands, as following WrestleMania 23 the prior month, brand-exclusive pay-per-views were discontinued. This in turn made it the first Judgment Day since 2003 to feature multiple brands as well as the first Judgment Day to feature ECW, which was introduced as a third brand in May 2006.

=== Storylines ===
The event included matches that resulted from scripted storylines. Results were predetermined by WWE's writers on the Raw, SmackDown!, and ECW brands, while storylines were produced on WWE's weekly television shows, Raw, SmackDown!, and ECW.

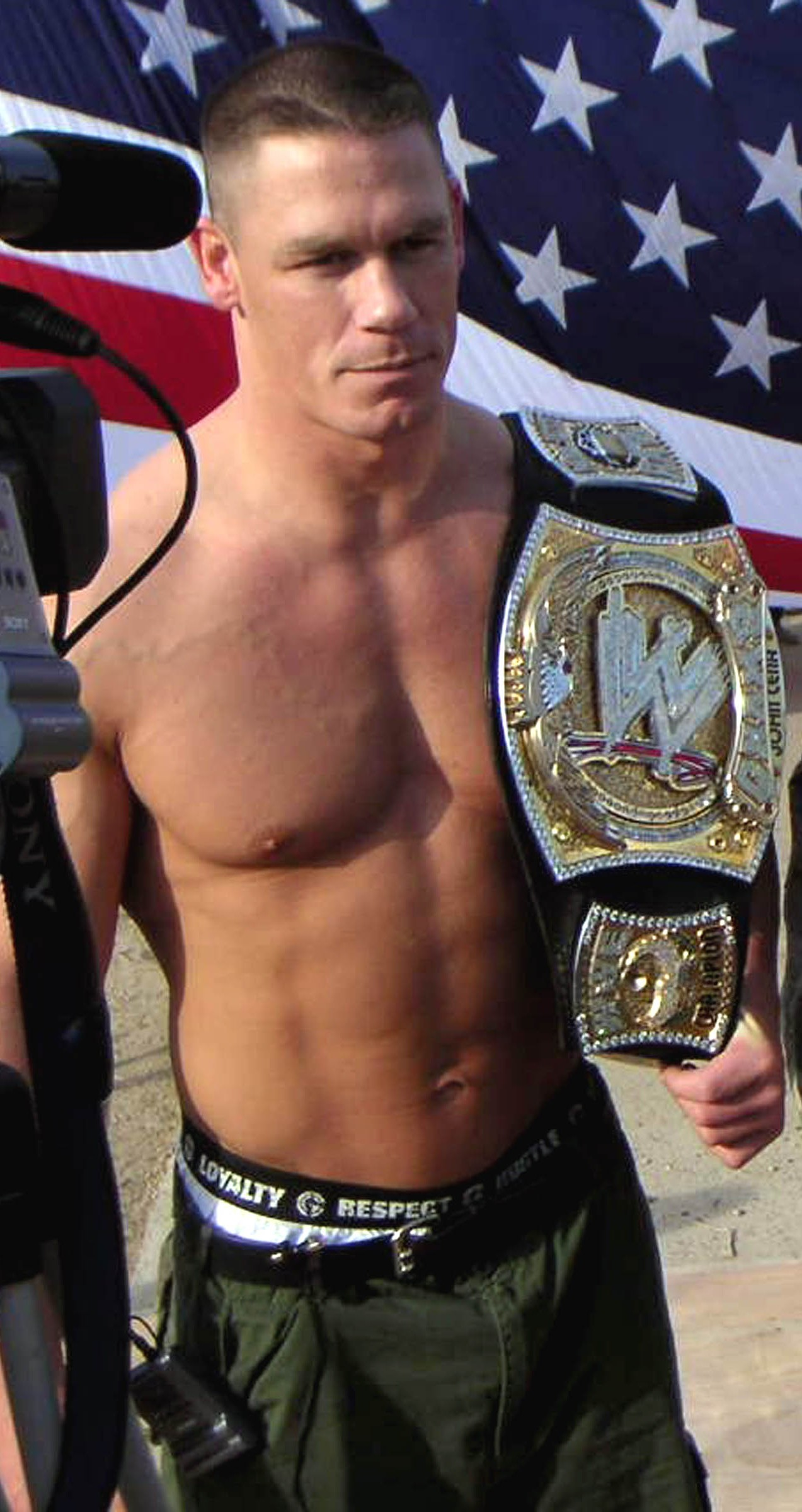
John Cena in his third WWE Championship reign, which at the time was Raw's world championship.

The main feud heading into Judgment Day on the Raw brand was between John Cena and The Great Khali, with the two battling over the WWE Championship. The rivalry started on the April 30 episode of Raw during a non-title match between John Cena and Shawn Michaels when Michaels was attacked from behind by The Great Khali. Edge and Randy Orton were also knocked out by Khali. The Great Khali then performed a Khali Bomb on Cena. The following week, Khali defeated Michaels in a number one contenders match by knockout after executing the Khali Bomb on Michaels through the announce table. Later that night, Khali stole Cena's WWE title belt. On the May 14 episode of Raw, when Cena attempted to take his belt back, Khali attacked him.

The predominant feud on the SmackDown! brand was between Edge and Batista, with the two feuding over the World Heavyweight Championship. The feud started on the May 11 episode of SmackDown! when Batista challenged The Undertaker for the World Heavyweight Championship in a Steel Cage match. Both men escaped the steel cage at the same time, thus ending in a draw. After the match, Mark Henry made his return and attacked The Undertaker. Edge then defeated The Undertaker for the World Heavyweight Championship after cashing in his Money in the Bank contract, which is used to receive a title match of the owner's time and place of choosing. On the May 18 episode of SmackDown!, Batista confronted Edge and challenged him to a match for the World Heavyweight Championship at Judgment Day.

The primary feud on the ECW brand was between Team McMahon (Vince McMahon, Shane McMahon, and Umaga) and Bobby Lashley, with Vince and Lashley feuding over the ECW World Championship. Lashley had represented Donald Trump in the "Battle of the Billionaires" and defeated Vince's representative Umaga, thus becoming a rival of the McMahons. The McMahons and Umaga defeated Lashley in a three-on-one handicap match to allow Vince to win the ECW World Championship. Lashley demanded a rematch for the ECW World Championship, and Vince booked himself, Umaga, and Shane in another three-on-one handicap rematch against Lashley for the ECW title.

== Event ==
Other on-screen personnel
Role:	Name:
English commentators	Jim Ross (Raw)
English commentators	Jerry Lawler (Raw)
English commentators	Michael Cole (SmackDown!)
English commentators	John "Bradshaw" Layfield (SmackDown!)
English commentators	Joey Styles (ECW)
English commentators	Tazz (ECW)
Spanish commentators	Carlos Cabrera
Spanish commentators	Hugo Savinovich
Interviewers	Todd Grisham
Interviewers	Kristal Marshall
Ring announcers	Justin Roberts (Raw/ECW)
Ring announcers	Tony Chimel (SmackDown!)
Referees	Charles Robinson
Referees	Mike Chioda
Referees	Chad Patton
Referees	John Cone
Referees	Mickie Henson
Referees	Marty Elias
Referees	Jack Doan
Referees	Scott Armstrong

Before the broadcast began, Kane defeated William Regal in a dark match.

=== Preliminary matches ===
The first televised match was between Ric Flair and Carlito. Carlito controlled most of the match, as he attacked and applied various submissions on Flair's arm. After reversing a Back Stabber, Flair forced Carlito to submit with the figure-four leglock to win the match.

The next match on the card was between Bobby Lashley and Team McMahon, comprising Vince McMahon (the ECW World Champion), Shane McMahon, and Umaga), for the ECW World Championship. Towards the end of the match, Lashley delivered a Dominator to Shane and pinned him for the win. Lashley was initially announced as the new ECW World Champion, but Vince declared that, since he had not been pinned, he was still the champion. Umaga then hit Lashley with a Samoan Spike.

The third match was between CM Punk and Elijah Burke. Throughout the match, the two exchanged many aerial maneuvers. Punk won the match by pinning Burke after performing a GTS (Go To Sleep).

The match between Randy Orton and Shawn Michaels followed. During an interview segment before the match, Orton attacked Michaels. Before the match began, Orton stood alone in the ring and declared himself the winner by forfeit. Michaels, however, appeared and came to the ring, although he showed signs of injury. Michaels came into the match with a legitimate knee injury. During the match, Orton tried to perform a superplex over the top turnbuckle, but Michaels used an eye rake and caused Orton to fall. Michaels followed up with a diving elbow drop and tried to execute Sweet Chin Music, but collapsed in the process. The referee declared Orton the winner as a result. After the match, Orton attacked Michaels again, causing a kayfabe career-threatening concussion.

Next was The Hardys (Matt Hardy and Jeff Hardy) versus Lance Cade and Trevor Murdoch for the World Tag Team Championship. Near the end of the match, Matt performed a Twist of Fate on Cade, which was followed by Jeff performing a Swanton Bomb. Jeff pinned Cade and The Hardys retained the World Tag Team Championship.

=== Main event matches ===
The next match was Edge versus Batista for the World Heavyweight Championship. Batista controlled most of the match and performed a spinebuster on Edge. Edge, however, pinned Batista with a schoolboy, retaining the title.

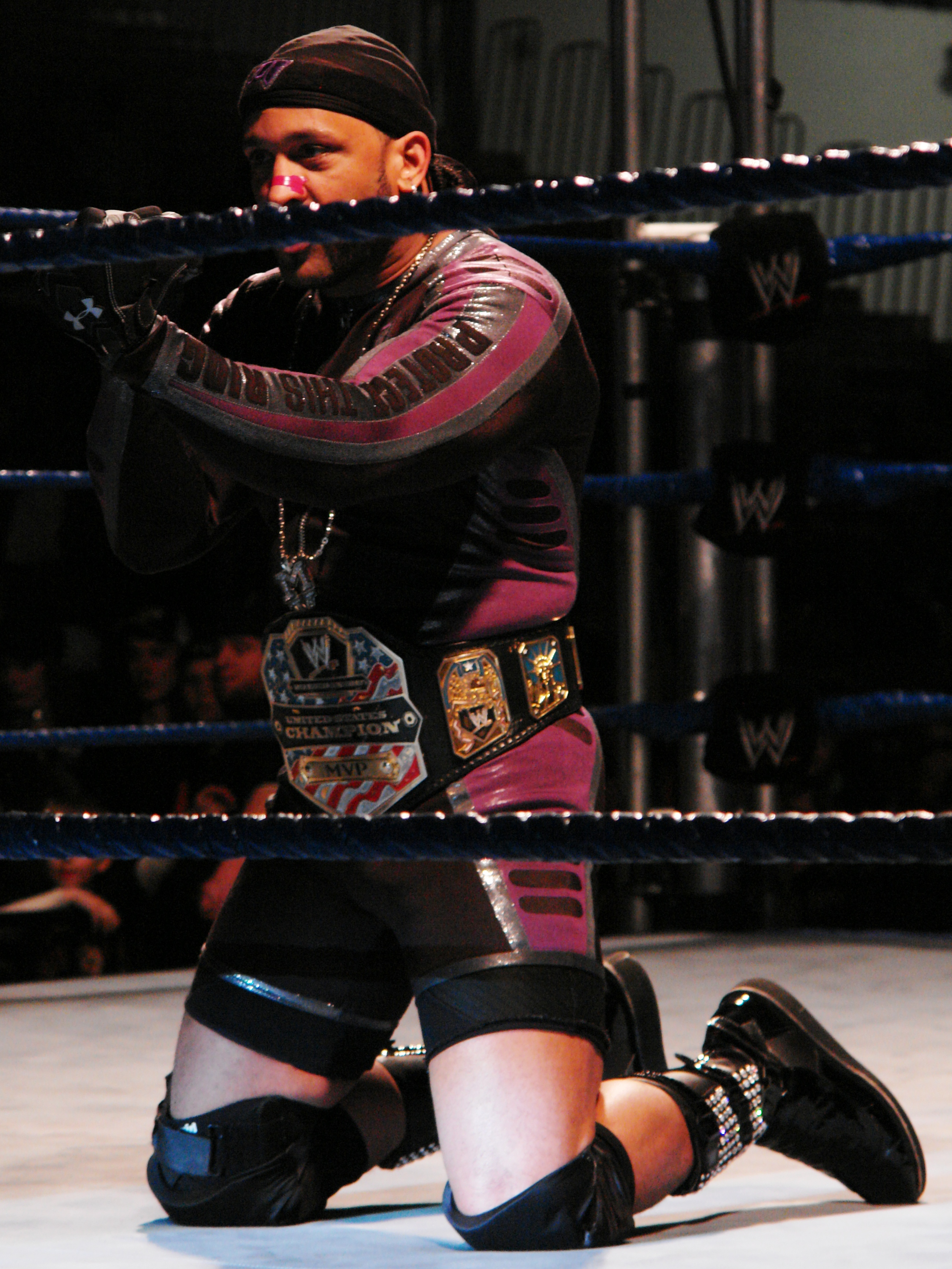
Montel Vontavious Porter as SmackDown!'s United States Champion.

The seventh match was a two out of three falls match for the WWE United States Championship between champion Chris Benoit and Montel Vontavious Porter (MVP). MVP gained the first pinfall by pinning Benoit after executing a Playmaker. MVP gained the second fall and won the match after pinning Benoit with an Inside Cradle.

Next was the main event, which saw John Cena defend the WWE Championship against The Great Khali. Khali attacked Cena early in the match, but Cena countered and gained the advantage. Cena performed a diving legdrop bulldog and followed it up by putting Khali in the STFU. Cena forced Khali to submit to the hold, but Khali's foot was under the rope, meaning Cena should have broken the hold. The referee, however, did not see this and declared Cena the winner. Cena retained the WWE Championship and gained possession of the belt, which Khali had (kayfabe) stolen prior to the event.

== Aftermath ==
Bobby Lashley and Team McMahon continued their rivalry, as Mr. McMahon was forced to book himself against Lashley at One Night Stand in a Street Fight for the ECW World Championship. Lashley won the right to face McMahon by winning a gauntlet match with the stipulation that he would receive a title shot if he beat Chris Masters, Viscera, Umaga, and Shane McMahon in succession. At One Night Stand, Lashley defeated Mr. McMahon in a Street Fight to win the ECW World Championship despite interference by Shane McMahon and Umaga.

Edge and Batista also continued their rivalry over the World Heavyweight Championship after Batista defeated Mark Henry, Kane, and Finlay in a fatal four-way match to become the number one contender to the title. On the June 1 episode of SmackDown!, Batista verbally and physically confronted Edge on the SmackDown! debut of Edge's Cutting Edge talk show. At One Night Stand, Edge and Batista faced each other in a Steel Cage match for the World Heavyweight Championship. Edge retained his title after escaping the steel cage first.

Shawn Michaels did not appear on-screen until October 8, when he returned to confront Randy Orton and restart their feud. On the May 28 episode of Raw, Rob Van Dam claimed on WWE's website that Orton should not have attacked Shawn Michaels at Judgment Day. Orton challenged Van Dam to a match that same night, which Orton won by forfeit. At One Night Stand, the two had a stretcher match, which Van Dam won. After the match, Van Dam was attacked by Orton.

John Cena and The Great Khali also continued to feud over the WWE Championship. Following the controversial ending to their match at Judgment Day, where Cena forced Khali to submit while his foot was underneath the bottom rope, meaning Cena should have released the hold, Khali challenged Cena to a Falls Count Anywhere match for One Night Stand. Cena accepted, and Khali attacked him, performing a Chokebomb. At One Night Stand, Cena retained his title by pinning Khali after performing an FU off a crane.

== Results ==
No.	Results	Stipulations	Times
1^{D}	Kane defeated William Regal (with Dave Taylor) by pinfall	Singles match	—
2	Ric Flair defeated Carlito by submission	Singles match	15:34
3	Bobby Lashley defeated Mr. McMahon (c), Shane McMahon, and Umaga by pinfall	Handicap match for the ECW World Championship (Note: Since Lashley did not pin Mr. McMahon, he did not win the championship.)	1:15
4	CM Punk defeated Elijah Burke by pinfall	Singles match	16:50
5	Randy Orton defeated Shawn Michaels by technical knockout	Singles match	4:32
6	The Hardys (Matt Hardy and Jeff Hardy) (c) defeated Lance Cade and Trevor Murdoch	Tag team match for the World Tag Team Championship	15:02
7	Edge (c) defeated Batista by pinfall	Singles match for the World Heavyweight Championship	10:38
8	Montel Vontavious Porter defeated Chris Benoit (c) 2–0	Two out of three falls match for the WWE United States Championship	12:46
9	John Cena (c) defeated The Great Khali by submission	Singles match for the WWE Championship	8:15
(c) / – the champion(s) heading into the match; D / – this was a dark match
