= Over the Edge: In Your House =

1998 World Wrestling Federation pay-per-view event

- Promotional poster featuring Ken Shamrock and Billy Gunn
- Promotion: World Wrestling Federation
- Date: May 31, 1998
- City: Milwaukee, Wisconsin
- Venue: Wisconsin Center Arena
- Attendance: 9,822
- Buy rate: 203,000

Pay-per-view chronology
← Previous; Unforgiven: In Your House	Next → King of the Ring

In Your House chronology
← Previous; Unforgiven	Next → Fully Loaded

Over the Edge chronology
← Previous; First	Next → 1999

Over the Edge: In Your House was a 1998 professional wrestling pay-per-view (PPV) event produced by the World Wrestling Federation (WWF, renamed WWE in 2002). It was the 22nd In Your House and the inaugural Over the Edge. The event took place on May 31, 1998, at the Wisconsin Center Arena in Milwaukee, Wisconsin.

Eight matches were contested at the event. In the main event, WWF Champion "Stone Cold" Steve Austin defeated Dude Love after overcoming biased officiating from Vince McMahon. On the undercard, Nation of Domination members Owen Hart, Kama Mustafa, and D'Lo Brown defeated D-Generation X members Triple H and The New Age Outlaws (Billy Gunn and "Road Dogg" Jesse James) in a six-man tag team match.

Over the Edge: In Your House was the WWF's first PPV event to have a TV Parental Guidelines rating of TV-14. The company gave all of its PPV events TV-14 ratings from this point through The Great American Bash 2008, with SummerSlam 2008 being the first of their PPVs to be rated TV-PG in over a decade.

This was the first of the In Your House events which later became the title of a PPV, replacing the method at the time of making new names for all events aside from the "Big Five" (Royal Rumble, WrestleMania, King of the Ring, SummerSlam, and Survivor Series). Over the Edge returned in May 1999 and was intended to be the annual May PPV; however, due to the death of Owen Hart at that 1999 event, Over the Edge was discontinued and replaced by Judgment Day in 2000, which was also a former In Your House event.

== Production ==
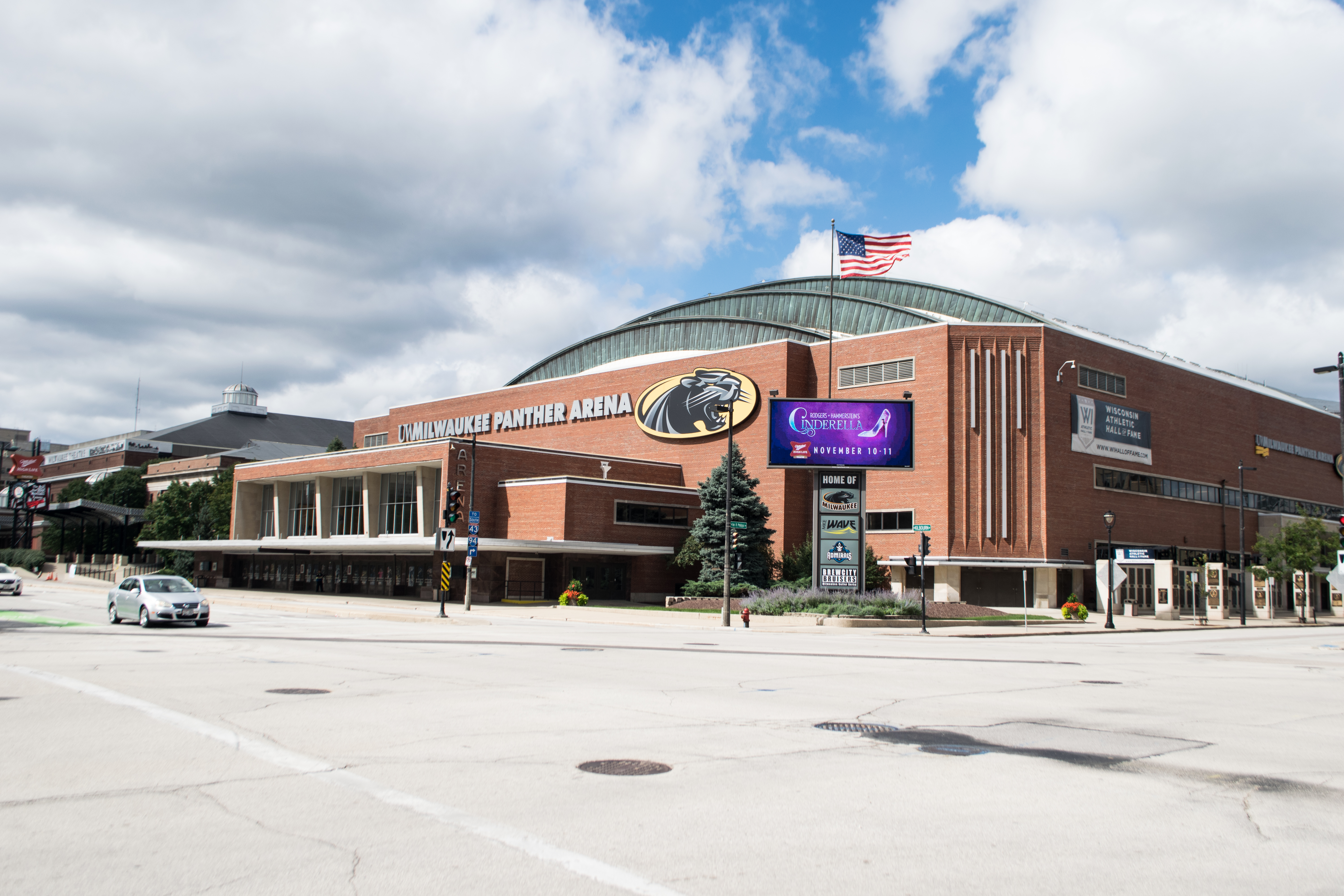
The 22nd In Your House was held in Milwaukee, Wisconsin at the Wisconsin Center Arena (pictured in 2018 after it had since been renamed as UW–Milwaukee Panther Arena).

=== Background ===
In Your House was a series of monthly professional wrestling pay-per-view (PPV) events first produced by the World Wrestling Federation (WWF, renamed WWE in 2002) in May 1995. They aired when the promotion was not holding one of its then-five major PPVs (WrestleMania, King of the Ring, SummerSlam, Survivor Series, and Royal Rumble) and were sold at a lower cost. The 22nd In Your House, titled Over the Edge: In Your House, was scheduled for May 31, 1998, at the Wisconsin Center Arena in Milwaukee, Wisconsin. It was the WWF's first PPV event to have a TV Parental Guidelines rating of TV-14.

=== Storylines ===
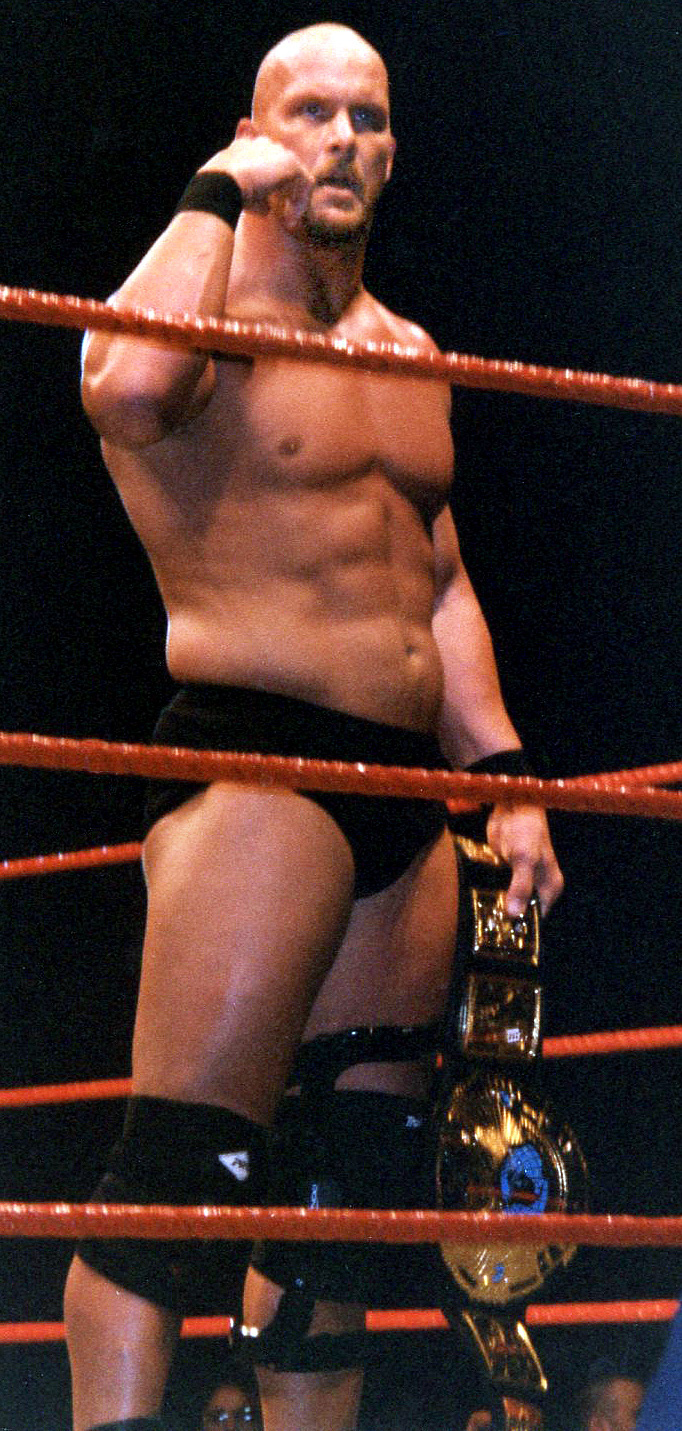
WWF Champion "Stone Cold" Steve Austin

On the April 13, 1998, episode of Raw Is War, Dude Love interfered in a match between WWF Chairman Vince McMahon and champion "Stone Cold" Steve Austin, asking the two to just "get along". McMahon responded by pushing Love down. Love then applied the Mandible claw on McMahon, who fled the ring, and on Austin, sparking the beginning of their feud. The following week on Raw, during Love's new interview segment, the Love Shack, McMahon scheduled Love to challenge Austin at Unforgiven: In Your House. Love wrestled Steve Blackman in a match, in which Love won after the ring bell rang for unknown reasons. After the match, McMahon and Love sparred until McMahon fled the ring, which allowed Austin to attack Love. At In Your House: Unforgiven, Austin attacked McMahon at ringside with a chair and then delivered a Stone Cold Stunner on Love. The referee of the match was knocked out, which led Austin to count his own pin; however, Gerald Brisco then disqualified Austin for attacking McMahon. Due to WWF rules, Love did not win the WWF Championship, and Austin retained the title. The feud continued on the May 4 episode of Raw Is War, where McMahon booked a match between Love and Terry Funk, in an attempt to affect him psychologically as Love and Funk were best friends, where Love defeated Funk. After the match, Love formed an alliance with McMahon, after McMahon approved of Love defeating Funk. The following week on Raw Is War, McMahon scheduled a WWF Championship match at Over the Edge between Love and Austin with a guest timekeeper, Gerald Brisco, a guest ring announcer, Pat Patterson, and a special guest referee, McMahon himself, with an added stipulation that if Austin put his hands on McMahon during the match, Austin would be automatically stripped of the championship. On the May 18 episode of Raw Is War, Love defeated Dustin Runnels, the former Goldust, in a number one contender's match, to ensure his main event championship match at Over the Edge.

On the May 11 episode of Raw Is War, D-Generation X (DX) attempted to cut a promo, but was interrupted by Owen Hart, with The Nation, who said that he was here "to kick some ass", which began the rivalry between DX and The Nation. Later that night, Triple H defeated Hart, while DX and The Nation interfered in the main event tag team match, in which all members of both stables brawled until the end of the show. The following week on Raw Is War, DX cut a promo that insulted The Nation, which led to The Nation and DX brawling until WWF officials broke up the fight. After the brawl was settled, DX members Road Dogg and Billy Gunn defeated The Rock and D'Lo Brown of The Nation in a tag team match, further enhancing their feud. On the final episode of Raw is War before Over the Edge, The Rock, a member of The Nation, and DX member Triple H fought to a double countout.

On the February 2 episode of Raw Is War, Vader challenged Kane to a match at No Way Out of Texas: In Your House, where Kane defeated Vader by pinfall, in the process injuring Vader. At Unforgiven: In Your House, Vader interfered during the first-ever Inferno Match when he fought Kane (who was leaving the arena) back to the ring. On the May 18 episode of Raw Is War, Vader attacked Kane during a tag team battle royal. On the final Raw Is War episode leading to Over the Edge, Vader lured Kane into a loser loses mask match, that was made official for Over the Edge. Later that night, Kane attacked Vader after his match, which led to both wrestlers brawling until Kane fled the ring.

At Unforgiven: In Your House, LOD 2000 lost a WWF Tag Team Championship match to champions The New Age Outlaws after Hawk's shoulders were pinned instead of Road Dogg's. The following night on Raw is War, LOD 2000 were at ringside to prevent D-Generation X, who they were feuding with at the time, from interfering in a match between The Disciples of Apocalypse and The New Age Outlaws which DOA won to earn a WWF Tag Team Championship match against The Outlaws the following week on Raw is War. However, on that night, LOD 2000 challenged D-Generation X to an 8-man tag team match alongside the DOA which DX accepted, thus denying the DOA their tag team championship opportunity. During the 8-man tag team match, LOD 2000 and DOA began arguing to the point both teams brawled with each other, thus beginning the feud between the two teams. On the May 11 episode of Raw is War, Skull of DOA defeated Hawk of LOD 2000 after Skull and his identical twin brother 8-Ball switched places with 8-Ball pinning Hawk while the referee didn't notice. The following week on Raw is War, DOA defeated LOD 2000 after Skull and 8-Ball once again switched places and 8-Ball pinned Animal while the referee didn't notice. LOD 2000 then challenged DOA to a 6-man tag team match with a partner of their choosing the following week on Raw is War where LOD 2000 won after their newest member, Droz pinned Chainz after a powerbomb.

== Event ==
Other on-screen personnel
Role:	Name:
English commentators	Jim Ross
English commentators	Jerry Lawler
English commentators	Michael Cole Also Interview
English commentators	Dok Hendrix Also Interview
Spanish commentators	Carlos Cabrera
Spanish commentators	Hugo Savinovich
Referees	Tim White
Referees	Jack Doan
Referees	Jim Korderas
Referees	Mike Chioda
Referees	Tony Garea
Ring announcers	Howard Finkel
Ring announcers	Pat Patterson (Guest ring announcer)

The first match that aired was the tag team encounter of L.O.D. 2000 (Hawk and Animal) and the Disciples of Apocalypse (Skull and 8-Ball). Control of the match went back and forth between the two teams throughout, until 8-Ball attempted to switch places with Skull. Droz, who was at ringside in L.O.D's corner, interfered by clotheslining 8-Ball, allowing Animal to powerslam and pin Skull. After that match, The Rock came out to insult the Milwaukee audience, but was attacked by Faarooq with a chair and a piledriver onto the chair. Commissioner Slaughter decided that The Rock would compete later in the event, despite any injury he may have suffered.

The next match was the encounter of Steve Blackman and Jeff Jarrett. The two superstars fought back and forth exchanging control of the match, however, Jarrett would grab one of Blackman's arnis sticks and attempted to hit Blackman with it, however, Blackman countered and retrieved the stick and hit Jarrett with it. Blackman then went to the top rope to attempt an aerial technique, but Tennessee Lee hit him with the arnis stick, leading to Jarrett pinning Blackman for the win.

The third match was the encounter of Marc Mero against a mystery opponent chosen by Sable, where if Sable's representative lost, she would have to leave the WWF. After Mero was introduced, Sable came out and told Mero that she did not need a man to fight for her, insisting she would fight Mero. Mero then lay down and allowed Sable to pin him. However, he reversed the pin at a two count and rolled Sable into a small package, winning the match via pinfall. This forced Sable to leave the WWF.

Next, Bradshaw and Taka Michinoku fought Kaientai (Dick Togo, Men's Teioh and Sho Funaki) in a Handicap match. Bradshaw dominated the match by squashing all Kaientai members, but in the end Michinoku was pinned by Togo following a diving senton.

After this, The Rock defended the Intercontinental Championship against Faarooq. When The Rock did not come out at first, Commissioner Slaughter gave him ten seconds to come out or lose his championship. The Rock eventually came out, wearing a neck brace, and was attacked by Faarooq in the aisle. After they entered the ring, the two wrestlers fought back and forth. Faarooq delivered a Spinebuster to The Rock, who voided the pinfall attempt by placing his foot on the ring rope. As Faarooq argued with the referee, The Rock rolled him up into pinfall to retain the Intercontinental Championship.

The sixth match was a Mask vs. Mask match between Kane and Vader, in which the loser would have to unmask. The two wrestlers fought back and forth throughout the match until Vader gained control after he hit Kane with a wrench; however, Kane countered a moonsault attempt into a Tombstone Piledriver and gained the pinfall to win the match. After the match, Kane unmasked Vader.

The next match, and final match on the undercard, was a Six-man tag team match between D-Generation X members, Triple H, Billy Gunn, and Road Dogg Jesse James and Nation members, Owen Hart, Kama Mustafa, and D'Lo Brown. After back and forth action with frequent tags, DX gained control after Chyna and Mark Henry, who were at ringside and respectively were in DX and The Nation's corner, attacked one another. This caused the referee to become distracted, allowing Triple H and Gunn to deliver a Spike piledriver on Brown; however, Hart came into the ring and attacked Gunn and Triple H. Hart performed a Pedigree on Triple H, and covered him for a successful pinfall.

In the main event, "Stone Cold" Steve Austin defended his WWF Championship against Dude Love, with Vince McMahon as the guest referee. . Just before the match ensued, The Undertaker entered the arena and took his place at ringside as the unofficial enforcer for the match. The two wrestlers fought back and forth into the beginning of the match, and took the fight to ringside, when guest ring announcer Pat Patterson declared the match a No Disqualification match, on McMahon's orders. When the two wrestlers took the fight into the aisle, Patterson made the match a Falls Count Anywhere match, once again on McMahon's orders. Austin and Love continued to brawl all over the arena. When the fight returned to the ring, Patterson handed Love a chair, which Love and Austin used to attack each other. After Dude Love accidentally hit McMahon with the chair, Austin delivered a Stone Cold Stunner on Love. A substitute referee attempted to count Austin's pinfall attempt, but was stopped by Patterson, allowing Love to perform the Mandible claw on Austin. Both Patterson and timekeeper Gerald Brisco attempted to count the pinfall, but The Undertaker, who was at ringside, chokeslammed them both through the broadcast tables. Austin then delivered another Stone Cold Stunner on Love and moved the still unconscious McMahon's hand to count the pinfall, while the Undertaker ordered the bell to ring, giving Austin the victory.

== Reception ==
In 2008, J.D. Dunn of 411Mania gave the event a rating of 6.5 [Average], stating, "Time hasn't been kind to this one thanks to a lot of recycled storylines over the past decade, but everything was fresh at the time. There really isn't that much to care about on the undercard, and the main event is available on the Foley disc. Still, the characters, and not the wrestling, drove the PPVs around this time, so it's a good bit of nostalgia. I'll be generous. Mild thumbs up for Over the Edge."

== Aftermath ==
The next night on Raw Is War, Kane defeated The Undertaker to become the number one contender for "Stone Cold" Steve Austin's WWF Championship. The following week, during a segment with Vince McMahon, Kane, Mankind and The Undertaker attacked Austin and put him into a casket. On the June 15 episode, Austin and Kane brawled on top of a lowered Cell. At King of the Ring Kane defeated Austin in a First Blood match to win the WWF Championship but lost the championship back to Austin the next night on Raw is War.

Dude Love resumed his Mankind gimmick and his feud with The Undertaker, helping Kane to defeat The Undertaker in the aforementioned number one contender's match. On the June 15, 1998, episode of Raw Is War, A Hell in a Cell match pitting The Undertaker and Austin against Mankind and Kane ended up in a no contest. At King of the Ring, The Undertaker defeated Mankind in a Hell in a Cell match; Mankind was thrown both off the roof and through the roof of the cell, sustaining several severe injuries.

The In Your House branding was retired following February 1999's St. Valentine's Day Massacre: In Your House event, as the company moved to install permanent names for each of its monthly PPVs. Over the Edge returned in May 1999 as its own PPV event, which in turn made Over the Edge the first PPV that was originally an In Your House event to branch off as its own PPV. However, the 1999 event would be the only other Over the Edge PPV, as following the death of Owen Hart at that event, Over the Edge was discontinued and replaced by Judgment Day in 2000.

== Results ==
No.	Results	Stipulations	Times
1	LOD 2000 (Animal and Hawk) (with Droz and Sunny) defeated The Disciples of Apocalypse (8-Ball and Skull) (with Chainz) by pinfall	Tag team match	9:57
2	Jeff Jarrett (with Tennessee Lee) defeated Steve Blackman by pinfall	Singles match	10:15
3	Marc Mero defeated Sable by pinfall	Singles match	0:30
4	Kaientai (Dick Togo, Mens Teioh, and Sho Funaki) (with Yamaguchi-san) defeated Justin Bradshaw and Taka Michinoku by pinfall	3-on-2 Handicap match	9:52
5	The Rock (c) defeated Faarooq by pinfall	Singles match for the WWF Intercontinental Championship	5:07
6	Kane (with Paul Bearer) defeated Vader by pinfall	Mask vs. Mask match	7:20
7	The Nation of Domination (D'Lo Brown, Kama Mustafa, and Owen Hart) (with Mark Henry) defeated D-Generation X (Triple H, Billy Gunn, and Road Dogg) (with Chyna and X-Pac) by pinfall	Six-man tag team match	18:33
8	"Stone Cold" Steve Austin (c) defeated Dude Love by pinfall	Falls Count Anywhere match for the WWF Championship; Mr. McMahon was the special guest referee. Pat Patterson was the special guest ring announcer. Gerald Brisco was the special guest timekeeper. The Undertaker was the special guest enforcer.	22:27
(c) / – the champion(s) heading into the match
