= WWE Judgment Day (2004) =

World Wrestling Entertainment pay-per-view event

Judgment Day
- Promotional poster featuring The Undertaker
- Promotion: World Wrestling Entertainment
- Brand: SmackDown!
- Date: May 16, 2004
- City: Los Angeles, California
- Venue: Staples Center
- Attendance: 18,722
- Buy rate: 235,000
- Tagline: Souls will cry.

Pay-per-view chronology
← Previous; Backlash	Next → Bad Blood

Judgment Day chronology
← Previous; 2003	Next → 2005

The 2004 Judgment Day was a professional wrestling pay-per-view (PPV) event produced by World Wrestling Entertainment (WWE). It was the sixth Judgment Day and took place on May 16, 2004, at the Staples Center in Los Angeles, California. It was held exclusively for wrestlers from the promotion's SmackDown! brand division, which made it the first brand-exclusive Judgment Day after the previous year's event also featured wrestlers from Raw.

The main event was for the WWE Championship between Eddie Guerrero and John "Bradshaw" Layfield (JBL), which JBL won by disqualification after Guerrero hit JBL with the WWE Championship belt; titles do not change hands via disqualification or countout unless stipulated, thus Guerrero retained. Featured matches on undercard were The Undertaker versus Booker T, John Cena versus René Duprée for the WWE United States Championship, and Chavo Guerrero versus Jacqueline for the WWE Cruiserweight Championship.

== Production ==
=== Background ===
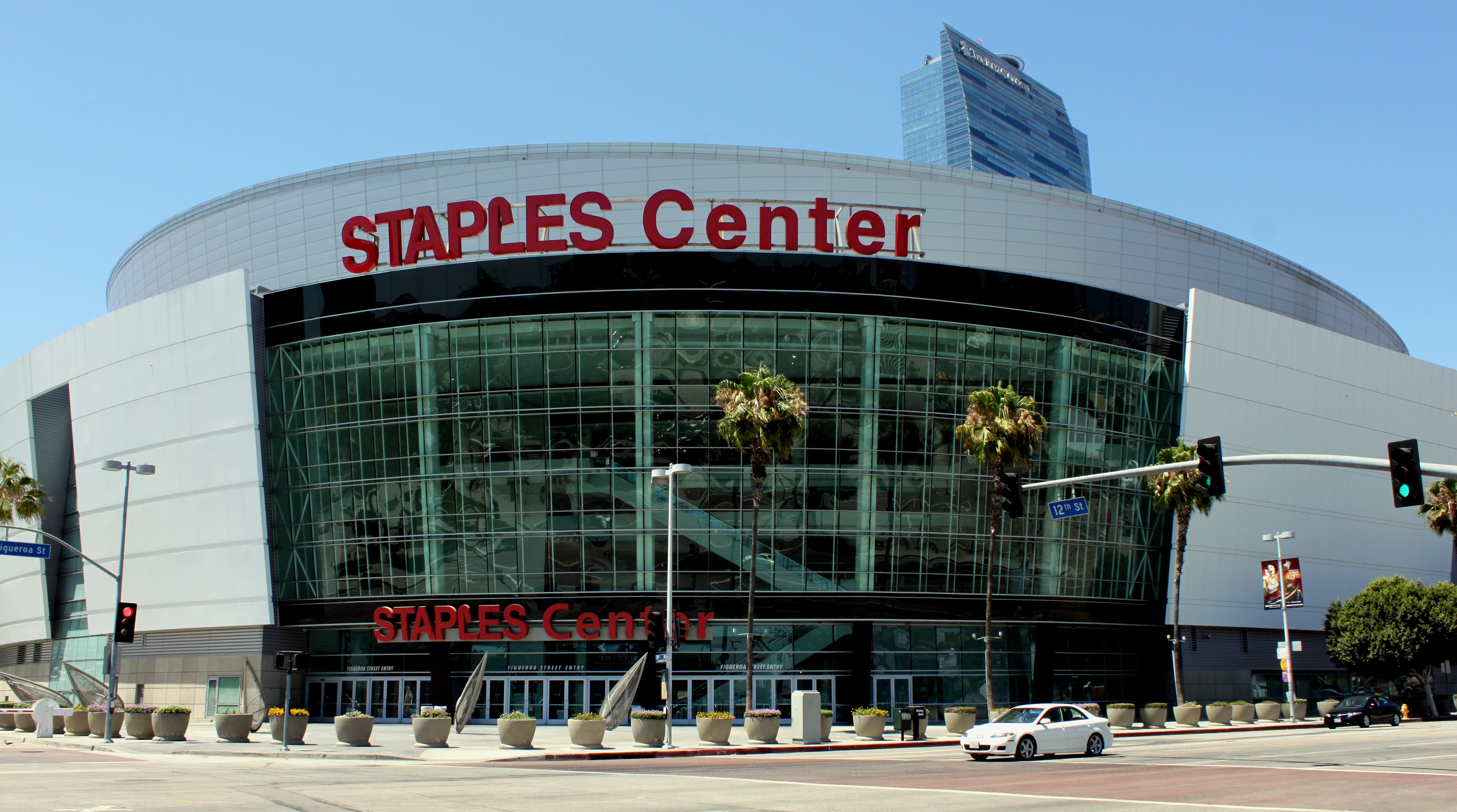
The event was held at the Staples Center in Los Angeles, California.

Judgment Day was a professional wrestling pay-per-view (PPV) event first held by World Wrestling Entertainment (WWE) as the 25th In Your House PPV event in October 1998. Following the discontinuation of the In Your House series in February 1999, Judgment Day was reinstated in May 2000 as its own PPV event, establishing Judgment Day as the promotion's annual May PPV. The sixth event was held on May 16, 2004, at the Staples Center in Los Angeles, California. While the previous year's event featured wrestlers from both the Raw and SmackDown! brands, the 2004 event was held exclusively for SmackDown!, which made it the first brand-exclusive Judgment Day.

=== Storylines ===
The event featured eight professional wrestling matches that resulted from scripted storylines. Results were predetermined by WWE's writers on the SmackDown! brand, while storylines were produced on WWE's weekly television show, SmackDown!.

The main event at Judgment Day was between Eddie Guerrero and John "Bradshaw" Layfield (JBL) over the WWE Championship. On the March 25 episode of SmackDown!, recently drafted Raw superstar Booker T insulted SmackDown! superstars. The new SmackDown! General Manager Kurt Angle gave Booker T an opportunity against Guerrero for the WWE Championship. However, JBL, a member of the recently disbanded APA who turned heel earlier in the night, interfered in the match and attacked Guerrero with a Clothesline from Hell. On the April 8 episode of SmackDown!, Angle announced that the winner of the Great American Award would become the number-one contender for the WWE Championship, which he gave to JBL. However, Guerrero came out, stole the trophy and broke it. On the April 22 episode of SmackDown!, Guerrero lost to D-Von Dudley in a non-title match after interference from Bubba Ray Dudley, and was attacked by JBL after the match. On the May 6 episode of SmackDown!, it was announced that JBL caused Guerrero's mother to suffer a (kayfabe) heart attack during an altercation between the two at a house show four days prior. The following week on SmackDown!, Guerrero was arrested after he destroyed JBL's limousine, and JBL defeated Rey Mysterio.

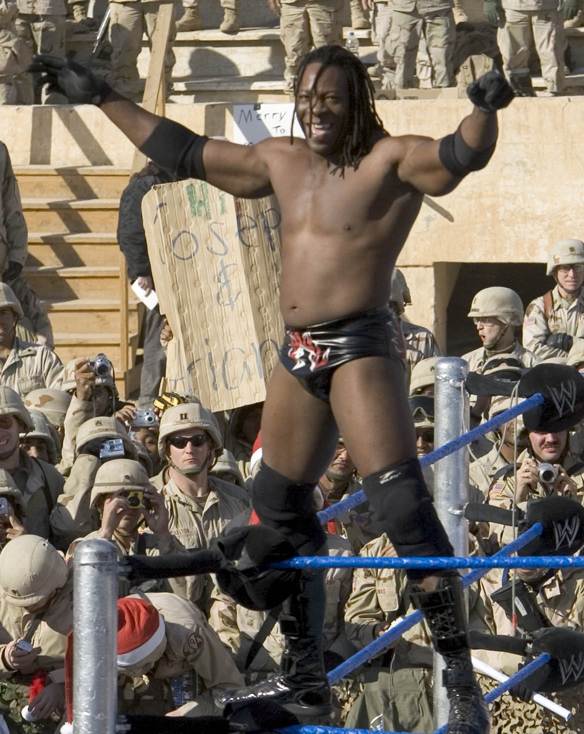
Booker T, who faced The Undertaker at the event

The other main match on the card was a standard match between Booker T and The Undertaker. On the April 22 episode of SmackDown!, after defeating Rob Van Dam, Booker T bragged about how he was the biggest star on the SmackDown! brand, but then ran away after hearing The Undertaker's entrance theme. The following week on SmackDown!, Booker T tried to attack The Undertaker to no avail, leading to Kurt Angle booking a match between the two at Judgment Day. On the May 6 episode of SmackDown!, Booker T went to a cemetery and grabbed dirt from an unmarked grave to use against The Undertaker.

Another feud heading into the event was between John Cena and René Duprée over the WWE United States Championship. The feud began after Duprée was drafted to the SmackDown! brand. On the April 22 episode of SmackDown!, Duprée debuted a talk show segment called "Cafe de René", with Torrie Wilson as his guest. Duprée insulted Wilson and tried to attack her, only for Cena to save her. The following week on SmackDown!, Cena interfered in Duprée's match with Wilson, and Kurt Angle announced that Cena would defend the United States Championship against Duprée at Judgment Day.

== Event ==
Other on-screen personnel
Role:	Name:
English commentators	Michael Cole
English commentators	Tazz
Spanish commentators	Carlos Cabrera
Spanish commentators	Hugo Savinovich
Interviewer	Josh Mathews
Ring announcer	Tony Chimel
Referees	Charles Robinson
Referees	Nick Patrick
Referees	Jimmy Korderas

Before the Judgment Day event aired live on pay-per-view, Mark Jindrak defeated Funaki in a match that aired on Sunday Night Heat.

=== Preliminary matches ===
The pay-per-view began with a tag team match, where the team of Rey Mysterio and Rob Van Dam faced The Dudley Boyz (Bubba Ray Dudley and D-Von Dudley). The match was evenly controlled by both teams. Bubba Ray and D-Von attempted a 3-D on Mysterio, but Van Dam prevented the move and Mysterio performed a 619 on Bubba Ray and D-Von. Van Dam performed a Five Star Frog Splash on D-Von and pinned him to win the match.

The next match was between Torrie Wilson and Dawn Marie. Wilson ripped Marie's trunks and exposed her thong before pinning Marie with a backslide to win the match.

The third match was between Mordecai and Scotty 2 Hotty, which Mordecai won after performing a crucifix powerbomb.

The fourth match was between Charlie Haas and Rico (managed by Miss Jackie) and Billy Gunn and Hardcore Holly for the WWE Tag Team Championship. Holly attempted to execute the Alabama Slam on Haas, but Rico performed a superkick on Holly while Gunn distracted the referee. Haas pinned Holly with a sunset flip to retain the titles.

The following match was between Jacqueline and Chavo Guerrero (managed by Chavo Classic) for the WWE Cruiserweight Championship. Guerrero wrestled the match with his left arm tied behind his back. After back and forth action, Chavo Classic untied Guerrero's left arm and distracted the referee, allowing Guerrero to hit Jacqueline with the arm, drop her throat-first over the top rope and perform a Gory Bomb to win the title.

After that, John Cena defended the WWE United States Championship against René Duprée. Cena performed an FU on Dupree to retain the title.

=== Main event matches ===
The next match was a standard match between The Undertaker and Booker T. In the climax, the referee was knocked down, and Booker T threw dirt at the Undertaker to no effect. Booker T performed the scissors kick on The Undertaker for a two count. The Undertaker executed a clothesline followed by a Tombstone Piledriver on Booker T for the pinfall victory.

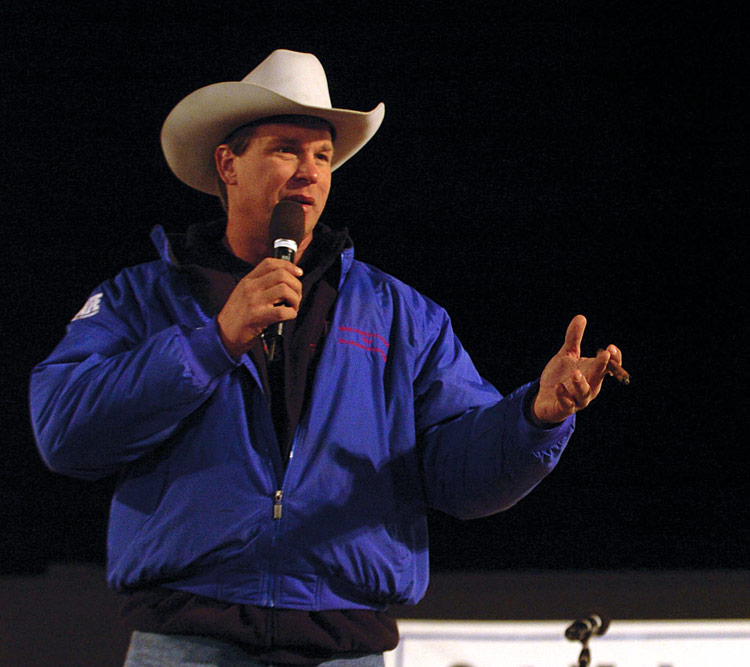
John "Bradshaw" Layfield (JBL) faced Eddie Guerrero for the WWE Championship

In the main event, Eddie Guerrero defended the WWE Championship against John "Bradshaw" Layfield (JBL). Guerrero attempted to execute a plancha on JBL, but JBL caught Guerrero with a fallaway slam onto the floor and performed a back body drop onto a broadcast table. Back in the ring, JBL applied a bear hug, but Guerrero escaped by poking JBL in the eye and performed a dropkick followed by Three Amigos. After Guerrero collided with the referee, JBL hit Guerrero with a steel chair, causing Guerrero to bleed profusely (which in reality was caused by botched blading that resulted in Guerrero cutting an artery in his forehead). JBL performed a Clothesline from Hell on Guerrero as another referee counted the pinfall for a two count. JBL attempted a second Clothesline from Hell on Guerrero, but Guerrero avoided and collided with the referee. JBL powerbombed Guerrero as the original referee counted the pinfall for a two count. Guerrero went for a frog splash, which JBL avoided. JBL retrieved a steel chair, distracting the referee and allowing JBL to retrieve the title belt. Guerrero attacked JBL with a low blow whilst the referee was distracted. The referee disqualified Guerrero after he struck JBL with the title belt, meaning JBL won the match by disqualification, but Guerrero retained the WWE Championship. After the match, Guerrero continued to attack JBL with the title belt and a steel chair, causing JBL to bleed, until officials separated the two.

"The chair shot was very stiff. [...] Eddie went deep. Very deep. I had no idea until I watched that tape back how much blood there was, I have seen some bloodbaths in Japan, Europe, Mexico and Texas-I had been in several-I have never seen anything like that."

— Layfield recounting the match between him and Guerrero at Judgment Day

== Aftermath ==
After Judgment Day, SmackDown! General Manager Kurt Angle named John "Bradshaw" Layfield (JBL) as the number-one contender to Eddie Guerrero's WWE Championship at The Great American Bash, and JBL announced that Angle granted him permission to choose the stipulation for the match. On the June 3 episode of SmackDown!, JBL announced that his match against Guerrero would be a Texas Bullrope match. At The Great American Bash, JBL defeated Guerrero to become the new WWE Champion. JBL defeated Guerrero in a steel cage match to retain the title on the July 15 episode of SmackDown!. JBL would hold the WWE Championship until losing it to John Cena at WrestleMania 21.

The Undertaker began a feud with The Dudley Boyz (Bubba Ray Dudley and D-Von Dudley) on the May 27 episode of SmackDown!, when The Dudley Boyz abducted The Undertaker's manager, Paul Bearer, after Paul Heyman told them to "make an impact". The following week, Heyman told The Undertaker to align himself with The Dudley Boyz, or else he would never see Bearer again. On the June 17 episode of SmackDown!, a handicap match between The Undertaker and The Dudley Boyz was booked for The Great American Bash, with the stipulation being if The Dudley Boyz won, Bearer would be buried in a glass crypt with cement. At The Great American Bash, The Undertaker defeated The Dudley Boyz. However, after the match, The Undertaker pulled the lever to the cement truck, which in turn filled the crypt with Bearer inside full of cement. It was announced on the following episode of SmackDown! that Bearer survived his concrete burial, but sustained severe internal damage, including injuries to the lungs and trachea.

== Results ==
No.	Results	Stipulations	Times
1^{H}	Mark Jindrak (with Theodore Long) defeated Funaki	Singles match	3:44
2	Rey Mysterio and Rob Van Dam defeated The Dudley Boyz (Bubba Ray and D-Von)	Tag team match	15:17
3	Torrie Wilson defeated Dawn Marie	Singles match	6:15
4	Mordecai defeated Scotty 2 Hotty	Singles match	3:02
5	Charlie Haas and Rico (c) (with Miss Jackie) defeated Billy Gunn and Hardcore Holly	Tag team match for the WWE Tag Team Championship	10:26
6	Chavo Guerrero (with Chavo Classic) defeated Jacqueline (c)	Singles match for the WWE Cruiserweight Championship	4:49
7	John Cena (c) defeated René Duprée	Singles match for the WWE United States Championship	9:54
8	The Undertaker (with Paul Bearer) defeated Booker T	Singles match	11:28
9	John "Bradshaw" Layfield defeated Eddie Guerrero (c) by disqualification	Singles match for the WWE Championship	23:16
(c) / – the champion(s) heading into the match; H / – the match was broadcast prior to the pay-per-view on Sunday Night Heat
