= WWE Judgment Day (2008) =

World Wrestling Entertainment pay-per-view event

Judgment Day
- Promotional poster featuring Triple H alongside various other WWE wrestlers in the upper cells
- Promotion: World Wrestling Entertainment
- Brand(s): Raw; SmackDown; ECW
- Date: May 18, 2008
- City: Omaha, Nebraska
- Venue: Qwest Center
- Attendance: 11,324
- Buy rate: 252,000

Pay-per-view chronology
← Previous; Backlash	Next → One Night Stand

Judgment Day chronology
← Previous; 2007	Next → 2009

The 2008 Judgment Day was a professional wrestling pay-per-view (PPV) event produced by World Wrestling Entertainment (WWE). It was the 10th Judgment Day and took place on May 18, 2008, at the Qwest Center Omaha in Omaha, Nebraska, held for wrestlers from the promotion's Raw, SmackDown, and ECW brand divisions.

The event's card featured seven matches. The main event was for Raw's WWE Championship, in which Triple H defeated Randy Orton in a Steel Cage match to retain the title. In SmackDown's main match, The Undertaker defeated Edge by countout, but did not win the vacant World Heavyweight Championship because unless stipulated, championships cannot be won via countout or disqualification. In ECW's main match, John Morrison and The Miz defeated Kane and CM Punk to retain the WWE Tag Team Championship. From the six scheduled bouts on the undercard, two received more promotion than the others; these bouts included two singles matches, in which Shawn Michaels defeated Chris Jericho and John Cena defeated John "Bradshaw" Layfield (JBL), respectively.

Judgment Day received 252,000 pay-per-view buys, and was instrumental in helping WWE increase its pay-per-view revenue by US$21.9 million compared to the previous year. The professional wrestling section of the Canadian Online Explorer website rated the entire event 6 out of 10, higher than the 2007 event, which was marked "as an average show". It was also the first Judgment Day PPV broadcast in high definition.

== Production ==
=== Background ===
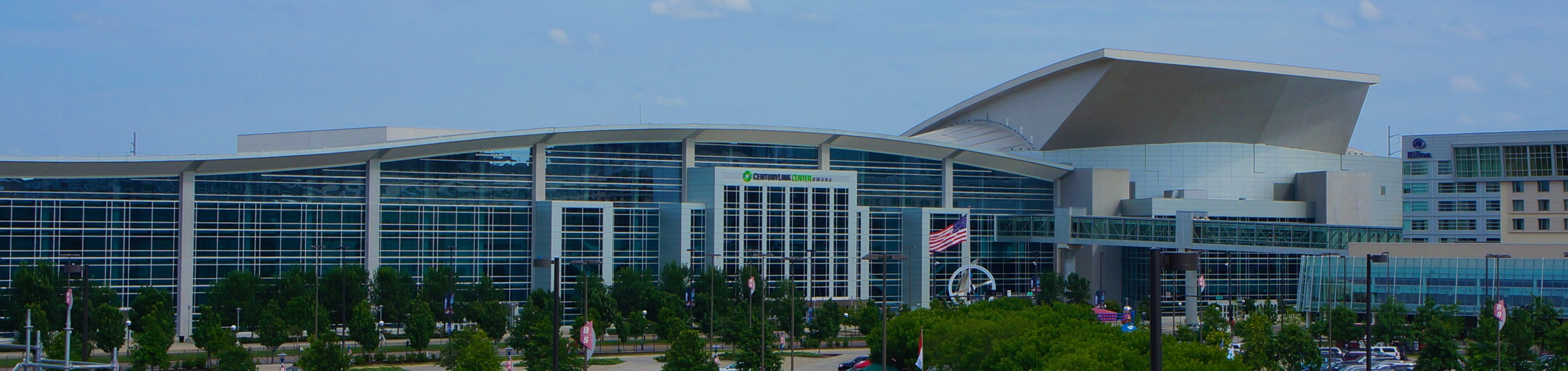
The 10th Judgment Day was held at the Qwest Center Omaha in Omaha, Nebraska.

Judgment Day was a professional wrestling pay-per-view (PPV) event first held by World Wrestling Entertainment (WWE) as the 25th In Your House PPV event in October 1998. Following the discontinuation of the In Your House series in February 1999, Judgment Day was reinstated in May 2000 as its own PPV event, establishing Judgment Day as the promotion's annual May PPV. The 10th event was held on May 18, 2008, at the Qwest Center Omaha in Omaha, Nebraska, and was held for wrestlers from the Raw, SmackDown, and ECW brand divisions.

=== Storylines ===
Judgment Day provided the culmination of various scripted plots and storylines. A month before the event, several professional wrestling matches and scripted plots were played out on WWE programming (Raw, SmackDown, and ECW) to create feuds between various wrestlers. Raw, SmackDown, and ECW were also the names of WWE's televised brands – a storyline division in which WWE assigned its employees to a specific program, thus each brand promoted distinct matches.

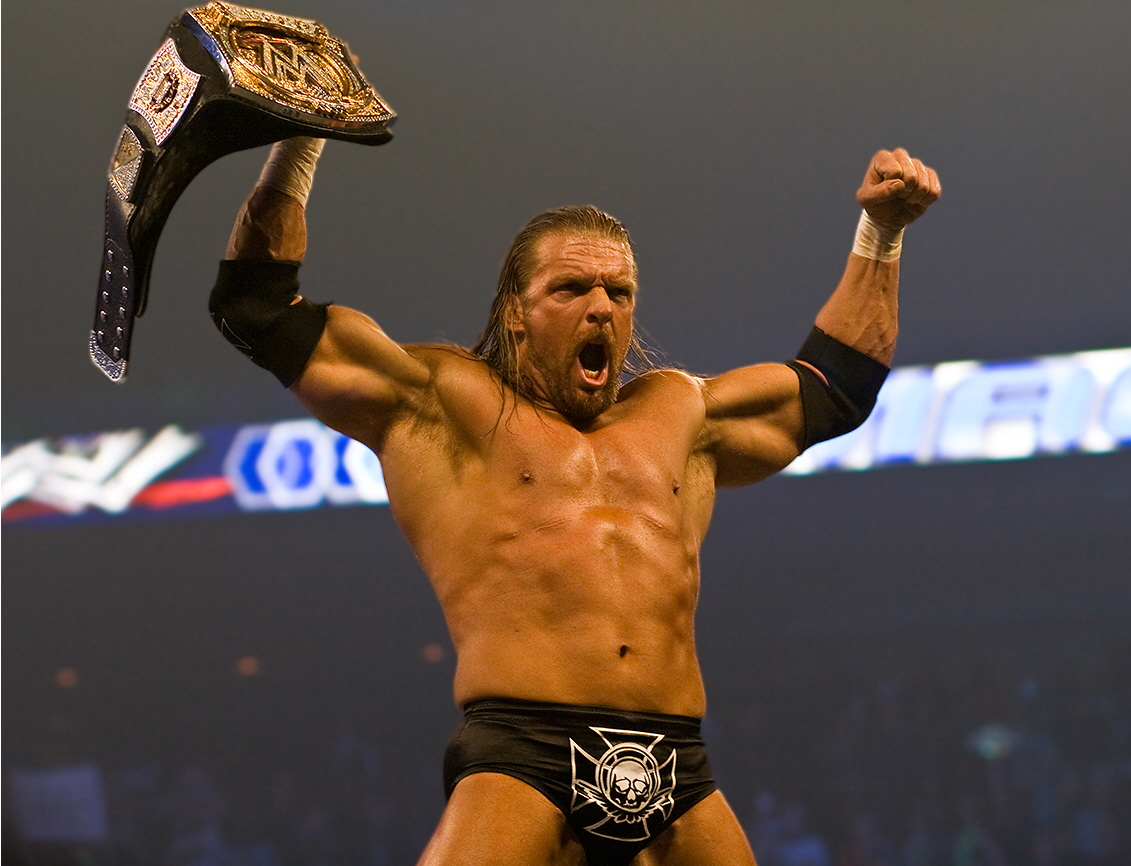
Triple H as Raw's WWE Champion

The main event scripted into Judgment Day on the Raw brand featured WWE Champion Triple H defending the title against Randy Orton in a Steel Cage match. The buildup to the match began at Backlash, where Triple H last eliminated Orton in a fatal four-way elimination match, also involving John Cena and John "Bradshaw" Layfield (JBL), to win the WWE Championship. The following night on an episode of Raw, Raw General Manager William Regal stopped a title match between Orton and Triple H, and booked the two in a Steel Cage match at Judgment Day for the WWE Championship.

One of the featured preliminary matches on the SmackDown brand was between The Undertaker and Edge for the vacant World Heavyweight Championship. At Backlash, The Undertaker defeated Edge to retain the title by forcing him to submit to the Hell's Gate. On the May 2 episode of SmackDown, SmackDown General Manager Vickie Guerrero stripped the title from The Undertaker, after claiming the Hell's Gate was an illegal submission hold and she did it to protect the other wrestlers. The following week, Guerrero booked The Undertaker in a match for the vacant title at Judgment Day against Edge, who last eliminated Batista in a battle royal to become the number one contender.

Another featured preliminary match involved Shawn Michaels and Chris Jericho in a singles match. At Backlash, Michaels defeated Batista (with Jericho as the special guest referee) in an Interpromotional match. During the match, Michaels countered a Batista Bomb attempt and appeared to have legitimately injured his left knee. On the April 28 episode of Raw, Jericho claimed that Michaels faked his knee injury to allow him to defeat Batista at Backlash, a claim that Michaels denied. The following week, it was announced that Jericho would face Michaels in a singles match at Judgment Day. On the May 12 episode of Raw, Jericho offered his apologies to Michaels for accusing him of feigning an injury, as well as giving Michaels the opportunity to back out of their match. Michaels revealed that he did indeed fake his knee injury. Four days later, on the May 16 episode of SmackDown, Batista commented that he would hurt Michaels for faking his injury.

One more rivalry from the Raw brand was between John Cena and John "Bradshaw" Layfield (JBL). In the Fatal Four-Way Elimination match at Backlash, Cena eliminated JBL by making him submit to the STFU. On the April 28 episode of Raw, JBL challenged Cena to a singles match at Judgment Day, which was made official on WWE's website.

The Divas rivalry from the Raw brand was between Mickie James, Beth Phoenix, and Melina over James' WWE Women's Championship. It was on the April 14 edition of Raw that James defeated Phoenix to win her fourth Women's Championship. Phoenix received her title rematch on the May 5 edition of Raw, but she was defeated after Melina accidentally struck Phoenix with her boot. The following week on Raw, Phoenix and Melina were defeated by James and Maria after Phoenix abandoned Melina due to being accidentally knocked off the ring apron by her partner. Melina would turn face after the match due to being attacked by Phoenix in a backstage segment.

== Event ==
Other on-screen personnel
Role:	Name:
English commentators	Jim Ross (Raw)
English commentators	Jerry Lawler (Raw)
English commentators	Michael Cole (SmackDown)
English commentators	Mick Foley (SmackDown)
English commentators	Mike Adamle (ECW)
English commentators	Tazz (ECW)
Spanish commentators	Carlos Cabrera
Spanish commentators	Hugo Savinovich
Interviewers	Todd Grisham
Ring announcers	Lillian Garcia (Raw)
Ring announcers	Justin Roberts (SmackDown)
Ring announcers	Tony Chimel (ECW)
Referees	Charles Robinson
Referees	Mike Chioda
Referees	Marty Elias
Referees	Scott Armstrong
Referees	Jack Doan
Referees	Chad Patton
Referees	Mickie Henson

Before Judgment Day aired live on pay-per-view, Hardcore Holly and Cody Rhodes defeated Santino Marella and Carlito in a dark match to retain the World Tag Team Championship.

=== Preliminary matches ===
The first televised match was between John Cena and John "Bradshaw" Layfield (JBL). JBL dominated most of the match, as he began to work on Cena's surgically-repaired right pectoral muscle. Mid-way in the match, Cena attempted a powerbomb, but Cena collapsed and could not execute the move. JBL controlled most of the match, as Cena tried to avoid JBL's assaults. JBL also applied numerous submission maneuvers on Cena. JBL performed the Clothesline from Hell on Cena and attempted another Clothesline from Hell but Cena avoided the move and executed an FU for the win.

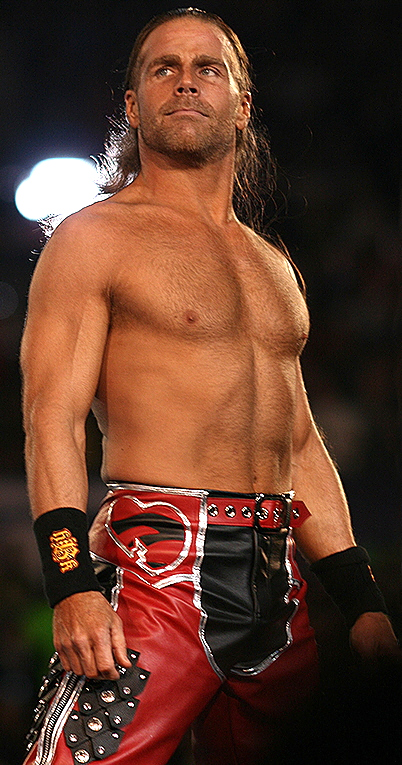
Shawn Michaels, who faced off against Chris Jericho

The next match was for the WWE Tag Team Championship, in which the champions, John Morrison and The Miz, defended the titles against Kane and CM Punk. The match began with Kane and Punk in control for the majority of the match. Back and forth action took place between both teams. Punk was tagged in the match, which led to him performing a step-up high knee and a bulldog on Morrison. Outside the ring, Kane chokeslammed the Miz, causing Punk to get distracted. Morrison took the advantage as performed the Moonlight Drive and pin Punk to retain the tag titles.

The match that followed was between Shawn Michaels and Chris Jericho. The start of the match saw Michaels and Jericho exchange several near-falls attempts before Michaels applied a modified figure four leglock, which Jericho broke free. Jericho applied the Walls of Jericho but Michaels grabbed the bottom rope, causing Jericho to break the hold. Jericho attempted the Walls of Jericho again, but Michaels countered into a straddle pin to take the win. After the match, both men shook hands.

The fourth match was a triple threat match for the WWE Women's Championship, in which Mickie James defended the title against Beth Phoenix and Melina. The match began with James attempting a roll-up on Melina for a near-fall, but Phoenix performed a clothesline on James. Mid-way in the match, James performed a splash, from the top rope, on Phoenix for a near-fall. A spot in the match saw Phoenix lift both Melina and James at the same time and try to perform a double Canadian backbreaker but Phoenix did not execute the move successfully. The match concluded when James performed the Mickie–DT on Melina, thus winning the match and retaining her title.

=== Main event matches ===
The next match was for the vacant World Heavyweight Championship between The Undertaker and Edge. The match went in and out of the ring early on, with both competitors throwing each other out of the ring. The Undertaker instinctively tried to apply the triangle choke hold on Edge, but the referee made him break the hold. Edge then tried to do one of The Undertaker's moves, Old School, but The Undertaker countered. Mid-way in the match, Edge's associates, Curt Hawkins and Zack Ryder, distracted The Undertaker after he performed an Old School on Edge. This distraction led Edge to remove the top turnbuckle padding. Back and forth action was seen between the two individuals. As the top turnbuckle was exposed, The Undertaker executed Snake Eyes on Edge. As The Undertaker ran off the ropes, Edge performed a spear for a near-fall. Afterwards, The Undertaker clotheslined Edge to the outside of the ring, then rolled to the floor after. The Undertaker threw Edge over the barricade to the front row with a clothesline while the referee began the 10-count. Both men struggled back to the floor and The Undertaker tackled Edge into the barricade at the eight count. He then rolled into the ring to win the match by countout and the belt. After the match, Vickie Guerrero announced that The Undertaker had not won the title as it can only be won by pinfall or submission, leaving the title vacant. The Undertaker performed a Tombstone Piledriver on Edge.

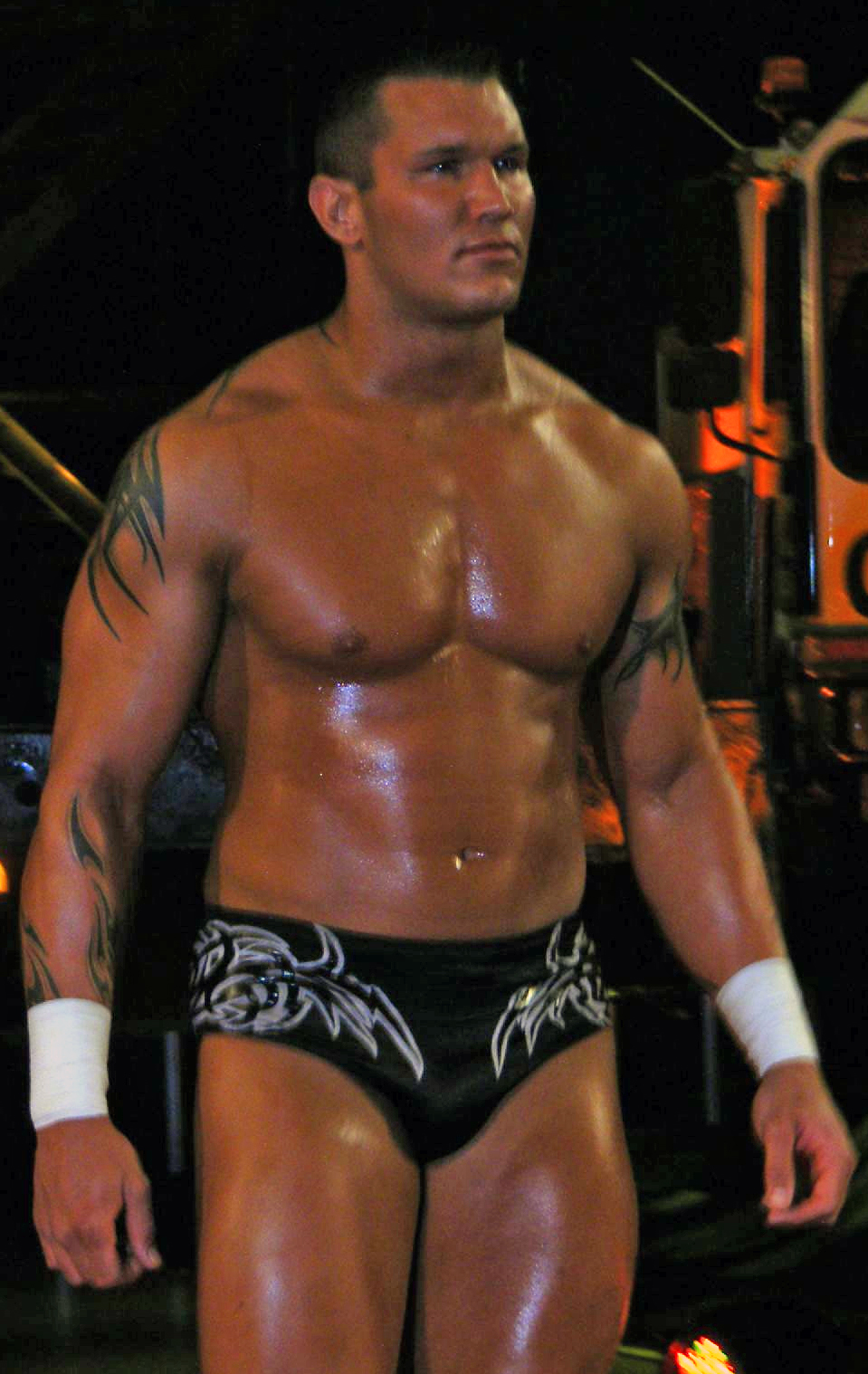
Randy Orton, who faced Triple H in a Steel Cage match for Raw's WWE Championship

The sixth match was between Montel Vontavious Porter (MVP) and Jeff Hardy. MVP quickly beat down Hardy and dominated early in the match. Hardy tried to come back with a mule kick from the corner, but MVP moved out of the way, leading Hardy to crash the mat face first. MVP controlled most of the match, until Hardy finally had some offense with a rope-aided corner dropkick in the corner. With the upper hand, Hardy performed a Swanton Bomb on MVP, but MVP moved out of the way. MVP tried to perform a running big boot, but Hardy countered into a drop toe hold. The match ended with Hardy winning the match, after performing the Whisper in the Wind.

The main event was the Steel cage match for the WWE Championship between Triple H and Randy Orton. During the beginning of the match, Triple H gained the advantage over Orton, as he performed a high knee on Orton. Orton came back with a kick to the gut before starting his prolonged attack and attempting to escape through the cage door but Triple H prevented him from escaping. Triple H took control as he took out Orton's knee with a chop block and applied a figure four leglock. After Orton broke the hold, he crawled across to the cage door to escape, but Triple H grabbed him back inside. But, on the way back in, Orton managed to grab a steel chair that was on the ring floor. Orton tried to hit Triple H with the chair, but Triple H managed to avoid being hit. Triple H grabbed the chair to hit Orton with it, but Orton gave him a low blow. Orton followed this with a chair shot to Triple H's back and performed a DDT. Throughout the match, Orton tried escaping from the cage, but was not in successful in doing so, as Triple H dragged him back in each time. The match came to an end when Orton tried to execute a running punt on Triple H's head, however, Triple H grabbed the chair and hit Orton with it. Triple H followed up by executing a Pedigree. Triple H covered Orton for the pinfall victory, and thus retaining his title.

== Reception ==
The Qwest Center Omaha had a maximum capacity of 17,000, but the capacity was reduced for the event. This event received 252,000 pay-per-view buys. Judgment Day helped WWE earn $39.8 million in revenue from pay-per-view events versus $17.9 million the previous year, which was later confirmed by Linda McMahon, the CEO of WWE, on August 5, 2008, in a quarterly result. Canadian Online Explorer's professional wrestling section rated the event 6 out of 10. The rating was higher than the Judgment Day 2007 event, which was marked as an average show that maintained the recent WWE philosophy of wrestling over ridiculousness. The standard match between Shawn Michaels and Chris Jericho was rated an 8 out of 10. Additionally, the matches of JBL versus John Cena and MVP versus Jeff Hardy were rated 5 out of 10.

The event was released on DVD on June 17, 2008. The DVD was distributed by the label, Sony Music Entertainment.

== Aftermath ==
The next night on Raw, William Regal announced that the episode's main event would be a tag team match pitting Triple H and John Cena against Randy Orton and JBL, in which if Orton and JBL were to win, Regal stated that they could choose any kind of extreme singles rematches against Triple H and Cena respectively at WWE's next pay-per-view event, One Night Stand, and creating the same stipulation that if Triple H and Cena were to win, they would face each other for the WWE Championship in an extreme match of Regal's choosing. Orton and JBL won the match. Orton chose the Last Man Standing Match. JBL picked a First Blood match against Cena. At One Night Stand, both men lost in their rematches. During the event, Orton legitimately broke his collarbone in his match with Triple H. The storyline between Shawn Michaels and Batista continued, as Batista defeated Chris Jericho to earn the right to face Michaels in a Stretcher match at One Night Stand. At One Night Stand, Batista defeated Michaels in the match, thus ending their rivalry.

At One Night Stand, The Big Show defeated CM Punk, Chavo Guerrero, Tommy Dreamer and John Morrison in a five-man Singapore Cane match to earn an ECW Championship match against Kane at Night of Champions. During the supplemental draft, Mark Henry was drafted to the ECW brand. It was announced on WWE's official website that Henry would be added to the title match, making it a Triple Threat match. At Night of Champions, Henry defeated Kane and Big Show to win the ECW Championship. Henry would eventually lose the title to Matt Hardy at Unforgiven in September.

The Undertaker and Edge continued their feud over the next several weeks. Though, a predicament insured on the May 23 episode of SmackDown, when Vickie Guerrero announced that The Undertaker would face Edge once more for the vacant World Heavyweight Championship in a Tables, Ladders, and Chairs match (TLC) at One Night Stand with the stipulation that if The Undertaker were to lose, he would be forced to leave WWE. At the June event, Edge defeated The Undertaker with the help of his accomplices, Curt Hawkins and Zack Ryder, in the TLC match to win the vacant World Heavyweight Championship and The Undertaker was forced to leave the company. On the July 25 episode of SmackDown, Guerrero reinstated The Undertaker, after learning of Edge's infidelity with their wedding planner, Guerrero and Edge were in a scripted relationship, and in retaliation she scheduled The Undertaker and Edge in a Hell in a Cell match at SummerSlam. At SummerSlam, The Undertaker defeated Edge.

== Results ==
No.	Results	Stipulations	Times
1^{D}	Hardcore Holly and Cody Rhodes (c) defeated Santino Marella and Carlito by pinfall	Tag team match for the World Tag Team Championship	—
2	John Cena defeated John "Bradshaw" Layfield by pinfall	Singles match	15:03
3	John Morrison and The Miz (c) defeated Kane and CM Punk by pinfall	Tag team match for the WWE Tag Team Championship	7:12
4	Shawn Michaels defeated Chris Jericho by pinfall	Singles match	15:56
5	Mickie James (c) defeated Beth Phoenix and Melina by pinfall	Triple threat match for the WWE Women's Championship	6:14
6	The Undertaker defeated Edge by countout	Singles match for the vacant World Heavyweight Championship; The title was not awarded due to the match ending in a count out	16:15
7	Jeff Hardy defeated Montel Vontavious Porter by pinfall	Singles match	9:42
8	Triple H (c) defeated Randy Orton by pinfall	Steel Cage match for the WWE Championship	21:12
(c) / – the champion(s) heading into the match; D / – this was a dark match

=== Championship Chase Tournament bracket ===
Qualifiers; SmackDown; May 6, 2008 (Aired: May 9)
Big Show	Pinfall
Tommy Dreamer	1:35
Finlay	Pinfall (14:46)
Montel Vontavious Porter	Pinfall (14:46)
CM Punk	4:46
Matt Hardy	Pinfall
Chavo Guerrero	5:56
Kane	Pinfall
Batista	Pinfall
John Morrison	6:34

Battle Royal Final; SmackDown; May 6, 2008 (Aired: May 9)
Edge	Win (15:59)
Big Show	—
Finlay	—
Montel Vontavious Porter	—
Matt Hardy	—
Kane	—
Batista	—

Championship Match; Judgment Day; May 18, 2008
The Undertaker	Countout
Edge	16:15
