= WWF Over the Edge =

World Wrestling Federation pay-per-view event series

- WWF Over the Edge 1999 logo
- Promotion: World Wrestling Federation
- Other name: Over the Edge: In Your House
- First event: Over the Edge: In Your House
- Last event: 1999

WWF Over the Edge was a professional wrestling pay-per-view event that was produced by the World Wrestling Federation (WWF, now WWE), a Connecticut-based professional wrestling promotion. The first event was produced as the 22nd In Your House event in May 1998. After the In Your House branding was discontinued following its February 1999 event, Over the Edge branched off as its own PPV in May that year, which was the first of the In Your House events to do so. However, this second event would be the last Over the Edge held due to the death of WWF wrestler Owen Hart at the event. In 2000, the event's pay-per-view slot was replaced by Judgment Day.

Stone Cold Steve Austin was featured in the main event of both Over the Edge events, defending the WWF Championship at both. Vince McMahon also served as a special guest referee in both of these matches. The first event was also the first WWF pay-per-view event to have a TV Parental Guidelines rating of TV-14.

== History ==
Over the Edge was first held as an In Your House pay-per-view (PPV) event. In Your House was a series of monthly PPVs first produced by the World Wrestling Federation (WWF, now WWE) in May 1995. They aired when the promotion was not holding one of its major PPVs and were sold at a lower cost. Over the Edge: In Your House was the 22nd In Your House event and took place on May 31, 1998, at the Wisconsin Center Arena in Milwaukee, Wisconsin. This first Over the Edge event was also the first WWF pay-per-view event to have a TV Parental Guidelines rating of TV-14.

After the In Your House branding was retired following February 1999's St. Valentine's Day Massacre: In Your House, Over the Edge branched off as its own PPV that May. It was the very first of the In Your House events to branch off as its own PPV. Over the Edge, however, would be a short-lived PPV, as following the death of Owen Hart at the 1999 event, Over the Edge was discontinued and replaced by Judgment Day in 2000.

== Events ==
#	Event	Date	City	Venue	Main event	Ref.
1	Over the Edge: In Your House	May 31, 1998	Milwaukee, Wisconsin	Wisconsin Center Arena	Stone Cold Steve Austin (c) vs. Dude Love in a Falls Count Anywhere match for the WWF Championship with Vince McMahon as the special guest referee	
2	Over the Edge (1999)	May 23, 1999	Kansas City, Missouri	Kemper Arena	Stone Cold Steve Austin (c) vs. The Undertaker for the WWF Championship with Vince McMahon and Shane McMahon as the special guest referees	
(c) – refers to the champion(s) heading into the match

== See also ==
- Owen Hart
- History of World Wrestling Entertainment
- Stunts that have gone wrong
