= WWE Judgment Day (2009) =

World Wrestling Entertainment pay-per-view event

Judgment Day
- Promotional poster featuring Edge
- Promotion: World Wrestling Entertainment
- Brand(s): Raw; SmackDown; ECW
- Date: May 17, 2009
- City: Rosemont, Illinois
- Venue: Allstate Arena
- Attendance: 14,822
- Buy rate: 228,000

Pay-per-view chronology
← Previous; Backlash	Next → Extreme Rules

Judgment Day chronology
← Previous; 2008	Next → Final

The 2009 Judgment Day was a professional wrestling pay-per-view (PPV) event produced by World Wrestling Entertainment (WWE). It was the 11th and final Judgment Day and took place on May 17, 2009, at the Allstate Arena in the Chicago suburb of Rosemont, Illinois, held for wrestlers from the promotion's Raw, SmackDown, and ECW brand divisions. This was the second Judgment Day at the venue, after the inaugural 1998 event when it was known as the Rosemont Horizon (renamed in 1999).

This was the final Judgment Day event as it was discontinued and replaced by Over the Limit in 2010. Years later in 2022, the event's name as well as elements of the 2009 event's poster would inspire the formation of a group called The Judgment Day. Edge, who was on the 2009 event's poster, formed the stable, and the weighing scale featured on the poster was an inspiration for the group's logo.

The event's card featured seven matches. The main event for the show saw Edge successfully defend SmackDown's World Heavyweight Championship against Jeff Hardy. In Raw's main match, WWE Champion Randy Orton was disqualified in a match against Batista and therefore retained as titles do not change hands via disqualification unless stipulated. In addition, John Cena defeated Big Show. The undercard for the show had four other singles matches: CM Punk versus Umaga, ECW Champion Christian defending the championship against Jack Swagger, John Morrison versus Shelton Benjamin, and Rey Mysterio defending SmackDown's Intercontinental Championship against Chris Jericho.

The event had 228,000 buys, down from the 2008 figure of 252,000 buys.

== Production ==
=== Background ===
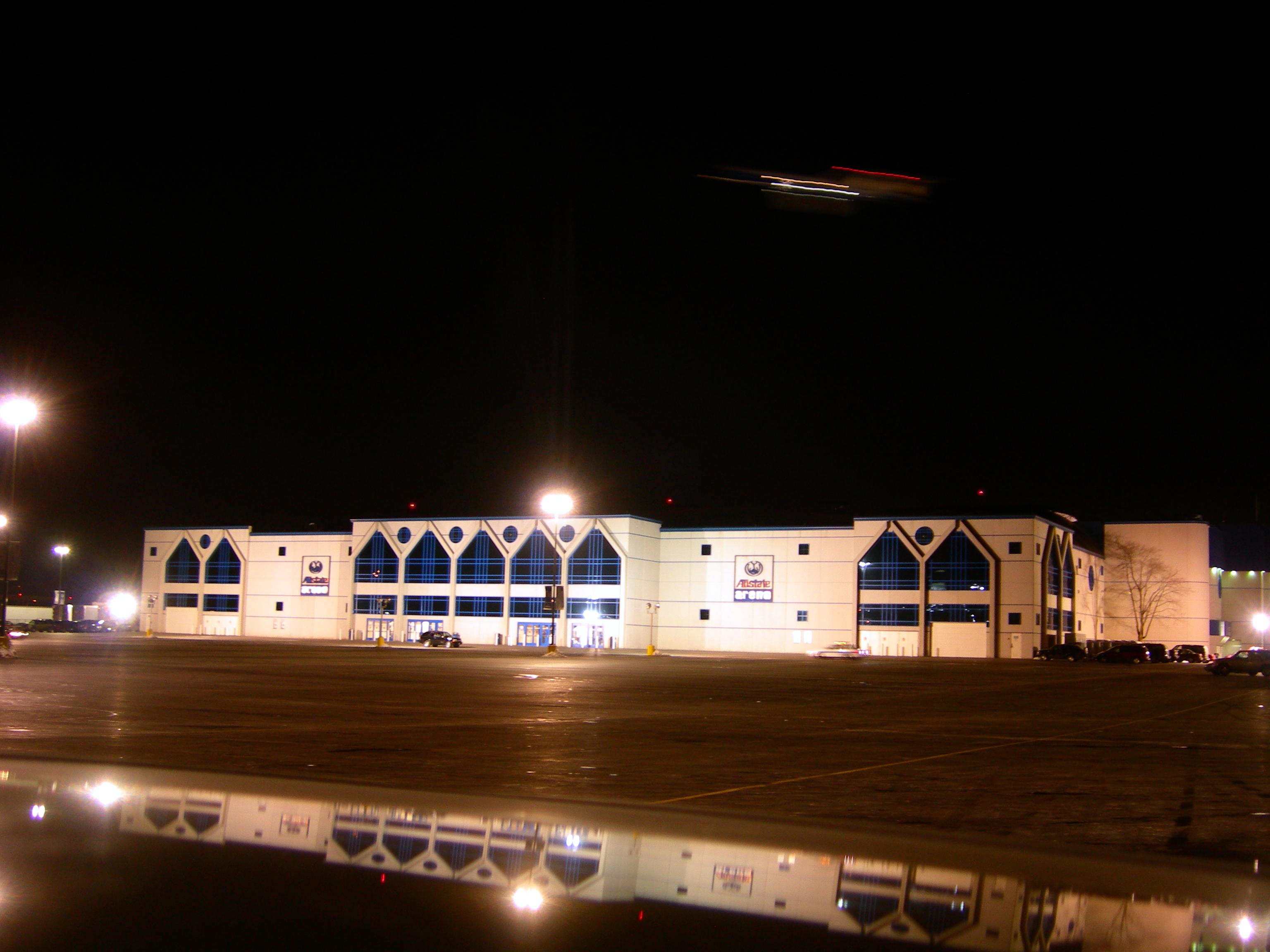
The Allstate Arena in the Chicago suburb of Rosemont, Illinois was where the 11th and final Judgment Day was held, which was its second time at the venue, after the inaugural 1998 event when it was known as the Rosemont Horizon (renamed in 1999).

Judgment Day was a professional wrestling pay-per-view (PPV) event first held by World Wrestling Entertainment (WWE) as the 25th In Your House PPV event in October 1998. Following the discontinuation of the In Your House series in February 1999, Judgment Day was reinstated in May 2000 as its own PPV event, establishing Judgment Day as the promotion's annual May PPV. The 11th event was held on May 17, 2009, at the Allstate Arena in the Chicago suburb of Rosemont, Illinois, and was held for wrestlers from the Raw, SmackDown, and ECW brand divisions. This was the second Judgment Day at the venue, after the inaugural 1998 event when it was known as the Rosemont Horizon (renamed in 1999).

=== Storylines ===
The card included eight matches resulting from scripted storylines. Results were predetermined by WWE's writers on the Raw, SmackDown, and ECW brands, while storylines were produced on WWE's weekly television shows, Raw, SmackDown, and ECW.

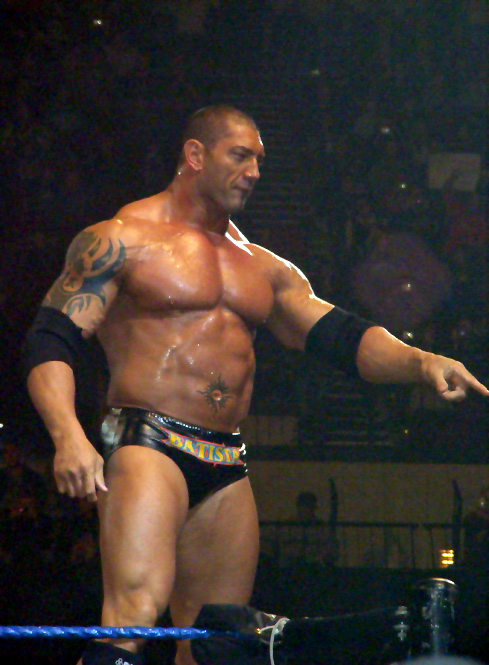
Batista, who challenged for Raw's WWE Championship at Judgment Day.

The main rivalry heading into Judgment Day from the Raw brand was between Randy Orton and Batista, who were feuding over the WWE Championship. Since January 2009, Orton had been feuding with the McMahon family, attacking Vince, Shane, and Stephanie McMahon en route to his match with Stephanie's husband Triple H for the WWE Championship at WrestleMania 25, which Triple H won. At Backlash, Orton, along with his protégés, Cody Rhodes and Ted DiBiase Jr. (collectively known as The Legacy), defeated the defending WWE Champion Triple H, Batista, and Shane McMahon in a six-man tag team match to win the title. On the April 27 episode of Raw, Batista defeated Big Show via countout to earn a WWE Championship match against Orton at Judgment Day.

ECW's primary contribution to Judgment Day was announced on the April 28 episode of ECW by the interim general manager of the show, Tiffany. She announced that ECW Champion, Christian, would be defending his championship against the previous champion, Jack Swagger, who had chosen to invoke his rematch clause guaranteed to him after losing the title at Backlash.

On the May 1 episode of SmackDown, a match took place to determine who would face Edge for the World Heavyweight Championship at Judgment Day. Jeff Hardy defeated Kane, Chris Jericho, and Rey Mysterio Jr. in a fatal four-way elimination match to become the number one contender.

At Backlash during the World Heavyweight Championship match, Big Show interfered and threw the former champion John Cena through a spotlight, resulting in Cena being incapacitated enough to lose the World Heavyweight Championship to Edge, as well as receiving storyline internal injuries. During the match to determine the number one contender for the WWE title on the April 27 episode of Raw, Cena entered the arena and distracted Big Show, leading to him losing the match against Batista. The following week on Raw, Big Show demanded a match against Cena, only to have the general manager, Vickie Guerrero, set up a match between the two for Judgment Day, when Cena would be medically cleared.

At WrestleMania 25, CM Punk won the Money in the Bank ladder match, which meant he earned a guaranteed chance to challenge any world champion at any time over the course of the next year. On the May 1 episode of SmackDown, Punk was about to invoke his championship match against the World Heavyweight Champion, Edge, only to have Umaga interfere and assault him. The following week, Punk was given another match against Edge but was again attacked by Umaga. It was announced later that night that Punk would face Umaga at Judgment Day.

== Event ==
Other on-screen personnel
Role:	Name:
English commentators	Michael Cole (Raw)
English commentators	Jerry Lawler (Raw)
English commentators	Jim Ross (SmackDown)
English commentators	Todd Grisham (SmackDown)
English commentators	Josh Mathews (ECW)
English commentators	Matt Striker (ECW)
Spanish commentators	Carlos Cabrera
Spanish commentators	Hugo Savinovich
Interviewers	Josh Mathews
Ring announcers	Lilian Garcia (Raw)
Ring announcers	Justin Roberts (SmackDown)
Ring announcers	Tony Chimel (ECW)
Referees	Charles Robinson
Referees	Mike Chioda
Referees	Scott Armstrong
Referees	Jack Doan
Referees	Marty Elias
Referees	Chad Patton

=== Dark match ===
Before the show started, an untelevised match occurred between Mickie James and Beth Phoenix with her associate in her corner, Rosa Mendes; James won the match by pinning Phoenix after performing a DDT.

=== Preliminary matches ===
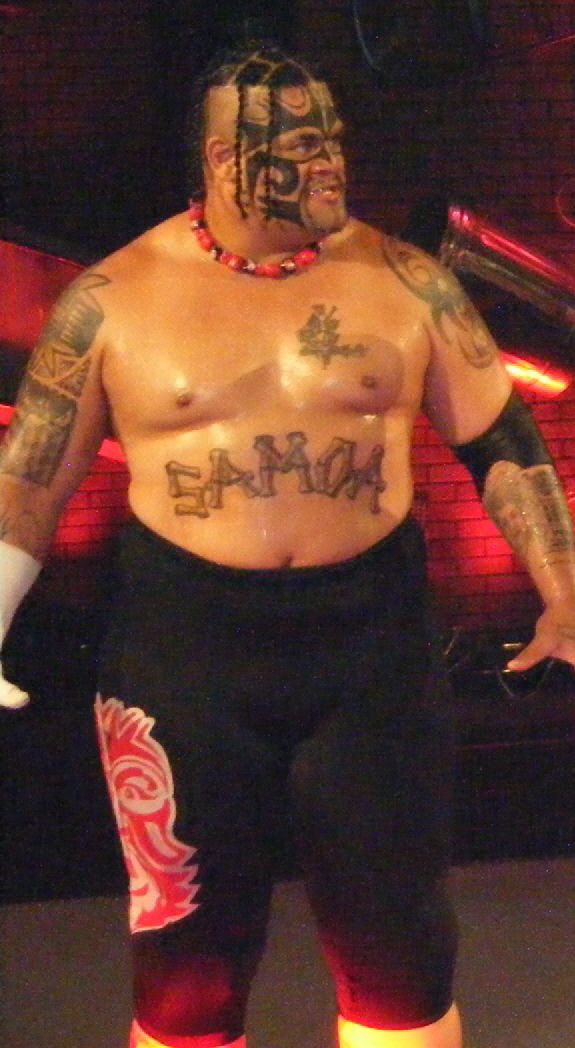
Umaga faced CM Punk

The opening match was between Umaga and CM Punk. The match was based around Umaga dominating Punk and neutralizing any attempt Punk made at offense. Punk was able to move out of the way of a diving headbutt off the top rope and then perform some offense maneuvers. At the end of the match, Umaga delivered a Samoan Spike for the pinfall victory over Punk.

Next up was the ECW Championship match between Christian and Jack Swagger. The match went back-and-forth with constant counters to each other's moves. This was followed by Christian attempting a Killswitch, only to have Swagger counter but Christian pulled down the straps from his singlet. Swagger then attempted a clothesline, but Christian ducked, caught him around the waist from behind, and rolled him to the mat, using the singlet he compromised for extra leverage, getting the pin.

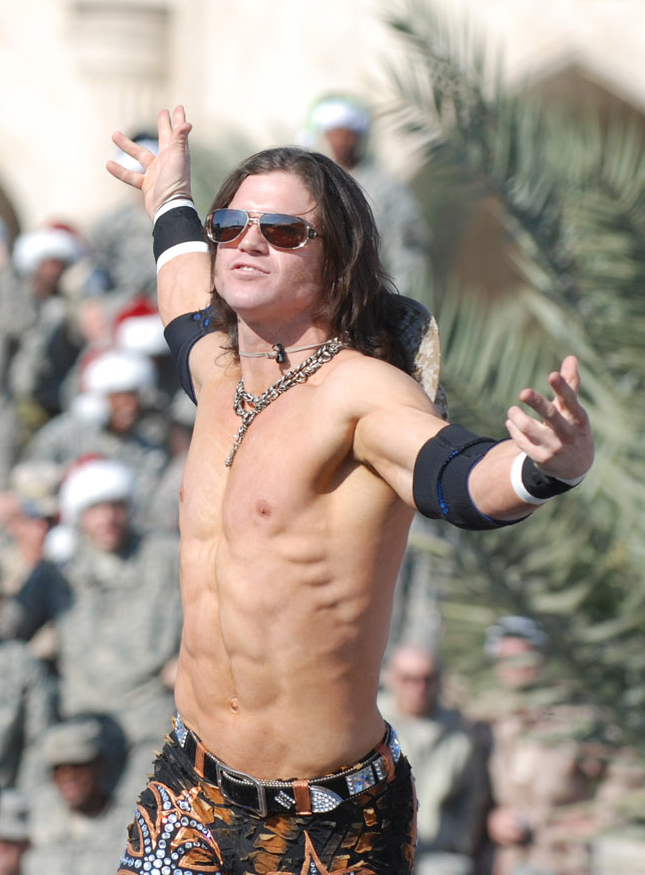
John Morrison defeated Shelton Benjamin

In the third match, John Morrison faced Shelton Benjamin (with Charlie Haas). Haas unsuccessfully attempted to interfere before Morrison halted the effort, and he ended the match by pinning Benjamin after a Starship Pain.

After this match, The Miz entered the ring and verbally berated the live crowd, insulting them and John Cena claiming, "He's like a lovable loser, much like the Chicago Cubs". He then turned his attention specifically to the Cubs' left fielder, Alfonso Soriano, who was in attendance, insulting him before being interrupted by Santino Marella, who took exception to The Miz's comments, leading to a fight between the two. The Miz got the better of his opponent, ending by delivering a DDT. Chavo Guerrero also came out to attack Marella after comments made by the latter about Guerrero's aunt Vickie Guerrero.

In the next match, Rey Mysterio defended the WWE Intercontinental Championship against Chris Jericho. At the start, both men attempted to throw each other out of the ring to get the advantage. Mysterio tried the 619, but Jericho stated before the match that he would make certain the 619 would not happen. At one point, both competitors sat on the top turnbuckle, and Jericho made an attempt to remove Mysterio's mask, only to be knocked away. Mysterio attempted a 619 but Jericho applied the Walls of Jericho. Mysterio won the match after the 619, followed by a Splash from the top rope to get the pin on Jericho.

=== Main event matches ===
The fifth match saw Batista challenge Randy Orton for the WWE Championship. The match focused around the two brawling: Orton kept Batista down with stomps and chinlocks but Batista delivered a spear. Orton spent the latter portion of the match trying to get himself disqualified by trying to use a steel chair and the WWE title belt as a weapon, as well as trying to get counted out, only to have Batista halt his efforts. After an attempt at the RKO was blocked, Orton ran into the referee and slapped him in the face. This was rendered a disqualification victory for Batista, due to Orton attacking an official. Per title match rules, Orton retained the championship, as the title cannot change hands on a disqualification unless stated otherwise. Following the match, Orton's protégés, Cody Rhodes and Ted DiBiase, came down to the ring and assaulted Batista until retired wrestler, Ric Flair, made his return to the company to aide Batista against his assailants. Batista was then able to deliver the Batista Bomb to Orton.

John Cena faced Big Show next on the card. In the early part of the match, Big Show performed various punches on Cena, but was ultimately countered by his opponent who attempted to apply the STF, but it was unable to be fully applied due to Big Show's size. Cena then delivered the Attitude Adjustment to Big Show for a pinfall victory.

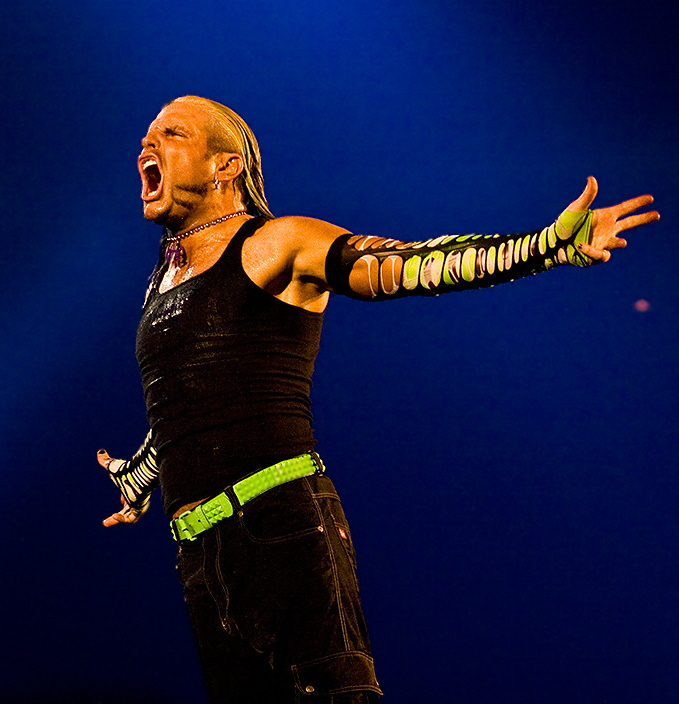
Jeff Hardy competed in the main event at Judgment Day

The main event saw Edge defend the World Heavyweight Championship against Jeff Hardy. The match kept a quick pace between the two, trying to gain the upper hand with a number of strikes and takedowns, as well as Hardy executing a Twist of Fate. The action would spill onto the floor, leading to both men positioned at the barricade surrounding the ring area. Hardy tried to run across it, and Edge stopped him with a spear through the barricade. Hardy set up the steel steps, ran up the steps and performed a heel kick on Edge, leading to both competitors crashing into the crowd over the barricade. Once Edge managed to return to the ring, Matt Hardy, came through the crowd and attacked Hardy with his cast (Jeff had broken Matt's hand in their previous encounter). At the end of the match, Edge delivered an Edgecution off the top rope, pinning Hardy to retain the title.

== Reception ==
The show received generally mixed reviews. Brian Elliot, writing for the Canadian Online Explorer's wrestling section, called it, "intriguing in more ways than one". He commented on how three of the company's big stars (Triple H, Shawn Michaels, and The Undertaker) were absent from the show; he also commented on the fact that all seven of the matches were singles matches and commented, "...there was hope that the better in-ring performers on the show would have the opportunity to wrestle – a rarity in today's over-the-top wrestling climate". The show was rated average, but "fun", with the highest score being 6.5/10 for Punk versus Umaga, the Intercontinental title match, and the World Heavyweight title match. Well-known wrestling journalist, Dave Meltzer, of the Wrestling Observer Newsletter, summarized the show by saying, "No great matches but six or seven matches were good to very good. A lot of good finishes." He also praised The Miz in speaking role, calling it the "best mic work Miz has ever done".

== Aftermath ==
=== Raw ===
Following Randy Orton's retention of the WWE Championship against Batista at Judgment Day by getting himself intentionally disqualified, Ric Flair, an associate of Batista's, announced on the May 18 episode of Raw that, as ordered by the Raw General Manager, Vickie Guerrero, Orton would face Batista in a Steel Cage match at Extreme Rules. This match stipulation would prevent both interference from outside parties and deliberate disqualifications.

Also, on the May 18 episode of Raw, it was announced that The Big Show would have a rematch with his Judgment Day opponent, John Cena at Extreme Rules as well; this time, however, the match was to be a submission match, which a wrestler can only win by forcing an opponent to submit.

=== ECW ===
After Christian retained the ECW Championship against Jack Swagger at Judgment Day, Swagger attacked Christian on the following episode of ECW and pushed him off the entrance ramp. Two days later, on Superstars, Swagger interfered in a title match between Christian and Tommy Dreamer, resulting in the match being ruled a no contest. On the May 26 episode of ECW, Swagger announced that he would have a rematch against Christian at Extreme Rules, but the ECW general manager, Tiffany, stated that Dreamer had been added to the match, making it a triple threat hardcore match, a match with no disqualifications or countouts, and the first man to score a pinfall or submission would win. As Dreamer's contract with the company was set to expire one day before the show, it was announced that he had signed a one-day extension to give him a chance at winning the title; if Dreamer were to fail to win the title, he would no longer wrestle for ECW.

=== SmackDown ===
On the SmackDown immediately following Judgment Day, SmackDown general manager, Theodore Long, felt that Edge's retention of the World Heavyweight Championship was questionable due to Matt Hardy's interference, so he declared that Jeff Hardy would have a rematch for the championship at Extreme Rules. Hardy and Edge had a match that night, with the stipulation that whoever won would be allowed to choose the stipulation for the match at Extreme Rules. Hardy won the match and chose a ladder match, which requires the competitors in the match to climb a ladder to obtain the title belt suspended over the ring in order to win.

After defeating CM Punk at Judgment Day, Umaga continued to attack Punk. He interfered in Punk's match with Chris Jericho on the May 22 episode of SmackDown, assaulting Punk with a leather strap and issuing a challenge to Punk for a Samoan strap match at Extreme Rules.

Following Mysterio's victory over Jericho at the event, Jericho went to SmackDown general manager, Theodore Long, and demanded a rematch for the title the next month at Extreme Rules. Long then announced that would happen in a No Holds Barred match at the event.

=== Legacy ===
The 2009 Judgment Day was the final Judgment Day event. It was discontinued and replaced by Over the Limit in 2010. Years later in 2022, Edge, who was featured on the poster of the 2009 Judgment Day event, formed a stable called The Judgment Day. The weighing scale that was featured on the 2009 poster also inspired the logo of the stable.

== Results ==
No.	Results	Stipulations	Times
1^{D}	Mickie James defeated Beth Phoenix (with Rosa Mendes) by pinfall	Singles match	06:13
2	Umaga defeated CM Punk by pinfall	Singles match	11:52
3	Christian (c) defeated Jack Swagger by pinfall	Singles match for the ECW Championship	09:33
4	John Morrison defeated Shelton Benjamin (with Charlie Haas) by pinfall	Singles match	10:10
5	Rey Mysterio (c) defeated Chris Jericho by pinfall	Singles match for the WWE Intercontinental Championship	12:39
6	Batista defeated Randy Orton (c) by disqualification	Singles match for the WWE Championship	14:44
7	John Cena defeated Big Show by pinfall	Singles match	14:57
8	Edge (c) defeated Jeff Hardy by pinfall	Singles match for the World Heavyweight Championship	19:56
(c) / – the champion(s) heading into the match; D / – this was a dark match
