= WWE Judgment Day =

World Wrestling Entertainment pay-per-view event series

- WWE Judgment Day 2009 logo
- Promotion: World Wrestling Entertainment
- Brands: Raw (2002–2003, 2007–2009); SmackDown (2002–2009); ECW (2007–2009)
- Other name: Judgment Day: In Your House
- First event: Judgment Day: In Your House
- Last event: 2009

WWE Judgment Day was a professional wrestling pay-per-view (PPV) event produced by World Wrestling Entertainment (WWE), a professional wrestling promotion based in Connecticut. It was first held as the 25th In Your House PPV in October 1998. The event was then brought back as its own PPV in May 2000, replacing Over the Edge, and subsequently became the annual May PPV until 2009. The 2002 event was the company's first PPV held under the WWE name, following a renaming of the company from World Wrestling Federation (WWF) to WWE earlier that same month. Judgment Day was discontinued after its 2009 event and was replaced by Over the Limit in 2010.

To coincide with the brand extension, the event was made exclusive to the SmackDown brand from 2004 to 2006. Following WrestleMania 23 in April 2007, brand-exclusive PPVs were discontinued.

== History ==
Judgment Day was first held as an In Your House pay-per-view (PPV) event. In Your House was a series of monthly PPVs first produced by the World Wrestling Federation (WWF, now WWE) in May 1995. They aired when the promotion was not holding one of its major PPVs and were sold at a lower cost. Judgment Day: In Your House was the 25th In Your House event and took place on October 18, 1998, at the Rosemont Horizon in Rosemont, Illinois.

The In Your House branding was retired following February 1999's St. Valentine's Day Massacre: In Your House. As a result of the death of WWF wrestler Owen Hart at 1999's Over the Edge PPV, which was held in May, the Over the Edge PPV chronology was canceled and Judgment Day was reinstated as its own PPV the following year, being held on May 21, 2000, at Freedom Hall in Louisville, Kentucky. This second Judgment Day event established Judgment Day as the promotion's annual May PPV.

In May 2002, the WWF was renamed to World Wrestling Entertainment (WWE) as a result of a lawsuit from the World Wildlife Fund over the "WWF" initialism. Judgment Day 2002 was in turn the very first PPV produced by the promotion to be held under the WWE name.

In March 2002, the promotion held a draft that split its roster into two distinctive brands of wrestling, Raw and SmackDown!, where wrestlers were exclusively assigned to perform—a third brand, ECW, was added in 2006. Both the 2002 and 2003 Judgment Day events featured wrestlers from both the Raw and SmackDown! brands. The 2003 event was also the final event to not be brand-exclusive until Backlash 2007. Judgment Day from 2004 to 2006 exclusively featured wrestlers from the SmackDown! brand. Following WrestleMania 23 in April 2007, WWE discontinued brand-exclusive PPVs, thus the events from 2007 to 2009 featured wrestlers from the Raw, SmackDown, and ECW brands. The 2009 event was the final Judgment Day PPV held, as the event was discontinued and replaced by Over the Limit in 2010.

In 2022, WWE reused the name for a stable called The Judgment Day.

== Events ==
SmackDown-branded event

#	Event	Date	City	Venue	Main event	Ref.
1	Judgment Day: In Your House	October 18, 1998	Rosemont, Illinois	Rosemont Horizon	The Undertaker vs. Kane for the vacant WWF Championship with Stone Cold Steve Austin as the special guest referee	
2	Judgment Day (2000)	May 21, 2000	Louisville, Kentucky	Freedom Hall	The Rock (c) vs. Triple H in a 60-minute Iron Man match for the WWF Championship with Shawn Michaels as the special guest referee	
3	Judgment Day (2001)	May 20, 2001	Sacramento, California	ARCO Arena	Stone Cold Steve Austin (c) vs. The Undertaker in a No Holds Barred match for the WWF Championship	
4	Judgment Day (2002)	May 19, 2002	Nashville, Tennessee	Gaylord Entertainment Center	Hollywood Hulk Hogan (c) vs. The Undertaker for the Undisputed WWE Championship	
5	Judgment Day (2003)	May 18, 2003	Charlotte, North Carolina	Charlotte Coliseum	Brock Lesnar (c) vs. Big Show in a Stretcher match for the WWE Championship	
6	Judgment Day (2004)	May 16, 2004	Los Angeles, California	Staples Center	Eddie Guerrero (c) vs. John "Bradshaw" Layfield for the WWE Championship	
7	Judgment Day (2005)	May 22, 2005	Minneapolis, Minnesota	Target Center	John Cena (c) vs. John "Bradshaw" Layfield in an "I quit" match for the WWE Championship	
8	Judgment Day (2006)	May 21, 2006	Phoenix, Arizona	US Airways Center	Rey Mysterio (c) vs. John "Bradshaw" Layfield for the World Heavyweight Championship	
9	Judgment Day (2007)	May 20, 2007	St. Louis, Missouri	Scottrade Center	John Cena (c) vs. The Great Khali for the WWE Championship	
10	Judgment Day (2008)	May 18, 2008	Omaha, Nebraska	Qwest Center Omaha	Triple H (c) vs. Randy Orton in a Steel Cage match for the WWE Championship	
11	Judgment Day (2009)	May 17, 2009	Rosemont, Illinois	Allstate Arena	Edge (c) vs. Jeff Hardy for the World Heavyweight Championship	
(c) – refers to the champion(s) heading into the match

== See also ==
- List of WWE pay-per-view events
- WWE Over the Limit
- WWF Over the Edge
