= WWE Judgment Day (2003) =

World Wrestling Entertainment pay-per-view event

Judgment Day
- Promotional poster featuring Booker T
- Promotion: World Wrestling Entertainment
- Brand(s): Raw; SmackDown!
- Date: May 18, 2003
- City: Charlotte, North Carolina
- Venue: Charlotte Coliseum
- Attendance: 13,000
- Buy rate: 317,000

Pay-per-view chronology
← Previous; Backlash	Next → Insurrextion

Judgment Day chronology
← Previous; 2002	Next → 2004

The 2003 Judgment Day was a professional wrestling pay-per-view (PPV) event produced by World Wrestling Entertainment (WWE). It was the fifth Judgment Day and took place on May 18, 2003, at the Charlotte Coliseum in Charlotte, North Carolina, held for wrestlers from the promotion's Raw and SmackDown! brand divisions. This was the last PPV outside of the "Big Four" (WrestleMania, SummerSlam, Survivor Series, and Royal Rumble) that was not brand-exclusive until Backlash 2007.

Eight professional wrestling matches were scheduled for the event which featured a supercard, a scheduling of more than one main bout. The first main match was from the SmackDown! brand, which was the card's main event, and featured WWE Champion Brock Lesnar defeating Big Show in a Stretcher match to retain the title after Rey Mysterio interfered, attacking Big Show. The second main match was from the Raw brand and was between Kevin Nash and World Heavyweight Champion Triple H, where Nash won by disqualification. Three other championship matches were featured on the undercard. The first match featured Raw's WWE Women's Champion Jazz defeat Victoria, Jacqueline, and Trish Stratus in a Fatal Four-Way match to retain the title. The next was a Battle Royal for the revived Intercontinental Championship on Raw, which Christian won. The final was between the team of Eddie Guerrero and Tajiri and Team Angle (Charlie Haas and Shelton Benjamin) in a ladder match for SmackDown!'s WWE Tag Team Championship, which Guerrero and Tajiri won.

== Production ==
=== Background ===
Judgment Day was a professional wrestling pay-per-view (PPV) event first held by World Wrestling Entertainment (WWE) as the 25th In Your House PPV event in October 1998. Following the discontinuation of the In Your House series in February 1999, Judgment Day was reinstated in May 2000 as its own PPV event, establishing Judgment Day as the promotion's annual May PPV. The fifth event was held on May 18, 2003, at the Charlotte Coliseum in Charlotte, North Carolina. It featured wrestlers from the Raw and SmackDown! brands.

=== Storylines ===
The event featured nine professional wrestling matches with outcomes predetermined by WWE script writers. The matches featured wrestlers portraying their characters in planned storylines that took place before, during and after the event. All wrestlers were from either one of WWE's brands – Raw or SmackDown! – the two storyline divisions in which WWE assigned its employees.

The main feud heading into Judgment Day on the SmackDown! brand was between Brock Lesnar and Big Show, with the two feuding over the WWE Championship. At Backlash, Big Show defeated Rey Mysterio and then attacked him as he was strapped onto a stretcher. On the May 1 episode of SmackDown!, Lesnar confronted Big Show about it while Big Show refused to face him. On the May 8 episode of SmackDown!, Big Show was set to team up with A-Train against Chris Benoit and Lesnar, as Lesnar challenged Big Show to a Stretcher match at Judgment Day for the WWE Championship. The FBI then locked Lesnar in his locker room as Big Show and A-Train defeated Benoit. Big Show tried to injure Benoit as he did to Mysterio but Lesnar saved him, only to get chokeslammed by Big Show. On the May 15 episode of SmackDown!, Big Show took Mysterio during an interview out to the ring to attack him once again, but Lesnar ran out and saved Mysterio.

The main feud on the Raw brand was between Triple H and Kevin Nash, with the two feuding over the World Heavyweight Championship. On the April 28 episode of Raw, Triple H and Ric Flair challenged Rob Van Dam and Kane for the World Tag Team Championship. Nash interfered wielding a sledgehammer and then chased Triple H out of the arena, as Triple H sped off in his car after Nash smashed in some of the car's windows. On the May 5 episode of Raw, both Nash and Triple H were guests of the Highlight Reel, Chris Jericho's talk show. Both men brawled all over the arena. Raw Co-General Managers "Stone Cold" Steve Austin and Eric Bischoff announced a World Heavyweight Championship match between Nash and Triple H at Judgment Day. On the May 12 episode of Raw, Nash fought against Jericho, and won after Shawn Michaels prevented Triple H and Flair from interfering. Nash then hit Triple H with the Jackknife Powerbomb.

The secondary feud on the SmackDown! brand was between Mr. America (Hulk Hogan) and Roddy Piper. After Hulk Hogan won against Vince McMahon at WrestleMania XIX, McMahon was so frustrated with him and wanted Hulkamania to die, so he indefinitely suspended Hogan and forced him to sit out the rest of his contract out of spite. For weeks after that, mysterious Mr. America promos began airing for weeks during SmackDown! shows. On the May 1 episode of SmackDown!, Mr. America debuted on a Piper's Pit segment. McMahon appeared and claimed that Mr. America was Hulk Hogan in disguise; Mr. America fired back by saying, "I am not Hulk Hogan, brother!" (lampooning Hogan's use of "brother" in his promos). McMahon couldn't fire Mr. America due to his iron-clad contract with General Manager Stephanie McMahon. On the May 8 episode of SmackDown!, McMahon said that he would prove that Mr. America was Hulk Hogan in order to fire him. He interviewed Hogan live via satellite from his home, but then was informed that Mr. America was in the building. Vince tried to rip the mask off Mr. America's face but Mr. America laid him out. On the May 15 episode of SmackDown!, Piper challenged Mr. America to a match at Judgment Day, but then Piper attacked Mr. America and his fan. Piper then pulled the prosthetic leg off the fan, who was revealed as Zach Gowen.

In October 2002 at No Mercy, Triple H defeated Kane to win the Intercontinental Championship while retaining his World Heavyweight Championship in a title unification match thus unifying the two titles. Afterwards, the Intercontinental Championship was retired. On the May 9 episode of Raw, co-General Manager "Stone Cold" Steve Austin reactivated the Intercontinental Championship and announced a battle royal for the vacated title at Judgment Day. It was also announced that any former Intercontinental Champion will be eligible to enter the battle royal. The winner of the battle royal will be announced as the new Intercontinental Champion.

== Event ==
Other on-screen personnel
Role:	Name:
English commentators	Jim Ross (Raw)
English commentators	Jerry Lawler (Raw)
English commentators	Michael Cole (SmackDown)
English commentators	Tazz (SmackDown)
Spanish commentators	Carlos Cabrera
Spanish commentators	Hugo Savinovich
Interviewers	Terri Runnels
Interviewers	Josh Mathews
Ring announcers	Howard Finkel (Raw)
Ring announcers	Tony Chimel (SmackDown)
Referees	Charles Robinson (Raw)
Referees	Nick Patrick (Raw)
Referees	Jack Doan (Raw)
Referees	Earl Hebner (Raw)
Referees	Chad Patton (Raw)
Referees	Jim Korderas (SmackDown)
Referees	Brian Hebner (SmackDown)
Referees	Mike Chioda (SmackDown)
Referees	Mike Sparks (SmackDown)
General managers	Eric Bischoff (Raw)
General managers	Stephanie McMahon (SmackDown!)

=== Sunday Night Heat ===
Before the event aired live on pay-per-view, The Hurricane defeated Steven Richards in a dark match.

=== Preliminary matches ===
In the first match, John Cena and The F.B.I. (Chuck Palumbo and Johnny Stamboli) (with Nunzio) faced Rhyno, Spanky, and Chris Benoit. In the end, Benoit applied the Crippler Crossface on Cena, distracting the referee, whilst Palumbo and Stamboli performed the Kiss of Death on Spanky. Palumbo pinned Spanky to win.

In the second match, Test and Scott Steiner (with Stacy Keibler) faced La Résistance (Sylvain Grenier and René Duprée). Test accidentally performed a Big Boot on Steiner, allowing Grenier and Dupree to perform the Bonsoir on Steiner. Dupree pinned Steiner to win.

In the third match, Eddie Guerrero and Tajiri faced Team Angle (Charlie Haas and Shelton Benjamin) in a ladder match for the WWE Tag Team Championship. After a back-and-forth match, Guerrero performed a Frog Splash off a ladder on Benjamin. Haas climbed a ladder, but Guerrero performed a Sunset Flip Powerbomb on Haas off the ladder. Benjamin tried to prevent Guerrero from retrieving the title belts, but Tajiri spat Green Mist at Benjamin, causing Benjamin to fall off the ladder. Guerrero retrieved the belts to win the match.

In the fourth match, Christian, Val Venis, Chris Jericho, Lance Storm, Test, Rob Van Dam, Kane, Goldust, and Booker T fought in a Battle royal for the vacant WWE Intercontinental Championship. Kane eliminated Storm. Other wrestlers eliminated Kane, leading to Kane re-entering the ring and performing Chokeslams on Venis, Test and Van Dam. Booker T eliminated Test. Goldust eliminated Venis. Jericho eliminated Van Dam after a Springboard Dropkick. Goldust performed Shattered Dreams on Jericho and Christian, but Booker T eliminated Goldust. Jericho and Christian double-teamed Booker T before Jericho attempted a Lionsault on Booker T, but Christian eliminated Jericho. Christian knocked down a referee with a Baseball Slide and Booker T performed a Superkick on Christian to eliminate Christian, but the elimination wasn't seen. Christian attacked Pat Patterson and hit Booker T with the belt. Christian eliminated Booker T as the referee was regaining consciousness to win the match and the title.

In the fifth match, Torrie Wilson faced Sable in a Bikini Contest, which was hosted by Tazz. After taking a poll from the audience, Tazz declared Torrie the winner. Afterwards, Torrie kissed Sable.

In the fifth match, Mr. America (with Zach Gowen) faced Roddy Piper (with Sean O'Haire). Vince McMahon interfered in the match, giving O'Haire a steel pipe. O'Haire attempted to hit Mr. America with the pipe, but Mr. America avoided O'Haire, causing O'Haire to hit Piper with the pipe instead. Mr. America pinned Piper after an Atomic Leg Drop to win the match.

=== Main event matches ===
In the sixth match, Triple H (with Ric Flair) faced Kevin Nash (with Shawn Michaels) for the World Heavyweight Championship. Before the match, Michaels and Flair fought into the backstage area. Triple H accidentally knocked down the referee with a Clothesline, allowing Triple H to attack Nash with a low blow. Triple H drove Nash into an exposed turnbuckle and performed a Pedigree on Nash for a near-fall. Triple H then grabbed a sledgehammer, intending to hit Nash with it, but was stopped by referee Earl Hebner. Triple H then hit Hebner with the sledgehammer and was disqualified, but retained the title. After the match, Nash performed a Big Boot and Jacknife Powerbomb on Triple H. Nash then attacked Flair and performed another Jacknife Powerbomb on Triple H, this time through an announce table.

The seventh match was a Fatal 4-Way match for the WWE Women's Championship between Jazz (with Theodore Long), Victoria (with Steven Richards), Jacqueline, and Trish Stratus. Jazz pinned Jacqueline after a DDT to win the match and retain the title.

In the main event, Brock Lesnar faced Big Show in a Stretcher match for the WWE Championship. Early in the match, Lesnar used the body board as a weapon on Big Show. Big Show then performed a Chokeslam on Lesnar and a Leg Drop on Lesnar, who was laid on the Body Board. After pushing Big Show onto a Stretcher, Lesnar went backstage. Rey Mysterio then interfered, performing a 619 on Big Show. Big Show performed a Clothesline on Mysterio before Lesnar drove a forklift out. Lesnar dove off the forklift onto Big Show before performing an F5, allowing Lesnar to place Big Show on a stretcher. Lesnar then used the forklift to drive Big Show across the yellow line to win the match and retain the title.

== Aftermath ==
While the 2003 Judgment Day featured wrestlers from both Raw and SmackDown!, the following year's event was made SmackDown!-exclusive. This 2003 event would also be the final event to not be brand-exclusive, not including the "Big Four" PPVs (Royal Rumble, WrestleMania, SummerSlam, and Survivor Series) until Backlash in 2007.

In an interview with Ariel Helwani which aired on the September 17, 2025 episode of The Ariel Helwani Show, Torrie Wilson admitted having strong disdain for her bikini contest with Sable which took place at the event, which she described as being "like that nightmare where you wake up in the middle of the night and you're at school naked."

== Results ==
No.	Results	Stipulations	Times
1^{H}	The Hurricane defeated Steven Richards	Singles match	2:58
2	John Cena and The F.B.I. (Chuck Palumbo and Johnny Stamboli) (with Nunzio) defeated Chris Benoit, Rhyno and Spanky	Six-man tag team match	3:55
3	La Résistance (Sylvain Grenier and René Duprée) defeated Scott Steiner and Test (with Stacy Keibler)	Tag team match	6:20
4	Eddie Guerrero and Tajiri defeated Team Angle (Charlie Haas and Shelton Benjamin) (c)	Ladder match for the WWE Tag Team Championship	14:10
5	Christian won by last eliminating Booker T	Battle Royal for the vacant WWE Intercontinental Championship	11:45
6	Torrie Wilson defeated Sable	Bikini Challenge	—
7	Mr. America (with Zach Gowen) defeated Roddy Piper (with Sean O'Haire)	Singles match	4:54
8	Kevin Nash (with Shawn Michaels) defeated Triple H (c) (with Ric Flair) by disqualification	Singles match for the World Heavyweight Championship	7:22
9	Jazz (c) (with Theodore Long) defeated Jacqueline, Trish Stratus and Victoria (with Steven Richards)	Fatal 4-Way match for the WWE Women's Championship	4:47
10	Brock Lesnar (c) defeated Big Show	Stretcher match for the WWE Championship	15:27
(c) / – the champion(s) heading into the match; H / – the match was broadcast prior to the pay-per-view on Sunday Night Heat

=== Battle royal ===
Elimination	Wrestler	Eliminated by
1	Lance Storm	Kane
2	Kane	Val Venis, Chris Jericho, Goldust, Christian, Test, & Booker T
3	Test	Booker T
4	Val Venis	Goldust
5	Rob Van Dam	Chris Jericho
6	Goldust	Booker T
7	Chris Jericho	Christian
8	Booker T	Christian
Winner:	Christian	
