= Spinebuster =

Professional wrestling move

A spinebuster is a professional wrestling move in which an opponent is grabbed by the waist and then slammed down back-first, in a type of powerslam. The standard variation starts with the wrestler facing their opponent and then grabs them around their waist, lifts them up, and then either slams the opponent down while landing on top of them, or tosses them forward on to their back.

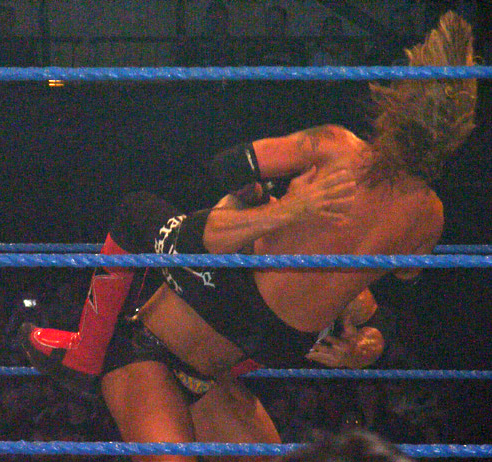
Dave Bautista giving a spinebuster to Edge during a live event

Although it can be used on a stationary opponent, it is usually performed against a charging opponent, using the opponent's own momentum to make the throw more powerful. It was invented and initially popularized by former WCW wrestler Arn Anderson.

== Variations ==
=== Double leg slam ===
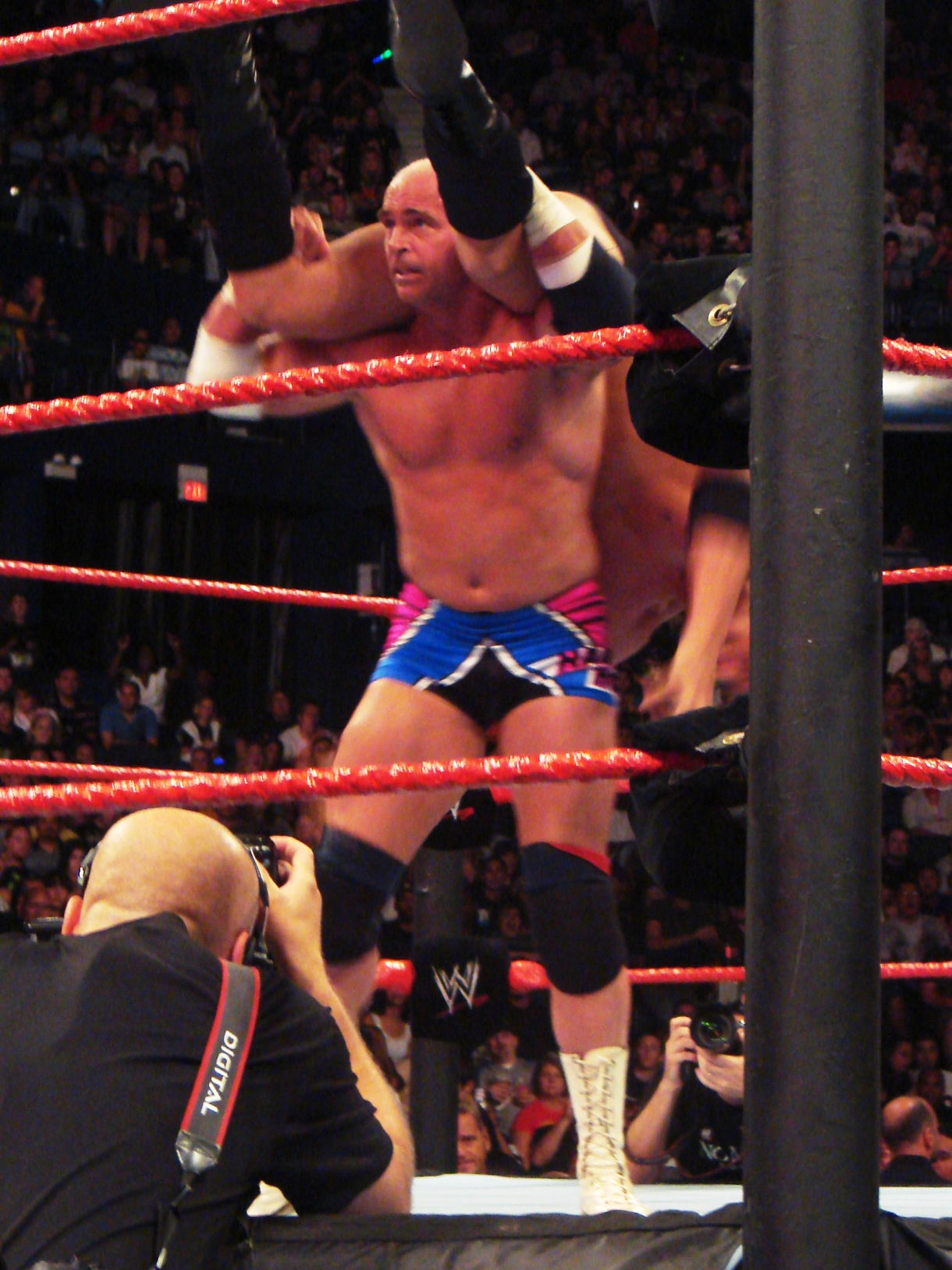
Hardcore Holly executing the Alabama Slam.

This variation of the spinebuster starts with the wrestler facing his opponent. The wrestler catches and grabs the opponent from either his waist or both legs, and lifts the opponent so he would either face the mat while being vertically elevated off the mat (with both his legs grabbed over the wrestler's shoulders) or literally facing the wrestler's back while being lifted upside down with the wrestler still taking hold of both the opponent's legs (back-to-belly position). The wrestler then tosses the opponent overhead by throwing both the opponent's legs forward, slamming the opponent back-first. A sitout version is also possible. This was popularized by both Hardcore Holly as the Alabama Slam, named after his fictional hometowns of Talladega and later Mobile, Alabama and the Big Boss Man as the Water-wheel Slam. Cody Rhodes has been using this as a signature move due to being trained by Hardcore Holly.

=== High-impact delayed spinebuster ===
Commonly used by Booker T as the 110th Street Slam, this variation closely resembles a double leg slam, but the wrestler simply lifts the opponent on one shoulder, rather than place their head in between the opponent's legs first.

=== Release spinebuster ===
The wrestler starts by facing their opponent and then grabs them around their waist, lifts them up and releases them back-first on the mat. It was used as a signature move by "Stone Cold" Steve Austin, who popularized it, and by Nia Jax afterwards.

=== Sitout spinebuster ===
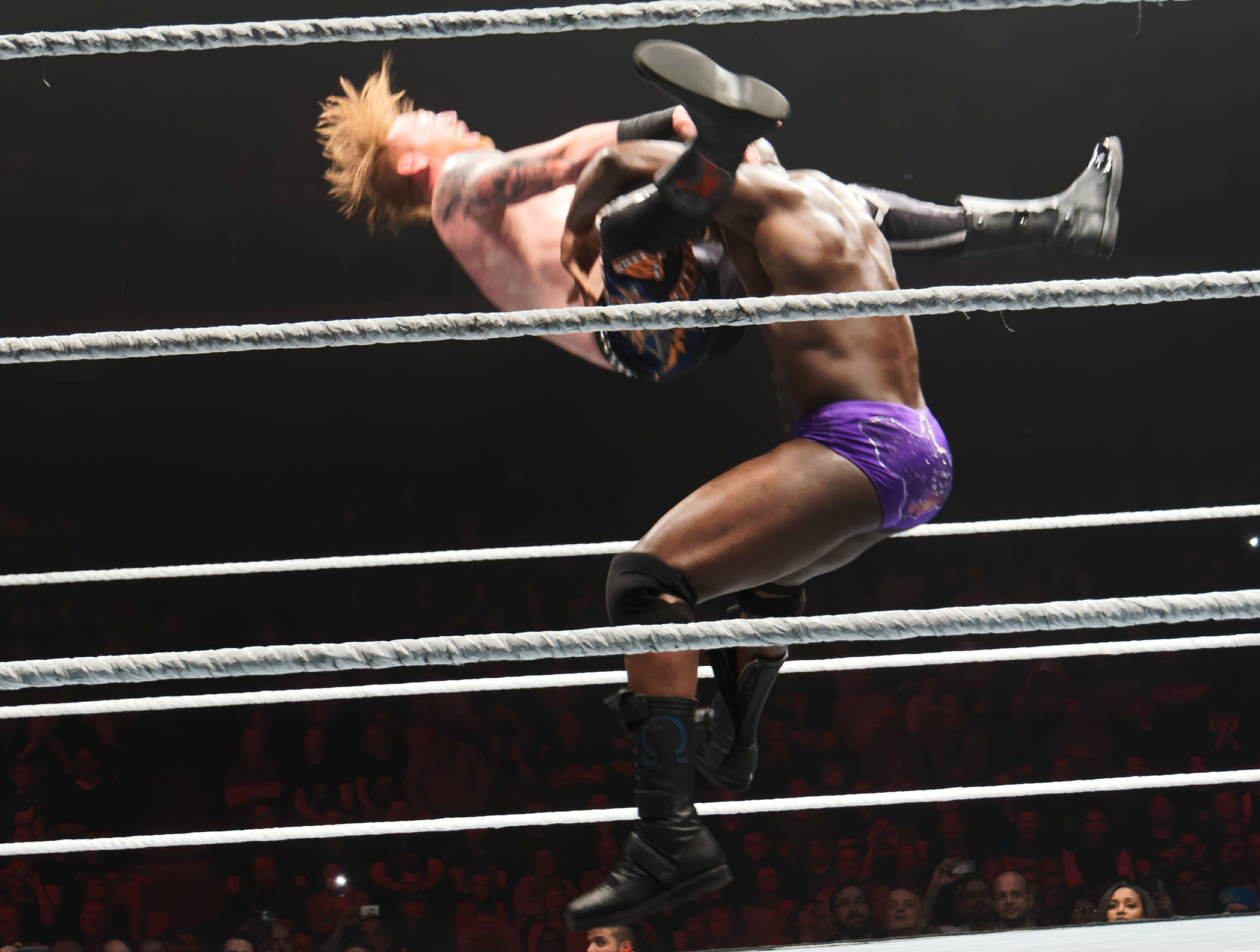
Titus O'Neil executing the Clash of the Titus (Sitout spinebuster) on Heath Slater

The wrestler starts by facing his opponent. He then grabs the opponent around the waist or under the arms, lifts him up, and tosses him forward on to his back or slams him down while dropping to a seated position. The wrestler hangs on to the opponents legs for a pin-fall attempt. This move is used as a finisher by Titus O'Neil who calls it the Clash of the Titus.

==== Side slam sitout spinebuster ====
A slight variation is the sitout side slam spinebuster where the opponent is lifted like a side slam but dropped into a sitout spinebuster. The late WWE wrestler Lance Cade used this move as a finisher.

==== Hammerlock spinebuster ====
This is a variation of the sitout spinebuster in which the wrestler hooks one of the opponents leg, then places his arms in a hammerlock position before slamming him down in a seated position. It was used as a finisher by WWE wrestler Lana.

=== Spinning spinebuster ===
This version of the spinebuster sees the wrestler lifting the opponent, turning 180°, and then slam him or her forward on to his or her back or slam him or her down while landing on top of him or her. It is usually performed against a charging opponent, using the opponent's own momentum to make the throw more powerful, but can also be performed against a stationary opponent. Innovated and popularized by Arn Anderson, this version is also known as a Double A Spinebuster in tribute to Anderson. Arn Anderson's son, Brock, has also started using this move after his AEW debut.

=== Lifting spinebuster ===
This variation of the spinebuster sees the attacker grabbing the opponent around the waist, lifting them up, and tossing them forward without landing on the top of the opponent.

==== Lifting sitout spinebuster ====
This variation sees the wrestler grabbing the opponent's hip with one arm and one of his legs with the other arm or either grabbing both of his hips before quickly lifting him upwards and slamming him down. Used as a finisher by D'Lo Brown, who called it Sky High, and as a signature by current WWE superstar Drew McIntyre, and former TNA wrestler Mahabali Shera. It was dubbed the Rydeen Bomb in Japan by Satoshi Kojima.

==== Thrust spinebuster ====
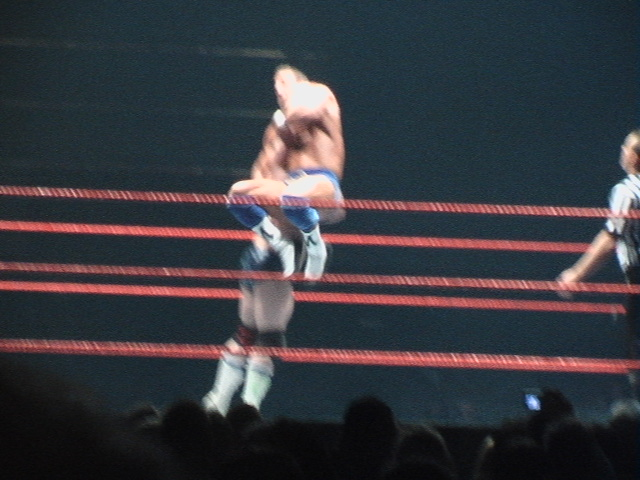
Eugene performing a thrust spinebuster

This is a variation of the lifting spinebuster that sees the wrestler lift the opponent by their waist as in the standard version, but then place their dominant hand onto the opponent's chest or throat in order to slam them while still standing, similarly to a chokeslam. Ron Simmons popularized it by using it as a finisher. Joe Hendry uses this move as a finisher called the Standing Ovation.

==== Side Slam spinebuster ====
This is another variation of the lifting spinebuster in which the wrestler stands besides his or her opponent, grabs their waist as in a side slam, and then hooks the opponent's leg with his or her free arm before lifting and slamming the opponent. It was also used by former Nexus member, David Otunga as The Verdict.

=== Gorilla press spinebuster ===
A gorilla press in which the user drops the opponent and turns them 90 degrees, dropping then onto their shoulder facing the opposite direction to the attacker, before being driven to the ground in a spinebuster maneuver. Goldberg used the move as a signature.

=== Pop-Up spinebuster ===
This move begins with either with the opponent rushing towards the attacker or with the attacker grabbing the opponent. The attacker then flings the opponent vertically up into the air before performing a spinebuster in a kneeling position. This was used as a signature move by former Impact wrestler Rachael Ellering.

=== Fireman's Carry Spinebuster ===
The wrestler lifts the opponent onto their shoulders, into the fireman's carry position. The wrestler grabs hold of the opponent's legs with both hands before either a spinebuster.

==== Fireman's Carry Thrust Spinebuster ====
A variation of the Fireman's Carry spinebuster, it begins with the wrestler lifting the opponent in a Fireman's Carry position, before grabbing one of his legs with an arm and grabbing his throat with the other before performing a release thrust spinebuster. Sometimes used by wrestler Moose.

==== Fireman's Carry Sitout spinebuster ====
It has an identical setup of the previously mentioned variation. When the wrestler is about to release the opponent, he grabs his sides with his hands and then proceeds to slam him down in a seated position. Grayson Waller uses this as a finisher.

=== Side Spinebuster ===
Also known as a waist-lift side slam, this move begins with the attacking wrestler facing an opponent that is slightly to their side before tucking their own head under their opponent's near arm, reaching their own near arm around their opponent's waist or lower abdomen, then bracing their other arm up against the opponent's hip or thigh. The wrestler then lifts their opponent up onto one shoulder, with the opponent's body roughly becoming both perpendicular to the attacking wrestler's spinal column and parallel to the mat (however, this does not always necessarily mean the opponent's body will actually be facing the mat such as in a double leg slam) before slamming them down. Former WWE wrestler Lars Sullivan used it as his finisher called the Freak Accident.

=== Running Spinebuster ===
It starts with two opponents about to charge each other. One of them charges against his opponent first while running before swiftly grabbing both of his legs and lifting him upwards before quickly slamming him in a kneeling position. Sometimes used by Claudio Castagnoli.

==== Turnbuckle Spinebuster ====
This is can be a variation of the running spinebuster or a move on its own. It starts with an opponent charging a wrestler, and when he tries to jump onto him for an attack, the wrestler hooks both of his legs, or one of his legs and his throat before performing a spinebuster onto the turnbuckle.

==== Ringpost-aided spinebuster ====
Thus variation sees a wrestler grabbing both of an opponent's legs or either catching an opponent mid-air before quickly running and slamming him in a spinebuster position against a ring-post.

=== Falling Spinebuster ===
This is mostly used as a tag team maneuver against a single opponents. It starts with two wrestlers facing a single opponent who is running towards them, the tag team partners then proceed to catch their opponent. One of them grabs one of his legs with one arm and puts his hand on the opponents chest, and so does his partner. Then they both forcibly push the opponent down, slamming him, while both fall on their sides.

=== Kneeling Spinebuster ===
One of the most common variations, it starts with a wrestler grabbing a non-charging opponent, hooking his hip and one of his legs with his arms before slamming him down while kneeling completely on the ground to apply more pressure.

=== Suplex Spinebuster ===
The move starts with a wrestler grabbing his opponent in a fisherman suplex hold. He then proceeds to lift the attacker high upon is head before violently slamming him down in a seated position.
