= Chuck Palumbo =

American professional wrestler (born 1971)

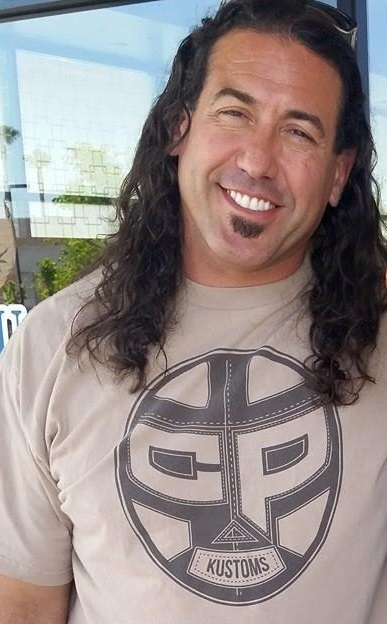
- Palumbo in 2015

Personal information
- Born: Charles Ronald Palumbo; June 15, 1971 (age 55) West Warwick, Rhode Island, U.S.
- Education: University of Central Missouri
- Children: 1

Professional wrestling career
- Ring name(s): Chuck; Chuck Palumbo; The Dude
- Billed height: 6 ft 7 in (201 cm)
- Billed weight: 280 lb (127 kg)
- Billed from: Providence, Rhode Island; San Diego, California
- Trained by: Paul Orndorff; WCW Power Plant
- Debut: 1998
- Retired: 2012

Charles Ronald Palumbo (born June 15, 1971) is an American retired professional wrestler. He is best known for his appearances with professional wrestling promotions World Championship Wrestling and the World Wrestling Federation/Entertainment (WWE) in the late-1990s and 2000s, where he held the WCW World Tag Team Championship and WWF/E World Tag Team Championship. He hosted the Discovery Channel series Lords of the Car Hoards and "Rusted Development".

== Early life ==
Chuck Palumbo grew up in West Warwick, Rhode Island. He attended West Warwick High School, where he earned all-state honors in basketball. He joined the US Navy soon after and spent time in the Persian Gulf, working the flight deck of the USS Carl Vinson. He was initially assigned to an F-18 Hornet squadron VAQ-34 at Lemoore, California before transferring to NAS Miramar in San Diego where he worked on the E-2C Hawkeye. Chuck finished up his stint in the Navy and enrolled at the Community College of Rhode Island earning All-American honors in basketball and a full scholarship to University of Central Missouri. While attending Central Missouri, watching a WCW TV show, he saw a commercial for the WCW PowerPlant. He called the number, and after graduating with a Criminal Justice degree, decided to accept their invitation to travel to Atlanta and train at the WCW Power Plant.

== Professional wrestling career ==
=== World Championship Wrestling (1998–2001) ===
==== Training and undercard (1998–1999) ====
Palumbo began his career in 1998 on the independent circuit, using a surfer gimmick and the ring name "The Dude". He made his debut appearance on World Championship Wrestling (WCW)'s Nitro on October 19, 1998, as a fan who accepted the challenge of Ernest "The Cat" Miller. Six months later, he was offered a training contract by WCW in April 1999. Just prior to the hiring of Vince Russo and Ed Ferrera as bookers for WCW, many of the WCW Power Plant wrestlers debuted on Saturday Night and WorldWide.

==== World Tag Team Champion (2000–2001) ====
On January 19, 2000, at WCW Saturday Night Taping (January '00 #3), Chuck Palumbo defeated Mike Sanders. On February 16, at WCW Saturday Night Taping (February '00 #4), Palumbo teamed with Sonny Siaki to defeat Allan Funk and Rick Cornell. On March 1, at WCW Saturday Night Taping (March '00 #1), Palumbo and Siaki challenged Big Vito and Johnny The Bull for the WCW World Tag Team Titles but was unsuccessful at winning the titles. On March 5, at WCW Live, Palumbo defeated Bobby Eaton. On March 14, at WCW WorldWide Taping' Chuck Palumbo was defeated by Lenny Lane. In 2000, Palumbo made his debut on WCW television on the March 21, 2000, edition of Thunder under his real name, losing to Scott Steiner. After this match, Palumbo was chosen by Bischoff and Russo to be The New Blood's version of Lex Luger in May 2000. He was given the nickname "The Main Event".

Palumbo feuded with Luger until late May 2000 when Palumbo formed a team called "The Perfect Event" with Shawn Stasiak and the pair won the WCW World Tag Team Championship. Their main feud was against KroniK (Brian Adams and Bryan Clark). In August, Stasiak and Palumbo helped form the Natural Born Thrillers with Mike Sanders, Sean O'Haire, Mark Jindrak, and Reno while they were briefly "coached" by Kevin Nash.

Palumbo and Stasiak won the WCW World Tag Team Championship two more times before splitting in early January 2001 when he and Stasiak won a tag team battle royal with O'Haire and Jindrak for a future tag team title shot. After the conclusion of the match Mike Sanders declared both teams victorious and that any combination of the four would face The Insiders (Diamond Dallas Page and Kevin Nash). Palumbo and O'Haire were the two members of the Natural Born Thrillers who would face and defeat Page and Nash for the tag titles at Sin on January 14, 2001. Following the title victory, the Natural Born Thrillers broke up when the team of Jindrak and Stasiak became jealous of Palumbo and O'Haire. The teams faced each other at SuperBrawl Revenge on February 18, 2001, for the tag team title, which Palumbo and O'Haire retained. The duo also retained the title against Totally Buffed (Buff Bagwell and Lex Luger) at Greed in March, WCW's last pay-per-view. On March 23, the World Wrestling Federation acquired the assets of WCW and Palumbo's contract was acquired. The following Monday on the final episode of Nitro, Palumbo and O'Haire defeated Team Canada's Mike Awesome and Lance Storm in the final WCW World Tag Team Championship title defense on the program.

=== New Japan Pro-Wrestling (2000) ===
On April 14, 2000, Chuck Palumbo made his NJPW debut, at NJPW Strong Energy '00 Day 1, where he defeated Black Cat. On April 15, at NJPW Strong Energy '00 Day 2, Palumbo teamed with Rick Cornell and Osamu Kido but was defeated by Brian Johnston, Junji Hirata and Tadao Yasuda in a 6 man tag match. On April 16, at NJPW Strong Energy '00 Day 3, Palumbo teamed with Rick Cornell, Dan Devine and Takashi Lazuka but was defeated by Hiro Saito, Hiroyoshi Tenzan, Super J and Tatsutoshi Goto in a 8 person tag match.

=== World Wrestling Federation/Entertainment (2001–2004) ===
==== The Alliance (2001) ====
Palumbo and O'Haire made their WWF debuts on the June 28, 2001, episode of SmackDown! as part of The Alliance, attacking the Hardy Boyz. O'Haire and Palumbo started feuding with the Acolytes Protection Agency (A.P.A.) in the following weeks, which ended at WWF Invasion on July 22, 2001, when the Acolytes Protection Agency defeated them. Subsequently, O'Haire and Palumbo defeated the Hardy Boyz on the August 2, 2001, edition of SmackDown!. O'Haire and Palumbo lost the WCW Tag Team Championship to the Brothers of Destruction (The Undertaker and Kane) on the August 9, 2001, edition of SmackDown! and lost their rematch for the tag-team gold in a steel cage match the following week on Raw. O'Haire and Palumbo's last televised match together was on the August 26 edition of Heat defeating the Holly Cousins (Hardcore and Crash).

O'Haire was sent to developmental territory Ohio Valley Wrestling in early September 2001, and Palumbo was thrown out of The Alliance on the October 25 edition of SmackDown! by storyline co-owner of The Alliance, Stephanie McMahon for questioning to attack Billy Kidman for losing the WCW Cruiserweight Championship. He joined the WWF in November.

==== Billy and Chuck (2001–2002) ====
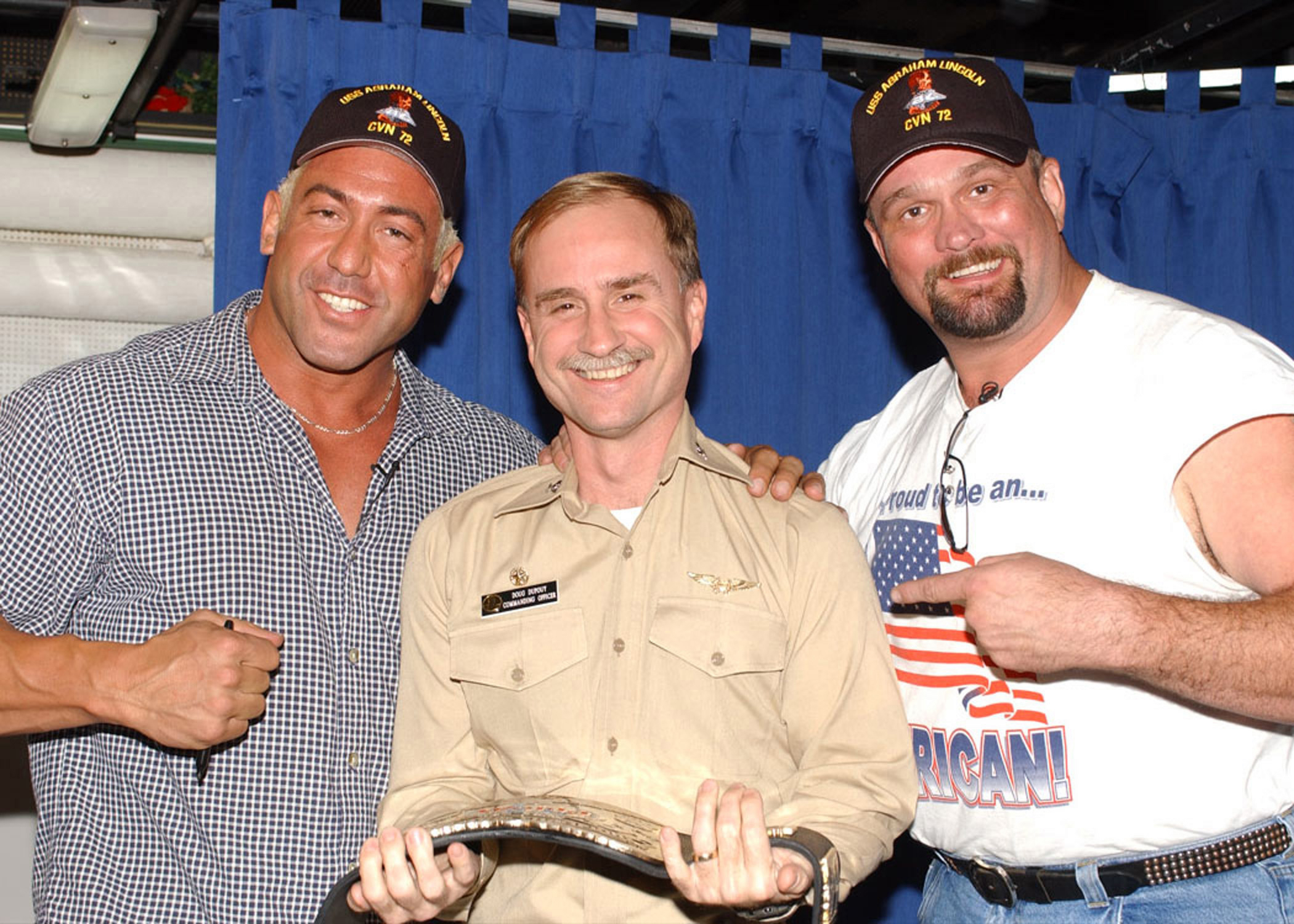
Palumbo (left) and Big Boss Man (right) present Captain Doug Dupuoy of the U.S. Navy a WWF Championship Belt in 2002

When he returned, Palumbo found a tag team partner in Billy Gunn. The pair started as a tag team working dark matches, but were later given a gimmick that saw the pair grow increasingly affectionate towards each other, showing evidence of a homosexual relationship. Palumbo became known simply as Chuck, and he bleached his hair blond to match Gunn's. Eventually, Palumbo cut off his long hair.

On the February 21, 2002, edition of SmackDown!, Billy and Chuck defeated Tazz and Spike Dudley to win the WWF Tag Team Championship. Palumbo made his WrestleMania debut at WrestleMania X8, when Billy and Chuck defend their titles in a Four corners elimination match against the APA, The Dudley Boyz, and The Hardy Boyz. They lost the tag team gold to Rikishi and their stylist Rico Constantino, who was forced to team with Rikishi on May 19, 2002, at Judgment Day. Less than a month later Rico helped Billy and Chuck recapture the title, but they later lost it to Edge and Hollywood Hulk Hogan.

In the second half of 2002, Billy and Chuck were the source of controversy when Chuck apparently proposed to Billy on September 5, 2002, edition of SmackDown! asking him to be his "partner for life". They had a marriage ceremony on the 2002 season premiere of SmackDown!. Just before they tied the knot, however, they revealed that the entire ordeal was a publicity stunt, and both characters disavowed their on-screen homosexuality. When Billy and Chuck decided not to go through with the marriage, Rico turned on them by helping Eric Bischoff and 3-Minute Warning attack the duo. Rico subsequently jumped to Raw as the manager of 3-Minute Warning, who beat Billy and Chuck at Unforgiven. Billy was injured in mid October 2002, and Chuck worked on Velocity for a few months using his original ring name Chuck Palumbo once again.

==== The Full Blooded Italians (2003–2004) ====
In February 2003, Palumbo formed the Full Blooded Italians (F.B.I.) in WWE, a faction which had previously been seen in Extreme Championship Wrestling (ECW). After a beating at the hands of Rikishi, Nunzio threatened to bring in his "family" in order to gain revenge. The next week, Palumbo and Johnny "The Bull" Stamboli joined Nunzio to form the F.B.I. and attacked Rikishi. This version initially gained little success, but would go on to have brief feuds with Los Guerreros, Chris Benoit, Rhyno, Brian Kendrick, Nathan Jones, the APA, and The Undertaker.

Palumbo was traded to the Raw brand on March 22, 2004, along with A-Train in exchange for Rico and Jackie Gayda. After Palumbo was traded to the Raw brand, he was kept off television until July 2004, when he debuted with a new look and entrance music. His new image resembled a cross between an auto mechanic and a greaser. He would later give himself the nickname "Custom Chucky P." It was not long before Palumbo was a regular on Sunday Night Heat. His new gimmick started off usually losing matches but began to rise on Heat, defeating the likes of The Hurricane, Rosey, Val Venis and Stevie Richards. On the October 31, 2004, airing of Heat, Palumbo had his most high-profile match on the Raw brand when he faced former World Heavyweight Champion Chris Benoit, but was defeated. Palumbo was released by WWE soon after on November 4, 2004.

=== Independent circuit (2005–2006) ===
Palumbo, along with Johnny Stamboli, went on to become a member of Voodoo Murders of All Japan Pro Wrestling (AJPW) and feuded against Roughly Obsess and Destroy. Palumbo teamed with former FBI partner Stamboli to challenge for the World Tag Team Championship on March 20, 2005, but were defeated by Jamal and Taiyo Kea of RO&D.

Stamboli and Palumbo's next stop would be with the Nu-Wrestling Evolution promotion in Italy, where the pair reformed the FBI. The duo also made appearances in a World Wrestling Council show where they challenged Último Dragón, Místico, and Negro Casas, in a tag team match which they would win by securing both the first and third falls. In early 2006, he made appearances in Mexico for Toryumon Mexico.

=== Return to WWE (2006–2008) ===
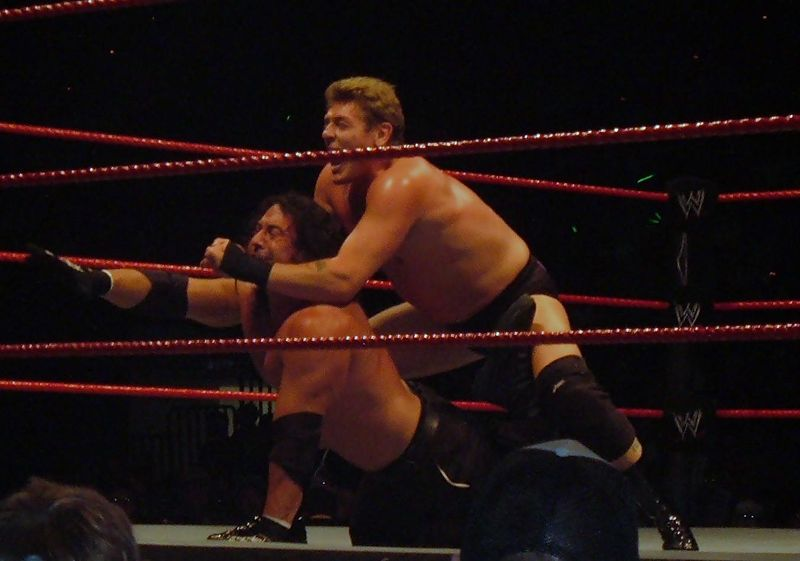
William Regal (top) and Chuck Palumbo competing at a Raw house show in 2007

In March 2006, Palumbo re-signed with the WWE and began working house shows and dark matches over the next year. Palumbo officially returned on the May 25, 2007, edition of Heat with a biker gimmick, and defeated Charlie Haas. He then continued making appearances on Heat, where he consistently defeated jobbers. In an interview with WWE.com, Palumbo claimed that the biker character was not a gimmick and that he works on bikes two or three times a week. On July 6, 2007, Palumbo made his SmackDown! re-debut, defeating Kenny Dykstra in his return match.

Palumbo began an on-screen relationship with Michelle McCool, whom he teamed with to defeat Dykstra and Victoria in a mixed tag team match. He then feuded with Jamie Noble, after Noble made advances towards McCool. After a series of matches between the men, Noble won a date with McCool by defeating Palumbo. Palumbo accidentally elbowed McCool during a match, causing her to suffer a storyline concussion. The partnership was dissolved when McCool refused to accept his apology the following week. Palumbo vowed to get revenge on Noble, and defeated Noble the following week.

Palumbo participated in the Royal Rumble match, where he eliminated Jamie Noble. He next appeared at WrestleMania XXIV, taking part in a 24-man Interpromotional Battle Royal to crown a number one contender to the ECW Championship, where he also eliminated Noble. During a series of house shows in June 2008, Palumbo challenged Matt Hardy for the United States Championship, though he was unsuccessful in winning the championship. As part of the 2008 WWE Supplemental Draft, Palumbo was drafted to the Raw brand. He never made his return to the brand however, as he was released from his WWE contract on November 7, 2008.

=== Later career (2008–2012) ===
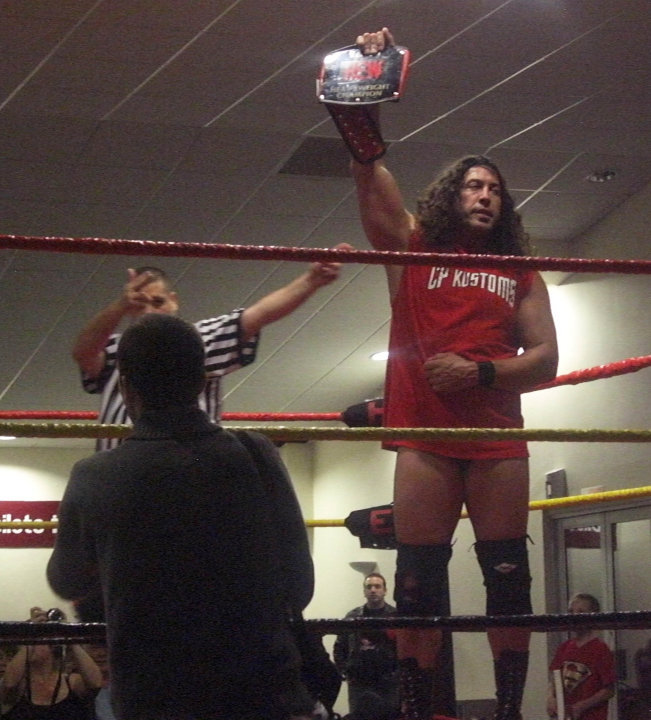
Palumbo with the HEW Heavyweight Championship

Palumbo returned to Mexico to team with Damián 666 and Konnan in a losing effort against D-Generation MEX at Wrestling in Tijuana on December 25, 2008. He also teamed with Konnan in World Wrestling Association. Palumbo wrestled for Ultimo Dragon's Toryumon promotion and competed in the IWL World Title Tournament in Mexico as well.

He returned to Nu-Wrestling (now named New Wrestling Entertainment, and located in France) in September 2009, and feuded with Mr. Anderson. Palumbo, Anderson and Tiny Iron competed in a triple threat for the vacant NWE Heavyweight Championship, which Anderson won. Palumbo challenged Anderson to a match for the championship on October 3, 2009, but was defeated.

On November 13, 2009, Palumbo won the Herts and Essex Wrestling (HEW) Heavyweight Championship from Brett Meadows in Braintree, England. He is the first American to hold the British promotion's championship. However, he lost the championship back to Meadows two days later in Colchester, England following interference from Sam Knee and Britani Knight.

In an interview with Hit The Ropes Radio, Palumbo confirmed he was in talks with TNA to sign with the company, though he opted not to sign. Palumbo wrestled his final match on January 8, 2012 at Future Stars Wrestling's New Years Resolution event where he defeated Jayson Cash. His final match was teaming with FBI member Johnny Stamboli losing to former tag partner Billy Gunn and Hector Garza at Feria Nayarit in Tepic, Mexico on March 27, 2012. After this, he quietly retired, and confirmed to Bill Apter in a 2014 interview that his wrestling career was over.

== Other endeavors ==
Palumbo runs a business called CP Kustoms, where he builds his own motorcycles, as well as repairing and customizing cars and motorcycles. A Palumbo-made motorcycle was featured in the April issue of American Iron Magazine. In 2009, Palumbo built a motorcycle to raise money for veterans returning home. He rode the bike across the country to gather donations and raffles, with 100% of the proceeds going to Fueled by the Fallen, a nonprofit that supports troops after they return home.

In 2006 Palumbo learned how to play guitar, and now plays in his own band, 3 Spoke Wheel. Using the same theme as CP Kustoms, he opened up Chuck Palumbo's Garage Gym, where he teaches cross-fit classes.

In 2014, he began co-hosting the Discovery Channel's Lords of the Car Hoards with custom car builder Rick Dore. The show focuses on SLAM garage, the garage Dore and Palumbo co-own, to fix and customize cars and motorcycles. For the second season the show was renamed Rusted Development.

== Personal life ==
Palumbo's brother, Chris, was awarded several medals for his military service in Afghanistan including the Distinguished Service Cross. Palumbo is good friends with fellow professional wrestlers Batista, Mark Jindrak, Booker T, Chavo Guerrero Jr. and Rey Mysterio. He was also close to his former tag partner Sean O'Haire, who died September 8, 2014.

Palumbo currently resides in San Diego, California. He has a daughter named Charli, who is an aspiring DJ. Palumbo also served as a police officer in National City from 2016 to 2022.

== Championships and accomplishments ==
- Herts and Essex Wrestling
  - HEW Heavyweight Championship (1 time)
- Pro Wrestling Illustrated
  - Tag Team of the Year (2002) – with Billy
  - PWI ranked him No. 37 of the top 500 singles wrestlers in the PWI 500 in 2002
- Toryumon
  - Yamaha Cup (2006) – with Johnny Stamboli
- World Championship Wrestling
  - WCW World Tag Team Championship (4 times) – with Shawn Stasiak (3) and Sean O'Haire (1)
- World Wrestling Federation / World Wrestling Entertainment
  - WWF/E Tag Team Championship (2 times) – with Billy

== See also ==
- The Alliance
- Billy and Chuck
- The Full Blooded Italians
- Lords of the Car Hoards
- The Natural Born Thrillers
- The New Blood
- The Perfect Event
