= Lords of the Car Hoards =

- Also known as: Rusted Development
- Genre: Reality show Automotive restoration
- Starring: Chuck Palumbo; Rick Dore; Benny Flores; Lucas Oswald
- Country of origin: United States
- Original language: English
- No. of seasons: 2
- No. of episodes: 12

Production
- Camera setup: Multicamera setup
- Production company: Discovery Studios

Original release
- Network: Discovery Channel
- Release: March 17, 2014 – October 12, 2015

Lords of the Car Hoards is an American reality cable television series which debuted on the Discovery Channel on March 17, 2014.

== Overview ==
The show documents the efforts of Chuck Palumbo (a former WWE wrestler and mechanic) and his partner Rick Dore (a custom car and hot rod builder) as they locate and then clean up the collection of a car hoarder with the main idea being to get classic cars and parts back into the realm of public use and display. The show starts with a tip regarding the location of a collection of vehicles then proceeds to the guys investigating the collection for the potential of the collection in terms of value and worthiness for a restoration candidate. Once a meeting with the owner takes place, a vehicle is selected for restoration and a deal is struck for the restoration of that vehicle while all the others plus any parts are sold to finance the overall effort. Joe Petralia replaced by Roy Wong "the money" in season 2 is challenged with the task of selling off the excess cars & parts to raise the capital for Rick and Chuck to finish the builds. Some of the vehicles are sold whole as collectibles to other mechanics or restorers, some for parts and the rest for scrap metal in order to raise the money necessary to rebuild and renovate the car hoarders' choice so that the owner may enjoy driving it in the future. The left over money goes toward paying the associated costs of operating a restoration shop. Each show continues by showing the basic design process for the vehicle which is followed by disassembly, modifications and then reassembly of the vehicle. The show wraps up with a presentation to the owner of their restored vehicle and an overview of what it took financially to accomplish all that was done from beginning to end with the hoard.

The show is also shown on Discovery UK a week later than the US, renamed Extreme Car Hoarders for the overseas market. In Italy it is broadcast on DMAX as "Due macchine da soldi" ("Two money machines", a pun with the word "machine" which can be used as a synonym of "car"). As of September 2015, the Discovery Channel aired the second season with the new title of "Rusted Development".

== Episodes aired ==
=== Season 1 ===
- "A Hoarder, A Van and a Plan" (first aired March 17, 2014)
- "Pickups and Slams" (first aired March 24, 2014)
- "What's a Partner For?" (first aired March 31, 2014)
- "Dude, Where's My Merc?" (first aired April 7, 2014)
- "Pure American Muscle" (first aired April 14, 2014)
- "Street Legal" (first aired April 21, 2014)

=== Season 2 ===
- "The Almond Lord" (first aired September 7, 2015)
- "Bird Up" (first aired September 14, 2015)
- "Hemi Hideaway" (first aired September 21, 2015)
- "Lords of the Zephyr" (first aired September 28, 2015)
- "A Fair Amount of Clutter (Part 1)" (first aired October 5, 2015)
- "All or Nothing / Going For Broke (Part 2)" (first aired October 12, 2015)
