= WWF Backlash (2002) =

World Wrestling Federation pay-per-view event

Backlash
- Promotional poster featuring Triple H
- Promotion: World Wrestling Federation
- Brand(s): Raw; SmackDown!
- Date: April 21, 2002
- City: Kansas City, Missouri
- Venue: Kemper Arena
- Attendance: 12,489
- Buy rate: 400,000
- Tagline: One Man's Journey to Stand Alone

Pay-per-view chronology
← Previous; WrestleMania X8	Next → Insurrextion

Backlash chronology
← Previous; 2001	Next → 2003

The 2002 Backlash was a professional wrestling pay-per-view (PPV) event produced by the World Wrestling Federation (WWF, now WWE). It was the fourth annual Backlash and took place on April 21, 2002, at Kemper Arena in Kansas City, Missouri, held for wrestlers from the promotion's Raw and SmackDown! brand divisions. The concept of the event was based on the backlash from WrestleMania X8.

This was the WWF's first PPV event to be held at Kemper Arena since Over the Edge in May 1999, in which Owen Hart, competing as The Blue Blazer, died after falling 78 feet from a harness to the ring. It was the company's first PPV event held following the introduction of the brand split the previous month. It was also the final Backlash held during the Attitude Era and under the WWF name, as the promotion was renamed to World Wrestling Entertainment (WWE) the following month.

Nine professional wrestling matches were scheduled on the event's card. The main match from the SmackDown! brand featured Hollywood Hulk Hogan defeating Triple H to win the Undisputed WWF Championship, and the featured match from the Raw brand was an encounter between The Undertaker and "Stone Cold" Steve Austin in a match to determine the number one contender to the Undisputed WWF Championship with Ric Flair as the special guest referee, which The Undertaker won. The other main match from Raw was a singles match for the Intercontinental Championship between Rob Van Dam and Eddie Guerrero, which Guerrero won by pinfall to win the championship.

== Production ==
=== Background ===
Backlash is a professional wrestling pay-per-view (PPV) event that was established by the World Wrestling Federation (WWF, now WWE) in 1999. The concept of the pay-per-view is based around the backlash from WWF's flagship event, WrestleMania. The fourth event featured the backlash from WrestleMania X8 and was scheduled to take place on April 21, 2002, at Kemper Arena in Kansas City, Missouri. This was the first event to be held at Kemper Arena since Over the Edge in 1999, in which Owen Hart, competing as The Blue Blazer, died after falling 78 feet from a harness to the ring.

In March 2002, the WWF introduced the brand extension in which the roster was divided between the Raw and SmackDown! brands, which is where wrestlers were exclusively assigned to perform on the respective weekly television programs, Raw and SmackDown! The 2002 Backlash was in turn the promotion's first PPV held following the implementation of the original brand split, and it featured wrestlers from both brands.

=== Storylines ===
The event featured nine professional wrestling matches with outcomes predetermined by WWF script writers. The matches featured wrestlers portraying their characters in planned storylines that took place before, during, and after the event. All wrestlers were from both of the WWF's brands—Raw or SmackDown!—the two storyline divisions in which the WWF assigned its employees.

The main feud leading into Backlash on the SmackDown! brand involved Undisputed WWF Champion Triple H and Hollywood Hulk Hogan over the Undisputed WWF Championship. On the April 4 episode of SmackDown!, Mr. McMahon named Hogan the number one contender to the title at Backlash. Later that night, Hogan came out in red and yellow for the first time since returning to the WWF to talk about the match, with Triple H saying he would not back down. On the April 11 episode of SmackDown!, Hogan came out to help Edge chase off Chris Jericho and Kurt Angle after Edge fought Jericho. Later on, Triple H fought against Angle as Jericho interfered. Hogan came out to help Triple H win the match, only for Angle to push Triple H into Hogan after the match, making Hogan attack Triple H, and get taken out by Jericho and Angle. On the April 18 episode of SmackDown!, Hogan confronted Jericho as Angle came to help Jericho, prompting Edge to run for the save. In the main event, Jericho and Angle fought Hogan and Triple H, as Hogan accidentally hit Triple H with a steel chair. After the match, Triple H hit Hogan with the chair. On the same night, it was confirmed that if Triple H lost his title match, he would be drafted to the SmackDown! brand.

The main feud on the Raw brand featured The Undertaker and "Stone Cold" Steve Austin to determine the number one contender to the Undisputed WWF Championship. On the April 1 episode of Raw, Ric Flair presented Triple H a new singular title belt to replace the two belts that had represented the undisputed championship up to that point, only for The Undertaker to challenge Triple H to a title match at Backlash. The same night, Austin decided to sign with the Raw brand, but he gave the Stone Cold Stunner to both Flair, and Mr. McMahon. On the April 8 episode of Raw, The Undertaker confronted Flair about McMahon making the title match for Backlash, making Austin come out, and confronting him. Flair booked two number one contender's matches, the first being The Undertaker versus Rob Van Dam, and the second being Austin versus Scott Hall; the winners would face each other at Backlash for the number one contendership. Austin and The Undertaker won their respective matches; however, as Flair helped to chase X-Pac from Austin's match, Austin stunned him again. On the April 15 episode of Raw, Flair fined Austin $5,000 and announced that he would be the special guest referee for the match at Backlash. Hall and X-Pac came to attack Austin, making Flair book Austin and Bradshaw against Hall, X-Pac and The Undertaker in the main event. After the match, which The Undertaker's team won, The Undertaker attacked Austin with a steel chair.

== Event ==
Other on-screen personnel
Role:	Name:
English commentators	Jim Ross
English commentators	Jerry Lawler
Spanish commentators	Carlos Cabrera
Spanish commentators	Hugo Savinovich
Backstage interviewers	Michael Cole
Backstage interviewers	Jonathan Coachman
Ring announcer	Howard Finkel
Referees	Mike Chioda
Referees	Charles Robinson
Referees	Theodore Long
Referees	Earl Hebner
Referees	Tim White
Referees	Jim Korderas

Before the event aired live on pay-per-view, a match took place on a live edition of Sunday Night Heat, in which Big Show defeated Steven Richards, and Justin Credible in a handicap match.

=== Preliminary matches ===
The first match was for the WWF Cruiserweight Championship between Billy Kidman, and Tajiri (with Torrie Wilson). In the end, Kidman attempted a Powerbomb on Tajiri, who spat red mist at Kidman, and pinned Kidman to win the title.

The second match was between Scott Hall (with X-Pac), and Bradshaw (with Faarooq). Bradshaw executed a Clothesline from Hell on Hall, but X-Pac placed Hall's foot on the bottom rope to void the pinfall. Bradshaw punched X-Pac, and Faarooq tackled X-Pac into the Ring Post. Whilst the referee was distracted, Hall performed a low blow on Bradshaw, and pinned Bradshaw with a roll-up to win the match.

In the third match, Jazz faced Trish Stratus for the WWF Women's Championship. Jazz forced Stratus to submit to an STF to win the match, and retain the title.

The fourth match was between Brock Lesnar (with Paul Heyman), and Jeff Hardy (with Lita). Lesnar dominated the match until Hardy performed Whisper in the Wind on Lesnar. Hardy performed a Swanton Bomb on Lesnar for a near-fall. Hardy attempted to hit Lesnar with a chair, but Lesnar ducked and performed an F5, followed by three Powerbombs on Hardy. The referee declared Lesnar the winner via technical knockout.

The fifth match was between Edge and Kurt Angle. After a back-and-forth match, Edge performed an Edgecution on Angle for a near-fall. Angle attempted an Angle Slam on Edge but Edge countered the move and performed a German Suplex on Angle. Edge performed a Diving Crossbody on Angle outside the ring. Edge attempted a second Edgecution on Angle but Angle countered the move into an Angle Slam for a near-fall. Angle applied an Ankle Lock on Edge but Edge countered into a roll-up for a near-fall. After Angle missed a chair shot, Edge performed an Edge-O-Matic on Angle for a near-fall. Edge attempted a Spear on Angle, who countered and pinned Edge after another Angle Slam to win the match.

The sixth match was for the WWF Intercontinental Championship between Rob Van Dam and Eddie Guerrero. After a back-and-forth match, Guerrero retrieved the title and attempted to attack Van Dam with the belt, who kicked and kicked Guerrero, knocking the referee down. Guerrero performed a Neckbreaker onto the belt on Van Dam and pinned Van Dam after a Frog Splash to win the title.

=== Main event matches ===
The seventh match was to determine the #1 contender to the Undisputed WWF Championship at Judgment Day with Ric Flair as the special guest referee between The Undertaker and "Stone Cold" Steve Austin. After a back-and-forth match, Austin brawled with The Undertaker at ringside. Austin attempted a Piledriver on The Undertaker, who countered with a Back Body Drop and pushed Austin into his motorbike. After Flair was knocked down, Austin performed a Stone Cold Stunner on The Undertaker. After Flair was knocked down again, The Undertaker performed a low blow on Austin and a Chokeslam on Austin for a near-fall. The Undertaker attempted to hit Austin with a chair but Flair grabbed the chair, allowing Austin to perform a low blow on The Undertaker. Austin attempted a Stone Cold Stunner on The Undertaker but The Undertaker countered, during which Flair was knocked down again. The Undertaker hit Austin with the chair for a near-fall. Austin attempted to hit The Undertaker with the chair but The Undertaker performed a Big Boot into the chair, which struck Austin. The Undertaker pinned Austin to win the match, but Flair had not seen Austin's foot on the bottom rope.

The eighth match was for the WWF Tag Team Championship between Billy and Chuck (with Rico) and Maven and Al Snow. After Rico distracted Snow, Snow chased Rico. Billy pinned Maven, after a Superkick from Chuck, to win the match and retain the title.

The main event was for the Undisputed WWF Championship between Triple H and Hollywood Hulk Hogan. After a back-and-forth match, Triple H applied a Figure Four Leglock on Hogan, who fought out of the hold. Hogan performed a Big Boot and a Running Leg Drop on Triple H. Hogan attempted a pin but Chris Jericho pulled the referee out of the ring. Jericho hit Hogan with a chair but Triple H performed a Facebreaker Knee Smash and a Clothesline on Jericho, knocking Jericho out of the ring. Hogan performed another Big Boot on Triple H and attempted another Running Leg Drop but Triple H avoided the move and performed a Pedigree on Hogan. Triple H attempted a pin but The Undertaker attacked the referee. The Undertaker hit Triple H with a chair but Hogan performed a Clothesline on The Undertaker, knocking The Undertaker out of the ring. Hogan pinned Triple H after another Running Leg Drop to win the match and the title.

== Aftermath ==
The 2002 Backlash would be the final Backlash held under the WWF name. On May 6, 2002, the WWF was renamed to World Wrestling Entertainment (WWE) due to a lawsuit from the World Wildlife Fund over the "WWF" initialism.

The night after Backlash, Big Show betrayed "Stone Cold" Steve Austin in a tag team match against the nWo, and joined the stable. Over the next two weeks, Big Show explained it was because he felt Austin took a main event spot at WrestleMania away from him; at WrestleMania 2000, Big Show challenged for the WWF Championship while Austin had neck surgery, but the following year at WrestleMania X-Seven, Austin competed in the main event for the WWF Championship, while Big Show did not, and at WrestleMania X8, Austin was scheduled for a match against Scott Hall while Big Show was at WWF New York in Times Square. On the May 6 episode of Raw, Austin, and Bradshaw united with Ric Flair in a battle against the nWo stable, but Flair betrayed both wrestlers and became affiliated with the nWo although he never officially joined. Flair's betrayal eventually led to Booker T's drafting by Flair to be the newest nWo member on the May 13 episode of Raw. The feud between Austin and Flair escalated on that episode when Austin gained revenge by costing Flair an Undisputed WWE Championship match against Hollywood Hulk Hogan. This led to a handicap match at Judgment Day pitting Austin against the team of Flair and Big Show, which Austin won.

After defeating "Stone Cold" Steve Austin at Backlash, The Undertaker set his sights on the new Undisputed WWF Champion Hollywood Hulk Hogan by challenging him to a match for the Undisputed WWF Championship at Judgment Day. In 1991, they first fought for the WWF Championship during two different pay-per-view events. At the Survivor Series event, The Undertaker defeated Hogan to win his first WWF Championship. Hogan regained the title over The Undertaker in a rematch at This Tuesday in Texas. The title was eventually declared vacant until the 1992 Royal Rumble event when Ric Flair won the title by winning the Royal Rumble match that also involved The Undertaker and Hogan. Their feud restarted on the April 25 episode of SmackDown!, when Chris Jericho defeated Triple H to become the number one contender due to The Undertaker's interference. Afterwards, Jericho and The Undertaker attacked Triple H until Hogan came down to the ring and assaulted The Undertaker. On the April 29 episode of Raw, The Undertaker interfered in Hogan's non-title match with William Regal by assaulting Hogan. The Undertaker then took Hogan's leather belt and whipped him with it and busted him open with the belt buckle. The following week, Hogan got back at The Undertaker by driving a semi-truck and running over The Undertaker's prized motorcycle, thus destroying it. On the May 13 episode of Raw, The Undertaker nailed Hogan from behind with the tire-iron then tied Hogan's ankles to his own motorcycle. Moments later, The Undertaker drove his motorcycle around the hallway with Hogan tied to it before ramming Hogan into the pile of boxes and pipes, leaving Hogan lying motionless. At Judgment Day, with the help of Mr. McMahon, The Undertaker defeated Hogan to win the now renamed WWE Undisputed Championship, his first WWE world championship win in nearly three years.

The feud between Edge and Kurt Angle continued after Backlash on the May 2 episode of SmackDown!, when Angle challenged Edge to a rematch but this time in a Hair vs. Hair match, which Edge accepted. On the May 16 episode of SmackDown!, during a segment between Edge and Triple H, Angle and Chris Jericho attacked both men, ending with Jericho manhandling Edge while Angle cut his hair once with the scissors as an example for their Hair vs. Hair match at Judgment Day. Later that episode, Angle and Jericho defeated Edge and Triple H in a tag team match after Angle nailed Edge with the steel chair and followed it with an Angle Slam for the win. After the match, Angle tossed Edge's hairpiece onto Edge. In the Hair vs. Hair match at Judgment Day, Edge defeated Angle and shaved Angle's head bald following it.

Triple H and Chris Jericho continued their feud on the April 25 episode of SmackDown!, where Jericho defeated Triple H in a number one contenders match due to interference by The Undertaker, who also cost Triple H the Undisputed WWF Championship at Backlash. The following week, Jericho challenged Hollywood Hulk Hogan for the Undisputed WWF Championship in a no disqualification match with a stipulation added that if The Undertaker or any Raw superstar interfered in the title match, they would be suspended. During the title match, Triple H interfered and distracted Jericho, enabling Hogan to pin Jericho to retain the title. On the May 9 episode of SmackDown!, Mr. McMahon ordered that if Triple H had laid his hands on McMahon, there would be consequences. Triple H then challenged McMahon to fight him in the ring until Hardcore Holly, Test, Lance Storm, Christian, and Reverend D-Von came to the ring and beat Triple H down. Jericho then came down and nailed Triple H with the steel chair then locked him in the Walls of Jericho, ending with McMahon announcing a Hell in a Cell match at Judgment Day, which would be a WrestleMania X8 rematch between the two. Later that night, Jericho and Triple H interfered in each other's matches. First, D-Von defeated Triple H after Jericho nailed Triple H with D-Von's donation box. Then during Jericho's tag team match along with Angle against Edge and Hogan, Triple H interfered and nailed all four of them and the referee with a sledgehammer. McMahon had decided to distract Triple H and dared Triple H to nail him with a sledgehammer, enabling Jericho to nail Triple H with the steel chair. They concluded their feud at Judgment Day, when Triple H defeated Jericho in a Hell in a Cell match.

Brock Lesnar continued his feud with Matt and Jeff Hardy on the April 22 episode of Raw when Lesnar defeated Matt Hardy by knockout. On the May 13 episode of Raw, The Hardy Boyz fought Lesnar in a handicap match and won by disqualification due to interference by Lesnar's manager Paul Heyman. Heyman then announced a tag team match pitting Lesnar and Heyman against The Hardy Boyz at Judgment Day. At Judgment Day, Lesnar and Heyman were victorious after Heyman pinned Jeff Hardy following an F-5 by Lesnar.

=== Home video release ===
The event was released on VHS and DVD on June 25, 2002, following the company's name change the month prior (nWo: Back in Black was the first WWE Home Video release with the new name, although some copies were shipped with WWF branding). As a result, the cover art, based on the event's poster, was changed to include the renamed and redesigned logo of the promotion, although references to WWF were not blurred or edited out. The version included on WWE Network, however, replaces the original theme music (Young Grow Old by Creed) with Quench's 'Waiting For A Moment'.

== Results ==
No.	Results	Stipulations	Times
1^{H}	Big Show defeated Steven Richards and Justin Credible	Handicap match	2:11
2	Tajiri (with Torrie Wilson) defeated Billy Kidman (c)	Singles match for the WWF Cruiserweight Championship	9:08
3	Scott Hall (with X-Pac) defeated Bradshaw (with Faarooq)	Singles match	5:43
4	Jazz (c) defeated Trish Stratus by submission	Singles match for the WWF Women's Championship	4:29
5	Brock Lesnar (with Paul Heyman) defeated Jeff Hardy (with Lita) by Technical Knockout	Singles match	5:32
6	Kurt Angle defeated Edge	Singles match	13:25
7	Eddie Guerrero defeated Rob Van Dam (c)	Singles match for the WWF Intercontinental Championship	11:43
8	The Undertaker defeated "Stone Cold" Steve Austin	Singles match to determine the #1 contender for the Undisputed WWF Championship with Ric Flair as special guest referee	27:03
9	Billy and Chuck (c) (with Rico) defeated Al Snow and Maven	Tag team match for the WWF Tag Team Championship	5:58
10	Hollywood Hulk Hogan defeated Triple H (c)	Singles match for the Undisputed WWF Championship	22:04
(c) / – the champion(s) heading into the match; H / – the match was broadcast prior to the pay-per-view on Sunday Night Heat

=== Undisputed WWF Championship #1 Contender's Tournament (April 2002) ===
The Undisputed WWF Championship #1 Contendership Tournament was a tournament to earn a title shot for the Undisputed WWF Championship at Judgment Day, with the finals taking place at Backlash.

Semifinals
1	"Stone Cold" Steve Austin	Pin
4	Scott Hall	9:35
3	Rob Van Dam	Pin
2	The Undertaker	9:00

Final
"Stone Cold" Steve Austin	27:03
The Undertaker	Pin
