= WrestleMania X8 =

2002 World Wrestling Federation pay-per-view event

- Promotional poster featuring Hollywood Hulk Hogan and The Rock
- Promotion: World Wrestling Federation
- Date: March 17, 2002
- City: Toronto, Ontario, Canada
- Venue: SkyDome
- Attendance: 68,237
- Buy rate: 860,000
- Tagline(s): Icon vs. Icon; The Absolute Best Ever; The One and Only

Pay-per-view chronology
← Previous; No Way Out	Next → Backlash

WrestleMania chronology
← Previous; X-Seven	Next → XIX

WWE in Canada chronology
← Previous; Rock Bottom: In Your House	Next → No Way Out

WrestleMania X8, also known as WrestleMania 18, was a 2002 professional wrestling pay-per-view (PPV) event produced by the American promotion World Wrestling Federation (WWF, now WWE). It was the 18th annual WrestleMania and took place on March 17, 2002, at the SkyDome in Toronto, Ontario, Canada. It was the second WrestleMania at that venue after WrestleMania VI in 1990.

The event marked the last WrestleMania under the WWF name before the company was renamed to World Wrestling Entertainment (WWE) in May, and the last one held before the introduction of the brand extension just a week after the event. This is the last WrestleMania to be held outside the United States until 2027 when it is to be hosted in Saudi Arabia. The SkyDome, renamed to Rogers Centre in 2005, would not host another WWE event until 2025 when Elimination Chamber took place.

Twelve matches were contested at the event including one match that was broadcast on the Sunday Night Heat pre-show on MTV. The Rock defeated Hollywood Hulk Hogan in the main attraction dubbed "Icon vs. Icon", in what was Hogan's first WrestleMania since WrestleMania IX in 1993. In the final match, Triple H defeated Chris Jericho to win the Undisputed WWF Championship. In other prominent matches on the undercard, "Stone Cold" Steve Austin defeated Scott Hall, The Undertaker defeated Ric Flair in a no disqualification match, and Rob Van Dam defeated William Regal to win the WWF Intercontinental Championship.

The record-breaking attendance for the SkyDome of 68,237 grossed approximately $6.1 million CAD ($3.9 million USD). WrestleMania weekend also included WWF Fan Axxess at the Canadian National Exhibition's Automotive Building.

== Production ==
=== Background ===
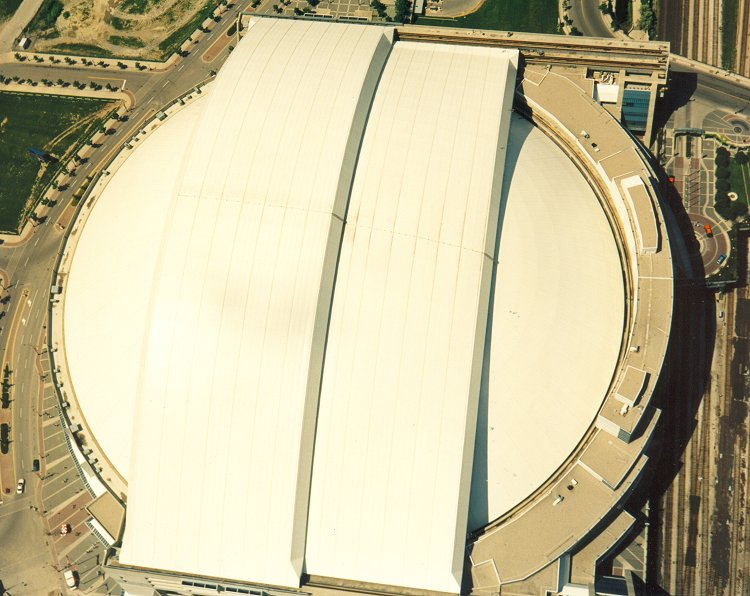
The event was held in SkyDome in Toronto, Ontario, Canada, which was the second WrestleMania to be held at the venue after WrestleMania VI in 1990.

WrestleMania is considered the World Wrestling Federation's (WWF, now WWE) flagship professional wrestling pay-per-view (PPV) event, having first been held in 1985. It has become the longest-running professional wrestling event in history and is held annually between mid-March to mid-April. It was the first of the WWF's original four pay-per-views, which includes Royal Rumble, SummerSlam, and Survivor Series, referred to as the "Big Four", and was considered one of the "Big Five" PPVs with the addition of King of the Ring in 1993. WrestleMania 18, stylized as WrestleMania X8, was scheduled to be held on St Patrick’s Day on March 17, 2002, at the SkyDome in Toronto, Ontario, Canada, marking the second WrestleMania at that venue after WrestleMania VI in April 1990.

=== Storylines ===
The event included eleven matches that each resulted from scripted storylines. Results were predetermined by writers of the World Wrestling Federation, while storylines were produced on WWF's weekly television shows, Raw and SmackDown! along with its supplementary programs, Sunday Night Heat and Jakked/Metal.

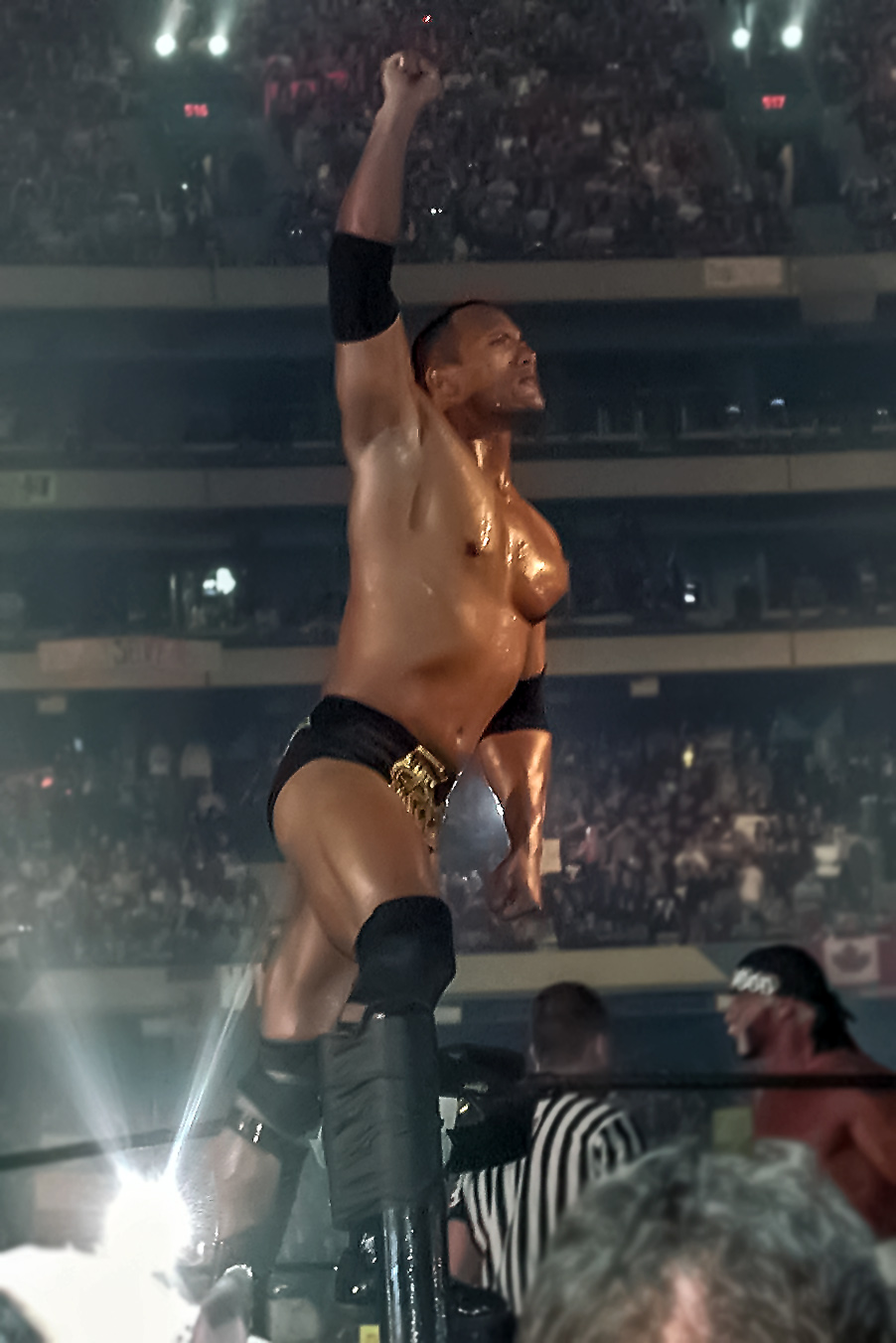
The Rock (left) poses to the crowd before his match against Hollywood Hogan (far right)

The main feud built up in the lead to the event pitted The Rock and "Stone Cold" Steve Austin against the New World Order (Hollywood Hogan, Kevin Nash and Scott Hall) with the main attraction being promoted as The Rock vs. Hollywood Hulk Hogan, billed as an Icon vs. Icon, face of the company generational match.

The Rock's involvement with the nWo started after his win over The Undertaker at No Way Out, when a photo request from Hogan for his son turned into a trade of insults. On the following episode of Raw, The Rock interrupted Hogan's address to the crowd and challenged Hogan to a match at WrestleMania. When Hogan accepted and shook hands with his future opponent, The Rock kept the hold on and hit the Rock Bottom on Hogan. Before The Rock could leave the arena, however, Hall and Nash ambushed The Rock. Hogan, Nash, and Hall then attacked The Rock with a belt, a hammer, and all three of their finishers, concluding the assault by spray painting the nWo initials on The Rock's back. With medics attending to The Rock and loading him into an ambulance van, the nWo furthered the attack by forcing the medics to retreat, chaining up all possible exits of the van, and driving a semi-truck into the van with The Rock trapped inside. "Stone Cold" Steve Austin's involvement also commenced at No Way Out, when after having their gift of beer refused, the nWo interfered with Austin's WWF Undisputed Championship match against Chris Jericho, helping Jericho to retain the title before spray painting the nWo initials on Austin's back. Austin finally got his revenge on the February 21 episode of SmackDown! when, after the nWo had given a half hearted apology for their attack on The Rock, Austin chased the nWo out of the ring with a tire iron. Austin managed to catch Hall and attack him with the tire iron, but Hogan and Nash saved Hall from being run over by Austin's pickup truck. After the nWo found their limousine spray-painted "What?" by Austin, the latter kidnapped Hall and closed the show by embarrassing him in the middle of the ring with "3:16" spray-painted on his back. On the following episode of Raw, Hall challenged Austin to a match at WrestleMania, which Austin accepted afterward. The feud between Austin and the nWo continued back and forth for the next couple of weeks with Austin attacked by Hall twice with a cinder block and a wrench, while Austin fired a netgun at Nash before beating down Hall. On the March 7 episode of SmackDown!, The Rock made his return and immediately challenged Hogan for a fight. Nash and Hall held Hogan back, leaving Hall to challenge for a match instead. The Rock's match with Hall ended in a three-on-one attack by the nWo. The nWo's attack was stopped by Austin, however, who saved The Rock with the aid of a steel chair. On the March 11 episode of Raw, Rock and Austin took on the nWo in a handicap match, resulting in Hogan pinning The Rock after a leg drop.

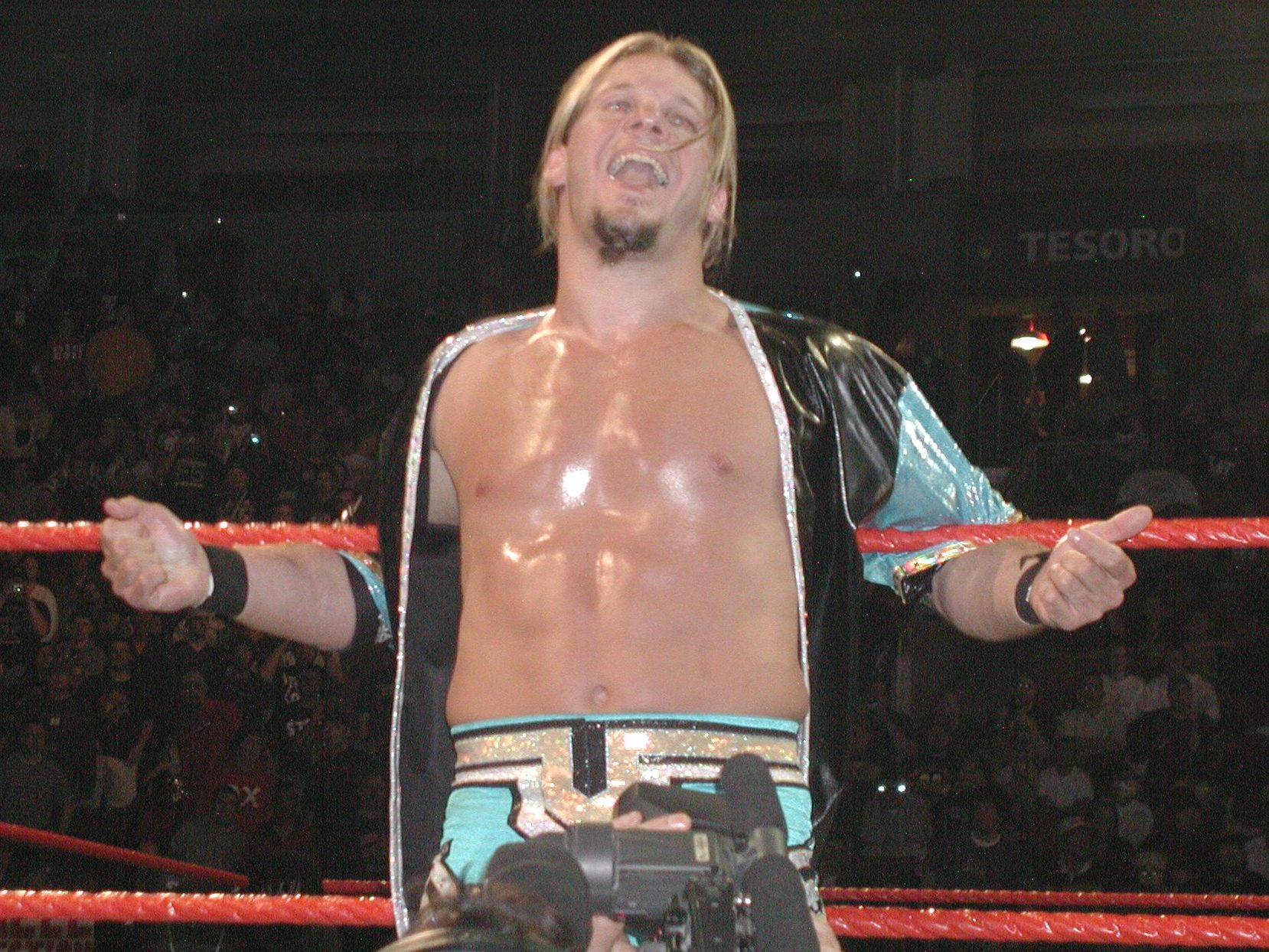
Chris Jericho, the Undisputed WWF Champion

The secondary feud leading into WrestleMania X8 involved Triple H against the Undisputed WWF Champion Chris Jericho and Stephanie McMahon. At the Royal Rumble, Jericho defeated The Rock to retain the Undisputed WWF Championship. On the same night, Triple H earned his opportunity to compete for the Undisputed WWF Championship at WrestleMania by winning the Royal Rumble match, last eliminating Kurt Angle. The following night on Raw, Triple H interrupted Jericho and warned Jericho that he would win the Undisputed WWF Championship. Meanwhile, some hostility between Triple H and his wife Stephanie was starting to show, with the face Triple H growing tired of Stephanie's heel characteristics. In order to repair their relationship, Stephanie suggested on Raw that the two should renew their wedding vows on the following week. At first Triple H refused, but Stephanie revealed that she was pregnant, making him change his mind. To further prove Stephanie's claim, the two met a doctor on the next episode of SmackDown! with ultrasound images. On the February 11 episode of Raw just minutes before the wedding ceremony, Triple H received a phone call from his mother-in-law Linda McMahon, who had sent him a video tape revealing that the doctor was, in fact, an actor and that Stephanie was not pregnant. At the wedding, Triple H turned on Stephanie and attacked her, along with her father Mr. McMahon, saying that their marriage was now over. In the meantime, Kurt Angle was given a match with Triple H at No Way Out, with Triple H's WrestleMania title shot on the line. In revenge for the ruined wedding, Mr. McMahon appointed Stephanie as the special guest referee for the match. At No Way Out, with clear bias from Stephanie, Angle defeated Triple H for the title shot. The following night on Raw, WWF co-owner Ric Flair granted Triple H a rematch with Stephanie barred from ringside, enabling him to successfully regain his title shot at Chris Jericho. On the February 21 episode of SmackDown!, Jericho met with Stephanie and the two decided put their differences in the past, ending with Stephanie accepting Jericho's proposal to be his new business partner. To further the feud, Jericho later speculated that he ended the marriage by causing Triple H's quadriceps muscle to (legit) tear during their WWF Tag Team Championship match on the May 21, 2001 episode of Raw Is War, thus diverting Triple H's attention to his wife. Under the divorce settlement for the two, the assets would be split between them "50/50" to Stephanie's disgust. Among the assets were Triple H's first wrestling robe, Stephanie's Corvette (which Triple H later gave to her with half of it cut off) and Triple H's bulldog Lucy. Stephanie managed to win Lucy in the settlement, and on the March 11 episode of Raw, sent Jericho to walk the dog. Displeased about this, Jericho tied Lucy to a limousine and ordered the unknowing driver to buy some air fresheners, which resulted in the driver running Lucy over into a critical condition by accident. Wanting retribution, Triple H stormed into the arena and tried to attack Stephanie, but he was met with two sledgehammer shots to his recovered leg by Jericho. On the following episode of SmackDown!, Stephanie noted that the sledgehammer shots had left Triple H's quad in such a critical condition, that one false move in his WrestleMania match could reinjure his quadriceps once again. At the end of the show, Triple H and Jericho had a brawl in the ring that almost ended with a Pedigree on Stephanie. However, Jericho saved her and locked the Walls of Jericho on Triple H, leaving the show with the advantage.

Another major feud for WrestleMania X8 was the rivalry between The Undertaker and the WWF co-owner, Ric Flair. The feud started over The Undertaker's ambush on The Rock during the buildup to No Way Out, with The Undertaker giving The Rock a chokeslam and a Tombstone Piledriver onto the roof of a limousine. Shortly afterward, Ric Flair openly spoke out against The Undertaker's actions. At the No Way Out event, Flair interfered with The Undertaker's match against The Rock, finally hitting The Undertaker with a lead pipe to aid The Rock in victory. Enraged over this result, The Undertaker challenged Flair to a match at WrestleMania. Flair initially refused, stating that he was now an owner and no longer an active wrestler. However, The Undertaker tried to convince Flair by attacking select members of Flair's friends and family. Following a match on the February 25 episode of Raw, Flair's close friend Arn Anderson was ambushed by The Undertaker while performing his road agent duties. The Undertaker continued to goad Flair the following week by attacking Flair's son David, threatening that the rest of Flair's children would soon follow. Upon this attack, Flair finally accepted the match on the March 7 episode of SmackDown!. Later that night, the two ended up brawling into the audience, resulting in Flair punching out a fan by accident. As a result, Flair was arrested much to The Undertaker's delight. On the March 11 episode of Raw, Flair's rival co-owner Mr. McMahon asked for an emergency board meeting with the WWF board of directors, citing that Flair's attack of a fan was unacceptable and that either he or Flair should have absolute authority and power over the company. With Flair still keen on taking on Undertaker at WrestleMania, CEO Linda McMahon had no choice but to give Vince total control over the company. Despite this, Linda also stated that the ownership situation would also be reviewed after WrestleMania with a final decision. To add further insult, Mr. McMahon booked David Flair in a match against The Undertaker on the March 14 episode of SmackDown!. The Undertaker almost gave David a Last Ride, but was stopped by Ric Flair, who saved his son with some steel chair shots.

== Event ==
Other on-screen personnel
Role:	Name:
Commentators	Jim Ross
Commentators	Jerry Lawler
Commentators	Carlos Cabrera (Spanish)
Commentators	Hugo Savinovich (Spanish)
Interviewers	Jonathan Coachman
Interviewers	Michael Cole
Interviewers	Lilian Garcia
Ring announcer	Howard Finkel
Referees	Mike Chioda
Referees	Jack Doan
Referees	Brian Hebner
Referees	Earl Hebner
Referees	Jacqueline
Referees	Jim Korderas
Referees	Teddy Long
Referees	Nick Patrick
Referees	Chad Patton
Referees	Charles Robinson
Referees	Mike Sparks
Referees	Tim White

Before the pay-per-view event aired began, Mr. Perfect, Lance Storm and Test faced Rikishi, Scotty 2 Hotty and Albert in six-man tag team match on Sunday Night Heat. Rikishi won the match for his team after pinning Mr. Perfect following a Banzai Drop.

The actual pay-per-view started with a live performance of "Superstar" by rock band Saliva (Josey Scott, Wayne Swinny, Chris D'Abaldo, Dave Novotny and Paul Crosby). The first match of the night saw William Regal defend his WWF Intercontinental Championship against Rob Van Dam. Twice in the match, Regal tried to use brass knuckles to set up the Power of the Punch on Van Dam. But on both occasions, Van Dam kicked them away. Van Dam won the match after a Five-Star Frog Splash to win his first Intercontinental Championship.

The WWF European Championship match between the champion Diamond Dallas Page and Christian followed. Christian executed a neckbreaker on Page and Page performed a roll-up on Christian, but neither man scored a pinfall. Page won the match after executing a Diamond Cutter on Christian.

The WWF Hardcore Champion Maven defended his title against Goldust next in a Hardcore match. The match ended when both Goldust and Maven knocked each other out with trashcan lids. Spike Dudley then came out and pinned Maven for a three count. Under the title's 24/7 rules, Spike became the new champion. His celebration was short-lived, as Crash Holly chased Spike through the crowd with Maven and Goldust following suit. In a promotion for the show's main event, rock band Drowning Pool (Dave Williams, C. J. Pierce, Stevie Benton and Mike Luce) made a live performance of "Tear Away" with a video package playing in the background. After the performance, the show cut to backstage, where Crash Holly and Spike Dudley continued to fight. Al Snow tried to interfere by driving a golf cart (along with referee Theodore Long) towards the two, but ended up crashing into some boxes. Spike successfully fought off Holly by throwing him into a steel door, but ended up getting kicked by The Hurricane who swung off a rope. The Hurricane then pinned Spike to become the new Hardcore Champion.

Next, Kurt Angle fought Kane. During the match, Angle executed Kane's signature flying clothesline. Confidently, Angle tried another, but Kane countered with a clothesline of his own. Later on, Kane attempted a Tombstone Piledriver, but Angle grabbed Kane's mask, distracting him long enough for Angle to execute an Angle Slam. Angle then applied the ankle lock on Kane, which was stopped when Kane reached the ropes. With Angle still holding the foot, Kane used the other foot to perform an enzuigiri. A top rope attack by Kane was prevented when Angle rushed to the corner and executed a belly to belly suplex on him. Kane tried a chokeslam, but Angle reversed it into a roll-up using the ropes to win the match.

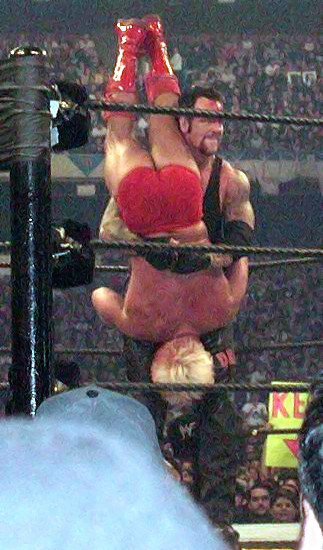
The Undertaker performs the Tombstone Piledriver on Ric Flair.

After that, Ric Flair took on The Undertaker in a no disqualification match. The match started with a brawl outside the ring with Flair's back getting smashed into the ring post. The Undertaker tried Old School, but Flair pulled him down. Later, Flair locked The Undertaker in a figure-four leglock, which The Undertaker countered by executing a chokeslam. Arn Anderson then interfered and executed a spinebuster on The Undertaker, allowing Flair to pin The Undertaker for a near-fall. The Undertaker then locked Anderson in a Dragon sleeper, but Flair hit The Undertaker with a chair. The Undertaker retaliated with a big boot and failed to perform a Last Ride attempt due to exhaustion, but The Undertaker executed the Tombstone Piledriver on Flair and pinned him for the win. The Undertaker then acknowledged his WrestleMania winning streak for the first time by holding up his hands with his fingers outstretched to show his ten straight wins.

In the sixth match, Edge faced Booker T. Booker T gained the advantage early on in the match. However, Edge recovered by countering Booker T's top rope attack with a hurricanrana and followed this up with a spinning heel kick off the top rope. Booker T executed a Scissors Kick for a near-fall, while Edge delivered a spear for a near-fall. After performing his own version of Booker T's Spinaroonie, Edge won the match with an Edgecution.

Backstage, The Hurricane was interviewed by Jonathan Coachman about winning the Hardcore Championship. The Hurricane's sidekick, Mighty Molly, appeared and suggested the two should go to their Hurri-Cycle. Just as The Hurricane headed in that direction, Molly smashed a frying pan over the back of his head and pinned him to become the new Hardcore Champion.

Next, "Stone Cold" Steve Austin wrestled Scott Hall. With Kevin Nash in Hall's corner, Austin was left having to fend off both wrestlers. The nWo's teamwork enabled Hall to give Austin an Irish whip into an exposed turnbuckle. Austin executed a Stunner on Hall, but Nash pulled the referee out of the ring to break the count and attacked Austin. Austin then delivered a pair of Stunners to both Nash and Hall, but another pin attempt on Hall was prevented when Nash elbow dropped the second referee. Hall's Razor's Edge attempt was reversed by Austin into a back drop outside of the ring. Eventually, Nash was forced to leave the stadium by WWF officials. Hall then executed a Stunner on Austin for a near-fall, but Austin retaliated with two Stunners for the win.

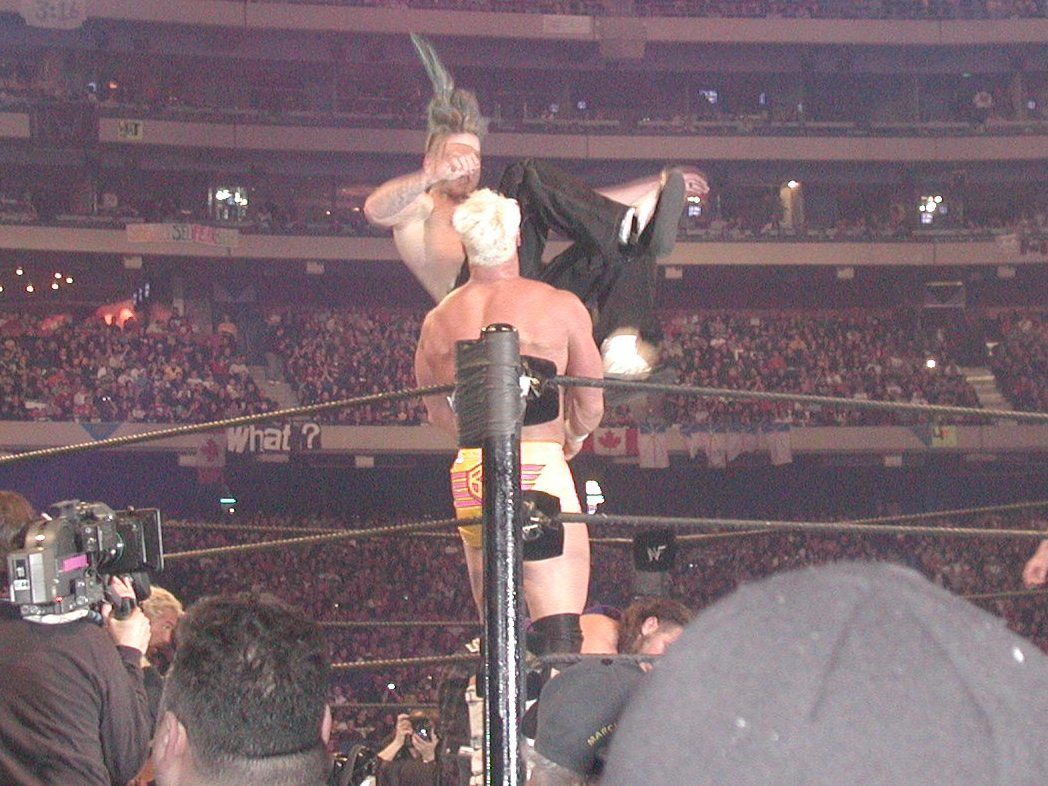
The Hardy Boyz (Jeff Hardy, top and Matt Hardy, bottom) perform the Poetry in Motion on Billy in their Tag Team Championship match

After that, a four corners elimination match pitted for the WWF Tag Team Champions, Billy and Chuck, against the APA, The Dudley Boyz, and The Hardy Boyz. For the Dudleys' entrance, Saliva performed their theme, "Turn the Tables", live. The APA were quickly eliminated first when D-Von Dudley pinned Bradshaw following a 3D from both Dudleys. The Dudleys then set up a table outside. Stacy Keibler, valet for the Dudley Boyz, tried to distract Jeff Hardy, by showing him her thong, but Hardy spanked and kissed her before shoving her off the ring apron. The Dudleys tried to go for a Whassup headbutt, but Billy pushed D-Von off the top rope, sending him crashing through the table outside. Bubba Ray Dudley was then given a Twist of Fate by Matt Hardy followed by a Swanton Bomb from Jeff. Matt then covered Bubba Ray to eliminate The Dudley Boyz. Billy and Chuck retained their titles when Billy hit Jeff with one of the tag team title belts, enabling Chuck to pin him.

Backstage, the battle for the Hardcore Championship continued when Mighty Molly ran straight into the top half of a dutch door, which was shut by Christian. Christian then pinned Molly to win the title.

In the main attraction, The Rock faced Hollywood Hogan in a match dubbed as "Icon vs. Icon". Despite The Rock portraying a face and Hogan a heel, the Canadian crowd overwhelmingly cheered Hulk Hogan over The Rock instead. During the match, The Rock applied the Sharpshooter, but the referee was down and unable to acknowledge a submission. The Rock released the hold and tried to revive the referee, but Hogan hit a low blow and a Rock Bottom for a near-fall. The two tried their respective finishers, the Rock Bottom and the leg drop, but each kicked out. After two more Rock Bottoms and a People's Elbow, The Rock pinned Hogan and won the match. After the match, the two shook hands with respect. As The Rock left the ring, Kevin Nash and Scott Hall came to the ring and verbally berated Hogan for showing respect to The Rock. Hall and Nash then attacked Hogan, ending Hogan's involvement in the nWo. The Rock returned and saved Hogan from further attack. As a sign of respect, The Rock stopped Hogan from leaving the ring and asked him to pose for the crowd, turning Hogan into a face for the first time since 2000. Hogan later gave an interview in 2013, which indicated that he and The Rock changed the thrust of the match on the fly based on the crowd's response.

In the penultimate match, Jazz defended the WWF Women's Championship in a triple threat match against Trish Stratus and Lita. Near the end of the match, Trish attempted a Stratusfaction, but Lita threw her out of the ring. With Lita sitting on the top turnbuckle, Jazz followed and delivered a fisherman superplex, allowing her to pin Lita and retain the title.

At the parking lot, Christian was getting ready to leave the stadium in a taxi. However, Maven pulled Christian out and quickly pinned him to win back the Hardcore Championship. Maven then hopped into the taxi and left, leaving him as the final Hardcore Champion of the night.

An attendance record setting 68,237 fans at the SkyDome for WrestleMania X8

In the final match of the evening, Chris Jericho defended the Undisputed WWF Championship against Triple H. For his entrance, Triple H had Drowning Pool perform their version of his theme song, "The Game", live. With Triple H's leg bandaged, both Jericho and Stephanie McMahon gave numerous shots at the leg during the match. Triple H outsmarted the two by dodging Jericho's attack, causing him to collide with Stephanie, who was standing on the apron. Outside the ring, Triple H went for the Pedigree on Jericho through an announce table, but Jericho countered into a back body drop through the Spanish announce table. Stephanie then tried to hit Triple H with a chair, when referee Earl Hebner interceded. Stephanie pushed Hebner aside, but was met by a Pedigree from Triple H. Jericho then struck Triple H in the head with the chair while Hebner was attending to Stephanie for an unsuccessful pinfall attempt. Jericho then tried a Pedigree on Triple H, but Triple H reversed it into a catapult into the turnbuckle. Triple H executed the Pedigree on Jericho and pinned him to win the title.

== Reception ==
WrestleMania X8 was met with a generally positive critical reception. Writing for SLAM! Wrestling, John Powell gave the overall event 7 out of 10 stars, which was a lower rating than the previous year's event. The main event between Chris Jericho and Triple H for the Undisputed WWF Championship received the highest rating out of all the matches on the card of 8 out of 10 stars, the match between The Rock and Hollywood Hogan received a rating of 7 out of 10 stars, the match between "Stone Cold" Steve Austin and Scott Hall received a rating of 6 out of 10 stars, the no disqualification match between The Undertaker and Ric Flair was rated 7.5 out of 10 stars and the four corners elimination match for the WWF Tag Team Championship between Billy and Chuck, The APA, The Hardy Boyz, and The Dudley Boyz being rated 5 out of 10 stars.

According to Chris Jericho, he tried to not be the last match of the card despite being the Undisputed WWF Champion. According to him, the true main event was Rock vs. Hogan and Triple H and he could not follow that match. The Rock vs. Hulk Hogan match would go on to be well praised over the years as one of the most iconic wrestling matches ever, as well as being named Pro Wrestling Illustrated's match of the year 2002. Mike Chioda expressed his thoughts on the match, stating, "Did I know it was gonna be so legendary back then? Hell no, I didn’t know. I didn’t know a few years later. We thought something was gonna at some point top that, and I don’t think at some point since 2002, since Rock and Hogan, has really topped that." John Cena, Cody Rhodes, The Miz and Rusev consider it the greatest match ever.

== Aftermath ==
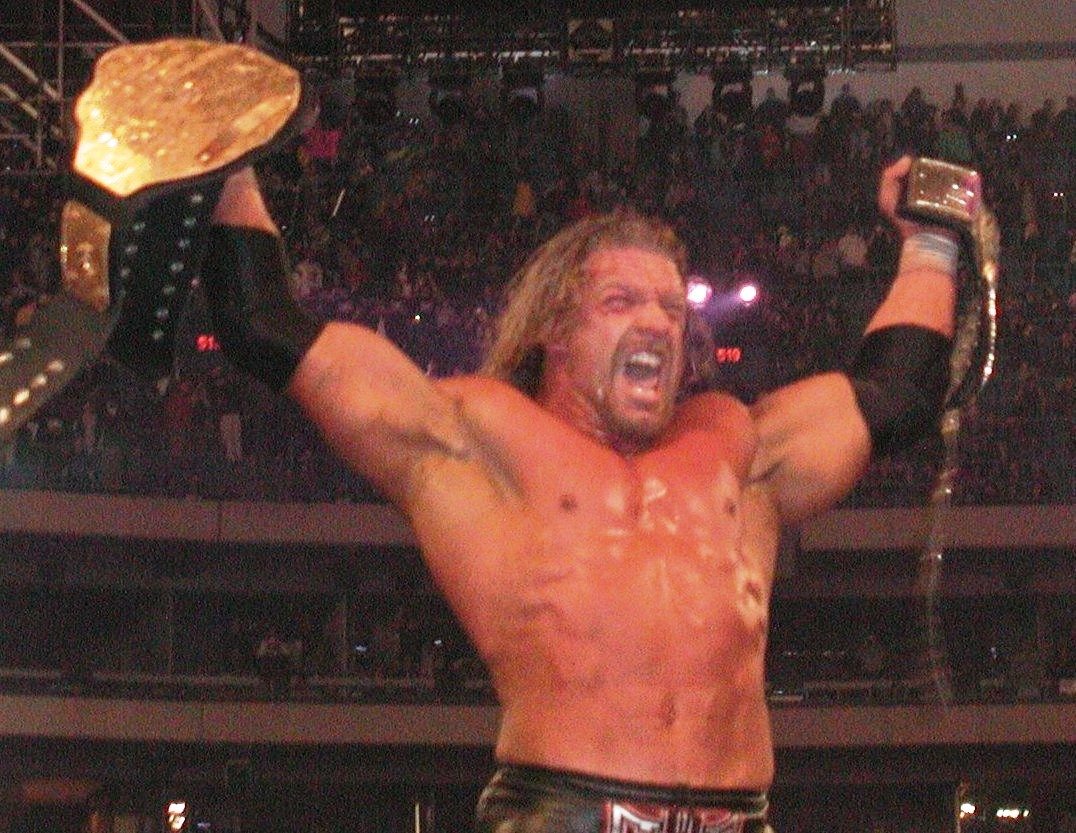
Triple H won the Undisputed WWF Championship in the main event

After WrestleMania, the WWF board of directors made their final decision over the control of the company. Due to the personal conflicts between Mr. McMahon and Ric Flair resulting in bad business for the company, Linda McMahon proposed a brand extension, essentially splitting the entire WWF roster into two separate entities, named after their two major television shows, Raw and SmackDown!. Vince took control of the SmackDown! brand, while Flair controlled the Raw brand. A draft was held where each owner would get a total of thirty picks between the wrestlers. The draft was held on the March 25 episode of Raw, while the brand extension officially began on April 1.

Triple H's feud with Stephanie McMahon would conclude on the March 25 episode of Raw, when he defeated her and Chris Jericho in a triple threat match for the Undisputed WWF Championship. By pinning her, Stephanie was forced to leave the WWF in accordance with the match stipulations. Triple H's feud with Jericho would continue, with both Jericho and The Undertaker interfering with Triple H's championship match at Backlash against Hollywood Hulk Hogan and costing him the Undisputed WWF Championship. Triple H would finish his feud with Jericho in a Hell in a Cell match at Judgment Day, and later challenged The Undertaker for the WWE Undisputed Championship at King of the Ring, but lost after interference from the returning Rock.

After the reaction during his return match, Hollywood Hulk Hogan was quickly turned face. Until the brand extension separated both parties, The Rock and Hogan feuded with Kevin Nash and Scott Hall, with Nash and Hall having had expelled Hogan from the nWo. On the final SmackDown! before the brand extension, the team of The Rock, Hogan and Kane defeated Nash, Hall and returning nWo member X-Pac in a six-man tag match. The Rock left shortly after the WWF draft for three months to go on a media tour to promote his movie, The Scorpion King.

"Stone Cold" Steve Austin no-showed the following two weeks after WrestleMania, claiming to be burned out. When he returned on the April 1 episode of Raw, the show was centered on which brand he would choose. Both McMahon and Flair would attempt to win his signature, with Austin eventually choosing the Raw brand. After being drafted to Raw, Austin would get himself involved in the feud between The Undertaker and Ric Flair, fighting The Undertaker at Backlash for a shot at the WWF Undisputed Championship, which he would lose. The storyline itself evolved into a feud between Austin and Flair, with the nWo's involvement on Flair's behalf.

Maven would have another defense of the Hardcore Championship on Raw the following night, against Al Snow. The match would end in a no-contest when both men, as well as Spike Dudley, were wiped out by the debuting Brock Lesnar.

WrestleMania X8 was the last WrestleMania held before the introduction of the brand extension on March 25, which split the roster between the Raw and SmackDown! brands, where wrestlers were exclusively assigned to perform. It was also the last WrestleMania held under the WWF name, as the company was renamed to World Wrestling Entertainment (WWE) in May. This is also the last WrestleMania to be held outside the United States until 2027 when WrestleMania 43 will emante from Riyadh, Saudi Arabia. The WWE would then return to this venue, which was then renamed to the Rogers Centre in 2025, for Elimination Chamber: Toronto.

== Results ==
No.	Results	Stipulations	Times
1^{H}	Rikishi, Scotty 2 Hotty and Albert defeated Mr. Perfect, Lance Storm and Test	Six-man tag team match with Jacqueline as special guest referee	3:06
2	Rob Van Dam defeated William Regal (c)	Singles match for the WWF Intercontinental Championship	6:22
3	Diamond Dallas Page (c) defeated Christian	Singles match for the WWF European Championship	6:10
4	Maven (c) vs. Goldust ended when Spike Dudley pinned Maven	Hardcore match for the WWF Hardcore Championship	3:17
5	Kurt Angle defeated Kane	Singles match	10:45
6	The Undertaker defeated Ric Flair	No Disqualification match	18:47
7	Edge defeated Booker T	Singles match	6:32
8	"Stone Cold" Steve Austin defeated Scott Hall (with Kevin Nash)	Singles match	9:51
9	Billy and Chuck (Billy Gunn and Chuck Palumbo) (c) defeated The APA (Faarooq and Bradshaw), The Dudley Boyz (Bubba Ray Dudley and D-Von Dudley) (with Stacy Keibler) and The Hardy Boyz (Matt Hardy and Jeff Hardy)	Four corners elimination match for the WWF Tag Team Championship	13:50
10	The Rock defeated Hollywood Hulk Hogan	Singles match	16:24
11	Jazz (c) defeated Trish Stratus and Lita	Triple threat match for the WWF Women's Championship	6:16
12	Triple H defeated Chris Jericho (c) (with Stephanie McMahon)	Singles match for the Undisputed WWF Championship	18:41
(c) / – the champion(s) heading into the match; H / – the match was broadcast prior to the pay-per-view on Sunday Night Heat

=== Four corners elimination match eliminations ===
Eliminated	Tag Team	Eliminated by	Time
1	The APA (Faarooq and Bradshaw)	D-Von Dudley	3:20
2	The Dudley Boyz (Bubba Ray Dudley and D-Von Dudley)	Matt Hardy	11:45
3	The Hardy Boyz (Matt Hardy and Jeff Hardy)	Chuck Palumbo	13:52
Winners	Billy and Chuck (Billy Gunn and Chuck Palumbo)		

== See also ==
- Professional wrestling in Canada
