= WWE Judgment Day (2002) =

World Wrestling Entertainment pay-per-view event

Judgment Day
- Promotional poster featuring The Undertaker. This poster featured the WWF name and logo instead of the WWE name and logo as it was created before the company's rebranding to WWE.
- Promotion: World Wrestling Entertainment
- Brand(s): Raw; SmackDown!
- Date: May 19, 2002
- City: Nashville, Tennessee
- Venue: Gaylord Entertainment Center
- Attendance: 14,521
- Buy rate: 370,000
- Tagline: Judge, Jury and Executioner

Pay-per-view chronology
← Previous; Insurrextion	Next → King of the Ring

Judgment Day chronology
← Previous; 2001	Next → 2003

The 2002 Judgment Day was a professional wrestling pay-per-view (PPV) event produced by World Wrestling Entertainment (WWE). It was the fourth Judgment Day and took place on May 19, 2002, at the Gaylord Entertainment Center in Nashville, Tennessee, held for wrestlers from the promotion's Raw and SmackDown! brand divisions. This was the first PPV event to be held under the "WWE" name, after the company abandoned their "WWF" trademark dispute with the World Wide Fund for Nature (WWF) on May 6, 2002. Some materials for the event were created before this name change and thus carried the "World Wrestling Federation" branding, such as promotional posters.

Nine matches were contested at the event. Two matches were promoted as main events; one match from each brand. In the main event from SmackDown!, The Undertaker defeated Hollywood Hulk Hogan to win the WWE Undisputed Championship. In the main event from Raw, "Stone Cold" Steve Austin defeated Ric Flair and Big Show in a handicap match. Other prominent matches included Triple H defeating Chris Jericho in a Hell in a Cell match, Edge defeating Kurt Angle in a hair vs. hair match, and in the opening bout, Eddie Guerrero defeated Rob Van Dam to retain Raw's Intercontinental Championship.

== Production ==
=== Background ===
Judgment Day was a professional wrestling pay-per-view (PPV) event first held by World Wrestling Entertainment (WWE) as the 25th In Your House PPV event in October 1998. Following the discontinuation of the In Your House series in February 1999, Judgment Day was reinstated in May 2000 as its own PPV event, establishing Judgment Day as the promotion's annual May PPV. The fourth event was held on May 19, 2002, at the Gaylord Entertainment Center in Nashville, Tennessee.

The 2002 Judgment Day was the promotion's first PPV held under the WWE name. The promotion was renamed from World Wrestling Federation (WWF) to WWE just two weeks before the event on May 6, 2002, as a result of the company abandoning their "WWF" trademark dispute with the World Wide Fund for Nature (WWF). Some materials for the event were created before this name change and thus carried the "WWF" branding, such as promotional posters. It was also the first Judgment Day held during the brand split that was introduced in March, a storyline subdivision in which the promotion divided its roster into two separate brands, Raw and SmackDown!, on which wrestlers were exclusively assigned to perform. The 2002 event in turn featured wrestlers from both brands.

=== Storylines ===
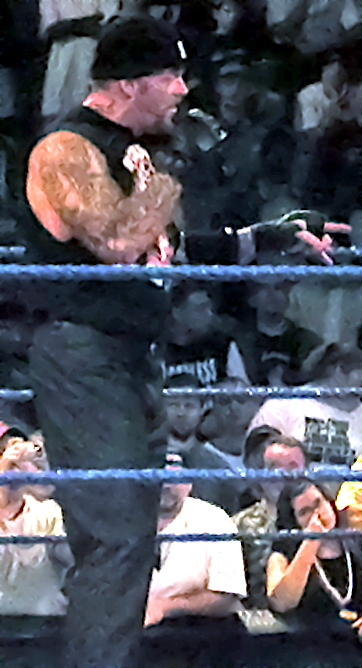
The Undertaker, who challenged Hollywood Hulk Hogan at Judgment Day for the WWE Undisputed Championship

The event consisted of nine professional wrestling matches that involved different wrestlers from pre-existing scripted feuds and storylines.

The main feud leading into Judgment Day on the Raw brand was between the WWE Undisputed Champion Hollywood Hulk Hogan and The Undertaker. At Backlash, The Undertaker defeated "Stone Cold" Steve Austin and became the number 1 contender to the championship, which Hogan won the same night by defeating Triple H (after The Undertaker interfered). On the April 25 episode of SmackDown!, The Undertaker attacked Triple H, prompting Hogan to run and save Triple H. On the April 29 episode of Raw, Hogan tried to attack The Undertaker. However, later that night, during Hogan's match with William Regal, The Undertaker attacked Hogan with Hogan's weight belt, busting him open. On the May 6 episode of Raw, Hogan stole The Undertaker's motorcycle and rode into the ring on it, and then tried to chase The Undertaker with the motorcycle (which did not start). Later that night, Hogan destroyed the motorcycle with a truck. On the May 13 episode of Raw, The Undertaker attacked Hogan backstage, tied him into Hogan's motorcycle and dragged him all over the backstage area. On the May 16 episode of SmackDown!, as Hogan was cutting a promo, Mr. McMahon confronted Hogan and Hogan attacked McMahon.

The main feud on SmackDown! featured Chris Jericho and Triple H. On the April 25 episode of SmackDown!, Jericho defeated Triple H with The Undertaker's help in order to get a title shot at Hollywood Hulk Hogan's Undisputed WWF Championship on the May 2 episode of SmackDown!. Jericho managed to convince Mr. McMahon to make the match a no disqualification match and to prevent Triple H from hitting Jericho. Jericho taunted Triple H later that night, but during the title match, The Undertaker's music hit. However, The Undertaker did not come to the ring and Hogan defeated Jericho to retain the championship. On the May 9 episode of SmackDown!, McMahon made Jericho and five other wrestlers (Christian, Hardcore Holly, Lance Storm, Reverend D-Von, and Test) beat on Triple H, while booking Jericho and Triple H in a Hell in a Cell match at Judgment Day. Jericho cost Triple H a match against Reverend D-Von, making Triple H attack Jericho as he teamed up with Kurt Angle against Edge and Hogan. After Triple H attacked all four competitors, McMahon then came to the ring and taunted Triple H, allowing Jericho to hit Triple H with the chair again. On the May 16 episode of SmackDown!, Jericho and Angle attacked Triple H and Edge, and defeated them in the main event.

Another main feud from the Raw brand was "Stone Cold" Steve Austin against Big Show and Ric Flair. At Backlash, Flair refereed the number one contender's match between Austin and The Undertaker, and counted Austin without seeing he had his foot on the bottom rope. On the April 22 episode of Raw, Flair told Austin that he made a mistake and booked Austin and Bradshaw against the nWo of Scott Hall and X-Pac, but Bradshaw was attacked backstage. Flair put Big Show in the match as a replacement, but Big Show turned on Austin and joined the nWo, blaming Austin for him being left off WrestleMania X8. On the April 29 episode of Raw, while Big Show was revealed as the man who attacked Bradshaw, Flair refereed a tag team match between Hall and X-Pac and the team of Austin and Bradshaw. Austin and Bradshaw won, even though X-Pac's foot was on the bottom rope. Flair then booked himself in a six-man tag team match on the May 6 episode of Raw, teaming with Bradshaw and Austin against the nWo. However, Flair turned on Austin and booked himself and Big Show against Austin in a handicap match at Judgment Day. On the May 13 episode of Raw, Austin cost Flair an Undisputed WWE Championship match against Hollywood Hulk Hogan, making Flair booking Bradshaw against Big Show and X-Pac (Hall was legitimately fired the week before) in a handicap match and booking Austin in a lumberjack match against a new nWo member. After the nWo defeated Bradshaw, Flair revealed Booker T as the new nWo member. Despite the entire lumberjacks being heels, Austin defeated Booker T, but he was attacked by the nWo and Flair after the match.

Another feud going from the SmackDown! brand was a hair vs hair match between Edge and Kurt Angle. Less than a year after Edge pinned Angle to be crowned King of the Ring, the former was positioned as a future headlining babyface. However, Angle was victorious when they met the prior month at Backlash. Edge was able to showcase the comedic side of his persona in segments leading into the rematch and was instrumental in popularizing "You suck!" chants towards Angle that would follow him in his career. According to Angle, McMahon intended for his head to be shaved as part of a more serious character shift.

== Event ==
Other on-screen personnel
Role:	Name:
English Commentators	Jim Ross
English Commentators	Jerry Lawler
Spanish Commentators	Carlos Cabrera
Spanish Commentators	Hugo Savinovich
Interviewer	Michael Cole
Ring announcer	Howard Finkel
Referees	Mike Chioda
Referees	Charles Robinson
Referees	Theodore Long
Referees	Earl Hebner
Referees	Tim White
Referees	Jim Korderas
Referees	Jack Doan

Before the event aired live on pay-per-view, a dark match took place in which William Regal defeated D'Lo Brown to retain the WWE European Championship.

=== Preliminary matches ===
The first match was for the WWE Intercontinental Championship between Eddie Guerrero and Rob Van Dam. Guerrero pinned Van Dam with a backslide using the ropes for leverage to retain the title.

The second match was for the WWE Women's Championship between Trish Stratus (with Bubba Ray Dudley) and Stacy Keibler (with Reverend D-Von and Batista). Despite interference from Batista, Stratus pinned Keibler after a Bulldog to win the match and retain the title. After the match, Reverend D-Von attacked Bubba Ray, with Reverend D-Von and Batista performing a double flapjack through a table on Bubba Ray.

The third match was between Brock Lesnar and Paul Heyman and The Hardy Boyz (Matt Hardy and Jeff Hardy). After Matt and Jeff gained control of the match, they attempted to attack Heyman, but Lesnar threw Jeff into Matt and performed an F-5 on Jeff. Heyman pinned Jeff to win the match.

The fourth match was a handicap match between Big Show and Ric Flair and "Stone Cold" Steve Austin. After Big Show and Flair dominated Austin, Flair applied a figure-four leglock on Austin, but Austin countered the hold. X-Pac interfered, attempting to perform a superkick on Austin, but Austin avoided the move, resulting in X-Pac performing a superkick on Big Show, and Austin performed a Stone Cold Stunner on X-Pac. Austin pinned Flair after a Stone Cold Stunner to win the match.

The fifth match was a hair vs. hair match between Kurt Angle and Edge. Edge attempted a spear on Angle, but Angle avoided the move, resulting in Edge performing a spear on the referee. Angle performed a German suplex on Edge and attempted to hit Edge with a chair, but Edge ducked and performed two spears on Angle for a near-fall. Angle performed an Angle Slam on Edge for a near-fall. Angle applied an ankle lock on Edge, but Edge countered the hold. Edge pinned Angle with a small package to win the match, after which Edge shaved Angle's hair.

=== Main event matches ===
The sixth match was a Hell in a Cell match between Triple H and Chris Jericho. Early in the match, both men threw each other into the cell wall. Triple H attempted a piledriver on Jericho, but Jericho countered the move and performed a catapult into the cell wall on Triple H. Jericho retrieved a ladder and hit Triple H with the ladder, causing Triple H to bleed. After Jericho controlled the match, Jericho attempted to use the ladder on Triple H, but Triple H hit the ladder with a chair, causing the ladder to hit Jericho. Jericho attempted to hit Triple H with the steel steps, but Triple H performed a drop toe hold on Jericho, knocking Jericho into the steel steps. Triple H pushed Jericho into referee Tim White, knocking him into the cell wall. Jericho hit Triple H with a chair and pinned Triple H, but White was still down. Jericho threw White into the cell wall, causing White to bleed. Triple H performed a spinebuster on Jericho as referees opened the cell door to check on the downed White. Triple H hit Jericho with a sledgehammer and pinned Jericho, but White was still down. Mike Chioda replaced White as the referee. Triple H and Jericho fought outside the cell, where Triple H performed a DDT through a broadcast table on Jericho. Triple H retrieved a 2X4 wrapped in barbed wire, but Jericho climbed the cell, leading to Triple H and the referee climbing the cell. Jericho hit Triple H with the 2X4 and applied the Walls of Jericho on Triple H atop the cell, but Triple H hit Jericho with the 2X4, forcing Jericho to release the hold. Jericho attempted to hit Triple H with the 2X4, but Triple H performed a low blow on him and attempted a Pedigree, which Jericho countered into a back body drop. Triple H hit Jericho with the 2X4 and pinned him after a Pedigree atop the cell to win the match.

The seventh match was for the WWE Tag Team Championship between Billy and Chuck and Rikishi and Rico. Despite Billy and Chuck dominating Rikishi, Rikishi pinned Chuck to win the match and the title.

The main event was for the WWE Undisputed Championship between Hollywood Hulk Hogan and The Undertaker. Before the match, The Undertaker and Hogan hit each other with a belt. When the bell rang, Hogan gained the early advantage and executed a superplex for a near-fall. After a back-and-forth match, The Undertaker performed a chokeslam on Hogan for a near-fall. Hogan retaliated but "hulking-up" and performed a running leg drop on The Undertaker for another near-fall. Mr. McMahon interfered, distracting the referee whilst The Undertaker retrieved a chair. Hogan attacked McMahon, performing a running leg drop on McMahon. Whilst the referee was distracted, The Undertaker hit Hogan with a chair and pinned Hogan after another chokeslam to win the title.

== Aftermath ==
With his feud with Triple H now over, Chris Jericho decided to enter the King of the Ring tournament, with the winner to receive a WWE Undisputed Championship match on August 25 at SummerSlam. Jericho was scheduled to compete against Edge in the first round tournament, but Edge forfeited his match to Jericho due to a legit shoulder injury. Jericho advanced as far as the semi-finals, losing to Rob Van Dam. On the May 30 episode of SmackDown!, The Undertaker defeated Randy Orton to retain the WWE Undisputed Championship. Afterward, Triple H assaulted The Undertaker and demanded a title shot. During Triple H's match against Test, The Undertaker interfered, enabling Test to nail Triple H with a big boot for the pin. Afterwards, The Undertaker nailed Triple H with multiple chair shots to his elbow. On the June 6 episode of SmackDown!, Triple H became the number one contender to the WWE Undisputed Championship by defeating Hollywood Hulk Hogan. Triple H faced The Undertaker for the championship at King of the Ring, only to lose despite interference on his behalf from a returning The Rock.

Kurt Angle and Edge continued to feud for a few weeks after Judgment Day, and Edge was later joined by Hollywood Hulk Hogan on the May 30 episode of SmackDown!. On that episode, while Hogan had a stare down with the SmackDown! Owner Mr. McMahon, Angle attacked Hogan with a steel pipe. Later that night, Hogan interfered in a steel cage match between Angle and Edge by assaulting Angle. Moments later, Edge hit a spear on Angle from the top rope and won the match. In the process, Edge legitimately injured his arm and would be forced out of action for a month. The centerpiece of this feud was a hairpiece Angle was wearing after being shaven bald, which he held to his head with a piece of amateur wrestling headgear. On the June 13 episode of SmackDown!, Angle and The Undertaker were scheduled to wrestle Hogan and Triple H, but The Undertaker and Angle assaulted Hogan before the match started. After Angle and The Undertaker defeated Triple H by disqualification, Hogan went after Angle and eventually stripped Angle's wig from his head, which led to a match between the two at King of the Ring. At King of the Ring, Angle defeated Hogan by submission.

Brock Lesnar ended his feud with The Hardy Boyz and entered the King of the Ring tournament. On Raw, Lesnar defeated Bubba Ray Dudley in the first round tournament, then the following week he defeated Booker T in the quarter-finals. At the King of the Ring event, he defeated Test in the semifinals then went on to defeat Rob Van Dam in the finals, which earned him the SummerSlam title shot against the WWE Undisputed Champion.

After Judgment Day, "Stone Cold" Steve Austin continued his feud with Ric Flair, which added both Eddie Guerrero and a returning-from-injury Chris Benoit (who was last seen in June 2001 at King of the Ring due to neck injury). However, the feud ended abruptly with Austin's unexpected departure from the company on June 10 for his refusal to lose a hotshotted match to Brock Lesnar. That same night, Flair lost his half of WWE's ownership to Mr. McMahon and returned to active wrestling. Austin would return in 2003 and he would face The Rock at WrestleMania XIX in a losing effort, which would turn out to be Austin's last match until WrestleMania 38.

Eddie Guerrero's feud with Rob Van Dam ended on the May 27 episode of Raw, when he lost the Intercontinental Championship in a ladder match. Two weeks later on Raw, he lost to Van Dam again in the King of the Ring first round tournament. He went on to face Ric Flair at King of the Ring in place of "Stone Cold" Steve Austin and lost the match after interference from Bubba Ray Dudley, with whom Guerrero entered a feud the following night on Raw. After pinning Bubba Ray, Guerrero had the table set up, only for Bubba Ray to put him through it. Chris Benoit then applied the Crippler Crossface on Bubba Ray. The following week on Raw, Benoit and Guerrero fought Bubba Ray and Spike Dudley in a tag team match, which Bubba Ray and Spike won. Afterwards, as Spike tried to execute the Dudley Dog on Benoit, the latter countered it and tossed him through a table. Benoit then applied the Crippler Crossface on Bubba Ray while Guerrero frog splashed Bubba Ray from behind. The following two weeks on Raw, Benoit and Guerrero had defeated Bubba Ray and Spike in two different tag team matches. Then on July 21 at Vengeance, Bubba Ray and Spike defeated Benoit and Guerrero in a tag team elimination tables match when Bubba Ray last eliminated Benoit following a Bubba Bomb. On the July 29 episode of Raw, after Benoit defeated Van Dam for the Intercontinental Championship, he and Guerrero would then defect to the SmackDown! brand during a storyline "open season" on wrestler contracts, with Benoit taking his newly won Intercontinental Championship with him. Van Dam defeated Benoit for the title on August 25 at SummerSlam and returned the title to the Raw brand.

Trish Stratus concluded her feud with Stacy Keibler after defeating Keibler in the bra and panties match on the May 25 episode of Velocity. She was then challenged by a returning Molly Holly, who returned with a drastic attitude change and new look. Holly's return took place on April 1, when she attacked Stratus. On the June 3 episode of Raw, Stratus successfully defended the WWE Women's Championship against Terri Runnels in a lingerie match. Holly then appeared to the ring with brass knuckles only for Stratus to nail her in the head with the title belt then took her undergarments off and threw them in Holly's face. The following week on Raw, after Holly defeated Stratus in a non-title match, she took Stratus's undergarments and choked her out with it. At King of the Ring, Stratus lost the match and the title to Holly after Holly executed a belly to belly suplex and pinned her with a handful of tights for leverage.

== Results ==
No.	Results	Stipulations	Times
1^{H}	William Regal (c) defeated D'Lo Brown	Singles match for the WWE European Championship	6:22
2	Eddie Guerrero (c) defeated Rob Van Dam	Singles match for the WWE Intercontinental Championship	10:57
3	Trish Stratus (c) (with Bubba Ray Dudley) defeated Stacy Keibler (with Deacon Batista and Reverend D-Von)	Singles match for the WWE Women's Championship	2:54
4	Brock Lesnar and Paul Heyman defeated The Hardy Boyz (Jeff Hardy and Matt Hardy)	Tag team match	4:47
5	"Stone Cold" Steve Austin defeated Big Show and Ric Flair	Handicap match	15:36
6	Edge defeated Kurt Angle	Hair vs. Hair match	15:30
7	Triple H defeated Chris Jericho	Hell in a Cell match	24:06
8	Rico and Rikishi defeated Billy and Chuck (c)	Tag team match for the WWE Tag Team Championship	3:50
9	The Undertaker defeated Hollywood Hulk Hogan (c)	Singles match for the WWE Undisputed Championship	11:06
(c) / – the champion(s) heading into the match; H / – the match was broadcast prior to the pay-per-view on Sunday Night Heat
