= WWF Judgment Day (2001) =

World Wrestling Federation pay-per-view event

Judgment Day
- Promotional poster featuring Stone Cold Steve Austin and Triple H
- Promotion: World Wrestling Federation
- Date: May 20, 2001
- City: Sacramento, California
- Venue: ARCO Arena
- Attendance: 13,623
- Buy rate: 405,000

Pay-per-view chronology
← Previous; Insurrextion	Next → King of the Ring

Judgment Day chronology
← Previous; 2000	Next → 2002

The 2001 Judgment Day was a professional wrestling pay-per-view (PPV) event produced by the World Wrestling Federation (WWF, now WWE) and sponsored by RC Cola. It was the third Judgment Day and took place on May 20, 2001, at the ARCO Arena in Sacramento, California. This was the last Judgment Day held before the introduction of the brand extension in March 2002. It was also the final Judgment Day promoted under the WWF name as the promotion was renamed to World Wrestling Entertainment (WWE) in May 2002, although early promotional material for that year's Judgment Day event still bore the WWF logo.

Seven professional wrestling matches were featured on the event's card. The main event was "Stone Cold" Steve Austin defending the WWF Championship against The Undertaker in a No Holds Barred match. The featured bouts on the undercard included Triple H defending the Intercontinental Championship against Kane in a Chain match, and a Two-out-of three falls match between Kurt Angle and Chris Benoit for Angle's 1996 Olympic Gold Medals.

The event grossed over $670,000 in ticket sales from an attendance of 13,623, which was higher than the previous year's event.

== Production ==
=== Background ===
Judgment Day was first held as the 25th In Your House pay-per-view (PPV) event in October 1998; In Your House was a series of monthly professional wrestling PPV shows first produced by the World Wrestling Federation (WWF, now WWE) in May 1995. The In Your House branding was retired following February 1999's St. Valentine's Day Massacre: In Your House event, as the company moved to install permanent names for each of its monthly PPVs. After two years, Judgment Day returned in May 2000 as its own PPV, replacing Over the Edge, thus establishing Judgment Day as the annual May PPV for the promotion. The third Judgment Day event was held on May 20, 2001, at the ARCO Arena in Sacramento, California.

=== Storylines ===
The event featured seven professional wrestling matches with outcomes predetermined by the WWF's creative writers.

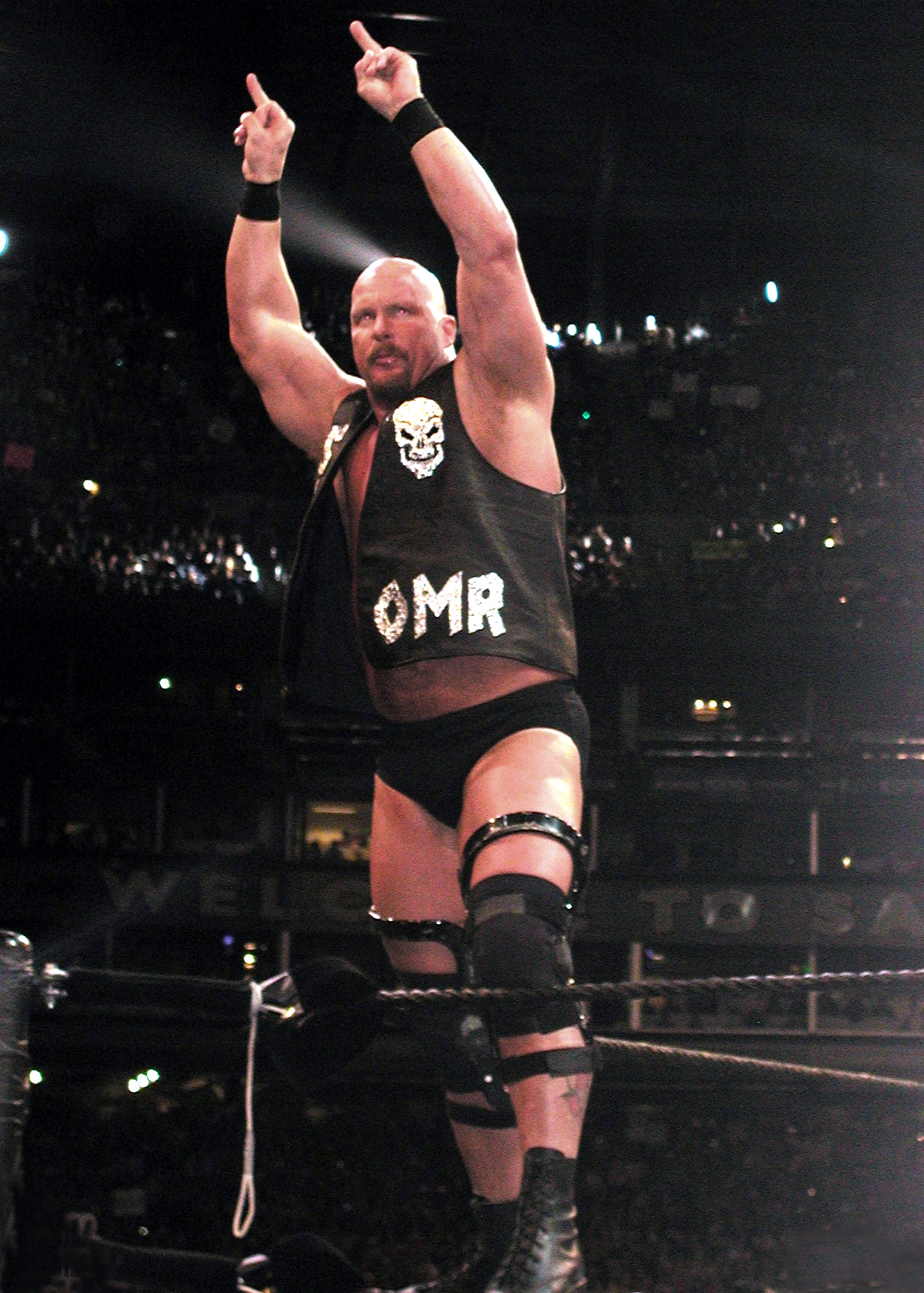
"Stone Cold" Steve Austin defended the WWF Championship against The Undertaker

The main event at Judgment Day featured a No Holds Barred match, a match with no disqualifications nor countouts, in which "Stone Cold" Steve Austin defended the WWF Championship against The Undertaker. The buildup to the match began on the April 30 episode of Raw Is War, Austin retained the WWF Championship against The Undertaker, though by disqualification after executing a low blow on The Undertaker, thus resulting in the decision. In the following weeks, The Undertaker attacked Austin, and at one point taking his vest and the WWF Championship. Around that time, The Undertaker received a phone call stating that his wife, Sara, had been involved in a car accident. The Undertaker found out that everything was okay and that there had not been a car accident at all. The Undertaker began to hunt down whoever made the phone call. On the May 17 episode of SmackDown!, during The Undertaker's match with Triple H, Austin appeared on the Titantron and admitted that he and Triple H were the ones who had made the phone call. During the early part of the pay-per-view, The Undertaker threatened to inflict bodily harm on Commissioner William Regal unless he made the title match a No Holds Barred match, which Regal did.

The buildup to the Two-out-of-three falls match started after Chris Benoit stole Kurt Angle's medals by picking them up from the ring after throwing Angle over the top rope and out of the ring. This rivalry escalated more when Benoit announced that he was going to keep the gold medals in a "safe" and "warm" place, which turned out to be in the crotch of his tights. On the following SmackDown!, Angle faced Benoit and retrieved his medals, but when he went to kiss them he was repulsed by Benoit's crotch odor, which gave Benoit enough time to apply the Crippler Crossface on Angle. Angle dropped the medals and submitted, and on the following Raw Is War Angle challenged Benoit to a Two-out-of-three falls match. The first fall would be a pinfalls-only match, and the second a submission match. If the third fall was needed, it would be contested as a ladder match.

One main event at Judgment Day featured a Chain match, with Triple H defending his WWF Intercontinental Championship against Kane. The buildup to the match all started after WrestleMania X-Seven on the April 5 episode of SmackDown! when Triple H won the Intercontinental title by defeating Chris Jericho after WWF Commissioner William Regal interfered. Two weeks later on SmackDown!, Triple H and "Stone Cold" Steve Austin interfered in Kane's WWF Hardcore Championship defense against Rhyno by injuring his left arm with multiple steel chair shots, enabling Rhyno to win the title. At Backlash, WWF Champion, Austin and WWF Intercontinental Champion, Triple H defeated The Undertaker and Kane to win the WWF Tag Team Championship in a tag team match, in which Austin's WWF title and Triple H's Intercontinental title were also on the line after interference from both Stephanie McMahon-Helmsley and her father Vince McMahon. The following night on Monday Night's Raw Is War, Kane was scheduled to challenge Austin for the WWF Championship, but Kane was attacked backstage by Austin and Triple H before the match even started. Therefore, The Undertaker replaced Kane in the WWF Championship match and defeated Austin by disqualification, but did not win the WWF Title because of the disqualification. Afterward, Kane came down to the ring to save The Undertaker from the assault given to him by Austin and Triple H, but Kane ended up being put out of action for two weeks after Austin and Triple H targeted his left arm. Kane returned on the May 10 episode of SmackDown! and saved The Undertaker from an assault by Austin. On the May 14 episode of Raw Is War, Triple H announced a chain match for the WWF Intercontinental Championship between himself and Kane at Judgment Day.

== Event ==
Other on-screen personnel
Role:	Name:
Commentator	Jim Ross
Commentator	Paul Heyman
Commentator	Carlos Cabrera (Spanish)
Commentator	Hugo Savinovich (Spanish)
Interviewer	Jonathan Coachman
Interviewer	Michael Cole
Ring announcer	Howard Finkel
Referee	Mike Chioda
Referee	Jim Korderas
Referee	Earl Hebner
Referee	Jack Doan
Referee	Tim White
Referee	Theodore Long
Referee	Chad Patton

Before the event began, a match took place on Heat, in which Raven defeated Val Venis.

In another Heat match, The Holly Cousins (Hardcore Holly and Crash Holly) defeated Kaientai (Taka Michinoku and Funaki).

=== Preliminary matches ===
The event opened with WWF commissioner William Regal facing Rikishi. Regal performed a Regal Cutter on Rikishi to win the match.

Next, Kurt Angle faced Chris Benoit in a Two-out-of-three falls match for Angle's Olympic Gold Medal, with the first fall being a Singles match. Angle performed Rolling German Suplexes on Benoit and attempted a Diving Headbutt but Benoit avoided. Benoit performed an Angle Slam on Angle to win the first fall. The second fall was a Submission match. Angle performed an Angle Slam on Benoit and forced Benoit to submit to the Ankle Lock to win the second fall. The third fall was a Ladder match. Benoit applied a Crippler Crossface on Angle, who passed out. Edge and Christian interfered, attacking Benoit. Angle retrieved his Olympic Gold Medal to win the match.

After that, Rhyno defended the WWF Hardcore Championship against Test and Big Show. Big Show and Test started fighting before Rhyno got involved. Test attempted to strangle Big Show with a rope but Rhyno stopped Test. Rhyno threw a trash can at Big Show and then ran up the steel steps that were brought into the ring and performed a Gore to retain the title.

Next, Chyna defended the WWF Women's Championship against Lita. Chyna performed a Powerbomb on Lita to retain the title. Late in the match, Eddie Guerrero came out to watch. After the match, Chyna and Lita hugged out of respect.

After that, Triple H defended the WWF Intercontinental Championship against Kane in a Chain match. WWF Champion "Stone Cold" Steve Austin interfered, allowing Triple H to attack Kane with a low blow. Austin accidentally hit Triple H with a steel chair, allowing Kane to pin Triple H to win the title.

Later was a Tag team turmoil match to determine who would be the #1 Contenders to the WWF Tag Team Championship. Dean Malenko and Perry Saturn were eliminated by The APA (Bradshaw and Faarooq) after Faarooq pinned Saturn following a Spinebuster. The Dudley Boyz (Bubba Ray Dudley and D-Von Dudley) were eliminated by the APA after Bradshaw pinned Bubba following a Clothesline From Hell. The APA were eliminated by X-Factor (X-Pac and Justin Credible) after Albert tripped Bradshaw, allowing X-Pac to pin him. The Hardy Boyz (Matt Hardy and Jeff Hardy) were eliminated by X-Factor after X-Pac and Credible performed a double Superkick on Matt. X-Factor were eliminated by Chris Jericho and Chris Benoit after X-Pac submitted to the Walls of Jericho by Jericho and the Crippler Crossface by Benoit, which were applied simultaneously. Edge and Christian were eliminated by Jericho and Benoit after Benoit forced Christian to submit to the Crippler Crossface, meaning Jericho and Benoit won the match, and #1 Contendership for the WWF Tag Team Championship in the near future.

=== Main event ===
In the main event, "Stone Cold" Steve Austin defended the WWF Championship against The Undertaker in a No Holds Barred match. The Undertaker performed a Chokeslam through the announce table on Austin. Austin struck The Undertaker with a chair and performed a Stone Cold Stunner on The Undertaker for a near-fall. The Undertaker performed a Chokeslam on Austin and struck Austin with a chair. Triple H attempted to interfere but The Undertaker struck Triple H with the chair. The Undertaker attempted a Last Ride on Austin but Triple H struck The Undertaker with a sledgehammer. Austin pinned The Undertaker to retain the title.

== Aftermath ==
By virtue of their victory in the tag team turmoil match, Chris Benoit and Chris Jericho were given a match against The Power Trip ("Stone Cold" Steve Austin and Triple H) for the WWF Tag Team Championship on the next night's Raw. During the match, Triple H misstepped while breaking a submission hold on Austin and legitimately tore one of his quadriceps. Late in the contest, Triple H tried to break up a pin by striking Jericho with his sledgehammer, but Jericho moved and Austin was hit in the chest instead. He was then pinned, which cost the Power Trip their tag team titles. Triple H went on to miss the rest of the year, while Austin began feuding with both Benoit and Jericho by himself. Austin would eventually cost Benoit and Jericho their titles when he assisted the Dudley Boyz in defeating them just before King of the Ring. At King of the Ring, Austin defeated Benoit and Jericho in a Triple Threat Match to retain the WWF Championship. The feud came to an abrupt end, however, after Benoit suffered a broken neck during the match and was out of action for nearly a year.

With their respective feud ending, The Brothers of Destruction moved on to other endeavors. Kane would eventually lose the Intercontinental Championship to Albert while The Undertaker began a feud with a mystery man who had been stalking his wife. That man unmasked himself as Diamond Dallas Page, and the two would feud off and on for the next several months as the Invasion began.

Judgment Day would become Chyna's final match with the promotion as she left the WWF over a contract dispute soon after the pay-per-view. The Women's Championship would remain inactive until November 18, 2001 at Survivor Series where a 6-Pack Challenge between Trish Stratus, Lita, Jacqueline, Ivory, Mighty Molly and a debuting Jazz would determine the new champion. The championship was ultimately won by Stratus at the event.

The 2001 Judgment Day was the last held under the WWF name, as the promotion was renamed to World Wrestling Entertainment (WWE) in May 2002. It was also the last Judgment Day held before the promotion introduced the brand extension in March 2002, a storyline subdivision in which the promotion divided its roster into two separate brands, Raw and SmackDown!, where wrestlers were exclusively assigned to perform.

== Results ==
No.	Results	Stipulations	Times
1^{H}	Raven defeated Val Venis	Singles match	—
2^{H}	The Holly Cousins (Crash Holly and Hardcore Holly) (with Molly Holly) defeated Kaientai (Funaki and Taka Michinoku)	Tag team match	—
3	William Regal defeated Rikishi	Singles match	3:56
4	Kurt Angle defeated Chris Benoit 2–1	Two-out-of-three falls match for Angle's Olympic Gold Medal: 1. Pinfalls only (won by Benoit); 2. Submissions only (won by Angle); 3. Ladder match (won by Angle)	23:58
5	Rhyno (c) defeated Big Show and Test	Triple threat hardcore match for the WWF Hardcore Championship	9:15
6	Chyna (c) defeated Lita	Singles match for the WWF Women's Championship	6:30
7	Kane defeated Triple H (c) (with Stephanie McMahon-Helmsley)	Chain match for the WWF Intercontinental Championship	12:24
8	Chris Jericho and Chris Benoit won by last eliminating Edge and Christian	Tag team turmoil match to determine the #1 contenders to the WWF Tag Team Championship	25:53
9	"Stone Cold" Steve Austin (c) defeated The Undertaker	No Holds Barred match for the WWF Championship	23:06
(c) / – the champion(s) heading into the match; H / – the match was broadcast prior to the pay-per-view on Sunday Night Heat

Tag team turmoil match

Draw	Wrestler	Order	Eliminated by
1	The APA (Bradshaw and Faarooq)	3	X-Factor
2	Dean Malenko and Perry Saturn (with Terri)	1	APA
3	The Dudley Boyz (Bubba Ray Dudley and D-Von Dudley) (with Spike Dudley)	2	APA
4	X-Factor (X-Pac and Justin Credible) (with Albert)	5	Chris Jericho and Chris Benoit
5	The Hardy Boyz (Matt Hardy and Jeff Hardy)	4	X-Factor
6	Chris Jericho and Chris Benoit		Winners
7	Edge and Christian	6	Chris Jericho and Chris Benoit
