= King of the Ring (2001) =

World Wrestling Federation pay-per-view event

- Promotional poster
- Promotion: World Wrestling Federation
- Date: June 24, 2001
- City: East Rutherford, New Jersey
- Venue: Continental Airlines Arena
- Attendance: 17,777
- Buy rate: 445,000
- Tagline: My Muscles Ache. My Mind Is Spent. My Body Is Broken. Lead me to my throne.

Pay-per-view chronology
← Previous; Judgment Day	Next → Invasion

King of the Ring event chronology
← Previous; 2000	Next → 2002

King of the Ring tournament chronology
← Previous; 2000	Next → 2002

The 2001 King of the Ring was a professional wrestling pay-per-view (PPV) event produced by the World Wrestling Federation (WWF, now WWE). It was the ninth annual King of the Ring event and hosted the finals of the 15th King of the Ring tournament for men. The event took place on June 24, 2001, at the Continental Airlines Arena in East Rutherford, New Jersey. It was the final King of the Ring PPV and tournament held before the introduction of the first brand extension in March 2002, and the last for both held under the WWF name as the promotion was renamed to World Wrestling Entertainment (WWE) in May 2002.

The main event was a Triple threat match, a match involving three competitors, for the WWF Championship. "Stone Cold" Steve Austin defeated Chris Benoit and Chris Jericho to retain the title. The undercard featured the 2001 King of the Ring tournament, which was won by Edge.

There were other matches on the undercard, including a Street Fight between Kurt Angle and Shane McMahon, a WWF Light Heavyweight Championship match between champion Jeff Hardy and challenger X-Pac, and a WWF Tag Team Championship between champions The Dudley Boyz (Bubba Ray Dudley and D-Von Dudley) and the challenger team of Kane and Spike Dudley. The show was also notable for featuring the WWF debut of Booker T from the former World Championship Wrestling (WCW), a company that the WWF acquired earlier that year in March.

== Production ==
=== Background ===
King of the Ring was a professional wrestling pay-per-view (PPV) event held annually in June by the World Wrestling Federation (WWF, now WWE) since 1993. The PPV was named after the King of the Ring tournament, a men's single-elimination tournament that was established in 1985 and held annually until 1991, except for 1990, with the winner crowned the "King of the Ring"; these early tournaments were held as special non-televised house shows. Unlike the non-televised events, the PPV did not feature all of the tournament's matches. Instead, several of the qualifying matches preceded the event with the final few matches then taking place at the pay-per-view. Other matches took place at the event as it was a traditional three-hour pay-per-view. The King of the Ring event became considered as one of the WWF's "Big Five" PPVs, along with the Royal Rumble, WrestleMania, SummerSlam, and Survivor Series, the company's five biggest annual shows of the year. The ninth King of the Ring PPV hosted the finals of the 15th tournament and it was held on June 24, 2001 at the Continental Airlines Arena in East Rutherford, New Jersey.

=== Storylines ===
King of the Ring featured professional wrestling matches that involved different wrestlers from pre-existing feuds, plots, and storylines that were played out on Raw is War and SmackDown!—World Wrestling Federation's (WWF) television programs. Wrestlers portrayed a villain or a hero as they followed a series of events that built tension, and culminated in a wrestling match or series of matches.

The pay-per-view event featured the annual King of the Ring single elimination bracket tournament. The qualification for the tournament started on the June 4, 2001 episode of Raw is War, with Jeff Hardy and Rhyno defeating Matt Hardy and Tazz respectively. The qualification continued on the June 7 episode of SmackDown!, as Kurt Angle defeated Hardcore Holly and Edge defeated Test. On the June 11 episode of Raw is War, Christian and Perry Saturn defeated Kane and Steve Blackman in respective matches to qualify for the tournament. On the June 14 episode of SmackDown!, qualification ended as Big Show defeated Raven and Tajiri defeated Crash Holly. On the June 18 episode of Raw is War, the quarterfinal round occurred as Kurt Angle defeated Jeff Hardy, Rhyno defeated Tajiri, Edge defeated Perry Saturn and Christian defeated Big Show.

The main rivalry heading into the event was between "Stone Cold" Steve Austin, Chris Benoit and Chris Jericho for the WWF Championship. At Judgment Day, Benoit and Jericho won a Tag Team Turmoil match to become the #1 contenders for the WWF Tag Team Championship. The next night, on the May 21, 2001 episode of Raw is War, Benoit and Jericho defeated The Two-Man Power Trip (Steve Austin and Triple H) for the Tag Team Championship. Triple H suffered a legitimate quadriceps injury and was out of action for nearly a year. Austin started to feud with Benoit and Jericho. Austin defeated Benoit and Jericho in separate title matches. On the June 11 episode of Raw is War, it was announced that Austin would defend the title against Benoit and Jericho in a Triple Threat match at King of the Ring.

Another preliminary feud heading into the event was between Kurt Angle and Shane McMahon. On the May 21 episode of Raw is War, McMahon interrupted Angle's celebration of regaining his Olympic gold medals from Chris Benoit, the previous night at Judgment Day. McMahon announced that WCW was coming back and mocked Angle, which led to Angle executing an Angle Slam on McMahon. On the June 11 episode of Raw is War, McMahon attacked Angle with an Angle Slam after Angle was attacked by The Undertaker. This led to a match between Angle and McMahon at King of the Ring.

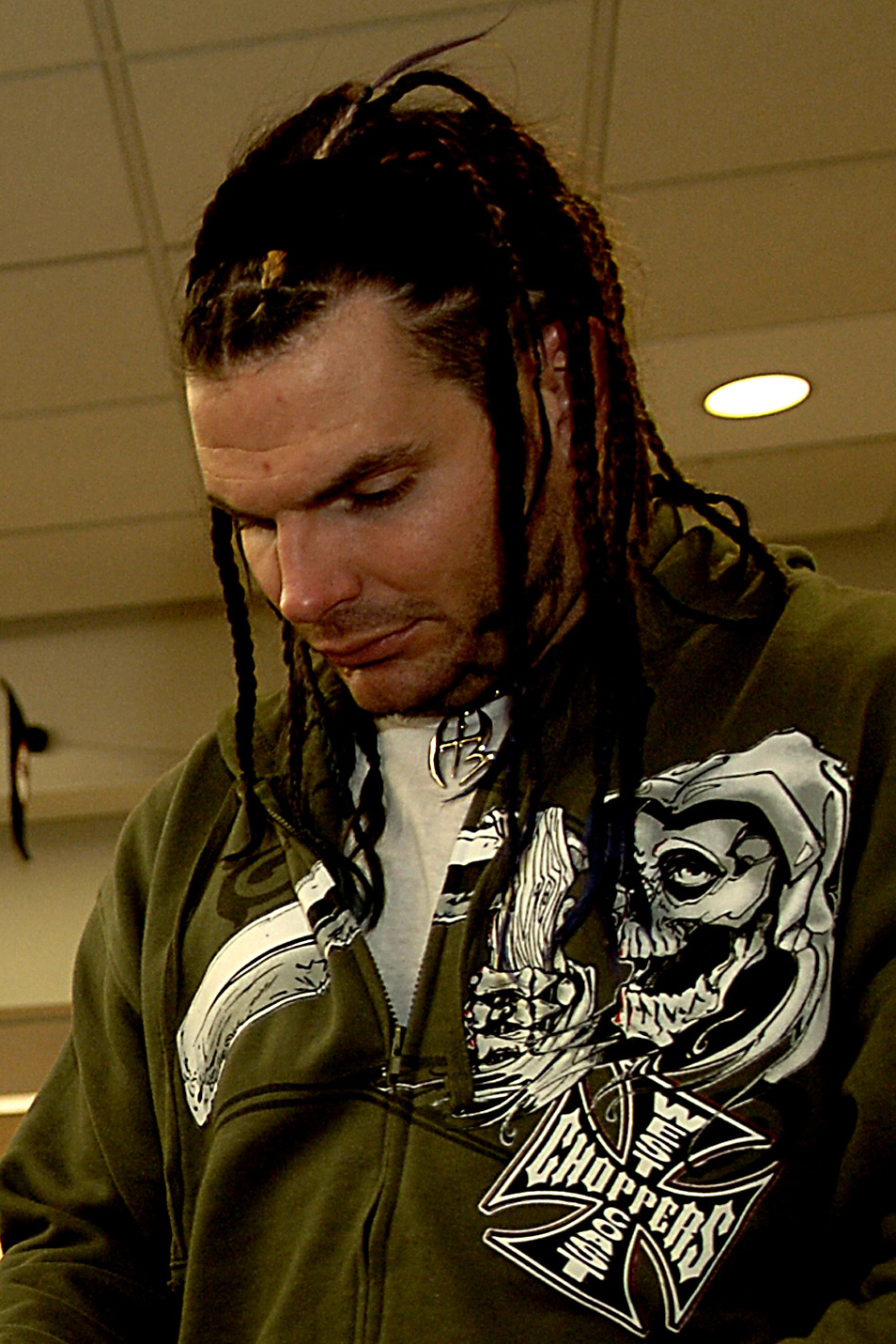
Jeff Hardy defended the WWF Light Heavyweight Championship against X-Pac at King of the Ring.

On the June 11 episode of Raw is War, Hardy Boyz (Matt Hardy and Jeff Hardy) defeated X-Factor (X-Pac and Justin Credible) in a tag team match when Jeff pinned X-Pac. After the match, X-Pac hit Jeff with a steel chair. This led to a match between Jeff and X-Pac for Jeff's WWF Light Heavyweight Championship match at King of the Ring.

Spike Dudley, a member of the Dudley Boyz with Bubba Ray Dudley and D-Von Dudley, split from the group when Bubba and D-Von started to turn into villains. Spike started a storyline affair with Molly Holly of Holly Cousins (Hardcore Holly and Crash Holly), rivals of the Dudley Boyz. On the May 21 episode of Raw is War, Bubba and D-Von powerbombed Molly on a table but Spike laid down on the table to protect Molly. On the June 21 episode of SmackDown!, Dudley Boyz defeated Chris Benoit and Chris Jericho for the WWF Tag Team Championship, leading to a title defense for Dudley Boyz against Spike and a partner of Spike's choosing at King of the Ring.

Another major storyline in the WWF heading into the event was that a mystery man was stalking The Undertaker's wife, Sara. On the June 11 episode of Raw is War, Undertaker confronted Kurt Angle as he thought that Angle was Sara's stalker. Angle refused to claim that he was the stalker and insulted Sara, prompting Undertaker to hit Angle with a Last Ride. On the June 18 episode of Raw is War, Diamond Dallas Page debuted in WWF and revealed that he was Sara's stalker.

== Event ==
Other on-screen personnel
Role:	Name:
English commentators	Jim Ross
English commentators	Paul Heyman
Spanish commentators	Carlos Cabrera (Spanish)
Spanish commentators	Hugo Savinovich (Spanish)
Backstage interviewers	Jonathan Coachman
Backstage interviewers	Tazz
Ring announcer	Howard Finkel
Referees	Mike Chioda
Referees	Jim Korderas
Referees	Earl Hebner
Referees	Jack Doan
Referees	Mike Sparks
Referees	Teddy Long
Referees	Chad Patton

Before the event aired live on pay-per-view, Matt Hardy defended the WWF European Championship against Justin Credible in a match that aired live on Sunday Night Heat. Hardy's valet Lita hit Credible with a Diving Hurricanrana. Hardy pinned Credible to retain the European Championship.

=== Preliminary matches ===
As the show began, the semi-final round of the King of the Ring tournament started with Kurt Angle wrestling against his teammate Christian. Angle dominated the match earlier on and tried to finish it quickly but Christian started getting momentum over Angle. Angle quickly regained momentum by hitting Christian with a series of suplexes. Christian eventually hit Angle with a Spinning Heel Kick. Christian started dominating the match until Shane McMahon interfered in the match and prevented Christian from winning the match. Angle took advantage and hit Christian with an Olympic Slam for the victory.

The next match in the semi-final was between Edge and Rhyno. Rhyno dominated most of the match and untied a turnbuckle pad. Both men eventually knocked out each other by Spearing and hitting a Gore on each other. Rhyno tried to hit another Gore on Edge but Edge avoided the move and Rhyno hit the untied turnbuckle. Edge followed by hitting Rhyno with an Edgecution to advance to the final round.

The third match was Dudley Boyz's (Bubba Ray Dudley and D-Von Dudley) scheduled title defense of the WWF Tag Team Championship against Spike Dudley and a mystery partner. The mystery partner was revealed to be the current Intercontinental champion Kane. Spike battled the Dudley Boyz for most of the match until Kane was tagged in. Kane dominated the Dudley Boyz until Spike was tagged in again. Spike hit Bubba with a Dudley Dog and tried to pin Bubba for the victory. However, D-Von prevented Spike from pinning Bubba and the Dudley Boyz hit Spike with a 3-D to retain the Tag Team Championship.

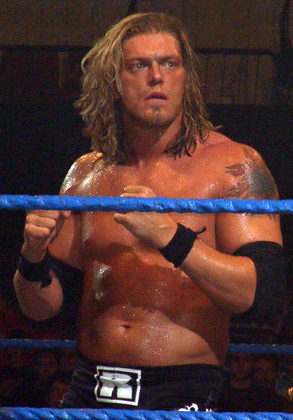
Edge won the 2001 King of the Ring tournament.

The fourth match was the final round of the King of the Ring tournament between Kurt Angle and Edge. Angle focused on Edge's ribs that were injured during his match with Rhyno. Angle dominated most of the match against Edge before applying an Ankle Lock on Edge. Edge reversed the hold into a pinfall but Christian distracted the referee to prevent Edge from winning the match. Angle applied another Ankle Lock on Edge and Edge tapped out to the hold but the match continued as the referee was still distracted. Shane McMahon interfered in the match by spearing Angle. Edge followed it by hitting Angle with an Edgecution to win the 2001 King of the Ring tournament.

The fifth match pitted Jeff Hardy defending the WWF Light Heavyweight Championship against X-Pac. Hardy dominated earlier part of the match until X-Pac got control of the match. Throughout the match, Hardy and X-Pac did cruiserweight action. In the closing moments of the match, X-Pac hit Hardy with an X-Factor and pinned him. However, as the match ended, the referee realized that Hardy's foot was on the rope and the match continued. Hardy executed a Swanton Bomb and got the pinfall to retain the Light Heavyweight Championship.

=== Main event matches ===
Before the Street Fight between Kurt Angle and Shane McMahon occurred, Diamond Dallas Page invited The Undertaker to the ring as videos of DDP's personal life were being aired by The Undertaker's wife Sara throughout the event. The Undertaker and DDP had a confrontation which quickly turned into a brawl. The Undertaker began dominating the brawl until DDP escaped the arena through the crowd, while Sara videotaped him leaving.

After that, the Street Fight match between Angle and McMahon began. The match went back and forth as Angle dominated earlier part of the match until McMahon got control of the match. The action spilled outside the ring with both men using weapons and items of the arena on each other. A notable part of the match occurred when Angle failed to suplex McMahon through a plate glass window, which was a part of the set. It took multiple attempts to break the glass, with each failure resulting in McMahon landing on his head and neck. Angle performed an Angle Slam on McMahon from the top rope to win the match.

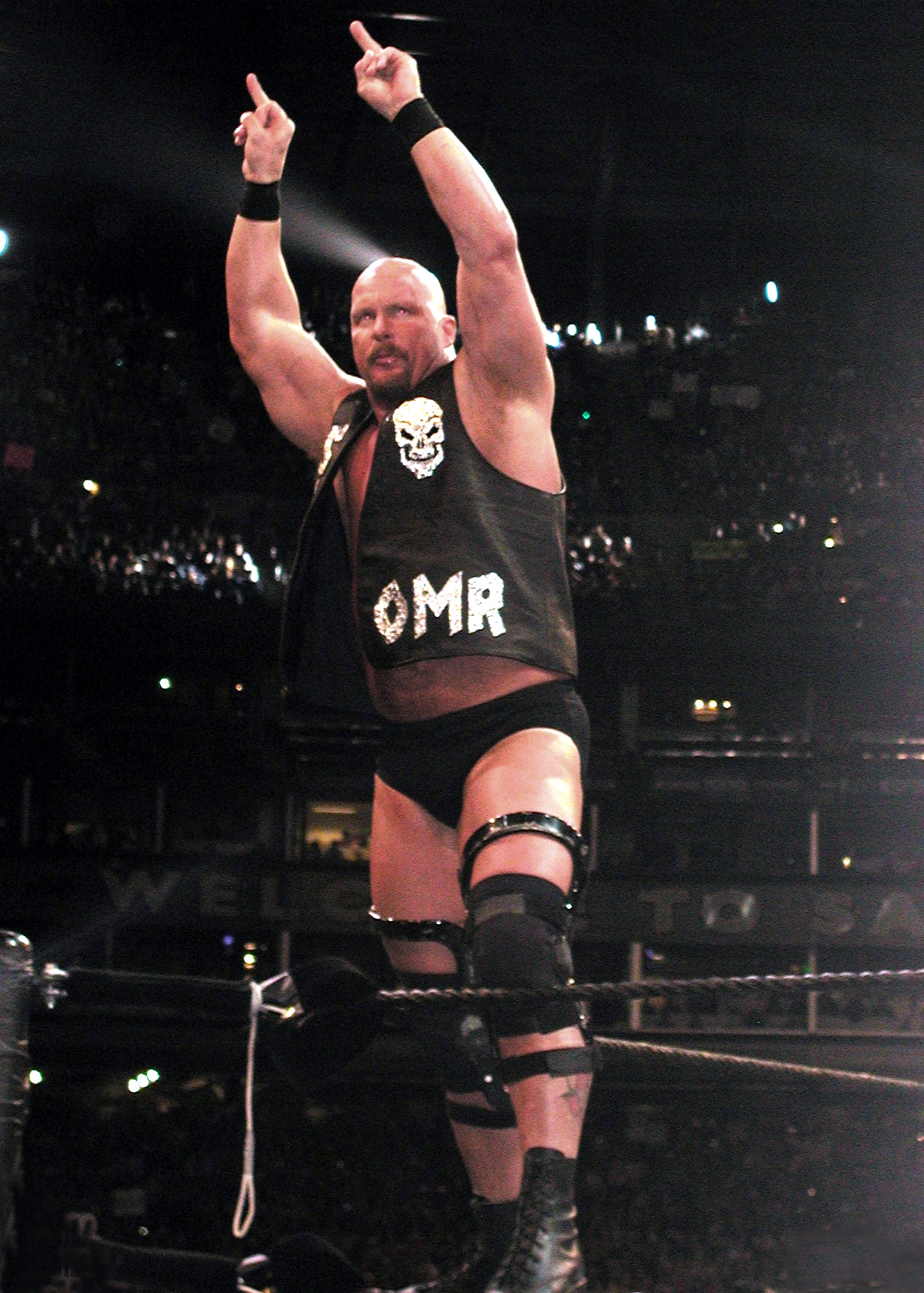
"Stone Cold" Steve Austin defended the WWF Championship against Chris Benoit and Chris Jericho at King of the Ring.

The main event was a Triple Threat match for the WWF Championship. "Stone Cold" Steve Austin defended the title against Chris Jericho and Chris Benoit. Benoit and Jericho chased Austin outside the ring and forced him to return to the ring. Austin started attacking Benoit until Benoit and Jericho double-teamed Austin. After Austin was attacked, Benoit and Jericho battled each other. Jericho trapped Austin in the Walls of Jericho until Benoit suplexed Jericho outside the ring. Benoit then locked in the Crossface on Austin. The action continued as all the three men continued to attack each other. At one point in the match, both Jericho and Benoit forced Austin to submit to the Walls of Jericho and Crippler Crossface at the same time. However, since there could be only one winner, the match continued. The WCW Champion Booker T made his WWF debut and attacked Austin with a Scissors Kick and a belly-to-back suplex through an announce table. Benoit would follow by executing a back-suplex off the top-rope on Jericho, which legitimately broke Benoit's neck. Austin would crawl over to Benoit and pin him to retain the WWF Championship.

== Aftermath ==
Chris Benoit suffered a career-halting neck injury after his Triple Threat match at King of the Ring and was out of action for one year. Shane McMahon and WCW wrestlers started involving themselves in the WWF, which led to the beginning of The Invasion storyline. The storyline had WWF wrestlers battle against invaders from WCW and ECW.

The King of the Ring tournament caused Team RECK (Rhyno, Edge, Christian and Kurt Angle) to split due to battling each other in the semifinals of the tournament. Angle began representing WWF against the Alliance whereas Rhyno joined the Alliance. Edge and Christian continued teaming up until the team split when Christian turned on Edge and joined the Alliance after being jealous of Edge's success. Edge and Christian would feud with each other over the WWF Intercontinental Championship.

The 2001 King of the Ring would be the final King of the Ring tournament and PPV held under the WWF name as the promotion was renamed to World Wrestling Entertainment (WWE) in May 2002. It was also the final tournament and PPV held before the promotion introduced the brand extension in March 2002, in which the roster was divided between the Raw and SmackDown! brands where wrestlers were exclusively assigned to perform.

== Results ==
No.	Results	Stipulations	Times
1^{H}	Matt Hardy (c) (with Lita) defeated Justin Credible	Singles match for the WWF European Championship	7:03
2	Kurt Angle defeated Christian	King of the Ring semi-final match	8:51
3	Edge defeated Rhyno	King of the Ring semi-final match	10:20
4	The Dudley Boyz (Bubba Ray and D-Von) (c) defeated Spike Dudley and Kane	Tag team match for the WWF Tag Team Championship	8:24
5	Edge defeated Kurt Angle	King of the Ring final match	10:20
6	Jeff Hardy (c) defeated X-Pac	Singles match for the WWF Light Heavyweight Championship	7:10
7	Kurt Angle defeated Shane McMahon	Street Fight	25:58
8	"Stone Cold" Steve Austin (c) defeated Chris Jericho and Chris Benoit	Triple Threat match for the WWF Championship	27:52
(c) / – the champion(s) heading into the match; H / – the match was broadcast prior to the pay-per-view on Sunday Night Heat

=== Tournament brackets ===
The tournament took place between June 4 and June 24, 2001. The tournament brackets were as follows:

Qualifiers (TV)
Kurt Angle	Pin
Hardcore Holly	6:23
Jeff Hardy	Pin
Matt Hardy	3:55
Christian	Pin
Kane	2:14
Big Show	Pin
Raven	1:37
Edge	Pin
Test	5:51
Steve Blackman	2:03
Perry Saturn	Pin
Crash Holly	3:09
Tajiri	Pin
Rhyno	Pin
Tazz	3:20

Quarterfinals (TV)
Kurt Angle	Sub
Jeff Hardy	3:18
Christian	Pin
Big Show	2:19
Edge	Pin
Perry Saturn	3:49
Tajiri	2:51
Rhyno	Pin

Semifinals (PPV)
Kurt Angle	Pin
Christian	8:51
Edge	Pin
Rhyno	10:20

Final (PPV)
Kurt Angle	10:20
Edge	Pin
