= Rick Dore =

American car builder

Rick Dore is an American custom car designer and builder known for creating custom vehicles and coach-built automobiles. Originally from New York, he began working in the custom car industry during the 1980s and later established Rick Dore Kustoms in California, having first worked in Glendale, Arizona. Dore's focus is American roadsters from the 1930s through 1960s. Metallica's James Hetfield has said “When it comes to building a Kustom car, Rick Dore is in a league of his own.”

Dore gained recognition for designing and building custom cars that have appeared at major automotive exhibitions and competitions in the United States. His work has been featured in automotive publications including Hot Rod, Street Rodder, Rod & Custom, Custom Rodder, and The Rodder's Journal.
