= Billy and Chuck =

Professional wrestling tag team

Tag team
- Members: Billy; Chuck; Rico (manager)
- Name(s): Billy and Chuck; Chuck and Billy
- Billed heights: Billy: 6 ft 5 in (1.96 m); Chuck: 6 ft 7 in (2.01 m)
- Combined billed weight: 534 lb (242 kg; 38.1 st)
- Billed from: Hollywood, California
- Debut: November 6, 2001
- Disbanded: October 14, 2002
- Years active: 2001–2002

Billy and Chuck were a professional wrestling tag team short-lived of Billy Gunn and Chuck Palumbo, who performed in World Wrestling Federation/Entertainment (WWF/WWE) from 2001 to 2002. They were two-time WWE World Tag Team Champions. The two men were depicted as a same-sex couple leading to controversy from hate groups, but praise from equality groups.

== History ==
=== World Wrestling Federation/Entertainment ===
Near the end of the Invasion storyline, Chuck (Palumbo) was kicked out of the Alliance. In response, he defected to the WWF where he began teaming with Billy (Gunn) in an affront to the Alliance. After the Invasion ended, the duo was turned heel.

A storyline began in which Billy and Chuck became increasingly affectionate toward each other, showing evidence of a homosexual relationship. The duo adopted matching red ring gear and bleached their hair with Chuck beginning to wear pigtails, although Chuck would later cut his hair short due to the bleach affecting his hair negatively. Developmental talent Rico was placed in the role of their crafty "personal stylist". Billy and Chuck would win the WWF Tag Team Championships on two occasions, and primarily feud with the APA and the Hardy Boyz.

In September 2002, Chuck proposed life partnership to Billy, and Billy accepted. Their ceremony was aired on the September 12 episode of SmackDown! During the commitment ceremony, Billy and Chuck revealed that the ceremony was merely a publicity stunt that had gone too far, and they admitted they were strictly heterosexual. Eric Bischoff, who had disguised himself as the priest officiating the wedding, and 3-Minute Warning from Raw then led an attack on Stephanie McMahon, the General Manager of SmackDown! who was also present at the ceremony. Following this incident, Rico defected to Raw and managed 3-Minute Warning. Billy and Chuck remained a team, turning face and dropping all facets of their gay-sweetheart gimmick. They would work in a series of house shows.

Billy and Chuck's final match together occurred on SmackDown! in the first round of a tournament for the newly created WWE Tag Team Championship. They lost the match to the team of Ron Simmons and Reverend D-Von. Gunn received a shoulder injury during the match, and was taken off television. Their last match together was at a house show against the Los Guerreros on October 14, 2002 in London, Ontario. The team quietly separated with Chuck going into singles competition and later the Full Blooded Italians; and Billy returned with his Mr. Ass gimmick in June 2003.

Both Gunn and Palumbo were released by WWE in November 2004.

== Reception ==
The Gay & Lesbian Alliance Against Defamation, which had consulted with WWE on the storyline and helped the angle secure mainstream media coverage, denounced WWE for securing GLAAD's assistance under false pretenses. "The WWE lied to us two months ago when they promised that Billy and Chuck would come out and wed on the air." The gimmick would be in sharp contrast to then-current WWE performer Darren Young legitimately coming out over a decade later to TMZ, which was received with open arms and also led to other openly LGBT wrestlers in mainstream wrestling including Sonya DeVille, Anthony Bowens, Nyla Rose, Sonny Kiss, Kiera Hogan, and Mercedes Martinez.

In a shoot interview in 2013, Billy Gunn stated that he had no regrets over the Billy and Chuck storyline, feeling that it was his job to perform the gimmick as presented to him, and would do it again if asked to do it.

Echoing Gunn's comments, in 2021 Chuck Palumbo revealed to Chris Van Vliet that he had no problem with the gimmick, unlike some of his cohorts. Palumbo told those cohorts that all wrestlers are actors in some capacity and had no issue with the gimmick whatsoever. He did admit, however, that his then-six year old daughter was confused with what was going on, and also revealed that Gunn's sons, the Gunns Colten and Austin (both of whom were aware of kayfabe at that point) did have an issue with the gimmick. However, on an episode of Insight with Chris Van Vliet, Austin and Colton revealed they loved the gimmick.

== Championships and accomplishments ==
- Pro Wrestling Illustrated
  - PWI Tag Team of the Year (2002) – Billy and Chuck
- World Wrestling Federation / World Wrestling Entertainment
  - WWF/E Tag Team Championship (2 times)
