= No Way Out (2000) =

World Wrestling Federation pay-per-view event

- Promotional poster featuring Triple H
- Promotion: World Wrestling Federation
- Date: February 27, 2000
- City: Hartford, Connecticut
- Venue: Hartford Civic Center
- Attendance: 12,551
- Buy rate: 480,000
- Tagline: Let the Game Begin.

Pay-per-view chronology
← Previous; Royal Rumble	Next → WrestleMania 2000

No Way Out chronology
← Previous; In Your House	Next → 2001

The 2000 No Way Out was a professional wrestling pay-per-view (PPV) event produced by the World Wrestling Federation (WWF, renamed WWE in 2002). It was the second No Way Out and took place on February 27, 2000, at the Hartford Civic Center in Hartford, Connecticut. The first No Way Out in February 1998 was an In Your House event titled Now Way Out of Texas, but following the discontinuation of the In Your House series after February 1999, a second event was scheduled as its own PPV event but truncated as "No Way Out" as it was not held in Texas, thus being the fourth former In Your House event to do so, after Over the Edge, Fully Loaded, and Unforgiven, and becoming the annual February PPV.

The main event was a Hell in a Cell match, a match where the ring and ringside area was surrounded by a 20-foot-high roofed steel cell between WWF Champion Triple H and Cactus Jack; Triple H won the match to retain his championship. The featured bout on the undercard was a standard wrestling match, also known as a singles match, for a WWF Championship match at WrestleMania 2000 in which Big Show defeated The Rock.

== Production ==
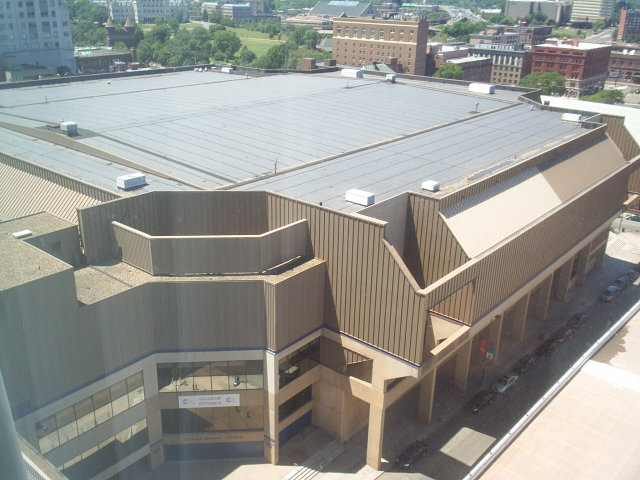
The second No Way Out was held at the Hartford Civic Center in Hartford, Connecticut.

=== Background ===
From May 1995 to February 1999, the professional wrestling company World Wrestling Federation (WWF, renamed WWE in 2002) ran a series of pay-per-view (PPV) events titled In Your House. They aired when the promotion was not holding one of its then-five major PPVs (WrestleMania, King of the Ring, SummerSlam, Survivor Series, and Royal Rumble) and were sold at a lower cost. Following St. Valentine's Day Massacre: In Your House in February 1999, the In Your House branding was retired to give each monthly PPV a permanent identity.

Prior to the discontinuation of the In Your House series, the WWF held No Way Out of Texas: In Your House in February 1998, which was the 20th In Your House event. Two years later, the WWF scheduled a second No Way Out for February 27, 2000, at the Hartford Civic Center in Hartford, Connecticut, promoting it as a standalone event. The event's title was truncated to "No Way Out" as it was not held in Texas and it became the annual February PPV. It was the fourth former In Your House event to continue as its own distinct PPV series, after Over the Edge, Fully Loaded, and Unforgiven.

=== Storylines ===
The event featured eleven professional wrestling matches with outcomes predetermined by the WWF's script writers. The matches featured wrestlers portraying their characters in planned story lines that took place before, during, and after the event.

==== WWF Championship ====
The main feud going into No Way Out was between Triple H and Mick Foley over the WWF Championship. Triple H defeated his (then storyline) father-in-law Vince McMahon at Armageddon in a No Holds Barred match after Stephanie McMahon, whom Triple H had drugged and married her against her will earlier in the year, betrayed her father and began siding with Triple H. This led to the beginning of what was referred to as the McMahon-Helmsley Era, as Vince suddenly departed the company after the match. Stephanie's brother Shane, who was also prominently involved in the feud, left as well, leaving Stephanie and, by proxy, Triple H in charge of the WWF. Immediately the two began to attempt to take out their rivals with the help of a reunited D-Generation X, leading to a pole match between Foley, who was then wrestling as Mankind, and The Rock where the first man to grab a pink slip hanging from the pole would keep his job. Mankind lost, and therefore was fired.

On the January 3, 2000 edition of Raw Is War, Triple H defeated The Big Show to regain the WWF Championship he had lost to him at Survivor Series the prior November. Later that evening, Foley came from the crowd to assist The Rock in a handicap match against DX to prevent him from getting fired. One week later, Mankind was reinstated and wrestled with The Rock and The Acolytes against all four members of DX; Triple H emerged victorious by pinning Mankind after a brutal attack ending with a Pedigree.

It had been announced on Raw that Triple H would defend his title at the Royal Rumble against Mankind, but on the edition of SmackDown! that followed Mankind announced that he was not ready to face Triple H. However, he had a substitute ready and announced him as Cactus Jack, who had not been seen in the WWF since shortly after WrestleMania XIV. The two would face off in a Street Fight, which Triple H won. 2 weeks later on Raw Is War, Triple H would grant Cactus another chance at the title at No Way Out in a match of his choosing; Cactus chose Hell in a Cell and agreed to retire if he lost the match.

==== Rock vs. Big Show ====
Another feud heading into No Way Out was between The Rock and Big Show. Shortly after losing his WWF Championship to Triple H, Big Show turned on The Rock by abandoning him in multiple tag team matches over the course of January. The rivalry intensified at the Royal Rumble, where they were the final two entrants remaining. Big Show went to throw The Rock out of the ring, but before he could do so The Rock countered by trying to toss Big Show over the top rope. Both men went over, but The Rock was able to pull himself back into the ring and was declared the winner, which entitled him to a WWF Championship match at WrestleMania 2000.

What the fans did not see on the live broadcast, however, was an unintended accident that the writers decided to incorporate into the story. The sequence where Big Show was to be eliminated with The Rock using his momentum against him was the scripted finish to the match. However, The Rock's own momentum caused him to land with both of his feet touching the floor before he pulled himself back into the ring.

Therefore, Big Show claimed on the episode of Raw the night after the pay-per-view that The Rock had touched the floor first and thus he should have been declared the winner of the match. Triple H asked for proof and promised Big Show a match with The Rock if he could show the incident. Big Show obliged, and produced a video shot from the side of the ring where the elimination took place that clearly showed The Rock touching the floor before Big Show did. Therefore, a match was signed for No Way Out with the winner getting the WrestleMania title match against the winner of the Triple H-Cactus Jack match.

== Event ==
Before the event began and aired live on pay-per-view, an episode of Sunday Night Heat, one of WWE's secondary television programs, was shown on USA Network. In an interview live in the arena, Michael Cole interviewed Paul Bearer regarding the upcoming Kane vs X-Pac match later that night.

=== Preliminary matches ===
After Sunday Night Heat, the pay-per-view began with a singles match for the WWF Intercontinental Championship with champion Chris Jericho facing Kurt Angle, the reigning European Champion. Both Angle and Jericho wrestled inconclusively in the beginning, including an attempt by Jericho to force Angle to submit by applying the Walls of Jericho, but Angle grabbed the ropes surrounding the ring, which forced Jericho to break the hold. While referee Tim White was attending to Chyna, who collided with Angle into the ring steps, Jericho attempted to hit Angle with a Lionsault, but was hit in the face with the Intercontinental Championship belt. Angle then covered Jericho for the pinfall, winning the Intercontinental Championship to become a double champion. Following the match, referees White and Hebner argued over the conclusion.

The following bout was a tag team match for the WWF Tag Team Championship, where the champions, the New Age Outlaws (the Road Dogg and Billy Gunn), defended their titles against the Dudley Boyz (Bubba Ray Dudley and D-Von Dudley). Throughout the match, both teams performed many offensive maneuvers, though The Dudley Boyz were able to gain the upper hand when Bubba Ray struck Billy Gunn with a lead pipe on the outside of the ring and did the 3D on Road Dogg inside the ring. Bubba Ray then covered Road Dogg to win the WWF Tag Team Championship for his team.

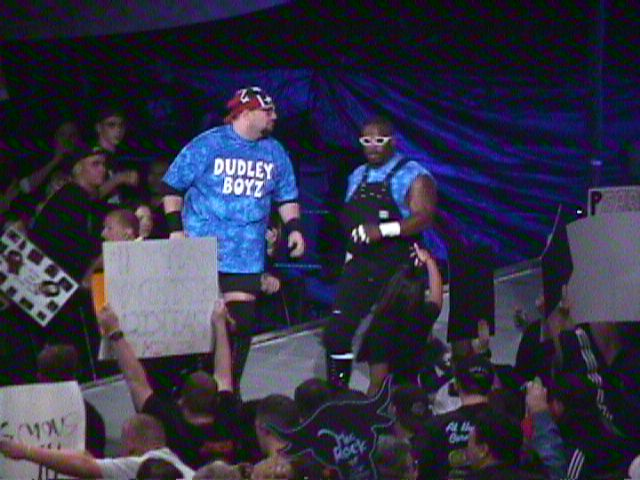
The Dudley Boyz faced the New Age Outlaws for the WWF Tag Team Championship

The third contest was Viscera versus Mark Henry in a standard match. Henry started the match and managed to bring Viscera down, but then Viscera retaliated with a spinning heel kick and got the advantage. Viscera crashed Henry against the ladders on the outside and performed a Samoan drop and belly to belly suplex, until Mae Young interfered on behalf of Henry. Viscera pulled her down to the mat and tried to splash her, but Henry countered with a spear and scoop powerslammed him. He then pinned Viscera for the win.

The next match was a tag team match where Edge and Christian faced the Hardy Boyz (Matt Hardy and Jeff Hardy), who were escorted by Terri Runnels. Prior to the match, Terri had hired the Acolytes Protection Agency (Bradshaw and Faarooq) as protection, and they were at ringside throughout the match. Both teams attempted to gain the advantage throughout the contest, and Edge and Christian ultimately gained it when Terri turned on the Hardy Boyz, pushing Jeff off the top rope as he attempted his finisher called the Swanton Bomb. As Matt questioned her, Terri slapped him and Christian struck Matt from behind and pinned him for the win. Following his loss, the Hardy Boyz attempted to pull Terri into the ring, but the APA attacked them.

The fifth contest was a standard match between Tazz and The Big Boss Man. Soon after the match began, Tazz applied the Tazzmission to Boss Man in an attempt to make him submit, but Prince Albert interfered and attacked Tazz, causing a disqualification. As Tazz was the one attacked, the victory was given to him. Following the match, Prince Albert and Boss Man assaulted Tazz in the ring.

Other on-screen personnel
Role:	Name:
English commentators	Jim Ross
English commentators	Jerry Lawler
Spanish commentators	Carlos Cabrera
Spanish commentators	Hugo Savinovich
Interviewers	Michael Cole
Interviewers	Lilian Garcia
Ring announcer	Howard Finkel
Referees	Earl Hebner
Referees	Tim White
Referees	Jim Korderas
Referees	Jack Doan
Referees	Chad Patton

=== Main event matches ===
The next match was X-Pac, escorted by Tori, versus Kane, escorted by Paul Bearer, in a No Holds Barred match. X-Pac and Kane wrestled extensively on the entrance ramp including X-Pac throwing Kane into a steel cage, and Paul Bearer interfered often, attacking X-Pac. X-Pac gave Kane an X-Factor but he recovered. Kane then chokeslammed X-Pac followed by a tombstone piledriver to Tori. The match ended when X-Pac dropkicked the steel ring steps into Kane's face and covered him for a pin.

The seventh match on the card was a six man tag team match where Too Cool (Rikishi, Scotty 2 Hotty, and Grand Master Sexay) faced The Radicalz (Chris Benoit, Dean Malenko, and Perry Saturn). Both teams performed many offensive maneuvers throughout the match, but Too Cool gained the upper hand when Rikishi delivered a Banzai Drop to Malenko. This was followed by a cover for the pin.

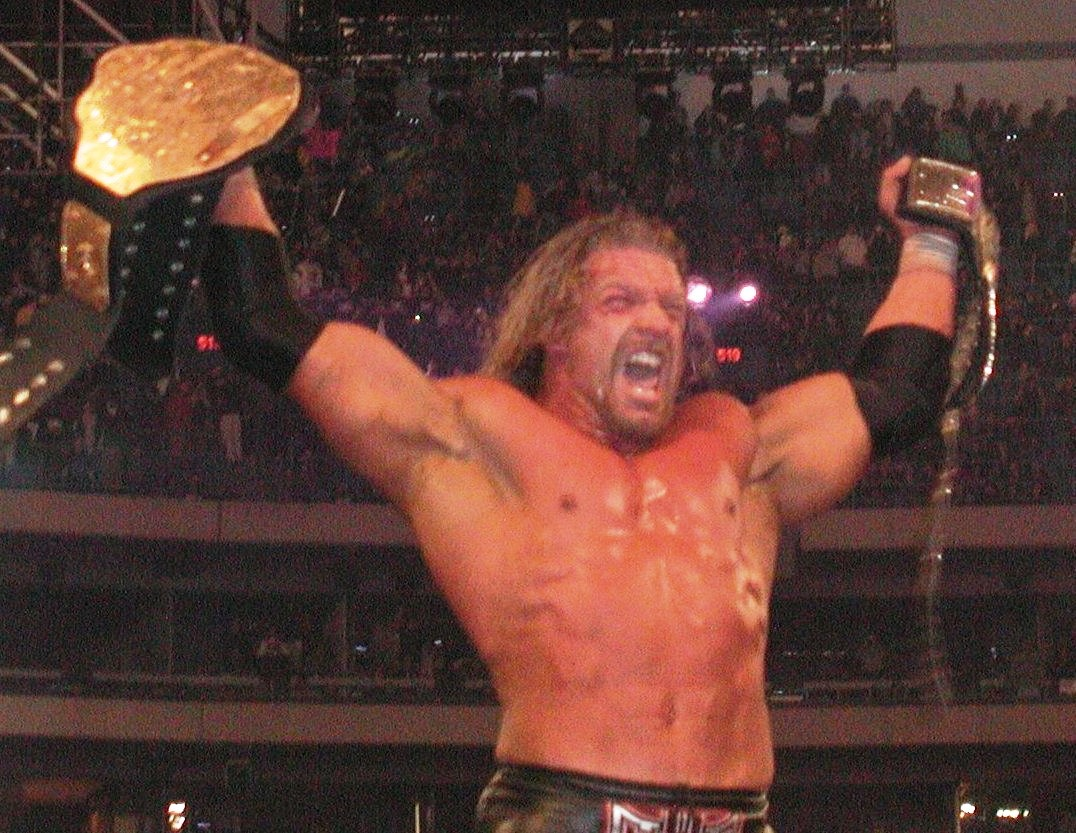
Triple H, who defended his title against Cactus Jack in a Hell in a Cell match.

The featured bout on the undercard was The Big Show versus The Rock for a championship match at WrestleMania 2000. During the match, referee Tim White was knocked out, and upon recovering he was involved in a fight with fellow referee Earl Hebner, causing referee White to not count the pin when the Big Show covered the Rock, while Shane McMahon came down to ringside. The Rock then delivered the Rock Bottom, one of his finishing maneuvers, and was attempting to perform the People's Elbow on his fallen opponent, when McMahon hit the Rock with a steel chair. The Big Show then covered the Rock and got a pin.

The main event was a Hell in a Cell match for the WWF Championship, in which WWF Champion Triple H defended his championship against Cactus Jack, with the added stipulation that if Jack lost he would have to retire from professional wrestling. The match began inside a structure of metal surrounding the ring and ringside area. Throughout the match, many weapons were employed, such as steel chairs and a 2x4 with barbed wire wrapped around it (the 2x4 was also set on fire later in the match). When the ring steps were repeatedly thrown against the wall of the cell, it tore open and Cactus Jack jumped through it to the outside of the cage. The men fought first on the announcers' table with Jack piledriving Triple H on it, and later both men wrestled on the top of the cage. While on top of the cell, Cactus Jack attempted a Piledriver, but the move was reversed and Triple H backdropped him onto the cell roof. The move broke the cell roof and Cactus Jack fell through to the mat below, buckling the surface of the ring. After Jack stood up again, Triple H performed the Pedigree on him. He then covered Cactus Jack for a successful pin to win the match.

== Aftermath ==
Although Big Show was now the top contender with his victory, the controversial circumstances with which he achieved it once again cast a pall over the WrestleMania championship match. On March 13, he and The Rock squared off again, with Rock agreeing to put his career on the line against the title match. Shane McMahon was made the guest referee and went out of his way to again ensure Big Show's victory, but a returning Vince McMahon foiled his plans and enabled Rock to score the victory. Three days later, Shane reinserted Big Show into the title match by declaring it a Triple Threat Match. Vince responded by saying he would be in The Rock's corner for the match. The Triple Threat instead occurred on Raw on March 20, 2000; after Triple H won, Linda McMahon came out and informed him, as well as Rock and Big Show, that they would still face each other at WrestleMania but would now be involved in a four-way elimination match with a returning Mick Foley, whom she would accompany to the ring. Triple H would retain the WWF Championship after Vince betrayed The Rock by attacking him, and he and Shane both joined forces with the McMahon-Helmsley Era. The Rock would finally win the WWF Title against Triple H at Backlash with the help of Steve Austin.

According to a NBC News interview that year, The Undertaker, who had not been seen on television due to a groin injury he suffered in 1999, was originally supposed to return at No Way Out, however ten days before the event, he suffered another injury, this time, tearing his pectoral muscle while training for the event. Undertaker would finally make his return at Judgment Day.

Kurt Angle, by virtue of his win, became the first man to hold both the European and Intercontinental Championships simultaneously since Jeff Jarrett the previous year. He and Chris Jericho continued feuding after No Way Out, with Chris Benoit also joining in. A two-fall Triple Threat match was signed for WrestleMania 2000, with one fall contested for the European Championship and the other for the Intercontinental Championship. Angle lost both of his titles without factoring into either decision; Jericho defeated Benoit to win the European Championship while Benoit defeated Jericho to win the Intercontinental Championship. However, he would continue to find success as 2000 went on, eventually becoming that year's King of the Ring and later winning the WWF Championship before the year was out.

No Way Out 2000 established No Way Out as the annual February PPV until the 2009 event. In 2010, No Way Out was replaced by Elimination Chamber. One further No Way Out was held in 2012, except it was held in June instead of February and was replaced by Payback in 2013.

== Reception ==
In 2017, Kevin Pantoja of 411Mania gave the event a rating of 8.0 [Very Good], stating, "I enjoyed this Pay-Per-View. Outside of Viscera/Henry and Tazz/Bossman, everything was worth watching. Even the Show/Rock match had some Attitude Era fun in the shenanigans, making up for some dull work. The event has an emotional main event that delivered in a big way, which is the obvious thing that sticks out. However, Angle/Jericho and Angle’s antics throughout the night were entertaining. There are also two often forgotten tags here (Hardys/E&C and Radicalz/Too Cool) that were both very good matches. Kane/X-Pac was fine and the Dudleys mostly squashing the Outlaws to signal a new era for the tag division was great."

== Results ==
No.	Results	Stipulations	Times
1	Kurt Angle defeated Chris Jericho (c) (with Chyna)	Singles match for the WWF Intercontinental Championship	10:15
2	The Dudley Boyz (Bubba Ray Dudley and D-Von Dudley) defeated The New Age Outlaws (Road Dogg and Billy Gunn) (c)	Tag team match for the WWF Tag Team Championship	5:20
3	Mark Henry (with Mae Young) defeated Viscera	Singles match	3:48
4	Edge and Christian defeated The Hardy Boyz (Matt Hardy and Jeff Hardy) (with Terri Runnels)	Tag team match to determine #1 contenders to the WWF Tag Team Championship	16:55
5	Tazz defeated Big Boss Man (with Prince Albert) by disqualification	Singles match	0:47
6	X-Pac (with Tori) defeated Kane (with Paul Bearer)	No Holds Barred match	7:46
7	Too Cool (Rikishi, Scotty 2 Hotty and Grand Master Sexay) defeated The Radicalz (Chris Benoit, Dean Malenko and Perry Saturn) (with Eddie Guerrero)	Six-man tag team match	12:38
8	Big Show defeated The Rock	Singles match to determine the #1 contender to the WWF Championship at WrestleMania 2000	8:55
9	Triple H (c) (with Stephanie McMahon-Helmsley) defeated Cactus Jack	Hell in a Cell Title vs. Career match for the WWF Championship (Note: Since Cactus Jack lost, he was forced to retire)	24:00
(c) / – the champion(s) heading into the match
