= WrestleMania 2000 =

World Wrestling Federation pay-per-view event

- Promotional poster featuring various WWF personnel
- Promotion: World Wrestling Federation
- Date: April 2, 2000
- City: Anaheim, California
- Venue: Arrowhead Pond of Anaheim
- Attendance: 19,776
- Buy rate: North America: 824,000
- Tagline: A McMahon in Every Corner

Pay-per-view chronology
← Previous; No Way Out	Next → Backlash

WrestleMania chronology
← Previous; XV	Next → X-Seven

WrestleMania 2000, also known as WrestleMania 16, was a professional wrestling pay-per-view (PPV) event produced by the World Wrestling Federation (WWF, now WWE). It was the 16th annual WrestleMania and took place on April 2, 2000, at the Arrowhead Pond of Anaheim in Anaheim, California. This was the second WrestleMania at this venue, after WrestleMania XII in 1996. A total of nine matches were contested on the event's card.

The main event was a four-way elimination match for the WWF Championship involving reigning champion Triple H, The Rock, Mick Foley, and The Big Show, which Triple H won after last eliminating The Rock, marking the first time a heel had won the main event of WrestleMania. Main matches on the undercard included a triangle ladder match for the WWF Tag Team Championship involving Edge and Christian, The Hardy Boyz, and The Dudley Boyz, and a two-fall triple threat match for both the WWF Intercontinental and European Championships involving Kurt Angle, Chris Jericho, and Chris Benoit.

This is only one of three WrestleManias that The Undertaker did not wrestle a match since his WrestleMania debut in 1991 until his retirement from professional wrestling in 2020 (the others being WrestleMania X & WrestleMania 35).

== Production ==
=== Background ===
WrestleMania is considered the World Wrestling Federation's (WWF, now WWE) flagship professional wrestling pay-per-view (PPV) event, having first been held in 1985. It has become the longest-running professional wrestling event in history, and is held annually between mid-March to mid-April. It was the first of the WWF's original four pay-per-views, which include Royal Rumble, SummerSlam, and Survivor Series, referred to as the "Big Four", and was considered one of the "Big Five" PPVs with the addition of King of the Ring in 1993. The 16th WrestleMania was titled WrestleMania 2000, due to it taking place in the year 2000. It was scheduled to be held on April 2, 2000, at the Arrowhead Pond of Anaheim in Anaheim, California, marking the second WrestleMania at this venue, after WrestleMania XII in 1996.

=== Storylines ===
The event included nine matches that each resulted from scripted storylines. Results were predetermined by writers of the World Wrestling Federation, while storylines were produced on WWF's weekly television shows, Raw is War, and SmackDown!, along with its supplementary programs, Sunday Night Heat, and Jakked/Metal.

==== WWF Championship ====
The main feud heading into WrestleMania was over the WWF Championship, and involved two feuds that had become intertwined over the previous two months, and eventually drew in the McMahon family.

On the January 3, 2000 edition of Raw, Triple H regained the WWF Championship, which he had previously lost to The Big Show at Survivor Series in November 1999 due to interference from Vince McMahon. He also used his position as husband to Stephanie McMahon-Helmsley to exert control over the company, and his rivals. This would lead to the firing of Mick Foley, his most vocal rival. Foley, however, was later reinstated, and reverted from his Mankind persona to his more violent Cactus Jack persona, challenging Triple H to a street fight at the Royal Rumble later that January, which the champion won.

Meanwhile, after Big Show's loss, he began showing signs of disdain toward The Rock in interviews. Shortly thereafter, he abandoned The Rock in several tag matches featuring the two, and eventually attacked him, turning heel, and declaring his intent to win the Royal Rumble match and regain the WWF Championship. Big Show, and The Rock both entered the Royal Rumble match, and were the last two men left in the ring, and The Rock apparently won the match after pulling himself back into the ring before Big Show tumbled to the floor. However, Big Show protested The Rock's victory, and insisted that he did not lose the match. Big Show then proceeded to produce video footage that showed The Rock had touched the floor with both feet before Big Show did.

Heading into No Way Out on February 27, a double main event was signed. Triple H would defend the WWF Championship against Cactus Jack in a Hell in a Cell match, with Cactus being forced to retire from wrestling should he lose. The winner of that match would face the winner of a match earlier in the night between The Rock, and Big Show, for the right to go to WrestleMania and face the champion.

During the #1 contender's match, The Rock had hit the Rock Bottom on Big Show and was about to deliver the People's Elbow when Shane McMahon, who had not been seen on WWF television since December 1999, came to the ring and laid The Rock out with a steel chair shot, enabling Big Show to get the pinfall victory and earn the title shot.

Later in the night, the bout between Triple H and Cactus Jack would spill outside of the cell and end up on the roof, where Cactus lit a 2x4 wrapped in barbed wire ablaze and attempted to deliver a piledriver to Triple H onto it. Triple H reversed it by backdropping Cactus, causing him to fall through a panel in the cell's ceiling and hit the ring with enough force to break the ring mat. Once back inside, the champion hit the Pedigree on the challenger to win the match, retain his title, and send Cactus Jack into retirement.

The night after No Way Out, Triple H informed The Rock that he had to start at the bottom of the pecking order since he was no longer the number one contender, and forced him into a match with The Brooklyn Brawler. The Rock easily won the match and proceeded to call Triple H out afterward. Stephanie would then decide to give The Rock a chance to be added into the WrestleMania main event, provided he could pin either Triple H or Big Show, who had formed a formidable, but uneasy, alliance in the previous weeks despite Big Show's challenger status to Triple H, in a handicap match in that night's main event. The Rock won the match, but did so after Shane interfered and broke up a pin attempt. Since this resulted in a disqualification victory for The Rock rather than a pinfall victory, he was not added to the WrestleMania match.

Two weeks later, The Rock challenged Big Show yet again and this time agreed to put his career on the line to get to WrestleMania. Shane would go on to appoint himself as the special guest referee, but during the match, Vince McMahon returned from his exile following Stephanie's betrayal of him at Armageddon the previous December. He knocked Shane out with a chair and counted the pin for The Rock, who won his way into the WrestleMania main event, officially making it a Triple Threat match.

The following week on Raw, Vince announced that the Triple Threat match between the three men would take place that night instead of waiting until WrestleMania. Triple H reluctantly agreed on the terms that the match not take place at WrestleMania under any circumstances. With Stephanie in his corner, Shane in Big Show's corner, and Vince in The Rock's corner, Triple H would emerge victorious and retain the championship after pinning Big Show with the Pedigree. After the match, however, Linda McMahon appeared and informed Triple H that he would indeed be defending the WWF Championship at WrestleMania against not only The Rock and Big Show, but a newly reinstated Mick Foley as well in a Fatal-4-Way Elimination Match. Foley then immediately came out and attacked Triple H. Linda would then announce on the March 24 edition of SmackDown! later that week that she would be in Foley's corner for the match and also announced that should Mick Foley end up winning the Fatal-4-Way, the WWF Championship would be vacated later that night at WrestleMania, and a tournament would begin to crown a new WWF Champion that would run until the next pay-per-view, Backlash.

==== Other storylines ====
Another major feud that had been developing going into the show featured Chris Jericho. At No Way Out in February, Jericho lost his Intercontinental Championship to then-European Champion Kurt Angle after Angle hit him with the title belt behind the referee's back, causing Angle to become a double champion. Over the following weeks, Jericho would make several attempts to regain the championship, with all attempts being unsuccessful, largely due to Angle's sudden partnership with WWF legend Bob Backlund, who had briefly returned to the company. While feuding with Angle, Jericho also started a rivalry with The Radicalz, as Chris Benoit was also trying to win the Intercontinental Championship, while Eddie Guerrero was subsequently trying to woo Jericho's valet Chyna. Eventually, a two-fall match between Angle, Benoit, and Jericho was signed for WrestleMania. The first fall would be contested for the Intercontinental Championship, and the second fall would be contested for the European Championship.

Another major feud heading into the event was between Edge and Christian, The Hardy Boyz (Matt Hardy and Jeff Hardy), and The Dudley Boyz (Bubba Ray Dudley and D-Von Dudley) for the WWF Tag Team Championship. On the January 17 edition of Raw, Jeff Hardy was scheduled to face Bubba Ray Dudley in a singles match. The match saw Jeff pinning Bubba Ray after delivering a Swanton Bomb. After the match, the Dudleys attacked the Hardys, in which they powerbombed Matt on top of a table. Later that week, on the January 20 edition of SmackDown!, Matt was placed in a singles match with D-Von Dudley. The win was given to Matt via disqualification, after Jeff and Bubba Ray made their way to the ring, causing both teams to begin brawling with one another. Bubba Ray prepared to powerbomb Matt off the stage, onto some tables that were set up by the Dudleys. Bubba Ray, however, was hit by Jeff with a chair, causing him to fall onto the tables below. The Hardys then set up a table of their own, and Matt proceeded to perform a legdrop on D-Von through the table. At the Royal Rumble, the Hardys defeated the Dudleys in a tag team tables match, with Jeff performing a Swanton Bomb onto D-Von from the arena's balcony. The following night on Raw, the Dudleys showed respect towards the Hardys, and stated they would help them defeat the New Age Outlaws later that night for the WWF Tag Team Championships. In return, the Hardys would have to grant the Dudleys a title shot at the titles. However, during the match, the Dudleys stopped the three count, after the Hardys had the match in their favor, which allowed the Outlaws to retain the titles. After the match, the Dudleys then proceeded to perform the 3-D on each of the Hardys. The Dudleys would go on to successfully defeat the Outlaws at No Way Out to win the Tag Team Championships. Later that night, Edge & Christian defeated the Hardy Boyz in a #1 Contender's match after Terri Runnels, who had been managing the Hardys, turned heel and cost them the match. Over the following weeks, the two teams would begin a feud in which they trash-talked each other in interviews, and cost each other matches. It was later announced that all three teams would face each other for the WWF Tag Team Championships at WrestleMania in a Triangle Ladder match.

Another storyline that was developing around this time revolved around the WWF Hardcore Championship. On the February 24 edition of SmackDown!, Crash Holly defeated Test for the Hardcore Championship with help from his cousin Hardcore Holly. After the match, Crash declared that he would defend the title any time, at any place, 24 hours a day, 7 days a week, so long as there was a referee present. This backfired on Crash, as he was ambushed and challenged in impromptu matches for the title in various places including a laundromat, a hotel room, an amusement park, and the baggage claim at Newark Liberty International Airport. Although Crash was able to retain his title or regain it after briefly losing it each time he was confronted, a battle royal featuring many of the wrestlers who had been ambushing Crash was signed for WrestleMania.

== Event ==
Other on-screen personnel
Role:	Name:
English commentators	Jim Ross
English commentators	Jerry Lawler
Spanish commentators	Carlos Cabrera
Spanish commentators	Hugo Savinovich
Interviewer	Michael Cole
Interviewer	Kevin Kelly
Ring announcer	Howard Finkel
Referees	Earl Hebner
Referees	Jack Doan
Referees	Jim Korderas
Referees	Theodore Long
Referees	Chad Patton
Referees	Mike Sparks
Referees	Tim White

=== Preliminary matches ===
Before the opening video, Lilian Garcia sang "The Star-Spangled Banner". The first match that aired was a tag team match between the team of The Godfather, and D'Lo Brown (who were accompanied to the ring by the Godfather's Ho Train, and rapper Ice-T, who also sang their entrance music; due to licensing issues, the team's entire entrance is edited out of the Peacock stream of the event) against the team of the Big Boss Man and Bull Buchanan. The Godfather, and Brown gained the early advantage over Buchanan, and Boss Man, as they were able to execute a leg drop, and a splash combination. Buchanan, and Boss Man, yet, retaliated after Boss Man delivered a Sidewalk slam, and Buchanan delivered a leg drop from the top turnbuckle into a pinfall, and winning the match.

The second match was a hardcore battle royal for the WWF Hardcore Championship featuring champion Crash Holly defending against The Mean Street Posse, The APA, Kaientai, The Headbangers, Tazz, Viscera, and Hardcore Holly. The rules of the match were as follows: The match would go on for fifteen minutes, the championship could exchange hands an unlimited number of times during the time limit, and the final wrestler with the Hardcore Championship would win the match, and remain the Hardcore Champion. The first championship exchange occurred after Tazz pinned Crash, which proceeded with Viscera pinning Tazz. The third championship exchange occurred after Funaki pinned Viscera, however, Funaki was then pinned by Rodney. The fifth championship exchange occurred after Joey Abs pinned Rodney, which proceeded with Abs being pinned by Thrasher. The seventh title exchange occurred after Pete Gas pinned Thrasher. Gas was then pinned by Tazz. The ninth title exchange occurred after Crash pinned Tazz, which proceeded with the final championship exchange, as Hardcore Holly pinned Crash in a controversial ending. Despite this, Hardcore Holly officially won the Hardcore Championship.

Edge and Christian vs. The Dudley Boyz vs. The Hardy Boyz for the Tag Team Championship

The next match was a tag team match between the team of Al Snow, and Steve Blackman against the team of T & A (Test and Albert). Back-and-forth action between the two teams towards the end of the match, where Albert delivered a Baldo Bomb on Snow, while Test delivered an elbow drop from the top rope onto Blackman into a pinfall for the win.

The fourth match was a WWF Tag Team Championship triangle ladder match involving The Hardy Boyz, Edge and Christian, and champions The Dudley Boyz. Edge, and Christian first gained the advantage after Edge climbed the top rope, and speared Jeff, who was climbing a ladder. Edge, and Christian were then given consecutive 3-D's by The Dudley Boyz. The Dudley Boyz then brought tables into the ring, and onto ringside, where D-Von unsuccessfully attempted to splash Jeff through a table in the ring, while Bubba powerbombed Matt through another table at ringside. The Hardy Boyz would then retaliate after Jeff delivered a Swanton bomb off a ladder onto Bubba, through a table. As Jeff did so, Matt climbed a ladder, along with Edge, and Christian, who pushed Matt off the ladder through a table. The situation allowed Edge, and Christian to reach, and grab the championship belts that were hung from the rafters, thus gaining their first Tag Team Championship.

The fifth match was a Catfight between The Kat, and Terri with special guest referee, Val Venis; the winner of the match was based on the rules of a battle royal in that the wrestler who threw her opponent out of the ring (does not have to be over the top rope, however) would be declared the winner. The Kat threw Terri out to the ringside; however, Venis was distracted by Mae Young, who was at ringside managing The Kat, and thus was unable to see the action. Terri was again thrown out to ringside by The Kat; however, once again, the action was not seen by Venis, as he was distracted by Young. In retaliation, The Fabulous Moolah, who was at ringside managing Terri, pulled The Kat out of the ring, which was seen by Venis, thus declaring Terri the winner the match. Whilst celebrating, Mae Young attacked Terri, and The Fabulous Moolah, before giving Moolah the bronco buster whilst Kat stripped Terri of her clothing.

Next was an Intergender tag team match between the team of Too Cool (Grand Master Sexay and Scotty 2 Hotty), and Chyna against the team of The Radicalz (Perry Saturn, Dean Malenko, and Eddie Guerrero). Both teams fought back, and forth towards the end of the match, where Chyna was tagged into the match, and delivered a press slam, powerbomb, and a sleeper slam to pin Guerrero for the win.

The seventh match was a two-fall triple threat match for both the WWF Intercontinental, and WWF European Championship, involving Kurt Angle, Chris Benoit, and Chris Jericho. The first fall would be for the Intercontinental Championship, while the second fall was for the European Championship. At the beginning of the first fall, all three men exchanged pin attempts leading into midway into the match, where Benoit broke up a Chicken wing submission by Angle onto Jericho. The situation allowed Benoit to climb to the top turnbuckle, and delivered a Diving headbutt on Jericho into a pinfall to win the Intercontinental Championship. During the second fall, Jericho delivered a double powerbomb onto Angle, which proceeded into Benoit delivering three German suplexes onto Jericho. Afterwards, Benoit attempted to deliver another diving headbutt onto Angle, however, Angle moved out of the way, resulting in Benoit hitting the ring mat. This situation allowed Jericho to deliver a Lionsault into a pinfall to win the European Championship. Therefore, Kurt Angle lost both titles without conceding to a single pinfall.

The final match on the undercard was the tag team encounter between Kane, and Rikishi against D-Generation X (X-Pac and Road Dogg).Shortly into the match, Rikishi delivered a Stink Face to Road Dogg, and attempted to give a Stink Face to Tori, and DX attempted to leave the arena, but were stopped by Kane, and Rikishi. The Match ended with Kane delivering a Tombstone piledriver to win by pinfall. Afterward, an in-ring dancing segment involving Rikishi, Too Cool, and the San Diego Chicken was interrupted by Kane, who thought the chicken was Pete Rose, who had tried to attack Kane the previous year. Rose then snuck into the ring, and tried to hit Kane with a baseball bat, before being chokeslammed by Kane, and getting a Stink Face from Rikishi.

=== Main event match ===
The main event was a WWF Championship four-way elimination match involving The Big Show (with Shane McMahon), Mick Foley (with Linda McMahon), The Rock (with Vince McMahon), and the defending champion, Triple H (with Stephanie McMahon). In the beginning of the match, Big Show press slammed Triple H, and Rock; however, all three competitors then attacked Big Show. This situation allowed The Rock to eliminate Big Show, after delivering a Rock Bottom into a pinfall. After the elimination, Foley delivered a double arm DDT on Triple H. However, Triple H retaliated, performing a Pedigree on Foley onto a steel chair; this resulted in a pinfall, and Foley's elimination. After Foley was eliminated, he returned to the ring, and attacked Triple H with a barbed wire 2x4. The Rock and Triple H would proceed to brawl in and out of the ring with neither superstar gaining the advantage over the other. Vince attacked Triple H, which led to Shane returning to the ringside, where he attacked his father, assaulting him with a steel chair which had led to Vince bleeding from the forehead. Shane, who was preparing to execute a chair shot on The Rock, failed when Vince returned and threw Shane out of the ring. Vince had then picked up the steel chair and was preparing to attack Triple H with it, but in a shocking and unexpected swerve, Vince instead hit The Rock with the steel chair, thus turning heel. After a second chair shot towards The Rock by Vince, with the former being able to kick out of Triple H's first attempted pinfall towards him, Triple H had pinned The Rock for a second time and was able to get a successful pinfall against him, thus retaining the championship. After the match, The Rock, who was badly bruised and being helped out of the ring and towards the backstage by official referees, angrily returned to the ring and proceeded to execute Rock Bottoms on Vince, Shane, and Stephanie McMahon, before executing a People's Elbow on Stephanie to close the show.

== Reception ==
19,776 fans at the Arrowhead Pond for WrestleMania 2000

WrestleMania 2000 was met with a mixed critical response. John Powell of Canadian Online Explorer's professional wrestling section called the event "a flop", and opined that "It was supposed to be sports entertainment's greatest event of the year. It was supposed to be the best the WWF had to offer. It wasn't. ... WrestleMania 2000 from The Pond in Anaheim, California, will go down as one of the worst WrestleManias the World Wrestling Federation has produced in its 15-year history of broadcasting the flagship spectacle. ... The only one-on-one match being the ludicrous Catfight between Terri, and The Kat, the other congested WrestleMania bouts suffered from constant stalling of one form or another as wrestlers lay prone for extended periods or engaged in low-impact brawling on the outside of the ring so that the audience could direct their attention to the other participants. This approach left many WWF superstars looking foolish for selling holds longer than they needed to. ... Ironically, the first-ever All-Day-Long pre-show recapping the history of WrestleMania for eight hours before the premiere wrestling event was better than the card itself." He gave the overall event a score of 3 out of 10 stars, which is a considerably lower score than the previous year's event, which received a rating of 5 out of 10 stars. The main event between Triple H, Mick Foley, The Big Show, and The Rock for the WWF Championship was rated 4 out of 10 stars, and both the Two-fall Triple Threat Match for the WWF Intercontinental, and European Championships between Kurt Angle, Chris Jericho, and Chris Benoit, and the Triangle Ladder match for the WWF Tag Team Championship between The Dudley Boyz, The Hardy Boyz, and Edge, and Christian both received the highest rating of 8 out of 10 stars, and The Cat Fight between Terri, and The Kat received the lowest rating of 0 out of 10 stars.

In 2009, Rob McNew of 411Mania gave the event a rating of 5.0 [Not So Good], stating, "This show was so disappointing, because the WWF for most every show in 2000 could do no wrong, but they managed to screw up the biggest show of the year by making the main event an after thought in the McMahon family drama. There were some high points on this card, and the main event was very solid action-wise, questionable booking aside. There is still no explanation for what happened at the end. You can't even blame Russo because he was already in WCW running them into the ground."

== Aftermath ==
After the event, The Rock continued to feud with Triple H over the WWF Championship. The feud continued on the first Raw after WrestleMania, where The Rock pinned Triple H in a non-title match. The following week on Raw, the feud intensified, where The Rock defeated the Big Boss Man, and Bull Buchanan in a handicap steel cage match. After the match, Triple H, Shane, and Vince McMahon attacked The Rock, which caused him to lose a great amount of blood. Later that week on SmackDown!, it was announced that The Rock would face Triple H for the WWF Championship at Backlash. At Backlash, The Rock, with help from Stone Cold Steve Austin, and Linda McMahon, defeated Triple H to win the WWF Championship.

Also the next night on Raw, Eddie Guerrero defeated Chris Jericho to win the European Championship with help from Chyna, who turned on Jericho, and aligned herself with Guerrero.

Crash Holly won the Hardcore Championship from cousin Hardcore Holly the next night on Raw.

=== Video ban in Ireland ===
The Irish Film Classification Office (IFCO) banned the video release of the event, owing to its use of realistic weapons, including metal chairs, timber wrapped with barbed wire, shinai, and sledgehammers. Deputy censor Audrey Conlon also cited the "gladiatorial bloodlust" of the crowd baying for increasingly extreme violence. Clear Vision Ltd., which released material from the WWF under its Silver Vision imprint, lodged an appeal (the result of which is unknown), and claimed that "our fans love the wild soap opera element", but the IFCO countered this by stating, "This is one of the most dangerous, and pernicious aspects of the entire business. The universal distinguishing feature of all soap operas is that the storylines are regularly made more explicit, and, in many instances, more violent, simply to keep audience share."

== Results ==
No.	Results	Stipulations	Times
1	Big Boss Man and Bull Buchanan defeated The Godfather and D'Lo Brown (with Ice-T and the Ho Train)	Tag team match	9:08
2	Hardcore Holly won by last defeating Crash Holly (c) (Note: The other participants were: Bradshaw, Faarooq, Funaki, Joey Abs, Mosh, Pete Gas, Rodney, Taka Michinoku, Tazz, Thrasher and Viscera.)	Hardcore battle royal for the WWF Hardcore Championship	15:00
3	T & A (Test and Albert) (with Trish Stratus) defeated Head Cheese (Al Snow and Steve Blackman) (with Chester McCheeserton)	Tag team match	7:04
4	Edge and Christian defeated The Dudley Boyz (Bubba Ray Dudley and D-Von Dudley) (c) and The Hardy Boyz (Matt Hardy and Jeff Hardy)	Triangle ladder match for the WWF Tag Team Championship	23:30
5	Terri Runnels (with The Fabulous Moolah) defeated The Kat (with Mae Young)	Catfight with Val Venis as special guest referee	2:24
6	Chyna and Too Cool (Grand Master Sexay and Scotty 2 Hotty) defeated The Radicalz (Perry Saturn, Dean Malenko and Eddie Guerrero)	Six-person intergender tag team match	9:38
7	First Fall (Intercontinental title): Chris Benoit defeated Chris Jericho (pinned) and Kurt Angle (c); Second Fall (European title): Chris Jericho defeated Chris Benoit (pinned) and Kurt Angle (c)	Two-fall Triple threat match for the WWF Intercontinental and WWF European Championships	13:48
8	Kane and Rikishi (with Paul Bearer) defeated D-Generation X (X-Pac and Road Dogg) (with Tori)	Tag team match	4:00
9	Triple H (c) (with Stephanie McMahon-Helmsley) defeated The Rock (with Mr. McMahon), Mick Foley (with Linda McMahon) and Big Show (with Shane McMahon)	Fatal 4-Way elimination match for the WWF Championship	38:00
(c) / – the champion(s) heading into the match

Hardcore Championship battle royal title changes
Number	New Champion	Method	Time
1	Tazz	Pinned Crash Holly after a Capture Suplex	00:26
2	Viscera	Pinned Tazz after a Powerslam	01:00
3	Funaki	Pinned Viscera after a flying shoulder block by Bradshaw	07:51
4	Rodney	Pinned Funaki after throwing him into a backstage wall	08:11
5	Joey Abs	Pinned Rodney after a Gutwrench Suplex	08:24
6	Thrasher	Pinned Joey Abs after a clothesline	08:46
7	Pete Gas	Pinned Thrasher after hitting him with a fire extinguisher	09:29
8	Tazz	Pinned Pete Gas after a T-Bone Suplex	10:17
9	Crash Holly	Pinned Tazz after hitting him with a cookie sheet	14:20
10	Hardcore Holly	Pinned Crash Holly after hitting him with a candy jar	15:00

Fatal four-way match eliminations
Elimination no.	Wrestler	Eliminated by	Elimination move	Time
1	Big Show	The Rock	Pinned after a Rock Bottom	04:50
2	Mick Foley	Triple H	Pinned after a Pedigree onto a steel chair	19:40
3	The Rock	Triple H	Pinned after two Chair shots to the head by Mr. McMahon	38:00
