= Edge & Christian =

Professional wrestling tag team

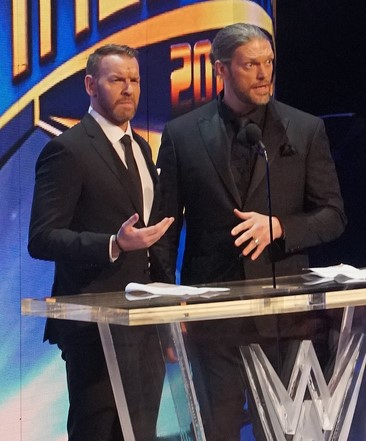
- Christian (left) and Copeland (right, then known as Edge) in April 2018

Tag team
- Name(s): Adam Copeland and Christian Cage; Cage and Cope; Edge and Christian; High Impact; Suicide Blondes; Revolution X Canadian Rockers; Hard Istian; E&C; Team E&C / Team EC; Los Conquistadores; The Brood; Team ECK; Rocket Strappers
- Members: Adam Copeland/Edge; Christian/Christian Cage
- Billed heights: 6 ft 5 in (1.96 m) – Edge; 6 ft 1 in (1.85 m) – Christian (Cage)
- Combined billed weight: 453 lb (205 kg)
- Hometown: Toronto, Ontario, Canada
- Billed from: Toronto, Ontario, Canada
- Debut: 1995
- Years active: 1995–2001; 2002; 2005; 2010–2011; 2025–present
- Trained by: Ron Hutchison

Adam Copeland and Christian Cage, also known as Cage and Cope, are a Canadian professional wrestling tag team. They are signed to All Elite Wrestling (AEW). They are best known for their time in the World Wrestling Federation (WWF), later renamed World Wrestling Entertainment (WWE), as Edge & Christian (E&C) (Edge being Copeland's WWE ring name, and the other being Cage's), where they won the WWF Tag Team Championship on seven occasions.

Initially, the two were portrayed as on-screen brothers, but this aspect was de-emphasized in the mid-2000s, and in 2010, the team was officially retconned as legitimate childhood friends. The team disbanded in 2001 but reunited briefly under the SmackDown brand in 2011. Edge, however, announced his retirement from professional wrestling due to neck injury on the April 11 episode of Monday Night Raw, which would ultimately end their final run in WWE together. Edge made his in-ring return in 2020, followed by Christian in 2021, as the two were both entrants in the 2021 Royal Rumble. Shortly after, Christian left WWE for AEW using the ring name Christian Cage, and Edge would then join AEW in 2023 under his real name Adam Copeland, also truncated as Cope. The duo reunited in AEW in August 2025.

In addition to their seven reigns as WWF Tag Team Champions, they each won singles titles during their run as a tag team. Edge and Christian are also noteworthy for their participation in the first three Tables, Ladders, and Chairs matches (TLC matches), and the use of steel folding chairs as weapons. They developed a move called the "con-chair-to", a play on words of "concerto" where both Edge and Christian each hit a wrestler simultaneously with a chair, often in the head, or they lay a motionless wrestler's head on a chair, and then hit them in the head with another chair. They are considered one of the major teams that revived tag team wrestling during the Attitude Era. In 2012, WWE named them the greatest tag team in WWE history. The team's popularity propelled Edge & Christian to main event success, with both men becoming multiple-time singles world champions in their own right.

== History ==
=== Early years (1995–1998) ===
Adam Copeland and Jason Reso formed a tag team in the Canadian independent circuit after completing their training with Ron Hutchison and Sweet Daddy Siki at Hutchinson's "Sully's Gym". The pair primarily used the ring names of Sexton Hardcastle & Christian Cage, respectively. Their tag team wrestled under several team names, such as "High Impact", "Suicide Blondes", "Revolution X", "Hard Impact" and "Canadian Rockers". They were part of a faction dubbed "Thug LiFe" in 1997. The stable consisted of Cage, Hardcastle, Joe E. Legend, Rhino Richards, Bloody Bill Skullion, Big Daddy Adams, and Martin Kane. In 1998, Sexton and Cage began teaming up in independent promotions such as Insane Championship Wrestling (ICW) and Southern States Wrestling (SSW).

The duo won the ICW Streetfight Tag Team Championship twice and SSW Tag Team Championship once during their time in the independent circuit.

=== World Wrestling Federation/Entertainment (1998–2001; 2009–2011) ===
==== The Brood and Terri Invitational Tournament (1998–2000) ====
On the June 22, 1998 episode of Raw is War, Copeland debuted as Edge in the World Wrestling Federation (WWF) against Jose Estrada Jr. He was a mysterious "loner" character, who would emerge from the crowd before his matches. Eventually, he started a feud with Gangrel. At In Your House: Breakdown on September 27, during a match pitting Edge against Owen Hart, Reso, cited as an unknown person looking strikingly similar to Edge, came out to the ring distracting him long enough to allow Hart to get the win. It was later revealed that Reso's character was Christian, Edge's storyline brother, and that he was aligned with Gangrel as his vampire follower. After some confrontations between the two gothic brothers, Edge was eventually convinced to "come home" with Christian and Gangrel, and the three of them formed a stable known as "The Brood".

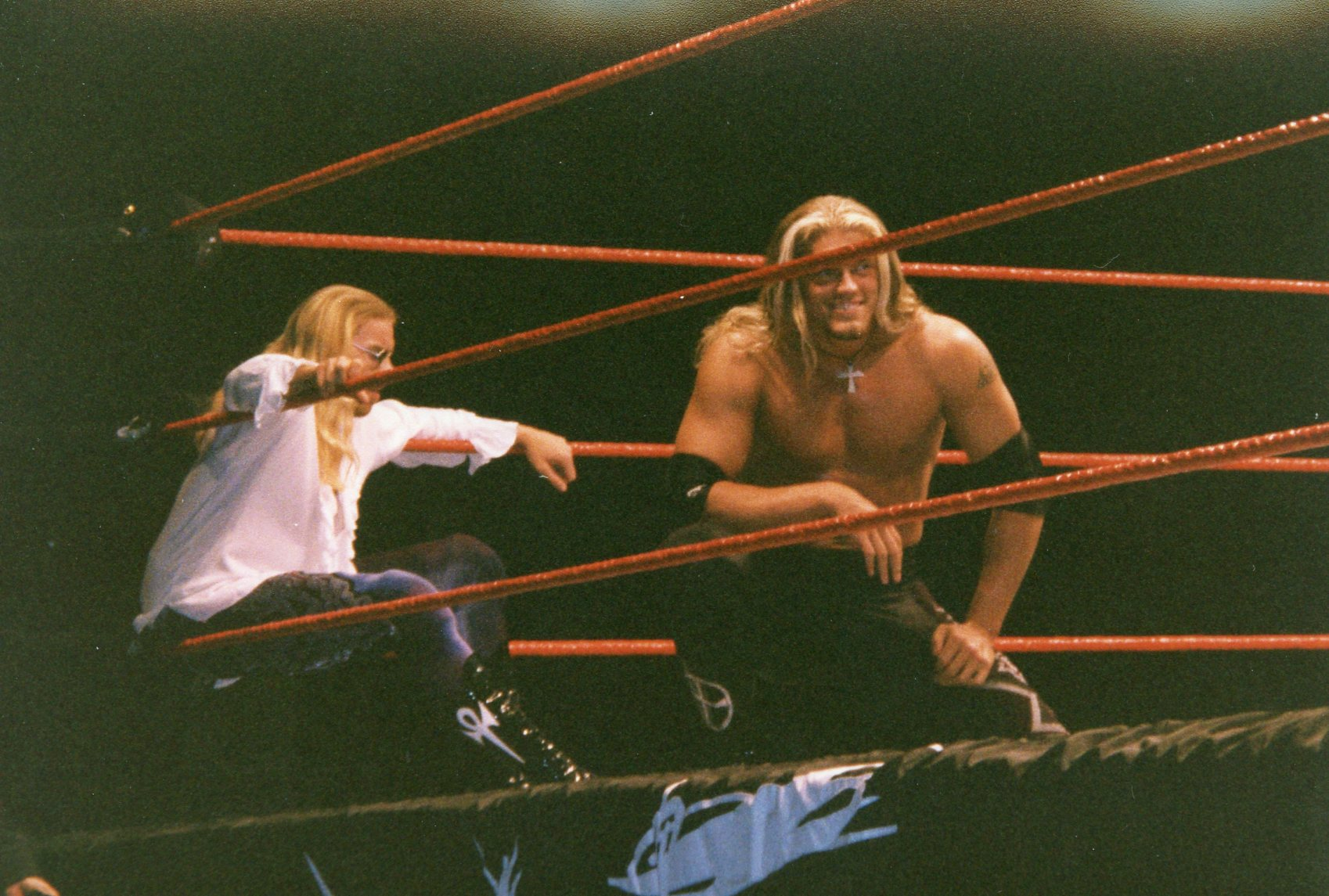
Christian (left) & Edge during their time in The Brood

At In Your House: Rock Bottom on December 13, the Brood defeated The J.O.B. Squad (Al Snow, Bob Holly, & Scorpio). The Brood then briefly joined The Undertaker's Ministry of Darkness faction, but left after Christian was flogged and almost sacrificed for revealing Stephanie McMahon's whereabouts to Ken Shamrock. Following a short feud with the Ministry in the immediate aftermath, Gangrel turned on Edge and demanded that Christian do the same. He refused and both Christian and Edge broke away from Gangrel, turning them into fan favorites. From there, the gothic storyline enjoyed limited success, beginning their eventual tag team feud with The Hardy Boyz (Matt Hardy & Jeff Hardy), who also briefly formed a new Brood with Gangrel before turning on him as well. At this point, the duo had rehashed Edge's pre-Brood gimmick as borderline gothic fan favorites, most notable for a tendency to enter the ring through the audience.

The tag team feud with the Hardy Boyz intensified as Gangrel became Matt and Jeff's new manager, combining to form "The New Brood", in the summer of 1999. However, both teams were more interested in acquiring the managerial services of Terri Runnels, for which (along with $100,000) they would compete in a best-of-five series of matches known as the "Terri Invitational Tournament". Edge & Christian won the first two matches, putting the Hardyz in sudden jeopardy. The Hardyz went on to win the next two matches, however, leading to a rubber match at No Mercy on October 17 to determine which team would earn Terri's services. The rubber match would be a ladder match, in which Gangrel tried to interfere, only to get ejected. Matt and Jeff Hardy went on to win the match and the tournament after a competitive bout that resulted in both teams receiving a standing ovation from the audience after the match, as well as the next night on Raw Is War. On that next night, the four men shook hands in a show of respect, then all turned against Gangrel by attacking him when he came out to boast about spending the night with Terri, establishing them all as heroic figures and removing Gangrel from the equation entirely.

The storyline then focused around the "mutual respect" between Edge & Christian and the Hardy Boyz, along with both teams' pursuit of the WWF Tag Team Championship. The two teams were involved in several matches together, such as at Survivor Series on November 14 and No Way Out on February 27, 2000. However, shortly after Terri betrayed the Hardyz at No Way Out, the truce between the two teams imploded and they began fighting each other once more. Terri then attempted to sow discord between Edge & Christian in a storyline that was originally intended to see the two split off into singles wrestlers with Terri managing Christian, but plans was quickly changed to keep the tag team together and have them reject Terri's plans.

==== Comedic antics and championship pursuits (2000) ====
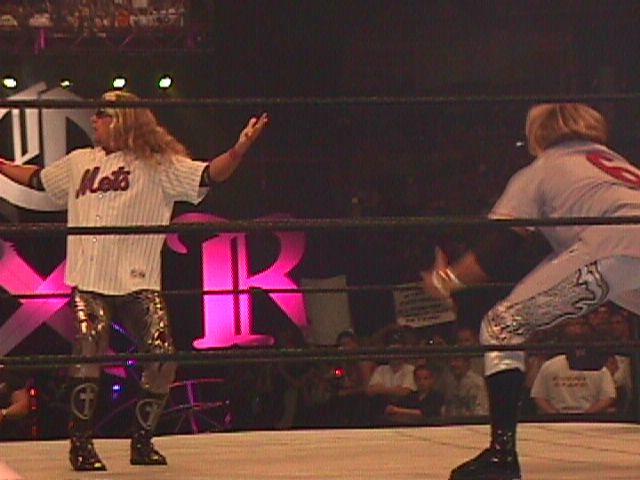
Edge (left) & Christian preceded matches with a five-second pose for flash photography where they would often mock their opponents or the location of the event

Edge & Christian continued their "mutual respect" storyline with the Hardy Boyz, with the respect between the two teams steadily deteriorating into a more aggressive rivalry leading up to WrestleMania 2000 on April 2. At WrestleMania, Edge & Christian defeated the defending champions The Dudley Boyz (Bubba Ray Dudley & D-Von Dudley) and the Hardy Boyz in a Triangle ladder match to win their first WWF Tag Team Championship. Immediately thereafter, Edge & Christian began redefining themselves as a villainous duo of comedic, arrogant, surfer-styled teen idols. No longer entering the arena through the crowd, the two engaged in various antics, including making fun of their opponents and/or the city they were performing in, using strange exclusive phrases (the most notable being "reek of awesomeness"), and dressing in outlandish costumes. Other trademarks of theirs included the "five-second pose" where, "for the benefit of those with flash photography", they would pose in odd positions in the middle of the ring so fans could take pictures. These poses usually involved making fun of either their opponents or aspects of town pride (for instance, making fun of Elvis Presley during a show in Memphis, Tennessee or imitating Bill Buckner in the 1986 World Series at the King of the Ring event in Boston) in order to generate a negative reaction from the crowd.

At Backlash on April 30, the duo successfully retained their titles against D-Generation X (X-Pac and Road Dogg). They then began a feud with Too Cool (Scotty 2 Hotty, Grand Master Sexay, and Rikishi). On the May 29, 2000 edition of Raw Is War, they dropped the titles to Scotty & Sexay. At the King of the Ring pay-per-view on June 25, the duo defeated Too Cool, Hardy Boyz, and T & A (Test and Albert) in a Four Corners elimination match to win their second WWF Tag Team Championship.

Matching the Dudleyz' penchant for driving enemies through tables and the Hardyz' proficiency in diving attacks using ladders, Edge & Christian became known for using the "con-chair-to", an attack consisting of simultaneous steel chair shots on both sides of a victim's head. At SummerSlam on August 27, they defended their titles successfully against the Dudleyz and Hardyz in the first-ever Tables, Ladders and Chairs match (TLC match), a specialized ladder match themed around the signature weapons of all three teams. Edge & Christian stated that instead of doing the "time-honored tradition" of shaking the hands of their opponents, they would instead do the time-honored tradition of mocking their opponents, and had four little people show up dressed as the Hardy Boyz and the Dudley Boyz, with toy ladders and tables, along with a special "37-second pose" where the fake Hardyz and Dudleyz bowed to Edge & Christian, who stood on the table.

==== Los Conquistadores (2000) ====
After Edge & Christian lost the tag team championship to the Hardy Boyz at Unforgiven on September 24 in a Steel Cage match, they were granted a rematch the very next night on Raw Is War in a ladder match, which they lost. According to the pre-match stipulation, due to the loss, they could never again challenge for the tag team championship as long as the Hardy Boyz held them. Thus, as a loophole, they began competing under the masks of Los Conquistadores. On the October 16 edition of Raw Is War, they defeated the Dudley Boyz, and on the October 19 edition of SmackDown!, they won a tag team battle royal to earn themselves a tag team title shot. They went on to defeat the Hardy Boyz at No Mercy on October 22 to once again become the tag team champions.

Soon after, another team began competing as Los Conquistadores as well, and they soon challenged Edge & Christian for their tag team championship on the October 23 episode of Raw Is War. "Los Conquistadores" defeated Edge & Christian before ripping off their masks and revealing themselves as the Hardy Boyz, therefore the Hardyz were champions once again.

==== Team RECK (2000–2001) ====
During the course of 2000, Edge & Christian began to periodically team with Kurt Angle, forming "Team ECK", a group that was later joined by Rhyno when he came in from Extreme Championship Wrestling (ECW) in early 2001, christening the foursome as "Team RECK".

At Armageddon on December 10, Edge & Christian competed in a Four Corners match which included the then-current champions, Right To Censor (The Goodfather and Bull Buchanan), the Dudley Boyz and the makeshift team of Road Dogg and K-Kwik. Edge & Christian went on to win the match and their fourth WWF Tag Team Championship. A week later, they lost the WWF Tag Team Championship to The Rock and The Undertaker on the December 18 episode of Raw, but eventually regained them on the December 21 episode of SmackDown!.

At the Royal Rumble on January 21, 2001, they lost the titles to the Dudley Boyz. They aided the Hardy Boyz in defeating the Dudley Boyz for the titles on March 5 edition of Raw Is War and then two weeks later, they defeated the Hardy Boyz themselves for their record breaking sixth WWF Tag Team Championship. Later that night, they dropped the titles to the Dudley Boyz, making them the shortest reigning WWF Tag Team Champions of all time. At WrestleMania X-Seven on April 1, they defeated the then-champions the Dudley Boyz and the Hardy Boyz in the second-ever TLC match to win their seventh and final WWF Tag Team Championship, with help from their teammate Rhyno. On the April 19 episode of SmackDown!, they lost the WWF Tag Team Championship to The Brothers of Destruction (Undertaker and Kane).

==== Split, brief reunions, and individual success (2001–2006) ====
Friction soon began to arise between the duo (as well as the entire RECK faction) at King of the Ring, when Edge won the 2001 King of the Ring tournament (all four members had made it to the semi-finals). As a result, on the September 3 edition of Raw Is War in their hometown of Toronto, Christian appeared to be jealous of Edge and insisted on carrying Edge's King of the Ring trophy to the ring. After Edge had defeated Lance Storm, Christian assaulted Edge with a "one-man con-chair-to" turning into a major heel and joining The Alliance. The former partners went on to feud over the WWF Intercontinental Championship for several months, causing the team to ultimately split.

Edge and Christian had a one-night reunion at a SmackDown! live event on October 13, 2002 when they defeated Los Guerreros (Eddie and Chavo). They reunited again on November 15, 2004 edition of Raw, losing to Chris Benoit and Shelton Benjamin. From there, they would become loosely united through Christian facing Edge's storyline rivals, leading to three more reunion tag team matches in 2005, where the two were also supported by Christian's enforcer at the time, Tyson Tomko. The two also competed in the first-ever Money in the Bank ladder match at WrestleMania 21 during this time, which Edge won.

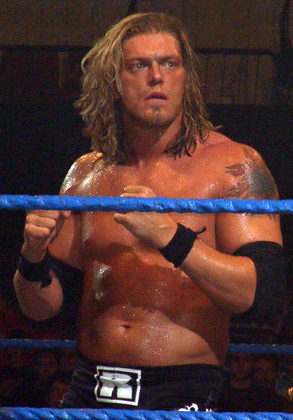
Edge in June 2008

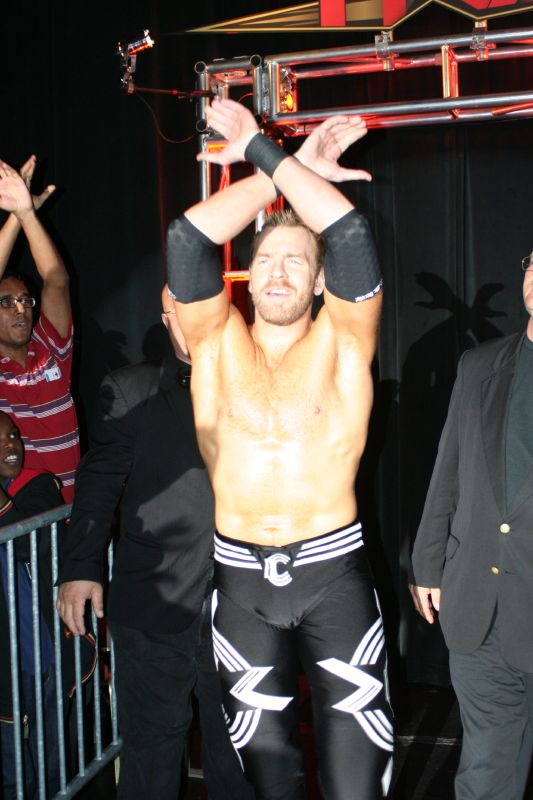
Christian in September 2008

Christian left WWE in November 2005. He debuted in Total Nonstop Action Wrestling (TNA) at its Genesis pay-per-view soon thereafter under the ring name Christian Cage, which he used in Canadian independent circuit. Christian experienced immediate success in TNA, where he won the NWA World Heavyweight Championship twice. Edge also achieved greater success in WWE after Christian's departure. He went on to cash in his Money in the Bank contract at New Year's Revolution in January 2006 and won the WWE Championship, his first of eleven world championship reigns.

==== Reunion and Edge's retirement (2009–2012) ====
In 2009, Christian returned to WWE, and at Backlash, won the ECW Championship, his first world championship in WWE. Following his title win, and before Edge's ninth world title win that same night, the duo interacted on television for the first time since Christian's return. On the first SmackDown following the 2010 WWE Draft, Christian and Edge came face-to-face following Edge's goodbye speech, in which they referred to themselves simply as childhood friends rather than brothers, permanently retconning their previous backstory. Christian would force Edge to reveal that he had manipulated the fans into believing he was now a fan favorite, and challenging Edge to a match. Edge refused the challenge, admitted that Christian was right and that he had manipulated the fans, which led to a brawl between the two, which saw Christian get the upper hand. On the May 17 edition of Raw, in their hometown of Toronto, Edge was scheduled for a "Pick Your Poison" match and his opponent turned out to be Christian. Edge eventually won the match with a spear, however, moments later Randy Orton revealed that The Undertaker was in fact his real opponent. Though Edge got himself intentionally counted out, Christian got the last laugh by throwing Edge back into the ring to get chokeslammed by the Undertaker.

The duo reunited once again at the 2010 Slammy Awards. During the first months of 2011, Christian assisted Edge during his feud with Alberto Del Rio. At WrestleMania XXVII, Edge defeated Del Rio to retain the World Heavyweight Championship. On the April 11, 2011 edition of Raw, Edge officially announced his retirement from professional wrestling due to complications from his previous neck injuries, vacating the World Heavyweight Championship in the process. Upon his retirement, Christian would gain a championship match for the vacated World Heavyweight Championship against Del Rio after winning a 20-Man Battle Royal. At Extreme Rules, after a distraction by Edge reversed the effects of interference from Clay, Christian defeated Del Rio in a Ladder match for the vacated title. Edge and Christian celebrated the win and embraced in the ring one final time.

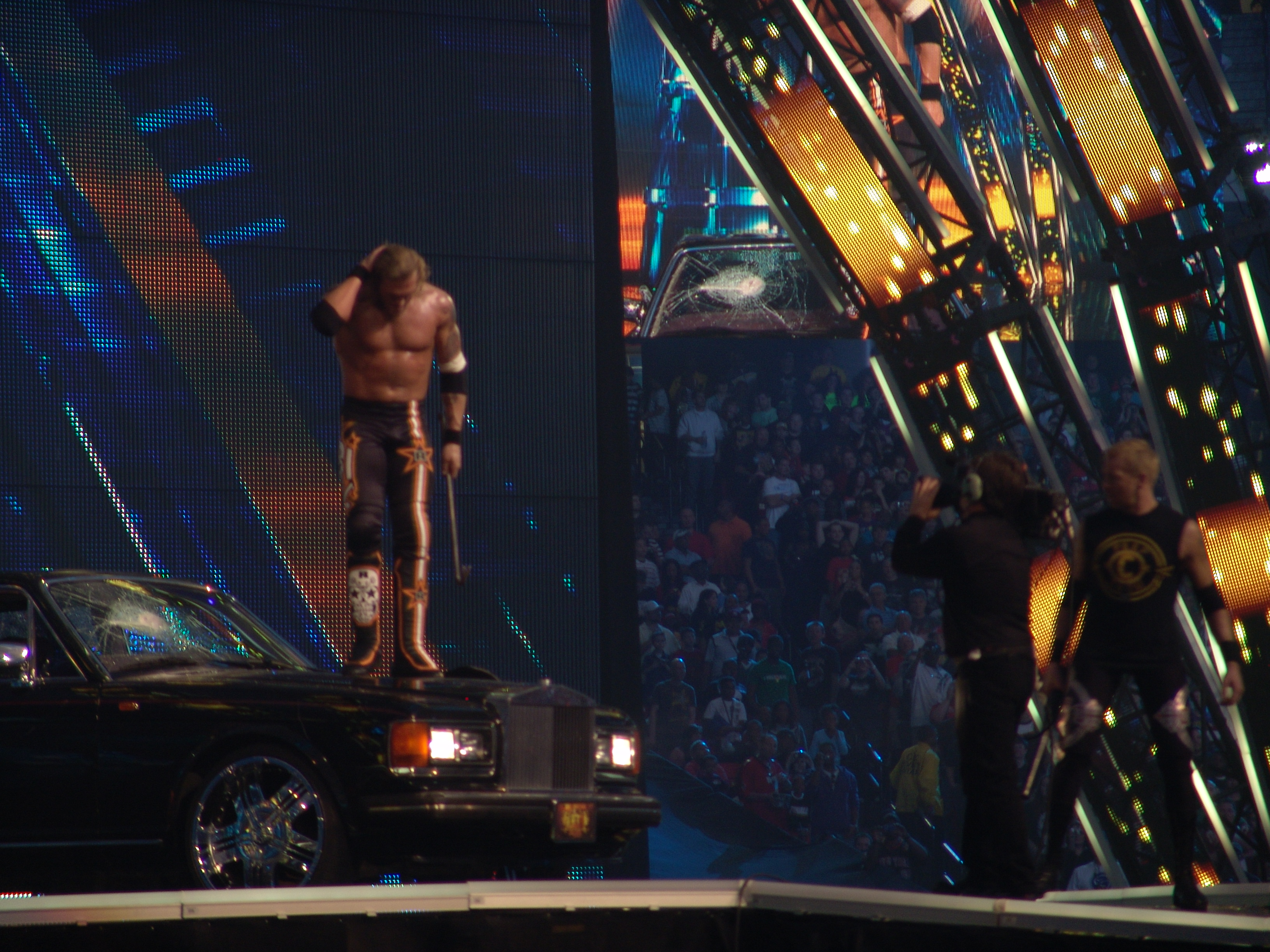
Edge destroying Alberto Del Rio's car, as Christian watches, at WrestleMania XXVII

At SummerSlam, Christian revealed that Edge would be at ringside for his World Heavyweight Championship No Holds Barred match against Randy Orton. However, Edge berated Christian for his recent actions (Christian, at this point, had once again turned heel) and left him to fight on his own in a losing effort to Orton. On the September 16, 2011 edition of SmackDown, entitled "Edge Appreciation Night", the duo once again came face-to-face backstage. They made up, but argued again after Christian tried asking Edge to get him another title shot. After the tapings, a tribute for Edge aired and the two did a five-second pose in front of their hometown of Toronto. In January 2012, it was announced that Edge would be inducted into the WWE Hall of Fame. On March 31, 2012, Christian inducted Edge into the WWE Hall of Fame. At the end of Edge's speech, he did a five-second pose to end the ceremony.

==== Last reunions (2014–2021) ====
Edge & Christian guest hosted the December 29, 2014 episode of Raw. During the show, Christian was attacked and forced out of the ring by Seth Rollins, Big Show, and J&J Security. Edge was held to the mat by Big Show while Rollins threatened to break his neck with the Curb Stomp if John Cena did not bring back The Authority. Ultimately, Cena would give in to Rollins' demands, saving Edge, but bringing back The Authority. Edge & Christian appeared on the Stone Cold Podcast on the WWE Network following the September 7, 2015 episode of Raw.

Outside of WWE, the two have appeared together on the Syfy television series Haven, on which Copeland had a strong recurring role as Dwight Hendrickson, and Reso made guest appearances as McHugh, a close friend and ally of Dwight's. They also co-hosted The Edge & Christian Show That Totally Reeks of Awesomeness on the WWE Network. Their new show debuted on February 21, 2016, immediately following Fastlane. To promote the show, Edge & Christian hosted The Cutting Edge Peep Show at Fastlane featuring The New Day as their guests. A second season of the show was then announced and began in November 2018. In addition, they started their own podcast called E&C's Pod of Awesomeness in April 2017. The show would eventually end in February 2019.

In 2018, Edge & Christian inducted The Dudley Boyz (Bubba Ray Dudley and D-Von Dudley) into the WWE Hall of Fame.

After nine years and two neck fusion surgeries, Edge made his in-ring return at the 2020 Royal Rumble, making it to the final three in the men's Royal Rumble match. He then reignited a feud with Randy Orton, which also saw involvement from Christian, as after Orton defeated Edge in a match at Backlash in June, which resulted in Edge suffering a legitimately torn triceps, Christian tried to take up for Edge, resulting in a quick unsanctioned match on Raw that Orton won.

At the 2021 Royal Rumble, Edge made his return from the torn triceps injury and entered the match at number one. Christian later entered the match at number 24 as a surprise entrant, marking his first official match since 2014, and he and Edge once again reunited. Christian was ultimately eliminated by Seth Rollins, but Edge then eliminated Rollins, and then Orton, to win the 2021 men's Royal Rumble match. In March, Christian left WWE for All Elite Wrestling (AEW), thus separating the team once again.

=== All Elite Wrestling (2025–present) ===
While Christian signed with All Elite Wrestling in 2021 as Christian Cage, Edge left WWE and went to AEW in 2023, using his real name Adam Copeland. At the post-event media scrum, Copeland confirmed that he has signed a contract with AEW and would be appearing in a regular, full-time capacity for the promotion. The two would feud over the AEW TNT Championship in late 2023 and early 2024 with Copeland coming out on top.

At All In: Texas on July 12, 2025 Cage's stable The Patriarchy turned on him; he was saved by Copeland, who then told him to go find himself. They had their first tag team match together in 14 years at Forbidden Door, where they defeated Killswitch and Kip Sabian. At All Out on September 20, they defeated FTR in a tag-team match.

After a six-month absence due to Copeland filming season 3 of Percy Jackson and the Olympians, the duo returned at Revolution on March 15, 2026, where they attacked FTR (who had just retained their AEW World Tag Team Championship) and stared down The Young Bucks (Matt Jackson and Nick Jackson). On April 12 at Dynasty, Cage and Copeland unsuccessfully challenged FTR for the tag titles. At Double or Nothing on May 24, Copeland and Cage defeated FTR in an "I Quit" match to win the tag titles. The duo would go on to successfully defend their titles at Forbidden Door on June 28 against The Dogs (David Finlay and Clark Connors), at Redemption on July 26 against the Death Riders (Claudio Castagnoli and Pac), and at All In on August 30 against The Young Bucks, only to lose them to the Young Bucks in a three-way ladder match also involving FTR at All Out ending their reign at 125 days. After All Out, it was revealed that Cage had suffered three broken ribs and a collapsed lung in the ladder match, leaving him out of action for an undisclosed amount of time and putting the team on hiatus. It was also announced that Copeland would be retiring in 2027.

== Championships and accomplishments ==
- All Elite Wrestling
  - AEW World Tag Team Championship (1 time)
- Canadian Pro-Wrestling Hall of Fame
  - Class of 2021
- Insane Championship Wrestling (Milwaukee)
  - ICW Streetfight Tag Team Championship (1 time)
- Pro Wrestling Illustrated
  - Match of the Year (2000) vs. The Dudley Boyz and The Hardy Boyz in a triangle ladder match at WrestleMania 2000
  - Match of the Year (2001) vs. The Dudley Boyz and The Hardy Boyz in a Tables, Ladders and Chairs match at WrestleMania X-Seven
- World Wrestling Federation/World Wrestling Entertainment/WWE
  - World Heavyweight Championship (1 time) – Edge
  - WWF Intercontinental Championship (3 times) – Edge (2) and Christian (1)
  - WWF Light Heavyweight Championship (1 time) – Christian
  - WWF Tag Team Championship (7 times)
  - King of the Ring (2001) – Edge
- Wrestling Observer Newsletter
  - Tag Team of the Year (2000)
