= Terri Runnels =

American professional wrestler and manager (born 1966)

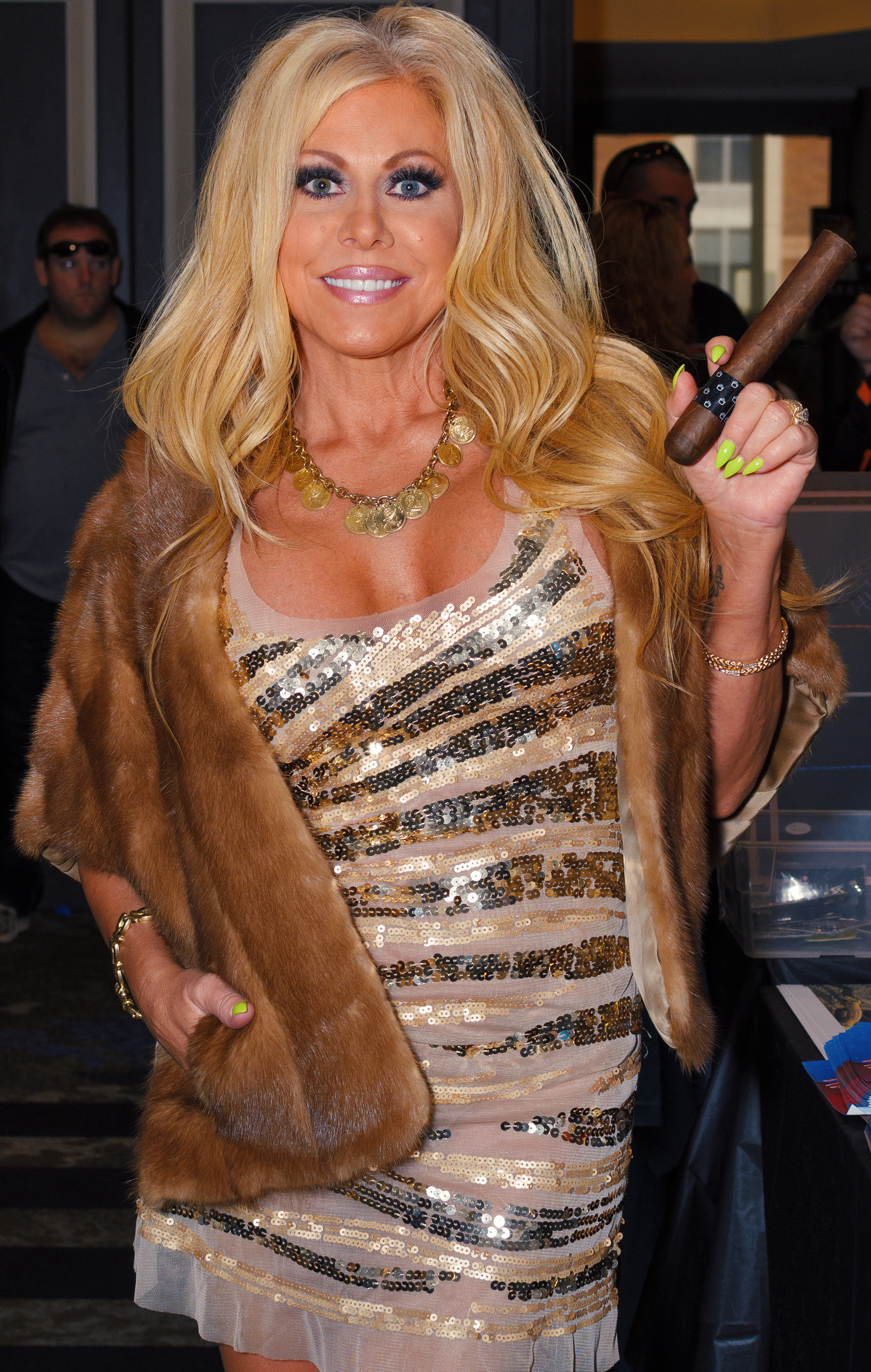
- Runnels dressed as "Marlena" in 2017

Personal information
- Born: Terri Lynne Boatright; October 5, 1966 (age 60) Live Oak, Florida, U.S.
- Spouses: Dustin Rhodes (m. 1993; div. 1999) David Essel (m. 2001; div. 2002)
- Children: 1

Professional wrestling career
- Ring name(s): Alexandra York; Marlena; Terri Runnels; Terri
- Billed height: 5 ft 0 in (152 cm)
- Billed weight: 125 lb (57 kg)
- Billed from: Gainesville, Florida
- Debut: January 2, 1990
- Retired: April 1, 2004

Terri Lynne Boatright Runnels (born October 5, 1966) is an American retired professional wrestling manager, television host, and occasional professional wrestler. Runnels began her professional wrestling career in World Championship Wrestling (WCW) as Ms. Alexandra York, manager of the York Foundation. She later joined the World Wrestling Federation (WWF), later renamed World Wrestling Entertainment (WWE), where she worked for two years as Marlena, and then under her real name.

In the early years of her career with the WWF, she managed her (then) real-life husband Dustin Runnels (known on-screen as Goldust) and was a member of the Pretty Mean Sisters alliance. She also managed both Hardy Boyz and Edge & Christian following the Terri Invitational Tournament in 1999. Subsequently, she had an on-screen rivalry with The Kat, managed The Radicalz stable, and worked as a host and interviewer. During her time with the World Wrestling Federation (or WWE), she briefly held the Hardcore Championship, her only championship during her career. After leaving the wrestling business, Runnels became involved in philanthropic work.

== Professional wrestling career ==
=== World Championship Wrestling (1988–1991) ===
Runnels was originally a make-up artist for CNN from 1985 to 1991, where she worked on Larry King's make-up. On the weekends, she did makeup for the wrestlers of Jim Crockett Promotions (JCP). When the company was purchased by Ted Turner in 1988 and renamed World Championship Wrestling (WCW), she moved to Atlanta and continued doing make-up for some of the wrestlers. Booker Ole Anderson asked her to become part of the roster as a manager and Runnels debuted in 1990 as Alexandra York, a laptop-carrying accountant who led an alliance known as the York Foundation, a group of wrestlers with finance-themed gimmicks. The York character was created over a lunch with Tony Schiavone, one of WCW's announcers. She worked at WCW for two years.

=== World Wrestling Federation / World Wrestling Entertainment (1996–2004) ===
==== Marlena gimmick and managing Goldust (1996–1998) ====
Runnels debuted in the World Wrestling Federation at the Royal Rumble in 1996 as Marlena, a character modeled after Marlene Dietrich. She debuted as a coolly unconcerned and indifferent television director-like manager, often sitting at ringside in her director's chair. With her cigar-smoking, seductive, nonchalant and mysterious gimmick, she acted as the manager of her (then) real-life husband Dustin, who was wrestling under the gimmick of Goldust. Complementing Goldust, the Marlena character too was representative of all things gold (sporting gold dresses, seated in a gold director's chair, carrying a gold purse sometimes consisting of actual gold dust used to throw in the eyes of Goldust's opponents). Often, Marlena took to lasciviously making out with Goldust when she wasn't coaching and encouraging him to do the same with his fellow opponents. The cigar-smoking aspect of the character came about because Runnels enjoyed smoking them in real life. The risque characters helped bring about The Attitude Era of the late-1990s and the Diva division. During a feud between Goldust and Triple H over the Intercontinental Championship, on February 16, 1997, at In Your House 13: Final Four, Marlena was choked by Chyna, who debuted as a plant from a ringside seat and later became the bodyguard for Triple H. Later, Brian Pillman feuded with Goldust over Marlena. As part of the angle, Pillman won Marlena in a match and sent Goldust a picture of her handcuffed in a bed. Pillman, however, died in the middle of the storyline. Originally, the plan was to have the rivalry culminate in an on-air wedding where Marlena would leave Goldust for Pillman. After the Marlena-Goldust alliance dissolved, Goldust revealed Luna Vachon as his new manager.

==== Pretty Mean Sisters (1998–1999) ====
Runnels later re-emerged in 1998, under her real name, as the on-screen girlfriend of Val Venis. When Runnels claimed to be pregnant with Venis' baby, he dumped her. She later joined forces with Jacqueline Moore, who had just ended her alliance with Marc Mero, to form the Pretty Mean Sisters (P.M.S.). They later formed an alliance with D'Lo Brown and Mark Henry, accompanying them to the ring for a match against Venis and The Godfather in December at Rock Bottom: In Your House. In January, Runnels claimed to have suffered a miscarriage after she was knocked off the ring apron by Brown. Weeks later, Brown discovered that Runnels had never been pregnant. P.M.S. gained a "love slave" named Meat in May, whom Runnels controlled using sex. As a part of the storyline, P.M.S. used Meat for his body, forcing him to have sex with them. The alliance, however, broke up by July, when Jacqueline Moore became frustrated with Runnels' infatuation with Meat.

==== Various storylines (1999–2001) ====
In late 1999, Runnels arranged the Terri Invitational Tournament, a best-of-five series, between Edge and Christian and The Hardy Boyz, with the winner receiving her managerial services and the sum of $100,000. The Hardy Boyz won the tournament, which culminated in a ladder match at No Mercy (with the prize money suspended above the ring in a bag). Runnels spent the next few months as their manager, notably getting involved in a Steel Cage match between Jeff Hardy and Al Snow on an episode of RAW. She continued interfering in matches until she was injured when Bubba Ray Dudley powerbombed her through a table. She returned on February 27 at No Way Out and cost the Hardy Boyz a match. She then became the manager of Edge and Christian, and the storyline originally called for her to come between the duo, resulting in them becoming singles wrestlers with Runnels managing Christian. The storyline, however, was rewritten, and on an episode of SmackDown!, Edge and Christian—who would now continue wrestling as a tag team—revealed they no longer wanted Runnels' services. She, therefore, slapped Edge, who responded by spearing her.

Runnels began a rivalry with The Kat, and at WrestleMania 2000, Runnels (accompanied by The Fabulous Moolah) defeated The Kat (with Mae Young) in a catfight. Val Venis was the Special Guest Referee, but was distracted when Young kissed him in response to Venis making out with both Runnels and The Kat. This distraction allowed Moolah to pull The Kat out of the ring, and when Venis saw her out of the ring, he declared Runnels the winner. Post-match, The Kat attacked Runnels by stripping her black body suit off to expose her nude colored thong. The rivalry continued in an arm wrestling match at Insurrextion. They later participated in a "Stink Face match" at SummerSlam, which The Kat won by first performing the move on Runnels.

On June 8, 2000, she competed in the first ever women's battle royal to determine the #1 contender to the WWF Women's Championship, but was eliminated by Lita. Runnels subsequently became the onscreen girlfriend and manager of Perry Saturn, who was a member of The Radicalz alliance. She accompanied Saturn to the ring at Fully Loaded in July 2000, where Saturn defeated Eddie Guerrero for the European Championship. Saturn, Runnels, and Radicalz member Dean Malenko also had a series of matches with Team Xtreme (The Hardy Boyz and Lita). The on-screen partnership lasted until Saturn, who had hit his head during a match, opted to continue seeing "Moppy" (a mop he believed was alive) instead of Runnels. As a result, she then became the manager of Raven, a member of The Alliance, who stole Saturn's mop and fed it into a woodchipper.

==== WWE host and departure (2001–2004) ====
In late 2001, Terri replaced Trish Stratus as the host of the WWF recap program Excess. She briefly feuded with Stratus, resulting in a wet T-shirt contest between the two on Raw. During this time, she also became the backstage interviewer on Raw and began to wrestle occasionally against the likes of Molly Holly, Victoria and Stratus. She also became the subject of Kane's affections and they regularly flirted during backstage segments. On May 27, 2002, she briefly held the perpetually contested Hardcore Championship when she pinned Steven Richards, though he immediately pinned her to regain the title. On the August 19 episode of RAW, Eric Bischoff placed her a battle royal featuring former Hardcore champions such as Tommy Dreamer, Bradshaw and Jeff Hardy. She eliminated herself immediately when the match began. On the September 2 edition of RAW she defeated Stacy Keibler in a "Lingerie pillow fight", but was hit with a clock by Keibler and humiliated after the match, thus igniting a brief feud between the two. Her final match was a losing effort alongside the returning Lita against divas Molly Holly and Gail Kim on the November 10 edition of Raw.

After eight years with the company, in March 2004, Runnels was released from WWE prior to a massive firing spree. In an April 2015 interview with Vince Russo, Runnels stated that she was flown up on April 1, 2004, to the WWE offices for a meeting with WWE executives Kevin Dunn and John Laurinaitis where she was told that they were parting ways with her; the reason she was told that she was flown up was because the WWE respected her.

=== Return to WWE (2018) ===
On January 22, 2018, in the Raw 25 Years special episode, Runnels was honored as part of a segment involving women considered legends that contributed to the company's success, including Maryse, Kelly Kelly, Lilian Garcia, Michelle McCool, Maria Kanellis and the Hall of Famers Torrie Wilson, the Bella Twins, Jacqueline and Trish Stratus.

In 2021, Runnels was listed by WWE.com as one of the women who made an impact outside the ring.

== Other Media ==
During her tenure in the WWF, Runnels appeared on the show The Weakest Link in 2002 as part of a charity show where all the contestants were WWF personalities. On the show, she played for the Ronald McDonald House charity, which houses parents of hospitalized children for reduced or no cost. Runnels was the fourth contestant voted out of the game.

=== Video Games ===
Year	Title	Role	Notes
1999	WWF WrestleMania 2000 (video game)	Terri	
2000	WWF No Mercy (video game)	Terri	
2003	WWE Raw 2	Terri	

=== Video Releases ===
Year	Title	Role	Notes
1996	Terminators '96	Marlena	
1997	Best of Raw 3	Marlena	
1997	Best of Raw 4	Marlena	
1997	Best of Raw 6	Marlena	
1997	Best of Raw 7	Marlena	
1998	Best of Raw 8	Marlena	
2000	Divas: Postcard from the Caribbean	Terri	
2000	Most Memorable Matches of 1999	Terri	
2001	Divas in Hedonism	Terri	
2013	WWE: Raw 20th Anniversary Collection	Marlena	

=== Television ===
Year	Title	Role	Notes
1991	WCW Worldwide	Alexandra York	1 Episode
1991	WCW Saturday Night	Alexandra York	2 Episodes
1996	Wrestlemania XII	Marlena	TV Special
1996 - 1997	WWF Superstars	Marlena	4 Episodes
1996 - 2018	WWE Raw	Terri / Marlena / Terri Runnels / Self	206 Episodes
1997	WWF on MSG Network	Marlena	1 Episode
1997	WWF Shotgun Saturday Night	Marlena	4 Episodes
1997	WWF Friday Night's Main Event	Marlena	1 Episode
1998 - 2003	WWE Sunday Night Heat	Terri / Terri Runnels	70 Episodes
1999	WrestleMania XV	Terri	TV Special
1999 - 2001	WWE Smackdown!	Terri	62 Episodes
2000	Freedom	Sandi Mueller	1 Episode
2000 - 2001	WWE Jakked	Terri	12 Episodes
2001	WWE Metal	Terri	1 Episode
2002	Summerslam	Terri	TV Special

== Personal life ==
Boatright grew up in Florida. She grew up as a Southern Baptist, but later became non-denominational. Runnels has worked with various charities, including the Make-a-Wish Foundation, Big Brothers Big Sisters of America, Boys & Girls Clubs of America, Children's Miracle Network, and Hermie & Elliott Sadler Foundation and Fit Kids Marathon.

She dated Brian Pillman in 1990 while they were both in WCW. In 1993, she married Dustin Runnels, whom she met while they were both working for WCW, taking his last name as her own. They have a daughter, Dakota, who was born in 1994. Dustin Runnels's strained relationship with his father Dusty Rhodes caused problems in their marriage, and Terri alleges that Dusty spread rumors about her that included infidelity and gold-digging. The couple divorced in 1999 after six years of marriage. Years after the divorce, they were able to have a "better relationship". In 2003, she began a relationship with Tyree Clowe, a US soldier 15 years her junior. The couple remained together for over five years.

Terri began dating former professional wrestler New Jack in 2009. Jack professed his love for her in an interview with host Fat Man After Dark on the Future Endeavors wrestling radio show and described some of the pitfalls, even today, of a mixed-race relationship. As of July 2011, the couple was no longer together.

In August 2011, a Florida judge ordered Jack to stop selling nude and bloody photographs of Runnels. Runnels filed suit, accusing Jack of making libelous comments about her and requested that a court ban him from distributing sexually-explicit photographs of her. Jack said that he took the photos, that they belonged to him and that he should be free to pass them on to whoever he pleases. A judge in Sanford, Florida, temporarily banned Jack from distributing photographs of Runnels ahead of a hearing.

On May 29, 2019, Runnels was arrested in Hillsborough County, Florida, and charged with felony possession of a firearm after bringing a loaded gun into the Tampa International Airport. She was later released on $2,000 bond and posted a video to her Twitter page, explaining her side of the incident. In June 2019, the charges against Runnels were dropped.

== Championships and accomplishments ==
- World Wrestling Federation / World Wrestling Entertainment
  - WWE Hardcore Championship (1 time)
  - Slammy Award (1 time)
    - Best Couple (1997) – with Goldust
