= Too Cool =

Professional wrestling tag team

Too Cool & Rikishi
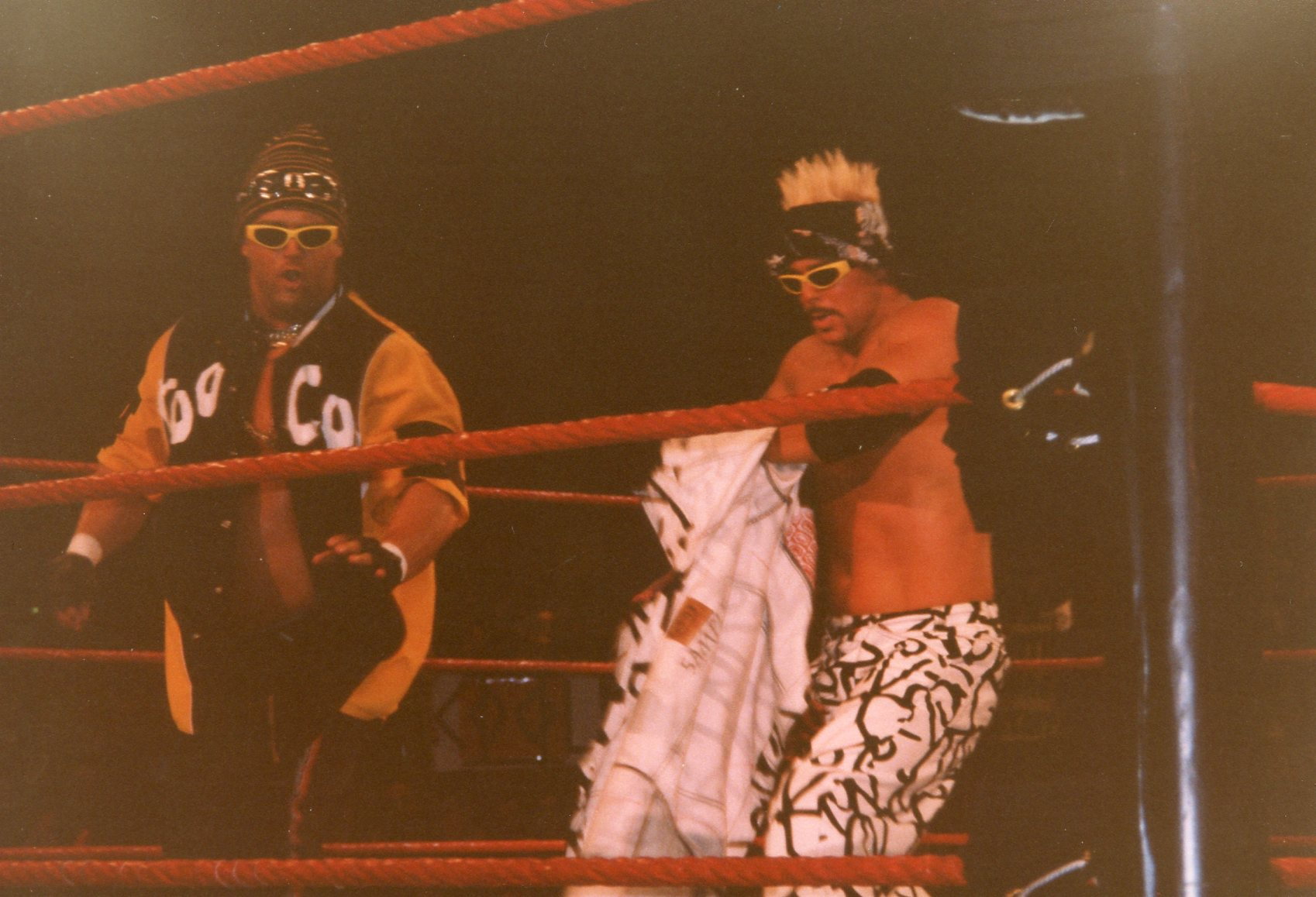
- Grand Master Sexay (left) and Scotty 2 Hotty in London, England

Stable
- Members: Scott Taylor / Scotty 2 Hotty; Brian Christopher / Grand Master Sexay; Rikishi
- Name(s): Too Cool; Too Much
- Debut: March 1998
- Years active: 1998–2001; 2003-2004; 2007; 2009; 2012; 2014–2016

Too Cool & Rikishi, originally known as Too Much, was an American professional wrestling tag team and group active in the World Wrestling Federation (later World Wrestling Entertainment) between 1998 and 2001 and for a short time in 2004 and 2014. The group originally contained members Grand Master Sexay and Scotty 2 Hotty, who were later joined by Rikishi.

== History ==
=== World Wrestling Federation / Entertainment (1998–2001, 2003–2004, 2014) ===
==== 1998–1999 ====
The duo of "Too Sexy" Brian Christopher and "Too Hot" Scott Taylor were originally a tag team known as Too Much. They sported the gimmick of two vain wrestlers with homoerotic interactions. They made their first appearance as a team at WrestleMania XIV in a tag battle royal won by L.O.D. 2000. The team feuded with fellow light heavyweight wrestlers such as Taka Michinoku and aided Jerry "The King" Lawler (Christopher's father) in his feud with Al Snow. They also feuded with The Headbangers, The Oddities, 8-Ball and Skull and The Hardy Boyz.

In June 1999, Christopher became Grand Master Sexay, Taylor became Scotty Too Hotty (later spelled as Scotty 2 Hotty) and Too Much was rebranded as Too Cool, debuting on television during the June 13, 1999 episode of Sunday Night Heat, however a knee injury for Grand Master Sexay meant that they didn't have their first match under these new personas until October 1999. They originally remained villainous characters, but in late 1999, around the time Rikishi joined the team, they turned into fan favorites. Too Cool's new characteristic was that of hip-hop fans, which saw the trio of Scotty 2 Hotty, Grand Master Sexay and Rikishi dancing around the ring while lights flashed and dance music played, an act that quickly became very popular with fans. In addition to the wildly popular post-match dancing routine, several of Too Cool's signature moves became extremely popular with the fans, including Scotty 2 Hotty's "The Worm" and Rikishi's Stink Face.

==== 2000–2001 ====
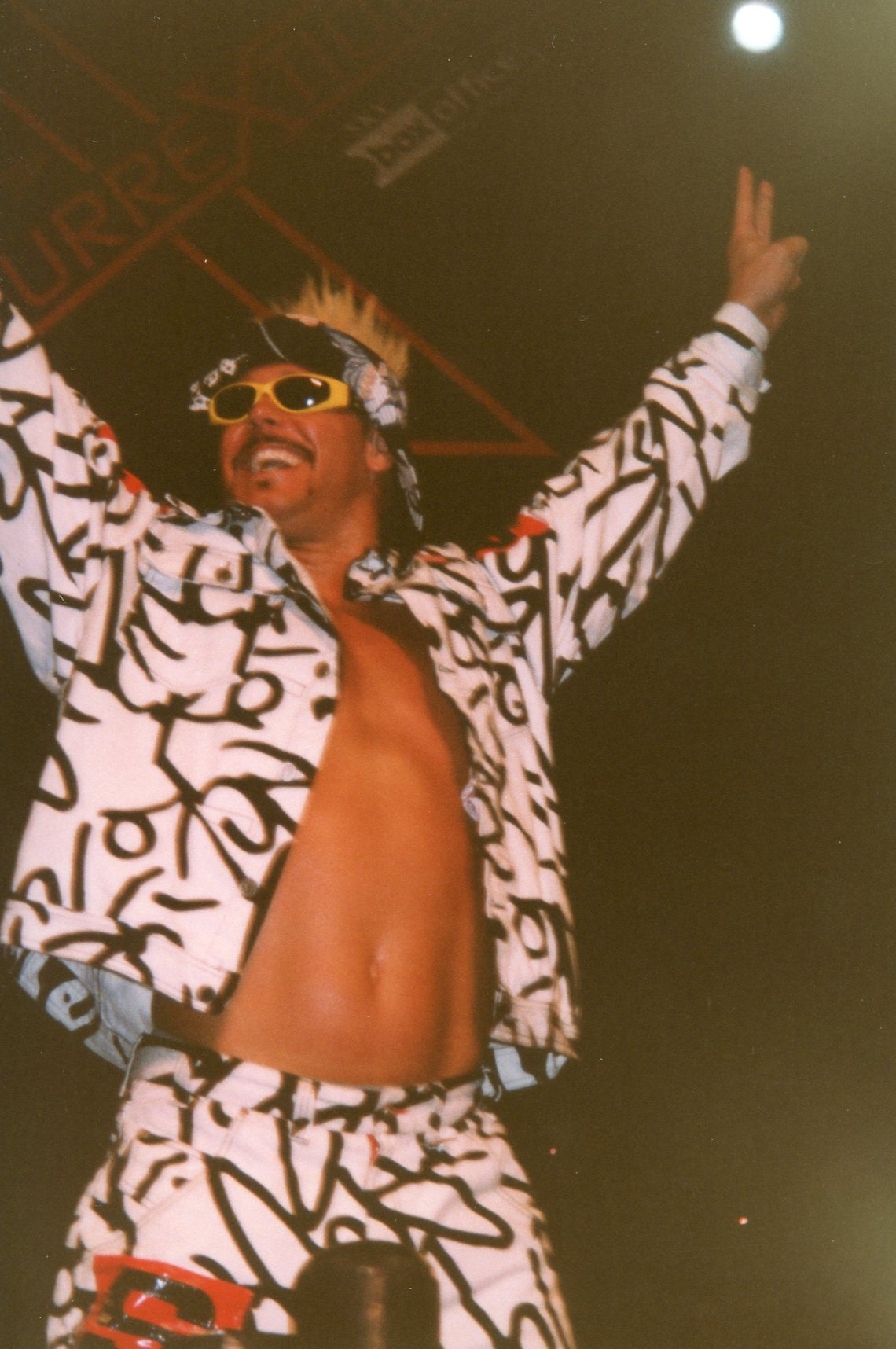
Scotty 2 Hotty in the year 2000

A famous moment came when the trio were all participants in the 2000 Royal Rumble. Rikishi had eliminated all three entrants in the match thus far, leaving only him and Grand Master Sexay in the ring. Rikishi looked as if he was about to throw Grand Master Sexay out of the ring to eliminate him from the Rumble, but Scotty 2 Hotty entered the match next and convinced Rikishi to instead dance to their music while the Rumble match was still ongoing. At the conclusion of their dance segment in the middle of the Rumble, Rikishi surprised his teammates by delivering a double clothesline and throwing them both to the outside to eliminate them. Rikishi shrugged his shoulders and his partners accepted the elimination with a good humor; no dissension would arise between them. Soon after this, Christopher suffered an injury and while he was recuperating, Scotty won the Light Heavyweight Championship.

Too Cool received arguably their biggest push when they became embroiled in a feud against the McMahon-Helmsley Regime, mainly wrestling against D-Generation X members Triple H, Road Dogg, and X-Pac, along with a feud against The Radicalz. Too Cool participated in several main events on television during this push, including a 10-man tag team match on WWF Raw where they teamed with The Rock and Cactus Jack against Triple H, X-Pac, and The Radicalz.

Too Cool's success would peak in the middle of 2000 when Scotty 2 Hotty and Grand Master Sexay defeated Edge and Christian for the Tag Team Championship on the May 29, 2000 episode of Raw, while Rikishi would defeat Chris Benoit for the Intercontinental Championship on the June 20 edition of SmackDown!

Despite enjoying immense popularity among the fans, Too Cool began to fragment in late 2000 when Rikishi left the group after becoming a villain. In March 2001, Too Cool fully disbanded when Scotty was, in storyline, sidelined with a broken ankle caused by Kurt Angle. In reality, he needed time off for neck surgery. During that time, Sexay teamed up with Steve Blackman. In May 2001, Sexay was released from the WWF after he was detained while attempting to cross the Canada–United States border with illegal drugs in his possession. After returning in June 2001, Scotty formed a new tag team with Albert called The Zoo Crew that lasted from November 2001 until March 2002. Scotty would injure his neck in April 2002 and was inactive for over a year.

==== 2003–2004 ====
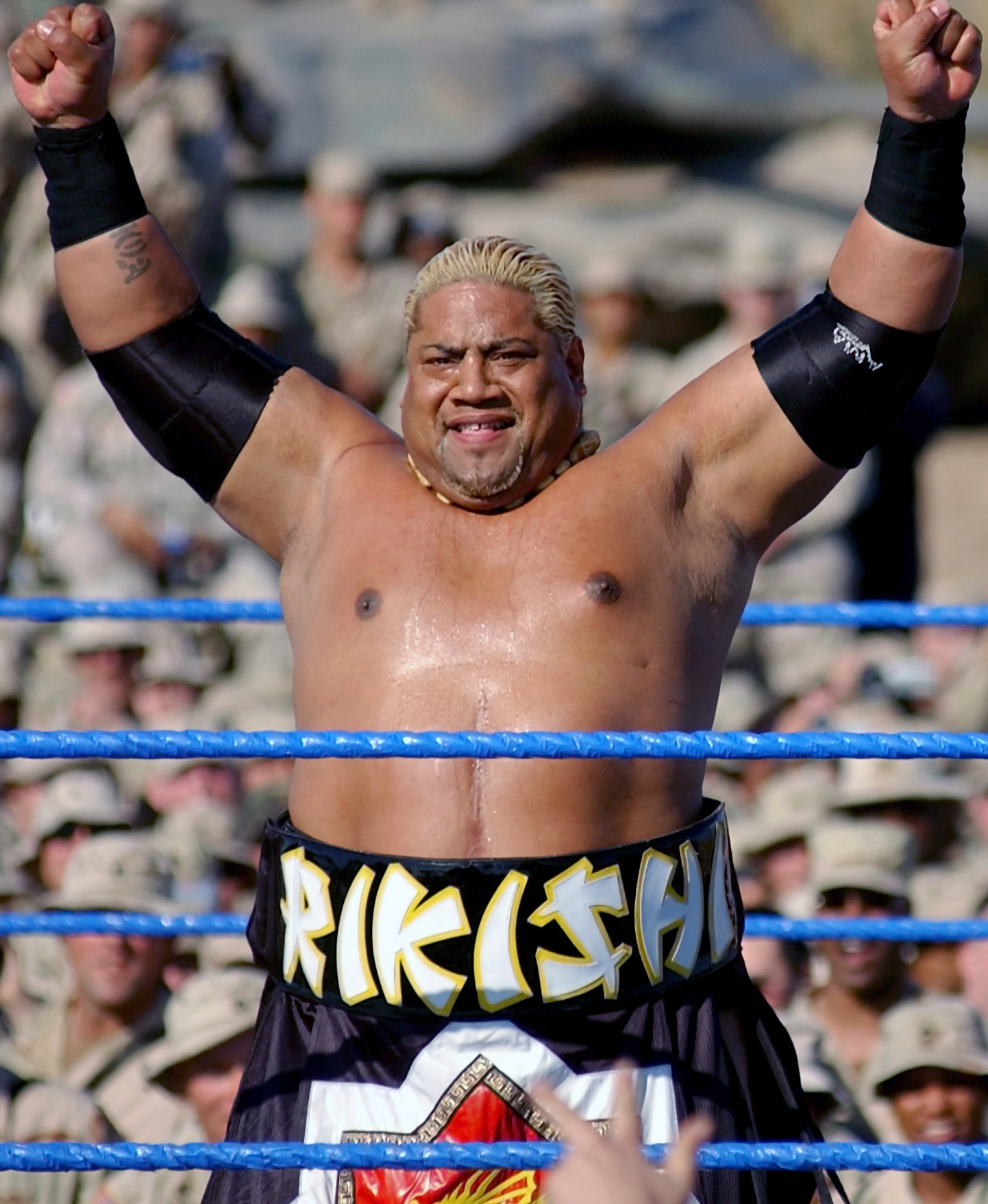
Rikishi at Tribute to the Troops in 2003

Rikishi would eventually become a face again and reunited with Scotty 2 Hotty, who returned after an 18 month absence from a neck injury to compete on the SmackDown! brand in October 2003. Rikishi and Scotty 2 Hotty won the WWE Tag Team Championship on February 5, 2004 after defeating the Basham Brothers. Also around this time, the WWE briefly re-hired Grand Master Sexay, although he was on the Raw brand and had no interaction with Scotty 2 Hotty or Rikishi. They held the title for a little over two months, including a successful title defense at WrestleMania XX, before losing the titles to Charlie Haas and Rico on April 22. Rikishi would be released from the company shortly after the title loss, while Scotty remained with the company until being released on May 15, 2007.

==== 2014 ====
On the January 6, 2014 episode of Old School Raw, Too Cool reunited with Rikishi, defeating 3MB (Heath Slater, Drew McIntyre and Jinder Mahal) in a six-man tag match. This was the first time in over 13 years that the trio were in a 6-man tag team match. Too Cool also appeared at NXT Arrival, challenging The Ascension for the NXT Tag Team Championship. The Ascension would prevail however, retaining the titles.

=== Independent circuit (2003, 2007-2016) ===
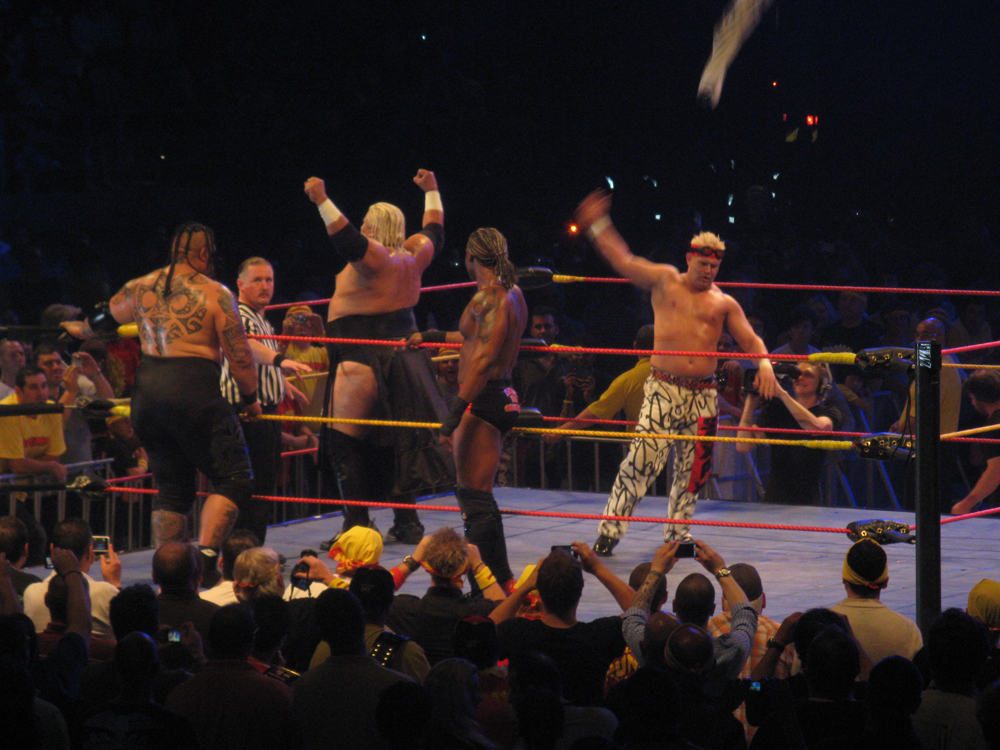
Grand Master Sexay and Rikishi against Orlando Jordan and Umaga in Australia, 2009

Sexay and Hotty would reunite after 2 1/2 years for one night on September 28, 2003, for Memphis Wrestling. They defeated Doug Gilbert and Shock.

After Scotty 2 Hotty was released from WWE in May 2007, he briefly reunited with Grand Master Sexay to compete for the UWF Live's Rock 'n' Express Tag Team Tournament. In the second round of the tournament on July 19, 2007, Too Cool defeated the Extreme Horsemen (C. W. Anderson and Steve Corino). The next day, Too Cool lost to the Steiner Brothers (Rick and Scott) in the semi-final match of the Winner's Bracket. Too Cool made their final appearance for the UWF on July 21 as they lost to The Naturals in the third round match of the Loser's Bracket.

In 2009, Sexay and Rikishi reunited to compete for the Hulk Hogan's Hulkamania: Let The Battle Begin Tour in Australia. Due to copyright issues with World Wrestling Entertainment, Sexay and Rikishi competed as Brian Christopher and Solofa Fatu, Jr., respectively, and were unable to use the Too Cool name. On November 21, the first night of the tour, they defeated Orlando Jordan and Umaga. Three days later, they defeated Rock of Love (Billy Blade and Kadin Anthony). On November 26, Christopher and Fatu teamed with The Nasty Boys (Brian Knobbs and Jerry Sags) to defeat Black Pearl, Vampire Warrior and Rock of Love. On November 28, the final night of the tour, Fatu and Christopher defeated Pearl and Warrior. Later, the three would go on to reunite in Gangrel's Territory League promotion as part of the Las Vegas Highrollers team.

In March 2014, Grand Master Sexay and Scotty 2 Hotty reunited at Memphis Power Wrestling's Revenge at Resorts II Cool Event to compete against Chase Stevens and Crimson. Too Cool won the match, but were attacked post-match by Cerebus, Doug Gilbert, and Bill Dundee. On September 5, 2014, Too Cool faced the Maryland Championship Wrestling (MCW) Tag Team Champions The Black Wall Street (Napalm Bomb and Solo) in a losing effort.

On February 22, 2015, Scotty and Sexay made an appearance at Lincoln Fight Factory Wrestling Turn It Up, defeating S C Supreme and Stixx. Their last match as a team was in 2016. They continued to make appearances at conventions and some independent wrestling shows until Brian Christopher Lawler's death in July 2018.

== Championships and accomplishments ==
- World Wrestling Federation / World Wrestling Entertainment
  - WWF Intercontinental Championship (1 time) - Rikishi
  - WWF Light Heavyweight Championship (1 time) - Scotty
  - WWF Tag Team Championship (1 time) - Scotty and Sexay
  - WWE Tag Team Championship (1 time) - Scotty and Rikishi
