= People's Elbow =

Professional wrestling move by The Rock

The People's Elbow (Technical name: Running elbow drop with theatrics) is a professional wrestling move used by American professional wrestler The Rock as his finisher. The move, a choreographed jump presented as a body slam led by an elbow, is recognized as one of the most iconic and well-known signature maneuvers in WWE history.

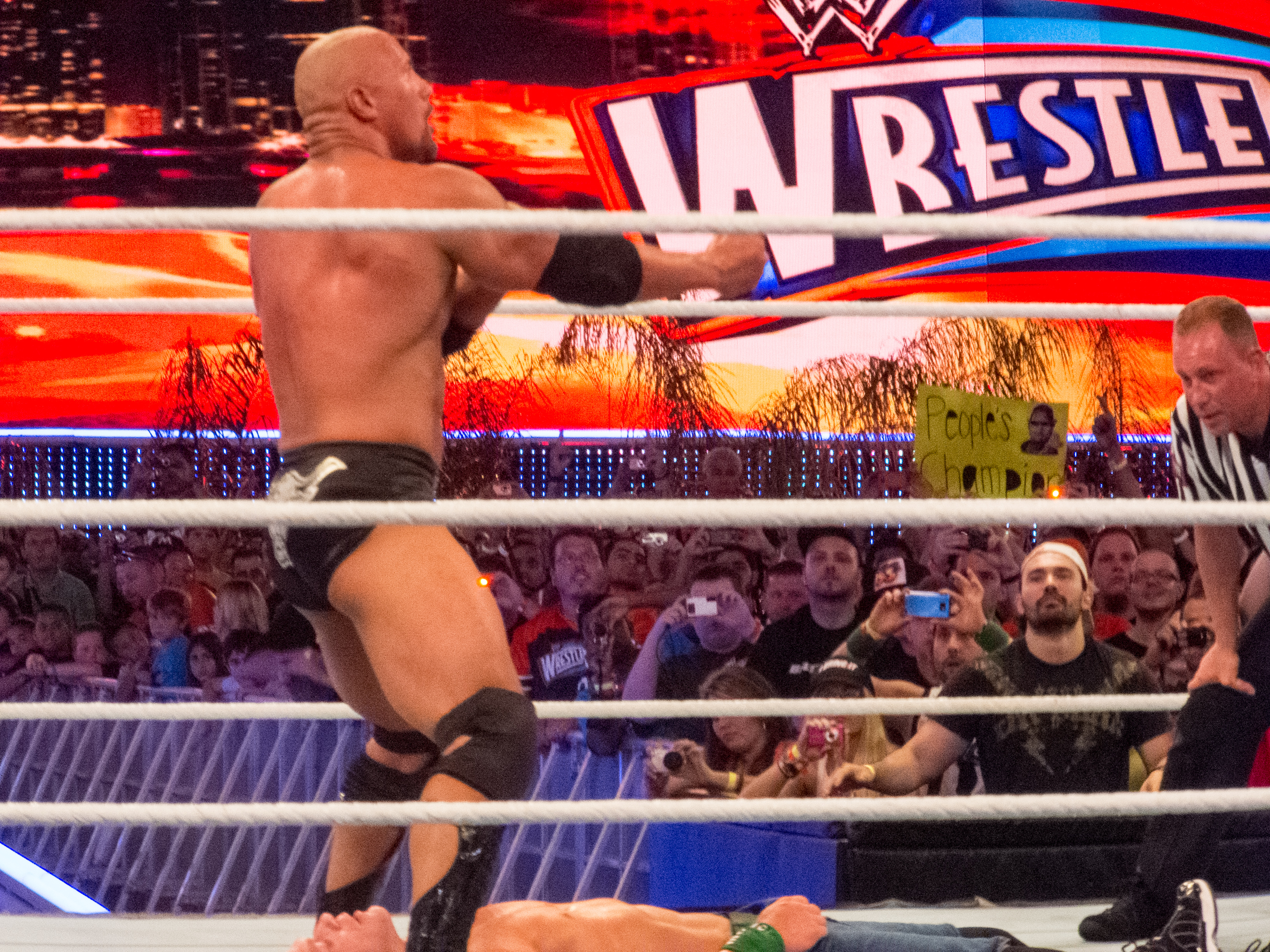
The Rock performed the People's Elbow on John Cena at WrestleMania 28.

== History ==
The People’s Elbow was first introduced in the late 1990s, coinciding with the rise of Dwayne "The Rock" Johnson’s character in the World Wrestling Federation (WWF, later renamed WWE). The Rock took the move from Great Muta: the Flashing Elbow. Journalist Chris Van Vliet believes that Ken Shamrock was either one of, or the first, opponents to take the move.

Gradually, the move became The Rock’s primary finisher and played a significant role in his widespread popularity among fans. Unlike many finishing moves that rely on strength or complex techniques, the People’s Elbow emphasizes showmanship, timing, and audience interaction. Its execution is often accompanied by theatrical elements, such as removing the elbow pad and throwing it into the crowd, which heightens excitement in the arena.

Both Triple H and The Undertaker have claimed that the move was originally intended as a rib to make Undertaker break kayfabe and was never meant as a serious finisher. The move was later named on commentary by Rock's former Nation of Domination stablemate D'Lo Brown. During Rock's heel run with The Corporation, it was renamed "The Corporate Elbow".

== Execution ==
To perform the move, The Rock first lays his opponent flat on their back in the ring. He then stands over the opponent and looks toward the fans to build anticipation. Next, he removes his right elbow pad and tosses it into the crowd, performs an exaggerated cross-arm motion, moves toward the left side of the ring, and rebounds off the ropes. Upon returning, he runs toward his opponent, hitting the ropes on the right side of the ring, and then rebounds back, creating the appearance of driving his elbow onto the opponent’s chest. Although the elbow never makes contact with the other performer's chest, the move is presented as genuine combat in kayfabe. Occasionally, if the right elbow pad has already been used, The Rock repeats the sequence with the left elbow pad. In some cases, if both elbow pads have been used, the move is executed without one.

== Reception and criticism ==
The People’s Elbow has been described by critics and professional wrestling analysts as an iconic move, though some consider it less technically effective than other finishing moves, with Anthony Benigno of WWE.com stating one of the reasons being it takes an average of 10 seconds to execute.

== Cultural impact ==
The maneuver has been widely referenced in popular culture. In video games, it has been used in The King of Fighters 2002: Challenge to Ultimate Battle by Ángel, has been featured in the Tekken franchise as the "Corporate Elbow". In professional wrestling, Ricochet honored The Rock by performing his own variation of the move named "The People's Moonsault", where he ran the ropes and performed a moonsault instead of an elbow drop. At mainstream sporting events, it has been performed as a celebration in soccer by James Norwood during his tenure with Ipswich Town F.C in August 2019, at WrestleMania 39 in April 2023 by celebrity host Snoop Dogg who used the move to win a match against The Miz, and in MMA by fighter Miguel Sanson at APFC 16 in March 2025.

=== NFL ===
One of the first documented instances of the move being used within the NFL was in October 2017 by Golden Tate, who was a receiver for the Detroit Lions at the time. In 2025, it was included as a celebration taunt in Madden NFL 26. On September 20, 2026, Cincinnati Bengals wide receivers Tee Higgins and Ja'Marr Chase performed taunts that were inspired by The People's Elbow as celebrations in their Week 2 win against the Houston Texans. Four days later, Chase revealed that the league had intended to fine them both for the "forward-elbow motioning gesture" that he had been using over the course of the season, despite his claim of it being "a wrestling move". In a press conference held at Paycor Stadium, Chase demonstrated the taunt and explained it was an "elbow and first-down", though the league went ahead with fining Higgins four times and Chase twice, with each being set at $14,926, and their overall total coming to $89,556. By October 13, Chase ultimately won appeals of his fines, and they were subsequently rescinded, though it was not disclosed if Higgins' fines had also been rescinded.
