= The Radicalz =

Professional wrestling stable

The Radicalz (WWF); The Revolution (WCW)

Stable
- Members: Chris Benoit; Eddie Guerrero; Dean Malenko; Perry Saturn; Shane Douglas (WCW); Asya (WCW); Terri (WWF)
- Debut: July 29, 1999
- Disbanded: August 9, 2001
- Years active: 1999–2001

The Radicalz (stylized as The R4dicalz), also known as The Revolution, were a professional wrestling stable in World Championship Wrestling (WCW) (as the Revolution) and the World Wrestling Federation (WWF, now WWE) (as the Radicalz) that debuted in July 1999. The group consisted primarily of Eddie Guerrero, Chris Benoit, Perry Saturn, and Dean Malenko.

The stable is notable for consisting of four well-known wrestlers who would jump ship during the Monday Night War. Within three months of joining the WWF, each member would hold a different championship at various points: Benoit with the WWF Intercontinental Championship, Guerrero with the WWF European Championship, Malenko with the WWF Light Heavyweight Championship, and Saturn with the WWF Hardcore Championship.

== History ==
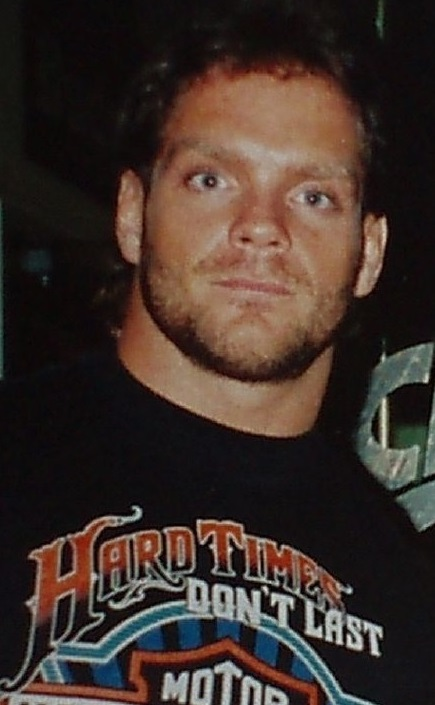
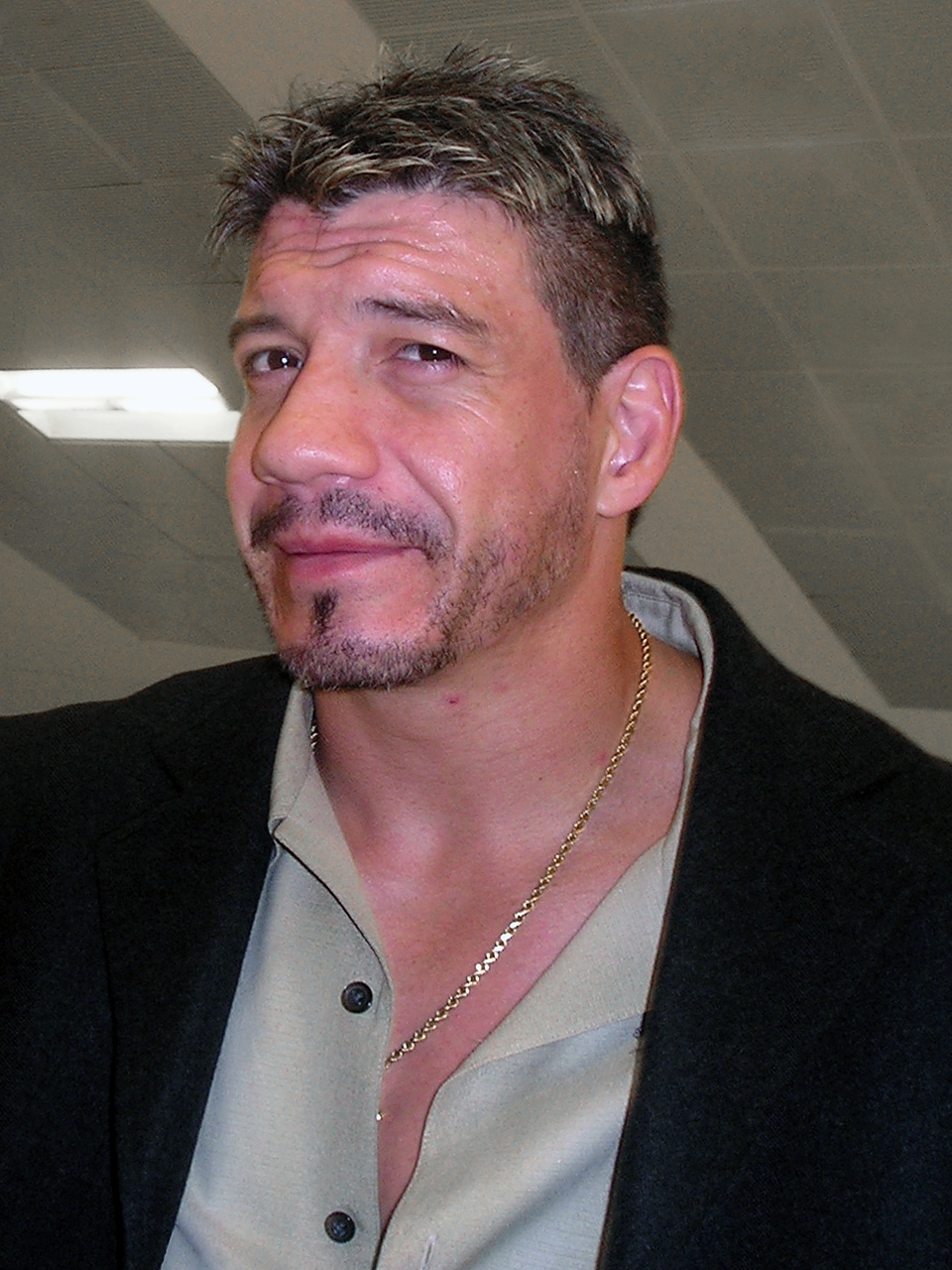
The Radicalz: Chris Benoit, Dean Malenko, Eddie Guerrero, and Perry Saturn.

=== Origins ===
Benoit, Malenko and Guerrero toured the world before signing with WCW. Their lack of size did not translate well in the United States, but their respective styles were popular in countries like Mexico, Canada and particularly Japan.The trio would face off repeatedly, forcing them to spend a lot of time together.

They caught the attention of Philadelphia-based promotion Extreme Championship Wrestling's (ECW) booker and promoter Paul Heyman. Heyman was keen to introduce the Mexican lucha libre style to the United States professional wrestling fans, and he saw Guerrero as an ideal example of this. He also loved the technical styles of Benoit and Malenko, so Heyman booked all three men in his company. It would be here that they met Perry Saturn, a traditional power wrestler and brawler, but he did not become a member of the group until they all signed contracts with WCW.

=== World Championship Wrestling ===
In 1999, many WCW mid-card to upper-level stars became unhappy with the political environment of WCW.Management offered anyone who was unhappy a chance to be released from their contracts. Scott Levy aka Raven was singled out for his comments on WCW by WCW President Eric Bischoff and offered an opportunity to negotiate his release with the WCW lawyers immediately if he was so unhappy, which Levy did. The contract forbade Levy from signing with the WWF for the length of terms of his original WCW contract. However, Levy did not see this as an issue and re-debuted in ECW less than a week later in August 1999. His attitude inspired other wrestlers who followed suit.

At the time of the jump, Benoit, Malenko and Saturn were members of a stable in WCW called The Revolution, whose leader was "The Franchise" Shane Douglas, which further fueled the rumors that Douglas wanted in on the jump.

The Revolution was formed by Chris Benoit and Dean Malenko (leftovers from the last incarnation of the Four Horsemen), Perry Saturn and Shane Douglas on the July 29, 1999 edition of WCW Thunder. When the group first came together as fan favorites, it was with the idea that they were a group of younger wrestlers who had felt slighted by WCW management, never giving them the chance to be stars, while always giving older, more established wrestlers the top spots.

The concept held some truth, and in reality the stable was actually made up of close friends, as Douglas, Benoit, Malenko and Saturn knew each other from their days in Extreme Championship Wrestling (ECW). Douglas, Benoit, and Malenko also were the original Triple Threat stable in ECW, while Saturn was part of The Eliminators with John Kronus. During a house show on September 11 at the Baltimore Arena, three days after the death of WCW referee Mark Curtis, Douglas, Benoit and Malenko paid tribute to their friend and dedicated the show to him.

In October of that year, after Vince Russo became head writer, the gimmick of the group changed to one that was anti-America and anti-government. This was established with Benoit taking a microphone, looking toward the entrance stage, and stating that they were "tired of the politics going on in the back". This blurred the line between storyline and real-life in regards to how WCW was being managed.

The group even went so far as to create their own flag and claim to have left the United States and formed their own government. Their theme music had a guitar and percussion sound very similar to Marilyn Manson's "The Beautiful People".

Benoit and Malenko left the group in October, but Malenko turned on Benoit in a setup where Malenko had never really left The Revolution. The Revolution then added Asya and feuded with The Filthy Animals. The Revolution kidnapped Torrie Wilson and put her freedom up in a match against The Filthy Animals, which they lost.

At the time of their departure to the WWF, Benoit was recognized as the WCW World Heavyweight Champion, having won the vacant title by defeating Sid Vicious at Souled Out. In reality, then WCW head booker Kevin Sullivan decided to give Benoit the title as an attempt to keep him in WCW. The two never saw eye-to-eye, however, a primary reason believed to have been Benoit becoming romantically involved in real-life with Sullivan's wife Nancy (Nancy and Sullivan were separated, but not yet divorced) – Benoit and Nancy later married. WCW management later stated on Nitro that Vicious' foot was under the ropes at the time Benoit forced the submission and therefore his title reign was deemed invalid. However, the WWF would recognize the title change.

In January 2000, Malenko, Saturn and Benoit left WCW along with Eddie Guerrero in a dispute with management and formed The Radicalz in the World Wrestling Federation (WWF, now WWE), while Douglas took a hiatus, before returning to WCW in April.

==== Members ====
L	Leader(s)
*	Founding member(s)

=== WCW ===
Members	Joined	Left
Shane Douglas (L)	July 29, 1999 *	January 16, 2000
Chris Benoit	July 29, 1999 *	October 11, 1999
Dean Malenko	July 29, 1999 *	January 16, 2000
Perry Saturn	July 29, 1999 *	January 16, 2000
Asya	October 24, 1999	January 6, 2000

=== World Wrestling Federation ===
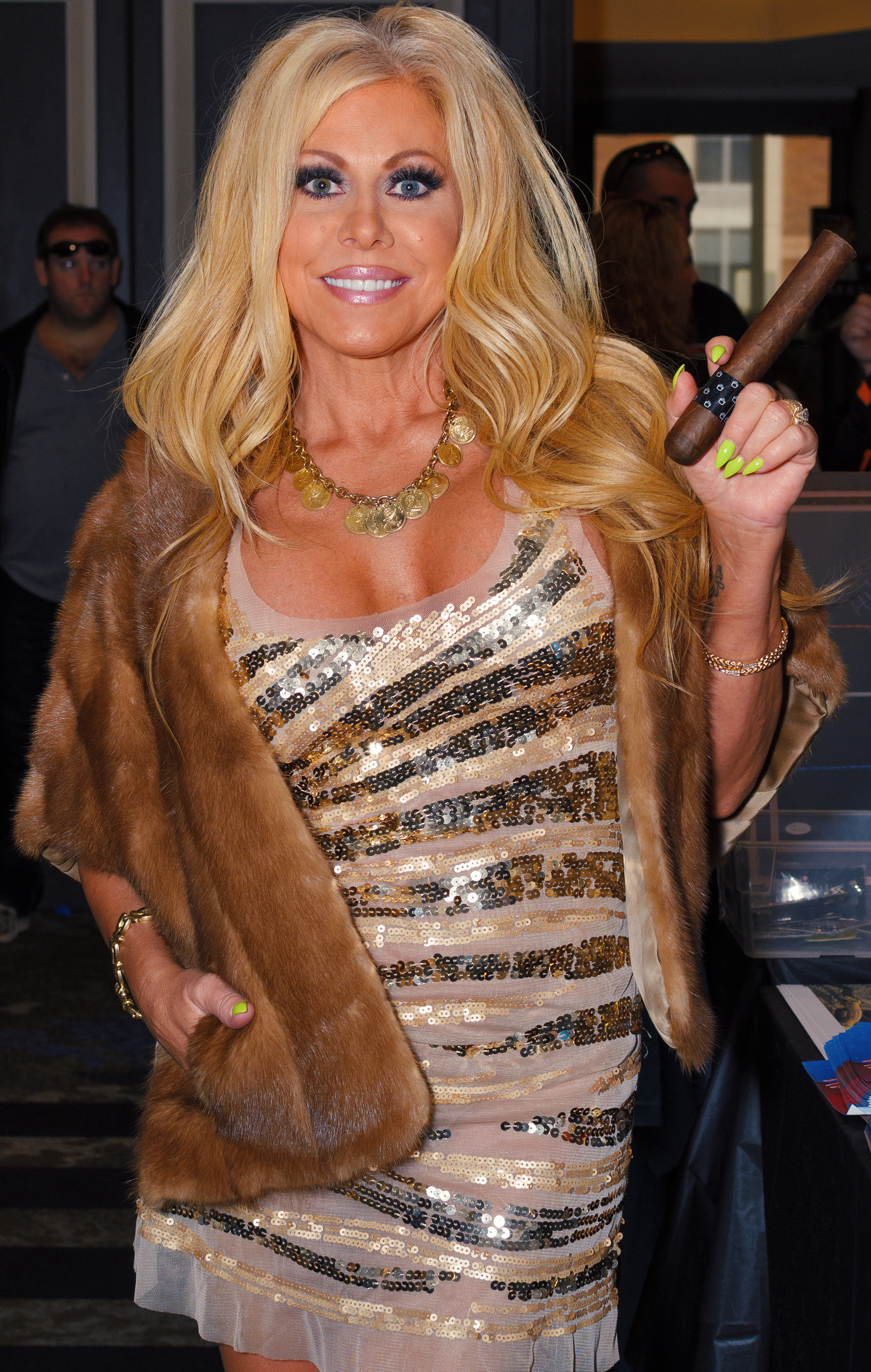
Terri, who joined The Radicalz as Perry Saturn's valet.

The four first made their appearance on the January 31, 2000 episode of Raw Is War as audience members and backstage guests of Mick Foley. They interfered in a match consisting of Al Snow and Steve Blackman and The New Age Outlaws. While the group was sitting in the front row, Road Dogg took a cheap shot at Benoit, which prompted all four to severely beat both of The New Age Outlaws inside and out of the ring. The attack ended after Guerrero performed a frog splash on Billy Gunn and Benoit performed a diving headbutt on Dogg, with Jim Ross dubbing them The Radicalz. The four were offered a chance to "win" contracts by beating the members of D-Generation X in a series of three matches. Malenko lost to X-Pac after an illegal groin attack, while Saturn and Guerrero ended up losing against The New Age Outlaws, since Dogg had pulled the referee out of the ring when Guerrero was covering Gunn for the pin after a frog splash, thereby illegally breaking up the cover. Benoit then lost to Triple H, but not before making him tap out to the Crippler Crossface while the referee was unconscious. Soon afterwards, the four wrestlers were "given" contracts with the WWF by Triple H, in exchange for them turning on Mick Foley. The group became known as The Radicalz (sometimes spelled The Radicals in on-screen graphics), and they attained some measure of success. At first tightly knit, all four of the wrestlers in the group eventually drifted apart as all of them sought stardom as singles wrestlers in the WWF.

Saturn and Malenko formed a tag team, with the injured Guerrero serving as a manager for the team. Benoit sought singles success and only worked with the stable when he required back up. Malenko quickly won the WWF Light Heavyweight Championship, annoying Benoit. Varying levels of success caused a rift within the group, and they quietly separated. However, Saturn turned on Guerrero, instigating a feud over the WWF European Championship.

The four drifted apart mainly in the summer of 2000 to pursue individual goals, but in November of that year the group reformed and aligned themselves with Triple H as his secondaries/hired guns during his feud with Stone Cold Steve Austin. In early 2001, Benoit had turned into a fan favorite during a rivalry with Kurt Angle, while the other Radicalz remained villains and eventually forced Benoit out of the group, with Guerrero replacing him as the leader.

Guerrero eventually turned into a fan favorite as well, and had a short alliance with Team Xtreme (The Hardy Boyz and Lita), but went to rehab in June 2001 for alcohol abuse. Guerrero completed a three-month program and had started working house shows to get ready for his return to television, but was released by the WWF in November 2001 after getting arrested for driving while intoxicated. Saturn, Terri and Malenko continued as The Radicalz until Malenko's retirement, making their final appearance together on the July 3, 2001 episode of SmackDown! where a frustrated Malenko attacked Saturn after his erratic behavior disrupted a bout between Malenko and Scotty 2 Hotty.

Malenko and Saturn had one more match together defeating Justin Credible and Raven on August 9, 2001 at the Brian Pillman Memorial Show for Heartland Wrestling Association.

=== Aftermath ===
Guerrero was re-signed by the WWF in March 2002, and was paired with Benoit to coincide with his return from injury (though not as The Radicalz). The duo would separate after jumping to the SmackDown! brand, but interacted on occasion, either as opponents or allies. The most notable instance occurred at WrestleMania XX, where the two celebrated together after successfully reigning as world champions, as Guerrero retained the WWE Championship and Benoit won the World Heavyweight Championship. They would wrestle their final match against each other at the first ECW One Night Stand event.

Guerrero died from acute heart failure due to arteriosclerotic cardiovascular disease on November 13, 2005, while Benoit committed suicide on June 24, 2007 after murdering his wife and son. Both Guerrero and Benoit were still employed by WWE at the time of their deaths. Malenko retired from in-ring competition in 2001, but remained with WWE as a road agent until departing the company in 2019 and joining All Elite Wrestling. Saturn was released by WWE in 2002 and, after a few years where his whereabouts were unknown due to homelessness and drug addiction, remained active on the independent circuit until his retirement in 2013. Terri left WWE in April 2004 after eight years with the company and is no longer involved in the professional wrestling industry.

== Members ==
I–II	Leader(s)
*	Founding member(s)

Members	Joined	Left
Chris Benoit (I)	January 31, 2000 *	March 5, 2001
Eddie Guerrero (II)	January 31, 2000 *	May 14, 2001
Dean Malenko	January 31, 2000 *	August 9, 2001
Perry Saturn	January 31, 2000 *	August 9, 2001
Terri	July 23, 2000	August 9, 2001

== Championships and accomplishments ==
- World Championship Wrestling
  - WCW United States Heavyweight Championship (1 time) – Benoit
  - WCW World Television Championship (1 time) – Benoit
- World Wrestling Federation
  - WWF Hardcore Championship (2 times) – Perry Saturn
  - WWF Light Heavyweight Championship (2 times) – Dean Malenko
  - WWF European Championship (3 times) – Eddie Guerrero (2) and Perry Saturn (1)
  - WWF Intercontinental Championship (3 times) – Chris Benoit (2) and Eddie Guerrero (1)
