= D-Generation X: In Your House =

1997 World Wrestling Federation pay-per-view event

- Promotional poster featuring Shawn Michaels
- Promotion: World Wrestling Federation
- Date: December 7, 1997
- City: Springfield, Massachusetts
- Venue: Springfield Civic Center
- Attendance: 6,358
- Buy rate: 144,000
- Tagline: Attitude Is Everything

Pay-per-view chronology
← Previous; Survivor Series	Next → Royal Rumble

In Your House chronology
← Previous; Badd Blood	Next → No Way Out of Texas

D-Generation X: In Your House (also spelled as Degeneration X: In Your House) was a 1997 professional wrestling pay-per-view (PPV) event produced by the World Wrestling Federation (WWF, renamed WWE in 2002) and presented by Milton Bradley's Karate Fighters. It was the 19th In Your House and took place on December 7, 1997, at the Springfield Civic Center in Springfield, Massachusetts. The name of the show was in reference to the more prominent matches at the event featuring members of D-Generation X (DX).

Eight matches were contested at the event. In the main event, Ken Shamrock defeated DX's Shawn Michaels by disqualification in a match for the WWF Championship, but Michaels retained as titles do not change hands by disqualification unless stipulated. Notable matches on the undercard included "Stone Cold" Steve Austin defeating "The Rock" Rocky Maivia to retain the WWF Intercontinental Championship, DX's The New Age Outlaws (Road Dogg and Billy Gunn) defeating The Legion of Doom (Hawk and Animal) by disqualification to retain the WWF Tag Team Championship, and WWF Commissioner Sgt. Slaughter coming out of retirement to lose a Boot Camp match to DX's Triple H. The was also the WWF's first event to feature the WWF Light Heavyweight Championship, where Taka Michinoku defeated Brian Christopher to become who the company recognizes as the inaugural champion.

== Production ==
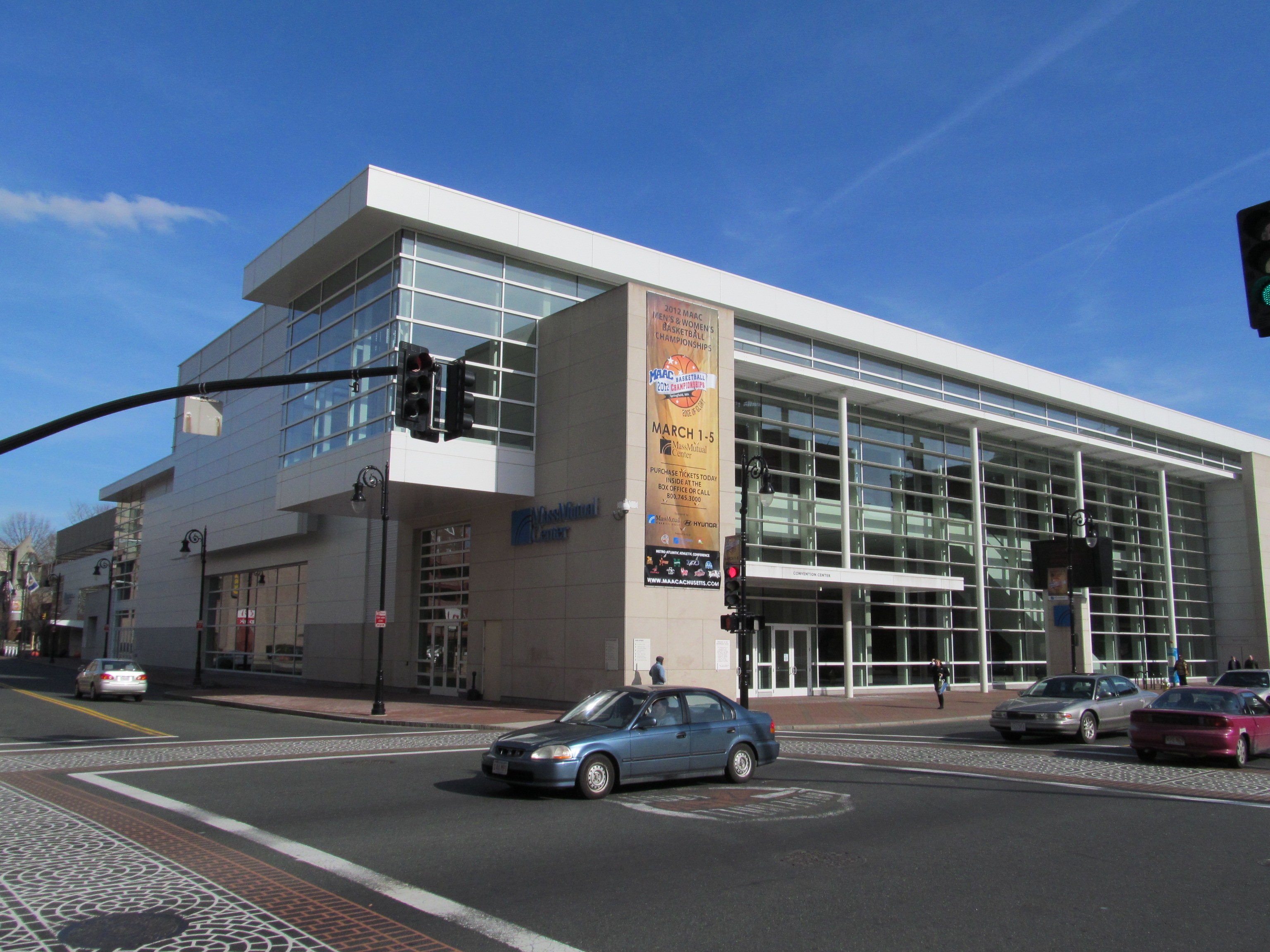
The 19th In Your House was held in Springfield, Massachusetts at the Springfield Civic Center (pictured as MassMutual Center, renamed in 2005).

=== Background ===
In Your House was a series of monthly professional wrestling pay-per-view (PPV) events first produced by the World Wrestling Federation (WWF, renamed WWE in 2002) in May 1995. They aired when the promotion was not holding one of its then-five major PPVs (WrestleMania, King of the Ring, SummerSlam, Survivor Series, and Royal Rumble) and were sold at a lower cost. The 19th In Your House, titled D-Generation X: In Your House (also spelled as Degeneration X: In Your House) was scheduled for December 7, 1997, at the Springfield Civic Center in Springfield, Massachusetts. The name of the show was based on the more prominent matches featuring members of D-Generation X (DX).

=== Storylines ===
The main feud heading into D-Generation X: In Your House was between DX's Shawn Michaels and Ken Shamrock over the WWF Championship. The feud started after Bret Hart left the WWF to join rival company World Championship Wrestling (WCW) after the infamous "Montreal Screwjob" at Survivor Series. Shamrock, who recently returned from an injury that had been caused by the Nation of Domination in September, was named the number one contender for Michaels's WWF Championship. On the December 1 episode of Raw is War, Michaels taunted Shamrock, saying that he would not be able to break Michaels's ankle (a reference to Shamrock's signature ankle lock). Later on that night, Michaels, and his D-Generation X teammates, Chyna and Triple H, humiliated and assaulted Jim "The Anvil" Neidhart, until Shamrock and WWF commissioner Sgt. Slaughter saved Neidhart, with Shamrock locking in the Ankle Lock on Michaels and Sgt. Slaughter applying the Cobra Clutch to Triple H. Slaughter then challenged Triple H to a Boot Camp match, which he accepted.

Another major feud heading into the event was between "Stone Cold" Steve Austin and "The Rock" Rocky Maivia for the WWF Intercontinental Championship. On the November 17 episode of Raw is War, The Rock stole Austin's Intercontinental Championship as Austin was engaged in a brawl with The Rock's Nation of Domination stablemates. In the weeks leading up to the event, The Rock taunted Austin with the title, while declaring himself as the "best damn Intercontinental Champion there ever was". Austin retaliated with mind games of his own, including driving his pickup truck into the arena during The Rock's match with Vader on the December 1 episode of Raw is War.

== Event ==
Other on-screen personnel
Role:	Name:
Commentators	Jim Ross
Commentators	Jerry Lawler
Ring announcer	Howard Finkel
Referees	Jack Doan
Referees	Mike Chioda
Referees	Tim White
Referees	Jimmy Korderas
Referees	Earl Hebner
Interviewers	Michael Cole
Interviewers	Dok Hendrix
Interviewers	Jim Cornette

The opening bout was the final match in a tournament to determine the inaugural WWF Light Heavyweight Champion, with Brian Christopher facing Taka Michinoku. The match ended when Christopher attempted to give Michinoku a Tennessee Jam and missed, enabling Michinoku to hit Christopher with the Michinoku Driver, and then pin him to win the title.

The second bout was a six-man tag team match pitting the Disciples of Apocalypse against Los Boricuas. Los Boricuas won the bout by pinfall following a leg drop by Miguel Pérez Jr.

The third bout was a "toughman match" between Marc Mero and professional boxer Butterbean. The match ended in the fourth round when Mero gave Butterbean a low blow, causing a disqualification. Mero then attacked Butterbean with a stool until being driven away.

The fourth bout saw WWF Tag Team Champions the New Age Outlaws defend their titles against the Legion of Doom. The match ended when Henry Godwinn came to the ring and hit Animal with a "slop bucket", after which Hawk seized the bucket, and used it to hit Billy Gunn, resulting in the Legion of Doom being disqualified.

The fifth bout was a "Boot Camp match" between Sgt. Slaughter and Triple H. The match ended when Slaughter applied the Cobra Clutch to Triple H, only for Triple H's bodyguard Chyna to give him a low blow, enabling Triple H to hit Slaughter with the Pedigree, and pin him.

The sixth bout was a singles match between Jeff Jarrett and The Undertaker, with an added stipulation that the winner would become the number one contender for the WWF Championship. Jarrett won the match by disqualification after Kane entered the ring to attack The Undertaker, chokeslamming Jarrett after he got in his way. After Kane left the ring, Jarrett attacked The Undertaker from behind, only to be chokeslammed once again.

The seventh bout saw WWF Intercontinental Champion "Stone Cold" Steve Austin defend his title against "The Rock" Rocky Maivia. The match began with Austin driving his pickup truck to ringside, and brawling with Maivia's Nation of Domination allies, eventually back body dropping D'Lo Brown through the truck's windshield. Towards the end of the match, Austin accidentally gave a Stone Cold Stunner to the referee. Austin then gave a Stone Cold Stunner to Rocky and pinned him to retain the title, with a second referee counting the pinfall.

The main event saw WWF Champion Shawn Michaels defend his title against Ken Shamrock. The match ended when Shamrock applied an ankle lock to Michaels, upon which Michaels' D-Generation X allies Triple H and Chyna attacked Shamrock before Michaels could submit, resulting in Shamrock winning the bout by disqualification (meaning the title did not change hands). Following the match, Owen Hart made his return to the WWF, viciously attacking Michaels before retreating into the audience.

== Reception ==
In 2014, Kevin Pantoja of 411Mania gave the event a rating of 4.0 [Poor], stating, "Too many disqualification finishes. Of the eight matches, four of them ended in a DQ. The opener was the best match, and the final two matches weren't terrible. The six-man tag, Butterbean stuff, Tag Title match, and Boot Camp match were all crap though and that's too much crap on one show."

== Results ==
No.	Results	Stipulations	Times
1	Taka Michinoku defeated Brian Christopher	Singles match for the inaugural WWF Light Heavyweight Championship	12:02
2	Los Boricuas (Miguel Pérez Jr., Jesús Castillo Jr., and José Estrada Jr.) (with Savio Vega) defeated The Disciples of Apocalypse (Chainz, 8-Ball, and Skull)	Six-man tag team match	7:58
3	Butterbean defeated Marc Mero (with Sable) by disqualification	Toughman match	10:20
4	The New Age Outlaws (Road Dogg and Billy Gunn) (c) defeated The Legion of Doom (Hawk and Animal) by disqualification	Tag team match for the WWF Tag Team Championship	10:32
5	Triple H (with Chyna) defeated Sgt. Slaughter	Boot Camp match	17:39
6	Jeff Jarrett defeated The Undertaker by disqualification	Singles match	6:54
7	"Stone Cold" Steve Austin (c) defeated "The Rock" Rocky Maivia (with Faarooq, D'Lo Brown, and Kama Mustafa)	Singles match for the WWF Intercontinental Championship	5:28
8	Ken Shamrock defeated Shawn Michaels (c) (with Triple H and Chyna) by disqualification	Singles match for the WWF Championship	18:27
(c) / – the champion(s) heading into the match

=== Inaugural WWF Light Heavyweight Championship tournament ===
Quarterfinals; Raw Is War; November 3–24, 1997
Águila	Pinfall
Super Loco	5:12
Taka Michinoku	Pinfall
Devon Storm	5:00
Scott Taylor	Pinfall (Note: Aired on November 17.)
Eric Shelley	5:27
Brian Christopher	Pinfall
Flash Flanagan	3:30

Semifinals; Raw Is War; November 25, 1997 (Aired: December 1)
Águila	6:19
Taka Michinoku	Pinfall
Scott Taylor	—
Brian Christopher	Forfeit (Note: Christopher won by forfeit after Kane chokeslammed Taylor before his entrance, leaving Taylor unable to compete.)

Final; D-Generation X: In Your House; December 7, 1997
Taka Michinoku	Pinfall
Brian Christopher	12:00
