= Montreal Screwjob =

1997 professional wrestling incident

- Earl Hebner calls for the bell as Shawn Michaels holds Bret Hart in the Sharpshooter.
- Date: November 9, 1997
- Venue: Molson Centre, Montreal, Quebec, Canada
- Event: 1997 Survivor Series

Kayfabe
| Wrestler | | Bret Hart | Shawn Michaels |
| Billed from | | Calgary, Alberta, Canada | San Antonio, Texas, U.S. |
| Height | | 6 feet 0 inches (1.83 m) | 6 feet 1 inch (1.85 m) |
| Weight | | 235 pounds (107 kg) | 227 pounds (103 kg) |

Working
| Performer | | Bret Hart | Michael Hickenbottom |
- Booker(s): Vince McMahon, Gerald Brisco
- Promotion(s): World Wrestling Federation (WWF)
- Position: Main event
- Stipulation(s): Singles match for the WWF Championship
- Referee: Earl Hebner
- Incident(s): McMahon ordered Hebner to end the match, without Hart's knowledge and despite Hart not submitting.

Result
- Shawn Michaels defeated Bret Hart (submission, 19:58).

The Montreal Screwjob, also called the Montreal Incident, was a notorious professional wrestling incident where the outcome of a major match was changed, without one of the wrestlers being informed, in order to "screw over" Bret Hart, who was in bitter conflict with his then-employer, WWF (Now WWE) owner Vince McMahon. The screwjob occurred on November 9, 1997, at the Survivor Series PPV event produced by the WWF in Montreal, Quebec, Canada. During the WWF Championship match between champion Hart and Shawn Michaels, McMahon, who was in charge of matches and storylines and producer of the show – and a small number of WWF employees, most significantly referee Earl Hebner – covertly changed the predetermined outcome of the match in favor of Michaels; the screwjob occurred without Hart's knowledge, causing him to lose the championship. Hart took the incident as a personal insult because he did not wish to lose the title to Michaels after the latter had told Hart that he would never do the same for him. With this event, the term "screwjob" came into wrestling parlance.

Hart had been WWF Champion since SummerSlam 1997. A week prior to Survivor Series, Hart, who had performed for the WWF since 1984, agreed to join rival wrestling promotion WCW in December 1997. McMahon sought to prevent Hart from leaving the WWF as champion; Hart was unwilling to lose to Michaels – with whom he had a legitimate feud following a series of adversarial confrontations and verbal exchanges. The match was originally planned to end in disqualification, causing Hart to retain the title, and then losing or forfeiting it at a later date. Instead, as the match approached the twentieth minute (a standard length for a televised WWF title match), under McMahon's direction, Hebner ended the contest as Michaels held Hart in the Sharpshooter (a submission hold and Hart's signature move); although Hart did not submit, Michaels was declared the winner by submission and became WWF Champion. Michaels and other WWF officials left the arena in a scramble, after which there were several altercations backstage involving the pair and a number of other wrestlers and staff, including McMahon being punched in the face and knocked unconscious by Hart.

As a result of the Montreal Screwjob, McMahon and Michaels elicited angry responses from Canadian audiences and others for many years, with McMahon viewed by many fans to have betrayed Hart, who was one of the WWF's longest-tenured and most popular performers at the time. The incident is considered one of the beginnings of the WWF's Attitude Era, and unintentionally led to the creation of McMahon's villainous (heel) on-screen character, "Mr. McMahon", on WWF television broadcasts. The screwjob garnered a notorious legacy; accounts differ as to who exactly was involved in the plan and the extent of their involvement, while some wrestling fans, performers and bookers believe the incident was an elaborate work executed in collaboration with Hart, which he denies. Hart did not return to the promotion until his induction into the WWE Hall of Fame in April 2006. Later legitimately reconciling with McMahon and Michaels, Hart returned in January 2010 for his first live appearance on WWE programming since the incident, with the screwjob used in a storyline between McMahon and Hart, leading to a match at WrestleMania XXVI. Longtime industry writer Mike Johnson referred to the screwjob as "arguably the most talked-about [event] in the history of professional wrestling". The incident was partly chronicled in the documentary film Hitman Hart: Wrestling with Shadows (1998).

== Bret Hart's departure from the WWF ==
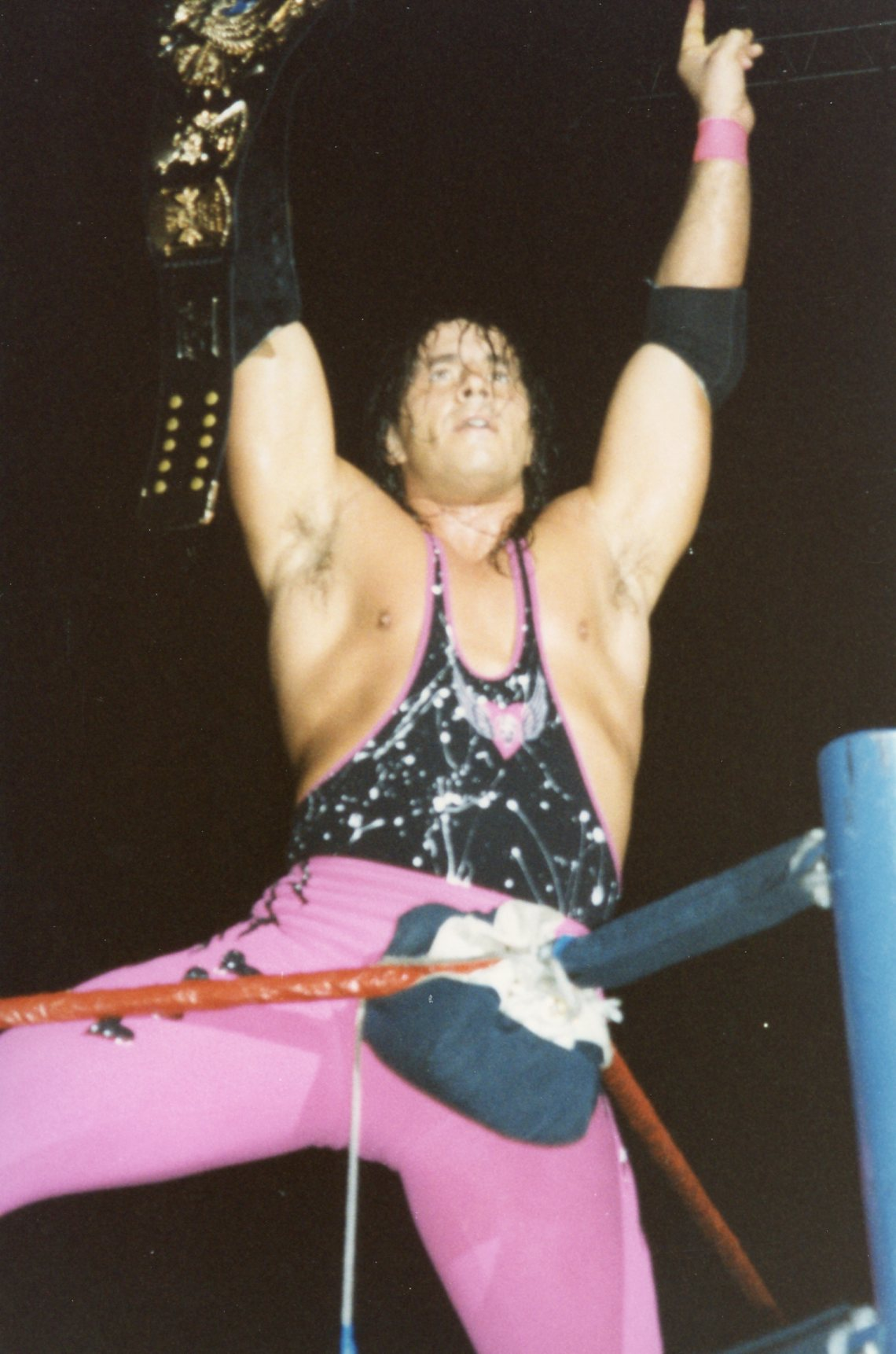
Bret Hart

At the time of the Montreal Screwjob, Bret Hart was a 14-year veteran of the WWF (now WWE), having got his first break in the promotion in the 1980s as one-half of The Hart Foundation, a tag team with his brother-in-law Jim Neidhart and manager Jimmy Hart (no relation). After the team had two reigns as the WWF Tag Team Champions – splitting from Jimmy Hart and becoming heroes between reigns – Hart then achieved tremendous success as a singles performer in the 1990s, twice taking the WWF Intercontinental Championship, and then winning the WWF Championship five times.

Between his third and fourth reigns, Hart took a seven-month leave of absence after WrestleMania XII, during which he considered contract offers from both the WWF and rival promotion WCW. In October 1996, Hart declined a three-year, $8.4 million offer from WCW, instead opting to sign an unprecedented twenty-year deal offered by WWF owner Vince McMahon, who promised to make him the highest-paid wrestler in the promotion and secure him a major role with the company's management following his retirement. Both Hart and the WWF saw the contract as an expression of mutual loyalty. By mid-1997, the WWF was facing financial difficulties due to stiff competition from WCW, which had become the largest professional wrestling promotion in the USA. At the same time, McMahon was planning an initial public offering to make the WWF a publicly traded company (even though the promotion would not go public until 1999), a move which required him to minimize any long-term financial commitments.

For several months prior to the 1997 Survivor Series, Hart and fellow wrestler Shawn Michaels had several backstage arguments, culminating in a fight before a WWF Raw event in Hartford, Connecticut, after Michaels had publicly accused Hart of having an affair with WWF valet Tammy Lynn Sytch, that saw Michaels go home for two months. On October 12, 1997, after a show in San Jose, California, Hart claimed he spoke to Michaels about being professional and trusting one another in the ring; Hart allegedly said he would have no problem losing to Michaels if McMahon requested. He also claimed that when Michaels replied that he "would not be willing to do the same" to him, Hart was shocked and became angry. This led to Hart's outright refusal to lose the WWF Championship to Michaels at the WWF's PPV event in Montreal, although in his documentary Hitman Hart: Wrestling with Shadows (1998), Hart stated to McMahon that he would happily drop the championship belt but not in Canada. In his own autobiography, Michaels rejected Hart's claim, saying that he would have cleanly lost to Hart had storylines demanded so; others, including Jim Cornette in various shoot interviews, often denied this, saying that they knew first-hand that Michaels had no intention of losing cleanly to Hart. Michaels also observed that he had lost cleanly to Hart several times in the past, most notably in the WWF's first ever ladder match at a Wrestling Challenge taping on July 21, 1992, which would subsequently be made available on multiple home video releases by the WWF, and in the main event of the 1992 Survivor Series. Michaels also lost to Hart in a steel cage match in December 1993.

"For some reason in the UK, Germany, Austria, Switzerland, Italy, and all the other markets that we had in those days, I had a completely different reaction from the fans in North America. I was well received in Canada and the United States but it was so much bigger over here [in Europe]."

— Bret Hart

McMahon believed he made the right choice in pressing Hart to return to the WWF, which kept him from joining WCW in 1996. By September 22, 1997, the promotion's monetary problems were at an all-time high. McMahon began deferring payments to Hart, claiming the company was in "financial peril". Meanwhile, McMahon reviewed the WWF's plans for the future and saw the likes of Stone Cold Steve Austin, The Undertaker, and D-Generation X (DX) leading what was to become the "Attitude Era". The WWF's plans did not include Hart; McMahon therefore encouraged Hart to reopen negotiations with WCW. While Hart considered an offer from then-WCW President Eric Bischoff, McMahon informed Hart that the WWF would honor his contract if he chose to stay. When Hart spoke with McMahon about future plans and storylines, he was disappointed by McMahon's response and by what he considered lackluster suggestions. At the time, Hart felt as though his career had been sabotaged by changes to his character, which had been retooled as an anti-American Canadian nationalist; as a result, he drew significant ire from U.S. audiences but remained a hero in his native Canada, as well as throughout Europe, with Hart himself stating that young fans in Germany liked his pink and black outfit and saw him as the right kind of hero.

Hart was neither a hero nor a villain, and as such could not be properly placed into feuds with other wrestlers with more concrete personas. He had been unhappy about McMahon's move towards more controversial subject matter, which would become a staple of the WWF's product during the Attitude Era. Convinced that McMahon's future plans did not include him, Hart resigned from the WWF and signed an agreement with WCW, which had just offered him a large $3 million per annum contract on November 1, 1997. Hart's signing this deal caused McMahon to worry about the possibility of Hart entering WCW while still the WWF Champion. Hart asked McMahon if he would be mocked after leaving for WCW, as had occurred with other WWF wrestlers who had transferred to the rival promotion (for example, Hulk Hogan and Randy Savage going by the names of "The Huckster" and "The Nacho Man" respectively in the "Billionaire Ted" sketches of early 1996, as well as having Rick Bognar and Glenn Jacobs portray the characters of Razor Ramon and Diesel, respectively, characters that were made famous by both Scott Hall and Kevin Nash respectively before they joined WCW later in 1996). McMahon assured him that nothing of the sort would happen. Despite this, on the night after the Montreal Screwjob on Monday Night Raw, the DX performed a segment mockingly re-enacting the match between Michaels and Hart, with a dwarf dressed as the latter.

== Title transition ==
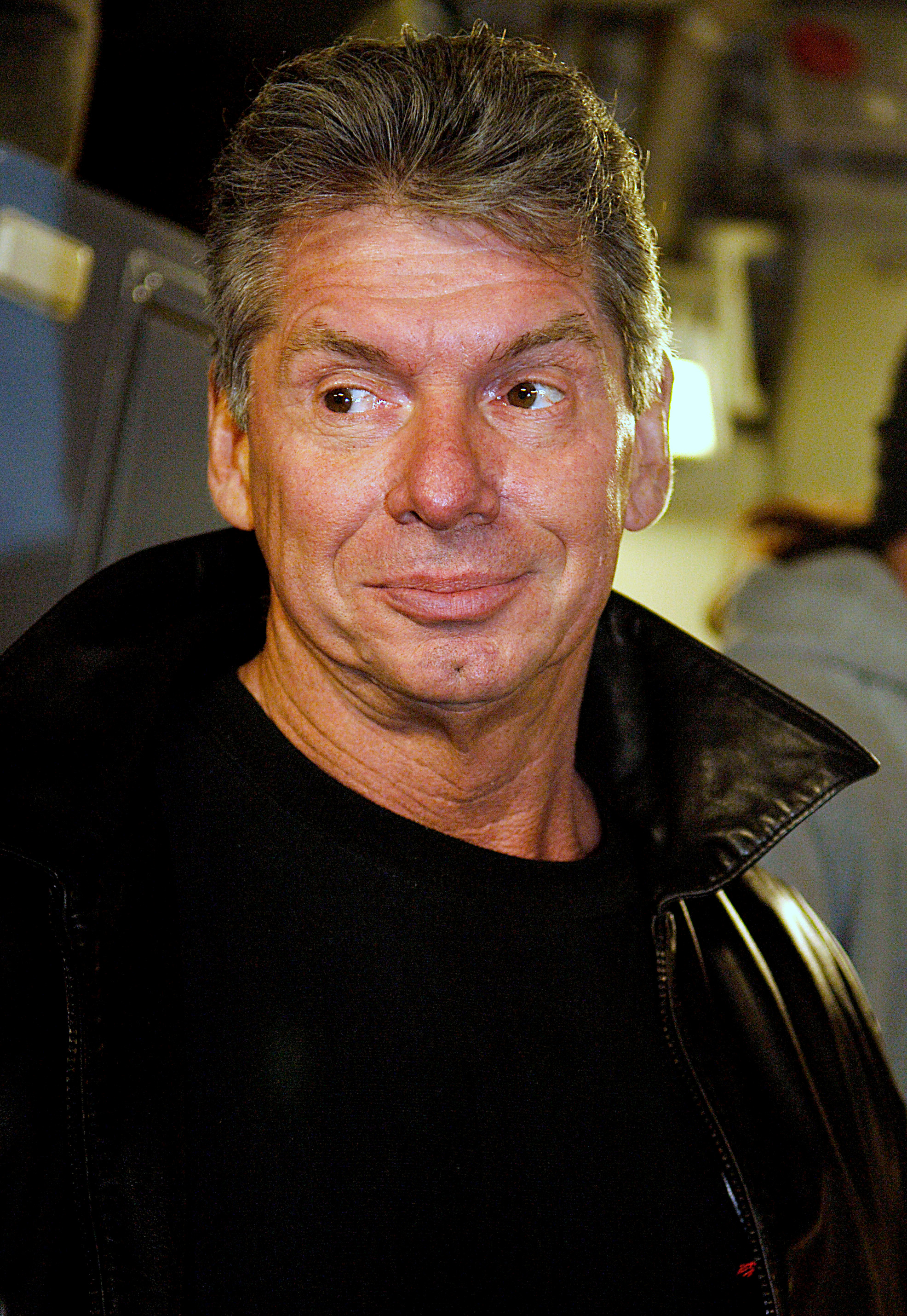
Vince McMahon

Hart's imminent move to WCW created a tense situation, as he had won the WWF Championship at SummerSlam 1997 from The Undertaker, which had featured Michaels as a special guest referee. The finish of the match saw Hart spit in Michaels' face, followed by Michaels swinging a steel chair towards Hart, who ducked, and the chair striking down The Undertaker. Hart would cover The Undertaker, and Michaels would reluctantly perform the three-count. Hart's WCW contract was scheduled to begin on December 5, one month after the 1997 Survivor Series, which was to be held in Montreal.

Michaels, the leader of the emerging DX stable, had been booked into a main event title match with Hart at that show. McMahon, anxious for Hart to give up the title, sought his consent to job to Michaels. Hart refused to give up the title to a member of The Kliq (a group that included Michaels, Hall, Nash, Triple H, and Sean Waltman and that had previously held enormous backstage influence), apparently standing up for the rest of the locker room. As part of their rivalry storyline, Michaels repeatedly performed acts insulting to Canadian fans and the Canadian flag, which also upset Hart. Wrestling fans also knew of Hart's long-standing legitimate feud with Michaels—Hart had been angered at Michaels' forfeiture of the WWF Championship in February 1997, ruining plans for a Hart–Michaels rematch at WrestleMania 13, where Michaels was expected to lose the title to Hart.

Hart believed that Michaels had faked a knee injury and talked about major surgery just to get out of their planned match. While Michaels denied rumors that he did not want to lose to Hart, and indeed Hart wound up winning the title shortly after Michaels relinquished it, Hart felt certain that Michaels would not have offered a loss in return if he had been staying with the WWF. The two had been involved in a real altercation after Michaels implied that Hart had been having an affair with Sytch. The recent storyline rivalry had also seen Michaels make insulting remarks about Hart's father Stu, which had left Hart and other members of the Hart family upset. McMahon's offering of an estimated $3 million contract to Hart in 1996 had reportedly also upset Michaels.

McMahon remained insistent that Hart drop the title, anxious about the prospect of Hart pulling a move similar to that of former WWF employee Debrah Miceli. Miceli, a veteran women's wrestler who competed under the name Madusa for much of her career, performed as Alundra Blayze in the WWF from 1993 to 1995 and won the WWF Women's Championship during her stay there. McMahon had neglected to renew her contract when it expired, and Miceli signed with WCW while still Women's Champion. When she made her first appearance on WCW Monday Nitro, Madusa made fun of her time in the WWF and brought her title belt, which the WWF had neglected to take back, dumping it into a trash can during the live broadcast. McMahon feared a repeat of that incident, despite claims from Bischoff that legal issues between the WWF and WCW would prevent a recurrence, and that he would rather have Hart join WCW with a "clean slate". Hart continued to refuse to drop the title to Michaels, offering to lose the title anywhere in the U.S. prior to Survivor Series or to surrender the title to McMahon on the episode of Raw immediately following Survivor Series, scheduled to be taped in Ottawa.

After several disagreements, McMahon, Michaels and Hart agreed to a proposal of a disqualification finish, which would be the result of a brawl between Hart's allies (Neidhart, Hart's brother Owen and Davey Boy Smith) with Michaels' allies (Triple H and Chyna), after the latter group interfered in the match to aid Michaels. Hart would then lose or forfeit the title at a later date, as he was not due to start in WCW until December. Hart also asked for and obtained McMahon's permission to explain his actions, his heel character, and to praise McMahon and the WWF, thus leaving on good terms with the company and the fans. At some point in the days leading up to Survivor Series, however, McMahon began to reconsider that decision. Word of Hart's impending departure from the WWF had leaked to fans and wrestling news sources. McMahon was worried that allowing Hart to remain champion after Survivor Series would cause problems and suspected Bischoff, in another effort to humiliate the WWF, would mention WCW's signing of Hart on Nitro the following night (something Bischoff later said would not have happened under normal circumstances). Furthermore, Bischoff would have a one-hour head start on McMahon due to Nitro going on the air live at 8:00 p.m., which would have been more than enough time to announce Hart's arrival at WCW. Therefore, McMahon felt, he needed to find a way to preemptively strip Hart of the title.

== Setup and execution ==
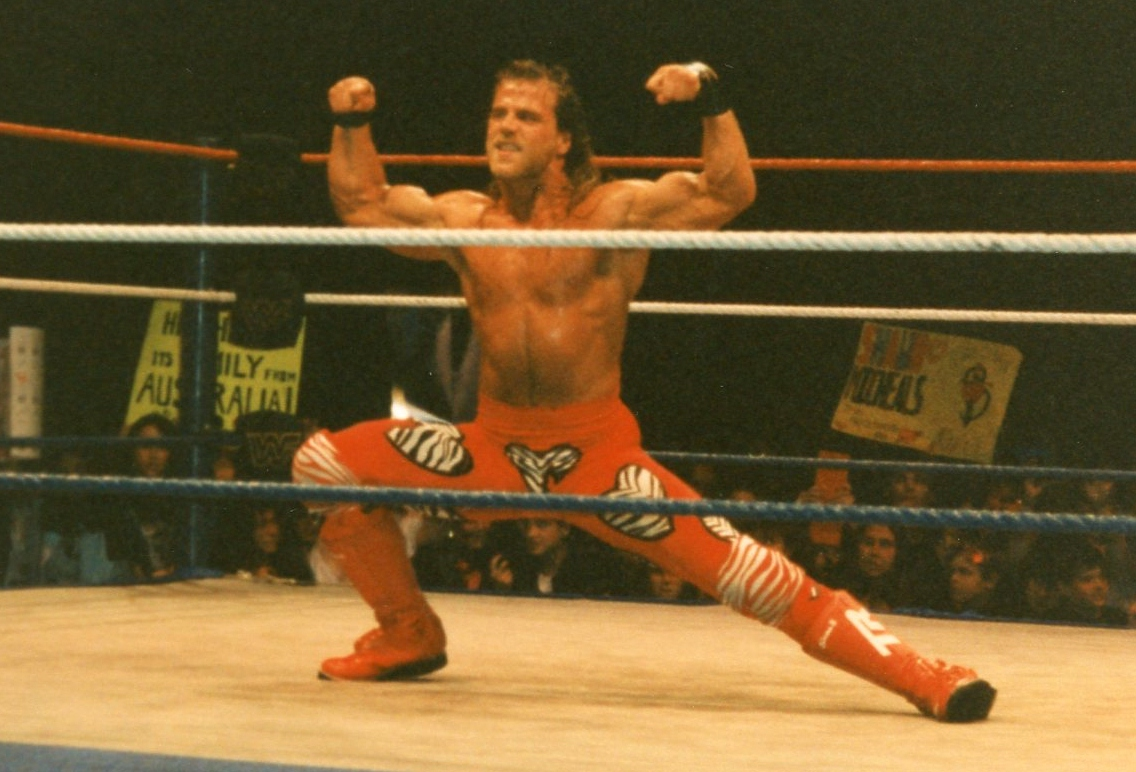
Shawn Michaels

On November 8, 1997, one day before Survivor Series, McMahon met with Michaels and Pat Patterson in a hotel room in Montreal and planned the screwjob. It is unclear how many people knew of the impending betrayal; McMahon's close aide, Gerald Brisco, was involved in the planning. Jim Ross later insisted he did not know the screwjob would take place, although many, including various members of the Hart family, thought otherwise. Ross stated that Jerry Lawler also did not know about the screwjob beforehand. Hart and Michaels had previously met with Patterson to discuss the match setup and plan, during which Hart agreed to allow Michaels to put him into the Sharpshooter, Hart's signature submission hold, at a time when the referee would be unconscious, as Patterson suggested.

The rest of the match was planned to proceed thus: Hart would grab Michaels's foot and reverse the hold, putting him in the Sharpshooter. Michaels would submit to the hold; however, the referee would still be unconscious. Hart would let go of the hold to try to revive the referee, and Michaels would hit Hart with his finisher, Sweet Chin Music, and make the pin. A second referee would then run to the ring with Owen Hart, Jim Neidhart, and Davey Boy Smith following close behind. The second referee would start the count, only for Owen and Smith to break the pin. The original referee would then recover and start to make the count, with Hart kicking out and setting up about five more minutes of brawling that would result in a disqualification. Per a longstanding rule that titles could only change hands via pinfall or submission, Hart would remain champion. In his documentary Hitman Hart, Hart said that his fears were largely assuaged because he was close friends with referee Earl Hebner and trusted him implicitly. Asked by Hart, Hebner swore on his children's lives that he would never double-cross Hart and would rather quit his job than participate in a screwjob.

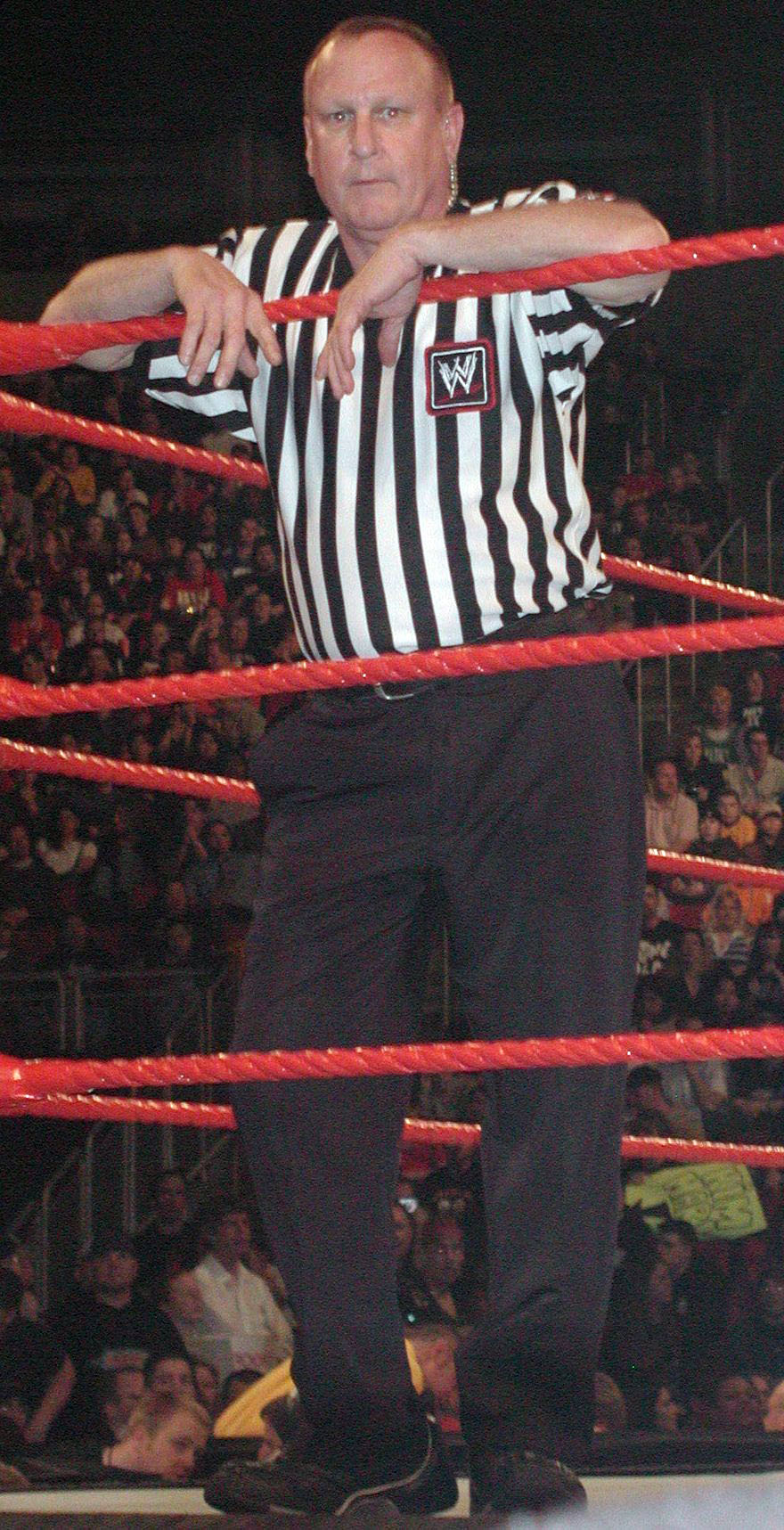
Earl Hebner

According to his autobiography, Michaels himself informed Hebner of the plan only on Sunday evening, just as Survivor Series was about to commence. This contradicted what Hebner said on a 2003 edition of WWE Confidential, claiming that he first knew of McMahon's plan only ten minutes before the match finished. Tensions and excitement were high as WWF wrestlers and officials congregated for Survivor Series. Hart was anxious over the match finish and had been warned of the prospect of a screwjob by Neidhart and Smith, as well as by Big Van Vader, who had experienced similar situations while wrestling in Japan. They advised Hart to be alert, not lie on his back for too long, kick out from pinfall counts immediately to avoid a fast count, and not allow himself to be placed in submission holds. The Molson Centre in Montreal was sold out, with more than 20,000 fans in attendance. Rumors of Hart's imminent departure from the WWF had leaked, consequently heightening fan interest in the match. The mixed signals and a war of words between Hart, Michaels, McMahon, and WCW further heightened anticipation.

Emotions were running high due to the Hart–Michaels rivalry and the "U.S. vs. Canada" storyline. While both men had been civil with each other backstage, WWF officials ordered the deployment of a large number of company agents around the ring as a precaution if Hart decided to attack Michaels or McMahon in reaction to the double-cross. Highly unusual for any wrestling match, the deployment was explained on television as a necessary precaution in the wake of the intense animosity between Hart's and Michaels' characters. There was also some legitimate concern that Michaels could be attacked during the planned in-crowd brawl by fans angered at his actions of demeaning the Canadian flag. Michaels' entrance was greeted by loud booing, and upon entering the ring, he proceeded to rub the Canadian flag against his crotch, picked his nose with it, and later humped it—Michaels maintains that this flag desecration was suggested by Hart as an effective way to draw heat. The palpable anger of the fans was converted into raucous cheering as Hart entered the ring carrying the Canadian flag and wearing the championship belt. He was visibly disturbed when segments of the crowd, aware of his move to WCW, jeered him with chants of "You sold out!" as the match progressed.

Once the match began, Hart and Michaels brought their performance outside the ring and into the crowd, while being followed by McMahon and WWF officials. As the climax of the match approached, the two wrestlers returned to the ring while officials continued to order more personnel to the ringside. Hart's suspicions were first aroused upon noticing that McMahon was not at the announcers' table to perform commentary, and that on-screen commissioner Sgt. Slaughter was also standing at the ringside with McMahon. Nevertheless, the match continued. As planned, Michaels pushed Hebner in front of him as Hart jumped from the top turnbuckle, sending all three men to the canvas. Michaels and Hart both got up, and Michaels performed a rake on Hart's eye, sending Hart back to the mat. Michaels then grabbed Hart's legs to execute the Sharpshooter maneuver. At this point, the match director was heard shouting instructions into his headset for Hebner to get up; Hart did not notice anything amiss. Mike Chioda, the referee who was supposed to run in after Hebner went down, began yelling back that Hebner was not supposed to be up yet. Patterson reacted similarly, and Owen and Smith, who were waiting for their cues to run in, remained backstage in a state of confusion. Michaels was then seen by many viewers as having glanced at Hebner as he put Hart in the Sharpshooter, which some saw as proof that Hebner was in on the scheme.

Contrary to their agreed plan, Michaels tightened his hold and refused to offer his leg to Hart so Hart could break free. At that moment, Hebner got to his feet, looked toward timekeeper Mark Yeaton, and shouted, "Ring the bell!" McMahon then elbowed Yeaton hard and yelled, "Ring the fucking bell!" Yeaton rang the bell just as Hart reached forward and grabbed Michaels's leg, which broke the hold and caused Michaels to fall. According to Hart, while he was trying to trip Michaels' knee, he heard McMahon say, "Ring the bell!" and realized what had happened right after the referee rang the bell. Michaels' theme music then began playing as the ring announcer declared him the winner and the new WWF Champion. Hebner had already exited the ring and was on his way out of the arena, and would lock himself in his hotel room for the remainder of the night. Ross can be heard on commentary asking, "What happened?" A moment later, he says, "Bret Hart gave up in the Sharpshooter."

After an initial moment of shock, Hart got to his feet, approached the apron where McMahon was standing and spat directly in his face, while Michaels feigned confusion. Michaels was ordered by McMahon to "pick up the damn belt and get the hell out of here!" Michaels left the arena with Brisco and Triple H, and the broadcast signal cut off almost immediately after Michaels exited, with the last shot being a tight closeup of the Survivor Series logo above the entranceway. McMahon and most other WWF officials also quickly made their way backstage as an angry Hart smashed cameras, monitors, and ringside equipment. Fans in attendance also began to vent their fury on McMahon and WWF officials; a few even heaped trash on them, and some who were close enough pushed Michaels as he hurried backstage. Owen, Neidhart, and Smith came out to the ring and spoke with Hart, calming him down. Hart proceeded to finger trace "W-C-W" and "I love you" to the cheering fans before returning backstage.

== Reactions ==
While much of the live audience in Montreal immediately understood what had happened and responded angrily, TV viewers were left confused as Ross promptly wrapped up the event during commentary. Survivor Series went off the air four minutes ahead of schedule with the parting image of Michaels holding the belt aloft as he disappeared backstage. Rumors and expressions of surprise and shock pervaded the Internet almost immediately after the match ended. Some observers considered it a creative and all-time match finish. Observers of professional wrestling speculated whether the entire episode would result in WCW becoming the dominant promotion in Canada, where a large majority of fans had remained loyal to the WWF, especially as the Hart family was working with the company.

In the aftermath of the screwjob, wrestlers backstage were in an uproar. Hart proceeded to the dressing rooms and questioned Michaels, who insisted he knew nothing about what had taken place and was equally outraged. McMahon locked himself in his office with Patterson and other agents. Mark Calaway, the wrestler known as The Undertaker, screened the match in McMahon's office and visited Hart's dressing room to express his shock. Furious with McMahon, Calaway went back to McMahon's office and banged on the door. McMahon opened and was told by Calaway he had to apologize to Hart. Recounted in Michaels' autobiography, McMahon told him not to say anything about the screwjob to anybody, because McMahon needed to have everyone think that it was only him involved. Michaels offered his assurance that he would not carry the title belt out the next day on Raw and would refuse to say anything derogatory about Hart. Hart states in his autobiography that Calaway and many wrestlers in the locker room supported him, almost to the point of mutiny against McMahon.

Hart proceeded to his dressing room to shower and change after discovering that McMahon, Brisco, and Slaughter had locked themselves in McMahon's office. He had Owen and Smith in the dressing room with him. McMahon came into the dressing room with his son Shane as well as Brisco, Patterson, and Bruce Prichard. Everybody sat down, with McMahon on one side and Hart on the other. Calaway, who came back with McMahon, took Michaels to the far end of the dressing room and sat next to him, knowing he was eventually going to chime in, and that was not going to help the situation. Along with this, throughout the aftermath, Calaway did not let anyone who was not affected or involved in the dressing room. McMahon and Hart started talking back and forth, with McMahon trying to explain his position and Hart giving his thoughts on what he thought about McMahon and what he did.

Hart angrily rebuffed McMahon, warning him to leave the dressing room immediately or risk being punched. McMahon refused and said, "I'm gonna give you one". An altercation ensued, with Hart throwing a right hand and hitting McMahon in the temple, dropping him to the floor. Although Shane and Brisco briefly struggled with Hart and Smith, Hart told them to take McMahon and leave, or risk similar consequences. When Hart angrily asked McMahon if he was going to screw him on the pay he was still owed, a groggy McMahon replied in the negative. McMahon sported a black eye and a sprained ankle after the incident, which according to Hart was a result of his punch lifting McMahon off the floor and rolling his ankle once he landed; however, McMahon and Brisco later stated on WWE Confidential that Brisco accidentally stepped on McMahon's foot, which as he tried to get back to his feet, immediately sprained his ankle and sent him back to the floor, from which he suffered a concussion, and referred to Brisco's action as a "comedy". In the hallway outside the dressing rooms, Hart's then-wife Julie angrily confronted Triple H and others about the finish but was escorted away by Owen. Triple H and Michaels were later confronted and assailed by angry fans outside the Molson Centre and in the lobby of their hotel.

While Owen, Neidhart, and Smith had flown out of Montreal with Hart, McMahon faced a major revolt in the locker room. Most wrestlers were angered by the screwjob and threatened to boycott Raw or leave the WWF altogether. McMahon addressed a meeting to mollify the wrestlers, who had been outraged that McMahon had double-crossed a WWF veteran—many feared for their future and were suspicious of McMahon. McMahon sought to explain that Hart had been disregarding the WWF's interests by refusing to drop the title in Montreal, claiming he was jeopardizing the company's future by creating a potentially embarrassing situation that could affect its fortunes. The potential revolt was also quelled by Hart's counsel to the wrestlers who asked him about boycotting Raw or leaving the WWF. Hart advised them to fulfill their contractual obligations and not risk their future over the episode. In protest, Mick Foley did not attend the next night's Raw show but returned to work afterward due to a phone call from Cornette, as well as his contract stipulations.

Hart later commented in his autobiography that if Foley returned to WCW, he would be committing career suicide. Hart's friend Rick Rude, who was briefly working as a storyline manager for Michaels at the time, called WCW and informed Bischoff of what had transpired, and returned to WCW two days after the screwjob out of disgust over Hart's treatment. Rude appeared on both Raw and Nitro on November 17, 1997. A mustached Rude appeared on Nitro, which was live, and proceeded to criticize Michaels, DX and the WWF, calling the company "the Titanic" (a reference to Titan Enterprises, as the WWF's parent company was then known, as the "sinking ship"). An hour later on Raw (which had been taped six days earlier), Rude appeared with the full beard he had been sporting during his last few weeks in the WWF. Of the Hart family, only Owen continued to work with the company, being unable to terminate his contract.

At the next night's Raw in Ottawa, Michaels appeared carrying the WWF title belt and performed a segment where he boasted to the audience about how he had beaten Hart with his trademark move in his own country. McMahon gave a television interview to Ross, explaining his version of events and making the now-infamous statement, "Vince McMahon didn't screw Bret Hart. I truly believe that Bret Hart... screwed Bret Hart." Michaels continued his mocking of Hart in the coming weeks, performing a skit badgering a dwarf dressed up as Hart. As McMahon expected, WCW did address Hart and the aftermath of the screwjob on Nitro from the Mid-South Coliseum in Memphis that same night. Mike Tenay and Tony Schiavone strongly criticized McMahon and Michaels for their actions, and Bischoff made references to Hart's impending arrival at WCW and his punching McMahon in the face. Bischoff then used his on-air persona as the mouthpiece for the New World Order (nWo) to claim (kayfabe) that Hart was to join the nWo as soon as he could be signed to WCW. Nash, Hall, Hollywood Hogan, and the rest of the nWo members stood with Canadian flags and sang the Canadian national anthem.

WCW invoked the screwjob again at Starrcade 1997, as Hart prevented Hogan from leaving with the WCW World Heavyweight Championship. He claimed that the referee Nick Patrick gave a fast count and that he would not allow Sting to be screwed, although Patrick seemingly did not. The result was what critics called an anti-climax as most had expected Sting to win cleanly on skill alone. At Starrcade 1999, the finish of the match between Hart and Bill Goldberg was for guest referee Roddy Piper to "ring the bell" once Hart placed Goldberg in the Sharpshooter despite Goldberg not submitting.

== Legacy ==
The Montreal Screwjob remains one of the most high-profile double-crosses in the history of professional wrestling, and the first heavily publicized professional wrestling double-cross since Wendi Richter lost the WWF Women's Championship to a masked Fabulous Moolah following a money dispute on November 25, 1985. It is perhaps the most controversial match in the history of the WWF, with the effects of its outcome being felt for over a decade later due to its notoriety and the infamous legacy it left in the promotion. Hart was ostracized by McMahon and later refused offers of induction to the WWE Hall of Fame. The documentary Hitman Hart included footage of McMahon's conversations with Hart in which he affirmed the planned disqualification finish and expressed determination for Hart to exit "the right way" and as amicably as possible—McMahon did not know that the conversation was being recorded. In the recordings, Hart refused to drop the title to Michaels.

The screwjob's impact defined later storylines and rivalries. The WWF successfully tapped fan outrage at McMahon over the incident by creating the persona of "Mr. McMahon"—an authoritarian and arrogant heel boss who imposed his own will and authority on rebellious characters such as Stone Cold Steve Austin. Within the storylines, McMahon "screwed" such wrestlers in order to hand the title to the performer of his choice. The "Bret screwed Bret" line inspired promos that McMahon made during his feud with Austin. At Unforgiven: In Your House pay-per-view event, McMahon sat at ringside, placed strategically near the timekeeper, during Austin's title defense against Dude Love (Mick Foley), which caused Austin to allude to the screwjob during a promotional interview. At the 1998 Survivor Series—the first anniversary of the screwjob—Shane, a match referee, abandoned his on-screen rebellion against his father and allowed McMahon to screw Austin, by refusing to count Austin's pinfall against Mankind (one of Foley's three characters). The McMahons then double-crossed Mankind in his main event WWF Championship match against The Rock later that night. Just as The Rock put the Sharpshooter hold on Mankind, McMahon called for the bell to be rung, even though Mankind did not submit. The Rock was declared the winner by submission and the new WWF Champion, fully re-enacting the Hart double-cross, this time with a switch between the respective face and heel characters.

Since then, professional wrestling storylines, including some storylines written by WWE, continue to refer to the screwjob whenever a title match ends under controversial circumstances. In addition to the 1998 Survivor Series, a worked screwjob was recreated by Theodore Long (the then-general manager of WWE SmackDown) in favour of CM Punk (the then World Heavyweight Champion) against The Undertaker at Breaking Point 2009 and an attempt against Punk (who won and walked out of the arena and WWE with the WWE Championship as part of the storyline) by McMahon himself (with the help of John Laurinaitis) was thwarted by the then WWE Champion John Cena at Money in the Bank 2011. In January 2010, the reenactments of the incident even extended to Total Nonstop Action Wrestling (TNA) when Hebner ended a main event match between Kurt Angle and AJ Styles by quickly ringing the bell when Styles used the ankle lock on Angle, despite the fact that Angle had not attempted to submit. This led Angle to react in a way very similar to Hart's. The next week, Hebner admitted to a disappointed Hogan that he had taken a payoff from Ric Flair for the action, prompting Hogan to temporarily suspend him. In the video game WWE 13, one of the playable matches on the single player campaign allows players to recreate the Montreal Screwjob.

== Resolution ==
The WWF eventually surpassed its arch-rival WCW. With its business steadily declining and its parent company, Time Warner, being acquired by America Online, WCW was put up for sale and purchased by McMahon in 2001, once again making the WWF the single-largest wrestling company in North America. Hart's entry into WCW had been hailed at the time as a major coup for the company, but it subsequently failed to capitalize on his popular appeal. Hart's active wrestling career ended in 2000 after he suffered a severe concussion during a match with Goldberg. After dropping the WWF title to Austin at WrestleMania XIV in 1998, Michaels was forced into retirement for four years due to a serious back injury. After a long period of rehabilitation, Michaels returned to the ring in 2002 at SummerSlam, and eventually retired in 2010 at WrestleMania XXVI, losing to The Undertaker in the main event, but came out of retirement for one match eight years later at Crown Jewel in 2018.

After weeks of speculation, WWE.com announced in late August 2005 that Hart and WWE had agreed to collaborate on a DVD project chronicling Hart's wrestling career. In subsequent interviews, Hart attributed his decision to his desire to be remembered for his storied career that spanned two decades. The project, which had been given the working title of Screwed: The Bret Hart Story, was renamed Bret "Hit Man" Hart: The Best There Is, the Best There Was, the Best There Ever Will Be. In the 2005 DVD chronicling his career, both Hart and Bischoff denied that the former's holding the WWF title was a factor in WCW's desire to sign him. While McMahon claimed mutual regret, Hart defended his actions, asserting he stood by what he had done. Hart was interviewed about the DVD and his career by Todd Grisham on the November 16, 2005, edition of Byte This!, marking Hart's first appearance on WWE programming since the screwjob.

Hart's refusal to lose to Michaels in Montreal was criticized by others such as Flair, who asserted that it was Hart's responsibility to drop the title belt of a company he was leaving; Flair himself was WCW World Heavyweight Champion when he left the company and signed with the WWF in 1991, even appearing on television with the NWA/WCW belt, but also dropped the WWF Championship to Hart at a Saskatoon house show on October 12, 1992. However, Hart maintains that he was prepared to lose the title anywhere and to anyone, except to Michaels in Canada, given that, during 1997, his "Hitman" character had been built up as a great Canadian hero. As his contract with the WWF did not expire for four more weeks, Hart asserts that there was plenty of time and several other opportunities for him to drop the title. Several accounts claim that McMahon had initially proposed that Hart drop the title at December's In Your House pay-per-view in Springfield, Massachusetts, which became D-Generation X: In Your House, or at January's Royal Rumble in San Jose, California.

Although Michaels expressed happiness at Hart's 2006 induction into the WWE Hall of Fame, the Hart–Michaels relationship remained laced with antagonism. Michaels criticized Hart's behavior and conduct his 2005 autobiography, comparing the screwjob to a "mafia hit", and Hart stated in his 2007 autobiography that he would "never forgive" Michaels. In interviews before the induction ceremony, Hart asserted that he would walk out of the ceremony if he saw Michaels; Michaels decided to step out of view to avoid a possible scene. Hart did not appear at the WrestleMania 22 show in a mini-ceremony with the other inductees, later explaining that he had never intended to attend or appear at the show. Hart would later return to WWE television on the June 11, 2007, episode of Raw, where he appeared in a taped promo spot mocking Mr. McMahon's "appreciation night". While he was able to reconcile to a degree with McMahon, Hart had never reconciled with Michaels. In a November 17, 2008, radio interview, Hart mocked Michaels's version of the incident, saying, "Shawn's this Christian today; and in his book, he wrote that Vince took a dive and that I never even hit him and I thought, 'This guy is such a liar'. I wonder what kind of Christian he is." Asked if he had seen or spoken to Michaels since 1997, Hart said, "No. And I hope I never do... for his sake."

In 2009, Hart stated in an interview with Sky Sports that he would forgive Michaels if he had apologized first, saying, "For me, I don't really have much issue with it anymore. If you asked me that, up until probably about a year ago, I'd have probably said something different. But I've cooled off a bit now. I don't want to carry it around anymore. If he wanted to apologize, I would accept it. I'd move on, but I wouldn't forget it." He also put over the Michaels–Undertaker match at WrestleMania 25, saying he was proud of both men's efforts and that despite his personal feelings towards Michaels, he always had the utmost respect for his abilities. Similarly, Michaels commended Hart's abilities, calling him a "sheer joy" to work with in the ring.

=== Hart's WWE return ===
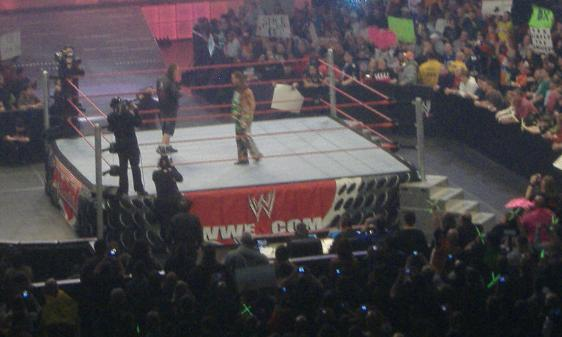
Hart and Michaels reconcile on the January 4, 2010, episode of Raw.

On December 14, 2009, during an episode of Raw, McMahon came out to announce the nominees for Guest Host of the Year at the Slammy Awards. After announcing Bob Barker as the recipient of the award, McMahon asked guest host Dennis Miller who he would like to see as a Raw guest host. Miller said he would like to see Hart, who was his long-time favorite. McMahon dismissed Miller's suggestion, reminding him that the last time Hart was in the WWE was when "Bret screwed Bret", and that he likely would have no interest in hosting the show. Miller then asked the audience if they would like to see Hart as a guest host, to which they responded with applause, and McMahon walked away. On December 16, Dave Meltzer of the Wrestling Observer Newsletter reported that Hart had signed a four-month contract with WWE, and would debut as the guest host of Raw on January 4, 2010. On December 28, WWE.com confirmed that McMahon would be at Raw that night to address the rumors about Hart hosting the show. That night, McMahon confirmed that Hart would be the guest host on the January 4 episode of Raw. A WWE.com article published shortly after the December 28 episode of Raw alluded to an "almost guaranteed encounter between the WWE Chairman and the Hit Man".

Hart returned on the January 4, 2010, episode of Raw, and promptly called out Michaels to bury the hatchet. Hart and Michaels then aired their grievances with one another while recognizing that their sixty-minute iron man match at WrestleMania XII ought to be the highlight of their relationship rather than the screwjob. The pair shook hands, and Michaels turned as if to deliver Sweet Chin Music, but instead chose to embrace Hart. While many cast doubts on the sincerity of their reconciliation, Hart confirmed that it was genuine, as did Michaels, and acknowledged that he felt that Michaels had changed for the better. Later in the night, a storyline between Hart and McMahon began with the two appearing to have their reconciliation, only to have McMahon subsequently kick Hart in the gut; in real life, Hart and McMahon had been on slight speaking terms since 2002, when McMahon called Hart during his recovery from a stroke. The feud culminated in an encounter at WrestleMania XXVI, which saw Hart defeat McMahon in a match that involved the Hart family. After the match, Hart would continue to periodically work televised events for WWE. Hart briefly held the WWE United States Championship in May 2010, a title he had held four times previously, all during his tenure in WCW. It was Hart's first championship reign in WWE since the Montreal Screwjob.

Hart appeared on the September 10, 2012, episode of Raw at the Bell Centre in Montreal, marking his return for the first time to the same building where the screwjob occurred, where he took part in an interview segment featuring John Cena and WWE Champion CM Punk, with Hart punching Punk. The episode was overshadowed by Jerry Lawler's real on-air heart attack earlier in the evening, from which he eventually made a full recovery. Hart also briefly appeared during the 2013 Royal Rumble, giving a pep talk to Alberto Del Rio before his Last Man Standing match for the World Heavyweight Championship with Big Show. On May 27, 2013, an episode of Raw, was named "Bret Hart Appreciation Night". Hart was pictured in the evening speaking to Cena, Kane and Daniel Bryan, among others. At the end of the show, Michaels and Lawler handed Hart a plaque commemorating his career. The following week, Hart took part in WWE Inbox, a web show held by WWE on its YouTube channel where he answered fans' Twitter questions.

== Discrepancies ==
=== Different accounts of proclaimed proponents of the event ===
In his 2005 autobiography Heartbreak and Triumph, Michaels stated that the Montreal Screwjob was his idea: "It was my turn to chime in. 'I'll do whatever you want. We'll just take it off him. I'll just swerve him or whatever I have to. You tell me what needs to get done. You and this company have put up with so much from me. My loyalty is here with you. I'll do whatever you want.' 'What are we talking about, Shawn?' 'Whatever it takes. If we have to do a fast count or get him in a hold and tell someone to ring the bell, I'll do whatever you want.'" The Sharpshooter spot had been suggested by Hart, with Michaels recalling, "We were talking things through, and Bret came up with this spot where I get him in the Sharpshooter and then he reverses it by pulling on my leg." Indirectly corroborating this assertion is Hart's own testimony in his autobiography Hitman, where he said "Pat Patterson told me that he thought it would be a heckuva spot to let Shawn put me in the Sharpshooter and then reverse it on him", which would indicate that Patterson had initially proposed the Sharpshooter spot to Bret. In the same work, Hart also stated, "I found myself jostling with Jerry Brisco, who I would find out later was the one who had designed the whole Screwjob for Vince."

Adding to this confusion, Vince Russo stated in his book Forgiven that it was he who proposed the match's ending to McMahon, '"Vince – we're making this way too difficult,' I said. 'Why don't we just do this? During the course of the match, let's have a spot where Shawn puts Bret in his own hold – the Sharpshooter. As soon as Shawn clamps it on, have the referee call for the bell as if Bret quit...'" In a 2010 YouShoot interview, Cornette told how he suggested to have Ken Shamrock "double-cross" Hart for the title – as Hart was reportedly willing to drop the belt to anyone except Michaels – therefore unwittingly introducing the concept of a screwjob to McMahon. During a meeting prior to the show, Triple H was the first person to suggest screwing Hart in the match. In Viceland's Dark Side of the Ring episode on the screwjob, Cornette stated he was the first person to specifically suggest the Sharpshooter spot to McMahon.

=== Involvement of referee Earl Hebner ===
In his book Heartbreak & Triumph, Michaels stated, "It was about seven o'clock when I walked into the locker room. There were only a few people in there, and none were close to Earl. He was putting on his referee gear, and I started putting on my boots. 'Earl, I need you to listen to me very carefully.' I was speaking very softly. 'We are doing a big swerve tonight. I am going to get Bret in the Sharpshooter, and I need you to ring the bell.'" Hebner stated that Brisco was the person to tell him of the plan. In an interview on Prichard's Something to Wrestle podcast, Brisco confirmed he told Hebner of the secret plan and pressured him into betraying Hart. Hebner was warned by Brisco that he was being microphoned and that, at any point, should Hebner alert Hart to the double-cross, he would be fired immediately.

=== Involvement of Pat Patterson ===
Michaels stated in Heartbreak & Triumph that during planning he was told, "This cannot be discussed with anyone. Pat can't know, nobody can know about this but the three of us right now", "We had the meeting, and as everyone was leaving, Vince asked me, Hunter, and Jerry Brisco, a longtime agent and close confidant of Vince's, to stay. We sat down and talked", and, "Pat was in the room with us, and he had no idea what was going to happen. He had a strong relationship with Bret. He wouldn't have done it, and Vince knew that. That's why he didn't tell Pat..."

In Dave Meltzer's online account of events before, during, and after the Screwjob, he stated, "Vince McMahon held a meeting at the hotel with Jim Ross, Jim Cornette, Pat Patterson, and Michaels. Reports are that at least two of the aforementioned names looked extremely uncomfortable leaving the meeting", which suggests that Patterson may in fact have been in on the screwjob. This is corroborated by a Pro Wrestling Torch article from November 15, 1997, by Wade Keller stating, "However, a two-hour meeting was held on the second floor of the Montreal Marriott on Saturday night with McMahon, Jim Ross, Pat Patterson, Jim Cornette, and Michaels. Bret was wrestling that night in Detroit. There is some belief that at this meeting, McMahon proposed the idea of the finish to whoever in that group wasn't already in on it. Ross and Patterson entered the meeting in a good mood, and when they were seen in the hotel lobby afterward, they were said to be irritable, forlorn, and shaken."

In addition, Hart stated in Hitman that, while conversing with Michaels, "I added, 'I also want you to know that I have no problem dropping the belt to you if that's what Vince wants.' He glared back at me. 'I appreciate that, but I want you to know that I'm not willing to do the same for you.' And then he left. Jim [Neidhart] snorted, 'I can't believe that he just said that.' There was no way I could ever drop the belt to him now: he'd just shown complete disrespect not only to me, but to the position of champion..." This exchange was confirmed in Meltzer's account, "During the meeting, Hart told Michaels that he'd be happy to put him over at the end of the run, but Michaels told Hart flat-out that he wouldn't return the favor. Michaels and Hart spoke again on the subject on 10/12 in San Jose, when once again Michaels told Hart that he wasn't going to do a job for him." In Forgiven, Russo stated, "Well – no surprise here – Bret refused to do the job (get pinned) for Shawn in Canada. Not because he was being unprofessional – but because, according to Bret, Michaels had said that he wouldn't do business with him (the right thing for the company in the ring), due to the way he felt about him."

=== Legitimacy ===
The Montreal Screwjob sparked a series of conspiracy theories. A fringe belief, espoused by several within the business, believes the screwjob was a work in which Hart acted in collaboration with McMahon. Longtime professional wrestling journalist Bill Apter, along with industry veterans Nash, Hall, Bam Bam Bigelow, Road Dogg, George Steele, Chris Kanyon, Steve Corino, Tony Mamaluke, Justin Credible, Paul Bearer, and Tammy Lynn Sytch, have gone on record saying they believe this to have been the case (Sytch reported that her former boyfriend, Chris Candido, also subscribed to this notion). Michaels recalled people backstage saying that the screwjob "had to be a work" and claimed that McMahon "took a dive" and "sold like he sells on TV" when struck by Hart following the incident. Hebner, who refereed the contest, was asked in 2019 if he thought Hart was "in on the work", to which he replied, "I really do... I'm not going to lie about it anymore."

Lawler, who served as ringside commentator for the match, found it plausible that Hart was working with McMahon. This position was shared by Hart's nephew Teddy Hart, as well as by his former colleagues Demolition (Ax and Smash), Road Warrior Animal, Steve Blackman, Gregory Helms, and Sean Waltman. Waltman, who claimed to know Hart well, was bewildered as to how Hart could not have seen the screwjob coming from "a million miles away", and felt there was a "high possibility" of the incident being a work. Waltman added that Hart would not have told anyone, including his wife, about his involvement, and deduced, "I think [the screwjob] was so compartmentalized that the guys that were in on it don't even know who else was." The Pro Wrestling Torch reported that, outside of the business, "many wrestling fans" believe the screwjob to have been a work. In an interview in 2022, Hart reaffirmed that the incident was not a work.

== See also ==
- Mr. McMahon
- Professional wrestling in Canada
- "The Montreal Screwjob" (Dark Side of the Ring)
