= WrestleMania XIV =

1998 World Wrestling Federation pay-per-view event

- Promotional poster featuring "Stone Cold" Steve Austin, Mike Tyson, and Shawn Michaels
- Promotion: World Wrestling Federation
- Date: March 29, 1998
- City: Boston, Massachusetts
- Venue: FleetCenter
- Attendance: 19,028
- Buy rate: North America: 730,000
- Tagline: The greatest PPV attraction of all time!

Pay-per-view chronology
← Previous; No Way Out of Texas: In Your House	Next → Unforgiven: In Your House

WrestleMania chronology
← Previous; 13	Next → XV

WrestleMania XIV, also promoted as WrestleMania dX raided, was a 1998 professional wrestling pay-per-view (PPV) event produced by the World Wrestling Federation (WWF, renamed WWE in 2002). It was the 14th annual WrestleMania and took place on March 29, 1998, at the FleetCenter in Boston, Massachusetts. This was officially the first WrestleMania of the Attitude Era.

A total of eight matches were held at the event. In the main event, "Stone Cold" Steve Austin defeated Shawn Michaels to win the WWF Championship for the first time; Michaels performed despite a severe injury sustained during a match at the Royal Rumble and would not compete again until SummerSlam in 2002. This pay-per-view event was also notable for the involvement of boxer Mike Tyson, who acted as a ring enforcer for the main event. This would also be the first WrestleMania since WrestleMania 2 in 1986 not to feature Bret Hart, who jumped to the rival World Championship Wrestling the previous year after the Montreal Screwjob.

== Production ==
=== Background ===
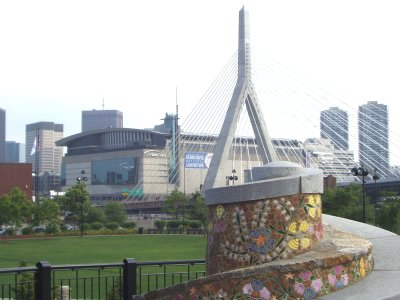
The 14th annual WrestleMania was held at the FleetCenter in Boston, Massachusetts.

WrestleMania is the World Wrestling Federation's (WWF, renamed WWE in 2002) flagship professional wrestling pay-per-view (PPV) event, having first been held in 1985. It has become the longest-running professional wrestling event in history and is held annually between mid-March to mid-April. It was the first of the WWF's original four PPVs, which includes Royal Rumble, SummerSlam, and Survivor Series, referred to as the "Big Four", and was considered one of the "Big Five" PPVs with the addition of King of the Ring in 1993. WrestleMania XIV was scheduled to be held on March 29, 1998, at the FleetCenter in Boston, Massachusetts. In print advertisements, the event was billed as "WrestleMania: dX raided".

=== Storylines ===
After the Legion of Doom lost their WWF Tag Team Championship to The New Age Outlaws in December 1997, they were then assaulted by the Outlaws and D-Generation X. At the Royal Rumble, the LOD lost a championship match, thanks in large part to Road Dogg handcuffing Hawk outside of the ring. Following this, the LOD suffered two defeats at the hands of NWA members Jeff Jarrett and Barry Windham. Finally, on the February 23 episode of Raw Is War, the LOD once again lost to The New Age Outlaws when, despite having the match all but won following a Doomsday Device, the non-legal Hawk did not leave the ring as Animal was making the cover; while the referee was busy removing Hawk, Animal was struck by the title belts, causing them to lose the match. Following the match, the two men brawled all the way to the back and announced their dissolution, not appearing again until WrestleMania.

After the Montreal Screwjob, Owen Hart was left as the only member of the Hart family to remain with the company; and after a temporary absence, Owen returned during the closing moments of D-Generation X: In Your House to attack Shawn Michaels. Following this, he turned his attention to Hunter Hearst Helmsley (who would later be known simply as Triple H) and the European Championship that Michaels had given to Helmsley as a Christmas present. After weeks of deterring a championship match by way of a fractured kneecap (which was, in fact, legitimate), Triple H finally acquiesced to a match on the January 26 edition of Raw Is War, only for The Artist Formerly Known as Goldust (who was dressing up from week-to-week in a bid for attention) to appear in Helmsley's place. After Hart won the match, WWF Commissioner Sgt. Slaughter declared the disguise to be so convincing that he upheld the decision and awarded the championship to Hart. On the March 2 episode of Raw Is War, Owen defended the title against Mark Henry. During the match, Chyna came to the ring and pushed Hart off the turnbuckle allowing Henry to lock on a bearhug, but before Owen could submit, Chyna delivered a blatant low blow to Henry, resulting in a disqualification in favor of Hart. The following week in a match against Barry Windham, Hart landed awkwardly on his ankle, suffering a sprained ankle with ligament damage as a result. On a special Tuesday edition of Raw Is War on March 17, Hart joined the commentary team with a supportive cast on his leg. This would bring Triple H to ringside, where he goaded Owen into an impromptu title defense despite his cast. During the match, Chyna appeared and struck Owen's ankle with a baseball bat, allowing Helmsley to capitalize and win the title back.

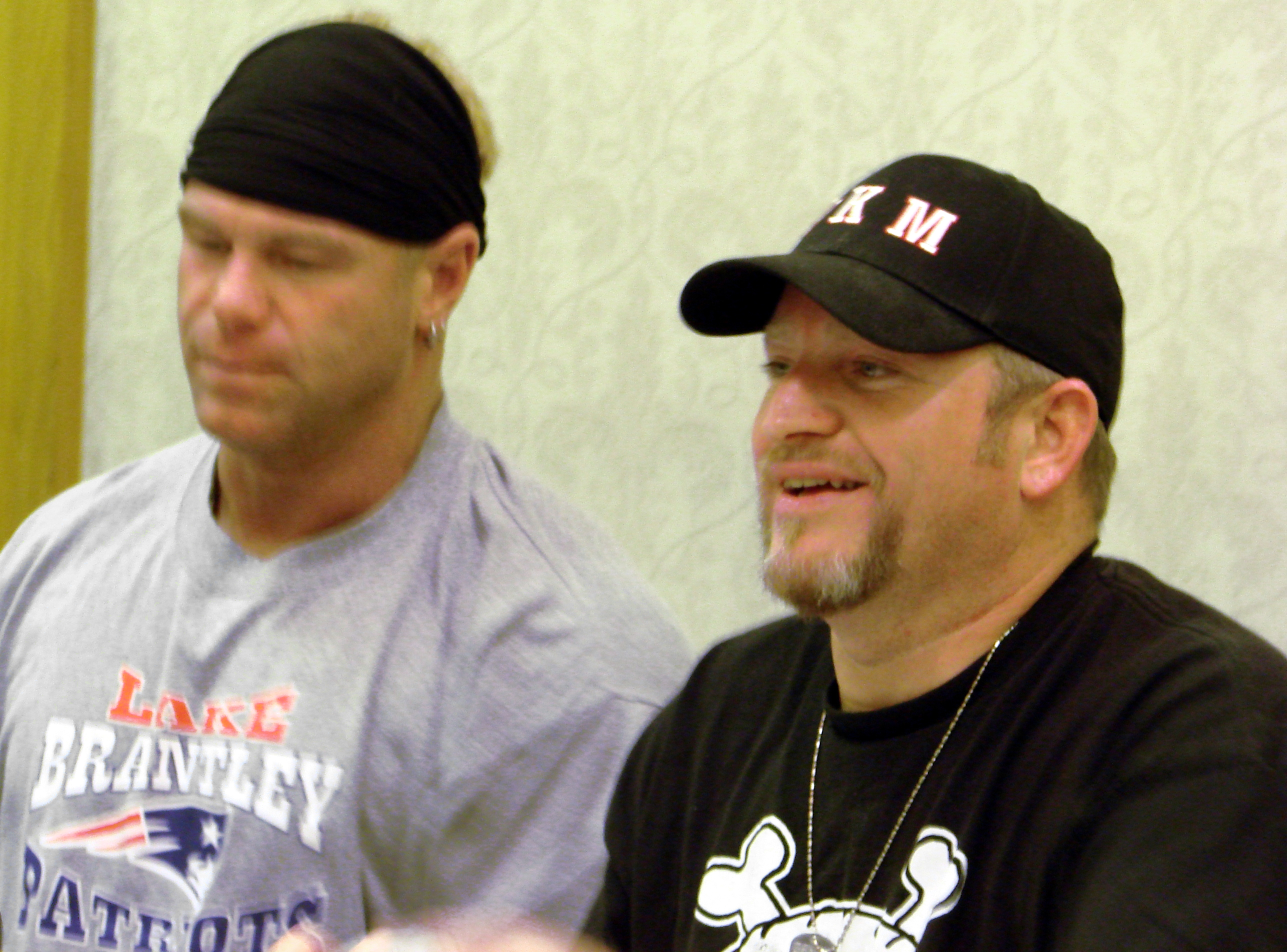
The New Age Outlaws (Billy Gunn and Road Dogg) were WWF Tag Team Champions going into the event.

Due to his jealousy over the attention his wife and valet, Sable, was garnering from the crowd, Marc Mero would try to intentionally cover up Sable's provocative clothing and eventually send her to the back during his matches, replacing her with The Artist Formerly Known as Goldust, who at the time was dressing up from week-to-week in his own bid of self-attention. Although the two initially worked well together, Goldust's valet Luna Vachon grew vocally disdainful of Sable, who was also being mocked by Mero and Goldust, causing Sable to eventually grow tired of the disrespect and fight back. As the two women brawled, their partners tried to separate them; but when Goldust grabbed Sable in order to restrain her, Mero's jealousy took over and he attacked him. The two men then had a match on Raw, where both women were handcuffed to the ring posts in an effort to prevent their brawling. But after the referee was knocked down, Goldust stole the key and unchained Luna who attacked Sable with make up, painting her face before also throwing water on her. Goldust then challenged Mero and Sable to a mixed tag team match at WrestleMania XIV.

After successively beating members of the Nation of Domination week after week, Ken Shamrock initially defeated the Intercontinental Champion Rocky Maivia (later known as The Rock) at the Royal Rumble despite being hit with a foreign object, seemingly winning the title. However, The Rock convinced the referee that it was, in fact, he who suffered an illegal attack and the referee reversed his decision (Maivia had placed the foreign object in Shamrock's trunks after hitting him with it). The following month at No Way Out of Texas: In Your House, Shamrock capitalized on the in-fighting of the Nation, due to leadership disputes between Faarooq and The Rock, by making the champion tap out in a ten-man tag team match. The two men were then scheduled for an Intercontinental Championship match at WrestleMania XIV with an added stipulation stating that if The Rock was disqualified, Ken Shamrock would win the championship.

At the end of the inaugural Hell in a Cell match at Badd Blood: In Your House, just as The Undertaker looked to win the match against Shawn Michaels, the lights went out and a huge masked man came to the ring, delivering a tombstone piledriver to the shocked Undertaker. The masked man was revealed to be Kane, Undertaker's (kayfabe) half-brother and, despite the animosity and the presence of Paul Bearer, Undertaker vowed never to fight his little brother. Before Undertaker's casket match with Michaels at the Royal Rumble, D-Generation X claimed Kane had joined them, but in fact, he came to the ring to assist Undertaker. The alliance was short-lived, however, as during the Royal Rumble, Kane came to the ring and turned on his brother, allowing Michaels to win the match before locking Undertaker in the casket and setting it ablaze, presuming his brother dead. On the March 2 episode of Raw Is War, Kane's scheduled opponent, "Stone Cold" Steve Austin, was taken out by D-Generation X before the match could begin. With nothing else to do, Bearer ordered the timekeeper to deliver a ten-bell salute for The Undertaker's passing, before then telling Kane to tombstone him. After he did, more bells were heard ringing, this time signaling Undertaker's arrival. The ringing continued much longer than normal, with Bearer vehemently denying the possibility of it being Undertaker. Eventually, a sarcophagus appeared on the top of the ramp. After the sarcophagus was struck by a bolt of lightning, The Undertaker sat up before revealing that he had been to Hell and talked with his parents, telling them that he would have to go back on his vow before finally challenging Kane to a match at WrestleMania. The week before WrestleMania, Kane came to the ring and began to display similar supernatural powers as his brother, striking the TitanTron with lightning, as well as the announce table, before finally striking a crew worker with lightning, setting him on fire; Undertaker was shown on the same episode speaking to his parents' gravestones, revealing it may have to take the damnation of his soul to reunite the troubled family.

In January, "Stone Cold" Steve Austin won the Royal Rumble match while Shawn Michaels retained his WWF Championship, all while Mike Tyson looked on from the director's box. The following night on Raw Is War, Vince McMahon was set to reveal that Tyson would be the special guest referee for WrestleMania's main event; however, Austin appeared and gave the finger to Tyson, offering him a fight and proclaiming the wrestling ring to be his, not Tyson's. Austin and Tyson then engaged in a massive brawl that garnered headlines all around the world. At the ensuing press conference, McMahon officially announced that due to the explosive situation, Tyson's role was being changed to that of ringside enforcer. On the February 2 episode of Raw Is War, in a scheduled match against Road Dogg, D-Generation X stormed the match and tied Austin in the ropes, allowing Shawn Michaels to hurl insults at Austin while rubbing the championship belt in his face, taunting him with it until Cactus Jack and Chainsaw Charlie came to his aid. The following week, Austin stole the championship belt from Michaels in the hopes of baiting him into a singles match, but the partnership of D-Generation X and The New Age Outlaws continued, allowing Michaels to retrieve the belt back. This all led to a "non-sanctioned" eight-man tag match at No Way Out of Texas: In Your House, which Michaels was unable to participate in due to a legitimate back injury; Austin won the match for his team by pinning Road Dogg. With WrestleMania drawing closer, on the March 2 episode of Raw Is War, Mike Tyson appeared once again to be interviewed by Vince McMahon, only for DX to interrupt; Shawn Michaels then challenged Tyson to a fight. After both men's entourages left the ring, the two taunted each other for a bit until Michaels would rip off Tyson's shirt, revealing a DX T-shirt underneath, showing the enforcer's degenerate alliance; Later in the evening, as Austin came out to take place in a match against Kane, Triple H appeared on the ramp and lured Austin to him. Austin fell for the trap, and promptly turned around into a Sweet Chin Music by Michaels which knocked him out, a trap which occurred again the following week. Also that week, during a St. Patrick's Day Tuesday broadcast of Raw Is War on March 17, Austin called out Vince McMahon and verbally berated him for describing Mike Tyson as "the baddest man on the planet", but McMahon would not be goaded into a fight, as he instead forced Austin to fight Rocky Maivia the following episode, just before WrestleMania.

== Event ==
Other on-screen personnel
Role:	Name:
English commentators	Jim Ross
English commentators	Jerry Lawler
Spanish commentators	Carlos Cabrera
Spanish commentators	Hugo Savinovich
Spanish commentators	Tito Santana
Interviewer	Kevin Kelly
Ring announcer	Howard Finkel
Ring announcer	Gennifer Flowers (Intercontinental Championship match)
Referees	Tim White
Referees	Jim Korderas
Referees	Jack Doan
Referees	Mike Chioda

Chris Warren and The DX Band opened the show by performing hard rock versions of "America the Beautiful" and "The Star-Spangled Banner". The audience did not react well to the performance, booing the band during and after their songs. This segment was edited off all subsequent home video releases, as well as Peacock and Netflix.

=== Preliminary matches ===
The night began with the mystery entrants in the tag team battle royal being revealed as the reunited Legion of Doom, now known as LOD 2000, with Sunny as their new valet. Savio Vega was first eliminated by Chainz meaning his tag team partner, Miguel Perez, had to leave too. Kurrgan illegally entered the ring to enact revenge on Sniper and Recon by eliminating them on behalf of The Jackyl. Barry Windham also illegally entered to eliminate Chainz, and so left his partner Bradshaw. The final four teams lasted a while until Skull would be eliminated by Henry Godwinn, which meant The Disciples of Apocalypse were eliminated. 8-Ball then eliminated Phineas Godwinn, which meant The Godwinns were then eliminated. Afterwards, The Godwinns attacked LOD 2000 with slop buckets before leaving. The Midnight Express tried to keep Animal out of the ring while double-teaming Hawk, but once Animal re-entered the ring, LOD 2000 simultaneously eliminated both Bob and Bart, leaving LOD 2000 the last team standing and the winners of the battle royal, earning them a shot at the WWF Tag Team Championships.

The second match was a Light Heavyweight Championship match, with Taka Michinoku defending his title against Águila, who thus earned the distinction of the first Mexican-born wrestler to work a WrestleMania match; this would be the first and only time the championship was defended at WrestleMania, though its successor, the Cruiserweight Championship would be defended at the event more than once. After throwing Taka out the ring and baseball sliding into him, Águila hit an asai moonsault outside the ring, but was soon the victim of a springboard crossbody after Taka reversed a suplex from the apron. Águila almost won the match with a moonsault crossbody into a pin, but remained on the offensive with a frankensteiner. Taka tried to land the Michinoku Driver, but as Aguila flipped out and attempted a hurricanrana, Taka managed a powerbomb reversal. Taka then stopped a high flying dive attempt by Aguila with a dropkick, before successfully executing a Michinoku Driver and picking up the win. After the match, both contestants shook each other's hand and celebrated together. Also, partway into the matchup, Jim Ross made a fleeting comment about the date of Taka's title win, December 7, the date of the Japanese bombing of Pearl Harbor, calling it "ironic enough". This incident went largely unnoticed, only causing a slight stir in the wrestling community.

Triple H made his way to the ring with his theme being played by the DX Band. Before Owen Hart came to the ring, Commissioner Sgt. Slaughter handcuffed himself to Chyna so that she would not interfere, despite her protestations. The match began with Hart pummeling Helmsley with fists before sliding out of the ring. Triple H tried to jump from the apron onto Hart, but made contact with the crowd barrier instead. After executing a powerbomb, Hart attempted to lock in the sharpshooter, but Helmsley reversed it and started some offensive maneuvers of his own, kicking Hart in the turnbuckle and delivering a suplex. Hart then suffered a cut to the bridge of his nose from a boot to the face, after which Triple H began to work on Hart's damaged ankle, dropping his knee onto it and stretching it. After avoiding another kick to the face and crouching Helmsley onto the ring post, Owen managed to take advantage, reversing a Pedigree attempt into the sharpshooter. Chyna, having to pull Slaughter, pulled Triple H to the rope for the break. As Slaughter was distracted, Chyna then threw white powder into Slaughter's face, causing the referee to check on him. While the referee was distracted and as Owen turned around to confront Triple H, Chyna low-blowed him from outside, allowing Triple H to successfully nail the Pedigree and retain the title. After she was freed from the handcuffs, Chyna nailed Slaughter with a forearm and shoved him over the barricade into the crowd.

Next up was the mixed tag team match. Marc Mero and Goldust began the match, but Goldust soon tagged in Luna Vachon, requiring Sable to be tagged in too, as per the rules. However, Vachon simply ran around the outside of the ring with Sable chasing her, before tagging Goldust back in. Wanting to get her hands on Vachon, Sable double-teamed Goldust with a boot to the face after an Irish whip from Mero, but could not get Vachon to enter the ring. A near-pinfall came from a running crossbody from Mero and following this, the two ran into each other, causing both men to crawl and tag in the women. Sable then took Luna down and punched her around the face before kicking her in the midsection and face in the turnbuckle and attacking Goldust, before running back to clothesline Vachon over the ropes. Vachon tagged Goldust in, but before Sable would do the same, she struck him in the face, then let Mero take over who had his TKO reversed into a DDT. Mero would then reverse the Curtain Call, allowing him the chance to try a moonsault pin to a standing Goldust. After Vachon struck a running Mero with her knee, Mero went to punch her, but ducked out of the way as Goldust ran to her rescue, causing him to inadvertently knock her off the apron. Mero then executed the TKO, but Luna interrupted the pin count, jumping on Mero's back resulting in Sable tagging in as Mero wandered around the ring with Vachon on his back. Sable tried pinning Goldust, but the referee was distracted and as he finally began to count, Sable leapt off Goldust so the interfering Vachon would inadvertently bodysplash Goldust. Sable then performed a powerbomb and Mero's TKO to win the bout.

Gennifer Flowers, who was accompanied by Jeff Jarrett and Tennessee Lee, then came to the ring as the special guest ring announcer for the upcoming Intercontinental Championship match between Ken Shamrock and Rocky Maivia, with the added stipulation that if Maivia was disqualified, he would lose the title. The fight began in the aisleway with a brawl that saw Shamrock get whipped into the steel steps before both men entered the ring. Maivia then delivered his People's Elbow, but could not secure a three-count. Shamrock then rolled out of the ring and grabbed a steel chair; when the referee tried to take it off him, he threw the referee into the corner; Maivia quickly grabbed the chair and hit Shamrock with it as the referee recovered. Shamrock kicked out and quickly re-gained the advantage, delivering a belly-to-belly suplex off an Irish whip and then securing his ankle lock submission in the center of the ring, making Maivia tap to win the match and the title. The surrounding members of the Nation quickly jumped into the ring, but Shamrock dispatched them all with suplexes, including the four hundred pound Mark Henry, before then reapplying the ankle lock to a bloody Maivia. Faarooq then ran down from the back and jumped onto the apron, only to look on at Maivia with a smile, before walking away. A number of referees (the ones Shamrock attacked were actually independent wrestlers, or stuntmen put in referee uniforms) and officials would appear, trying to subdue Shamrock. After being surrounded, Shamrock suplexed a referee and then an official before calming down as Maivia was wheeled away on a gurney. Howard Finkel then announced Shamrock had been disqualified for not breaking his ankle lock submission, meaning The Rock would retain the Intercontinental championship. This would cause Shamrock to become enraged and chase Rocky, and dump him off of the gurney and fighting him on the Chris Warren band stage.

The WWF Tag Team Championship match was a "Dumpster match", the objective being the first tag team to put their opponents into a dumpster with the lids being closed shut would be the winners. The match began with Billy Gunn facing Chainsaw Charlie and Road Dogg exchanging blows with Cactus Jack. Trying a cannonball on Road Dogg from the apron, Cactus missed and slammed himself into the dumpster instead. The Outlaws then focused on Charlie, using a back drop to deposit him into the dumpster and, as he attempted to climb out, they simultaneously slammed the lid shut on the hardcore legends' heads. With Cactus and Charlie both in the dumpster, the Outlaws shut the lid down on them, but Cactus managed to get back up while the Outlaws were celebrating and pushed Road Dogg down to the ground with a mandible claw, pulling him into the dumpster. Both teams took time to recover and began to brawl with weapons in the ring, Cactus Jack pulling out a ladder and climbing it opposite Billy Gunn, only for both men to be pushed off straight into the dumpster outside the ring, thanks to a dazed Chainsaw Charlie. Road Dogg pulled his partner out and the two then focused their efforts on Charlie, powerbombing him into the dumpster, but Cactus had managed to escape in the meantime. The fight eventually found its way to the backstage area, with both Outlaws throwing Cactus into boxes and promotional displays, but Jack replied with a chair shot to both of them and planted Billy Gunn onto a wooden pallet with a double-arm DDT. Charlie then reappeared on a forklift and elevated the wooden pallet as Jack dragged Road Dogg onto it too. Charlie then drove the forklift above a backstage dumpster and dropped both opponents inside as Cactus Jack closed the lid to win the WWF Tag Team Championship.

=== Main event matches ===
Before The Undertaker's match with Kane, baseball record-holder Pete Rose came to the ring as the special ring announcer. However, after insulting the hometown team and introducing Kane, he received a tombstone piledriver, starting a tri-year tradition. The Undertaker was preceded by a league of torch-bearing druids to the tune of "O Fortuna". As the match began, The Undertaker cornered Kane and threw a flurry of punches into him, ducking and reversing Kane's attempts until Kane hit him with a clothesline that he instantly sat up from. Kane then set Undertaker up in a tree of woe to begin his assault of punches and Irish whips, before suplexing Undertaker onto the ropes and delivering a flying club to the neck from the turnbuckle. As The Undertaker began to fight back, Kane threw him into the ropes, but Undertaker retaliated by jumping onto his back, which was met a face-first electric chair. Paul Bearer kept the referee distracted while Kane landed the steel steps onto Undertaker, and repeated the effort a second time while Undertaker was lying on the steps, crushing him in-between them. As the referee tried to keep Kane in check, Bearer slapped Undertaker while walking past him. Kane caught his brother running and delivered a chokeslam, but Undertaker lifted his shoulders off the mat before the three-count could be made. Kane put The Undertaker into a sleeper hold that he eventually fought out of with a flurry of punches. Undertaker then dropped Kane on top of the ropes and punched him off the apron; he followed this with an over the top rope suicide dive that Kane managed to sidestep, sending Undertaker crashing through the Spanish announce table. As Undertaker made it back into the ring, Kane hit him with a flying lariat. Undertaker then attempted to give Kane the Tombstone Piledriver, but Kane managed to shift his weight, reversing the positions and allowing Kane to deliver the tombstone to Undertaker instead. Undertaker kicked out and after landing a running clothesline, Undertaker chokeslammed Kane and then delivered a tombstone piledriver of his own; but Kane kicked out. This would mark the first time anyone had ever kicked out of Undertaker's tombstone piledriver. It would take three tombstones with a guillotine leg drop and flying clothesline in between to stop Kane. But in the end, Undertaker scored the pin and was victorious. As soon as the match was over, Bearer attacked Undertaker and ordered Kane to attack him, which he did with a chair shot to the head and then a tombstone piledriver onto the chair. After Kane and Bearer left, Undertaker sat up and left the ring.

"Stone Cold" Steve Austin and Shawn Michaels during their WWF Championship match

With Mike Tyson enforcing from ringside, the WWF Championship match began with both wrestlers taunting each other, engaging in a few light punches before Shawn Michaels escaped the ring and ran back in to take advantage of "Stone Cold" Steve Austin, but was met with a standing clothesline. Austin followed up by pulling down Michaels' tights, exposing Michaels' backside. Michaels then tried to run at Austin, but was back dropped over the top rope onto Triple H. As Triple H threw Austin into the crowd barrier, the referee ordered he and Chyna to leave ringside. As they were leaving Austin followed and fought with Triple H up to the entrance gate. Michaels caught up and hit Austin with a cymbal from the DX Band's stage, before Irish whipping Austin into the dumpster. As the match resumed in the ring, Austin met Michaels's high-risk maneuver with a clothesline and then ran him into the turnbuckle before picking him up for an inverted atomic drop. Michaels' attempt to pick up some momentum saw him picked up and dropped onto the ropes, but Michaels managed to push Austin away as he attempted a stunner. When Michaels tried to escape the ring though, Austin delivered a right hand, forcing the champion to fall upon the announce table. After Austin slowed the match down with a sleeper hold, Michaels tried to pull his knee into the ring post but was instead pulled into it himself. Austin then tried to rush at Michaels, but was back dropped into the crowd and struck with the ring bell. Michaels used the momentum to take advantage inside the ring, delivering a snapmare and then a low kick to the grounded Austin, while also taking time to taunt the audience. Austin briefly picked up some speed throwing Michaels out of the ring, but just as quickly lost ground as Michaels repeatedly worked on Austin's left knee, throwing it into the ring post before kicking and dropping onto it back inside the ring. When Austin tried to recover outside of the ring, he was met with a baseball slide that launched him over the announce table. Austin was then thrown back into the ring by Tyson, where he soon suffered a figure-four leglock that Michaels illegally elevated using the second and third ring rope. Austin's eventual counter was stopped by a rope break. Austin then tried to reverse a standing sleeper hold by throwing Michaels back into the turnbuckle, but unwittingly trapped referee Mike Chioda who fell unconscious. With both men on the floor, Michaels recovered with a kip-up and landed a high-flying elbow drop, getting in position for Sweet Chin Music. As Austin eventually stood up, he ducked the superkick, attempting a stunner on Michaels. Michaels responded by throwing Austin into the ropes before once again attempting Sweet Chin Music. However, Austin grabbed Michaels' foot, spun him around and nailed him with a Stone Cold Stunner. Mike Tyson jumped into the ring to make a quick three count and the new champion celebrated by tossing the enforcer an "Austin 3:16" t-shirt. When Shawn Michaels stood up, he confronted Tyson about his turn, but was met with a punch that instantly floored him, before Tyson then draped Michaels with Austin's t-shirt.

== Aftermath ==
The result of the main event heralded a changing of the guard in the World Wrestling Federation. Shawn Michaels, who had been a major superstar in the WWF for many years, having won his first WWF Championship at WrestleMania two years previously, took a four-year hiatus from wrestling due to a severe back injury sustained during the casket match against The Undertaker at the Royal Rumble. During his retirement, Michaels made several ostensible one-off appearances as a guest commentator during episodes of Raw Is War in the summer of 1998, and eventually replacing Sgt. Slaughter as the WWF commissioner at the end of the year, holding onto the position for a year and a half. After what was supposed to be a one-time match four years later at SummerSlam, Michaels and the now renamed World Wrestling Entertainment realized that his injuries had healed, and he made a full-time return to wrestling, eventually retiring permanently in 2010 at WrestleMania XXVI, 12 years after this event.

With "Stone Cold" Steve Austin as the new WWF Champion, the "Attitude Era" was fully ushered in. The company's iconic scratch logo had started to replace the "New Generation" logo and began to appear on ring aprons and promotional material during and after this event. The next night on Raw Is War after WrestleMania, the old WWF "winged eagle" world championship belt was retired, and a new belt design with a larger eagle and blue globe (dubbed as the "attitude globe" title) debuted, eventually being retired in 2002. The Attitude Era saw Austin's feud with Vince McMahon escalate and two weeks later, Raw Is War defeated World Championship Wrestling's Monday Nitro in the ratings war for the first time in eighty-four weeks.

Shawn Michaels' loss was criticized by Triple H the following night on Raw Is War, with Triple H blaming Michaels for "dropping the ball" and overlooking Tyson's potential double-cross. Helmsley delivered a promo essentially kicking Michaels out of the group, saying that he would now lead D-Generation X and turn it into an army, saying "the first thing you do is look to your blood. You look to your buddies. You look to your friends. You look...to the Kliq", before introducing a returning Sean Waltman, now under the "X-Pac" persona, who had re-signed with the company after being fired from World Championship Wrestling (WCW). Later in the evening, it was revealed that Road Dogg and Billy Gunn were also part of the DX Army.

The ongoing saga between The Undertaker and Kane continued to escalate even further. The following night, Paul Bearer challenged Undertaker on behalf of Kane to a match at Unforgiven: In Your House, where the ring would be surrounded by fire. The first man to be set ablaze would lose, thus giving birth to the Inferno Match.

By winning the fifteen-team battle royal, LOD 2000 won the right to face the WWF Tag Team Champions at Unforgiven. The champions by rights were Cactus Jack and Chainsaw Charlie, but some legal wrangling from The New Age Outlaws saw the match held up on account of the wrong dumpster being used. The vacant titles were then decided in a steel cage match between the two teams the following night, which the Outlaws won after interference from the newly formed DX Army, concreting their ties, and by handcuffing Charlie to the cage by his neck. Following this match, Charlie would return to his original moniker of Terry Funk, whilst Cactus Jack became Dude Love again. Meanwhile, the New Age Outlaws became part of the DX Army, achieving further success.

In a tag team match against Ken Shamrock and Steve Blackman, Rocky Maivia promised to show Faarooq that the Nation was stronger and more connected than ever before. The promise was a sour one as, during the match, Rocky left Faarooq to suffer the wrath of Shamrock and Blackman. Afterwards, Faarooq demanded that Rocky come back out so the two could fight. When Rocky returned and squared up to Faarooq, the other members of the Nation turned on him, and Maivia proclaimed himself as the new "ruler" of the faction.

Before Marc Mero's match with Taka Michinoku the next night, Luna Vachon appeared and challenged Sable to a singles match, which Sable promptly accepted. Vachon also announced that it was not to be a traditional wrestling match, because she wanted to humiliate Sable, and so it would be an evening gown match to be held at Unforgiven.

== Results ==
No.	Results	Stipulations	Times
1	LOD 2000 (Hawk and Animal) (with Sunny) won by last eliminating The Midnight Express (Bodacious Bart and Bombastic Bob) (with Jim Cornette) (Note: The other participants were: Los Boricuas (Savio Vega and Miguel Pérez, Jr.), Los Boricuas (Jose Estrada, Jr. and Jesus Castillo), The Truth Commission (Recon and Sniper), Bradshaw and Chainz, The Nation of Domination (Mark Henry and D'Lo Brown), The Nation of Domination (Faarooq and Kama Mustafa), The Quebecers (Jacques Rougeau and Pierre Ouellet), The Rock 'n' Roll Express (Ricky Morton and Robert Gibson), The Headbangers (Mosh and Thrasher), Too Much (Scott Taylor and Brian Christopher), Disciples of Apocalypse (8-Ball and Skull), Steve Blackman and Flash Funk, and The Godwinns (Phineas I. Godwinn and Henry O. Godwinn))	Tag Team Battle Royal to determine the #1 contenders to the WWF Tag Team Championship	8:19
2	Taka Michinoku (c) defeated Aguila	Singles match for the WWF Light Heavyweight Championship	5:57
3	Triple H (c) (with Chyna) defeated Owen Hart	Singles match for the WWF European Championship; Chyna was handcuffed to Sgt. Slaughter.	11:29
4	Marc Mero and Sable defeated The Artist Formerly Known as Goldust and Luna Vachon	Mixed tag team match	9:11
5	The Rock (c) (with The Nation of Domination) defeated Ken Shamrock by disqualification	Singles match for the WWF Intercontinental Championship; Had The Rock been disqualified, he would have lost the title.	4:49
6	Cactus Jack and Chainsaw Charlie defeated The New Age Outlaws (Road Dogg and Billy Gunn) (c) by putting the Outlaws in a dumpster with the lid completely shut	Dumpster match for the WWF Tag Team Championship	10:01
7	The Undertaker defeated Kane (with Paul Bearer)	Singles match	17:05
8	"Stone Cold" Steve Austin defeated Shawn Michaels (c)	Singles match for the WWF Championship; Mike Tyson was the special ring enforcer.	20:08
(c) / – the champion(s) heading into the match
