= Disciples of Apocalypse =

Professional wrestling stable

Stable
- Leader: Crush
- Members: Chainz; Skull; 8-Ball
- Manager: Paul Ellering
- Billed from: Kona, Hawaii (Crush)
- Debut: June 23, 1997
- Disbanded: May 14, 1999
- Years active: 1997-1999

The Disciples of Apocalypse (DOA) were a biker-themed professional wrestling stable in the World Wrestling Federation (WWF) in the late 1990s. The group came together from the firing of Crush and Savio Vega from the Nation of Domination stable in June 1997 and consisted of four main members: Crush, Chainz, Skull and 8-Ball.

== History ==
DOA began to form on the June 9, 1997, edition of Raw is War when, the leader of the Nation of Domination, Faarooq fired both Savio Vega and Crush from the stable. As a result, Crush proceeded to form his own Hells Angels-themed stable. The group consisted of Chainz, Skull and 8-Ball (both of whom are real-life cousins of Chainz). They were introduced as babyfaces on the June 23, 1997, edition of Raw is War and proceeded to feud with the new Nation of Domination led by Faarooq who were heels and Los Boricuas led by Savio Vega who were tweeners.

In late November 1997, Crush left the group, and the WWF in protest of the Montreal Screwjob and believing he would fare better in WCW. The WWF addressed this by saying Crush was Kayfabe put out of action by Kane. DOA continued as a stable with Chainz assuming leadership. With the loss of Crush, DOA started to team on a semi-regular basis with Ken Shamrock and Ahmed Johnson to battle Nation of Domination. They also feuded against the Truth Commission and their spiritual leader, The Jackyl. During this time, DOA would make their ring entrances astride custom-made Titan motorcycles.

In February 1998, Chainz started doing singles matches, but still remained a member of the DOA with Skull and 8-Ball. He teamed up with Blackjack Bradshaw for one match in the Wrestlemania XIV tag team battle royal, which they were eliminated from. After that, he continued doing singles matches, until he, Skull and 8-Ball went on to feud with the LOD 2000 and Droz. His last match in the company was a loss to Val Venis on the June 15, 1998, episode of Raw Is War. He failed a drug test after this match and he was fired from the WWF. After Chainz was fired, the LOD 2000's former manager Paul Ellering returned to the WWF, but turned on his former charges and sided with DOA. However, that angle soon died out and DOA entered a brief feud with Southern Justice. Soon after that, Ellering was beaten up and fired by the duo, after he had an argument with the duo and they formed a short-lived alliance with Brian Christopher and Scott Taylor known then as Too Much. Their last match in WWF as a tag team was a loss to Ken Shamrock and Mankind on May 14, 1999, at a house show. Soon after that match, DOA left the WWF later in May 1999. Then, both Skull and 8-Ball went to WCW.

== Championships and accomplishments ==
- Wrestling Observer Newsletter awards
  - Worst Feud of the Year (1997) - vs. Los Boricuas

== See also ==
- Demolition
- The Disciples of The New Church
- The Harris Brothers
- The Million Dollar Corporation
- Nation of Domination
- New World Order
- The Stud Stable
