= Royal Rumble (1998) =

World Wrestling Federation pay-per-view event

- Promotional poster featuring the back of "Stone Cold" Steve Austin's head
- Promotion: World Wrestling Federation
- Date: January 18, 1998
- City: San Jose, California
- Venue: San Jose Arena
- Attendance: 18,542
- Buy rate: 300,000
- Tagline: Pain! Just A 4 Letter Word.

Pay-per-view chronology
← Previous; D-Generation X: In Your House	Next → No Way Out of Texas: In Your House

Royal Rumble chronology
← Previous; 1997	Next → 1999

The 1998 Royal Rumble was a professional wrestling pay-per-view (PPV) event produced by the World Wrestling Federation (WWF, renamed WWE in 2002). It was the 11th annual Royal Rumble event and took place on January 18, 1998, at the San Jose Arena in San Jose, California. The event was based around the men's Royal Rumble match, a modified 30-man battle royal in which the participants enter at timed intervals instead of all beginning in the ring at the same time and the winner received a WWF Championship match at WrestleMania XIV. This was the first Royal Rumble of the Attitude Era.

Six matches were contested on the event's card. The main event was a casket match between Shawn Michaels, and The Undertaker for the WWF Championship, which Michaels won to retain the title. The main match on the undercard was the 1998 Royal Rumble match, which "Stone Cold" Steve Austin won by lastly eliminating "The Rock" Rocky Maivia, becoming the third person to win two Royal Rumble matches and back-to-back, after Hulk Hogan in 1990 and 1991 and Shawn Michaels in 1995 and 1996. This was subsequently the fourth Royal Rumble event in which the titular match was not the main event, after the inaugural 1988 event and the events in 1996 and 1997. Additionally, The Legion of Doom (Hawk and Animal) defeated The New Age Outlaws ("Road Dogg" Jesse James and "Badd Ass" Billy Gunn) by disqualification, therefore did not win the WWF Tag Team Championship, and Maivia defeated Ken Shamrock to retain the WWF Intercontinental Championship.

== Production ==
=== Background ===
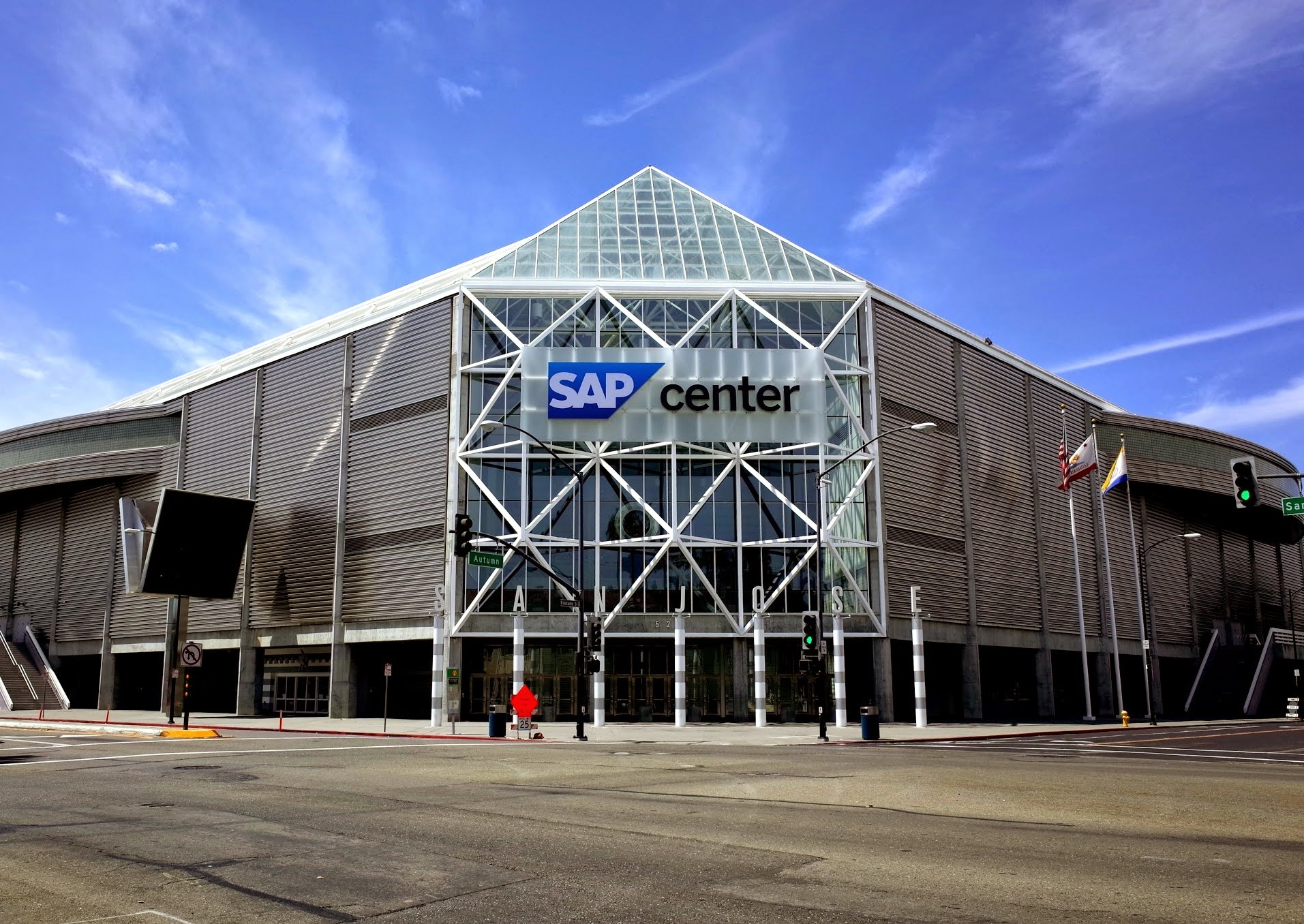
The 11th annual Royal Rumble event was held in San Jose, California at the San Jose Arena (pictured in 2014 after it had since been renamed as the SAP Center).

The Royal Rumble is an annual professional wrestling event, produced every January by the World Wrestling Federation (WWF, renamed WWE in 2002) since 1988; that first event was a television special before it became an annual pay-per-view (PPV) beginning in 1989. It is one of the promotion's original four PPVs, along with WrestleMania, SummerSlam, and Survivor Series, referred to as the "Big Four", and was considered one of the "Big Five" PPVs with the addition of King of the Ring in 1993. It is named after and centered on the men's Royal Rumble match. The 11th Royal Rumble event was scheduled to be held on January 18, 1998, at the San Jose Arena in San Jose, California.

The Royal Rumble match is a modified battle royal in which the participants enter at timed intervals instead of all beginning in the ring at the same time, and the match generally features 30 wrestlers. Since 1993, the winner earns a world championship match at that year's WrestleMania. For 1998, the winner earned a match for the WWF Championship at WrestleMania XIV.

=== Storylines ===
The event comprised six matches that resulted from scripted storylines. Results were predetermined by the WWF's writers, while storylines were produced on WWF's weekly television show, Raw is War.

In the weeks leading up to the pay-per-view, Ken Shamrock had been facing various members of the Nation of Domination ahead of his booked match against Intercontinental Champion "The Rock" Rocky Maivia, defeating Kama Mustafa and Faarooq with his ankle lock submission, despite interference from other Nation members. The final Raw is War before the Rumble saw Shamrock team up with Mark Henry against Maivia and D'Lo Brown. However, just as Shamrock looked to apply his ankle lock submission on The Rock, Henry turned on him, joining the Nation in giving him a post-match beat down.

After winning the team's first tag team title, the New Age Outlaws further humiliated the former champions, the Legion of Doom, by shaving one of Hawk's mohawks, and, with the help of D-Generation X, powerbombing Animal through the announcer's table, damaging his back. Although he was advised not to compete by doctors, Animal rested through the first few weeks of the year, while the Outlaws ran roughshod through the tag division before this pay-per-view.

The buildup to the Royal Rumble match itself focused almost entirely on "Stone Cold" Steve Austin, Austin declared that going into the Rumble, he would live by the motto "Do unto others before they do unto me". This led to Austin interfering in matches regularly on Raw is War, or appearing just as matches finished, delivering the Stone Cold Stunner to anyone in sight, as well as leaving other wrestlers backstage buried under tables, and chairs. In the final segment of the Raw is War preceding the event, all competitors of the Royal Rumble were in the ring, waiting to draw their number of entries, when Austin ran in through the crowd and began to throw punches all over the ring, sparking a brawl between the various wrestlers feuding in the ring, and kicking the number generator out of the ring.

The main event for the WWF Championship was a rematch between champion Shawn Michaels and challenger The Undertaker. Their feud had begun after SummerSlam the previous August after Michaels, who was the special referee in the match between then-champion Undertaker and Bret Hart, hit Undertaker with a chair meant for Hart, and counted the pin to cost Undertaker the championship. The first match between the two came at Ground Zero: In Your House the following month, a match that ended in a no-contest, due to outside interference from Michaels' D-Generation X cohorts, Triple H and Chyna. Michaels and Undertaker resumed their feud at Badd Blood in October 1997 in the first-ever Hell in a Cell match, which ended with the debut of Undertaker's (kayfabe) brother, Kane, giving Michaels the unfair win by delivering a tombstone piledriver on Undertaker, allowing the battered, and bloody Michaels to steal the win. To mock Undertaker, Triple H and Chyna brought a casket to the ring only for Michaels to appear from inside, and spray paint it in D-Generation X slogans. The following week, while Michaels was delivering a promo, the same casket appeared again, to which Michaels believed it was just Triple H and Chyna playing a prank on him. However, this time, Undertaker appeared from inside, grabbing Michaels by the throat, and dragging him into the coffin. Undertaker made his full presence known the following week, interrupting an interview in which Michaels was claiming to introduce the newest DX member: Kane. Undertaker warned Michaels and DX to leave his family out of the feud, before attacking the stable and being outnumbered. Kane then made a surprise appearance and helped Undertaker, fighting DX up to the ramp before turning and reaching his hand out in an Undertaker-like salute which his brother returned.

== Event ==
Other on-screen personnel
Role:	Name:
English commentators	Jim Ross
English commentators	Jerry Lawler
Spanish commentators	Carlos Cabrera
Spanish commentators	Tito Santana
French commentators	Jean Brassard
French commentators	Raymond Rougeau
Interviewer	Michael Cole
Ring announcer	Howard Finkel
Referees	Mike Chioda
Referees	Jack Doan
Referees	Jim Korderas
Referees	Earl Hebner
Referees	Tim White

The opening match began with Goldust attacking Vader as he entered the ring. Vader soon recovered, and threw Goldust into the turnbuckle, before eventually falling out of the ring, where he also shoved Luna Vachon to the ground. After a suplex, and a big splash, Goldust was dragged to the corner so Vader could attempt his Vader Bomb, but a low blow stopped him. Vader then attempted the move for the second time, only to have Luna jump on his back. Vader hit the move anyway and scored the pin.

With Sunny as the special guest referee, a six-man tag match of lucha libre midget wrestling took place. The face team took most of the early advantage, tagging frequently, while the heel team was regularly thrown under the bottom rope, and replaced with a fresh member. Max Mini used Sunny to help him dropkick Battalion, Tarantula, and then El Torito in order, before delivering a top rope hurricarana to Torito, and winning the match with a backslide pin.

Next up, the Intercontinental Championship bout began with an exchange of punches, and a few kicks until Ken Shamrock mistimed a hurricanrana, allowing Rocky Maivia to slam him down. After being kicked to the corner, Shamrock replied with a crossbody that only gained him a two-count, as did a fisherman suplex pin. Maivia then took control by reversing an Irish whip into a DDT, before putting the challenger in a headlock. Rocky's next attempt at a DDT was reversed, however, into a power slam, prompting the Nation members to storm the ring. With the referee distracted after Maivia's Nation of Domination teammate D'Lo Brown became entangled in the ropes, The Rock used brass knuckles to nail Shamrock, and hid the knuckles inside of Shamrock's trunks. By the time the referee looked back to the ring, he could only make a two count. Shamrock then recovered, and pulled off a belly to belly suplex slam, winning the match, and the title. However, as Shamrock celebrated, Maivia appealed to Mike Chioda who, upon discovering the foreign object in Shamrock's trunks, reversed the decision, and took the belt from a bemused Shamrock. Chioda gave the title back to Maivia, making him the winner via disqualification. A furious Shamrock then attacked the referee for stripping him of the title.

In the tag team match, New Age Outlaws prematurely began by attacking Legion of Doom before the bell rang. The LOD then quickly turned the match in their favor, chasing the Outlaws up the ramp as the champions tried to lose by countout. Still holding control, the LOD took turns on Road Dogg, who eventually handcuffed Hawk to the corner outside the ring. Regardless, Animal successfully dominated both Road Dogg, and Billy Gunn, power slamming Gunn into a pin that was broken up by a chair shot, causing the match to end via disqualification. The disqualification gave the victory to LOD, while the New Age Outlaws retained the belts. After the match, the Outlaws double-teamed Animal until Hawk broke free from the cuffs to save his partner.

The Royal Rumble match then began with Mick Foley's persona Cactus Jack as entrant #1, bringing trash cans to the ring. The second entrant was Terry Funk's alter-ego, and Cactus Jack's partner, Chainsaw Charlie, who came to the ring wielding his chainsaw before Cactus hit him with a chair, and the two engaged in a hardcore battle briefly interrupted by the third entrant, Tom Brandi, who they both eliminated over the top rope. As Rocky Maivia entered at #4, he was met with a trash can over the head, being bundled out of the ring under the bottom rope briefly. As the ring began to fill up, Cactus Jack went to clothesline Charlie over the top rope, but inadvertently threw himself over, and was eliminated. Owen Hart came out at #9, but before he was able to enter the ring, NWA North American Champion Jeff Jarrett, and his manager Jim Cornette attacked him. Soon after, at #16, Mick Foley returned to the ring in his Mankind gimmick, returning the favor by eliminating Chainsaw Charlie, while Ken Shamrock, and Maivia resumed their feud from earlier. Jarrett officially came out at #18 and was soon joined in the ring by Owen Hart, who ran out from the back and eliminated Jarrett. Hart himself was soon distracted by the non-competing Triple H, who hit Owen with a crutch as Chyna yanked him out. When the clock counted down to #22, no contestant appeared; with Jerry Lawler on commentary claiming that the number was given to "Stone Cold" Steve Austin, who had reportedly been taken out backstage. By #23, the Nation of Domination had four members (Maivia, D'Lo Brown, Mark Henry, and Kama Mustafa) in the ring, although they seldom worked together. All fighting in the ring ceased when Austin's music played for #24, but, after a lengthy wait, Austin appeared from the crowd, coming into the ring before tossing out Marc Mero, and 8-Ball. Savio Vega, who entered #26, was accompanied by the rest of Los Boricuas, who went straight after Austin. Faarooq completed the Nation stable in the ring, but went straight after teammate Maivia before Foley's third appearance as Dude Love. Soon, only four men remained (Maivia, Austin, Dude Love, and Faarooq). Austin, and Dude Love, former tag team partners, teamed up against the two Nation members, until Austin turned on Dude, allowing Faarooq to clothesline him out of the match. When Faarooq then turned to Austin, Maivia tossed his teammate out of the ring, leaving the former Intercontinental Champion against the current champion. Maivia survived almost being thrown out, only for Austin to nail him with a Stunner before he was finally eliminated, giving Austin the win, becoming the third person to win two Royal Rumble matches and back-to-back, after Hulk Hogan in 1990 and 1991 and Shawn Michaels in 1995 and 1996. This win would also be the last time someone would win back-to-back Royal Rumble matches until Cody Rhodes in 2023 and 2024.

The main event then began with The Undertaker mostly dominating Shawn Michaels. After walking on the top rope, Undertaker rolled Michaels into the casket, but Michaels' hand grabbing the ring apron stopped it from being shut. As Undertaker went to shut the casket, Michaels threw it open and dazed Undertaker by throwing powder into his eyes, leaving him stunned. Despite a throat shot, Undertaker began to lose his dominance of the match as things moved outside of the ring, with Michaels delivering a vicious piledriver on top of the steel steps, before fellow degenerate, Triple H, hit Undertaker with a crutch. Michaels, too, failed to close the coffin's lid on Undertaker, forcing the fight back into the ring, where Shawn tried to weaken Undertaker for good, executing a high-flying elbow drop, and hitting Undertaker with Sweet Chin Music. So sure of the win, and with Undertaker lying in the casket, Michaels chose instead to taunt Undertaker, giving a crotch-chop; which Undertaker seized on, leading to a brief fight in the ring, but going back into the casket when Undertaker missed a flying clothesline, and his momentum caused him to tumble inside. Michaels climbed to the top rope and delivered an elbow drop into the casket, and the two briefly fought inside the closed coffin. After eventually climbing out, both men made it back to the ring, where Undertaker gave Shawn a chokeslam. Undertaker then dragged the champion to the ring apron, and hit a jumping tombstone piledriver, depositing Michaels into the casket, and seemingly securing the victory. Before Undertaker could close it, however, the New Age Outlaws, and Los Boricuas ran in, and collectively pummeled Undertaker until the lights went out in the arena. Kane's music played, and the Big Red Monster single-handedly took out everyone in the ring, coming to his brother's aid. In the meantime, Chyna, and Triple H helped a visibly hurt Shawn Michaels out of the casket. Just then, Kane suddenly turned on Undertaker, punching him, and chokeslammed him into the casket. DX quickly capitalized on the opportunity and shut the lid, thus ending the match, and allowing Michaels to retain his title.

Kane was not done, however, as Paul Bearer came to ringside, and the two padlocked Undertaker inside the casket, before rolling it to the top of the entrance ramp, where Kane chopped holes in the casket with an axe. Kane then doused the casket with gasoline and set it on fire. After the show went off the air, with the casket still burning, Kane and Bearer left the arena, while various emergency officials extinguished the fire. WWF Commissioner Sgt. Slaughter and others tried to break open the casket to free the Undertaker. However, when the casket was opened, no one was inside. Undertaker's voice then was heard throughout the arena to say "Kane, until our paths cross again, I shall never rest in peace!"

== Reception ==
In 2010, Jack Bramma of 411Mania gave the event a rating of 7.0 [Good], stating, "Worth a look for historical purposes if nothing else. Rocky was clearly on his way to being a star, Austin wasn't quite yet the biggest name in the industry but was close, and Michaels' (sort of) career-ending injury. And oh yeah, four quality matches".

In 2019, Thomas Hall of Wrestling Rumors gave the event a rating of D, stating, "Good main event aside, this was a dull show overall. 1998 would wind up being an awesome year, but this wasn't the best start to it in the world. We saw a lot of the relics of the bad times here, but Austin was coming, and there was absolutely nothing WCW could do to stop him. This wasn't a good show at all, but it was a necessary evil to get us to the glory days".

In 2022, John Canton of TJR Wrestling gave the event a rating of 6/10, stating, "It was another average Royal Rumble event that was lacking in terms of great matches, aside from the main event. When it comes to that Undertaker/Shawn match, while it was very good, it's not their most famous match or their best match. The other undercard matches were poor, so that hurt the card quite a bit. In addition to that, the Royal Rumble match was probably the most predictable Rumble ever with Steve Austin winning. Aside from a few fun moments, it wasn’t very interesting at all. The crowd was engaged most of the night, so that's a positive, and I also felt like they built up the top WrestleMania matches pretty well. At least Mike Tyson botching his interview, and saying "Cold Stone" made me laugh".

== Aftermath ==
By winning the Royal Rumble match, "Stone Cold" Steve Austin won the right to face Shawn Michaels for the WWF Championship at WrestleMania XIV. Mike Tyson's presence in the director's box was revealed the following night because he was taking the role of special guest referee for the event. Following an altercation with Austin, however, Tyson's role was changed to special enforcer, and he soon allied with D-Generation X. At WrestleMania, however, Tyson showed his true colors and stepped in when the referee was knocked down, making the three-count for Austin. To this day, many see this moment as the official genesis for the "Attitude Era", and WWF's resurging dominance over chief rival World Championship Wrestling (WCW).

During his match with The Undertaker, Shawn Michaels suffered a severe back injury when he took a backbody drop on top of the casket, landing on his tailbone on the casket's outer mid-section. Michaels herniated two discs in his back and crushed a third, and the injury forced him to retire from wrestling immediately following WrestleMania. As it transpired, during a one-off match with Triple H at the 2002 SummerSlam, Michaels realized his back no longer hampered him, and he made a full-time return to wrestling. Michaels' back injury kept him out of all wrestling until the main event at WrestleMania, despite being billed on the card for the next PPV, No Way Out of Texas. His last-minute replacement was Savio Vega, who appeared in the main event eight-man tag team match, which saw several high-profile feuds converge on the road to WrestleMania.

The New Age Outlaws would go on to take part in the eight-man main event at No Way Out of Texas, sparring opposite Cactus Jack, and Chainsaw Charlie ahead of their WrestleMania title match. Their alliance with Triple H in this match saw them eventually join the newly-formed "DX Army" the day after WrestleMania. The Legion of Doom went on to suffer a series of losses, ending in another loss against the Outlaws on the February 23 episode of Raw is War, after which, the two had an in-ring brawl, and announced the dissolution of their team. They would then reappear in a modified form as "LOD 2000" in the opening WrestleMania match, with Sunny as their valet.

Rocky Maivia's feud with Ken Shamrock spilled out into a ten-man tag match between the Nation of Domination, and Shamrock's team, consisting of Ahmed Johnson, and the Disciples of Apocalypse. Shamrock won the match by pinning The Rock, and, as a result, faced him at WrestleMania once again for the Intercontinental title. At WrestleMania, Shamrock originally won the match, but would not release his ankle lock; thus, Shamrock was disqualified, and The Rock retained the championship.

The Undertaker would not return to action until WrestleMania, where he defeated Kane in a singles match. Their feud continued with an inferno match at Unforgiven: In Your House in April. Two months later, the two entered a storyline where Undertaker was eventually revealed to be in cahoots with his brother, which concluded with Paul Bearer reuniting with Undertaker, and turning on Kane, which eventually led to the formation of the Ministry of Darkness at the beginning of 1999. This also marked the last time Undertaker would face Shawn Michaels in a singles match until the two met at WrestleMania 25; Undertaker would wrestle Michaels once more at WrestleMania XXVI, where he won a "streak vs. career" match, forcing Michaels to retire from wrestling for good.

== Results ==
No.	Results	Stipulations	Times
1	Vader defeated The Artist Formerly Known as Goldust (with Luna) by pinfall	Singles match	7:51
2	Max Mini, Mosaic, and Nova defeated Battalion, El Torito, and Tarantula by pinfall	Six-man tag team match with Sunny as the special guest referee.	7:48
3	"The Rock" Rocky Maivia (c) defeated Ken Shamrock by disqualification	Singles match for the WWF Intercontinental Championship	10:52
4	The Legion of Doom (Animal and Hawk) defeated New Age Outlaws (Billy Gunn and Road Dogg) (c) by disqualification	Tag team match for the WWF Tag Team Championship	7:57
5	"Stone Cold" Steve Austin won by last eliminating "The Rock" Rocky Maivia	30-man Royal Rumble match for a WWF Championship match at WrestleMania XIV	55:24
6	Shawn Michaels (c) (with Chyna and Triple H) defeated The Undertaker by putting Undertaker in the casket with the lid completely shut	Casket match for the WWF Championship	20:37
(c) / – the champion(s) heading into the match

=== Royal Rumble entrances and eliminations ===
A new entrant came out approximately every 90 seconds.

– Winner

Draw	Entrant	Order	Eliminated by	Time	Eliminations
1	Cactus Jack	2	Chainsaw Charlie	09:21	1
2	Chainsaw Charlie	6	Mankind	25:19	3
3	Tom Brandi	1	Cactus Jack and Chainsaw Charlie	00:12	0
4	"The Rock" Rocky Maivia	29	"Stone Cold" Steve Austin	51:32	3
5	Mosh	3	Kurrgan	13:09	0
6	Phineas I. Godwinn	12	Mark Henry	28:48	1
7	8-Ball	15	"Stone Cold" Steve Austin	30:43	1
8	Blackjack Bradshaw	16	Dude Love	35:45	1
9	Owen Hart	10	Chyna and Triple H	02:00	1
10	Steve Blackman	4	Kurrgan	05:58	0
11	D'Lo Brown	17	Faarooq	32:21	1
12	Kurrgan	5	8-Ball, Bradshaw, Ken Shamrock, Chainsaw Charlie, Phineas I. Godwinn, and The Rock	03:38	2
13	Marc Mero	14	"Stone Cold" Steve Austin	19:38	0
14	Ken Shamrock	9	The Rock	09:15	1
15	Thrasher	19	"Stone Cold" Steve Austin	28:08	0
16	Mankind	7	The Artist Formerly Known as Goldust	02:07	1
17	The Artist Formerly Known as Goldust	24	Chainz	26:01	2
18	Jeff Jarrett	8	Owen Hart	01:05	0
19	The Honky Tonk Man	18	Vader	19:55	0
20	Ahmed Johnson	11	D'Lo Brown and Mark Henry	03:18	0
21	Mark Henry	26	Faarooq	19:07	2
22	Skull	13	Unable to compete due to injury	00:00	0
23	Kama Mustafa	20	"Stone Cold" Steve Austin	13:58	0
24	"Stone Cold" Steve Austin	-	Winner	15:58	7
25	Henry O. Godwinn	23	Dude Love	11:32	0
26	Savio Vega	21	"Stone Cold" Steve Austin	09:29	0
27	Faarooq	28	The Rock	10:03	3
28	Dude Love	27	Faarooq	07:53	2
29	Chainz	25	"Stone Cold" Steve Austin	04:56	1
30	Vader	22	The Artist Formerly Known as Goldust	02:15	1

Referee Jack Doan was inadvertently kicked by Phineas I. Godwinn during his elimination, resulting in the referee suffering a concussion.

Triple H and Chyna were not entrants in the Royal Rumble Match; they arrived in the arena during Honky Tonk Man's entry and worked together to eliminate Owen. Owen then ran after both of them to the backstage area.

Owen was unable to compete in the Rumble for a while as he was beaten up by Jeff Jarrett on the way to the ring; he joined in the Rumble later on after Jarrett's entry, taking his revenge on Jarrett and eliminating him.

Skull never made it to the ring; he was attacked by Los Boricuas prior to the Royal Rumble match when they mistook him for "Stone Cold" Steve Austin.

Mick Foley is the only competitor to enter the same Royal Rumble match 3 times under different personas.
