= Los Boricuas =

Professional wrestling stable

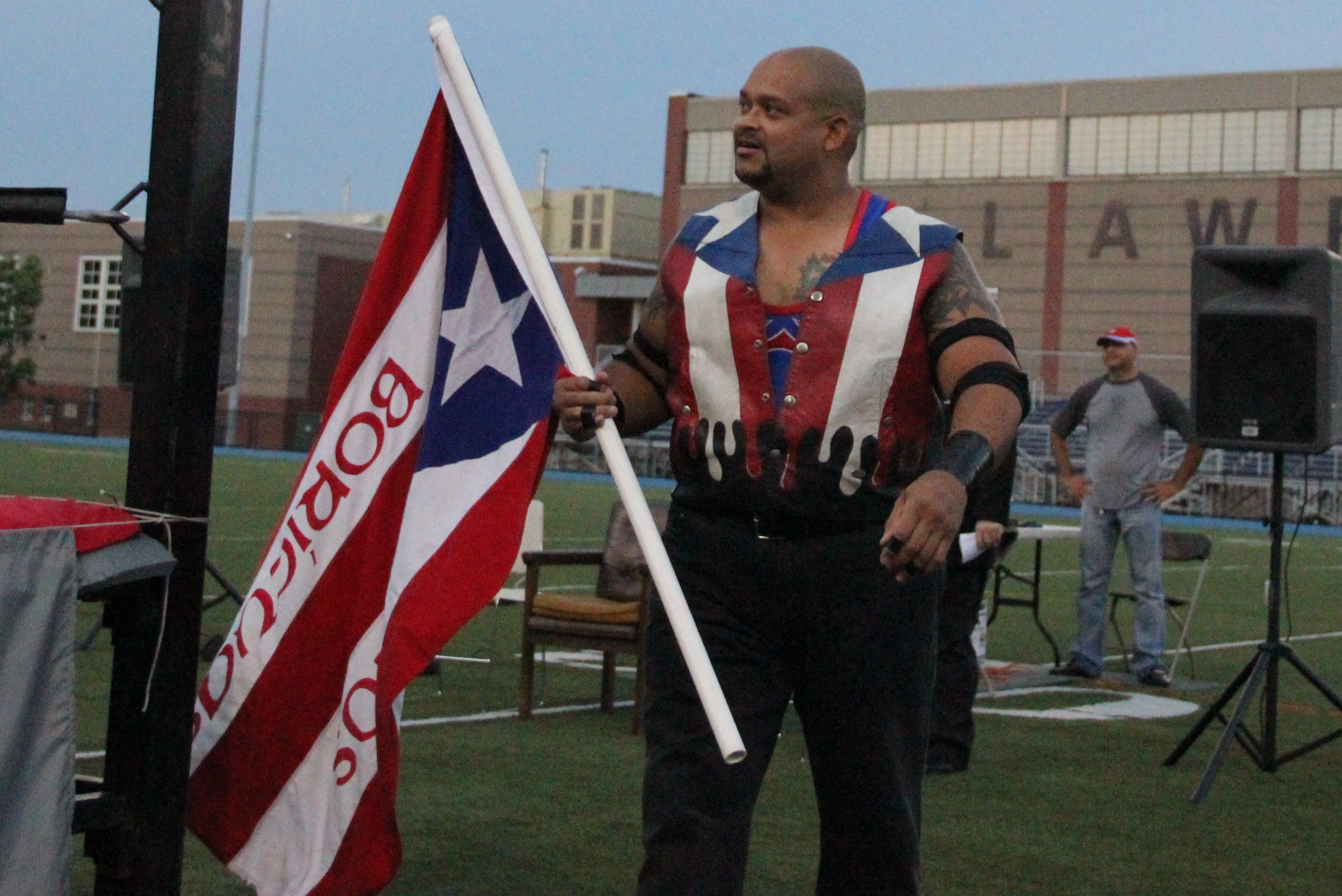
- Savio Vega hoisting the version of the flag of Puerto Rico used by Los Boricuas.

Stable
- Name(s): Los Boricuas; The Caribbean Express; La Revolución; Los Autenticos
- Leader: Savio Vega
- Members: Miguel Pérez; José Estrada Jr. Jesús Castillo
- Billed from: Puerto Rico
- Debut: 1997
- Disbanded: 2015
- Years active: 1997–1999; 2000-2001; 2002-2009; 2013-2015

Los Boricuas (Spanish for "the Puerto Ricans") were a professional wrestling stable that originated in the World Wrestling Federation in the late 1990s. The name was derived from a popular nickname for Puerto Rican people, since all the stable's members were from Puerto Rico. Different variants of the team have since performed in the International Wrestling Association, Dominican Wrestling Entertainment, World Wrestling League and the World Wrestling Council.

== History ==
=== World Wrestling Federation (1997–1999) ===
The stable was led by Juan Rivera under his Savio Vega gimmick. The character formed the stable after he was fired from the Nation of Domination. The group made its television debut in June 1997. The group featured three second-generation WWF wrestlers. The son of Miguel Pérez Sr., Miguel Perez, Jr. joined after participating in Extreme Championship Wrestling and World Championship Wrestling. José Estrada, Jr. was the son of another former title holder, former WWF Junior Heavyweight Champion José Estrada. Jesús "Huracán" Castillo is the son of Huracan Castillo Sr. who wrestled in the 1960s and 1970s. They were mainly involved in angles with other stables including the Nation of Domination and the Disciples of Apocalypse. They defeated the Disciples of Apocalypse in an eight-tag team match at Summerslam (1997). Vega competed in the Royal Rumble (1998). The rest of the Boricuas attacked Skull of the Disciples of Apocalypse, thinking that Skull was Stone Cold Steve Austin. Skull was injured and did not compete in the Rumble. The rest of the Boricuas went in the ring tried to attack Austin. Austin took out all of the non-competitors Boricuas and eliminating Vega out of the Rumble. Later that night, Los Boricuas attacked The Undertaker alongside the New Age Outlaws to aid Shawn Michaels in defeating Undertaker in a casket match. During WrestleMania XIV's tag team Battle Royal, Los Boricuas engaged two teams (Savio and Miguel, and José and Jesús), fighting on Raw is War. Vega left the group in July and would return to a singles career before being released in August after suffering an arm injury during the Brawl for All tournament. Castillo still a team member, became a jobber on Shotgun. Perez, Castillo and Estrada would still fight as a tag team on Raw is War and Shotgun until October 1998 and competed on Super Astros until the show ended in September 1999 and all three of them left the company. Their final match as a group took place on the August 29 episode of Super Astros, where Savio Vega returned to WWF as their manager and managed them to a win against Papi Chulo, Pantera and Apolo Dantes. On September 5, 1999, Los Boricuas made their final appearance in a backstage segment, which was the last episode of Super Astros.

=== International Wrestling Association (2000, 2001) ===
In 2000, all three members except Estrada teamed together in International Wrestling Association (IWA) in Puerto Rico.

All members of The Los Boricuas including Vega reformed in 2001 in Puerto Rico's IWA, for the IWA's Tenth Anniversary show. The promotion contracted Jesús Castillo and staged a one-night reunion. At the event, Los Boricuas defeated a stable known as "La Revolución Dominicana" in a flag-on-a-pole match.

=== Los Autenticos (2002-2009) ===
From 2002 to 2009 Vega and Perez teamed together continuing to work in IWA Puerto Rico known as Los Autenticos. On November 29, 2008, they won the IWA World Tag Team Championship defeating the Arabians. They only held the titles for 15 days before vacating them.

=== Reunions (2013–2024) ===
On July 1, 2013, Alejandro Franqui, the president of a promotion named Perfect Stars Wrestling (PSW) announced that its first show would serve as a homage to Los Boricuas. The event was scheduled for August 24, 2013, and would also support SER de Puerto Rico, a non-profit organization. This was followed by a series of skits where Savio Vega started recruiting the members of Los Boricuas. On the first, released on July 6, 2013, where he visited a surprised Castillo at a gym, remembering some of their time at WWF. The second aired two days later, depicting him confirming Castillo to Franqui and contacting a similarly surprised Estrada through Skype, who also confirmed his presence. This marked Estrada's first wrestling-related appearance in years. The final segment was published on July 9, 2013, instead featuring Pérez randomly entering Vega's office and confirming that he was going to join his fellow Boricuas. Like with Estrada, Pérez was abandoning a prolonged period of inactivity, making his first appearance in over a year since performing as president of the IWA. However, when the promotion's debut was postponed, this homage was cancelled. On July 19, 2013, Los Boricuas joined the World Wrestling League (WWL), with all but Estrada joining the promotion's roster. In storyline, they were recruited to feud with the AAA World Trios Champions, Los Psycho Circus. The first encounter between both teams concluded without a clear winner, being ruled a double countout. On September 8, 2013, Los Boricuas defeated Los Psycho Circus.

On June 15, 2014, Castillo reappeared in the World Wrestling Council, where he joined Pérez. This variant was recognized as another reunion of Los Boricuas and was alternatively called "The Caribbean Express". At Summer Madness, Pérez and Castillo defeated a team known as Los Templarios to win the WWC World Tag Team Championship. The following week, Castillo lost a singles match that enabled a rematch for the titles. On July 11, 2015, independent promotion New Wrestling Revolution announced that another incarnation of Los Boricuas formed by Vega and Pérez would be appearing in an event named Summer Revolution held weeks later. Performing as heels, the tag team was brought in to work a feud with a stable known as La Revolución.

On April 4, 2024, Los Boricuas reunited at the 2024 edition of the WrestleCon Mark Hitchcock Memorial Supershow at the 2300 Arena in Philadelphia, Pennsylvania alongside Nathalya Perez to take on the FBI consisting of Little Guido and Tommy Rich teaming up with Deonna Purrazzo.

== Legacy ==
Rapper and part-time professional wrestler Bad Bunny made references to two members of the group in a Raw appearance prior to 2023 edition of Backlash, after which Savio Vega symbolically named him the "5th Boricua". Vega himself made several appearances at the event, handing Bad Bunny a "Boricua kendo stick" for his San Juan Street Fight and using the stable's entrance music during a second intervention where he was joined by the Latino World Order.

== Championships and accomplishments ==
- Dominican Wrestling Entertainment
  - DWE Tag Team Championship (1 time) - Vega and Pérez
- International Wrestling Association
  - IWA World Tag Team Championship (9 times) - Pérez y Castillo (7), Vega y Pérez (2)
- World Wrestling Council
  - WWC World Tag Team Championship (2 times) - Pérez and Castillo
- Wrestling Observer Newsletter awards
  - Worst Feud of the Year (1997) - vs. Disciples of Apocalypse

== See also ==
- Nation of Domination
