= Mike Chioda =

American senior referee (born 1966)

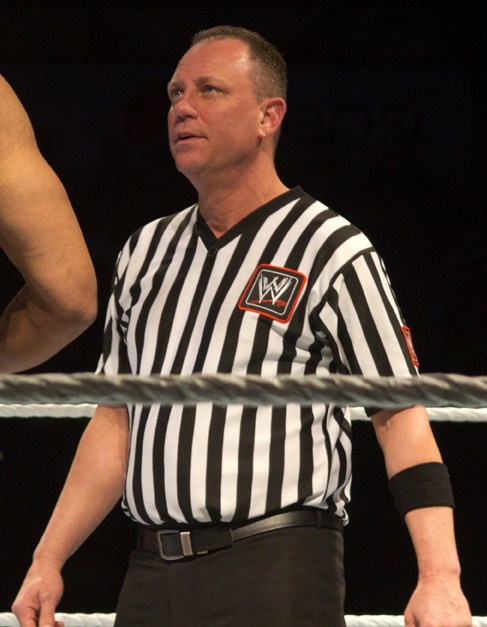
- Chioda in 2012

Personal information
- Born: Michael Joseph Canzano; 1 August 1966 (age 60) Willingboro Township, New Jersey, U.S.

Professional wrestling career
- Ring name: Mike Chioda
- Billed height: 6 ft 0 in (1.83 m)
- Billed weight: 175 lb (79 kg)
- Trained by: Joey Marella
- Debut: 1989
- Retired: 2022

Michael Joseph Canzano (born 1 August 1966) is an American retired professional wrestling senior referee. He is best known for his tenure with WWE from 1989 to 2020, where he performed as a referee under the ring name Mike Chioda. He was the longest-serving referee in the company, with a career spanning over three decades.

== Professional wrestling career ==
=== World Wrestling Federation/Entertainment WWF/WWE (1989–2020) ===
As a young adult, Chioda lived close to the Marellas (Gorilla Monsoon and his son Joey), who helped him break into the wrestling business. Being trained as a referee, Chioda first began to appear in WWE in 1989, when it was known as the World Wrestling Federation (WWF), most notably at Survivor Series 1989. After taking a hiatus from refereeing following WrestleMania VII, he began to reappear on camera around 1992.

He refereed the match where The 1-2-3 Kid (on that night he was simply known as "The Kid") as a jobber scored a huge upset over Razor Ramon. In May 1996 Chioda was involved in a controversial ending of a WWF Championship match at In Your House 8: Beware of Dog. During the match between Shawn Michaels and the British Bulldog, the referee for the match Earl Hebner got injured and knocked out of the ring during the match and Chioda came to the ring as a replacement, when Michaels performed a German suplex, Chioda counted Michaels's shoulders down and awarded the match to the Bulldog, but at the same time Chioda counted Michaels' down, Hebner came back in the ring and counted Bulldog's shoulders down and awarded the match to Shawn Michaels, then (on-screen) President Gorilla Monsoon came to ring and declared the match a draw. On 18 January 1998, at Royal Rumble, Chioda was the referee for the Intercontinental Championship match between Ken Shamrock and The Rock. During a match, Chioda was distracted by The Rock's team Nation of Domination when The Rock's teammate D'Lo Brown's foot gets stuck with the ropes, before The Rock used brass knuckles to hit Shamrock and then disposed of the knuckleduster inside Shamrock's trunks behind of his back. By the time, Chioda looked back to the ring, he could only make a two count and Shamrock pulled off a belly to belly suplex slam, winning the match. However, as Shamrock celebrated, Rock appealed to him who, upon discovering the foreign object, reversed the decision and took the belt from a bemused Shamrock. Chioda gave it back to The Rock, making him the winner via disqualification. A furious Shamrock attacked him for stripping him of the title. On 3 July 1999, on Shotgun, Chioda got an Implant DDT from Gangrel following his loss against Test which Chioda officiated.

Chioda has also competed in an actual wrestling match, teaming with Chris Jericho and The Rock to take on the team of The Dudley Boyz and referee Nick Patrick on an episode of SmackDown! in 2001. Chioda actually scored the pinfall victory after delivering his version of "The People's Elbow" to Nick Patrick.

During the WWF tenure, he officiated matches such as Shawn Michaels vs. Steve Austin at WrestleMania XIV, Triple H vs. Vince McMahon at Armageddon 1999, and The Rock vs. Hulk Hogan at WrestleMania X8.

Following the September 11 attacks, Chioda began to wear an American flag patch on his referee shirt.

During the WWE Brand Extension, Chioda was sent to SmackDown! to become senior referee of that show. On an "All Referee" edition of the WWE.com show Byte This! in 2004, he told an inquiring Josh Mathews that he did not like the old-style "button-up and bow-tie" referee attire, preferring, at the time, the SmackDown! variant of referee shirt.

During his tenure on SmackDown!, he officiated a WWE Championship match between Big Show and Brock Lesnar in which Lesnar performed a superplex on Big Show and the ring collapsed. Chioda would rule the match a no contest.

In 2003, he was traded to Raw. Following the firing of Raw's senior referee Earl Hebner in 2005, Chioda was appointed as Raw's head referee.

At WrestleMania 23, he refereed the WWE Championship match between John Cena and Shawn Michaels, but was taken out after being hit with Sweet Chin Music by Michaels.

During his time as Raw brand head referee he would officiate Raw matches such as Triple H vs. Batista at WrestleMania 21, John Cena vs. Triple H at WrestleMania 22, Cena vs. Shawn Michaels at WrestleMania 23 and Cena vs Batista at SummerSlam 2008, WrestleMania XXVI, Extreme Rules 2010, and Over the Limit 2010 (Batista's last match in WWE before he quit for the first time). He also appeared in an episode of WWE Tough Enough's second season.

In November 2008, referees were made no longer exclusive to certain brands. Chioda refereed his first match on SmackDown in three years on 28 November 2008, when he refereed the Beat The Clock Match between Shelton Benjamin and Triple H; during the match, Chioda was knocked down and the match ended in controversy when it was decided that Jeff Hardy and Triple H finished their matches in the same amount of time. To settle this, the WWE Championship Match at Armageddon 2008 was made a Triple Threat Match.

At the pay-per-view event WWE Over the Limit 2011, The Miz initially defeated John Cena after a cell phone recording of Cena's voice saying "I Quit" was played into the microphone, although when the referee Mike Chioda heard it, he immediately reversed the decision and ordered the match to restart. This led to Cena defeating The Miz and retaining the WWE Championship. On 15 August 2011, Chioda was suspended for 30 days due to his first violation of the WWE's Talent Wellness Program.

On 1 April 2012, Chioda refereed the main event match of WrestleMania XXVIII between John Cena and The Rock. Chioda was featured as the referee in the 2012 iOS game, WWE Wrestlefest.

He refereed the main event of WrestleMania 31 between Brock Lesnar and Roman Reigns, turning the scheduled singles match into a triple threat match midway through after Seth Rollins cashed in his Money in the Bank contract mid-match, in which he won the WWE World Heavyweight Championship. The next year at Money in the Bank 2016, Chioda was the referee for the matches on the night when all three members of The Shield were WWE World Heavyweight Champion. Chioda refereed the WWE World Championship match between Dean Ambrose and A.J. Styles at Backlash.

On 15 April 2020, WWE announced that Chioda had been released from his WWE contract after 31 years with the company.

=== All Elite Wrestling (2020, 2022) ===
On 12 August 2020, episode of AEW Dynamite, Chioda made his All Elite Wrestling debut as the referee for the AEW TNT Championship match between Cody Rhodes and Scorpio Sky. Later in the night, he officiated the rematch between Orange Cassidy and Chris Jericho. On 7 November 2020, Chioda returned to referee the TNT Championship match between Cody Rhodes and Darby Allin at Full Gear. On 29 May 2022, Chioda officiated the finals of the Men's Owen Hart Foundation Tournament between Samoa Joe and Adam Cole at Double or Nothing, which Cole won.

=== Retirement ===
On 31 July 2022, Chioda would referee the main event at Ric Flair's Last Match between Ric Flair and Andrade El Idolo against Jay Lethal and Jeff Jarrett. The day before the match took place, Chioda stated in an interview with the Battlefield Podcast that this match would be the "final chapter in my book" with regards to his career with professional wrestling. However, he later recanted his position and stated he is not retired and still has "a few good years left" in his career and expressed interest in a return officiating for WWE.

On 30 August 2025, Chioda stated in an interview with Chris Van Vliet that he is "pretty much retired" as a professional wrestling referee.

Sporting positions
Preceded by First	WWE SmackDown Senior Referee; 2002-2003	Succeeded by Nick Patrick
Preceded by Earl Hebner	WWE Raw Senior Referee; 2005-2008	Succeeded by None
Preceded by none	WWE Senior Referee; 2008–2016	Succeeded by Replaced with WWE Raw Senior Referee and WWE Smackdown Senior Referee
Preceded by First	WWE SmackDown Senior Referee; 2016–2020	Succeeded by Charles Robinson
