= WWF Capital Carnage =

1998 World Wrestling Federation pay-per-view event

- Event logo
- Promotion: World Wrestling Federation
- Date: December 6, 1998
- City: London, England
- Venue: London Arena
- Attendance: 10,441

Pay-per-view chronology
← Previous; Survivor Series	Next → Rock Bottom: In Your House

WWE in Europe chronology
← Previous; One Night Only	Next → No Mercy

Capital Carnage was a 1998 professional wrestling pay-per-view (PPV) event produced by the American promotion World Wrestling Federation (WWF, renamed WWE in 2002). It was the company's second PPV event to air exclusively in the United Kingdom and it took place on December 6, 1998, at the London Arena in London, England. The event's title was a reference to it taking place in London, the capital of England.

The card compromised 11 matches, including one dark match before the PPV broadcast. In the main event, "Stone Cold" Steve Austin defeated Kane, Mankind, and The Undertaker in a fatal four-way match. In another prominent match, The Rock defeated X-Pac by disqualification to retain the WWF Championship. Jim Ross suffered his second Bell's palsy attack on-air during this event. He did not officially call matches again for the WWF until the main event of WrestleMania XV the following year in March.

During this time, the PPV market was relatively new to the UK, as before 1997, all PPV events were broadcast for free on Sky Sports. UK-exclusive PPVs were established as a means to promote this new delivery method, however, the events were booked and treated similarly to house shows. The event was released on DVD in the UK and Europe on July 12, 2010, in a set also including the UK-exclusive No Mercy as part of WWE's Tagged Classics range released by Silver Vision, without any edits to the original content, most notably keeping all mentions and appearances of the WWF logo intact and un-blurred.

== Background ==
The event was held at the London Arena in London, England.

In September 1997, the American professional wrestling promotion World Wrestling Federation (WWF, renamed WWE in 2002) held a pay-per-view (PPV) event titled One Night Only, which was held in and broadcast exclusively in the United Kingdom. The PPV market was relatively new to the United Kingdom at the time, as before 1997, all PPV events were broadcast for free on Sky Sports. The WWF's UK-exclusive PPVs were established to serve as promotion for the new delivery method, however, they were booked and treated similarly to house shows. The WWF's second UK-exclusive PPV event was scheduled as Capital Carnage to be held on December 6, 1998, at the London Arena in London, England. The event's title was a reference to it taking place in London, the capital of England.

== Event ==
Other on-screen personnel
Role:	Name:
Commentators	Jim Ross
Commentators	Jerry Lawler
Commentators	Vince McMahon (main event only)
Interviewer	Michael Cole
Ring announcer	Tony Chimel
Special Guest	Vinnie Jones
Referees	Mike Chioda
Referees	Earl Hebner
Referees	Tim White
Referees	Shane McMahon

During the event, Jim Ross suffered his second Bell's palsy attack on-air.

The opening contest between Gangrel and Al Snow began with a mixture of head grapples and arm bar take downs. Snow quickly clamped Gangrel and headbutted him, before using Gangrel's legs to throw him over Snow's back. The first unsuccessful pin count came from a flying crossbody from Snow, the ensuing calm allowing Gangrel to perform a DDT on Snow and then subdue him with clotheslines and a leg sweep. When Gangrel tried to perform a second DDT, though, Snow managed to reverse the hold into a bridged suplex pin. By the time Gangrel had kicked out, The Brood came to ringside and distracted the referee allowing Snow to use Head on Gangrel, but it also gave Edge the opportunity to floor Snow with a missile dropkick which gave the victory to Gangrel.

The tag team match saw Droz and Mosh fighting, Droz dropkicking both Mosh and then Thrasher who tried to interrupt his offense. As Mosh came back into the ring he tagged Thrasher who was also dominated by Droz but a blind tag back again allowed Mosh to make a diving crossbody to take down Droz and choke him on the ropes, another tag permitting The Headbangers to double team Droz with a leap frog body guillotine. Droz soon tagged in Animal but the match suddenly ended when Animal was illegally double teamed, when the referee tried to push out the illegal man Droz ran in, pushing Animal out of the ring to take his place but before he could do anything was rolled up in a schoolboy pin by Mosh and lost the match, despite Animal handling the Headbangers quite well. More referees appeared when an impromptu fight broke out between Animal and Droz, Animal leaving the ring in disgust.

Goldust began the match by dropping Val Venis onto the steel steps, before taking him back in the ring to scoop slam him and then slap him in the face. Despite being thrown into the turnbuckle, Goldust did the same to Venis and gave him a clothesline to boot. Goldust almost pinned Venis after a bulldog but attempting another running attack proved too much for Goldust who was caught in the air with a spinebuster. Venis followed this up with a flying crossbody and a fisherman suplex pin but to no avail. The two collided from a running attack, with Venis falling to the floor and Goldust leaning back into the ropes and then falling forward, dazed, inadvertently headbutting Venis' crotch. As Venis retired to the turnbuckle to recover, Goldust put him in position for Shattered Dreams but Venis pulled the referee in the way as Goldust attempted the kick. As Goldust argued with the referee, Venis rolled him over into the pin and won. As Venis celebrated, Goldust took him from behind with a sitout rear slam and then performed the Shattered Dreams for the pleasure of the audience.

After a clip of Vince McMahon's speech at Oxford, and then a promo from McMahon and his followers about changes to the card (X-Pac facing The Rock in place of Triple H) and the inclusion of Vinnie Jones as a special guest enforcer, Tiger Ali Singh fought Edge. Edge began punching Singh as soon as he had come through the crowd for his entrance and after losing some advantage, threw Singh over his back and dropkicked him. When Singh tried to escape the onslaught by going outside, Edge threw him back in. Despite a thumb to the eye, Singh still fell foul of an inverted atomic drop and a missile dropkick, surviving a pin fall with a rope break. As Singh recovered, Edge climbed to the top rope and attempted a diving crossbody but was caught mid-air and powerslammed into the mat before being covered for the pin, helped by Singh's feet gaining leverage from the second rope. Edge beat down Singh after the match and celebrated.

Before the mixed tag match, Jacqueline attacked her partner Marc Mero and had to be separated by referee Tim White. The match began with Christian hip tossing and dropkicking Mero, from which he escaped with a tag meaning that WWF Women's Champion Sable had to be tagged in. Despite wanting to spar with Christian, as soon as Sable entered the ring she fled to the corner and tagged in Mero. The mixed rules were ignored as Sable went to fight Mero; Mero mocked her by pulling his boxing shorts up high (so that she had less places to punch him 'below the belt') but Christian swiftly pulled them down to his ankles from behind. Sable kicked him on the floor until Christian took over as the competitor, kicking Mero out of the turnbuckle before tagging Sable in again and double teaming him with an Irish whip and superkick, respectively. Jacqueline refused to join the match and so Christian continued to fight Mero, who was pulled to the floor by his hair while taunting the crowd and then floored with a crossbody pin that Jacqueline stopped. Mero then set Christian up with a Samoan drop in order to attempt the Wild Thing, but Christian pulled at the top rope causing Mero to fall off and performed a reverse DDT. Again Sable was tagged in without Jacqueline joining the match, to which she replied by performing a Sable Bomb on the dazed Mero before pulling Jacqueline into the ring over the top rope as Mero tried to flee, with Christian in pursuit. Sable, meanwhile was kicking Jacqueline in the corner, before reversing an Irish whip into the TKO to pin her. An enraged Jacqueline tried to attack the referee, punching him to the floor but White stood up, with Jacqueline on his shoulders and Sable ripped away her clothes, leaving her completely topless and causing her to run to the back. The nudity was not edited out of the VHS tape in the United States.

The WWF Intercontinental Championship match began with Steve Blackman being scoop slammed to the mat by Ken Shamrock but replied with a spinning heel kick. A fast-paced affair early on, the match saw a number of kicks and punching variations from both competitors until Shamrock slowed the match with a slam suplex that could not lay Blackman down for the pin. Despite many attempts from Blackman, Shamrock remained dominant over the match, keeping Blackman subdued in the corner with punches and then weakening him with a front face lock sleeper hold in the middle of the ring. Even when Blackman escaped it, he was still floored with a knee to the face. When Blackman managed to daze Shamrock, throwing him out of the ring, he baseball slid into Boss Man's face which he retaliated by striking with his nightstick when Blackman was back inside the ring. This allowed Shamrock to secure his ankle lock and make Blackman tap out.

Triple H began dominating Jeff Jarrett with basic wrestling headlocks and trying to pin his opponent after a spine buster. After Jarrett kicked out he threw Triple H out of the ring and then, when he was back in the ring, choked Triple H on the bottom rope, with Debra aiding the effort. When she repeated the effort Chyna chased her off and helped Triple H back into the match, but Jarrett applied a sleeper hold which Helmsley reversed with a belly to back suplex, leaving both men on the floor. As they fought their way back up, Triple H used the ten-punch in the corner and, despite being thrown into the opposite corner, Triple H was aware of where he was and stopped short, attacking a celebrating Jarrett. After dropping Jarrett's face on his knee, Triple H threw him out of the ring and went to continue his assault when Debra made her presence known on the apron. Chyna tried to intervene but the referee disputed with her, and Debra walked into the ring to distract Triple H with her sexuality as Jarrett brought a steel chair into the ring. But as Tim White tried to rid Debra from the ring, Chyna grabbed the chair out of Jarrett's hands allowing Triple H to use the Pedigree and win the match.

The WWF Tag Team Championship match began with D'Lo Brown throwing Road Dogg around the ring but Road Dogg replied with a series of punches and his signature shaky kneedrop. Brown recuperated outside of the ring with a pep talk from Mark Henry while Billy Gunn was tagged in on the opposing team. Brown had a similar time against Gunn, being whipped around the ring before being picked up for a gorilla press slam before fleeing the ring again. When he returned he instantly tagged in Henry who, after a show of strength, swung Gunn around with a bear hug. After slapping Henry's ears, Gunn was able to pick up speed, Road Dogg being tagged in for a double team dropkick to floor Henry and double hiptoss to Brown. Road Dogg tried to stay dominant over Henry but was soon thrown on the ground, before Brown was tagged in and isolated Road Dogg finishing with the Lo Down before tagging Henry back in who jumped on Dogg with a big splash and had to be saved by Gunn from being pinned. While in the ring Gunn dragged his partner to the corner, returning to the apron only to tag himself in and taking out both Brown and Henry. Throwing them around but being caught mid-air by Henry who slammed him into the mat, taking his breath away so that even after a Fameasser on Brown, he could not move to cover him. By the time the two had recovered, Gunn was able to pick Brown up for a piledriver, which he botched halfway between the traditional move and a piledriver face slam, but nevertheless pinned Brown afterward.

The WWF Championship match between the two 26-year-olds showcased X-Pac's speed and agility as he reversed the Rock's Irish whips by jumping over him and floored him with a variety of kicks. At one point the kicks came with such a flurry that, in trying to back away from them, Rock fell backwards through the ropes onto his face outside. The Rock then grabbed his belt and tried to leave the match but was met up the walkway by Triple H and Chyna who intimidated him back into the ring. Despite being able to kick Rock back to the floor, his attempt at a Bronco Buster left him stranded on the ropes and receiving kicks himself from Rocky. The two fought to the outside of the ring where Rock tried to spit soda into X-Pac's eye but had the drink punched out of his mouth. When they returned inside the ring, Rock kept X-Pac down with a sleeper hold and a low blow, picking up only to floor him once more with a Russian leg sweep. After picking him up again, Rock scoop slammed X-Pac in the middle of the ring to deliver the Corporate Elbow but could not secure a three count, which Rock replied with a sleeper hold. X-Pac elbowed his way out of the hold and was assisted when Triple H distracted the referee allowing Chyna to low blow Rock, leading to a schoolboy pin that could not keep The Rock down, nor could the subsequent spinning heel kick. As the fighting became fast and furious again, referee Earl Hebner was taken out when he X-Pac was thrown into him in the turnbuckle. With the referee down Rock grabbed his WWF Championship belt and went to strike X-Pac, he ducked though and as Rock turned round he was met by Triple H and X-Pac's European Championship belt. After the referee slowly came to and counted the pin, Rock kicked out and escaped the ring to attack Chyna. Triple H responded by kicking Rock to the floor which the referee did see, ending the match by disqualification. Rock was further attacked by the two DX members and even fellow Corporation member Ken Shamrock could not save him.

The main event saw Shane McMahon as the ring announcer, announcing more changes to the card with Pat Patterson as the guest time keeper, Gerald Brisco as the special guest referee and Big Boss Man changed to enforcer alongside Vinnie Jones. After a brawl between the two enforcers, Brisco gave Jones a red card and had him ejected. The four-way match began prematurely with Mankind and Kane brawling before The Undertaker arrived, who chokeslammed Mankind and threw him outside before throwing Kane out too. Steve Austin then made his entrance but was met on the walkway by Undertaker while Mankind and Kane continued to fight in the middle of the ring, Mankind being taken down with a flying lariat. After dealing with Undertaker, Austin then took Mankind around the ring smashing head into the announce table and crowd barrier. Austin and Undertaker continued to fight inside the ring, Austin using his vest to choke his opponent but was taken down with a flying clothesline and leg drop. Kane, meanwhile, was being beaten by Mankind outside the ring and had his head thrown into a television monitor. In the ring Austin recovered from Undertaker's dominance with a Lou Thesz Press but Kane broke up the pin count. Kane then fought Austin as Undertaker dealt with Mankind. Undertaker used some cable to choke Mankind, then Kane came up behind and choked Undertaker with cable before finally Austin used some cable to choke Kane as Mankind escaped and used a microphone to the head of Undertaker and Kane. Eventually the four wrestlers came back into the ring with Kane choking Undertaker into the corner until Austin turned his attention to Kane. Undertaker did not thank him for it, though, instead trying to walk the rope for Old School but his balance was thrown when Mankind threw Kane against the ropes. Austin and Mankind briefly teamed up against Kane, then Mankind offered his hand in alliance but Austin replied with a finger. Mankind replied with a mandible claw until Undertaker pulled him off his feet and wedged his crotch into the ring post from outside the ring. Kane and Undertaker then teamed up on Austin but while nobody was looking Mankind donned Mr Socko, kicking Austin and then high-fiving the referee. Mankind then brought a steel chair into the ring, hitting Kane but receiving a shot by Undertaker. As Undertaker tried to pin him, Austin hit him on the back with a chairshot and was met with a slow count from Brisco. With the ring cleared, Kane tried to chokeslam Austin but was kicked in the crotch and received a stunner. Again Brisco tried to avoid the count by checking the time on the outside. An enraged Austin kicked Brisco out of the ring meaning Earl Hebner had to run to ringside when Undertaker chokeslammed both Kane and Austin. When the count was broken up by Mankind, Undertaker fought with him on the outside of the ring during which time Austin stunnered Kane and covered him to win the match. When Brisco attacked Hebner, Austin also gave him a stunner. Vinnie Jones then came down to the ring and kicked Boss Man to allow Austin to deliver another stunner before Hebner kicked him out of the ring, using an Austin like taunt.

== Reception ==
The event has received mixed reviews from critics.

In 2018, Kevin Pantoja of 411Mania gave the event a rating of 4.0 [Poor], stating, "Like most UK only Pay-Per-Views, this didn’t feature a ton of quality performances. However, the crowd was molten hot for everything, which helped each match along. The guys didn’t have to give their all, because the fans would eat it up either way. Rock/X-Pac and the main event were both good matches that ended the show on a relatively high note. Of the ten matches, only two are flat out bad and those go about six combined minutes. The rest of the show is painfully average and not really something you need to check out."

In 2018, CJ of Retro Pro Wrestling described the event as a "fun show," stating, "All in all then, a fun show. WWF Capital Carnage isn't the kind of pro wrestling that's going to change your life. It isn't the kind of pro wrestling event that's going to have you raving to all your friends about afterwards. But it is the kind of event you can pop on for a few hours on a quiet afternoon and be glad that you did. The Rock/X-Pac WWF title match is the true standout here, with the main event a close second. That said, outside of the atrocity that was Shamrock/Blackman, everything here is watchable and -for the most part- enjoyable."

In 2022, Matt of PDR Wrestling described the event as "just average," stating, "I don’t think I’m breaking any new ground here to say this felt like a house show in front of a hot crowd. There’s no new story development, no title changes, and not exactly a bunch of great matches. Capital Carnage is just average and nothing really to check into unless maybe you’re a HUGE fan of X-Pac. Even then, it was a little disappointing. Thumbs down for the one and only Capital Carnage PPV."

== Results ==
No.	Results	Stipulations	Times
1^{D}	Droz defeated Mosh	Singles match	6:00
2	Gangrel defeated Al Snow (with Head)	Singles match	5:51
3	The Headbangers (Mosh and Thrasher) defeated The Legion of Doom (Animal and Droz)	Tag team match	3:21
4	Val Venis defeated Goldust	Singles match	5:33
5	Tiger Ali Singh defeated Edge	Singles match	2:51
6	Christian and Sable defeated Jacqueline and Marc Mero	Mixed tag team match	4:49
7	Ken Shamrock (c) (with Big Boss Man) defeated Steve Blackman by submission	Singles match for the WWF Intercontinental Championship	6:51
8	Triple H (with Chyna) defeated Jeff Jarrett (with Debra)	Singles match	6:55
9	The New Age Outlaws (Billy Gunn and Road Dogg) (c) defeated D'Lo Brown and Mark Henry	Tag team match for the WWF Tag Team Championship	12:34
10	The Rock (c) defeated X-Pac (with Chyna and Triple H) by disqualification	Singles match for the WWF Championship	12:34
11	"Stone Cold" Steve Austin defeated Kane, Mankind, and The Undertaker (with Paul Bearer)	Fatal four-way match Gerald Brisco was the special guest referee and Big Boss Man was the special guest enforcer.	16:12
(c) / – the champion(s) heading into the match; D / – this was a dark match

== See also ==
- 1998 in professional wrestling
- Professional wrestling in the United Kingdom
