= Marc Mero =

American amateur boxer and professional wrestler

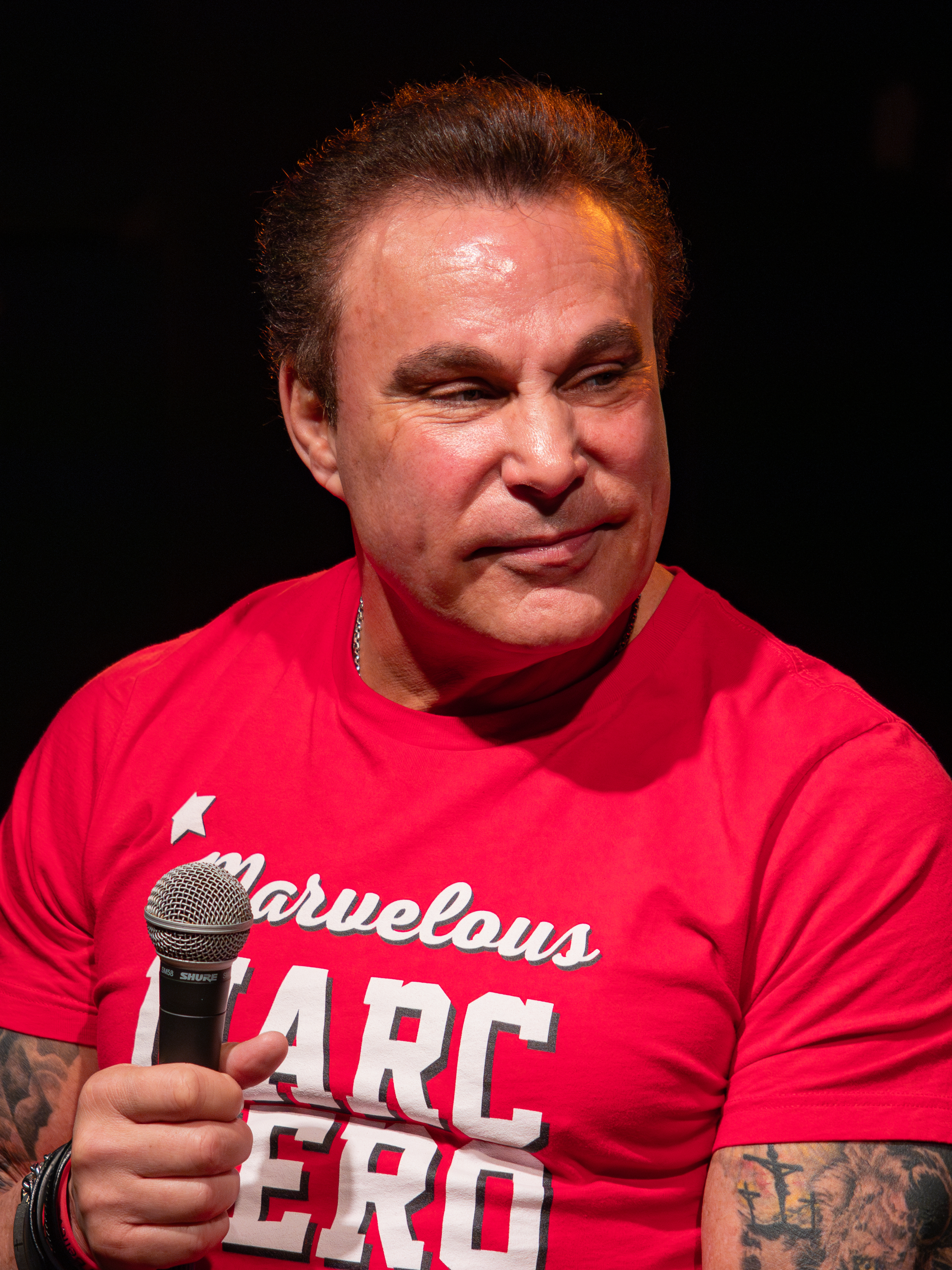
- Mero in 2025

Personal information
- Born: July 9, 1960 (age 66) Buffalo, New York, U.S.
- Spouses: Sable (m. 1994; div. 2004) Darlene Spezzi (m. 2009; div. 2019) Malissa Mero (m. 2025)
- Children: 1

Professional wrestling career
- Ring name(s): Johnny B. Badd "Wildman" Marc Mero; The Wildman "Marvelous" Marc Mero
- Billed height: 6 ft 1 in (185 cm)
- Billed weight: 235 lb (107 kg)
- Billed from: Syracuse, New York (as Marc Mero in WCW); Macon, Georgia (as Johnny B. Badd in WCW); Buffalo, New York/Jungles (as "Wildman"/"Marvelous" Marc Mero in WWF)
- Trained by: Boxing: Ray Rinaldi; Wrestling: Boris Malenko; Dean Malenko; Joe Malenko
- Debut: 1990
- Retired: 2006

YouTube information
- Channel: Marc Mero
- Years active: 2008–present
- Genres: Motivational speaker; Mental health
- Subscribers: 150 thousand
- Views: 47.5 million
- Last updated: August 4, 2026

Marc Mero (born July 9, 1960) is an American motivational speaker and retired professional wrestler and amateur boxer. He is best known for his appearances with the World Wrestling Federation (WWF, now WWE) under his real name and with World Championship Wrestling (WCW) and NWA Total Nonstop Action (NWA TNA) under the ring name Johnny B. Badd.

Mero was heavily pushed as a mid-carder as "Johnny B. Badd" in WCW during the early 1990s. He won the WCW World Television Championship three times during the course of his career before departing the company due to creative differences in 1996. He would then compete in WWF under his real name, making his debut at WrestleMania XII and going on to win the WWF Intercontinental Championship. He would then feud with his wife Sable before departing in 1999. Mero's last mainstream appearance was in NWA TNA, where he wrestled sporadically in the mid-2000s.

== Early life ==
Mero was born into a Jewish family in Buffalo, New York (his grandfather shortened the family name from "Merowitz"). His parents divorced when he was eight years old, with his mother supporting him and his two siblings by working two jobs. At the age of 12, Mero began playing hockey, eventually becoming his league's Most Valuable Player. In 1973, Mero's family relocated to Liverpool, New York, where Mero played for the Mid State Youth Hockey League. At age 15, Mero began playing for the Syracuse Stars Junior Hockey Team.

Mero began playing football in his senior year at Liverpool High School, with his team winning the New York State Public High School Athletic Association Title under the tutelage of future Notre Dame and UCF coach George O'Leary. In the same year, Mero began training as a boxer under Golden Gloves coach Ray Rinaldi. Mero went on to win four New York State titles, including the New York Golden Gloves tournament. Mero intended to become a professional boxer, but his career was sidelined after his nose was broken in an accident. He briefly pursued a bodybuilding career, placing third in the Mr. New York State bodybuilding contest.

In his 20s, Mero became a Christian.

== Professional wrestling career ==
=== Training and early years (1990–1991) ===
In 1990, Mero decided to become a wrestler, traveling to Tampa, Florida to train under the Malenkos. He debuted in June 1990 in Suncoast Pro Wrestling, against Chris Zaharias. He would spend the next several months working the Florida independent circuit.

=== World Championship Wrestling (1991–1996) ===
==== Early years (1991–1993) ====
Several months after his SPW debut, Mero began working for World Championship Wrestling, originally as enhancement talent. He debuted on February 4 at the WCW Saturday Night television taping at the Center Stage Theater in Atlanta, teaming with Greg Sawyer in a loss to NWA World Tag Team Champions Doom in a non-title squash match that aired on February 16. Mero spent over three months putting over big names like Sid Vicious, Ron Simmons, Lex Luger, Sting, Rick Steiner, Big Van Vader and The Young Pistols, before he was eventually signed to a contract by booker Dusty Rhodes. Rhodes repackaged Mero with the ring name Johnny B. Badd (as a nod to the Chuck Berry song "Johnny B. Goode") and he was given the character of a flamboyant Little Richard look-alike. He was initially a villain and managed by Teddy Long. He debuted at the inaugural SuperBrawl pay-per-view, on May 19, 1991, where he was introduced as Long's newest client. He made his televised in-ring debut on the June 1 episode of World Championship Wrestling against enhancement talent Kip Abee. Badd made his pay-per-view debut at The Great American Bash, where he lost to The Yellow Dog by disqualification after Long tried to remove Yellow Dog's mask.

Badd was heavily pushed upon his debut, being placed in the rankings of the top ten contenders for the World Heavyweight Championship due to a dominant undefeated streak. He put his lip stickers on the faces of his defeated opponents after matches. On August 25, he participated in a tournament for the vacated United States Heavyweight Championship, where he faced Yellow Dog to a no contest in the quarter-final. As a result, both men were eliminated from the tournament. Badd suffered his first pinfall loss on television on the September 5 Clash of the Champions XVI: Fall Brawl, where he was pinned by the United States Heavyweight Champion Sting. Badd continued his dominance with a win over Jimmy Garvin at Halloween Havoc and unsuccessfully challenged Brian Pillman for the Light Heavyweight Championship on the November 19 Clash of the Champions XVII.

On the December 22 episode of Main Event, Badd teamed with Diamond Studd to take on Tom Zenk and P. N. News in a tag team match, which Badd's team lost. After the match, Badd was attacked by Studd and Diamond Dallas Page until Zenk and News came to his rescue. As a result, Badd turned into a fan favorite. Badd made his first appearance at the company's flagship event Starrcade, where he was randomly placed with Arachnaman in a Lethal Lottery tag team match against Scott Steiner and Firebreaker Chip. Badd's team lost. Shortly after, he began using "Badd Blaster", a confetti gun that he would fire before his matches. Badd continued to rack up wins against the likes of Richard Morton and Tracy Smothers in the first half of 1992. He feuded with Page and his teammate Scotty Flamingo and the two competed in a series of televised and non-televised matches throughout 1992, including a boxing match on the November 18 Clash of the Champions XXI, which Flamingo won in the third round after Page filled Flamingo's boxing glove with water.

Mero got involved in a rivalry with Cactus Jack after the two were randomly placed as tag team partners via Lethal Lottery for Starrcade but failed to get along. The duo teamed for the first time on the December 26 episode of Saturday Night, where they defeated Tex Slazenger and Shanghai Pierce. They had a confrontation after the match, during which Jack delivered a double underhook DDT. At Starrcade, Mero's team lost in their Lethal Lottery match after Mero knocked Jack out with a Tutti Frutti. Mero faced Jack in a match on the January 13, 1993 Clash of the Champions XXII, where he lost. Badd began his next major program with Maxx Payne after Payne injured him with a Payne Killer on February 9. During this rivalry, Payne stole the Badd Blaster and Badd attempted to reclaim his gun. Badd lost a match to Payne by forfeit on the June 16 Clash of the Champions XXIII after Payne took him out with the Badd Blaster. Badd donned a mask due to the sustained injuries and faced Payne in a series of matches. He defeated Payne at the Beach Blast pay-per-view but lost to him in a no disqualification match on the July 31 episode of Saturday Night. Badd defeated Payne in a mask versus guitar match on the August 18 Clash of the Champions XXIV, to claim Payne's guitar. The two ended their feud on the October 30 episode of Saturday Night, where both men shook hands and buried the hatchet after a confrontation with Paul Orndorff.

Badd unsuccessfully challenged Lord Steven Regal for the WCW World Television Championship on the November 10 Clash of the Champions XXV. He was randomly paired with Brian Knobbs in a Lethal Lottery at the Battlebowl pay-per-view, where Badd's team won to qualify for the Battlebowl battle royal. He eliminated Rip Rogers before being eliminated by Paul Orndorff.

==== World Television Champion (1994–1996) ====
Badd received his first world championship opportunity on the February 12, 1994, episode of Saturday Night, where he challenged Rick Rude for the International World Heavyweight Championship in a losing effort. During this time, Badd formed a tag team with Michael Hayes and began a feud with Harlem Heat. Hayes turned on Badd during a no disqualification match against Harlem Heat on the February 19 episode of Saturday Night. As a result, Badd would be facing Hayes, the following night at SuperBrawl IV, where Hayes was replaced by Jimmy Garvin, whom Badd defeated. Badd began pursuing the United States Heavyweight Championship after he lost a tuxedo match against champion Steve Austin on the May 7 episode of WorldWide, after Col. Robert Parker pulled off Badd's pants. Badd faced Austin for the title in a losing effort at Slamboree Badd received another title shot on the June 23 Clash of the Champions XXVII, where Austin initially retained the title by pinning Badd after hitting him with a foreign object, but the referee reversed the decision, during which Badd pinned Austin. However, due to the controversial finish, Austin retained the title.

Badd substituted for the injured Sting as Lord Steven Regal's challenger for the World Television Championship at Bash at the Beach, where he failed to win the title. However, Badd remained in the title contention. Mero beat Regal for the title at Fall Brawl to gain his first singles championship in WCW. Badd made his first successful title defense against Bobby Eaton on the October 1 episode of WorldWide. He retained the title in major title defenses against The Honky Tonk Man at Halloween Havoc and the November 16 Clash of the Champions XXIX. Badd was scheduled to defend the title against Honky for a third time at Starrcade '94: Triple Threat but Honky left the company before the event and was replaced by Arn Anderson, whom Badd defeated to retain the title. Badd dropped the title to Anderson on the January 8, 1995, episode of Main Event. Badd failed to win the title in subsequent rematches on the January 25 Clash of the Champions XXX, February 18 episode of Saturday Night and February 19 episode of Main Event. Badd defeated Anderson in a boxer-versus-wrestler match at Uncensored to end the rivalry.

Badd competed in the mid-card throughout 1995, until he defeated Brian Pillman to become the #1 contender for the United States Heavyweight Championship at Fall Brawl. Badd received his title shot on the September 30 episode of Saturday Night against Sting, but failed to appear as he had been attacked by the Television Champion Diamond Dallas Page. Badd faced and defeated Page to win his second World Television Championship at Halloween Havoc. Badd defended the title against Page at the inaugural World War 3 pay-per-view, with the stipulation that if Badd won, he would gain Page's Diamond Doll as his valet. Badd defeated Page to retain the title and won the services of Kimberly, but he freed her. She continued to be in Badd's corner and the rivalry with Page continued. Badd defeated Page to retain the title at SuperBrawl VI in 1996. Badd lost the World Television Championship to Lex Luger during a house show on February 17, but defeated Luger to regain the title on February 18. He lost the title to Luger again on the March 9 episode of Saturday Night, after Page delivered a Diamond Cutter to Badd on the floor. This was Badd's final appearance in WCW. He left the company because he strongly objected to the ongoing angle with Kimberly Page.

=== World Wrestling Federation (1996–1999) ===
==== Intercontinental Champion (1996–1997) ====
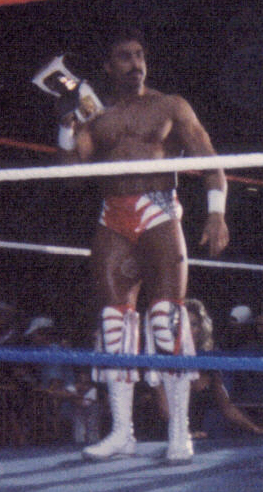
Mero in the ring in 1996

After leaving WCW, he immediately signed a contract with the World Wrestling Federation (WWF), where he began competing under his real name because WCW acquired the rights to the Johnny B. Badd name. He debuted in WWF as a fan favorite at WrestleMania XII, on March 31, 1996, where he rescued his wife, Rena "Sable" Mero from Hunter Hearst Helmsley. Mero made his in-ring debut, the following night on Monday Night Raw, where he defeated Isaac Yankem DDS. The following night after his in-ring debut on Action Zone, he partnered with Ahmed Johnson to take on Camp Cornette at the San Diego Sports Arena. Beginning with the April 15 episode of Raw, Sable began accompanying Mero to the ring during his matches with various outfits and whips and he adopted the nickname and a Jungle Gimmick called "Wildman", Both Mero and Sable adopted the nickname World Wrestling Federation's 1 2 Punch . Mero defeated Helmsley in his pay-per-view debut at In Your House 8. Mero qualified for the King of the Ring tournament by defeating Skip on the June 10 episode of Raw. He defeated Owen Hart in the quarter-final, the following week on Raw, but lost to eventual winner Stone Cold Steve Austin in the semi-final at King of the Ring. Mero began a rivalry with Goldust after Goldust won a match between the pair on the July 1 episode of Raw. Mero faced Goldust in a losing effort at the SummerSlam pay-per-view.

On the September 6 episode of Raw, Mero participated in a tournament for the Intercontinental Championship, which was vacated by Ahmed Johnson due to injury. Mero defeated Stone Cold Steve Austin, Owen Hart and Faarooq to win the title on September 23 episode of Raw. Mero successfully defended the title against Goldust, with the assistance of Mr. Perfect at In Your House 10. He dropped the title to rival Hunter Hearst Helmsley, the following night on Raw after Perfect goaded Mero into defending the title against Helmsley and hit him with a steel chair. Mero led a team of Jake Roberts, The Stalker and newcomer Rocky Maivia against Helmsley, Crush, Goldust and Jerry Lawler in a four-on-four elimination tag team match at Survivor Series. Mero was eliminated by Crush but his team won the match. Mero faced Helmsley for the Intercontinental Championship at In Your House 12, where Mero won by count-out.

Mero participated in the 1997 Royal Rumble match as the #16 entrant. He was eliminated by the eventual winner Stone Cold Steve Austin. On the February 3 episode of Raw, Mero received his last opportunity for the Intercontinental Championship against Hunter Hearst Helmsley, where he failed to win the title. Later that month, he tore his anterior cruciate ligament, and spent seven months rehabilitating.

==== Feud with Sable and departure (1997–1999) ====
Mero returned to WWF television on the October 6 episode of Raw is War, where he dropped the Little Richard look and cut his hair and trimmed his facial hair and became "Marvelous Marc Mero" a pun on Marvelous Marvin Hagler and was a boxer and wrestler mashup. He debuted a new finishing move, TKO to win his match against Miguel Pérez, Jr. Mero began a slow turn as a villain after becoming jealous of the fans following Sable had acquired in his absence and wanting her out of the WWF. During this time, he faced boxer Butterbean in a toughman contest at D-Generation X: In Your House, which he lost by disqualification.

As 1998 began, Mero's obsession with Sable continued, which led to a temporary alliance with Goldust and his valet, Luna Vachon, in which the three humiliated Sable during matches, but it turned into a short feud when Goldust became physical with Sable. At WrestleMania XIV, Mero and Sable defeated Goldust and Luna in a mixed tag team match. The storyline was resolved in a match between Mero and Sable at Over the Edge, in which Mero feigned remorse, offering to lie down and allow her to pin him, before defeating Sable with an inside cradle, which resulted in her leaving the WWF for a short time and Mero completed his villainous turn. After he dropped Sable as his valet, Jacqueline became his manager. However, his association with Jacqueline did not prove to be successful as he failed to qualify for the King of the Ring tournament against Jeff Jarrett on the June 22 episode of Raw is War and competed in the Brawl for All on the following week's episode of Raw is War, where he was defeated by Steve Blackman in the first round. Mero and Jacqueline faced Sable and newcomer Edge in a mixed tag team match at SummerSlam, which Mero lost after Edge dropped Sable on him to pin him for the victory. Mero's misfortunes continued when he failed to regain the Intercontinental Championship after losing to Val Venis in a tournament in October. Jacqueline's interventions in matches soon ended up costing Mero several victories and he ultimately fired her after losing to Big Boss Man on the November 22 episode of Sunday Night Heat.

Mero's last appearance on WWF television in the United States was on the November 30 episode of Raw is War, where he faced Light Heavyweight Champion Duane Gill. He promised to retire if he did not win the match. Gill won the match with the help of The J.O.B. Squad. He wrestled one final time at the United Kingdom-exclusive pay-per-view Capital Carnage, where he teamed with Jacqueline as a reluctant partner against Sable and Christian in a losing effort. In 1999, both Mero and Sable left the WWF. At the time, Mero had three years remaining on his contract, with a guaranteed salary of $350,000. Mero subsequently did not wrestle for 18 months due to various nagging injuries and a shoulder surgery.

=== Return to WCW (2000) ===
On April 26, 2000, Mero returned to World Championship Wrestling, appearing with his trainer, Ray Rinaldi, in the audience on an episode of WCW Thunder and confronting Tank Abbott. Mero opted not to return to WCW on a full-time basis due to his physical condition at the time.

=== X Wrestling Federation (2001–2002) ===
In 2001, Mero returned to wrestling in the short-lived X Wrestling Federation (XWF) along with Rena Mero (Sable). They remained with the company until its closure in 2002.

=== NWA Total Nonstop Action (2004–2005) ===
In 2004, Mero began wrestling for NWA Total Nonstop Action (NWA TNA) reprising his Johnny B. Badd character without a moustache and long hair. He debuted in TNA on the October 2, 2004 episode of Xplosion, where he participated as a fan favorite in a tag team match with Russ Rollins against Rod Steele and Bruce Steele, which Badd's team won. After the match, Badd smashed Jeff Jarrett's guitar on Rollins' head, thus turning into a villain. However, his villainous turn was short-lived as he turned back into a fan favorite during his Impact! debut on November 5, where he defeated Vito Thomaselli. He appeared with the company sporadically throughout late 2004 and early 2005. He competed at the company's first monthly pay-per-view Victory Road, where he participated in an eight-man tag team match, which his team won. Badd's most notable moment during his TNA career took place on the November 19 episode of Impact!, when he defeated Raven, with the help of Diamond Dallas Page. Badd then appeared at the Turning Point pay-per-view in December, where he teamed with Pat Kenney against Glen Gilberti and Johnny Swinger in a tag team match, which Mero's team won. His last televised match in TNA was a six-man tag team match on the December 31 episode of Impact!, where his team was victorious. He made his last appearance in TNA at the pre-show of the Final Resolution pay-per-view on January 16, 2005, where he was paired with Sonny Siaki in a tag team match against The Naturals, which Naturals won.

=== Retirement (2006) ===
Mero retired from in-ring competition in 2006, opening and operating the Marc Mero Body Slam Training Institute in Altamonte Springs, Florida. Today, Marc Mero contributes much of his time to the nonprofit organization he founded in 2007, Champion of Choices.

== Personal life ==
In 1994, Mero married Rena "Sable" Greek, adopting her daughter from a previous marriage. The couple separated in mid-2003 and divorced amicably in 2004. Marc married for the second time in 2009, to Darlene Spezzi; the couple divorced in 2019. On December 13, 2025, Marc wed a third time when he married his partner Malissa in a private ceremony.

In July 2007, Mero stated that he required a heart valve transplant. Mero had announced that he was prepared to undergo heart surgery in November 2014, however tests revealed that his enlarged heart had shrunk. Mero claims that doctors believe he will still need surgery someday.

During a Mother's Day Presentation, Mero states that he has overdosed three times and nearly died.

Mero's first book, How To Be the Happiest Person on the Planet, was released on December 6, 2010. His second book, Badd To Good: The Inspiring Story Of A Wrestling Wildman, was released on March 3, 2025.

Upon former U.S. President Jimmy Carter's death in December 2024, Mero produced photo evidence of him meeting with Carter in 1993.

=== Steroid usage in wrestling ===
In June and July 2007, Mero commented on the Chris Benoit murder-suicide, appearing on numerous cable news programs and criticizing both the wrestling industry and World Wrestling Entertainment. In an interview with WFTV, Mero admitted to using both anabolic steroids and recreational drugs over a period of seven years and claimed that steroids had contributed to the early deaths of many wrestlers. In interviews, Mero produced a list of 25 (later expanded to 31) wrestlers with whom he had wrestled and who had since died, calling for greater regulation of the wrestling industry.

Mero's comments attracted criticism from WWE employees such as Mr. Kennedy, who labelled him a "goof" and a "silly bastard", and Fit Finlay, who claimed Mero had "nothing to do with this business". On July 15, 2007, Mero attended the memorials of Nancy and Daniel Benoit in Daytona Beach, Florida. Following his comments, Mero began making appearances at schools in Central Florida and lecturing on the dangers of drug abuse and bullying; he also promotes a similar-interests website with which he is affiliated. As of April 2, 2009, he has had many appearances in schools and community colleges across The United States.

== Brawl For All record ==
Professional record breakdown
2 matches	0 wins	2 losses
By knockout	0	0
By submission	0	0
By decision	0	2

Res.	Record	Opponent	Method	Event	Date	Round	Time	Location	Notes
Loss	0–2	Bradshaw	Decision	WWF Raw is War #272	August 10, 1998	3	1:00	Omaha, Nebraska, U.S.	WWF Brawl for All second round.
Loss	0–1	Steve Blackman	Decision	WWF Raw is War #266	June 28, 1998	3	1:00	Cleveland, Ohio, U.S.	WWF Brawl for All first round. Blackman withdrew after the first round due to injuries, and Mero advanced as his replacement.

== Championships and accomplishments ==
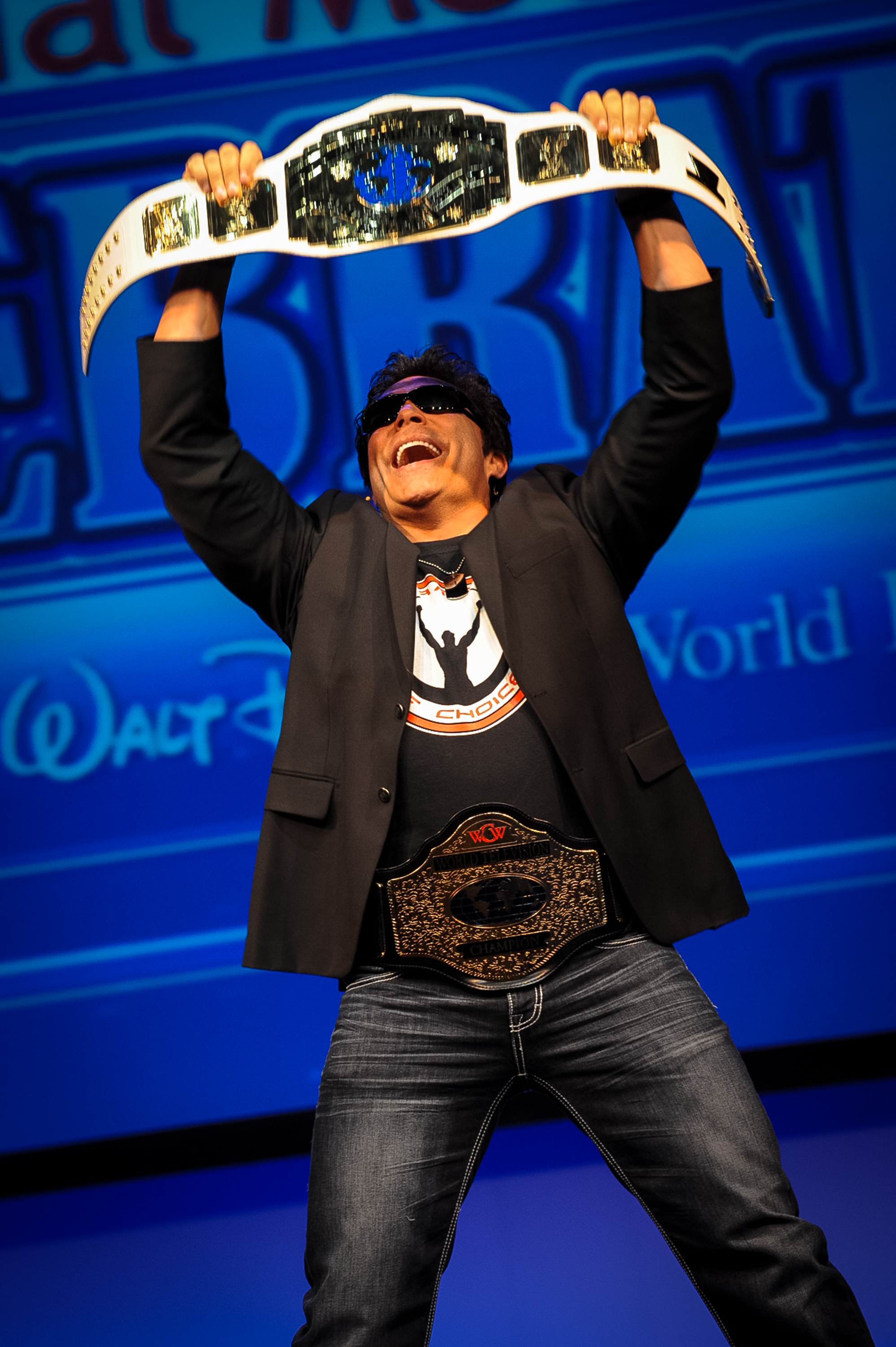
Mero was a one-time WWF Intercontinental Champion and three-time WCW World Television Champion and is seen here with replicas of both belts

=== Amateur boxing ===
- New York State Titles
  - Amateur Athletic Union
  - Empire State Games
  - New York Golden Gloves (3 consecutive years)

=== Professional wrestling ===
- International Professional Wrestling Hall of Fame
  - Class of 2026 (Rocky Johnson Medal of Mettle)
- Pro Wrestling Illustrated
  - Rookie of the Year (1991)
  - Ranked No. 43 of the top 500 singles wrestlers in the PWI 500 in 1996
  - Ranked No. 264 of the top 500 singles wrestlers in the PWI Years in 2003
- World Championship Wrestling
  - WCW World Television Championship (3 times)
  - World Cup Of Wrestling (1995) – with Randy Savage, Lex Luger, Sting, Eddie Guerrero, Chris Benoit, and Alex Wright
- World Wrestling Federation
  - WWF Intercontinental Championship (1 time)
- Wrestling Observer Newsletter
  - Most Improved Wrestler (1995)
  - Rookie of the Year (1991)
