= WrestleMania XV =

1999 World Wrestling Federation pay-per-view event

- Promotional poster featuring various WWF wrestlers
- Promotion: World Wrestling Federation
- Date: March 28, 1999
- City: Philadelphia, Pennsylvania
- Venue: First Union Center
- Attendance: 20,276
- Buy rate: North America: 800,000
- Tagline: The Ragin' Climax

Pay-per-view chronology
← Previous; St. Valentine's Day Massacre: In Your House	Next → Backlash

WrestleMania chronology
← Previous; XIV	Next → 2000

WrestleMania XV was a 1999 professional wrestling pay-per-view (PPV) event produced by the World Wrestling Federation (WWF, renamed WWE in 2002). It was the 15th annual WrestleMania and took place on March 28, 1999, at the First Union Center in Philadelphia, Pennsylvania. The ticket sales of 20,276 drew a gross of $1,437,050.

Ten professional wrestling matches were scheduled on the event's card. The main event saw the challenger "Stone Cold" Steve Austin face The Rock in a no disqualification match for the WWF Championship. The penultimate match saw The Undertaker wrestle Big Boss Man in a Hell in a Cell match. Lower on the card, six of the promotion's seven active championships at the time were defended, including the first WrestleMania defense of the Hardcore Championship. Also on the undercard was a Brawl for All match, an unscripted type of shootfight between wrestler Bart Gunn and boxer/mixed martial artist Butterbean. This event also marked the final WWF appearance for Gorilla Monsoon, who died in October.

== Production ==
=== Background ===
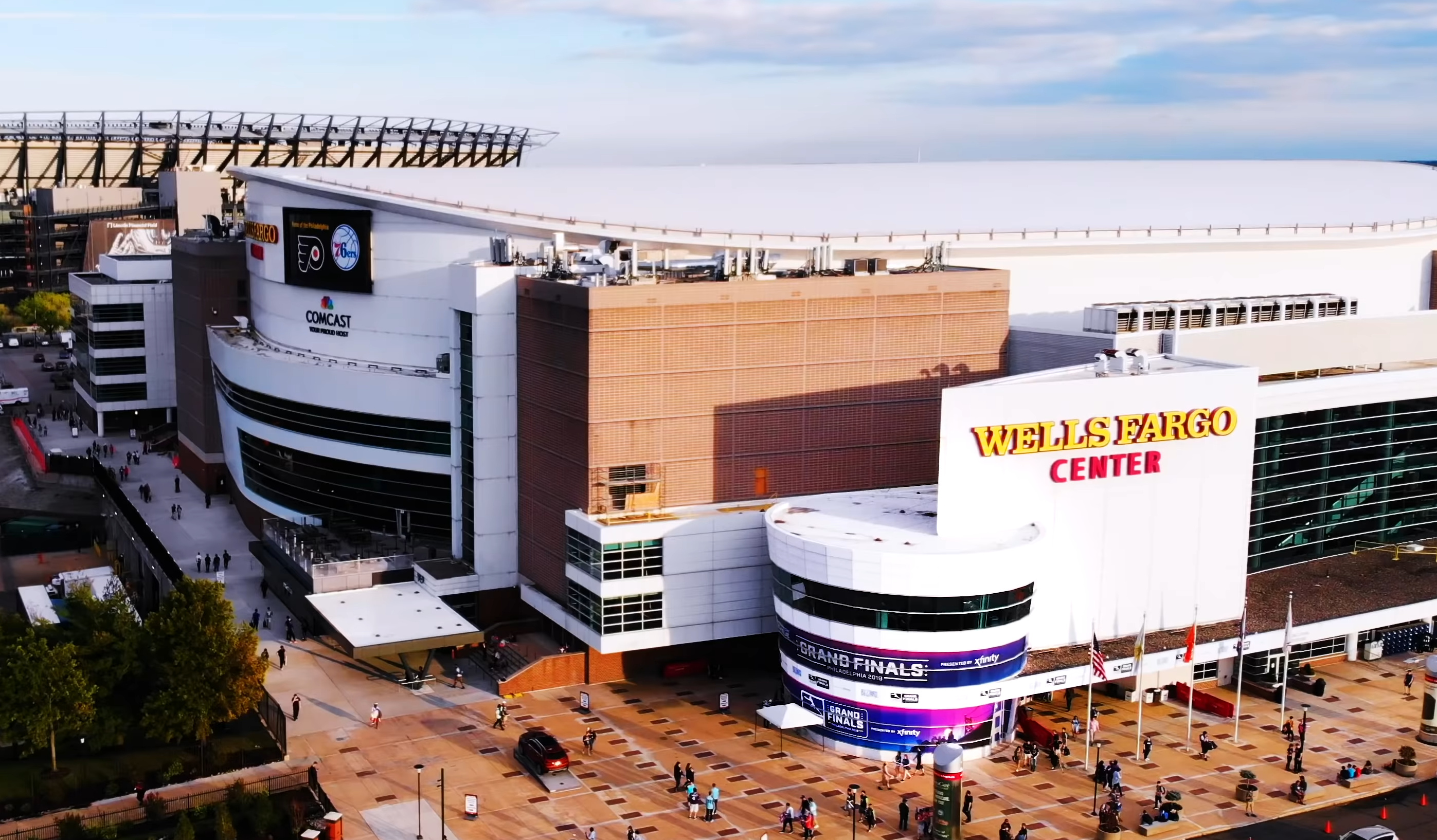
The 15th annual WrestleMania was held in Philadelphia, Pennsylvania at the First Union Center (pictured in 2019 after it had since been renamed as Wells Fargo Center).

WrestleMania is the World Wrestling Federation's (WWF, renamed WWE in 2002) flagship professional wrestling pay-per-view (PPV) event, having first been held in 1985. It has become the longest-running professional wrestling event in history and is held annually between mid-March to mid-April. It was the first of the WWF's original four PPVs, which includes Royal Rumble, SummerSlam, and Survivor Series, referred to as the "Big Four", and was considered one of the "Big Five" PPVs with the addition of King of the Ring in 1993. WrestleMania XV was scheduled to be held on March 28, 1999, at the First Union Center in Philadelphia, Pennsylvania.

=== Storylines ===
When Road Dogg Jesse James and "Bad Ass" Billy Gunn lost the WWF Tag Team Championship to The Corporation, they tried their hand at singles wrestling for some time. Gunn failed in his attempts to win the WWF Intercontinental Championship, but Road Dogg would become Hardcore Champion until an injury prevented him from honoring a championship match with Al Snow. Snow ended up fighting himself and then Bob Holly for the vacant belt at St. Valentine's Day Massacre: In Your House, with Holly winning the title at the banks of the Mississippi River. When Road Dogg won the Intercontinental Championship on Raw Is War Gunn fought Holly (now dubbed as Hardcore Holly) and won when Holly crashed into an ad-hoc announcers table Jim Ross had constructed for his pirate broadcast of the show.

In the previous year, due to the suddenly enlarged roster, a shootfighting (unscripted) knockout tournament entitled Brawl for All was organized on a voluntary basis, with Bart Gunn winning the tournament on August 24 after defeating every opponent by knockout aside from his opening-round opponent Bob Holly. When Holly rechristened himself Hardcore Holly on February 15, decrying poor gimmicks and tag-team partners he had been given in the past, Gunn made his first appearance since winning the tournament, to remind Holly that not all his partners were of a poor caliber. This led to a hardcore match between the two, which Gunn dominated until a masked assailant, revealed to be "Dr. Death" Steve Williams, threw him off the stage. Williams claimed he did this out of revenge for losing to Gunn in the Brawl for All. The week after on Raw Is War, Williams' manager Jim Ross announced to Gunn he would be facing noted mixed martial artist and boxer Eric "Butterbean" Esch, who held a 43–1–1 record at the time, who challenged him to a Brawl for All fight.

From November's Survivor Series until the night after St. Valentine's Day Massacre, The Rock and Mankind (Mick Foley) traded the WWF Championship numerous times as Mr. McMahon screwed Mankind time and time again on his quest to headline WrestleMania. In their final match, a ladder match on Raw Is War, Paul Wight delivered the Showstopper to Mankind as he was about to win the match, removing his chances of appearing in the main event of WrestleMania. However, as Mr. McMahon's conspiracy of appointing Big Show as special guest referee to secure The Rock as champion began to fall apart, Mankind constantly offered his services as a second official. With The Rock and Big Show causing infighting in the Corporation, Mankind successfully canvassed for a chance to referee; rather than have two conflicting referees, a match was booked to give the winner the right to officiate the main event match.

When Ryan Shamrock (Alicia Webb) appeared front row on Raw Is War on January 11, she gained attention not only from her (kayfabe) brother Ken Shamrock, but also Val Venis (who performed a flirtatious dance for her) and "Badd Ass" Billy Gunn (who lived up to his moniker by mooning her). Enraged, Ken Shamrock fought Gunn at the Royal Rumble, then Venis at St. Valentine's Day Massacre, with Venis winning the Intercontinental Championship thanks to help from Ryan. Venis soon dumped Ryan, and she began a relationship with Goldust (Dustin Rhodes). Venis also unwittingly lost his championship to Road Dogg on Raw Is War and found himself defending his championship against the important men in Ryan Shamrock's life in a four-corners elimination match.

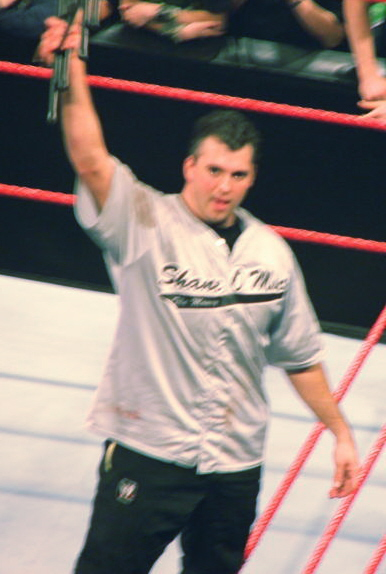
Shane McMahon defended the European Championship

After The Rock won his "I Quit" match against Mankind at the Royal Rumble by playing a recording of his voice, Triple H demanded an I Quit match of his own, but as he was about to put Rock through the announcers table, The Corporation came to the ring and Kane held his manager/girlfriend Chyna hostage, demanding that he quit the match. As soon as the match was over, Chyna low blowed Triple H and revealed her alliances with The Corporation, promising a Valentine's Day present at the subsequent pay-per-view. Despite almost having the match won, Triple H suffered at the hands of an interfering Shane McMahon and illegal man Kane's chokeslam. Triple H took revenge on the February 22 Raw Is War by interfering in X-Pac's (Sean Waltman) match with Chyna, causing her to lose. Chyna called Triple H out on March 8, but before they could fight, Kane came to the ring. Chyna held up Triple H as Kane shot a fireball at him, though he would duck out of the way causing (kayfabe) severe retinal damage to Chyna. Despite not receiving any damage, Triple H maintained that the fireball was meant for him, an insult he took personally and an intended injury he wanted to return at WrestleMania. On March 22, Kane prepared to have a match against Goldust, but as he threw off his entrance robes and wig, it turned out he was Triple H holding a flamethrower, shooting flames in Kane's face. Meanwhile, X-Pac, who had altercations with Shane McMahon prior to the February event, was frustrated with Shane's interference in the match and goaded into putting his European Championship on the line in a tag-team match with Triple H against Kane and Shane, which Shane won thanks to Triple H being distracted by Chyna. With Shane claiming himself to be a fighting champion, he agreed to a rematch at WrestleMania, but regularly interfered in X-Pac's matches up until that point, culminating in a Greenwich Street Fight on March 22 that ended in a no-contest when the Mean Street Posse ambushed X-Pac and drove off with Shane in their car.

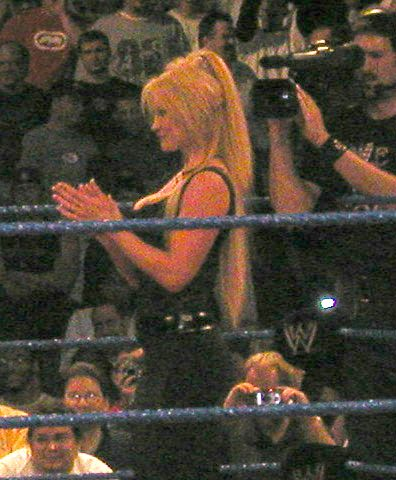
Sable defended the WWF Women's Championship against Tori

Tori was sitting front row as a plant as early as September 14's Raw Is War, but it was not until late December that she began to act with stalker tendencies, sending flowers and notes to Sable, the Women's Champion and even helping her to defend her title against Luna Vachon at the Royal Rumble. On Raw Is War the night after the previous pay-per-view, Tori invaded the ring again and was publicly shouted at and humiliated by Sable. Vachon then brought Tori to the ring a fortnight after, reprimanding Sable for her ego, but a still-obsessed Tori helped attack Vachon. The following week on March 8's Raw Is War, Tori fought Vachon with Sable in her corner but after receiving a squash from Vachon, Sable also gave Tori a Sable Bomb, leading to Tori interrupting Sable's Playboy interview by demanding a championship match at WrestleMania.

Having been buried alive in a Royal Rumble qualification match at Rock Bottom: In Your House, The Undertaker disappeared from television while The Acolytes, Faarooq (Ron Simmons) and Bradshaw (John Layfield), began to act strangely, eventually abducting Dennis Knight and leaving him tied up in a darkened room. On January 11, The Undertaker returned in slightly new attire, taking a seat in a ceremonial throne on the Raw Is War stage while Paul Bearer stood beside him and The Acolytes brought Knight out and tied him to a table. There, Undertaker performed a ritualistic ceremony, rechristening him as Mideon. Undertaker began delivering ambiguous apocalyptic messages, but after recruiting Mabel, now Viscera (Nelson Frazier, Jr.) and The Brood, he began to be more direct, revealing his plan to attack McMahon and take over the World Wrestling Federation.

The security of Mr. McMahon's Corporation, Big Boss Man, challenged the Ministry to a six-man tag team match, which ended in a no-contest when the Ministry abducted Shane McMahon and took him to Undertaker, who threatened him while choking him then gave him a letter to give to his father. Vince McMahon replied the following week on February 22 by booking The Undertaker in an Inferno match with Kane on Raw Is War, the first network television airing of that type of match. During the match, McMahon provided commentary, nonchalantly revealing he had placed Undertaker in a Hell in a Cell match against Big Boss Man for WrestleMania. During the match, Paul Bearer gave an ominous gift to McMahon, a teddy bear. After Undertaker set Kane on fire, he turned to the enraged McMahon, taking the teddy bear (later revealed to belong to Stephanie McMahon) and setting it alight, reducing Vince to his knees as he burst into tears. Trying to defeat either of his problems, McMahon declared he'd never show such weakness again and put Mankind against Undertaker, which ended with Undertaker almost chokeslamming McMahon through the announcers table until Boss Man saved him.

Undertaker continued with his mind games on March 8, ordering his Ministry to look for Boss Man all night and attacking any innocents in his way, eventually capturing Boss Man and crucifying him. Boss Man managed to escape while police were being beaten off by Undertaker's minions until he offered himself to the police while being derided by McMahon. The following week he continued his assault, with videos playing throughout the evening of the Ministry at McMahon's mansion ending in McMahon coming to the ring while Triple H brawled with Kane, begging Kane to help him. Kane ripped off his mask to reveal it was actually The Undertaker who grabbed McMahon by the throat as the lights turned off in the arena and when they came up, he was gone with McMahon alone in the ring.

The main event of the evening was another chapter in the ongoing rivalry between "Stone Cold" Steve Austin and McMahon, which dated back to when Austin won the Royal Rumble in 1998. After Austin won the WWF Championship at WrestleMania XIV, McMahon set on a six-month-long quest to take the championship from him. With the exception of a one day reign by Kane, who won the championship in a First Blood Match at King of the Ring when his (kayfabe) brother The Undertaker caused Austin to bleed first, Austin thwarted each attempt by McMahon until Breakdown: In Your House in September 1998 when Austin defended the championship against Undertaker and Kane in what was billed as a triple threat match. McMahon added a stipulation, however, that neither brother could pin the other to win the match; this led to both men simultaneously pinning Austin, causing him to lose the match and the championship. This had been part of a deal McMahon had made with the two men to protect him from Austin, with the reward of the championship if they were successful. However, McMahon went back on his word after Austin attacked him on the next night's Raw and announced he was forcing Undertaker and Kane to wrestle for the vacant championship at Judgment Day: In Your House. He also named Austin the special guest referee, hoping to humiliate him by forcing him to declare a new champion. Austin, however, had other ideas and counted both men out, declaring himself the winner of the match and leaving the championship vacant.

A Deadly Games tournament was scheduled for Survivor Series in November, in which it turned out that The Rock, not Mankind, was McMahon's choice for winner and had the tournament manipulated to his advantage, while Austin lost in a match when McMahon's son Shane, acting as referee, refused to count a pinfall to go to the finals. Knowing Rock would be busy feuding with Mankind, McMahon realized Austin was likely to use the 1999 Royal Rumble, rather than a personal attack, to attempt to reclaim the belt and laid down the stipulation that he must win a Buried Alive match against The Undertaker to be in the Rumble. When he did, with some help from Kane, McMahon further tried to prevent Austin winning back the championship by "randomly" drawing him as the first entrant in the Rumble and drawing himself as the 30th. However, WWF commissioner Shawn Michaels declared that due to entering the Rumble match, McMahon was now an active WWF competitor, meaning Michaels had full reign over him. Michaels then declared that McMahon would be not be entering the Rumble match as the 30th participant, but instead would be entered into the Rumble match as the second entrant, meaning McMahon and Austin would start the match against one another. McMahon would later try to incentivize other wrestlers to eliminate Austin by placing a $100,000 bounty on him during the Royal Rumble match.

Despite this, Austin (and, for that matter, McMahon) managed to stay in the match to the very end, although this was mostly due to him and McMahon leaving the ring at various points to brawl around the arena. At one point during the match, McMahon lured Austin backstage into an ambush from The Corporation, leading Austin to be taken away in an ambulance while McMahon returned ringside and provided commentary. Austin eventually returned to the match, however, and began eliminating other competitors before finally getting his hands on McMahon. Late in the match, The Rock, who earlier in the evening had regained the WWF Championship, came to the ring and started arguing with Austin. McMahon took advantage of the distraction and threw Austin over the top rope, thus winning the match. As he was officially now the winner of the Royal Rumble, McMahon was entitled to face whomever the WWF Champion was at WrestleMania. On the following night's episode of Raw, however, he announced that, since he was only a part-timer and the champion was a fellow Corporation member in The Rock, that he had filed paperwork relinquishing his WrestleMania championship opportunity and that he would be naming a replacement later in the evening. To his chagrin, Austin and Michaels informed him shortly thereafter that, according to the rules, his actions resulted in Austin, as the runner-up in the Royal Rumble, taking his place.

With McMahon irate, Austin revealed he was willing to put his title shot on the line and not headline WrestleMania if McMahon would give him the opportunity to fight him one on one with no interference from The Corporation; if McMahon could beat him, Austin would not go to WrestleMania. Their steel cage match at St. Valentine's Day Massacre mostly consisted of McMahon running away, but eventually the two fought with Austin winning the match under unusual circumstances when Big Show made his debut, coming from under the ring and throwing Austin into the cage with the walls of it coming open, meaning Austin had inadvertently won.

== Event ==
Other on-screen personnel
Role:	Name:
Commentator	Michael Cole (also Heat)
Commentator	Jerry Lawler
Commentator	Jim Ross (Main Event)
Commentator	Carlos Cabrera (Spanish)
Commentator	Hugo Savinovich (Spanish)
Commentator	Owen Hart (battle royal only)
Commentator	Jeff Jarrett (battle royal only)
Commentator	Terri Runnels (Ivory v. Jacqueline)
Interviewer	Kevin Kelly (also Heat)
Ring announcer	Howard Finkel
Referees	Mike Chioda
Referees	Earl Hebner
Referees	Jim Korderas
Referees	Theodore Long
Referees	Tim White
Referees	Vinny Pazienza (Brawl For All)
Brawl For All Judges	Gorilla Monsoon
Brawl For All Judges	Chuck Wepner
Brawl For All Judges	Kevin Rooney

=== Pre-show ===
The event was marked with a Rage Party the preceding evening at the Pennsylvania Convention Center, playing on the tagline of the event, much like Fan Axess that would come in later years. It included music from Isaac Hayes, Big Pun, and the Cherry Poppin' Daddies.

During the Sunday Night Heat pre-show, Jacqueline pinned Ivory after a back suplex. After the match, Terri Runnels burned her cigar into Ivory's cheek. The second Heat match saw a 21-man battle royal match with the last two competitors becoming a tag team for the evening to face the Tag Team Championship holders. In the event, D'Lo Brown and Test were the last two, still fighting without realizing the match was over when Droz and The Godfather eliminated each other. The show officially began with Boyz II Men singing "America the Beautiful" in the ring before the opening video.

=== Preliminary matches ===
The inaugural WrestleMania Hardcore Championship match began with Al Snow striking Billy Gunn as he tried to make a pre-match speech. With Gunn in the corner, Snow fought with Hardcore Holly outside the ring, wrapping his neck in cable but, after some fighting from Gunn, Holly was able to suplex Snow. After Gunn again interjected himself, Snow was able to go underneath the mat to find some weapons including a Philadelphia Flyers hockey stick much to the delight of the crowd. The match ended when Gunn put Snow through a table in the corner, originally intended for Gunn and then used the Fameasser on Snow, driving him into a chair on the mat. As the referee counted, Holly struck Gunn with a weapon, quickly covering Snow to steal his second championship reign.

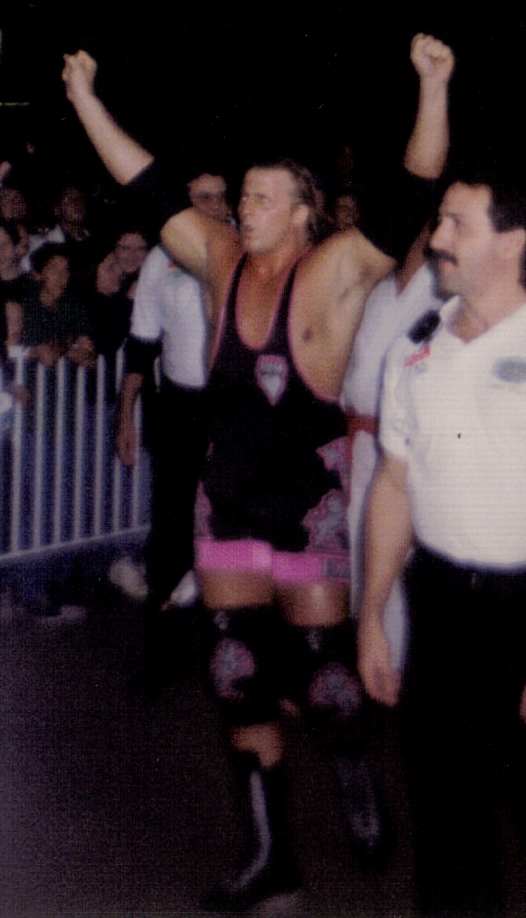
Owen Hart had his third WrestleMania WWF Tag Team Championship match

The WWF Tag Team Championship match began with Jeff Jarrett and D'Lo Brown exchanging running maneuvers before both tagging in their respective partners, at which point Test used a pumphandle slam on Owen Hart, but tried again after a failed pin attempt only to be met with an enziguiri and then the Sharpshooter. Brown came in illegally to break it up but was tagged in straight afterward, dominating both Hart and Jarrett with power slams and dropkicks, almost winning the match after a Sky High that was broken up by Jarrett. Referee Jimmy Korderas was distracted when Debra came to the apron to distract Brown only to be pulled down by Ivory, at which point PMS (Terri and Jacqueline) arrived and all of them began to fight while Test tried to pull them apart. With everyone distracted, Hart missile dropkicked Brown allowing Jarrett to roll Brown up and sit on him, securing a pin count.

The Brawl For All match began with the two meetings in the middle, Gunn running into some blows from Butterbean. The two traded punches, neither man managing to contact properly until Butterbean shook Gunn with a left-hand jab followed by a right hook which stunned Gunn allowing Bean to corner him, giving him another right hook which knocked him down. Gunn immediately came back upon his knees but took advantage of the eight seconds before standing up fully. As the fight resumed, Butterbean jabbed Gunn to the body and followed with a clean overhand right which sent Gunn back to the canvas, giving Butterbean a victory via knockout. The match lasted a total of 34 seconds. This was followed with an appearance from the San Diego Chicken, who mocked special referee Vinny Pazienza and was punched to the floor for it.

On the WWF WrestleMania special on HSN later during the pay per view, after the Shane McMahon match, "Dr. Death" Steve Williams cut a promo on Bart Gunn in a backstage interview with Jim Ross by his side, saying that Butterbean's punch "wasn't lucky" and that "Bart deserved what he got", telling the viewer to keep watching WWF because "the Doctor hasn't finished his job yet". This was in hopes of setting up an angle between Williams and Gunn, and to continue building Williams as a credible midcarder. However, because of Gunn being released, their feud instead carried over to All Japan Pro Wrestling in the early 2000s, where in Japan the Brawl For All was better received.

Next up was the match between Mankind and the Big Show, where the winner would earn the right to officiate the WWF Championship match later in the evening. As Mankind entered the ring he was immediately headbutted out, but as Big Show followed him out, Mankind slammed Show's head into the steel steps. He then tried a double-armed DDT into the steps but was shoved over the steps falling backward. Show dominated Mankind in the ring afterward, using his sheer size to punch and throw Mankind, with Mankind eventually being tied up in the ropes, which allowed him to back body drop Show out of the ring. Mankind then took out Mr. Socko, a smelly gym sock, and stuffed the foul-smelling sock into the Big Show's mouth with the mandible claw three times. The third claw came with a low blow, for which Mankind was not disqualified. When Show stood back up, he had Mankind on his back with the sock in his mouth and jumped backward so that his entire body landed on Mankind, breaking up the hold. As the two recovered, Show kicked his opponent out of the ring, grabbing a steel chair and thrusting it into Mankind's chest then hitting it over his back. Big Show threw that chair and another in the ring, setting them both in seated positions and Show Stopping Mankind through the middle of them. At this point Earl Hebner finally decided to disqualify Big Show, with Show taking out his anger by attacking Mankind more with the chair. Mr. McMahon made his way to the ring afterward, berating Big Show for risking the WWF Championship match at which point Show grabbed him by the throat. He then thought better of it and released him, only to be met with another tirade from McMahon and a slap, causing Show to punch McMahon and knock him out.

The four corners Intercontinental match began with Ken Shamrock and Road Dogg in the ring, with the latter being thrown from corner to corner until Goldust tagged his way in, with running shoulder barges that floored Shamrock. Shamrock tagged in Venis who came in and instantly attacked Shamrock until Goldust backdropped him. Goldust tried the Curtain Call, but Venis flipped over Goldust's back only to be knocked down again by a clothesline from Goldust, who then put Venis on the turnbuckle and attempted a superplex. Venis fought back and replied with a diving bulldog following with a fisherman suplex pin which only resulted in a two count. The two then collided in the turnbuckle, causing Goldust to fall down and Venis to fall on him, headbutting his crotch. Shamrock took a blind tag from Road Dogg, after he replaced Goldust, immediately putting an ankle lock until Venis grabbed the bottom rope. As Venis grabbed the ropes to stand up again, Shamrock charged him but was tossed over the ropes as Ryan Shamrock insulted him. Venis went after Ken Shamrock and the two fought up the walkway with Shamrock running back to the ring, but not fast enough to avoid a double count-out. Shamrock, not accepting the decision belly to belly suplex slammed both competitors before leaving. When they recovered, Goldust Irish whipped Road Dogg but it was reversed. As Goldust ran into the ropes, he had his leg caught by Ryan Shamrock, seemingly trying to grab Road Dogg's leg. Road Dogg charged Goldust and was picked up for a powerslam, but managed to roll Goldust up with a small package, covering him for a successful three count.

Before Kane's match with Triple H, Kane entered the ring only to be attacked while he was performing his signature entrance by the San Diego Chicken. Kane fought back and unmasked the chicken, revealing it to be Pete Rose, trying to gain revenge for the previous year's incident, but receiving a Tombstone piledriver. Triple H also tried to ambush Kane by coming through the crowd while all eyes were on the stage entrance, hitting Kane out of the ring and then throwing him into the ring post and whipping him into the steel steps. Kane then picked Triple H up and straddled him on the crowd barrier, pushing him into the Mean Street Posse who were at ringside, picking him up again to ram his back into the steel post three times. Back inside the ring, Kane dominated Helmsley with his rough fighting style, using his foot to choke Triple H and knocking him down with clotheslines and punches until Triple H gained momentum from a reversal, smashing Kane's face into his knee. Kane was allowed time to recover when Triple H was distracted by Chyna coming to ringside. Triple H tried to Pedigree Kane as he stood up, but failed while Chyna pushed the steel steps into the ring. Kane picked them up and ran into Triple H, who used the turnbuckle to swing his feet up and kicked them back into Kane, causing Kane to stagger backward and drop them before smashing his face into the steps from a drop toe-hold. Triple H then clotheslined Kane out of the ring, following himself and attempting to Pedigree Kane on the steps but was backbody dropped. When they made it back into the ring, Kane chokeslammed Triple H while Chyna entered the ring with a steel chair, telling Kane she wanted to attack Triple H, but as Kane turned, Chyna hit him with the chair, causing him to corner her but again was hit with the chair, this time by Triple H, who followed it up with a Pedigree onto the chair. Chyna and Triple H celebrated the reunion of D-Generation X afterward.

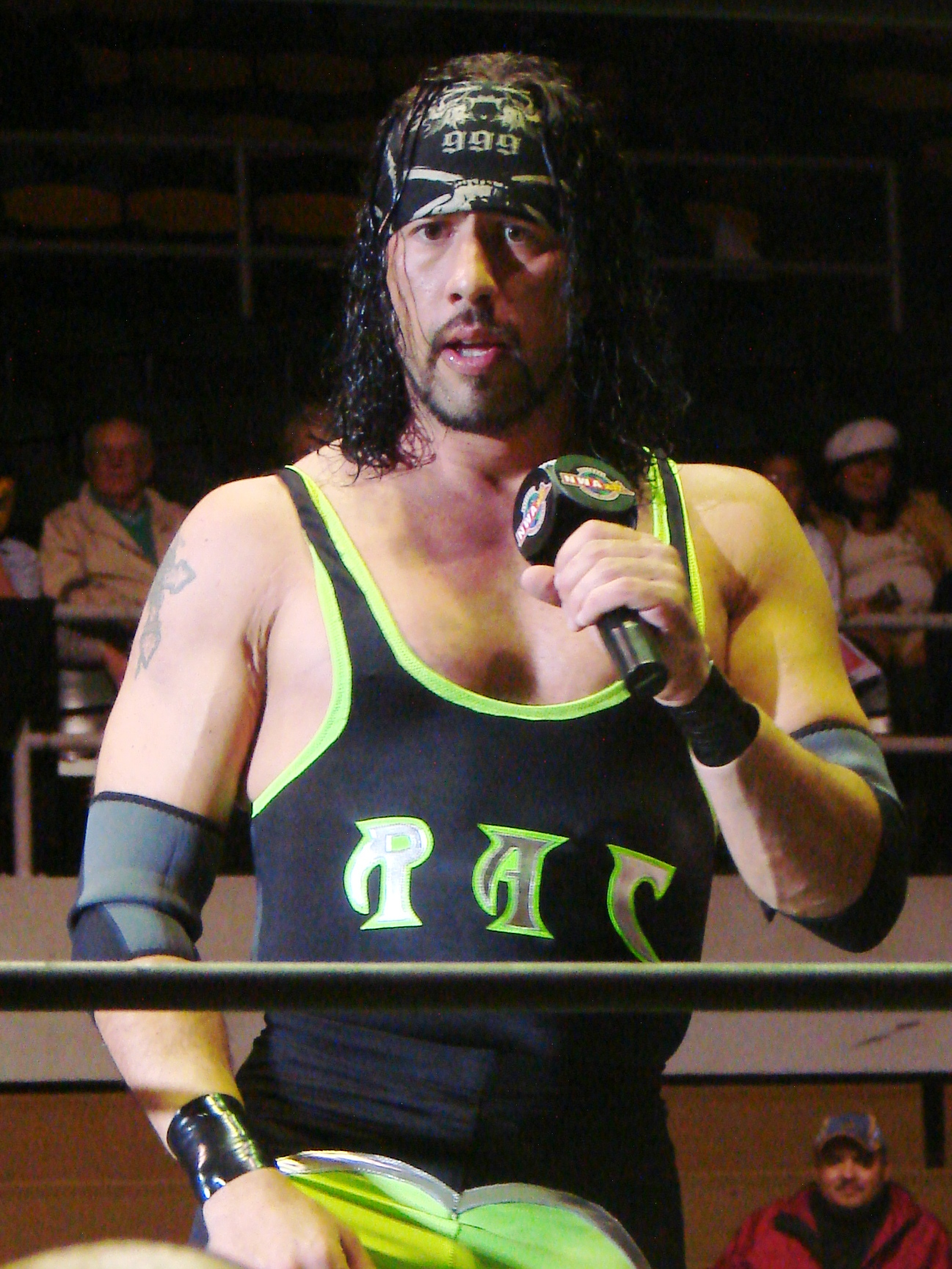
X-Pac suffered at the hands of myriad run-ins in his match

The Women's Championship match began with Tori taking her time to enter the ring, Sable grabbing her hair when she finally did and tossing her back out. Tori regrouped outside and pulled Sable out by her legs, ramming her face into the apron and the barricade. She was whipped into the barrier herself and as she recovered, Sable performed a crossbody from the outside apron. Sable continuously assaulted Tori while down on the mat. Tori clothesline the playboy cover girl. Tori punches Sable in the face 7 time. Sable was helpless and scream.Tori delivered two vicious clotheslines to the corner on Sable, then attempted a sunset flip pin which began a series of pinning reversals ending in a stalemate. Afterward Tori tried a running attack on Sable but took out referee Jimmy Korderas unwittingly. Sable then tried to perform her Sable Bomb but Tori jumped out of it. As she tried to perform her own powerbomb, a muscled woman, later identified as Nicole Bass, came into the ring to gorilla press slam Tori. This allowed Sable to Sable Bomb Tori and pin her to retain the championship.

Before X-Pac could make his way to the ring, Pat Patterson and Gerald Brisco attacked him from behind. This ambush backfired, however, as X-Pac easily overcame them before running into the ring, with Shane McMahon fleeing. Shane eventually made his way to the ring and was punched into the corner, escaping a Bronco Buster when Test pulled him out of the ring. Shane tried to escape once again, but X-Pac chased him and threw him back into the ring, only to be struck down by Test and then have his crotch rammed into the ring post. When he returned to the ring, Shane scoop slammed him and attempted a Corporate Elbow, with X-Pac sitting up just before the end, but he was brought back down with a low blow as referee Mike Chioda was distracted by Test. Shane continued to push the disqualification boundaries by whipping X-Pac with his belt several times before being back body dropped out of the ring, recovering only to be met with a flying crossbody. The Mean Street Posse tried to restrain X-Pac, but he fought back only to be floored by Test. After a superplex, the attempted pinfall was broken up by Test, causing referee Mike Chioda to eject him from ringside. X-Pac then whipped McMahon with the belt before roundhouse kicking him into the corner and performing the Bronco Buster. When Chioda checked on McMahon afterward, Test struck X-Pac with the championship belt, but by the time McMahon covered him he managed to kick out. Test tried to interfere once again, but took a Bronco Buster too. Triple H and Chyna then came to the ring to pull Test out. But as McMahon was floored by an X-Factor, Chyna distracted the referee to allow Triple H to Pedigree X-Pac and cover him with Shane, turning heel and allowing Shane to retain the title. The New Age Outlaws ran to the ring and brawled with Triple H and Test until the lights went out and Kane's music began to play. By the time the lights came up, The Corporation had fled the ring. Originally Mean Street Posse was supposed to face the rest of DX in a Greenwich Street fight with the match set in the Mean Streets of Greenwich but the match never aired.

=== Main event matches ===
The Hell in a Cell match began with Big Boss Man punching The Undertaker into the corner until he ducked out and returned the same. Although Boss Man was able to deliver a swinging neckbreaker, The Undertaker took control again throwing Boss Man into the cell. Boss Man reversed an Irish whip and threw The Undertaker into the cell too, handcuffing one hand to the chain fence. Boss Man taunted The Undertaker's lack of control before striking him repeatedly with his night stick causing The Undertaker to fall to the floor and rip the handcuffs, though Boss Man carried on using the nightstick and cut The Undertaker open. The Undertaker fought back by grabbing Boss Man at the throat and throwing him back into the fence again, striking him with a chair and running Boss Man face-first into the chain fence with a fireman's carry. As the two returned to the ring Boss Man tried to clothesline The Undertaker but he ducked and performed a leaping flying clothesline of his own before going Old School, ultimately falling into the ropes. The two began a fistfight in the middle of the ring with The Undertaker failing a tombstone piledriver attempt, but successfully performing it seconds later and pinned him afterward. The Undertaker stood up and looked to the heavens with his hands upwards, signaling The Brood to descend onto the roof of the cell. They cut open the roof of the cell and passed through a noose, securing the other end to the top of the cell. The Brood then ascended back into the rafters as The Undertaker put the noose around Boss Man's neck, with Paul Bearer causing the Cell to rise and take a hanging Boss Man with it. Over the years, this post-match segment has been seen as highly controversial, and has been subsequently edited off of various home video releases, as well as on Peacock and Netflix. After the match, a video package of the Rage Party was shown while Boss Man was taken down and carried off on a stretcher.

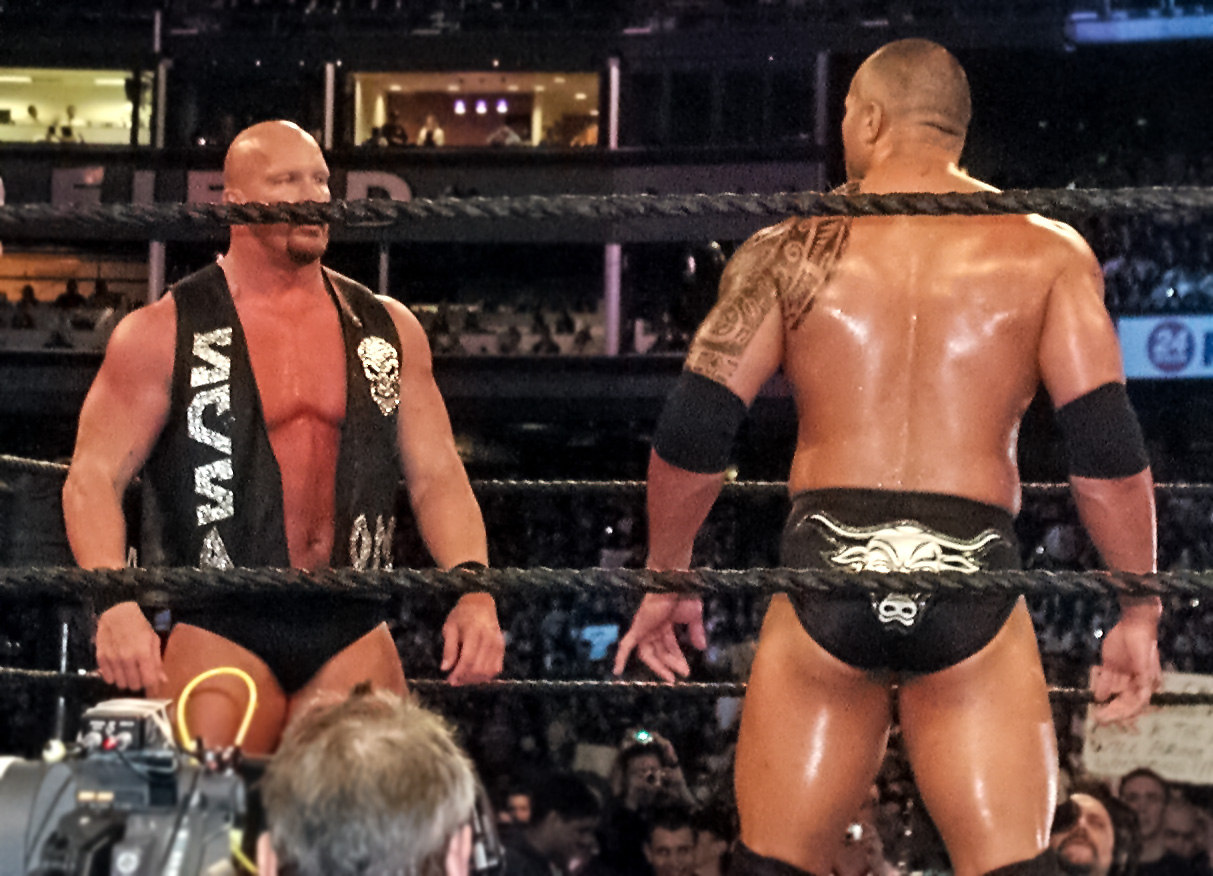
WrestleMania XV was the first of three WrestleMania encounters between "Stone Cold" Steve Austin and The Rock, with the two subsequently facing each other at WrestleMania X-Seven in 2001 and WrestleMania XIX in 2003.

Before the main event, Michael Cole announced Jim Ross returning to call the match. Mr. McMahon then came to the ring to declare himself as the special guest referee, but was instantly confronted by WWF Commissioner Shawn Michaels, who explained that only the commissioner is entitled to appoint a referee for WrestleMania, ordering McMahon to the back and barring all members of The Corporation from ringside. The main event began with the two wrestlers insulting each other before "Stone Cold" Steve Austin threw the first punch, with The Rock instantly returning. The majority of the early part of the match took place outside the ring, with Austin being choked with a T-shirt before the action spilled into the crowd. When The Rock threw Austin back into the ringside area, he choked him with some cable and took him up the entrance ramp, but Austin fought out of his grasp and threw him into the steel barriers, trying to piledrive him but being backbody dropped so that his knee landed onto light support girders. The Rock picked up Austin and threw him into the WrestleMania XV sign but Austin reversed and threw The Rock into the sign instead, before dragging him back towards the ring and having a suplex reversed on the concrete walkway. The Rock then tried to throw Austin back through the crowd at ringside, spitting water in his face, but Austin took control and put him onto the Spanish announce table, performing two elbow drops to break the table and then spat water into The Rock's face. Austin threw his opponent into the ring, celebrating to the crowd. But when he entered the ring, The Rock sprang up and nailed Austin with a Rock Bottom, following with an unsuccessful pinfall. This would mark the first time that any competitor had kicked out of the Rock Bottom. The Rock grabbed a chair, but Austin took it from him, The Rock blocked the oncoming chair shot by pulling referee Mike Chioda in front of him, who took the chair shot.

"Stone Cold" Steve Austin winning the WWF Championship

The Rock then caught Austin by surprise with a swinging neckbreaker, taking the chair and driving it into Austin's back several times. After another pin attempt, with Tim White now officiating, Austin still kicked out and The Rock used a sitting chin hold to subdue him. After holding him for some time, Austin slowly stood up, elbowing The Rock and attempting a running attack but was taken out with a Samoan drop, which Austin again kicked out of. The Rock took his frustration out on White, Rock Bottoming him, which gave Austin the time to recover and nail the champion with a Stone Cold Stunner, with Earl Hebner eventually coming in to officiate but only counting to two before The Rock kicked out. Mr. McMahon then came to the ring, distracting Austin while The Rock low-blowed him; the two men kicking away at Austin in the corner and punching Hebner when he tried to stop them. As the two double-teamed Austin, Mankind came running to the ring in his referee's uniform, throwing McMahon straight out the ring and taking over as referee. Austin tried a roll-up pin, following up with a Lou Thesz Press but The Rock soon took the advantage with another Rock Bottom. With Austin in the middle of the ring, The Rock tried the Corporate Elbow, but Austin moved out of the way at the last second. The Rock caught Austin's foot and spun him around, trying to Rock Bottom him again but Austin elbowed him away and delivered a Stunner, finally securing a pinfall and winning the WWF Championship.

== Reception ==
The event was met with mixed critical response. Canadian Online Explorer's professional wrestling section gave the entire event five out of 10 stars. The main event between The Rock and "Stone Cold" Steve Austin for the WWF Championship was rated eight out of 10 stars; the Hell in a Cell match between The Undertaker and Big Boss Man was rated five out of 10 stars; the match between Shane McMahon and X-Pac for the WWF European Championship was rated seven out of 10 stars; the match between Sable and Tori for the WWF Women's Championship was rated one out of 10 stars; the match between Triple H and Kane was rated four out of 10 stars; the referee match between Mankind and Big Show was rated four out of 10; the four-corners elimination match for the WWF Intercontinental Championship between Road Dogg Jesse James, Ken Shamrock, Goldust, and Val Venis was rated five out of 10 stars; the tag team match for the WWF Tag Team Championship between D'Lo Brown and Test against Owen Hart and Jeff Jarrett was rated three out of 10 stars; and the triple threat match for the WWF Hardcore Championship between Hardcore Holly, Billy Gunn, and Al Snow was rated six out of 10 stars.

Writing for 411Mania in 2009, Rob McNew gave the event a rating of 5.5/10, stating, "Like most Attitude Era shows this one doesn't hold up very well ten years later" though he praised the main event bout between Rock and Austin. Similarly, Scott Keith gave the event an overall negative rating, while calling the Rock vs. Austin match "solid by default" and complimenting Shane McMahon's performance given his lack of wrestling experience. In 2012, Bleacher Report ranked the event 25th out of the 27 WrestleManias to that point, calling the event "underwhelming" and criticizing the Hell in a Cell match.

== Aftermath ==
"Stone Cold" Steve Austin's feud with The Corporation continued after WrestleMania with Austin demanding the return of his customized smoking skull belt that was taken from him after losing the WWF Championship at Breakdown: In Your House in 1998. With The Ministry of Darkness continuing to threaten his family, Mr. McMahon was forced to comply with his nemesis' demands and ordered his son Shane to deliver the belt to Austin. Shane, however, refused and took matters with Austin into his own hands by giving the smoking skull belt to The Rock. This culminated in a rematch between Austin and The Rock at Backlash while Shane McMahon served as a special guest referee. Austin defeated The Rock to retain the WWF Championship after Mr. McMahon prevented Shane from screwing him and handed the smoking skull belt back to Austin.

The Ministry of Darkness continued their ongoing war with The Corporation, with The Undertaker going after Mr. McMahon's daughter Stephanie. Along the way, The Undertaker continued to make sacrifices including Ryan Shamrock, leading to a feud between The Undertaker and Ken Shamrock who wanted revenge for The Undertaker's actions to his family with The Undertaker defeating Shamrock at Backlash.

When The Undertaker did successfully find Stephanie, Shamrock, in his quest to get revenge on Undertaker, continued to beat down and interrogate members of The Ministry of Darkness for McMahon's whereabouts. After Christian told Shamrock Stephanie's whereabouts, The Undertaker punished Christian by whipping him and have him face crucifixion. Edge and Gangrel, who along with Christian were members of their own stable The Brood and were loyal to Christian, decided to rescue him, betraying The Ministry and turning face in the process. The Ministry got revenge by defeating The Brood in a Six-Man Tag Team Match at Backlash.

Bart Gunn would leave the WWF after his match against Butterbean. On the Dark Side of the Ring episode on the Brawl for All, Gunn said he felt his match against Butterbean was "punishment" for winning the Brawl and knocking out Steve "Dr. Death" Williams during the event (Williams suffered other injuries during the match) which was not what the bookers wanted (they wanted Williams to win to give him a push against "Stone Cold" Steve Austin). Gunn would not return to WWE until 2007.

Nicole Bass continued to accompany Sable to the ring and subsequently destroyed all competition for Sable's WWF Women's Championship. After Triple H washed his hands of D-Generation X and joined Chyna in the Corporation, X-Pac teamed up with Kane to form an unlikely tag team, and the duo captured the WWF Tag Team titles from Owen Hart and Jeff Jarrett.

The City of Philadelphia would later host the event again in 2024 with this time being held at the nearby Lincoln Financial Field in commemoration of the 25th anniversary of the event held in the city and the 40th anniversary of WrestleMania.

== Results ==
No.	Results	Stipulations	Times
1^{H}	Jacqueline (with Terri Runnels) defeated Ivory (with D'Lo Brown) by pinfall	Singles match	1:23
2^{H}	D'Lo Brown and Test won when Droz and The Godfather eliminated each other (Note: The other participants were: Rocco Rock, Johnny Grunge, Viscera, Gillberg, Animal, 8-Ball, Skull, Hawk, Scott Taylor, Faarooq, Tiger Ali Singh, Matt Hardy, Jeff Hardy, Mideon, Brian Christopher, Steve Blackman, and Bradshaw.)	Battle Royal to determine #1 contenders to the WWF Tag Team Championship	4:14
3	Hardcore Holly defeated Billy Gunn (c) and Al Snow by pinfall	Triple threat Hardcore match for the WWF Hardcore Championship	7:06
4	Owen Hart and Jeff Jarrett (c) (with Debra) defeated D'Lo Brown and Test (with Ivory) by pinfall	Tag team match for the WWF Tag Team Championship	3:58
5	Butterbean defeated Bart Gunn by knockout	Brawl for All match Vinny Pazienza served as the special guest referee while Kevin Roony, Chuck Wepner, and Gorilla Monsoon served as the judges.	0:35 (the match ended in round 1)
6	Mankind defeated Big Show by disqualification	Singles match The winner would be the special guest referee in the main event.	6:50
7	Road Dogg (c) defeated Goldust (with The Blue Meanie and Ryan Shamrock), Ken Shamrock, and Val Venis	Four corners elimination match for the WWF Intercontinental Championship	9:47
8	Kane (with Chyna) defeated Triple H by disqualification	Singles match	11:33
9	Sable (c) defeated Tori by pinfall	Singles match for the WWF Women's Championship	5:06
10	Shane McMahon (c) (with Test) defeated X-Pac by pinfall	Singles match for the WWF European Championship	8:41
11	The Undertaker (with Paul Bearer) defeated Big Boss Man by pinfall	Hell in a Cell match	9:46
12	"Stone Cold" Steve Austin defeated The Rock (c) by pinfall	No Disqualification match for the WWF Championship; The Corporation were banned from ringside. Mankind was the special guest referee.	16:52
(c) / – the champion(s) heading into the match; H / – the match was broadcast prior to the pay-per-view on Sunday Night Heat
