= Droz (wrestler) =

American professional wrestler and football player (1969–2023)

- Born: Darren Alexander Drozdov; April 7, 1969; Mays Landing, New Jersey, U.S.
- Died: June 30, 2023 (aged 54); Pomona, New Jersey, U.S.
- Education: University of Maryland
- Spouse: Julie Youngberg (m. 1999; div. 2005)
- Professional wrestling career
- Ring name(s): Darren Drozdov; Droz; Puke
- Billed height: 6 ft 4 in (1.93 m)
- Billed weight: 270 lb (122 kg)
- Trained by: Tom Prichard
- Debut: November 1997
- Retired: October 5, 1999
- Football career

No. 97
- Position: Defensive tackle

Personal information
- Listed height: 6 ft 3 in (1.91 m)
- Listed weight: 281 lb (127 kg)

Career information
- High school: Oakcrest High School (Mays Landing, New Jersey)
- College: Maryland
- NFL draft: 1993: undrafted

Career history
- New York Jets (1993)*; Denver Broncos (1993–1994); Montreal Alouettes (1996)
- * Offseason or practice squad member only
- Stats at Pro Football Reference

Darren Alexander Drozdov (April 7, 1969 – June 30, 2023), known professionally as Droz, was an American professional wrestler and football player. After a short career in the National Football League (NFL) and the Canadian Football League (CFL), he went into professional wrestling. He was best known for his time in the World Wrestling Federation (WWF), where he wrestled from 1998 to 1999 when a spinal cord injury ended his in-ring career, but remained employed with the company as a writer and columnist until his death in 2023.

== Early life ==
Drozdov was born in the Mays Landing section of Hamilton Township, Atlantic County, New Jersey. Drozdov, as a 6 ft 3 in (1.91 m), 245 lb (111 kg) quarterback in high school, threw a 72-yard touchdown pass to wide receiver Lou Rothman to win the last game of the 1985 regular season to finish the season with a perfect 10–0 record. Drozdov set an Atlantic County, New Jersey record in track and field in the shot put event. He was All-State in football at Oakcrest High School in South Jersey.

== Football career ==
After a stint at Fork Union Military Academy, Drozdov attended the University of Maryland and was a defensive tackle for the Terrapins. He culminated his collegiate career by graduating with a B.S. in criminal justice.

Before his wrestling career, Drozdov was a professional American football player for three seasons with the National Football League (NFL)'s New York Jets, Philadelphia Eagles and Denver Broncos. He garnered a measure of notoriety (and the nickname "Puke") when he vomited on television during a Monday Night Football game directly onto the football before the center could snap it. A 1993 Sports Illustrated article stated that he had vomited at nearly every game that season and would reportedly see a psychiatrist for a "chronic vomiting" problem.

== Professional wrestling career ==
=== Extreme Championship Wrestling (1997–1998) ===
Drozdov appeared with Extreme Championship Wrestling (ECW) from 1997 to 1998, where he formed a stable of "invaders" from the WWF with Lance Wright, Brakkus, Doug Furnas and Phil LaFon. From 1998 to 1999, he also worked in WWF developmental territories and the independent circuit in New Jersey.

=== World Wrestling Federation (1998–1999) ===
Drozdov made his World Wrestling Federation (WWF) debut in 1998. He claimed the natural ability to regurgitate on command, and WWF management decided to use this as his gimmick. In the documentary Beyond the Mat, his meeting with Vince McMahon is shown, with McMahon requesting Drozdov to vomit into a trashcan in his office.

Drozdov first wrestled in dark matches and on WWF Shotgun Saturday Night. He debuted on Raw is War on the May 25, 1998 episode (taped May 19) as an associate of the Legion of Doom. Dubbed Puke, he was the unofficial third member of the group. In late 1998, he competed in the WWF Brawl for All tournament, making it to the semifinals before losing to Bradshaw.

Droz was involved in a confrontation involving L.O.D. member Hawk's alcoholism. In this confrontation, Hawk was seen by his partner Animal as unfit to wrestle and Droz was tapped to take Hawk's place in the tag team. The situation ended with accusations that he had been the "enabler" of Hawk's problems and had dosed the L.O.D. member to take his place in the team. During this segment, Hawk was shown to have been pushed off the TitanTron by Droz.

The feud culminated at the UK pay-per-view WWF Capital Carnage when the L.O.D. team of Droz and Animal took on The Headbangers. During the match, Drozdov entered the ring to defend Animal who was on the receiving end of an illegal double-team by The Headbangers. While the referee was occupied ushering Thrasher out of the ring, Mosh rolled up Drozdov, and the referee turned around and made the three count. Animal, enraged that Puke got involved, began to brawl with him before walking away from the ring in disgust, effectively ending Drozdov's run with L.O.D.

After Drozdov's stint with the L.O.D., efforts were made to rebrand his persona, including one involving a series of skits called Droz's World, where he would tell stories about his life as a professional wrestler. He started to come into his own after turning heel. Drozdov started to build a stable of wrestlers who shared his bizarre lifestyle. He added Prince Albert to his faction as his personal "body piercing artist" and Key, alleged to be Droz's dealer. At Royal Rumble, Droz competed in the royal rumble match where he was eliminated by Mabel. On the Sunday Night Heat before WrestleMania XV, Droz competed in a Battle Royal to determine #1 contenders to the WWF Tag Team Championship making it to the final four before being eliminated. At SummerSlam, Droz and Prince Albert competed in a Tag team turmoil match to determine #1 contenders to the WWF Tag Team Championship which was won by The Acolytes (Faarooq and Bradshaw).

Pro Wrestling Illustrated ranked Drozdov #142 of the top 500 singles wrestlers in the PWI 500 in 1999.

==== Career-ending injury ====
Drozdov's active wrestling career ended prematurely when he suffered a severe neck injury during a match with D'Lo Brown during a WWF SmackDown! taping on October 5, 1999, at Nassau Coliseum on Long Island. Droz later stated that he was wearing a loose shirt during the match, a factor which contributed to the accident. When Brown attempted his signature running powerbomb, he was not able to gain a proper grip on Droz, and Droz was unable to execute a proper jump to aid in the lifting into the powerbomb position.

Drozdov landed on his head and suffered two fractured vertebrae in his neck. He was immediately admitted to the Nassau County Medical Center, where he underwent hours of surgery to reduce and stabilize the pressure on his injured neck. Because the match was pre-taped, it was not aired to the public during the October 7 broadcast and has never been shown to the public. However, the footage of him being taken out on a stretcher has been seen in WWE's "Don't Try This at Home" public service announcements.

Even with intensive medical care, his injury initially left him a quadriplegic with essentially no movement below the neck. Droz eventually regained movement in his upper body and arms. Drozdov repeatedly stated that the incident was an accident and that he held no animosity towards Brown for his injury, while Brown has said there is no blame on either side for the accident.

=== Post-injury ===
Droz continued to work for the WWE as a writer and columnist following his accident and wrote articles and essays for website and magazine content. He also became a recurring guest on the WWE Byte This! internet show, commenting on his opinions regarding talents or upcoming matches. For several years, he also wrote articles with his predictions for each WWE pay-per-view.

Drozdov made an appearance on the Life and Death of the Road Warriors DVD in 2005, discussing his run with the group in 1998. In September 2007, Droz was named honorary captain for a Maryland Terrapins football game against Villanova University. Drozdov was also interviewed for the Brawl for All and Last Ride of the Road Warriors episodes of Dark Side of the Ring in 2020.

== Personal life and death ==
Drozdov resided in South Jersey with his sister and her family. Drozdov required 24-hour in-home care and was required to take multiple medications daily in addition to needing to lie flat for long periods of time. With the assistance of his medical staff, and continued support from WWE, he was able to sustain a degree of independence.

Drozdov married WWE seamstress Julie Youngberg in 1999, days after his accident. He later stated that the one thing he would like to do would be to walk Julie down the aisle. The two divorced in late 2005.

Drozdov used a customized, tank-like wheelchair that was designed and financed by his college friend Under Armour founder Kevin Plank.

Drozdov died on June 30, 2023, at AtlantiCare Regional Medical Center in Pomona, New Jersey. He was 54.

== See also ==
- List of gridiron football players who became professional wrestlers
- List of premature professional wrestling deaths
