= WWF Brawl for All =

1998 shootfighting tournament held in the World Wrestling Federation

Brawl for All
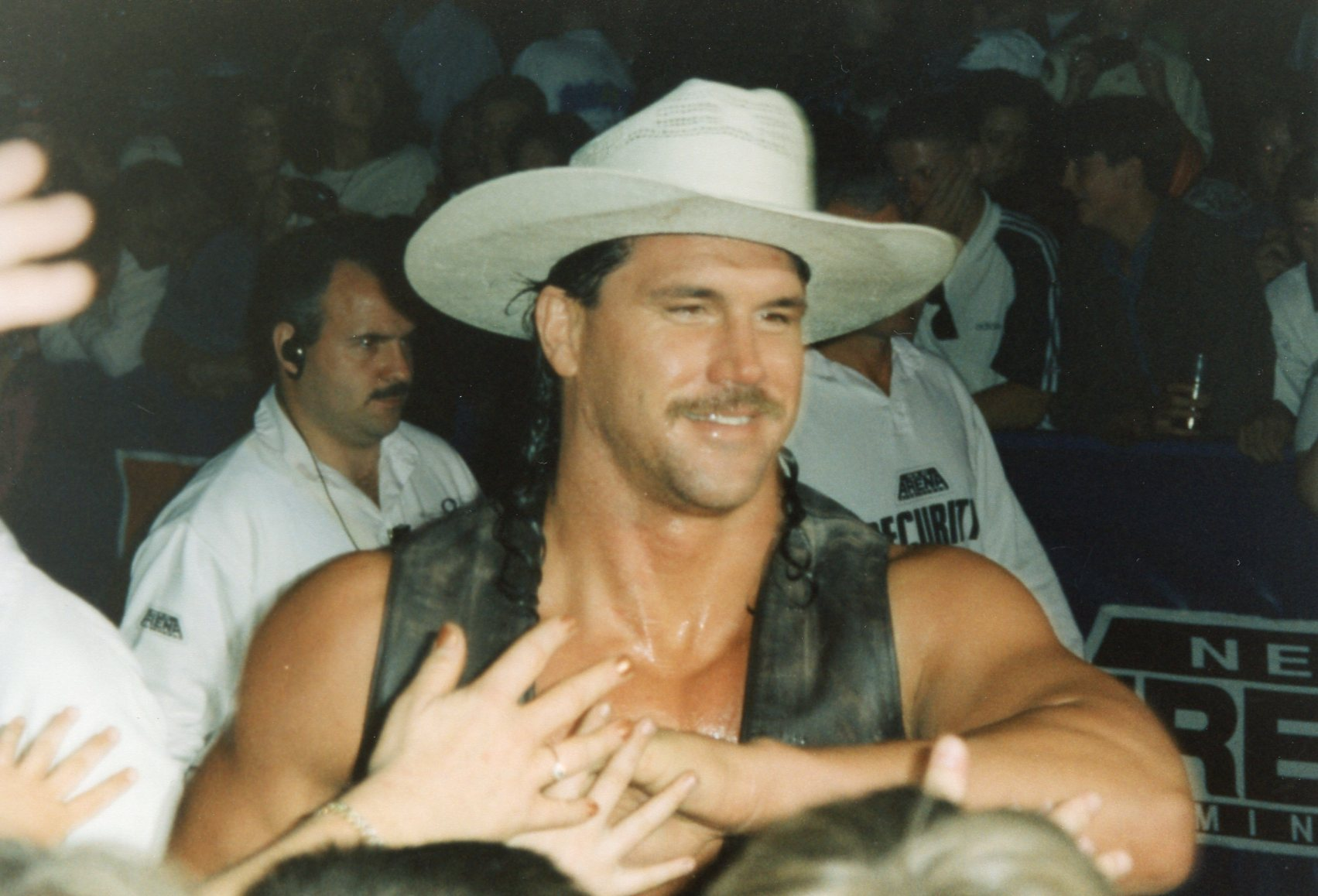
- Bart Gunn, winner of Brawl for All

Tournament information
- Sport: Professional wrestling; Shootfighting; Boxing
- Location: United States
- Dates: June 29, 1998–August 24, 1998
- Tournament format: Single-elimination tournament
- Participants: 16

Final positions
- Champion: Bart Gunn
- Runner-up: Bradshaw

Tournament statistics
- Matches played: 15

WWF Brawl for All was a shootfighting tournament held in the World Wrestling Federation (WWF, now WWE) lasting from June 29, 1998, to August 24, 1998. The Brawl for All was the creation of then-WWF writer Vince Russo. The promotion resulted in a number of legitimate injuries for WWF performers, was negatively received by fans, and has garnered harsh criticism of its conception and execution.

== Inception ==
Throughout 1998, the WWF experienced a growth in roster size, but due to limited amount of television time a number of their more genuine "tough guys" were left without much to do. As a result, the idea for a legitimate tough guy tournament was bandied about as a way to both utilize some of these men and capitalize on the recent interest in Toughman Contests around the country. According to John "Bradshaw" Layfield, Vince Russo came up with the idea when Layfield wanted to create a hardcore wrestling division in the WWF. Russo said he devised the tournament as a consequence of Bradshaw claiming he could beat anyone on the roster in a bar fight. Jim Cornette also reported that it was Russo's idea.

Participation in the tournament was strictly voluntary. Bruce Prichard stated on his podcast, Something to Wrestle with Bruce Prichard, that when he was presented with the idea, he thought it was "the stupidest, worst idea he had ever heard". He additionally asked Russo how the company would explain to fans and pundits how the professional wrestling performances of main-eventers such as The Undertaker and Stone Cold Steve Austin did were "bullshit", but the Brawl for All, stocked largely with mid-card level talents, was a real contest. He was later reprimanded for being so negative to the Brawl for All concept. "I've stated my case, I think it's a horrible idea, everyone knows how I feel about it, so I just kept my mouth shut about it."

== Tournament events and injuries ==
Each match consisted of three one-minute rounds. Whichever wrestler connected with the most punches per round scored 5 points. In addition, a clean takedown scored 5 points and a knockdown was worth 10. If a wrestler was knocked out (decided by an eight-count rather than a ten-count), the match ended. The matches were scored by ringside judges including Gorilla Monsoon. According to Jim Cornette, "Dr. Death" Steve Williams was the WWF's favorite to win the tournament, with the company looking towards a lucrative pay-per-view match between Williams and Stone Cold Steve Austin; Bob Holly claimed that Williams had already been paid the $100,000 prize money before his second round fight against Bart Gunn. During the third round of their fight, Gunn took Williams down, injuring Williams's hamstring, and knocked Williams out seconds later.

Gunn went on to defeat Bradshaw by KO on the August 24, 1998 episode of Raw is War to win the tournament and $75,000. Bradshaw received $25,000. The WWF roster at the time had two well-known former UFC fighters, Dan Severn and Ken Shamrock. Shamrock declined the opportunity to take part, while Severn defeated The Godfather in the first round, but then withdrew from the tournament, stating he had nothing to prove. In a radio interview, Severn asserted that the WWF at first had not allowed him or Shamrock to compete at all and that they removed Severn from the tournament after his first-round victory over The Godfather. However, Steve Williams recalls Shamrock "backing out" and Severn withdrawing because of his "frustration at the rules and the idea of having to wear boxing gloves". Along with Williams, a number of other wrestlers sustained legitimate injuries during the tournament. These included the Godfather, Steve Blackman, Road Warrior Hawk, Savio Vega, Droz, and Brakkus.

== Reception ==
Fans in attendance immediately voiced their disapproval of the tournament with chants of "Boring!" and "We want wrestling!" Josh Nason of the Wrestling Observer Newsletter wrote that Brawl for All was "regarded as a terrible idea". Then-WWF official Jim Cornette has described the tournament as "the stupidest thing that the WWF has ever done", at least on television. He argued that the WWF misjudged the appeal that legitimate fighting would have to their audience, considering that the WWF had promoted the idea that their matches were merely entertainment. Furthermore, because the fighters were trained to work professional wrestling matches and not to fight, they risked both injury and the possibility that a defeat would hurt their marketability. Cornette also criticized the WWF for failing to use the tournament to promote Bart Gunn as a new star wrestler.

In the WWE documentary The Attitude Era, Jim Ross stated that it was "one of those ideas that looked really cool on paper", but John "Bradshaw" Layfield added that the execution was "a bad idea". Layfield also stated that "nobody knew Bart Gunn was that good." Ross later remarked that "No one got over". Sean Waltman called it "the dumbest fucking idea in WWE history", and felt the company educated its audience that "These guys are fighting for real, and everything else you're watching is bullshit." Documentary series Dark Side of the Ring covered the tournament in the fourth episode of its second season. In comparison to the North American audience, the Brawl for All had better reception in Japan due to the rise of shootfighting and mixed martial arts, as it resulted in Bart Gunn's All Japan Pro Wrestling signing (Gunn became a successful mainstay for the company) and further advanced Steve Williams's character development on their shows.

== Aftermath ==
Immediately prior to the Brawl for All, Holly (as "Bombastic Bob") and Gunn (as "Bodacious Bart") had been performing as a new version of The Midnight Express with Jim Cornette as their manager and had won the NWA World Tag Team Championship after defeating The Headbangers on an episode of Raw. After winning the tournament, Bart Gunn, while still under contract with the WWF, was offered an All Japan Pro Wrestling contract from owner Giant Baba, who took interest in hiring Gunn due in part to his knockout of Steve Williams. In Japan, Williams was a longtime main-eventer and held a strong reputation for his toughness, and Giant Baba sought to integrate the Brawl for All results into his storylines. After signing with All Japan in October 1998, Gunn's debut would be announced on the November 1, 1998 edition of AJPW TV, making his in-ring debut that month.

In February 1999, Gunn would return to the WWF to fulfill his contract obligations. Gunn feuded with both Bob Holly, now known as Hardcore Holly, and Steve Williams, both angry at having been beaten in the tournament, the latter masking himself and pushing Gunn off a stage. Gunn was later matched against professional boxer Butterbean at WrestleMania XV in a boxing match; Gunn was knocked out 35 seconds into the bout and was fired by the WWF afterward. Jim Cornette was critical of Gunn being placed in a match with a pro boxer. Bob Holly and a number of others have long claimed that Butterbean was brought in to defeat Gunn as punishment for defeating the company's desired winner, Steve Williams. This was actually confirmed by Butterbean himself in a 2023 interview.

After the loss to Butterbean, Gunn returned to All Japan in May 1999, changing his ring name to Mike Barton that summer. Gunn returned to the since-renamed WWE for tryout dark matches in 2003 and for Raw 15th Anniversary Battle Royal in 2007. After the tournament, Droz suffered career-ending paralysis unrelated to the tournament during a SmackDown! taping in 1999. Steve Blackman left in 2002, while Bob Holly stayed with the company until 2009. Future WWE Hall of Fame inductees The Godfather and Bradshaw left in 2002 and 2009 respectively.

=== Mike Barton vs. Steve Williams ===
In January 2000, "Dr. Death" Steve Williams returned to All Japan Pro Wrestling (AJPW), where Bart Gunn was wrestling under the name Mike Barton as a full-time competitor during Williams's absence. On the live edition of the January 17, 2000 episode of AJPW TV, Williams defeated Barton in a 12-minute singles match, with two minutes of this match featured on a syndicated recap episode of AJPW. The feud would continue for a week in the house show circuit before being postponed. The storyline would resume in the summer of 2000 at a time when Barton was teaming with Giant Kimala and George Hines. Barton and Williams would each win against each other on various TV episodes and house shows in 50/50 booking. In the late summer and fall of 2000, Barton and Williams found themselves in an uneasy alliance where they both had a common enemy in Toshiaki Kawada, who was often defeating both Barton and Williams at the time on TV, as well as a common enemy with Genichiro Tenryu. Barton would ultimately defeat Kawada in tag-team action, but come short against Tenryu in the first round of the Triple Crown Tournament.

In December 2000, the storyline animosity between Barton and Williams resumed, where Williams crossed paths with Barton in a tag-team television match during the World's Strongest Tag Determination League 2000 tournament. They were on opposite teams and Williams sought to get even with Barton for his loss in the Brawl For All in a definitive match in the Tokyo Dome. The feud with Williams would culminate into a revenge match on a January 28, 2001 for the Giant Baba Memorial Spectacular pay-per-view, which Williams won. The match itself was the third-to-last match on the card, but on the initial broadcast and on AJPW TV was promoted and portrayed as a main event to the viewer. After this, Barton and Williams would regularly wrestle against each other throughout the first half of 2001, before the two would eventually team with each other later that year in October. Jim Steele and Mike Rotunda would join them in three-way or four-way tag team matches whenever the need arose.

By late 2001, Williams would be a friend of Bart Gunn, often being by his side and taking part in both backstage and in-ring skits, as well as Williams rooting for Barton in his matches. Most notably, in January 2002 the pair celebrated Abdullah the Butcher's birthday together in the ring singing and telling jokes, as well as Williams cheering Barton on when he was facing Genichiro Tenryu in the Champion Carnival 2002 tournament. Barton ultimately defeated Tenryu, bragging backstage to the camera about his win, where Williams was happy for Barton and they fist pumped each other shouting in excitement.

== Brawl for All tournament bracket ==
Color key

Wrestler won via knockout
Wrestler won via point victory

1st Round; Raw Is War; June 29 – July 14, 1998
Marc Mero	—
Steve Blackman	Victory
Mark Canterbury	—
Bradshaw	Victory
Brakus	—
Savio Vega	Victory
Darren Drozdov	Draw
Road Warrior Hawk	Draw
Bart Gunn	Victory
Bob Holly	—
Quebecer Pierre	—
Steve Williams	Knockout
The Godfather	—
Dan Severn	Victory
8-Ball	—
Scorpio	Victory

Quarterfinals; Raw Is War; July 27 – August 10, 1998
Marc Mero (Note: Steve Blackman was forced to withdraw from the tournament due to an injury sustained in training. Marc Mero advanced to the next round.)	—
Bradshaw	Victory
Savio Vega	—
Darren Drozdov (Note: Darren "Droz" Drozdov advanced after Road Warrior Hawk suffered an injury during the bout.)	Victory
Bart Gunn	Knockout
Steve Williams	—
The Godfather (Note: Dan Severn won the bout, but he withdrew, saying he had nothing to prove. The Godfather advanced to the quarterfinals.)	Victory
Scorpio	—

Semifinals; Raw Is War; August 11, 1998 (Aired: August 17)
Bradshaw	Victory
Darren Drozdov	—
Bart Gunn	Knockout
The Godfather	—

Final; Raw Is War; August 24, 1998
Bradshaw	—
Bart Gunn	Knockout
