= The Brood (professional wrestling) =

Professional wrestling stable

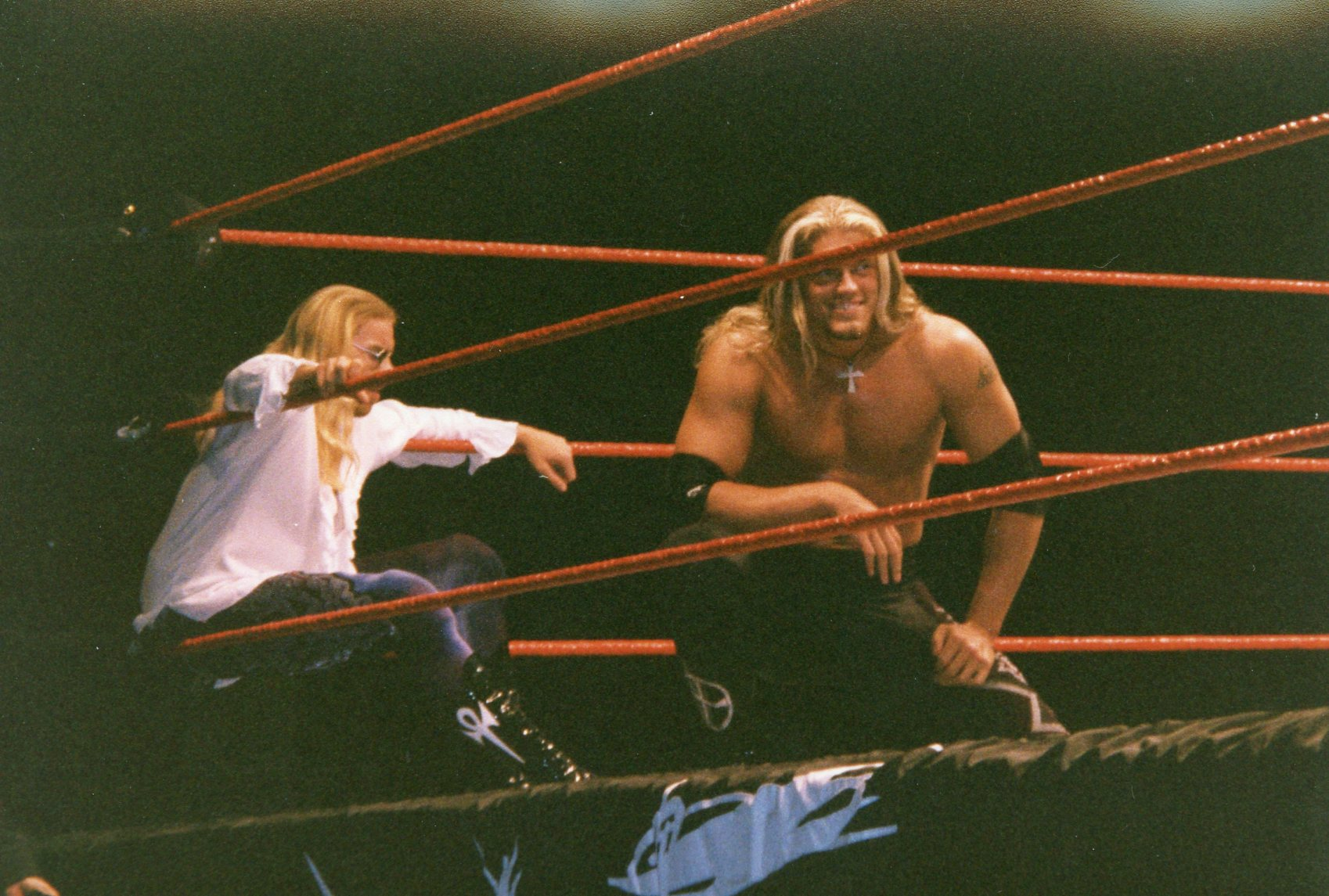
- Edge & Christian, members of The Brood

Stable
- Members: Gangrel (leader); Christian; Edge; Matt Hardy; Jeff Hardy
- Combined billed weight: 693 lb (314 kg)
- Debut: October 26, 1998
- Disbanded: October 18, 1999
- Years active: 1998–1999

The Brood was a villainous professional wrestling stable known for its time in the World Wrestling Federation (WWF, now WWE) during the Attitude Era from 1998 to 1999. The Brood was composed of leader Gangrel, Christian, Edge, and later on, Matt and Jeff, the Hardy Boyz. Their gimmick was that of a clan of vampires, although they were often merely described by announcers as living a "gothic lifestyle".

== History ==
=== Formation ===
All three of the original Brood members debuted in 1998. Edge made his debut in the WWF on the June 22 episode of Raw Is War as a loner who entered the ring through the crowd. Gangrel, known previously as the Vampire Warrior, made his WWF debut on the August 16 episode of Sunday Night Heat. He was given a new vampire gimmick based on the White Wolf roleplaying game Vampire: The Masquerade. Christian debuted on September 27 at In Your House: Breakdown 1998 where he distracted Edge, who subsequently lost his match to Owen Hart. The storyline introduced Christian as Edge's (kayfabe) brother. In reality, the two had been best friends since childhood.

Christian continued at the side of Gangrel to help him in his feud with Edge, and he won the WWF Light Heavyweight Championship in his first match in the WWF. Eventually, the duo convinced Edge to join them, forming the stable known as The Brood. On the October 26 episode of Raw during a match between Kane and Gangrel, it ended when Edge ran in and attacked Kane and called Christian and Gangrel together. In their first match as a group they defeated The Oddities on the November 1 episode of Heat. On the November 2 edition of Raw, The Brood faced Degeneration X (New Age Outlaws & X Pac) which ended in a No Contest. On the November 9 episode of Raw, Edge lost to Kane by disqualification when Kane attempted to set The Brood on fire. At Rock Bottom: In Your House, The Brood defeated J.O.B. Squad (Al Snow, Scorpio, and Bob Holly) in a six man tag team match.

=== Ministry of Darkness ===
In February 1999, The Brood feuded with The Undertaker's Ministry of Darkness stable. The end of the feud saw The Brood merge with The Ministry. In March, after Undertaker's Hell in a Cell match with the Big Boss Man at WrestleMania XV, Edge, Christian, and Gangrel were lowered onto the cage from the ceiling. They lowered a noose into the cell, and the Undertaker proceeded to hang The Big Boss Man from the top of the cage. The Brood were often victims of beatings at the hands of the Ministry to both prove their loyalty to the Undertaker and to punish them. On one occasion, Christian was sentenced to a flogging at the hands of his fellow Brood members, and from the Undertaker himself after he was forced to reveal to Ken Shamrock the location of Stephanie McMahon when Shamrock held Christian in an ankle lock. When it came to the point Undertaker tried to force the Brood to sacrifice Christian alongside Shamrock, Edge and Gangrel refused, as they were more loyal to Christian than the Ministry. Instead attacking the Acolytes, the Brood split from the Undertaker's loyalty, thus becoming the only members of the Ministry to defect from the stable before the Corporate Ministry merger. This led to a feud with the Ministry of Darkness, specifically The Acolytes at Backlash: In Your House, The Acolytes and Mideon defeated The Brood in a six man tag team match. on the April 26 episode of Raw, The Brood (Gangrel & Edge) lost to Kane and X-Pac and afterwards Kane got a bloodbath.

=== Feud with Hardy Boyz and split ===
On the May 17 episode of Raw, The Brood took on Hardy Boyz and Michael Hayes with all battling outside of the ring and the match getting thrown out, sparking the beginning of the rivalry between Edge and Christian and The Hardy Boyz. On the May 24 episode of Raw, Edge and Gangrel lost a WWF Tag Team Championship match to Kane and X-Pac. On the June 13 episode of Sunday Night Heat, The Brood defeated The Hardy Boyz & Michael Hayes in a six-man tag team elimination match. On the July 11 episode of Sunday Night Heat, The Brood lost to The Corporate Ministry (Big Boss Man, Mideon and Viscera) when Gangrel turned on Edge. Gangrel subsequently tried to convince Christian to do the same, but Edge and Christian instead split from Gangrel, who in turn aligned himself with Matt and Jeff Hardy.

=== The New Brood ===
The New Brood was formed after the Hardy Boyz dumped Michael Hayes as their manager in August 1999, turned heel, briefly becoming associated with Gangrel. After winning a series of matches against the team of Edge and Christian, dubbed the "Terri Invitational Tournament", they won the services of Terri Runnels as their manager by winning the first ever tag team ladder match at No Mercy by defeating Edge and Christian. The fans gave both teams a standing ovation the next night on Raw Is War. On that same night, The Hardy Boyz announced that they were not the New Brood – they were The Hardy Boyz. They called a truce with Edge and Christian, and the quartet attacked Gangrel after he bragged that he got to use the "services" of Terri while Matt and Jeff were recovering from last night. Gangrel ended his association with both teams. The Hardys would continue to use the darker and more gothic-oriented appearance they utilized when allied with Gangrel throughout both their tag team and successive solo runs.

=== Reunions (2022, 2024) ===
On the May 27, 2022 episode of AEW Rampage, during a feud with The Hardys, Gangrel appeared with The Young Bucks during a tag team match with Jon Cruz and Taylor Rust. Following the match, Gangrel was attacked by The Young Bucks until The Hardys appeared.

In WWE, Edge once again presented his solo variation of The Brood's gimmick to fight against Finn Bálor inside Hell in a Cell at WrestleMania 39. According to Edge, he pushed for a reunion with Gangrel during the match; however, WWE declined the idea, stating that "nobody remembers (him)". They would reunite on May 26, 2024, at the Double or Nothing pay-per-view, where Edge (working under his real name Adam Copeland) wrestled Malakai Black in a barbed wire steel cage match. Copeland entered with 'The Brood' logo on the titantron, and during the match Gangrel entered through the canvas to assist Copeland, offsetting interference from The House of Black.

== Gimmick ==
The Brood entered arenas by rising through a ring of fire onto the (elevated) stage floor, with Gangrel carrying a chalice of "blood". Usually, Gangrel took a drink from the chalice (and sometimes he would pass it to Edge or Christian to drink from) and then spit it towards the crowd. One of the group's trademarks was giving their opponents a "blood bath", before or after a wrestling match. A "blood bath" consisted of the lights in the arena turning off, the flashing red lights of Gangrel's entrance coming on, and then the arena lights turning on again to reveal the target bathed in "blood". The trio had similar looking long blond hair. Gangrel and Christian both wore white shirts and dark pants, while Edge wore the long leather coat he wore before joining The Brood. According to Edge, he was uncomfortable with his prior gimmick, saying he lacked the confidence at the time to be a singles star, and welcomed his inclusion into The Brood.

== Legacy ==
On the October 30, 2018 episode of SmackDown Live, The New Day dressed up as The Brood during its Halloween episode during Big E's Trick or Street Fight against Cesaro.

During Edge's 2021 rivalry with Seth Rollins on SmackDown building up to SummerSlam, the latter suggested Edge would not prevail because he was unable to tap into the darkness with which he once surrounded himself. This prompted Edge to unleash his inner "Brood" persona, thus giving Rollins a bloodbath during the August 20, 2021 episode of SmackDown, and at that year's SummerSlam he would make this entrance to the Brood's music, including emerging from a ring of fire on the stage. Edge then defeated Rollins at the event, On the December 27, 2021 episode of Raw during a segment wherein The Miz and Maryse renewed their vows, they were also given a bloodbath from The Brood upon the interruption from Edge. Following his expulsion from The Judgment Day stable, in which Edge was a member of the Ministry of Darkness for one night, in June 2022, Edge returned in his Brood gimmick assisting the Mysterios (composed of Rey and Dominik Mysterio) in the following month's SummerSlam event.

== Championships and accomplishments ==
- Pro Wrestling Illustrated
  - PWI ranked Jeff Hardy #76 of the 500 best wrestlers in 1999
  - PWI ranked Edge #83 of the 500 best wrestlers in 1999
  - PWI ranked Christian #90 of the 500 best wrestlers in 1999
  - PWI ranked Matt Hardy #100 of the 500 best wrestlers in 1999
  - PWI ranked Gangrel #102 of the 500 best wrestlers in 1999
- World Wrestling Federation
  - WWF Light Heavyweight Championship (1 time) – Christian
