= Steve Blackman =

American professional wrestler (born 1963)

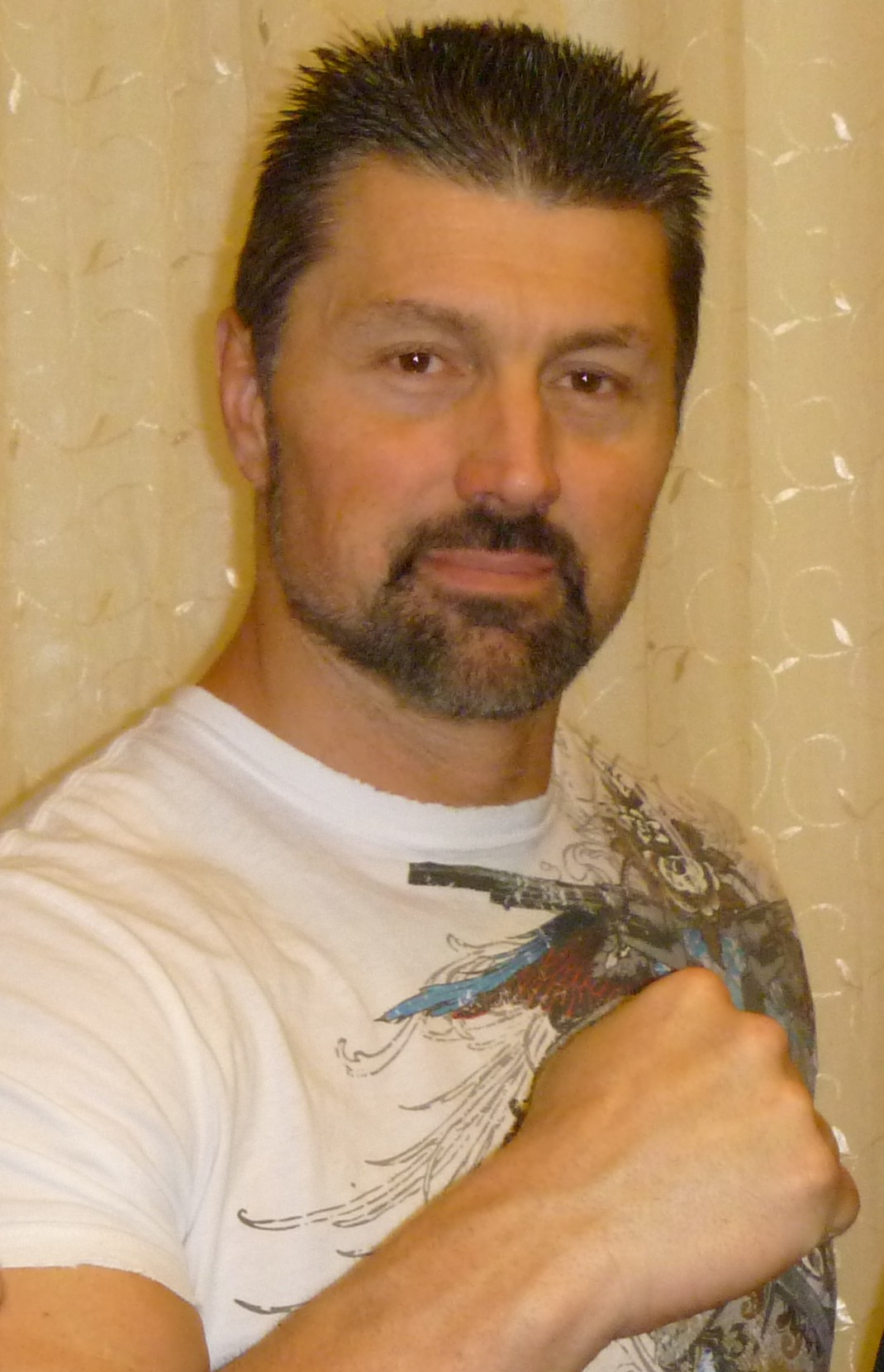
- Blackman in 2011

Personal information
- Born: September 28, 1963 (age 63) Annville, Pennsylvania, U.S.
- Children: 2

Professional wrestling career
- Ring name(s): Steve Blackman; Steve R. Blackman
- Billed height: 6 ft 2 in (188 cm)
- Billed weight: 245 lb (111 kg)
- Billed from: Annville, Pennsylvania, U.S.
- Trained by: Tony Altomare
- Debut: 1986
- Retired: December 10, 2007

Steve Blackman (born September 28, 1963) is an American martial arts instructor and former professional wrestler. He is best known for his appearances with the World Wrestling Federation (WWF, now WWE) from 1997 to 2002, where he was a frequent challenger for the promotion's mid-card titles. He held the WWF Hardcore Championship six times and holds the record for most combined days as champion, a total of 172 days.

== Professional wrestling career ==
=== Early career (1986–1989) ===
Steve Blackman began as a competitive bodybuilder and weightlifter before entering professional wrestling in 1986 in Connecticut, training at Tony Altamore's wrestling school and working for Stu Hart's Stampede Wrestling in Calgary until early 1989. Also around that time, in January 1988, Blackman once toured with New Japan Pro-Wrestling wrestling as Steve R. Blackman during their New Year Golden Series. He wrestled singles matches against the likes of Tatsumi Fujinami, Riki Choshu, Hiroshi Hase, Nobuhiko Takada, Kengo Kimura, and a few others. He also wrestled tag team matches in that tour teaming with the likes of Tony St. Clair, Buzz Sawyer, "Dr. Death" Steve Williams and Johnny K-9.

Blackman made his first appearance for the World Wrestling Federation (WWF) on March 9, 1988, at a house show in Watertown, New York. Wrestling David Sammartino, Blackman gained a victory in his first match. He then appeared on the May 8, 1988, episode of WWF Superstars where he teamed with Outback Jack and Brady Boone against The Islanders and Sivi Afi. Blackman appeared again on a WWF house show in Auburn Hills, Michigan on June 24, 1989, when he defeated Iron Mike Sharpe. He was supposed to wrestle Boris Zukhov on a Watertown, New York house show on September 2, 1989 but was replaced.

Blackman was being considered for a full-time contract with the WWF when he contracted malaria and dysentery while wrestling in South Africa in 1989 and was essentially bedridden for two years. After his rest, during which he lost much of his muscle mass, Blackman spent another four years in physical therapy to recover his condition, and incorporated martial arts training, specifically escrima and tae kwon do. Once back in working shape, he contacted his friends Brian Pillman and Owen Hart for a new WWF try-out. Blackman also reached out to Jim Cornette who brought him in for a tryout and presented Blackman to Vince McMahon.

=== World Wrestling Federation / World Wrestling Entertainment (1997–2002) ===
==== Early storylines (1997–2000) ====
Blackman made his second WWF debut on the November 3, 1997, episode of Raw is War when he jumped the guardrail, to help Vader fend off an attack from The Hart Foundation. Blackman was given a martial arts gimmick, and named "The Lethal Weapon" Steve Blackman. His first pay-per view appearance was at Survivor Series 1997, as a replacement for the injured Patriot as the fourth member of Team USA (Vader, Goldust, and Marc Mero). Blackman was the first elimination of the match when he was counted out of the ring. Team USA lost to Team Canada (British Bulldog, Jim "The Anvil" Neidhart, Phillip Lafon, and Doug Furnas) when the British Bulldog pinned Vader. His next pay-per view appearance was at Royal Rumble 1998 in the 30-man Royal Rumble match. He was the tenth entrant into the Rumble, but was eliminated by Kurrgan. Blackman was undefeated for close to a year after his debut, during this time Blackman established his trademark entrance involving swinging glow-in-the-dark escrima sticks. His first loss finally came at the hands of Jeff Jarrett thanks to interference from Jarrett's manager, at the time, Tennessee Lee.

In early-1998, Blackman started feuding with the Nation of Domination and achieved great success by defeating the likes of The Rock and Faarooq. In his attempts to combat the Nation of Domination he teamed up with Ken Shamrock. Blackman and Shamrock teamed with former Nation member Faarooq at Unforgiven: In Your House to defeat The Rock, D-Lo Brown and Mark Henry. Eventually, Blackman and Shamrock split to pursue singles success, both men entered the King of the Ring in 1998 but would never get to face each other because Blackman lost to Marc Mero, Shamrock won the tournament. During this time he would develop a reputation for doing run-ins during matches where one of the participants would cheat by having a run-in done in his favor, thus earning him the nickname "The Peacemaker" from the announce team. Blackman competed in the WWF Brawl for All tournament and once again came up against Marc Mero, this time however Blackman defeated him but would have to withdraw due to injury, allowing Mero to advance by default.

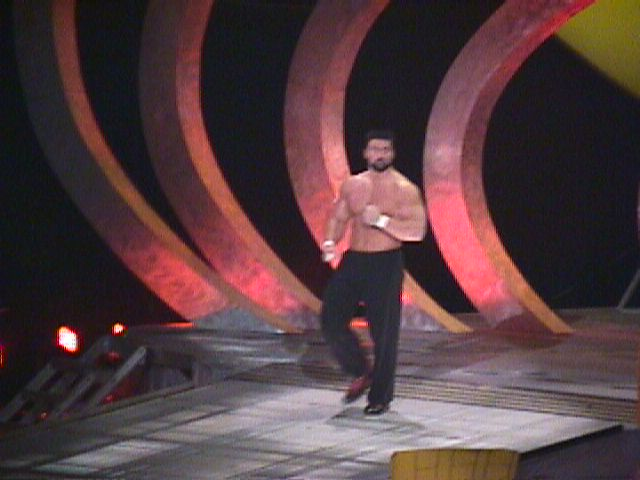
Blackman making his way to the ring at a SmackDown event in 1999

On the August 17, 1998 episode of Raw, Blackman came to the aid of Shamrock when he was being beat down by Owen Hart and Dan Severn. For his efforts Shamrock suplexed Blackman and in retaliation Blackman suplexed Shamrock back. This would lead to Blackman and Shamrock facing each other in the first round of the WWF Intercontinental Championship tournament which was won by Shamrock. At WWF Capital Carnage, Blackman took on Shamrock for the WWF Intercontinental Championship and lost. Blackman would eventually turn heel after siding with then-heel Shane McMahon. During his run as a heel, he brought a gym bag full of martial arts weapons with him to the ring, including kendo shinai. Blackman would attempt to use the weapons in the bag during or after the match. After a short hiatus, Blackman returned as the hired hitman of Vince McMahon to take out Ken Shamrock and cost Shamrock the King of the Ring in 1999. This led to an iron circle match at Fully Loaded 1999 and a lion's den match at SummerSlam 1999, both of which Shamrock won.

On the Smackdown after SummerSlam, Blackman interfered in Shamrock's match against Val Venis and afterwards Shamrock knocked Blackman out. Once Blackman regained consciousness, he destroyed Venis with his signature Nunchucks. Blackman was set to face Venis and D-Lo Brown with Mark Henry, however, Henry failed to show making it a handicap match. Annoyed by Henry, he challenged him for the WWF European Championship and during the match Val Venis would attack Blackman with a kendo stick, costing him the match. During a match on SmackDown while Blackman was in the ring, Venis came to the ring switched Blackman's weapon bag with an identical bag. When Blackman went into what he thought was his bag for a weapon, he instead pulled out a sex toy. Their feud culminated in a match at Unforgiven 1999 where Venis defeated Blackman.

At Survivor Series in November 1999, Blackman teamed with Gangrel, Mark Henry, and Val Venis to defeat British Bulldog and the Mean Street Posse in a Survivor Series match. Later that month, he formed a short-lived tag team with Kurt Angle. After Blackman and Angle lost a tag team match to the Dudley Boyz, Angle attached Blackman, leading to a bout at Armageddon in December 1999 where Angle defeated Blackman.

In January 2000, Blackman and Al Snow then formed a tag team that was known unofficially as Head Cheese, as Snow made Blackman wear a cheesehead hat to complement the mannequin head that Snow carried to the ring, turning face. Blackman had a reputation for being very serious and not displaying emotion, so the two put on comedy duo skits with Blackman as the straight man. Many of the skits involved Snow's attempts to come up with a gimmick for their team. In one backstage scene, Snow proposed that the duo develop a TV show wherein they travel through time and solve mysteries. In that same skit Snow proposed Blackman dress up like Dracula as he already "Had the personality of a dead guy". Another memorable sketch involved Snow scheduling an unsuspecting Blackman to perform stand-up comedy at a nursing home, with humorously disastrous results. Head Cheese had one opportunity to become the WWF World Tag Team Champions when they took on the New Age Outlaws, however, the match ended in a no contest due to the interference from the debuting Radicalz. Head Cheese also appeared on WrestleMania 2000 losing to T & A (Test and Albert).

==== Hardcore Champion (2000) ====
After the Head Cheese team went their separate ways, Blackman entered competition for the WWF Hardcore Championship. At the time, the title was defended 24 hours a day, 7 days a week as established by Crash Holly. Because of this, WWF often ran matches wherein the champion was attacked and defeated in locations not typically associated with wrestling matches, such as backstage or in a hotel. With Blackman as champion, however, surprise attacks no longer resulted in title changes: within the matches, Blackman was so dangerous in hand-to-hand combat that surprise attacks were not effective enough to defeat him. During his stint as Hardcore Champion, Blackman's full martial arts talent was utilized. The first time he lost the title for a significant amount of time was against Shane McMahon, largely due to interference from Test, Albert, Edge, and Christian, with Mick Foley suspending the 24/7 rule to make sure McMahon didn't try to get out of facing Blackman in a rematch. At SummerSlam, Blackman fought McMahon for the title. During that match, they both climbed the TitanTron with Blackman able to knock Shane off with a Singapore cane, then performed a diving elbow drop for the pinfall. Blackman would go on to defend the title on several occasions, but he would ultimately lose the title on a more permanent basis to Raven in late 2000. At Unforgiven, he retained the WWF Hardcore Championship against Test, Funaki, Al Snow, Crash Holly, and Perry Saturn. Later, he was ordered by Shane McMahon to come out and speak after he accused Blackman of running over Stone Cold Steve Austin at Survivor Series the previous year. Before he could speak, Austin came down to the ring and stunned both Blackman and McMahon.

==== Final appearances (2001–2002) ====
Early in 2001, Blackman formed another tag team, this time with Grand Master Sexay. Blackman again played the straight-faced man: a recurring element was that Sexay would always try to convince Blackman to dance with him after their matches. In the summer of 2001, Sexay was released from his WWF contract. Blackman was then sidelined due to an injury. He made his last TV appearance on the June 25, 2001, episode of Raw with the APA and other mid-card superstars planning a fight against the WCW Invasion. In the fall of 2001, Blackman worked for Heartland Wrestling Association a developmental territory of the WWF. Blackman left WWE in October 2002.

=== Late career (2002–present) ===
On September 4, 2004, Blackman made one night appearance for Afa Anoa'i's World Xtreme Wrestling defeating Sugaa in Bushkill, Pennsylvania.

Blackman returned to WWE for a single night on the Raw 15th Anniversary Special on December 10, 2007, taking part in a battle royal. He was eliminated by Flash Funk.

In August 2010, Blackman was interviewed for regular WWE.com feature "Where Are They Now?", which features former superstars discussing their careers and current situations. Blackman recalled how he "loved doing hardcore matches" and that he had a "lot of good matches with Hardcore Holly, Kane, a bunch of those guys." On the subject of a return to the ring Blackman said: "Some days when I feel really good I get tempted" and "I miss being out there".

In 2013, Blackman appeared on The JBL and Cole Show, a show on WWE's YouTube channel.

In November 2024, Blackman appeared on From the WWE Vault on WWE's YouTube channel in which he introduced and discussed his SummerSlam 2000 match against Shane McMahon.

== Martial arts career ==
Blackman opened a self-defense school in Harrisburg, Pennsylvania called BlackmanMMA in mid-2003, teaching jujitsu and wrestling. Blackman and MMA fighter (UFC Hall of Famer) and wrestler Ken Shamrock were brought in to help promote a clothing line for professional fighters, called Ground 'n' Pound gear (GnP). As of July 2006, Blackman has re-opened Steve Blackman's Fighting Systems, which features MMA classes. Blackman has hosted four MMA events in Harrisburg, Pennsylvania starting in 2009 and the most recent being on November 20, 2010, at the Zembo Mosque. The events are part of the Pennsylvania Fighting Championships (PFC).

== Personal life ==
Blackman is married and has two children. He also works as a bail bondsman in the central Pennsylvania area.

== Championships and accomplishments ==
- Pro Wrestling Illustrated
  - PWI ranked him No. 70 of the best 500 singles wrestlers in the PWI 500 in 2001
- World Wrestling Federation
  - WWF Hardcore Championship (6 times)
