= Brothers of Destruction =

Professional wrestling tag team

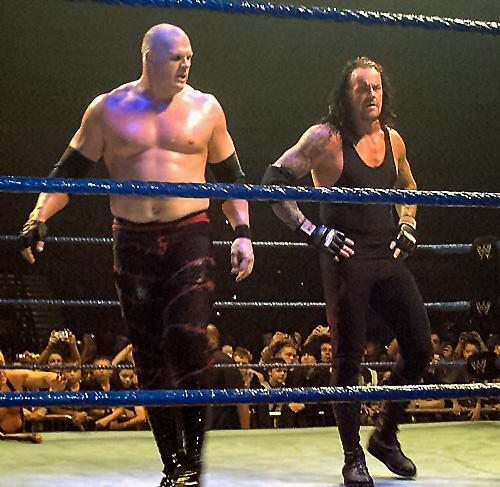
- Kane and The Undertaker in 2006

Tag team
- Name(s): Brothers of Destruction; Kane and The Undertaker
- Members: The Undertaker; Kane
- Billed heights: The Undertaker: 6 ft 10 in (2.08 m); Kane: 7 ft 0 in (2.13 m)
- Combined billed weight: 632 lb (287 kg)
- Debut: August 24, 1998
- Disbanded: November 22, 2020
- Years active: 1998–1999; 2000-2001; 2006–2010; 2012–2020

The Brothers of Destruction were a professional wrestling tag team in WWE composed of storyline half-brothers The Undertaker and Kane. Their storyline is widely regarded as one of the greatest and most iconic storylines in professional wrestling, the duo’s relationship alternated between periods of intense rivalry and dominant alliance. First introduced in the late 1990s, their supernatural personas and complex backstory captivated audiences. Together, they achieved significant success, including multiple championship victories, and are considered one of the most formidable and enduring tag teams in WWE history.

Their relationship was given a dark domestic backstory. It would become a WWE sibling relationship with Paul Bearer. Bearer was later revealed to be Kane's father. The Undertaker and Kane would both feud amongst themselves and would team up together as The Brothers of Destruction from 1997 until The Undertaker's retirement in 2020.

As the Brothers of Destruction, they won three tag team championships (two WWF Tag Team Championships and one WCW Tag Team Championship). Their on-again, off-again feuding was typically rooted in the harboring of unresolved, harsh feelings from the arson incident dating back to their youth.

== Fictional backstory ==
During The Undertaker's childhood, he had a little brother named Kane. The two were inseparable, spending every minute of every day together, causing destruction and chaos in their wake. However, young Kane soon became obsessed and fascinated with fire. One day, while The Undertaker was coming home from school, he returned to his parents' funeral home to find it completely burned to the ground, subsequently killing his parents as well as Kane — or so The Undertaker thought. It was soon discovered that Kane himself had started the fire, and Paul Bearer, who (oblivious to The Undertaker) was present during the fire, hid Kane in a mental asylum during the rest of Kane's youth into adulthood, eventually bringing him to the World Wrestling Federation to confront his brother. Unbeknownst to The Undertaker until spring 1998, his late mother had an affair with Bearer and, as a result, gave birth to Kane (therefore making Kane his half-brother). In the fall of 1998, The Undertaker admitted that he was actually the one that set fire to the funeral home, scarring Kane's face, and, in the same process, killing their mother and The Undertaker's father. To justify this, Undertaker stated that he had always known that Kane was the weaker and worthless of their mother's children, and sought to eliminate him with the fire.

While hiding his son away for years and apparently keeping this information confidential, Paul Bearer, in the meantime, joined the World Wrestling Federation and formed an alliance with The Undertaker. Bearer stood by his side for six years before eventually turning on him at SummerSlam 1996. After suffering repeated acts of retaliatory mistreatment at the hands of Undertaker, who was filled with rancor and bitterness over the betrayal incident, Bearer opted to exact vengeance of his own with an ultimatum: to either allow him to once again take over Undertaker as manager now that he had won the WWF Championship, or deal with the disclosure of his darkest secret. Feeling he had no choice in the matter, The Undertaker eventually obliged Bearer and became his protégé, though this was not like old times. While "managing" Undertaker this time around, Bearer took to abrasively overbearing and harassing behaviors towards him at every turn. At numerous points in which Undertaker attempted to take attitude, disobey, or even defend himself, Bearer would subjugate him by threatening exposure of the dark secret, forcing Undertaker to back down and comply with his orders each time. Eventually, Undertaker lost his patience and refused to allow Bearer to manage him any longer, leading to Bearer's exposure of the secret. At this point in time, The Undertaker denied the charges of committing the arson murders, claiming his younger brother, a "pyromaniac", was the culprit and, due to the incident, couldn't possibly be alive (note that Undertaker would reveal himself as the intentional arsonist a year later). Bearer accused The Undertaker of not only being a murderer but a liar, while The Undertaker continued to deny the charges. Kane had supposedly been hideously scarred by the fire — and to conceal Jacobs' identity — the character wore a mask, sported long hair, and wore red and black ring attire that almost covered his entire body. After being forced to unmask in 2003, it was revealed that Kane had no physical scars from the fire. Instead, it was explained that Kane's scars were more psychological in the form of severe body dysmorphia, convinced that he was hideously burned and scarred, when in fact the scars had either long since healed or had never existed at all.

== History ==
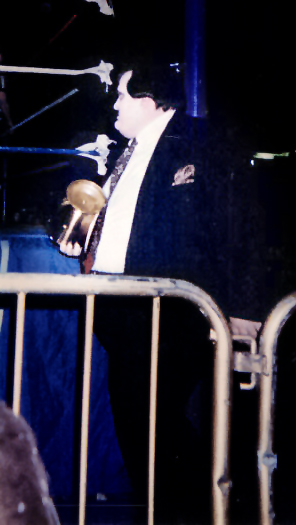
Paul Bearer, Undertaker's longtime manager and Kane's storyline father

=== Kane's debut and feud (1997–1999) ===
After The Undertaker won the WWF Championship from Sycho Sid at WrestleMania 13, he started a feud with Mankind, managed by his former manager Paul Bearer. The Bearer/Undertaker feud escalated at April's Revenge of the 'Taker: In Your House event when The Undertaker launched a fireball into the face of his former manager. During the following weeks and months, Bearer threatened the exposure of The Undertaker's "deepest, darkest secret". Finally, at Badd Blood: In Your House, Kane made his debut and interfered during the Hell in a Cell match between The Undertaker and Shawn Michaels.

During the following months, The Undertaker refused to wrestle Kane, stating he had promised their parents that he would never fight his own brother. This allowed Kane to frequently attack and humiliate The Undertaker on several occasions, as The Undertaker would not retaliate. At the 1998 Royal Rumble, Kane cost The Undertaker a casket match against WWF Champion Shawn Michaels and, after the match, Kane and Bearer locked The Undertaker in the casket and set it ablaze, leading everyone to believe The Undertaker had been killed. After two months of absence, The Undertaker returned and finally agreed to face Kane at WrestleMania XIV, which The Undertaker won after hitting Kane with three Tombstone Piledrivers. They met once again the following month in the first-ever Inferno match (Kane's signature match) at Unforgiven: In Your House, which again The Undertaker won.

At King of the Ring 1998, Kane challenged for the WWF Championship against then-current champion "Stone Cold" Steve Austin in a First Blood match, with the added stipulation that if Kane did not win the championship, he would set himself on fire. During the match, The Undertaker interfered with a steel chair and nailed Austin with the chair, which helped Kane to win the championship. The Undertaker then formed a partnership with Kane after he later revealed that he intentionally attacked Austin because he didn't want his brother to be burned. This led The Undertaker into a rivalry with Steve Austin, who later regained the WWF title from Kane, while Kane and Mankind won the WWF Tag Team Championship. At Fully Loaded: In Your House, the duo were forced to team up together and defeat Kane and Mankind to win the titles.

After Austin and The Undertaker dropped the titles back to Kane and Mankind, The Undertaker and Kane began to work as allies, facing the WWF Champion Steve Austin at Breakdown: In Your House in a triple threat match. Per stipulations put in place by Vince McMahon, The Undertaker and Kane were forbidden from pinning each other, making it a de facto handicap match. At the end of the title match, they pinned Austin at the same time following a double Chokeslam. The title was vacated since there was no clear winner, and both men faced each other the following month at Judgment Day: In Your House with Austin as the special referee. The Undertaker turned heel during the match, as he betrayed Kane to side with Paul Bearer. The match ended in a no contest as Austin attacked Undertaker. Their feud continued when The Undertaker faced Austin at Rock Bottom: In Your House in a Buried Alive match; during the match, Kane interfered and attacked The Undertaker, thus helping Austin get the win. The brothers then separated from each other and went on their own.

In early 1999, with Kane now a member of The Corporation, and The Undertaker now the leader of the Ministry of Darkness, they faced each other in their second Inferno match, which Undertaker once again won. In the summer of 1999, The Undertaker's Ministry of Darkness had disbanded, while Kane was involved in a lengthy partnership with X-Pac, with whom he won the WWF Tag Team Championship twice. The Undertaker then attempted to reunite the Brothers of Destruction, but Kane made the ultimate decision to stay loyal to X-Pac after learning The Undertaker only wanted to use him for his own selfish gains. Shortly after, The Undertaker would form The Unholy Alliance with Big Show, with whom he won the WWF Tag Team Championship twice, to feud with Kane and X-Pac. The Undertaker eventually was injured in the fall of 1999, with Kane going his own way again.

=== Tag team division dominance (2000–2001) ===
The Undertaker and Kane reunited again in the summer of 2000. At this time, The Undertaker had transformed into the "American Badass" biker identity, instead of the horror-themed Deadman identity he portrayed previously. He and Kane challenged Tag Team Champions Edge and Christian for the tag titles on an episode of Raw is War, but they were disqualified due to interference from Kurt Angle, so they didn't win the titles. On the August 14 episode of Raw is War, The Undertaker faced Chris Benoit in a match. After the match, as The Undertaker was being assaulted by both Benoit and Shane McMahon, Kane came to the ring, appearing to aid The Undertaker. Kane then turned on The Undertaker by chokeslamming him through the ring, and the two feuded with each other again. This culminated in a match at SummerSlam, which resulted in a no contest when The Undertaker unmasked Kane, causing him to flee the ring.

At the Royal Rumble in 2001, Kane and The Undertaker teamed up eliminating most of the field in the Royal Rumble match; Kane entered number 6 and finished second eliminating 11 wrestlers, while The Undertaker came in at number 25 and came sixth before being eliminated by Rikishi. The two reunited later that same month, and on the February 1 episode of SmackDown!, they defeated Rikishi and Haku in a First Blood match. They got a shot at the tag titles at No Way Out, facing the champions The Dudley Boyz (Bubba Ray and D-Von) and Edge and Christian in a tables match, but lost when Rikishi and Haku interfered. At WrestleMania X-Seven, Kane defeated Raven and Big Show to win the WWF Hardcore Championship, and The Undertaker defeated Triple H.

The Undertaker and Kane started focusing on then-Intercontinental Champion Triple H and WWF Champion Stone Cold Steve Austin, who had recently formed a surprise alliance known as the Two-Man Power Trip. They were granted an opportunity to face Austin and Triple H at Backlash, if they could defeat Edge and Christian in a no-disqualification match for the titles. On April 19 episode of SmackDown!, The Undertaker and Kane defeated Edge and Christian to win their first WWF Tag Team Championship as a team, despite interference from Austin and Triple H. As a result of winning the titles, the Brothers of Destruction earned the right to face Steve Austin and Triple H. At Backlash, all major titles were on the line but despite that, Triple H pinned Kane after using a sledgehammer, thus making him and Austin the new WWF Tag Team Champions as well as the WWF Intercontinental Champion and WWF Champion, respectively.

With Kane injured, The Undertaker began targeting Steve Austin and his WWF Championship. On an episode of Raw is War, The Undertaker was told by police officers that his wife Sara had been involved in a car accident; The Undertaker arrived home, only to find out that it was all a set-up by Austin. At Judgment Day, Kane defeated Triple H to win the WWF Intercontinental Championship in a chain match, despite interference from Austin. Later that night, Triple H interfered in The Undertaker's WWF Championship match, using his sledgehammer, allowing Austin to pin The Undertaker and retain his championship.

Diamond Dallas Page was The Undertaker's next target; Page wanted to become a big star like The Undertaker, and started a feud with him, taking The Undertaker's slogan, "I'll make you famous" quite literally. The basis of this feud involved Page constantly stalking The Undertaker's wife Sara, hoping to get the Undertaker's attention. On the August 9 episode of SmackDown!, the Brothers of Destruction defeated The Natural Born Thrillers (Chuck Palumbo and Sean O'Haire) to win the WCW Tag Team Championship. At SummerSlam, The Undertaker and Kane defeated Diamond Dallas Page and Kanyon in a steel cage match to win their second WWF Tag Team Championship and retain the WCW Tag Team Championship, thus briefly unifying the two titles for the first time. This also makes The Undertaker and Kane to be the first tag team in WWF to become a double tag team champions.

The Brothers of Destruction then began a feud with KroniK (Brian Adams and Bryan Clark), who were brought to WWF by Stevie Richards. Richards wanted revenge on The Undertaker for what happened to him on the April 26, 2001 episode of SmackDown!, when The Undertaker faced Richards' Right to Censor stable in a 4-on-1 handicap match, causing the stable to disband. On the September 17 episode of Raw is War, Kane and The Undertaker lost the WWF Tag Team Championship to The Dudley Boyz after KroniK interfered. At Unforgiven, they successfully defended their WCW tag titles against KroniK, before losing them to Booker T and Test on the following episode of SmackDown!. They continued on as a team representing the WWF side through to the end of the Alliance Invasion angle, including their participation at Invasion and Survivor Series, after which The Undertaker immediately turned heel once more and the two did not interact with each other for a long while.

=== Sporadic encounters (2002–2005) ===
The duo first appeared together in 2002's WWF draft, standing right next to each other when The Undertaker was drafted to the Raw brand. The duo next appeared together during the first few moments of No Mercy as they both respectively had title matches that night, with The Undertaker challenging Brock Lesnar for the WWE Championship inside Hell in a Cell and Kane defending his Intercontinental Championship in a unification match against Triple H for the World Heavyweight Championship. They next teamed up again unofficially at the Royal Rumble in 2003, but The Undertaker turned on Kane during the Royal Rumble match and eliminated him. Later that year at the Survivor Series, an unmasked and heel Kane interfered in the Buried Alive match between The Undertaker and Mr. McMahon, costing The Undertaker the match. Kane would go on to say that The Undertaker was buried forever, claiming he did it because his brother was no longer a monster, and instead had become just one of the people. The two would end the feud with a match at WrestleMania XX in 2004, in which The Undertaker returned to his "Deadman" identity, and defeated Kane.

The demonic duo had a short run-in with each other in 2005; at the Royal Rumble, The Undertaker faced off against Heidenreich in a casket match. Before the match, Gene Snitsky, who was in a feud with Kane, told Heidenreich he would help him that night. Due to the interference, Heidenreich was positioned to win. However, when the casket was asked to be opened, Kane emerged from the casket coming to his aid, attacked, and battled Snitsky out of the arena, allowing his brother, The Undertaker to defeat Heidenreich and gain the victory. Originally, initial plans were for this to lead up to a tag team match between the four at WrestleMania 21, but the match was scrapped when The Undertaker instead decided to take on Randy Orton, and Kane would compete in the Money in the Bank ladder match.

The last time Kane and The Undertaker would meet in 2005 was during an interpromotional match where neither of the men from Raw or SmackDown! were involved. While Kane, who was helping his partner Big Show against Rey Mysterio, pretended to leave when The Undertaker entered the arena, he would inevitably receive a chokeslam from Undertaker after a failed sneak attack. Notably, both brothers were faces at the time, however Kane was a member of the Raw brand and The Undertaker was a member of the SmackDown! brand. Because the match was held on SmackDown! (and the SmackDown! brand was portrayed more favorably in that year's brand warfare storyline), Kane and Big Show were portrayed as tweeners without ever officially turning in that direction.

=== Brothers of Destruction reunions (2006–2010) ===
The return of the Brothers of Destruction was announced on the October 27, 2006 episode of SmackDown! when Montel Vontavious Porter (MVP) interfered with Kane's match against Mr. Kennedy, helping Kennedy beat down on him. As a result of the interference, General Manager Theodore Long scheduled a tag team match pitting the Brothers of Destruction against Kennedy and MVP. The next week on SmackDown!, the Brothers of Destruction reunited for the first time as a tag team in five years and gathered three wins over MVP and Kennedy in that one night. The first two wins were made by countout, and disqualification at which point General Manager Theodore Long twice came out and restarted the match with no disqualifications or countouts. Finally, the brothers hit simultaneous chokeslams, and The Undertaker finished with a Tombstone Piledriver to Mr. Kennedy.

The brothers continued their rivalry with their individual opponents before reuniting for a rematch on the last SmackDown! before Armageddon. This time, the match would go to a double disqualification as Kennedy threatened to run over Kane with a hearse parked ringside. The Undertaker, who had run off MVP, emerged in the passenger seat as his gong tolled and the lights went out, thus scaring Kennedy out of the vehicle. At Armageddon, The Undertaker defeated Kennedy in a Last Ride match, which was why the hearse had been at ringside for the last two weeks, and Kane defeated MVP earlier in an inferno match. The next week on SmackDown!, the Brothers would reunite once again, defeating King Booker and Finlay, before parting ways as Kane began a rivalry with The Great Khali while The Undertaker successfully pursued the World Heavyweight Championship at WrestleMania 23.

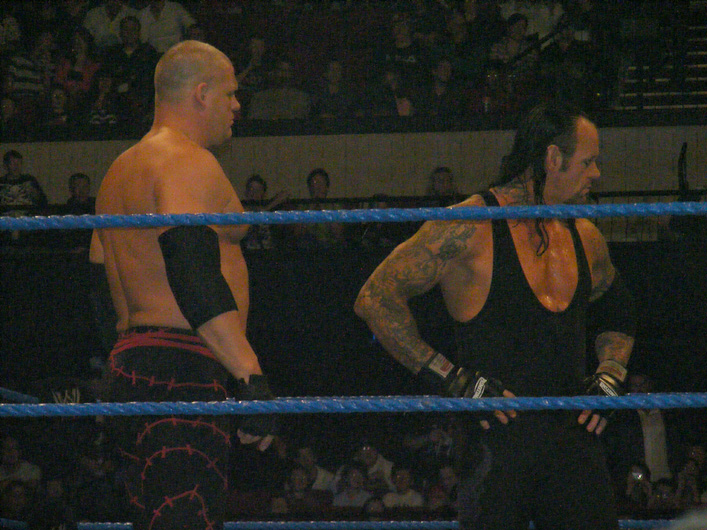
The Brothers of Destruction in June 2008

On the October 12, 2007 episode of SmackDown!, the Brothers of Destruction reunited for the first time in 2007, defeating then-WWE Tag Team Champions MVP and Matt Hardy in a non-title match. The Brothers of Destruction reunited again in 2008 on the February 1 episode of SmackDown, defeating Big Daddy V and Mark Henry by submission. At WrestleMania XXIV, after Kane won a 24-man Battle Royal and used a sneak attack, gaining the second ever WrestleMania record for the fastest pin later that night, and The Undertaker, after winning the SmackDown Elimination Chamber match earning his number one contender shot at No Way Out, both brothers became world champions: Kane winning the ECW Championship from Chavo Guerrero, and The Undertaker winning the World Heavyweight Championship from Edge.

On the April 4, 2008 episode of SmackDown, The Undertaker and Kane faced each other for the first time since WrestleMania XX. The match finished with no decision as "La Familia" (Edge, Chavo Guerrero, and Curt Hawkins and Zack Ryder) interfered. In tandem, however, Kane and The Undertaker delivered a Chokeslam and Tombstone Piledriver to Chavo and Edge respectively. The Brothers of Destruction also made an appearance when ECW traveled to London, England on April 15, 2008, facing then-WWE Tag Team Champions John Morrison and The Miz who also fell victim to tandem chokeslams. On the April 21, 2008 episode of Raw, the Brothers of Destruction teamed with John Cena and Triple H to take on the team of John "Bradshaw" Layfield (JBL), Chavo Guerrero, and the one night only reunion of Rated-RKO (Edge and Randy Orton) in a losing effort, after Edge hit Kane with a spear. On the November 13, 2009 episode of SmackDown, after his match with Chris Jericho ended after interference from Jericho's partner Big Show, Kane came to the aid of his brother to chase off Jeri-Show. The Brothers of Destruction would reunite on the November 20 episode to face Jeri-Show, but the match ended in no contest, and Jericho subsequently fled the ring during the match after pilfering The Undertaker's championship belt.

=== Final feud (2009–2010) ===
On the June 4 episode of SmackDown, SmackDown General Manager Theodore Long announced that The Undertaker was found in a vegetative state by Kane, who vowed to out the identity of The Undertaker's attacker, and for weeks he accused and interrogated other superstars. At Money in the Bank, Kane won the Money in the Bank ladder match to win a World Heavyweight Championship title shot any time, anywhere. Later that night, Kane chased off one of The Undertaker's potential attackers, Jack Swagger, who was attacking Rey Mysterio. Kane then returned to cash in his Money in the Bank contract to win the World Heavyweight Championship. Kane would then claim that Rey Mysterio was The Undertaker's attacker, although Mysterio denied it. At SummerSlam, Kane defended his championship against Mysterio, during which The Undertaker returned to confront Kane and Rey Mysterio. The Undertaker, however, was tombstoned by Kane, who was revealed to be The Undertaker's attacker the entire time, Thus resulted in a feud between the two.

Kane and The Undertaker met at Night of Champions, which The Undertaker lost. Kane had seemingly grown stronger than his older half-brother (seemingly resolving previously unfinished business from their youth when The Undertaker set Kane on fire as teenagers, later reasoning that it was because Kane was "too weak"). In an attempt to regain momentum over Kane, The Undertaker was boosted by the return of his former manager/Kane's father, Paul Bearer (who hadn't been seen in years, since June 2004 when The Undertaker betrayed Bearer by drowning him in a crypt of cement, seemingly paying Bearer back for his unforgettable act of betrayal at SummerSlam 1996 and following acts of introducing Kane).

With Bearer by The Undertaker's side like old times, the two brothers squared off again at the Hell in a Cell pay-per-view in a Hell in a Cell match for the World Heavyweight Championship. Bearer, however, betrayed The Undertaker by blinding him with the urn, allowing Kane to chokeslam The Undertaker for the victory (repaying Undertaker for the Concrete Crypt burial at The Great American Bash). The feud culminated in what would be the brothers' final one-on-one match, a Buried Alive match at Bragging Rights, in which The Undertaker once again lost and in his own specialty match, this time resulting in part from interference by The Nexus.

=== Brief reunions and final tag match (2012–2020) ===
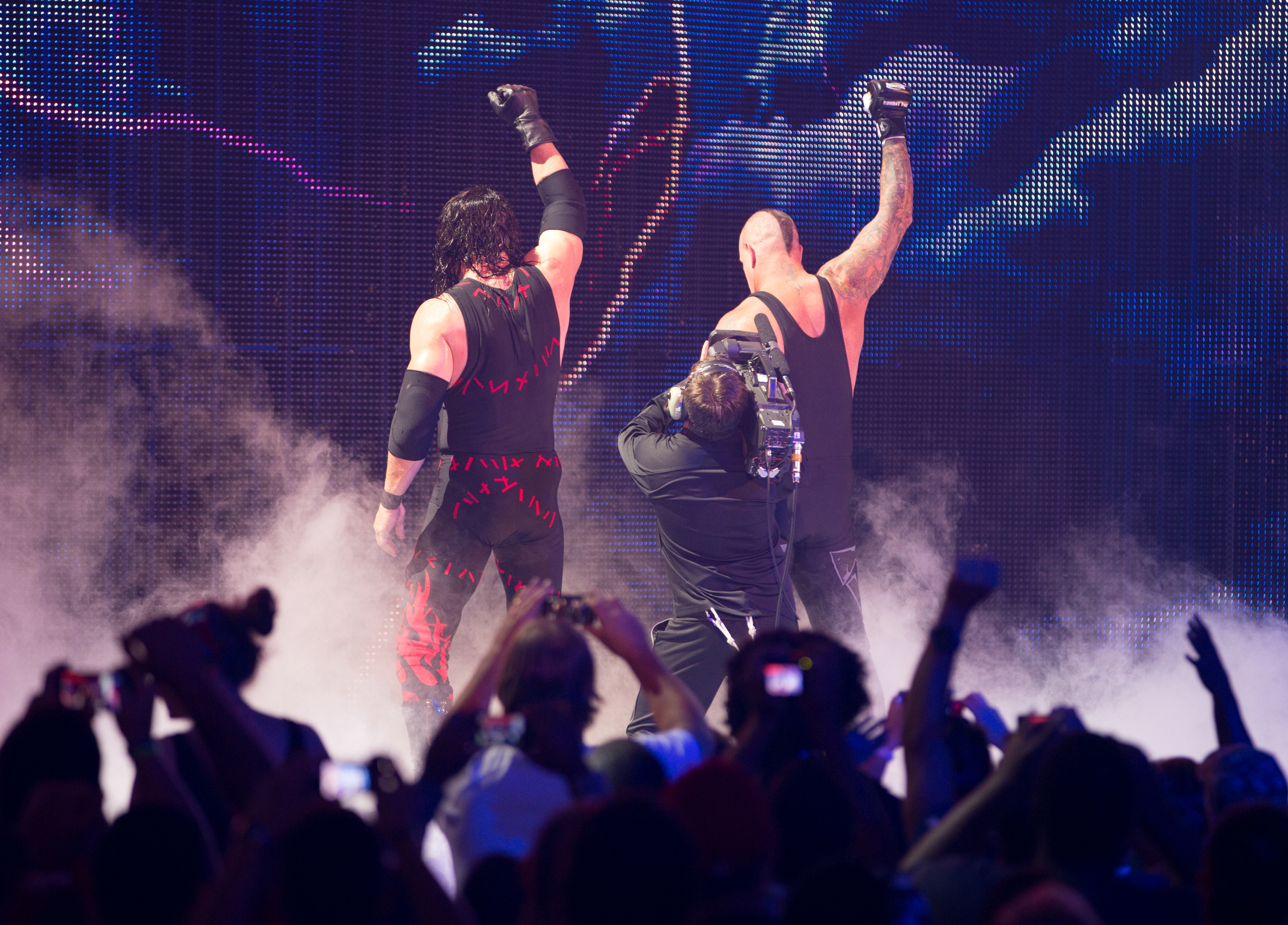
The Brothers of Destruction making their exit at Raw 1000

On July 23, 2012 during Raw 1000, the Brothers of Destruction reunited against Jinder Mahal, Curt Hawkins, Tyler Reks, Hunico, Camacho and Drew McIntyre. The Undertaker and Kane were once again reunited on the March 11, 2013 episode of Raw following the real-life death of Paul Bearer, when they paid a final tribute to Paul Bearer. On the April 8, 2013 episode of Raw, The Undertaker had a match with Kane and his Team Hell No tag partner Daniel Bryan against The Shield. At Survivor Series 2015, The Brothers of Destruction defeated Bray Wyatt and Luke Harper in a tag team match.

They had a final feud when, at Super Show-Down, Kane acompanied Undertaker to a match against Triple H, who was acompained by Shawn Michaels. After the match, both teams faced each other at Crown Jewel, where Kane and Undertaker were defeated, being their last match together. At Survivor Series 2020, Kane, alongside other WWE superstars and legends, returned for The Undertaker's retirement ceremony. After their retirements, Kane was inducted into the WWE Hall of Fame in 2021 and Undertaker in 2022.

== Championships and accomplishments ==
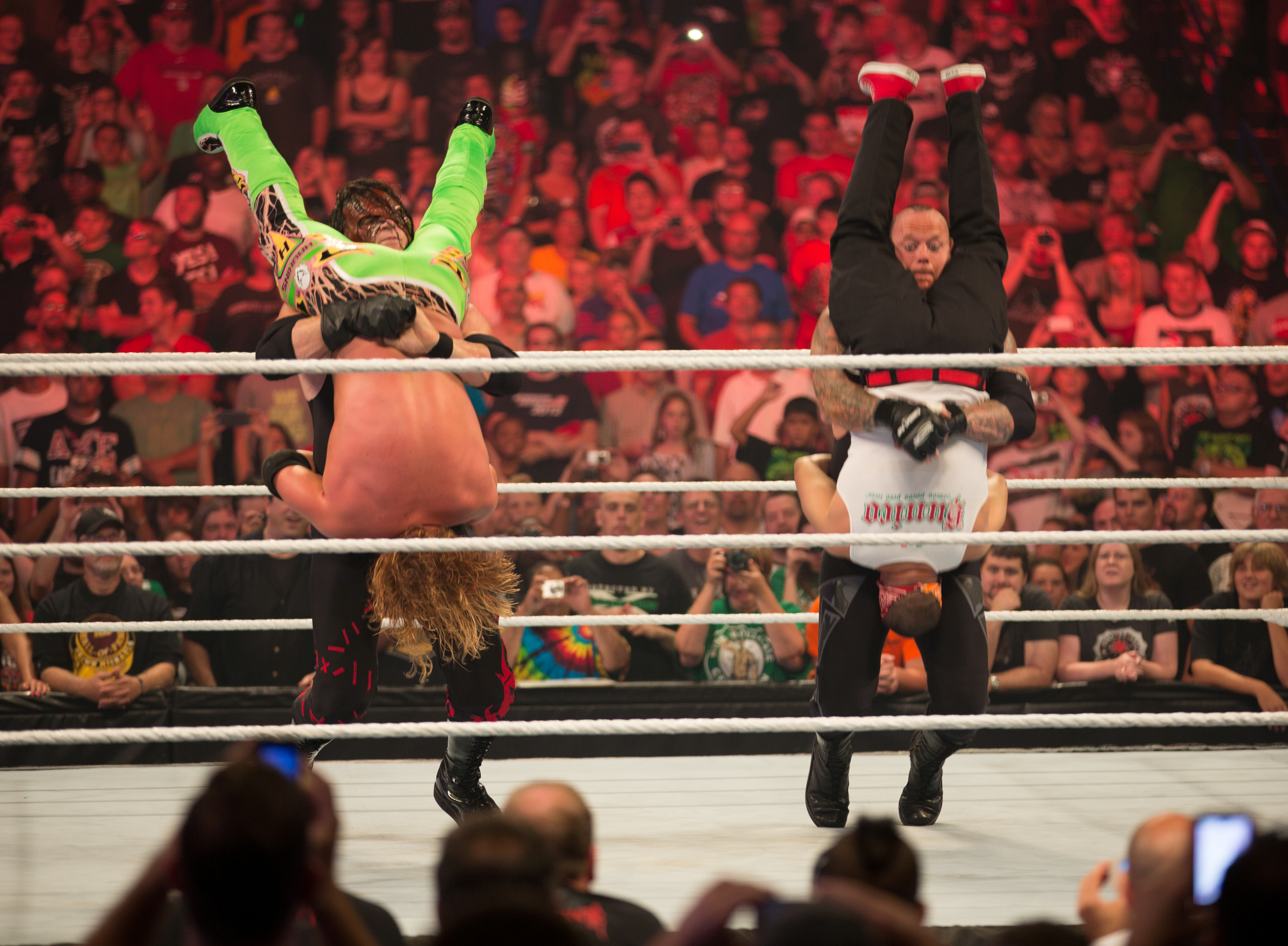
The Brothers of Destruction hit simultaneous Tombstone Piledrivers to Curt Hawkins and Hunico

- CBS Sports
  - Worst Angle of the Year (2018) vs. Triple H and Shawn Michaels
- Pro Wrestling Illustrated
  - Manager of the Year (1998) – Paul Bearer
- World Wrestling Federation/WWE
  - WWF Hardcore Championship (1 time) – Kane
  - WWF Intercontinental Championship (1 time) – Kane
  - WWF Tag Team Championship (2 times)
  - WCW Tag Team Championship (1 time) (Note: The Brothers of Destruction won title during The Invasion and also held the WWF Tag Team Championship at the same time, thus briefly unifying the two championships, however they defended and lost each title on separate occasions.)
- Wrestling Observer Newsletter
  - Worst Worked Match of the Year (2001) vs. KroniK at Unforgiven
  - Worst Worked Match of the Year (2018) vs. D-Generation X at Crown Jewel
