= Lloyd Youngblood =

American neurosurgeon (born 1946)

Lloyd Youngblood (born in Beaumont, Texas in 1946) is an American neurosurgeon. He was the chief of the Department of Neurosurgery at Methodist Hospital in San Antonio, Texas until December 2002. He is the VP of the South Texas Organ Bank. Working extensively with professional wrestlers, Youngblood has performed neck surgery on several professional wrestlers, including Kurt Angle, Chris Benoit, Edge, Lita, Gregory Helms, Bob Holly, Scotty 2 Hotty, Test and Rhyno. He has also worked extensively with "Stone Cold" Steve Austin and Matt and Jeff Hardy.

== Early life and education ==
Lloyd Youngblood received his Bachelor of Arts degree from Rice University in 1969. He graduated with honors from Baylor College of Medicine in 1973 and carried out his internship and residency at Walter Reed Army Medical Center in Washington, D.C.

== Career ==
He stayed in the Army for the next 20 years, becoming assistant chief of the Neurological Surgery Service at Landstuhl Army Regional Medical Center in Germany from 1979 to 1982, and becoming chief of the Neurological Surgery Service at Brooke Army Medical Center, Fort Sam Houston in San Antonio, Texas, from 1983 to 1989. He retired from the Army in 1989.

Lloyd Youngblood went on to join the medical staff at Methodist Hospital in San Antonio. In 2000, he performed an anterior cervical discectomy on professional wrestler "Stone Cold" Steve Austin, allowing him to regain his WWE Championship and extend his career by another 3 years. At the time, Austin's injury was the worst of its type that Youngblood had ever seen in his professional career. He later performed a similar operation on Chris Benoit, his 4-hour surgery being recorded and televised on several World Wrestling Entertainment (WWE) shows. After his fame in performing neck operations increased, he performed neck fusions on Bob Holly, Amy Dumas (Lita), Terry Gerin (Rhyno), Andrew "Test" Martin in 2004, and several others. He has also operated on Gary DeLaune, a reporter for KENS television station.
