= WrestleMania X-Seven =

2001 World Wrestling Federation pay-per-view event

- Promotional poster featuring "Stone Cold" Steve Austin, The Rock, and the Reliant Astrodome
- Promotion: World Wrestling Federation
- Date: April 1, 2001
- City: Houston, Texas
- Venue: Reliant Astrodome
- Attendance: 67,925
- Buy rate: 1,040,000
- Tagline: Houston We Have a Problem...

Pay-per-view chronology
← Previous; No Way Out	Next → Backlash

WrestleMania chronology
← Previous; 2000	Next → X8

WrestleMania X-Seven, also known as WrestleMania 17, was a 2001 professional wrestling pay-per-view (PPV) event produced by the World Wrestling Federation (WWF, now WWE). It was the 17th annual WrestleMania and took place on April 1, 2001, at the Reliant Astrodome in Houston, Texas, marking the first WrestleMania held in the U.S. state of Texas.

Twelve matches were contested at the event, including one broadcast exclusively on the Sunday Night Heat pre-show on MTV. The main event was a No Disqualification match between The Rock and "Stone Cold" Steve Austin for the WWF Championship. The undercard included Triple H versus The Undertaker, the second Tables, Ladders, and Chairs match for the WWF Tag Team Championship, and a Street Fight between Vince McMahon and Shane McMahon with Mick Foley as special guest referee. This also saw the WrestleMania debut of Paul Heyman, which was his only time on commentary.

A record-breaking attendance for the Reliant Astrodome of 67,925 grossed US$3.5 million. Many in professional wrestling consider WrestleMania X-Seven to be the pinnacle of the company's famous Attitude Era, similar to how WrestleMania III was the pinnacle of the 1980s professional wrestling boom. The WWF bought out rival competition World Championship Wrestling (WCW) the week prior. In addition to its commercial success, the event has received acclaim from critics and fans, and is often regarded as the greatest WrestleMania of all time, and the greatest professional wrestling pay-per-view event ever produced.

== Production ==
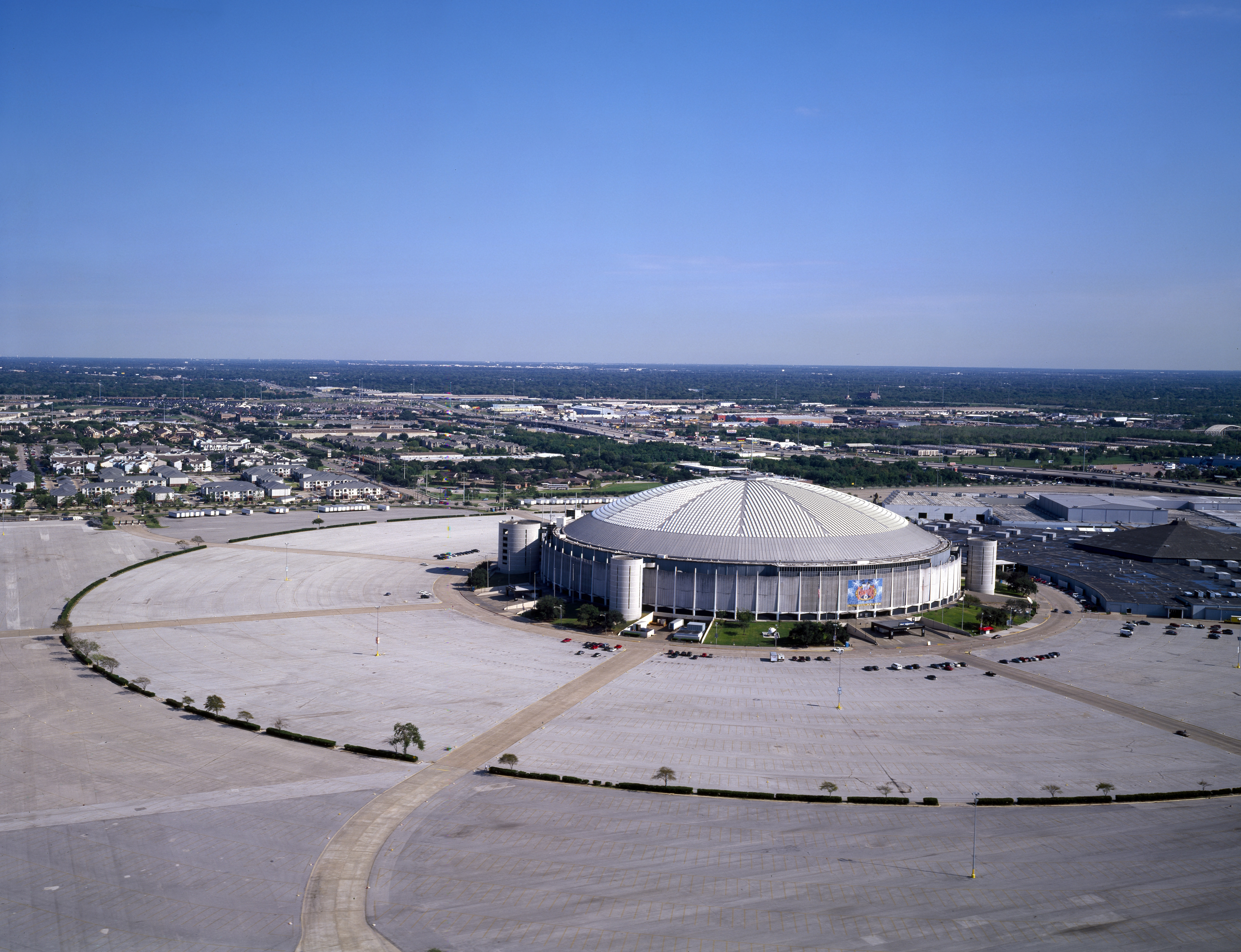
The 17th annual WrestleMania, promoted as WrestleMania X-Seven, took place at the Reliant Astrodome in Houston, Texas.

=== Background ===
WrestleMania is considered the World Wrestling Federation's (WWF, now WWE) flagship professional wrestling pay-per-view (PPV) event, having first been held in 1985. It has become the longest-running professional wrestling event in history and is held annually between mid-March to mid-April. It was the first of the WWF's original four pay-per-views, which includes Royal Rumble, SummerSlam, and Survivor Series, referred to as the "Big Four", and was considered one of the "Big Five" PPVs with the addition of King of the Ring in 1993.

On April 3, 2000, the WWF announced that WrestleMania 17, stylized as WrestleMania X-Seven, was scheduled to be held on April 1, 2001, at the Reliant Astrodome in Houston, Texas, the first WrestleMania held in the U.S. state of Texas. Tickets went on sale to the general public on November 11, 2000, with 50,000 tickets sold on the first day.

=== Other WrestleMania Week events ===
In addition to the event, WrestleMania Fan Axxess was held at the Reliant Hall, which expanded upon the event by adding numerous activities including areas where attendees could buy special merchandise, see a production truck, and numerous WWF vehicles were on display. WWF taped SmackDown! at the Joe Louis Arena in Detroit, Michigan on March 27, 2001, as the final event before WrestleMania X-Seven and then following night after WrestleMania, Raw is War, took place at the Fort Worth Convention Center in Fort Worth, Texas on April 2, 2001.

=== Storylines ===
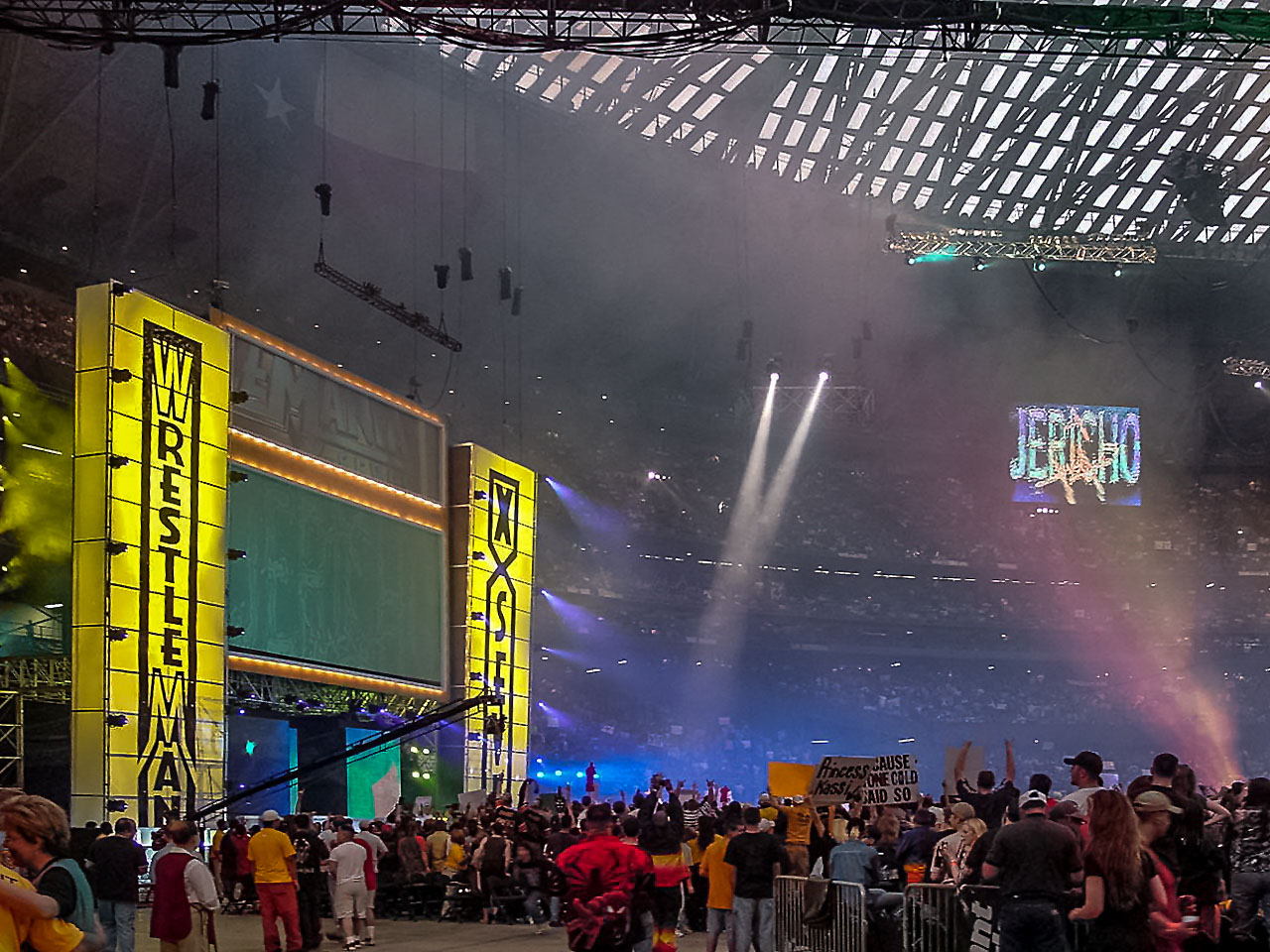
The WrestleMania X-Seven stage

The event included 11 matches that each resulted from scripted storylines. Results were predetermined by writers of the WWF, while storylines were produced on WWF's weekly television shows, Raw is War and SmackDown! along with its supplementary programs, Sunday Night Heat and Jakked/Metal.

==== Major matches ====
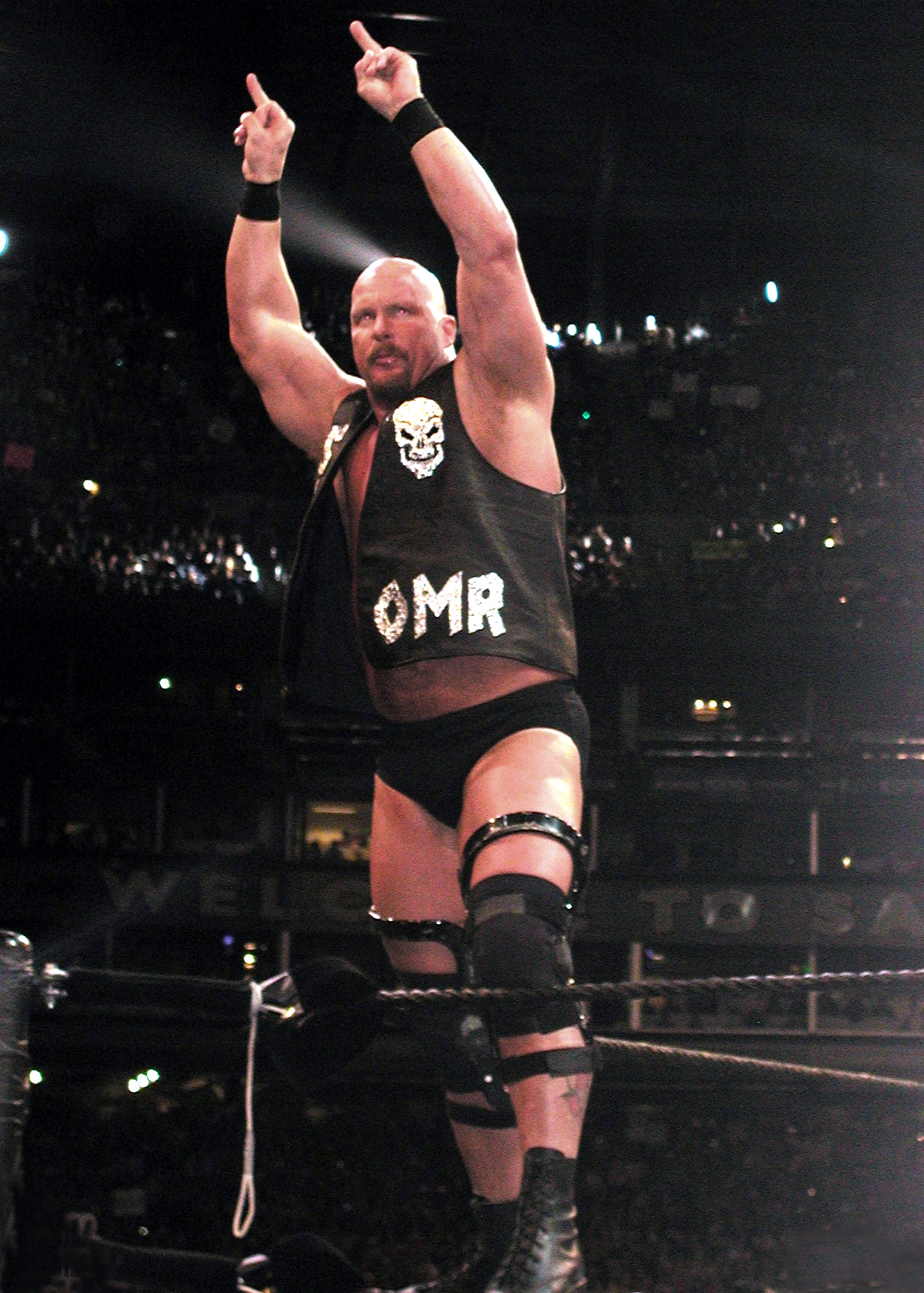
"Stone Cold" Steve Austin, challenger for the WWF Championship

The main feud leading into WrestleMania X-Seven involved "Stone Cold" Steve Austin challenging The Rock for the WWF Championship. The Rock and Austin had fought for the WWF Championship at WrestleMania XV and Backlash in 1999. Austin earned his opportunity to compete for the WWF Championship at WrestleMania X-Seven by winning the 2001 Royal Rumble match when he last eliminated Kane, while The Rock became the first ever six-time WWF Champion when he defeated Kurt Angle at No Way Out. During their feud, Austin's wife Debra, who was trying to get back into managing, was ordered by WWF chairman, Vince McMahon, to be The Rock's manager against her wishes as well as both The Rock and Austin's. As a result, Austin stated that he would hold both The Rock and McMahon responsible if any harm came to her. On the March 12 episode of Raw is War, The Rock was placed in an excruciating Ankle Lock submission hold during his rematch with Kurt Angle. When Debra went to check on The Rock, Angle also placed her into an Ankle Lock. Austin soon ran in to save her and knocked Angle out of the ring. Keeping to his word, he immediately gave The Rock a Stone Cold Stunner as punishment. The following week on Raw is War, during a handicap tag team match involving The Rock, Chris Jericho, Kurt Angle, Chris Benoit, and William Regal, Austin made his way down to the ring and ended up getting a Rock Bottom from The Rock in response to the Stunner from the previous week. On the March 29 episode of SmackDown!, Debra was relieved from her managerial role by Mr. McMahon after failing to prevent a brawl between The Rock and Austin.

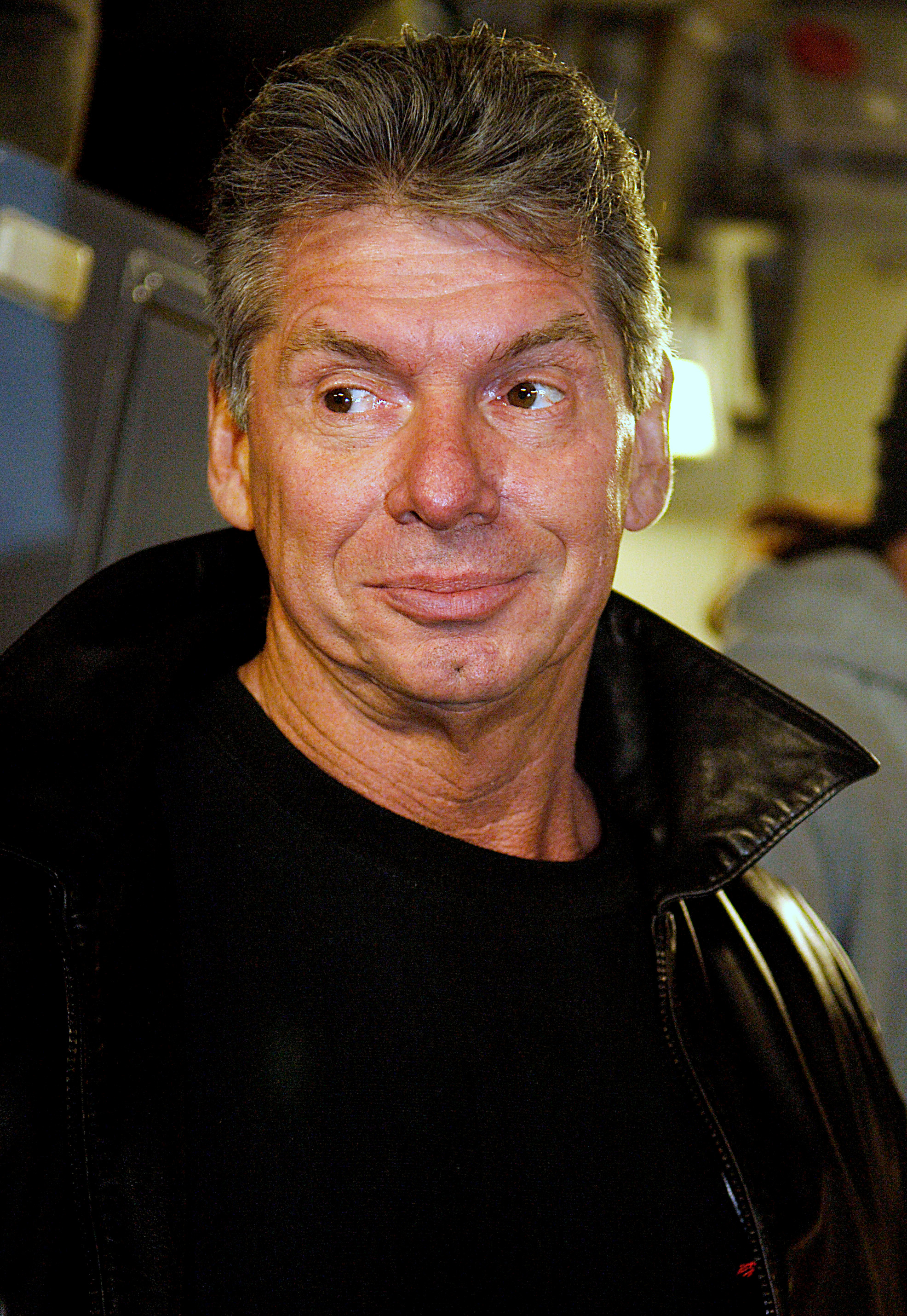
Vince McMahon fought his son Shane at WrestleMania.

Another major feud that was built up in the lead to WrestleMania was the one involving Vince McMahon and his son Shane McMahon. The feud started with Vince's disapproval of Mick Foley's job as then-WWF commissioner, as well as Foley's decision of holding a six-man Hell in a Cell match at Armageddon 2000, taking into consideration about the well-being of the wrestlers involved in the match. Despite McMahon's attempts to overrule Foley's authority, Foley was given full support by Linda McMahon, Vince's wife and the WWF's CEO. Not pleased with this result, Vince immediately demanded a divorce from Linda. Shortly after Armageddon, secretly to Vince's delight, it was revealed that Linda was rushed to a hospital suffering with a nervous breakdown brought on by the impending divorce. With Linda hospitalized, the Board of Directors appointed Vince as the new interim CEO of the WWF, allowing him to officially fire Foley as commissioner. With Linda in a coma-like state, Vince started to have a public affair with Trish Stratus. Vince's daughter, Stephanie McMahon-Helmsley, was (at first) far from pleased about the turn of events. At No Way Out, Stephanie and Trish squared off, with Stephanie scoring the victory after a run-in by William Regal. On the February 26 episode of Raw is War, however, during a match that placed Vince and Trish against Stephanie and William Regal, Stratus was turned on by the other three participants in the match and had sewage dumped over her. In the following weeks, Vince continued to demean Trish by having her do such actions as bark like a dog around the ring and stripping down to her lingerie. Despite this, Trish remained loyal to Vince and even begged for his forgiveness. On the March 12 episode of Raw is War, Shane McMahon made his return to the WWF. Angry with his father's actions, Shane started to throw punches at Vince only to be stopped by William Regal. Shane explained his actions on the following episode of SmackDown!, stating that anger was a result of frustrations over the manipulation of his sister, his mother's state and Vince's heinous treatment of Trish. On March 23, the WWF purchased the assets of their longtime rival promotion, World Championship Wrestling (WCW) from AOL Time Warner. With it, the purchase brought in an extra twist to the storyline. On the March 26 episode of Raw is War (which was held at Gund Arena in Cleveland, Ohio), Vince McMahon made a live speech that was also simulcast on the final episode of WCW Monday Nitro (which was held in Panama City Beach, Florida). In the speech, Vince announced that the signing was not final and that he wanted Ted Turner to come to WrestleMania and hand-deliver the contract for signing. Vince then promised that with the purchase he was going to bury his rival forever, as well as any wrestler associated with WCW. However, Shane, who was at the venue for Nitro, interrupted the speech and said:

Because, dad, the deal is finalized with WCW. And the name on the contract does say "McMahon"....however, the contract reads "Shane McMahon". That's right! I now own WCW! And, dad, just like WCW did in the past, how it kicked your ass in the past and it will again, that's exactly what's going to happen to you this Sunday at WrestleMania!

— Shane McMahon on the series finale of WCW Monday Nitro, talking to Vince McMahon who was at Raw is War.

Oh my god! I don't believe it! I do not believe what we just heard!
Shane McMahon has bought WCW, and Mr. McMahon is in absolute shock!

— Jim Ross, play-by-play commentator for the Raw is War episode before the event.

To make matters worse for Vince, Mick Foley appeared shortly afterward that same night and revealed that prior to his firing, Linda had made multiple contracts for him to sign. One of those contracts was for Foley to referee a match of his choice at WrestleMania. Foley then chose the match between Vince and Shane, which was designated a street fight.

==== Undercard matches ====
The secondary feud leading into the event pitted The Brothers of Destruction (The Undertaker and Kane) against Triple H and Big Show. After defeating "Stone Cold" Steve Austin in a Three Stages of Hell match at No Way Out, Triple H felt that he deserved to be in the WrestleMania main event having defeated everyone in the WWF, including The Rock and Austin. The Undertaker took exception to that and told Triple H that he had never defeated him. Before WrestleMania X-Seven, the two had never faced each other in a one-on-one match on a pay-per-view event. During his entrance for a Hardcore Championship match against Big Show, Triple H ambushed The Undertaker. Kane ran in and saved The Undertaker from a further attack, but was met with his own ambush by Big Show. On the following episode of SmackDown!, The Undertaker tried to break into the limousine of Triple H and his wife, Stephanie McMahon-Helmsley, upon arrival but ended up being arrested by the police. As a result, Kane requested a match against Triple H later that night, but lost when Big Show interfered on behalf of Triple H. In retaliation, Kane interfered in Big Show's Hardcore Championship match against Raven on Raw is War, helping Raven pin Big Show to become the new Hardcore Champion. The Undertaker's arrest led to a restraining order from Stephanie. To circumvent this, the Brothers of Destruction interfered in Triple H's match against Test, with Kane ordered to chase after Stephanie. With Stephanie held hostage by Kane on a balcony in the arena, WWF commissioner William Regal gave The Undertaker and Kane matches at WrestleMania against Triple H and Big Show respectively, and The Undertaker told Kane to set Stephanie free. After being attacked during a Hardcore Championship title defense, Regal would later include Raven into Kane and Big Show's match, making it a Triple Threat Hardcore match for the Hardcore Championship.

At the Royal Rumble, Chyna (kayfabe) injured her neck during a match with Ivory, causing her to lose the match and fail to capture the Women's Championship. In order for Chyna to again challenge for the title, Ivory required the match contract to include a "hold harmless" clause, meaning that if Ivory injured Chyna's neck again, there could be no legal recourse against Ivory. In doing so, the contract also included a provision to ban Ivory's Right To Censor (RTC) stablemates from ringside.

== Event ==
Other on-screen personnel
Role:	Name:
English commentators	Jim Ross
English commentators	Paul Heyman
English commentators	Bobby Heenan (Gimmick battle royal)
English commentators	Gene Okerlund (Gimmick battle royal)
Spanish commentators	Carlos Cabrera
Spanish commentators	Hugo Savinovich
Backstage Interviewers	Jonathan Coachman
Backstage Interviewers	Michael Cole
Backstage Interviewers	Kevin Kelly
Ring announcer	Howard Finkel
Referees	Mike Chioda
Referees	Jack Doan
Referees	Earl Hebner
Referees	Jim Korderas
Referees	Theodore Long
Referees	Chad Patton
Referees	Mike Sparks
Referees	Tim White

=== Pre-show match ===
Before the event aired live on pay-per-view, a pre-show match was aired with Steve Blackman and Grand Master Sexay squaring off against X-Factor members X-Pac and Justin Credible on a live episode of Sunday Night Heat. Near the end of the match, fellow X-Factor member Albert interfered by pulling Sexay out of the ring, allowing X-Pac and Credible to hit their X Marks the Spot finisher on Blackman for the win.

=== Preliminary matches ===
The first match of the event was the WWF Intercontinental Championship match between Chris Jericho and WWF commissioner William Regal. During the match, Regal exposed one of the top turnbuckles to throw Jericho's shoulder into it before giving him a double underhook superplex. Jericho attempted the Walls of Jericho submission hold, but had it reversed into a Regal Stretch. After Jericho managed to grab a ring rope to break the hold, he retaliated with numerous chops before throwing Regal into the exposed turnbuckle and finishing him off with a Lionsault to retain the Intercontinental Championship.

Tazz and The APA (Bradshaw and Faarooq) took on Right to Censor (The Goodfather, Val Venis, and Bull Buchanan) next in a short match that ended with Bradshaw pinning The Goodfather after a Clothesline from Hell.

The third match was the triple threat hardcore match between Raven, Kane and The Big Show for the WWF Hardcore Championship. Raven came out with a shopping cart full of weapons. Kane and Raven began fighting before Big Show made his entrance. During the match, the three wrestlers fought their way out of the ring and through the crowd into the backstage area. Big Show tried to lock himself, Raven and the referee in a security cage but Kane broke the padlock and afterward threw Raven through a glass window. Big Show and Kane continued to brawl ending with the two throwing each other through a wall. Raven tried to escape by driving off in a golf cart, but Big Show stopped him and caused him to crash. The golf cart also ran over some cords that allegedly almost knocked the power out to the entire building. Kane shortly followed with another golf cart, accompanied by the referee, and ran into Raven. The fight headed back into the stadium with Big Show attempting to press slam Raven off the entrance stage but both were kicked off it by Kane. Kane followed this with a diving leg drop off the stage onto Big Show, pinning him to become the new Hardcore Champion.

The fourth match was the WWF European Championship match between Test and Eddie Guerrero. During the match, Test went over the top rope, but got his foot caught between the top two ropes, forcing the referee and Guerrero to have to untangle him. With the help of his fellow Radicalz members Dean Malenko and Perry Saturn, Guerrero hit Test in the face with the European Championship belt while the referee was distracted and pinned him to become the new champion.

The fifth match pitted Kurt Angle against Chris Benoit. The match started with mat wrestling between the two, but Angle soon punched Benoit out of frustration and threw him out of the ring, so he could throw him into the broadcast table and the steel steps. Back in the ring, both men tried to submit their opponent using the other's signature hold with Benoit using the ankle lock on Angle, and Angle using the Crippler Crossface on Benoit. Benoit eventually succeeded in forcing Angle to tap out to the Crippler Crossface, but the referee was knocked down and did not see it. Near the end of the match, Benoit tried to pin Angle after a diving headbutt but was met with a two-count. Angle then quickly rolled-up Benoit, using the tights for leverage to win the match.

The following match saw Chyna challenge the WWF Women's Champion Ivory. After an early bit of offense from Ivory, Chyna performed a Chynabomb and looked to have the pinfall, but picked Ivory up after the 2-count. Chyna then performed a gorilla press drop and nonchalantly pinned Ivory to win the Women's Championship.

The seventh match was the street fight between Shane McMahon and Vince McMahon with Mick Foley as the special guest referee. Shane dominated his father during the earlier part of the match by attacking him with various weapons such as a kendo stick and monitors from the Spanish broadcast table. Shane laid Vince on said table and performed a diving elbow drop off the top rope but his sister, Stephanie, pulled Vince out of the way, causing Shane to crash through it. Trish Stratus then came towards the ring, pushing a seemingly comatose Linda McMahon out in a wheelchair. Trish then slapped Vince, officially turning face in the process, causing her and Stephanie to get into a fight that led them out of the stadium. As referee Foley tried to wheel Linda out to safety, Vince hit him with a steel chair, and then pulled Linda into the ring to make her watch as he beat down Shane with a garbage can. However, Linda stood up and low-blowed Vince, allowing Foley to recover and attack him. With Vince prone in the corner, Shane placed a garbage can in front of Vince's face and hit a Coast-to-Coast dropkick, pinning his father to win the match.

The eighth match, dubbed "TLC II", was the Tables, Ladders, and Chairs match for the WWF Tag Team Championship between the Hardy Boyz, Edge and Christian and the Dudley Boyz, the defending champions. Respective associates of each tag team, Spike Dudley for the Dudley Boyz, Rhyno for Edge and Christian, and Lita for the Hardy Boyz, interfered during the match. With Spike (who had just taken a chair shot to the head from Lita) and Rhyno (who had already been dispatched by Jeff Hardy) both laying on two tables outside the ring, Jeff Hardy set up a huge ladder beside them and performed a Swanton Bomb onto them through the tables with most of his body landing on Spike, taking him out of the match. Lita was taken out of the match when Bubba Ray and D-Von Dudley performed a 3-D on her. Jeff tried to unhook the belts but had the ladder beneath him pulled away by Bubba Ray, leaving him hanging in the air, and allowing Edge to jump off another ladder and spear Jeff to the ground at a height of 12 feet. Bubba Ray and Matt Hardy climbed the same ladder but Rhyno tipped the ladder over, sending Bubba Ray and Matt through four stacked tables at ringside and taking them out of the match. D-Von then set the ladder up again and attempted to grab the titles, but was held back by Edge. With Edge holding onto D-Von's legs, Christian sat on Rhyno's shoulders as he climbed up the ladder and unhooked the belts, making him and Edge the new Tag Team Champions. A total of 9 tables were destroyed in this match, and every performer involved except D-Von and Lita went through at least one table.

The ninth match was a gimmick battle royal, involving nineteen WWF alumni famous for their outlandish gimmicks. To further increase the nostalgia, former announcers "Mean Gene" Okerlund and Bobby "The Brain" Heenan handled commentary for the match. The Iron Sheik won the match by throwing Hillbilly Jim out of the ring. As revenge for being eliminated, Sgt. Slaughter reentered the ring and put him in the Cobra Clutch.

The penultimate match was between The Undertaker and Triple H. For his entrance, Triple H had heavy metal band Motörhead perform his theme song, "The Game", live. The match started with the two fighting outside of the ring, with Triple H quickly being put through the replacement Spanish announcers' table. Later on, referee Mike Chioda accidentally had Triple H catapulted into him, and was then attacked by The Undertaker due to his dissatisfaction over a two-count. With Chioda knocked out, the two brawled outside the ring, through the crowd, and into the technical area. On top of scaffolding, Triple H used a steel chair to attack The Undertaker's legs, but The Undertaker retaliated with a chokeslam off the scaffolding, followed by a diving elbow drop. Back in the ring, The Undertaker hit Triple H with a Tombstone piledriver and went for the pin, but Chioda was still unconscious. Later in the match, Triple H tried to pin The Undertaker after hitting him in the head with a sledgehammer while in the Last Ride position, but only gained a two-count. Triple H sent The Undertaker into the corner and stood on the second rope to hit him with more punches, but The Undertaker countered with a Last Ride, allowing him to pin Triple H and increase his WrestleMania winning streak to 9–0.

=== Main event ===
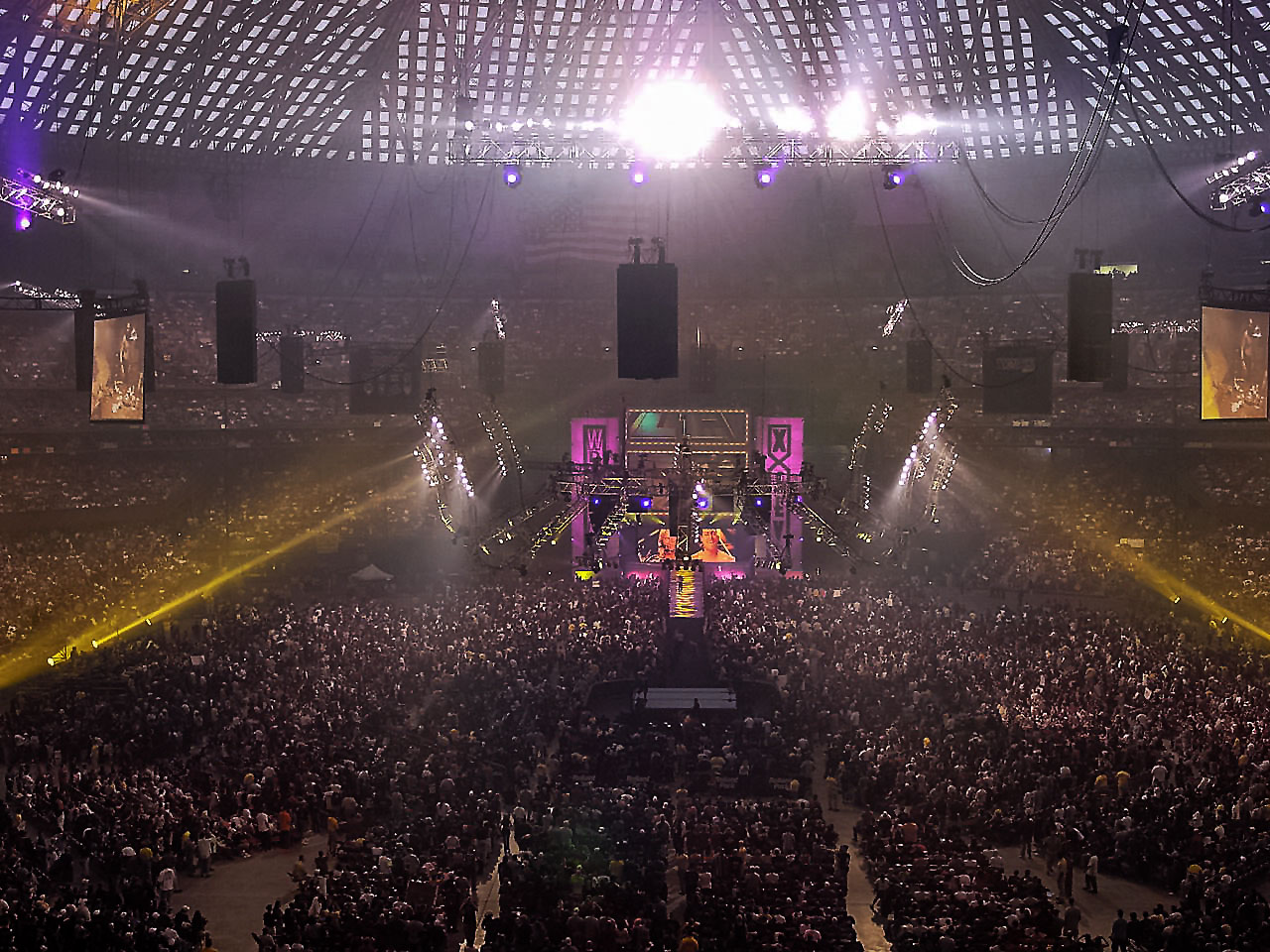
An attendance record-setting 67,925 fans at the Astrodome for WrestleMania X-Seven

The final contest of the night was the WWF Championship match between The Rock and "Stone Cold" Steve Austin, which had a surprise no disqualification stipulation added just before the superstars were introduced. During the match, the two brawled inside and outside of the ring, with both men bleeding after hitting each other with the ring bell. The Rock attempted to place Austin in a Sharpshooter hold, but Austin reversed it into a Sharpshooter of his own. After The Rock reached the ropes to force a break, Austin applied the Million Dollar Dream, a submission hold best known from his former gimmick, The Ringmaster. Shortly after, The Rock used Austin's own finishing maneuver on Austin by executing a Stunner. Vince McMahon then came to ringside to observe the match. When The Rock tried to pin Austin after the People's Elbow, McMahon seized The Rock's leg and pulled him off Austin, breaking the pin attempt. After chasing McMahon around the ring, Austin responded by using The Rock's signature move, the Rock Bottom. Later, The Rock executed a Rock Bottom for a near fall. After The Rock attacked McMahon, he was given a Stunner by Austin for a close near fall. After The Rock kicked out of the Stunner, McMahon handed Austin a steel chair to hit The Rock with at Austin's request, revealing to everyone that Austin had sided with McMahon, a man he once considered his nemesis. With this, Austin turned heel. Austin attacked The Rock with the steel chair, hitting him sixteen times, before pinning him and becoming the new WWF Champion. The show ended with Austin and McMahon shaking hands and sharing beers.

== Reception and legacy ==
The event was met with universal acclaim from fans and critics alike. John Powell of Canadian Online Explorer's professional wrestling section rated the event a perfect 10 out of 10 stars, with the main event between The Rock and "Stone Cold" Steve Austin in a No Disqualification Match for the WWF Championship rated 10 out of 10 stars. The Tables, Ladders, and Chairs match for the WWF Tag Team Championship between The Hardy Boyz, Edge and Christian, and The Dudley Boyz also received a perfect 10 out of 10 stars, the Street Fight between Mr. McMahon and Shane McMahon rated 7 out of 10 stars, the match between Triple H and The Undertaker rated 6 out of 10 stars and the match between Kurt Angle and Chris Benoit rated 8 out of 10 stars.

X-Seven was also awarded Best Major Show for 2001 by Dave Meltzer's Wrestling Observer Newsletter. The Tables, Ladders, and Chairs match for the WWF Tag Team Championship between The Hardy Boyz, Edge and Christian and The Dudley Boyz was also placed #5 on IGN's list of Top 20 Matches in WrestleMania History and noted that the match included "some of the most memorable bumps wrestling fans have ever witnessed." D-Von Dudley expressed his belief that the match should be inducted into the WWE Hall of Fame, stating: "In my opinion, I think that we should — you know, the n.W.o got inducted into the Hall of Fame and those guys were already in it. How about a TLC induction? How about recognizing how special that match was? Because think about it, not only was the match special, but they actually named a pay-per-view after it. So, you know, it has some relevance to it to be special, so why not put that match in the Hall of Fame?" Matt Hardy said it was his favorite career TLC match.

In 2013, WWE released a list of their "15 best pay-per-views ever", with WrestleMania X-Seven ranked at number one. In 2019, Troy L. Smith of cleveland.com released a list of the "50 greatest wrestling pay-per-views of all time" from every professional wrestling promotion in the world, with WrestleMania X-Seven again ranked at number one.

The promotional match preview video package for the main event, set to Limp Bizkit's "My Way", is widely considered one of the greatest wrestling video packages of all time.

== Aftermath ==
The following night on Raw, Austin and The Rock faced each other in a rematch held inside a steel cage. Late in the match, Triple H entered the cage and teased a fight with his long-time rival Austin before turning on The Rock. For several minutes, Austin, Triple H, and Vince McMahon triple-teamed the outnumbered Rock, officially forging an alliance with Triple H and Austin called The Two-Man Power Trip. The Rock was subsequently written out of the WWF's storylines with McMahon giving him a suspension. This allowed The Rock time off to begin filming The Scorpion King. The Rock returned on the July 30 edition of Raw and chose to fight for Team WWF over Team WCW/ECW. Three weeks later at SummerSlam, The Rock won his first WCW Championship by defeating Booker T. The Rock and Austin would face each other again at WrestleMania XIX in a rematch with The Rock winning.

Following The Rock's suspension, Triple H's feud with the Brothers of Destruction continued with Austin now by his side. On the April 5, 2001 edition of SmackDown!, Triple H challenged Intercontinental Champion Chris Jericho for his title. After interference from WWF Commissioner William Regal and his wife Stephanie McMahon-Helmsley, Triple H defeated Jericho to win his third Intercontinental Championship. The feud with Undertaker and Kane was temporarily put on hold after Triple H and Austin entered a brief rivalry with the Hardy Boyz, which resulted in Jeff Hardy beating Triple H for the Intercontinental Championship the following week on SmackDown!. Triple H promptly regained the title the next Monday on Raw.

Meanwhile, the Brothers of Destruction defeated Edge and Christian to become the new WWF Tag Team Champions on the April 19, 2001 episode of SmackDown! in a no-disqualification match. Austin and Triple H decided to challenge The Undertaker and Kane for their newly won titles, but due to some wrangling by Linda McMahon, the match between the teams signed for Backlash forced Austin and Triple H to put up their WWF and Intercontinental titles respectively against the tag team titles in a "winner-take-all" match. At Backlash, Triple H scored the pin after attacking Kane with his sledgehammer and the Two-Man Power Trip became the second team in WWF history to hold both major singles titles and the tag team titles at the same time. The feud ultimately came to a climax at Judgment Day when Austin defeated The Undertaker to retain the WWF Championship, while Kane defeated Triple H for the Intercontinental Championship. The next night on Raw, Austin and Triple H lost the tag team titles to Chris Jericho and Chris Benoit; during the course of the match, Triple H tore his quadriceps tendon and would miss the remainder of the year, leaving Austin to feud with the tag team champions alone. The feud culminated in a Triple Threat Match at King of the Ring, where Austin pinned Benoit to retain the WWF Championship. Ten years later in 2011, Undertaker and Triple H would once again renew their rivalry, going on to face each other in a rematch at WrestleMania XXVII with The Undertaker defeating HHH via submission, to extend his WrestleMania winning streak to 19–0. A year later, they faced each other a third time at WrestleMania XXVIII in a Hell in a Cell match with Shawn Michaels as the special guest referee. The Undertaker once again won the match to extend his WrestleMania winning streak to 20–0.

Due to the acquisition of WCW, Vince's feud with Shane would later spiral into The Invasion storyline that dominated the WWF in the latter half of the year. It consisted of WCW wrestlers "invading" the WWF's televised shows in an attempt to "take over" the WWF. Extreme Championship Wrestling (ECW) would also be involved, with Stephanie as its new owner, merging WCW and ECW into The Alliance. Despite giving her own demands for a divorce shortly after WrestleMania, Linda would eventually reconcile with Vince in the wake of the Alliance's greater threat to the WWF.

Shane McMahon's next feud would involve Kurt Angle, as he would crash Angle's Olympic Gold Medal Ceremony reenactment on the May 21 edition of Raw. Angle was celebrating the return of his gold medal from Chris Benoit, which he won back the previous night at Judgment Day. Shane interrupted the ceremony and mocked Angle, while declaring the return of WCW. This led an enraged Angle to deliver an Angle Slam to Shane. Shane would return the favor on the June 11 edition of Raw with an assist from The Undertaker. The two would eventually meet in a streetfight at King of the Ring, which was the third of three matches for Kurt Angle on the night.

The other two matches were the Semifinals and Final of the King of the Ring tournament, in which Angle was the defending champion. He would lose to Edge in the finals of the tournament, thanks to interference from Shane. Following Edge's King of the Ring win, this led to Christian becoming increasingly jealous of Edge's success. The two would break up on the September 3, 2001 edition of Raw following Christian's loss to The Rock in a WCW title match. After a brief feud for the WWF Intercontinental Championship, both men would go on to become successful singles wrestlers in their own right with Edge being best known as the "Rated R Superstar."

This would be the only WrestleMania for Paul Heyman as a commentator. And notably, in 2020, Tommy Dreamer (who worked for Paul Heyman in ECW) claimed that he contemplated murdering Heyman and then killing himself at the event due to Heyman's financial mistreatment of Dreamer and other ECW wrestlers, but changed his mind after receiving a phone call from Jim Ross.

== Results ==
No.	Results	Stipulations	Times
1^{H}	X-Factor (X-Pac and Justin Credible) (with Albert) defeated Steve Blackman and Grand Master Sexay	Tag team match	2:46
2	Chris Jericho (c) defeated William Regal	Singles match for the WWF Intercontinental Championship	7:40
3	Tazz and The APA (Bradshaw and Faarooq) (with Jacqueline) defeated Right to Censor (The Goodfather, Val Venis and Bull Buchanan) (with Steven Richards)	Six-man tag team match	3:56
4	Kane defeated Raven (c) and Big Show	Triple threat Hardcore match for the WWF Hardcore Championship	9:28
5	Eddie Guerrero (with Perry Saturn) defeated Test (c)	Singles match for the WWF European Championship	8:32
6	Kurt Angle defeated Chris Benoit	Singles match	14:10
7	Chyna defeated Ivory (c)	Singles match for the WWF Women's Championship	2:38
8	Shane McMahon (with Linda McMahon) defeated Mr. McMahon (with Stephanie McMahon and Trish Stratus)	Street Fight with Mick Foley as special guest referee	14:11
9	Edge and Christian defeated The Dudley Boyz (Bubba Ray Dudley and D-Von Dudley) (c) and The Hardy Boyz (Matt Hardy and Jeff Hardy)	Tables, Ladders, and Chairs match for the WWF Tag Team Championship	15:50
10	The Iron Sheik won by last eliminating Hillbilly Jim (Note: The other participants were: The Bushwhackers (Luke and Butch), Duke Droese, Doink the Clown, Nikolai Volkoff, Tugboat, The Goon, Earthquake, Gobbledy Gooker, Brother Love, Michael Hayes, One Man Gang, Kamala (accompanied by Harvey Wippleman), Kim Chee, Jim Cornette, Repo Man, and Sgt. Slaughter.)	Gimmick Battle Royal	3:50
11	The Undertaker defeated Triple H	Singles match	18:27
12	"Stone Cold" Steve Austin defeated The Rock (c)	No Disqualification match for the WWF Championship	28:08
(c) / – the champion(s) heading into the match; H / – the match was broadcast prior to the pay-per-view on Sunday Night Heat
