= WWF Backlash (2001) =

World Wrestling Federation pay-per-view event

Backlash
- Promotional poster featuring Triple H and his signature sledgehammer.
- Promotion: World Wrestling Federation
- Date: April 29, 2001
- City: Rosemont, Illinois
- Venue: Allstate Arena
- Attendance: 15,592
- Buy rate: 375,000

Pay-per-view chronology
← Previous; WrestleMania X-Seven	Next → Insurrextion

Backlash chronology
← Previous; 2000	Next → 2002

The 2001 Backlash was a professional wrestling pay-per-view (PPV) event produced by the World Wrestling Federation (WWF, now WWE). It was the third annual Backlash and took place on April 29, 2001, at the Allstate Arena in the Chicago suburb of Rosemont, Illinois. The concept of the event was based around the backlash from WrestleMania X-Seven. This was the last Backlash held before the introduction of the brand extension in March 2002.

Seven professional wrestling matches were scheduled on the event's card. The main event was a "winner take all" tag team match in which the WWF Champion "Stone Cold" Steve Austin teamed with his Power Trip ally, Intercontinental Champion Triple H, to take on the WWF Tag Team Champions, The Brothers of Destruction (The Undertaker and Kane). The stipulations were that if Austin and Triple H won, they would become the new tag team champions. If The Undertaker and Kane won, the WWF and Intercontinental Championships would be awarded to them based on who scored the winning fall. The Power Trip won the match after Triple H hit Kane with a sledgehammer, thus gaining the tag team championship and retaining their own respective titles.

Featured matches on the undercard included a Last Man Standing match between Shane McMahon and The Big Show, which McMahon won, and an Ultimate Submission match featuring Chris Benoit and Kurt Angle, which Benoit won.

== Production ==
=== Background ===
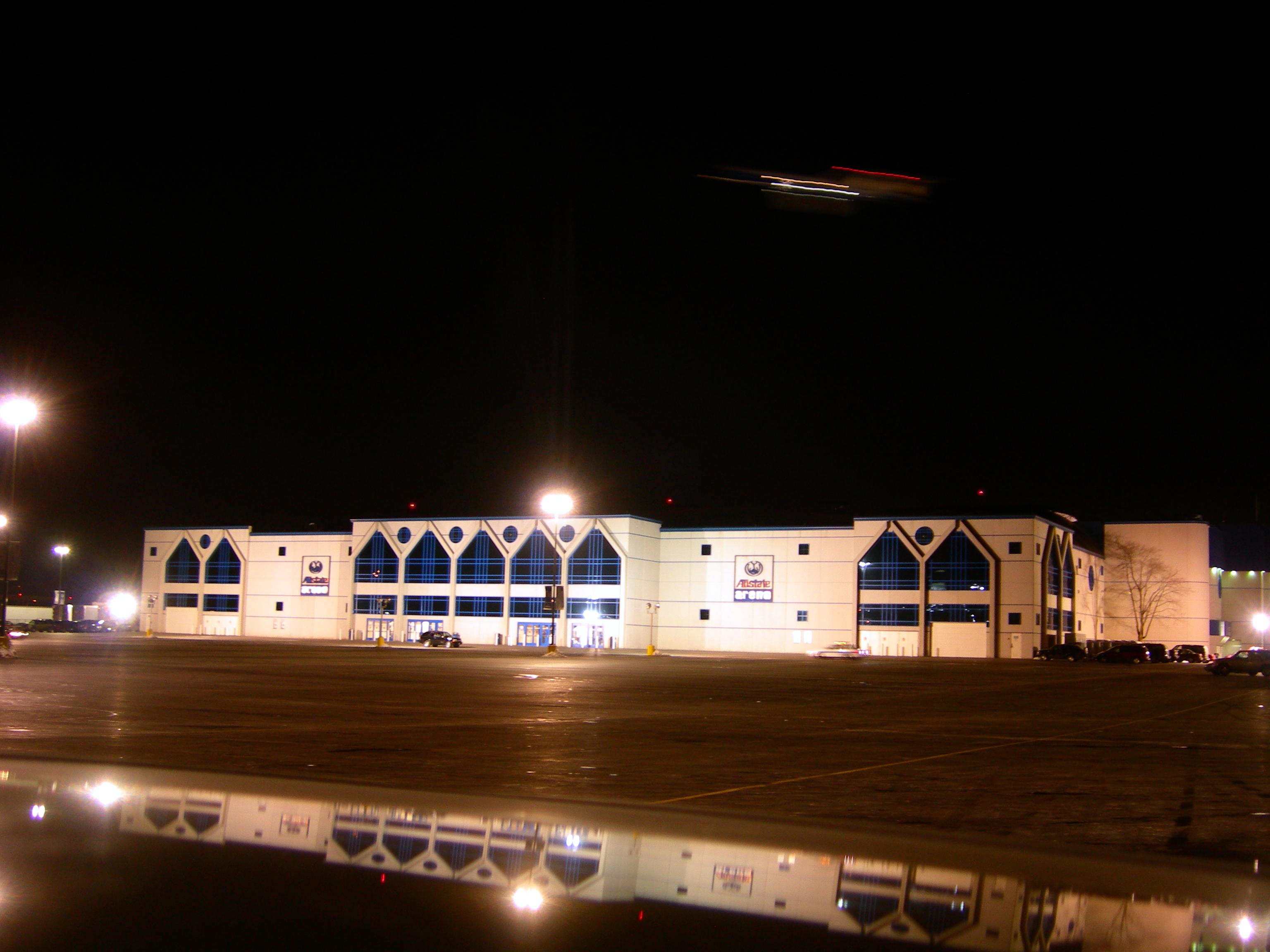
The event was held at the Allstate Arena in the Chicago suburb of Rosemont, Illinois.

Backlash is a professional wrestling pay-per-view (PPV) event that was established by the World Wrestling Federation (WWF, now WWE) in 1999. The concept is based around the backlash from WWF's flagship event, WrestleMania. The third event featured the backlash from WrestleMania X-Seven, and it was scheduled to take place on April 29, 2001, at the Allstate Arena in the Chicago suburb of Rosemont, Illinois.

=== Storylines ===
The event featured seven professional wrestling matches that involved different wrestlers from pre-existing scripted feuds and storylines. Wrestlers were portrayed as either villains or fan favorites as they followed a series of events which built tension, culminating in a wrestling match or series of matches.

At WrestleMania X-Seven, "Stone Cold" Steve Austin fought The Rock for the WWF Championship. During the match, Vince McMahon interfered, which eventually led to Austin attacking The Rock with a steel chair to win the WWF Championship and in the process align himself with his long-time enemy. The next night on Raw is War, a rematch between the pair took place in a Steel Cage match. Triple H interfered in the match, attacking The Rock and partnering up with Austin and McMahon. Briefly known as The McMahon Alliance, the pair began being referred to as "The Two Man Power Trip" (or "The Power Trip" for short). On the episode of SmackDown! following WrestleMania, Austin assaulted his long-time friend Jim Ross after Ross criticized his alliance with Triple H and McMahon. Triple H then defeated Chris Jericho to win the Intercontinental Championship for a third time in the main event, bringing both of the major singles titles in the company to the new alliance.

Shortly after this happened, The Brothers of Destruction (Kane and The Undertaker) began feuding with Austin and Triple H (in between, Triple H traded the Intercontinental Championship back and forth with Jeff Hardy for a brief period). A match between the two teams was signed for Backlash. The Undertaker and Kane were not simply satisfied with that, and they demanded and were given a title shot at the reigning WWF Tag Team Champions, Edge and Christian, on the April 19, 2001 edition of SmackDown!. The brothers won the match, but were attacked by the Power Trip afterwards.

On the next Raw is War, McMahon told Austin and Triple H that the match at Backlash, which was now to be contested for the Tag Team Championship, had an additional stipulation added to it. At the time, he and his wife Linda were going through (kayfabe) problems in their marriage and Linda, who McMahon had demanded a divorce from in December 2000, was seeking a divorce that he refused to give her. Since Linda was still the (on-screen) CEO of the company, this gave her power to veto her husband's decisions and force compromises.

McMahon told the Power Trip that Linda had forced him to include one other caveat in the match. Austin and Triple H would indeed get their championship opportunity at Backlash, but in order to do so they would be required to place their singles titles at stake as well. The winning team would receive control of all three championships. If Austin and Triple H were to win, they would become Tag Team Champions in addition to their status as the WWF and Intercontinental Champions. If The Undertaker and Kane were to win, they would receive both singles titles. Whoever scored the fall would receive the title of the wrestler they defeated, with the other receiving the other title; this meant if Austin took the fall, he would lose his WWF Championship to whoever pinned him or made him submit and Triple H would have to forfeit his Intercontinental Championship to whoever did not score the victory for the Brothers of Destruction.

== Event ==
Other on-screen personnel
Role:	Name:
English commentators	Jim Ross
English commentators	Paul Heyman
Spanish commentators	Carlos Cabrera
Spanish commentators	Hugo Savinovich
Backstage interviewers	Michael Cole
Backstage interviewers	Lilian Garcia
Backstage interviewers	Kevin Kelly
Ring announcers	Howard Finkel
Referees	Mike Chioda
Referees	Jim Korderas
Referees	Earl Hebner
Referees	Jack Doan
Referees	Tim White
Referees	Theodore Long
Referees	Chad Patton

Before the event began, a dark match took place on Heat in which Crash Holly defended the WWF Light Heavyweight Championship against Jerry Lynn. Lynn pinned Holly with a Roll Up whilst holding Holly's tights to win the title.

In another dark match, Lita faced Molly Holly. Lita performed a Litasault on Molly to win the match.

=== Preliminary matches ===
The event opened with X-Factor (X-Pac, Justin Credible and Albert) facing The Dudley Boyz (Bubba Ray Dudley, D-Von Dudley and Spike Dudley). X-Pac and Credible performed a double Superkick on Bubba to win the match.

Next, Rhyno defended the WWF Hardcore Championship against Raven in a Hardcore match. Rhyno performed a Gore on Raven to retain the title.

After that, WWF commissioner William Regal faced Chris Jericho in a Duchess of Queensbury Rules match overseen by "the Duchess of Queensbury," a stereotypical 18th/19th century female British aristocrat in period costume. Jericho attempted a Lionsault on Regal but the Duchess announced the first round had expired, allowing Regal to pin Jericho with a roll up for a near-fall. Jericho forced Regal to submit to the Walls of Jericho but the Duchess announced submissions did not count. Jericho applied the Walls of Jericho on the Duchess, allowing Regal to hit Jericho with a steel chair to win the match.

In the fourth match, Kurt Angle faced Chris Benoit in a 30-minute Ultimate Submission match, a variation of an Iron Man match. Angle forced Benoit to submit to a Leglock to make the score 1–0. Benoit forced Angle to submit to a Cross Armbreaker to make the score 1–1. Angle forced Benoit to submit to the Ankle lock to make the score 2–1. Angle forced Benoit to submit to the Crippler Crossface to make the score 3–1. Benoit forced Angle to submit to a Single Leg Boston Crab with his knee on Angle's neck to make the score 3–2. Benoit forced Angle to submit to the Ankle Lock to make the score 3–3. The time limit expired, leading to the referee continuing the match in overtime. Benoit forced Angle to submit to the Crippler Crossface to win the match 4–3.

Next, Shane McMahon faced Big Show in a Last Man Standing match. Test interfered, performing a Big Boot on Big Show. Shane climbed the stage structure, allowing Test to attack Big Show in the staging area. Shane performed a Leap of Faith off the Titantron onto Big Show, who was lay in the staging area. Test used a Camera to help Shane stand but Big Show could not stand by a ten count, meaning Shane won the match.

After that, Matt Hardy defended the WWF European Championship against Christian and Eddie Guerrero. Edge interfered, performing a Spear on Hardy. Jeff Hardy interfered, attacking Edge. Christian performed an Unprettier on Guerrero but Jeff broke up the pin with a Swanton Bomb. Hardy performed a Twist of Fate on Christian to retain the title.

=== Main event ===
In the main event, The Two-Man Power Trip ("Stone Cold" Steve Austin and Triple H) faced The Brothers of Destruction (Kane and The Undertaker) in a tag team match for The Brothers of Destruction's WWF Tag Team Championship, Triple H's WWF Intercontinental Championship and Austin's WWF Championship. Triple H performed a Pedigree on Kane and Austin pinned Kane but The Undertaker broke up the pinfall. Kane performed an Enzuigiri on Austin, causing Austin to collide with the referee. The Undertaker performed a Last Ride on Triple H but the referee did not see the tag, voiding the pinfall. Stephanie McMahon interfered, leading to Kane performing a Big Boot on McMahon. Vince McMahon interfered, handing Triple H his sledgehammer. Triple H hit Kane with the sledgehammer to win the match, retain the WWF Intercontinental Championship and Austin's WWF Championship, and win the WWF Tag Team Championship.

== Aftermath ==
The feud between The Two Man Power Trip and The Brothers of Destruction continued. The next night on Raw is War, Austin and Triple H broke Kane's arm in storyline. It was then announced Kane would face Triple H in a Chain match for the Intercontinental Championship and The Undertaker would face Austin for the WWF Championship at Judgment Day. At Judgment Day, Austin accidentally hit Triple H with a steel chair during his chain match with Kane, causing Triple H to lose his Intercontinental Championship. Triple H did not return the favor, however; instead, he helped Austin retain his title against The Undertaker. The next night on Raw, the Two-Man Power Trip faced Chris Benoit and Chris Jericho with the tag title on the line. In this match, Triple H suffered a legitimate and career-threatening injury when he misstepped, causing him to suffer a tear in his left quadriceps. Despite his inability to place any weight on his leg, Triple H was able to complete the match. Near the end of the match, Jericho tried to pin Austin, but Triple H got in the ring and tried to hit Jericho with the sledgehammer. Jericho avoided the blow and the sledgehammer instead hit Austin, a situation Jericho and Benoit took advantage of to win the match and the titles.

The 2001 Backlash would be the final Backlash event to occur before the introduction of the brand extension the following year in March, where the promotion split its roster between the Raw and SmackDown! brands where the wrestlers were exclusively assigned to perform. The 2002 event in turn featured wrestlers from both brands.

== Results ==
No.	Results	Stipulations	Times
1^{H}	Jerry Lynn defeated Crash Holly (c)	Singles match for the WWF Light Heavyweight Championship	3:37
2^{H}	Lita defeated Molly Holly	Singles match	2:40
3	X-Factor (Albert, Justin Credible and X-Pac) defeated The Dudley Boyz (Bubba Ray Dudley, D-Von Dudley and Spike Dudley)	Six-man tag team match	8:00
4	Rhyno (c) defeated Raven	Hardcore match for the WWF Hardcore Championship	8:11
5	William Regal defeated Chris Jericho	Duchess of Queensbury Rules match	12:34
6	Chris Benoit defeated Kurt Angle 4–3 in sudden death overtime	30-minute Ultimate Submission match	31:33
7	Shane McMahon defeated Big Show	Last Man Standing match	11:55
8	Matt Hardy (c) defeated Christian and Eddie Guerrero	Triple threat match for the WWF European Championship	6:37
9	The Two-Man Power Trip ("Stone Cold" Steve Austin, WWF, and Triple H, Intercontinental) (with Stephanie McMahon-Helmsley) defeated The Brothers of Destruction (Kane and The Undertaker) (Tag Team)	Winners Take All Tag team match for the WWF Championship, WWF Intercontinental Championship, and WWF Tag Team Championship	25:02
(c) / – the champion(s) heading into the match; H / – the match was broadcast prior to the pay-per-view on Sunday Night Heat

=== Ultimate Submission match ===
Score		Point winner	Notes	Time
Benoit	Angle	Point winner	Notes	Time
0	1	Kurt Angle	Angle submitted Benoit to a kneebar	7:06
1	1	Chris Benoit	Benoit submitted Angle to a cross armbreaker	8:05
1	2	Kurt Angle	Angle submitted Benoit to the Ankle Lock	10:22
1	3	Kurt Angle	Angle submitted Benoit to the Crippler Crossface	11:42
2	3	Chris Benoit	Benoit submitted Angle to a single leg Boston crab	18:05
3	3	Chris Benoit	Benoit submitted Angle to the Ankle Lock	27:53
4	3	Chris Benoit	Benoit submitted Angle to the Crippler Crossface	31:33
