= Royal Rumble (2001) =

World Wrestling Federation pay-per-view event

- Promotional poster by Mark Romanowski, featuring various WWF wrestlers
- Promotion: World Wrestling Federation
- Date: January 21, 2001
- City: New Orleans, Louisiana
- Venue: New Orleans Arena
- Attendance: 17,137
- Buy rate: 625,000
- Tagline: 30 men. Every man for himself. One victor.

Pay-per-view chronology
← Previous; Armageddon	Next → No Way Out

Royal Rumble chronology
← Previous; 2000	Next → 2002

The 2001 Royal Rumble was a professional wrestling pay-per-view (PPV) event produced by the World Wrestling Federation (WWF, now WWE). It was the 14th annual Royal Rumble event and took place on January 21, 2001, at the New Orleans Arena in New Orleans, Louisiana. The event was based around the men's Royal Rumble match, a modified 30-man battle royal in which the participants enter at timed intervals instead of all beginning in the ring at the same time and the winner received a WWF Championship match at WrestleMania X-Seven.

Six matches were contested, including one match for the Sunday Night Heat pre-show. The main event was the 2001 Royal Rumble match, which "Stone Cold" Steve Austin won by last eliminating Kane, which was his record-setting third Rumble win, after his back-to-back wins in 1997 and 1998. The match also included comedian Drew Carey as a participant. On the undercard, Kurt Angle retained the WWF Championship against Triple H, and Chris Jericho defeated Chris Benoit in a ladder match to win the WWF Intercontinental Championship. The event was notable for the WWF return of Haku, who wrestled in World Championship Wrestling (WCW) as Meng, holding the WCW Hardcore Championship after winning it at WCW Sin one week before.

== Production ==
=== Background ===
The 14th annual Royal Rumble event was held at the New Orleans Arena in New Orleans, Louisiana.

The Royal Rumble is an annual professional wrestling event, produced every January by the World Wrestling Federation (WWF, now WWE) since 1988; that first event was a television special before it became an annual pay-per-view (PPV) beginning in 1989. It is one of the promotion's original four pay-per-views, along with WrestleMania, SummerSlam, and Survivor Series, referred to as the "Big Four", and was considered one of the "Big Five" PPVs with the addition of King of the Ring in 1993. It is named after and centered on the men's Royal Rumble match. The 14th Royal Rumble event was scheduled to be held on January 21, 2001, at the New Orleans Arena in New Orleans, Louisiana.

The Royal Rumble match is a modified battle royal in which the participants enter at timed intervals instead of all beginning in the ring at the same time, and the match generally features 30 wrestlers. Since 1993, the winner earns a world championship match at that year's WrestleMania. For 2001, the winner earned a match for the WWF Championship at WrestleMania X-Seven.

=== Storylines ===
The event consisted of five matches that resulted from scripted storylines. Results were predetermined by WWF's writers, while storylines were produced on WWF's weekly television shows, Raw and SmackDown!.

At the Royal Rumble was WWF Champion Kurt Angle defending his title against Triple H in a standard match. The build-up to the match began on the January 8 episode of Raw Is War, when Angle defended the championship against "Stone Cold" Steve Austin, which ended in a no contest when Triple H interfered and ambushed Austin with a steel pipe. On the January 11 episode of SmackDown!, Vince McMahon scheduled Angle to defend his title at the Royal Rumble against Triple H. Leading up to the event, both men spoke about the match, with Triple H claiming that Angle only held the championship because he allowed him to, and Angle denying this.

Also taking place at the event was a ladder match for the Intercontinental Championship, in which the champion, Chris Benoit, defended his title against Chris Jericho. In the match, the title belt was suspended above the ring from the ceiling, and the only method to win was to climb a ladder to retrieve the belt. Their feud started at WrestleMania 2000, when Chris Benoit and Chris Jericho challenged Kurt Angle with both his Intercontinental title and WWF European Championship on the line in a Two-fall triple threat match. During that match, both men pinned each other in one fall each to win the respective championship from Angle. Since that event, Benoit would hold three pay per view victories over Jericho culminating at SummerSlam in a two out of three falls match. On the January 4 episode of SmackDown!, Benoit defended his title against Jericho in a standard match. During the match, Perry Saturn and Dean Malenko, Benoit's partners in the group The Radicalz, interfered by attacking Jericho, causing him to win the match by disqualification but not the championship. On the January 8 episode of Raw Is War, Jericho teamed with The Hardy Boyz (Matt Hardy and Jeff Hardy) against The Radicalz (Saturn, Malenko, and Benoit) in a six man tag team match, which Jericho won by pinning Benoit. On the January 11 episode of SmackDown!, Jericho demanded a title match at the Royal Rumble. Benoit offered to give Jericho any type of match he wanted and Jericho chose a ladder match.

== Event ==
Other on-screen personnel
Role:	Name:
Commentators	Jim Ross
Commentators	Jerry Lawler
Interviewers	Kevin Kelly
Interviewers	Michael Cole
Interviewers	Tazz
Ring announcer	Howard Finkel
Referees	Mike Chioda
Referees	Tim White
Referees	Jim Korderas
Referees	Jack Doan
Referees	Earl Hebner
Referees	Chad Patton

Before the pay-per-view event began, an episode of Sunday Night Heat, one of the secondary television programs for WWF, was shown. Lo Down (D'Lo Brown and Chaz) defeated Kaientai (Taka Michinoku and Shoichi Funaki) in a tag team match, when Chaz pinned Funaki. Originally, the winning team was to send one of their members into the Royal Rumble match, but Drew Carey wound up being entered instead.

=== Preliminary matches ===
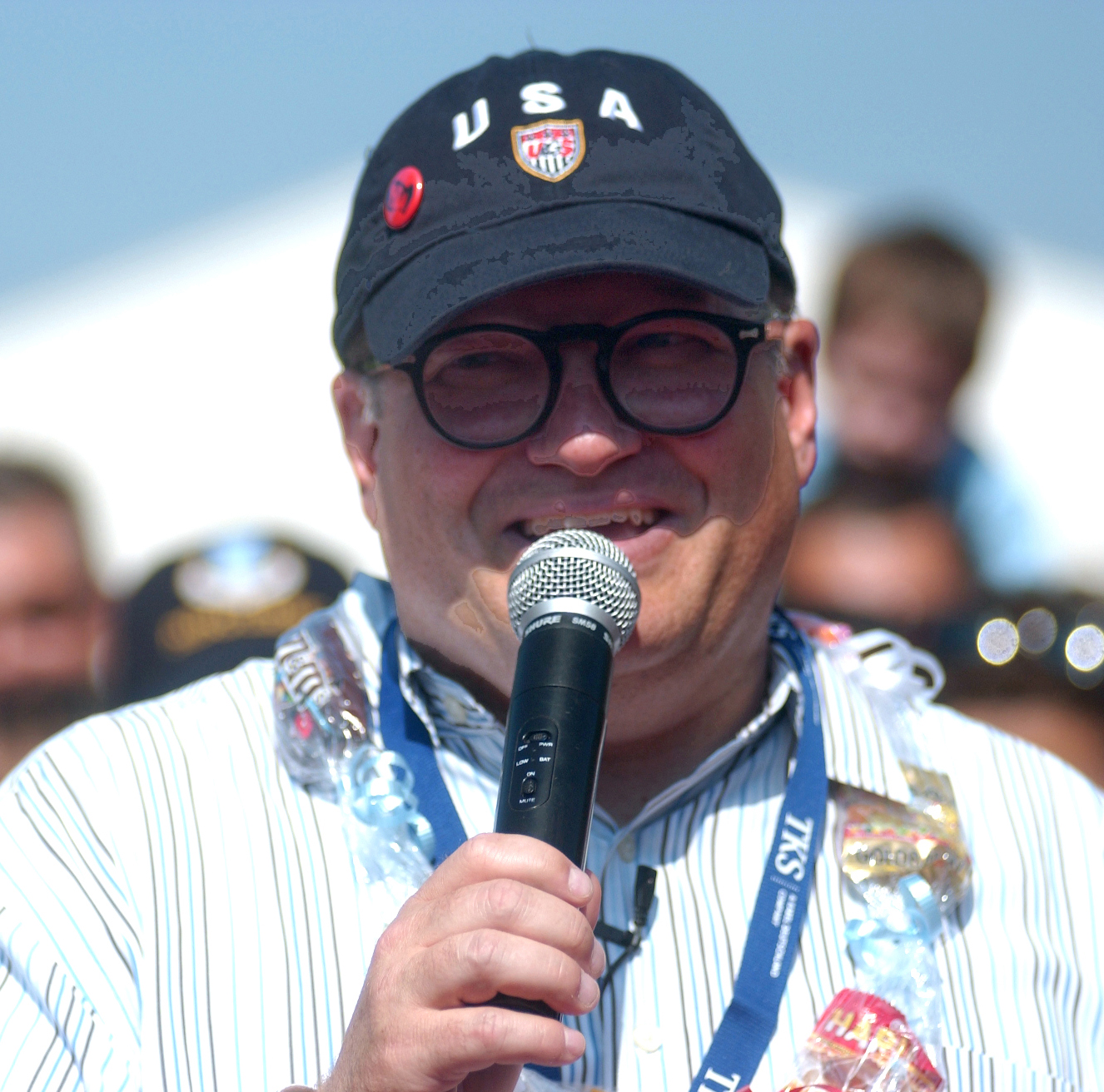
Actor and game show host Drew Carey entered himself in the Royal Rumble match

The pay-per-view event began with Edge & Christian defending their WWF Tag Team Championship against The Dudley Boyz (Bubba Ray Dudley and D-Von Dudley). Throughout the match, both teams performed many offensive maneuvers, though The Dudley Boyz were able to gain the upper hand. D-Von pinned Edge after a 3D, resulting in The Dudley Boyz winning the WWF Tag Team Championship.

Next, Chris Benoit defended his WWF Intercontinental Championship against Chris Jericho in a ladder match, which was to serve as the blowoff to their longstanding on-and-off rivalry. Both men performed a number of attacks and maneuvers on one another in an attempt to disable their opponent long enough to climb the ladder and retrieve the title belt suspended above the ring. At one point in the match, Benoit dove through the ropes headfirst at Jericho, but Jericho struck him in the face with a steel chair. Jericho also applied the Walls of Jericho at the top of the ladder onto Benoit. The end of the match came when Jericho pushed over the ladder while Benoit was ascending it, causing Benoit to fall out to the outside of the ring. Jericho then climbed the ladder and retrieved the Intercontinental Championship belt.

In the third contest, Ivory defended the WWF Women's Championship against Chyna. Both women attempted to gain an advantage over the other, with Chyna controlling much of the match. The end of the match came when Chyna attempted a handspring back elbow on Ivory, who was in the corner of the ring. Chyna, however, fell to the canvas and (in storyline) injured her neck. Ivory then covered her for a successful pinfall, retaining her championship. Following this, commentator Jerry Lawler went into the ring to check on Chyna, and she was removed from the ringside area on a stretcher.

=== Main event matches ===
Next, WWF Champion Kurt Angle defended the title against Triple H, who had been named number-one contender by his (then storyline) father-in-law Vince McMahon. The match began as a mat based, hold for hold contest, but Trish Stratus then tried to interfere on Angle's behalf, only to then get into a catfight with Stephanie McMahon, who was in Triple H's corner. Stratus (Vince McMahon's storyline mistress) and Stephanie (McMahon's daughter and then storyline wife of Triple H) had been involved in their own feud due to vying for power as the WWF's "dominant female". After the fracas involving the two ladies on the outside (which had to be broken up by Vince himself), both Triple H and Angle accidentally hit the referee Earl Hebner, causing him to roll out of the ring. Triple H grabbed the title belt and tried to hit Angle with it, only to receive a belly-to-belly suplex. Angle then tried to hit Triple H with the belt, but Triple H ducked and gave him a Pedigree. As Triple H went outside to revive the referee, "Stone Cold" Steve Austin attacked Triple H and performed the Stone Cold Stunner on him as retaliation for Triple H costing Austin the title several weeks earlier on Raw Is War. As Austin left the arena, Angle crawled over on top of Triple H to cover him for the pin, while Hebner recovered and made the count. Angle won the match and retained the WWF Championship, with a very angry Triple H vowing to get even with Austin for costing him the match.

Closing the show was the traditional 30-man Royal Rumble match for a WWF Championship match at WrestleMania X-Seven. The first two entrants were Jeff Hardy and Bull Buchanan, a member of Right to Censor at the time. They were joined by Matt Hardy who entered at No. 3, both Hardy Boyz worked together in eliminating Buchanan as well as Faarooq who entered at No. 4. Jeff and Matt then battled each other, and it was during this time that Drew Carey arrived at No. 5, being the first celebrity entrant in Royal Rumble history.

Earlier in the night, Carey was backstage looking to speak with Vince McMahon about how to put together a successful pay-per-view. After thinking Carey was trying to hit on his (storyline) mistress Trish Stratus, McMahon offered Carey a spot in the Royal Rumble match (in hopes of Carey getting pummeled) as a way to promote his upcoming "Improv All-Stars" pay per view. Once Carey entered the ring, he stood aside, and watched as the Hardy Boyz eliminated each other. Kane then entered at No. 6. Carey tried to shake his hand as well as bribe him with cash, but Kane grabbed Carey by the throat and was about to chokeslam him when Raven entered the ring at No. 7, and attacked Kane with a Singapore cane. This gave Carey the opportunity to eliminate himself safely by climbing over the top rope (this appearance would 10 years later lead to Carey being inducted in the "celebrity wing" of the WWE Hall of Fame).

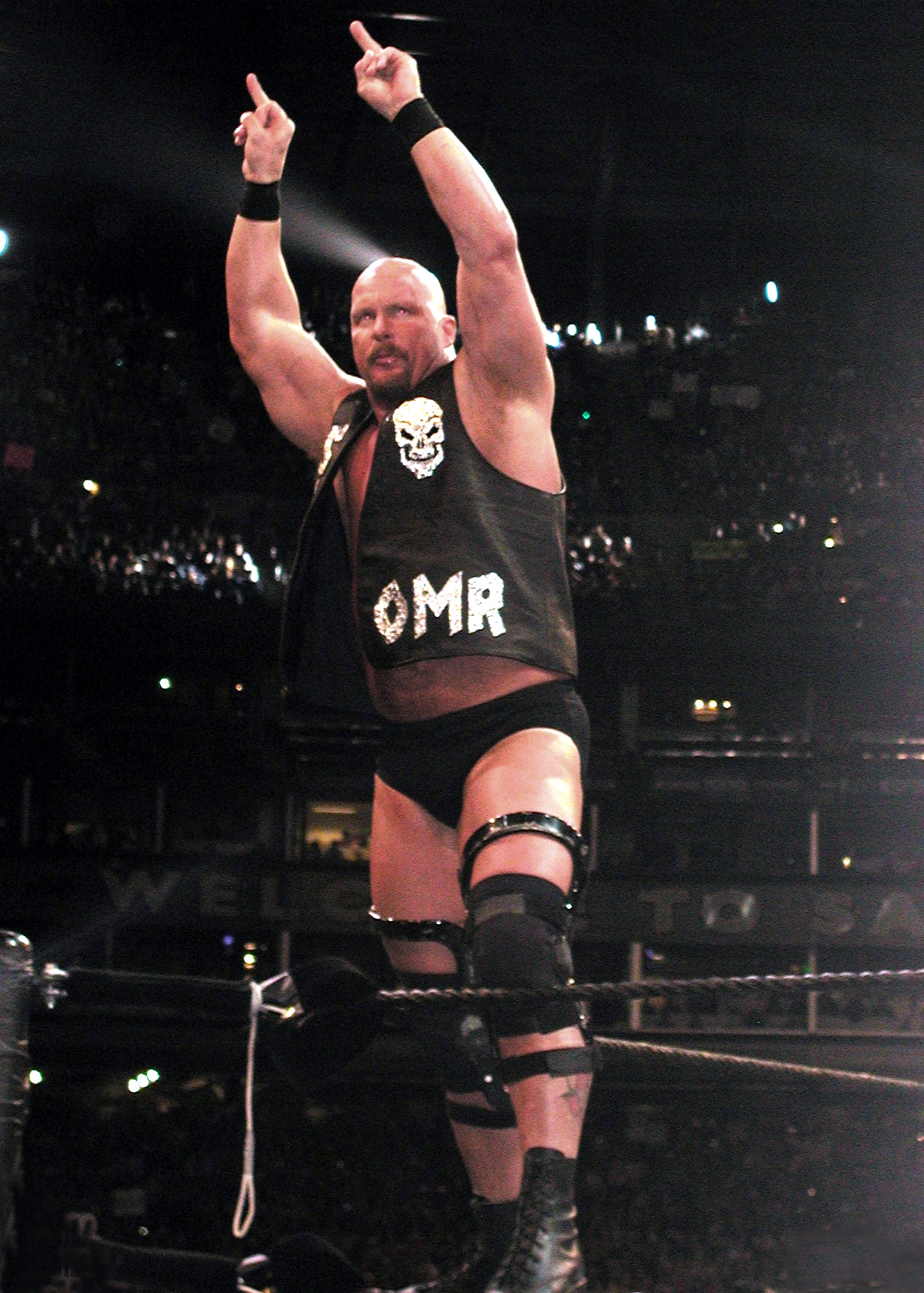
"Stone Cold" Steve Austin won the 2001 Royal Rumble match, which was his record-setting third Rumble win, after his back-to-back wins in 1997 and 1998.

No. 8, Al Snow came out before the clock went off and attacked Raven. He tried to get in the ring, but the referees stopped him until the buzzer went off. Kane would then dominate the match, eliminating all of the wrestlers who came between No. 7 to 11. The Honky Tonk Man (who had not appeared in the WWF since the 1998 Royal Rumble) came in at No. 12 and started singing his entrance theme "Cool, Cocky, Bad", only to be greeted by a guitar shot to the head by Kane and eliminated immediately after. The Rock entered at No. 13 and started brawling with Kane. The ring began to fill up in the next few minutes, and the tide turned when Big Show made his return from months of inactivity, entering at No. 23. He eliminated Test and K-Kwik, then proceeded to chokeslam everyone else. When he got to The Rock, Big Show received a low blow and was clotheslined over the top rope by The Rock. As Crash Holly made his way to the ring at No. 24, an irate Big Show dragged The Rock under the bottom rope and chokeslammed him through the broadcast table. Just when the other wrestlers worked together in trying to eliminate Kane, The Undertaker made his arrival at No. 25 and saved Kane, and both of them eliminated everyone in the ring except The Rock (who was still unconscious due to Big Show's assault on him). Scotty 2 Hotty entered the ring at No. 26 and was quickly beaten up and eliminated by both Kane and The Undertaker. "Stone Cold" Steve Austin entered at No. 27, but before he could enter the ring, he was assaulted and bloodied by Triple H who retaliated against Austin for costing him the match with Kurt Angle earlier. The Rock rolled back into the ring and battled with both The Undertaker and Kane. Billy Gunn, Haku (who was a surprise entrant after making his return from WCW) and Rikishi made up the last 3 entrants. Austin would actually be the last wrestler to enter the ring as he had just recovered and was coming to the ring at the same time as Rikishi, the 30th entrant.

Once everybody had entered the ring, Austin eliminated Haku, and Rikishi superkicked The Undertaker, eliminating him. Rikishi then attempted a Banzai Drop on The Rock, but The Rock recovered quickly, giving Rikishi a low blow and causing him to fall over the top rope.

The final four consisted of Kane, The Rock, Austin, and Gunn. Gunn executed the Fame Asser on Austin, but Austin recovered quickly and eliminated Gunn. The Rock and Austin then battled each other after tossing Kane through (but not over) the ropes. Kane came back in moments later and tried to eliminate both The Rock and Austin, who were fighting near the ropes. The Rock was eliminated, while Austin held on to the ropes. After a minute or so of fighting Austin, Kane went outside the ring, grabbed a steel chair and tried to use it to hit Austin. Austin avoided the chair shot and executed a Stunner on Kane. As Kane got up, Austin hit him in the head three times with the chair and then clotheslined him over the top rope to win the Rumble for a record-setting third time, after his back-to-back wins in 1997 and 1998.

== Reception ==
In 2017, Kevin Pantoja of 411Mania gave the event a rating of 9.5 [Amazing], writing, "The best Royal Rumble Pay-Per-View in history and one of the best PPVs in history period. The only thing on the show that keeps it from the perfect score was the garbage Women’s Title stuff. Everything else more than delivered. The WWF Title and WWF Tag Team Title matches were both really good and worked very well. The Royal Rumble match itself is one of the best Rumbles of all-time. Jericho vs. Benoit steals the show though. It is the best singles ladder match I've ever seen. This is just a tremendous event".

== Aftermath ==
Before his title match at WrestleMania X-Seven, "Stone Cold" Steve Austin would try to get revenge on Triple H for attacking him at the pay per view. The two would face off in a Three Stages of Hell match at No Way Out which Triple H won. Also, Stephanie McMahon would face Trish Stratus and The Rock would defeat Kurt Angle for the WWF Championship. The Rock and Austin would face at WrestleMania. Austin would win the match with help from his arch-nemesis Mr. McMahon and begin a heel turn.

== Results ==
No.	Results	Stipulations	Times
1^{H}	Lo Down (Chaz and D'Lo Brown) (with Tiger Ali Singh) defeated Kaientai (Funaki and Taka Michinoku) by pinfall	Tag team match	1:57
2	Dudley Boyz (Bubba Ray Dudley and D-Von Dudley) defeated Edge & Christian (c) by pinfall	Tag team match for the WWF Tag Team Championship	9:58
3	Chris Jericho defeated Chris Benoit (c)	Ladder match for the WWF Intercontinental Championship	18:43
4	Ivory (c) (with Steven Richards) defeated Chyna by pinfall	Singles match for the WWF Women's Championship	3:27
5	Kurt Angle (c) (with Trish Stratus) defeated Triple H (with Stephanie McMahon-Helmsley) by pinfall	Singles match for the WWF Championship	24:18
6	Stone Cold Steve Austin won by last eliminating Kane	30-man Royal Rumble match for a WWF Championship match at WrestleMania X-Seven	1:01:52
(c) / – the champion(s) heading into the match; H / – the match was broadcast prior to the pay-per-view on Sunday Night Heat

=== Royal Rumble entrances and eliminations ===
A new entrant came out approximately every 2 minutes.

– Winner

Draw	Entrant	Order eliminated	Eliminated by	Time	Eliminations
1	Jeff Hardy	4	Matt Hardy	06:36	3
2	Bull Buchanan	1	Jeff Hardy & Matt Hardy	02:08	0
3	Matt Hardy	3	Jeff Hardy	04:45	3
4	Faarooq	2	Jeff Hardy & Matt Hardy	00:58	0
5	Drew Carey	5	Himself	02:54	1
6	Kane	29	"Stone Cold" Steve Austin	53:46	11
7	Raven	9	Kane	08:51	0
8	Al Snow	8	Kane	07:08	0
9	Perry Saturn	10	Kane	05:02	0
10	Steve Blackman	7	Kane	03:08	0
11	Grand Master Sexay	6	Kane	01:03	0
12	The Honky Tonk Man	11	Kane	01:16	0
13	The Rock	28	Kane	38:42	3
14	The Goodfather	12	The Rock	00:13	0
15	Tazz	13	Kane	00:10	0
16	Bradshaw	18	The Undertaker	17:40	0
17	Albert	20	Kane	15:53	0
18	Hardcore Holly	21	The Undertaker	14:04	0
19	K-Kwik	16	Big Show	07:53	0
20	Val Venis	22	The Undertaker	10:22	0
21	William Regal	14	Test	02:01	0
22	Test	15	Big Show	02:08	1
23	Big Show	17	The Rock	01:23	2
24	Crash Holly	19	Kane	02:31	0
25	The Undertaker	25	Rikishi	10:45	4
26	Scotty 2 Hotty	23	Kane & The Undertaker	00:47	0
27	Stone Cold Steve Austin	-	Winner	09:38	3
28	Billy Gunn	27	"Stone Cold" Steve Austin	07:22	0
29	Haku	24	"Stone Cold" Steve Austin	02:51	0
30	Rikishi	26	The Rock	02:35	1

Kane eliminated 11 men, breaking the record for the most wrestlers eliminated in a single Royal Rumble. This record was previously held by Hulk Hogan (1989) and Stone Cold Steve Austin (1997), who both scored 10 eliminations respectively.
