= Test (wrestler) =

Canadian professional wrestler (1975–2009)

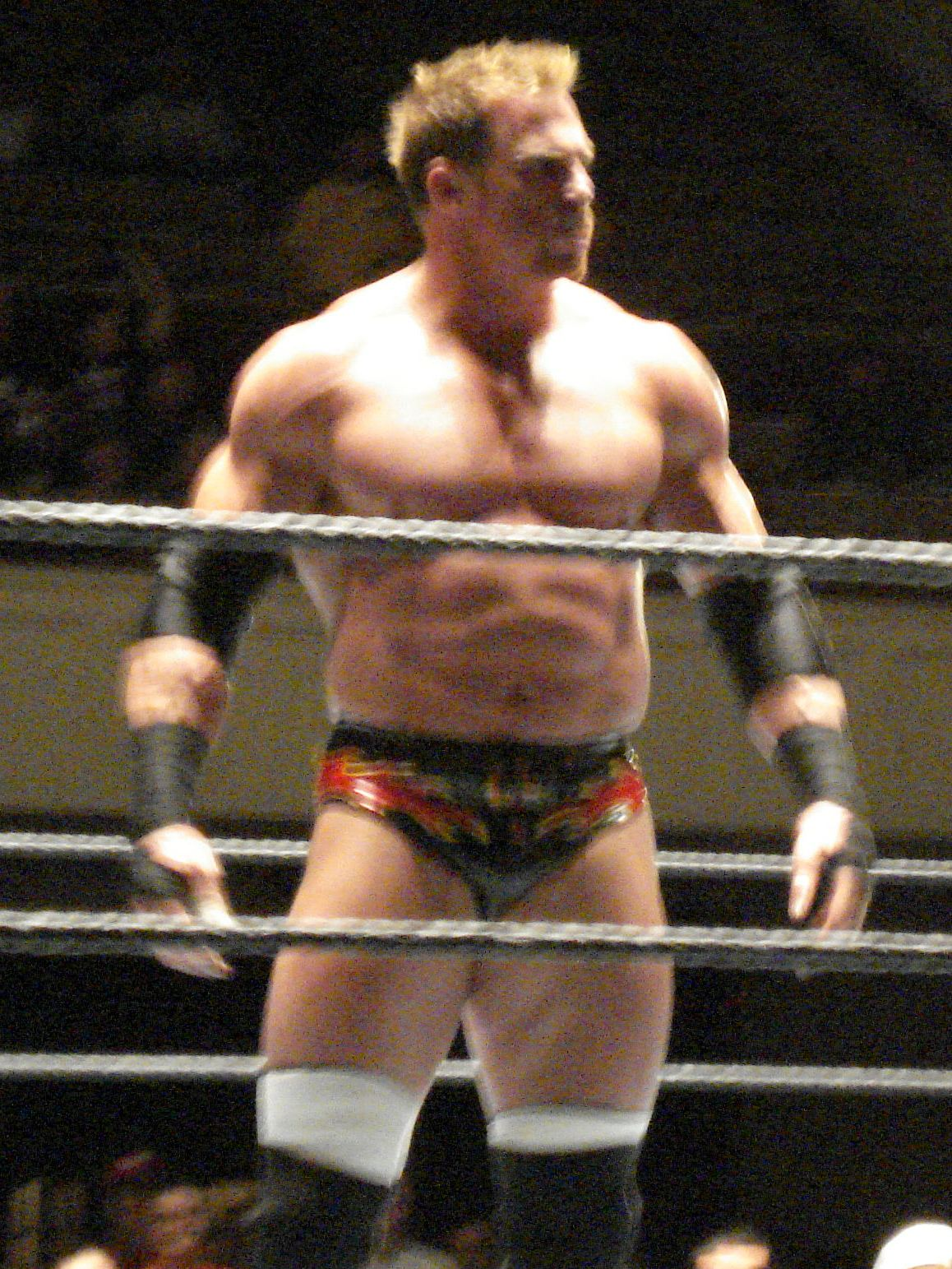
- Test in 2006
- Born: Andrew James Robert Patrick Martin; March 17, 1975; Whitby, Ontario, Canada
- Died: March 13, 2009 (aged 33); Tampa, Florida, U.S.
- Occupations: Professional wrestler; actor
- Years active: 1997–2009 (wrestler); 2001–2009 (actor)
- Partner(s): Stacy Keibler (2001–2005); Barbara Blank (2007–2009)
- Professional wrestling career
- Ring name(s): Andrew Martin; Martin Kane; T.J. Thunder; Test
- Billed height: 6 ft 6 in (198 cm)
- Billed weight: 285 lb (129 kg)
- Billed from: Toronto, Ontario, Canada
- Trained by: Leo Burke; Dory Funk Jr. Bret Hart
- Debut: October 26, 1997

Andrew James Robert Patrick Martin (March 17, 1975 – March 13, 2009) was a Canadian professional wrestler and actor. He was best known for his tenures with World Wrestling Federation/Entertainment (WWF/WWE) where he competed under the ring name Test.

After training under Bret Hart and Leo Burke, Martin began wrestling on the Canadian independent circuit in 1997. The following year, he signed with the WWF (now WWE) and initially debuted as an unnamed bodyguard, before adopting the name Test. During his nine-year tenure, he won the WWE European Championship and WWE Intercontinental Championship once each, the WWE Hardcore Championship twice, and the WCW World Tag Team Championship and WWE World Tag Team Championship with Booker T once each. Martin left WWE in 2004, but returned from 2006-2007 to wrestle on the ECW brand. After he briefly appeared for Total Nonstop Action Wrestling (TNA) in 2007, Martin would continue wrestling sporadically on the independent circuit until his death in 2009.

== Early life ==
Martin was born on March 17, 1975, in Whitby, Ontario, the son of Robert and Margaret Martin. He was the youngest of three children. He attended Henry Street High School, where he played football, hockey, lacrosse and rugby. In the mid-1990s, Martin worked as a bouncer and bartender in Oshawa.

== Professional wrestling career ==
=== Training and early career (1997–1998) ===
In 1997, while at a Planet Hollywood restaurant at the SkyDome in Toronto, Martin met WWF Canada president Carl De Marco, who introduced him to Bret Hart. After Hart offered to train him to wrestle, Martin quit both of his jobs and spent eight months training under both Hart and Leo Burke. He made his professional wrestling debut for the International Wrestling Alliance (IWA) on October 26, 1997, under the ring name Martin Kane, defeating Jamal Hughes and winning a battle royal on the same night.

Martin spent his early career on the Canadian independent circuit and wrestled under the gimmick of T.J. Thunder, a former bodyguard for Wayne Newton. He continued his training with Dory Funk Jr. at Funk's Funkin' Dojo, a training center in Ocala, Florida. In 1998, Martin wrestled for the World Wrestling Alliance (WWA) in Massachusetts. He also took part in the final event of Wild West Wrestling in Saskatchewan, where he won a triangle match for the WWW Heavyweight Championship against Burke and John Cozman.

=== World Wrestling Federation/Entertainment (1998–2004) ===
==== The Corporation (1998–1999) ====
In May 1998, Martin signed with the World Wrestling Federation (WWF). He made his debut on the October 25, 1998 episode of Sunday Night Heat as an unnamed bodyguard for the band Mötley Crüe, who were performing on the show. In a scripted event, Martin threw an overzealous fan off the stage during the band's rehearsal. On the December 14 episode of Raw is War, he aligned himself with WWF Champion The Rock by attacking his rival, Triple H, establishing himself as a heel. Martin made his in-ring debut in a tag team match with The Rock on the following episode of Raw is War, defeating D-Generation X (Triple H and X-Pac) by disqualification after interference from Kane. He soon joined The Corporation stable and received the ring name "Test", since he usually checked the mic saying "test...test..."

On January 24, 1999, Test made his pay-per-view debut at the Royal Rumble, where he entered his first Royal Rumble match at number 21, but was eliminated by Steve Austin. At WrestleMania XV on March 28, Test and D'Lo Brown faced Jeff Jarrett and Owen Hart for the WWF Tag Team Championship in a losing effort. After being removed from the Corporation, Test turned face and joined The Union, who were known to carry 2x4 boards of wood with them. The Union feuded with the Corporate Ministry and defeated them in an eight-man elimination tag team match at Over the Edge on May 23, before quietly disbanding.

==== Relationship with Stephanie McMahon and T & A (1999–2000) ====
Test then began an on-screen relationship with Stephanie McMahon, leading to a "Love Her Or Leave Her" Greenwich Street Fight against her older brother Shane McMahon at SummerSlam on August 22, which Test won for Shane's blessing. The couple were eventually engaged, but during the in-ring ceremony in November, Triple H showed a video revealing that he had drugged Stephanie and taken her to Las Vegas, Nevada, where they were married in a drive-through ceremony. Stephanie subsequently turned on Test by aligning herself with Triple H at Armageddon. For the remainder of the year, Test briefly feuded with D-Generation X, and in early 2000, held the WWF Hardcore Championship for a month.

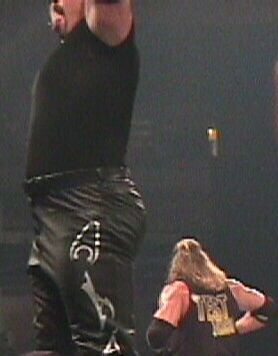
Test (right) with Albert as T&A at King of the Ring in June 2000

In March 2000, Test turned heel and formed a tag team with Albert known as T & A (Test and Albert), with Trish Stratus as their manager. They defeated Head Cheese (Al Snow and Steve Blackman) at WrestleMania 2000 on April 2 and The Dudley Boyz at Backlash on April 30. At King of the Ring on June 25, T & A took part in a fatal four-way elimination match for the WWF Tag Team Championship, which was won by Edge & Christian. T & A and Stratus also feuded with The Hardy Boyz and Lita, whom they lost to in a six-person tag team match at Fully Loaded on July 23. At Survivor Series on November 19, T & A and Stratus lost to Blackman, Crash Holly and Molly Holly. On the December 28 episode of SmackDown!, Albert attacked Test at the orders of Stephanie McMahon-Helmsley, effectively disbanding T & A and turning Test face again.

==== The Invasion and Un-Americans (2001–2002) ====
On the January 8, 2001 episode of Raw, Test lost to Albert and Stratus in a handicap match after interference from William Regal. Test defeated Regal to win the WWF European Championship on the January 22 episode of Raw. After successful defenses against the likes of Christian, Regal, Raven, and Eddie Guerrero, Test lost the title to Guerrero at WrestleMania X-Seven on April 1 after interference from Dean Malenko and Perry Saturn.

During the Invasion storyline, Test developed a friendship with WCW owner Shane McMahon and helped him defeat Big Show in a Last Man Standing match at Backlash on April 29. At Judgment Day on May 20, Test failed to win the Hardcore Championship from Rhyno in a triple threat hardcore match also involving Big Show. Test defeated Rhyno for the title on the June 14 episode of SmackDown!, but lost it in a rematch on the June 25 episode of Raw. Test remained loyal to the WWF until the August 9 episode of SmackDown!, when he joined The Alliance by helping Alliance members Chris Kanyon and Diamond Dallas Page defeat the APA (Bradshaw and Faarooq) for the WWF Tag Team Championship, turning heel once again. At SummerSlam on August 19, Test and The Dudley Boyz defeated the APA and Spike Dudley. On the September 27 episode of SmackDown!, Test and Booker T won the WCW Tag Team Championship from The Brothers of Destruction (The Undertaker and Kane), but lost the titles to The Hardy Boyz on the October 8 episode of Raw. At No Mercy on October 21, Test defeated Kane.

On the November 1 episode of SmackDown!, Test and Booker T defeated The Rock and Chris Jericho to win the WWF Tag Team Championship. Test also won the WWF Intercontinental Championship from Edge on the November 5 episode of Raw, becoming a double champion. On the November 12 episode of Raw, Test and Booker T lost the WWF Tag Team Championship to The Hardy Boyz. At Survivor Series on November 18, Test lost the Intercontinental Championship back to Edge in a unification match for the WCW United States Championship and the WWF Intercontinental Championship. Later that night, Test won a battle royal which granted him on-screen immunity from being fired for a year. At No Way Out on February 17, 2002, Test and Booker T failed to win the WWF Tag Team Championship from Spike Dudley and Tazz.

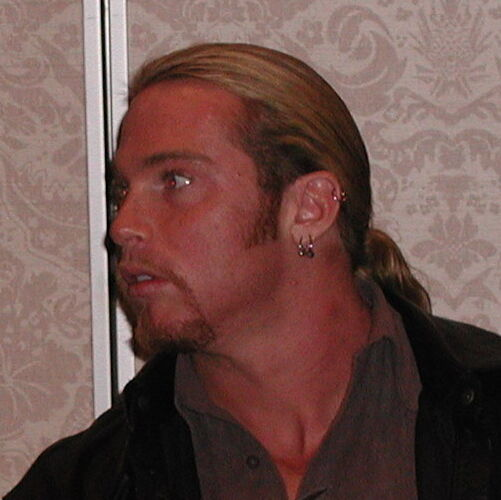
Test in 2002

As part of the 2002 WWF draft lottery, Test was drafted to the SmackDown! brand. Test competed in the King of the Ring tournament, but lost to eventual winner Brock Lesnar in the semi-finals at the titular event on June 23. On the July 4 episode of SmackDown!, Test, Christian and Lance Storm formed The Un-Americans. On the July 29 episode of Raw, The Un-Americans left SmackDown! and joined the Raw brand, where they attacked The Undertaker. At SummerSlam on August 25, Test lost to The Undertaker. After losing to the team of Kane, Goldust, Booker T and Bubba Ray Dudley at Unforgiven on September 22, The Un-Americans split in brawling fashion and disbanded on the September 30 episode of Raw.

==== Relationship with Stacy Keibler and departure (2002–2004) ====
On the October 21 episode of Raw, Test, now trading his trademark leather pants for normal wrestling trunks, defeated D-Lo Brown after a fast count from special guest referee Stacy Keibler. Test received Keibler as his on-screen girlfriend and "image consultant", who told him he should embrace his fanbase and call them his "Testicles", in line with The Rock's fan group, the "People", Kane's "Kaneanites", and Hulk Hogan's "Hulkamaniacs". This culminated with Test cutting off his long hair and turning face. In March 2003, Test began teaming with Scott Steiner and feuded with La Résistance (René Duprée and Sylvain Grenier), whom they lost to at Judgment Day on May 18.

Following Judgment Day, Test turned heel once again due to his mistreatment of Keibler, who parted ways with Test on the June 2 episode of Raw, despite being contractually obligated to remain as his manager. Test then announced his intentions to "make her his whore". At Bad Blood on June 15, Steiner defeated Test for Keibler's managerial services. On the August 18 episode of Raw, Test defeated Steiner after feigning a knee injury to regain Keibler's services. At Unforgiven on September 21, Test again defeated Steiner, forcing him to become his manservant. Two weeks later on Raw, after Test and Steiner failed to win the World Tag Team Championship from The Dudley Boyz, Steiner attacked Keibler, blaming her for the loss and for him having to take orders from Test. Test quietly freed Steiner from his obligation and the pair treated Keibler like a slave. On the December 1 episode of Raw, general manager Mick Foley fired Test and Steiner, freeing Keibler as their manager.

At the Royal Rumble on January 25, 2004, Test was scheduled to enter the titular match at number 21, but was found knocked out backstage by officials and Raw Sheriff Stone Cold Steve Austin. After it was revealed Foley attacked and replaced him, Test would gain revenge on the February 2 episode of Raw, when he and Randy Orton attacked Foley in a backstage area. In July, Test had spinal fusion surgery performed by Dr. Lloyd Youngblood due to a neck injury, which was estimated to keep him out of action for a year. On November 1, it was announced that Test was released from his WWE contract.

=== Independent circuit (2005–2006) ===
Test made his in-ring return on May 28, 2005, for Italian Championship Wrestling (ICW), teaming with Billy Gunn to defeat Mideon and Tama. At WrestleReunion 2 on August 27, Test participated in an eight-man tag team match alongside Steve Corino, The Masked Superstar and The Original Evil Clown, losing to D'Lo Brown, The Blue Meanie, Tom Prichard and Dusty Rhodes. On October 5, he appeared for World Series Wrestling (WSW) in Melbourne, defeating Samoa Joe. Later that month, he began wrestling for the Nu-Wrestling Evolution promotion in Italy, where he remained until January 2006.

=== Return to WWE (2006–2007) ===
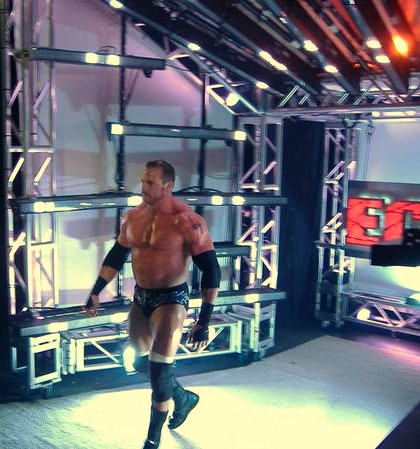
Test making his entrance on ECW

On March 22, 2006, WWE.com announced that Test had verbally agreed to return to WWE. Starting on June 20, vignettes began to play during ECW on Sci Fi, announcing that Test was debuting on the ECW brand. Test officially made his return on the July 4 episode of ECW, defeating Al Snow. Later that month, Test aligned with the fellow ECW newcomers, Mike Knox, Big Show and Matt Striker to feud with the "ECW Originals", which consisted of Tommy Dreamer, Rob Van Dam, Sabu and The Sandman. On the August 1 episode of ECW, Test and Knox defeated Sandman and Tommy Dreamer in an Extreme Rules match, with Test pinning Dreamer. Under the Extreme Rules stipulation, Test and Knox lost to Sabu and Van Dam on the September 5 episode of ECW, and Test defeated Van Dam on the October 3 episode of ECW. At Survivor Series on November 26, Test was a member of Team Big Show (Big Show, himself, Montel Vontavious Porter, Finlay and Umaga), losing to Team Cena (John Cena, Kane, Bobby Lashley, Sabu and Van Dam).

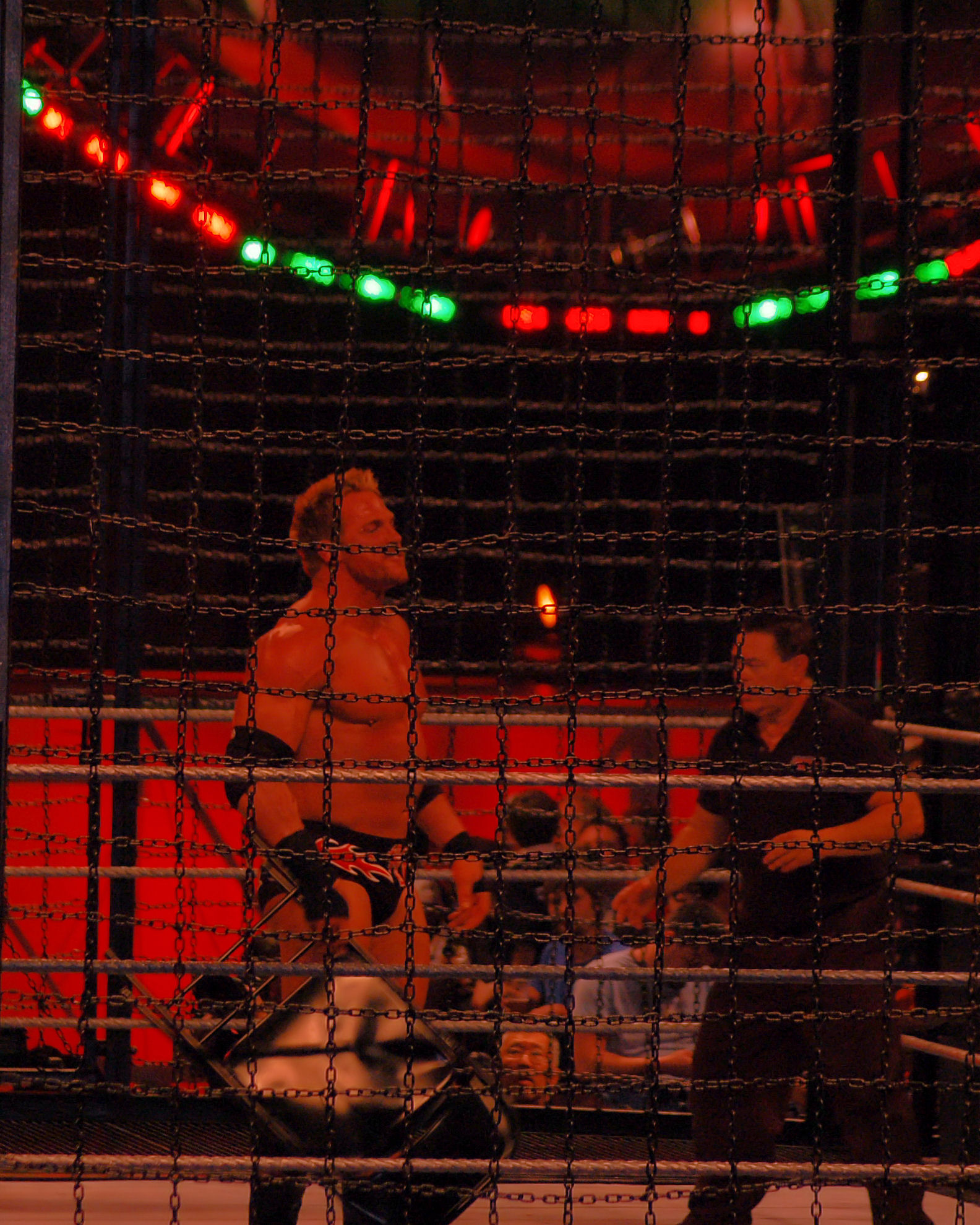
Test at December to Dismember in December 2006

At December to Dismember on December 3, Test competed in the Extreme Elimination Chamber match for the ECW World Championship, eliminating Hardcore Holly and Rob Van Dam, before being pinned by Bobby Lashley, the eventual winner. On the January 16, 2007 episode of ECW, Test competed in a triple threat match for the ECW World Championship, which Lashley won. Test failed to win the title from Lashley the following week, and at the Royal Rumble on January 28, when he got himself counted out. Two nights later on ECW, Test once again failed to win the ECW World Championship from Lashley; and afterwards tried attacking Lashley with a steel chair only to be choke-slammed by The Undertaker, who was trying to intimidate Lashley. This would end up being his final televised match in the company.

On February 18, WWE commentator Jim Ross confirmed on his blog that Test had been suspended for 30 days for violating the WWE "Wellness Program". Test was officially released from his WWE contract on February 27. Martin released a statement through his MySpace saying that the release was mutual and he had requested it.

=== Total Nonstop Action Wrestling (2007) ===
Martin debuted in Total Nonstop Action Wrestling (TNA) as a face under his real name on the August 2, 2007 episode of TNA Impact!. He allied himself with Abyss and Sting and helped them defeat A.J. Styles and Christian Cage in a tag team ladder match. At Hard Justice on August 12, Martin wrestled his first and only match for TNA, teaming with Sting and Abyss to defeat Christian's Coalition (Cage, Tomko, and Styles) in a Doomsday Chamber of Blood match.

=== Later career (2007–2009) ===
On December 19, 2007, Martin announced that he would embark on a final tour of Ireland before retiring from professional wrestling in March 2008. He spent his retirement tour wrestling for American Wrestling Rampage (AWR), facing the likes of Gangrel, The Sandman and René Duprée, whom he lost to in seven consecutive matches in November. However, Martin wrestled two more matches in Japan in 2009, defeating Lance Hoyt on February 1 and Mitsuya Nagai on February 3.

== Personal life ==
Martin dated WWE Diva Stacy Keibler from 2001 until 2005. He was also in a two-year relationship with Barbara Blank, better known in WWE as Kelly Kelly, that ended weeks before his death in March 2009.

On September 14, 2007, and April 5, 2008, Martin was arrested for driving under the influence in Hillsborough County and Pasco County, Florida. He was booked into jail both times, but was released the following day after posting bail. In August 2008, Martin entered a drug and alcohol rehabilitation center in West Palm Beach, Florida, after reaching out to WWE, his former employer, for help regarding his substance abuse.

== Death ==
On March 13, 2009, Martin was found dead in his Tampa, Florida apartment, four days prior to what would have been his 34th birthday. A neighbor noticed Martin had been lying motionless on his couch for some time, prompting them to call authorities. Painkillers and steroids were found in his apartment, and he appeared to have died during a meal since a half-eaten pizza and soda were found near his body. Toxicology analysis revealed that Martin's death was caused by an accidental overdose of the prescription pain medication oxycodone. His body was cremated and his remains were flown to his family in his hometown of Whitby.

Forensic pathologist Bennet Omalu later examined Martin's brain and determined that he suffered from severe chronic traumatic encephalopathy (CTE), a brain condition caused by repeated concussions and subconcussive head injuries. Fellow Canadian wrestler and one of Martin's idols, Chris Benoit, also suffered from CTE before his death in June 2007, and it was theorized to be a factor in Benoit's double-murder and suicide.

== Filmography ==
Year	Title	Role	Notes
1999	Biography	Himself	Documentary; episode: "The Life and Death of Owen Hart"
2001	18 Wheels of Justice	Nicolas James Barton	Episode: "The Cage"
2002	Fear Factor	Himself	Television series
2002	Kim Possible	Steel Toe (voice)	Episode: "Pain King vs. Cleopatra"
2003	Girls Gone Wild: Live from Spring Break	Himself	Music video
2003	The New Tom Green Show	Himself	Television series
2007	Grindhouse	Nazi Boxer	Film; segment: "Werewolf Women of the SS"; uncredited
2010	Medium Raw: Night of the Wolf	Benjamin Jacobs	Television film; posthumous release

== Championships and accomplishments ==
- Pro Wrestling Illustrated
  - Ranked No. 37 of the 500 top singles wrestlers in the PWI 500 in 2001
- Wild West Wrestling
  - WWW Heavyweight Championship (1 time)
- World Wrestling Federation/World Wrestling Entertainment
  - WWF Intercontinental Championship (1 time)
  - WWF European Championship (1 time)
  - WWF Hardcore Championship (2 times)
  - WWF Tag Team Championship (1 time) – with Booker T
  - WCW Tag Team Championship (1 time) – with Booker T

== See also ==
- List of premature professional wrestling deaths
