= 1997 in professional wrestling =

1997 in professional wrestling describes the year's events in the world of professional wrestling.

== List of notable promotions ==
These promotions held notable events in 1997.

Promotion Name	Abbreviation	Notes
Catch Wrestling Association	CWA	
Consejo Mundial de Lucha Libre	CMLL	
Extreme Championship Wrestling	ECW	
Frontier Martial-Arts Wrestling	FMW	
Lucha Libre AAA Worldwide	AAA	The "AAA" abbreviation has been used since the mid-1990s and had previously stood for the promotion's original name Asistencia Asesoría y Administración.
New Japan Pro-Wrestling	NJPW	
World Championship Wrestling	WCW	
World Wrestling Council	WWC	
World Wrestling Federation	WWF	

== Calendar of notable shows ==
=== January ===
Date	Promotion(s)	Event	Location	Main Event
January 4	NJPW	Wrestling World	Tokyo, Japan	Shinya Hashimoto (c) defeated Riki Choshu in a Singles match for the IWGP Heavyweight Championship
January 11	ECW	House Party	Philadelphia, Pennsylvania, United States	Pitbull #1 defeated Shane Douglas (c) by count out in a Singles match for the ECW World Television Championship
January 19	WWF	Royal Rumble	San Antonio, Texas, United States	Shawn Michaels defeated Sycho Sid (c) in a Singles match for the WWF Championship
January 21	WCW	Clash of the Champions XXXIV	Milwaukee, Wisconsin, United States	Lex Luger defeated Scott Hall by disqualification in a Singles match
January 25	WCW: nWo	Souled Out	Cedar Rapids, Iowa, United States	Hollywood Hogan (nWo) (c) fought The Giant (WCW) to a no contest in a Singles match for the WCW World Heavyweight Championship
January 31	ECW	Winter Blowout	Lake Grove, New York, United States	The Sandman and Tommy Dreamer defeated Raven and Stevie Richards in a tag team match
(c) – denotes defending champion(s)

=== February ===
Date	Promotion(s)	Event	Location	Main Event
February 1	ECW	Crossing the Line Again	Philadelphia, Pennsylvania, United States	The Pitbulls (Pitbull #1 and Pitbull #2) and Tommy Dreamer defeated The Triple Threat (Brian Lee, Chris Candido, and Shane Douglas) in a Six man tag team match
February 16	WWF	In Your House 13: Final Four	Chattanooga, Tennessee, United States	Bret Hart defeated Stone Cold Steve Austin, Vader and The Undertaker in a Four Corners elimination match for the vacant WWF World Heavyweight Championship
February 21	AAA	Rey de Reyes	Ciudad Madero, Tamaulipas, Mexico	Latin Lover defeated Heavy Metal, Héctor Garza and Octagón in a 1997 Rey de Reyes final
February 21-February 22	ECW	CyberSlam	Queens, New York/Philadelphia, Pennsylvania, United States	February 21: The Eliminators (Perry Saturn and John Kronus) (c) defeated Sabu and Rob Van Dam in a Tables and Ladders match for the ECW World Tag Team Championship; February 22: Sabu defeated Chris Candido in a Singles match
February 23	WCW	SuperBrawl VII	Daly City, California, United States	Hollywood Hogan (c) defeated Roddy Piper in a Singles match for the WCW World Heavyweight Championship
February 28	ECW	Mountain Top Madness	Jim Thorpe, Pennsylvania, United States	Sabu defeated Chris Candido in a Singles match
(c) – denotes defending champion(s)

=== March ===
Date	Promotion(s)	Event	Location	Main Event
March 15	ECW	Hostile City Showdown	Philadelphia, Pennsylvania, United States	Raven (c) defeated Stevie Richards and Tommy Dreamer by pinfall in a Three way dance for the ECW World Heavyweight Championship
March 16	WCW	Uncensored	North Charleston, South Carolina, United States	Team nWo (Hollywood Hogan, Randy Savage, Kevin Nash and Scott Hall) defeated Team Piper (Roddy Piper, Chris Benoit, Steve McMichael and Jeff Jarrett) and Team WCW (Lex Luger, The Giant and Scott Steiner) in a Triangle Elimination match
March 21	CMLL	Homenaje a Salvador Lutteroth	Mexico City, Mexico	Silver King defeated La Fiera in a Best two-out-of-three falls Lucha de Apuestas, Hair vs. Hair match
March 23	WWF	WrestleMania 13	Rosemont, Illinois, United States	The Undertaker defeated Sycho Sid (c) in a No Disqualification match for the WWF Championship
(c) – denotes defending champion(s)

=== April ===
Date	Promotion(s)	Event	Location	Main Event
April 4	CMLL	International Gran Prix	Mexico City, Mexico	Steele defeated Rayo de Jalisco Jr. in a 1997 International Gran Prix final match
April 6	WCW	Spring Stampede	Tupelo, Mississippi, United States	Diamond Dallas Page defeated Randy Savage in a No Disqualification match
April 12	NJPW	Battle Formation	Tokyo, Japan	Naoya Ogawa defeated Shinya Hashimoto by referee's decision in a Different Style Fight
April 12	N/A	Second Annual Eddie Gilbert Memorial Show	Cherry Hill, New Jersey, United States	Goldust defeated Derrick Domino in a Singles match
April 13	ECW	Barely Legal	Philadelphia, Pennsylvania, United States	Terry Funk defeated Raven (c) in a Singles match for the ECW World Heavyweight Championship
April 18	CMLL	41. Aniversario de Arena México	Mexico City, Mexico	Steele defeated Rayo de Jalisco Jr. (c) in a Best two-out-of-three falls match for the CMLL World Heavyweight Championship
April 20	WWF	In Your House 14: Revenge of the 'Taker	Rochester, New York, United States	Stone Cold Steve Austin defeated Bret Hart by disqualification in a Singles match to determine the #1 contender to the WWF Championship
April 29	FMW	FMW 8th Anniversary Show	Yokohama, Japan	Megumi Kudo defeated Shark Tsuchiya (c) in a No Rope 200 Volt Double Hell Double Barbed Wire Barricade Double Landmine Crushed Glass Electrical Barbed Wire Deathmatch for the FMW Independent and WWA World Women's Championship
(c) – denotes defending champion(s)

=== May ===
Date	Promotion(s)	Event	Location	Main Event
May 8	FMW	Japanese Survival	Tokyo, Japan	Hido, The Great Nita and WING Kanemura vs. Fuyuki-gun (Gedo, Jado and Kodo Fuyuki)
May 10	ECW	Chapter 2	Philadelphia, Pennsylvania, United States	Terry Funk (c) defeated Raven, The Sandman, and Stevie Richards by pinfall in a Four way dance for the ECW World Heavyweight Championship
May 11	WWF	In Your House 15: A Cold Day in Hell	Richmond, Virginia, United States	The Undertaker (c) defeated Stone Cold Steve Austin in a Singles match for the WWF Championship
May 17	ECW	The Buffalo Invasion	Buffalo, New York, United States	Terry Funk (c) defeated Raven, the Sandman, and Stevie Richards by pinfall in a Four way dance for the ECW World Heavyweight Championship
May 18	WCW	Slamboree	Charlotte, North Carolina, United States	Ric Flair, Roddy Piper and Kevin Greene defeated The nWo (Kevin Nash, Scott Hall and Syxx) in a Six-man tag team match
(c) – denotes defending champion(s)

=== June ===
Date	Promotion(s)	Event	Location	Main Event
June 6	N/A	Second Annual Ilio DiPaolo Memorial Show	Buffalo, New York, United States	The Outsiders (Scott Hall and Kevin Nash) (c) defeated Lex Luger and The Giant in a tag team match for the WCW World Tag Team Championship
June 7	ECW	Wrestlepalooza	Philadelphia, Pennsylvania, United States	The Eliminators (John Kronus and Perry Saturn) (c) defeated The Dudley Boyz (Buh Buh Ray Dudley and D-Von Dudley) in a tag team match for the ECW World Tag Team Championship
June 8	WWF	King of the Ring	Providence, Rhode Island, United States	The Undertaker (c) defeated Faarooq in a Singles match for the WWF Championship
June 13	AAA	Triplemanía V-A	Tijuana, Baja California, Mexico	Perro Aguayo, Tinieblas Jr. and Canek defeated Jake Roberts, Killer, and Gorgeous George III in a six-man "Lucha Libre rules" tag team match
June 15	AAA	Triplemanía V-B	Naucalpan, Mexico	Perro Aguayo, Octagón, Cibernético and Canek defeated Jake Roberts, Gorgeous George III, El Cobarde Jr. and Fuerza Guerrera in an eight-man "Atómicos" tag team match
June 15	WCW	The Great American Bash	Moline, Illinois, United States	Randy Savage defeated Diamond Dallas Page in a Falls Count Anywhere match
June 28	ECW	Orgy of Violence	Philadelphia, Pennsylvania, United States	Rob Van Dam and Sabu defeated the Sandman and Tommy Dreamer by pinfall in a tag team match
(c) – denotes defending champion(s)

=== July ===
Date	Promotion(s)	Event	Location	Main Event
July 5	CWA	Euro Catch Festival	Graz, Austria	Rambo (c) defeated Duke Droese in a Singles match for the CWA World Heavyweight Championship
July 6	WWF	In Your House 16: Canadian Stampede	Calgary, Alberta, Canada	The Hart Foundation (Bret Hart, Brian Pillman, The British Bulldog, Jim Neidhart and Owen Hart) defeated Ken Shamrock, Goldust, The Legion of Doom (Animal and Hawk) and Stone Cold Steve Austin in a Ten-man tag team match
July 13	WCW	Bash at the Beach	Daytona Beach, Florida, United States	Lex Luger and The Giant defeated Hollywood Hogan and Dennis Rodman by submission in a tag team match
July 19	ECW	Heat Wave	Philadelphia, Pennsylvania, United States	Jerry Lawler, Rob Van Dam, and Sabu wrestled Rick Rude, The Sandman, and Tommy Dreamer to a no contest in a Steel cage match
(c) – denotes defending champion(s)

=== August ===
Date	Promotion(s)	Event	Location	Main Event
August 2	FMW	Shiodome Legend	Tokyo, Japan	W*ING Kanemura defeated Masato Tanaka in a No Ropes Exploding Barbed Wire Deathmatch for the right to face Atsushi Onita at Fall Spectacular
August 3	WWF	SummerSlam	East Rutherford, New Jersey, United States	Bret Hart defeated The Undertaker (c) in a Singles match for the WWF Championship with Shawn Michaels as special guest referee
August 9	ECW	Born to be Wired	Philadelphia, Pennsylvania, United States	Sabu defeated Terry Funk (c) by pinfall in a Barbed wire match for the ECW World Heavyweight Championship
August 9	WCW	Road Wild	Sturgis, South Dakota, United States	Hollywood Hogan defeated Lex Luger (c) in a Singles match for the WCW World Heavyweight Championship
August 15	WWC	WWC 24th Aniversario	Bayamón, Puerto Rico	Ray Gonzales (WWC Universal Heavyweight Champion) defeated Tom Brandi in a Singles match
August 17	ECW	Hardcore Heaven	Fort Lauderdale, Florida, United States	Shane Douglas defeated Sabu (c) and Terry Funk in a Three-way dance for the ECW World Heavyweight Championship
August 21	WCW	Clash of the Champions XXXV	Nashville, Tennessee, United States	Scott Hall and Randy Savage (c) defeated Diamond Dallas Page and Lex Luger in a tag team match for the WCW World Tag Team Championship
(c) – denotes defending champion(s)

=== September ===
Date	Promotion(s)	Event	Location	Main Event
September 7	WWF	Ground Zero: In Your House	Louisville, Kentucky, United States	Shawn Michaels vs. The Undertaker ended in a no contest in a Singles match
September 11	ECW	WrestleFest: 50 Years of Funk	Amarillo, Texas, United States	Bret Hart defeated Terry Funk in a No Disqualification match
September 14	AAA	Verano de Escándalo	Tonalá, Jalisco, Mexico	Perro Aguayo, Perro Aguayo Jr. and Heavy Metal defeated Sangre Chicano, El Picudo and El Cobarde II in a Steel Cage Elimination Match, Lucha de Apuestas; as the last man in the cage, Cobarde II had his head shaved after the match.
September 14	WCW	Fall Brawl	Winston-Salem, North Carolina, United States	The nWo (Buff Bagwell, Kevin Nash, Syxx and Konnan) defeated The Four Horsemen (Chris Benoit, Steve McMichael, Ric Flair and Curt Hennig) in a WarGames match
September 19	CMLL	CMLL 64th Anniversary Show	Mexico City, Mexico	Hijo del Santo defeated Negro Casas in a Lucha de Apuestas mask vs. hair match
September 20	ECW	As Good as It Gets	Philadelphia, Pennsylvania, United States	The Gangstanators (John Kronus and New Jack) defeated the Dudley Boyz (Buh Buh Ray Dudley and D-Von Dudley) (c) by pinfall in a Tag team match for the ECW World Tag Team Championship
September 20	WWF	WWF One Night Only	Birmingham, England, United Kingdom	Shawn Michaels defeated The British Bulldog (c) in a Singles match for the WWF European Championship
September 28	FMW	Fall Spectacular	Kawasaki, Kanagawa, Japan	Atsushi Onita defeated W*ING Kanemura in a No Ropes Exploding Barbed Wire Steel Cage Time Bomb Death Match
(c) – denotes defending champion(s)

=== October ===
Date	Promotion(s)	Event	Location	Main Event
October 5	WWF	Badd Blood: In Your House	St. Louis, Missouri, United States	Shawn Michaels defeated The Undertaker in a Hell in a Cell match to determine the #1 contender to the WWF Championship at Survivor Series
October 12	N/A	Second Annual Ikki Kajiwara Memorial Show	Tokyo, Japan	Yoshiaki Fujiwara and Super Tiger (Tiger Mask I) fought to a no-contest in a Singles match with Antonio Inoki as special guest referee
October 26	WCW	Halloween Havoc	Paradise, Nevada, United States	Roddy Piper defeated Hollywood Hogan by submission in a Steel cage match
October 30	N/A	First Annual Plum Mariko Memorial Show	Tokyo, Japan	Cutie Suzuki and Dynamite Kansai defeated Mayumi Ozaki in a handicap match
October 31	ECW	Fright Fight	Philadelphia, Pennsylvania, United States	The Gangstanators (John Kronus and New Jack) defeated Axl Rotten and Balls Mahoney and The Dudley Boyz (Buh Buh Ray Dudley and D-Von Dudley) in a Tag Team Three Way Elimination Match
(c) – denotes defending champion(s)

=== November ===
Date	Promotion(s)	Event	Location	Main Event
November 8	ECW	Ultimate Jeopardy	Philadelphia, Pennsylvania, United States	Taz and Tommy Dreamer defeated Rob Van Dam and Sabu by pinfall in a tag team match
November 9	WWF	Survivor Series	Montreal, Quebec, Canada	Shawn Michaels "defeated" Bret Hart (c) by submission in a Singles match for the WWF Championship
November 23	WCW	World War 3	Auburn Hills, Michigan, United States	Scott Hall won by last eliminating The Giant in a 60-man World War 3 match for a future WCW World Heavyweight Championship match
November 30	ECW	November to Remember	Monaca, Pennsylvania, United States	Shane Douglas defeated Bam Bam Bigelow (c) in a Singles match for the ECW World Heavyweight Championship
(c) – denotes defending champion(s)

=== December ===
Date	Promotion(s)	Event	Location	Main Event
December 6	ECW	Better Than Ever	Philadelphia, Pennsylvania, United States	Rob Van Dam and Sabu defeated Taz and Tommy Dreamer by pinfall in a tag team match
December 7	WWF	D-Generation X: In Your House	Springfield, Massachusetts, United States	Ken Shamrock defeated Shawn Michaels (c) by disqualification in a Singles match for the WWF Championship
December 13	AAA	Guerra de Titanes	Madero, Mexico	Perro Aguayo Jr. defeated Picudo, match also included Heavy Metal and Sangre Chicana in a Steel cage Lucha de Apuestas "hair vs. hair" match
December 28	WCW	Starrcade	Washington, D.C., United States	Sting defeated Hollywood Hogan (c) by submission in a Singles match for the WCW World Heavyweight Championship
(c) – denotes defending champion(s)

== Notable events ==
=== January ===
- January 4 - WWF Shotgun Saturday Night debuts live from New York City, New York
- January 25 - New World Order has their nWo Souled Out Pay Per View live from Ceder Rapids, Iowa

=== February ===
- February 24 - ECW "invades" WWF Monday Night Raw

=== April ===
- April 13 - Extreme Championship Wrestling debuts live on Pay Per View for the first time with ECW Barely Legal from the ECW Arena in Philadelphia, Pennsylvania headlined with Sabu vs Tazz

=== August ===
- August 21 - The final WCW Clash of the Champions XXXV prime time special on TBS was held in Nashville, Tennessee headlined with Scott Hall and Randy Savage vs Lex Luger and Diamond Dallas Page.

=== November ===
- November 9 - The Montreal Screwjob
- After a long history of Memphis Wrestling the United States Wrestling Association closes its doors in November.

=== December ===
- December 30 - Jeff Jarrett defeated Blackjack Bradshaw on a WWF Raw is War taping in Uniondale, New York to win the NWA North American Heavyweight title.

== Tournaments and accomplishments ==
=== AAA ===
Tournaments	Winner	Date won	Notes
Rey de Reyes	Octagón	February 21	

=== AJW ===
Accomplishment	Winner	Date won	Notes
Japan Grand Prix 1997	Kaoru Ito	August 10	
Tag League The Best 1997	Kaoru Ito and Yumiko Hotta	December 21	

=== AJPW ===
Accomplishment	Winner	Date won	Notes
Champion Carnival 1997	Toshiaki Kawada	April 19	
World's Strongest Determination League 1997	Toshiaki Kawada and Akira Taue	December 5	

=== WCW ===
Tournaments	Winner	Date won	Notes
WCW Women's Cruiserweight Championship Tournament	Toshie Uematsu	April 7	
World War 3	Scott Hall	November 23	

=== WWF ===
Tournaments	Winner	Date won	Notes
Royal Rumble	Stone Cold Steve Austin	January 19	
WWF European Championship Tournament	The British Bulldog	February 26	
Kuwait Cup	Tiger Ali Singh	April 13	
King of the Ring	Hunter Hearst Helmsley	June 8	
WWF Tag Team Championship Tournament	Stone Cold Steve Austin and Dude Love	July 14	
WWF Light Heavyweight Championship Tournament	Taka Michinoku	December 7	

==== Slammy Awards ====
Poll	Winner
New Sensation	Rocky Maivia
Best Dressed	Sable
Best Tattoo	The Undertaker
Match of the Year	Shawn Michaels vs. Bret Hart at WrestleMania XII
Best Hair	Hunter Hearst Helmsley
Loose Screw	Mankind
Best Bow Tie	Owen Hart
Best Entrance Music	The Undertaker
Best Finisher	Shawn Michaels – Sweet Chin Music
Best Couple	Goldust and Marlena
Freedom of Speech	Stone Cold Steve Austin
Star of the Highest Magnitude	The Undertaker
Lifetime Achievement Award	Arnold Skaaland
Miss Slammy	Sable

== Awards and honors ==
=== Pro Wrestling Illustrated ===
Category	Winner
PWI Wrestler of the Year	Lex Luger
PWI Tag Team of the Year	The Outsiders (Scott Hall and Kevin Nash)
PWI Match of the Year	Bret Hart vs. Stone Cold Steve Austin (WrestleMania 13)
PWI Feud of the Year	Diamond Dallas Page vs. Randy Savage
PWI Most Popular Wrestler of the Year	Sting
PWI Most Hated Wrestler of the Year	Bret Hart
PWI Comeback of the Year	Bret Hart
PWI Most Improved Wrestler of the Year	Ken Shamrock
PWI Most Inspirational Wrestler of the Year	Terry Funk
PWI Rookie of the Year	Prince Iaukea
PWI Lifetime Achievement	Arn Anderson
PWI Editor's Award	Bill Alfonso

=== Wrestling Observer Newsletter ===
==== Wrestling Observer Newsletter awards ====
Category	Winner
Wrestler of the Year	Mitsuharu Misawa
Most Outstanding	Mitsuharu Misawa
Best Box Office Draw	Hulk Hogan
Feud of the Year	Stone Cold Steve Austin vs. The Hart Foundation
Tag Team of the Year	Mitsuharu Misawa and Jun Akiyama
Most Improved	Tatsuhito Takaiwa
Best on Interviews	Stone Cold Steve Austin

==== Wrestling Observer Newsletter Hall of Fame ====
Inductee
Édouard Carpentier
El Hijo del Santo
Toshiaki Kawada
Jimmy Lennon
William Muldoon

== Title changes ==
=== ECW ===
ECW World Heavyweight Championship
Incoming champion – Raven
Date	Winner	Event/Show	Note(s)
April 13	Terry Funk	Barely Legal	
August 9	Sabu	Born to be Wired	
August 17	Shane Douglas	Hardcore Heaven	
October 16	Bam Bam Bigelow	Live event	
November 30	Shane Douglas	November to Remember	

ECW World Television Championship
Incoming champion – Shane Douglas
Date	Winner	Event/Show	Note(s)
June 7	Taz	Wrestlepalooza	

ECW World Tag Team Championship
Incoming champions – The Eliminators (Kronus and Saturn)
Date	Winner	Event/Show	Note(s)
March 15	The Dudley Boyz (Buh Buh Ray and D-Von Dudley)	Hostile City Showdown	
April 13	The Eliminators (Kronus and Saturn)	Barely Legal	
June 20	The Dudley Boyz (Buh Buh Ray and D-Von Dudley)	Hardcore TV #218	
July 19	The Gangstas (Mustapha Saed and New Jack)	Heat Wave (1997)/Hardcore TV #222	
August 17	The Dudley Boyz (Buh Buh Ray and D-Von Dudley)	Hardcore Heaven	
September 20	The Gangstanators (Kronus and New Jack)	As Good as it Gets	
October 18	The Full Blooded Italians (Little Guido and Tracy Smothers)	Hardcore TV #236	
December 5	The Can-Am Express (Doug Furnas and Phil LaFon)	Live event	
December 6	Chris Candido and Lance Storm	Better than Ever	

=== FMW ===
FMW Double Championship
Incoming champion – The Gladiator
Date	Winner	Event/Show	Note(s)
September 28	Masato Tanaka	Fall Spectacular	

FMW Brass Knuckles Tag Team Championship
Incoming champions – The Headhunters (A and B)
Date	Winner	Event/Show	Note(s)
April 25	W*ING Alliance (W*ING Kanemura and Hido)	Fighting Creation Tour	
August 21	Funk Masters of Wrestling (Mr. Gannosuke and Hisakatsu Oya)	Super Dynamism Tour	
October 19	ZEN (Atsushi Onita and Yukihiro Kanemura)	Power Splash Tour	
November	Vacant	N/A	
November 28	ZEN/Team No Respect (Mr. Gannosuke and Yukihiro Kanemura)	Scramble Survivor Tour	

FMW Women's Championship
Incoming champion – Megumi Kudo
Date	Winner	Event/Show	Note(s)
March 21	Shark Tsuchiya	Winning Road tour	
April 29	Megumi Kudo	8th Anniversary Show	
June 13	Vacant	King of Fight tour	
September 28	Shark Tsuchiya	Fall Spectacular	
September 28	Retired	N/A	

FMW Independent World Junior Heavyweight Championship
Incoming champion – Taka Michinoku
Date	Winner	Event/Show	Note(s)
June 29	El Satánico	House show	
August 25	Taka Michinoku	House show	
December 18	Vacant	N/A	

FMW World Street Fight 6-Man Tag Team Championship
Incoming champions – Funk Masters of Wrestling (Hisakatsu Oya, Headhunter A and Headhunter B)
Date	Winner	Event/Show	Note(s)
March 21	Fuyuki-Gun (Kodo Fuyuki, Jado and Gedo)	FMW	
July 8	Vacant	N/A	
August 5	Funk Masters of Wrestling (The Gladiator, Hisakatsu Oya and Mr. Gannosuke)	FMW	
August 31	Hayabusa, Masato Tanaka and Koji Nakagawa	FMW	
October 14	ZEN (Atsushi Onita, Tetsuhiro Kuroda and Hido)	FMW	
December 20	Hayabusa, Masato Tanaka and Hisakatsu Oya	Super Extreme Wrestling War tour	

=== NJPW ===
IWGP Heavyweight Championship
Incoming champion – Shinya Hashimoto
Date	Winner	Event/Show	Note(s)
August 31	Kensuke Sasaki	Final Power Hall in Yokohama	

IWGP Tag Team Championship
Incoming champions – Cho-Ten (Hiroyoshi Tenzan and Masahiro Chono)
Date	Winner	Event/Show	Note(s)
January 4	Kengo Kimura and Tatsumi Fujinami	Wrestling World 1997	
April 12	Kensuke Sasaki and Riki Choshu	Battle Formation 1997	
May 3	The Bull Powers (Manabu Nakanishi and Satoshi Kojima)	Strong Style Evolution in Osaka Dome	
August 10	Kazuo Yamazaki and Kensuke Sasaki	The Four Heaven in Nagoya Dome	
October 19	Keiji Mutoh and Masahiro Chono	nWo Typhoon 1997	

IWGP Junior Heavyweight Championship
Incoming champion – Último Dragón
Date	Winner	Event/Show	Note(s)
January 4	Jushin Thunder Liger	Wrestling World 1997	
July 6	El Samurai	Live event	
August 10	Shinjiro Otani	The Four Heaven in Nagoya Dome	

=== WCW ===
WCW World Heavyweight Championship
Incoming champion – Hollywood Hogan
Date	Winner	Event/Show	Note(s)
August 4	Lex Luger	Nitro	
August 9	Hollywood Hogan	Road Wild	
December 28	Sting	Starrcade	

WCW Cruiserweight Championship
Incoming champion – Ultimate Dragon
Date	Winner	Event/Show	Note(s)
January 21	Dean Malenko	Clash of the Champions XXXIV	
February 23	Syxx	SuperBrawl VII	
June 28	Chris Jericho	Saturday Nitro	
July 28	Alex Wright	Nitro	
August 12	Chris Jericho	Saturday Night	
September 14	Eddie Guerrero	Fall Brawl	
October 26	Rey Misterio Jr.	Halloween Havoc	
November 10	Eddie Guerrero	Nitro	
December 29	Ultimate Dragon	Nitro	

WCW United States Heavyweight Championship
Incoming champion – Eddie Guerrero
Date	Winner	Event/Show	Note(s)
March 16	Dean Malenko	Uncensored	
June 9	Jeff Jarrett	Nitro	
August 21	Steve McMichael	Clash of the Champions XXXV	
September 15	Curt Hennig	Nitro	
December 28	Diamond Dallas Page	Starrcade	

WCW Women's Championship
Incoming champion – Akira Hokuto
Date	Winner	Event/Show	Note(s)
June 15	Vacant	N/A	
September 20	Devil Masami	N/A	
September 20	Retired	N/A	

WCW Women's Cruiserweight Championship
(Title created)
Date	Winner	Event/Show	Note(s)
April 7	Toshie Uematsu	WCW Main Event	
July 19	Yoshiko Tamura	The Dream & Future ~ 2nd Jr. All Stars	
September 20	Sugar Sato	GAEA Double Destiny	

WCW World Television Championship
Incoming champion – Lord Steven Regal
Date	Winner	Event/Show	Note(s)
February 17	Prince Iaukea	Nitro	
April 7	Ultimate Dragon	Nitro	
May 18	Lord Steven Regal	Slamboree	
July 22	Ultimate Dragon	Nitro	
August 21	Alex Wright	Clash of the Champions XXXV	
September 22	Disco Inferno	Nitro	
November 3	Perry Saturn	Nitro	
December 8	Disco Inferno	Nitro	
December 29	Booker T	Nitro	

WCW World Tag Team Championship
Incoming champions – The Outsiders (Kevin Nash and Scott Hall)
Date	Winner	Event/Show	Note(s)
January 25	The Steiner Brothers (Rick and Scott Steiner)	Souled Out	
January 27	The Outsiders (Kevin Nash and Scott Hall)	Nitro	
February 23	Lex Luger and The Giant	SuperBrawl VII	
February 24	The Outsiders (Kevin Nash and Scott Hall)	Nitro	
October 13	The Steiner Brothers (Rick and Scott Steiner)	Nitro	

=== WWF ===
WWF World Heavyweight Championship
Incoming champion – Sycho Sid
Date	Winner	Event/Show	Note(s)
January 19	Shawn Michaels	Royal Rumble	
February 13	Vacant	Raw	Forfeited the title due to a knee injury
February 16	Bret Hart	In Your House 13: Final Four	This was a four-way elimination match for the vacant title also involving Stone Cold Steve Austin, The Undertaker and Vader.
February 17	Sycho Sid	Raw	
March 23	The Undertaker	WrestleMania 13	
August 3	Bret Hart	SummerSlam	Shawn Michaels was the guest referee.
November 9	Shawn Michaels	Survivor Series	Montreal screwjob

WWF Intercontinental Championship
Incoming champion – Hunter Hearst Helmsley
Date	Winner	Event/Show	Note(s)
February 13	Rocky Maivia	Raw	
April 28	Owen Hart	Raw Is War	
August 3	Stone Cold Steve Austin	SummerSlam	
September 8	Vacant	Raw Is War	Vacated due to a neck injury that Stone Cold Steve Austin suffered in winning the title
October 5	Owen Hart	Badd Blood: In Your House	Defeated Faarooq in a tournament final
November 9	Stone Cold Steve Austin	Survivor Series	
December 8	The Rock	Raw Is War	Austin handed the championship belt to The Rock, who was formerly known as Rocky Maivia

WWF European Championship
(Title created)
Date	Winner	Event/Show	Note(s)
February 26	The British Bulldog	Raw	Aired on tape delay on March 3. Defeated Owen Hart in a tournament final to become first champion
September 20	Shawn Michaels	WWF One Night Only	
December 11	Triple H	Raw Is War	Aired on tape delay on December 22.

WWF Light Heavyweight Championship
Incoming champion – N/A
Date	Winner	Event/Show	Note(s)
December 7	Taka Michinoku	D-Generation X: In Your House	The title was previously defended in Universal Wrestling Association (1981–1995) and Michinoku Pro Wrestling (1995–1997) in a partnership with the WWF, but the title was returned exclusively to the WWF in 1997. Michinoku defeated Brian Christopher in a tournament final to become recognized as the first WWF Light Heavyweight Champion under WWF's banner; they do not recognize any previous champions.

WWF Tag Team Championship
Incoming champions – Owen Hart and the British Bulldog
Date	Winner	Event/Show	Note(s)
May 26	Stone Cold Steve Austin and Shawn Michaels	Raw Is War	
July 14	Vacant	Raw Is War	Vacated after Shawn Michaels got into a backstage fight with Bret Hart.
July 14	Stone Cold Steve Austin and Dude Love	Raw Is War	
September 7	Vacant	Ground Zero: In Your House	Vacated after Stone Cold Steve Austin sustained an injury.
September 7	The Headbangers (Mosh and Thrasher)	Ground Zero: In Your House	Won in four way elimination match involving The Legion of Doom, Owen Hart and the British Bulldog and The Godwinns
October 5	The Godwinns (Henry O. and Phineas I. Godwinn)	Badd Blood: In Your House	
October 7	The Legion of Doom (Animal and Hawk)	Raw Is War	Aired on tape delay on October 13.
November 24	The New Age Outlaws (Billy Gunn and Road Dogg)	Raw Is War	

== Debuts ==
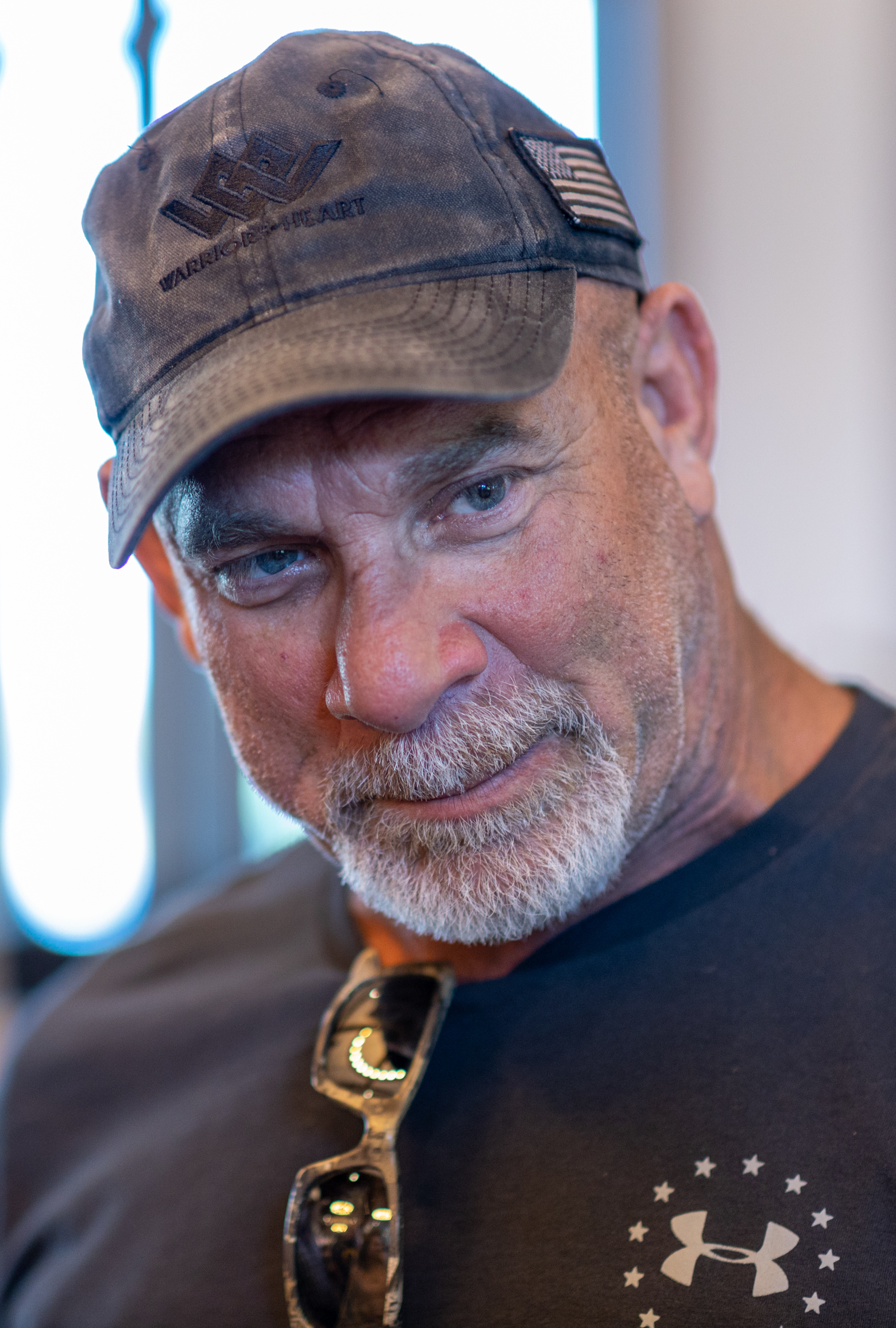
Bill Goldberg

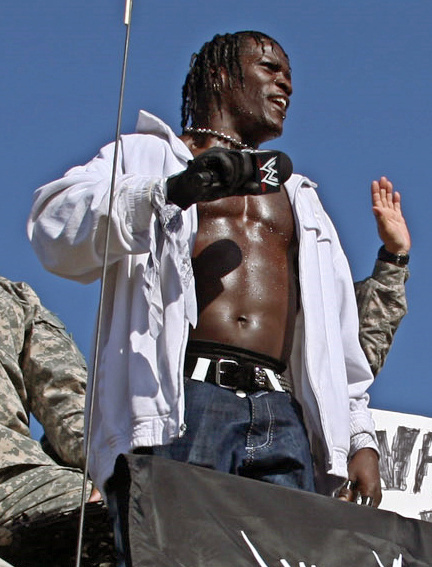
Ron Killings

- Uncertain debut date

- Matt Bloom
- Droz (wrestler)
- Evan Karagias
- Michael Cole
- Justin Gabriel
- Rene Dupree
- Billy Boy
- Lodi
- Chilly Willy
- Rob Feinstein
- Rie Tanabe (SPWF)

- January 26 – Tony Kozina
- February 7 – Ernest Miller
- March 10 – Dennis Rodman
- March 15 – Ron Killings
- April 12 - Naoya Ogawa
- May 7 – Danny Doring
- May 17 – Seiya Morohashi
- May 26 – Kazuki
- June 23 – Bill Goldberg
- July 6 – Shoichi Ichimiya
- July 13 – Chiharu
- August 2
  - Don Frye
  - Molly Holly
- September 5 – Perseus Jr. (IWA Japan)
- September 13 – Rocky Romero
- September 19 – Vinnie Massaro
- October 26 – Test
- November 21 – Nana Nakahara (All Japan Women's) and Noriko Toyoda (All Japan Women's)
- December 7 – Butterbean
- December 12 – Rikiya Fudo

== Births ==
- January 5 – Man Like DeReiss
- January 21 – Persia Pirotta
- January 23 – Kouki Amarei
- February 2 – Charli Evans
- February 6 – Salina de la Renta
- February 9 – Dan Moloney
- February 13 – Ren Ayabe
- February 18 – Xena
- February 28 – Ace Austin
- March 3 - Channing "Stacks" Lorenzo
- March 7 – Tyler Bate
- March 13 – Master Wato
- March 15 – Atticus Cogar
- March 18 – Josh Bishop
- March 20 – Ami Sohrei
- March 22 – Kid Lykos
- April 5 – Dominik Mysterio
- April 17 – Shota Umino
- April 24 - Gabe Kidd
- May 19
  - Saya Iida
  - Maxxine Dupri
- May 21 - Elton Prince
- May 28 – Himeka Arita
- June 1 – Black Warrior Jr. (d. 2022)
- June 5 – Gigi Dolin
- June 9 – Myron Reed
- June 16 - Jack Perry (wrestler)
- June 29 - Arianna Grace
- July 15 – Kohei Kinoshita
- July 18 – Alexxis Falcon
- July 21 – Levaniel
- July 27 - Tavion Heights
- August 2
  - Austin Theory
  - Mifu Ashida
- August 14 – Minorita
- August 25 – Cole Radrick
- September 3 – Hana Kimura (d. 2020)
- September 6 – Tsukushi Haruka
- September 16 – Yuuri
- September 29 – Hazuki
- October 24 – Bron Breakker
- October 26 - Tyson Dupont
- October 27 – Ishin Iihashi
- November 21 – Yuya Koroku
- December 4 – Itsuki Aoki
- December 18 – Himawari
- December 19 – Kurtis Chapman (d. 2023)

== Retirements ==
- Águila Solitaria (1978–1997)
- Bull Nakano (1983–1997)
- Denny Brown (1980–1997)
- Jeff Gaylord (1985–1997)
- Jimmy Del Ray (1985–1997)
- Jimmy Jack Funk (1980–1997)
- Ron Starr (1972-1997)
- Megumi Kudo (August 8, 1986 – April 29, 1997)
- Sivi Afi (1974–1997)
- Mike Sharpe (1973–1997)
- Tony Halme (1989- December 21, 1997)

== Deaths ==
- January 24 - Dr. Jerry Graham, 68
- February 4 - Ray Apollon, 72
- February 5 – Bulldog Bob Brown, 58
- February 28
  - Gorilla Marconi, 79
  - Larry Tillman, 88
- March 10 - Aldo Bogni, 82
- March 24 - Dr. Bill Miller, 69
- April 17 - Mitsu Arakawa, 69
- June 19 – Stan Stasiak, 60
- June 30 – Larry O'Dea, 53
- July 24 - Brian Glover, 63
- August 16 – Plum Mariko, 29
- August 18 – Robert Swenson, 40
- August 30 – Dale Lewis (wrestler), 64
- August 31 – Danno O'Shocker, 73
- September 10 – Fritz Von Erich, 68
- September 15 – Bulldog Brower, 63
- October 5 – Brian Pillman, 35
- November 12 – Luke Brown, 62
- December 2 - Shirley Crabtree, 67

== See also ==
- List of WCW pay-per-view events
- List of WWF pay-per-view events
- List of FMW supercards and pay-per-view events
- List of ECW supercards and pay-per-view events
