= WWF One Night Only =

1997 World Wrestling Federation pay-per-view event

One Night Only
- Promotional poster featuring various WWF wrestlers
- Promotion: World Wrestling Federation
- Date: September 20, 1997
- City: Birmingham, England
- Venue: NEC Arena
- Attendance: 11,000
- Buy rate: 20,000

Pay-per-view chronology
← Previous; Ground Zero: In Your House	Next → Badd Blood: In Your House

WWE in Europe chronology
← Previous —	Next → Mayhem in Manchester

One Night Only was a 1997 professional wrestling pay-per-view (PPV) event produced by the American promotion World Wrestling Federation (WWF, renamed WWE in 2002). It aired exclusively in Canada and the United Kingdom and took place on Saturday, September 20, 1997, at the NEC Arena in Birmingham, England. This was the WWF's second PPV event to be held in the United Kingdom, after the 1992 SummerSlam in London, England, but it was the first of the company's UK-exclusive PPVs as SummerSlam was broadcast worldwide.

The event featured eight matches, with two main events. In the first main event, The Undertaker challenged Bret Hart for the WWF Championship, which Hart retained. In the second main event match, which closed the show, Shawn Michaels defeated The British Bulldog to win the WWF European Championship.

During this time, the PPV market was relatively new to the UK, as before 1997, all PPV events were broadcast for free on Sky Sports. UK-exclusive PPVs were established as a means to promote this new delivery method, however, the events were booked and treated similarly to house shows.

== Production ==
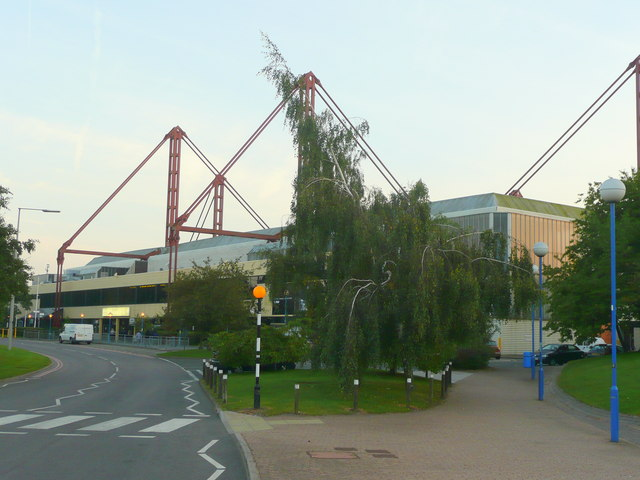
The event was held at the NEC Arena in Birmingham, England, which was the World Wrestling Federation's second pay-per-view event to be held in the United Kingdom, after the 1992 SummerSlam.

=== Background ===
In August 1992, the American professional wrestling promotion World Wrestling Federation (WWF, renamed WWE in 2002) held its annual SummerSlam event in London, England, which was the company's first-ever pay-per-view (PPV) event in the United Kingdom and it was broadcast worldwide. Five years later, the WWF scheduled a return to the country with a PPV event titled One Night Only to take place on Saturday, September 20, 1997, at the NEC Arena in Birmingham, England. The event aired exclusively in Canada and the United Kingdom, where for the latter, it aired exclusively on Sky Box Office and the show was heavily promoted. The PPV market was relatively new to the United Kingdom at the time, as before 1997, as all PPV events in the UK were broadcast for free on Sky Sports. One Night Only was held to serve as promotion for the new delivery method, however, it was booked and treated similarly to a house show.

=== Storylines ===
One Night Only featured professional wrestling matches involving different wrestlers from pre-existing scripted feuds, plots, and storylines that were played out on Raw Is War, and other WWF television programs.

The event featured eight matches, with two main events. In the first main event, The Undertaker challenged Bret Hart for the WWF Championship in a rematch from the previous month's SummerSlam event, where The Undertaker had lost the title through interference from special guest referee Shawn Michaels. This bout was not featured on the promotional poster for the event, which Hart resented, and attributed to the backstage politics of Shawn Michaels, and Hunter Hearst Helmsley; he said The Undertaker was similarly bemused by the omission (the match was also inexplicably removed from the North American VHS release, but included on the British VHS release, and the later DVD release on both sides of the Atlantic). To close the show, Michaels challenged The British Bulldog for the WWF European Championship, as part of his ongoing feud with The Hart Foundation. The WWF Tag Team Championship was also defended on the card, with Los Boricuas members Savio Vega and Miguel Pérez, Jr. challenging champions, The Headbangers.

The event was available on pay-per-view in Canada and Europe, but not in the United States: the storyline reason for this was that WWF Champion Bret Hart—then employing an Anti-American gimmick—had used a clause in his contract to block the event from being shown live in the US. It was subsequently released on home video there. In contrast to his hated heel status in the US, Bret Hart got mostly cheers from the British crowd in Birmingham, although his opponent The Undertaker got even more cheers. The British Bulldog got the biggest cheers of the night, while his opponent Shawn Michaels got most of the boos, and heel heat, especially after Michaels taunted the British crowd following the main event ending controversially.

== Reception ==
Fin Martin of professional wrestling magazine Power Slam described One Night Only as "a sensation", adding: "the card remains the WWF/WWE's best ever in-ring presentation on [UK] shores. The fireworks were provided by the last three matches, all of which were superb." He described Bret Hart vs. The Undertaker as "an epic encounter (over 28 minutes), which was the last truly great match of 'The Hitman's' career", and credited Michaels for having given "the heel performance of the year."

The WWF sold a full 11,000 tickets for the event. With restricted availability, the event, nonetheless, generated a 0.05 buy rate, equating to approximately 20,000 buys.

== Results ==
No.	Results	Stipulations	Times
1	Hunter Hearst Helmsley (with Chyna) defeated Dude Love	Singles match	12:51
2	Tiger Ali Singh (with Tiger Jeet Singh) defeated Leif Cassidy	Singles match	4:06
3	The Headbangers (Mosh and Thrasher) (c) defeated Los Boricuas (Miguel Pérez Jr. and Savio Vega)	Tag team match for the WWF Tag Team Championship	13:34
4	The Patriot defeated Flash Funk	Singles match	8:47
5	The Legion of Doom (Animal and Hawk) defeated The Godwinns (Henry O. Godwinn and Phineas I. Godwinn)	Tag team match	10:42
6	Vader defeated Owen Hart	Singles match	12:14
7	Bret Hart (c) defeated The Undertaker by disqualification	Singles match for the WWF Championship	28:34
8	Shawn Michaels (with Chyna, Hunter Hearst Helmsley, and Rick Rude) defeated The British Bulldog (c) (with Diana Hart-Smith) by technical submission	Singles match for the WWF European Championship	22:53
(c) / – the champion(s) heading into the match

== Other on-screen talent ==
Commentators

- Vince McMahon
- Jim Ross
- Jerry "The King" Lawler

Ring announcer

- Carsten Schaefer

Referees

- Mike Chioda
- Earl Hebner

== See also ==
- 1997 in professional wrestling
- Professional wrestling in the United Kingdom
