= November to Remember (1997) =

1997 Extreme Championship Wrestling pay-per-view event

- Promotion: Extreme Championship Wrestling
- Date: November 30, 1997
- City: Monaca, Pennsylvania
- Venue: Golden Dome
- Attendance: 4,634
- Buy rate: 70,000

Pay-per-view chronology
← Previous; Hardcore Heaven	Next → Living Dangerously

November to Remember chronology
← Previous; 1996	Next → 1998

The 1997 November to Remember was the fifth November to Remember professional wrestling event produced by Extreme Championship Wrestling (ECW) and the first edition of November to Remember to be broadcast on pay-per-view. The event took place on November 30, 1997 from the Golden Dome in Monaca, Pennsylvania.

Eight professional wrestling matches were contested at the event. In the main event, Shane Douglas defeated Bam Bam Bigelow to win the ECW World Heavyweight Championship. In the penultimate matches, Sabu defeated The Sandman in a Tables & Ladders match and Tommy Dreamer faced Rob Van Dam in a Flag match. Taz and The F.B.I. (Tracy Smothers and Little Guido) successfully defended the World Television Championship and the World Tag Team Championship respectively.

Rob Van Dam versus Tommy Dreamer was included on the 2005 WWE DVD release Rob Van Dam: One of a Kind. Shane Douglas versus Bam Bam Bigelow was included on the 2012 WWE DVD and Blu-ray release ECW Unreleased: Vol 1.

== Storylines ==
The event featured wrestlers from pre-existing scripted feuds and storylines. Wrestlers portrayed villains, heroes, or less distinguishable characters in the scripted events that built tension and culminated in a wrestling match or series of matches played out on ECW's television program Hardcore TV.

The main rivalry heading into the event was between Bam Bam Bigelow and Shane Douglas for the ECW World Heavyweight Championship. Rick Rude had been stalking Douglas and Francine since early 1997 and warned Douglas that he had been training a wrestler to take the title from Douglas. On the October 24 episode of Hardcore TV, Rude revealed Douglas' own Triple Threat teammate Bam Bam Bigelow as his handpicked man, who turned on Triple Threat and proceeded to defeat Douglas for the World Heavyweight Championship. Bigelow defeated Douglas to retain the title at Ultimate Jeopardy. Another rematch was signed between the two for the title at November to Remember.

At Barely Legal, Taz defeated Sabu and after the match, Rob Van Dam attacked Taz and Sabu joined RVD in the assault. As a result, both men turned heels and Taz's manager Bill Alfonso became the manager of RVD and Sabu. At Wrestlepalooza, RVD and Sabu turned on ECW by siding with Jerry Lawler in attacking Tommy Dreamer after Dreamer had beaten Raven in a loser leaves town match. This resulted in RVD and Sabu feuding with ECW wrestlers like Dreamer, Taz and The Sandman, which set up a flag match between Dreamer and RVD and a Tables & Ladders match between Sandman and Sabu at November to Remember.

== Event ==
Before the event aired live on pay-per-view, Chris Chetti and Spike Dudley defeated Erin O'Grady and Paul Diamond.

=== Preliminary matches ===
In the first match, Chris Candido took on Tommy Rogers. After a back and forth action between the two, Lance Storm interfered in the match on Candido's behalf and attacked Rogers and then Jerry Lynn ran in to make the save for Rogers. The referee continued the match as a tag team match pitting Lynn and Rogers against Candido and Storm. Candido hit a Northern Lights suplex to Rogers for the win.

Next, Mikey Whipwreck took on the undefeated Justin Credible. After a back and forth action, Jason attempted to interfere on Credible's behalf but Whipwreck countered his interference and nailed a Whippersnapper on Credible to hand Credible, his first loss in ECW.

In the following match, Taz defended the World Television Championship against Pitbull #2. Pitbull hit a Powerbomb and a spinning heel kick but Taz dominated him with a series of Taz-plexes and applied a Tazmission to retain the title. After the match, Pitbull #1 tried to attack Taz but Taz overpowered him and issued a challenge to Brakkus but a security guard prevented the confrontation and Taz attacked the guard.

The Full Blooded Italians (Tracy Smothers and Little Guido) defended the World Tag Team Championship against The Dudley Boyz (Buh Buh Ray Dudley and D-Von Dudley), The Hardcore Chair Swingin' Freaks (Balls Mahoney and Axl Rotten) and The Gangstanators (New Jack and Kronus) in a four-way dance. Guido shoved Kronus into a Buh Buh Cutter by Buh Buh, causing the elimination of Gangstanators. Mahoney blinded Buh Buh with a powder, who accidentally nailed the 3D to D-Von, allowing Rotten to pin him to eliminate Dudleys. Hardcore Chair Swingin' Freaks gained the advantage as Mahoney hit a Nutcracker Suite to Guido but the referee got knocked out in the process. Judge Jeff Jones came out as the replacement referee who counted to two and then began checking on the referee. Mahoney confronted Jones, who kicked him in the groin and then Guido pinned Mahoney with a roll-up to retain the title.

In the next match, Tommy Dreamer took on Rob Van Dam in a flag match, in which Dreamer represented ECW and RVD represented WWF. Several referees and wrestlers interfered in the match, resulting in the match being drawn out. Doug Furnas and Phil LaFon interfered on RVD's behalf but Dreamer managed to counter them until Stevie Richards hit a Stevie Kick to Dreamer and then RVD nailed a Five-Star Frog Splash to Dreamer and then he covered Dreamer for the pinfall while Furnas, LaFon and Richards counted to three.

The penultimate match of the event was a Tables & Ladders match between The Sandman and Sabu. After a back and forth action between the two, Bill Alfonso distracted Sandman, allowing Sabu to blow a fireball in Sandman's eyes but Sandman ducked it. Sabu managed to gain advantage by hitting a missile dropkick and then he drove Sandman through a table outside the ring with a diving splash from the top of a ladder. Sabu rolled Sandman into the ring and nailed an Arabian Facebuster for the victory. This is also the notorious ACID MATCH!, Here Lizard, Lizard, Lizard. Which Sandman was high on acid through the whole match.

=== Main event match ===
The main event saw Bam Bam Bigelow defend the World Heavyweight Championship against Shane Douglas. Bigelow dominated Douglas throughout the match by using his strength and size advantage until Douglas drove him through a table with a Powerbomb. Douglas tried to dive onto Bigelow but Bigelow drove him through a table with a Powerbomb. Bigelow then hit a Powerbomb but got a near-fall. Bigelow continued his control until Douglas' Triple Threat teammates Chris Candido and Lance Storm interfered in the match but Bigelow tossed Douglas onto them. Francine's interference backfired as well. Douglas eventually hit a belly-to-belly suplex but could not cover him in time and Bigelow then splashed Douglas in the corner. Bigelow tried to execute a Powerbomb through a table but Douglas countered it into a belly-to-belly suplex through the table to win the title.

== Reception ==
November to Remember received mixed retrospective reviews from critics.

In 2011, David of Wrestling Recaps wrote "Things were rolling along decently and a good main event would have made this a recommendable show. I’ll go with a thumbs in the middle for November To Remember ‘97."

In 2011, Alexander Settee of The History of WWE appreciated the event by stating " The undercard here was ok, led by the first two matches being pretty good. From there it kind of fell apart, as the Tag Title match was a mess, RVD/Dreamer had so much going on and no real ending and then we had Sabu/Sandman. If you like the idea of watching guys sloppily hit each other with ladders and go through tables for twenty minutes, then this was your match, but as far as I'm concerned it just sucked. But then the show was saved by that great main event, which I think is absolutely worth tracking down if you haven't seen it. So as bad as Sabu/Sandman was, I still think there's enough good here to call it a Thumbs Up for November to Remember 1997."

In 2014, TJ Hawke of 411Mania gave it a score rating of 2.5 [Very Bad], stating, "This was another awful PPV from ECW. The unintentional comedy of the Sabu/Sandman match absolutely made this whole show worth watching."

In 2017, Brock Allen of Wrestling DVD Network stated "It’s not a terrible show by any means but it’s no classic either. It appeased the PPV providers, still looking for any reason to boot ECW, and sent the local crowd home happy. But for ECW fans around the country this was seen as a letdown. The opener is worth watching and so is the chaos of the “flag match”, but everything else is average, for ECW, at best. As always, if you haven’t seen it it’s worth sitting through at least once."

In 2018, Wrestling 20 Years Ago staff rated it 5 out of 10 and recommended the final two matches of the event watchable.

According to Wrestling Revolution staff, "this was a great show from ECW if you fast-forward through the dreck in the middle."

== Aftermath ==
Mikey Whipwreck continued his feud with Justin Credible after November to Remember as Whipwreck defeated Credible in a rematch at Better Than Ever. Full Blooded Italians dropped the World Tag Team Championship to Chris Candido and Lance Storm in a three-way Dance also involving Hardcore Chair Swingin' Freaks.

After losing the World Heavyweight Championship, Bam Bam Bigelow continued his feud with Triple Threat, which had gained Lance Storm as the third member in place of Bigelow. At Hostile City Showdown on January 31, 1998, Bigelow turned on his tag team partner Taz in a handicap match against Shane Douglas, Chris Candido and Lance Storm, thus re-joining Triple Threat while Storm was kicked out of the group.

Sabu and Sandman continued their feud after November to Remember as the two competed in a Stairway to Hell match at House Party.

== Results ==
No.	Results	Stipulations	Times
1^{D}	Chris Chetti and Spike Dudley defeated Erin O'Grady and Paul Diamond	Tag team match	—
2	Chris Candido vs. Tommy Rogers ended in no contest	Singles match	13:20
3	Chris Candido and Lance Storm defeated Tommy Rogers and Jerry Lynn	Tag team match	3:23
4	Mikey Whipwreck defeated Justin Credible (with Jason)	Singles match	7:15
5	Taz (c) defeated Pitbull #2 (with Pitbull #1, Brakkus and Lance Wright) by submission	Singles match for the ECW World Television Championship	1:29
6	The F.B.I. (Tracy Smothers and Little Guido) (c) (with Tommy Rich) defeated The Dudley Boyz (Buh Buh Ray and D-Von) (with Big Dick Dudley, Sign Guy Dudley and Joel Gertner), The Hardcore Chair Swingin' Freaks (Balls Mahoney and Axl Rotten) and The Gangstanators (New Jack and Kronus)	Four-Way Dance for the ECW World Tag Team Championship	14:32
7	Rob Van Dam (with Bill Alfonso) vs. Tommy Dreamer (with Beulah McGillicutty) ended in a no-contest	Flag match	16:02
8	Sabu (with Bill Alfonso) defeated The Sandman	Tables & Ladders match	20:55
9	Shane Douglas (with Francine) defeated Bam Bam Bigelow (c)	Singles match for the ECW World Heavyweight Championship	25:02
(c) / – the champion(s) heading into the match; D / – this was a dark match

=== Four-Way Dance eliminations ===
Elimination no.	Wrestler	Team	Eliminated by	Elimination move	Time
1	Kronus	The Gangstanators	Buh Buh Ray Dudley	Buh Buh Cutter	10:04
2	D-Von Dudley	Dudley Boyz	Axl Rotten	3D by Buh Buh Ray Dudley	12:27
3	Balls Mahoney	Hardcore Chair Swingin' Freaks	Little Guido	Roll-up after a low blow by Jeff Jones	14:32
Winners:	The F.B.I. (c)				

== See also ==
- 1997 in professional wrestling
