= Badd Blood: In Your House =

1997 World Wrestling Federation pay-per-view event

- Promotional poster featuring The Undertaker
- Promotion: World Wrestling Federation
- Date: October 5, 1997
- City: St. Louis, Missouri
- Venue: Kiel Center
- Attendance: 21,151
- Buy rate: 240,000

Pay-per-view chronology
← Previous; One Night Only	Next → Survivor Series

In Your House chronology
← Previous; Ground Zero	Next → D-Generation X

Bad Blood chronology
← Previous; First	Next → 2003

Badd Blood: In Your House was a 1997 professional wrestling pay-per-view (PPV) event produced by the World Wrestling Federation (WWF, renamed WWE in 2002). It was the 18th In Your House, and inaugural Bad Blood, and took place on October 5, 1997, at the Kiel Center in St. Louis, Missouri. The name of the event was a reference to the rivalry between The Undertaker and Shawn Michaels. This was the final PPV event of the New Generation Era, as the company would debut its "Attitude" branding the following month at Survivor Series.

Seven matches were contested at the event. The event was notable as it featured the promotion's first-ever Hell in a Cell match. This was the main event which pitted The Undertaker against Shawn Michaels and saw the debut of Undertaker's storyline brother Kane, who interfered in the match by hitting the "Tombstone Piledriver" on Undertaker, which allowed Michaels to win and become the number one contender for the WWF Championship against reigning champion Bret Hart at Survivor Series. The show would also mark the last time Vince McMahon was featured as the chief broadcaster of the commentating team for a PPV event and started his career as an on-screen professional wrestler using a gimmick known by the ring name Mr. McMahon, based on his real-life persona. The show's theme song was also the first theme song of former WWF wrestler Steve Blackman.

This was one of the In Your House events which later became the title of an annual PPV, replacing the method at the time of making new names for all events aside from the "Big Five" (Royal Rumble, WrestleMania, King of the Ring, SummerSlam, and Survivor Series). Unlike the other former In Your House events that also became PPVs after In Your House's discontinuation in early 1999, Bad Blood (stylized with one "d" in "Bad") did not return until June 2003, becoming the annual June PPV; however, it was short-lived as the event was discontinued after the 2004 event, but was later held once again in 2024 for the 27th anniversary of this first event.

== Production ==
=== Background ===
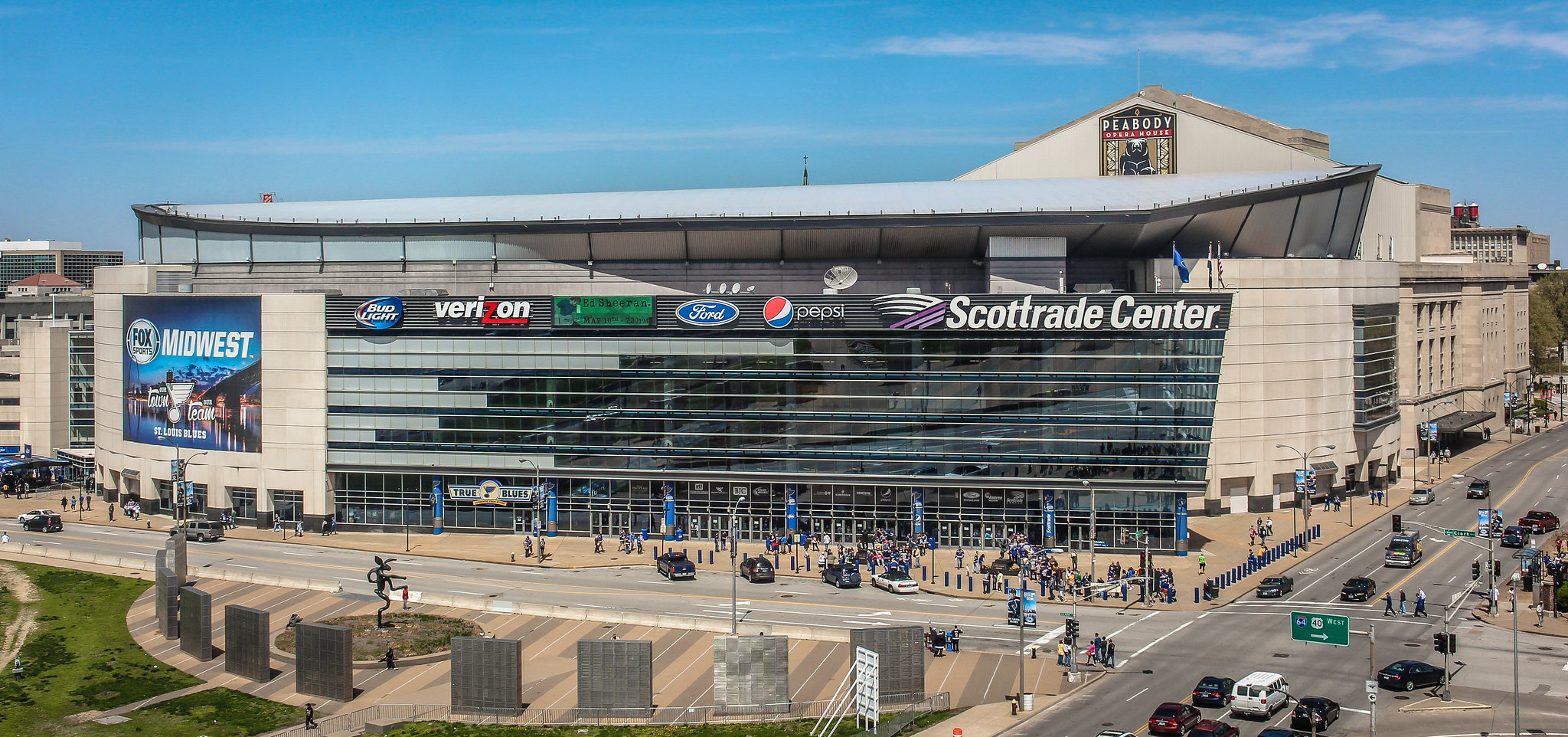
The 18th In Your House was held in St. Louis, Missouri at the Kiel Center (pictured in 2015 after it had since been renamed as Scottrade Center).

In Your House was a series of monthly professional wrestling pay-per-view (PPV) events first produced by the World Wrestling Federation (WWF, renamed WWE in 2002) in May 1995. They aired when the promotion was not holding one of its then-five major PPVs (WrestleMania, King of the Ring, SummerSlam, Survivor Series, and Royal Rumble) and were sold at a lower cost. The 18th In Your House, titled Badd Blood: In Your House, was scheduled for October 5, 1997, at the Kiel Center in St. Louis, Missouri. The name of the event was a reference to the rivalry between The Undertaker and Shawn Michaels.

=== Storylines ===
The main feud heading into Badd Blood involved The Undertaker and Shawn Michaels. The rivalry dated back to August at SummerSlam, when Michaels served as special guest referee for the WWF Championship match between The Undertaker, and Bret Hart. Michaels tried to hit Hart with a chair, but accidentally struck Undertaker instead, causing Hart to win the match and the title. After a previous match between Undertaker and Michaels to determine a number one contender for the WWF Championship ended in a double Disqualification at Ground Zero: In Your House, a cage match called a Hell in a Cell match was scheduled for Badd Blood, which would be the first-ever Hell in a Cell match held by the WWF.

Undertaker's former manager, Paul Bearer, had his face burned by a fireball thrown by Undertaker at In Your House 14: Revenge of the 'Taker; Bearer compared the incident to a fire that burned down the funeral home that killed The Undertaker's parents and possibly his younger half-brother; for which he blamed The Undertaker, but Undertaker denied it. Bearer claimed to have proof in the form of Undertaker's half-brother Kane, who was alive after all. Bearer revealed that he had raised Kane after the fire and that Kane now was coming to the WWF to challenge Undertaker.

On the afternoon of the event, Brian Pillman, who was scheduled to face Dude Love on the show, was found dead in his hotel room. The announcement was made to fans during the half-hour "pregame show" before the pay-per-view was broadcast.

== Event ==
Other on-screen personnel
Role:	Name:
English commentators	Vince McMahon
English commentators	Jim Ross
English commentators	Jerry Lawler
Spanish commentators	Carlos Cabrera
Spanish commentators	Tito Santana
French commentators	Raymond Rougeau
French commentators	Jean Brassard
Interviewers	Michael Cole
Interviewers	Dok Hendrix
Ring announcer	Howard Finkel
Referees	Tim White
Referees	Jim Korderas
Referees	Earl Hebner
Referees	Mike Chioda

At the top of the show, as the Nation of Domination were preparing for their match, Vince McMahon mentioned, as had already been announced on the Free For All pre-show, that Brian Pillman died earlier that day (October 5, 1997). Also, this was the last pay-per-view event that McMahon called in his position as the WWF's chief broadcaster, as he left the broadcast team altogether following the events of the next month, and started his career as an on-screen professional wrestler using a gimmick known by the ring name Mr. McMahon, based on his real-life persona.

The event started with the Nation of Domination taking on The Legion of Doom in what was supposed to be a six-man tag team match. However, Ken Shamrock (who was supposed to be Hawk & Animal's partner) was out due to injury. Faarooq interfered on behalf of his Nation teammates, which enabled Kama Mustafa to kick Hawk in the back of the head, and Rocky Maivia to execute the Rock Bottom for the pin.

Due to Pillman's death, his match with Dude Love was canceled, and two matches had to be added to the card at the last minute to fill out the time. The first of those was a midget wrestling tag team match pitting Max Mini, and Nova against Tarantula, and Mosaic; Max Mini, and Nova emerged victorious when Mini pinned Tarantula despite a kick out at 2.

The Headbangers then defended their WWF Tag Team Championships against The Godwinns. Late in the match, Phineas caught Mosh attempting the Mosh Pit, and power bombed him for the pin while Uncle Cletus held Thrasher to prevent him from making the save. After the contest was over, the new champions assaulted the old champions, only stopping when threatened with losing the belts.

A Legends Ceremony was held next to honor some of the legends of St. Louis wrestling. It was hosted by Jim Ross, and Sunny. Wrestlers honored included Gene Kiniski, Jack Brisco, Dory Funk Jr., Harley Race, Terry Funk, Lou Thesz, and promoter Sam Muchnick.

The next match saw the finals of the Intercontinental Championship Tournament, where Owen Hart faced Faarooq for the belt that "Stone Cold" Steve Austin was forced to vacate due to an injury he suffered at SummerSlam in August. Austin was at ringside for the contest, as he was to present the belt to the winner. Austin also served as guest timekeeper, and guest commentator, and factored in the outcome as he hit Faarooq with the belt to knock him out while Commissioner Slaughter, who was also at ringside to prevent any incidents, was distracted. Hart then pinned Faarooq to win the Intercontinental title.

The second of two matches necessitated by the cancellation of Pillman's match was an eight man tag team contest pitting the Disciples of Apocalypse against Los Boricuas. DOA won the match after Crush pinned Jesús Castillo following a tilt-a-whirl backbreaker.

WWF Champion Bret Hart, and The British Bulldog took on Vader, and The Patriot in a tag-team match that followed the eight-man tag. Originally scheduled to be a capture-the-flag match, where the object was to go to the opponent's corner, and grab their country's flag (Canada's or America's) to win, this was changed to allow for pinfalls, and submissions; due to all four competitors entering the match with injuries. The change enabled Hart to roll up The Patriot and pin him for the victory. After the match, both members of the American team assaulted their opponents. The match is notable for having two fans interfere by attempting to climb into the ring.

The main event of the evening saw Shawn Michaels face off against The Undertaker in the first ever Hell in a Cell match, with the winner to face Hart for the WWF Championship at Survivor Series in November. Michaels was initially accompanied to the ring by Triple H, Chyna, and Rick Rude, his cohorts in D-Generation X, but after the cage was locked, all three of Michaels' allies were forced to leave the ring. Undertaker attacked Michaels early and often, and his opponent was unable to gain offense early in the match. Approximately halfway through the match, a cameraman was (kayfabe) injured, forcing the cell door to unlock. Michaels and Undertaker fought outside of the cell; Michaels was then thrown face-first into the cage, causing him to begin bleeding profusely. The two climbed to the top of the cell and fought, ending with Michaels hanging from the side of the cell while Undertaker stomped on his hands, causing Michaels to fall through the Spanish broadcast table. The two then returned to the inside of the cell, where the door was once again locked. Late in the match, Undertaker hit Michaels with a chair. As Michaels lay unconscious, Undertaker gestured, but as he was doing this, all of the lights in the arena went out and organ music began to play. Within seconds, a red light filled the arena and Paul Bearer walked to the ring with the debuting Kane. Kane proceeded to rip the door of the cell off its hinges, assault referee Earl Hebner, and enter the ring. He then turned the lights in the arena back on with his soon-to-be trademark gesture of summoning fire from the corners and executed the Tombstone Piledriver on the Undertaker before exiting the cell. Michaels then crawled over to the Undertaker while referee Earl Hebner, who had also been taken out, slowly crawled back into the ring. Michaels pinned Undertaker for the victory.

== Reception ==
The main event was given a 5-star match rating by Dave Meltzer, which would be the last WWF/WWE match to receive the honor until the John Cena vs. CM Punk match at the 2011 Money in the Bank event. The next time a Hell in a Cell match would get a five-star rating would occur nearly 25 years later in a match between Cody Rhodes, and Seth Rollins, with a third coming on the 27-year anniversary of this event, in a match between CM Punk and Drew McIntyre. The pay-per-view received a 0.60 buyrate, equivalent to approximately 240,000 buys.

In 2015, Kevin Pantoja of 411Mania gave the event a rating of 5.0 [Not So Good], stating, "The show itself was pretty damn boring until the end. Besides the main event, only two matches earn two stars and they barely accomplish that. This may be because of the emotions after one [of] their colleagues passed away, but everyone, outside of the Cell match, seemed to kind of mail it in. Speaking of the Cell, it is the only reason you should go see this and saves this from being a terrible score. It is one of the greatest matches of all time".

== Aftermath ==
For the next several weeks leading up to Survivor Series, D-Generation X, and the Hart Foundation engaged in a battle that largely centered around Bret Hart being from Canada. Michaels took opportunities to deface the Canadian flag quite often, including in their match at the event. As for the match itself, the controversial ending lives on in professional wrestling history as the Montreal Screwjob. Hart left the World Wrestling Federation (WWF) afterward for the rival promotion World Championship Wrestling (WCW).

Austin and Owen Hart resumed their feud that had been interrupted after SummerSlam due to his injury. Austin made it a point to interfere in every single one of Hart's title defenses to ensure that Owen would keep the title until Survivor Series, where he planned to take it from him. Austin did exactly that and kept the championship for most of the remainder of the year.

The Patriot disappeared from the WWF after Badd Blood due to injuries, but Vader continued to wrestle and was part of an eight-man tag match at Survivor Series, where he was pinned by Davey Boy Smith. He then entered a feud with Goldust, which lasted until the Royal Rumble.

Ken Shamrock returned from his injuries shortly after Badd Blood and set his sights on the WWF World Heavyweight Championship. He got an opportunity at D-Generation X: In Your House when he faced off against Michaels, winning the match via disqualification. He resumed his ongoing feud with the Nation of Domination after that, specifically targeting Rocky Maivia (who by this time was known as The Rock).

The Godwinns lost their tag team championships to the Legion of Doom on the October 13 episode of Raw Is War aired eight days after Badd Blood. Shortly thereafter, the team began to move down the card, and was eventually broken up and repackaged. The Headbangers returned to contending for the WWF Tag Team Championships for a brief period before challenging for the NWA World Tag Team Championship when that title began appearing on WWF programming as part of the WWF's NWA invasion angle. Mosh and Thrasher beat The Rock 'n' Roll Express for the titles in February 1998 and lost to Bob Holly and Bart Gunn, a repackaged version of The Midnight Express, the following month.

Kane won his debut match against Mankind at Survivor Series and entered various feuds with other wrestlers, intending to eventually bring his brother The Undertaker into the ring with him. For months and months, Undertaker staunchly refused to face Kane, not wanting to fight his brother. Undertaker then returned to pay-per-view action at D-Generation X: In Your House by losing to Jeff Jarrett via disqualification, after Kane, who initially appeared to help Jarrett instead chokeslammed him, giving Jarrett the victory by disqualification. Undertaker's feud with Michaels continued until the Royal Rumble next year. He faced Michaels one final time at the Royal Rumble in January 1998, in a casket match for the WWF Championship. Undertaker lost the match after Kane and Paul Bearer, who came to the ring and looked like they were going to help Undertaker, instead assaulted him and locked him in the casket themselves to give Michaels the victory. After the match was over, Kane struck the still-locked casket with an axe, then poured gasoline all over it and set it on fire. This was enough for Undertaker to finally agree to wrestle his brother, and the two began feuding with a match at WrestleMania XIV, which Undertaker won after three tombstone piledrivers.

The In Your House branding was retired following February 1999's St. Valentine's Day Massacre: In Your House event, as the company moved to install permanent names for each of its monthly PPVs, but was revived in 2020 as part of the NXT-branded TakeOver series. After six years and after the promotion had been renamed to World Wrestling Entertainment (WWE) in early 2002, Bad Blood (now stylized with a single "d" in "Bad") returned in 2003 as its own PPV event and was made exclusive to wrestlers of the Raw brand, a storyline subdivision called the brand extension in which the promotion divided its roster into two separate brands, Raw and SmackDown!, where wrestlers were exclusively assigned to perform. It would be a short-lived PPV, however, as Bad Blood was discontinued after the 2004 event, which was also Raw-exclusive. Bad Blood was going to be revived in July 2017, but these plans were scrapped in favor of an event titled Great Balls of Fire. After 20 years since the final event in 2004, Bad Blood was held once more in 2024 on the 27th anniversary of the inaugural event. Badd Blood: In Your House was notable for introducing the Hell in a Cell match, which was featured as the main event match for the Bad Blood events in 2003 and 2004 and would become the basis of the Hell in a Cell PPV that was held annually from 2009 to 2022. The 2024 Bad Blood also featured the Hell in a Cell match, but unlike the prior three Bad Blood events, the Hell in a Cell match opened the show.

== Results ==
No.	Results	Stipulations	Times
1	Nation of Domination (D'Lo Brown, Kama Mustafa, and Rocky Maivia) defeated The Legion of Doom (Animal and Hawk) by pinfall	3-on-2 Handicap match	12:20
2	Max Mini and Nova defeated Mosaic and Tarantula by pinfall	Tag team match	6:43
3	The Godwinns (Henry O. Godwinn and Phineas I. Godwinn) (with Uncle Cletus) defeated The Headbangers (Mosh and Thrasher) (c) by pinfall	Tag team match for the WWF Tag Team Championship	12:18
4	Owen Hart defeated Faarooq by pinfall	Singles match for the vacant WWF Intercontinental Championship	7:16
5	Disciples of Apocalypse (8-Ball, Chainz, Crush, and Skull) defeated Los Boricuas (Jesús Castillo Jr., José Estrada Jr., Miguel Pérez Jr., and Savio Vega) by pinfall	Eight-man tag team match	9:11
6	Bret Hart and The British Bulldog defeated The Patriot and Vader	Flag match	23:13
7	Shawn Michaels defeated The Undertaker by pinfall	Hell in a Cell match to determine the #1 contender to the WWF Championship at Survivor Series	30:00
(c) / – the champion(s) heading into the match

=== WWF Intercontinental Championship Tournament bracket ===
Quarterfinals; Raw Is War; September 8–22, 1997 (Aired: September 15)
Brian Pillman	Disqualification
Dude Love	4:47
Owen Hart	Disqualification
Goldust	2:09
Faarooq	2:42
Ken Shamrock	Pinfall (Note: Ken Shamrock initially won the match, but he suffered an injury so Faarooq advanced.)
Ahmed Johnson	Pinfall
Rocky Maivia	4:56

Semifinals; Raw Is War; September 22–23, 1997 (Aired: September 29)
Brian Pillman	7:12
Owen Hart	Disqualification
Faarooq	Disqualification
Ahmed Johnson	2:29

Final; Badd Blood: In Your House; October 5, 1997
Owen Hart	Pinfall
Faarooq	7:12
