= Ground Zero: In Your House =

1997 World Wrestling Federation pay-per-view event

- Promotional poster featuring "Stone Cold" Steve Austin
- Promotion: World Wrestling Federation
- Date: September 7, 1997
- City: Louisville, Kentucky
- Venue: Louisville Gardens
- Attendance: 4,963
- Buy rate: 136,000
- Tagline: That's the Bottom Line...

Pay-per-view chronology
← Previous; SummerSlam	Next → One Night Only

In Your House chronology
← Previous; Canadian Stampede	Next → Badd Blood

Ground Zero: In Your House was a 1997 professional wrestling pay-per-view (PPV) event produced by the World Wrestling Federation (WWF, renamed WWE in 2002). It was the 17th In Your House and took place on September 7, 1997, at Louisville Gardens in Louisville, Kentucky. This was the second In Your House at the venue, after In Your House 6 in February 1996. The name of the event was a reference to featuring the first-ever singles match between Shawn Michaels and The Undertaker.

This was the first three-hour In Your House pay-per-view, the first to use the "In Your House" moniker as the subtitle rather than the main title, and the first in which the title did not carry the event's installment number. This was also the last event in which the entrance staging was shaped like a suburban home, in favor of unique sets based around the name of the PPV going forward.

Seven professional wrestling matches were contested at the event. The main event saw Shawn Michaels and The Undertaker wrestle to a no contest. Also on the card, Bret Hart defeated The Patriot to retain the WWF Championship, The Headbangers (Mosh and Thrasher) won the vacant WWF Tag Team Championship in a Four-Way Tag Team Elimination match, and Brian Pillman defeated Goldust. Due to prior stipulations, Goldust's manager/wife (storyline and real-life) Marlena was required to become Pillman's assistant for 30 days.

== Production ==
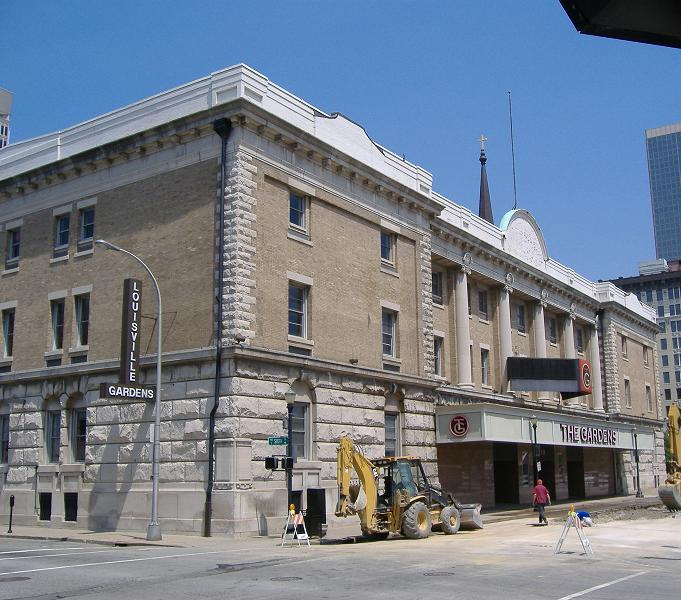
The 17th In Your House was the second time for the event to be held at the Louisville Gardens in Louisville, Kentucky, after In Your House 6 in February 1996.

=== Background ===
In Your House was a series of monthly professional wrestling pay-per-view (PPV) events first produced by the World Wrestling Federation (WWF, renamed WWE in 2002) in May 1995. They aired when the promotion was not holding one of its then-five major PPVs (WrestleMania, King of the Ring, SummerSlam, Survivor Series, and Royal Rumble) and were sold at a lower cost. The 17th In Your House, titled as Ground Zero: In Your House, was scheduled for September 7, 1997, at the Louisville Gardens in Louisville, Kentucky. The name of the event was a reference to featuring the first-ever singles match between Shawn Michaels and The Undertaker.

This marked the second In Your House to be held at Louisville Gardens, after In Your House 6 in February 1996. It was the first In Your House in which "In Your House" was the subtitle instead of the main title and it was also the first in which the title did not carry the event's installment number. It was also the first In Your House to broadcast for three hours, which was previously a runtime reserved for the Big Five.

=== Storylines ===
Ground Zero: In Your House consisted of professional wrestling matches involving different wrestlers from pre-existing scripted feuds, plots and storylines that were played out on Raw Is War and other WWF television programs.

The main rivalry heading into the event involved The Undertaker and Shawn Michaels. While guest refereeing the WWF Championship match between Bret Hart and The Undertaker at SummerSlam, Michaels attempted to hit Hart over the head with a steel chair after Hart had spit in his face. Bret ducked and Michaels hit Undertaker, knocking him out. Bret covered Undertaker as Michaels appeared reluctant, but made the three count causing the Undertaker to lose the title. Michaels had stated that the chair shot was unintentional, though some did not believe him. On the August 18 edition of Raw Is War, however, Shawn deliberately struck Undertaker over the head multiple times with a chair during a tag team match. The shots failed to keep him down and, with blood covering his head, tried to go after Michaels but he quickly retreated towards the locker room. Michaels continued to cause problems for Undertaker by interfering in his match against Hunter Hearst Helmsley on the September 5 episode of Friday Night's Main Event.

Another feud involved The Patriot and WWF Champion, Bret Hart. In response to the reformation of The Hart Foundation (this time as an anti-American stable), The Patriot debuted on the July 14 edition of Raw Is War to stand up against Hart and defend America. The Patriot pulled off a surprise win against Bret Hart on the July 28 episode of Raw in a match which Shawn Michaels distracted Hart from ringside while doing guest commentary. On the following Raw Is War, Sgt. Slaughter was introduced as the new Commissioner of the WWF and ordered Hart to defend the WWF Championship against The Patriot at Ground Zero: In Your House. Both Hart and The Patriot brawled later that night. The next week, Hart attacked the Patriot after he won a tag match with Ken Shamrock against Hart's brother Owen and brother-in-law Davey Boy Smith. Hart continued with the attacks the next week after the Patriot defeated Vader, but Vader stopped Hart. On a special Friday night edition of Raw the next week, Vader and Hart fought for the title, and as the Hart Foundation attacked Vader, The Patriot ran out for the save. On the September 5 episode of Friday Night's Main Event, The Patriot defeated Owen Hart by disqualification after Bret and Bulldog interfered, making Vader run out for the save.

Another rivalry heading into the event involved Brian Pillman and Goldust. Goldust had defeated Pillman at SummerSlam, and as a result, Pillman was forced to wear Marlena's dress until he won a match. Pillman continued to take verbal shots at Goldust, who in turn interfered in several of Pillman's matches and ensured that Pillman kept on losing and had to wear the dress. An angered and embarrassed Pillman challenged Goldust to one more match. Goldust declined but Marlena accepted the challenge on his behalf. The match stipulated that Pillman would have to leave the WWF, should he lose, but would gain Marlena as a personal assistant for 30 days, should he win.

== Event ==
=== Preliminary matches ===
Other on-screen personnel
Role:	Name:
English commentators	Vince McMahon
English commentators	Jim Ross
English commentators	Jerry Lawler
Spanish commentators	Carlos Cabrera
Spanish commentators	Tito Santana
French commentators	Ray Rougeau
French commentators	Jean Brassard
Interviewer	Dok Hendrix
Interviewer	Michael Cole
Interviewer	Sunny
Ring announcer	Howard Finkel
Referee	Earl Hebner
Referee	Jack Doan
Referee	Mike Chioda
Referee	Tim White

The first match of the pay-per-view was an "Indecent Proposal" match between Goldust (with Marlena), and Brian Pillman. If Goldust won, Pillman would have to leave the WWF. If Pillman won, Marlena would become his assistant for 30 days. About 10 minutes into the match, Goldust performed his finishing move, the Curtain Call, but Pillman's arm flung to the side during the move, which knocked down the referee. Goldust realized the referee was out and tried to revive him. Meanwhile, Marlena got up on the ring apron as Pillman regained his senses and approached her. Marlena attempted to hit Pillman with her purse but he blocked it, snatched it from her hands, and smacked Goldust in the head with it, temporarily knocking him out. The referee recovered as Pillman scored the pinfall. After the match, Pillman grabbed Marlena and escorted her towards the locker room. Color commentator Jerry Lawler got up from his chair and walked over to the ring to retrieve Marlena's purse, which he opened up to reveal a brick inside. As Goldust made his way backstage, Pillman was shown shoving Marlena into a car and speeding off just before Goldust could reach them.

In the second match, Scott Putski faced off against Brian Christopher. A few minutes into the match, Christopher tossed Putski through the ropes to the outside of the ring. He then performed a diving crossbody but Putski injured his left knee when Christopher landed on him. Brian got back in the ring as the referee began a 10-count on Putski. Once the referee realized Putski would not make it back inside the ring in time, he went out to check on him and then stopped the match due to the injury and awarded the win to Christopher.

The third match of the night was a Triple Threat match pitting Savio Vega (representing Los Boricuas), Faarooq (representing Nation of Domination) and Crush (representing Disciples of Apocalypse) against each other. At about the eleven-minute mark, Crush clotheslined Vega over the top rope, then turned his attention to Faarooq by performing a Heart Punch to him. Before he could make the pin, Vega appeared behind Crush and delivered a spinning heel kick to the side of his head. While Faarooq was still suffering the effects of the punch, Vega covered Crush for the pinfall victory.

The fourth match of the event was a midget match pitting Max Mini against El Torito. After controlling the majority of the match, El Torito was pinned at about the nine-minute mark with a sunset flip performed by Max Mini.

Next, in preparation for the WWF Tag Team Championship match, Dude Love and "Stone Cold" Steve Austin forfeited the title. Jim Ross was in the ring to interview the WWF Commissioner Sgt. Slaughter, who was to receive the belts. Dude Love handed his title belt to Slaughter first, commenting that he had considered defending the titles alone, but decided against it because had it not been for Austin, he would not have had the championship to begin with. Austin, upset because he was not allowed to wrestle, threw his belt at Slaughter's feet, and protested the decision. When Jim Ross responded that he wished Austin could wrestle too, but felt the WWF was making the right decision for Austin's safety, he received a Stone Cold Stunner from Austin. This prevented Ross from returning to the broadcast table for the rest of the evening.

The fifth match of the event was a Four-Way Tag Team Elimination match for the vacant WWF Tag Team Championship. The participating teams were The Headbangers (Mosh and Thrasher), and former champions The Godwinns (Henry O. Godwinn and Phineas I. Godwinn), Legion of Doom (Hawk and Animal) and Owen Hart and The British Bulldog. Legion of Doom was the first to be eliminated after being disqualified for attacking The Godwinns with their own slop bucket. The Godwinns were the second team eliminated when Thrasher pinned Phineas with a sunset flip. After the elimination, Owen Hart began to apply the sharpshooter to Mosh while the referee was busy attending to the skirmish on the outside of the ring between Bulldog and Thrasher. At this time, Stone Cold Steve Austin rushed to the ring as Mosh kicked Hart off before he could turn him over to fully apply the hold. This spun Owen around, right into the hands of Austin who performed a Stone Cold Stunner on him. Austin slid out as the referee refocused his attention to the ring and made the three count as Mosh pinned Hart to win the titles for the first and only time.

=== Main event matches ===
In the sixth match, Bret Hart defended the WWF Championship against The Patriot. Hart immediately attacked The Patriot as the bell sounded. The two traded punches until Bret gained the advantage in the match for a few minutes. The Patriot turned the tide, but only for a few minutes also, until the British Bulldog appeared at ringside. Bulldog attempted to trip The Patriot by reaching for his ankle from underneath the bottom rope but failed. A short time later, Bulldog interrupted a pinfall attempt by The Patriot, prompting Vader to emerge and attack Bulldog. Bret tried to help but Vader threw him into the ring steps and then tossed him in the ring. Vader was then escorted back to the locker room as the referee let the match continue. In the end, The Patriot applied the sharpshooter on Bret, who powered out of it and locked in his sharpshooter, forcing The Patriot to submit to win the match. After the match, Bret grabbed the American flag The Patriot had brought to the ring, ripped it off its pole, and began to choke him with it. Bret finally left the ring after assaulting one of the WWF officials (Pat Patterson) who were trying to stop the attack.

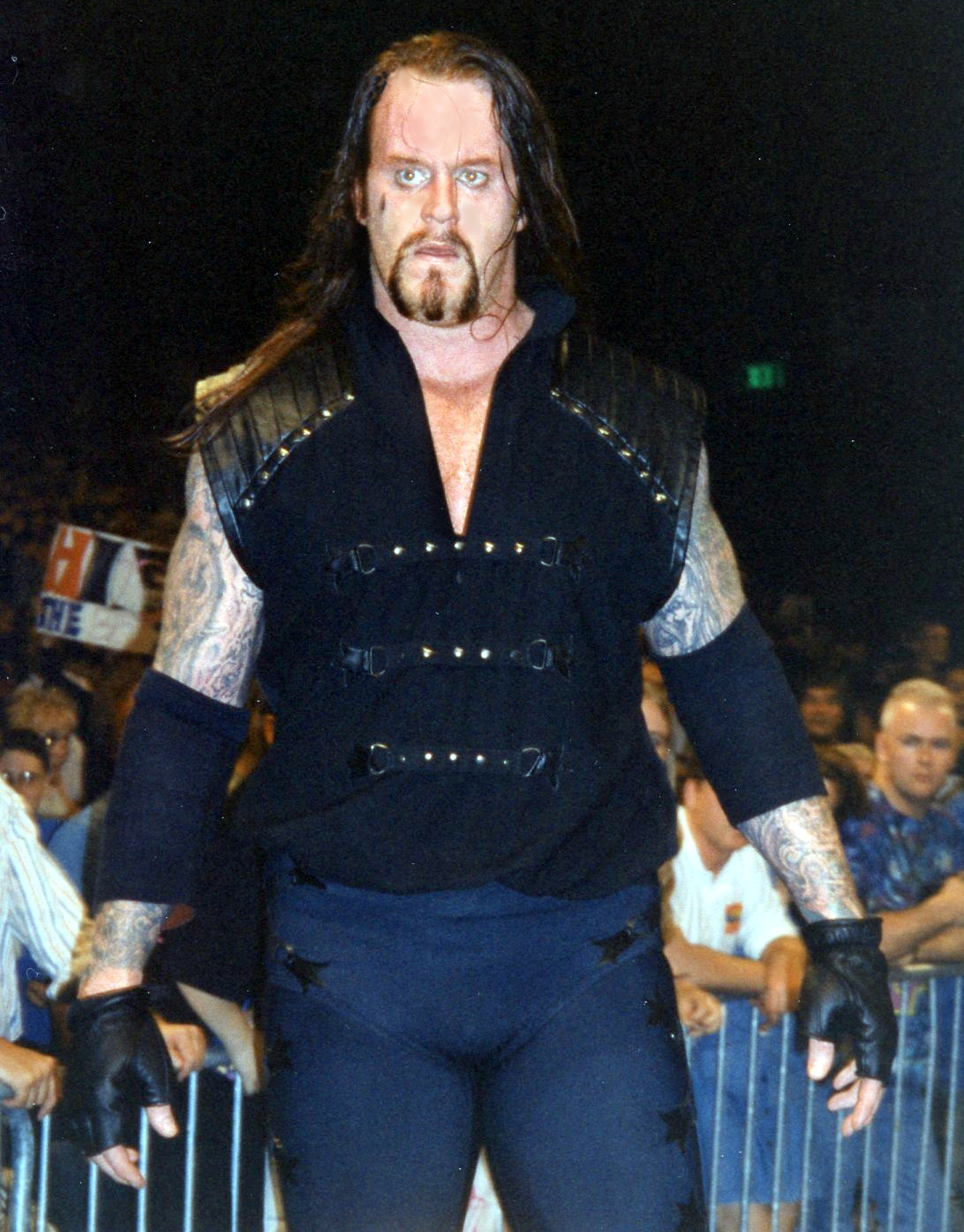
The Undertaker (pictured), who fought Shawn Michaels to a no contest

In the final match, The Undertaker fought Shawn Michaels. Before the match started, Undertaker began to stalk Michaels around the ring. Michaels grabbed the referee to use as a shield and then pushed him into Undertaker. The referee was met with a punch to the face from Undertaker, which shocked Michaels who then told Vince McMahon at the broadcast table that he wanted no part of the match. As Michaels was leaving, he was met by Commissioner Slaughter, who directed him back to the ring. Undertaker then picked up the referee and tossed him over the top rope sending him crashing down onto Michaels. The Undertaker exited the ring and pursued Michaels up the entrance ramp where he gave him a bodyslam and then knocked him back down the ramp towards the ring. Undertaker continued to punish Michaels by throwing him into the ring steps and choking him with television cables, among other attacks, all while the match had yet to begin. After several minutes, a replacement referee finally appeared. The Undertaker turned his attention to the referee who wanted him to stay inside the ring. Michaels took the opportunity to chop Undertaker's left knee from behind as the bell rang for the official start of the match. At one point in the match, Undertaker had Michaels cornered in the ring, ready to deliver a chair to his head, but the referee interrupted by grabbing the chair. The referee and Undertaker began a struggle for control of the chair when Michaels dropkicked Undertaker from behind, which forced him and the chair into the referee's head, knocking him out. After a few minutes of Michaels attacking Undertaker, Rick Rude came to ringside and handed Michaels brass knuckles. Michaels nailed Undertaker with them, stuffed them down the front of his tights, and went for the pinfall but the referee was still out. Hunter Hearst Helmsley and Chyna then escorted another replacement referee to the ring but Michaels could only get a two count. This angered Michaels who decked the referee with a punch and continued to punish Undertaker, along with help from Helmsley and Chyna. Michaels then appeared to help the second referee back to his feet before intentionally driving his head into the turnbuckle, knocking him out again. A little later, The Undertaker retrieved the brass knuckles from Michaels' tights and decked him with them. The second referee attempted to make a count but Michaels lifted his shoulder at two. The Undertaker then grabbed the referee and performed a chokeslam on him. Referee Tim White then appeared and called for the bell, declaring the result of the match a no-contest. Michaels and Undertaker continued to assault WWF officials, referees, and each other, which prompted the entire dressing room of wrestlers to come out and help separate the two. Michaels, Helmsley, and Chyna all retreated as the pay-per-view feed ended with Undertaker alone in the ring as the fans cheered.

== Reception ==
The WWF earned $82,228 in ticket sales with an attendance of 4,963. The pay-per-view received a buyrate of 0.45, which is the equivalent of approximately 180,000 buys. John C. of The Wrestling Oratory rated the show 4 out of 10. The event was released in the United Kingdom on VHS on November 10, 1997, by Silver Vision.

In 2008, J.D. Dunn of 411Mania gave the event a rating of 7.0 [Good], stating, "This is a PPV of peaks and valleys with Bret/Patriot, Taker/Shawn and the minis being fine matches, but the rest being a pass. It did have Austin going nuts and handing out Stunners, though, which is another plus. Like a lot of shows from this time, you had the guys you could count on to deliver ***+ matches like Owen, Vader, Taker, Shawn, Bret & Austin, and "all the rest." Thumbs up, but be prepared to fast-forward through the early parts."

== Aftermath ==
Shawn Michaels and The Undertaker went on to compete in the first Hell in a Cell match at Badd Blood. The Patriot continued his feud with members of the Hart Foundation, as he teamed with Vader to battle Bret Hart and the British Bulldog in a Flag match at Badd Blood. On the September 8 edition of Raw Is War, The Headbangers were scheduled to face two unknown wrestlers in a non-title match but those wrestlers were attacked beforehand by The Godwinns, who then took their place and defeated The Headbangers with help from their debuting kayfabe relative, Uncle Cletus. The Godwinns went on to win the WWF Tag Team Championship from The Headbangers at Badd Blood. Brian Pillman and Goldust continued their rivalry with Goldust attacking and interfering in Pillman's matches. Pillman was scheduled to face Dude Love at Badd Blood, with Goldust handcuffed to the ring post to prevent him from interfering, but the match was canceled due to Pillman's sudden death just hours before the event.

== Results ==
No.	Results	Stipulations	Times
1	Brian Pillman defeated Goldust (with Marlena)	Singles match As Goldust lost, Marlena had to become Pillman's personal assistant for 30 days. If Pillman had lost, he would have had to leave the WWF.	11:06
2	Brian Christopher defeated Scott Putski by countout	Singles match	4:45
3	Savio Vega defeated Faarooq and Crush	Triple threat match	11:37
4	Max Mini defeated El Torito	Singles match	9:21
5	The Headbangers (Mosh and Thrasher) defeated The Godwinns (Henry O. Godwinn and Phineas I. Godwinn), The Legion of Doom (Hawk and Animal), and Owen Hart and The British Bulldog	Fatal 4-Way Elimination match for the vacant WWF Tag Team Championship	17:19
6	Bret Hart (c) defeated The Patriot	Singles match for the WWF Championship	19:19
7	Shawn Michaels vs. The Undertaker ended in a no contest	Singles match	16:20
(c) / – the champion(s) heading into the match
