= Hardcore Heaven (1997) =

1997 Extreme Championship Wrestling pay-per-view event

- Promotion: Extreme Championship Wrestling
- Date: August 17, 1997
- City: Fort Lauderdale, Florida
- Venue: War Memorial Auditorium
- Attendance: 1,800
- Buy rate: 72,000

Pay-per-view chronology
← Previous; Barely Legal	Next → November to Remember

Hardcore Heaven chronology
← Previous; 1996	Next → 1999

The 1997 Hardcore Heaven was the fourth Hardcore Heaven professional wrestling event produced by Extreme Championship Wrestling (ECW). The event took place on August 17, 1997 at the War Memorial Auditorium in Fort Lauderdale, Florida. Joey Styles provided commentary for the event. This was the first edition of Hardcore Heaven to be broadcast on pay-per-view and ECW's second ever pay-per-view following Barely Legal in April.

Six professional wrestling matches were contested at the event. The main event was a Three-Way Dance for the ECW World Heavyweight Championship, in which Shane Douglas defeated defending champion Sabu and Terry Funk to win the title. In the penultimate match, Tommy Dreamer defeated Jerry Lawler in an interpromotional match between ECW and World Wrestling Federation (WWF). Also at the event, Taz and The Dudley Boyz (Buh Buh Ray Dudley and D-Von Dudley) retained the World Television Championship and the World Tag Team Championship respectively.

== Event ==
=== Prelude ===
Before the pay per view was underway, the hip-hop duo, Insane Clown Posse entered the ring to hype up the crowd and endorse Rob Van Dam who also entered the ring. However, Van Dam and Sabu proceeded to attack the rappers. The Sandman, who was a guest at ringside, entered the ring and defended Insane Clown Posse. Before Sandman could land a punch, Van Dam & Sabu assaulted him, causing him to be carried off into an ambulance by medics.

=== Preliminary matches ===
Rick Rude interrupted Joey Styles' opening introduction and brought out Chris Candido for his scheduled match against Taz for the World Television Championship. Tod Gordon banned Rude from ringside due to Rude not being a licensed manager. Taz then came to defend the title against Candido. Candido attempted a Blonde Bombshell on Taz but Taz countered with a Northern Lights Tazplex which knocked both men out until they got up at eight. They exchanged moves until Taz hit a T-Bone Tazplex. Candido countered by powerslamming Taz but turned his back and began posing, allowing Taz to apply a Tazmission on Candido from behind to retain the title.

Next, Spike Dudley competed against Bam Bam Bigelow. Dudley managed to hit an Acid Drop early into the match but Bigelow soon gained momentum and dominated Dudley. He tossed him from the ring into the crowd. Bigelow pulled Dudley back into the ring and hit a piledriver and a Bam Bamsault for the win.

Next, Al Snow took on Rob Van Dam. Bill Alfonso handed a chair to RVD, who hit a Van Daminator to Snow for the win.

The Gangstas (New Jack and Mustafa) were stripped of the World Tag Team Championship due to Mustafa leaving ECW and The Dudley Boyz (Buh Buh Ray Dudley and D-Von Dudley) were awarded the title belts, who defended it against PG-13 (J. C. Ice and Wolfie D) in the following match. Dudley Boyz delivered a 3D to Wolfie to retain the titles.

In the penultimate match, Tommy Dreamer competed against Jerry Lawler. Rick Rude interfered in the match by hitting Dreamer with a trashcan and Lawler gained a near-fall. Jake Roberts showed up next and hit a short-arm clothesline to Dreamer and then executed a DDT. Lawler extended a handshake to Roberts but Roberts hit a short-arm clothesline to Lawler as well, who fell on top of Dreamer for another near-fall. The action then continued until Tammy Lynn Sytch interfered to attack Dreamer but Beulah McGillicutty countered her interference. Lawler grabbed Beulah and tried to hit a piledriver. Dreamer tried to make the save by attempting a chair shot on Lawler but Lawler used Beulah as a shield, who low blowed Lawler, allowing Dreamer to apply a testicular claw and a DDT for the win.

=== Main event match ===
Sabu defended the World Heavyweight Championship against Terry Funk and Shane Douglas in a three-way dance. The Sandman was taken out by Sabu and Rob Van Dam earlier in the show but came back to the arena in an ambulance and interfered in the main event by shoving Sabu from the top rope. Sandman delivered a Rolling Rock to Sabu onto a ladder, allowing Funk and Douglas to simultaneously pin him to eliminate him. Francine aided Douglas in attacking Funk until Dory Funk, Jr. came to the ring and attacked Douglas and then chased Francine to the backstage. The action continued between Funk and Douglas as Douglas hit a belly-to-belly suplex to win the title.

== Reception ==
The event received mixed reviews from critics. David of Wrestling Recaps wrote "This was ECW’s second pay-per-view, and it is unfortunately noted for having cheap production quality. There’s bad lighting and the crowd sound doesn’t get enough volume in the mix" but he considered Hardcore Heaven, a "solid show" and appreciated the matches, with "Dreamer/Lawler is way better than it sounds, the main event is entertaining, Taz/Candido is as good as a 10-minute match gets, and the rest of it isn’t the worst" and recommended that ECW "should have held the show at the ECW Arena".

Scott Keith of 411Mania wrote "The energy was pretty much there, but the card was so eggreciously bad in booking and setup that it would have taken a Herculean effort to overcome it in the first place" and he gave a "mild recommendation to avoid".

TJ Hawke of 411Mania gave a rating of 3 stars, stating it to be a "bad show", with "The only thing the crowd seemed to actively care about was the post-main event brawl. That is not a good sign for the quality of a show. The only match from this show that I would encourage someone to check out is Bam Bam vs. Spike. That was awesome."

Jack Stevenson of 411Mania considered it an average event by giving a rating of 5 stars and stated "Very little of this was actively bad, but there was nothing really good either" and "Taz-Candido and RVD-Snow were reasonable". He further added "Aside from mentioning the horrible crowd, the star ratings really tell the story- bottoming out at *, but peaking at ** ¾. In short, it’s an inoffensive time-waster, but not worth spending money on."

Wrestling 20 Years Ago staff rated the event 3 out of 10, writing "People in the building seemed to like the show, as did many ECW fans, but this show does not stand up at all well. The Sandman story was bizarre, the lighting bush-league and the in ring action not at the standard ECW would want."

== Results ==
No.	Results	Stipulations	Times
1	Taz (c) defeated Chris Candido by submission	Singles match for the ECW World Television Championship	10:52
2	Bam Bam Bigelow defeated Spike Dudley	Singles match	5:05
3	Rob Van Dam (with Bill Alfonso) defeated Al Snow	Singles match	13:43
4	The Dudley Boyz (Buh Buh Ray and D-Von) (c) (with Jenna Jameson, Joel Gertner, Sign Guy Dudley and Big Dick Dudley) defeated PG-13 (Jamie Dundee and Wolfie D)	Tag team match for the ECW World Tag Team Championship	10:58
5	Tommy Dreamer (with Beulah McGillicutty) defeated Jerry Lawler	Singles match	18:57
6	Shane Douglas (with Francine) defeated Sabu (c) (with Bill Alfonso) and Terry Funk (with Dory Funk Jr.)	Three-Way Dance for the ECW World Heavyweight Championship	26:37
(c) / – the champion(s) heading into the match

=== Three-Way Dance eliminations ===
Elimination no.	Wrestler	Eliminated by	Elimination move	Time
1	Sabu	Terry Funk and Shane Douglas	Rolling Rock on a ladder by The Sandman	19:34
2	Terry Funk	Shane Douglas	Belly-to-belly suplex	26:37
Winner:	Shane Douglas			

== See also ==
- 1997 in professional wrestling
