= Botch (professional wrestling) =

Professional wrestling term

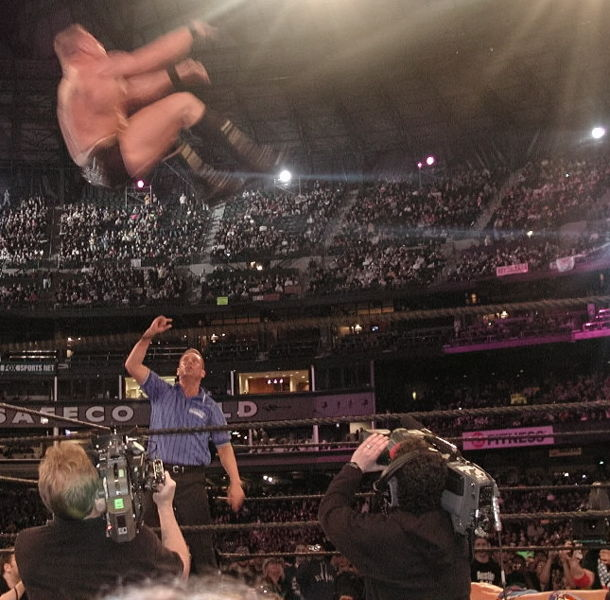
Brock Lesnar failed to fully rotate when he performed a shooting star press on Kurt Angle in the main event of WrestleMania XIX, resulting in a concussion.

To botch in professional wrestling means to fail in attempting a scripted move or spoken line by mistake, miscalculation, or an error in judgment. Many botches are harmless, such as a wrestler simply flubbing a line, missing a cue, or falling before their opponent's move actually connects. At times, however, a poorly timed or executed move has resulted in serious injury or even death.

== Causes ==
A common cause of botches is inexperience. Jackie Gayda, winner of the Tough Enough 2 competition, in one of her first televised matches (a tag team match with Christopher Nowinski against Trish Stratus and Bradshaw on the July 8, 2002 edition of Raw from Philadelphia, Pennsylvania), botched nearly every move that she tried or attempted to sell, the most infamous of which was a second-rope-bulldog by Stratus, which Gayda sold two seconds too late. On April 26, 1976, Bruno Sammartino suffered a neck fracture in a match against the relatively inexperienced Stan Hansen at Madison Square Garden, when Hansen improperly executed a body slam. Bruno came back eight weeks later for a rematch.

Another cause is due to suffering an injury right before or during the match, or not being in proper condition to carry a match and it going ahead anyway. Such as when during a poorly received match between The Undertaker and Goldberg at 2019's Super Showdown, Goldberg (who was concussed throughout the match) failed to execute his Jackhammer finisher on the Undertaker and instead dropped him on his head without protection, Undertaker did not suffer a neck injury from the botch as he landed on Goldberg's bicep which provided cushioning from the drop. Another example was the Jeff Hardy vs Sting championship match at 2011's TNA Victory Road being cut short due to backstage concern over Jeff Hardy's well-being as he reportedly drank and used drugs hours before the match and was not in a proper condition to compete in the match before it started.

== Aftermath ==
=== Injury ===
Botches can occasionally be extremely dangerous and can result in the end of a wrestler's career or loss of life. For example, WWE wrestler D'Lo Brown once botched a running sitout powerbomb on his opponent Droz, resulting in Droz being rendered quadriplegic (although he later regained some use of his upper body). This botch was mainly caused by D'Lo not being able to get a grip on the baggy clothing worn by Droz while holding him in the powerbomb position. Droz also did not cinch himself up at the waist as is the safety measure for powerbomb receivers. In other cases, the wrestler performing the move could be injured. Japanese wrestler Hayabusa botched a springboard moonsault in a match against Mammoth Sasaki when his foot slipped on the second rope and he landed on his head, causing damage to his spine and neck and paralyzing him, although he regained feeling in his legs before his death in 2016.

In May 2001, Brian Ong was training with Dalip Singh (better known as the Great Khali) and took a flapjack from Singh. The move was botched, reportedly because Ong had grabbed Singh's shirt instead of pushing off Singh's back as he was instructed. Although he had made the mistake several times before without incident, this time Ong landed tailbone first and his head was violently whipped back against the mat. The resulting impact caused catastrophic damage to his spine and brainstem. Coupled with a previous concussion, the move resulted in Ong's death a few days later.

=== Improvising endings ===
In most cases, minor botches are simply glossed over and the match is continued. One example was the ending of the Hulk Hogan–Sid Justice match at WrestleMania VIII. The planned ending was to involve Papa Shango running into the ring to break up Hogan's pin attempt. However, Shango missed his cue, forcing Sid to kick out of the pin attempt and manager Harvey Whippleman to jump onto the ring apron to interfere and prompt the disqualification, just as Shango ran into the ring to assist Sid with the intended double-team beating of Hogan.

Serious botches resulting in injuries often result in improvised endings to matches, or the remainder of a match will be canceled if a wrestler cannot continue or requires immediate medical attention. During the match between Stone Cold Steve Austin and Owen Hart at SummerSlam 1997, Hart botched a piledriver, breaking Austin's neck. Hart was forced to improvise an extended taunt sequence until Austin was able to regain his composure and roll him up in a schoolboy pin, ending the match earlier than planned but with the desired winner. If a wrestler is seriously injured, the referee normally signals the need for immediate help by doing an "X" formation with his arms over his head. In recent years, as some wrestling fans have noticed this, the referee may sometimes perform the symbol in an attempt to indicate a kayfabe injury to another performer, which will lead to the match being called off.

Botches can also involve scripted lines. During the airing of WrestleMania XXX, Hulk Hogan—serving as the host of WrestleMania—mistakenly referred to the Mercedes-Benz Superdome to the live audience as the Silverdome, the home of WrestleMania III and where Hogan had his famous showdown with André the Giant. After Hogan corrected himself, Stone Cold Steve Austin and The Rock would rib Hogan for calling the Superdome the Silverdome, and it ended up being a running gag for the rest of WrestleMania XXX and into the post-WrestleMania Raw the next night.

=== Positive impact ===
Sometimes botches can lead to the accidental invention of new moves. For example, the diving headbutt was invented when Harley Race botched a splash from the top rope, but Race later regretted inventing the move since it caused lasting damage to his body. Jake "The Snake" Roberts claims to have invented the DDT when he was accidentally tripped by his opponent while applying a front facelock. Toshiaki Kawada inadvertently invented the Ganso bomb, one of the most dangerous moves in wrestling, after he failed to execute a powerbomb on Mitsuharu Misawa due to breaking his arm earlier in the match and instead dropped his head unprotected. Drew McIntyre has stated that his running kick finishing move, The Claymore, was accidentally invented as he slipped while delivering an attempted Big Boot, with the tight leather pants he was wearing at the time forcing him to fall to the mat.

Similarly, botches can also have positive impacts on wrestler's careers. As an example, during a feud with Ronda Rousey, Becky Lynch led an invasion of the former's show (as Rousey was a member of Monday Night Raw at the time, while Lynch was on SmackDown). During the ensuing Raw vs. SmackDown melee, Nia Jax botched a punch, resulting in a broken nose and concussion for Lynch. This event, and especially the bloody photographs of Lynch afterward, are attributed by fans, as well as Lynch herself, to be the catapult of her ascent to the top of the WWE Women's Division and her current position at the peak of WWE women's performers.

== See also ==
- Glossary of professional wrestling terms
- Mass Transit incident (professional wrestling)
