= Danno O'Shocker =

Scottish professional wrestler

Personal information
- Born: Jack Lloyd; 23 December 1923 Hamilton, South Lanarkshire, Scotland
- Died: 31 August 1997

Professional wrestling career
- Ring name(s): Dan Geohagen; Jack Lloyd; Danno O'Shocker; Danny O'Shocker; Dan O'Shocker
- Debut: 1952
- Retired: 1964

Jack Lloyd (23 December 1923 – 31 August 1997), better known as Danno O'Shocker, was a Scottish professional wrestler.

== Career ==
Lloyd was born on 23 December 1923 in Hamilton, South Lanarkshire, Scotland.

He made his debut in 1952, wrestling for Sam Muchnick Sports Attractions in St. Louis, Missouri. Throughout his career, he wrestler for NWA Chicago, Big Time Wrestling, Jim Crockett Promotions, Maple Leaf Pro Wrestling, and the AWA.

Lloyd died 31 August 1997, aged 73.
