= SummerSlam (1997) =

World Wrestling Federation pay-per-view event

- Promotional poster featuring Bret Hart and The Undertaker
- Promotion: World Wrestling Federation
- Date: August 3, 1997
- City: East Rutherford, New Jersey
- Venue: Continental Airlines Arena
- Attendance: 20,213
- Buy rate: 235,000
- Tagline: Hart & Soul

Pay-per-view chronology
← Previous; In Your House 16: Canadian Stampede	Next → Ground Zero: In Your House

SummerSlam chronology
← Previous; 1996	Next → 1998

The 1997 SummerSlam, promoted as SummerSlam: Hart & Soul, was a professional wrestling pay-per-view (PPV) event produced by the World Wrestling Federation (WWF, renamed WWE in 2002). It was the 10th annual SummerSlam and took place on August 3, 1997, at the Continental Airlines Arena in East Rutherford, New Jersey. This was the second SummerSlam to be held at the venue, after the 1989 event when it was known as the Brendan Byrne Arena (renamed in 1996).

Seven matches were contested at the event. The promotional title was a reference to the rivalry between Bret Hart and The Undertaker. This was the main event of the show where Hart defeated Undertaker to win the WWF Championship which had Shawn Michaels as the special guest referee. If Hart had lost the match, he would have never been able to wrestle in the United States ever again, and additionally, if Michaels had shown any bias towards either competitor, he too would have never been able to wrestle in the United States ever again.

The event also included the culmination of a contest in partnership with Discovery Zone with a US$1 million prize which nobody won. It included several attempted calls where nobody was home. The contest ended after a potential winner failed to guess the proper key to the casket containing the prize money. The event also marked the first WWF pay-per-view appearance of commentator Michael Cole, and the last WWF pay-per-view appearance of Todd Pettengill, who left the company before returning to host segments and matches of the DVD and Blu-ray release The Best of In Your House: Pay-Per-View Classics 1995–1999 in 2013.

== Production ==
=== Background ===
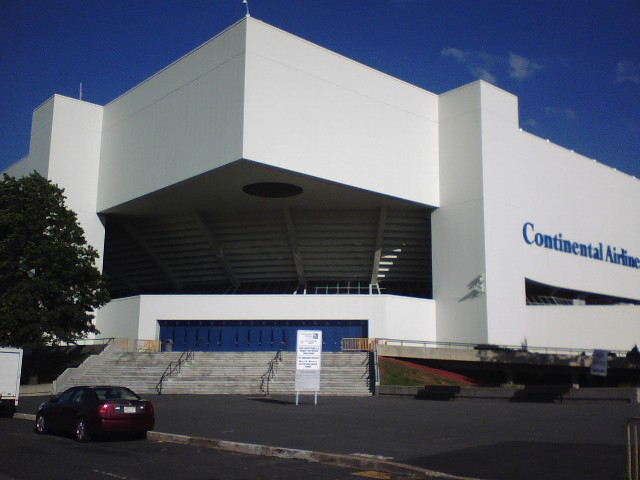
The 10th annual SummerSlam was the second time for the event to be held at the Continental Airlines Arena in East Rutherford, New Jersey, after the 1989 event when it was known as the Brendan Byrne Arena (renamed in 1996).

SummerSlam is an annual professional wrestling pay-per-view (PPV) event produced every August by the World Wrestling Federation (WWF, renamed WWE in 2002) since 1988. Dubbed "The Biggest Party of the Summer", it is one of the promotion's original four PPVs, along with WrestleMania, Royal Rumble, and Survivor Series, referred to as the "Big Four", and was considered one of the "Big Five" PPVs with the addition of King of the Ring in 1993. It has since become considered the WWF's second biggest event of the year behind WrestleMania. The 10th SummerSlam was scheduled to be held on August 3, 1997, at the Continental Airlines Arena in East Rutherford, New Jersey, marking the second SummerSlam to be held at the venue, after the 1989 event when it was known as the Brendan Byrne Arena (renamed in 1996). It also had the promotional title "Hart & Soul" as a reference to the rivalry between Bret Hart and The Undertaker.

=== Storylines ===
SummerSlam 1997 featured professional wrestling matches involving different wrestlers from pre-existing scripted feuds, plots and storylines that were played out on Raw Is War and other WWF television programs.

The featured rivalry heading into the event involved WWF Champion The Undertaker and Bret Hart. On the July 7 episode of Raw is War at Edmonton, Alberta, Hart was announced as the number one contender for the WWF Championship. In an interview with Vince McMahon, Hart said that if he did not win the title at SummerSlam, he would not wrestle on American soil again. The next week, Shawn Michaels, Hart's nemesis, requested Vince McMahon to be a part of SummerSlam. On the July 21 episode of Raw Is War, Hart, his brother Owen, and his brother-in-law The British Bulldog (The Hart Foundation), challenged three American wrestlers into a flag match. Michaels was announced as a special referee for the main event at SummerSlam, and in response to the announcement, Hart attacked Michaels and McMahon. Later, the Hart Foundation defeated the American team that contained the WWF Tag Team Champions "Stone Cold" Steve Austin and Dude Love, with the Undertaker, where the Hart Foundation won thanks to an interference from Brian Pillman. The next week, Hart challenged The Patriot, a match where Hart lost thanks to an interference from Michaels. After the match, the referees prevented Hart from attacking Michaels while the Undertaker watched from the entrance ramp.

A predominant feud entering the event featured WWF Intercontinental Champion Owen Hart and "Stone Cold" Steve Austin. On July 6, on the Canadian Stampede pay-per-view, Hart managed to pin Austin in a five-on-five match. The day after it, Austin attacked Hart while he was singing the Canadian national anthem. On the same night, Austin told Vince McMahon that if he did not win the title from Hart at SummerSlam, he will kiss Hart's ass. The next week, Austin teamed up with Dude Love to win the vacant tag team titles in a match with Hart and the British Bulldog. On the July 21 episode of Raw Is War, Hart's team managed to defeat Austin's team at a three-on-three flag match. The next week, Hart attacked Austin during a WWF Tag Team Championship match against The Godwinns, counting him out. After the match, Austin attacked Hart.

Another rivalry heading into the event featured the WWF European Champion The British Bulldog and Ken Shamrock. The two were on opposing teams of the Canadian Stampede pay-per-view. On the July 14 episode of Raw Is War, the Bulldog said that if he lost at SummerSlam, he would eat a can of dog food right after the match. The next week, the Bulldog attacked Shamrock during a match with Vader, powerslamming him on the steel ramp, and making him lose the match via countout. The next week, Bulldog and Shamrock competed in an arm wrestling contest, but as Shamrock was about to win, the Bulldog headbutted him, hit him with a steel chair, and poured a can of dog food over him.

== Steve Austin incident ==
The event is perhaps best remembered for the WWF Intercontinental Championship match between Owen Hart, and "Stone Cold" Steve Austin that featured Hart delivering a botched piledriver that legitimately injured Austin's neck, and temporarily paralyzed him, leaving him with many years of neck issues, and potentially derailing the WWF's momentum in the Monday Night War during a time when the WWF could not afford to lose any more ground to World Championship Wrestling.

In his audiobook autobiography, Austin revealed that he and Hart were planning on the spots in the match when Austin (who was booked to win the match and the title) suggested to Hart about performing a piledriver as a false finish, under the condition that it was the knee-drop Tombstone piledriver variant used by The Undertaker as opposed to the more common sitout variant. Hart said he was more comfortable performing the latter variant but assured Austin that he would not hurt him. Coming off a critically acclaimed feud with Hart's brother Bret Hart (who gained a reputation for not injuring opponents), Austin obliged.

However, at the planned spot Hart was unable to protect Austin's head, leading to Austin breaking his neck and temporarily suffering paralysis. Austin informed referee Earl Hebner that he could not move and that Hart should not touch him. Once Hebner informed Hart, he started buying time for Austin to recover by taunting the crowd that Austin was about to "kiss his ass" (per the pre-match stipulation if Austin did not win the title) until Austin had recovered enough to perform a very weak roll-up to end the match early and with the scheduled finish of Austin winning the Intercontinental Championship, with the "kiss my ass" stipulation being nullified.

The injury left Austin sidelined for weeks, during a time when the WWF were at their lowest point in the Monday Night War when WCW was amid an 83-week winning streak with WCW Monday Nitro beating out Raw is War, putting them in jeopardy to have their biggest rising star off television. While Austin was able to recover, he continued to suffer neck issues and was written off of television at the 1999 Survivor Series to undergo neck surgery, eventually forcing him to retire at age 38 in 2003.

Austin has since stated that his neck is in good shape and he is in zero pain after his neck surgery was successful. The accident was a source of backstage conflict between the two men, but Austin ultimately forgave Hart, and paid tribute to him on Raw Is War the night after Hart fell to his death at Over the Edge 1999.

The botch, while initially appearing fatal for the WWF in the Monday Night War, ultimately proved to be a speed bump. However, the WWF still took preventative action, legitimately banning the piledriver in 2000. The Undertaker and Kane were grandfathered to keep using it, as the two were proven safe with the move, while Rikishi began to use the Banzai drop (co-opted by his real-life cousin Yokozuna) as his finishing move. Subsequent wrestlers who used variations of the piledriver on the independent circuit, such as Kevin Owens, dropped the move from their moveset upon signing with the now-WWE.

== Reception ==
In 2006, J.D. Dunn of 411Mania gave the event a rating of 5.0 [Not So Good], stating, "It was headed into "worst PPV ever" territory until the final two matches. The WWF was trying hard to get things going during the summer of '97, but it would take another year before they started to win the war with WCW. Too much mediocre crap in the early matches is a big part of the reason why. Oddly enough, Austin's injury would turn him into more of a talker for the next few months, and he would get even *more* over with the fans. Plus, it led to the anti-authoritarian character that made all that money against Vince McMahon. Mild thumbs up for historical reasons and Foley, Hart, Austin & Undertaker."

The event contained several extended promo segments that did not appear to evoke much crowd reaction. For example, the then-governor of New Jersey Christine Todd Whitman was given significant time on the microphone and a championship belt, for lowering taxes on professional wrestling events. In another segment, Todd Pettengill spent significant time calling several people on the phone with no one answering, as he stared at a list of names Tammy Lynn Sytch was holding under her cleavage, for a purported million-dollar sweepstakes promotion.

== Results ==
No.	Results	Stipulations	Times
1	Mankind defeated Hunter Hearst Helmsley (with Chyna)	Steel Cage match	16:26
2	Goldust (with Marlena) defeated Brian Pillman	Singles match Since Pillman lost, he had to wear a dress.	7:17
3	The Legion of Doom (Hawk and Animal) defeated The Godwinns (Henry O. Godwinn and Phineas I. Godwinn)	Tag team match	9:15
4	The British Bulldog (c) defeated Ken Shamrock by disqualification	Singles match for the WWF European Championship; Had Bulldog lost the title, he would have had to eat a can of dog food.	7:26
5	Los Boricuas (Savio Vega, Miguel Pérez Jr., José Estrada Jr., and Jesús Castillo) defeated The Disciples of Apocalypse (Crush, Chainz, 8-Ball, and Skull)	Eight-man tag team match	9:08
6	"Stone Cold" Steve Austin defeated Owen Hart (c)	Singles match for the WWF Intercontinental Championship; Had Austin lost, he would have had to kiss Hart's buttocks.	16:14
7	Bret Hart defeated The Undertaker (c)	Singles match for the WWF Championship; Shawn Michaels was the special guest referee. Had Hart lost, he would have never been able to wrestle in the United States again. Additionally, had Michaels shown any bias towards either competitor, he too would have never been able to wrestle in the United States again.	28:08
(c) / – the champion(s) heading into the match

== Other on-screen talent ==
Commentators

- Vince McMahon
- Jim Ross
- Jerry Lawler

French commentators

- Jean Brassard
- Raymond Rougeau

Spanish commentators

- Carlos Cabrera
- Tito Santana

Interviewers

- Michael Cole
- Todd Pettengill

Ring announcer

- Howard Finkel

Referees

- Mike Chioda
- Earl Hebner
- Jim Korderas
- Tim White
- Jack Doan
- Shawn Michaels
