= ECW Barely Legal =

1997 Extreme Championship Wrestling pay-per-view event

Barely Legal
- DVD cover featuring The Sandman and Rob Van Dam
- Promotion: Extreme Championship Wrestling
- Date: April 13, 1997
- City: Philadelphia, Pennsylvania
- Venue: ECW Arena
- Attendance: 1,170
- Buy rate: 45,000

Pay-per-view chronology
← Previous; First	Next → Hardcore Heaven

Barely Legal was the inaugural professional wrestling pay-per-view (PPV) event held by Extreme Championship Wrestling (ECW). It took place on April 13, 1997, from the ECW Arena in Philadelphia, Pennsylvania.

Rob Van Dam versus Lance Storm was included on the 2005 WWE DVD release Rob Van Dam: One of a Kind. Sabu versus Taz was included on the 2012 WWE DVD and Blu-ray release ECW Unreleased: Vol 1 and the 2013 WWE DVD and Blu-ray release The Top 25 Rivalries in Wrestling History. The Eliminators versus The Dudley Boyz was included on the 2016 WWE DVD and Blu-ray release Straight Outta Dudleyville: The Legacy of The Dudley Boyz.

Seven professional wrestling matches were scheduled on the main card. In one of the show's main event's, Terry Funk defeated The Sandman and Stevie Richards in a Three-Way Dance to earn an immediate title match against ECW World Heavyweight Champion Raven, which Funk also won to win the ECW World Heavyweight Championship. In another main event, Taz defeated Sabu via submission. Featured matches on the undercard included Shane Douglas defeating Pitbull #2 to retain the ECW World Television Championship and The Eliminators (Kronus and Saturn) defeating The Dudley Boyz (Buh Buh Ray Dudley and D-Von Dudley) to win the ECW World Tag Team Championship.

== Background ==
Difficulties getting pay-per-view companies to air Barely Legal arose in late 1996 when Request TV initially canceled the show after wrestling journalist Wade Keller alerted Request of the November 1996 "Mass Transit" incident during an interview about the event. Another company, Premiere, expressed concern over the amount of violence ECW showcased, and that its programming was not suitable for children. Eventually, through the efforts of e-mails from hundreds of fans, Premiere decided to carry the event. However, e-mails sent to Viewer's Choice and Cablevision were unsuccessful in convincing the companies to air the show, as they were unhappy with visual imagery used in ECW's television, including young Tyler Fullington's involvement in the Raven/Sandman feud. After further discussions with ECW owner Paul Heyman and ECW GM Steve Karel, Request TV reversed their earlier decision and agreed to carry the event under certain conditions which included, among other things, an advanced script of the show, pushing back the scheduled start time from 7 p.m. to 9 p.m., and no excessive amount of blood. On the February 24, 1997 episode of the World Wrestling Federation's (WWF) Monday Night Raw, several wrestlers representing ECW including Tommy Dreamer, Stevie Richards, and The Blue Meanie invaded the WWF. During the event, Paul Heyman joined Vince McMahon and Jerry Lawler on commentary and promoted the Barely Legal pay-per-view on the program. On the March 10, 1997 episode of Monday Night Raw, a televised debate between Heyman and Lawler was held with Jim Ross acting as a moderator for the debate.

== Event ==
=== Preliminary matches ===
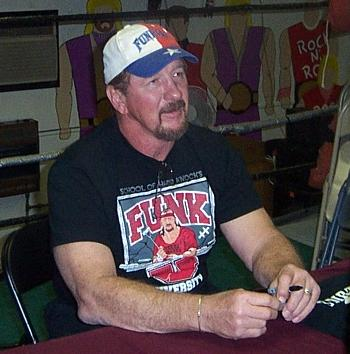
Terry Funk defeated Raven for the ECW World Heavyweight Championship in the main event of Barely Legal.

The first match to air live on pay-per-view was a tag team match for the ECW World Tag Team Championship between the champions, the Dudley Boyz (Buh Buh Ray Dudley and D-Von Dudley), and the challengers, The Eliminators (Kronus and Saturn). The majority of the match was controlled by The Eliminators using a variety of double-team and high-flying maneuvers. The match ended when The Eliminators performed their finishing move, Total Elimination, and Saturn pinned Buh Buh Ray to win the ECW Tag Team Championship. Buh Buh Ray Dudley suffered a legitimate broken ankle during the match.

The following match was a standard singles match between Lance Storm and Rob Van Dam. Chris Candido was originally scheduled to be Storm's opponent, but could not compete due to a biceps injury. The match was fast-paced with both men exchanging control throughout, using many high-risk maneuvers, as well as steel chairs. At about the ten-minute mark, Storm connected with two chair shots to Van Dam's head. Before he could connect for the third time, Van Dam sprung up from his knees and performed a Van Daminator, kicking the chair Storm was holding into his face. Van Dam then performed a standing moonsault and pinned Storm for the victory.

The next match was a six-man tag team match featuring wrestlers from Michinoku Pro Wrestling which saw Taka Michinoku, Terry Boy and Dick Togo battle The Great Sasuke, Gran Hamada and Masato Yakushiji (who replaced the injured Gran Naniwa). The action was back-and-forth between both teams and filled with high-flying maneuvers. The team of Sasuke, Hamada and Yakushiji won the match when Sasuke pinned Michinoku with a tiger suplex.

The following match was a singles match for the ECW World Television Championship between the champion, Shane Douglas and the challenger, Pitbull #2. Douglas was accompanied by his valet Francine and several "riot squad" officers. Pitbull #2's tag team partner, Pitbull #1, was shown sitting in the front row for the match because, according to the storyline, doctors had not medically cleared him to be ringside. Pitbull #2 rushed to the ring and immediately began attacking Douglas. Pitbull #2 controlled the early portion of the match with a series of takedowns and headlocks. Douglas then gained control after he countered a powerbomb with a headscissors takedown which brought both wrestlers over the top rope to the outside of the ring. Douglas tossed Pitbull #2 back into the ring and performed three consecutive piledrivers. Later, both wrestlers ended up outside the ring and Pitbull #1 jumped over the audience guardrail and attacked Douglas, but was soon stopped and escorted to the locker room by the riot squad officers. After Douglas and Pitbull #2 exchanged control of the match for the next several minutes, Francine handed Douglas a pair of brass knuckles, which he then used twice on Pitbull #2. Douglas then hit Pitbull #2 over the head with a portion of a broken table, as well as the timekeeper's ring bell. Douglas attempted multiple pins during the series of attacks but Pitbull #2 kicked-out. After attempted outside interference from Chris Candido, Douglas performed a belly-to-belly suplex on Pitbull #2 and pinned him for the victory to retain the ECW Television Championship. As previously stipulated, the masked man, wearing a "Ravishing" Rick Rude robe, came to the ring to unmask. The man planted a kiss on Francine, and performed Rude's signature gyrations before Douglas hit him in the back with his championship belt. While getting back to his feet, the masked man revealed himself to be Brian Lee, as one of the riot squad officers entered the ring and removed his helmet, revealing himself to be Rick Rude. A surprised Douglas attempted to plead with Rude but to no avail as Rude nailed him with a right hand punch followed by a chokeslam from Lee.

=== Main event matches ===
The next match was a standard singles match pitting Taz (with Bill Alfonso) versus Sabu. The match started with Taz and Sabu face-to-face before exchanging slaps and punches. Taz then clotheslined Sabu, which prompted Sabu to exit the ring to recoup. Sabu re-entered the ring and was immediately attacked by Taz, who attempted to apply his finishing submission move, the Tazmission, but was blocked by Sabu. After a series of forearm crossfaces by Taz, which caused Sabu to bleed from his nose, Sabu rolled out of the ring for a breather. He came back into the ring and performed a dropkick to Taz's knee followed by a slingshot kick off the second rope. The match continued outside the ring and into the crowd. Later in the match, Taz performed a series of suplex variations, followed by a Tazmission. Sabu was not able to respond to the referee, resulting in Taz winning the match. Following the match Taz praised Sabu and offered to shake his hand which Sabu accepted. While the two embraced, Rob Van Dam entered the ring and attacked Taz. After the double-team attack by Van Dam and Sabu, Alfonso formally aligned himself with the pair after he revealed a Sabu T-shirt he was wearing underneath his Taz T-shirt.

Other on-screen personnel
Role:	Name:
Commentator	Joey Styles
Commentator	Tommy Dreamer (ECW World Championship matches)
Ring announcer	Bob Artese
Ring announcer	Joel Gertner (for Dudley Boyz)
Referee	John Finegan
Referee	Jim Molineaux

The penultimate match was a Three Way Dance between Stevie Richards, The Sandman and Terry Funk. The winner would receive an immediate championship match against ECW World Heavyweight Champion Raven. The match began with multiple short-lived alliances between the competitors until Sandman retrieved a ladder to attack Richards and Funk. Later in the match, Funk gained control for a short time when he performed an airplane spin with the ladder, knocking down his opponents. The match continued with the three men exchanging attacks, in and outside of the ring, using weapons including a steel chair and a garbage can encased in sheet metal. Richards was eliminated from the match when both Funk and Sandman pinned him following a powerbomb. Sandman then introduced a string of barbed wire to the match. After Funk snatched the barbed wire and whipped Sandman's exposed back with it, Sandman regained possession and wrapped himself in the barbed wire. Richards then re-entered the ring and superkicked Sandman which allowed Funk to perform a moonsault from the top rope and pin Sandman to win the match.

Following the Three Way Dance, Raven immediately entered the ring as the bell rang to begin the ECW World Heavyweight Championship match. Raven dominated the majority of the match with the aid of chairs and tables while an ECW ringside doctor continuously checked Funk's condition due to his excessive bleeding from the head. Members of Raven's Nest eventually appeared to assist Raven which prompted Tommy Dreamer, who was providing guest commentary for the match, to enter the ring. Dreamer performed a DDT on Raven which allowed Funk to pin Raven and win the ECW World Heavyweight Championship.

== Reception ==
ECW earned $66,000 in ticket sales from an attendance of 1,170. The pay-per-view received a buyrate of 0.26, which is the equivalent of approximately 60,000 buys.

The backstage environment at this event was captured in the documentary Beyond the Mat, including a pre-show speech to the roster by Paul Heyman:

There are 17 million homes that have availability for this show tonight that will pay twenty dollars, hopefully, for the privilege to see you guys do what you have done for three and a half years.

Thank Terry Funk for all that he has done for this company. For helping to put us on the map. For being unselfish in selfish times. For taking the young guys and showing them a better way.

Tonight we have a chance to say, "Yeah, you're right - we're too extreme. We're too wild. We're too out of control. We're too full of our own shit." Or we have a chance to say "Hey, fuck you - you're wrong. Fuck you - we're right." Because you have all made it to the dance. Because believe me - this is the dance.

Barely Legal was released as part of a two-disc set with One Night Stand 2006 on July 11, 2006. It had previously been released in 2000 by Pioneer Entertainment as part of its "The Best of ECW" line of DVDs. The Pioneer release trimmed out many of the ring entrances, removed the music on the entrances not edited out (with the exception of songs ECW owned the rights to, including changing "Enter Sandman" from the Metallica version to Motörhead's cover), and edited out the backstage promos and part of Shane Douglas's promo in the ring. The release included with One Night Stand's DVD censored offensive language (used by the performers when they would cut promos, not used for the fans' chants) and changed the majority of the entrance music to music produced by WWE to avoid licensing fees. However, the event was also released completely uncut (18 certificate) with all entrances, original music, backstage vignettes and swearing included on the UK DVD and VHS release in 2001, released through Delta Music. This was a region free DVD.

== Results ==
No.	Results	Stipulations	Times
1^{D}	Louie Spicolli defeated Balls Mahoney	Singles match	5:00
2^{D}	Chris Chetti and J.T. Smith defeated The Full Blooded Italians (Little Guido and Tommy Rich)	Tag team match	—
3	The Eliminators (Kronus and Saturn) defeated The Dudley Boyz (Buh Buh Ray Dudley and D-Von Dudley) (c) (with Joel Gertner and Sign Guy Dudley)	Tag team match for the ECW World Tag Team Championship	6:11
4	Rob Van Dam defeated Lance Storm	Singles match	10:10
5	The Great Sasuke, Gran Hamada and Masato Yakushiji^{1} defeated bWo Japan (Taka Michinoku, Terry Boy and Dick Togo)	Six-man tag team match	16:55
6	Shane Douglas (c) (with Francine) defeated Pitbull #2	Singles match for the ECW World Television Championship	20:43
7	Taz (with Bill Alfonso) defeated Sabu by submission	Singles match	17:49
8	Terry Funk defeated The Sandman and Stevie Richards (with The Blue Meanie, Hollywood Nova, Thomas Rodman, and 7-11)	Three-Way Dance to determine the #1 contender for the ECW World Heavyweight Championship	19:10
9	Terry Funk defeated Raven (c)	Singles match for the ECW World Heavyweight Championship	7:20
(c) / – the champion(s) heading into the match; D / – this was a dark match

Yakushiji replaced an injured Gran Naniwa.
