= Godwinns =

Professional wrestling tag team

The Godwinns

Tag team
- Name(s): The Godwinns; Southern Justice; Tex Slazenger and Shanghai Pierce
- Members: Henry O. Godwinn / Shanghai Pierce / Mark Canterbury; Phineas I. Godwinn / Tex Slazenger / Dennis Knight
- Manager(s): Hillbilly Jim; Uncle Cletus
- Billed heights: Canterbury: 6 ft 4 in (1.93 m); Knight: 6 ft 3 in (1.91 m)
- Combined billed weight: 573 lb (260 kg)
- Billed from: "Bitters, Arkansas"
- Debut: 1991
- Disbanded: 1998
- Years active: 1991–1994, 1996–1998, 2006–2007, 2011–2012

The Godwinns were a professional wrestling tag team composed of Dennis Knight (Phineas I. Godwinn) and Mark Canterbury (Henry O. Godwinn) and they used to be in the WWF. The team used other gimmicks before they joined the WWF and had a gimmick change in the WWF shortly before disbanding. Their original WWF gimmick was that of two cousins who were hog farmers from Arkansas.

== History ==
=== Texas Hangmen (1991–1992) ===
The two men who would later be known as the Godwinns first started teaming in the United States Wrestling Association under the names Tex Sallinger (Phineas) and Master Blaster (Henry) in 1991. Master Blaster was masked while Sallinger was not. Due to their stature and ring outfits, some mistakenly believed that Sallinger and Blaster were a well traveled team known as "The Texas Hangmen" under a different gimmick as the Hangmen had recently left the USWA. The team feuded mainly with Jeff Jarrett and Robert Fuller as a part of the “Texas/Tennessee” storyline. After achieving little notoriety in the USWA, the two men were signed by World Championship Wrestling (WCW) in 1992.

=== Tex and Shanghai (1992–1994) ===
The duo was renamed "Tex Slazenger" and "Shanghai Pierce" who remained masked and made their debut in November 1992. Their debut was without much fanfare as they were at best perceived as a mid-card team used to help establish higher-level teams. They did have a “mini-feud” of sorts with Kent and Keith Cole, the Cole Twins. Tex and Shanghai would mainly appear on the WCW “B” shows such as WorldWide and WCW Saturday Night. Tex Slazenger somehow got a cult following among the fans of the “Saturday Night” tapings who'd chant for him when he was in the ring. During one Saturday Night show, color commentator Jesse Ventura nicknamed them "the Texicans" although the name never became official.

Tex and Shanghai appeared at very few WCW pay-per-view (PPV)s losing every time they were in the spotlight except for one occasion: Battlebowl in 1993. Tex and Shanghai found themselves on opposite sides in a “Lethal Lottery” tag-team match, which meant that one of them would actually get a PPV victory. Rick Rude and Shanghai Pierce won the match but Shanghai was quickly eliminated in the ensuing battle royal.

In their time in WCW, they helped put over future tag-team champions such as 2 Cold Scorpio and Marcus Alexander Bagwell and Cactus Jack and Maxx Payne. In 1994, Shanghai Pierce was unmasked during a bout with Johnny B. Badd and from that day forward appeared unmasked. Sometime after the summer of 1994, Tex and Shanghai left WCW; Shanghai was signed by the WWF while Tex worked a stint in the independent circuit that included a return to his old stomping grounds of the USWA.

=== The Godwinns (1996–1998) ===
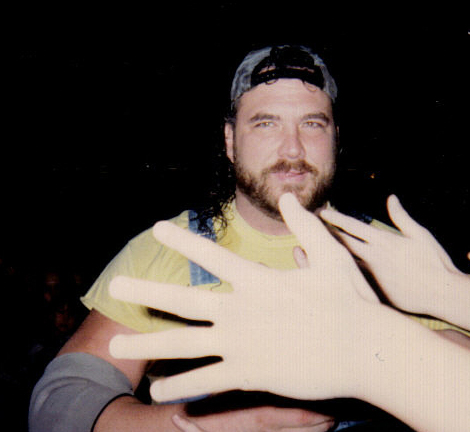
Mark Canterbury as Henry O. Godwinn in 1995

Canterbury had joined the WWF in late 1994 and been repackaged with a “Hog Farmer” gimmick and renamed “Henry O. Godwinn”. Canterbury first worked as a heel with the Million Dollar Corporation under Ted DiBiase’s management and then later as a face after being kicked out of the stable.

In the early parts of 1996, Dennis Knight was signed with the WWF and became “Phineas I. Godwinn”, originally billed as Henry's cousin, but later changed to Henry's brother. The team was managed by Hillbilly Jim and actually made their debut shortly before the tournament began to crown new tag team champions after Billy Gunn suffered a neck injury. The Godwinns made it all the way to the finals at WrestleMania XII where they lost to the Bodydonnas. The Godwinns feuded with the Bodydonnas for the next couple of months, not just over the tag team titles but because Phineas had become infatuated with the Bodydonnas' manager Sunny, something which initially worked against the Godwinns.

The Godwinns finally got their revenge on the Bodydonnas by winning the tag team titles from them in May 1996. Sunny also joined with them at this point, although she specifically joined to use Phineas and remain near the tag team gold. At In Your House 8: Beware of Dog, the Godwinns lost the titles to the Smoking Gunns, and Sunny moved on as she paired up with Billy Gunn and kept close to the tag team titles. The Godwinns would feud with the Gunns over the summer but would not regain the titles. For the rest of 1996, the Godwinns would remain a solid mid-card team.

During a match in April 1997, Henry Godwinn suffered a cracked C7 vertebra when the Legion of Doom botched a Doomsday Device.

Henry was told to take at least 15 weeks off to fully recover from the injury but returned in less than 8 weeks. Henry returned to active duty but acted more heelish and less cheerful, the team would slowly turn heel. They ditched their goofy pig farmer gimmick for that of bitter southern boys who wanted to hurt people like Henry got hurt. They also ditched their manager Hillbilly Jim and for a short time was without a manager. They eventually took Uncle Cletus as their manager and began attacking their opponents with their slop buckets. The turn and subsequent feud with the Headbangers would pay off as the Godwinns won tag gold once more on October 5, 1997 at Badd Blood. However, the title run was short-lived as they would lose the titles to the Legion of Doom only two days later in a retirement match thanks to a botched interference by Uncle Cletus. Following their loss, the Godwinns took out their frustration on Uncle Cletus by busting his head wide open, and he was never seen again in the WWF after that.

After the feud with the Legion of Doom ended, they engaged in a short feud with the returning Quebecers that failed to gain fan interest. The team began to flounder again with no real direction.

=== Southern Justice (1998) ===
As a result, the two were repackaged, thus ditching the Hillbilly gimmick and false names. On the June 1st, 1998 edition of Raw, the two adopted a "Southern Hired Gun" type of gimmick that saw them wear sharp suits and sunglasses and use their real names of Mark Canterbury and Dennis Knight for the first time and backing up Jeff Jarrett. The team was named "Southern Justice" and they backed up Jeff Jarrett in a feud with D-Generation X. They even clashed with D-X at the Breakdown: In Your House PPV where they lost to Billy Gunn, Road Dogg, and X-Pac.

Shortly after the PPV, Canterbury herniated his C7 vertebrae and pinched a spinal nerve; this necessitated spinal fusion surgery, a result of Canterbury returning to the ring before he should have. After the neck injury and spinal fusion, Canterbury left the WWF and retired from pro wrestling. Dennis Knight remained with the company until January 2001, repackaged as "Mideon" and later, "Naked Mideon".

=== Deep South Wrestling (2006–2007) ===
In September 2006, Canterbury wrestled several tryout matches with World Wrestling Entertainment. On September 15, 2006, WWE announced that he had been signed to a contract. He debuted in Deep South Wrestling on 30 November, as a tag partner for Ray Gordy. They wrestled a dark match before WWE SmackDown around this time. But the gimmick never came into fruition on the main roster. Gordy was known as Cousin Ray as the team used the ”Pigfarmer” gimmick; Gordy would later be moved to the SmackDown brand under the ring name "Jesse".

=== Reunion (2011–2012) ===
Both men came out of retirement in 2011 for Great Lakes Championship Wrestling in Wisconsin. Gimmicked as the Texas Hangmen, they lost to Demolition on December 3. A year later they lost to them again.

On November 22, 2020 they made an appearance at Survivor Series during The Undertaker's retirement ceremony.

== Championships and accomplishments ==
- World Wrestling Federation
  - WWF Tag Team Championship (2 times)
- Wrestling Observer Newsletter awards
  - Worst Tag Team (1996, 1997)
