= Breakdown: In Your House =

1998 World Wrestling Federation pay-per-view event

- Promotional poster featuring D-Generation X (from left to right: X-Pac, Triple H, Billy Gunn, Chyna, and Road Dogg)
- Promotion: World Wrestling Federation
- Date: September 27, 1998
- City: Hamilton, Ontario, Canada
- Venue: Copps Coliseum
- Attendance: 17,405
- Buy rate: 300,000

Pay-per-view chronology
| ← Previous; SummerSlam | Next → Judgment Day: In Your House |

In Your House chronology
| ← Previous; Fully Loaded | Next → Judgment Day |

WWE in Canada chronology
| ← Previous; Survivor Series | Next → Rock Bottom: In Your House |

Breakdown: In Your House was a 1998 professional wrestling pay-per-view (PPV) event produced by the American promotion World Wrestling Federation (WWF, renamed WWE in 2002). It was the 24th In Your House and took place on September 27, 1998, at the Copps Coliseum in Hamilton, Ontario, Canada. This was the fourth In Your House in Canada, after In Your House 4 in Winnipeg, Manitoba in October 1995, In Your House 9 in Vancouver, British Columbia in July 1996, and In Your House 16 in Calgary, Alberta in July 1997. The promotional poster featured D-Generation X, whose entrance theme was titled "Break It Down".

Nine matches were broadcast on the PPV, while three matches were held for the Sunday Night Heat pre-show. The main event was a triple threat match between defending champion "Stone Cold" Steve Austin, The Undertaker, and Kane for the WWF Championship, which ended in controversy when The Undertaker and Kane simultaneously pinned Austin. Another match at the event was a triple threat steel cage match between Ken Shamrock, Mankind, and The Rock to determine the number-one contender to the WWF Championship. The event was also notable for featuring the debut of Christian.

== Production ==
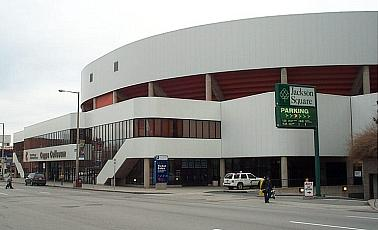
The 24th In Your House was held at the Copps Coliseum in Hamilton, Ontario, Canada.

=== Background ===
In Your House was a series of monthly professional wrestling pay-per-view (PPV) events first produced by the American company World Wrestling Federation (WWF, renamed WWE in 2002) in May 1995. They aired when the promotion was not holding one of its then-five major PPVs (WrestleMania, King of the Ring, SummerSlam, Survivor Series, and Royal Rumble) and were sold at a lower cost. The 24th In Your House, titled Breakdown: In Your House, was scheduled for September 27, 1998, at the Copps Coliseum in Hamilton, Ontario, Canada. It was the fourth In Your House in Canada, after In Your House 4 in Winnipeg, Manitoba in October 1995, In Your House 9 in Vancouver, British Columbia in July 1996, and In Your House 16 in Calgary, Alberta in July 1997. The name of the event was in reference to D-Generation X, whose entrance theme was called "Break It Down".

=== Storylines ===
The event comprised twelve professional wrestling matches with outcomes predetermined by the WWF's scriptwriters. The matches involved wrestlers portraying their characters in planned storylines that took place before, during, and after the event.

The main feud heading into the event was between "Stone Cold" Steve Austin, and Vince McMahon, who did not want Austin as the WWF Champion. On the September 5 episode of Raw Saturday Night McMahon criticized, and insulted The Undertaker, and Kane for failing to dethrone Austin. On the September 6 episode of Sunday Night Heat, McMahon apologized, and scheduled Austin to defend his title at Breakdown against both in a Triple Threat match. On the September 14 episode of Raw, McMahon added a stipulation that The Undertaker, and Kane could not pin each other. He then confronted Austin, who attacked him. The Undertaker and Kane broke up the attack and later that night interfered in Austin's match with Ken Shamrock. With the help of The Rock and Mankind, Austin fought off the attackers and chased after McMahon, who was watching from the aisle. On the September 21 episode of Raw, The Undertaker and Kane defeated Austin and Billy Gunn. After the match, Austin hit The Undertaker and Kane with a chair. McMahon made one more stipulation if anyone interfered in the match on Austin's behalf then Austin would automatically be stripped of the Title.

On the same night, to prevent Shamrock, The Rock, and Mankind from teaming with Austin, McMahon allowed them to win a shot at the WWF Championship in a Triple Threat match. The match ended in a no-contest when The Undertaker and Kane attacked the three contestants. The Triple Threat match was rescheduled for Breakdown. to be contested inside a steel cage.

Lower down the card, Dustin Runnels clashed with Val Venis. Dustin's new gimmick was that of an evangelist who preached against the vulgarity of the WWF's Attitude Era, mainly its violence, bloodlust, and sexual content, making Venis, whose gimmick was that of a porn star, a prime target. Venis responded the following evening on Raw with a film involving Runnels's wife, Terri, who had been absent for almost a year. On the September 13 episode of Sunday Night Heat, Dustin jumped through the crowd and attacked with a religious-themed sign, using the wood to choke him. The following week, Dustin, who was providing commentary, assaulted Venis, who was busy fighting Owen Hart, but Venis managed to tie him up in the ropes and deliver a promo further insinuating the details of his adulterous relationship with Terri.

== Event ==
Other on-screen personnel
| Role: | Name: |
|---|---|
| English commentators | Jim Ross |
| English commentators | Jerry Lawler |
| Spanish commentator | Carlos Cabrera |
| Spanish commentator | Hugo Savinovich |
| Ring announcer | Howard Finkel |
| Interviewers | Michael Cole |
| Interviewers | Dok Hendrix |
| Interviewers | Kevin Kelly |
| Referees | Mike Chioda |
| Referees | Jack Doan |
| Referees | Earl Hebner |
| Referees | Jim Korderas |
| Referees | Tim White |

Despite featuring prominently on the promotional poster, Triple H did not participate in the event, due to a legitimate knee injury.

Before the event officially began, three matches were taped for Sunday Night Heat. Golga defeated Mosh, The Hardy Boyz (Matt Hardy and Jeff Hardy) defeated Kaientai (Men's Teioh and Funaki), and 8-Ball from The Disciples of Apocalypse defeated Billy Gunn, and Skull from The Disciples of Apocalypse in a Triple Threat match.

The first match of the event was between Edge, and Owen Hart. Edge gained the early advantage after a dropkick. After Edge sent Hart outside the ring, Edge attempted a move from the apron, which Hart countered into a powerslam. Hart gained the advantage afterward until Edge performed an electric chair facebuster as Hart climbed the turnbuckles to regain the advantage. Hart eventually countered a suplex attempt into a bridging German suplex. Hart then missed an attack in the corner, and Edge attempted a superplex. Hart countered it into an inverted suplex slam from the turnbuckles. Hart then attempted the Sharpshooter, which Edge countered into a small package. After performing a spinning heel kick, Edge saw the debuting Christian at ringside. This distraction allowed Hart to pin Edge with a roll-up. After the match, Edge followed Christian into the crowd.

The second match was between Too Much (Brian Christopher and Scott Taylor), and the team of Al Snow, and Scorpio. After going back, and forth, Taylor performed a pumphandle suplex. Snow and Christopher tagged in, and Snow delivered trapping headbutts. Scorpio and Taylor tagged in. As Scorpio delivered corner clotheslines, Snow threw a steel chair into the ring. With Scorpio distracting the referee, Snow performed a calf kick with the chair. Scorpio then performed a dropkick with the chair to Christopher into Taylor. As Scorpio performed a splash to Taylor, Snow performed a moonsault on the outside from the security wall onto Christopher. As Scorpio was on the top turnbuckle, Christopher tripped him and performed a suplex on the outside. Taylor followed with a springboard axe handle. Back inside, Too Much performed a back body drop, and Christopher performed a bulldog to Scorpio. Scorpio then countered a back-body drop from Too Much into a double dropkick. Snow tagged in, and, as Scorpio distracted the referee, attacked Too Much with his mannequin head, also accidentally hitting Scorpio. Snow then performed a low blow to Taylor with the head. Christopher performed a Tennessee Jam onto Snow, Scorpio performed a flying clothesline to Christopher, and Snow finally pinned Taylor after a Snow Plow.

The third match was between Marc Mero (accompanied by Jacqueline) and Droz. Mero had the early advantage with punches and kicks. Droz came back with a flapjack and a dropkick. Mero left the ring and looked to leave as Droz came after him and attacked Mero with the guard rail and steps. Back in the ring, Mero performed a knee lift, but Droz performed a flying shoulder block and a clothesline. Mero then performed a backbody drop, sending Droz outside the ring. Mero followed with a suicide senton. Back inside, Droz blocked a slingshot splash attempt with his knees and followed with a flying spinning back elbow, an inverted atomic drop, and a power slam. As Droz went for the pin, Jacqueline placed Mero's foot on the bottom rope, stopping the count. Mero then came back with a clothesline and choked Droz with the athletic tape around his wrist. Mero then distracted the referee as Jacqueline hit Droz with the heel of her shoe from the top rope. Mero then pinned Droz after a Marvelocity.

The fourth match was a Falls Count Anywhere match between Vader and Bradshaw. Bradshaw gained the early advantage with attacks in the corner until Vader performed a clothesline, and a big splash. Bradshaw fought back with a big boot, and performed a clothesline, sending Vader outside the ring. Outside, Bradshaw attacked Vader with the ringpost and the ring bell, but Vader fought back using the ring steps. Back inside the ring, Bradshaw performed attacks in the corner, and a belly-to-back suplex. Vader then sent Bradshaw outside the ring, where Vader attacked Bradshaw using the guard rail, and delivered a low blow. Back inside, Vader performed a splash from the second rope, and a Vader Splash. Bradshaw fought back, performing a Clothesline from Hell, and pinned Vader after a neckbreaker slam.

The fifth match was between D'Lo Brown and Gangrel. The match went back and forth until Brown performed a low blow, and a running sitout powerbomb. Brown kept the advantage until Gangrel performed a flapjack onto the ropes. Mark Henry then came down to ringside as Gangrel performed a back body drop and a flying clothesline. As Gangrel ran at the ropes, Henry pulled down the ropes, sending Gangrel outside the ring. Brown distracted the referee as Henry sent Gangrel into the ringpost, and back into the ring. Brown then pinned Gangrel after a Sky High. After the match, Gangrel spat "blood" into Henry's face, attacked Brown, and performed an Impaler on Brown.

The sixth match was a Triple Threat match in a steel cage between Ken Shamrock, Mankind and The Rock. The match went back and forth between all three, and each was double-teamed. As Mankind and Shamrock double-teamed The Rock, The Rock fought back with a DDT to Mankind and a float-over DDT to Shamrock. The Rock then performed a scoop slam and a People's Elbow to both before climbing the cage. Mankind and Shamrock stopped and attacked The Rock. The Rock then performed a low blow to Shamrock and a Rock Bottom to Mankind. Shamrock fought back with a belly to belly suplex, and applied the ankle lock. Mankind stopped Shamrock and climbed to the top of the cage. The Rock followed but Mankind threw him off. Mankind then performed a diving elbow drop from the top of the cage, but The Rock avoided it. Shamrock then attempted to climb out the door, but Mankind held onto his leg. Shamrock brought a chair into the ring and attempted to hit Mankind. Mankind avoided it, performed a double-arm DDT on Shamrock, and hit him with the chair. As Mankind climbed the cage, The Rock pinned Shamrock to win the match, and become the number-one contender to the WWF Championship.

The seventh match was between Dustin Runnels and Val Venis (accompanied by Terri Runnels). Venis performed a spinebuster, but Runnels came back with a powerbomb. Venis knocked Runnels outside and attacked Runnels. As they re-entered the ring, Runnels performed a backbody drop, but Venis fought back with a Russian legsweep, and applied the camel clutch. Runnels blocked a suplex into his suplex, but Venis came back with a chinlock. Runnels fought back with a DDT and climbed the turnbuckles, but Venis threw him to the outside. They then went back and forth until Venis performed a power slam, several elbow drops, and pinned Runnels after a Money Shot.

The eighth match was between Jeff Jarrett and Southern Justice (Mark Canterbury and Dennis Knight), and D-Generation X (Billy Gunn, Road Dogg, and X-Pac). Gunn and Dogg attacked Jarrett and Southern Justice from behind during X-Pac's entrance. X-Pac and Jarrett started, with X-Pac countering a hurricanrana attempt into a powerbomb. Road Dogg tagged in but was dominated by Jarrett and Southern Justice after a cheap shot from Canterbury. X-Pac eventually tagged in after Road Dogg's head hit Jarrett's head. X-Pac was also dominated after Canterbury countered a spinning heel kick into a powerbomb. Jarrett applied the sleeper hold. X-Pac escaped, performed a belly-to-back suplex, and tagged in Gunn. Gunn fought off Jarrett and Southern Justice, and X-Pac performed the Bronco Buster on Jarrett. Jarrett tried to bring a guitar into the ring, but Gunn took it from him. The referee stopped Gunn from using the guitar, and Southern Justice double-teamed Gunn. Outside, Jarrett hit X-Pac in the head with the guitar, as Gunn pinned Knight after a Fameasser. X-Pac left holding onto his right eye.

The main event was a Triple Threat match between Kane, The Undertaker and "Stone Cold" Steve Austin for the WWF Championship. The Undertaker and Kane were prohibited from pinning each other. Another stipulation added was that if anyone caused interference on Austin's behalf, Austin would immediately be stripped of the title. During The Undertaker's entrance, Austin attacked him with a chair. Austin then fought off Kane using the chair and the ring post. Kane fought back, and threw Austin outside, where The Undertaker attacked him. Austin countered by sending The Undertaker into the ring steps and then pulled Kane's crotch into the ring post. Austin then performed the Stone Cold Stunner to Kane, but Undertaker pulled him out and sent him into the ringpost. Back in the ring, The Undertaker attacked Austin until Austin came back with a Lou Thesz press, and a swinging neckbreaker. Kane pulled Austin outside, and The Undertaker accidentally hit Kane. Austin then shoved The Undertaker into Kane and choked Kane with cables. The Undertaker then choked Austin with cables, and The Undertaker and Kane dominated Austin. As Austin was kicked outside, he took the chair and hit Kane, but then Undertaker hit Austin with the chair. Austin was dominated, but The Undertaker and Kane stopped each other from pinning Austin. Undertaker then fought with Kane until Kane and Austin double-teamed him. Austin sent The Undertaker outside and performed a Russian leg sweep on Kane. Kane fought back with a headbutt, and Austin was dominated again. The Undertaker and Kane stopped each other from pinning Austin, and they fought until they performed clotheslines to each other. Austin took advantage and attacked both. Austin attempted a Stone Cold Stunner on Kane but was shoved into The Undertaker, who performed a big boot. The Undertaker and Kane then performed a double chokeslam, and pinned Austin simultaneously. Austin lost the title, but no new champion was announced. Vince McMahon came to ringside, and took the title belt. McMahon left, and Austin followed him backstage. McMahon told Austin that he wasn't the champion anymore, and the title belt was his.

== Reception ==
The event has received mixed reviews from critics.

In 2008, J.D. Dunn of 411Mania gave the event a rating of 6.0 [Average], stating, "The seeds for Rockamania were planted here, and it launched Edge as a singles star -- before they decided to de-push him. Like a lot of 1998 stuff that was heavy on the Russo (Note: Vince Russo, head writer for WWF at the time, is known for his overuse of swerves.), it worked at the time but had a short shelf life. It might be worth a look for nostalgia, and for some historical reasons, but the wrestling leaves a lot to be desired. I'll be generous, and call it a mild thumbs up. Don't take it as a ringing endorsement or anything, though. Mildly recommended."

In 2018, Chris of Retro Pro Wrestling described the event as "odd," stating, "Though I can understand why not everybody was a fan of that main event, it was typical of the ‘f**k the rules’ brawling style that was so typical of the WWF main event scene at the time, and it worked pretty well. As for the show as a whole, this was an odd one. Outside of the last three matches, nothing much seemed to matter. Edge/Owen, MeroDroz, and D’Lo/Gangrel were as random as you could have asked for and didn’t seem to have any point to them, whilst the best thing about Venis/Runnels was seeing Terri looking stunning. Not that I’m saying this was a bad show. Most of the matches were decent enough, just not the kind of classics that would make it a must-see viewing 20 years later. If there is one reason to watch this show, it’s The Rock. This wasn’t the best he ever performed, but it was the first PPV where you saw that the former Rocky Maivia wasn’t just over, but was Main Event Superstar over, and during the hottest period in the company’s history, that’s saying something."

In 2022, Paul Matthews of Classic Wrestling Review described the event as "average," stating, "This show was average. Nothing on it was bad, but much of it was dull and flat. The first half was throwaway matches with little build. They developed the matches for the second half well. But the action was lackluster, except for the cage. Even the main event was disappointing. I didn’t hate it, but it was forgettable. However, I love the closing scene of the PPV. Despite the rest of the show, that final shot is memorable."

== Aftermath ==
The following night on Raw is War, McMahon attempted to announce a new WWF Champion. He held a presentation ceremony and introduced The Undertaker and Kane. After saying that both deserved to be the WWF Champion, Austin drove a Zamboni into the arena, and attacked McMahon before police officers stopped him, and arrested him. Because The Undertaker and Kane both failed to defend McMahon from Austin, McMahon did not name a new champion but instead made a match at Judgment Day between The Undertaker and Kane with Austin as the special referee. This prompted The Undertaker and Kane to attack Mr. McMahon, injuring his ankle because he gave them the finger behind their backs.

Due to the controversy with the WWF Championship, The Rock was not given a match for the title. The Nation of Domination disbanded shortly after Breakdown, and The Rock went on to feud with Nation members Mark Henry and D'Lo Brown before winning the WWF Championship at Survivor Series. Mankind and Shamrock feuded over the WWF Intercontinental Championship after Shamrock won the title in an eight-man tournament. Mankind and The Rock continued their feud after The Rock won the WWF Championship. This would be the final Pay-per-view appearance for both Henry O. Godwinn and Vader, the former due to injury and the latter due to creative differences.

Owen Hart would "quit" the WWF after injuring (kayfabe) Dan "The Beast" Severn on Raw Is War via a reverse piledriver (similar to the move that legitimately injured "Stone Cold" Steve Austin the previous year) but would return after a short absence in his Blue Blazer persona, though more of a heel than the previous incarnation of the character. Severn would return for the 1999 Royal Rumble then leave the WWF shortly afterward to resume his UFC career (as well as defend his NWA World Heavyweight title).

== Results ==
| No. | Results | Stipulations | Times |
|---|---|---|---|
| 1^{H} | Golga (with Giant Silva, Kurrgan, and Luna Vachon) defeated Mosh (with Thrasher) | Singles match | 2:02 |
| 2^{H} | The Hardy Boyz (Jeff Hardy and Matt Hardy) defeated Kaientai (Funaki and Men's Teioh) (with Yamaguchi-san) | Tag team match | 3:36 |
| 3^{H} | 8-Ball (with Paul Ellering) defeated Billy Gunn and Skull (with Paul Ellering) | Triple threat match | 3:20 |
| 4 | Owen Hart defeated Edge | Singles match | 9:16 |
| 5 | Al Snow and Scorpio (with Head) defeated Too Much (Brian Christopher and Scott Taylor) | Tag team match | 8:03 |
| 6 | Marc Mero (with Jacqueline) defeated Droz | Singles match | 5:12 |
| 7 | Bradshaw defeated Vader | Falls Count Anywhere match | 7:56 |
| 8 | D'Lo Brown defeated Gangrel | Singles match | 7:46 |
| 9 | The Rock defeated Ken Shamrock and Mankind via pinfall | Triple threat steel cage match to determine the #1 contender to the WWF Championship | 18:47 |
| 10 | Val Venis (with Terri Runnels) defeated Dustin Runnels | Singles match | 9:09 |
| 11 | D-Generation X (Billy Gunn, Road Dogg, and X-Pac) defeated Jeff Jarrett and Southern Justice (Dennis Knight and Mark Canterbury) | Six-man tag team match | 11:17 |
| 12 | Kane and The Undertaker defeated "Stone Cold" Steve Austin (c) by double pinfall | Triple threat match for the WWF Championship; Kane and Undertaker were prohibited from defeating each other. Had anyone interfered on Austin's behalf, Austin would have been immediately stripped of the title. | 22:05 |
(c) / – the champion(s) heading into the match; H / – the match was broadcast prior to the pay-per-view on Sunday Night Heat
