= Rock Bottom: In Your House =

1998 World Wrestling Federation pay-per-view event

- Promotional poster featuring The Rock performing the "Rock Bottom" on Road Dogg
- Promotion: World Wrestling Federation
- Date: December 13, 1998
- City: Vancouver, British Columbia, Canada
- Venue: General Motors Place
- Attendance: 20,042
- Buy rate: 290,000

Pay-per-view chronology
← Previous; Capital Carnage	Next → Royal Rumble

In Your House chronology
← Previous; Judgment Day	Next → St. Valentine's Day Massacre

WWE in Canada chronology
← Previous; Breakdown: In Your House	Next → WrestleMania X8

Rock Bottom: In Your House was a 1998 professional wrestling pay-per-view (PPV) event produced by the American promotion World Wrestling Federation (WWF, renamed WWE in 2002). It was the 26th In Your House and took place on December 13, 1998, at General Motors Place in Vancouver, British Columbia, Canada. This was the second In Your House at the venue, after In Your House 9 in July 1996, and fifth In Your House in Canada overall, including In Your House 4 in Winnipeg, Manitoba in October 1995, In Your House 16 in Calgary, Alberta in July 1997, and Breakdown: In Your House in Hamilton, Ontario in September 1998. The event was named after The Rock's finishing move, the "Rock Bottom".

The main event featured "Stone Cold" Steve Austin facing The Undertaker in a Buried Alive match for a spot in the 1999 Royal Rumble match. The main match on the undercard was between The Rock and Mankind for the WWF Championship.

== Production ==
=== Background ===
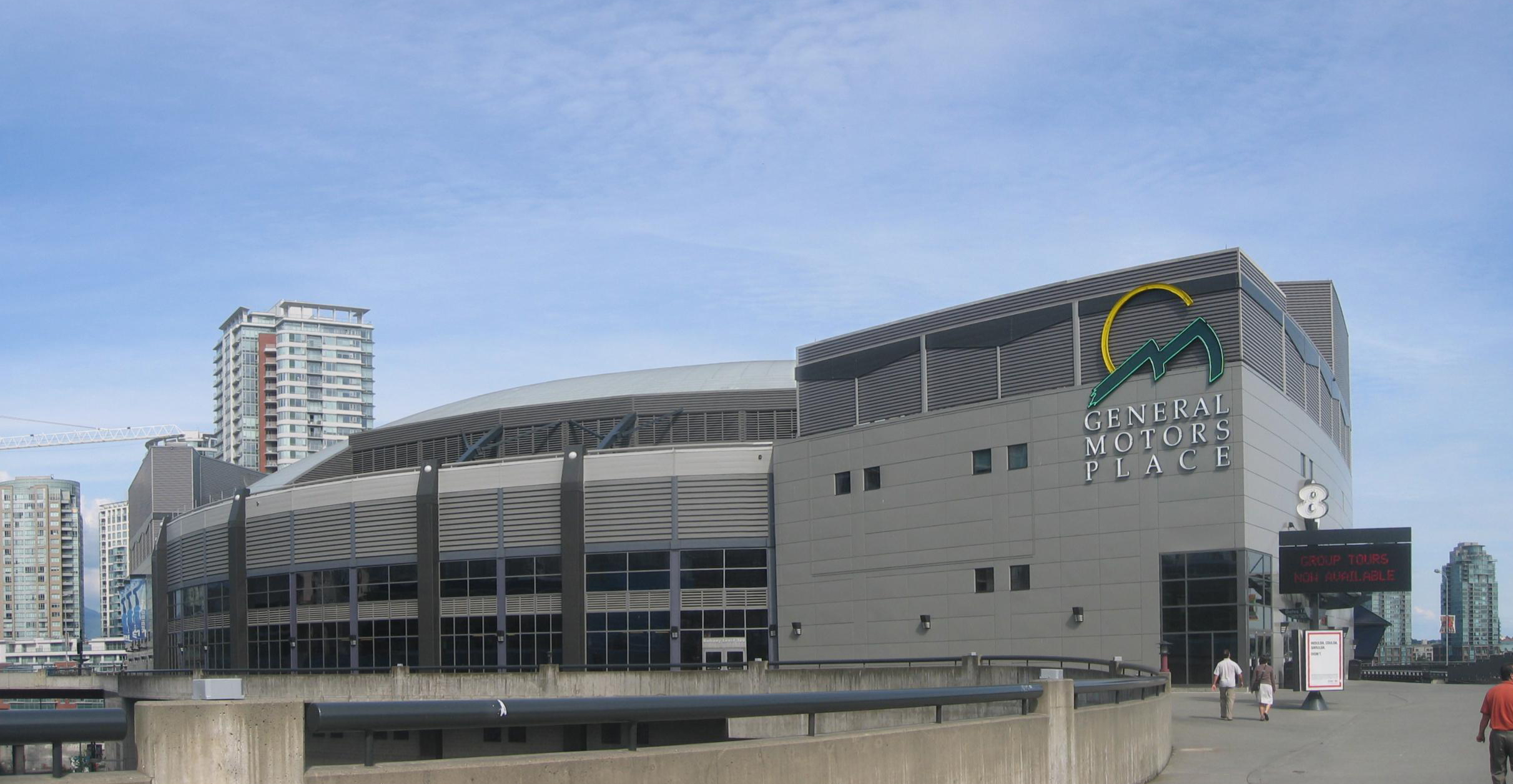
The 26th In Your House was the second time for the event to be held at General Motors Place in Vancouver, British Columbia, Canada, after In Your House 9 in July 1996.

In Your House was a series of monthly professional wrestling pay-per-view (PPV) events first produced by the American company World Wrestling Federation (WWF, renamed WWE in 2002) in May 1995. They aired when the promotion was not holding one of its then-five major PPVs (WrestleMania, King of the Ring, SummerSlam, Survivor Series, and Royal Rumble) and were sold at a lower cost.

The 26th In Your House, titled Rock Bottom: In Your House, was scheduled for December 13, 1998, at General Motors Place in Vancouver, British Columbia, Canada. This was the second In Your House at the venue, after In Your House 9 in July 1996, and fifth In Your House in Canada overall, including In Your House 4 in Winnipeg, Manitoba in October 1995, In Your House 16 in Calgary, Alberta in July 1997, and Breakdown: In Your House in Hamilton, Ontario in September 1998. The event was named after The Rock's finishing move, the "Rock Bottom". The Rock himself was also involved in a prominent match on the card.

=== Storylines ===
When The Nation split up, D'Lo Brown and Mark Henry were left as a tag team, with Henry's gimmick being that of the ladies man Sexual Chocolate. When Terri Runnels revealed she was pregnant, Val Venis admitted to having a vasectomy and disowned her, aligning himself with The Godfather by virtue of his pimp gimmick. Jacqueline had also been ditched by her partner Marc Mero and so she formed Pretty Mean Sisters with Runnels, putting their needs first and ostensibly being seduced by Mark Henry.

The Headbangers turned heel in November. The Oddities had come to the ring with Insane Clown Posse, who sung their entrance theme at the time and when The Headbangers came to the ring, they joined in dancing with the stable. However, after spraying silly string into the crowd, they then sprayed into the eyes of The Oddities and since then had been utilising weapons and other underhand tactics to win matches. Most notably, they challenged Insane Clown Posse to a match but the two asked The Oddities to substitute for them before the Posse attacked Oddities and helped The Headbangers win.

On September 28, Owen Hart (kayfabe) broke Dan Severn's neck with a piledriver. He announced the following week that he would retire from professional wrestling, however at exactly the same time a lucha libre type character started making appearances called The Blue Blazer. The Blazer was a gimmick of Hart's in the late '80s and this did not escape the fans, or the attention of Steve Blackman. The Blazer began to regularly interfere in matches, using moves that were associated with Hart and eventually Blackman caught up with The Blue Blazer backstage, trying to rip off his mask and prove that it was Hart. When he did this, however, Hart came at Blackman from behind and locked in his dragon sleeperhold. A variety of repeated attacks continued to occur, with The Blazer attacking Blackman, or Blackman attacking The Blazer only for Hart to use this as a distraction to further beat Blackman until on December 7 he officially came out of retirement to meet Blackman at the event.

On December 6's Sunday Night Heat, the sexually charged Goldust challenged Jeff Jarrett to a match in which, if he won, Jarrett's business-like valet Debra would have to strip naked. Jarrett accepted the match on the condition that without a valet, should Goldust lose he would have to do the same. The following evening on Raw, Goldust came to the ring in just a trenchcoat, flashing Jarrett and causing him to lose his match while later in the evening Debra would do the same to Goldust, but as his opponent Owen Hart was also distracted, it actually helped him win the match.

The feud for the WWF Championship began one month earlier when The Rock had won the title in controversy at Survivor Series when he put Mankind in the Sharpshooter submission and Vince McMahon forced the referee to ring the bell, despite former promises McMahon had made to Mankind. Commissioner Shawn Michaels gave Mankind a match for the title when he revealed that his ties to The Corporation were not as secure as initially thought. Before the event, on Sunday Night Heat Mankind attacked the champion during an interview, damaging his ribs. Mankind, meanwhile, had a contract saying if the Championship was not defended then he would win it by default and throughout the evening McMahon tried to convince him to relinquish the contract.

Although initially a feud of respect, animosity between The Undertaker and "Stone Cold" Steve Austin arose when Austin lost his WWF Championship in an effective handicap match also including The Undertaker's (kayfabe) brother Kane. Despite both men being screwed at the Survivor Series tournament, Austin received a title match the next evening but amongst a myriad interferences from other wrestlers, The Undertaker came to the ring and hit Austin with a shovel. Despite continuing, Austin eventually passed out at a house show the following Saturday and was admitted into hospital. A live feed from the hospital was used in order for Austin to be interviewed on Raw is War, but during one of the interview segments The Undertaker arrived at the hospital with Paul Bearer, kidnapping him and attempting to bury him alive before changing his mind and embalming him instead. However, just as Undertaker was chanting ceremoniously, Kane burst in and attacked the two of them allowing Austin to make his escape. Wanting to further distance Austin from the WWF Championship, Mr. McMahon capitalized on the rivalry between them, booking them in a Buried Alive match with the winner receiving a spot in the Royal Rumble. The mind games between the two intensified as the weeks went on, with Austin finding an unlikely ally in Kane, who was being chased by asylum orderlies, by directing them towards Undertaker and having him incarcerated, leaving Paul Bearer stranded and eventually thrown down a sewer and Undertaker retaliating the following week on December 7 by ending a tag team match, also featuring Mankind and Rock, by crucifying Austin in front of the TitanTron.

== Event ==
Other on-screen personnel
Role:	Name:
English commentators	Michael Cole
English commentators	Jerry Lawler
Spanish commentators	Carlos Cabrera
Spanish commentators	Hugo Savinovich
Interviewer	Kevin Kelly
Ring announcer	Howard Finkel
Referees	Mike Chioda
Referees	Earl Hebner
Referees	Jim Korderas
Referees	Jack Doan
Referees	Tim White

D'Lo Brown offered little resistance to Val Venis or Godfather when he was tagged in. Similarly when Mark Henry was tagged in, he was thrown around the ring and received the Ho Train from Godfather. He managed to reverse an Irish whip, though, and began to slam Godfather around the ring. Despite Venis tagging in, Henry still remained dominant and tagged in his own partner, Brown who successfully took down Venis with the Sky High. The match was effectively reset when Brown missed the Lo Down causing him and Venis both to crawl to their partners slowly. With Godfather in the ring, Brown was thrown out as Mark Henry received a double team suplex. Although Venis continued to dominate Henry in the ring, a fight outside the ring between The Godfather's Hos and PMS distracted the referee while Jacqueline pulled down Venis' trunks, distracting him and allowing Henry to push him over and finish him with a big splash followed by a pin.

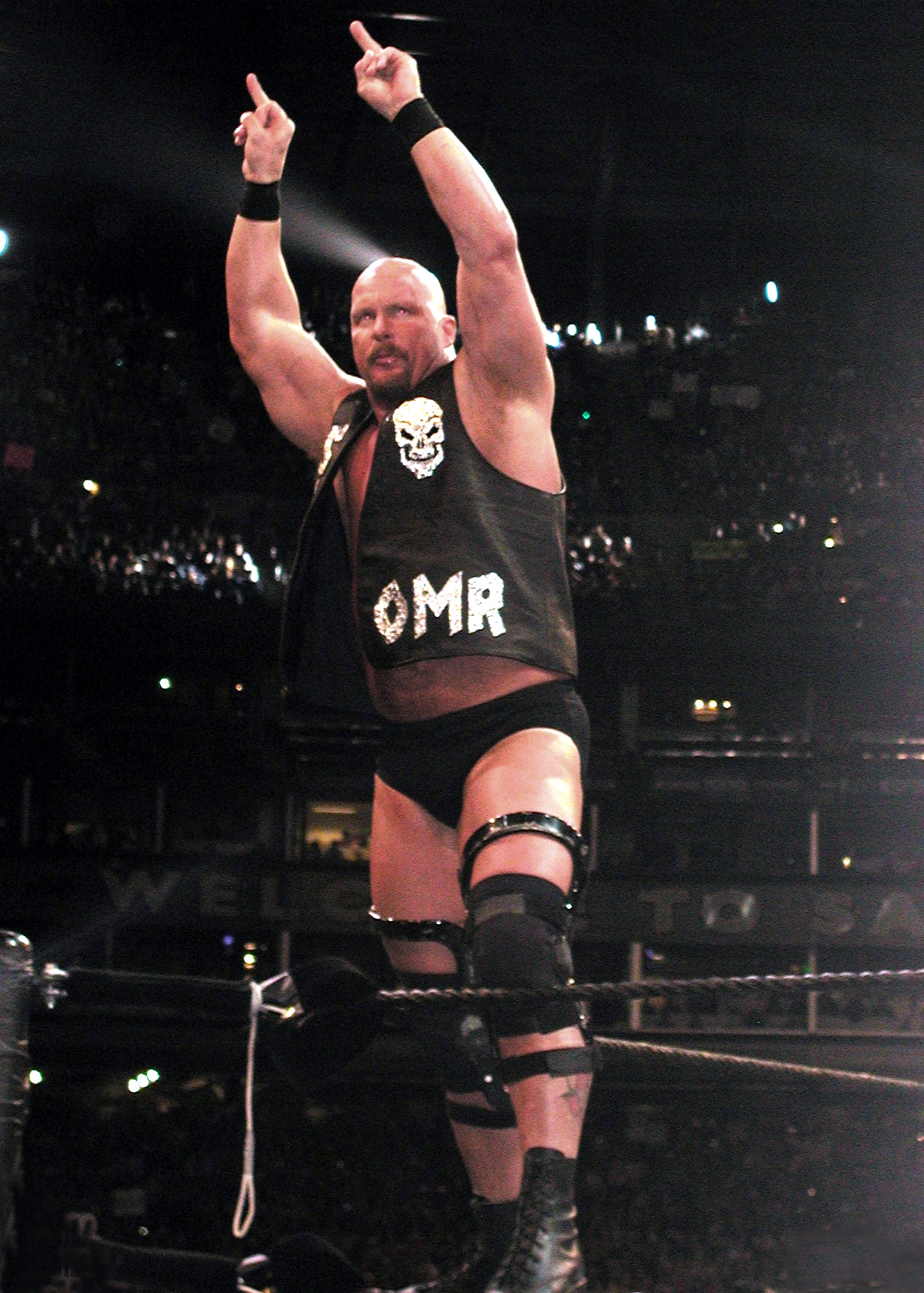
"Stone Cold" Steve Austin, who faced The Undertaker in the main event.

Mosh fought his way out of the corner to begin the match, jumping over the turnbuckle to pull Kurrgan's neck onto the top ropes. When Mosh tried to jump on Kurrgan, though, he used his height to catch Mosh and slam him into the mat. Mosh fled to tag in his partner, Thrasher, who similarly felt the mat with a sidewalk slam. Golga briefly used his weight with seated sentons and leg drops to further take out Thrasher but when Kurrgan was brought back in, he missed a splash and both Headbangers teamed up to suplex him, following up with a frog leap. Being dominated, Kurrgan desperately tagged in Golga who managed to turn things round, utilizing running jumps again to take out Thrasher, but Mosh made a blind tag and while Golga was busy missile dropkicked him and followed with a pin while Thrasher held Kurrgan's leg to prevent him from breaking up the pincount.

Steve Blackman entered the ring on the receiving end of floor kicks from Owen Hart who then suplexed him. Blackman was able to counter an Irish whip and forced Hart into the corner, clotheslining him then kicking him out of the ring as Hart tried to flee. Blackman brought him back into the ring to deliver a snap suplex and a backbreaker before locking an Indian crossbow hold. When Hart would not tap he released him and tried to use his leg in a throw but received an enzuigiri which allowed Hart to dominate again, teasing a Sharpshooter but merely kicking him in the torso. After a low blow in the corner and an inverted atomic drop, Hart suplexed Blackman and climbed the ropes for a diving elbow drop. When Blackman would not be pinned, Hart tried to secure him with a sleeper hold but Blackman stood up out of it and regained some momentum, the two clashing with kicks and throws. Hart untied the turnbuckle pad but found himself thrown into it, Blackman then jumping out of the ring to drag Hart's neck onto the top rope. He climbed back in the ring and Hart countered a sleeper with the Dragon Sleeper. Hart followed this with a DDT but when he tried a flying move, Blackman was able to side step him and lock Hart in his own move, the Sharpshooter. Hart crawled for the rope break and then left the ring in pain; Blackman initially followed to fight him but became aware of the referee's count and ran into the ring to win via count out.

In a tag team match between The Brood and The J.O.B. Squad, Edge found himself in trouble early at the hands of Bob Holly but managed to put Holly on his shoulders for an electric chair giving him time to tag in Christian who could not capitalize, receiving a double underhook powerbomb before Scorpio) was tagged in. After slamming Christian on the mat and securing a somersault leg drop, he tagged in Al Snow who utilized his headbutts to continue dominating Christian. Christian tagged in Gangrel who had more success with Snow, slowly isolating him from the rest of the J.O.B. Squad and keeping him in their corner allowing all three members of The Brood to illegally team up on Snow before Edge wrestled him in earnest in the middle of the ring. Despite taking an enziguiri, Edge managed to clamp Snow's leg so that he could tag in Gangrel but still isolate Snow. Snow managed to counter both of them though, with a spinebuster to Edge, and tagged in Scorpio who met with Christian though soon all six men were in the ring. With the referee distracted, Snow used Head on Christian and Scorpion almost won after Dropping The Bomb but Edge stopped the pin count, then using Gangrel's back to help jump over the ropes to take out the rest of the JOB Squad outside the ring. Stranded on his own, Scorpio took an Impaler from Christian and was pinned.

The fifth match of the night involved Jeff Jarrett accompanied by Debra going up against Goldust with the stipulation that if Goldust won, Debra would have to strip naked, but if Jarrett won, Goldust would to do the same. Jeff Jarrett was initially dominant in his match, using underhand tactics, on Goldust and despite being rolled over in a crossbody, controlled much of the early match mostly with kicks and punches. A neckbreaker and a dropkick could not keep Goldust down, much to Jarrett's dismay and neither could a number of successive sleeper holds. Goldust was taken all the way down to the mat before finding the power to stand up with enough momentum to back drop Jarrett. Debra tried to aid Jarrett by picking up his guitar but when Goldust ducked she almost hit Jarrett with it. Goldust took advantage with an inverted lifted DDT but referee Jack Doane was too busy reprimanding Debra to make the pinfall. Goldust positioned Jarrett for Shattered Dreams and while Debra tried to distract Goldust from doing it, she actually distracted the referee allowing Goldust to perform the illegal move. Jarrett fell out of the ring though, and had to be counted out allowing Debra to strike Goldust down with the guitar making him dazed enough for Jarrett to pin him after hitting him with The Stroke. After the match Commissioner Michaels came to the ring to send Jarrett to the back and ostensibly oversee Goldust stripping. However, he declared Debra to have disqualified Jarrett making her the loser and forcing her to strip to her bra and panties. Before she could take off her bra though Jarrett and the Blue Blazer appeared, covering Debra with the Blazer's cape.

The next match involved The New Age Outlaws defending their WWF Tag Team Championship against The Corporation being represented by (Big Boss Man and Ken Shamrock) (with Shawn Michaels) in their corner. Ken Shamrock controlled Road Dogg in the beginning of the match, with Big Boss Man helping through the ropes. Billy Gunn had to save Road Dogg from Shamrock's ankle lock, becoming the legal man only to also suffer Shamrock's rage until he floored Shamrock with a FameAsser. Despite tagging in the fresh Road Dogg, the Outlaws were once again on the backfoot after a belly to belly slam suplex after which Boss Man used his size to control Road Dogg, jumping on him and into him in the corner. Road Dogg remained isolated, being taken to his corner only to taunt Gunn but not allowed to tag despite some punching reversals. After Boss Man used his body to attack Dogg and Shamrock used a mixture of suplex slams and clotheslines Dogg finally managed to tag Gunn but Boss Man had the referee distracted, with Gunn almost taking out his rage on Shawn Michaels, for which he'd be fired. Boss Man tried to piledrive Road Dogg but was back body dropped out of the ring, rather than tag in Road Dogg elbow dropped on Boss Man but as he tried to climb back into the ring he was held to the floor with Shamrock kicking him. Back inside the ring Road Dogg crawled to his corner and despite having his foot held managed to tag in Gunn on who reversed Shamrock's hurricanrana attempt into a powerbomb. Michaels pulled out the referee when the three count was made allowing Boss Man to strike Gunn with a night stick. Shamrock could not make a pin though and despite Michaels pulling at Gunn's feet in the middle of a suplex, causing him to fall with Shamrock on top of him, Gunn managed to roll over with a pin and retain the titles.

The WWF Championship match was delayed when Mankind tried to have Vince McMahon and The Rock admit that he had not submitted at the previous event. When they refused to, Mankind ripped up his contract allowing Rock to skip the match and started brutally attacking Rock, smacking his head around the ring before taking him inside the ring and running him into the turnbuckles. McMahon then told referee Mike Chioda to disqualify Mankind for any kind of offense, no matter how small. While Mankind was distracted with Mr. McMahon talking, Rock recovered and clotheslined Mankind, taking him to the outside and using the steel steps against him before suplexing him. When they returned to the ring Mankind almost recovered, but as he went to perform an elbow drop from the turnbuckle, Shane McMahon held down his foot stopping him from jumping and letting Rock drag him to the ground, leaving him so injured that Rock had enough time to join the commentary team as he recovered. After being spat at in the face, Mankind jumped over the announce table into The Rock and then went to use a steel chair only to be stopped by Chioda. Rock, though, had no such restraints and launched Mankind into the chair with a DDT. When they returned to the ring Rock scooped Mankind into position for the Corporate Elbow but could not successfully secure the pin afterward. When they resumed fighting Mankind managed to fight back eventually headbutting Rock's crotch. Vince then reminded the referee he was to disqualify Mankind for any offense but before he could call for the bell, Mankind grabbed him and knocked him out with a piledriver. Vince then called for the bell himself but Mankind attacked the time keeper too. Rock chased Mankind round the ring and back inside, launching a chair shot and then the eponymous Rock Bottom on him but with no referee to make the call. Shane McMahon came into the ring with the Championship belt to strike Mankind, but he ducked and The Rock was struck, allowing Mankind to cover the champion. By the time replacement referee Tim White made it to the ring Rock was able to kick out, doing the same after a double-armed DDT. Mankind then stuffed a smelly sock in the Rock's mouth, which forced the Rock to pass out. The referee called for the bell, and Mankind was declared the winner. However, before Mankind could be announced as the new champion, Vince McMahon took the microphone and explained that because the Rock did not submit to the hold, the Rock would remain the champion. In response, Mankind attacked Vince and shoved Mr. Socko down his gullet, then doing the same to Shane before attacking Pat Patterson and Gerald Brisco until Corporation members Shamrock and Boss Man subdued him.

The final match was a Buried Alive match between "Stone Cold" Steve Austin and The Undertaker for the right to compete in the 1999 Royal Rumble Match. The two fought back down the walkway towards the ring, Austin smashing Undertaker's head into the crowd barrier and the ring post. Undertaker replied by elbowing him to gain some time, knocking him to the floor with a chair shot and then putting him in the ring only to be clotheslined back out. He returned, undeterred and caught a running Austin by the throat, chokeslamming him. Undertaker then dragged a completely spent Austin up the walkway towards the burial site, pushing him in the grave. Undertaker then started grabbing the soil by hand and piling it on top of Austin, "Stone Cold" slowly climbed out though and met Undertaker's attempt to stop him by hitting him with a jerrycan. Undertaker fell into the grave with a Stone Cold Stunner and Austin poured a wheelbarrow of soil on him. Austin then left the front of the arena and in the meantime Undertaker sat up, climbing out of the grave. As Undertaker was recovering on the mound, an explosion came from inside the grave and Kane climbed out and began to fight Undertaker on the soil. Undertaker almost eliminated Kane with a tombstone piledriver but was distracted when Austin returned to the arena, driving a backhoe loader causing Undertaker to drop his brother in confusion. Kane seized on the opportunity to utilize the tombstone piledriver on Undertaker, pushing him into the open grave afterwards. Austin then came out of the digger and instructed the driver to drop the soil on Undertaker. It was still not enough to cover him though and Austin had to shovel some more soil on his opponent before going to the back then returning with some cans of beer, at which point he was declared the winner. After celebrating in the ring, he returned to the grave to pour some beer on the Undertaker as the digger continued to pile on soil.

== Reception ==
The event has received generally negative reviews from critics.

In 2008, J.D. Dunn of 411Mania gave the event a rating of 3.5 [Bad], stating, "How bad was this PPV? Steve Blackman was in the best match. I don't think Debra's all that attractive, so the stips for the Jarrett/Goldust match didn't mean much to me outside of drawing heat. The rest was just [God-awful] boring. Unfortunately, while their TV would heat up to the point where they were beating the NBA nearly 7-to-1, the PPVs would continue to flounder off and on until into the summer. Thumbs way down here."

In 2016, Kevin Pantoja of 411Mania gave the event a rating of 2.5 [Very Bad], stating, "Considering how successful the year of 1998 was for the WWF, it kind of sucks to see the PPV side end on such a whimper. Outside of the WWF Title match, nothing on this show is really any good. There are two decent matches hidden in there but this is an easy skip. Even the main event, which the WWF was mostly nailing at the time, is an abysmal waste of time."

In 2019, CJ of Retro Pro Wrestling described the event as "OK, but nothing special," stating, "This is one of those shows that you keep waiting to get better. Instead, you find yourself sitting there, match after match thinking 'yeah, that was OK, but nothing special.' That was the frustrating thing about this show. Every match was decent in its own right and nothing was particularly terrible. Even the match involving The Oddities had at least some entertainment value, but other than that, there was nothing that was must-see." He praised the WWF Championship between The Rock and Mankind as an exception.

== Aftermath ==
The Rock and Mankind continued to feud with each other over the WWF Championship throughout the beginning of 1999. Mankind won his first WWF Championship on the January 4 episode of Raw is War by defeating The Rock in the main event thanks to interference by "Stone Cold" Steve Austin. The pre-taped episode was a turning point in the ratings war between WWF and rival promotion WCW; WCW Senior Vice President Eric Bischoff ordered announcer Tony Schiavone to give away the result on a live episode of WCW Monday Nitro that same night, which Schiavone did whilst sarcastically remarking "that'll put some butts in seats!", prompting 600,000 viewers to switch from Nitro to Raw so they could see Mankind's victory. This also coincided with the Fingerpoke of Doom, another controversial WCW angle that saw Hollywood Hogan win the WCW World Heavyweight Championship in a screwjob and the subsequent re-unification of the New World Order. Mankind lost the WWF title back to The Rock in a brutal "I Quit" match at the Royal Rumble. Rock and Mankind traded the belt back-and-forth until WrestleMania XV, when The Rock finally lost the WWF Championship to Austin, with Mankind serving as the special guest referee.

On the December 14 episode of Raw is War, The Rock defended his WWF Championship against Triple H, but due to interference from The Corporation and the debuting Test, The Rock retained his title. That same night, the New Age Outlaws lost their WWF World Tag Team titles to the Corporate team of Ken Shamrock and Big Boss Man, who would retain them until January 1999, when they would lose the titles to Jeff Jarrett & Owen Hart, the last title Hart would hold before his death following an in-ring accident.

This would be the last WWF pay-per-view in Vancouver until 2024, when the now-renamed WWE would hold Survivor Series: WarGames in this arena, which had been renamed to Rogers Arena in 2010.

== Results ==
No.	Results	Stipulations	Times
1^{H}	Duane Gill (c) (with Al Snow, Scorpio, and Bob Holly) defeated Matt Hardy (with Jeff Hardy)	Singles match for the WWF Light Heavyweight Championship	1:02
2^{H}	Kevin Quinn defeated Brian Christopher	Singles match	2:23
3^{H}	The New Age Outlaws (Billy Gunn and Road Dogg) defeated The Acolytes (Bradshaw and Faarooq) by disqualification	Tag team match	2:00
4^{H}	Triple H (with Billy Gunn, Chyna, and Road Dogg) defeated Droz (with Animal)	Singles match	1:37
5	D'Lo Brown and Mark Henry (with Jacqueline and Terri Runnels) defeated The Godfather and Val Venis	Tag team match	5:54
6	The Headbangers (Mosh and Thrasher) defeated The Oddities (Golga and Kurrgan) (with Giant Silva and Luna Vachon)	Tag team match	6:29
7	Steve Blackman defeated Owen Hart by countout	Singles match	10:26
8	The Brood (Gangrel, Edge, and Christian) defeated The J.O.B. Squad (Al Snow, Bob Holly, and Scorpio) (with Head)	Six-man tag team match	9:08
9	Goldust defeated Jeff Jarrett (with Debra) by disqualification	"Strip Tease" match	8:06
10	The New Age Outlaws (Billy Gunn and Road Dogg) (c) defeated The Corporation (Big Boss Man and Ken Shamrock) (with Shawn Michaels)	Tag team match for the WWF Tag Team Championship	16:10
11	Mankind defeated The Rock (c) (with Mr. McMahon and Shane McMahon) by referee stoppage	Singles match for the WWF Championship	13:35
12	"Stone Cold" Steve Austin defeated The Undertaker (with Paul Bearer) by burying Undertaker alive	Buried Alive match for the right to compete in the 1999 Royal Rumble match	21:33
(c) / – the champion(s) heading into the match; H / – the match was broadcast prior to the pay-per-view on Sunday Night Heat
