= In Your House =

WWE pay-per-view and livestreaming event series

- NXT In Your House 2022 logo
- Promotion: WWE
- Brand: NXT (2020–2022)
- Other names: NXT TakeOver: In Your House (2020–2021); NXT In Your House (2022)
- First event: In Your House (May 1995)
- Last event: NXT In Your House (2022)

In Your House was a series of professional wrestling supercard events created by WWE, a professional wrestling promotion based in Connecticut. The events originally aired on pay-per-view (PPV) from May 1995 to February 1999 when the promotion was still called the World Wrestling Federation (WWF; renamed WWE in 2002). In 2020, WWE revived In Your House for its developmental brand NXT. The 2020 event was streamed exclusively on the WWE Network with the 2021 event also available via traditional PPV and the livestreaming service Peacock, while the 2022 event was only available via WWE's livestreaming platforms. A total of 30 In Your House events were held between May 1995 and June 2022.

The original concept of the In Your House series was that in the months when the promotion was not holding one of its then-five major PPV events (WrestleMania, SummerSlam, King of the Ring, Royal Rumble, and Survivor Series), it would offer a two-hour PPV for a lower price. In Your House was established in response to a move by competitor World Championship Wrestling to increase its annual PPV events. The In Your House branding was retired following February 1999's St. Valentine's Day Massacre: In Your House event, as the company moved to install permanent names for each of its monthly PPVs, which began with Backlash. After 21 years and in response to the COVID-19 pandemic, WWE revived In Your House for NXT in 2020 and it was subsequently held annually in June until its final event in 2022. The 2020 and 2021 events were held under the NXT TakeOver series, but after TakeOver's discontinuation in late 2021, the final In Your House was a standalone event for NXT.

== History ==
The first In Your House pay-per-view (PPV) was held on May 14, 1995, in Syracuse, New York at Upstate Medical University Arena (then known as Oncenter War Memorial Arena). To promote this first event, the World Wrestling Federation (WWF, now WWE) held a sweepstakes to give away a new house in Orlando, Florida. The original concept of In Your House was that in the months when the WWF was not holding one of its then-five major PPV events (WrestleMania, King of the Ring, SummerSlam, Survivor Series, and Royal Rumble, which at the time ran for three hours and retailed for US$29.95), they would offer a two-hour PPV, priced at US$14.95. The price was raised to US$19.95 starting in December 1995 with In Your House 5. The WWF did this in response to a move by competitor World Championship Wrestling (WCW) to increase their annual pay-per-view events (in 1995, WCW held 9 PPV events, then 10 in 1996, and finally started airing monthly events in 1997). Notwithstanding the addition of more WWF events, WCW's events regularly ran between 2.5–3 hours. Starting with Ground Zero: In Your House in September 1997, the WWF expanded all of its In Your House events to three hours, thus matching the runtime of its major PPV events.

The first six In Your House events were not promoted with subtitles, which were retroactively added (shown below in the table in small print), sometimes making use of a tagline. The first event to officially use a subtitle was the seventh event, In Your House 7: Good Friends, Better Enemies. From September 1997 onwards, the subtitles replaced the In Your House label as the main titles (e.g., the PPV was not named "In Your House: Ground Zero", but instead, "Ground Zero: In Your House"), until regular named shows such as Backlash took over in 1999. The In Your House branding was retired following February 1999's St. Valentine's Day Massacre: In Your House event, as the company moved to install permanent names for each of its monthly events, which began with Backlash. Early advertising for that year's Backlash featured the "In Your House" branding until it was quietly dropped in the weeks leading to the pay-per-view. Following this, several of the In Your House shows were rebranded as their own PPV chronologies, including Over the Edge, Fully Loaded, Unforgiven, No Way Out, Judgment Day, and Bad Blood.

In 2002, the WWF was renamed to World Wrestling Entertainment (WWE), and in 2011, the promotion ceased using its full name, with WWE becoming an orphaned initialism. On May 13, 2020, WWE announced that the In Your House branding would be revived for the NXT brand division as an NXT TakeOver event entitled TakeOver: In Your House on June 7, which aired exclusively on WWE's online streaming service, the WWE Network. The announcement and the event marked the 25th anniversary of the first In Your House PPV. The event featured homages to the WWF in the early 90's, including a recreation of the house-themed stage used during the earlier In Your House events, and Adam Cole appearing in a parody of the commercials for ICOPRO bodybuilding supplements. A second TakeOver: In Your House was scheduled for June 13, 2021, thus making In Your House an annual subseries of TakeOver events. This second event aired on both the WWE Network and traditional pay-per-view, thus returning In Your House to pay-per-view. It also aired on Peacock after the American version of the WWE Network merged under Peacock in March 2021, thus being the first In Your House to air on Peacock.

In September 2021, NXT was rebranded as NXT 2.0, returning it to its original function as WWE's developmental brand, and the NXT TakeOver series was subsequently discontinued. The 2022 event was in turn held without the TakeOver branding, and it only aired on WWE's livestreaming platforms as NXT's events ceased airing on traditional pay-per-view that year. This would be the final In Your House as another event was not scheduled for 2023.

== Events ==
| # | Event | Date | City | Venue | Main event | Ref. |
|---|---|---|---|---|---|---|
| 1 | In Your House "Premiere" | May 14, 1995 | Syracuse, New York | Onondaga County War Memorial | Diesel (c) vs. Sycho Sid for the WWF Championship | |
| 2 | In Your House 2 "The Lumberjacks" | July 23, 1995 | Nashville, Tennessee | Nashville Municipal Auditorium | Diesel (c) vs. Sycho Sid for the WWF Championship in a Lumberjack match | |
| 3 | In Your House 3 "Triple Header" | September 24, 1995 | Saginaw, Michigan | Saginaw Civic Center | Two Dudes with Attitudes (Diesel (c-WWF) and Shawn Michaels (c-Intercontinental)) vs. Yokozuna and The British Bulldog (c-Tag Team) in a Winners Take All match for the WWF Championship, WWF Intercontinental Championship, and WWF Tag Team Championship | |
| 4 | In Your House 4 "Great White North" | October 22, 1995 | Winnipeg, Manitoba, Canada | Winnipeg Arena | Diesel (c) vs. The British Bulldog for the WWF Championship | |
| 5 | In Your House 5 "Seasons Beatings" | December 17, 1995 | Hershey, Pennsylvania | Hersheypark Arena | Bret Hart (c) vs. The British Bulldog for the WWF Championship | |
| 6 | In Your House 6 "Rage in the Cage" | February 18, 1996 | Louisville, Kentucky | Louisville Gardens | Bret Hart (c) vs. Diesel in a Steel Cage match for the WWF Championship | |
| 7 | In Your House 7: Good Friends, Better Enemies | April 28, 1996 | Omaha, Nebraska | Omaha Civic Auditorium | Shawn Michaels (c) vs. Diesel in a No Holds Barred match for the WWF Championship | |
| 8 | In Your House 8: Beware of Dog | May 26, 1996 | Florence, South Carolina | Florence Civic Center | Shawn Michaels (c) vs. The British Bulldog for the WWF Championship | |
| 8 | In Your House 8: Beware of Dog | May 28, 1996 | North Charleston, South Carolina | North Charleston Coliseum | Goldust (c) vs. The Undertaker in a Casket match for the WWF Intercontinental Championship | |
| 9 | In Your House 9: International Incident | July 21, 1996 | Vancouver, British Columbia, Canada | General Motors Place | Camp Cornette (Vader, Owen Hart, and The British Bulldog) vs. The People's Posse (Shawn Michaels, Sycho Sid, and Ahmed Johnson) | |
| 10 | In Your House 10: Mind Games | September 22, 1996 | Philadelphia, Pennsylvania | CoreStates Center | Shawn Michaels (c) vs. Mankind for the WWF Championship | |
| 11 | In Your House 11: Buried Alive | October 20, 1996 | Indianapolis, Indiana | Market Square Arena | The Undertaker vs. Mankind in a Buried Alive match | |
| 12 | In Your House 12: It's Time | December 15, 1996 | West Palm Beach, Florida | West Palm Beach Auditorium | Sycho Sid (c) vs. Bret Hart for the WWF Championship | |
| 13 | In Your House 13: Final Four | February 16, 1997 | Chattanooga, Tennessee | UTC Arena | Bret Hart vs. Stone Cold Steve Austin vs. The Undertaker vs. Vader in a Four Corners Elimination match for the vacant WWF Championship | |
| 14 | In Your House 14: Revenge of the 'Taker | April 20, 1997 | Rochester, New York | Rochester County War Memorial | Stone Cold Steve Austin vs. Bret Hart for a WWF Championship match | |
| 15 | In Your House 15: A Cold Day in Hell | May 11, 1997 | Richmond, Virginia | Richmond Coliseum | The Undertaker (c) vs. Stone Cold Steve Austin for the WWF Championship | |
| 16 | In Your House 16: Canadian Stampede | July 6, 1997 | Calgary, Alberta, Canada | Saddledome | The Hart Foundation (Bret Hart, Jim Neidhart, Owen Hart, The British Bulldog, and Brian Pillman) vs. Stone Cold Steve Austin, Ken Shamrock, Goldust, and The Legion of Doom (Hawk and Animal) | |
| 17 | Ground Zero: In Your House | September 7, 1997 | Louisville, Kentucky | Louisville Gardens | The Undertaker vs. Shawn Michaels | |
| 18 | Badd Blood: In Your House | October 5, 1997 | St. Louis, Missouri | Kiel Center | The Undertaker vs. Shawn Michaels in a Hell in a Cell match for a WWF Championship match at Survivor Series | |
| 19 | D-Generation X: In Your House | December 7, 1997 | Springfield, Massachusetts | Springfield Civic Center | Shawn Michaels (c) vs. Ken Shamrock for the WWF Championship | |
| 20 | No Way Out of Texas: In Your House | February 15, 1998 | Houston, Texas | Compaq Center | Stone Cold Steve Austin, Owen Hart, Cactus Jack, and Chainsaw Charlie vs. Triple H, Savio Vega, and The New Age Outlaws (Billy Gunn and Road Dogg) | |
| 21 | Unforgiven: In Your House | April 26, 1998 | Greensboro, North Carolina | Greensboro Coliseum Complex | Stone Cold Steve Austin (c) vs. Dude Love for the WWF Championship | |
| 22 | Over the Edge: In Your House | May 31, 1998 | Milwaukee, Wisconsin | Wisconsin Center Arena | Stone Cold Steve Austin (c) vs. Dude Love in a No Disqualification Falls Count Anywhere match for the WWF Championship with Vince McMahon as the special guest referee | |
| 23 | Fully Loaded: In Your House | July 26, 1998 | Fresno, California | Selland Arena | Kane and Mankind (c) vs. The Undertaker and Stone Cold Steve Austin for the WWF Tag Team Championship | |
| 24 | Breakdown: In Your House | September 27, 1998 | Hamilton, Ontario, Canada | Copps Coliseum | Stone Cold Steve Austin (c) vs. The Undertaker vs. Kane in a triple threat match for the WWF Championship | |
| 25 | Judgment Day: In Your House | October 18, 1998 | Rosemont, Illinois | Rosemont Horizon | The Undertaker vs. Kane for the vacant WWF Championship with Stone Cold Steve Austin as the special guest referee | |
| 26 | Rock Bottom: In Your House | December 13, 1998 | Vancouver, British Columbia, Canada | General Motors Place | Stone Cold Steve Austin vs. The Undertaker in a Buried Alive match for a spot in the 1999 Royal Rumble match | |
| 27 | St. Valentine's Day Massacre: In Your House | February 14, 1999 | Memphis, Tennessee | Pyramid Arena | Stone Cold Steve Austin vs. Vince McMahon in a Steel Cage match for a WWF Championship match at WrestleMania XV | |
| 28 | NXT TakeOver: In Your House (2020) | June 7, 2020 | Winter Park, Florida | Full Sail University | Charlotte Flair (c) vs. Io Shirai vs. Rhea Ripley in a triple threat match for the NXT Women's Championship | |
| 29 | NXT TakeOver: In Your House (2021) | June 13, 2021 | Orlando, Florida | Capitol Wrestling Center at WWE Performance Center | Karrion Kross (c) vs. Adam Cole vs. Kyle O'Reilly vs. Johnny Gargano vs. Pete Dunne in a fatal five-way match for the NXT Championship | |
| 30 | NXT In Your House (2022) | June 4, 2022 | Orlando, Florida | WWE Performance Center | Bron Breakker (c) vs. Joe Gacy for the NXT Championship | |
(c) – refers to the champion(s) heading into the match

== See also ==
- TNA One Night Only
- NXT TakeOver series
