= Survivor Series (1998) =

World Wrestling Federation pay-per-view event

- Promotional poster
- Promotion: World Wrestling Federation
- Date: November 15, 1998
- City: St. Louis, Missouri
- Venue: Kiel Center
- Attendance: 21,179
- Buy rate: 400,780
- Tagline: Deadly Game

Pay-per-view chronology
← Previous; Judgment Day: In Your House	Next → Capital Carnage

Survivor Series chronology
← Previous; 1997	Next → 1999

The 1998 Survivor Series, also promoted as Survivor Series: Deadly Game, was a professional wrestling pay-per-view (PPV) event produced by the World Wrestling Federation (WWF, renamed WWE in 2002). It was the 12th annual Survivor Series event and took place on November 15, 1998, at the Kiel Center in St. Louis, Missouri. The event's promotional title was a reference to it hosting a 14-man single-elimination tournament for the vacant WWF Championship, called the Deadly Game. As a result, it was the first Survivor Series event not to feature the eponymous Survivor Series match.

In the main event, which was the tournament final, The Rock defeated Mankind with assistance from Mr. McMahon, who in similar fashion to the "Montreal Screwjob" from last year's Survivor Series, ordered the referee to end the match as The Rock held Mankind in a Sharpshooter, even though he had not submitted, to claim the title. Two other championships were also defended on the undercard, with Sable defeating Jacqueline in the first defense of the WWF Women's Championship since its reactivation, and The New Age Outlaws (Billy Gunn and Road Dogg) retaining the WWF Tag Team Championship in a triple threat tag team match against The Headbangers (Mosh and Thrasher) and the team of D'Lo Brown and Mark Henry.

== Production ==
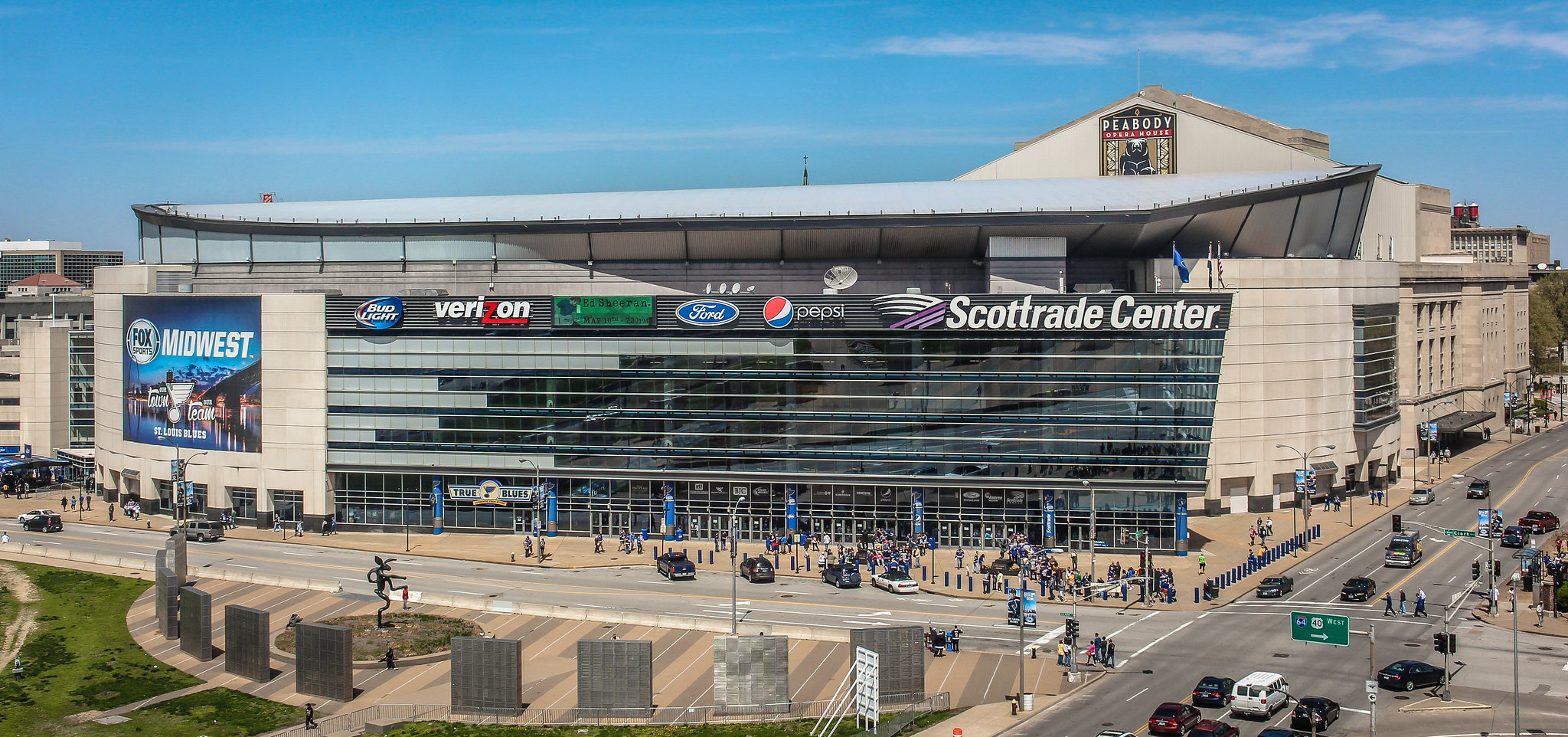
The 12th annual Survivor Series event was held in St. Louis, Missouri at the Kiel Center (pictured in 2015 after it had since been renamed as Scottrade Center).

=== Background ===
Survivor Series is an annual professional wrestling pay-per-view (PPV) event, produced every November by the World Wrestling Federation (WWF, renamed WWE in 2002) since 1987, generally held around Thanksgiving in the United States. In what has become the second longest-running PPV event in history (behind WWE's WrestleMania), it is one of the promotion's original four PPVs, along with WrestleMania, SummerSlam, and Royal Rumble, referred to as the "Big Four", and was considered one of the "Big Five" PPVs with the addition of King of the Ring in 1993. The 12th Survivor Series event was scheduled to be held on November 15, 1998, at the Kiel Center in St. Louis, Missouri.

The event is traditionally characterized by having Survivor Series matches, which are tag team elimination matches that typically pits teams of four or five wrestlers against each other. The 1998 event, however, was the first Survivor Series event to not feature the titular match. It instead featured a 14-man single-elimination tournament for the vacant WWF Championship called the "Deadly Game". The event was subtitled "Deadly Game" for the aforementioned tournament.

=== Storylines ===
Survivor Series consisted of professional wrestling matches involving wrestlers from pre-existing feuds and storylines that played out on Raw is War — WWF's primary television program.

==== Main storyline ====
The major storyline involved the WWF Championship, which had been vacant since September after the events of Breakdown: In Your House where the Undertaker and Kane both pinned then champion Steve Austin at the same time in a match for the WWF championship.

In March, "Stone Cold" Steve Austin had won the WWF Championship at WrestleMania XIV, and in the months that followed company owner Vince McMahon had been scheming to get the title off of him as he did not feel Austin was suitable for the company's image.

Austin would eventually lose the title in a First Blood match against Kane at King of the Ring in June after Kane's (Kayfabe) half-brother, The Undertaker, struck Austin with a chair to save Kane from hurting himself despite the two being in a feud dating from Kane's debut in 1997. Kane's reign did not last long, however, as Austin coerced him into a rematch for the title the next night on the Raw episode following the pay-per-view and defeated him to regain the WWF Championship.

Austin and Undertaker then began a brief but strained alliance shortly thereafter that resulted in a brief 15 day WWF Tag Team Championship reign before a title match was signed between the two for SummerSlam in August. However, shortly before the event it was revealed that Undertaker and Kane had been in cahoots all along. After Austin retained the title at SummerSlam, it was revealed that the brothers had also made a deal with McMahon to try and ensure Austin lost the championship. This led to the match at Breakdown, which was signed as a triple threat match but became a de facto handicap match; McMahon added a stipulation that Undertaker and Kane could not score a fall against each other and could only do so against Austin. Austin would go on to lose the match and the championship, with Undertaker and Kane both pinning him simultaneously.

After Breakdown, McMahon held a ceremony to award the WWF Championship but before he could name Undertaker or Kane the champion, Austin crashed the ceremony to attack McMahon. McMahon, furious at the brothers for failing to protect him from Austin, decided to leave the title vacant and booked a special match at Judgment Day: In Your House. Not only would Undertaker and Kane wrestle for the vacant title against their will, McMahon ordered Austin to serve as the referee so he would have the “indignity” of being forced to count a fall and crown a new champion. Austin told McMahon he would not raise anyone's hand but his in victory, leading McMahon to threaten him with termination if he did not perform his duties properly. Austin called McMahon's bluff, attacking both Undertaker and Kane and counting them out, and then declared himself the winner and champion. McMahon then made good on his threat to fire Austin.

Since the Undertaker-Kane match had not resolved anything and the title was still vacant, it was decided that a tournament would be set up to decide the champion at Survivor Series. Fourteen wrestlers were signed to take part in what was referred to as the “Deadly Game”, with the last man standing winning the WWF Championship at the end of the night.

==== Other storylines ====
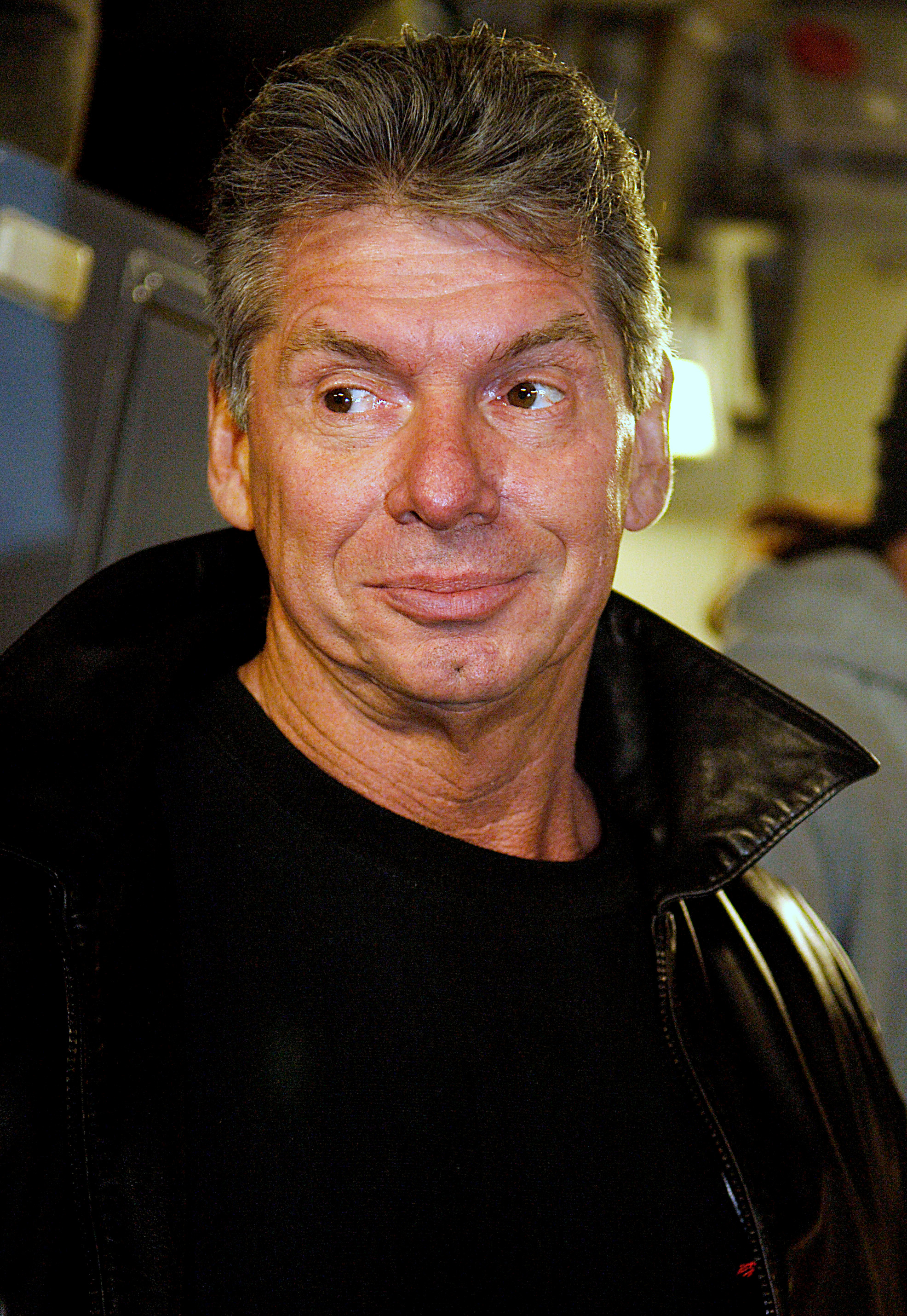
Mr. McMahon's disdain for "Stone Cold" Steve Austin led to the tournament.

Despite being fired, Austin was at Raw Is War the night after Judgment Day and held McMahon hostage at gunpoint, though when Austin went to fire his gun it turned out to be a joke gun, with a sign saying BANG! 3:16 on it; Austin left the ring when McMahon soiled himself, having given him a piece of paper. Austin revealed the following week that the paper was a five-year contract that guaranteed him a championship match and most shockingly of all, the contract had been signed by Mr. McMahon's son Shane, who had his owner rights suspended by his father and was demoted to a referee.

As well as Austin, McMahon seemed to have a new target of hatred. On the November 2 edition of Raw Is War, McMahon declared to the self-styled People's Champion that because he had a problem with the people, he had a problem with The Rock. He then ordered Rock into an Intercontinental match with Ken Shamrock, with Rock's tournament spot on the line. Shamrock hit him with a chair and thus he won, but only by disqualification and thus lost his tournament spot. Afterwards McMahon had The Rock arrested, much like he had done months before with Austin. The following week McMahon threatened him with expulsion from the company if he could not win a match against former Nation of Domination stable mate Mark Henry. Despite the odds being stacked in his favor with McMahon's entourage at ring side distracting the referee, Shane McMahon ran down after Rock had performed the Rock Bottom, a lifting side slam, on Henry and counted the pinfall to secure Rock's employment and, presumably, earning back his spot in the tournament although this was never specifically mentioned other than McMahon mentioning it on Heat.

While many wrestlers became the target of Vince McMahon's ire, one wrestler returned to being his favorite. With his son ostensibly turning on him, Mankind tried to cheer McMahon up and was treated as a surrogate child. McMahon awarded him a new belt, the WWF Hardcore Championship, as well as giving him a makeover, including a pedicure, haircut and tailored suit, gearing him up to win the tournament. As well as being a Hardcore Champion, Mankind had formed an ad hoc tag team with Al Snow; the humorous duo mocked each other's mascots which they talked to, Mr. Socko and Head. In a tag team match Mr. Socko went missing and it later transpired that Mr. McMahon had wrapped it round Al Snow's Head in order to provoke his wrath. Snow himself had also had several run-ins with Jeff Jarrett, after Jarrett had opened his guitar case only to find Head inside, instead of his trademark weapon.

Family problems were abound elsewhere with the return of Paul Bearer at Judgment Day. Bearer had been at Kane's side ever since his debut the previous October at Badd Blood, but when Kane and Undertaker allied to take down Austin, Kane turned his back on Bearer and allowed Undertaker to beat him. When Bearer returned he seemed to be on Kane's side, but in fact he gave a chair to Undertaker to strike Kane with, revealing on Raw that he had returned to being Undertaker's mentor.

For weeks, vignettes had announced the arrival of Steven Regal under the gimmick of "a man's man". Regal made his debut by attacking the European Champion X-Pac from behind on Raw is War. Also, a masked man in a SWAT style uniform appeared alongside Mr. McMahon to defend him against Austin's attacks. The enforcer turned out to be the returning Big Boss Man, who after a stint in World Championship Wrestling (WCW) had taken on the role of personal bodyguard for McMahon.

The two other feuds going into the event were both championship feuds. Marc Mero grew jealous of his valet Sable and the attention she gained, eventually having her fired by defeating her in a match. When she returned as a wrestler in her own right, Mero employed a new valet Jacqueline and the two naturally squared off. Firstly they had a bikini contest, which Sable won by popularity, but was disqualified as her bikini consisted of handprints. The two then had an arm wrestling contest, which ended with Jacqueline cracking the bikini contest trophy over the head of Sable. When Sable revealed the Women's Championship had been reactivated, the two met for a match on Raw, in which Jacqueline won due to Mero holding Sable's legs down. After Sable was further humiliated when Jacqueline cut a piece of her hair and wrapped it into her own hair, Sable demanded a championship match.

The Headbangers had met the New Age Outlaws the previous month and after dominating most of the match, won via disqualification when Road Dogg broke a boombox over Mosh's head. Despite titles not changing hands by disqualification, the Headbangers began to declare themselves champions, coming to the ring with toy replica belts and parodying New Age Outlaws pre-match speeches. With the dissolution of The Nation, D'Lo Brown and Mark Henry stayed together as a tag team and with Brown's feud with X-Pac over the European title, by messing with one D-Generate, he picked an unwitting fight with the Outlaws too.

== Event ==
Other on-screen personnel
English commentators	Jim Ross
English commentators	Jerry Lawler
Spanish commentators	Carlos Cabrera
Spanish commentators	Hugo Savinovich
Interviewers	Michael Cole
Interviewers	Dok Hendrix
Interviewers	Kevin Kelly
Ring announcers	Tony Chimel (Sunday Night Heat)
Ring announcers	Howard Finkel (PPV)
Referees	Shane McMahon
Referees	Mike Chioda
Referees	Jack Doan
Referees	Earl Hebner
Referees	Jim Korderas
Referees	Tim White

=== First round ===
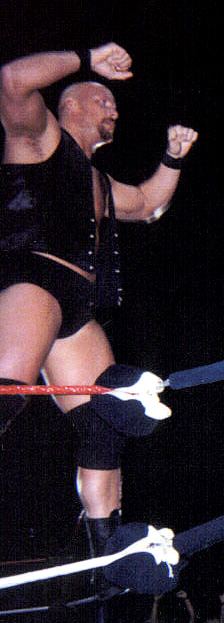
"Stone Cold" Steve Austin lost in the semi-finals due to a Corporate conspiracy

The opening match was part of the tournament and saw Mr. McMahon introduce Mankind and his mystery opponent. After a grandiose introduction, promising a WWF veteran with a record setting win–loss record, jobber Duane Gill came out. The match barely lasted one minute as Mankind knocked Gill to the mat and rolled him up for a pin.

Al Snow's match against Jeff Jarrett began with Snow following Jarret's valet, Debra McMichael. Snow soon entered the ring and took the first advantage, using the ropes to aid him with a neckbreaker but mistiming a flying leg drop. After a succession of reversed pinfalls attempts by both parties and a DDT by Snow, both men were lying on the mat. Debra walked onto the apron with Snow's mannequin head to distract the referee and allow Jarrett to pick it up. Snow himself grabbed Jarrett's guitar and swung for Jarrett, but missed and received Head. Jarrett went to attack him again in the corner but a kick from Snow allowed him to grab the Head and smack into it Jarrett's face, allowing a victory via pinfall when the referee finally looked back. Snow faced Mankind in the quarter-finals.

Big Boss Man met Steve Austin on the walkway for their fight, with Austin throwing Boss Man into the steel steps before the match was officially under way. Inside the ring Boss Man used his punches to subdue Austin before choking him in the middle of the ring. Crowd support inspired Austin to fight back with a clothesline, shoulder barging his opponent into the turnbuckle before stomping a mudhole. After being Irish whipped against the ropes, Boss Man escaped the ring and when Austin caught up with him, he was met with a night stick from the Boss Man. The referee awarded the match via disqualification to Austin but that did not stop the onslaught from Boss Man's nightstick, much to the delight of Mr. McMahon.

The fourth tournament match, between European Champion X-Pac and Steven Regal, saw X-Pac's fast-paced style take advantage over Regal until a mistimed bronco buster in the corner left X-Pac in pain. Regal pulled him out to fit a seated abdominal stretch on him. Regal's mat-based technical style kept X-Pac slowed down and without much of his arsenal. Regal ventured to the top rope with his opponent, utilizing a double-underhook suplex from the top turnbuckle to put pressure on X-Pac's fragile neck. X-Pac regained the offense but when he went for a top rope maneuver, Regal shook the ropes, causing him to fall to the outside. Regal pursued him and both men were counted out. On McMahon's orders, Commissioner Slaughter attempted to restart the match but as an injured and confused X-Pac was already halfway up the ramp and Regal pursued him backstage, the match was not restarted, giving Steve Austin a bye through to the semi-finals.

The next match, between Ken Shamrock and Goldust, began as a high-speed encounter with both wrestlers making many running attacks, until Shamrock had Goldust on the floor at which point he began to use a chin lock to slow him down. Goldust regained some momentum after standing up and, although Shamrock was able to reverse it initially Goldust soon had some advantage in the match. Things changed though when Goldust set his opponent up for the illegal move, Shattered Dreams. As Goldust made the run up, the referee jumped in the way to prevent the low blow which gave Shamrock the time to jump up to the top rope, jumping onto Goldust for a hurricarana, following it up immediately with an ankle lock that made Goldust submit.

In the last first round match, the Rock was to square off against a returning Triple H. However, Triple H did not appear (presumably due to his knee injury); instead Pat Patterson and Gerald Brisco came out, and presented a "last minute replacement" in the form of Big Boss Man, who ran to the ring only to be rolled into a pin for the shortest match in WWF history, three seconds.

=== Quarter-finals ===
The first of the quarter-final matches, which saw the time limit increased to fifteen minutes, was between two wrestlers who received byes through the first round, the warring brothers Undertaker and Kane. Both threw each other around the ring before the match was taken briefly outside, Undertaker thrown into the crowd barrier and Kane stomped into the steel steps. Although Kane would retake the advantage in the ring, a jumping elbow drop met with the mat when Undertaker sat up. Undertaker used the opportunity to take out Kane's knee, using a number of attacks and holds on it. Undertaker pushed the rules to the limit by choking Kane in the corner and as the referee reprimanded him, Kane was able to recuperate to fight back. After a series of punches and a flying lariat the two were even again, this was symbolised when Undertaker grabbed Kane's throat for a chokeslam from a running attack. Kane did the same and eventually was able to deliver the chokeslam. Before he could pin his brother though, Paul Bearer jumped on the apron to distract Kane and in the interim period Undertaker stood up to deliver a tombstone piledriver and pin his brother, with Bearer holding Kane's leg down.

Mankind met Al Snow next, with Snow throwing Mankind around the ring and barging him to the floor before dropkicking him to the outside. Mankind tried to balance things by grabbing a steel chair but Snow took it off him and hit him twice (without disqualification), before mistiming an attack to the ring post allowing for Mankind to take charge. Having been beaten in the ring, Snow crawled to Head to use as a weapon but swung and missed, allowing Mankind to deliver a back drop. As he did, Head came away in his hand and he realized Mr. Socko was tied round Head's head. The rage saw him beat the mannequin, stamping on it before turning his attention back to Al Snow to land a double-armed DDT and then the mandible claw to win the match and setting up a match for Steve Austin in the next round.

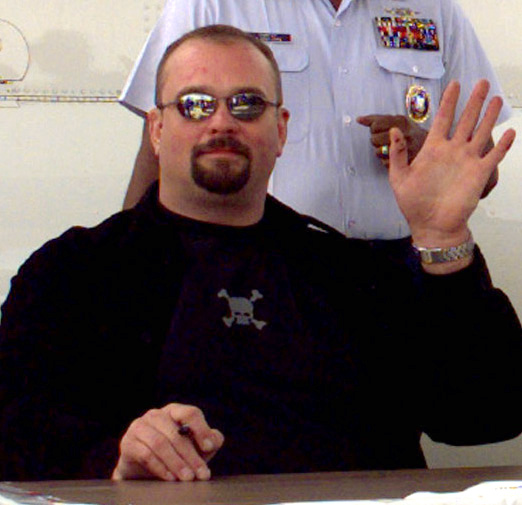
The Big Boss Man was entered into the tournament twice and interfered in The Rock's matches

The final second round match pitted the long-feuding Shamrock and The Rock against each other. Rock began his attack instantly, punching and clotheslining Shamrock before the latter replied with a suplex. Rock was not down for long, coming out of a kneeling position with another clothesline before chasing Shamrock out of the ring and spitting water into his face but receiving steel steps in the shoulder for it. Big Boss Man came to the ring as Shamrock moved from a chin lock into his ankle lock. Rock held on and slowly crawled for the ring break. After breaking away both men collided with a double clothesline allowing both men to recover and, after a failed pin attempt, stand up and fight again. Rock dynamically swung around Shamrock's body to secure a DDT attempt and as Boss Man distracted the referee, punched Shamrock in the crotch. Despite this, and a People's Elbow, Shamrock still kicked out and managed to reverse a Rock Bottom attempt into a belly-to-belly suplex. Boss Man tried to interfere again, slyly throwing a night stick to Shamrock as the referee was distracted. Rock intercepted the night stick though, allowing him to strike down Shamrock and make a pinfall.

=== Women's Championship ===
Halfway through the evening, women's Champion Jacqueline defended her title against Sable. The match seemed to be over almost instantly as, after a flurry of strikes Sable used the TKO on Jacqueline. Marc Mero, though, pulled Sable away from the pinfall for which he received a kick to the groin, followed by a Sable Bomb on the outside of the ring allowing Jacqueline to recover and attack her from behind, rolling her back into the ring and taunting Sable with the hair Jacqueline had cut a few weeks before. Sable was then taken to the corner and kicked before being set up for a powerbomb. Sable tossed the champion over her back but Jacqueline crawled her over to the corner to set up a tornado DDT from the turnbuckle. Sable reversed again, throwing Jacqueline to the ground, picking her up to deliver a Sable Bomb and winning the Women's Championship.

=== Semi-finals ===
The first semi-final between Corporate-sponsored Mankind and fan-favorite Steve Austin started more with a brawl than wrestling; Mankind threw off his tuxedo jacket as the two exchanged rough punches until Austin landed in the corner at which point Mankind began to bite him before landing a knee drop into his face and using his shoe as a weapon. After receiving a Lou Thesz press and a stunner attempt, Mankind ran away but McMahon's cronies, who were at ringside caught up with him and stopped him. Austin caught him from behind with a clothesline and the two fought in and out of the ring with referee Mike Chioda reluctant to count out or disqualify either wrestler. As the two met back in the ring, they grappled so much that Mankind's shirt came out of his trousers, resembling more and more his old appearance by the time a double clothesline floored both wrestlers. Mankind was thrown a chair from the outside but as he ran it into "Stone Cold", Austin put his foot up, kicking Mankind through the chair. Still, Mankind was unabated delivering a double-armed DDT onto the chair and when that would not keep Austin down, he tried a piledriver on the chair but Austin ran him forward then tossed him over his back so that he landed on the chair. He picked him up and executed a Stone Cold Stunner on the chair too and as he made what seemed to be the inevitable victory, McMahon jumped out of his wheelchair and pulled the referee out of the ring, punching him to the ground and kicking him. With Austin looking on in shock, Mankind applied the mandible claw but as his trousers fell down he had trouble maintaining balance. Austin threw him into the ropes and caught another stunner, covering him despite there being no referee; suddenly Shane McMahon ran down the ramp and slid into the ring counting, but then stopping suddenly at two and as Austin looked up, Shane sat up on his knees and gave Austin the finger. Gerald Brisco and Slaughter climbed in the ring and hit Austin with a chair, then Shane counted the pinfall advancing Mankind into the final. McMahon's entourage sped off quickly, jumping into a limousine and being followed by Austin.

The second semi-final between The Rock and The Undertaker was fought initially around ringside, mostly a series of punches and headbutts until Rock was thrown back into the ring. The Rock was pummeled by a series of strikes and throat punches from Undertaker that eventually left him tied up in the ropes. From this position he was able to toss Undertaker out of the ring and followed him, fighting in the crowd eventually. Back in the ring there was still no discernible advantage, both exchanging punches and The Rock delivering a Samoan Drop. As the two lay motionless on the mat, Big Boss Man came back to ringside, apparently having not left with the rest of McMahon's entourage. He stopped Rock from finishing the People's Elbow by grabbing at his foot, allowing Undertaker to take Rock down, though Undertaker struck Boss Man from the apron. As Undertaker set up The Rock for a chokeslam, Kane climbed in the ring and Undertaker threw The Rock into Kane's hands, with Kane delivering a chokeslam to The Rock. This gave The Rock a win via disqualification and he advanced onto the final as Undertaker and Kane fought through the crowd.

=== Tag Team Championship ===
Next, the WWF Tag Team Championship was contested in a triple threat match between the champions, the New Age Outlaws ("Bad Ass" Billy Gunn and Road Dogg), and two challenging teams – D'Lo Brown and Mark Henry and The Headbangers. Gunn and Brown fought with Mosh trying to steal a pinfall. Gunn let Brown and Mosh fight while he tagged in Road Dogg, although this amounted to little as the New Age Outlaws threw both Headbangers out the ring and took a ten-punch to Brown and Henry. Both Headbangers returned to double team Road Dogg and the match was resumed proper with Mosh and Brown both attempting pins on Road Dogg and then teaming up on him, changing partners to continue the onslaught until Brown threw out Road Dogg and turned on Mosh, managing a frankensteiner on him but soon falling fowl to a Russian leg sweep. When Road Dogg returned he took the brunt of assault again and as he was down Brown's running powerbomb on Mosh was reversed into a sunset flip like pin. Both changed partners again, with the Headbangers double teaming Road Dogg but not helping Brown to double team them and instead delivering a low blow but without securing a pinfall. As their alliance failed, Road Dogg crawled to tag in the yet unused Billy Gunn, whose hot tag saw him take down everybody until Brown caught him from a running momentum to land a Lo Down which strangely referee Tim White delayed his pin count. After Billy Gunn kicked out, he jumped on a running Mosh to land the Fameasser and then a piledriver to retain the championship with a pin victory.

=== Final ===
The tournament final began slowly, with The Rock and Mankind trying to gauge each other. Both wrestlers secured takedowns or the other before Mankind slowed down the match with a sleeper hold on The Rock. At this point, Mr. McMahon and Shane, who had faked their escape from the arena to rid themselves of Austin, walked down to ringside. The Rock fought his way back to his feet in the sleeper hold and backdropped Mankind, before tossing him outside the ring. He then reversed a suplex with one of his own before dropping Mankind's crotch onto the crowd barrier. Both wrestlers returned to the ring briefly, only for Mankind to Cactus Clothesline them back out to the announce tables where Mankind grabbed a steel chair and floored The Rock, with referee Earl Hebner not disqualifying him. Mankind then picked up the steel steps and went to drop them on The Rock but was met with a chair shot through the steps, causing them to drop the steps on himself and The Rock unleashed a myriad of chair shots on the steps into Mankind. The match turned dirtier when it returned to the ring, with Mankind desperately low blowing The Rock and then following it up by biting The Rock's face, again with the referee not ending it. As The Rock crawled outside of the ring to escape the biting, Mankind followed him and pushed him onto the announce table, continuing to bite him and landing a leg drop. He could not make The Rock lay down for three in the ring though and after another sleeper hold, The Rock began to fight back with a flurry of punches and reversing Mankind's back toss into a DDT. With The Rock thrown out the ring, Mankind tried to elbow drop him from the second rope but ended up going through the Spanish announce table on his own. After using bits of the table to hit Mankind, Mankind was thrown back into the ring and kicked out of the People's Elbow and then hit a double-armed DDT from a running The Rock. Mankind then took out Mr. Socko—a disgusting gym sock—and stuffed it in The Rock's mouth with the mandible claw. The Rock nearly passed out due to the sock’s foul smell, but The Rock managed to withstand the sock and jump into the Rock Bottom. The Rock then, much to the vocal surprise of the crowd, grabbed Mankind's legs and fixed him in the sharpshooter, using the top rope for leverage. In a reference to the infamous Montreal Screwjob which took place at the previous year's Survivor Series event, without anyone having submitted, Mr McMahon ordered the referee to ring the bell and award the victory and the WWF Championship to The Rock.

After the match, Mr. McMahon and Shane entered the ring with Mr. McMahon telling the audience how he had successfully screwed Steve Austin, Mankind and the people. When Mankind asked for an explanation, The Rock delivered another Rock Bottom but as the three of them celebrated, Austin ran into the ring and was met with a beating from The Rock that he eventually fought back from, tossing The Rock out of the ring before grabbing the Championship belt and throwing it on The Rock. He then gave a stunner to the just-recovered Mankind as the pay-per-view ended.

== Reception ==
The event has received mixed reviews from critics, with the overall story of the show generally getting a positive reaction and the wrestling getting a negative reaction.

In 2018, Kevin Pantoja of 411Mania gave the event a rating of 3.5 [Bad], stating, "This show is remembered for the tournament, but it’s not good. There are only two matches that I’d consider enjoyable (Mankind/Austin and Mankind/Rock). Everything else is either flat out bad, like the Tag Team or Women’s Title matches, or was just used to further advance angles. It was kind of exactly what you’d expect from the Attitude Era. The in-ring stuff mostly lacked, but the storylines were advanced and there was a swerve."

In 2021, Michael Fitzgerald of Scott's Blog of Doom described the event as a "Recommended Show (Depending on what kind of wrestling you like)," stating, "I can fully understand how this show would divide people. If you watch wrestling primarily for the actual wrestling and enjoy good matches, then you’ll probably hate this show because good wrestling is at a premium due to them essentially sacrificing all but 2-3 matches on the card in the name of advancing the story of the show itself. If you watch wrestling primarily for the soap opera and storyline elements then you will probably love this show because they absolutely nail that aspect here, with a great story being told throughout the night that pays off in the end. The twists and turns all make sense in the grand scheme of things and it’s a testament to how hot the WWF was at the time that they could tease the fans with a Rock babyface run and snatch it away, only to then do even better business as a result."

In 2022, John Canton of TJR Wrestling gave the event a rating of 8/10, stating, "This is an example of great booking making a show awesome rather than amazing matches from top to bottom. The huge swerve at the end of the night made you want to see what would happen next. That’s what we want. I still liked the 1996 show more because there were better matches, but top to bottom this was an excellent pay-per-view." Vince Russo, the then head writer of the WWF, has gone on record by calling the event the greatest thing he had ever written in his entire professional wrestling career.

== Aftermath ==
The immediate effects of the event, alongside The Rock turning heel by aligning himself with McMahon, was the creation of The Corporation. The following evening on Raw, McMahon declared The Rock to be the Corporate Champion and set about persuading other wrestlers down the roster to join with the promise of money and power. The first to join was Ken Shamrock, who demanded a match with the Big Boss Man for interfering in his match, but towards the end of the match both McMahons came to the ring and convinced him to join. They also tried to convince the New Age Outlaws to join, but after feigning an allegiance they revealed to be true to D-Generation X and had to defend their Tag Team Titles at Rock Bottom: In Your House and again the following night, which they lost after much interference. McMahon also introduced a new commissioner, Shawn Michaels, who also showed corporate bias before returning to his DX stable. In the following year The Corporation would become a large stable and would have a rivalry with The Undertaker's Ministry of Darkness.

On a more individual basis, Mankind's outrage at being screwed by Mr. McMahon led him to a title match at the subsequent pay-per-view, Rock Bottom. Despite winning the match, McMahon managed to manipulate the rules to make sure The Rock retained his title again but the first Raw of the new year saw Mankind win the title, leading to an "I Quit" match at the Royal Rumble, a match that became infamous for its brutality, as well as becoming one of the focuses of the Beyond the Mat documentary. This led to an empty arena match, a Last Man Standing match and finally a ladder match, with the title frequently changing hands until ultimately The Rock would go on to WrestleMania XV as champion, with Mankind finding his way into the main event as a special guest referee.

Austin and Mr. McMahon's feud continued to escalate after he was cheated in the semi-finals. The following night on Raw he reminded McMahon and The Rock that when he was rehired by Shane, he was guaranteed a title match. The match was marred with interference though both from Corporate members, Mankind trying to find revenge on The Rock, and The Undertaker, who took a shovel to Austin. McMahon tried to use Undertaker as another blockade for Austin, setting him in a Buried Alive Match to prevent him entering the Royal Rumble. Austin won the Buried Alive Match and was placed in the Royal Rumble entering first opposite McMahon at number two, who went on to win the Rumble, Austin reclaimed his WrestleMania place the following month and went on to win the title.

X-Pac's neck injury was not mentioned on screen and Steven Regal left the company soon after for WCW, without making another appearance until 2000 (as William Regal). Marc Mero would also disappear from programming, firstly to support his wife, Sable, in her career before leaving the company altogether. Firstly he split with Jacqueline, blaming her for his losing streak and she went on to form Pretty Mean Sisters; then in a moment of cockiness he announced that he was so insulted by being forced to face Duane Gill that he would quit if he lost. Thanks to interference from the debuting Blue Meanie, Duane Gill (who had become Light Heavyweight Champion) won the match and Mero quit, making one last appearance at UK's Capital Carnage. Sable would disappear until the new year, when she became an active defender of the Women's Championship; fighting the likes of Luna Vachon and newcomer Tori and forming an alliance with Nicole Bass.

== Results ==
No.	Results	Stipulations	Times
1^{D}	Too Much (Scott Taylor and Brian Christopher) defeated The Hardy Boyz (Matt and Jeff)	Tag team match	—
2^{H}	The J.O.B. Squad (Bob Holly and Scorpio) (with Al Snow) defeated The Legion of Doom (Animal and Droz)	Tag team match	2:17
3^{H}	Val Venis defeated Tiger Ali Singh (with Babu)	Singles match	2:36
4^{H}	Gangrel (with Edge and Christian) defeated Steve Blackman	Singles match	3:21
5	Mankind defeated Duane Gill	Tournament first round match	0:30
6	Al Snow defeated Jeff Jarrett (with Debra)	Tournament first round match	3:31
7	"Stone Cold" Steve Austin defeated Big Boss Man by disqualification	Tournament first round match	3:20
8	Steven Regal vs. X-Pac ended in a double countout	Tournament first round match	8:10
9	Ken Shamrock defeated Goldust by submission	Tournament first round match	5:56
10	The Rock defeated Big Boss Man	Tournament first round match	0:03
11	The Undertaker (with Paul Bearer) defeated Kane	Tournament quarter-final match	7:16
12	Mankind defeated Al Snow by submission	Tournament quarter-final match	3:55
13	The Rock defeated Ken Shamrock	Tournament quarter-final match	8:20
14	Sable defeated Jacqueline (c) (with Marc Mero)	Singles match for the WWF Women's Championship	3:14
15	Mankind defeated "Stone Cold" Steve Austin	Tournament semi-final match	10:27
16	The Rock defeated The Undertaker (with Paul Bearer) by disqualification	Tournament semi-final match	8:24
17	The New Age Outlaws (Billy Gunn and Road Dogg) (c) defeated The Headbangers (Mosh and Thrasher) and D'Lo Brown and Mark Henry	Triple threat match for the WWF Tag Team Championship	10:10
18	The Rock defeated Mankind by submission	Tournament final for the vacant WWF Championship	17:17
(c) / – the champion(s) heading into the match; D / – this was a dark match; H / – the match was broadcast prior to the pay-per-view on Sunday Night Heat

=== WWF Championship Tournament bracket ===
1st Round; Survivor Series; November 15, 1998
Goldust	5:56
Ken Shamrock	Submission
Big Boss Man (Note: Triple H was originally set to face The Rock in the first round, but his injury resulted into him being replaced by the Big Boss Man.)	0:03
The Rock	Pinfall
"Stone Cold" Steve Austin	Disqualification
Big Boss Man	3:20
Steven Regal	Countout (8:10)
X-Pac	Countout (8:10)
Jeff Jarrett	3:31
Al Snow	Pinfall
Duane Gill (Note: Duane Gill was Mankind's "mystery opponent".)	0:30
Mankind	Pinfall

Quarterfinals; Survivor Series; November 15, 1998
The Undertaker	Pinfall
Kane	7:16
Ken Shamrock	8:20
The Rock	Pinfall
"Stone Cold" Steve Austin	Bye
N/A	—
Al Snow	3:55
Mankind	Submission

Semifinals; Survivor Series; November 15, 1998
The Undertaker	8:20
The Rock	Disqualification
"Stone Cold" Steve Austin	10:27
Mankind	Pinfall

Final; Survivor Series; November 15, 1998
The Rock	Submission
Mankind	17:10
