= Judgment Day: In Your House =

1998 World Wrestling Federation pay-per-view event

- Promotional poster featuring The Undertaker
- Promotion: World Wrestling Federation
- Date: October 18, 1998
- City: Rosemont, Illinois
- Venue: Rosemont Horizon
- Attendance: 18,153
- Buy rate: 305,000

Pay-per-view chronology
← Previous; Breakdown: In Your House	Next → Survivor Series

In Your House chronology
← Previous; Breakdown	Next → Rock Bottom

Judgment Day chronology
← Previous; First	Next → 2000

Judgment Day: In Your House was a 1998 professional wrestling pay-per-view (PPV) event produced by the World Wrestling Federation (WWF, renamed WWE in 2002). It was the 25th In Your House and the inaugural Judgment Day. The event took place on October 18, 1998, at the Rosemont Horizon in the Chicago suburb of Rosemont, Illinois.

Nine professional wrestling matches were scheduled on the event's card. The main event saw The Undertaker and Kane fighting each other, despite their alliance at the time, for the WWF Championship which had been vacated after company owner Vince McMahon stripped former champion "Stone Cold" Steve Austin to further the storyline. Austin was made the special guest referee for the match, a role he was not keen to accept. The card included four other championship matches. All WWF championships except the WWF Women's Championship, which had been reinstated only a month before, were contested at the event.

This was one of the In Your House events which later became the title of an annual PPV, replacing the method at the time of making new names for all events aside from the "Big Five" (Royal Rumble, WrestleMania, King of the Ring, SummerSlam, and Survivor Series). Judgment Day returned in May 2000, becoming the promotion's annual May PPV until its final event in 2009.

== Production ==
=== Background ===
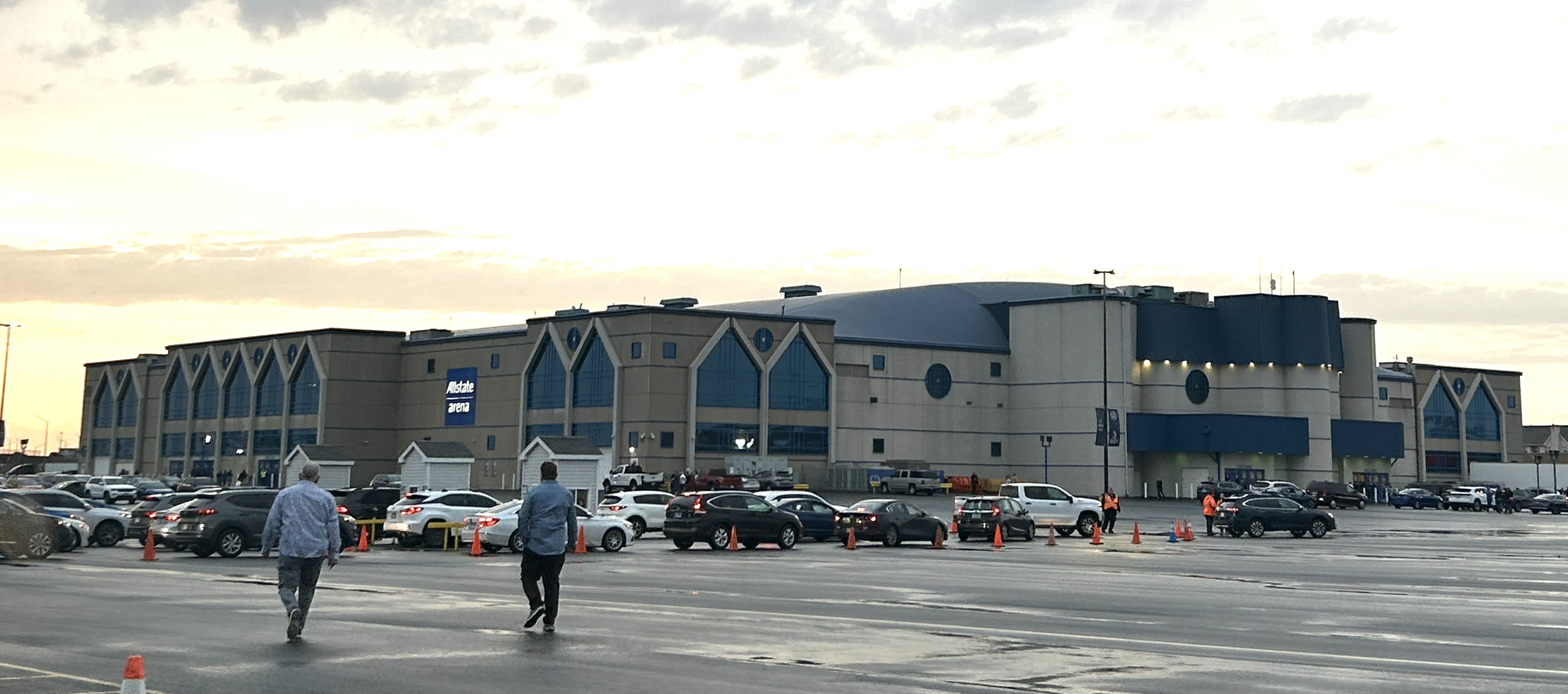
The 25th In Your House was held in the Chicago suburb of Rosemont, Illinois at the Rosemont Horizon (pictured as Allstate Arena, renamed in 1999).

In Your House was a series of monthly professional wrestling pay-per-view (PPV) events first produced by the World Wrestling Federation (WWF, renamed WWE in 2002) in May 1995. They aired when the promotion was not holding one of its then-five major PPVs (WrestleMania, King of the Ring, SummerSlam, Survivor Series, and Royal Rumble) and were sold at a lower cost. The 25th In Your House, titled Judgment Day: In Your House, was scheduled for October 18, 1998, at the Rosemont Horizon in the Chicago suburb of Rosemont, Illinois.

=== Storylines ===
The major storyline entering Judgment Day involved the WWF Championship and WWF owner Vince McMahon’s rivalry with "Stone Cold" Steve Austin, into which The Undertaker and Kane were drawn.

Shortly before SummerSlam, it had been revealed that Undertaker had formed an alliance with his brother Kane. After Austin successfully defended the WWF Championship against Undertaker, the alliance between the brothers was revealed to be of a more conniving nature than had been previously thought: McMahon had struck a deal with them in order to try and remove the title from Austin, which he had been trying to do from the moment Austin had first won the championship at WrestleMania XIV earlier in 1998.

Everything came to a climax at Breakdown: In Your House, which was held in September in Hamilton, Ontario. McMahon signed a triple threat match between Austin, Undertaker, and Kane for the WWF Championship. However, he added a stipulation where Undertaker could not pin Kane or make him submit, while Kane could not do the same to Undertaker. This turned the contest into a de facto handicap match, since either man could only score the fall over the champion to win the match. Austin was pinned simultaneously by Undertaker and Kane, thus losing the match. He also lost the championship, which McMahon retrieved from the ringside area and walked out of the building with while giving Austin the finger. However, since both Undertaker and Kane had scored the fall, the status of the title was unclear.

The following evening on Raw is War from Detroit, McMahon held a ceremony to crown the new champion and called both Undertaker and Kane to the ring. While McMahon was speaking, Austin commandeered a Zamboni backstage and drove it out to the ringside area, then dove from atop it into the ring and began assaulting McMahon. Austin was eventually separated from McMahon and arrested by the security detail in the ring, then taken away.

Once Austin was removed, McMahon resumed the ceremony. However, he announced that the deal he had brokered for Undertaker and Kane to receive a title shot was contingent on them protecting him from Austin. Since they had failed to do so, he said he was not going to award the WWF Championship to either one of them. Instead, the championship was to be considered vacant and Undertaker and Kane, “whether they liked it or not”, would face off for it at Judgment Day. McMahon then went further and inserted Austin into the contest as the special guest referee, saying that he wanted to see Austin “suffer the indignity” of having to count the fall and award the WWF Championship to one of the two men who caused him to lose it.

McMahon then wished the brothers luck, claiming they were going to need it. He then claimed that dealing with the two of them was like “dealing with the handicapped”, calling Kane physically handicapped and Undertaker mentally handicapped; Undertaker responded by telling McMahon that he and Kane would make him handicapped if he crossed them again. McMahon then made an obscene gesture toward the two, which Undertaker caught him doing. Undertaker then took McMahon down and began assaulting him, with Kane joining in by stomping him. Undertaker then went to work on McMahon’s leg, attacking it with several elbow drops and locking in a submission hold while Kane kept McMahon’s associates Pat Patterson and Gerald Brisco from stepping in to stop them. Finally, the attack moved outside the ring where Undertaker used the steel ring steps to crush the injured leg.

Austin, meanwhile, got further revenge on the injured McMahon on the following week’s Raw by invading his hospital room and attacking him with a bedpan and a defibrillator before finally sticking an enema tube in his rear end. On October 12 Raw, Austin poured cement on Vince McMahon's Chevrolet Corvette and delivered a promo where he said that he had no intention of cooperating with McMahon and declared the only hand he would raise in victory would be his. McMahon countered by warning Austin that if he did not perform his duties properly and award the championship to the winner of the match, he would fire Austin on the spot in front of the audience at the event.

==== Other stories ====
Dustin Runnels began preaching evangelistic-style condemnation against the controversies of the Attitude Era, specifically the sexual content. On Sunday Night Heat, on September 13, Runnels was walking through the crowd carrying a sign expressing his views when he decided to jump the barrier and assault Val Venis, whose gimmick was that of a pornographic film star, from behind with the sign. The next night on Raw, Venis responded by showing Runnels one of his films, The Preacher's Wife, which showed Venis with Runnels' wife, Terri Runnels. The two met at the Breakdown: In Your House pay-per-view with Venis coming out on top due to interference from Terri. The following night on Raw, Runnels revealed the nature of his evangelist message "He is coming" when the arena turned gold and a video played, presaging the return of his erstwhile persona, Goldust. During Heat on the night of Judgment Day: In Your House, Goldust further mocked Venis by sending him a present as he was guest commentating. It was a gold-coated protective cup.

Irate at being hospitalized by Kane and The Undertaker, Vince McMahon returned to work and instantly stripped Triple H of his Intercontinental Title mid-week on October 9 due to a knee injury. A quick tournament was held the following week on Raw is War, which saw Ken Shamrock crowned with his first WWF championship after assaulting X-Pac (Sean Waltman) to aid him in the final.

After losing the European Championship to X-Pac on the September 21 episode of Raw is War, D'Lo Brown got a rematch and won the title back when X-Pac was caught on the outside of the ring by Nation member Mark Henry, who ran X-Pac into the ring post and then back into the ring, setting him up for a Lo Down from Brown.

== Event ==
Other on-screen personnel
Role:	Name:
English commentators	Jim Ross
English commentators	Jerry Lawler
Spanish commentators	Carlos Cabrera
Spanish commentators	Hugo Savinovich
Interviewer	Michael Cole
Ring announcers	Tony Chimel (Sunday Night Heat)
Ring announcers	Howard Finkel (PPV)
Referees	Tim White
Referees	Earl Hebner
Referees	Jim Korderas
Referees	Bruce Prichard
Referees	"Stone Cold" Steve Austin (Kane vs. The Undertaker)

=== Sunday Night Heat ===
Before the broadcast began Steve Blackman pinned Bradshaw after a pump kick. Also The Oddities (Giant Silva, Kurrgan and Golga) defeated Los Boricuas (Jose Estrada, Miguel Pérez, Jr. and Jesus Castillo) by pinfall after Golga struck Castillo with the Avalanche Splash. The final two non-pay-per-view matches were The Godfather using a thrust kick on Faarooq before pinning him and Jeff Jarrett lost to Scorpio with a roll-up pin.

=== Preliminary matches ===
The actual pay-per-view started with Al Snow facing Marc Mero. Before the match, Jeff Jarrett came to the ring, trying to goad Snow into a fight. While Snow was distracted with Jarrett, Mero hit him from behind but it did little to help his plight, Snow slamming Mero from an Irish whip and landing him on the ground several times. Mero tried taunting Snow by attacking Head but Snow stopped him before he could manage it and later in the match, Snow moonsaulted onto Mero but rather than attempt a pin he was distracted by Jacqueline on the apron, allowing Mero to lowblow him. Mero then replied with his own moonsault crossbody but could not secure a three count. Snow then gained momentum after his trademark series of headbutts, followed by an enziguiri. When he tried another moonsault, though, Jacqueline pulled Mero out of the way reversing the match briefly until Snow rolled out of a Wild Thing, only stopping a pin count with his foot on the bottom rope. In the ensuing struggle Mero set up the TKO but as he swung Snow round, the wrestler found his way back onto his feet and pinned Mero after a Snow Plow.

The six-man tag team match began with Animal being whipped around the ring by Skull but after clearing him from the ring, Hawk was tagged in and despite some reversal attempts on Skull, continued to dominate until he tagged in Droz who, after being distracted by 8-Ball on the ring apron, suffered at the hands of Disciples of Apocalypse who illegally choked him in the corner. Eventually Paul Ellering made a brief appearance, kicking Droz before tagging back out. With a flukey DDT, Droz managed to pause the match, eventually making a tag to Hawk and as all of the six man fought, Droz took Ellering and 8-Ball out of the ring. Skull, meanwhile, was set up for the Doomsday Device after which Droz ran back in the ring and took the pin, despite not being the legal man, much to the chagrin of Hawk.

The first of five championship matches, for the WWF Light Heavyweight Championship, started with the champion Taka Michinoku kicking Christian out of the ring and flooring him with a suicide top rope crossbody. When Christian tried to reenter the ring, kicks to his midsection left him hanging on the rope and Taka flew a knee drop onto him. Christian managed to gain some momentum after kicking out of the turnbuckle, slowing Taka's dynamism with a falling reverse DDT and afterward delivering a succession of two suplexes and a facebuster. With Taka thrown out of the ring, Christian mimicked the champion with a suicidal crossbody dive. The match was reset even after a big splash from Christian left him floored. Christian then became the recipient of a dropkick to the outside, then a baseball slide finished by an Asai Moonsault. His gesturing to the crowd allowed Christian some rest time though, and Taka could not pin Christian inside the ring, especially after he escaped a Michinoku Driver II. A second attempt at the driver was reversed into a cradle pin, allowing Christian to win the championship on his debut appearance, with Edge watching on from the back of the crowd.

Val Venis' traditional pre-match speech was interrupted when his mic cut out, with Goldust's voice coming over the Tannoy saying, "Hello, Val. I told you he was coming back." Goldust instantly attacked Venis as he climbed in the ring, kneeing him in the face but Venis replied with an elbow into the running Goldust. The match fell out of the ring, with Venis being thrown into the crowd barrier and then into the steel steps. Upon reentering the ring, though, Goldust took the brunt of Venis' rage and was thrown back out and jumped on. A second aerial maneuver saw Venis clotheslined though and at this point Goldust began to dominate the match proper, using a variety of throws to floor Venis and attacking him on the ground. Venis managed to side step a running shoulder barge, leaving Goldust floored outside the ring, something Venis instantly focused on as he dragged Goldust's shoulder into the ring post and back inside the ring dropping his elbow onto the injured shoulder, applying a short-arm scissor submission. When referee Jimmy Korderas checked Goldust's free arm to see if he was unconscious, Goldust refused to give up and after finding his way back to his feet launched a limited assault but Venis continued to target the shoulder, dragging it over the top rope and using a Russian leg sweep variant which extended the arm and shoulder. Venis' attempts at a Money Shot were short lived though, as Goldust climbed the turnbuckle and pulled Venis over into a superplex, not quite managing a three count. The two exchanged sleeper holds and from this Goldust threw Venis into the corner, catching a bulldog on the staggering Venis. Terri Runnels tried to aid Venis by stepping onto the apron, shouting "you ruined my life" at her husband but Goldust ducked Venis' attempt at blindsiding him from behind and as the referee dispatched Terri, Goldust quickly struck Venis with Shattered Dreams to pin him.

D'Lo Brown started his title defence by throwing X-Pac to the ground and boasting to the crowd. The two competitors had a styles clash, Brown opting for arm orientated attacks, with X-Pac utilizing his catalog of kicks, though neither took a notable advantage early on. X-Pac's short run of offense was countered when, in attempting a bronco buster, Brown stuck his foot out causing his opponent to unwittingly low blow himself. This allowed Brown to turn the match firmly in his favor, building momentum into a running powerbomb after which he made a cocky pin, lying backwards on X-Pac and thus not managing a three count. Brown then opted to lift X-Pac onto the turnbuckle and attempt a superplex, but was punched off the ropes and attacked with a flying crossbody, but rolled it into another failed pin attempt. X-Pac retained dominance, though, until he tried a seated senton into Brown's shoulders but was left hanging on the turnbuckle when Brown sidestepped it, almost taking out a cameraman. With a diving knee drop not enough to subdue X-Pac, Brown tried to make him tap out with a cloverleaf but another aerial attack caused him to fall foul of X-Pac's kicks, eventually bucking the bronco successfully. Despite this, and a punch from Chyna, the champion still managed to kick out and in the ensuing brawl, referee Mike Chioda was knocked out, at which point Mark Henry appeared to further his romances on Chyna while Brown used his belt to attack X-Pac but by the time Chioda was back in the ring, X-Pac kicked out. When Brown tried to further his attack with a leaping shoulder block, X-Pac caught him in the X Factor and won the belt via pinfall.

The Headbangers interrupted The New Age Outlaws' pre-match speech and took a short advantage which was recovered when Thrasher made a blind tag to Mosh, allowing him to missile dropkick an unassuming Road Dogg. Headbangers then double teamed Road Dogg, making regular tags to isolate the Outlaw. Road Dogg eventually managed to throw Thrasher into the corner, catching him for a backdrop afterward that allowed both teams to make a tag. Billy Gunn, on the hot tag, took out both Headbangers, delivering clotheslines and a running jumping lariat until Thrasher pulled down the rop from the outside, causing Gunn to fall out onto the mat, before being thrown into the steel steps. This allowed Headbangers to repeat their same tactic, isolating Gunn in their corner and making frequent tags and double team moves. Gunn almost managed to make a tag after a whirling hurricarana floored Mosh but could not make it to his corner in time, allowing Thrasher to catapult Gunn into the bottom rope. After considerable dominance, a double team went awry as Thrasher whipped Mosh into Gunn, but he was caught mid air and slammed into the mat, but Thrasher was successfully tagged in and instantly took out Road Dogg. Infuriated by the tactics, Road Dogg grabbed a boombox and broke it over Thrasher's head, in revenge for the same attack on the previous week's Raw. However, as the match ended in disqualification, the WWF Tag Team Championship did not change hands.

The WWF Intercontinental Championship match began with Ken Shamrock using kicks and leg sweeps to keep Mankind at a distance before morphing an arm bar into a fireman's carry takedown. Shamrock's technical style was shortly overturned by the bruiser style of Mankind, who pushed him into corners delivering punches until, reversing an Irish whip, Mankind applied the mandible claw which Shamrock quickly leapt out from, recuperating outside the ring. When Shamrock entered the ring, Mankind caught him into a full nelson chickenwing submission, from which he tried to apply the mandible claw from behind. As Shamrock escaped back outside the ring, Mankind followed him and threw him into the steel steps. He then picked up a steel chair but as he went to strike down Shamrock, he was kicked in the midsection and Shamrock struck Mankind with the chair instead – the referee did not disqualify Shamrock for it. As the two re-entered the ring, Shamrock tried to submit Mankind with a shoulder lock to which Mankind responded by biting his opponent to escape. Despite this, Shamrock still managed a side belly to belly suplex but to no avail as Mankind pummeled the champion in the corner, finishing with a jumping elbow drop into the Tree of Woe positioned Shamrock. Again the match fell outside of the ring, with Shamrock powerslamming a running Mankind against the steel steps. Despite applying the ankle lock in the middle of the ring, Mankind managed to crawl to the ropes, but was caught in it soon again, pulling his hair out and applying the mandible claw to himself in masochistic frustration. The referee ended the match, with Howard Finkel announcing Shamrock won due to the mandible claw; incensed at this Shamrock kicked Mankind and suplexed the referee, at which point Mankind put on Mr. Socko and applied the mandible claw before leaving the ring.

Despite being introduced together with D'Lo Brown, Mark Henry entered the ring on his own and dedicated a poem to Chyna. The Rock's dynamic opening attacks proved too much for Henry and even managed to suplex the superheavyweight. However, on the outside of the ring Henry used his weight to push Rock against the ring and then slam him against the broadcast table. Henry further used his weight by leaning on The Rock, choking him against the middle rope and keeping the match's pace at a slower rate. After blocking a series of punches, and then returning them, Rocky scoop slammed Henry onto the ground to perform the People's Elbow. However, D'Lo Brown ran to ringside and as The Rock punched him, Henry caught Rock from behind and pinned him with a big splash, with Brown leaning in the ring to hold down his feet, stopping him from kicking out of the pin.

=== Main event ===
Before the WWF Championship match began, The Undertaker shook hands with Kane before guest referee "Stone Cold" Steve Austin made his appearance. Before ordering the bell to be rung, Austin taunted both competitors. Undertaker twisted Kane's arm, delivering Old School as his first move of the match, though was thrown into the turnbuckle soon after and punched. Undertaker soon wrestled his brother down to the mat, going for a pinfall which Austin refused to count, though he mocked him by going into position. As Undertaker argued with Austin, Kane floored him and Austin made an exceptionally fast count for him, but it still only amounted to two. After being clotheslined over the top rope, Kane had his head slammed into the steel steps. Undertaker then tried to use a chair on Kane, with Austin nodding that he would not disqualify him, but the chair met with the ring post anyway. Kane grabbed the stunned Undertaker and toured him round the ring before pushing him back inside. Despite receiving a suplex, Kane instantly sat up and continued to dominate Undertaker until he tried to pick Undertaker up, the brother staying resolutely on the floor and punching Kane. Undertaker furthered his assault on Kane by focusing on his leg, firstly with an elbow drop to the inside thigh before stretching it and then, after some brief attacks by Kane, striking him down by the leg and fixing a side leg lock. The continued submissive style of assault on Kane, based on various technical holds on Kane's legs, met with derisive boos from the crowd but Undertaker carried on, albeit with occasional distraction by the referee. His dominance escaped him when he tried to make a running leap into Kane, and was slammed into the mat for it, allowing Kane to recover somewhat, similarly resting after clotheslining his brother. The match took a strange turn when Undertaker went to Irish whip Kane into the corner, but was thrown back his own way, knocking Austin who was in the corner. As Austin stumbled out of the corner, Kane caught him by the throat and chokeslammed him, after which Undertaker helped hold a choke on Austin. Undertaker soon turned on Kane though, kicking him from behind as the two resumed fighting, with Kane chokeslamming Undertaker.

At this point Paul Bearer, Kane’s former manager and storyline father, came to the ring brandishing a chair. He acted like he was going to strike Undertaker for his son, but instead Bearer struck Kane. Although Kane was unaffected by the chair shot, he turned his attention to Bearer and Undertaker took advantage of the momentary distraction to lay Kane out with the chair.

Undertaker moved to cover Kane for the pin but Austin refused to count the fall. Undertaker began arguing with Austin, who responded by giving Undertaker a Stone Cold Stunner, which momentarily dazed him. Austin then picked up the chair and struck Undertaker with it, knocking him out cold. With both Kane and Undertaker flat on their backs, Austin dropped down and slapped the mat three times, then took the microphone and declared himself the winner of the match just as he said he would do.

Austin then left the ring and headed toward the backstage area, looking for McMahon and calling for him to make good on his threat to fire him. Unable to find McMahon, he came back to the ring and began taunting McMahon, who unbeknownst to everyone in the arena was sitting in the technical box behind the giant video screen above the entranceway. Shortly after Austin returned to the ring, McMahon took a microphone and ordered the screen to be raised so Austin could see him. He then made good on his previous threat and fired Austin as he stood in the ring, taunting him by telling the fans they should commemorate the moment with pictures because this would be the last they saw of him. McMahon then left the box in the company of his bodyguard The Big Boss Man, while Austin vowed that McMahon had not seen the last of him.

== Reception ==
The event has received mixed reviews from critics.

In 2008, J.D. Dunn of 411Mania gave the event a rating of 7.0 [Good], stating, "This was the rare occasion in 1998 where good wrestling met good writing on the same PPV. Sure, it was another case of building the TV show with a PPV, but it wound up working in the short run because more TV viewers meant a wider pool to advertise the PPVs to. Thumbs up."

In 2017, Kevin Pantoja of 411Mania gave the event a rating of 6.0 [Average], stating, "A fairly average show in the midst of a red-hot era. The main event is atrocious and Austin getting fired ended things on real damper. Rock/Henry, the Tag Titles and the LOD tag were all pretty bad. The rest of the card delivers though. X-Pac and D-Lo had their best match together, while Val/Goldust is solid and the Intercontinental Title match was fun. Snow/Mero was as good as it could have been, while the Light Heavyweight Title was decent. It felt like a WCW PPV where the undercard was solid and the main event fell flat, while the opposite was usually true for WWE in this era."

In 2022, Paul Matthews of Classic Wrestling Review described the event as "below-average," stating, "Breakdown was average. This show was below-average. Again, it wasn't terrible. Nothing was outright bad, but much of it was flat. Outside of the ending, it was forgettable. It’s a shame. The episodes of RAW between Breakdown and Judgment Day were some of the best of the Attitude Era. But the event didn’t live up to the hype."

== Aftermath ==
Since Austin did not crown a new champion at the event, the WWF Championship was still vacated, leading to a tournament to crown a new champion at Survivor Series. The Rock would win the tournament and the title by beating Mankind in the finals in the same fashion as the Montreal Screwjob the previous year when The Rock locked Mankind in the Sharpshooter before Mr. McMahon called for the bell despite Mankind not submitting. The Rock was awarded the title by McMahon leading to the two forming an alliance that would start the beginning of The Corporation.

Despite being fired, "Stone Cold" Steve Austin appeared on Raw the following night and held Mr. McMahon at gunpoint. The gun would be revealed as a joke gun firing a flag with BANG! 3:16 on it. Austin left the ring upon McMahon soiling his pants after giving him a piece of paper. Austin revealed the following week that the paper was a five-year contract with a guaranteed championship match that was signed by McMahon's son Shane, who was stripped of his owner rights by his father and demoted into a referee.

The Undertaker and Paul Bearer reunited after Judgment Day, with Bearer admitting to Kane that he had been using him all along since he had brought him to the WWF the previous year. Undertaker ominously announced that he would begin to form what he referred to as his "ministry of darkness" over the weeks to come and would unleash a plague on the WWF. By the end of the year, Undertaker would initiate Mideon, Bradshaw, and Faarooq to his group.

The In Your House branding was retired following February 1999's St. Valentine's Day Massacre: In Your House event, as the company moved to install permanent names for each of its monthly PPVs. After two years, Judgment Day returned in May 2000 as its own PPV event and thus established Judgment Day as the annual May PPV for the promotion that was renamed to World Wrestling Entertainment (WWE) in 2002. The 2000 event replaced Over the Edge following the death of Owen Hart at that event. Judgment Day would then continue for another nine years, with the final produced in 2009, after which, Judgment Day was discontinued and replaced by Over the Limit in 2010.

== Results ==
No.	Results	Stipulations	Times
1^{H}	Steve Blackman defeated Bradshaw	Singles match	2:58
2^{H}	The Oddities (Giant Silva, Golga, and Kurrgan) (with Luna Vachon, Shaggy 2 Dope, and Violent J) defeated Los Boricuas (Jesus Castillo, Jose Estrada, and Miguel Pérez Jr.)	Six-man tag team match	2:32
3^{H}	The Godfather (with 2 Hos) defeated Faarooq	Singles match	1:55
4^{H}	Scorpio defeated Jeff Jarrett	Singles match	3:42
5	Al Snow (with Head) defeated Marc Mero (with Jacqueline)	Singles match	7:12
6	LOD 2000 (Animal, Droz, and Hawk) defeated The Disciples of Apocalypse (8-Ball, Paul Ellering, and Skull)	Six-man tag team match	5:04
7	Christian (with Gangrel) defeated Taka Michinoku (c) (with Yamaguchi-san)	Singles match for the WWF Light Heavyweight Championship	8:35
8	Goldust defeated Val Venis (with Terri Runnels)	Singles match	12:05
9	X-Pac (with Chyna) defeated D'Lo Brown (c)	Singles match for the WWF European Championship	14:37
10	The Headbangers (Mosh and Thrasher) defeated The New Age Outlaws (Billy Gunn and Road Dogg) (c) by disqualification	Tag team match for the WWF Tag Team Championship	14:00
11	Ken Shamrock (c) defeated Mankind by technical submission	Singles match for the WWF Intercontinental Championship	14:36
12	Mark Henry defeated The Rock	Singles match	5:06
13	Kane vs. The Undertaker ended in a double pinfall	Singles match for the vacant WWF Championship "Stone Cold" Steve Austin was the special guest referee. Since Austin did not crown a new champion, he was (kayfabe) fired.	17:39
(c) / – the champion(s) heading into the match; H / – the match was broadcast prior to the pay-per-view on Sunday Night Heat
