= In Your House 3 =

1995 World Wrestling Federation pay-per-view event

- VHS cover featuring Yokozuna, Diesel, Shawn Michaels, and Owen Hart
- Promotion: World Wrestling Federation
- Date: September 24, 1995
- City: Saginaw, Michigan
- Venue: Saginaw Civic Center
- Attendance: 5,146
- Buy rate: 160,000
- Tagline: 3 Belts – One Match!

Pay-per-view chronology
| ← Previous; SummerSlam | Next → In Your House 4 |

In Your House chronology
| ← Previous; 2 | Next → 4 |

In Your House 3, retroactively titled In Your House 3: Triple Header, was a 1995 professional wrestling pay-per-view (PPV) event produced by the World Wrestling Federation (WWF, renamed WWE in 2002). It was the third In Your House and took place on September 24, 1995, at the Saginaw Civic Center in Saginaw, Michigan. The event's retroactive renaming was in reference to the main event of the show featuring all three active men's championships in the WWF at the time being defended.

The PPV portion of the show featured six matches in total, while four dark matches also occurred. In the main event, WWF Champion Diesel teamed with WWF Intercontinental Champion Shawn Michaels to challenge WWF Tag Team Champions Yokozuna and Owen Hart in a match where the person who was pinned would lose their respective championship. As part of the storyline, the WWF replaced Hart with The British Bulldog due to Hart's wife being in labor. Hart ultimately appeared at the show and was pinned to end the match, but since he was not deemed the legal man, the next night on Raw, the WWF Tag Team Championship was awarded back to Hart and Yokozuna.

With the launch of the WWE Network in 2014, the PPV section became available to subscribers to view on demand.

== Production ==
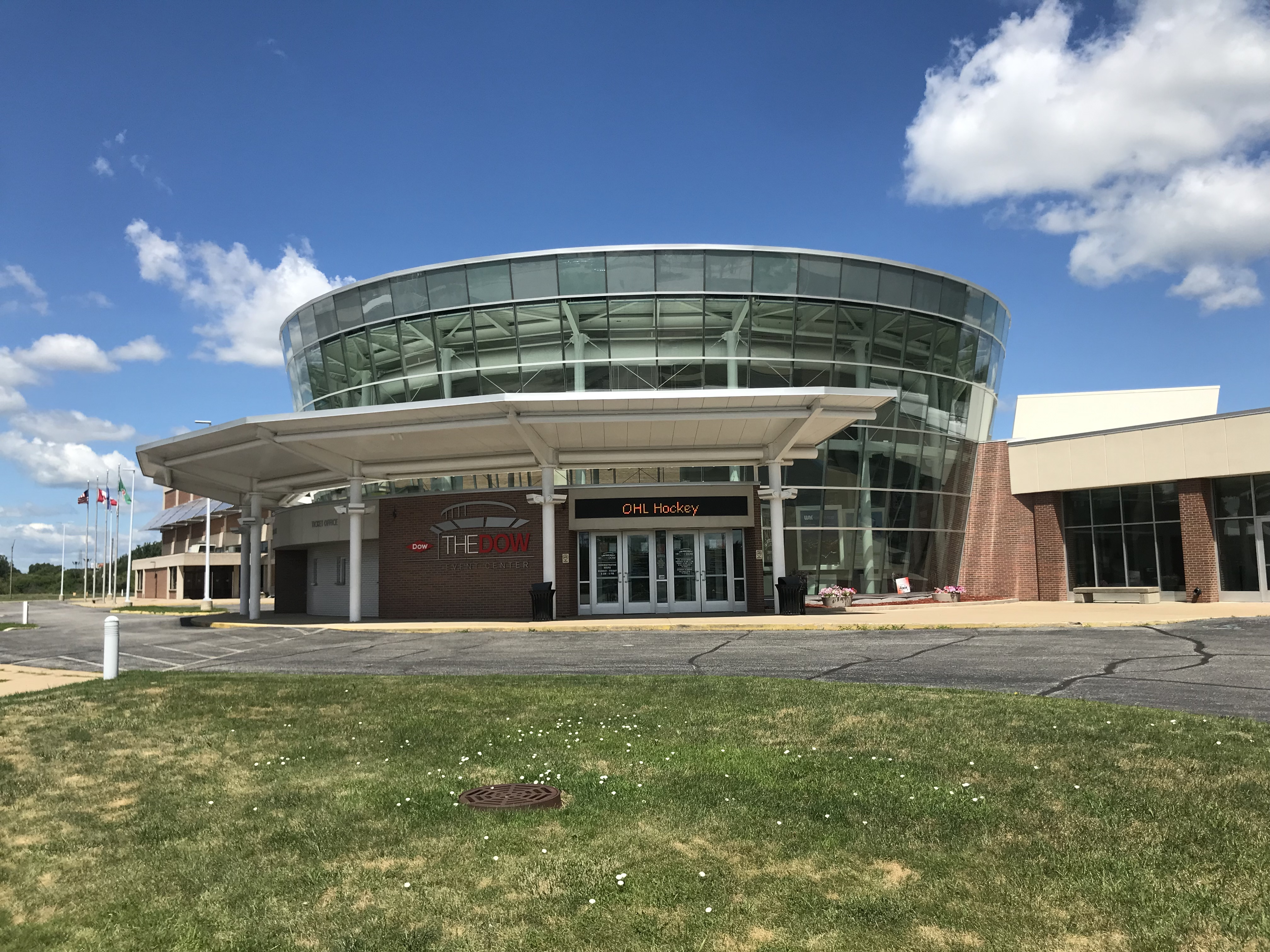
The third In Your House was held in Saginaw, Michigan at the Saginaw Civic Center (pictured as Dow Event Center, renamed in 2004).

=== Background ===
In Your House was a series of monthly professional wrestling pay-per-view (PPV) events first produced by the World Wrestling Federation (WWF, renamed WWE in 2002) in May 1995. They aired when the promotion was not holding one of its then-five major PPVs (WrestleMania, King of the Ring, SummerSlam, Survivor Series, and Royal Rumble) and were sold at a lower cost. The third In Your House was scheduled for September 24, 1995, at the Saginaw Civic Center in Saginaw, Michigan. While this event was originally known simply as In Your House 3, it was later retroactively renamed as In Your House 3: Triple Header in reference to the main event of the PPV featuring all three of the WWF's active men's championships at the time being defended: the WWF Championship, the WWF Intercontinental Championship, and the WWF Tag Team Championship.

== Event ==
Other on-screen personnel
| Role | Name |
|---|---|
| Commentators | Vince McMahon |
| Commentators | Jerry Lawler |
| Commentators | Jim Ross |
| Ring announcer | Manny Garcia |
| Referees | Mike Chioda |
| Referees | Danny Davis |
| Referees | Jack Doan |
| Referees | Tim White |
| Referees | Earl Hebner |
| Referees | Dave Hebner |
| Interviewers | Dok Hendrix |

In the main event, three championships were on the line: Diesel's WWF Championship, Shawn Michaels's Intercontinental Championship, and Yokozuna and Owen Hart's Tag Team Championship. The stipulation was that whoever was pinned would lose their respective title: if Diesel had been pinned, he would have lost the WWF Championship to whoever scored the pin between Yokozuna and Hart; if Michaels had been pinned, he would have lost the Intercontinental Championship to whoever scored the pin between Yokozuna and Hart; and if either Yokozuna or Hart were pinned, they would have lost the Tag Team Championship to Diesel and Michaels. On the night of the show, the WWF announced that The British Bulldog had to replace Hart in the match as Hart was with his wife at the hospital, as she was giving birth to their second child. Near the end of the match, it was revealed that this was just a storyline as Hart rushed to the ring in full wrestling gear and interfered in the match. Moments later, Diesel pinned Hart to win the match, and supposedly the Tag Team Championship for him and Michaels, but it was later announced that while Diesel and Michaels did win the match, they did not win the Tag Team Championship as Hart was not the legal man in the match.

== Aftermath ==
The following month's In Your House, In Your House 4 on October 22, 1995, saw Diesel successfully defend the WWF Championship against the British Bulldog, concluding the feud that had been building since the Bulldog turned on Diesel in August of that year. At the same show, it was revealed that Shawn Michaels was unable to compete after being in a fight with several Marines, and he had to forfeit the WWF Intercontinental Championship to Dean Douglas. Yokozuna, and Owen Hart were given the tag team championship belts back after In Your House 3, but lost them to The Smoking Gunns (Billy Gunn and Bart Gunn) a short time later.

== Results ==
| No. | Results | Stipulations | Times |
|---|---|---|---|
| 1^{D} | Hunter Hearst Helmsley defeated Fatu | Singles match | 10:20 |
| 2 | Savio Vega defeated Waylon Mercy | Singles match | 7:06 |
| 3 | Sycho Sid (with Ted DiBiase) defeated Henry O. Godwinn | Singles match | 7:23 |
| 4 | The British Bulldog defeated Bam Bam Bigelow | Singles match | 12:00 |
| 5 | Dean Douglas (with Bob Backlund) defeated Razor Ramon | Singles match | 14:53 |
| 6 | Bret Hart defeated Jean-Pierre Lafitte via submission | Singles match | 16:37 |
| 7 | Diesel (WWF) and Shawn Michaels (Intercontinental) defeated The British Bulldog (Note: The British Bulldog was replacement for Owen Hart.) and Yokozuna (Tag Team) (with Jim Cornette and Mr. Fuji) | Tag team match for the WWF Championship, WWF Intercontinental Championship, and WWF Tag Team Championship; The stipulation was that whoever was pinned would lose their respective title. | 15:42 |
| 8^{D} | Goldust defeated Bob Holly | Singles match | 12:11 |
| 9^{D} | Ahmed Johnson defeated Skip (with Sunny) | Singles match | 5:30 |
| 10^{D} | The Undertaker (with Paul Bearer) defeated King Mabel (with Sir Mo) | Singles match | 7:04 |
D / – this was a dark match
