= In Your House 4 =

1995 World Wrestling Federation pay-per-view event

- VHS cover featuring Diesel and The British Bulldog
- Promotion: World Wrestling Federation
- Date: October 22, 1995
- City: Winnipeg, Manitoba, Canada
- Venue: Winnipeg Arena
- Attendance: 10,339
- Buy rate: 90,000

Pay-per-view chronology
← Previous; In Your House 3	Next → Survivor Series

In Your House chronology
← Previous; 3	Next → 5

WWE in Canada chronology
← Previous; WrestleMania VI	Next → In Your House 9: International Incident

In Your House 4, retroactively titled In Your House 4: Great White North, was a 1995 professional wrestling pay-per-view (PPV) event produced by the American promotion World Wrestling Federation (WWF, renamed WWE in 2002). It was the fourth In Your House and took place on October 22, 1995, at the Winnipeg Arena in Winnipeg, Manitoba, Canada. The event's retroactive renaming was in reference to it taking place in Canada, which was the WWF's first pay-per-view event to take place in the country since WrestleMania VI in 1990.

Six professional wrestling matches were featured on the PPV portion of the show, with four additional matches held as dark matches. The main event of the show featured WWF Champion Diesel defending the championship against The British Bulldog. The show was supposed to feature Shawn Michaels defending the WWF Intercontinental Championship against Dean Douglas, but Michaels was physically not able to compete on the show and had to forfeit the championship. In its place, Douglas defended and lost the championship to Razor Ramon.

With the launch of the WWE Network in 2014, this show became available on demand but does not include the dark matches held before and after the main show.

== Production ==
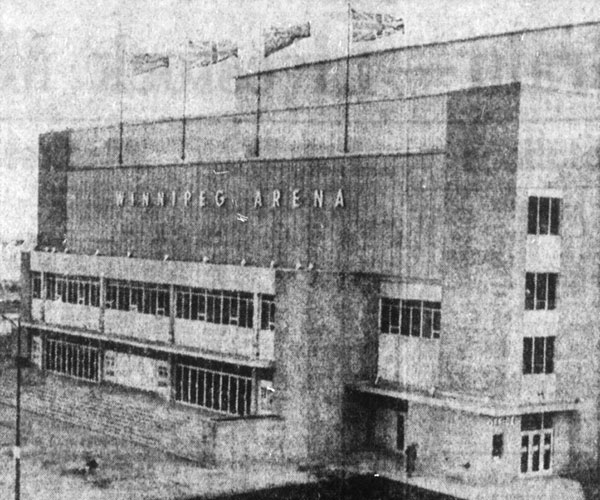
The fourth In Your House was held at the Winnipeg Arena in Winnipeg, Manitoba, Canada, which was the World Wrestling Federation's first pay-per-view event in the country since WrestleMania VI in 1990.

=== Background ===
In Your House was a series of monthly professional wrestling pay-per-view (PPV) events first produced by the American company World Wrestling Federation (WWF, renamed WWE in 2002) in May 1995. They aired when the promotion was not holding one of its then-five major PPVs (WrestleMania, King of the Ring, SummerSlam, Survivor Series, and Royal Rumble) and were sold at a lower cost. The fourth In Your House was scheduled for October 22, 1995, at the Winnipeg Arena in Winnipeg, Manitoba, Canada. While this event was originally known simply as In Your House 4, it was later retroactively renamed as In Your House 4: Great White North as a reference to it being held in Canada. This was the WWF's first pay-per-view event to take place in the country since WrestleMania VI in 1990.

=== Storylines ===
The professional wrestling matches at In Your House 4 featured professional wrestlers performing as characters in scripted events pre-determined by the hosting promotion, the WWF. Storylines between the characters played out on WWF's primary television program, Monday Night Raw.

On August 21, 1995, WWF Champion Diesel teamed up with Davey Boy Smith to take on the team known as Men on a Mission (King Mabel and Sir Mo) in the main event of the WWF's Monday Night Raw show. Up until that day Davey Boy Smith had always been a face in the WWF, but turned on Diesel that night, attacking him and then leaving him alone to fight off King Mabel and Sir Mo. The storyline was picked up against at In Your House 3 when The British Bulldog (Smith was billed exclusively as the British Bulldog by then) teamed up with Yokozuna to take on Diesel and Shawn Michaels in the main event. On September 25 the British Bulldog lost a match to the Undertaker by disqualification as he kept attacking his opponent, which led to Diesel running to the ring to chase the British Bulldog off. Two weeks later the Bulldog pinned Diesel during a six-man tag team match, earning a title match in the process. In the weeks leading up to In Your House 4, the WWF Intercontinental Champion Shawn Michaels had been targeted by the heel Dean Douglas, who claimed to be both intellectually and physically superior to Michaels. In the days before the In Your House show, Shawn Michaels was beaten up by a single Marine outside of a bar, which meant that he was unable to compete at the In Your House show against Dean Douglas.

== Event ==
Other on-screen personnel
Role	Name
Commentators	Vince McMahon
Commentators	Jerry Lawler
Commentators	Jim Ross
Ring announcer	Manny Garcia
Referees	Jack Doan
Referees	Tim White
Referees	Earl Hebner
Interviewers	Dok Hendrix

In the third match of the night, the reigning WWF Tag Team Champions The Smoking Gunns (Billy Gunn and Bart Gunn) successfully defended the championship against the team of The 1-2-3 Kid, and Razor Ramon when the Kid and Ramon were not able to work together as a cohesive unit. Following the match, the 1-2-3 Kid turned on his partner, finally taking the next step in the storyline between the two. The fourth match of the night was the debut of Goldust (Dustin Rhodes) in the WWF and the first time the audience saw the character live and not via pre-taped segments. On this night, Goldust defeated Marty Jannetty. The sixth match was supposed to feature Shawn Michaels defending the Intercontinental championship against Dean Douglas, but when Michaels was unable to compete, Douglas was awarded the championship by forfeit. Gorilla Monsoon, then interim WWF President, announced that while he won the championship without a match he would have to defend the championship in a surprise match against Razor Ramon. Playing up the storyline that Dean Douglas was not prepared for Razor Ramon, Ramon defeated Douglas to win the championship, making Douglas the shortest reigning Intercontinental champion, with his reign only lasting the length of the match. Bret Hart joined the commentary team for the main event between Diesel and the British Bulldog to push the fact that Bret Hart was next in line for the championship. In the end, Bret Hart ended up hitting the British Bulldog, causing the champion to be disqualified, losing the match but not the title. Afterward, Diesel attacked Bret in retaliation for costing Diesel the match.

== Reception ==
Apart from Vince McMahon expressing his anger at the main event, the event was ranked 10th by YouTube wrestling channel Cultaholic in their 2021 list of 10 Worst WWE PPVs ever.

== Aftermath ==
Bret Hart ended up defeating Diesel to win the WWF Championship a month later in the main event of the 1995 Survivor Series. The title loss led to Diesel's character gaining more of an edge, and attitude, teasing his eventual heel turn. After his disqualification victory over Diesel, the British Bulldog got the first title match against the new champion, losing to Bret Hart at In Your House 5. After his brief run with the Intercontinental championship, Dean Douglas was moved out of the championship picture, relegating him to mid-card storylines before he left the WWF by the end of 1995.

The Diesel vs British Bulldog main event was very poorly received, it also angered Vince McMahon (who was doing commentary) to the point that he reportedly threw his headset off after the match and the pay-per-view had finished and yelled "horrible, fucking horrible!" at Diesel in the ring and stormed to the back and launched a verbal tirade at producer Bruce Prichard. Bulldog as soon as he got backstage after the match immediately apologised to agents and producers for how bad the match was. Years later, Kevin Nash said that this was a sign his time in the company was coming to an end.

== Results ==
No.	Results	Stipulations	Times
1^{D}	Bob Holly defeated Rad Radford	Singles match	4:02
2	Hunter Hearst Helmsley defeated Fatu	Singles match	8:06
3	The Smoking Gunns (Billy and Bart) (c) defeated The 1-2-3 Kid and Razor Ramon	Tag team match for the WWF Tag Team Championship	12:46
4	Goldust defeated Marty Jannetty	Singles match	11:15
5	King Mabel (with Sir Mo) vs. Yokozuna (with Mr. Fuji and Jim Cornette) ended in a double countout	Singles match	5:12
6	Razor Ramon defeated Dean Douglas (c)	Singles match for the WWF Intercontinental Championship	11:01
7	The British Bulldog (with Jim Cornette) defeated Diesel (c) by disqualification	Singles match for the WWF Championship	18:14
8^{D}	Henry O. Godwinn defeated Sycho Sid	Singles match	12:34
9^{D}	Owen Hart and Yokozuna (with Mr Fuji and Jim Cornette) defeated Savio Vega and Bam Bam Bigelow	Tag team match	13:22
10^{D}	Bret Hart defeated Isaac Yankem, DDS	Singles match	14:10
(c) / – the champion(s) heading into the match; D / – this was a dark match

== Other on-screen personnel ==
Commentators

- Vince McMahon
- Jerry Lawler
- Jim Ross

Interviewers

- Dok Hendrix

Ring announcer

- Manny Garcia

Referees

- Jack Doan
- Tim White
- Earl Hebner

== See also ==
- Professional wrestling in Canada
