= St. Valentine's Day Massacre: In Your House =

1999 World Wrestling Federation pay-per-view event

- Promotion poster featuring Vince McMahon
- Promotion: World Wrestling Federation
- Date: February 14, 1999
- City: Memphis, Tennessee
- Venue: Pyramid Arena
- Attendance: 19,028
- Buy rate: 450,000
- Tagline: There's no love lost in this In Your House classic featuring the biggest Superstars of The Attitude Era

Pay-per-view chronology
← Previous; Royal Rumble	Next → WrestleMania XV

In Your House chronology
← Previous; Rock Bottom	Next → NXT TakeOver: In Your House

St. Valentine's Day Massacre: In Your House was a 1999 professional wrestling pay-per-view (PPV) event produced by the World Wrestling Federation (WWF, renamed WWE in 2002). It was the 27th In Your House and took place on Valentine's Day on February 14, 1999, at the Pyramid Arena in Memphis, Tennessee. In addition to its holiday scheduling, the event's title alluded to the Saint Valentine's Day massacre of 1929, which saw seven people murdered as a part of the gang war between Al Capone and Bugs Moran. This was the final In Your House until June 2020, as at the time, the WWF moved to install permanent names for its monthly PPVs, which began with Backlash in April.

Eight professional wrestling matches were scheduled on the event's card. The first main event was for the WWF Championship. As The Rock and Mankind had fought many times previously with ambiguous match endings, it was decided their title match would be a Last Man Standing match, a match where a wrestler loses if they cannot stand up before the referee's counts of 10. The second main event was a steel cage match between "Stone Cold" Steve Austin and WWF owner Vince McMahon to decide if Austin would go on to headline WrestleMania XV the following month. The event also saw the WWF debut of Paul Wight, formerly known as The Giant in World Championship Wrestling (WCW), who would later be renamed the Big Show.

== Production ==
=== Background ===
The 27th In Your House was held at the Pyramid Arena in Memphis, Tennessee.

In Your House was a series of monthly professional wrestling pay-per-view (PPV) events first produced by the World Wrestling Federation (WWF, renamed WWE in 2002) in May 1995. They aired when the promotion was not holding one of its then-five major PPVs (WrestleMania, King of the Ring, SummerSlam, Survivor Series, and Royal Rumble) and were sold at a lower cost. The 27th In Your House, titled St. Valentine's Day Massacre: In Your House, was scheduled for Valentine's Day on February 14, 1999, at the Pyramid Arena in Memphis, Tennessee. In addition to its holiday scheduling, the event's title alluded to the Saint Valentine's Day massacre of 1929, which saw seven people murdered as part of the gang war between Al Capone and Bugs Moran.

=== Storylines ===
The leader of The J.O.B. Squad, Al Snow had his mascot, a mannequin head he believed to be sentient, stolen from him by Goldust, who restyled the head in keeping with his makeup style. In a match on the edition of January 25 of Raw is War, The Blue Meanie made his WWF debut by coming through the crowd, and stealing the head back for Snow. The following week on February 1, Goldust attacked Blue Meanie, but the night before the event, on a special Saturday Night Raw, Goldust lost a match to perennial jobber Gillberg when Meanie distracted him with a video parodying the wrestler, renaming himself Bluedust. After the match was over, the arena went dark with a blue hue, similar to Goldust's effect of a gold hue, and Goldust had been disgraced by having blue paint poured over him.

In the first few weeks of the year, The Road Dogg, and Al Snow had formed an ad hoc hardcore tag team, but, after losing to The Acolytes, they had a dispute, and Snow challenged Road Dogg to a match to decide who was more hardcore. When The Road Dogg was attacked backstage, and could not fight, Snow began to have a match with himself by hitting himself with weapons, and moonsaulting into a table. Fellow J.O.B. Squad member Bob Holly came to the ring, and tried to talk sense into him, but found himself brawling instead. When it was discovered the attack on Road Dogg would prevent him defending the WWF Hardcore Championship, a match between the two J.O.B. Squad members was made for the vacant championship.

As part of his "Sexual Chocolate" gimmick, Mark Henry was having delusions of grandeur about his status with the opposite sex. When he flirted with Debra, she pretended to be attracted to him when the wrestler she managed, Jeff Jarrett attacked Henry from behind. To try to prevent Debra from further distracting Henry, his tag team partner D'Lo Brown introduced him to a new woman in their corner Ivory in the hope that Henry would not be distracted in their match against the new WWF Tag Team Champions.

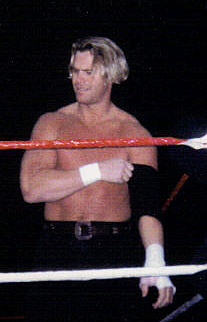
"Badd Ass" Billy Gunn volunteered himself to officiate the Intercontinental Championship match

When Ken Shamrock's sister came to support her brother at ringside, she gained the attention of Billy Gunn, who mooned her, and Val Venis, who danced with her. Despite the overbearing attempts of Shamrock to keep his sister chaste, she was soon shown to have appeared in Val Venis' "adult film" Saving Ryan's Privates, and, despite Shamrock promising he would not put his hands on Venis, this did not stop him from attacking Venis with a steel chair. Although Shamrock put up his Intercontinental Championship for the event, he could not contain his rage and attacked Venis again when he was interviewing in the ring. When the referees and officials tried to break them up, Shamrock attacked them all leading to senior referee Earl Hebner refusing to offer services in the match for fear of his safety and that of the team of referees. In a later segment with D-Generation X, Billy Gunn took off his top to reveal a referee shirt, volunteering to officiate the match.

The night after the Royal Rumble, Triple H demanded an "I Quit" match with The Rock, questioning the dubious circumstances that the one had ended the previous night. During the match, Triple H was just about to put Rock through the announce table when The Corporation appeared and threatened that Kane would chokeslam his bodyguard Chyna if he did not quit the match. When he did, The Corporation left but Chyna revealed that she had switched sides by lowblowing Triple H. The following week Triple H had a steel cage match with Kane which he won thanks to some help from X-Pac after Chyna also interfered. After the match she threatened her erstwhile partner telling him she had a special St. Valentine's Day gift for him.

When The Rock became WWF Champion at Survivor Series, it was under dubious circumstances aimed at recreating the Montreal Screwjob, meaning that his opponent Mankind lost the match by submission without actually tapping out. The following month at Rock Bottom: In Your House Mankind won a championship match by causing Rock to pass out from the mandible claw but again Vince McMahon would prevent Mankind from becoming champion by claiming that Rock did not technically tap out. Due to the ambiguous circumstances Mankind eventually gained a championship match on the January 4 edition of Raw is War which he won only to lose it again at the Royal Rumble in an "I Quit" match thanks to a recording of his voice being played and win it back again in an Empty Arena match on Halftime Heat during Super Bowl XXXIII by trapping Rock underneath a forklift. Going into WrestleMania XV, a decision needed to be made over who the champion would be and thus a match with no seeming ambiguity over its end was booked, a Last Man Standing match where the winner is the wrestler left standing.

When Vince McMahon won the Royal Rumble he earned a match against the WWF Champion at WrestleMania XV, but at the time, it seemed as if that champion was fellow Corporate member The Rock. Not a full-time wrestler, McMahon announced on the January 25 episode of Raw Is War that he was vacating his place at WrestleMania and that he was appointing a new #1 contender for the WWF championship match at WrestleMania XV presumably to keep the title within The Corporation as stable member The Rock then held the title. However he was informed by Commissioner Shawn Michaels that if the winner was incapable of wrestling in the WrestleMania main event, then the runner-up would take their place. Being that the runner-up was McMahon's rival "Stone Cold" Steve Austin, this enraged McMahon and Austin used this to goad McMahon into a match for McMahon to regain his #1 contendership. Explaining that even more than a WWF Championship match, he wanted another chance to fight McMahon without any legal ramifications so much that he would risk his WrestleMania place for a chance at the match, and to make sure that it was just one-on-one it would take place inside a steel cage Mcmahon would agree to the match and promised that The Corporation would be banned from ringside or from interfering for the match. The night before on Raw Saturday Night (actually filmed the preceding Monday), McMahon made Austin run the gauntlet against all The Corporation members ending with McMahon pinning a weakened Austin.

== Event ==
Other on-screen personnel
Role:	Name:
English commentators	Michael Cole
English commentators	Jerry Lawler
Spanish commentators	Carlos Cabrera
Spanish commentators	Hugo Savinovich
Interviewer	Kevin Kelly
Ring announcer	Howard Finkel
Referees	Mike Chioda
Referees	Earl Hebner
Referees	Jim Korderas
Referees	Theodore Long
Referees	Tim White

Before the pay-per-view went to air, two matches were contested on Sunday Night Heat. Corporate member Test was disqualified in a match against Ministry of Darkness member Viscera. Tiger Ali Singh's match against Billy Gunn would go to a no contest.

The opening match began with Goldust delivering a spinebuster to Bluedust. Bluedust's attempt to back-body drop his opponent to reverse affairs was met with a punch in the face, causing him to flee until Goldust brought him back into the ring, and tried to deliver Shattered Dreams, but Bluedust escaped the position and kicked a running Goldust to the ground. His attempt at a Meaniesault miscued and when he rose to his feet, Goldust used the Curtain Call to pin him then successfully delivering Shattered Dreams after the pinfall.

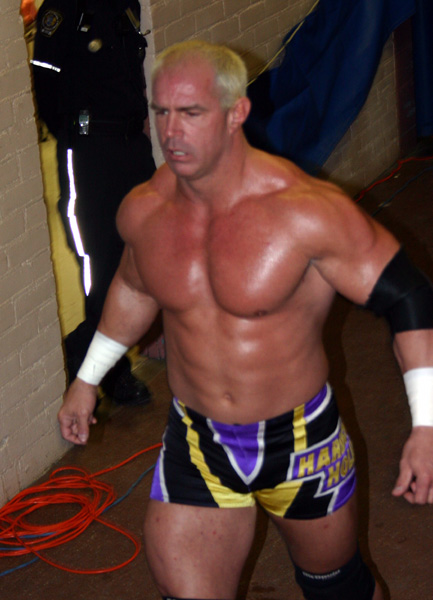
Bob Holly became the new Hardcore Champion at the event.

The hardcore match between the two J.O.B. Squad members began with Al Snow throwing Bob Holly out of the ring and hitting him with a chair before throwing him into the crowd. By the first tier of fans, Holly managed to reverse things, finding a chair to strike Snow with before blinding him with a fire extinguisher and breaking a glass jar over Snow's head. Snow returned with a blast from the fire extinguisher going through to the backstage area where he was thrown into technical boxes. Holly then found floor tiles to break over Snow's head as well as a beer cooler. Snow managed to escape into the car park, using mop handles to break over Holly's back. The two found their way past the car park onto the banks of the Mississippi River. Snow kicked Holly to the floor and choked him before throwing him into the river, Snow was dragged into the river soon after. Snow escaped the river but Holly chased him, tripping him over to wrap Snow in a chain fence, making it virtually impossible to kick out of the pinfall.

The third match began with Big Boss Man gaining an advantage by delivering a low blow to Mideon. He then chased him out of the ring with a chair but hit it against the ring post after which Mideon countered by biting Boss Man's fingers. Inside the ring Boss Man dominated Mideon, throwing him around and jumping on him, using the ropes to choke him and jump on him. Although Mideon offered some attempts at fighting back, he ran into a Big Boss Slam and was pinned. As the match ended, the ring was surrounded by the Ministry of Darkness and the lights then went off as The Undertaker made his way to the ring. When the lights came back on Boss Man was being held down in the ring while Viscera delivered three big splashes to him before being carried away by the Ministry.

After a brief fight between Owen Hart and Mark Henry, D'Lo Brown and Jeff Jarrett were tagged in. Brown used a dropkick to floor Hart and tried to pin him but was it broken up by Jarrett. Hart then isolated Brown, tagging in his partner for a spinebuster and second rope elbow drop. Although Brown caught Hart's foot from an attempted kick, Hart floored him with an enzuigiri allowing the two to double-team Brown again. When Brown managed to tag in Henry he took out both Jarrett and Hart with clotheslines, whipping them into each other in the corner but they escaped when he tried to run into them himself. Brown then used the Sky High on Jarrett but Hart broke up the pin. Brown then went to the top rope but was distracted by Debra until Ivory pulled her away. Brown tried to separate the two leaving Henry to be double-teamed in the ring. His leg was hit with a guitar when the referee was distracted, Jarrett then applied a figure four leg lock and made him tap out.

Val Venis began the match by throwing Shamrock from corner to corner and chopping his chest. After he tried to pin Ken Shamrock, to a somewhat slow count from the special referee, Shamrock began to attack Venis, kicking him into the corner and shoulder barging him to the floor when he returned. Shamrock then threw Venis outside the ring, using the environment to attack him. After putting him back inside the ring Shamrock scoop slammed Venis but Venis would retaliate by stopping a suplex and reversing it into his own delayed suplex followed by an inverted atomic drop. Venis then picked him up and ran him into the ring post twice and returned to the ring to continue his assault on Shamrock's back. Despite frequent attempts by Shamrock to reverse the situation, Venis seldom let his assault continue for more than one or two strikes until Shamrock kicked him in the face and followed it up with a DDT. As Shamrock went for the pin, Gunn counted a slow two count then refused to finish the third, and as Shamrock complained, Venis put a sleeper hold on Shamrock. Venis then performed his trademark double running knee, finishing it with a Russian leg sweep. Gunn reprimanded Venis for his mounted punches, claiming they were closed fists so instead Venis went to the top rope but Shamrock caught him and tried to pin him with a hurricanrana pin. With Gunn's slow counting, Shamrock instead decided to apply an ankle lock but Venis made it to the rope break with the help of Ryan Shamrock. Shamrock shouted at his sister but she slapped him and when he returned to the ring Venis rolled him up and won the match with a quick pin count. After the match Gunn beat down a celebrating Venis, taunting him with crotch chops.

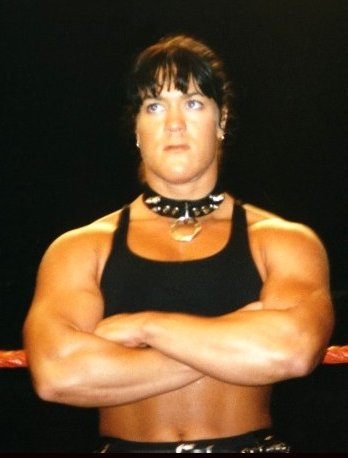
Chyna wrestled her real-life boyfriend, Triple H

The tag team match began with Triple H and Kane exchanging punches until Kane had a slight momentum causing Helmsley to tag in X-Pac who also suffered at the hands of Kane and was slammed from turnbuckle to turnbuckle until Chyna demanded to be tagged in, knocking X-Pac down with a forearm punch. Kane tagged himself in, much to the chagrin of Chyna and while she shouted at him for it, X-Pac found time to weaken him by kicking at his legs, Triple H illegally aiding him. He was soon tagged in but was floored by Kane's flying clothesline. Chyna tagged in and after keeping Helmsley down with some forearms, had her suplex reversed but as she was held in mid-air, she jumped out onto the floor and scoop-slammed him. Despite tagging X-Pac in, Triple H stayed in the ring to double suplex Kane, then rocket launching Chyna into him before using a double-team DDT on Kane. After some fighting around the ring, where guest commentator Shane McMahon was struck by X-Pac, the match resumed properly with Kane side slamming X-Pac and then allowing Chyna to perform a running power slam before tagging Kane back in to dominate X-Pac. The two frequently tagged, isolating X-Pac. When the tag came in, Triple H entered and threw Chyna to the floor before cornering Kane, then back body dropping him out of the ring with X-Pac following with a baseball slide. Kane soon recovered and took Triple H out of the ring and, with the referee knocked down and X-Pac giving a Bronco Buster to Chyna, Shane McMahon interfered and was chased away by X-Pac. Triple H fought with Chyna, trying to Pedigree her but Kane soon recovered and chokeslammed Triple H, pulling Chyna over him so that she pinned him when the referee recovered.

=== Main event matches ===
The Last Man Standing match began with the champion Mankind turning round and holding his hands together, mocking the previous pay-per-view where The Rock handcuffed him. The Rock utilized this to begin an assault on him but Mankind soon fought back, biting him in the corner. Mankind took it upon himself to move the match up the walkway, where Mankind was thrown into the stage set up. When Mankind recovered he DDTed The Rock through a television table and took him into a backstage area where he was thrown through some tables. The two fought back to the ring where Mankind scoop slammed The Rock and, after some cheering from the crowd, performed his version of the Corporate Elbow but The Rock sat up before the elbow drop and kicked the injured Mankind out of the ring. The Rock joined the commentary team and further insulted Mankind, allowing the champion to recuperate and dive over the table to hit The Rock. Mankind then went to the apron and delivered Cactus Elbow against the announce table. The Rock was pushed into the ring while Mankind brought the steel steps in but when he threw them at The Rock, he was able to escape and knock Mankind down, grabbing a chair from ringside and hitting Mankind's knee with it three times. He attempted a fourth shot but Mankind ducked and struck the ropes, the chair catapulting back into The Rock's face, and while he was dazed Mankind clotheslined the pair over the top rope. Mankind tried to set up a piledriver on the announce table but was back body dropped off the end of it and as he was recovering The Rock went back into the ring and threw the steel steps on him from inside the ring. Mankind staggered to his feet and entered the ring only to suffer a Corporate Elbow. While Mankind was being counted, The Rock grabbed a microphone and sang Heartbreak Hotel, substituting certain lyrics with his catchphrases, but Mankind pushed the mandible claw into The Rock and accidentally pushed referee Earl Hebner out of the ring. When he relinquished the mandible claw, Mankind brought Hebner back in the ring and grabbed his hand, controlling the count, but only made it to eight before The Rock stood up. Mankind used a double-arm DDT to land The Rock onto the chair but he stood up on the count of nine, prompting Mankind to stuff a smelly gym sock down The Rock's gullet. The Rock withstood the foul-smelling sock and reversed Mankind into a Rock Bottom, but Mankind still stood up and the two both grabbed for chairs and ran into each other delivering a double chair shot which neither could stand up from after a ten-count, ending the match in a draw. Since titles cannot change in a draw, Mankind remained the WWF Champion.

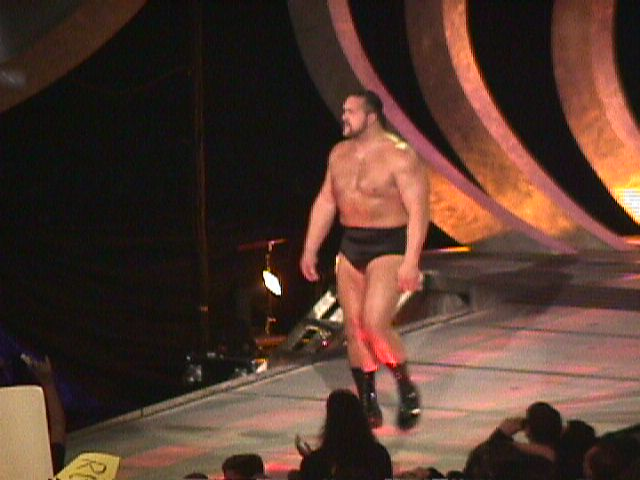
Paul Wight (later the Big Show) made his World Wrestling Federation debut at the event when he cut through the ring mat; Wight was formerly known as The Giant in World Championship Wrestling

The main event began with Vince McMahon not entering the steel cage, frustrating "Stone Cold" Steve Austin, who then left the cage to chase McMahon around until McMahon entered the ring and then closed the door locking Austin out. Austin then tried to climb in but McMahon punched him off the top causing him to land awkwardly. McMahon, thinking Austin was injured, exited the cage but was met with a clothesline from Austin who then wrapped his neck in cable and pushed him into the crowd, stomping a mudhole in him and then pouring a beer over him. McMahon tried to run through the crowd making it up the steps but Austin caught him and dragged him back to the ring, throwing him into the barricade and various bits of the cage. Austin mocked his opponent by sitting in a seat, allowing McMahon time to climb the outside of the cage. As he reached the top Austin met up with him and smashed his head against the cage, McMahon then bounced back and fell off the cage through the announce table. A gurney was brought out for McMahon who was unconscious by this point; Howard Finkel eventually announced that Austin was the winner via forfeit but Austin grabbed the microphone to stop the announcement, demanding that the match never officially started, and should commence seeing as McMahon was at least still breathing. Austin then left the cage and grabbed McMahon off the gurney, hitting him with it and then putting him inside the cage, officially starting the match. Austin furiously hit and kicked McMahon. As Austin was going to exit the cage by the door, then looked back to see McMahon giving him the finger. Austin then went back into the cage, stomping McMahon in the corner but McMahon lowblowed Austin and threw him into the cage before trying to escape. Austin caught McMahon's leg and caused McMahon's stomach to fall on the top of the cage and was then pulled back into the ring, allowing Austin to repeatedly throw him into the cage walls causing McMahon to bleed. Austin then climbed out of the ring and was almost on the floor outside but again McMahon gave him the finger, this time with both hands, and Austin climbed back in. After delivering a Stone Cold Stunner to him, Austin began to further taunt McMahon. Paul Wight, making his WWF debut, entered the ring by way of tearing a hole in the canvas and climbing through it. He proceeded to throw Austin into the cage several times. After checking on McMahon, he was instructed to throw Austin into the cage again. This time, Wight threw Austin into the cage with such force that the entire panel swung open and Austin was able to drop to the floor and gain the victory to earn a WWF Championship shot at WrestleMania XV causing McMahon's master plan to backfire.

== Reception ==
In 2017, Kevin Pantoja of 411Mania gave the event a rating of 2.5 [Very Bad], writing, "This was on the way to being one of the worst Pay-Per-Views I've ever seen. Starting with Goldust/Bluedust, Holly/Snow, and Mideon/Boss Man was an awful decision. The Tag Title and Intercontinental Title matches didn't turn things around. It [wasn't] until the final three matches that things became watchable. Mankind/Rock was MOTN but even that wasn't great. Austin/Vince and the DX tag were both decent. A lame show heading into what turned out to be a shitty WrestleMania".

== Aftermath ==
St. Valentine's Day Massacre: In Your House would be the final In Your House event as the company moved to install permanent names for each of its monthly PPVs, which began with Backlash in April. After 21 years in the promotion that was renamed to World Wrestling Entertainment (WWE) in 2002 (with "WWE" becoming an orphaned initialism in 2011), the In Your House branding returned for the promotion's NXT brand as a TakeOver event titled NXT TakeOver: In Your House in June 2020.

Ryan Shamrock would be dumped by Val Venis on Raw Is War, and would then be by the side of Billy Gunn, and later Goldust, whom she would accompany for his four-way match at WrestleMania XV for the Intercontinental title. Paul Wight would go by his real name until WrestleMania, when he would adopt his ring name, The Big Show, and would make his WrestleMania debut against Mankind.

== Results ==
No.	Results	Stipulations	Times
1^{D}	Too Much (Brian Christopher and Scott Taylor) defeated The Hardy Boyz (Jeff Hardy and Matt Hardy)	Tag team match	—
2^{H}	Viscera (with Mideon) defeated Test (with Big Boss Man) by disqualification	Singles match	2:20
3^{H}	Billy Gunn (with Triple H and X-Pac) vs. Tiger Ali Singh ended in a no contest	Singles match	0:40
4	Goldust defeated Bluedust by pinfall	Singles match	3:04
5	Bob Holly defeated Al Snow by pinfall	Hardcore match for the vacant WWF Hardcore Championship	9:58
6	Big Boss Man defeated Mideon by pinfall	Singles match	6:19
7	Jeff Jarrett and Owen Hart (c) (with Debra) defeated D'Lo Brown and Mark Henry (with Ivory) by submission	Tag team match for the WWF Tag Team Championship	9:34
8	Val Venis (with Ryan Shamrock) defeated Ken Shamrock (c) by pinfall	Singles match for the WWF Intercontinental Championship; Billy Gunn was the special guest referee.	15:53
9	The Corporation (Chyna and Kane) defeated D-Generation X (Triple H and X-Pac) by pinfall	Tag team match	14:46
10	Mankind (c) vs. The Rock ended in a draw	Last Man Standing match for the WWF Championship	22:00
11	"Stone Cold" Steve Austin defeated Mr. McMahon by escaping the cage	Steel Cage match to determine the #1 contender for the WWF Championship at WrestleMania XV	7:55
(c) / – the champion(s) heading into the match; D / – this was a dark match; H / – the match was broadcast prior to the pay-per-view on Sunday Night Heat
