= Royal Rumble (1999) =

World Wrestling Federation pay-per-view event

- Promotional poster featuring "Stone Cold" Steve Austin
- Promotion: World Wrestling Federation
- Date: January 24, 1999
- City: Anaheim, California
- Venue: Arrowhead Pond of Anaheim
- Attendance: 14,816
- Buy rate: 650,000
- Tagline: No Chance in Hell

Pay-per-view chronology
← Previous; Rock Bottom: In Your House	Next → St. Valentine's Day Massacre: In Your House

Royal Rumble chronology
← Previous; 1998	Next → 2000

The 1999 Royal Rumble, also promoted as Royal Rumble: No Chance in Hell, was a professional wrestling pay-per-view (PPV) event produced by the World Wrestling Federation (WWF, renamed WWE in 2002). It was the 12th annual Royal Rumble event and took place on January 24, 1999, at the Arrowhead Pond of Anaheim in Anaheim, California. The event was based around the men's Royal Rumble match, a modified 30-man battle royal in which the participants enter at timed intervals instead of all beginning in the ring at the same time and the winner received a WWF Championship match at WrestleMania XV.

The tagline and subtitle of the event was taken from a promise by WWF Chairman and Chief Executive Officer Mr. McMahon that the first entrant in the Royal Rumble match, "Stone Cold" Steve Austin, had "no chance in hell" of winning the match. The theme song for the event, based on the phrase, would go on to become the entrance music for McMahon's stable The Corporation and later, just McMahon himself, which he used until his resignation in January 2024.

The main event of the card was the 1999 Royal Rumble match. The event centered on the continuing heated rivalry between "Stone Cold" Steve Austin and Mr. McMahon, with both men entering the Royal Rumble match at #1 and #2, respectively. Mr. McMahon won the match by last eliminating Austin. The penultimate match was for the WWF Championship and was an "I Quit" match between Mankind and The Rock, which is remembered both for its brutality and its place in the documentary film Beyond the Mat; The Rock defeated Mankind to win the title. Lower down on the card, the WWF Intercontinental Championship and WWF Women's Championship were both defended.

== Production ==
=== Background ===
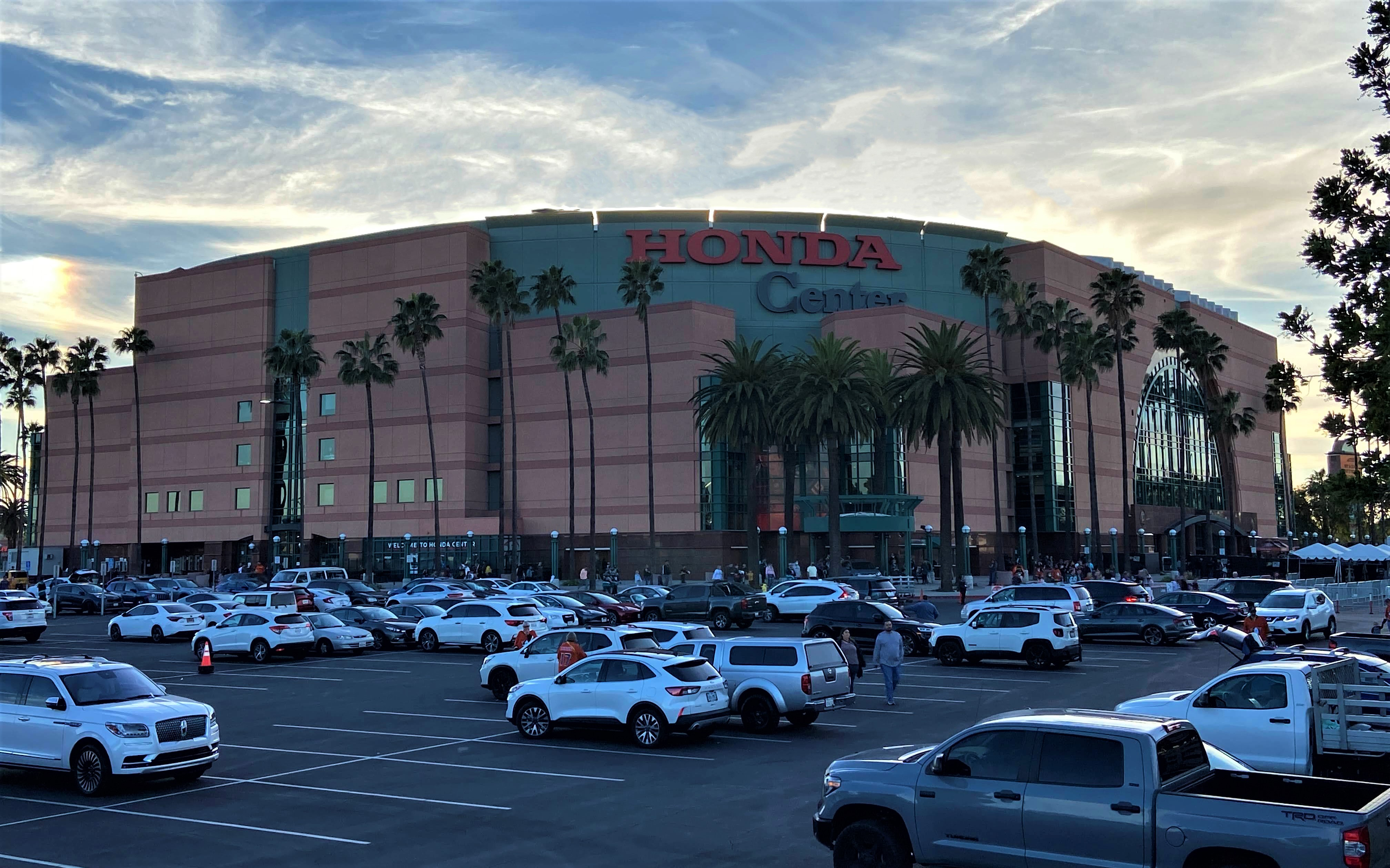
The 12th annual Royal Rumble event was held in Anaheim, California at the Arrowhead Pond of Anaheim (pictured as Honda Center, renamed in 2006).

The Royal Rumble is an annual professional wrestling event, produced every January by the World Wrestling Federation (WWF, renamed WWE in 2002) since 1988; that first event was a television special before it became an annual pay-per-view (PPV) beginning in 1989. It is one of the promotion's original four PPVs, along with WrestleMania, SummerSlam, and Survivor Series, referred to as the "Big Four", and was considered one of the "Big Five" PPVs with the addition of King of the Ring in 1993. It is named after and centered on the men's Royal Rumble match. The 12th Royal Rumble event was scheduled to be held on January 24, 1999, at the Arrowhead Pond of Anaheim in Anaheim, California.

The Royal Rumble match is a modified battle royal in which the participants enter at timed intervals instead of all beginning in the ring at the same time, and the match generally features 30 wrestlers. Since 1993, the winner earns a world championship match at that year's WrestleMania. For 1999, the winner earned a match for the WWF Championship at WrestleMania XV.

=== Storylines ===
The event comprised six matches that resulted from scripted storylines. Results were predetermined by the WWF's writers, while storylines were produced on WWF's weekly television show, Raw.

The overriding theme of the pay-per-view was centered on The Corporation and Mr. McMahon's attempts to enforce his notions of how a company should be run on the promotion. Since its inception the night after Survivor Series, the group had mainly come to blows with D-Generation X, the Undertaker's Ministry of Darkness and McMahon's nemesis "Stone Cold" Steve Austin.

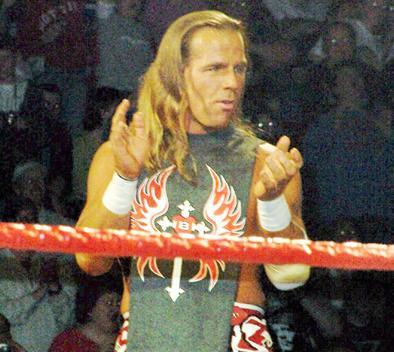
Shawn Michaels used his role as Commissioner to ruin Mr. McMahon's attempts to enter the Royal Rumble at #30 twice

When Commissioner Shawn Michaels allied himself with The Corporation, one of the first things he did was to book the WWF Tag Team Champions, Road Dogg and Billy Gunn, in a title defense against Corporate members Ken Shamrock and The Big Boss Man. Despite his interference at Rock Bottom: In Your House they managed to retain their titles but they were not so lucky on Raw is War on December 14. As the feud between DX and The Corporation intensified, the New Age Outlaws turned to singles wrestling as Road Dogg found himself caught up in the hardcore division and became Hardcore Champion on December 21. Meanwhile, as well as tensions from the tag team feuding, Billy Gunn gained the ire of Ken Shamrock when his sister Ryan appeared at ringside, only to have her sibling affection distracted when Gunn lived up to his nickname by flirtatiously mooning Ryan after Val Venis had already danced for her. Filled with his typical rage Shamrock put his Intercontinental Championship on the line for a chance to honor his notions of sibling protection.

After a minor absence, Women's Champion Sable returned to Raw with an open invitation on December 28, but before the match a fan came into the ring, later identified as Tori to give her a rose. A masked wrestler identified as "Spider Lady" came to the ring for the match (a nod to The Fabulous Moolah's screwjob over Wendi Richter in the mid '80s) but it ended in a no-contest when she started whipping Sable with her belt. The masked woman was revealed to be Luna Vachon, who would go on to face Sable in a "Strap Match" at the Rumble.

The Rock and Mankind had been feuding ever since Survivor Series in November 1998, when the two met in the finals of the "Deadly Game" tournament for the vacant WWF Championship. The Rock won the title that night with the help of the McMahons, who had previously been assisting Mankind, and became the chosen Corporate Champion while Mankind began a feud with the Corporation. Mankind faced The Rock again at Rock Bottom: IYH and won the match, but Mr. McMahon stepped in and announced that while Rock lost the match by falling unconscious to the mandible claw with Mankind’s smelly sock in his mouth, he did not technically submit and thus the WWF Championship would not change hands. Angered at being screwed out of the championship twice, Mankind attacked Shane McMahon on Raw is War and demanded a match. On the first Raw is War of 1999, January 4, after interference from The Corporation, D-Generation X and Steve Austin, Mankind won his first WWF Championship. Initially he refused The Rock's demands for a rematch, despite Rock offering stipulation after stipulation to appease Mankind until eventually he quit begging, at which point Mankind revealed that he would face The Rock at the Rumble as long as it was an "I Quit" match.

The Royal Rumble match featured a number of notable build ups. On Raw is War on January 11, a Corporation vs. DX mini-Rumble was set up with the winner taking the coveted number 30 spot; after all the apparent competitors had entered it seemed as if Triple H had won until Mr. McMahon made his way to the ring, entering himself on behalf of the Corporation and throwing a distracted Triple H out of the ring. Again it seemed as if the winner was established until DX's Chyna made her way to the ring and won the match. The event would mark the first time a female wrestler took part in the match. Chyna also appeared at the Royal Rumble the following year as well. Chyna became the only woman to enter the match until Beth Phoenix entered the Royal Rumble in 2010, Kharma in 2012, and Nia Jax in 2019.

The most notable aspect of the Royal Rumble, though, was the feud between Mr. McMahon and "Stone Cold" Steve Austin. Austin had won the Royal Rumble the previous two years and McMahon attempted to prevent him from repeating by putting him in a "Buried Alive" match at Rock Bottom: IYH against The Undertaker with one Royal Rumble place on the line. Austin won, with a little help from Kane and was guaranteed a place in the match, but McMahon continued in his attempts to prevent Austin from winning the match by "randomly" drawing Austin's spot at #1 and entering himself in the match at #30. Commissioner Michaels over-rode his decision and put McMahon at #2, and set up the aforementioned Corporate/DX mini-Rumble for the now vacant #30 position. With Austin and McMahon being the first two to enter, McMahon wanted to guarantee there would be "no chance in hell" that Austin would win by not only training as a competitor, but also offering a $100,000 bounty for the man who eliminated him.

=== Qualifying matches ===
- "Stone Cold" Steve Austin defeated The Undertaker in a Buried Alive match at Rock Bottom: In Your House
- Chyna won a Corporation vs. DX "Corporate Rumble" for the #30 spot on the January 11, 1999, episode of Raw Is War

Draw	Entrant	Faction	Order	Eliminated by	Time	Eliminations
1	Ken Shamrock	The Corporation	1	Himself	00:05	0
2	Billy Gunn	D-Generation X	2	Test	02:58	0
3	Big Boss Man	The Corporation	7	McMahon	08:08	1
4	Test	The Corporation	4	Kane	05:12	1
5	X-Pac	D-Generation X	6	Boss Man	04:10	0
6	Road Dogg	D-Generation X	3	Kane	01:51	0
7	Kane	The Corporation	5	Triple H	01:29	2
8	Triple H	D-Generation X	8	McMahon	02:58	1
9	Mr. McMahon	The Corporation	9	Chyna	01:42	2
10	Chyna	D-Generation X	-	Winner	00:04	1

Shamrock jumped the top rope to attack Billy Gunn as he made his entrance.

== Event ==
Other on-screen personnel
English commentators	Michael Cole
English commentators	Jerry Lawler
English commentators	Shane McMahon (Heat)
Spanish commentators	Carlos Cabrera
Spanish commentators	Hugo Savinovich
Interviewers	Dok Hendrix
Interviewers	Kevin Kelly (Also commentator on Heat)
Ring announcer	Howard Finkel
Referee	Mike Chioda
Referee	Earl Hebner
Referee	Jim Korderas
Referee	Theodore Long
Referee	Tim White

=== Preliminary matches ===
The opening match began slowly, with Boss Man taunting Road Dogg and being met with a crotch chop. The two circled each other, occasionally going in for a grapple but without achieving a move. Eventually Road Dogg became trapped in the corner and Boss Man punched him. Road Dogg found some short success when Boss Man tried to run and jump onto him, but was left with his crotch caught on the ropes. Boss Man tried to reply with his night stick but referee Mike Chioda stopped him and while he was being reprimanded, Road Dogg dragged him to his feet and pulled him into the ring post, legs open. After recovering, Boss Man threw Road Dogg outside of the ring. Inside the ring Boss Man took to hurling his opponent into the turnbuckles and then crushing him with a bear hug. Despite some punching back from Road Dogg, Boss Man dominated most of the match from this point and despite a Shake, Rattle & Roll from Road Dogg, Boss Man used his opponent's momentum to catch him in the Boss Man Slam, pinning him afterwards.

With Billy Gunn in the ring, Ken Shamrock ran into a series of kicks but managed to get to his feet and punch Gunn into the corner. He quickly worked on slowing down Gunn's style, keeping him mostly grounded with a series of kicks and elbow drops, only picking Gunn up to kick him back down. Both men went down after Shamrock Irish-whipped him and tried to flapjack Gunn, only to have his face driven into the mat with a FameAsser. Although Gunn put Shamrock in the corner for a ten punch, he then went to run into him and was thrown over the top rope out of the ring. Shamrock took advantage of the time outside of the ring to drag Gunn around, throwing him face first into the ring post, steel steps and the unpadded floor before putting him back in the ring. When the two were on the apron, Gunn managed to stun Shamrock by elbowing him and jumping into a bulldog onto the Spanish announce table. Taking some time to recuperate, Shamrock was undeterred, fighting as soon as he returned to the ring as he began to work on Gunn's ankle. Gunn fought back but accidentally clotheslined referee Tim White and while he was down, Val Venis ran in and delivered a DDT on Shamrock. By the time White was conscious to make a pin count, Shamrock kicked out. Gunn gained momentum and eventually went for a move from the turnbuckle. When he came down, Shamrock caught his ankle and took him to the ground, using his ankle lock to make Gunn submit.

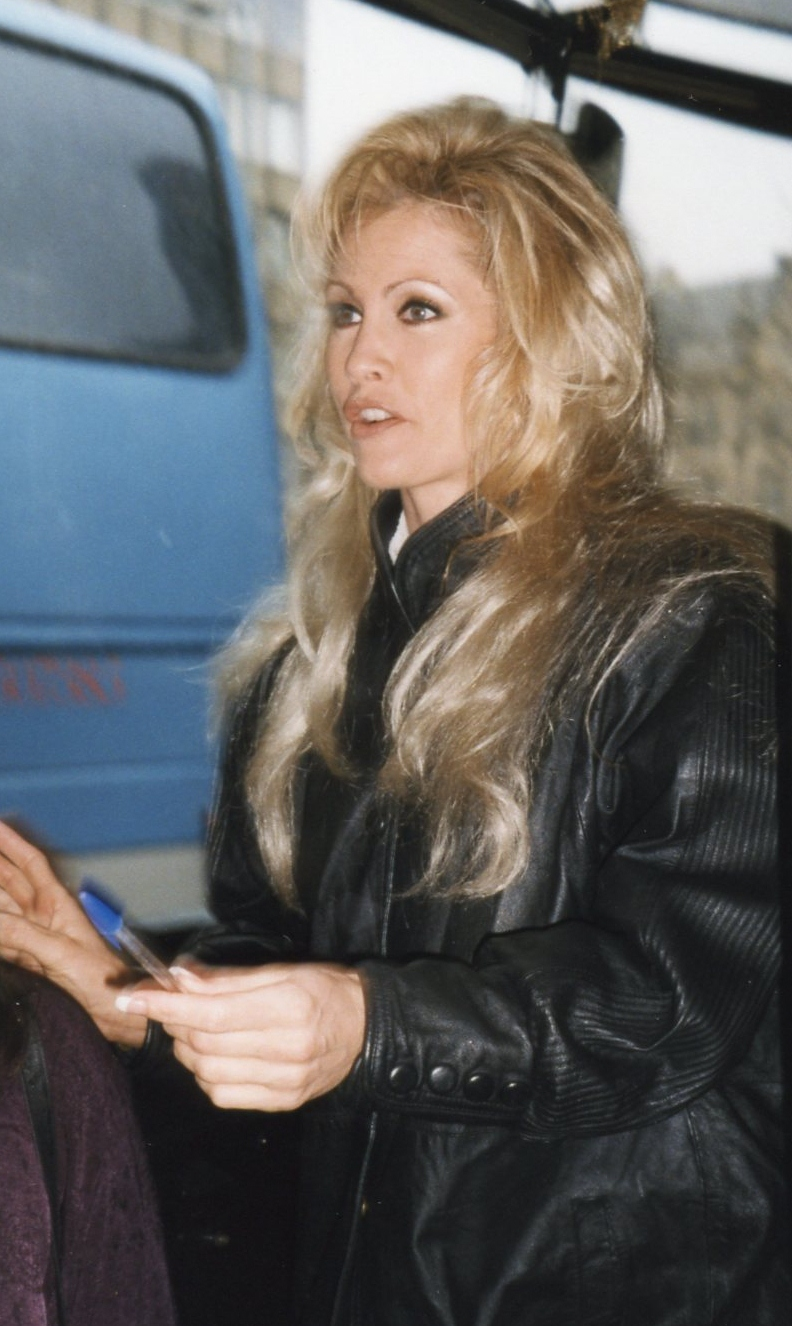
Sable fought Luna Vachon in a strap match

The European Championship match started with X-Pac running roughshod over Gangrel using a variety of spinning kicks. Gangrel's short advantage came from throwing X-Pac onto the ropes but X-Pac would not be kept down, trying a Bronco Buster. X-Pac tried to go to the top rope, fighting Gangrel from it, and then going for a flying crossbody. Some controversy arose when referee Teddy Long seemed to make the three count as Gangrel rolled the diving X-Pac into a roll-up pin, the champion kicking out too late. The match continued, though, despite chants from fans in attendance about the pin fall, but only for a short while as X-Pac jumped and drove a running Gangrel's head into the floor for the X-Factor and pinning him.

Despite Shane McMahon announcing Sable as unfit for contest, she came to the ring and demanded to fight, with McMahon joining the commentary team and giving a very biased account. After whipping Vachon with the strap, Sable was knocked to the ground allowing Vachon to tap two turnbuckles but Sable stopped her, using the strap again to whip her. After being kicked in the corner by Sable, Vachon side slammed Sable and then wrapped the strap around Sable's neck, hoisting Sable on her back. She then toured the turnbuckles, tapping three of them unaware that Sable was doing the same from her back. Just before she could tap the fourth, Vachon was taken off her feet by Sable. Fearing a turn in the match, Shane McMahon jumped on the apron to distract the referee, but as Vachon went to tap the fourth turnbuckle, Tori attacked her and ran back into the crowd, letting Sable freely tap the fourth turnbuckle in sight of the referee to retain the Women's Championship.

=== WWF Championship match ===
The "I Quit" Match began with Mankind clotheslining and punching The Rock into the turnbuckle before putting him on the ground and punching him, trying to make him quit early on with no success. When The Rock insulted Mankind over the microphone, Mankind struck him with the microphone and then Cactus clotheslined him out of the ring. After punching Rock against the barricade, he was thrown over the steel steps but managed to take control once again when The Rock joined the commentary team to further mock Mankind and was clotheslined over the table. After hitting him again with the microphone when he would not quit, The Rock was thrown inside the ring again, where Mankind stuffed a smelly sock down The Rock's throat to the point where The Rock could not talk to quit, as The Rock had passed out from the mandible claw. Mankind then took The Rock out of the ring and through the crowd but when he tried to clothesline The Rock, The Rock slammed him back into the ringside barricade. The Rock then took the bell to Mankind's head, ringing it next to his ear (and humorously singing "bells will be ringing" into the microphone) before trying to Rock Bottom him through the Spanish announce table, but the table gave way before the move could be performed.

Mankind ran for recovery up the walkway but was chased by The Rock who lost control when his opponent began head-butting him. The Rock thumbed Mankind's eye and took him through the technical area, smashing his head into the food there and then performing a DDT on him on the concrete, at which point Mankind refused to quit. The Rock then brought a ladder into the match but was knocked down with the ladder on top of him, he escaped just as Mankind delivered a running elbow drop onto the ladder, though he would still not quit. The Rock then set the ladder up and climbed to the first tier of crowd, fighting in front of them with Mankind just about to throw him off. The Rock low blowed him though, and then climbed over the barrier up the stairs to make a running punch which launched Mankind onto the electrical hub of the arena, causing them to spark and the lights to go out briefly. Shane McMahon came to stop the match but The Rock demanded his opponent quit, though he would not ask him the question as he kicked a crawling Mankind back towards the ring. With Mankind lying unconscious in the ring, The Rock handcuffed his hands behind his back and hit his head into the turnbuckle. Mankind kicked The Rock low, then dropped a knee into his crotch and asked him if he quit. The Rock managed to stand up and clotheslined Mankind to the mat, putting a chair on his face and performing the Corporate Elbow. When he was asked if he would quit, Mankind told The Rock to go to hell, The Rock told him he'd go to hell first. Mankind stood up only to be met with three hard steel chair shots but still refused to quit, saying he'd have to be killed first. The Rock then chased Mankind out of the ring and up the walkway, hitting him repeatedly with a chair until he fell unconscious on the concrete. Finally, Mankind was heard shouting "I quit!" three times in a row; the audio was actually a recording from a promo Mankind made on Heat in the match build up, so Mankind never actually quit, but The Rock was declared the winner nonetheless. Backstage footage of before and after this match can be seen on the pro wrestling documentary Beyond the Mat.

=== Royal Rumble match ===
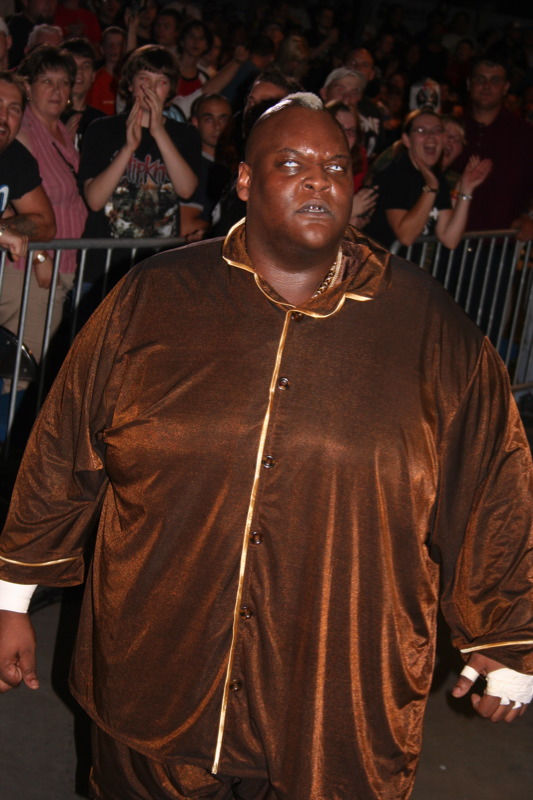
Mabel was kidnapped by The Ministry of Darkness in the Royal Rumble match

The Royal Rumble match began with Stone Cold Steve Austin and Vince McMahon circling each other. McMahon mistimed a clothesline and Austin punched him into the corner, stomping a mudhole. Austin then went to throw McMahon over the top rope but stopped, wanting to take his time as Golga came to the ring. With Austin distracted by Golga, McMahon fled under the bottom rope (and thus wasn't eliminated) but Austin soon followed when Golga was eliminated. Austin followed McMahon through the crowd and eventually fought their way to the halls of the arena and was led into the public toilets where The Corporation were waiting to beat Austin down and leave him unconscious on the floor. In the ring Droz had come out and waited the allotted time until Edge made his appearance, the two fighting only to quickly eliminate Gillberg as soon as he entered the ring. When Dan Severn entered the ring he immediately gunned for the also freshman Steve Blackman, the two fighting in the corner until Tiger Ali Singh came in and attacked Blackman. Meanwhile, clips were shown of Austin being lifted onto a gurney and eventually being taken to hospital. Shortly after, The Blue Meanie entered the match and went after Singh, before being cornered by Droz. When the eleventh man was scheduled to enter, nobody showed and backstage Mabel was shown throwing Headbanger Mosh into a wall before entering the Rumble himself in Mosh's place. Shortly after entering the match, Mabel took out Blackman, Severn, Singh, Meanie and Droz, and started a clash with Road Dogg, who was just fresh and took Edge out, having the upper hand. But after having some dominance, the lights went out, and when they came back up, under a blue hue, The Acolytes and Mideon had eliminated Mabel and took him to meet The Undertaker who put him in a (kayfabe) trance. None of them were competitors. Road Dogg was left on his own and quickly eliminated Gangrel but had more difficulty with Kurrgan. Al Snow tried to help Road Dogg but when he over zealously climbed the ropes to push Kurrgan out, Road Dogg jumped on the opportunity to push him over. The ring gradually began to fill up again with Goldust and Godfather until Kane entered, instantly putting all four wrestlers over the top rope and then eliminating himself when some asylum workers came to try and commit him.

Mr. McMahon briefly returned into the ring but then exited to give the ring to Ken Shamrock, opting to join the commentary team instead. The next entrant was Billy Gunn, with only one shoe due to his ankle being injured from their earlier match up. As Test entered the ring, the Ministry were shown in the parking lot putting Mabel into a hearse and then an ambulance pulled up with Steve Austin driving. He quickly made his way to the ring, overshadowing the entrance of the Big Boss Man. McMahon ran around the ring away from Austin, running through it to allow Shamrock to secure him before fleeing again to the commentary team. Austin eliminated Shamrock with little trouble but put more effort into Boss Man, choking him with a turnbuckle tie. Again the ring began to fill up, with two members of DX in Triple H and X-Pac, Test and Boss Man representing The Corporation along with other singles wrestlers in Val Venis, Mark Henry, Jeff Jarrett, D'Lo Brown and Owen Hart. Austin took a break from being in the ring to go to the commentary team to throw a jug of water in McMahon's face before returning to the fight. At this point the first woman to enter a Royal Rumble, Chyna came to the ring. She instantly targeted Mark Henry, delivering forearms before throwing him over the top rope, but before she had time to celebrate Austin immediately clotheslined her over the top rope, for which Triple H attacked him, and in addition, the latter took both Val and Jarrett out. Triple H was soon eliminated by Austin as the numbers started to dwindle after Austin threw D'Lo and Owen over, and after giving a Stone Cold Stunner to Boss Man, Austin eliminated him leaving only him and McMahon. Austin went to the announce table and attacked McMahon, throwing him into the crowd and then back to ringside, hitting him with a chair. Austin then threw McMahon into the ring, standing over him as McMahon clambered to his feet and lowblowed Austin. The two both staggered to their feet when Austin stunnered McMahon. The Rock then came to ringside taunting Austin with the WWF Championship, climbing up to the apron. As Austin ran to punch The Rock, McMahon climbed to his feet and came up behind Austin, throwing him over the top rope and winning the 1999 Royal Rumble match.

== Reception ==
The event has received mixed to positive reviews from critics.

In 2010, Jack Bramma of 411Mania gave the event a rating of 6.5 [Average], stating, "Hard to accurately judge. The undercard is mediocre. Rock-Foley [is] awesome, but as usual the show lives or dies with the Rumble match. The '99 Rumble match is definitely acquired taste, and if you weren’t a fan of the period, you will probably think it sucks. It's dated as hell and is a microcosm of the Attitude Era, but I loved the Rumble match itself warts and all and that's mostly what the rating is for (the Rumble and Rock-Foley). Your mileage will totally vary".

In 2022, John Canton of TJR Wrestling gave the event a rating of 5/10, stating, "This was similar to the year before where they had a poor undercard, and just a decent (or some might say poor) Royal Rumble match, but at least the WWF Title match was very memorable. The first hour of this show is awful. I think the story of the Rumble match makes it tolerable to watch, but I hated the structure of the match with the two main guys McMahon and Austin out of the ring for most of it. The big selling point was Austin being able to get his hands on Vince and we got plenty of that. I’ll never forget this Rock/Mankind match. I just wish it was unforgettable for better reasons. I know the next two years of Rumble PPVs were a lot better, so that’s something to look forward to.

In 2022, Paul Matthews of Classic Wrestling Review gave the event a rating of "a mild thumbs up," stating, "This is a one-match show. Rock vs. Mankind is great, but it is uncomfortable to see. With that said, this event still contained great storyline advancement. Nothing on it was terrible, so it’s not a bad watch. I still give the PPV a mild thumbs up."

== Aftermath ==
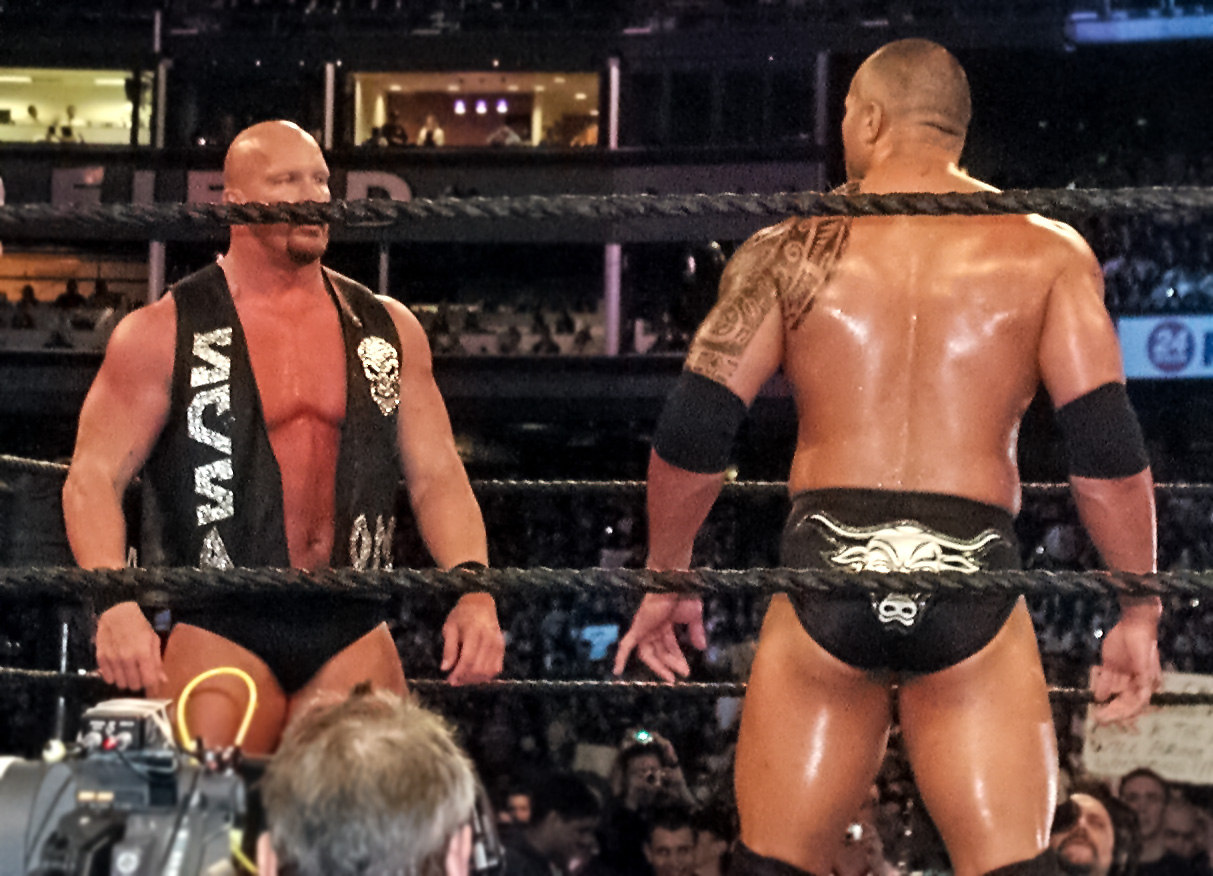
The Rock would meet "Stone Cold" Steve Austin at WrestleMania XV for the first of three WrestleMania matches between the two over the next five years

On Raw Is War the following night, Mr. McMahon awarded The Rock the $100,000 bounty for helping him eliminate Austin in the Royal Rumble, and also announced that he was officially forfeiting his title shot at WrestleMania, the first time ever a Royal Rumble winner had done so, so as to not make The Rock defend his WWF Championship against McMahon. While McMahon planned to choose who The Rock would face at WrestleMania, he was interrupted by WWF Commissioner Shawn Michaels, who informed McMahon that since he forfeited his title shot at WrestleMania, according to WWF rules, the title shot was then immediately given to the Royal Rumble runner-up, Steve Austin, much to McMahon's fury. Austin took advantage by convincing McMahon to a match. Austin explained that even more than a WWF Championship match, he wanted another chance to fight McMahon without any legal ramifications so much that he would risk his WrestleMania title shot for the chance. To ensure that there would be no corporate interference, the match would take place inside a steel cage at St. Valentine's Day Massacre: In Your House. Austin went on to win the match after the debut of Paul Wight, who came through the ring's mat and threw Austin into the cage wall, breaking it open and causing Austin to exit the cage before McMahon. Austin proceeded to face The Rock at WrestleMania XV, winning the WWF Championship for the second year in a row.

The mystery of Mankind's quitting was solved when it was revealed that Shane McMahon had played a voice clip from a prerecorded interview on Sunday Night Heat of Mankind vowing to make Rock be the one screaming, "I quit, I quit, I quit!" when he was actually unconscious. Having been screwed again, Mankind hijacked the $100,000 bounty money The Rock earned for helping eliminate Austin, and began to throw it in the crowd, holding it ransom for a rematch. The rematch would be a twenty-minute time limit hardcore match, held in an empty arena during halftime of Super Bowl XXXIII on Halftime Heat, where Mankind would win the title back by trapping Rock underneath a heavy payload on a forklift truck. With the Rock claiming it was an unfair win, the two faced each other again, and in hopes of finding a definitive champion the match was booked as a "Last Man Standing" match at St. Valentine's Day Massacre. It ended in a draw when both men were counted out, meaning they had to settle it again the next night on Raw is War in a ladder match which Rock won with help from Paul Wight. With WrestleMania so close, Mankind sought to settle the score with Rock by countlessly trying to become a second special guest referee in the WrestleMania main event, alongside Wight. Early in the WrestleMania card, Wight and Mankind fought for the referee position in a match which saw Wight disqualified for chokeslamming Mankind through a pair of steel folding chairs. Mankind was sent to the hospital for his injuries, but returned to officiate in the closing minutes of the match.

After making herself properly known, Sable's stalker Tori would be humiliated with her, pretending to align herself with Luna Vachon only to help Sable give her a beat down. Tori soon realized how selfish Sable was, though and the two had a match for the Women's Championship at WrestleMania XV where Sable retained her title thanks to interference from Nicole Bass.

Mabel, meanwhile, was renamed Viscera and became the newest member of the Ministry of Darkness as it assembled its war against The Corporation and Mr. McMahon, making The Brood part of the stable too on February 1. The Undertaker would have a "Hell in a Cell" match against Big Boss Man at WrestleMania XV which ended with The Brood passing rope from the roof to hang Boss Man with. The feud between the two stables continued until they joined forces when it became apparent that the "higher power" The Undertaker was answering to was actually Mr. McMahon.

One day after her historic appearance in the Royal Rumble Match, Chyna turned heel by betraying Triple H and becoming the newest member of The Corporation. At St. Valentine's Day Massacre, the evil Chyna teamed with fellow Corporation member Kane in defeating Triple H and X-Pac. Chyna turned against Kane and reunited with Triple H at WrestleMania XV, but they would both help Shane McMahon defeat X-Pac later in the event, making Triple H a member of The Corporation.

== Results ==
No.	Results	Stipulations	Times
1^{D}	Christian defeated Jeff Hardy	Singles match	11:00
2^{H}	The J.O.B. Squad (Bob Holly and Scorpio) defeated Too Much (Brian Christopher and Scott Taylor)	Tag team match	3:52
3^{H}	Mankind defeated Mabel by disqualification	Singles match	5:04
4	Big Boss Man defeated Road Dogg	Singles match	11:52
5	Ken Shamrock (c) defeated Billy Gunn by submission	Singles match for the WWF Intercontinental Championship	14:23
6	X-Pac (c) defeated Gangrel	Singles match for the WWF European Championship	5:53
7	Sable (c) defeated Luna Vachon (with Shane McMahon)	Strap match for the WWF Women's Championship	4:43
8	The Rock defeated Mankind (c) by making Mankind say "I quit"	"I Quit" match for the WWF Championship	21:47
9	Mr. McMahon won by last eliminating "Stone Cold" Steve Austin	30-man Royal Rumble match for a WWF Championship match at WrestleMania XV	56:38
(c) / – the champion(s) heading into the match; D / – this was a dark match; H / – the match was broadcast prior to the pay-per-view on Sunday Night Heat

=== Royal Rumble entrances and eliminations ===
A new entrant came out approximately every 90 seconds.

– Winner

Draw	Entrant	Order eliminated	Eliminated by	Time	Eliminations
1	"Stone Cold" Steve Austin	29	Mr. McMahon	56:38	8
2	Mr. McMahon	-	Winner	56:38	1
3	Golga	1	"Stone Cold" Steve Austin	00:15	0
4	Droz	7	Mabel	12:30	0
5	Edge	8	Road Dogg	11:51	1
6	Gillberg	2	Edge	00:06	0
7	Steve Blackman	4	Mabel	07:22	0
8	Dan Severn	3	Mabel	05:43	0
9	Tiger Ali Singh	5	Mabel	04:02	0
10	The Blue Meanie	6	Mabel	02:59	0
11	Mabel	9	Bradshaw, Faarooq, and Mideon	01:26	5
12	Road Dogg	12	Kane	10:41	3
13	Gangrel	10	Road Dogg	00:26	0
14	Kurrgan	13	Kane	06:54	0
15	Al Snow	11	Road Dogg	00:47	0
16	Goldust	15	Kane	04:02	0
17	The Godfather	14	Kane	01:40	0
18	Kane	16	Himself	00:53	4
19	Ken Shamrock	17	"Stone Cold" Steve Austin	04:50	0
20	Billy Gunn	18	"Stone Cold" Steve Austin	07:05	0
21	Test	19	"Stone Cold" Steve Austin	12:48	0
22	Big Boss Man	28	"Stone Cold" Steve Austin	18:53	2
23	Triple H	25	"Stone Cold" Steve Austin	14:21	2
24	Val Venis	24	Triple H	12:41	0
25	X-Pac	20	Big Boss Man	05:44	0
26	Mark Henry	22	Chyna	07:57	0
27	Jeff Jarrett	21	Triple H	03:39	0
28	D'Lo Brown	27	Big Boss Man	09:11	0
29	Owen Hart	26	"Stone Cold" Steve Austin	06:31	0
30	Chyna	23	"Stone Cold" Steve Austin	00:35	1

No. 11 was originally drawn by Headbanger Mosh, who was attacked and replaced by Mabel on his way to the ring. Mideon, Faarooq, and Bradshaw (themselves not official entrants) eliminated Mabel and would indoctrinate him into the Ministry of Darkness as "Viscera" on the following Raw.
