= Corporate Ministry =

Professional wrestling stable

Stable
- Name: Corporate Ministry
- Leader(s): The Undertaker; Shane McMahon; Mr. McMahon
- Members: Faarooq; Bradshaw; Mideon; Viscera; Triple H Chyna; Big Boss Man; Rodney; Pete Gas; Joey Abs; Paul Bearer
- Debut: April 29, 1999
- Disbanded: August 2, 1999
- Years active: 1999

The Corporate Ministry was a villainous stable in the World Wrestling Federation (WWF, now WWE) in late spring and summer of 1999 during the Attitude Era.

It was formed after a merger between The Corporation and the Ministry of Darkness factions, who united while facing common adversaries Stone Cold Steve Austin, The Rock, The Union, and Mr. McMahon. In an infamous swerve, the latter was revealed as the power behind the Corporate Ministry, who intended it to destroy Austin.

== History ==
=== Background ===
Throughout early 1999, The Undertaker and his Ministry of Darkness had been feuding with WWF owner Mr. McMahon, trying to gain control of the Federation. To break Vince's spirits they began targeting his daughter Stephanie. Worried about his daughter, Vince shifted focus from his Corporation stable to Stephanie. With Vince occupied, his son Shane gradually took over the leadership of the Corporation. On April 12, Shane kicked Vince, Pat Patterson, and Gerald Brisco out of the Corporation. His rationale was that there was no room in the Corporation for the old and that Vince no longer had his priorities straight. Shane then slapped his father, saying that the strong, ruthless man he knew was gone.

Heading into WrestleMania XV, Vince McMahon had been feuding with Stone Cold Steve Austin for an entire year. By this point, the Corporation was involved in the feud as well. The Rock, Vince's handpicked champion, lost his WWF Championship to Austin at WrestleMania XV and also lost a rematch at Backlash. The Rock blamed the loss on Shane, who had been guest referee and accidentally hit The Rock with the championship belt near the end of the match. The following night on Raw Is War, The Rock insulted Shane and hit him with a Rock Bottom and was in turn fired from the Corporation.

At Backlash, the Ministry kidnapped Stephanie. The Undertaker attempted to wed and sacrifice her the following night, but was ruined successfully by Stone Cold Steve Austin after two failed attempts by Ken Shamrock and the Big Show. Members of The Corporation had wanted to help Stephanie, but Shane held them back apparently trying to convince them that it could be a Ministry trap.

=== Formation ===
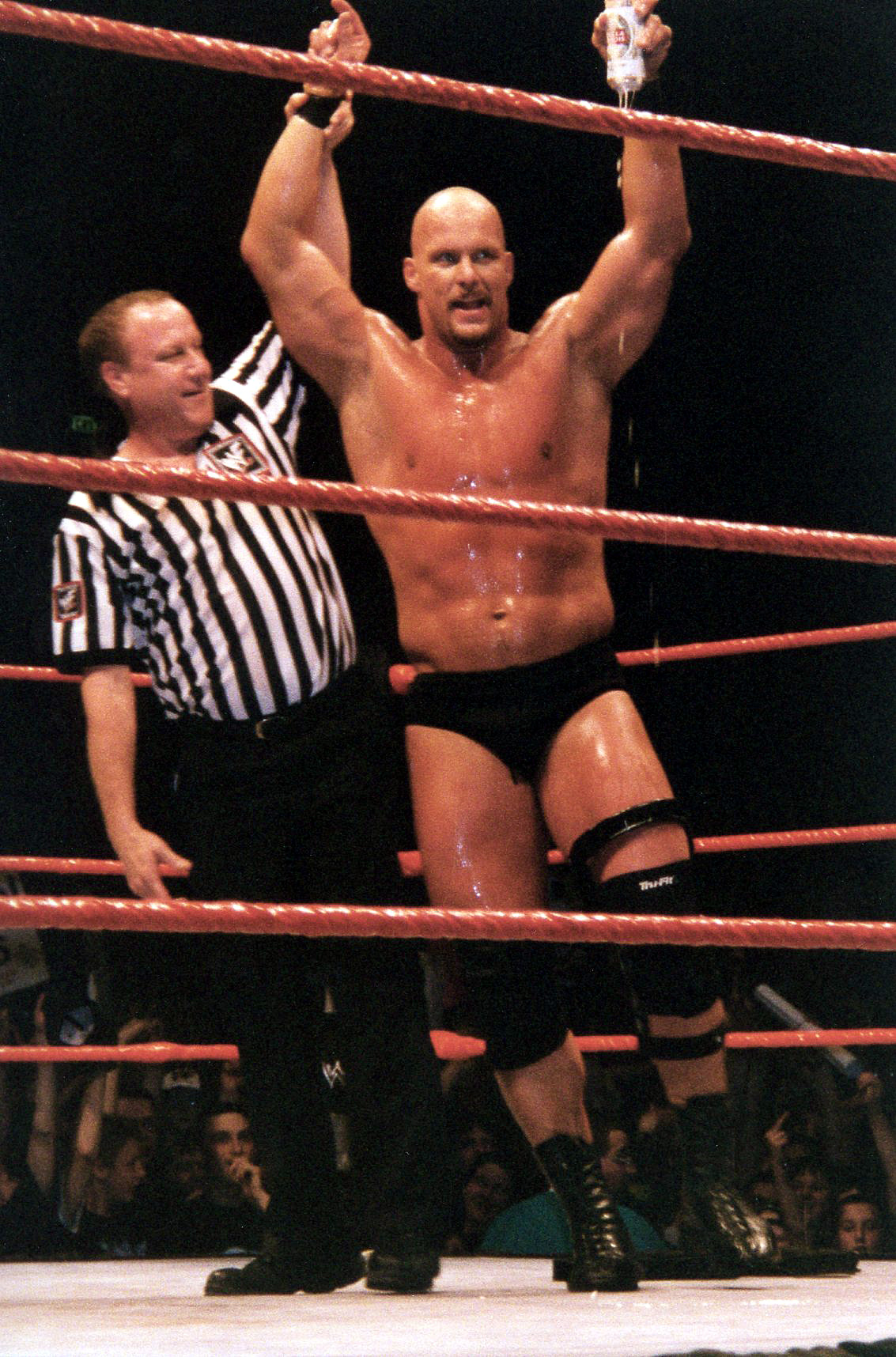
Stone Cold Steve Austin was the main target of this stable

On April 29, the pilot episode of SmackDown!, The Undertaker merged his Ministry of Darkness with Shane's Corporation to form the Corporate Ministry. The two groups united in order to fight their common foes Stone Cold Steve Austin, The Rock, and Mr. McMahon. The members of both factions seemingly forgot their past conflicts and worked together as a massive stable.

On the following episode of Raw Is War, a new faction formed to oppose the Corporate Ministry. Former Corporation members Ken Shamrock, Big Show, and Test joined together with Mankind to form The Union. The Union members felt that they were being screwed over by the Corporation ever since Shane had taken control of it from his father. Wanting revenge on his son, Vince soon united with the Union as they fought with the Corporate Ministry.

=== Incorporation ===
As the Corporate Ministry's first act, Shane ordered a WWF Championship match at Over the Edge between Austin and The Undertaker with himself as a special guest referee. WWF Commissioner Shawn Michaels countered by adding Vince as another guest referee. That night, an altercation between the feuding McMahons collected The Undertaker and Austin, and Shane fast-counted the pin to give the match and the title to The Undertaker. That same night, The Rock defeated Triple H via disqualification and The Union defeated The Acolytes, Viscera, and Big Bossman in an elimination match. A week later, The Acolytes defeated X-Pac and Kane to win the WWF Tag Team Championship.

Meanwhile, The Undertaker's claim that he served a higher power was expanded upon. Eventually, The Undertaker decided to offer Austin to this greater power, who revealed his identity to Austin while dressed in a black robe and a hood that hid his face from the audience. On June 7, the identity of the higher power was revealed as Vince McMahon, and the entire exercise had been a ruse designed to allow the McMahons to get revenge on Austin. After the unveiling, Linda and Stephanie McMahon, who were also victims of the ruse, used their combined 50% share in the WWF to punish Vince. Linda stepped down as CEO of the company, naming Austin as her replacement. Further, she and Stephanie were signing over their shares of the WWF to Austin. The Undertaker has stated that he considers the Corporate Ministry stable to be the low point of his "dark" era due to the diluting of power from himself to the McMahons.

The McMahons challenged Austin to a winner-take-all handicap match at the King of the Ring. The match became a ladder match after Big Boss Man lost a match to Austin, allowing Austin to pick the stipulation. To punish him for the loss, Big Boss Man was fired from the Corporate Ministry.

With Austin now feuding with the McMahons, The Undertaker faced a new challenger, The Rock. After The Rock beat The Undertaker and Triple H in a handicap match, The Undertaker faced The Rock at King of the Ring for the title. The Undertaker won the match, thanks to a run-in by Triple H. That same night, Vince and Shane defeated Austin in a ladder match to win his 50% share of the company and regain full control of the WWF. The following week, the Acolytes lost the tag championship to the Hardy Boyz. Big Boss Man rejoined the Corporate Ministry the night after King of the Ring.

After King of the Ring, Austin reinserted himself into a feud with The Undertaker by announcing that, while still CEO, he booked himself a title rematch with The Undertaker, with the time and place to be determined by Austin. On the Raw Is War after King of the Ring, Austin defeated The Undertaker to regain the WWF Championship.

At Fully Loaded, a First Blood match was signed with two stipulations. If The Undertaker regained the title, Austin could never challenge for it again. If Austin retained, Vince McMahon would be forced to leave the WWF. Austin won by hitting The Undertaker with a television camera after an assist from X-Pac, thus retaining the title and forcing Vince out of the company. Meanwhile, The Acolytes defeated The Hardy Boyz and their manager Michael Hayes to regain the belts, and Triple H defeated The Rock in a leather strap match to become the number one contender for the WWF Championship. and Big Bossman won the hardcore title from Al Snow. Two weeks later, the Acolytes lost the belts to X-Pac and Kane.

=== Dissolution ===
By the end of July, The Undertaker's relationship with the McMahons had dissolved and the Corporate Ministry was effectively disbanded by Shane McMahon on August 2, 1999. Shane continued to align himself with Triple H and Chyna, and on the Raw Is War following SummerSlam he helped Triple H defeat Mankind to win his first WWF Championship. The Acolytes stayed together and continued to wrestle under that name with no connection to anyone, eventually becoming the APA. Big Bossman continued his feud with Al Snow.

The Undertaker, in the meantime, formed a new tag team with Big Show called the "Unholy Alliance", which eventually grew into a loose stable that included former Ministry members Mideon and Viscera. They defeated X-Pac and Kane at SummerSlam for the WWF Tag Team Championship, only to lose them a week later to the makeshift tag team of Mankind and The Rock, which became better known as the Rock 'n' Sock Connection. The following week, they regained the tag team championship in a Buried Alive match after Triple H buried Mankind following an attack on Big Show.

Shortly after this, the Undertaker learned his torn groin would require surgery, which necessitated a change in storyline. The team's scheduled defense against the former champions on Raw Is War two weeks later was turned into a Dark Side Rules match where any of the members of the Unholy Alliance could wrestle. This enabled Undertaker to avoid aggravating his injury, although the group lost the tag team title back to the Rock 'n' Sock Connection.

Afterward, Austin told McMahon on RAW that according to the previous contract's "fine print" he could reinstate him, provided that McMahon granted him his title shot. McMahon agreed and considered himself reinstated, granting Austin the title shot - with the catch that he would wait to meet the winner of the Six-Pack Challenge WWF Title match at Unforgiven. During that time, The Undertaker was set to compete in the same Six-Pack Challenge against The Rock, Mankind, Kane, Big Show, and Triple H, requiring a change in those plans as well. One week after the group lost the tag team title for the final time, Mr. McMahon forced Triple H to take part in a gauntlet match to keep his spot in the Unforgiven main event, with each match being considered the "specialty" match of the competitors. Undertaker was originally set to face Triple H in a casket match as part of the gauntlet, but Undertaker refused to compete and walked out on Mr. McMahon. Mideon and Viscera, who earlier had interfered in Triple H's inferno match against Kane, were forced to take Undertaker's place and won the match after Triple H was unable to put both men in a casket.

After that, the remaining members of what was left of the Ministry went their separate ways. Big Show became the WWF Champion at that year's Survivor Series, while Viscera won the WWF Hardcore Championship and was eventually let go from the company. Mideon disappeared for some time after Unforgiven, returning first as an impostor version of Mankind and then as "Naked Mideon" before leaving the company himself. Joey Abs made his debut by joining The Mean Street Posse; he wasn't a member of the Corporate Ministry, but debuted under the Corporate Ministry banner.

== Championships and accomplishments ==
- Pro Wrestling Illustrated
  - Feud of the Year (1999) – Mr. McMahon vs. Stone Cold Steve Austin
  - Rookie of the Year (1999) – Shane McMahon
- World Wrestling Federation
  - WWF Championship (1 time) – The Undertaker
  - WWF European Championship (2 times) – Shane McMahon (1), Mideon (1)
  - WWF Hardcore Championship (1 time) – Big Boss Man
  - WWF Tag Team Championship (2 times) – The Acolytes (2)
- Wrestling Observer Newsletter
  - Best Booker (1999) – Mr. McMahon
  - Best Non-Wrestler (1999) – Mr. McMahon
  - Feud of the Year (1999) – Mr. McMahon vs. Stone Cold Steve Austin

== Members ==
C	Member from The Corporation
D	Member from The Ministry of Darkness
M	Manager

Member	Group	Joined	Left
Shane McMahon (Co-leader)	C	April 29, 1999	August 2, 1999
The Undertaker (Co-leader)	D	April 29, 1999	July 26, 1999
Paul Bearer (M)	D	April 29, 1999	July 26, 1999
Big Boss Man (Note: Boss Man was temporarily "fired" from the stable from June 21, 1999 to June 28, 1999.)	C	April 29, 1999	August 2, 1999
Bradshaw	D	April 29, 1999	August 2, 1999
Chyna	C	April 29, 1999	August 2, 1999
Faarooq	D	April 29, 1999	August 2, 1999
Triple H	C	April 29, 1999	August 2, 1999
Mideon	D	April 29, 1999	August 2, 1999
Pete Gas	C	April 29, 1999	August 2, 1999
Rodney	C	April 29, 1999	August 2, 1999
Viscera	D	April 29, 1999	August 2, 1999
Mr. McMahon (Co-leader) (Note: On April 12, 1999, Vince McMahon left The Corporation before the merger with The Ministry, he would rejoin when he revealed himself as the "Higher Power".)	C	June 7, 1999	July 25, 1999
Joey Abs (Note: Abs never officially joined the Corporate Ministry but joined sub-group The Mean Street Posse during their association with the Corporate Ministry.)	-	June 21, 1999	August 2, 1999

== Sub-groups ==
Affiliate	Members	Type
The Acolytes	Bradshaw; Faarooq	Tag team
Mean Street Posse	Pete Gas; Joey Abs; Rodney	Tag team Trio

== See also ==
- The Authority
- The Corporation
- Ministry of Darkness
