= J.O.B. Squad =

Professional wrestling stable

Stable
- Members: Al Snow; The Blue Meanie; Bob Holly; Duane Gill/Gillberg; Scorpio
- Debut: November 1998
- Years active: 1998–1999

The J.O.B. Squad was a professional wrestling stable in the World Wrestling Federation (WWF) in the late 1990s.

The theme of the group was that each member was a perennial enhancement talent (otherwise known as jobbers), in which they lost to established or up-and-coming wrestlers.

The acronym J.O.B. was said to stand for "Just Over Broke", a reference to wrestlers' penchant for appearing in preliminary matches and, therefore, being on the low end of the pay scale.

The J.O.B. Squad wore shirts resembling nWo shirts as a parody of the many nWo factions and offshoots in World Championship Wrestling (WCW). Road Dogg was first seen wearing the shirt and made reference to "the squad" on the March 30, 1998 episode of Raw Is War, the night after WrestleMania XIV and the same night that he, Billy Gunn and X-Pac joined D-Generation X.

== History ==
In November 1998, Al Snow, Bob Holly and Scorpio united and formed the J.O.B. Squad. Soon after their formation, Holly and Scorpio defeated Too Much in the Squad's first match on the November 8 episode of Sunday Night Heat. On the November 23 episode of Raw Is War, The J.O.B. Squad helped Mankind defeat Ken Shamrock and Big Boss Man in a triple threat match. After helping Mankind, The J.O.B. Squad gained a new member in Duane Gill, who then scored an upset over Christian by winning the Light Heavyweight Championship. The Squad would score another upset later on in the night as they defeated The New Age Outlaws after interference from Shamrock, Boss Man, Mankind and other J.O.B. Squad members. Gill was later renamed Gillberg, and he began parodying the mannerisms and ring entrance style of then WCW World Heavyweight Champion Goldberg. On the November 29 episode of Sunday Night Heat, Gillberg faced Christian in a rematch for the Light Heavyweight Championship, but the match ended in a double disqualification after the debuting Blue Meanie, a new member of The J.O.B. Squad, interfered. On the following episode of Raw Is War, Gillberg scored another upset when he defeated Marc Mero, who had to (in storyline) retire from wrestling if he lost.

On December 13 at Rock Bottom, Gillberg defeated Matt Hardy to retain the Light Heavyweight Championship on an episode of Sunday Night Heat. However, The Brood defeated Snow, Scorpio, and Holly on the pay-per-view. A month later at the Royal Rumble, Blue Meanie, Snow, and Gillberg were each eliminated from the Royal Rumble match within a span of ten seconds.

=== Split ===
In February 1999, Scorpio was released by the WWF and returned to ECW while Gillberg was later phased out of storylines. After dwindling down to only two members, Snow wrestled against himself on an episode of Raw Is War before Holly came down to the ring to prevent Snow from hurting himself. Later that month at St. Valentine's Day Massacre, Bob Holly defeated Snow for the Hardcore Championship to permanently end The J.O.B. Squad. After making sporadic appearances throughout 1999 (including losing to Tiger Ali Singh at the UK No Mercy pay-per-view), Gillberg lost his Light Heavyweight Championship to the debuting Essa Rios on a February 2000 episode of Sunday Night Heat. Gill left the company soon afterwards. Blue Meanie began teaming with Goldust and later Stevie Richards from ECW. Meanie was taken off the WWF main roster in November 1999 and released in June 2000.

== Championships and accomplishments ==
- World Wrestling Federation
  - WWF Hardcore Championship (2 times) – Snow (1) and Holly (1)
  - WWF Light Heavyweight Championship (1 time) – Gillberg
