= The Corporation (professional wrestling) =

Professional wrestling stable

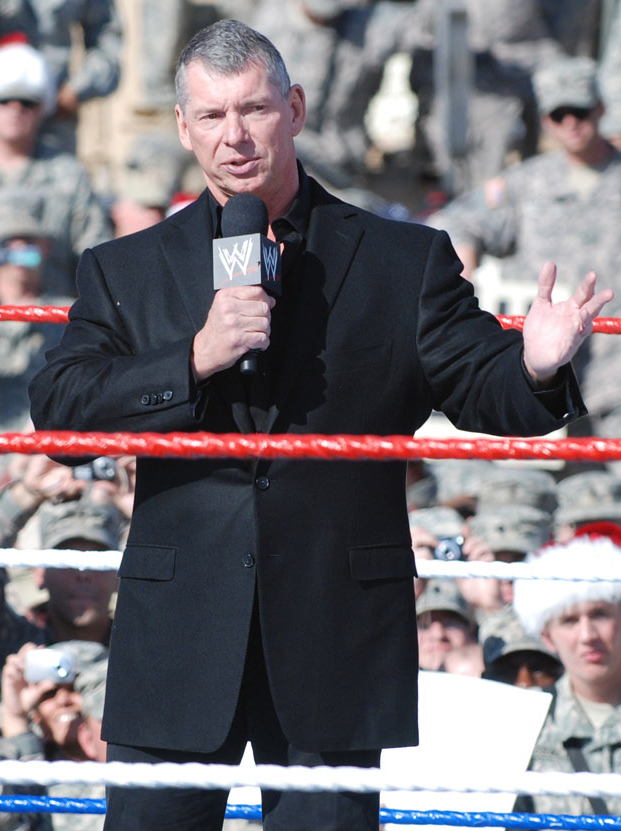
- Mr. McMahon, leader of The Corporation

Stable
- Leader(s): Mr. McMahon; Shane McMahon
- Members: see Members
- Name(s): The Corporation; Team Corporate; The Corporate Team
- Debut: November 16, 1998
- Disbanded: April 29, 1999
- Years active: 1998–1999

The Corporation was a villainous professional wrestling stable in the late 1990s in the Attitude Era in the World Wrestling Federation (WWF, now WWE). It was led by the McMahon family and was characterized by an authoritarian and corrupt attitude towards more rebellious wrestlers. The Corporation existed from mid-November 1998 to late April 1999 and feuded with Stone Cold Steve Austin, Mankind, D-Generation X (DX), and the Ministry of Darkness, eventually merging with the latter and forming the Corporate Ministry.

== History ==
The group was put together and led by WWF chairman Mr. McMahon in an attempt to secure control of the WWF and eliminate the more rebellious wrestlers, such as Stone Cold Steve Austin. Previously, McMahon started surrounding himself with an entourage consisting of The Corporate Stooges, Gerald Brisco and Pat Patterson, WWF commissioner Slaughter and his personal enforcer Big Boss Man to help him quell the rebellious actions of Austin. The Corporation was officially formed on November 16, 1998 when Shane and Vince McMahon along with Big Boss Man, Slaughter, and Pat Patterson and Gerald Brisco reconciled, joining forces with The Rock. The Rock was The Corporation's proclaimed "Crown Jewel" (and whom they helped win the WWF Championship at Survivor Series), holding the WWF Championship three times while part of the group. Later in the show, Intercontinental Champion Ken Shamrock would be recruited onto "Team Corporate", an unofficial name stated by announcer Jim Ross.

The group became notorious for using their political stroke in the company to give the group vast degrees of advantages in matches. Corporation members were known to adopt "cleaned-up businessmen" modifications to their individual characters. For example, The Rock's "People's Champion" modus operandi changed, as he became known as "The Corporate Champion" and the "People's Elbow" became "The Corporate Elbow" during his tenure in the stable. The group subsequently became the most dominant stable in the company by the end of 1998, with Corporate members The Rock, Ken Shamrock, and Big Boss Man holding the WWF, Intercontinental, and Hardcore Championships respectively. Shamrock and Big Boss Man were briefly double champions as well during this time, as they held the WWF Tag Team Championship.

The group proceeded to terrorize the rest of the WWF roster as well, freely using their political strokes and corporate agenda to put down their authority on other wrestlers. Besides Austin, who was their main adversary, the popular faction of rebels D-Generation X (DX) butted heads with the stable over principles with DX leader Triple H challenging The Rock for the WWF Championship, but often losing due to screwing on the part of The Corporation. The stable also found themselves under attack by Mankind, who was still bitter at Mr. McMahon for screwing him out of the WWF Championship at Survivor Series by having the bell rung when The Rock put the Sharpshooter on him immediately despite not tapping (recreating the previous year's Montreal Screwjob).

Though the group remained on top of the federation heading into 1999, members began to dwindle throughout the year. Then-commissioner Shawn Michaels was the first, having viciously being attacked by the group in a parking lot once it became clear he began to make decisions that did not cater to their interests. In reality, Michaels needed to have back surgery and the attack was to write him off television. Michaels was originally given the vacant commissioner position left by founding Corporation member Slaughter to use his powers on their behalf. Kane's membership was unsteady from the start as he was only a member because the McMahons threatened to send him back to the insane asylum if he did not cooperate with them. Kane officially left the group after WrestleMania XV when Chyna, who was coerced into leaving DX, turned on him during his match with Triple H, who in turn betrayed his DX brethren when he assisted Shane in his European Championship defense against X-Pac and joined forces with the Corporation.

When they entered a feud with The Ministry of Darkness who wanted to control WWF, Undertaker started to attack McMahon's family and Corporation, with a series of events like using Shane as a messenger boy, burning Stephanie's teddy bear, sacrificing Big Boss Man, invading Vince's house. At WrestleMania XV, Undertaker defeated Big Boss Man in a Hell in a Cell match. He hanged Big Boss Man with help of The Brood and Paul Bearer. After WrestleMania XV, Mr. McMahon was kicked out and his position as leader was usurped by Shane, who justified his actions by pointing out that Vince no longer cared about The Corporation and only about Stephanie McMahon, who was a target of The Undertaker. Brisco and Patterson were kicked out, with Shane stating there was no room in The Corporation for the old and replaced them with The Mean Street Posse. Ken Shamrock walked out on the group when he showed more loyalty to his sister Ryan, who was also being threatened by The Undertaker. Test took a beating and was kicked out after Shane stated that there was no room for the weak. Finally, The Rock was kicked out after he failed to take back the WWF Championship from Austin at Backlash, thanks to a botched interference from Shane McMahon and spouting venomous remarks that caused Shane to have the remaining Corporation members attack him.

With their dwindling numbers, they merged with the Ministry of Darkness to create The Corporate Ministry, thus revealing that the loss of members in the Corporation was a process of elimination, separating loyal members from the ones that would be troublesome. Vince McMahon rejoined the stable when it was revealed that he was the "higher power" of the Ministry of Darkness. The Corporate Ministry, however, crumbled when The Undertaker's relationship with Vince McMahon deteriorated after a loss to Austin over the WWF Championship in a First Blood match, and with that The Corporation was officially over. The storyline for this was cut, however, due to a legitimate injury from the Undertaker. Later on in 2000, remnants of the Corporation (Shane, Vince McMahon, and The Stooges), allied with then heels DX in 2000, creating The McMahon-Helmsley Faction. Although considered a different group, its goals and format were similar to The Corporation.

== The Union ==
The Union (standing for Union of People You Oughta Respect, Son, or U.P.Y.O.R.S.) was a short lived stable consisting of former Corporation members Ken Shamrock, Big Show and Test, and their leader, Mankind. They were a face stable who rebelled against the Corporate Ministry. The stable members came together because they felt they were being treated unjustly by The Corporation since Shane McMahon usurped power in the stable from his father, Vince McMahon. The group formed on May 3, 1999, four days after The Undertaker's Ministry of Darkness and Shane's Corporation merged to create The Corporate Ministry.

The four Union members were not alone as they feuded with the Corporate Ministry. The ousted chairman Vince McMahon briefly led the Union into battle, and superstars such as The Rock, Stone Cold Steve Austin, and WWF commissioner Shawn Michaels were loosely allied with the Union, as they all had common enemies in the Corporate Ministry. At Over the Edge, The Union defeated a Corporate Ministry team consisting of The Acolytes, Viscera and Big Bossman in an elimination match.

On May 31, Mankind received several sledgehammer blows to the knee in a hardcore match against Triple H. In reality, Mick Foley had needed knee surgery due to injuries suffered months earlier at Survivor Series, and then at St. Valentine's Day Massacre. He would be unable to wrestle until August 1999. The following week, Mr. McMahon revealed himself as the "higher power" which The Undertaker had been taking orders from the entire time he was in command of the Ministry of Darkness, and later the Corporate Ministry. With their lead wrestler injured and their enemy evolved into a different group, the Union quietly disbanded.

== Members ==
Member	Joined	Left	Notes
Mr. McMahon (Co-leader)	November 16, 1998	April 12, 1999	
Shane McMahon (Co-leader)	November 16, 1998	April 29, 1999	(Note: Merged with The Ministry of Darkness to form The Corporate Ministry)
Big Boss Man	November 16, 1998	April 29, 1999	
The Rock	November 16, 1998	April 26, 1999	
Ken Shamrock	November 16, 1998	April 12, 1999	
Pat Patterson	November 16, 1998	April 12, 1999	
Gerald Brisco	November 16, 1998	April 12, 1999	
Sgt. Slaughter	November 16, 1998	December 14, 1998	
Shawn Michaels	November 23, 1998	December 28, 1998	
Test	December 14, 1998	April 26, 1999	
Kane	December 21, 1998	March 28, 1999	
Chyna	January 25, 1999	April 29, 1999	
Big Show	February 14, 1999	March 28, 1999	
Pete Gas	March 22, 1999	April 29, 1999	
Rodney	March 22, 1999	April 29, 1999	
Triple H	March 28, 1999	April 29, 1999	

== Sub-groups ==
Affiliate	Members	Tenure	Type
The Stooges	Gerald Brisco Pat Patterson	November 16, 1998 – April 12, 1999	Tag team
Mean Street Posse	Pete Gas Rodney	March 22, 1999 – April 29, 1999	Tag team

== Championships and accomplishments ==
- Pro Wrestling Illustrated
  - Feud of the Year (1998, 1999) – Mr. McMahon (vs. Stone Cold Steve Austin)
  - Match of the Year (1999) – The Rock (vs. Mankind)
  - Most Popular Wrestler of the Year (1999) – The Rock
  - Rookie of the Year (1999)^{1} – Shane McMahon
- World Wrestling Federation
  - WWF Championship (3 times) – The Rock
  - WWF European Championship (1 time) – Shane McMahon
  - WWF Hardcore Championship (1 time) – Big Boss Man
  - WWF Intercontinental Championship (1 time) – Ken Shamrock
  - WWF Tag Team Championship (1 time) – Big Boss Man and Ken Shamrock
  - Royal Rumble (1999) – Mr. McMahon
- Wrestling Observer Newsletter
  - Best Booker (1998, 1999) – Mr. McMahon
  - Best Gimmick (1999) – The Rock
  - Best on Interviews (1999) – The Rock
  - Best Non-Wrestler (1999) – Mr. McMahon
  - Feud of the Year (1998, 1999) – Mr. McMahon (vs. Stone Cold Steve Austin)
  - Most Charismatic (1999) – The Rock
  - Most Improved (1998) – The Rock
  - Promoter of the Year (1998) – Mr. McMahon

1 McMahon refused the award, stating: "These are for the boys, not me".

== See also ==
- The Authority
