= Ministry of Darkness =

Professional wrestling stable

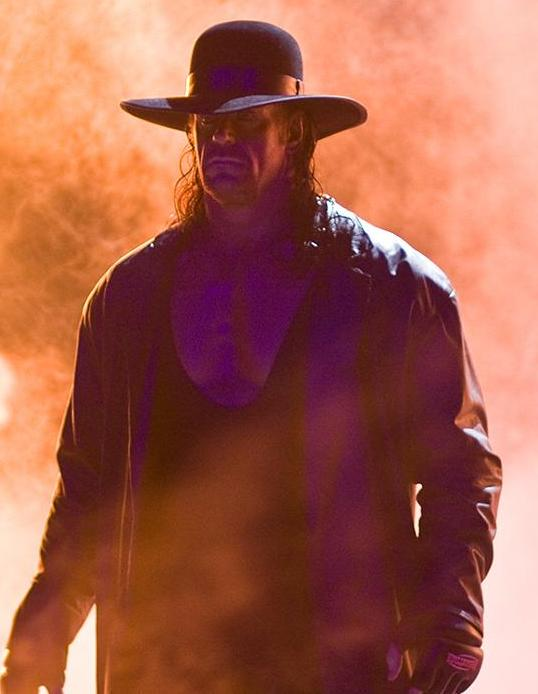
- The Undertaker, leader of The Ministry of Darkness

Stable
- Leader: The Undertaker
- Members: Paul Bearer (Manager); Bradshaw; Faarooq; Mideon; Viscera; Edge; Christian; Gangrel
- Debut: January 11, 1999
- Disbanded: April 29, 1999 (fused with The Corporation into the Corporate Ministry) September 23, 1999
- Years active: 1998–1999, 2004

The Ministry of Darkness was a villainous professional wrestling stable in the World Wrestling Federation (WWF, now WWE) in 1998-1999 during the Attitude Era. Led by The Undertaker, the Ministry was a controversial group with pseudo-witchcraft-themed storylines that included rituals and sacrifices.

== Concept ==
Mark Calaway, who portrayed The Undertaker character, had the idea of the Ministry of Darkness to preserve his character. He also jokingly pointed that he wanted Viscera in the stable because he didn't want to wrestle against him and he didn't pick Kane, who was the on-screen brother of The Undertaker, since he had a good singles run. Calaway also stated that he didn't like when the stable became The Corporate Ministry because it was "all watered down".

== History ==
=== Formation ===
After Paul Bearer turned his back on his son Kane and rejoined the side of Kane's brother The Undertaker at the Judgment Day: In Your House pay-per-view event in October 1998, The Undertaker announced The Ministry of Darkness and a "plague of evil" that would be unleashed on the WWF the next night on Raw Is War, making The Undertaker a heel. Since then, The Undertaker continued to feud with Kane and Stone Cold Steve Austin, which involved segments in which The Undertaker hit Austin in the head with a shovel giving him a storyline concussion, thus costing Austin the WWF Championship against The Rock. The following week on Raw Is War, interviews were conducted with Austin throughout the night in his hospital room in a medical center in the San Jose, California area, where the night before at a WWF live event Austin blacked out, as part of the storyline in the lead up to their Buried Alive match.

Later, The Undertaker and Paul Bearer abducted Austin, at first attempting to bury Austin alive, then attempting to embalm him alive. However, before The Undertaker could begin the embalming process, Kane came in and attacked The Undertaker. On that week's Sunday Night Heat, The Undertaker said that Austin would be sacrificed, but on Raw Is War instead The Undertaker called out Kane, they fought and then he called out Bearer, who brought the orderlies out to the ring and Kane escaped. Backstage, The Undertaker knocked Kane out with a chair shot and told Bearer to go get the orderlies. The Undertaker tried to wrap Kane in a body bag, but failed when Austin hit The Undertaker in the head with a shovel, knocking him out. It was assumed that The Undertaker attempted to have his brother committed to the mental asylum because Kane saved Austin from the embalming process in the funeral home earlier on Raw Is War. However, Austin put the fake Kane mask on The Undertaker, fooling everybody to think that Kane was going to the mental asylum, but unbeknownst to Bearer and the orderlies, The Undertaker was going to the asylum instead of Kane and later dumped Bearer into the sewer. The Undertaker tied and crucified Austin as payback for sending him to the asylum. The Undertaker's vile schemes were delayed when Kane cost him the Buried Alive match to Austin at Rock Bottom: In Your House on December 13 and he was not seen until the following month.

Meanwhile, Bradshaw and Faarooq formed The Acolytes, a dark and brooding tag team briefly managed by The Jackyl. Shortly after their debut, the Jackyl would mention on color commentary that his acolytes would usher in "an age of tribulation" in the WWF and that the Jackyl would be the "puppet master" controlling everything from the shadows, effectively setting the stage for The Ministry of Darkness with the Jackyl acting as the power behind the throne. However, The Jackyl left WWF at the end of 1998, just before Bradshaw and Faarooq came under the service of a then-unknown new leader.

As one of their first orders of business, they abducted Dennis Knight on the December 28 episode of Raw Is War and took him to a renewed, druid-like master "He". Weeks later, this "He" turned out to be The Undertaker, who, along with Paul Bearer, proceeded to initiate Knight as his servant via a ritual, renaming him as Mideon. At the Royal Rumble event in January 1999, The Undertaker, Mideon and The Acolytes abducted Mabel, who was renamed Viscera the following night on Raw Is War and turned him to The Undertaker's side. Another faction, The Brood (Christian, Edge and Gangrel), was recruited to The Undertaker's service as well. Then The Undertaker made it clear that he wanted to own the WWF and oust Vince McMahon.

=== First strike ===
During this time, Mr. McMahon started claiming that Mark Calaway (The Undertaker's real name) was taking his gimmick too far and that Calaway actually believed that he was in fact The Undertaker and that he was the second coming of the Lord of Darkness. McMahon, shook up, put The Undertaker in the second-ever Inferno match, a rematch in which The Undertaker faced off against Kane (who had joined Vince's Corporation to avoid being committed to the asylum). The Undertaker defeated Kane again, this time by placing his leg on fire and reduced the WWF owner to tears at the sight of a burning teddy bear. The bear was later said to have once belonged to Stephanie McMahon as a child.

For weeks, The Undertaker revealed that his Ministry actually took orders from a "greater power" and kept talking about a higher power who apparently owned the key to McMahon's heart and soul. The Undertaker and the Ministry trespassed on McMahon's property, leaving a burning crucifix resembling The Undertaker's symbol in McMahon's front yard. McMahon ordered his enforcer, Big Boss Man, to face The Undertaker in a Hell in a Cell match at WrestleMania XV on March 28, which The Undertaker won. After the match, The Brood lowered themselves from the rafters onto the top of the cell and then lowered a noose to The Undertaker, who sent McMahon another message by hanging Big Boss Man from the cell.

After WrestleMania XV, the mysterious woman in the storyline was revealed to be McMahon's own daughter Stephanie. The Ministry took Stephanie captive that night and Corporation member Ken Shamrock found her crying in the boiler room and with The Undertaker's symbol on her forehead. As vengeance on Shamrock for ruining his plans, The Undertaker ordered The Ministry to abduct Ken's storyline sister Ryan and sacrifice her on one of his symbols as a demonstration on The Undertaker's part of what would happen to Stephanie and McMahon was enraged, screaming at the camera and telling The Undertaker to stay away from Stephanie. The next week on Raw Is War, Shamrock found his sister crying in the basement along with Mankind, but was ambushed, attacked along with Mankind as well, captured and attempted to be sacrificed by The Ministry of Darkness. Since Ken forced some of it out of Christian, The Undertaker flogged him as punishment for giving the information to Shamrock that Stephanie was in the boiler room and the next week he tried to sacrifice Shamrock and then ordered Christian's fellow Brood members Edge and Gangrel to sacrifice him as well for his incompetence, but instead they refused and turned on The Undertaker and left the stable. This defection of The Brood was the only voluntary defection from the group during its tenure.

=== The Corporate Ministry ===
At Backlash on April 25, Mr. McMahon had Shamrock face The Undertaker in the hopes that Shamrock would break The Undertaker's ankle with his ankle lock toehold submission, but his plan backfired and Shamrock was attacked by Bradshaw after the match. Later, The Undertaker commandeered Stephanie McMahon's limo and shouting to her "Where to, Stephanie?" while laughing and drove off into the night with a screaming Stephanie in tow as Backlash went off the air. The next night on Raw Is War, The Undertaker held a "Black Wedding" for himself and Stephanie because if he married the WWF owner's daughter, he would control the entire WWF. His wish was about to come to fruition, until the ceremony was ruined successfully by Stone Cold Steve Austin, after two attempts by Corporation members Big Show and Ken Shamrock failed.

As a result, on the first episode of SmackDown!, The Undertaker proceeded to join forces with Vince McMahon's son Shane, in turn gaining control of The Corporation and merging his Ministry with it to form the even more powerful Corporate Ministry. However, after Mr. McMahon was revealed as its "Greater Power" on the June 7 episode of Raw is War, The Corporate Ministry would eventually dissolve. The Undertaker formed a new "Unholy Alliance" with Big Show (Mideon and Viscera later helped them as well) which led to two WWF Tag Team Championship reigns for Big Show and The Undertaker. This group came to an end when The Undertaker suffered a legit injury in September and was written out by quitting, rather than taking a match ordered by Mr. McMahon. At Judgment Day 2000, The Undertaker made his American Badass debut in WWF, signaling the end of the Ministry.

=== Legacy ===
In 2004, during the final three SmackDown! shows prior to The Undertaker and Bradshaw (now under the gimmick of JBL, the initialism of John Bradshaw Layfield) facing off at No Mercy for the WWE Championship in a Last Ride match, a series of Ministry-reminiscent events occurred between The Undertaker and his former servant:

- On the September 16, 2004 episode of SmackDown!, JBL called out The Undertaker. When The Undertaker came out and had JBL cornered, Gangrel and Viscera appeared and took out The Undertaker from behind, commencing an assault by the foursome of Gangrel, JBL, Orlando Jordan, and Viscera (however, Orlando Jordan was not a former member of the Ministry but a member of The Cabinet).
- The September 23 episode of SmackDown! saw Gangrel and Viscera, introduced as the Ministry, face The Undertaker in a handicap match, which was won by The Undertaker.
- On the September 30 episode of SmackDown!, JBL faced Hardcore Holly. The Undertaker had a vignette with the hearse telling JBL to prepare to take his last ride and rest in peace at No Mercy. In an interview after that and prior to the match, JBL had asked where was Orlando Jordan, and who was not with him. Following a preemptive assault by Holly, JBL came out for the match. During the match, he assaulted Holly with a weapon, getting disqualified, after which yet another The Undertaker vignette interrupted him. The Undertaker revealed Orlando hung high in the stands, crucified on his symbol.

JBL would beat The Undertaker at No Mercy with interference from Heidenreich to retain the WWE Championship. During this series, the SmackDown! announcers mentioned Gangrel and Viscera's former Ministry status, but never during the entire Undertaker/JBL feud was it brought up that Bradshaw used to be a part of the Ministry. Instead, the excuse given for Gangrel and Viscera's insert was that "JBL paid them off". However, at The Great American Bash in July 2006, as JBL was calling the match between Big Show and The Undertaker, JBL mentioned that he had fought The Undertaker for the WWE Championship and had been on his side in The Ministry of Darkness.

Edge, another member of the Ministry, debuted a new gimmick similar to the Ministry, during his feud against AJ Styles in 2022. This would lead to the formation of his stable known as The Judgment Day, consisting of himself, Damian Priest, Rhea Ripley, and Finn Bálor, who usurped Edge's leadership by expelling him from the group.

== Members ==
- The Undertaker (leader) (October 19, 1998 – September 23, 1999)
- Paul Bearer (manager) (October 19, 1998 – September 23, 1999)
- The Acolytes (Bradshaw and Faarooq) (December 28, 1998 – August 2, 1999)
- Mideon (January 11, 1999 – September 23, 1999)
- Viscera (January 24, 1999 – September 23, 1999)
- The Brood (Edge, Christian, and Gangrel) (February 1, 1999 – April 12, 1999)

== Championships and accomplishments ==
The championship and accomplishments of both the Ministry and Corporate Ministry.

- World Wrestling Federation
  - WWF Championship (1 time) – The Undertaker
  - WWF European Championship (1 time) – Mideon
  - WWF Tag Team Championship (2 times) – The Acolytes

== See also ==
- Disciples of the New Church
- Dungeon of Doom
