= WWF Backlash (1999) =

World Wrestling Federation pay-per-view event

Backlash
- Promotional poster featuring Mankind and The Rock, along with the event's original title before the In Your House-branding was discontinued
- Promotion: World Wrestling Federation
- Date: April 25, 1999
- City: Providence, Rhode Island
- Venue: Providence Civic Center
- Attendance: 10,939
- Buy rate: 400,000

Pay-per-view chronology
← Previous; WrestleMania XV	Next → No Mercy

Backlash chronology
← Previous; First	Next → 2000

The 1999 Backlash was a professional wrestling pay-per-view (PPV) event produced by the World Wrestling Federation (WWF, renamed WWE in 2002) and presented by Castrol GTX. It was the inaugural Backlash and took place on April 25, 1999, at the Providence Civic Center in Providence, Rhode Island. The concept of the event was based around the backlash from the WWF's flagship event, WrestleMania.

In line with the event's concept, the main event was a rematch from WrestleMania XV between "Stone Cold" Steve Austin and The Rock for the WWF Championship, but this time with a special guest referee, Shane McMahon. Lower down on the card, Big Show and Mankind had a Boiler Room Brawl to settle matters after their previous encounter, which had decided who would referee the WrestleMania main event. Triple H also wrestled X-Pac due to Triple H causing X-Pac to lose a match for the European Championship the previous month.

The event had originally been promoted as "Backlash: In Your House", but the branding was dropped as the WWF discontinued the In Your House series before Backlash was held (the In Your House series would later briefly return from 2020 to 2022 as an NXT event). As a result, Backlash was the first non-In Your House monthly PPV held by the promotion outside of the "Big Five" events at the time (WrestleMania, King of the Ring, SummerSlam, Survivor Series, and Royal Rumble).

== Production ==
=== Background ===
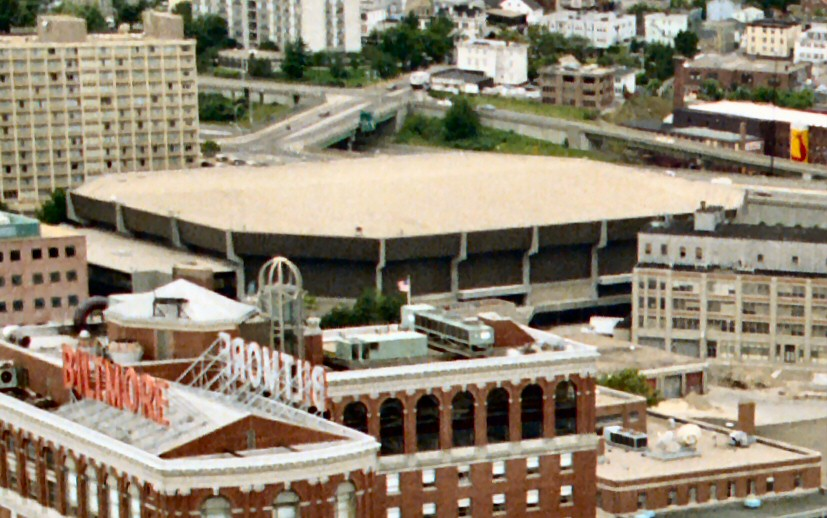
The inaugural Backlash was held at the Providence Civic Center in Providence, Rhode Island.

From May 1995 to February 1999, the World Wrestling Federation (WWF, renamed WWE in 2002) ran a series of monthly professional wrestling pay-per-view (PPV) events titled In Your House, which were held between the promotion's five major PPVs at the time: Royal Rumble, WrestleMania, King of the Ring, SummerSlam, and Survivor Series, referred to as the "Big Five". The next event was originally to be "Backlash: In Your House", but in early April, the WWF phased out the In Your House events to establish permanent names for the monthly PPVs held between the "Big Five". Backlash in turn dropped the In Your House branding and was the first monthly PPV held following the discontinuation of the In Your House shows. Early advertising had included the In Your House branding, but it was dropped in the weeks leading up to the PPV. Backlash was subsequently held after WrestleMania XV and it took place on April 25, 1999, at the Providence Civic Center in Providence, Rhode Island. The concept was based around the backlash from WrestleMania, the WWF's flagship event.

=== Storylines ===
The event consisted of eight professional wrestling matches with predetermined outcomes. The matches involved wrestlers portraying their characters (known as gimmicks) in planned storylines that took place before, during and after the event.

The main feud going into the event involved the WWF Championship, which "Stone Cold" Steve Austin had won from The Rock at WrestleMania XV. The following night on Raw is War, however, Austin demanded the return of his Smoking Skull belt, a personalized championship belt that he had worn the previous year during his tenure as WWF Champion, which villainous WWF owner Mr. McMahon had stolen from him at Breakdown: In Your House, after causing Austin to lose. Rather than oppose him as he usually would, McMahon acquiesced to the request as The Undertaker had threatened his family. Mr. McMahon's son, Shane, disagreed and went against his father's wishes, stealing the Smoking Skull belt and giving it to The Rock, who was part of the villainous alliance The Corporation. Shane then unceremoniously ejected his father from The Corporation while Austin and Rock continued to feud over ownership of Austin's personalized belt. This culminated with a fight between the two which ended with Rock throwing Austin, and then the belt, into a river from a bridge in Detroit which alluded to the events of December 1997 when Austin threw Rock's Intercontinental Championship into the Oyster River. The Rock held a mock funeral the following week for Austin, revealing he still had possession of the Smoking Skull belt; Austin crashed the funeral with a monster truck and crushed Rock's limousine and hearse. During the Sunday Night Heat that aired before the event, Shane declared that the match was to have a no disqualification stipulation and announced himself as the special guest referee.

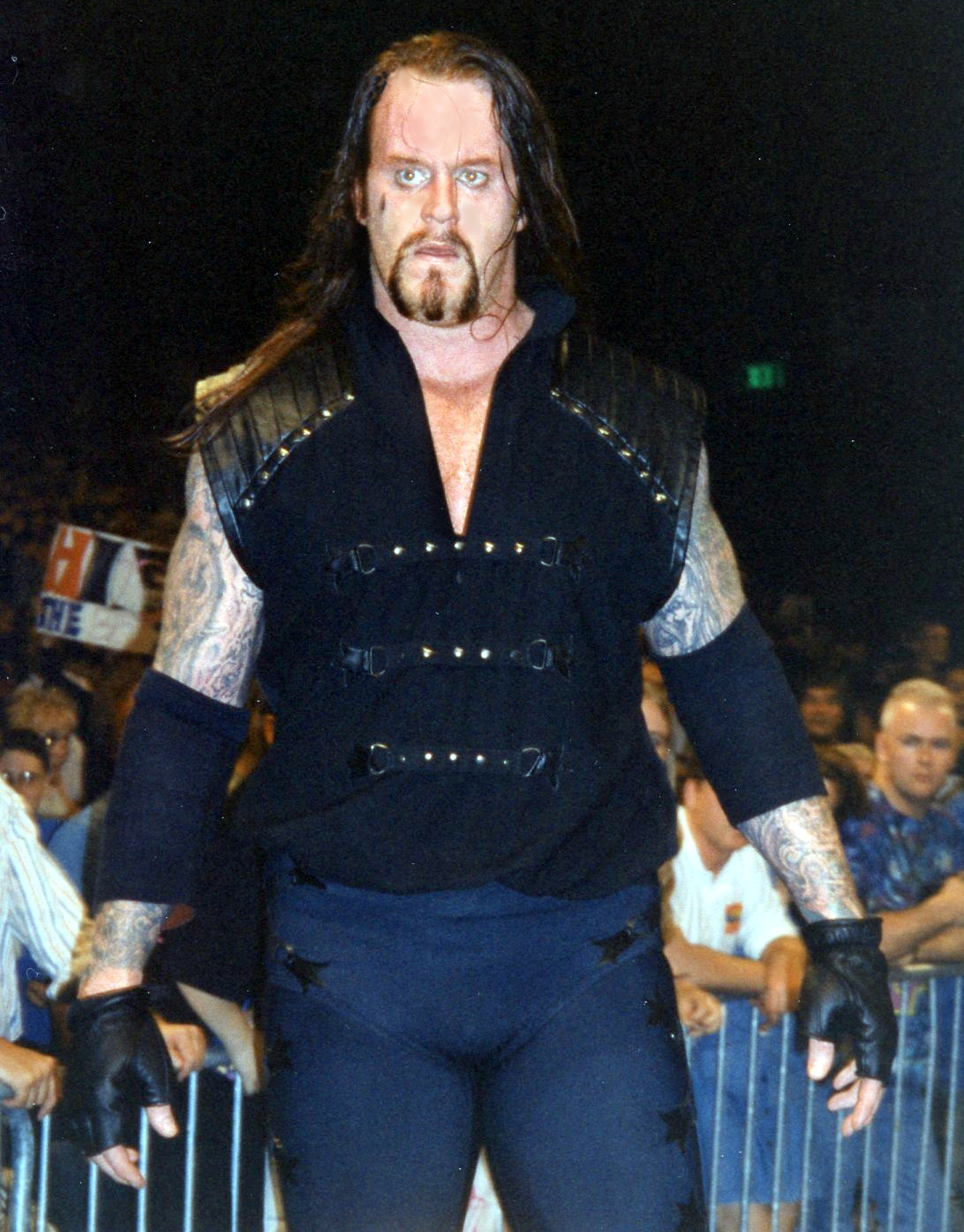
The Undertaker's Ministry of Darkness group was involved in a number of rivalries at Backlash

The Undertaker, meanwhile, was involved in a storyline where he became the leader of a Satanic group of wrestlers called The Ministry of Darkness. During the beginning of the year he began to articulate a desire for Stephanie McMahon leading to a Hell in a Cell match at WrestleMania where Corporation member The Big Boss Man was hanged from the ceiling. Undertaker then became more aggressive in his actions, demanding Stephanie and offering 'sacrifices' when she was not given over to him. One woman he sacrificed, via crucifixion, was Ryan Shamrock who played the on-screen sister of Ken Shamrock. Fighting for family honor, Shamrock vowed to break Undertaker's leg.

Undertaker's obsession with Stephanie led to another match being made at the event. During April Undertaker successfully managed to abduct Stephanie, however Shamrock, looking for revenge, set about trying to find her and attacked various members of the Ministry for her whereabouts. Eventually Christian revealed where she was, forcing The Undertaker to reprimand him by whipping him and leading to a crucifixion. While he was in the Ministry along with Edge and Gangrel, the three also made up a smaller group named The Brood who chose Christian over the Ministry and saved him, leaving the Ministry. This led to Undertaker's minions being forced to wrestle the Brood.

Elsewhere on the card, Triple H fought X-Pac due to events that transpired at WrestleMania. During the event Chyna, who had been Triple H's valet and girlfriend but had since turned on him to ally with Kane, reunited with Triple H. The two, who were in a wrestling group called D-Generation X, came to ringside later in the match to ostensibly help fellow D-Generation X member X-Pac in his match against Shane McMahon. The two attacked X-Pac in order to ally with McMahon and The Corporation, however, and as a result, X-Pac lost the European Championship match.

Two hardcore wrestling matches were scheduled for the card. The first was a specialty match, a Boiler Room Brawl based around wrestler Mankind who was billed as being "from the boiler room". As a former member of The Corporation and challenger for The Rock's WWF Championship in December and January, Mankind found himself coming to blows with the Corporate enforcer Big Show, especially when Big Show caused Mankind to lose his belt in a ladder match, removing him from the main event of WrestleMania. Desperate to be part of WrestleMania's main event, Mankind staked a claim to be the special guest referee but Corporation leader Vince McMahon preferred Big Show officiating to ensure The Rock remained champion. The two had a match at WrestleMania to determine who would referee the main event, which Mankind won by disqualification. In the storyline, however, Mankind was hospitalized after the match, while Big Show was arrested after he punched McMahon for slapping him. With this, Big Show left The Corporation but maintained a desire to settle the score between the two in a hardcore match. Gradually the two came to respect each other, rescuing the other from Corporate assaults, but wanted to wrestle for pride.

The other hardcore match on the card was for the WWF Hardcore Championship; Bob Holly had wrestled Al Snow on the banks of the Mississippi River two months prior and despite the latter being notorious for his hardcore prowess, Holly picked up the victory. The two fought at WrestleMania but the match also included Billy Gunn and a deciding bout was needed. On Raw is War episodes leading up to Backlash, "Dr. Death" Steve Williams would regularly feud with both Snow and Holly for the WWF Hardcore Championship, where he was managed by Jim Ross. A notable match involved Williams and Holly wrestling each other in a frat house in Albany, New York on the March 22, 1999 edition of Raw is War, and a match the week after where Snow hit Williams with a frying pan behind the referee's back. On the April 5, 1999 episode, Snow and Holly had a singles match, where Williams attacked both of them with suplexes in revenge.

Williams was scheduled to fight Snow and Holly at the pay-per-view, making the hardcore match a three-way for the WWF Hardcore Championship. However, Williams was taken off of television in mid-April for needing further time to rehab his injury and for refusing to work for FMW. He was released shortly afterwards. Williams had been being built as a midcarder at the time in hopes of repairing his character after the WWF Brawl For All, feuding with Snow and Holly since March.

The final rivalry going into the evening saw Goldust try to regain his WWF Intercontinental Championship. On Raw is War Goldust was scheduled to defend against Big Boss Man but The Godfather, a wrestler whose gimmick involved being a pimp, offered Boss Man some prostitutes to take his place and won the title.

== Event ==
Other on-screen personnel
Role:	Name:
English commentators	Jim Ross
English commentators	Jerry Lawler
Spanish commentators	Carlos Cabrera
Spanish commentators	Hugo Savinovich
Interviewers	Kevin Kelly
Interviewers	Michael Cole
Ring announcer	Howard Finkel
Referees	Mike Chioda
Referees	Earl Hebner
Referees	Jim Korderas
Referees	Theodore Long
Referees	Tim White

=== Sunday Night Heat ===
Before the pay-per-view event went on air, the crowd was warmed up with the cable television program Sunday Night Heat which consisted of four matches. In an intergender tag team contest, Val Venis and Nicole Bass defeated D'Lo Brown and Ivory when Nicole Bass pinned Ivory. Afterward Bass made sexual advances to Venis who quickly departed. In another tag team match, Droz and Prince Albert defeated Too Much (Brian Christopher and Scott Taylor) when Albert pinned Scott Taylor. After this Kane pinned The Big Boss Man in a singles match. The final match of the show saw Viscera pin Test after Big Boss Man hit Test with a nightstick, pretending to be aiming for Viscera.

=== Preliminary matches ===
The first match on the pay-per-view was the six-man tag match between The Brood and The Ministry of Darkness. Mideon began by placing an eyeball in a jar in the middle of the ring to scare his opponent Christian. During the match the Ministry would distract the referee to ambush the various Brood members while the Brood tended to use double team moves until Edge was isolated from tagging his partners. After Edge managed to tag in Christian the teams ignored the tag team rules and all wrestled in the ring, with Edge using a kneeling Christian to run and jump into the corner to attack Mideon and Christian then doing the same with Gangrel to jump onto Bradshaw in the opposite corner. After this the teams began to brawl outside aside from Christian and Bradshaw. Christian almost won the match after a tornado DDT from the corner but Ministry member Viscera came to ringside and squashed Christian against the ring then threw him back in, allowing Bradshaw to use his Clothesline From Hell finisher and pin him.

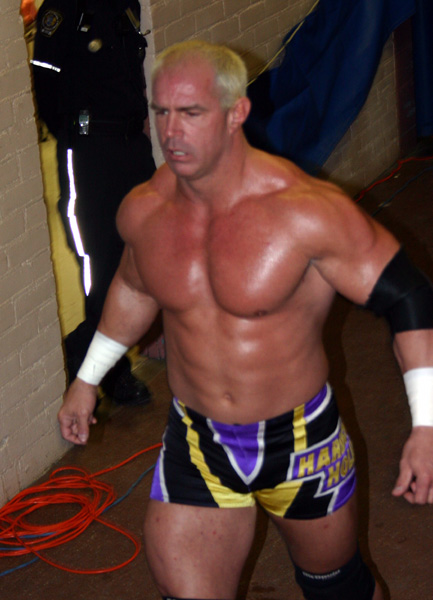
Hardcore Holly lost the WWF Hardcore Championship to Al Snow

The following match was for the Hardcore Championship, meaning there were few restrictions on the wrestlers who are allowed to use weapons and pin their opponent anywhere. The match began abruptly when Hardcore Holly used his championship belt to hit Al Snow. The match quickly moved outside the ring and into the crowd on the concrete floor. Snow performed a moonsault from the crowd barrier but was unable to pin Holly. After returning to the ring and fighting with a hockey stick, the two fought through to the backstage area and Holly tried to hit Snow with a kitchen sink but dropped it when he was sprayed with a hose. The two then moved through the parking lot and Holly threw Snow from the stairs into a dumpster where Holly tried to pin Snow on top of a bin bag. Snow also tried to pin his opponent on top of a car after an elbow drop. The match returned to the ring and Snow hit Holly with a frying pan but refused to pin him, opting instead to put him on a table and climb to the top rope; Holly recovered and stopped Snow, then superplexed Snow through the table length ways. After both wrestlers recovered, Snow grabbed a manikin head that he brought to ringside and hit Holly with it then pinned him to win the championship.

The third match was for the Intercontinental Championship and began with the challenger Goldust attacking The Godfather from behind as he checked on his prostitutes at ringside. After being thrown out the ring, Goldust went to leave the ring but was persuaded to return by The Blue Meanie. Meanie also involved himself in the match by attacking Godfather when he was thrown out of the ring and choking him on the bottom rope he then gave Goldust a sack of flour but Godfather punched it into Goldust's eyes. The blinded Goldust then began to punch Meanie and perform the Shattered Dreams (a kick to the crotch) on him. Godfather then kicked Goldust and pinned him but saw that Meanie was about to break up the pin and moved out of the way, leading to Goldust being headbutted in the groin. Godfather threw both men into the turnbuckle and performed the Ho Train move on them both before picking Goldust over his shoulders and driving his head down into the mat for the Pimp Drop to win and retain his title.

After this a tag team match took place between the New Age Outlaws, a team made of The Road Dogg and Billy Gunn and the team of Jeff Jarrett and Owen Hart. The latter team's manager, Debra, wore a skimpy outfit and the Outlaws tried to make her strip, when she wouldn't Gunn offered to do so himself first, living up to his moniker Mr. Ass. This led to the Outlaws being attacked from behind. Road Dogg and Jarrett began wrestling until Hart took a blind tag in an attempt to take advantage, though Dogg ran the two partners into each other. During the match Dogg had Hart secured in a back slide pin for more than three seconds but Jarrett distracted the referee from making the pin count. After Road Dogg was isolated for some time, Billy Gunn was tagged in and energetically took out both members before the two delivered a synchronized ten punch to their opponents in opposite corners. The match turned briefly and Hart and Jarrett tried to perform simultaneous submissions – the Sharpshooter and figure four leg lock, respectively – but Jarrett could not lock in the move. With Gunn free, he jumped onto Hart and sat on his head to slam Hart's head into the mat for the Fameasser, freeing Road Dogg of the Sharpshooter and allowing them to win the match. Afterward Gunn mooned the crowd.

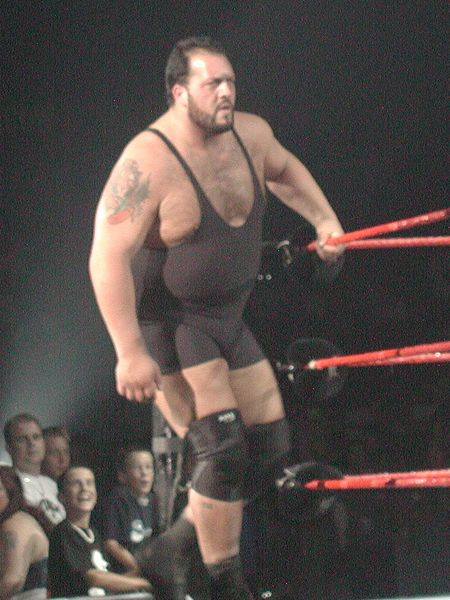
Big Show wrestled in his first and only Boiler Room Brawl

The next contest was Mankind's specialty match – a violent and brutal Boiler Room Brawl, where a contestant must leave the arena's boiler room to win. Big Show entered and looked for Mankind who hit him from behind with a stick and then pushed him into the electricity cupboard. The two continued to throw the other into the walls of the room and Mankind then broke a pane of glass over Show's head, making both men bleed – Show's head and Mankind's hand which left bloody prints over the walls. Mankind then climbed a ladder but was chokeslammed from it through a table. After being thrown into a ramp Mankind took advantage by spraying steam into Show's face, then unleashing suspended pipes from above onto him, burying Show. Mankind then escaped the room to win the match only to be assaulted by Big Boss Man and Test and driven back into the room. After Show escaped from the pipes and realized Mankind was being attacked, he slammed Test and chased Boss Man away while Mankind put on Mr. Socko and used the mandible claw on Test.

A standard singles match followed this between rivals Triple H and X-Pac. During the match Chyna, who was supporting Triple H, tried to attack X-Pac but he made it clear he would not refrain from attacking her. With Triple H sitting in the corner, X-Pac tried to perform the bronco buster – riding an opponent's shoulders – but after Chyna distracted X-Pac, Triple H was able to escape the move and force X-Pac into the turnbuckle, which played up to a genuine neck injury X-Pac suffered the previous year. Triple H then focused on his attack on the neck, particularly keeping him in a neck hold for a number of minutes and then a similar dragon sleeper. X-Pac fought back but was thrown out of the ring where Chyna attacked him. After suffering more assault to his neck, X-Pac evened the match with a sleeper hold and then built a fast momentum of kicks and tosses, almost winning the match after a tornado DDT from the top rope. Triple H escaped the ring but when X-Pac attempted a baseball slide he knocked out referee Mike Chioda. Chyna then interfered, knocking out X-Pac but suddenly the lights went out, signaling the entrance of Kane. He chokeslammed Triple H, then Chyna and put them in the corner and left the arena so X-Pac could perform a bronco buster on both but while he was attacking Chyna, Triple H recovered and used The Pedigree on X-Pac to win the match.

=== Main event matches ===
The penultimate match was between The Undertaker and Ken Shamrock. Undertaker had control of the match early on, using wrestling throws and punches while Shamrock countered by using submission holds to keep Undertaker down. Undertaker began to dominate the match so much so that the referee tried to reprimand him, but his stare scared the referee out of the ring. Undertaker then put Shamrock in a bow and arrow submission. Undertaker then tried to perform a standing leg drop but as his leg landed on Shamrock's neck, Shamrock rolled it round into a submission hold. Shamrock later had Undertaker in his ankle lock but had to break it when Bradshaw came to the ring, though he was quickly knocked down. Shamrock picked Undertaker up but Undertaker floated over him so that Shamrock was being held and was then had his head driven to the mat with a Tombstone Piledriver which ended the match. After this, Bradshaw assaulted Shamrock with a baseball bat and strangled him with it.

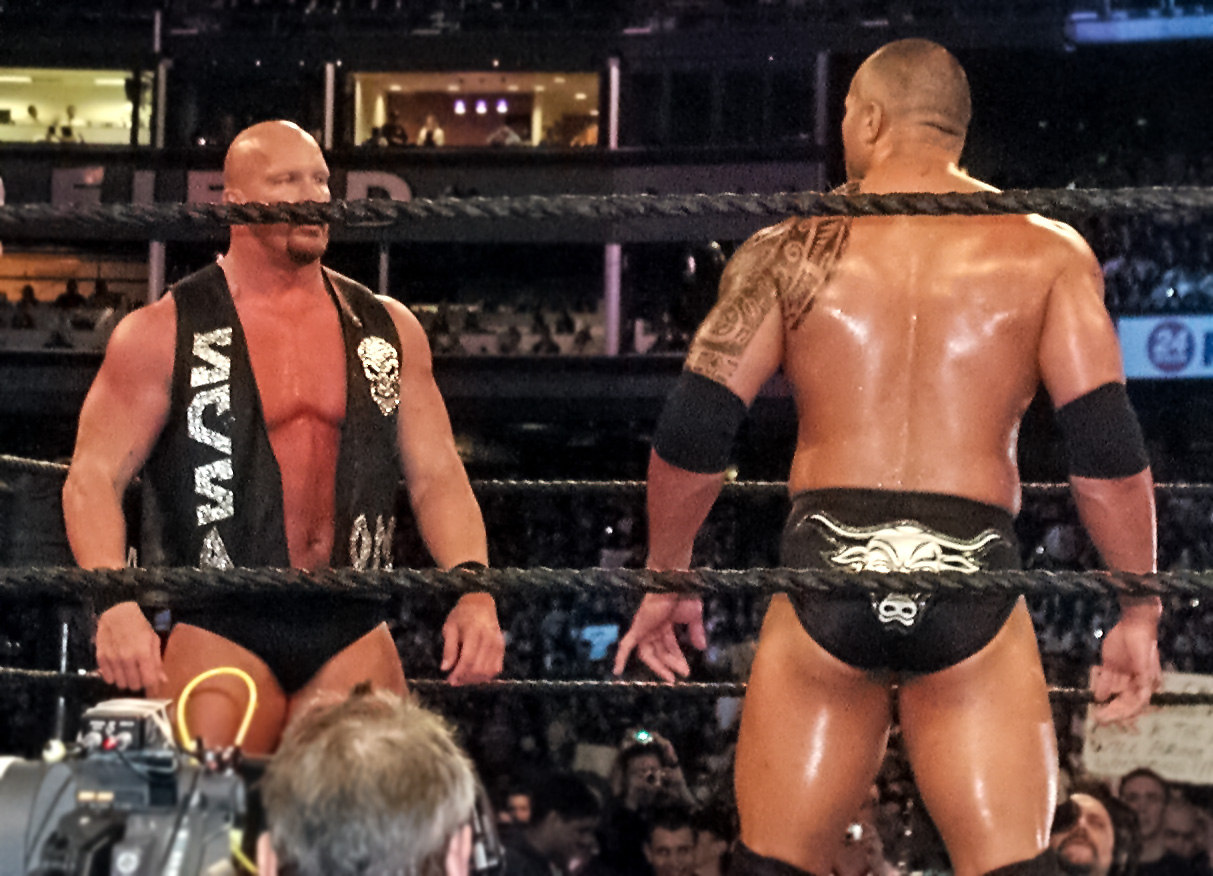
"Stone Cold" Steve Austin and The Rock had a rematch from WrestleMania XV

The final match saw "Stone Cold" Steve Austin defend his WWF Championship against The Rock with Shane McMahon as the referee. Austin ran into the ring without gesturing to the crowd and the two began striking each other. The two then fought up the entrance way with Rock using a fire extinguisher as a weapon. Austin tried to Irish whip Rock but it was reversed and he himself was sent into the steel girders and fencing that set the entrance way; as he fell into it, most of it tumbled down. After more brawling between the two, Austin then threw Rock into the other side and the entrance way completely collapsed. The two continued to throw one another into various walls, barriers and technical boxes until they returned to the ring. After kicking Rock in the corner, McMahon tried to admonish him allowing Rock to make a running attack but Austin saw and threw him to the outside. While out the ring, Austin tried to put his opponent through the Spanish announcers' table but it was reversed into a Rock Bottom; Rock then stole a Spanish headset and insulted one of the Spanish announcers and Austin. Rock also took a camera from the production crew and stood on the remaining table above Austin and pointed the camera over him to mock him. After this he showed the crowd, declaring himself to be their champion but as he turned back the camera was confronted with Austin giving him the finger; Austin then delivered a Stone Cold Stunner by grabbing Rock round the neck (and camera) and pulling downwards collapsing the table. The two made it back to the ring and McMahon also came into the ring with the title belt. He ran at Austin who ducked, meaning the belt knocked Rock down. Austin pinned him but McMahon, in an allusion to the previous year's Survivor Series, counted two before physically swearing at Austin and fleeing from the ring. As Shane retreated, his father Vince came down to ringside with a referee and the Smoking Skull Belt; he then hit Shane with it. While the other ref was in the ring, Austin inadvertently hit the referee thanks to a shove from The Rock and then stumbled into Rock, who nailed him with the Rock Bottom. After Shane was hit outside, Rock then hit Austin with the proper championship belt but Austin kicked out of the pin, and immediately retaliated with a Stone Cold Stunner and then hit Rock with the belt, covering him for the pinfall to win the match and retain the WWF title.

After the match Vince McMahon reluctantly handed the Smoking Skull belt to Austin, who then celebrated with both belts. The feed then shifted to a limousine in the parking lot with Stephanie McMahon seated in the back. Despite waiting for her father, the car suddenly started driving. The feed then showed the inside of the car as the divide between passenger and chauffeur drew down to show The Undertaker in the driver's seat, turning and asking, "Where to, Stephanie?"

== Reception ==
Canadian Online Explorer's professional wrestling section rated the entire event 8 out of 10, declaring "the World Wrestling Federation had something to prove and prove it they did" in reference to a lackluster WrestleMania. Both the main event and the Boiler Room Brawl received a full 10 with reviewer John Powell declaring the main event had "enough imagination in it" to top their previous encounter. While most matches had strong ratings, the Intercontinental Championship match was given a lowly 4 out of 10. The most criticized match was the penultimate contest between The Undertaker and Ken Shamrock which was given only 3 out of 10 and described as an "unbearably boring, 18 minute-plus submission hold extravaganza".

== Aftermath ==
A second Backlash event was held the following year after WrestleMania 2000, thus establishing Backlash as an annual PPV for the WWF; in 2002, the WWF was renamed to World Wrestling Entertainment (WWE, which became an orphaned initialism in 2011). With the exception of the 2005 event, which was held in May, Backlash was held every April through the 2009 event. Throughout this time, it retained its position as the post-WrestleMania PPV. Following the 2009 event, however, Backlash was discontinued and replaced by Extreme Rules in 2010. Backlash was reinstated in 2016, but it was held in September after that year's SummerSlam, thus ending its previous tradition of being the post-WrestleMania PPV. In 2021, however, Backlash was positioned as the first PPV held after WrestleMania 37, thus the event returned to its original concept and was titled "WrestleMania Backlash". The 2022 event was also held under the same name, while the 2023 event returned the event to its original "Backlash" name but still maintaining the post-WrestleMania concept.

This event turned out to be Owen Hart’s final pay-per-view match he would compete in before his accidental death one month later at Over the Edge.

== Results ==
No.	Results	Stipulations	Times
1^{H}	Val Venis and Nicole Bass defeated D'Lo Brown and Ivory	Mixed tag team match	1:43
2^{H}	Droz and Prince Albert defeated Too Much (Brian Christopher and Scott Taylor)	Tag team match	1:09
3^{H}	Kane defeated Big Boss Man (with Test)	Singles match	2:45
4^{H}	Viscera defeated Test (with Big Boss Man)	Singles match	2:09
5	The Ministry of Darkness (Bradshaw, Faarooq, and Mideon) defeated The Brood (Gangrel, Edge, and Christian)	Six-man tag team match	11:38
6	Al Snow (with Head) defeated Hardcore Holly (c)	Hardcore match for the WWF Hardcore Championship	15:27
7	The Godfather (c) defeated Goldust (with The Blue Meanie)	Singles match for the WWF Intercontinental Championship	5:22
8	The New Age Outlaws (Billy Gunn and Road Dogg) defeated Jeff Jarrett and Owen Hart (with Debra)	Tag team match to determine #1 contenders to the WWF Tag Team Championship	10:33
9	Mankind defeated Big Show	Boiler Room Brawl	7:40
10	Triple H (with Chyna) defeated X-Pac	Singles match	19:19
11	The Undertaker (with Paul Bearer) defeated Ken Shamrock	Singles match	18:50
12	"Stone Cold" Steve Austin (c) defeated The Rock	No Holds Barred match for the WWF Championship; Shane McMahon was the special guest referee.	17:07
(c) / – the champion(s) heading into the match; H / – the match was broadcast prior to the pay-per-view on Sunday Night Heat
