= Mideon =

American professional wrestler (born 1968)

Personal information
- Born: Dennis Knight; December 26, 1968 (age 57) Clearwater, Florida, U.S.
- Family: Ron Slinker (stepfather); Loma Slinker

Professional wrestling career
- Ring name(s): Dennis Knight; Leatherface; Mideon; Midian; Naked Mideon; Phineas I. Godwinn; Tex Slazenger
- Billed height: 6 ft 3 in (191 cm)
- Billed weight: 288 lb (131 kg)
- Billed from: "Bitters, Arkansas" (as Phineas I. Godwinn)
- Trained by: Steve Keirn
- Debut: July 23, 1989
- Retired: December 1, 2012

Dennis Knight (born December 26, 1968) is an American chef and retired professional wrestler. He is best known for his appearances with World Championship Wrestling between 1992 and 1994 under the ring name Tex Slazenger and with the World Wrestling Federation (WWF, now WWE) between 1996 and 2001 under the ring names Phineas I. Godwinn and Mideon, as well as his real name.

== Early life ==
Knight grew up in the Tampa Bay Area, in the city of Clearwater, Florida. He attended Salem University in Salem, West Virginia, where he played American football for the Tigers. After suffering a severe shoulder injury, Knight left Salem College and returned to Florida, where he worked as a bouncer.

== Professional wrestling career ==
=== Early career (1989–1992) ===
While working as a bouncer in Clearwater, Florida, Knight was introduced to Steve Keirn, who trained him as a professional wrestler. He debuted in 1989 under the ring name "Tex Slazenger", facing his stepfather, Ron Slinker, in his first match. Knight went on to wrestle on the independent circuit in the Carolinas.

In 1991, Knight joined the Memphis, Tennessee-based United States Wrestling Association, where he adopted the ring name "Leatherface" and a gimmick based on the character from the 1974 film The Texas Chain Saw Massacre, complete with "bloodstained" apron, leather mask and chainsaw (without the chain). He was pushed as a "monster" in a feud with Jerry Lawler. During one infamous match between the two, Knight was set on fire. After dropping the Leatherface gimmick, Tex teamed up with Mark Canterbury who wrestled as the masked "Master Blaster".

After leaving the USWA, Knight wrestled in Florida, Puerto Rico and Japan before receiving a tryout with World Championship Wrestling in 1992.

=== World Championship Wrestling (1992–1994, 1995) ===
In 1992, Knight was hired by World Championship Wrestling, where he was renamed "Tex Slazenger" and given the character of an "ornery Texas outlaw". Knight formed a tag team with Canterbury, now wrestling as Shanghai Pierce. Knight and Pierce left WCW in 1994.

In May 1995, Knight returned to WCW as Tex Slazenger, where he defeated Eddie Jackie and lost to Sting and Randy Savage.

=== United States Wrestling Association (1995–1996) ===
When both men left WCW, Canterbury signed with the World Wrestling Federation under the ring name "Henry Godwinn" while Slazenger returned to the USWA. In the USWA, Slazenger captured the USWA Southern Title on two occasions, defeating Brian Christopher both times.

=== World Wrestling Federation (1996–2001) ===
==== The Godwinns and Southern Justice (1996–1998) ====
In 1996, Knight signed with the WWF and was therefore reunited with Canterbury and renamed "Phineas I. Godwinn" (abbreviated to P.I.G.). The duo were portrayed as being cousins (later brothers) and were collectively known as The Godwinns. Phineas made his in-ring debut on the January 29 episode of Monday Night Raw in a tag team victory for Godwinns over The Bodydonnas and began a feud with Bodydonnas over their manager Sunny. They soon entered a tournament for the vacant Tag Team Championship and defeated The New Rockers and Owen Hart and British Bulldog to qualify for the finals on the March 31 episode of Free for All, where they lost to Bodydonnas. They failed to win the titles from Bodydonnas in a rematch for the titles at In Your House 7: Good Friends, Better Enemies. On May 19, Godwinns defeated Bodydonnas to win the Tag Team Championship at a live event in Madison Square Garden. As a result, they gained Bodydonnas' valet Sunny as their manager on the May 26 episode of Free for All, where they lost their newly won titles to The Smoking Gunns.

In 1997, in a match between The Godwinns and the Legion of Doom, Canterbury suffered a cracked C7 vertebra when the Legion of Doom botched a Doomsday Device. He was advised by doctors to rest for 15 weeks, but returned to the ring in less than eight weeks. In early 1998, the Godwinns dropped their pig farmer gimmicks and became "Southern Justice", the bodyguards of Tennessee Lee, using their real names. Six months later, Canterbury herniated his C7 vertebra and pinched a spinal nerve, necessitating spinal fusion surgery. This came as a result of him returning to the ring too early after his neck injury. He eventually left the WWF and retired, due to the neck injury suffered in 1997 leaving Knight without a partner.

==== Mideon and The Ministry of Darkness (1999-2000) ====
In late 1998, Knight returned to the WWF after a brief hiatus, and in a short time, was kidnapped by the Acolytes and brainwashed into joining the Ministry of Darkness, a heel Satanic-themed stable led by The Undertaker, who rechristened him as the deranged soothsayer "Midian" (spelling later changed to "Mideon"). Throughout 1999, The Ministry feuded with Stone Cold Steve Austin, with Mideon often teaming up with Viscera. Mideon "won" the WWF European Championship in this time when he found it in Shane McMahon's bag. Mideon held the belt for over a month until losing it to D'Lo Brown at Fully Loaded. When The Undertaker was injured in late 1999, the Ministry disbanded, however, Mideon continued the gimmick and union with Viscera, including doing The Undertaker's biddings in matches well after The Ministry had dissolved, although no clear stable was ever established again.

==== Various storylines (2000–2001) ====
In early 2000, Knight appeared briefly as a Mankind imitator.

Knight returned in a limited capacity in mid-2000 as "Naked Mideon", a persona who ran around arenas wearing only a fanny pack, a pair of boots and a thong. At No Mercy 2000 he tried to reclaim the European Championship from William Regal, but was defeated. At Armageddon 2000, Knight briefly interfered in the match between Chris Jericho and Kane. Knight then wrestled in a few dark matches under his previous moniker Tex Slazenger, but was released in January 2001.

=== Later career and retirement (2001–present) ===
Following his run with the WWF, Knight returned to his home in Tampa, Florida and spent time training students at Steve Keirn's Pro Wrestling school. During this time he also continued to wrestle for several Florida independent promotions such as IPW and the FSPW, as well as touring Europe.

From 2003 to 2004, Knight returned for several dark matches for World Wrestling Entertainment under his own name.

Knight appeared at the NWA Total Nonstop Action event TNA Destination X 2005 on March 13, 2005 during the scheduled match between Monty Brown and Trytan. In the course of the match, the lights went off and Trytan vanished from the ring. When the lights came on, a masked Knight was in his place and was quickly pinned by Brown. TNA never revealed on air who was under the mask and released Knight the following day.

Knight retired from professional wrestling in 2006. He wrestled several matches for Great Lakes Championship Wrestling in 2011 and 2012.

On November 22, 2020, Knight returned to WWE together with Henry O. Godwinn as The Godwinns, to take part in The Undertaker's retirement ceremony at Survivor Series. Several other members of the Bone Street Krew also appeared to pay tribute.

== Personal life ==
After retiring from professional wrestling, Knight began working as a chef in Clearwater, Florida.

Knight has an eyeball tattooed on the back of his head and a tattoo of Doc Holliday on his left arm.

In 2023, Knight lost all of the toes on his right foot after developing an infection that required them to be amputated.

== Championships and accomplishments ==
- Championship Wrestling from Florida
  - CWF Tag Team Championship (1 time) - with Jumbo Baretta
- Independent Professional Wrestling
  - IPW Hardcore Championship (1 time)
- Future Stars of Pro Wrestling
  - FSPW Hardcore Championship (1 time)
- Professional Wrestling Federation
  - PWF Tag Team Championships (1 time) - with Jumbo Baretta
- United States Wrestling Association
  - USWA Heavyweight Championship (2 times)
- World Wrestling Federation
  - WWF European Championship (1 time)
  - WWF Tag Team Championship (2 times) – with Henry O. Godwinn
- Wrestling Observer Newsletter
  - Worst Tag Team (1996, 1997, 1999) – with Henry Godwinn & Viscera

== See also ==
- The Corporate Ministry
- The Godwinns
- The Ministry of Darkness
