= Royal Rumble (1997) =

World Wrestling Federation pay-per-view event

- Promotional poster featuring Shawn Michaels
- Promotion: World Wrestling Federation
- Date: January 19, 1997
- City: San Antonio, Texas
- Venue: Alamodome
- Attendance: 60,525
- Buy rate: 196,000
- Tagline: No More Mr. Nice Guy!

Pay-per-view chronology
← Previous; In Your House 12: It's Time	Next → In Your House 13: Final Four

Royal Rumble chronology
← Previous; 1996	Next → 1998

The 1997 Royal Rumble was a professional wrestling pay-per-view (PPV) event produced by the World Wrestling Federation (WWF, renamed WWE in 2002). It was the 10th annual Royal Rumble event and took place on January 19, 1997, from the Alamodome in San Antonio, Texas. The event was based around the men's Royal Rumble match, a modified 30-man battle royal in which the participants enter at timed intervals instead of all beginning in the ring at the same time and the winner received a WWF Championship match at WrestleMania 13.

The main event saw Shawn Michaels defeat Sycho Sid to win the WWF Championship. The main match on the undercard was the 1997 Royal Rumble match, which "Stone Cold" Steve Austin won after last eliminating Bret Hart. This was the third Royal Rumble event in which the titular match was not the main event, after the inaugural 1988 event and the 1996 event. Additionally, Vader defeated The Undertaker, and Hunter Hearst Helmsley defeated Goldust to retain the WWF Intercontinental Championship.

The attendance of 60,477 was the highest recorded live crowd in the Royal Rumble's history until the 2025 edition of the event. In addition to hometown hero Shawn Michaels going for the WWF Championship, the WWF was working with the Mexican promotion Lucha Libre AAA Worldwide (AAA) and had several of its wrestlers participate in the Royal Rumble match, as well as in a number of undercard matches. Years later in 2025, WWE acquired AAA, with a select few of its wrestlers subsequently appearing in the annual Royal Rumble match beginning in 2026.

== Production ==
=== Background ===
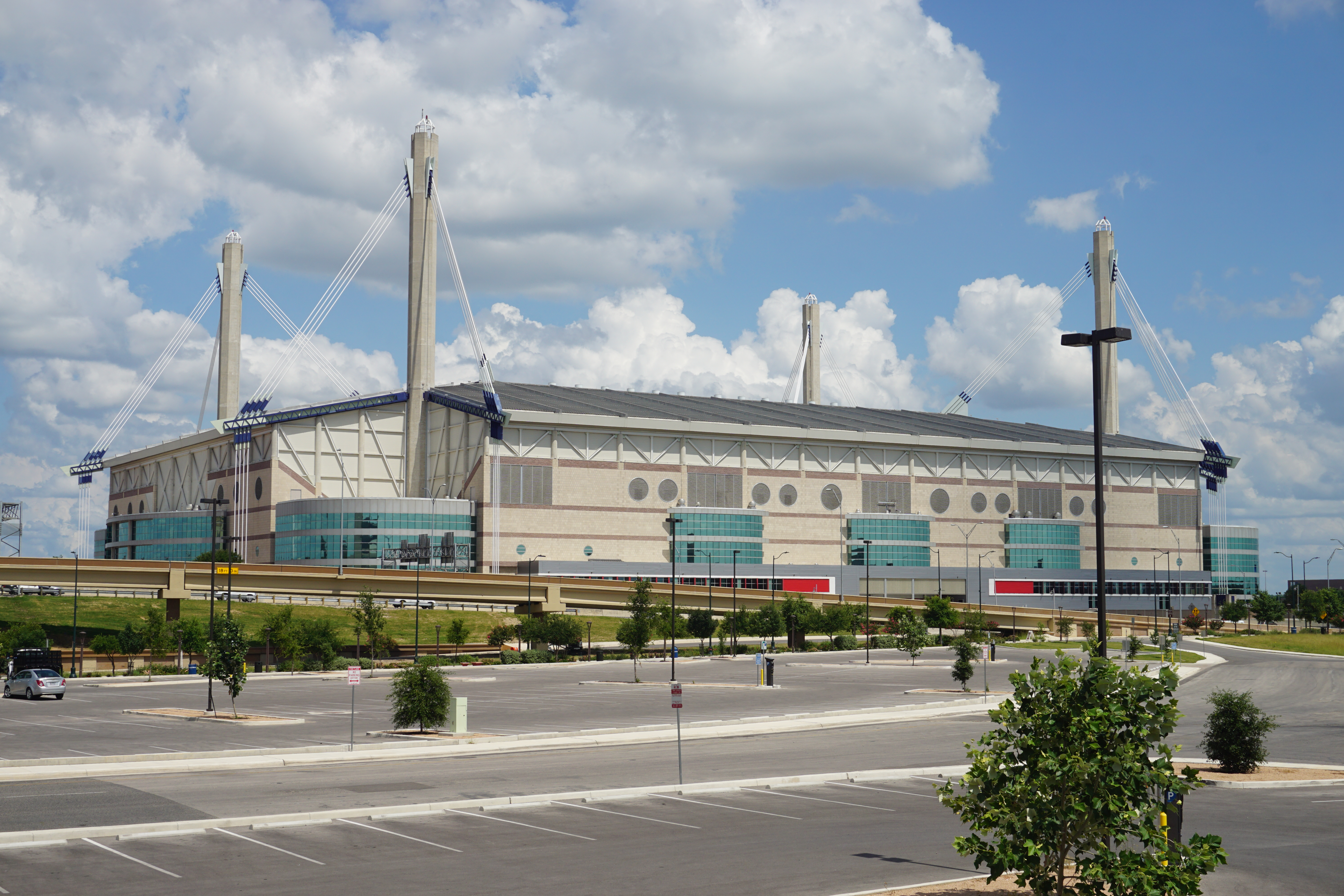
The 10th annual Royal Rumble event was held at the Alamodome in San Antonio, Texas.

The Royal Rumble is an annual professional wrestling event, produced every January by the World Wrestling Federation (WWF, renamed WWE in 2002) since 1988; that first event was a television special before it became an annual pay-per-view (PPV) beginning in 1989. It is one of the promotion's original four PPVs, along with WrestleMania, SummerSlam, and Survivor Series, referred to as the "Big Four", and was considered one of the "Big Five" PPVs with the addition of King of the Ring in 1993. It is named after and centered on the men's Royal Rumble match. The 10th Royal Rumble event was scheduled to be held on January 19, 1997, from the Alamodome in San Antonio, Texas.

The Royal Rumble match is a modified battle royal in which the participants enter at timed intervals instead of all beginning in the ring at the same time, and the match generally features 30 wrestlers. Since 1993, the winner earns a world championship match at that year's WrestleMania. For 1997, the winner earned a match for the WWF Championship at WrestleMania 13.

=== Storylines ===
The event comprised six matches that resulted from scripted storylines. Results were predetermined by the WWF's writers, while storylines were produced on WWF's weekly television show, Monday Night Raw.

The feud between Goldust and Hunter Hearst Helmsley centered around Goldust's manager, Marlena. During the free broadcast prior to In Your House 12, Helmsley attempted to seduce Marlena. Goldust responded by attacking Helmsley during matches in the following weeks. The feud escalated on the December 30, 1996, episode of Raw during a match between Goldust and Jerry Lawler. Helmsley came to the ring and tried to carry Marlena away. Marc Mero, who had dropped the WWF Intercontinental Championship to Helmsley, blocked Helmsley's path, but the distraction was enough to cause Goldust to be counted out.

On July 22, 1996, Faarooq Asad made his WWF debut by attacking Ahmed Johnson, the Intercontinental champion. He claimed that he attacked Johnson because Johnson was not "from the streets", as Faarooq claimed to be. Soon after the attack, Johnson was diagnosed with a legitimate kidney problem, so the WWF claimed that Faarooq's attack had hospitalized Johnson. Johnson was unable to compete for several months and was forced to vacate the Intercontinental Championship. When Johnson returned to the WWF, he interfered in several matches involving Faarooq's stable, the Nation of Domination. He attacked them with a two-by-four, which led to an angle in which Johnson was suspended for the attacks. By December, Johnson's injury had recovered sufficiently to allow him to resume wrestling, and a match was scheduled for the next pay-per-view, the Royal Rumble.

Vader and The Undertaker did not have a substantial buildup to their match at Royal Rumble 1997. Vader had joined other heel wrestlers to attack The Undertaker on several occasions, but there was no major storyline behind their match. The Undertaker had been involved in a feud with Paul Bearer that dated back to SummerSlam 1996, when Bearer had turned on The Undertaker. On the January 5, 1997 episode of WWF Superstars, The Undertaker attacked Vader's manager, Jim Cornette, leaving Vader without a manager at the Royal Rumble.

The feud between Sid and Shawn Michaels dated back to 1995, when Michaels had hired Sid as a bodyguard. Sid interfered during the Michaels vs. Diesel main event at WrestleMania XI by distracting the referee, but the plan backfired when the referee was unable to count the pinfall after Michaels superkicked Diesel. On the following night's episode of Monday Night Raw, Michaels told Sid that he would not be needed in the case of a Michaels vs. Diesel rematch. Sid responded by turning on Michaels and powerbombing him three times. This attack led to a feud between Sid and Diesel, but Sid and Michaels were reunited as partners in an elimination match at Survivor Series 1995. During the match, Michaels accidentally kicked Sid in the face, which led to Sid being eliminated. Sid retaliated by powerbombing Michaels again. Once again, the feud was not developed, as Sid left the WWF. Sid returned to the WWF on the July 8, 1996 episode of Monday Night Raw when Michaels introduced him as a partner in a six-man match at In Your House 9. Sid helped Michaels several times in the coming months by saving him from attacks by other wrestlers. At In Your House 11, Sid defeated Vader to win a WWF Championship match against Michaels at Survivor Series 1996. During the match at Survivor Series, Sid attacked Jose Lothario, Michaels' manager, with a television camera. While Michaels was distracted, Sid hit him with the camera and powerbombed him to win the title. A rematch was later booked for Royal Rumble 1997.

== Cancelled Match ==
A second Free for All Match with Owen Hart and The British Bulldog defending the WWF Tag Team Championship's against Pierroth and Cibernético and Furnas and Lafon was planned, but the match didn't happen. Nevertheless, Pierroth and Cibernético were moved into the Royal Rumble Match.

== Event ==
Other on-screen personnel
Role:	Name:
English commentators	Vince McMahon
English commentators	Jim Ross
English commentators	Jerry Lawler
Spanish commentators	Carlos Cabrera
Spanish commentators	Arturo Rivera
Spanish commentators	Hugo Savinovich
French commentators	Jacques Rougeau, Sr.
French commentators	Raymond Rougeau
Interviewer	Dok Hendrix
Interviewer	Todd Pettengill
Ring announcer	Howard Finkel
Referees	Mike Chioda
Referees	Jack Doan
Referees	Jim Korderas
Referees	Earl Hebner
Referees	Pepe Casas

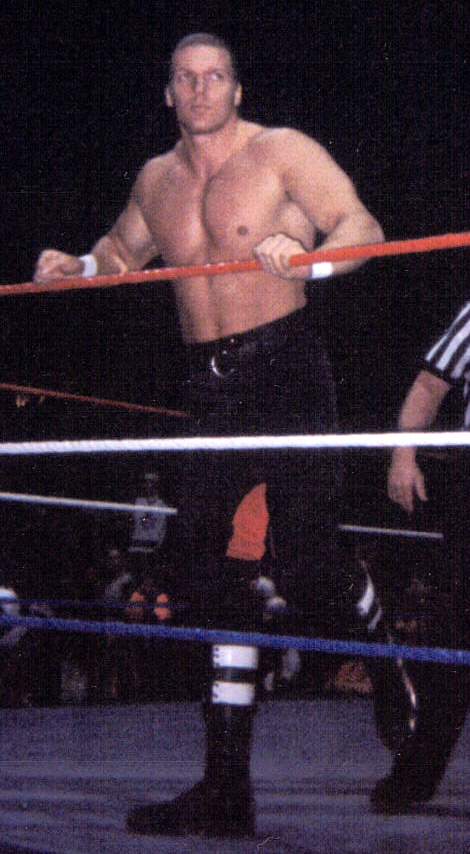
Hunter Hearst Helmsley retained the Intercontinental Championship

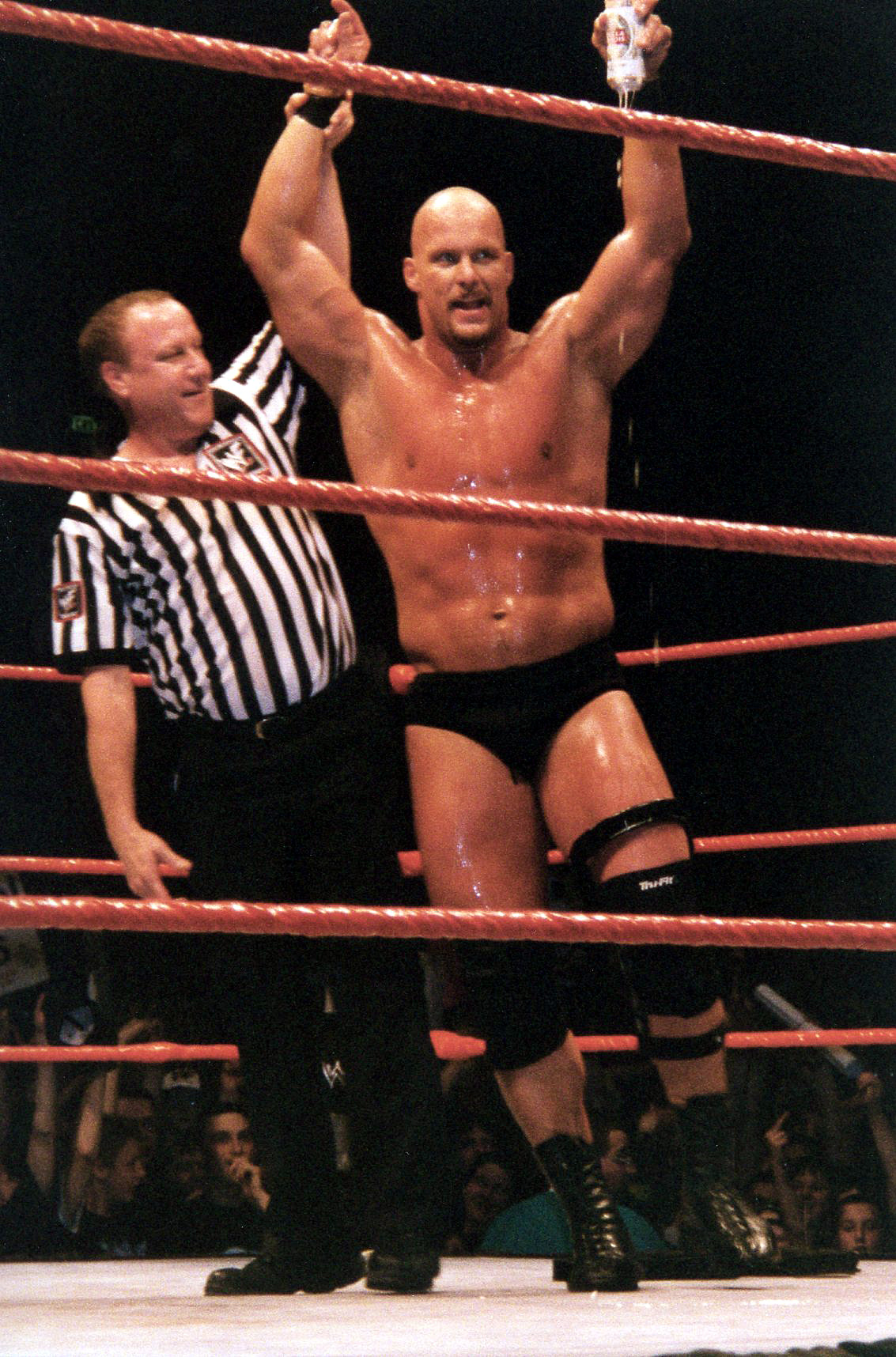
"Stone Cold" Steve Austin won the Royal Rumble match by eliminating Bret Hart

The event opened with the Intercontinental Championship match between Goldust and the champion, Hunter Hearst Helmsley. Before the match began, Goldust attacked Helmsley up the aisle, but they then returned to the ring where they continued to brawl back and forth. Later into the match, Helmsley would attempt to hit Goldust with the Intercontinental Championship belt, however, Goldust countered and grabbed the belt and hit Helmsley with it, and as Goldust attempted to pin Helmsley, Mr. Hughes, who was at ringside as a bodyguard for Helmsley, pulled Helmsley out of the ring. Hughes then continued his distraction on Goldust, which led to Helmsley delivering a Pedigree and pinning Goldust for the win, thus Helmsley retained the Intercontinental Championship.

In the next match, Faarooq faced Ahmed Johnson. Johnson won the match by disqualification after members of the Nation of Domination, who were at ringside, interfered on Faarooq's behalf.

The third match was the encounter of The Undertaker and Vader. Undertaker gained control early into the match; however, Vader gained control after Paul Bearer, who was at ringside in Vader's corner, hit Undertaker with an urn. The Undertaker did not retaliate, as Vader hit a Vaderbomb on him, which gained a successful pinfall for the win.

The next match was a six-man tag team match featuring wrestlers from the AAA organization between the team of Héctor Garza, Perro Aguayo, and El Canek against the team of Jerry Estrada, Heavy Metal, and Fuerza Guerrera. A slow-paced match ensured between the two teams, as they exchanged control of the match back and forth. Late into the match, the two teams brawled outside of the ring, as Aguayo hit Metal with a diving double foot stomp off the top rope, which gained a successful pinfall, thus Garza, Aguayo and Canek won the match.

The Royal Rumble match began with Ahmed Johnson and Crush, where the rivalry with Johnson and Faarooq continued, as Johnson eliminated himself after Faarooq came down the aisle to chase him. "Stone Cold" Steve Austin was the fifth entrant and recorded three quick eliminations, taking out Phineas I. Godwinn, Bart Gunn, and Jake Roberts.

Numerous wrestlers from AAA were invited to be entrants in the match. Mil Mascaras eliminated Cibernetico and Pierroth and then eliminated himself by diving onto them at ringside; years later Bruce Prichard stated that this spot had been devised because WWE creative anticipated that Mascaras would refuse to allow himself to be eliminated by anyone else; the Mexican star had long been notorious for refusing to allow other wrestlers to defeat him.

Austin continued in the match and recorded four more eliminations, the last of which was The Real Double J near the 25-minute mark. The next wrestler to enter the match was his rival Bret Hart, and the two began exchanging blows. Neither man could eliminate the other, so the match continued. The last man to enter the match was The Undertaker, at number thirty.

Austin, who had been in the match for nearly forty-five minutes by this point, was joined by Hart, Undertaker, Vader, and Diesel as the last five men in the match. While the men in the ring were fighting to determine a winner, a brawl had broken out on the floor between Mankind and Terry Funk. Referee Jim Korderas, who was standing at ringside to watch for eliminations, was unable to break the fight up and Mike Chioda, who was also assigned to the match, left his position to assist his fellow referee. Hart then tossed Austin over the top rope near where Chioda had been stationed. However, since he and Korderas were otherwise occupied, Austin realized that nobody had seen Hart eliminate him; he returned to the ring and pushed Vader and Undertaker over the top, then threw Hart out as he finished eliminating Diesel; Austin was declared the winner of the match. With ten eliminations, Austin tied Hulk Hogan for the most eliminations in single Royal Rumble match. The record stood until 2001, when Kane eliminated eleven competitors.

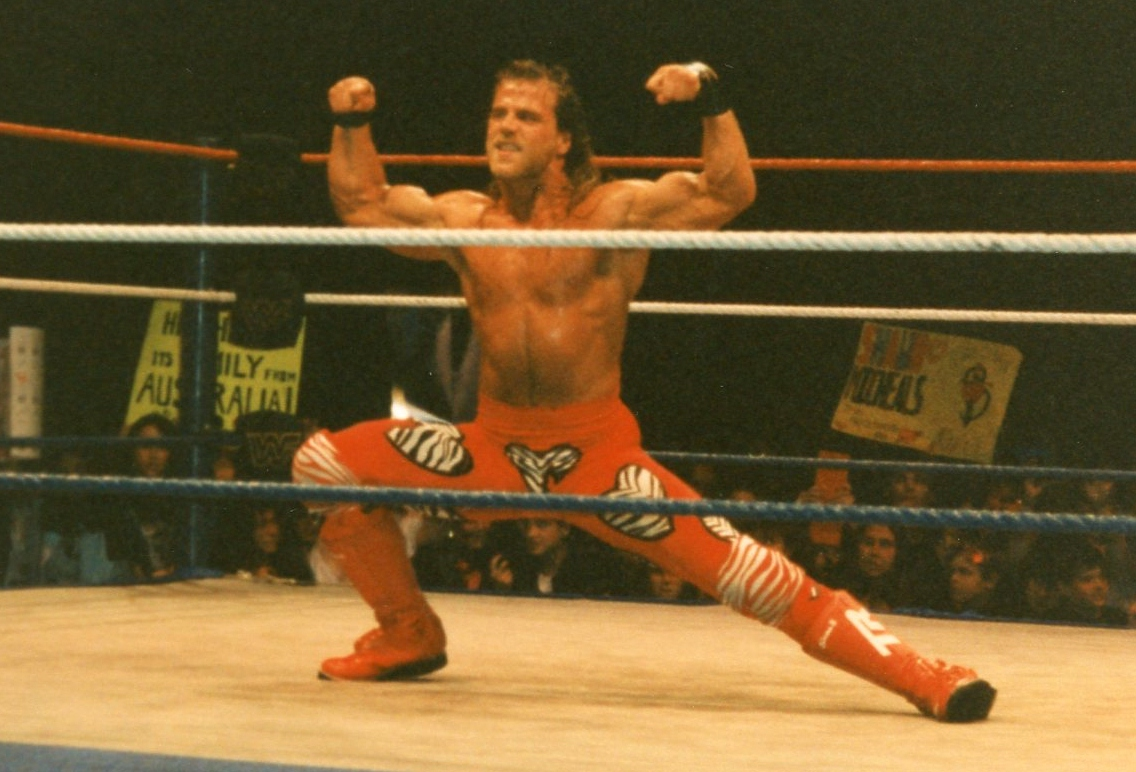
Shawn Michaels defeated Sycho Sid to win the WWF Championship

The main event was a WWF Championship match between Shawn Michaels and Sycho Sid. Sid dominated most of the match and worked over on Michaels's back early into the match, however Michaels retaliated by hitting a flying elbow drop on Sid. Michaels then attempted to deliver Sweet Chin Music to Sid, however, he countered by tossing Michaels over the top rope onto ringside. As Sid threw Michaels back into the ring, Michaels accidentally hit referee Earl Hebner. Sid then delivered a Chokeslam and attempted to pin him, however, as the first referee was down, a second referee came out to count the pin, which got a two count. Sid then attacked the second referee, which allowed Michaels to hit Sid with a camera and delivered Sweet Chin Music, as the original referee slowly counted the successful pinfall, thus Michaels won the WWF Championship.

== Aftermath ==
On the episode of Monday Night Raw that followed the pay-per-view, an angry Hart demanded that he be declared the winner of the Royal Rumble due to Austin's methods in winning the match, threatening to quit the company altogether if he was not. Although WWF Commissioner Gorilla Monsoon did not reverse the decision, he also refused to grant Austin the championship match at WrestleMania due to his actions and announced a match at the next In Your House event where Austin and the three men (Undertaker, Vader, Hart) he eliminated after returning to the match would compete in a Four Corners match with the winner receiving the championship match at WrestleMania.

However, three days before the event on a special Thursday edition of Raw, Michaels declared that he would be vacating the WWF Championship he was scheduled to defend that night against Sid due to a severe knee injury and that he had "lost his smile" and needed to find it again. Furthermore, the Four Corners match at In Your House would now be contested for the vacant championship and the winner would face Sid the next night on Raw. Hart won the WWF Championship at the pay-per-view, but interference from Austin resulted in him losing the title to Sid on Raw. On the March 17 edition of Raw, Hart and Sid faced off in a Steel Cage match for the WWF Title. Sid won after interference by both "Stone Cold" and Undertaker. At WrestleMania 13, Undertaker defeated Sid for the WWF Title, while Hart and Austin battled each other in a Submission match with Ken Shamrock as the special referee.

== Results ==
No.	Results	Stipulations	Times
1^{D}	Perro Aguayo Jr. and Venum defeated Maniaco and Mosco de la Merced by pinfall	Tag team match	10:00
2^{D}	Blue Demon Jr., Octagón and Tinieblas Jr. defeated Abismo Negro, Heavy Metal, and Histeria by pinfall	Six-man tag team match	14:00
3^{F}	Mascarita Sagrada Jr. and La Parkita defeated Mini Mankind and Mini Vader by pinfall	Tag team match	4:29
4	Hunter Hearst Helmsley (c) (with Mr. Hughes) defeated Goldust (with Marlena) by pinfall	Singles match for the WWF Intercontinental Championship	16:50
5	Ahmed Johnson defeated Faarooq (with the Nation of Domination) by disqualification	Singles match	8:48
6	Vader (with Paul Bearer) defeated The Undertaker by pinfall	Singles match	13:19
7	Canek, Héctor Garza, and Perro Aguayo defeated Heavy Metal, Fuerza Guerrera, and Jerry Estrada by pinfall	Six-man tag team match	10:56
8	"Stone Cold" Steve Austin won by last eliminating Bret Hart	30-man Royal Rumble match for a WWF Championship match at WrestleMania 13	50:30
9	Shawn Michaels (with José Lothario) defeated Sycho Sid (c) by pinfall	Singles match for the WWF Championship	13:49
(c) / – the champion(s) heading into the match; D / – this was a dark match; F / – the match was broadcast prior to the pay-per-view on Free for All

=== Royal Rumble entrances and eliminations ===
A new entrant came out approximately every 90 seconds. Early in the Rumble match, Vince McMahon stated on commentary that they had problems with the clock.

– Indicates a wrestler from Lucha Libre AAA Worldwide (AAA), who was in a partnership with the WWF at the time.

– Winner

Draw	Entrant	Order	Eliminated by	Time	Eliminations
1	Crush	3	Phineas Godwinn	06:17	0
2	Ahmed Johnson	2	Himself	03:02	2
3	Razor Ramon	1	Ahmed Johnson	00:17	0
4	Phineas I. Godwinn	4	"Stone Cold" Steve Austin	02:52	1
5	"Stone Cold" Steve Austin	-	Winner	45:07	10
6	Bart Gunn	5	"Stone Cold" Steve Austin	00:26	0
7	Jake "The Snake" Roberts	6	"Stone Cold" Steve Austin	01:10	0
8	The British Bulldog	8	Owen Hart	08:04	1
9	Pierroth	10	Mil Máscaras	10:32	1
10	The Sultan	7	The British Bulldog	03:23	0
11	Mil Máscaras	11		07:28	2
12	Hunter Hearst Helmsley	12	Goldust	06:42	0
13	Owen Hart	17	"Stone Cold" Steve Austin	08:29	2
14	Goldust	13	Owen Hart	05:33	1
15	Cibernetico	9	Mil Máscaras and Pierroth	01:25	0
16	Marc Mero	16	"Stone Cold" Steve Austin	03:53	0
17	Latin Lover	14	Faarooq	01:47	0
18	Faarooq	15	Ahmed Johnson (counted as self-elimination)	00:41	1
19	Savio Vega	18	"Stone Cold" Steve Austin	00:46	0
20	Jesse James	19	"Stone Cold" Steve Austin	00:29	0
21	Bret Hart	29	"Stone Cold" Steve Austin	21:12	2
22	Jerry Lawler	20	Bret Hart	00:04	0
23	Diesel	28	Bret Hart	17:49	0
24	Terry Funk	24	Mankind	15:18	0
25	Rocky Maivia	23	Mankind	13:00	0
26	Mankind	25	The Undertaker	12:20	2
27	Flash Funk	21	Vader	06:12	0
28	Vader	26	"Stone Cold" Steve Austin	10:06	1
29	Henry O. Godwinn	22	The Undertaker	06:11	0
30	The Undertaker	27	"Stone Cold" Steve Austin	06:46	2

Austin was eliminated by Bret Hart, but snuck back in the ring while officials were distracted by a brawl between Terry Funk and Mankind on the other side of the ring.

Faarooq was eliminated when Ahmed Johnson (who had eliminated himself from the Rumble earlier on) came back into the ring with a 2×4 and went after Faarooq, causing him to go over the top rope.

In this match, "Stone Cold" Steve Austin tied the record for the most eliminations in a single royal rumble with 10. The previous record holder was Hulk Hogan, who eliminated 10 participants from the Royal Rumble 1989
