= Owen Hart and the British Bulldog =

Professional wrestling tag team

Tag team
- Name: Owen Hart and the British Bulldog
- Members: Owen Hart; British Bulldog
- Billed heights: Owen: 5 ft 10 in (1.78 m); Bulldog: 6 ft 1 in (1.85 m)
- Combined billed weight: 482 lb (219 kg)
- Hometown: Owen: Calgary, Alberta, Canada; Bulldog: Golborne, Wigan, England
- Debut: March 31, 1996 (WrestleMania XII) (fused) with Owen Hart and Yokozuna into Camp Cornette
- Disbanded: September 7, 1997
- Years active: 1996-1997

Owen Hart and the British Bulldog were a professional wrestling tag team in the World Wrestling Federation who existed independently and as a component of the villainous stables Camp Cornette and The Hart Foundation. Both members were part of the Hart wrestling family, and died in their 30s.

== History ==
=== Tag Team Champions (1996–1997) ===
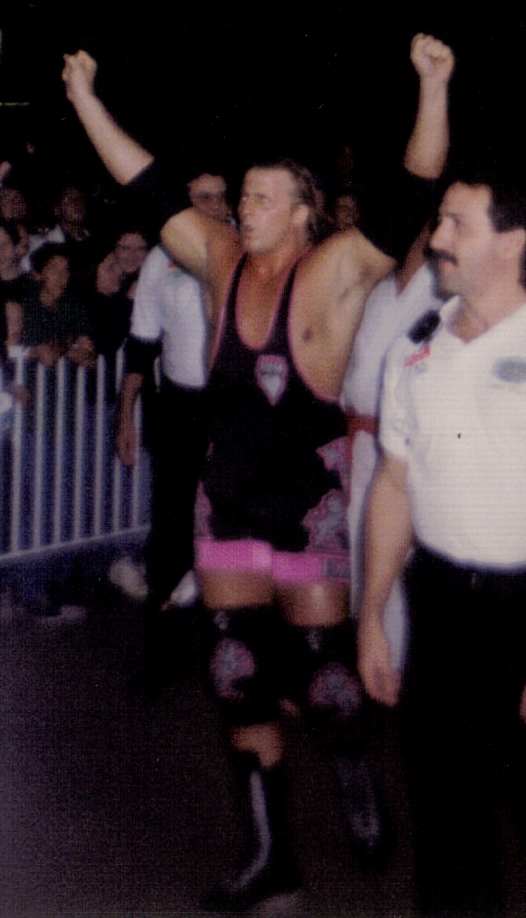
Owen Hart

The team of brothers-in-law, Hart and Bulldog debuted on March 31, 1996 at the twelfth WrestleMania event as members of James E. Cornette's Camp stable along with Vader and went on to defeat Yokozuna, Ahmed Johnson and Jake Roberts. At In Your House 7, Hart and Bulldog defeated Johnson and Roberts. They teamed up with Vader again at In Your House 9 to defeat Ahmed Johnson, Sycho Sid and Shawn Michaels. At In Your House 10, Hart and Bulldog defeated The Smoking Gunns to win the WWF Tag Team Championship.

After winning the Tag Team Championship, Hart and Bulldog started a feud with The Smoking Gunns whom they went on to defeat at In Your House 11 in a title match. At In Your House 12, they defended their title for a second time against (Fake) Razor Ramon and (Fake) Diesel. Following In Your House 12, Clarence Mason became their manager. They started a feud with Doug Furnas and Phil LaFon over the World Tag Team Championship after losing to them in a 4-on-4 Survivor Series match at Survivor Series. This led to a title defense at In Your House 13 against Furnas and LaFon which Hart and Bulldog lost by disqualification and thus retained the titles.

Following In Your House 13, Bulldog fired Mason because he lost a match to Crush under Mason's management. Hart tried to convince Bulldog that it was wrong to fire Mason but the decision stood. Hart and Bulldog started a feud with Legion of Doom (Hawk and Animal) against whom they made two title defenses but lost by disqualification. At WrestleMania 13, Hart and Bulldog defended the titles against Mankind and Vader (who tagged with Bulldog and Owen in a 6 man tag team match at Wrestlemania 12 the year before) in a match which ended in a double count-out.

=== Reformation of the Hart Foundation (1997) ===
At the 1997 Royal Rumble, Hart accidentally eliminated Bulldog from the Royal Rumble match. On February 26, 1997, Bulldog defeated his partner Hart in a tournament to be crowned the first-ever WWF European Champion in a 20-minute match. After this defeat, the tension between Bulldog and Hart began to build. After a title match against Headbangers, Hart and Bulldog got into a fight and Hart demanded that he wanted a title shot at Bulldog's European Championship.

On the March 31 edition of Raw is War, Hart and Bulldog fought to no contest when Bret Hart came into the ring and pleaded with the two not to fight any more, talking about their family ties. The three then re-formed The Hart Foundation with Jim Neidhart and Brian Pillman. On the April 28 edition of Raw is War, Owen defeated Rocky Maivia to win the WWF Intercontinental Championship, making both him and Smith double champions, as Smith held the European Championship.

On the May 26 edition of Raw is War, they lost the tag team titles to Steve Austin and Shawn Michaels. Hart, Bulldog and Neidhart defeated Sid and Legion of Doom at the 1997 King of the Ring. The entire Hart Foundation defeated Ken Shamrock, Goldust, Stone Cold Steve Austin and The Legion of Doom at In Your House 16 in a 5-on-5 tag team match. WWF Tag Team Championship was vacated afterwards. When the tag titles were vacated as a result of a neck injury to Stone Cold Steve Austin, Owen (who had inflicted the injury on Austin) and Bulldog got a chance to win the titles for a second time in a Fatal Four Way Elimination Tag Team match where they were defeated by The Headbangers. The match also involved Legion of Doom and The Godwinns. The team became the tenth longest reigning World Tag Team Champions, for 246 days.

== Championships and accomplishments ==
- World Wrestling Federation
  - WWF European Championship (1 time) – British Bulldog
  - WWF Intercontinental Championship (2 times) – Owen Hart
  - WWF Tag Team Championship (1 time)
- Pro Wrestling Illustrated
  - Ranked #84 of the top 100 tag teams of the "PWI Years" in 2003

== See also ==
- The Allied Powers
- The British Bulldogs
- The Hart Foundation
- Owen Hart and Yokozuna
