= In Your House 12: It's Time =

1996 World Wrestling Federation pay-per-view event

- Promotional poster featuring Bret Hart and Sycho Sid
- Promotion: World Wrestling Federation
- Date: December 15, 1996
- City: West Palm Beach, Florida
- Venue: West Palm Beach Auditorium
- Attendance: 5,708
- Buy rate: 97,000
- Tagline: Sharpshooter vs. Powerbomb

Pay-per-view chronology
← Previous; Survivor Series	Next → Royal Rumble

In Your House chronology
← Previous; Buried Alive	Next → Final Four

In Your House 12: It's Time was a 1996 professional wrestling pay-per-view (PPV) event produced by the World Wrestling Federation (WWF, renamed WWE in 2002) and presented by Milton Bradley's Karate Fighters. It was the 12th In Your House and took place on December 15, 1996, at the West Palm Beach Auditorium in West Palm Beach, Florida. The name of the show was taken from Vader's catchphrase and indicated that he was originally scheduled to have a high profile match on the show, but due to injuries, he was absent from the event.

The show featured five matches on the PPV broadcast, one match on the Free for All pre-show, and three dark matches. The main event of the show was the first championship defense of WWF Champion Sycho Sid, defending against former multi-time champion Bret Hart. With the launch of the WWE Network in 2014, this show became available on demand, but it did not include the Free for All pre-show match.

This event experienced technical broadcast difficulties during the broadcast. Those who ordered the event on DirecTV, Request TV, and Viewer's Choice were allowed to watch the broadcast again days later.

== Production ==
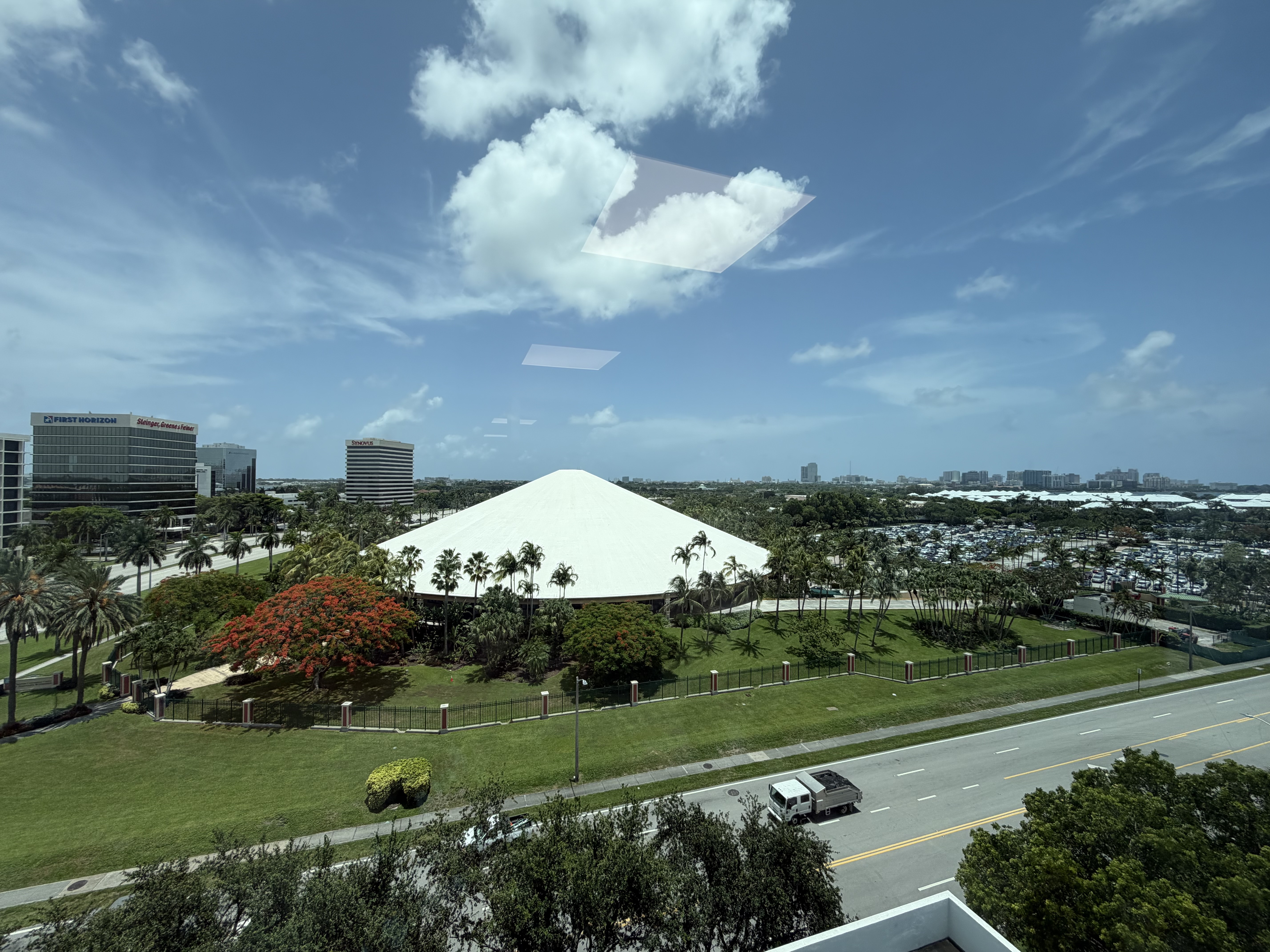
The 12th In Your House was held at the West Palm Beach Auditorium in West Palm Beach, Florida.

=== Background ===
In Your House was a series of monthly professional wrestling pay-per-view (PPV) events first produced by the World Wrestling Federation (WWF, renamed WWE in 2002) in May 1995. They aired when the promotion was not holding one of its then-five major PPVs (WrestleMania, King of the Ring, SummerSlam, Survivor Series, and Royal Rumble) and were sold at a lower cost. In Your House 12: It's Time was scheduled for December 15, 1996, at the West Palm Beach Auditorium in West Palm Beach, Florida. The name of the show was taken from Vader's catchphrase and indicated that he was originally scheduled to have a high profile match on the show, but due to injuries, he was absent from the event.

== Event ==
Other on-screen personnel
Role:	Name:
English commentators	Vince McMahon
English commentators	Jim Ross
English commentators	Jerry Lawler
English commentators	Shawn Michaels (WWF Championship match)
Spanish commentators	Carlos Cabrera
Spanish commentators	Hugo Savinovich
Spanish commentators	Arturo Rivera (AAA)
French commentators	Ray Rougeau
French commentators	Jean Brassard
Interviewers	Mr. Perfect
Interviewers	Kevin Kelly
Interviewers	Dok Hendrix
Ring announcer	Howard Finkel
Referees	Tim White
Referees	Jack Doan
Referees	Earl Hebner
Referees	Mike Chioda

During the WWF Tag Team Championship between champions Owen Hart and The British Bulldog (c) and the team of Razor Ramon and Diesel masked Mexican Lucha libre luchadors Pierroth and Cibernético appeared at ringside, representing AAA. They appeared briefly to signal the working relationship between the WWF and AAA. Before the match "Stone Cold" Steve Austin showed up and attacked the British Bulldog until WWF officials separate the two. After Hart and Bulldog separated the two Austin reappeared, clipped Bulldog's leg from behind and then ran off.

The Undertaker faced off against The Executioner in a Texas Deathmatch, which for this event was renamed an "Armageddon Rules" match. This match is a variant of a Last Man Standing match- a match where if a wrestler does not get up to his feet after a 10-count (like a boxing match), he loses. But in a Texas Deathmatch, in order for the referee to start a 10-count on a downed wrestler, that downed wrestler first has to be pinned to a standard 3-count by his opponent. During the match the Undertaker's long time rival Mankind came to the ring and attacked the Undertaker. While fighting the Undertaker threw Mankind through the fake house decorations by the entrance before returning to the ring. Afterwards Mankind was put in a straitjacket and dragged from the ring by security. In the end the Undertaker won when he pinned the Executioner, and then the Executioner was unable to get back to his feet after the post-3-count pin 10-count.

During the main event Shawn Michaels provided guest commentary during the match between Sycho Sid and Bret Hart. At one point "Stone Cold" Steve Austin ran to the ring and attacked Bret Hart, causing both Owen Hart and the British Bulldog to come to Bret's aid. The match was halted while Austin, Owen Hart and the Bulldog were ejected from the arena. During the match Hart and Michaels exchanged words, which drew Shawn Michaels away from the commentators' desk and up on the ring apron. Moments later Bret Hart collided with Michaels, allowing Sid to win the match. Following the match, Hart attacked Shawn Michaels in anger.

== Results ==
No.	Results	Stipulations	Times
1^{F}	Rocky Maivia defeated Salvatore Sincere (with Jim Cornette) by disqualification	Singles match	6:01
2	Flash Funk defeated Leif Cassidy	Singles match	10:34
3	Owen Hart and The British Bulldog (c) (with Clarence Mason) defeated Razor Ramon and Diesel	Tag team match for the WWF Tag Team Championship	10:45
4	Marc Mero (with Sable) defeated Hunter Hearst Helmsley (c) by countout	Singles match for the WWF Intercontinental Championship	13:12
5	The Undertaker defeated The Executioner (with Paul Bearer)	Armageddon Rules match	11:32
6	Sycho Sid (c) defeated Bret Hart	Singles match for the WWF Championship	17:04
7^{D}	Brakkus defeated Dr. X	Singles match	5:25
8^{D}	"Stone Cold" Steve Austin defeated Goldust (with Marlena)	Singles match	12:18
9^{D}	Shawn Michaels defeated Mankind (with Paul Bearer)	Singles match	6:55
(c) / – the champion(s) heading into the match; F / – the match was broadcast prior to the pay-per-view on Free for All; D / – this was a dark match
