= Smoking Gunns =

Professional wrestling tag team

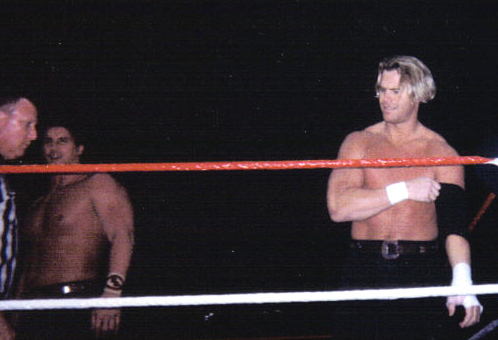
- The Smoking Gunns at a World Wrestling Federation event in 1996

Statistics
- Members: Bart Gunn; Billy Gunn
- Name(s): Smoking Gunns; Long Riders; Sunny and her Gunns
- Combined billed weight: 534 lb (242 kg; 38.1 st)
- Billed from: Austin, Texas
- Debut: April 1993
- Disbanded: October 1996
- Years active: 1993–1996

The Smoking Gunns were a professional wrestling tag team of kayfabe brothers Billy Gunn (Monty Sopp) and Bart Gunn (Mike Polchlopek). They portrayed cowboys in the World Wrestling Federation (WWF) from 1993 to 1996, where they held the WWF Tag Team Championship three times.

== History ==
=== International Wrestling Federation (1993) ===
Polchlopek and Sopp began teaming as the "Long Riders" in the International Wrestling Federation out of Orlando, Florida (not to be confused with the similarly-named promotion run by Killer Kowalski). Polchlopek wrestled as Brett Colt, while Sopp was known as Kip Winchester. They won the IWF World Tag Team Championship together twice before signing with the World Wrestling Federation.

=== World Wrestling Federation ===
==== Initial run (1993–1994) ====
The Smoking Gunns made their WWF debut on April 5, 1993 on the day after WrestleMania IX, defeating jobbers Barry Horowitz and Reno Riggins. Vignettes began airing on the WWF television promoting the debut of Smoking Gunns, beginning with the April 25 episode of Wrestling Challenge. Gunns made their televised debut in WWF on the May 15 episode of Mania as fan favorites by defeating Damien Demento and The Brooklyn Brawler. During their televised debut, Brett Colt was renamed Bart Gunn and Kip Winchester was renamed Billy Gunn. Their first pay-per-view appearance was at the King of the Ring event in an eight-man tag team match, in which they teamed with Steiner Brothers to defeat The Headshrinkers and Money Incorporated when Billy pinned Ted DiBiase. Their next big match came at SummerSlam, when they teamed up with Tatanka to defeat Bam Bam Bigelow and The Headshrinkers.

From their debut until January 1994, they would fire blanks in the arena with real guns, but then they received complaints from families that they were scaring children, which caused them to stop firing guns in the arenas.

Although they continued to wrestle as a team, they did not appear together again on a WWF pay-per-view for over a year. In the fall of 1994, the Gunns began a feud with the Heavenly Bodies (Tom Prichard and Jimmy Del Ray). The Bodies attacked the Smoking Gunns and destroyed their cowboy hats. In return, the Gunns grabbed the Bodies' robes and tore off the wings. The teams had a series of matches at house shows, but the feud did not end with a blow off match. Instead, the teams faced off as part of a 5-on-5 elimination match at the 1994 Survivor Series. Billy and Bart became a part of Guts and Glory (Lex Luger, Mabel, and Adam Bomb) in a loss to Ted DiBiase's Million Dollar Team (King Kong Bundy, Tatanka, Bam Bam Bigelow, and The Heavenly Bodies).

==== Tag Team Champions (1995–1996) ====
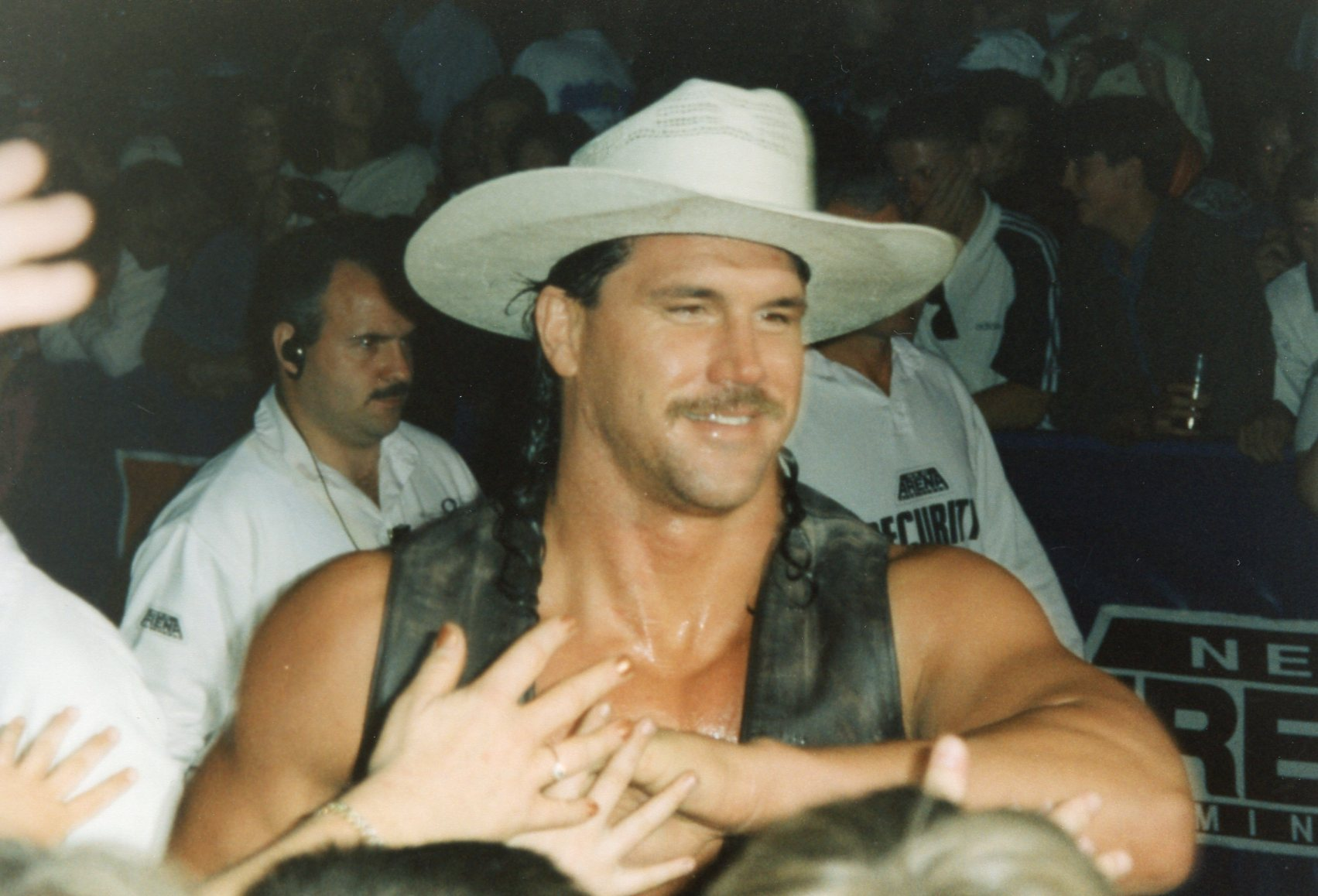
Bart Gunn in his cowboy attire

The Gunns were scheduled to compete in a tournament for the vacant Tag Team Championship after Shawn Michaels and Diesel, the champions, began feuding. Injuries prevented the Gunns from entering, however. One day after their replacements, Bob "Spark Plug" Holly and the 1-2-3 Kid, won the belts, the Gunns returned to win the title on January 23, 1995 episode of Monday Night Raw. By 1995, Billy and Bart both cut their long hair off. Billy shaved his mustache off. Gunns successfully defended the titles against Holly and Kid, The New Headshrinkers, Heavenly Bodies, and Men on a Mission. At WrestleMania XI, the Gunns faced Owen Hart and a mystery partner, who was revealed to be Yokozuna and lost the belts. Smokin' Gunns received a rematch for the titles against Owen Hart and Yokozuna at the inaugural In Your House event, but failed to win. Gunns would then briefly feud with The Blu Brothers, defeating them at SummerSlam.

On the September 25 episode of Raw, Gunns regained the Tag Team Championship from Hart and Yokozuna, beginning their second tag title reign. Gunns enjoyed a lengthy title reign, defeating challengers like Razor Ramon and 1-2-3 Kid at In Your House 4, and The Bodydonnas at the 1996 Royal Rumble. On February 15, 1996, the Smoking Gunns forfeited the titles when Billy was forced to undergo neck surgery. Bart would take a two-month absence and returned in April as he shaved off his mustache. Having matches against Steve Austin and Mankind.

Billy recovered quickly and returned on April 30. Around this time, the Gunns began to show signs of a heel turn and they won their final championship three months later by defeating The Godwinns at In Your House 8: Beware of Dog. During the match, Billy distracted Phineas I. Godwinn by kissing Sunny who came to the ring with the Godwinns. After the match, Sunny became The Gunn's manager and the team became tweeners with Billy acting more like a heel and Bart acting more like a face.

Sunny manipulated the Gunns, causing the brothers to argue. Sunny and Billy had an on-screen relationship, which bothered Bart. Meanwhile, Gunns continued their successful Tag Team Championship reign, defeating Godwinns in a rematch at King of the Ring. Gunns would then lose to Sunny's former clients Bodydonnas in a non-title match at In Your House 9: International Incident. At SummerSlam, Gunns successfully defended the titles against The Bodydonnas, The Godwinns and The New Rockers in a four-way elimination match. Gunns eventually lost the titles to Owen Hart and the British Bulldog in September 1996 at In Your House 10: Mind Games.

==== Split and feud (1996–1997) ====
Sunny left the team because she only wanted to be a manager for title holders (although she did not become Hart and Bulldog's manager, Clarence Mason did become their manager replacing Jim Cornette). Billy, frustrated with losing both the title and Sunny, began having miscommunications with Bart. Gunns failed to regain the Tag Team Championship from Owen Hart and British Bulldog in a rematch at In Your House 11: Buried Alive. On the October 27 episode of Superstars, Billy eventually turned against Bart by walking out of a match against New Rockers. Bart, still managed to win the match. This led Gunns to implode and feud with each other.

Billy and Bart competed in opposing teams in a Survivor Series elimination match at the Survivor Series' Free for All. Following that, on the December 16 episode of Raw, the two competed in a match. During the match, Bart hit Billy with a botched hangman on the top rope that gave Billy a neck injury. It was then rumored that at WrestleMania 13, the Gunns were supposed to face against each other but the match did not happen. The two former partners had a decisive match on the June 9, 1997 episode of Raw is War, where Billy, who had changed his character to "Rockabilly", defeated Bart.

=== Aftermath ===
Soon after, Bart went to wrestle for the National Wrestling Alliance (NWA), and when he returned to WWF in 1998, he was mainly involved in storylines with other NWA talent, and his opponents in the Brawl for All tournament, which he won. At Wrestlemania XV he lost to Butterbean in a boxing match. At the 1998 King of the Ring, Billy and Bart faced each other in a tag team match between the Midnight Express and the New Age Outlaws with the Outlaws winning. Bart was released in April 1999, before he could have another angle with Billy.

After the breakup, Billy was given the new gimmick of Rockabilly being managed by The Honky Tonk Man. It failed to catch on, however, and he became "Badd Ass" Billy Gunn and later won the WWF Intercontinental Championship, the WWF Hardcore Championship twice, and the 1999 King of the Ring tournament, in addition to eight more tag team titles. He formed the New Age Outlaws with Road Dogg. Gunn became a ten-time World Tag Team Champion with Road Dogg and Chuck Palumbo. He was released by the company in November 2004 after serving 11 years.

== Championships and accomplishments ==
- International Wrestling Federation
  - IWF Tag Tag Championship (3 times)
- World Wrestling Federation
  - WWF Tag Team Championship (3 times)
  - Raw Bowl
