= In Your House 10: Mind Games =

1996 World Wrestling Federation pay-per-view event

- Promotional poster featuring Shawn Michaels and Mankind
- Promotion: World Wrestling Federation
- Date: September 22, 1996
- City: Philadelphia, Pennsylvania
- Venue: CoreStates Center
- Attendance: 13,000
- Buy rate: 131,000

Pay-per-view chronology
← Previous; SummerSlam	Next → In Your House 11: Buried Alive

In Your House chronology
← Previous; In Your House 9: International Incident	Next → In Your House 11: Buried Alive

In Your House 10: Mind Games was a 1996 professional wrestling pay-per-view (PPV) event produced by the World Wrestling Federation (WWF, renamed WWE in 2002). It was the 10th In Your House and took place on September 22, 1996, at the CoreStates Center in Philadelphia, Pennsylvania. The name of the show was in reference to the rivalry between Shawn Michaels and Mankind.

The main event of the show saw Shawn Michaels retain the WWF Championship against Mankind in a match that Mankind regarded as the finest of his career. Also on the show, The Smoking Gunns (Bart Gunn and Billy Gunn) defended the WWF Tag Team Championship against Owen Hart and The British Bulldog. On the undercard, former Olympian Mark Henry made his WWF pay-per-view debut against Jerry "The King" Lawler.

In Your House 10: Mind Games was attended by 13,000 people and drew 120,000 buys (a 0.48 buy rate). In 2014, the event became available for streaming on the WWE Network.

== Production ==
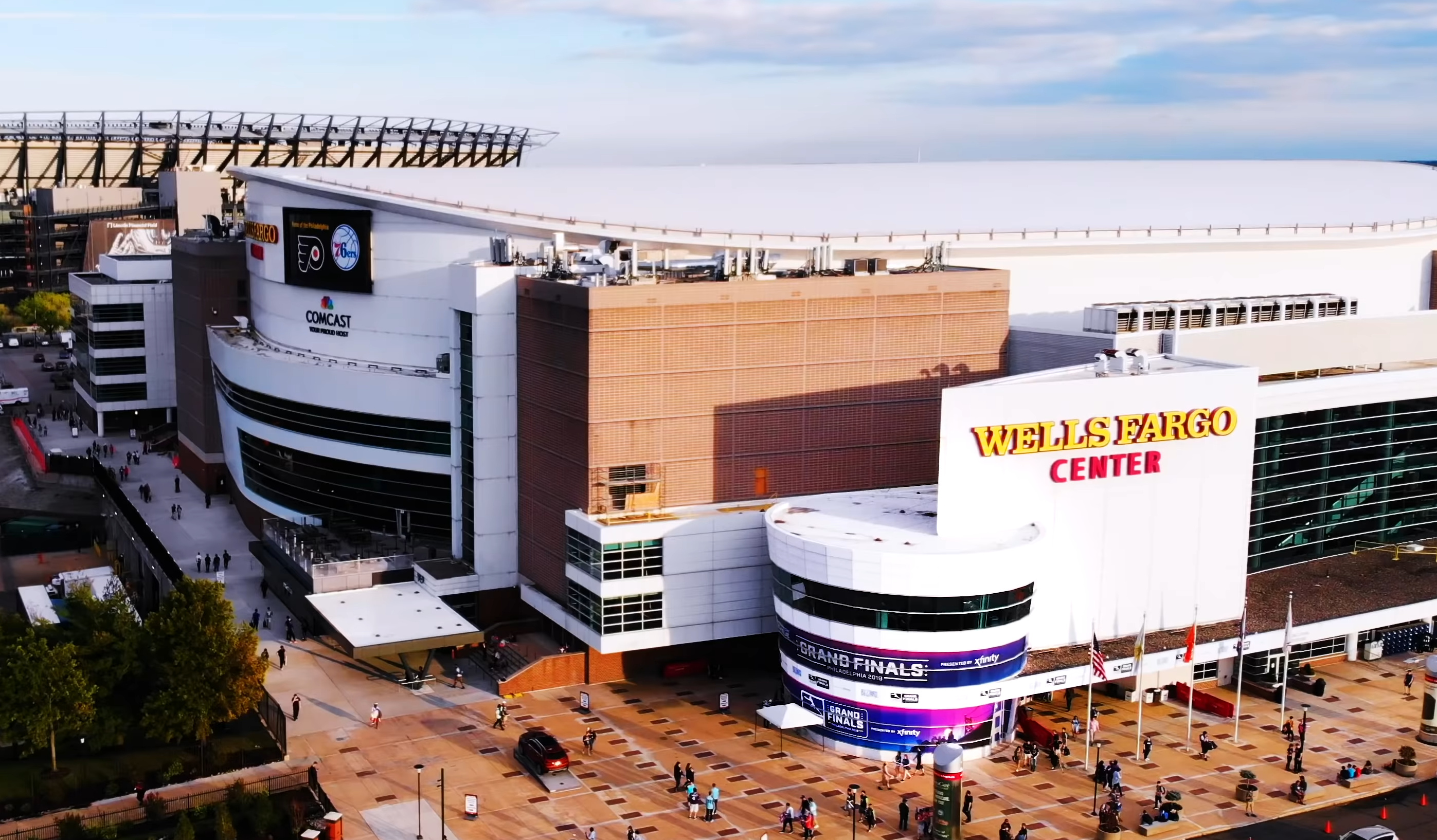
The 10th In Your House was held in Philadelphia, Pennsylvania at the CoreStates Center (pictured in 2019 after it had since been renamed as the Wells Fargo Center).

=== Background ===
In Your House was a series of monthly professional wrestling pay-per-view (PPV) events first produced by the World Wrestling Federation (WWF, renamed WWE in 2002) in May 1995. They aired when the promotion was not holding one of its then-five major PPVs (WrestleMania, King of the Ring, SummerSlam, Survivor Series, and Royal Rumble) and were sold at a lower cost. In Your House 10: Mind Games was scheduled for September 22, 1996, at the CoreStates Center in Philadelphia, Pennsylvania. The name of the show was a reference to the rivalry between Shawn Michaels and Mankind.

=== Storylines ===
In Your House 10: Mind Games featured professional wrestling matches involving different wrestlers from pre-existing scripted feuds, plots, and storylines that were played out on Monday Night Raw and other WWF television programming.

Mankind had defeated The Undertaker in a Boiler Room Brawl at SummerSlam the prior month when The Undertaker's long-time manager Paul Bearer betrayed him and aligned himself with Mankind. Mankind subsequently issued a challenge to WWF Champion Shawn Michaels.

== Event ==
The opening bout, which aired on the WWF Free for All broadcast, was a singles match in which Savio Vega defeated Marty Jannetty. After the match, Vega was attacked by Justin Bradshaw.

After the opening bout, Vince McMahon, Jim Ross, and Mr. Perfect welcomed viewers to the pay-per-view.

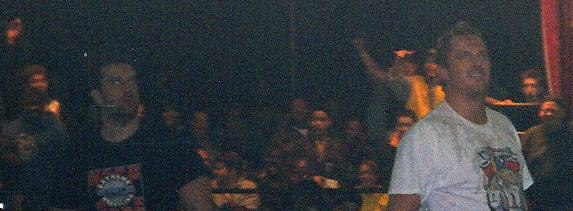
Extreme Championship Wrestling wrestlers Tommy Dreamer (left) and The Sandman (right) appeared at In Your House 10: Mind Games.

The second bout, and the first to air on the pay-per-view proper, was a Caribbean strap match between Bradshaw and Vega. This was Bradshaw's first pay-per-view match in the WWF. During the match, two wrestlers from the local Extreme Championship Wrestling (ECW) promotion, Tommy Dreamer and The Sandman, along with ECW promoter Paul Heyman, were shown at ringside, getting involved in the match before being thrown out of the CoreStates Center; this marked the beginning of the working relationship between the WWF and ECW. The match was won by Vega after he surreptitiously touched three corners of the ring and then was thrown into the fourth corner by Bradshaw, who inadvertently cost himself the match.

After the second bout, Vega was attacked in the locker room by Diesel and Razor Ramon, who Jim Ross had claimed would return to the WWF after having departed for World Championship Wrestling earlier that year (in reality, the characters of Diesel and Razor Ramon had been recast with new wrestlers portraying them).

The third bout was a singles match between Jim Cornette and José Lothario in an extension of the feud between Shawn Michaels (managed by Lothario) and Vader (managed by Cornette). Lothario won a short squash, pinning Cornette following a series of punches.

Following the third bout, Brian Pillman - who had claimed on Raw that he would interview Bret Hart (who had been largely absent since WrestleMania XII in March 1996) at the pay-per-view - instead introduced Owen Hart and "Stone Cold" Steve Austin, both of whom mocked Bret Hart.

A vignette then aired showing Mark Henry touring Philadelphia, visiting landmarks including the Statue of George Washington and the Liberty Bell.

Another vignette then aired in which Clarence Mason tricked a disorientated Jim Cornette into signing over the contracts of British Bulldog and Owen Hart to Mason.

The fourth bout was a tag team match in which the Smoking Gunns defended the WWF Tag Team Championship against Owen Hart and The British Bulldog. Prior to the match, the Smoking Gunns' manager, Sunny, unveiled a large poster of herself, only to find that the poster had been defaced by Bulldog and Hart. Bulldog and Hart won the match and the titles when a miscommunication between the Smoking Gunns allowed Bulldog to pin Bart Gunn following a running powerslam. Following the match, Sunny fired the Smoking Gunns.

The fifth bout was a singles match between Jerry Lawler and Mark Henry in what was Henry's second ever match and his first on pay-per-view. Henry won the match by forcing Lawler to submit using a Canadian backbreaker rack. After the match, Henry was attacked by Hunter Hearst-Helmsley, Leif Cassidy, and Marty Jannetty, but fought them off.

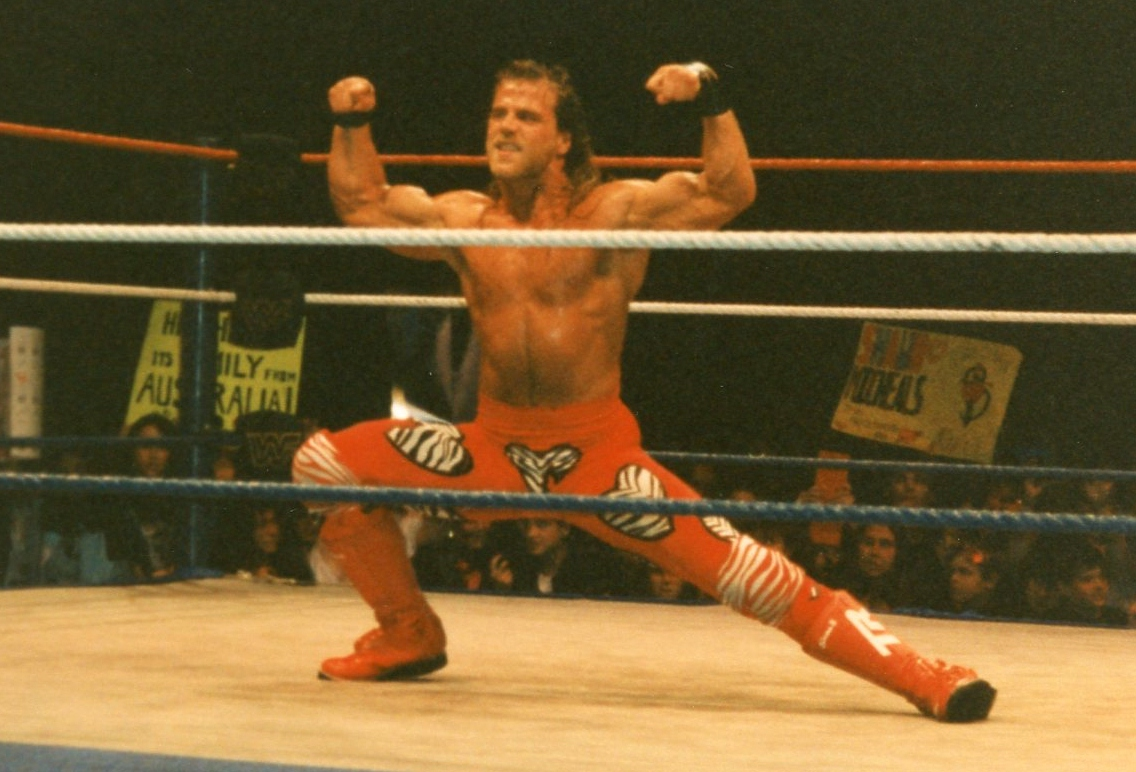
Shawn Michaels (pictured) successfully defended the WWF Championship against Mankind at In Your House 10: Mind Games.

The sixth bout was a "Final Curtain match" between Goldust and The Undertaker. The Undertaker won the match by pinfall following a chokeslam and a Tombstone Piledriver.

The seventh bout, and the final match to air on the pay-per-view, was a singles match in which Shawn Michaels defended the WWF Championship against Mankind. Memorable moments from the match included Mankind stabbing his knee to regain sensation after Michaels repeatedly targeted it, and Mankind tearing out hunks of his own hair in frustration after Michaels repeatedly kicked out of pin attempts. The match ended when Michaels used his Sweet Chin Music finishing move to drive a chair into Mankind's face and then attempted to pin Mankind, only for Vader to interfere and attack Michaels, resulting in Mankind being disqualified. This brought out Sycho Sid to chase Vader off. Subsequently, The Undertaker, Mankind's rival, appeared from a coffin at ringside and attacked Mankind.

The eighth bout was a singles match between Faarooq and Marc Mero. The match was won by Faarooq. This was a dark match that did not air on the pay-per-view broadcast.

The ninth bout was a singles match between Sycho Sid and Vader. The match was won by Sid. This was a dark match that did not air on the pay-per-view broadcast.

The tenth bout and the final match was a singles match between Hunter Hearst Helmsley and Jake Roberts. The match was won by Roberts. This was a dark match that did not air on the pay-per-view broadcast.

== Results ==
No.	Results	Stipulations	Times
1^{F}	Savio Vega defeated Marty Jannetty (with Leif Cassidy)	Singles match	05:22
2	Savio Vega defeated Justin Bradshaw (with Uncle Zebekiah)	Caribbean strap match	07:07
3	José Lothario defeated Jim Cornette by pinfall	Singles match	00:56
4	Owen Hart and The British Bulldog (with Clarence Mason) defeated The Smoking Gunns (Bart Gunn and Billy Gunn) (c) (with Sunny) by pinfall	Tag team match for the WWF Tag Team Championship	10:59
5	Mark Henry defeated Jerry Lawler by submission	Singles match	05:13
6	The Undertaker defeated Goldust (with Marlena) by pinfall	Final Curtain match	10:23
7	Shawn Michaels (c) (with José Lothario) defeated Mankind (with Paul Bearer) by disqualification	Singles match for the WWF Championship	26:25
8^{D}	Faarooq (with Sunny) defeated Marc Mero (with Sable)	Singles match	06:23
9^{D}	Sycho Sid defeated Vader (with Jim Cornette)	Singles match	09:10
10^{D}	Hunter Hearst Helmsley defeated Jake Roberts	Singles match	10:30
(c) / – the champion(s) heading into the match; F / – the match was broadcast prior to the pay-per-view on Free for All; D / – this was a dark match

== Other on-screen personnel ==
Commentators

- Vince McMahon
- Jim Ross
- Mr. Perfect

Interviewers

- Kevin Kelly
- Dok Hendrix

Ring announcer

- Howard Finkel

Referees

- Tim White
- Mike Chioda
- Jack Doan
- Earl Hebner
- Harvey Wippleman
