= In Your House 11: Buried Alive =

1996 World Wrestling Federation pay-per-view event

- Promotional poster featuring Mankind, Paul Bearer, and The Undertaker in a graveyard
- Promotion: World Wrestling Federation
- Date: October 20, 1996
- City: Indianapolis, Indiana
- Venue: Market Square Arena
- Attendance: 9,649
- Buy rate: 110,000
- Tagline(s): Deadman's Paradise; Dead or Alive! Death, Darkness and the Destruction of Mankind (bumper)

Pay-per-view chronology
← Previous; In Your House 10: Mind Games	Next → Survivor Series

In Your House chronology
← Previous; Mind Games	Next → It's Time

In Your House 11: Buried Alive was a 1996 professional wrestling pay-per-view (PPV) event produced by the World Wrestling Federation (WWF, renamed WWE in 2002). It was the 11th In Your House and took place on October 20, 1996, at the Market Square Arena in Indianapolis, Indiana. The name of the show was in reference to the main event, which was the WWF's first-ever Buried Alive match.

The event comprised five matches shown on pay-per-view as well as three dark matches. The aforementioned main event was between The Undertaker and Mankind. On the undercard, Sid faced Vader in a match to determine the #1 contender for the WWF Championship, and Marc Mero defended the Intercontinental Championship against Goldust. This was the first WWF pay-per-view in which the reigning world champion did not compete on-air on the show.

With the launch of the WWE Network in 2014, this show became available on demand, but did not include the three dark matches. However, the Shawn Michaels vs. Goldust match was included in the Attitude Era Unreleased DVD and Blu-ray release in 2017.

== Production ==
=== Background ===
In Your House was a series of monthly professional wrestling pay-per-view (PPV) events first produced by the World Wrestling Federation (WWF, renamed WWE in 2002) in May 1995. They aired when the promotion was not holding one of its then-five major PPVs (WrestleMania, King of the Ring, SummerSlam, Survivor Series, and Royal Rumble) and were sold at a lower cost. In Your House 11: Buried Alive was scheduled for October 20, 1996, at the Market Square Arena in Indianapolis, Indiana. The event's name was in reference to it featuring the first-ever Buried Alive match held by the promotion.

In The Mortician: The Story of Paul Bearer, Bruce Prichard revealed that the vignettes for the show were shot in Fairfield, Connecticut with The Undertaker, Mankind, and Paul Bearer doing "Graveyard Promos" to build up the hype of the event. On Something to Wrestle with Bruce Prichard, Prichard revealed that the original match was supposed to be a Graveyard match in an actual graveyard, but was moved to Market Square Arena for attendance viewing.

=== Storylines ===
The focal point of the event was the feud between The Undertaker and Mankind, that had been evolving since the summer of 1996 when The Undertaker's manager Paul Bearer turned on him and joined forces with Mankind. The two had already fought each other in a Boiler Room Brawl at the 1996 SummerSlam, during which Bearer sided with Mankind. In order to settle the storyline between the two, the "Buried Alive match" was devised, playing off the characters of both The Undertaker and Paul Bearer as the only way to win the match was to throw their opponent into an open grave and bury them alive.

== Event ==
During the event, Jim Ross, who was in the middle of a storyline where he turned heel as a commentator, grew increasingly irritated as his headset went through multiple technical difficulties throughout the event. Several times he would comment that the WWF was trying to keep him from voicing his opinions, all of which was part of the storyline.

Also notable is the debut of "Stone Cold" Steve Austin's "Hell Frozen Over" music, featuring the infamous shattered glass at the beginning. The shattered glass at the beginning along with the tune that originated from "Hell Frozen Over" would become part of Austin's character for the rest of his career.

During the main event, Crush, Bradshaw, Goldust, Hunter Hearst Helmsley, and The Executioner were helping Mankind to bury The Undertaker alive, only to be scared away by the sound of thunder after they were done. The Undertaker's hand would then emerge from the grave as the event ended. This would be the final time the Undertaker wore his traditional purple gloves attire, in a Coliseum Video exclusive right after the main event it was Paul Bearer introduced The Executioner as "the man dressed in red and black"

== Aftermath ==
The Undertaker would later "return from the grave" following the supposed burial at In Your House, and continue his storyline against Mankind and Paul Bearer, including a match at the subsequent In Your House show where he defeated the Executioner in an Armageddon Rules match. The feud with Mankind continued off and on for several years, including a very high-profile Hell in a Cell at the 1998 King of the Ring.

Owing to his victory over Vader, Sid earned a match against WWF World Heavyweight Champion Shawn Michaels in the main event of the 1996 Survivor Series, in which Sid won his first WWF World Heavyweight Championship.

== Results ==
No.	Results	Stipulations	Times
1^{D}	The Stalker defeated Justin Bradshaw (with Uncle Zebekiah)	Singles match	20:00
2	"Stone Cold" Steve Austin defeated Hunter Hearst Helmsley	Singles match	15:30
3	Owen Hart and The British Bulldog (c) (with Clarence Mason) defeated The Smoking Gunns (Billy Gunn and Bart Gunn)	Tag team match for the WWF Tag Team Championship	9:17
4	Marc Mero (c) (with Sable) defeated Goldust (with Marlena)	Singles match for the WWF Intercontinental Championship	11:38
5	Sycho Sid defeated Vader (with Jim Cornette)	Singles match to determine the #1 contender to the WWF Championship at Survivor Series	8:00
6	The Undertaker defeated Mankind (with Paul Bearer) by burying Mankind alive	Buried Alive match	18:25
7^{D}	The Godwinns (Henry O. Godwinn and Phineas I. Godwinn) defeated The New Rockers (Marty Jannetty and Leif Cassidy)	Tag team match	6:00
8^{D}	Shawn Michaels (c) (with Jose Lothario) defeated Goldust (with Marlena)	Singles match for the WWF Championship	13:35
(c) / – the champion(s) heading into the match; D / – this was a dark match

== Other on-screen personnel ==
Commentators

- Vince McMahon
- Jerry Lawler
- Jim Ross
- Mr. Perfect
- Shawn Michaels

Interviewers

- Dok Hendrix
- Kevin Kelly

Ring announcer

- Howard Finkel

Referees

- Tim White
- Mike Chioda
- Jack Doan
- Earl Hebner
