= SummerSlam (1996) =

World Wrestling Federation pay-per-view event

- Promotional poster featuring Shawn Michaels and Vader.
- Promotion: World Wrestling Federation
- Date: August 18, 1996
- City: Cleveland, Ohio
- Venue: Gund Arena
- Attendance: ~17,000
- Buy rate: 157,000
- Tagline: Opposites Attack!

Pay-per-view chronology
← Previous; In Your House 9: International Incident	Next → In Your House 10: Mind Games

SummerSlam chronology
← Previous; 1995	Next → 1997

The 1996 SummerSlam was a professional wrestling pay-per-view (PPV) event produced by the World Wrestling Federation (WWF, renamed WWE in 2002). It was the ninth annual SummerSlam and took place on August 18, 1996, at the Gund Arena in Cleveland, Ohio. Eight matches were contested at the event, including one match on the Free for All pre-show. The main event saw Shawn Michaels defeat Vader to retain WWF Championship.

== Background ==
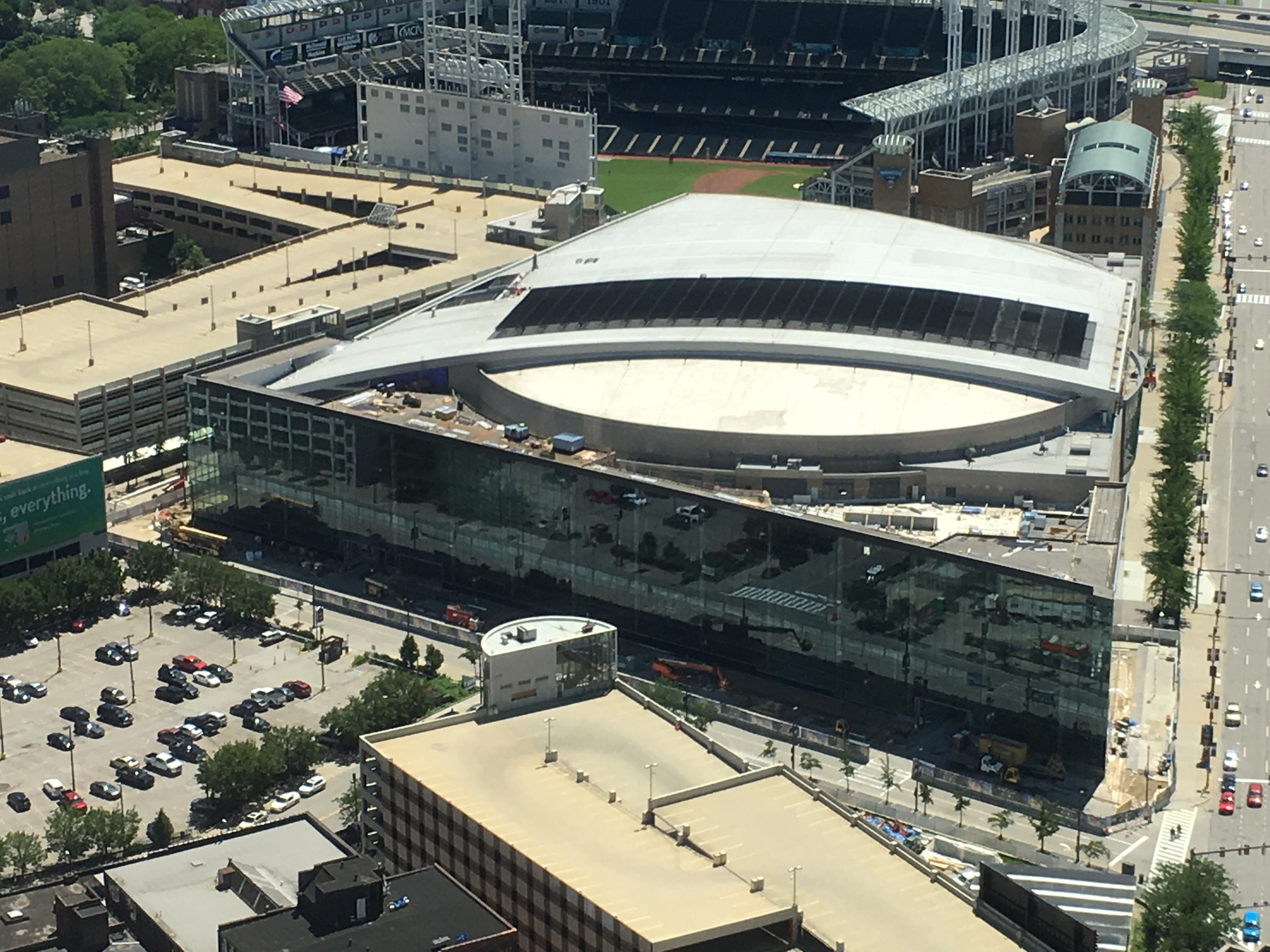
The ninth annual SummerSlam was held at the Gund Arena in Cleveland, Ohio.

SummerSlam is an annual professional wrestling pay-per-view (PPV) event produced every August by the World Wrestling Federation (WWF, renamed WWE in 2002) since 1988. Dubbed "The Biggest Party of the Summer", it is one of the promotion's original four PPVs, along with WrestleMania, Royal Rumble, and Survivor Series, referred to as the "Big Four", and was considered one of the "Big Five" PPVs with the addition of King of the Ring in 1993. It has since become considered the WWF's second biggest event of the year behind WrestleMania. The ninth SummerSlam was scheduled to be held on August 18, 1996, at the Gund Arena in Cleveland, Ohio.

Faarooq Asad had been scheduled to face Ahmed Johnson in a match for the WWF Intercontinental Championship at the event, but the match did not take place as Johnson was legitimately injured.

== Event ==
Other on-screen personnel
Role	Name
Commentators	Vince McMahon
Commentators	Jim Ross
Commentators	Mr. Perfect
Commentators	Mark Henry (Jake Roberts vs. Jerry Lawler)
Spanish Commentators	Carlos Cabrera
Spanish Commentators	Hugo Savinovich
Ring announcer	Howard Finkel
Referees	Mike Chioda
Referees	Jack Doan
Referees	Earl Hebner
Referees	Tim White
Referees	Harvey Wippleman
Interviewers	Todd Pettengill
Interviewers	Dok Hendrix

The opening bout, which aired on the "Free for All" portion of the broadcast, was a singles match between "Stone Cold" Steve Austin and Yokozuna. The match ended when the top rope broke as Yokozuna attempted a Banzai Drop (seated senton), enabling Austin to pin him for an upset victory.

Todd Pettengill hosted the "Bikini Beach Blast-Off" party during the Free for All, where a pool was set up for everyone. Guests included Sunny, Sable, Marc Mero, The Smoking Gunns, Marlena, Goldust, T.L. Hopper, Who, Jerry Lawler, The Bushwhackers, Aldo Montoya, Hunter Hearst Helmsley, and Shawn Michaels.

The second bout, and the first bout to air on the pay-per-view proper, was a singles match between Owen Hart and Savio Vega. During the match, Hart wore an orthopedic cast on his left arm. The match ended when Hart hit Vega with his cast then applied the Sharpshooter, defeating Vega by submission. Following the match, Justin Hawk Bradshaw attacked Vega.

The third bout saw WWF Tag Team Champions The Smoking Gunns defend their titles against The Bodydonnas, The Godwinns, and The New Rockers in a four-way elimination match. The Bodydonnas were the first team eliminated after Marty Jannetty tripped Zip, enabling Billy Gunn to pin him. The New Rockers were the next team eliminated when Henry O. Godwinn pinned Leif Cassidy following a Slop Drop (reverse DDT). The Smoking Gunns went on to win the match and retain their titles when Bart Gunn gave Phineas I. Godwinn a diving double axe handle, enabling Billy Gunn to pin him. Following the match, The Smoking Gunn's manager Sunny unveiled a large picture of herself.

The fourth bout was a singles match between The British Bulldog and Sycho Sid. Sid won the bout by pinning British Bulldog following a chokeslam and powerbomb.

The fifth bout was a singles match between Goldust and Marc Mero. Goldust won the bout by pinfall following a Curtain Call (lifting inverted DDT).

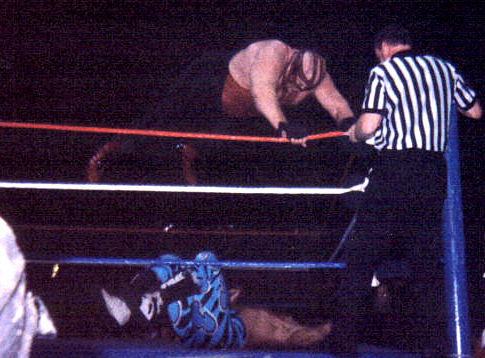
Vader (top) faced Shawn Michaels (bottom) for the WWF Championship in the main event of SummerSlam.

The sixth bout was a singles match between Jake "The Snake" Roberts and Jerry "The King" Lawler. Lawler won the bout by pinfall after hitting Roberts with a bottle of Jim Beam whiskey. Following the match, Lawler poured whisky onto Roberts until being stopped by Mark Henry.

The penultimate bout was the first ever Boiler Room Brawl, Mankind’s specialty match. The heel Mankind would be facing The Undertaker, whom Mankind had been harassing and assaulting at random for months. Mankind would often hang out in the darkness of an arena's boiler room (also known as a mechanical room), which was often hot and dusty, and where most of the arena's internal infrastructure was. This match first featured The Undertaker entering the Gund Arena's boiler room to seek out his arch-enemy, but Mankind struck first and they then proceeded to brawl for 30 minutes in the boiler room, the arena's corridors, the entrance ramp and finally the ring, where Paul Bearer was waiting for one of the wrestlers to take his urn, which was the winning objective of the match. Bearer turned on his long-time protege, The Undertaker, to align himself with Mankind.

The main event saw Shawn Michaels defend the WWF Championship against Vader. Vader originally won the match twice, first by countout (after he press-slammed Michaels onto the guard rail) and then by disqualification (when Michaels struck Vader repeatedly with Cornette's tennis racket), but because WWF championships can only change hands by pinfall or submission, Cornette demanded that the match restart both times. WWF President Gorilla Monsoon allowed this when Michaels agreed. Michaels went on to pin Vader after hitting him with a moonsault, thus retaining his title.

== Aftermath ==
The main event feud between Shawn Michaels and Vader was supposed to continue until that year's Survivor Series event with Vader capturing the WWF Championship from the champion Michaels. However, due to several alleged botches on the part of Vader during the match, Michaels voiced his frustrations about the match's execution to backstage where Vader was eventually stripped of his push. Michaels would eventually lose the title to Sycho Sid at Survivor Series, though would quickly win the title back from Sid in January 1997 and would then continue to refuse to do jobs for other top wrestlers, much as he had refused to lose to Vader.

== Results ==
No.	Results	Stipulations	Times
1^{F}	"Stone Cold" Steve Austin defeated Yokozuna	Singles match	1:52
2	Owen Hart (with Clarence Mason) defeated Savio Vega	Singles match	13:23
3	The Smoking Gunns (Billy Gunn and Bart Gunn) (c) (with Sunny) defeated The New Rockers (Marty Jannetty and Leif Cassidy), The Godwinns (Henry O. Godwinn and Phineas I. Godwinn) (with Hillbilly Jim), and The Bodydonnas (Skip and Zip)	Four-way elimination match for the WWF Tag Team Championship	12:18
4	Sycho Sid defeated The British Bulldog	Singles match	6:24
5	Goldust (with Marlena) defeated Marc Mero (with Sable)	Singles match	11:01
6	Jerry Lawler defeated Jake Roberts	Singles match	4:07
7	Mankind defeated The Undertaker (with Paul Bearer)	Boiler Room Brawl	26:40
8	Shawn Michaels (c) (with José Lothario) defeated Vader (with Jim Cornette)	Singles match for the WWF Championship	22:58
(c) / – the champion(s) heading into the match; F / – the match was broadcast prior to the pay-per-view on Free for All
