= Rick Bognar =

Canadian professional wrestler (1970–2019)

Personal information
- Born: Richard Bognar; January 16, 1970 Surrey, British Columbia, Canada
- Died: September 20, 2019 (aged 49) Calgary, Alberta, Canada

Professional wrestling career
- Ring name(s): Big Titan; Mega Mask; Razor Ramon; Rick Titan; Slice Ramirez; Ti Do
- Billed height: 6 ft 7 in (201 cm)
- Billed weight: 285 lb (129 kg)
- Trained by: Mr. Hito; Tokyo Joe Daigo
- Debut: 1988
- Retired: 2000

Richard Bognar (January 16, 1970 – September 20, 2019) was a Canadian professional wrestler, actor, and motivational speaker, best known as the "fake" Razor Ramon who debuted in the World Wrestling Federation (WWF) alongside the "fake" Diesel in a storyline following the move of the original Razor Ramon (Scott Hall) and Diesel (Kevin Nash) from the WWF to World Championship Wrestling (WCW). Bognar also wrestled as Big Titan in Frontier Martial-Arts Wrestling (FMW), where he won the FMW Brass Knuckles Heavyweight Championship and FMW Brass Knuckles Tag Team Championship with The Gladiator.

== Professional wrestling career ==
=== Early career (1988–1991) ===
Bognar wrestled his first match in Calgary in 1988 at the age of 18, after which he was rewarded with $25 and a six-pack of beer. According to Bognar, he "only got to wrestle in a couple matches a month" and worked as a bouncer for two years. He wrestled for several promotions on the Western Canada independent circuit using the ring names Rick Titan and Mega Mask. He also briefly wrestled for Stampede Wrestling in 1990.

=== Frontier Martial-Arts Wrestling (1991–1994) ===
In 1991, Bognar went to Japan to work for Atsushi Onita's Frontier Martial-Arts Wrestling (FMW) under the ring name Big Titan, after sending a videotape that drew the interest of Onita. He made his FMW in-ring debut on July 19, defeating Ricky Fuji. In November, he was paired with The Gladiator in the World's Strongest Tag Team Tournament, scoring a total of six points. On January 15, 1992, Titan defeated Onita to win the FMW Brass Knuckles Heavyweight Championship, his first professional wrestling championship. His reign lasted just fifteen days before he lost the title to Tarzan Goto on January 30. He later became a member of Fuji's stable, the original Team Canada, alongside The Gladiator and Dr. Luther. On January 18, 1994, Titan and The Gladiator defeated Onita and Katsutoshi Niyama in a tournament final to become the inaugural FMW Brass Knuckles Tag Team Champions. They lost the titles to Mr. Pogo and Hisakatsu Oya on April 29. Titan's last match for FMW would be on December 9, in a loss to The Gladiator.

=== Catch Wrestling Association (1994–1995) ===
Bognar made his debut for the Catch Wrestling Association (CWA) in Germany on December 17, 1994, unsuccessfully challenging Rambo for the CWA World Heavyweight Championship. There, he was also involved in a feud with Tony St. Clair. He left the promotion shortly after losing to Rambo in a match for the now-vacant CWA World Heavyweight Championship on December 19, 1995.

=== Wrestle and Romance / Wrestle Association R (1995–1996) ===
From June 1995 to August 1996, Bognar wrestled for WAR as Big Titan and Ti Do, where he feuded with Genichiro Tenryu for the majority of his tenure.

=== Extreme Championship Wrestling (1996) ===
Bognar, as Big Titan, appeared for Extreme Championship Wrestling (ECW) at Big Ass Extreme Bash on March 8 and 9. He defeated Judge Dredd on the first night, but lost to Sabu the next night. On May 18, under the name Slice Ramirez, he teamed with J.T. Smith and Little Guido to defeat The Dudley Boyz (Buh Buh Ray Dudley and D-Von Dudley) and Hack Meyers.

=== World Wrestling Federation (1996–1997) ===
With help from Bret Hart, Bognar received a tryout match for the World Wrestling Federation (WWF) on August 19, 1996, where he defeated Frank Stalletto.

In September 1996, play-by-play announcer Jim Ross introduced Bognar as "Razor Ramon" and Glenn Jacobs as "Diesel" as part of a storyline mocking the departure of former employees Scott Hall and Kevin Nash, who had left the WWF to join World Championship Wrestling (WCW). The storyline was also an attempt to turn Ross into a heel. However, both the Jim Ross heel turn and fake Razor Ramon and Diesel storylines were poorly received. Ramon and the second Diesel feuded with Savio Vega after attacking him on September 22 at In Your House 10: Mind Games. The feud culminated at Survivor Series on November 17, where Ramon teamed with Diesel, Faarooq and Vader against Flash Funk, Jimmy Snuka, Vega and Yokozuna in a four-on-four Survivor Series tag team elimination match that ended in a double disqualification. Ramon fought against Steve Austin, Jake Roberts and Bret Hart. His biggest victory was over Marc Mero. At In Your House 12: It's Time on December 15, he and Diesel unsuccessfully challenged Owen Hart and The British Bulldog for the WWF Tag Team Championship. Bognar's final televised appearance was in the Royal Rumble match at the titular event on January 19, 1997, where he was the first wrestler eliminated by Ahmed Johnson. He wrestled one more match at a house show on February 20, defeating Ricky Rockett.

=== Asistencia Asesoría y Administración (1997) ===
On January 31, 1997, Bognar, as Razor Ramon, made his debut for the Mexican promotion Asistencia Asesoría y Administración (AAA), where he teamed with the second Diesel and Jake Roberts to defeat Cibernético, Perro Aguayo and Pierroth Jr., after Pierroth turned on his team. They remained with the promotion until May, where they often teamed with Fuerza Guerrera and Pentagón against Cibernético, El Canek and Latin Lover.

=== United States Wrestling Association (1997) ===
In April 1997, Bognar debuted for the United States Wrestling Association (USWA), where he initially continued his partnership with the second Diesel. However, they eventually split up and began a feud that culminated in a "loser leaves town" match on June 24, which Ramon won. Jacobs was ultimately repackaged as Kane, the brother of The Undertaker. Shortly after, Bognar discarded his Razor Ramon character and wrestled as Rick Titan before leaving the USWA in August.

=== Puerto Rico (1997) ===
In October 1997, he made his debut in Puerto Rico's World Wrestling Council using the Razor Ramon character. He feuded with Carlos Colon. This would be the last time he used the Razor Ramon gimmick. He left Puerto Rico that November.

=== New Japan Pro-Wrestling (1998–1999) ===
In 1998, Titan returned to Japan and joined New Japan Pro-Wrestling (NJPW) as a member of the nWo Japan stable. During a match against Shinya Hashimoto on February 15, he injured his neck after a botched DDT, resulting in a hairline fracture of his C5 and C6 vertebrae. Despite this, Titan continued to wrestle, participating in a tournament for the IWGP Tag Team Championship with V.K. Wallstreet in June, but lost to Kensuke Sasaki and Kazuo Yamazaki in the first round. In August, he took part in the G1 Climax, losing to Tadao Yasuda in the first round. He wrestled his final match for NJPW during the "Hyper Battle" tour on March 2, 1999, teaming with Hiro Saito and Keiji Muto in a loss to Team 2000 (Akira, Masahiro Chono and nWo Sting).

=== Late career (1999–2000, 2012) ===
After his tenure in Japan, Titan returned to the revamped Stampede Wrestling in November 1999, where he wrestled his final match on June 9, 2000, losing to Vic Viper. That same year, he would retire from in-ring competition.

However, Bognar made a one-night return to wrestling on September 29, 2012, for CNWA Mega Expo, teaming with Raam Dante to defeat KC Andrews and Kenny Doll. He was also involved in training Jinder Mahal.

== Other media ==
In 1998, Bognar appeared in the Honey, I Shrunk the Kids: The TV Show episode "Honey, Meet the Barbarians" as the "Meanest Barbarian". He also appeared in the 2015 film Painkillers as "Sasquatch".

In July 2010, Bognar released a book titled "Wrestling with Consciousness".

== Personal life ==
Bognar was born in Vancouver on January 16, 1970. He attended Earl Marriott Secondary School in Surrey, British Columbia, and then Mount Royal College in Calgary. After retiring from professional wrestling, he studied business and psychology at Kwantlen Polytechnic University and became a motivational speaker (calling it transformational speaker).

On September 20, 2019, Bognar died from a sudden heart attack at the age of 49.

== Championships and accomplishments ==
- Canadian Rocky Mountain Wrestling
  - CRMW International Championship (2 times)
- Frontier Martial-Arts Wrestling
  - FMW Brass Knuckles Heavyweight Championship (1 time)
  - FMW Brass Knuckles Tag Team Championship (1 time) – with The Gladiator
  - FMW Brass Knuckles Tag Team Championship Tournament (1994) – with The Gladiator
- Pro Wrestling Illustrated
  - PWI ranked him #124 of the top 500 singles wrestlers in the PWI 500 in 1995
- Wrestling Observer Newsletter
  - Worst Gimmick (1996) as Fake Razor Ramon
  - Most Disgusting Promotional Tactic (1996) Fake Razor Ramon gimmick

== See also ==
- List of premature professional wrestling deaths
