= In Your House 9: International Incident =

1996 World Wrestling Federation pay-per-view event

- Promotional poster featuring The British Bulldog and Shawn Michaels
- Promotion: World Wrestling Federation
- Date: July 21, 1996
- City: Vancouver, British Columbia, Canada
- Venue: General Motors Place
- Attendance: 14,804
- Buy rate: 99,000
- Tagline: Two Hours of Hard-Hitting, High-Flying, Heart-Stopping, Piledriving Action!!

Pay-per-view chronology
← Previous; King of the Ring	Next → SummerSlam

In Your House chronology
← Previous; Beware of Dog	Next → Mind Games

WWE in Canada chronology
← Previous; In Your House 4	Next → In Your House 16: Canadian Stampede

In Your House 9: International Incident was a 1996 professional wrestling pay-per-view (PPV) event produced by the American promotion World Wrestling Federation (WWF, renamed WWE in 2002). It was the ninth In Your House and took place on July 21, 1996, at General Motors Place in Vancouver, British Columbia, Canada. The show's name was in reference to it taking place in Canada, which was the second In Your House in the country after In Your House 4 in October 1995 in Winnipeg, Manitoba.

Seven matches were held at the event, including one taped for Free for All and one dark match after the show. The main event of the show was a six-man tag team match between the trio referred to as The People's Posse (Shawn Michaels, Sycho Sid, and Ahmed Johnson) against "Camp Cornette" (Vader, Owen Hart, and British Bulldog). With the launch of the WWE Network in 2014, this show became available on demand, except for the Free for All match.

== Production ==
=== Background ===
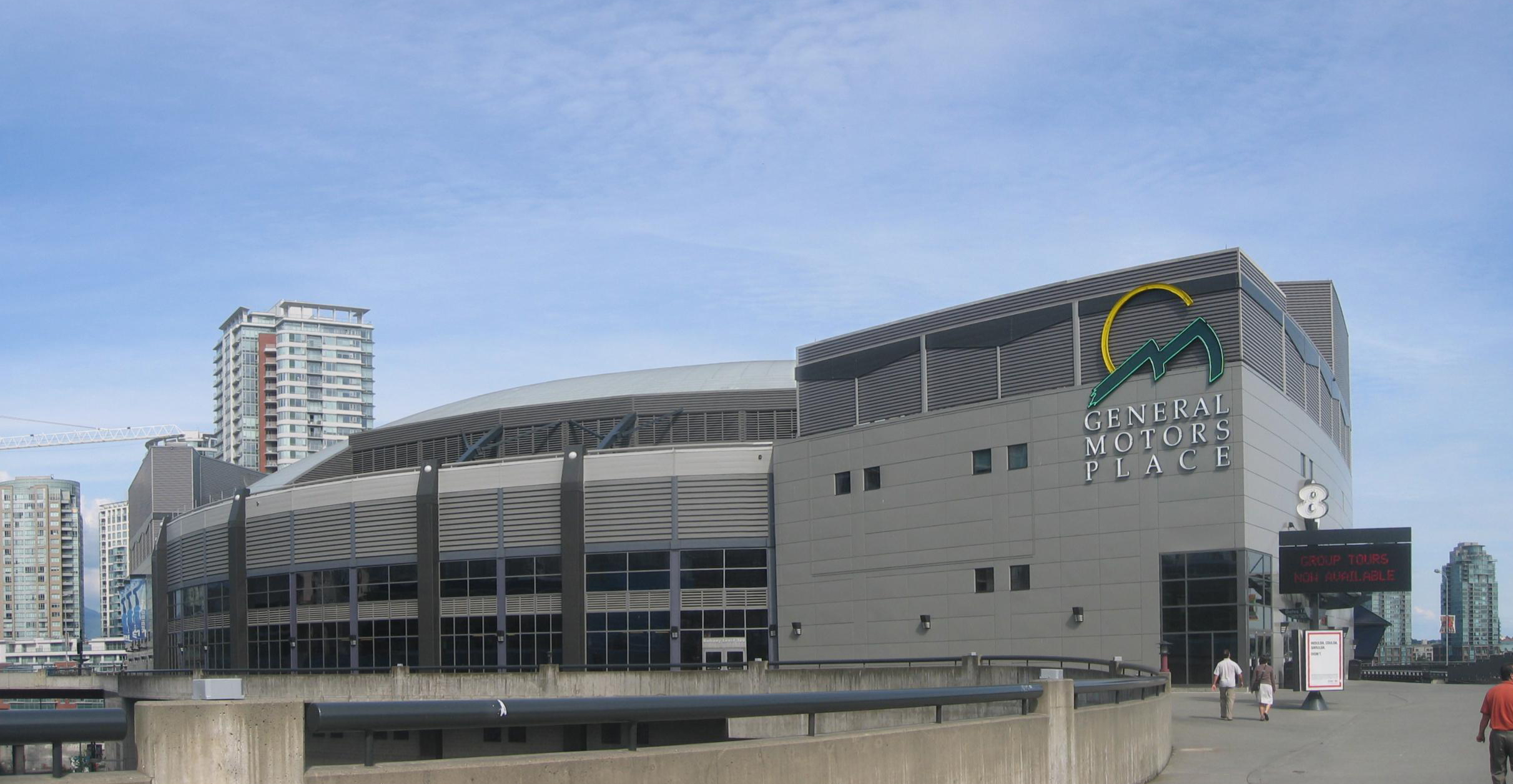
The ninth In Your House was held at General Motors Place in Vancouver, British Columbia, Canada.

In Your House was a series of monthly professional wrestling pay-per-view (PPV) events first produced by the American company World Wrestling Federation (WWF, renamed WWE in 2002) in May 1995. They aired when the promotion was not holding one of its then-five major PPVs (WrestleMania, King of the Ring, SummerSlam, Survivor Series, and Royal Rumble) and were sold at a lower cost. In Your House 9: International Incident was scheduled for July 21, 1996, at General Motors Place in Vancouver, British Columbia, Canada. The name of the show was a reference to it being held in Canada, which was the second In Your House in the country after In Your House 4 in October 1995 in Winnipeg, Manitoba.

=== Storylines ===
In Your House 9: International Incident featured professional wrestling matches involving different wrestlers from pre-existing scripted feuds, plots, and storylines that were played out on Monday Night Raw and other WWF television programs.

== Event ==
Other on-screen personnel
Role:	Name:
Commentator	Vince McMahon
Commentator	Jim Ross
Commentator	Jerry "The King" Lawler
Interviewer	Dok Hendrix
Interviewer	Mr. Perfect
Interviewer	Todd Pettengill
Ring announcer	Howard Finkel
Referee	Tim White
Referee	Mike Chioda
Referee	Jack Doan
Referee	Earl Hebner
Referee	Harvey Wippleman

Mankind was originally scheduled to face Jake Roberts in the second match of the PPV but Roberts had to be replaced with Henry O. Godwinn on the night of the show. During the match commentator Jerry Lawler made several jokes at Jake Roberts' expense, stating that Roberts had fallen off the wagon, began drinking etc. referencing Roberts' troubled past that he had freely talked about after returning to the WWF. The commentary was meant to build tension between Roberts and Lawler for a future match, not a comment of Roberts' sobriety at the time. During a subsequent bout between The Undertaker and Goldust, Mankind revealed that he had not gone to the back after his win over Henry Godwinn, but instead climbed under the ring while the arena was dark. During the match he emerged through the floor of the ring, grabbed the Undertaker by the foot and then dragged him down under the ring with him. This led to a disqualification victory for the Undertaker after the interference. Later on, as Mankind was back in the ring, the Undertaker emerged through another hole in the floor and attacked Mankind. The two brawled all the way to the back of the arena, into the building's boiler room. The main event saw the Camp Cornette team victorious as Vader pinned Shawn Michaels following interference from Jim Cornette himself.

The show was originally supposed to have Ultimate Warrior team up with Shawn Michaels and Ahmed Johnson against the heel trio of Vader, Owen Hart, and The British Bulldog but in the weeks prior to the show Ultimate Warrior and the WWF had a disagreement (resulting in Warrior no-showing several house shows) and the Warrior left the company. The WWF brought Sycho Sid back after several months absence, turning his character face as he saved Michaels and Johnson from a three-on-two attack during an episode of Monday Night Raw. Leading up to the show manager Jim Cornette bragged that he was so sure of his team being victorious that he would give everyone who bought the Pay Per View their money back if they lost.

== Aftermath ==
Shawn Michaels successfully defended the WWF World Heavyweight Championship against Vader in the main event of the 1996 SummerSlam event one month later. At the same event Mankind defeated the Undertaker in a Boiler Room Brawl when the Undertaker's manager Paul Bearer sided with Mankind.

== Results ==
No.	Results	Stipulations	Times
1^{F}	Justin Bradshaw (with Uncle Zebekiah) defeated Savio Vega by pinfall	Singles match	4:44
2	The Bodydonnas (Skip and Zip) defeated The Smoking Gunns (Bart Gunn and Billy Gunn) (with Sunny) by pinfall	Tag team match	13:05
3	Mankind defeated Henry O. Godwinn (with Hillbilly Jim) by submission	Singles match	6:54
4	"Stone Cold" Steve Austin defeated Marc Mero (with Sable) by pinfall	Singles match	10:48
5	The Undertaker (with Paul Bearer) defeated Goldust (with Marlena) by disqualification	Singles match	12:07
6	Camp Cornette (The British Bulldog, Owen Hart, and Vader) (with Jim Cornette) defeated The People's Posse (Ahmed Johnson, Shawn Michaels, and Sycho Sid) (with José Lothario) by pinfall	Six-man tag team match	24:32
7^{D}	Hunter Hearst Helmsley defeated "Stone Cold" Steve Austin by countout	Singles match	11:15
F / – the match was broadcast prior to the pay-per-view on Free for All; D / – this was a dark match

== See also ==
- Professional wrestling in Canada
