= Survivor Series (1996) =

World Wrestling Federation pay-per-view event

- Promotional poster featuring Bret Hart, Shawn Michaels, Sycho Sid, and "Stone Cold" Steve Austin
- Promotion: World Wrestling Federation
- Date: November 17, 1996
- City: Manhattan, New York
- Venue: Madison Square Garden
- Attendance: 18,647
- Buy rate: 160,000
- Tagline: Back to Attack

Pay-per-view chronology
← Previous; In Your House 11: Buried Alive	Next → In Your House 12: It's Time

Survivor Series chronology
← Previous; 1995	Next → 1997

The 1996 Survivor Series was a professional wrestling pay-per-view (PPV) event produced by the World Wrestling Federation (WWF, renamed WWE in 2002) and presented by Milton Bradley's Karate Fighters. It was the 10th annual Survivor Series event and took place on November 17, 1996, from Madison Square Garden in the New York City borough of Manhattan, New York. The event centered on the Survivor Series match, a tag team elimination match that pits teams of multiple wrestlers against each other.

The pay-per-view broadcast consisted of six matches, as well as one on the Free for All pre-show. The main event was a standard wrestling match for the WWF Championship. Shawn Michaels defended the title against Sycho Sid, who won the title by pinning Michaels after hitting him with a television camera and performing a Powerbomb. The match was notable for the crowd's unexpected support for the heel Sid instead of babyface Michaels, an "edginess" that would influence the dawn of WWF's Attitude Era.

The undercard featured three Survivor Series matches: Faarooq, Vader, Razor Ramon, and Diesel versus Flash Funk, Savio Vega, Yokozuna, and Jimmy Snuka, who had been inducted into the WWF Hall of Fame the night before; Marc Mero, Rocky Maivia, Jake Roberts, and The Stalker versus Crush, Jerry Lawler, Hunter Hearst Helmsley, and Goldust; and Doug Furnas, Henry O. Godwinn, Phil Lafon, and Phineas I. Godwinn versus The British Bulldog, Leif Cassidy, Marty Jannetty, and Owen Hart. Also on the undercard was The Undertaker versus Mankind in a standard wrestling match and Bret Hart versus "Stone Cold" Steve Austin in a standard wrestling match to determine the number one contender to the WWF Championship.

The event is notable for the debut of Dwayne Johnson, who wrestled under his original ring name of Rocky Maivia at this event, and would later become known as The Rock. The event also marked Yokozuna's final appearance.

== Production ==
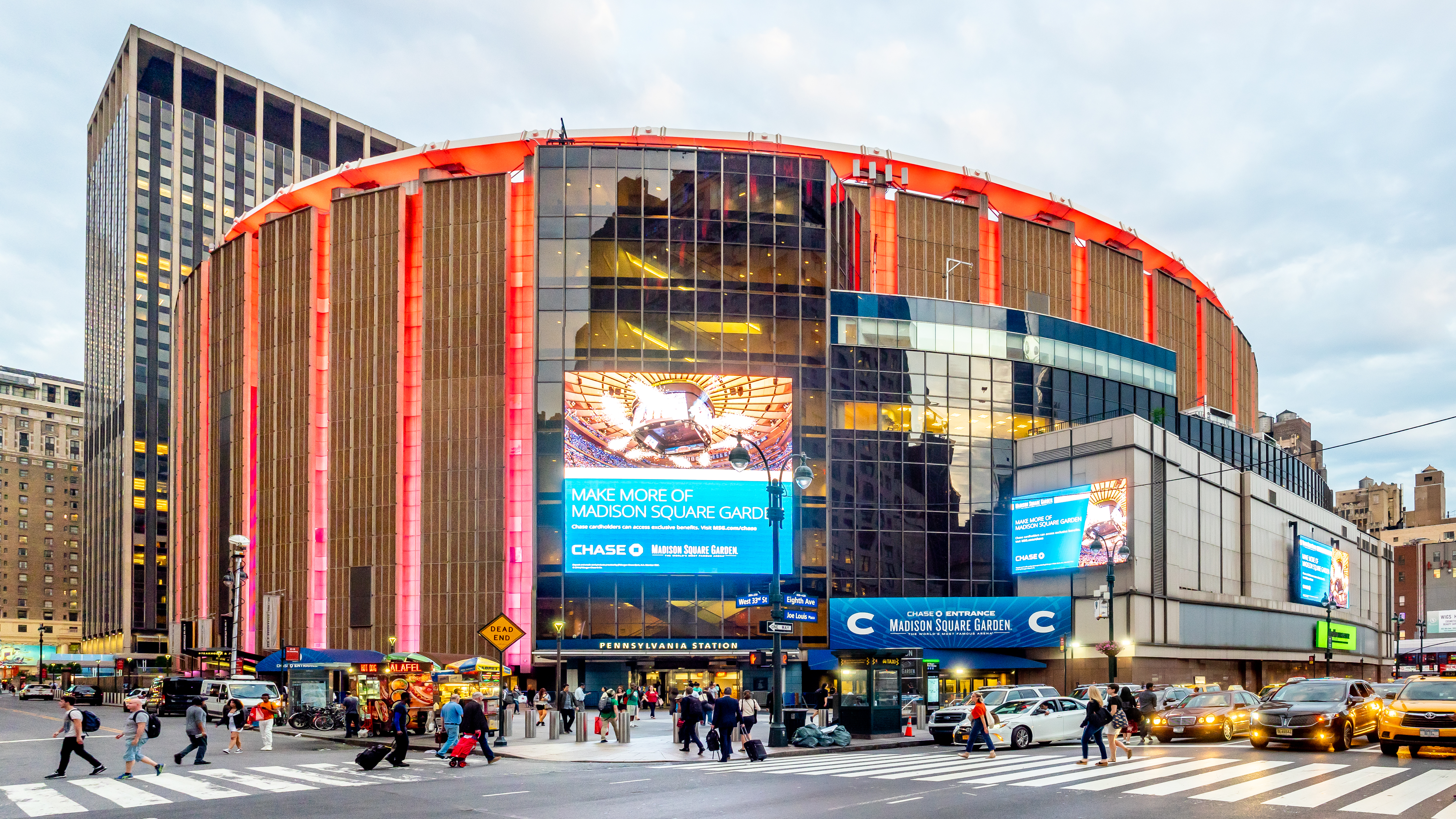
The 10th annual Survivor Series event was held at Madison Square Garden in the New York City borough of Manhattan, New York.

=== Background ===
Survivor Series is an annual professional wrestling pay-per-view (PPV) event, produced every November by the World Wrestling Federation (WWF, renamed WWE in 2002) since 1987, held around Thanksgiving in the United States. In what has become the second longest running PPV event in history (behind WWE's WrestleMania), it is one of the promotion's original four PPVs, along with WrestleMania, SummerSlam, and Royal Rumble, referred to as the "Big Four", and was considered one of the "Big Five" PPVs with the addition of King of the Ring in 1993. The event is traditionally characterized by having Survivor Series matches, which are tag team elimination matches that typically pits teams of four or five wrestlers against each other. The 10th Survivor Series event was scheduled to be held on the Sunday before Thanksgiving on November 17, 1996, from Madison Square Garden in the New York City borough of Manhattan, New York.

=== Storylines ===
Survivor Series consisted of professional wrestling matches involving wrestlers from pre-existing feuds and storylines that played out on Monday Night Raw — WWF's primary television program. Wrestlers portrayed a face or a heel as they followed a series of events that built tension, and culminated in a wrestling match or series of matches.

== Results ==
No.	Results	Stipulations	Times
1^{F}	Aldo Montoya, Bart Gunn, Bob Holly, and Jesse James defeated Billy Gunn, Justin Bradshaw, Salvatore Sincere, and The Sultan (with The Iron Sheik and Uncle Zebekiah)	4-on-4 Survivor Series match^{1}	10:46
2	Doug Furnas, Henry O. Godwinn, Phil Lafon, and Phineas I. Godwinn (with Hillbilly Jim) defeated The British Bulldog, Leif Cassidy, Marty Jannetty, and Owen Hart (with Clarence Mason)	4-on-4 Survivor Series match^{2}	20:41
3	The Undertaker defeated Mankind by pinfall	Singles match Paul Bearer was suspended above the ring in a shark cage.	14:54
4	Jake Roberts, Marc Mero, Rocky Maivia, and The Stalker (with Sable) defeated Crush, Goldust, Jerry Lawler, and Hunter Hearst Helmsley (with Marlena)	4-on-4 Survivor Series match^{3}	23:44
5	Bret Hart defeated "Stone Cold" Steve Austin by pinfall	Singles match to determine the #1 contender to the WWF Championship	28:36
6	Diesel, Faarooq, Razor Ramon, and Vader (with Clarence Mason, J.C. Ice, Wolfie D, and Jim Cornette) vs. Flash Funk, Jimmy Snuka, Savio Vega, and Yokozuna ended in a no contest	4-on-4 Survivor Series match^{4}	9:48
7	Sycho Sid defeated Shawn Michaels (c) (with José Lothario) by pinfall	Singles match for the WWF Championship	20:02
(c) / – the champion(s) heading into the match; F / – the match was broadcast prior to the pay-per-view on Free for All

=== Survivor Series matches ===
^1

Eliminated	Wrestler	Eliminated by	Method	Time
1	Aldo Montoya	The Sultan	Submission	3:55
2	Salvatore Sincere	Bart Gunn	Pinfall	6:55
3	Bob Holly	Justin Bradshaw	Pinfall	8:35
4	Justin Bradshaw	Jesse James	Pinfall	8:46
5	The Sultan	Jesse James	Pinfall	9:44
6	Jesse James	Billy Gunn	Pinfall	9:59
7	Billy Gunn	Bart Gunn	Pinfall	10:46
Sole Survivor:	Bart Gunn			

^2

Eliminated	Wrestler	Eliminated by	Method	Time
1	Marty Jannetty	Henry O. Godwinn	Pinfall	8:12
2	Henry O. Godwinn	Owen Hart	Pinfall	8:18
3	Phineas I. Godwinn	The British Bulldog	Pinfall	9:04
4	Leif Cassidy	Phil Lafon	Pinfall	13:43
5	The British Bulldog	Phil Lafon	Pinfall	17:22
6	Owen Hart	Doug Furnas	Pinfall	20:41
Survivors:	Doug Furnas and Phil Lafon			

^3

Eliminated	Wrestler	Eliminated by	Method	Time
1	Jerry Lawler	Jake Roberts	Pinfall	10:01
2	The Stalker	Goldust	Pinfall	12:44
3	Hunter Hearst Helmsley	Marc Mero	Pinfall	19:20
4	Marc Mero	Crush	Pinfall	20:36
5	Jake Roberts	Crush	Pinfall	20:54
6	Crush	Rocky Maivia	Pinfall	23:12
7	Goldust	Rocky Maivia	Pinfall	23:44
Sole Survivor:	Rocky Maivia			

^4

Eliminated	Wrestler	Eliminated by	Method	Time
1	Savio Vega	Diesel	Pinfall	8:39
2	Razor Ramon	Jimmy Snuka	Pinfall	9:28
3	Faarooq	N/A	Disqualification	9:48
4	Vader	N/A	Disqualification	9:48
5	Diesel	N/A	Disqualification	9:48
6	Flash Funk	N/A	Disqualification	9:48
7	Jimmy Snuka	N/A	Disqualification	9:48
8	Yokozuna	N/A	Disqualification	9:48
Survivors:	None			

== Other on-screen personnel ==
Commentators

- Vince McMahon
- Jim Ross
- Jerry Lawler
- Sunny
- Jim Cornette
- Carlos Cabrera
- Hugo Savinovich

Interviewers

- Kevin Kelly
- Dok Hendrix
- Todd Pettengill

Ring announcer

- Howard Finkel

Referees

- Earl Hebner
- Tim White
- Jack Doan
- Harvey Wippleman
- Mike Chioda

== Sources ==
- "2007 Wrestling Almanac & Book of Facts". Wrestling's Historical Cards. Kappa Publishing. 2007. pp. 96–97.
- hoffco-inc.com - Survivor Series '96 review
- 1996 Survivor Series Results
