= Howard Finkel =

Professional wrestling ring announcer (1950–2020)

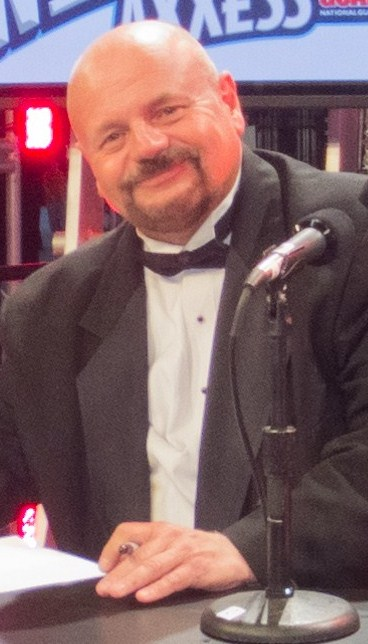
- Finkel in 2012

Personal information
- Born: June 7, 1950 Newark, New Jersey, U.S.
- Died: April 16, 2020 (aged 69) Madison, Connecticut, U.S.
- Children: 1

Professional wrestling career
- Ring name(s): El Dopo; The Fink; Finkus Maximus; Howard Finkel
- Billed height: 5 ft 8 in (173 cm)
- Debut: 1975

Howard Finkel (June 7, 1950 – April 16, 2020) was an American professional wrestling ring announcer, backstage worker, and occasional professional wrestler, best known for his appearances in WWE. He began working for Vincent J. McMahon's World Wide Wrestling Federation (WWWF) in 1975, and was a Madison Square Garden ring announcer since 1977. Finkel was WWE's longest-serving employee (40 years). He was inducted into the WWE Hall of Fame in 2009.

== Early life ==
Finkel was born on June 7, 1950, in the city of Newark, New Jersey, and grew up with a Jewish family.

== Announcing and backstage career ==
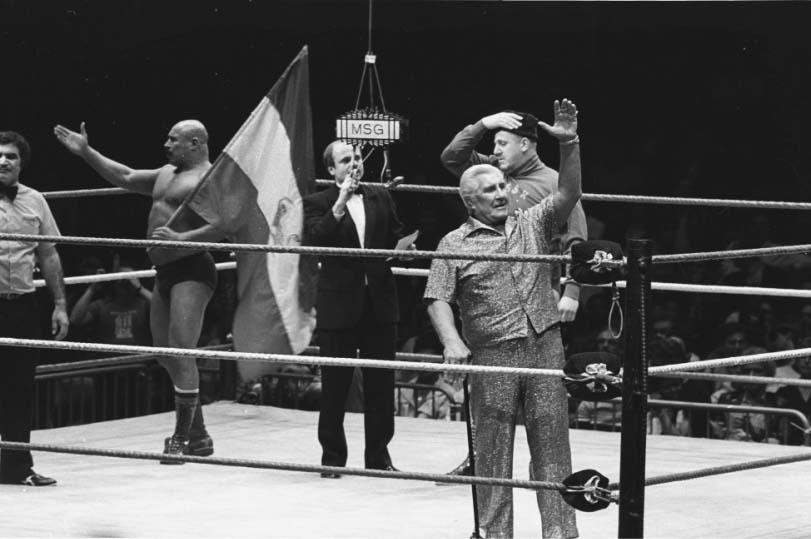
Finkel (center) built his reputation announcing matches at Madison Square Garden

Finkel debuted as a ring announcer at Madison Square Garden on January 17, 1977. By 1979, he was the World Wide Wrestling Federation's lead ring announcer for its biggest events. He became the first WWE employee on April 1, 1980, and later its longest-serving. Throughout his career, his distinctive voice was sometimes used in the title sequence for the company's various television programs. His signature call was his announcement of a new champion following a title change, in which he would place extra emphasis on the word "new" in order to draw the greatest reaction from the crowd. In 1984, he became WWF's lead ring announcer for television tapings, replacing Joe McHugh.

During a 2011 interview, Finkel said his knowledge of history had also played a part in the talent relations and creative departments during the early days of the WWF. On January 19, 1987, Finkel was presented a plaque by Gene Okerlund, commemorating ten years of announcing at Madison Square Garden. In 1993, at the Roman-themed WrestleMania IX, he was introduced in a toga as "Finkus Maximus". During the May 10th, 1993 episode of Monday Night Raw, Finkel's car was damaged by Shawn Michaels and Curt Hennig during a brawl outside the Manhattan Center before the show started. In 1995, Finkel took a seven-month hiatus from ring announcing on pay-per-views and television broadcasts (but not at house shows) and was replaced by Manny Garcia. He returned to full-time ring announcing at Royal Rumble 1996.

In 1999, he feuded with announcer Tony Chimel.

By 2000, Howard Finkel had taken a lighter schedule with the additions of Lilian Garcia and Tony Chimel to Raw and SmackDown!, respectively, but he still announced matches for some of the WWF/E's pay-per-view events until 2005. His last pay-per-view event as main ring announcer was at WrestleMania 21 in 2005, calling the Raw brand's matches; afterwards, Finkel was rarely heard from even at pay-per-views. However, he regularly announced at house shows and introduced the WWE Hall of Fame inductees at WrestleMania. Finkel himself was inducted on April 4, 2009, by Gene Okerlund. Because Finkel was one of that year's inductees, SmackDown announcer Justin Roberts replaced him in introducing the group at WrestleMania 25. Finkel's television appearances were sporadic, at major pay-per-views and occasional episodes of Raw and SmackDown. Finkel appeared at every WrestleMania from 1985 to 2016.

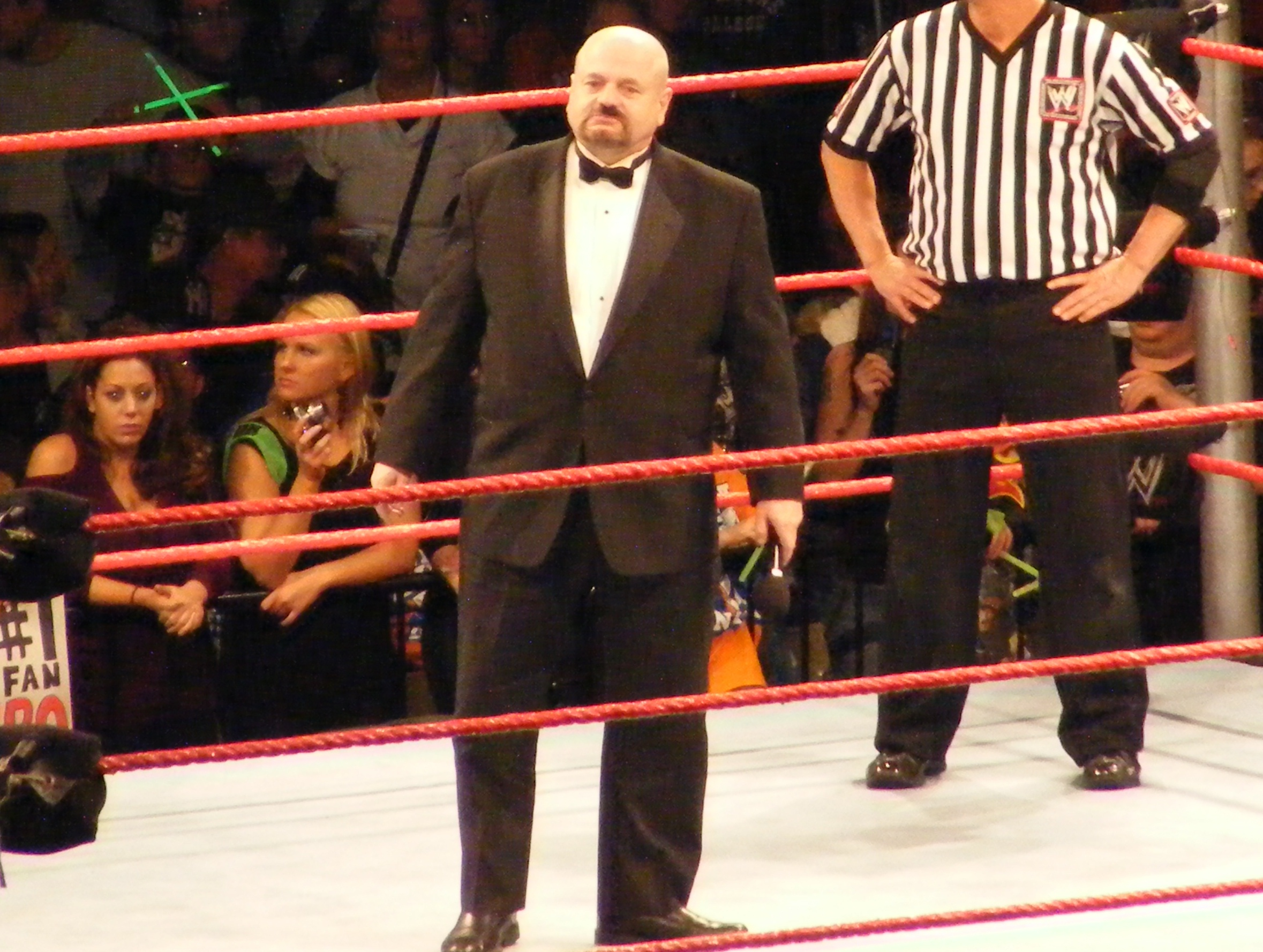
Finkel in the ring in 2009

Finkel did the voiceover in the intro for the WWE.com video show, The Dirt Sheet, and also conducted interviews for various WWE.com programs. He was WWE's chief statistician. On the September 7, 2009 episode of Raw, he announced in special guest host Bob Barker's The Price is Right-inspired segments. He was in the background of the Decade of SmackDown celebrations on the October 2 episode. Finkel returned to ring announcing (for one night only) on the November 15, 2010, "Old School" episode of Raw. He appeared on an episode of NXT, in an "Outthink the Fink" challenge. In an interview on March 28, 2011, Finkel stated his favorite (and career-defining) accomplishment was announcing at WrestleMania III, in front of over 93,000 fans. On November 20, 2011, at Survivor Series in Madison Square Garden, Finkel was the special ring announcer for CM Punk, in his WWE Championship match against Alberto Del Rio.

On April 13, 2012, Finkel appeared on the "Blast from the Past" episode of SmackDown. On July 23, 2012, Finkel was a special ring announcer on the 1,000th episode of Raw. In 2014, Finkel was a cast member on the WWE Network original reality show, Legends' House. He also served as the off-screen announcer for the network's comedy series, The Edge and Christian Show. Finkel regularly appeared in the WWE web series The JBL and Cole Show, until the show's cancellation in June 2015. His role in announcing the WWE Hall of Fame inductees at WrestleMania passed to other ring announcers in the WWE beginning in 2017. On January 22, 2018, at the 25th anniversary of Monday Night Raw, Finkel was the announcer to introduce The Undertaker, although it was a recording due to him being unable to attend the event.

During the final years of his life, Finkel worked in a backstage role for WWE. On June 14, 2020, at the Backlash PPV, a recording of Howard Finkel introducing both Edge and Randy Orton to the 'Greatest Wrestling Match Ever' was played, introducing the pair of combatants.

=== Storylines ===
As an announcer, Finkel was generally separate from the scripted angles, but occasionally he became part of the company's storylines. In November 1990, Finkel played a tangential role in Curt Hennig defeating Kerry Von Erich to win the WWF Intercontinental Championship after he accepted a bribe from Ted DiBiase (whom Von Erich had recently attacked on The Brother Love Show) to let him take over as guest ring announcer for the match. DiBiase eventually helped Hennig win the title by hitting Von Erich with the championship belt and afterwards taunted Von Erich over his defeat.

1992 saw the beginning of a feud with manager Dr. Harvey Wippleman, who regularly complained about Finkel's announcing and often making comments on his appearance. Later that year the feud turned physical when Finkel shoved Wippleman before being triple teamed by Wippleman, Kim Chee and Kamala. When Wippleman dropped the doctor gimmick, the feud would cool off until WrestleMania X, when Wippleman berated Finkel's appearance again and tore off part of the announcer's tuxedo, who finally retaliated by pushing the manager to the ground before being confronted by Wippleman's Adam Bomb before being saved by Earthquake leading to the start of their match. The ongoing feud would lead to Finkel's first match on January 9, 1995; on Monday Night Raw, he won a tuxedo match over Wippleman, by stripping him to his underwear.

Finkel became involved in a feud between X-Pac and Jeff Jarrett, when Jarrett shaved the already near-bald Finkel's head. This feud culminated in a Hair versus Hair Match at SummerSlam 1998, with Finkel in the corner of X-Pac. X-Pac won the match and Finkel assisted him in cutting Jarrett's hair. In August 1999, Finkel became a lackey of the recently debuted Chris Jericho. On August 26, during the network debut episode of WWF SmackDown!, Jericho encouraged Finkel to attack SmackDown announcer Tony Chimel and take back his place as lead announcer. Finkel ran down the aisle, shoving Chimel and ordering him to step aside. As Finkel started to announce, Chimel threw Finkel from the ring. While Jericho helped Finkel to the back, they crossed paths with Ken Shamrock, who jostled with Jericho. Jericho convinced Finkel to distract Shamrock during his match.

After Finkel berated Shamrock, Shamrock began twisting Finkel's finger, permitting Jericho to hit Shamrock from behind with a steel chair. Several weeks later, Finkel adopted the role of "El Dopo", a masked referee who unfairly officiated a Shamrock match, awarding the win to Curtis Hughes. On the October 14 episode of SmackDown!, Jericho defeated Hughes with help from Finkel, but gave Finkel to Curtis Hughes after the match. Four days later on Monday Night Raw, Hughes bet and lost Finkel in a game of poker, to The Acolytes. Finkel turned heel on an August 2002 episode of Raw and began a brief feud with Raw ring announcer Lilian Garcia over the lead spot, before both were attacked by 3-Minute Warning. The following week, Garcia defeated Finkel in an evening gown/tuxedo match with help from Trish Stratus and Stacy Keibler, who were insulted by a remark made by Finkel.

== Death ==
Finkel died on April 16, 2020, at the age of 69. He had been unwell since a stroke in February 2019. On the podcast Something to Wrestle with Bruce Prichard, Prichard mentioned that Finkel had been a resident of an assisted living facility for some time prior to his death.

== Awards and accomplishments ==
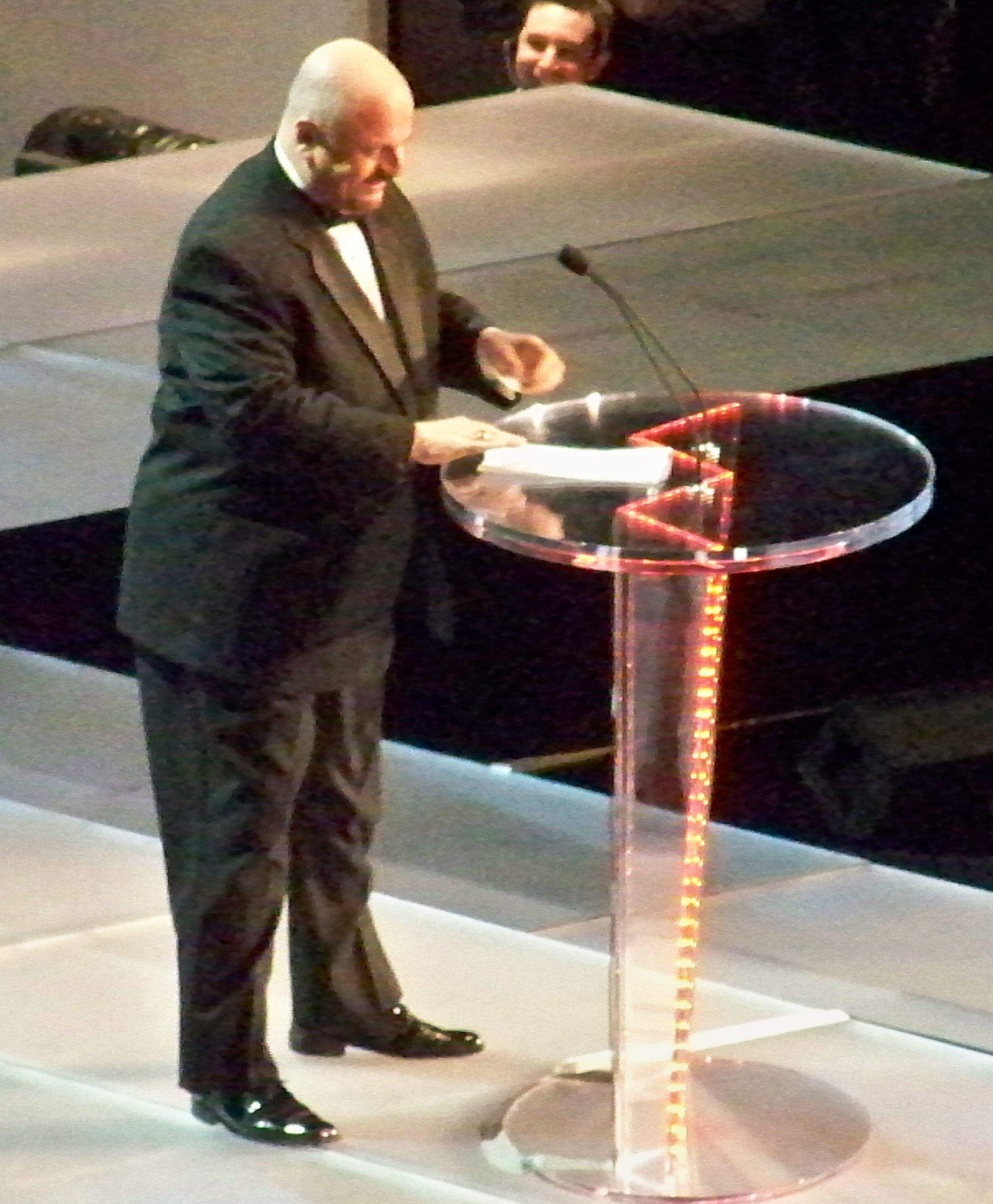
Finkel at the 2009 HOF induction ceremony

- World Wrestling Entertainment
  - WWE Hall of Fame (Class of 2009)
- Wrestling Observer Newsletter
  - Wrestling Observer Newsletter Hall of Fame (Class of 2018)
