= Clarence Mason =

Attorney and professional wrestling manager (born 1965)

- Born: Herman Stevens Jr. June 17, 1965 (age 61); Sioux City, Iowa, U.S.
- Other names: Clarence Mason; J. Biggs; Mr. Biggs
- Education: Southern University Law Center

Herman Stevens Jr. (born June 17, 1965) is an American attorney and former professional wrestling manager, best known for his attorney gimmicks as Clarence Mason in the World Wrestling Federation (WWF) and as J. Biggs in World Championship Wrestling (WCW) from 1999–2000.

== Early life ==
As a child, Stevens always wanted to be a performer in the wrestling industry. While in college, he unsuccessfully attempted to obtain an internship with WCW. When Stevens was in the Southern University Law Center, he befriended Ernie Ladd, who managed to get him a meeting with the WWF. Stevens went to New York to meet with Vince McMahon and was eventually signed to a contract.

== Professional wrestling career ==
=== World Wrestling Federation (1995–1997) ===
Stevens entered the WWF in 1995 as Clarence Mason (whose stage name was a play on Clarence Darrow and Perry Mason), a lawyer primarily introduced to play off the publicity lawyers had gotten during the ongoing O. J. Simpson trial. His character and speaking style were based on Johnnie Cochran.

Clarence Mason was introduced as the legal counsel for Jim Cornette, who was attempting to reverse a decision at an In Your House 3 pay per view event that had seen Yokozuna and the British Bulldog, whom Cornette was managing, lose the WWF Tag Team Championship held by Diesel and Shawn Michaels. Following this, Mason continued his association with Cornette and his stable of wrestlers.

In August 1996, Mason left the Cornette stable and managed Crush (Brian Adams). Adams had been arrested in March 1995 and spent some time in jail; upon his return the WWF gave him a biker gimmick and used his real-life incarceration as part of a storyline, with Mason as his attorney. Later that year Mason became manager of Faarooq and the two formed The Nation of Domination, a heel stable loosely based on the Nation of Islam and Black Panther Party, Crush would join the stable as well. Mason still managed Owen & Bulldog while with The Nation, but got fired by the Bulldog in March 1997. In June 1997, Faarooq "fired" Mason from the Nation of Domination, according to Mason in a shoot interview, he requested to be taken out of the Nation because he was uncomfortable with their racial comments in storylines and interviews that they were doing, the other reason was because Vince McMahon wanted managers to start taking more bumps and getting involved in matches and Mason was written off television and released from his WWF contract.

=== World Championship Wrestling ===
In 1999, Stevens resurfaced in WCW as J. Biggs, where he managed Chris Kanyon. A few months later, Kanyon dropped his association with Biggs, which left him to search for a new client. This time, Biggs picked the newly established tag team of Harlem Heat 2000, which consisted of Stevie Ray and Big T. The team feuded with Booker T. Biggs gained a (kayfabe) court order against Booker T, which stated he could not use the letter "T" after defeating Booker at SuperBrawl 2000 when the lights were turned off and Big T rolled Booker up when they were turned back on as per match stipulation. Shortly thereafter, Biggs was released from his contract and left professional wrestling.

=== Post-wrestling ===
After leaving WCW, Stevens headed to South Florida and returned to his original profession, a practicing attorney. He currently practices out of offices in Delray Beach.
