= In Your House 14: Revenge of the 'Taker =

1997 World Wrestling Federation pay-per-view event

- UK DVD cover featuring Mankind and The Undertaker
- Promotion: World Wrestling Federation
- Date: April 20, 1997
- City: Rochester, New York
- Venue: Rochester Community War Memorial
- Attendance: 11,477
- Buy rate: 142,000
- Tagline: New Millennium of Darkness, Revenge of The Darkness: Final Part

Pay-per-view chronology
← Previous; WrestleMania 13	Next → In Your House 15: A Cold Day in Hell

In Your House chronology
← Previous; Final Four	Next → A Cold Day in Hell

In Your House 14: Revenge of the 'Taker was a 1997 professional wrestling pay-per-view (PPV) event produced by the World Wrestling Federation (WWF, renamed WWE in 2002). It was the 14th In Your House and took place on April 20, 1997, at the Rochester Community War Memorial in Rochester, New York. The name of the event was in reference to the rivalry between The Undertaker and Mankind.

Five matches were shown on the PPV portion of the event. There were also two dark matches and one for the Free for All pre-show. In the main event of the PPV, "Stone Cold" Steve Austin defeated Bret Hart by disqualification. The undercard included The Undertaker defending the WWF Championship against Mankind, Rocky Maivia defending the WWF Intercontinental Championship against Savio Vega, and Owen Hart and The British Bulldog defending the WWF Tag Team Championship against The Legion of Doom (Hawk and Animal).

== Production ==
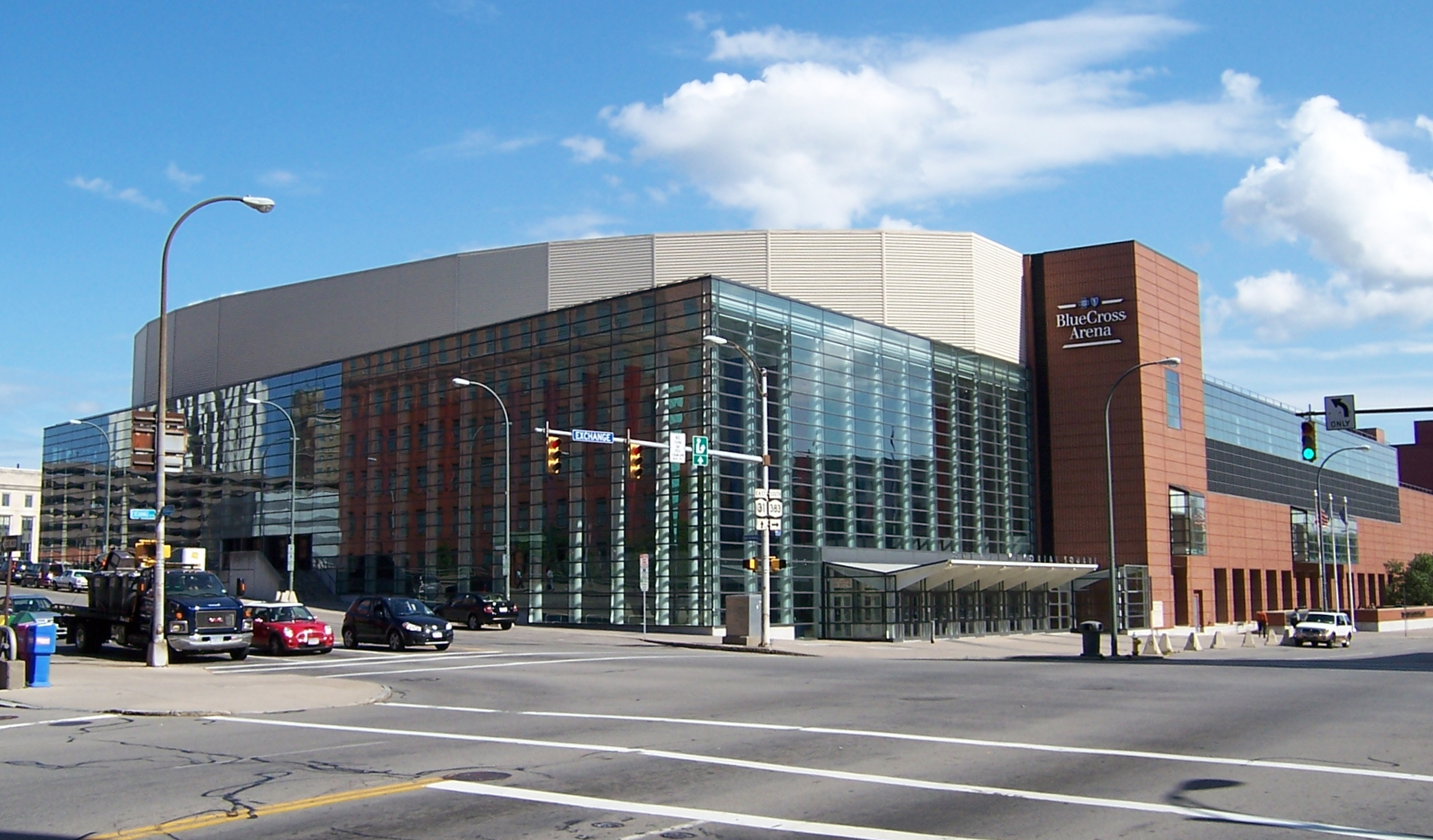
The 14th In Your House was held in Rochester, New York at the Rochester Community War Memorial (pictured as Blue Cross Arena, renamed in 1998).

=== Background ===
In Your House was a series of monthly professional wrestling pay-per-view (PPV) events first produced by the World Wrestling Federation (WWF, renamed WWE in 2002) in May 1995. They aired when the promotion was not holding one of its then-five major PPVs (WrestleMania, King of the Ring, SummerSlam, Survivor Series, and Royal Rumble) and were sold at a lower cost. In Your House 14: Revenge of the 'Taker was scheduled for April 20, 1997, at the Rochester Community War Memorial in Rochester, New York. The show's name was based on the rivalry between The Undertaker and Mankind.

=== Storylines ===
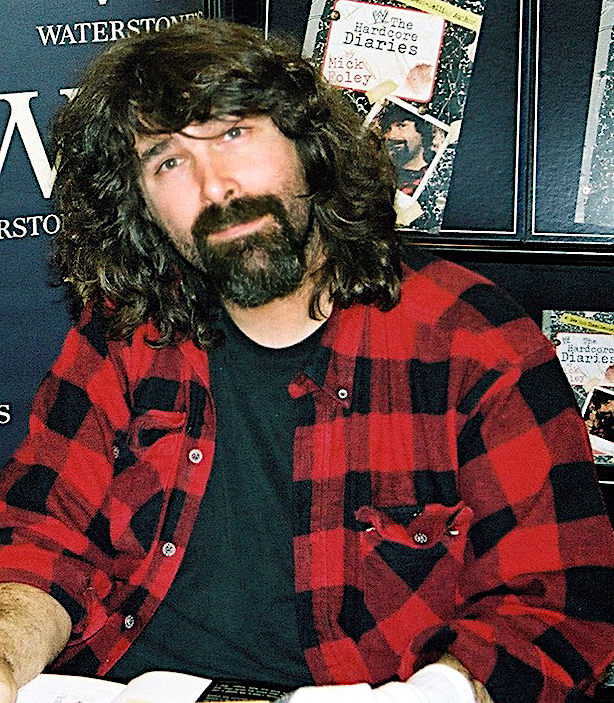
Mick Foley, as Mankind, challenged The Undertaker for the WWF Championship at In Your House 14

The main feud heading into In Your House 14 was between "Stone Cold" Steve Austin and Bret Hart. Their rivalry began in 1996 after Austin won the 1996 King of the Ring tournament, while Hart was taking a sabbatical from wrestling at the time. Austin would then spend the next few months viciously insulting Hart in his promos, in the hopes that Hart would accept his challenge for a match. Hart would eventually return in October and immediately accept Austin's challenge, with the two facing each other at Survivor Series, where Hart defeated Austin. Their rivalry continued as Hart and Austin were the final two participants in the 1997 Royal Rumble match. Hart had initially eliminated Austin from the match, but Austin's elimination was considered unofficial as the officials had not seen it, as they were busy trying to stop a brawl between eliminated wrestlers Mankind and Terry Funk. The following month in February, the two were then participants in a Four Corners Elimination match for the vacant WWF Championship at In Your House 13: Final Four, which Hart won. The next night on Raw, Austin cost Hart the WWF Championship against Sycho Sid. While Hart had the Sharpshooter applied on Sid, Austin nailed Hart with a steel chair, followed by Sid powerbombing Hart for the win and the championship. Hart and Austin were then booked to wrestle in a no disqualification submission match at WrestleMania 13. Along the way, Hart would be granted another shot at the WWF Championship against Sycho Sid in a steel cage match on the March 17 edition of Raw Is War, with the winner defending the title against their respective opponent at WrestleMania. Hart had almost won the match until Undertaker interfered and helped Sid win, assuring that Undertaker's match with Sid would remain a title match. At WrestleMania 13, Hart faced Austin in a No Disqualification Submission match, where he applied the Sharpshooter on Austin at the end of the match. Austin, by this point, was bleeding profusely and passed out. As a result, Hart won the match, however he refused to release the hold. This would result in a "double turn", as Hart turned heel while Austin turned babyface. Hart was then booked to face Sid at In Your House, but during the April 7 episode of Raw Is War, Sid legitimately no-showed the event, prompting Austin to volunteer to face Sid's scheduled opponent for the evening, Mankind, on the condition that Austin would face Hart at In Your House. Hart would then reform the Hart Foundation by recruiting Owen Hart and The British Bulldog. Brian Pillman would join the faction on April 21, and Jim Neidhart would be the last to join on April 28. The entire faction feuded intensely with Austin.

The other major feud heading into the event, for which the show was named, was between Undertaker and Mankind for Undertaker's WWF Championship. On the April 1, 1996 episode of Monday Night Raw, Undertaker faced Justin Bradshaw in the main event, where Mankind, who had made his WWF debut earlier in the night, interfered and attacked Undertaker, thus disqualifying Bradshaw in the process. At the King of the Ring PPV in June, Mankind defeated Undertaker in their first encounter. Mankind would then challenge Undertaker to the first-ever Boiler Room Brawl match, which took place at SummerSlam, where Mankind emerged victorious after Undertaker's long-time manager, Paul Bearer, betrayed him. Undertaker would then challenge Mankind to the first-ever Buried Alive match, which took place at In Your House 11: Buried Alive. Undertaker would win the match, although he would be buried by Mankind, as well as various other heel wrestlers. The two would then face each other once again in a normal one fall match at Survivor Series, which Undertaker won. On the March 31, 1997 episode of Raw is War, Paul Bearer pleaded with WWF Champion Undertaker to forgive him and take him back as his manager, but Undertaker refused. Mankind would then come out and attack The Undertaker, revealing this as a ruse between Bearer and Mankind in order to ambush Undertaker. This would lead to a WWF Championship match between Undertaker and Mankind at In Your House 14.

== Event ==
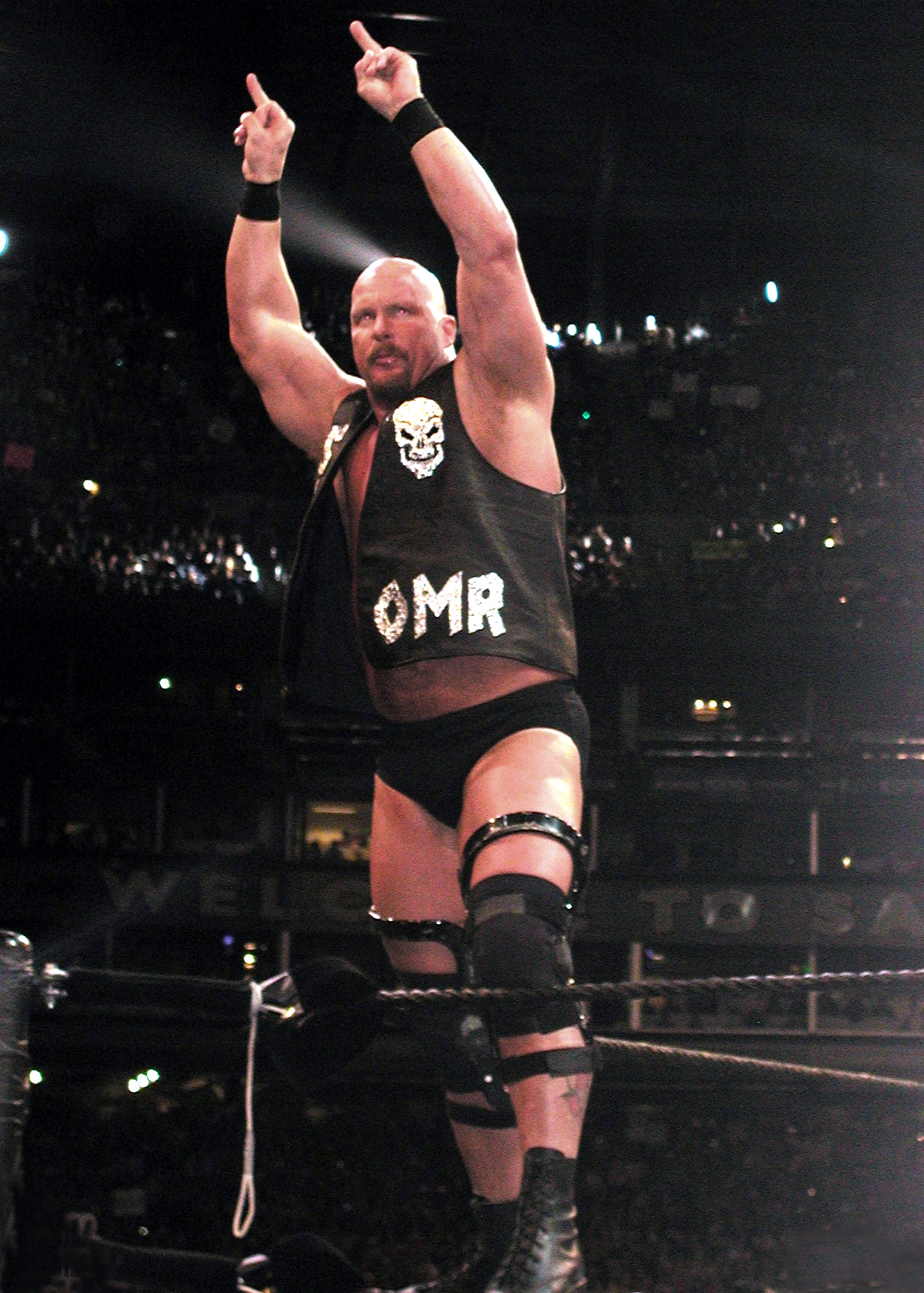
"Stone Cold" Steve Austin, who defeated Bret Hart at In Your House 14

Other on-screen personnel
Role:	Name:	
English commentators	Vince McMahon	
English commentators	Jim Ross	
English commentators	Jerry Lawler	
Spanish commentators	Carlos Cabrera	
Spanish commentators	Hugo Savinovich	
French commentators	Ray Rougeau	
French commentators	Jean Brassard	
Interviewer	Dok Hendrix	
Ring announcer	Howard Finkel	
Referees	Tim White	
Referees	Jack Doan	
Referees	Earl Hebner	Mike Chioda

In the opening bout, The Sultan defeated Flash Funk by pinfall after reversing a huracanrana into a powerbomb. This match aired on Free for All.

In the second bout, and the first bout to air on the pay-per-view proper, Owen Hart and the British Bulldog defended the WWF Tag Team Championship against the Legion of Doom. The Legion of Doom appeared to have won the match after they pinned British Bulldog following a second rope powerslam, but the match continued as Hart was the legal man in the ring. In the end, Bret Hart attacked the referee, causing Hart and Bulldog to be disqualified. As titles cannot change hands via disqualification, Hart and Bulldog retained their titles.

The third bout saw Rocky Maivia defend the WWF Intercontinental Championship against Savio Vega, supported by his stable, the Nation of Domination. During the match, Nation member Crush interfered and hit Maivia with a Heart punch outside the ring. Maivia was then counted out and lost the match, but would remain champion, as titles cannot change hands via countout. After the match, the entire Nation attacked Maivia, until Ahmed Johnson came out with a wooden 2x4 and cleared the ring.

The fourth bout saw "Double J" Jesse James pin Rockabilly with a small package.

In the fifth bout, The Undertaker defended the WWF Championship against his long-time nemesis, Mankind. Undertaker hit Mankind with a Tombstone Piledriver and pinned him to retain his title. Post-match, Undertaker would corner Mankind's manager, Paul Bearer and shoot a fireball into Bearer's face, severely burning him.

In the sixth bout, and the main event of the pay-per-view, "Stone Cold" Steve Austin wrestled Bret Hart in the third of their series of pay-per-view singles matches. During the match, British Bulldog ran in and hit Austin with a steel chair. Austin would win the match by disqualification as a result, but Bret, Owen Hart and Bulldog continued to attack Austin. Bret tried to hit Austin with the ring bell, but Austin countered. Austin then hit Bret with a steel chair, targeting his knee and then applied the Sharpshooter onto Hart until the officials pulled him off. Bret, Owen and Bulldog retreated from the ring while Austin celebrated his victory.

In the seventh bout, Doug Furnas and Phil LaFon defeated the Godwinns. This was a dark match that did not air on the pay-per-view.

In the eight bout, Hunter Hearst Helmsley defeated Goldust. This was a dark match that did not air on the pay-per-view.

== Aftermath ==
"Stone Cold" Steve Austin continued his feud with The Hart Foundation. On May 26, 1997 episode of Raw, Austin and Shawn Michaels defeated Owen Hart and The British Bulldog for the WWF Tag Team Championship. However, Michaels was soon absent from WWF television following a real-life backstage altercation with Bret Hart, forcing he and Austin to vacate the titles. The rivalry between Austin and Bret would officially end at In Your House 16: Canadian Stampede when a team captained by Austin lost a five-on-five tag team match against the Hart Foundation.

== Results ==
No.	Results	Stipulations	Times
1^{F}	The Sultan (with Bob Backlund and The Iron Sheik) defeated Flash Funk (with the Funkettes) by pinfall	Singles match	2:55
2	The Legion of Doom (Hawk and Animal) defeated Owen Hart and The British Bulldog (c) by disqualification	Tag team match for the WWF Tag Team Championship	12:16
3	Savio Vega (with Clarence Mason, Crush, D'Lo Brown, Faarooq, J. C. Ice, and Wolfie D) defeated Rocky Maivia (c) by countout	Singles match for the WWF Intercontinental Championship	8:33
4	Jesse James defeated Rockabilly (with The Honky Tonk Man) by pinfall	Singles match	6:46
5	The Undertaker (c) defeated Mankind (with Paul Bearer) by pinfall	Singles match for the WWF Championship	17:26
6	"Stone Cold" Steve Austin defeated Bret Hart by disqualification	Singles match to determine the #1 contender to the WWF Championship	21:09
7^{D}	Doug Furnas and Phil LaFon defeated The Godwinns (Henry O. Godwinn and Phineas I. Godwinn)	Tag team match	12:30
8^{D}	Hunter Hearst Helmsley defeated Goldust	Singles match	20:43
(c) / – the champion(s) heading into the match; F / – the match was broadcast prior to the pay-per-view on Free for All; D / – this was a dark match
