= In Your House 15: A Cold Day in Hell =

1997 World Wrestling Federation pay-per-view event

- Promotional poster featuring "Stone Cold" Steve Austin and Shawn Michaels
- Promotion: World Wrestling Federation
- Date: May 11, 1997
- City: Richmond, Virginia
- Venue: Richmond Coliseum
- Attendance: 14,381
- Buy rate: 163,000
- Tagline: "There's gonna be a whole lotta whoop-ass goin' on!"

Pay-per-view chronology
← Previous; In Your House 14: Revenge of the 'Taker	Next → King of the Ring

In Your House chronology
← Previous; Revenge of the 'Taker	Next → Canadian Stampede

In Your House 15: A Cold Day in Hell was a 1997 professional wrestling pay-per-view (PPV) event produced by the World Wrestling Federation (WWF, renamed WWE in 2002). It was the 15th In Your House and took place on May 11, 1997, at the Richmond Coliseum in Richmond, Virginia. The name of the event was in reference to the rivalry between "Stone Cold" Steve Austin and The Undertaker.

The PPV portion of the show featured five matches, plus a match on the Free for All pre-show and a dark match after the PPV. The main event of the PPV saw The Undertaker retain the WWF Championship against "Stone Cold" Steve Austin. The show also featured the WWF in-ring debut of former Mixed Martial Arts champion Ken Shamrock as he took on Vader on the under card.

With the launch of the WWE Network in 2014, this show became available on demand, but did not include the Free for All pre-show nor the dark match held after the main show.

== Background ==
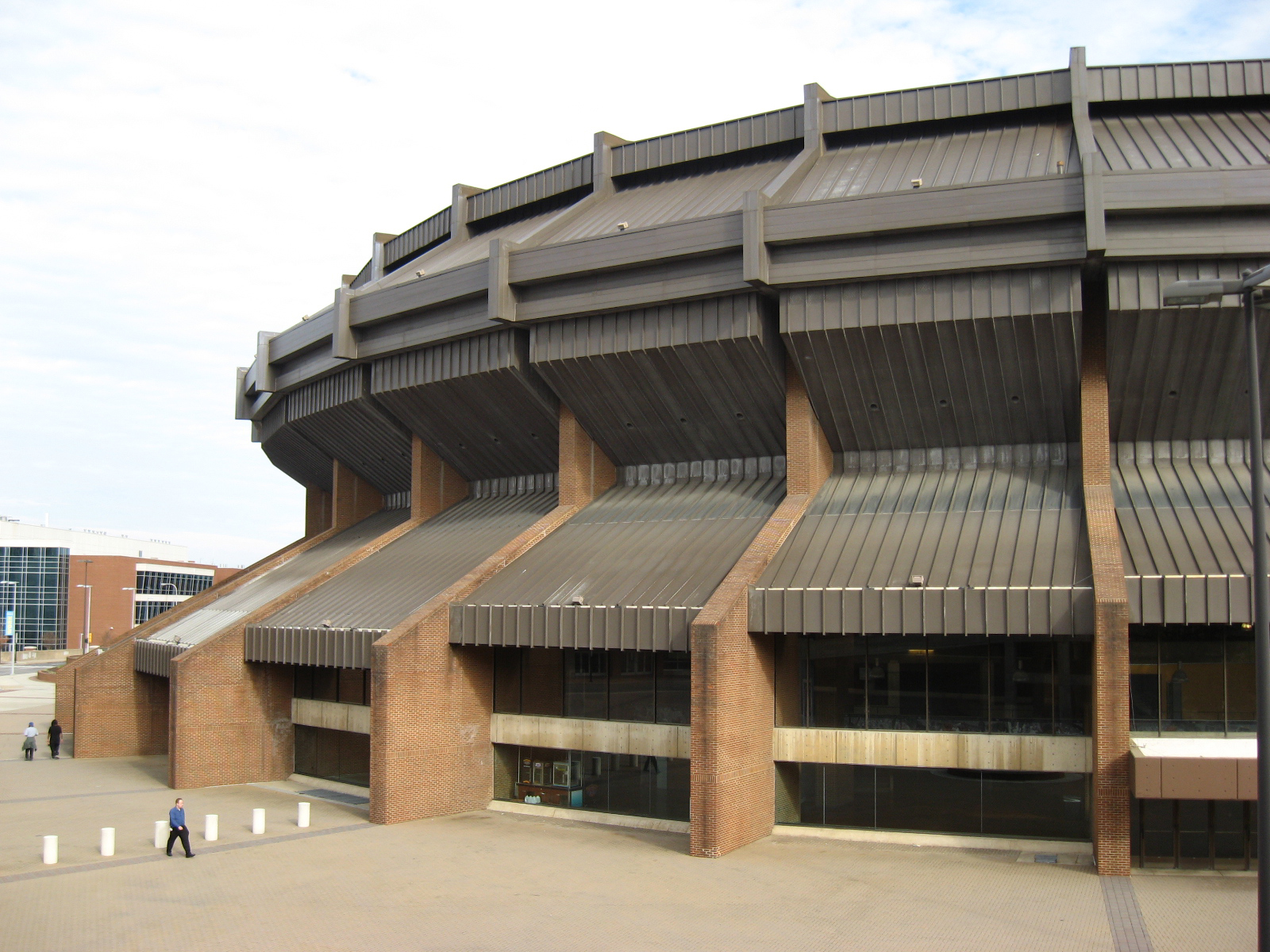
The 15th In Your House was held at the Richmond Coliseum in Richmond, Virginia.

In Your House was a series of monthly professional wrestling pay-per-view (PPV) events first produced by the World Wrestling Federation (WWF, renamed WWE in 2002) in May 1995. They aired when the promotion was not holding one of its then-five major PPVs (WrestleMania, King of the Ring, SummerSlam, Survivor Series, and Royal Rumble) and were sold at a lower cost. In Your House 15: A Cold Day in Hell was scheduled for May 11, 1997, at the Richmond Coliseum in Richmond, Virginia. The name of the show was a reference to the rivalry between "Stone Cold" Steve Austin and The Undertaker.

== Event ==
Other on-screen personnel
Role:	Name:
English commentators	Jim Ross
English commentators	Jerry Lawler
Spanish commentators	Carlos Cabrera
Spanish commentators	Tito Santana
French commentators	Ray Rougeau
French commentators	Jean Brassard
Interviewer	Todd Pettengill
Ring announcer	Howard Finkel
Referee	Tim White
Referee	Jack Doan
Referee	Earl Hebner
Referee	Jim Korderas
Referee	Mike Chioda

During the Free For All pre-show, Bret Hart, Jim Neidhart, Owen Hart, The British Bulldog, and Brian Pillman were interviewed backstage, claiming they bought tickets for the show to watch the "Stone Cold" Steve Austin match later in the night.

During the PPV, Ahmed Johnson faced off against all three members of the Nation of Domination in a Gauntlet match. Before the match begun, WWF president Gorilla Monsoon came to ringside and ejected any member of the Nation of Domination that was not wrestling, forcing manager Clarence Mason, D'Lo Brown and others to leave ringside. Johnson then pinned Crush in the first match in just over five minutes. The second match ended in a disqualification when Savio Vega hit Johnson with a chair repeatedly. The deliberate disqualification was to set Johnson up as an easy victim for Nation leader Faarooq. Faarooq faked an arm injury and then quickly attacked Johnson's knee gaining a fast victory.

The match between former Ultimate Fighting Championship champion Ken Shamrock and Vader featured mixed rules as a hybrid between wrestling and MMA that would only allow someone to win by submission or knock out. During the match, Shamrock accidentally broke Vader's nose with a series of knee strikes to Vader's face, causing Vader to strike Shamrock with a stiff lariat. In the end, Shamrock forced Vader to submit to an Ankle lock submission hold.

The Hart Foundation made their presence known during the main event between The Undertaker and "Stone Cold" Steve Austin for the WWF Championship. At one point, when it looked like Austin was about to win, Pillman reached over and rang the bell prematurely, causing a distraction. In the end, the Undertaker pinned Steve Austin, followed moments later by Neidhart, Owen Hart, Bulldog and Pillman attacking both wrestlers. Moments later, Steve Austin knocked Bret Hart out of his wheel chair and then used one of Hart's crutches as a weapon to chase all the members of the Hart Foundation off to end the show.

== Results ==
No.	Results	Stipulations	Times
1^{F}	Rockabilly (with The Honky Tonk Man) defeated Jesse James	Singles match	3:36
2	Hunter Hearst Helmsley (with Chyna) defeated Flash Funk	Singles match	10:05
3	Mankind defeated Rocky Maivia	Singles match	8:46
4	The Nation of Domination (Faarooq, Savio Vega and Crush) defeated Ahmed Johnson	Gauntlet match	13:25
5	Ken Shamrock defeated Vader	No Holds Barred match	13:21
6	The Undertaker (c) defeated "Stone Cold" Steve Austin	Singles match for the WWF Championship	20:07
7^{D}	The Legion of Doom (Hawk and Animal) defeated Owen Hart and The British Bulldog (c) by disqualification	Tag team match for the WWF Tag Team Championship	5:00
(c) / – the champion(s) heading into the match; F / – the match was broadcast prior to the pay-per-view on Free for All; D / – this was a dark match
