= WrestleMania 13 =

1997 World Wrestling Federation pay-per-view event

- Promotional poster
- Promotion: World Wrestling Federation
- Date: March 23, 1997
- City: Rosemont, Illinois
- Venue: Rosemont Horizon
- Attendance: 18,197
- Buy rate: North America: 237,000
- Tagline: Heat!

Pay-per-view chronology
← Previous; In Your House 13: Final Four	Next → In Your House 14: Revenge of the 'Taker

WrestleMania chronology
← Previous; XII	Next → XIV

WrestleMania 13 was a 1997 professional wrestling pay-per-view (PPV) event produced by the World Wrestling Federation (WWF, renamed WWE in 2002) and presented by PlayStation. It was the 13th annual WrestleMania and was held on March 23, 1997, at the Rosemont Horizon in the Chicago suburb of Rosemont, Illinois. This was the second WrestleMania held at this venue after the middle portion of WrestleMania 2 in 1986. It would also be the final WrestleMania with WWF owner Vince McMahon on commentary.

Eight matches were held at the event, including one on the Free for All pre-show. The main event was a no disqualification match between The Undertaker and Sycho Sid for the WWF Championship, which Undertaker won following interference from Bret Hart. The main matches on the undercard were Bret Hart versus "Stone Cold" Steve Austin in a No Disqualification Submission match with Ken Shamrock as the special guest referee, Ahmed Johnson and The Legion of Doom (Hawk and Animal) versus The Nation of Domination (Faarooq, Crush, and Savio Vega) in a Chicago Street Fight, and Rocky Maivia versus The Sultan for the WWF Intercontinental Championship.

The event was attended by 18,197 spectators, who paid a total of $837,150 in admission fees, and drew a 0.77 buy rate. The event as a whole received mixed to negative reviews. However, the submission match between Bret Hart and "Stone Cold" Steve Austin was highly praised, being called one of the greatest matches in wrestling history, as well as being cited as the beginning of the Attitude Era (due to the intense match style and the storyline double turn between the pair); the event elevated Austin's public popularity to become one of the very top WWF superstars. This match was the inaugural "Immortal Moment" recipient of the WWE Hall of Fame in 2025.

== Production ==
=== Background ===
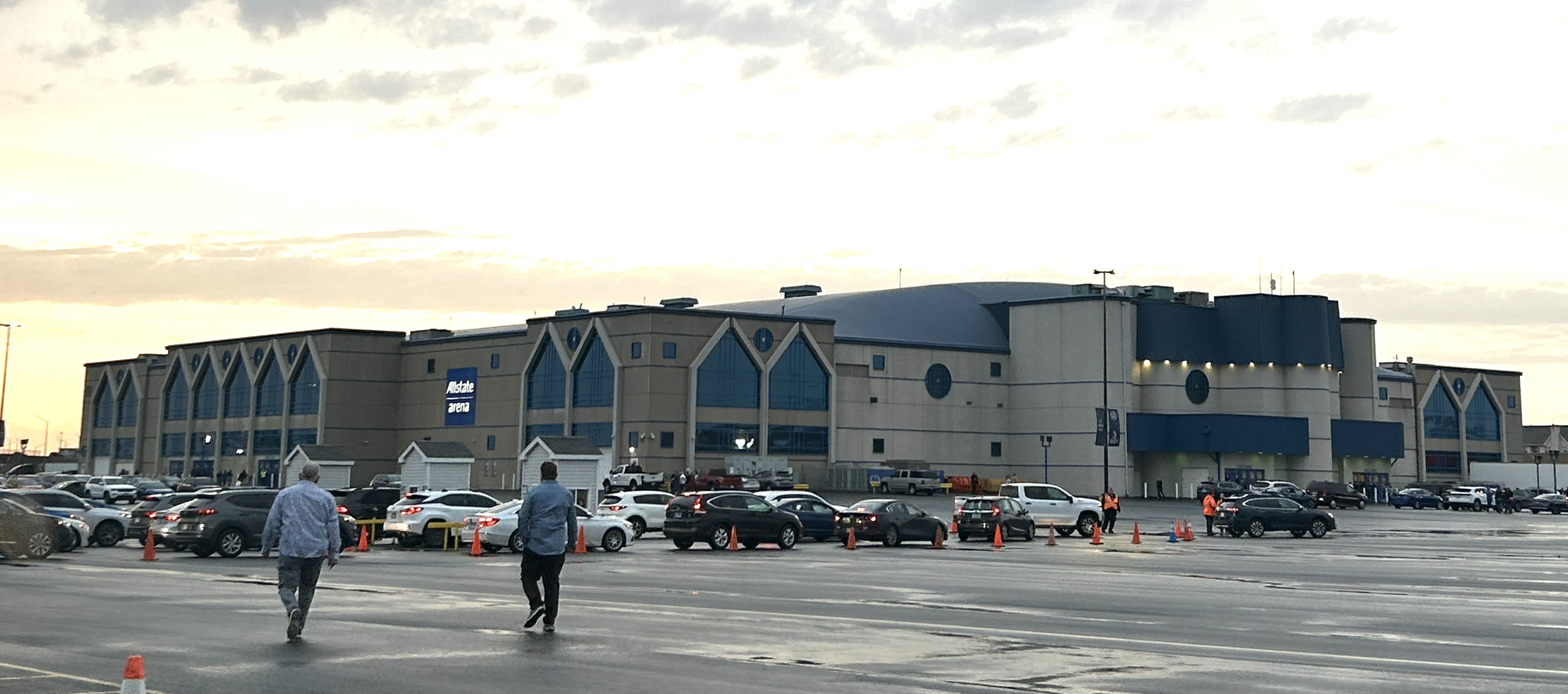
The 13th annual WrestleMania was the second time for the World Wrestling Federation's flagship event to be held in the Chicago suburb of Rosemont, Illinois at the Rosemont Horizon (pictured as Allstate Arena, renamed in 1999), after the middle portion of WrestleMania 2 in 1986.

WrestleMania is considered the World Wrestling Federation's (WWF, renamed WWE in 2002) flagship professional wrestling pay-per-view (PPV) event, having first been held in 1985. It has become the longest-running professional wrestling event in history and is held annually between mid-March to mid-April. It was the first of the WWF's original four PPVs, which includes Royal Rumble, SummerSlam, and Survivor Series, referred to as the "Big Four", and was considered one of the "Big Five" PPVs with the addition of King of the Ring in 1993. WrestleMania 13 was scheduled to be held on March 23, 1997, at the Rosemont Horizon in the Chicago suburb of Rosemont, Illinois. The event was presented by PlayStation and was the second WrestleMania at this venue, after the middle portion of WrestleMania 2 in 1986.

=== Storylines ===
The main feud heading into WrestleMania 13 was between The Undertaker and Sycho Sid, with the two battling over the WWF Championship. At In Your House 13 in February, Bret Hart last eliminated The Undertaker in the Final Four match to win the vacant WWF Championship. Hart's reign, however, lasted only one day as he lost the title the next night on Monday Night Raw to Sycho Sid after interference by "Stone Cold" Steve Austin, one of the other participants in the Final Four match (the other was Vader, who had no further involvement in the ongoing storyline). Due to being the runner-up to the title at Final Four, Undertaker was named the number one contender and was booked to challenge Sycho Sid for the title at WrestleMania. However, on the March 17 edition of Raw Is War, Sid defended the title against Hart in a steel cage match, with the added stipulation that the winner would defend the title in their respective match at WrestleMania. During the match, both Undertaker and Austin interfered. Undertaker came out to help Sid because he wanted to wrestle Sid for the title, while Austin helped Hart because he wanted to turn his scheduled submission match with Hart into a title match. Sid would ultimately win the match and retain his title. As a result, Sid vs. Undertaker remained the main event of WrestleMania.

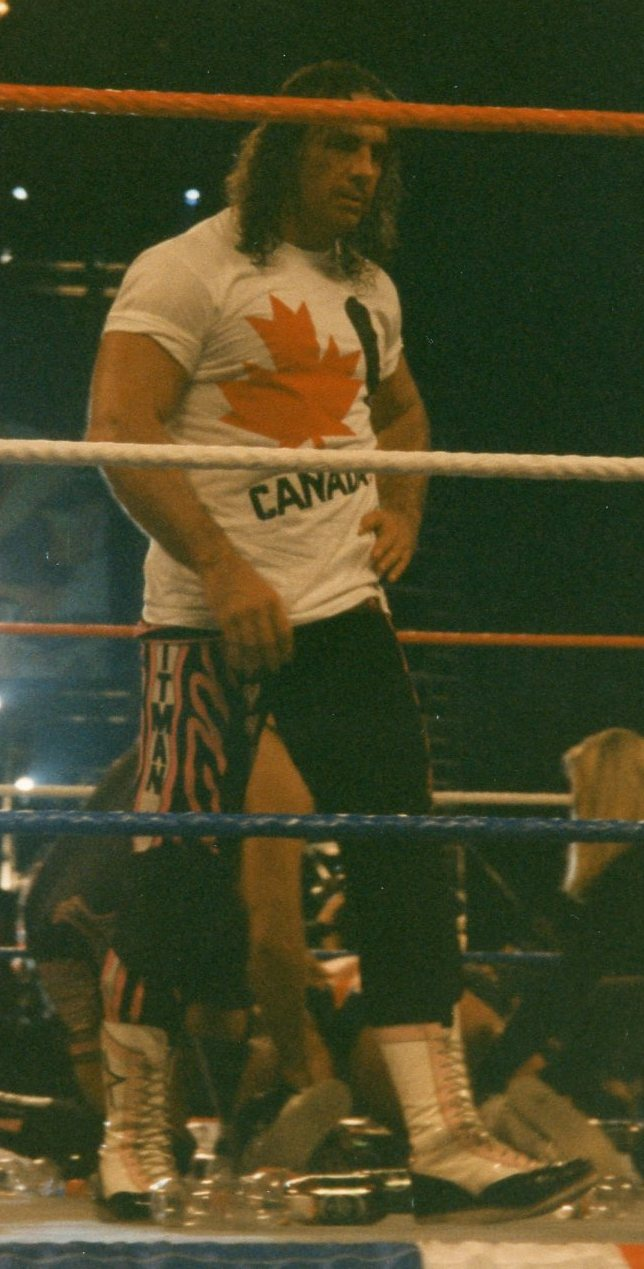
Bret Hart faced "Stone Cold" Steve Austin in a Submission Match at WrestleMania

The second main match on the card was Bret Hart versus "Stone Cold" Steve Austin in a Submission match. Hart and Austin's rivalry began after Austin won the 1996 King of the Ring tournament and began taunting Hart, who was taking a hiatus from wrestling at the time. Austin began frequently insulting Hart in his speeches, in the hopes that Hart would accept his challenge to a match. Hart officially returned in October and accepted Austin's challenge, with the two facing each other at Survivor Series 1996, where Hart defeated Austin. Their rivalry continued as Hart and Austin were the final two participants in the 1997 Royal Rumble match. Hart had originally eliminated Austin from the match, but Austin's elimination was considered unofficial because the referees did not see it, as they were busy attending to a brawl between eliminated wrestlers Mankind and Terry Funk. Austin would eventually eliminate Hart from the match, thus becoming the official winner, albeit controversially. As a result, both Hart and Austin were named as participants in a Four Corners Elimination match for the vacant WWF Championship at In Your House: Final Four, which Hart won. The next night on Monday Night Raw, however, Austin cost Hart the WWF Championship against Sycho Sid when Hart had applied the Sharpshooter on Sid, allowing Austin to nail Hart with a steel chair, followed by Sid powerbombing Hart for the win. Hart and Austin were then booked to wrestle in a submission match at WrestleMania. Along the way, Hart was granted a shot at the WWF Championship against Sycho Sid in a steel cage match on the March 17 edition of Raw Is War, with the winner defending the title against their respective opponent at WrestleMania 13. Hart almost had the match won, until Undertaker interfered and helped Sid in getting the victory.

One of the main undercard matches was a Chicago Street Fight featuring Ahmed Johnson and Legion of Doom (Hawk and Animal) against Nation of Domination (Faarooq, Crush and Savio Vega). Johnson was attacked by a newcomer named Faarooq Asad, a Roman gladiator on the July 22, 1996 edition of Monday Night Raw during a match for the WWF Tag Team Championship. Ahmed was scheduled to defend his Intercontinental Championship against Faarooq at SummerSlam 1996, but legitimate kidney problems forced him to vacate the Intercontinental Championship. In storyline, it was explained that Faarooq's attack had caused Ahmed's kidney problem. Ahmed returned from his injury in early 1997 and continued his feud with Faarooq, who had since formed The Nation of Domination in Ahmed's absence. Ahmed then joined forces with the Legion of Doom and the trio were scheduled to wrestle the Nation of Domination in a Chicago Street Fight at WrestleMania 13.

== Event ==
Other on-screen personnel
Role:	Name:
English commentators	Vince McMahon
English commentators	Jim Ross
English commentators	Jerry Lawler
English commentators	The Honky Tonk Man (Intercontinental Championship match)
English commentators	Shawn Michaels (Main event)
Spanish commentators	Carlos Cabrera
Spanish commentators	Hugo Savinovich
French commentators	Jean Brassard
French commentators	Raymond Rougeau
Interviewers	Todd Pettengill
Interviewers	Dok Hendrix
Ring announcer	Howard Finkel
Referees	Mike Chioda
Referees	Jack Doan
Referees	Earl Hebner
Referees	Jim Korderas
Referees	Billy Silverman
Referees	Ken Shamrock (Hart vs. Austin)

Before the event aired live on pay-per-view (PPV), Billy Gunn faced Flash Funk at Free for All. Gunn defeated Funk by pinning him following a tornado DDT.

The first match that aired on television was a Four-Way Tag Team Elimination Match. The match featured The Headbangers (Mosh and Thrasher), The Godwinns (Henry O. Godwinn and Phineas I. Godwinn), The New Blackjacks (Blackjack Windham and Blackjack Bradshaw) and the team of Doug Furnas and Phil LaFon. The first elimination came when Bradshaw attacked the referee and got disqualified, which led to The Blackjacks being eliminated. Later, Doug Furnas was counted-out, leading to the second elimination. This left The Headbangers and The Godwinns as the remaining teams. The match came to an end when Thrasher hit Phineas with a Cannonball Senton and won the match via pinfall. As a result of winning the match, The Headbangers earned a shot at the WWF Tag Team Championship.

The second match pitted Rocky Maivia against The Sultan for Maivia's WWF Intercontinental Championship. The Honky Tonk Man would also provide commentary for the match. Sultan gained an early advantage in the match due to his size and power, but Maivia used his speed and quickness to push the big man outside the ring. Sultan then overpowered Maivia with slams and punches, but was unable to pin him. Maivia then gained the advantage on Sultan by nailing him with a belly to belly suplex, Maivia Hurricane and a flying crossbody before pinning Sultan with a roll-up to win the match and retain the title. After the match, Sultan and his managers, Bob Backlund and The Iron Sheik attacked Maivia before his father, Rocky Johnson, made the save.

The third match was between Hunter Hearst Helmsley and Goldust. Goldust dominated the early portion of the match, but Helmsley began using submission maneuvers to turn the tide. Eventually Goldust attempted his Curtain Call finisher, until Helmsley's bodyguard Chyna manhandled Goldust's wife Marlena to distract him. Helmsley took advantage and hit Goldust with a Pedigree, enabling him to pin Goldust for the win.

The fourth match was a tag team match for the WWF Tag Team Championship, as Owen Hart and The British Bulldog defended the titles against Mankind and Vader. Vader made easy work of Owen in the beginning of the match. Eventually, both men would tag out, bringing Bulldog and Mankind into the match. Eventually, Bulldog applied a sleeper hold on Mankind which caused both of them to fall to the outside, where they continued to brawl. While the referee was distracted, Vader took advantage and hit Bulldog with Paul Bearer's urn before dragging him into the ring. Vader and Mankind then both took turns and continued to attack Bulldog. Owen tried to save his partner, but Vader used his strength while Mankind used his cheating tactics to overwhelm Owen. Mankind then trapped Bulldog to the outside and applied the mandible claw on him. Both men were counted out as the match ended in a draw. As a result, Hart and Bulldog retained the championship.

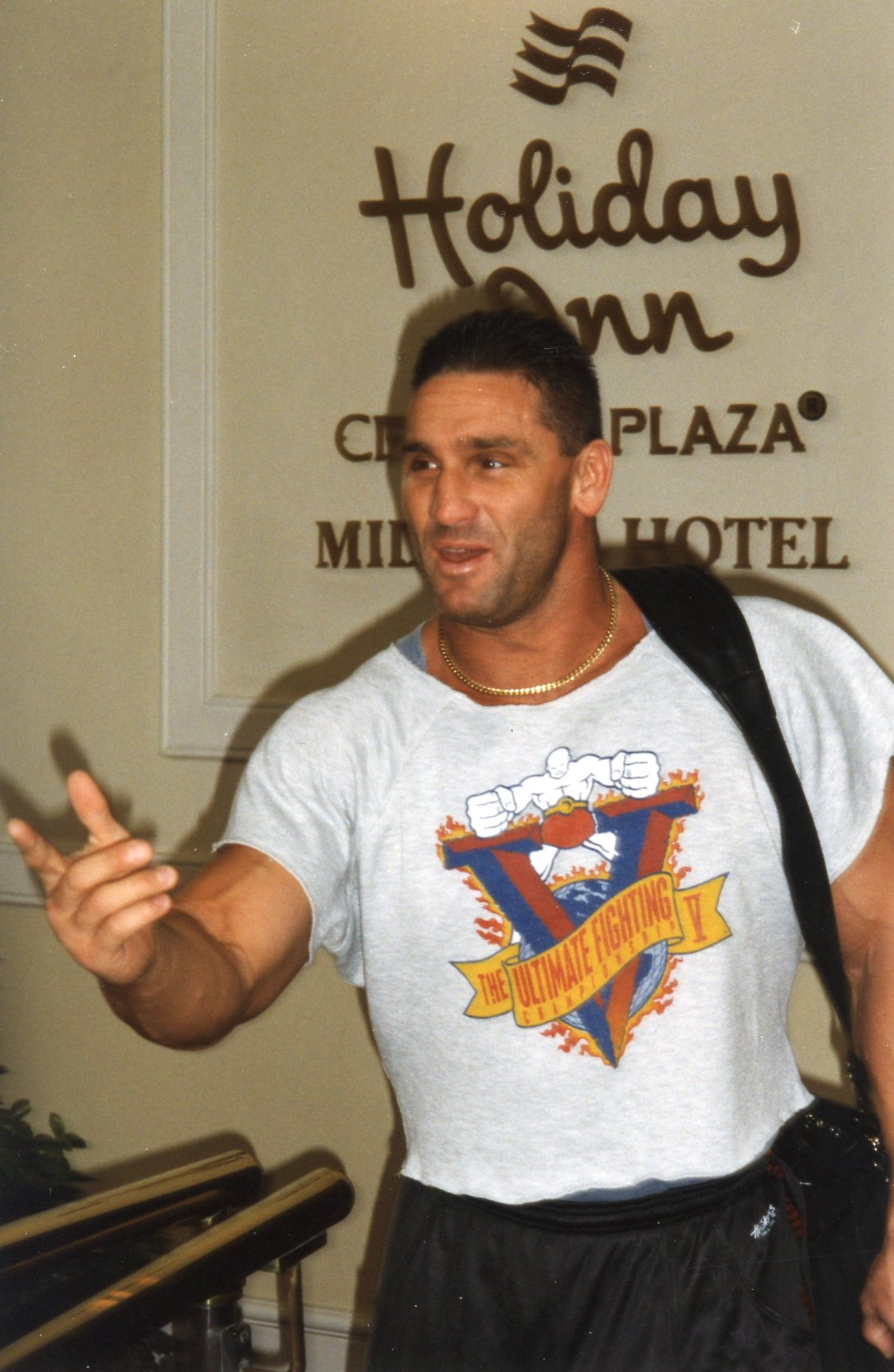
Ken Shamrock was the guest referee for the submission match between Bret Hart and "Stone Cold" Steve Austin.

The fifth match was a No Disqualification Submission match between Bret Hart and "Stone Cold" Steve Austin. UFC fighter Ken Shamrock was named as the special guest referee for this match. During Hart's entrance, Austin attacked him and the two brawled from the ring to the outside. Hart then tossed Austin into the steel ring post, while Austin drove Hart onto the steel barrier. The two men then began fighting in the crowd, where both men hit each other with several foreign objects. Shamrock followed the two and brought them back towards the ring where Austin attempted to use steel steps on Hart, but Hart stopped him with a kick to the midsection. As the action finally began in the ring, Hart focused on Austin's injured leg. Eventually, Hart busted Austin open with an Irish whip into the steel barricade and Austin's head began to bleed profusely. Hart then tried to use a steel chair to further injure Austin's leg, but Austin countered Hart and began nailing him repeatedly with the chair. Eventually, Hart hit Austin in the head with the ring bell, causing Austin to bleed further. He then applied a Sharpshooter on Austin who did not submit and tried to resist, but eventually passed out from the pain and from loss of blood. Shamrock then awarded the match to Hart, but Hart continued to attack Austin which led to a double-turn as the fans turned on Hart and began cheering for Austin. Shamrock then pulled Hart off of Austin and executed a waistlock takedown, before physically challenging him to a fight. Hart declined to fight Shamrock and left the ring to a chorus of boos. Austin, meanwhile, after regaining consciousness, hit a Stunner on a referee when he tried to help Austin out, then slowly limped away to backstage, while the crowd loudly chanted his name.

The sixth match of the event was a Chicago Street Fight between the Legion of Doom (Hawk and Animal) and Ahmed Johnson and Nation of Domination (Faarooq, Crush and Savio Vega). The match saw both teams use numerous foreign objects while brawling inside and outside the ring. Finally, Animal hit Crush with a 2x4 and pinned him to win the match for his team.

=== Main event ===
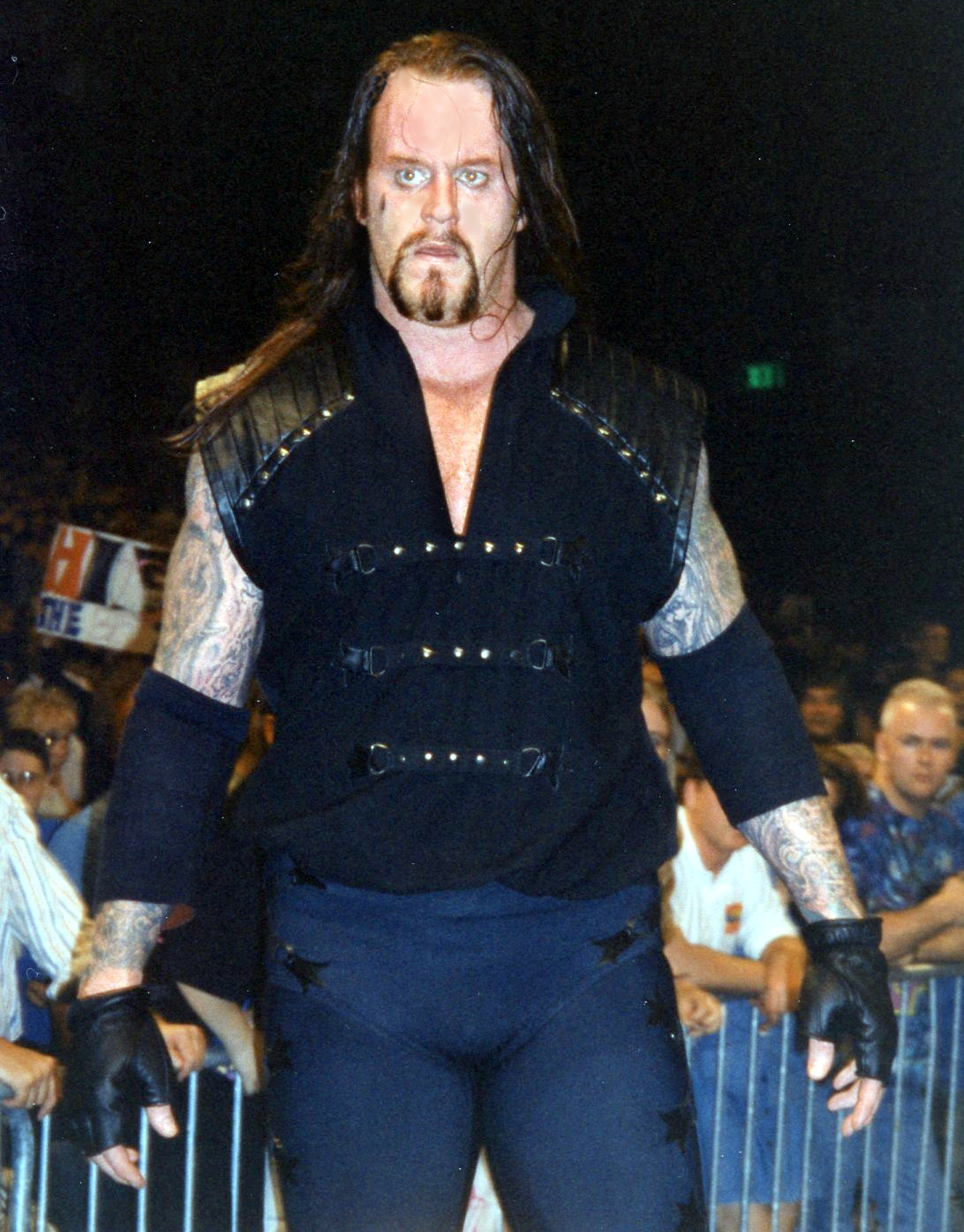
The Undertaker, who won the WWF World Heavyweight Championship from Sycho Sid

The main event was a No Disqualification Match between The Undertaker and reigning champion Sycho Sid for the WWF Championship. Shawn Michaels also provided commentary for the match. Before the match could begin, Bret Hart came out and insulted Undertaker, Michaels and particularly Sid, while claiming that he had been repeatedly screwed out of the title. Sid eventually powerbombed Hart before Undertaker took advantage and began attacking the champion from behind as the match finally began. At one point, Undertaker went for Old School, but Sid snatched him out of mid-air into a bearhug. Sid then attacked Undertaker with various maneuvers and even attacked him with television monitors, before applying a camel clutch on Undertaker. Sid had the advantage in the match until Bret Hart came back and attacked Sid with a steel chair. Sid would recover and attempted his signature powerbomb on Undertaker, but Hart returned once again and distracted Sid, which allowed Undertaker to hit Sid with the Tombstone and pin him to win the match and the WWF Championship.

== Reception ==
The event was attended by 18,197 who paid a total of $837,150 in admission fees and drew a 0.77 buy-rate.

In 2011, Marc Elusive of 411Mania gave the event an overall score of 7.0 out of 10.0 and noted that "The Attitude Era began here..." and that the main event was "a very boring match". John Canton of TJR Wrestling gave the event an overall score of 4 out of 10 and said that the show was "poor" and noted that the main event "sucked for the first 15 minutes, but the ending was okay".

Despite the lackluster reviews towards the event, the submission match between Bret Hart and "Stone Cold" Steve Austin was highly praised. In 2007, it was placed #1 on IGN's list of Top 20 Matches in WrestleMania History, and described as a match that "launched an era". Thomas Golianopoulos of Complex Sports also ranked it at number 1 in his list of the 50 Greatest Matches in WrestleMania History, citing the match's six factors of storyline, innovation, psychology, finish, post-match angle, and fallout. Elusive of 411Mania described the match as "outstanding" and "that helped propel Steve Austin into the stratosphere and become the star of the late 90s and the early 00s", while also noting the double-turn after the match. John Canton called the match "wrestling perfection". It received a five-star rating from Dave Meltzer and was also voted Match of the Year (1997) by readers of his Wrestling Observer Newsletter publication. Pro Wrestling Illustrated readers named it Match of the Year (1997). The submission match would also be the last time a WrestleMania match would receive a five-star rating until WrestleMania 39 in 2023 when Kevin Owens and Sami Zayn vs. The Usos (Jey Uso and Jimmy Uso) on Night 1 and Gunther vs. Sheamus vs. Drew McIntyre on Night 2 both received a five-star rating. Hart would call it his favourite match, labeling it "a real masterpiece". Ken Shamrock would call it "one of the greatest matches in wrestling history", and Jim Ross called it the greatest match he had called at WrestleMania and the most "well-executed" match he had seen. The match would later be inducted as the inaugural "Immortal Moment" recipient of the WWE Hall of Fame in 2025.

== Aftermath ==
"Stone Cold" Steve Austin and Bret Hart would continue their rivalry after WrestleMania, however Austin was now a babyface and his popularity would start to increase considerably while Hart was now a heel. The next night on Raw following WrestleMania, Hart cut a promo where he apologized to his Canadian fans, saying that he felt like he let them down by not actually getting Austin to submit, but Hart then cemented his heel turn by refusing to apologize to the American fans, chastising them for cheering Austin, even though Hart had won the match, while claiming that American fans didn't know what "true heroes" were. Austin would then interrupt Hart and argue that the fans cheered Austin not because he lost the match, but because Austin had refused to quit. Hart would eventually recruit British Bulldog, Owen Hart, Brian Pillman, and former tag team partner Jim Neidhart to reform The Hart Foundation, where Hart would continue to criticize American fans and claim that Canadian fans represented the proper "family values" that the Hart Foundation stood for. At In Your House 14: Revenge of the 'Taker in April, Hart and Austin once again had a match in which Austin won by disqualification after interference from the rest of the Foundation. Their feud would continue until In Your House 16: Canadian Stampede in July, where the Hart Foundation (working as faces in Canada) defeated the American team of Austin, Ken Shamrock, Legion of Doom (Hawk and Animal) and Goldust.

The Undertaker received a push after he won his second WWF Championship at WrestleMania 13. His reign lasted a total of 133 days which included battles with Mankind, Steve Austin, Faarooq and Vader. At SummerSlam 1997, Undertaker's long reign finally ended when he lost the title to Bret Hart when special guest referee Shawn Michaels accidentally struck Undertaker with a steel chair, which was intended for Hart.

After losing the WWF Championship to The Undertaker at WrestleMania, Sycho Sid's push began to diminish greatly and after King of the Ring, Sid would quietly disappear from WWF programming. In reality, Sid would leave the WWF to focus on recovering from a lingering neck injury. After making a few appearances for Extreme Championship Wrestling in early 1999, Sid would eventually return to rival promotion World Championship Wrestling (WCW) in mid-1999 and continue to wrestle as Sid Vicious until he suffered a career-ending leg injury at WCW Sin on January 14, 2001.

The event's Hart/Austin match would be inducted into the WWE Hall of Fame as part of the class of 2025, receiving the WWE Hall of Fame's inaugural "Immortal Moment" award.

== Results ==
No.	Results	Stipulations	Times
1^{F}	Billy Gunn defeated Flash Funk (with Funkette Tracy and Funkette Nadine) via pinfall	Singles match	7:05
2	The Headbangers (Mosh and Thrasher) defeated Doug Furnas and Phil LaFon, The Godwinns (Henry O. Godwinn and Phineas I. Godwinn) (with Hillbilly Jim), and The New Blackjacks (Blackjack Bradshaw and Blackjack Windham) via pinfall	Four-Way Elimination match to determine #1 contenders for the WWF Tag Team Championship	10:39
3	Rocky Maivia (c) defeated The Sultan (with Bob Backlund and The Iron Sheik) via pinfall	Singles match for the WWF Intercontinental Championship	9:47
4	Hunter Hearst Helmsley (with Chyna) defeated Goldust (with Marlena) via pinfall	Singles match	14:29
5	Owen Hart and The British Bulldog (c) vs. Mankind and Vader (with Paul Bearer) ended in a double countout	Tag team match for the WWF Tag Team Championship	16:08
6	Bret Hart defeated "Stone Cold" Steve Austin via technical submission	No Disqualification Submission match with Ken Shamrock as special guest referee	22:05
7	Ahmed Johnson and The Legion of Doom (Hawk and Animal) defeated The Nation of Domination (Faarooq, Crush, and Savio Vega) (with Clarence Mason, D'Lo Brown, J. C. Ice, and Wolfie D) via pinfall	Chicago Street Fight	10:46
8	The Undertaker defeated Sycho Sid (c) via pinfall	No Disqualification match for the WWF Championship	21:20
(c) / – the champion(s) heading into the match; F / – the match was broadcast prior to the pay-per-view on Free for All
