= King of the Ring (1997) =

World Wrestling Federation pay-per-view event

- Promotional poster featuring Shawn Michaels, The Undertaker, "Stone Cold" Steve Austin, and Ahmed Johnson
- Promotion: World Wrestling Federation
- Date: June 8, 1997
- City: Providence, Rhode Island
- Venue: Providence Civic Center
- Attendance: 13,312
- Buy rate: 144,000
- Tagline(s): It's Bound to Get Medieval. Brace Yourself.

Pay-per-view chronology
← Previous; In Your House 15: A Cold Day in Hell	Next → In Your House 16: Canadian Stampede

King of the Ring event chronology
← Previous; 1996	Next → 1998

King of the Ring tournament chronology
← Previous; 1996	Next → 1998

The 1997 King of the Ring was a professional wrestling pay-per-view (PPV) event produced by the World Wrestling Federation (WWF, renamed WWE in 2002). It was the fifth annual King of the Ring event and hosted the finals of the 11th King of the Ring tournament for men. It took place on June 8, 1997, at the Providence Civic Center in Providence, Rhode Island.

The main event was a standard wrestling match for the WWF Championship in which The Undertaker defeated Faarooq to retain the title. The undercard included the 1997 King of the Ring tournament, where in the final, Hunter Hearst Helmsley defeated Mankind to become the "King of the Ring". Other matches on the undercard included Shawn Michaels versus "Stone Cold" Steve Austin, The Hart Foundation (Owen Hart, The British Bulldog, and Jim Neidhart) versus Sycho Sid and The Legion of Doom (Hawk and Animal) in a six-man tag team match, and Goldust versus Crush.

== Production ==
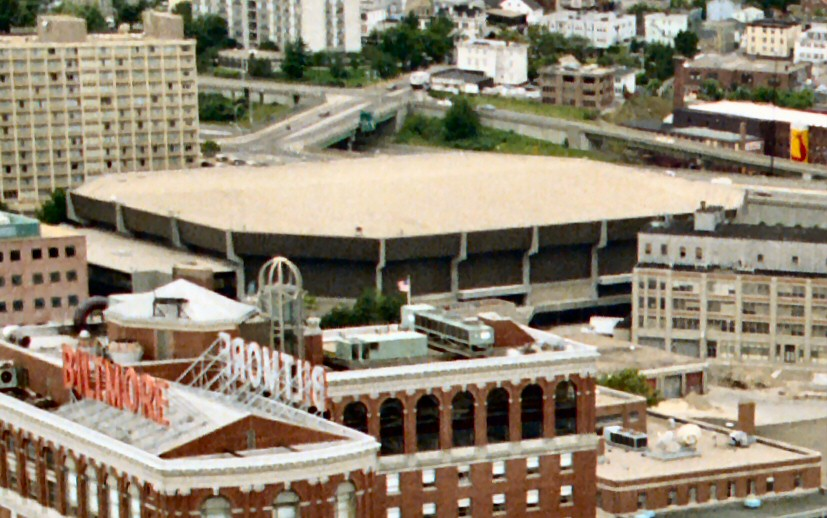
The fifth annual King of the Ring event was held at the Providence Civic Center in Providence, Rhode Island.

=== Background ===
King of the Ring was a professional wrestling pay-per-view (PPV) event held annually in June by the World Wrestling Federation (WWF, renamed WWE in 2002) since 1993. The PPV was named after the King of the Ring tournament, a men's single-elimination tournament that was established in 1985 and held annually until 1991, except for 1990, with the winner crowned the "King of the Ring"; these early tournaments were held as special non-televised house shows. The King of the Ring event became considered as one of the WWF's "Big Five" PPVs, along with the Royal Rumble, WrestleMania, SummerSlam, and Survivor Series, the company's five biggest annual shows of the year. The fifth King of the Ring event was scheduled to be held on June 8, 1997, at the Providence Civic Center in Providence, Rhode Island and it hosted the finals of the 11th tournament.

Unlike the non-televised events, the PPV did not feature all of the tournament's matches. Instead, several of the qualifying matches preceded the event with the final few matches then taking place at the PPV. Other matches took place at the event as it was a traditional three-hour PPV.

=== Storylines ===
King of the Ring consisted of professional wrestling matches that involved different wrestlers from pre-existing feuds, plots, and storylines that were played out on Raw Is War—WWF's main television program.

The pay-per-view event included the annual King of the Ring single elimination bracket tournament. The tournament started on the May 12, 1997 episode of Raw is War, with Ahmed Johnson defeating Hunter Hearst Helmsley in the first quarter-final match by disqualification. On the May 19 episode of Raw is War, Helmsley got another spot in the tournament because he was not properly instructed before his match with Johnson and thus threatened to sue WWF with legal action. He replaced Vader, who was originally scheduled to wrestle Crush but had been injured in a No Holds Barred match against Ken Shamrock at In Your House 15: A Cold Day in Hell. Helmsley defeated Crush and advanced to the semi-finals. On the May 26 episode of Raw is War, Jerry Lawler defeated Goldust in the third quarter-final match. The final quarter-final match was held on the June 2 episode of Raw is War, as Mankind defeated Savio Vega.

The predominant rivalry heading into the event was between The Undertaker and Faarooq over Undertaker's WWF Championship. On the May 12 episode of Raw is War, The Undertaker had nearly defeated Faarooq's Nation of Domination teammate Savio Vega in a non-title match until Faarooq interfered and attacked The Undertaker. On the May 31 episode of Shotgun, Faarooq, Crush, and Vega defeated The Undertaker, Mankind, and Vader in a six-man tag team match. It would eventually lead to a title match between Undertaker and Faarooq at King of the Ring. During this period, The Undertaker was once again under the management of Paul Bearer, despite his reluctance. Bearer, who had previously betrayed him, leveraged a hidden secret to manipulate The Undertaker into complying with his demands.

Another predominant rivalry heading into the event was between "Stone Cold" Steve Austin and Shawn Michaels. On the May 26 episode of Raw is War, Austin and Michaels defeated Owen Hart and British Bulldog to win the WWF Tag Team Championship. However, after the title win, Austin went to fight Bret Hart and Michaels was attacked by the rest of The Hart Foundation, which created jealousy between the new champions. On the June 2 episode of Raw is War, Austin and Michaels began fighting each other during a title defense against the Legion of Doom (Hawk and Animal). This led to a match between Austin and Michaels at King of the Ring to determine the captain of the team.

== Event ==
Other on-screen personnel
Role:	Name:
Commentator	Vince McMahon
Commentator	Jim Ross
Spanish Commentators	Carlos Cabrera
Spanish Commentators	Tito Santana
French Commentators	Ray Rougeau
French Commentators	Jean Brassard
Interviewer	Todd Pettengill
Interviewer	Dok Hendrix
Ring announcer	Howard Finkel
Referee	Tim White
Referee	Jack Doan
Referee	Earl Hebner
Referee	Mike Chioda
Referee	Billy Silverman

Before the event aired live on pay-per-view, The Headbangers (Mosh and Thrasher) wrestled Bart Gunn and Jesse James on Free For All. Headbangers hit Gunn with a Powerbomb Diving Leg Drop Combo, which they called Stage Dive and pinned Gunn to win the match.

=== Preliminary matches ===
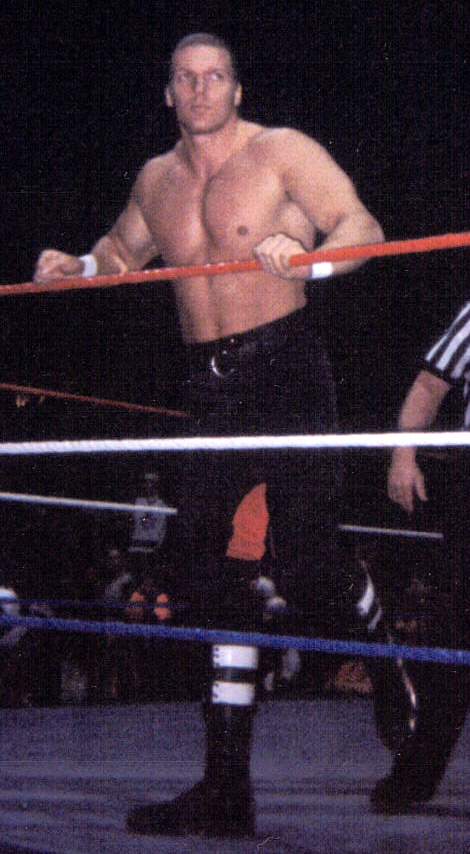
Hunter Hearst Helmsley won the 1997 King of the Ring tournament.

As the show began, the semi-final round of the King of the Ring tournament started with Hunter Hearst Helmsley taking on Ahmed Johnson. Johnson dominated most of the match and had nearly won the match until Helmsley's female bodyguard Chyna climbed the apron and distracted Johnson. Helmsley took advantage and hit Johnson with a Pedigree for the victory.

In the next semi-final match, Mankind wrestled Jerry Lawler. The match occurred outside the ring on many occasions. Lawler tried to finish the match by attempting a Piledriver on Mankind. However, Mankind reversed it into a Mandible claw, forcing Lawler to submit to the hold.

The third match was between Goldust and Crush. During the match, Crush's teammate D'Lo Brown tried to interfere on his behalf by attacking Goldust but was thwarted off. Goldust hit Crush with a DDT and pinned him for the victory.

Next was a six-man tag team match pitting The Hart Foundation (Owen Hart, The British Bulldog, and Jim Neidhart) against Sid and The Legion of Doom (Hawk and Animal). Sid tried to finish the match with a Powerbomb on Bulldog. However, Owen Hart, who was the legal man, took advantage and pinned Sid with a Sunset Flip for the victory.

=== Main event matches ===
The fifth match was the tournament final of the 1997 King of the Ring between Mankind and Hunter Hearst Helmsley. Mankind dominated the match but Chyna's interference in the match prevented Mankind from winning. Helmsley hit Mankind with a Pedigree on the broadcast table outside the ring. As Mankind was trying to get back into the ring, Chyna hit him hard with the scepter. Helmsley threw Mankind into the ring and performed another Pedigree to pin Mankind for the victory. As a result, Helmsley won the 1997 King of the Ring tournament. However, Helmsley broke his King of the Ring crown by smashing it in Mankind's back. After the match, Bret Hart issued an open challenge to any five American wrestlers to wrestle him and his Hart Foundation at In Your House 16: Canadian Stampede.

Next was a Singles match between the WWF Tag Team Champions Shawn Michaels and "Stone Cold" Steve Austin to determine the team captain. Referee Tim White was knocked out during the match. Austin hit Michaels with a Stone Cold Stunner. He picked up White and he hit him with a Stone Cold Stunner. This gave Michaels time to recover and hit Austin with a Sweet Chin Music and tried to pin Austin. A second referee (Mike Chioda) came out in the match but instead of counting the pinfall for Michaels, he checked on the Tim White. This angered Michaels and he attacked Chioda with Sweet Chin Music. The third referee Earl Hebner came in and disqualified both Austin and Michaels for attacking the previous referees. As a result, the match resulted in a double disqualification but Michaels and Austin continued to fight with each other.

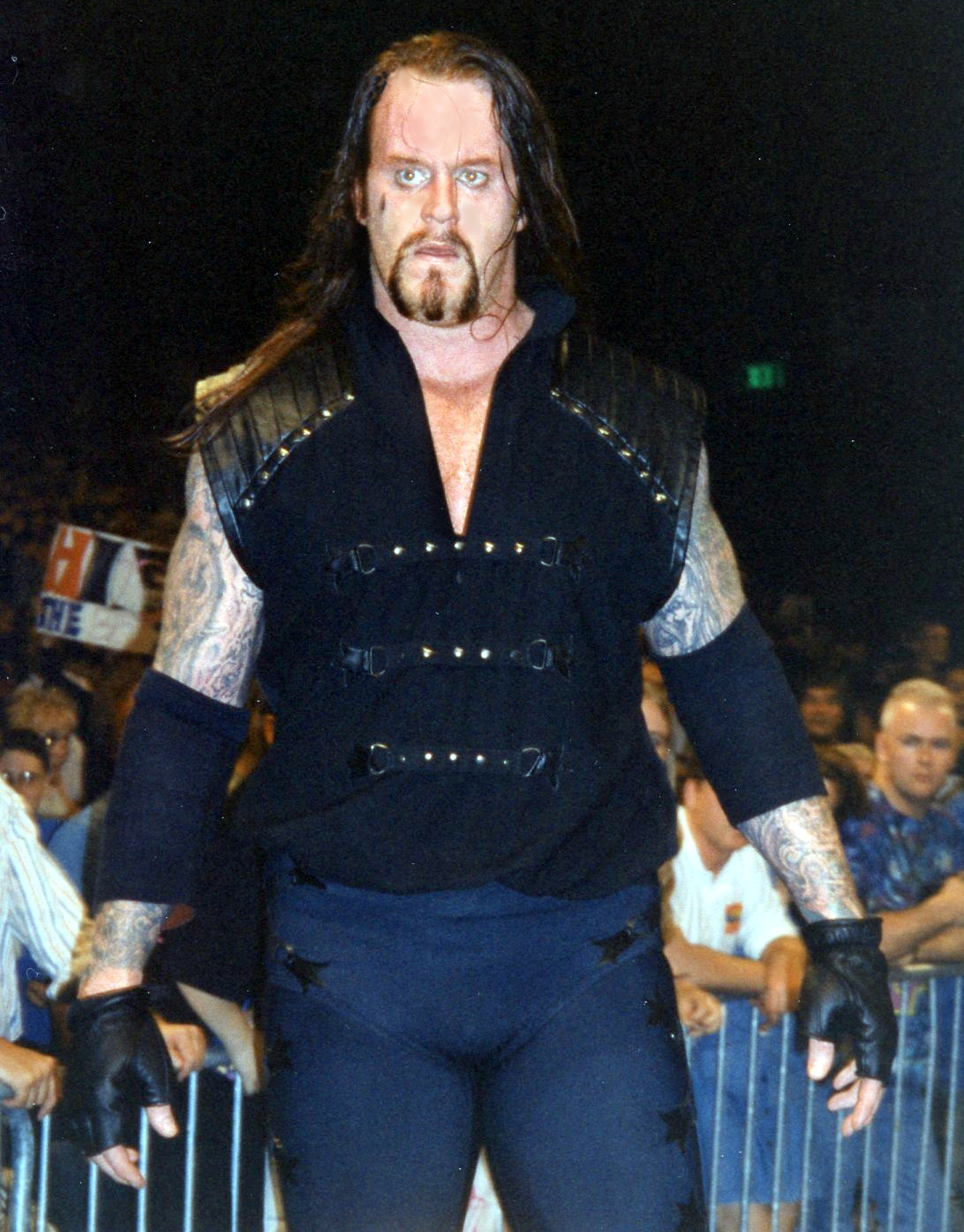
The Undertaker defended the WWF Championship against Faarooq at King of the Ring.

The main event was between The Undertaker and Faarooq for the WWF Championship. Due to numerous interferences by Nation of Domination, Faarooq was able to dominate the match. However, late into the match, Crush and Savio Vega began arguing with each other which distracted Faarooq. Faarooq left the ring to investigate. This gave Undertaker time to regain his momentum. Undertaker hit Faarooq with a Tombstone Piledriver, and pinned him to retain the title. After the match, Ahmed Johnson made a run-in and argued with Undertaker. The argument ended with Johnson hitting Undertaker with a Pearl River Plunge.

== Aftermath ==
Following Ahmed Johnson's attack on The Undertaker at King of the Ring, Johnson and The Undertaker were teamed together for a tag team match against Faarooq and Kama Mustafa on the June 16 episode of Raw is War. Johnson turned on The Undertaker during the match, allowing Kama to pin The Undertaker for the victory. As a result, Johnson became a villain and ended his rivalry with Faarooq's Nation of Domination by joining the faction.

After losing the WWF Championship match at King of the Ring due to an argument between his teammates, Crush and Savio Vega, Faarooq fired them from the Nation of Domination and converted it into a faction of black wrestlers, leading to a racial gang war as the White American Crush formed Disciples of Apocalypse (DOA) and the Hispanic Vega formed Los Boricuas. The Nation, DOA, and Los Boricuas battled each other throughout 1997.

As a result of Hunter Hearst Helmsley defeating Mankind to win the King of the Ring tournament, Mankind and Helmsley feuded with each other for several months. After ending his rivalry with Mankind and his alter ego, Dude Love, Helmsley found immediate success by forming the comedic faction D-Generation X with Shawn Michaels, Chyna and Rick Rude.

== Results ==
No.	Results	Stipulations	Times
1^{F}	The Headbangers (Mosh and Thrasher) defeated Bart Gunn and Jesse James	Tag team match	6:10
2	Hunter Hearst Helmsley (with Chyna) defeated Ahmed Johnson	King of the Ring semi-final match	7:42
3	Mankind defeated Jerry Lawler by submission	King of the Ring semi-final match	10:24
4	Goldust (with Marlena) defeated Crush (with D'Lo Brown and Clarence Mason)	Singles match	9:56
5	The Hart Foundation (Owen Hart, Jim Neidhart, and The British Bulldog) defeated Sycho Sid and The Legion of Doom (Hawk and Animal)	Six-man tag team match	13:37
6	Hunter Hearst Helmsley (with Chyna) defeated Mankind	King of the Ring final match	19:26
7	Shawn Michaels vs. "Stone Cold" Steve Austin ended in a double disqualification	Singles match	22:29
8	The Undertaker (c) (with Paul Bearer) defeated Faarooq (with Savio Vega, D'Lo Brown, Crush, and Clarence Mason)	Singles match for the WWF Championship	13:44
(c) / – the champion(s) heading into the match; F / – the match was broadcast prior to the pay-per-view on Free for All

=== Tournament brackets ===
The tournament was held between May 12 and June 8, 1997. The tournament brackets were:

Quarterfinals (TV)
Ahmed Johnson	DQ
Hunter Hearst Helmsley	3:25
Hunter Hearst Helmsley^{1}	Pin
Crush	18:56
Goldust	Pin
Jerry Lawler	11:55
Mankind	Pin
Savio Vega	14:35

Semifinals (PPV)
Ahmed Johnson	Pin
Hunter Hearst Helmsley	7:42
Jerry Lawler	Sub
Mankind	10:24

Final (PPV)
Hunter Hearst Helmsley	Pin
Mankind	19:28

1. Helmsley was allowed another spot in the tournament because he was not properly instructed prior to his match with Ahmed Johnson the previous week that he could be eliminated via disqualification and thus threatened the WWF with legal action; Vader was originally in this spot but sustained a broken nose after his No Holds Barred match with Ken Shamrock at In Your House: A Cold Day in Hell on May 11. This gave Helmsley the opportunity to fill in the vacant space and face Crush. Vader fought Ahmed on the May 26 episode of Raw Is War for his spot, but lost.
