= King of the Ring (1996) =

World Wrestling Federation pay-per-view event

- Promotional poster featuring Ultimate Warrior
- Promotion: World Wrestling Federation
- Date: June 23, 1996
- City: Milwaukee, Wisconsin
- Venue: Wisconsin Center Arena
- Attendance: 8,762
- Buy rate: 158,000
- Tagline: To Battle Is Honor... ...To Win Is Hell!

Pay-per-view chronology
← Previous; In Your House 8: Beware of Dog	Next → In Your House 9: International Incident

King of the Ring event chronology
← Previous; 1995	Next → 1997

King of the Ring tournament chronology
← Previous; 1995	Next → 1997

The 1996 King of the Ring was a professional wrestling pay-per-view (PPV) event produced by the World Wrestling Federation (WWF, renamed WWE in 2002). It was the fourth annual King of the Ring event and hosted the finals of the 10th King of the Ring tournament for men. The event took place on June 23, 1996, from the Wisconsin Center Arena in Milwaukee, Wisconsin.

The main event was a standard wrestling match for the WWF Championship. Shawn Michaels defeated British Bulldog to retain the title, with Mr. Perfect serving as the special guest enforcer. The undercard featured the 1996 King of the Ring tournament, where in the final, "Stone Cold" Steve Austin defeated Jake Roberts to become the "King of the Ring". Other matches on the undercard included a WWF Intercontinental Championship match between champion Goldust and challenger Ahmed Johnson, Mankind versus The Undertaker, Ultimate Warrior versus Jerry "The King" Lawler, and a WWF Tag Team Championship match between champions The Smoking Gunns (Billy Gunn and Bart Gunn) and challengers The Godwinns (Henry O. Godwinn and Phineas I. Godwinn).

Austin's victory speech after winning the King of the Ring tournament gave rise to the "Austin 3:16" tag line, which would go on to become one of the most popular catchphrases in the history of professional wrestling, and the event has been cited by WWE as a precursor to the Attitude Era.

== Production ==
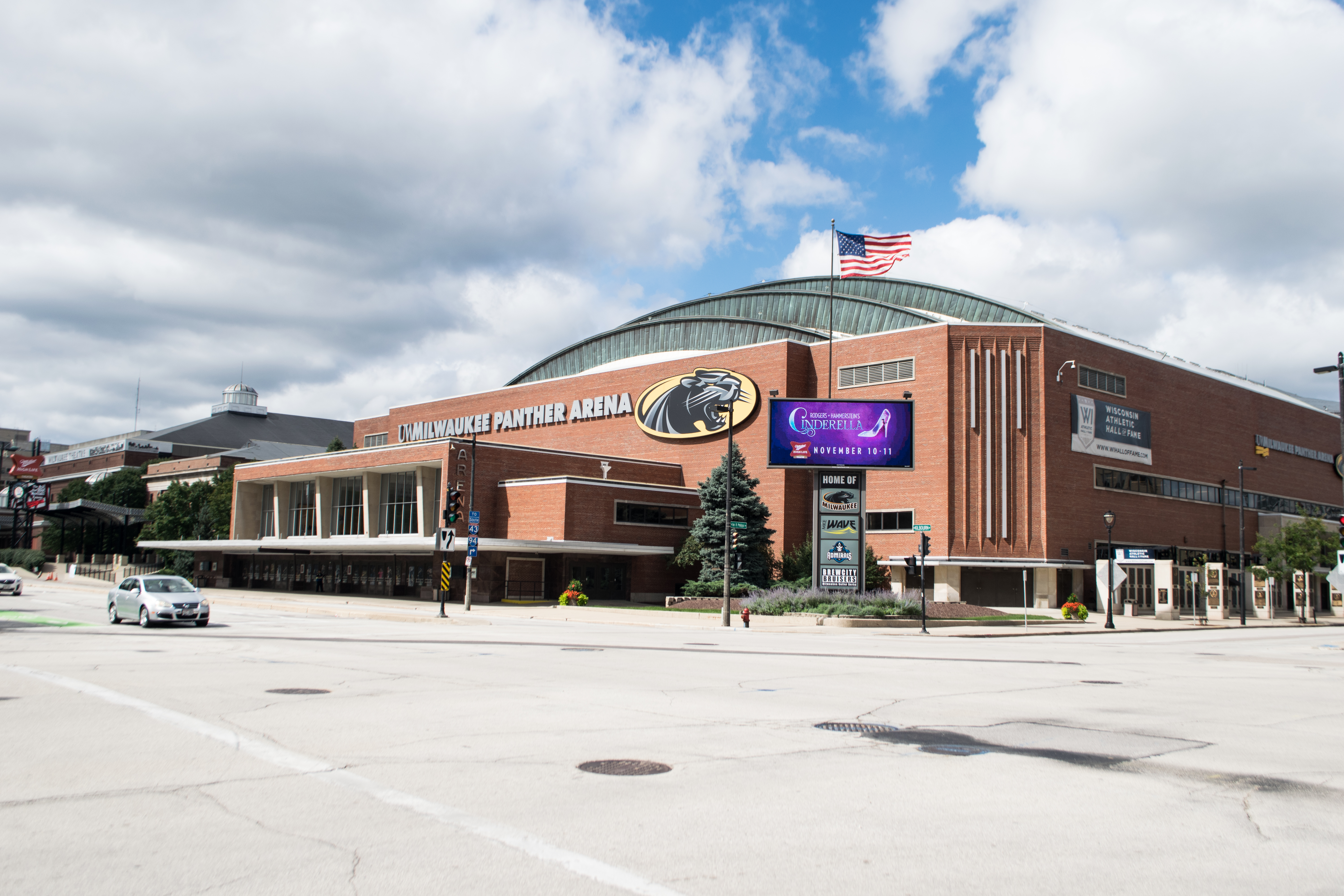
The fourth annual King of the Ring event was held in Milwaukee, Wisconsin at the Wisconsin Center Arena (pictured in 2018 after it had since been renamed as UW–Milwaukee Panther Arena).

=== Background ===
King of the Ring was a professional wrestling pay-per-view (PPV) event held annually in June by the World Wrestling Federation (WWF, renamed WWE in 2002) since 1993. The PPV was named after the King of the Ring tournament, a men's single-elimination tournament that was established in 1985 and held annually until 1991, except for 1990, with the winner crowned the "King of the Ring"; these early tournaments were held as special non-televised house shows. The King of the Ring event became considered as one of the WWF's "Big Five" PPVs, along with the Royal Rumble, WrestleMania, SummerSlam, and Survivor Series, the company's five biggest annual shows of the year. The fourth King of the Ring event was scheduled to be held on June 23, 1996, at the Wisconsin Center Arena in Milwaukee, Wisconsin, and it hosted the finals of the 10th tournament.

Unlike the non-televised events, the PPV event did not feature all of the tournament's matches. Instead, several of the qualifying matches preceded the event with the final few matches then taking place at the PPV. Other matches took place at the event as it was a traditional three-hour PPV.

Several weeks prior to King of the Ring, the contracts of Kevin "Diesel" Nash and Scott "Razor Ramon" Hall expired and the two men left the WWF to join the promotion's main competitor, World Championship Wrestling (WCW). After their final WWF match at Madison Square Garden in New York City, New York on May 19, Nash and Hall embraced their real-life friends Michael Hickenbottom (wrestling as Shawn Michaels) and Paul Levesque (wrestling as Hunter Hearst Helmsley). At the time, Michaels and Hall were portraying heroic characters and Nash and Levesque were portraying villainous characters; WWF management thus saw the incident as a major breach of kayfabe. However, as Nash and Hall had left the company, and Michaels was the WWF Champion and a huge box-office draw, punishment fell solely on Levesque. As a result, Levesque's anticipated "push" into the main event — which would have started with a King of the Ring tournament victory — was delayed.

=== Storylines ===
King of the Ring featured professional wrestling matches that involved different wrestlers from pre-existing feuds, plots, and storylines that were played out on Monday Night Raw—WWF's television program.

The pay-per-view event featured the annual King of the Ring single elimination bracket tournament. The qualification for the tournament started on the May 27, 1996, episode of Raw, with Ultimate Warrior wrestling the WWF Intercontinental Champion Goldust to a double count-out and Vader defeating Ahmed Johnson. The qualification continued on the June 1 episode of Superstars as Justin "Hawk" Bradshaw defeated Henry Godwinn. On the June 3 edition of Raw, "Stone Cold" Steve Austin and Jake "The Snake" Roberts qualified for the tournament by defeating Bob "Spark Plug" Holly and Hunter Hearst Helmsley, respectively. On the June 9 episode of Superstars, Savio Vega defeated Marty Jannetty in a qualification match. On the June 10 episode of Raw, the qualification for the tournament ended as "Wildman" Marc Mero defeated Skip and Owen Hart defeated Yokozuna. The first quarterfinal match of the tournament took place on the June 16 episode of Superstars, with Roberts defeating Bradshaw. On the June 17 episode of Raw, Austin defeated Vega and Mero defeated Hart in the remaining quarterfinal matches. Vader received a bye in the quarterfinals due to Warrior and Goldust's qualifying match resulting in a double count-out.

The main rivalry heading into the event was between Shawn Michaels and the British Bulldog over the WWF Championship. At In Your House 8, Michaels defended the title against Bulldog in a match that resulted in a no contest as both men's shoulders were down on the mat. Although the referee Earl Hebner awarded Michaels the victory, Bulldog's wife Diana Smith, brother-in-law Hart and manager Jim Cornette handed Bulldog the belt. The on-screen WWF President Gorilla Monsoon declared the match a no contest. On the June 3 episode of Raw, Monsoon announced that Michaels would defend the title against Bulldog in a rematch at King of the Ring and allowed Camp Cornette to choose a special guest referee for the match. On the June 17 episode of Raw, Jim Cornette announced that Mr. Perfect would be the guest referee for the match.

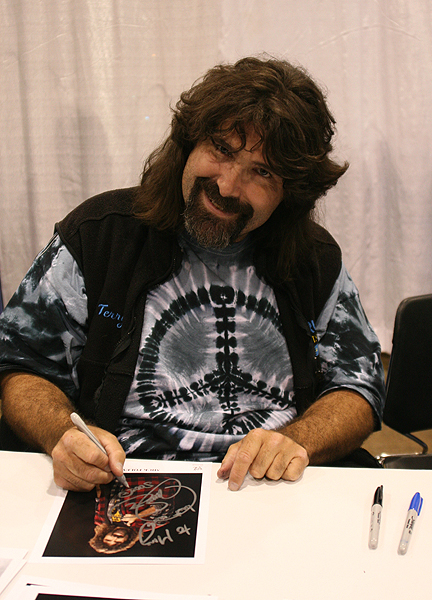
Mick Foley wrestled The Undertaker as "Mankind" at King of the Ring.

Another predominant feud heading into the event was between The Undertaker and Mankind. On the April 1 episode of Raw, Mankind made his WWF debut and defeated Bob Holly. Later that night, Mankind attacked The Undertaker during his match with Justin Bradshaw. On the May 13 episode of Raw, Vince McMahon conducted an in-ring interview segment with The Undertaker and Paul Bearer. Mankind attacked The Undertaker, who was distracted by Goldust and his valet Marlena. At In Your House 8, Mankind helped Goldust in retaining the WWF Intercontinental Championship against The Undertaker in a Casket match. This led to a match between The Undertaker and Mankind at King of the Ring.

On the May 27 episode of Raw, Warrior wrestled the WWF Intercontinental Champion Goldust to a double count-out in a King of the Ring qualifying match when Goldust tried to leave ringside and was attacked in the aisle by Warrior. After the match ended, Jerry "The King" Lawler tried to retrieve a director's chair for Goldust's valet Marlena, but Warrior grabbed the chair and destroyed it. Lawler had been critical of a comic book released by Warrior and made statements about how it would have been better if he did the artwork. On the June 10 episode of Raw, Lawler interviewed Warrior and apologized to him for costing him his qualifying match against Goldust and offered a portrait of Warrior as a present. Warrior rejected the apology and the present. Lawler attacked Warrior, leading to a match between the two at King of the Ring. In an interview on the DVD The Self-Destruction of the Ultimate Warrior, Lawler was very unhappy with the setup of the incident, as Warrior unexpectedly arrived in the ring wearing a baseball cap to promote his comic book.

On the May 27 episode of Raw, Ahmed Johnson got into an altercation with Goldust in a backstage segment after losing a King of the Ring qualifying match to Vader. On the June 3 episode of Raw, WWF President Gorilla Monsoon announced that Goldust would defend the title against Johnson at King of the Ring.

At In Your House 8, The Smoking Gunns (Billy Gunn and Bart Gunn) defeated The Godwinns (Henry O. Godwinn and Phineas I. Godwinn) to win the WWF Tag Team Championship. As a result of the Godwinns losing the titles, their valet Sunny became the manager of the Gunns. Due to the betrayal of Sunny, the Godwinns continued their rivalry with the Gunns, leading to a tag title match between the two teams at King of the Ring.

== Event ==
Other on-screen personnel
Role:	Name:
Commentator	Vince McMahon
Commentator	Jim Ross
Commentator	Owen Hart
Interviewer	Dok Hendrix
Ring announcer	Howard Finkel
Referee	Tim White
Referee	Mike Chioda
Referee	Jack Doan
Referee	Earl Hebner

Before the event aired live on pay-per-view, The Bodydonnas (Skip and Zip) wrestled The New Rockers (Marty Jannetty and Leif Cassidy) in a match that aired live on Free for All. Bodydonnas won when Skip pinned Cassidy after Bodydonnas' manager Cloudy kissed Cassidy.

=== Preliminary matches ===
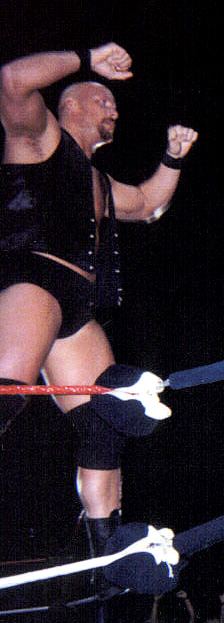
"Stone Cold" Steve Austin won the 1996 King of the Ring tournament.

As the event concluded, the semi-final round of the King of the Ring tournament started. The first semi-final match pitted Marc Mero against "Stone Cold" Steve Austin. During the match, Austin's mouth was badly injured. Mero whipped Austin through the ropes and then backdropped Austin. Austin attacked Mero with a Boot in the corner and tried to throw Mero out of the ring but Mero tossed Austin outside the ring. Mero delivered a Plancha to Austin causing Austin to bleed from his mouth. Mero returned to the ring and hit a Suicide Dive on Austin. Mero tried to pin Austin after a Missile Dropkick but got a near-fall. Austin regained his momentum and tried to pin Mero after a Hotshot but Mero kicked out of it. Austin followed by hitting Mero with a Stone Cold Stunner to win the match.

The next semi-final match was between Jake Roberts and Vader. Vader dominated Roberts with a Body Press and a Running Splash. Roberts booted Vader and hit a Swinging Knee Lift. Roberts tried to finish the match by attempting a DDT on Vader but Vader backed him into the corner and tried to hit a Short-arm Clothesline. Roberts countered and hit a Short-arm Clothesline of his own. Roberts ran through the ropes but Vader hit him with a Running Splash and tried to charge Roberts into the corner. Roberts avoided the charge and tried to hit a DDT on Vader, but Vader used the referee as a human shield to prevent himself from getting a DDT. As a result of using the referee, Vader was disqualified. Vader assaulted Roberts after the match and injured him by hitting a Vader Bomb.

In the next match, The Smoking Gunns defended the WWF Tag Team Championship against The Godwinns. The Gunns got the earlier advantage in the match when Billy distracted Phineas and Bart attacked Phineas from behind. However, Godwinns got advantage and dominated most part of the match. In the closing moments of the match, Bart hit a Boot to Phineas, allowing Billy to pin Phineas with a roll-up.

The fourth match was between Ultimate Warrior and Jerry Lawler. Lawler brought a scepter to the ring during his entrance. As Warrior was making his entrance, Lawler started attacking Warrior with the scepter and used many dirty tactics to weaken Warrior. Lawler tried to finish the match with a Piledriver, but Warrior did not sell and began dominating Lawler with a series of clotheslines. Warrior hit Lawler with a Running Shoulder Block and pinned him to win the match.

The fifth match was between The Undertaker and Mankind. The Undertaker started the match by attacking Mankind with a Flying Clothesline. Undertaker followed with the "Old School". Mankind gained momentum by a Bodyslam. The action continued until it was carried onto outside. Mankind grabbed a chair to nail Undertaker with it but Undertaker kicked Mankind into the chair. The Undertaker backdropped Mankind into the ring and the two returned to the ring. Undertaker's manager Paul Bearer distracted the referee, allowing Undertaker to attack Mankind with a chair. Undertaker followed by a Big Boot and tried to finish the match by attempting a Tombstone Piledriver. Mankind slipped out of the move and hit a Swinging Neckbreaker. Mankind tried to finish The Undertaker with a Mandible Claw, but The Undertaker blocked the move and was kicked by Mankind. The action returned to the floor where Mankind smashed his elbow on Undertaker against the steel steps. He tried to attack Undertaker with a Diving Elbow Drop through the apron but Undertaker blocked the move with the chair. Mankind returned to the ring and hit Undertaker with a Piledriver. Mankind grabbed Undertaker's urn and tried to attack him with it, but Bearer snatched the urn from Mankind. Mankind focused on Undertaker and applied a Mandible Claw on Undertaker. Bearer tried to hit Mankind with the urn but Mankind pulled Undertaker to prevent from being hit and Undertaker was hit with the urn. This allowed Mankind to apply another Mandible Claw on Undertaker. As a result, Mankind was awarded the victory by TKO.

=== Main event matches ===
In the sixth match of the event, Goldust defended the WWF Intercontinental Championship against Ahmed Johnson. Johnson dominated most of the match. Goldust had nearly won the match after applying a Sleeper Hold, which he called Good Night Sweet Charlotte but did not pin Johnson and tried to further assault him but Johnson countered and hit Goldust with a Sitout Pearl River Plunge to win the match and the Intercontinental Championship.

Next was the final round match of the King of the Ring tournament pitting "Stone Cold" Steve Austin against Jake Roberts. WWF President Gorilla Monsoon came to the ring during the match and offered Roberts to stop the match due to his rib injury suffered in his semifinal match against Vader. Roberts regrouped and refused to forfeit. He began attacking Austin and attempted to hit a DDT, but Austin avoided the move and began focusing on Roberts' injured ribs. In the end of the match, Austin hit a Stone Cold Stunner to win the match and the King of the Ring tournament. After the match, Austin mocked Roberts' Bible-preacher gimmick during his coronation as King of the Ring by uttering a quote:

You sit there and you thump your Bible, and you say your prayers, and it didn't get you anywhere! Talk about your psalms, talk about John 3:16 ... Austin 3:16 says I just whipped your ass!

— "Stone Cold" Steve Austin, King of the Ring 1996 – June 23, 1996

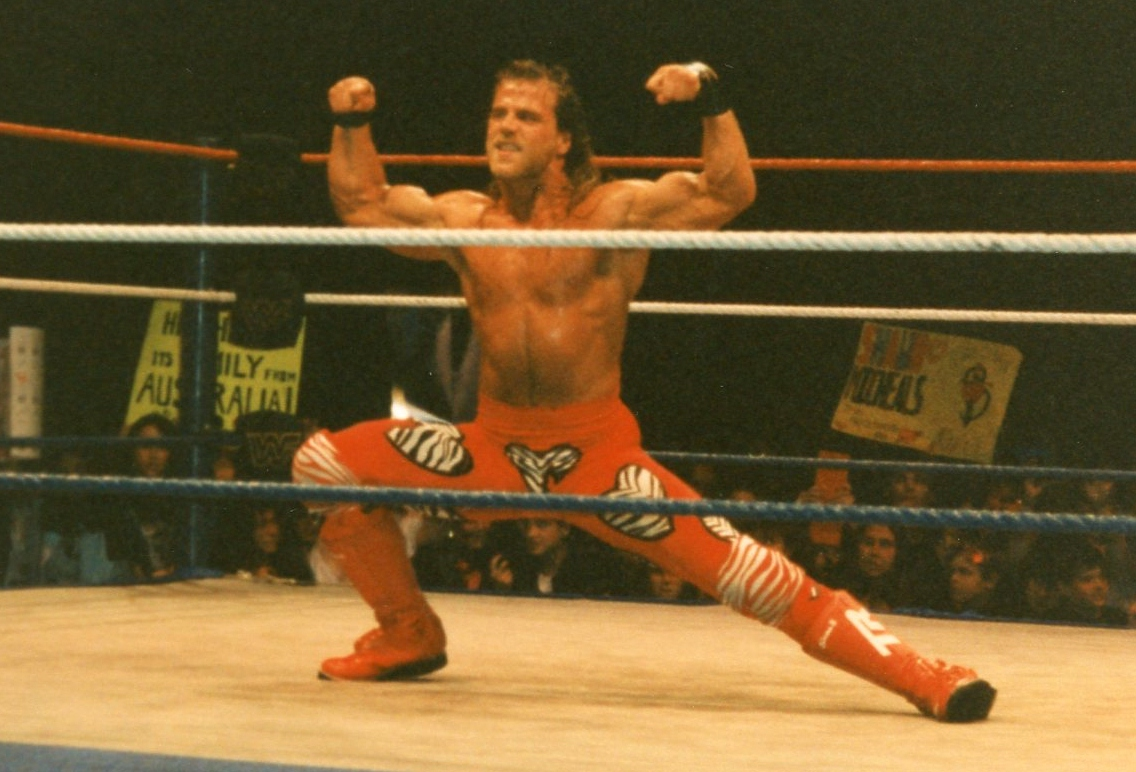
Shawn Michaels defended the WWF Championship against British Bulldog at King of the Ring.

The main event featured Shawn Michaels defending the WWF Championship against the British Bulldog. Mr. Perfect was scheduled to referee the match but at the last minute President Gorilla Monsoon decided that Perfect would be refereeing outside the ring (due to Perfect's controversial refereeing at WrestleMania X) while Earl Hebner would be the inside referee. The match went back and forth with Bulldog's wife Diana and manager Cornette interfering on Bulldog's behalf on many occasions during the match. Bulldog's brother-in-law and teammate Owen Hart served as the guest commentator for the entire pay-per-view. In the closing moments of the match, Michaels attempted to hit Bulldog a Hurricanrana but Bulldog countered it into a Sitout Powerbomb. Michaels regained his momentum and hit Bulldog a Flying Forearm Smash, a Diving Elbow Drop and a Superkick, which he called Sweet Chin Music and attempted to pin Bulldog. Hebner and Perfect both began counting the pinfall. Hart left the commentary table and pulled Perfect out of the ring to prevent him from counting the pin but Hebner counted to three, allowing Michaels to win the match and retain the WWF Championship. After the match, Bulldog and Hart attacked Michaels. Johnson came to rescue Michaels until Bulldog and Hart's teammate Vader joined Bulldog and Hart to attack Michaels and Johnson. Warrior came out to rescue Michaels and Johnson from Bulldog, Hart and Vader and this ended the show.

The event was followed by a non-televised match, which served as the final match for the live audience in which Hunter Hearst Helmsley defeated Aldo Montoya.

== Aftermath ==
Following the formation of an alliance of Shawn Michaels, Ahmed Johnson and Warrior after Michaels' title defense at King of the Ring, the three were scheduled to compete against Camp Cornette (British Bulldog, Owen Hart and Vader) at In Your House 9. However, after his match with Hart on July 8 edition of Raw, Warrior was released from his WWF contract due to missing several house shows. As a result, Warrior was replaced by Sycho Sid as Michaels and Johnson's tag team partner. At In Your House 9, Camp Cornette defeated Michaels, Johnson and Sid.

The Undertaker continued his rivalry with Mankind after King of the Ring. Mankind interfered in Undertaker's match with Goldust at In Your House 9, causing Goldust to get disqualified. After the match, Undertaker and Mankind brawled with each other and their fight reached the locker room. This led to the first-ever Boiler Room Brawl between the two at SummerSlam which Mankind won after Paul Bearer turned on Undertaker and helped Mankind in winning the match.

After winning the 1996 King of the Ring tournament, Austin quickly rose to stardom and his catchphrase "Austin 3:16" became the most popular catchphrase in professional wrestling history. Austin was pushed as a main eventer as he constantly challenged the inactive Bret "Hitman" Hart to a match. On the October 21 edition of Raw, Hart returned to WWF and made his first in-ring appearance since losing the WWF Championship to Michaels at WrestleMania XII. Hart accepted Austin's challenge to a match and defeated Austin at Survivor Series. The popularity of Austin's character was one of the seeds that would germinate into the Attitude Era a year later, with Austin being a major character in WWF storylines and a regular PPV head-liner until his in-ring retirement in 2003.

This would be Ultimate Warrior's final PPV match. His final WWF match was a victory against Owen Hart by DQ. His next appearance in a WWE ring was in a non-wrestling role at WrestleMania XXX in 2014 (almost 18 years later) the day after being inducted into the WWE Hall of Fame.

== Results ==
No.	Results	Stipulations	Times
1^{F}	The Bodydonnas (Skip and Zip) (with Kloudi) defeated The New Rockers (Marty Jannetty and Leif Cassidy)	Tag team match	8:06
2	"Stone Cold" Steve Austin defeated Marc Mero (with Sable)	King of the Ring semi-final match	16:49
3	Jake Roberts defeated Vader (with Jim Cornette) by disqualification	King of the Ring semi-final match	3:34
4	The Smoking Gunns (Billy Gunn and Bart Gunn) (c) (with Sunny) defeated The Godwinns (Henry O. Godwinn and Phineas I. Godwinn) (with Hillbilly Jim)	Tag team match for the WWF Tag Team Championship	10:10
5	Ultimate Warrior defeated Jerry Lawler	Singles match	3:50
6	Mankind defeated The Undertaker (with Paul Bearer) by technical submission	Singles match	18:21
7	Ahmed Johnson defeated Goldust (c) (with Marlena)	Singles match for the WWF Intercontinental Championship	15:34
8	"Stone Cold" Steve Austin defeated Jake Roberts	King of the Ring final match	4:28
9	Shawn Michaels (c) (with José Lothario) defeated The British Bulldog (with Diana Smith and Jim Cornette)	Singles match for the WWF Championship; Mr. Perfect was the special outside enforcer.	26:24
10^{D}	Hunter Hearst Helmsley defeated Aldo Montoya	Singles match	3:00
(c) / – the champion(s) heading into the match; F / – the match was broadcast prior to the pay-per-view on Free for All; D / – this was a dark match

=== Tournament brackets ===
The tournament took place between May 27 and June 23, 1996 (the entire first two rounds were actually done on May 27 and 28, two of the three quarterfinal matches actually occurred before the first round was completed). The tournament brackets were:

Round of 16 (TV)
Ahmed Johnson	Pin
Vader	11:32
Goldust	DCO
Ultimate Warrior	15:20
Hunter Hearst Helmsley	Pin
Jake Roberts	9:34
Justin Bradshaw	Pin
Henry O. Godwinn	7:39
"Stone Cold" Steve Austin	Sub
Bob Holly	9:34
Marty Jannetty	Pin
Savio Vega	7:25
Marc Mero	Pin
Skip	10:28
Owen Hart	Pin
Yokozuna	3:58

Quarterfinals (TV)
Vader
BYE
Jake "The Snake" Roberts	Pin
Justin Bradshaw	6:15
"Stone Cold" Steve Austin	Pin
Savio Vega	8:10
Marc Mero	Pin
Owen Hart	9:43

Semifinals (PPV)
Vader	DQ
Jake Roberts	3:34
"Stone Cold" Steve Austin	Pin
Marc Mero	16:49

Final (PPV)
Jake "The Snake" Roberts	4:28
"Stone Cold" Steve Austin	Pin
