= In Your House 16: Canadian Stampede =

1997 World Wrestling Federation pay-per-view event

- Promotional poster featuring Owen Hart, Bret Hart, and The British Bulldog
- Promotion: World Wrestling Federation
- Date: July 6, 1997
- City: Calgary, Alberta, Canada
- Venue: Canadian Airlines Saddledome
- Attendance: 12,151
- Buy rate: 171,000

Pay-per-view chronology
← Previous; King of the Ring	Next → SummerSlam

In Your House chronology
← Previous; A Cold Day in Hell	Next → Ground Zero

WWE in Canada chronology
← Previous; In Your House 9: International Incident	Next → Survivor Series

In Your House 16: Canadian Stampede was a 1997 professional wrestling pay-per-view (PPV) event produced by the American promotion World Wrestling Federation (WWF, renamed WWE in 2002). It was the 16th In Your House and took place on July 6, 1997, at the Canadian Airlines Saddledome in Calgary, Alberta, Canada. The name of the show was in reference to the event being held in Canada, as well as the annual 10-day Calgary Stampede, where the event was held on the final day. This was the third In Your House in Canada, after In Your House 4 in October 1995 in Winnipeg, Manitoba and In Your House 9 in July 1996 in Vancouver, British Columbia.

The event's card consisted of four matches with one match held on the Free for All pre-show. The main event was a 10-man tag team match featuring The Hart Foundation (Bret Hart, Jim Neidhart, Owen Hart, British Bulldog, and Brian Pillman) against "Stone Cold" Steve Austin, Ken Shamrock, Goldust, and The Legion of Doom (Hawk and Animal). On the undercard, The Undertaker defended the WWF Championship against Vader, The Great Sasuke faced Taka Michinoku, and Hunter Hearst Helmsley wrestled Mankind.

The show received critical acclaim from wrestling publications, websites, and fans. Footage of the main event was featured in the 1998 documentary Wrestling With Shadows. The event marked Bret Hart's return to the ring after being sidelined for over two months with arthroscopic knee surgery.

== Production ==
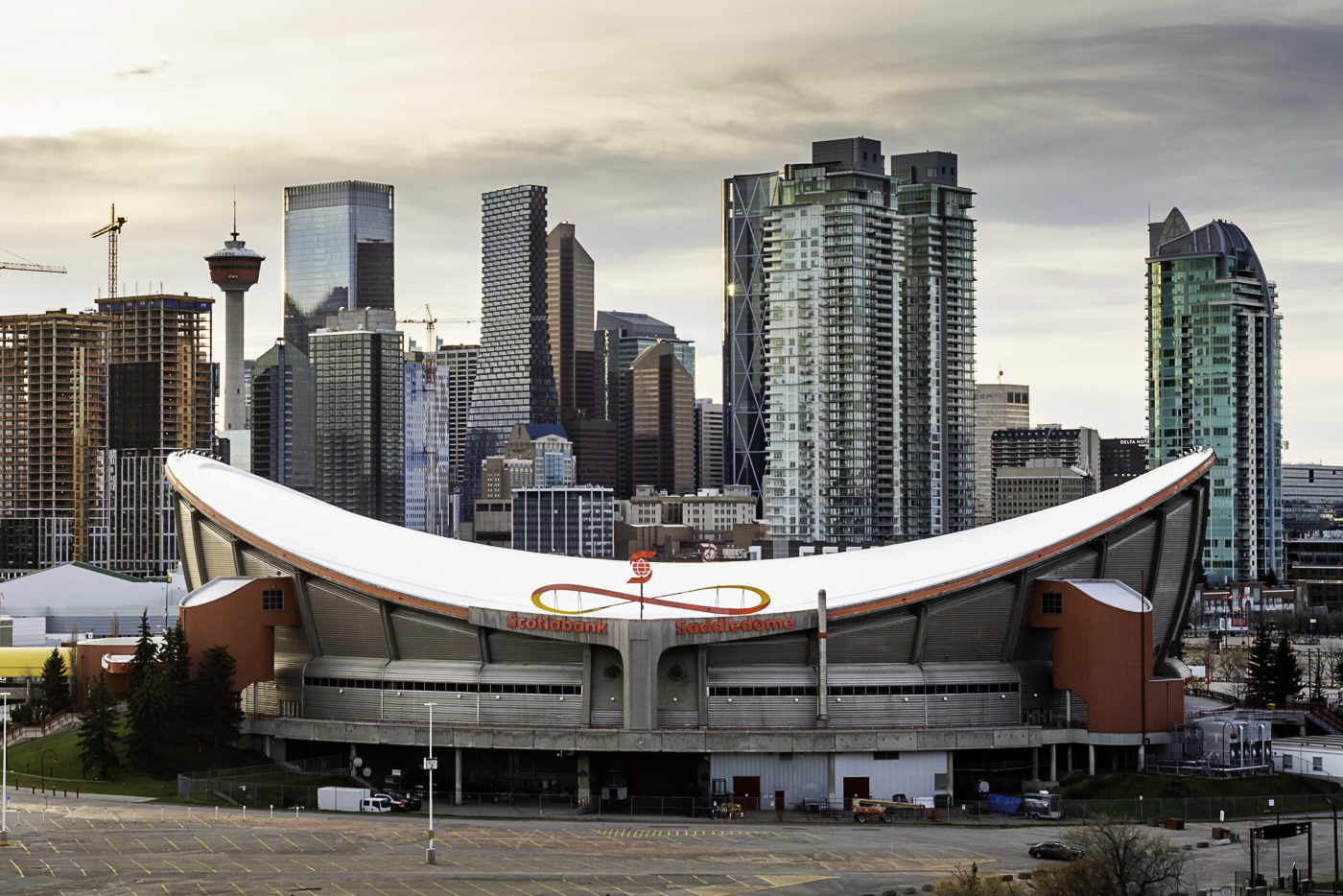
The 16th In Your House was held in Calgary, Alberta, Canada at the Canadian Airlines Saddledome (pictured in 2020 after it had since been renamed as Scotiabank Saddledome).

=== Background ===
In Your House was a series of monthly professional wrestling pay-per-view (PPV) events first produced by the American company World Wrestling Federation (WWF, renamed WWE in 2002) in May 1995. They aired when the promotion was not holding one of its then-five major PPVs (WrestleMania, King of the Ring, SummerSlam, Survivor Series, and Royal Rumble) and were sold at a lower cost. In Your House 16: Canadian Stampede was scheduled for July 6, 1997, at the Canadian Airlines Saddledome in Calgary, Alberta, Canada. The name of the show was a reference to the event being held in Canada, as well as the annual Calgary Stampede, which had just concluded the day before. This was the third In Your House in Canada, after In Your House 4 in October 1995 in Winnipeg, Manitoba and In Your House 9 in July 1996 in Vancouver, British Columbia.

=== Storylines ===
In Your House 16: Canadian Stampede consisted of professional wrestling matches involving different wrestlers from pre-existing scripted feuds, plots, and storylines that were played out on Raw Is War and other WWF television programs.

The main rivalry heading into the event involved "Stone Cold" Steve Austin and Bret Hart. While on hiatus from the WWF from April until October 1996, Hart received challenges from Austin. After he returned to the WWF, he feuded with Austin, who cost him a victory at the Royal Rumble match and the WWF Championship. After fighting with him on WrestleMania 13, Austin became a fan favorite, while Hart became a villain, criticizing the American fans for cheering Austin. Hart recruited his brother Owen, his brothers-in-law The British Bulldog and Jim "The Anvil" Neidhart and Austin's former partner Brian Pillman, creating the Hart Foundation, to fight with Austin. At King of the Ring, Hart challenged the five best American wrestlers of the WWF to fight his team at the event. Austin entered himself into the match the next day on WWF Raw is War, before his match with Brian Pillman. Before the match, the Hart Foundation attacked Austin, prompting Mankind to replace him in the match. After the match, Austin and Ken Shamrock cleared the ring of the Hart Foundation, and Austin gave the Stunner finisher on Shamrock. Next week, Austin and Pillman fought as the Hart Foundation members were handcuffed into the ring posts, but they managed to release themselves and attack Austin, who was rescued by Shamrock, Mankind, and Goldust. After a brief brawl between Austin and Shamrock, which was broken by the Legion of Doom, Goldust suggested that he, Shamrock, and LOD team up with Austin in the 5 on 5 match at the event, to which Austin agreed. On the June 23 edition of Raw Is War, LOD fought The Godwinns, and after their victory, the Hart Foundation attacked them and Shamrock. Next week, while Austin fought Neidhart, Bret Hart (Who attacked Shamrock during the match) came and attacked Austin, putting the figure-four leglock on Austin while on the ring post.

Another predominant feud involved the WWF Champion The Undertaker and Vader. On the June 23 episode of Raw Is War, Vader was announced as the number one contender for the championship, as Undertaker had to team up with Vader in a tournament match for the WWF Tag Team Championship against the Nation of Domination's team of D'Lo Brown and Faarooq. Vader's manager, Paul Bearer, forced The Undertaker to do as he said or else he would tell a secret from the Undertaker's past. After the Undertaker attacked Vader in the match, Bearer told the secret next week: Throughout The Undertaker's childhood and teen years, he lived in a funeral home with his parents and half-brother. According to Paul Bearer, The Undertaker killed his parents and caused his half-brother's face to be bruised and scarred by setting the funeral home ablaze. The Undertaker denied it and said that Kane was the one who burnt the house. During an attack from the Undertaker after Vader's match with Rockabilly, Bearer said he heard that from Kane himself, because unbeknownst to The Undertaker, Kane had survived the fire and was still alive.

Another rivalry heading into the event was the continuation of the battle between Mankind and Hunter Hearst Helmsley. At the King of the Ring event, Helmsley and Mankind fought at the finals of the King of the Ring tournament. Helmsley won, and he kept attacking Mankind after the match. The day after that, Mankind requested a rematch, to which Helmsley agreed. On the June 30 edition of Raw Is War, Mankind and Brian Pillman fought in a match, which Pillman won by a count-out after Helmsley interfered.

== Event ==
Other on-screen personnel
Role:	Name:
English commentators	Vince McMahon
English commentators	Jim Ross
English commentators	Jerry Lawler
Spanish commentators	Carlos Cabrera
Spanish commentators	Tito Santana
French commentators	Ray Rougeau
French commentators	Jean Brassard
Interviewer	Dok Hendrix
Ring announcer	Howard Finkel
Referees	Tim White
Referees	Jack Doan
Referees	Earl Hebner
Referees	Mike Chioda

In the first contest of the night, King Hunter Hearst Helmsley took on Mankind. The match ended in a double countout after a brutal brawl that saw Helmsley's bodyguard, Chyna, get involved. The two men didn't stop fighting though, taking their brawl through the crowd into the parking lot. The two men were finally broken up, with Helmsley left bloodied.

The second match saw Taka Michinoku taking on Junior Heavyweight legend The Great Sasuke. After some back-and-forth action, The Great Sasuke won the match via a Tiger Suplex followed by a pin.

The semi-main event saw The Undertaker retain his WWF Championship against NJPW legend, Vader, accompanied by Taker's former manager, Paul Bearer. The Undertaker won with a Tombstone Piledriver into a pin to retain his WWF Championship.

Before the main event, Farmer's Daughter performed "O Canada".

The main event saw Canada's Hart Foundation, consisting of Bret Hart, Brian Pillman, "The British Bulldog" Davey Boy Smith, Jim Neidhart, and Owen Hart defeat Ken Shamrock, Goldust, The Legion of Doom (Animal and Hawk), and "Stone Cold" Steve Austin. Owen won the match for the Hart Foundation via a roll up after members from the Hart Family attacked "Stone Cold". After the match, the entire Hart family got into the ring and celebrated with the Hart Foundation, making sure everyone from the other team left the ring. Austin came back soon afterward by himself, and got attacked by the Hart family as the Canadian crowd chanted, "Austin Sucks!". Austin would get handcuffed by security before being forced to the back.

== Reception ==
This pay-per-view was awarded Best Major Show for 1997 by Dave Meltzer's Wrestling Observer Newsletter. In 2013, WWE released a list of their "15 best pay-per-views ever", with In Your House 16: Canadian Stampede ranked at number ten. In 2019, Troy L. Smith of Cleveland.com released a list of the "50 greatest wrestling pay-per-views of all time" from every professional wrestling promotion in the world, with the event ranked at number seven.

== Aftermath ==
"Stone Cold" Steve Austin's feud with Bret Hart ended after the Canadian Stampede, but immediately started a feud with his brother Owen the following night by attacking him while he was singing the Canadian national anthem. This led to a title match between the two for the Intercontinental Championship at SummerSlam with Austin giving the stipulation that if he lost, he will kiss Hart's ass. During the match, Hart delivered a botched piledriver to Austin, legitimately breaking his neck and temporarily paralyzing him. Despite this, Austin was able to win the match and the title but due to the severity of his neck injury, he was forced to relinquish the Intercontinental Championship and the Tag Team Championships. Austin eventually recovered and ended his feud with Hart by defeating him for the Intercontinental Championship at Survivor Series.

Following the event, WWF changed the naming convention for In Your House events, starting with September's Ground Zero: In Your House: the In Your House name became a subtitle, instead of the title of the event. The practice of numbering In Your House events was also discontinued. This was also the final two hour In Your House event as the event expanded to three hours starting with the aforementioned Ground Zero.

== Results ==
No.	Results	Stipulations	Times
1^{F}	The Godwinns (Henry O. Godwinn and Phineas I. Godwinn) defeated The New Blackjacks (Blackjack Bradshaw and Blackjack Windham)	Tag team match	5:32
2	Hunter Hearst Helmsley (with Chyna) vs. Mankind ended in a double countout	Singles match	13:14
3	The Great Sasuke defeated Taka Michinoku	Singles match	10:00
4	The Undertaker (c) defeated Vader (with Paul Bearer)	Singles match for the WWF Championship	12:39
5	The Hart Foundation (Bret Hart, Jim Neidhart, Owen Hart, British Bulldog, and Brian Pillman) defeated "Stone Cold" Steve Austin, Ken Shamrock, Goldust, and The Legion of Doom (Hawk and Animal)	10-man tag team match	24:31
(c) / – the champion(s) heading into the match; F / – the match was broadcast prior to the pay-per-view on Free for All

== See also ==
- Professional wrestling in Canada
