= The Blackjacks =

Professional wrestling tag team

Tag team
- Members: Blackjack Mulligan; Blackjack Lanza
- Billed heights: Mulligan: 6 ft 9 in (2.06 m); Lanza: 6 ft 5 in (1.96 m)
- Combined billed weight: 585 lb (265 kg; 41.8 st)
- Billed from: Texas
- Debut: 1971
- Disbanded: 1984

The Blackjacks were a professional wrestling tag team consisting Blackjack Mulligan and Blackjack Lanza. After forming in the 1970s, they wrestled in a variety of professional wrestling promotions, including the American Wrestling Association (AWA) and World Wide Wrestling Federation (WWWF). They were inducted into the WWE Hall of Fame in 2006. Blackjack Bradshaw and Blackjack Windham briefly rebooted the idea in 1997.

== History ==
Blackjack Mulligan and Blackjack Lanza first joined forces in 1971. They were managed by Bobby Heenan.

The Blackjacks won multiple tag team titles, including the WWA Tag Team Championship and two in WCCW. Their most-known run came after the WWWF Tag Team Championship (with Lou Albano as their manager) on August 26, 1975, by defeating Dominic DeNucci and Pat Barrett.

After their tenure in the WWWF they disbanded and went their separate ways. They reunited in 1983 in St. Louis and the AWA until disbanding in 1984. Lanza retired from wrestling in 1985 and became a road agent for WWF (WWWF). Mulligan returned to the WWF, Florida and Texas until his retirement in 1989.

On April 1, 2006, The Blackjacks were inducted into the WWE Hall of Fame by Heenan.

Mulligan died on April 4, 2016, from heart failure and other disease at 74 years old.

Lanza had died on December 8, 2021. He was 86 years old, and had been in poor health.

=== The New Blackjacks ===
In February 1997, Mulligan's son, Barry Windham, and Justin "Hawk" Bradshaw formed The New Blackjacks in the WWF. They were known as Blackjack Windham and Blackjack Bradshaw, who originally competed as heels, but later as babyfaces it was rumored in early 1997 that they would be bodyguards for The Undertaker (for his WWF World Heavyweight Championship run in 1997). They competed in a four-way tag team match at WrestleMania 13, which was won by The Headbangers. They then feuded with The Godwinns. They never reached the success of their predecessors and disbanded in January 1998, as Windham turned on Bradshaw to join the invading NWA stable.

== Championships and accomplishments ==
- Big Time Wrestling
  - NWA American Tag Team Championship (2 times)
  - NWA Texas Tag Team Championship (1 Time)
- Professional Wrestling Hall of Fame
  - Class of 2016
- World Wrestling Association
  - WWA World Tag Team Championship (1 time)
- World Wide Wrestling Federation / World Wrestling Entertainment
  - WWE Hall of Fame (Class of 2006)
  - WWWF World Tag Team Championship (1 time)

== See also ==
- The Acolytes Protection Agency
- The Four Horsemen
- The Heenan Family
- The U.S. Express
- The West Texas Rednecks
