= Ahmed Johnson =

American football player and professional wrestler (born 1963)

Personal information
- Born: Anthony Norris; June 6, 1963 (age 63) Kokomo, Indiana, U.S.
- Education: University of Tennessee; Huston–Tillotson University
- Children: 5

Professional wrestling career
- Ring name(s): Ahmed Johnson; Big T Moadib; Night Breeder; Black Superman; Siva; Tony Norris; Ahmed Williams
- Billed height: 6 ft 2 in (188 cm)
- Billed weight: 305 lb (138 kg)
- Billed from: Pearl River, Mississippi
- Trained by: Skandor Akbar; Ivan Putski; Scott Casey
- Debut: 1989
- Retired: 2003

Anthony Norris (born June 6, 1963) is an American retired professional wrestler. He is best known for his appearances with the professional wrestling promotion World Wrestling Federation (WWF) from 1995 to 1998, under the ring name Ahmed Johnson.

Norris was one of the most prominent stars of the WWF in the mid-1990s, becoming the first ever African-American WWF Intercontinental Champion and headlining the In Your House 9: International Incident pay-per-view in July 1996. After his departure from WWF, he joined rival organisation World Championship Wrestling in 2000.

== Early life ==
Norris was born in Kokomo, Indiana, on June 6, 1963, growing up in Auburndale, Florida, before moving to Texas. He endured a harsh childhood, where his father abused his mother regularly and abused him as well if he intervened, he states.

While attending high school, he performed well at American football, basketball, amateur wrestling, and track and field. According to Norris, he joined the United States Army but was later discharged due to striking his captain over viewing his orders as "kind of cowardly."

== Professional wrestling career ==
=== Early career (1989–1995) ===
Norris trained as a professional wrestler under Skandor Akbar, Scott Casey, and Ivan Putski. After making his debut in 1989, he competed on the independent circuit for the next few years before debuting in the Global Wrestling Federation (GWF) in 1993 as Moadib. In 1995 he worked for NWA Dallas as "the Regulator" Tony Norris, feuding with John Hawk for the NWA North American Heavyweight Championship. He also toured Japan that year with the newly founded Big Japan Pro Wrestling promotion.

=== World Wrestling Federation (1995–1998) ===
==== Debut (1995–1996) ====
Norris made his first appearance in the World Wrestling Federation (WWF) on July 15, 1995, wrestling on a house show in Houston, Texas. Competing as Tony Norris, he defeated Rico Suave.

After being signed to a contract by the WWF, he made his first appearance under the ring name "Ahmed Johnson" at In Your House 3 on September 24, 1995, in Saginaw, Michigan, defeating Skip in a dark match. Prior to his first televised match, he appeared at the end of a Raw taping by entering a post-match brawl and slamming Yokozuna. His televised debut came on the October 23, 1995, episode of Raw. He made his pay-per-view debut at Survivor Series in November 1995, as the team of Razor Ramon, Yokozuna, Owen Hart, and Dean Douglas took on the team of Johnson, Shawn Michaels, Sid, and British Bulldog. In the end, Johnson, Michaels, and Bulldog won the match as the survivors of their team, with Johnson eliminating both Owen Hart and Yokozuna by pinfall.

At In Your House 5 in December 1995, Johnson defeated Buddy Landel (substituting for Dean Douglas) in 42 seconds. After the match, Johnson was interviewed by Jerry Lawler, at which time Lawler distracted him in order for Jeff Jarrett to attack him, starting a feud between the two in the process. At the Royal Rumble in January 1996, Johnson defeated Jarrett by disqualification after Jarrett struck him with a guitar (causing Johnson to be hospitalized for a concussion). At WrestleMania XII, the team of Johnson, Yokozuna, and Jake "The Snake" Roberts faced Camp Cornette; Camp Cornette won when Vader pinned Roberts with the Vader Bomb. At In Your House 7: Good Friends, Better Enemies in April 1996, Roberts and Johnson teamed up to take on Hart and British Bulldog. While Jim Cornette had the referee distracted, British Bulldog hit him in the knee with Cornette's tennis racket; he then forced Roberts to submit with a single leg Boston crab. After the match, Roberts and Johnson attempted to put Roberts' python, "Revelations", on Cornette, but Hart pulled Cornette out of the ring.

In May 1996, Johnson won the inaugural Kuwait Cup tournament in Kuwait City, defeating Hunter Hearst Helmsley in the finals.

==== Intercontinental Champion (1996) ====
At King of the Ring in June 1996, Johnson defeated Goldust to win the WWF Intercontinental Championship. As the first African American Intercontinental Champion, most assumed it was only a matter of time before he climbed to main event status. He was soon paired on-screen with Shawn Michaels in several tag team matches and often helped Michaels against Jim Cornette and his men, known as Camp Cornette. At In Your House 9: International Incident, Johnson, along with Michaels and Sycho Sid, lost to Vader, Owen Hart, and the British Bulldog. On the July 22 edition of Raw, Michaels and Johnson teamed again and challenged the Smoking Gunns for the WWF Tag Team Championship. During the match, Faarooq Asad debuted and attacked Johnson, causing the match to end in a disqualification. This was supposed to lead to a match at SummerSlam for the Intercontinental Championship.

On the August 5, 1996 episode of Raw, Johnson won an 11-man battle royal, last eliminating the man whom he beat for the Intercontinental Championship, Goldust, to be the number one contender for the WWF Championship for the day after SummerSlam. However, Johnson was diagnosed with legitimate kidney problems, and was forced to miss both SummerSlam and his scheduled WWF Championship match the following night. As a result, he was out for four months and, in order to keep the angle going, the attack by Faarooq was said to be the cause of the kidney damage. The news was made public on WWF programming by incorporating it into the 11-man battle royal which Johnson won. Voice-over commentary was added so that Johnson's participation in the battle royal was said to be against doctors' orders, when in reality his kidney problem had yet to be discovered at the time of taping. The injury further forced him to vacate the Intercontinental Championship, which was subsequently won in a tournament by Marc Mero.

==== Feud with the Nation of Domination (1996–1998) ====
Johnson returned from injury in December 1996 at In Your House 12: It's Time, resulting in a confrontation with Faarooq and his stable, the Nation of Domination. The following month at the Royal Rumble, Johnson faced Faarooq, winning by disqualification after the Nation of Domination members interfered. Two days later, Johnson and The Undertaker defeated Faarooq and Nation member Crush in a No Holds Barred match at the Triple Threat event. He began teaming with the Legion of Doom and the three fought the Nation of Domination at WrestleMania 13 in a Chicago Street Fight. At A Cold Day in Hell, he faced the Nation of Domination in a gauntlet match, defeating Crush and Savio Vega before losing to Faarooq.

In June 1997, Johnson turned on WWF Champion The Undertaker and joined the Nation of Domination alongside Faarooq, D'Lo Brown, and Kama Mustafa. Johnson was scheduled to face The Undertaker for the WWF Championship at In Your House 16: Canadian Stampede the following month, but suffered another injury (he was replaced by Vader).

Johnson returned from injury once more in August 1997, upon which the Nation of Domination turned on him and replaced him with Rocky Maivia, which resulted in Johnson turning face once more. He restarted his feud with the Nation, and would reunite with the Legion of Doom as well as join forces with Ken Shamrock during the feud. At Survivor Series 1997, they defeated the Nation of Domination in a Survivor Series match. Johnson's last appearance was at the pay-per-view No Way Out of Texas: In Your House in February 1998, teaming with Shamrock and the Disciples of Apocalypse to defeat the Nation of Domination.

==== Departure (1998) ====
In February 1998, while still in Texas, Johnson was booked to appear in a segment with The Truth Commission where he was to be beaten and dragged up the entrance ramp. Unbeknownst to WWF management, Johnson's sister – an avid fan of the WWF – was battling cancer. Johnson knew his sister watched the WWF each week and didn't want her to have the image of her brother being beaten and dragged by the neck while she was gravely ill. According to Johnson, 15 minutes before he was scheduled for the match which would end in his being attacked, he received a call that his sister was "doing really bad" and that he should come immediately to her hospital in Florida. Johnson then met with Vince McMahon and told him he "had some things to deal with" and immediately left WWF and flew to Florida, where his sister died the following week. Johnson has stated subsequently that he did not tell WWF management the reason for his departure at the time because he "didn't like to burden people with his problems" and didn't want to give the impression that he was "telling them something for sympathy". In a July 2021 interview, Johnson for the first time also made claims that racism was another reason for his departure, saying, "There was a family issue that needed my attention, but, on top of that, there were other things going on behind scenes that didn't sit right with me. I started noticing a lot of racism going on. It called me not wanting to be there, and back off".

=== World Championship Wrestling (2000) ===
After being inactive for close to two years, Norris signed a contract with World Championship Wrestling (WCW) and debuted at Souled Out in January 2000 as a heel. He gained a massive amount of weight at this time, and was aptly named Big T. He interfered in a match between Harlem Heat tag team partners and real-life brothers, Booker T and Stevie Ray. He attacked Booker, causing Stevie Ray to be disqualified. Big T and Stevie Ray formed the tag team Harlem Heat 2000. At SuperBrawl, he defeated Booker to earn the rights to the Harlem Heat name and the letter T. At Uncensored, he and Stevie lost to Booker and Billy Kidman. At Spring Stampede, they participated in a five-team tag team tournament for the vacant World Tag Team Championship, where they lost to the eventual winners Shane Douglas and Buff Bagwell in the semi-finals of the tournament. He was released by WCW shortly afterwards due to ongoing weight issues.

=== Independent circuit and retirement (2002–2003) ===
Norris stayed away from wrestling after his release from WCW until he wrestled his return match for Arlington, Texas, based Professional Championship Wrestling in 2002 against Jared Steele. He wrestled in 2003 in a tag team match for Maximum Pro Wrestling, teaming with Monty Brown in a losing effort against Sabu and Gangrel. He wrestled his final match on November 8, 2003 defeating Action Jackson.

== Personal life ==
Norris grew up in Florida before taking up residence in Houston, Texas, with his daughter Nina. After retiring, he returned to college and earned a degree in criminology from Huston–Tillotson University.

In July 2016, Norris was named part of a class action lawsuit filed against WWE which alleged that wrestlers incurred traumatic brain injuries during their tenure and that the company concealed the risks of injury. The suit was litigated by attorney Konstantine Kyros, who has been involved in a number of other lawsuits against WWE. US District Judge Vanessa Lynne Bryant dismissed the lawsuit in September 2018.

== Media ==
Ahmed Johnson is a playable character in the video games WWF In Your House and WWF War Zone.

=== Filmography ===
- Witness to the Execution (1994) as Reggie Foster
- Too Legit: The MC Hammer Story (2001) as Marion "Suge" Knight

=== Television appearances ===
- Walker, Texas Ranger (1993) in episode "Unfinished Business" as Bruno

== Championships and accomplishments ==
- Pro Wrestling Illustrated
  - PWI ranked him No. 5 of the top 500 singles wrestlers in the PWI 500 in 1996
  - PWI ranked him No. 380 of the 500 best singles wrestlers of the PWI Years in 2003
  - PWI Most Improved Wrestler of the Year (1996)
- Texas All-Pro Wrestling
  - TAP Heavyweight Championship (1 time)
- United States Wrestling Association
  - USWA Unified World Heavyweight Championship (1 time)
- World Wrestling Federation
  - WWF Intercontinental Championship (1 time)
  - Kuwait Cup (1996)
  - Slammy Award (1 time)
    - New Sensation of the Squared Circle (1996)
- Wrestling Observer Newsletter
  - Worst on Interviews (1996, 1997)
